= Kaidon Salter =

American gridiron football player (born 2003)

- Salter with the BC Lions in 2026

No. 19 – BC Lions
- Position: Quarterback
- Roster status: Active
- CFL status: American

Personal information
- Born: April 4, 2003 (age 23); Dallas, Texas, U.S
- Listed height: 6 ft 1 in (1.85 m)
- Listed weight: 200 lb (91 kg)

Career information
- High school: Cedar Hill (Cedar Hill, Texas)
- College: Tennessee (2021); Liberty (2021–2024); Colorado (2025)
- NFL draft: 2026: undrafted

Career history
- BC Lions (2026–present)

Awards and highlights
- CUSA Most Valuable Player (2023); CUSA Championship Game MVP (2023); First-team All-CUSA (2023)

Career CFL statistics as of 2026
- Comp. / Att.: 34 / 65
- Completion percentage: 52.3%
- TD-INT: 2–2
- Passer rating: 75.6
- Rushing yards: 219
- Rushing average: 10.4
- Receptions: 1
- Receiving yards: 3
- Stats at CFL.ca
- Stats at Pro Football Reference

Kaidon Salter (born April 4, 2003) is an American professional gridiron football quarterback for the BC Lions of the Canadian Football League (CFL). He played college football for the Liberty Flames, Tennessee Volunteers, and Colorado Buffaloes.

== Early life ==
Salter attended Cedar Hill High School in Cedar Hill, Texas, where he completed 383 of 659 passes for 5,564 yards and 52 touchdowns to 16 interceptions and rushed for 1,621 yards and 26 touchdowns, while also hauling in one reception for a touchdown. He committed to play college football at the University of Tennessee over offers from schools such as Auburn and Baylor.

== College career ==
=== Tennessee ===
After Salter was arrested on charges of simple possession and driving without a license, he was dismissed from the Tennessee football program.

=== Liberty ===
Salter transferred to Liberty. He made his collegiate debut in week 9 of the 2021 season, where he completed his first touchdown pass in a win over UMass. Salter finished the 2021 season going one for two on his passes for 39 yards and a touchdown and rushing for 53 yards. In week 2 of the 2022 season, he made his first career start, where he completed 13 of 25 passes for 202 yards and rushed for 79 yards and a touchdown in a 21–14 win over UAB. In the 2022 Boca Raton Bowl, Salter went 12 for 20 passing for 84 yards and a touchdown, and rushed for 63 yards, in a 21–19 loss to Toledo. He finished the 2022 season completing 87 of 149 passing attempts for 1,088 yards and eight touchdowns to five interceptions. Salter added 285 yards and two touchdowns on the ground.

==== 2023 season ====
In the 2023 season opener, Salter completed 11 of 20 passes for 143 yards and two touchdowns and rushed for 82 yards in a 34–24 win over Bowling Green. In week 2, he completed 15 of 25 attempts for 276 yards and two touchdowns and rushed for two touchdowns in a win over New Mexico State. In week 3, Salter completed 16 of 26 passes for 344 yards and five touchdowns and rushed for 66 yards and a touchdown in a 55–27 win over Buffalo, earning Conference USA offensive player of the week honors. In week 4, he completed 11 of 21 passes for 156 yards and two touchdowns with one interception and ran for 77 yards and two touchdowns in a 38–6 win over FIU. In week 6 against Sam Houston, Salter scored two touchdowns, one through the air and one on the ground in a win. The next week, Salter threw for 177 yards and two touchdowns in a 31–13 win over Jacksonville State. In week 8, he threw for 140 yards and two touchdowns and ran for 160 yards in a 42–35 win over Middle Tennessee. In week 9, Salter threw for 169 yards and three touchdowns to go along with 117 rushing yards and a touchdown in a 42–29 win over the CUSA preseason favorites, Western Kentucky. The next week against Louisiana Tech, he threw for 297 yards and four touchdowns in another win. The next week, Salter scored five touchdowns against Old Dominion in a 38–10 win. The following week against UMass, he threw for 225 yards and two touchdowns and ran for 118 yards and two more touchdowns in a 49–25 win. In Liberty's final regular season game, Salter completed four of 11 passes for 22 yards and ran for 76 yards in a 42–28 win over UTEP to complete Liberty's first undefeated regular season. In the CUSA Championship game in a rematch against New Mexico State, he threw for 319 yards and two touchdowns and ran for 165 yards and a touchdown in the 49–35 win which gave Liberty their first CUSA Championship in Liberty's first season in the conference. Salter was awarded the Conference USA Championship Game MVP award. After Liberty earned the G5 New Year's Six bid, Salter threw for 126 yards, 1 touchdown and an interception in a loss against No. 8 Oregon in the 2024 Fiesta Bowl. He announced on January 2, 2024, that he was entering the transfer portal. Three days later, on January 5, 2024, Salter decided to exit the transfer portal and remain with Liberty. He also set single-season program records for passing touchdowns (32), total yards (3,965), and total touchdowns responsible for (44).

==== 2024 season ====
Salter and the Flames began the 2024 season by winning their first five games. During the stretch, Salter delivered a standout performance against East Carolina in Week 4, completing 19 of 32 passes for 223 yards, four touchdowns, and one interception in a 35–24 victory. Heading into a Week 6 matchup, Liberty held the longest active regular-season winning streak in the FBS at 17 games before falling to Kennesaw State, which entered the game winless and earned its first FBS victory. The Flames finished the regular season with an 8–3 record, while their early-season matchup against Appalachian State was canceled. On December 2, 2024, Salter entered the NCAA transfer portal and missed the 2025 Bahamas Bowl against Buffalo. During the season, Salter completed 147 of 261 passes for 1,886 yards, 15 touchdowns, and six interceptions while adding 579 rushing yards and seven rushing touchdowns. He finished his Liberty career with 56 passing touchdowns, ranking fourth in program history, and 7,895 passing yards, ranking fifth. His 77 total touchdowns responsible for were tied for second in program history.

=== Colorado ===
On December 18, 2024, Salter transferred to the Colorado Buffaloes. On August 26, 2025, Salter was named as the team's starting quarterback, beating out true freshman Julian Lewis. Salter made his Buffaloes debut in the season opener against Georgia Tech, completing 17 of 28 passes for 159 yards and a touchdown while rushing for 43 yards and a touchdown in a 27–20 loss. He was benched in favor of Ryan Staub the following week against Delaware after a slow start in the first half. Following a loss to Houston in which Salter did not play, he returned as the starter in Week 4 against Wyoming. Against the Cowboys, Salter threw for a season-high 304 yards and three touchdowns on 18 of 28 passing while adding a season-high 86 rushing yards on 11 carries and a touchdown in a 37–20 victory. He started the next six games before being benched in favor of Lewis following a Week 9 loss to Arizona. He later returned as the starter for the regular season finale against Kansas State over Lewis in order to preserve Lewis' redshirt. Colorado finished the season with a 3–9 record, with Salter posting a 3–6 record as the team's starting quarterback. He finished the season completing 127 of 204 passes for 1,414 yards, 10 touchdowns, and seven interceptions while adding 356 rushing yards and five rushing touchdowns.

== Professional career ==
Pre-draft measurables
Height	Weight	Arm length	Hand span	Wingspan	40-yard dash	10-yard split	20-yard split	20-yard shuttle	Three-cone drill	Vertical jump	Broad jump
6 ft 0 7/8 in (1.85 m)	195 lb (88 kg)	30 in (0.76 m)	8 5/8 in (0.22 m)	6 ft 3 5/8 in (1.92 m)	4.65 s	1.65 s	2.73 s	4.26 s	7.23 s	35.5 in (0.90 m)	10 ft 6 in (3.20 m)
All values from Pro Day

In April 2026, Salter received an invitation to participate in the Tennessee Titans' rookie minicamp after going undrafted in the 2026 NFL draft. On May 4, 2026, Salter signed with the BC Lions of the Canadian Football League (CFL). During the preseason, Salter won the third-string quarterback position over Jarret Doege, completing 18 of 26 passes for 190 yards and a touchdown. He began the season as the third-string quarterback behind starter Nathan Rourke and Chase Brice. After Rourke suffered an injury in Week 7 against the Edmonton Elks, Salter was elevated to Brice's primary backup the following week against the Toronto Argonauts. Due to Brice's struggles, Salter made his CFL debut in the loss, completing nine of 15 passes for 121 yards. He was named the Lions' starting quarterback heading into their Week 9 matchup against the Winnipeg Blue Bombers. In the matchup against Winnipeg, Salter completed seven of 15 passes for 96 yards and a touchdown while adding 160 rushing yards on 10 carries in the 35–19 victory. Salter combined with running back Zander Horvath for 351 rushing yards.

== Career statistics ==
=== CFL ===
Year	Team	Games			Passing								Rushing			
Year	Team	GD	GS	Record	Cmp	Att	Pct	Yds	Y/A	TD	Int	Rtg	Att	Yds	Y/A	TD
2026	BC	18	2	1–1	34	65	52.3	507	7.8	2	2	75.6	21	219	10.4	0
Career		18	2	1–1	34	65	52.3	507	7.8	2	2	75.6	21	219	10.4	0

=== College ===
Year	Team	Games			Passing								Rushing			
Year	Team	GP	GS	Record	Cmp	Att	Pct	Yds	Y/A	TD	Int	Rtg	Att	Yds	Avg	TD
2021	Liberty	2	0	—	1	2	50.0	39	19.5	1	0	378.8	5	53	10.6	0
2022	Liberty	8	4	2–2	87	149	58.4	1,088	7.3	8	5	130.7	69	285	4.1	2
2023	Liberty	14	14	13–1	177	290	61.0	2,876	9.9	32	6	176.6	163	1,089	6.7	12
2024	Liberty	11	11	8–3	147	261	56.3	1,886	7.2	15	6	131.4	114	587	5.1	7
2025	Colorado	9	9	3–6	127	204	62.3	1,414	6.9	10	7	129.8	103	356	3.5	5
Career		44	38	26–12	539	906	59.5	7,303	8.1	66	24	145.9	454	2,362	5.2	26
