= 2024 Fiesta Bowl =

2024 Fiesta Bowl may refer to:

- 2024 Fiesta Bowl (January), contested following the 2023 season, between Liberty and Oregon on January 1, 2024
- 2024 Fiesta Bowl (December), contested following the 2024 season, between Boise State and Penn State on December 31, 2024
