= 2023 Sam Houston Bearkats football team =

American college football season

2023 Sam Houston Bearkats football
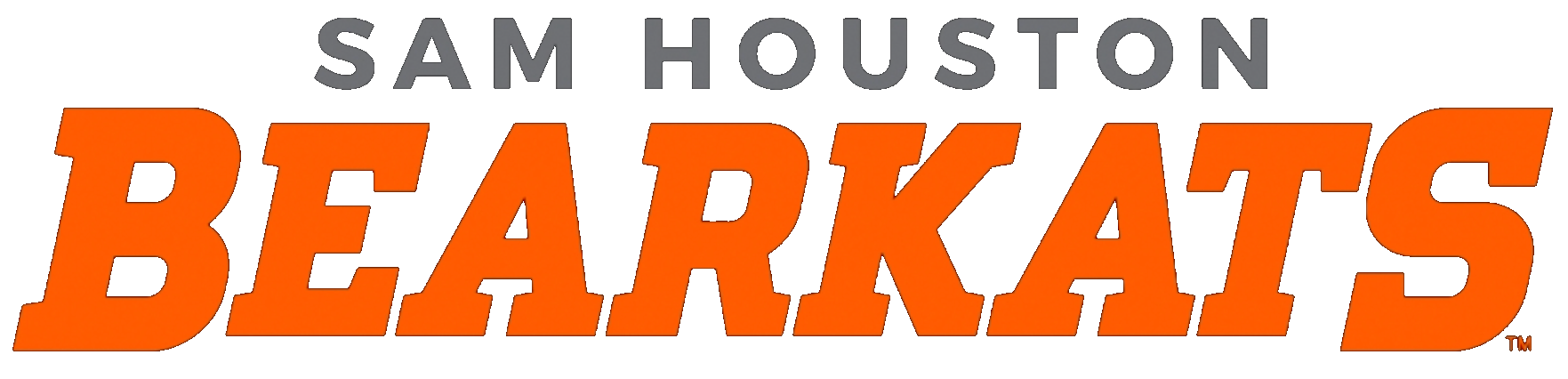
- Conference: Conference USA
- Record: 3–9 (2–6 C–USA)
- Head coach: K. C. Keeler (10th season)
- Offensive coordinator: Brad Cornelsen (1st season)
- Offensive scheme: Spread
- Co-defensive coordinators: Clayton Carlin (7th season); Joe Morris (3rd season)
- Base defense: 4–2–5
- Home stadium: Bowers Stadium

2023 Conference USA football standings
	Conf.			Overall
Team	W		L	W		L
No. 25 Liberty y$	8	–	0	13	–	1
New Mexico State y	7	–	1	10	–	5
Jacksonville State*	6	–	2	9	–	4
Western Kentucky	5	–	3	8	–	5
Middle Tennessee	3	–	5	4	–	8
UTEP	2	–	6	3	–	9
Sam Houston*	2	–	6	3	–	9
Louisiana Tech	2	–	6	3	–	9
FIU	1	–	7	4	–	8
Championship: Liberty 49, New Mexico State 35
$ – Conference champion; y – Championship game participant; * – Ineligible for postseason play due to FCS-to-FBS transition rules; Rankings from AP Poll

The 2023 Sam Houston Bearkats football team represented Sam Houston State University in Conference USA during the 2023 NCAA Division I FBS football season. The Bearkats were led by tenth-year head coach K. C. Keeler. They played their home games at Bowers Stadium in Huntsville, Texas. They were ineligible for a bowl game, the conference championship, or the College Football Playoff due to rules governing transitions from FCS to FBS. The Sam Houston Bearkats football team drew an average home attendance of 8,298 in 2023.

== Offseason ==
=== Transfers ===
==== Outgoing ====
Player	Position	Destination
Kam Alexander	CB	UTSA
Erick Conley	DL	None

==== Incoming ====
Player	Position	Previous Team
Bobby Duncum	DL	SMU
Grant Gunnell	QB	North Texas
Rhett Larson	OT	SMU
Jaden Phillips	EDGE	New Mexico
Xavier Ward	QB	Washington State
John Gentry	RB	Utah State
Akeem Smith	DL	Georgia State

== Preseason ==
=== Conference USA media poll ===
Conference USA media poll
Predicted finish	Team	Votes (1st place)
1	Western Kentucky	(18)
2	Liberty	(4)
3	Middle Tennessee	
4	Louisiana Tech	
5	New Mexico State	
6	UTEP	
7	Jacksonville State	
T8	FIU	
T8	Sam Houston	

== Schedule ==
Sam Houston and Conference USA announced the 2023 football schedule on January 10, 2023.

Date	Time	Opponent	Site	TV	Result	Attendance
September 2	9:15 p.m.	at BYU*	LaVell Edwards Stadium; Provo, UT	FS1	L 0–14	59,006
September 9	7:00 p.m.	vs. Air Force*	NRG Stadium; Houston, TX	CBSSN	L 3–13	25,121
September 23	6:00 p.m.	at Houston*	TDECU Stadium; Houston, TX	ESPN+	L 7–38	35,044
September 28	7:00 p.m.	Jacksonville State	Bowers Stadium; Huntsville, TX	ESPNU	L 28–35 ^{OT}	14,566
October 5	6:00 p.m.	at Liberty	Williams Stadium; Lynchburg, VA	CBSSN	L 16–21	17,100
October 11	8:00 p.m.	at New Mexico State	Aggie Memorial Stadium; Las Cruces, NM	CBSSN	L 13–27	12,812
October 18	6:00 p.m.	FIU	Bowers Stadium; Huntsville, TX	CBSSN	L 27–33 ^{2OT}	7,543
October 25	7:00 p.m.	UTEP	Bowers Stadium; Huntsville, TX	ESPN2	L 34–37	6,889
November 4	12:00 p.m.	Kennesaw State*^{†}	Bowers Stadium; Huntsville, TX	ESPN+	W 24–21	7,143
November 11	2:00 p.m.	at Louisiana Tech	Joe Aillet Stadium; Ruston, LA	ESPN+	W 42–27	15,080
November 18	2:30 p.m.	at Western Kentucky	Houchens Industries–L. T. Smith Stadium; Bowling Green, KY	ESPN+	L 23–28	11,041
November 25	11:00 a.m.	Middle Tennessee	Bowers Stadium; Huntsville, TX	ESPN+	W 23–20	5,349
*Non-conference game; ^{†}Homecoming; All times are in Central time

== Game summaries ==
=== at BYU ===
Sam Houston Bearkats (0–0) at BYU Cougars (0–0) – Game summary

Quarter	1	2	3	4	Total
Bearkats	0	0	0	0	0
Cougars	7	0	0	7	14

at LaVell Edwards Stadium • Provo, Utah

- Date: September 2
- Game time: 9:15 p.m. CDT/8:15 p.m. MDT
- Game weather: Sunny, 74 °F (23 °C)
- Game attendance: 59,006
- Referee: Dan Scanlan
- TV announcers (FS1): Alex Faust (play-by-play) and Petros Papadakis (analyst)

Game information

First quarter

- (10:39) BYU – Kedon Slovis 5-yard run, Will Ferrin kick (BYU 7–0; Drive: 8 plays, 50 yards, 2:54)

Second quarter

- No scoring plays

Third quarter

- No scoring plays

Fourth quarter

- (14:49) BYU – Kedon Slovis 1-yard run, Will Ferrin kick (BYU 14–0; Drive: 11 plays, 55 yards, 4:56)

Statistics	SHSU	BYU
First downs	11	12
Plays–yards	57–185	67–257
Rushes–yards	23–38	33–112
Passing yards	147	145
Passing: comp–att–int	18–33–3	20–33–0
Time of possession	28:27	31:33

Team	Category	Player	Statistics
Sam Houston	Passing	Keegan Shoemaker	18/33, 147 yards, 3 INT
Sam Houston	Rushing	John Gentry	8 rushes, 19 yards
Sam Houston	Receiving	Noah Smith	3 receptions, 44 yards
BYU	Passing	Kedon Slovis	20/33, 145 yards
BYU	Rushing	LJ Martin	16 rushes, 91 yards
BYU	Receiving	Darius Lassiter	4 receptions, 43 yards

=== vs. Air Force ===
Air Force Falcons (1–0) vs. Sam Houston State Bearkats (0–1) – Game summary

Quarter	1	2	3	4	Total
Falcons	0	3	0	10	13
Bearkats	0	0	3	0	3

at NRG Stadium • Houston, Texas

- Date: September 9
- Game time: 7:00 p.m. CDT
- Game weather: None (retractable roof closed)
- Game attendance: 25,121
- TV announcers (CBSSN): Carter Blackburn (play-by-play) and Robert Turbin (analyst)

Game information
First quarter
- No scoring plays

Second quarter

- (8:36) AFA – Matthew Dapore 42-yard field goal (Drive: 9 plays, 47 yards, 5:03; Air Force 3–0)

Third quarter

- (6:03) SHSU – Colby Sessums 45-yard field goal (Drive: 13 plays, 33 yards, 6:49; Tied 3–3)

Fourth quarter

- (13:41) AFA – Matthew Dapore 42-yard field goal (Drive: 13 plays, 45 yards, 7:15; Air Force 6–3)
- (5:14) AFA – Owen Burk 5-yard run, Matthew Dapore kick (Drive: 11 plays, 60 yards, 6:20; Air Force 13–3)

Statistics	AFA	SHSU
First downs	18	6
Total yards	258	80
Rushing yards	244	36
Passing yards	14	44
Turnovers	1	0
Time of possession	36:38	23:22

Team	Category	Player	Statistics
Air Force	Passing	Zac Larrier	1/3, 14 yards
Air Force	Rushing	Owen Burk	18 rushes, 75 yards, TD
Air Force	Receiving	John Lee Eldridge III	1 reception, 14 yards
Sam Houston State	Passing	Keegan Shoemaker	8/14, 44 yards
Sam Houston State	Rushing	Zach Hrbacek	10 rushes, 29 yards
Sam Houston State	Receiving	Ife Adeyi	3 receptions, 20 yards

=== At Houston ===
Sam Houston State Bearkats at Houston Cougars – Game summary

Quarter	1	2	3	4	Total
Bearkats	7	0	0	0	7
Cougars	10	14	7	7	38

at TDECU Stadium, Houston, Texas

- Date: September 23
- Game time: 6:00 p.m. CDT
- Game weather: Sunny, 94 °F (34 °C)
- Game attendance: 35,044
- Referee: Tutashinda Salaam
- TV announcers (ESPN+): Mark Neely, Ryan Leaf, and Shane Sparks
- Box score, Recap

Game information
First quarter
- HOU – Jack Martin 23-yard field goal, 9:05. Cougars 3–0. Drive: 13 plays, 69 yards, 5:55.
- SHSU – Trapper Pannell 2-yard run (Colby Sessums kick), 6:02. Bearkats 7–3. Drive: 7 plays, 83 yards, 2:58.
- HOU – Parker Jenkins 4-yard run (Jack Martin kick), 1:47. Cougars 10–7. Drive: 9 plays, 72 yards, 4:08.

Second quarter

- HOU – Parker Jenkins 1-yard run (Jack Martin kick), 7:22. Cougars 17–7. Drive: 9 plays, 78 yards, 4:13.
- HOU – Parker Jenkins 2-yard run (Jack Martin kick), 0:49. Cougars 24–7. Drive: 8 plays, 56 yards, 1:17.

Third quarter

- HOU – Matthew Golden 6-yard pass from Donovan Smith (Jack Martin kick), 2:59. Cougars 31–7. Drive: 15 plays, 86 yards, 8:42.

Fourth quarter

- HOU – Stacy Sneed 58-yard pass from Ui Ale (Jack Martin kick), 10:06. Cougars 38–7. Drive: 1 play, 58 yards, 0:10.

Statistics	SHSU	HOU
First downs	8	27
Total yards	178	538
Rushing yards	52	186
Passing yards	126	352
Turnovers	2	0
Time of possession	25:05	34:55

Team	Category	Player	Statistics
Sam Houston State	Passing	Grant Gunnell	14/22, 100 yards, INT
Sam Houston State	Rushing	Tobias Weaver	6 rushes, 18 yards
Sam Houston State	Receiving	John Gentry	5 receptions, 32 yards
Houston	Passing	Donovan Smith	31/40, 294 yards, TD
Houston	Rushing	Parker Jenkins	20 rushes, 105 yards, 3 TD
Houston	Receiving	Matthew Golden	9 receptions, 92 yards, TD

=== Jacksonville State ===
Jacksonville State Gamecocks at Sam Houston State Bearkats – Game summary

Quarter	1	2	3	4	OT	Total
Gamecocks	7	0	7	14	7	35
Bearkats	14	7	0	7	0	28

at Bowers Stadium, Huntsville, Texas

- Date: September 28
- Game time: 7:00 p.m. CDT
- Game weather: Sunny, 90 °F (32 °C)
- Game attendance: 14,566
- Referee: John Lehring
- TV announcers (ESPNU): Drew Carter and Dustin Fox
- Box score, Recap

Game information
First quarter
- JVST – Malik Jackson 26-yard run (Alen Karajic kick), 9:47. Gamecocks 7–0. Drive: 4 plays, 86 yards, 0:51.
- SHSU – John Gentry 56-yard pass from Keegan Shoemaker (Colby Sessums kick), 8:10. Tied 7–7. Drive: 4 plays, 75 yards, 1:37.
- SHSU – Noah Smith 22-yard pass from Keegan Shoemaker (Colby Sessums kick), 1:37. Bearkats 14–7. Drive: 3 plays, 38 yards, 1:02.

Second quarter

- SHSU – Trapper Pannell 3-yard run (Colby Sessums kick), 10:20. Bearkats 21–7. Drive: 11 plays, 89 yards, 5:02.

Third quarter

- JVST – Michael Pettway 31-yard pass from Logan Smothers (Alen Karajic kick), 8:32. Bearkats 21–14. Drive: 5 plays, 60 yards, 1:46.

Fourth quarter

- JVST – Logan Smothers 16-yard run (kick failed), 8:44. Bearkats 21–20. Drive: 3 plays, 31 yards, 0:57.
- SHSU – Trapper Pannell 1-yard run (Colby Sessums kick), 1:11. Bearkats 28–20. Drive: 7 plays, 20 yards, 0:46.
- JVST – Perry Carter 28-yard pass from Logan Smothers (Logan Smothers pass to Quinton Lane), 0:13. Tied 28–28. Drive: 8 plays, 75 yards, 0:58.

Overtime

- JVST – Sean Brown 24-yard pass from Logan Smothers (Colby Sessums kick). Gamecocks 35–28. Drive: 2 plays, 25 yards.

Statistics	JVST	SHSU
First downs	20	25
Total yards	393	435
Rushing yards	196	136
Passing yards	197	299
Turnovers	3	1
Time of possession	17:36	42:24

Team	Category	Player	Statistics
Jacksonville State	Passing	Logan Smothers	16/28, 197 yards, 3 TD
Jacksonville State	Rushing	Malik Jackson	13 rushes, 129 yards, TD
Jacksonville State	Receiving	Michael Pettway	3 receptions, 74 yards, TD
Sam Houston State	Passing	Keegan Shoemaker	22/38, 285 yards, 2 TD, INT
Sam Houston State	Rushing	John Gentry	30 rushes, 97 yards
Sam Houston State	Receiving	Noah Smith	10 receptions, 97 yards, TD

=== At Liberty ===
Sam Houston State Bearkats at Liberty Flames – Game summary

Quarter	1	2	3	4	Total
Bearkats	10	0	6	0	16
Flames	7	14	0	0	21

at Williams Stadium, Lynchburg, Virginia

- Date: October 5
- Game time: 6:00 p.m. CDT/7:00 p.m. EDT
- Game weather: Cloudy, 68 °F (20 °C)
- Game attendance: 17,100
- Referee: Rory Brenard
- TV announcers (CBSSN): Chick Hernandez and Robert Turbin
- Box score, Recap

Game information
First quarter
- LIB - Kaidon Salter 10-yard run (Nick Brown kick), 12:52. Flames 7–0. Drive: 5 plays, 74 yards, 2:02.
- SHSU - Al'Vonte Woodard 7-yard pass from Keegan Shoemaker (Colby Sessums kick), 6:46. Tied 7-7. Drive: 12 plays, 85 yards, 6:00.
- SHSU - Colby Sessums 33-yard field goal, 4:27. Bearkats 10-7. Drive: 4 plays, 4 yards, 1:32.

Second quarter

- LIB - Quinton Cooley 1-yard run (Nick Brown kick), 14:54. Flames 14-10. Drive: 9 plays, 77 yards, 4:26.
- LIB - CJ Daniels 51-yard pass from Kaidon Salter (Nick Brown kick), 2:21. Flames 21-10. Drive: 4 plays, 62 yards, 1:15.

Third quarter

- SHSU - Al'Vonte Woodard 20 yard-pass from Keegan Shoemaker (Keegan Shoemaker pass incomplete), 4:36. Flames 21-16. Drive: 6 plays, 68 yards, 2:48.

Fourth quarter

- No scoring plays

Statistics	SHSU	LU
First downs	19	19
Total yards	327	448
Rushing yards	72	191
Passing yards	255	257
Turnovers	1	1
Time of possession	27:24	32:36

Team	Category	Player	Statistics
Sam Houston State	Passing	Keegan Shoemaker	27/41, 255 yards, 2 TD, INT
Sam Houston State	Rushing	Keegan Shoemaker	7 rushes, 52 yards
Sam Houston State	Receiving	Noah Smith	13 receptions, 97 yards
Liberty	Passing	Kaidon Salter	11/19, 257 yards, TD, INT
Liberty	Rushing	Quinton Cooley	17 rushes, 106 yards, TD
Liberty	Receiving	CJ Daniels	5 receptions, 157 yards, TD

=== At New Mexico State ===
Sam Houston State Bearkats at New Mexico State Aggies – Game summary

Quarter	1	2	3	4	Total
Bearkats	0	0	6	7	13
Aggies	14	13	0	0	27

at Aggie Memorial Stadium, Las Cruces, New Mexico

- Date: October 11
- Game time: 8:00 p.m. CDT/7:00 p.m. MDT
- Game weather: Clear, 80 °F (27 °C)
- Game attendance: 12,812
- Referee: Joe Lehring
- TV announcers (CBSSN): Carter Blackburn and Robert Turbin

Game information
First quarter
- NMSU – Diego Pavia 22-yard run (Ethan Albertson kick), 4:46. Aggies 7–0. Drive: 11 plays, 87 yards, 6:39.
- NMSU – Trent Hudson 78-yard pass from Diego Pavia (Ethan Albertson kick), 1:42. Aggies 14–0. Drive: 2 plays, 80 yards, 0:52.

Second quarter

- NMSU – Ethan Albertson 22-yard field goal, 10:39. Aggies 17–0. Drive: 9 plays, 66 yards, 4:07.
- NMSU – Ethan Albertson 39-yard field goal, 4:18. Aggies 20–0. Drive: 7 plays, 31 yards, 2:29.
- NMSU – Trent Hudson 12-yard pass from Diego Pavia (Ethan Albertson kick), 0:27. Aggies 27–0. Drive: 11 plays, 89 yards, 1:42.

Third quarter

- SHSU – Noah Smith 16-yard pass from Keegan Shoemaker (pass failed), 5:55. Aggies 27–6. Drive: 2 plays, 18 yards, 0:34.

Fourth quarter

- SHSU – Noah Smith 6-yard pass from Keegan Shoemaker (Colby Sessums kick), 12:01. Aggies 27–13. Drive: 6 plays, 70 yards, 2:44.

Statistics	SHSU	NMS
First downs	19	20
Total yards	367	458
Rushing yards	82	172
Passing yards	285	286
Turnovers	0	0
Time of possession	27:50	32:10

Team	Category	Player	Statistics
Sam Houston State	Passing	Keegan Shoemaker	32/48, 285 yards, 2 TD
Sam Houston State	Rushing	Keegan Shoemaker	7 rushes, 42 yards
Sam Houston State	Receiving	Malik Phillips	10 receptions, 118 yards
New Mexico State	Passing	Diego Pavia	20/36, 286 yards, 2 TD
New Mexico State	Rushing	Diego Pavia	15 rushes, 115 yards, TD
New Mexico State	Receiving	Trent Hudson	3 receptions, 122 yards, 2 TD

=== FIU ===
FIU Panthers at Sam Houston State Bearkats – Game summary

Quarter	1	2	3	4	Total
Panthers	0	0	0	0	0
Bearkats	0	0	0	0	0

at Bowers Stadium, Huntsville, Texas

- Date: October 18
- Game time: 6:00 p.m. CDT
- Game attendance: 7,543
- TV: CBSSN

Statistics	FIU	SHSU
First downs		
Total yards		
Rushing yards		
Passing yards		
Turnovers		
Time of possession		

Team	Category	Player	Statistics
FIU	Passing		
FIU	Rushing		
FIU	Receiving		
Sam Houston State	Passing		
Sam Houston State	Rushing		
Sam Houston State	Receiving		

=== UTEP ===
UTEP Miners at Sam Houston State Bearkats – Game summary

Quarter	1	2	3	4	Total
Miners	0	0	0	0	0
Bearkats	0	0	0	0	0

at Bowers Stadium, Huntsville, Texas

- Date: October 25
- Game time: 7:00 p.m. CDT
- TV: ESPN2

Statistics	UTEP	SHSU
First downs		
Total yards		
Rushing yards		
Passing yards		
Turnovers		
Time of possession		

Team	Category	Player	Statistics
UTEP	Passing		
UTEP	Rushing		
UTEP	Receiving		
Sam Houston State	Passing		
Sam Houston State	Rushing		
Sam Houston State	Receiving		

=== Kennesaw State ===
Kennesaw State Owls at Sam Houston State Bearkats – Game summary

Quarter	1	2	3	4	Total
Owls	14	7	0	0	21
Bearkats	0	7	7	10	24

at Bowers Stadium, Huntsville, Texas

- Date: November 4
- Game time: 12:00 p.m. CDT
- Game weather: Sunny
- Game attendance: 7,143
- Referee: Joe Lehring
- TV: ESPN+
- Box score, Recap

Game information
First quarter
- KENN - Michael Benefield 75-yard run (Conor Cummins kick), 11:00. Owls 0-7. Drive: 3 plays, 83 yards, 1:03.
- KENN - Micheal Benefield 3-yard run (Conor Cummins kick), 2:13. Owls 0-14. Drive: 4 plays, 6 yards, 1:57.

Second quarter

- SHSU - Noah Smith 24-yard pass from Keegan Shoemaker (Colby Sessums kick), 7:18. Owls 7-14. Drive: 7 plays, 80 yards, 2:35.
- KENN - Jonathan Murphy 57-yard run (Conor Cummins kick), 4:58. Owls 21-7. Drive: 5 plays, 75 yards, 2:20.

Third quarter

- SHSU - Elijah Sohn 5-yard pass from Keegan Shoemaker (Colby Sessums kick), 0:33. Owls 14-21. Drive: 13 plays, 74 yards, 5:08.

Fourth quarter

- SHSU - Jay Rockwell 2-yard pass from Keegan Shoemaker (Colby Sessums kick), 3:49. Tied 21-21. Drive: 16 plays, 80 yards, 9:24.
- SHSU - Colby Sessums 35-yard field goal, 0:00. Bearkats 24-21. Drive: 9 plays, 36 yards, 2:59.

Statistics	KSU	SHSU
First downs	9	27
Total yards	291	347
Rushing yards	247	105
Passing yards	44	242
Turnovers	1	3
Time of possession	24:06	35:54

Team	Category	Player	Statistics
Kennesaw State	Passing	Johnathan Murphy	8/14, 44 yards, INT
Kennesaw State	Rushing	Micheal Benefield	11 rushes, 108 yards, 2 TD
Kennesaw State	Receiving	Rowan Darnell	2 receptions, 18 yards
Sam Houston State	Passing	Keegan Shoemaker	30/38, 242 yards, 3 TD, INT
Sam Houston State	Rushing	Zach Hrbacek	18 rushes, 50 yards
Sam Houston State	Receiving	Noah Smith	7 receptions, 78 yards, TD

=== At Louisiana Tech ===
Sam Houston State Bearkats at Louisiana Tech Bulldogs – Game summary

Quarter	1	2	3	4	Total
Bearkats	7	7	14	14	42
Bulldogs	3	3	14	7	27

at Joe Aillet Stadium, Ruston, Louisiana

- Date: November 11
- Game time: 2:00 p.m. CST
- Game weather: Cloudy, 62 °F (17 °C), SW 8 mph
- Game attendance: 15,080
- Referee: Garrett Dickerson
- TV: ESPN+

Statistics	SHSU	LT
First downs	19	20
Total yards	413	524
Rushing yards	144	105
Passing yards	269	419
Turnovers	0	4
Time of possession	28:37	31:23

Team	Category	Player	Statistics
Sam Houston State	Passing	Keegan Shoemaker	18/28, 269 yards, TD
Sam Houston State	Rushing	Adrian Murdaugh	9 carries, 67 yards, TD
Sam Houston State	Receiving	Noah Smith	6 receptions, 115 yards
Louisiana Tech	Passing	Hank Bachmeier	29/42, 384 yards, 2 INT
Louisiana Tech	Rushing	Charvis Thornton	2 carries, 48 yards
Louisiana Tech	Receiving	Cyrus Allen	7 receptions, 170 yards, TD

=== At Western Kentucky ===
Sam Houston State Bearkats at Western Kentucky Hilltoppers – Game summary

Quarter	1	2	3	4	Total
Bearkats	0	0	0	0	0
Hilltoppers	0	0	0	0	0

at Houchens Industries–L. T. Smith Stadium, Bowling Green, Kentucky

- Date: November 18
- Game time: 2:30 p.m. CST

Statistics	SHSU	WKU
First downs		
Total yards		
Rushing yards		
Passing yards		
Turnovers		
Time of possession		

Team	Category	Player	Statistics
Sam Houston State	Passing		
Sam Houston State	Rushing		
Sam Houston State	Receiving		
Western Kentucky	Passing		
Western Kentucky	Rushing		
Western Kentucky	Receiving		

=== Middle Tennessee ===
Middle Tennessee Blue Raiders at Sam Houston State Bearkats – Game summary

Quarter	1	2	3	4	Total
Blue Raiders	0	0	0	0	0
Bearkats	0	0	0	0	0

at Bowers Stadium, Huntsville, Texas

- Date: November 25
- Game time: 11:00 a.m. CST

Statistics	MTSU	SHSU
First downs		
Total yards		
Rushing yards		
Passing yards		
Turnovers		
Time of possession		

Team	Category	Player	Statistics
Middle Tennessee	Passing		
Middle Tennessee	Rushing		
Middle Tennessee	Receiving		
Sam Houston State	Passing		
Sam Houston State	Rushing		
Sam Houston State	Receiving		
