= 2023 Liberty Flames football team =

American college football season

2023 Liberty Flames football

C-USA champion

C-USA Championship, W 49–35 vs. New Mexico State

Fiesta Bowl, L 6–45 vs. Oregon
- Conference: Conference USA

Ranking
- AP: No. 25
- Record: 13–1 (8–0 C-USA)
- Head coach: Jamey Chadwell (1st season)
- Co-offensive coordinators: Willy Korn (1st season); Newland Isaac (1st season)
- Offensive scheme: Up-tempo spread
- Co-defensive coordinators: Kyle Krantz (1st season); Skylor Magee (1st season)
- Base defense: Multiple 4–2–5
- Home stadium: Williams Stadium

2023 Conference USA football standings
	Conf.			Overall
Team	W		L	W		L
No. 25 Liberty y$	8	–	0	13	–	1
New Mexico State y	7	–	1	10	–	5
Jacksonville State*	6	–	2	9	–	4
Western Kentucky	5	–	3	8	–	5
Middle Tennessee	3	–	5	4	–	8
UTEP	2	–	6	3	–	9
Sam Houston*	2	–	6	3	–	9
Louisiana Tech	2	–	6	3	–	9
FIU	1	–	7	4	–	8
Championship: Liberty 49, New Mexico State 35
$ – Conference champion; y – Championship game participant; * – Ineligible for postseason play due to FCS-to-FBS transition rules; Rankings from AP Poll

The 2023 Liberty Flames football team represented Liberty University in the 2023 NCAA Division I FBS football season. The Flames played their home games at Williams Stadium in Lynchburg, Virginia, and competed as a first-year member of Conference USA. They were led by first-year head coach Jamey Chadwell. The Liberty Flames football team drew an average home attendance of 18,911 in 2023.

== Schedule ==
Liberty and Conference USA announced the 2023 football schedule on January 10, 2023.

Date	Time	Opponent	Rank	Site	TV	Result	Attendance
September 2	12:00 p.m.	Bowling Green*		Williams Stadium; Lynchburg, VA	CBSSN	W 34–24	18,811
September 9	6:00 p.m.	New Mexico State		Williams Stadium; Lynchburg, VA	ESPN+	W 33–17	20,123
September 16	12:00 p.m.	at Buffalo*		University at Buffalo Stadium; Amherst, NY	CBSSN	W 55–27	13,020
September 23	6:30 p.m.	at FIU		Riccardo Silva Stadium; Westchester, FL	ESPN+	W 38–6	17,437
October 5	7:00 p.m.	Sam Houston		Williams Stadium; Lynchburg, VA	CBSSN	W 21–16	17,100
October 10	7:30 p.m.	at Jacksonville State		Burgess–Snow Field at JSU Stadium; Jacksonville, AL	ESPNU	W 31–13	21,745
October 17	7:00 p.m.	Middle Tennessee		Williams Stadium; Lynchburg, VA	CBSSN	W 42–35	16,354
October 24	7:30 p.m.	at Western Kentucky		Houchens Industries–L. T. Smith Stadium; Bowling Green, KY	ESPNU	W 42–29	16,036
November 4	6:00 p.m.	Louisiana Tech^{†}		Williams Stadium; Lynchburg, VA	CBSSN	W 56–30	21,647
November 11	1:00 p.m.	Old Dominion*		Williams Stadium; Lynchburg, VA	ESPN+	W 38–10	21,481
November 18	1:00 p.m.	UMass*		Williams Stadium; Lynchburg, VA	ESPN+	W 49–25	16,860
November 25	3:30 p.m.	at UTEP	No. 25	Sun Bowl; El Paso, TX	CBSSN	W 42–28	10,240
December 1	7:00 p.m.	New Mexico State	No. 24	Williams Stadium; Lynchburg, VA (C-USA Championship Game)	CBSSN	W 49–35	20,077
January 1, 2024	1:00 p.m.	vs. No. 8 Oregon	No. 23	State Farm Stadium; Glendale, AZ (Fiesta Bowl)	ESPN	L 6–45	47,769
*Non-conference game; ^{†}Homecoming; Rankings from AP Poll (and CFP Rankings, after October 31) - Released prior to game; All times are in Eastern time

== Game summaries ==
=== vs Bowling Green ===
Game One – Bowling Green Falcons (0-0) at Liberty Flames (0-0) – Game summary

Quarter	1	2	3	4	Total
Bowling Green	0	14	10	0	24
Liberty	7	17	7	3	34

at Williams Stadium, Lynchburg, Virginia

- Date: Saturday, September 2, 2023
- Game time: 12:00 p.m. EDT
- Game weather: Sunny, 78 °F (26 °C)
- Game attendance: 18,811
- Referee: Jeremy Valentine
- TV announcers (CBSSN): Chick Hernandez and Taylor McHargue

Game information

First quarter

- (10:34) LIB – Billy Lucas 2-yard run (Teagen Lenderink kick) (Drive: 9 plays, 71 yards, 4:20; Liberty 7-0)

Second quarter

- (8:18) LIB – Vaughn Blue 12-yard pass from Kaidon Salter (Teagen Lenderink kick) (Drive: 8 plays, 66 yards, 3:52; Liberty 14-0)
- (6:51) LIB – Kobe Singleton 36-yard interception return Teagen Lenderink kick) (Liberty 21-0)
- (5:48) LIB – Teagen Lenderink 36-yard field goal (Drive: 4 plays, 6 yards, :54; Liberty 24-0)
- (3:36) BG – Ta'ron Keith 14-yard run (Alan Anaya kick) (Drive: 5 plays, 65 yards, 2:12; Liberty 24-7)
- (0:20) BG – Trent Simms 76-yard blocked field goal return (Alan Anaya kick)(Liberty 24-14)

Third quarter

- (11:36) BG – Alan Anaya 34-yard field goal (Drive: 10 plays, 72 yards, 3:20; Liberty 24-17)
- (8:35) LIB – Bentley Hanshaw 17-yard pass from Kaidon Salter (Teagen Lenderink kick) (Drive: 7 plays, 75 yards, 3:01; Liberty 31-17)
- (4:04) BG – Odieu Hiliare 32-yard pass from Camden Orth (Alan Anaya kick) (Drive: 11 plays, 75 yards, 4:31; Liberty 31-24)

Fourth quarter

- (2:52) LIB – Teagen Lenderink 36-yard field goal (Drive: 6 plays, 14 yards, 1:24; Liberty 34-24)

Statistics	BGSU	LIB
First downs	19	22
Total yards	62-328	69-389
Rushing yards	31–191	49–246
Passing yards	137	246
Passing: Comp–Att–Int	11–31–5	11–20–0
Time of possession	27:05	32:55

Team	Category	Player	Statistics
Bowling Green	Passing	Connor Bazelak	6/21, 71 yards, 3 INT
Bowling Green	Rushing	Taron Keith	3 carries, 69 yards, TD
Bowling Green	Receiving	Odieu Hillare	4 receptions, 59 yards, TD
Liberty	Passing	Kaidon Salter	11/20, 143 yards, 2 TD
Liberty	Rushing	Kaidon Salter	19 carries, 82 yards
Liberty	Receiving	Treon Sibley	3 receptions, 56 yards

=== vs New Mexico State ===
Game Two – New Mexico State Aggies (1-1) at Liberty Flames (1-0) – Game summary

Quarter	1	2	3	4	Total
New Mexico State	7	10	0	0	17
Liberty	7	16	10	0	33

at Williams Stadium, Lynchburg, Virginia

- Date: Saturday, September 9, 2023
- Game time: 4:00 p.m. MDT/6:00 p.m. EDT
- Game weather: Cloudy, 71 °F (22 °C)
- Game attendance: 20,123
- Referee: Ron Hudson
- TV announcers (ESPN+): Matt Warner, Joe Jauch, and Emily Austen

Game information

First quarter

- (11:22) NMSU – Jamoni Jones 10-yard run (Ethan Albertson kick) (Drive: 6 plays, 75 yards, 3:38; New Mexico State 7-0)
- (2:08) LIB – C. J. Daniels 40-yard pass from Kaidon Salter (Teagen Lenderink kick) (Drive: 6 plays, 71 yards, 3:15; Tied 7-7)

Second quarter

- (12:32) NMSU – Ethan Albertson 35-yard field goal (Drive: 10 plays, 69 yards, 4:30; New Mexico State 10-7)
- (8:40) LIB – Kaidon Salter 3-yard run (kick blocked) (Drive: 8 plays, 75 yards, 3:52; Liberty 13-10)
- (5:18) NMSU – Trent Hudson 13-yard pass from Diego Pavia (Ethan Albertson kick) (Drive: 6 plays, 75 yards, 3:22; New Mexico State 17-13)
- (2:13) LIB – Bentley Hanshaw 24-yard pass from Kaidon Salter (Teagen Lenderink kick) (Drive: 7 plays, 75 yards, 3:05; Liberty 20-17)
- (0:16) LIB – Teagen Lenderink 22-yard field goal (Drive: 10 plays, 80 yards, 1:32; Liberty 23-17

Third quarter

- (5:57) LIB – Kaidon Salter 2-yard run (Teagen Lenderink kick) (Drive: 17 plays, 75 yards, 9:03; Liberty 30-17)
- (1:24) LIB – Teagen Lenderink 29-yard field goal (Drive: 8 plays, 22 yards, 3:02; Liberty 33-17)

Fourth quarter

- No scoring plays

Statistics	NMSU	LIB
First downs	16	26
Total yards	50–339	77–526
Rushing yards	24–170	52–250
Passing yards	169	276
Passing: Comp–Att–Int	14–26–2	15–25–0
Time of possession	22:06	37:54

Team	Category	Player	Statistics
New Mexico State	Passing	Diego Pavia	12/21, 150 yards, TD, 2 INT
New Mexico State	Rushing	Diego Pavia	9 carries, 63 yards
New Mexico State	Receiving	Chris Bellamy	3 receptions, 74 yards
Liberty	Passing	Kaidon Salter	15/25, 276 yards, 2 TD
Liberty	Rushing	Quinton Cooley	20 carries, 106 yards
Liberty	Receiving	C. J. Daniels	4 receptions, 129 yards, TD

=== at Buffalo ===
Game Three – Liberty Flames (2–0) at Buffalo Bulls (0–2) – Game summary

Quarter	1	2	3	4	Total
Liberty	10	14	17	14	55
Buffalo	0	14	7	6	27

at University at Buffalo Stadium • Amherst, New York

- Date: September 16, 2023
- Game time: 12 p.m. EDT
- Game weather: 69 °F (21 °C); Sunny
- Game attendance: 13,020
- Referee: Greg Sujack
- TV announcers (CBSSN): Jason Knapp (play-by-play); Malik Zaire (analyst)

Game information

First quarter

- (11:18) LIB – Nick Brown 39-yard field goal (Drive: 9 plays, 52 yards, 3:38; Liberty 3–0)
- (5:43) LIB – Treon Sibley 56-yard pass from Kaidon Salter (Nick Brown kick) (Drive: 3 plays, 67 yards, 1:13; Liberty 10–0)

Second quarter

- (11:03) LIB – Elijah Smoot 42-yard pass from Kaidon Salter (Nick Brown kick) (Drive: 6 plays, 85 yards, 2:50; Liberty 17–0)
- (8:33) LIB – Kaidon Salter 1-yard run (Nick Brown kick) (Drive: 4 plays, 27 yards, 1:47; Liberty 24–0)
- (5:38) BUFF – Darrell Harding Jr. 7-yard pass from Cole Snyder (Alex McNulty kick) (Drive: 8 plays, 75 yards, 2:55; Liberty 24–7)
- (0:28) BUFF – Nik McMillan 33-yard pass from Cole Snyder (Alex McNulty kick) (Drive: 8 plays, 89 yards, 1:13; Liberty 24–14)

Third quarter

- (12:13) LIB – Nick Brown 35-yard field goal (Drive: 4 plays, 1 yards, 1:24; Liberty 27–14)
- (8:40) LIB – Elijah Smoot 33-yard pass from Kaidon Salter (Nick Brown kick) (Drive: 2 plays, 42 yards, 1:00; Liberty 34–14)
- (4:20) BUFF – Ron Cook 2-yard pass from Cole Snyder (Alex McNulty kick) (Drive: 10 plays, 77 yards, 4:18; Liberty 34–21)
- (3:25) LIB – C.J. Daniels 75-yard pass from Kaidon Salter (Nick Brown kick) (Drive: 3 plays, 75 yards, 0:55; Liberty 41–21)

Fourth quarter

- (14:57) LIB – Austin Henderson 3-yard pass from Kaidon Salter (Nick Brown kick) (Drive: 3 plays, 31 yards, 1:31; Liberty 48–21)
- (10:14) BUFF – Marlyn Johnson 3-yard pass from Cole Snyder (2-pt conversion failed) (Drive: 10 plays, 75 yards, 4:43; Liberty 48–27)
- (6:24) LIB – Aaron Bedgood 49-yard run (Nick Brown kick) (Drive: 1 plays, 49 yards, 0:10; Liberty 55–27)

Statistics	LIB	BUFF
First downs	19	22
Total yards	65–569	81–363
Rushing yards	36–225	30–87
Passing yards	344	276
Passing: Comp–Att–Int	16–29–0	29–51–2
Time of possession	28:35	31:25

Team	Category	Player	Statistics
Liberty	Passing	Kaidon Salter	16/26, 344 yards, TD
Liberty	Rushing	Kaidon Salter	10 carries, 66 yards, TD
Liberty	Receiving	Treon Sibler	3 receptions, 106 yards, TD
Buffalo	Passing	Cole Snyder	29/51, 276 yards, 4 TD, 2 INT
Buffalo	Rushing	Mike Washington	11 carries, 37 yards
Buffalo	Receiving	Nik McMillan	4 receptions, 72 yards, TD

=== at FIU ===
Liberty Flames (3-0) at FIU Panthers (3-1) – Game Summary

Quarter	1	2	3	4	Total
Liberty	14	10	14	0	38
Florida International	6	0	0	0	6

at Riccardo Silva Stadium • Westchester, Florida

- Date: September 23rd
- Game time: 6:30 p.m. EST
- Game weather: 82 °F (28 °C); Cloudy
- Game attendance: 17,437
- Referee: Garrett Dickerson
- TV announcers (ESPN+): AJ Ricketts and Jonathan Zipper

Game information

First quarter

- (11:21) LIB – Bentley Hanshaw 9-yard pass from Kaidon Salter (Nick Brown kick) (Drive: 8 plays, 75 yards, 3:35; Liberty 7-0)
- (9:04) LIB – Treon Sibley 68-yard pass from Kaidon Salter (Nick Brown kick) (Drive: 3 plays, 72 yards, :54; Liberty 14-0)
- (1:40) FIU – Keyone Jenkins 1-yard run (kick failed) (Drive: 10 plays, 94 yards, 4:50; Liberty 14-6)

Second quarter

- (2:56) LIB – Billy Lucas 18-yard run (Nick Brown kick) (Drive: 6 plays, 62 yards, 2:52; Liberty 21-6)
- (1:50) LIB – Nick Brown 41-yard field goal (Drive: 4 plays, 3 yards, :48; Liberty 24-6)

Third quarter

- (10:09) LIB – Kaidon Salter 2-yard run (Nick Brown kick) (Drive: 6 plays, 46 yards, 3:14; Liberty 31-6)
- (3:48) LIB – Kaidon Salter 1-yard run (Nick Brown kick) (Drive: 7 plays, 65 yards, 4:52; Liberty 38-6)

Statistics	LIB	FIU
First downs	22	11
Plays–yards	65-520	57-211
Rushes–yards	44-364	33-64
Passing yards	156	147
Passing: comp–att–int	11-21-1	11-24-1
Turnovers		
Time of possession	33:09	26:51

Team	Category	Player	Statistics
Liberty	Passing	Kaidon Salter	11/21, 156 yards, 2TD, 1INT
Liberty	Rushing	Quinton Cooley, Billy Lucas	12 carries, 102 yards / 11 carries, 102 yards, 1TD
Liberty	Receiving	Treon Sibley	2 receptions, 83 yards, 1TD
Florida International	Passing	Keyone Jenkins	9/21, 133 yards, 1INT
Florida International	Rushing	Kejon Owens	11 carries, 42 yards
Florida International	Receiving	Kris Mitchell	3 receptions, 89 yards

=== Sam Houston ===
Game Five – Sam Houston Bearkats (0-4) at Liberty Flames (4-0) – Game summary

Quarter	1	2	3	4	Total
Sam Houston	10	0	6	0	16
Liberty	7	14	0	0	21

at Williams Stadium
Lynchburg, VA

- Game time: 6:00 p.m. CDT/7:00 p.m. EDT
- Game weather: Cloudy, 68 °F (20 °C)
- Game attendance: 17,100
- Referee: Rory Bernard
- TV announcers (CBSSN): Chick Hernandez and Robert Turbin
- Box score, Recap

Game information

First quarter

- (12:52) - LIB - Kaidon Salter 10-yard run (Nick Brown kick), 12:52. Flames 7–0. Drive: 5 plays, 74 yards, 2:02.
- (6:46) - SHSU - Al'Vonte Woodard 7-yard pass from Keegan Shoemaker (Colby Sessums kick), 6:46. Tied 7-7. Drive: 12 plays, 85 yards, 6:00.
- (4:27) - SHSU - Colby Sessums 33-yard field goal, 4:27. Bearkats 10-7. Drive: 4 plays, 4 yards, 1:32.

Second quarter

- (14:54) - LIB - Quinton Cooley 1-yard run (Nick Brown kick), 14:54. Flames 14-10. Drive: 9 plays, 77 yards, 4:26.
- (2:21) - LIB - CJ Daniels 51-yard pass from Kaidon Salter (Nick Brown kick), 2:21. Flames 21-10. Drive: 4 plays, 62 yards, 1:15.

Third quarter

- (4:36) - SHSU - Al'Vonte Woodard 20 yard-pass from Keegan Shoemaker (Keegan Shoemaker pass incomplete), 4:36. Flames 21-16. Drive: 6 plays, 68 yards, 2:48.

Statistics	SHSU	LIB
First downs	19	19
Total yards	327	448
Rushing yards	72	191
Passing yards	255	257
Turnovers	1	1
Time of possession	27:24	32:36

Team	Category	Player	Statistics
Sam Houston State	Passing	Keegan Shoemaker	27/41, 255 yards, 2 TD, INT
Sam Houston State	Rushing	Keegan Shoemaker	7 rushes, 52 yards
Sam Houston State	Receiving	Noah Smith	13 receptions, 97 yards
Liberty	Passing	Kaidon Salter	11/19, 257 yards, TD, INT
Liberty	Rushing	Quinton Cooley	17 rushes, 106 yards, TD
Liberty	Receiving	CJ Daniels	5 receptions, 157 yards, TD

=== at Jacksonville State ===
Liberty Flames (5-0) vs Jacksonville State Gamecocks (5-1)

Team	1	2	3	4	Total
Flames	0	0	0	0	0
Gamecocks	0	0	0	0	0

- Date: October 10
- Location: Burgess-Snow Field at JSU Stadium
  Jacksonville, Alabama
- Game start: 7:30 p.m. CST/5:30 p.m. PST
- Game attendance: 21,745
- TV announcers (ESPNU): TBD

Scoring summary

Statistics	Liberty	Jacksonville State
First downs		
Plays–yards		
Rushes–yards		
Passing yards		
Passing: comp–att–int		
Turnovers		
Time of possession		

Team	Category	Player	Statistics
Liberty	Passing		
Liberty	Rushing		
Liberty	Receiving		
Jacksonville State	Passing		
Jacksonville State	Rushing		
Jacksonville State	Receiving		

=== vs Middle Tennessee ===
Game Seven – Middle Tennessee Blue Raiders (2-5) at Liberty Flames (6-0) – Game summary

Quarter	1	2	3	4	Total
Middle Tennessee	14	7	14	0	35
Liberty	14	7	14	7	42

at Williams Stadium • Lynchburg, Virginia

- Date: Tuesday, October 17, 2023
- Game time: 7:00 p.m. EST
- Game attendance: 16,354
- TV announcers (CBSSN): Carter Blackburn (play-by-play) and Brock Vereen (analyst)

Game information

First quarter

- (13:36) MTSU – DJ Riles 3-yard pass from Nicholas Vattiato (Zeke Rankin kick) (Drive: 3 plays, 22 yards, 1:04; Middle Tennessee 7-0)
- (8:37) LIB – Quinton Cooley 5-yard run (Nick Brown kick) (Drive: 10 plays, 75 yards, 4:59; Tied 7-7)
- (6:43) MTSU – Elijah Metcalf 20-yard pass from Nicholas Vattiato (Zeke Rankin kick) (Drive: 5 plays, 75 yards, 1:54; Middle Tennessee 14-7)
- (0:49) LIB – Quinton Cooley 9-yard run (Nick Brown kick) (Drive: 13 plays, 97 yards, 5:49; Tied 14-14)

Second quarter

- (8:29) LIB – Billy Lucas 1-yard run (Nick Brown kick) (Drive: 9 plays, 77 yards, 4:47; Liberty 21-14)
- (0:20) MTSU – Zack Dobson 2-yard run (Zeke Rankin kick) (Drive: 11 plays, 80 yards, 3:00; Tied 21-21)

Third quarter

- (12:43) MTSU – DJ England-Chisholm 36-yard pass from Nicholas Vattiato (Zeke Rankin kick) (Drive: 2 plays, 47 yards, 0:21; Middle Tennessee 28-21)
- (6:41) LIB – Bentley Hanshaw 23-yard pass from Kaidon Salter (Nick Brown kick) (Drive: 12 plays, 77 yards, 5:56; Tied 28-28)
- (6:10) MTSU – Zack Dobson 72-yard pass from Nicholas Vattiato (Zeke Rankin kick) (Drive: 2 plays, 75 yards, 0:31; Middle Tennessee 35-28)
- (2:50) LIB – Quinton Cooley 10-yard run (Nick Brown kick) (Drive: 8 plays, 61 yards, 3:12; Tied 35-35)

Fourth quarter

- (14:37) LIB – CJ Daniels 37-yard pass from Kaidon Salter (Nick Brown kick) (Drive: 4 plays, 58 yards, 1:15; Liberty 42-35)

Statistics	MTSU	LIB
First downs	23	33
Total yards	63–428	81–541
Rushing yards	26–96	61–401
Passing yards	332	140
Passing: Comp–Att–Int	24–37–2	12–20–1
Time of possession	22:40	37:20

Team	Category	Player	Statistics
Middle Tennessee	Passing	Nicholas Vattiato	24/37, 332 yards, 4 TD, 2 INT
Middle Tennessee	Rushing	Jaiden Cradle	12 carries, 50 yards
Middle Tennessee	Receiving	Zack Dobson	2 receptions, 82 yards, TD
Liberty	Passing	Kaidon Salter	12/20, 140 yards, 2 TD, INT
Liberty	Rushing	Kaidon Salter	16 carries, 160 yards
Liberty	Receiving	CJ Daniels	6 receptions, 71 yards, TD

=== vs New Mexico State (C-USA Championship Game) ===
New Mexico State Aggies at No. 24 Liberty Flames (C-USA Championship Game) – Game summary

Quarter	1	2	3	4	Total
Aggies	7	14	14	0	35
No. 24 Flames	7	14	14	14	49

at Williams Stadium, Lynchburg, Virginia

- Date: December 1
- Game time: 5:00 p.m. MST/7:00 p.m. EST
- Game weather: Rain, 44 °F (7 °C)
- Game attendance: 20,077
- Referee: Ron Hudson
- TV announcers (CBSSN): Rich Waltz, Aaron Taylor, and Amanda Guerra

Game information
First quarter
- NMSU – Diego Pavia 25-yard run (Ethan Albertson kick), 10:08. Aggies 7–0. Drive: 8 plays, 75 yards, 4:52.
- LIB – Quinton Cooley 1-yard run (Nick Brown kick), 6:09. Tied 7–7. Drive: 9 plays, 80 yards, 3:52.

Second quarter

- NMSU – Ron Tiavaasue 10-yard pass from Diego Pavia (Ethan Albertson kick), 14:55. Aggies 14–7. Drive: 11 plays, 75 yards, 6:14.
- LIB – Quinton Cooley 12-yard run (Nick Brown kick), 5:38. Tied 14–14. Drive: 5 plays, 55 yards, 2:17.
- LIB – Noah Frith 26-yard pass from Kaidon Salter (Nick Brown kick), 0:27. Flames 21–14. Drive: 8 plays, 89 yards, 1:24.
- NMSU – Trent Hudson 17-yard pass from Diego Pavia (Ethan Albertson kick), 0:03. Tied 21–21. Drive: 4 plays, 58 yards, 0:22.

Third quarter

- LIB – Quinton Cooley 4-yard run (Nick Brown kick), 13:15. Flames 28–21. Drive: 5 plays, 71 yards, 1:40.
- LIB – C. J. Daniels 20-yard pass from Kaidon Salter (Nick Brown kick), 9:19. Flames 35–21. Drive: 5 plays, 64 yards, 2:30.
- NMSU – Jonathan Brady 75-yard pass from Diego Pavia (Ethan Albertson kick), 9:07. Flames 35–28. Drive: 1 play, 75 yards, 0:12.
- NMSU – Trent Hudson 11-yard pass from Blaze Berlowitz (Ethan Albertson kick), 2:57. Tied 35–35. Drive: 6 plays, 80 yards, 2:24.

Fourth quarter

- LIB – Billy Lucas 2-yard run (Nick Brown kick), 13:51. Flames 42–35. Drive: 9 plays, 80 yards, 4:00.
- LIB – Kaidon Salter 35-yard run (Nick Brown kick), 8:23. Flames 49–35. Drive: 4 plays, 80 yards, 1:19.

Statistics	NMSU	LIB
First downs	28	35
Total yards	499	712
Rushing yards	177	393
Passing yards	322	319
Turnovers	1	0
Time of possession	30:13	29:47

Team	Category	Player	Statistics
New Mexico State	Passing	Diego Pavia	11/16, 188 yards, 3 TD
New Mexico State	Rushing	Diego Pavia	5 rushes, 45 yards, TD
New Mexico State	Receiving	Trent Hudson	7 receptions, 112 yards, 2 TD
Liberty	Passing	Kaidon Salter	20/25, 319 yards, 2 TD
Liberty	Rushing	Kaidon Salter	12 rushes, 165 yards, TD
Liberty	Receiving	C. J. Daniels	7 receptions, 157 yards, TD

=== vs No. 8 Oregon (Fiesta Bowl) ===
2024 Vrbo Fiesta Bowl
No. 23 Liberty Flames (13-0, 8-0) vs No. 8 Oregon Duck (11-2, 8-1)

Team	1	2	3	4	Total
No. 23 Flames	6	0	0	0	6
• No. 8 Ducks	3	28	7	7	45

- Date: Monday, January 1st, 2024
- Location: State Farm Stadium
  Glendale, Arizona
- Game start: 1:00 pm EST/11:00 am MST/10:00 am PST
- Game attendance: 47,769
- Referee: Steve Marlowe
- TV announcers (ESPN): Bob Wischusen (play-by-play), Robert Griffin III (analyst), and Kris Budden (sideline)

Scoring summary

Statistics	No. 23 Liberty	No. 8 Oregon
First downs	15	28
Plays–yards	52–294	71–584
Rushes–yards	28–168	29–183
Passing yards	126	401
Passing: comp–att–int	15–24–2	33–42–0
Turnovers		
Time of possession	24:45	35:15

Team	Category	Player	Statistics
No. 23 Liberty	Passing	Kaidon Salter	15/24, 126 yards, TD, INT
No. 23 Liberty	Rushing	Quinton Cooley	8 carries, 79 yards
No. 23 Liberty	Receiving	CJ Daniels	8 catches, 79 yards
No. 8 Oregon	Passing	Bo Nix	28/35, 363 yards, 5 TD
No. 8 Oregon	Rushing	Bucky Irving	14 carries, 117 yards, TD
No. 8 Oregon	Receiving	Tez Johnson	11 catches, 172 yards, TD

== Rankings ==
Ranking movements Legend: ██ Increase in ranking ██ Decrease in ranking — = Not ranked RV = Received votes
	Week															
Poll	Pre	1	2	3	4	5	6	7	8	9	10	11	12	13	14	Final
AP	RV	—	—	—	—	—	—	RV	RV	RV	25	25	22	20	18	25
Coaches	—	—	—	—	RV	—	RV	RV	RV	RV	RV	RV	22	22	20	RV
CFP	Not released									—	—	—	25	24	23	Not released
