= 2023 Middle Tennessee Blue Raiders football team =

American college football season

2023 Middle Tennessee Blue Raiders football
- Conference: Conference USA
- Record: 4–8 (3–5 C-USA)
- Head coach: Rick Stockstill (18th season)
- Offensive coordinator: Mitch Stewart (2nd season)
- Offensive scheme: Multiple
- Defensive coordinator: Scott Shafer (7th season)
- Base defense: Multiple 4–3
- Home stadium: Johnny "Red" Floyd Stadium

2023 Conference USA football standings
	Conf.			Overall
Team	W		L	W		L
No. 25 Liberty y$	8	–	0	13	–	1
New Mexico State y	7	–	1	10	–	5
Jacksonville State*	6	–	2	9	–	4
Western Kentucky	5	–	3	8	–	5
Middle Tennessee	3	–	5	4	–	8
UTEP	2	–	6	3	–	9
Sam Houston*	2	–	6	3	–	9
Louisiana Tech	2	–	6	3	–	9
FIU	1	–	7	4	–	8
Championship: Liberty 49, New Mexico State 35
$ – Conference champion; y – Championship game participant; * – Ineligible for postseason play due to FCS-to-FBS transition rules; Rankings from AP Poll

The 2023 Middle Tennessee Blue Raiders football team represented Middle Tennessee State University as a member of Conference USA (C-USA) during the 2023 NCAA Division I FBS football season. Led by Rick Stockstill in his 18th and final season as head coach, the Blue Raiders compiled an overall record of 4–8 with a mark of 3–5 in conference play, placing fifth in C-USA. The team played home games at Johnny "Red" Floyd Stadium in Murfreesboro, Tennessee.

Stockstill was fired on November 27, two days after the final game of the season. He finished his 18-year tenure at Middle Tennessee with a record of 113–111. At the time of his firing, Stockstill was the fourth-longest tenured head coach in the NCAA Division I Football Bowl Subdivision (FBS).

== Schedule ==
Middle Tennessee and Conference USA announced the 2023 football schedule on January 10, 2023.

Date	Time	Opponent	Site	TV	Result	Attendance
September 2	6:30 p.m.	at No. 4 Alabama*	Bryant–Denny Stadium; Tuscaloosa, AL	SECN	L 7–56	100,077
September 9	6:00 p.m.	at Missouri*	Faurot Field; Columbia, MO	SECN+/ESPN+	L 19–23	57,645
September 16	6:00 p.m.	Murray State*	Johnny "Red" Floyd Stadium; Murfreesboro, TN	ESPN+	W 35–14	16,605
September 23	6:00 p.m.	Colorado State*	Johnny "Red" Floyd Stadium; Murfreesboro, TN	ESPN+	L 23–31	19,806
September 28	6:30 p.m.	at Western Kentucky	Houchens Industries–L. T. Smith Stadium; Bowling Green, KY (100 Miles of Hate)	CBSSN	L 10–31	14,712
October 4	7:00 p.m.	Jacksonville State	Johnny "Red" Floyd Stadium; Murfreesboro, TN	ESPNU	L 30–45	13,066
October 10	6:00 p.m.	Louisiana Tech	Johnny "Red" Floyd Stadium; Murfreesboro, TN	CBSSN	W 31–23	9,602
October 17	6:00 p.m.	at Liberty	Williams Stadium; Lynchburg, VA	CBSSN	L 35–42	16,354
November 4	5:00 p.m.	at New Mexico State	Aggie Memorial Stadium; Las Cruces, NM	ESPN+	L 7–13	15,727
November 11	2:30 p.m.	FIU	Johnny "Red" Floyd Stadium; Murfreesboro, TN	ESPN+	W 40–6	11,111
November 18	1:00 p.m.	UTEP	Johnny "Red" Floyd Stadium; Murfreesboro, TN	ESPN+	W 34–30	9,122
November 25	11:00 a.m.	at Sam Houston	Bowers Stadium; Huntsville, TX	ESPN+	L 20–23	5,349
*Non-conference game; Rankings from AP Poll (and CFP Rankings, after November 1) - Released prior to game; All times are in Central time

== Game summaries ==
=== at No. 4 Alabama ===
Uniform Combination
Helmet	Jersey	Pants

Game One – Middle Tennessee Blue Raiders (0–0) at No. 4 Alabama Crimson Tide (0–0)

Quarter	1	2	3	4	Total
Middle Tennessee	0	0	7	0	7
No. 4 Alabama	14	14	14	14	56

at Bryant–Denny Stadium • Tuscaloosa, Alabama

- Date: Saturday, September 2, 2023
- Game time: 6:30 p.m. CDT
- Game weather: Cloudy • Temperature: 82 °F (28 °C)
- Game attendance: 100,077
- Referee: Daniel Gautreaux
- TV announcers (SECN): Tom Hart (play-by-play), Jordan Rodgers (analyst), and Cole Cubelic (sideline)

Game information

First quarter

- (10:49) ALA – Jalen Milroe 21-yard run (Will Reichard kick) (Drive: 6 plays, 63 yards, 2:58; Alabama 7-0)
- (4:15) ALA – Jase McClellan 1-yard run (Will Reichard kick) (Drive: 11 plays, 47 yards, 5:06; Alabama 14–0)

Second quarter

- (3:07) ALA – Jalen Milroe 13-yard run (Will Reichard kick) (Drive: 2 plays, 42 yards, 0:35; Alabama 21–0)
- (1:58) ALA – Isaiah Bond 47-yard pass from Jalen Milroe (Will Reichard kick) (Drive: 1 play, 47 yards, 0:07; Alabama 28–0)

Third quarter

- (12:54) ALA – Jermaine Burton 48-yard pass from Jalen Milroe (Will Reichard kick) (Drive: 6 plays, 75 yards, 2:06; Alabama 35-0)
- (10:25) ALA – Amari Niblack 29-yard pass from Jalen Milroe (Will Reichard kick) (Drive: 2 plays, 34 yards, 0:41; Alabama 42-0)
- (0:32) MTSU – Bryce Bailey 7-yard pass from Nicholas Vattiato (Zeke Rankin kick) (Drive: 11 plays, 68 yards, 5:58; Alabama 42-7)

Fourth quarter

- (10:38) ALA – Tyler Buchner 9-yard run (Will Reichard kick) (Drive: 10 plays, 77 yards, 4:47; Alabama 49–7)
- (5:58) ALA – Ty Simpson 1-yard run (Conor Talty kick) (Drive: 6 plays, 33 yards, 3:17; Alabama 56–7)

Statistics	MTSU	ALA
First downs	13	23
Total yards	211	431
Rushes/yards	26–78	40–205
Passing yards	133	226
Passing: Comp–Att–Int	24–35–1	17–24–0
Time of possession	30:57	29:03

Team	Category	Player	Statistics
Middle Tennessee	Passing	Nicholas Vattiato	21/32, 127 yards, TD, INT
Middle Tennessee	Rushing	Jekail Middlebrook	8 carries, 32 yards
Middle Tennessee	Receiving	Jaiden Credle	4 receptions, 25 yards
Alabama	Passing	Jalen Milroe	13/18, 194 yards, 3 TD
Alabama	Rushing	Jalen Milroe	7 carries, 48 yards, 2 TD
Alabama	Receiving	Isaiah Bond	5 receptions, 76 yards, TD

=== at Missouri ===
Uniform Combination
Helmet	Jersey	Pants

Game Two – Middle Tennessee Blue Raiders (0–1) at Missouri Tigers (1–0) – Game summary

Quarter	1	2	3	4	Total
Middle Tennessee	0	7	3	9	19
Missouri	3	7	6	7	23

at Faurot Field • Columbia, Missouri

- Date: Saturday, September 9, 2023
- Game time: 6:00 p.m. CDT
- Game weather: Sunny • Temperature: 74 °F (23 °C)
- Game attendance: 57,645
- TV announcers (ESPN+): Mark Neely (play-by-play) and Barrett Brooks (analyst)

Game information

First quarter

- (5:21) MIZZ – Harrison Mevis 38-yard field goal (Drive: 8 plays, 34 yards, 3:58; Missouri 3-0)

Second quarter

- (8:14) MTSU – Kalani Norris 3-yard pass from Nicholas Vattiato (Zeke Rankin kick) (Drive: 14 plays, 86 yards, 7:17; Middle Tennessee 7-3)
- (0:24) MIZZ – Brady Cook 1-yard run (Harrison Mevis kick) (Drive: 16 plays, 71 yards, 7:45; Missouri 10-7)

Third quarter

- (8:39) MTSU – Zeke Rankin 25-yard field goal (Drive: 14 plays, 68 yards, 6:21; Tied 10-10)
- (4:58) MIZZ – Theo Wease Jr. 5-yard pass from Brady Cook (Harrison Mevis kick failed) (Drive: 8 plays, 80 yards, 3:35; Missouri 16-10)

Fourth quarter

- (14:53) MIZZ – Nathaniel Peat 49-yard pass from Brady Cook (Harrison Mevis kick) (Drive: 7 plays, 82 yards, 2:39; Missouri 23-10)
- (6:57) MTSU – Justin Olson 13-yard pass from Nicholas Vattiato (Zeke Rankin kick) (Drive: 11 plays, 84 yards, 3:30; Missouri 23-17)
- (6:07) MTSU – Team Safety (Missouri 23-19)

Statistics	MTSU	MIZZ
First downs	16	21
Total yards	65–285	65–316
Rushes/yards	29-71	46-112
Passing yards	214	204
Passing: Comp–Att–Int	22-36-0	14-19-0
Time of possession	28:00	32:00

Team	Category	Player	Statistics
Middle Tennessee	Passing	Nicholas Vattiato	22-36, 214 yards, 2 TD
Middle Tennessee	Rushing	Frank Peasant	13 carries, 35 yards
Middle Tennessee	Receiving	Elijah Metcalf	5 receptions, 70 yards
Missouri	Passing	Brady Cook	14-19, 204 yards, 2 TD
Missouri	Rushing	Cody Schrader	23 carries, 84 yards
Missouri	Receiving	Luther Burden III	8 receptions, 117 yards

=== at Liberty ===
Game Eight – Middle Tennessee Blue Raiders (2–5) at Liberty Flames (6–0) – Game summary

Quarter	1	2	3	4	Total
Middle Tennessee	14	7	14	0	35
Liberty	14	7	14	7	42

at Williams Stadium • Lynchburg, Virginia

- Date: Tuesday, October 17, 2023
- Game time: 7:00 p.m. EST
- Game attendance: 16,354
- TV announcers (CBSSN): Carter Blackburn (play-by-play) and Brock Vereen (analyst)

Game information

First quarter

- (13:36) MTSU – DJ Riles 3-yard pass from Nicholas Vattiato (Zeke Rankin kick) (Drive: 3 plays, 22 yards, 1:04; Middle Tennessee 7-0)
- (8:37) LIB – Quinton Cooley 5-yard run (Nick Brown kick) (Drive: 10 plays, 75 yards, 4:59; Tied 7-7)
- (6:43) MTSU – Elijah Metcalf 20-yard pass from Nicholas Vattiato (Zeke Rankin kick) (Drive: 5 plays, 75 yards, 1:54; Middle Tennessee 14-7)
- (0:49) LIB – Quinton Cooley 9-yard run (Nick Brown kick) (Drive: 13 plays, 97 yards, 5:49; Tied 14-14)

Second quarter

- (8:29) LIB – Billy Lucas 1-yard run (Nick Brown kick) (Drive: 9 plays, 77 yards, 4:47; Liberty 21-14)
- (0:20) MTSU – Zack Dobson 2-yard run (Zeke Rankin kick) (Drive: 11 plays, 80 yards, 3:00; Tied 21-21)

Third quarter

- (12:43) MTSU – DJ England-Chisholm 36-yard pass from Nicholas Vattiato (Zeke Rankin kick) (Drive: 2 plays, 47 yards, 0:21; Middle Tennessee 28-21)
- (6:41) LIB – Bentley Hanshaw 23-yard pass from Kaidon Salter (Nick Brown kick) (Drive: 12 plays, 77 yards, 5:56; Tied 28-28)
- (6:10) MTSU – Zack Dobson 72-yard pass from Nicholas Vattiato (Zeke Rankin kick) (Drive: 2 plays, 75 yards, 0:31; Middle Tennessee 35-28)
- (2:50) LIB – Quinton Cooley 10-yard run (Nick Brown kick) (Drive: 8 plays, 61 yards, 3:12; Tied 35-35)

Fourth quarter

- (14:37) LIB – CJ Daniels 37-yard pass from Kaidon Salter (Nick Brown kick) (Drive: 4 plays, 58 yards, 1:15; Liberty 42-35)

Statistics	MTSU	LIB
First downs	23	33
Total yards	63–428	81–541
Rushing yards	26–96	61–401
Passing yards	332	140
Passing: Comp–Att–Int	24–37–2	12–20–1
Time of possession	22:40	37:20

Team	Category	Player	Statistics
Middle Tennessee	Passing	Nicholas Vattiato	24/37, 332 yards, 4 TD, 2 INT
Middle Tennessee	Rushing	Jaiden Cradle	12 carries, 50 yards
Middle Tennessee	Receiving	Zack Dobson	2 receptions, 82 yards, TD
Liberty	Passing	Kaidon Salter	12/20, 140 yards, 2 TD, INT
Liberty	Rushing	Kaidon Salter	16 carries, 160 yards
Liberty	Receiving	CJ Daniels	6 receptions, 71 yards, TD

=== at New Mexico State ===
Game Nine – Middle Tennessee Blue Raiders (2–6) at New Mexico State Aggies (6–3) – Game summary

Quarter	1	2	3	4	Total
Blue Raiders	0	7	0	0	7
Aggies	0	10	3	0	13

at Aggie Memorial Stadium, Las Cruces, New Mexico

- Date: Saturday, November 4, 2023
- Game time: 5:00 p.m. CDT
- Game weather: Sunny, 79 °F (26 °C)
- Game attendance: 15,727
- TV announcers (ESPN+): Adam Young (play-by-play), Danny Knee (analyst) and Tatiana Favela (sideline)

Game information
'First quarter

No scoring plays

Second quarter

- NMSU – Ron Tiavaasue 1-yard run (Ethan Albertson kick), 10:17. Aggies 7–0. Drive: 9 plays, 80 yards, 6:43.
- MTSU – D. J. England-Chisolm 27-yard pass from Nicholas Vattiato (Zeke Rankin kick), 0:48. Tied 7–7. Drive: 6 plays, 79 yards, 0:54.
- NMSU – Ethan Albertson 26-yard field goal, 0:00. Aggies 10–7. Drive: 7 plays, 67 yards, 0:48.

Third quarter

- NMSU – Ethan Albertson 38-yard field goal, 0:51. Aggies 13–7. Drive: 11 plays, 66 yards, 6:18.

Fourth quarter

No scoring plays

Statistics	MTSU	NMSU
First downs	17	21
Total yards	346	402
Rushing yards	168	182
Passing yards	178	220
Turnovers	1	1
Time of possession	24:13	35:47

Team	Category	Player	Statistics
Middle Tennessee	Passing	Nicholas Vattiato	20/36, 178 yards, TD, INT
Middle Tennessee	Rushing	Nicholas Vattiato	18 rushes, 96 yards
Middle Tennessee	Receiving	Elijah Metcalf	5 receptions, 69 yards
New Mexico State	Passing	Diego Pavia	16/31, 220 yards, INT
New Mexico State	Rushing	Monte Watkins	5 rushes, 68 yards
New Mexico State	Receiving	Eli Stowers	6 receptions, 83 yards

== Personnel ==
=== Roster ===
2023 Middle Tennessee Blue Raiders Football
Quarterbacks: 4 – Kyle Lowe – (redshirt) Freshman (5'11, 198); 5 – DJ Riles – (redshirt) Freshman (6'0, 193); 10 – Jakson Judge – Freshman (6'1, 198); 11 – Nicholas Vattiato – (redshirt) Sophomore (6'1, 196); 12 – Sam Driggers – Freshman (5'11, 205); 16 – Ren Hefley – (redshirt) Junior (6'1, 192); 18 – Stone Frost – (redshirt) Junior (5'11, 207); Running backs: 19 – A'Varius Sparrow – (redshirt) Sophomore (5'10, 190); 22 – Jaiden Credle – Sophomore (6'1, 193); 23 – Jalen Montgomery – (redshirt) Sophomore (5'9, 168); 24 – Frank Peasant – Junior (5'11, 196); 26 – Jayce Gardener – (redshirt) Junior (5'11, 210); 30 – Jordan Brown – (redshirt) Sophomore (5'10, 200); 32 – Jekail Middlebrook - Freshman (5'9, 186); 34 – Romal Webb Jr. – Junior (5'9, 202); 39 – Terry Wilkins – (redshirt) Sophomore (5'8, 187); 45 – Raymond Banner – (redshirt) Sophomore (6'0, 182); Wide receivers: 3 – DJ England-Chisolm – Senior (5'8, 152); 9 – Elijah Metcalf – (redshirt) Sophomore (5'9, 164); 13 – Javonte Sherman – (redshirt) Sophomore (6'2, 189); 15 – Justin Olson – (redshirt) Junior (6'2, 205); 17 – Kalani Norris – (redshirt) Junior (6'0, 162); 18 – Tyson Resper – (redshirt) Freshman (5'8, 165); 25 – Bryce Bailey – (redshirt) Sophomore (5'10, 168); 47 – Jamison Greenway – (redshirt) Junior (5'9, 172); 78 – Trevon Ferrell – (redshirt) Freshman (5'10, 170); 80 – AJ Toney – Senior (5'6, 177); 81 – Mitchell Howell – (redshirt) Sophomore (5'10, 196); 83 – Holden Willis – Junior (6'4, 211); 84 – Ethan Crite – Freshman (6'2, 177); 85 – Jaylen Ward – (redshirt) Freshman (6'1, 202); 86 – Cam'ron Lacy – Freshman (5'8, 154); 87 – Braxton Crouse – (redshirt) Junior (6'1, 177); 87 – Kellen Stewart – (redshirt) Sophomore (5'9, 152); 89 – Elijah Ealey – (redshirt) Sophomore (5'11, 170); Tight ends: 6 – Jeremy Tate Jr – (redshirt) Senior (6'5, 259); 48 – Caden Williams – (redshirt) Sophomore (6'0, 235); 82 – Taharin Sudderth – (redshirt) Sophomore (6'2, 230); 88 – Jacob Coleman – (redshirt) Sophomore (6'3, 228)	Offensive Lineman: 53 – Trenton Taylor-Ricker – (redshirt) Freshman (6'4, 265); 54 – Aaron Wood – Freshman (6'5, 271); 55 – Mateo Guevara – (redshirt) Freshman (6'4, 302); 56 – Devin Hayes – (redshirt) Senior (6'6, 284); 61 – J'Shun Bodiford – (redshirt) Junior (6'3, 283); 62 – Simon Wilson – (redshirt) Sophomore (6'1, 316); 63 – Wilson Kelly – (redshirt) Sophomore (6'2, 300); 64 – Jacqui Graham – (redshirt) Senior (6'4, 263); 65 – Julius Pierce – (redshirt) Junior (6'4, 288); 66 – Daniel Gonzalez – Sophomore (6'5, 291); 67 – Cooper Koch – (redshirt) Freshman (6'3, 299); 70 – Isaac Rue – Freshman (6'6, 303); 71 – Luke Marek – Freshman (6'1, 295); 72 – Morgan Scott – (redshirt) Sophomore (6'5, 309); 73 – Connor Farris – Freshman (6'4, 315); 74 – Ethan Ellis – Senior (6'6, 295); 75 – Jamari Williams – (redshirt) Junior (6'3 317); 76 – Ryan Hunt – Freshman (6'1, 280); 77 – Keylan Rutledge – Sophomore (6'4, 308); 79 – Sterling Porcher – Junior (6'4, 304); Defensive Line: 0 – Richard Kinley – (redshirt) Junior (6'3, 235); 2 – Jorden Starling – (redshirt) Senior (6'5, 272); 5 – Jordan Branch – (redshirt) Senior (6'0, 290); 7 – Zaylin Wood – (redshirt) Junior (6'2, 273); 38 – Zabrien Harden – (redshirt) Sophomore (6'3, 246); 40 – Anthony Bynum – Freshman (6'3, 258); 49 – James Stewart – (redshirt) Sophomore (6'3, 248); 57 – Marley Cook – (redshirt) Junior (6'2, 298); 89 – Brandon Buckner – (redshirt) Sophomore (6'0, 241); 90 – Chayce Smith – Freshman (6'2, 267); 91 – Javon Nelson – (redshirt) Sophomore (6'4, 300); 92 – Damonte Smith – (redshirt) Sophomore (6'3, 284); 93 – Vincent Dinkins – (redshirt) Sophomore (6'1, 286); 94 – Ralph Mency – Junior (6'2, 246); 95 – Tyrece Edwards – (redshirt) Sophomore (6'2, 274); 96 – Kasey Bonds – (redshirt) Freshman (5'8, 263); 97 – Quindarius Dunnigan – (redshirt) Junior (6'4, 256); 98 – Shakai Woods – Freshman (6'1, 270); 99 – Ja'Darious Morris – Freshman (6'1, 250)	Linebackers: 4 – Johnathan Butler – (redshirt) Senior (6'1, 223); 8 – Devyn Curtis – (redshirt) Sophomore (6'2, 235); 10 – Drew Francis – Junior (6'3, 222); 12 – Jalen Davis – (redshirt) Junior (5'11, 200); 18 – James Douglas – (redshirt) Sophomore (6'1, 204); 21 – Parker Hughes – (redshirt) Sophomore (6'2, 210); 32 – Slade Alexander – (redshirt) Sophomore (6'2, 220); 33 – Sam Brumfield – Junior (5'11, 226); 36 – Jordan Thompson – Freshman (5'11, 209); 41 – Raquon Hartley – (redshirt) Junior (6'1, 192); 42 – Da'Shawn Elder – (redshirt) Sophomore (6'0, 218); 43 – Markel James – Freshman (6'2, 217); 44 – Jalen Rayam – (redshirt) Senior (6'1, 219); 50 – Timar Rogers – (redshirt) Sophomore (6'2, 214); 51 – Nash Stidham – (redshirt) Freshman (5'10, 207); 52 – Muaaz Byard – (redshirt) Freshman (6'1, 238); 58 – Dylan Kling – (redshirt) Freshman (6'0, 200); 59 – Jacob Jackson – (redshirt) Junior (5'11, 203); Defensive backs: 1 – Teldrick Ross – (redshirt) Senior (5'11, 194); 17 – Tra Fluellen – Senior (6'2, 210); 22 – Chris Johnson – (redshirt) Sophomore (5'10, 183); 23 – Jalen Jackson – (redshirt) Junior (6'2, 177); 25 – Tylus Hancock – Senior (6'2, 203); 26 – Emmanuel Mann – Junior (6'0, 179); 27 – Rickey Smith – (redshirt) Sophomore (6'0, 170); 28 – De'Arre McDonald – (redshirt) Sophomore (6'0, 208); 29 – Tyrell Raby – (redshirt) Sophomore (5'11, 173); 30 – Jakobe Thomas – (redshirt) Sophomore (6'2, 190); 31 – Deonte Stanley – (redshirt) Junior (6'3, 194); 35 – James Jackson III – Freshman (6'0, 161); 37 – James Shellman IV – Junior (6'0, 190); 46 – Marvae Myers – (redshirt) Junior (6'0, 188); Kicker/Punter: 7 – Zeke Rankin – Junior (5'8, 200) (K); 24 – Scott Payne – (redshirt) Junior (5'10, 177) (K); 36 – Justus Chadwick – (redshirt) Freshman (6'0, 191) (K); 38 – Miles Tillman – (redshirt) Sophomore (5'11, 207) (P); 99 – Trey Turk – Junior (6'1, 204) (P); Long snappers: 54 – Connor Dougherty – (redshirt) Freshman (6'3, 257); 69 – Brody Butler – Junior (5'11, 220); Legend: (C) Team captain; (S) Suspended; (I) Ineligible; Injured; Redshirt
Source and player details, 2023 Middle Tennessee Blue Raiders Football Commits (08/07/2023):
