= 2024 Fiesta Bowl (January) =

Postseason college football bowl game

2024 Vrbo Fiesta Bowl
- CFP New Year’s Six; 53rd Fiesta Bowl
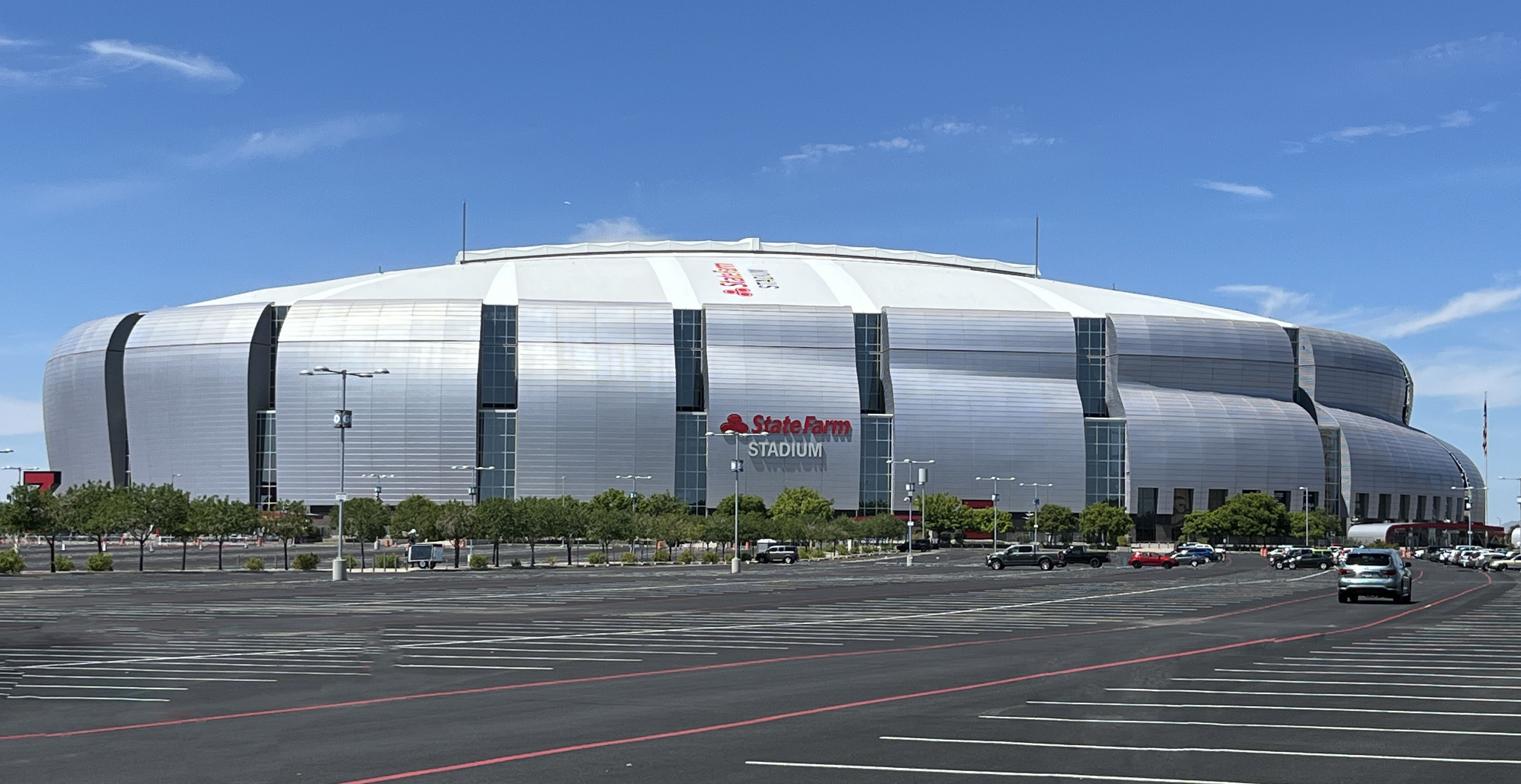
- State Farm Stadium in Glendale, Arizona, hosted the Fiesta Bowl.
Liberty Flames	Oregon Ducks
(13–0)	(11–2)
Conference USA	Pac-12
6	45
Head coach: Jamey Chadwell	Head coach: Dan Lanning
AP / Coaches / CFP; 18 / 20 / 23	AP / Coaches / CFP; 8 / 8 / 8
	1	2	3	4	Total
Liberty	6	0	0	0	6
Oregon	3	28	7	7	45
- Date: January 1, 2024
- Season: 2023
- Stadium: State Farm Stadium
- Location: Glendale, Arizona
- MVP: Off.:Bo Nix (QB, Oregon); Def.:Jeffrey Bassa (LB, Oregon)
- Favorite: Oregon by 16.5
- Referee: Steve Marlowe (SEC)
- Attendance: 47,769

United States TV coverage
- Network: ESPN; ESPN Radio
- Announcers: Bob Wischusen (play-by-play), Robert Griffin III (analyst), and Kris Budden (sideline) (ESPN); Mike Couzens (play-by-play), Max Starks (analyst), and Stormy Buonantony (sideline) (ESPN Radio)

The 2024 Fiesta Bowl was a college football bowl game played on January 1, 2024, at State Farm Stadium in Glendale, Arizona. The 53rd annual Fiesta Bowl featured Liberty of Conference USA (C-USA) and Oregon of the Pac-12 Conference—teams selected at-large by the College Football Playoff selection committee. The game began at approximately 11:00 a.m. MST and was aired on ESPN. The Fiesta Bowl was one of the 2023–24 bowl games concluding the 2023 FBS football season. The game was sponsored by vacation rental marketplace Vrbo and was officially known as the Vrbo Fiesta Bowl. Oregon defeated Liberty, 45–6, to claim their second consecutive bowl victory.

== Teams ==
The teams for the Fiesta Bowl, one of the New Year's Six bowl games, were selected at-large by the College Football Playoff (CFP) selection committee.

This was the first meeting between Oregon and Liberty.

=== Liberty ===
The Flames entered the bowl undefeated, with a 13–0 record, ranked 23rd in the CFP rankings and 18th in the AP poll. They beat New Mexico State in the 2023 Conference USA Football Championship Game, 49–35.

This was Liberty's first Fiesta Bowl. It was also the first appearance by a C-USA team in a New Year's Six bowl game.

=== Oregon ===
The Ducks entered the bowl 11–2 and ranked 8th each of the major polls. Both of their losses were to Washington; once during the regular season and again in the 2023 Pac-12 Football Championship Game.

This was Oregon's fourth Fiesta Bowl; entering the game, they were 2–1 in prior appearances, most recently playing in the January 2021 edition, which they lost. It was also Oregon's final game as a member of the Pac-12 Conference, with the Ducks set to join the Big Ten Conference beginning in 2024.

== Game summary ==
2024 Vrbo Fiesta Bowl

Quarter	1	2	3	4	Total
No. 23 Liberty	6	0	0	0	6
No. 8 Oregon	3	28	7	7	45

at State Farm Stadium • Glendale, Arizona

- Date: Monday, January 1, 2024
- Game time: 11:00 a.m. MST
- Game weather: N/A (indoor stadium)
- Game attendance: 47,769
- Referee: Steve Marlowe
- TV announcers (ESPN): Bob Wischusen (play-by-play), Robert Griffin III (analyst), and Kris Budden (sideline)
- Box score

Scoring summary

Quarter	Time	Drive			Team	Scoring information	Score	
Quarter	Time	Plays	Yards	TOP	Team	Scoring information	LIB	ORE
1	12:37	6	75	2:23	LIB	Bentley Hanshaw 17-yard touchdown reception from Kaidon Salter, Nick Brown kick failed	6	0
1	9:06	8	60	3:31	ORE	37-yard field goal by Camden Lewis	6	3
2	12:53	7	82	3:24	ORE	Gary Bryant Jr. 2-yard touchdown reception from Bo Nix, Camden Lewis kick good	6	10
2	7:13	10	75	3:59	ORE	Terrance Ferguson 2-yard touchdown reception from Bo Nix, Camden Lewis kick good	6	17
2	3:50	5	95	2:16	ORE	Kenyon Sadiq 2-yard touchdown reception from Bo Nix, Camden Lewis kick good	6	24
2	0:03	5	68	1:09	ORE	Traeshon Holden 17-yard touchdown reception from Bo Nix, Camden Lewis kick good	6	31
3	11:11	7	75	3:49	ORE	Tez Johnson 24-yard touchdown reception from Bo Nix, Camden Lewis kick good	6	38
4	14:13	13	82	7:27	ORE	Bucky Irving 1-yard touchdown run, Grant Meadors kick good	6	45
"TOP" = time of possession. For other American football terms, see Glossary of American football.							6	45

=== Statistics ===
Statistics	LIB	ORE
First downs	15	28
Plays–yards	52–294	71–584
Rushes–yards	28–168	29–183
Passing yards	126	401
Passing: comp–att–int	15–24–2	33–42–0
Time of possession	24:45	35:15

Team	Category	Player	Statistics
Liberty	Passing	Kaidon Salter	15/24, 126 yards, TD, INT
Liberty	Rushing	Quinton Cooley	8 carries, 79 yards
Liberty	Receiving	CJ Daniels	8 catches, 79 yards
Oregon	Passing	Bo Nix	28/35, 363 yards, 5 TD
Oregon	Rushing	Bucky Irving	14 carries, 117 yards, TD
Oregon	Receiving	Tez Johnson	11 catches, 172 yards, TD
