= 2023 Jacksonville State Gamecocks football team =

American college football season

2023 Jacksonville State Gamecocks football

New Orleans Bowl champion

New Orleans Bowl, W 34–31 ^{OT} vs. Louisiana
- Conference: Conference USA
- Record: 9–4 (6–2 C-USA)
- Head coach: Rich Rodriguez (2nd season)
- Offensive coordinator: Rod Smith (2nd season)
- Offensive scheme: Spread option
- Defensive coordinator: Zac Alley (2nd season)
- Base defense: Multiple 4–2–5
- Home stadium: Burgess–Snow Field at JSU Stadium

2023 Conference USA football standings
	Conf.			Overall
Team	W		L	W		L
No. 25 Liberty y$	8	–	0	13	–	1
New Mexico State y	7	–	1	10	–	5
Jacksonville State*	6	–	2	9	–	4
Western Kentucky	5	–	3	8	–	5
Middle Tennessee	3	–	5	4	–	8
UTEP	2	–	6	3	–	9
Sam Houston*	2	–	6	3	–	9
Louisiana Tech	2	–	6	3	–	9
FIU	1	–	7	4	–	8
Championship: Liberty 49, New Mexico State 35
$ – Conference champion; y – Championship game participant; * – Ineligible for postseason play due to FCS-to-FBS transition rules; Rankings from AP Poll

The 2023 Jacksonville State Gamecocks football team represented Jacksonville State University as a member of Conference USA (C-USA) during the 2023 NCAA Division I FBS football season. The Gamecocks were led by second-year head coach Rich Rodriguez and played home games at the Burgess–Snow Field at JSU Stadium in Jacksonville, Alabama as first-year members of Conference USA. The Jacksonville State Gamecocks football team drew an average home attendance of 20,033 in 2023.

Due to the lack of bowl-eligible teams, and despite a two-year transition period to FBS with a ban from postseason play, the Gamecocks received a bid to the New Orleans Bowl, where they defeated Louisiana 34–31 in overtime.

== Offseason ==
=== Transfers ===
==== Outgoing ====
Player	Position	Destination
DJ Coleman	DL	Unknown
Amon Scarbrough	S	Alabama State
Brevyn Jones	OT	West Georgia
Osiris Smith	LB	Grambling State
TJ Lockley	WR	Unknown
Aaron McLaughlin	QB	Unknown
Kraeton Muenchau	IOL	Unknown
Patrick Jackson	RB	Unknown
Charles Padgett	OT	Unknown
Ahmad Edwards	WR	Ball State

==== Incoming ====
Player	Position	Previous school
Logan Smothers	QB	Nebraska
Travis Collier	CB	Western Kentucky
Dallan Wright	WR	Virginia Tech
Quae Drake	EDGE	ULM
Austin Ambush	S	Maine
Jamarye Joiner	WR	Arizona
J'Wan Evans	RB	San Manteo
Malik Jackson	RB	ULM

== Preseason ==
=== Conference USA media poll ===
Conference USA media poll
Predicted finish	Team	Votes (1st place)
1	Western Kentucky	(18)
2	Liberty	(4)
3	Middle Tennessee	
4	Louisiana Tech	
5	New Mexico State	
6	UTEP	
7	Jacksonville State	
T8	FIU	
T8	Sam Houston	

== Schedule ==
Jacksonville State and Conference USA announced the 2023 football schedule on January 10, 2023.

Date	Time	Opponent	Site	TV	Result	Attendance
August 26	4:30 p.m.	UTEP	Burgess–Snow Field at JSU Stadium; Jacksonville, AL	CBSSN	W 17–14	17,982
September 2	1:00 p.m.	East Tennessee State*	Burgess–Snow Field at JSU Stadium; Jacksonville, AL	ESPN+	W 49–3	21,276
September 9	6:00 p.m.	at Coastal Carolina*	Brooks Stadium; Conway, SC	ESPN+	L 16–30	16,006
September 23	4:00 p.m.	Eastern Michigan*^{†}	Burgess–Snow Field at JSU Stadium; Jacksonville, AL	ESPN+	W 21–0	20,966
September 28	7:00 p.m.	at Sam Houston	Bowers Stadium; Huntsville, TX	ESPNU	W 35–28 ^{OT}	14,566
October 4	7:00 p.m.	at Middle Tennessee	Johnny "Red" Floyd Stadium; Murfreesboro, TN	ESPNU	W 45–30	13,066
October 10	7:30 p.m.	Liberty	Burgess–Snow Field at JSU Stadium; Jacksonville, AL	ESPNU	L 13–31	21,745
October 17	6:30 p.m.	Western Kentucky	Burgess–Snow Field at JSU Stadium; Jacksonville, AL	ESPNU	W 20–17	17,977
October 25	6:00 p.m.	at FIU	Riccardo Silva Stadium; Westchester, FL	CBSSN	W 41–16	14,074
November 4	11:00 a.m.	at South Carolina*	Williams–Brice Stadium; Columbia, SC	ESPNU	L 28–38	75,348
November 18	1:00 p.m.	Louisiana Tech	Burgess–Snow Field at JSU Stadium; Jacksonville, AL	ESPN+	W 56–17	20,252
November 25	3:00 p.m.	at New Mexico State	Aggie Memorial Stadium; Las Cruces, NM	ESPN+	L 17–20	15,702
December 16	1:15 p.m.	vs. Louisiana*	Caesars Superdome; New Orleans, LA (New Orleans Bowl)	ESPN	W 34–31 ^{OT}	14,485
*Non-conference game; ^{†}Homecoming; All times are in Central time

== Game summaries ==
=== vs UTEP ===
UTEP Miners (0-0) vs Jacksonville State Gamecocks (0-0)

Team	1	2	3	4	Total
Miners	0	7	0	7	14
• Gamecocks	3	7	7	0	17

- Date: August 26
- Location: Burgess-Snow Field at JSU Stadium
  Jacksonville, Alabama
- Game start: 4:30 p.m. CST/2:30 p.m. PST
- Elapsed time: 3 hours and 15 minutes
- Game attendance: 17,982
- Game weather: Sunny, 97 °F (36 °C)
- Referee: Ron Hudson
- TV announcers (CBSSN): Rich Waltz (play-by-play), Aaron Taylor (analyst), Amanda Guerra (sideline)

Scoring summary
1st	4:57	JSU	Alen Karajic 41-yard field goal	JSU 3–0
2nd	13:26	JSU	Ron Wiggins 4-yard run (Alen Karajic kick)	JSU 10–0
2nd	0:00	UTEP	Deion Hankins 1-yard run (Buzz Flabiano kick)	JSU 10–7
3rd	7:47	JSU	Malik Jackson 7-yard run (Alen Karajic kick)	JSU 17–7
4th	12:19	UTEP	Kelly Akharaiyi 32-yard pass from Gavin Hardison (Buzz Flabiano kick)	JSU 17–14

Statistics	UTEP	Jacksonville State
First downs	22	15
Plays–yards	72–364	62–277
Rushes–yards	156	210
Passing yards	208	67
Passing: comp–att–int	17–29–2	10–20–0
Time of possession	34:38	25:22

Team	Category	Player	Statistics
UTEP	Passing	Gavin Hardison	17/29, 208 yards, 1 TD, 2 INT
UTEP	Rushing	Torrance Burgess Jr.	12 carries, 58 yards
UTEP	Receiving	Kelly Akharaiyi	4 receptions, 102 yards, 1 TD
Jacksonville State	Passing	Zion Webb	10/20, 67 yards
Jacksonville State	Rushing	Malik Jackson	13 carries, 76 yards, 1 TD
Jacksonville State	Receiving	Ron Wiggins	2 receptions, 24 yards

=== vs East Tennessee State ===
East Tennessee State Buccaneers (FCS) (0-0) vs Jacksonville State Gamecocks (1-0)

Team	1	2	3	4	Total
Buccaneers (FCS)	3	0	0	0	3
• Gamecocks	14	7	21	7	49

- Date: September 2
- Location: Burgess-Snow Field at JSU Stadium
  Jacksonville, Alabama
- Game start: 1:00 p.m. CST/11:00 a.m. PST
- TV announcers (ESPN+): TBD

Scoring summary

Statistics	East Tennessee State	Jacksonville State
First downs		
Plays–yards		
Rushes–yards		
Passing yards		
Passing: comp–att–int		
Time of possession		

Team	Category	Player	Statistics
East Tennessee State	Passing		
East Tennessee State	Rushing		
East Tennessee State	Receiving		
Jacksonville State	Passing		
Jacksonville State	Rushing		
Jacksonville State	Receiving		

=== at Coastal Carolina ===
Jacksonville State Gamecocks (2-0) vs Coastal Carolina Chanticleers (0-1)

Team	1	2	3	4	Total
Gamecocks	6	3	0	7	16
• Chanticleers	7	3	13	7	30

- Date: September 9
- Location: Brooks Stadium
  Conway, South Carolina
- Game start: 6:00 p.m. CST/4:00 p.m. PST
- TV announcers (ESPN+): TBD

Scoring summary

Statistics	Jacksonville State	Coastal Carolina
First downs		
Plays–yards		
Rushes–yards		
Passing yards		
Passing: comp–att–int		
Time of possession		

Team	Category	Player	Statistics
Jacksonville State	Passing		
Jacksonville State	Rushing		
Jacksonville State	Receiving		
Coastal Carolina	Passing		
Coastal Carolina	Rushing		
Coastal Carolina	Receiving		

=== vs Eastern Michigan ===
Eastern Michigan Eagles (2-1) vs Jacksonville State Gamecocks (2-1)

Team	1	2	3	4	Total
Eagles	0	0	0	0	0
• Gamecocks	7	7	7	0	21

- Date: September 23
- Location: Burgess-Snow Field at JSU Stadium
  Jacksonville, Alabama
- Game start: 4:00 p.m. CST/2:00 p.m. PST
- TV announcers (ESPN Networks): TBD

Scoring summary

Statistics	Eastern Michigan	Jacksonville State
First downs		
Plays–yards		
Rushes–yards		
Passing yards		
Passing: comp–att–int		
Time of possession		

Team	Category	Player	Statistics
Eastern Michigan	Passing		
Eastern Michigan	Rushing		
Eastern Michigan	Receiving		
Jacksonville State	Passing		
Jacksonville State	Rushing		
Jacksonville State	Receiving		

=== at Sam Houston ===
Jacksonville State Gamecocks (3-1) vs Sam Houston Bearkats (0-3)

Team	1	2	3	4	Total
Gamecocks	7	0	7	14	28
Bearkats	14	7	0	7	28

- Date: September 28
- Location: Bowers Stadium
  Huntsville, Texas
- Game start: 7:00 p.m. CST/5:00 p.m. PST
- Elapsed time: 3 hours and 36 minutes
- Game attendance: 14,566
- Game weather: Sunny, 90 °F (32 °C)
- Referee: John Lehring
- TV announcers (ESPNU): Matt Barrie (play-by-play), Louis Riddick (Analyst), and Harry Lyles Jr. (sideline reporter)

Scoring summary
1st	9:47	JSU	Malik Jackson 26-yard run (Alen Karajic kick) (4 plays, 86 yards, 0:51)	JSU 7–0
1st	8:10	SAM	John Gentry 56-yard pass (Colby Sessums kick) (4 plays, 75 yards, 1:37)	TIE 7–7
1st	1:37	SAM	Noah Smith 22-yard pass (Keegan Shoemaker kick) (3 plays, 38 yards, 1:02)	SAM 14–7
2nd	10:20	SAM	Trapper Pannell 3-yard run (Colby Sessums kick) (11 plays, 89 yards, 5:02)	SAM 21–7
3rd	8:32	JSU	Michael Pettway 31-yard pass from Logan Smothers (Alen Karajic kick) (5 plays, 60 yards, 1:46)	SAM 21–14
4th	8:44	JSU	Logan Smothers 16-yard run (3 plays, 31 yards, 0:57)	SAM 21–20
4th	1:11	SAM	Trapper Pannell 1-yard run (Colby Sessums kick) (7 plays, 20 yards, 3:00)	SAM 28–20
4th	0:13	SAM	Perry Carter 28-yard pass from Logan Smothers (Quinton Lane kick) (8 plays, 75 yards, 0:58)	TIE 28–28
OT	0:00	JSU	Sean Brown 24-yard pass from Logan Smothers (Alen Karajic kick) (2 plays, 25 yards, 0:00)	JSU 35–28

Statistics	Jacksonville State	Sam Houston State
First downs	20	25
Plays–yards	393	435
Rushes–yards	196	136
Passing yards	197	299
Passing: comp–att–int	16–33–1	23–39–1
Time of possession	17:36	42:24

Team	Category	Player	Statistics
Jacksonville State	Passing	Logan Smothers	16/28, 197 yards, 3 TD
Jacksonville State	Rushing	Malik Jackson	13 rushes, 129 yards, TD
Jacksonville State	Receiving	Michael Pettway	3 receptions, 74 yards, TD
Sam Houston State	Passing	Keegan Shoemaker	22/38, 285 yards, 2 TD, 2 INT
Sam Houston State	Rushing	John Gentry	30 rushes, 97 yards
Sam Houston State	Receiving	Noah Smith	10 receptions, 97 yards, TD

=== at Middle Tennessee ===
Jacksonville State Gamecocks (4-1) vs Middle Tennessee Blue Raiders (1-4)

Team	1	2	3	4	Total
Gamecocks	0	0	0	0	0
Blue Raiders	0	0	0	0	0

- Date: October 4
- Location: Johnny "Red" Floyd Stadium
  Murfreesboro, Tennessee
- Game start: 7:00 p.m. CST/4:00 p.m. PST
- Game attendance: 13,066
- TV announcers (ESPNU): TBD

Scoring summary

Statistics	Jacksonville State	Middle Tennessee
First downs		
Plays–yards		
Rushes–yards		
Passing yards		
Passing: comp–att–int		
Time of possession		

Team	Category	Player	Statistics
Jacksonville State	Passing		
Jacksonville State	Rushing		
Jacksonville State	Receiving		
Middle Tennessee	Passing		
Middle Tennessee	Rushing		
Middle Tennessee	Receiving		

=== vs Liberty ===
Liberty Flames (5-0) vs Jacksonville State Gamecocks (5-1)

Team	1	2	3	4	Total
Flames	0	0	0	0	0
Gamecocks	0	0	0	0	0

- Date: October 10
- Location: Burgess-Snow Field at JSU Stadium
  Jacksonville, Alabama
- Game start: 7:30 p.m. CST/5:30 p.m. PST
- Game attendance: 21,745
- TV announcers (ESPNU): TBD

Scoring summary

Statistics	Liberty	Jacksonville State
First downs		
Plays–yards		
Rushes–yards		
Passing yards		
Passing: comp–att–int		
Time of possession		

Team	Category	Player	Statistics
Liberty	Passing		
Liberty	Rushing		
Liberty	Receiving		
Jacksonville State	Passing		
Jacksonville State	Rushing		
Jacksonville State	Receiving		

=== vs Western Kentucky ===
Game Eight – Western Kentucky Hilltoppers (4-2) at Jacksonville State Gamecocks (5-2) – Game summary

Quarter	1	2	3	4	Total
Western Kentucky	10	7	0	0	17
Jacksonville State	0	10	0	10	20

at Burgess-Snow Field at JSU Stadium • Jacksonville, Alabama

- Date: Tuesday, October 17, 2023
- Game time: 6:30 p.m. CST
- Game weather: Clear, 56 °F (13 °C)
- Game attendance: 17,977
- Referee: Ed Ardito
- TV announcers (ESPNU): Dave Neal (play-by-play) and Derek Mason (analyst)

Game information

First quarter

- (8:52) WKU – Dalvin Smith 10-yard pass from Austin Reed (Lucas Carneiro kick) (Drive: 8 plays, 53 yards, 2:20; Western Kentucky 7-0)
- (1:55) WKU – Lucas Carneiro 28-yard field goal (Drive: 13 plays, 79 yards, 5:01; Western Kentucky 10-0)

Second quarter

- (12:45) JVST – Zion Webb 10-yard run (Alen Karajic kick) (Drive: 11 plays, 75 yards, 4:14; Western Kentucky 10-7)
- (8:36) WKU – River Helms 3-yard pass from Austin Reed (Lucas Carneiro kick) (Drive: 5 plays, 40 yards, 2:09; Western Kentucky 17-7)
- (5:35) JVST – Alen Karajic 23-yard field goal (Drive: 10 plays, 70 yards, 3:01; Western Kentucky 17-10)

Third quarter

- No scoring plays.

Fourth quarter

- (4:40) JVST – Anwar Lewis 26-yard run (Alen Karajic kick) (Drive: 11 plays, 91 yards, 3:39; Tied 17-17)
- (0:00) JVST – Alen Karajic 41-yard field goal (Drive: 10 plays, 45 yards, 2:32; Jacksonville State 20-17)

Statistics	WKU	JVST
First downs	16	27
Total yards	72–339	95–484
Rushing yards	24–89	55–262
Passing yards	250	222
Passing: Comp–Att–Int	24–48–1	23–40–1
Time of possession	26:56	33:04

Team	Category	Player	Statistics
Western Kentucky	Passing	Austin Reed	24/48, 250 yards, 2 TD, INT
Western Kentucky	Rushing	Elijah Young	10 carries, 39 yards
Western Kentucky	Receiving	K.D. Hutchinson	4 receptions, 52 yards
Jacksonville State	Passing	Zion Webb	22/39, 218 yards, INT
Jacksonville State	Rushing	Zion Webb	28 carries, 146 yards, TD
Jacksonville State	Receiving	P.J. Wells	5 receptions, 53 yards

=== at FIU ===
Jacksonville State Gamecocks (6-2) vs FIU Panthers (4-4)

Team	1	2	3	4	Total
Gamecocks	0	0	0	0	0
Panthers	0	0	0	0	0

- Date: October 25
- Location: Riccardo Silva Stadium
  Westchester, Florida
- Game start: 6:00 p.m. CST/4:00 p.m. PST
- Game attendance: 14,074
- TV announcers (CBSSN): TBD

Scoring summary

Statistics	Jacksonville State	Florida International
First downs		
Plays–yards		
Rushes–yards		
Passing yards		
Passing: comp–att–int		
Time of possession		

Team	Category	Player	Statistics
Jacksonville State	Passing		
Jacksonville State	Rushing		
Jacksonville State	Receiving		
Florida International	Passing		
Florida International	Rushing		
Florida International	Receiving		

=== at South Carolina ===
Game Ten – Jacksonville State Gamecocks at South Carolina Gamecocks – Game summary

Quarter	1	2	3	4	Total
Jacksonville State	7	7	14	0	28
South Carolina	14	7	7	10	38

at Williams-Brice Stadium • Columbia, South Carolina

- Date: Saturday, November 4, 2023
- Game time: 11:00 a.m. CST
- Game weather: Clear • 61 °F (16 °C) • Wind: N 3.6 MPH
- Game attendance: 75,348
- Referee: Jason Autrey
- TV announcers (ESPNU): Brian Custer (play-by-play), Rod Gilmore (analyst), Lauren Sisler (sideline)

Game information

First quarter

- (11:07) SC – Tonka Hemingway 2-yard Run (Mitch Jeter Kick) (Drive: 5 plays, 62 yards, 2:38; South Carolina 7–0)
- (3:44) JVST – Sean Brown 15-yard pass from Zion Webb (Alen Karajic Kick) (Drive: 8 plays, 62 yards, 2:36; Tied 7–7)
- (2:03) SC – Spencer Rattler 1-yard Run (Mitch Jeter Kick) (Drive: 5 plays, 70 yards, 1:41; South Carolina 14–7)

Second quarter

- (14:16) JVST – Anwar Lewis 4-yard Run (Alen Karajic Kick) (Drive: 9 plays, 75 yards, 2:47; Tied 14–14)
- (0:23) SC – Xavier Legette 5-yard pass from Spencer Rattler (Mitch Jeter Kick) (Drive: 4 plays, 49 yards, 0:30; South Carolina 21–14)

Third quarter

- (11:50) JVST – Sean Brown 13-yard pass from Logan Smothers (Alen Karajic Kick) (Drive: 8 plays, 73 yards, 3:02; Tied 21–21)
- (5:30) JVST – Perry Carter 54-yard pass from Zion Webb (Alen Karajic Kick) (Drive: 3 plays, 62 yards, 1:16; Jacksonville State 28–21)
- (1:29) SC – Xavier Legette 65-yard pass from Spencer Rattler (Mitch Jeter Kick) (Drive: 1 play, 65 yards, 0:11; Tied 28–28)

Fourth quarter

- (5:51) SC – Mitch Jeter 26-yard Field Goal (Drive: 10 plays, 48 yards, 3:58; South Carolina 31–28)
- (2:02) SC – Stone Blanton 88-yard Interception Return (Mitch Jeter Kick) (Drive: 11 play, 58 yards, 3:49; South Carolina 38–28)

Statistics	JVST	SC
First downs	23	20
Total yards	84–421	77–488
Rushing yards	57–225	38–89
Passing yards	196	399
Passing: Comp–Att–Int	13–27–2	27–39–1
Time of possession	27:07	32:53

Team	Category	Player	Statistics
Jacksonville State	Passing	Zion Webb	12/23, 183 yards, 2 TD, INT
Jacksonville State	Rushing	Ron Wiggins	17 carries, 88 yards
Jacksonville State	Receiving	Perry Carter	5 receptions, 106 yards, TD
South Carolina	Passing	Spencer Rattler	27/38, 399 yards, 2 TD, INT
South Carolina	Rushing	Mario Anderson	16 carries, 75 yards
South Carolina	Receiving	Xavier Legette	9 receptions, 217 yards, 2 TD

=== vs Louisiana Tech ===
Louisiana Tech Bulldogs (0-0) vs Jacksonville State Gamecocks (0-0)

Team	1	2	3	4	Total
Bulldogs	0	0	0	0	0
Gamecocks	0	0	0	0	0

- Date: November 18
- Location: Burgess-Snow Field at JSU Stadium
  Jacksonville, Alabama
- Game start: 1:00 p.m. CST/11:00 a.m. PST
- TV announcers (ESPN Networks): TBD

Scoring summary

Statistics	Louisiana Tech	Jacksonville State
First downs		
Plays–yards		
Rushes–yards		
Passing yards		
Passing: comp–att–int		
Time of possession		

Team	Category	Player	Statistics
Louisiana Tech	Passing		
Louisiana Tech	Rushing		
Louisiana Tech	Receiving		
Jacksonville State	Passing		
Jacksonville State	Rushing		
Jacksonville State	Receiving		

=== at New Mexico State ===
Jacksonville State Gamecocks (8–3) vs New Mexico State Aggies (9–3)

Team	1	2	3	4	Total
Gamecocks	0	3	0	14	17
• Aggies	14	3	0	3	20

- Date: November 25
- Location: Aggie Memorial Stadium
  Las Cruces, New Mexico
- Game start: 3:00 p.m. CST/1:00 p.m. PST
- Game attendance: 15,702
- Game weather: Cloudy, 61 °F (16 °C)
- Referee: Garrett Dickerson
- TV announcers (ESPN+): Adam Young, Danny Knee, and Tatiana Favela

Scoring summary
1st	8:12	NMSU	Jamoni Jones 1-yard run (Ethan Albertson kick) (13 plays, 65 yards, 6:48)	NMSU 7–0
1st	2:28	NMSU	Trent Hudson 11-yard pass from Diego Pavia (Ethan Albertson kick) (8 plays, 83 yards, 4:15)	NMSU 14–0
2nd	7:09	JSU	Alen Karajic 33-yard field goal (5 plays, 41 yards, 1:21)	NMSU 14–3
2nd	0:00	NMSU	Ethan Albertson 27-yard field goal (15 plays, 70 yards, 3:31)	NMSU 17–3
4	14:52	JSU	Alen Karajic 27-yard field goal (4 plays, -1 yard, 1:07)	NMSU 17–6
4	6:23	JSU	Malik Jackson 11-yard run (Zion Webb run) (4 plays, 22 yards, 0:56)	NMSU 17–14
4	0:43	JSU	Alen Karajic 27-yard field goal (12 plays, 52 yards, 2:57)	TIED 17–17
4	0:00	NMSU	Ethan Albertson 52-yard field goal (5 plays, 50 yards, 0:43)	NMSU 20–17

Statistics	Jacksonville State	New Mexico State
First downs	17	27
Plays–yards	58–333	82–455
Rushes–yards	28–85	48–186
Passing yards	248	269
Passing: comp–att–int	17–30–2	23–34–2
Time of possession	20:18	39:42

Team	Category	Player	Statistics
Jacksonville State	Passing	Zion Webb	17/30, 248 yards, 2 INT
Jacksonville State	Rushing	Malik Jackson	8 carries, 43 yards, TD
Jacksonville State	Receiving	Perry Carter	7 receptions, 134 yards
New Mexico State	Passing	Diego Pavia	23/34, 269 yards, TD, 2 INT
New Mexico State	Rushing	Diego Pavia	19 carries, 68 yards
New Mexico State	Receiving	Trent Hudson	5 receptions, 70 yards, TD

=== vs. Louisiana (New Orleans Bowl) ===
Jacksonville State Gamecocks (8–4) vs. Louisiana Ragin' Cajuns (6–6)

Team	1	2	3	4	OT	Total
• Gamecocks	7	7	10	7	3	34
Ragin' Cajuns	7	7	7	10	0	31

- Date: December 16, 2023
- Location: Caesars Superdome
  New Orleans, Louisiana
- Game start: 1:20 p.m. CDT
- Elapsed time: 3 hours and 47 minutes
- Game attendance: 14,486
- Game weather: 74 °F (23 °C) • Weather: Indoor (N/A)
- Referee: Steven Anderson
- TV announcers (ESPN): Anish Shroff (play-by-play), Andre Ware (analyst), and Taylor Davis (sideline reporter)

Scoring summary
1	13:17	LA	Jalen Clark 46-yard fumble returned (Kenneth Almendares kick) (5 plays, 21 yards, 1:43)	LA 7–0
1	03:06	JVST	Cole Fuller 1-yard rush (Garrison Rippa kick) (13 plays, 80 yards, 4:42)	TIE 7–7
2	04:22	LA	Jalen Clark 16-yard interception returned (Kenneth Almendares kick) (3 plays, 6 yards, 0:50)	LA 14–7
2	00:23	JVST	Ron Wiggins 7-yard rush (Garrison Rippa kick) (14 plays, 75 yards, 3:59)	TIE 14–14
3	07:55	JVST	Garrison Rippa 22-yard field goal (16 plays, 72 yards, 5:37)	JVST 17–14
3	05:47	LA	Chandler Fields 1-yard rush (Kenneth Almendares kick) (6 plays, 73 yards, 2:08)	LA 21–17
3	02:53	JVST	Logan Smothers 10-yard rush (Garrison Rippa kick) (8 plays, 75 yards, 2:54)	JVST 24–21
4	14:02	LA	Kenneth Almendares 33-yard field goal (10 plays, 46 yards, 3:51)	TIE 24–24
4	05:32	LA	Tyree Skipper 43-yard interception returned (Kenneth Almendares kick) (6 plays, 8 yards, 1:46)	LA 31–24
4	01:46	JVST	Perry Carter 18-yard pass from Zion Webb (Garrison Rippa kick) (8 plays, 70 yards, 1:51)	TIE 31–31
OT		JVST	Garrison Rippa 27-yard field goal (7 plays, 16 yards)	JVST 34–31

Statistics	Jacksonville State	Louisiana
First downs	31	14
Total yards	526	247
Rushing yards	290	92
Passing yards	236	155
Turnovers	4	0
Time of possession	33:00	27:00

Team	Category	Player	Statistics
Jacksonville State	Passing	Zion Webb	14/26, 156 yards, 1 TD, 2 INTs
Jacksonville State	Rushing	Ron Wiggins	27 carries, 126 yards, 1 TD
Jacksonville State	Receiving	Quinton Lane	7 receptions, 86 yards
Louisiana	Passing	Chandler Fields	13/26, 155 yards
Louisiana	Rushing	Dre'lyn Washington	16 carries, 73 yards
Louisiana	Receiving	Pearse Migl	2 receptions, 34 yards
