= 2023 Conference USA Football Championship Game =

- Conference Championship
| New Mexico State Aggies | Liberty Flames |
| (10–3) | (12–0) |
| 35 | 49 |
| Head coach: Jerry Kill | Head coach: Jamey Chadwell |
| | AP / Coaches / CFP; 20 / 22 / 24 |
| | 1 | 2 | 3 | 4 | Total |
|---|---|---|---|---|---|
| New Mexico State | 7 | 14 | 14 | 0 | 35 |
| Liberty | 7 | 14 | 14 | 14 | 49 |
- Date: December 1, 2023
- Season: 2023
- Stadium: Williams Stadium
- Location: Lynchburg, Virginia
- MVP: Kaidon Salter, QB, Liberty
- Favorite: Liberty by 11
- Referee: Ron Hudson
- Attendance: 20,077

United States TV coverage
- Network: CBSSN
- Announcers: Rich Waltz, Aaron Taylor and Amanda Guerra

2023 Conference USA football standings
| | Conf. | | | Overall |
| Team | W | | L | W | | L |
|---|---|---|---|---|---|---|
| No. 25 Liberty y$ | 8 | – | 0 | 13 | – | 1 |
| New Mexico State y | 7 | – | 1 | 10 | – | 5 |
| Jacksonville State* | 6 | – | 2 | 9 | – | 4 |
| Western Kentucky | 5 | – | 3 | 8 | – | 5 |
| Middle Tennessee | 3 | – | 5 | 4 | – | 8 |
| UTEP | 2 | – | 6 | 3 | – | 9 |
| Sam Houston* | 2 | – | 6 | 3 | – | 9 |
| Louisiana Tech | 2 | – | 6 | 3 | – | 9 |
| FIU | 1 | – | 7 | 4 | – | 8 |
Championship: Liberty 49, New Mexico State 35
$ – Conference champion; y – Championship game participant; * – Ineligible for postseason play due to FCS-to-FBS transition rules; Rankings from AP Poll

The 2023 Conference USA Football Championship Game was a college football game played on December 1, 2023, at Williams Stadium in Lynchburg, Virginia. It was the 19th edition of the Conference USA Football Championship Game and determined the champion of Conference USA (CUSA) for the 2023 season. The game begun at 7:00 pm and aired on CBS Sports Network. The game featured the Liberty Flames, the team with the best conference record, against the New Mexico State Aggies, with the second best conference record. By virtue of having the best record, Liberty hosted the game.

== Teams ==
This season was the first for both Liberty and New Mexico State in Conference USA. Both had been Independents prior to the 2023 season. It is also the first conference championship game appearance for both schools.

=== New Mexico State ===
The Aggies clinched their spot in the Championship game following their defeat of Western Kentucky on November 11. New Mexico State was attempting to win its first conference championship since winning the Missouri Valley Conference in 1978. 2023 was the Aggies' first season as a member of Conference USA, having previously competed as an FBS independent from 2012 to 2022.

=== Liberty ===
The Flames clinched their spot in the championship game following their defeat of Western Kentucky on October 24. Liberty clinched home field in the championship game following its defeat of Louisiana Tech on November 4. Liberty was seeking to win its first conference title since winning the FCS Big South Conference in 2016.

== Scoring summary ==
2023 Conference USA Football Championship Game
New Mexico State Aggies (10–3) vs. No. 24 Liberty Flames (12–0)

| Quarter | 1 | 2 | 3 | 4 | Total |
|---|---|---|---|---|---|
| Aggies | 7 | 14 | 14 | 0 | 35 |
| No. 24 Flames | 7 | 14 | 14 | 14 | 49 |

at Williams Stadium • Lynchburg, Virginia

- Date: December 1, 2023
- Game time: 7:00 p.m. EST
- Game weather: 44 degrees, rain
- Game attendance: 20,007
- Referee: Ron Hudsoon
- TV announcers (CBS Sports Network): Rich Waltz (play-by-play), Aaron Taylor (color), and Amanda Guerra (sideline)

Game information

First Quarter

- (10:08) NMSU – Diego Pavia 25 yard rush, Ethan Albertson kick (Drive: 8 plays, 75 yards, 4:52; New Mexico State 7–0)
- (6:09) LIB – Quinton Cooley 1 yard rush, Nick Brown kick (Drive: 9 plays, 80 yards, 3:52; Tied 7–7)

Second Quarter

- (14:55) NMSU – Ron Tiavaasue 10 yard pass from Diego Pavia, Ethan Albertson kick (Drive: 11 plays, 75 yards, 6:14; New Mexico State 14–7)
- (5:38) LIB – Quinton Cooley 12 yard rush, Nick Brown kick (Drive: 5 plays, 55 yards, 2:17; Tied 14–14)
- (0:27) LIB – Noah Frith 26 yard pass from Kaidon Salter, Nick Brown kick (Drive: 8 plays, 89 yards, 1:24; Liberty 21–14)
- (0:03) NMSU – Trent Hudson 17 yard pass from Diego Pavia, Ethan Albertson kick (Drive: 4 plays, 58 yards, 0:22; Tied 21–21)

Third Quarter

- (13:15) LIB – Quinton Cooley 4 yard rush, Nick Brown kick (Drive: 5 plays, 71 yards, 1:40; Liberty 28–21)
- (9:19) LIB – CJ Daniels 20 yard pass from Kaidon Salter, Nick Brown kick (Drive: 5 plays, 64 yards, 2:30; Liberty 35–21)
- (9:07) NMSU – Jonathan Brady 75 yard pass from Diego Pavia, Ethan Albertson kick (Drive: 1 plays, 75 yards, 0:12; Liberty 35–28)
- (2:57) NMSU – Trent Hudson 11 yard pass from Blaze Berlowitz, Ethan Albertson kick (Drive: 6 plays, 80 yards, 2:24; Tied 35–35)

Fourth Quarter

- (13:51) LIB – Billy Lucas 2 yard rush, Nick Brown kick (Drive: 9 plays, 80 yards, 4:00; Liberty 42–35)
- (8:23) LIB – Kaidon Salter 35 yard rush, Nick Brown kick (Drive: 4 plays, 80 yards, 1:19; Liberty 49–35)

| Statistics | NMSU | LIB |
|---|---|---|
| First downs | 28 | 34 |
| Plays–yards | 63–499 | 70–712 |
| Rushes–yards | 28–177 | 45–393 |
| Passing yards | 322 | 319 |
| Passing: comp–att–int | 21–35–1 | 20–25–0 |
| Turnovers | | |
| Time of possession | 30:13 | 29:47 |

| Team | Category | Player | Statistics |
|---|---|---|---|
| New Mexico State | Passing | Diego Pavia | 11/16, 188 yards, 3 TD |
| New Mexico State | Rushing | Diego Pavia | 5 carries, 45 yards, 1 TD |
| New Mexico State | Receiving | Trent Hudson | 7 receptions, 112 yards, 2 TD |
| Liberty | Passing | Kaidon Salter | 20/25, 319 yards, 2 TD |
| Liberty | Rushing | Kaidon Salter | 12 carries, 165 yards, 1 TD |
| Liberty | Receiving | C.J. Daniels | 7 receptions, 157 yards, 1 TD |
