= 2023 Louisiana Tech Bulldogs football team =

American college football season

2023 Louisiana Tech Bulldogs football
- Conference: Conference USA
- Record: 3–9 (2–6 C-USA)
- Head coach: Sonny Cumbie (2nd season)
- Co-offensive coordinators: Jake Brown (2nd season); Scott Parr (2nd season)
- Offensive scheme: Spread
- Defensive coordinator: Scott Power (2nd season)
- Base defense: 4–3
- Home stadium: Joe Aillet Stadium

2023 Conference USA football standings
| | Conf. | | | Overall |
| Team | W | | L | W | | L |
|---|---|---|---|---|---|---|
| No. 25 Liberty y$ | 8 | – | 0 | 13 | – | 1 |
| New Mexico State y | 7 | – | 1 | 10 | – | 5 |
| Jacksonville State* | 6 | – | 2 | 9 | – | 4 |
| Western Kentucky | 5 | – | 3 | 8 | – | 5 |
| Middle Tennessee | 3 | – | 5 | 4 | – | 8 |
| UTEP | 2 | – | 6 | 3 | – | 9 |
| Sam Houston* | 2 | – | 6 | 3 | – | 9 |
| Louisiana Tech | 2 | – | 6 | 3 | – | 9 |
| FIU | 1 | – | 7 | 4 | – | 8 |
Championship: Liberty 49, New Mexico State 35
$ – Conference champion; y – Championship game participant; * – Ineligible for postseason play due to FCS-to-FBS transition rules; Rankings from AP Poll

The 2023 Louisiana Tech Bulldogs football team represented Louisiana Tech University in the 2023 NCAA Division I FBS football season. The Bulldogs played their home games at Joe Aillet Stadium in Ruston, Louisiana, and compete members of Conference USA. They were led by second-year head coach Sonny Cumbie. The Louisiana Tech Bulldogs football team drew an average home attendance of 15,796 in 2023.

== Preseason ==
=== Conference USA media poll ===
Conference USA media poll
| Predicted finish | Team | Votes (1st place) |
| 1 | Western Kentucky | (18) |
| 2 | Liberty | (4) |
| 3 | Middle Tennessee | |
| 4 | Louisiana Tech | |
| 5 | New Mexico State | |
| 6 | UTEP | |
| 7 | Jacksonville State | |
| T8 | FIU | |
| T8 | Sam Houston | |

== Schedule ==
Louisiana Tech and Conference USA announced the 2023 football schedule on January 10, 2023.

| Date | Time | Opponent | Site | TV | Result | Attendance |
|---|---|---|---|---|---|---|
| August 26 | 8:00 p.m. | FIU | Joe Aillet Stadium; Ruston, LA | CBSSN | W 22–17 | 16,299 |
| September 2 | 11:00 a.m. | at SMU* | Gerald J. Ford Stadium; University Park, TX | ESPNU | L 14–38 | 21,490 |
| September 9 | 6:00 p.m. | Northwestern State* | Joe Aillet Stadium; Ruston, LA (rivalry) | ESPN+ | W 51–21 | 19,152 |
| September 16 | 6:00 p.m. | North Texas* | Joe Aillet Stadium; Ruston, LA | ESPN+ | L 37–40 | 17,434 |
| September 23 | 2:30 p.m. | at Nebraska* | Memorial Stadium; Lincoln, NE | BTN | L 14–28 | 87,115 |
| September 29 | 8:00 p.m. | at UTEP | Sun Bowl; El Paso, TX | CBSSN | W 24–10 | 9,101 |
| October 5 | 7:00 p.m. | Western Kentucky | Joe Aillet Stadium; Ruston, LA | ESPN | L 28–35 | 13,014 |
| October 10 | 6:00 p.m. | at Middle Tennessee | Johnny "Red" Floyd Stadium; Murfreesboro, TN | CBSSN | L 23–31 | 9,602 |
| October 24 | 6:00 p.m. | New Mexico State | Joe Aillet Stadium; Ruston, LA | CBSSN | L 24–27 | 13,798 |
| November 4 | 5:00 p.m. | at Liberty | Williams Stadium; Lynchburg, VA | CBSSN | L 30–56 | 21,647 |
| November 11 | 2:00 p.m. | Sam Houston^{†} | Joe Aillet Stadium; Ruston, LA | ESPN+ | L 27–42 | 15,080 |
| November 18 | 1:00 p.m. | at Jacksonville State | Burgess–Snow Field at JSU Stadium; Jacksonville, AL | ESPN+ | L 17–56 | 20,252 |
*Non-conference game; ^{†}Homecoming; All times are in Central time

== Game summaries ==
=== FIU ===
| | 1 | 2 | 3 | 4 | Total |
|---|---|---|---|---|---|
| Panthers | 14 | 3 | 0 | 0 | 17 |
| Bulldogs | 0 | 13 | 0 | 9 | 22 |

| Statistics | FIU | LT |
|---|---|---|
| First downs | 8 | 27 |
| Total yards | 182 | 450 |
| Rushing yards | 178 | 117 |
| Passing yards | 4 | 333 |
| Turnovers | 1 | 2 |
| Time of possession | 21:42 | 38:18 |

| Team | Category | Player | Statistics |
|---|---|---|---|
| FIU | Passing | Grayson James | 5/14, 4 yards, INT |
| FIU | Rushing | Shomari Lawrence | 15 rushes, 139 yards, TD |
| FIU | Receiving | Josiah Miamen | 1 reception, 4 yards |
| Louisiana Tech | Passing | Hank Bachmeier | 34/44, 333 yards, TD, INT |
| Louisiana Tech | Rushing | Charvis Thornton | 8 rushes, 51 yards |
| Louisiana Tech | Receiving | Smoke Harris | 11 receptions, 155 yards, TD |

=== At SMU ===
| | 1 | 2 | 3 | 4 | Total |
|---|---|---|---|---|---|
| Bulldogs | 0 | 0 | 7 | 7 | 14 |
| Mustangs | 14 | 17 | 0 | 7 | 38 |

| Statistics | LT | SMU |
|---|---|---|
| First downs | 11 | 24 |
| Total yards | 269 | 457 |
| Rushing yards | 28 | 209 |
| Passing yards | 241 | 248 |
| Turnovers | 1 | 0 |
| Time of possession | 26:03 | 33:57 |

| Team | Category | Player | Statistics |
|---|---|---|---|
| Louisiana Tech | Passing | Hank Bachmeier | 21/33, 241 yards, TD, INT |
| Louisiana Tech | Rushing | Charvis Thornton | 8 rushes, 24 yards |
| Louisiana Tech | Receiving | Koby Duru | 3 receptions, 55 yards, TD |
| SMU | Passing | Preston Stone | 23/37, 248 yards, 3 TD |
| SMU | Rushing | L. J. Johnson Jr. | 14 rushes, 128 yards, TD |
| SMU | Receiving | Jordan Hudson | 2 receptions, 72 yards, TD |

=== Northwestern State ===
| | 1 | 2 | 3 | 4 | Total |
|---|---|---|---|---|---|
| Demons | 7 | 7 | 7 | 0 | 21 |
| Bulldogs | 10 | 21 | 20 | 0 | 51 |

| Statistics | NWST | LT |
|---|---|---|
| First downs | 20 | 22 |
| Total yards | 324 | 478 |
| Rushing yards | 185 | 367 |
| Passing yards | 139 | 111 |
| Turnovers | 3 | 2 |
| Time of possession | 31:41 | 28:19 |

| Team | Category | Player | Statistics |
|---|---|---|---|
| Northwestern State | Passing | Tyler Vander Waal | 10/24, 134 yards, TD, 3 INT |
| Northwestern State | Rushing | Kolbe Burrell | 11 rushes, 56 yards, TD |
| Northwestern State | Receiving | Jaren Mitchell | 4 receptions, 60 yards |
| Louisiana Tech | Passing | Hank Bachmeier | 9/18, 110 yards, TD |
| Louisiana Tech | Rushing | Keith Willis Jr. | 13 rushes, 188 yards, 2 TD |
| Louisiana Tech | Receiving | Kyle Maxwell | 1 reception, 42 yards |

=== North Texas ===
| | 1 | 2 | 3 | 4 | Total |
|---|---|---|---|---|---|
| Mean Green | 10 | 13 | 7 | 10 | 40 |
| Bulldogs | 0 | 14 | 0 | 23 | 37 |

| Statistics | UNT | LT |
|---|---|---|
| First downs | 32 | 21 |
| Total yards | 562 | 432 |
| Rushing yards | 249 | 215 |
| Passing yards | 313 | 217 |
| Turnovers | 1 | 1 |
| Time of possession | 33:24 | 26:36 |

| Team | Category | Player | Statistics |
|---|---|---|---|
| North Texas | Passing | Chandler Rogers | 24/40, 313 yards, 2 TD |
| North Texas | Rushing | Ayo Adeyi | 19 rushes, 148 yards, 2 TD |
| North Texas | Receiving | Roderic Burns | 11 receptions, 134 yards |
| Louisiana Tech | Passing | Jack Turner | 9/13, 145 yards, TD |
| Louisiana Tech | Rushing | Tyre Shelton | 16 rushes, 152 yards, TD |
| Louisiana Tech | Receiving | Cyrus Allen | 5 receptions, 82 yards, TD |

=== At Nebraska ===
| | 1 | 2 | 3 | 4 | Total |
|---|---|---|---|---|---|
| Bulldogs | 0 | 7 | 0 | 7 | 14 |
| Cornhuskers | 0 | 7 | 7 | 14 | 28 |

| Statistics | LT | NEB |
|---|---|---|
| First downs | 17 | 20 |
| Total yards | 338 | 419 |
| Rushing yards | 46 | 312 |
| Passing yards | 292 | 107 |
| Turnovers | 1 | 0 |
| Time of possession | 28:02 | 31:58 |

| Team | Category | Player | Statistics |
|---|---|---|---|
| Louisiana Tech | Passing | Jack Turner | 27/42, 292 yards, TD, INT |
| Louisiana Tech | Rushing | Jacob Fields | 6 rushes, 28 yards, TD |
| Louisiana Tech | Receiving | Cyrus Allen | 6 receptions, 102 yards, TD |
| Nebraska | Passing | Heinrich Haarberg | 8/17, 107 yards, TD |
| Nebraska | Rushing | Heinrich Haarberg | 19 rushes, 157 yards, TD |
| Nebraska | Receiving | Billy Kemp IV | 5 receptions, 62 yards |

=== At UTEP ===
| | 1 | 2 | 3 | 4 | Total |
|---|---|---|---|---|---|
| Bulldogs | 14 | 3 | 0 | 7 | 24 |
| Miners | 0 | 7 | 3 | 0 | 10 |

| Statistics | LT | UTEP |
|---|---|---|
| First downs | 14 | 17 |
| Total yards | 294 | 321 |
| Rushing yards | 142 | 220 |
| Passing yards | 152 | 101 |
| Turnovers | 0 | 1 |
| Time of possession | 27:08 | 32:52 |

| Team | Category | Player | Statistics |
|---|---|---|---|
| Louisiana Tech | Passing | Jack Turner | 9/20, 152 yards, TD |
| Louisiana Tech | Rushing | Tyre Shelton | 16 rushes, 104 yards, TD |
| Louisiana Tech | Receiving | Cyrus Allen | 1 reception, 85 yards |
| UTEP | Passing | Cade McConnell | 4/11, 48 yards |
| UTEP | Rushing | Deion Hankins | 15 rushes, 83 yards |
| UTEP | Receiving | Jeremiah Ballard | 3 receptions, 39 yards |

=== Western Kentucky ===
| | 1 | 2 | 3 | 4 | Total |
|---|---|---|---|---|---|
| Hilltoppers | 21 | 14 | 0 | 0 | 35 |
| Bulldogs | 7 | 0 | 14 | 7 | 28 |

| Statistics | WKU | LT |
|---|---|---|
| First downs | 14 | 19 |
| Total yards | 426 | 397 |
| Rushing yards | 129 | 138 |
| Passing yards | 297 | 259 |
| Turnovers | 1 | 2 |
| Time of possession | 26:03 | 33:57 |

| Team | Category | Player | Statistics |
|---|---|---|---|
| Western Kentucky | Passing | Austin Reed | 19/34, 297 yards, 3 TD, INT |
| Western Kentucky | Rushing | Markese Stepp | 9 rushes, 76 yards, TD |
| Western Kentucky | Receiving | Malachi Corley | 8 receptions, 207 yards, 3 TD |
| Louisiana Tech | Passing | Jack Turner | 21/41, 259 yards, TD, 2 INT |
| Louisiana Tech | Rushing | Tyre Shelton | 21 rushes, 118 yards, 2 TD |
| Louisiana Tech | Receiving | Smoke Harris | 11 receptions, 117 yards |

=== At Middle Tennessee ===
| | 1 | 2 | 3 | 4 | Total |
|---|---|---|---|---|---|
| Bulldogs | 6 | 3 | 7 | 7 | 23 |
| Blue Raiders | 10 | 7 | 7 | 7 | 31 |

| Statistics | LT | MTSU |
|---|---|---|
| First downs | 26 | 19 |
| Total yards | 419 | 353 |
| Rushing yards | 79 | 105 |
| Passing yards | 340 | 248 |
| Turnovers | 1 | 1 |
| Time of possession | 31:01 | 28:59 |

| Team | Category | Player | Statistics |
|---|---|---|---|
| Louisiana Tech | Passing | Jack Turner | 14/23, 162 yards, TD, INT |
| Louisiana Tech | Rushing | Tyre Shelton | 10 rushes, 39 yards |
| Louisiana Tech | Receiving | Smoke Harris | 11 receptions, 129 yards |
| Middle Tennessee | Passing | Nicholas Vattiato | 23/29, 248 yards, 2 TD |
| Middle Tennessee | Rushing | Jaiden Credle | 13 rushes, 65 yards, TD |
| Middle Tennessee | Receiving | Holden Willis | 4 reception, 103 yards, TD |

=== New Mexico State ===
| | 1 | 2 | 3 | 4 | Total |
|---|---|---|---|---|---|
| Aggies | 0 | 10 | 14 | 3 | 27 |
| Bulldogs | 3 | 13 | 8 | 0 | 24 |

| Statistics | NMSU | LT |
|---|---|---|
| First downs | 16 | 23 |
| Total yards | 327 | 371 |
| Rushing yards | 232 | 133 |
| Passing yards | 95 | 238 |
| Turnovers | 0 | 2 |
| Time of possession | 29:50 | 30:10 |

| Team | Category | Player | Statistics |
|---|---|---|---|
| New Mexico State | Passing | Diego Pavia | 10/19, 95 yards, TD |
| New Mexico State | Rushing | Star Thomas | 10 carries, 88 yards |
| New Mexico State | Receiving | Jonathan Brady | 2 receptions, 33 yards |
| Louisiana Tech | Passing | Hank Bachmeier | 20/27, 238 yards, TD |
| Louisiana Tech | Rushing | Keldric Moody | 9 carries, 55 yards |
| Louisiana Tech | Receiving | Kyle Maxwell | 3 receptions, 68 yards |

=== At Liberty ===
| | 1 | 2 | 3 | 4 | Total |
|---|---|---|---|---|---|
| Bulldogs | 0 | 0 | 0 | 0 | 0 |
| Flames | 0 | 0 | 0 | 0 | 0 |

| Statistics | LT | LIB |
|---|---|---|
| First downs | | |
| Total yards | | |
| Rushing yards | | |
| Passing yards | | |
| Turnovers | | |
| Time of possession | | |

| Team | Category | Player | Statistics |
|---|---|---|---|
| Louisiana Tech | Passing | | |
| Louisiana Tech | Rushing | | |
| Louisiana Tech | Receiving | | |
| Liberty | Passing | | |
| Liberty | Rushing | | |
| Liberty | Receiving | | |

=== Sam Houston ===
| | 1 | 2 | 3 | 4 | Total |
|---|---|---|---|---|---|
| Bearkats | 7 | 7 | 14 | 14 | 42 |
| Bulldogs | 3 | 3 | 14 | 7 | 27 |

| Statistics | SHSU | LT |
|---|---|---|
| First downs | 19 | 20 |
| Total yards | 413 | 524 |
| Rushing yards | 144 | 105 |
| Passing yards | 269 | 419 |
| Turnovers | 0 | 4 |
| Time of possession | 28:37 | 31:23 |

| Team | Category | Player | Statistics |
|---|---|---|---|
| Sam Houston | Passing | Keegan Shoemaker | 18/28, 269 yards, TD |
| Sam Houston | Rushing | Adrian Murdaugh | 9 carries, 67 yards, TD |
| Sam Houston | Receiving | Noah Smith | 6 receptions, 115 yards |
| Louisiana Tech | Passing | Hank Bachmeier | 29/42, 384 yards, 2 INT |
| Louisiana Tech | Rushing | Charvis Thornton | 2 carries, 48 yards |
| Louisiana Tech | Receiving | Cyrus Allen | 7 receptions, 170 yards, TD |

=== At Jacksonville State ===
| | 1 | 2 | 3 | 4 | Total |
|---|---|---|---|---|---|
| Bulldogs | 0 | 0 | 0 | 0 | 0 |
| Gamecocks | 0 | 0 | 0 | 0 | 0 |

| Statistics | LT | JVST |
|---|---|---|
| First downs | | |
| Total yards | | |
| Rushing yards | | |
| Passing yards | | |
| Turnovers | | |
| Time of possession | | |

| Team | Category | Player | Statistics |
|---|---|---|---|
| Louisiana Tech | Passing | | |
| Louisiana Tech | Rushing | | |
| Louisiana Tech | Receiving | | |
| Jacksonville State | Passing | | |
| Jacksonville State | Rushing | | |
| Jacksonville State | Receiving | | |
