= Logan Smothers =

American football player (born 2000)

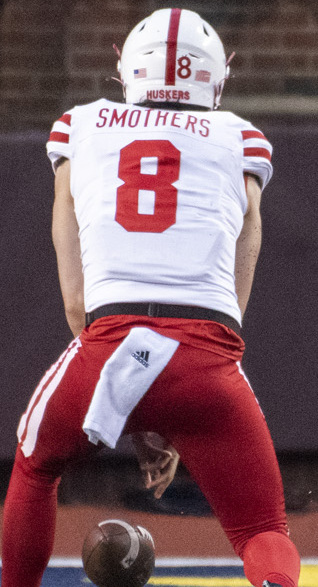
- Smothers with Nebraska in 2022

No. 7
- Position: Quarterback

Personal information
- Born: October 12, 2000 (age 26)
- Listed height: 6 ft 2 in (1.88 m)
- Listed weight: 200 lb (91 kg)

Career information
- High school: Muscle Shoals High School
- College: Nebraska (2020–2022); Jacksonville State (2023–2025)
- Stats at ESPN

Logan Smothers (born October 12, 2000) is an American football quarterback. He played college football for the Nebraska Cornhuskers and the Jacksonville State Gamecocks.

== Early life ==
Smothers was rated a three-star recruit coming out of high school and committed to play college football at the University of Nebraska over other schools such as Ole Miss, Ohio State, Baylor, Virginia, Kentucky, Northwestern, and Louisville.

== College career ==
=== Nebraska ===
Smothers was announced as Nebraska's starting quarterback for their season finale versus Iowa. In his first start, he completed 16 of 22 pass attempts for 198 yards and an interception and rushed for 64 yards and two touchdowns in a loss to the Hawkeyes. Smothers finished the 2021 season going 23 for 33 on passing attempts for 317 yards and an interception, while also rushing for 133 yards and two touchdowns. In the 2022 season, he went ten for 18 for 96 yards and rushed for 28 yards. After the season, Smothers entered the NCAA transfer portal.

=== Jacksonville State ===
Smothers transferred to Jacksonville State. He made his first start with Jacksonville State in week 2 of the 2023 season, where he completed 13 of 17 passes for 127 yards and a touchdown, while also rushing for 40 yards and two touchdowns, in a 49–3 win over East Tennessee State. In week 5, Smothers completed 16 of 28 passes for 197 yards and three touchdowns, while also adding a 16 yard rushing touchdown, as he led a game tying drive in regulation, and a game winning drive in overtime, to comeback to beat Sam Houston State 35–28.
