= Kaelon Black =

American football player (born 2001)

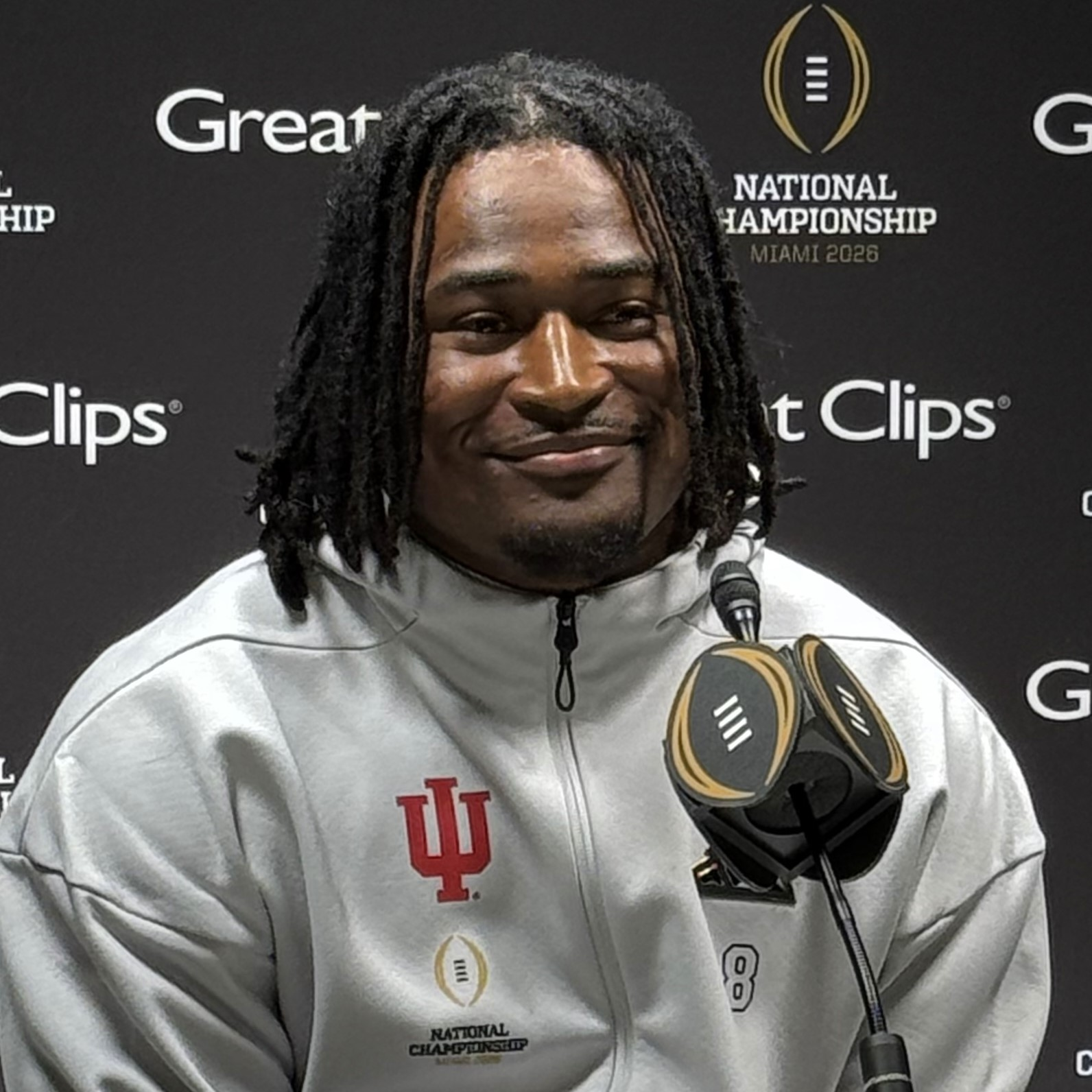
- Black in 2026

No. 26 – San Francisco 49ers
- Position: Running back
- Roster status: Active

Personal information
- Born: October 17, 2001 (age 25); Virginia Beach, Virginia, U.S.
- Listed height: 5 ft 9 in (1.75 m)
- Listed weight: 208 lb (94 kg)

Career information
- High school: Salem (Virginia Beach)
- College: James Madison (2020–2023); Indiana (2024–2025)
- NFL draft: 2026: 3rd round, 90th overall pick

Career history
- San Francisco 49ers (2026–present)

Awards and highlights
- CFP national champion (2025)

Career NFL statistics as of Week 10, 2026
- Rushing yards: 356
- Rushing average: 4.5
- Rushing touchdowns: 2
- Stats at Pro Football Reference

Kaelon Black (KAY-luhn; born October 17, 2001) is an American professional football running back for the San Francisco 49ers of the National Football League (NFL). He played college football for the James Madison Dukes and the Indiana Hoosiers, winning the 2026 National Championship with the latter. Black was selected by the 49ers in the third round of the 2026 NFL draft.

== Early life ==
Black was born October 17, 2001, in Virginia Beach, Virginia, and attended Salem High School. A two-star college football prospect per Rivals.com, he committed to play for the James Madison Dukes. Black was rated the 26th-best senior football player in Virginia by Rivals.com, the 35th-best in Virginia by 247Sports, and the ninth-best in the Hampton Roads region by The Virginian-Pilot. He also competed in basketball and track and field at Salem.

== College career ==
Black began his college football career with the James Madison Dukes. He redshirted the 2020 season after appearing in two games, scoring one touchdown. Black's 2021 season was cut short due to a knee injury suffered in a game against the Weber State Wildcats.

Black played in nine games, with one start, in 2022. He missed two games due to a broken finger. During a 32–28 victory over the Appalachian State Mountaineers, Black scored both a rushing touchdown and a receiving touchdown while gaining 131 yards.

In 2023, Black played in all 13 games, with 12 starts. He rushed for 45 yards and a touchdown, adding 38 receiving yards and two receiving touchdowns, during a 41–13 victory over the Georgia Southern Eagles. During the Royal Rivalry game against the Old Dominion Monarchs, Black rushed for 56 yards and a touchdown as the Dukes won 37–3. He caught a touchdown pass in James Madison's 31–21 loss to the Air Force Falcons in the 2023 Armed Forces Bowl, JMU's first bowl game in program history. Black finished the season with 142 carries for 637 yards and a touchdown to go along with 27 receptions for 254 yards and four touchdowns. He entered the NCAA transfer portal after the 2023 season.

After the 2023 college football season, the Indiana Hoosiers hired James Madison head coach Curt Cignetti to be the program's new head coach. Several James Madison players, including Black, followed Cignetti to Indiana, as did running backs coach John Miller. In 2024, Black appeared in all 13 games for Indiana in a reserve role (behind Justice Ellison and Ty Son Lawton) and on special teams. He rushed for a 21-yard touchdown against the Richmond Spiders. However, lingering injuries limited Black's availability throughout the season. He finished the 2024 season with 46 carries for 251 yards and two touchdowns, averaging 5.5 yards per carry.

In 2025, Black shared the running back role with Roman Hemby, who had newly transferred to the team; the pair emerged as one of the most productive running back tandems of the college football season. Black scored a 40-yard touchdown against the Illinois Fighting Illini, a 21-yard touchdown against the Michigan State Spartans, and a one-yard touchdown against the Penn State Nittany Lions. In the Old Oaken Bucket rivalry game against the Purdue Boilermakers, Black rushed for two touchdowns in a 56–3 win to seal the Hoosiers' first perfect regular season in program history. He rushed for 99 yards and a touchdown in a 38–3 victory over the Alabama Crimson Tide in the 2026 Rose Bowl. During Indiana's 56–22 victory over the Oregon Ducks in the 2026 Peach Bowl, Black rushed for two touchdowns. He rushed for 79 yards, including a 20-yard rush on 3rd-and-7 to extend a touchdown drive, in Indiana's 27–21 victory over the Miami Hurricanes during the 2026 College Football Playoff National Championship. Black accepted an invitation to the 2026 Senior Bowl.

=== Collegiate statistics ===
Year	Team	GP	Rushing				Receiving			
Year	Team	GP	Att	Yds	Avg	TD	Rec	Yds	Avg	TD
2020–21	James Madison	2	25	170	6.8	1	0	0	–	0
2021	James Madison	3	27	165	6.1	0	3	55	18.3	0
2022	James Madison	9	69	333	4.8	3	17	177	10.4	2
2023	James Madison	13	142	637	4.5	1	27	254	9.4	4
2024	Indiana	13	46	251	5.5	2	4	6	1.5	0
2025	Indiana	16	186	1,040	5.6	10	4	36	9.0	0
Career		56	495	2,596	5.2	17	55	528	9.6	6

== Professional career ==
Pre-draft measurables
Height	Weight	Arm length	Hand span	Wingspan	40-yard dash	10-yard split	20-yard split	20-yard shuttle	Vertical jump	Broad jump	Bench press
5 ft 9 1/4 in (1.76 m)	211 lb (96 kg)	29 1/2 in (0.75 m)	8 7/8 in (0.23 m)	5 ft 10 7/8 in (1.80 m)	4.46 s	1.53 s	2.55 s	4.55 s	37.5 in (0.95 m)	10 ft 5 in (3.18 m)	27 reps
All values from Pro Day

Black was selected by the San Francisco 49ers in the third round (90th overall) of the 2026 NFL draft. The 49ers received the selection, as well as the 30th overall pick, from the Miami Dolphins in exchange for their 27th and 138th overall picks. On May 8, he signed his rookie contract with the 49ers.

Black started his rookie season as the 49ers' second-string running back behind veteran Christian McCaffrey. He made his NFL debut during the season-opener against the Los Angeles Rams on Thursday Night Football in an NFL International Series game played in Melbourne, Australia, and finished the 27–7 victory with 14 carries (a team high) for 65 yards. During a Week 7 29–20 road loss to the Atlanta Falcons, Black had 12 carries for 63 yards and his first NFL touchdown on a 30-yard rush. Two weeks later against the Las Vegas Raiders, he led the 49ers in rushing with 11 carries for 70 yards in the 38–17 victory. In the next game against the Dallas Cowboys, Black recorded 11 carries for 53 yards and a touchdown during the 46–40 road victory.

== NFL career statistics ==
=== Regular season ===
Year	Team	Games		Rushing					Receiving					Returning					Fumbles	
Year	Team	GP	GS	Att	Yds	Avg	Lng	TD	Rec	Yds	Avg	Lng	TD	Ret	Yds	Avg	Lng	TD	Fum	Lost
2026	SF	9	0	79	356	4.5	30T	2	5	17	3.4	11	0	2	65	32.5	34	0	2	1
Career		9	0	79	356	4.5	30T	2	5	17	3.4	11	0	2	65	32.5	34	0	2	1
