= Damian Wroblewski =

American football player and coach (born 1976)

Current position
- Title: Assistant offensive line coach
- Team: Maryland
- Conference: Big Ten

Biographical details
- Born: May 4, 1976 (age 50); Westerly, Rhode Island, U.S.

Playing career
- 1995–1999: Lafayette
- Position: Center

Coaching career (HC unless noted)
- 2000: Bryant (OL)
- 2001–2002: Bryant (OC/OL)
- 2003: Penn (ST/TE/OT)
- 2004–2005: Hofstra (OL)
- 2006: Stony Brook (OL)
- 2007–2011: Delaware (AHC/OL/RC)
- 2012–2013: Rutgers (OL)
- 2014–2018: Elon (AHC/OL)
- 2019–2023: James Madison (AHC/OL)
- 2023: James Madison (interim HC)
- 2024–present: Maryland (assistant OL)

Head coaching record
- Overall: 0–1
- Bowls: 0–1

Damian Wroblewski (born May 4, 1976) is an American college football coach and former center. He is the assistant offensive line coach for the University of Maryland. He served as the interim head football coach for James Madison University in 2023. He played college football at Lafayette for coach Bill Russo from 1996 to 1999.

== Coaching career ==
Wroblewski held assistant coaching positions at Bryant, Penn, Hofstra and Stony Brook. Wroblewski served as assistant head coach and offensive line coach of the Delaware Blue Hens football team from 2007 to 2011. He was the offensive line coach formerly for the Rutgers University football team. and served as the offensive line coach and assistant head coach of the Elon University football team.

== Head coaching record ==
Year	Team	Overall	Conference	Standing	Bowl/playoffs
James Madison Dukes (Sun Belt Conference) (2023)
2023	James Madison	0–1 (Note: Wroblewski was named acting head coach for the team's bowl game following Curt Cignetti's departure to Indiana.)	0–0	1st (East)* (Note: James Madison was not eligible for their conference title or post-season play in their first two years of FBS transition while members of the Sun Belt Conference. They tied or had the best record in their division but are technically not division champions due to their transitional restrictions.)	L Armed Forces
James Madison:		0–1	0–0		
Total:		0–1			
