= Jordan McCloud =

American football player (born 1999)

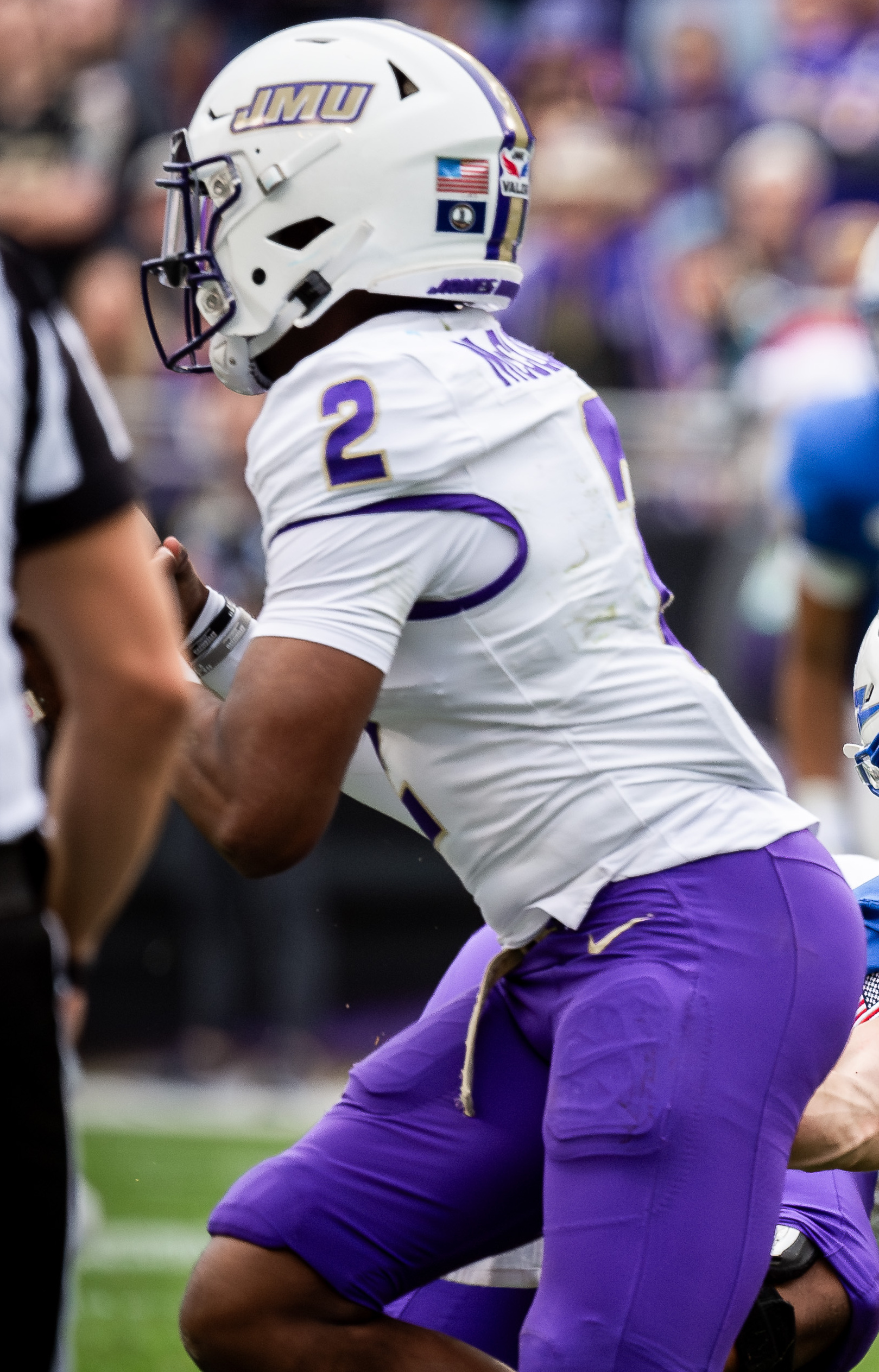
- McCloud in the 2023 Armed Forces Bowl

Profile
- Position: Quarterback

Personal information
- Born: November 4, 1999 (age 27); Tampa, Florida, U.S.
- Listed height: 6 ft 0 in (1.83 m)
- Listed weight: 205 lb (93 kg)

Career information
- High school: Henry B. Plant (Tampa)
- College: South Florida (2018–2020); Arizona (2021–2022); James Madison (2023); Texas State (2024)
- NFL draft: 2025: undrafted

Career history
- Saskatchewan Roughriders (2026)*
- * Offseason or practice squad member only

Awards and highlights
- Sun Belt Player of the Year (2023); First-team All-Sun Belt (2023); Third-team All-Sun Belt (2024)

Jordan McCloud (born November 4, 1999) is an American professional football quarterback. He played college football for the South Florida Bulls, Arizona Wildcats, James Madison Dukes, and Texas State Bobcats. McCloud also played for the Saskatchewan Roughriders of the Canadian Football League (CFL).

== Early life ==
McCloud grew up in Tampa, Florida and attended Henry B. Plant High School. He was rated a three-star recruit and committed to play college football at South Florida over offers from Oregon, Boston College, Iowa State, Maryland, Bowling Green, Colorado State, Southern Miss and Toledo.

== College career ==
=== South Florida ===
McCloud redshirted during his true freshman season in 2018. During the 2019 season, he played in all 12 games and was named the starting quarterback as of the third game of the season. He finished the season with completing 124 out of 224 passing attempts for 1,429 yards, 12 touchdowns and eight interceptions. During the 2020 season, he played in eight games and started in seven of them. He finished the season with completing 120 out of 194 passing attempts for 1,341 yards, nine touchdowns and two interceptions. On December 26, 2020, McCloud announced that he would be entering the transfer portal. On January 30, 2021, he announced that he would be transferring to Arizona.

=== Arizona ===
McCloud began the 2021 season as a backup quarterback to Gunner Cruz and Will Plummer. He made his first appearance with the Wildcats against Northern Arizona where he completed 6 out of 7 passing attempts for 66 yards and a touchdown. In Week 4, he was named the starting quarterback against no. 3 Oregon, becoming the third quarterback to start a game for the Wildcats in the first four games. He completed 21 of 36 passes for 233 yards and one touchdown in the 41–19 loss. McCloud started the following week against UCLA where he was 21–30 passing for 182 yards. Early in the fourth quarter, McCloud suffered a season-ending ankle and knee injury that sidelined him for the final seven games.

In 2022, McCloud lost the starting quarterback competition to Washington State transfer Jayden de Laura. McCloud did not appear in a game and by October 8, 2022, McCloud announced that he was 'not on the team anymore.'

On November 25, 2022, he announced that he would be transferring to James Madison.

=== James Madison ===
In Week 1, McCloud relieved starting quarterback Alonza Barnett III in the second half against Bucknell where he kickstarted the offense throwing for 144 yards and two touchdowns on 7–11 passing. In Week 2, McCloud was named the starter on the road against Virginia where he led the Dukes to a 36–35 victory. In Week 4 against Utah State, he scored a career-high six total touchdowns (4 passing, 2 rushing) in a 45–38 victory. McCloud tied that program record with former Duke quarterbacks Todd Centeio, Cole Johnson and Vad Lee. Because of his performance, he was named the Manning Award Star of the Week, the Davey O'Brien Award Great 8 and the Davey O'Brien National Quarterback Award Midseason Watch List. In Week 10 vs. UConn, McCloud continued his success throwing for a career high 457 yards and four touchdowns while completing 33–37 attempts in a 44–6 victory. His 453 yards of total offense was fifth most by a Dukes player in single-game history. In the 2023 Armed Forces Bowl McCloud threw for 257 yards and three touchdowns.

On the season, McCloud threw for 35 touchdowns and 3,657 passing yards which ranked second in the Dukes single-season passing records. He was named Sun Belt Conference Player of the Year and also First Team All-Sun Belt. McCloud also was named Davey O'Brein National Quarterback Award Semifinalist and was named three-time Sun Belt Offensive Player of the Week.

On December 1, 2023, McCloud announced that he was once again entering the transfer portal and would leave James Madison.

=== Texas State ===
On February 27, 2024, McCloud announced that he would commit to play for the Texas State Bobcats. In week 1, McCloud led the Bobcats to a victory over Lamar in which he completed 21-of-30 attempts for 238 yards and three touchdowns. In week 2, he threw for 309 yards and four total touchdowns (2 passing, 2 rushing) in a blowout win against UTSA. For his performance, he was named Sun Belt Conference Offensive Player of the Week.

=== Statistics ===
Year	Team	Games			Passing								Rushing			
Year	Team	GP	GS	Record	Cmp	Att	Pct	Yds	Avg	TD	INT	Rtg	Att	Yds	Avg	TD
2018	South Florida	Redshirt (redshirt)														
2019	South Florida	12	10	4–6	124	224	55.4	1,429	6.4	12	8	119.5	105	283	2.7	4
2020	South Florida	8	7	1–6	120	194	61.9	1,341	6.9	9	2	133.2	62	74	1.2	1
2021	Arizona	3	2	0–2	48	73	65.8	481	6.6	2	5	116.4	18	75	4.2	0
2022	Arizona	DNP														
2023	James Madison	13	12	10–2	281	412	68.2	3,657	8.9	35	10	165.9	96	276	2.9	8
2024	Texas State	13	13	8–5	273	390	70.0	3,227	8.3	30	13	158.2	74	278	3.8	7
Career		49	44	23–21	846	1,293	65.4	10,135	7.8	88	38	147.9	355	986	2.8	20

== Professional career ==
On April 27, 2025, McCloud received a rookie minicamp invite by the Tampa Bay Buccaneers, but was not offered a contract.

On January 26, 2026, McCloud signed to play with the Saskatchewan Roughriders of the Canadian Football League (CFL). He was released by the Roughriders on May 13.

== Personal life ==
McCloud is the younger brother of current NFL wide receiver and return specialist, Ray-Ray McCloud.
