= 2023 James Madison Dukes football team =

American college football season

2023 James Madison Dukes football

Sun Belt East Division champion (Note: James Madison was ineligible to participate in the SBC championship game due to FCS-to-FBS transition rules.)

Armed Forces Bowl, L 21–31 vs. Air Force
- Conference: Sun Belt Conference
- East Division
- Record: 11–2 (7–1 Sun Belt)
- Head coach: Curt Cignetti (5th season; regular season); Damian Wroblewski (interim, bowl game)
- Offensive coordinator: Mike Shanahan (3rd season)
- Offensive scheme: Spread
- Defensive coordinator: Bryant Haines (2nd season)
- Base defense: 4–2–5
- Home stadium: Bridgeforth Stadium

2023 Sun Belt Conference football standings
	Conf.			Overall
Team	W		L	W		L
East Division
James Madison* x	7	–	1	11	–	2
Appalachian State y	6	–	2	9	–	5
Coastal Carolina	5	–	3	8	–	5
Old Dominion	5	–	3	6	–	7
Georgia State	3	–	5	7	–	6
Marshall	3	–	5	6	–	7
Georgia Southern	3	–	5	6	–	7
West Division
Troy xy$	7	–	1	11	–	3
Texas State	4	–	4	8	–	5
Arkansas State	4	–	4	6	–	7
South Alabama	4	–	4	7	–	6
Louisiana	3	–	5	6	–	7
Southern Miss	2	–	6	3	–	9
Louisiana–Monroe	0	–	8	2	–	10
Championship: Troy 49, Appalachian State 23
$ – Conference champion; x – Division champion/co-champions; y – Championship game participant; * – Ineligible for postseason play due to FCS-to-FBS transition rules

The 2023 James Madison Dukes football team represented James Madison University as a member of the East Division of the Sun Belt Conference during the 2023 NCAA Division I FBS football season. Led by fifth-year head coach Curt Cignetti, the Dukes played home games at Bridgeforth Stadium in Harrisonburg, Virginia as members of the East division of the Sun Belt Conference.

The season was the final year of a two-year transition from the Football Championship Subdivision. The team was not originally eligible for a bowl game; a request for a waiver was denied by the NCAA in August, and a waiver for relief was also denied in November. However, as there were not enough bowl eligible teams, they were given a berth. JMU was selected to play in the Armed Forces Bowl.

== Schedule ==
The football schedule was announced February 24, 2023.

Date	Time	Opponent	Rank	Site	TV	Result	Attendance
September 2	6:00 p.m.	Bucknell*		Bridgeforth Stadium; Harrisonburg, VA	ESPN+	W 38–3	23,756
September 9	12:00 p.m.	at Virginia*		Scott Stadium; Charlottesville, VA	ESPNU	W 36–35	56,508
September 16	7:00 p.m.	at Troy		Veterans Memorial Stadium; Troy, AL	NFLN	W 16–14	26,634
September 23	8:00 p.m.	at Utah State*		Maverik Stadium; Logan, UT	MW Network	W 45–38	19,994
September 30	12:00 p.m.	South Alabama		Bridgeforth Stadium; Harrisonburg, VA	ESPNU	W 31–23	26,064
October 14	12:00 p.m.	Georgia Southern		Bridgeforth Stadium; Harrisonburg, VA	ESPN2	W 41–13	25,097
October 19	7:00 p.m.	at Marshall		Joan C. Edwards Stadium; Huntington, WV	ESPN	W 20–9	22,109
October 28	8:00 p.m.	Old Dominion^{†}	No. 25	Bridgeforth Stadium; Harrisonburg, VA (Royal Rivalry)	ESPNU	W 30–27	26,239
November 4	3:30 p.m.	at Georgia State		Center Parc Stadium; Atlanta, GA	ESPN2	W 42–14	15,320
November 11	2:00 p.m.	UConn*		Bridgeforth Stadium; Harrisonburg, VA	ESPN+	W 44–6	25,240
November 18	2:00 p.m.	Appalachian State		Bridgeforth Stadium; Harrisonburg, VA (College GameDay)	ESPN+	L 23–26 ^{OT}	25,838
November 25	3:30 p.m.	at Coastal Carolina		Brooks Stadium; Conway, SC	ESPN2	W 56–14	16,196
December 23	3:30 p.m.	vs. Air Force*		Amon G. Carter Stadium; Fort Worth, TX (Armed Forces Bowl)	ABC	L 21–31	30,828
*Non-conference game; ^{†}Homecoming; Rankings from AP Poll (and CFP Rankings, after October 31) released prior to game; All times are in Eastern time

== Rankings ==
Ranking movements Legend: ██ Increase in ranking ██ Decrease in ranking — = Not ranked RV = Received votes
	Week															
Poll	Pre	1	2	3	4	5	6	7	8	9	10	11	12	13	14	Final
AP	RV	RV	RV	—	—	RV	RV	RV	25	23	21	18	24	24	24	RV
Coaches	RV	RV	RV	RV	RV	RV	RV	RV	25	24	21	21	RV	25	25	RV
CFP	Not released									—	—	—	—	—	—	Not released

== Preseason ==
In the Sun Belt preseason coaches' poll, the Dukes were picked to finish in first place in the East division.

Offensive lineman Nick Kidwell, defensive lineman James Carpenter, and punter Ryan Hanson were named to the preseason All-Sun Belt first team. Linebacker Taurus Jones was named to the second team.

== Game summaries ==
=== vs South Alabama ===
South Alabama Jaguars (2–2) at James Madison Dukes (4–0)

Quarter	1	2	3	4	Total
Jaguars	0	7	3	13	23
Dukes	14	10	0	7	31

at Bridgeforth Stadium, Harrisonburg, VA

- Date: September 30, 2023
- Game time: 11:00 a.m. CDT
- Game weather: Sunny
- Game attendance: 26,064
- Referee: Trennis Livingston
- TV announcers (ESPNU): Courtney Lyle (play-by-play) and Hutson Mason (analyst)

Game information

First Quarter

- (12:49) JMU – Elijah Sarratt 48-yard pass from Jordan McCloud, Camden Wise kick (Drive: 3 plays, 48 yards, 0:22; James Madison 7–0)
- (8:04) JMU – Zach Horton 44-yard pass from Jordan McCloud, Camden Wise kick (Drive: 1 plays, 44 yards, 0:11; James Madison 14–0)

Second Quarter

- (6:10) JMU – Camden Wise 31-yard field goal (Drive: 9 plays, 70 yards, 3:56; James Madison 17–0)
- (5:37) USA – Jamaal Pritchett 48-yard pass from Carter Bradley, Diego Guajardo kick (Drive: 2 plays, 70 yards, 0:29; James Madison 17–7)
- (3:49) JMU – Jalen Green 24-yard interception, Camden Wise kick (Drive: James Madison 24–7)

Third Quarter

- (0:21) USA – Diego Guajardo 40-yard field goal (Drive: 10 plays, 51 yards, 4:37; James Madison 24–10)

Fourth Quarter

- (11:32) JMU – Zach Horton 66-yard pass from Jordan McCloud, Camden Wise kick (Drive: 2 plays, 71 yards, 0:49; James Madison 31–10)
- (8:19) USA – Lincoln Sefcik 3-yard pass from Carter Bradley (Drive: 9 plays, 75 yards, 3:13; James Madison 31–16)
- (3:56) USA – La'Damian Webb 1-yard run, Diego Guajardo kick (Drive: 7 plays, 89 yards, 1:48; James Madison 31–23)

Win Probability

Line

Over/Under

Statistics	USA	JMU
First downs	20	15
Total yards	326	377
Rushing yards	3	7
Passing yards	12	6
Passing: Comp–Att–Int	28–50–2	12–22–1
Time of possession	28:46	31:14

Team	Category	Player	Statistics
South Alabama	Passing	Carter Bradley	28/50, 299 yards, 2 TD, 2 INT
South Alabama	Rushing	La'Damian Webb	12 carries, 36 yards, TD
South Alabama	Receiving	Caullin Lacy	6 receptions, 132 yards
James Madison	Passing	Jordan McCloud	12/22, 241 yards, 3 TD, INT
James Madison	Rushing	Jordan McCloud	10 carries, 61 yards
James Madison	Receiving	Zach Horton	3 receptions, 116 yards, 2 TD

=== at Marshall ===
Game Seven – James Madison Dukes (6–0) at Marshall Thundering Herd (4–2)

Quarter	1	2	3	4	Total
Dukes	0	3	10	7	20
Thundering Herd	0	0	2	7	9

at Joan C. Edwards Stadium • Huntington, West Virginia

- Date: Thursday, October 19, 2023
- Game time: 7:00 p.m. EDT
- Game weather: Sunny
- Game attendance: 22,109
- Referee: Wayne Winkler
- TV announcers (ESPN): Matt Barrie (play-by-play), Roddy Jones (analyst), Harry Lyles Jr. (sideline)

Game information

First quarter

- No scoring plays

Second quarter

- (11:38) JMU – Camden Wise 27 yard field goal (Drive: 7 plays, 65 yards, 3:53; James Madison 3–0)

Third quarter

- (11:57) MRSH – TyQaze Leggs safety (James Madison 3–2)
- (7:17) JMU – Camden Wise 38 yard field goal (Drive: 6 plays, 79 yards, 3:00; James Madison 6–2)
- (1:12) JMU – Jordan McCloud 6 yard run, Camden Wise kick (Drive: 10 plays, 62 yards, 4:55; James Madison 13–2)

Fourth quarter

- (14:08) JMU – Reggie Brown 28 yard pass from Jordan McCloud, Camden Wise kick (Drive: 5 plays, 37 yards, 1:17; James Madison 20–2)
- (13:55) MRSH – Jayden Harrison 94 yard kickoff return, Rece Verhoff kick (James Madison 20–9)

Statistics	JMU	MRSH
First downs	19	10
Plays–yards	69–405	62–169
Rushes–yards	36–131	32–-4
Passing yards	274	173
Passing: comp–att–int	22–33–1	17–30–1
Turnovers		
Time of possession	33:49	26:11

Team	Category	Player	Statistics
James Madison	Passing	Jordan McCloud	21/31, 264 yards, 1 TD, 1 INT
James Madison	Rushing	Jordan McCloud	6 carries, 69 yards, 1 TD
James Madison	Receiving	Reggie Brown	6 receptions, 126 yards, 1 TD
Marshall	Passing	Cam Fancher	17/30, 173 yards, 1 INT
Marshall	Rushing	Ethan Payne	20 carries, 62 yards
Marshall	Receiving	Jayden Harrison	4 receptions, 40 yards

=== at Georgia State ===
Game Nine – James Madison Dukes (8–0) vs Georgia State Panthers (6–2)

Quarter	1	2	3	4	Total
Dukes	0	0	0	0	0
Panthers	0	0	0	0	0

at Center Parc Stadium • Atlanta, Georgia

- Date: November 4, 2023
- Game time: 3:30 p.m. EST
- Game attendance: 15,320
- TV announcers (ESPN2): Beth Mowins (play-by-play) and Kirk Morrison (analyst)

Game information

First quarter
Second quarter
Third quarter
Fourth quarter

Win Probability

Line

Over/Under

Statistics	JMU	GSU
First downs		
Total yards		
Rushing yards		
Passing yards		
Turnovers		
Time of possession		

Team	Category	Player	Statistics
James Madison	Passing		
James Madison	Rushing		
James Madison	Receiving		
Georgia State	Passing		
Georgia State	Rushing		
Georgia State	Receiving		

=== vs UConn ===
UConn Huskies at James Madison Dukes – Game summary

Quarter	1	2	3	4	Total
Huskies	0	3	3	0	6
Dukes	3	10	17	14	44

at Bridgeforth Stadium, Harrisonburg, Virginia

- Date: November 11
- Game time: 2:02 p.m.
- Game weather: Sunny, 55 °F (13 °C)
- Game attendance: 25,240
- Referee: Marshall Lewis
- TV announcers (ESPN+): Curt Dudley, Vad Lee, Corey Spector
- Box Score

Game information
First quarter
- JMU – Wise, Camden 34 yd field goal, 0:10. Dukes 3–0. Drive: 12 plays, 78 yards, TOP 06:51

Second quarter

- JMU – Wise, Camden 29 yd field goal, 9:25. Dukes 6–0. Drive: 8 plays, 33 yards, TOP 04:00
- JMU – Brown, Reggie 80 yd pass from McCloud, Jordan (Wise, Camden kick), 7:40. Dukes 13–0. Drive: 1 plays, 80 yards, TOP 00:11
- CONN – Ruelas, Noe 41 yd field goal, 3:26. Dukes 13–3. Drive: 10 plays, 52 yards, TOP 04:14

Third quarter

- JMU – Wise, Camden 28 yd field goal, 12:09. Dukes 16–3. Drive: 6 plays, 29 yards, TOP 02:26
- CONN – Ruelas, Noe 31 yd field goal, 7:42. Dukes 16–6. Drive: 10 plays, 63 yards, TOP 04:21
- JMU – Horton, Zach 21 yd pass from McCloud, Jordan (Wise, Camden kick), 5:54. Dukes 23–6. Drive: 4 plays, 75 yards, TOP 01:48
- JMU – Brown, Reggie 55 yd pass from McCloud, Jordan (Wise, Camden kick), 2:06. Dukes 30–6. Drive: 5 plays, 80 yards, TOP 01:53

Fourth quarter

- JMU – Sproles, Phoenix 5 yd pass from McCloud, Jordan (Wise, Camden kick), 6:43. Dukes 37–6. Drive: 10 plays, 90 yards, TOP 05:04
- JMU – Austin, Brent 81 yd interception (Wise, Camden kick), 3:43. Dukes 44–6.

Statistics

Statistics	CONN	JMU
First downs	15	23
Total yards	319	503
Rushing yards	79	46
Passing yards	240	457
Turnovers	2	0
Time of possession	29:08	30:52

Team	Category	Player	Statistics
UConn	Passing	Ta'Quan Roberson	20/36, 207 yds
UConn	Rushing	Cam Edwards	12 att, 43 yds
UConn	Receiving	Cameron Ross	4 rec, 91 yds
James Madison	Passing	Jordan McCloud	33/37, 457 yds, 4 TDs
James Madison	Rushing	Kaelon Black	4 att, 38 yds
James Madison	Receiving	Reggie Brown	9 rec, 202 yds, 2 TDs

== Roster ==
2023 James Madison Dukes football team roster
Players
Coaches
Offense

Pos.	#	Name	Class
WR	0	Phoenix Sproles	Sr
WR	1	Reggie Brown	Sr
QB	2	Jordan McCloud	Sr
RB	3	Solomon Vanhorse	Sr
RB	5	Latrele Palmer	Sr
RB	6	Kaelon Black	So
RB	7	Ty Son Lawton	Sr
WR	8	Maxwell Moss	Fr
WR	9	Omarion Dollison	Jr
QB	10	Brett Griffis	Fr
QB	11	Billy Atkins	So
WR	12	Jayden Mines	Fr
WR	13	Elijah Sarratt	So
QB	14	Alonza Barnett III	Fr
TE	15	Kyi Wright	Jr
WR	16	Desmond Green	So
TE	17	Taylor Thompson	Jr
QB	18	Blake Kendall	Fr
WR	19	Taji Hudson	So
WR	20	Yamir Knight	Fr
WR	21	Chris Lofton	Fr
RB	23	Sammy Malignaggi	Jr
RB	25	Wayne Knight	So
RB	28	Ke'Marion Baldwin	Fr
RB	32	Kalin Jean	So
WR	37	Blake Barnes	So
RB	40	Peyton Rutherford	Jr
TE	44	Zach Horton	Jr
WR	49	Payton Hunter	Jr
OL	50	Carter Miller	Fr
OL	52	Tyshawn Wyatt	Jr
OL	55	Ronald Altman	Jr
OL	56	Nick Kidwell	Sr
OL	58	Tanner Morris	Jr
OL	60	Carter Sweazie	Fr
OL	62	Wesley Bostic	Fr
OL	66	Cole Potts	Jr
OL	68	Griffin Hart	Fr
OL	69	Breon Brown	Fr
OL	70	Brett Davis	So
OL	71	Isaac Owusu-Appiah	Jr
OL	72	Josh Toner	So
OL	74	Tyler Stephens	Jr
OL	75	Kyle Lenhart	Fr
OL	77	Aaron Gunn	So
OL	78	Cameron Jones	Fr
OL	79	Joseph Simmons	Fr
TE	81	Gabriel Hollingsworth	Jr
WR	82	Troy Lewis	So
WR	83	Erick Harris	Fr
WR	84	Rykin Maxwell	Fr
TE	85	Jordan Funk	Jr
TE	86	Collin Carroll	Fr
TE	88	Ibrahim Barry	Fr
TE	89	Josh Phifer	Fr

Defense

Pos.	#	Name	Class
LB	0	Taurus Jones	Jr
S	1	Que Reid	Sr
CB	2	Chauncey Logan	So
DL	3	Mikail Kamara	So
LB	5	Jailin Walker	Jr
LB	6	Julio Ayamel	Jr
S	7	Jarius Reimonenq	Sr
DL	8	Abi Nwabouku-Okonji	Sr
DL	9	Jamree Kromah	Sr
DL	10	Jalen Green	Sr
LB	11	Aiden Fisher	So
S	12	Josh Sarratt	Sr
CB	14	Nehki Meredith	So
CB	16	Trevell Mullen	Fr
DL	17	Amar Thomas	Fr
S	18	Evan Spivey	Fr
CB	19	D'Angelo Ponds	Fr
S	21	Jamari Somerville	Fr
CB	23	Brent Austin	So
LB	24	Trent Hendrick	So
CB	26	Devyn Coles	Sr
S	27	Jacob Thomas	So
S	28	Kye Holmes	So
CB	30	Justin Eaglin	Fr
CB	31	Antoine Booth	So
S	32	DJ Barksdale	Fr
LB	33	Gannon Weathersby	Fr
S	34	Chris Chukwuneke	Sr
S	35	Jahquil Batts	So
CB	37	Jamaree Seldon	Fr
S	38	Stephen Hollander	Fr
DL	39	Payne Bauer	So
DL	42	Carter Banks	Fr
LB	43	Matthew Channell	Fr
LB	46	Jackson Snyder	Fr
LB	47	Noah Holmes	Jr
DL	48	Greyson Cadd	Fr
S	49	Francis Meehan	Sr
DL	51	Riley Robell	Fr
LB	52	Seth Noatala	So
DL	53	Zai Roberts	So
LB	54	Brandon Fique	So
DL	55	Immanuel Bush	So
DL	59	Tyrique Tucker	Fr
DL	61	Spencer Toth	Fr
DL	92	Darold DeNgohe	Fr
DL	93	Mychal McMullin	Fr
DL	94	Sean Johns	Jr
DL	98	Samson Ogunade	Fr
DL	99	James Carpenter	Jr

Special teams

Pos.	#	Name	Class
K	40	Camden Wise	Sr
K	41	Nathan Patterson	Fr
LS	47	Kaden Schickel	So
P	48	Ryan Hanson	Jr
LS	54	Jack Mowrey	Fr
K	63	Nick Gonzalez	Jr
K	96	Connor Madden	Sr

Head coach

- Curt Cignetti

Coordinators/assistant coaches

- Mike Shanahan (Offensive coordinator / Wide receivers)
- Bryant Haines (Defensive coordinator / Linebackers)
- Grant Cain (Special teams coordinator / Tight ends / Assistant head coach)
- Marcus Hall-Oliver (Safeties)
- Jarred Holley (Cornerbacks)
- John Miller (Running backs)
- Damian Wroblewski (Offensive line / Assistant head coach)
- Tino Sunseri (Quarterbacks / Pass game)
- Pat Kuntz (Defensive line)

Legend

- (C) Team captain
- (S) Suspended
- (I) Ineligible
- Injured
- Redshirt

Roster
Last update: August 29, 2023
