= 2023 NCAA Division I FBS football season =

American college football season

2023 NCAA Division I FBS season
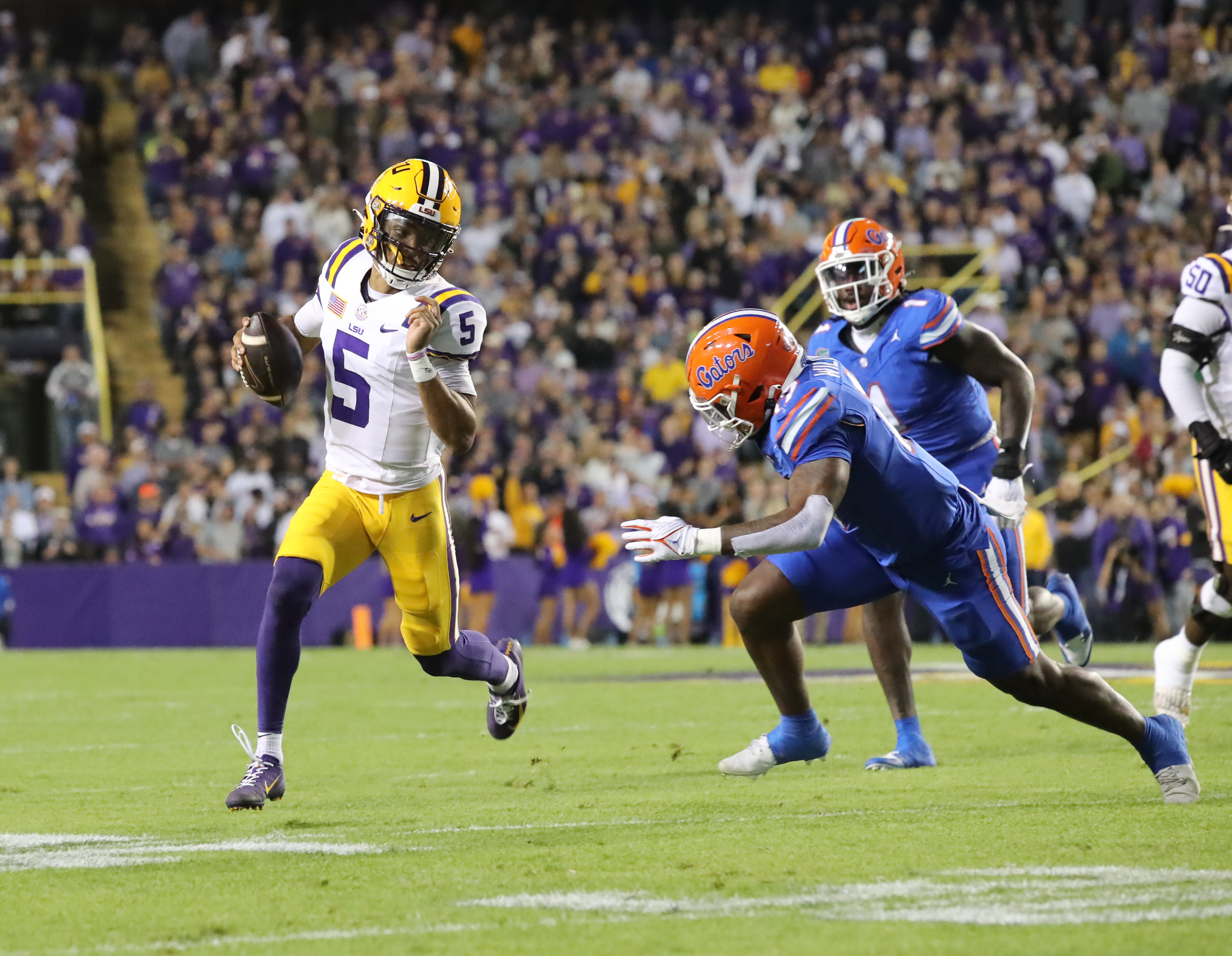
- LSU quarterback Jayden Daniels running from Florida defenders on November 11 at Tiger Stadium.
- Number of teams: 133
- Duration: August 26, 2023 – December 9, 2023
- Preseason AP No. 1: Georgia

Postseason
- Duration: December 15, 2023 – January 8, 2024
- Bowl games: 42 (Note: Bowl count includes the National Championship game.)
- AP Poll No. 1: Michigan
- Coaches Poll No. 1: Michigan
- Heisman Trophy: Jayden Daniels, QB, LSU

College Football Playoff
- 2024 College Football Playoff National Championship
- Site: NRG Stadium (Houston, Texas)
- Champion(s): Michigan

NCAA Division I FBS football seasons
- ← 2022 2024 →

The 2023 NCAA Division I FBS football season was the 154th season of college football in the United States organized by the National Collegiate Athletic Association (NCAA) at its highest level of competition, the Football Bowl Subdivision (FBS). The regular season began on August 26 and ended on December 9. The postseason began on December 15, and, aside from any all-star games that are scheduled, ended on January 8, 2024, with the College Football Playoff National Championship at NRG Stadium in Houston, Texas.

The Michigan Wolverines defeated the Washington Huskies by a score of 34–13 to claim the program's first national championship in the College Football Playoff (CFP) era, and their 12th overall. This was the tenth and final season of using the four team College Football Playoff (CFP) system, with the bracket being expanded to 12 teams for the 2024 season. The season's Heisman Trophy winner was LSU Tigers quarterback Jayden Daniels, who led all players in total yards and set the NCAA single-season passer rating record.

== Rule changes ==
The following rules changes were approved by the NCAA Playing Rules Oversight Committee for the season:

- Mirroring the NFL rule adopted in the 2005 NFL season, teams may not call consecutive timeouts during a single dead ball period.
- Accepted penalties committed on the last play of the first or third quarter will no longer result in an untimed down before the period ends. The penalty enforcement will be marked off and the second or fourth quarter will begin with the ball at the new spot. This modifies the rule adopted in the 1983 season.
- Modifying a rule adopted in the 1968 season, the game clock will no longer be stopped for first downs on offense except inside of the final two minutes of each half. This is similar to a rule used in the current incarnation of the UFL, as well as its predecessors, the USFL and XFL. The NFL does not stop the game clock for first downs at any time in the game. This rule was adopted for all NCAA Football divisions except Division III, which eventually adopted this change in 2024.
- When there is not a replay official in the booth, the on-field officials will have optional replay available in the event of a coaches' challenge. This rule was trialed in the Division II Mid-America Intercollegiate Athletics Association in its 2022 conference season.
- Establishing guidelines for second-half warmup activities, including requiring teams to wait until the field is made available to return and having designated areas of the field to warm up.
- When teams are on the field, drones are not allowed over the playing surface or the team area.
- If a player receives a third targeting penalty in the same season (which requires a one-game suspension) and the penalty is overturned by the National Coordinator of Officials upon appeal, the suspension will be vacated.
- The area where "roughing/running into the kicker" protection ends was expanded to include when the kicker retreats more than five yards behind the spot the kicker was initially lined up to receive the snap. Previously the protection ended only when the kicker ran outside the tackle box before kicking the ball. The rule change was the result of a controversial play in the 2022 game between Missouri and Kentucky, where roughing was called after the Kentucky punter was hit while attempting a rushed kick following a botched snap which sailed more than 20 yards over his head.

Points of Emphasis for the 2023 season included:

- Continued emphasis on targeting, sideline control, concussions, feigning injuries and acts of taunting.
- Pre-snap actions by the offense designed to cause the defense to jump into the neutral zone (abrupt, quick, or jerky motions by the quarterback) and disconcerting signals by the defense designed to cause a false start or snap issues on offense (simulating cadence and other sounds or motions similar to the offense's snap signals, including the use of the "clap" on defense designed to be similar to the offense).
- Rules regarding illegal hits to the quarterback/passer will be more strictly enforced.

== Other headlines ==
- August 15 – Fresno State announced that the Bulldogs' home opener against Eastern Washington on September 9 would be the first-ever FBS game to be broadcast over linear television exclusively in Spanish. The city of Fresno is roughly 60% Hispanic, and the majority of Fresno State's enrollment is Hispanic. The game would be broadcast on UniMás in the Fresno and Bakersfield markets. English-language coverage was exclusively via streaming, with audio by Fresno State's radio broadcast team.
- August 29 – Arizona State announced a self imposed bowl ban for the 2023 season. The ban stems from allegations that Arizona State hosted high school recruits during the COVID-19 dead period. At the time of announcement, an NCAA infractions case was ongoing.
- October 4 – The NCAA announced several major changes to Division I football recruiting and governance rules:
  - The window for athletes to enter the transfer portal was reduced. For FBS players, the portal now opens on the Monday after conference championship games are played and stays open for 30 days. For players participating in the postseason (i.e., bowl games, including the College Football Playoff), there is an additional 5-day window after the players' final game.
  - The limit on "initial counters"—i.e., players who are receiving athletically related financial aid for the first time—was permanently eliminated. The previous limit of 25 had been suspended due to COVID-19 impacts.
  - Football attendance requirements for FBS membership were eliminated, effective immediately.
  - The application fee for transitioning from FCS to FBS increased from $5,000 to $5 million, effective immediately.
  - Starting with the 2027–28 school year, FBS members must fund the equivalent of 210 full scholarships across all sports, and spend at least $6 million annually on such aid.
  - Also starting in 2027–28, FBS members must provide at least 90% of the total number of allowed scholarships across 16 sports, including football. Schools that start FBS transitions in 2024–25 or later must meet both of the aforementioned limits by the end of their two-year transition.
- November 28 – Conference USA announced that Delaware, then a member of the Coastal Athletic Association and its technically separate football arm of CAA Football, would start a transition from FCS to FBS in 2024 and join CUSA in 2025.
- December 1 – The two schools left behind by the collapse of the Pac-12 Conference, Oregon State and Washington State, entered into a scheduling agreement with the Mountain West Conference (MW) for at least the 2024 season. Each MW team would play one game against either of the so-called "Pac-2" schools. These games would not count in the MW standings, and the Pac-2 was not eligible for the MW championship.

== Conference realignment ==
Two schools played their first FBS seasons in 2023. Sam Houston (from the Western Athletic Conference) and Jacksonville State (from the ASUN Conference) began transitions from Division I FCS in 2022 and joined Conference USA (CUSA) in July 2023.

Two other Independent schools, Liberty and New Mexico State, joined CUSA in 2023; those schools had respectively been full members of the ASUN and WAC.

Six schools from CUSA joined the American Athletic Conference for the 2023 season—Charlotte, Florida Atlantic, North Texas, Rice, UAB, and UTSA. This followed the departure of Cincinnati, Houston, and UCF from The American for the Big 12 Conference in 2023. In addition, BYU, previously an FBS independent, joined the Big 12.

Team	Conference in 2022	Conference in 2023
BYU	Independent (FBS)	Big 12
Charlotte	CUSA	American
Cincinnati	American	Big 12
Florida Atlantic	CUSA	American
Houston	American	Big 12
Jacksonville State	ASUN (FCS)	CUSA
Liberty	Independent (FBS)	CUSA
New Mexico State	Independent (FBS)	CUSA
North Texas	CUSA	American
Rice	CUSA	American
Sam Houston	WAC (FCS)	CUSA
UAB	CUSA	American
UCF	American	Big 12
UTSA	CUSA	American

The 2023 season was the last for 13 FBS teams in their current conferences, and was also the last for Army as an FBS independent.

School	Current conference	Future conference
Arizona	Pac-12	Big 12
Arizona State	Pac-12	Big 12
Army	Independent (FBS)	American
California	Pac-12	ACC
Colorado	Pac-12	Big 12
Kennesaw State	Independent (FCS)	CUSA
Oklahoma	Big 12	SEC
Oregon	Pac-12	Big Ten
SMU	American	ACC
Stanford	Pac-12	ACC
Texas	Big 12	SEC
UCLA	Pac-12	Big Ten
USC	Pac-12	Big Ten
Utah	Pac-12	Big 12
Washington	Pac-12	Big Ten

One FCS school, Kennesaw State, started the transition of its program to FBS in the 2023 season by leaving the ASUN Conference and playing the 2023 season as an FCS independent. It joined CUSA in 2024.

== Stadiums ==
- Arizona State announced a 15-year naming rights agreement to change the name of its stadium to Mountain America Stadium.
- Louisville announced a 20-year naming rights agreement to change the name of its stadium to L&N Federal Credit Union Stadium. Significantly, the credit union had been founded in 1954 at the current stadium site.
- North Texas announced a naming rights agreement with the Denton Area Teachers Credit Union to change the name of its stadium to DATCU Stadium.

== Kickoff games ==
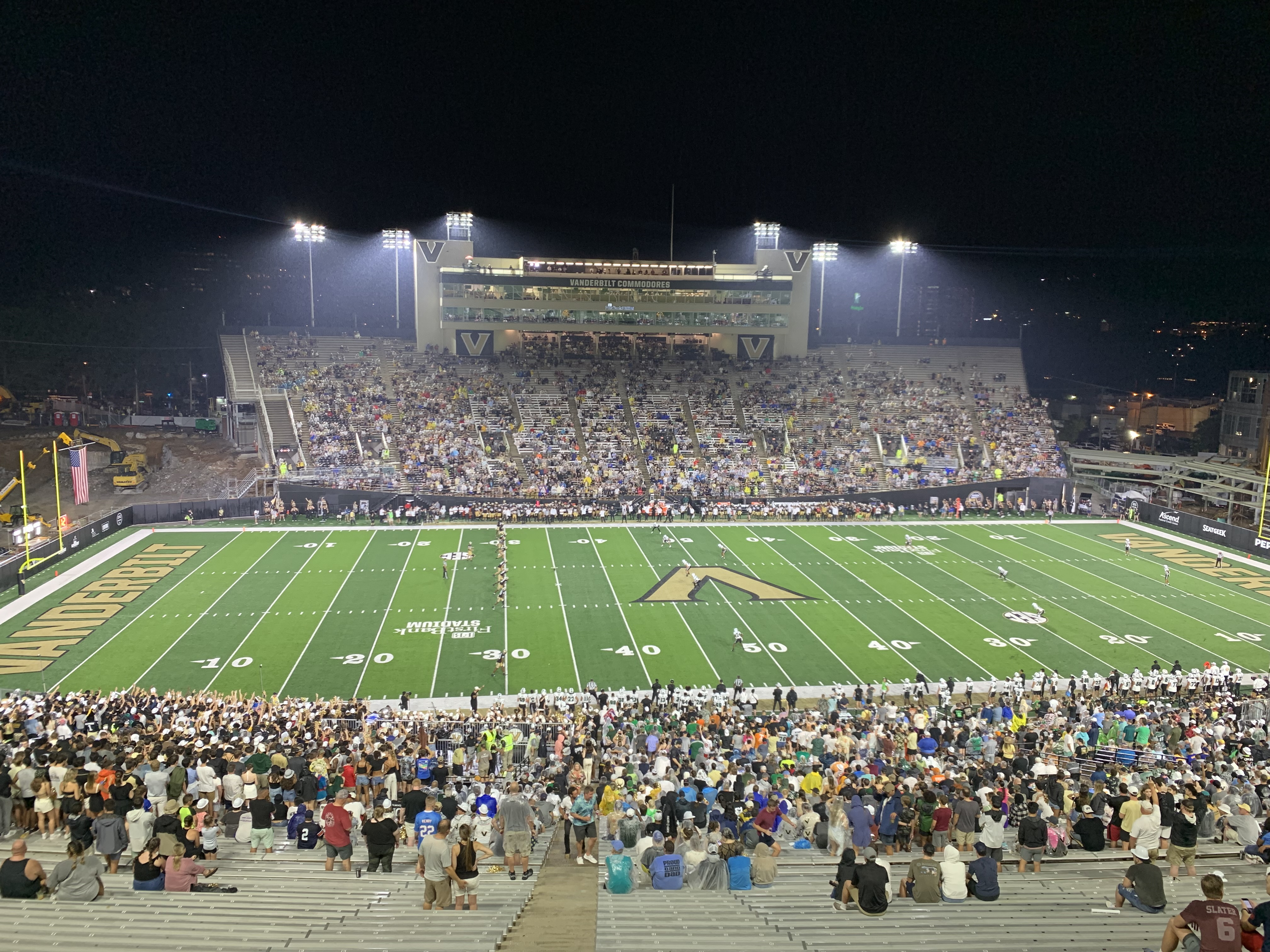
FirstBank Stadium during the Vanderbilt vs. Hawaii week zero game

Rankings reflect the AP Poll entering each week.

=== "Week 0" ===
The regular season began on Saturday, August 26 with seven games in Week 0.

- Aer Lingus College Football Classic
  - No. 13 Notre Dame 42, Navy 3 (at Aviva Stadium, Dublin, Ireland)
- Jacksonville State 17, UTEP 14
- Louisiana Tech 22, FIU 17
- San Diego State 20, Ohio 13
- No. 6 USC 56, San Jose State 28
- UMass 41, New Mexico State 30
- Vanderbilt 35, Hawaii 28

=== Week 1 ===
- Aflac Kickoff Game:
  - Louisville 39, Georgia Tech 34 (at Mercedes-Benz Stadium, Atlanta, Georgia)
- Duke's Mayo Classic:
  - No. 21 North Carolina 31, South Carolina 17 (at Bank of America Stadium, Charlotte, North Carolina)
- Camping World Kickoff:
  - No. 8 Florida State 45, No. 5 LSU 24 (at Camping World Stadium, Orlando, Florida)

=== Week 2 ===
- Allstate Crossbar Classic:
  - No. 11 Texas 34, No. 3 Alabama 24 (at Bryant–Denny Stadium, Tuscaloosa, Alabama)

== Top 10 matchups ==
Rankings through Week 9 reflect the AP Poll. Rankings for Week 10 and beyond will list College Football Playoff Rankings first and AP Poll second. Teams that failed to be a top 10 team for one poll or the other will be noted.

=== Regular season ===
- Week 1
  - No. 8 Florida State defeated No. 5 LSU, 45–24 (Camping World Kickoff, Camping World Stadium, Orlando, Florida)
- Week 4
  - No. 6 Ohio State defeated No. 9 Notre Dame, 17–14 (Notre Dame Stadium, Notre Dame, Indiana)
- Week 7
  - No. 7 Washington defeated No. 8 Oregon, 36–33 (Husky Stadium, Seattle, Washington)
- Week 8
  - No. 3 Ohio State defeated No. 7 Penn State, 20–12 (Ohio Stadium, Columbus, Ohio)
- Week 11
  - No. 3/2 Michigan defeated No. 10/9 Penn State, 24–15 (Beaver Stadium, University Park, Pennsylvania)
  - No. 2/1 Georgia defeated No. 9/10 Ole Miss, 52–17 (Sanford Stadium, Athens, Georgia)
- Week 12
  - No. 5/5 Washington defeated No. 11/10 Oregon State, 22–20 (Reser Stadium, Corvallis, Oregon)
- Week 13
  - No. 3/3 Michigan defeated No. 2/2 Ohio State, 30–24 (Michigan Stadium, Ann Arbor, Michigan)

=== Conference championship games ===
- No. 3/3 Washington defeated No. 5/5 Oregon, 34–31 (Allegiant Stadium, Paradise, Nevada)
- No. 8/8 Alabama defeated No. 1/1 Georgia, 27–24 (Mercedes-Benz Stadium, Atlanta, Georgia)

=== Bowl games ===
- Cotton Bowl
  - No. 9 Missouri defeated No. 7 Ohio State, 14–3 (AT&T Stadium, Arlington, TX)
- Orange Bowl
  - No. 6 Georgia defeated No. 5 Florida State, 63–3 (Hard Rock Stadium, Miami Gardens, FL)
- Rose Bowl (CFB Playoff semifinal)
  - No. 1 Michigan defeated No. 4 Alabama, 27–20^{OT} (Rose Bowl, Pasadena, CA)
- Sugar Bowl (CFB Playoff semifinal)
  - No. 2 Washington defeated No. 3 Texas, 37–31 (Caesars Superdome, New Orleans, LA)
- CFB Playoff National Championship Game
  - No. 1 Michigan defeated No. 2 Washington, 34–13 (NRG Stadium, Houston, TX)

== FCS team wins over FBS teams ==
Italics denotes FCS teams.

Date	Visiting team	Home team	Site	Result	Attendance	Ref.
September 9	No. 24 (FCS) Southern Illinois	Northern Illinois	Huskie Stadium • DeKalb, Illinois	14–11	13,114	
September 9	Fordham	Buffalo	UB Stadium • Amherst, New York	40–37	15,854	
September 9	No. 7 (FCS) Idaho	Nevada	Mackay Stadium • Reno, Nevada	33–6 (Note: Idaho was a 5.5-point favorite at kickoff.)	19,852	
September 16	No. 8 (FCS) Sacramento State	Stanford	Stanford Stadium • Stanford, California	30–23	23,848	
^{#}Rankings from AP Poll released prior to game.

== Upsets ==
This section lists instances of unranked teams defeating AP Poll-ranked teams during the season.

=== Regular season ===
- September 2, 2023
  - Colorado 45, No. 17 TCU 42
- September 4, 2023
  - Duke 28, No. 9 Clemson 7
- September 9, 2023
  - Washington State 31, No. 19 Wisconsin 22
  - Miami (FL) 48, No. 23 Texas A&M 33
- September 16, 2023
  - Florida 29, No. 11 Tennessee 16
  - Missouri 30, No. 15 Kansas State 27
- September 30, 2023
  - Kentucky 33, No. 22 Florida 14
- October 7, 2023
  - UCLA 25, No. 13 Washington State 17
  - Georgia Tech 23, No. 17 Miami (FL) 20
  - Wyoming 24, No. 24 Fresno State 19
- October 14, 2023
  - Pittsburgh 38, No. 14 Louisville 21
  - Arizona 44, No. 19 Washington State 6
  - Oklahoma State 39, No. 23 Kansas 32
  - Missouri 38, No. 24 Kentucky 21
- October 21, 2023
  - Virginia 31, No. 10 North Carolina 27
  - Minnesota 12, No. 24 Iowa 10
- October 28, 2023
  - Kansas 38, No. 6 Oklahoma 33
  - Arizona 27, No. 11 Oregon State 24
  - Georgia Tech 46, No. 17 North Carolina 42
- November 4, 2023
  - Oklahoma State 27, No. 10 Oklahoma 24
  - Clemson 31, No. 12 Notre Dame 23
  - Army 23, No. 17 Air Force 3
  - Arizona 27, No. 20 UCLA 10
- November 11, 2023
  - UCF 45, No. 15 Oklahoma State 3
  - Texas Tech 16, No. 19 Kansas 13
- November 18, 2023
  - Appalachian State 26, No. 18 James Madison 23^{OT}
  - Clemson 31, No. 22 North Carolina 20
- November 25, 2023
  - Kentucky 38, No. 9 Louisville 31
  - Iowa State 42, No. 19 Kansas State 35

=== Bowl games ===
Rankings in this section are based on the final CFP rankings released on December 3, 2023.

- December 27, 2023
  - USC 42, No. 15 Louisville 28 (Holiday Bowl)
- December 28, 2023
  - Boston College 23, No. 24 SMU 14 (Fenway Bowl)

== Conference standings ==
2023 American Athletic Conference football standings
	Conf.			Overall
Team	W		L	W		L
No. 22 SMU y$	8	–	0	11	–	3
Tulane y	8	–	0	11	–	3
UTSA	7	–	1	9	–	4
Memphis	6	–	2	10	–	3
South Florida	4	–	4	7	–	6
Rice	4	–	4	6	–	7
Navy	4	–	4	5	–	7
North Texas	3	–	5	5	–	7
UAB	3	–	5	4	–	8
Florida Atlantic	3	–	5	4	–	8
Charlotte	2	–	6	3	–	9
Tulsa	2	–	6	4	–	8
Temple	1	–	7	3	–	9
East Carolina	1	–	7	2	–	10
Championship: SMU 26, Tulane 14
$ – Conference champion; y – Championship game participant; Rankings from AP Poll

2023 Atlantic Coast Conference football standings
	Conf.			Overall
Team	W		L	W		L
No. 6 Florida State y$	8	–	0	13	–	1
No. 19 Louisville y	7	–	1	10	–	4
No. 21 NC State	6	–	2	9	–	4
Georgia Tech	5	–	3	7	–	6
Virginia Tech	5	–	3	7	–	6
No. 20 Clemson	4	–	4	9	–	4
Duke	4	–	4	8	–	5
North Carolina	4	–	4	8	–	5
Boston College	3	–	5	7	–	6
Miami (FL)	3	–	5	7	–	6
Syracuse	2	–	6	6	–	7
Pittsburgh	2	–	6	3	–	9
Virginia	2	–	6	3	–	9
Wake Forest	1	–	7	4	–	8
Championship: Florida State 16, Louisville 6
$ – Conference champion; y – Championship game participant; Rankings from AP Poll

2023 Big Ten Conference football standings
	Conf.			Overall
Team	W		L	W		L
East Division
No. 1 Michigan xy$#^	9	–	0	15	–	0
No. 10 Ohio State	8	–	1	11	–	2
No. 13 Penn State	7	–	2	10	–	3
Maryland	4	–	5	8	–	5
Rutgers	3	–	6	7	–	6
Indiana	1	–	8	3	–	9
Michigan State†	0	–	7	0	–	8
West Division
No. 24 Iowa xy	7	–	2	10	–	4
Northwestern	5	–	4	8	–	5
Wisconsin	5	–	4	7	–	6
Minnesota	3	–	6	6	–	7
Illinois	3	–	6	5	–	7
Nebraska	3	–	6	5	–	7
Purdue	3	–	6	4	–	8
Championship: Michigan 26, Iowa 0
# – College Football Playoff champion; ^ – College Football Playoff participant; $ – Conference champion; x – Division champion/co-champions; y – Championship game participant; † — NCAA vacated all wins for Michigan State (4–8, 2–7); Rankings from AP Poll

2023 Big 12 Conference football standings
	Conf.			Overall
Team	W		L	W		L
No. 3 Texas y$^	8	–	1	12	–	2
No. 16 Oklahoma State y	7	–	2	10	–	4
No. 15 Oklahoma	7	–	2	10	–	3
Iowa State	6	–	3	7	–	6
No. 18 Kansas State	6	–	3	9	–	4
West Virginia	6	–	3	9	–	4
Texas Tech	5	–	4	7	–	6
No. 23 Kansas	5	–	4	9	–	4
UCF	3	–	6	6	–	7
TCU	3	–	6	5	–	7
Houston	2	–	7	4	–	8
BYU	2	–	7	5	–	7
Baylor	2	–	7	3	–	9
Cincinnati	1	–	8	3	–	9
Championship: Texas 49, Oklahoma State 21
^ – College Football Playoff participant; $ – Conference champion; y – Championship game participant; Rankings from AP Poll

2023 Conference USA football standings
	Conf.			Overall
Team	W		L	W		L
No. 25 Liberty y$	8	–	0	13	–	1
New Mexico State y	7	–	1	10	–	5
Jacksonville State*	6	–	2	9	–	4
Western Kentucky	5	–	3	8	–	5
Middle Tennessee	3	–	5	4	–	8
UTEP	2	–	6	3	–	9
Sam Houston*	2	–	6	3	–	9
Louisiana Tech	2	–	6	3	–	9
FIU	1	–	7	4	–	8
Championship: Liberty 49, New Mexico State 35
$ – Conference champion; y – Championship game participant; * – Ineligible for postseason play due to FCS-to-FBS transition rules; Rankings from AP Poll

2023 Mid-American Conference football standings
	Conf.			Overall
Team	W		L	W		L
East Division
Miami (OH) xy$	7	–	1	11	–	3
Ohio	6	–	2	10	–	3
Bowling Green	5	–	3	7	–	6
Buffalo	3	–	5	3	–	9
Akron	1	–	7	2	–	10
Kent State	0	–	8	1	–	11
West Division
Toledo xy	8	–	0	11	–	3
Northern Illinois	5	–	3	7	–	6
Eastern Michigan	4	–	4	6	–	7
Central Michigan	3	–	5	5	–	7
Ball State	3	–	5	4	–	8
Western Michigan	3	–	5	4	–	8
Championship: Miami (OH) 23, Toledo 14
$ – Conference champion; x – Division champion/co-champions; y – Championship game participant

2023 Mountain West Conference football standings
	Conf.			Overall
Team	W		L	W		L
UNLV y	6	–	2	9	–	5
Boise State y$	6	–	2	8	–	6
San Jose State	6	–	2	7	–	6
Air Force	5	–	3	9	–	4
Wyoming	5	–	3	9	–	4
Fresno State	4	–	4	9	–	4
Utah State	4	–	4	6	–	7
Hawaii	3	–	5	5	–	8
Colorado State	3	–	5	5	–	7
Nevada	2	–	6	2	–	10
New Mexico	2	–	6	4	–	8
San Diego State	2	–	6	4	–	8
Championship: Boise State 44, UNLV 20
$ – Conference champion; y – Championship game participant

2023 Pac-12 Conference football standings
	Conf.			Overall
Team	W		L	W		L
No. 2 Washington y$^	9	–	0	14	–	1
No. 6 Oregon y	8	–	1	12	–	2
No. 11 Arizona	7	–	2	10	–	3
Oregon State	5	–	4	8	–	5
Utah	5	–	4	8	–	5
USC	5	–	4	8	–	5
California	4	–	5	6	–	7
UCLA	4	–	5	8	–	5
Washington State	2	–	7	5	–	7
Stanford	2	–	7	3	–	9
Arizona State*	2	–	7	3	–	9
Colorado	1	–	8	4	–	8
Championship: Washington 34, Oregon 31
^ – College Football Playoff participant; $ – Conference champion; y – Championship game participant; * – Ineligible for postseason play due to self-imposed ban for 2020 recruiting violations; Rankings from AP Poll

2023 Southeastern Conference football standings
	Conf.			Overall
Team	W		L	W		L
Eastern Division
No. 4 Georgia xy	8	–	0	13	–	1
No. 8 Missouri	6	–	2	11	–	2
No. 17 Tennessee	4	–	4	9	–	4
Kentucky	3	–	5	7	–	6
Florida	3	–	5	5	–	7
South Carolina	3	–	5	5	–	7
Vanderbilt	0	–	8	2	–	10
Western Division
No. 5 Alabama xy$^	8	–	0	12	–	2
No. 9 Ole Miss	6	–	2	11	–	2
No. 12 LSU	6	–	2	10	–	3
Texas A&M	4	–	4	7	–	6
Auburn	3	–	5	6	–	7
Mississippi State	1	–	7	5	–	7
Arkansas	1	–	7	4	–	8
Championship: Alabama 27, Georgia 24
^ – College Football Playoff participant; $ – Conference champion; x – Division champion/co-champions; y – Championship game participant; Rankings from AP Poll

2023 Sun Belt Conference football standings
	Conf.			Overall
Team	W		L	W		L
East Division
James Madison* x	7	–	1	11	–	2
Appalachian State y	6	–	2	9	–	5
Coastal Carolina	5	–	3	8	–	5
Old Dominion	5	–	3	6	–	7
Georgia State	3	–	5	7	–	6
Marshall	3	–	5	6	–	7
Georgia Southern	3	–	5	6	–	7
West Division
Troy xy$	7	–	1	11	–	3
Texas State	4	–	4	8	–	5
Arkansas State	4	–	4	6	–	7
South Alabama	4	–	4	7	–	6
Louisiana	3	–	5	6	–	7
Southern Miss	2	–	6	3	–	9
Louisiana–Monroe	0	–	8	2	–	10
Championship: Troy 49, Appalachian State 23
$ – Conference champion; x – Division champion/co-champions; y – Championship game participant; * – Ineligible for postseason play due to FCS-to-FBS transition rules

2023 NCAA Division I FBS independents football records
	Conf.			Overall
Team	W		L	W		L
No. 14 Notre Dame		–		10	–	3
Army		–		6	–	6
UConn		–		3	–	9
UMass		–		3	–	9
Rankings from AP Poll

== Rankings ==
The top 25 from the AP and USA Today Coaches Polls.

=== Pre-season polls ===
AP
Ranking	Team
1	Georgia (60)
2	Michigan (2)
3	Ohio State (1)
4	Alabama
5	LSU
6	USC
7	Penn State
8	Florida State
9	Clemson
10	Washington
11	Texas
12	Tennessee
13	Notre Dame
14	Utah
15	Oregon
16	Kansas State
17	TCU
18	Oregon State
19	Wisconsin
20	Oklahoma
21	North Carolina
22	Ole Miss
23	Texas A&M
24	Tulane
25	Iowa

USA Today Coaches
Ranking	Team
1	Georgia (61)
2	Michigan
3	Alabama (4)
4	Ohio State (1)
5	LSU
6	USC
7	Penn State
8	Florida State
9	Clemson
10	Tennessee
11	Washington
12	Texas
13	Notre Dame
14	Utah
15	Oregon
16	TCU
17	Kansas State
18	Oregon State
19	Oklahoma
20	North Carolina
21	Wisconsin
22	Ole Miss
23	Tulane
24	Texas Tech
25	Texas A&M

=== CFB Playoff final rankings ===
On December 3, 2023, the College Football Playoff selection committee announced its final team rankings for the year. It was the tenth and final season of the CFP era under four teams. This was the first time that an undefeated Power Five conference champion (Florida State) was left out of the semifinals.

Rank	Team	W–L	Conference and standing	Bowl game
1	Michigan Wolverines	13–0	Big Ten champions	Rose Bowl (CFB playoff semifinal)
2	Washington Huskies	13–0	Pac–12 champions	Sugar Bowl (CFB playoff semifinal)
3	Texas Longhorns	12–1	Big 12 champions	Sugar Bowl (CFB playoff semifinal)
4	Alabama Crimson Tide	12–1	SEC champions	Rose Bowl (CFB playoff semifinal)
5	Florida State Seminoles	13–0	ACC champions	Orange Bowl
6	Georgia Bulldogs	12–1	SEC East Division champions	Orange Bowl
7	Ohio State Buckeyes	11–1	Big Ten East Division second place	Cotton Bowl
8	Oregon Ducks	11–2	Pac–12 second place	Fiesta Bowl
9	Missouri Tigers	10–2	SEC East Division second place	Cotton Bowl
10	Penn State Nittany Lions	10–2	Big Ten East Division third place	Peach Bowl
11	Ole Miss Rebels	10–2	SEC West Division second place (tie)	Peach Bowl
12	Oklahoma Sooners	10–2	Big 12 second place (tie)	Alamo Bowl
13	LSU Tigers	9–3	SEC West Division second place (tie)	ReliaQuest Bowl
14	Arizona Wildcats	9–3	Pac–12 third place	Alamo Bowl
15	Louisville Cardinals	10–3	ACC second place	Holiday Bowl
16	Notre Dame Fighting Irish	9–3	Independent	Sun Bowl
17	Iowa Hawkeyes	10–3	Big Ten West Division champions	Citrus Bowl
18	NC State Wolfpack	9–3	ACC third place	Pop-Tarts Bowl
19	Oregon State Beavers	8–4	Pac–12 fourth place (tie)	Sun Bowl
20	Oklahoma State Cowboys	9–4	Big 12 second place (tie)	Texas Bowl
21	Tennessee Volunteers	8–4	SEC East Division third place	Citrus Bowl
22	Clemson Tigers	8–4	ACC sixth place (tie)	Gator Bowl
23	Liberty Flames	13–0	CUSA champions	Fiesta Bowl
24	SMU Mustangs	11–2	AAC champions	Fenway Bowl
25	Kansas State Wildcats	8–4	Big 12 fourth place (tie)	Pop-Tarts Bowl

=== Final rankings ===
Rank	Associated Press	Coaches' Poll
1	Michigan (61)	Michigan (63)
2	Washington	Washington
3	Texas	Georgia
4	Georgia	Texas
5	Alabama	Alabama
6	Oregon	Florida State
7	Florida State	Oregon
8	Missouri	Missouri
9	Ole Miss	Ole Miss
10	Ohio State	Ohio State
11	Arizona	Arizona
12	LSU	LSU
13	Penn State	Penn State
14	Notre Dame	Notre Dame
15	Oklahoma	Oklahoma
16	Oklahoma State	Oklahoma State
17	Tennessee	Tennessee
18	Kansas State	Louisville
19	Louisville	Kansas State
20	Clemson	Clemson
21	NC State	NC State
22	SMU	Iowa
23	Kansas	Kansas
24	Iowa	SMU
25	Liberty	West Virginia

== Postseason ==
There are 41 team-competitive FBS post-season bowl games, with two teams advancing to a 42nd – the CFP National Championship game. Normally, a team is required to have a .500 minimum winning percentage during the regular season to become bowl-eligible (six wins for an 11- or 12-game schedule, and seven wins for a 13-game schedule). If there are not enough winning teams to fulfill all open bowl slots, teams with losing records may be chosen to fill all 82 bowl slots. Additionally, on the rare occasion in which a conference champion does not meet eligibility requirements, they are usually still chosen for bowl games via tie-ins for their conference.

=== Conference summaries ===
Rankings in this section are based on CFP rankings released prior to the games.

Conference	Championship game				Overall Player of the Year/MVP	Offensive Player of the Year	Defensive Player of the Year	Special Teams Player of the Year	Coach of the Year
Conference	Date	Venue (Location)	Matchup	Result	Overall Player of the Year/MVP	Offensive Player of the Year	Defensive Player of the Year	Special Teams Player of the Year	Coach of the Year
ACC	Dec. 2, 2023	Bank of America Stadium (Charlotte, North Carolina)	No. 4 Florida State vs. No. 14 Louisville	Florida State 16–6	Jordan Travis, QB, Florida State	Jordan Travis, QB, Florida State	Payton Wilson, LB, NC State	—N/a	Mike Norvell, Florida State
American	Dec. 2, 2023	Yulman Stadium (New Orleans, Louisiana)	SMU at No. 22 Tulane	SMU 26–14	—N/a	Michael Pratt, QB, Tulane	Trey Moore, LB, UTSA	LaJohntay Wester, WR/RS, Florida Atlantic	Willie Fritz, Tulane
Big Ten	Dec. 2, 2023	Lucas Oil Stadium (Indianapolis, Indiana)	No. 2 Michigan vs. No. 16 Iowa	Michigan 26–0	—N/a	Marvin Harrison Jr., WR, Ohio State	Johnny Newton, DL, Illinois	Dragan Kesich, PK, Minnesota; Tory Taylor, P, Iowa; & Cooper DeJean, RS, Iowa	David Braun, Northwestern (coaches & media)
Big 12	Dec. 2, 2023	AT&T Stadium (Arlington, Texas)	No. 7 Texas vs. No. 18 Oklahoma State	Texas 49–21	—N/a	Ollie Gordon II, RB, Oklahoma State	T'Vondre Sweat, DL, Texas	Austin McNamara, P, Texas Tech	Mike Gundy, Oklahoma State
CUSA	Dec. 1, 2023	Williams Stadium (Lynchburg, Virginia)	New Mexico State at No. 24 Liberty	Liberty 49–35	Kaidon Salter, QB, Liberty	Diego Pavia, QB, New Mexico State	Tyren Dupree, LB, Liberty	Ethan Albertson, PK, New Mexico State	Jamey Chadwell, Liberty; Jerry Kill, New Mexico.
MAC	Dec. 2, 2023	Ford Field (Detroit, Michigan)	Miami (OH) vs. Toledo	Miami (OH) 23–14	—N/a	Peny Boone, RB, Toledo	Matt Salopek, LB, Miami (OH)	Graham Nicholson, PK, Miami (OH)	Jason Candle, Toledo
MW	Dec. 2, 2023	Allegiant Stadium (Paradise, Nevada)	Boise State at UNLV	Boise State 44–20	—N/a	Ashton Jeanty, RB, Boise State	Mohamed Kamara, DE, Colorado State	Jose Pizano, PK, UNLV	Barry Odom, UNLV
Pac-12	Dec. 1, 2023	Allegiant Stadium (Paradise, Nevada)	No. 3 Washington vs. No. 5 Oregon	Washington 34–31	—N/a	Bo Nix, QB, Oregon	Laiatu Latu, DE, UCLA	—N/a	Kalen DeBoer, Washington
SEC	Dec. 2, 2023	Mercedes-Benz Stadium (Atlanta, Georgia)	No. 1 Georgia vs. No. 8 Alabama	Alabama 27–24	—N/a	Jayden Daniels, QB, LSU	Dallas Turner, LB, Alabama	Will Reichard, PK/P, Alabama	Eliah Drinkwitz, Missouri.
Sun Belt	Dec. 2, 2023	Veterans Memorial Stadium (Troy, Alabama)	Appalachian State at Troy	Troy 49–23	Jordan McCloud, QB, James Madison	Kimani Vidal, RB, Troy	Jalen Green, DE, James Madison	—N/a	Curt Cignetti, James Madison

=== Conference champions' bowl games ===
Ranks are per the final CFP rankings, released in December 2023, with win–loss records at that time.

Conference	Champion	W–L	Rank	Bowl game
American	SMU	11–2	24	Fenway Bowl
ACC	Florida State	13–0	5	Orange Bowl
Big Ten	Michigan^{CFP}	13–0	1	Rose Bowl
Big 12	Texas^{CFP}	12–1	3	Sugar Bowl
CUSA	Liberty	13–0	23	Fiesta Bowl
MAC	Miami (OH)	11–2	–	Cure Bowl
Mountain West	Boise State	8–5	–	LA Bowl
Pac-12	Washington^{CFP}	13–0	2	Sugar Bowl
SEC	Alabama^{CFP}	12–1	4	Rose Bowl
Sun Belt	Troy	11–2	–	Birmingham Bowl

^{CFP} College Football Playoff participant

=== Bowl-eligible teams ===
- ACC (11): Boston College, Clemson, Duke, Florida State, Georgia Tech, Louisville, Miami (FL), North Carolina, NC State, Syracuse, Virginia Tech
- American (6): Memphis, Rice, SMU, South Florida, Tulane, UTSA
- Big 10 (9): Iowa, Maryland, Michigan, Minnesota, (Note: Despite having a 5–7 record, Minnesota is bowl-eligible due to having the highest Academic Progress Rate among five-win teams.) Northwestern, Ohio State, Penn State, Rutgers, Wisconsin
- Big 12 (9): Iowa State, Kansas, Kansas State, Oklahoma, Oklahoma State, Texas, Texas Tech, UCF, West Virginia
- C-USA (4): Jacksonville State, (Note: As there were not be enough deserving bowl-eligible teams to fill the available spots, Jacksonville State and James Madison are conditionally bowl-eligible due to their records despite their transitions from FCS.) Liberty, New Mexico State, Western Kentucky
- MAC (6): Bowling Green, Eastern Michigan, Miami (OH), Northern Illinois, Ohio, Toledo
- MW (7): Air Force, Boise State, Fresno State, San Jose State, UNLV, Utah State, Wyoming
- Pac-12 (8): Arizona, California, Oregon, Oregon State, UCLA, USC, Utah, Washington
- SEC (9): Alabama, Auburn, Georgia, Kentucky, LSU, Missouri, Ole Miss, Tennessee, Texas A&M
- Sun Belt (12): Appalachian State, Arkansas State, Coastal Carolina, Georgia Southern, James Madison, Georgia State, Louisiana, Marshall, Old Dominion, South Alabama, Texas State, Troy
- Independent (1): Notre Dame

Number of bowl berths available: 82
Number of bowl-eligible teams: 79
Number of conditional bowl-eligible teams: 2 (Jacksonville State and James Madison)
Number of teams qualified by APR: 1 (Minnesota)

=== Bowl-ineligible teams ===
- ACC (3): Pittsburgh, Virginia, Wake Forest
- American (8): Charlotte, East Carolina, Florida Atlantic, Navy, (Note: Army and Navy both have one game remaining on its schedule, but it is played after the bowl matchups are selected on December 3; Navy has not met the eligibility threshold before then. Since Army has 2 FCS teams on their schedule, they are bowl-ineligible because they have already reached 6 losses and can finish no better than 5–6 in countable games for qualifying as a deserving team.) North Texas, Temple, Tulsa, UAB
- Big 10 (5): Illinois, Indiana, Michigan State, Nebraska, Purdue
- Big 12 (5): Baylor, BYU, Cincinnati, Houston, TCU
- C-USA (5): FIU, Louisiana Tech, Middle Tennessee, Sam Houston, (Note: Sam Houston is bowl-ineligible due to its transition from FCS. Sam Houston has assured itself of a losing season and would be bowl-ineligible regardless.) UTEP
- MAC (6): Akron, Ball State, Buffalo, Central Michigan, Kent State, Western Michigan
- MW (5): Colorado State, Hawaii, Nevada, New Mexico, San Diego State
- Pac-12 (4): Arizona State, (Note: Arizona State has announced a self-imposed 2023 bowl game ban due to recruiting violations from the 2020 season. Arizona State has assured itself of a losing season and would be bowl-ineligible regardless.) Colorado, Stanford, Washington State
- SEC (5): Arkansas, Florida, Mississippi State, South Carolina, Vanderbilt
- Sun Belt (2): Louisiana–Monroe, Southern Miss
- Independent (3): Army, UConn, UMass

Number of bowl-ineligible teams: 51

=== Conference performance in bowl games ===
Division I FBS
Conference	Games	Record			Bowls	
Conference	Games	W	L	Pct.	Won	Lost
ACC	11	5	6	.455	Gasparilla, Birmingham, Military, Fenway, Gator	Boca Raton, Duke's Mayo, Holiday, Pinstripe; Pop-Tarts, Orange
American	6	3	3	.500	Frisco, Boca Raton, Liberty	First Responder, Military, Fenway
Big 12	9	5	4	.556	Independence, Guaranteed Rate, Duke's Mayo; Texas, Pop-Tarts	Gasparilla, Alamo, Liberty, Sugar
Big Ten	10	6	4	.600	Las Vegas, Quick Lane, Pinstripe, Music City, Rose, Championship	Cotton, Peach, ReliaQuest, Citrus
C-USA	4	2	2	.500	New Orleans, Famous Toastery	New Mexico, Fiesta
MAC	6	2	4	.333	Myrtle Beach, Camellia	Cure, 68 Ventures, Quick Lane, Arizona
Mountain West	7	3	4	.429	New Mexico, Armed Forces, Arizona	LA, Famous Idaho Potato, Hawaii, Guaranteed Rate
Pac-12	9	5	4	.556	LA, Holiday, Alamo, Fiesta, Sugar	Independence, Las Vegas, Sun, Championship
SEC	9	5	4	.556	Cotton, Peach, Orange, ReliaQuest, Citrus	Texas, Gator, Music City, Rose
Sun Belt	12	5	7	.417	Cure, Famous Idaho Potato, 68 Ventures, Hawaii, First Responder	Myrtle Beach, New Orleans, Famous Toastery, Frisco, Birmingham, Camellia, Armed Forces
Independent	1	1	0	1.000	Sun	—

Note: The only independent team that played in an FBS bowl game was Notre Dame.

=== College Football Playoff ===
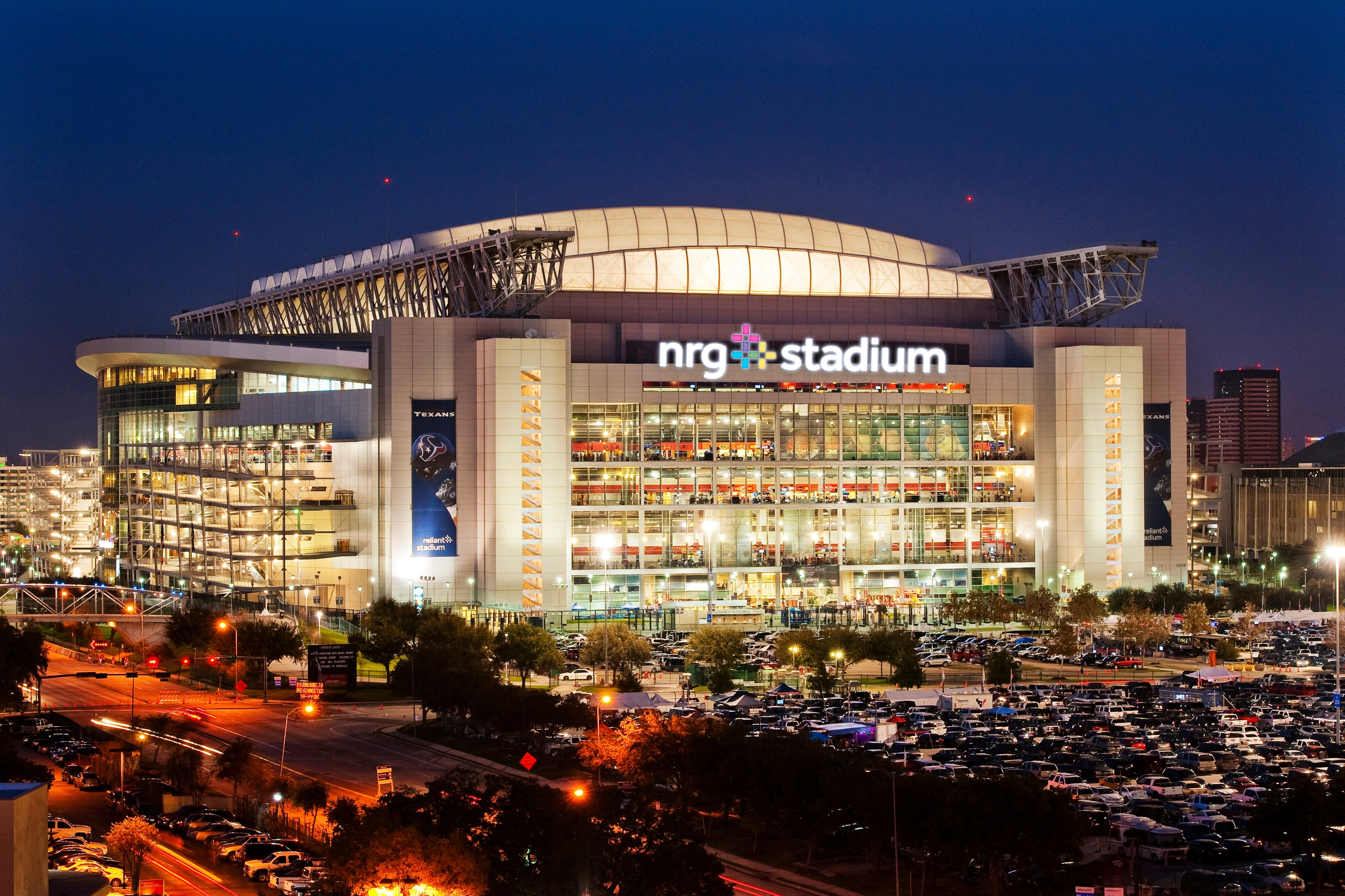
NRG Stadium in Houston, Texas, hosted the championship game.

Semifinals
January 1 – Rose Bowl Rose Bowl Stadium, Pasadena
1	Michigan (OT)	27
4	Alabama	20
January 1 – Sugar Bowl Caesars Superdome, New Orleans
2	Washington	37
3	Texas	31

Championship
January 8 – National Championship NRG Stadium, Houston
1	Michigan	34
2	Washington	13

=== All-star games ===
Each of these games features college seniors, or players whose college football eligibility is ending, who are individually invited by game organizers. These games are scheduled to follow the team-competitive bowls, to allow players selected from bowl teams to participate. The all-star games may include some players from non-FBS programs.

The NFLPA Collegiate Bowl, which debuted in 2012 and was played 12 times through January 2023, was discontinued. The East–West Shrine Bowl relocated from Nevada (where its prior two editions had been played) to Texas.

Date	Time (EST)	Game	Site	Television	Participants	Results	Ref.
Jan. 13	12:00 p.m.	Hula Bowl	FBC Mortgage Stadium; Orlando, Florida	CBS Sports Network	Team Kai; Team Aina	Kai 24; Aina 17	
Jan. 20	11:00 a.m.	Tropical Bowl	Camping World Stadium; Orlando, Florida	Varsity Sports Network	American Team; National Team	American 17; National 17	
Feb. 1	8:00 p.m.	East-West Shrine Bowl	Ford Center at The Star; Frisco, Texas	NFL Network	West Team; East Team	West 26; East 11	
Feb. 3	1:00 p.m.	Senior Bowl	Hancock Whitney Stadium; Mobile, Alabama	NFL Network	National Team; American Team	National 16; American 7	
Feb. 24	4:00 p.m.	HBCU Legacy Bowl	Yulman Stadium; New Orleans, Louisiana	NFL Network	Team Gaither; Team Robinson	Gaither 10; Robinson 6	

== Awards and honors ==
=== Heisman Trophy voting ===
The Heisman Trophy is given to the year's most outstanding player

Player	School	Position	1st	2nd	3rd	Total
Jayden Daniels	LSU	QB	503	217	86	2,029
Michael Penix Jr.	Washington	QB	292	341	143	1,701
Bo Nix	Oregon	QB	51	205	322	885
Marvin Harrison Jr.	Ohio State	WR	20	78	136	352
Jordan Travis	Florida State	QB	8	19	23	85
Jalen Milroe	Alabama	QB	4	8	45	73
Ollie Gordon II	Oklahoma State	RB	1	2	24	31
Cody Schrader	Missouri	RB	1	2	22	29
Blake Corum	Michigan	RB	3	2	15	28
J. J. McCarthy	Michigan	QB	1	7	4	21

=== Other overall ===
Award	Winner	Position	School
AP Player of the Year	Jayden Daniels	QB	LSU
SN Player of the Year	Jayden Daniels	QB	LSU
Walter Camp Award	Jayden Daniels	QB	LSU
Maxwell Award	Michael Penix Jr.	QB	Washington
Lombardi Award	Laiatu Latu	DE	UCLA

=== Special overall ===
Award	Winner	Position	School
Burlsworth Trophy (top player who began as walk-on)	Cody Schrader	RB	Missouri
Paul Hornung Award (most versatile player)	Travis Hunter	WR/CB	Colorado
Jon Cornish Trophy (top Canadian player)	Elic Ayomanor	WR	Stanford
Campbell Trophy ("academic Heisman")	Bo Nix	QB	Oregon
Academic All-American of the Year	Rome Odunze	WR	Washington
Wuerffel Trophy (humanitarian-athlete)	Ladd McConkey	WR	Georgia

=== Offense ===
Quarterback

Award	Winner	School
Davey O'Brien Award	Jayden Daniels	LSU
Johnny Unitas Golden Arm Award	Jayden Daniels	LSU
Manning Award	Jayden Daniels	LSU

Running back

Award	Winner	School
Doak Walker Award	Ollie Gordon II	Oklahoma State

Wide receiver

Award	Winner	School
Fred Biletnikoff Award	Marvin Harrison Jr.	Ohio State

Tight end

Award	Winner	School
John Mackey Award	Brock Bowers	Georgia

Lineman

Award	Winner	Position	School
Rimington Trophy (center)	Jackson Powers-Johnson	C	Oregon
Outland Trophy (interior lineman)	T'Vondre Sweat	DT	Texas
Joe Moore Award	OL (Note: Starting lineup: Left tackle: Troy Fautanu; Left guard: Nate Kalepo; Center: Parker Brailsford; Right guard: Julius Buelow; Right tackle: Roger Rosengarten)		Washington

=== Defense ===
Award	Winner	Position	School
Bronko Nagurski Trophy (defensive player)	Xavier Watts	S	Notre Dame
Chuck Bednarik Award (defensive player)	Payton Wilson	LB	NC State
Lott Trophy (defensive impact)	Junior Colson	LB	Michigan

Defensive front

Award	Winner	School
Dick Butkus Award (linebacker)	Payton Wilson	NC State
Ted Hendricks Award (defensive end)	Laiatu Latu	UCLA

Defensive back

Award	Winner	Position	School
Jim Thorpe Award	Trey Taylor	S	Air Force

=== Special teams ===
Award	Winner	School
Lou Groza Award (placekicker)	Graham Nicholson	Miami (OH)
Ray Guy Award (punter)	Tory Taylor	Iowa
Jet Award (return specialist)	Zachariah Branch	USC
Patrick Mannelly Award (long snapper)	Joe Shimko	NC State

=== Coaches ===
Award	Winner	School
Bobby Dodd Coach of the Year	Mike Norvell	Florida State
Paul "Bear" Bryant Award	Mike Norvell	Florida State
AFCA Coach of the Year	Kalen DeBoer	Washington
AP Coach of the Year	Kalen DeBoer	Washington
Eddie Robinson Coach of the Year	Kalen DeBoer	Washington
Home Depot Coach of the Year	Kalen DeBoer	Washington
Sporting News Coach of the Year	Kalen DeBoer	Washington
Walter Camp Coach of the Year	Kalen DeBoer	Washington
George Munger Award	Kalen DeBoer	Washington

==== Assistants ====
Award	Winner	Coordinator	School
AFCA Assistant Coach of the Year	Phil Parker	Defensive coordinator	Iowa
Broyles Award	Phil Parker	Defensive coordinator	Iowa

=== All-Americans ===
The following players were recognized as consensus All-Americans for 2023. Unanimous selections are followed by an asterisk (*).

2023 Consensus All-Americans
Name	Position	Year	School
Jayden Daniels	Quarterback	Senior	LSU
Ollie Gordon II*	Running back	Sophomore	Oklahoma State
Cody Schrader	Running back	Senior	Missouri
Marvin Harrison Jr.*	Wide receiver	Junior	Ohio State
Malik Nabers*	Wide receiver	Junior	LSU
Rome Odunze	Wide receiver	Junior	Washington
Brock Bowers*	Tight end	Junior	Georgia
Joe Alt*	Offensive line	Junior	Notre Dame
Jackson Powers-Johnson*	Offensive line	Junior	Oregon
Olu Fashanu	Offensive line	Junior	Penn State
Cooper Beebe*	Offensive line	Senior	Kansas State
Zak Zinter*	Offensive line	Senior	Michigan
Jonah Elliss	Defensive line	Junior	Utah
Johnny Newton	Defensive line	Junior	Illinois
Laiatu Latu*	Defensive line	Senior	UCLA
T'Vondre Sweat*	Defensive line	Senior	Texas
Edgerrin Cooper	Linebacker	Junior	Texas A&M
Dallas Turner	Linebacker	Junior	Alabama
Payton Wilson*	Linebacker	Senior	NC State
Beanie Bishop	Defensive back	Senior	West Virginia
Cooper DeJean*	Defensive back	Junior	Iowa
Kool-Aid McKinstry	Defensive back	Junior	Alabama
Malaki Starks	Defensive back	Sophomore	Georgia
Xavier Watts*	Defensive back	Junior	Notre Dame
Graham Nicholson	Kicker	Junior	Miami (OH)
Tory Taylor*	Punter	Senior	Iowa
Travis Hunter	All-Purpose/Return Specialist	Sophomore	Colorado

== Coaching changes ==
=== Preseason and in-season ===
This is restricted to coaching changes taking place on or after May 1, 2023, and will include any changes announced after a team's last regularly scheduled game but before its bowl game. For coaching changes that occurred earlier in 2023, see 2022 NCAA Division I FBS end-of-season coaching changes.

School	Outgoing coach	Date	Reason	Replacement
Northwestern	Pat Fitzgerald	July 10, 2023	Fired	David Braun (named full-time on November 15)
Michigan State	Mel Tucker	September 27, 2023	Fired	Harlon Barnett (interim)
Texas A&M	Jimbo Fisher	November 12, 2023	Fired	Elijah Robinson (interim)
Boise State	Andy Avalos	November 12, 2023	Fired	Spencer Danielson (named full-time on December 3)
Mississippi State	Zach Arnett	November 13, 2023	Fired	Greg Knox (interim)
Syracuse	Dino Babers	November 19, 2023	Fired	Nunzio Campanile (interim)
Oregon State	Jonathan Smith	November 25, 2023	Hired by Michigan State	Kefense Hynson (interim, bowl)
Duke	Mike Elko	November 27, 2023	Hired by Texas A&M	Trooper Taylor (interim, bowl)
James Madison	Curt Cignetti	November 30, 2023	Hired by Indiana	Damian Wroblewski (interim, bowl)
Tulane	Willie Fritz	December 3, 2023	Hired by Houston	Slade Nagle (interim, bowl)
Troy	Jon Sumrall	December 8, 2023	Hired by Tulane	Greg Gasparato (interim, bowl)

=== End of season ===
The list includes coaching changes announced during the season that did not take effect until the end of season.

School	Outgoing coach	Date	Reason	Replacement	Previous position
San Diego State	Brady Hoke	November 13, 2023	Retired (effective at end of season)	Sean Lewis	Colorado offensive coordinator and quarterbacks coach
Michigan State	Harlon Barnett (interim)	November 25, 2023	Hired as Defensive Backs Coach by Northwestern	Jonathan Smith	Oregon State head coach
New Mexico	Danny Gonzales	November 25, 2023	Fired	Bronco Mendenhall	Virginia head coach
Indiana	Tom Allen	November 26, 2023	Hired As Defensive Coordinator/Linebackers Coach by Penn State	Curt Cignetti	James Madison head coach
Houston	Dana Holgorsen	November 26, 2023	Fired	Willie Fritz	Tulane head coach
UTEP	Dana Dimel	November 26, 2023	Fired	Scotty Walden	Austin Peay head coach
Louisiana–Monroe	Terry Bowden	November 26, 2023	Fired	Bryant Vincent	New Mexico offensive coordinator
Mississippi State	Greg Knox (interim)	November 26, 2023	Permanent replacement	Jeff Lebby	Oklahoma offensive coordinator and quarterbacks coach
Texas A&M	Elijah Robinson (interim)	November 27, 2023	Hired as Defensive Coordinator By Syracuse	Mike Elko	Duke head coach
Middle Tennessee	Rick Stockstill	November 27, 2023	Fired	Derek Mason	Oklahoma State defensive coordinator
Syracuse	Nunzio Campanile (interim)	November 28, 2023	Permanent replacement	Fran Brown	Georgia defensive backs coach
Oregon State	Kefense Hynson (interim)	November 28, 2023	Permanent replacement	Trent Bray	Oregon State defensive coordinator and linebackers coach
Nevada	Ken Wilson	December 1, 2023	Fired	Jeff Choate	Texas co-defensive coordinator and inside linebackers coach
Wyoming	Craig Bohl	December 6, 2023	Retired (effective at end of season)	Jay Sawvel	Wyoming defensive coordinator and safeties coach
James Madison	Damian Wroblewski (interim)	December 7, 2023	Hired as Assistant Offensive Line Coach by Maryland	Bob Chesney	Holy Cross head coach
Duke	Trooper Taylor (interim)	December 7, 2023	Hired as Associate Head Coach/Running Backs Coach by Texas A&M	Manny Diaz	Penn State defensive coordinator
Tulane	Slade Nagle (interim)	December 8, 2023	Hired as Special teams/Tight Ends Coach by LSU	Jon Sumrall	Troy head coach
Troy	Greg Gasparato (interim)	December 18, 2023	Hired as Defensive Coordinator by Tulane	Gerad Parker	Notre Dame offensive coordinator and tight ends coach
New Mexico State	Jerry Kill	December 23, 2023	Hired as Consultant by Vanderbilt	Tony Sanchez	New Mexico State wide receivers coach
Alabama	Nick Saban	January 10, 2024	Retired	Kalen DeBoer	Washington head coach
Washington	Kalen DeBoer	January 12, 2024	Hired by Alabama	Jedd Fisch	Arizona head coach
Arizona	Jedd Fisch	January 14, 2024	Hired by Washington	Brent Brennan	San Jose State head coach
South Alabama	Kane Wommack	January 15, 2024	Hired as co-defensive coordinator by Alabama	Major Applewhite	South Alabama offensive coordinator and quarterbacks coach
San Jose State	Brent Brennan	January 16, 2024	Hired by Arizona	Ken Niumatalolo	UCLA tight ends coach
Buffalo	Maurice Linguist	January 16, 2024	Hired as co-defensive coordinator by Alabama	Pete Lembo	South Carolina associate head coach and special teams coordinator
Michigan	Jim Harbaugh	January 24, 2024	Hired by Los Angeles Chargers	Sherrone Moore	Michigan offensive coordinator and offensive line coach
Boston College	Jeff Hafley	January 31, 2024	Hired as defensive coordinator by Green Bay Packers	Bill O'Brien	New England Patriots offensive coordinator and quarterbacks coach
UCLA	Chip Kelly	February 9, 2024	Hired as offensive coordinator by Ohio State	DeShaun Foster	UCLA running backs coach
Georgia State	Shawn Elliott	February 15, 2024	Hired as tight ends coach by South Carolina	Dell McGee	Georgia running backs coach

== Television viewers and ratings ==
=== Top 10 most watched regular season games ===
All times Eastern. Rankings are from the AP Poll (before 10/31) and CFP Rankings (thereafter).

Rank	Date	Time	Matchup				Network	Viewers (millions)	TV ratings	Significance
1	November 25	12:00 p.m.	No. 2 Ohio State	24	No. 3 Michigan	30	Fox	19.07	9.0	The Game, College GameDay, Big Noon Kickoff
2	September 23	3:30 p.m.	No. 19 Colorado	6	No. 10 Oregon	42	ABC	10.03	5.2	
3	September 23	7:30 p.m.	No. 6 Ohio State	17	No. 9 Notre Dame	14	NBC	9.98	5.1	College GameDay
4	October 21	12:00 p.m.	No. 7 Penn State	12	No. 3 Ohio State	20	Fox	9.96	5.3	College GameDay, Big Noon Kickoff, rivalry
5	September 16	10:00 p.m.	Colorado State	35	No. 18 Colorado	43	ESPN	9.30	4.9	College GameDay, Big Noon Kickoff, Rocky Mountain Showdown
6	September 3	7:30 p.m.	No. 5 LSU	24	No. 8 Florida State	45	ABC	9.17	4.7	Camping World Kickoff
7	November 11	12:00 p.m.	No. 3 Michigan	24	No. 10 Penn State	15	Fox	9.16	5.0	Big Noon Kickoff, rivalry
8	November 25	3:30 p.m.	No. 8 Alabama	27	Auburn	24	CBS	9.09	4.3	Iron Bowl, SEC Nation
9	November 4	7:45 p.m.	No. 14 LSU	28	No. 8 Alabama	42	CBS	8.82	4.6	College GameDay, rivalry
10	September 9	7:00 p.m.	No. 11 Texas	34	No. 3 Alabama	24	ESPN/ESPN2	8.76	4.5	Allstate Crossbar Classic, College GameDay

=== Conference championship games ===
All times Eastern. Rankings are from the CFP Rankings.

Rank	Date	Time	Matchup				Network	Viewers (millions)	TV ratings	Conference	Location
1	December 2	4:00 p.m.	No. 8 Alabama	27	No. 1 Georgia	24	CBS	17.52	8.9	SEC	Mercedes-Benz Stadium, Atlanta, GA
2	December 2	8:00 p.m.	No. 2 Michigan	26	No. 16 Iowa	0	Fox	10.02	5.1	Big Ten	Lucas Oil Stadium, Indianapolis, IN
3	December 1	8:00 p.m.	No. 5 Oregon	31	No. 3 Washington	34	ABC	9.25	4.9	Pac-12	Allegiant Stadium, Las Vegas, NV
4	December 2	12:00 p.m.	No. 18 Oklahoma State	21	No. 7 Texas	49	ABC	7.89	4.4	Big 12	AT&T Stadium, Arlington, TX
5	December 2	8:00 p.m.	No. 14 Louisville	6	No. 4 Florida State	16	ABC	7.03	3.8	ACC	Bank of America Stadium, Charlotte, NC
6	December 2	4:00 p.m.	SMU	26	No. 22 Tulane	14	ABC	1.88	1.0	AAC	Yulman Stadium, New Orleans, LA
7	December 2	12:00 p.m.	Miami (OH)	23	Toledo	14	ESPN	1.29	0.8	MAC	Ford Field, Detroit, MI
8	December 2	3:00 p.m.	Boise State	45	UNLV	10	Fox	1.26	0.7	MW	Allegiant Stadium, Las Vegas, NV
9	December 2	4:00 p.m.	Appalachian State	23	Troy	49	ESPN	0.372	0.2	Sun Belt	Veterans Memorial Stadium, Troy, AL
—N/a	December 1	7:00 p.m.	New Mexico State	35	No. 24 Liberty	49	CBSSN	n.a. (Note: Viewership and ratings are not available for CBSSN because it is not Nielsen rated)	n.a.	C-USA	Williams Stadium, Lynchburg, VA

=== Most watched non-CFP bowl games ===
Rank	Date	Time	Matchup				Network	Viewers (millions)	TV ratings	Game	Location
1	January 1, 2024	1:00 p.m.	No. 21 Tennessee	35	Iowa	0	ABC	6.79	3.5	Citrus	Camping World Stadium, Orlando, FL
2	January 1, 2024	12:00 p.m.	No. 13 LSU	35	Wisconsin	31	ESPN2	4.61	2.4	ReliaQuest	Raymond James Stadium, Tampa, FL
3	December 28	5:45 p.m.	Kansas State	28	No. 19 NC State	14	ESPN	4.31	2.3	Pop-Tarts	Camping World Stadium, Orlando, FL
4	December 28	9:15 p.m.	No. 14 Arizona	38	Oklahoma	24	ESPN	3.93	2.2	Alamo	Alamodome, San Antonio, TX
5	December 27	5:30 p.m.	West Virginia	30	North Carolina	10	ESPN	3.84	2.0	Mayo	Bank of America Stadium, Charlotte, NC
6	December 29	3:30 p.m.	Memphis	36	Iowa State	26	ESPN	3.60	1.9	Liberty	Simmons Bank Liberty Stadium, Memphis, TN
7	December 27	8:00 p.m.	USC	42	No. 16 Louisville	28	FOX	3.51	1.9	Holiday	Petco Park, San Diego, CA
8	December 29	12:00 p.m.	Clemson	38	Kentucky	35	ESPN	3.43	1.9	Gator	EverBank Stadium, Jacksonville, FL
9	December 29	2:00 p.m.	No. 16 Notre Dame	40	No. 19 Oregon State	8	CBS	3.26	1.8	Sun	Sun Bowl, El Paso, TX
10	December 23	7:30 p.m.	Northwestern	14	Utah	7	ABC	3.09	1.7	Las Vegas	Allegiant Stadium, Paradise, NV

=== New Year's Six and College Football Playoff games ===
Rank	Date	Time (ET)	Matchup				Network(s)	Viewers (millions)	TV ratings	Game	Location
1	January 1, 2024	5:00 p.m.	No. 1 Michigan	27	No. 4 Alabama	20	ESPN	27.76	13.0	Rose Bowl (CFP Semifinal)	Rose Bowl, Pasadena, CA
2	January 8, 2024	7:30 p.m.	No. 2 Washington	13	No. 1 Michigan	34	ESPN	25.05	12.3	CFP National Championship	NRG Stadium, Houston, TX
3	January 1, 2024	8:45 p.m.	No. 2 Washington	37	No. 3 Texas	31	ESPN	18.77	9.3	Sugar Bowl (CFP Semifinal)	Caesars Superdome, New Orleans, LA
4	December 30, 2023	4:00 p.m.	No. 5 Florida State	3	No. 6 Georgia	63	ESPN	10.39	5.2	Orange Bowl (NY6)	Hard Rock Stadium, Miami Gardens, FL
5	December 29, 2023	8:00 p.m.	No. 7 Ohio State	3	No. 9 Missouri	14	ESPN	9.72	4.9	Cotton Bowl (NY6)	AT&T Stadium, Arlington, TX
6	December 30, 2023	12:00 p.m.	No. 11 Ole Miss	38	No. 10 Penn State	25	ESPN	7.77	4.3	Peach Bowl (NY6)	Mercedes-Benz Stadium, Atlanta, GA
7	January 1, 2024	1:00 p.m.	No. 23 Liberty	6	No. 8 Oregon	45	ESPN	4.59	2.4	Fiesta Bowl (NY6)	State Farm Stadium, Glendale, AZ

== Television changes ==
This is the first year of television deals for the Big Ten Conference and Conference USA. The Big Ten's deal includes CBS, NBC/Peacock, Fox/FS1 and the Big Ten Network. Conference USA's deal includes ESPN and CBS Sports Network. Due to the bankruptcy of Diamond Sports Group, starting this season, a package of ACC games produced by Raycom Sports that were previously aired on Bally Sports moved to The CW. The CW also acquired the rights to air the Barstool Sports produced broadcast of the Arizona Bowl. Locally, Fresno State reached an agreement with TelevisaUnivision stations KTFF-DT and KBTF-CD to air the first ever exclusively Spanish-language television broadcast in FBS history on September 9. This is also the final year of television deals for the Pac-12 Conference and the SEC. The SEC has signed a new deal with ESPN and the SEC Network, making 2023 the final year of the SEC on CBS. The Pac-12, with only two members, would announce an agreement with The CW and Fox Sports.

Noah Eagle, formerly at Fox Sports, and Todd Blackledge, formerly at ESPN, joined NBC Sports in 2023 as the lead commentary team on Big Ten Saturday Night. Greg McElroy replaced Blackledge as ESPN's #2 college football color commentator. Derek Mason and Orlando Franklin also joined ESPN as color commentators. Jeff Levering replaced Eagle at Fox Sports, while Mark Ingram II replaced Reggie Bush on Fox's Big Noon Kickoff.

In November 2023, ESPN International reached agreements with Sky Sports NFL to carry packages of games and studio programs in college football and basketball (replacing TNT Sports, which had previously held rights to ESPN International content).

== Attendances ==
#	College football team	Average attendance
1	Michigan Wolverines	109,971
2	Penn State Nittany Lions	108,409
3	Ohio State Buckeyes	103,792
4	Tennessee Volunteers	101,915
5	Texas Longhorns	101,625
6	LSU Tigers	100,742
7	Alabama Crimson Tide	100,077
8	Texas A&M Aggies	99,234
9	Georgia Bulldogs	92,746
10	Florida Gators	89,587
11	Auburn Tigers	88,043
12	Nebraska Cornhuskers	86,802
13	Oklahoma Sooners	83,741
14	Clemson Tigers	81,334
15	Florida State Seminoles	78,711
16	South Carolina Gamecocks	77,833
17	Notre Dame Fighting Irish	77,622
18	Wisconsin Badgers	75,391
19	Michigan State Spartans	70,211
20	Iowa Hawkeyes	69,250
21	Washington Huskies	68,814
22	USC Trojans	66,071
23	Arkansas Razorbacks	65,317
24	Virginia Tech Hokies	64,733
25	Ole Miss Rebels	63,721
26	BYU Cougars	61,944
27	Kentucky Wildcats	60,939
28	Iowa State Cyclones	60,384
29	Missouri Tigers	60,169
30	Purdue Boilermakers	58,248
31	NC State Wolfpack	56,919
32	Oregon Ducks	55,895
33	Texas Tech Red Raiders	54,491
34	Mississippi State Bulldogs	54,455
35	Oklahoma State Cowboys	53,891
36	Colorado Buffaloes	53,180
37	Utah Utes	52,499
38	Kansas State Wildcats	51,957
39	Louisville Cardinals	51,252
40	West Virginia Mountaineers	51,156
41	North Carolina Tar Heels	50,095
42	Miami Hurricanes	49,714
43	Illinois Fighting Illini	49,698
44	Rutgers Scarlet Knights	49,251
45	Minnesota Golden Gophers	48,453
46	Arizona State Sun Devils	48,301
47	Pittsburgh Panthers	48,122
48	UCLA Bruins	47,951
49	TCU Horned Frogs	47,331
50	Arizona Wildcats	47,320
51	Kansas Jayhawks	45,888
52	Indiana Hoosiers	46,906
53	UCF Knights	44,015
54	Baylor Bears	43,388
55	Virginia Cavaliers	43,293
56	Maryland Terrapins	40,314
57	Fresno State Bulldogs	39,969
58	California Golden Bears	38,684
59	Cincinnati Bearcats	38,193
60	South Florida Bulls	37,944
61	Oregon State Beavers	36,969
62	Boston College Eagles	36,376
63	Georgia Tech Yellow Jackets	36,290
64	Houston Cougars	36,020
65	Boise State Broncos	35,867
66	East Carolina Pirates	35,115
67	Appalachian State Mountaineers	34,734
68	Syracuse Orange	34,045
69	Stanford Cardinal	33,219
70	Navy Midshipmen	30,804
71	Wake Forest Demon Deacons	30,609
72	Memphis Tigers	29,782
73	Air Force Falcons	29,616
74	Army Black Knights	29,016
75	UTSA Roadrunners	28,876
76	Washington State Cougars	28,023
77	Troy Trojans	27,121
78	Colorado State Rams	26,509
79	Vanderbilt Commodores	25,509
80	James Madison Dukes	25,372
81	Duke Blue Devils	25,111
82	Tulane Green Wave	25,021
83	San Diego State Aztecs	24,832
84	Connecticut Huskies	24,659
85	UNLV Rebels	23,661
86	Southern Miss Golden Eagles	23,275
87	Marshall Thundering Herd	23,198
88	Wyoming Cowboys	23,163
89	SMU Mustangs	22,616
90	UAB Blazers	21,543
91	Georgia Southern Eagles	21,543
92	Texas State Bobcats	21,543
93	Northwestern Wildcats	20,800
94	Rice Owls	20,542
95	Tulsa Golden Hurricane	20,187
96	Jacksonville State Gamecocks	20,033
97	Toledo Rockets	19,675
98	Utah State Aggies	19,282
99	Ohio Bobcats	19,005
100	Liberty Flames	18,911
101	Florida Atlantic Owls	18,603
102	UTEP Miners	18,160
103	Old Dominion Monarchs	17,847
104	North Texas Mean Green	17,761
105	Western Michigan Broncos	17,619
106	South Alabama Jaguars	17,190
107	Coastal Carolina Chanticleers	17,120
108	Nevada Wolf Pack	16,998
109	Eastern Michigan Eagles	16,882
110	San Jose State Spartans	16,804
111	Arkansas State Red Wolves	16,747
112	Louisiana Ragin' Cajuns	16,664
113	Central Michigan Chippewas	16,350
114	New Mexico Lobos	15,982
115	Louisiana Tech Bulldogs	15,796
116	Western Kentucky Hilltoppers	15,710
117	Georgia State Panthers	15,594
118	FIU Panthers	15,290
119	New Mexico State Aggies	14,847
120	Louisiana-Monroe Warhawks	14,296
121	Bowling Green Falcons	13,462
122	Temple Owls	13,446
123	Miami RedHawks	13,395
124	Middle Tennessee Blue Raiders	13,219
125	Buffalo Bulls	13,142
126	Charlotte 49ers	12,471
127	Hawai'i Rainbow Warriors	11,251
128	Ball State Cardinals	10,771
129	Massachusetts Minutemen	10,598
130	Kent State Golden Flashes	9,511
131	Northern Illinois Huskies	9,456
132	Sam Houston Bearkats	8,298
133	Akron Zips	7,237

== See also ==
- 2023 NCAA Division I FCS football season
- 2023 NCAA Division II football season
- 2023 NCAA Division III football season
- 2023 NAIA football season
- 2023 U Sports football season
- 2023 junior college football season
