= Curt Cignetti =

American football coach (born 1961)

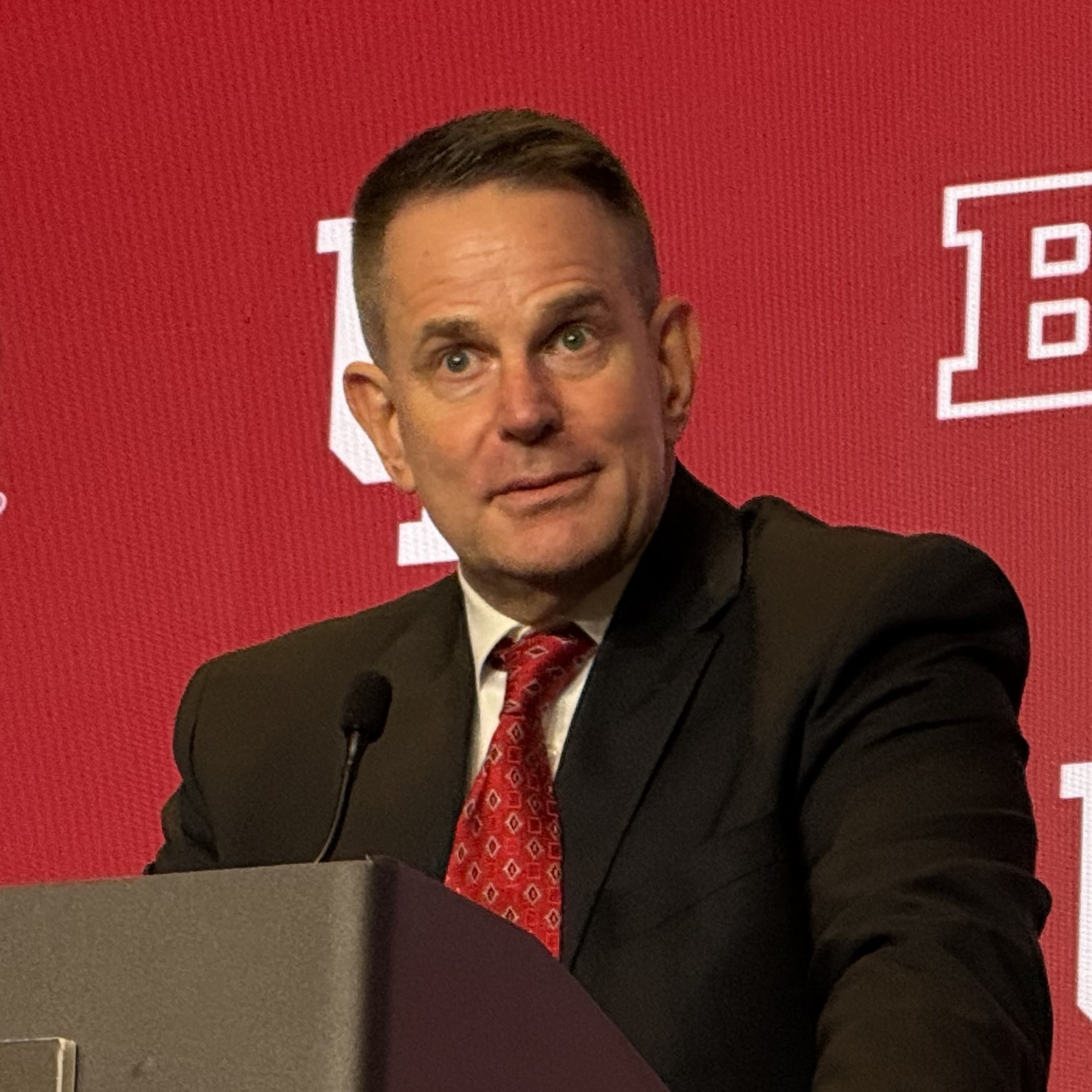
- Cignetti at 2026 Big Ten Media Day

Current position
- Title: Head coach
- Team: Indiana
- Conference: Big Ten
- Record: 36–4
- Annual salary: $13.2 million

Biographical details
- Born: June 2, 1961 (age 65); Pittsburgh, Pennsylvania, U.S.
- Height: 6 ft 3 in (191 cm)

Playing career
- 1979–1982: West Virginia
- Position: Quarterback

Coaching career (HC unless noted)
- 1983–1984: Pittsburgh (GA)
- 1985: Davidson (QB/WR)
- 1986–1988: Rice (QB)
- 1989–1992: Temple (QB)
- 1993–1999: Pittsburgh (QB/TE)
- 2000–2006: NC State (QB/TE/RC)
- 2007–2010: Alabama (WR/RC)
- 2011–2016: IUP
- 2017–2018: Elon
- 2019–2023: James Madison
- 2024–present: Indiana

Head coaching record
- Overall: 155–39
- Bowls: 3–1
- Tournaments: 3–1 (CFP); 7–5 (NCAA D-I playoffs); 4–3 (NCAA D-II playoffs)

Accomplishments and honors

Championships
- National (2025); PSAC (2012); 3 CAA (2019–2021); Big Ten (2025); 2 PSAC West Division (2012, 2015); CAA South Division (2020); 2 Sun Belt East Division (2022, 2023) (Note: James Madison was not eligible for their conference title or postseason play in their first two years of FBS transition while members of the Sun Belt Conference. They had the best record in the SBC East Division in 2022 and tied for the best record in 2023, but weren't allowed to play in the conference championship game.)

Awards
- 2× AP Coach of the Year (2024, 2025); 2× AFCA Coach of the Year (2024, 2025); Bobby Dodd Coach of the Year (2025); Paul "Bear" Bryant Coach of the Year (2025); Eddie Robinson Coach of the Year (2024); George Munger Award (2025); 2× Home Depot Coach of the Year (2024, 2025); 2× Sporting News Coach of the Year (2024, 2025); 2× Walter Camp Coach of the Year (2024, 2025); 2× Big Ten Coach of the Year (2024, 2025); Sun Belt Coach of the Year (2023); PSAC Coach of the Year (2012); CAA Coach of the Year (2017)

Curtis John Cignetti (/kɜːrt sɪɡˈnɛti/ born June 2, 1961) is an American college football coach who is the head football coach at Indiana University Bloomington. He previously served as the head coach at Indiana University of Pennsylvania (IUP) from 2011 to 2016, Elon University from 2017 to 2018, and James Madison University from 2019 to 2023.

Cignetti is a five-time conference coach of the year and a two-time national coach of the year. He is the only college football coach to have started 10–0 with two different teams in consecutive seasons, achieving this unique distinction with James Madison University in 2023 and Indiana University in 2024. During his first season at Indiana, he was named the Big Ten Coach of the Year after leading the Hoosiers to a program-record 11 wins and their first-ever College Football Playoff berth.

In 2025, he repeated as Big Ten Coach of the Year as Indiana completed the first 12–0 regular season in school history and won their first Big Ten Conference title since 1967 and the first outright title since 1945. In the national championship game, Cignetti led the Hoosiers to their first national championship in program history. With this championship win, the Hoosiers became the first FBS team to compile a perfect 16-win season since the 1894 Yale Bulldogs.

Cignetti's tenure at Indiana, having turned the losingest program in college football history into national champions, has been regarded as one of the greatest turnarounds in the history of college football, with some arguing it as one of the greatest in the history of American sports.

== Early life and playing career ==
Born in Pittsburgh, Pennsylvania, Cignetti is the son of hall of fame coach Frank Cignetti Sr. (1937–2022), the head coach for four seasons (1976–1979) at West Virginia University in Morgantown, promoted after six seasons as an assistant under previous head coach Bobby Bowden. After graduation from Morgantown High School in 1979, Cignetti stayed in town and was a quarterback for the West Virginia Mountaineers from 1979 to 1982. behind starters Oliver Luck and Jeff Hostetler.

== Assistant coaching career ==
After graduating from West Virginia, Cignetti began his coaching career as a graduate assistant at Pitt in 1983 under Foge Fazio. He has also coached at Davidson College, Rice University, and Temple University.

In 2000, Cignetti joined Chuck Amato's staff at North Carolina State University (NC State). During his tenure, the Wolfpack achieved significant success, including a school-record 11-win season in 2002. In 2003, he coached quarterback Philip Rivers, who earned ACC Player of the Year honors. Over seven seasons, NC State participated in five bowl games, securing victories in four. Notably, in 2006, Cignetti recruited future Super Bowl champion quarterback Russell Wilson to the Wolfpack.

In 2007, Cignetti became part of Nick Saban's inaugural coaching staff at the University of Alabama, serving as wide receivers coach and recruiting coordinator. During Cignetti's time under Saban at Alabama, the Crimson Tide achieved remarkable success, including a 12–0 regular season in 2008 and a 14–0 national championship season in 2009. During this period, Alabama won 29 consecutive regular-season games. Cignetti played a pivotal role in recruiting and developing key players, such as wide receiver Julio Jones, Heisman Trophy winner Mark Ingram II, and linebacker Dont'a Hightower. The 2008 recruiting class featured six future first-round NFL draft selections.

== Head coaching career ==
=== IUP (2011–2016) ===
When Curt Cignetti became head coach at IUP in 2011, the program was coming off a 4–10 conference record in the previous two seasons. In his first season, he revitalized the team, which won six of its final seven games by an average margin of 28 points, finishing 7–3. The following year, IUP won the Pennsylvania State Athletic Conference (PSAC) title and advanced to the NCAA Regional Finals, ending the season 12–2. In 2013, Cignetti’s team posted a 9–2 record, and he guided IUP to NCAA playoff appearances in both 2015 and 2016. His 2016 team finished 10–2. Across six seasons, Cignetti compiled a 53–17 record at IUP, with three NCAA playoff appearances and two conference championships. On December 31, 2016, he accepted the head coaching position at Elon University.

=== Elon (2017–2018) ===
At Elon, Cignetti inherited a program with a 4–20 conference record and six consecutive losing seasons. In his first year, the Phoenix turned their fortunes around, winning eight straight games after an opening loss to MAC champion Toledo. The team was ranked as high as sixth nationally and competed against James Madison for the conference championship, earning their first NCAA Playoff berth since 2009. For this turnaround, Cignetti was named Colonial Athletic Association (CAA) Coach of the Year and was a finalist for the Eddie Robinson National Coach of the Year award. In 2018, Cignetti led Elon to a historic 27–24 victory over James Madison, snapping JMU's 22-game CAA winning streak and 19-game home winning streak. This marked Elon’s first win over a top-five FCS opponent and helped the team secure back-to-back NCAA playoff appearances for the first time in program history.

=== James Madison (2019–2023) ===
Cignetti was named head coach at James Madison on December 14, 2018, guiding the Dukes to a 14–2 record in his first season. Cignetti's Dukes made an appearance in the FCS National Championship game, ultimately falling to North Dakota State in the title matchup. In the pandemic-affected 2020 season, shortened and delayed to spring 2021, JMU finished 7–1 and reached the FCS Semifinals. The 2021 season saw further success, as the Dukes finished 12–2 and announced their move from the Colonial Athletic Association (CAA) to the Sun Belt Conference. In their first season at the FBS level in 2022, JMU made a seamless transition, finishing 8–3 and earning a share of the Sun Belt East Division title.

=== Indiana (2024–present) ===
==== 2024 season ====
Cignetti was named head football coach at Indiana University on November 30, 2023, to replace the recently dismissed Tom Allen. Shortly after his hiring, he drew media attention for his confident remark, telling reporters, "It's simple, I win. Google me," when asked how he was selling his vision for the program to recruits and transfers. Cignetti guided the Hoosiers to a 10–0 start, the best in Indiana football history. The Hoosiers achieved their first-ever 11-win season, earning the team national recognition, a top-five ranking, and a College Football Playoff berth. Indiana finished the season ranked No. 10 with an 11–2 record, their season ended with a loss to Notre Dame in the first round of the 2024–25 College Football Playoff.

Indiana extended Cignetti during his first season with a new eight-year contract. The deal doubled his salary to $8 million annually and included commitments to upgrade the football program, such as stadium enhancements and increased athlete and staff compensation.

==== 2025 season ====
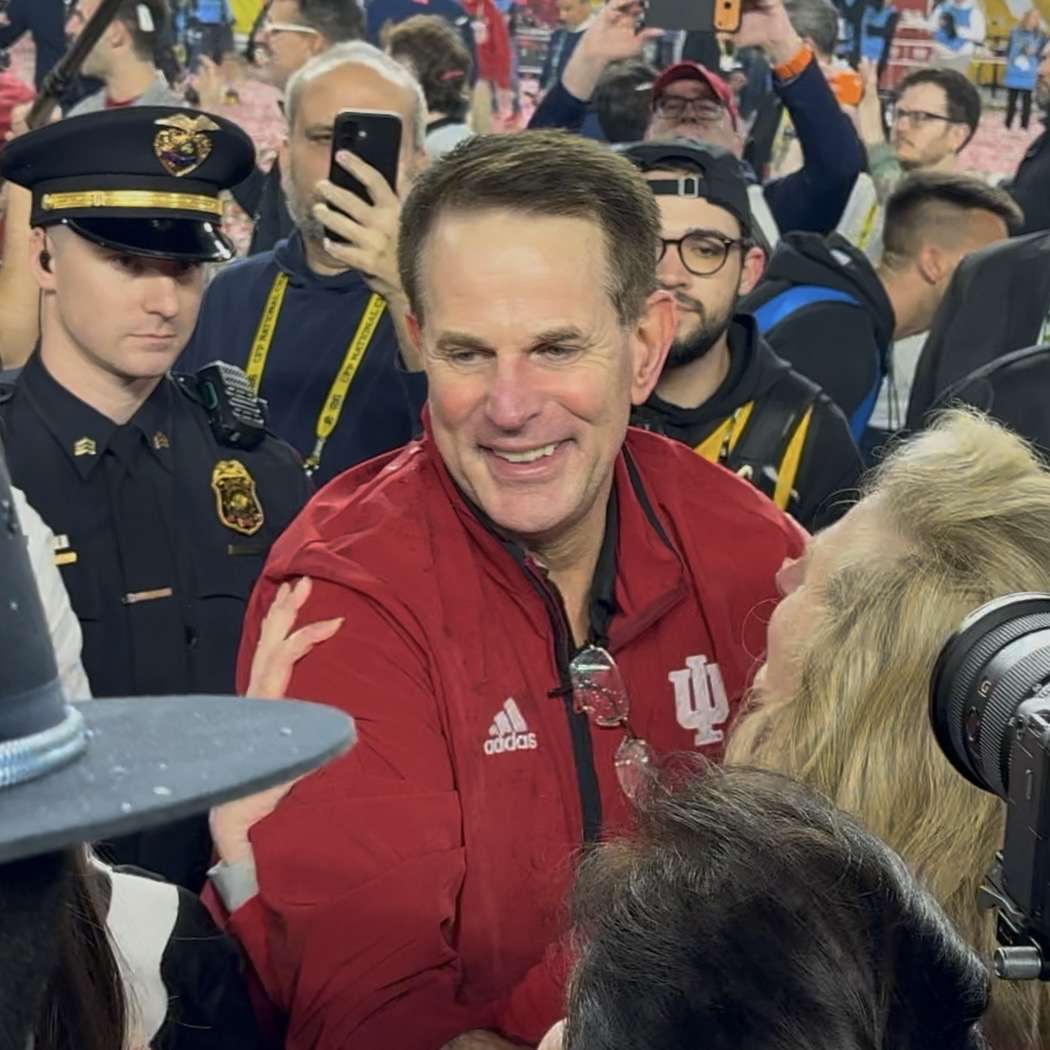
Cignetti celebrates on the field of Hard Rock Stadium after winning the national championship in 2026.

Indiana was ranked No. 20 by the AP to open the season. After starting 5–0 and rising to No. 7, the Hoosiers defeated No. 3 Oregon, 30–20 at Autzen Stadium. This marked Indiana's first win against a top-five team on the road, and their second-ever win against a top-five team, the first since defeating Purdue in 1967. Following the win, Indiana rose to No. 3 in the AP poll, the highest in program history. A week later, they surpassed that mark after improving to 7–0 and rising to No. 2 in the AP Poll. The Hoosiers ended the regular season with a dominant 56–3 win over rival Purdue, a 12–0 record, and a No. 2 ranking in the AP poll. On December 6, the Hoosiers played the defending national champions and No. 1 ranked Ohio State in the 2025 Big Ten Football Championship Game. The Hoosiers upset the Buckeyes, 13–10, marking Indiana's first win against Ohio State since 1988. On December 7, the 13–0 Hoosiers were ranked No. 1 in the AP Top 25 poll for the first time in program history, and earned the No. 1 seed in the College Football Playoff, another school first. The Hoosiers then defeated Alabama in the 2026 Rose Bowl by a score of 38–3 before subsequently defeating Oregon for a second time during the season in the 2026 Peach Bowl by a score of 56–22, leading the Hoosiers to the 2026 College Football Playoff National Championship, their first ever national championship appearance. Indiana would go on to defeat the No. 10 seed Miami Hurricanes by a score of 27–21 at Hard Rock Stadium to win their first national championship, subsequently becoming the first FBS team to compile a perfect 16–0 season since the 1894 Yale Bulldogs.

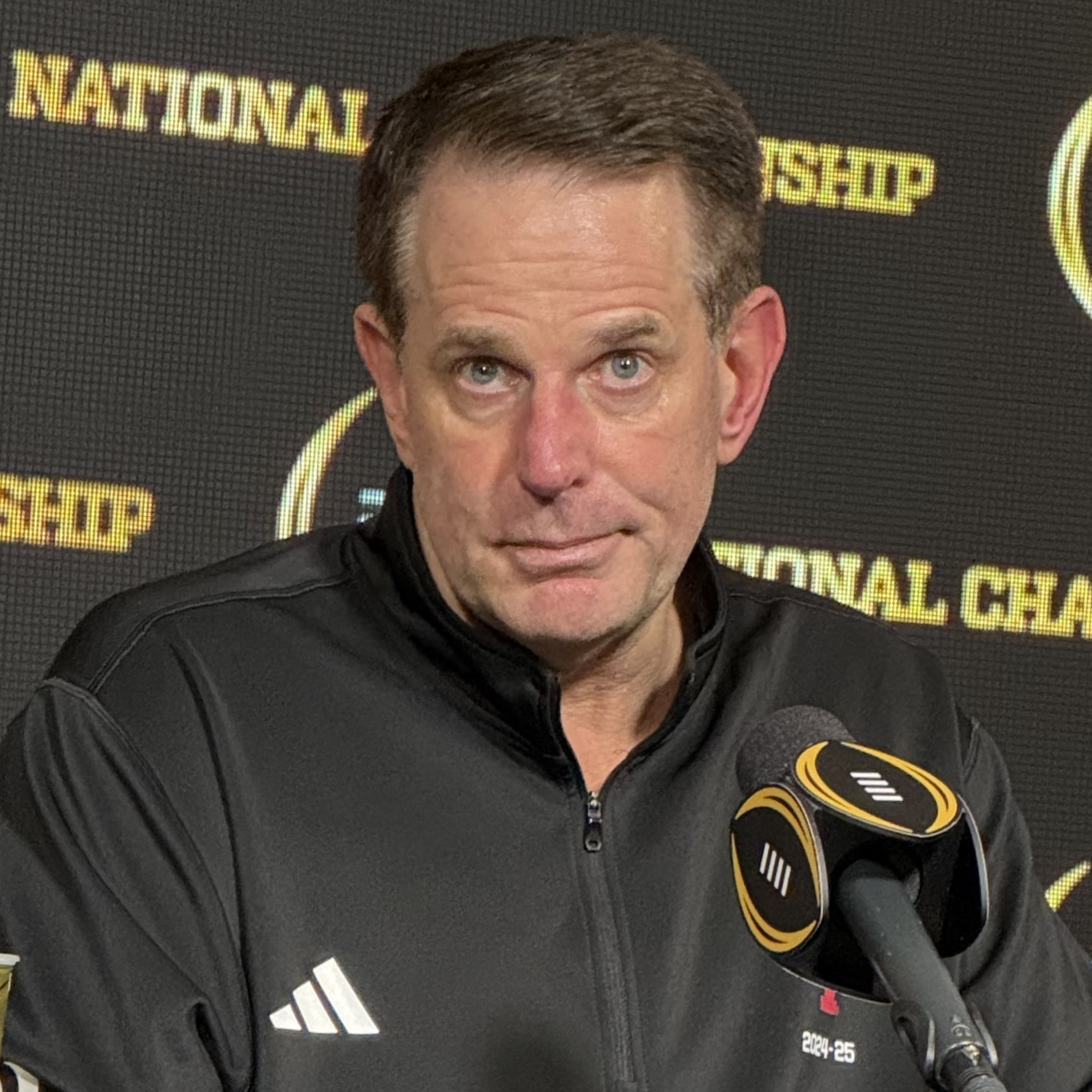
Cignetti at the post-game press conference in Hard Rock Stadium after the 2026 College Football Playoff National Championship versus the Miami Hurricanes.

On October 16, 2025, Cignetti and Indiana signed an eight-year, $93 million contract extension. Following the regular season, Cignetti was named Big Ten Coach of the Year for the second consecutive year, sweeping both the Hayes–Schembechler Award (coaches) and the Dave McClain Award (media).

=== Major achievements and program turnarounds ===
At James Madison, Cignetti guided the Dukes’ transition from the Football Championship Subdivision (FCS) to the Football Bowl Subdivision (FBS), posting a 52–9 record from 2019 to 2023 and winning three conference titles.

In 2024, his first season at Indiana, the Hoosiers won a then-school record 11 games, secured the program’s first College Football Playoff berth and second-ever appearance in a major bowl or its equivalent. They finished ranked No. 10 in the Associated Press poll, while Cignetti was named Big Ten Coach of the Year.

Cignetti (right) during Indiana's visit to the White House in 2026

In 2025, his second season at Indiana, the Hoosiers won their first-ever national championship and became the first FBS team to achieve a 16–0 season in NCAA history. Cignetti was awarded as the Paul "Bear" Bryant National Coach of the Year.

== Personal life ==
Cignetti is of Italian descent. He and his wife, Manette, have three children, Curt Jr., Carly Ann, and Natalie Elise. His brother, Frank Jr., is a senior offensive assistant for the Pittsburgh Steelers, and previously served as offensive coordinator at Pitt, Indiana University of Pennsylvania, and several other schools. His father, Frank Sr., coached for the West Virginia Mountaineers from 1976 to 1979, and served as coach of Indiana University of Pennsylvania from 1980 to 2005.

== Head coaching record ==
Year	Team	Overall	Conference	Standing	Bowl/playoffs	Coaches^{#}	AP^{°}
IUP Crimson Hawks (Pennsylvania State Athletic Conference) (2011–2016)
2011	IUP	7–3	5–2	3rd (West)			
2012	IUP	12–2	6–1	1st (West)	L NCAA Division II Quarterfinal	7	
2013	IUP	9–2	5–2	2nd (West)		24	
2014	IUP	6–5	5–4	5th (West)			
2015	IUP	9–3	6–1	T–1st (West)	L NCAA Division II Second Round	19	
2016	IUP	10–2	6–1	2nd (West)	L NCAA Division II Second Round	12	
IUP:		53–17	33–11				
Elon Phoenix (Colonial Athletic Association) (2017–2018)
2017	Elon	8–4	6–2	3rd	L NCAA Division I First Round	21	20
2018	Elon	6–5	4–3	6th	L NCAA Division I First Round	19	19
Elon:		14–9	10–5				
James Madison Dukes (Colonial Athletic Association) (2019–2021)
2019	James Madison	14–2	8–0	1st	L NCAA Division I Championship	2	2
2020–21	James Madison	7–1	3–0	1st (South)	L NCAA Division I Semifinal	3	3
2021	James Madison	12–2	7–1	T–1st	L NCAA Division I Semifinal	3	3
James Madison Dukes (Sun Belt Conference) (2022–2023)
2022	James Madison	8–3	6–2	T–1st (East)			
2023	James Madison	11–1	7–1	1st (East)	Armed Forces (Note: On November 30, 2023, Cignetti was hired by Indiana before James Madison played in the Armed Forces Bowl.)	24	25
James Madison:		52–9	31–4				
Indiana Hoosiers (Big Ten Conference) (2024–present)
2024	Indiana	11–2	8–1	T–2nd	L CFP First Round^{†}	10	10
2025	Indiana	16–0	9–0	1st	W Rose^{†}, W Peach^{†}, W CFP NCG^{†}	1	1
2026	Indiana	9–2	6–2				
Indiana:		36–4	23–3				
Total:		155–39					
National championship Conference title Conference division title or championship game berth
^{†}Indicates CFP / New Years' Six bowl.; ^{#}Rankings from final AFCA poll for IUP, FCS Coaches Poll for Elon and James Madison (2019–2021), and Coaches Poll for James Madison (2022–2023) and Indiana.; ^{°}Rankings from final STATS poll for Elon and James Madison (2019–2021), and AP poll for James Madison (2022–2023) and Indiana.

== Records ==
NCAA Division I

- First NCAA Division I head coach to start 10–0 or better in consecutive seasons at different institutions (James Madison, 2023; Indiana, 2024)
- First NCAA Division I head coach in the CFP era (2014–present) to win 16 games in a single season (16–0)

Indiana

- Most head coaching wins in a single season: 16 (2026)
- Most Big Ten Conference head coaching wins in a single season: 9 (2025)
- First head coach to start their tenure with a 4–0 record (2024)
- First head coach to reach double-digit wins in a single season (2024)
- First head coach to defeat an AP top-five ranked opponent on the road (2025)
- First head coach with consecutive 10–0 seasons (2024, 2025)
- First head coach to reach the College Football Playoff (2024–25)

James Madison

- Most head coaching wins in a single season: 14 (2019)
  - Tied with Mike Houston (2016, 2017)
- Most Coastal Athletic Association head coaching wins in a single season: 8 (2019)
  - Tied with Mike Houston (2008, 2016, 2017)
- First head coach to reach an NCAA Division I FBS bowl game (2023 Armed Forces Bowl)

Elon

- First head coach to defeat a top-five FCS opponent (October 16, 2018, at No. 2 James Madison)
- First head coach to reach the NCAA Division I FCS Playoffs in back-to-back seasons (2017, 2018)
