= 2023 Armed Forces Bowl =

Postseason college football bowl game

2023 Lockheed Martin Armed Forces Bowl
- 21st Armed Forces Bowl
James Madison Dukes	Air Force Falcons
(11–1)	(8–4)
Sun Belt	MW
21	31
Head coach: Damian Wroblewski (interim)	Head coach: Troy Calhoun
AP / Coaches / CFP; 24 / 25 / NR
	1	2	3	4	Total
James Madison	7	0	7	7	21
Air Force	7	14	7	3	31
- Date: December 23, 2023
- Season: 2023
- Stadium: Amon G. Carter Stadium
- Location: Fort Worth, Texas
- MVP: Emmanuel Michel (RB, Air Force)
- Favorite: James Madison by 3.5
- Referee: Nate Black (AAC)
- Attendance: 30,828

United States TV coverage
- Network: ABC
- Announcers: Anish Shroff (play-by-play), Andre Ware (analyst), and Paul Carcaterra (sideline)

The 2023 Armed Forces Bowl was a college football bowl game played on December 23, 2023, at Amon G. Carter Stadium in Fort Worth, Texas. The 21st annual Armed Forces Bowl featured the Air Force Falcons of the Mountain West Conference and the James Madison Dukes of the Sun Belt Conference. The game begin at approximately 2:30 p.m. CST and was aired on ABC. The Armed Forces Bowl was one of the 2023–24 bowl games concluding the 2023 FBS football season. The game was officially named the Lockheed Martin Armed Forces Bowl after its corporate sponsor Lockheed Martin.

== Teams ==
The game featured the James Madison Dukes from the Sun Belt Conference and the Air Force Falcons from the Mountain West Conference.

This was the first time that James Madison and Air Force played each other.

=== James Madison Dukes ===
The Dukes entered the game ranked 24th in the AP poll with an 11–1 record (7–1 in Sun Belt games), having finished atop their conference's East Division. Because this was the final year of a two-year transition from the Football Championship Subdivision, James Madison was not originally bowl-eligible, with waiver requests denied by the NCAA in August and November. However, because of an insufficient number of bowl-eligible teams available to fill all bowl games, the Dukes were ultimately granted a berth.

This was the first bowl game in James Madison school history.

=== Air Force Falcons ===
The Falcons entered the game with an 8–4 record (5–3 in Mountain West games), tied for fourth place in their conference. They started their season with eight consecutive wins, culminating with a win over Colorado State, which was ranked 19th in the AP poll, but then lost their final four games of the regular season.

This was Air Force's seventh Armed Forces Bowl, extending their record for most appearances in the game. Entering the game, the Falcons had a 2–4 record in prior editions of the game, having most recently appeared in the 2022 edition, which they won.

== Game summary ==
2023 Lockheed Martin Armed Forces Bowl

Quarter	1	2	3	4	Total
James Madison	7	0	7	7	21
Air Force	7	14	7	3	31

at Amon G. Carter Stadium • Fort Worth, Texas

- Date: Saturday, December 23, 2023
- Game time: 2:30 p.m. CST
- Game weather: Cloudy • Temperature: 66 °F (19 °C) • Wind: 12 mph (19 km/h) SE
- Game attendance: 30,828
- Referee: Nate Black
- TV announcers (ABC): Anish Shroff (play-by-play), Andre Ware (analyst), and Paul Carcaterra (sideline)
- Box score

Game information

First Quarter

- (8:11) AF – Emmanuel Michel 1 yard run, Matthew Dapore kick (Drive: 8 plays, 86 yards, 4:30; Air Force 7–0)
- (5:00) JMU – Phoenix Sproles 18 yard pass from Jordan McCloud, Camden Wise kick (Drive: 7 plays, 75 yards, 3:11; Tied 7–7)

Second Quarter

- (7:51) AF – Emmanuel Michel 1 yard run, Matthew Dapore kick (Drive: 7 plays, 72 yards, 4:06; Air Force 14–7)
- (0:27) AF – Jared Roznos 42 yard pass from Zac Larrier, Matthew Dapore kick (Drive: 2 plays, 46 yards, 0:11; Air Force 21–7)

Third Quarter

- (9:11) JMU – Kaelon Black 5 yard pass from Jordan McCloud, Camden Wise kick (Drive: 5 plays, 51 yards, 1:56; Air Force 21–14)
- (4:07) AF – Zac Larrier 1 yard run, Matthew Dapore kick (Drive: 9 plays, 75 yards, 5:04; Air Force 28–14)

Fourth Quarter

- (8:20) AF – Matthew Dapore 26 yard field goal (Drive: 17 plays, 49 yards, 9:45; Air Force 31–14)
- (3:10) JMU – Phoenix Sproles 7 yard pass from Jordan McCloud, Camden Wise kick (Drive: 12 plays, 70 yards, 5:10; Air Force 31–21)

=== Statistics ===
Statistics	JMU	AFA
First downs	16	18
Plays–yards	52–283	68–396
Rushes–yards	19–26	63–351
Passing yards	257	45
Passing: comp–att–int	20–33–1	3–5–0
Time of possession	22:27	37:33

Team	Category	Player	Statistics
James Madison	Passing	Jordan McCloud	20/33, 257 yards, 3 TD, INT
James Madison	Rushing	Kaelon Black	11 carries, 43 yards
James Madison	Receiving	Elijah Sarratt	8 receptions, 115 yards
Air Force	Passing	Zac Larrier	3/5, 45 yards, TD
Air Force	Rushing	Emmanuel Michel	35 carries, 203 yards, 2 TD
Air Force	Receiving	Jared Roznos	1 reception, 42 yards, TD
