= 2023 UTEP Miners football team =

American college football season

2023 UTEP Miners football
- Conference: Conference USA
- Record: 3–9 (2–6 C-USA)
- Head coach: Dana Dimel (6th season)
- Offensive coordinator: Scotty Ohara (1st season)
- Offensive scheme: Spread
- Defensive coordinator: Bradley Dale Peveto (3rd season)
- Base defense: 4–2–5
- Home stadium: Sun Bowl

2023 Conference USA football standings
	Conf.			Overall
Team	W		L	W		L
No. 25 Liberty y$	8	–	0	13	–	1
New Mexico State y	7	–	1	10	–	5
Jacksonville State*	6	–	2	9	–	4
Western Kentucky	5	–	3	8	–	5
Middle Tennessee	3	–	5	4	–	8
UTEP	2	–	6	3	–	9
Sam Houston*	2	–	6	3	–	9
Louisiana Tech	2	–	6	3	–	9
FIU	1	–	7	4	–	8
Championship: Liberty 49, New Mexico State 35
$ – Conference champion; y – Championship game participant; * – Ineligible for postseason play due to FCS-to-FBS transition rules; Rankings from AP Poll

The 2023 UTEP Miners football team represented the University of Texas at El Paso (UTEP) as a member of Conference USA (C-USA) during the 2023 NCAA Division I FCS football season. Led by Dana Dimel in his sixth and final season as head coach, the Miners compiled an overall record of 3–9 with a mark of 2–6 in conference play, placing in a three-way tie for sixth in C-USA. The team played home games at the Sun Bowl in El Paso, Texas.

== Schedule ==
UTEP and Conference USA announced the 2023 football schedule on January 10, 2023.

Date	Time	Opponent	Site	TV	Result	Attendance
August 26	3:30 p.m.	at Jacksonville State	Burgess–Snow Field at JSU Stadium; Jacksonville, AL	CBSSN	L 14–17	17,982
September 2	7:00 p.m.	No. 7 (FCS) Incarnate Word*	Sun Bowl; El Paso, TX	ESPN+	W 28–14	30,738
September 9	1:30 p.m.	at Northwestern*	Ryan Field; Evanston, IL	BTN	L 7–38	14,851
September 16	9:00 p.m.	at Arizona*	Arizona Stadium; Tucson, AZ	P12N	L 10–31	44,182
September 23	7:00 p.m.	UNLV*	Sun Bowl; El Paso, TX	ESPN+	L 28–45	28,042
September 29	7:00 p.m.	Louisiana Tech	Sun Bowl; El Paso, TX	CBSSN	L 10–24	9,101
October 11	5:30 p.m.	at FIU	Riccardo Silva Stadium; Westchester, FL	ESPN2	W 27–14	14,872
October 18	7:00 p.m.	New Mexico State	Sun Bowl; El Paso, TX (Battle of I-10)	ESPN2	L 7–28	19,727
October 25	6:00 p.m.	at Sam Houston	Bowers Stadium; Huntsville, TX	ESPN2	W 37–34	6,889
November 4	7:00 p.m.	Western Kentucky^{†}	Sun Bowl; El Paso, TX	ESPN+	L 13–21	11,111
November 18	12:00 p.m.	at Middle Tennessee	Johnny "Red" Floyd Stadium; Murfreesboro, TN	ESPN+	L 30–34	9,122
November 25	1:30 p.m.	No. 25 Liberty	Sun Bowl; El Paso, TX	CBSSN	L 28–42	10,240
*Non-conference game; ^{†}Homecoming; Rankings from AP Poll (and CFP Rankings, after November 1) – Released prior to game; All times are in Mountain time

== Game summaries ==
=== vs Jacksonville State ===
UTEP Miners (0-0) vs Jacksonville State Gamecocks (0-0)

Team	1	2	3	4	Total
Miners	0	7	0	7	14
• Gamecocks	3	7	7	0	17

- Date: August 26
- Location: Burgess-Snow Field at JSU Stadium
  Jacksonville, Alabama
- Game start: 4:30 p.m. CST/2:30 p.m. PST
- Elapsed time: 3 hours and 15 minutes
- Game attendance: 17,982
- Game weather: Sunny, 97 °F (36 °C)
- Referee: Ron Hudson
- TV announcers (CBSSN): Rich Waltz (play-by-play), Aaron Taylor (analyst), Amanda Guerra (sideline)

Scoring summary
1st	4:57	JSU	Alen Karajic 41-yard field goal	JSU 3–0
2nd	13:26	JSU	Ron Wiggins 4-yard run (Alen Karajic kick)	JSU 10–0
2nd	0:00	UTEP	Deion Hankins 1-yard run (Buzz Flabiano kick)	JSU 10–7
3rd	7:47	JSU	Malik Jackson 7-yard run (Alen Karajic kick)	JSU 17–7
4th	12:19	UTEP	Kelly Akharaiyi 32-yard pass from Gavin Hardison (Buzz Flabiano kick)	JSU 17–14

Statistics	UTEP	Jacksonville State
First downs	22	15
Plays–yards	72–364	62–277
Rushes–yards	156	210
Passing yards	208	67
Passing: comp–att–int	17–29–2	10–20–0
Turnovers		
Time of possession	34:38	25:22

Team	Category	Player	Statistics
UTEP	Passing	Gavin Hardison	17/29, 208 yards, 1 TD, 2 INT
UTEP	Rushing	Torrance Burgess Jr.	12 carries, 58 yards
UTEP	Receiving	Kelly Akharaiyi	4 receptions, 102 yards, 1 TD
Jacksonville State	Passing	Zion Webb	10/20, 67 yards
Jacksonville State	Rushing	Malik Jackson	13 carries, 76 yards, 1 TD
Jacksonville State	Receiving	Ron Wiggins	2 receptions, 24 yards

=== No. 7 (FCS) Incarnate Word ===
Incarnate Word Cardinals at UTEP Miners

Quarter	1	2	3	4	Total
No. 7 Cardinals	7	7	0	0	14
Miners	7	7	7	7	28

at Sun Bowl (stadium), El Paso, TX

- Date: September 2
- Game time: 8:00 p.m.
- Game weather: Temperature: 92 • Wind: SW 3 mph • Weather: Sunny
- Game attendance: 30,738
- Referee: Ed Ardito
- TV: ESPN+
- Box Score

Game information

First Quarter

- UIW – 10:46 Brandon Porter 34 yard pass from Zach Calzada, Mason Lawler kick
  UIW 7–0 Drive: 4 plays, 44 yards, 1:24
- UTEP – 6:52 Torrance Burgess Jr. 40 yard run, Buzz Flabiano kick
  Tied 7–7 Drive: 8 plays, 75 yards, 3:54

Second Quarter

- UIW – 10:42 Tre Siggers 5 yard run, Mason Lawler kick
  UIW 14–7 Drive: 7 plays, 92 yards, 2:29
- UTEP – 4:52 Jostein Clarke 13 yard pass from Gavin Hardison, Buzz Flabiano kick
  Tied 14–14 Drive: 10 plays, 78 yards, 5:43

Third Quarter

- UTEP – 6:40 Tyrin Smith 24 yard pass from Gavin Hardison, Buzz Flabiano kick
  UTEP 21–14 Drive: 12 plays, 75 yards, 8:20

Fourth Quarter

- UTEP – 8:47 Mike Franklin 3 yard run, Buzz Flabiano kick
  UTEP 28–14 Drive: 12 plays, 96 yards, 7:08

Statistics	UIW	UTEP
First downs	19	25
Plays–yards	58–308	63–423
Rushes–yards	27–63	50–329
Passing yards	245	94
Passing: comp–att–int	18–31–1	10–13–0
Turnovers		
Time of possession	24:28	35:32

Team	Category	Player	Statistics
Incarnate Word	Passing	Zach Calzada	18/31, 245 yards, 1 TD, 1 INT
Incarnate Word	Rushing	Tre Siggers	12 carries, 39 yards, 1 TD
Incarnate Word	Receiving	Brandon Porter	6 receptions, 94 yards, 1 TD
UTEP	Passing	Gavin Hardison	10/13, 94 yards, 2 TD
UTEP	Rushing	Deion Hankins	24 carries, 174 yards
UTEP	Receiving	Tyrin Smith	4 receptions, 49 yards, 1 TD

=== at Northwestern ===
	1	2	3	4	Total
Miners	7	0	0	0	7
Wildcats	7	0	21	10	38

Statistics	UTEP	NU
First downs	18	17
Total yards	319	391
Rushing yards	104	184
Passing yards	215	207
Turnovers	3	0
Time of possession	31:21	28:39

Team	Category	Player	Statistics
UTEP	Passing	Gavin Hardison	17/25, 192 yards, TD, 2 INT
UTEP	Rushing	Torrance Burgess Jr.	7 rushes, 34 yards
UTEP	Receiving	Jeremiah Ballard	4 receptions, 92 yards
Northwestern	Passing	Ben Bryant	11/17, 116 yards, TD
Northwestern	Rushing	Cam Porter	17 rushes, 90 yards
Northwestern	Receiving	Joseph Himon II	1 reception, 85 yards, TD

=== at Arizona ===
UTEP Miners (1–2) vs Arizona Wildcats (1–1) – Game summary

Quarter	1	2	3	4	Total
Miners	0	3	0	7	10
Wildcats	0	14	10	7	31

at Arizona Stadium • Tucson, AZ

- Date: September 16, 2023
- Game time: 8:00 p.m.
- Game weather: Sunny, 89 °F (32 °C)
- Game attendance: 44,182
- Referee: Mark Duddy
- TV announcers (Pac-12 Network): Jordan Kent (play-by-play), Bob Davie (analyst)

Game information

First quarter

None

Second quarter

- (14:53) ARIZ – Tetairoa McMillan 18-yard pass from Jayden de Laura, Tyler Loop kick (Drive: 7 plays, 92 yards, 2:38; Arizona 7–0)
- (5:13) UTEP – Buzz Flabiano 25-yard field goal (Drive: 7 plays, 65 yards, 3:40; Arizona 7–3)
- (1:23) ARIZ – Michael Wiley 3-yard run, Tyler Loop kick (Drive: 10 plays, 74 yards, 3:44; Arizona 14–3)

Third quarter

- (8:59) ARIZ – Tyler Loop 38-yard field goal (Drive: 8 plays, 54 yards, 4:33; Arizona 17–3)
- (2:42) ARIZ – Jacob Cowing 2-yard pass from Jayden de Laura, Tyler Loop kick (Drive: 6 plays, 82 yards, 3:13; Arizona 24–3)

Fourth quarter

- (9:19) ARIZ – Montana Lemonious-Craig 4-yard pass from Jayden de Laura, Tyler Loop kick (Drive: 3 plays, 26 yards, 1:26; Arizona 31–3)
- (1:32) UTEP – Javoni Gardere 25-yard pass from Kevin Hurley, Buzz Flabiano kick (Drive: 7 plays, 75 yards, 3:12; Arizona 31–10)

Statistics	UTEP	ARIZ
First downs	13	26
Total yards	332	544
Rushing yards	26–49	32–244
Passing yards	283	300
Passing: Comp–Att–Int	18–35–0	25–32–0
Time of possession	29:43	30:17

Team	Category	Player	Statistics
UTEP	Passing	Gavin Hardison	15/31, 228 yards
UTEP	Rushing	Deion Hankins	9 carries, 34 yards
UTEP	Receiving	Torrance Burgess Jr.	3 receptions, 78 yards
Arizona	Passing	Jayden de Laura	23/29, 285 yards, 3 TD
Arizona	Rushing	Michael Wiley	17 carries, 87 yards, TD
Arizona	Receiving	Tetairoa McMillan	6 receptions, 89 yards, TD

=== UNLV ===
UNLV Rebels (2–1) at UTEP Miners (1–4) – Game summary

Quarter	1	2	3	4	Total
Rebels	14	14	0	17	45
Miners	7	7	7	7	28

at Sun Bowl • El Paso, TX

- Date: September 23, 2023
- Game time: 7:00 p.m. MST
- Game weather: Sunny, 92 °F (33 °C)
- Game attendance: 28,042
- Referee: Ron Hudson
- TV announcers (ESPN+): Duke Keith, Jacob Boggs

Game information

First quarter

- (9:27) UNLV – Jai'Den Thomas 12-yard run, Jose Pizano kick (Drive: 1 play, 12 yards, 0:07; UNLV 7–0)
- (3:20) UTEP – Gavin Hardison 1-yard run, Buzz Flabiano kick (Drive: 10 plays, 75 yards, 6:07; Tied 7–7)
- (2:14) UNLV – Jai'Den Thomas 17-yard run, Jose Pizano kick (Drive: 3 plays, 75 yards, 1:06; UNLV 14–7)

Second quarter

- (5:11) UTEP – Gavin Hardison 1-yard run, Buzz Flabiano kick (Drive: 10 plays, 57 yards, 5:35; Tied 14–14)
- (3:18) UNLV – Lester Donavyn 1-yard run, Jose Pizano kick (Drive: 5 plays, 75 yards, 1:53; UNLV 21–14)
- (1:01) UNLV – Jai'Den Thomas 5-yard run, Jose Pizano kick (Drive: 6 plays, 32 yards, 1:17; UNLV 28–14)

Third quarter

- (11:12) UTEP – Torrance Burgess Jr. 11-yard run, Buzz Flabiano kick (Drive: 7 plays, 75 yards, 3:48; UNLV 28–21)

Fourth quarter

- (14:30) UNLV – Jai'Den Thomas 1-yard run, Jose Pizano kick (Drive: 6 plays, 77 yards, 1:47; UNLV 35–21)
- (5:28) UTEP – Jeremiah Ballard 27-yard pass from Gavin Hardison, Buzz Flabiano kick (Drive: 6 plays, 77 yards, 3:16; UNLV 35–28)
- (7:39) UNLV – Courtney Reese 32-yard run, Jose Pizano kick (Drive: 9 plays, 66 yards, 3:22; UNLV 42–28)
- (1:56) UNLV – Jose Pizano 30-yard field goal (Drive: 5 plays, 23 yards, 2:24; UNLV 45–28)

Statistics	UNLV	UTEP
First downs	23	21
Total yards	497	316
Rushing yards	48–307	34–91
Passing yards	190	225
Passing: Comp–Att–Int	15–27–1	14–31–3
Time of possession	29:51	30:09

Team	Category	Player	Statistics
UNLV	Passing	Jayden Maiava	15/27, 190 yards, INT
UNLV	Rushing	Jai'Den Thomas	13 carries, 100 yards, 4 TD
UNLV	Receiving	Ricky White	2 receptions, 62 yards
UTEP	Passing	Gavin Hardison	14/31, 225 yards, TD, 3 INT
UTEP	Rushing	Torrance Burgess Jr.	19 carries, 99 yards, TD
UTEP	Receiving	Kelly Akharaiyi	4 receptions, 92 yards

=== Louisiana Tech ===
	1	2	3	4	Total
Bulldogs	14	3	0	7	24
Miners	0	7	3	0	10

Statistics	LT	UTEP
First downs	14	17
Total yards	294	321
Rushing yards	142	220
Passing yards	152	101
Turnovers	0	1
Time of possession	27:08	32:52

Team	Category	Player	Statistics
Louisiana Tech	Passing	Jack Turner	9/20, 152 yards, TD
Louisiana Tech	Rushing	Tyre Shelton	16 rushes, 104 yards, TD
Louisiana Tech	Receiving	Cyrus Allen	1 reception, 85 yards
UTEP	Passing	Cade McConnell	4/11, 48 yards
UTEP	Rushing	Deion Hankins	15 rushes, 83 yards
UTEP	Receiving	Jeremiah Ballard	3 receptions, 39 yards

=== at FIU ===
UTEP Miners (1-5) at FIU Panthers (3-3) – Game Summary

Quarter	1	2	3	4	Total
Miners	0	0	0	0	0
Panthers	0	0	0	0	0

at Riccardo Silva Stadium • Westchester, Florida

- Date: October 11th
- Game time: 7:30 p.m. EST/4:30 p.m. PST
- Game attendance: 14,872
- TV announcers (ESPN2): TBD

Game information

First quarter

Second quarter

Third quarter

Fourth quarter

Statistics	UTEP	FIU
First downs		
Plays–yards		
Rushes–yards		
Passing yards		
Passing: comp–att–int		
Turnovers		
Time of possession		

Team	Category	Player	Statistics
UTEP	Passing		
UTEP	Rushing		
UTEP	Receiving		
FIU	Passing		
FIU	Rushing		
FIU	Receiving		

=== New Mexico State ===
New Mexico State Aggies at UTEP Miners – Game summary

Quarter	1	2	3	4	Total
Aggies	7	0	14	7	28
Miners	0	7	0	0	7

at Sun Bowl, El Paso, Texas

- Date: October 18
- Game time: 7:00 p.m. MDT
- Game weather: Sunny, 81 °F (27 °C)
- Game attendance: 19,727
- Referee: Rory Bernard
- TV announcers (ESPN2): John Schriffen, Cole Cubelic, and Taylor Davis
- Box score, Recap

Game information
First quarter
- NMSU – Diego Pavia 10-yard run (Ethan Albertson kick), 1:18. Aggies 7–0. Drive: 8 plays, 74 yards, 4:49.

Second quarter

- UTEP – Kevin Hurley 1-yard run (Buzz Flabiano kick), 12:26. Tied 7–7. Drive: 7 plays, 75 yards, 3:52.

Third quarter

- NMSU – Thomaz Whitford 6-yard pass from Diego Pavia (Ethan Albertson kick), 12:29. Aggies 14–7. Drive: 5 plays, 69 yards, 2:24.
- NMSU – Diego Pavia 41-yard run (Ethan Albertson kick), 6:44. Aggies 21–7. Drive: 9 plays, 80 yards, 3:59.

Fourth quarter

- NMSU – Thomaz Whitford 16-yard pass from Diego Pavia (Ethan Albertson kick), 13:31. Aggies 28–7. Drive: 7 plays, 53 yards, 3:53.

Statistics	NMSU	UTEP
First downs	23	16
Total yards	439	304
Rushing yards	253	125
Passing yards	186	179
Turnovers	0	0
Time of possession	30:17	29:43

Team	Category	Player	Statistics
New Mexico State	Passing	Diego Pavia	15/25, 186 yards, 2 TD
New Mexico State	Rushing	Monte Watkins	10 rushes, 109 yards
New Mexico State	Receiving	Eli Stowers	5 receptions, 80 yards
UTEP	Passing	Cade McConnell	15/32, 179 yards
UTEP	Rushing	Deion Hankins	16 rushes, 120 yards
UTEP	Receiving	Jeremiah Ballard	5 receptions, 75 yards

=== at Sam Houston ===
UTEP Miners at Sam Houston State Bearkats – Game summary

Quarter	1	2	3	4	Total
Miners	0	13	7	17	37
Bearkats	7	14	6	7	34

at Bowers Stadium, Huntsville, Texas

- Date: October 25
- Game time: 7:00 p.m. CDT
- TV: ESPN2
- First quarter
  - SHSU – John Gentry 28-yard run (Colby Sessums kick), 6:24. Bearkats 7–0.
  Second quarter
  - UTEP – Delon Hankins 2-yard run (Buzz Flabiano kick), 12:26. Tied 7–7.
  - SHSU – John Gentry 18-yard pass from Keegan Shoemaker (Colby Sessums kick), 9:52. Bearkats 14-7
  - UTEP – Buzz Flabiano 23-yard field goal, 2:45. Bearkats 14-10
  - SHSU – Malik Phillips 6-yard pass from Keegan Shoemaker (Colby Sessums kick), 0:44. Bearkats 21-10
  - UTEP – Buzz Flabiano 43-yard field goal, 0:00. Bearkats 21-13
  Third quarter
  - SHSU – Colby Sessums 22-yard field goal, 10:45. Bearkats 24-13
  - SHSU – Colby Sessums 31-yard field goal, 6:14. Bearkats 27-13
  - UTEP – Mike Franklin 3-yard run (Buzz Flabiano kick), 1:07. Bearkats 27–20.
  Fourth quarter
  - UTEP – Kelly Akharaiyi 25-yard pass from Cade McConnell (Buzz Flabiano kick), 11:25. Tied 27–27.
  - UTEP – Kevin Hurley 1-yard run (Buzz Flabiano kick), 9:57. Miners 34–27.
  - SHSU – Noah Smith 4-yard run (Colby Sessums kick), 6:02. Tied 34-34
  - UTEP – Buzz Flabiano 32-yard field goal, 0:03. Miners 37-34

Statistics	UTEP	SHSU
First downs	17	22
Total yards	428	354
Rushing yards	222	129
Passing yards	206	225
Turnovers	1	1
Time of possession	31:58	28:02

Team	Category	Player	Statistics
UTEP	Passing	Cade McConnell	12/22, 206 yards, TD, INT
UTEP	Rushing	Deion Hankins	15 carries, 117 yards, TD
UTEP	Receiving	Kelly Akharaiyi	6 receptions, 126 yards, TD
Sam Houston State	Passing	Keegan Shoemaker	22/39, 202 yards, 2 TDs, 1 INT
Sam Houston State	Rushing	John Gentry	16 carries, 71 yards, TD
Sam Houston State	Receiving	Noah Smith	7 receptions, 67 yards

== Personnel ==
=== Transfers ===
==== Incoming ====
Name	Pos.	Previous school
Dre Spriggs	WR	UTSA
AJ Odums	CB	New Mexico

==== Outgoing ====
Name	Pos.	New school
Tyrin Smith	WR	Texas A&M
Verenzo Holmes	CB	Northwest Mississippi Community College
Justin Prince	S	Unknown
Luke Soto	TE	Marshall
Jeremiah Byers	OT	Florida State
Darryl Minor	LB	Indiana

== NFL draft ==
The 2024 NFL draft was held at Campus Martius Park in Detroit, Michigan, on April 25–27, 2024. Miners who were picked in the 2024 NFL draft:

Round	Pick	Player	Position	NFL team
4	118	Tyrice Knight	LB	Seattle Seahawks
6	220	Elijah Klein	OG	Tampa Bay Buccaneers

Additionally, Gavin Hardison, Andrew Meyer and Zuri Henry were signed as undrafted free agents.
