= 2023 Conference USA football season =

- League: NCAA Division I Football Bowl Subdivision
- Sport: Football
- Duration: August 26 – December 2, 2023
- Teams: 9

2024 NFL Draft
- Top draft pick: Malachi Corley, WR, Western Kentucky
- Picked by: New York Jets (round 3, pick 65)

Regular season
- Season champions: Liberty

CUSA Championship Game
- Date: December 2, 2023
- Venue: Williams Stadium, Lynchburg, Virginia
- Champions: Liberty
- Runners-up: New Mexico State
- Finals MVP: Kaidon Salter, QB, Liberty

Seasons
- ← 2022 2024 →

2023 Conference USA football standings
	Conf.			Overall
Team	W		L	W		L
No. 25 Liberty y$	8	–	0	13	–	1
New Mexico State y	7	–	1	10	–	5
Jacksonville State*	6	–	2	9	–	4
Western Kentucky	5	–	3	8	–	5
Middle Tennessee	3	–	5	4	–	8
UTEP	2	–	6	3	–	9
Sam Houston*	2	–	6	3	–	9
Louisiana Tech	2	–	6	3	–	9
FIU	1	–	7	4	–	8
Championship: Liberty 49, New Mexico State 35
$ – Conference champion; y – Championship game participant; * – Ineligible for postseason play due to FCS-to-FBS transition rules; Rankings from AP Poll

The 2023 Conference USA football season was the 28th season of college football play for Conference USA (CUSA). The season began on August 26, 2023 and ended with the Conference Championship Game on December 2, 2023. The conference consisted of nine members and was part of the 2023 NCAA Division I FBS football season.

== Conference realignment ==
Prior to the 2023 season, Conference USA saw substantial realignment, with six schools leaving the conference to join the American Athletic Conference: UTSA, North Texas, Charlotte, Florida Atlantic, Rice, and UAB. Conference USA then invited four schools to join: Liberty and New Mexico State, who were both previously FBS independents; Jacksonville State, who were previously in the ASUN Conference at the Division I FCS level; and Sam Houston, who were previously in the Western Athletic Conference also at the Division I FCS level. The realignment left CUSA with nine football members for the 2023 season. CUSA further announced that Kennesaw State, another member of the ASUN Conference, would move up beginning in 2024.

On the same day the membership changes took effect (July 1, 2023), the conference unveiled a "brand refresh". The former abbreviation of "C-USA" was retired in favor of "CUSA", and the logo was slightly updated.

Both Jacksonville State and Sam Houston were initially ineligible for both the conference championship and for bowl games due to their transition from the FCS level to FBS level. However, Jacksonville State received a berth in the New Orleans Bowl after only 79 non-transitional teams were eligible to fill the 82 bowl slots this season.

== Preseason ==
=== Preseason poll ===
The preseason poll was released on July 21, 2023.

Media poll
Predicted finish	Team	1st place votes
1	Western Kentucky	18
2	Liberty	4
3	Middle Tennessee	
4	Louisiana Tech	
5	New Mexico State	
6	UTEP	
7	Jacksonville State	
8t	FIU	
8t	Sam Houston	

=== Preseason player awards ===
Preseason player awards were announced on July 24.

- Offensive Player of the Year: Austin Reed (Redshirt Senior, Western Kentucky quarterback)
- Defensive Player of the Year: JaQues Evans (Junior, Western Kentucky linebacker)
- Special Teams Player of the Year: Smoke Harris (Redshirt Senior, Louisiana Tech kick returner/punt returner)

== Head coaches ==
- On December 4, 2022, Jamey Chadwell was announced as the new head coach of Liberty after previous head coach Hugh Freeze left to take the head coaching position at Auburn. Chadwell had previously been head coach of Coastal Carolina in the Sun Belt Conference.

Note: All stats shown are before the start of the 2023 season.

Team	Head coach	Years at school	Overall record	Record at school	CUSA Record
FIU	Mike MacIntyre	2	50–73	4–8	2–6
Jacksonville State	Rich Rodriguez	2	172–121–2	9–2	0–0
Liberty	Jamey Chadwell	1	99–57	0–0	0–0
Louisiana Tech	Sonny Cumbie	2	5–12	3–9	2–6
Middle Tennessee	Rick Stockstill	18	109–103	109–103	79–53
New Mexico State	Jerry Kill	2	165–110	7–6	0–0
Sam Houston	K. C. Keeler	10	259–100–1	85–27	0–0
UTEP	Dana Dimel	6	47–79	17–40	8–28
Western Kentucky	Tyson Helton	5	32–21	32–21	23–8

=== Post-season changes ===
- On November 26, UTEP announced that it had fired head coach Dana Dimel after 6 season with the school. Dimel had posted a 20–49 record in his tenure. On December 4, UTEP announced Scotty Walden as the new head coach for the 2024 season. Walden had previously been head coach at Austin Peay.
- On November 27, Middle Tennessee announced that it had fired head coach Rick Stockstill after 18 seasons with the school. Stockstill had a 113–111 record during his tenure at the school. On December 6, Middle Tennessee announced Derek Mason as the new head coach for the 2024 season. Mason had previously been head coach at Vanderbilt.
- On December 23, New Mexico State head coach Jerry Kill announced that he was stepping down from the position. The school announced that wide receivers coach Tony Sanchez would be promoted to the head coach position for 2024.

== Rankings ==
		Pre	Wk 1	Wk 2	Wk 3	Wk 4	Wk 5	Wk 6	Wk 7	Wk 8	Wk 9	Wk 10	Wk 11	Wk 12	Wk 13	Wk 14	Final
FIU	AP																
FIU	C																
FIU	CFP	Not released															
Jacksonville State	AP																
Jacksonville State	C																
Jacksonville State	CFP	Not released															
Liberty	AP	RV							RV	RV	RV	25	25	22	20	18	25
Liberty	C					RV		RV	RV	RV	RV	RV	RV	22	22	20	RV
Liberty	CFP	Not released												25	24	23	
Louisiana Tech	AP																
Louisiana Tech	C																
Louisiana Tech	CFP	Not released															
Middle Tennessee	AP																
Middle Tennessee	C																
Middle Tennessee	CFP	Not released															
New Mexico State	AP													RV	RV		
New Mexico State	C														RV	RV	
New Mexico State	CFP	Not released															
Sam Houston	AP																
Sam Houston	C																
Sam Houston	CFP	Not released															
UTEP	AP																
UTEP	C																
UTEP	CFP	Not released															
Western Kentucky	AP																
Western Kentucky	C																
Western Kentucky	CFP	Not released															

Legend
	Improvement in ranking
	Drop in ranking
	Not ranked previous week
	No change in ranking from previous week
RV	Received votes but were not ranked in Top 25 of poll
т	Tied with team above or below also with this symbol

== Schedule ==
Index to colors and formatting
CUSA member won
CUSA member lost
CUSA teams in **bold**

The 2023 schedule was released on January 10, 2023.

All times Eastern time.

=== Week 0 ===
Date	Time	Visiting team	Home team	Site	TV	Result	Attendance	Ref.
August 26	5:30 p.m.	**UTEP**	**Jacksonville State**	Burgess–Snow Field at JSU Stadium • Jacksonville, AL	CBSSN	**JVST** 17–14	17,982	
August 26	7:00 p.m.	UMass	**New Mexico State**	Aggie Memorial Stadium • Las Cruces, NM	ESPN	**L** 30–41	15,356	
August 26	9:00 p.m.	**FIU**	**Louisiana Tech**	Joe Aillet Stadium • Ruston, LA	CBSSN	**LT** 22–17	16,299	
^{#}Rankings from AP Poll released prior to game. All times are in Eastern Time.

=== Week 1 ===
Date	Time	Visiting team	Home team	Site	TV	Result	Attendance	Ref.
September 2	12:00 p.m.	**Louisiana Tech**	SMU	Gerald J. Ford Stadium • University Park, TX	ESPNU	**L** 14–38	21,490	
September 2	12:00 p.m.	Bowling Green	**Liberty**	Williams Stadium • Lynchburg, VA	CBSSN	**W** 34–24	18,811	
September 2	2:00 p.m.	East Tennessee State	**Jacksonville State**	Burgess–Snow Field at JSU Stadium • Jacksonville, AL	ESPN+	**W** 49–3	21,276	
September 2	3:30 p.m.	South Florida	**Western Kentucky**	Houchens Industries–L. T. Smith Stadium • Bowling Green, KY	CBSSN	**W** 41–24	15,438	
September 2	6:30 p.m.	Maine	**FIU**	Riccardo Silva Stadium • Westchester, FL	ESPN+	**W** 14–12	16,878	
September 2	7:30 p.m.	**Middle Tennessee**	No. 4 Alabama	Bryant–Denny Stadium • Tuscaloosa, AL	SECN	**L** 7–56	100,077	
September 2	9:00 p.m.	Western Illinois	**New Mexico State**	Aggie Memorial Stadium • Las Cruces, NM	ESPN+	**W** 58–21	17,943	
September 2	9:00 p.m.	No. 7 (FCS) Incarnate Word	**UTEP**	Sun Bowl • El Paso, TX	ESPN+	**W** 28–14	30,738	
September 2	10:15 p.m.	**Sam Houston**	BYU	LaVell Edwards Stadium • Provo, UT	FS1	**L** 0–14	59,006	
^{#}Rankings from AP Poll released prior to game. All times are in Eastern Time.

=== Week 2 ===
Date	Time	Visiting team	Home team	Site	TV	Result	Attendance	Ref.
September 9	3:30 p.m.	**UTEP**	Northwestern	Ryan Field • Evanston, IL	BTN	**L** 7–38	14,851	
September 9	6:00 p.m.	**New Mexico State**	**Liberty**	Williams Stadium • Lynchburg, VA	ESPN+	**LIB** 33–17	20,123	
September 9	6:30 p.m.	North Texas	**FIU**	Riccardo Silva Stadium • Westchester, FL	ESPN+	**W** 46–39	15,754	
September 9	7:00 p.m.	**Jacksonville State**	Coastal Carolina	Brooks Stadium • Conway, SC	ESPN+	**L** 16–30	16,006	
September 9	7:00 p.m.	Northwestern State	**Louisiana Tech**	Joe Aillet Stadium • Ruston, LA	ESPN+	**W** 51–21	19,152	
September 9	7:00 p.m.	**Middle Tennessee**	Missouri	Faurot Field • Columbia, MO	SECN+/ESPN+	**L** 19–23	57,645	
September 9	7:00 p.m.	Houston Christian	**Western Kentucky**	Houchens Industries–L. T. Smith Stadium • Bowling Green, KY	ESPN+	**W** 52–22	20,712	
September 9	8:00 p.m.	Air Force	**Sam Houston**	NRG Stadium • Houston, TX	CBSSN	**L** 3–13	25,121	
^{#}Rankings from AP Poll released prior to game. All times are in Eastern Time.

=== Week 3 ===
Date	Time	Visiting team	Home team	Site	TV	Result	Attendance	Ref.
September 16	12:00 p.m.	**Liberty**	Buffalo	UB Stadium • Amherst, NY	CBSSN	**W** 55–27	13,020	
September 16	3:30 p.m.	**FIU**	UConn	Pratt & Whitney Stadium • East Hartford, CT	CBSSN	**W** 24–17	20,405	
September 16	4:00 p.m.	**Western Kentucky**	No. 6 Ohio State	Ohio Stadium • Columbus, OH	FOX	**L** 10–63	100,217	
September 16	7:00 p.m.	North Texas	**Louisiana Tech**	Joe Aillet Stadium • Ruston, LA	ESPN+	**L** 37–40	17,434	
September 16	7:00 p.m.	Murray State	**Middle Tennessee**	Johnny "Red" Floyd Stadium • Murfreesboro, TN	ESPN+	**W** 35–14	16,605	
September 16	8:00 p.m.	**New Mexico State**	New Mexico	University Stadium • Albuquerque, NM (Rio Grande Rivalry)		**W** 27–17	27,414	
September 16	11:00 p.m.	**UTEP**	Arizona	Arizona Stadium • Tucson, AZ	P12N	**L** 10–31	44,182	
^{#}Rankings from AP Poll released prior to game. All times are in Eastern Time.

=== Week 4 ===
Date	Time	Visiting team	Home team	Site	TV	Result	Attendance	Ref.
September 23	12:00 p.m.	**Western Kentucky**	Troy	Veterans Memorial Stadium • Troy, AL	ESPNU	**L** 24–27	26,124	
September 23	3:30 p.m.	**Louisiana Tech**	Nebraska	Memorial Stadium • Lincoln, NE	BTN	**L** 14–28	87,115	
September 23	5:00 p.m.	Eastern Michigan	**Jacksonville State**	Burgess–Snow Field at JSU Stadium • Jacksonville, AL	ESPN+	**W** 21–0	20,966	
September 23	6:30 p.m.	**Liberty**	**FIU**	Riccardo Silva Stadium • Westchester, FL	ESPN+	**LIB** 38–6	17,437	
September 23	7:00 p.m.	**Sam Houston**	Houston	TDECU Stadium • Houston, TX	B12N/ESPN+	**L** 7–38	35,044	
September 23	7:00 p.m.	Colorado State	**Middle Tennessee**	Johnny "Red" Floyd Stadium • Murfreesboro, TN	ESPN+	**L** 23–31	19,806	
September 23	9:00 p.m.	UNLV	**UTEP**	Sun Bowl • El Paso, TX	ESPN+	**L** 28–45	28,042	
September 23	11:59 p.m.	**New Mexico State**	Hawaii	Clarence T. C. Ching Athletics Complex • Honolulu, HI		**L** 17–20	10,254	
^{#}Rankings from AP Poll released prior to game. All times are in Eastern Time.

=== Week 5 ===
Date	Time	Visiting team	Home team	Site	TV	Result	Attendance	Ref.
September 28	7:30 p.m.	**Middle Tennessee**	**Western Kentucky**	Houchens Industries–L. T. Smith Stadium • Bowling Green, KY (100 Miles of Hate)	CBSSN	**WKU** 31–10	14,712	
September 28	8:00 p.m.	**Jacksonville State**	**Sam Houston**	Bowers Stadium • Huntsville, TX	ESPNU	**JVST** 35–28 ^{OT}	14,566	
September 29	9:00 p.m.	**Louisiana Tech**	**UTEP**	Sun Bowl • El Paso, TX	CBSSN	**LT** 24–10	9,101	
^{#}Rankings from AP Poll released prior to game. All times are in Eastern Time.

=== Week 6 ===
Date	Time	Visiting team	Home team	Site	TV	Result	Attendance	Ref.
October 4	8:00 p.m.	**Jacksonville State**	**Middle Tennessee**	Johnny "Red" Floyd Stadium • Murfreesboro, TN	ESPNU	**JVST** 45–30	13,066	
October 4	9:00 p.m.	**FIU**	**New Mexico State**	Aggie Memorial Stadium • Las Cruces, NM	CBSSN	**NMSU** 34–17	11,540	
October 5	7:00 p.m.	**Sam Houston**	**Liberty**	Williams Stadium • Lynchburg, VA	CBSSN	**LIB** 21–16	17,100	
October 5	8:00 p.m.	**Western Kentucky**	**Louisiana Tech**	Joe Aillet Stadium • Ruston, LA	ESPNU	**WKU** 35–28	13,014	
^{#}Rankings from AP Poll released prior to game. All times are in Eastern Time.

=== Week 7 ===
Date	Time	Visiting team	Home team	Site	TV	Result	Attendance	Ref.
October 10	7:00 p.m.	**Louisiana Tech**	**Middle Tennessee**	Johnny "Red" Floyd Stadium • Murfreesboro, TN	CBSSN	**MTSU** 31–23	9,602	
October 10	7:30 p.m.	**Liberty**	**Jacksonville State**	Burgess–Snow Field at JSU Stadium • Jacksonville, AL	ESPNU	**LIB** 31–13	21,745	
October 11	7:30 p.m.	**UTEP**	**FIU**	Riccardo Silva Stadium • Westchester, FL	ESPN2	**UTEP** 27–14	14,872	
October 11	9:00 p.m.	**Sam Houston**	**New Mexico State**	Aggie Memorial Stadium • Las Cruces, NM	CBSSN	**NMSU** 27–13	12,812	
^{#}Rankings from AP Poll released prior to game. All times are in Eastern Time.

=== Week 8 ===
Date	Time	Visiting team	Home team	Site	TV	Result	Attendance	Ref.
October 17	7:00 p.m.	**Middle Tennessee**	**Liberty**	Williams Stadium • Lynchburg, VA	CBSSN	**LIB** 42–35	16,354	
October 17	7:30 p.m.	**Western Kentucky**	**Jacksonville State**	Burgess–Snow Field at JSU Stadium • Jacksonville, AL	ESPNU	**JVST** 20–17	17,977	
October 18	7:00 p.m.	**FIU**	**Sam Houston**	Bowers Stadium • Huntsville, TX	CBSSN	**FIU** 33–27 ^{2OT}	7,543	
October 18	9:00 p.m.	**New Mexico State**	**UTEP**	Sun Bowl • El Paso, TX (Battle of I-10)	ESPN2	**NMSU** 28–7	19,727	
^{#}Rankings from AP Poll released prior to game. All times are in Eastern Time.

=== Week 9 ===
Date	Time	Visiting team	Home team	Site	TV	Result	Attendance	Ref.
October 24	7:00 p.m.	**New Mexico State**	**Louisiana Tech**	Joe Aillet Stadium • Ruston, LA	CBSSN	**NMSU** 27–24	13,798	
October 24	7:30 p.m.	**Liberty**	**Western Kentucky**	Houchens Industries–L. T. Smith Stadium • Bowling Green, KY	ESPNU	**LIB** 42–29	16,036	
October 25	7:00 p.m.	**Jacksonville State**	**FIU**	Riccardo Silva Stadium • Westchester, FL	CBSSN	**JVST** 41–16	14,074	
October 25	8:00 p.m.	**UTEP**	**Sam Houston**	Bowers Stadium • Huntsville, TX	ESPN2	**UTEP** 37–34	6,889	
^{#}Rankings from AP Poll released prior to game. All times are in Eastern Time.

=== Week 10 ===
Date	Time	Visiting team	Home team	Site	TV	Result	Attendance	Ref.
November 4	12:00 p.m.	**Jacksonville State**	South Carolina	Williams–Brice Stadium • Columbia, SC	ESPNU	**L** 28–38	75,348	
November 4	1:00 p.m.	Kennesaw State	**Sam Houston**	Bowers Stadium • Huntsville, TX	ESPN+	**W** 24–21	7,143	
November 4	6:00 p.m.	**Louisiana Tech**	**Liberty**	Williams Stadium • Lynchburg, VA	CBSSN	**LIB** 56–30	21,647	
November 4	6:00 p.m.	**Middle Tennessee**	**New Mexico State**	Aggie Memorial Stadium • Las Cruces, NM	ESPN+	**NMSU** 13–7	-	
November 4	9:00 p.m.	**Western Kentucky**	**UTEP**	Sun Bowl • El Paso, TX	ESPN+	**WKU** 21–13	11,111	
^{#}Rankings from College Football Playoff. All times are in Eastern Time.

=== Week 11 ===
Date	Time	Visiting team	Home team	Site	TV	Result	Attendance	Ref.
November 11	1:00 p.m.	Old Dominion	**Liberty**	Williams Stadium • Lynchburg, VA	ESPN+	**W** 38–10	21,481	
November 11	3:00 p.m.	**Sam Houston**	**Louisiana Tech**	Joe Aillet Stadium • Ruston, LA	ESPN+	**SHSU** 42–27	15,080	
November 11	3:30 p.m.	**FIU**	**Middle Tennessee**	Johnny "Red" Floyd Stadium • Murfreesboro, TN	ESPN+	**MTSU** 40–6	11,111	
November 11	3:30 p.m.	**New Mexico State**	**Western Kentucky**	Houchens Industries–L. T. Smith Stadium • Bowling Green, KY	ESPN+	**NMSU** 38–29	16,319	
^{#}Rankings from College Football Playoff. All times are in Eastern Time.

=== Week 12 ===
Date	Time	Visiting team	Home team	Site	TV	Result	Attendance	Ref.
November 18	1:00 p.m.	UMass	**Liberty**	Williams Stadium • Lynchburg, VA	ESPN+	**W** 49–25	16,860	
November 18	2:00 p.m.	**Louisiana Tech**	**Jacksonville State**	Burgess–Snow Field at JSU Stadium • Jacksonville, AL	ESPN+	**JVST** 56–17	20,252	
November 18	2:00 p.m.	**UTEP**	**Middle Tennessee**	Johnny "Red" Floyd Stadium • Murfreesboro, TN	ESPN+	**MTSU** 34–30	9,122	
November 18	3:30 p.m.	**Sam Houston**	**Western Kentucky**	Houchens Industries–L. T. Smith Stadium • Bowling Green, KY	ESPN+	**WKU** 28–23	11,041	
November 18	4:00 p.m.	**New Mexico State**	Auburn	Jordan–Hare Stadium • Auburn, AL	SECN	**W** 31–10	88,043	
November 18	7:30 p.m.	**FIU**	Arkansas	Donald W. Reynolds Razorback Stadium • Fayetteville, AR	ESPNU	**L** 20–44	61,442	
^{#}Rankings from College Football Playoff. All times are in Eastern Time.

=== Week 13 ===
Date	Time	Visiting team	Home team	Site	TV	Result	Attendance	Ref.
November 25	12:00 p.m.	**Middle Tennessee**	**Sam Houston**	Bowers Stadium • Huntsville, TX	ESPN+	**SHSU** 23–20	5,349	
November 25	3:00 p.m.	**Western Kentucky**	**FIU**	Riccardo Silva Stadium • Westchester, FL	ESPN+	**WKU** 41–28	12,724	
November 25	3:30 p.m.	No. 25 **Liberty**	**UTEP**	Sun Bowl • El Paso, TX	CBSSN	**LIB** 42–28	10,240	
November 25	4:00 p.m.	**Jacksonville State**	**New Mexico State**	Aggie Memorial Stadium • Las Cruces, NM	ESPN+	**NMSU** 20–17	15,702	
^{#}Rankings from College Football Playoff. All times are in Eastern Time.

=== Conference USA Championship Game ===
Date	Time	Visiting team	Home team	Site	TV	Result	Attendance	Ref.
December 1	7:00 p.m.	**New Mexico State**	No. 24 **Liberty**	Williams Stadium • Lynchburg, VA (Conference USA Championship Game)	CBSSN	**LIB** 49–35	20,077	
^{#}Rankings from College Football Playoff. All times are in Eastern Time.

== Postseason ==
=== Bowl Games ===
Legend
CUSA win
CUSA loss

Bowl game	Date	Site	Television	Time (EST)	CUSA team	Opponent	Score	Attendance
New Orleans Bowl	December 16	Caesars Superdome • New Orleans, LA	ESPN	2:15 p.m.	Jacksonville State	Louisiana	W 34–31^{OT}	14,485
New Mexico Bowl	December 16	University Stadium • Albuquerque, NM	ESPN	5:45 p.m.	New Mexico State	Fresno State	L 10–37	30,822
Famous Toastery Bowl	December 18	Jerry Richardson Stadium • Charlotte, NC	ESPN	2:30 p.m.	Western Kentucky	Old Dominion	W 38–35^{OT}	5,632
New Year's Six Bowl
Fiesta Bowl	January 1, 2024	State Farm Stadium • Glendale, AZ	ESPN	1:00 p.m.	No. 23 Liberty	No. 8 Oregon	L 6–45	47,769

Rankings are from Final CFP rankings. All times Eastern Time Zone.

=== Selection of teams ===
- Bowl eligible (4): Liberty, Jacksonville State (Note: Due to a lack of bowl eligible teams, Jacksonville State was deemed bowl eligible despite their two-year postseason ban during their transition from FCS to FBS.), New Mexico State, Western Kentucky
- Bowl ineligible (5): FIU, Louisiana Tech, Middle Tennessee, Sam Houston, UTEP

== Conference USA records vs other conferences ==
2023–2024 records against non-conference foes:

Power Conferences 5	Record
ACC	0–0
Big Ten	0–3
Big 12	0–2
Pac-12	0–1
Notre Dame	0–0
SEC	1–4
Power 5 Total	1–10
Other FBS Conferences	Record
American	2–2
Independents (Excluding Notre Dame)	2–1
MAC	3–0
Mountain West	1–4
Sun Belt	1–2
Other FBS Total	9–9
FCS Opponents	Record
Football Championship Subdivision	8–0
Total Non-Conference Record	18–19

Postseason

Power Five Conferences	Record
ACC	0–0
Big 12	0–0
Big Ten	0–0
Notre Dame	0–0
Pac-12	0–1
SEC	0–0
Power 5 Total	0–1
Other FBS Conferences	Record
American	0–0
Independents (Excluding Notre Dame)	0–0
MAC	0–0
Mountain West	0–1
Sun Belt	2–0
Other FBS Total	2–1
Total Bowl Record	2–2

=== Conference USA vs Power 5 matchups ===
This is a list of games CUSA teams scheduled against power conference teams (ACC, Big 10, Big 12, Pac-12, Notre Dame and SEC). All rankings are from the current AP Poll at the time of the game.

Date	Conference	Visitor	Home	Site	Score
September 2	SEC	Middle Tennessee	No. 4 Alabama	Bryant–Denny Stadium • Tuscaloosa, AL	L 7–56
September 2	Big 12	Sam Houston	BYU	LaVell Edwards Stadium • Provo, UT	L 0–14
September 9	SEC	Middle Tennessee	Missouri	Faurot Field • Columbia, MO	L 19–23
September 9	Big Ten	UTEP	Northwestern	Ryan Field • Evanston, IL	L 7–38
September 16	Pac-12	UTEP	Arizona	Arizona Stadium • Tucson, AZ	L 10–31
September 16	Big Ten	Western Kentucky	No. 6 Ohio State	Ohio Stadium • Columbus, OH	L 10–63
September 23	Big Ten	Louisiana Tech	Nebraska	Memorial Stadium • Lincoln, NE	L 14–28
September 23	Big 12	Sam Houston	Houston	TDECU Stadium • Houston, TX	L 7–38
November 4	SEC	Jacksonville State	South Carolina	Williams–Brice Stadium • Columbia, SC	L 28–38
November 18	SEC	FIU	Arkansas	Donald W. Reynolds Razorback Stadium • Fayetteville, AR	L 20–44
November 18	SEC	New Mexico State	Auburn	Jordan–Hare Stadium • Auburn, AL	W 31–10

=== Conference USA vs Group of Five matchups ===
The following games include CUSA teams competing against teams from the American, MAC, Mountain West, or Sun Belt.

Date	Conference	Visitor	Home	Site	Score
September 2	American	Louisiana Tech	SMU	Gerald J. Ford Stadium • University Park, TX	L 14–38
September 2	MAC	Bowling Green	Liberty	Williams Stadium • Lynchburg, VA	W 34–24
September 2	American	South Florida	Western Kentucky	Houchens Industries–L. T. Smith Stadium • Bowling Green, KY	W 41–24
September 9	American	North Texas	FIU	Riccardo Silva Stadium • Westchester, FL	W 46–39
September 9	Sun Belt	Jacksonville State	Coastal Carolina	Brooks Stadium • Conway, SC	L 16–30
September 9	Mountain West	Air Force	Sam Houston	NRG Stadium • Houston, TX	L 3–13
September 16	American	North Texas	Louisiana Tech	Joe Aillet Stadium • Ruston, LA	L 37–40
September 16	MAC	Liberty	Buffalo	UB Stadium • Amherst, NY	W 55–27
September 16	Mountain West	New Mexico State	New Mexico	University Stadium • Albuquerque, NM	W 27–17
September 23	MAC	Eastern Michigan	Jacksonville State	Burgess–Snow Field at JSU Stadium • Jacksonville, AL	W 21–0
September 23	Mountain West	Colorado State	Middle Tennessee	Johnny "Red" Floyd Stadium • Murfreesboro, TN	L 23–31
September 23	Mountain West	New Mexico State	Hawaii	Clarence T. C. Ching Athletics Complex • Honolulu, HI	L 17–20
September 23	Mountain West	UNLV	UTEP	Sun Bowl • El Paso, TX	L 28–45
September 23	Sun Belt	Western Kentucky	Troy	Veterans Memorial Stadium • Troy, AL	L 24–27
November 11	Sun Belt	Old Dominion	Liberty	Williams Stadium • Lynchburg, VA	W 38–10

=== Conference USA vs FBS independents matchups ===
The following games include CUSA teams competing against FBS Independents, which includes Army, UConn, or UMass.

Date	Visitor	Home	Site	Score
August 26	UMass	New Mexico State	Aggie Memorial Stadium • Las Cruces, NM	L 30–41
September 16	FIU	UConn	Rentschler Field • East Hartford, CT	W 24–17
November 18	UMass	Liberty	Williams Stadium • Lynchburg, VA	W 49–25

=== Conference USA vs FCS matchups ===
Date	Visitor	Home	Site	Score
September 2	Maine	FIU	Riccardo Silva Stadium • Westchester, FL	W 14–12
September 2	East Tennessee State	Jacksonville State	Burgess–Snow Field at JSU Stadium • Jacksonville, AL	W 49–3
September 2	Western Illinois	New Mexico State	Aggie Memorial Stadium • Las Cruces, NM	W 58–21
September 2	Incarnate Word	UTEP	Sun Bowl • El Paso, TX	W 28–14
September 9	Northwestern State	Louisiana Tech	Joe Aillet Stadium • Ruston, LA	W 51–21
September 9	Houston Christian	Western Kentucky	Houchens Industries–L. T. Smith Stadium • Bowling Green, KY	W 52–22
September 16	Murray State	Middle Tennessee	Johnny "Red" Floyd Stadium • Murfreesboro, TN	W 35–14
November 4	Kennesaw State	Sam Houston	Bower Stadium • Huntsville, TX	W 24–21

== Awards and honors ==
=== Player of the week honors ===
Week	Offensive			Defensive			Special Teams		
Week	Player	Team	Position	Player	Team	Position	Player	Team	Position
Week 0	Smoke Harris	Louisiana Tech	WR	Jeremiah Harris	Jacksonville State	S	Jack Dawson	Jacksonville State	P
Week 1	Kris Mitchell	FIU	WR	JaQues Evans	Western Kentucky	LB	Lucas Carneiro	Western Kentucky	K
Week 2	Kejon Owens	FIU	RB	Tyrice Knight	UTEP	LB	Jacob Barnes	Louisiana Tech	K
Week 3	Kaidon Salter	Liberty	QB	Sam Brumfield	Middle Tennessee	LB	Ethan Albertson	New Mexico State	K
Week 4	Kaidon Salter (2)	Liberty	QB	Chris Hardie	Jacksonville State	DL	Jack Dawson (2)	Jacksonville State	P
Week 5	Logan Smothers	Jacksonville State	QB	Bryson Washington	Western Kentucky	LB	Smoke Harris	Louisiana Tech	PR
Week 6	Malachi Corley	Western Kentucky	WR	Chris Hardie (2)	Jacksonville State	DL	Max Morgan	Liberty	P
Week 7	Diego Pavia	New Mexico State	QB	Maurice Westmoreland	UTEP	DL	Joshua Sloan	UTEP	P
Week 8	Zion Webb	Jacksonville State	QB	Reggie Peterson	FIU	LB	Alen Karajic	Jacksonville State	K
Week 9	Kaidon Salter (3)	Liberty	QB	Jaylen "J-Rock" Swain	Jacksonville State	DL	Buzz Flabiano	UTEP	K
Week 10	Quinton Cooley	Liberty	RB	Da'Marcus Crosby	Sam Houston	DB	Colby Sessums	Sam Houston	K
Week 11	Kaidon Salter (4)	Liberty	QB	Kavian Gaither	Sam Houston	LB	Ethan Albertson (2)	New Mexico State	K
Week 12	Diego Pavia (2)	New Mexico State	QB	Gabe Peterson	New Mexico State	LB	Kekoura Tarnue	Jacksonville State	DB
Week 13	Austin Reed	Western Kentucky	QB	Trevor Williams	Sam Houston	LB	Ethan Albertson (3)	New Mexico State	K

=== Conference USA Individual Awards ===
The following individuals received postseason honors as chosen by the league's head coaches.

Award	Player	School
Most Valuable Player	Kaidon Salter, QB	Liberty
Offensive Player of the Year	Diego Pavia, QB	New Mexico State
Defensive Player of the Year	Tyren Dupree, LB	Liberty
Special Teams Player of the Year	Ethan Albertson, PK	New Mexico State
Freshman of the Year	Michael Richard, DB	Louisiana Tech
Newcomer of the Year	Quinton Cooley, RB	Liberty
Coach of the Year	Jamey Chadwell; Jerry Kill	Liberty; New Mexico State

=== All-Conference Teams ===
The following list contains players selected as members of the 2023 All-Conference Teams.

Position	Player	Team
First Team Offense
WR	Smoke Harris	Louisiana Tech
WR	Kelly Akharaiyi	UTEP
WR	Malachi Corley	Western Kentucky
OL	X’Zauvea Gadlin	Liberty
OL	Andrew Meyer	UTEP
OL	Keylan Rutledge	Middle Tennessee
OL	Shiyazh Pete	New Mexico State
OL	Elijah Klein	UTEP
TE	Holden Willis	Middle Tennessee
QB	Kaidon Salter	Liberty
RB	Quinton Cooley	Liberty
RB	Malik Jackson	Jacksonville State
First Team Defense
DE	Maurice Westmoreland	UTEP
DE	Chris Hardie	Jacksonville State
DT	Sterling Webb	New Mexico State
DT	Jordan Guerad	FIU
LB	Tyrice Knight	UTEP
LB	Tyren Dupree	Liberty
LB	Trevor Williams	Sam Houston
DB	Willie Roberts	Louisiana Tech
DB	Kobe Singleton	Liberty
DB	Brylan Green	Liberty
DB	Da’Marcus Crosby	Sam Houston
First Team Special Teams
K	Ethan Albertson	New Mexico State
P	Blake Ochsendorf	Louisiana Tech
LS	Brody Butler	Middle Tennessee
KR	Aaron Bedgood	Liberty
PR	Smoke Harris	Louisiana Tech

Position	Player	Team
Second Team Offense
WR	Kris Mitchell	FIU
WR	CJ Daniels	Liberty
WR	Elijah Metcalf	Middle Tennessee
OL	Jonathan Graham	Liberty
OL	Jordan White	Liberty
OL	Treylen Brown	Jacksonville State
OL	Clay Webb	Jacksonville State
OL	Canaan Yarro	New Mexico State
TE	Sean Brown	Jacksonville State
QB	Diego Pavia	New Mexico State
RB	Deion Hankins	UTEP
RB	Star Thomas	New Mexico State
Second Team Defense
DE	Praise Amaewhule	UTEP
DE	Quindarius Dunnigan	Middle Tennessee
DT	Hosea Wheeler	Western Kentucky
DT	Jay Hardy	Liberty
LB	Donovan Manuel	FIU
LB	Sam Brumfield	Middle Tennessee
LB	Keyshaun Elliott	New Mexico State
DB	Kendrick Simpkins	Western Kentucky
DB	Teldrick Ross	Middle Tennessee
DB	Jeremiah Harris	Jacksonville State
DB	Derek Carter	Jacksonville State
Second Team Special Teams
K	Jacob Barnes	Louisiana Tech
P	Joshua Sloan	UTEP
LS	Charlie Eberle	New Mexico State
KR	Demarcus Griffin-Taylor	Louisiana Tech
PR	Dean Patterson	FIU

=== All-Americans ===
Currently, the NCAA compiles consensus all-America teams in the sports of Division I-FBS football and Division I men's basketball using a point system computed from All-America teams named by coaches associations or media sources. The system consists of three points for a first-team honor, two points for second-team honor, and one point for third-team honor. Honorable mention and fourth team or lower recognitions are not accorded any points. College Football All-American consensus teams are compiled by position and the player accumulating the most points at each position is named first team consensus all-American. Currently, the NCAA recognizes All-Americans selected by the AP, AFCA, FWAA, TSN, and the WCFF to determine Consensus and Unanimous All-Americans. Any player named to the First Team by all five of the NCAA-recognized selectors is deemed a Unanimous All-American.

Position	Player	School	Selector	Unanimous	Consensus
Second Team All-Americans
OL	Clay Webb	Jacksonville State	AP, PFF, USAT, WCFF		
S	Brylan Green	Liberty	FWAA		

== NFL draft ==
The NFL draft will be held at Campus Martius Park in Detroit. The following list includes all C-USA players in the draft.

=== List of selections ===
Player	Position	School	Draft Round	Round Pick	Overall Pick	Team
Malachi Corley	WR	Western Kentucky	3	1	65	New York Jets
Tyrice Knight	LB	UTEP	4	18	118	Seattle Seahawks
Elijah Klein	OG	UTEP	6	44	220	Tampa Bay Buccaneers
