= 2023 New Mexico State Aggies football team =

American college football season

2023 New Mexico State Aggies football

C-USA Championship, L 35–49 vs. Liberty

New Mexico Bowl, L 10–37 vs. Fresno State
- Conference: Conference USA
- Record: 10–5 (7–1 C-USA)
- Head coach: Jerry Kill (2nd season)
- Offensive coordinator: Tim Beck (2nd season)
- Offensive scheme: Pistol
- Co-defensive coordinators: Nate Dreiling (2nd season); Melvin Rice (2nd season)
- Base defense: 3–3–5
- Home stadium: Aggie Memorial Stadium

2023 Conference USA football standings
	Conf.			Overall
Team	W		L	W		L
No. 25 Liberty y$	8	–	0	13	–	1
New Mexico State y	7	–	1	10	–	5
Jacksonville State*	6	–	2	9	–	4
Western Kentucky	5	–	3	8	–	5
Middle Tennessee	3	–	5	4	–	8
UTEP	2	–	6	3	–	9
Sam Houston*	2	–	6	3	–	9
Louisiana Tech	2	–	6	3	–	9
FIU	1	–	7	4	–	8
Championship: Liberty 49, New Mexico State 35
$ – Conference champion; y – Championship game participant; * – Ineligible for postseason play due to FCS-to-FBS transition rules; Rankings from AP Poll

The 2023 New Mexico State Aggies football team represented New Mexico State University in the 2023 NCAA Division I FBS football season. The Aggies played their home games at Aggie Memorial Stadium in Las Cruces, New Mexico, and competed as a first-year member of Conference USA. They were led by second-year head coach Jerry Kill.

The season was one of the most successful in decades for the Aggies, as a win over Western Kentucky on November 11 gave New Mexico State their first eight-win season since 1965 and a six-game winning streak, their longest since 1960. The victory also clinched a spot in the Conference USA Championship Game in the Aggies' first season in the conference. One week later, as 23.5-point underdogs, New Mexico State upset Auburn 31–10, the program's first-ever win over an SEC team.

The Aggies also clinched bowl eligibility in back-to-back seasons for the first time since playing in the Sun Bowl following the 1959 and 1960 seasons.

The New Mexico State Aggies football team drew an average home attendance of 14,847 in 2023.

== Preseason ==
=== Conference USA media poll ===
Conference USA media poll
Predicted finish	Team	Votes (1st place)
1	Western Kentucky	(18)
2	Liberty	(4)
3	Middle Tennessee	
4	Louisiana Tech	
5	New Mexico State	
6	UTEP	
7	Jacksonville State	
T8	FIU	
T8	Sam Houston	

== Schedule ==
New Mexico State and Conference USA announced the 2023 football schedule on January 10, 2023.

Date	Time	Opponent	Site	TV	Result	Attendance
August 26	5:00 p.m.	UMass*	Aggie Memorial Stadium; Las Cruces, NM	ESPN	L 30–41	15,356
September 2	7:00 p.m.	Western Illinois*	Aggie Memorial Stadium; Las Cruces, NM	ESPN+	W 58–21	17,943
September 9	4:00 p.m.	at Liberty	Williams Stadium; Lynchburg, VA	ESPN+	L 17–33	20,123
September 16	6:00 p.m.	at New Mexico*	University Stadium; Albuquerque, NM (Rio Grande Rivalry)	MW Network	W 27–17	27,414
September 23	10:00 p.m.	at Hawaii*	Clarence T. C. Ching Athletics Complex; Honolulu, HI	SPEC PPV	L 17–20	10,254
October 4	7:00 p.m.	FIU	Aggie Memorial Stadium; Las Cruces, NM	CBSSN	W 34–17	11,540
October 11	7:00 p.m.	Sam Houston	Aggie Memorial Stadium; Las Cruces, NM	CBSSN	W 27–13	12,812
October 18	7:00 p.m.	at UTEP	Sun Bowl; El Paso, TX (Battle of I-10)	ESPN2	W 28–7	19,727
October 24	5:00 p.m.	at Louisiana Tech	Joe Aillet Stadium; Ruston, LA	CBSSN	W 27–24	13,798
November 4	4:00 p.m.	Middle Tennessee^{†}	Aggie Memorial Stadium; Las Cruces, NM	ESPN+	W 13–7	15,727
November 11	1:30 p.m.	at Western Kentucky	Houchens Industries–L. T. Smith Stadium; Bowling Green, KY	ESPN+	W 38–29	16,319
November 18	2:00 p.m.	at Auburn*	Jordan–Hare Stadium; Auburn, AL	SECN	W 31–10	88,043
November 25	2:00 p.m.	Jacksonville State	Aggie Memorial Stadium; Las Cruces, NM	ESPN+	W 20–17	15,702
December 1	5:00 p.m.	at No. 24 Liberty*	Williams Stadium; Lynchburg, VA (C-USA Championship Game)	CBSSN	L 35–49	20,077
December 16	3:45 p.m.	vs. Fresno State*	University Stadium; Albuquerque, NM (New Mexico Bowl)	ESPN	L 10–37	30,822
*Non-conference game; ^{†}Homecoming; Rankings from AP Poll (and CFP Rankings, after November 1) - Released prior to game; All times are in Mountain time

Schedule source:

== Personnel ==
2023 New Mexico State Aggies football team roster
Players
Coaches
Offense

Pos.	#	Name	Class
WR	0	P. J. Johnson III	So
WR	1	Chris Bellamy	Sr
WR	2	Ta'ir Brooks	Jr
RB	3	Jamoni Jones	Jr
RB	4	Star Thomas	Jr
WR	5	Bryce Childress	Jr
WR	6	Jonathan Brady	So
QB	7	Eli Stowers	So
RB	8	Monte Watkins	So
QB	9	Blaze Berlowitz	Fr
TE	9	Kareem Burgess	Sr
QB	10	Diego Pavia	Jr
WR	11	Kordell David	Jr
WR	12	Jordan Smith	Jr
QB	13	Gavin Frakes	So
WR	14	Trent Hudson	Jr
RB	16	Larenzo McMillan	So
WR	17	Donovan Faupel	Fr
WR	18	Jordin Parker	Jr
TE	19	Ron Tiavaasue	Sr
RB	20	Tim Gans	So
WR	21	Isaiah Abeyta	Fr
RB	22	Makhilyn Young	Fr
QB	23	Jeff Davison	So
RB	24	Noah Triplett	Fr
WR	25	Jayden Bell	Fr
QB	28	Paul Cieremans	Fr
WR	29	Kaden Trevino	Fr
RB	30	Dailan Goodman	Fr
RB	34	David Barela	Fr
WR	36	Ethan Singleton	So
RB	37	Isaiah Rudison	Fr
OL	50	Cooper Sheehan	Fr
OL	51	A. J. Vaipulu	So
OL	54	Isaiah Mursalat	Jr
OL	55	Shamarr Jackson	So
OL	56	Canaan Yarro	Jr
OL	60	Quinton Fowler	Jr
OL	61	B. J. Tolo	Fr
OL	63	Jack Gogue	Fr
OL	65	Anthony LaFrance	Jr
OL	66	Louie Canepa	Fr
OL	70	Kaden Stanton	Fr
OL	71	Shiyazh Pete	So
OL	72	Jai Rodriguez	Fr
OL	74	Gannon Lauer	Fr
OL	76	Kai Sevy	Fr
OL	77	Jacob Golden	Jr
OL	78	Cedric Claiborne	Jr
WR	81	Allen Ortiz	Jr
WR	82	Miles McWhorter	So
WR	83	Jaylen Watkins	Fr
TE	85	Thomas Whitford	Sr
TE	86	Jerry Lydiatt	Fr
TE	87	Mason Graham	Fr
TE	88	Trevor Stephens	So

Defense

Pos.	#	Name	Class
CB	0	Reggie Akles	So
S	1	Devlin Kirklin	Sr
S	2	Malachi McLean	So
DT	3	Dion Wilson Jr.	Jr
CB	4	B. J. Sculark	Sr
S	5	J. J. Dervil	Jr
CB	7	Keonte Gilton	Jr
CB	8	Andre Seldon	So
DT	9	Denver Warren	So
DT	10	Gabriel Iniguez	So
S	11	Dylan Early	Jr
CB	12	Rashad McKinley	Fr
S	13	Myles Rowser	So
ILB	14	Sone Aupiu	Fr
S	15	Torren Union	Jr
OLB	16	Gabe Peterson	So
S	17	Tayden Barnes	Fr
ILB	17	Jamari Buddin	So
ILB	17	Justin Stinson	So
OLB	18	Amari Pouncy	So
S	19	Jeremiah Vessel	Fr
S	20	Mehki Miller	Jr
ILB	21	Jayvhion Gipson	So
CB	22	Josiah Charles	Fr
CB	23	Naeten Mitchell	Fr
S	24	Jordan Vincent	Jr
ILB	25	Jaxon Heil	So
DT	26	Sterling Webb	So
DE	28	Jaden Robinson	Fr
CB	29	Rashad McKinley	Fr
S	30	Randy Robinson	Sr
S	31	Elijah Thomas	Fr
S	32	Siddeeq Shabazz	Fr
ILB	34	Pierce Humpich	Fr
ILB	35	Tyler Martinez	So
S	36	Angel Muñoz	Fr
CB	39	Isaac Gallegos	So
OLB	40	Buddha Peleti	So
ILB	41	Ishmael Aceves	Fr
OLB	42	Noah Arinze	So
ILB	43	Justin Stinson	So
LB	44	Keyshaun Elliott	So
ILB	45	Quincy Davis	Fr
ILB	46	Demetrius Warren Jr.	Jr
ILB	47	Jalen Brown	Fr
OLB	48	Adam Parks	Fr
ILB	50	Hudson Voggesser	Fr
ILB	51	R. J. Chakolis	Fr
OLB	52	Zyier Thornton	Jr
LB	53	Tobin Hackett	So
LB	57	Bryant Jackson	Sr
DL	58	Sioeli Helu	So
DL	59	Deven Dyer	Fr
DL	93	Tyriece Thomas	Jr
DL	94	Marcus Buckley	GS
DT	95	Gabe Jones	Fr
DT	96	Garrett Bishop	Jr
DL	98	Izaiah Reed	Sr
OLB	99	Nikhil Webb Walker	So

Special teams

Pos.	#	Name	Class
K	35	Freddy Joya	Fr
LS	64	Logan MacGregor	So
LS	68	Zachary Haber	Fr
K	84	Ethan Albertson	Sr
K	89	Brad Ling	Fr
P	90	Zach Haynes	Sr
LS	91	Charlie Eberle	Jr
P	92	George Eberle	Sr
K	95	Jorge Figueroa	Jr
K	97	Carson Zilmer	So

Head coach

- Jerry Kill

Coordinators/assistant coaches

- Tim Beck
  Assistant head coach/Offensive coordinator
- Nate Dreiling
  Co-defensive coordinator
- Melvin Rice
  Co-defensive coordinator/Safeties
- Andrew Mitchell
  Offensive line
- Tyler Wright
  Special teams coordinator/Tight ends
- Tony Sanchez
  Wide receivers
- Ghaali Muhammad-Lankford
  Running backs
- Chuka Ndulue
  Defensive line
- Bobby McMillen
  Inside linebackers
- Cliff Odom
  Defensive backs

Legend

- (C) Team captain
- (S) Suspended
- (I) Ineligible
- Injured
- Redshirt

Roster
Last update: August 27, 2023

== Game summaries ==
=== UMass ===
UMass Minutemen at New Mexico State Aggies – Game summary

Quarter	1	2	3	4	Total
Minutemen	7	3	3	28	41
Aggies	0	10	0	20	30

at Aggie Memorial Stadium, Las Cruces, New Mexico

- Date: August 26
- Game time: 5:00 p.m. MDT
- Game weather: Sunny, 95 °F (35 °C)
- Game attendance: 15,356
- Referee: Rory Bernard
- TV announcers (ESPN): John Schriffen, Rocky Boiman, and Dawn Davenport
- Box score, Recap

Game information
First quarter
- MASS – Anthony Simpson 10-yard run (Cameron Carson kick), 10:20. Minutemen 7–0. Drive: 3 plays, 35 yards, 1:08.

Second quarter

- NMSU – Monte Watkins 80-yard run (Ethan Albertson kick), 8:34. Tied 7–7. Drive: 2 plays, 85 yards, 0:58.
- MASS – Cameron Carson 33-yard field goal, 3:55. Minutemen 10–7. Drive: 9 plays, 61 yards, 4:39.
- NMSU – Ethan Albertson 36-yard field goal, 0:03. Tied 10–10. Drive: 9 plays, 58 yards, 3:55.

Third quarter

- MASS – Cameron Carson 29-yard field goal, 6:27. Minutemen 13–10. Drive: 11 plays, 55 yards, 6:16.

Fourth quarter

- MASS – Taisun Phommachanh 11-yard run (Cameron Carson kick), 14:28. Minutemen 20–10. Drive: 3 plays, 80 yards, 0:47.
- NMSU – Trent Hudson 42-yard pass from Diego Pavia (Ethan Albertson kick), 13:27. Minutemen 20–17. Drive: 3 plays, 79 yards, 1:01.
- MASS – Kay'Ron Lynch-Adams 10-yard run (Cameron Carson kick), 7:47. Minutemen 27–17. Drive: 10 plays, 75 yards, 5:40.
- MASS – Isaiah Rutherford 57-yard interception return (Cameron Carson kick), 6:40. Minutemen 34–17.
- NMSU – Jordin Parker 40-yard pass from Diego Pavia (Ethan Albertson kick), 4:35. Minutemen 34–24. Drive: 8 plays, 75 yards, 2:05.
- MASS – Kay'Ron Lynch-Adams 21-yard run (Cameron Carson kick), 1:43. Minutemen 41–24. Drive: 2 plays, 24 yards, 0:53.
- NMSU – Trent Hudson 1-yard pass from Diego Pavia, 0:00. Minutemen 41–30. Drive: 9 plays, 75 yards, 1:43.

Statistics	MASS	NMSU
First downs	16	22
Total yards	389	468
Rushing yards	197	220
Passing yards	192	248
Turnovers	0	3
Time of possession	28:20	31:43

Team	Category	Player	Statistics
UMass	Passing	Taisun Phommachanh	10/17, 192 yards
UMass	Rushing	Taisun Phommachanh	16 rushes, 92 yards, TD
UMass	Receiving	Christian Wells	1 reception, 68 yards
New Mexico State	Passing	Diego Pavia	16/27, 248 yards, 3 TD, 2 INT
New Mexico State	Rushing	Monte Watkins	2 rushes, 95 yards, TD
New Mexico State	Receiving	Jonathan Brady	2 receptions, 48 yards

=== Western Illinois ===
Western Illinois Leathernecks at New Mexico State Aggies – Game summary

Quarter	1	2	3	4	Total
Leathernecks	0	14	7	0	21
Aggies	6	14	17	21	58

at Aggie Memorial Stadium, Las Cruces, New Mexico

- Date: September 2
- Game time: 7:00 p.m. MDT
- Game weather: Sunny, 93 °F (34 °C)
- Game attendance: 17,943
- Referee: Rodney Burnette
- TV announcers (ESPN+): Adam Young, Danny Knee, and Tatiana Favela
- Box score, Recap

Game information
First quarter
- NMSU – Star Thomas 20-yard run (kick failed), 11:29. Aggies 6–0. Drive: 7 plays, 70 yards, 3:24.

Second quarter

- NMSU – Eli Stowers 4-yard run (Ethan Albertson kick), 14:53. Aggies 13–0. Drive: 11 plays, 81 yards, 5:15.
- WIU – Jaylin Jackson 5-yard pass from Matt Morrissey (Owen Valek kick), 8:42. Aggies 13–7. Drive: 12 plays, 75 yards, 6:11.
- NMSU – Monte Walkins 5-yard run (Ethan Albertson kick), 2:23. Aggies 20–7. Drive: 11 plays, 78 yards, 6:11.
- WIU – Ludovick Choquette 21-yard run (Owen Valek kick), 0:05. Aggies 20–14. Drive: 10 plays, 75 yards, 2:18.

Third quarter

- NMSU – Ethan Albertson 37-yard field goal, 11:34. Aggies 23–14. Drive: 7 plays, 41 yards, 2:21.
- NMSU – Bryce Childress 75-yard pass from Diego Pavia (Ethan Albertson kick), 7:58. Aggies 30–14. Drive: 2 plays, 82 yards, 0:33.
- NMSU – Jonathan Brady 80-yard pass from Diego Pavia (Ethan Albertson kick), 4:38. Aggies 37–14. Drive: 1 play, 80 yards, 0:12.
- WIU – Donald McKinney 26-yard pass from Matt Morrissey (Owen Valek kick), 2:38. Aggies 37–21. Drive: 4 plays, 75 yards, 2:00.

Fourth quarter

- NMSU – Star Thomas 25-yard run (Ethan Albertson kick), 11:18. Aggies 44–21. Drive: 11 plays, 75 yards, 6:20.
- NMSU – Jordan Parker 63-yard pass from Eli Stowers (Ethan Albertson kick), 8:49. Aggies 51–21. Drive: 2 plays, 65 yards, 0:51.
- NMSU – Makhilyn Young 3-yard run (Ethan Albertson kick), 4:13. Aggies 58–21. Drive: 5 plays, 61 yards, 2:45.

Statistics	WIU	NMSU
First downs	17	26
Total yards	278	650
Rushing yards	36	270
Passing yards	242	380
Turnovers	0	0
Time of possession	27:05	32:55

Team	Category	Player	Statistics
Western Illinois	Passing	Matt Morrissey	17/31, 242 yards, 2 TD
Western Illinois	Rushing	Ludovick Choquette	11 rushes, 37 yards, TD
Western Illinois	Receiving	Seth Glatz	3 receptions, 73 yards
New Mexico State	Passing	Diego Pavia	16/20, 317 yards, 2 TD
New Mexico State	Rushing	Star Thomas	12 rushes, 96 yards, 2 TD
New Mexico State	Receiving	Jonathan Brady	4 receptions, 102 yards, TD

=== at Liberty ===
New Mexico State Aggies at Liberty Flames – Game summary

Quarter	1	2	3	4	Total
Aggies	7	10	0	0	17
Flames	7	16	10	0	33

at Williams Stadium, Lynchburg, Virginia

- Date: September 9
- Game time: 4:00 p.m. MDT/6:00 p.m. EDT
- Game weather: Cloudy, 71 °F (22 °C)
- Game attendance: 20,123
- Referee: Ron Hudson
- TV announcers (ESPN+): Matt Warner, Joe Jauch, and Emily Austen
- Box score, Recap

Game information
First quarter
- NMSU – Jamoni Jones 10-yard run (Ethan Albertson kick), 11:22. Aggies 7–0. Drive: 6 plays, 75 yards, 3:38.
- LIB – C. J. Daniels 40-yard pass from Kaidon Salter (Teagan Lenderink kick), 2:08. Tied 7–7. Drive: 6 plays, 71 yards, 3:15.

Second quarter

- NMSU – Ethan Albertson 35-yard field goal, 12:32. Aggies 10–7. Drive: 10 plays, 69 yards, 4:30.
- LIB – Kaidon Salter 3-yard run (kick blocked), 8:40. Flames 13–10. Drive: 8 plays, 75 yards, 3:52.
- NMSU – Trent Hudson 13-yard pass from Diego Pavia (Ethan Albertson kick), 5:18. Aggies 17–13. Drive: 6 plays, 75 yards, 3:22.
- LIB – Bentley Hanshaw 24-yard pass from Kaidon Salter (Nick Brown kick), 2:13. Flames 20–17. Drive: 7 plays, 75 yards, 3:05.
- LIB – Teagan Lenderink 22-yard field goal, 0:16. Flames 23–17. Drive: 10 plays, 80 yards, 1:32.

Third quarter

- LIB – Kaidon Salter 2-yard run (Nick Brown kick), 5:57. Flames 30–17. Drive: 17 plays, 75 yards, 9:03.
- LIB – Teagan Lenderink 29-yard field goal, 1:24. Flames 33–17. Drive: 8 plays, 22 yards, 3:02.

Fourth quarter

- No scoring plays

Statistics	NMSU	LIB
First downs	16	26
Total yards	339	526
Rushing yards	170	250
Passing yards	169	276
Turnovers	3	1
Time of possession	22:06	37:54

Team	Category	Player	Statistics
New Mexico State	Passing	Diego Pavia	12/21, 150 yards, TD, 2 INT
New Mexico State	Rushing	Diego Pavia	9 rushes, 63 yards
New Mexico State	Receiving	Chris Bellamy	3 receptions, 74 yards
Liberty	Passing	Kaidon Salter	15/25, 276 yards, 2 TD
Liberty	Rushing	Quinton Cooley	20 rushes, 106 yards
Liberty	Receiving	C. J. Daniels	4 receptions, 129 yards, TD

=== At New Mexico ===
New Mexico State Aggies at New Mexico Lobos – Game summary

Quarter	1	2	3	4	Total
Aggies	0	17	3	7	27
Lobos	3	7	0	7	17

at University Stadium, Albuquerque, New Mexico

- Date: September 16
- Game time: 6:00 p.m. MDT
- Game weather: Clear, 80 °F (27 °C)
- Game attendance: 27,414
- Referee: Jonathan Noli
- TV announcers (MW Network): Jeff Siembieda and George Carter
- Box score, Recap

Game information
First quarter
- UNM – Luke Drzewiecki 25-yard field goal, 8:25. Lobos 3–0. Drive: 12 plays, 78 yards, 6:29.

Second quarter

- NMSU – Star Thomas 2-yard run (Ethan Albertson kick), 13:32. Aggies 7–3. Drive: 10 plays, 88 yards, 5:18.
- UNM – Jacory Croskey-Merritt 1-yard run (Luke Drzewiecki kick), 9:01. Lobos 10–7. Drive: 7 plays, 75 yards, 4:31.
- NMSU – Ethan Albertson 26-yard field goal, 4:31. Tied 10–10. Drive: 8 plays, 66 yards, 4:30.
- NMSU – Jonathan Brady 31-yard pass from Diego Pavia (Ethan Albertson kick), 0:41. Aggies 17–10. Drive: 6 plays, 63 yards, 2:08.

Third quarter

- NMSU – Ethan Albertson 47-yard field goal, 1:17. Aggies 20–10. Drive: 12 plays, 61 yards, 8:08.

Fourth quarter

- UNM – Andrew Erickson 1-yard pass from Dylan Hopkins (Luke Drzewiecki kick), 10:16. Aggies 20–17. Drive: 11 plays, 75 yards, 6:01.
- NMSU – Jonathan Brady 75-yard pass from Diego Pavia (Ethan Albertson kick), 10:06. Aggies 27–17. Drive: 1 play, 75 yards, 0:10.

Statistics	NMSU	UNM
First downs	15	26
Total yards	397	401
Rushing yards	177	154
Passing yards	220	247
Turnovers	0	1
Time of possession	27:53	32:07

Team	Category	Player	Statistics
New Mexico State	Passing	Diego Pavia	9/14, 203 yards, 2 TD
New Mexico State	Rushing	Diego Pavia	11 rushes, 96 yards
New Mexico State	Receiving	Jonathan Brady	3 receptions, 109 yards, 2 TD
New Mexico	Passing	Dylan Hopkins	20/39, 247 yards, TD
New Mexico	Rushing	Jacory Croskey-Merritt	16 rushes, 83 yards, TD
New Mexico	Receiving	Jeremiah Hixon	5 receptions, 45 yards

=== At Hawaii ===
New Mexico State Aggies at Hawaii Rainbow Warriors – Game summary

Quarter	1	2	3	4	Total
Aggies	7	10	0	0	17
Rainbow Warriors	0	3	7	10	20

at Clarence T. C. Ching Athletics Complex, Honolulu, Hawaii

- Date: September 23
- Game time: 10:00 p.m. MDT/6:00 p.m. HDT
- Game weather: Sunny, 79 °F (26 °C)
- Game attendance: 10,254
- Referee: Michael Cuttone
- TV announcers (SPEC PPV): Kanoa Leahey, Rich Miano, and Jordan Helle
- Box score, Recap

Game information
First quarter
- NMSU – Monte Watkins 39-yard pass from Diego Pavia (Ethan Albertson kick), 7:17. Aggies 7–0. Drive: 6 plays, 68 yards, 3:33.

Second quarter

- NMSU – Ethan Albertson 35-yard field goal, 12:06. Aggies 10–0. Drive: 14 plays, 52 yards, 8:15.
- HAW – Matthew Shipley 35-yard field goal, 5:27. Aggies 10–3. Drive: 5 plays, 22 yards, 2:12.
- NMSU – Star Thomas 21-yard pass from Diego Pavia (Ethan Albertson kick), 1:38. Aggies 17–3. Drive: 8 plays, 73 yards, 3:39.

Third quarter

- HAW – Brayden Schager 4-yard run (Matthew Shipley kick), 10:22. Aggies 17–10. Drive: 8 plays, 75 yards, 4:38.

Fourth quarter

- HAW – Koali Nishigaya 3-yard pass from Brayden Schager (Matthew Shipley kick), 7:19. Tied 17–17. Drive: 11 plays, 43 yards, 6:36.
- HAW – Matthew Shipley 24-yard field goal, 0:00. Rainbow Warriors 20–17. Drive: 11 plays, 65 yards, 3:00.

Statistics	NMSU	HAW
First downs	16	21
Total yards	335	343
Rushing yards	180	98
Passing yards	155	245
Turnovers	1	1
Time of possession	26:47	33:13

Team	Category	Player	Statistics
New Mexico State	Passing	Diego Pavia	9/15, 155 yards, 2 TD
New Mexico State	Rushing	Diego Pavia	12 rushes, 97 yards
New Mexico State	Receiving	Jordin Parker	1 reception, 42 yards
Hawaii	Passing	Brayden Schager	26/37, 245 yards, TD
Hawaii	Rushing	Jordan Johnson	9 rushes, 44 yards
Hawaii	Receiving	Pofele Ashlock	7 receptions, 77 yards

=== FIU ===
FIU Panthers at New Mexico State Aggies – Game summary

Quarter	1	2	3	4	Total
Panthers	7	7	3	0	17
Aggies	7	7	3	17	34

at Aggie Memorial Stadium, Las Cruces, New Mexico

- Date: October 4
- Game time: 7:00 p.m. MDT
- Game weather: Cloudy, 79 °F (26 °C)
- Game attendance: 11,540
- Referee: Garrett Dickerson
- TV announcers (CBSSN): Jordan Kent and Donte Whitner
- Box score, Recap

Game information
First quarter
- NMSU – Chris Bellamy 11-yard pass from Diego Pavia (Ethan Albertson kick), 7:18. Aggies 7–0. Drive: 11 plays, 76 yards, 6:34.
- FIU – Keyone Jenkins 6-yard run (Chase Gabriel kick), 4:41. Tied 7–7. Drive: 7 plays, 75 yards, 2:37.

Second quarter

- NMSU – Jordin Parker 49-yard pass from Diego Pavia (Ethan Albertson kick), 8:33. Aggies 14–7. Drive: 5 plays, 78 yards, 2:30.
- FIU – Shomari Lawrence 6-yard run (Chase Gabriel kick), 1:26. Tied 14–14. Drive: 9 plays, 81 yards, 3:24.

Third quarter

- NMSU – Ethan Albertson 23-yard field goal, 7:44. Aggies 17–14. Drive: 12 plays, 70 yards, 7:16.
- FIU – Chase Gabriel 41-yard field goal, 1:01. Tied 17–17. Drive: 12 plays, 61 yards, 6:36.

Fourth quarter

- NMSU – Diego Pavia 43-yard run (Ethan Albertson kick), 14:53. Aggies 24–17. Drive: 3 plays, 75 yards, 1:08.
- NMSU – Star Thomas 3-yard run (Ethan Albertson kick), 10:35. Aggies 31–17. Drive: 4 plays, 61 yards, 1:47.
- NMSU – Ethan Albertson 28-yard field goal, 1:12. Aggies 34–17. Drive: 4 plays, 4 yards, 1:01.

Statistics	FIU	NMSU
First downs	20	21
Total yards	405	439
Rushing yards	87	183
Passing yards	318	256
Turnovers	2	1
Time of possession	28:04	31:56

Team	Category	Player	Statistics
FIU	Passing	Keyone Jenkins	25/32, 258 yards, 2 INT
FIU	Rushing	Kejon Owens	6 rushes, 51 yards
FIU	Receiving	Kris Mitchell	8 receptions, 91 yards
New Mexico State	Passing	Diego Pavia	20/31, 256 yards, 2 TD, INT
New Mexico State	Rushing	Monte Watkins	5 rushes, 89 yards
New Mexico State	Receiving	Jordin Parker	1 reception, 49 yards, TD

=== Sam Houston ===
Sam Houston Bearkats at New Mexico State Aggies – Game summary

Quarter	1	2	3	4	Total
Bearkats	0	0	6	7	13
Aggies	14	13	0	0	27

at Aggie Memorial Stadium, Las Cruces, New Mexico

- Date: October 11
- Game time: 7:00 p.m. MDT
- Game weather: Clear, 80 °F (27 °C)
- Game attendance: 12,812
- Referee: Joe Lehring
- TV announcers (CBSSN): Carter Blackburn and Robert Turbin
- Box score, Recap

Game information
First quarter
- NMSU – Diego Pavia 22-yard run (Ethan Albertson kick), 4:46. Aggies 7–0. Drive: 11 plays, 87 yards, 6:39.
- NMSU – Trent Hudson 78-yard pass from Diego Pavia (Ethan Albertson kick), 1:42. Aggies 14–0. Drive: 2 plays, 80 yards, 0:52.

Second quarter

- NMSU – Ethan Albertson 22-yard field goal, 10:39. Aggies 17–0. Drive: 9 plays, 66 yards, 4:07.
- NMSU – Ethan Albertson 39-yard field goal, 4:18. Aggies 20–0. Drive: 7 plays, 31 yards, 2:29.
- NMSU – Trent Hudson 12-yard pass from Diego Pavia (Ethan Albertson kick), 0:27. Aggies 27–0. Drive: 11 plays, 89 yards, 1:42.

Third quarter

- SHSU – Noah Smith 16-yard pass from Keegan Shoemaker (pass failed), 5:55. Aggies 27–6. Drive: 2 plays, 18 yards, 0:34.

Fourth quarter

- SHSU – Noah Smith 6-yard pass from Keegan Shoemaker (Colby Sessums kick), 12:01. Aggies 27–13. Drive: 6 plays, 70 yards, 2:44.

Statistics	SHSU	NMSU
First downs	19	20
Total yards	367	458
Rushing yards	82	172
Passing yards	285	286
Turnovers	0	0
Time of possession	27:50	32:10

Team	Category	Player	Statistics
Sam Houston	Passing	Keegan Shoemaker	32/48, 285 yards, 2 TD
Sam Houston	Rushing	Keegan Shoemaker	7 rushes, 42 yards
Sam Houston	Receiving	Malik Phillips	10 receptions, 118 yards
New Mexico State	Passing	Diego Pavia	20/36, 286 yards, 2 TD
New Mexico State	Rushing	Diego Pavia	15 rushes, 115 yards, TD
New Mexico State	Receiving	Trent Hudson	3 receptions, 122 yards, 2 TD

=== At UTEP ===
New Mexico State Aggies at UTEP Miners – Game summary

Quarter	1	2	3	4	Total
Aggies	7	0	14	7	28
Miners	0	7	0	0	7

at Sun Bowl, El Paso, Texas

- Date: October 18
- Game time: 7:00 p.m. MDT
- Game weather: Sunny, 81 °F (27 °C)
- Game attendance: 19,727
- Referee: Rory Bernard
- TV announcers (ESPN2): John Schriffen, Cole Cubelic, and Taylor Davis
- Box score, Recap

Game information
First quarter
- NMSU – Diego Pavia 10-yard run (Ethan Albertson kick), 1:18. Aggies 7–0. Drive: 8 plays, 74 yards, 4:49.

Second quarter

- UTEP – Kevin Hurley 1-yard run (Buzz Fabiano kick), 12:26. Tied 7–7. Drive: 7 plays, 75 yards, 3:52.

Third quarter

- NMSU – Thomaz Whitford 6-yard pass from Diego Pavia (Ethan Albertson kick), 12:29. Aggies 14–7. Drive: 5 plays, 69 yards, 2:24.
- NMSU – Diego Pavia 41-yard run (Ethan Albertson kick), 6:44. Aggies 21–7. Drive: 9 plays, 80 yards, 3:59.

Fourth quarter

- NMSU – Thomaz Whitford 16-yard pass from Diego Pavia (Ethan Albertson kick), 13:31. Aggies 28–7. Drive: 7 plays, 53 yards, 3:53.

Statistics	NMSU	UTEP
First downs	23	16
Total yards	439	304
Rushing yards	253	125
Passing yards	186	179
Turnovers	0	0
Time of possession	30:17	29:43

Team	Category	Player	Statistics
New Mexico State	Passing	Diego Pavia	15/25, 186 yards, 2 TD
New Mexico State	Rushing	Monte Watkins	10 rushes, 109 yards
New Mexico State	Receiving	Eli Stowers	5 receptions, 80 yards
UTEP	Passing	Cade McConnell	15/32, 179 yards
UTEP	Rushing	Deion Hankins	16 rushes, 120 yards
UTEP	Receiving	Jeremiah Ballard	5 receptions, 75 yards

=== At Louisiana Tech ===
New Mexico State Aggies at Louisiana Tech Bulldogs – Game summary

Quarter	1	2	3	4	Total
Aggies	0	10	14	3	27
Bulldogs	3	13	8	0	24

at Joe Aillet Stadium, Ruston, Louisiana

- Date: October 24
- Game time: 5:00 p.m. MDT/6:00 p.m. CDT
- Game weather: Sunny
- Game attendance: 13,798
- Referee: Joe Lehring
- TV announcers (CBSSN): Carter Blackburn and Donte Whitner
- Box score, Recap

Game information
First quarter
- LT – Jacob Barnes 42-yard field goal, 8:00. Bulldogs 3–0. Drive: 5 plays, 38 yards, 3:09.

Second quarter

- LT – Hank Bachmeier 1-yard run (kick blocked), 14:56. Bulldogs 9–0. Drive: 12 plays, 72 yards, 6:02.
- NMSU – Ethan Albertson 47-yard field goal, 11:41. Bulldogs 9–3. Drive: 6 plays, 45 yards, 3:15.
- LT – Hank Bachmeier 1-yard run (Jacob Barnes kick), 6:47. Bulldogs 16–3. Drive: 12 plays, 75 yards, 4:54.
- NMSU – Diego Pavia 19-yard run (Ethan Albertson kick), 1:51. Bulldogs 16–10. Drive: 8 plays, 75 yards, 4:56.

Third quarter

- NMSU – Trent Hudson 8-yard pass from Diego Pavia (Ethan Albertson kick), 6:25. Aggies 17–16. Drive: 15 plays, 75 yards, 8:35.
- NMSU – Jamoni Jones 1-yard run (Ethan Albertson kick), 4:59. Aggies 24–16. Drive: 2 plays, 7 yards, 0:28.
- LT – John Locke 3-yard pass from Hank Bachmeier (Hank Bachmeier pass to Smoke Harris), 0:13. Tied 24–24. Drive: 8 plays, 55 yards, 4:37.

Fourth quarter

- NMSU – Ethan Albertson 31-yard field goal, 5:16. Aggies 27–24. Drive: 10 plays, 81 yards, 5:16.

Statistics	NMSU	LT
First downs	16	23
Total yards	327	371
Rushing yards	232	133
Passing yards	95	238
Turnovers	0	2
Time of possession	29:50	30:10

Team	Category	Player	Statistics
New Mexico State	Passing	Diego Pavia	10/19, 95 yards, TD
New Mexico State	Rushing	Star Thomas	10 rushes, 88 yards
New Mexico State	Receiving	Jonathan Brady	2 receptions, 33 yards
Louisiana Tech	Passing	Hank Bachmeier	20/27, 238 yards, TD
Louisiana Tech	Rushing	Keldric Moody	9 rushes, 55 yards
Louisiana Tech	Receiving	Kyle Maxwell	3 receptions, 68 yards

=== Middle Tennessee ===
Middle Tennessee Blue Raiders at New Mexico State Aggies – Game summary

Quarter	1	2	3	4	Total
Blue Raiders	0	7	0	0	7
Aggies	0	10	3	0	13

at Aggie Memorial Stadium, Las Cruces, New Mexico

- Date: November 4
- Game time: 4:00 p.m. MDT
- Game weather: Sunny, 79 °F (26 °C)
- Game attendance: 15,727
- TV announcers (ESPN+): Adam Young, Danny Knee, and Tatiana Favela
- Box score, Recap

Game information
First quarter
- No scoring plays

Second quarter

- NMSU – Ron Tiavaasue 1-yard run (Ethan Albertson kick), 10:17. Aggies 7–0. Drive: 9 plays, 80 yards, 6:43.
- MTSU – D. J. England-Chisolm 27-yard pass from Nicholas Vattiato (Zeke Rankin kick), 0:48. Tied 7–7. Drive: 6 plays, 79 yards, 0:54.
- NMSU – Ethan Albertson 26-yard field goal, 0:00. Aggies 10–7. Drive: 7 plays, 67 yards, 0:48.

Third quarter

- NMSU – Ethan Albertson 38-yard field goal, 0:51. Aggies 13–7. Drive: 11 plays, 66 yards, 6:18.

Fourth quarter

- No scoring plays

Statistics	MTSU	NMSU
First downs	17	21
Total yards	346	402
Rushing yards	168	182
Passing yards	178	220
Turnovers	1	1
Time of possession	24:13	35:47

Team	Category	Player	Statistics
Middle Tennessee	Passing	Nicholas Vattiato	20/36, 178 yards, TD, INT
Middle Tennessee	Rushing	Nicholas Vattiato	18 rushes, 96 yards
Middle Tennessee	Receiving	Elijah Metcalf	5 receptions, 69 yards
New Mexico State	Passing	Diego Pavia	16/31, 220 yards, INT
New Mexico State	Rushing	Monte Watkins	5 rushes, 68 yards
New Mexico State	Receiving	Eli Stowers	6 receptions, 83 yards

=== At Western Kentucky ===
New Mexico State Aggies at Western Kentucky Hilltoppers – Game summary

Quarter	1	2	3	4	Total
Aggies	3	14	7	14	38
Hilltoppers	14	7	0	8	29

at Houchens Industries–L. T. Smith Stadium, Bowling Green, Kentucky

- Date: November 11
- Game time: 1:30 p.m. MST/2:30 p.m. CST
- Game weather: Sunny, 62 °F (17 °C)
- Game attendance: 16,319
- Referee: Rodney Burnette
- TV announcers (ESPN+): Joe Fisher and Terry Obee
- Box score, Recap

Game information
First quarter
- WKU – Elijah Young 72-yard pass from Austin Reed (Lucas Carneiro kick), 13:51. Hilltoppers 7–0. Drive: 3 plays, 75 yards, 1:09.
- WKU – Austin Reed 13-yard run (Lucas Carneiro kick), 7:27. Hilltoppers 14–0. Drive: 10 plays, 73 yards, 5:11.
- NMSU – Ethan Albertson 40-yard field goal, 3:49. Hilltoppers 14–3. Drive: 6 plays, 52 yards, 3:38.

Second quarter

- NMSU – Jonathan Brady 10-yard run (Ethan Albertson kick), 14:55. Hilltoppers 14–10. Drive: 7 plays, 45 yards, 3:00.
- NMSU – Trent Hudson 4-yard pass from Diego Pavia (Ethan Albertson kick), 6:19. Aggies 17–14. Drive: 11 plays, 72 yards, 5:29.
- WKU – Craig Burt Jr. 4-yard pass from Austin Reed (Lucas Carneiro kick), 0:06. Hilltoppers 21–17. Drive: 17 plays, 75 yards, 6:09.

Third quarter

- NMSU – Eli Stowers 7-yard pass from Diego Pavia (Ethan Albertson kick), 3:41. Aggies 24–21. Drive: 10 plays, 80 yards, 5:58.

Fourth quarter

- NMSU – Eli Stowers 7-yard run (Ethan Albertson kick), 4:14. Aggies 31–21. Drive: 11 plays, 65 yards, 7:14.
- NMSU – Mehki Miller 57-yard interception return (Ethan Albertson kick), 2:57. Aggies 38–21.
- WKU – Malachi Corley 15-yard pass from Austin Reed (Austin Reed pass to Malachi Corley), 1:30. Aggies 38–29. Drive: 7 plays, 71 yards, 1:21.

Statistics	NMSU	WKU
First downs	21	26
Total yards	377	437
Rushing yards	236	167
Passing yards	141	270
Turnovers	0	1
Time of possession	32:55	27:05

Team	Category	Player	Statistics
New Mexico State	Passing	Diego Pavia	14/24, 141 yards, 2 TD
New Mexico State	Rushing	Star Thomas	7 rushes, 85 yards
New Mexico State	Receiving	Jonathan Brady	3 receptions, 31 yards
Western Kentucky	Passing	Austin Reed	20/36, 270 yards, 3 TD, INT
Western Kentucky	Rushing	Elijah Young	14 rushes, 80 yards
Western Kentucky	Receiving	Elijah Young	3 receptions, 84 yards, TD

=== At Auburn ===
New Mexico State Aggies at Auburn Tigers – Game summary

Quarter	1	2	3	4	Total
Aggies	7	3	7	14	31
Tigers	0	7	0	3	10

at Jordan–Hare Stadium, Auburn, Alabama

- Date: November 18
- Game time: 2:00 p.m. MST/3:00 p.m. CST
- Game weather: Sunny, 71 °F (22 °C)
- Game attendance: 88,043
- Referee: Ken Williamson
- TV announcers (SECN): Dave Neal, Derek Mason, and Taylor Davis
- Box score, Recap

Game information
First quarter
- NMSU – Kordell David 9-yard pass from Diego Pavia (Ethan Albertson kick), 9:34. Aggies 7–0. Drive: 11 plays, 75 yards, 5:26.

Second quarter

- AUB – Rivaldo Fairweather 32-yard pass from Payton Thorne (Alex McPherson kick), 6:28. Tied 7–7. Drive: 11 plays, 81 yards, 5:00.
- NMSU – Ethan Albertson 40-yard field goal, 0:26. Aggies 10–7. Drive: 11 plays, 53 yards, 6:02.

Third quarter

- NMSU – Star Thomas 17-yard pass from Diego Pavia (Ethan Albertson kick), 5:03. Aggies 17–7. Drive: 10 plays, 80 yards, 5:24.

Fourth quarter

- NMSU – Eli Stowers 2-yard pass from Diego Pavia (Ethan Albertson kick), 8:42. Aggies 24–7. Drive: 16 plays, 83 yards, 9:58.
- AUB – Alex McPherson 48-yard field goal, 5:29. Aggies 24–10. Drive: 8 plays, 53 yards, 3:10.
- NMSU – Makhilyn Young 2-yard run (Ethan Albertson kick), 1:59. Aggies 31–10. Drive: 6 plays, 43 yards, 3:28.

Statistics	NMSU	AUB
First downs	23	12
Total yards	414	213
Rushing yards	213	65
Passing yards	201	148
Turnovers	0	0
Time of possession	38:50	21:10

Team	Category	Player	Statistics
New Mexico State	Passing	Diego Pavia	19/28, 201 yards, 3 TD
New Mexico State	Rushing	Star Thomas	7 rushes, 67 yards
New Mexico State	Receiving	Kordell David	4 receptions, 55 yards, TD
Auburn	Passing	Payton Thorne	15/19, 148 yards, TD
Auburn	Rushing	Payton Thorne	17 rushes, 38 yards
Auburn	Receiving	Ja'Varrius Johnson	2 receptions, 46 yards

=== Jacksonville State ===
Jacksonville State Gamecocks at New Mexico State Aggies – Game summary

Quarter	1	2	3	4	Total
Gamecocks	0	3	0	14	17
Aggies	14	3	0	3	20

at Aggie Memorial Stadium, Las Cruces, New Mexico

- Date: November 25
- Game time: 2:00 p.m. MST
- Game weather: Cloudy, 61 °F (16 °C)
- Game attendance: 15,702
- Referee: Garrett Dickerson
- TV announcers (ESPN+): Adam Young, Danny Knee, and Tatiana Favela
- Box score, Recap

Game information
First quarter
- NMSU – Jamoni Jones 1-yard run (Ethan Albertson kick), 8:12. Aggies 7–0. Drive: 13 plays, 65 yards, 6:48.
- NMSU – Trent Hudson 11-yard pass from Diego Pavia (Ethan Albertson kick), 2:28. Aggies 14–0. Drive: 8 plays, 83 yards, 4:15.

Second quarter

- JVST – Alen Karajic 33-yard field goal, 7:09. Aggies 14–3. Drive: 5 plays, 41 yards, 1:21.
- NMSU – Ethan Albertson 27-yard field goal, 0:00. Aggies 17–3. Drive: 15 plays, 70 yards, 3:31.

Third quarter

- No scoring plays

Fourth quarter

- JVST – Alen Karajic 27-yard field goal, 14:52. Aggies 17–6. Drive: 4 plays, -1 yard, 1:07.
- JVST – Malik Jackson 11-yard run (Zion Webb run), 6:23. Aggies 17–14. Drive: 4 plays, 22 yards, 0:56.
- JVST – Alen Karajic 27-yard field goal, 0:43. Tied 17–17. Drive: 12 plays, 52 yards, 2:57.
- NMSU – Ethan Albertson 52-yard field goal, 0:00. Aggies 20–17. Drive: 5 plays, 50 yards, 0:43.

Statistics	JVSU	NMSU
First downs	17	27
Total yards	333	455
Rushing yards	85	186
Passing yards	248	269
Turnovers	2	4
Time of possession	20:18	39:42

Team	Category	Player	Statistics
Jacksonville State	Passing	Zion Webb	17/30, 248 yards, 2 INT
Jacksonville State	Rushing	Malik Jackson	8 rushes, 43 yards, TD
Jacksonville State	Receiving	Perry Carter	7 receptions, 134 yards
New Mexico State	Passing	Diego Pavia	23/34, 269 yards, TD, 2 INT
New Mexico State	Rushing	Diego Pavia	19 rushes, 68 yards
New Mexico State	Receiving	Trent Hudson	5 receptions, 70 yards, TD

=== At No. 24 Liberty (C-USA Championship Game) ===
New Mexico State Aggies at No. 24 Liberty Flames (C-USA Championship Game) – Game summary

Quarter	1	2	3	4	Total
Aggies	7	14	14	0	35
No. 24 Flames	7	14	14	14	49

at Williams Stadium, Lynchburg, Virginia

- Date: December 1
- Game time: 5:00 p.m. MST/7:00 p.m. EST
- Game weather: Rain, 44 °F (7 °C)
- Game attendance: 20,077
- Referee: Ron Hudson
- TV announcers (CBSSN): Rich Waltz, Aaron Taylor, and Amanda Guerra
- Box score, Recap

Game information
First quarter
- NMSU – Diego Pavia 25-yard run (Ethan Albertson kick), 10:08. Aggies 7–0. Drive: 8 plays, 75 yards, 4:52.
- LIB – Quinton Cooley 1-yard run (Nick Brown kick), 6:09. Tied 7–7. Drive: 9 plays, 80 yards, 3:52.

Second quarter

- NMSU – Ron Tiavaasue 10-yard pass from Diego Pavia (Ethan Albertson kick), 14:55. Aggies 14–7. Drive: 11 plays, 75 yards, 6:14.
- LIB – Quinton Cooley 12-yard run (Nick Brown kick), 5:38. Tied 14–14. Drive: 5 plays, 55 yards, 2:17.
- LIB – Noah Frith 26-yard pass from Kaidon Salter (Nick Brown kick), 0:27. Flames 21–14. Drive: 8 plays, 89 yards, 1:24.
- NMSU – Trent Hudson 17-yard pass from Diego Pavia (Ethan Albertson kick), 0:03. Tied 21–21. Drive: 4 plays, 58 yards, 0:22.

Third quarter

- LIB – Quinton Cooley 4-yard run (Nick Brown kick), 13:15. Flames 28–21. Drive: 5 plays, 71 yards, 1:40.
- LIB – C. J. Daniels 20-yard pass from Kaidon Salter (Nick Brown kick), 9:19. Flames 35–21. Drive: 5 plays, 64 yards, 2:30.
- NMSU – Jonathan Brady 75-yard pass from Diego Pavia (Ethan Albertson kick), 9:07. Flames 35–28. Drive: 1 play, 75 yards, 0:12.
- NMSU – Trent Hudson 11-yard pass from Blaze Berlowitz (Ethan Albertson kick), 2:57. Tied 35–35. Drive: 6 plays, 80 yards, 2:24.

Fourth quarter

- LIB – Billy Lucas 2-yard run (Nick Brown kick), 13:51. Flames 42–35. Drive: 9 plays, 80 yards, 4:00.
- LIB – Kaidon Salter 35-yard run (Nick Brown kick), 8:23. Flames 49–35. Drive: 4 plays, 80 yards, 1:19.

Statistics	NMSU	LIB
First downs	28	35
Total yards	499	712
Rushing yards	177	393
Passing yards	322	319
Turnovers	1	0
Time of possession	30:13	29:47

Team	Category	Player	Statistics
New Mexico State	Passing	Diego Pavia	11/16, 188 yards, 3 TD
New Mexico State	Rushing	Diego Pavia	5 rushes, 45 yards, TD
New Mexico State	Receiving	Trent Hudson	7 receptions, 112 yards, 2 TD
Liberty	Passing	Kaidon Salter	20/25, 319 yards, 2 TD
Liberty	Rushing	Kaidon Salter	12 rushes, 165 yards, TD
Liberty	Receiving	C. J. Daniels	7 receptions, 157 yards, TD

Starting quarterback Diego Pavia left the game in the third quarter with an apparent elbow injury and did not return. Freshman quarterback Blaze Berlowitz played the remainder of the game.

=== Vs. Fresno State (New Mexico Bowl) ===
New Mexico State Aggies vs. Fresno State Bulldogs (New Mexico Bowl) – Game summary

Quarter	1	2	3	4	Total
Aggies	0	3	7	0	10
Bulldogs	10	7	3	17	37

at University Stadium, Albuquerque, New Mexico

- Date: December 16
- Game time: 3:45 p.m. MST
- Game weather: Clear, 51 °F (11 °C)
- Game attendance: 30,822
- Referee: Marshall Lewis
- TV announcers (ESPN): Clay Matvick, Rod Gilmore, and Lauren Sisler
- Box score, Recap

Game information
First quarter
- FRES – Dylan Lynch 32-yard field goal, 6:17. Bulldogs 3–0. Drive: 7 plays, 61 yards, 3:37.
- FRES – Josiah Freeman 26-yard pass from Mikey Keene (Dylan Lynch kick), 3:26. Bulldogs 10–0. Drive: 3 plays, 40 yards, 1:35.

Second quarter

- NMSU – Ethan Albertson 45-yard field goal, 10:47. Bulldogs 10–3. Drive: 4 plays, 5 yards, 1:26.
- FRES – Jaelen Gill 23-yard pass from Mikey Keene (Dylan Lynch kick), 7:02. Bulldogs 17–3. Drive: 7 plays, 82 yards, 3:45.

Third quarter

- FRES – Dylan Lynch 25-yard field goal, 11:50. Bulldogs 20–3. Drive: 9 plays, 68 yards, 3:10.
- NMSU – Diego Pavia 14-yard run (Ethan Albertson kick), 4:23. Bulldogs 20–10. Drive: 14 plays, 75 yards, 7:27.

Fourth quarter

- FRES – Mikey Keene 4-yard run (Dylan Lynch kick), 13:20. Bulldogs 27–10. Drive: 13 plays, 66 yards, 6:03.
- FRES – Dylan Lynch 38-yard field goal, 7:08. Bulldogs 30–10. Drive: 9 plays, 44 yards, 4:25.
- FRES – Jalen Moss 9-yard pass from Mikey Keene (Dylan Lynch kick), 4:40. Bulldogs 37–10. Drive: 4 plays, 32 yards, 1:52.

Statistics	NMSU	FRES
First downs	12	23
Total yards	200	500
Rushing yards	142	120
Passing yards	58	380
Turnovers	1	2
Time of possession	29:10	30:50

Team	Category	Player	Statistics
New Mexico State	Passing	Diego Pavia	11/25, 58 yards, INT
New Mexico State	Rushing	Diego Pavia	18 rushes, 72 yards, TD
New Mexico State	Receiving	Eli Stowers	3 receptions, 20 yards
Fresno State	Passing	Mikey Keene	31/39, 380 yards, 3 TD, INT
Fresno State	Rushing	Malik Sherrod	20 rushes, 90 yards
Fresno State	Receiving	Malik Sherrod	8 receptions, 81 yards
