= 2023 Western Kentucky Hilltoppers football team =

American college football season

2023 Western Kentucky Hilltoppers football

Famous Toastery Bowl champion

Famous Toastery Bowl, W 38–35 ^{OT} vs. Old Dominion
- Conference: Conference USA
- Record: 8–5 (5–3 C-USA)
- Head coach: Tyson Helton (5th season)
- Offensive coordinator: Drew Hollingshead (1st season)
- Offensive scheme: Air raid
- Defensive coordinator: Tyson Summers (2nd season)
- Base defense: 3–3–5
- Home stadium: Houchens Industries–L. T. Smith Stadium

2023 Conference USA football standings
	Conf.			Overall
Team	W		L	W		L
No. 25 Liberty y$	8	–	0	13	–	1
New Mexico State y	7	–	1	10	–	5
Jacksonville State*	6	–	2	9	–	4
Western Kentucky	5	–	3	8	–	5
Middle Tennessee	3	–	5	4	–	8
UTEP	2	–	6	3	–	9
Sam Houston*	2	–	6	3	–	9
Louisiana Tech	2	–	6	3	–	9
FIU	1	–	7	4	–	8
Championship: Liberty 49, New Mexico State 35
$ – Conference champion; y – Championship game participant; * – Ineligible for postseason play due to FCS-to-FBS transition rules; Rankings from AP Poll

The 2023 Western Kentucky Hilltoppers football team represented Western Kentucky University in the 2023 NCAA Division I FBS football season. The Hilltoppers played their home games at Houchens Industries–L. T. Smith Stadium in Bowling Green, Kentucky, and competed members of Conference USA. They were led by fifth-year head coach Tyson Helton. The Western Kentucky Hilltoppers football team drew an average home attendance of 15,710 in 2023.

== Schedule ==
Western Kentucky and Conference USA announced the 2023 football schedule on January 10, 2023.

Date	Time	Opponent	Site	TV	Result	Attendance
September 2	11:00 a.m.	South Florida*	Houchens Industries–L. T. Smith Stadium; Bowling Green, KY	CBSSN	W 41–24	15,438
September 9	6:00 p.m.	Houston Christian*	Houchens Industries–L. T. Smith Stadium; Bowling Green, KY	ESPN+	W 52–22	20,712
September 16	3:00 p.m.	at No. 6 Ohio State*	Ohio Stadium; Columbus, OH	FOX	L 10–63	100,217
September 23	11:00 a.m.	at Troy*	Veterans Memorial Stadium; Troy, AL	ESPNU	L 24–27	26,124
September 28	6:30 p.m.	Middle Tennessee	Houchens Industries–L. T. Smith Stadium; Bowling Green, KY (100 Miles of Hate)	CBSSN	W 31–10	14,712
October 5	7:00 p.m.	at Louisiana Tech	Joe Aillet Stadium; Ruston, LA	ESPN	W 35–28	13,014
October 17	6:30 p.m.	at Jacksonville State	Burgess–Snow Field at JSU Stadium; Jacksonville, AL	ESPNU	L 17–20	17,977
October 24	6:30 p.m.	Liberty	Houchens Industries–L. T. Smith Stadium; Bowling Green, KY	ESPNU	L 29–42	16,036
November 4	8:00 p.m.	at UTEP	Sun Bowl; El Paso, TX	ESPN+	W 21–13	11,111
November 11	2:30 p.m.	New Mexico State^{†}	Houchens Industries–L. T. Smith Stadium; Bowling Green, KY	ESPN+	L 29–38	16,319
November 18	2:30 p.m.	Sam Houston	Houchens Industries–L. T. Smith Stadium; Bowling Green, KY	ESPN+	W 28–23	11,041
November 25	2:00 p.m.	at FIU	Riccardo Silva Stadium; Westchester, FL	ESPN+	W 41–28	12,724
December 18	1:30 p.m.	vs. Old Dominion*	Jerry Richardson Stadium; Charlotte, NC (Famous Toastery Bowl)	ESPN	W 38–35 ^{OT}	5,632
*Non-conference game; ^{†}Homecoming; Rankings from AP Poll (and CFP Rankings, after November 1) - Released prior to game; All times are in Central time

== Game summaries ==
=== at No. 6 Ohio State ===
Western Kentucky Hilltoppers (2–0) at No. 6 Ohio State Buckeyes (2–0) – Game summary

Quarter	1	2	3	4	Total
Hilltoppers	3	7	0	0	10
No. 6 Buckeyes	7	35	7	14	63

at Ohio Stadium • Columbus, Ohio

- Date: September 16
- Game time: 4:00 p.m. EDT
- Game weather: Cloudy • Temperature: 76 °F (24 °C) • Wind: N at 3 miles per hour (4.8 km/h)
- Game attendance: 100,217
- Referee: Jeffrey Servinski
- TV announcers (FOX): Jason Benetti (play-by-play), Brock Huard (analyst), and Allison Williams (sideline reporter)
- Box score, Recap

Game information

First quarter

- (11:32) OSU – TreVeyon Henderson 21-yard run, Jayden Fielding kick (Drive: 8 plays, 75 yards, 3:20; Ohio State 7–0)
- (1:07) WKU – Lucas Carneiro 43-yard field goal (Drive: 11 plays, 31 yards, 4:32; Ohio State 7–3)

Second quarter

- (10:53) OSU – TreVeyon Henderson 7-yard run, Jayden Fielding kick (Drive: 12 plays, 82 yards, 5:07; Ohio State 14–3)
- (8:10) WKU – Malachi Corley 2-yard pass from Austin Reed, Lucas Carneiro kick (Drive: 7 plays, 75 yards, 2:43; Ohio State 14–10)
- (8:00) OSU – Marvin Harrison Jr. 75-yard pass from Kyle McCord, Jayden Fielding kick (Drive: 1 play, 75 yards, 0:10; Ohio State 21–10)
- (4:13) OSU – Chip Trayanum 40-yard run, Jayden Fielding kick (Drive: 1 play, 40 yards, 0:07; Ohio State 28–10)
- (1:55) OSU – Emeka Egbuka 15-yard pass from Kyle McCord, Jayden Fielding kick (Drive: 4 plays, 48 yards, 1:25; Ohio State 35–10)
- (0:08) OSU – Emeka Egbuka 14-yard pass from Kyle McCord, Jayden Fielding kick (Drive: 3 plays, 58 yards, 0:20; Ohio State 42–10)

Third quarter

- (4:38) OSU – Tyleik Williams 0-yard fumble return, Jayden Fielding kick (Ohio State 49–10)

Fourth quarter

- (12:37) OSU – Carnell Tate 28-yard pass from Devin Brown, Jayden Fielding kick (Drive: 7 plays, 55 yards, 3:23; Ohio State 56–10)
- (5:26) OSU – Jermaine Mathews Jr. 58-yard interception return, Jayden Fielding kick (Ohio State 63–10)

Statistics	WKU	OSU
First downs	15	24
Plays–yards	72–284	60–562
Rushes–yards	33–80	33–204
Passing yards	204	358
Passing: comp–att–int	22–39–2	22–27–1
Time of possession	32:34	27:26

Team	Category	Player	Statistics
Western Kentucky	Passing	Austin Reed	21/37, 207 yards, 1 TD, 1 INT
Western Kentucky	Rushing	L. T. Sanders	7 carries, 26 yards
Western Kentucky	Receiving	Malachi Corley	8 receptions, 88 yards, 1 TD
Ohio State	Passing	Kyle McCord	19/23, 318 yards, 3 TD
Ohio State	Rushing	TreVeyon Henderson	13 carries, 88 yards, 2 TD
Ohio State	Receiving	Marvin Harrison Jr.	5 receptions, 126 yards, 1 TD

=== at Jacksonville State ===
Western Kentucky Hilltoppers (4–2) at Jacksonville State Gamecocks (5–2) – Game summary

Quarter	1	2	3	4	Total
Hilltoppers	10	7	0	0	17
Gamecocks	0	10	0	10	20

at Burgess–Snow Field at JSU Stadium • Jacksonville, Alabama

- Date: October 17
- Game time: 6:30 p.m. CDT
- Game weather: Clear, 62 °F (17 °C)
- Game attendance: 17,977
- Referee: Ed Ardito
- TV announcers (ESPNU): Dave Neal (play-by-play) and Derek Mason (analyst)

Game information

First quarter

- (8:52) WKU – Dalvin Smith 10-yard pass from Austin Reed, Lucas Carneiro kick (Drive: 8 plays, 53 yards, 2:20; Western Kentucky 7–0)
- (1:55) WKU – Lucas Carneiro 28-yard field goal (Drive: 13 plays, 79 yards, 5:01; Western Kentucky 10–10)

Second quarter

- (12:45) JVST – Zion Webb 10-yard run, Alen Karajic kick (Drive: 11 plays, 75 yards, 4:14; Western Kentucky 10–7)
- (8:36) WKU – River Helms 3-yard pass from Austin Reed, Lucas Carneiro kick (Drive: 5 plays, 40 yards, 2:09; Western Kentucky 17–7)
- (5:35) JVST – Alen Karajic 23-yard field goal (Drive: 10 plays, 70 yards, 3:01; Western Kentucky 17–10)

Third quarter

- No scoring plays

Fourth quarter

- (4:40) JVST – Anwar Lewis 26-yard run, Alen Karajic kick (Drive: 11 plays, 91 yards, 3:39; Tied 17–17)
- (0:00) JVST – Alen Karajic 41-yard field goal (Drive: 10 plays, 45 yards, 2:32; Jacksonville State 20–17)

Statistics	WKU	JVST
First downs	16	27
Plays–yards	72–339	95–484
Rushes–yards	24–89	55–262
Passing yards	250	222
Passing: comp–att–int	24–48–1	23–40–1
Time of possession	26:56	33:04

Team	Category	Player	Statistics
Western Kentucky	Passing	Austin Reed	24/48, 250 yards, 2 TD, 1 INT
Western Kentucky	Rushing	Elijah Young	10 carries, 39 yards
Western Kentucky	Receiving	K. D. Hutchinson	4 receptions, 52 yards
Jacksonville State	Passing	Zion Webb	22/39, 218 yards, 1 INT
Jacksonville State	Rushing	Zion Webb	28 carries, 146 yards, 1 TD
Jacksonville State	Receiving	P. J. Wells	5 receptions, 53 yards

=== New Mexico State ===
New Mexico State Aggies at Western Kentucky Hilltoppers – Game summary

Quarter	1	2	3	4	Total
Aggies	3	14	7	14	38
Hilltoppers	14	7	0	8	29

at Houchens Industries–L. T. Smith Stadium, Bowling Green, Kentucky

- Date: November 11
- Game time: 1:30 p.m. MST/2:30 p.m. CST
- Game weather: Sunny, 62 °F (17 °C)
- Game attendance: 16,319
- Referee: Rodney Burnette
- TV announcers (ESPN+): Joe Fisher and Terry Obee

Game information
First quarter
- WKU – Elijah Young 72-yard pass from Austin Reed (Lucas Carneiro kick), 13:51. Hilltoppers 7–0. Drive: 3 plays, 75 yards, 1:09.
- WKU – Austin Reed 13-yard run (Lucas Carneiro kick), 7:27. Hilltoppers 14–0. Drive: 10 plays, 73 yards, 5:11.
- NMSU – Ethan Albertson 40-yard field goal, 3:49. Hilltoppers 14–3. Drive: 6 plays, 52 yards, 3:38.

Second quarter

- NMSU – Jonathan Brady 10-yard run (Ethan Albertson kick), 14:55. Hilltoppers 14–10. Drive: 7 plays, 45 yards, 3:00.
- NMSU – Trent Hudson 4-yard pass from Diego Pavia (Ethan Albertson kick), 6:19. Aggies 17–14. Drive: 11 plays, 72 yards, 5:29.
- WKU – Craig Burt Jr. 4-yard pass from Austin Reed (Lucas Carneiro kick), 0:06. Hilltoppers 21–17. Drive: 17 plays, 75 yards, 6:09.

Third quarter

- NMSU – Eli Stowers 7-yard pass from Diego Pavia (Ethan Albertson kick), 3:41. Aggies 24–21. Drive: 10 plays, 80 yards, 5:58.

Fourth quarter

- NMSU – Eli Stowers 7-yard run (Ethan Albertson kick), 4:14. Aggies 31–21. Drive: 11 plays, 65 yards, 7:14.
- NMSU – Mehki Miller 57-yard interception return (Ethan Albertson kick), 2:57. Aggies 38–21.
- WKU – Malachi Corley 15-yard pass from Austin Reed (Austin Reed pass to Malachi Corley), 1:30. Aggies 38–29. Drive: 7 plays, 71 yards, 1:21.

Statistics	NMSU	WKU
First downs	21	26
Total yards	377	437
Rushing yards	236	167
Passing yards	141	270
Turnovers	0	1
Time of possession	32:55	27:05

Team	Category	Player	Statistics
New Mexico State	Passing	Diego Pavia	14/24, 141 yards, 2 TD
New Mexico State	Rushing	Star Thomas	7 carries, 85 yards
New Mexico State	Receiving	Jonathan Brady	3 receptions, 31 yards
Western Kentucky	Passing	Austin Reed	20/36, 270 yards, 3 TD, INT
Western Kentucky	Rushing	Elijah Young	14 carries, 80 yards
Western Kentucky	Receiving	Elijah Young	3 receptions, 84 yards, TD

== Roster ==
2023 Western Kentucky Hilltoppers football team roster
Players
Coaches
Offense

Pos.	#	Name	Class
RB	2	Davion Ervin-Poindexter	Sr
RB	3	Elijah Young	Jr
WR	4	Michael Mathison	Sr
WR	5	Blue Smith	Sr
WR	6	Jimmy Holiday	So
RB	7	L. T. Sanders	So
WR	8	Easton Messer	Fr
WR	9	Josh Sterns	So
QB	10	Caden Veltkamp	Fr
WR	11	Malachi Corley	Jr
QB	12	Turner Helton	Fr
QB	13	Bronson Barron	Jr
WR	14	Willie Taggart Jr.	So
WR	15	K.D. Hutchinson	Fr
QB	16	Austin Reed	GS
WR	17	Dalvin Smith	Jr
WR	18	Moussa Barry	Fr
RB	19	Javy Bunton	So
WR	19	Craig Burt Jr.	Sr
WR	20	Jaleel Walker	Jr
WR	21	Marvin Sims	So
WR	23	Jax Cooper	Fr
WR	26	Jarvis Hayes	Fr
RB	27	Corey Landers	Fr
RB	30	Markese Stepp	Sr
WR	37	Zach Burt	Fr
OL	50	Wesley Horton	So
OL	53	Marshall Jackson	So
OL	56	Leavy Johnson	Fr
OL	57	Wyatt Anderson	Fr
OL	58	Evan Wibberley	Fr
OL	60	Mason Williams	Jr
OL	62	Michael Moment	Jr
OL	64	Vincent Murphy	Jr
OL	67	Hayden Todd	Fr
OL	68	Colt Jackson	So
OL	70	Darrell Johnson Jr.	Jr
OL	72	Colten Cable	Jr
OL	73	Wes Dorsey	Jr
OL	74	Michael Ondelacy	Jr
OL	76	Mark Goode	Jr
OL	77	Tyrese Black	Sr
OL	78	Quantavious Lesue	Jr
WR	80	Ze'Vian Capers	So
TE	81	Noah Meyers	Fr
WR	82	Denzil Alleyne	Jr
TE	83	Alex Williams	So
TE	84	Elvin Fofanah	Jr
WR	85	Tylon Webb	Fr
TE	86	Trevor Borland	Jr
TE	87	River Helms	So
TE	88	Aiden Miller	Fr
TE	89	Lofton Howard	Fr

Defense

Pos.	#	Name	Class
LB	3	JaQues Evans	Jr
DB	4	Anthony Johnson Jr.	Jr
DB	5	Rome Weber	Sr
DB	6	T.J. Springer	Jr
DB	7	Takulve Williams	Sr
LB	10	Desmyn Baker	Jr
DB	11	Talique Allen	So
LB	12	R.J. Evans	Jr
DT	13	Terrion Thompson	Jr
DB	14	Davion Williams	Sr
LB	15	Aaron Key	So
DB	16	Kendrick Simpkins	Jr
DB	17	Josh Shodipo	Sr
DB	19	Virgil Marshall	So
LB	20	Bryson Washington	Sr
DB	21	Upton Stout	So
DB	22	Darius Thomas	So
LB	23	Rashion Hodge	Jr
DB	24	Daniel Edwards Jr.	So
LB	25	Rickie Davis Jr.	So
DB	26	Amaari Smith	Fr
DB	27	Nazir Ward	Fr
DB	28	Ely George	So
DB	29	Joshua Mensah	So
DB	30	Xavier Shaw	So
LB	31	Anthony Brackenridge	So
LB	32	Kylan Guidry	Jr
LB	33	Eli Jones	Fr
LB	34	Koron Hayward	Fr
DL	35	Dallas Walker	So
DB	36	Chavaris Dumas	Fr
LB	38	Reginald Allen Jr.	Fr
DE	40	Reid Jamerson	Fr
DB	41	Alex Ford	Fr
LB	42	Trent Zappe	Fr
DB	43	Manny Moss	Fr
DT	44	Dareon Goodrum	Sr
LB	45	Nathan Griffin	So
LB	48	Niko Cooper	Sr
LB	50	Lonnie Rice	So
LB	51	Devon Lynch	Jr
LB	59	Sebastian Benjamin	Jr
DL	88	Ryan Williams	So
DT	90	Keaton Law	Fr
DE	92	Marcus Patterson	Fr
DL	93	Jalen Hand	Fr
DL	94	Jayden Loving	So
DE	95	Deante McCray	Fr
DL	96	Marquis Black	So
DL	97	Ki'Shawn Harvey	Fr
DT	98	Hosea Wheeler	So
DL	99	Kenyonte Davis	Sr

Special teams

Pos.	#	Name	Class
K	17	Lucas Carneiro	Fr
K	39	Antonio Chadha	Fr
K	46	Cory Munson	Sr
P	47	Tom Ellard	So
K	49	Nolan McCord	So
LS	52	Trey Naughton	Fr
P	54	Jared White	Fr
LS	55	Rex Robich	So

Head coach

- Tyson Helton

Coordinators/assistant coaches

- Drew Hollingshead (Co-Offensive coordinator / quarterbacks)
- Zach Lankford (co-offensive coordinator / Offensive line)
- Tyson Summers (Defensive coordinator)
- Andy Larussa (special teams coordinator / tight ends)
- Micheal Spurlock (wide receivers)
- Carson Hall (defensive line)
- Andre Crenshaw (running backs)
- Da'Von Brown (defensive backs)
- Davis Merritt (inside linebackers)
- Jamar Chaney (outside linebackers)

Legend

- (C) Team captain
- (S) Suspended
- (I) Ineligible
- Injured
- Redshirt

Roster
