= 2023 New Orleans Bowl =

Postseason college football bowl game

2023 R+L Carriers New Orleans Bowl
- 23rd New Orleans Bowl
Jacksonville State Gamecocks	Louisiana Ragin' Cajuns
(8–4)	(6–6)
C-USA	Sun Belt
34	31
Head coach: Rich Rodriguez	Head coach: Michael Desormeaux
	1	2	3	4	OT	Total
Jacksonville State	7	7	10	7	3	34
Louisiana	7	7	7	10	0	31
- Date: December 16, 2023
- Season: 2023
- Stadium: Caesars Superdome
- Location: New Orleans, Louisiana
- MVP: Ron Wiggins (RB, Jacksonville State)
- Favorite: Louisiana by 3.5
- Referee: Steven Anderson (AAC)
- Attendance: 14,485

United States TV coverage
- Network: ESPN; ESPN Radio
- Announcers: Anish Shroff (play-by-play), Andre Ware (analyst), and Taylor Davis (sideline) (ESPN); Marc Kestecher (play-by-play) and Kelly Stouffer (analyst) (ESPN Radio)

The 2023 New Orleans Bowl was a college football bowl game played on December 16, 2023, at Caesars Superdome located in New Orleans, Louisiana. The 23rd annual New Orleans Bowl game featured the Louisiana Ragin' Cajuns of the Sun Belt Conference and the Jacksonville State Gamecocks of Conference USA. The game began at approximately 2:15 p.m. CST and was aired on ESPN. The New Orleans Bowl was one of the 2023–24 bowl games concluding the 2023 FBS football season. The game was sponsored by freight shipping company R+L Carriers and officially known as the R+L Carriers New Orleans Bowl. Jacksonville State defeated Louisiana in overtime, 34–31, on a game-winning field goal, to claim their first bowl win in program history.

== Teams ==
The game featured the Louisiana Ragin' Cajuns from the Sun Belt Conference and the Jacksonville State Gamecocks from Conference USA. This was the first time that Louisiana and Jacksonville State have played at the FBS level, with the Gamecocks having defeated the Ragin' Cajuns as an FCS school in 2000, 28–14.

=== Louisiana ===
The Ragin' Cajuns started the year 4-2, scoring at least 24 points in each of their first six games, including a 35–24 loss to Big Ten foe Minnesota. After defeating South Alabama 33–20 to improve to 5-3, starting quarterback Zeon Chriss suffered a broken fibula in the middle of their ninth game, which was followed by a three-game losing streak as the team fell to 5-6. Needing a win in the Battle on the Bayou to clinch bowl eligibility, backup quarterback Chandler Fields led the Ragin' Cajuns to a rout of rival Louisiana–Monroe, 52–21, securing Louisiana a spot in the New Orleans Bowl.

This was Louisiana's seventh New Orleans Bowl, extending their record for most appearances in the game. The Ragin' Cajuns' overall New Orleans Bowl record entering the 2023 game was 3–1 (excluding two wins vacated by the NCAA).

=== Jacksonville State ===
Due to NCAA transition rules for teams moving from FCS to FBS, Jacksonville State would be ineligible to play in a bowl unless not enough six-win teams were available to fill all of the season's bowl games. The Gamecocks won five of their first six games competing as an FBS school, with the sole loss coming in Week 3 to Coastal Carolina. They reached the six-win threshold on October 17 by defeating Western Kentucky, 20–17, on a walk-off field goal. The Gamecocks finished their season with an 8–4 record and secured bowl eligibility when not enough teams reached six wins to fill all available bowl games.

== Game summary ==
2023 R+L Carriers New Orleans Bowl

Quarter	1	2	3	4	OT	Total
Jacksonville State	7	7	10	7	3	34
Louisiana	7	7	7	10	0	31

at Caesars Superdome • New Orleans, Louisiana

- Date: Saturday, December 16, 2023
- Game time: 1:15 p.m. CST
- Game weather: None (indoor stadium)
- Game attendance: 14,485
- Referee: Steven Anderson
- TV announcers (ESPN): Anish Shroff (play-by-play), Andre Ware (analyst), and Taylor Davis (sideline)
- Box score

Game information

First Quarter

- (13:17) LA – Jalen Clark 46 yard fumble return, Kenneth Almendares kick (Louisiana 7–0)
- (3:06) JVST – Cole Fuller 1 yard run, Garrison Rippa kick (Drive: 13 plays, 80 yards, 4:42; Tied 7–7)

Second Quarter

- (4:22) LA – Jalen Clark 16 yard interception return, Kenneth Almendares kick (Louisiana 14–7)
- (0:23) JVST – Ron Wiggins 7 yard run, Garrison Rippa kick (Drive: 14 plays, 75 yards, 3:59; Tied 14–14)

Third Quarter

- (7:55) JVST – Garrison Rippa 22 yard field goal (Drive: 16 plays, 72 yards, 5:37; Jacksonville State 17–14)
- (5:47) LA – Chandler Fields 1 yard run, Kenneth Almendares kick (Drive: 6 plays, 73 yards, 2:08; Louisiana 21–17)
- (2:53) JVST – Logan Smothers 10 yard run, Garrison Rippa kick (Drive: 8 plays, 75 yards, 2:54; Jacksonville State 24–21)

Fourth Quarter

- (14:02) LA – Kenneth Almendares 33 yard field goal (Drive: 10 plays, 46 yards, 3:51; Tied 24–24)
- (5:32) LA – Tyree Skipper 43 yard interception return, Kenneth Almendares kick (Louisiana 31–24)
- (1:46) JVST – Perry Carter 18 yard pass from Zion Webb, Garrison Rippa kick (Drive: 8 plays, 70 yards, 1:51; Tied 31–31)

Overtime

- JVST – Garrison Rippa 27 yard field goal (Drive: 7 plays, 16 yards; Jacksonville State 34–31)

=== Statistics ===
Statistics	JSU	LA
First downs	31	14
Plays–yards	109–526	62–247
Rushes–yards	74–290	35–92
Passing yards	236	155
Passing: comp–att–int	20–35–3	13–27–0
Time of possession	33:00	27:00

Team	Category	Player	Statistics
Jacksonville State	Passing	Zion Webb	14/26, 156 yards, TD, 2 INT
Jacksonville State	Rushing	Ron Wiggins	27 carries, 126 yards, TD
Jacksonville State	Receiving	Quinton Lane	7 receptions, 86 yards
Louisiana	Passing	Chandler Fields	13/26, 155 yards
Louisiana	Rushing	Dre'lyn Washington	16 carries, 73 yards
Louisiana	Receiving	Pearse Migl	2 receptions, 34 yards
