= Kylan Guidry =

American gridiron football player (born 2001)

No. 44 – Montreal Alouettes
- Position: Defensive end
- Roster status: Practice roster
- CFL status: American

Personal information
- Born: September 14, 2001 (age 25)
- Listed height: 6 ft 4 in (1.93 m)
- Listed weight: 240 lb (109 kg)

Career information
- High school: Northwest (Opelousas, Louisiana)
- College: Kilgore College (2020–2021); Western Kentucky (2022–2024)
- NFL draft: 2025: undrafted

Career history
- Los Angeles Chargers (2025)*; Montreal Alouettes (2026–present)
- * Offseason or practice squad member only
- Stats at CFL.ca

Kylan Guidry (born September 14, 2001) is an American professional football defensive end for the Montreal Alouettes of the Canadian Football League (CFL). He played college football for the Kilgore College Rangers and Western Kentucky Hilltoppers.

== Early life ==
Guidry was born on September 14, 2001. He attended Northwest High School (Louisiana) in Opelousas, Louisiana.

== College career ==
Guidry played college football for the Kilgore College Rangers from 2020 to 2021 and Western Kentucky Hilltoppers from 2022 to 2024. At Western Kentucky, he played in 28 games, where he had 99 tackles, including 13 for loss, six sacks, one pass deflection, one forced fumble and fumble recovery.

== Professional career ==
Pre-draft measurables
Height	Weight	Arm length	Hand span	Wingspan	40-yard dash	10-yard split	20-yard split	20-yard shuttle	Three-cone drill	Vertical jump	Broad jump	Bench press
6 ft 3 in (1.91 m)	235 lb (107 kg)	35 3/8 in (0.90 m)	8 7/8 in (0.23 m)	6 ft 3 5/8 in (1.92 m)	4.66 s	1.58 s	2.49 s	4.53 s	6.97 s	34 in (0.86 m)	9 ft 8 in (2.95 m)	20 reps
All values from Pro day

=== Los Angeles Chargers ===
After not being selected in the 2025 NFL draft, Guidry signed with the Los Angeles Chargers of the National Football League (NFL) as an undrafted free agent. ON August 26, he was waived by the team.

=== Montreal Alouettes ===
On November 26, 2025, Guidry was signed by the Montreal Alouettes of the Canadian Football League (CFL). On May 30, 2026, he was signed to the practice roster. On June 26, Guidry was elevated to the active roster and made his debut against the Ottawa Redblacks in a depth role. On July 9, he reverted to the practice roster. On July 17, Guidry was promoted to the active roster. The following day, he made his first pass deflection against the Calgary Stampeders. On August 8, against the Edmonton Elks, Guidry blocked a punt and was recovered by Donovan Manuel, leading to a Davis Alexander touchdown. On September 8, he was re-signed to the practice roster.
