= Tyrice Knight =

American football player (born 2000)

No. 48 – Seattle Seahawks
- Position: Outside linebacker
- Roster status: Active

Personal information
- Born: December 20, 2000 (age 25); Lakeland, Florida, U.S.
- Listed height: 6 ft 0 in (1.83 m)
- Listed weight: 233 lb (106 kg)

Career information
- High school: Lake Gibson (Lakeland, Florida)
- College: Independence CC (2018–2019); UTEP (2020–2023)
- NFL draft: 2024: 4th round, 118th overall pick

Career history
- Seattle Seahawks (2024–present)

Awards and highlights
- Super Bowl champion (LX); First-team All-CUSA (2023); Second-team All-CUSA (2022)

Career NFL statistics as of Week 10, 2026
- Total tackles: 163
- Sacks: 3.5
- Forced fumbles: 2
- Fumble recoveries: 1
- Pass deflections: 2
- Stats at Pro Football Reference

Tyrice Knight (born December 20, 2000) is an American professional football outside linebacker for the Seattle Seahawks of the National Football League (NFL). He played college football for the Independence Pirates and UTEP Miners and was selected by the Seahawks in the fourth round of the 2024 NFL draft.

== Early life ==
Knight was born in Lakeland, Florida where he attended high school at Lake Gibson. In his junior season, Knight racked up 128 tackles with 61 being solo tackles. Coming out of high school, Knight would decide to commit to play college football at Independence Community College.

== College career ==
=== Independence CC ===
In Knight's career at Independence CC, Knight notched 58 tackles with four being for a loss, two fumble recoveries, four pass deflections, and five interceptions.

=== UTEP ===
After spending two years at Independence CC, Knight decided to commit to play Division I football for the UTEP Miners. In Knight's first season with UTEP in 2020, he totaled 54 tackles with two and a half going for a loss, and a sack. Knight finished the 2021 season with 102 tackles, where he was named Third-Team All Conference-USA. In the 2022 season, Knight totaled 95 tackles with six and a half going for a loss, one sack, an interception, five pass deflections, a fumble recovery, two forced fumbles, and a touchdown. Heading into the 2023 season, Knight was named to the Butkus and Bednarik award watch lists. In week three of the 2023 season, Knight was named the Conference USA defensive player of the week after posting 14 tackles against Northwestern. Knight finished the 2023 season with 140 tackles with 15.5 going for a loss, four and half sacks, seven pass deflections, two fumble recoveries, and a forced fumble. Knight would accept an invite to play in the 2024 Senior Bowl.

== Professional career ==
Pre-draft measurables
Height	Weight	Arm length	Hand span	Wingspan	40-yard dash	10-yard split	20-yard split	20-yard shuttle	Three-cone drill	Vertical jump	Broad jump	Bench press
6 ft 0 1/2 in (1.84 m)	233 lb (106 kg)	32 1/2 in (0.83 m)	9 1/4 in (0.23 m)	6 ft 8 3/8 in (2.04 m)	4.63 s	1.54 s	2.68 s	4.40 s	7.25 s	34.5 in (0.88 m)	9 ft 11 in (3.02 m)	21 reps
All values from NFL Combine

Knight was drafted by the Seattle Seahawks in the 4th round (118th overall) of the 2024 NFL Draft.

Knight took over starting duties mid-way through the 2024 season. He was one of only two defensive players in the 2024 season to receive recognition as the Pepsi NFL Rookie of the Week in Week 14 for his 12 tackles and 2 pass deflections.

In his second season, during a game against the Arizona Cardinals, Knight forced two fumbles against Arizona quarterback Jacoby Brissett, both of which were returned for touchdowns by teammate DeMarcus Lawrence. Knight played in Super Bowl LX, a 29–13 win over the New England Patriots.

== NFL career statistics ==
Legend
	Won the Super Bowl
**Bold**	Career high

=== Regular season ===
Year	Team	Games		Tackles					Interceptions						Fumbles				
Year	Team	GP	GS	Cmb	Solo	Ast	Sck	TFL	Int	Yds	Avg	Lng	TD	PD	FF	Fum	FR	Yds	TD
2024	SEA	16	9	**88**	**41**	**47**	1.5	3	0	0	0.0	0	0	**2**	0	0	**1**	**-2**	0
2025	SEA	16	4	57	37	20	**2.0**	**6**	0	0	0.0	0	0	0	**2**	0	0	0	0
2026	SEA	10	3	18	10	8	0.0	1	0	0	0.0	0	0	0	0	0	0	0	0
Career		42	16	163	88	75	3.5	10	0	0	0.0	0	0	2	2	0	1	-2	0

=== Postseason ===
Year	Team	Games		Tackles					Interceptions						Fumbles				
Year	Team	GP	GS	Cmb	Solo	Ast	Sck	TFL	Int	Yds	Avg	Lng	TD	PD	FF	Fum	FR	Yds	TD
2025	SEA	3	0	10	7	3	0.0	0	0	0	0.0	0	0	0	0	0	0	0	0
Career		3	0	10	7	3	0.0	0	0	0	0.0	0	0	0	0	0	0	0	0
