= Elijah Klein =

American football player (born 2000)

No. 67 – Detroit Lions
- Position: Offensive guard
- Roster status: Practice squad

Personal information
- Born: April 8, 2000 (age 26); Pomona, California, U.S.
- Listed height: 6 ft 4 in (1.93 m)
- Listed weight: 319 lb (145 kg)

Career information
- High school: Upland (Upland, California)
- College: UTEP (2018–2023)
- NFL draft: 2024: 6th round, 220th overall pick

Career history
- Tampa Bay Buccaneers (2024–2026); Detroit Lions (2026–present)*
- * Offseason or practice squad member only

Awards and highlights
- First-team All-C-USA (2023)

Career NFL statistics as of 2025
- Games played: 26
- Games started: 1
- Stats at Pro Football Reference

Elijah Blue Klein (born April 8, 2000) is an American professional football offensive guard for the Detroit Lions of the National Football League (NFL). He played college football for the UTEP Miners and was selected by the Tampa Bay Buccaneers in the sixth round of the 2024 NFL draft.

== Early life ==
Klein was born on April 8, 2000, in Pomona, California. He was raised in Mount Baldy, CA and attended Upland High School in Upland, California, where he played two years on the varsity team and was named first-team All-Baseline League as a senior. He committed to play college football for the UTEP Miners as a two-star recruit.

Klein became a starter on the offensive line as a true freshman at UTEP in 2018, starting four games before deciding to redshirt. He played eight games, six as a starter at right guard in 2019, and then started all eight games in the same position in 2020. He was named honorable mention All-Conference USA in 2021, while starting 13 games at right guard, and won the honor again in 2022 while starting 12 games at right guard. In his final season, 2023, he started 12 games and was named first-team All-Conference USA. He finished his collegiate career having started 55 games. Klein was invited to the 2024 East–West Shrine Bowl, but was not selected for the NFL Scouting Combine.

== Professional career ==
Pre-draft measurables
Height	Weight	Arm length	Hand span	Wingspan	40-yard dash	10-yard split	20-yard split	20-yard shuttle	Three-cone drill	Vertical jump	Broad jump	Bench press
6 ft 3 7/8 in (1.93 m)	306 lb (139 kg)	34 1/4 in (0.87 m)	10 1/8 in (0.26 m)	6 ft 10 1/4 in (2.09 m)	5.32 s	1.89 s	3.03 s	4.71 s	7.76 s	26.5 in (0.67 m)	8 ft 2 in (2.49 m)	25 reps
All values from Pro Day

=== Tampa Bay Buccaneers ===
Klein was selected in the sixth round (220th overall) of the 2024 NFL draft by the Tampa Bay Buccaneers.

On August 30, 2026, Klein was waived by the Buccaneers.

=== Detroit Lions ===
On September 1, 2026, Klein was signed to the Detroit Lions' practice squad.
