= Donovan Manuel =

American football player (born 2000)

No. 46 – Montreal Alouettes
- Position: Linebacker
- Roster status: Active
- CFL status: American

Personal information
- Born: February 7, 2000 (age 26)
- Listed height: 6 ft 1 in (1.85 m)
- Listed weight: 230 lb (104 kg)

Career information
- High school: Stockbridge (Stockbridge, Georgia)
- College: East Tennessee State (2018–2021); FIU (2022–2023)
- NFL draft: 2024: undrafted

Career history
- Minnesota Vikings (2024)*; Houston Roughnecks (2024)*; Montreal Alouettes (2026–present)
- * Offseason or practice squad member only

Awards and highlights
- Second-team All-C-USA (2023); 2× First-team All-SoCon (2020, 2021); SoCon All-Freshman Team (2019)
- Stats at CFL.ca

Donovan Manuel (born February 7, 2000) is an American professional football linebacker for the Montreal Alouettes of the Canadian Football League (CFL). He played college football for the East Tennessee State Buccaneers and FIU Panthers.

== Early life ==
Manuel was born on February 7, 2000. He attended Stockbridge High School in Stockbridge, Georgia, where as senior, he had 88 tackles, two interceptions, two forced fumbles and one fumble recovery.

== College career ==
Manuel played college football for the East Tennessee State Buccaneers from 2018 to 2021 and FIU Panthers from 2022 to 2023. He had 232 tackles, 7.5 sacks, three interceptions, two forced fumbles and fumble recoveries in 34 games. Manuel was named to the 2019 SoCon All-Freshman Team and was a two-time, first-team All-SoCon recipient in 2020 and 2021. In 2022, he transferred to Florida International University.

In 24 games, Manuel had 218 tackles, including 24 for loss, 1.5 sacks, six pass break ups, five forced fumbles and one fumble recovery. In 2023, he earned second-team All-C-USA honors.

== Professional career ==
Pre-draft measurables
Height	Weight	Arm length	Hand span	Wingspan	40-yard dash	10-yard split	20-yard split	20-yard shuttle	Three-cone drill	Vertical jump	Broad jump	Bench press
6 ft 0 in (1.83 m)	230 lb (104 kg)	31 1/8 in (0.79 m)	9 1/2 in (0.24 m)	6 ft 5 in (1.96 m)	4.81 s	1.53 s	2.72 s	4.35 s	7.18 s	34.5 in (0.88 m)	10 ft 2 in (3.10 m)	25 reps
All values from Pro day

=== Minnesota Vikings ===
After not being selected in the 2024 NFL draft, Manuel signed with the Minnesota Vikings of the National Football League (NFL) as an undrafted free agent. On May 16, he was waived by the team.

=== Houston Roughnecks ===
Manuel was selected in the in the fourth round, with the 26th overall selection, by the Houston Roughnecks in the 2024 UFL draft. On January 13, 2025, he was released by the team.

=== Montreal Alouettes ===
On February 9, 2026, Manuel was signed by the Montreal Alouettes of the Canadian Football League (CFL). On May 30, he was signed to the practice roster. On June 11, he was elevated to the active roster and made his CFL debut against the Toronto Argonauts.
