= Zion Webb =

American football player (born 1998)

No. 10
- Position: Quarterback

Personal information
- Born: December 22, 1998 (age 27); Columbus, Georgia, U.S.
- Listed height: 6 ft 1 in (1.85 m)
- Listed weight: 191 lb (87 kg)

Career information
- High school: Central High (Phenix City, Alabama)
- College: Jacksonville State (2017–2023)

Awards and highlights
- First team All-OVC (2020)
- Stats at ESPN

Zion Webb (born December 22, 1998) is an American former college football quarterback for the Jacksonville State Gamecocks.

== Early life ==
Webb grew up in Phenix City, Alabama and attended Central High School. He was rated a two-star recruit and committed to play college football at Jacksonville State over an offer from Georgia Southern.

== College career ==
Webb sat out for his true freshman season in 2017 and was redshirted. During the 2018 season, he made appearances in 10 games as a secondary quarterback and finished the season with throwing the ball 34 times for 444 yards, 5 touchdowns and an interception. During the 2019 season, he appeared in seven games and finished the season with throwing the ball 6 times for 148 yards and a touchdown. During the 2020 season, he appeared in 12 games and was named the starting quarterback, an All-OVC First Team passer and the OVC Offensive Player of the Week for three weeks. He finished the season with completing 120 out of 205 passing attempts for 1,777 yards, 13 touchdowns and 8 interceptions. Webb did not play for the 2021 fall season due to an injury he suffered in the spring season playoffs. During the 2022 season, he started in all 11 games of the season except for one. He finished the season with completing 111 out of 201 passing attempts for 1,737 yards, 10 touchdowns and 9 interceptions. During the 2023 season, Webb was granted eligibility to play for a seventh year.

== Professional career ==
Pre-draft measurables
Height	Weight
5 ft 11 5/8 in (1.82 m)	200 lb (91 kg)
