= 2024 Peach Bowl =

2024 Peach Bowl may refer to one of the following college football bowl games:

- 2023 Peach Bowl, played on December 30, 2023, between Ole Miss and Penn State
- 2025 Peach Bowl, played on January 1, 2025, between Texas and Arizona State
