= 2023 NCAA football bowl games =

In college football, 2023 NCAA football bowl games may refer to:

- 2022–23 NCAA football bowl games, for games played in January 2023 as part of the 2022 season.
- 2023–24 NCAA football bowl games, for games played in December 2023 as part of the 2023 season.
