= Ja'Wuan James =

American football player (born 1992)

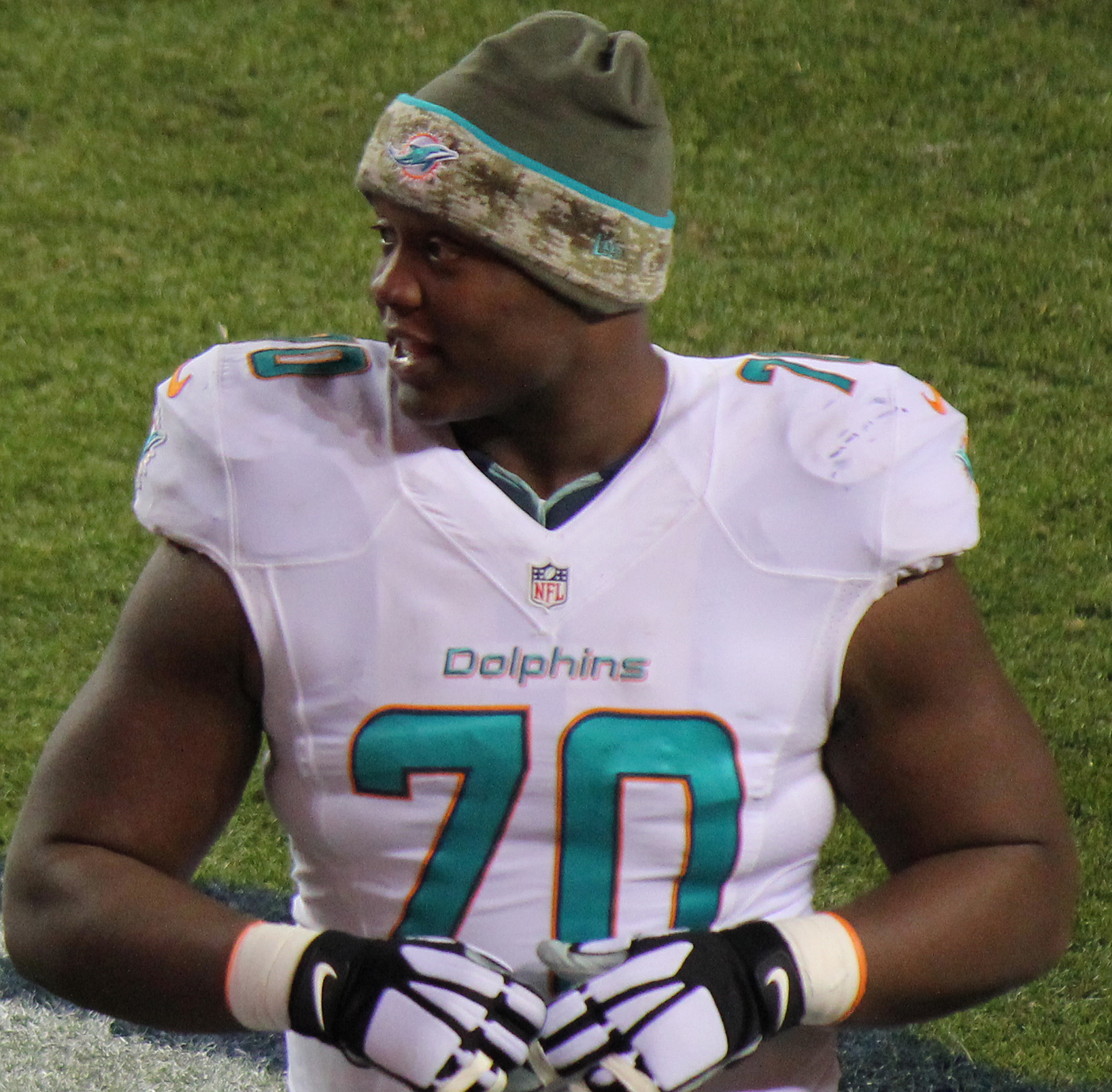
- James with the Miami Dolphins in 2014

No. 70
- Position: Offensive tackle

Personal information
- Born: June 3, 1992 (age 34); Atlanta, Georgia, U.S.
- Listed height: 6 ft 6 in (1.98 m)
- Listed weight: 312 lb (142 kg)

Career information
- High school: North Gwinnett (Suwanee, Georgia)
- College: Tennessee (2010–2013)
- NFL draft: 2014: 1st round, 19th overall pick

Career history
- Miami Dolphins (2014–2018); Denver Broncos (2019–2020); Baltimore Ravens (2021–2022)

Awards and highlights
- PFWA All-Rookie Team (2014); Second-team All-SEC (2013)

Career NFL statistics
- Games played: 66
- Games started: 66
- Stats at Pro Football Reference

Ja'Wuan Amir James (born June 3, 1992) is an American former professional football player who was an offensive tackle in the National Football League (NFL). He was selected by the Miami Dolphins in the first round of the 2014 NFL draft. He played college football for the Tennessee Volunteers and in the NFL for the Denver Broncos and Baltimore Ravens.

== Early life ==
James was born in Atlanta to Nichelle James-Mickens and Burkley James. He grew up in New Jersey and moved to Atlanta in eighth grade. Throughout his childhood he mainly played basketball and briefly played baseball before becoming bored with it. He decided to play football after moving to Georgia.

James attended North Gwinnett High School in Suwanee, Georgia, where he was teammates with Austin Shepherd, an offensive tackle. In his sophomore season, North Gwinnett advanced to the GHSA Class 5A state championship game with 13–2 record, where they lost 34–6 to Valdosta Lowndes led by Greg Reid and Telvin Smith. As a junior, James helped North Gwinnett to a berth in state quarterfinals behind 10–3 finish, where they lost 20–3 to Alec Ogletree's Newnan. In James's senior season, North Gwinnett finished with a 13–1 mark, earning Region 7-5A championship while advancing to the state quarterfinals, where they lost 35–0 to Camden County. After the season, James was selected Class 5A All-State by Georgia Sportswriters, and was invited to play in the 2010 Under Armour All-America Game in St. Petersburg, Florida.

Considered to be a four-star recruit by Rivals.com, he was rated the eighth best offensive tackle prospect in his class and the sixth best prospect from Georgia. He was such a highly sought after prospect that Tennessee's head coach Lane Kiffin wanted to land a helicopter on North Gwinnett's softball field in an attempt to impress James, but was unable to receive clearance from the high school.

== College career ==
James attended the University of Tennessee from 2010 to 2013. He started 49 consecutive games for the Volunteers, all at right tackle. His 49 starts set a record for career starts by an offensive lineman in Tennessee history (passing Jeff Smith's 48 starts from 1992 to 1995). He played on an elite offensive line that produced four NFL offensive linemen with three of them going on to become starters.

== Professional career ==
=== Pre-draft ===
On December 9, 2013, it was announced that James and teammate Daniel McCullers had accepted their invitations to the 2014 Senior Bowl. On January 24, 2014, it was reported that James would unfortunately miss the Reese's Senior Bowl after suffering a sprained knee during practice. His performances at practice were well-received and helped his draft stock. James was one of 50 collegiate linemen to attend the NFL Scouting Combine in Indianapolis, Indiana. Tennessee had a record four offensive linemen attend the combine, that include James, James Stone, Antonio Richardson, and Zach Fulton. He performed all of the combine drills well and finished sixth among all offensive linemen in the three-cone drill and ninth in the short shuttle. On April 2, 2014, he attended Tennessee's pro day, along with Fulton, Richardson, Stone, McCullers, Jacques Smith, Rajion Neal, Michael Palardy, and seven other prospects. He opted to stand on his combine numbers and only performed positional drills for scouts and representatives from all 32 NFL teams, that included Seattle Seahawks' offensive line coach Tom Cable. During the draft process, James had private workouts and meetings with a few teams, including the Tennessee Titans and Miami Dolphins. At the conclusion of the pre-draft process, James projected to be a first to third round pick by NFL draft experts and scouts. He was ranked the sixth best offensive tackle prospect by NFLDraftScout.com, the ninth best offensive tackle in the draft by NFL analyst Mike Mayock, and 15th best offensive linemen by Sports Illustrated.

Pre-draft measurables
Height	Weight	Arm length	Hand span	40-yard dash	10-yard split	20-yard split	20-yard shuttle	Three-cone drill	Vertical jump	Broad jump	Bench press
6 ft 6 in (1.98 m)	311 lb (141 kg)	35 in (0.89 m)	9 7/8 in (0.25 m)	5.34 s	1.86 s	3.08 s	4.56 s	7.42 s	29 in (0.74 m)	8 ft 7 in (2.62 m)	22 reps
All values from NFL Combine

=== Miami Dolphins ===
==== 2014 ====
The Miami Dolphins selected James in the first round (19th overall) of the 2014 NFL draft. He was the fourth offensive linemen selected in 2014. James was the highest selected Tennessee Volunteers offensive lineman since Charles McRae and Antone Davis in 1991. On June 19, 2014, the Dolphins signed James to a fully guaranteed four-year, $8.42 million contract that includes a signing bonus of $4.44 million. James entered training camp slated as the starting right tackle with newly acquired free agent Branden Albert starting on the blindside. Head coach Joe Philbin named James the official starting right tackle to begin the regular season.

He made his first career start and professional regular season debut in the Dolphins' season-opening 33–20 victory over the New England Patriots. In the first four games, James yielded only one sack and ranked as the tenth best run blocker and 20th best offensive tackles overall among the 67 offensive tackles that qualified. He was considered an improvement over former starting right tackles Tyson Clabo and Jonathan Martin. In Week 10, he was moved to left tackle after starter Albert was placed on injured reserve for the remainder of the season after suffering a knee injury. He started 16 games for the Dolphins in 2014. He was named to the PFWA All-Rookie Team.

==== 2015 ====
James returned to the starting right tackle position to start training camp and remained the starter to begin the regular season. He started the first seven games of the 2015 season before suffering a toe injury and being placed on injured reserve for the rest of the season. James finished with seven starts on the 2015 season.

==== 2016 ====
James remained the starting right tackle, opposite Albert, to begin the 2016 season under new head coach Adam Gase. The Dolphins drafted the top ranked offensive tackle prospect Laremy Tunsil with the 13th overall pick, but opted to use him as an offensive guard for his first season.

He started 16 consecutive games at right tackle and helped the Dolphins achieve a 10–6 record and place second in the AFC East. On January 8, 2017, James started in his first career playoff game as the Dolphins were defeated 30-12 by the Pittsburgh Steelers in the AFC Wild Card Round.

==== 2017 ====
On May 1, 2017, the Miami Dolphins exercised the fifth-year, $9.34 million option on James' rookie contract for the 2018 season. He started the first eight games of the season at right tackle before suffering a hamstring injury in Week 9 against the Oakland Raiders on Sunday Night Football. He was placed on injured reserve on November 11, 2017.

==== 2018 ====
James started 15 games at right tackle in 2018, missing one game with a knee injury.

=== Denver Broncos ===
On March 13, 2019, James signed a four-year, $51 million deal with the Denver Broncos. He only played in three games in 2019 due to a knee injury suffered in Week 1. On August 3, 2020, he announced he would opt out of the 2020 season due to the COVID-19 pandemic.

On May 4, 2021, James tore his Achilles tendon while training away from the team facility. He was placed on the reserve/non-football injury list on May 7. and released from the list on May 14.

=== Baltimore Ravens ===
On June 10, 2021, James signed a two-year, $9 million contract with the Baltimore Ravens. He was placed on the reserve/non-football injury list on August 31, to start the season. On December 8, James was designated to return to practice from reserve/non-football injury list.

On September 14, 2022, the Ravens placed James on injured reserve after he tore his Achilles tendon again in the 2022 season opener against the New York Jets.

=== NFL career statistics ===
Year	Team	Games	Starts
2014	MIA	16	16
2015	MIA	7	7
2016	MIA	16	16
2017	MIA	8	8
2018	MIA	15	15
2019	DEN	3	3
Career		65	65

== Personal life ==
On July 12, 2017, James announced via Twitter that he and his longtime college girlfriend Rainey Gaffin were engaged. She played for the Tennessee softball team from 2013 to 2016.
