= 2024 Hula Bowl =

American college football all-star game

2024 Caribe Royale Orlando Hula Bowl
- 78th Hula Bowl
| Team Kai | Team Aina |
| 24 | 17 |
| Head coach: Brian Billick | Head coach: Mike Smith |
| | 1 | 2 | 3 | 4 | Total |
|---|---|---|---|---|---|
| Team Kai | 3 | 14 | 7 | 0 | 24 |
| Team Aina | 0 | 3 | 0 | 14 | 17 |
- Date: January 13, 2024
- Season: 2023
- Stadium: FBC Mortgage Stadium
- Location: Orlando, Florida
- MVP: Offense: Blake Watson (RB, Memphis); Defense: Jason Johnson (LB, UCF)
- Referee: Michael Vandervelde

United States TV coverage
- Network: CBS Sports Network
- Announcers: Jamie Seh (play-by-play), Brian Baldinger (color), Emory Hunt (sideline), Smacker Miles (sideline)

The 2024 Hula Bowl was a postseason college football all-star game played on January 13, 2024, with kickoff at 12:00 noon EST, at FBC Mortgage Stadium in Orlando, Florida. It was the first all-star contest of the 2023–24 bowl games and, while not restricted to FBS players, one of the final games of the 2023 FBS football season. Television coverage was provided by CBS Sports Network. This was the third playing of the Hula Bowl outside of Hawaii, due to Aloha Stadium near Honolulu being closed for renovations. The game rostered players into Aina and Kai teams, the words for land and sea in the Hawaiian language. Through sponsorship from the Caribe Royale Orlando, the game was officially named the 2024 Caribe Royale Orlando Hula Bowl.

== Players ==
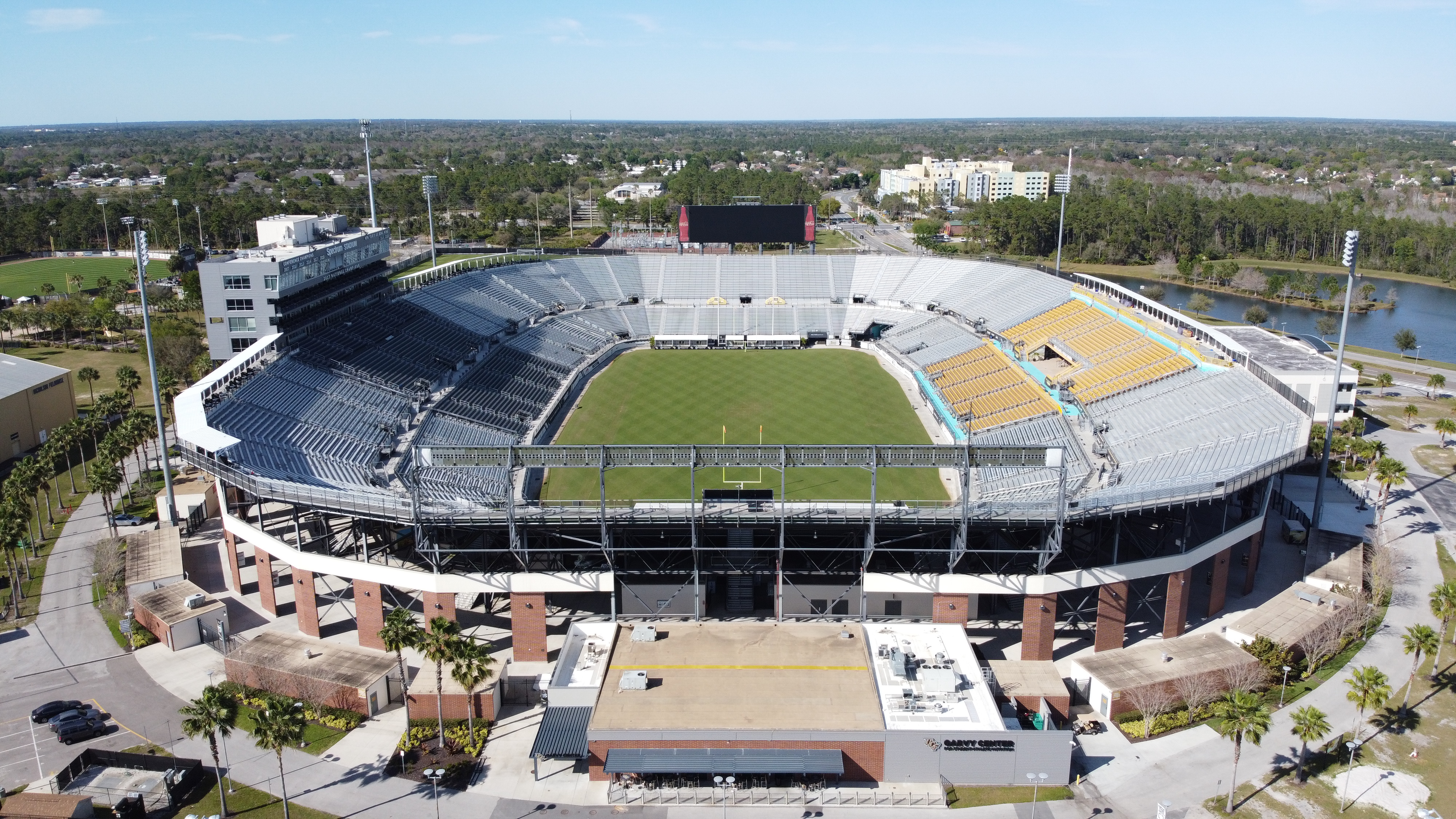
FBC Mortgage Stadium in February 2020

Full roster are available online (link)(link); note that a number may be shared by an offensive and defensive player.

=== Team Aina ===
Coach: Mike Smith

| No. | Player | Position | HT/WT | College | Notes |
|---|---|---|---|---|---|
| 10 | John Rhys Plumlee | QB | 6'0/199 | UCF | |
| 6 | Ben Bryant | QB | 6'3/213 | Northwestern | |
| 4 | Spencer Sanders | QB | 6'0/211 | Ole Miss | |
| 5 | Jason Bean | QB | 6'1/180 | Kansas | |
| 1 | Emani Bailey | RB | 5'7/202 | TCU | |
| 24 | George Holani | RB | 5'10/203 | Boise State | |
| 21 | Blake Watson | RB | 5'9/187 | Memphis | |
| 7 | Jabari Small | RB | 5'9/205 | Tennessee | |

=== Team Kai ===
Coach: Brian Billick

| No. | Player | Position | HT/WT | College | Notes |
|---|---|---|---|---|---|
| 2 | Carter Bradley | QB | 6'2/221 | South Alabama | |
| 11 | Davius Richard | QB | 6'2/221 | NC Central (FCS) | |
| 13 | Jack Plummer | QB | 6'4/220 | Louisville | |
| 23 | Deshaun Fenwick | RB | 6'1/218 | Oregon State | |
| 1 | Austin Jones | RB | 5'9/211 | USC | |
| 3 | Tyrone Tracy | RB | 5'11/208 | Purdue | |
| 5 | Michael Wiley | RB | 5'10/209 | Arizona | |

== See also ==
- 2024 NFL draft
