= Austin Shepherd =

American football player (born 1992)

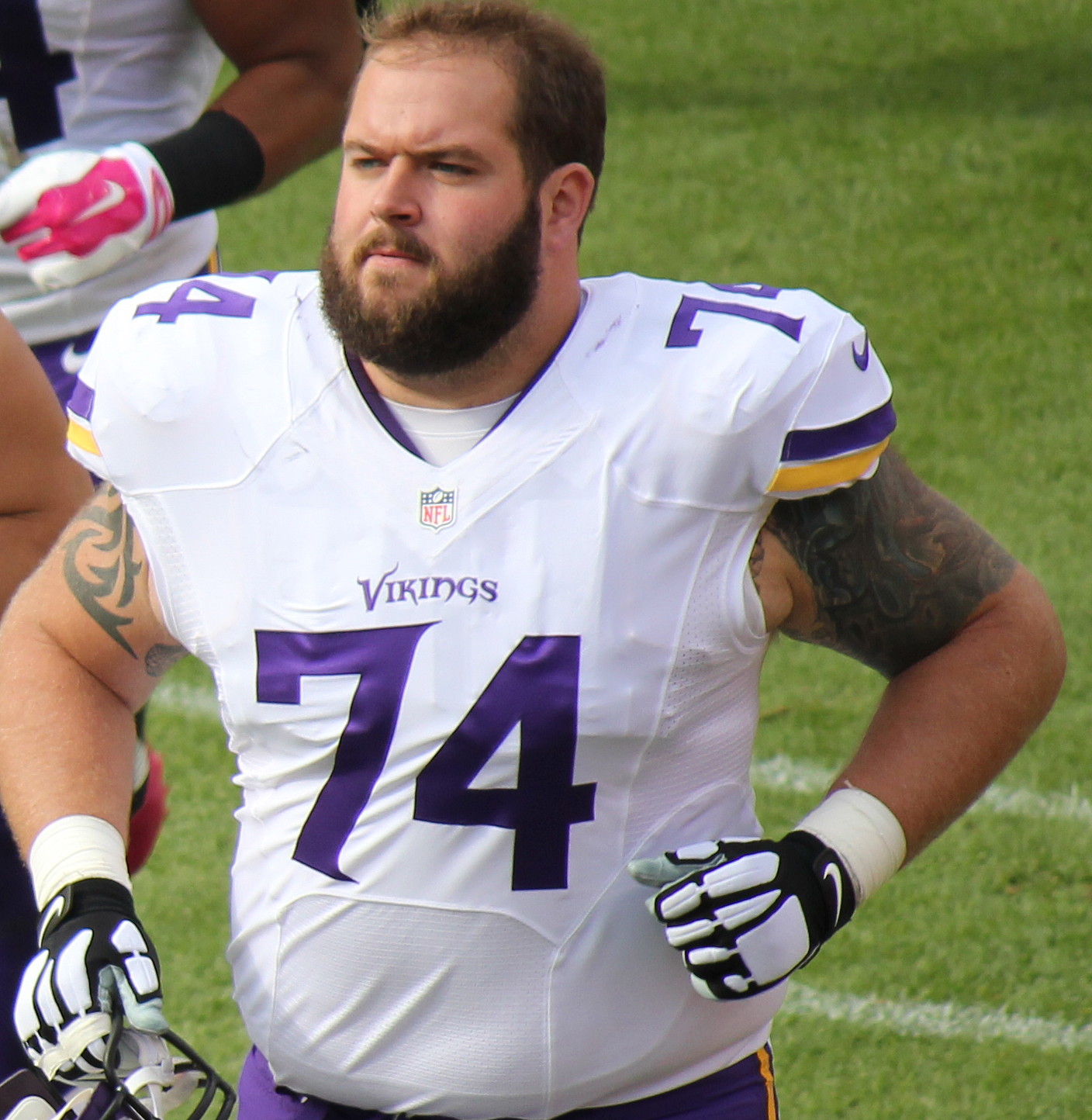
- Shepherd with the Minnesota Vikings in 2015

Duke Blue Devils
- Title: Associate offensive line coach

Personal information
- Born: May 28, 1992 (age 34); Suwanee, Georgia, U.S.
- Listed height: 6 ft 4 in (1.93 m)
- Listed weight: 327 lb (148 kg)

Career information
- High school: North Gwinnett (Suwanee)
- College: Alabama
- NFL draft: 2015: 7th round, 228th overall pick

Career history

Playing
- Minnesota Vikings (2015); San Diego Chargers (2016)*; Pittsburgh Steelers (2016)*; Minnesota Vikings (2016–2017)*
- * Offseason or practice squad member only

Coaching
- Florida Atlantic (2020) Graduate assistant; Ole Miss (2021) Graduate assistant; Duke (2024–present) Associate offensive line coach

Operations
- Louisiana (2022–2023) Director of recruiting & football logistics

Awards and highlights
- BCS national champion (2012, 2013); Second-team All-SEC (2014)

Career NFL statistics
- Games played: 14
- Stats at Pro Football Reference

Austin H. Shepherd (born May 28, 1992) is an American former professional football player who was an offensive tackle in the National Football League (NFL). He played college football for the Alabama Crimson Tide. He was selected by the Minnesota Vikings in the seventh round of the 2015 NFL draft. He was also a member of the San Diego Chargers and Pittsburgh Steelers.

== Early life ==
Shepherd attended North Gwinnett High School in Suwanee, Georgia, where he was teammates with Ja'Wuan James. In his sophomore season, North Gwinnett advanced to the GHSA Class 5A state championship game with 13–2 record, where they lost 34–6 to Valdosta Lowndes led by Greg Reid and Telvin Smith. As a junior, Shepherd helped North Gwinnett to a berth in state quarterfinals behind 10–3 finish, where they lost 20–3 to Alec Ogletree's Newnan. In Shepherd's senior season, North Gwinnett finished with a 13–1 mark, earning Region 7-5A championship while advancing to the state quarterfinals, where they lost 35–0 to Camden County.

He was ranked by Rivals.com as the No. 18 guard and No. 22 by Scout.com, while ESPN.com ranked him 46th nationally as an offensive tackle. He was also ranked 13th on Atlanta Journal-Constitution Georgia Top 50. Regarded as a three-star recruit by Rivals.com, Shepherd chose Alabama over Georgia Tech, Clemson, South Carolina and UAB. He enrolled in January 2010 and participated in spring drills for the Crimson Tide.

== Professional career ==
Pre-draft measurables
Height	Weight	40-yard dash	10-yard split	20-yard split	20-yard shuttle	Three-cone drill	Vertical jump	Broad jump	Bench press
6 ft 4 in (1.93 m)	315 lb (143 kg)	5.27 s	1.81 s	3.01 s	4.70 s	7.77 s	29 in (0.74 m)	7 ft 10 in (2.39 m)	17 reps
All values from NFL Combine and Pro Day

=== Minnesota Vikings (first stint) ===
Shepherd was selected by the Minnesota Vikings with the 228th overall pick in the 2015 NFL draft. He was signed to a four-year, $2.34 million contract with a $69,694 signing bonus. He was released on August 29, 2016.

=== San Diego Chargers ===
On September 4, 2016, Shepherd was signed to the practice squad of the San Diego Chargers. On September 20, 2016, he was released from the practice squad.

=== Pittsburgh Steelers ===
On October 11, 2016, Shepherd was signed to the Pittsburgh Steelers' practice squad. He was released by the team on October 19, 2016.

=== Minnesota Vikings (second stint) ===
On October 25, 2016, Shepherd was signed to the Vikings' practice squad. He signed a reserve/futures contract with the Vikings on January 2, 2017.

On September 2, 2017, Shepherd was waived by the Vikings.

== Coaching career ==
In 2020, after Shepherd's playing career he joined Florida Atlantic as a graduate assistant. In 2021, he took the same role with Ole Miss. In 2022, he moved to an off-the-field role as the director of recruiting and football logistics for Louisiana.

In 2024, Shepherd was hired by Duke as an offensive analyst. In 2025, he was promoted to associate offensive line coach. He is married to the former Elise Petitjean.
