= 2023 Peach Bowl =

College football bowl game

2023 Chick-fil-A Peach Bowl
- CFP New Year's Six; 56th Peach Bowl
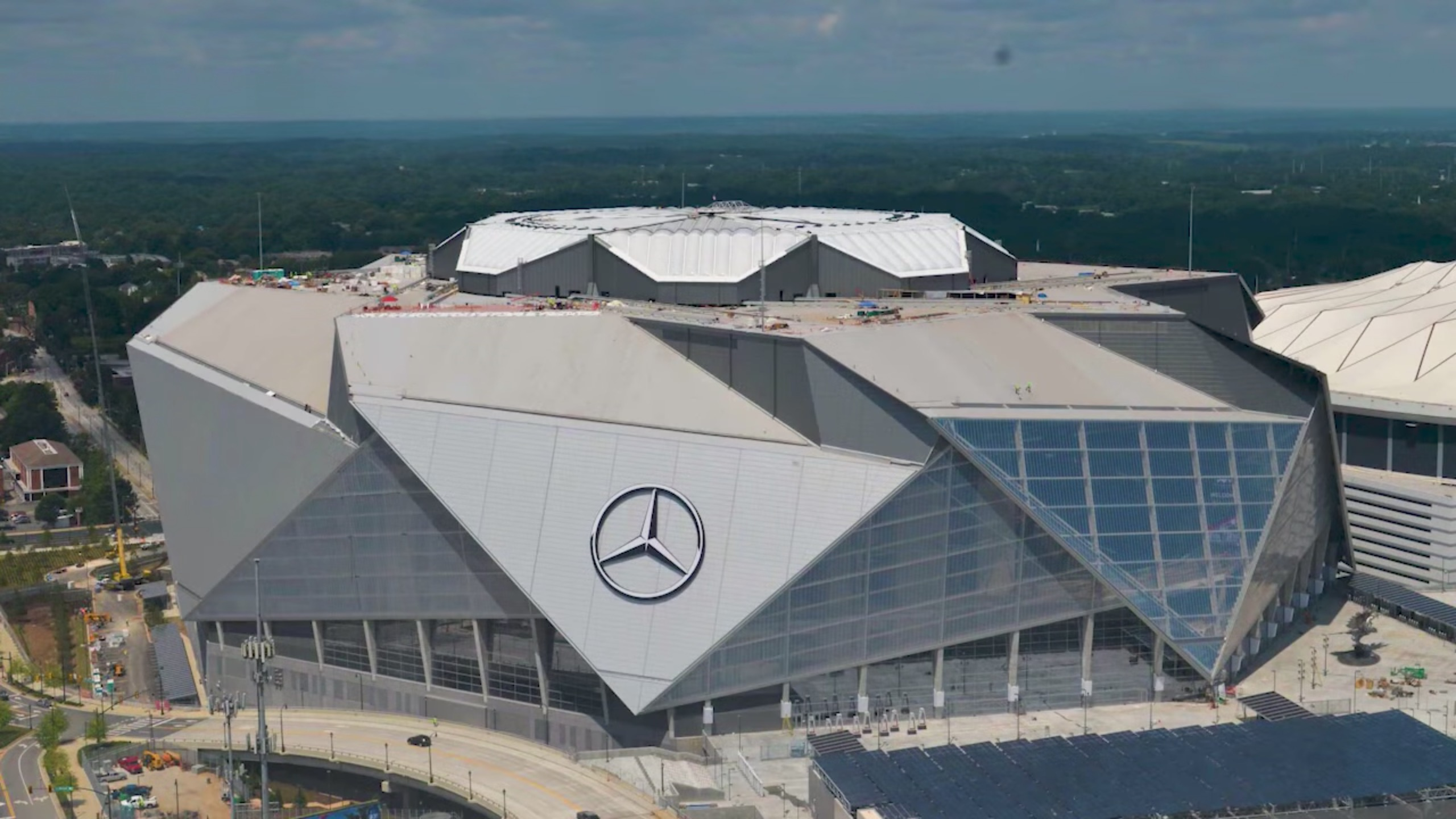
- Mercedes-Benz Stadium in Atlanta, Georgia, hosted the Peach Bowl.
Ole Miss Rebels	Penn State Nittany Lions
(10–2)	(10–2)
SEC	Big Ten
38	25
Head coach: Lane Kiffin	Head coach: James Franklin
AP / Coaches / CFP; 11 / 11 / 11	AP / Coaches / CFP; 10 / 10 / 10
	1	2	3	4	Total
Ole Miss	10	10	11	7	38
Penn State	3	14	0	8	25
- Date: December 30, 2023
- Season: 2023
- Stadium: Mercedes-Benz Stadium
- Location: Atlanta, Georgia
- MVP: Caden Prieskorn (TE, Ole Miss) & Jared Ivey (DE, Ole Miss)
- Favorite: Penn State by 5.5
- Referee: Mike McCabe (Pac-12)
- Attendance: 71,230

United States TV coverage
- Network: ESPN; ESPN Radio
- Announcers: ESPN: Mark Jones (play-by-play), Louis Riddick (analyst), and Quint Kessenich (sideline); ESPN Radio: Marc Kestecher (play-by-play), Kelly Stouffer (analyst), and Ian Fitzsimmons (sideline)

International TV coverage
- Network: ESPN Brazil
- Announcers: Thiago Alves (play-by-play) and Weinny Eirado (analyst)

The 2023 Peach Bowl was a college football bowl game played on December 30, 2023, at Mercedes-Benz Stadium in Atlanta, Georgia. The 56th annual Peach Bowl game featured Ole Miss of the Southeastern Conference (SEC) and Penn State of the Big Ten Conference—teams selected at-large by the College Football Playoff selection committee. The game began at 12:00 p.m. EST and aired on ESPN. The Peach Bowl was one of the 2023–24 bowl games concluding the 2023 FBS football season. The game was sponsored by restaurant chain Chick-fil-A and was officially known as the Chick-fil-A Peach Bowl.

== Teams ==
The game featured the Ole Miss Rebels against the Penn State Nittany Lions. It was the first ever matchup between the two teams.

=== Ole Miss ===
The Rebels came into the game ranked 11th in each of the major polls, with a 10–2 record (6–2 SEC); they were led by head coach Lane Kiffin. Their two losses were to Alabama and Georgia.

This was Ole Miss's third Peach Bowl appearance; the Rebels previously won the 1971 edition and lost the 2014 edition.

=== Penn State ===
The Nittany Lions came into the game ranked 10th in each of the major polls, with a 10–2 record (7–2 Big 10); they were led by head coach James Franklin. Their two losses were to Ohio State and Michigan.

This was Penn State's first Peach Bowl appearance.

== Game summary ==
2023 Chick-fil-A Peach Bowl

Quarter	1	2	3	4	Total
No. 11 Ole Miss	10	10	11	7	38
No. 10 Penn State	3	14	0	8	25

at Mercedes-Benz Stadium • Atlanta, Georgia

- Date: Saturday, December 30, 2023
- Game time: 12:00 p.m. EST
- Game weather: n/a (game played indoors)
- Game attendance: 71,230
- Referee: Mike McCabe
- TV announcers (ESPN): Mark Jones (play-by-play), Louis Riddick (analyst), and Quint Kessenich (sideline)
- Box score

Game information

First quarter

- (9:17) PSU – Alex Felkins 26 yard field goal (Drive: 10 plays, 64 yards, 4:58; Penn State 3–0)
- (7:16) MISS – Caden Davis 36 yard field goal (Drive: 8 plays, 56 yards, 2:01; Tied 3–3)
- (0:30) MISS – Caden Prieskorn 6 yard pass from Jaxson Dart, Caden Davis kick (Drive: 10 plays, 77 yards, 3:31; Ole Miss 10–3)

Second quarter

- (13:34) PSU – Theo Johnson 2-yard TD pass from Drew Allar, Alex Felkins kick (Drive: 6 plays, 75 yards, 1:56; Tied 10–10)
- (10:33) MISS – Caden Davis 45 yard field goal (Drive: 9 plays, 52 yards, 3:01; Ole Miss 13–10)
- (4:58) MISS – Caden Prieskorn 37 yard pass from Jaxson Dart, Caden Davis kick (Drive: 9 plays, 83 yards, 4:03; Ole Miss 20–10)
- (2:45) PSU – Nicholas Singleton 48 yard pass from Beau Pribula, Alex Felkins kick (Drive: 4 plays, 75 yards, 2:13; Ole Miss 20–17)

Third quarter

- (10:48) MISS – Caden Davis 52 yard field goal (Drive: 9 plays, 40 yards, 2:45; Ole Miss 23–17)
- (4:10) MISS – Quinshon Judkins 14 yard pass from Jaxson Dart, 2-point pass good (Drive: 10 plays, 82 yards, 4:29; Ole Miss 31–17)

Fourth quarter

- (6:29) MISS – Jaxson Dart 2 yard rush, Caden Davis kick (Drive: 10 plays, 65 yards, 4:26; Ole Miss 38–17)
- (4:14) PSU – Harrison Wallace III 14 yard pass from Drew Allar, Beau Pribula pass to Nicholas Singleton (Drive: 4 plays, 70 yards, 0:54; Ole Miss 38–25)

=== Statistics ===
Statistics	MISS	PSU
First downs	30	21
Plays–yards	540	510
Rushes–yards	146	167
Passing yards	394	343
Passing: comp–att–int	26–41–0	20–40–1
Time of possession	33:38	26:22

Team	Category	Player	Statistics
Ole Miss	Passing	Jaxson Dart	25/40, 379 yards, 3 TD
Ole Miss	Rushing	Quinshon Judkins	34 carries, 106 yards
Ole Miss	Receiving	Caden Prieskorn	10 receptions, 136 yards, 2 TD
Penn State	Passing	Drew Allar	19/39, 295 yards, 2 TD, 1 INT
Penn State	Rushing	Kaytron Allen	10 carries, 51 yards
Penn State	Receiving	Tyler Warren	5 receptions, 127 yards, 2 TD
