= 2023–24 NCAA football bowl games =

Series of college football bowl games following the 2023 season

- Season: 2023
- Number of bowls: 60 total: 43 in DI (Note: 41 FBS bowl games, the College Football Playoff National Championship Game, and 1 FCS bowl game); 4 in DII; 13 in DIII
- All-star games: 4 FBS, 1 FCS
- Bowl games: December 16, 2023 – January 8, 2024 (Note: Dates reflect Division I team-competitive bowl games, and exclude all-star games and bowl games in lower divisions.)
- National Championship: 2024 College Football Playoff; National Championship
- Location of Championship: NRG Stadium; Houston, Texas
- Champions: Michigan Wolverines
- Bowl Challenge Cup winner: Big Ten
Bowl record by conference
Conference	Bowls	Record	Number of teams in final AP poll
ACC	11	5–6 (0.455)	4
American	6	3–3 (0.500)	1
Big 12	9	5–4 (0.556)	5
Big Ten	10	6–4 (0.600)	4
C–USA	4	2–2 (0.500)	1
MAC	6	2–4 (0.333)	0
Mountain West	7	3–4 (0.429)	0
Pac-12	9	5–4 (0.556)	3
SEC	9	5–4 (0.556)	6
Sun Belt	12	5–7 (0.417)	0
Independent	1	1–0 (1.000)	1

The 2023–24 NCAA football bowl games were a series of college football bowl games in the United States, primarily played to complete the 2023 NCAA Division I FBS football season. Team-competitive bowl games in FBS began on December 16 and concluded with the 2024 College Football Playoff National Championship on January 8, 2024, which was won by the Michigan Wolverines. The all-star portion began on January 13 and concluded on February 24.

== Schedule ==
The schedule for the 2023–24 bowl games, announced in May 2023, is below. All times listed using EST (UTC−5).

=== Division I FBS bowl games ===
==== College Football Playoff bowl games ====
Locations of 2023–24 CFP bowls
– National Championship, – Semifinal Bowl, – Non-semifinal bowl

The College Football Playoff system is used to determine a national championship of Division I FBS college football. A committee of experts ranked the top 25 teams in the nation after each of the last seven weeks of the regular season. The top four teams (Note: The playoff expanded to 12 teams for the 2024–25 bowl season.) in the final ranking are then seeded in a single-elimination semifinal round, with the winners advanced to the National Championship game. This playoff was the last to use a four-team bracket, with the College Football Playoff set to expand to 12 teams in 2024.

The semifinal games for the 2023 season were the Rose Bowl and the Sugar Bowl. Both were played on January 1, 2024, as part of a yearly rotation of three pairs of two bowls, commonly referred to as the New Year's Six bowl games. The winners advanced to the 2024 College Football Playoff National Championship that was contested on January 8, 2024, at NRG Stadium in Houston, Texas.

On December 3, 2023, the College Football Playoff committee announced that it had selected Michigan, Washington, Texas, and Alabama to participate in the 2023–24 College Football Playoff. The committee's decision to select the Southeastern Conference's (SEC) Alabama (12–1) instead of the Atlantic Coast Conference's (ACC) Florida State (13–0), who became the first undefeated Power Five conference team to not qualify for the playoff, received intense criticism from fans, writers, and commentators. Specifically, several of these viewers accused the committee of corruption, bias, and favoritism towards the SEC. The CFP committee chair and others defended the selection of Alabama, which defeated five ranked teams (compared to Florida State's three) during the season, including No. 1 ranked Georgia in the last game of the SEC season, saying that Alabama was currently the better team overall.

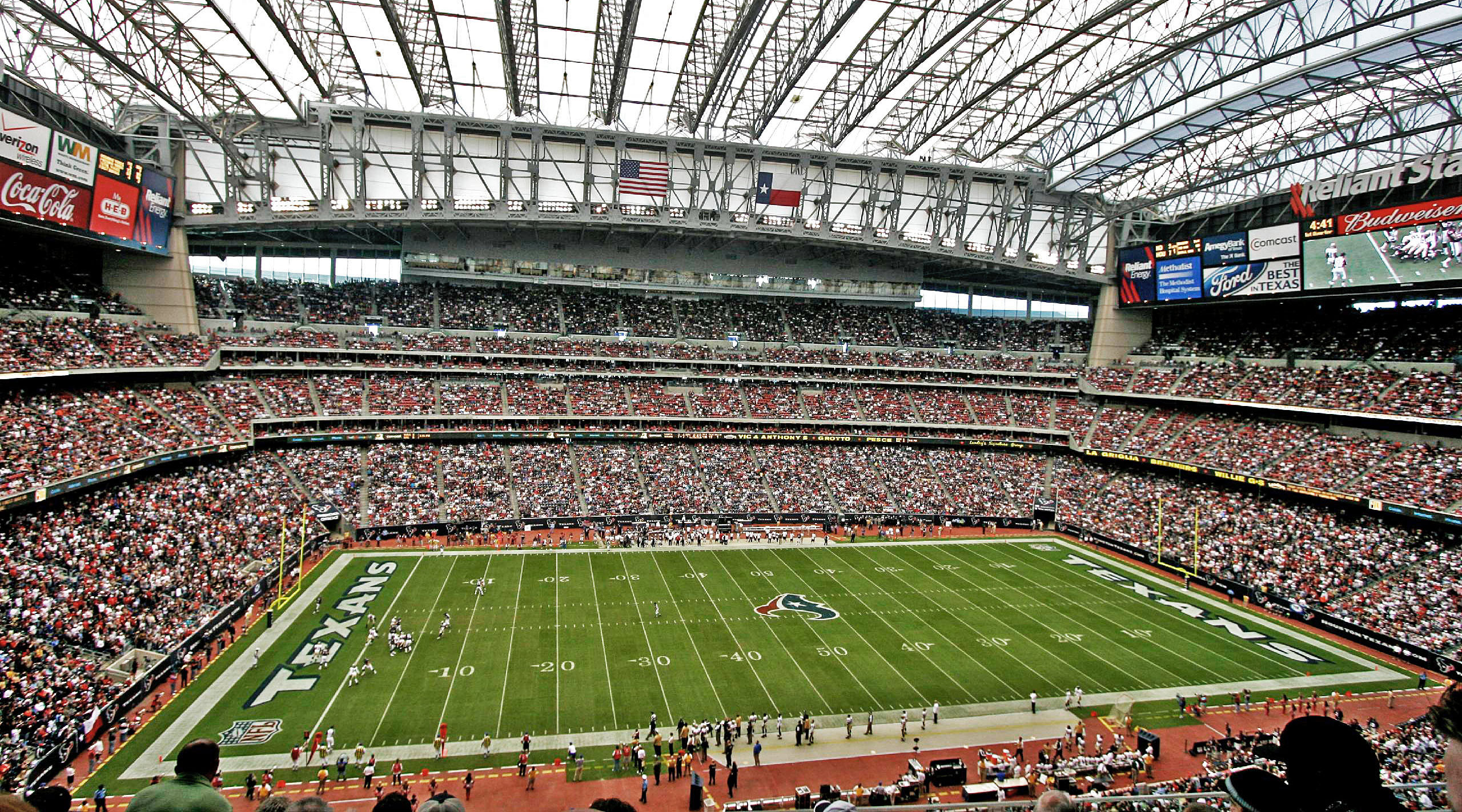
Interior view of NRG Stadium, site of the championship game

Semifinals
January 1 – Rose Bowl Rose Bowl Stadium, Pasadena
1	Michigan (OT)	27
4	Alabama	20
January 1 – Sugar Bowl Caesars Superdome, New Orleans
2	Washington	37
3	Texas	31

Championship
January 8 – National Championship NRG Stadium, Houston
1	Michigan	34
2	Washington	13

Each of the games in the following table was televised by ESPN.

New Year's Six bowl games
Date	Time (EST)	Game	Site	Teams	Affiliations	Results	Attendance	U.S viewers (millions)
Dec. 29	8:00 p.m.	Cotton Bowl Classic	AT&T Stadium; Arlington, Texas	No. 9 Missouri Tigers (10–2); No. 7 Ohio State Buckeyes (11–1)	SEC; Big Ten	Missouri 14; Ohio State 3	70,114	9.72
Dec. 30	12:00 p.m.	Peach Bowl	Mercedes-Benz Stadium; Atlanta, Georgia	No. 11 Ole Miss Rebels (10–2); No. 10 Penn State Nittany Lions (10–2)	SEC; Big Ten	Ole Miss 38; Penn State 25	71,230	7.76
Dec. 30	4:00 p.m.	Orange Bowl	Hard Rock Stadium; Miami Gardens, Florida	No. 6 Georgia Bulldogs (12–1); No. 5 Florida State Seminoles (13–0)	SEC; ACC	Georgia 63; Florida State 3	63,324	10.39
Jan. 1	1:00 p.m.	Fiesta Bowl	State Farm Stadium; Glendale, Arizona	No. 8 Oregon Ducks (11–2); No. 23 Liberty Flames (13–0) (Note: The Liberty Flames were one of only four FBS teams in 2023 with an undefeated pre-bowl season, but finished much lower in the CFP rankings as they compete in Conference USA (C-USA), one of the Group of Five conferences, generally regarded as less challenging than the Power Five conferences. However, they are the first C-USA team to compete at this level of bowl game in the history of the Bowl Championship Series (1998–2013) and the subsequent College Football Playoff system, introduced in 2014.)	Pac-12; C–USA	Oregon 45; Liberty 6	47,769	4.59
Jan. 1	5:00 p.m.	Rose Bowl (Playoff semifinal game)	Rose Bowl; Pasadena, California	No. 1 Michigan Wolverines (13–0)†; No. 4 Alabama Crimson Tide (12–1)†	Big Ten; SEC	Michigan 27; Alabama 20 ^{(OT)}	96,371	26.10/27.75*
Jan. 1	8:45 p.m.	Sugar Bowl (Playoff semifinal game)	Caesars Superdome; New Orleans, Louisiana	No. 2 Washington Huskies (13–0)†; No. 3 Texas Longhorns (12–1)†	Pac-12; Big 12	Washington 37; Texas 31	68,791	17.67/18.74*
Jan. 8	7:30 p.m.	College Football Playoff National Championship	NRG Stadium; Houston, Texas	No. 1 Michigan Wolverines (14–0)‡ No. 2 Washington Huskies (14–0)‡	Big Ten; Pac-12	Michigan 34; Washington 13	72,808	24.28/25.03*

† Semifinal teams were chosen by the selection committee.
‡ Semifinal winners advanced to the championship game.
* Viewership figures for simulcast

==== Non-CFP bowl games ====
Several bowl name changes were made, as compared to the prior season's bowl games:

- Due to construction at its normal stadium, the Bahamas Bowl was temporarily relocated to North Carolina and branded as the Famous Toastery Bowl per its title sponsor.
- Due to a change in title sponsor, the LendingTree Bowl was renamed as the 68 Ventures Bowl.
- Sponsor Kellogg's (renamed Kellanova in October 2023, after the company's North American cereal business was spun off as the WK Kellogg Co) renamed the Cheez-It Bowl as the Pop-Tarts Bowl.

Rankings are per the final CFP rankings that were released on December 3.

Date	Time (EST)	Game	Site	Teams	Affiliations	Results	Attendance	Television	
Date	Time (EST)	Game	Site	Teams	Affiliations	Results	Attendance	Network	U.S. viewers (millions)
Dec. 16	11:00 a.m.	Myrtle Beach Bowl	Brooks Stadium; Conway, South Carolina	Ohio Bobcats (9–3); Georgia Southern Eagles (6–6)	MAC; Sun Belt	Ohio 41; Georgia Southern 21	8,059	ESPN	1.20
Dec. 16	2:15 p.m.	New Orleans Bowl	Caesars Superdome; New Orleans, Louisiana	Jacksonville State Gamecocks (8–4); Louisiana Ragin' Cajuns (6–6)	C–USA; Sun Belt	Jacksonville State 34; Louisiana 31 (OT)	14,485	ESPN	1.08
Dec. 16	3:30 p.m.	Cure Bowl	FBC Mortgage Stadium; Orlando, Florida	Appalachian State Mountaineers (8–5); Miami (OH) RedHawks (11–2)	Sun Belt; MAC	Appalachian State 13; Miami (OH) 9	11,121	ABC	—
Dec. 16	5:45 p.m.	New Mexico Bowl	University Stadium; Albuquerque, New Mexico	Fresno State Bulldogs (8–4); New Mexico State Aggies (10–4)	MW; C–USA	Fresno State 37; New Mexico State 10	30,822	ESPN	0.84
Dec. 16	7:30 p.m.	LA Bowl	SoFi Stadium; Inglewood, California	UCLA Bruins (7–5); Boise State Broncos (8–5)	Pac-12; MW	UCLA 35; Boise State 22	32,780	ABC	2.38
Dec. 16	9:15 p.m.	Independence Bowl	Independence Stadium; Shreveport, Louisiana	Texas Tech Red Raiders (6–6); California Golden Bears (6–6)	Big 12; Pac-12	Texas Tech 34; California 14	33,071	ESPN	1.02
Dec. 18	2:30 p.m.	Famous Toastery Bowl	Jerry Richardson Stadium; Charlotte, North Carolina	Western Kentucky Hilltoppers (7–5); Old Dominion Monarchs (6–6)	C–USA; Sun Belt	Western Kentucky 38; Old Dominion 35 (OT)	5,632	ESPN	0.92
Dec. 19	9:00 p.m.	Frisco Bowl	Toyota Stadium; Frisco, Texas	UTSA Roadrunners (8–4); Marshall Thundering Herd (6–6)	American; Sun Belt	UTSA 35; Marshall 17	11,215	ESPN	0.99
Dec. 21	8:00 p.m.	Boca Raton Bowl	FAU Stadium; Boca Raton, Florida	South Florida Bulls (6–6); Syracuse Orange (6–6)	American; ACC	South Florida 45; Syracuse 0	20,711	ESPN	1.05
Dec. 22	6:30 p.m.	Gasparilla Bowl	Raymond James Stadium; Tampa, Florida	Georgia Tech Yellow Jackets (6–6); UCF Knights (6–6)	ACC; Big 12	Georgia Tech 30; UCF 17	30,281	ESPN	2.35
Dec. 23	12:00 p.m.	Birmingham Bowl	Protective Stadium; Birmingham, Alabama	Duke Blue Devils (7–5); Troy Trojans (11–2)	ACC; Sun Belt	Duke 17; Troy 10	20,023	ABC	—
Dec. 23	12:00 p.m.	Camellia Bowl	Cramton Bowl; Montgomery, Alabama	Northern Illinois Huskies (6–6); Arkansas State Red Wolves (6–6)	MAC; Sun Belt	Northern Illinois 21; Arkansas State 19	11,310	ESPN	1.57
Dec. 23	3:30 p.m.	Armed Forces Bowl	Amon G. Carter Stadium; Fort Worth, Texas	Air Force Falcons (8–4); James Madison Dukes (11–1)	MW; Sun Belt	Air Force 31; James Madison 21	30,828	ABC	—
Dec. 23	3:30 p.m.	Famous Idaho Potato Bowl	Albertsons Stadium; Boise, Idaho	Georgia State Panthers (6–6); Utah State Aggies (6–6)	Sun Belt; MW	Georgia State 45; Utah State 22	12,168	ESPN	1.15
Dec. 23	7:00 p.m.	68 Ventures Bowl	Hancock Whitney Stadium; Mobile, Alabama	South Alabama Jaguars (6–6); Eastern Michigan Eagles (6–6)	Sun Belt; MAC	South Alabama 59; Eastern Michigan 10	20,926	ESPN	0.76
Dec. 23	7:30 p.m.	Las Vegas Bowl	Allegiant Stadium; Paradise, Nevada	Northwestern Wildcats (7–5); Utah Utes (8–4)	Big Ten; Pac-12	Northwestern 14; Utah 7	20,897	ABC	—
Dec. 23	10:30 p.m.	Hawaii Bowl	Clarence T. C. Ching Athletics Complex; Honolulu, Hawaii	Coastal Carolina Chanticleers (7–5); San Jose State Spartans (7–5)	Sun Belt; MW	Coastal Carolina 24; San Jose State 14	7,089	ESPN	0.95
Dec. 26	2:00 p.m.	Quick Lane Bowl	Ford Field; Detroit, Michigan	Minnesota Golden Gophers (5–7); Bowling Green Falcons (7–5)	Big Ten; MAC	Minnesota 30; Bowling Green 24	28,521	ESPN	2.22
Dec. 26	5:30 p.m.	First Responder Bowl	Gerald J. Ford Stadium; University Park, Texas	Texas State Bobcats (7–5); Rice Owls (6–6)	Sun Belt; American	Texas State 45; Rice 21	26,542	ESPN	2.80
Dec. 26	9:00 p.m.	Guaranteed Rate Bowl	Chase Field; Phoenix, Arizona	Kansas Jayhawks (8–4); UNLV Rebels (9–4)	Big 12; MW	Kansas 49; UNLV 36	26,478	ESPN	2.69
Dec. 27	2:00 p.m.	Military Bowl	Navy–Marine Corps Memorial Stadium; Annapolis, Maryland	Virginia Tech Hokies (6–6); Tulane Green Wave (11–2)	ACC; American	Virginia Tech 41; Tulane 20	35,849	ESPN	2.26
Dec. 27	5:30 p.m.	Duke's Mayo Bowl	Bank of America Stadium; Charlotte, North Carolina	West Virginia Mountaineers (8–4); North Carolina Tar Heels (8–4)	Big 12; ACC	West Virginia 30; North Carolina 10	42,925	ESPN	3.84
Dec. 27	8:00 p.m.	Holiday Bowl	Petco Park; San Diego, California	USC Trojans (7–5); No. 15 Louisville Cardinals (10–3)	Pac-12; ACC	USC 42; Louisville 28	35,317	Fox	—
Dec. 27	9:00 p.m.	Texas Bowl	NRG Stadium; Houston, Texas	No. 20 Oklahoma State Cowboys (9–4); Texas A&M Aggies (7–5)	Big 12; SEC	Oklahoma State 31; Texas A&M 23	55,212	ESPN	3.07
Dec. 28	11:00 a.m.	Fenway Bowl	Fenway Park; Boston, Massachusetts	Boston College Eagles (6–6); No. 24 SMU Mustangs (11–2)	ACC; American	Boston College 23; SMU 14	16,238	ESPN	1.46
Dec. 28	2:15 p.m.	Pinstripe Bowl	Yankee Stadium; The Bronx, New York	Rutgers Scarlet Knights (6–6); Miami (FL) Hurricanes (7–5)	Big Ten; ACC	Rutgers 31; Miami (FL) 24	35,314	ESPN	3.00
Dec. 28	5:45 p.m.	Pop-Tarts Bowl	Camping World Stadium; Orlando, Florida	No. 25 Kansas State Wildcats (8–4); No. 18 NC State Wolfpack (9–3)	Big 12; ACC	Kansas State 28; NC State 19	31,111	ESPN	4.31
Dec. 28	9:15 p.m.	Alamo Bowl	Alamodome; San Antonio, Texas	No. 14 Arizona Wildcats (9–3); No. 12 Oklahoma Sooners (10–2)	Pac-12; Big 12	Arizona 38; Oklahoma 24	55,853	ESPN	3.93
Dec. 29	12:00 p.m.	Gator Bowl	EverBank Stadium; Jacksonville, Florida	No. 22 Clemson Tigers (8–4); Kentucky Wildcats (7–5)	ACC; SEC	Clemson 38; Kentucky 35	40,132	ESPN	3.43
Dec. 29	2:00 p.m.	Sun Bowl	Sun Bowl; El Paso, Texas	No. 16 Notre Dame Fighting Irish (9–3); No. 19 Oregon State Beavers (8–4)	Independent; Pac-12	Notre Dame 40; Oregon State 8	48,223	CBS	—
Dec. 29	3:30 p.m.	Liberty Bowl	Simmons Bank Liberty Stadium; Memphis, Tennessee	Memphis Tigers (9–3); Iowa State Cyclones (7–5)	American; Big 12	Memphis 36; Iowa State 26	48,789	ESPN	3.59
Dec. 30	2:00 p.m.	Music City Bowl	Nissan Stadium; Nashville, Tennessee	Maryland Terrapins (7–5); Auburn Tigers (6–6)	Big Ten; SEC	Maryland 31; Auburn 13	50,088	ABC	—
Dec. 30	4:30 p.m.	Arizona Bowl	Arizona Stadium; Tucson, Arizona	Wyoming Cowboys (8–4); Toledo Rockets (11–2)	MW; MAC	Wyoming 16; Toledo 15	30,428	Barstool/ The CW	—
Jan. 1	12:00 p.m.	ReliaQuest Bowl	Raymond James Stadium; Tampa, Florida	No. 13 LSU Tigers (9–3); Wisconsin Badgers (7–5)	SEC; Big Ten	LSU 35; Wisconsin 31	31,424	ESPN2	4.61
Jan. 1	1:00 p.m.	Citrus Bowl	Camping World Stadium; Orlando, Florida	No. 21 Tennessee Volunteers (8–4); No. 17 Iowa Hawkeyes (10–3)	SEC; Big Ten	Tennessee 35; Iowa 0	43,861	ABC	—

=== Division I FCS bowl game ===
Locations of 2023 Non-DI FBS bowls.
– DI FCS, – DII, – DIII

The Football Championship Subdivision (FCS) has one bowl game, played between HBCUs, which acts as a de facto Black college football national championship. The FCS also has a postseason bracket tournament that culminates in the 2024 NCAA Division I Football Championship Game.

Date	Time (EST)	Game	Site	Television	Teams	Affiliations	Results
Dec. 16	12:00 p.m.	Celebration Bowl	Mercedes-Benz Stadium; Atlanta, Georgia	USA: ABC; Canada: TSN2	Florida A&M (11–1); Howard (6–5)	SWAC; MEAC	Florida A&M 30; Howard 26

=== Division II bowl games ===
There were four bowl games, which featured teams that did not qualify for the Division II postseason tournament.

The schedule included the inaugural edition of the Florida Beach Bowl, contested between teams from the Southern Intercollegiate Athletic Conference (SIAC) and Central Intercollegiate Athletic Association (CIAA), two conferences mostly consisting of historically black colleges and universities (HBCUs).

Date	Time (EST)	Game	Site	Television	Teams	Affiliations	Results
Dec. 1	7:00 p.m.	America's Crossroads Bowl	Hammond Central High School; Hammond, Indiana	No broadcast	McKendree (5–5); Ashland (8–3)	GLVC; GMAC	Ashland 23; McKendree 20
Dec. 2	1:00 p.m.	Live United Bowl	Arkansas High School; Texarkana, Arkansas	No broadcast	Southern Arkansas (9–2); Missouri Western (8–3)	GAC; MIAA	Southern Arkansas 43; Missouri Western 27
Dec. 2	1:00 p.m.	Heritage Bowl	Tiger Stadium; Corsicana, Texas	No broadcast	Southern Nazarene (6–5); Emporia State (8–3)	GAC; MIAA	Emporia State 55; Southern Nazarene 24
Dec. 13	7:30 p.m.	Florida Beach Bowl	DRV PNK Stadium; Fort Lauderdale, Florida	HBCU Go	Johnson C. Smith (7–3); Fort Valley State (7–3)	CIAA; SIAC	Fort Valley State 23; Johnson C. Smith 10

=== Division III bowl games ===
Division III had 13 bowl games, featuring teams that did not qualify for the Division III postseason tournament.

Date	Time (EST)	Game	Site	Television	Teams	Affiliations	Results
Nov. 18	11:00 a.m.	Centennial-MAC Bowl Series	Campus sites		Franklin & Marshall (7–3); King's (PA) (8–2)	Centennial; MAC	Franklin & Marshall 30; King's (PA) 7
Nov. 18	12:00 p.m.	Centennial-MAC Bowl Series	Campus sites		Muhlenberg (9–1); Lebanon Valley (6–4)	Centennial; MAC	Muhlenberg 23; Lebanon Valley 7
Nov. 18	12:00 p.m.	Whitelaw Bowl	Campus sites		RPI (7–3); Widener (7–3)	Liberty; MAC	RPI 49; Widener 21
Nov. 18	12:00 p.m.	Lynah Bowl	Campus sites		Washington & Jefferson (8–2); Merchant Marine (7–2)	PAC; NEWMAC	Washington & Jefferson 46; Merchant Marine 21
Nov. 18	12:00 p.m.	New England Bowl	Campus sites		Salve Regina (8–2); Anna Maria (5–4)	NEWMAC; ECFC	Salve Regina 37; Anna Maria 34
Nov. 18	12:00 p.m.	New England Bowl	Campus sites		Western New England (7–3); UMass Dartmouth (9–1)	CCC; MASCAC	Western New England 37; UMass Dartmouth 7
Nov. 18	12:00 p.m.	Cape Henry Bowl	Campus sites		Wilkes (4–6); Bridgewater (7–3)	Landmark; ODAC	Wilkes 35; Bridgewater 17
Nov. 18	12:00 p.m.	Cape Charles Bowl	Campus sites		Lycoming (4–6); Washington & Lee (8–2)	Landmark; ODAC	Lycoming 20; Washington & Lee 17
Nov. 18	12:00 p.m.	Lakefront Bowl	Raabe Stadium; Wauwatosa, Wisconsin		Monmouth (IL) (8–2); St. Norbert (7–3)	MWC; NACC	Monmouth (IL) 21; St. Norbert 14
Nov. 18	1:00 p.m.	Chapman Bowl	Campus sites		Utica (8–2); Hobart (8–2)	Empire 8 Liberty	Utica 10; Hobart 6
Nov. 18	2:00 p.m.	Centennial-MAC Bowl Series	Campus sites		Ursinus (7–3); Stevenson (7–3)	Centennial; MAC	Ursinus 31; Stevenson 13
Nov. 18	3:00 p.m.	Isthmus Bowl	Bank of Sun Prairie Stadium; Sun Prairie, Wisconsin		Wisconsin–Platteville (6–4); Augustana (IL) (8–2)	WIAC; CCIW	Wisconsin–Platteville 36; Augustana (IL) 10
Nov. 18	5:00 p.m.	Bushnell Bowl	Campus sites		Carnegie Mellon (9–1); Brockport (8–2)	PAC; Empire 8	Carnegie Mellon 37; Brockport 7

=== All-star games ===
Each of these games featured college seniors, or players whose college football eligibility was ending, who were individually invited by game organizers. These games were scheduled to follow the team-competitive bowls, to allow players selected from bowl teams to participate. Such all-star games may include some players from non-FBS programs.

The NFLPA Collegiate Bowl, which debuted in 2012 and was played 12 times through January 2023, was discontinued. The East–West Shrine Bowl relocated from Nevada (where its prior two editions had been played) to Texas.

Date	Time (EST)	Game	Site	Television	Participants	Results	Ref.	U.S Viewers (Millions)
Jan. 13	12:00 p.m.	Hula Bowl	FBC Mortgage Stadium; Orlando, Florida	CBS Sports Network	Team Kai; Team Aina	Kai 24; Aina 17		
Jan. 20	12:00 p.m.	Tropical Bowl	Municipal Stadium; Daytona Beach, Florida	Varsity Sports Network	American Team; National Team	American 17; National 17		
Feb. 1	8:00 p.m.	East-West Shrine Bowl	Ford Center at The Star; Frisco, Texas	NFL Network	West Team; East Team	West 26; East 11		0.22
Feb. 3	1:00 p.m.	Senior Bowl	Hancock Whitney Stadium; Mobile, Alabama	NFL Network	National Team; American Team	National 16; American 7		0.55
Feb. 24	4:00 p.m.	HBCU Legacy Bowl	Yulman Stadium; New Orleans, Louisiana	NFL Network	Team Gaither; Team Robinson	Gaither 10; Robinson 6		0.07

The HBCU Legacy Bowl features players from historically black colleges and universities (HBCU). Most HBCU football programs compete in the Mid-Eastern Athletic Conference (MEAC) or the Southwestern Athletic Conference (SWAC), which are part of FCS.

== Team selections ==
=== CFP top 25 standings and bowl games ===
The College Football Playoff (CFP) selection committee announced its final team rankings for the season on December 3, 2023. It was the 10th season of the CFP era, and the last one with a four-team playoff. This was the first time that an undefeated Power Five conference champion (Florida State) was left out of the semifinals.

Rank	Team	W–L	Conference and standing	Bowl game
1	Michigan Wolverines	13–0	Big Ten champions	Rose Bowl (CFB playoff semifinal)
2	Washington Huskies	13–0	Pac-12 champions	Sugar Bowl (CFB playoff semifinal)
3	Texas Longhorns	12–1	Big 12 champions	Sugar Bowl (CFB playoff semifinal)
4	Alabama Crimson Tide	12–1	SEC champions	Rose Bowl (CFB playoff semifinal)
5	Florida State Seminoles	13–0	ACC champions	Orange Bowl (NY6)
6	Georgia Bulldogs	12–1	SEC East Division champions	Orange Bowl (NY6)
7	Ohio State Buckeyes	11–1	Big Ten East Division second place	Cotton Bowl (NY6)
8	Oregon Ducks	11–2	Pac-12 second place	Fiesta Bowl (NY6)
9	Missouri Tigers	10–2	SEC East Division second place	Cotton Bowl (NY6)
10	Penn State Nittany Lions	10–2	Big Ten East Division third place	Peach Bowl (NY6)
11	Ole Miss Rebels	10–2	SEC West Division second place (tie)	Peach Bowl (NY6)
12	Oklahoma Sooners	10–2	Big 12 second place (tie)	Alamo Bowl
13	LSU Tigers	9–3	SEC West Division second place (tie)	ReliaQuest Bowl
14	Arizona Wildcats	9–3	Pac-12 third place	Alamo Bowl
15	Louisville Cardinals	10–3	ACC second place	Holiday Bowl
16	Notre Dame Fighting Irish	9–3	Independent	Sun Bowl
17	Iowa Hawkeyes	10–3	Big Ten West Division champions	Citrus Bowl
18	NC State Wolfpack	9–3	ACC third place	Pop-Tarts Bowl
19	Oregon State Beavers	8–4	Pac-12 fourth place (tie)	Sun Bowl
20	Oklahoma State Cowboys	9–4	Big 12 second place (tie)	Texas Bowl
21	Tennessee Volunteers	8–4	SEC East Division third place	Citrus Bowl
22	Clemson Tigers	8–4	ACC sixth place (tie)	Gator Bowl
23	Liberty Flames	13–0	C–USA champions	Fiesta Bowl (NY6)
24	SMU Mustangs	11–2	AAC champions	Fenway Bowl
25	Kansas State Wildcats	8–4	Big 12 fourth place (tie)	Pop-Tarts Bowl

=== Bowl-eligible teams ===
Generally, a team must have at least six wins to be considered bowl eligible, with at least five of those wins being against FBS opponents. The College Football Playoff semifinal games are determined based on the top four seeds in the playoff committee's final rankings. The remainder of the bowl-eligible teams are selected by each respective bowl based on conference tie-ins, order of selection, matchup considerations, and other factors.

- ACC (11): Boston College, Clemson, Duke, Florida State, Georgia Tech, Louisville, Miami (FL), NC State, North Carolina, Syracuse, Virginia Tech
- American (6): Memphis, Rice, SMU, South Florida, Tulane, UTSA
- Big Ten (9): Iowa, Maryland, Michigan, Minnesota, (Note: Despite having a 5–7 record, Minnesota became bowl eligible due to having the highest Academic Progress Rate among five-win teams.) Northwestern, Ohio State, Penn State, Rutgers, Wisconsin
- Big 12 (9): Iowa State, Kansas, Kansas State, Oklahoma, Oklahoma State, Texas, Texas Tech, UCF, West Virginia
- C–USA (4): Jacksonville State, (Note: As there were not enough otherwise bowl-eligible teams to fill available spots, Jacksonville State and James Madison became conditionally bowl eligible due to their winning records, despite their transitions from FCS.) Liberty, New Mexico State, Western Kentucky
- MAC (6): Bowling Green, Eastern Michigan, Miami (OH), Northern Illinois, Ohio, Toledo
- Mountain West (7): Air Force, Boise State, Fresno State, San Jose State, UNLV, Utah State, Wyoming
- Pac-12 (8): Arizona, California, Oregon, Oregon State, UCLA, USC, Utah, Washington
- SEC (9): Alabama, Auburn, Georgia, Kentucky, LSU, Missouri, Ole Miss, Tennessee, Texas A&M
- Sun Belt (12): Appalachian State, Arkansas State, Coastal Carolina, Georgia Southern, Georgia State, James Madison, Louisiana, Marshall, Old Dominion, South Alabama, Texas State, Troy
- Independent (1): Notre Dame

Number of bowl berths available: 82
Number of bowl-eligible teams: 79
Number of conditionally bowl-eligible teams: 2: (Jacksonville State and James Madison)
Number of teams qualified by APR: 1 (Minnesota)

=== Bowl-ineligible teams ===
- ACC (3): Pittsburgh, Virginia, Wake Forest
- American (8): Charlotte, East Carolina, Florida Atlantic, Navy, North Texas, Temple, Tulsa, UAB
- Big Ten (5): Illinois, Indiana, Michigan State, Nebraska, Purdue
- Big 12 (5): Baylor, BYU, Cincinnati, Houston, TCU
- C–USA (5): FIU, Louisiana Tech, Middle Tennessee, Sam Houston, (Note: Sam Houston was bowl ineligible due to their transition from FCS to FBS, and the Bearkats would have been bowl ineligible regardless, as they finished with a 3–9 record.) UTEP
- MAC (6): Akron, Ball State, Buffalo, Central Michigan, Kent State, Western Michigan
- Mountain West (5): Colorado State, Hawaii, Nevada, New Mexico, San Diego State
- Pac-12 (4): Arizona State, (Note: Arizona State self-imposed a bowl ban due to recruiting violations that occurred in 2020. The Sun Devils would have been bowl ineligible regardless, as they finished with a 3–9 record.) Colorado, Stanford, Washington State
- SEC (5): Arkansas, Florida, Mississippi State, South Carolina, Vanderbilt
- Sun Belt (2): Louisiana–Monroe, Southern Miss
- Independent (3): Army, (Note: Despite finishing at 6–6, Army only had five wins at the time bowl matchups were determined; additionally, two of their wins were against FCS teams.) UConn, UMass

Number of bowl-ineligible teams: 51

== Conference summaries ==
=== Conference champions' bowl games ===
Ranks are per the final CFP rankings, released on December 3, 2023, with win–loss records at that time.

Conference	Champion	W–L	Rank	Bowl game
American	SMU	11–2	24	Fenway Bowl
ACC	Florida State	13–0	5	Orange Bowl
Big Ten	Michigan^{CFP}	13–0	1	Rose Bowl
Big 12	Texas^{CFP}	12–1	3	Sugar Bowl
C–USA	Liberty	13–0	23	Fiesta Bowl
MAC	Miami (OH)	11–2	–	Cure Bowl
Mountain West	Boise State	8–5	–	LA Bowl
Pac-12	Washington^{CFP}	13–0	2	Sugar Bowl
SEC	Alabama^{CFP}	12–1	4	Rose Bowl
Sun Belt	Troy	11–2	–	Birmingham Bowl

^{CFP} College Football Playoff participant

=== Conference performance in bowl games ===
Division I FBS
Conference	Games	Record			Bowls	
Conference	Games	W	L	Pct.	Won	Lost
ACC	11	5	6	.455	Gasparilla, Birmingham, Military, Fenway, Gator	Boca Raton, Duke's Mayo, Holiday, Pinstripe; Pop-Tarts, Orange
American	6	3	3	.500	Frisco, Boca Raton, Liberty	First Responder, Military, Fenway
Big 12	9	5	4	.556	Independence, Guaranteed Rate, Duke's Mayo; Texas, Pop-Tarts	Gasparilla, Alamo, Liberty, Sugar
Big Ten	10	6	4	.600	Las Vegas, Quick Lane, Pinstripe, Music City, Rose, Championship	Cotton, Peach, ReliaQuest, Citrus
C-USA	4	2	2	.500	New Orleans, Famous Toastery	New Mexico, Fiesta
MAC	6	2	4	.333	Myrtle Beach, Camellia	Cure, 68 Ventures, Quick Lane, Arizona
Mountain West	7	3	4	.429	New Mexico, Armed Forces, Arizona	LA, Famous Idaho Potato, Hawaii, Guaranteed Rate
Pac-12	9	5	4	.556	LA, Holiday, Alamo, Fiesta, Sugar	Independence, Las Vegas, Sun, Championship
SEC	9	5	4	.556	Cotton, Peach, Orange, ReliaQuest, Citrus	Texas, Gator, Music City, Rose
Sun Belt	12	5	7	.417	Cure, Famous Idaho Potato, 68 Ventures, Hawaii, First Responder	Myrtle Beach, New Orleans, Famous Toastery, Frisco, Birmingham, Camellia, Armed Forces
Independent	1	1	0	1.000	Sun	—

Note: The only independent team that played in an FBS bowl game was Notre Dame.
