= North Gwinnett High School =

Public high school in Suwanee, Georgia, United States

Location
- 20 Level Creek Rd. Suwanee, Georgia 30024; United States; 34°05′08″N 84°04′16″W

Information
- Established: 1958; 68 years ago
- School board: Gwinnett County Board of Education
- School district: Gwinnett County Public Schools
- Superintendent: Al Taylor
- NCES School ID: 130255001123
- Principal: Nathan Ballentine
- Teaching staff: 166.80 (FTE)
- Grades: 9–12
- Enrollment: 3,033 (2024–2025)
- Average class size: 30
- Student to teacher ratio: 18.18
- Colors: Red, black, and white
- Mascot: Bulldogs
- Rivals: Norcross Blue Devils; Collins Hill Eagles; Peachtree Ridge Lions; Mill Creek Hawks
- Newspaper: The Red & Black
- Website: northgwinnetths.gcpsk12.org

North Gwinnett High School is a public high school in Suwanee, Georgia, United States. It is part of the district Gwinnett County Public Schools. The school's principal is Nathan Ballantine.

== History ==
North Gwinnett High School was established in 1958. It was built in a former cotton field between the communities of Suwanee and Sugar Hill for the purpose of consolidating the two communities' separate high schools, Suwanee High School and Sugar Hill High School. The land for the school was donated by the estate of Tom Robinson, for whom the NGHS football field is named.

In its early years, NGHS was a small school. In 1960, the school served grades 8 through 12 and there were 328 students enrolled. The eighth grade was eliminated after a new middle school was built during the 1973–1974 school year. By that year, NGHS had 606 students. The school grew dramatically in subsequent decades. Enrollment reached 1,000 for the first time in the 1988–1989 school year and has reached over 2,800. For the 2011–2012 school year, enrollment was 2,670. As of 2018–2019, enrollment is reported as 2,846 students.

North Gwinnett High School figured in Franklin v. Gwinnett County Public Schools, 503 U.S. 60 (1992), a U.S. Supreme Court case that was decided in 1992. A female student at the school accused a teacher of sexual harassment and sued the school district for monetary damages for not stopping the harassment after she complained to school authorities. The federal district court ruled that Title IX of the Education Amendments of 1972, under which she sued, did not allow for monetary damages. The appeals court affirmed that ruling, but the Supreme Court overturned that decision. The Supreme Court found that Title IX does allow for monetary damages, thus returning the student's case to lower courts.

== Awards ==
In 2009, North Gwinnett High School received the silver award for the Single Statewide Accountability System. In 2010, the Department of Education named the school as one of the Advanced Placement Honors Schools.

== Student activities ==
=== Clubs and Sports ===
School activities include athletics, clubs, and leadership groups such as the NGHS Beta Society, Student Council, Robotics, Quiz Bowl, HOSA, TSA, Deca, FBLA, and Relay for Life. The school's football team won the 2017 State Championship Class AAAAAAA. The women's varsity soccer team won the 2019 State Championship Class AAAAAAA.

== Notable alumni ==
- Charlie Blackmon, MLB player
- Tiffany Blackmon, sportscaster
- Ed Bolian – Unsanctioned 1970s automobile race
- Lexie Brown, WNBA player
- Ahmad Caver (born 1996), professional basketball player
- Corey Collins, professional baseball player
- Jared Cook, NFL player
- Josh Downs, NFL player
- Tyler Goodson, NFL player
- Jordan Hancock, NFL player
- Mitch Hyatt, NFL player
- Josh Imatorbhebhe, NFL player
- Jared Ivey, NFL player
- Ja'Wuan James, NFL player
- Kibwé Johnson, Olympic athlete (hammer throw)
- Noah Lomax, Actor
- Kayden McDonald, college football player
- Robert Nelson, NFL player
- Quinton Newsome, NFL player
- Anree Saint-Amour, NFL and UFL player
- Austin Shepherd, NFL player
- CJ Uzomah, NFL player
- Blake Wood, MLB player
