= 2023 Ole Miss Rebels football team =

American college football season

2023 Ole Miss Rebels football

Peach Bowl champion

Peach Bowl, W 38–25 vs. Penn State
- Conference: Southeastern Conference
- Western Division

Ranking
- Coaches: No. 9
- AP: No. 9
- Record: 11–2 (6–2 SEC)
- Head coach: Lane Kiffin (4th season)
- Co-offensive coordinators: John David Baker (2nd season); Charlie Weis Jr. (2nd season)
- Offensive scheme: Veer and shoot
- Defensive coordinator: Pete Golding (1st season)
- Base defense: 3–4
- Home stadium: Vaught–Hemingway Stadium

Uniform
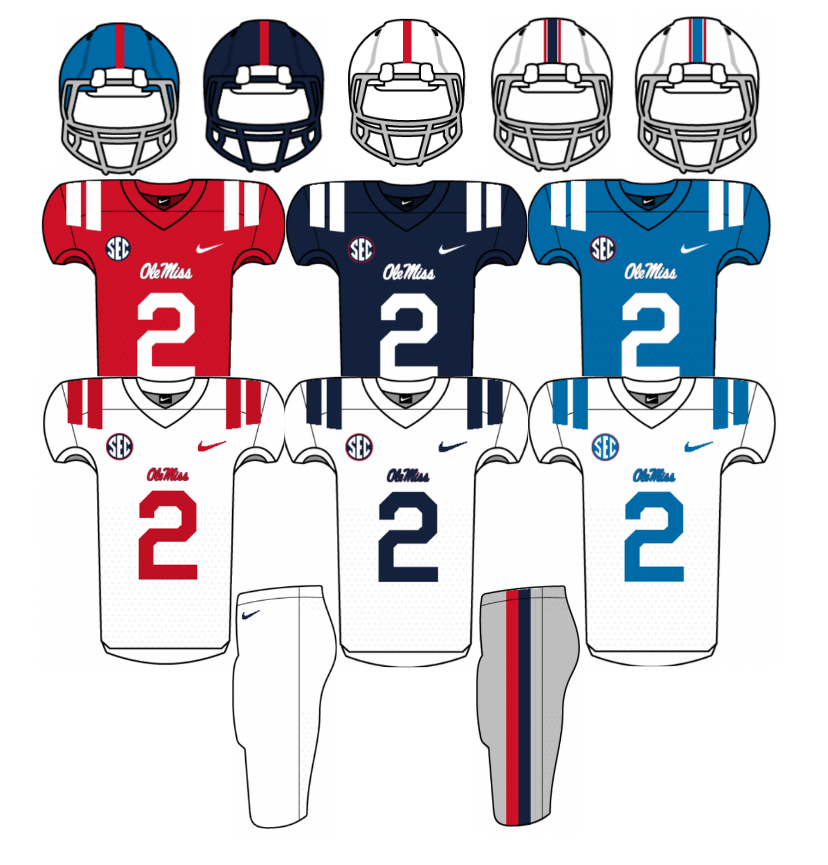

2023 Southeastern Conference football standings
	Conf.			Overall
Team	W		L	W		L
Eastern Division
No. 4 Georgia xy	8	–	0	13	–	1
No. 8 Missouri	6	–	2	11	–	2
No. 17 Tennessee	4	–	4	9	–	4
Kentucky	3	–	5	7	–	6
Florida	3	–	5	5	–	7
South Carolina	3	–	5	5	–	7
Vanderbilt	0	–	8	2	–	10
Western Division
No. 5 Alabama xy$^	8	–	0	12	–	2
No. 9 Ole Miss	6	–	2	11	–	2
No. 12 LSU	6	–	2	10	–	3
Texas A&M	4	–	4	7	–	6
Auburn	3	–	5	6	–	7
Mississippi State	1	–	7	5	–	7
Arkansas	1	–	7	4	–	8
Championship: Alabama 27, Georgia 24
^ – College Football Playoff participant; $ – Conference champion; x – Division champion/co-champions; y – Championship game participant; Rankings from AP Poll

The 2023 Ole Miss Rebels football team represented the University of Mississippi in the Western Division of the Southeastern Conference (SEC) during the 2023 NCAA Division I FBS football season. The Rebels were led by Lane Kiffin in his fourth season as their head coach.

The Ole Miss football team played their home games at Vaught–Hemingway Stadium in Oxford, Mississippi. This was the final year for the SEC West and East divisions, as the University of Texas and the University of Oklahoma joined the SEC from the Big 12 in 2024, and the SEC's divisional format was done away with, making the SEC Conference a 16-team battle in 2024.

The Rebels were predicted to finish 4th in the SEC West behind Alabama, LSU, and Texas A&M. They started out 3–0 with a win over #23 Tulane on the road, but suffered their first loss to the Alabama Crimson Tide by a score of 24–10. They rebounded by defeating their arch-rival #13 LSU 55–49 in front of 66,703 (the then-largest crowd to ever watch a football game in the state of Mississippi).

The Rebels eventually won every subsequent game in the month of October and reached an 8–1 record and a #9 ranking in the first College Football Playoff rankings. This led to a Top 10 showdown with #2 Georgia, the two-time defending national champion, in Athens. ESPN's College GameDay broadcast their show on the University of Georgia's campus. The Rebels would lose 52–17; this would be the 2nd and final loss of the season for the team.

Wins over ULM and arch-rival Mississippi State in the Egg Bowl allowed the Rebels to claim another 10-win regular season, just the second in their history after the 2021 season. While it looked as though the Rebels would unfortunately get left out of a New Year's Six bowl and would be sent to the Citrus Bowl, they did receive a New Year's Six bowl berth after Alabama was selected to be in the College Football Playoff over Florida State (which sent the undefeated Seminoles to the Orange Bowl and thus opened up a spot in a New Year’s Six bowl for Ole Miss). The Rebels would be selected to play Penn State in the Chick-fil-a Peach Bowl. Despite being 5.5 point underdogs, Ole Miss won 38–25 in front of 71,230 fans from both teams, which was the 2nd-largest attendance of any bowl in the 2023 season following the Rose Bowl (96,371).

Following their win in the Peach Bowl against Penn State, the Rebels achieved their first 11-win season in program history. It was also the first time in 52 years that the Rebels finished a season with two-or-fewer losses.

== Offseason ==
=== NFL draft ===
Four Rebels were selected in the 2023 NFL Draft.

Player	Position	Team	Round	Pick
Jonathan Mingo	WR	Carolina Panthers	2	39
Tavius Robinson	LB	Baltimore Ravens	4	124
Zach Evans	RB	Los Angeles Rams	6	215
Nick Broeker	OG	Buffalo Bills	7	230

=== Transfers ===
==== Outgoing ====
Player	Position	Destination
Luke Altmyer	QB	Illinois
Miles Battle	DB	Utah
Derek Bermudez	DB	Fullerton College
Tobias Braun	OT	Arkansas State
Kyndrich Breedlove	DB	Colorado
Markevious Brown	DB	Purdue
Brandon Buckhaulter	WR	UAB
Kentrel Bullock	RB	South Alabama
Erick Cade	OT	Missouri State
Falentha Carswell	OT	Memphis
Demon Clowney	DE	Charlotte
Jalen Cunningham	DL	Arkansas State
MJ Daniels	S	Southern Miss
Kinkead Dent	QB	UT Martin
Hamilton Hall	OT	Arkansas State
JJ Hawkins	DL	Colorado
Davison Igbinosun	DB	Ohio State
Isaiah Iton	DL	Rutgers
Dannis Jackson	WR	Missouri
Dashaun Jerkins	S	UMass
Tysheem Johnson	S	Oregon
Casey Kelly	TE	Oregon
Austin Keys	LB	Auburn
Danny Lockhart	LB	Texas A&M
Brandon Mack	DE	Houston
Tywone Malone	DL	Ohio State
Braxton Myers	S	Purdue
Roman Rashada	DB	Arizona State
Jaylon Robinson	WR	TCU
Elijah Sabbatini	S	Southern Miss
Luke Shouse	DL	Tennessee
Jaron Willis	DE	South Carolina
Isaiah Woullard	RB	Louisiana–Monroe

==== Incoming ====
Player	Position	Previous School
Daijahn Anthony	S	Liberty
Jadon Canady	DB	Tulane
Victor Curne	OL	Washington
Caden Davis	K	Texas A&M
TJ Dudley	LB	Clemson
Zakhari Franklin	WR	UTSA
DeShawn Gaddie	DB	North Texas
Chris Graves	DB	Miami (FL)
Jam Griffin	RB	Oregon State
Joshua Harris	DL	NC State
Tre Harris	WR	Louisiana Tech
Walker Howard	QB	LSU
Jeremiah Jean-Baptiste	LB	UCF
Monty Montgomery	LB	Louisville
Caden Prieskorn	TE	Memphis
Spencer Sanders	QB	Oklahoma State
John Saunders	DB	Miami (OH)
Akelo Stone	DL	Georgia Tech
Isaac Ukwu	DE	James Madison
Zamari Walton	DB	Georgia Tech
Stephon Wynn	DL	Nebraska
Teja Young	S	Florida Atlantic

== Preseason ==
=== SEC Media Poll ===
The 2023 SEC media poll was released on July 21, 2023. The Rebels were predicted to finish fourth in the Western Division.

== Schedule ==
Ole Miss and the SEC announced the 2023 football schedule on September 20, 2022. The 2023 Rebels' schedule consisted of 7 home games and 5 away games for the regular season. Ole Miss hosted four SEC conference opponents Arkansas (rivalry), LSU (Magnolia Bowl), Texas A&M and Vanderbilt (rivalry) at home and traveled to four SEC opponents, Alabama (rivalry), Auburn (rivalry), Georgia and Mississippi State (Egg Bowl) to close out the SEC regular season on the road. Ole Miss was not scheduled to play SEC East opponents Florida, Kentucky, Missouri, South Carolina and Tennessee in the 2023 regular season. The Rebel's bye week came during week 7 (on October 14, 2023).

Ole Miss's out of conference opponents represented the American, ACC, SoCon and the Sun Belt conferences. The Rebels hosted three non–conference games which were against Georgia Tech from the ACC, Louisiana–Monroe from the Sun Belt and Mercer from the SoCon (FCS) and traveled to rival Tulane from the American.

Date	Time	Opponent	Rank	Site	TV	Result	Attendance
September 2	1:00 p.m.	No. 20 (FCS) Mercer*	No. 22	Vaught–Hemingway Stadium; Oxford, MS	ESPN+/SECN+	W 73–7	60,097
September 9	2:30 p.m.	at No. 24 Tulane*	No. 20	Yulman Stadium; New Orleans, LA (rivalry)	ESPN2	W 37–20	30,000
September 16	6:30 p.m.	Georgia Tech*	No. 17	Vaught–Hemingway Stadium; Oxford, MS	SECN	W 48–23	64,150
September 23	2:30 p.m.	at No. 13 Alabama	No. 15	Bryant–Denny Stadium; Tuscaloosa, AL (rivalry)	CBS	L 10–24	100,077
September 30	5:00 p.m.	No. 13 LSU	No. 20	Vaught–Hemingway Stadium; Oxford, MS (Magnolia Bowl)	ESPN	W 55–49	66,703
October 7	6:30 p.m.	Arkansas	No. 16	Vaught–Hemingway Stadium; Oxford, MS (rivalry)	SECN	W 27–20	65,748
October 21	6:00 p.m.	at Auburn	No. 13	Jordan-Hare Stadium; Auburn, AL (rivalry)	ESPN	W 28–21	88,043
October 28	6:30 p.m.	Vanderbilt^{†}	No. 12	Vaught–Hemingway Stadium; Oxford, MS (rivalry)	SECN	W 33–7	62,914
November 4	11:00 a.m.	Texas A&M	No. 10	Vaught–Hemingway Stadium; Oxford, MS (SEC Nation)	ESPN	W 38–35	65,680
November 11	6:00 p.m.	at No. 2 Georgia	No. 9	Sanford Stadium; Athens, GA (College GameDay)	ESPN	L 17–52	92,746
November 18	11:00 a.m.	Louisiana–Monroe*	No. 13	Vaught–Hemingway Stadium; Oxford, MS	SECN	W 35–3	60,752
November 23	6:30 p.m.	at Mississippi State	No. 12	Davis Wade Stadium; Starkville, MS (Egg Bowl)	ESPN	W 17–7	60,412
December 30	11:00 a.m.	vs. No. 10 Penn State*	No. 11	Mercedes-Benz Stadium; Atlanta, GA (Peach Bowl)	ESPN	W 38–25	71,230
*Non-conference game; ^{†}Homecoming; Rankings from AP Poll (and CFP Rankings, after October 31) – Released prior to game; All times are in Central time

== Game summaries ==
=== No. 20 (FCS) Mercer ===
Uniform Combination
Helmet	Jersey	Pants

No. 20 (FCS) Mercer Bears (1–0) at No. 22 Ole Miss Rebels (0–0)

Quarter	1	2	3	4	Total
No. 20 (FCS) Bears	7	0	0	0	7
No. 22 Rebels	28	10	28	7	73

at Vaught-Hemingway Stadium • Oxford, MS

- Date: Saturday, September 2, 2023
- Game time: 1:00 p.m. CST
- Game weather: Cloudy • Temperature: 81 °F (27 °C)
- Game attendance: 60,097
- Referee: Ted Pitts
- TV announcers (ESPN+/SECN+):
  Justin Kutcher (play-by-play)
  Dave Steckel (color)

Game information

First Quarter

- (14:05) Ole Miss – Tre Harris 38 Yd pass from Jaxson Dart (Caden Davis Kick)
  Ole Miss 7–0; 3 plays, 72 yards, 0:51
- (13:53) Mercer – Carter Peevy 75 Yd Run (Reice Griffith Kick)
  Tied 7–7; 1 play, 75 yards, 0:12
- (12:26) Ole Miss – Tre Harris 28 Yd pass from Jaxson Dart (Caden Costa Kick)
  Ole Miss 14–7; 5 plays, 69 yards, 1:21
- (11:45) Ole Miss – Tre Harris 20 Yd pass from Jaxson Dart (Caden Davis Kick)
  Ole Miss 21–7; 2 plays, 20 yards, 0:34
- (5:45) Ole Miss – Quinshon Judkins 1 Yd Run (Caden Costa Kick)
  Ole Miss 28–7; 7 plays, 77 yards, 0:51

Second Quarter

- (6:25) Ole Miss – Caden Davis 31 Yd Field Goal
  Ole Miss 31–7; 9 plays, 20 yards, 2:51
- (0:32) Ole Miss – Quinshon Judkins 3 Yd Run (Caden Davis Kick)
  Ole Miss 38–7; 10 plays, 84 yards, 2:33

Third Quarter

- (13:07) Ole Miss – Jordan Watkins 70 Yd Punt Return (Caden Costa Kick)
  Ole Miss 45–7
- (9:45) Ole Miss – Tre Harris 16 Yd pass from Jaxson Dart (Caden Davis Kick)
  Ole Miss 52–7; 3 plays, 27 yards, 1:15
- (5:27) Ole Miss – Ulysses Bentley IV 6 Yd pass from Spencer Sanders (Caden Costa Kick)
  Ole Miss 59–7; 10 plays, 76 yards, 2:41
- (3:09) Ole Miss – Cayden Lee 34 Yd pass from Spencer Sanders (Caden Davis Kick)
  Ole Miss 66–7; 6 plays, 66 yards, 1:25

Fourth Quarter

- (3:21) Ole Miss – Matt Jones 1 Yd Run (Caden Costa Kick)
  Ole Miss 73–7; 12 plays, 65 yards, 5:25

Statistics	MER	MISS
First downs	15	32
Total yards	235	667
Passing yards	142	524
Rushes/yards	37/93	33/143
Penalties/yards	7/50	7/65
Turnovers	3	1
Time of possession	35:10	24:50

Team	Category	Player	Statistics
Mercer	Passing	Carter Peevy	16/29, 138 yards, 1 INT
Mercer	Rushing	Carter Peevy	7 carries, 49 yards, 1 TD
Mercer	Receiving	Devron Harper	4 receptions, 47 yards
Ole Miss	Passing	Jaxson Dart	18/23, 334 yards, 4 TD
Ole Miss	Rushing	Quinshon Judkins	13 carries, 60 yards, 2 TD
Ole Miss	Receiving	Tre Harris	6 receptions, 133 yards, 4 TD

=== At No. 24 Tulane ===
Uniform Combination
Helmet	Jersey	Pants

No. 20 Ole Miss Rebels (1–0) at No. 24 Tulane Green Wave (1–0)

Quarter	1	2	3	4	Total
No. 20 Rebels	7	3	7	20	37
No. 24 Green Wave	7	10	0	3	20

at Yulman Stadium • New Orleans, LA

- Date: Saturday, September 9, 2023
- Game time: 2:30 p.m. CST
- Game weather: Sunny • Temperature: 90 °F (32 °C)
- Game attendance: 30,000
- Referee: Tim Rich
- TV announcers (ESPN2):
  Dave Pasch (play-by-play)
  Dusty Dvoracek (color)
  Tom Luginbill (sideline)

Game information

First Quarter

- (14:12) Ole Miss – Tre Harris 31 Yd pass from Jaxson Dart (Caden Davis Kick)
  Ole Miss 7–0; 3 plays, 75 yards, 0:48
- (9:37) Tulane – Makhi Hughes 2 Yd Run (Valentino Ambrosio Kick)
  Tied 7–7; 9 plays, 75 yards, 4:35

Second Quarter

- (14:10) Tulane – Valentino Ambrosio 44 Yd Field Goal
  Tulane 10–7; 7 plays, 7 yards, 2:58
- (14:10) Tulane – Jha'Quan Jackson 41 Yd pass from Kai Horton (Valentino Ambrosio Kick)
  Tulane 17–7; 4 plays, 54 yards, 1:45
- (1:36) Ole Miss – Caden Davis 37 Yd Field Goal
  Tulane 17–10; 13 plays, 62 yards, 4:05

Third Quarter

- (6:11) Ole Miss – Quinshon Judkins 9 Yd Run (Caden Davis Kick)
  Tied 17–17; 4 plays, 64 yards, 1:24

Fourth Quarter

- (12:50) Ole Miss – Caden Davis 27 Yd Field Goal
  Ole Miss 20–17; 6 plays, 10 yards, 2:40
- (4:28) Ole Miss – Michael Trigg 21 Yd pass from Jaxson Dart (Caden Davis Kick)
  Ole Miss 27–17; 5 plays, 70 yards, 2:21
- (2:56) Tulane – Valentino Ambrosio 26 Yd Field Goal
  Ole Miss 27–20; 10 plays, 67 yards, 1:32
- (1:53) Ole Miss – Caden Davis 56 Yd Field Goal
  Ole Miss 30–20; 4 plays, 4 yards, 1:03
- (1:25) Ole Miss – Jared Ivey 26 Yd Fumble Return (Caden Davis Kick)
  Ole Miss 37–20

Statistics	MISS	TULN
First downs	18	19
Total yards	363	342
Passing yards	274	231
Rushes/yards	35/89	45/111
Penalties/yards	5/51	2/10
Turnovers	1	2
Time of possession	25:15	34:45

Team	Category	Player	Statistics
Ole Miss	Passing	Jaxson Dart	17/27, 267 yards, 2 TD, 1 INT
Ole Miss	Rushing	Quinshon Judkins	18 carries, 48 yards, 1 TD
Ole Miss	Receiving	Dayton Wade	7 receptions, 106 yards
Tulane	Passing	Kai Horton	15/37, 231 yards, 1 TD, 1 INT
Tulane	Rushing	Makhi Hughes	23 carries, 92 yards, 1 TD
Tulane	Receiving	Lawrence Keys III	5 receptions, 94 yards

=== Georgia Tech ===
Uniform Combination
Helmet	Jersey	Pants

Georgia Tech Yellow Jackets (1–1) at No. 17 Ole Miss Rebels (2–0)

Quarter	1	2	3	4	Total
Yellow Jackets	0	3	7	13	23
No. 17 Rebels	10	0	14	24	48

at Vaught-Hemingway Stadium • Oxford, MS

- Date: Saturday, September 16, 2023
- Game time: 6:30 p.m. CST
- Game weather: Clear Skies • Temperature: 85 °F (29 °C)
- Game attendance: 64,150
- Referee: Daniel Gautreaux
- TV announcers (SECN):
  Tom Hart (play-by-play)
  Jordan Rodgers (color)
  Cole Cubelic (sideline)

Game information

First Quarter

- (12:38) Ole Miss – Caden Davis 47 Yd Field Goal
  Ole Miss 3–0; 8 plays, 50 yards, 2:17
- (3:02) Ole Miss – Jaxson Dart 1 Yd Run (Caden Davis Kick)
  Ole Miss 10–0; 8 plays, 34 yards, 3:15

Second Quarter

- (1:09) Georgia Tech – Aidan Birr 22 Yd Field Goal
  Ole Miss 10–3; 17 plays, 90 yards, 8:26

Third Quarter

- (9:45) Ole Miss – Ulysses Bentley IV 21 Yd Run (Caden Davis Kick)
  Ole Miss 17–3; 5 plays, 71 yards, 2:19
- (6:00) Ole Miss – Jaxson Dart 6 Yd Run (Caden Davis Kick)
  Ole Miss 24–3; 5 plays, 28 yards, 1:38
- (2:07) Georgia Tech – Haynes King 1 Yd Run (Aidan Birr Kick)
  Ole Miss 24–10; 9 plays, 78 yards, 3:47

Fourth Quarter

- (10:31) Georgia Tech – Eric Singleton Jr. 15 Yd pass from Haynes King (Aidan Birr Kick)
  Ole Miss 24–17; 10 plays, 68 yards, 4:23
- (7:45) Ole Miss – Caden Davis 45 Yd Field Goal
  Ole Miss 27–17; 7 plays, 48 yards, 2:46
- (5:59) Ole Miss – Jordan Watkins 68 Yd pass from Jaxson Dart (Caden Davis Kick)
  Ole Miss 34–17; 2 plays, 68 yards, 0:41
- (3:40) Ole Miss – Quinshon Judkins 1 Yd Run (Caden Davis Kick)
  Ole Miss 41–17; 2 plays, 34 yards, 0:41
- (1:34) Georgia Tech – Avery Boyd 14 Yd pass from Haynes King (Two-Point Pass Conversion Failed)
  Ole Miss 41–23; 9 plays, 75 yards, 2:06
- (0:49) Ole Miss – Matt Jones 36 Yd Run (Caden Davis Kick)
  Ole Miss 48–23; 2 plays, 50 yards, 0:44

Statistics	GT	MISS
First downs	26	19
Total yards	474	550
Passing yards	307	251
Rushes/yards	47/167	37/299
Penalties/yards	0/0	5/40
Turnovers	0	0
Time of possession	39:17	20:43

Team	Category	Player	Statistics
Georgia Tech	Passing	Haynes King	28/41, 307 yards, 2 TD
Georgia Tech	Rushing	Jamal Haynes	19 carries, 72 yards
Georgia Tech	Receiving	Eric Singleton Jr.	5 receptions, 97 yards, 1 TD
Ole Miss	Passing	Jaxson Dart	10/18, 251 yards, 1 TD
Ole Miss	Rushing	Jaxson Dart	14 carries, 136 yards, 2 TD
Ole Miss	Receiving	Jordan Watkins	4 receptions, 119 yards, 1 TD

=== At No. 13 Alabama ===
Uniform Combination
Helmet	Jersey	Pants

No. 15 Ole Miss Rebels (3–0) at No. 13 Alabama Crimson Tide (2–1)

Quarter	1	2	3	4	Total
No. 15 Rebels	7	0	3	0	10
No. 13 Crimson Tide	3	3	11	7	24

at Bryant-Denny Stadium • Tuscaloosa, AL

- Date: Saturday, September 23, 2023
- Game time: 2:30 p.m. CST
- Game weather: Sunny • Temperature: 89 °F (32 °C)
- Game attendance: 100,077
- Referee: Scott Walker
- TV announcers (CBS):
  Tom McCarthy (play-by-play)
  Ross Tucker (color)
  Jason McCourty (color)
  Tiffany Blackmon (sideline)

Game information

First Quarter

- (6:57) Alabama – Will Reichard 48 Yd Field Goal
  Alabama 3–0; 11 plays, 61 yards, 6:02
- (3:55) Ole Miss – Jaxson Dart 10 Yd Run (Caden Davis Kick)
  Ole Miss 7–3; 7 plays, 75 yards, 3:02

Second Quarter

- (5:42) Alabama – Will Reichard 40 Yd Field Goal
  Ole Miss 7–6; 4 plays, −21 yards, 2:02

Third Quarter

- (11:09) Alabama – Will Reichard 23 Yd Field Goal
  Alabama 9–7; 9 plays, 70 yards, 3:01
- (6:29) Alabama – Jalen Hale 33 Yd pass from Jalen Milroe (Ty Simpson Run for Two-Point Conversion)
  Alabama 17–7; 5 plays, 69 yards, 2:38
- (0:34) Ole Miss – Caden Davis 35 Yd Field Goal
  Alabama 17–10; 14 plays, 58 yards, 5:51

Fourth Quarter

- (12:10) Alabama – Jase McClellan 8 Yd Run (Will Reichard Kick)
  Alabama 24–10; 6 plays, 75 yards, 3:24

Statistics	MISS	ALA
First downs	17	20
Total yards	301	356
Passing yards	245	225
Rushes/yards	29/56	45/131
Penalties/yards	8/69	6/60
Turnovers	1	1
Time of possession	25:37	34:23

Team	Category	Player	Statistics
Ole Miss	Passing	Jaxson Dart	20/35, 244 yards, 1 INT
Ole Miss	Rushing	Quinshon Judkins	13 carries, 56 yards
Ole Miss	Receiving	Dayton Wade	5 receptions, 88 yards
Alabama	Passing	Jalen Milroe	17/21, 225 yards, 1 TD, 1 INT
Alabama	Rushing	Jase McClellan	17 carries, 105 yards, 1 TD
Alabama	Receiving	Jalen Hale	2 receptions, 63 yards, 1 TD

=== No. 13 LSU ===
Uniform Combination
Helmet	Jersey	Pants

No. 13 LSU Tigers (3–1) at No. 20 Ole Miss Rebels (3–1)

Quarter	1	2	3	4	Total
No. 13 Tigers	7	21	14	7	49
No. 20 Rebels	21	10	3	21	55

at Vaught-Hemingway Stadium • Oxford, MS

- Date: Saturday, September 30, 2023
- Game time: 5:00 p.m. CST
- Game weather: Sunny • Temperature: 88 °F (31 °C)
- Game attendance: 66,703
- Referee: David Smith
- TV announcers (ESPN):
  Bob Wischusen (play-by-play)
  Robert Griffin III (color)
  Kris Budden (sideline)

Game information

First Quarter

- (10:25) Ole Miss – Quinshon Judkins 4 Yd pass from Jaxson Dart (Caden Davis Kick)
  Ole Miss 7–0; 14 plays, 75 yards, 4:35
- (4:00) Ole Miss – Ulysses Bentley IV 43 Yd Run (Caden Davis Kick)
  Ole Miss 14–0; 3 plays, 71 yards, 0:44
- (1:25) LSU – Brian Thomas Jr. 20 Yd pass from Jayden Daniels (Damian Ramos Kick)
  Ole Miss 14–7; 6 plays, 75 yards, 2:35
- (0:12) Ole Miss – Jordan Watkins 63 Yd pass from Jaxson Dart (Caden Davis Kick)
  Ole Miss 21–7; 4 plays, 75 yards, 1:13

Second Quarter

- (12:46) LSU – Logan Diggs 1 Yd Run (Damian Ramos Kick)
  Ole Miss 21–14; 6 plays, 78 yards, 2:26
- (8:10) Ole Miss – Dayton Wade 15 Yd pass from Jaxson Dart (Caden Davis Kick)
  Ole Miss 28–14; 10 plays, 78 yards, 4:36
- (4:30) LSU – Brian Thomas Jr. 11 Yd pass from Jayden Daniels (Damian Ramos Kick)
  Ole Miss 28–21; 7 plays, 75 yards, 3:40
- (1:42) Ole Miss – Caden Davis 28 Yd Field Goal
  Ole Miss 31–21; 7 plays, 65 yards, 2:48
- (0:58) LSU – Kyren Lacy 29 Yd pass from Jayden Daniels (Damian Ramos Kick)
  Ole Miss 31–28; 5 plays, 75 yards, 0:44

Third Quarter

- (11:30) LSU – Jayden Daniels 1 Yd Run (Damian Ramos Kick)
  LSU 35–31; 8 plays, 85 yards, 3:30
- (8:20) Ole Miss – Caden Davis 48 Yd Field Goal
  LSU 35–34; 9 plays, 45 yards, 3:10
- (3:41) LSU – Logan Diggs 12 Yd Run (Damian Ramos Kick)
  LSU 42–34; 9 plays, 75 yards, 4:39

Fourth Quarter

- (14:13) Ole Miss – Quinshon Judkins 11 Yd Run (Two-Point Pass Conversion Failed)
  LSU 42–40; 13 plays, 75 yards, 4:28
- (8:34) LSU – Brian Thomas Jr. 34 Yd pass from Jayden Daniels (Damian Ramos Kick)
  LSU 49–40; 4 plays, 55 yards, 1:53
- (5:06) Ole Miss – Jaxson Dart 1 Yd Run (Caden Davis Kick)
  LSU 49–47; 10 plays, 65 yards, 3:28
- (0:39) Ole Miss – Tre Harris 13 Yd pass from Jaxson Dart (Quinshon Judkins Run for Two-Point Conversion)
  Ole Miss 55–49; 8 plays, 88 yards, 1:57

Statistics	LSU	MISS
First downs	33	32
Total yards	637	*706
Passing yards	414	389
Rushes/yards	37/223	49/317
Penalties/yards	6/35	11/121
Turnovers	1	0
Time of possession	29:17	30:43

Team	Category	Player	Statistics
LSU	Passing	Jayden Daniels	27/36, 414 yards, 4 TD
LSU	Rushing	Logan Diggs	19 carries, 101 yards, 2 TD
LSU	Receiving	Brian Thomas Jr.	8 receptions, 124 yards, 3 TD
Ole Miss	Passing	Jaxson Dart	26/39, 389 yards, 4 TD
Ole Miss	Rushing	Quinshon Judkins	33 carries, 177 yards, 1 TD
Ole Miss	Receiving	Tre Harris	8 receptions, 153 yards, 1 TD

*The most total yards any LSU football team has allowed in a single game.

=== Arkansas ===
Uniform Combination
Helmet	Jersey	Pants

Arkansas Razorbacks (2–3) at No. 16 Ole Miss Rebels (4–1)

Quarter	1	2	3	4	Total
Razorbacks	7	0	6	7	20
No. 16 Rebels	10	7	0	10	27

at Vaught-Hemingway Stadium • Oxford, MS

- Date: Saturday, October 7, 2023
- Game time: 6:30 p.m. CST
- Game weather: Clear Skies • Temperature: 61 °F (16 °C)
- Game attendance: 65,748
- Referee: Ken Williamson
- TV announcers (SECN):
  Tom Hart (play-by-play)
  Jordan Rodgers (color)
  Cole Cubelic (sideline)

Game information

First Quarter

- (6:08) Arkansas – Ty Washington 3 Yd pass from KJ Jefferson (Cam Little Kick)
  Arkansas 7–0; 15 plays, 80 yards, 7:46
- (2:47) Ole Miss – Caden Davis 27 Yd Field Goal
  Arkansas 7–3; 10 plays, 66 yards, 3:21
- (0:29) Ole Miss – Quinshon Judkins 1 Yd Run (Caden Davis Kick)
  Ole Miss 10–7; 4 plays, 3 yards, 1:45

Second Quarter

- (1:34) Ole Miss – Dayton Wade 6 Yd pass from Jaxson Dart (Caden Davis Kick)
  Ole Miss 17–7; 5 plays, 50 yards, 1:02

Third Quarter

- (10:07) Arkansas – Cam Little 56 Yd Field Goal
  Ole Miss 17–10; 10 plays, 37 yards, 4:53
- (2:46) Arkansas – Cam Little 26 Yd Field Goal
  Ole Miss 17–13; 11 plays, 31 yards, 5:12

Fourth Quarter

- (13:11) Arkansas – Ty Washington 17 Yd pass from KJ Jefferson (Cam Little Kick)
  Arkansas 20–17; 6 plays, 72 yards, 2:52
- (7:49) Ole Miss – Ulysses Bentley IV 7 Yd Run (Caden Davis Kick)
  Ole Miss 24–20; 12 plays, 75 yards, 5:22
- (2:43) Ole Miss – Caden Davis 22 Yd Field Goal
  Ole Miss 27–20; 8 plays, 63 yards, 3:01

Statistics	ARK	MISS
First downs	17	21
Total yards	286	349
Passing yards	250	153
Rushes/yards	29/36	45/196
Penalties/yards	10/70	5/44
Turnovers	2	0
Time of possession	32:32	27:28

Team	Category	Player	Statistics
Arkansas	Passing	KJ Jefferson	25/39, 250 yards, 2 TD, 2 INT
Arkansas	Rushing	Raheim Sanders	8 carries, 15 yards
Arkansas	Receiving	Ty Washington	7 receptions, 90 yards, 2 TD
Ole Miss	Passing	Jaxson Dart	16/25, 153 yards, 1 TD
Ole Miss	Rushing	Ulysses Bentley IV	13 carries, 94 yards, 1 TD
Ole Miss	Receiving	Jordan Watkins	7 receptions, 86 yards

=== At Auburn ===
Uniform Combination
Helmet	Jersey	Pants

No. 13 Ole Miss Rebels (5–1) at Auburn Tigers (3–3)

Quarter	1	2	3	4	Total
No. 13 Rebels	14	0	7	7	28
Tigers	7	7	0	7	21

at Jordan-Hare Stadium • Auburn, AL

- Date: Saturday, October 21, 2023
- Game time: 6:00 p.m. CST
- Game weather: Partly Cloudy • Temperature: 69 °F (21 °C)
- Game attendance: 88,043
- Referee: Lee Hedrick
- TV announcers (ESPN): Joe Tessitore (play-by-play)
  Jesse Palmer (color)
  Molly McGrath (sideline)

Game information

First Quarter

- (4:55) Ole Miss – Zakhari Franklin 11 Yd pass from Jaxson Dart (Caden Davis Kick)
  Ole Miss 7–0; 9 plays, 48 yards, 6:07
- (2:59) Auburn – Jarquez Hunter 53 Yd Run (Alex McPherson Kick)
  Tied 7–7; 5 plays, 75 yards, 1:56
- (0:24) Ole Miss – Jaxson Dart 29 Yd Run (Caden Davis Kick)
  Ole Miss 14–7; 6 plays, 75 yards, 2:35

Second Quarter

- (11:44) Auburn – Jarquez Hunter 1 Yd Run (Alex McPherson Kick)
  Tied 14–14; 4 plays, 24 yards, 1:42

Third Quarter

- (0:00) Ole Miss – Jaxson Dart 1 Yd Run (Caden Davis Kick)
  Ole Miss 21–14; 8 plays, 89 yards, 2:32

Fourth Quarter

- (7:51) Ole Miss – Quinshon Judkins 4 Yd Run (Caden Davis Kick)
  Ole Miss 28–14; 9 plays, 68 yards, 5:08
- (0:56) Auburn – Rivaldo Fairweather 8 Yd pass from Payton Thorne (Alex McPherson Kick)
  Ole Miss 28–21; 8 plays, 67 yards, 1:38

Statistics	MISS	AUB
First downs	21	10
Total yards	425	275
Passing yards	202	122
Rushes/yards	56/223	39/153
Penalties/yards	10/66	7/66
Turnovers	2	2
Time of possession	34:05	25:55

Team	Category	Player	Statistics
Ole Miss	Passing	Jaxson Dart	10/17, 202 yards, 1 TD, 1 INT
Ole Miss	Rushing	Quinshon Judkins	21 carries, 124 yards, 1 TD
Ole Miss	Receiving	Tre Harris	4 receptions, 102 yards
Auburn	Passing	Payton Thorne	9/13, 100 yards, 1 TD, 1 INT
Auburn	Rushing	Jarquez Hunter	15 carries, 91 yards, 2 TD
Auburn	Receiving	Jarquez Hunter	3 receptions, 54 yards

=== Vanderbilt ===
Uniform Combination
Helmet	Jersey	Pants

Vanderbilt Commodores (2–6) at No. 12 Ole Miss Rebels (6–1)

Quarter	1	2	3	4	Total
Commodores	0	0	7	0	7
No. 12 Rebels	13	13	0	7	33

at Vaught-Hemingway Stadium • Oxford, MS

- Date: Saturday, October 28, 2023
- Game time: 6:30 p.m. CST
- Game weather: Cloudy • Temperature: 76 °F (24 °C)
- Game attendance: 62,914
- Referee: Ken Williamson
- TV announcers (SECN):
  Tom Hart (play-by-play)
  Jordan Rodgers (color)
  Cole Cubelic (sideline)

Game information

First Quarter

- (13:21) Ole Miss – Quinshon Judkins 18 Yd Run (Caden Davis Kick)
  Ole Miss 7–0; 6 plays, 75 yards, 1:39
- (10:34) Ole Miss – Caden Davis 27 Yd Field Goal
  Ole Miss 10–0; 4 plays, 2 yards, 1:16
- (0:33) Ole Miss – Caden Davis 48 Yd Field Goal
  Ole Miss 13–0; 10 plays, 38 yards, 3:58

Second Quarter

- (11:11) Ole Miss – Jaxson Dart 1 Yd Run (Caden Davis Kick)
  Ole Miss 20–0; 6 plays, 72 yards, 2:52
- (7:40) Ole Miss – Dayton Wade 6 Yd pass from Jaxson Dart (Two-Point Pass Conversion Failed)
  Ole Miss 26–0; 5 plays, 32 yards, 1:53

Third Quarter

- (1:57) Vanderbilt – Walter Taylor 2 Yd Run (Jacob Borcila Kick)
  Ole Miss 26–7; 10 plays, 65 yards, 5:30

Fourth Quarter

- (9:33) Ole Miss – Quinshon Judkins 3 Yd Run (Caden Davis Kick)
  Ole Miss 33–7; 9 plays, 47 yards, 3:16

Statistics	VAN	MISS
First downs	12	23
Total yards	229	431
Passing yards	60	254
Rushes/yards	44/169	40/177
Penalties/yards	4/32	6/46
Turnovers	2	1
Time of possession	32:59	27:01

Team	Category	Player	Statistics
Vanderbilt	Passing	Walter Taylor	4/12, 38 yards, 1 INT
Vanderbilt	Rushing	Walter Taylor	20 carries, 59 yards, 1 TD
Vanderbilt	Receiving	Junior Sherrill	2 receptions, 28 yards
Ole Miss	Passing	Jaxson Dart	19/28, 240 yards, 1 TD, 1 INT
Ole Miss	Rushing	Quinshon Judkins	17 carries, 124 yards, 2 TD
Ole Miss	Receiving	Dayton Wade	8 receptions, 120 yards, 1 TD

=== Texas A&M ===
Uniform Combination
Helmet	Jersey	Pants

Texas A&M Aggies (5–3) at No. 10 Ole Miss Rebels (7–1)

Quarter	1	2	3	4	Total
Aggies	0	14	7	14	35
No. 10 Rebels	7	13	11	7	38

at Vaught-Hemingway Stadium • Oxford, MS

- Date: Saturday, November 4, 2023
- Game time: 11:00 a.m. CST
- Game weather: Sunny • Temperature: 65 °F (18 °C)
- Game attendance: 65,680
- Referee: David Smith
- TV announcers (ESPN):
  Joe Tessitore (play-by-play)
  Jordan Rodgers (color)
  Katie George (sideline)

Game information

First Quarter

- (7:45) Ole Miss – Quinshon Judkins 9 Yd Run (Caden Davis Kick)
  Ole Miss 7–0; 11 plays, 81 yards, 3:02

Second Quarter

- (12:53) Ole Miss – Tre Harris 11 Yd pass from Jaxson Dart (Caden Davis Kick)
  Ole Miss 14–0; 8 plays, 94 yards, 2:39
- (8:12) Texas A&M – Jacoby Mathews 75 Yd Return of Blocked Field Goal (Randy Bond Kick)
  Ole Miss 14–7
- (6:53) Ole Miss – Jordan Watkins 29 Yd pass from Jaxson Dart (Two-Point Pass Conversion Failed)
  Ole Miss 20–7; 4 plays, 66 yards, 1:19
- (1:44) Texas A&M – Le'Veon Moss 13 Yd Run (Randy Bond Kick)
  Ole Miss 20–14; 12 plays, 75 yards, 5:09

Third Quarter

- (7:04) Ole Miss – Quinshon Judkins 6 Yd Run (Jaxson Dart Pass to Tre Harris for Two-Point Conversion)
  Ole Miss 28–14; 5 plays, 80 yards, 1:13
- (5:05) Texas A&M – Jake Johnson 28 Yd pass from Max Johnson (Randy Bond Kick)
  Ole Miss 28–21; 5 plays, 75 yards, 1:59
- (0:46) Ole Miss – Caden Davis 22 Yd Field Goal
  Ole Miss 31–21; 13 plays, 71 yards, 4:19

Fourth Quarter

- (12:04) Texas A&M – Amari Daniels 1 Yd Run (Randy Bond Kick)
  Ole Miss 31–28; 9 plays, 75 yards, 3:42
- (4:34) Texas A&M – Max Johnson 1 Yd Run (Randy Bond Kick)
  Texas A&M 35–31; 12 plays, 67 yards, 6:24
- (1:40) Ole Miss – Quinshon Judkins 1 Yd Run (Caden Davis Kick)
  Ole Miss 38–35; 9 plays, 75 yards, 2:54

Statistics	TA&M	MISS
First downs	30	26
Total yards	457	518
Passing yards	305	387
Rushes/yards	36/152	33/131
Penalties/yards	9/73	8/61
Turnovers	1	0
Time of possession	35:37	24:23

Team	Category	Player	Statistics
Texas A&M	Passing	Max Johnson	31/42, 305 yards, 1 TD, 1 INT
Texas A&M	Rushing	Amari Daniels	12 carries, 70 yards, 1 TD
Texas A&M	Receiving	Jahdae Walker	8 receptions, 100 yards
Ole Miss	Passing	Jaxson Dart	24/33, 387 yards, 2 TD
Ole Miss	Rushing	Quinshon Judkins	23 carries, 102 yards, 3 TD
Ole Miss	Receiving	Tre Harris	11 receptions, 213 yards, 1 TD

=== At No. 2 Georgia ===
Uniform Combination
Helmet	Jersey	Pants

No. 9 Ole Miss Rebels (8–1) at No. 2 Georgia Bulldogs (9–0)

Quarter	1	2	3	4	Total
No. 9 Rebels	7	7	0	3	17
No. 2 Bulldogs	14	14	10	14	52

at Sanford Stadium • Athens, Georgia

- Date: Saturday, November 11, 2023
- Game time: 6:00 p.m. CST (7:00 p.m. local EST)
- Game weather: Light Rain • Temperature: 51 °F (11 °C)
- Game attendance: 92,746
- Referee: Jason Autrey
- TV announcers (ESPN):
  Chris Fowler (play-by-play)
  Kirk Herbstreit (color)
  Holly Rowe (sideline)

Game information

First Quarter

- (10:30) Ole Miss – Quinshon Judkins 15 Yd Run (Caden Davis Kick)
  Ole Miss 7–0; 11 plays, 75 yards, 4:30
- (7:28) Georgia – Daijun Edwards 1 Yd Run (Peyton Woodring Kick)
  Tied 7–7; 6 plays, 75 yards, 3:02
- (3:09) Georgia – Ladd McConkey 29 Yd pass from Carson Beck (Peyton Woodring Kick)
  Georgia 14–7; 3 plays, 60 yards, 1:22

Second Quarter

- (14:16) Ole Miss – Quinshon Judkins 4 Yd Run (Caden Davis Kick)
  Tied 14–14; 9 plays, 75 yards, 3:53
- (9:58) Georgia – Daijun Edwards 1 Yd Run (Peyton Woodring Kick)
  Georgia 21–14; 8 plays, 75 yards, 4:18
- (2:27) Georgia – Kendall Milton 7 Yd Run (Peyton Woodring Kick)
  Georgia 28–14; 9 plays, 62 yards, 5:31

Third Quarter

- (9:15) Georgia – Kendall Milton 33 Yd Run (Peyton Woodring Kick)
  Georgia 35–14; 4 plays, 75 yards, 1:48
- (3:50) Georgia – Peyton Woodring 27 Yd Field Goal
  Georgia 38–14; 8 plays, 67 yards, 3:31

Fourth Quarter

- (14:12) Georgia – Brock Bowers 8 Yd pass from Carson Beck (Peyton Woodring Kick)
  Georgia 45–14; 7 plays, 79 yards, 3:26
- (8:50) Ole Miss – Caden Davis 29 Yd Field Goal
  Georgia 45–17; 13 plays, 63 yards, 5:22
- (4:12) Georgia – Andrew Paul 4 Yd Run (Peyton Woodring Kick)
  Georgia 52–17; 8 plays, 75 yards, 4:38

Statistics	MISS	UGA
First downs	18	25
Total yards	352	611
Passing yards	173	311
Rushes/yards	45/179	35/300
Penalties/yards	9/68	5/55
Turnovers	1	1
Time of possession	29:03	30:57

Team	Category	Player	Statistics
Ole Miss	Passing	Jaxson Dart	10/17, 112 yards, 1 INT
Ole Miss	Rushing	Quinshon Judkins	22 carries, 75 yards, 2 TD
Ole Miss	Receiving	Caden Prieskorn	2 receptions, 48 yards
Georgia	Passing	Carson Beck	18/25, 306 yards, 2 TD, 1 INT
Georgia	Rushing	Kendall Milton	9 carries, 127 yards, 2 TD
Georgia	Receiving	Ladd McConkey	4 receptions, 81 yards, 1 TD

=== Louisiana–Monroe ===
Uniform Combination
Helmet	Jersey	Pants

Louisiana–Monroe Warhawks (2–8) at No. 13 Ole Miss Rebels (8–2)

Quarter	1	2	3	4	Total
Warhawks	0	3	0	0	3
No. 13 Rebels	7	0	21	7	35

at Vaught-Hemingway Stadium • Oxford, MS

- Date: Saturday, November 18, 2023
- Game time: 11:00 a.m. CST
- Game weather: Sunny • Temperature: 58 °F (14 °C)
- Game attendance: 60,752
- Referee: Matt Loeffler
- TV announcers (SECN):
  Taylor Zarzour (play-by-play)
  Matt Stinchcomb (color)
  Alyssa Lang (sideline)

Game information

First Quarter

- (4:26) Ole Miss – Ulysses Bentley IV 14 Yd Run (Caden Davis Kick)
  Ole Miss 7–0; 10 plays, 85 yards, 2:59

Second Quarter

- (0:00) Louisiana–Monroe – Braxton Guilbeau 26 Yd Field Goal
  Ole Miss 7–3; 17 plays, 71 yards, 6:25

Third Quarter

- (9:44) Ole Miss – Tre Harris 13 Yd pass from Jaxson Dart (Caden Davis Kick)
  Ole Miss 14–3; 9 plays, 78 yards, 2:33
- (4:15) Ole Miss – Caden Prieskorn 2 Yd pass from Jaxson Dart (Caden Davis Kick)
  Ole Miss 21–3; 8 plays, 60 yards, 3:04
- (1:46) Ole Miss – Dayton Wade 58 Yd pass from Jaxson Dart (Caden Davis Kick)
  Ole Miss 28–3; 3 plays, 60 yards, 1:07

Fourth Quarter

- (6:12) Ole Miss – Cayden Lee 51 Yd pass from Spencer Sanders (Caden Costa Kick)
  Ole Miss 35–3; 6 plays, 81 yards, 2:02

Statistics	ULM	MISS
First downs	19	27
Total yards	258	498
Passing yards	66	371
Rushes/yards	46/192	37/127
Penalties/yards	7/65	8/81
Turnovers	1	0
Time of possession	34:04	25:56

Team	Category	Player	Statistics
Louisiana–Monroe	Passing	Jiya Wright	7/19, 56 yards, 1 INT
Louisiana–Monroe	Rushing	Hunter Smith	17 carries, 74 yards
Louisiana–Monroe	Receiving	Tyrone Howell	3 receptions, 34 yards
Ole Miss	Passing	Jaxson Dart	24/31, 310 yards, 3 TD
Ole Miss	Rushing	Quinshon Judkins	18 carries, 65 yards
Ole Miss	Receiving	Dayton Wade	7 receptions, 108 yards, 1 TD

=== At Mississippi State ===
Uniform Combination
Helmet	Jersey	Pants

No. 12 Ole Miss Rebels (9–2) at Mississippi State Bulldogs (5–6)

Quarter	1	2	3	4	Total
No. 12 Rebels	0	3	7	7	17
Bulldogs	0	0	7	0	7

at Davis Wade Stadium • Starkville, MS

- Date: Thursday, November 23, 2023
- Game time: 6:30 p.m. CST
- Game weather: Cloudy • Temperature: 46 °F (8 °C)
- Game attendance: 60,412
- Referee: Steve Marlowe
- TV announcers (ESPN):
  Tom Hart (play-by-play)
  Jordan Rodgers (color)
  Cole Cubelic (sideline)

Game information

First Quarter

- No scoring plays

Second Quarter

- (8:23) Ole Miss – Caden Costa 36 Yd Field Goal
  Ole Miss 3–0; 13 plays, 66 yards, 6:22

Third Quarter

- (8:33) Mississippi State – Will Rogers 1 Yd Run (Kyle Ferrie Kick)
  Mississippi State 7–3; 10 plays, 71 yards, 4:55
- (4:47) Ole Miss – Quinshon Judkins 2 Yd Run (Caden Davis Kick)
  Ole Miss 10–7; 10 plays, 75 yards, 3:46

Fourth Quarter

- (13:26) Ole Miss – Caden Prieskorn 26 Yd pass from Jaxson Dart (Caden Davis Kick)
  Ole Miss 17–7; 10 plays, 71 yards, 4:26

Statistics	MISS	MSST
First downs	22	16
Total yards	307	303
Passing yards	96	207
Rushes/yards	49/211	28/96
Penalties/yards	6/30	4/56
Turnovers	0	0
Time of possession	31:57	28:03

Team	Category	Player	Statistics
Ole Miss	Passing	Jaxson Dart	14/26, 96 yards, 1 TD
Ole Miss	Rushing	Quinshon Judkins	28 carries, 119 yards, 1 TD
Ole Miss	Receiving	Caden Prieskorn	4 receptions, 38 yards, 1 TD
Mississippi State	Passing	Will Rogers	25/39, 207 yards
Mississippi State	Rushing	Jo'Quavious Marks	12 carries, 39 yards
Mississippi State	Receiving	Zavion Thomas	6 receptions, 88 yards

=== Vs. No. 10 Penn State ===
Uniform Combination
Helmet	Jersey	Pants

No. 11 Ole Miss Rebels (10–2) vs. No. 10 Penn State Nittany Lions (10–2)

Quarter	1	2	3	4	Total
No. 11 Rebels	10	10	11	7	38
No. 10 Nittany Lions	3	14	0	8	25

at Mercedes–Benz Stadium • Atlanta, GA

- Date: Saturday, December 30, 2023
- Game time: 11:00 a.m. CST (12:00 p.m. local EST)
- Game weather: None (retractable roof closed)
- Game attendance: 71,230
- Referee: Mike McCabe
- TV announcers (ESPN):
  Mark Jones (play-by-play)
  Louis Riddick (color)
  Quint Kessenich (sideline)

Game information

First Quarter

- (9:17) Penn State – Alex Felkins 26 Yd Field Goal
  Penn State 3–0; 10 plays, 64 yards, 4:58
- (7:16) Ole Miss – Caden Davis 36 Yd Field Goal
  Tied 3–3; 8 plays, 56 yards, 2:01
- (0:30) Ole Miss – Caden Prieskorn 6 Yd pass from Jaxson Dart (Caden Davis Kick)
  Ole Miss 10–3; 10 plays, 77 yards, 3:31

Second Quarter

- (13:34) Penn State – Theo Johnson 2 Yd pass from Drew Allar (Alex Felkins Kick)
  Tied 10–10; 6 plays, 75 yards, 1:56
- (10:33) Ole Miss – Caden Davis 45 Yd Field Goal
  Ole Miss 13–10; 9 plays, 52 yards, 3:01
- (4:58) Ole Miss – Caden Prieskorn 37 Yd pass from Jaxson Dart (Caden Davis Kick)
  Ole Miss 20–10; 9 plays, 83 yards, 4:03
- (2:45) Penn State – Nicholas Singleton 48 Yd pass from Beau Pribula (Alex Felkins Kick)
  Ole Miss 20–17; 4 plays, 75 yards, 2:13

Third Quarter

- (10:48) Ole Miss – Caden Davis 52 Yd Field Goal
  Ole Miss 23–17; 9 plays, 40 yards, 2:45
- (4:10) Ole Miss – Quinshon Judkins 14 Yd pass from Jaxson Dart (Jaxson Dart Pass to Caden Prieskorn for Two-Point Conversion)
  Ole Miss 31–17; 10 plays, 82 yards, 4:29

Fourth Quarter

- (6:29) Ole Miss – Jaxson Dart 2 Yd Run (Caden Davis Kick)
  Ole Miss 38–17; 10 plays, 65 yards, 4:26
- (4:14) Penn State – Harrison Wallace III 14 Yd pass from Drew Allar (Beau Pribula Pass to Nicholas Singleton for Two-Point Conversion)
  Ole Miss 38–25; 4 plays, 70 yards, 0:54

Statistics	MISS	PSU
First downs	30	21
Total yards	540	510
Passing yards	394	343
Rushes/yards	47/146	28/167
Penalties/yards	5/26	6/50
Turnovers	0	2
Time of possession	33:38	26:22

Team	Category	Player	Statistics
Ole Miss	Passing	Jaxson Dart	25/40, 379 yards, 3 TD
Ole Miss	Rushing	Quinshon Judkins	34 carries, 106 yards
Ole Miss	Receiving	Caden Prieskorn	10 receptions, 136 yards, 2 TD
Penn State	Passing	Drew Allar	19/39, 295 yards, 2 TD, 1 INT
Penn State	Rushing	Kaytron Allen	10 carries, 51 yards
Penn State	Receiving	Tyler Warren	5 receptions, 127 yards

== Statistics ==
=== Cumulative team statistics ===
Category	Ole Miss	Opponents
First downs – Avg. per game	305 – 23.46	265 – 20.38
Points – Avg. per game	456 – 35.08	293 – 22.54
Total plays/yards – Avg. per game	929/6007 (6.47 yards/play) – 71.46/462.1	910/4973 (5.46 yards/play) – 70/382.5
Passing yards – Avg. per game	3713 – 285.62	2983 – 229.46
Rushes/yards (net) – Avg. per game	535/2294 – 41.15/176.46 (4.29 yards/carry)	496/1990 – 38.15/153.08 (4.01 yards/carry)
Passing (Att-Comp-Int)	394–256–6 (64.97% completion)	414–252–13 (60.87% completion)
Sacks – Avg. per game	35 – 2.69	27 – 2.08
Penalties/yards – Avg. per game	94/768 – 7.23/59.08	73/621 – 5.62/47.77
3rd down conversions	65/176 (36.93%)	73/189 (38.62%)
4th down conversions	25/36 (69.44%)	12/29 (41.38%)
Time of possession – Avg. per game	6:00:32 – 27:44	6:59:28 – 32:16

=== Cumulative player statistics ===
Category	Player	Statistics – Avg. per game
Leading Passer	Jaxson Dart	233/358 (65.08% completion), 3364 yards, 23 TD, 5 INT – 17.92/27.54, 258.77 yards, 1.77 TD, 0.38 INT
Leading Rusher	Quinshon Judkins	271 carries, 1158 yards, 15 TD – 20.85 carries, 89.08 yards (4.27 yards/carry), 1.15 TD
Leading Receiver	Tre Harris	54 receptions, 985 yards, 8 TD – 4.15 receptions, 75.77 yards, 0.62 TD

== Coaching staff ==
Coach	Title	Year at Ole Miss	Previous job
Lane Kiffin	Head Coach	4th	Florida Atlantic
Charlie Weis Jr.	Co-OC/QB	2nd	South Florida (OC/QB)
Pete Golding	DC/LB	1st	Alabama (DC/LB)
Wes Neighbors III	S	1st	Maryland (S)
Randall Joyner	DL	3rd	SMU (DL)
Keynodo Hudson	CB	1st	Western Kentucky (CB)
John Garrison	OL	1st	NC State (OL)
John David Baker	Co-OC/TE	3rd	USC (TE)
Jake Schoonover	STC	1st	Arkansas State (STC)
Derrick Nix	AHC/WR	16th	Atlanta Falcons (OA)
Kevin Smith	RB	3rd	Miami (RB)

== Rankings ==
Ranking movements Legend: ██ Increase in ranking ██ Decrease in ranking
	Week															
Poll	Pre	1	2	3	4	5	6	7	8	9	10	11	12	13	14	Final
AP	22	20	17	15	20	16	13	13	12	11	10	13	12	11	11	9
Coaches	22	20	19	16	20	15	13	12	11	10	10	14	12	11	11	9
CFP	Not released									10	9	13	12	11	11	Not released
