= Jared Ivey =

American football player (born 2001)

No. 51 – Atlanta Falcons
- Position: Linebacker
- Roster status: Practice squad

Personal information
- Born: December 5, 2001 (age 24); Suwanee, Georgia, U.S.
- Listed height: 6 ft 6 in (1.98 m)
- Listed weight: 274 lb (124 kg)

Career information
- High school: North Gwinnett (Suwanee, Georgia)
- College: Georgia Tech (2020–2021); Ole Miss (2022–2024)
- NFL draft: 2025: undrafted

Career history
- Seattle Seahawks (2025); Atlanta Falcons (2026–present)

Awards and highlights
- Super Bowl champion (LX)
- Stats at Pro Football Reference

Jared Gavin Ivey (born December 5, 2001) is an American professional football linebacker for the Atlanta Falcons of the National Football League (NFL). He played college football for the Georgia Tech Yellow Jackets and Ole Miss Rebels.

== Early life ==
Ivey attended North Gwinnett High School in Suwanee, Georgia. During his high school career he had 153 tackles and 29 sacks, with 20 of the sacks coming during his senior season. He committed to Georgia Tech to play college football.

== College career ==
Ivey played at Georgia Tech in 2020 and 2021, starting 13 of 20 games and recording 40 tackles and 1.5 sacks. After the 2021 season, he transferred to the University of Mississippi. In his first year at Ole Miss in 2022, Ivey played in 13 games with seven starts and had 37 tackles and 3.5 sacks. In 2023, he started 12 of 13 games and had 46 tackles with 5.5 sacks and was named the Defensive MVP of the 2023 Peach Bowl. Ivey returned to Ole Miss in 2024.

== Professional career ==
Pre-draft measurables
Height	Weight	Arm length	Hand span	Wingspan	40-yard dash	10-yard split	20-yard split	20-yard shuttle	Three-cone drill	Vertical jump	Broad jump	Bench press
6 ft 5 7/8 in (1.98 m)	274 lb (124 kg)	33 1/2 in (0.85 m)	9 1/8 in (0.23 m)	6 ft 10 3/4 in (2.10 m)	5.15 s	1.84 s	3.02 s	4.68 s	7.56 s	30.5 in (0.77 m)	9 ft 5 in (2.87 m)	16 reps
All values from NFL Combine/Pro Day

=== Seattle Seahawks ===
Ivey signed with the Seattle Seahawks as an undrafted free agent on May 2, 2025.

On August 30, 2026, Ivey was waived by the Seahawks as a part of final roster cuts.

==== Atlanta Falcons ====
On August 31, 2026, Ivey was claimed off of waivers by the Atlanta Falcons. On November 2, he was waived and re-signed to the practice squad two days later.
