= Caden Prieskorn =

American football player (born 1999)

No. 41 – Cincinnati Bengals
- Position: Tight end
- Roster status: Practice squad

Personal information
- Born: September 21, 1999 (age 27); Lake Orion, Michigan, U.S.
- Listed height: 6 ft 5 in (1.96 m)
- Listed weight: 255 lb (116 kg)

Career information
- High school: Orchard Lake (Orchard Lake Village, Michigan)
- College: Memphis (2019–2022); Ole Miss (2023–2024)
- NFL draft: 2025: undrafted

Career history
- Detroit Lions (2025)*; Denver Broncos (2025)*; Tampa Bay Buccaneers (2025)*; Cleveland Browns (2025)*; Carolina Panthers (2026)*; Cincinnati Bengals (2026–present)*
- * Offseason or practice squad member only

Awards and highlights
- First-team All-AAC (2022); Second-team All-SEC (2023)
- Stats at Pro Football Reference

Caden Reed Prieskorn (PREES-korn; born September 21, 1999) is an American professional football tight end for the Cincinnati Bengals of the National Football League (NFL). He played college football for the Ole Miss Rebels and Memphis Tigers and was signed by the Detroit Lions as an undrafted free agent in 2025.

== Early life ==
Prieskorn attended Orchard Lake St. Mary’s High School in Orchard Lake Village, Michigan, where he played as a quarterback. As a junior, he led Orchard Lake to a state title, throwing for 200 yards and two touchdowns in the championship game. Following his time at Orchard Lake, Prieskorn enrolled at Fork Union Military Academy as a postgraduate before walking on at the University of Memphis.

== College career ==
=== Memphis ===
Upon arriving at Memphis, Prieskorn switched positions from quarterback to tight end. After redshirting in 2019 and playing sparingly the next two seasons, Prieskorn's production increased in 2022, recording 15 receptions and four touchdowns through the first four games. He finished the season tallying 48 receptions for 602 yards and seven touchdowns and was named a semifinalist for the John Mackey Award. Despite initial reports that Prieskorn would return to Memphis the following season, he entered the transfer portal.

=== Ole Miss ===
On January 9, 2023, Prieskorn announced that he would be transferring to the University of Mississippi to play for the Ole Miss Rebels. In his first season at Ole Miss, he recorded 20 receptions for 313 yards and two touchdowns. In the 2023 Peach Bowl, Prieskorn caught ten passes for a career-high 136 yards and two touchdowns, being named the game's Offensive MVP.

=== Statistics ===
Year	Team	Games	Receiving			
Year	Team	GP	Rec	Yards	Avg	TD
2020	Memphis	4	3	33	11.0	0
2021	Memphis	12	4	46	11.5	0
2022	Memphis	13	48	602	12.5	7
2023	Ole Miss	10	30	449	15.0	4
2024	Ole Miss	13	27	401	14.9	3
Career		52	112	1,531	13.7	14

== Professional career ==
Pre-draft measurables
Height	Weight	Arm length	Hand span	Wingspan	40-yard dash	10-yard split	20-yard split	20-yard shuttle	Three-cone drill	Vertical jump	Broad jump	Bench press
6 ft 5 7/8 in (1.98 m)	246 lb (112 kg)	33 in (0.84 m)	10 1/8 in (0.26 m)	6 ft 7 1/4 in (2.01 m)	4.78 s	1.65 s	2.75 s	4.54 s	7.19 s	31.0 in (0.79 m)	8 ft 11 in (2.72 m)	18 reps
All values from Pro Day

=== Detroit Lions ===
Prieskorn signed with the Detroit Lions as an undrafted free agent on May 9, 2025. He was waived by the Lions on May 12.

=== Denver Broncos ===
On June 3, 2025, Prieskorn signed with the Denver Broncos. On August 26, he was waived by the Broncos.

=== Tampa Bay Buccaneers ===
On September 23, 2025, Prieskorn was signed to the Tampa Bay Buccaneers' practice squad. He was released by the Buccaneers on October 14.

=== Cleveland Browns ===
On October 27, 2025, Prieskorn was signed to the Cleveland Browns' practice squad. He signed a reserve/future contract with Cleveland on January 5, 2026. On May 19, Prieskorn was waived by the Browns.

=== Carolina Panthers ===
On July 23, 2026, Prieskorn signed with the Carolina Panthers. He was waived by the Panthers as a part of preliminary roster cuts on August 29.

=== Cincinnati Bengals ===
On October 27, 2026, Prieskorn signed with the Cincinnati Bengals practice squad.
