= 2023 Utah State Aggies football team =

American college football season

2023 Utah State Aggies football

Famous Idaho Potato Bowl, L 22–45 vs. Georgia State
- Conference: Mountain West Conference
- Record: 6–7 (4–4 MW)
- Head coach: Blake Anderson (3rd season)
- Offensive coordinator: Kyle Cefalo (1st season)
- Offensive scheme: Spread option
- Defensive coordinator: Joe Cauthen (1st season)
- Base defense: 4–2–5
- Home stadium: Maverik Stadium

Uniform
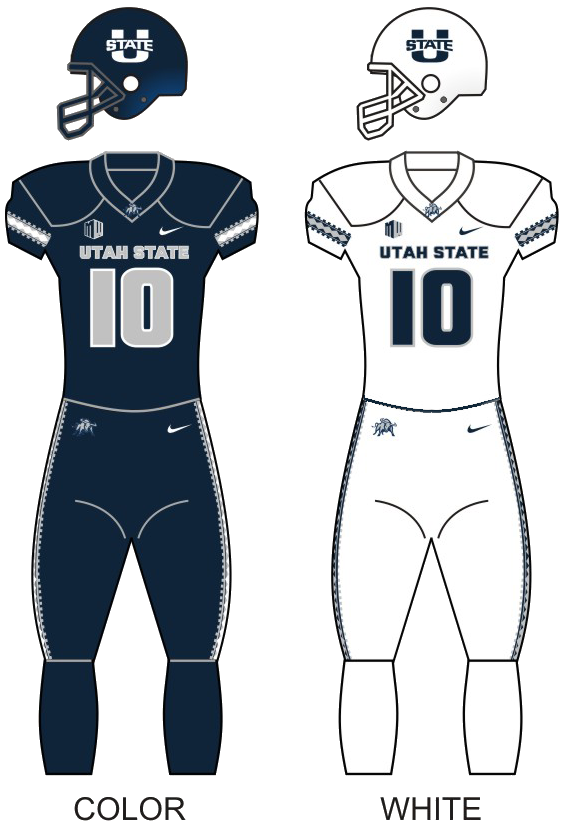

2023 Mountain West Conference football standings
	Conf.			Overall
Team	W		L	W		L
UNLV y	6	–	2	9	–	5
Boise State y$	6	–	2	8	–	6
San Jose State	6	–	2	7	–	6
Air Force	5	–	3	9	–	4
Wyoming	5	–	3	9	–	4
Fresno State	4	–	4	9	–	4
Utah State	4	–	4	6	–	7
Hawaii	3	–	5	5	–	8
Colorado State	3	–	5	5	–	7
Nevada	2	–	6	2	–	10
New Mexico	2	–	6	4	–	8
San Diego State	2	–	6	4	–	8
Championship: Boise State 44, UNLV 20
$ – Conference champion; y – Championship game participant

The 2023 Utah State Aggies football team represented Utah State University as a member of the Mountain Division of the Mountain West Conference during the 2023 NCAA Division I FBS football season. The Aggies were led by third-year head coach Blake Anderson and played their home games at Maverik Stadium in Logan, Utah. The Aggies drew an average home attendance of 19,282 in 2023.

== Schedule ==
Date	Time	Opponent	Site	TV	Result	Attendance
September 2	10:00 a.m.	at No. 25 Iowa*	Kinnick Stadium; Iowa City, IA	FS1	L 14–24	69,250
September 9	6:00 p.m.	Idaho State*	Maverik Stadium; Logan, UT	KJZZ	W 78–28	20,034
September 15	6:00 p.m.	at Air Force	Falcon Stadium; Colorado Springs, CO	CBSSN	L 21–39	46,692
September 23	6:00 p.m.	James Madison*	Maverik Stadium; Logan, UT	KJZZ	L 38–45	19,994
September 30	10:00 a.m.	at UConn*	Rentschler Field; East Hartford, CT	CBSSN	W 34–33	21,227
October 7	6:00 p.m.	Colorado State^{†}	Maverik Stadium; Logan, UT	KJZZ	W 44–24	22,864
October 13	6:00 p.m.	Fresno State	Maverik Stadium; Logan, UT	CBSSN	L 32–37	17,220
October 21	5:00 p.m.	at San Jose State	CEFCU Stadium; San Jose, CA	CBSSN	L 21–42	15,028
November 4	5:00 p.m.	at San Diego State	Snapdragon Stadium; San Diego, CA	FS1	W 32–24 ^{2OT}	23,096
November 11	1:00 p.m.	Nevada	Maverik Stadium; Logan, UT	KJZZ	W 41–24	17,760
November 18	5:00 p.m.	Boise State	Maverik Stadium; Logan, UT	CBSSN	L 10–45	17,821
November 24	1:30 p.m.	at New Mexico	University Stadium; Albuquerque, NM	CBSSN	W 44–41 ^{2OT}	12,094
December 23	1:30 p.m.	vs. Georgia State	Albertsons Stadium; Boise, ID (Famous Idaho Potato Bowl)	ESPN	L 22–45	12,168
*Non-conference game; ^{†}Homecoming; Rankings from AP Poll (and CFP Rankings, after November 7) - Released prior to game; All times are in Mountain time

== Game summaries ==
=== at No. 25 Iowa ===
Utah State Aggies (0-0) at No. 25 Iowa Hawkeyes - Game summary

Quarter	1	2	3	4	Total
Aggies	0	3	3	8	14
Hawkeyes	3	14	0	7	24

at Kinnick Stadium, Iowa City, IA

- Date: September 2
- Game time: 11:05 a.m. CDT
- Game weather: 80 °F (27 °C), Sunny, Wind SE 8 mph (13 km/h)
- Game attendance: 69,250
- Referee: Jeffrey Servinski
- TV announcers (FS1): Jeff Levering (play-by-play) and Mark Helfrich (analyst)

Game information

First quarter

- (14:18) IOWA – Seth Anderson 36-yard pass from Cade McNamara, Drew Stevens kick (Drive: 2 plays, 39 yards, 0:33; Iowa 7–0)
- (7:44) IOWA – Erick All 3-yard pass from Cade McNamara, Drew Stevens kick (Drive: 11 plays, 75 yards, 4:31; Iowa 14–0)

Second quarter

- (11:03) USU – William Testa 32-yard field goal (Drive: 16 plays, 56 yards, 5:59; Iowa 14–3)
- (0:07) IOWA – Drew Stevens 20-yard field goal (Drive: 11 plays, 47 yards, 3:47; Iowa 17–3)

Third quarter

- (12:02) USU – Elliott Nimrod 45-yard field goal (Drive: 7 plays, 47 yards, 2:58; Iowa 17–6)

Fourth quarter

- (10:17) IOWA – Kaleb Johnson 3-yard run, Drew Stevens kick (Drive: 10 plays, 68 yards, 4:43; Iowa 24–6)
- (1:36) USU – Terrell Vaughn 16-yard pass from Cooper Legas, Rahsul Faison pass from Cooper Legas (Drive: 3 plays, 70 yards, 0:31; Iowa 24–14)

Statistics	USU	IOWA
First downs	19	17
Total yards	329	284
Rushing yards	116	88
Passing yards	213	196
Turnovers	1	0
Time of possession	27:48	32:12

Team	Category	Player	Statistics
Utah State	Passing	Cooper Legas	32/48, 213 yards, TD, INT
Utah State	Rushing	Rahsul Faison	7 carries, 59 yards
Utah State	Receiving	Terrell Vaughn	12 receptions, 93 yards, TD
Iowa	Passing	Cade McNamara	17/30, 191 yards, 2 TD
Iowa	Rushing	Kaleb Johnson	19 carries, 63 yards, TD
Iowa	Receiving	Luke Lachey	7 receptions, 73 yards

=== Idaho State ===
Idaho State Bengals (0–1) at Utah State Aggies (0–1) – Game summary

Quarter	1	2	3	4	Total
Bengals	7	7	7	7	28
Aggies	7	44	14	13	78

at Maverik Stadium, Logan, Utah

- Date: September 9
- Game time: 6:00 p.m. MDT
- Game weather: Sunny, 78 °F (26 °C)
- Game attendance: 20,034
- Referee: Gary Leeper
- TV announcers (MW Network): Dave Fox (play-by-play), Alema Harrington (analyst), Frank Dolce (sideline)
- Spread: Utah State –24.0 • Odds to win: Utah State 90.4% •

Game information

First quarter

- 14:33 USU – Robert Briggs Jr. 58-yard run (William Testa kick) – Utah State 7–0, Drive: 2 plays, 65 yards, 0:27
- 10:59 ISU – Christian Fredericksen 9-yard pass from Jordan Cooke (Thomas Kopcho kick) – Tied 7–7, Drive: 7 plays, 75 yards, 3:34

Second quarter

- 14:51 USU – Davon Booth 8-yard run (William Testa kick) – Utah State 14–7, Drive: 8 plays, 80 yards, 2:40
- 12:09 USU – Davon Booth 40-yard run (William Testa kick) – Utah State 21–7, Drive: 3 plays, 67 yards, 1:25
- 6:35 USU – Terrell Vaughn 4-yard pass from Cooper Legas (William Testa kick) – Utah State 28–7, Drive: 11 plays, 75 yards, 4:02
- 5:44 USU – Ike Larsen 47-yard interception return (two–point run conversion failed) – Utah State 34–7, Drive: 3 plays, 20 yards, 0:51
- 5:24 USU – Jalen Royals 20-yard pass from Cooper Legas (Elliott Nimrod kick) – Utah State 41–7, Drive: 1 play, 20 yards, 0:07
- 4:08 USU – Rahsul Faison 60-yard run (Elliott Nimrod kick) – Utah State 48–7, Drive: 2 plays, 60 yards, 0:19
- 0:16 ISU – Christian Fredericksen 15–yard pass from Hunter Hays (Thomas Kopcho kick) – Utah State 48–14, Drive: 10 plays, 75 yards, 3:52
- 0:01 USU – Elliott Nimrod 37-yard field goal – Utah State 51–14, Drive: 1 play, 0 yards, 0:05

Third quarter

- 8:58 USU – Terrell Vaughn 5-yard pass from Levi Williams (Elliott Nimrod kick) – Utah State 58–14, Drive: 11 plays, 62 yards, 3:48
- 3:58 USU – Micah Davis 47-yard pass from Levi Williams (Elliott Nimrod kick) – Utah State 65–14, Drive: 2 plays, 46 yards, 0:32
- 0:00 ISU – Michael Shulikov 12-yard pass from Hunter Hays (Thomas Kopcho kick) – Utah State 65–21, Drive: 11 plays, 75 yards, 3:58

Fourth quarter

- 9:15 ISU – Raiden Hunter 1-yard run (Thomas Kopcho kick) – Utah State 65–28, Drive: 13 plays, 77 yards, 4:34
- 4:25 USU – Cooper Jones 1-yard run (Elliott Nimrod PAT failed) – Utah State 71–28, Drive: 11 plays, 63 yards, 4:44
- 0:54 USU – Jaiden Francois 75-yard interception return (Elliott Nimrod kick) – Utah State 78–28, Drive: 8 plays, 40 yards, 3:23

Statistics	Idaho State	Utah State
First downs	28	23
Plays–yards	83–424	69–591
Rushes–yards	30–101	41–380
Passing yards	323	211
Passing: comp–att–int	34–53–2	22–28–0
Turnovers	3	0
Time of possession	33:27	26:33

Team	Category	Player	Statistics
Idaho State	Passing	Jordan Cooke	20/30, 185 yards, 1 TD, 1 INT
Idaho State	Rushing	Soujah Gasu	6 carries, 30 yards
Idaho State	Receiving	Christian Fredericksen	8 receptions, 116 yards, 2 TD
Utah State	Passing	Cooper Legas	14/16, 125 yards, 2 TD
Utah State	Rushing	Robert Briggs Jr.	9 carries, 101 yards, 1 TD
Utah State	Receiving	Terrell Vaughn	11 receptions, 73 yards, 2 TD

=== at Air Force ===
Utah State Aggies (1–1) vs Air Force Falcons (2–0)

Quarter	1	2	3	4	Total
Aggies	0	7	7	7	21
Falcons	22	10	7	0	39

at Falcon Stadium, Colorado Springs, CO

- Date: September 15, 2023
- Game time: 6:00 p.m. MDT
- Game weather: Cloudy
- Game attendance: 18,400
- Referee: Patrick Foy
- TV announcers (CBSSN): Alex Del Barrio (Play-by-play), Robert Turbin (Analyst), & Emily Proud (Color)
- ESPN – Michel runs for three TDs, leads Air Force over Utah State 39-21

Game information

First quarter

- (07:04) AF TD – Emmanuel Michel 1-yard rush, Emmanuel Michel rush
  Drive: 12 plays, 63 yards, 6:57; Air Force 8–0
- (05:17) AF TD – Zac Larrier 4-yard rush, Matthew Dapore kick
  Drive: 3 plays, 11 yards, 1:16; Air Force 15–0
- (00:11) AF TD – Emmanuel Michel 2-yard rush, Matthew Dapore kick
  Drive: 7 plays, 79 yards, 4:00; Air Force 22–0

Second quarter

- (11:15) AF TD – John Lee Eldridge III 13-yard rush, Matthew Dapore kick
  Drive: 5 plays, 72 yards, 2:48; Air Force 29–0
- (01:58) USU TD – McCae Hillstead 2-yard pass to Terrell Vaughn, Elliott Nimrod kick
  Drive: 11 plays, 57 yards, 4:38; Air Force 29–7
- (00:00) AF FG – Matthew Dapore 49-yard field goal
  Drive: 8 plays, 43 yards, 1:58; Air Force 32–7

Third quarter

- (08:45) AF TD – Emmanuel Michel 2-yard rush, Matthew Dapore kick
  Drive: 10 plays, 46 yards, 6:14; Air Force 39–7
- (05:10) USU TD – McCae Hillstead 9-yard pass to Jalen Royals, Elliott Nimrod kick
  Drive: 10 plays, 79 yards, 3:28; Air Force 39–14

Fourth quarter

- (08:43) USU TD – McCae Hillstead 6-yard pass to Micah Davis, Elliott Nimrod kick
  Drive: 7 plays, 65 yards, 2:02; Air Force 39–21

Passing

- USU – McCae Hillstead: 18/27, 202 yards, 3 TD
- AF – Zac Larrier: 3/4, 84 yards

Rushing

- USU – Rahsul Faison: 7 carries, 40 yards
- AF – Owen Burk: 15 carries, 110 yards

Receiving

- USU – Micah Davis: 8 receptions, 84 yards, 1 TD
- AF – Jared Roznos: 1 reception, 49 yards

Defense

- USU – Ike Larsen: 11 total tackles (5 solo, 6 assisted)
- AF – Alec Mock: 11 total tackles (8 solo, 3 assisted), 2 sacks, 2 tackles for loss, 1 passes defended

Statistics	USU	AF
First downs	20	24
3rd down efficiency	3–11	9–13
4th down efficiency	2–3	1–1
Plays–yards	61–302	68–428
Rushes–yards	26–54	64–344
Passing yards	248	84
Passing: Comp–Att–Int	20–35–1	3–4–0
Penalties–yards	4–17	6–60
Turnovers	2	0
Time of possession	21:20	38:40

=== at UConn ===
Utah State Aggies at UConn Huskies – Game summary

Quarter	1	2	3	4	Total
Aggies	0	7	17	10	34
Huskies	7	10	0	16	33

at Pratt & Whitney Stadium at Rentschler Field, East Hartford, Connecticut

- Date: September 30
- Game time: 12:03 p.m. EDT
- Game weather: Cloudy, Wind N 8MPH, 60 °F (16 °C)
- Game attendance: 21,227
- Referee: Marcus Woods
- TV announcers (CBSSN): Chris Lewis (play-by-play), Ross Tucker (color analyst), Keiana Martin (sideline)

Game information
First quarter
- UCONN – Stafford, Jelani 1 yd run (McFadden, Joe kick), 1:14. Huskies 7–0. Drive: 12 plays, 80 yards, TOP 07:49

Second quarter

- UCONN – Harris, Nick 4 yd pass from Roberson, Ta'Quan (McFadden, Joe kick), 14:12. Huskies 14–0. Drive: 4 plays, 24 yards, TOP 01:38
- UCONN – McFadden, Joe 36 yd field goal, 0:37. Huskies 17–0. Drive: 13 plays, 48 yards, TOP 05:27
- USU – Bowman, Colby 63 yd pass from Hillstead, McCae (Nimrod, Elliott kick), 0:14. Huskies 17–7. Drive: 2 plays, 75 yards, TOP 00:23

Third quarter

- USU – Royals, Jalen 15 yd pass from Legas, Cooper (Nimrod, Elliott kick), 12:21. Huskies 17–14. Drive: 8 plays, 88 yards, TOP 02:39
- USU – Nimrod, Elliott 37 yd field goal, 6:56. Tied 17–17. Drive: 9 plays, 48 yards, TOP 03:47
- USU – Royals, Jalen 71 yd pass from Legas, Cooper (Nimrod, Elliott kick), 3:52. Aggies 24–17. Drive: 3 plays, 88 yards, TOP 00:56

Fourth quarter

- UCONN – Porter, Geordon 28 yd pass from Roberson, Ta'Quan (McFadden, Joe kick), 14:17. Tied 24–24. Drive: 8 plays, 88 yards, TOP 04:30
- USU – Royals, Jalen 52 yd pass from Legas, Cooper (Nimrod, Elliott kick), 12:36. Aggies 31–24. Drive: 5 plays, 75 yards, TOP 01:41
- UCONN - McFadden, Joe 38 yd field goal, 10:29. Aggies 31–27. Drive: 6 plays, 55 yards, TOP 02:07
- USU – Nimrod, Elliott 24 yd field goal, 5:20. Aggies 34–27. Drive: 12 plays, 69 yards, TOP 05:04
- UCONN – Stafford, Jelani 1 yd run (kick blocked), 0:40. Aggies 34–33. Drive: 9 plays, 85 yards, TOP 02:01

Statistics

Statistics	USU	CONN
First downs	21	26
Total yards	416	473
Rushing yards	101	218
Passing yards	315	255
Turnovers	2	1
Time of possession	21:31	38:29

Team	Category	Player	Statistics
Utah State	Passing	Cooper Legas	11/13, 204 yds, 3 TDs
Utah State	Rushing	Cooper Legas	6 att, 26 yds
Utah State	Receiving	Jalen Royals	7 rec, 185 yds, 3 TDs
Utah State	Defense	MJ Tafisi	13 tackles
UConn	Passing	Ta'Quan Roberson	23/32, 255 yds, 2 TDs
UConn	Rushing	Victor Rosa	15 att, 92 yds
UConn	Receiving	Cameron Ross	7 rec, 70 yds
UConn	Defense	Jackson Mitchell	15 tackles, 1 int

=== Colorado State ===
Colorado State Rams (2–2) at Utah State Aggies (2–3) – Game summary

Quarter	1	2	3	4	Total
Rams	17	0	0	7	24
Aggies	3	14	14	13	44

at Maverik Stadium • Logan, Utah

- Date: October 7th
- Game time: 6:00 p.m. MST/5:00 p.m. PST
- Game weather: Sunny
- Game attendance: 22,864
- Referee: Michael Cuttone
- TV announcers (MW Network): TBD

Game information

First quarter

Second quarter

Third quarter

Fourth quarter

Statistics	Colorado State	Utah State
First downs	20	28
Plays–yards	83–320	84–639
Rushes–yards	26–95	55–252
Passing yards	225	387
Passing: comp–att–int	26–57–3	19–29–2
Time of possession	27:10	32:50

Team	Category	Player	Statistics
Colorado State	Passing	Brayden Fowler-Nicolosi	26/57, 225 yards, 3 INT
Colorado State	Rushing	Kobe Johnson	17 carries, 56 yards, TD
Colorado State	Receiving	Louis Brown IV	6 receptions, 54 yards
Utah State	Passing	Cooper Legas	19/29, 387 yards, 4 TD, 2 INT
Utah State	Rushing	Davon Booth	14 carries, 141 yards, 2 TD
Utah State	Receiving	Terrell Vaughn	8 receptions, 143 yards, TD

=== Fresno State ===
Game Seven – Fresno State Bulldogs (5–1) at Utah State Aggies (3–3)

Quarter	1	2	3	4	Total
Bulldogs	7	7	14	9	37
Aggies	7	7	3	15	32

at Maverik Stadium • Logan, Utah

- Date: Saturday, October 13, 2023
- Game time: 5:00 p.m. PDT
- Game weather: Cloudy • Temperature: 57 °F (14 °C) • Wind:
- Game attendance: 17,220
- Referee: Christian Watson
- TV announcers (CBSSN): Chris Lewis (play-by-play) & Donte Whitner (analyst)

Game information

First quarter

- (6:19) FRES – Malik Sherrod 5-yard run, Dylan Lynch kick (Drive: 14 plays, 98 yards, 5:19; Fresno State 7–0)
- (3:42) USU – Jalen Royals 29-yard pass from Cooper Legas, Elliott Nimrod kick (Drive: 10 plays, 75 yards, 2:37; Tied 7–7)

Second quarter

- (2:45) FRES – Tre Watson 7-yard pass from Logan Fife, Dylan Lynch kick (Drive: 11 plays, 45 yards, 3:57; Fresno State 14–7)
- (1:00) USU – Jalen Royals 52-yard pass from Cooper Legas, Elliott Nimrod kick (Drive: 7 plays, 75 yards, 1:45; Tied 14–14)

Third quarter

- (11:37) USU – Elliott Nimrod 37-yard field goal (Drive: 8 plays, 55 yards, 3:23; Utah State 17–14)
- (9:51) FRES – Malik Sherrod 46-yard run, Dylan Lynch kick (Drive: 4 plays, 57 yards, 1:45; Fresno State 21–17)
- (4:51) FRES – Tre Watson 7-yard pass from Jaelen Gill, Dylan Lynch kick (Drive: 6 plays, 66 yards, 2:13; Fresno State 28–17)

Fourth quarter

- (14:29) USU – Terrell Vaughn 43-yard pass from Cooper Legas, Jalen Royals two–point run (Drive: 5 plays, 69 yards, 1:16; Fresno State 28–25)
- (9:50) FRES – Dylan Lynch 26-yard field goal (Drive: 10 plays, 64 yards, 4:33; Fresno State 31–25)
- (4:42) USU – Rahsul Faison 24-yard run, Elliott Nimrod kick (Drive: 5 plays, 85 yards, 2:00; Utah State 32–31)
- (2:19) FRES – Malik Sherrod 11-yard run, two–point conversion failed (Drive: 5 plays, 72 yards, 2:16; Fresno State 37–32)

Statistics	FRES	USU
First downs	27	30
Plays–yards	80–461	82–568
Rushes–yards	40–151	42–205
Passing yards	310	363
Passing: comp–att–int	23–40–0	23–40–2
Time of possession	33:09	26:51

Team	Category	Player	Statistics
Fresno State	Passing	Logan Fife	22/39, 291 yards, TD
Fresno State	Rushing	Malik Sherrod	24 carries, 131 yards, 3 TD
Fresno State	Receiving	Tre Watson	5 receptions, 76 yards, 2 TD
Utah State	Passing	Cooper Legas	23/40, 363 yards, 3 TD, 2 INT
Utah State	Rushing	Rahsul Faison	12 carries, 75 yards, TD
Utah State	Receiving	Jalen Royals	7 receptions, 125 yards, 2 TD

=== at San Jose State ===
Utah State Aggies (3–4) at San Jose State Spartans (2–5)

Quarter	1	2	3	4	Total
Aggies	0	0	0	0	0
Spartans	0	0	0	0	0

at CEFCU Stadium, San Jose, CA

- Date: October 21, 2023
- Game time: 4:00 p.m. PST
- TV: CBSSN

Game information

First Quarter
Second Quarter
Third Quarter
Fourth Quarter

Win Probability

Line

Over/Under

Statistics	USU	SJSU
First downs		
Total yards		
Rushing yards		
Passing yards		
Turnovers		
Time of possession		

Team	Category	Player	Statistics
Utah State	Passing		
Utah State	Rushing		
Utah State	Receiving		
SJSU	Passing		
SJSU	Rushing		
SJSU	Receiving		

=== at San Diego State ===
Utah State Aggies (3–5) vs. San Diego State Aztecs (3–5)

Quarter	1	2	3	4	OT	2OT	Total
Aggies	0	3	7	7	7	8	32
Aztecs	0	7	0	10	7	0	24

at Snapdragon Stadium, San Diego, California

- Date: November 4
- Game time: 4:00 p.m. PDT
- Game weather: Sunny, Temperature: 78 °F (26 °C), Wind: N 9 mph
- Game attendance: 23,096
- Referee: Cal McNeill
- TV announcers (FS1): Guy Haberman (play-by-play) and Petros Papadakis (analyst)

Game information

First Quarter

None

Second Quarter

- (14:10) SDSU - Mark Redman 9 yard pass from Jalen Mayden (Jack Browning kick); 6 plays, 88 yards, 3:18 (San Diego State 7-0)
- (10:14) USU - William Testa 24 yard field goal; 14 yards, 68 yards, 3:56 (San Diego State 7-3)

Third Quarter

- (8:43) USU - Jalen Royals 50 yard pass from Cooper Legas (William Testa kick); 9 plays, 73 yards, 3:43 (Utah State 10-7)

Fourth Quarter

- (13:40) USU - Davon Booth 19 yard run (William Testa kick); 7 plays, 92 yards, 2:25 (Utah State 17-7)
- (7:10) SDSU - Kenan Christon 10 yard pass from Jalen Mayden (Jack Browning kick); 9 plays, 79 yards, 4:08 (Utah State 17-14)
- (0:33) SDSU - Jack Browning 23 yard field goal; 9 plays, 49 yards, 1:54 (Tied 17-17)

First Overtime

- SDSU - Brionne Penny 27 yard pass from Jalen Mayden (Jack Browning kick); 2 plays, 25 yards (San Diego State 24-17)
- USU - Terrell Vaughn 18 yard pass from Cooper Legas (William Testa kick); 3 plays, 25 yards (Tied 24-24)

Second Overtime

- USU - Robert Briggs Jr. 20 yard run (Terrell Vaughn pass to Broc Lane for two-point conversion); 2 plays, 25 yards (Utah State 32-24)

Statistics	Utah State	San Diego State
First downs	20	17
Plays–yards	76–400	71–384
Rushes–yards	44–171	31–121
Passing yards	229	263
Passing: comp–att–int	23–32–0	26–40–1
Time of possession	28:30	31:30

Team	Category	Player	Statistics
Utah State	Passing	Cooper Legas	11–15, 167 yards, 2 TD
Utah State	Rushing	Davon Booth	13 carries, 77 yards, 1 TD
Utah State	Receiving	Terrell Vaughn	8 receptions, 91 yards, 1 TD
San Diego State	Passing	Jalen Mayden	25–39, 265 yards, 3 TD, 1 INT
San Diego State	Rushing	Lucky Sutton	11 carries, 86 yards
San Diego State	Receiving	Kenan Christon	8 receptions, 76 yards, 1 TD

=== vs. Georgia State (Famous Idaho Potato Bowl) ===
Game Thirteen – Georgia State Panthers (6–6) vs Utah State Aggies (6–6) (Famous Idaho Potato Bowl)

Quarter	1	2	3	4	Total
Panthers	21	10	7	7	45
Aggies	14	0	0	8	22

at Albertsons Stadium • Boise, Idaho

- Date: December 23, 2023
- Game time: 3:30 p.m. EST
- Game weather: Sunny • Temperature: 39 °F (4 °C) • Wind: 15 mph (24 km/h) NW
- Game attendance: 12,168
- Referee: Jeremy Valentine
- TV announcers (ESPN): Chris Cotter (play-by-play), Mark Herzlich (analyst), and Morgan Uber (sideline)
- Box score

Game information

First quarter

- (7:36) GSU – Darren Grainger 1 yard run, Liam Rickman kick (Drive: 10 plays, 68 yards, 4:34; Georgia State 7–0)
- (6:15) USU – Jalen Royals 35 yard pass from Levi Williams, Elliott Nimrod kick (Drive: 4 plays, 50 yards, 1:21; Tied 7–7)
- (3:57) GSU – Darren Grainger 1 yard run, Liam Rickman kick (Drive: 5 plays, 75 yards, 2:18; Georgia State 14–7)
- (3:41) USU – Davon Booth 65 yard run, Elliott Nimrod kick (Drive: 2 plays, 65 yards, 0:16; Tied 14–14)
- (0:15) GSU – Tailique Williams 27 yard pass from Darren Grainger, Liam Rickman kick (Drive: 7 plays, 75 yards, 3:26; Georgia State 21–14)

Second quarter

- (7:30) GSU – Liam Rickman 31 yard field goal (Drive: 4 plays, -3 yards, 1:32; Georgia State 24–14)
- (1:17) GSU – Cadarrius Thompson 23 yard pass from Darren Grainger, Liam Rickman kick (Drive: 9 plays, 80 yards, 3:20; Georgia State 31–14)

Third quarter

- (6:02) GSU – Cadarrius Thompson 37 yard pass from Darren Grainger, Liam Rickman kick (Drive: 9 plays, 80 yards, 4:26; Georgia State 38–14)

Fourth Q=quarter

- (9:18) GSU – Freddie Brock 5 yard run, Liam Rickman kick (Drive: 5 plays, 71 yards, 2:54; Georgia State 45–14)
- (4:48) USU – Terrell Vaughn 2 yard pass from McCae Hillstead, Jalen Royals two-point pass conversion from McCae Hillstead (Drive: 11 plays, 75 yards, 4:30; Georgia State 45–22)

Win Probability

Line

Over/Under

Statistics	GSU	USU
First downs	24	18
Total yards	643	347
Rushing yards	386	159
Passing yards	257	188
Turnovers	1	1
Time of possession	36:12	23:48

Team	Category	Player	Statistics
Georgia State	Passing	Darren Grainger	19/22, 257 yards, 3 TD
Georgia State	Rushing	Freddie Brock	24 carries, 276 yards, TD
Georgia State	Receiving	Cadarrius Thompson	5 receptions, 117 yards, 2 TD
Utah State	Passing	Levi Williams	12/21, 131 yards, TD, INT
Utah State	Rushing	Davon Booth	4 carries, 71 yards, TD
Utah State	Receiving	Terrell Vaughn	8 receptions, 86 yards, TD
