= 2023 UConn Huskies football team =

American college football season

2023 UConn Huskies football
- Conference: Independent
- Record: 3–9
- Head coach: Jim L. Mora (2nd season)
- Offensive coordinator: Nick Charlton (2nd season)
- Offensive scheme: Multiple
- Base defense: 4–3
- Home stadium: Pratt & Whitney Stadium at Rentschler Field

2023 NCAA Division I FBS independents football records
	Conf.			Overall
Team	W		L	W		L
No. 14 Notre Dame		–		10	–	3
Army		–		6	–	6
UConn		–		3	–	9
UMass		–		3	–	9
Rankings from AP Poll

The 2023 UConn Huskies football team represented the University of Connecticut (UConn) an independent during the 2023 NCAA Division I FBS football season. Led by second-year head coach Jim L. Mora, the Huskies compiled a record of 3–9. The team played home games at Pratt & Whitney Stadium at Rentschler Field in East Hartford, Connecticut.

The Huskies football team drew an average home attendance of 24,659 in 2023.

== Schedule ==
UConn announced their 2023 football schedule on December 22, 2022. The Huskies schedule featured six home games and six away games.

Date	Time	Opponent	Site	TV	Result	Attendance
August 31	7:30 p.m.	NC State	Pratt & Whitney Stadium at Rentschler Field; East Hartford, CT	CBSSN	L 14–24	36,526
September 9	7:00 p.m.	at Georgia State	Center Parc Stadium; Atlanta, GA	ESPN+	L 14–35	15,186
September 16	3:30 p.m.	FIU	Pratt & Whitney Stadium at Rentschler Field; East Hartford, CT	CBSSN	L 17–24	20,405
September 23	3:30 p.m.	No. 18 Duke	Pratt & Whitney Stadium at Rentschler Field; East Hartford, CT	CBSSN	L 7–41	29,033
September 30	12:00 p.m.	Utah State	Pratt & Whitney Stadium at Rentschler Field; East Hartford, CT	CBSSN	L 33–34	21,227
October 7	5:00 p.m.	at Rice	Rice Stadium; Houston, TX	ESPN+	W 38–31	21,207
October 21	3:30 p.m.	South Florida^{†}	Pratt & Whitney Stadium at Rentschler Field; East Hartford, CT	CBSSN	L 21–24	21,704
October 28	12:00 p.m.	at Boston College	Alumni Stadium; Chestnut Hill, MA	ACCN	L 14–21	36,902
November 4	12:00 p.m.	at No. 17 Tennessee	Neyland Stadium; Knoxville, TN	SECN	L 3–59	101,915
November 11	2:00 p.m.	at James Madison	Bridgeforth Stadium; Harrisonburg, VA	ESPN+	L 6–44	25,240
November 18	12:00 p.m.	Sacred Heart	Pratt & Whitney Stadium at Rentschler Field; East Hartford, CT	WFSB	W 31–3	19,053
November 25	12:00 p.m.	at UMass	Warren McGuirk Alumni Stadium; Hadley, MA (rivalry)	ESPN+	W 31–18	12,291
^{†}Homecoming; Rankings from AP Poll (and CFP Rankings, after November 1) - Released prior to game; All times are in Eastern time

== Game summaries ==
=== NC State ===
NC State Wolfpack at UConn Huskies – Game summary

Quarter	1	2	3	4	Total
Wolfpack	7	3	14	0	24
Huskies	7	0	7	0	14

at Pratt & Whitney Stadium at Rentschler Field, East Hartford, Connecticut

- Date: August 31
- Game time: 7:32 p.m. EDT
- Game weather: Sunny, 76 °F (24 °C)
- Game attendance: 36,526
- Referee: Stuart Mullins
- TV announcers (CBSSN): Ed Cohen (play-by-play), Christian Fauria (color analyst), and Keiana Martin (sideline)
- Box score, Recap

Game information
First quarter
- CONN – Victor Rosa 18-yard run (Joe McFadden kick), 8:21. Huskies 7–0. Drive: 12 plays, 75 yards, 6:39.
- NCSU – Brennan Armstrong 4-yard run (Brayden Narveson kick), 3:48. Tied 7–7. Drive: 9 plays, 66 yards, 4:27.

Second quarter

- NCSU – Brayden Narveson 44-yard field goal, 0:00. Wolfpack 10–7. Drive: 12 plays, 59 yards, 2:56.

Third quarter

- NCSU – Delbert Mims III 1-yard run (Brayden Narveson kick), 2:22. Wolfpack 17–7. Drive: 11 plays, 91 yards, 6:27.
- CONN – Victor Rosa 71-yard run (Joe McFadden kick), 2:04. Wolfpack 17–14. Drive: 1 play, 56 yards, 0:11.
- NCSU – Brennan Armstrong 8-yard run (Brayden Narveson kick), 0:34. Wolfpack 24–14. Drive: 4 plays, 27 yards, 1:20.

Fourth quarter

- No scoring plays

Statistics

Statistics	NCSU	CONN
First downs	23	15
Total yards	364	273
Rushing yards	209	160
Passing yards	155	113
Turnovers	0	1
Time of possession	34:00	26:00

Team	Category	Player	Statistics
NC State	Passing	Brennan Armstrong	17/26, 155 yards
NC State	Rushing	Brennan Armstrong	19 carries, 96 yards, 2 TD
NC State	Receiving	Kevin Concepcion	4 receptions, 36 yards
NC State	Defense	Payton Wilson	10 tackles, 1 INT
UConn	Passing	Joseph Fagnano	14/26, 113 yards, INT
UConn	Rushing	Victor Rosa	9 carries, 99 yards, 2 TD
UConn	Receiving	Justin Joly	4 receptions, 38 yards
UConn	Defense	Jackson Mitchell	15 tackles

=== At Georgia State ===
UConn Huskies at Georgia State Panthers – Game summary

Quarter	1	2	3	4	Total
Huskies	0	0	0	14	14
Panthers	7	14	7	7	35

at Center Parc Stadium, Atlanta, Georgia

- Date: September 9
- Game time: 7:02 p.m. EDT
- Game weather: Sunny, 80 °F (27 °C)
- Game attendance: 15,186
- Referee: Scott Broadway
- TV announcers (ESPN+): Matt Stewart (play-by-play) and Sam Crenshaw (color analyst)
- Box Score

Game information
First quarter
- GSU – Grainger, Darren 65 yd run (Rickman, Liam kick), 8:40. Panthers 7–0. Drive: 4 plays, 82 yards, TOP 01:37

Second quarter

- GSU – Lewis, Robert 9 yd pass from Grainger, Darren (Rickman, Liam kick), 5:22. Panthers 14–0. Drive: 6 plays, 46 yards, TOP 01:41
- GSU – Carroll, Marcus 2 yd run (Rickman, Liam kick), 0:23. Panthers 21–0. Drive: 9 plays, 63 yards, TOP 02:54

Third quarter

- GSU – Carroll, Marcus 3 yd run (Rickman, Liam kick), 4:07. Panthers 28–0. Drive: 15 plays, 92 yards, TOP 07:30

Fourth quarter

- UCONN – Clercius, Kevens 11 yd pass from Roberson, Ta'Quan (McFadden, Joe kick), 9:16. Panthers 28–7. Drive: 10 plays, 76 yards, TOP 03:05
- GSU – Carroll, Marcus 39 yd run (Rickman, Liam kick), 6:26. Panthers 35–7. Drive: 1 plays, 39 yards, TOP 00:07
- UCONN – Buckman, Brett 32 yd pass from Roberson, Ta'Quan (McFadden, Joe kick), 3:57. Panthers 35–14. Drive: 8 plays, 80 yards, TOP 02:29

Statistics

Statistics	CONN	GAST
First downs	19	19
Total yards	326	394
Rushing yards	50	250
Passing yards	276	144
Turnovers	3	1
Time of possession	32:32	27:28

Team	Category	Player	Statistics
UConn	Passing	Ta'Quan Roberson	19/30, 216 yds, 2 TDs, 1 INT
UConn	Rushing	Victor Rosa	10 att, 17 yds
UConn	Receiving	Brett Buckman	9 rec, 93 yds, 1 TD
UConn	Defense	Noah Plack	13 tackles
Georgia State	Passing	Darren Grainger	15/26, 144 yds, 1 TD
Georgia State	Rushing	Darren Grainger	12 att, 145 yds, 1 TD
Georgia State	Receiving	Ja'Cyais Credle	3 rec, 45 yds
Georgia State	Defense	Jontrey Hunter	8 tackles

=== FIU ===
FIU Panthers at UConn Huskies – Game summary

Quarter	1	2	3	4	Total
Panthers	7	17	0	0	24
Huskies	3	0	7	7	17

at Pratt & Whitney Stadium at Rentschler Field, East Hartford, Connecticut

- Date: September 16
- Game time: 3:30 p.m. EDT
- Game weather: Cloudy, Wind NW 14 MPH, 72 °F (22 °C)
- Game attendance: 20,405
- Referee: Art Brown
- TV announcers (CBSSN): Dave Ryan (play-by-play), Christian Fauria (color analyst), and Keiana Martin (sideline)
- Box Score

Game information
First quarter
- FIU – Jenkins, Keyone 1 yd run (Gabriel, Chase kick), 12:27. Panthers 7–0. Drive: 6 plays, 75 yards, TOP 02:33
- UCONN – McFadden, Joe 26 yd field goal, 5:49. Panthers 7–3. Drive: 13 plays, 71 yards, TOP 06:32

Second quarter

- FIU – Gabriel, Chase 27 yd field goal, 14:58. Panthers 10–3. Drive: 5 plays, 54 yards, TOP 01:35
- FIU – Bracey, Jalen 45 yd pass from Jenkins, Keyone (Gabriel, Chase kick), 11:46. Panthers 17–3. Drive: 3 plays, 44 yards, TOP 01:37
- FIU – Mitchell, Kris 64 yd pass from Jenkins, Keyone (Gabriel, Chase kick), 0:47. Panthers 24–3. Drive: 3 plays, 80 yards, TOP 00:25

Third quarter

- UCONN – Stafford, Jelani 1 yd run (McFadden, Joe kick), 11:32. Panthers 24–10. Drive: 8 plays, 82 yards, TOP 03:23

Fourth quarter

- UCONN – Houston, Devontae 37 yd pass from Roberson, Ta'Quan (McFadden, Joe kick), 14:04. Panthers 24–17. Drive: 4 plays, 56 yards, TOP 01:13

Statistics

Statistics	FIU	CONN
First downs	16	20
Total yards	364	343
Rushing yards	80	173
Passing yards	284	170
Turnovers	0	0
Time of possession	27:42	32:18

Team	Category	Player	Statistics
FIU	Passing	Keyone Jenkins	15/27, 284 yds, 2 TDs
FIU	Rushing	Shomari Lawrence	9 Att, 37 yds
FIU	Receiving	Jalen Bracey	5 Rec, 90 yds, 1 TD
FIU	Defense	Donovan Manuel	10 tackles
UConn	Passing	Ta'Quan Roberson	15/32, 170 yds, 1 TD
UConn	Rushing	Devontae Houston	19 Att, 126 yds
UConn	Receiving	Brett Buckman	5 Rec, 62 yds
UConn	Defense	Jackson Mitchell	8 tackles

=== No. 18 Duke ===
No. 18 Duke Blue Devils at UConn Huskies – Game summary

Quarter	1	2	3	4	Total
No. 18 Blue Devils	7	20	14	0	41
Huskies	0	0	0	7	7

at Pratt & Whitney Stadium at Rentschler Field, East Hartford, Connecticut

- Date: September 23
- Game time: 3:32 p.m. EDT
- Game weather: Rain, Wind NE 12MPH, 61 °F (16 °C)
- Game attendance: 29,033
- Referee: Jerry Magallanes
- TV announcers (CBSSN): Chris Lewis (play-by-play), Robert Turbin (color analyst), and Keiana Martin (sideline)
- Box Score

Game information
First quarter
- DUKE – Waters, Jordan 1 yd run (Pelino, Todd kick), 6.16. Blue Devils 7–0. Drive: 5 plays, 44 yards, TOP 01:58

Second quarter

- DUKE – Pelino, Todd 50 yd field goal, 12:42. Blue Devils 10–0. Drive: 13 plays, 63 yards, TOP 06:32
- DUKE – Waters, Jordan 10 yd run (Pelino, Todd kick), 12:25. Blue Devils 17–0. Drive: 1 plays, 10 yards, TOP 00:05
- DUKE – Leonard, Riley 3 yd run (Pelino, Todd kick), 4:55. Blue Devils 24–0. Drive: 9 plays, 49 yards, TOP 04:03
- DUKE – Pelino, Todd 40 yd field goal, 0:00. Blue Devils 27–0. Drive: 6 plays, 38 yards, TOP 00:34

Third quarter

- DUKE – Carter, DeWayne 26 yd fumble recovery (Pelino, Todd kick), 7:13. Blue Devils 34–0.
- DUKE – Moore, Jordan 22 yd pass from Leonard, Riley (Pelino, Todd kick), 3:01. Blue Devils 41–0. Drive: 5 plays, 60 yards, TOP 03:07

Fourth quarter

- UCONN – Roberson, Ta'Quan 2 yd run (Ruelas, Noe kick), 0:12. Blue Devils 41–7. Drive: 10 plays, 83 yards, TOP 03:43

Statistics

Statistics	DUKE	CONN
First downs	20	14
Total yards	322	203
Rushing yards	74	89
Passing yards	248	114
Turnovers	0	2
Time of possession	29:50	30:10

Team	Category	Player	Statistics
Duke	Passing	Riley Leonard	23/34, 248 yds, 1 TD
Duke	Rushing	Riley Leonard	4 att, 30 yds, 1 TD
Duke	Receiving	Jordan Moore	8 rec, 86 yds, 1 TD
Duke	Defense	Nick Morris Jr.	8 tackles, 1 FR
UConn	Passing	Ta'Quan Roberson	13/28, 114 yds
UConn	Rushing	Victor Rosa	14 att, 68 yds
UConn	Receiving	Brett Buckman	2 rec, 31 yds
UConn	Defense	Tui Faumuina-Brown	7 tackles

=== Utah State ===
Utah State Aggies at UConn Huskies – Game summary

Quarter	1	2	3	4	Total
Aggies	0	7	17	10	34
Huskies	7	10	0	16	33

at Pratt & Whitney Stadium at Rentschler Field, East Hartford, Connecticut

- Date: September 30
- Game time: 12:03 p.m. EDT
- Game weather: Cloudy, Wind N 8MPH, 60 °F (16 °C)
- Game attendance: 21,227
- Referee: Marcus Woods
- TV announcers (CBSSN): Chris Lewis (play-by-play), Ross Tucker (color analyst), Keiana Martin (sideline)
- Box Score

Game information
First quarter
- UCONN – Stafford, Jelani 1 yd run (McFadden, Joe kick), 1:14. Huskies 7–0. Drive: 12 plays, 80 yards, TOP 07:49

Second quarter

- UCONN – Harris, Nick 4 yd pass from Roberson, Ta'Quan (McFadden, Joe kick), 14:12. Huskies 14–0. Drive: 4 plays, 24 yards, TOP 01:38
- UCONN – McFadden, Joe 36 yd field goal, 0:37. Huskies 17–0. Drive: 13 plays, 48 yards, TOP 05:27
- USU – Bowman, Colby 63 yd pass from Hillstead, McCae (Nimrod, Elliott kick), 0:14. Huskies 17–7. Drive: 2 plays, 75 yards, TOP 00:23

Third quarter

- USU – Royals, Jalen 15 yd pass from Legas, Cooper (Nimrod, Elliott kick), 12:21. Huskies 17–14. Drive: 8 plays, 88 yards, TOP 02:39
- USU – Nimrod, Elliott 37 yd field goal, 6:56. Tied 17–17. Drive: 9 plays, 48 yards, TOP 03:47
- USU – Royals, Jalen 71 yd pass from Legas, Cooper (Nimrod, Elliott kick), 3:52. Aggies 24–17. Drive: 3 plays, 88 yards, TOP 00:56

Fourth quarter

- UCONN – Porter, Geordon 28 yd pass from Roberson, Ta'Quan (McFadden, Joe kick), 14:17. Tied 24–24. Drive: 8 plays, 88 yards, TOP 04:30
- USU – Royals, Jalen 52 yd pass from Legas, Cooper (Nimrod, Elliott kick), 12:36. Aggies 31–24. Drive: 5 plays, 75 yards, TOP 01:41
- UCONN - McFadden, Joe 38 yd field goal, 10:29. Aggies 31–27. Drive: 6 plays, 55 yards, TOP 02:07
- USU – Nimrod, Elliott 24 yd field goal, 5:20. Aggies 34–27. Drive: 12 plays, 69 yards, TOP 05:04
- UCONN – Stafford, Jelani 1 yd run (kick blocked), 0:40. Aggies 34–33. Drive: 9 plays, 85 yards, TOP 02:01

Statistics

Statistics	USU	CONN
First downs	21	26
Total yards	416	473
Rushing yards	101	218
Passing yards	315	255
Turnovers	2	1
Time of possession	21:31	38:29

Team	Category	Player	Statistics
Utah State	Passing	Cooper Legas	11/13, 204 yds, 3 TDs
Utah State	Rushing	Cooper Legas	6 att, 26 yds
Utah State	Receiving	Jalen Royals	7 rec, 185 yds, 3 TDs
Utah State	Defense	MJ Tafisi	13 tackles
UConn	Passing	Ta'Quan Roberson	23/32, 255 yds, 2 TDs
UConn	Rushing	Victor Rosa	15 att, 92 yds
UConn	Receiving	Cameron Ross	7 rec, 70 yds
UConn	Defense	Jackson Mitchell	15 tackles, 1 int

=== At Rice ===
UConn Huskies at Rice Owls – Game summary

Quarter	1	2	3	4	Total
Huskies	0	20	8	10	38
Owls	14	0	7	10	31

at Rice Stadium, Houston, Texas

- Date: October 7
- Game time: 5:02 p.m. est
- Game weather: Sunny, Wind NW 17 MPH, 75 °F (24 °C)
- Game attendance: 21,207
- Referee: Kevin Randall
- TV announcers (ESPN+): Shawn Kenney (play-by-play), LaDarrin McLane (color analyst), Smacker Miles (sideline)
- Box Score

Game information
First quarter
- RICE – Otoviano, Juma 24 yd run (Horn, Tim kick), 6:53. Owls 7–0. Drive: 6 plays, 75 yards, TOP 03:21
- RICE – Otoviano, Juma 7 yd run (Horn, Tim kick), 0:33. Owls 14–0. Drive: 8 plays, 78 yards, TOP 04:36

Second quarter

- UCONN – Stafford, Jelani 1 yd run (kick blocked), 10:49. Owls 14–6. Drive: 2 plays, 2 yards, TOP 00:44
- UCONN – Mitchell, Jackson 50 yd fumble recovery (McFadden, Joe kick), 9:54. Owls 14–13.
- UCONN – Ross, Cameron 41 yd pass from Roberson, Ta'Quan (McFadden, Joe kick), 3:48. Huskies 20–14. Drive: 7 plays, 67 yards, TOP 04:23

Third quarter

- UCONN – Stafford, Jelani 1 yd run (Joly, Justin pass), 9:52. Huskies 28–14. Drive: 7 plays, 41 yards, TOP 03:34
- RICE – McCaffrey, Luke 4 yd pass from Daniels, JT (Horn, Tim kick), 2:00. Huskies 28–21. Drive: 14 plays, 80 yards, TOP 07:45

Fourth quarter

- UCONN – McFadden, Joe 47 yd field goal, 14:02. Huskies 31–21. Drive: 7 plays, 46 yards, TOP 02:58
- RICE – McCaffrey, Luke 30 yd pass from Daniels, JT (Horn, Tim kick), 6:56. Huskies 31–28. Drive: 5 plays, 80 yards, TOP 02:22
- UCONN – Joly, Justin 59 yd pass from Roberson, Ta'Quan (McFadden, Joe kick), 5:06. Huskies 38–28. Drive: 3 plays, 76 yards, TOP 01:43
- RICE – Horn, Tim 23 yd field goal, 0:40. Huskies 38–31. Drive: 8 plays, 60 yards, TOP 01:30

Statistics

Statistics	CONN	RICE
First downs	12	26
Total yards	319	474
Rushing yards	104	112
Passing yards	215	362
Turnovers	0	4
Time of possession	29:03	30:57

Team	Category	Player	Statistics
UConn	Passing	Ta'Quan Roberson	15/19, 215 yds, 2 TDs
UConn	Rushing	Victor Rosa	18 att, 89 yds
UConn	Receiving	Justin Joly	7 rec, 96 yds, 1 TD
UConn	Defense	Jackson Mitchell	8 tackles, 1 FR
Rice	Passing	JT Daniels	33/49, 362 yds, 2 TDs
Rice	Rushing	Juma Otoviano	6 att, 51 yds, 2 TDs
Rice	Receiving	Luke McCaffrey	7 rec, 100 yds, 2 TDs
Rice	Defense	Plae Wyatt	10 tackles

=== South Florida ===
South Florida Bulls at UConn Huskies – Game summary

Quarter	1	2	3	4	Total
Bulls	7	3	0	14	24
Huskies	0	14	0	7	21

at Pratt & Whitney Stadium at Rentschler Field, East Hartford, Connecticut

- Date: October 21
- Game time: 3:32 p.m. EDT
- Game weather: Rain, Wind N 12 MPH, 56 °F (13 °C)
- Game attendance: 21,704
- Referee: Jeff Magallanes
- TV announcers (CBSSN): Chris Lewis (play-by-play), Robert Turbin (color analyst), Keiana Martin (sideline)
- Box Score

Game information
First quarter
- USF – Wright, Nay'Quan 1 yd run (Cannon, John kick), 10:21. Bulls 7–0. Drive: 2 plays, 10 yards, TOP 00:30

Second quarter

- UCONN – Roberson, Ta'Quan 24 yd run (McFadden, Joe kick), 14:04. Tied 7–7. Drive: 8 plays, 84 yards, TOP 03:44
- USF – Cannon, John 45 yd field goal, 6:48. Bulls 10–7. Drive: 8 plays, 44 yards, TOP 02:37
- UCONN – Edwards, Cam 6 yd pass from Roberson, Ta'Quan (McFadden, Joe kick), 3:40. Huskies: 14–10. Drive: 7 plays, 75 yards, TOP 03:08

Third quarter

- No Scoring Plays

Fourth quarter

- UCONN – Edwards, Cam 33 yd run (McFadden, Joe kick), 12:48. Huskies 21–10. Drive: 7 plays, 71 yards, TOP 03:46
- USF – Brown, Byrum 6 yd run (Cannon, John kick), 9:51. Huskies 21–7. Drive: 9 plays, 75 yards, TOP 02:54
- USF – Wright, Nay'Quan 4 yd run (Cannon, John kick), 4:02. Bulls 24–21. Drive: 9 plays, 90 yards, TOP 02:56

Statistics

Statistics	USF	CONN
First downs	24	20
Total yards	463	368
Rushing yards	260	193
Passing yards	203	175
Turnovers	1	4
Time of possession	30:10	29:50

Team	Category	Player	Statistics
South Florida	Passing	Byrum Brown	27/39, 203 yds
South Florida	Rushing	Nay'Quan Wright	26 att, 186 yds, 2 TDs
South Florida	Receiving	Michael Brown-Stephens	9 rec, 92 yds
South Florida	Defense	Jhalyn Shuler	8 tackles
UConn	Passing	Ta'Quan Roberson	19/34, 175 yds, 1 TD
UConn	Rushing	Cam Edwards	22 att, 149 yds, 1 TD
UConn	Receiving	Cameron Ross	5 rec, 87 yds
UConn	Defense	Jackson Mitchell	15 tackles

=== At Boston College ===
UConn Huskies at Boston College Eagles – Game summary

Quarter	1	2	3	4	Total
Huskies	7	0	0	7	14
Eagles	7	7	7	0	21

at Alumni Stadium, Chestnut Hill, Massachusetts

- Date: October 28
- Game time: 12:03 p.m. EDT
- Game weather: Sunny, Wind E 6 MPH, 76 °F (24 °C)
- Game attendance: 36,902
- Referee: Jeff Flanagan
- TV announcers (ACCN): Chris Cotter (play-by-play), Mark Herzlich (color analyst), Sherree Burruss (sideline)
- Box Score

Game information
First quarter
- UCONN – Stafford, Jelani 1 yd run (Ruelas, Noe kick), 4:26. Huskies 7–0. Drive: 9 plays, 51 yards, TOP 05:09
- BC – Robichaux, Kye 5 yd run (Connor, Liam kick), 0:09. Tied 7–7. Drive: 10 plays, 75 yards, TOP 04:17

Second quarter

- BC – Broome, Alex 6 yd pass from Castellanos, Thomas (Connor, Liam kick), 6:26. Eagles 14–7. Drive: 12 plays, 66 yards, TOP 06:02

Third quarter

- BC – Robichaux, Kye 13 yd run (Connor, Liam kick), 0:40. Eagles 21–7. Drive: 8 plays, 70 yards, TOP 04:44

Fourth quarter

- UCONN – Edwards, Cam 30 yd run (Ruelas, Noe kick), 13:51. Eagles 21–14. Drive: 7 plays, 78 yards, TOP 01:49

Statistics

Statistics	CONN	BC
First downs	10	30
Total yards	222	433
Rushing yards	92	246
Passing yards	130	187
Turnovers	0	2
Time of possession	19:16	40:44

Team	Category	Player	Statistics
UConn	Passing	Ta'Quan Roberson	11/24, 130 yds
UConn	Rushing	Cam Edwards	16 att, 89 yds, 1 TD
UConn	Receiving	Geordon Porter	3 rec, 47 yds
UConn	Defense	Tui Faumuina-Brown	12 tackles
Boston College	Passing	Thomas Castellanos	16/24, 151 yds, 1 TD
Boston College	Rushing	Kye Robichaux	23 att, 112 yds, 2 TDs
Boston College	Receiving	Jaedn Skeete	4 rec, 61 yds
Boston College	Defense	Vinny DePalma	5 tackles

=== at Tennessee ===
Game Nine – UConn Huskies (1–7) at No. 17 Tennessee Volunteers (6–2) – Game summary

Quarter	1	2	3	4	Total
UConn	3	0	0	0	3
No. 17 Tennessee	14	21	21	3	59

at Neyland Stadium • Knoxville, Tennessee

- Date: November 4, 2023
- Game time: 12:00 p.m. EST
- Game weather: Sunny, Wind 0 MPH, 54 °F (12 °C)
- Game attendance: 101,915
- Referee: Kyle Olson
- TV announcers (SECN): Dave Neal (play-by-play), Derek Mason (color analyst), Alex Chappell (sideline)

Game information

First quarter

- TEN – Jaylen Wright 82-yard run (Charles Campbell kick), 14:27. Volunteers 7–0. Drive: 2 plays, 85 yards, TOP 00:28
- CONN – Noe Ruelas 22-yard field goal, 2:47. Volunteers 7–3. Drive: 10 plays, 79 yards, TOP 06:49
- TEN – Ramel Keyton 60-yard pass from Joe Milton III (Charles Campbell kick), 1:38. Volunteers 14–3. Drive: 4 plays, 77 yards, TOP 01:01

Second quarter

- TEN – Joe Milton III 6-yard run (Charles Campbell kick), 7:25. Volunteers 21–3. Drive: 8 plays, 62 yards, TOP 02:47
- TEN – Squirrel White 83-yard pass from Joe Milton III (Charles Campbell kick), 4:34. Volunteers 28–3. Drive: 3 plays, 95 yards, TOP 00:47
- TEN – Tyler Baron 24-yard fumble recovery (Charles Campbell kick), 3:30. Volunteers 35–3.

Third quarter

- TEN – Jaylen McCollough 30-yard interception return (Charles Campbell kick), 14:52. Volunteers 42–3.
- TEN – Aaron Beasley 39-yard interception return (Charles Campbell kick), 11:51. Volunteers 49–3.
- TEN – McCallan Castles 19-yard pass from Nico Iamaleava (Josh Turbyville kick), 7:30. Volunteers 56–3. Drive: 8 plays, 78 yards, TOP 02:21

Fourth quarter

- TEN – Josh Turbyville 33-yard field goal, 8:02. Volunteers 59–3. Drive: 8 plays, 45 yards, TOP 02:13

Statistics	CONN	TENN
First downs	17	26
Total yards	256	650
Rushing yards	35	275
Passing yards	221	375
Turnovers	3	0
Time of possession	38:24	21:36

Team	Category	Player	Statistics
UConn	Passing	Ta'Quan Roberson	24/40, 218 yds
UConn	Rushing	Jalen Mitchell	8 carries, 28 yards
UConn	Receiving	Justin Joly	8 receptions, 89 yards
UConn	Defense	Jackson Mitchell	8 tackles
Tennessee	Passing	Joe Milton III	11/14, 254 yds, 2 TDs
Tennessee	Rushing	Jaylen Wright	8 carries, 113 yards, TD
Tennessee	Receiving	Squirrel White	2 receptions, 94 yards, TD
Tennessee	Defense	Elijah Herring	7 tackles

=== At James Madison ===
UConn Huskies at James Madison Dukes – Game summary

Quarter	1	2	3	4	Total
Huskies	0	3	3	0	6
Dukes	3	10	17	14	44

at Bridgeforth Stadium, Harrisonburg, Virginia

- Date: November 11
- Game time: 2:02 p.m.
- Game weather: Sunny, 55 °F (13 °C)
- Game attendance: 25,240
- Referee: Marshall Lewis
- TV announcers (ESPN+): Curt Dudley, Vad Lee, Corey Spector
- Box Score

Game information
First quarter
- JMU – Wise, Camden 34 yd field goal, 0:10. Dukes 3–0. Drive: 12 plays, 78 yards, TOP 06:51

Second quarter

- JMU – Wise, Camden 29 yd field goal, 9:25. Dukes 6–0. Drive: 8 plays, 33 yards, TOP 04:00
- JMU – Brown, Reggie 80 yd pass from McCloud, Jordan (Wise, Camden kick), 7:40. Dukes 13–0. Drive: 1 plays, 80 yards, TOP 00:11
- CONN – Ruelas, Noe 41 yd field goal, 3:26. Dukes 13–3. Drive: 10 plays, 52 yards, TOP 04:14

Third quarter

- JMU – Wise, Camden 28 yd field goal, 12:09. Dukes 16–3. Drive: 6 plays, 29 yards, TOP 02:26
- CONN – Ruelas, Noe 31 yd field goal, 7:42. Dukes 16–6. Drive: 10 plays, 63 yards, TOP 04:21
- JMU – Horton, Zach 21 yd pass from McCloud, Jordan (Wise, Camden kick), 5:54. Dukes 23–6. Drive: 4 plays, 75 yards, TOP 01:48
- JMU – Brown, Reggie 55 yd pass from McCloud, Jordan (Wise, Camden kick), 2:06. Dukes 30–6. Drive: 5 plays, 80 yards, TOP 01:53

Fourth quarter

- JMU – Sproles, Phoenix 5 yd pass from McCloud, Jordan (Wise, Camden kick), 6:43. Dukes 37–6. Drive: 10 plays, 90 yards, TOP 05:04
- JMU – Austin, Brent 81 yd interception (Wise, Camden kick), 3:43. Dukes 44–6.

Statistics

Statistics	CONN	JMU
First downs	15	23
Total yards	319	503
Rushing yards	79	46
Passing yards	240	457
Turnovers	2	0
Time of possession	29:08	30:52

Team	Category	Player	Statistics
UConn	Passing	Ta'Quan Roberson	20/36, 207 yds
UConn	Rushing	Cam Edwards	12 att, 43 yds
UConn	Receiving	Cameron Ross	4 rec, 91 yds
UConn	Defense	Malik Dixon-Williams	8 tackles, 1 FF
James Madison	Passing	Jordan McCloud	33/37, 457 yds, 4 TDs
James Madison	Rushing	Kaelon Black	4 att, 38 yds
James Madison	Receiving	Reggie Brown	9 rec, 202 yds, 2 TDs
James Madison	Defense	Aiden Fisher	9 tackles

=== Sacred Heart ===
Sacred Heart Pioneers at UConn Huskies – Game summary

Quarter	1	2	3	4	Total
Pioneers	0	3	0	0	3
Huskies	17	7	0	7	31

at Pratt & Whitney Stadium at Rentschler Field, East Hartford, Connecticut

- Date: November 18
- Game time: 12:03 p.m. EST
- Game weather: Cloudy, Wind NW 12 MPH, 52 °F (11 °C)
- Game attendance: 19,053
- Referee: Mike Roche
- TV announcers (WFSB): Randy Brochu & Marc Robbins
- Box Score

Game information
First quarter
- UCONN – McFadden, Joe 50 yd field goal, 8:50. Huskies 3–0. Drive: 8 plays, 30 yards, TOP 04:25
- UCONN – Ross, Cameron 46 yd pass from Roberson, Ta'Quan (McFadden, Joe kick), 5:45. Huskies 10–0. Drive: 4 plays, 68 yards, TOP 02:10
- UCONN – Joly, Justin 12 yd pass from Roberson, Ta'Quan (McFadden, Joe kick), 0:38. Huskies 17–0. Drive: 6 plays, 35 yards, TOP 03:39

Second quarter

- SHU – Renzi, Sam 24 yd field goal, 2:02. Huskies 17–3. Drive: 12 plays, 68 yards, TOP 05:16
- UCONN – Hicks, Kylish 14 yd pass from Roberson, Ta'Quan (McFadden, Joe kick), 0:17. Huskies 24–3. Drive: 13 plays, 74 yards, TOP 01:38

Fourth quarter

- UCONN – Buckman, Brett 11 yd pass from Roberson, Ta'Quan (McFadden, Joe kick), 5:37. Huskies 31–3. Drive: 10 plays, 67 yards, TOP 04:50

Statistics

Statistics	SHU	CONN
First downs	13	24
Total yards	224	407
Rushing yards	78	206
Passing yards	146	201
Turnovers	0	0
Time of possession	26:58	32:24

Team	Category	Player	Statistics
Sacred Heart	Passing	Rob McCoy	17/26, 146 yds
Sacred Heart	Rushing	Rob McCoy	9 att, 31 yds
Sacred Heart	Receiving	Aboraa Kwarteng	5 rec, 45 yds
Sacred Heart	Defense	Marques Mason	12 tackles
UConn	Passing	Ta'Quan Roberson	22/35, 201 yds, 4 TDs
UConn	Rushing	Cam Edwards	12 att, 90 yds
UConn	Receiving	Justin Joly	9 rec, 73 yds, 1 TD
UConn	Defense	Jackson Mitchell	11 tackles

=== At UMass ===
UConn Huskies at UMass Minutemen – Game summary

Quarter	1	2	3	4	Total
Huskies	6	13	6	6	31
Minutemen	0	0	6	12	18

at Warren McGuirk Alumni Stadium, Hadley, Massachusetts

- Date: November 25
- Game time: 12:06 p.m. EST
- Game weather: Sunny, Wind SW 2 MPH, 36 °F (2 °C)
- Game attendance: 12,291
- Referee: Jerry Magallanes
- TV announcers (ESPN+): Jay Burnham, Andy Gresh & Matt Goldstein
- Box Score

Game information
First quarter
- CONN – Bin-Wahad, Mumu 45 yd interception (Kick no good), 10:04. Huskies 6–0

Second quarter

- CONN – McFadden, Joe 31 yd field goal, 13:42. Huskies 9–0. Drive: 6 plays, 15 yards, TOP 01:27
- CONN – McFadden, Joe 30 yd field goal, 8:46. Huskies 12–0. Drive: 7 plays, 33 yards, TOP 02:29
- CONN – Rosa, Victor 17 yd run (McFadden, Joe kick), 6:02. Huskies 19–0. Drive: 3 plays, 27 yards, TOP 01:14

Third quarter

- MASS – Campiotti, Gino 10 yd pass from Phommachanh, Taisun (Phommachanh, Taisun pass attempt no good), 11:58. Huskies 19–6. Drive: 6 plays, 37 yards, TOP 02:50
- CONN – Edwards, Cam 4 yd run (Roberson, Ta'Quan pass attempt no good), 1:08. Huskies 25–6. Drive: 9 plays, 70 yards, TOP 05:45

Fourth quarter

- MASS – Adams, Kay'Ron 1 yd run (Phommachanh, Taisun pass attempt no good), 11:52. Huskies 25–12. Drive: 6 plays, 73 yards, TOP 01:33
- CONN – Edwards, Cam 8 yd run (Roberson, Ta'Quan pass attempt no good), 3:34. Huskies 31–12. Drive: 12 plays, 77 yards, TOP 08:12
- MASS – Adams, Kay'Ron 1 yd run (Phommachanh, Taisun pass attempt no good), 2:03. Huskies 31–18. Drive: 4 plays, 78 yards, TOP 01:25

Statistics

Statistics	CONN	MASS
First downs	24	18
Total yards	414	289
Rushing yards	240	59
Passing yards	174	230
Turnovers	1	3
Time of possession	37:36	22:24

Team	Category	Player	Statistics
UConn	Passing	Ta'Quan Roberson	16/28, 174 yds
UConn	Rushing	Cam Edwards	19 att, 102 yds, 2 TDs
UConn	Receiving	Cameron Ross	3 rec, 52 yds
UConn	Defense	Jackson Mitchell	7 tackles, 1 FF
UMass	Passing	Taisun Phommachanh	18/30, 230 yds, 1 TD
UMass	Rushing	Kay'Ron Adams	18 att, 51 yds, 2 TDs
UMass	Receiving	Anthony Simpson	6 rec, 107 yds
UMass	Defense	Nahji Logan	9 tackles

== Roster ==
2023 UConn Huskies football team roster
Players
Coaches
Offense

Pos.	#	Name	Class
RB	0	Cam Edwards	So
RB	1	Devontae Houston	Jr
QB	2	Joseph Fagnano (injured)	Sr
WR	3	Geordon Porter	GS
RB	4	Brian Brewton	Jr
RB	5	Jalen Mitchell	GS
QB	6	Ta'Quan Roberson	Jr
WR	7	Cameron Ross	Jr
WR	8	Dajon Harrison	So
WR	9	Zackary Drawdy	Fr
WR	10	Brett Buckman	GS
QB	10	Cale Millen	Jr
QB	11	Zion Turner	So
QB	12	Tucker McDonald	Fr
WR	13	James Burns	GS
TE	14	Nick Harris	Jr
WR	16	Kevens Clercius	Jr
TE	17	Justin Joly	So
WR	18	Kylish Hicks	Fr
WR	19	Jackson Harper	Fr
RB	22	Victor Rosa	So
WR	23	Bryan Domino	Fr
RB	30	Hunter Clark	So
RB	35	Frank Daniley	Fr
RB	36	Daniel Shaban	Fr
WR	37	Zach Madison	Fr
WR	38	John Neider	Fr
TE	39	Cody Smith	Fr
OL	51	Yakiri Walker	So
OL	54	Jake Kiernan	Fr
OL	55	Toluwanimi Tunde	Fr
OL	58	Kyle Juergans	So
OL	60	Mason Raymer	Jr
OL	62	Noel Ofori-Nyadu	Sr
OL	64	Christian Haynes	Sr
OL	66	Brady Wayburn	Fr
OL	67	Christopher Fortin	Jr
OL	69	Will Meyer	Jr
OL	70	Jack Stewart	Jr
OL	71	Valentin Senn	Jr
OL	73	Dayne Shor	So
OL	75	Chase Lundt	Jr
OL	76	Toriyan Johnson	Fr
OL	77	Ben Murawski	Fr
OT	78	Carsten Casady	Fr
OL	79	Danny Antolovich	So
TE	80	Rayonte Brown	Jr
TE	81	Louis Hansen	So
WR	82	Jarvis Jones	Fr
TE	83	Brandon Niemenski	Jr
WR	84	Jacob Flynn	Jr
WR	85	Teddy Williams	Fr
TE	86	Alexander Honig	So
TE	87	Bo Estes	Jr
TE	88	Nader Chirchi	Fr
WR	89	Larue Graham	Sr

Defense

Pos.	#	Name	Class
LB	0	Eriq Gilyard	GS
DB	1	Malik Dixon-Williams	Jr
DB	2	Durante Jones	Jr
DB	3	D'Mon Brinson	So
DB	4	Stan Cross	Sr
DB	5	Kaleb Anthony	Jr
DB	5	Armauni Archie	GS
CB	6	Mamu Bin-Wahad	So
DB	7	Chris Shearin	Jr
LB	8	Jackson Mitchell	Sr
S	9	Zakhari Spears	So
DB	11	Isiah Davis	Fr
LB	12	Amir Renwick	Jr
LB	13	Nathan Voorhis	So
DB	14	Malcolm Bell	So
LB	15	Tui Faumuina-Brown	Jr
LB	16	Maurice Wilmer	Jr
LB	17	Kevon Glenn	Jr
LB	18	Jaylen Jones	Jr
LB	19	Langston Hardy	Fr
DB	20	Torion White	So
DB	21	Lee Molette III	So
LB	22	Noah Plack	GS
LB	23	Alfred Chea	Jr
LB	24	Desmond Fogle	Jr
DB	25	Cam Chadwick	Fr
DB	26	Chris Hudson	Fr
LB	27	Ian Graham	Fr
LB	31	Kalen Villanueva	So
LB	32	Oumar Diomande	Fr
DB	34	Carter Boskovich	Fr
DB	36	Chase Fountain	Fr
LB	37	Hayden Pegg	Fr
LB	38	Mark Sokk	Fr
LB	46	John Bechtle	Jr
DL	50	Brandon Kelly	Fr
DL	55	Cleto Chol	Fr
DL	56	Carter Hooper	So
LB	58	Donovan Branch	So
DL	61	Jesse Polansky	So
DL	73	Brady Fodor	Fr
DL	90	Pryce Yates	So
DL	91	Collin McCarthy	Jr
DL	92	Timothy Passmore Jr.	Fr
DL	93	Raashaan Wilkins Jr.	Sr
DL	94	Matt Hoffman	Fr
DL	95	Eric Watts	Sr
DL	96	Dal'mont Gourdine	Jr
DL	97	Jelani Stafford	Jr
DT	98	Jaavon Brown	Jr
DL	99	Sokoya McDuffie	Sr

Special teams

Pos.	#	Name	Class
K	17	Noe Ruelas	Jr
P	40	Bruno Perlicki	Fr
P	42	George Caratan	Jr
LS	44	Nilay Upadhyayula	So
P	45	Seth Turner	Fr
LS	46	Zach Christinat	Fr
K	84	Joe McFadden	So

Head coach

- Jim L. Mora

Coordinators/assistant coaches

- Nick Charlton
  Assistant Head Coach/Offensive Coordinator/Quarterbacks
- Doug Shearer
  Special teams coordinator
- John Marinelli
  Pass Game Coordinator
- Gordan Sammis
  Run Game Coordinator/Offensive Line
- Antonio Wilcox
  Running Backs
- Siriki Diabate
  Linebackers
- Dalton Hilliard
  Defensive backs
- Kenny McClendon
  Defensive line
- Kashif Moore
  Wide Receivers
- Christian Pace
  Tight Ends

Legend

- (C) Team captain
- (S) Suspended
- (I) Ineligible
- Injured
- Redshirt

Roster
Last update: August 26, 2023

== NFL draft ==
One Husky was selected in the 2024 NFL draft following the season.

Round	Pick	Player	Position	NFL team
3	81	Christian Haynes	Guard	Seattle Seahawks
