= 2023 Famous Idaho Potato Bowl =

Postseason college football bowl game

- 27th Famous Idaho Potato Bowl
Georgia State Panthers	Utah State Aggies
(6–6)	(6–6)
Sun Belt	MW
45	22
Head coach: Shawn Elliott	Head coach: Blake Anderson
	1	2	3	4	Total
Georgia State	21	10	7	7	45
Utah State	14	0	0	8	22
- Date: December 23, 2023
- Season: 2023
- Stadium: Albertsons Stadium
- Location: Boise, Idaho
- MVP: Darren Grainger (QB, Georgia State)
- Favorite: Utah State by 1.5
- Referee: Jeremy Valentine (MAC)
- Attendance: 12,168

United States TV coverage
- Network: ESPN; ESPN Radio
- Announcers: Chris Cotter (play-by-play), Mark Herzlich (analyst), and Morgan Uber (sideline) (ESPN); Clay Matvick (play-by-play) and Dave Steckel (analyst) (ESPN Radio)

International TV coverage
- Network: ESPN Deportes

The 2023 Famous Idaho Potato Bowl was a college football bowl game played on December 23, 2023, at Albertsons Stadium in Boise, Idaho. The 27th annual Famous Idaho Potato Bowl featured the Utah State Aggies of the Mountain West Conference and the Georgia State Panthers from the Sun Belt Conference. The game began at approximately 1:30 p.m. MST and was aired on ESPN. The Famous Idaho Potato Bowl was one of the 2023–24 bowl games concluding the 2023 FBS football season. The game was sponsored by the Idaho Potato Commission marketing board.

== Teams ==
The game features the Utah State Aggies from the Mountain West Conference against the Georgia State Panthers from the Sun Belt Conference.

This is the first time that Utah State and Georgia State have ever played each other.

=== Utah State Aggies ===
The Aggies entered the game with a 6–6 record (4–4 in Mountain West play), tied for sixth place in their conference.

This is Utah State's fifth Famous Idaho Potato Bowl, the most appearances in the game. The Aggies' have a 1–3 record in prior Famous Idaho Potato Bowls, their lone win coming in the 2012 edition.

=== Georgia State Panthers ===
The Panthers entered the game with a 6–6 record (3–5 in Sun Belt play), tied for fifth place in their conference's East Division.

This is Georgia State's first Famous Idaho Potato Bowl.

== Game summary ==
2023 Famous Idaho Potato Bowl

Quarter	1	2	3	4	Total
Georgia State	21	10	7	7	45
Utah State	14	0	0	8	22

at Albertsons Stadium • Boise, Idaho

- Date: Tuesday, December 23, 2023
- Game time: 1:30 p.m. MST
- Game weather: Sunny • Temperature: 39 °F (4 °C) • Wind: 15 mph (24 km/h) NW
- Game attendance: 12,168
- Referee: Jeremy Valentine
- TV announcers (ESPN): Chris Cotter (play-by-play), Mark Herzlich (analyst), and Morgan Uber (sideline)
- Box score

Game information

First Quarter

- (7:36) GSU – Darren Grainger 1 yard run, Liam Rickman kick (Drive: 10 plays, 68 yards, 4:34; Georgia State 7–0)
- (6:15) USU – Jalen Royals 35 yard pass from Levi Williams, Elliott Nimrod kick (Drive: 4 plays, 50 yards, 1:21; Tied 7–7)
- (3:57) GSU – Darren Grainger 1 yard run, Liam Rickman kick (Drive: 5 plays, 75 yards, 2:18; Georgia State 14–7)
- (3:41) USU – Davon Booth 65 yard run, Elliott Nimrod kick (Drive: 2 plays, 65 yards, 0:16; Tied 14–14)
- (0:15) GSU – Tailique Williams 27 yard pass from Darren Grainger, Liam Rickman kick (Drive: 7 plays, 75 yards, 3:26; Georgia State 21–14)

Second Quarter

- (7:30) GSU – Liam Rickman 31 yard field goal (Drive: 4 plays, -3 yards, 1:32; Georgia State 24–14)
- (1:17) GSU – Cadarrius Thompson 23 yard pass from Darren Grainger, Liam Rickman kick (Drive: 9 plays, 80 yards, 3:20; Georgia State 31–14)

Third Quarter

- (6:02) GSU – Cadarrius Thompson 37 yard pass from Darren Grainger, Liam Rickman kick (Drive: 9 plays, 80 yards, 4:26; Georgia State 38–14)

Fourth Quarter

- (9:18) GSU – Freddie Brock 5 yard run, Liam Rickman kick (Drive: 5 plays, 71 yards, 2:54; Georgia State 45–14)
- (4:48) USU – Terrell Vaughn 2 yard pass from McCae Hillstead, Jalen Royals two-point pass conversion from McCae Hillstead (Drive: 11 plays, 75 yards, 4:30; Georgia State 45–22)

=== Statistics ===
Statistics	GSU	USU
First downs	24	18
Plays–yards	71–643	64–347
Rushes–yards	49–386	32–159
Passing yards	257	188
Passing: comp–att–int	19–22–0	19–32–1
Time of possession	36:12	23:48

Team	Category	Player	Statistics
Georgia State	Passing	Darren Grainger	19/22, 257 yards, 3 TD
Georgia State	Rushing	Freddie Brock	24 carries, 276 yards, TD
Georgia State	Receiving	Cadarrius Thompson	5 receptions, 117 yards, 2 TD
Utah State	Passing	Levi Williams	12/21, 131 yards, TD, INT
Utah State	Rushing	Davon Booth	4 carries, 71 yards, TD
Utah State	Receiving	Terrell Vaughn	8 receptions, 86 yards, TD
