= 2023 UMass Minutemen football team =

American college football season

2023 UMass Minutemen football
- Conference: Independent
- Record: 3–9
- Head coach: Don Brown (7th season)
- Offensive coordinator: Steve Casula (2nd season)
- Offensive scheme: Multiple pro
- Defensive coordinator: Keith Dudzinski (9th season)
- Base defense: 4–3 or 4–2–5
- Home stadium: Warren McGuirk Alumni Stadium

2023 NCAA Division I FBS independents football records
| | Conf. | | | Overall |
| Team | W | | L | W | | L |
|---|---|---|---|---|---|---|
| No. 14 Notre Dame | | – | | 10 | – | 3 |
| Army | | – | | 6 | – | 6 |
| UConn | | – | | 3 | – | 9 |
| UMass | | – | | 3 | – | 9 |
Rankings from AP Poll

The 2023 UMass Minutemen football team represented the University of Massachusetts Amherst in the 2023 NCAA Division I FBS football season. They played their home games at Warren McGuirk Alumni Stadium in Hadley, Massachusetts and compete as an FBS independent. They were led by head coach Don Brown in his second season since he was rehired, his seventh overall as head coach.

== Schedule ==
UMass announced their 2023 football schedule on February 2, 2023.

| Date | Time | Opponent | Site | TV | Result | Attendance |
|---|---|---|---|---|---|---|
| August 26 | 7:00 p.m. | at New Mexico State | Aggie Memorial Stadium; Las Cruces, NM | ESPN | W 41–30 | 15,356 |
| September 2 | 3:30 p.m. | at Auburn | Jordan–Hare Stadium; Auburn, AL | ESPN | L 14–59 | 88,043 |
| September 9 | 3:30 p.m. | Miami (OH) | Warren McGuirk Alumni Stadium; Hadley, MA | ESPN+ | L 28–41 | 9,207 |
| September 16 | 2:00 p.m. | at Eastern Michigan | Rynearson Stadium; Ypsilanti, MI | ESPN+ | L 17–19 | 16,138 |
| September 23 | 3:30 p.m. | New Mexico | Warren McGuirk Alumni Stadium; Hadley, MA | ESPN+ | L 31–34 | 8,298 |
| September 30 | 3:30 p.m. | Arkansas State | Warren McGuirk Alumni Stadium; Hadley, MA | ESPN+ | L 28–52 | 9,494 |
| October 7 | 12:00 p.m. | Toledo | Warren McGuirk Alumni Stadium; Hadley, MA | ESPNU | L 24–41 | 9,623 |
| October 14 | 3:30 p.m. | at No. 6 Penn State | Beaver Stadium; University Park, PA | BTN | L 0–63 | 105,533 |
| October 28 | 12:00 p.m. | at Army | Michie Stadium; West Point, NY | CBSSN | W 21–14 | 29,625 |
| November 4 | 3:30 p.m. | Merrimack^{†} | Warren McGuirk Alumni Stadium; Hadley, MA | ESPN+ | W 31–21 | 14,672 |
| November 18 | 1:00 p.m. | at Liberty | Williams Stadium; Lynchburg, VA | ESPN+ | L 25–49 | 16,860 |
| November 25 | 12:00 p.m. | UConn | Warren McGuirk Alumni Stadium; Hadley, MA (rivalry) | ESPN+ | L 18–31 | 12,291 |
^{†}Homecoming; Rankings from AP Poll (and CFP Rankings, after November 1) - Released prior to game; All times are in Eastern time

== Game summaries ==
=== at New Mexico State ===
UMass Minutemen at New Mexico State Aggies – Game summary

| Quarter | 1 | 2 | 3 | 4 | Total |
|---|---|---|---|---|---|
| Minutemen | 7 | 3 | 3 | 28 | 41 |
| Aggies | 0 | 10 | 0 | 20 | 30 |

at Aggie Memorial Stadium • Las Cruces, New Mexico

- Date: August 26
- Game time: 7:00 p.m. EDT/5:00 p.m. MDT
- Game weather: Sunny • Temperature: 95 °F (35 °C) • Wind: NW 9 mph
- Game attendance: 15,536
- Referee: Rory Bernard
- TV announcers (ESPN): John Schriffen, Rocky Boiman, and Dawn Davenport
- Box score, Recap

Game information
First quarter
- MASS – Anthony Simpson 10-yard run (Cameron Carson kick), 10:20. Minutemen 7–0. Drive: 3 plays, 35 yards, 1:08.

Second quarter

- NMSU – Monte Watkins 80-yard run (Ethan Albertson kick), 8:34. Tied 7–7. Drive: 2 plays, 85 yards, 0:58.
- MASS – Cameron Carson 33-yard field goal, 3:55. Minutemen 10–7. Drive: 9 plays, 61 yards, 4:39.
- NMSU – Ethan Albertson 36-yard field goal, 0:03. Tied 10–10. Drive: 9 plays, 58 yards, 3:55.

Third quarter

- MASS – Cameron Carson 29-yard field goal, 6:27. Minutemen 13–10. Drive: 11 plays, 55 yards, 6:16.

Fourth quarter

- MASS – Taisun Phommachanh 11-yard run (Cameron Carson kick), 14:28. Minutemen 20–10. Drive: 3 plays, 80 yards, 0:47.
- NMSU – Trent Hudson 42-yard pass from Diego Pavia (Ethan Albertson kick), 13:27. Minutemen 20–17. Drive: 3 plays, 79 yards, 1:01.
- MASS – Kay'Ron Lynch-Adams 10-yard run (Cameron Carson kick), 7:47. Minutemen 27–17. Drive: 10 plays, 75 yards, 5:40.
- MASS – Isaiah Rutherford 57-yard interception return (Cameron Carson kick), 6:40. Minutemen 34–17.
- NMSU – Jordin Parker 40-yard pass from Diego Pavia (Ethan Albertson kick), 4:35. Minutemen 34–24. Drive: 8 plays, 75 yards, 2:05.
- MASS – Kay'Ron Lynch-Adams 21-yard run (Cameron Carson kick), 1:43. Minutemen 41–24. Drive: 2 plays, 24 yards, 0:53.
- NMSU – Trent Hudson 1-yard pass from Diego Pavia, 0:00. Minutemen 41–30. Drive: 9 plays, 75 yards, 1:43.

| Statistics | MASS | NMSU |
|---|---|---|
| First downs | 16 | 22 |
| Total yards | 389 | 468 |
| Rushing yards | 197 | 220 |
| Passing yards | 192 | 248 |
| Turnovers | 0 | 3 |
| Time of possession | 28:20 | 31:43 |

| Team | Category | Player | Statistics |
|---|---|---|---|
| UMass | Passing | Taisun Phommachanh | 10/17, 192 yards |
| UMass | Rushing | Taisun Phommachanh | 16 rushes, 92 yards, TD |
| UMass | Receiving | Christian Wells | 1 reception, 68 yards |
| New Mexico State | Passing | Diego Pavia | 16/27, 248 yards, 3 TD, 2 INT |
| New Mexico State | Rushing | Monte Watkins | 2 rushes, 95 yards, TD |
| New Mexico State | Receiving | Jonathan Brady | 2 receptions, 48 yards |

This was the Minutemen's first road win since week 9 of the 2018 season.

=== at Auburn ===
UMass Minutemen at Auburn Tigers – Game summary

| Quarter | 1 | 2 | 3 | 4 | Total |
|---|---|---|---|---|---|
| Minutemen | 7 | 0 | 0 | 7 | 14 |
| Tigers | 10 | 21 | 21 | 7 | 59 |

at Jordan–Hare Stadium • Auburn, Alabama

- Date: September 2
- Game time: 3:30 p.m. EDT/2:30 p.m. CDT
- Game weather: Sunny • Temperature: 83 °F (28 °C) • Wind: E 8 mph
- Game attendance: 88,043
- Referee: Lee Hedrick
- TV announcers (ESPN): Beth Mowins, Kirk Morrison, and Stormy Buonantony
- Box score, Recap

Game information
First quarter
- AUB – Damari Atson 2-yard run (Alex McPherson kick), 11:28. Tigers 7–0. Drive: 11 plays, 62 yards, 3:26.
- MASS – Taisun Phommachanh 1-yard run (Cameron Carson kick), 7:20. Tied 7–7. Drive: 8 plays, 89 yards, 4:02.
- AUB – Alex McPherson 37-yard field goal, 2:11. Tigers 10–7. Drive: 13 plays, 51 yards, 5:02.

Second quarter

- AUB – Robby Ashford 10-yard run (Alex McPherson kick), 14:55. Tigers 17–7. Drive: 2 plays, 16 yards, 0:33.
- AUB – Robby Ashford 1-yard run (Alex McPherson kick), 10:11. Tigers 24–7. Drive: 9 plays, 60 yards, 3:15.
- AUB – Robby Ashford 4-yard run (Alex McPherson kick), 4:42. Tigers 31–7. Drive: 5 plays, 35 yards, 2:32.

Third quarter

- AUB – Jaylin Simpson 50-yard interception return (Alex McPherson kick), 14:43. Tigers 38–7.
- AUB – Jay Fair 29-yard pass from Payton Thorne (Alex McPherson kick), 12:52. Tigers 45–7. Drive: 1 play, 29 yards, 0:10.
- AUB – Jeremiah Cobb 42-yard run (Alex McPherson kick), 5:25. Tigers 52–7. Drive: 1 play, 42 yards, 0:11.

Fourth quarter

- MASS – Anthony Simpson 58-yard pass from Carlos Davis (Cameron Carson kick), 8:50. Tigers 52–14. Drive: 1 play, 58 yards, 0:14.
- AUB – Sean Jackson 45-yard run (Alex McPherson kick), 7:02. Tigers 59–14. Drive: 3 plays, 78 yards, 1:48.

| Statistics | MASS | AUB |
|---|---|---|
| First downs | 11 | 27 |
| Total yards | 301 | 492 |
| Rushing yards | 140 | 289 |
| Passing yards | 161 | 203 |
| Turnovers | 2 | 0 |
| Time of possession | 29:25 | 30:35 |

| Team | Category | Player | Statistics |
|---|---|---|---|
| UMass | Passing | Carlos Davis | 6/8, 106 yards, TD |
| UMass | Rushing | Kay'Ron Lynch-Adams | 14 rushes, 101 yards |
| UMass | Receiving | Anthony Simpson | 4 receptions, 89 yards, TD |
| Auburn | Passing | Payton Thorne | 10/17, 141 yards, TD |
| Auburn | Rushing | Sean Jackson | 5 rushes, 64 yards, TD |
| Auburn | Receiving | Jay Fair | 5 receptions, 56 yards, TD |

=== Miami (OH) ===
Miami (OH) RedHawks at UMass Minutemen – Game summary

| Quarter | 1 | 2 | 3 | 4 | Total |
|---|---|---|---|---|---|
| RedHawks | 21 | 7 | 3 | 10 | 41 |
| Minutemen | 0 | 7 | 14 | 7 | 28 |

at Warren McGuirk Alumni Stadium • Hadley, Massachusetts

- Date: September 9
- Game time: 3:30 p.m. EDT
- Game weather: Cloudy • Temperature: 87 °F (31 °C) • Wind: S 7 MPH
- Game attendance: 9,207
- Referee: Charles Lamertina
- TV announcers (ESPN+): Jay Burnham, Andy Gresh, and Matt Goldstein
- Box score, Recap

Game information

First quarter

- M-OH – Gage Larvadain 26-yard pass from Brett Gabbert (Kellan McLaughlin kick), 13:14. RedHawks 7–0. Drive: 4 plays, 75 yards, 1:46.
- M-OH – Gage Larvadain 99-yard pass from Brett Gabbert (Graham Nicholson kick), 1:40. RedHawks 14–0. Drive: 2 plays, 99 yards, 1:02.
- M-OH – Kobe Hilton 0-yard fumble return (Graham Nicholson kick), 1:17. RedHawks 21–0.

Second quarter

- MASS – Dashaun Jerkins 53-yard interception return (Cameron Carson kick), 11:10. RedHawks 21–7.
- M-OH – Gage Larvadain 13-yard pass from Brett Gabbert (Graham Nicholson kick), 2:39. RedHawks 28–7. Drive: 6 plays, 52 yards, 2:51.

Third quarter

- MASS – Greg Desrosiers Jr. 32-yard pass from Carlos Davis (Cameron Carson kick), 10:20. RedHawks 28–14. Drive: 5 plays, 62 yards, 2:17.
- MASS – Mark Pope 50-yard pass from Carlos Davis (Cameron Carson kick), 2:51. RedHawks 28–21. Drive: 9 plays, 89 yards, 5:00.
- M-OH – Graham Nicholson 33-yard field goal, 0:12. RedHawks 31–21. Drive: 7 plays, 44 yards, 2:32.

Fourth quarter

- MASS – George Johnson III 5-yard pass from Carlos Davis (Cameron Carson kick), 11:16. RedHawks 31–28. Drive: 2 plays, 2 yards, 0:43.
- M-OH – Cade McDonald 1-yard pass from Brett Gabbert (Graham Nicholson kick), 10:57. RedHawks 38–28. Drive: 1 play, 70 yards, 0:11.
- M-OH – Graham Nicholson 44-yard field goal, 3:32. RedHawks 41–28. Drive: 7 plays, 25 yards, 3:31.

| Statistics | M–OH | MASS |
|---|---|---|
| First downs | 17 | 18 |
| Total yards | 446 | 306 |
| Rushing yards | 144 | 62 |
| Passing yards | 302 | 244 |
| Turnovers | 3 | 2 |
| Time of possession | 30:59 | 29:01 |

| Team | Category | Player | Statistics |
|---|---|---|---|
| Miami (OH) | Passing | Brett Gabbert | 12/22, 302 yards, 4 TD, 2 INT |
| Miami (OH) | Rushing | Rashad Amos | 23 rushes, 115 yards |
| Miami (OH) | Receiving | Gage Larvadain | 8 receptions, 273 yards, 3 TD |
| UMass | Passing | Carlos Davis | 22/32, 244 yards, 3 TD |
| UMass | Rushing | Kay'Ron Lynch-Adams | 16 rushes, 57 yards |
| UMass | Receiving | Mark Pope | 4 receptions, 70 yards, TD |

=== at No. 6 Penn State ===
UMass Minutemen at No. 6 Penn State Nittany Lions – Game summary

| Quarter | 1 | 2 | 3 | 4 | Total |
|---|---|---|---|---|---|
| Minutemen | 0 | 0 | 0 | 0 | 0 |
| No. 6 Nittany Lions | 7 | 21 | 21 | 14 | 63 |

at Beaver Stadium, University Park, Pennsylvania

- Date: October 14
- Game time: 3:30 p.m. EDT
- Game weather: Rain • Temperature: 47 °F (8 °C) • Wind: NE 10 MPH
- Game attendance: 105,533
- Referee: Jeffrey Servinski
- TV announcers (BTN): Mark Followill, Jake Butt, and Brooke Fletcher
- Box score, Recap

Game information
First quarter
- PSU – Daequan Hardy 56-yard punt return (Alex Felkins kick), 4:17. Nittany Lions 7–0.

Second quarter

- PSU – Drew Allar 1-yard run (Alex Felkins kick), 12:35. Nittany Lions 14–0. Drive: 8 plays, 71 yards, 3:54.
- PSU – Kaytron Allen 9-yard run (Alex Felkins kick), 6:20. Nittany Lions 21–0. Drive: 7 plays, 80 yards, 3:30.
- PSU – Tyler Warren 7-yard pass from Drew Allar (Alex Felkins kick), 1:01. Nittany Lions 28–0. Drive: 7 plays, 35 yards, 2:37.

Third quarter

- PSU – Theo Johnson 30-yard pass from Drew Allar (Alex Felkins kick), 11:29. Nittany Lions 35–0. Drive: 5 plays, 51 yards, 2:25.
- PSU – Theo Johnson 18-yard pass from Drew Allar (Alex Felkins kick), 5:12. Nittany Lions 42–0. Drive: 8 plays, 54 yards, 2:53.
- PSU – Daequan Hardy 68-yard punt return (Sander Sahaydak kick), 3:57. Nittany Lions 49–0.

Fourth quarter

- PSU – Trey Potts 2-yard run (Sander Sahaydak kick), 13:37. Nittany Lions 56–0. Drive: 4 plays, 49 yards, 1:23.
- PSU – Beau Pribula 31-yard run (Sander Sahaydak kick), 8:28. Nittany Lions 63–0. Drive: 5 plays, 80 yards, 2:17.

| Statistics | MASS | PSU |
|---|---|---|
| First downs | 9 | 28 |
| Total yards | 109 | 408 |
| Rushing yards | 64 | 246 |
| Passing yards | 45 | 162 |
| Turnovers | 1 | 2 |
| Time of possession | 32:58 | 27:02 |

| Team | Category | Player | Statistics |
|---|---|---|---|
| UMass | Passing | Taisun Phommachanh | 6/14, 25 yards |
| UMass | Rushing | Kay'Ron Lynch-Adams | 14 rushes, 31 yards |
| UMass | Receiving | George Johnson III | 2 receptions, 24 yards |
| Penn State | Passing | Drew Allar | 16/23, 162 yards, 3 TD |
| Penn State | Rushing | Nicholas Singleton | 15 rushes, 79 yards |
| Penn State | Receiving | Theo Johnson | 4 receptions, 66 yards, 2 TD |

=== at Army ===
UMass Minutemen at Army Black Knights – Game summary

| Quarter | 1 | 2 | 3 | 4 | Total |
|---|---|---|---|---|---|
| Minutemen | 13 | 0 | 8 | 0 | 21 |
| Black Knights | 0 | 7 | 0 | 7 | 14 |

at Michie Stadium, West Point, NY

- Date: October 28
- Game time: 12:00 p.m. EDT
- Game weather: Sunny • Temperature: 73 °F (23 °C) • Wind: NW 9 MPH
- Game attendance: 29,625
- Referee: Stuart Mullins
- TV announcers (CBSSN): Dave Ryan, Adam Breneman, and Tina Cervasio
- Box score, Recap

Game information
First quarter
- MASS – Kay'Ron Lynch-Adams 34-yard run (kick failed), 11:32. Minutemen 6–0. Drive: 9 plays, 75 yards, 3:28.
- MASS – Kay'Ron Lynch-Adams 9-yard run (Cameron Carson kick), 3:30. Minutemen 13–0. Drive: 9 plays, 68 yards, 5:14.

Second quarter

- ARMY – Bryson Daily 2-yard run (Quinn Maretzki kick), 2:34. Minutemen 13–7. Drive: 16 plays, 76 yards, 8:37.

Third quarter

- MASS – Kay'Ron Lynch-Adams 3-yard run (Taisun Phommachanh pass to George Johnson III), 7:33. Minutemen 21–7. Drive: 6 plays, 30 yards, 3:42.

Fourth quarter

- ARMY – Champ Harris 36-yard run (Quinn Maretzki kick), 5:01. Minutemen 21–14. Drive: 5 plays, 83 yards, 1:30.

| Statistics | MASS | ARMY |
|---|---|---|
| First downs | 19 | 19 |
| Total yards | 352 | 362 |
| Rushing yards | 231 | 204 |
| Passing yards | 121 | 158 |
| Turnovers | 0 | 3 |
| Time of possession | 31:37 | 28:23 |

| Team | Category | Player | Statistics |
|---|---|---|---|
| UMass | Passing | Taisun Phommachanh | 17/23, 121 yards |
| UMass | Rushing | Kay'Ron Lynch-Adams | 34 rushes, 234 yards, 3 TD |
| UMass | Receiving | Anthony Simpson | 7 receptions, 36 yards |
| Army | Passing | Champ Harris | 6/8, 130 yards |
| Army | Rushing | Kanye Udoh | 15 rushes, 76 yards |
| Army | Receiving | Tobi Olawole | 2 receptions, 57 yards |

=== UConn ===
UConn Huskies at UMass Minutemen – Game summary

| Quarter | 1 | 2 | 3 | 4 | Total |
|---|---|---|---|---|---|
| Huskies | 6 | 13 | 6 | 6 | 31 |
| Minutemen | 0 | 0 | 6 | 12 | 18 |

at Warren McGuirk Alumni Stadium, Hadley, Massachusetts

- Date: November 25
- Game time: 12:00 p.m. EST
- Game weather: Sunny • Temperature: 36 °F (2 °C) • Wind: SW 2 MPH
- Game attendance: 12,291
- Referee: Jerry Magallanes
- TV announcers (ESPN+): Jay Burnham, Andy Gresh, and Matt Goldstein
- Box score, Recap

Game information
First quarter
- CONN – Mumu Bin-Wahad 45-yard interception return (kick failed), 10:04. Huskies 6–0.

Second quarter

- CONN – Joe McFadden 31-yard field goal, 13:42. Huskies 9–0. Drive: 6 plays, 15 yards, 1:27.
- CONN – Joe McFadden 30-yard field goal, 8:46. Huskies 12–0. Drive: 7 plays, 33 yards, 2:29.
- CONN – Victor Rosa 17-yard run (Joe McFadden kick), 6:02. Huskies 19–0. Drive: 3 plays, 27 yards, 1:14.

Third quarter

- MASS – Gino Campiotti 10-yard pass from Taisun Phommachanh (pass failed), 11:58. Huskies 19–6. Drive: 6 plays, 37 yards, 2:50.
- CONN – Cam Edwards 4-yard run (pass failed), 1:08. Huskies 25–6. Drive: 9 plays, 70 yards, 5:45.

Fourth quarter

- MASS – Kay'Ron Lynch-Adams 1-yard run (pass failed), 11:52. Huskies 25–12. Drive: 6 plays, 73 yards, 1:33.
- CONN – Cam Edwards 8-yard run (pass failed), 3:34. Huskies 31–12. Drive: 12 plays, 77 yards, 8:12.
- MASS – Kay'Ron Lynch-Adams 1-yard run (pass failed), 2:03. Huskies 31–18. Drive: 4 plays, 78 yards, 1:25.

| Statistics | CONN | MASS |
|---|---|---|
| First downs | 24 | 18 |
| Total yards | 414 | 289 |
| Rushing yards | 240 | 59 |
| Passing yards | 174 | 230 |
| Turnovers | 1 | 3 |
| Time of possession | 37:36 | 22:24 |

| Team | Category | Player | Statistics |
|---|---|---|---|
| UConn | Passing | Ta'Quan Roberson | 16/28, 174 yards |
| UConn | Rushing | Cam Edwards | 19 rushes, 102 yards, 2 TD |
| UConn | Receiving | Cameron Ross | 3 rec, 52 yards |
| UMass | Passing | Taisun Phommachanh | 18/30, 230 yards, TD |
| UMass | Rushing | Kay'Ron Lynch-Adams | 18 rushes, 51 yards, 2 TD |
| UMass | Receiving | Anthony Simpson | 6 rec, 107 yards |

== Personnel ==
UMass 2023 Roster

- Don Brown
  Head coach
- Alex Miller
  Associate head coach/Offensive line
- Steve Casula
  Offensive coordinator/Quarterbacks
- Keith Dudzinski
  Defensive coordinator/Linebackers
- Valdamar Brower
  Defensive line
- Mike McCray
  Outside linebackers
- Damian Mincey
  Running backs
- Matt Layman
  Tight ends
- Michael Livingston
  Defensive backs
- Matt Zanellato
  Wide receivers
