= 2023 Georgia State Panthers football team =

College football team

2023 Georgia State Panthers football

Famous Idaho Potato Bowl champion

Famous Idaho Potato Bowl, W 45–22 vs. Utah State
- Conference: Sun Belt Conference
- East Division
- Record: 7–6 (3–5 Sun Belt)
- Head coach: Shawn Elliott (7th season)
- Offensive coordinator: Trent McKnight (2nd season)
- Offensive scheme: Spread
- Defensive coordinator: Chad Staggs (1st season)
- Base defense: 4–2–5
- Home stadium: Center Parc Stadium

2023 Sun Belt Conference football standings
	Conf.			Overall
Team	W		L	W		L
East Division
James Madison* x	7	–	1	11	–	2
Appalachian State y	6	–	2	9	–	5
Coastal Carolina	5	–	3	8	–	5
Old Dominion	5	–	3	6	–	7
Georgia State	3	–	5	7	–	6
Marshall	3	–	5	6	–	7
Georgia Southern	3	–	5	6	–	7
West Division
Troy xy$	7	–	1	11	–	3
Texas State	4	–	4	8	–	5
Arkansas State	4	–	4	6	–	7
South Alabama	4	–	4	7	–	6
Louisiana	3	–	5	6	–	7
Southern Miss	2	–	6	3	–	9
Louisiana–Monroe	0	–	8	2	–	10
Championship: Troy 49, Appalachian State 23
$ – Conference champion; x – Division champion/co-champions; y – Championship game participant; * – Ineligible for postseason play due to FCS-to-FBS transition rules

The 2023 Georgia State Panthers football team represented Georgia State University as a member of the Sun Belt Conference during the 2023 NCAA Division I FBS football season. The Panthers were led by seventh-year head coach Shawn Elliott and played their home games at Center Parc Stadium in Atlanta.

After a win against UConn on September 9, Georgia State became 2–0 for the first time since the 2019 season. One week later, on October 16, the program improved to 3–0 for the first time in its history after beating Charlotte on the road, 41–25. The victory against Charlotte featured the longest play in GSU program history, a 97-yard TD pass from quarterback Darren Grainger to WR Robert Lewis. Following another victory the following week at Coastal Carolina, GSU earned its first 4–0 start in program history, as well as its first vote in a national college football poll (coaches poll).

== Preseason ==
=== Media poll ===
In the Sun Belt preseason coaches' poll, the Panthers were picked to finish in sixth place in the East division.

Offensive lineman Travis Glover was named to the preseason All-Sun Belt first team. Defensive lineman Javon Denis, linebackers Jontrey Hunter and Jordan Veneziale, and defensive back Bryquice Brown were named to the second team.

== Schedule ==
The football schedule was announced February 24, 2023.

Date	Time	Opponent	Site	TV	Result	Attendance
August 31	7:00 p.m.	No. 21 (FCS) Rhode Island*	Center Parc Stadium; Atlanta, GA	ESPN+	W 42–35	15,546
September 9	7:00 p.m.	UConn*	Center Parc Stadium; Atlanta, GA	ESPN+	W 35–14	15,186
September 16	6:00 p.m.	at Charlotte*	Jerry Richardson Stadium; Charlotte, NC	ESPN+	W 41–25	14,410
September 21	7:30 p.m.	at Coastal Carolina	Brooks Stadium; Conway, SC	ESPN	W 30–17	15,248
September 30	7:00 p.m.	Troy	Center Parc Stadium; Atlanta, GA	ESPN+	L 7–28	16,536
October 14	7:00 p.m.	Marshall^{†}	Center Parc Stadium; Atlanta, GA	ESPN2	W 41–24	16,718
October 21	8:00 p.m.	at Louisiana	Cajun Field; Lafayette, LA	ESPNU	W 20–17	20,044
October 26	7:30 p.m.	at Georgia Southern	Paulson Stadium; Statesboro, GA (rivalry)	ESPN2	L 27–44	23,389
November 4	3:30 p.m.	James Madison	Center Parc Stadium; Atlanta, GA	ESPN2	L 14–42	15,320
November 11	2:00 p.m.	Appalachian State	Center Parc Stadium; Atlanta, GA	ESPN+	L 14–42	14,260
November 18	8:00 p.m.	at No. 15 LSU*	Tiger Stadium; Baton Rouge, LA	ESPN2	L 14–56	100,212
November 25	2:00 p.m.	at Old Dominion	S.B. Ballard Stadium; Norfolk, VA	ESPN+	L 24–25	15,717
December 23	3:30 p.m.	vs. Utah State	Albertsons Stadium; Boise, ID (Famous Idaho Potato Bowl)	ESPN	W 45–22	12,168
*Non-conference game; ^{†}Homecoming; Rankings from AP Poll and CFP Rankings released prior to game; All times are in Eastern time

== Game summaries ==
=== No. 21 (FCS) Rhode Island ===
Game One – (FCS) No. 21 Rhode Island Rams (0–0) vs Georgia State Panthers (0–0)

Quarter	1	2	3	4	Total
(FCS) No. 21 Rams	0	14	14	7	35
Panthers	14	7	14	7	42

at Center Parc Stadium • Atlanta, Georgia

- Date: August 31, 2023
- Game time: 7:00 p.m. EST
- Game weather: Sunny
- Game attendance: 15,546
- Referee: Marshall Lewis
- TV: ESPN+

Game information

First quarter

- (13:36) GSU – Robert Lewis 39-yard pass from Darren Grainger, Liam Rickman kick (Drive: 4 plays, 76 yards, 1:24; Georgia State 0–7)
- (4:15) GSU – Marcus Carroll 9-yard run, Liam Rickman kick (Drive: 13 plays, 80 yards, 4:43; Georgia State 0–14)

Second quarter

- (14:10) URI – John Erby 20-yard pass from Kasim Hill, Ty Groff kick (Drive: 12 plays, 75 yards, 5:05; Georgia State 7–14)
- (11:31) GSU – Tailique Williams 42-yard pass from Darren Grainger, Liam Rickman kick (Drive: 6 plays, 67 yards, 2:39; Georgia State 7–21)
- (1:40) URI – Gabe Sloat 15-yard pass from Kasim Hill, Ty Groff kick (Drive: 5 plays, 30 yards, 1:37; Georgia State 14–21)

Third quarter

- (14:12) URI – Darius Savedge 63-yard pass from Kasim Hill, Ty Groff kick (Drive: 3 plays, 75 yards, 0:48; Tied 21–21)
- (8:02) URI – Marquis Buchanan 28-yard pass from Kasim Hill, Ty Groff kick (Drive: 9 plays, 70 yards, 4:27; Rhode Island 28–21)
- (6:21) GSU – Marcus Carroll 23-yard run, Liam Rickman kick (Drive: 5 plays, 65 yards, 1:41; Tied 28–28)
- (1:30) GSU – Gavin Pringle 21-yard interception, Liam Rickman kick (Drive: Georgia State 28–35)

Fourth quarter

- (8:16) GSU – Marcus Carroll 12-yard run, Liam Rickman kick (Drive: 4 plays, 83 yards, 1:31; Georgia State 28–42)
- (6:27) URI – Kasim Hill 5-yard run, Ty Groff kick (Drive: 3 plays, 79 yards, 1:49; Georgia State 35–42)

Win Probability

Line

Over/Under

Statistics	URI	GSU
First downs	22	20
Total yards	520	424
Rushing yards	112	231
Passing yards	408	193
Passing: Comp–Att–Int	24–40–2	16–20–0
Time of possession	36:19	23:41

Team	Category	Player	Statistics
Rhode Island	Passing	Kasim Hill	24/40, 408 yards, 4 TD, 2 INT
Rhode Island	Rushing	Deon Silas	10 carries, 50 yards
Rhode Island	Receiving	Marquis Buchanan	2 receptions, 101 yards, TD
Georgia State	Passing	Darren Grainger	16/20, 193 yards, 2 TD
Georgia State	Rushing	Marcus Carroll	23 carries, 184 yards, 3 TD
Georgia State	Receiving	Robert Lewis	7 receptions, 97 yards, TD

=== UConn ===
Game Two – UConn Huskies (0–1) vs Georgia State Panthers (1–0)

Quarter	1	2	3	4	Total
Huskies	0	0	0	14	14
Panthers	7	14	7	7	35

at Center Parc Stadium • Atlanta, Georgia

- Date: September 9, 2023
- Game time: 7:00 p.m. EST
- Game weather: Sunny, 80 °F (27 °C)
- Game attendance: 15,186
- Referee: Scott Broadway
- TV announcers (ESPN+): Matt Stewart (play-by-play) and Sam Crenshaw (color analyst)

Game information

First quarter

- GSU – Grainger, Darren 65 yd run (Rickman, Liam kick), 8:40. Panthers 7–0. Drive: 4 plays, 82 yards, TOP 01:37

Second quarter

- GSU – Lewis, Robert 9 yd pass from Grainger, Darren (Rickman, Liam kick), 5:22. Panthers 14–0. Drive: 6 plays, 46 yards, TOP 01:41
- GSU – Carroll, Marcus 2 yd run (Rickman, Liam kick), 0:23. Panthers 21–0. Drive: 9 plays, 63 yards, TOP 02:54

Third quarter

- GSU – Carroll, Marcus 3 yd run (Rickman, Liam kick), 4:07. Panthers 28–0. Drive: 15 plays, 92 yards, TOP 07:30

Fourth quarter

- UCONN – Clercius, Kevens 11 yd pass from Roberson, Ta'Quan (McFadden, Joe kick), 9:16. Panthers 28–7. Drive: 10 plays, 76 yards, TOP 03:05
- GSU – Carroll, Marcus 39 yd run (Rickman, Liam kick), 6:26. Panthers 35–7. Drive: 1 plays, 39 yards, TOP 00:07
- UCONN – Buckman, Brett 32 yd pass from Roberson, Ta'Quan (McFadden, Joe kick), 3:57. Panthers 35–14. Drive: 8 plays, 80 yards, TOP 02:29

Win Probability

Line

Over/Under

Statistics	UCONN	GSU
First downs	19	19
Total yards	326	394
Rushing yards	50	250
Passing yards	276	144
Turnovers	3	1
Time of possession	32:32	27:28

Team	Category	Player	Statistics
UConn	Passing	Ta'Quan Roberson	19/30, 216 yds, 2 TDs, 1 INT
UConn	Rushing	Victor Rosa	10 att, 17 yds
UConn	Receiving	Brett Buckman	9 receptions, 93 yds, 1 TD
Georgia State	Passing	Darren Grainger	15/26, 144 yds, 1 TD
Georgia State	Rushing	Darren Grainger	12 att, 145 yds, 1 TD
Georgia State	Receiving	Ja'Cyais Credle	3 receptions, 45 yds

=== at Charlotte ===
Game Three – Georgia State Panthers (2–0) vs Charlotte 49ers (1–1)

Quarter	1	2	3	4	Total
Panthers	7	13	14	7	41
49ers	0	10	15	0	25

at Jerry Richardson Stadium • Charlotte, North Carolina

- Date: September 16, 2023
- Game time: 6:00 p.m. EST
- Game weather: 83 °F (28 °C) • Weather: Sunny• Wind: 9 NE MPH
- Game attendance: 14,410
- Referee: Javarro Edwards
- TV announcers (ESPN+): Alex Perlman, Reginald Walker Jr., Smacker Miles

Game information

First quarter
Second quarter
Third quarter
Fourth quarter

Win Probability

Line

Over/Under

Statistics	GSU	UNC
First downs	23	18
Total yards	568	356
Rushing yards	102	88
Passing yards	466	268
Turnovers	0	2
Time of possession	31:32	28:28

Team	Category	Player	Statistics
Georgia State	Passing	Darren Grainger	27–33, 466 YDS, 3 TD
Georgia State	Rushing	Marcus Carroll	20 CAR, 67 YDS, 1 TD
Georgia State	Receiving	Robert Lewis	6 REC, 220 YDS, 2 TD
Charlotte	Passing	Trexler Ivey	20–28, 257 YDS, 1 TD, 1 INT
Charlotte	Rushing	Jalon Jones	6 CAR, 80 YDS, 1 TD
Charlotte	Receiving	Jack Hestera	7 REC, 109 YDS, 1 TD

=== at Coastal Carolina ===
Game Four – Georgia State Panthers (3–0) vs Coastal Carolina Chanticleers (2–1)

Quarter	1	2	3	4	Total
Panthers	7	10	3	10	30
Chanticleers	3	0	7	7	17

at Brooks Stadium • Conway, South Carolina

- Date: September 21, 2023
- Game time: 7:30 p.m. EST
- TV announcers (ESPN): Matt Barrie (play-by-play) and Dan Mullen (analyst)

Game information

First quarter
Second quarter
Third quarter
Fourth quarter

Win Probability

Line

Over/Under

Statistics	GSU	CCU
First downs		
Total yards		
Rushing yards		
Passing yards		
Turnovers		
Time of possession		

Team	Category	Player	Statistics
Georgia State	Passing		
Georgia State	Rushing		
Georgia State	Receiving		
Coastal Carolina	Passing		
Coastal Carolina	Rushing		
Coastal Carolina	Receiving		

=== Troy ===
Game Five – Troy Trojans (2–2) vs Georgia State Panthers (4–0)

Quarter	1	2	3	4	Total
Trojans	3	3	15	7	28
Panthers	0	7	0	0	7

at Center Parc Stadium • Atlanta, Georgia

- Date: September 30, 2023
- Game time: 7:00 p.m. EST
- Game attendance: 16,536
- TV: ESPN+

Game information

First quarter
Second quarter
Third quarter
Fourth quarter

Win Probability

Line

Over/Under

Statistics	TROY	GSU
First downs		
Total yards		
Rushing yards		
Passing yards		
Turnovers		
Time of possession		

Team	Category	Player	Statistics
Troy	Passing		
Troy	Rushing		
Troy	Receiving		
Georgia State	Passing		
Georgia State	Rushing		
Georgia State	Receiving		

=== Marshall ===
Game Six – Marshall Thundering Herd (4–1) vs Georgia State Panthers (4–1)

Quarter	1	2	3	4	Total
Thundering Herd	7	10	7	0	24
Panthers	14	13	0	14	41

at Center Parc Stadium • Atlanta, Georgia

- Date: October 14, 2023
- Game time: 7:00 p.m.
- Game weather: Sunny • Temperature: 70 °F (21 °C)
- Game attendance: 16,718
- Referee: Jeremy Parker
- TV announcers (ESPN2): Roy Philpot (play-by-play), Roddy Jones (analyst), Taylor McGregor (sideline)

Game information

First quarter

- (13:03) GSU – Darren Grainger 24 yard run, Liam Rickman kick (Drive: 6 plays, 75 yards, 1:57; Georgia State 7–0)
- (10:30) MRSH – Rasheen Ali 2 yard run, Rece Verhoff kick (Drive: 6 plays, 70 yards, 2:33; Tied 7–7)
- (6:50) GSU – Izaiah Guy 4 yard return of blocked punt, Liam Rickman kick (Georgia State 14–7)

Second quarter

- (13:17) GSU – Liam Rickman 34 yard field goal (Drive: 12 plays, 64 yards, 6:32; Georgia State 17–7)
- (8:02) MRSH – Rece Verhoff 21 yard field goal (Drive: 10 plays, 71 yards, 5:15; Georgia State 17–10)
- (2:47) GSU – Liam Rickman 39 yard field goal (Drive: 10 plays, 53 yards, 5:15; Georgia State 20–10)
- (1:19) GSU – Tailique Williams 74 yard pass from Darren Grainger, Liam Rickman kick (Drive: 2 plays, 81 yards, 0:18; Georgia State 27–10)
- (0:23) MRSH – Rasheen Ali 2 yard run, Rece Verhoff kick (Drive: 9 plays, 75 yards, 0:56; Georgia State 27–17)

Third quarter

- (0:00) MRSH – Rasheen Ali 65 yard pass from Cam Fancher, Rece Verhoff kick (Drive: 3 plays, 71 yards, 1:20; Georgia State 27–24)

Fourth quarter

- (11:02) GSU – Darren Grainger 2 yard run, Liam Rickman kick (Drive: 8 plays, 75 yards, 3:58; Georgia State 34–24)
- (1:42) GSU – Marcus Carroll 2 yard run, Liam Rickman kick (Drive: 13 plays, 83 yards, 6:17; Georgia State 41–24)

Win Probability

Line

Over/Under

Statistics	MRSH	GSU
First downs	23	25
Total yards	457	474
Rushing yards	156	240
Passing yards	301	234
Turnovers	1	0
Time of possession	24:43	35:17

Team	Category	Player	Statistics
Marshall	Passing	Cam Fancher	27/34, 301 yards, TD
Marshall	Rushing	Rasheen Ali	19 carries, 103 yards, 2 TD
Marshall	Receiving	Rasheen Ali	4 receptions, 71 yards, TD
Georgia State	Passing	Darren Grainger	21/31, 234 yards, TD
Georgia State	Rushing	Marcus Carroll	28 carries, 159 yards, TD
Georgia State	Receiving	Tailique Williams	6 receptions, 129 yards, TD

=== at Louisiana ===
Game Seven – Georgia State Panthers (5–1) vs Louisiana Ragin' Cajuns (4–2)

Quarter	1	2	3	4	Total
Panthers	0	20	0	0	20
Ragin' Cajuns	0	7	10	0	17

at Cajun Field • Lafayette, Louisiana

- Date: October 21, 2023
- Game time: 7:00 p.m. EST
- Game weather: 79 °F (26 °C) • Weather: Clear • Wind: S 9 MPH
- Game attendance: 20,044
- Referee: Scott Broadway
- TV announcers (ESPNU): Courtney Lyle (play-by-play) and Hutson Mason (analyst)

Game information

First quarter

No scoring plays

Second quarter

- (13:07) GSU – Ahmon Green 24-yard pass from Darren Grainger, Liam Rickman PAT failed (Drive: 7 plays, 75 yards, 1:53; Georgia State 6–0)
- (9:49) GSU – Ahmon Green 3-yard pass from Darren Grainger, Isaac Kone kick (Drive: 7 plays, 73 yards, 1:57; Georgia State 13–0)
- (4:23) GSU – Mikele Colasurdo 3-yard rush, Isaac Kone kick (Drive: 10 plays, 68 yards, 4:59; Georgia State 20–0)
- (0:30) LA – Jacob Kibodi 3-yard rush, Kenneth Almendares kick (Drive: 5 plays, 27 yards, 0:53; Georgia State 20–7)

Third quarter

- (9:29) LA – Kenneth Almendares 23-yard field goal (Drive: 10 plays, 69 yards, 5:31; Georgia State 20–14)
- (2:01) LA – Terrance Carter 2-yard pass from Zeon Chriss, Kenneth Almendares kick (Drive: 9 plays, 54 yards, 4:55; Georgia State 20–17)

Fourth quarter

No scoring plays

Win Probability

Line

Over/Under

Statistics	GSU	ULL
First downs	16	15
Total yards	343	289
Rushing yards	129	165
Passing yards	214	124
Turnovers	2	1
Time of possession	27:48	32:12

Team	Category	Player	Statistics
Georgia State	Passing	Darren Grainger	17/22, 211 yards, 2 TDs
Georgia State	Rushing	Marcus Carroll	26 carries, 110 yards
Georgia State	Receiving	Tailique Williams	6 receptions, 81 yards
Louisiana	Passing	Zeon Chriss	14/28, 106 yards, 1 TD, 1 INT
Louisiana	Rushing	Zeon Chriss	17 carries, 119 yards
Louisiana	Receiving	Jacob Bernard	3 receptions, 30 yards

=== at Georgia Southern ===
Game Eight – Georgia State Panthers (6–1) vs Georgia Southern Eagles (5–2)

Quarter	1	2	3	4	Total
Panthers	0	0	0	0	0
Eagles	0	0	0	0	0

at Paulson Stadium • Statesboro, Georgia

- Date: October 26, 2023
- Game time: 7:30 p.m. EST
- Game attendance: 23,389
- TV announcers (ESPN2): Courtney Lyle (play-by-play) and Hutson Mason (analyst)

Game information

First quarter
Second quarter
Third quarter
Fourth quarter

Win Probability

Line

Over/Under

Statistics	GSU	GASO
First downs		
Total yards		
Rushing yards		
Passing yards		
Turnovers		
Time of possession		

Team	Category	Player	Statistics
Georgia State	Passing		
Georgia State	Rushing		
Georgia State	Receiving		
Georgia Southern	Passing		
Georgia Southern	Rushing		
Georgia Southern	Receiving		

=== James Madison ===
Game Nine – James Madison Dukes (8–0) vs Georgia State Panthers (6–2)

Quarter	1	2	3	4	Total
Dukes	0	0	0	0	0
Panthers	0	0	0	0	0

at Center Parc Stadium • Atlanta, Georgia

- Date: November 4, 2023
- Game time: 3:30 p.m. EST
- Game attendance: 15,320
- TV announcers (ESPN2): Beth Mowins (play-by-play) and Kirk Morrison (analyst)

Game information

First quarter
Second quarter
Third quarter
Fourth quarter

Win Probability

Line

Over/Under

Statistics	JMU	GSU
First downs		
Total yards		
Rushing yards		
Passing yards		
Turnovers		
Time of possession		

Team	Category	Player	Statistics
James Madison	Passing		
James Madison	Rushing		
James Madison	Receiving		
Georgia State	Passing		
Georgia State	Rushing		
Georgia State	Receiving		

=== Appalachian State ===
Game Ten – Appalachian State Mountaineers (5–4) vs Georgia State Panthers (6–3)

Quarter	1	2	3	4	Total
Mountaineers	0	0	0	0	0
Panthers	0	0	0	0	0

at Center Parc Stadium • Atlanta, Georgia

- Date: November 11, 2023
- Game time: 2:00 p.m. EST
- Game attendance: 14,260
- TV announcers (ESPN+): Matt Stewart (play-by-play) and Sam Crenshaw (analyst)

Game information

First quarter
Second quarter
Third quarter
Fourth quarter

Win Probability

Line

Over/Under

Statistics	APP	GSU
First downs		
Total yards		
Rushing yards		
Passing yards		
Turnovers		
Time of possession		

Team	Category	Player	Statistics
Appalachian State	Passing		
Appalachian State	Rushing		
Appalachian State	Receiving		
Georgia State	Passing		
Georgia State	Rushing		
Georgia State	Receiving		

=== at No. 15 LSU ===
Game Eleven – Georgia State Panthers (6–4) vs No. 15 LSU Tigers (7–3)

Quarter	1	2	3	4	Total
Panthers	7	7	0	0	14
No. 15 Tigers	14	21	7	14	56

at Tiger Stadium • Baton Rouge, Louisiana

- Date: November 18, 2023
- Game time: 8:00 p.m. EST
- Game attendance: 100,212
- TV announcers (ESPN2): Roy Philpott (play-by-play) and Roddy Jones (analyst)

Game information

First quarter
Second quarter
Third quarter
Fourth quarter

Win Probability

Line

Over/Under

Statistics	GSU	LSU
First downs		
Total yards		
Rushing yards		
Passing yards		
Turnovers		
Time of possession		

Team	Category	Player	Statistics
Georgia State	Passing		
Georgia State	Rushing		
Georgia State	Receiving		
LSU	Passing		
LSU	Rushing		
LSU	Receiving		

=== at Old Dominion ===
Game Twelve – Georgia State Panthers (6–5) vs Old Dominion Monarchs (5–6)

Quarter	1	2	3	4	Total
Panthers	0	0	0	0	0
Monarchs	0	0	0	0	0

at S.B. Ballard Stadium • Norfolk, Virginia

- Date: November 25, 2023
- Game time: 2:00 p.m. EST
- Game attendance: 15,717
- TV: ESPN+

Game information

First quarter
Second quarter
Third quarter
Fourth quarter

Win Probability

Line

Over/Under

Statistics	GSU	ODU
First downs		
Total yards		
Rushing yards		
Passing yards		
Turnovers		
Time of possession		

Team	Category	Player	Statistics
Georgia State	Passing		
Georgia State	Rushing		
Georgia State	Receiving		
Old Dominion	Passing		
Old Dominion	Rushing		
Old Dominion	Receiving		

=== vs. Utah State (Famous Idaho Potato Bowl) ===
Game Thirteen – Georgia State Panthers (6–6) vs Utah State Aggies (6–6) (Famous Idaho Potato Bowl)

Quarter	1	2	3	4	Total
Panthers	21	10	7	7	45
Aggies	14	0	0	8	22

at Albertsons Stadium • Boise, Idaho

- Date: December 23, 2023
- Game time: 3:30 p.m. EST
- Game weather: Sunny • Temperature: 39 °F (4 °C) • Wind: 15 mph (24 km/h) NW
- Game attendance: 12,168
- Referee: Jeremy Valentine
- TV announcers (ESPN): Chris Cotter (play-by-play), Mark Herzlich (analyst), and Morgan Uber (sideline)
- Box score

Game information

First quarter

- (7:36) GSU – Darren Grainger 1 yard run, Liam Rickman kick (Drive: 10 plays, 68 yards, 4:34; Georgia State 7–0)
- (6:15) USU – Jalen Royals 35 yard pass from Levi Williams, Elliott Nimrod kick (Drive: 4 plays, 50 yards, 1:21; Tied 7–7)
- (3:57) GSU – Darren Grainger 1 yard run, Liam Rickman kick (Drive: 5 plays, 75 yards, 2:18; Georgia State 14–7)
- (3:41) USU – Davon Booth 65 yard run, Elliott Nimrod kick (Drive: 2 plays, 65 yards, 0:16; Tied 14–14)
- (0:15) GSU – Tailique Williams 27 yard pass from Darren Grainger, Liam Rickman kick (Drive: 7 plays, 75 yards, 3:26; Georgia State 21–14)

Second quarter

- (7:30) GSU – Liam Rickman 31 yard field goal (Drive: 4 plays, -3 yards, 1:32; Georgia State 24–14)
- (1:17) GSU – Cadarrius Thompson 23 yard pass from Darren Grainger, Liam Rickman kick (Drive: 9 plays, 80 yards, 3:20; Georgia State 31–14)

Third quarter

- (6:02) GSU – Cadarrius Thompson 37 yard pass from Darren Grainger, Liam Rickman kick (Drive: 9 plays, 80 yards, 4:26; Georgia State 38–14)

Fourth Q=quarter

- (9:18) GSU – Freddie Brock 5 yard run, Liam Rickman kick (Drive: 5 plays, 71 yards, 2:54; Georgia State 45–14)
- (4:48) USU – Terrell Vaughn 2 yard pass from McCae Hillstead, Jalen Royals two-point pass conversion from McCae Hillstead (Drive: 11 plays, 75 yards, 4:30; Georgia State 45–22)

Win Probability

Line

Over/Under

Statistics	GSU	USU
First downs	24	18
Total yards	643	347
Rushing yards	386	159
Passing yards	257	188
Turnovers	1	1
Time of possession	36:12	23:48

Team	Category	Player	Statistics
Georgia State	Passing	Darren Grainger	19/22, 257 yards, 3 TD
Georgia State	Rushing	Freddie Brock	24 carries, 276 yards, TD
Georgia State	Receiving	Cadarrius Thompson	5 receptions, 117 yards, 2 TD
Utah State	Passing	Levi Williams	12/21, 131 yards, TD, INT
Utah State	Rushing	Davon Booth	4 carries, 71 yards, TD
Utah State	Receiving	Terrell Vaughn	8 receptions, 86 yards, TD
