= Ta'Quan Roberson =

American football player (born 2000)

Profile
- Position: Quarterback

Personal information
- Born: February 14, 2000 (age 26); Orange, New Jersey, U.S.
- Listed height: 6 ft 0 in (1.83 m)
- Listed weight: 194 lb (88 kg)

Career information
- High school: DePaul Catholic (Wayne, New Jersey)
- College: Penn State (2019–2021); UConn (2022–2023); Kansas State (2024); Buffalo (2025)
- Stats at ESPN

Ta'Quan Michael Roberson (born February 14, 2000) is an American football quarterback. He played college football for the Penn State Nittany Lions, the UConn Huskies, the Kansas State Wildcats, and the Buffalo Bulls.

== Early life ==
Born in Orange, New Jersey, and raised in West Orange, New Jersey, Roberson played prep football at DePaul Catholic High School in Wayne, New Jersey, leading the team as quarterback to multiple state title games. Coming out of high school, he was rated as a three star recruit, where he held offers from schools such as Rutgers, UNC, Virginia Tech, Kentucky, Wake forest, Boston College, Maryland, Syracuse, and Penn State, where he ultimately committed to play college football for the Penn State Nittany Lions.

== College career ==
=== Penn State ===
During his first two seasons in 2019 and 2020, he played in just two games, throwing one incomplete pass, and rushing once for a loss of one. In week seven of the 2021 season, Roberson entered the game after starter Sean Clifford went down with an injury, where he struggled going seven for twenty-one on his pass attempts for 34 yards and two interceptions, as the Nittany Lions were upset by Iowa. He finished the 2021 season, completing 11 of his 28 passes for 85 yards and a touchdown, with two interceptions, while also rushing 12 times for 24 yards. After the conclusion of the season, he entered his name into the NCAA transfer portal.

=== UConn ===
Roberson transferred to play for the UConn Huskies. Heading into the 2022 season, he was named the team's starting quarterback. In his first collegiate start in week one of the 2022 season, Roberson went down with a season ending knee injury after a five yard rush on the second drive of the game, ending his season. He entered the 2023 season as the team's backup but after a season ending injury to starter Joe Fagnano, he stepped into the team's starting role in week two, where he completed 19 of 30 pass attempts for 216 yards and two touchdowns with one interception against Georgia State. In week six, he completed 15 of his 29 passes for 215 yards and two touchdowns, as he helped the Huskies to their first win of the season over Rice. Roberson finished the 2023 season as the Huskies main starting quarterback, where he completed 58.3% of his passes for 2,075 yards and 12 touchdowns with six interceptions while rushing for 120 yards and two scores. After the conclusion of the 2023 season, he decided to enter his name into the NCAA transfer portal.

=== Kansas State ===
Roberson transferred to play for the Kansas State Wildcats. In week seven of the 2024 season, he entered the game briefly, after starter Avery Johnson went down with an injury, where he completed two of his three passes for 14 yards, including picking up a big third down conversion, in a victory versus Colorado. Roberson finished the 2024 season, completing three of his seven pass attempts for 18 yards. After the conclusion of the season, he once again decided to enter his name into the NCAA transfer portal.

=== Buffalo ===
Roberson transferred to play for the Buffalo Bulls.

=== Statistics ===
Season	Team	Games			Passing								Rushing			
Season	Team	GP	GS	Record	Cmp	Att	Pct	Yds	Y/A	TD	Int	Rtg	Att	Yds	Avg	TD
2019	Penn State	1	0	—	0	1	0.0	0	0.0	0	0	0.0	1	-1	-1.0	0
2020	Penn State	1	0	—	0	0	0.0	0	0.0	0	0	0.0	0	0	0.0	0
2021	Penn State	4	0	—	11	28	39.3	85	3.0	1	2	62.3	12	24	2.0	0
2022	UConn	1	1	0–1	1	2	50.0	10	5.0	0	0	92.0	3	8	2.7	1
2023	UConn	11	10	3−7	197	338	58.3	2,075	6.1	12	6	118.0	46	120	2.6	2
2024	Kansas State	6	0	—	3	7	42.9	18	2.6	0	0	64.5	1	7	7.0	0
2025	Buffalo	11	11	5–6	206	357	57.7	2,520	7.1	17	12	126.0	82	111	1.4	3
Career		35	22	8–14	418	733	57.0	4,708	6.4	30	20	119.0	145	269	1.9	6

== Professional career ==
Pre-draft measurables
Height	Weight	Arm length	Hand span	Wingspan	40-yard dash	10-yard split	20-yard split	20-yard shuttle	Three-cone drill	Vertical jump	Broad jump	Bench press
5 ft 11 7/8 in (1.83 m)	194 lb (88 kg)	31 3/8 in (0.80 m)	8 3/4 in (0.22 m)	6 ft 3 3/8 in (1.91 m)	4.83 s	1.76 s	2.71 s	4.53 s	7.32 s	31.5 in (0.80 m)	9 ft 7 in (2.92 m)	16 reps
All values from Pro Day
