= Jackson Mitchell =

American football player (born 2001)

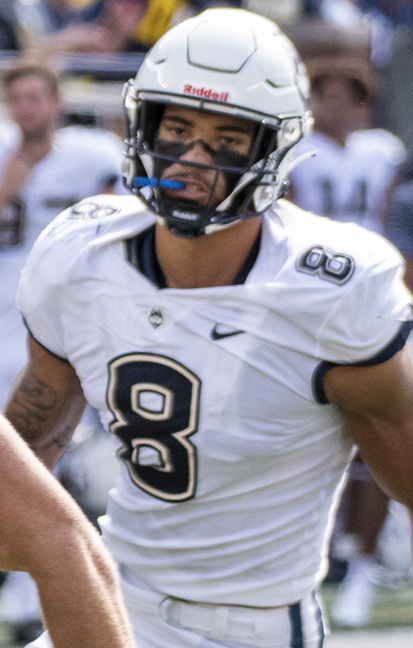
- Mitchell with UConn in 2022

Colorado State Rams
- Title: Assistant Special Teams/Assistant Outside Linebackers

Personal information
- Born: January 23, 2001 (age 25); Ridgefield, Connecticut, U.S.
- Listed height: 6 ft 2 in (1.88 m)
- Listed weight: 235 lb (107 kg)

Career information
- High school: Ridgefield
- College: UConn (2019–2023)
- NFL draft: 2024: undrafted

Career history

Playing
- Carolina Panthers (2024)*; Las Vegas Raiders (2024)*; Carolina Panthers (2024)*; Las Vegas Raiders (2025)*
- * Offseason or practice squad member only

Coaching
- UConn (2025) Assistant linebackers coach; Colorado State (2026–present) Assistant special teams/assistant outside linebackers coach
- Stats at Pro Football Reference

Jackson Mitchell (born January 23, 2001) is an American professional football linebacker. He played college football for the UConn Huskies before being signed by the Panthers as an undrafted free agent.

== Early life ==
Mitchell attended high school at Ridgefield. In Mitchell's junior season, he hauled in 80 receptions for 1,124 yards and 13 touchdowns, as well as notching 38 tackles, two sacks, two fumble recoveries, and three interceptions. Coming out of high school, Mitchell was rated as a two-star recruit where he decided to commit to play college football for the UConn Huskies.

== College career ==
In week seven of the 2019 season, Mitchell recorded eight tackles in a loss to Tulane. Mitchell finished his freshman season in 2019 with 65 tackles with two being for a loss, half a sack, a pass deflection, and a fumble recovery. During the 2020 season, Mitchell did not play as the Huskies season was canceled due to the COVID-19 Pandemic. In week three of the 2021 season, Mitchell notched a career-high 16 tackles versus Army. During the 2021 season, Mitchell posted 120 tackles with six and a half being for a loss, three forced fumbles, and an interception. In week ten of the 2022 season, Mitchell tallied 12 tackles with one being for a loss, a sack, an interception, a forced fumble, and a fumble recovery, as he helped the Huskies beat Boston College 13-3. In week twelve, Mitchell notched nine tackles, and a fumble recovery which he returned for a touchdown, as helped UConn upset #19 Liberty. During the 2022 season, Mitchell notched 140 tackles, with nine and a half being for a loss, four and a half sacks, three pass deflections, an interception, two forced fumbles, and five fumble recoveries which led the nation. For his performance on the 2022 season, Mitchell was named a semifinalist for the Chuck Bednarik Award. In week six of the 2023 season, Mitchell recovered a fumble which he returned for a touchdown versus Rice. Mitchell finished the 2023 season totaling 113 tackles with seven being for a loss, a sack, an interception, a forced fumble, a fumble recovery, and a touchdown.

== Professional career ==
Pre-draft measurables
Height	Weight	Arm length	Hand span	40-yard dash	10-yard split	20-yard split	20-yard shuttle	Three-cone drill	Vertical jump	Broad jump	Bench press
6 ft 1 3/8 in (1.86 m)	225 lb (102 kg)	30 1/2 in (0.77 m)	9 3/4 in (0.25 m)	4.85 s	1.68 s	2.78 s	4.22 s	7.36 s	34.0 in (0.86 m)	9 ft 5 in (2.87 m)	17 reps
All values from Pro Day

=== Carolina Panthers ===
Mitchell signed with the Carolina Panthers as an undrafted free agent on May 10, 2024. He was waived on August 16.

=== Las Vegas Raiders ===
On August 17, 2024, Mitchell was claimed off waivers by the Las Vegas Raiders. He was waived on August 27.

=== Carolina Panthers (second stint) ===
On October 1, 2024, Mitchell signed with the Carolina Panthers practice squad. He was released on November 5.

On December 17, 2024, Mitchell signed with the Memphis Showboats of the United Football League (UFL). However, the next day, the Panthers signed Mitchell to their practice squad.

=== Las Vegas Raiders (second stint) ===
On January 13, 2025, Mitchell signed a reserve/future contract with the Las Vegas Raiders. He was waived by Las Vegas on April 25.

== Coaching career ==
Mitchell would begin his coaching career at his former school the University of Connecticut under former coach Jim Mora for the 2025 season as an assistant linebackers coach. He would follow Jim Mora to Colorado State University as an assistant special teams/assistant outside linebackers coach.
