= Cam Ross =

American football player (born 2001)

Profile
- Position: Wide receiver

Personal information
- Born: August 16, 2001 (age 25)
- Listed height: 5 ft 10 in (1.78 m)
- Listed weight: 186 lb (84 kg)

Career information
- High school: St. John's College (Washington, D.C.)
- College: UConn (2019–2023); James Madison (2024); Virginia (2025)
- NFL draft: 2026: undrafted

Career history
- Denver Broncos (2026)*
- * Offseason or practice squad member only

Awards and highlights
- Third-team All-Sun Belt (2024)

Cameron Ross (born August 16, 2001) is an American professional football wide receiver. He played college football for the UConn Huskies, James Madison Dukes, and Virginia Cavaliers. Ross was signed by the Broncos as an undrafted free agent in 2026.

== Early life ==
Ross attended St. John's College High School in Washington, D.C. Coming out of high school, he committed to play college football for the UConn Huskies.

== College career ==
=== UConn ===
As a freshman in 2019, Ross hauled in 60 passes for 723 yards and four touchdowns. He missed the entirety of the 2020 season, as UConn did not play due to the COVID-19 pandemic. Over the next two seasons in 2021 and 2022, Ross only played in five games, due to several season-ending injuries. He returned in 2023, hauling in 44 passes for 552 yards. After the conclusion of the season, Ross entered the NCAA transfer portal.

=== James Madison ===
Ross transferred to play for the James Madison Dukes. In his lone season with the Dukes in 2024, he hauled in 37 receptions for 443 yards and three touchdowns. After the conclusion of the season, he once again entered the NCAA transfer portal. As a return specialist, he was named to the All-Sun Belt third-team.

=== Virginia ===
Ross transferred to play for the Virginia Cavaliers. In week one of the 2025 season, he hauled in seven passes for 124 yards and a touchdown, while also returning a kickoff 100-yards for a touchdown in a victory versus Coastal Carolina. Ross finished the 2025 season with 53 receptions for 543 yards and two touchdowns.

== Professional career ==
Pre-draft measurables
Height	Weight	Arm length	Hand span	Wingspan	40-yard dash	10-yard split	20-yard split	20-yard shuttle	Three-cone drill	Vertical jump	Broad jump	Bench press
5 ft 9 7/8 in (1.77 m)	186 lb (84 kg)	30 in (0.76 m)	8 3/4 in (0.22 m)	6 ft 0 1/4 in (1.84 m)	4.42 s	1.57 s	2.51 s	4.27 s	7.00 s	33.5 in (0.85 m)	10 ft 1 in (3.07 m)	13 reps
All values from Pro Day

After not being selected in the 2026 NFL draft, Ross signed with the Denver Broncos as an undrafted free agent. On August 30, 2026, he was waived by the Broncos as a part of final roster cuts. On October 6, Ross was re-signed to the Broncos' practice squad. On November 3, he was released.
