= Davon Booth =

American football player (born 2002)

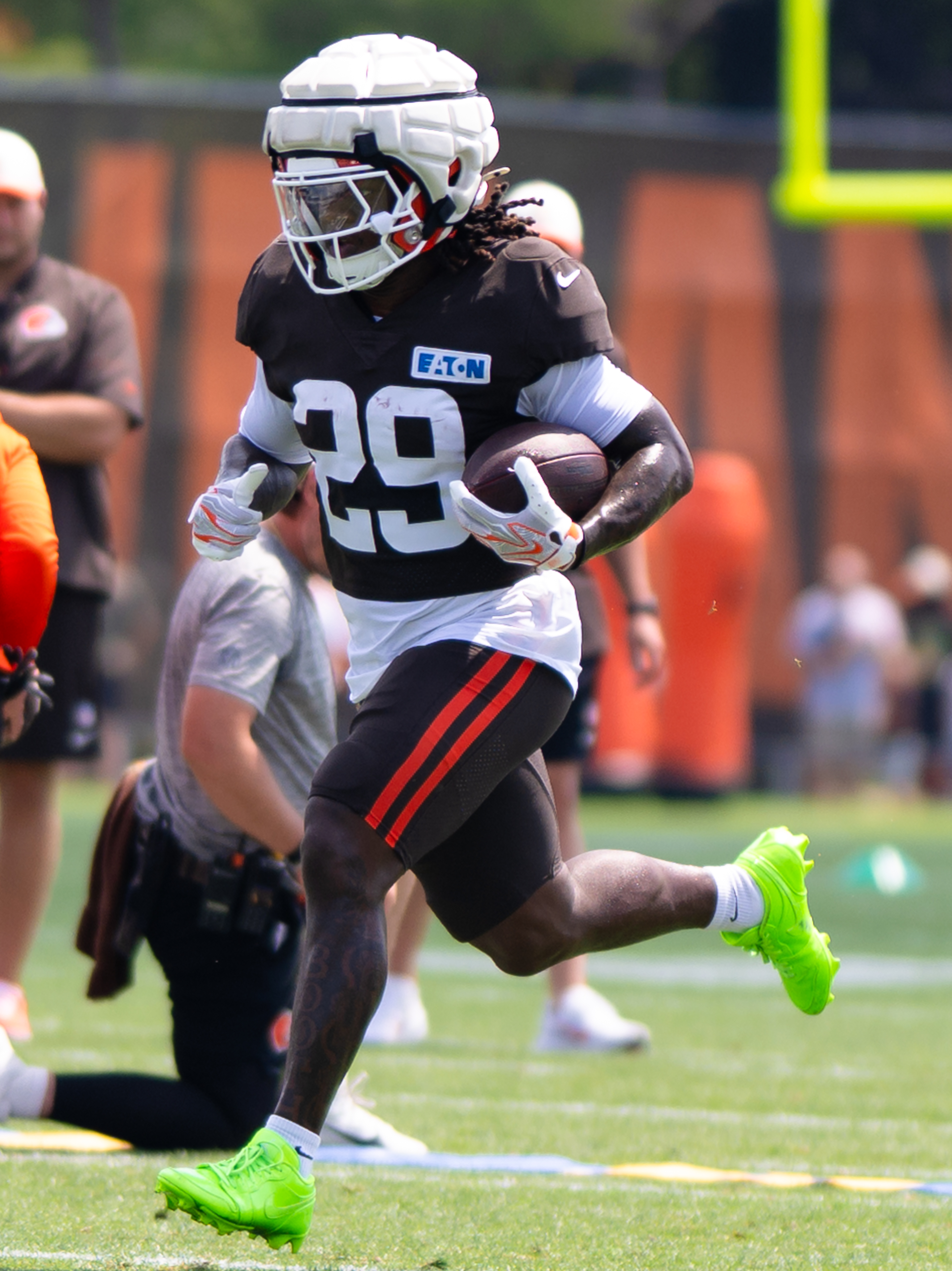
- Booth with the Cleveland Browns in 2026

No. 36 – Indianapolis Colts
- Position: Running back
- Roster status: Practice squad

Personal information
- Born: January 23, 2002 (age 24)
- Listed height: 5 ft 9 in (1.75 m)
- Listed weight: 192 lb (87 kg)

Career information
- High school: El Monte (El Monte, California)
- College: Cerritos (2021–2022); Utah State (2023); Mississippi State (2024–2025)
- NFL draft: 2026: undrafted

Career history
- Cleveland Browns (2026)*; Indianapolis Colts (2026–present)*
- * Offseason or practice squad member only

Awards and highlights
- Second-team All-SEC (2024)
- Stats at Pro Football Reference

Davon Booth (born January 23, 2002) is an American professional football running back for the Indianapolis Colts of the National Football League (NFL). He played college football for the Mississippi State Bulldogs, the Utah State Aggies, and at Cerritos College.

== Early life ==
Booth attended El Monte High School in El Monte, California, and committed to play college football at Cerritos College.

== College career ==
=== Cerritos ===
During his two-year career at Cerritos from 2021 to 2022, Booth ran for 2,006 yards and 15 touchdowns on 345 carries, while also hauling in 33 passes for 350 yards and three touchdowns.

=== Utah State ===
Booth committed to play for the Utah State Aggies. In 2023, he ran for 805 yards and six touchdowns, while averaging 6.7 yards per carry. After the conclusion of the season, Booth entered the NCAA transfer portal.

=== Mississippi State ===
Booth transferred to play for the Mississippi State Bulldogs. In 2024, he ran for 759 yards and five touchdowns on 152 carries, while also hauling in 13 passes for 164 yards and four touchdowns. After the conclusion of the 2024 season, Booth declared for the 2025 NFL draft, but he later withdrew his name and returned to the Bulldogs after receiving an extra year of eligibility. In his final season in 2025, he rushed for 552 yards and nine touchdowns, while also recording 165 receiving yards. After the conclusion of the season, Booth declared for the 2026 NFL draft.

== Professional career ==
Pre-draft measurables
Height	Weight	Arm length	Hand span	Wingspan	40-yard dash	10-yard split	20-yard split	20-yard shuttle	Three-cone drill	Vertical jump	Broad jump
5 ft 8 3/4 in (1.75 m)	192 lb (87 kg)	30 in (0.76 m)	9 1/4 in (0.23 m)	5 ft 9 7/8 in (1.77 m)	4.46 s	1.62 s	2.56 s	4.51 s	7.53 s	32.5 in (0.83 m)	9 ft 11 in (3.02 m)
All values from Pro Day

=== Cleveland Browns ===
After not being selected in the 2026 NFL draft, Booth signed with the Cleveland Browns as an undrafted free agent. On August 30, he was waived by Cleveland as a part of final roster cuts.

=== Indianapolis Colts ===
On September 1, 2026, Booth signed with the Indianapolis Colts' practice squad.
