= Jalen Royals =

American football player (born 2003)

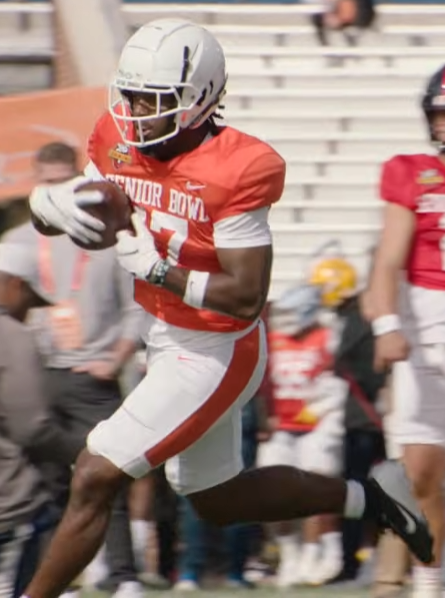
- Royals at the 2025 Senior Bowl

No. 11 – Kansas City Chiefs
- Position: Wide receiver
- Roster status: Active

Personal information
- Born: February 18, 2003 (age 23)
- Listed height: 6 ft 0 in (1.83 m)
- Listed weight: 195 lb (88 kg)

Career information
- High school: Hillgrove (Powder Springs, Georgia)
- College: Georgia Military (2021); Utah State (2022–2024)
- NFL draft: 2025: 4th round, 133rd overall pick

Career history
- Kansas City Chiefs (2025–present)

Awards and highlights
- First-team All-Mountain West (2023); Second-team All-Mountain West (2024)

Career NFL statistics as of Week 2, 2026
- Receptions: 4
- Receiving yards: 10
- Receiving touchdowns: 1
- Return yards: 30
- Stats at Pro Football Reference

Jalen Royals (born February 18, 2003) is an American professional football wide receiver for the Kansas City Chiefs of the National Football League (NFL). He played college football for the Georgia Military Bulldogs and Utah State Aggies. Royals was selected by the Chiefs in the fourth round of the 2025 NFL draft.

== Early life ==
Royals attended Hillgrove High School in Powder Springs, Georgia, where he lettered in football, basketball and track & field. As a senior, Royals had 26 receptions for 455 yards and four touchdowns. He committed to play college football at Georgia Military College.

== College career ==
=== Georgia Military ===
As a freshman in 2021, Royals recorded seven catches for 92 yards and two touchdowns in 11 games played. After the season, Royals transferred to Utah State.

=== Utah State ===
In 2022, Royals played 12 games and made his first career start against Boise State but did not record any stats during the season.

In 2023, Royals played all 12 games and recorded 68 receptions for 1,023 yards and 15 touchdowns, averaging 15.0 yards per catch. He was ranked second on the team in receptions, and his 15 touchdown receptions set a new single-season school record. Royals was named to the Biletnikoff Award watchlist, as well as the first-team Mountain West Conference.

During the 2024 season, Royals had 55 receptions for 834 yards and six touchdowns.

== Professional career ==
Pre-draft measurables
Height	Weight	Arm length	Hand span	Wingspan	40-yard dash	10-yard split	20-yard split	20-yard shuttle	Three-cone drill	Vertical jump	Broad jump	Bench press
6 ft 0 in (1.83 m)	205 lb (93 kg)	30 1/8 in (0.77 m)	9 1/2 in (0.24 m)	6 ft 1 3/4 in (1.87 m)	4.42 s	1.49 s	2.56 s	4.25 s	6.94 s	36.0 in (0.91 m)	10 ft 1 in (3.07 m)	13 reps
All values from NFL Combine/Pro Day

Royals was selected by the Kansas City Chiefs in the fourth round (133rd overall) of the 2025 NFL draft. As a rookie, he appeared in seven games, mainly in a special teams role prior to Week 18.

In Week 2 of the 2026 season against the Indianapolis Colts, Royals scored his first career touchdown on a one–yard reception from Patrick Mahomes.
