= 2023 Colorado State Rams football team =

American college football season

2023 Colorado State Rams football
- Conference: Mountain West Conference
- Record: 5–7 (3–5 MW)
- Head coach: Jay Norvell (2nd season)
- Offensive coordinator: Matt Mumme (2nd season)
- Offensive scheme: Air raid
- Defensive coordinator: Freddie Banks (2nd season)
- Base defense: 4–2–5
- Home stadium: Canvas Stadium

Uniform
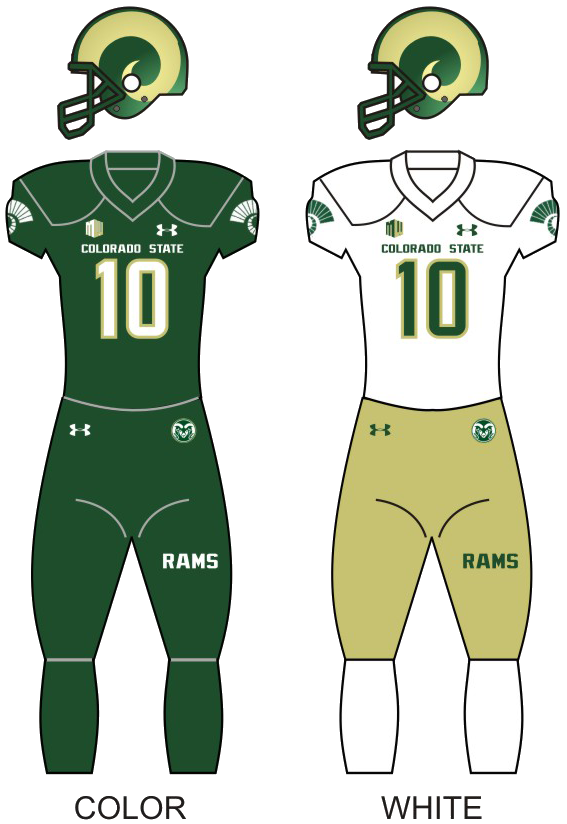

2023 Mountain West Conference football standings
	Conf.			Overall
Team	W		L	W		L
UNLV y	6	–	2	9	–	5
Boise State y$	6	–	2	8	–	6
San Jose State	6	–	2	7	–	6
Air Force	5	–	3	9	–	4
Wyoming	5	–	3	9	–	4
Fresno State	4	–	4	9	–	4
Utah State	4	–	4	6	–	7
Hawaii	3	–	5	5	–	8
Colorado State	3	–	5	5	–	7
Nevada	2	–	6	2	–	10
New Mexico	2	–	6	4	–	8
San Diego State	2	–	6	4	–	8
Championship: Boise State 44, UNLV 20
$ – Conference champion; y – Championship game participant

The 2023 Colorado State Rams football team represented Colorado State University as a member of the Mountain West Conference (MW) during the 2023 NCAA Division I FBS football season. Led by second-year head coach Jay Norvell, the Rams played home games at Canvas Stadium in Fort Collins, Colorado. The Colorado State Rams football team drew an average home attendance of 26,509 in 2023.

== Preseason ==
=== Mountain West media poll ===
The 2023 Mountain West preseason media poll was released on July 19. The Rams were predicted to finish seventh in the conference.

== Schedule ==
Date	Time	Opponent	Site	TV	Result	Attendance
September 2	5:00 p.m.	Washington State*	Canvas Stadium; Fort Collins, CO	CBSSN	L 24–50	31,497
September 16	8:00 p.m.	at No. 18 Colorado*	Folsom Field; Boulder, CO (Rocky Mountain Showdown, College GameDay, Big Noon Kickoff)	ESPN	L 35–43 ^{2OT}	53,141
September 23	5:00 p.m.	at Middle Tennessee*	Johnny "Red" Floyd Stadium; Murfreesboro, TN	ESPN+	W 31–23	19,806
September 30	5:00 p.m.	Utah Tech*	Canvas Stadium; Fort Collins, CO	MW Network	W 41–20	27,932
October 7	6:00 p.m.	at Utah State	Maverik Stadium; Logan, UT	MW Network	L 24–44	22,864
October 14	7:45 p.m.	Boise State^{†}	Canvas Stadium; Fort Collins, CO	FS1	W 31–30	34,901
October 21	5:00 p.m.	at UNLV	Allegiant Stadium; Paradise, NV	MW Network	L 23–25	22,585
October 28	5:30 p.m.	No. 19 Air Force	Canvas Stadium; Fort Collins, CO (rivalry)	CBSSN	L 13–30	22,570
November 3	6:00 p.m.	at Wyoming	War Memorial Stadium; Laramie, WY (Border War)	CBSSN	L 15–24	27,905
November 11	5:00 p.m.	San Diego State	Canvas Stadium; Fort Collins, CO	CBSSN	W 22–19	22,033
November 18	1:00 p.m.	Nevada	Canvas Stadium; Fort Collins, CO	MW Network	W 30–20	20,121
November 25	9:00 p.m.	at Hawaii	Clarence T. C. Ching Athletics Complex; Honolulu, HI	MW Network	L 24–27	11,013
*Non-conference game; ^{†}Homecoming; Rankings from AP Poll (and CFP Rankings, after November 7) - Released prior to game; All times are in Mountain time

== Game summaries ==
=== Washington State ===
Washington State Cougars (0-0) at Colorado State Rams (0-0) – Game summary

Quarter	1	2	3	4	Total
Cougars	7	10	12	21	50
Rams	3	0	0	21	24

at Canvas Stadium • Fort Collins, Colorado

- Date: September 2nd
- Game time: 5:00 p.m. MST/4:00 p.m. PST
- Game weather: Temperature: 88 °F (31 °C) • Wind: SW at 8 miles per hour (13 km/h) • Weather: Sunny
- Game attendance: 31,497
- Referee: Jeff Dahle
- TV announcers (CBSSN): Dave Ryan (play-by-play), and Corey Chavous (analyst)

Game information

First quarter

Second quarter

Third quarter

Fourth quarter

Statistics	Washington State	Colorado State
First downs	30	18
Plays–yards	556	357
Rushes–yards	90	37
Passing yards	466	320
Passing: comp–att–int	--	--
Time of possession	37:40	22:20

Team	Category	Player	Statistics
Washington State	Passing	Cam Ward	27-49,451 yards, 3 TDs
Washington State	Rushing	Cameron Ward	13 rushes, 40 yards, TD
Washington State	Receiving	Lincoln Victor	11 receptions, 168 yards
Colorado State	Passing	Brayden Fowler-Nicolosi	13-20, 210 yards, 2 TDs, 1 INT
Colorado State	Rushing	Avery Morrow	11 rushes, 29 yards
Colorado State	Receiving	Justus Ross-Simmons	5 receptions, 123 yards, TD

=== at No. 18 Colorado ===
Colorado State Rams (0-1) at No. 18 Colorado Buffaloes (2-0) – Game summary

Quarter	1	2	3	4	OT	2OT	Total
Rams	14	7	0	7	7	0	35
No 18 Buffaloes	14	0	0	14	7	8	43

at Folsom Field • Boulder, Colorado

- Date: September 16th
- Game time: 8:00 p.m. MST/7:00 p.m. PST
- Game weather: Temperature: 63 °F (17 °C) • Wind: SW at 6 miles per hour (9.7 km/h) • Weather: Clear
- Game attendance: 53,141
- Referee: Mike McCabe
- TV announcers (ESPN): Mark Jones (play-by-play), Louis Riddick (analyst), and Quint Kessenich (sideline reporter)

Game information

First quarter

Second quarter

Third quarter

Fourth quarter

Statistics	Colorado State	No. 18 Colorado
First downs	24	24
Plays–yards	87-499	72-418
Rushes–yards	102	70
Passing yards	397	348
Passing: comp–att–int	35-48-3	38-47-1
Time of possession	34:37	25:23

Team	Category	Player	Statistics
Colorado State	Passing	Brayden Fowler-Nicolosi	34-47, 367 yards, 3 TDs
Colorado State	Rushing	Kobe Johnson	15 carries, 54 yards
Colorado State	Receiving	Tory Horton	16 receptions, 133 yards, 1 TD
No. 18 Colorado	Passing	Shedeur Sanders	38-47, 348 yards, 4 TDs
No. 18 Colorado	Rushing	Dylan Edwards	10 carries, 57 yards
No. 18 Colorado	Receiving	Xavier Weaver	9 receptions, 98 yards, 1 TD

=== at Middle Tennessee ===
Colorado State Rams (0-2) at Middle Tennessee Blue Raiders (1-2) – Game summary

Quarter	1	2	3	4	Total
Rams	10	0	7	14	31
Blue Raiders	10	7	0	6	23

at Johnny "Red" Floyd Stadium • Murfreesboro, Tennessee

- Date: September 23rd
- Game time: 5:00 p.m. MST/4:00 p.m. PST
- Game attendance: 19,806
- TV announcers (ESPN+): TBD

Game information

First quarter

Second quarter

Third quarter

Fourth quarter

Statistics	Colorado State	Middle Tennessee
First downs	18	26
Plays–yards	378	430
Rushes–yards	33	151
Passing yards	345	279
Passing: comp–att–int	31-44-1	30-41-0
Time of possession	26:03	33:57

Team	Category	Player	Statistics
Colorado State	Passing	Brayden Fowler-Nicolosi	30-43, 321 yards, 2 TDs, 1 INT
Colorado State	Rushing	Avery Morrow	6 carries, 20 yards
Colorado State	Receiving	Dallin Holker	11 receptions, 112 yards, 1 TD
Middle Tennessee	Passing	Nicholas Vattiato	30-41, 279 yards, 2 TDs
Middle Tennessee	Rushing	Nicholas Vattiato	15 carries, 47 yards, 1 TD
Middle Tennessee	Receiving	Holden Willis	9 receptions, 118 yards, 1 TD

=== vs Utah Tech ===
Utah Tech Trailblazers (FCS) (1–3) at Colorado State Rams (1–2) – Game summary

Quarter	1	2	3	4	Total
Trailblazers (FCS)	3	14	3	0	20
Rams	14	7	6	14	41

at Canvas Stadium • Fort Collins, Colorado

- Date: September 30th
- Game time: 5:00 p.m. MST/4:00 p.m. PST
- Game weather: Temperature: 79 °F (26 °C) • Wind: SW at 7 miles per hour (11 km/h) • Weather: Sunny
- Game attendance: 27,932
- Referee: Christian Watson
- TV announcers (MW Network): TBD

Game information

First quarter

Second quarter

Third quarter

Fourth quarter

Statistics	Utah Tech (FCS)	Colorado State
First downs	18	25
Plays–yards	68–349	63–586
Rushes–yards	35–164	29–112
Passing yards	185	474
Passing: comp–att–int	21–33–1	27–34–2
Time of possession	34:19	25:41

Team	Category	Player	Statistics
Utah Tech (FCS)	Passing	Kobe Tracy	21/33, 185 yards, 2 TD, INT
Utah Tech (FCS)	Rushing	Ronnie Walker Jr.	20 carries, 83 yards
Utah Tech (FCS)	Receiving	Rickie Johnson	8 receptions, 69 yards
Colorado State	Passing	Brayden Fowler-Nicolosi	26/32, 462 yards, 4 TD, 2 INT
Colorado State	Rushing	Vann Schield	16 carries, 54 yards, TD
Colorado State	Receiving	Tory Horton	10 receptions, 227 yards, 3 TD

=== at Utah State ===
Colorado State Rams (2–2) at Utah State Aggies (2–3) – Game summary

Quarter	1	2	3	4	Total
Rams	17	0	0	7	24
Aggies	3	14	14	13	44

at Maverik Stadium • Logan, Utah

- Date: October 7th
- Game time: 6:00 p.m. MST/5:00 p.m. PST
- Game weather: Sunny
- Game attendance: 22,864
- Referee: Michael Cuttone
- TV announcers (MW Network): TBD

Game information

First quarter

Second quarter

Third quarter

Fourth quarter

Statistics	Colorado State	Utah State
First downs	20	28
Plays–yards	83–320	84–639
Rushes–yards	26–95	55–252
Passing yards	225	387
Passing: comp–att–int	26–57–3	19–29–2
Time of possession	27:10	32:50

Team	Category	Player	Statistics
Colorado State	Passing	Brayden Fowler-Nicolosi	26/57, 225 yards, 3 INT
Colorado State	Rushing	Kobe Johnson	17 carries, 56 yards, TD
Colorado State	Receiving	Louis Brown IV	6 receptions, 54 yards
Utah State	Passing	Cooper Legas	19/29, 387 yards, 4 TD, 2 INT
Utah State	Rushing	Davon Booth	14 carries, 141 yards, 2 TD
Utah State	Receiving	Terrell Vaughn	8 receptions, 143 yards, TD

=== vs Boise State ===
Boise State Broncos (3–3) at Colorado State Rams (2–3) – Game summary

Quarter	1	2	3	4	Total
Broncos	7	10	0	13	30
Rams	0	0	10	21	31

at Canvas Stadium • Fort Collins, Colorado

- Date: October 14th
- Game time: 7:45 p.m. MST/6:45 p.m. PST
- Game weather: Temperature: 46 °F (8 °C) • Wind: SE at 4 miles per hour (6.4 km/h) • Weather: Sunny
- Game attendance: 34,901
- Referee: Jonathan Noli
- TV announcers (FOX/FS1/FS2): TBD

Game information

First quarter

Second quarter

Third quarter

Fourth quarter

Statistics	Boise State	Colorado State
First downs	23	21
Plays–yards	66–384	75–401
Rushes–yards	43–246	21–42
Passing yards	138	359
Passing: comp–att–int	15–24–2	32–54–1
Time of possession	34:23	25:37

Team	Category	Player	Statistics
Boise State	Passing	Maddux Madsen	10/16, 110 yards, INT
Boise State	Rushing	Ashton Jeanty	31 carries, 212 yards, 3 TD
Boise State	Receiving	Ashton Jeanty	5 receptions, 42 yards
Colorado State	Passing	Brayden Fowler-Nicolosi	32/54, 359 yards, 3 TD, INT
Colorado State	Rushing	Vann Schield	15 carries, 51 yards, TD
Colorado State	Receiving	Tory Horton	10 receptions, 130 yards

=== at UNLV ===
Colorado State Rams (2–4) at UNLV Rebels (5–1) – Game summary

Quarter	1	2	3	4	Total
Rams	0	13	0	10	23
Rebels	0	3	13	9	25

at Allegiant Stadium • Las Vegas, Nevada

- Date: October 21st
- Game time: 5:00 p.m. MST/4:00 p.m. PST
- Game weather: None (Indoor stadium)
- Game attendance: 22,585
- Referee: Nolan Dumas
- TV announcers (MW Network): Steve Cofield and Matt Neverett

Game information

First quarter

None

Second quarter

- (14:15) UNLV – Jose Pizano 42-yard field goal (Drive: 9 plays, 26 yards, 3:58; UNLV 3–0)
- (7:39) CSU – Jordan Noyes 33-yard field goal (Drive: 15 plays, 59 yards, 6:31; Tied 3–3)
- (3:58) CSU – Avery Morrow 2-yard run, Jordan Noyes kick (Drive: 7 plays, 73 yards, 2:29; Colorado State 10–3)
- (0:53) CSU – Jordan Noyes 27-yard field goal (Drive: 9 plays, 70 yards, 1:43; Colorado State 13–3)

Third quarter

- (6:05) UNLV – Jose Pizano 43-yard field goal (Drive: 12 plays, 36 yards, 3:43; Colorado State 13–6)
- (3:06) UNLV – Jose Pizano 25-yard field goal (Drive: 7 plays, 19 yards, 3:01; Colorado State 13–9)
- (3:58) UNLV – Donavyn Lester 11-yard run, Jose Pizano kick (Drive: 6 plays, 66 yards, 2:15; UNLV 16–13)

Fourth quarter

- (7:36) UNLV – Jose Pizano 34-yard field goal (Drive: 16 plays, 78 yards, 7:40; UNLV 19–13)
- (3:49) CSU – Justus Ross-Simmons 20-yard pass from Brayden Fowler-Nicolosi, Jordan Noyes kick (Drive: 5 plays, 75 yards, 1:46; Colorado State 20–19)
- (1:27) UNLV – Jose Pizano 46-yard field goal (Drive: 7 plays, 46 yards, 2:17; UNLV 22–20)
- (0:44) CSU – Jordan Noyes 55-yard field goal (Drive: 7 plays, 37 yards, 0:43; Colorado State 23–22)
- (0:00) UNLV – Jose Pizano 28-yard field goal (Drive: 6 plays, 56 yards, 0:40; UNLV 25–23)

Statistics	Colorado State	UNLV
First downs	19	25
Plays–yards	64–372	82–491
Rushes–yards	31–137	46–138
Passing yards	235	353
Passing: comp–att–int	21–33–1	27–36–0
Time of possession	26:05	33:55

Team	Category	Player	Statistics
Colorado State	Passing	Brayden Fowler-Nicolosi	21/32, 235 yards, TD
Colorado State	Rushing	Vann Schield	11 carries, 90 yards
Colorado State	Receiving	Dallin Holker	4 receptions, 80 yards
UNLV	Passing	Jayden Maiava	27/36, 353 yards
UNLV	Rushing	Vincent Davis	17 carries, 63 yards, 2 TD
UNLV	Receiving	Jacob De Jesus	9 receptions, 120 yards

=== vs No. 19 Air Force ===
No. 19 Air Force Falcons (7–0) at Colorado State Rams (3–4) – Game summary

Quarter	1	2	3	4	Total
No. 19 Falcons	7	6	10	7	30
Rams	0	13	0	0	13

at Canvas Stadium • Fort Collins, Colorado

- Date: October 28th
- Game time: 5:30 p.m. MST/4:30 p.m. PST
- Game weather: Temperature: 26 °F (−3 °C) • Wind: E at 4 miles per hour (6.4 km/h) • Weather: Snow
- Game attendance: 22,570
- Referee: Michael Cuttone
- TV announcers (CBSSN): Rich Waltz (play-by-play), Aaron Taylor (analyst), and Brandon Baylor (sideline)
- ESPN – No. 19 Air Force overcomes snow, snowballs in 30-13 win over Colorado State to stay unbeaten

Game information

First quarter

- (05:03) AF TD – Zac Larrier 9-yard pass to Dane Kinamon, Matthew Dapore kick
  Drive: 12 plays, 54 yards, 6:44; Air Force 7–0

Second quarter

- (14:38) CSU TD – Brayden Fowler-Nicolosi 61-yard pass to Justus Ross-Simmons, Jordan Noyes kick
  Drive: 1 plays, 54 yards, 0:08; Tied 7–7
- (07:15) CSU FG – Jordan Noyes 40-yard field goal
  Drive: 12 plays, 67 yards, 3:44; Colorado State 10–7
- (04:00) AF TD – John Lee Eldridge III 10-yard rush, Matthew Dapore PAT failed
  Drive: 3 plays, 11 yards, 1:31; Air Force 13–10
- (00:45) CSU FG – Jordan Noyes 49-yard field goal
  Drive: 8 plays, 43 yards, 3:15; Tied 13–13

Third quarter

- (08:58) AF TD – Zac Larrier 1-yard rush, Matthew Dapore kick
  Drive: 10 plays, 75 yards, 6:02; Air Force 20–13
- (00:45) AF FG – Matthew Dapore 29-yard field goal
  Drive: 8 plays, 69 yards, 4:47; Air Force 23–13

Fourth quarter

- (08:51) AF TD – Emmanuel Michel 5-yard rush, Matthew Dapore kick
  Drive: 3 plays, 36 yards, 2:00; Air Force 30–13

Statistics	Air Force	Colorado State
First downs	18	17
Plays–yards	64–293	64–339
Rushes–yards	57–261	19–42
Passing yards	32	297
Passing: comp–att–int	4–7–0	28–45–0
Time of possession	35:58	24:02

Team	Category	Player	Statistics
Air Force	Passing	Zac Larrier	4/7, 32 yards, TD
Air Force	Rushing	Emmanuel Michel	20 carries, 130 yards, TD
Air Force	Receiving	Brandon Engel	1 reception, 14 yards
Colorado State	Passing	Brayden Fowler-Nicolosi	28/45, 297 yards, TD
Colorado State	Rushing	Vann Schield	14 carries, 53 yards
Colorado State	Receiving	Justus Ross-Simmons	8 receptions, 128 yards, TD

=== at Wyoming ===
Colorado State Rams (3–5) at Wyoming Cowboys (5–3) – Game summary

Quarter	1	2	3	4	Total
Rams	0	7	0	8	15
Cowboys	3	7	14	0	24

at War Memorial Stadium • Laramie, Wyoming

- Date: November 3rd
- Game time: 6:00 p.m. MST/5:00 p.m. PST
- Game weather: Cloudy, 49 °F (9 °C)
- Game attendance: 27,905
- Referee: Patrick Foy
- TV announcers (CBSSN): Chris Lewis, Robert Turbin, and Emily Proud

Game information

First quarter

- WYO – John Hoyland 30-yard field goal, 6:14. Cowboys 3–0. Drive: 12 plays, 66 yards, 6:21.

Second quarter

- WYO – Gunner Gentry 9-yard pass from Andrew Peasley (John Hoyland kick), 14:34. Cowboys 10–0. Drive: 8 plays, 70 yards, 4:12.
- CSU – Louis Brown IV 18-yard pass from Brayden Fowler-Nicolosi (Jordan Noyes kick), 7:45. Cowboys 10–7. Drive: 7 plays, 62 yards, 2:40.

Third quarter

- WYO – Ayir Asante 11-yard pass from Andrew Peasley (John Hoyland kick), 5:53. Cowboys 17–7. Drive: 6 plays, 38 yards, 2:20.
- WYO – Sam Scott 6-yard run (John Hoyland kick), 1:08. Cowboys 24–7. Drive: 8 plays, 46 yards, 3:41.

Fourth quarter

- CSU – Dylan Goffney 9-yard pass from Brayden Fowler-Nicolosi (Brayden Fowler-Nicolosi pass from Tory Horton), 11:07. Cowboys 24–15. Drive: 3 plays, 38 yards, 1:22.

Statistics	Colorado State	Wyoming
First downs	20	21
Plays–yards	63–274	67–334
Rushes–yards	21–54	45–194
Passing yards	220	140
Passing: comp–att–int	24–42–2	15–22–1
Time of possession	23:20	36:40

Team	Category	Player	Statistics
Colorado State	Passing	Brayden Fowler-Nicolosi	24/42, 220 yards, 2 TD, 2 INT
Colorado State	Rushing	Avery Morrow	11 carries, 39 yards
Colorado State	Receiving	Tory Horton	7 receptions, 58 yards
Wyoming	Passing	Andrew Peasley	15/22, 140 yards, 2 TD, INT
Wyoming	Rushing	Harrison Waylee	29 carries, 128 yards
Wyoming	Receiving	Alex Brown	2 receptions, 32 yards

=== vs San Diego State ===
San Diego State Aztecs (3–6) at Colorado State Rams (3–6) – Game summary

Quarter	1	2	3	4	Total
Aztecs	0	0	6	13	19
Rams	5	10	7	0	22

at Canvas Stadium • Fort Collins, Colorado

- Date: November 11th
- Game time: 5:00 p.m. MST/4:00 p.m. PST
- Game weather: Sunny, Temperature: 52 °F (11 °C), Wind: SW 5 mph
- Game attendance: 22,0333
- Referee: Kenneth Ray
- TV announcers (CBSSN): Dave Ryan (play-by-play) and Malik Zaire (analyst)

Game information

First Quarter

- (5:58) CSU - Mohamed Kamara safety; 2 plays, -7 yards, 1:29 (Colorado State 2-0)
- (2:42) CSU - Jordan Noyes 34 yard field goal; 4 plays, 1 yard, 1:27 (Colorado State 5-0)

Second Quarter

- (10:22) CSU - Jordan Noyes 30 yard field goal; 14 plays, 75 yards, 5:17 (Colorado State 8-0)
- (4:19) CSU - Dallin Holker 1 yard run (Jordan Noyes kick); 8 plays, 90 yards, 4:08 (Colorado State 15-0)

Third Quarter

- (10:10) SDSU - Gabriel Plascencia 22 yard field goal; 6 plays, 71 yards, 2:57 (Colorado State 15-3)
- (7:31) CSU - Justin Marshall 5 yard run (Jordan Noyes kick); 7 plays, 75 yards, 2:39) (Colorado State 22-3)
- (3:06) SDSU - Gabriel Plascencia 38 yard field goal; 9 plays, 45 yards, 4:18 (Colorado State 22-6)

Fourth Quarter

- (11:37) SDSU - Jalen Mayden 8 yard run (Two-point pass conversion failed); 9 plays, 46 yards, 4:26 (Colorado State 22-12)
- (2:04) SDSU - Jaylon Armstead 1 yard run (Gabriel Plascencia kick); 14 plays, 80 yards, 6:30 (Colorado State 22-19)

Statistics	San Diego State	Colorado State
First downs	17	22
Plays–yards	57–273	75–427
Rushes–yards	32–145	44–183
Passing yards	128	244
Passing: comp–att–int	19–25–0	18–31–1
Time of possession	28:13	30:18

Team	Category	Player	Statistics
San Diego State	Passing	Jalen Mayden	19–25, 128 yards
San Diego State	Rushing	Cam Davis	9 carries, 67 yards
San Diego State	Receiving	Mark Redman	4 receptions, 53 yards
Colorado State	Passing	Brayden Fowler-Nicolosi	17–30, 202 yards, 1 INT
Colorado State	Rushing	Justin Marshall	18 carries, 119 yards, 1 TD
Colorado State	Receiving	Justus Ross-Simmons	4 receptions, 89 yards

=== vs Nevada ===
Nevada Wolf Pack (2–8) at Colorado State Rams (4–6) – Game summary

Quarter	1	2	3	4	Total
Wolf Pack	3	10	7	0	20
Rams	14	6	3	7	30

at Canvas Stadium • Fort Collins, Colorado

- Date: November 18th
- Game time: 1:00 p.m. MST/12:00 p.m. PST
- Game weather: Temperature: 59 °F (15 °C) • Wind: SE at 4 miles per hour (6.4 km/h) • Weather: Sunny
- Game attendance: 20,121
- Referee: Cal McNeill
- TV: MWN

Game information

First quarter

Second quarter

Third quarter

Fourth quarter

Statistics	Nevada	Colorado State
First downs	21	23
Plays–yards	73–327	65–414
Rushes–yards	43–133	34–169
Passing yards	194	245
Passing: comp–att–int	21–30–2	15–31–1
Time of possession	35:30	24:30

Team	Category	Player	Statistics
Nevada	Passing	Brendon Lewis	18/24, 169 yards
Nevada	Rushing	Sean Dollars	20 carries, 69 yards
Nevada	Receiving	Dalevon Campbell	5 receptions, 72 yards
Colorado State	Passing	Brayden Fowler-Nicolosi	15/30, 245 yards, 2 TD, INT
Colorado State	Rushing	Justin Marshall	19 carries, 98 yards
Colorado State	Receiving	Tory Horton	6 receptions, 78 yards, TD

=== at Hawaii ===
Colorado State Rams (5–6) at Hawaii Rainbow Warriors (4–8) – Game summary

Quarter	1	2	3	4	Total
Rams	7	3	0	14	24
Rainbow Warriors	7	7	7	6	27

at Clarence T. C. Ching Athletics Complex • Honolulu, Hawaii

- Date: November 25th
- Game time: 9:00 p.m. MST/8:00 p.m. PST
- Game weather: Temperature: 77 °F (25 °C) • Wind: E at 11 miles per hour (18 km/h) • Weather: Sunny
- Game attendance: 11,013
- Referee: Christian Watson
- TV: SPEC PPV

Game information

First quarter

Second quarter

Third quarter

Fourth quarter

Statistics	Colorado State	Hawaii
First downs	21	26
Plays–yards	67–425	69–497
Rushes–yards	29–108	24–151
Passing yards	317	346
Passing: comp–att–int	26–38–1	31–45–0
Time of possession	29:12	30:48

Team	Category	Player	Statistics
Colorado State	Passing	Brayden Fowler-Nicolosi	26/38, 317 yards, 2 TD, INT
Colorado State	Rushing	Justin Marshall	20 carries, 94 yards, TD
Colorado State	Receiving	Tory Horton	9 receptions, 186 yards, TD
Hawaii	Passing	Brayden Schager	30/43, 320 yards, TD
Hawaii	Rushing	David Cordero	5 carries, 52 yards
Hawaii	Receiving	Steven McBride	6 receptions, 82 yards, TD
