= Week 0 =

Opening weekend of college football season

Week 0 (or Week Zero) refers to the opening weekend of college football games in the NCAA Division I Football Bowl Subdivision (FBS), in which a small number of games are played to begin the regular season, a week before the vast majority of teams begin their season in "Week 1". Although the FBS football season has traditionally begun on the first Saturday before Labor Day, the NCAA has sporadically awarded waivers for games to be played a week earlier in order to bring a game to a national television audience, or as part of the "Hawaii Rule" that grants teams that play a game in Hawaii, usually away games against the Rainbow Warriors, an extra regular season home game to offset travel costs. Games in Alaska, Puerto Rico and other outlying territories would nominally count towards the Hawaii Rule, but those locales do not field FBS programs, or have venues that met NCAA minimum attendance guidelines before those were abolished in 2023.

The first Week 0 game was the 1983 Kickoff Classic, in which No. 1 Nebraska defeated No. 4 Penn State, 44–6, at Giants Stadium in East Rutherford, New Jersey.

For the 2020 season, the NCAA issued a blanket waiver for Week 0 games by any team, in order to allow for scheduling flexibility amid the COVID-19 pandemic. However, no Division I FBS members wound up playing in a Week 0 game in 2020.

This list includes only games that involve at least one FBS school. Two special events in the second-level NCAA Division I Football Championship Subdivision (FCS), the FCS Kickoff and MEAC/SWAC Challenge, currently take place during Week 0. Starting in 2026, all FCS teams will be allowed to play during Week 0 in most years.

In September 2026 the NCAA's FBS oversight committee approved moving up week 1 to what is currently the week that is week 0 while giving teams another bye week beginning in 2027. It is unclear if Week 0 games would still be played following the schedule change.

== Results ==
Week 0 games since 2002:

Date	Winner	Score	Loser	Score	Location
August 22, 2002	Colorado State	35	Virginia	29	Scott Stadium; Charlottesville, Virginia (Jim Thorpe Classic)
August 23, 2002	No. 25 Wisconsin	23	Fresno State	21	Camp Randall Stadium; Madison, Wisconsin (John Thompson Foundation Classic)
August 24, 2002	No. 3 Florida State	38	Iowa State	31	Arrowhead Stadium; Kansas City, Missouri (Eddie Robinson Classic)
August 24, 2002	NC State	34	New Mexico	14	Carter–Finley Stadium; Raleigh, North Carolina (BCA Classic)
August 24, 2002	No. 13 Ohio State	45	Texas Tech	21	Ohio Stadium; Columbus, Ohio (Pigskin Classic)
August 25, 2002	No. 16 Virginia Tech	63	Arkansas State	7	Lane Stadium; Blacksburg, Virginia (Hispanic College Fund Football Classic)
August 23, 2003	No. 7 Kansas State	42	California	28	KSU Stadium; Manhattan, Kansas (BCA Classic)
August 23, 2003	San Jose State	29	Grambling State (Note: FCS/Div I-AA team.)	0	Spartan Stadium; San Jose, California (Literacy Classic)
August 28, 2004	Miami (OH)	49	Indiana State	0	Yager Stadium; Oxford, Ohio
August 28, 2004	No. 1 USC	24	Virginia Tech	13	FedEx Field; Landover, Maryland (BCA Classic)
August 26, 2016	California	51	Hawaii	31	ANZ Stadium; Sydney, Australia (Sydney Cup)
August 26, 2017	BYU	20	Portland State	6	LaVell Edwards Stadium; Provo, Utah
August 26, 2017	Colorado State	58	Oregon State	27	Canvas Stadium; Fort Collins, Colorado (Note: First game at Canvas Stadium.)
August 26, 2017	No. 19 South Florida	42	San Jose State	22	CEFCU Stadium; San Jose, California
August 26, 2017	No. 14 Stanford	62	Rice	7	Sydney Football Stadium; Sydney, Australia (Sydney Cup)
August 25, 2018	Hawaii	43	Colorado State	34	Canvas Stadium; Fort Collins, Colorado
August 25, 2018	UMass	63	Duquesne	15	Warren McGuirk Alumni Stadium; Amherst, Massachusetts
August 25, 2018	Rice	31	Prairie View A&M	28	Rice Stadium; Houston, Texas
August 25, 2018	Wyoming	29	New Mexico State	7	Aggie Memorial Stadium; Las Cruces, New Mexico
August 24, 2019	No. 8 Florida	24	Miami (FL)	20	Camping World Stadium; Orlando, Florida (Camping World Kickoff)
August 24, 2019	Hawaii	45	Arizona	38	Aloha Stadium; Honolulu, Hawaii
August 28, 2021	Illinois	30	Nebraska	22	Memorial Stadium; Champaign, Illinois
August 28, 2021	Fresno State	45	UConn	0	Bulldog Stadium; Fresno, California
August 28, 2021	UCLA	44	Hawaii	10	Rose Bowl; Pasadena, California
August 28, 2021	San Jose State	45	Southern Utah	14	CEFCU Stadium; San Jose, California
August 28, 2021	UTEP	30	New Mexico State	3	Aggie Memorial Stadium; Las Cruces, New Mexico (Battle of I-10)
August 27, 2022	Northwestern	31	Nebraska	28	Aviva Stadium; Dublin, Ireland (Aer Lingus College Football Classic)
August 27, 2022	Western Kentucky	38	Austin Peay	27	Houchens Industries–L. T. Smith Stadium; Bowling Green, Kentucky
August 27, 2022	UNLV	52	Idaho State	21	Allegiant Stadium; Paradise, Nevada
August 27, 2022	Utah State	31	UConn	20	Maverik Stadium; Logan, Utah
August 27, 2022	Illinois	38	Wyoming	6	Memorial Stadium; Champaign, Illinois
August 27, 2022	Florida State	47	Duquesne	7	Doak Campbell Stadium; Tallahassee, Florida
August 27, 2022	Florida Atlantic	43	Charlotte	13	FAU Stadium; Boca Raton, Florida
August 27, 2022	North Carolina	56	Florida A&M	24	Kenan Memorial Stadium; Chapel Hill, North Carolina
August 27, 2022	North Texas	31	UTEP	13	Sun Bowl; El Paso, Texas
August 27, 2022	Nevada	23	New Mexico State	12	Aggie Memorial Stadium; Las Cruces, New Mexico
August 27, 2022	Vanderbilt	63	Hawaii	10	Ching Athletics Complex; Honolulu, Hawaii
August 26, 2023	No. 13 Notre Dame	42	Navy	3	Aviva Stadium; Dublin, Ireland (Aer Lingus College Football Classic)
August 26, 2023	Jacksonville State	17	UTEP	14	AmFirst Stadium; Jacksonville, Alabama
August 26, 2023	San Diego State	20	Ohio	13	Snapdragon Stadium; San Diego, California
August 26, 2023	UMass	41	New Mexico State	30	Aggie Memorial Stadium; Las Cruces, New Mexico
August 26, 2023	Vanderbilt	35	Hawaii	28	FirstBank Stadium; Nashville, Tennessee
August 26, 2023	No. 6 USC	56	San Jose State	28	Los Angeles Memorial Coliseum; Los Angeles, California
August 26, 2023	Louisiana Tech	22	FIU	17	Joe Aillet Stadium; Ruston, Louisiana
August 24, 2024	Georgia Tech	24	No. 10 Florida State	21	Aviva Stadium; Dublin, Ireland (Aer Lingus College Football Classic)
August 24, 2024	Montana State	35	New Mexico	31	University Stadium; Albuquerque, New Mexico
August 24, 2024	Hawaii	35	Delaware State	14	Ching Athletics Complex; Honolulu, Hawaii
August 24, 2024	SMU	29	Nevada	24	Mackay Stadium; Reno, Nevada
August 23, 2025	No. 22 Iowa State	24	No. 17 Kansas State	21	Aviva Stadium; Dublin, Ireland (Aer Lingus College Football Classic)
August 23, 2025	UNLV	38	Idaho State	31	Allegiant Stadium; Paradise, Nevada
August 23, 2025	Kansas	31	Fresno State	7	David Booth Kansas Memorial Stadium; Lawrence, Kansas
August 23, 2025	Western Kentucky	41	Sam Houston	24	Houchens Industries–L. T. Smith Stadium; Bowling Green, Kentucky
August 23, 2025	Hawaii	23	Stanford	20	Ching Athletics Complex; Honolulu, Hawaii
August 29, 2026	North Carolina	15	TCU	10	Aviva Stadium; Dublin, Ireland (Aer Lingus College Football Classic)
August 29, 2026	Virginia	34	NC State	8	Scott Stadium; Charlottesville, Virginia
August 29, 2026	No. 14 USC	42	San Jose State	26	Los Angeles Memorial Coliseum; Los Angeles, California
August 29, 2026	North Dakota State	33	Jacksonville State	7	Fargodome; Fargo, North Dakota
August 29, 2026	Eastern Michigan	28	Sacramento State	17	Rynearson Stadium; Ypsilanti, Michigan
August 29, 2026	Stanford	37	Hawaii	27	Stanford Stadium; Stanford, California
August 29, 2026	Florida State	34	New Mexico State	17	Doak Campbell Stadium; Tallahassee, Florida
August 29, 2026	Memphis	27	UNLV	21	Allegiant Stadium; Paradise, Nevada

Rankings reflect preseason AP Poll.

== See also ==
- FCS Kickoff, a Week 0 game featuring two Division I FCS teams that has been played since 2014
- MEAC/SWAC Challenge, a game featuring teams from the two historically black FCS conferences that has taken place on Week 0 since 2021
