= 2023 San Diego State Aztecs football team =

American college football season

2023 San Diego State Aztecs football
- Conference: Mountain West Conference
- Record: 4–8 (2–6 MW)
- Head coach: Brady Hoke (6th season)
- Offensive coordinator: Ryan Lindley (1st season)
- Offensive scheme: Pro-style
- Defensive coordinator: Kurt Mattix (4th season)
- Base defense: 4–2–5
- Captains: Jack Browning; Kenan Christon
- Home stadium: Snapdragon Stadium

2023 Mountain West Conference football standings
	Conf.			Overall
Team	W		L	W		L
UNLV y	6	–	2	9	–	5
Boise State y$	6	–	2	8	–	6
San Jose State	6	–	2	7	–	6
Air Force	5	–	3	9	–	4
Wyoming	5	–	3	9	–	4
Fresno State	4	–	4	9	–	4
Utah State	4	–	4	6	–	7
Hawaii	3	–	5	5	–	8
Colorado State	3	–	5	5	–	7
Nevada	2	–	6	2	–	10
New Mexico	2	–	6	4	–	8
San Diego State	2	–	6	4	–	8
Championship: Boise State 44, UNLV 20
$ – Conference champion; y – Championship game participant

The 2023 San Diego State Aztecs football team represented San Diego State University as a member of the Mountain West Conference during the 2023 NCAA Division I FBS football season. They were led by head coach Brady Hoke, who coached his sixth season with the team. The Aztecs played their home games at Snapdragon Stadium in San Diego, California.

On November 13, 2023, Hoke announced that he would retire at the end of the regular season. Hoke finished 40–32 (25–21 conference) in four seasons.

The San Diego State Aztecs football team drew an average home attendance of 24,832 in 2023.

== Schedule ==
The Mountain West Schedule was released on March 2, 2023.

Date	Time	Opponent	Site	TV	Result	Attendance
August 26	4:00 p.m.	Ohio*	Snapdragon Stadium; San Diego, CA	FS1	W 20–13	23,867
September 2	7:30 p.m.	Idaho State*	Snapdragon Stadium; San Diego, CA	CBSSN	W 36–28	22,345
September 9	4:30 p.m.	UCLA*	Snapdragon Stadium; San Diego, CA	CBS	L 10–35	32,017
September 16	12:30 p.m.	at No. 16 Oregon State*	Reser Stadium; Corvallis, OR	FS1	L 9–26	35,591
September 22	7:30 p.m.	Boise State	Snapdragon Stadium; San Diego, CA	CBSSN	L 31–34	23,374
September 30	5:00 p.m.	at Air Force	Falcon Stadium; Colorado Springs, CO	CBSSN	L 10–49	24,869
October 14	8:00 p.m.	at Hawaii	Clarence T. C. Ching Athletics Complex; Honolulu, HI	CBSSN	W 41–34	10,039
October 21	6:00 p.m.	Nevada	Snapdragon Stadium; San Diego, CA	FS2	L 0–6	27,122
November 4	4:00 p.m.	Utah State^{†}	Snapdragon Stadium; San Diego, CA	FS1	L 24–32 ^{2OT}	23,096
November 11	5:00 p.m.	at Colorado State	Canvas Stadium; Fort Collins, CO	CBSSN	L 19–22	22,033
November 18	7:30 p.m.	at San Jose State	CEFCU Stadium; San Jose, CA	CBSSN	L 13–24	16,224
November 25	7:30 p.m.	Fresno State	Snapdragon Stadium; San Diego, CA (rivalry)	FS1	W 33–18	22,000
*Non-conference game; ^{†}Homecoming; Rankings from AP Poll released prior to the game; All times are in Pacific time

== Game summaries ==
=== Ohio ===
Ohio Bobcats (0–0) vs. San Diego State Aztecs (0–0)

Quarter	1	2	3	4	Total
Bobcats	3	3	0	7	13
Aztecs	3	7	0	10	20

at Snapdragon Stadium, San Diego, California

- Date: August 26
- Game time: 4:00 p.m. PDT
- Game weather: Sunny, Temperature: 83 °F (28 °C), Wind: N 9 mph
- Game attendance: 23,867
- Referee: Christian Watson
- TV announcers (FS1): Tim Brando (play-by-play) and Spencer Tillman (analyst)

Game information

First Quarter

- (10:53) SDSU - Jack Browning 49 yard field goal; 10 plays, 44 yards, 4:07 (San Diego State 3–0)
- (4:22) OHIO - Gianni Spetic 19 yard field goal; 14 plays, 81 yards, 6:26 (Tied 3–3)

Second Quarter

- (4:44) OHIO - Gianni Spetic 40 yard field goal; 11 plays, 56 yards, 6:01 (Ohio 6–3)
- (0:00) SDSU - Mark Redman 13 yard pass from Jalen Mayden (Jack Browning kick); 7 plays, 71 yards, 0:44 (San Diego State 10–6)

Third Quarter

None

Fourth Quarter

- (13:32) SDSU - Jack Browning 21 yard field goal; 10 plays, 77 yards, 6:09 (San Diego State 13–6)
- (5:39) SDSU - Mark Redman 4 yard pass from Jalen Mayden (Jack Browning kick); 11 plays, 79 yards, 6:29 (San Diego State 20–6)
- (1:59) OHIO - Miles Cross 3 yd pass from CJ Harris (Gianni Spetic kick); 15 plays, 65 yards, 3:40 (San Diego State 20–13)

Statistics	Ohio	San Diego State
First downs	25	15
Plays–yards	84–390	58–318
Rushes–yards	31–111	31–154
Passing yards	279	164
Passing: comp–att–int	26–51–3	18–28–0
Turnovers		
Time of possession	32:36	27:24

Team	Category	Player	Statistics
Ohio	Passing	CJ Harris	18–42, 203 yards, 1 TD, 3 INT
Ohio	Rushing	Sieh Bangura	15 carries, 65 yards
Ohio	Receiving	Sam Wiglusz	10 receptions, 103 yards
San Diego State	Passing	Jalen Mayden	17–27, 164 yards, 2 TD
San Diego State	Rushing	Jaylon Armstead	8 carries, 78 yards
San Diego State	Receiving	Mark Redman	5 receptions, 62 yards, 2 TD

=== Idaho State ===
Idaho State Bengals (0–0) vs. San Diego State Aztecs (1–0) – Game summary

Quarter	1	2	3	4	Total
Bengals	3	10	0	15	28
Aztecs	10	10	9	7	36

at Snapdragon Stadium, San Diego, California

- Date: September 2
- Game time: 7:30 p.m. PDT
- Game weather: Sunny, Temperature: 74 °F (23 °C), Wind: N 6 mph
- Game attendance: 22,345
- Referee: Michael Cuttone
- TV announcers (CBSSN): Michael Grady (play-by-play) and Donte Whitner (analyst)

Game information

First quarter

- (8:49) ISU – Thomas Kopcho 32 yard field goal; 11 plays, 61 yards, 3:10 (Idaho State 3–0)
- (6:50) SDSU – Jack Browning 43 yard field goal; 6 plays, 33 yards, 1:48 (Tied 3–3)
- (2:54) SDSU – Jalen Mayden 24 yard run (Jack Browning kick); 2 plays, 32 yards, 0:44 (San Diego State 10–3)

Second quarter

- (14:50) ISU – Thomas Kopcho 33 yard field goal; 8 plays, 59 yards, 3:04 (San Diego State 10–6)
- (6:35) SDSU – Jaylon Armstead 4 yard run (Jack Browning kick); 12 plays, 68 yards, 7:12 (San Diego State 17–6)
- (1:10) SDSU – Jack Browning 41 yard field goal; 7 plays, 25 yards, 3:22 (San Diego State 20–6)
- (0:14) ISU – Christian Fredericksen 24 yard pass from Jordan Cooke (Thomas Kopcho kick); 6 plays, 65 yards, 0:50 (San Diego State 20–13)

Third quarter

- (8:48) SDSU – Team Safety; 3 plays, 2 yards, 1:05 (San Diego State 22–13)
- (6:09) SDSU – Martin Blake 3 yard run (Jack Browning kick); 5 plays, 27 yards, 2:32 (San Diego State 29–13)

Fourth quarter

- (13:34) ISU – Chedon James 8 yard pass from Hunter Hays (Hunter Hays pass to Alfred Jordan Jr. for two-point conversion); 14 plays, 80 yards, 4:59 (San Diego State 29–21)
- (6:50) SDSU – Jalen Mayden 56 yard run (Jack Browning kick); 3 plays, 70 yards, 1:22 (San Diego State 36–21)
- (0:39) ISU – Hunter Hays 2 yard run (Thomas Kopcho kick); 11 plays, 68 yards, 3:01 (San Diego State 36–28)

Statistics	Idaho State	San Diego State
First downs	24	18
Plays–yards	70–344	67–389
Rushes–yards	17–22	47–304
Passing yards	322	85
Passing: comp–att–int	31–63–3	13–20–1
Turnovers		
Time of possession	25:32	34:28

Team	Category	Player	Statistics
Idaho State	Passing	Jordan Cooke	19–42, 177 yards, 1 TD, 2 INT
Idaho State	Rushing	Hunter Hays	9 carries, 18 yards, 1 TD
Idaho State	Receiving	Christian Fredericksen	5 receptions, 66 yards, 1 TD
San Diego State	Passing	Jalen Mayden	13–19, 85 yards
San Diego State	Rushing	Jalen Mayden	8 carries, 132 yards, 2 TD
San Diego State	Receiving	Martin Blake	3 receptions, 40 yards

=== UCLA ===
UCLA Bruins (1–0) vs. San Diego State Aztecs (2–0) – Game summary

Quarter	1	2	3	4	Total
Bruins	7	21	7	0	35
Aztecs	7	3	0	0	10

at Snapdragon Stadium, San Diego, California

- Date: September 9
- Game time: 4:30 p.m. PDT
- Game weather: Sunny, Temperature: 85 °F (29 °C), Wind: N 9 mph
- Game attendance: 32,017
- Referee: Cravonne Barrett
- TV announcers (CBS): Rich Waltz (play-by-play), Aaron Taylor (analyst), and Justin Walters (sideline)

Game information

First quarter

- (7:26) UCLA – Josiah Norwood 81 yard pass from Dante Moore (R. J. Lopez kick); 1 play, 81 yards, 0:11 (UCLA 7–0)
- (2:33) SDSU – Mekhi Shaw 21 yard pass from Jalen Mayden (Jack Browning kick); 9 plays, 75 yards, 4:53 (Tied 7–7)

Second quarter

- (14:56) UCLA – Carson Steele 13 yard run (R. J. Lopez kick); 7 plays, 75 yards, 2:37 (UCLA 14–7)
- (10:21) UCLA – T. J. Harden 59 yard run (R. J. Lopez kick); 3 plays, 68 yards, 1:01 (UCLA 21–7)
- (5:03) SDSU – Jack Browning 44 yard field goal; 10 plays, 48 yards, 5:18 (UCLA 21–10)
- (1:20) UCLA – Logan Loya 24 yard pass from Dante Moore (R. J. Lopez kick); 7 plays, 85 yards, 0:56 (UCLA 28–10)

Third quarter

- (2:05) UCLA – Carsen Ryan 6 yard pass from Dante Moore (R. J. Lopez kick); 12 plays, 80 yards, 4:20 (UCLA 35–10)

Fourth quarter

None

Statistics	UCLA	San Diego State
First downs	26	17
Plays–yards	68–550	71–259
Rushes–yards	39–254	33–63
Passing yards	296	196
Passing: comp–att–int	18–29–0	20–38–3
Turnovers		
Time of possession	25:05	34:55

Team	Category	Player	Statistics
UCLA	Passing	Dante Moore	17–27, 290 yards, 3 TD
UCLA	Rushing	T. J. Harden	9 carries, 91 yards, 1 TD
UCLA	Receiving	Josiah Norwood	2 receptions, 87 yards, 1 TD
San Diego State	Passing	Jalen Mayden	19–37, 196 yards, 1 TD, 3 INT
San Diego State	Rushing	Kenan Christon	9 carries, 27 yards
San Diego State	Receiving	Mekhi Shaw	5 receptions, 54 yards, 1 TD

=== at No. 16 Oregon State ===
No. 16 Oregon State Beavers (2–0) at San Diego State Aztecs (2–1) – Game summary

Quarter	1	2	3	4	Total
Aztecs	0	3	0	6	9
No. 16 Beavers	3	9	7	7	26

at Reser Stadium, Corvallis, Oregon

- Date: September 16
- Game time: 12:30 p.m. PDT
- Game weather: Sunny, Temperature: 77 °F (25 °C), Wind: N 2 mph
- Game attendance: 35,591
- Referee: Chris Wiggins
- TV announcers (FS1): Alex Faust (play-by-play) and Petros Papadakis (analyst)

Game information

First quarter

- (7:57) OSU – Atticus Sappington 48 yard field goal; 10 plays, 60 yards, 4:48 (Oregon State 3–0)

Second quarter

- (13:36) OSU – Atticus Sappington 48 yard field goal; 11 plays, 43 yards, 3:42 (Oregon State 6–0)
- (8:32) OSU – Joshua Gray 3 yard run (Two-point run conversion failed); 6 plays, 80 yards, 2:48 (Oregon State 12–0)
- (0:44) SDSU – Jack Browning 52 yard field goal; 8 plays, 31 yards, 1:21 (Oregon State 12–3)

Third quarter

- (7:40) OSU – DJ Uiagalelei 1 yard run (Atticus Sappington kick); 7 plays, 84 yards, 3:36 (Oregon State 19–3)

Fourth quarter

- (9:01) SDSU – Jaylon Armstead 6 yard run (Two-point run conversion failed); 9 plays, 57 yards, 5:08 (Oregon State 19–9)
- (8:48) OSU – Anthony Gould 75 yard pass from DJ Uiagalelei (Atticus Sappington kick); 1 play, 75 yards, 0:13 (Oregon State 26–9)

Statistics	San Diego State	Oregon State
First downs	18	20
Plays–yards	66–326	62–475
Rushes–yards	34–70	32–191
Passing yards	256	475
Passing: comp–att–int	20–32–1	14–30–2
Turnovers		
Time of possession	33:21	26:39

Team	Category	Player	Statistics
San Diego State	Passing	Jalen Mayden	20–32, 256 yards, INT
San Diego State	Rushing	Jaylon Armstead	11 carries, 48 yards, TD
San Diego State	Receiving	Mark Redman	4 receptions, 77 yards
Oregon State	Passing	DJ Uiagalelei	14–30, 284 yards, TD, INT
Oregon State	Rushing	Damien Martinez	15 carries, 102 yards
Oregon State	Receiving	Anthony Gould	3 receptions, 97 yards, TD

=== Boise State ===
Boise State Broncos (2–1) vs. San Diego State Aztecs (2–2)

Quarter	1	2	3	4	Total
Broncos	0	17	10	7	34
Aztecs	7	10	0	14	31

at Snapdragon Stadium, San Diego, California

- Date: September 22
- Game time: 7:30 p.m. PDT
- Game weather: Cloudy, Temperature: 65 °F (18 °C), Wind: N 2 mph
- Game attendance: 23,374
- Referee: Jonathan Noli
- TV announcers (CBSSN): Rich Waltz (play-by-play), Aaron Taylor (analyst), and Justin Walters (sideline)

Game information

First Quarter

- (7:37) SDSU - Baylin Brooks 34 yard pass from Jalen Mayden (Jack Browning kick); 6 plays, 52 yards, 3:23 (San Diego State 7–0)

Second Quarter

- (11:58) BSU - Eric McAlister 25 yard pass from Taylen Green (Jonah Dalmas kick); 5 plays, 76 yards, 2:21 (Tied 7-7)
- (9:13) SDSU - Jack Browning 22 yard field goal; 6 plays, 50 yards, 2:45 (San Diego State 10-7)
- (7:13) BSU - Ashton Jeanty 58 yard run (Jonah Dalmas kick); 4 plays, 79 yards, 1:55 (Boise State 14-10)
- (2:48) SDSU - Jaylon Armstead 2 yard run (Jack Browning kick); 7 plays, 75 yards, 4:25 (San Diego State 17-14)
- (0:22) BSU - Jonah Dalmas 29 yard field goal; 11 plays, 72 yards, 2:22 (Tied 17-17)

Third Quarter

- (4:52) BSU - Jonah Dalmas 27 yard field goal; 9 plays, 68 yards, 4:19 (Boise State 20-17)
- (3:05) BSU - Taylen Green 10 yard run (Jonah Dalmas kick); 4 plays, 26 yards, 1:37 (Boise State 27-17)

Fourth Quarter

- (14:17) SDSU - Jaylon Armstead 10 yard run (Jack Browning kick); 10 plays, 92 yards, 3:43 (Boise State 27-24)
- (2:02) BSU - Ashton Jeanty 6 yard run (Jonah Dalmas kick); 11 plays, 50 yards, 4:52 (Boise State 34-24)
- (0:42) SDSU - Jalen Mayden 10 yard run (Jack Browning kick); 7 plays, 72 yards, 1:15 (Boise State 34-31)

Statistics	Boise State	San Diego State
First downs	19	22
Plays–yards	63–403	63–439
Rushes–yards	41–241	40–166
Passing yards	162	273
Passing: comp–att–int	12–22–0	17–23–0
Turnovers		
Time of possession	27:50	32:10

Team	Category	Player	Statistics
Boise State	Passing	Taylen Green	12–22, 162 yards, 1 TD
Boise State	Rushing	Ashton Jeanty	23 carries, 205 yards, 2 TD
Boise State	Receiving	Eric McAlister	5 receptions, 90 yards, 1 TD
San Diego State	Passing	Jalen Mayden	16–22, 241 yards, 1 TD
San Diego State	Rushing	Jalen Mayden	16 carries, 85 yards, 1 TD
San Diego State	Receiving	Baylin Brooks	5 receptions, 117 yards, 1 TD

=== at Air Force ===
San Diego State Aztecs (2–3) at Air Force Falcons (4–0) – Game summary

Quarter	1	2	3	4	Total
Aztecs	0	10	0	0	10
Falcons	0	21	21	7	49

at Falcon Stadium, Colorado Springs, Colorado

- Date: September 30
- Game time: 5:00 p.m. PDT
- Game weather: Sunny
- Game attendance: 24,869
- Referee: Nolan Dumas
- TV announcers (CBSSN): Rich Waltz (play-by-play), Aaron Taylor (analyst), and Tiffany Blackmon (sideline)

Game information

First quarter

None

Second quarter

- (13:34) SDSU - Joshua Nicholson 21 yard pass from Jalen Mayden (Jack Browning kick); 17 plays, 80 yards, 9:32 (San Diego State 7-0)
- (10:31) AF - Cade Harris 7 yard run (Matthew Dapore kick); 7 plays, 75 yards, 3:03 (Tied 7-7)
- (4:21) AF - Emmanuel Michel 2 yard run (Matthew Dapore kick); 9 plays, 53 yards, 5:04 (Air Force 14-7)
- (0:43) AF - Emmanuel Michel 3 yard run (Matthew Dapore kick); 6 plays, 80 yards, 2:09 (Air Force 21-7)
- (0:00) SDSU - Jack Browning 61 yard field goal; 8 plays, 31 yards, 0:43 (Air Force 21-10)

Third quarter

- (12:04) AF - Cade Harris 54 yard pass from Zac Larrier (Matthew Dapore kick); 6 plays, 75 yards, 2:56 (Air Force 28-10)
- (7:18) AF - Jared Roznos 53 yard pass from Zac Larrier (Matthew Dapore kick); 6 plays, 79 yards, 3:00 (Air Force 35-10)
- (7:09) AF - Trey Taylor 30 yard interception return (Matthew Dapore kick); 1 play, 0 yards, 0:09 (Air Force 42-10)

Fourth quarter

- (9:45) AF - Jensen Jones 4 yard run (Reagan Tubbs kick); 16 plays, 85 yards, 10:20 (Air Force 49-10)

Statistics	San Diego State	Air Force
First downs	14	24
Plays–yards	55–227	59–476
Rushes–yards	30–105	52–287
Passing yards	122	189
Passing: comp–att–int	13–25–1	6–7–0
Turnovers		
Time of possession	27:55	32:05

Team	Category	Player	Statistics
San Diego State	Passing	Jalen Mayden	13–24, 122 yards, 1 TD, 1 INT
San Diego State	Rushing	Kenan Christon	14 carries, 59 yards
San Diego State	Receiving	Mark Redman	2 receptions, 27 yards
Air Force	Passing	Zac Larrier	6–7, 189 yards, 2 TD
Air Force	Rushing	Zac Larrier	8 carries, 107 yards
Air Force	Receiving	Cade Harris	2 receptions, 82 yards, 1 TD

=== at Hawaii ===
San Diego State Aztecs (2–4) at Hawaii Rainbow Warriors (2–4) – Game summary

Quarter	1	2	3	4	Total
Aztecs	10	7	3	21	41
Warriors	0	14	10	10	34

at Clarence T. C. Ching Athletics Complex, Honolulu, Hawaii

- Date: October 14
- Game time: 8:00 p.m. PDT
- Game weather: Sunny, Temperature: 83 °F (28 °C), Wind: NE 2 mph
- Game attendance: 10,039
- Referee: Kenneth Ray
- TV announcers (CBSSN): Jordan Kent (play-by-play) and Randy Cross (analyst)

Game information

First Quarter

- (12:12) SDSU - Jack Browning 22 yard field goal; 4 plays, 8 yards, 1:58 (San Diego State 3-0)
- (4:16) SDSU - Lucky Sutton 1 yard run (Jack Browning kick); 6 plays, 43 yards, 3:16 (San Diego State 10-0)

Second Quarter

- (12:25) SDSU - Deshawn McCuin 70 yard interception return (Jack Browning kick); 4 plays, 14 yards, 1:13 (San Diego State 17-0)
- (7:49) HAW - Pofele Ashlock 17 yard pass from Brayden Schager (Matthew Shipley kick); 10 plays, 91 yards, 4:30 (San Diego State 17-7)
- (1:30) HAW - Alex Perry 8 yard pass from Brayden Schager (Matthew Shipley kick); 3 plays, 67 yards, 1:29 (San Diego State 17-14)

Third Quarter

- (8:34) HAW - Matthew Shipley 46 yard field goal; 10 plays, 64 yards, 4:47 (Tied 17-17)
- (0:56) SDSU - Jack Browning 24 yard field goal; 13 plays, 68 yards, 7:38 (San Diego State 20-17)
- (0:00) HAW - Nick Cenacle 52 yard pass from Brayden Schager (Matthew Shipley kick); 3 plays, 75 yards, 0:56 (Hawaii 24-20)

Fourth Quarter

- (13:33) SDSU - Mekhi Shaw 69 yard pass from Jalen Mayden (Jack Browning kick); 3 plays, 76 yards, 1:18 (San Diego State 27-24)
- (12:27) SDSU - Lucky Sutton 2 yard run (Jack Browning kick); 3 plays, 24 yards, 0:49 (San Diego State 34-24)
- (10:22) HAW - Landon Sims 1 yard run (Matthew Shipley kick); 3 plays, 75 yards, 2:05 (San Diego State 34-31)
- (2:11) SDSU - Jaylon Armstead 1 yard run (Jack Browning kick); 5 plays, 23 yards, 2:56 (San Diego State 41-31)
- (0:59) HAW - Matthew Shipley 47 yard field goal; 6 plays, 45 yards, 1:12 (San Diego State 41-34)

Statistics	San Diego State	Hawaii
First downs	17	19
Plays–yards	67–378	63–480
Rushes–yards	43–157	15–53
Passing yards	221	427
Passing: comp–att–int	18–24–1	29–48–1
Turnovers		
Time of possession	36:08	23:52

Team	Category	Player	Statistics
San Diego State	Passing	Jalen Mayden	18–24, 221 yards, 1 TD, 1 INT
San Diego State	Rushing	Jalen Mayden	13 carries, 53 yards
San Diego State	Receiving	Mekhi Shaw	7 receptions, 126 yards, 1 TD
Hawaii	Passing	Brayden Schager	29–47, 427 yards, 3 TD, 1 INT
Hawaii	Rushing	Nasjzae Bryant-Lelei	4 carries, 24 yards
Hawaii	Receiving	Steven McBride	5 receptions, 157 yards

=== Nevada ===
Nevada Wolf Pack (0–6) vs. San Diego State Aztecs (3–4)

Quarter	1	2	3	4	Total
Wolf Pack	3	3	0	0	6
Aztecs	0	0	0	0	0

at Snapdragon Stadium, San Diego, California

- Date: October 21
- Game time: 6:00 p.m. PDT
- Game weather: Sunny, Temperature: 72 °F (22 °C), Wind: N 9 mph
- Game attendance: 27,122
- Referee: Patrick Foy
- TV announcers (FS2): Dan Hellie (play-by-play) and Robert Smith (analyst)

Game information

First Quarter

- (7:03) NEV - Brandon Talton 39 yard field goal; 13 plays, 51 yards, 6:30 (Nevada 3–0)

Second Quarter

- (0:00) NEV - Brandon Talton 37 yard field goal; 6 plays, 46 yards, 0:50 (Nevada 6-0)

Third Quarter

None

Fourth Quarter

None

Statistics	Nevada	San Diego State
First downs	26	21
Plays–yards	61–242	53–204
Rushes–yards	39–144	39–157
Passing yards	242	204
Passing: comp–att–int	9–22–0	6–14–0
Turnovers		
Time of possession	30:14	29:46

Team	Category	Player	Statistics
Nevada	Passing	Brendon Lewis	9–22, 98 yards
Nevada	Rushing	Sean Dollars	11 carries, 49 yards
Nevada	Receiving	Dalevon Campbell	1 reception, 44 yards
San Diego State	Passing	Jalen Mayden	6–14, 47 yards
San Diego State	Rushing	Jalen Mayden	14 carries, 52 yards
San Diego State	Receiving	Mekhi Shaw	1 reception, 19 yards

=== Utah State ===
Utah State Aggies (3–5) vs. San Diego State Aztecs (3–5)

Quarter	1	2	3	4	OT	2OT	Total
Aggies	0	3	7	7	7	8	32
Aztecs	0	7	0	10	7	0	24

at Snapdragon Stadium, San Diego, California

- Date: November 4
- Game time: 4:00 p.m. PDT
- Game weather: Sunny, Temperature: 78 °F (26 °C), Wind: N 9 mph
- Game attendance: 23,096
- Referee: Cal McNeill
- TV announcers (FS1): Guy Haberman (play-by-play) and Petros Papadakis (analyst)

Game information

First Quarter

None

Second Quarter

- (14:10) SDSU - Mark Redman 9 yard pass from Jalen Mayden (Jack Browning kick); 6 plays, 88 yards, 3:18 (San Diego State 7-0)
- (10:14) USU - William Testa 24 yard field goal; 14 yards, 68 yards, 3:56 (San Diego State 7-3)

Third Quarter

- (8:43) USU - Jalen Royals 50 yard pass from Cooper Legas (William Testa kick); 9 plays, 73 yards, 3:43 (Utah State 10-7)

Fourth Quarter

- (13:40) USU - Davon Booth 19 yard run (William Testa kick); 7 plays, 92 yards, 2:25 (Utah State 17-7)
- (7:10) SDSU - Kenan Christon 10 yard pass from Jalen Mayden (Jack Browning kick); 9 plays, 79 yards, 4:08 (Utah State 17-14)
- (0:33) SDSU - Jack Browning 23 yard field goal; 9 plays, 49 yards, 1:54 (Tied 17-17)

First Overtime

- SDSU - Brionne Penny 27 yard pass from Jalen Mayden (Jack Browning kick); 2 plays, 25 yards (San Diego State 24-17)
- USU - Terrell Vaughn 18 yard pass from Cooper Legas (William Testa kick); 3 plays, 25 yards (Tied 24-24)

Second Overtime

- USU - Robert Briggs Jr. 20 yard run (Terrell Vaughn pass to Broc Lane for two-point conversion); 2 plays, 25 yards (Utah State 32-24)

Statistics	Utah State	San Diego State
First downs	20	17
Plays–yards	76–400	71–384
Rushes–yards	44–171	31–121
Passing yards	229	263
Passing: comp–att–int	23–32–0	26–40–1
Turnovers		
Time of possession	28:30	31:30

Team	Category	Player	Statistics
Utah State	Passing	Cooper Legas	11–15, 167 yards, 2 TD
Utah State	Rushing	Davon Booth	13 carries, 77 yards, 1 TD
Utah State	Receiving	Terrell Vaughn	8 receptions, 91 yards, 1 TD
San Diego State	Passing	Jalen Mayden	25–39, 265 yards, 3 TD, 1 INT
San Diego State	Rushing	Lucky Sutton	11 carries, 86 yards
San Diego State	Receiving	Kenan Christon	8 receptions, 76 yards, 1 TD

=== at Colorado State ===
San Diego State Aztecs (3–6) at Colorado State Rams (3–6) – Game summary

Quarter	1	2	3	4	Total
Aztecs	0	0	6	13	19
Rams	5	10	7	0	22

at Canvas Stadium, Fort Collins, Colorado

- Date: November 11
- Game time: 4:00 p.m. PST
- Game weather: Sunny, Temperature: 52 °F (11 °C), Wind: SW 5 mph
- Game attendance: 22,033
- Referee: Kenneth Ray
- TV announcers (CBSSN): Dave Ryan (play-by-play) and Malik Zaire (analyst)

Game information

First Quarter

- (5:58) CSU - Mohamed Kamara safety; 2 plays, -7 yards, 1:29 (Colorado State 2-0)
- (2:42) CSU - Jordan Noyes 34 yard field goal; 4 plays, 1 yard, 1:27 (Colorado State 5-0)

Second Quarter

- (10:22) CSU - Jordan Noyes 30 yard field goal; 14 plays, 75 yards, 5:17 (Colorado State 8-0)
- (4:19) CSU - Dallin Holker 1 yard run (Jordan Noyes kick); 8 plays, 90 yards, 4:08 (Colorado State 15-0)

Third Quarter

- (10:10) SDSU - Gabriel Plascencia 22 yard field goal; 6 plays, 71 yards, 2:57 (Colorado State 15-3)
- (7:31) CSU - Justin Marshall 5 yard run (Jordan Noyes kick); 7 plays, 75 yards, 2:39) (Colorado State 22-3)
- (3:06) SDSU - Gabriel Plascencia 38 yard field goal; 9 plays, 45 yards, 4:18 (Colorado State 22-6)

Fourth Quarter

- (11:37) SDSU - Jalen Mayden 8 yard run (Two-point pass conversion failed); 9 plays, 46 yards, 4:26 (Colorado State 22-12)
- (2:04) SDSU - Jaylon Armstead 1 yard run (Gabriel Plascencia kick); 14 plays, 80 yards, 6:30 (Colorado State 22-19)

Statistics	San Diego State	Colorado State
First downs	17	22
Plays–yards	57–273	75–427
Rushes–yards	32–145	44–183
Passing yards	128	244
Passing: comp–att–int	19–25–0	18–31–1
Turnovers		
Time of possession	28:13	30:18

Team	Category	Player	Statistics
San Diego State	Passing	Jalen Mayden	19–25, 128 yards
San Diego State	Rushing	Cam Davis	9 carries, 67 yards
San Diego State	Receiving	Mark Redman	4 receptions, 53 yards
Colorado State	Passing	Brayden Fowler-Nicolosi	17–30, 202 yards, 1 INT
Colorado State	Rushing	Justin Marshall	18 carries, 119 yards, 1 TD
Colorado State	Receiving	Justus Ross-Simmons	4 receptions, 89 yards

=== at San Jose State ===
San Diego State Aztecs (3–7) at San Jose State Spartans (5–5) – Game summary

Quarter	1	2	3	4	Total
Aztecs	7	3	0	3	13
Spartans	0	10	7	7	24

at CEFCU Stadium, San Jose, California

- Date: November 18
- Game time: 7:30 p.m. PST
- Game weather: Cloudy, Temperature: 64 °F (18 °C), Wind: W 6 mph
- Game attendance: 16,225
- Referee: Jon Noli
- TV announcers (CBSSN): Dave Ryan (play-by-play), Donte Whitner (analyst), and Emily Proud (sideline)

Game information

First Quarter

- (5:01) SDSU - Jaylon Armstead 1 yard run (Gabriel Plascencia kick); 13 plays, 77 yards, 7:30 (San Diego State 7-0)

Second Quarter

- (14:19) SJSU - Dominick Mazotti 10 yard pass from Chevan Cordeiro (Kyler Halvorsen kick); 10 plays, 71 yards, 5:37 (Tied 7-7)
- (3:03) SDSU - Gabriel Plascencia 46 yard field goal; 7 plays, 4 yards, 3:37 (San Diego State 10-7)
- (0:00) SJSU - Kyler Halvorsen 35 yard field goal; 10 plays, 57 yards, 3:03 (Tied 10-10)

Third Quarter

- (6:16) SJSU - Quali Conley 20 yard run (Kyler Halvorsen kick); 5 plays, 74 yards, 2:41 (San Jose State 17-10)

Fourth Quarter

- (8:54) SDSU - Gabriel Plascencia 21 yard field goal; 16 plays, 85 yards, 7:50 (San Jose State 17-13)
- (5:13) SJSU - Kairee Robinson 5 yard run (Kyler Halvorsen kick); 6 plays, 94 yards, 3:41 (San Jose State 24-13)

Statistics	San Diego State	San Jose State
First downs	18	19
Plays–yards	65–300	49–355
Rushes–yards	41–183	29–181
Passing yards	117	174
Passing: comp–att–int	15–24–2	15–20–1
Turnovers		
Time of possession	35:16	24:44

Team	Category	Player	Statistics
San Diego State	Passing	Jalen Mayden	15–24, 117 yards, 2 INT
San Diego State	Rushing	Jaylon Armstead	21 carries, 134 yards, 1 TD
San Diego State	Receiving	Phillippe Wesley II	4 receptions, 48 yards
San Jose State	Passing	Chevan Cordeiro	15–20, 174 yards, 1 TD, 1 INT
San Jose State	Rushing	Quali Conley	13 carries, 155 yards, 1 TD
San Jose State	Receiving	Isaac Jernagin	2 receptions, 56 yards

=== Fresno State ===
Fresno State Bulldogs (8–3) vs. San Diego State Aztecs (3–8)

Quarter	1	2	3	4	Total
Bulldogs	7	3	0	8	18
Aztecs	3	13	7	10	33

at Snapdragon Stadium, San Diego, California

- Date: November 25
- Game time: 7:30 p.m. PST
- Game weather: Clear, Temperature: 55 °F (13 °C), Wind: 0 mph
- Game attendance: 22,000
- Referee: Michael Cuttone
- TV announcers (FS1): Guy Haberman (play-by-play) and Will Blackmon (analyst)

Game information

First Quarter

- (9:19) FSU - Malik Sherrod 62 yard run (Dylan Lynch kick); 5 plays, 86 yards, 1:32 (Fresno State 7-0)
- (5:12) SDSU - Jack Browning 32 yard field goal; 10 plays, 62 yards, 4:03 (Fresno State 7-3)

Second Quarter

- (14:56) SDSU - Jack Browning 39 yard field goal; 8 plays, 12 yards, 4:06 (Fresno State 7-6)
- (8:03) SDSU - Jalen Mayden 70 yard run; 5 plays, 91 yards, 2:03 (San Diego State 13-7)
- (2:58) SDSU - Jack Browning 41 yard field goal; 6 plays, 24 yards, 2:59 (San Diego State 16-7)
- (0:00) FSU - Dylan Lynch 43 yard field goal; 8 plays, 48 yards, 0:45 (San Diego State 16-10)

Third Quarter

- (8:55) SDSU - Jaylon Armstead 1 yard run (Jack Browning kick); 9 plays, 51 yards, 4:35 (San Diego State 23-10)

Fourth Quarter

- (14:14) SDSU - Jack Browning 33 yard field goal; 14 plays, 59 yards, 7:23 (San Diego State 26-10)
- (10:08) FSU - Malik Sherrod 1 yard run (Jalen Moss pass from Mikey Keene for two-point conversion); 10 plays, 75 yards, 4:06 (San Diego State 26-18)
- (2:54) SDSU - Leo Kemp 5 yard pass from Jalen Mayden (Jack Browning kick); 14 plays, 78 yards, 7:06 (San Diego State 33-18)

Statistics	Fresno State	San Diego State
First downs	17	21
Plays–yards	56–341	79–415
Rushes–yards	19–151	53–226
Passing yards	190	189
Passing: comp–att–int	21–37–1	17–26–0
Turnovers		
Time of possession	19:09	40:51

Team	Category	Player	Statistics
Fresno State	Passing	Mikey Keene	21–36, 190 yards, 1 INT
Fresno State	Rushing	Malik Sherrod	15 carries, 138 yards, 2 TD
Fresno State	Receiving	Erik Brooks	5 receptions, 53 yards
San Diego State	Passing	Jalen Mayden	17–26, 189 yards, 1 TD
San Diego State	Rushing	Jalen Mayden	14 carries, 96 yards, 1 TD
San Diego State	Receiving	Cameron Harpole	3 receptions, 46 yards
