= 2023 Hawaii Rainbow Warriors football team =

American college football season

2023 Hawaii Rainbow Warriors football
- Conference: Mountain West Conference
- Record: 5–8 (3–5 MW)
- Head coach: Timmy Chang (2nd season)
- Offensive coordinator: Ian Shoemaker (2nd season)
- Co-offensive coordinator: Roman Sapolu (1st season)
- Offensive scheme: Spread
- Defensive coordinator: Jacob Yoro (3rd season)
- Co-defensive coordinator: Eti Ena (1st season)
- Base defense: 4–2–5/Desert Swarm
- Home stadium: Clarence T. C. Ching Athletics Complex

2023 Mountain West Conference football standings
	Conf.			Overall
Team	W		L	W		L
UNLV y	6	–	2	9	–	5
Boise State y$	6	–	2	8	–	6
San Jose State	6	–	2	7	–	6
Air Force	5	–	3	9	–	4
Wyoming	5	–	3	9	–	4
Fresno State	4	–	4	9	–	4
Utah State	4	–	4	6	–	7
Hawaii	3	–	5	5	–	8
Colorado State	3	–	5	5	–	7
Nevada	2	–	6	2	–	10
New Mexico	2	–	6	4	–	8
San Diego State	2	–	6	4	–	8
Championship: Boise State 44, UNLV 20
$ – Conference champion; y – Championship game participant

The 2023 Hawaii Rainbow Warriors football team represented the University of Hawaiʻi at Mānoa in the 2023 NCAA Division I FBS football season. Led by second-year coach Timmy Chang, the Rainbow Warriors played their home games at the Clarence T. C. Ching Athletics Complex as members of the Mountain West Conference. The Rainbow Warriors drew an average home attendance of 11,251 in 2023.

== Schedule ==
Date	Time	Opponent	Site	TV	Result	Attendance
August 26	1:30 p.m.	at Vanderbilt*	FirstBank Stadium; Nashville, TN	SECN	L 28–35	21,407
September 1	5:00 p.m.	Stanford*	Clarence T. C. Ching Athletics Complex; Honolulu, HI	CBSSN	L 24–37	13,739
September 9	6:00 p.m.	Albany*	Clarence T. C. Ching Athletics Complex; Honolulu, HI	SPEC PPV	W 31–20	9,485
September 16	2:00 p.m.	at No. 13 Oregon*	Autzen Stadium; Eugene, OR	P12N	L 10–55	52,779
September 23	6:00 p.m.	New Mexico State*	Clarence T. C. Ching Athletics Complex; Honolulu, HI	SPEC PPV	W 20–17	10,254
September 30	10:00 a.m.	at UNLV	Allegiant Stadium; Paradise, NV (Island Showdown Series)	SPEC PPV	L 20–44	25,328
October 14	5:00 p.m.	San Diego State	Clarence T. C. Ching Athletics Complex; Honolulu, HI	CBSSN	L 34–41	10,039
October 21	12:00 p.m.	at New Mexico	University Stadium; Albuquerque, NM	SPEC PPV	L 21–42	13,723
October 28	6:00 p.m.	San Jose State^{†}	Clarence T. C. Ching Athletics Complex; Honolulu, HI (Dick Tomey Legacy Game)	SPEC PPV	L 0–35	11,486
November 4	10:00 a.m.	at Nevada	Mackay Stadium; Reno, NV	SPEC PPV	W 27–14	15,540
November 11	6:00 p.m.	Air Force	Clarence T. C. Ching Athletics Complex; Honolulu, HI (rivalry)	SPEC PPV	W 27–13	12,742
November 18	9:00 a.m.	at Wyoming	War Memorial Stadium; Laramie, WY (rivalry)	SPEC PPV	L 9–42	18,233
November 25	6:00 p.m.	Colorado State	Clarence T. C. Ching Athletics Complex; Honolulu, HI	SPEC PPV	W 27–24	11,013
*Non-conference game; ^{†}Homecoming; Rankings from AP Poll released prior to the game; All times are in Hawaii time

== Game summaries ==
=== at Vanderbilt ===
Hawaii Rainbow Warriors at Vanderbilt Commodores

Quarter	1	2	3	4	Total
Rainbow Warriors	7	7	0	14	28
Commodores	14	7	7	7	35

at FirstBank Stadium, Nashville, TN

- Date: August 26, 2023
- Game time: 1:30 p.m.
- Game weather: 75 °F (24 °C)
- Game attendance: 21,407
- Referee: Cal McNeill
- TV announcers (SECN): Taylor Zarzour (play-by-play), Matt Stinchcomb (color) and Alyssa Lang (sideline)

Game information

First quarter

- (11:26) VAN – Patrick Smith 21-yard run (Drive: 4 plays, 32 yards, 1:22; Vanderbilt 6–0)
- (7:13) HAW – Steven McBride 9-yard pass from Brayden Schager, Matthew Shipley kick (Drive: 8 plays, 75 yards, 4:13; Hawaii 7–6)
- (7:00) VAN – Jayden McGowan 97-yard kickoff return, Quincy Skinner Jr. kick (Vanderbilt 14–7)

Second quarter

- (14:56) VAN – Will Sheppard 7-yard pass from AJ Swann, Jacob Borcila kick (Drive: 8 plays, 84 yards, 4:41; Vanderbilt 21–7)
- (13:03) HAW – Steven McBride 45-yard pass from Brayden Schager, Matthew Shipley kick (Drive: 5 plays, 68 yards, 1:45; Vanderbilt 21–14)

Third quarter

- (9:32) VAN – Will Sheppard 1-yard pass from AJ Swann, Jacob Borcila kick (Drive: 4 plays, 38 yards, 2:01; Vanderbilt 28–14)

Fourth quarter

- (14:48) VAN – London Humphreys 32-yard pass from AJ Swann, Jacob Borcila kick (Drive: 10 plays, 87 yards, 2:56; Vanderbilt 35–14)
- (11:20) HAW – Pofele Ashlock 3-yard pass from Brayden Schager, Matthew Shipley kick (Drive: 8 plays, 75 yards, 3:28; Vanderbilt 35–21)
- (4:49) HAW – Dalen Morris 1-yard run, Matthew Shipley kick (Drive: 6 plays, 67 yards, 2:18; Vanderbilt 35–28)

Top passers

- HAW – Brayden Schager – 27/35, 351 yards, 3 TD, 2 INT
- VAN – AJ Swann – 19/30, 258 yards, 3 TD

Top rushers

- HAW – Landon Sims – 9 carries, 38 yards
- VAN – Patrick Smith – 7 carries, 30 yards, TD

Top receivers

- HAW – Pofele Ashlock – 7 receptions, 127 yards, TD
- VAN – Jayden McGowan – 6 receptions, 72 yards

=== Stanford ===
Stanford Cardinal at Hawaii Rainbow Warriors

Quarter	1	2	3	4	Total
Cardinal	7	14	6	10	37
Rainbow Warriors	0	10	0	14	24

at Clarence T. C. Ching Athletics Complex, Honolulu, HI

- Date: September 1, 2023
- Game time: 5:00 p.m.
- Game weather: Sunny, 88 °F (31 °C)
- Game attendance: 13,739
- Referee: Matthew Richards
- TV announcers (CBSSN): Dave Ryan (play-by-play) and Robert Turbin (analyst)

Game information

First quarter

- (7:25) STAN – E. J. Smith 1-yard run, Joshua Karty kick (Drive: 12 plays, 72 yards, 4:17; Stanford 7–0)

Second quarter

- (14:11) HAW – Pofele Ashlock 7-yard pass from Brayden Schager, Matthew Shipley kick (Drive: 11 plays, 75 yards, 5:48; Tied 7–7)
- (12:24) STAN – Benjamin Yurosek 32-yard pass from Ashton Daniels, Joshua Karty kick (Drive: 5 plays, 75 yards, 1:47; Stanford 14–7)
- (4:25) STAN – Bryce Farrell 2-yard run, Joshua Karty kick (Drive: 11 plays, 66 yards, 5:59; Stanford 21–7)
- (0:00) HAW – Matthew Shipley 32-yard field goal (Drive: 9 plays, 65 yards, 1:03; Stanford 21–10)

Third quarter

- (11:07) STAN – Joshua Karty 25-yard field goal (Drive: 7 plays, 68 yards, 3:53; Stanford 24–10)
- (1:35) STAN – Joshua Karty 25-yard field goal (Drive: 13 plays, 75 yards, 6:28; Stanford 27–10)

Fourth quarter

- (14:52) HAW – Steven McBride 24-yard pass from Brayden Schager (Drive: 5 plays, 75 yards, 1:43; Stanford 27–16)
- (9:15) STAN – Joshua Karty 46-yard field goal (Drive: 9 plays, 47 yards, 5:37; Stanford 30–16)
- (5:30) STAN – John Humphreys 13-yard pass from Ashton Daniels, Joshua Karty kick (Drive: 3 plays, 31 yards, 1:35; Stanford 37–16)
- (1:08) HAW – Pofele Ashlock 16-yard pass from Brayden Schager, Brayden Schager two-point pass to Devon Tauaefa (Drive: 15 plays, 64 yards, 4:14; Stanford 37–24)

Top passers

- STAN – Ashton Daniels – 25/36, 248 yards, 2 TD
- HAW – Brayden Schager – 30/53, 355 yards, 3 TD

Top rushers

- STAN – Casey Filkins – 6 carries, 67 yards
- HAW – Tylan Hines – 5 carries, 5 yards

Top receivers

- STAN – Benjamin Yurosek – 9 receptions, 138 yards, TD
- HAW – Pofele Ashlock – 8 receptions, 114 yards, 2 TD

=== Albany ===
Albany Great Danes at Hawaii Rainbow Warriors

Quarter	1	2	3	4	Total
Great Danes	7	10	3	0	20
Rainbow Warriors	10	7	7	7	31

at Clarence T. C. Ching Athletics Complex, Honolulu, HI

- Date: September 9, 2023
- Game time: 6:00 p.m.
- Game attendance: 9,485
- TV: SPEC PPV

=== at No. 13 Oregon ===
Hawaii Rainbow Warriors at No. 13 Oregon Ducks

Quarter	1	2	3	4	Total
Rainbow Warriors	0	3	0	7	10
No. 13 Ducks	24	10	14	7	55

at Autzen Stadium, Eugene, OR

- Date: September 16, 2023
- Game time: 2:00 p.m.
- Game weather: Sunny • Temperature: 85 °F (29 °C) • Wind: W 3 miles per hour (4.8 km/h)
- Game attendance: 52,779
- Referee: Jeff Dahle
- TV announcers (P12N): Ted Robinson (play-by-play) and Yogi Roth (analyst)

Game information

First quarter

- 14:02 ORE - Tez Johnson 49-yard pass from Bo Nix (Camden Lewis kick) - 7-0 Oregon, Drive: 2 plays, 59 yards, 0:33
- 12:24 ORE - Camden Lewis 43-yard field goal - 10-0 Oregon, Drive: 4 plays, 5 yards, 0:51
- 5:52 ORE - Jordan James 22-yard run (Camden Lewis kick) - 17-0 Oregon, Drive: 7 plays, 91 yards, 3:30
- 0:06 ORE - Traeshon Holden 1-yard pass from Bo Nix (Camden Lewis kick) - 24-0 Oregon, Drive: 10 plays, 67 yards, 4:10

Second quarter

- 12:01 ORE - Jordan James 3-yard run (Camden Lewis kick) - 31-0 Oregon, Drive: 5 plays, 54 yards, 1:32
- 3:21 ORE - Camden Lewis 22-yard field goal - 34-0 Oregon, Drive: 13 plays, 66 yards, 6:53
- 0:00 HAW - Matthew Shipley 29-yard field goal - 34-3 Oregon, Drive: 11 plays, 63 yards, 3:21

Third quarter

- 11:30 ORE - Tez Johnson 12-yard pass from Bo Nix (Camden Lewis kick) - 41-3 Oregon, Drive: 9 plays, 67 yards, 3:30
- 1:27 ORE - Noah Whittington 34-yard run (Camden Lewis kick) - 48-3 Oregon, Drive: 4 plays, 50 yards, 1:18

Fourth quarter

- 7:46 ORE - Traeshon Holden 60-yard pass from Ty Thompson (Camden Lewis kick) - 55-3 Oregon, Drive: 6 plays, 87 yards, 2:28
- 2:28 HAW - Alex Perry 1-yard pass from Brayden Schager (Matthew Shipley kick) - 55-10 Oregon, Drive: 10 plays, 75 yards, 5:18

Top passers

- HAW – Brayden Schager – 27/43, 131 yards, TD, INT
- ORE – Bo Nix – 21/27, 247 yards, 3 TD

Top rushers

- HAW – Jordan Johnson – 4 carries, 39 yards
- ORE – Noah Whittington – 5 carries, 80 yards, TD

Top receivers

- HAW – Pofele Ashlock – 8 receptions, 47 yards
- ORE – Troy Franklin – 4 receptions, 83 yards

=== New Mexico State ===
New Mexico State Aggies at Hawaii Rainbow Warriors

Quarter	1	2	3	4	Total
Aggies	7	10	0	0	17
Rainbow Warriors	0	3	7	10	20

at Clarence T. C. Ching Athletics Complex, Honolulu, HI

- Date: September 23, 2023
- Game time: 6:00 p.m.
- Game weather: Sunny, 79 °F (26 °C)
- Game attendance: 10,254
- Referee: Michael Cuttone
- TV announcers (SPEC PPV): Kanoa Leahey, Rich Miano, and Jordan Helle

Game information

First quarter

- NMSU – Monte Watkins 39-yard pass from Diego Pavia (Ethan Albertson kick), 7:17. Aggies 7–0. Drive: 6 plays, 68 yards, 3:33.

Second quarter

- NMSU – Ethan Albertson 35-yard field goal, 12:06. Aggies 10–0. Drive: 14 plays, 52 yards, 8:15.
- HAW – Matthew Shipley 35-yard field goal, 5:27. Aggies 10–3. Drive: 5 plays, 22 yards, 2:12.
- NMSU – Star Thomas 21-yard pass from Diego Pavia (Ethan Albertson kick), 1:38. Aggies 17–3. Drive: 8 plays, 73 yards, 3:39.

Third quarter

- HAW – Brayden Schager 4-yard run (Matthew Shipley kick), 10:22. Aggies 17–10. Drive: 8 plays, 75 yards, 4:38.

Fourth quarter

- HAW – Koali Nishigaya 3-yard pass from Brayden Schager (Matthew Shipley kick), 7:19. Tied 17–17. Drive: 11 plays, 43 yards, 6:36.
- HAW – Matthew Shipley 24-yard field goal, 0:00. Rainbow Warriors 20–17. Drive: 11 plays, 65 yards, 3:00.

Top passers

- NMSU – Diego Pavia – 9/15, 155 yards, 2 TD
- HAW – Brayden Schager – 26/37, 245 yards, TD

Top rushers

- NMSU – Diego Pavia – 12 carries, 97 yards
- HAW – Jordan Johnson – 9 carries, 44 yards

Top receivers

- NMSU – Jordin Parker – 1 reception, 42 yards
- HAW – Pofele Ashlock – 7 receptions, 77 yards

=== at UNLV ===
Hawaii Rainbow Warriors at UNLV Rebels

Quarter	1	2	3	4	Total
Rainbow Warriors	0	3	10	7	20
Rebels	7	13	7	17	44

at Allegiant Stadium, Paradise, NV

- Date: September 30, 2023
- Game time: 10:00 a.m.
- Game weather: None (Indoor stadium)
- Game attendance: 25,328
- Referee: Jonathan Noli
- TV announcers (SPEC PPV): Steve Cofield, Matt Neverett

Game information

First quarter

- (9:04) UNLV – Vincent Davis 16-yard pass from Jayden Maiava, Jose Pizano kick (Drive: 5 plays, 66 yards, 2:29; UNLV 7–0)

Second quarter

- (13:27) UNLV – Jose Pizano 52-yard field goal (Drive: 5 plays, 28 yards, 1:27; UNLV 10–0)
- (12:00) HAW – Matthew Shipley 33-yard field goal (Drive: 6 plays, 59 yards, 1:27; UNLV 10–3)
- (4:56) UNLV – Jose Pizano 27-yard field goal (Drive: 13 plays, 66 yards, 7:04; UNLV 13–3)
- (0:45) UNLV – Courtney Reese 4-yard run, Jose Pizano kick (Drive: 4 plays, 30 yards, 4:11; UNLV 20–3)

Third quarter

- (11:45) HAW – Steven McBride 51-yard pass from Brayden Schager, Matthew Shipley kick (Drive: 1 play, 51 yards, 0:08; UNLV 20–10)
- (8:17) UNLV – Courtney Reese 21-yard run, Jose Pizano kick (Drive: 8 plays, 75 yards, 3:28; UNLV 27–10)
- (5:07) HAW – Matthew Shipley 34-yard field goal (Drive: 6 plays, 64 yards, 3:04; UNLV 27–13)

Fourth quarter

- (14:29) UNLV – Jose Pizano 48-yard field goal (Drive: 11 plays, 45 yards, 5:38; UNLV 30–13)
- (12:47) HAW – Alex Perry 38-yard pass from Brayden Schager, Matthew Shipley kick (Drive: 4 plays, 80 yards, 1:35; UNLV 30–20)
- (8:18) UNLV – Jacob De Jesus 3-yard pass from Jayden Maiava, Jose Pizano kick (Drive: 10 plays, 80 yards, 4:25; UNLV 37–20)
- (5:37) UNLV – Donavyn Lester 22-yard run, Jose Pizano kick (Drive: 2 plays, 50 yards, 0:20; UNLV 44–20)

Top passers

- HAW – Brayden Schager – 22/35, 313 yards, 2 TD, INT
- UNLV – Jayden Maiava – 11/21, 142 yards, 2 TD

Top rushers

- HAW – Tylan Hines – 9 carries, 43 yards
- UNLV – Donavyn Lester – 12 carries, 98 yards, TD

Top receivers

- HAW – Steven McBride – 6 receptions, 180 yards, TD
- UNLV – Ricky White – 5 receptions, 56 yards

=== San Diego State ===
San Diego State Aztecs at Hawaii Rainbow Warriors

Quarter	1	2	3	4	Total
Aztecs	10	7	3	21	41
Rainbow Warriors	0	14	10	10	34

at Clarence T. C. Ching Athletics Complex, Honolulu, HI

- Date: October 14, 2023
- Game time: 5:00 p.m.
- Game weather: Sunny • Temperature: 83 °F (28 °C) • Wind: NE 2 miles per hour (3.2 km/h)
- Game attendance: 10,039
- Referee: Kenneth Ray
- TV announcers (CBSSN): Jordan Kent (play-by-play) and Randy Cross (analyst)

Game information

First Quarter

- (12:12) SDSU - Jack Browning 22 yard field goal; 4 plays, 8 yards, 1:58 (San Diego State 3-0)
- (4:16) SDSU - Lucky Sutton 1 yard run (Jack Browning kick); 6 plays, 43 yards, 3:16 (San Diego State 10-0)

Second Quarter

- (12:25) SDSU - Deshawn McCuin 70 yard interception return (Jack Browning kick); 4 plays, 14 yards, 1:13 (San Diego State 17-0)
- (7:49) HAW - Pofele Ashlock 17 yard pass from Brayden Schager (Matthew Shipley kick); 10 plays, 91 yards, 4:30 (San Diego State 17-7)
- (1:30) HAW - Alex Perry 8 yard pass from Brayden Schager (Matthew Shipley kick); 3 plays, 67 yards, 1:29 (San Diego State 17-14)

Third Quarter

- (8:34) HAW - Matthew Shipley 46 yard field goal; 10 plays, 64 yards, 4:47 (Tied 17-17)
- (0:56) SDSU - Jack Browning 24 yard field goal; 13 plays, 68 yards, 7:38 (San Diego State 20-17)
- (0:00) HAW - Nick Cenacle 52 yard pass from Brayden Schager (Matthew Shipley kick); 3 plays, 75 yards, 0:56 (Hawaii 24-20)

Fourth Quarter

- (13:33) SDSU - Mekhi Shaw 69 yard pass from Jalen Mayden (Jack Browning kick); 3 plays, 76 yards, 1:18 (San Diego State 27-24)
- (12:27) SDSU - Lucky Sutton 2 yard run (Jack Browning kick); 3 plays, 24 yards, 0:49 (San Diego State 34-24)
- (10:22) HAW - Landon Sims 1 yard run (Matthew Shipley kick); 3 plays, 75 yards, 2:05 (San Diego State 34-31)
- (2:11) SDSU - Jaylon Armstead 1 yard run (Jack Browning kick); 5 plays, 23 yards, 2:56 (San Diego State 41-31)
- (0:59) HAW - Matthew Shipley 47 yard field goal; 6 plays, 45 yards, 1:12 (San Diego State 41-34)

Top passers

- SDSU – Jalen Mayden – 18/24, 221 yards, TD, INT
- HAW – Brayden Schager – 29/47, 427 yards, 3 TD, INT

Top rushers

- SDSU – Jalen Mayden – 13 carries, 53 yards
- HAW – Nasjzae Bryant-Lelei – 4 carries, 24 yards

Top receivers

- SDSU – Mekhi Shaw – 7 receptions, 126 yards, TD
- HAW – Steven McBride – 5 receptions, 157 yards

=== at New Mexico ===
New Mexico Lobos at Hawaii Rainbow Warriors

Quarter	1	2	3	4	Total
Rainbow Warriors	7	7	0	7	21
Lobos	14	14	7	7	42

at University Stadium, Albuquerque, NM

- Date: October 21, 2023
- Game time: 12:00 p.m.
- Game attendance: 13,723
- TV: SPEC PPV

=== San Jose State ===
San Jose State Spartans at Hawaii Rainbow Warriors

Quarter	1	2	3	4	Total
Spartans	7	14	7	7	35
Rainbow Warriors	0	0	0	0	0

at Clarence T. C. Ching Athletics Complex, Honolulu, HI

- Date: October 28, 2023
- Game time: 6:00 p.m.
- Game attendance: 11,486
- TV: SPEC PPV

=== at Nevada ===
Hawaii Rainbow Warriors at Nevada Wolf Pack

Quarter	1	2	3	4	Total
Rainbow Warriors	0	17	7	3	27
Wolf Pack	0	0	14	0	14

at Mackay Stadium, Reno, NV

- Date: November 4, 2023
- Game time: 10:00 a.m.
- Game attendance: 15,540
- TV: SPEC PPV

=== Air Force ===
Air Force Falcons at Hawaii Rainbow Warriors

Quarter	1	2	3	4	Total
Falcons	0	3	7	3	13
Rainbow Warriors	7	6	7	7	27

at Clarence T. C. Ching Athletics Complex, Honolulu, HI

- Date: November 11, 2023
- Game time: 6:00 p.m.
- Game attendance: 12,742
- TV: SPEC PPV

=== at Wyoming ===
Hawaii Rainbow Warriors at Wyoming Cowboys

Quarter	1	2	3	4	Total
Rainbow Warriors	0	0	9	0	9
Cowboys	14	21	0	7	42

at War Memorial Stadium, Laramie, WY

- Date: November 18, 2023
- Game time: 9:00 a.m.
- Game weather: Sunny, 52 °F (11 °C)
- Game attendance: 18,233
- Referee: Michael Cuttone
- TV announcers (SPEC PPV): Jordan Helle, Rich Miano

Game information

First quarter

- WYO – Ryan Marquez 44-yard pass from Andrew Peasley (John Hoyland kick), 14:00. Cowboys 7–0. Drive: 3 plays, 75 yards, 1:00.
- WYO – John Michael Gyllenborg 89-yard pass from Andrew Peasley (John Hoyland kick), 10:58. Cowboys 14–0. Drive: 1 play, 89 yards, 0:13.

Second quarter

- WYO – Harrison Waylee 28-yard run (John Hoyland kick), 9:57. Cowboys 21–0. Drive: 6 plays, 69 yards, 2:42.
- WYO – Wyatt Wieland 40-yard pass from Andrew Peasley (John Hoyland kick), 5:56. Cowboys 28–0. Drive: 4 plays, 66 yards, 2:04.
- WYO – Ayir Asante 6-yard run (John Hoyland kick), 2:35. Cowboys 35–0. Drive: 3 plays, 39 yards, 1:10.

Third quarter

- HAW – Matthew Shipley 30-yard field goal, 8:37. Cowboys 35–3. Drive: 7 plays, 12 yards, 4:03.
- HAW – Chuuky Hines 19-yard pass from Brayden Schager (Brayden Schager pass incomplete), 0:59. Cowboys 35–9. Drive: 13 plays, 71 yards, 6:16.

Fourth quarter

- WYO – Evan Svoboda 18-yard run (John Hoyland kick), 4:51. Cowboys 42–9. Drive: 4 plays, 27 yards, 1:58.

Top passers

- WYO – Andrew Peasley – 14/17, 319 yards, 3 TD
- HAW – Brayden Schager – 25/44, 278 yards, TD, 2 INT

Top rushers

- WYO – Harrison Waylee – 11 rushes, 70 yards, TD
- HAW – David Cordero – 13 rushes, 32 yards

Top receivers

- WYO – John Michael Gyllenborg – 3 receptions, 128 yards, TD
- HAW – Steven McBride – 5 receptions, 103 yards

=== Colorado State ===
Colorado State Rams at Hawaii Rainbow Warriors

Quarter	1	2	3	4	Total
Rams	7	3	0	14	24
Rainbow Warriors	7	7	7	6	27

at Clarence T. C. Ching Athletics Complex, Honolulu, HI

- Date: November 25, 2023
- Game time: 6:00 p.m.
- Game weather: Temperature: 77 °F (25 °C) • Wind: E at 11 miles per hour (18 km/h) • Weather: Sunny
- Game attendance: 11,013
- Referee: Christian Watson
- TV: SPEC PPV

Game information

First quarter

Second quarter

Third quarter

Fourth quarter

Top passers

- CSU – Brayden Fowler-Nicolosi – 26/38, 317 yards, 2 TD, INT
- HAW – Brayden Schager – 30/43, 320 yards, TD

Top rushers

- CSU – Justin Marshall – 20 carries, 94 yards, TD
- HAW – David Cordero – 5 carries, 52 yards

Top receivers

- CSU – Tory Horton – 9 receptions, 186 yards, TD
- HAW – Steven McBride – 6 receptions, 82 yards, TD
