= 2023 New Mexico Lobos football team =

American college football season

2023 New Mexico Lobos football
- Conference: Mountain West Conference
- Record: 4–8 (2–6 MW)
- Head coach: Danny Gonzales (4th season)
- Offensive coordinator: Bryant Vincent (1st season)
- Offensive scheme: Spread option
- Defensive coordinator: Troy Reffett (2nd season)
- Base defense: 3–3–5
- Home stadium: University Stadium

2023 Mountain West Conference football standings
	Conf.			Overall
Team	W		L	W		L
UNLV y	6	–	2	9	–	5
Boise State y$	6	–	2	8	–	6
San Jose State	6	–	2	7	–	6
Air Force	5	–	3	9	–	4
Wyoming	5	–	3	9	–	4
Fresno State	4	–	4	9	–	4
Utah State	4	–	4	6	–	7
Hawaii	3	–	5	5	–	8
Colorado State	3	–	5	5	–	7
Nevada	2	–	6	2	–	10
New Mexico	2	–	6	4	–	8
San Diego State	2	–	6	4	–	8
Championship: Boise State 44, UNLV 20
$ – Conference champion; y – Championship game participant

The 2023 New Mexico Lobos football team represented the University of New Mexico as a member of the Mountain West Conference (MW) during the 2023 NCAA Division I FBS football season. Led by Danny Gonzales in his fourth and final season, the Lobos compiled an overall record of 4–8 with a mark of 2–6 in conference play, placing in a three-way tie for tenth at the bottom of MW standings. The team played home games at University Stadium in Albuquerque, New Mexico.

Gonzales was fired following the conclusion of the season. He finished his tenure at New Mexico with a record of 11–32.

== Schedule ==
Date	Time	Opponent	Site	TV	Result	Attendance
September 2	5:00 p.m.	at No. 23 Texas A&M*	Kyle Field; College Station, TX	ESPN	L 10–52	97,560
September 9	6:00 p.m.	Tennessee Tech*	University Stadium; Albuquerque, NM	MW Network	W 56–10	17,279
September 16	6:00 p.m.	New Mexico State*	University Stadium; Albuquerque, NM (Rio Grande Rivalry)	MW Network	L 17–27	27,414
September 23	1:30 p.m.	at UMass*	Warren McGuirk Alumni Stadium; Amherst, MA	ESPN+	W 34–31	8,298
September 30	2:00 p.m.	at Wyoming	War Memorial Stadium; Laramie, WY	MW Network	L 26–35	25,477
October 14	4:00 p.m.	San Jose State	University Stadium; Albuquerque, NM	MW Network	L 24–52	13,027
October 21	4:00 p.m.	Hawaii^{†}	University Stadium; Albuquerque, NM	SPEC PPV	W 42–21	13,723
October 28	8:30 p.m.	at Nevada	Mackay Stadium; Reno, NV	CBSSN	L 24–34	13,083
November 4	4:00 p.m.	UNLV	University Stadium; Albuquerque, NM	MW Network	L 14–56	12,353
November 11	8:00 p.m.	at Boise State	Albertsons Stadium; Boise, ID	FS1	L 14–42	34,076
November 18	8:30 p.m.	at Fresno State	Valley Children's Stadium; Fresno, CA	FS1	W 25–17	38,569
November 24	1:30 p.m.	Utah State	University Stadium; Albuquerque, NM	CBSSN	L 41–44 ^{2OT}	12,094
*Non-conference game; ^{†}Homecoming; Rankings from AP Poll released prior to the game; All times are in Mountain time

== Game summaries ==
=== at No. 23 Texas A&M ===
Game One: New Mexico Lobos (0-0) at No. 23 Texas A&M Aggies (0-0) – Game summary

Quarter	1	2	3	4	Total
New Mexico	0	7	3	0	10
No. 23 Texas A&M	7	28	7	10	52

at Kyle Field, College Station, Texas

- Date: Saturday, September 2, 2023
- Game time: 6:00 p.m. CDT
- Game weather: Sunny, 99 °F (37 °C)
- Game attendance: 97,560
- Referee: David Smith
- TV announcers (ESPN): Mark Jones (play-by-play), Louis Riddick (analyst), and Quint Kessenich (sideline)
- Box score, Recap

Game information
First quarter
- (5:00) TXAM – Noah Thomas 15-yard pass from Connor Weigman (Randy Bond kick) (Drive: 7 plays, 85 yards, 3:10; Texas A&M 7-0)

Second quarter

- (14:53) TXAM – Evan Stewart 35-yard pass from Connor Weigman (Randy Bond kick) (Drive: 5 plays, 45 yards, 1:37; Texas A&M 14-0)
- (10:32) UNM – Jacory Croskey-Merritt 27-yard run (Luke Drzewiecki kick) (Drive: 6 plays, 88 yards, 4:21; Texas A&M 14-7)
- (8:03) TXAM – Noah Thomas 34-yard pass from Connor Weigman (Randy Bond kick) (Drive: 6 plays, 67 yards, 2:29; Texas A&M 21-7)
- (5:30) TXAM – Le'Veon Moss 2-yard run (Randy Bond kick) (Drive: 5 plays, 38 yards, 2:02; Texas A&M 28-7)
- (1:27) TXAM – Noah Thomas 9-yard pass from Connor Weigman (Randy Bond kick) (Drive: 5 plays, 37 yards, 2:00; Texas A&M 35-7)

Third quarter

- (6:09) UNM – Luke Drzeweicki 27-yard field goal (Drive: 12 plays, 51 yards, 7:09; Texas A&M 35-10)
- (2:30) TXAM – Evan Stewart 8-yard pass from Connor Weigman (Randy Bond kick) (Drive: 9 plays, 70 yards, 3:39; Texas A&M 42-10)

Fourth quarter

- (7:35) TXAM – Moose Muhammad III 12-yard pass from Max Johnson (Randy Bond kick) (Drive: 6 plays, 55 yards, 3:37; Texas A&M 49-10)
- (1:10) TXAM – Randy Bond 39-yard field goal (Drive: 9 plays, 40 yards, 3:32; Texas A&M 52-10)

Statistics	UNM	TXAM
First downs	18	27
Total yards	60–222	63–411
Rushing yards	32–91	29–134
Passing yards	131	277
Passing: Comp–Att–Int	16–28–1	24–34–0
Time of possession	34:20	25:40

Team	Category	Player	Statistics
New Mexico	Passing	Dylan Hopkins	15/24, 115 yards, INT
New Mexico	Rushing	Jacory Croskey-Merritt	11 carries, 50 yards, TD
New Mexico	Receiving	Jeremiah Hixon	6 receptions, 42 yards
Texas A&M	Passing	Conner Weigman	18/23, 236 yards, 5 TD
Texas A&M	Rushing	Amari Daniels	7 carries, 51 yards
Texas A&M	Receiving	Evan Stewart	8 receptions, 115 yards, 2 TD

=== New Mexico State ===
Game Three – New Mexico State Aggies (1–2) at New Mexico Lobos (1–1)

Quarter	1	2	3	4	Total
Aggies	0	17	3	7	27
Lobos	3	7	0	7	17

at University Stadium, Albuquerque, New Mexico

- Date: September 16
- Game time: 6:00 p.m. MDT
- Game weather: Clear, 80 °F (27 °C)
- Game attendance: 27,414
- Referee: Jonathan Noli
- TV announcers (MW Network): Jeff Siembieda and George Carter
- Box score, Recap

Game information
First quarter
- UNM – Luke Drzewiecki 25-yard field goal, 8:25. Lobos 3–0. Drive: 12 plays, 78 yards, 6:29.

Second quarter

- NMSU – Star Thomas 2-yard run (Ethan Albertson kick), 13:32. Aggies 7–3. Drive: 10 plays, 88 yards, 5:18.
- UNM – Jacory Croskey-Merritt 1-yard run (Luke Drzewiecki kick), 9:01. Lobos 10–7. Drive: 7 plays, 75 yards, 4:31.
- NMSU – Ethan Albertson 26-yard field goal, 4:31. Tied 10–10. Drive: 8 plays, 66 yards, 4:30.
- NMSU – Jonathan Brady 31-yard pass from Diego Pavia (Ethan Albertson kick), 0:41. Aggies 17–10. Drive: 6 plays, 63 yards, 2:08.

Third quarter

- NMSU – Ethan Albertson 47-yard field goal, 1:17. Aggies 20–10. Drive: 12 plays, 61 yards, 8:08.

Fourth quarter

- UNM – Andrew Erickson 1-yard pass from Dylan Hopkins (Luke Drzewiecki kick), 10:16. Aggies 20–17. Drive: 11 plays, 75 yards, 6:01.
- NMSU – Jonathan Brady 75-yard pass from Diego Pavia (Ethan Albertson kick), 10:06. Aggies 27–17. Drive: 1 play, 75 yards, 0:10.

Statistics	NMSU	UNM
First downs	15	26
Total yards	397	401
Rushing yards	177	154
Passing yards	220	247
Turnovers	0	1
Time of possession	27:53	32:07

Team	Category	Player	Statistics
New Mexico State	Passing	Diego Pavia	9/14, 203 yards, 2 TD
New Mexico State	Rushing	Diego Pavia	11 rushes, 96 yards
New Mexico State	Receiving	Jonathan Brady	3 receptions, 109 yards, 2 TD
New Mexico	Passing	Dylan Hopkins	20/39, 247 yards, TD
New Mexico	Rushing	Jacory Croskey-Merritt	16 rushes, 83 yards, TD
New Mexico	Receiving	Jeremiah Hixon	5 receptions, 45 yards

=== at Wyoming ===
Game Five – New Mexico Lobos (2–2) at Wyoming Cowboys (3–1)

Quarter	1	2	3	4	Total
Lobos	6	3	3	14	26
Cowboys	9	3	17	6	35

at War Memorial Stadium, Laramie, Wyoming

- Date: September 30
- Game time: 2:02 p.m. MDT
- Game weather: Sunny, 75 °F (24 °C)
- Game attendance: 25,477
- Referee: Kenneth Ray
- TV announcers (Mountain West Network): Chris Sylvester, Jared Petrino, and Bridget Howard
- Box score, Recap

Game information

First quarter

- UNM – Jeremiah Hixon 17-yard pass from Dylan Hopkins (Luke Drzewiecki kick blocked), 10:50. Lobos 6–0. Drive: 8 plays, 75 yards, 4:10.
- WYO – Jakorey Hawkins 81-yard PAT return, 10:50. Lobos 6–2.
- WYO – Andrew Peasley 2-yard run (John Hoyland kick), 2:58. Cowboys 9–6. Drive: 6 plays, 58 yards, 3:20.

Second quarter

- UNM – Luke Drzewiecki 39-yard field goal, 11:50. Tied 9–9. Drive: 12 plays, 53 yards, 6:08.
- WYO – John Hoyland 38-yard field goal, 6:38. Cowboys 12–9. Drive: 10 plays, 55 yards, 5:12.

Third quarter

- WYO – John Hoyland 34-yard field goal, 10:15. Cowboys 15–9. Drive: 10 plays, 58 yards, 4:45.
- WYO – Harrison Waylee 46-yard run (John Hoyland kick), 7:56. Cowboys 22–9. Drive: 1 play, 46 yards, 0:11.
- UNM – Luke Drzewiecki 26-yard field goal, 5:15. Cowboys 22–12. Drive: 10 plays, 67 yards, 2:41.
- WYO – Ayir Asante 66-yard pass from Andrew Peasley (John Hoyland kick), 0:00. Cowboys 29–12. Drive: 1 play, 66 yards, 0:08.

Fourth quarter

- UNM – Jeremiah Hixon 14-yard pass from Devon Dampier (Luke Drzewiecki kick), 13:06. Cowboys 29–19. Drive: 4 plays, 71 yards, 1:49.
- WYO – John Hoyland 26-yard field goal, 10:57. Cowboys 32–19. Drive: 5 plays, 66 yards, 2:09.
- UNM – DJ Washington 11-yard pass from Devon Dampier (Luke Drzewiecki kick), 1:12. Cowboys 32–26. Drive: 11 plays, 99 yards, 4:42.
- WYO – John Hoyland 38-yard field goal, 0:06. Cowboys 35–26. Drive: 4 plays, 7 yards, 1:06.

Top passers

- UNM – Dylan Hopkins – 15/31, 162 yards, TD, INT
- WYO – Andrew Peasley – 16/25, 194 yards, TD

Top rushers

- UNM – Jacory Croskey-Merritt – 14 rushes, 92 yards
- WYO – Harrison Waylee – 18 rushes, 191 yards, 1 TD

Top receivers

- UNM – Ryan Davis – 4 receptions, 59 yards
- WYO – Ayir Asante – 2 receptions, 72 yards, 1 TD

=== San Jose State ===
Game Six – San Jose State Spartans (1–5) at New Mexico (2–3)

Quarter	1	2	3	4	Total
Spartans	0	14	24	14	52
Lobos	3	14	0	7	24

at University Stadium, Albuquerque, NM

- Date: October 14, 2023
- Game time: 3:00 p.m. PST
- TV: MW Network

Game information

First Quarter
Second Quarter
Third Quarter
Fourth Quarter

Win Probability

Line

Over/Under

Statistics	SJSU	UNM
First downs		
Total yards		
Rushing yards		
Passing yards		
Turnovers		
Time of possession		

Team	Category	Player	Statistics
SJSU	Passing		
SJSU	Rushing		
SJSU	Receiving		
New Mexico	Passing		
New Mexico	Rushing		
New Mexico	Receiving		

=== Hawaii ===
Game Seven – New Mexico Lobos (2–4) at Hawaii Rainbow Warriors (2–5)

Quarter	1	2	3	4	Total
Rainbow Warriors	7	7	0	7	21
Lobos	14	14	7	7	42

at University Stadium, Albuquerque, NM

- Date: October 21, 2023
- Game time: 12:00 p.m.
- Game attendance: 13,723
- TV: SPEC PPV

=== at UNLV ===
Game Nine – UNLV Rebels (6–2) at New Mexico Lobos (3–5) – Game summary

Quarter	1	2	3	4	Total
Rebels	14	21	14	7	56
Lobos	0	7	0	7	14

at University Stadium • Albuquerque, NM

- Date: November 4, 2023
- Game time: 4:00 p.m. MST
- Game weather: Clear, 74 °F (23 °C)
- Game attendance: 12,353
- Referee: Michael Cuttone
- TV announcers (KVVU): Steve Cofield, Matt Neverett

Game information

First quarter

- (12:15) UNLV – Ricky White 30-yard pass from Jayden Maiava, Jose Pizano kick (Drive: 1 play, 30 yards, 0:07; UNLV 7–0)
- (5:44) UNLV – Vincent Davis 5-yard run, Jose Pizano kick (Drive: 5 plays, 32 yards, 1:53; UNLV 14–0)

Second quarter

- (14:15) UNM – Andrew Henry 3-yard run, Luke Drzewiecki kick (Drive: 12 plays, 75 yards, 6:29; UNLV 14–7)
- (9:00) UNLV – Vincent Davis 5-yard run, Jose Pizano kick (Drive: 10 plays, 75 yards, 5:15; UNLV 21–7)
- (6:56) UNLV – Donavyn Lester 5-yard run, Jose Pizano kick (Drive: 1 play, 5 yards, 0:06; UNLV 28–7)
- (4:22) UNLV – Courtney Reese 2-yard run, Jose Pizano kick (Drive: 3 plays, 21 yards, 1:20; UNLV 35–7)

Third quarter

- (11:41) UNLV – Dominic Gicinto 43-yard pass from Jayden Maiava, Jose Pizano kick (Drive: 9 plays, 75 yards, 5:15; UNLV 42–7)
- (9:17) UNLV – Ricky White 58-yard pass from Jayden Maiava, Jose Pizano kick (Drive: 1 play, 58 yards, 0:08; UNLV 49–7)

Fourth quarter

- (10:31) UNLV – Cameron Friel 1-yard run, Andre Meono kick (Drive: 4 plays, 9 yards, 2:01; UNLV 56–7)
- (3:05) UNM – Jacory Croskey-Merritt 1-yard pass from Devon Dampier, Luke Drzewiecki kick (Drive: 14 plays, 75 yards, 7:26; UNLV 56–14)

Statistics	UNLV	UNM
First downs	17	20
Total yards	416	362
Rushing yards	32–169	45–166
Passing yards	247	196
Passing: Comp–Att–Int	13–18–0	17–26–0
Time of possession	22:42	37:18

Team	Category	Player	Statistics
UNLV	Passing	Jayden Maiava	13/18, 247 yards, 3 TD
UNLV	Rushing	Vincent Davis	9 carries, 64 yards, 2 TD
UNLV	Receiving	Ricky White	8 receptions, 165 yards, 2 TD
New Mexico	Passing	Dylan Hopkins	15/23, 187 yards
New Mexico	Rushing	Jacory Croskey-Merritt	21 carries, 86 yards
New Mexico	Receiving	DJ Washington	5 receptions, 78 yards

=== at Fresno State ===
Game Eleven – New Mexico Lobos (3–7) at Fresno State Bulldogs (8–2)

Quarter	1	2	3	4	Total
Lobos	3	9	6	7	25
Bulldogs	7	7	0	3	17

at Valley Children's Stadium • Fresno, California

- Date: Saturday, November 18, 2023
- Game time: 7:30 p.m. PDT
- Game weather: Rain • Temperature: 57 °F (14 °C) • Wind: N 3mph
- Game attendance: 38,569
- Referee: Patrick Foy
- TV announcers (FS1): Jordan Kent (play-by-play) & Will Blackmon (analyst)

Game information

First quarter

- (9:53) UNM – Luke Drzewiecki 38-yard field goal (Drive: 8 plays, 45 yards, 5:07; New Mexico 3–0)
- (6:05) FRES – Logan Fife 1-yard run, Dylan Lynch kick (Drive: 8 plays, 77 yards, 3:42; Fresno State 7–3)

Second quarter

- (11:06) FRES – Malik Sherrod 6-yard run, Dylan Lynch kick (Drive: 7 plays, 78 yards, 3:07; Fresno State 14–3)
- (6:08) UNM – Luke Drzewiecki 38-yard field goal (Drive: 11 plays, 54 yards, 4:58; Fresno State 14–6)
- (2:19) UNM – Jacory Croskey-Merritt 50-yard run, two-point pass failed (Drive: 4 plays, 92 yards, 2:08; Fresno State 14–12)

Third quarter

- (2:30) UNM – Jacory Croskey-Merritt 10-yard run, two-point pass failed (Drive: 10 plays, 93 yards, 5:25; New Mexico 18–14)

Fourth quarter

- (8:57) UNM – Caleb Medford 33-yard pass from Devon Dampier, Luke Drzewiecki kick (Drive: 10 plays, 97 yards, 5:53; New Mexico 25–14)
- (3:25) FRES – Dylan Lynch 44-yard field goal (Drive: 15 plays, 63 yards, 1:57; New Mexico 25–17)

Statistics	UNM	FRES
First downs	26	13
Plays–yards	72–528	49–235
Rushes–yards	51–345	19–34
Passing yards	183	195
Passing: comp–att–int	10–21–2	18–32–0
Turnovers		
Time of possession	39:05	20:55

Team	Category	Player	Statistics
New Mexico	Passing	Dylan Hopkins	8/18, 124 yards, 2 INT
New Mexico	Rushing	Jacory Croskey-Merritt	21 carries, 209 yards, 2 TD
New Mexico	Receiving	Caleb Medford	6 receptions, 122 yards, TD
Fresno State	Passing	Logan Fife	9/15, 137 yards
Fresno State	Rushing	Malik Sherrod	13 carries, 50 yards, TD
Fresno State	Receiving	Jalen Moss	1 reception, 53 yards

== Personnel ==
=== Transfers ===
==== Outgoing ====
Player	Position	Destination
C. J. Montes	QB	Fordham
Benji Johnson	S	Austin Peay
Jaden Phillips	DL	Sam Houston State
Adari Haulcy	S	Houston
AJ Odums	CB	UTEP
Keyonta Lanier	WR	Colorado State
Peyton Dixon	RB	Nevada
Jah'mar Sanders	WR	Lamar
Andrell Barney Jr.	CB	Snow College
Antonio Hunt	CB	Unknown
Ian Shewell	DL	Arizona State
Jaden Hullaby	RB	Unknown
Ronald Wilson	S	Incarnate Word
Jake Saltonstall	DL	Unknown
Geordon Porter	CB	UConn
Xavier Hailey	S	Unknown
Cody Moon	LB	San Diego State
Zoe Roberts	WR	Unknown
Trae Hall	WR	Unknown
Chad Alexander	RB	Unknown
Dion Hunter	LB	Cincinnati
Zacchaeus Williams	IOL	Unknown
Alex Murrell	WR	Unknown
Donald Dixon	IOL	Unknown
Myron Carter	RB	Unknown

==== Incoming ====
Player	Position	Previous School
Xavier Van	WR	San Diego
Andrew Henry	RB	Louisiana–Monroe
Gabriel Lopez	EDGE	Washington State
Bryson Washington	S	Oklahoma
Jeremiah Hixon	WR	Alabama State
Caleb Medford	WR	TCU
DC Tabscott	QB	Appalachian State
Dylan Hopkins	QB	UAB
Marvin Covington	CB	TCU
D'Arco Perkins-McAllister	S	TCU
Sam Telesa	OC	Georgetown
Max Lantzsch	TE	East Carolina
Kaydin Pope	WR	Mississippi State
Travis Gray	OT	Colorado
Noa Pola-Gates	S	Nebraska
Taurrian Stafford	IOL	Alabama State
Jacory Croskey-Merritt	RB	Alabama State
