= Mark Redman (American football) =

American football player (born 2002)

No. 86 – Green Bay Packers
- Position: Tight end
- Roster status: Active

Personal information
- Born: January 20, 2002 (age 24); Newport Beach, California, U.S.
- Listed height: 6 ft 5 in (1.96 m)
- Listed weight: 258 lb (117 kg)

Career information
- High school: Corona del Mar (Newport Beach, California)
- College: Washington (2020–2021); San Diego State (2022–2023); Louisville (2024)
- NFL draft: 2025: undrafted

Career history
- Los Angeles Rams (2025–2026)*; Green Bay Packers (2026–present)
- * Offseason or practice squad member only

Awards and highlights
- 2× Second-team All-Mountain West (2022, 2023)

Career NFL statistics as of Week 10, 2026
- Receptions: 3
- Receiving yards: 34
- Stats at Pro Football Reference

Mark Redman (born January 20, 2002) is an American professional football tight end for the Green Bay Packers of the National Football League (NFL). He played college football for the Washington Huskies, San Diego State Aztecs, and Louisville Cardinals.

== College career ==
Redman played college football for the Washington Huskies from 2020 to 2021, San Diego State Aztecs from 2022 to 2023 and the Louisville Cardinals in 2024. He played in 16 games at Washington, only recording one catch for five yards against California. After the 2021 season, Redman entered the transfer portal, eventually committing to San Diego State.

In two seasons at San Diego State, Redman recorded 59 receptions for 641 yards and five touchdowns. He was named to the Second-team All-Mountain West team in both years. Following the 2023 season, Redman entered the transfer portal again for his final year of eligibility, committing to Louisville.

In his lone season at Louisville, Redman caught 24 passes for 256 yards and three touchdowns.

=== College statistics ===
Legend
**Bold**	Career high

Year	Team	Games		Receiving			
Year	Team	GP	GS	Rec	Yds	Avg	TD
2020	Washington	4	0	0	0	—	0
2021	Washington	12	1	1	5	5.0	0
2022	San Diego State	**13**	**12**	21	233	**11.1**	2
2023	San Diego State	12	**12**	**38**	**408**	10.7	**3**
2024	Louisville	**13**	**12**	24	256	10.7	**3**
Career		54	37	84	902	10.7	8

== Professional career ==
Pre-draft measurables
Height	Weight	Arm length	Hand span	Wingspan	40-yard dash	10-yard split	20-yard split	20-yard shuttle	Three-cone drill	Vertical jump	Broad jump	Bench press
6 ft 6 in (1.98 m)	263 lb (119 kg)	33 in (0.84 m)	9 5/8 in (0.24 m)	6 ft 9 1/4 in (2.06 m)	4.95 s	1.66 s	2.73 s	4.52 s	7.25 s	32 in (0.81 m)	9 ft 4 in (2.84 m)	21 reps
All values from Pro Day

=== Los Angeles Rams ===
After not being selected in the 2025 NFL draft, Redman signed with the Los Angeles Rams as an undrafted free agent. On July 24, 2025, he was placed on the Physically unable to perform (PUP) list. Redman was activated on August 3. He was released on August 26 as part of final roster cut downs, before re-signing to the team's practice squad the following day. On January 27, 2026, Redman signed a reserve/futures contract with Los Angeles.

=== Green Bay Packers ===
On August 30, 2026, Redman was traded to the Green Bay Packers in exchange for a 2028 seventh-round pick.
