= Brayden Schager =

American football player (born 2003)

No. 10 – Saskatchewan Roughriders
- Position: Quarterback
- Roster status: Reserve

Personal information
- Born: August 13, 2003 (age 23); Dallas, Texas, U.S.
- Listed height: 6 ft 3 in (1.91 m)
- Listed weight: 220 lb (100 kg)

Career information
- High school: Highland Park (University Park, Texas)
- College: Hawaii (2021–2024)
- NFL draft: 2025: undrafted

Career history
- Saskatchewan Roughriders (2025–present)

Brayden Schager (born August 13, 2003) is an American professional football quarterback for the Saskatchewan Roughriders of the Canadian Football League (CFL). He played college football for the Hawaii Rainbow Warriors.

== Early life ==
Schager was born in Dallas, Texas. His father, Scott Schager, was a wrestler at Iowa State. Brayden attended Highland Park High School.

== College career ==
Schager enrolled at the University of Hawaiʻi at Mānoa in 2021. As a freshman, he appeared in six games and was the team's starting quarterback in three of those games, going 2–1, with a key victory over #18 Fresno State. As a sophomore in the 2022, he became the team's regular starting quarterback, completing 221 of 400 passes for 2,348 yards and 13 touchdowns. He also threw for 306 yards in a 41–34 loss against the Utah State Aggies.

Schager entered the 2023 season as the team's clear starter at quarterback. To end the 2023 season, he had thrown for 3,542 yards, 26 touchdowns and 14 interceptions. His season high for passing was 427 yards in a loss to the San Diego State Aztecs, 41–34. He entered the transfer portal on December 6, 2023, but withdrew days later. It was also announced on December 24 that he would return to play at Hawaii for his senior season. In 2024, He threw for 2,591 yards and 19 touchdowns, but had problems with turnovers as he threw 13 interceptions. He ran for 4 touchdowns in a 34–13 win over the Nevada Wolf Pack.

=== Statistics ===
Year	Team	Games			Passing								Rushing			
Year	Team	GP	GS	Record	Comp	Att	Pct	Yards	Avg	TD	Int	Rate	Att	Yards	Avg	TD
2021	Hawaii	6	3	2−1	65	107	60.7	615	5.7	2	5	105.9	14	-50	-3.6	0
2022	Hawaii	12	10	2−8	221	400	55.3	2,348	5.9	13	10	110.3	45	47	1.0	0
2023	Hawaii	13	13	5−8	332	525	63.2	3,542	6.7	26	14	130.9	103	63	0.6	2
2024	Hawaii	11	11	4−7	233	403	57.8	2,591	6.4	19	13	120.9	136	259	2.0	6
Career		42	37	13–24	851	1,435	59.3	9,096	6.3	60	42	120.5	298	319	1.1	8

== Professional career ==
Pre-draft measurables
Height	Weight
6 ft 3 1/8 in (1.91 m)	220 lb (100 kg)
Values from Pro Day

On September 30, 2025, Schager was signed to the practice roster of the Saskatchewan Roughriders. He was released on October 29. Schager was re-signed by the Roughriders on November 19, after the 2025 season had concluded.
