= Jalen Mayden =

American football player (born 2000)

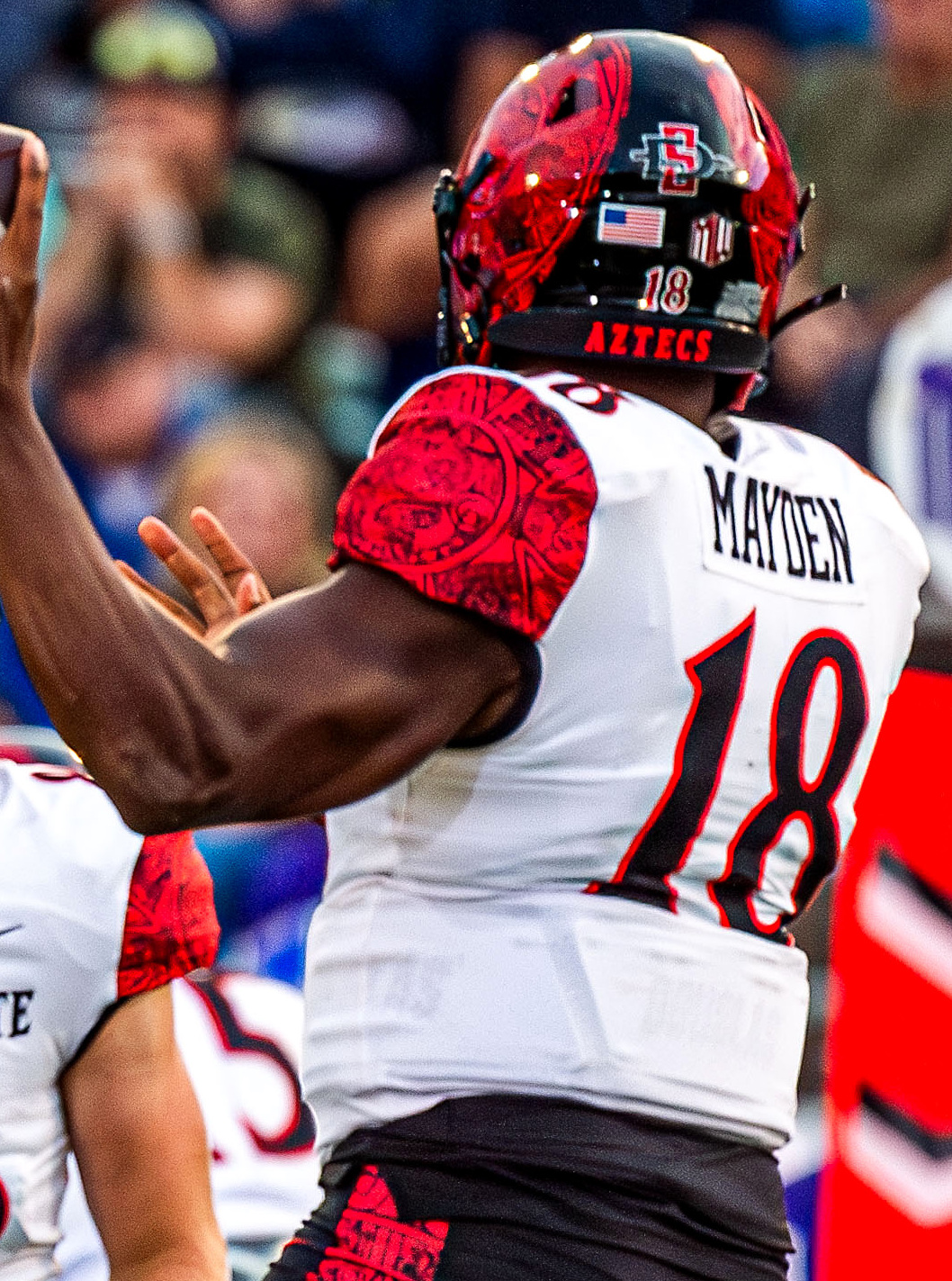
- Mayden with San Diego State in 2023

No. 18
- Position: Quarterback

Personal information
- Born: February 9, 2000 (age 26); Garland, Texas, U.S.
- Listed height: 6 ft 3 in (1.91 m)
- Listed weight: 220 lb (100 kg)

Career information
- High school: Sachse (Sachse, Texas)
- College: Mississippi State (2018–2020); San Diego State (2021–2023)
- Stats at ESPN

Jalen Ta'sean Mayden (born February 9, 2000) is an American college football quarterback. He played college football for the Mississippi State Bulldogs and the San Diego State Aztecs.

== Early life ==
Mayden grew up in Garland, Texas and attended Sachse High School. In his high school football career, Mayden completed 409 of his 620 pass attempts for 6,210 yards, 74 touchdowns and 12 interceptions. Mayden would also rush for 1,876 yards and 24 touchdowns, while also hauling in a reception for 14 yards. He was rated a four-star recruit and committed to play college football at Mississippi State over offers from Baylor, Georgia, Houston, Illinois, Illinois State, Kansas State, Louisiana–Monroe, Louisville, Minnesota, NC State, Nebraska, Ohio State, Oregon State, South Florida, Syracuse, Tennessee, UCF, Utah, Virginia and Washington State.

== College career ==
=== Mississippi State ===
During Mayden's true freshman season in 2018, he appeared in three games and was redshirted. He finished the season with completing one out of two passing attempts for nine yards and made seven rushing attempts for 32 yards. Mayden did not see any game action during the 2019 season.

On October 27, 2020, Mayden announced that he would be entering the transfer portal. On December 16, 2020, he announced that he would be transferring to San Diego State.

=== San Diego State ===
During the 2021 season, Mayden was named as SDSU's top incoming transfer and played in only one game as a quarterback but he appeared on the travel squad for the whole season. He finished the season with completing five out of six passing attempts for 50 yards and a touchdown during the 2021 Mountain West Conference Football Championship Game. He also made four rushing attempts for 36 yards. During the 2022 season, he played six games while on safety before moving back to the quarterback position where he played the final seven games while on that position. He finished the season with completing 141 out of 237 passing attempts for 2,030 yards, 12 touchdowns and 10 interceptions. He also made 69 rushing attempts for 231 yards and three touchdowns.

Prior to the 2023 season, Mayden was named to the Earl Campbell Tyler Rose Award Watch List and an Athlon Sports preseason third-team All-Mountain West selection.
