= Clarence T. C. Ching Athletics Complex =

Sports facility on the campus of the University of Hawai'i at Mānoa

Clarence Ching Athletics Complex

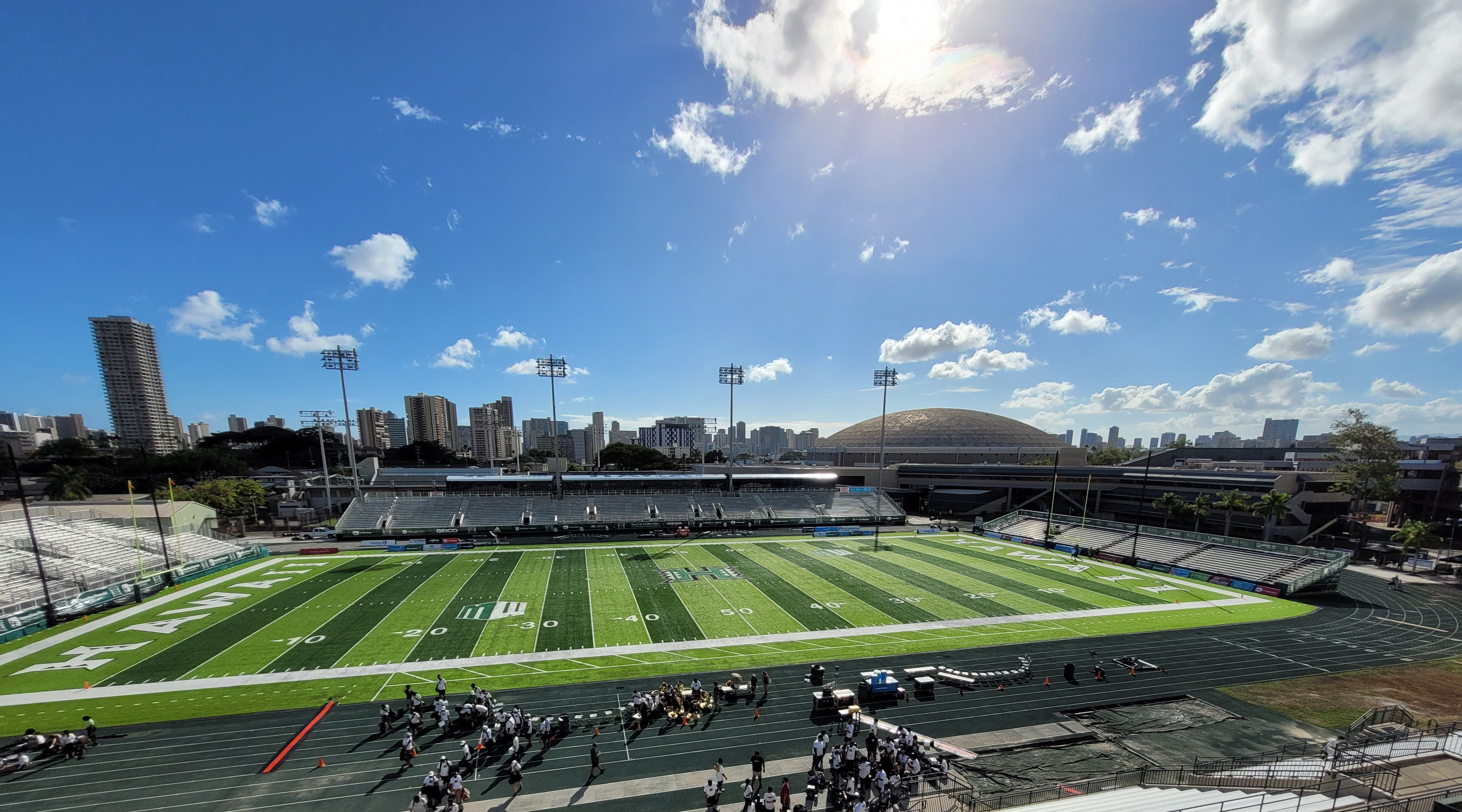
- View of the football stadium in 2021
- Interactive map of Clarence Ching Athletics Complex
- Full name: Clarence T. C. Ching Athletics Complex
- Address: 1105 Lower Campus Road
- Location: Honolulu, Hawaii, U.S.
- Coordinates: 21.294°N 157.818°W
- Owner: University of Hawaiʻi at Mānoa
- Operator: Univ. Hawaii Athletics
- Capacity: 15,194 (2023–present) Former capacity: List: 4,100 (2015–2020); 9,346 (2021–2022)
- Type: Sports complex
- Current use: Football; Beach volleyball; Track and field

Construction
- Opened: 2015; 11 years ago

Tenants
- Hawaii Rainbow (NCAA) teams: beach volleyball (2015–present); football (2021–present); women's soccer (2015–present); track and field (2015–present); Events: Hawaiʻi Bowl (NCAA) (2022–present)

Website
- hawaiiathletics.com/ching-complex

The Clarence T. C. Ching Athletics Complex is a sports complex located on the campus of the University of Hawaiʻi at Mānoa in Honolulu, which features a three-story building next to an all-purpose track and Clarence T. C. Ching Field. The facility, built in 2015, includes locker rooms and a meeting room for Hawaii beach volleyball, cross country, women's soccer and track and field teams.

It is the home venue to the university's football team since 2021. The stadium has seating capacity of 15,194, up from 9,346 in 2021 and 2022, though it has standing room for up to 16,000.

== History ==
The complex replaced the university's former sports facility, Cooke Field, following a $5 million donation from the foundation established by Hawaii real estate developer Clarence T. C. Ching (1912–1985). This was a record donation for the university's athletics program. This donation was intended to cover half the estimated $10 million cost of the development, due to open in 2013. However, project delays mean the complex ran 60% over budget and did not open until 2015. The remainder of the budget was covered by the university and the state of Hawaii.

The delay led to threats from the National Collegiate Athletic Association (NCAA) to decertify the institution's athletic department, given the lack of women's sports facilities. A key aspect of the new complex was to better serve women's athletics at Manoa, in particular the women's soccer team; however, as constructed, the facility's field was too narrow to accommodate women's soccer.

== Uses ==
The athletics complex served as the home field for the university's women's soccer team before they moved to soccer-specific stadium Waipiʻo Peninsula. It also has a 778-seat beach volleyball venue with two competition courts, used by the university's beach volleyball team.

The venue also serves as a cross country course. The field and its surrounding track function as the outdoor track and field facility for the university.

=== College football ===
The complex normally serves as the practice facility for the university's football team. In December 2020, issues with Aloha Stadium (home venue of the football team since 1975) led to that venue halting the scheduling of new events. As a result, the team announced plans to play home games on campus at the athletics complex "for at least the next three years". Prior to the 2021 season, the university prepared the complex for home football games, including increasing seating capacity, replacing the existing turf, installing a new scoreboard and speaker system and upgrading the press box.

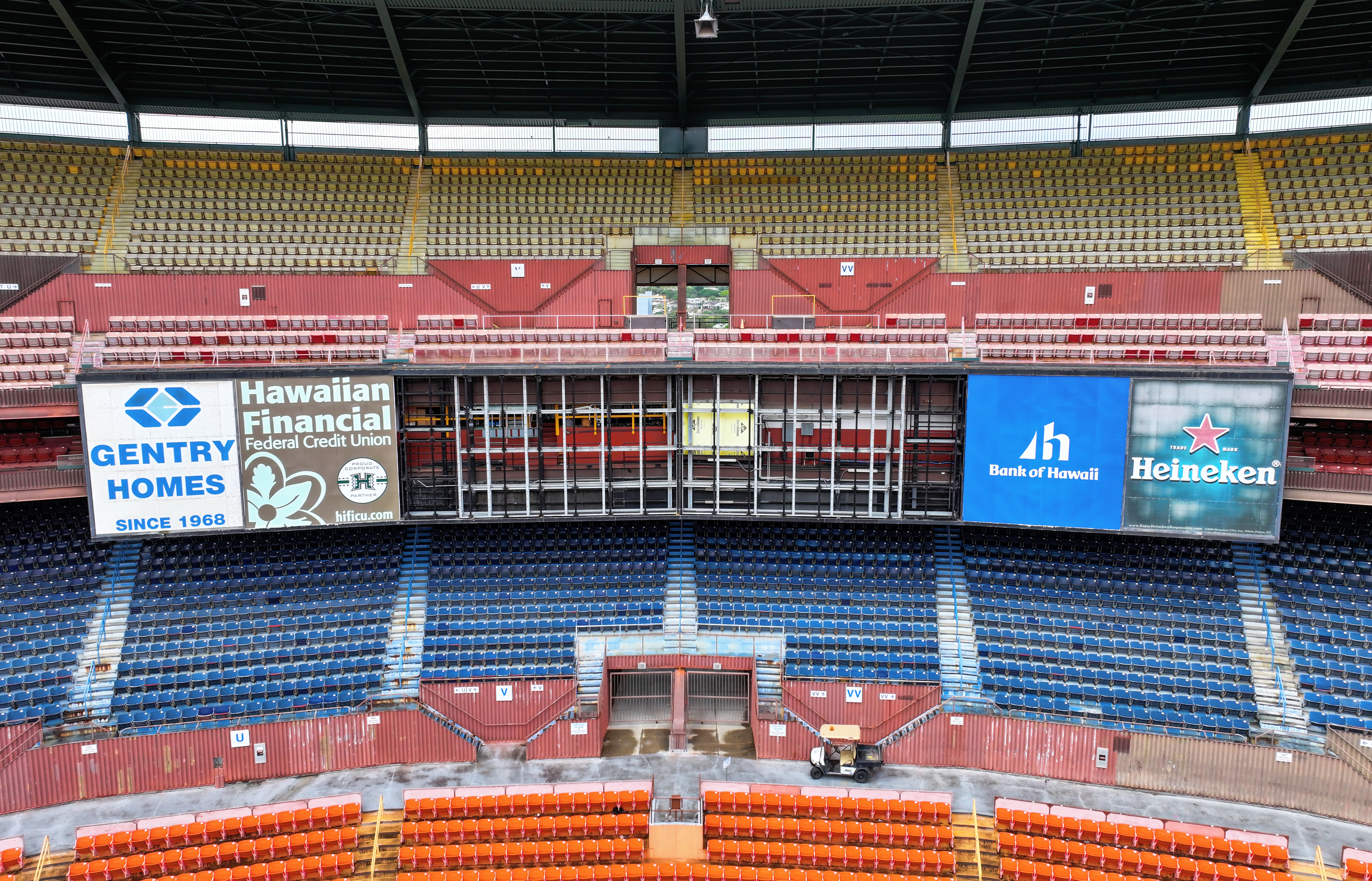
Aloha Stadium's former scoreboard is now installed at the Ching Athletics Complex.

The NCAA required Division 1 FBS football programs to "average at least 15,000 in actual or paid attendance for all home football contests over a two-year rolling period" to remain at the Football Bowl Subdivision (FBS) level. The initial expansion included 9,000 seats for the 2021 season, with plans to expand to 15,000 for the 2022 season, which met the FBS minimum. The expansion to 15,000 was delayed until 2023 due to effects stemming from the COVID-19 pandemic, which forced Hawaii football to play behind closed doors or with a limited capacity for the first half of their 2021 home schedule.

Matlin formally announced a plan to expand to 17,000 for the 2023 season. It was presented to the University of Hawaii Board of Regents on August 17, 2022, and was unanimously approved a day later. The expansion includes a newly-expanded mauka (northern) sideline stand with additional hospitality areas, additions to both end zone stands, filled corners, and the relocation of the old Aloha Stadium HD video board to the end zone stand adjacent to Les Murakami Stadium. Some of the new stands were built over top of the current track, necessitating the construction of a new facility for Hawai'i women's soccer and track, which will be built on the site of two practice fields near Murakami Stadium.

=== Year by year ===
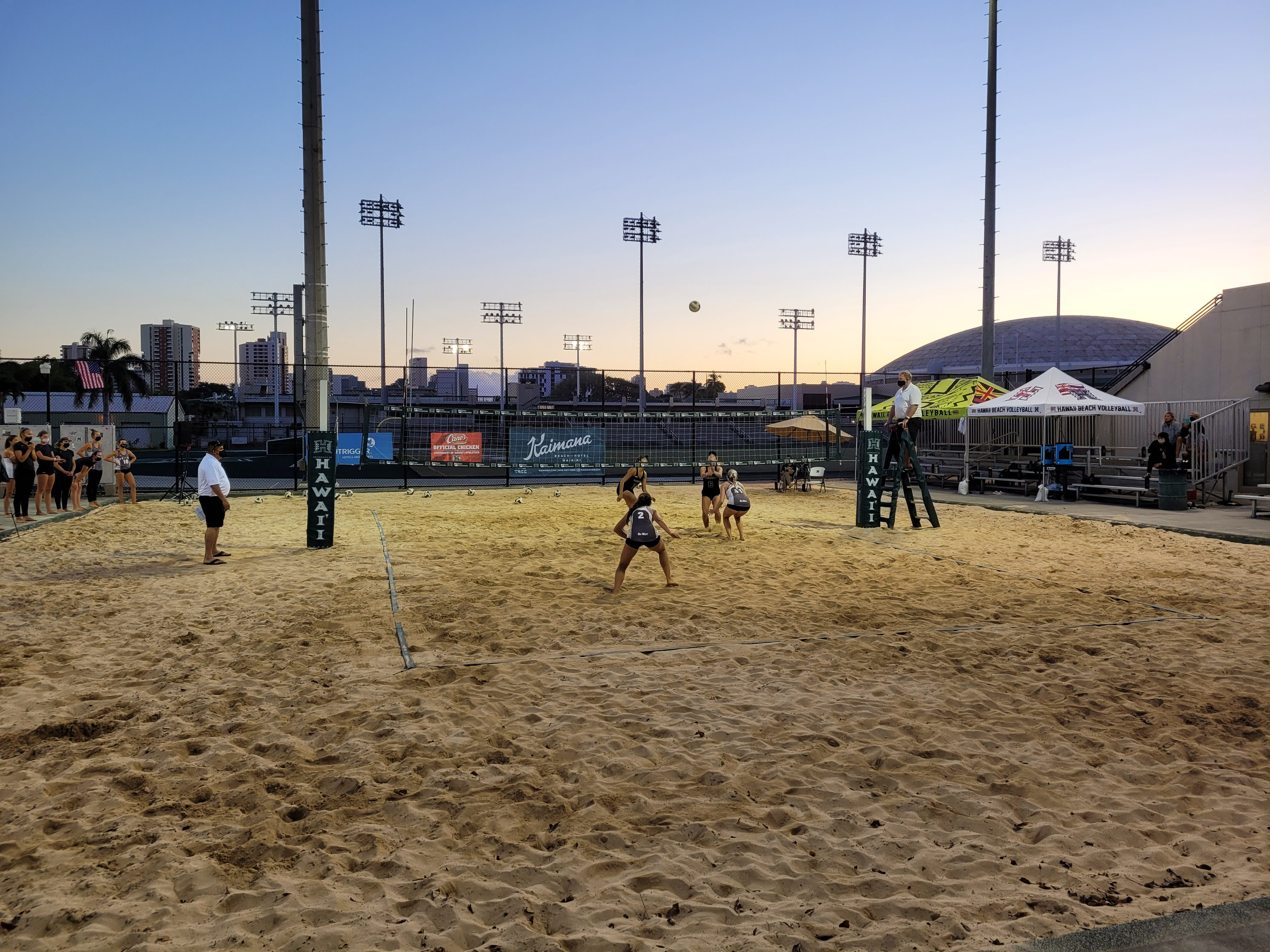
The complex's sandcourt as seen in 2021

Season	Head coach	Conference	Avg. crowd	Home record
2021	Todd Graham	Mountain West Conference	2,302	4–2
2022	Timmy Chang	Mountain West Conference	9,210	3–4
2023	Timmy Chang	Mountain West Conference	11,251	4–3
2024	Timmy Chang	Mountain West Conference	12,963	4–3
2025	Timmy Chang	Mountain West Conference	13,708	6–1
2026	Timmy Chang	Mountain West Conference	13,557	1–3

== See also ==
- List of NCAA Division I FBS football stadiums
- Les Murakami Stadium, located to the southeast of the complex
- Stan Sheriff Center, located to the west of the complex
