= 2023 Air Force Falcons football team =

American college football season

2023 Air Force Falcons football

Armed Forces Bowl champion

Armed Forces Bowl, W 31–21 vs. James Madison
- Conference: Mountain West Conference
- Record: 9–4 (5–3 MW)
- Head coach: Troy Calhoun (17th season)
- Offensive coordinator: Mike Thiessen (15th season)
- Offensive scheme: Triple option
- Defensive coordinator: Brian Knorr (2nd season)
- Base defense: 3–4
- Captains: Thor Paglialong; Trey Taylor; Bo Richter
- Home stadium: Falcon Stadium

Uniform
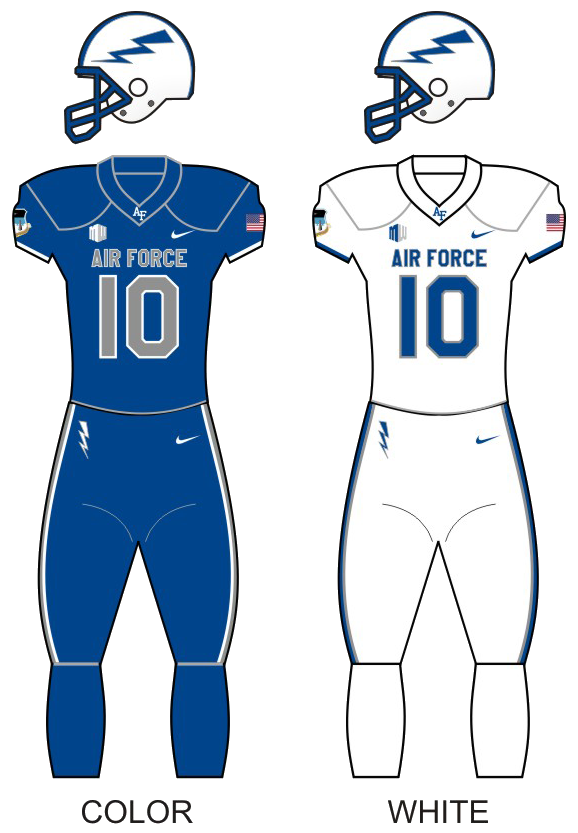

2023 Mountain West Conference football standings
	Conf.			Overall
Team	W		L	W		L
UNLV y	6	–	2	9	–	5
Boise State y$	6	–	2	8	–	6
San Jose State	6	–	2	7	–	6
Air Force	5	–	3	9	–	4
Wyoming	5	–	3	9	–	4
Fresno State	4	–	4	9	–	4
Utah State	4	–	4	6	–	7
Hawaii	3	–	5	5	–	8
Colorado State	3	–	5	5	–	7
Nevada	2	–	6	2	–	10
New Mexico	2	–	6	4	–	8
San Diego State	2	–	6	4	–	8
Championship: Boise State 44, UNLV 20
$ – Conference champion; y – Championship game participant

The 2023 Air Force Falcons football team represented the United States Air Force Academy as a member of the Mountain West Conference (MW) during the 2023 NCAA Division I FBS football season. Led by 17th-year head coach Troy Calhoun, the Falcons compiled an overall record of 9–4 with a mark of 5–3 in conference play, tying for fourth place in the MW. Air Force was invited to the Armed Forces Bowl, where the Falcons defeated James Madison. The team played home games at Falcon Stadium in Colorado Springs, Colorado.

The Air Force Falcons drew an average home attendance of 29,616 in 2023.

== Schedule ==
Date	Time	Opponent	Rank	Site	TV	Result	Attendance
September 2	11:00 a.m.	Robert Morris*		Falcon Stadium; Colorado Springs, CO	Altitude	W 42–7	30,142
September 9	6:00 p.m.	vs. Sam Houston*		NRG Stadium; Houston, TX	CBSSN	W 13–3	25,121
September 15	6:00 p.m.	Utah State		Falcon Stadium; Colorado Springs, CO	CBSSN	W 39–21	18,400
September 22	8:30 p.m.	at San Jose State		CEFCU Stadium; San Jose, CA	FS1	W 45–20	16,124
September 30	6:00 p.m.	San Diego State		Falcon Stadium; Colorado Springs, CO	CBSSN	W 49–10	24,869
October 14	5:00 p.m.	Wyoming		Falcon Stadium; Colorado Springs, CO	CBSSN	W 34–27	28,311
October 21	10:00 a.m.	at Navy*	No. 22	Navy-Marine Corps Memorial Stadium; Annapolis, MD (Commander-in-Chief's Trophy)	CBS	W 17–6	38,803
October 28	5:00 p.m.	at Colorado State	No. 19	Canvas Stadium; Fort Collins, CO (rivalry)	CBSSN	W 30–13	22,570
November 4	12:30 p.m.	vs. Army*	No. 25	Empower Field at Mile High; Denver, CO (Commander-in-Chief's Trophy)	CBSSN	L 3–23	52,401
November 11	9:00 p.m.	at Hawaii		Clarence T. C. Ching Athletics Complex; Honolulu, HI (rivalry)	SPEC PPV, MW Network	L 13–27	12,742
November 18	1:30 p.m.	UNLV		Falcon Stadium; Colorado Springs, CO	CBSSN	L 27–31	23,574
November 24	2:00 p.m.	at Boise State		Albertsons Stadium; Boise, ID	FS1	L 19–27	36,390
December 23	1:30 p.m.	vs. James Madison		Amon G. Carter Stadium; Fort Worth, TX (Armed Forces Bowl)	ABC	W 31–21	30,828
*Non-conference game; Rankings from AP Poll (and CFP Rankings, after October 31) - Released prior to game; All times are in Mountain time

== Rankings ==
Ranking movements Legend: ██ Increase in ranking ██ Decrease in ranking — = Not ranked RV = Received votes
	Week															
Poll	Pre	1	2	3	4	5	6	7	8	9	10	11	12	13	14	Final
AP	—	—	—	—	RV	RV	RV	22	19	17	RV	—	—	—	—	—
Coaches	RV	RV	RV	RV	RV	RV	RV	22	19	17	RV	RV	RV	—	—	RV
CFP	Not released									25	—	—	—	—	—	Not released

== Preseason ==
=== Mountain West media poll ===
The 2023 Mountain West preseason media poll was released on July 19. The Falcons were predicted to finish second in the conference.

== Game summaries ==
=== vs Robert Morris ===
Robert Morris Colonials (0–0) vs Air Force Falcons (0–0)

Quarter	1	2	3	4	Total
Colonials	0	0	0	7	7
Falcons	14	14	7	7	42

at Falcon Stadium, Colorado Springs, CO

- Date: September 2, 2023
- Game time: 11:00 a.m. MDT
- Game weather: Sunny
- Game attendance: 30,142
- Referee: Nolan Dumas
- TV announcers (Altitude): Vic Lombardi (Play-by-play), Ted Sundquist (Analyst), & Katy Winge (Sideline)
- ESPN – Zac Larrier rushes for two touchdowns, passes for another in Air Force's 42-7 win in season opener /// Goairforcefalcons.com – Robert Morris (0-1, 0-0) -VS- Air Force (1-0, 0-0)

Game information

First quarter

- (11:22) AF TD – Cade Harris 3-yard rush, Matthew Dapore kick
  Drive: 5 plays, 26 yards, 2:14; Air Force 7–0
- (03:27) AF TD – Zac Larrier 26-yard rush, Matthew Dapore kick
  Drive: 9 plays, 85 yards, 5:05; Air Force 14–0

Second quarter

- (12:31) AF TD – Zac Larrier 84-yard pass to Jared Roznos, Matthew Dapore kick
  Drive: 2 plays, 80 yards, 0:51; Air Force 21–0
- (01:58) AF TD – Owen Burk 27-yard rush, Matthew Dapore kick
  Drive: 11 plays, 88 yards, 5:46; Air Force 28–0

Third quarter

- (13:53) AF TD – Zac Larrier 4-yard rush, Matthew Dapore kick
  Drive: 3 plays, 75 yards, 1:07; Air Force 35–0

Fourth quarter

- (13:33) AF TD – Jensen Jones 7-yard rush, Reagan Tubbs kick
  Drive: 6 plays, 56 yards, 2:47; Air Force 42–0
- (10:35) RMU TD – Anthony Chiccitt 1-yard pass to Chaese Jackson, Jayson Jenkins kick
  Drive: 6 plays, 56 yards, 2:47; Air Force 42–7

Passing

- RMU – Anthony Chiccitt: 14/18, 99 yards, 1 TD
- AF – Zac Larrier: 2/3, 95 yards, 1 TD

Rushing

- RMU – Kimon O'Sullivan: 9 carries, 39 yards
- AF – Zac Larrier: 14 carries, 99 yards, 2 TD

Receiving

- RMU – Noah Robinson: 3 receptions, 36 yards
- AF – Jared Roznos: 1 reception, 84 yards, 1 TD

Defense

- RMU – Jamar Shegog: 12 total tackles (7 solo, 5 assisted)
- AF – Johnathan Youngblood: 7 total tackles (3 solo, 4 assisted)

Statistics	RMU	AF
First downs	9	24
3rd down efficiency	3–11	6–10
4th down efficiency	0–1	1–3
Plays–yards	50–156	59–469
Rushes–yards	26–43	56–374
Passing yards	113	95
Passing: Comp–Att–Int	18–24–0	2–3–0
Penalties–yards	9–61	2–10
Turnovers	2	1
Time of possession	27:49	32:11

=== vs Sam Houston ===
Air Force Falcons (1–0) vs Sam Houston Bearkats (0–1)

Quarter	1	2	3	4	Total
Falcons	0	3	0	10	13
Bearkats	0	0	3	0	3

at NRG Stadium, Houston, TX

- Date: September 9, 2023
- Game time: 6:00 p.m. MDT
- Game weather: Indoor
- Game attendance: 25,121
- TV announcers (CBSSN): Carter Blackburn (Play-by-play) & Robert Turbin (Analyst)
- ESPN – Air Force uses familiar ground assault to churn out 13-3 win over Sam Houston /// Goairforcefalcons.com – Air Force (2-0, 0-0) -VS- Sam Houston (0-2, 0-0)

Game information

First quarter

- No Scoring

Second quarter

- (08:36) AF FG – Matthew Dapore 42-yard field goal
  Drive: 9 plays, 47 yards, 5:03; Air Force 3–0

Third quarter

- (06:03) SAM FG – Colby Sessums 45-yard field goal
  Drive: 13 plays, 33 yards, 6:49; Tied 3–3

Fourth quarter

- (13:41) AF FG – Matthew Dapore 42-yard field goal
  Drive: 13 plays, 45 yards, 7:15; Air Force 6–3
- (05:14) AF TD – Owen Burk 7-yard rush, Matthew Dapore kick
  Drive: 11 plays, 60 yards, 6:20; Air Force 13–3

Passing

- AF – Zac Larrier: 1/3, 14 yards
- SAM – Keegan Shoemaker: 8/14, 44 yards

Rushing

- AF – Owen Burk: 8 carries, 75 yards, 1 TD
- SAM – Zach Hrbacek: 10 carries, 29 yards

Receiving

- AF – John Lee Eldridge III: 1 reception, 14 yards
- SAM – Ife Adeyi: 3 receptions, 20 yards

Defense

- AF – Alec Mock: 11 total tackles (6 solo, 5 assisted), 1 tackle for loss
- SAM – Trevor Williams: 14 total tackles (11 solo, 3 assisted), 1 tackle for loss

Statistics	AF	SAM
First downs	18	6
3rd down efficiency	5–13	3–13
4th down efficiency	0–1	1–1
Plays–yards	62–258	44–80
Rushes–yards	59–244	30–36
Passing yards	14	44
Passing: Comp–Att–Int	1–3–0	8–14–0
Penalties–yards	2–20	2–25
Turnovers	1	0
Time of possession	36:38	23:22

=== vs Utah State ===
Utah State Aggies (1–1) vs Air Force Falcons (2–0)

Quarter	1	2	3	4	Total
Aggies	0	7	7	7	21
Falcons	22	10	7	0	39

at Falcon Stadium, Colorado Springs, CO

- Date: September 15, 2023
- Game time: 6:00 p.m. MDT
- Game weather: Cloudy
- Game attendance: 18,400
- Referee: Patrick Foy
- TV announcers (CBSSN): Alex Del Barrio (Play-by-play), Robert Turbin (Analyst), & Emily Proud (Color)
- ESPN – Michel runs for three TDs, leads Air Force over Utah State 39-21 /// Goairforcefalcons.com – Utah St. (1-2, 0-1) -VS- Air Force (3-0, 1-0)

Game information

First quarter

- (07:04) AF TD – Emmanuel Michel 1-yard rush, Emmanuel Michel rush
  Drive: 12 plays, 63 yards, 6:57; Air Force 8–0
- (05:17) AF TD – Zac Larrier 4-yard rush, Matthew Dapore kick
  Drive: 3 plays, 11 yards, 1:16; Air Force 15–0
- (00:11) AF TD – Emmanuel Michel 2-yard rush, Matthew Dapore kick
  Drive: 7 plays, 79 yards, 4:00; Air Force 22–0

Second quarter

- (11:15) AF TD – John Lee Eldridge III 13-yard rush, Matthew Dapore kick
  Drive: 5 plays, 72 yards, 2:48; Air Force 29–0
- (01:58) USU TD – McCae Hillstead 2-yard pass to Terrell Vaughn, Elliott Nimrod kick
  Drive: 11 plays, 57 yards, 4:38; Air Force 29–7
- (00:00) AF FG – Matthew Dapore 49-yard field goal
  Drive: 8 plays, 43 yards, 1:58; Air Force 32–7

Third quarter

- (08:45) AF TD – Emmanuel Michel 2-yard rush, Matthew Dapore kick
  Drive: 10 plays, 46 yards, 6:14; Air Force 39–7
- (05:10) USU TD – McCae Hillstead 9-yard pass to Jalen Royals, Elliott Nimrod kick
  Drive: 10 plays, 79 yards, 3:28; Air Force 39–14

Fourth quarter

- (08:43) USU TD – McCae Hillstead 6-yard pass to Micah Davis, Elliott Nimrod kick
  Drive: 7 plays, 65 yards, 2:02; Air Force 39–21

Passing

- USU – McCae Hillstead: 18/27, 202 yards, 3 TD
- AF – Zac Larrier: 3/4, 84 yards

Rushing

- USU – Rahsul Faison: 7 carries, 40 yards
- AF – Owen Burk: 15 carries, 110 yards

Receiving

- USU – Micah Davis: 8 receptions, 84 yards, 1 TD
- AF – Jared Roznos: 1 reception, 49 yards

Defense

- USU – Ike Larsen: 11 total tackles (5 solo, 6 assisted)
- AF – Alec Mock: 11 total tackles (8 solo, 3 assisted), 2 sacks, 2 tackles for loss, 1 passes defended

Statistics	USU	AF
First downs	20	24
3rd down efficiency	3–11	9–13
4th down efficiency	2–3	1–1
Plays–yards	61–302	68–428
Rushes–yards	26–54	64–344
Passing yards	248	84
Passing: Comp–Att–Int	20–35–1	3–4–0
Penalties–yards	4–17	6–60
Turnovers	2	0
Time of possession	21:20	38:40

=== at San Jose State ===
Air Force Falcons (3–0) at San Jose State Spartans (1–3)

Quarter	1	2	3	4	Total
Falcons	3	14	7	21	45
Spartans	6	14	0	0	20

at CEFCU Stadium, San Jose, CA

- Date: September 22, 2023
- Game time: 8:30 p.m. MDT
- Game weather: Temperature: 67 °F (19 °C) • Wind: SE at 9 miles per hour (14 km/h) • Weather: Sunny
- Game attendance: 16,124
- Referee: Christian Watson
- TV announcers (FS1): Dan Hellie (Play-by-play) & Petros Papadakis (Analyst)
- ESPN – Michel, Eldridge help Air Force run over San Jose State 45-20 for 8th straight win /// Goairforcefalcons.com – Air Force (4-0, 2-0) -VS- San Jose St. (1-4, 0-1)

Game information

First quarter

- (10:43) SJS TD – Chevan Cordeiro 10-yard rush, Kyler Halvorsen PAT failed
  Drive: 8 plays, 75 yards, 4:17; San Jose State 6–0
- (03:02) AF FG – Reagan Tubbs 30-yard field goal
  Drive: 13 plays, 62 yards, 7:41; San Jose State 6–3

Second quarter

- (10:53) AF TD – Emmanuel Michel 17-yard rush, Reagan Tubbs kick
  Drive: 10 plays, 65 yards, 4:55; Air Force 10–6
- (07:57) SJS TD – Kairee Robinson 29-yard rush, Kyler Halvorsen kick
  Drive: 6 plays, 60 yards, 2:52; San Jose State 13–10
- (03:24) SJS TD – Kairee Robinson 1-yard rush, Kyler Halvorsen kick
  Drive: 5 plays, 64 yards, 2:29; San Jose State 20–10
- (00:25) AF TD – Emmanuel Michel 4-yard rush, Reagan Tubbs kick
  Drive: 12 plays, 75 yards, 2:59; San Jose State 20–17

Third quarter

- (06:18) AF TD – John Lee Eldridge III 5-yard rush, Reagan Tubbs kick
  Drive: 15 plays, 75 yards, 8:42; Air Force 24–20

Fourth quarter

- (12:50) AF TD – Emmanuel Michel 1-yard rush, Reagan Tubbs kick
  Drive: 13 plays, 71 yards, 7:38; Air Force 31–20
- (07:51) AF TD – John Lee Eldridge III 34-yard rush, Reagan Tubbs kick
  Drive: 4 plays, 40 yards, 2:05; Air Force 38–20
- (02:20) AF TD – Jet Harris 2-yard rush, Reagan Tubbs kick
  Drive: 5 plays, 22 yards, 2:56; Air Force 45–20

Passing

- AF – Zac Larrier: 2/2, 28 yards
- SJS – Chevan Cordeiro: 24/35, 238 yards, 1 INT

Rushing

- AF – Emmanuel Michel: 33 carries, 148 yards, 3 TD
- SJS – Kairee Robinson: 7 carries, 82 yards, 2 TD

Receiving

- AF – Jared Roznos: 1 reception, 22 yards
- SJS – Dominick Mazotti: 5 receptions, 60 yards

Defense

- AF – Trey Taylor: 8 total tackles (4 solo, 4 assisted), 1 tackle for loss
- SJS – Taniela Latu: 13 total tackles (7 solo, 6 assisted), 1.5 tackle for loss

Statistics	AF	SJS
First downs	25	18
3rd down efficiency	10–15	3–8
4th down efficiency	3–3	0–2
Plays–yards	75–428	52–354
Rushes–yards	73–400	17–115
Passing yards	28	239
Passing: Comp–Att–Int	2–2–0	24–35–1
Penalties–yards	4–43	6–48
Turnovers	0	1
Time of possession	39:05	20:55

=== vs San Diego State ===
San Diego State Aztecs (2–3) vs Air Force Falcons (4–0)

Quarter	1	2	3	4	Total
Aztecs	0	10	0	0	10
Falcons	0	21	21	7	49

at Falcon Stadium, Colorado Springs, CO

- Date: September 30, 2023
- Game time: 6:00 p.m. MDT
- Game weather: Sunny
- Game attendance: 24,869
- Referee: Nolan Dumas
- TV announcers (CBSSN): Rich Waltz (Play-by-play), Aaron Taylor (Analyst), & Tiffany Blackmon (Sideline)
- ESPN – Larrier, Michel lead Air Force to 49-10 romp over San Diego State /// Goairforcefalcons.com – San Diego St. (2-4, 0-2) -VS- Air Force (5-0, 3-0)

Game information

First quarter

- No Scoring

Second quarter

- (13:34) SDSU TD – Jalen Mayden 21-yard pass to Joshua Nicholson, Jack Browning kick
  Drive: 17 plays, 80 yards, 9:32; San Diego State 7–0
- (10:31) AF TD – Cade Harris 7-yard rush, Matthew Dapore kick
  Drive: 7 plays, 75 yards, 3:03; Tied 7–7
- (04:21) AF TD – Emmanuel Michel 2-yard rush, Matthew Dapore kick
  Drive: 9 plays, 53 yards, 5:04; Air Force 14–7
- (00:43) AF TD – Emmanuel Michel 3-yard rush, Matthew Dapore kick
  Drive: 6 plays, 80 yards, 2:09; Air Force 21–7
- (00:00) SDSU FG – Jack Browning 61-yard field goal
  Drive: 8 plays, 31 yards, 0:43; Air Force 21–10

Third quarter

- (12:04) AF TD – Zac Larrier 54-yard pass to Cade Harris, Matthew Dapore kick
  Drive: 6 plays, 75 yards, 2:56; Air Force 28–10
- (07:18) AF TD – Zac Larrier 53-yard pass to Jared Roznos, Matthew Dapore kick
  Drive: 6 plays, 79 yards, 3:00; Air Force 35–10
- (07:09) AF TD – Trey Taylor 30-yard interception return, Matthew Dapore kick
  Drive: 1 plays, 0 yards, 0:09; Air Force 42–10

Fourth quarter

- (09:45) AF TD – Jensen Jones 4-yard rush, Reagan Tubbs kick
  Drive: 16 plays, 85 yards, 10:20; Air Force 49–10

Passing

- SDSU – Jalen Mayden: 13/24, 122 yards, 1 TD, 1 INT
- AF – Zac Larrier: 6/7, 189 yards, 2 TD

Rushing

- SDSU – Kenan Christon: 14 carries, 58 yards
- AF – Zac Larrier: 8 carries, 103 yards

Receiving

- SDSU – Mark Redman: 2 receptions, 27 yards
- AF – Cade Harris: 2 receptions, 82 yards, 1 TD

Defense

- SDSU – Zyrus Fiaseu: 9 total tackles (2 solo, 7 assisted)
- AF – Alec Mock: 6 total tackles (5 solo, 1 assisted), 1 tackles for loss

Statistics	SDSU	AF
First downs	14	24
3rd down efficiency	4–13	4–8
4th down efficiency	3–4	2–2
Plays–yards	55–227	59–476
Rushes–yards	30–105	52–287
Passing yards	122	189
Passing: Comp–Att–Int	13–25–1	6–7–0
Penalties–yards	5–34	1–5
Turnovers	1	0
Time of possession	27:55	32:05

=== vs Wyoming ===
Wyoming Cowboys (5–1) vs Air Force Falcons (5–0)

Quarter	1	2	3	4	Total
Cowboys	14	7	0	6	27
Falcons	7	10	7	10	34

at Falcon Stadium, Colorado Springs, CO

- Date: October 14, 2023
- Game time: 5:00 p.m. MDT
- Game weather: Sunny
- Game attendance: 28,311
- Referee: Cal McNeill
- TV announcers (CBSSN): Rich Waltz (Play-by-play), Aaron Taylor (Analyst), & Justin Walters (Sideline)
- ESPN – John Lee Eldridge III goes the distance, capping Air Force's rally past Wyoming /// Goairforcefalcons.com – Wyoming (5-2, 2-1) -VS- Air Force (6-0, 4-0)

Game information

First quarter

- (10:23) WYO TD – Andrew Peasley 1-yard rush, John Hoyland kick
  Drive: 10 plays, 75 yards, 4:37; Wyoming 7–0
- (03:59) WYO TD – Andrew Peasley 6-yard pass to Wyatt Wieland, John Hoyland kick
  Drive: 9 plays, 69 yards, 5:23; Wyoming 14–0
- (00:26) AF TD – Owen Burk 15-yard rush, Matthew Dapore kick
  Drive: 7 plays, 75 yards, 3:33; Wyoming 14–7

Second quarter

- (07:09) AF TD – Zac Larrier 17-yard pass to John Lee Eldridge III, Matthew Dapore kick
  Drive: 8 plays, 72 yards, 4:13; Tied 14–14
- (01:43) WYO TD – Andrew Peasley 14-yard pass to Ayir Asante, John Hoyland kick
  Drive: 12 plays, 75 yards, 5:26; Wyoming 21–14
- (00:00) AF FG – Matthew Dapore 24-yard field goal
  Drive: 8 plays, 68 yards, 1:43; Wyoming 21–17

Third quarter

- (04:47) AF TD – Zac Larrier 1-yard rush, Matthew Dapore kick
  Drive: 17 plays, 75 yards, 10:13; Air Force 24–21

Fourth quarter

- (11:31) AF FG – Matthew Dapore 43-yard field goal
  Drive: 11 plays, 45 yards, 5:02; Air Force 27–21
- (06:14) WYO TD – Andrew Peasley 14-yard pass to Treyton Welch, John Hoyland PAT blocked
  Drive: 5 plays, 25 yards, 1:45; Tied 27–27
- (02:17) AF TD – John Lee Eldridge III 58-yard rush, Matthew Dapore kick
  Drive: 3 plays, 65 yards, 1:13; Air Force 34–27

Passing

- WYO – Andrew Peasley: 15/25, 212 yards, 3 TD
- AF – Zac Larrier: 6/9, 58 yards, 1 TD

Rushing

- WYO – Andrew Peasley: 13 carries, 48 yards, 1 TD
- AF – Zac Larrier: 20 carries, 111 yards, 1 TD

Receiving

- WYO – Sam Scott: 3 receptions, 43 yards
- AF – Jared Roznos: 3 receptions, 34 yards

Defense

- WYO – Easton Gibbs: 12 total tackles (7 solo, 5 assisted)
- AF – Trey Taylor: 10 total tackles (7 solo, 3 assisted), 1 tackles for loss, 1 blocked kick

Statistics	WYO	AF
First downs	18	22
3rd down efficiency	9–15	7–10
4th down efficiency	1–2	1–1
Plays–yards	60–321	62–414
Rushes–yards	35–109	53–356
Passing yards	212	58
Passing: Comp–Att–Int	15–25–0	6–9–0
Penalties–yards	3–25	1–9
Turnovers	0	2
Time of possession	30:13	29:49

=== at Navy ===
No. 22 Air Force Falcons (6–0) at Navy Midshipmen (3–3)

Quarter	1	2	3	4	Total
No. 22 Falcons	0	7	3	7	17
Midshipmen	0	0	0	6	6

at Navy–Marine Corps Memorial Stadium, Annapolis, MD

- Date: October 21, 2023
- Game time: 10:00 p.m. MDT
- Game weather: Temperature: 61 °F (16 °C) • Wind: NW at 14 miles per hour (23 km/h) • Weather: Clear
- Game attendance: 38,803
- Referee: Jonathan Noli
- TV announcers (CBS): Rich Waltz (Play-by-play), Aaron Taylor (Analyst), & Amanda Guerra (Sideline)
- ESPN – Zac Larrier throws a 94-yard touchdown and No. 22 Air Force shuts down Navy 17-6 /// Goairforcefalcons.com – Air Force (7-0, 4-0) -VS- Navy (3-4, 2-2)

Game information

First quarter

- No Scoring

Second quarter

- (14:48) AF TD – Zac Larrier 94-yard pass to Dane Kinamon, Matthew Dapore kick
  Drive: 2 plays, 94 yards, 0:29; Air Force 7–0

Third quarter

- (05:55) AF FG – Matthew Dapore 40-yard field goal
  Drive: 9 plays, 35 yards, 4:27; Air Force 10–0

Fourth quarter

- (03:51) AF TD – Alec Mock 18-yard interception return, Matthew Dapore kick
  Drive: 3 plays, 0 yards, 0:17; Air Force 17–0
- (00:50) NAV TD – Tai Lavatai 10-yard pass to Eli Heidenreich, Two-Point conversion failed
  Drive: 15 plays, 78 yards, 3:01; Air Force 17–6

Passing

- AF – Zac Larrier: 4/5, 151 yards, 1 TD
- NAV – Tai Lavatai: 13/23, 96 yards, 1 TD, 2 INT

Rushing

- AF – Emmanuel Michel: 22 carries, 69 yards
- NAV – Alex Tecza: 12 carries, 24 yards

Receiving

- AF – Dane Kinamon: 1 reception, 94 yards, 1 TD
- NAV – Alex Tecza: 4 receptions, 27 yards

Defense

- AF – Johnathan Youngblood: 13 total tackles (7 solo, 6 assisted), 2 tackle for loss
- NAV – Colin Ramos: 11 total tackles (4 solo, 7 assisted), 1 sack, 1 tackle for loss

Statistics	AF	NAV
First downs	8	10
3rd down efficiency	1–13	3–17
4th down efficiency	2–2	2–2
Plays–yards	53–288	64–124
Rushes–yards	48–137	35–22
Passing yards	151	102
Passing: Comp–Att–Int	4–5–0	15–29–2
Penalties–yards	5–30	4–50
Turnovers	1	2
Time of possession	31:44	28:16

For the game against Navy, Air Force commemorated the Doolittle Raiders with the 2023 edition of the Air Power Legacy Series uniforms.

The Doolittle Raiders were the 80 crew members of 16 B-25B Mitchell bombers who launched the first raid on mainland Japan during World War II on April 18, 1942, led by United States Army Air Force Lt. Col. James H. "Jimmy" Doolittle.

The uniform featured a chrome helmet with an image of a B-25 aircraft on the right side, while the left bore the Raiders squadron patch designed by the Doolittle Tokyo Raiders Association. The jersey featured letters and numbers resembling the riveted aluminum used in the B-25's construction. The left sleeve featured another Raiders squadron patch. The pants featured the roundel logo on the left front, which includes the roundel that appeared on the aircraft. The Raiders mantra, "Ever into Peril", appeared down the right side of the pants, while the French translation "Toujours au Danger" is on the left leg.

=== at Colorado State ===
No. 19 Air Force Falcons (7–0) at Colorado State Rams (3–4)

Quarter	1	2	3	4	Total
No. 19 Falcons	7	6	10	7	30
Rams	0	13	0	0	13

at Canvas Stadium, Fort Collins, CO

- Date: October 28, 2023
- Game time: 5:00 p.m. MDT
- Game weather: Temperature: 26 °F (−3 °C) • Wind: E at 4 miles per hour (6.4 km/h) • Weather: Snow
- Game attendance: 22,570
- Referee: Michael Cuttone
- TV announcers (CBSSN): Rich Waltz (Play-by-play), Aaron Taylor (Analyst), & Brandon Baylor (Sideline)
- ESPN – No. 19 Air Force overcomes snow, snowballs in 30-13 win over Colorado State to stay unbeaten /// Goairforcefalcons.com – Air Force (8-0, 5-0) -VS- Colorado St. (3-5, 1-3)

Game information

First quarter

- (05:03) AF TD – Zac Larrier 9-yard pass to Dane Kinamon, Matthew Dapore kick
  Drive: 12 plays, 54 yards, 6:44; Air Force 7–0

Second quarter

- (14:38) CSU TD – Brayden Fowler-Nicolosi 61-yard pass to Justus Ross-Simmons, Jordan Noyes kick
  Drive: 1 plays, 54 yards, 0:08; Tied 7–7
- (07:15) CSU FG – Jordan Noyes 40-yard field goal
  Drive: 12 plays, 67 yards, 3:44; Colorado State 10–7
- (04:00) AF TD – John Lee Eldridge III 10-yard rush, Matthew Dapore PAT failed
  Drive: 3 plays, 11 yards, 1:31; Air Force 13–10
- (00:45) CSU FG – Jordan Noyes 49-yard field goal
  Drive: 8 plays, 43 yards, 3:15; Tied 13–13

Third quarter

- (08:58) AF TD – Zac Larrier 1-yard rush, Matthew Dapore kick
  Drive: 10 plays, 75 yards, 6:02; Air Force 20–13
- (00:45) AF FG – Matthew Dapore 29-yard field goal
  Drive: 8 plays, 69 yards, 4:47; Air Force 23–13

Fourth quarter

- (08:51) AF TD – Emmanuel Michel 5-yard rush, Matthew Dapore kick
  Drive: 3 plays, 36 yards, 2:00; Air Force 30–13

Passing

- AF – Zac Larrier: 4/7, 32 yards, 1 TD
- CSU – Brayden Fowler-Nicolosi: 28/45, 297 yards, 1 TD

Rushing

- AF – Emmanuel Michel: 20 carries, 130 yards, 1 TD
- CSU – Vann Schield: 14 carries, 53 yards

Receiving

- AF – Brandon Engel: 1 reception, 14 yards
- CSU – Justus Ross-Simmons: 8 receptions, 128 yards, 1 TD

Defense

- AF – Jalen Mergerson: 13 total tackles (9 solo, 4 assisted), 2 passes defended
- CSU – Nuer Gatkuoth: 15 total tackles (3 solo, 12 assisted), 1.5 tackle for loss

Statistics	AF	CSU
First downs	18	17
3rd down efficiency	8–15	5–13
4th down efficiency	1–1	0–3
Plays–yards	64–293	64–339
Rushes–yards	57–261	19–42
Passing yards	32	297
Passing: Comp–Att–Int	4–7–0	28–45–0
Penalties–yards	2–15	5–54
Turnovers	0	1
Time of possession	35:58	24:02

=== vs Army ===
Army Black Knights (2–6) vs No. 25 Air Force Falcons (8–0)

Quarter	1	2	3	4	Total
Black Knights	17	6	0	0	23
No. 25 Falcons	0	3	0	0	3

at Empower Field at Mile High, Denver, CO

- Date: November 4, 2023
- Game time: 12:30 p.m. MDT
- Game weather: Sunny
- Game attendance: 52,401
- Referee: Marcus Woods
- TV announcers (CBSSN): John Sadak (Play-by-play), Randy Cross (Analyst), & Tina Cervasio (Sideline)
- ESPN – Army's swarming defense forces 6 turnovers in 23-3 win, deals No. 17 Air Force first loss of season /// Goairforcefalcons.com – Army West Point (3-6, 0-0) -VS- Air Force (8-1, 5-0)

Game information

First quarter

- (13:06) ARMY TD – Bryson Daily 62-yard rush, Quinn Maretzki kick
  Drive: 4 plays, 75 yards, 1:54; Army 7–0
- (09:42) ARMY FG – Quinn Maretzki 45-yard field goal
  Drive: 4 plays, 6 yards, 1:23; Army 10–0
- (01:53) ARMY TD – Bryson Daily 5-yard rush, Quinn Maretzki kick
  Drive: 11 plays, 43 yards, 6:12; Army 17–0

Second quarter

- (13:14) ARMY FG – Quinn Maretzki 40-yard field goal
  Drive: 6 plays, 24 yards, 3:01; Army 20–0
- (02:31) AF FG – Matthew Dapore 30-yard field goal
  Drive: 9 plays, 59 yards, 3:08; Army 20–3
- (00:00) ARMY FG – Quinn Maretzki 38-yard field goal
  Drive: 3 plays, 4 yards, 0:19; Army 23–3

Third quarter

- No Scoring

Fourth quarter

- No Scoring

Passing

- ARMY – Bryson Daily: 4/9, 40 yards
- AF – Zac Larrier: 9/22, 93 yards, 2 INT

Rushing

- ARMY – Bryson Daily: 36 carries, 170 yards, 2 TD
- AF – Zac Larrier: 20 carries, 45 yards

Receiving

- ARMY – Tryell Robinson: 1 reception, 23 yards
- AF – Wyatt Wilson: 3 receptions, 47 yards

Defense

- ARMY – Leo Lowin: 12 total tackles (9 solo, 3 assisted), 1 sack, 2 tackle for loss, 1 pass defended
- AF – Jayden Goodwin: 12 total tackles (3 solo, 9 assisted), 0.5 tackle for loss

Statistics	ARMY	AF
First downs	11	19
3rd down efficiency	4–14	5–14
4th down efficiency	1–2	0–2
Plays–yards	60–253	64–259
Rushes–yards	51–213	40–155
Passing yards	40	104
Passing: Comp–Att–Int	4–9–0	10–24–2
Penalties–yards	11–119	6–55
Turnovers	0	6
Time of possession	32:09	27:51

=== at Hawaii ===
Air Force Falcons (8–1) at Hawaii Rainbow Warriors (3–7)

Quarter	1	2	3	4	Total
Falcons	0	3	7	3	13
Rainbow Warriors	7	6	7	7	27

at Clarence T. C. Ching Athletics Complex, Honolulu, HI

- Date: November 11, 2023
- Game time: 9:00 p.m. MDT
- Game weather: Temperature: 78 °F (26 °C) • Wind: NE at 20 miles per hour (32 km/h) • Weather: Sunny
- Game attendance: 12,742
- Referee: Patrick Foy
- TV announcers (SPEC PPV/MW Network): Kanoa Leahey (Play-by-play), Rich Miano (Analyst), & Jordan Helle (Sideline)
- ESPN – Brayden Schager accounts for 3 TDs, Hawaii hands Air Force first MWC loss, 27-13 /// Goairforcefalcons.com – Air Force (8-2, 5-1) -VS- Hawaii (4-7, 2-4)

Game information

First quarter

- (07:58) HAW TD – Pofele Ashlock 5-yard pass to Brayden Schager, Matthew Shipley kick
  Drive: 12 plays, 75 yards, 7:02; Hawaii 7–0

Second quarter

- (03:11) AF FG – Matthew Dapore 25-yard field goal
  Drive: 20 plays, 61 yards, 11:49; Hawaii 7–3
- (00:02) HAW TD – Brayden Schager 1-yard rush, Matthew Shipley PAT failed
  Drive: 9 plays, 75 yards, 3:09; Hawaii 13–3

Third quarter

- (12:46) AF TD – Dylan Carson 35-yard rush, Matthew Dapore kick
  Drive: 5 plays, 75 yards, 2:14; Hawaii 13–10
- (07:20) HAW TD – Pofele Ashlock 19-yard pass to Brayden Schager, Matthew Shipley kick
  Drive: 11 plays, 75 yards, 5:26; Hawaii 20–10

Fourth quarter

- (11:09) HAW FR – Meki Pei 32-yard fumble recovery, Matthew Shipley kick
  Hawaii 27–10
- (06:20) AF FG – Matthew Dapore 21-yard field goal
  Drive: 12 plays, 68 yards, 4:42; Hawaii 27–13

Passing

- AF – Jensen Jones: 3/7, 114 yards, 1 INT
- HAW – Brayden Schager: 22/29, 176 yards, 2 TD

Rushing

- AF – Dylan Carson: 13 carries, 87 yards, 1 TD
- HAW – Brayden Schager: 8 carries, 62 yards, 1 TD

Receiving

- AF – Cade Harris: 1 reception, 65 yards
- HAW – Pofele Ashlock: 12 receptions, 67 yards, 2 TD

Defense

- AF – Alec Mock: 10 total tackles (6 solo, 4 assisted)
- HAW – Peter Manuma: 12 total tackles (7 solo, 5 assisted)

Statistics	AF	HAW
First downs	17	18
3rd down efficiency	7–14	8–13
4th down efficiency	1–1	0–0
Plays–yards	56–315	58–297
Rushes–yards	47–201	29–121
Passing yards	114	176
Passing: Comp–Att–Int	3–9–3	22–29–0
Penalties–yards	3–25	5–56
Turnovers	4	0
Time of possession	29:26	30:34

=== vs. UNLV ===
UNLV Rebels (8–2) vs Air Force Falcons (8–2)

Quarter	1	2	3	4	Total
Rebels	7	7	14	3	31
Falcons	7	20	0	0	27

at Falcon Stadium, Colorado Springs, CO

- Date: November 18, 2023
- Game time: 4:00 p.m. MDT
- Game weather: Clear, 74 °F (23 °C)
- Game attendance: 23,574
- Referee: Christian Watson
- TV announcers (CBSSN): Carter Blackburn (Play-by-play) & Randy Cross (Analyst)
- ESPN – UNLV shuts out Air Force in 2nd half, takes Mountain West lead with 31-27 win /// Goairforcefalcons.com – UNLV (9-2, 6-1) -VS- Air Force (8-3, 5-2)

Game information

First quarter

- (12:48) UNLV TD – Ricky White 78-yard pass to Jayden Maiava, Jose Pizano kick
  Drive: 2 plays, 79 yards, 0:34; UNLV 7–0
- (00:26) AF TD – John Lee Eldridge III 55-yard rush, Matthew Dapore kick
  Drive: 7 plays, 94 yards, 3:25; Tied 7–7

Second quarter

- (11:37) AF TD – Jensen Jones 1-yard rush, Matthew Dapore kick
  Drive: 6 plays, 74 yards, 2:26; Air Force 14–7
- (07:03) AF FG – Matthew Dapore 27-yard field goal
  Drive: 6 plays, 62 yards, 3:03; Air Force 17–7
- (05:36) AF TD – Jensen Jones 1-yard rush, Matthew Dapore kick
  Drive: 3 plays, 11 yards, 0:58; Air Force 24–7
- (01:41) UNLV TD – Vincent Davis 12-yard rush, Jose Pizano kick
  Drive: 8 plays, 75 yards, 3:55; Air Force 24–14
- (00:00) AF FG – Matthew Dapore 42-yard field goal
  Drive: 6 plays, 50 yards, 1:41; Air Force 27–14

Third quarter

- (14:04) UNLV TD – Donavyn Lester 1-yard rush, Jose Pizano kick
  Drive: 3 plays, 85 yards, 0:52; Air Force 27–21
- (02:55) UNLV TD – Kaleo Ballungay 6-yard pass to Jayden Maiava, Jose Pizano kick
  Drive: 10 plays, 70 yards, 4:35; UNLV 28–27

Fourth quarter

- (10:53) UNLV FG – Jose Pizano 39-yard field goal
  Drive: 11 plays, 45 yards, 5:10; UNLV 31–27

Passing

- UNLV – Jayden Maiava: 15/29, 339 yards, 2 TD, 2 INT
- AF – Jensen Jones: 1/6, 35 yards

Rushing

- UNLV – Jayden Maiava: 8 carries, 36 yards
- AF – Dylan Carson: 16 carries, 104 yards

Receiving

- UNLV – Ricky White III: 8 receptions, 169 yards, 1 TD
- AF – Caleb Rillos: 1 reception, 35 yards

Defense

- UNLV – Marsel McDuffie: 15 total tackles (10 solo, 5 assisted)
- AF – Trey Williams: 9 total tackles (6 solo, 3 assisted), 1 pass defended

Statistics	UNLV	AF
First downs	15	22
3rd down efficiency	3–13	3–14
4th down efficiency	1–1	1–2
Plays–yards	63–465	71–404
Rushes–yards	33–114	62–344
Passing yards	351	60
Passing: Comp–Att–Int	16–30–2	3–9–0
Penalties–yards	10–120	4–30
Turnovers	2	1
Time of possession	26:26	33:34

== Personnel ==
=== Coaching staff ===
2023 Air Force Football Coaching Staff
Name	Position	Season	College
Troy Calhoun	Head coach	17th	Air Force (1989)
Marc Bacote	Tight Ends	2nd	James Madison (2000)
Jake Campbell	Slot Backs	12th	Air Force (1996)
Tim Horton	Running Backs, Special Teams Coordinator	3rd	Arkansas (1989)
Charlie Jackson	Asst. head coach/defensive backs coach	2nd	Air Force (2000)
Brian Knorr	Defensive Coordinator	1st	Air Force (1986)
Ken Lamendola	Inside Linebackers	2nd	Air Force (2011)
Steed Lobotzke	Offensive Line	9th	Air Force (1992)
Matt McGettigan	Director of Speed - Strength & Conditioning	17th	Luther College (1987)
Alex Means	Defensive Line	2nd	Air Force (2013)
Brett Skene	Specialists/Assistant Offensive Line	2nd	Air Force (2011)
Taylor Stubblefield	Wide Receivers Coach	1st	Purdue (2005)
Mike Thiessen	Off. Coordinator, Quarterbacks	17th	Air Force (2001)
Nick Toth	Safeties	2nd	Ohio (1999)
E.J. Whitlow	Defensive Ends	2nd	Findlay (2010)
Kale Pearson	Director of Recruiting	2nd	Air Force (2015)
Chuck Petersen	Football Executive/Assistant Recruiting Director	1st	Air Force (1985)
Anthony Wright	Defensive Assistant	2nd	Air Force (2012)

=== Roster ===
(Please note that the Air Force football team rarely lists freshman players on their official roster)

2023 Air Force Falcons Football Roster
Quarterback: 5 – Jensen Jones, Senior (6'2, 215); 9 – Zac Larrier, Senior (6'0, 195); 12 – John Busha, Sophomore (6'2, 205); 15 – Ben Brittain, Senior (6'1, 190); 17 – Cannon Turner, Senior (6'0, 215); Running back: 8 – Christopher Frew, Sophomore (5'9, 190); 10 – Jalen Johnson, Senior (5'8, 185); 20 – Dylan Carson, Sophomore (6'0, 210); 24 – John Lee Eldridge III, Senior (5'9, 200); 25 – Tylor Latham, Sophomore (5'8, 180); 26 – Owen Burk, Senior (5'11, 200); 27 – Kaden Cloud, Sophomore (5'9, 185); 28 – Aiden Calvert, Junior (5'10, 205); 30 – Kale Gibbs, Junior (5'8, 175); 33 – Jet Harris, Senior (6'1, 225); 34 – Darius Stone, Sophomore (5'11, 205); Wide receiver: 2 – Brandon Engel, Junior (6'2, 210); 6 – Cameron Breier, Junior (6'2, 195); 11 – Wyatt Wilson, Senior (6'3, 195); 13 – Jared Roznos, Junior (6'0, 190); 16 – Dylan Evans, Sophomore (5'11, 185); 18 – Kendin Alexander, Junior (5'10, 165); 21 – Cade Harris, Junior (5'8, 180); 23 – Dane Kinamon, Senior (6'0, 205); 29 – Evan Rau, Sophomore (5'9, 170); 32 – Jordan Scarbrough, Sophomore (5'8, 185); 80 – Tre Roberson, Sophomore (6'2, 205); 87 – Quin Smith, Sophomore (6'1, 190); 89 – Parker St. John, Junior (6'2, 190); Tight end: 81 – James Bryant, Senior (6'4, 230); 82 – Connor McIntee, Senior (6'3, 235); 83 – Chances Carter-Hill, Sophomore (6'2, 230); 84 – Caleb Rillos, Senior (6'5, 255); 85 – Parker Menefee, Sophomore (6'6, 240); 88 – Bruin Fleischmann, Sophomore (6'3, 220); Specialist: 43 – Matthew Dapore, Junior (6'0, 195); 95 – Carson Bay, Junior (5'11, 165); 96 – Reagan Tubbs, Sophomore (6'0, 175); 97 – Luke Freer, Sophomore (6'4, 220)	Fullback: 4 – Emmanuel Michel, Senior (5'10, 210); Offensive Lineman: 51 – Kaleb Holcomb, Senior (6'4, 270); 53 – Steven Iles, Senior (6'2, 285); 54 – Jackson Kohal, Junior (6'4, 305); 55 – Nick Blessing, Sophomore (6'4, 250); 56 – Mark Hiestand, Senior (6'5, 285); 57 – Gabriel Averitt, Sophomore (6'3, 270); 59 – Adam Karas, Senior (6'4, 285); 60 – John Gordon Jr., Junior (6'2, 205); 61 – Costen Cooley, Sophomore (6'4, 279); 62 – Matthew Heitmann, Junior (6'4, 290); 64 – Luke Hallstrom, Senior (6'2, 270); 65 – Samuel Floysand, Sophomore (6'3, 275); 66 – Jace Sutulovich, Sophomore (6'3, 285); 68 – Thor Paglialong, Senior (6'4, 300); 69 – Wesley Ndago, Senior (6'2, 300); 71 – Michael McAninch, Junior (6'3, 300); 72 – Christien Hawks, Sophomore (6'3, 290); 73 – Luke Vonderhaar, Sophomore (6'4, 270); 74 – Mason Carlan, Senior (6'3, 290); 75 – Ethan Jackman, Senior (6'4, 310); 76 – Alex Moore, Junior (6'3, 270); 77 – Cameron Collins, Sophomore (6'3, 260); 78 – Trevor Tate, Sophomore (6'2, 270); Defensive Lineman: 8 – Bo Richter, Senior (6'2, 250); 13 – PJ Ramsey, Senior (6'2, 260); 48 – Jayden Thiergood, Senior (6'3, 250); 55 – Kupono Blake, Senior (6'2, 270); 57 – Colin Stewart, Sophomore (6'2, 240); 62 – James Tomasi, Junior (6'0, 310); 87 – Caden Blum, Senior (6'5, 265); 90 – Brian Bradley, Sophomore (6'2, 230); 92 – Jackson Garrett, Sophomore (6'3, 270); 93 – Andrew BoisD'Enghien, Senior (6'3, 280); 94 – Kaleb Tompkins, Junior (6'4, 260); 95 – Daniel Grobe, Sophomore (6'7, 270); 96 – Payton Zdroik, Junior (6'0, 275); 97 – Brent Winfree, Sophomore (6'4, 275); 99 – Aidan Swartz, Sophomore (6'4, 270)	Linebacker: 6 – Matthew Malloy, Senior (6'3, 215); 18 – Elijah Sanders, Junior (6'3, 240); 24 – Robert Mbroh, Junior (6'3, 220); 27 – Julian Williams, Junior (6'2, 230); 35 – Jack Curtis, Sophomore (6'5, 245); 32 – Osaro Aihie, Junior (6'1, 225); 38 – Ty Hubert, Sophomore (5'11, 200); 40 – Alec Mock, Senior (6'3, 240); 41 – Jackson Adams, Sophomore (6'4, 240); 44 – Johnathan Youngblood, Senior (5'11, 225); 45 – Matt Devine, Junior (6'0, 225); 46 – Zach Juckel, Sophomore (6'2, 210); 47 – Kyler Orr, Sophomore (6'1, 210); 50 – Grant Uyl, Junior (5'11, 225); 51 – Victor Dubuclet, Sophomore (6'0, 210); 52 – Matthew Reddick, Sophomore (6'2, 230); 54 – Are'an Burr, Sophomore (6'3, 220); 56 – Cole Palmer, Junior (6'4, 235); Defensive back: 0 – Trey Williams, Junior (5'10, 175); 3 – Jamari Bellamy, Junior (6'2, 185); 5 – Corey Collins, Senior (5'11, 185); 7 – Trey Taylor, Senior (6'0, 210); 9 – Levi Brown, Sophomore (6'1, 175); 10 – Jalen Mergerson, Senior (5'11, 210); 11 – Camby Goff, Senior (6'1, 215); 12 – Patrick Dahlen, Senior (6'3, 210); 14 – K.C. Beard, Junior (6'1, 200); 15 – Jake Martin, Junior (6'2, 200); 16 – Jayden Goodwin, Senior (6'1, 195); 17 – Zion Kelly, Senior (5'10, 190); 19 – C.J. Boyd, Junior (6'1, 200); 20 – Jake Smith, Senior (6'1, 210); 21 – Aidan Plate, Junior (6'2, 200); 22 – Jerome Gaillard Jr., Junior (6'4, 200); 28 – Terrance Cullivan, Sophomore (5'10, 185); 30 – Tyme Collins, Junior (6'0, 210); 42 – Jakobi McGowan, Junior (6'1, 205); Long snapper: 41 – J. Frank Melgarejo III, Senior (6'0, 225); 48 – Anthony DeBerardino, Junior (6'1, 210); 49 – Kurt Chesney, Sophomore (6'0, 195)
