= 2023 Mountain West Conference Football Championship Game =

- Conference Championship
Boise State Broncos	UNLV Rebels
(7–5)	(9–3)
44	20
Head coach: Spencer Danielson (interim)	Head coach: Barry Odom
	1	2	3	4	Total
Boise State	14	17	10	3	44
UNLV	7	10	3	0	20
- Date: December 2, 2023
- Season: 2023
- Stadium: Allegiant Stadium
- Location: Las Vegas, NV
- MVP: Offensive: Taylen Green, Boise State; Defensive: Alexander Teubner, Boise State
- Favorite: Boise State by 2.5
- Attendance: 31,473

United States TV coverage
- Network: Fox
- Announcers: Jason Benetti, Brock Huard, and Allison Williams

2023 Mountain West Conference football standings
	Conf.			Overall
Team	W		L	W		L
UNLV y	6	–	2	9	–	5
Boise State y$	6	–	2	8	–	6
San Jose State	6	–	2	7	–	6
Air Force	5	–	3	9	–	4
Wyoming	5	–	3	9	–	4
Fresno State	4	–	4	9	–	4
Utah State	4	–	4	6	–	7
Hawaii	3	–	5	5	–	8
Colorado State	3	–	5	5	–	7
Nevada	2	–	6	2	–	10
New Mexico	2	–	6	4	–	8
San Diego State	2	–	6	4	–	8
Championship: Boise State 44, UNLV 20
$ – Conference champion; y – Championship game participant

The 2023 Mountain West Conference Football Championship Game was a college football game which was played on December 2, 2023, at Allegiant Stadium in the Las Vegas-area community of Paradise, Nevada. It was the 11th edition of the Mountain West Conference Football Championship Game and determined the champion of the Mountain West Conference (MW) for the 2023 season. The game began at 12:00 p.m. PST and was aired on Fox. The game featured the Boise State Broncos and the UNLV Rebels.

== Teams ==
Boise State, UNLV, and San José State all finished with a 6–2 conference record, creating a three-way tie. Since all three teams did not face each other during the season and no team was ranked in the College Football Playoff (CFP) rankings before the game, the three-way tie was broken by computer rankings from Anderson & Hester, Colley Matrix, Massey and Wolfe. UNLV finished with the best average rankings, while Boise State came in second and San José State came in third. Therefore, the Broncos and Rebels secured their spots in the MW Championship. UNLV and Boise State did not play each other during the regular season. The Rebels had the higher average ranking and earned the right to host the title game.

=== UNLV Rebels ===
The Rebels, who entered the game with a 9–3 record, 6–2 in conference play, were making their first MW title game appearance.

=== Boise State Broncos ===
The Broncos entered the game with a 7–5 record, 6–2 in conference play. They made their second consecutive Mountain West title game appearance and seventh overall. They were 3–3 in previous appearances, having last won the title in 2019.

== Scoring summary ==
2023 Mountain West Championship
Boise State Broncos (7–5, 6-2) vs. UNLV Rebels (9–3, 6–2)

Quarter	1	2	3	4	Total
Boise State	14	17	10	3	44
UNLV	7	10	3	0	20

at Allegiant Stadium • Las Vegas, NV

- Date: Saturday, December 2, 2023
- Game time: 12:00 p.m. PST
- TV announcers (FOX): Jason Benetti, Brock Huard, Allison Williams

Game information

First Quarter

- (11:08) BSU – Taylen Green 8 yard rush, Jonah Dalmas kick (Drive: 7 plays, 75 yards, 3:52; Boise State 7–0)
- (6:45) UNLV – Vincent Davis Jr. 5 yard rush, Jose Pizano kick (Drive: 12 plays, 87 yards, 4:18; Tied 7–7)
- (2:21) BSU – Ashton Jeanty 5 yard rush, Jonah Dalmas kick (Drive: 8 plays, 75 yards, 4:24; BSU 14–7)

Second Quarter

- (14:49) UNLV – Fred Thompkins 47 yard interception return, Jose Pizano kick (Tied 14–14)
- (13:32) BSU – Austin Bolt 57 yard pass from Taylen Green, Jonah Dalmas kick (Drive: 3 plays, 75 yards, 1:17; Boise State 21–14)
- (12:10) BSU – Taylen Green 70 yard rush, Jonah Dalmas kick (Drive: 1 play, 70 yards, 0:12; Boise State 28–14)
- (7:23) BSU – Jonah Dalmas 31 yard field goal (Drive: 7 plays, 16 yards, 3:31; Boise State 31–14)
- (3:35) UNLV – Jose Pizano 51 yard field goal (Drive: 9 plays, 42 yards, 3:48; Boise State 31–17)

Third Quarter

- (11:07) UNLV – Jose Pizano 46 yard field goal (Drive: 12 plays, 45 yards, 3:47; Boise State 31–20)
- (5:03) BSU – Jonah Dalmas 50 yard field goal (Drive: 10 plays, 41 yards, 6:04; Boise State 34–20)
- (0:16) BSU – Matt Lauter 16 yard pass from Taylen Green, Jonah Dalmas kick (Drive: 6 plays, 59 yards, 3:01; Boise State 41–20)

Fourth Quarter

- (3:43) BSU – Jonah Dalmas 22 yard field goal (Drive: 7 plays, 79 yards, 4:12; Boise State 44–20)

Statistics	BSU	UNLV
First downs	23	16
Plays–yards	66–527	66–298
Rushes–yards	51–301	28–81
Passing yards	226	217
Passing: comp–att–int	12–15–1	18–38–2
Turnovers		
Time of possession	37:10	22:50

Team	Category	Player	Statistics
Boise State	Passing	Taylen Green	12/15, 226 yards, 2 TD, INT
Boise State	Rushing	Ashton Jeanty	21 carries, 153 yards, TD
Boise State	Receiving	Billy Bowens	4 receptions, 91 yards
UNLV	Passing	Jayden Maiava	15/29, 166 yards, 2 INT
UNLV	Rushing	Vincent Davis Jr.	14 carries, 55 yards, TD
UNLV	Receiving	Ricky White III	6 receptions, 86 yards
