= 2023 Boise State Broncos football team =

American college football season

2023 Boise State Broncos football

MW champion

MW Championship Game, W 44–20 vs. UNLV

LA Bowl, L 22–35 vs. UCLA
- Conference: Mountain West Conference
- Record: 8–6 (6–2 MW)
- Head coach: Andy Avalos (3rd season; first 10 games); Spencer Danielson (interim; remainder of season)
- Offensive coordinator: Bush Hamdan (1st season)
- Offensive scheme: West Coast
- Defensive coordinator: Spencer Danielson (3rd season)
- Co-defensive coordinator: Kane Ioane (3rd season)
- Base defense: 4–2–5
- Home stadium: Albertsons Stadium

Uniform
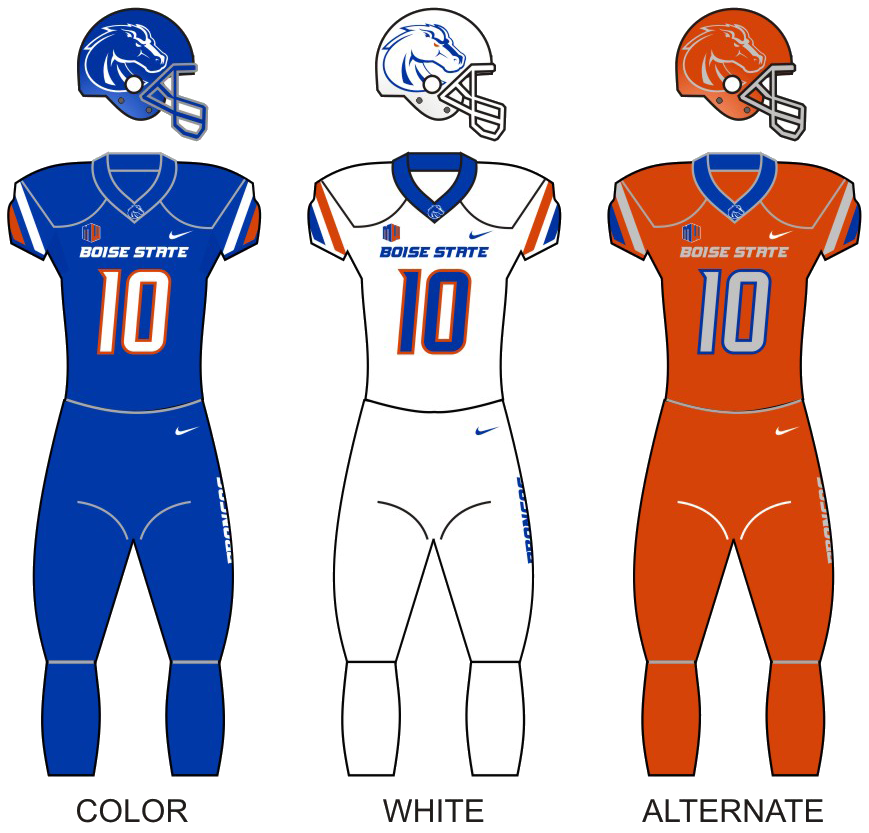

2023 Mountain West Conference football standings
	Conf.			Overall
Team	W		L	W		L
UNLV y	6	–	2	9	–	5
Boise State y$	6	–	2	8	–	6
San Jose State	6	–	2	7	–	6
Air Force	5	–	3	9	–	4
Wyoming	5	–	3	9	–	4
Fresno State	4	–	4	9	–	4
Utah State	4	–	4	6	–	7
Hawaii	3	–	5	5	–	8
Colorado State	3	–	5	5	–	7
Nevada	2	–	6	2	–	10
New Mexico	2	–	6	4	–	8
San Diego State	2	–	6	4	–	8
Championship: Boise State 44, UNLV 20
$ – Conference champion; y – Championship game participant

The 2023 Boise State Broncos football team represented Boise State University as a member of the Mountain West Conference during the 2023 NCAA Division I FBS football season. Led by third-year head coach Andy Avalos, the Broncos played their home games on campus at Albertsons Stadium in Boise, Idaho. The Boise State Broncos football team drew an average home attendance of 35,867 in 2023.

On November 12, with Boise State sitting 5–5 (4–2 in Mountain West play), Avalos was fired with two games remaining in the regular season. Defensive Coordinator Spencer Danielson was named interim head coach for the remainder of the season. Avalos finished 22–14 (17–6 conference) in just shy of three full seasons.

== Schedule ==
Date	Time	Opponent	Site	TV	Result	Attendance
September 2	1:30 p.m.	at No. 10 Washington*	Husky Stadium; Seattle, WA	ABC	L 19–56	67,475
September 9	5:00 p.m.	UCF*	Albertsons Stadium; Boise, ID	FS1	L 16–18	36,447
September 16	10:00 a.m.	No. 14 (FCS) North Dakota*	Albertsons Stadium; Boise, ID	FS1	W 42–18	35,610
September 22	8:30 p.m.	at San Diego State	Snapdragon Stadium; San Diego, CA	CBSSN	W 34–31	23,374
September 30	2:00 p.m.	at Memphis*	Simmons Bank Liberty Stadium; Memphis, TN	ESPN2	L 32–35	30,364
October 7	6:00 p.m.	San Jose State^{†}	Albertsons Stadium; Boise, ID	CBSSN	W 35–27	37,491
October 14	7:45 p.m.	at Colorado State	Canvas Stadium; Fort Collins, CO	FS1	L 30–31	34,901
October 28	3:30 p.m.	Wyoming	Albertsons Stadium; Boise, ID	FS2	W 32–7	35,189
November 4	8:00 p.m.	at Fresno State	Valley Children's Stadium; Fresno, CA (rivalry)	CBSSN	L 30–37	41,031
November 11	8:00 p.m.	New Mexico	Albertsons Stadium; Boise, ID	FS1	W 42–14	34,076
November 18	5:00 p.m.	at Utah State	Maverik Stadium; Logan, UT	CBSSN	W 45–10	17,821
November 24	2:00 p.m.	Air Force	Albertsons Stadium; Boise, ID	FS1	W 27–19	36,390
December 2	1:00 p.m.	at UNLV	Allegiant Stadium; Paradise, NV (MW Championship Game)	FOX	W 44–20	31,473
December 16	5:30 p.m.	vs. UCLA*	SoFi Stadium; Inglewood, CA (LA Bowl)	ABC	L 22–35	32,780
*Non-conference game; ^{†}Homecoming; Rankings from AP Poll (and CFP Rankings, after November 7) released prior to game; All times are in Mountain time

== Roster ==
2023 Boise State Broncos football team roster
Players
Coaches
Offense

Pos.	#	Name	Class
QB	0	C. J. Tiller	Fr
RB	1	Jambres Dubar	Fr
RB	2	Ashton Jeanty	So
TE	3	Riley Smith	GS
QB	4	Maddux Madsen	Fr
WR	5	Stefan Cobbs	GS
WR	7	Latrell Caples	Jr
WR	9	Shea Whiting	Sr
QB	10	Taylen Green	So
WR	13	Chase Penry	So
QB	14	Max Cutforth	Fr
QB	15	Colt Fulton	So
WR	17	Prince Strachan	Fr
WR	18	Billy Bowens	GS
RB	24	George Holani	Sr
RB	25	Kaden Dudley	So
RB	26	Taylor Marcum	Fr
RB	33	Tyler Crowe	Sr
RB	37	Ethan Mikita	Fr
WR	46	Hunter Steacker	Fr
TE	48	Oliver Fisher	Fr
TE	49	Jack Beresford	So
OL	57	Nathan Cardona	Jr
OL	61	Nikolai Bujnowski	So
OL	62	Roger Carreon	Fr
OL	63	Mason Randolph	So
OL	64	Cameron Rasmussen	Fr
OL	65	Hall Schmidt	Fr
OL	66	Ben Dooley	Sr
OL	67	Jason Steele	Fr
OL	68	Bridjer Bivens	Fr
OL	69	Garrett Curran	GS
OL	70	Kyle Cox	Fr
OL	71	Beresford	GS
OL	72	Zach Holmes	So
OL	73	Ethan Carde	Sr
OL	75	Favor Komolafe	So
OL	76	Rick Moore	So
OL	77	Kage Casey	Fr
OL	78	Tyler Keinath	So
WR	80	Eric McAlister	So
WR	81	Austin Bolt	Jr
WR	82	Ben Ford	So
WR	83	Cole Wright	Jr
WR	84	Zamondre Merriweather	Fr
TE	85	Matt Lauter	So
TE	86	Austin Terry	Fr
TE	87	Cayden Dawson	Fr
TE	88	Matt Wagner	Fr
WR	89	Jackson Grier	Fr
TE	96	Luke Voorhees	So

Defense

Pos.	#	Name	Class
S	4	Rodney Robinson	Jr
CB	6	Jaylen Clark	Jr
CB	8	Markel Reed	Sr
OLB	10	Andrew Simpson	So
CB	14	Kaonohi Kaniho	Jr
DE	15	Tyler Wegis	Jr
CB	16	Franklyn Johnson Jr.	Fr
CB	18	Gabe Tahir	Fr
S	20	Ty Benefield	Fr
CB	21	A'Marion McCoy	Jr
CB	22	Titus Toler	Sr
S	23	Seyi Oladipo	Jr
S	25	Nick Hawthorne	Fr
CB	26	Khai Taylor	Fr
CB	27	Dionte Thornton	Fr
S	28	Seth Knothe	Fr
S	29	Milo Lopez	Jr
LB	30	Wyatt Milkovic	Fr
S	31	Zion Washington	So
S	32	Bryce Cleave	So
DL	33	Cortez Hogans	GS
S	34	Alexander Teubner	Sr
S	36	Cole Miller	Fr
S	37	Ryker Clinger	Fr
DE	38	Demitri Washington	GS
CB	39	Jalen Neal	So
DE	40	Jayden Virgin	Fr
S	41	Boen Phelps	Fr
LB	43	Jake Ripp	Fr
DE	44	Kivon Wright	Fr
DE	45	James Wilborn Jr.	So
CB	47	Jacob Williams	Fr
CB	49	Troy Wilkey	Fr
LB	50	Dishawn Misa	Fr
LB	51	Chase Martin	Fr
OLB	52	D. J. Schramm	GS
OLB	53	Marco Notarainni	So
DE	54	Gabe Hunter	Jr
LB	55	Gavin Hambrick	Fr
DE	56	Mason Jacobsen	Fr
LB	59	Brett Tommasini	So
DT	60	Spencer Gieg	Fr
DT	74	Kyler Williams	Fr
DL	90	Braxton Fely	So
DT	91	Ahmed Hassanein	Jr
DT	92	Michael Callahan	Sr
DE	93	Demanuel Brown Jr.	Fr
DT	94	Sheldon Newton	Sr
DT	95	Max Stege	Fr
DT	96	Howard Brown	So
DT	97	J. J. Talo	Fr
DT	98	Herbert Gums	Jr
DT	99	Michael Madrie	Fr

Special teams

Pos.	#	Name	Class
K/P	35	Jonah Dalmas	Sr
LS	42	Mason Hutton	So
K	45	Wyatt Redding	Fr
P	46	James Ferguson-Reynolds	So
LS	47	Koby Tryggestad	Sr
K	58	Josh Horn	Fr

Head coach

- Andy Avalos

Coordinators/assistant coaches

- Erik Chinander – Assistant Head Coach/Defensive run game coordinator/Defensive linemen
- Bush Hamdan – Offensive coordinator/Quarterbacks
- Kane Ioane – Co-defensive coordinator/Safeties
- Spencer Danielson – Co-defensive coordinator/Inside linebackers
- Matt Miller – Wide receivers
- Nate Potter – Run game coordinator/Tight ends
- Demario Warren – Cornerbacks/Special Teams
- Jabril Frazier – Edge rushers
- James Montgomery – Running backs
- Tim Keane – Offensive linemen
- Benjamin Hilgart – Director, Strength and Conditioning
- Lance Anderson – Offensive analyst
- Derrick McMahen - Special Teams Quality Control
- B.J. Mullin - Defensive Quality Control
- Taylor Kolste – Offensive analyst
- Ron Collins – Defensive analyst
- Zane Busekist – Graduate assistant
- Calin Criner – Graduate assistant
- Will Farrar – Graduate assistant
- Marshawn Friloux – Graduate assistant
- Deontrae Cooper- Recruiting Coordinator

Legend

- (C) Team captain
- (S) Suspended
- (I) Ineligible
- Injured
- Redshirt

Roster
Last update: 8/14/23

== Transfers ==
=== Outgoing ===
- Jacob Golden, OL, transferred to New Mexico State
- Sam Vidlak, QB, transferred to Montana
- Gavin Wale, P, transferred to BYU
- Russell Corrigan, TE, transferred to Concordia University, Saint Paul
- Elelyon Noa, RB
- Isiah Bagnah, DE, transferred to BYU
- Hank Bachmeier, QB, transferred to Louisiana Tech
- Andy Nwaoko, DE, transferred to Stony Brook
- Isaiah Bradford, DB, transferred to BYU
- Rejhan Tatum, LB
- Dallas Holiday, OL, transferred to Portland State
- Deven Wright, DE, transferred to Texas State
- Will Ferrin, K, transferred to BYU
- Tyneil Hopper, TE, transferred to Michigan State
- Taequan Tyler, RB
- Roman Kafentzis, DB
- Jalen Richmond, WR, transferred to Iowa Western Community College
- Casey Kline, DE/TE, transferred to Central Oklahoma

=== Incoming ===
- Kivon Wright, DE, transferred from Boston College
- Titus Toler, DB, transferred from Wisconsin
- Sheldon Newton, DT, transferred from Northern Arizona
- Chase Penry, WR, transferred from Colorado
- Tyler Wegis, DE, transferred from Utah
- Milo Lopez, DB, transferred from Cerritos College
- A’Marion McCoy, DB, transferred from Laney College
- Nikolai Bujnowski, OL, transferred from Virginia Tech
- Howard Brown, DL, transferred from Iowa State
- Ethan Carde, OL, transferred from Texas Tech
- Tyler Keinath, OL, transferred from Western Illinois
