= 2023 UNLV Rebels football team =

American college football season

2023 UNLV Rebels football

Mountain West Championship Game, L 20–44 vs. Boise State

Guaranteed Rate Bowl, L 36–49 vs. Kansas
- Conference: Mountain West Conference
- Record: 9–5 (6–2 MW)
- Head coach: Barry Odom (1st season)
- Offensive coordinator: Brennan Marion (1st season)
- Offensive scheme: Pro spread
- Defensive coordinator: Mike Scherer (1st season)
- Base defense: Multiple
- Home stadium: Allegiant Stadium

2023 Mountain West Conference football standings
| | Conf. | | | Overall |
| Team | W | | L | W | | L |
|---|---|---|---|---|---|---|
| UNLV y | 6 | – | 2 | 9 | – | 5 |
| Boise State y$ | 6 | – | 2 | 8 | – | 6 |
| San Jose State | 6 | – | 2 | 7 | – | 6 |
| Air Force | 5 | – | 3 | 9 | – | 4 |
| Wyoming | 5 | – | 3 | 9 | – | 4 |
| Fresno State | 4 | – | 4 | 9 | – | 4 |
| Utah State | 4 | – | 4 | 6 | – | 7 |
| Hawaii | 3 | – | 5 | 5 | – | 8 |
| Colorado State | 3 | – | 5 | 5 | – | 7 |
| Nevada | 2 | – | 6 | 2 | – | 10 |
| New Mexico | 2 | – | 6 | 4 | – | 8 |
| San Diego State | 2 | – | 6 | 4 | – | 8 |
Championship: Boise State 44, UNLV 20
$ – Conference champion; y – Championship game participant

The 2023 UNLV Rebels football team represented the University of Nevada, Las Vegas (UNLV) as a member of the Mountain West Conference (MW) during the 2023 NCAA Division I FBS football season. Led by first-year head coach Barry Odom, the Rebels compiled an overall record of 9–5 record with a mark of 6–2 in conference play, placing in a three-way with Boise State and San Jose State for first place in the MW. UNLV advanced to the Mountain West Championship Game, where the Rebels lost to Boise State. UNLV was then invited to the Guaranteed Rate Bowl, losing to Kansas. The team played home games at Allegiant Stadium in Paradise, Nevada.

2023 was the first season winning season for the program, and the first season in which Rebels appeared in a bowl game since 2013.

== Schedule ==
| Date | Time | Opponent | Site | TV | Result | Attendance |
|---|---|---|---|---|---|---|
| September 2 | 1:00 p.m. | Bryant* | Allegiant Stadium; Paradise, NV | KVVU | W 44–14 | 20,347 |
| September 9 | 12:30 p.m. | at No. 2 Michigan* | Michigan Stadium; Ann Arbor, MI | CBS | L 7–35 | 109,482 |
| September 16 | 4:00 p.m. | Vanderbilt* | Allegiant Stadium; Paradise, NV | CBSSN | W 40–37 | 22,582 |
| September 23 | 6:00 p.m. | at UTEP* | Sun Bowl; El Paso, TX | ESPN+ | W 45–28 | 28,042 |
| September 30 | 1:00 p.m. | Hawaii | Allegiant Stadium; Paradise, NV | KVVU, SPEC PPV | W 44–20 | 25,328 |
| October 14 | 2:00 p.m. | at Nevada | Mackay Stadium; Reno, NV (Fremont Cannon) | KVVU, KNSN-TV | W 45–27 | 24,578 |
| October 21 | 4:00 p.m. | Colorado State^{†} | Allegiant Stadium; Paradise, NV | KVVU | W 25–23 | 22,585 |
| October 28 | 7:30 p.m. | at Fresno State | Valley Children's Stadium; Fresno, CA | FS1 | L 24–31 | 41,031 |
| November 4 | 3:00 p.m. | at New Mexico | University Stadium; Albuquerque, NM | MW Network | W 56–14 | 12,353 |
| November 10 | 7:45 p.m. | Wyoming | Allegiant Stadium; Paradise, NV | FS1 | W 34–14 | 25,568 |
| November 18 | 12:30 p.m. | at Air Force | Falcon Stadium; Colorado Springs, CO | CBSSN | W 31–27 | 23,574 |
| November 25 | 12:00 p.m. | San Jose State | Allegiant Stadium; Paradise, NV | KVVU | L 31–37 | 25,554 |
| December 2 | 12:00 p.m. | Boise State | Allegiant Stadium; Paradise, NV (MW Championship Game) | FOX | L 20–44 | 31,473 |
| December 26 | 6:00 pm | vs. Kansas | Chase Field; Phoenix, AZ (Guaranteed Rate Bowl) | ESPN | L 36–49 | 26,478 |
*Non-conference game; ^{†}Homecoming; Rankings from AP Poll released prior to the game; All times are in Pacific time

== Rankings ==
Ranking movements Legend: ██ Increase in ranking ██ Decrease in ranking — = Not ranked RV = Received votes
| | Week | | | | | | | | | | | | | | | |
| Poll | Pre | 1 | 2 | 3 | 4 | 5 | 6 | 7 | 8 | 9 | 10 | 11 | 12 | 13 | 14 | Final |
|---|---|---|---|---|---|---|---|---|---|---|---|---|---|---|---|---|
| AP | — | — | — | — | — | — | — | — | RV | — | — | RV | RV | — | | |
| Coaches | — | — | — | — | — | — | — | RV | RV | RV | RV | RV | RV | RV | | |
| CFP | Not released | | | | | | | | | — | — | — | — | — | | Not released |

== Game summaries ==
=== vs Bryant ===
Bryant Bulldogs (0–0) vs UNLV Rebels (0–0) – Game summary

| Quarter | 1 | 2 | 3 | 4 | Total |
|---|---|---|---|---|---|
| Bulldogs | 0 | 0 | 7 | 7 | 14 |
| Rebels | 17 | 7 | 17 | 3 | 44 |

at Allegiant Stadium • Paradise, NV

- Date: September 2, 2023
- Game time: 1:00 p.m.
- Game weather: None (Indoor stadium)
- Game attendance: 20,347
- Referee: Kenneth Ray
- TV announcers (KVVU): Steve Cofield, Matt Neverett

Game information

First quarter

- (14:16) UNLV – Vincent Davis 69-yard run, Jose Pizano kick (Drive: 1 play, 69 yards, 0:38; UNLV 7–0)
- (8:49) UNLV – Jai'Den Thomas 18-yard run, Jose Pizano kick (Drive: 7 plays, 41 yards, 2:38; UNLV 14–0)
- (1:06) UNLV – Jose Pizano 48-yard field goal (Drive: 8 plays, 34 yards, 2:16; UNLV 17–0)

Second quarter

- (0:00) UNLV – Doug Brumfield 19-yard run, Jose Pizano kick (Drive: 6 plays, 37 yards, 1:22; UNLV 24–0)

Third quarter

- (7:30) UNLV – Jose Pizano 37-yard field goal (Drive: 7 plays, 35 yards, 2:34; UNLV 27–0)
- (3:52) BRY – Ryan Clark 1-yard run, Ethan Gettman kick (Drive: 8 plays, 75 yards, 3:38; UNLV 27–7)
- (3:26) UNLV – Donavyn Lester 2-yard run, Jose Pizano kick (Drive: 1 play, 2 yards, 0:03; UNLV 34–7)
- (0:08) UNLV – Jai'Den Thomas 8-yard run, Jose Pizano kick (Drive: 6 plays, 54 yards, 1:44; UNLV 41–7)

Fourth quarter

- (12:40) BRY – Ryan Clark 1-yard run, Ethan Gettman kick (Drive: 5 plays, 75 yards, 4:33; UNLV 41–14)
- (6:39) UNLV – Jose Pizano 35-yard field goal (Drive: 14 plays, 60 yards, 5:43; UNLV 44–14)

| Statistics | BRY | UNLV |
|---|---|---|
| First downs | 19 | 20 |
| Total yards | 409 | 394 |
| Rushing yards | 40–179 | 40–268 |
| Passing yards | 230 | 126 |
| Passing: Comp–Att–Int | 19–31–1 | 15–24–1 |
| Time of possession | 39:04 | 20:56 |

| Team | Category | Player | Statistics |
|---|---|---|---|
| Bryant | Passing | Zevi Eckhaus | 19/29, 230 yards, INT |
| Bryant | Rushing | Zevi Eckhaus | 9 carries, 89 yards |
| Bryant | Receiving | Landon Ruggieri | 11 receptions, 109 yards |
| UNLV | Passing | Doug Brumfield | 11/18, 86 yards, INT |
| UNLV | Rushing | Vincent Davis | 3 carries, 79 yards, TD |
| UNLV | Receiving | Jacob De Jesus | 4 receptions, 50 yards |

=== at No. 2 Michigan ===
UNLV Rebels (1–0) at No. 2 Michigan Wolverines (1–0) – Game summary

| Quarter | 1 | 2 | 3 | 4 | Total |
|---|---|---|---|---|---|
| Rebels | 0 | 0 | 0 | 7 | 7 |
| Wolverines | 7 | 14 | 14 | 0 | 35 |

at Michigan Stadium • Ann Arbor, MI

- Date: September 9, 2023
- Game time: 3:30 p.m. EDT
- Game weather: Cloudy, 69 °F (21 °C)
- Game attendance: 109,482
- Referee: Jeffrey Servinski
- TV announcers (CBS): Brad Nessler, Gary Danielson, Jenny Dell

Game information

First quarter

- (7:06) MICH – Blake Corum 3-yard run, James Turner kick (Drive: 9 plays, 80 yards, 4:37; Michigan 7–0)

Second quarter

- (14:56) MICH – Blake Corum 2-yard run, James Turner kick (Drive: 11 plays, 75 yards, 5:48; Michigan 14–0)
- (0:24) MICH – Roman Wilson 13-yard pass from J.J. McCarthy, James Turner kick (Drive: 10 plays, 83 yards, 4:06; Michigan 21–0)

Third quarter

- (10:31) MICH – Roman Wilson 47-yard pass from J.J. McCarthy, James Turner kick (Drive: 3 plays, 64 yards, 1:23; Michigan 28–0)
- (3:16) MICH – Blake Corum 5-yard run, James Turner kick (Drive: 4 plays, 76 yards, 2:12; Michigan 35–0)

Fourth quarter

- (2:43) UNLV – Jordan Younge-Humphrey 20-yard run, Jose Pizano kick (Drive: 9 plays, 81 yards, 5:34; Michigan 35–7)

| Statistics | UNLV | MICH |
|---|---|---|
| First downs | 15 | 23 |
| Total yards | 229 | 492 |
| Rushing yards | 31–61 | 33–179 |
| Passing yards | 168 | 313 |
| Passing: Comp–Att–Int | 15–26–0 | 23–28–1 |
| Time of possession | 28:54 | 31:06 |

| Team | Category | Player | Statistics |
|---|---|---|---|
| UNLV | Passing | Doug Brumfield | 10/19, 100 yards |
| UNLV | Rushing | Vincent Davis | 6 carries, 28 yards |
| UNLV | Receiving | Jacob De Jesus | 5 receptions, 46 yards |
| Michigan | Passing | J.J. McCarthy | 22/25, 278 yards, 2 TD |
| Michigan | Rushing | Blake Corum | 15 carries, 80 yards, 3 TD |
| Michigan | Receiving | Roman Wilson | 4 receptions, 89 yards, 2 TD |

=== vs Vanderbilt ===
Game Three: Vanderbilt Commodores (2–1) vs UNLV Rebels (1–1) – Game summary

| Quarter | 1 | 2 | 3 | 4 | Total |
|---|---|---|---|---|---|
| Vanderbilt | 10 | 7 | 0 | 20 | 37 |
| UNLV | 0 | 20 | 10 | 10 | 40 |

at Allegiant Stadium • Paradise, NV

- Date: September 16, 2023
- Game time: 4:00 p.m.
- Game weather: None (Indoor stadium)
- Game attendance: 22,582
- Referee: Matt Loeffler
- TV announcers (CBS Sports Network): Chris Lewis, Ross Tucker, Justin Walters

Game information

First quarter

- (8:52) VAN – Martel Hight 37-yard interception return, Jacob Borcila kick (Vanderbilt 7–0)
- (1:14) VAN – Jacob Borcila 30-yard field goal (Drive: 11 plays, 48 yards, 6:01; Vanderbilt 10–0)

Second quarter

- (13:51) VAN – London Humphreys 56-yard pass from AJ Swann, Jacob Borcila kick (Drive: 4 plays, 68 yards, 1:24; Vanderbilt 17–0)
- (12:17) UNLV – Jai'Den Thomas 21-yard run, Jose Pizano kick (Drive: 4 plays, 61 yards, 1:27; Vanderbilt 17–7)
- (10:48) UNLV – Jose Pizano 27-yard field goal (Drive: 4 plays, 5 yards, 0:24; Vanderbilt 17–10)
- (9:38) UNLV – Jerrae Williams 41-yard fumble return, Jose Pizano kick (Tied 17–17)
- (0:03) UNLV – Jose Pizano 31-yard field goal (Drive: 3 plays, 15 yards, 0:16; UNLV 20–17)

Third quarter

- (10:14) UNLV – Jose Pizano 34-yard field goal (Drive: 13 plays, 59 yards, 4:46; UNLV 23–17)
- (2:00) UNLV – Jayden Maiava 24-yard run, Jose Pizano kick (Drive: 8 plays, 56 yards, 3:19; UNLV 30–17)

Fourth quarter

- (13:35) VAN – Justin Ball 3-yard pass from AJ Swann, Jacob Borcila kick (Drive: 8 plays, 64 yards, 2:45; UNLV 30–24)
- (9:16) VAN – Jacob Borcila 32-yard field goal (Drive: 8 plays, 56 yards, 3:07; UNLV 30–27)
- (4:47) VAN – Jacob Borcila 44-yard field goal (Drive: 5 plays, 33 yards, 1:13; Tied 30–30)
- (2:23) UNLV – Jacob De Jesus 48-yard pass from Jayden Maiava, Jose Pizano kick (Drive: 6 plays, 75 yards, 2:24; UNLV 37–30)
- (1:12) VAN – Quincy Skinner Jr. 34-yard pass from AJ Swann, Jacob Borcila kick (Drive: 5 plays, 75 yards, 1:11; Tied 37–37)
- (0:05) UNLV – Jose Pizano 36-yard field goal (Drive: 5 plays, 62 yards, 0:39; UNLV 40–37)

| Statistics | VAN | UNLV |
|---|---|---|
| First downs | 21 | 21 |
| Total yards | 420 | 403 |
| Rushing yards | 38–83 | 40–127 |
| Passing yards | 337 | 276 |
| Passing: Comp–Att–Int | 18–37–1 | 21–37–2 |
| Time of possession | 30:45 | 28:35 |

| Team | Category | Player | Statistics |
|---|---|---|---|
| Vanderbilt | Passing | AJ Swann | 17/35, 335 yards, 3 TD, INT |
| Vanderbilt | Rushing | Patrick Smith | 13 carries, 43 yards |
| Vanderbilt | Receiving | London Humphreys | 3 receptions, 102 yards, TD |
| UNLV | Passing | Jayden Maiava | 19/33, 261 yards, TD, INT |
| UNLV | Rushing | Jai'Den Thomas | 13 carries, 50 yards, TD |
| UNLV | Receiving | Ricky White | 12 receptions, 165 yards |

=== at UTEP ===
UNLV Rebels (2–1) at UTEP Miners (1–4) – Game summary

| Quarter | 1 | 2 | 3 | 4 | Total |
|---|---|---|---|---|---|
| Rebels | 14 | 14 | 0 | 17 | 45 |
| Miners | 7 | 7 | 7 | 7 | 28 |

at Sun Bowl • El Paso, TX

- Date: September 23, 2023
- Game time: 7:00 p.m. MST
- Game weather: Sunny, 92 °F (33 °C)
- Game attendance: 28,042
- Referee: Ron Hudson
- TV announcers (ESPN+): Duke Keith, Jacob Boggs

Game information

First quarter

- (9:27) UNLV – Jai'Den Thomas 12-yard run, Jose Pizano kick (Drive: 1 play, 12 yards, 0:07; UNLV 7–0)
- (3:20) UTEP – Gavin Hardison 1-yard run, Buzz Flabiano kick (Drive: 10 plays, 75 yards, 6:07; Tied 7–7)
- (2:14) UNLV – Jai'Den Thomas 17-yard run, Jose Pizano kick (Drive: 3 plays, 75 yards, 1:06; UNLV 14–7)

Second quarter

- (5:11) UTEP – Gavin Hardison 1-yard run, Buzz Flabiano kick (Drive: 10 plays, 57 yards, 5:35; Tied 14–14)
- (3:18) UNLV – Lester Donavyn 1-yard run, Jose Pizano kick (Drive: 5 plays, 75 yards, 1:53; UNLV 21–14)
- (1:01) UNLV – Jai'Den Thomas 5-yard run, Jose Pizano kick (Drive: 6 plays, 32 yards, 1:17; UNLV 28–14)

Third quarter

- (11:12) UTEP – Torrance Burgess Jr. 11-yard run, Buzz Flabiano kick (Drive: 7 plays, 75 yards, 3:48; UNLV 28–21)

Fourth quarter

- (14:30) UNLV – Jai'Den Thomas 1-yard run, Jose Pizano kick (Drive: 6 plays, 77 yards, 1:47; UNLV 35–21)
- (5:28) UTEP – Jeremiah Ballard 27-yard pass from Gavin Hardison, Buzz Flabiano kick (Drive: 6 plays, 77 yards, 3:16; UNLV 35–28)
- (7:39) UNLV – Courtney Reese 32-yard run, Jose Pizano kick (Drive: 9 plays, 66 yards, 3:22; UNLV 42–28)
- (1:56) UNLV – Jose Pizano 30-yard field goal (Drive: 5 plays, 23 yards, 2:24; UNLV 45–28)

| Statistics | UNLV | UTEP |
|---|---|---|
| First downs | 23 | 21 |
| Total yards | 497 | 316 |
| Rushing yards | 48–307 | 34–91 |
| Passing yards | 190 | 225 |
| Passing: Comp–Att–Int | 15–27–1 | 14–31–3 |
| Time of possession | 29:51 | 30:09 |

| Team | Category | Player | Statistics |
|---|---|---|---|
| UNLV | Passing | Jayden Maiava | 15/27, 190 yards, INT |
| UNLV | Rushing | Jai'Den Thomas | 13 carries, 100 yards, 4 TD |
| UNLV | Receiving | Ricky White | 2 receptions, 62 yards |
| UTEP | Passing | Gavin Hardison | 14/31, 225 yards, TD, 3 INT |
| UTEP | Rushing | Torrance Burgess Jr. | 19 carries, 99 yards, TD |
| UTEP | Receiving | Kelly Akharaiyi | 4 receptions, 92 yards |

=== vs Hawaii ===
Hawaii Rainbow Warriors (1–3) vs UNLV Rebels (3–1) – Game summary

| Quarter | 1 | 2 | 3 | 4 | Total |
|---|---|---|---|---|---|
| Rainbow Warriors | 0 | 3 | 10 | 7 | 20 |
| Rebels | 7 | 13 | 7 | 17 | 44 |

at Allegiant Stadium • Paradise, NV

- Date: September 30, 2023
- Game time: 1:00 p.m.
- Game weather: None (Indoor stadium)
- Game attendance: 25,328
- Referee: Jonathan Noli
- TV announcers (KVVU): Steve Cofield, Matt Neverett

Game information

First quarter

- (9:04) UNLV – Vincent Davis 16-yard pass from Jayden Maiava, Jose Pizano kick (Drive: 5 plays, 66 yards, 2:29; UNLV 7–0)

Second quarter

- (13:27) UNLV – Jose Pizano 52-yard field goal (Drive: 5 plays, 28 yards, 1:27; UNLV 10–0)
- (12:00) HAW – Matthew Shipley 33-yard field goal (Drive: 6 plays, 59 yards, 1:27; UNLV 10–3)
- (4:56) UNLV – Jose Pizano 27-yard field goal (Drive: 13 plays, 66 yards, 7:04; UNLV 13–3)
- (0:45) UNLV – Courtney Reese 4-yard run, Jose Pizano kick (Drive: 4 plays, 30 yards, 4:11; UNLV 20–3)

Third quarter

- (11:45) HAW – Steven McBride 51-yard pass from Brayden Schager, Matthew Shipley kick (Drive: 1 play, 51 yards, 0:08; UNLV 20–10)
- (8:17) UNLV – Courtney Reese 21-yard run, Jose Pizano kick (Drive: 8 plays, 75 yards, 3:28; UNLV 27–10)
- (5:07) HAW – Matthew Shipley 34-yard field goal (Drive: 6 plays, 64 yards, 3:04; UNLV 27–13)

Fourth quarter

- (14:29) UNLV – Jose Pizano 48-yard field goal (Drive: 11 plays, 45 yards, 5:38; UNLV 30–13)
- (12:47) HAW – Alex Perry 38-yard pass from Brayden Schager, Matthew Shipley kick (Drive: 4 plays, 80 yards, 1:35; UNLV 30–20)
- (8:18) UNLV – Jacob De Jesus 3-yard pass from Jayden Maiava, Jose Pizano kick (Drive: 10 plays, 80 yards, 4:25; UNLV 37–20)
- (5:37) UNLV – Donavyn Lester 22-yard run, Jose Pizano kick (Drive: 2 plays, 50 yards, 0:20; UNLV 44–20)

| Statistics | HAW | UNLV |
|---|---|---|
| First downs | 20 | 27 |
| Total yards | 359 | 449 |
| Rushing yards | 26–46 | 47–307 |
| Passing yards | 313 | 142 |
| Passing: Comp–Att–Int | 22–35–1 | 11–21–0 |
| Time of possession | 25:45 | 34:15 |

| Team | Category | Player | Statistics |
|---|---|---|---|
| Hawaii | Passing | Brayden Schager | 22/35, 313 yards, 2 TD, INT |
| Hawaii | Rushing | Tylan Hines | 9 carries, 43 yards |
| Hawaii | Receiving | Steven McBride | 6 receptions, 180 yards, TD |
| UNLV | Passing | Jayden Maiava | 11/21, 142 yards, 2 TD |
| UNLV | Rushing | Donavyn Lester | 12 carries, 98 yards, TD |
| UNLV | Receiving | Ricky White | 5 receptions, 56 yards |

=== at Nevada ===
UNLV Rebels (4–1) at Nevada Wolf Pack (0–5) – Game summary

| Quarter | 1 | 2 | 3 | 4 | Total |
|---|---|---|---|---|---|
| Rebels | 14 | 14 | 10 | 7 | 45 |
| Wolf Pack | 7 | 0 | 7 | 13 | 27 |

at Mackay Stadium • Reno, NV

- Date: October 14, 2023
- Game time: 7:00 p.m.
- Game weather: Sunny, 70 °F (21 °C)
- Game attendance: 24,578
- Referee: Michael Cuttone
- TV announcers (KVVU): Steve Cofield, Matt Neverett

Game information

First quarter

- (12:40) UNLV – Ricky White 59-yard pass from Jayden Maiava, Jose Pizano kick (Drive: 2 plays, 69 yards, 0:18; UNLV 7–0)
- (5:47) UNLV – Donavyn Lester 1-yard run, Jose Pizano kick (Drive: 9 plays, 79 yards, 4:10; UNLV 14–0)
- (3:01) NEV – Dalevon Campbell 43-yard pass from Brendon Lewis, Brandon Talton kick (Drive: 6 plays, 78 yards, 2:41; UNLV 14–7)

Second quarter

- (13:21) UNLV – Donavyn Lester 16-yard run, Jose Pizano kick (Drive: 3 plays, 23 yards, 1:14; UNLV 21–7)
- (5:38) UNLV – Ricky White 82-yard pass from Jayden Maiava, Jose Pizano kick (Drive: 6 plays, 92 yards, 3:03; UNLV 28–7)

Third quarter

- (14:00) UNLV – Donavyn Lester 66-yard run, Jose Pizano kick (Drive: 3 plays, 75 yards, 1:00; UNLV 35–7)
- (11:15) NEV – Brendon Lewis 6-yard run, Brandon Talton kick (Drive: 7 plays, 79 yards, 2:40; UNLV 35–14)
- (1:43) UNLV – Jose Pizano 25-yard field goal (Drive: 9 plays, 28 yards, 4:41; UNLV 38–14)

Fourth quarter

- (11:15) NEV – Sean Dollars 2-yard run, kick failed (Drive: 12 plays, 75 yards, 4:25; UNLV 38–20)
- (3:37) UNLV – Vincent Davis 9-yard run, Jose Pizano kick (Drive: 4 plays, 20 yards, 2:08; UNLV 45–20)
- (1:51) NEV – Isaah Crocker 55-yard pass from Brendon Lewis, Brandon Talton kick (Drive: 5 plays, 75 yards, 1:46; UNLV 45–27)

| Statistics | UNLV | NEV |
|---|---|---|
| First downs | 22 | 19 |
| Total yards | 518 | 474 |
| Rushing yards | 48–259 | 37–187 |
| Passing yards | 259 | 287 |
| Passing: Comp–Att–Int | 19–24–0 | 16–31–2 |
| Time of possession | 32:41 | 27:17 |

| Team | Category | Player | Statistics |
|---|---|---|---|
| UNLV | Passing | Jayden Maiava | 19/24, 259 yards, 2 TD |
| UNLV | Rushing | Donavyn Lester | 10 carries, 99 yards, 3 TD |
| UNLV | Receiving | Ricky White | 7 receptions, 166 yards, 2 TD |
| Nevada | Passing | Brendon Lewis | 16/31, 287 yards, 2 TD, 2 INT |
| Nevada | Rushing | Brendon Lewis | 15 carries, 115 yards, TD |
| Nevada | Receiving | Dalevon Campbell | 3 receptions, 93 yards, TD |

=== vs Colorado State ===
Colorado State Rams (2–4) vs UNLV Rebels (5–1) – Game summary

| Quarter | 1 | 2 | 3 | 4 | Total |
|---|---|---|---|---|---|
| Rams | 0 | 13 | 0 | 10 | 23 |
| Rebels | 0 | 3 | 13 | 9 | 25 |

at Allegiant Stadium • Paradise, NV

- Date: October 21, 2023
- Game time: 4:00 p.m.
- Game weather: None (Indoor stadium)
- Game attendance: 22,585
- Referee: Nolan Dumas
- TV announcers (KVVU): Steve Cofield, Matt Neverett

Game information

First quarter

None

Second quarter

- (14:15) UNLV – Jose Pizano 42-yard field goal (Drive: 9 plays, 26 yards, 3:58; UNLV 3–0)
- (7:39) CSU – Jordan Noyes 33-yard field goal (Drive: 15 plays, 59 yards, 6:31; Tied 3–3)
- (3:58) CSU – Avery Morrow 2-yard run, Jordan Noyes kick (Drive: 7 plays, 73 yards, 2:29; Colorado State 10–3)
- (0:53) CSU – Jordan Noyes 27-yard field goal (Drive: 9 plays, 70 yards, 1:43; Colorado State 13–3)

Third quarter

- (6:05) UNLV – Jose Pizano 43-yard field goal (Drive: 12 plays, 36 yards, 3:43; Colorado State 13–6)
- (3:06) UNLV – Jose Pizano 25-yard field goal (Drive: 7 plays, 19 yards, 3:01; Colorado State 13–9)
- (3:58) UNLV – Donavyn Lester 11-yard run, Jose Pizano kick (Drive: 6 plays, 66 yards, 2:15; UNLV 16–13)

Fourth quarter

- (7:36) UNLV – Jose Pizano 34-yard field goal (Drive: 16 plays, 78 yards, 7:40; UNLV 19–13)
- (3:49) CSU – Justus Ross-Simmons 20-yard pass from Brayden Fowler-Nicolosi, Jordan Noyes kick (Drive: 5 plays, 75 yards, 1:46; Colorado State 20–19)
- (1:27) UNLV – Jose Pizano 46-yard field goal (Drive: 7 plays, 46 yards, 2:17; UNLV 22–20)
- (0:44) CSU – Jordan Noyes 55-yard field goal (Drive: 7 plays, 37 yards, 0:43; Colorado State 23–22)
- (0:00) UNLV – Jose Pizano 28-yard field goal (Drive: 6 plays, 56 yards, 0:40; UNLV 25–23)

| Statistics | CSU | UNLV |
|---|---|---|
| First downs | 19 | 25 |
| Total yards | 372 | 491 |
| Rushing yards | 31–137 | 46–138 |
| Passing yards | 235 | 353 |
| Passing: Comp–Att–Int | 21–33–1 | 27–36–0 |
| Time of possession | 26:05 | 33:55 |

| Team | Category | Player | Statistics |
|---|---|---|---|
| Colorado State | Passing | Brayden Fowler-Nicolosi | 21/32, 235 yards, TD |
| Colorado State | Rushing | Vann Schield | 11 carries, 90 yards |
| Colorado State | Receiving | Dallin Holker | 4 receptions, 80 yards |
| UNLV | Passing | Jayden Maiava | 27/36, 353 yards |
| UNLV | Rushing | Vincent Davis | 17 carries, 63 yards, 2 TD |
| UNLV | Receiving | Jacob De Jesus | 9 receptions, 120 yards |

=== at Fresno State ===
UNLV Rebels (6–1) at Fresno State Bulldogs (5–1) – Game summary

| Quarter | 1 | 2 | 3 | 4 | Total |
|---|---|---|---|---|---|
| Rebels | 7 | 10 | 0 | 7 | 24 |
| Bulldogs | 7 | 0 | 24 | 0 | 31 |

at Valley Children's Stadium • Fresno, CA

- Date: October 28, 2023
- Game time: 7:30 p.m. MST
- Game weather: Clear, 58 °F (14 °C)
- Game attendance: 41,031
- Referee: Jonathan Noli
- TV announcers (FS1): Alex Faust, Petros Papadakis

Game information

First quarter

- (7:41) FRES – Tim Grear Jr. 31-yard pass from Mikey Keene, Dylan Lynch kick (Drive: 11 plays, 81 yards, 4:58; Fresno State 7–0)
- (2:20) UNLV – Ricky White 41-yard pass from Jayden Maiava, Jose Pizano kick (Drive: 10 plays, 80 yards, 5:19; Tied 7–7)

Second quarter

- (11:51) UNLV – Jose Pizano 30-yard field goal (Drive: 7 plays, 23 yards, 2:08; UNLV 10–7)
- (0:33) UNLV – Jai'Den Thomas 4-yard run, Jose Pizano kick (Drive: 9 plays, 72 yards, 1:16; UNLV 17–7)

Third quarter

- (10:38) FRES – Mac Dalena 2-yard pass from Mikey Keene, Dylan Lynch kick (Drive: 5 plays, 15 yards, 2:34; UNLV 17–14)
- (5:59) FRES – Erik Brooks 10-yard pass from Mikey Keene, Dylan Lynch kick (Drive: 7 plays, 80 yards, 2:54; Fresno State 21–17)
- (2:23) FRES – Dylan Lynch 36-yard field goal (Drive: 5 plays, 23 yards, 1:58; Fresno State 24–17)
- (0:03) FRES – Malik Sherrod 3-yard pass from Mikey Keene, Dylan Lynch kick (Drive: 7 plays, 31 yards, 2:11; Fresno State 31–17)

Fourth quarter

- (12:22) UNLV – Ricky White 15-yard pass from Jayden Maiava, Jose Pizano kick (Drive: 7 plays, 70 yards, 2:38; Fresno State 31–24)

| Statistics | UNLV | FRES |
|---|---|---|
| First downs | 22 | 15 |
| Total yards | 424 | 312 |
| Rushing yards | 43–156 | 20–56 |
| Passing yards | 268 | 256 |
| Passing: Comp–Att–Int | 21–35–2 | 27–41–2 |
| Time of possession | 31:14 | 28:46 |

| Team | Category | Player | Statistics |
|---|---|---|---|
| UNLV | Passing | Jayden Maiava | 21/35, 268 yards, 2 TD, 2 INT |
| UNLV | Rushing | Vincent Davis | 12 carries, 68 yards |
| UNLV | Receiving | Ricky White | 7 receptions, 152 yards, 2 TD |
| Fresno State | Passing | Mikey Keene | 27/41, 256 yards, 4 TD, 2 INT |
| Fresno State | Rushing | Malik Sherrod | 17 carries, 56 yards |
| Fresno State | Receiving | Jalen Moss | 5 receptions, 99 yards |

=== at New Mexico ===
UNLV Rebels (6–2) at New Mexico Lobos (3–5) – Game summary

| Quarter | 1 | 2 | 3 | 4 | Total |
|---|---|---|---|---|---|
| Rebels | 14 | 21 | 14 | 7 | 56 |
| Lobos | 0 | 7 | 0 | 7 | 14 |

at University Stadium • Albuquerque, NM

- Date: November 4, 2023
- Game time: 4:00 p.m. MST
- Game weather: Clear, 74 °F (23 °C)
- Game attendance: 12,353
- Referee: Michael Cuttone
- TV announcers (KVVU): Steve Cofield, Matt Neverett

Game information

First quarter

- (12:15) UNLV – Ricky White 30-yard pass from Jayden Maiava, Jose Pizano kick (Drive: 1 play, 30 yards, 0:07; UNLV 7–0)
- (5:44) UNLV – Vincent Davis 5-yard run, Jose Pizano kick (Drive: 5 plays, 32 yards, 1:53; UNLV 14–0)

Second quarter

- (14:15) UNM – Andrew Henry 3-yard run, Luke Drzewiecki kick (Drive: 12 plays, 75 yards, 6:29; UNLV 14–7)
- (9:00) UNLV – Vincent Davis 5-yard run, Jose Pizano kick (Drive: 10 plays, 75 yards, 5:15; UNLV 21–7)
- (6:56) UNLV – Donavyn Lester 5-yard run, Jose Pizano kick (Drive: 1 play, 5 yards, 0:06; UNLV 28–7)
- (4:22) UNLV – Courtney Reese 2-yard run, Jose Pizano kick (Drive: 3 plays, 21 yards, 1:20; UNLV 35–7)

Third quarter

- (11:41) UNLV – Dominic Gicinto 43-yard pass from Jayden Maiava, Jose Pizano kick (Drive: 9 plays, 75 yards, 5:15; UNLV 42–7)
- (9:17) UNLV – Ricky White 58-yard pass from Jayden Maiava, Jose Pizano kick (Drive: 1 play, 58 yards, 0:08; UNLV 49–7)

Fourth quarter

- (10:31) UNLV – Cameron Friel 1-yard run, Andre Meono kick (Drive: 4 plays, 9 yards, 2:01; UNLV 56–7)
- (3:05) UNM – Jacory Croskey-Merritt 1-yard pass from Devon Dampier, Luke Drzewiecki kick (Drive: 14 plays, 75 yards, 7:26; UNLV 56–14)

| Statistics | UNLV | UNM |
|---|---|---|
| First downs | 17 | 20 |
| Total yards | 416 | 362 |
| Rushing yards | 32–169 | 45–166 |
| Passing yards | 247 | 196 |
| Passing: Comp–Att–Int | 13–18–0 | 17–26–0 |
| Time of possession | 22:42 | 37:18 |

| Team | Category | Player | Statistics |
|---|---|---|---|
| UNLV | Passing | Jayden Maiava | 13/18, 247 yards, 3 TD |
| UNLV | Rushing | Vincent Davis | 9 carries, 64 yards, 2 TD |
| UNLV | Receiving | Ricky White | 8 receptions, 165 yards, 2 TD |
| New Mexico | Passing | Dylan Hopkins | 15/23, 187 yards |
| New Mexico | Rushing | Jacory Croskey-Merritt | 21 carries, 86 yards |
| New Mexico | Receiving | DJ Washington | 5 receptions, 78 yards |

=== vs Wyoming ===
Wyoming Cowboys (6–3) vs UNLV Rebels (7–2) – Game summary

| Quarter | 1 | 2 | 3 | 4 | Total |
|---|---|---|---|---|---|
| Cowboys | 0 | 14 | 0 | 0 | 14 |
| Rebels | 21 | 0 | 7 | 6 | 34 |

at Allegiant Stadium • Paradise, NV

- Date: November 10, 2023
- Game time: 4:00 p.m.
- Game weather: None (Indoor stadium)
- Game attendance: 25,568
- Referee: Jonathan Noli
- TV announcers (FS1): Alex Faust, Petros Papadakis

Game information

First quarter

- (12:52) UNLV – Jayden Maiava 10-yard run, Jose Pizano kick (Drive: 3 plays, 70 yards, 0:21; UNLV 7–0)
- (8:47) UNLV – Jayden Maiava 1-yard run, Jose Pizano kick (Drive: 7 plays, 29 yards, 2:55; UNLV 14–0)
- (4:22) UNLV – Jai'Den Thomas 7-yard run, Jose Pizano kick (Drive: 7 plays, 67 yards, 3:14; UNLV 21–0)

Second quarter

- (14:09) WYO – Andrew Peasley 32-yard run, John Hoyland kick (Drive: 3 plays, 53 yards, 1:47; UNLV 21–7)
- (2:58) WYO – Wyatt Wieland 1-yard run, John Hoyland kick (Drive: 11 plays, 51 yards, 6:07; UNLV 21–14)

Third quarter

- (2:46) UNLV – Kaleo Ballungay 5-yard pass from Jayden Maiava, Jose Pizano kick (Drive: 13 plays, 70 yards, 6:18; UNLV 28–14)

Fourth quarter

- (7:41) UNLV – Jose Pizano 39-yard field goal (Drive: 12 plays, 45 yards, 6:25; UNLV 31–14)
- (0:47) UNLV – Jose Pizano 43-yard field goal (Drive: 10 plays, 28 yards, 5:50; UNLV 34–14)

| Statistics | WYO | UNLV |
|---|---|---|
| First downs | 16 | 19 |
| Total yards | 297 | 397 |
| Rushing yards | 33–121 | 46–165 |
| Passing yards | 176 | 232 |
| Passing: Comp–Att–Int | 15–28–1 | 17–24–0 |
| Time of possession | 26:30 | 33:30 |

| Team | Category | Player | Statistics |
|---|---|---|---|
| Wyoming | Passing | Andrew Peasley | 11/22, 144 yards, INT |
| Wyoming | Rushing | Andrew Peasley | 14 carries, 69 yards, TD |
| Wyoming | Receiving | Wyatt Wieland | 5 receptions, 72 yards |
| UNLV | Passing | Jayden Maiava | 17/24, 232 yards, TD |
| UNLV | Rushing | Jayden Maiava | 11 carries, 40 yards, 2 TD |
| UNLV | Receiving | Ricky White | 8 receptions, 144 yards |

=== at Air Force ===
UNLV Rebels (8–2) at Air Force Falcons (8–2) – Game summary

| Quarter | 1 | 2 | 3 | 4 | Total |
|---|---|---|---|---|---|
| Rebels | 7 | 7 | 14 | 3 | 31 |
| Falcons | 7 | 20 | 0 | 0 | 27 |

at Falcon Stadium • Colorado Springs, CO

- Date: November 18, 2023
- Game time: 4:00 p.m. MST
- Game weather: Clear, 74 °F (23 °C)
- Game attendance: 23,574
- Referee: Christian Watson
- TV announcers (CBS Sports Network): Carter Blackburn, Randy Cross

Game information

First quarter

- (12:48) UNLV – Ricky White 78-yard pass from Jayden Maiava, Jose Pizano kick (Drive: 2 plays, 79 yards, 0:34; UNLV 7–0)
- (0:26) AF – John Lee Eldridge III 55-yard run, Matthew Dapore kick (Drive: 7 plays, 94 yards, 3:25; Tied 7–7)

Second quarter

- (11:37) AF – Jensen Jones 1-yard run, Matthew Dapore kick (Drive: 6 plays, 74 yards, 2:26; Air Force 14–7)
- (7:03) AF – Matthew Dapore 27-yard field goal (Drive: 6 plays, 62 yards, 3:03; Air Force 17–7)
- (5:36) AF – Jensen Jones 1-yard run, Matthew Dapore kick (Drive: 3 plays, 11 yards, 0:58; Air Force 24–7)
- (1:41) UNLV – Vincent Davis 12-yard run, Jose Pizano kick (Drive: 8 plays, 75 yards, 3:55; Air Force 24–14)
- (0:00) AF – Matthew Dapore 42-yard field goal (Drive: 6 plays, 50 yards, 1:41; Air Force 27–14)

Third quarter

- (14:04) UNLV – Donavyn Lester 1-yard run, Jose Pizano kick (Drive: 3 plays, 85 yards, 0:52; Air Force 27–21)
- (2:55) UNLV – Kaleo Ballungay 6-yard pass from Jayden Maiava, Jose Pizano kick (Drive: 10 plays, 70 yards, 4:35; UNLV 28–27)

Fourth quarter

- (10:53) UNLV – Jose Pizano 39-yard field goal (Drive: 11 plays, 45 yards, 5:10; UNLV 31–27)

| Statistics | UNLV | AF |
|---|---|---|
| First downs | 15 | 22 |
| Total yards | 465 | 404 |
| Rushing yards | 33–114 | 62–344 |
| Passing yards | 351 | 60 |
| Passing: Comp–Att–Int | 16–30–2 | 3–9–0 |
| Time of possession | 26:26 | 33:34 |

| Team | Category | Player | Statistics |
|---|---|---|---|
| UNLV | Passing | Jayden Maiava | 15/29, 339 yards, 2 TD, 2 INT |
| UNLV | Rushing | Jayden Maiava | 8 carries, 36 yards |
| UNLV | Receiving | Ricky White | 8 receptions, 169 yards, TD |
| Air Force | Passing | Jensen Jones | 1/6, 35 yards |
| Air Force | Rushing | Dylan Carson | 16 carries, 104 yards |
| Air Force | Receiving | Caleb Rillos | 1 reception, 35 yards |

=== vs San Jose State ===
San Jose State Spartans (6–5) vs UNLV Rebels (9–2) – Game summary

| Quarter | 1 | 2 | 3 | 4 | Total |
|---|---|---|---|---|---|
| Spartans | 17 | 3 | 10 | 7 | 37 |
| Rebels | 7 | 3 | 7 | 14 | 31 |

at Allegiant Stadium • Paradise, NV

- Date: November 25, 2023
- Game time: 4:00 p.m.
- Game weather: None (Indoor stadium)
- Game attendance: 25,554
- Referee: Nolan Dumas
- TV announcers (KVVU): Steve Cofield, Matt Neverett

Game information

First quarter

- (12:49) SJSU – Sam Olson 56-yard pass from Chevan Cordeiro, Kyler Halvorsen kick (Drive: 4 plays, 75 yards, 2:11; San Jose State 7–0)
- (9:57) SJSU – Kyler Halvorsen 25-yard field goal (Drive: 7 plays, 19 yards, 2:55; San Jose State 10–0)
- (4:37) SJSU – Kairee Robinson 25-yard run, Kyler Halvorsen kick (Drive: 8 plays, 80 yards, 4:06; San Jose State 17–0)
- (2:08) UNLV – Jai'Den Thomas 7-yard run, Jose Pizano kick (Drive: 6 plays, 70 yards, 2:29; San Jose State 17–7)

Second quarter

- (10:59) SJSU – Kyler Halvorsen 30-yard field goal (Drive: 11 plays, 62 yards, 6:04; San Jose State 20–7)
- (3:33) UNLV – Jose Pizano 34-yard field goal (Drive: 5 plays, 65 yards, 1:57; San Jose State 20–10)

Third quarter

- (13:10) UNLV – Jai'Den Thomas 3-yard run, Jose Pizano kick (Drive: 4 plays, 75 yards, 1:50; San Jose State 20–17)
- (9:43) SJSU – Isaac Jernagin 3-yard pass from Chevan Cordeiro, Kyler Halvorsen kick (Drive: 6 plays, 75 yards, 3:27; San Jose State 27–17)
- (4:49) SJSU – Kyler Halvorsen 22-yard field goal (Drive: 9 plays, 59 yards, 4:26; San Jose State 30–17)

Fourth quarter

- (11:27) SJSU – Kairee Robinson 40-yard run, Kyler Halvorsen kick (Drive: 7 plays, 70 yards, 4:18; San Jose State 37–17)
- (6:19) UNLV – Jai'Den Thomas 2-yard run, Jose Pizano kick (Drive: 13 plays, 70 yards, 5:03; San Jose State 37–24)
- (1:27) UNLV – Corey Thompson Jr. 29-yard pass from Jayden Maiava, Jose Pizano kick (Drive: 8 plays, 90 yards, 2:24; San Jose State 37–31)

| Statistics | SJSU | UNLV |
|---|---|---|
| First downs | 21 | 22 |
| Total yards | 482 | 411 |
| Rushing yards | 40–233 | 32–182 |
| Passing yards | 249 | 229 |
| Passing: Comp–Att–Int | 19–26–0 | 19–29–0 |
| Time of possession | 36:40 | 23:20 |

| Team | Category | Player | Statistics |
|---|---|---|---|
| San Jose State | Passing | Chevan Cordeiro | 19/26, 249 yards, 2 TD |
| San Jose State | Rushing | Kairee Robinson | 17 carries, 168 yards, 2 TD |
| San Jose State | Receiving | Nick Nash | 3 receptions, 98 yards |
| UNLV | Passing | Jayden Maiava | 19/29, 229 yards, TD |
| UNLV | Rushing | Vincent Davis | 9 carries, 88 yards |
| UNLV | Receiving | Ricky White | 5 receptions, 111 yards |

=== vs Boise State—Mountain West Championship Game ===
Boise State Broncos (7–5) vs UNLV Rebels (9–3) – Game summary

| Quarter | 1 | 2 | 3 | 4 | Total |
|---|---|---|---|---|---|
| Broncos | 14 | 17 | 10 | 3 | 44 |
| Rebels | 7 | 10 | 3 | 0 | 20 |

at Allegiant Stadium • Paradise, NV

- Date: December 2, 2023
- Game time: 4:00 p.m.
- Game weather: None (Indoor stadium)
- Game attendance: 31,473
- Referee: Jonathan Noli
- TV announcers (Fox): Jason Benetti, Brock Huard, Allison Williams

Game information

First quarter

- (11:08) BSU – Taylen Green 8-yard run, Jonah Dalmas kick (Drive: 7 plays, 75 yards, 3:52; Boise State 7–0)
- (6:45) UNLV – Vincent Davis 5-yard run, Jose Pizano kick (Drive: 12 plays, 87 yards, 4:18; Tied 7–7)
- (2:21) BSU – Ashton Jeanty 5-yard run, Jonah Dalmas kick (Drive: 8 plays, 75 yards, 4:24; Boise State 14–7)

Second quarter

- (14:49) UNLV – Fred Thompkins 47-yard interception return, Jose Pizano kick (Tied 14–14)
- (13:32) BSU – Austin Bolt 57-yard pass from Taylen Green, Jonah Dalmas kick (Drive: 3 plays, 75 yards, 1:17; Boise State 21–14)
- (12:10) BSU – Taylen Green 70-yard run, Jonah Dalmas kick (Drive: 1 play, 70 yards, 0:12; Boise State 28–14)
- (7:23) BSU – Jonah Dalmas 31-yard field goal (Drive: 7 plays, 16 yards, 3:31; Boise State 31–14)
- (3:35) UNLV – Jose Pizano 51-yard field goal (Drive: 9 plays, 42 yards, 3:48; Boise State 31–17)

Third quarter

- (11:07) UNLV – Jose Pizano 46-yard field goal (Drive: 12 plays, 45 yards, 3:47; Boise State 31–20)
- (5:03) BSU – Jonah Dalmas 50-yard field goal (Drive: 10 plays, 41 yards, 6:04; Boise State 34–20)
- (0:16) BSU – Matt Lauter 16-yard pass from Taylen Green, Jonah Dalmas kick (Drive: 6 plays, 59 yards, 3:01; Boise State 41–20)

Fourth quarter

- (3:43) BSU – Jonah Dalmas 22-yard field goal (Drive: 7 plays, 79 yards, 4:12; Boise State 44–20)

| Statistics | BSU | UNLV |
|---|---|---|
| First downs | 23 | 16 |
| Total yards | 527 | 298 |
| Rushing yards | 51–301 | 28–81 |
| Passing yards | 226 | 217 |
| Passing: Comp–Att–Int | 12–15–1 | 18–38–2 |
| Time of possession | 37:10 | 22:50 |

| Team | Category | Player | Statistics |
|---|---|---|---|
| Boise State | Passing | Taylen Green | 12/15, 226 yards, 2 TD, INT |
| Boise State | Rushing | Ashton Jeanty | 21 carries, 153 yards, TD |
| Boise State | Receiving | Billy Bowens | 4 receptions, 91 yards |
| UNLV | Passing | Jayden Maiava | 15/29, 166 yards, 2 INT |
| UNLV | Rushing | Vincent Davis | 14 carries, 55 yards, TD |
| UNLV | Receiving | Ricky White | 6 receptions, 86 yards |

=== vs Kansas—Guaranteed Rate Bowl ===
Kansas Jayhawks (7–5) vs UNLV Rebels (9–3) – Game summary
(2023 Guaranteed Rate Bowl)

| Quarter | 1 | 2 | 3 | 4 | Total |
|---|---|---|---|---|---|
| Jayhawks | 7 | 21 | 0 | 21 | 49 |
| Rebels | 7 | 3 | 14 | 12 | 36 |

at Chase Field • Phoenix, AZ

- Date: December 26, 2023
- Game time: 4:00 p.m.
- Game weather: None (Indoor stadium)
- Game attendance: 26,478
- Referee: Tim Hedgepeth
- TV announcers (ESPN): Beth Mowins, Kirk Morrison, Stormy Buonantony

Game information

First quarter

- (11:07) UNLV – Vincent Davis 3-yard run, Jose Pizano kick (Drive: 8 plays, 65 yards, 3:53; UNLV 7–0)
- (2:05) KAN – Luke Grimm 6-yard pass from Jason Bean, Seth Keller kick (Drive: 9 plays, 98 yards, 4:48; Tied 7–7)

Second quarter

- (11:37) KAN – Luke Grimm 60-yard pass from Jason Bean, Seth Keller kick (Drive: 4 plays, 80 yards, 1:56; Kansas 14–7)
- (7:57) KAN – Lawrence Arnold 15-yard pass from Jason Bean, Seth Keller kick (Drive: 5 plays, 66 yards, 1:19; Kansas 21–7)
- (1:21) KAN – Devin Neal 1-yard run, Seth Keller kick (Drive: 8 plays, 70 yards, 3:42; Kansas 28–7)
- (0:00) UNLV – Jose Pizano 40-yard field goal (Drive: 5 plays, 38 yards, 1:15; Kansas 28–10)

Third quarter

- (12:15) UNLV – Shelton Zeon III 5-yard pass from Jayden Maiava, Jose Pizano kick (Drive: 5 plays, 42 yards, 2:39; Kansas 28–17)
- (10:30) UNLV – Ricky White 37-yard pass from Jayden Maiava, Jose Pizano kick (Drive: 1 play, 37 yards, 0:07; Kansas 28–24)

Fourth quarter

- (14:52) KAN – Lawrence Arnold 40-yard pass from Jason Bean, Seth Keller kick (Drive: 10 plays, 99 yards, 6:53; Kansas 35–24)
- (12:06) UNLV – Jacob De Jesus 11-yard run, two-point run failed (Drive: 7 plays, 88 yards, 2:45; Kansas 35–30)
- (11:10) KAN – Lawrence Arnold 56-yard pass from Jason Bean, Seth Keller kick (Drive: 2 plays, 61 yards, 0:50; Kansas 42–30)
- (8:16) KAN – Luke Grimm 43-yard pass from Jason Bean, Seth Keller kick (Drive: 3 plays, 46 yards, 1:33; Kansas 49–30)
- (6:27) UNLV – Senika McKie 50-yard pass from Jayden Maiava, two-point run failed (Drive: 5 plays, 80 yards, 1:44; Kansas 49–36)

| Statistics | KAN | UNLV |
|---|---|---|
| First downs | 22 | 23 |
| Total yards | 591 | 386 |
| Rushing yards | 39–142 | 24–95 |
| Passing yards | 449 | 291 |
| Passing: Comp–Att–Int | 19–28–3 | 24–35–2 |
| Time of possession | 34:06 | 25:54 |

| Team | Category | Player | Statistics |
|---|---|---|---|
| Kansas | Passing | Jason Bean | 19/28, 449 yards, 6 TD, 3 INT |
| Kansas | Rushing | Devin Neal | 20 carries, 71 yards, TD |
| Kansas | Receiving | Luke Grimm | 4 receptions, 160 yards, 3 TD |
| UNLV | Passing | Jayden Maiava | 24/35, 291 yards, 3 TD, 2 INT |
| UNLV | Rushing | Jacob De Jesus | 6 carries, 40 yards, TD |
| UNLV | Receiving | Ricky White | 7 receptions, 97 yards, TD |

== Roster ==
2023 UNLV Rebels football team roster
Players
Coaches
Offense

| Pos. | # | Name | Class |
|---|---|---|---|
| WR | 0 | Senika McKie | Sr |
| QB | 1 | Jayden Maiava | Fr |
| QB | 2 | Doug Brumfield | Jr |
| WR | 3 | Zyell Griffin | Sr |
| RB | 4 | Donavyn Lester | Sr |
| RB | 5 | Vincent Davis Jr. | Sr |
| WR | 6 | Dominic Gicinto | Sr |
| QB | 7 | Cameron Friel | Jr |
| WR | 8 | Timothy Conerly | Jr |
| QB | 9 | Bo Edmundson | Fr |
| WR | 11 | Ricky White | Jr |
| WR | 13 | LJ Holmes | So |
| WR | 14 | Gavin Thomson | Jr |
| WR | 15 | Landon Rogers | So |
| WR | 16 | DeAngelo Irvin Jr. | Fr |
| QB | 18 | Lucas Lenhoff | Fr |
| TE | 19 | Kaleo Ballungay | Jr |
| WR | 21 | Jacob De Jesus | Jr |
| RB | 22 | Jai'Den Thomas | Fr |
| RB | 24 | Darrien Jones | Fr |
| RB | 26 | Courtney Reese | Jr |
| RB | 29 | Jordan Younge-Humphrey | Sr |
| RB | 49 | Andrew Wimmer | Jr |
| OL | 54 | Anthony Rosas | So |
| OL | 56 | Levi Currier | Jr |
| OL | 60 | Amani Trigg-Wright | Sr |
| OL | 61 | Graham Keating III | So |
| OL | 65 | Jack Hasz | Sr |
| OL | 66 | Carver Banker | Fr |
| OL | 68 | Jayden Ahboah | So |
| OL | 69 | Marcus Miller | Jr |
| OL | 70 | Tiger Shanks | Jr |
| OL | 71 | Ed Haynes | Fr |
| OL | 72 | Will Thomas | Fr |
| OL | 73 | Alani Makihele | Jr |
| OL | 74 | Jalen St. John | Jr |
| OL | 75 | Anton Ambuehl | So |
| OL | 76 | Jacob Ahumada | Fr |
| OL | 77 | Michael Bareman | Jr |
| OL | 78 | Mathyus Su'a | Jr |
| OL | 79 | Austin Boyd | Fr |
| WR | 80 | Rogerick Ray | Jr |
| WR | 81 | Bryson Waterman | Fr |
| WR | 82 | Rashawn Jackson | Fr |
| TE | 83 | Cooper Haswell | Fr |
| TE | 84 | Corey Thompson Jr. | Fr |
| TE | 85 | Charlie Williams | Fr |
| TE | 87 | Christian Earls | So |
| TE | 88 | Shelton Zeon III | Sr |
| WR | 89 | Malik Bradford | So |

Defense

| Pos. | # | Name | Class |
|---|---|---|---|
| DB | 1 | Jerrae Williams | Sr |
| DB | 2 | Jaxen Turner | Sr |
| DB | 3 | Johnathan Baldwin | Jr |
| DB | 5 | Cameron Oliver | Jr |
| DL | 6 | Naki Fahina | Sr |
| LB | 7 | Jackson Woodard | Jr |
| DL | 8 | Darius Johnson | Sr |
| DB | 9 | Jett Elad | Jr |
| LB | 10 | Fred Thompkins | Sr |
| OLB | 11 | Zavier Carter | Jr |
| DB | 13 | Cameren Jenkins | Fr |
| DB | 14 | Jah'Von Grigsby | So |
| DB | 17 | Kris Williams | Sr |
| DB | 20 | Trenton Holloway | Sr |
| DB | 23 | Quentin Moten | Jr |
| DB | 24 | Isaiah Hackett | Jr |
| DB | 25 | Jordyn Morgan | Jr |
| DL | 26 | Ose Egbase | Jr |
| DB | 27 | BJ Harris | Sr |
| DL | 28 | Fisher Camac | Fr |
| LB | 30 | Jordan Hanna | So |
| DB | 31 | Jalen Baldwin | Fr |
| DB | 32 | Ricky Johnson | Sr |
| DB | 33 | Tanner Aitken | Fr |
| LB | 34 | Tyray O'Dell | Jr |
| DB | 35 | Anthony Costanzo | Fr |
| DB | 36 | Thomas Anderson | Jr |
| DB | 37 | Davone Walden Jr. | Sr |
| LB | 38 | Marsel McDuffie | So |
| LB | 39 | JT Odom | Fr |
| DB | 40 | Daego Albert | Sr |
| DB | 41 | Rashod Tanner | So |
| LB | 42 | Elijah Shelton | Sr |
| DB | 43 | Jalen Frazier | Sr |
| DL | 44 | Waisale Muavesi | Jr |
| OLB | 45 | Ryan Tuaolo | Fr |
| LB | 46 | Brennon Scott | Jr |
| DL | 50 | Jalen Dixon | Jr |
| LB | 53 | Blesyng Alualu-Tuiolemotu | Fr |
| DL | 55 | Matthew Greene | Fr |
| DL | 57 | LeShaun Bell | Jr |
| LB | 58 | Jordan Eubanks | So |
| DL | 67 | Nathan Arguelles | So |
| DL | 91 | Cooper Webb | Jr |
| DL | 92 | Maxwell Peterson | Fr |
| DL | 93 | Lucas Conti | Fr |
| DL | 94 | Ben Key | Sr |
| DL | 95 | Alexander Whitmore | Jr |
| DL | 97 | Nick Dimitris | So |
| DL | 98 | Tatuo Martinson | Sr |
| DL | 99 | Keith Conley Jr. | Sr |

Special teams

| Pos. | # | Name | Class |
|---|---|---|---|
| PK | 18 | Jose Pizano | Sr |
| PK | 43 | Ramon Villela | Fr |
| P | 48 | Ryan O'Hara | Sr |
| LS | 51 | Bobby Navarro | Jr |
| LS | 52 | Ben Lisk | So |
| LS | 59 | Walker Hardan | Sr |
| PK | 83 | Andre Meono | So |
| P | 90 | Marshall Nichols | So |

Head coach

- Barry Odom

Coordinators/assistant coaches

- Brennan Marion – Offensive coordinator/quarterbacks
- Mike Scherer – Defensive coordinator/linebackers
- James Shibest – Special teams coordinator
- Vance Vice – Offensive line
- Cornell Ford – Running backs
- Del Alexander – Wide receivers
- Nate Longshore – Tight ends
- Ricky Logo – Defensive linemen
- Akeem Davis – Cornerbacks
- Nicco Fertitta – Safeties
- James Brown – Special teams analyst
- Kenneth Merchant – Offensive analyst
- CJ Pollard – Graduate assistant - offense
- Julio Garcia – Graduate assistant - defense
- Ronnell Perkins – Graduate assistant - defense

Legend

- (C) Team captain
- (S) Suspended
- (I) Ineligible
- Injured
- Redshirt

Roster
Last update: 2/12/24
