= Alexander Teubner =

American gridiron football player (born 2000)

- Teubner with the Toronto Argonauts in 2026

No. 33 – Toronto Argonauts
- Position: Defensive back
- Roster status: Active
- CFL status: American

Personal information
- Born: December 26, 2000 (age 25)
- Listed height: 6 ft 1 in (1.85 m)
- Listed weight: 200 lb (91 kg)

Career information
- High school: Seaside (Seaside, Oregon)
- College: Boise State (2019–2024)
- NFL draft: 2025: undrafted

Career history
- BC Lions (2025–2026)*; Toronto Argonauts (2026–present)
- * Offseason or practice squad member only
- Stats at CFL.ca

Alexander Teubner (born December 26, 2000) is an American professional football defensive back for the Toronto Argonauts of the Canadian Football League (CFL). He played college football for the Boise State Broncos.

== Early life ==
Teubner was born on December 26, 2000. He attended Seaside High School in Seaside, Oregon. Teubner played at running back and defensive back, rushing for over 4,000 yards in his final two seasons. He was a three-time All-Cowapa Conference First-team selection as a defensive back.

== College career ==
Teubner played college football for the Boise State Broncos from 2019 to 2024. He played in 54 games, recording 197 tackles, including 8.5 for loss, two sacks, two interceptions, ten pass break ups, three forced fumbles and fumble recoveries. Teubner was named the 2023 Mountain West Championship Defensive MVP, after leading his team with ten tackles and a fumble recovery.

== Professional career ==
Pre-draft measurables
Height	Weight	Arm length	Hand span	Wingspan	40-yard dash	10-yard split	20-yard split	20-yard shuttle	Three-cone drill	Vertical jump	Broad jump	Bench press
5 ft 11 in (1.80 m)	195 lb (88 kg)	30 5/8 in (0.78 m)	9 in (0.23 m)	6 ft 2 1/4 in (1.89 m)	4.59 s	1.64 s	2.57 s	4.16 s	6.80 s	35.5 in (0.90 m)	9 ft 9 in (2.97 m)	16 reps
All values from Pro day

=== BC Lions ===
After not being selected in the 2025 NFL draft, Teubner signed with the BC Lions of the Canadian Football League (CFL) as an undrafted free agent. On May 12, 2026, he was released by the team.

=== Toronto Argonauts ===
On May 13, 2026, Teubner was signed by the Toronto Argonauts. On May 31, he was signed to the practice roster. On June 21, Teubner was elevated to the active roster and made his CFL debut on June 26, registering one special teams tackle against the Saskatchewan Roughriders. On July 1, he was placed on the six-game injured list. Teubner played in two further games before he was again added to the injured list. On September 18, he was elevated to the active roster.
