= Ricky White =

American football player (born 2002)

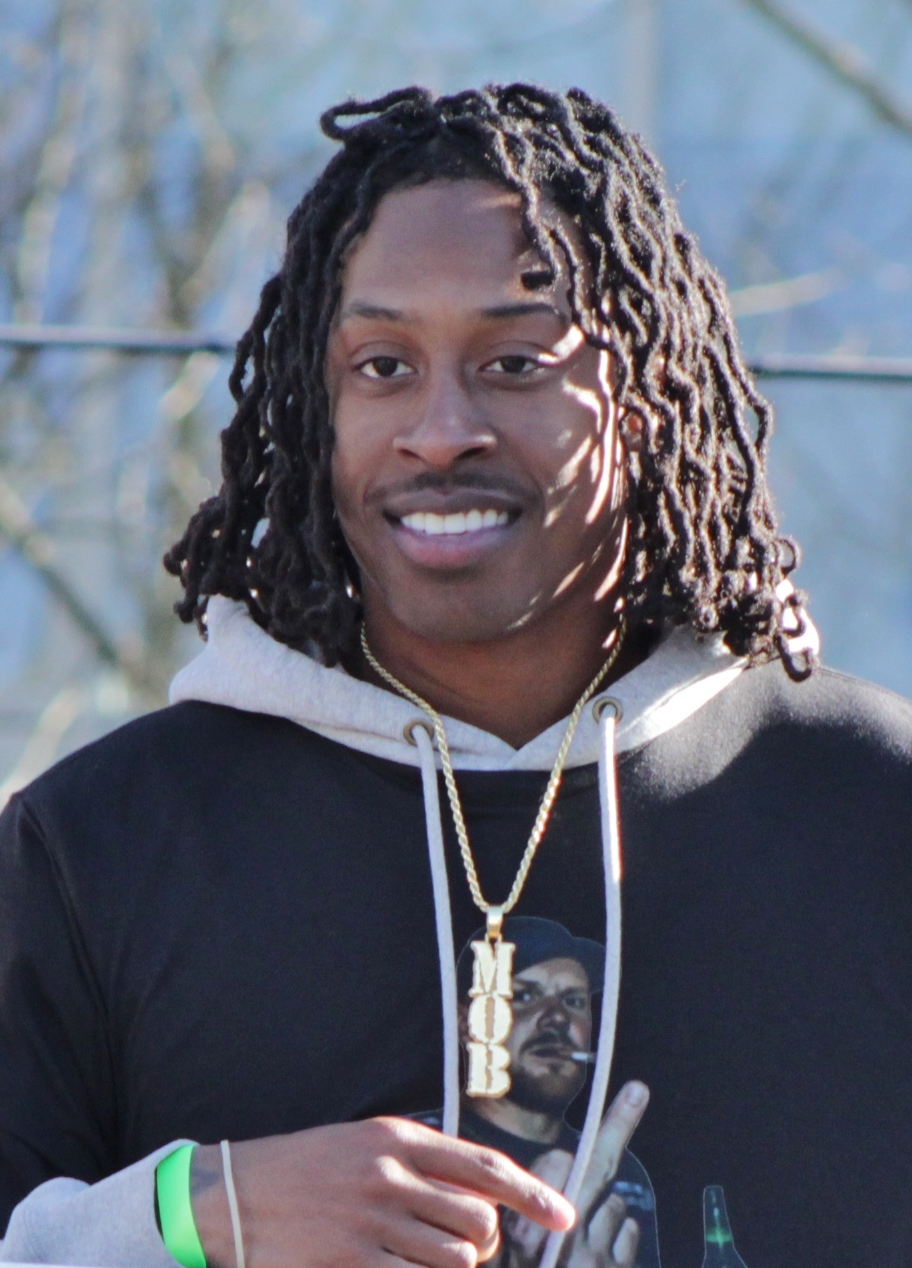
- White at the Super Bowl LX parade

No. 86 – Seattle Seahawks
- Position: Wide receiver
- Roster status: Practice squad

Personal information
- Born: February 6, 2002 (age 24); Dayton, Ohio, U.S.
- Listed height: 6 ft 1 in (1.85 m)
- Listed weight: 181 lb (82 kg)

Career information
- High school: Marietta (Marietta, Georgia)
- College: Michigan State (2020–2021); UNLV (2022–2024)
- NFL draft: 2025: 7th round, 238th overall pick

Career history
- Seattle Seahawks (2025–present)

Awards and highlights
- Super Bowl champion (LX); MW Special Teams Player of the Year (2024); 2× First-team All-MW (2023, 2024)

Career NFL statistics as of 2025
- Games played: 2
- Stats at Pro Football Reference

Ricky Leon White III (born February 6, 2002) is an American professional football wide receiver for the Seattle Seahawks of the National Football League (NFL). He played college football for the Michigan State Spartans and UNLV Rebels and was selected by the Seahawks in the seventh round of the 2025 NFL draft.

== Early life ==
White was born in Dayton, Ohio, and attended Marietta High School in Marietta, Georgia, where he hauled in 55 receptions for 1,006 yards and 13 touchdowns as a senior. He committed to play college football for the Michigan State Spartans.

== College career ==
=== Michigan State ===
White began his college career at Michigan State University. In week 10 of the 2020 season, he recorded eight receptions for 196 yards and a touchdown in an upset victory over Michigan, setting the Spartans' freshman single-game receiving yards record. He finished the 2020 season with ten catches for 223 yards and one touchdown across three games. White did not appear in any games during the 2021 season and entered the NCAA transfer portal following the year.

=== UNLV ===
White transferred to the University of Nevada, Las Vegas ahead of the 2022 season. In the Rebels' season opener, he caught eight passes for 182 yards and two touchdowns in a win over Idaho State. He finished the 2022 season with 51 receptions for 619 yards and four touchdowns.

White had a breakout 2023 season. In week 10, he recorded eight catches for 165 yards and two touchdowns in a 56–14 win over New Mexico. He finished the 2023 regular season with 88 receptions for 1,483 yards and eight touchdowns, earning third-team All-American honors from the Associated Press.

=== Statistics ===
Legend
	Led NCAA Division I FBS
**Bold**	Career high

Year	Team	Games		Receiving				Punt returns				Other	
Year	Team	GP	GS	Rec	Yds	Avg	TD	Ret	Yds	Avg	TD	Sfty	Blk
2020	Michigan State	4	3	10	223	22.3	1						
2021	Michigan State	Redshirt (redshirt)											
2023	UNLV	12	12	51	619	12.1	4						
2023	UNLV	14	13	**88**	**1,483**	16.9	8						
2024	UNLV	12	12	75	1,020	13.6	**11**	**4**	**90**	**22.5**	**1**	**1**	**4**
Career		42	40	223	3,345	14.9	24	4	90	22.5	1	1	4

== Professional career ==
Pre-draft measurables
Height	Weight	Arm length	Hand span	Wingspan	40-yard dash	10-yard split	20-yard split	20-yard shuttle	Vertical jump	Broad jump
6 ft 1 1/8 in (1.86 m)	184 lb (83 kg)	31 3/4 in (0.81 m)	9 1/4 in (0.23 m)	6 ft 4 in (1.93 m)	4.44 s	1.58 s	2.57 s	4.52 s	36.0 in (0.91 m)	10 ft 3 in (3.12 m)
All values from NFL Combine/Pro Day

White was selected in the seventh round (238th overall) by the Seattle Seahawks in the 2025 NFL draft. He was waived on August 26 as part of final roster cuts and re-signed to the practice squad the following day. White was elevated to the active roster ahead of the team's Week 9 matchup against the Washington Commanders.

On February 12, 2026, White signed a reserve/futures contract with Seattle. White was waived again by Seattle as a part of final roster cuts on August 30, and re-signed a day later to the practice squad.
