= List of Fresno State Bulldogs bowl games =

The Fresno State Bulldogs college football team competes as part of the National Collegiate Athletic Association (NCAA) Division I Football Bowl Subdivision (FBS), representing California State University, Fresno in the Mountain West Conference (MW). Since the establishment of the team in 1921, Fresno State has appeared in 32 bowl games. The latest bowl occurred on December 23, 2024, when Fresno State lost to the Northern Illinois Huskies 28–20 in the Famous Idaho Potato Bowl. The loss in that game brought the Bulldogs' overall bowl record to seventeen wins and fifteen losses (17–15).

== Key ==
General
†	Bowl game record attendance
‡	Former bowl game record attendance

Results
W	Win
L	Loss

== Bowl games ==
List of bowl games showing bowl played in, score, date, season, opponent, stadium, location, attendance and head coach (Note: Statistics correct as of 2011–12 NCAA football bowl games.)
#	Bowl	Score (Note: Results are sortable first by whether the result was a Fresno State win, loss or tie and then second by the margin of victory.)	Date	Season (Note: Links to the season article for the Fresno State team that competed in the bowl for that year.)	Opponent (Note: Links to the season article for the opponent that Fresno State competed against in the bowl for that year when available or to their general page when unavailable.)	Stadium	Location	Attendance	Head coach
1	Charity Bowl (Note: The Charity Bowl was unsanctioned by the NCAA. As such, the 1937 appearance in the game is not included in the official NCAA bowl listing for Fresno State.)	W 27–26	December 25, 1937	1937	Central Arkansas Bears	Los Angeles Memorial Coliseum	Los Angeles, CA	5,000	James Bradshaw
2	Pineapple Bowl (Note: The Pineapple Bowl was unsanctioned by the NCAA. As such, the 1941 appearance in the game is not included in the official NCAA bowl listing for Fresno State.)	W 3–0	January 1, 1941	1940	Hawaii Rainbow Warriors	Honolulu Stadium	Honolulu, HI	N/A	James Bradshaw
3	Raisin Bowl	L 13–12	January 1, 1946	1945	Drake Bulldogs	Ratcliffe Stadium	Fresno, CA	10,000	Alvin Pierson
4	Mercy Bowl	W 36–6	November 23, 1961	1961	Bowling Green Falcons	Los Angeles Memorial Coliseum	Los Angeles CA	33,145	Cecil Coleman
5	Mercy Bowl (Note: The 1971 Mercy Bowl was unsanctioned by the NCAA, and as such the 1971 appearance in the game is not included in the official NCAA bowl listing for Fresno State.)	L 17–14	December 11, 1971	1971	Cal State Fullerton Titans	Anaheim Stadium	Anaheim, CA	16,854	Darryl Rogers
6	California Bowl	W 29–28	December 18, 1982	1982	Bowling Green Falcons	Bulldog Stadium	Fresno, CA	30,000^{‡}	Jim Sweeney
7	California Bowl	W 51–7	December 14, 1985	1985	Bowling Green Falcons	Bulldog Stadium	Fresno, CA	32,554^{‡}	Jim Sweeney
8	California Bowl	W 35–30	December 10, 1988	1988	Western Michigan Broncos	Bulldog Stadium	Fresno, CA	31,272	Jim Sweeney
9	California Bowl	W 27–6	December 9, 1989	1989	Ball State Cardinals	Bulldog Stadium	Fresno, CA	31,610	Jim Sweeney
10	California Bowl	L 28–21	December 14, 1991	1991	Bowling Green Falcons	Bulldog Stadium	Fresno, CA	34,825^{†}	Jim Sweeney
11	Freedom Bowl	W 24–7	December 29, 1992	1992	USC Trojans	Anaheim Stadium	Anaheim, CA	50,745^{†}	Jim Sweeney
12	Aloha Bowl	L 41–30	December 25, 1993	1993	Colorado Buffaloes	Aloha Stadium	Honolulu, HI	44,009	Jim Sweeney
13	Las Vegas Bowl	L 17–16	December 18, 1999	1999	Utah Utes	Sam Boyd Stadium	Whitney, NV	28,227^{‡}	Pat Hill
14	Silicon Valley Football Classic	L 37–34	December 31, 2000	2000	Air Force Falcons	Spartan Stadium	San Jose, CA	26,542^{‡}	Pat Hill
15	Silicon Valley Football Classic	L 44–35	December 31, 2001	2001	Michigan State Spartans	Spartan Stadium	San Jose, CA	30,456^{†}	Pat Hill
16	Silicon Valley Football Classic	W 30–21	December 31, 2002	2002	Georgia Tech Yellow Jackets	Spartan Stadium	San Jose, CA	10,132	Pat Hill
17	Silicon Valley Football Classic	W 17–9	December 30, 2003	2003	UCLA Bruins	Spartan Stadium	San Jose, CA	20,126	Pat Hill
18	MPC Computers Bowl	W 37–34	December 27, 2004	2004	Virginia Cavaliers	Bronco Stadium	Boise, ID	28,516	Pat Hill
19	Liberty Bowl	L 31–24	December 31, 2005	2005	Tulsa Golden Hurricane	Liberty Bowl Memorial Stadium	Memphis, TN	54,894	Pat Hill
20	Humanitarian Bowl	W 40–28	December 31, 2007	2007	Georgia Tech Yellow Jackets	Bronco Stadium	Boise, ID	27,062	Pat Hill
21	New Mexico Bowl	L 40–35	December 20, 2008	2008	Colorado State Rams	University Stadium	Albuquerque, NM	24,735	Pat Hill
22	New Mexico Bowl	L 35–28	December 19, 2009	2009	Wyoming Cowboys	University Stadium	Albuquerque, NM	24,898	Pat Hill
23	Humanitarian Bowl	L 40–17	December 18, 2010	2010	Northern Illinois Huskies	Bronco Stadium	Boise, ID	25,449	Pat Hill
24	Hawaiʻi Bowl	L 43–10	December 24, 2012	2012	SMU Mustangs	Aloha Stadium	Honolulu, HI	30,024	Tim DeRuyter
25	Las Vegas Bowl	L 45–20	December 21, 2013	2013	USC Trojans	Sam Boyd Stadium	Whitney, NV	42,178	Tim DeRuyter
26	Hawaiʻi Bowl	L 30–6	December 24, 2014	2014	Rice Owls	Aloha Stadium	Honolulu, HI	25,365	Tim DeRuyter
27	Hawaiʻi Bowl	W 33–27	December 24, 2017	2017	Houston Cougars	Aloha Stadium	Honolulu, HI	20,546	Jeff Tedford
28	Las Vegas Bowl	W 31–20	December 15, 2018	2018	Arizona State Sun Devils	Sam Boyd Stadium	Whitney, NV	37,146	Jeff Tedford
29	New Mexico Bowl	W 31–24	December 18, 2021	2021	UTEP Miners	University Stadium	Albuquerque, NM	16,422	Lee Marks (Interim)
30	LA Bowl	W 29–6	December 17, 2022	2022	Washington State Cougars	SoFi Stadium	Inglewood, CA	32,405	Jeff Tedford
31	New Mexico Bowl	W 37–10	December 16, 2023	2023	New Mexico State Aggies	University Stadium	Albuquerque, NM	30,822	Tim Skipper (acting)
32	Famous Idaho Potato Bowl	L 28–20	December 23, 2024	2024	Northern Illinois Huskies	Albertsons Stadium	Boise, ID	10,359	Tim Skipper (interim)
33	Arizona Bowl	W 18–3	December 27, 2025	2025	Miami (OH) RedHawks	Casino Del Sol Stadium	Tucson, AZ	37,232	Matt Entz
