= Thomas Boeh =

American athletic director

Current position
- Title: Deputy Athletic Director
- Team: Arkansas State
- Conference: Sun Belt Conference

Biographical details
- Education: Loras College

Playing career
- 1977–1981: Track and Field

Administrative career (AD unless noted)
- 1995–2005: Ohio
- 2005–2014: Fresno State
- 2019–present: Arkansas State (Deputy AD)

Thomas Boeh is the deputy athletic director of Arkansas State University in Jonesboro, Arkansas. Formerly, he served as athletic director at Fresno State University in Fresno, California and Ohio University in Athens, Ohio.

== Early years ==
Thomas Boeh received his Bachelor's degree in physical education from Loras College in 1981. While at Loras he was on the cross-country and the indoor and outdoor track and field teams. He made the national finals in the outdoor 5,000-meter run. He was inducted into the Loras College Athletics Hall of Fame in 2021 for in achievements in track and cross-country. After graduating, he was the Loras cross country coach from 1982 through 1984 and was named district coach of the year all three seasons. He earned a Master's degree in athletics administration from University of Illinois in 1988.

== Career ==
While serving as the cross-country coach at Loras he began his career in administrating college athletics working in sports information and marketing and promotions. From 1985 to 1987 he was the director of women's sports information and promotion at the University of Illinois. He left his alma mater for the University of Maine where he served as associate director of athletics for external affairs and then senior associate AD for administration and development. From 1991 to 1995 he worked as the associate director of athletics for external affairs at Northwestern University

=== Ohio ===
From 1995 to 2005 he was the athletic director at Ohio. Durung his tenure at Ohio the men's basketball team won the 2005 MAC tournament to qualify for the NCAA tournament. Ohio also won Mid-American Conference championships baseball, cross country, field hockey, soccer, swimming & diving, volleyball and wrestling. During his tenure at Ohio their student-athletes were recognized as All-conference 192 times, academic all-conference selections 184 times, All-American 28 times, and Academic All-American 25 times.

=== Fresno State ===
Boeh was the athletic director at Fresno State from 2005 through 2014. Freson State won the Western Athletic Conference commissioner's cup in 2008, 2009 and 2012. Under his leadership Fresno State joined the Mountain West Conference in 2012. During his tenure the football team won Mountain West Conference championships in 2012 and 2013 and played in seven bowl games. Also under his leadership, the 2008 Fresno State baseball won the national championship in the College World Series under coach Mike Batesole. In 2014 the National Association of Collegiate Directors of Athletics honored him as one of four national recipients for the Under Armour Athletic Director of the Year for the FBS. The student-athlete graduation rate rose from 45% to 57% during his tenure. In August 2014 he was reassigned to a new role as a special assistant to school president.
