= Tim Skipper =

Tim Skipper may refer to:

- Tim Skipper (American football), American football player and coach
- Tim Skipper, lead vocalist of the American band House of Heroes
