= Levelle Bailey =

American football player (born 2000)

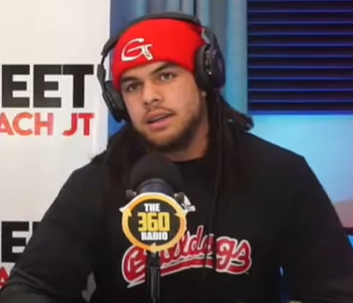
- Bailey in 2022

No. 56 – Denver Broncos
- Position: Linebacker
- Roster status: Injured reserve

Personal information
- Born: December 4, 2000 (age 25); Sacramento, California, U.S.
- Listed height: 6 ft 2 in (1.88 m)
- Listed weight: 225 lb (102 kg)

Career information
- High school: Luther Burbank (Sacramento)
- College: Fresno State (2019–2023)
- NFL draft: 2024: undrafted

Career history
- Denver Broncos (2024–present)

Awards and highlights
- Second-team All-MW (2023); New Mexico Bowl Defensive MVP (2023)

Career NFL statistics as of 2025
- Total tackles: 5
- Stats at Pro Football Reference

Levelle Bailey (born December 4, 2000) is an American professional football linebacker for the Denver Broncos of the National Football League (NFL). He played college football for the Fresno State Bulldogs and was signed by the Broncos as an undrafted free agent in 2024.

== Early life ==
Bailey was born on December 4, 2000, in Sacramento, California to Lester Bailey and Diana Tapa. He attended Luther Burbank High School where he was a top football and basketball athlete, being a first-team All-City selection in each sport. As a senior in football, he was chosen second-team all-state after totaling 81 tackles and 7.0 tackles-for-loss (TFLs). After his high school career, he was invited to the Optimist All-Star Classic game where he blocked two kicks. He committed to play college football for the Fresno State Bulldogs.

== College career ==
As a true freshman at Fresno State in 2019, Bailey started five games and recorded 30 tackles and six TFLs. He started five games again in 2020, posting 21 tackles while being named honorable mention All-Mountain West Conference (MWC). In 2021, he started 12 games and was third on the team with 56 tackles, adding 8.0 TFLs, 3.5 sacks, two interceptions and six pass breakups, repeating as an honorable mention All-MWC pick. The following season, he started all 14 games and was the Bulldogs leader with 88 tackles, earning his third honorable mention All-MWC selection.

In his final year, 2023, Bailey served as a team captain. He recorded 82 tackles, 2.5 sacks, five TFLs and three interceptions while being named second-team All-MWC. He led the Bulldogs to a win in the 2023 New Mexico Bowl and was named the game's defensive MVP. He received invites to the Hula Bowl and East–West Shrine Bowl at the conclusion of his collegiate career. Bailey finished his stint at Fresno State having played in 58 games, tallying 277 tackles, 25.5 TFLs, seven sacks and six interceptions.

== Professional career ==
Pre-draft measurables
Height	Weight	Arm length	Hand span	Wingspan	40-yard dash	10-yard split	20-yard split	20-yard shuttle	Three-cone drill	Vertical jump	Broad jump	Bench press
6 ft 1 5/8 in (1.87 m)	227 lb (103 kg)	32 in (0.81 m)	10 in (0.25 m)	6 ft 2 5/8 in (1.90 m)	4.73 s	1.73 s	2.76 s	4.36 s	7.23 s	31.5 in (0.80 m)	9 ft 5 in (2.87 m)	16 reps
All values from Pro Day

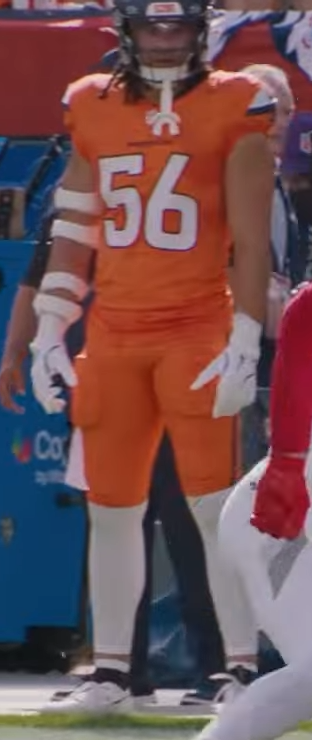
Bailey with the Denver Broncos in 2025

After going unselected in the 2024 NFL draft, Bailey signed with the Denver Broncos as an undrafted free agent. In the team's preseason finale against the Arizona Cardinals, he returned an interception 94-yards for a touchdown. On August 29, 2024, Bailey was waived by the Broncos after initially making the team's 53-man roster. The next day, he was re-signed to the practice squad. On October 8, Bailey was promoted to the active roster.

On August 26, 2025, the Broncos waived Bailey once again. He was re-signed to the practice squad the next day. Bailey was elevated from the practice squad for the team's Week 1 home opener against the Tennessee Titans.

On January 26, 2026, Bailey signed a futures contract with the Broncos. After suffering a broken leg during the Broncos' first preseason game, Bailey was waived with an injury designation of August 20. The following day, he reverted to injured reserve.

== Personal life ==
Bailey's father, Lester, is African-American and Bailey's mother, Diana, is from Tonga. He has six older siblings.

In college, Bailey majored in kinesiology.
