= 2024 Famous Idaho Potato Bowl =

Postseason college football bowl game

- 28th Famous Idaho Potato Bowl
Northern Illinois Huskies	Fresno State Bulldogs
(7–5)	(6–6)
MAC	MW
28	20
Head coach: Thomas Hammock	Head coach: Tim Skipper (interim)
	1	2	3	4	OT	2OT	Total
Northern Illinois	3	0	10	0	7	8	28
Fresno State	13	0	0	0	7	0	20
- Date: December 23, 2024
- Season: 2024
- Stadium: Albertsons Stadium
- Location: Boise, Idaho
- MVP: Josh Holst (QB, Northern Illinois)
- Favorite: Northern Illinois by 2
- Referee: Marshall Lewis (Sun Belt)
- Attendance: 10,359

United States TV coverage
- Network: ESPN
- Announcers: Lowell Galindo (play-by-play), Fozzy Whittaker (analyst), and Tori Petry (analyst)

International TV coverage
- Network: ESPN Brazil
- Announcers: ESPN Brazil: Ari Aguiar (play-by-play) and Weinny Eirado (analyst)

The 2024 Famous Idaho Potato Bowl was a college football bowl game played on December 23, 2024, at Albertsons Stadium located in Boise, Idaho. The 28th annual Famous Idaho Potato Bowl game featured Northern Illinois and Fresno State. The game began at approximately 12:30 p.m. MST and aired on ESPN. The Famous Idaho Potato Bowl was one of the 2024–25 bowl games concluding the 2024 FBS football season. The game was sponsored by the Idaho Potato Commission.

== Teams ==
Consistent with conference tie-ins, the game featured Northern Illinois from the Mid-American Conference (MAC) and Fresno State from the Mountain West Conference. This was the second meeting of these teams in a Famous Idaho Potato Bowl; the teams met in the 2010 Humanitarian Bowl when the bowl was known by that name—Northern Illinois won, 40–17.

=== Northern Illinois Huskies ===
Northern Illinois ended their regular season with a 7–5 record (4–4 in conference) after winning three of their final four games. The Huskies faced one ranked team during the season, defeating Notre Dame, 16–14, on September 7.

=== Fresno State Bulldogs ===
Fresno State posted a 6–6 record (4–3 in conference), losing three of their final four games. The Bulldogs faced two ranked teams in FBS, losing to Michigan, 30–10, on August 31, and losing to UNLV, 59–14, on September 28. The 2024 Michigan Football Team was no longer ranked by the end of the season but did beat The Ohio State at the shoe 13–10, on November 30. The Bulldogs were led by Tim Skipper, who was named interim head coach in mid-July following the departure of Jeff Tedford due to health concerns. Fresno State entered the matchup having won their five most recent bowl game appearances.

== Game summary ==
2024 Famous Idaho Potato Bowl

Quarter	1	2	3	4	OT	2OT	Total
Northern Illinois	3	0	10	0	7	8	28
Fresno State	13	0	0	0	7	0	20

at Albertsons Stadium • Boise, Idaho

- Date: Monday, December 23, 2024
- Game time: 12:34 p.m. MST
- Game weather: Cloudy • Temperature: 44 °F (7 °C) • Wind: 5 mph (8.0 km/h) northwest
- Game attendance: 10,359
- Referee: Marshall Lewis
- TV announcers (ESPN): Lowell Galindo (play-by-play), Fozzy Whittaker (analyst), and Tori Petry (analyst)
- Box score

Game information

First Quarter

- (11:29) FRES – Bryson Donelson 1 yard run, two-point pass conversion failed (Drive: 3 plays, 25 yards, 0:58; Fresno State 6–0)
- (2:45) NIU – Fresno State 26 yard field goal (Drive: 16 plays, 63 yards, 8:44; Fresno State 6–3)
- (1:08) FRES – Joshua Wood 13 yard run, Dylan Lynch kick (Drive: 4 plays, 90 yards, 1:37; Fresno State 13–3)

Second Quarter

- No scoring.

Third Quarter

- (11:22) NIU – Grayson Barnes 26 yard pass from Josh Holst, Kanon Woodill kick (Drive: 7 plays, 76 yards, 3:38; Fresno State 13–10)
- (7:39) NIU – Kanon Woodill 34 yard field goal (Drive: 5 plays, 34 yards, 2:11; Tied 13–13)

Fourth Quarter

- No scoring. (Fresno State kicker, Dylan Lynch missed a potential game winning field goal as time expired.)

Overtime

- FRES – Bryson Donelson 9 yard pass from Joshua Wood, Dylan Lynch kick (Drive: 3 plays, 25 yards; Fresno State 20–13)
- NIU – Grayson Barnes 3 yard pass from Josh Holst, Kanon Woodill kick (Drive: 5 plays, 25 yards; Tied 20–20)

Second Overtime

- NIU – Dane Pardridge 25 yard pass from George Dimopoulos, George Dimopoulos two-point pass conversion from Josh Holst (Drive: 1 plays, 25 yards; Northern Illinois 28–20)

=== Statistics ===
Statistics	NIU	FSU
First downs	24	17
Plays–yards	79–368	56–328
Rushes–yards	48–161	27–117
Passing yards	207	211
Passing: comp–att–int	19–31–1	19–29–1
Time of possession	39:14	20:46

Team	Category	Player	Statistics
Northern Illinois	Passing	Josh Holst	18/30, 182 yards, 2 TD, INT
Northern Illinois	Rushing	Josh Holst	16 carries, 65 yards
Northern Illinois	Receiving	Dane Pardridge	3 receptions, 59 yards, TD
Fresno State	Passing	Joshua Wood	16/23, 180 yards, TD
Fresno State	Rushing	Bryson Donelson	15 carries, 82 yards
Fresno State	Receiving	Mac Dalena	6 receptions, 118 yards
