= Mikey Keene =

American football player

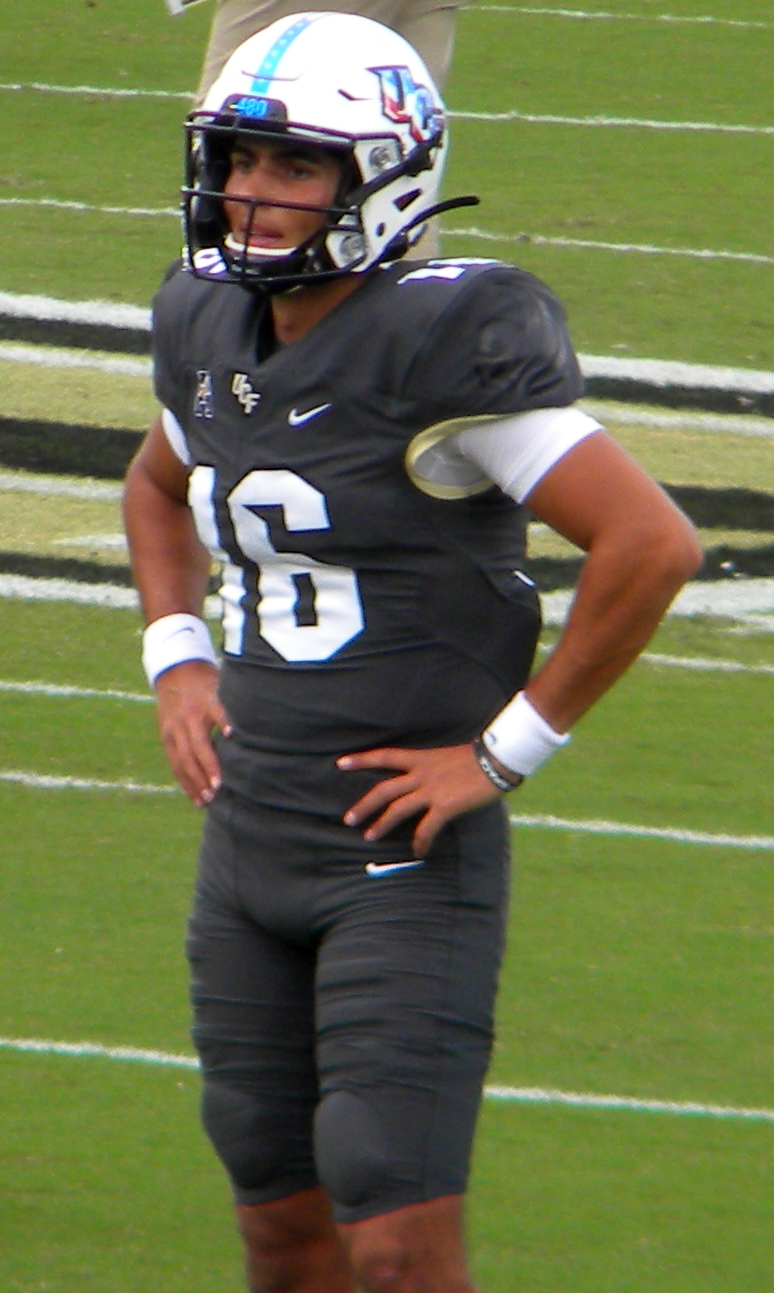
- Keene with the UCF Knights in 2021

No. 12 – Arizona State Sun Devils
- Position: Quarterback
- Class: Graduate

Personal information
- Born: June 5, 2003 (age 23)
- Listed height: 5 ft 11 in (1.80 m)
- Listed weight: 200 lb (91 kg)

Career information
- High school: Chandler (Chandler, Arizona)
- College: UCF (2021–2022); Fresno State (2023–2024); Michigan (2025); Arizona State (2026–present)
- Stats at ESPN

Mikey Keene (born June 5, 2003) is an American college football quarterback for the Arizona State Sun Devils. He previously played for the UCF Knights, Fresno State Bulldogs, and Michigan Wolverines.

== Early life ==
Keene attended Chandler High School in Chandler, Arizona. In his junior season, he recorded 193 completions for 2,835 yards and 23 touchdowns, winning a state championship in 2019. In his senior season, he completed 154 passes for 2,069 yards and 22 touchdowns, winning a second straight state championship as the starting quarterback at Chandler. It was Chandler's fifth consecutive as a program. As a three-star recruit, Keene committed to play college football at the University of Central Florida (UCF).

== College career ==
=== UCF ===
In 2021, Keene enrolled at the University of Central Florida and was the UCF Knights backup to future Heisman Trophy finalist Dillon Gabriel. After an injury to Gabriel, Keene became the starter as a true freshman. He made ten starts, totaling 1,730 yards and 18 total touchdowns. Keene threw for 144 yards and one touchdown in the 2021 Gasparilla Bowl, leading UCF to a 29–17 over Florida. In 2022, Keene was the Knights backup to John Rhys Plumlee, where he would only appear in four games. He finished the season with 647 yards and six touchdowns, before entering the NCAA transfer portal.

=== Fresno State ===
On December 21, 2022, Keene announced his decision to transfer to Fresno State. In 2023, he entered the season as the Bulldogs’ starting quarterback. In the season opener against Purdue, Keene threw for four touchdowns and 366 yards, leading Fresno State to a 39–35 victory. Against Arizona State, Keene threw for 281 yards and two touchdowns, leading Fresno State to a 29–0 shutout win. Keene led Fresno State to a 9–4 record and a 37–10 victory in the 2023 New Mexico Bowl. In the New Mexico Bowl, he threw for a career-high 380 yards and recorded four total touchdowns, being named the game's offensive MVP. Keene finished the season throwing for 2,976 yards and 24 touchdowns.

In 2024, Keene opened the season playing his future team the next year, the Michigan Wolverines. He completed 22 of 36 passes for 238 yards, one touchdown and two interceptions (including a pick-six by Will Johnson). In total for the season, he threw for 2,892 yards with 18 touchdowns and 11 interceptions. Following the season, he entered the transfer portal for a second time in his career.

=== Michigan ===
On December 23, 2024, Keene transferred to the University of Michigan for his fifth season of college football in 2025, playing under head coach Sherrone Moore. He reunited with Michigan’s offensive coordinator and quarterbacks coach Chip Lindsey, both at UCF in 2022. Keene competed with sophomore Jadyn Davis and the nation’s No. 1 overall ranked high school recruit, incoming freshman Bryce Underwood, with Underwood beating out both. In January 2026, Keene re-entered the transfer portal after not appearing in a single game for Michigan.

=== Arizona State ===
On January 8, 2026, Keene announced his decision to transfer to Arizona State University to play for the Arizona State Sun Devils.

=== Statistics ===
Year	Team	Games			Passing								Rushing			
Year	Team	GP	GS	Record	Cmp	Att	Pct	Yds	Y/A	TD	Int	Rtg	Att	Yds	Avg	TD
2021	UCF	11	10	7–3	173	272	63.6	1,730	6.4	17	6	133.2	35	-36	-1.0	1
2022	UCF	4	1	1–0	60	83	72.3	647	7.8	6	1	159.2	13	-13	-1.0	0
2023	Fresno State	12	11	8–3	283	422	67.1	2,976	7.1	24	10	140.3	29	-136	-4.7	1
2024	Fresno State	12	12	6–6	277	393	70.5	2,892	7.4	18	11	141.8	47	-194	-4.1	0
2025	Michigan	0	0	—	DNP											
2026	Arizona State	3	1	1–0	39	61	63.9	448	7.3	2	0	136.0	6	-48	-8.0	0
Career		42	35	24−13	832	1,231	67.6	8,693	7.1	67	28	140.3	130	-427	-3.3	2
