= Tim Skipper (American football) =

American football player and coach (born 1978)

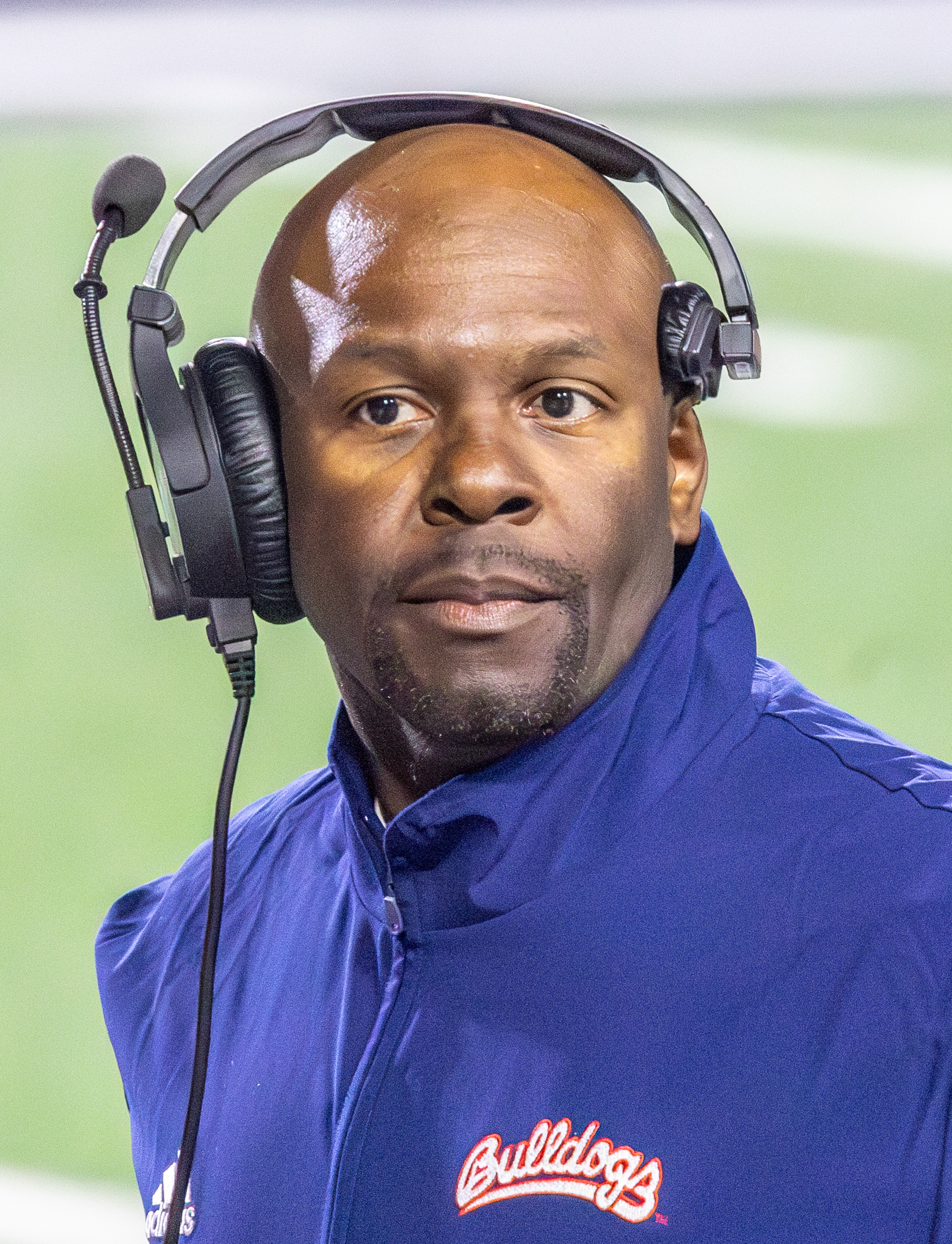
- Skipper in 2024

Current position
- Title: Head coach
- Team: Cal Poly
- Conference: Big Sky
- Record: 3-5

Biographical details
- Born: April 15, 1978 (age 48); San Jose, California

Playing career
- 1997–2000: Fresno State
- Position: Middle linebacker

Coaching career (HC unless noted)
- 2001: Western New Mexico (DB)
- 2002: Western New Mexico (DC/DB)
- 2003: Sacramento State (DB)
- 2004–2005: Sacramento State (DC/DB)
- 2006–2008: Fresno State (RB)
- 2009–2011: Fresno State (LB/RGC)
- 2011: Fresno State (interim DC)
- 2012–2013: Colorado State (LB)
- 2013–2014: Colorado State (AHC/LB)
- 2015–2016: Florida (RB)
- 2017–2018: Florida (LB)
- 2018–2019: UNLV (DC/LB)
- 2020: Central Michigan (LB)
- 2021: Central Michigan (AHC/LB)
- 2022–2023: Fresno State (AHC/LB)
- 2023: Fresno State (acting HC)
- 2024: Fresno State (interim HC)
- 2025: UCLA (special assistant to the head coach)
- 2025: UCLA (interim HC)
- 2026–present: Cal Poly

Head coaching record
- Overall: 11–13
- Bowls: 1–1

Accomplishments and honors

Awards
- First-team All-WAC (1997); 2× second-team All-WAC (1999, 2000)

Timmy James Skipper (born April 15, 1978) is an American college football coach and former player who is the head football coach at California Polytechnic State University, San Luis Obispo. He previously served as the interim head coach at the University of California, Los Angeles (UCLA) in 2025 following the firing of DeShaun Foster after an 0–3 start to the season. Skipper previously served as the interim head football coach at California State University, Fresno for the bowl game in 2023 and the entire 2024 season. He was the assistant head coach and linebackers coach at Fresno State from 2022 to 2023. Skipper played college football at Fresno State as a middle linebacker from 1997 to 2000.

== Early life and education ==
Timmy James Skipper was born in 1978 in San Jose, California. His father, Jim Skipper, was defensive backs coach at San Jose State at the time. Tim Skipper lived in multiple states as a child due to his father's football coaching career, before settling in Kenner, Louisiana, in 1986 when Jim became running backs coach for the New Orleans Saints.

Tim Skipper graduated from Alfred Bonnabel High School in 1996. At Bonnabel, Skipper played at linebacker, earning team MVP and first-team all-district honors in his senior season of 1995.

Skipper enrolled at California State University, Fresno, in 1996. For the Fresno State Bulldogs, he played at middle linebacker from 1997 to 2000 after redshirting in 1996 due to a leg injury. During his time there, he was a two-year defensive captain and three-time All-WAC selection, he ranks second in school history with 418 career tackles, including 117 in his first campaign, when he earned freshman All-America recognition.

== Coaching career ==
=== Western New Mexico ===
In 2001, Skipper was hired as the defensive backs coach at Western New Mexico University. In 2002, he was promoted to defensive coordinator.

=== Sacramento State ===
In 2003, Skipper joined California State University, Sacramento as their defensive backs coach under head coach Steve Mooshagian. In 2004, he was promoted to defensive coordinator.

=== Fresno State ===
In 2006, Skipper was hired as the running backs coach at California State University, Fresno under head coach Pat Hill. In 2009, he was promoted to linebackers coach and defensive run game coordinator. In 2011, Skipper served as the interim defensive coordinator.

=== Colorado State ===
On January 5, 2012, Skipper joined Colorado State University as their linebackers coach under head coach Jim McElwain. In 2013, he was promoted to assistant head coach.

=== Florida ===
In 2015, Skipper was hired as the running backs coach at the University of Florida, following head coach Jim McElwain. In 2017, he was promoted to linebackers coach.

=== UNLV ===
In 2018, Skipper was hired as the defensive coordinator and linebackers coach at the University of Nevada, Las Vegas (UNLV) under head coach Tony Sanchez.

=== Central Michigan ===
In 2020, Skipper joined Central Michigan University as their linebackers coach, reuniting with head coach Jim McElwain. In 2021, he was promoted to assistant head coach.

=== Fresno State (second stint) ===
In 2022, Skipper was hired as the assistant head coach and linebackers coach at California State University, Fresno under head coach Jeff Tedford. In 2023, he served as acting head coach.

On July 15, 2024, Skipper was named interim head coach, following the departure of Jeff Tedford.

=== UCLA ===
In July 2025, Skipper was hired as an assistant coach at UCLA.

Following the firing of DeShaun Foster on September 14, 2025, Skipper was named the interim head coach of the UCLA football program. In his second game in charge, UCLA pulled off an upset victory over No. 7 Penn State, followed next week by a 38–13 rout of Michigan State.

=== Cal Poly ===
On December 3, 2025, Skipper was named the 19th head coach at California Polytechnic State University, San Luis Obispo.

== Personal life ==
Like their father Jim, Skipper's brother Kelly is a longtime college and NFL assistant football coach.

== Head coaching record ==
=== College ===
Year	Team	Overall	Conference	Standing	Bowl/playoffs
Fresno State Bulldogs (Mountain West Conference) (2023–2024)
2023	Fresno State	1–0			W New Mexico (Note: Skipper served as acting head coach due to Jeff Tedford's health concerns.)
2024	Fresno State	6–7	4–3	4th	L Famous Idaho Potato
Fresno State:		7–7	4–3		
UCLA Bruins (Big Ten Conference) (2025)
2025	UCLA	3–6	3–6	T–12th	
UCLA:		3–6	3–6		
Cal Poly Mustangs (Big Sky Conference) (2026–present)
2026	Cal Poly	1–0	1–0		
Cal Poly:		1–0	1–0		
Total:		11–13			
