= 2023 Fresno State Bulldogs football team =

American college football season

2023 Fresno State Bulldogs football

New Mexico Bowl champion

New Mexico Bowl, W 37−10 vs. New Mexico State
- Conference: Mountain West Conference
- Record: 9–4 (4–4 MW)
- Head coach: Jeff Tedford (5th season; regular season); Tim Skipper (bowl game)
- Offensive coordinator: Pat McCann (1st season)
- Offensive scheme: Multiple
- Defensive coordinator: Kevin Coyle (6th season)
- Base defense: 4–3
- Home stadium: Valley Children's Stadium

2023 Mountain West Conference football standings
	Conf.			Overall
Team	W		L	W		L
UNLV y	6	–	2	9	–	5
Boise State y$	6	–	2	8	–	6
San Jose State	6	–	2	7	–	6
Air Force	5	–	3	9	–	4
Wyoming	5	–	3	9	–	4
Fresno State	4	–	4	9	–	4
Utah State	4	–	4	6	–	7
Hawaii	3	–	5	5	–	8
Colorado State	3	–	5	5	–	7
Nevada	2	–	6	2	–	10
New Mexico	2	–	6	4	–	8
San Diego State	2	–	6	4	–	8
Championship: Boise State 44, UNLV 20
$ – Conference champion; y – Championship game participant

The 2023 Fresno State Bulldogs football team represented California State University, Fresno as a member of the Mountain West Conference during the 2023 NCAA Division I FBS football season. The Bulldogs were led by head coach Jeff Tedford in his fifth overall season with the program. The Bulldogs played home games at Valley Children's Stadium on the university's Fresno, California campus. The Fresno State Bulldogs football team drew an average home attendance of 39,969 in 2023.

== Schedule ==
The Bulldogs' home opener on September 9 against Eastern Washington was the first game in FBS history with linear television coverage exclusively in Spanish. The only options for English-language viewers were streaming outlets, none of which provided their own commentary; all English commentary was a simulcast of Fresno State's (English) radio coverage.

Date	Time	Opponent	Rank	Site	TV	Result	Attendance
September 2	9:00 a.m.	at Purdue*		Ross-Ade Stadium; West Lafayette, IN	BTN	W 39–35	54,898
September 9	6:00 p.m.	Eastern Washington*		Valley Children's Stadium; Fresno, CA	UniMás/MW Network	W 34–31 ^{2OT}	41,031
September 16	7:30 p.m.	at Arizona State*		Mountain America Stadium; Tempe, AZ	FS1	W 29–0	46,723
September 23	7:30 p.m.	Kent State*		Valley Children's Stadium; Fresno, CA	CBSSN	W 53–10	38,728
September 30	7:30 p.m.	Nevada	No. 25	Valley Children's Stadium; Fresno, CA	FS1	W 27–9	39,246
October 7	5:00 p.m.	at Wyoming	No. 24	War Memorial Stadium; Laramie, WY	FOX	L 19–24	20,788
October 13	6:00 p.m.	at Utah State		Maverik Stadium; Logan, UT	CBSSN	W 37–32	17,220
October 28	7:30 p.m.	UNLV^{†}		Valley Children's Stadium; Fresno, CA	FS1	W 31–24	41,031
November 4	7:00 p.m.	Boise State		Valley Children's Stadium; Fresno, CA (rivalry)	CBSSN	W 37–30	41,031
November 11	7:30 p.m.	at San Jose State		CEFCU Stadium; San Jose, CA (rivalry)	CBSSN	L 18–42	18,886
November 18	7:30 p.m.	New Mexico		Valley Children's Stadium; Fresno, CA	FS1	L 17–25	38,569
November 25	7:30 p.m.	at San Diego State		Snapdragon Stadium; San Diego, CA (rivalry)	FS1	L 18–33	22,000
December 16	2:45 p.m.	vs. New Mexico State		University Stadium; Albuquerque, NM (New Mexico Bowl)	ESPN	W 37–10	30,822
*Non-conference game; ^{†}Homecoming; Rankings from AP Poll (and CFP Rankings, after November 7) - Released prior to game; All times are in Pacific time

== Game summaries ==
=== At Purdue ===
Fresno State Bulldogs at Purdue Boilermakers – Game summary

Quarter	1	2	3	4	Total
Bulldogs	7	10	8	14	39
Boilermakers	7	14	7	7	35

at Ross-Ade Stadium • West Lafayette, Indiana

- Date: September 2
- Game time: 9:00 a.m. PDT/12:00 p.m. EDT
- Game weather: Sunny • Temperature: 79 °F (26 °C) • Wind: SW 6mph
- Game attendance: 54,898
- Referee: Ron Snodgrass
- TV announcers (BTN): Cory Provus (play-by-play) & Jake Butt (analyst) & Brooke Fletcher (sideline)

Game information

First quarter

- (11:40) PUR – Deion Burks 84-yard pass from Hudson Card, Ben Freehill kick (Drive: 3 plays, 92 yards, 1:15; Purdue 7–0)
- (7:26) FRES – Erik Brooks 29-yard pass from Mikey Keene, Dylan Lynch kick (Drive: 6 plays, 55 yards, 2:22; Tied 7–7)

Second quarter

- (14:57) PUR – Tyrone Tracy Jr. 1-yard run, Ben Freehill kick (Drive: 8 plays, 17 yards, 4:01; Purdue 14–7)
- (12:29) FRES – Jalen Moss 8-yard pass from Mikey Keene, Dylan Lynch kick (Drive: 6 plays, 60 yards, 2:28; Tied 14–14)
- (9:05) PUR – Deion Burks 17-yard pass from Hudson Card, Ben Freehill kick (Drive: 6 plays, 59 yards, 3:20; Purdue 21–14)
- (0:00) FRES – Dylan Lynch 52-yard field goal (Drive: 4 plays, 20 yards, 0:22; Purdue 21–17)

Third quarter

- (14:49) PUR – Tyrone Tracy Jr. 98-yard kickoff return, Ben Freehill kick (Purdue 28–17)
- (6:44) FRES – Jaelen Gill 18-yard pass from Mikey Keene, Jalen Moss–Mikey Keene pass (Drive: 9 plays, 74 yards, 3:59; Purdue 28–25)

Fourth quarter

- (13:44) FRES – Malik Sherrod 1-yard run, Dylan Lynch kick (Drive: 14 plays, 85 yards, 5:44; Fresno State 32–28)
- (4:36) PUR – Devin Mockobee 11-yard run, Ben Freehill kick (Drive: 2 plays, 55 yards, 0:41; Purdue 35–32)
- (0:59) FRES – Erik Brooks 22-yard pass from Mikey Keene, Dylan Lynch kick (Drive: 9 plays, 79 yards, 3:31; Fresno State 39–35)

Statistics	FRES	PUR
First downs	27	19
Plays–yards	81–487	61–363
Rushes–yards	37–116	30–109
Passing yards	371	254
Passing: comp–att–int	32–45–1	17–30–0
Time of possession	36:33	23:27

Team	Category	Player	Statistics
Fresno State	Passing	Mikey Keene	31/44, 365 yards, 4 TD, INT
Fresno State	Rushing	Elijah Gilliam	20 rushes, 93 yards
Fresno State	Receiving	Erik Brooks	9 receptions, 170 yards, 2 TD
Purdue	Passing	Hudson Card	17/30, 254 yards, 2 TD
Purdue	Rushing	Devin Mockobee	16 rushes, 60 yards, TD
Purdue	Receiving	Deion Burks	4 receptions, 152 yards, 2 TD

=== Eastern Washington ===
Eastern Washington Eagles at Fresno State Bulldogs – Game summary

Quarter	1	2	3	4	OT	2OT	Total
Eagles	3	0	14	7	7	0	31
Bulldogs	7	7	7	3	7	3	34

at Valley Children's Stadium • Fresno, California

- Date: September 9
- Game time: 6:00 p.m. PDT
- Game weather: Sunny • Temperature: 95 °F (35 °C) • Wind: NW 6mph
- Game attendance: 41,031
- Referee: Patrick Foy
- TV announcers (UniMás / MW Network): Jessi Losada (play-by-play) & Jaime Motta (analyst) & Alejandro Luna (sideline)

Game information

First quarter

- (11:34) FRES – Elijah Gilliam 5-yard run, Dylan Lynch kick (Drive: 3 plays, 42 yards, 1:14; Fresno State 7–0)
- (2:40) EWU – Soren McKee 24-yard field goal (Drive: 21 plays, 85 yards, 8:51; Fresno State 7–3)

Second quarter

- (13:31) FRES – Jake Boust 6-yard pass from Mikey Keene, Dylan Lynch kick (Drive: 4 plays, 20 yards, 1:24; Fresno State 14–3)

Third quarter

- (11:15) EWU – Michael Wortham 12-yard run, Soren McKee kick (Drive: 7 plays, 62 yards, 2:21; Fresno State 14–10)
- (8:01) FRES – Erik Brooks 29-yard pass from Mikey Keene, Dylan Lynch kick (Drive: 8 plays, 75 yards, 3:14; Fresno State 21–10)
- (3:06) EWU – Efton Chism III 2-yard pass from Michael Wortham, Soren McKee kick (Drive: 11 plays, 75 yards, 4:55; Fresno State 21–17)

Fourth quarter

- (10:01) EWU – Justice Jackson 33-yard run, Soren McKee kick (Drive: 10 plays, 74 yards, 3:28; Eastern Washington 24–21)
- (6:44) FRES – Dylan Lynch 44-yard field goal (Drive: 7 plays, 44 yards, 3:17; Tied 24–24)

First overtime

- (0:00) EWU – Anthony Stell, Jr. 1-yard pass from Kekoa Visperas, Soren Mckee kick (Drive: 4 plays, 25 yards; Eastern Washington 31–24)
- (0:00) FRES – Elijah Gilliam 1-yard run, Abraham Montano kick (Drive: 4 plays, 25 yards; Tied 31–31)

Second overtime

- (0:00) FRES – Dylan Lynch 25-yard field goal (Drive: 4 plays, 18 yards; Fresno State 34–31)

Statistics	EWU	FRES
First downs	22	21
Plays–yards	84–336	73–364
Rushes–yards	38–133	34–141
Passing yards	233	223
Passing: comp–att–int	27–46–1	23–39–1
Time of possession	32:09	29:03

Team	Category	Player	Statistics
Eastern Washington	Passing	Kekoa Visperas	23/41, 198 yards, TD, INT
Eastern Washington	Rushing	Justice Jackson	11 rushes, 79 yards, TD
Eastern Washington	Receiving	Anthony Stell, Jr.	7 receptions, 77 yards, TD
Fresno State	Passing	Mikey Keene	23/39, 223 yards, 2 TD, INT
Fresno State	Rushing	Elijah Gilliam	20 rushes, 86 yards, 2 TD
Fresno State	Receiving	Erik Brooks	8 receptions, 95 yards, TD

=== At Arizona State ===
Fresno State Bulldogs at Arizona State Sun Devils – Game summary

Quarter	1	2	3	4	Total
Bulldogs	10	6	10	3	29
Sun Devils	0	0	0	0	0

at Mountain America Stadium • Tempe, Arizona

- Date: September 16
- Game time: 7:30 p.m. PDT/7:30 p.m. MST
- Game weather: Sunny • Temperature: 95 °F (35 °C) • Wind:
- Game attendance: 46,723
- Referee: John Love
- TV announcers (FS1): Alex Faust (play-by-play) & Petros Papadakis (analyst)

Game information

First quarter

- (11:27) FRES – Jalen Moss 19-yard pass from Mikey Keene, Dylan Lynch kick (Drive: 8 plays, 75 yards, 3:33; Fresno State 7–0)
- (5:50) FRES – Dylan Lynch 39-yard field goal (Drive: 9 plays, 31 yards, 4:31; Fresno State 10–0)

Second quarter

- (12:23) FRES – Dylan Lynch 30-yard field goal (Drive: 11 plays, 56 yards, 5:08; Fresno State 13–0)
- (10:25) FRES – Dylan Lynch 29-yard field goal (Drive: 4 plays, 2 yards, 0:58; Fresno State 16–0)

Third quarter

- (12:03) FRES – Jaelen Gill 42-yard pass from Mikey Keene, Dylan Lynch kick (Drive: 5 plays, 68 yards, 1:32; Fresno State 23–0)
- (6:22) FRES – Dylan Lynch 50-yard field goal (Drive: 8 plays, 0 yards, 3:57; Fresno State 26–0)

Fourth quarter

- (14:31) FRES – Dylan Lynch 33-yard field goal (Drive: 4 plays, 0 yards, 0:17; Fresno State 29–0)

Statistics	FRES	ASU
First downs	24	15
Plays–yards	83–350	64–230
Rushes–yards	34–69	27–42
Passing yards	281	188
Passing: comp–att–int	32–49–0	17–37–5
Time of possession	37:06	22:54

Team	Category	Player	Statistics
Fresno State	Passing	Mikey Keene	32/49, 281 yards, 2 TD
Fresno State	Rushing	Elijah Gilliam	18 rushes, 68 yards
Fresno State	Receiving	Erik Brooks	11 receptions, 104 yards
Arizona State	Passing	Jacob Conover	6/16, 89 yards, 2 INT
Arizona State	Rushing	Kyson Brown	5 rushes, 23 yards
Arizona State	Receiving	Bryce Pierre	3 receptions, 35 yards

=== Kent State ===
Kent State Golden Flashes at Fresno State Bulldogs – Game summary

Quarter	1	2	3	4	Total
Golden Flashes	7	3	0	0	10
Bulldogs	22	14	14	3	53

at Valley Children's Stadium • Fresno, California

- Date: September 23
- Game time: 7:30 p.m. PDT
- Game weather: Clear • Temperature: 80 °F (27 °C) • Wind: NW 7mph
- Game attendance: 38,728
- Referee: Nolan Dumas
- TV announcers (CBSSN): Dave Ryan (play-by-play) & Donte Whitner (analyst)

Game information

First quarter

- (12:06) FRES – Erik Brooks 40-yard pass from Mikey Keene, Logan Fife two-point run (Drive: 4 plays, 55 yards, 1:38; Fresno State 8–0)
- (10:01) FRES – Elijah Gilliam 32-yard pass from Jaelen Gill, Daniel Lynch kick (Drive: 2 plays, 47 yards, 0:23; Fresno State 15–0)
- (5:48) KENT – Xavier Williams 18-yard run, Andrew Glass kick (Drive: 7 plays, 75 yards, 4:13; Fresno State 15–7)
- (3:07) FRES – Elijah Gilliam 2-yard run, Daniel Lynch kick (Drive: 6 plays, 71 yards, 2:34; Fresno State 22–7)

Second quarter

- (12:16) KENT – Andrew Glass 46-yard field goal (Drive: 13 plays, 57 yards, 5:45; Fresno State 22–10)
- (9:36) FRES – Jalen Moss 12-yard pass from Mikey Keene, Daniel Lynch kick (Drive: 7 plays, 72 yards, 2:32; Fresno State 29–10)
- (0:37) FRES – Elijah Gilliam 1-yard run, Daniel Lynch kick (Drive: 8 plays, 66 yards, 3:22; Fresno State 36–10)

Third quarter

- (9:06) FRES – Tre Watson 2-yard pass from Mikey Keene, Daniel Lynch kick (Drive: 12 plays, 74 yards, 5:46; Fresno State 43–10)
- (1:26) FRES – Jalen Moss 23-yard pass from Mikey Keene, Jalen Moss fumble in endzone recovered by Jaelen Gill, Daniel Lynch kick (Drive: 10 plays, 76 yards, 4:34; Fresno State 50–10)

Fourth quarter

- (10:05) FRES – Dylan Lynch 40-yard field goal (Drive: 9 plays, 31 yards, 4:49; Fresno State 53–10)

Statistics	KENT	FRES
First downs	11	27
Plays–yards	52–231	67–513
Rushes–yards	37–129	33–143
Passing yards	102	370
Passing: comp–att–int	8–15–0	26–34–0
Time of possession	27:39	32:21

Team	Category	Player	Statistics
Kent State	Passing	Michael Alaimo	8/15, 102 yards
Kent State	Rushing	Xavier Williams	15 rushes, 55 yards, TD
Kent State	Receiving	Jameel Gardner, Jr.	2 receptions, 49 yards
Fresno State	Passing	Mikey Keene	24/31, 325 yards, 3 TD
Fresno State	Rushing	Malik Sherrod	10 rushes, 71 yards
Fresno State	Receiving	Jalen Moss	7 receptions, 120 yards, TD

=== Nevada ===
Nevada Wolf Pack at No. 25 Fresno State Bulldogs – Game summary

Quarter	1	2	3	4	Total
Wolf Pack	0	0	0	9	9
No. 25 Bulldogs	7	7	6	7	27

at Valley Children's Stadium • Fresno, California

- Date: September 30
- Game time: 7:30 p.m. PDT
- Game weather: Clear • Temperature: 68 °F (20 °C) • Wind: NW 7mph
- Game attendance: 39,246
- Referee: Patrick Foy
- TV announcers (FS1): Dan Hellie (play-by-play) & Petros Papadakis (analyst)

Game information

First quarter

- (2:12) FRES – Jaelen Gill 65-yard pass from Mikey Keene, Dylan Lynch kick (Drive: 6 plays, 88 yards, 3:30; Fresno State 7–0)

Second quarter

- (4:15) FRES – Malik Sherrod 72-yard run, Dylan Lynch kick (Drive: 5 plays, 97 yards, 2:41; Fresno State 14–0)

Third quarter

- (9:13) FRES – Dylan Lynch 48-yard field goal (Drive: 7 plays, 30 yards, 2:22; Fresno State 17–0)
- (4:51) FRES – Dylan Lynch 40-yard field goal (Drive: 9 plays, 60 yards, 3:27; Fresno State 20–0)

Fourth quarter

- (12:37) FRES – Jaelen Gill 12-yard pass from Mikey Keene, Dylan Lynch kick (Drive: 7 plays, 68 yards, 3:14; Fresno State 27–0)
- (8:22) NEV – Nevada tackles Fresno State running back Elijah Gilliam in end zone for a safety (Fresno State 27–2)
- (0:11) NEV – Spencer Curtis 12-yard pass from AJ Bianco, Brandon Talton kick (Drive: 8 plays, 90 yards, 2:31; Fresno State 27–9)

Statistics	NEV	FRES
First downs	17	19
Plays–yards	66–220	59–410
Rushes–yards	31–53	25–141
Passing yards	167	269
Passing: comp–att–int	19–35–2	26–34–2
Time of possession	30:33	29:27

Team	Category	Player	Statistics
Nevada	Passing	A. J. Bianco	9/14, 97 yards, TD
Nevada	Rushing	Brendon Lewis	15 rushes, 31 yards
Nevada	Receiving	Spencer Curtis	8 receptions, 73 yards, TD
Fresno State	Passing	Mikey Keene	26/34, 269 yards, 2 TD, 2 INT
Fresno State	Rushing	Malik Sherrod	12 rushes, 123 yards, TD
Fresno State	Receiving	Jaelen Gill	8 receptions, 126 yards, 2 TD

=== At Wyoming ===
No. 24 Fresno State Bulldogs at Wyoming Cowboys – Game summary

Quarter	1	2	3	4	Total
No. 24 Bulldogs	0	7	3	9	19
Cowboys	3	21	0	0	24

at War Memorial Stadium • Laramie, Wyoming

- Date: October 7
- Game time: 5:00 p.m. PDT/6:00 p.m. MDT
- Game weather: Sunny • Temperature: 61 °F (16 °C) • Wind: NE 10mph
- Game attendance: 20,788
- Referee: Nolan Dumas
- TV announcers (Fox): Tim Brando (play-by-play) & Spencer Tillman (analyst) & Josh Sims (sideline)

Game information

First quarter

- (6:59) WYO – John Hoyland 34-yard field goal (Drive: 13 plays, 66 yards, 7:16; Wyoming 3–0)

Second quarter

- (14:55) WYO – Wyatt Weiland 14-yard pass from Andrew Peasley, John Hoyland kick (Drive: 10 plays, 78 yards, 5:38; Wyoming 10–0)
- (11:17) FRES – Jalen Moss 6-yard pass from Mikey Keene, Dylan Lynch kick (Drive: 8 plays, 75 yards, 3:38; Wyoming 10–7)
- (6:42) WYO – Wyatt Weiland 4-yard pass from Andrew Peasley, John Hoyland kick (Drive: 8 plays, 75 yards, 4:35; Wyoming 17–7)
- (0:31) WYO – Treyton Welch 12-yard pass from Andrew Peasley, John Hoyland kick (Drive: 11 plays, 88 yards, 2:23; Wyoming 24–7)

Third quarter

- (5:36) FRES – Dylan Lynch 39-yard field goal (Drive: 15 plays, 63 yards, 6:40; Wyoming 24–10)

Fourth quarter

- (8:31) FRES – Dylan Lynch 38-yard field goal (Drive: 10 plays, 54 yards, 3:51; Wyoming 24–13)
- (5:17) FRES – Mac Delena 8-yard pass from Logan Fife, two–point conversion failed (Drive: 7 plays, 48 yards, 3:14; Wyoming 24–19)

Statistics	FRES	WYO
First downs	16	27
Plays–yards	66–324	63–329
Rushes–yards	20–38	35–130
Passing yards	286	199
Passing: comp–att–int	30–46–1	20–28–0
Time of possession	27:48	32:12

Team	Category	Player	Statistics
Fresno State	Passing	Mikey Keene	23/35, 218 yards, TD
Fresno State	Rushing	Malik Sherrod	11 rushes, 48 yards
Fresno State	Receiving	Jalen Moss	9 receptions, 115 yards, TD
Wyoming	Passing	Andrew Peasley	19/27, 183 yards, 3 TD
Wyoming	Rushing	Harrison Waylee	22 rushes, 83 yards
Wyoming	Receiving	Treyton Welch	6 receptions, 74 yards, TD

=== Utah State ===
Game Seven – Fresno State Bulldogs (5–1) at Utah State Aggies (3–3)

Quarter	1	2	3	4	Total
Bulldogs	7	7	14	9	37
Aggies	7	7	3	15	32

at Maverik Stadium • Logan, Utah

- Date: Saturday, October 13, 2023
- Game time: 5:00 p.m. PDT
- Game weather: Cloudy • Temperature: 57 °F (14 °C) • Wind:
- Game attendance: 17,220
- Referee: Christian Watson
- TV announcers (CBSSN): Chris Lewis (play-by-play) & Donte Whitner (analyst)

Game information

First quarter

- (6:19) FRES – Malik Sherrod 5-yard run, Dylan Lynch kick (Drive: 14 plays, 98 yards, 5:19; Fresno State 7–0)
- (3:42) USU – Jalen Royals 29-yard pass from Cooper Legas, Elliott Nimrod kick (Drive: 10 plays, 75 yards, 2:37; Tied 7–7)

Second quarter

- (2:45) FRES – Tre Watson 7-yard pass from Logan Fife, Dylan Lynch kick (Drive: 11 plays, 45 yards, 3:57; Fresno State 14–7)
- (1:00) USU – Jalen Royals 52-yard pass from Cooper Legas, Elliott Nimrod kick (Drive: 7 plays, 75 yards, 1:45; Tied 14–14)

Third quarter

- (11:37) USU – Elliott Nimrod 37-yard field goal (Drive: 8 plays, 55 yards, 3:23; Utah State 17–14)
- (9:51) FRES – Malik Sherrod 46-yard run, Dylan Lynch kick (Drive: 4 plays, 57 yards, 1:45; Fresno State 21–17)
- (4:51) FRES – Tre Watson 7-yard pass from Jaelen Gill, Dylan Lynch kick (Drive: 6 plays, 66 yards, 2:13; Fresno State 28–17)

Fourth quarter

- (14:29) USU – Terrell Vaughn 43-yard pass from Cooper Legas, Jalen Royals two–point run (Drive: 5 plays, 69 yards, 1:16; Fresno State 28–25)
- (9:50) FRES – Dylan Lynch 26-yard field goal (Drive: 10 plays, 64 yards, 4:33; Fresno State 31–25)
- (4:42) USU – Rahsul Faison 24-yard run, Elliott Nimrod kick (Drive: 5 plays, 85 yards, 2:00; Utah State 32–31)
- (2:19) FRES – Malik Sherrod 11-yard run, two–point conversion failed (Drive: 5 plays, 72 yards, 2:16; Fresno State 37–32)

Statistics	FRES	USU
First downs	27	30
Plays–yards	80–461	82–568
Rushes–yards	40–151	42–205
Passing yards	310	363
Passing: comp–att–int	23–40–0	23–40–2
Turnovers		
Time of possession	33:09	26:51

Team	Category	Player	Statistics
Fresno State	Passing	Logan Fife	22/39, 291 yards, TD
Fresno State	Rushing	Malik Sherrod	24 carries, 131 yards, 3 TD
Fresno State	Receiving	Tre Watson	5 receptions, 76 yards, 2 TD
Utah State	Passing	Cooper Legas	23/40, 363 yards, 3 TD, 2 INT
Utah State	Rushing	Rahsul Faison	12 carries, 75 yards, TD
Utah State	Receiving	Jalen Royals	7 receptions, 125 yards, 2 TD

=== UNLV ===
Game Eight – UNLV Rebels (6–1) at Fresno State Bulldogs (6–1)

Quarter	1	2	3	4	Total
Rebels	7	10	0	7	24
Bulldogs	7	0	24	0	31

at Valley Children's Stadium • Fresno, California

- Date: Saturday, October 28, 2023
- Game time: 7:30 p.m. PDT
- Game weather: Clear • Temperature: 58 °F (14 °C) • Wind: SE 5mph
- Game attendance: 41,031
- Referee: Jonathan Noli
- TV announcers (FS1): Alex Faust (play-by-play) & Petros Papadakis (analyst)

Game information

First quarter

- (7:41) FRES – Tim Grear Jr. 31-yard pass from Mikey Keene, Dylan Lynch kick (Drive: 11 plays, 81 yards, 4:58; Fresno State 7–0)
- (2:20) UNLV – Ricky White 41-yard pass from Jayden Maiava, Jose Pizano kick (Drive: 10 plays, 80 yards, 5:19; Tied 7–7)

Second quarter

- (11:51) UNLV – Jose Pizano 30-yard field goal (Drive: 7 plays, 23 yards, 2:08; UNLV 10–7)
- (0:33) UNLV – Jai'Den Thomas 4-yard run, Jose Pizano kick (Drive: 9 plays, 72 yards, 1:16; UNLV 17–7)

Third quarter

- (10:38) FRES – Mac Dalena 2-yard pass from Mikey Keene, Dylan Lynch kick (Drive: 5 plays, 15 yards, 2:34; UNLV 17–14)
- (5:59) FRES – Erik Brooks 10-yard pass from Mikey Keene, Dylan Lynch kick (Drive: 7 plays, 80 yards, 2:54; Fresno State 21–17)
- (2:23) FRES – Dylan Lynch 36-yard field goal (Drive: 5 plays, 23 yards, 1:58; Fresno State 24–17)
- (0:03) FRES – Malik Sherrod 2-yard pass from Mikey Keene, Dylan Lynch kick (Drive: 7 plays, 31 yards, 2:11; Fresno State 31–17)

Fourth quarter

- (12:22) UNLV – Ricky White 15-yard pass from Jayden Maiava, Jose Pizano kick (Drive: 7 plays, 70 yards, 2:38; Fresno State 31–24)

Statistics	UNLV	FRES
First downs	22	15
Plays–yards	78–424	61–312
Rushes–yards	43–156	20–56
Passing yards	268	256
Passing: comp–att–int	21–35–2	27–41–2
Turnovers		
Time of possession	31:14	28:46

Team	Category	Player	Statistics
UNLV	Passing	Jayden Maiava	21/35, 268 yards, 2 TD, 2 INT
UNLV	Rushing	Vincent Davis Jr.	12 carries, 68 yards
UNLV	Receiving	Ricky White	7 receptions, 152 yards, 2 TD
Fresno State	Passing	Mikey Keene	27/41, 256 yards, 4 TD, 2 INT
Fresno State	Rushing	Malik Sherrod	17 carries, 56 yards
Fresno State	Receiving	Jalen Moss	5 receptions, 99 yards

=== Boise State ===
Game Nine – Boise State Broncos (4–4) at Fresno State Bulldogs (7–1)

Quarter	1	2	3	4	Total
Broncos	3	7	7	13	30
Bulldogs	10	10	7	10	37

at Valley Children's Stadium • Fresno, California

- Date: Saturday, November 4, 2023
- Game time: 7:00 p.m. PDT
- Game weather: Clear • Temperature: 73 °F (23 °C) • Wind: N 2mph
- Game attendance: 41,031
- Referee: Nolan Dumas
- TV announcers (CBSSN): Jordan Kent (play-by-play) & Donte Whitner (analyst)

Game information

First quarter

- (12:11) FRES – Tre Watson 25-yard pass from Mikey Keene, Dylan Lynch kick (Drive: 7 plays, 78 yards, 2:44; Fresno State 7–0)
- (7:30) FRES – Dylan Lynch 48-yard field goal (Drive: 9 plays, 35 yards, 3:39; Fresno State 10–0)
- (2:16) BOIS – Jonah Dalmas 45-yard field goal (Drive: 11 plays, 43 yards, 5:07; Fresno State 10–3)

Second quarter

- (7:15) FRES – Dylan Lynch 22-yard field goal (Drive: 10 plays, 68 yards, 1:49; Fresno State 13–3)
- (0:07) BOIS – Billy Bowens 2-yard pass from Maddux Madsen, Jonah Dalmas kick (Drive: 12 plays, 64 yards, 1:37; Fresno State 13–10)
- (0:00) FRES – Malik Sherrod 95-yard kickoff return, Dylan Lynch kick (Fresno State 20–10)

Third quarter

- (6:31) FRES – Elijah Gilliam 1-yard run, Dylan Lynch kick (Drive: 14 plays, 68 yards, 7:25; Fresno State 27–10)
- (3:35) BOIS – George Holani 1-yard run, Jonah Dalmas kick (Drive: 6 plays, 75 yards, 2:56; Fresno State 27–17)

Fourth quarter

- (12:42) BOIS – Jonah Dalmas 38-yard field goal (Drive: 14 plays, 63 yards, 3:45; Fresno State 27–20)
- (10:00) FRES – Dylan Lynch 24-yard field goal (Drive: 6 plays, 55 yards, 2:32; Fresno State 30–20)
- (4:40) BOIS – Maddux Madsen 27-yard run, Jonah Dalmas kick (Drive: 8 plays, 80 yards, 2:04; Fresno State 30–27)
- (1:49) FRES – Malik Sherrod 52-yard run, Dylan Lynch kick (Drive: 7 plays, 75 yards, 2:51; Fresno State 37–27)
- (0:31) BOIS – Jonah Dalmas 52-yard field goal (Drive: 6 plays, 41 yards, 1:13; Fresno State 37–30)

Statistics	BOIS	FRES
First downs	25	23
Plays–yards	80–488	69–441
Rushes–yards	34–177	29–138
Passing yards	311	303
Passing: comp–att–int	24–46–2	25–40–1
Turnovers		
Time of possession	29:38	30:22

Team	Category	Player	Statistics
Boise State	Passing	Maddux Madsen	22/42, 258 yards, TD, INT
Boise State	Rushing	George Holani	19 carries, 79 yards, TD
Boise State	Receiving	Eric McAlister	8 receptions, 85 yards
Fresno State	Passing	Mikey Keene	24/38, 290 yards, TD, INT
Fresno State	Rushing	Malik Sherrod	21 carries, 132 yards, TD
Fresno State	Receiving	Mac Dalena	6 receptions, 85 yards

=== San Jose State ===
Game Ten – Fresno State Bulldogs (8–1) at San Jose State Spartans (4–5)

Quarter	1	2	3	4	Total
Bulldogs	3	7	0	8	18
Spartans	21	7	7	7	42

at CEFCU Stadium • San Jose, California

- Date: Saturday, November 11, 2023
- Game time: 7:30 p.m. PDT
- Game weather: Clear • Temperature: 61 °F (16 °C) • Wind:
- Game attendance: 18,886
- Referee: Christian Watson
- TV announcers (CBSSN): Rich Waltz (play-by-play) & Aaron Taylor (analyst) & Brandon Bishop (sideline)

Game information

First quarter

- (12:34) SJSU – Malikhi Miller 25-yard pass from Chevan Cordeiro, Kyler Halvorsen kick (Drive: 6 plays, 80 yards, 2:26; San Jose State 7–0)
- (6:04) FRES – Daniel Lynch 31-yard field goal (Drive: 15 plays, 60 yards, 6:30; San Jose State 7–3)
- (2:55) SJSU – Isaac Jernagin 7-yard pass from Chevan Cordeiro, Kyler Halvorsen kick (Drive: 7 plays, 60 yards, 3:09; San Jose State 14–3)
- (1:25) SJSU – Kairee Robinson 4-yard run, Kyler Halvorsen kick (Drive: 3 plays, 18 yards, 1:20; San Jose State 21–3)

Second quarter

- (9:55) SJSU – Nick Nash 14-yard pass from Chevan Cordeiro, Kyler Halvorsen kick (Drive: 8 plays, 77 yards, 4:52; San Jose State 28–3)
- (7:57) FRES – Mac Dalena 39-yard pass from Mikey Keene, Daniel Lynch kick (Drive: 7 plays, 72 yards, 1:54; San Jose State 28–10)

Third quarter

- (2:55) SJSU – Michael Dansby 98-yard interception return, Kyler Halvorsen kick (San Jose State 35–10)

Fourth quarter

- (11:07) SJSU – Kairee Robinson 5-yard run, Kyler Halvorsen kick (Drive: 2 plays, 52 yards, 0:55; San Jose State 42–10)
- (9:01) FRES – Jalen Moss 11-yard pass from Logan Fife, Jake Boust–Logan Fife 2-point pass (Drive: 7 plays, 72 yards, 2:01; San Jose State 42–18)

Statistics	FRES	SJSU
First downs	19	21
Plays–yards	72–308	61–459
Rushes–yards	31–83	43–313
Passing yards	225	146
Passing: comp–att–int	23–41–2	9–18–0
Turnovers		
Time of possession	27:40	32:20

Team	Category	Player	Statistics
Fresno State	Passing	Logan Fife	11/21, 115 yards, TD, INT
Fresno State	Rushing	Malik Sherrod	15 carries, 68 yards
Fresno State	Receiving	Mac Dalena	6 receptions, 69 yards, TD
San Jose State	Passing	Chevan Cordeiro	9/18, 146 yards, 3 TD
San Jose State	Rushing	Kairee Robinson	19 carries, 200 yards, 2 TD
San Jose State	Receiving	Nick Nash	4 receptions, 66 yards, TD

=== New Mexico ===
Game Eleven – New Mexico Lobos (3–7) at Fresno State Bulldogs (8–2)

Quarter	1	2	3	4	Total
Lobos	3	9	6	7	25
Bulldogs	7	7	0	3	17

at Valley Children's Stadium • Fresno, California

- Date: Saturday, November 18, 2023
- Game time: 7:30 p.m. PDT
- Game weather: Rain • Temperature: 57 °F (14 °C) • Wind: N 3mph
- Game attendance: 38,569
- Referee: Patrick Foy
- TV announcers (FS1): Jordan Kent (play-by-play) & Will Blackmon (analyst)

Game information

First quarter

- (9:53) UNM – Luke Drzewiecki 38-yard field goal (Drive: 8 plays, 45 yards, 5:07; New Mexico 3–0)
- (6:05) FRES – Logan Fife 1-yard run, Dylan Lynch kick (Drive: 8 plays, 77 yards, 3:42; Fresno State 7–3)

Second quarter

- (11:06) FRES – Malik Sherrod 6-yard run, Dylan Lynch kick (Drive: 7 plays, 78 yards, 3:07; Fresno State 14–3)
- (6:08) UNM – Luke Drzewiecki 38-yard field goal (Drive: 11 plays, 54 yards, 4:58; Fresno State 14–6)
- (2:19) UNM – Jacory Croskey-Merritt 50-yard run, two-point pass failed (Drive: 4 plays, 92 yards, 2:08; Fresno State 14–12)

Third quarter

- (2:30) UNM – Jacory Croskey-Merritt 10-yard run, two-point pass failed (Drive: 10 plays, 93 yards, 5:25; New Mexico 18–14)

Fourth quarter

- (8:57) UNM – Caleb Medford 33-yard pass from Devon Dampier, Luke Drzewiecki kick (Drive: 10 plays, 97 yards, 5:53; New Mexico 25–14)
- (3:25) FRES – Dylan Lynch 44-yard field goal (Drive: 15 plays, 63 yards, 1:57; New Mexico 25–17)

Statistics	UNM	FRES
First downs	26	13
Plays–yards	72–528	49–235
Rushes–yards	51–345	19–34
Passing yards	183	195
Passing: comp–att–int	10–21–2	18–32–0
Turnovers		
Time of possession	39:05	20:55

Team	Category	Player	Statistics
New Mexico	Passing	Dylan Hopkins	8/18, 124 yards, 2 INT
New Mexico	Rushing	Jacory Croskey-Merritt	21 carries, 209 yards, 2 TD
New Mexico	Receiving	Caleb Medford	6 receptions, 122 yards, TD
Fresno State	Passing	Logan Fife	9/15, 137 yards
Fresno State	Rushing	Malik Sherrod	13 carries, 50 yards, TD
Fresno State	Receiving	Jalen Moss	1 reception, 53 yards

=== San Diego State ===
Game Twelve – Fresno State Bulldogs (8–3) at San Diego State Aztecs (3–8)

Quarter	1	2	3	4	Total
Bulldogs	7	3	0	8	18
Aztecs	3	13	7	10	33

at Snapdragon Stadium • San Diego, California

- Date: Saturday, November 25, 2023
- Game time: 7:30 p.m. PDT
- Game weather: Clear • Temperature: 55 °F (13 °C) • Wind: 0mph
- Referee: Michael Cuttone
- TV announcers (FS1): Guy Haberman (play-by-play) & Will Blackmon (analyst)

Game information

First quarter

- (9:19) FRES – Malik Sherrod 62-yard run, Dylan Lynch kick (Drive: 5 plays, 86 yards, 1:32; Fresno State 7–0)
- (5:12) SDSU – Jake Browning 32-yard field goal (Drive: 10 plays, 62 yards, 4:03; Fresno State 7–3)

Second quarter

- (14:56) SDSU – Jake Browning 39-yard field goal (Drive: 8 plays, 12 yards, 4:06; Fresno State 7–6)
- (8:03) SDSU – Jalen Mayden 70-yard run, Jake Browning kick (Drive: 5 plays, 91 yards, 2:03; San Diego State 13–7)
- (2:58) SDSU – Jake Browning 41-yard field goal (Drive: 6 plays, 24 yards, 2:59; San Diego State 16–7)
- (0:00) FRES – Dylan Lynch 43-yard field goal (Drive: 8 plays, 48 yards, 0:45; San Diego State 16–10)

Third quarter

- (8:55) SDSU – Jaylon Armstead 1-yard run, Jake Browning kick (Drive: 9 plays, 51 yards, 4:35; San Diego State 23–10)

Fourth quarter

- (14:14) SDSU – Jake Browning 33-yard field goal (Drive: 14 plays, 59 yards, 7:23; San Diego State 26–10)
- (10:08) FRES – Malik Sherrod 1-yard run, two-point pass (Drive: 10 plays, 75 yards, 4:06; San Diego State 26–18)
- (2:54) SDSU – Leo Kemp 5-yard pass from Jalen Mayden, Jake Browning kick (Drive: 14 plays, 78 yards, 7:06; San Diego State 33–18)

Statistics	FRES	SDSU
First downs	17	21
Plays–yards	56–341	79–415
Rushes–yards	19–151	53–226
Passing yards	190	189
Passing: comp–att–int	21–37–1	17–26–0
Turnovers		
Time of possession	19:09	40:51

Team	Category	Player	Statistics
Fresno State	Passing	Mikey Keene	21/36, 190 yards, INT
Fresno State	Rushing	Malik Sherrod	15 carries 138 yards, 2 TD
Fresno State	Receiving	Erik Brooks	5 receptions, 53 yards
San Diego State	Passing	Jalen Mayden	17/26, 189 yards, TD
San Diego State	Rushing	Jalen Mayden	14 carries, 96 yards, TD
San Diego State	Receiving	Cameron Harpole	3 receptions, 46 yards

=== Vs. New Mexico State (New Mexico Bowl) ===
Game Thirteen – New Mexico State Aggies (10–4) vs. Fresno State Bulldogs (8–4)

Quarter	1	2	3	4	Total
Aggies	0	3	7	0	10
Bulldogs	10	7	3	17	37

at University Stadium • Albuquerque, New Mexico

- Date: Saturday, December 16, 2023
- Game time: 2:45 p.m. PDT
- Game weather: Clear • Temperature: 12 °F (−11 °C) • Wind:
- TV announcers (ESPN): Clay Matvick (play-by-play) & Rod Gilmore (analyst)

Game information

First quarter

- (6:17) FRES – Dylan Lynch 32-yard field goal (Drive: 7 plays, 61 yards, 3:37; Fresno State 3–0)
- (3:26) FRES – Josiah Freeman 26-yard pass from Mikey Keene, (Dylan Lynch kick) (Drive: 3 plays, 40 yards, 1:35; Fresno State 10–0)

Second quarter

- (10:47) NMSU – Ethan Albertson 45-yard field goal (Drive: 4 plays, 5 yards, 1:26; Fresno State 10–3)
- (7:02) FRES – Jaelen Gill 23-yard pass from Mikey Keene, (Dylan Lynch kick) (Drive: 7 plays, 82 yards, 3:45; Fresno State 17–3)

Third quarter

- (11:50) FRES – Dylan Lynch 25-yard field goal (Drive: 9 plays, 68 yards, 3:10; Fresno State 20–3)
- (4:23) NMSU – Diego Pavia 14-yard run, (Ethan Albertson kick) (Drive: 14 plays, 75 yards, 7:27; Fresno State 20–10)

Fourth quarter

- (13:20) FRES – Mikey Keene 4-yard run, (Dylan Lynch kick) (Drive: 13 plays, 75 yards, 6:05; Fresno State 27–10)
- (7:08) FRES – Dylan Lynch 38-yard field goal (Drive: 9 plays, 44 yards, 4:25; Fresno State 30–10)
- (4:40) FRES – Jalen Moss 9-yard pass from Mikey Keene, (Dylan Lynch kick) (Drive: 4 plays, 32 yards, 1:52; Fresno State 37–10)

Statistics	NMST	FRES
First downs	13	22
Plays–yards	60–200	65–491
Rushes–yards	35–142	25–111
Passing yards	58	380
Passing: comp–att–int	11–25–1	31–40–1
Turnovers		
Time of possession	28:38	31:21

Team	Category	Player	Statistics
New Mexico State	Passing	Diego Pavia	11/25, 58 yards, INT
New Mexico State	Rushing	Diego Pavia	18 carries, 72 yards, TD
New Mexico State	Receiving	Eli Stowers	3 receptions, 20 yards
Fresno State	Passing	Mikey Keene	31/39, 380 yards, 3 TD, INT
Fresno State	Rushing	Malik Sherrod	20 carries, 90 yards
Fresno State	Receiving	Malik Sherrod	8 receptions, 81 yards

== Rankings ==
Ranking movements Legend: ██ Increase in ranking ██ Decrease in ranking — = Not ranked RV = Received votes
	Week															
Poll	Pre	1	2	3	4	5	6	7	8	9	10	11	12	13	14	Final
AP	—	RV	RV	RV	25	24	RV	RV	RV	RV	RV	RV	RV	—	—	
Coaches	RV	RV	RV	RV	RV	24	RV	RV	RV	RV	25	RV	RV	—	—	
CFP	Not released									—	—	—	—	—	—	Not released
