= 2024 Fresno State Bulldogs football team =

American college football season

2024 Fresno State Bulldogs football

Famous Idaho Potato Bowl, L 20–28^{2OT} vs. Northern Illinois
- Conference: Mountain West Conference
- Record: 6–7 (4–3 MW)
- Head coach: Tim Skipper (interim; 1st season)
- Offensive coordinator: Pat McCann (2nd season)
- Offensive scheme: Multiple
- Defensive coordinator: Kevin Coyle (7th season)
- Base defense: 4–3
- Home stadium: Valley Children's Stadium

2024 Mountain West Conference football standings
| | Conf. | | | Overall |
| Team | W | | L | W | | L |
|---|---|---|---|---|---|---|
| No. 8 Boise State y$^ | 7 | – | 0 | 12 | – | 2 |
| No. 23 UNLV y | 6 | – | 1 | 11 | – | 3 |
| Colorado State | 6 | – | 1 | 8 | – | 5 |
| Fresno State | 4 | – | 3 | 6 | – | 7 |
| San Jose State | 3 | – | 4 | 7 | – | 6 |
| Air Force | 3 | – | 4 | 5 | – | 7 |
| Hawaii | 3 | – | 4 | 5 | – | 7 |
| New Mexico | 3 | – | 4 | 5 | – | 7 |
| Utah State | 3 | – | 4 | 4 | – | 8 |
| San Diego State | 2 | – | 5 | 3 | – | 9 |
| Wyoming | 2 | – | 5 | 3 | – | 9 |
| Nevada | 0 | – | 7 | 3 | – | 10 |
Championship: Boise State 21, UNLV 7
^ – College Football Playoff participant; $ – Conference champion; y – Championship game participant; Rankings from AP Poll

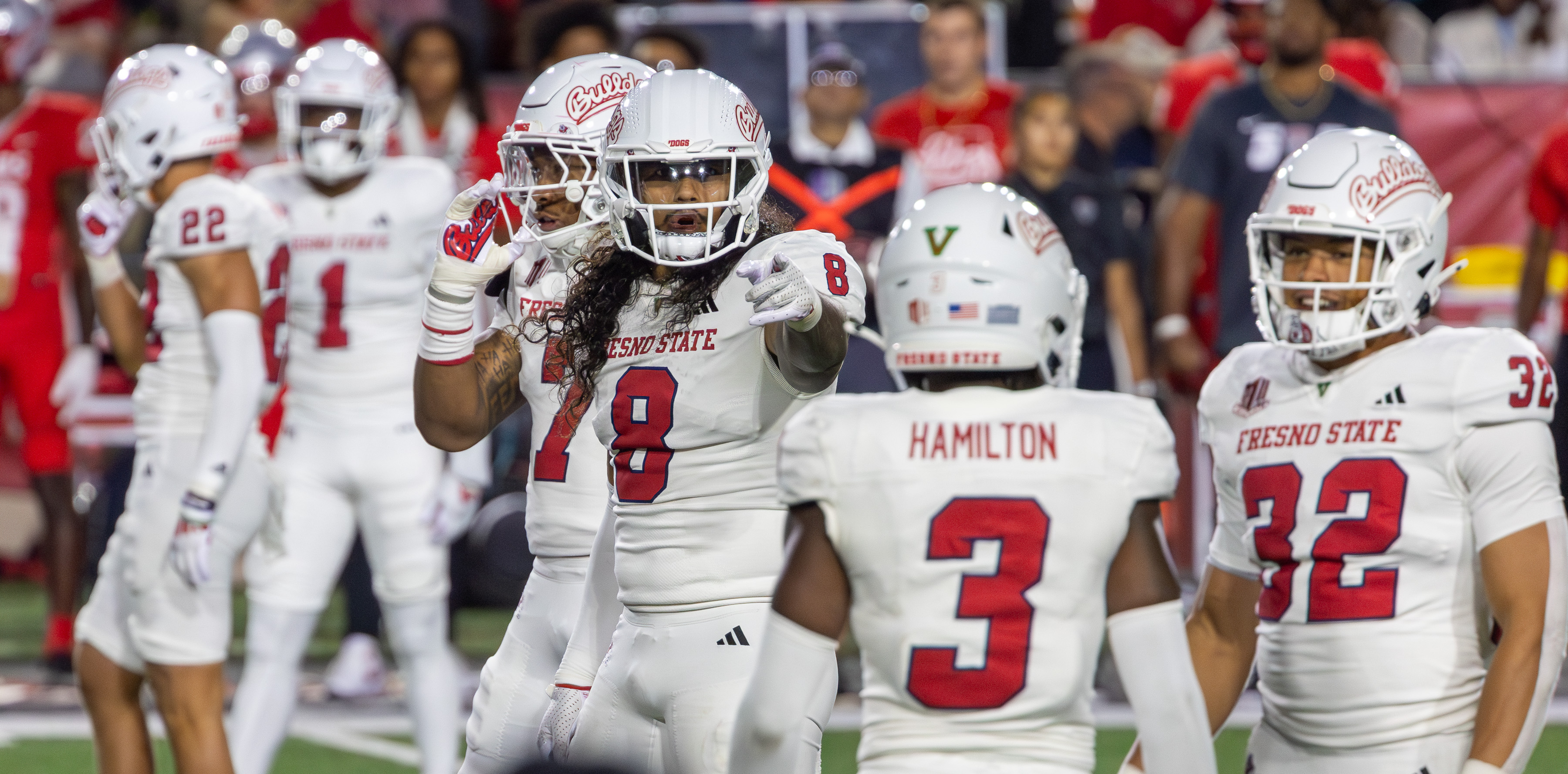
2024 players Phoenix Jackson, Tuasivi Nomura (pointing), Al'zillion Hamilton, and Dean Clark

The 2024 Fresno State Bulldogs football team represented California State University, Fresno as a member of the Mountain West Conference during the 2024 NCAA Division I FBS football season. The Bulldogs were led by interim head coach Tim Skipper in his first overall season with the program. Jeff Tedford stepped down on July 14, 2024 due to health concerns. The Bulldogs played their home games at Valley Children's Stadium on the university's Fresno, California campus.

== Schedule ==
| Date | Time | Opponent | Site | TV | Result | Attendance |
|---|---|---|---|---|---|---|
| August 31 | 4:30 p.m. | at No. 9 Michigan* | Michigan Stadium; Ann Arbor, MI | NBC | L 10–30 | 110,665 |
| September 7 | 7:00 p.m. | No. 8 (FCS) Sacramento State* | Valley Children's Stadium; Fresno, CA | KGPE | W 46–30 | 41,031 |
| September 14 | 7:30 p.m. | New Mexico State* | Valley Children's Stadium; Fresno, CA | TruTV | W 48–0 | 39,079 |
| September 21 | 5:30 p.m. | at New Mexico | University Stadium; Albuquerque, NM | TruTV | W 38–21 | 18,019 |
| September 28 | 12:30 p.m. | at UNLV | Allegiant Stadium; Las Vegas, NV | FS1 | L 14–59 | 24,638 |
| October 12 | 4:00 p.m. | Washington State* | Valley Children's Stadium; Fresno, CA | FS1 | L 17–25 | 41,031 |
| October 18 | 7:30 p.m. | at Nevada | Mackay Stadium; Reno, NV | CBSSN | W 24–21 | 18,319 |
| October 26 | 5:00 p.m. | San Jose State^{†} | Valley Children's Stadium; Fresno, CA (rivalry) | TruTV | W 33–10 | 41,343 |
| November 2 | 4:00 p.m. | Hawaii | Valley Children's Stadium; Fresno, CA (rivalry) | SPEC PPV/KGPE | L 20–21 | 41,575 |
| November 9 | 6:45 p.m. | at Air Force | Falcon Stadium; Colorado Springs, CO | FS1 | L 28–36 | 14,794 |
| November 23 | 7:30 p.m. | Colorado State | Valley Children's Stadium; Fresno, CA | CBSSN | W 28–22 | 39,543 |
| November 30 | 12:30 p.m. | at UCLA* | Rose Bowl; Pasadena, CA | BTN | L 13–20 | 35,018 |
| December 23 | 11:30 a.m. | vs. Northern Illinois | Albertsons Stadium; Boise, ID (Famous Idaho Potato Bowl) | ESPN | L 20–28 ^{2OT} | 10,359 |
*Non-conference game; ^{†}Homecoming; Rankings from AP Poll (and CFP Rankings, after October 31) - Released prior to game; All times are in Pacific time

== Game summaries ==
=== at No. 9 Michigan ===
Fresno State Bulldogs (0–0) at No. 9 Michigan Wolverines (0–0) – Game summary

| Quarter | 1 | 2 | 3 | 4 | Total |
|---|---|---|---|---|---|
| Bulldogs | 0 | 3 | 0 | 7 | 10 |
| No. 9 Wolverines | 7 | 3 | 3 | 17 | 30 |

at Michigan Stadium • Ann Arbor, MI

- Date: August 31, 2024
- Game time: 4:30 p.m. PT
- Game weather: 72 °F (22 °C), sunny, NE 5 miles per hour (8.0 km/h)
- Game attendance: 110,665
- Referee: Jeff Servinski
- TV announcers (NBC): Noah Eagle (play-by-play), Todd Blackledge (color commentator), and Kathryn Tappen (sideline reporter)

Game information

First quarter

- (11:03) MICH – Donovan Edwards 3-yard pass from Alex Orji, Dominic Zvada kick (Drive: 5 plays, 31 yards, 2:28; Michigan 7–0)

Second quarter

- (7:35) FRES – Dylan Lynch 41-yard field goal (Drive: 8 plays, 38 yards, 3:23; Michigan 7–3)
- (0:31) MICH – Dominic Zvada 45-yard field goal (Drive: 11 plays, 47 yards, 6:56; Michigan 10–3)

Third quarter

- (9:21) MICH – Dominic Zvada 53-yard field goal (Drive: 10 plays, 38 yards, 5:32; Michigan 13–3)

Fourth quarter

- (12:42) MICH – Dominic Zvada 55-yard field goal (Drive: 9 plays, 26 yards, 3:28; Michigan 16–3)
- (10:06) FRES – Raylen Sharpe 19-yard pass from Mikey Keene, Dylan Lynch kick (Drive: 7 plays, 75 yards, 2:36; Michigan 16–10)
- (5:43) MICH – Colston Loveland 18-yard pass from Davis Warren, Dominic Zvada kick (Drive: 7 plays, 75 yards, 4:17; Michigan 23–10)
- (3:57) MICH – Will Johnson 86-yard interception return, Dominic Zvada kick (Michigan 30–10)

| Statistics | FRES | MICH |
|---|---|---|
| First downs | 17 | 18 |
| Total yards | 247 | 269 |
| Rushing yards | 9 | 148 |
| Passing yards | 238 | 121 |
| Passing: Comp–Att–Int | 22–36–2 | 16–27–1 |
| Time of possession | 26:00 | 34:00 |

| Team | Category | Player | Statistics |
|---|---|---|---|
| Fresno State | Passing | Mikey Keene | 22/36, 238 yards, TD, 2 INT |
| Fresno State | Rushing | Malik Sherrod | 14 carries, 24 yards |
| Fresno State | Receiving | Jalen Moss | 6 receptions, 97 yards |
| Michigan | Passing | Davis Warren | 15/25, 118 yards, TD, INT |
| Michigan | Rushing | Kalel Mullings | 15 carries, 92 yards |
| Michigan | Receiving | Colston Loveland | 8 receptions, 87 yards, TD |

=== vs. No. 8 (FCS) Sacramento State ===
Game Two – No. 8 (FCS) Sacramento State Hornets (0–1) vs Fresno State Bulldogs (0–1) – Game summary

| Quarter | 1 | 2 | 3 | 4 | Total |
|---|---|---|---|---|---|
| No. 8 (FCS) Hornets | 3 | 7 | 7 | 13 | 30 |
| Bulldogs | 18 | 7 | 14 | 7 | 46 |

at Valley Children's Stadium • Fresno, CA

- Date: Saturday September 7, 2024
- Game time: 7:00 PM PST
- Game weather: 89 °F (32 °C)
- Game attendance: 41,031
- Referee: Michael Cuttone
- TV announcers (KGPE): Scott Bemis (play-by-play) and Marcus McMaryion (analyst)

Game information

First quarter

- (14:50) FRES – Mac Dalena 75-yard pass from Mikey Keene, Jayden Mandel two-point run (Drive: 1 play, 75 yards, 0:10; Fresno State 8–0)
- (11:02) SAC – Zach Schreiner 34-yard field goal (Drive: 4 plays, 3 yards, 1:08; Fresno State 8–3)
- (8:12) FRES – Jalen Moss 85-yard punt return, Dylan Lynch kick (Fresno State 15–3)
- (7:13) FRES – Dylan Lynch 32-yard field goal (Drive: 4 plays, 6 yards, 0:53; Fresno State 18–3)

Second quarter

- (12:49) FRES – Malik Sherrod 2-yard run, Dylan Lynch kick (Drive: 8 plays, 80 yards, 2:57; Fresno State 25–3)
- (5:53) SAC – Jared Gipson 78-yard pass from Kaiden Bennett, Zach Schreiner kick (Drive: 2 plays, 80 yards, 0:43; Fresno State 25–10)

Third quarter

- (12:25) SAC – Ezra Moleni 13-yard pass from Carson Conklin, Zach Schreiner kick (Drive: 7 plays, 75 yards, 2:35; Fresno State 25–17)
- (3:32) FRES – Tyler Mello 1-yard pass from Mikey Keene, Dylan Lynch kick (Drive: 13 plays, 75 yards, 6:13; Fresno State 32–17)
- (1:05) FRES – Malik Sherrod 1-yard run, Dylan Lynch kick (Drive: 4 plays, 50 yards, 1:31; Fresno State 39–17)

Fourth quarter

- (11:43) SAC – Austin Jarrard 3-yard pass from Carson Conklin, two-point conversion failed (Drive: 13 plays, 75 yards, 4:22; Fresno State 39–23)
- (8:06) FRES – Joshua Wood 10-yard run, Dylan Lynch kick (Drive: 7 plays, 75 yards, 3:37; Fresno State 46–23)
- (6:51) SAC – Anderson Grover 36-yard pass from Carson Conklin, Zach Schreiner kick (Drive: 3 plays, 75 yards, 1:15; Fresno State 46–30)

| Statistics | SAC | FRES |
|---|---|---|
| First downs | 20 | 22 |
| Total yards | 469 | 513 |
| Rushing yards | 115 | 155 |
| Passing yards | 354 | 358 |
| Passing: Comp–Att–Int | 25–50–1 | 24–35–2 |
| Time of possession | 25:27 | 34:33 |

| Team | Category | Player | Statistics |
|---|---|---|---|
| Sacramento State | Passing | Carson Conklin | 20/37, 219 yards, 3 TD |
| Sacramento State | Rushing | Elijah Tau-Tolliver | 14 carries, 74 yards |
| Sacramento State | Receiving | Jared Gipson | 5 receptions, 138 yards, TD |
| Fresno State | Passing | Mikey Keene | 23/34, 356 yards, 2 TD, 2 INT |
| Fresno State | Rushing | Malik Sherrod | 22 carries, 54 yards, 2 TD |
| Fresno State | Receiving | Mac Dalena | 7 receptions, 235 yards, TD |

=== vs New Mexico State ===
New Mexico State Aggies (1-1) vs Fresno State Bulldogs (1-1) – Game summary

| Quarter | 1 | 2 | 3 | 4 | Total |
|---|---|---|---|---|---|
| Aggies | 0 | 0 | 0 | 0 | 0 |
| Bulldogs | 14 | 17 | 17 | 0 | 48 |

at Valley Children's Stadium • Fresno, CA

- Date: September 14, 2024
- Game time: 7:30 p.m. PST
- Game weather: Sunny, 90 °F (32 °C)
- Game attendance: 39,079
- Referee: Christian Watson
- TV announcers (TruTV): J. B. Long (play-by-play) and Mike Golic Jr. (analyst)

Game information

First quarter

- (12:04) FRES – Mac Dalena 69-yard pass from Mikey Keene, Dylan Lynch kick (Drive: 2 plays, 72 yards, 0:39; Fresno State 7–0)
- (9:55) FRES – Elijah Gilliam 4-yard run, Dylan Lynch kick (Drive: 2 plays, 70 yards, 0:18; Fresno State 14–0)

Second quarter

- (11:08) FRES – Malik Sherrod 7-yard run, Dylan Lynch kick (Drive: 6 plays, 68 yards, 2:54; Fresno State 21–0)
- (4:20) FRES – Mac Dalena 13-yard pass from Mikey Keene, Dylan Lynch kick (Drive: 6 plays, 81 yards, 2:15; Fresno State 28–0)
- (0:59) FRES – Dylan Lynch 36-yard field goal (Drive: 9 plays, 53 yards, 2:19; Fresno State 31–0)

Third quarter

- (12:14) FRES – Elijah Gilliam 1-yard run, Dylan Lynch kick (Drive: 6 plays, 75 yards, 2:46; Fresno State 38–0)
- (9:44) FRES – Dylan Lynch 40-yard field goal (Drive: 4 plays, 5 yards, 1:30; Fresno State 41–0)
- (5:15) FRES – Joshua Wood 2-yard run, Dylan Lynch kick (Drive: 8 plays, 45 yards, 3:29; Fresno State 48–0)

Fourth quarter

- No scoring plays.

| Statistics | NMSU | FRES |
|---|---|---|
| First downs | 11 | 20 |
| Total yards | 138 | 525 |
| Rushing yards | 77 | 281 |
| Passing yards | 61 | 244 |
| Passing: Comp–Att–Int | 11–29–3 | 14–25–0 |
| Time of possession | 30:00 | 30:00 |

| Team | Category | Player | Statistics |
|---|---|---|---|
| New Mexico State | Passing | Parker Awad | 6/15, 48 yards, INT |
| New Mexico State | Rushing | Seth McGowan | 11 carries, 47 yards |
| New Mexico State | Receiving | Jordan Smith | 2 receptions, 31 yards |
| Fresno State | Passing | Mikey Keene | 12/22, 221 yards, 2 TD |
| Fresno State | Rushing | Malik Sherrod | 15 carries, 113 yards, TD |
| Fresno State | Receiving | Mac Dalena | 2 receptions, 82 yards, 2 TD |

=== at New Mexico ===
Game Four – Fresno State Bulldogs (2–1) at New Mexico Lobos (0–3) – Game summary

| Quarter | 1 | 2 | 3 | 4 | Total |
|---|---|---|---|---|---|
| Bulldogs | 8 | 17 | 3 | 10 | 38 |
| Lobos | 3 | 7 | 0 | 11 | 21 |

at University Stadium, Albuquerque, New Mexico

- Date: Saturday September 21, 2024
- Game time: 6:30 p.m. MDT
- Game weather: Cloudy • Temperature: 71 °F (22 °C) • Wind: NW 16 mph
- Game attendance: 18,019
- Referee: Cal McNeill
- TV announcers (TruTV): Ari Wolfe (play-by-play) and Darius Walker (sideline)

Game information

First quarter

- (8:37) FRES – Josiah Freeman 5-yard pass from Mikey Keene, Jayden Mandel two-point run (Drive: 10 plays, 39 yards, 4:55; Fresno State 8–0)
- (2:20) UNM – Luke Drzewiecki 20-yard field goal (Drive: 14 plays, 73 yards, 6:09; Fresno State 8–3)

Second quarter

- (11:10) FRES – Bryson Donelson 1-yard run, Dylan Lynch kick (Drive: 11 plays, 75 yards, 6:10; Fresno State 15–3)
- (5:03) FRES – Dylan Lynch 36-yard field goal (Drive: 9 plays, 58 yards, 4:25; Fresno State 18–3)
- (1:24) FRES – Kamron Beachem 26-yard pass from Raylen Sharpe, Dylan Lynch kick (Drive: 4 plays, 58 yards, 0:40; Fresno State 25–3)
- (0:06) UNM – Trace Bruckler 5-yard pass from Devon Dampier, Luke Drzewiecki kick (Drive: 11 plays, 93 yards, 1:12; Fresno State 25–10)

Third quarter

- (4:41) FRES – Dylan Lynch 42-yard field goal (Drive: 14 plays, 57 yards, 7:45; Fresno State 28–10)

Fourth quarter

(12:12) UNM – Luke Drzweiecki 32-yard field goal (Drive: 11 plays, 65 yards, 5:34; Fresno State 28–13) (7:08) FRES – Elijah Gilliam 1-yard run, Dylan Lynch kick (Drive: 5 plays, 12 yards, 1:59; Fresno State 35–13) (3:45) UNM – Javen Jacobs 1-yard run, James Laubstein two-point run (Drive: 9 plays, 75 yards, 3:23; Fresno State 35–21) (1:57) FRES – Dylan Lynch 31-yard field goal (Drive: 6 plays, 28 yards, 1:16; Fresno State 38–21)

| Statistics | FRES | UNM |
|---|---|---|
| First downs | 21 | 25 |
| Total yards | 345 | 485 |
| Rushing yards | 93 | 147 |
| Passing yards | 252 | 338 |
| Turnovers | 0 | 3 |
| Time of possession | 31:17 | 28:43 |

| Team | Category | Player | Statistics |
|---|---|---|---|
| Fresno State | Passing | Mikey Keene | 26/33, 226 yards, TD |
| Fresno State | Rushing | Elijah Gilliam | 18 carries, 54 yards, TD |
| Fresno State | Receiving | Raylen Sharpe | 6 receptions, 49 yards |
| New Mexico | Passing | Devon Dampier | 33/53, 338 yards, TD, 2 INT |
| New Mexico | Rushing | Devon Dampier | 9 carries, 67 yards |
| New Mexico | Receiving | Luke Wysong | 10 receptions, 126 yards |

=== at UNLV ===
Game Five – Fresno State Bulldogs (3–1) at UNLV Rebels (3–0) – Game summary

| Quarter | 1 | 2 | 3 | 4 | Total |
|---|---|---|---|---|---|
| Bulldogs | 0 | 0 | 7 | 7 | 14 |
| Rebels | 14 | 7 | 10 | 28 | 59 |

at Allegiant Stadium • Paradise, NV

- Date: September 28, 2024
- Game time: 12:30 p.m.
- Game weather: None (Indoor stadium)
- Game attendance: 24,638
- Referee: Jonathan Noli
- TV announcers (FS1): Chris Vosters (play-by-play) and Charles Arbuckle (analyst)

Game information

First quarter

- (6:20) UNLV – Hajj-Malik Williams 6-yard run, Caden Chittenden kick (Drive: 3 plays, 29 yards, 1:07; UNLV 7–0)
- (0:27) UNLV – Ricky White III 13-yard blocked punt return, Caden Chittenden kick (UNLV 14–0)

Second quarter

- (1:57) UNLV – Ricky White III 12-yard pass from Hajj-Malik Williams, Caden Chittenden kick (Drive: 7 plays, 42 yards, 3:23; UNLV 21–0)

Third quarter

- (12:48) UNLV – Kaleo Ballungay 17-yard pass from Hajj-Malik Williams, Caden Chittenden kick (Drive: 5 plays, 75 yards, 2:12; UNLV 28–0)
- (6:52) UNLV – Cam Chittenden 45-yard field goal (Drive: 6 plays, 33 yards, 3:14; UNLV 31–0)
- (2:33) FRES – Malik Sherrod 6-yard run, Dylan Lynch kick (Drive: 10 plays, 66 yards, 4:13; UNLV 31–7)

Fourth quarter

- (14:52) UNLV – Ricky White III 15-yard pass from Hajj-Malik Williams, Caden Chittenden kick (Drive: 6 plays, 68 yards, 2:35; UNLV 38–7)
- (11:04) UNLV – Jai'Den Thomas 7-yard run, Caden Chittenden kick (Drive: 5 plays, 66 yards, 1:51; UNLV 45–7)
- (6:36) FRES – Mac Dalena 9-yard pass from Mikey Keene, Dylan Lynch kick (Drive: 10 plays, 75 yards, 4:28; UNLV 45–14)
- (6:24) UNLV – Jai'Den Thomas 90-yard kickoff return, Caden Chittenden kick (UNLV 52–14)
- (3:10) UNLV – Cameron Friel 1-yard run, Caden Chittenden kick (Drive: 5 plays, 25 yards, 2:36; UNLV 59–14)

| Statistics | FRES | UNLV |
|---|---|---|
| First downs | 24 | 25 |
| Total yards | 346 | 450 |
| Rushing yards | 30 | 252 |
| Passing yards | 316 | 198 |
| Passing: Comp–Att–Int | 28–45–4 | 14–17–0 |
| Time of possession | 33:32 | 24:39 |

| Team | Category | Player | Statistics |
|---|---|---|---|
| Fresno State | Passing | Mikey Keene | 27/41, 316 yards, TD, 2 INT |
| Fresno State | Rushing | Jonathan Arceneaux | 4 carries, 30 yards |
| Fresno State | Receiving | Raylen Sharpe | 10 receptions, 116 yards |
| UNLV | Passing | Hajj-Malik Williams | 13/16, 182 yards, 3 TD |
| UNLV | Rushing | Hajj-Malik Williams | 12 carries, 119 yards, TD |
| UNLV | Receiving | Ricky White III | 10 receptions, 127 yards, 2 TD |

=== vs Washington State ===
Game Six – Washington State Cougars (4–1) vs Fresno State Bulldogs (3–2) – Game summary

| Quarter | 1 | 2 | 3 | 4 | Total |
|---|---|---|---|---|---|
| Cougars | 13 | 0 | 3 | 9 | 25 |
| Bulldogs | 7 | 0 | 7 | 3 | 17 |

at Valley Children's Stadium • Fresno, CA

- Date: October 12, 2024
- Game time: 4:00 p.m.
- Game weather: Sunny
- Game attendance: 41,031
- Referee: Christian Watson
- TV announcers (FS1): Trent Rush (play-by-play) and Petros Papadakis (analyst)

Game information

First quarter

- (9:13) WSU – John Mateer 1-yard run, Two–point pass failed (Drive: 13 plays, 75 yards, 5:47; Washington State 6–0)
- (4:23) FRES – Josiah Freeman 34-yard pass from Mikey Keene, Dylan Lynch kick (Drive: 10 plays, 77 yards, 4:44; Fresno State 7–6)
- (0:34) WSU – Kris Hutson 2-yard run, Dean Janikowski kick (Drive: 8 plays, 75 yards, 3:49; Washington State 13–7)

Second quarter

No scoring plays

Third quarter

- (7:26) FRES – Elijah Gilliam 6-yard run, Dylan Lynch kick (Drive: 4 plays, 33 yards, 2:20; Fresno State 14–13)
- (5:16) WSU – Dean Janikowski 34-yard field goal (Drive: 13 plays, 58 yards, 2:10; Washington State 16–14)

Fourth quarter

- (10:13) FRES – Dylan Lynch 27-yard field goal (Drive: 13 plays, 66 yards, 6:40; Fresno State 17–16)
- (6:52) WSU – Ethan O'Connor 60-yard interception return, Two–run failed (Washington State 22–17)
- (1:46) WSU – Dean Janikowski 23-yard field goal (Drive: 8 plays, 40 yards, 2:58; Washington State 25–17)

| Statistics | WSU | FRES |
|---|---|---|
| First downs | 23 | 22 |
| Total yards | 295 | 338 |
| Rushing yards | 123 | 118 |
| Passing yards | 172 | 220 |
| Passing: Comp–Att–Int | 17–35–1 | 24–36–2 |
| Time of possession | 30:40 | 29:20 |

| Team | Category | Player | Statistics |
|---|---|---|---|
| Washington State | Passing | John Mateer | 17/35, 172 yards, INT |
| Washington State | Rushing | Wayshawn Parker | 12 carries, 63 yards |
| Washington State | Receiving | Kyle Williams | 3 receptions, 39 yards |
| Fresno State | Passing | Mikey Keene | 24/36, 220 yards, TD, 2 INT |
| Fresno State | Rushing | Elijah Gilliam | 20 carries, 120 yards, TD |
| Fresno State | Receiving | Mac Dalena | 4 receptions, 61 yards |

=== at Nevada ===
Game Seven – Fresno State Bulldogs (3–3) at Nevada Wolf Pack (3–4) – Game summary

| Quarter | 1 | 2 | 3 | 4 | Total |
|---|---|---|---|---|---|
| Bulldogs | 3 | 14 | 7 | 0 | 24 |
| Wolf Pack | 7 | 14 | 0 | 0 | 21 |

at Mackay Stadium • Reno, NV

- Date: Friday October 18, 2024
- Game time: 10:30 PM EST
- Game weather: Clear • Temperature: 44 °F (7 °C) • Wind: SW at 7 miles per hour (11 km/h)
- Game attendance: 18,319
- Referee: Jonathan Noli
- TV announcers (CBSSN): John Sadak (play-by-play) and Taylor McHargue (analyst)

Game information

First quarter

- (11:03) NEV – Savion Red 3-yard run, Matthew Killam kick (Drive: 6 plays, 75 yards, 3:57; Nevada 7–0)
- (5:42) FRES – Dylan Lynch 44-yard field goal (Drive: 10 plays, 49 yards, 5:21; Nevada 7–3)

Second quarter

- (12:32) FRES – Elijah Gilliam 10-yard run, Dylan Lynch kick (Drive: 12 plays, 86 yards, 5:33; Fresno State 10–7)
- (9:49) NEV – Nate Burleson II 46-yard pass from Brendon Lewis, Matthew Killam kick (Drive: 4 plays, 68 yards, 2:25; Nevada 14–10)
- (5:45) FRES – Elijah Gilliam 4-yard run, Dylan Lynch kick (Drive: 3 plays, 16 yards, 0:59; Fresno State 17–14)
- (0:10) NEV – Brendon Lewis 2-yard run, Matthew Killam kick (Drive: 14 plays, 83 yards, 5:36; Nevada 21–17)

Third quarter

- (4:13) FRES – Joshua Wood 7-yard run, Dylan Lynch kick (Drive: 6 plays, 95 yards, 2:27; Fresno State 24–21)

Fourth quarter

- No scoring plays

| Statistics | FRES | NEV |
|---|---|---|
| First downs | 16 | 16 |
| Total yards | 316 | 295 |
| Rushing yards | 126 | 84 |
| Passing yards | 190 | 211 |
| Passing: Comp–Att–Int | 13–20–1 | 16–25–0 |
| Time of possession | 27:39 | 32:10 |

| Team | Category | Player | Statistics |
|---|---|---|---|
| Fresno State | Passing | Mikey Keene | 13/20, 190 yards, INT |
| Fresno State | Rushing | Elijah Gilliam | 20 carries, 66 yards, 2 TD |
| Fresno State | Receiving | Ellijah Gilliam | 2 receptions, 74 yards |
| Nevada | Passing | Brendon Lewis | 13/19, 158 yards, TD |
| Nevada | Rushing | Savion Red | 13 carries, 56 yards, TD |
| Nevada | Receiving | Jaden Smith | 9 receptions, 134 yards |

=== vs San Jose State (Battle for the Valley) ===
Game Eight – San Jose State Spartans (5–2) vs Fresno State Bulldogs (4–3) – Game summary

| Quarter | 1 | 2 | 3 | 4 | Total |
|---|---|---|---|---|---|
| Spartans | 7 | 0 | 0 | 3 | 10 |
| Bulldogs | 3 | 17 | 7 | 6 | 33 |

at Valley Children's Stadium • Fresno, CA

- Date: Saturday October 26, 2024
- Game time: 5:00 p.m.
- Game weather: Cloudy • Temperature: 81 °F (27 °C) • Wind: NW 4 miles per hour (6.4 km/h)
- Game attendance: 41,343
- Referee: Kenneth Ray
- TV announcers (TruTV): Ari Wolfe (play-by-play) and Darius Walker (analyst)

Game information

First quarter

- (14:04) SJSU – Nick Nash 35-yard pass from Walker Eget, Kyler Halvorsen kick (Drive: 4 plays, 75 yards, 0:56; San Jose State 7–0)
- (9:48) FRES – Dylan Lynch 33-yard field goal (Drive: 10 plays, 60 yards, 4:16; San Jose State 7–3)

Second quarter

- (14:17) FRES – Elijah Gilliam 1-yard run, Dylan Lynch kick (Drive: 13 plays, 88 yards, 5:59; Fresno State 10–7)
- (11:14) FRES – Jalen Moss 43-yard pass from Mikey Keene, Dylan Lynch kick (Drive: 3 plays, 47 yards, 1:25; Fresno State 17–7)
- (2:19) FRES – Dylan Lynch 48-yard field goal (Drive: 14 plays, 61 yards, 6:03; Fresno State 20–7)

Third quarter

- (11:03) FRES – Mac Dalena 35-yard pass from Mikey Keene, Dylan Lynch kick (Drive: 10 plays, 75 yards, 3:57; Fresno State 27–7)

Fourth quarter

- (14:35) FRES – Jalen Moss 6-yard pass from Mikey Keene, Two–point conversion failed (Drive: 4 plays, 20 yards, 1:14; Fresno State 33–7)
- (5:08) SJSU – Kyler Halvorsen 37-yard field goal (Drive: 16 plays, 80 yards, 4:48; Fresno State 33–10)

| Statistics | SJSU | FRES |
|---|---|---|
| First downs | 20 | 22 |
| Total yards | 385 | 401 |
| Rushing yards | 101 | 126 |
| Passing yards | 284 | 275 |
| Passing: Comp–Att–Int | 21–51–4 | 30–41–1 |
| Time of possession | 24:38 | 35:12 |

| Team | Category | Player | Statistics |
|---|---|---|---|
| San Jose State | Passing | Walker Eget | 14/31, 202 yards, TD, 2 INT |
| San Jose State | Rushing | Floyd Chalk IV | 10 carries, 89 yards |
| San Jose State | Receiving | Justin Lockhart | 4 receptions, 93 yards |
| Fresno State | Passing | Mikey Keene | 30/41, 275 yards, 3 TD, INT |
| Fresno State | Rushing | Elijah Gilliam | 15 carries, 56 yards, TD |
| Fresno State | Receiving | Jalen Moss | 6 receptions, 85 yards, 2 TD |

=== vs. Hawaii (rivalry) ===
Game Nine – Hawaii Rainbow Warriors (3–5) at Fresno State Bulldogs (5–3) – Game summary

| Quarter | 1 | 2 | 3 | 4 | Total |
|---|---|---|---|---|---|
| Rainbow Warriors | 7 | 0 | 0 | 14 | 21 |
| Bulldogs | 7 | 6 | 7 | 0 | 20 |

at Valley Children's Stadium • Fresno, CA

- Date: Saturday November 2, 2024
- Game time: 7:00 PM EST
- Game weather: Sunny, 67 °F (19 °C)
- Game attendance: 41,575
- Referee: Jonathan Noli
- TV announcers (SPEC PPV): Kanoa Leahey (play-by-play) and Rich Miano (analyst)

Game information

First quarter

- (7:12) HAW – Pofele Ashlock 5-yard pass from Brayden Schager, Kansei Matsuzawa kick (Drive: 14 plays, 75 yards, 7:48; Hawaii 7–0)
- (1:32) FRES – Elijah Gilliam 10-yard run, Dylan Lynch kick (Drive: 12 plays, 83 yards, 5:34; Tied 7–7)

Second quarter

- (10:21) FRES – Raylenn Sharpe 5-yard pass from Mikey Keene, kick blocked (Drive: 8 plays, 28 yards, 2:31; Fresno State 13–7)

Third quarter

- (3:58) FRES – Phoenix Jackson 89-yard interception return, Dylan Lynch kick (Fresno State 20–7)

Fourth quarter

- (9:04) HAW – Nick Cenacle 9-yard pass from Brayden Schager, Kansei Matsuzawa kick (Drive: 12 plays, 87 yards, 4:40; Fresno State 20–14)
- (7:12) HAW – Nick Cenacle 5-yard pass from Brayden Schager, Kansei Matsuzawa kick (Drive: 10 plays, 47 yards, 1:15; Hawaii 21–20)

| Statistics | HAW | FRES |
|---|---|---|
| First downs | 24 | 14 |
| Total yards | 346 | 191 |
| Rushing yards | 102 | 19 |
| Passing yards | 244 | 172 |
| Passing: Comp–Att–Int | 29–53–1 | 25–31–0 |
| Time of possession | 38:08 | 21:52 |

| Team | Category | Player | Statistics |
|---|---|---|---|
| Hawaii | Passing | Brayden Schager | 29/53, 244 yards, 3 TD, INT |
| Hawaii | Rushing | Tylan Hines | 12 carries, 66 yards |
| Hawaii | Receiving | Nick Cenacle | 12 receptions, 113 yards, 2 TD |
| Fresno State | Passing | Mikey Keene | 25/31, 172 yards, TD |
| Fresno State | Rushing | Elijah Gilliam | 10 carries, 25 yards, TD |
| Fresno State | Receiving | Raylen Sharpe | 5 receptions, 63 yards, TD |

=== at Air Force ===
Fresno State Bulldogs (5–4) at Air Force Falcons (1–7) – Game summary

| Quarter | 1 | 2 | 3 | 4 | Total |
|---|---|---|---|---|---|
| Bulldogs | 7 | 14 | 0 | 7 | 28 |
| Falcons | 7 | 10 | 9 | 10 | 36 |

at Falcon Stadium • Colorado Springs, CO

- Date: November 9, 2024
- Game time: 6:45 p.m.
- Game weather: Clear • Temperature: 26 °F (−3 °C) • Wind: NW 7 miles per hour (11 km/h)
- Game attendance: 14,794
- Referee: Patrick Foy
- TV announcers (FS1): Chris Vosters (play-by-play) and Charles Arbuckle (analyst)

Game information

First quarter

- (11:01) FRES – Elijah Gilliam 1-yard run, Dylan Lynch kick (Drive: 7 plays, 59 yards, 3:52; Fresno State 7–0)
- (0:06) AFA – Dylan Carson 1-yard run, Matthew Dapore kick (Drive: 19 plays, 75 yards, 10:50; Tied 7–7)

Second quarter

- (4:45) AFA – Cade Harris 3-yard pass from Quentin Hayes, Matthew Dapore kick (Drive: 14 plays, 59 yards, 8:20; Air Force 14–7)
- (3:47) FRES – Mac Dalena 73-yard pass from Mikey Keene, Dylan Lynch kick (Drive: 3 plays, 75 yards, 0:58; Tied 14–14)
- (1:37) FRES – Jalen Moss 19-yard pass from Mikey Keene, Dylan Lynch kick (Drive: 3 plays, 34 yards, 0:46; Fresno State 21–14)
- (0:00) AFA – Matthew Dapore 35-yard field goal (Drive: 11 plays, 53 yards, 1:42; Fresno State 21–17)

Third quarter

- (9:46) AFA – Matthew Dapore 37-yard field goal (Drive: 9 plays, 56 yards, 5:14; Fresno State 21–20)
- (2:30) AFA – Quentin Haynes 2-yard run, two-point conversion failed (Drive: 11 plays, 42 yards, 6:29; Air Force 26–21)

Fourth quarter

- (8:51) AFA – Quentin Haynes 1-yard run, Michael Dapore kick (Drive: 12 plays, 64 yards, 6:39; Air Force 33–21)
- (1:56) AFA – Matthew Dapore 36-yard field goal (Drive: 8 plays, 6 yards, 3:57; Air Force 36–21)
- (0:38) FRES – Mac Dalena 6-yard pass from Mikey Keene, Dylan Lynch kick (Drive: 9 plays, 75 yards, 1:18; Air Force 36–28)

| Statistics | FRES | AFA |
|---|---|---|
| First downs | 14 | 24 |
| Total yards | 284 | 358 |
| Rushing yards | -5 | 344 |
| Passing yards | 289 | 14 |
| Passing: Comp–Att–Int | 23–26–1 | 2–6–0 |
| Time of possession | 14:52 | 45:08 |

| Team | Category | Player | Statistics |
|---|---|---|---|
| Fresno State | Passing | Mikey Keene | 23/26, 289 yards, 3 TD, INT |
| Fresno State | Rushing | Elijah Gilliam | 4 carries, 15 yards, TD |
| Fresno State | Receiving | Mac Dalena | 4 receptions, 89 yards. 2 TD |
| Air Force | Passing | Quentin Hayes | 2/6, 14 yards, TD |
| Air Force | Rushing | Dylan Carson | 33 carries, 120 yards, TD |
| Air Force | Receiving | Brandon Engel | 1 reception, 11 yards |

=== vs Colorado State ===
Colorado State Rams (7–3) vs Fresno State Bulldogs (5–5) – Game summary

| Quarter | 1 | 2 | 3 | 4 | Total |
|---|---|---|---|---|---|
| Rams | 7 | 0 | 7 | 8 | 22 |
| Bulldogs | 7 | 21 | 0 | 0 | 28 |

at Valley Children's Stadium • Fresno, CA

- Date: November 23, 2024
- Game time: 7:30 p.m.
- Game weather: Sunny • Temperature: 55 °F (13 °C) • Wind: NW 4 miles per hour (6.4 km/h)
- Game attendance: 39,543
- Referee: Kenneth Ray
- TV announcers (CBSSN): Carter Blackburn (play-by-play) and Randy Cross (analyst)

Game information

First quarter

- (8:28) CSU – Justin Marshall 10-yard run, Jordan Noyes kick (Drive: 12 plays, 77 yards, 6:26; Colorado State 7–0)
- (7:06) FRES – Bryson Donelson 16-yard run, Dylan Lynch kick (Drive: 4 plays, 80 yards, 1:18; Tied 7–7)

Second quarter

- (10:54) FRES – Joshua Wood 4-yard run, Dylan Lynch kick (Drive: 5 plays, 58 yards, 2:22; Fresno State 14–7)
- (3:18) FRES – Mac Dalena 28-yard pass from Mikey Keene, Dylan Lynch kick (Drive: 6 plays, 54 yards, 2:18; Fresno State 21–7)
- (0:23) FRES – Jalen Moss 15-yard pass from Mikey Keene, Dylan Lynch kick (Drive: 10 plays, 58 yards, 1:44; Fresno State 28–7)

Third quarter

- (3:25) CSU – Brayden Fowler-Nicolosi 9-yard run, Jordan Noyes kick (Drive: 6 plays, 35 yards, 2:15; Fresno State 28–14)

Fourth quarter

- (0:17) CSU – Jamari Person 5-yard pass from Brayden Fowler-Nicolosi, Vince Brown II–Brayden Fowler-Nicolosi two-point pass (Drive: 7 plays, 90 yards, 1:28; Fresno State 28–22)

| Statistics | CSU | FRES |
|---|---|---|
| First downs | 23 | 19 |
| Total yards | 422 | 343 |
| Rushing yards | 120 | 162 |
| Passing yards | 302 | 181 |
| Passing: Comp–Att–Int | 25–50–1 | 20–28–0 |
| Time of possession | 34:17 | 25:43 |

| Team | Category | Player | Statistics |
|---|---|---|---|
| Colorado State | Passing | Brayden Fowler-Nicolosi | 23/45, 283 yards, TD |
| Colorado State | Rushing | Justin Marshall | 20 carries, 94 yards, TD |
| Colorado State | Receiving | Jamari Person | 9 receptions, 112 yards, TD |
| Fresno State | Passing | Mikey Keene | 20/28, 181 yards, 2 TD |
| Fresno State | Rushing | Bryson Donelson | 13 carries, 150 yards, TD |
| Fresno State | Receiving | Mac Dalena | 7 receptions, 75 yards, TD |

=== at UCLA ===
Fresno State Bulldogs (6–5) at UCLA Bruins (4–7) – Game summary

| Quarter | 1 | 2 | 3 | 4 | Total |
|---|---|---|---|---|---|
| Bulldogs | 0 | 10 | 0 | 3 | 13 |
| Bruins | 3 | 3 | 7 | 7 | 20 |

at Rose Bowl • Pasadena, CA

- Date: November 30, 2024
- Game time: 12:30 p.m.
- Game weather: Sunny, 0 °F (−18 °C)
- Game attendance: 35,018
- Referee: Greg Sujack
- TV announcers (BTN): Guy Haberman (play-by-play), Yogi Roth (analyst), Rhett Lewis (sideline)

Game information

First quarter

- (4:36) UCLA – Mateen Bhaghani 23-yard field goal (Drive: 10 plays, 58 yards, 3:30; UCLA 3–0)

Second quarter

- (12:51) UCLA – Mateen Bhaghani 40-yard field goal (Drive: 4 plays, -10 yards, 1:11; UCLA 6–0)
- (7:29) FRES – Raylen Sharpe 7-yard pass from Mikey Keene, Dylan Lynch kick (Drive: 14 plays, 77 yards, 5:17; Fresno State 7–6)
- (0:00) FRES – Dylan Lynch 48-yard field goal (Drive: 10 plays, 60 yards, 1:18; Fresno State 10–6)

Third quarter

- (11:43) UCLA – T.J. Harden 5-yard run, Mateen Bhaghani kick (Drive: 4 plays, 56 yards, 1:56; UCLA 13–10)

Fourth quarter

- (1:38) UCLA – J. Michael Sturdivant 2-yard pass from Ethan Garbers, Mateen Bhaghani kick (Drive: 15 plays, 78 yards, 6:14; UCLA 20–10)
- (0:31) FRES – Dylan Lynch 42-yard field goal (Drive: 7 plays, 51 yards, 1:07; UCLA 20–13)

| Statistics | FRES | UCLA |
|---|---|---|
| First downs | 15 | 20 |
| Total yards | 281 | 363 |
| Rushing yards | 62 | 74 |
| Passing yards | 219 | 289 |
| Passing: Comp–Att–Int | 30–45–0 | 26–40–0 |
| Time of possession | 22:36 | 37:14 |

| Team | Category | Player | Statistics |
|---|---|---|---|
| Fresno State | Passing | Mikey Keene | 30/43, 219 yards, TD |
| Fresno State | Rushing | Bryson Donelson | 6 carries, 41 yards |
| Fresno State | Receiving | Mac Dalena | 7 receptions, 47 yards |
| UCLA | Passing | Ethan Garbers | 26/40, 289 yards, TD |
| UCLA | Rushing | Anthony Frias II | 13 carries, 43 yards |
| UCLA | Receiving | Moliki Matavao | 8 receptions, 120 yards |

=== Northern Illinois (Famous Idaho Potato Bowl) ===
2024 Famous Idaho Potato Bowl
Northern Illinois Huskies (7-5, 4-4) at Fresno State Bulldogs (6-6, 4-3)

| Quarter | 1 | 2 | 3 | 4 | OT | 2OT | Total |
|---|---|---|---|---|---|---|---|
| Huskies | 3 | 0 | 10 | 0 | 7 | 8 | 28 |
| Bulldogs | 13 | 0 | 0 | 0 | 7 | 0 | 20 |

at Albertsons Stadium, Boise, Idaho

- Date: December 23rd, 2024
- Game time: 11:30 a.m. PST
- TV: ESPN

Game information

First Quarter

- (11:29) FRES – Bryson Donelson 1 yard run, two-point pass conversion failed (Drive: 3 plays, 25 yards, 0:58; Fresno State 6–0)
- (2:45) NIU – Fresno State 26 yard field goal (Drive: 16 plays, 63 yards, 8:44; Fresno State 6–3)
- (1:08) FRES – Joshua Wood 13 yard run, Dylan Lynch kick (Drive: 4 plays, 90 yards, 1:37; Fresno State 13–3)

Second Quarter

- No scoring.

Third Quarter

- (11:22) NIU – Grayson Barnes 26 yard pass from Josh Holst, Kanon Woodill kick (Drive: 7 plays, 76 yards, 3:38; Fresno State 13–10)
- (7:39) NIU – Kanon Woodill 34 yard field goal (Drive: 5 plays, 34 yards, 2:11; Tied 13–13)

Fourth Quarter

- No scoring.

Overtime

- FRES – Bryson Donelson 9 yard pass from Joshua Wood, Dylan Lynch kick (Drive: 3 plays, 25 yards; Fresno State 20–13)
- NIU – Grayson Barnes 3 yard pass from Josh Holst, Kanon Woodill kick (Drive: 5 plays, 25 yards; Tied 20–20)

Second Overtime

- NIU – Dane Pardridge 25 yard pass from George Dimopoulos, George Dimopoulos two-point pass conversion from Josh Holst (Drive: 1 plays, 25 yards; Northern Illinois 28–20)

| Statistics | NIU | FRES |
|---|---|---|
| First downs | 24 | 17 |
| Total yards | 368 | 328 |
| Rushing yards | 161 | 117 |
| Passing yards | 207 | 211 |
| Passing: Comp–Att–Int | 19-31-1 | 19-29-1 |
| Time of possession | 39:14 | 20:46 |

| Team | Category | Player | Statistics |
|---|---|---|---|
| Northern Illinois | Passing | Josh Holst | 18/30, 182 yards, 2 TD, INT |
| Northern Illinois | Rushing | Josh Holst | 16 carries, 65 yards |
| Northern Illinois | Receiving | Dane Pardridge | 3 receptions, 59 yards, TD |
| Fresno State | Passing | Joshua Wood | 16/23, 180 yards, TD |
| Fresno State | Rushing | Bryson Donelson | 15 carries, 82 yards |
| Fresno State | Receiving | Mac Dalena | 6 receptions, 118 yards |
