= 2023 New Mexico Bowl =

Postseason college football bowl game

2023 Isleta New Mexico Bowl
- 18th New Mexico Bowl
New Mexico State Aggies	Fresno State Bulldogs
(10–4)	(8–4)
C-USA	MWC
10	37
Head coach: Jerry Kill	Head coach: Jeff Tedford
	1	2	3	4	Total
New Mexico State	0	3	7	0	10
Fresno State	10	7	3	17	37
- Date: December 16, 2023
- Season: 2023
- Stadium: University Stadium
- Location: Albuquerque, New Mexico
- MVP: Mikey Keene (QB, Fresno State) & Levelle Bailey (LB, Fresno State)
- Favorite: New Mexico State by 3.5
- Referee: Marshall Lewis (Sun Belt)
- Attendance: 30,822

United States TV coverage
- Network: ESPN
- Announcers: Clay Matvick (play-by-play), Rod Gilmore (analyst), and Lauren Sisler (sideline)

The 2023 New Mexico Bowl was a college football bowl game played on December 16, 2023, at University Stadium in Albuquerque, New Mexico. The 18th annual New Mexico Bowl game featured the New Mexico State Aggies of Conference USA and the Fresno State Bulldogs of the Mountain West Conference. The game began at approximately 3:45 p.m. MST and was aired on ESPN. The New Mexico Bowl was one of the 2023–24 bowl games concluding the 2023 FBS football season. The game was sponsored the Isleta Pueblo and officially known as the Isleta New Mexico Bowl.

== Teams ==
Consistent with conference tie-ins, the game featured the New Mexico State Aggies from Conference USA and the Fresno State Bulldogs from the Mountain West Conference.

This was the 20th meeting between Fresno State and New Mexico State. Entering the game, the Bulldogs led the all-time series, 18–1, with the Aggies' sole win coming on November 22, 2011, in Las Cruces by a score of 48–45.

On two occasions, Fresno State and New Mexico State were in the same conference, playing together in the Big West Conference from 1983 to 1991 and in the Western Athletic Conference (WAC) from 2005 to 2011.

=== New Mexico State ===
The Aggies started the season just 2–3, including a 41–30 loss to a UMass team that went on to finish the year with a 3–9 record. However, the Aggies finished their 13-game regular season with an eight-game win streak, punctuated by a 31–10 blowout upset over SEC foe Auburn, a game in which the Aggies were 25.5 point underdogs. The Aggies earned a berth in the Conference USA Championship, where they battled back and forth with an undefeated Liberty squad, but ultimately lost, 49–35. The Aggies entered the New Mexico Bowl with a record of 10–4.

This was New Mexico State's first New Mexico Bowl. Following the 2022 Quick Lane Bowl, which the Aggies won, it was the first time they appeared in back-to-back bowl games since the 1959 Sun Bowl and 1960 Sun Bowl.

=== Fresno State ===
Despite the graduation of star quarterback Jake Haener, the Bulldogs still aimed to contend for a Mountain West title. Fresno State won their first five games, including two Power Five wins over Purdue (39–35) and Arizona State (29–0). They earned a ranking in the AP poll, but quickly lost it after a Week 6 defeat by Wyoming. With starting quarterback Mikey Keene battling injury, the Bulldogs lost their final three regular-season games to fall out of contention for a Mountain West Championship. The Bulldogs entered the New Mexico Bowl with a record of 8–4.

This was Fresno State's fourth New Mexico Bowl, tying New Mexico for the most appearances in the game. The Bulldogs held a record of 1–2 in prior editions of the New Mexico Bowl, their sole win coming in the 2021 edition.

== Game summary ==
2023 Isleta New Mexico Bowl

Quarter	1	2	3	4	Total
New Mexico State	0	3	7	0	10
Fresno State	10	7	3	17	37

at University Stadium • Albuquerque, New Mexico

- Date: Saturday, December 16, 2023
- Game time: 3:45 p.m. MST
- Game weather: Mostly Cloudy • Temperature: 49 °F (9 °C)
- Game attendance: 30,822
- Referee: Marshall Lewis
- TV announcers (ESPN): Clay Matvick (play-by-play), Rod Gilmore (analyst), and Lauren Sisler (sideline)
- Box score

Game information

First Quarter

- (6:17) FRES – Dylan Lynch 32 yard field goal (Drive: 7 plays, 61 yards, 3:37; Fresno State 3–0)
- (3:26) FRES – Josiah Freeman 26 yard pass from Mikey Keene, Dylan Lynch kick (Drive: 3 plays, 40 yards, 1:35; Fresno State 10–0)

Second Quarter

- (10:47) NMSU – Ethan Albertson 45 yard field goal (Drive: 4 plays, 5 yards, 1:26; Fresno State 10–3)
- (7:02) FRES – Jaelen Gill 23 yard pass from Mikey Keene, Dylan Lynch kick (Drive: 7 plays, 82 yards, 3:45; Fresno State 17–3)

Third Quarter

- (11:50) FRES – Dylan Lynch 25 yard field goal (Drive: 9 plays, 68 yards, 3:10; Fresno State 20–3)
- (4:23) NMSU – Diego Pavia 14 yard run, Ethan Albertson kick (Drive: 14 plays, 75 yards, 7:27; Fresno State 20–10)

Fourth Quarter

- (13:20) FRES – Mikey Keene 4 yard run, Dylan Lynch kick (Drive: 13 plays, 66 yards, 6:03; Fresno State 27–10)
- (7:08) FRES – Dylan Lynch 38 yard field goal (Drive: 9 plays, 44 yards, 4:25; Fresno State 30–10)
- (4:40) FRES – Jalen Moss 9 yard pass from Mikey Keene, Dylan Lynch kick (Drive: 4 plays, 32 yards, 1:52; Fresno State 37–10)

=== Statistics ===
Statistics	NMSU	FSU
First downs	12	23
Plays–yards	60–200	65–500
Rushes–yards	35–142	25–120
Passing yards	58	380
Passing: comp–att–int	11–25–1	31–40–1
Time of possession	29:10	30:50

Team	Category	Player	Statistics
New Mexico State	Passing	Diego Pavia	11/25, 58 yards, INT
New Mexico State	Rushing	Diego Pavia	18 carries, 72 yards, TD
New Mexico State	Receiving	Eli Stowers	3 receptions, 20 yards
Fresno State	Passing	Mikey Keene	31/39, 380 yards, 3 TD, INT
Fresno State	Rushing	Malik Sherrod	20 carries, 90 yards
Fresno State	Receiving	Malik Sherrod	8 receptions, 81 yards
