= 2023 San Jose State Spartans football team =

American college football season

2023 San Jose State Spartans football

MW regular season co-champion

Hawaii Bowl, L 14–24 vs. Coastal Carolina
- Conference: Mountain West Conference
- Record: 7–6 (6–2 MW)
- Head coach: Brent Brennan (7th season)
- Offensive coordinator: Kevin McGiven (6th season)
- Offensive scheme: Spread option
- Defensive coordinator: Derrick Odum (7th season)
- Base defense: 3–4
- Home stadium: CEFCU Stadium

Uniform
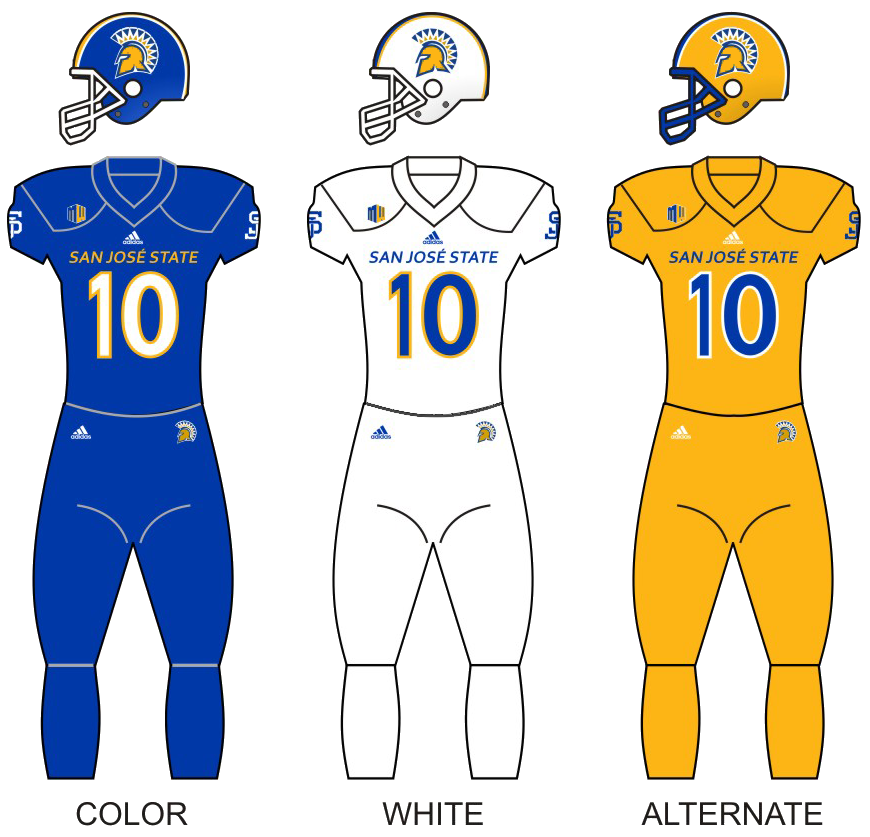

2023 Mountain West Conference football standings
	Conf.			Overall
Team	W		L	W		L
UNLV y	6	–	2	9	–	5
Boise State y$	6	–	2	8	–	6
San Jose State	6	–	2	7	–	6
Air Force	5	–	3	9	–	4
Wyoming	5	–	3	9	–	4
Fresno State	4	–	4	9	–	4
Utah State	4	–	4	6	–	7
Hawaii	3	–	5	5	–	8
Colorado State	3	–	5	5	–	7
Nevada	2	–	6	2	–	10
New Mexico	2	–	6	4	–	8
San Diego State	2	–	6	4	–	8
Championship: Boise State 44, UNLV 20
$ – Conference champion; y – Championship game participant

The 2023 San Jose State Spartans football team represented San Jose State University in the Mountain West Conference during the 2023 NCAA Division I FBS football season. The Spartans were led by Brent Brennan in his seventh and final year as head coach. They played their home games at CEFCU Stadium in San Jose, California. The San Jose State Spartans football team drew an average home attendance of 16,804 in 2023. The season had a 7–6 record, including 6–2 in Mountain West Conference games, and a share of the Mountain West regular season championship, and appearance in the 2023 Hawaii Bowl.

== Offseason ==
=== Transfers ===
==== Outgoing ====
Player	Position	Destination
Giovonni Harper	S	Texas Southern
Grady Manley	DL	Unknown
Isaiah Hamilton	WR	Washington State
Mikale Greer	CB	Northern Arizona
Terrence Loville	WR	College of San Mateo
Jermaine Braddock	WR	Portland State
Ryan Nixon	CB	Valdosta State
Isaiah Ifanse	RB	California

==== Incoming ====
Player	Position	Previous School
Quali Conley	RB	Utah Tech
Jayvion Cole	CB	Cal Poly
DJ Harvey	CB	Virginia Tech
Jay Butterfield	QB	Oregon
Kyler Halvorsen	K	Hawaii

== Schedule ==
Date	Time	Opponent	Site	TV	Result	Attendance
August 26	5:00 p.m.	at No. 6 USC*	Los Angeles Memorial Coliseum; Los Angeles, CA	P12N	L 28–56	63,411
September 3	12:30 p.m.	No. 18 Oregon State*	CEFCU Stadium; San Jose, CA	CBS	L 17–42	20,337
September 9	1:00 p.m.	Cal Poly*	CEFCU Stadium; San Jose, CA	NBCSBA	W 59–3	14,224
September 16	4:00 p.m.	at Toledo*	Glass Bowl; Toledo, OH	ESPN+	L 17–21	20,039
September 22	7:30 p.m.	Air Force	CEFCU Stadium; San Jose, CA	FS1	L 20–45	16,124
October 7	5:00 p.m.	at Boise State	Albertsons Stadium; Boise, ID	CBSSN	L 27–35	37,491
October 14	3:00 p.m.	at New Mexico	University Stadium; Albuquerque, NM	MW Network	W 52–24	13,027
October 21	4:00 p.m.	Utah State^{†}	CEFCU Stadium; San Jose, CA	CBSSN	W 42–21	15,028
October 28	9:00 p.m.	at Hawaii	Clarence T. C. Ching Athletics Complex; Honolulu, HI (Dick Tomey Legacy Game)	SPEC PPV	W 35–0	11,486
November 11	7:30 p.m.	Fresno State	CEFCU Stadium; San Jose, CA (rivalry)	CBSSN	W 42–18	18,886
November 18	7:30 p.m.	San Diego State	CEFCU Stadium; San Jose, CA	CBSSN	W 24–13	16,224
November 25	12:30 p.m.	at UNLV	Allegiant Stadium; Las Vegas, NV	KVVU / MW Network	W 37–31	25,554
December 23	7:30 p.m.	vs. Coastal Carolina*	Clarence T. C. Ching Athletics Complex; Honolulu, HI (Hawaii Bowl)	ESPN	L 14–24	7,089
*Non-conference game; ^{†}Homecoming; Rankings from AP Poll (and CFP Rankings, after November 7) - Released prior to game; All times are in Pacific time

== Roster ==
2023 San Jose State Spartans football team roster
Players
Coaches
Offense

Pos.	#	Name	Class
WR	0	Isaac Jernagin	Jr
WR	1	Kejuan Bullard Jr.	Fr
QB	2	Chevan Cordeiro	Sr
WR	3	Nick Nash	Jr
WR	4	Charles Ross	Jr
QB	5	Walker Eget	So
RB	7	Quali Conley	Jr
QB	9	Jay Butterfield	So
QB	10	Tyler Voss	Fr
WR	11	Justin Lockhart	Sr
WR	11	Malikhi Miller	Jr
WR	13	Branden Alvarez	So
WR	15	Matthew Coleman	Fr
QB	16	Anthony Garcia	Fr
WR	17	Cooper Hoch	Fr
WR	18	Keynan Higgins	Fr
RB	20	Jabari Bates	Fr
RB	21	Kayden Collins	Fr
WR	24	Sebastian Macaluso	Jr
RB	28	Jakob Galloway	Fr
RB	32	Kairee Robinson	Sr
RB	34	Viliami Teu	Fr
OT	54	Jaime Navarro	GS
OL	55	James McNorton	So
OL	60	Hudson Mesa	So
OL	61	Marist Talavou	Jr
OL	62	Nathan Balestrieri	Fr
OL	65	Denaris DeRosa Jr.	Fr
OL	67	Kai Davison	So
OL	68	Ryan Stewart	So
OL	69	Uluakinofo Taliauli	Fr
OL	70	Malik Williams	So
OL	71	Tyler Ostrom	GS
OL	72	Nate Hale	Fr
OL	73	Laakea Kapoi	Fr
OL	74	Anthony Pardue	GS
OL	75	Joseph Harbert	Fr
OL	77	Luke Griskey	Fr
OL	78	Jake Steele	Fr
OL	79	Fernando Carmona Jr.	So
WR	80	Trevor Voss	Fr
TE	81	Dominick Mazotti	Jr
WR	82	Nicholas Williams	Fr
TE	83	Kamaehu Kopa-Kaawahauole	Fr
TE	84	Joshua Scott	Fr
TE	85	Jackson Canaan	So
TE	86	Skylar Loving-Black	Sr
WR	87	Joseph Hernandez Jr.	Fr
TE	88	Sam Olson	Jr
TE	89	Nate Lewis	Fr

Defense

Pos.	#	Name	Class
DB	1	Chase Williams	Sr
DB	2	D. J. Harvey	So
DL	3	Tre Smith	So
DL	4	Noah Lavulo	Sr
LB	5	Jaylan Lawson	Sr
LB	6	Bryun Parham	Jr
CB	7	Kenyon Reed	Jr
CB	8	Jay'Vion Cole	So
LB	9	Matthew Tago	Sr
LB	10	Jordan Pollard	So
LB	14	Elijah Wood	So
CB	15	Jalen Bainer	So
DB	16	Imari Conley	Fr
DB	17	Zavion Reese	Jr
LB	19	Noah McNeal-Franklin	Jr
DB	20	Isiah Revis	So
S	22	Tre Jenkins	GS
LB	23	Justin Stearns	Fr
LB	24	Justin Eklund	Fr
DB	25	Michael Dansby	So
LB	26	Ethan Powell	So
S	27	Andrew Jenkins	GS
LB	28	Jordan Allen	So
DB	29	Jalen Apalit-Williams	So
DB	30	Assani Berkeley	So
DB	31	Hunter Nowell	Fr
LB	34	Dylan Lee	Fr
LB	35	Charles Rogers	Sr
DB	36	Jeremiah Zamora	Fr
DL	37	Dylan Hamptsen	Fr
DB	38	Elisha Guidry	Sr
CB	39	Caleb Womack	Fr
DL	40	Tavarius Pitts	Jr
LB	41	Taniela Latu	Jr
DL	42	Soane Toia	Jr
LB	44	Jordan Cobbs	Jr
LB	45	Alexander Cobbs	Fr
DL	48	Dejon Roney	So
DL	50	Gafa Faga	So
LB	53	Brady Van Bennekum	Fr
DL	56	Jairus Satele	Fr
DL	90	Akio Martinson	Fr
DL	91	Quincy Likio	Jr
DL	92	Natano Woods	So
DL	94	Mata Hola	So
DL	95	Tangata Tuitupou	Jr
DL	96	Jay Kakiva	GS
DL	97	John Norwood	Fr
DL	98	Naka Hansen	Fr
DL	99	Kaleb Peleki	Fr

Special teams

Pos.	#	Name	Class
K	11	Kyler Halvorsen	Jr
K	39	Dino Beslagic	Fr
K	49	Tarne Schive	Jr
LS	51	Andrew Gonneville	Sr
LS	59	Davis Salom	So
P	99	Alex Weir	Sr

Head coach

- Brent Brennan

Coordinators/assistant coaches

- Derrick Odum – Associate head coach/Defensive coordinator
- Kevin McGiven – Offensive coordinator/Quarterbacks
- Scott White – Special teams coordinator/Linebackers
- Alonzo Carter – Running backs
- Matt Adkins – Tight ends
- Eric Scott – Wide receivers
- Rob Christoff – Outside linebackers
- Josh Oglesby – Offensive linemen
- Chip Viney – Cornerbacks
- Joe Seumalo – Defensive linemen
- Cullen Carroll – Director, Strength and Conditioning
- Terry Malley – Offensive analyst
- Lyle Moevao – Offensive analyst
- Joe Palcic – Special teams analyst
- Sam Maday – Graduate assistant
- Tamarick Pierce – Graduate assistant
- Jace Schneider – Graduate assistant
- J. P. Sorensen – Graduate assistant

Legend

- (C) Team captain
- (S) Suspended
- (I) Ineligible
- Injured
- Redshirt

Roster
Last update: 8/23/23

== Game summaries ==
=== at No. 6 USC ===
San José State Spartans (0–0) at No. 6 USC Trojans (0–0) – Game summary

Quarter	1	2	3	4	Total
Spartans	0	14	7	7	28
No. 6 Trojans	7	14	21	14	56

at Los Angeles Memorial Coliseum • Los Angeles, CA

- Date: August 26, 2023
- Game time: 5:00 p.m.
- Game weather: Sunny, 82 °F (28 °C)
- Game attendance: 63,411
- Referee: Jeff Dahle
- TV announcers (Pac-12 Network): Ted Robinson (play-by-play), Yogi Roth (analyst)
- Boxscore

Game information

First quarter

- (6:32) USC – Dorian Singer 13-yard pass from Caleb Williams, Denis Lynch kick (Drive: 10 plays, 80 yards, 3:41; USC 7–0)

Second quarter

- (14:12) SJSU – Kairee Robinson 1-yard rush, Kyler Halvorsen kick (Drive: 12 plays, 72 yards, 7:12; Tied 7–7)
- (9:38) USC – Tahj Washington 76-yard pass from Caleb Williams, Denis Lynch kick (Drive: 4 plays, 92 yards, 1:48; USC 14–7)
- (3:31) USC – Austin Jones 2-yard run, Denis Lynch kick (Drive: 10 plays, 52 yards, 4:32; USC 21–7)
- (0:08) SJSU – Nick Nash 28-yard pass from Chevan Cordeiro, Kyler Halvorsen kick (Drive: 4 plays, 46 yards, 0:19; USC 21–14)

Third quarter

- (10:45) USC – Austin Jones 3-yard run, Denis Lynch kick (Drive: 10 plays, 75 yards, 4:15; USC 28–14)
- (6:00) USC – Zachariah Branch 25-yard pass from Caleb Williams, Denis Lynch kick (Drive: 5 plays, 52 yards, 1:35; USC 35–14)
- (1:50) SJSU – Nick Nash 32-yard pass from Chevan Cordeiro, Kyler Halvorsen kick (Drive: 9 plays, 75 yards, 4:10; USC 35–21)
- (1:34) USC – Zachariah Branch 96-yard kickoff return, Denis Lynch kick (Drive: 4 plays, 46 yards, 0:19; USC 42–21)

Fourth quarter

- (12:28) USC – Brenden Rice 12-yard pass from Caleb Williams, Denis Lynch kick (Drive: 6 plays, 55 yards, 2:32; USC 49–21)
- (6:53) USC – Miller Moss 4-yard rush, Denis Lynch kick (Drive: 9 plays, 78 yards, 4:11; USC 56–21)
- (5:08) SJSU – Nick Nash 2-yard pass from Chevan Cordeiro, Kyler Halvorsen kick (Drive: 4 plays, 85 yards, 1:39; USC 56–28)

Statistics	SJSU	USC
First downs	24	25
Total yards	396	501
Rushes/yards	27–198	33–169
Passing yards	198	341
Passing: Comp–Att–Int	21–38–0	24–35–0
Time of possession	30:42	29:18

Team	Category	Player	Statistics
San Jose State	Passing	Chevan Cordeiro	21/38, 198 yards, 3 TD
San Jose State	Rushing	Quali Conley	6 carries, 108 yards
San Jose State	Receiving	Nick Nash	6 receptions, 89 yards, 3 TD
USC	Passing	Caleb Williams	18/25, 178 yards, 4 TD
USC	Rushing	Austin Jones	6 carries, 54 yards, 2 TD
USC	Receiving	Tahj Washington	2 receptions, 85 yards, TD

=== No. 18 Oregon State ===
No. 18 Oregon State Beavers (0-0) at San Jose State Spartans (0-1)

Quarter	1	2	3	4	Total
No. 18 Beavers	7	14	7	14	42
Spartans	0	3	0	14	17

at CEFCU Stadium, San Jose, CA

- Date: September 3, 2023
- Game time: 12:30 p.m. PST
- Game weather: Cloudy, 75 °F (24 °C)
- Game attendance: 20,337
- Referee: Mike McCabe
- TV announcers (CBS): Chris Lewis (play-by-play), Ross Tucker (analyst), and Justin Walters (sideline)

Game information

First quarter

- (5:51) OSU – DJ Uiagalelei 1 Yd Run, Atticus Sappington Kick (Drive: 11 plays, 82 yards, 6:19; Oregon State 7–0)

Second quarter

- (9:24) SJSU – Kyler Halvorsen 41 Yd Field Goal (Drive: 10 plays, 37 yards, 5:25; Oregon State 7–3)
- (4:21) OSU – Jack Velling 14 Yd pass from DJ Uiagalelei, Atticus Sappington Kick (Drive: 10 plays, 73 yards, 4:58; Oregon State 14–3)
- (0:14) OSU – DJ Uiagalelei 1 Yd Run, Atticus Sappington Kick (Drive: 6 plays, 64 yards, 1:46; Oregon State 21–3)

Third quarter

- (6:02) OSU – Jeremiah Noga 31 Yd pass from DJ Uiagalelei, Atticus Sappington Kick (Drive: 6 plays, 55 yards, 2:43; Oregon State 28–3)

Fourth quarter

- (14:52) SJSU – Sam Olson 0 Yd Run, Kyler Halvorsen Kick (Drive: 5 plays, 22 yards, 1:37; Oregon State 28–10)
- (10:13) OSU – Anthony Gould 28 Yd pass from DJ Uiagalelei, Atticus Sappington Kick (Drive: 7 plays, 65 yards, 4:35; Oregon State 35–10)
- (3:13) OSU – Deshaun Fenwick 3 Yd Run, Atticus Sappington Kick (Drive: 7 plays, 54 yards, 3:13; Oregon State 42–10)
- (0:04) SJSU – Branden Alvarez 19 Yd pass from Jay Butterfield, Kyler Halvorsen Kick (Drive: 10 plays, 75 yards, 3:09; Oregon State 42–17)

Statistics	ORST	SJSU
First downs	27	20
Total yards	63–473	47–279
Rushing yards	35–197	22–56
Passing yards	276	223
Turnovers	22–28–0	25–42–0
Time of possession	31:55	28:05

Team	Category	Player	Statistics
Oregon State	Passing	DJ Uiagalelei	20/25, 239 yards, 3 TD
Oregon State	Rushing	Damien Martinez	18 carries, 145 yards
Oregon State	Receiving	Anthony Gould	3 receptions, 59 yards, TD
SJSU	Passing	Chevan Cordeiro	18/32, 143 yards
SJSU	Rushing	Quali Conley	11 carries, 34 yards
SJSU	Receiving	Sam Olson	6 receptions, 60 yards

=== Cal Poly ===
Cal Poly Mustangs (1–0) at San Jose State Spartans (0–2)

Quarter	1	2	3	4	Total
Mustangs	0	3	0	0	3
Spartans	17	21	21	0	59

at CEFCU Stadium, San Jose, CA

- Date: September 9, 2023
- Game time: 1:00 p.m. PST
- Game attendance: 14,224
- TV: NBCSBA

Game information

First Quarter
Second Quarter
Third Quarter
Fourth Quarter

Win Probability

Line

Over/Under

Statistics	CP	SJSU
First downs		
Total yards		
Rushing yards		
Passing yards		
Turnovers		
Time of possession		

Team	Category	Player	Statistics
Cal Poly	Passing		
Cal Poly	Rushing		
Cal Poly	Receiving		
SJSU	Passing		
SJSU	Rushing		
SJSU	Receiving		

=== At Toledo ===
San Jose State Spartans (1–2) at Toledo Rockets (1–1)

Quarter	1	2	3	4	Total
Spartans	0	10	7	0	17
Rockets	0	7	14	0	21

at Glass Bowl, Toledo, OH

- Date: September 16, 2023
- Game time: 4:00 p.m. PST
- Game attendance: 20,039
- TV: ESPN+

Game information

First Quarter
Second Quarter
Third Quarter
Fourth Quarter

Win Probability

Line

Over/Under

Statistics	SJSU	TOL
First downs		
Total yards		
Rushing yards		
Passing yards		
Turnovers		
Time of possession		

Team	Category	Player	Statistics
SJSU	Passing		
SJSU	Rushing		
SJSU	Receiving		
Toledo	Passing		
Toledo	Rushing		
Toledo	Receiving		

=== Air Force ===
Air Force Falcons (3–0) at San Jose State Spartans (1–3)

Quarter	1	2	3	4	Total
Falcons	3	14	7	21	45
Spartans	6	14	0	0	20

at CEFCU Stadium, San Jose, CA

- Date: September 22, 2023
- Game time: 7:30 p.m. PST
- Game weather: Temperature: 67 °F (19 °C) • Wind: SE at 9 miles per hour (14 km/h) • Weather: Sunny
- Game attendance: 16,124
- Referee: Christian Watson
- TV announcers (FS1): Dan Hellie (Play-by-play) & Petros Papadakis (Analyst)
- ESPN – Michel, Eldridge help Air Force run over San Jose State 45-20 for 8th straight win

Game information

First quarter

- (10:43) SJS TD – Chevan Cordeiro 10-yard rush, Kyler Halvorsen PAT failed
  Drive: 8 plays, 75 yards, 4:17; San Jose State 6–0
- (03:02) AF FG – Reagan Tubbs 30-yard field goal
  Drive: 13 plays, 62 yards, 7:41; San Jose State 6–3

Second quarter

- (10:53) AF TD – Emmanuel Michel 17-yard rush, Reagan Tubbs kick
  Drive: 10 plays, 65 yards, 4:55; Air Force 10–6
- (07:57) SJS TD – Kairee Robinson 29-yard rush, Kyler Halvorsen kick
  Drive: 6 plays, 60 yards, 2:52; San Jose State 13–10
- (03:24) SJS TD – Kairee Robinson 1-yard rush, Kyler Halvorsen kick
  Drive: 5 plays, 64 yards, 2:29; San Jose State 20–10
- (00:25) AF TD – Emmanuel Michel 4-yard rush, Reagan Tubbs kick
  Drive: 12 plays, 75 yards, 2:59; San Jose State 20–17

Third quarter

- (06:18) AF TD – John Lee Eldridge III 5-yard rush, Reagan Tubbs kick
  Drive: 15 plays, 75 yards, 8:42; Air Force 24–20

Fourth quarter

- (12:50) AF TD – Emmanuel Michel 1-yard rush, Reagan Tubbs kick
  Drive: 13 plays, 71 yards, 7:38; Air Force 31–20
- (07:51) AF TD – John Lee Eldridge III 34-yard rush, Reagan Tubbs kick
  Drive: 4 plays, 40 yards, 2:05; Air Force 38–20
- (02:20) AF TD – Jet Harris 2-yard rush, Reagan Tubbs kick
  Drive: 5 plays, 22 yards, 2:56; Air Force 45–20

Win Probability

Line

Over/Under

Statistics	AF	SJSU
First downs	25	18
Total yards	428	354
Rushing yards	73–400	17–115
Passing yards	28	239
Turnovers	0	1
Time of possession	39:05	20:55

Team	Category	Player	Statistics
Air Force	Passing	Zac Larrier	2/2, 28 yards
Air Force	Rushing	Emmanuel Michel	33 carries, 148 yards, 3 TD
Air Force	Receiving	Jared Roznos	1 reception, 22 yards
SJSU	Passing	Chevan Cordeiro	24/35, 238 yards, 1 INT
SJSU	Rushing	Kairee Robinson	7 carries, 82 yards, 2 TD
SJSU	Receiving	Dominick Mazotti	5 receptions, 60 yards

=== At Boise State ===
San Jose State Spartans (1–4) at Boise State Broncos (2–3)

Quarter	1	2	3	4	Total
Spartans	14	13	0	0	27
Broncos	0	14	7	14	35

at Albertsons Stadium, Boise, ID

- Date: October 7, 2023
- Game time: 5:00 p.m. PST
- Game attendance: 37,491
- TV: CBSSN

Game information

First Quarter
Second Quarter
Third Quarter
Fourth Quarter

Win Probability

Line

Over/Under

Statistics	SJSU	BSU
First downs		
Total yards		
Rushing yards		
Passing yards		
Turnovers		
Time of possession		

Team	Category	Player	Statistics
SJSU	Passing		
SJSU	Rushing		
SJSU	Receiving		
Boise State	Passing		
Boise State	Rushing		
Boise State	Receiving		

=== At New Mexico ===
San Jose State Spartans (1–5) at New Mexico Lobos (2–3)

Quarter	1	2	3	4	Total
Spartans	0	14	24	14	52
Lobos	3	14	0	7	24

at University Stadium, Albuquerque, NM

- Date: October 14, 2023
- Game time: 3:00 p.m. PST
- TV: MW Network

Game information

First Quarter
Second Quarter
Third Quarter
Fourth Quarter

Win Probability

Line

Over/Under

Statistics	SJSU	UNM
First downs		
Total yards		
Rushing yards		
Passing yards		
Turnovers		
Time of possession		

Team	Category	Player	Statistics
SJSU	Passing		
SJSU	Rushing		
SJSU	Receiving		
New Mexico	Passing		
New Mexico	Rushing		
New Mexico	Receiving		

=== Utah State ===
Utah State Aggies (3–4) at San Jose State Spartans (2–5)

Quarter	1	2	3	4	Total
Aggies	0	0	0	0	0
Spartans	0	0	0	0	0

at CEFCU Stadium, San Jose, CA

- Date: October 21, 2023
- Game time: 4:00 p.m. PST
- TV: CBSSN

Game information

First Quarter
Second Quarter
Third Quarter
Fourth Quarter

Win Probability

Line

Over/Under

Statistics	USU	SJSU
First downs		
Total yards		
Rushing yards		
Passing yards		
Turnovers		
Time of possession		

Team	Category	Player	Statistics
Utah State	Passing		
Utah State	Rushing		
Utah State	Receiving		
SJSU	Passing		
SJSU	Rushing		
SJSU	Receiving		

=== at Hawaii ===
San Jose State Spartans (3–5) at Hawaii Rainbow Warriors (2–6)

Quarter	1	2	3	4	Total
Spartans	7	14	7	7	35
Rainbow Warriors	0	0	0	0	0

at Ching Complex, Honolulu, HI

- Date: October 28, 2023
- Game time: 9:00 p.m. PST
- Game attendance: 11,486
- TV: SPEC PPV

Game information

First Quarter
Second Quarter
Third Quarter
Fourth Quarter

Win Probability

Line

Over/Under

Statistics	SJSU	HAW
First downs		
Total yards		
Rushing yards		
Passing yards		
Turnovers		
Time of possession		

Team	Category	Player	Statistics
SJSU	Passing		
SJSU	Rushing		
SJSU	Receiving		
Hawaii	Passing		
Hawaii	Rushing		
Hawaii	Receiving		

=== Fresno State ===
Fresno State Bulldogs (8–1) at San Jose State Spartans (4–5)

Quarter	1	2	3	4	Total
Bulldogs	3	7	0	8	18
Spartans	21	7	7	7	42

at CEFCU Stadium, San Jose, CA

- Date: November 11, 2023
- Game time: 7:30 p.m. PST
- Game weather: Clear • Temperature: 61 °F (16 °C) • Wind:
- Game attendance: 18,886
- Referee: Christian Watson
- TV announcers (CBSSN): Rich Waltz (play-by-play) & Aaron Taylor (analyst) & Brandon Bishop (sideline)

Game information

First quarter

- (12:34) SJSU – Malikhi Miller 25-yard pass from Chevan Cordeiro, Kyler Halvorsen kick (Drive: 6 plays, 80 yards, 2:26; San Jose State 7–0)
- (6:04) FRES – Daniel Lynch 31-yard field goal (Drive: 15 plays, 60 yards, 6:30; San Jose State 7–3)
- (2:55) SJSU – Isaac Jernagin 7-yard pass from Chevan Cordeiro, Kyler Halvorsen kick (Drive: 7 plays, 60 yards, 3:09; San Jose State 14–3)
- (1:25) SJSU – Kairee Robinson 4-yard run, Kyler Halvorsen kick (Drive: 3 plays, 18 yards, 1:20; San Jose State 21–3)

Second quarter

- (9:55) SJSU – Nick Nash 14-yard pass from Chevan Cordeiro, Kyler Halvorsen kick (Drive: 8 plays, 77 yards, 4:52; San Jose State 28–3)
- (7:57) FRES – Mac Dalena 39-yard pass from Mikey Keene, Daniel Lynch kick (Drive: 7 plays, 72 yards, 1:54; San Jose State 28–10)

Third quarter

- (2:55) SJSU – Michael Dansby 98-yard interception return, Kyler Halvorsen kick (San Jose State 35–10)

Fourth quarter

- (11:07) SJSU – Kairee Robinson 5-yard run, Kyler Halvorsen kick (Drive: 2 plays, 52 yards, 0:55; San Jose State 42–10)
- (9:01) FRES – Jalen Moss 11-yard pass from Logan Fife, Jake Boust–Logan Fife 2-point pass (Drive: 7 plays, 72 yards, 2:01; San Jose State 42–18)

Win Probability

Line

Over/Under

Statistics	FRE	SJSU
First downs	19	21
Total yards	308	459
Rushing yards	83	313
Passing yards	225	146
Turnovers	2	0
Time of possession	27:40	32:20

Team	Category	Player	Statistics
Fresno State	Passing	Logan Fife	11/21, 115 yards, TD, INT
Fresno State	Rushing	Malik Sherrod	15 carries, 68 yards
Fresno State	Receiving	Mac Dalena	6 receptions, 69 yards, TD
SJSU	Passing	Chevan Cordeiro	9/18, 146 yards, 3 TD
SJSU	Rushing	Kairee Robinson	19 carries, 200 yards, 2 TD
SJSU	Receiving	Nick Nash	4 receptions, 66 yards, TD

=== San Diego State ===
San Diego State Aztecs (3–7) at San Jose State Spartans (5–5)

Quarter	1	2	3	4	Total
Aztecs	7	3	0	3	13
Spartans	0	10	7	7	24

at CEFCU Stadium, San Jose, CA

- Date: November 18, 2023
- Game time: 7:30 p.m.
- Game weather: Cloudy, Temperature: 64 °F (18 °C), Wind: W 6 mph
- Game attendance: 16,225
- Referee: Jon Noli
- TV announcers (CBSSN): Dave Ryan (play-by-play), Donte Whitner (analyst), and Emily Proud (sideline)

Game information

First Quarter

- (5:01) SDSU - Jaylon Armstead 1 yard run (Gabriel Plascencia kick); 13 plays, 77 yards, 7:30 (San Diego State 7-0)

Second Quarter

- (14:19) SJSU - Dominick Mazotti 10 yard pass from Chevan Cordeiro (Kyler Halvorsen kick); 10 plays, 71 yards, 5:37 (Tied 7-7)
- (3:03) SDSU - Gabriel Plascencia 46 yard field goal; 7 plays, 4 yards, 3:37 (San Diego State 10-7)
- (0:00) SJSU - Kyler Halvorsen 35 yard field goal; 10 plays, 57 yards, 3:03 (Tied 10-10)

Third Quarter

- (6:16) SJSU - Quali Conley 20 yard run (Kyler Halvorsen kick); 5 plays, 74 yards, 2:41 (San Jose State 17-10)

Fourth Quarter

- (8:54) SDSU - Gabriel Plascencia 21 yard field goal; 16 plays, 85 yards, 7:50 (San Jose State 17-13)
- (5:13) SJSU - Kairee Robinson 5 yard run (Kyler Halvorsen kick); 6 plays, 94 yards, 3:41 (San Jose State 24-13)

Win Probability

Line

Over/Under

Statistics	SDSU	SJSU
First downs	18	19
Total yards	300	355
Rushing yards	183	181
Passing yards	117	174
Turnovers	2	1
Time of possession	35:16	24:44

Team	Category	Player	Statistics
San Diego State	Passing	Jalen Mayden	15/24, 117 yards, 2 INT
San Diego State	Rushing	Jaylon Armstead	21 carries, 134 yards, TD
San Diego State	Receiving	Phillippe Wesley II	4 receptions, 48 yards
SJSU	Passing	Chevan Cordeiro	15/20, 174 yards, TD, INT
SJSU	Rushing	Quali Conley	13 carries, 155 yards, TD
SJSU	Receiving	Isaac Jernagin	2 receptions, 56 yards

=== at UNLV ===
San Jose State Spartans (6–5) at UNLV Rebels (9–2)

Quarter	1	2	3	4	Total
Spartans	17	3	10	7	37
Rebels	7	3	7	14	31

at Allegiant Stadium, Las Vegas, NV

- Date: November 25, 2023
- Game time: 4:00 p.m. PST
- Game weather: None (Indoor stadium)
- Game attendance: 25,554
- Referee: Nolan Dumas
- TV announcers (KVVU): Steve Cofield, Matt Neverett

Game information

First quarter

- (12:49) SJSU – Sam Olson 56-yard pass from Chevan Cordeiro, Kyler Halvorsen kick (Drive: 4 plays, 75 yards, 2:11; San Jose State 7–0)
- (9:57) SJSU – Kyler Halvorsen 25-yard field goal (Drive: 7 plays, 19 yards, 2:55; San Jose State 10–0)
- (4:37) SJSU – Kairee Robinson 25-yard run, Kyler Halvorsen kick (Drive: 8 plays, 80 yards, 4:06; San Jose State 17–0)
- (2:08) UNLV – Jai'Den Thomas 7-yard run, Jose Pizano kick (Drive: 6 plays, 70 yards, 2:29; San Jose State 17–7)

Second quarter

- (10:59) SJSU – Kyler Halvorsen 30-yard field goal (Drive: 11 plays, 62 yards, 6:04; San Jose State 20–7)
- (3:33) UNLV – Jose Pizano 34-yard field goal (Drive: 5 plays, 65 yards, 1:57; San Jose State 20–10)

Third quarter

- (13:10) UNLV – Jai'Den Thomas 3-yard run, Jose Pizano kick (Drive: 4 plays, 75 yards, 1:50; San Jose State 20–17)
- (9:43) SJSU – Isaac Jernagin 3-yard pass from Chevan Cordeiro, Kyler Halvorsen kick (Drive: 6 plays, 75 yards, 3:27; San Jose State 27–17)
- (4:49) SJSU – Kyler Halvorsen 22-yard field goal (Drive: 9 plays, 59 yards, 4:26; San Jose State 30–17)

Fourth quarter

- (11:27) SJSU – Kairee Robinson 40-yard run, Kyler Halvorsen kick (Drive: 7 plays, 70 yards, 4:18; San Jose State 37–17)
- (6:19) UNLV – Jai'Den Thomas 2-yard run, Jose Pizano kick (Drive: 13 plays, 70 yards, 5:03; San Jose State 37–24)
- (1:27) UNLV – Corey Thompson Jr. 29-yard pass from Jayden Maiava, Jose Pizano kick (Drive: 8 plays, 90 yards, 2:24; San Jose State 37–31)

Win Probability

Line

Over/Under

Statistics	SJSU	UNLV
First downs	21	22
Total yards	482	411
Rushing yards	233	182
Passing yards	249	229
Turnovers	0	1
Time of possession	36:40	23:20

Team	Category	Player	Statistics
SJSU	Passing	Chevan Cordeiro	19/26, 249 yards, 2 TD
SJSU	Rushing	Kairee Robinson	17 carries, 168 yards, 2 TD
SJSU	Receiving	Nick Nash	3 receptions, 98 yards
UNLV	Passing	Jayden Maiava	19/29, 229 yards, TD
UNLV	Rushing	Vincent Davis	9 carries, 88 yards
UNLV	Receiving	Ricky White	5 receptions, 111 yards

=== vs. Coastal Carolina (Hawaii Bowl) ===
Coastal Carolina Chanticleers (7–5) vs. San Jose State Spartans (7–5) (2023 EasyPost Hawaii Bowl)

Quarter	1	2	3	4	Total
Chanticleers	7	0	7	10	24
Spartans	0	0	0	14	14

at Clarence T. C. Ching Athletics Complex • Honolulu, Hawaii

- Date: December 23, 2023
- Game time: 5:30 p.m. HST
- Game weather: Sunny • Temperature: 74 °F (23 °C) • Wind: 15 mph (24 km/h) NE
- Game attendance: 7,089
- Referee: Greg Sujack
- TV announcers (ESPN): John Schriffen (play-by-play), Orlando Franklin (analyst), and Marilyn Payne (sideline)
- Box score

Game information

First Quarter

- (3:16) CCU – Matt Alaimo 2 yard pass from Ethan Vasko, Kade Hensley kick (Drive: 11 plays, 80 yards, 5:24; Coastal Carolina 7–0)

Second Quarter

No scoring

Third Quarter

- (3:19) CCU – Kendall Karr 2 yard pass from Ethan Vasko, Kade Hensley kick (Drive: 11 plays, 87 yards, 5:25; Coastal Carolina 14–0)

Fourth Quarter

- (14:16) CCU – Kade Hensley 49 yard field goal (Drive: 8 plays, 34 yards, 3:31; Coastal Carolina 17–0)
- (12:27) SJSU – Sam Olson 35 yard pass from Chevan Cordeiro, Kyler Halvorsen kick (Drive: 5 plays, 75 yards, 1:49; Coastal Carolina 17–7)
- (8:30) SJSU – Quali Conley 12 yard run, Kyler Halvorsen kick (Drive: 6 plays, 61 yards, 2:22; Coastal Carolina 17–14)
- (2:43) CCU – Sam Pinckney 8 yard pass from Ethan Vasko, Kade Hensley kick (Drive: 10 plays, 75 yards, 5:47; Coastal Carolina 24–14)

Win Probability

Line

Over/Under

Statistics	CCU	SJSU
First downs	20	21
Plays–yards	73–348	55–369
Rushes–yards	40–149	25–159
Passing yards	199	215
Passing: comp–att–int	20–33–0	16–30–0
Time of possession	37:11	22:49

Team	Category	Player	Statistics
Coastal Carolina	Passing	Ethan Vasko	20/33, 199 yards, 3 TD
Coastal Carolina	Rushing	Ethan Vasko	17 carries, 50 yards
Coastal Carolina	Receiving	Sam Pinckney	8 receptions, 123 yards, 1 TD
San Jose State	Passing	Chevan Cordeiro	16/30, 215 yards, 1 TD
San Jose State	Rushing	Kairee Robinson	12 carries, 67 yards
San Jose State	Receiving	Sam Olson	4 receptions, 96 yards, 1 TD

== Rankings ==
On November 26, San Jose State received a vote in the Coaches Poll for the first time since Week 7 of 2022.

Ranking movements Legend: ██ Increase in ranking ██ Decrease in ranking — = Not ranked RV = Received votes
	Week															
Poll	Pre	1	2	3	4	5	6	7	8	9	10	11	12	13	14	Final
AP	—	—	—	—	—	—	—	—	—	—	—	—	—	—	—	—
Coaches	—	—	—	—	—	—	—	—	—	—	—	—	—	—	RV	—
CFP	Not released									—	—	—	—	—	—	Not released
