= Derrick Odum =

American football player and coach (born 1970)

Current position
- Title: Defensive backs coach
- Team: Utah
- Conference: Big 12

Biographical details
- Born: April 22, 1970 (age 56); Baltimore, Maryland, U.S.
- Education: University of Utah (BS, MS)

Playing career
- 1988–1992: Utah
- Positions: Safety, cornerback

Coaching career (HC unless noted)
- 1995–1997: Utah (GA)
- 1998–1999: Montana (DB)
- 2000–2002: Utah State (DB)
- 2003–2004: Houston (DB)
- 2005–2007: Utah (DB)
- 2008–2014: SMU (DB)
- 2015–2016: Oregon State (DB)
- 2017: San Jose State (DC)
- 2018–2025: San Jose State (AHC/DC)
- 2026–present: Utah (DB)

Derrick Alexander Odum (born April 22, 1970) is an American college football coach and former college football player. He is the Defensive backs/Safeties coach for the Utah Utes football team.

== Early life ==
Odum was born in Baltimore. He attended Woodbridge High School in Irvine, California, and played on school's football, basketball, and baseball teams. Odum played football as a wide receiver, cornerback, quarterback, and defensive back and basketball as a guard. In Odum's senior season in 1987, he played a role in winning the high school a conference championship and, subsequently, won first-team Desert-Mountain Conference All-CIF Team defensive honors, All CIF Southern Section defensive player honors, and Cal-Hi Sports' all-state defensive player honors. He was invited to and played in the 29th annual Orange County all-star game team at LeBard Stadium. Odum graduated from Woodbridge High School in 1988, and signed his National Letter of Intent to play for the Utah Utes football team.

== College years ==
During his freshman year at Utah, Odum started his first game as a safety against fourth-ranked Nebraska. In his senior year, he switched to become a starting cornerback.

Odum also played on the Utah Utes baseball team in 1992 and 1993 as a pinch hitter, utility player, and outfielder.

Odum graduated from the University of Utah with a Bachelor's degree in political science in 1993, and went on to become a pharmaceutical consultant at SmithKline Beecham Clinical Laboratories in 1994.

== Coaching career ==
Odum was a Graduate assistant for Utah from 1995 to 1997, under head coach Ron McBride, and graduated with a master's degree in sport psychology in 1998.

Since obtaining his master's degree and prior to receiving his first defensive coordinator job, Odum has spent most of his coaching career as a defensive backs coach for Montana from 1998 to 1999, Utah State from 2000 to 2002, Houston from 2003 to 2004, Utah from 2005 to 2007. SMU from 2008 to 2014, and Oregon State from 2015 to 2016.

In 2017, Odum became the defensive coordinator at San Jose State under first-time head coach Brent Brennan. He was then promoted to associate head coach in 2018. Odum was relieved of his duties on November 17, 2025 after a 55–10 blowout loss to Nevada. Odum is San Jose State's longest tenured defensive coordinator in program history with 9 seasons.

In January 2026, Odum returned to Utah for his second stint as the team's defensive backs coach, under head coach Morgan Scalley.

== Personal life ==
Odum married Ania Terese Homan in 2001. The couple has two sons, one of whom plays baseball at San José State, and one daughter.
