= 2023 Hawaii Bowl =

Postseason college football bowl game

2023 EasyPost Hawaii Bowl
- 20th Hawaii Bowl
Coastal Carolina Chanticleers	San Jose State Spartans
(7–5)	(7–5)
Sun Belt	MW
24	14
Head coach: Tim Beck	Head coach: Brent Brennan
	1	2	3	4	Total
Coastal Carolina	7	0	7	10	24
San Jose State	0	0	0	14	14
- Date: December 23, 2023
- Season: 2023
- Stadium: Clarence T. C. Ching Athletics Complex
- Location: Honolulu, Hawaii
- MVP: Ethan Vasko (QB, Coastal Carolina)
- Favorite: San Jose State by 9.5
- Referee: Greg Sujack (MAC)
- Attendance: 7,089

United States TV coverage
- Network: ESPN; ESPN Radio
- Announcers: John Schriffen (play-by-play), Orlando Franklin (analyst), and Marilyn Payne (sideline) (ESPN); Kevin Winter (play-by-play) and Trevor Matich (analyst) (ESPN Radio)

International TV coverage
- Network: ESPN Deportes

The 2023 Hawaii Bowl was a college football bowl game played on December 23, 2023, at Clarence T. C. Ching Athletics Complex in Honolulu, Hawaii. The 20th annual Hawaii Bowl featured the Coastal Carolina Chanticleers of the Sun Belt Conference and the San Jose State Spartans of the Mountain West Conference. The game began at approximately 6:30 p.m. HST and was aired on ESPN. The Hawaii Bowl was one of the 2023–24 bowl games concluding the 2023 FBS football season. The game was sponsored by shipping API EasyPost and was officially known as the EasyPost Hawaii Bowl.

== Teams ==
The game featured the Coastal Carolina Chanticleers from the Sun Belt Conference and the San Jose State Spartans from the Mountain West Conference. This was the first time Coastal Carolina and San Jose State played each other, and the first time either team played in the Hawaii Bowl.

=== Coastal Carolina ===
The Chanticleers opened their regular season with a 27–13 loss on the road at UCLA. After winning two home games, they lost their next two games, against Georgia State and Georgia Southern, to fall to 2–3. However, a win on the road against Appalachian State started a five-game winning streak to reach 7–3 and clinch bowl eligibility. The Chanticleers finished the regular season at 7–5 after losing to James Madison in their final game, 56–14.

=== San Jose State ===
The Spartans lost five of their first six regular-season games to open the year at 1–5, including losses to USC, Oregon State, and Toledo, each of which appeared in the College Football Playoff rankings late in the season. San Jose State then ended their regular season on a six-game winning streak, clinching bowl eligibility with a 24–13 win over San Diego State on November 18.

== Game summary ==
2023 EasyPost Hawaii Bowl

Quarter	1	2	3	4	Total
Coastal Carolina	7	0	7	10	24
San Jose State	0	0	0	14	14

at Clarence T. C. Ching Athletics Complex • Honolulu, Hawaii

- Date: Saturday, December 23, 2023
- Game time: 5:30 p.m. HST
- Game weather: Sunny • Temperature: 74 °F (23 °C) • Wind: 15 mph (24 km/h) NE
- Game attendance: 7,089
- Referee: Greg Sujack
- TV announcers (ESPN): John Schriffen (play-by-play), Orlando Franklin (analyst), and Marilyn Payne (sideline)
- Box score

Game information

First Quarter

- (3:16) CCU – Matt Alaimo 2 yard pass from Ethan Vasko, Kade Hensley kick (Drive: 11 plays, 80 yards, 5:24; Coastal Carolina 7–0)

Second Quarter

No scoring

Third Quarter

- (3:19) CCU – Kendall Karr 2 yard pass from Ethan Vasko, Kade Hensley kick (Drive: 11 plays, 87 yards, 5:25; Coastal Carolina 14–0)

Fourth Quarter

- (14:16) CCU – Kade Hensley 49 yard field goal (Drive: 8 plays, 34 yards, 3:31; Coastal Carolina 17–0)
- (12:27) SJSU – Sam Olson 35 yard pass from Chevan Cordeiro, Kyler Halvorsen kick (Drive: 5 plays, 75 yards, 1:49; Coastal Carolina 17–7)
- (8:30) SJSU – Quali Conley 12 yard run, Kyler Halvorsen kick (Drive: 6 plays, 61 yards, 2:22; Coastal Carolina 17–14)
- (2:43) CCU – Sam Pinckney 8 yard pass from Ethan Vasko, Kade Hensley kick (Drive: 10 plays, 75 yards, 5:47; Coastal Carolina 24–14)

=== Statistics ===
Statistics	CCU	SJSU
First downs	20	21
Plays–yards	73–348	55–369
Rushes–yards	40–149	25–159
Passing yards	199	215
Passing: comp–att–int	20–33–0	16–30–0
Time of possession	37:11	22:49

Team	Category	Player	Statistics
Coastal Carolina	Passing	Ethan Vasko	20/33, 199 yards, 3 TD
Coastal Carolina	Rushing	Ethan Vasko	17 carries, 50 yards
Coastal Carolina	Receiving	Sam Pinckney	8 receptions, 123 yards, 1 TD
San Jose State	Passing	Chevan Cordeiro	16/30, 215 yards, 1 TD
San Jose State	Rushing	Kairee Robinson	12 carries, 67 yards
San Jose State	Receiving	Sam Olson	4 receptions, 96 yards, 1 TD
