= San Jose State Spartans football =

Football team of San Jose State University

San Jose State Spartans
2026 San Jose State Spartans football team
- First season: 1892; 134 years ago
- Athletic director: Jeff Konya
- Head coach: Ken Niumatalolo; 3rd season, 10–16 (.385)
- Location: San Jose, California
- Stadium: CEFCU Stadium (capacity: 18,203)
- NCAA division: Division I FBS
- Conference: Mountain West
- Colors: Gold, white, and blue
- All-time record: 520–539–38 (.491)
- Bowl record: 7–7 (.500)

Conference championships
- FWC: 1932, 1934 CCAA: 1939, 1940, 1941, 1946, 1948, 1949 PCAA: 1975, 1976, 1978 Big West: 1981, 1986, 1987, 1990, 1991 MW: 2020
- Consensus All-Americans: 1
- Rivalries: Fresno State (rivalry); Stanford (rivalry); Hawai'i (rivalry); Pacific (rivalry); San Diego State; Nevada

Uniforms
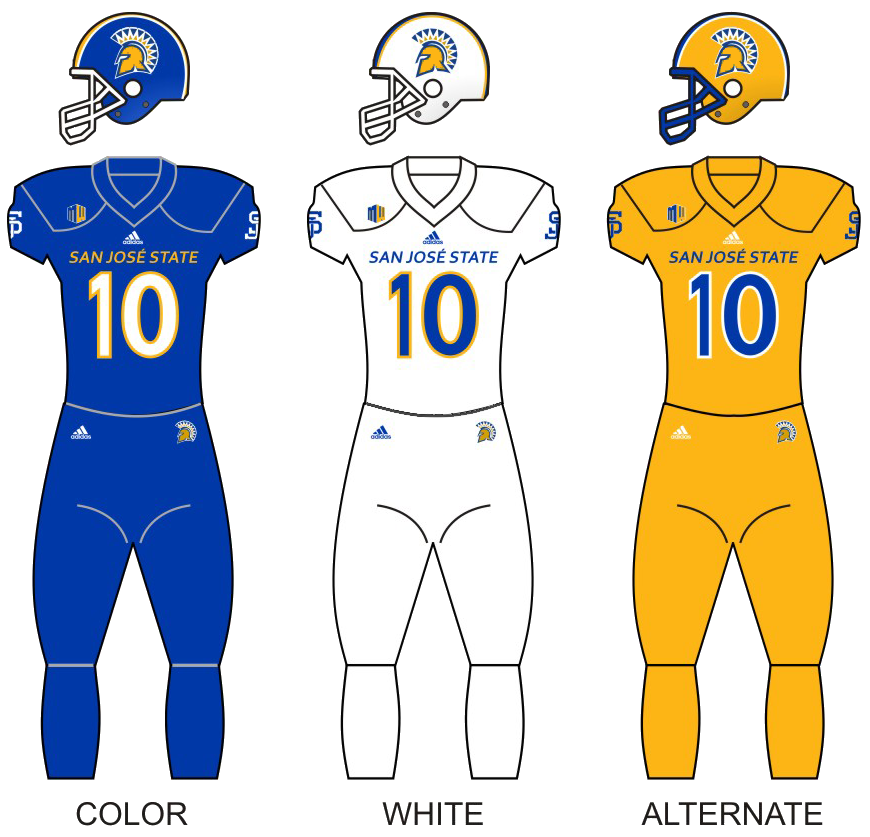
- Mascot: Sammy Spartan
- Outfitter: Under Armour
- Website: sjsuspartans.com

The San Jose State Spartans football team represents San José State University in NCAA Division I FBS college football as a member of the Mountain West Conference. Since its first regular season in 1898, the team has produced over 90 All-America team members, won 18 conference championships, and sent 139 players to the NFL, including Pro Football Hall of Fame inductees Bill Walsh and Dick Vermeil. The Spartans head coach is Ken Niumatalolo.

San Jose State plays their home games in CEFCU Stadium (built in 1933 as Spartan Stadium), and regional rivalries include Fresno State, Stanford, Hawai'i, and San Diego State.

== History ==
=== Early history (1892–1970) ===
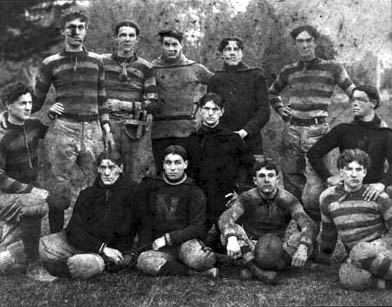
The State Normal School at San Jose football team in 1910. Jerseys display a large "N" for "Normal"

San Jose State first fielded a football team in 1892 which did not have a coach. In their first year fielding an American football team, the Spartans lost in their sole contest against the local YMCA team of San Jose. The game technically occurred during 1893, but it represented the 1892 academic year and so that is the season it is counted. In 1893, James E. Addicott started to serve as the head coach. Addicott also served as a math professor at the California State Normal School (now San José State University). The team played a local YMCA club in 1893 and 1894 and garnered its first tie in 1896, a 6–6 decision against nearby rival College of the Pacific.

The first regular football seasons began in 1898 and mostly consisted of games against local high schools and some colleges and junior colleges.

During the 1920s the football program began playing home games at "Spartan Field," future home of Spartan Stadium. In the 1930s and 1940s, the Spartan football program was considered a powerhouse, posting 12 consecutive winning seasons and earning eight conference championship titles over an 18-year span. The 1932 and 1939 teams went 7–0–2 and 13–0 respectively, the only undefeated seasons in school history.

San Jose State first appeared in the national rankings in 1939 when the AP Poll ranked the Spartans No. 19 in week seven. The team would climb to No. 18 in week eight. Lloyd Thomas was the first San Jose State player to receive first-team All-America honors. Thomas played as a defensive end on the 1936, 1937 and 1938 teams that fielded a combined win-loss record of 27–7–1. As of 2022, SJSU has produced over 90 All-America team members, including seven first-team selections.

Spartan Stadium (now known as CEFCU Stadium) was built on the original Spartan Field site and completed in 1933 with a capacity of 18,000. The Spartans won the first football game played in the stadium 44–6 over San Francisco State on October 7, 1933.

The San Jose State Spartans football team served unexpectedly with the Honolulu Police Department during World War II. The team had just arrived in Hawaii to play a series of post-season bowl games against Hawaii and the Willamette University Bearcats when the U.S. Navy base at Pearl Harbor was attacked on December 7, 1941. The team was stranded on the islands for a number of weeks following the attack, and players were employed by the local police department to help improve island defenses against a possible Japanese amphibious assault and as guards for military bases on the island.

The Spartan football program posted just six winning seasons in the 1950s and 1960s, but the 1970s would usher in a string of successful seasons spanning 20 years.

=== Winning era (1971–1992) ===
From 1971 to 1992, San Jose State posted 15 winning seasons, won eight conference titles, appeared in four bowl games and sent nearly 50 players to the NFL.

SJSU's first win over a nationally ranked opponent occurred in 1971 when the Spartans defeated No. 10 Stanford 13–12 on November 13. Stanford would go on to defeat Michigan in the Rose Bowl that season. SJSU's second win over a ranked opponent occurred four years later in 1975, when the Spartans defeated No. 15 Stanford 36–34 in a nationally televised game on September 27. San Jose State also had victories over No. 10 Baylor in 1980, No. 19 Fresno State in 1986, and No. 23 Fresno State in 1990.

From 1971 to 1992, SJSU garnered 23 victories over current Power Five conference opponents. These victories included eight wins over Stanford, five wins over Cal and three over Oregon.

In 1975, San Jose State appeared in the national rankings for the first time in over 30 years when the team was ranked No. 20 in the AP Poll in week 13. SJSU later earned its first post-season national ranking in 1990 when the Spartans finished No. 20 in the Coaches Poll.

Two stadium expansions and renovations in the 1980s increased the Spartan Stadium seating capacity from 18,000 to 31,218.

=== Decline (1993–2004) ===
From 1993 to 2004, San Jose State had just one winning season when the team finished 7–5 in 2000; however, the team did earn two wins over ranked opponents during this period. The Spartans claimed a 25–22 victory over No. 24 Air Force in 1997 and a 27–24 win over No. 9 TCU in a nationally televised game in 2000. The Spartans also defeated rival Stanford three consecutive years from 1998 to 2000.

By the spring of 2004, the combination of rising costs for the football program and budget cuts from the state led some San Jose State faculty members to advocate dropping football.

In 2004, San Jose State defeated the Rice Owls 70–63 in a game that set the NCAA Division I record for total points scored and total touchdowns in a non-overtime game.

=== Dick Tomey era (2005–2009) ===
Coach Dick Tomey took over the program in 2005 amid Academic Progress Rate (APR) shortcomings that would result in severe penalties imposed by the NCAA. After showing moderate improvement that year, the Spartans had a breakout season in 2006. It was the team's best season since joining the WAC ten years prior. Tomey guided the Spartans to a 9–4 record, a win over rival Fresno State, and a win over New Mexico in the 2006 New Mexico Bowl, thus ending the team's 16-year bowl drought. The 2006 Spartan squad produced two 2007 NFL draft picks in wide receivers James Jones and John Broussard.

From 2007 through the 2009 seasons, the program was hit with heavy NCAA sanctions for failing to meet APR standards. By the start of the 2009 season, the Spartans had lost 57 scholarships over a four-year period. By the spring of 2010, the NCAA penalties were lifted and a full complement of 85 scholarships was restored.

The 2007 team was not as successful as the previous year's team, with the Spartans finishing 5–7 and fifth in the WAC. The post-season showed a positive result, however, with several players being named to all-star games including Dwight Lowery, Marcus Teland, Matt Castelo and Adam Tafralis. The Spartans produced another draft pick in the 2008 NFL draft, in defensive back Dwight Lowery. Lowery was named a 1st-team All-America winner in 2007.

The 2008 roster gave the school its best start since joining the WAC. The Spartans jumped to 5–2 and led the WAC for three weeks until losing to Boise State. The Spartans finished the season in sixth place in the WAC with a conference record of 4–4 and a 6–6 overall record. Three players were picked in the 2009 NFL draft, those being defensive tackle Jarron Gilbert, defensive back Christopher Owens and defensive back Coye Francies

After playing an unusually tough non-conference schedule, the 2009 Spartans finished 2–10 with wins over Cal Poly and New Mexico State. Head Coach Dick Tomey announced in November he would retire at the close of the season, thus ending his legendary coaching career. Tomey's record at SJSU was 25–35.

=== Mike MacIntyre era (2010–2012) ===
On December 17, 2009, Mike MacIntyre was formally introduced as Tomey's replacement. MacIntyre was previously the defensive coordinator at Duke University.

San Jose State finished 1–12 in 2010 and 5–7 in 2011 under MacIntyre. In MacIntyre's third season, the 2012 San Jose State Spartans football team finished 11–2 including a win over Bowling Green in the 2012 Military Bowl. The 2012 team earned top-25 post-season rankings in the Associated Press (AP), Coaches and BCS polls. Kent Baer served as interim head coach for the Military Bowl because MacIntyre resigned to accept the head coach position at Colorado.

=== Ron Caragher era (2013–2016) ===
Ron Caragher, previously the head coach at the University of San Diego, became the SJSU head coach following the conclusion of the 2012 football season. Caragher's team finished a disappointing 6–6 in 2013, however, that season did include a 62–52 upset win over No. 16 Fresno State to close out the year. The team finished 3–9 in 2014, 6–7 in 2015 and 4–8 in 2016. On November 27, 2016, Caragher was relieved of his duties as head coach after compiling a 19–30 (.388) win-loss record and only one bowl appearance over four seasons.

=== Brent Brennan era (2017–2023) ===
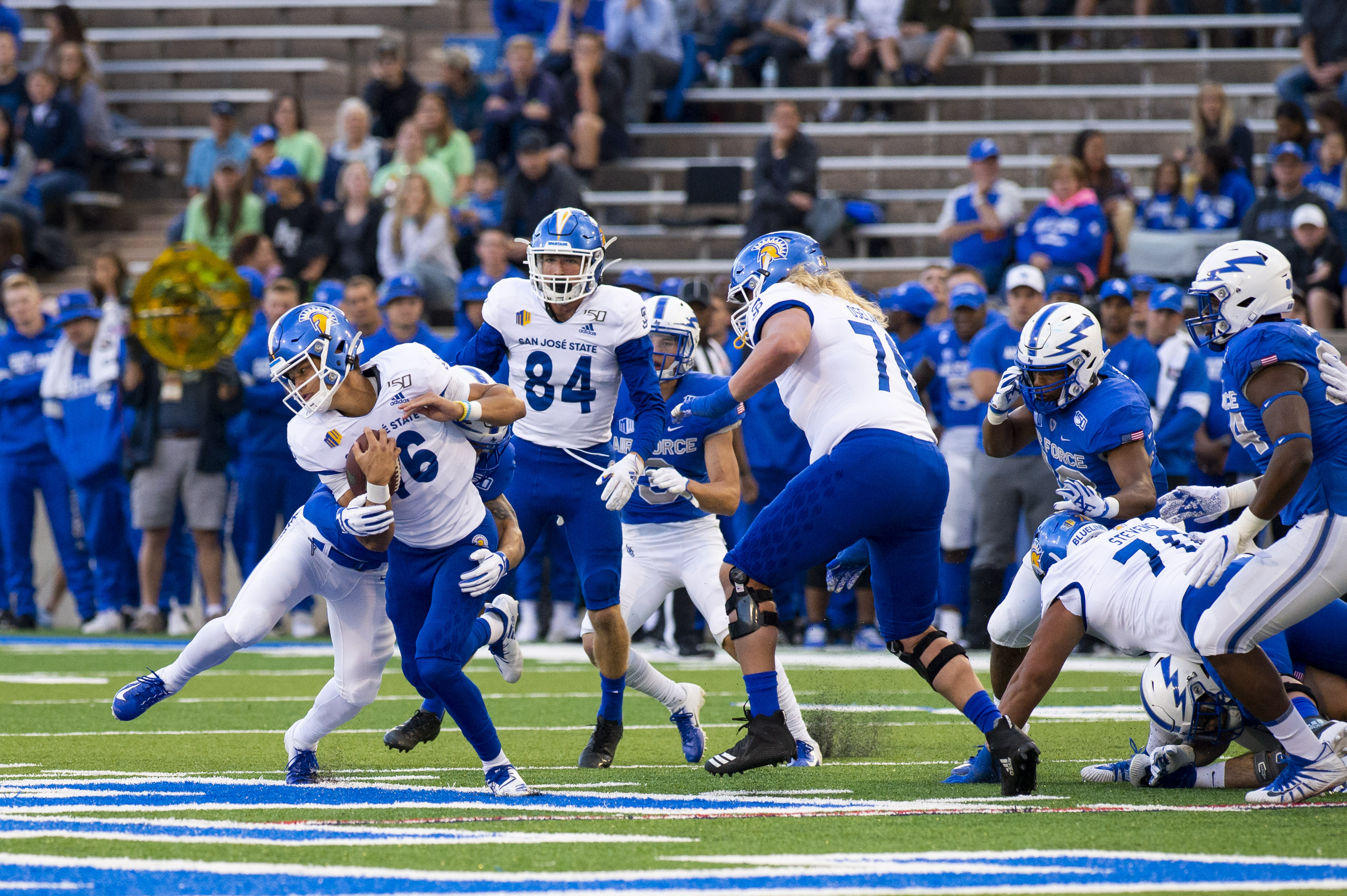
San Jose State facing off against Air Force in 2019

Oregon State wide receivers coach Brent Brennan, who was a San Jose State assistant under Tomey and MacIntyre from 2005 to 2010, took over as head coach in 2017.

In Brennan's first two years as head coach, the Spartans won just three games. This included a 1–11 season in 2018. Despite the poor record, five of the team's losses in 2018 were by fewer than nine points. Three of those losses were by a field goal, including a 5 overtime 44–41 loss to the Hawaii Rainbow Warriors on September 29, 2018.

The 2019 team improved to 5–7, missing bowl eligibility by one win. The Spartans also showed promise by defeating Arkansas on the road in 2019 for the program's first win over a Southeastern Conference team. Additionally, the 2019 Spartan team defeated Army, making the Spartans one of only 20 teams in college football to defeat all three FBS service academies (Army, Air Force, and Navy). Brennan received a contract extension at the close of the 2019 season.

The COVID-19 pandemic impacted the 2020 season, with restrictions imposed by Santa Clara County prompting the team to conduct preseason practice at Humboldt State University. The pandemic also resulted in the cancellation of all four non-conference games and two games against Mountain West Conference opponents. Santa Clara County public health orders also forced the Spartans' last two home games to be relocated to Aloha Stadium in Hawaii and Sam Boyd Stadium in Las Vegas.

The abbreviated 2020 campaign would be a breakout year for the Spartans, who won each of their six regular season games for their first 6–0 start since 1939. The Spartans also cracked the AP Poll top-25 for the first time since 2012 and debuted in the College Football Playoff ranking at No. 24.

The Spartans qualified for the Mountain West Conference championship game for the first time, where they defeated Boise State 34–20. In addition to giving San Jose State its maiden win over Boise State, the victory gave the Spartans their first conference championship title since 1991. Brennan was named the Mountain West Conference Coach of the Year and also received the 2020 Lombardi Foundation national Coach of the Year award.

In 2023, the Spartans, along with Boise State and UNLV, finished tied for first in the conference standings. All three teams finished 6–2 in conference play, but the Spartans were left out of the MWC championship game after a computer tiebreaker placed UNLV and Boise State higher in the rankings.

In January 2024, Brennan left San Jose State to join the Arizona Wildcats as head coach.

=== Ken Niumatalolo era (2024–present) ===
Ken Niumatalolo took over as head coach on January 21, 2024, becoming the 30th head football coach in the program's history. Niumatalolo was previously the head coach at Navy and won a program-best 109 games, appeared in ten bowl games over 15 seasons, and was a three-time American Athletic Conference (AAC) Coach of the Year (2015, 2016, 2019). In his first year, he led the Spartans to a bowl eligible 7–5 season, and earned San Jose State its first consensus All-American in Nick Nash.

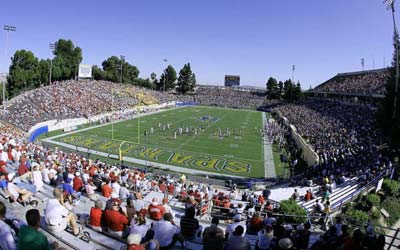
SJSU home football game at Spartan Stadium

== Conference affiliations ==
The San Jose State football team has been affiliated with six different athletic conferences since joining the California Coast Conference in 1922.

- Independent (1893–1921)
- California Coast Conference (1922–1928)
- Far Western Conference (1929–1935)
- Independent (1936–1938)
- California Collegiate Athletic Association (1939–1949)
- Independent (1950–1968)
- Pacific Coast Athletic Association / Big West Conference (1969–1995)
- Western Athletic Conference (1996–2012)
- Mountain West Conference (2013–present)

== Conference championships ==
San Jose State has won 17 conference championships. From 1969 to 1995, San Jose State earned more Big West Conference football championship titles than any other team in the history of the Big West Conference. The Spartans moved to the WAC in 1996 and later moved to the Mountain West Conference in 2013.

Year	Conference	Coach	Overall Record	Conference Record
1932†	Far Western Conference	Dudley DeGroot	7–0–2	3–0–2
1934†	Far Western Conference	Dudley DeGroot	3–3–4	2–0–3
1939	California Collegiate Athletic Association	Dudley DeGroot	13–0	3–0
1940	California Collegiate Athletic Association	Ben Winkelman	11–1	3–0
1941†	California Collegiate Athletic Association	Ben Winkelman	5–3–3	2–0–1
1946	California Collegiate Athletic Association	Bill Hubbard	9–1–1	4–0
1948	California Collegiate Athletic Association	Bill Hubbard	9–3	5–0
1949	California Collegiate Athletic Association	Bill Hubbard	9–4	4–0
1975	Pacific Coast Athletic Association	Darryl Rogers	9–2	5–0
1976	Pacific Coast Athletic Association	Lynn Stiles	7–4	4–0
1978†	Pacific Coast Athletic Association	Lynn Stiles	7–5	4–1
1981	Big West Conference	Jack Elway	9–3	5–0
1986	Big West Conference	Claude Gilbert	10–2	7–0
1987	Big West Conference	Claude Gilbert	10–2	7–0
1990	Big West Conference	Terry Shea	9–2–1	7–0
1991†	Big West Conference	Terry Shea	6–4–1	6–1
2020	Mountain West Conference	Brent Brennan	7–1	7–0

† Co–champions

== Bowl games ==
San Jose State has made 14 bowl appearances and has an overall bowl game record of 7–7. Their most recent bowl appearance was on December 24, 2024, when they faced the South Florida Bulls in the 2024 Hawaii Bowl in Honolulu, Hawaii.

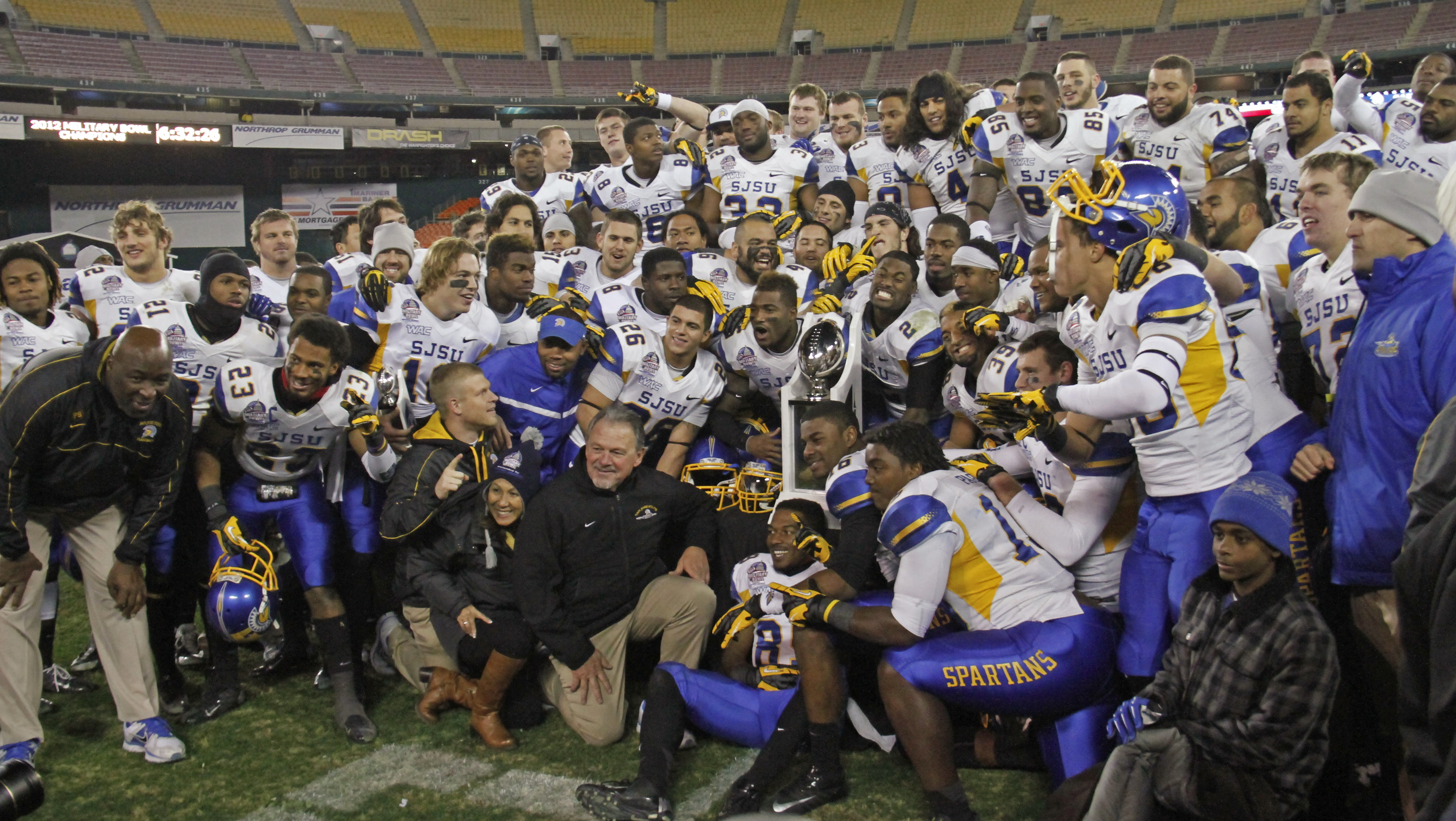
The Spartans pose with the trophy at the 2012 Military Bowl

Season	Coach	Bowl	Opponent	Result
1946	Bill Hubbard	Raisin Bowl	Utah State	W 20–0
1949	Bill Hubbard	Raisin Bowl	Texas Tech	W 20–13
1971	Dewey King	Pasadena Bowl	Memphis	L 9–28
1981	Jack Elway	California Bowl	Toledo	L 25–27
1986	Claude Gilbert	California Bowl	Miami (OH)	W 37–7
1987	Claude Gilbert	California Bowl	Eastern Michigan	L 27–30
1990	Terry Shea	California Bowl	Central Michigan	W 48–24
2006	Dick Tomey	New Mexico Bowl	New Mexico	W 20–12
2012	Kent Baer	Military Bowl	Bowling Green	W 29–20
2015	Ron Caragher	Cure Bowl	Georgia State	W 27–16
2020	Brent Brennan	Arizona Bowl	Ball State	L 13–34
2022	Brent Brennan	Famous Idaho Potato Bowl	Eastern Michigan	L 27–41
2023	Brent Brennan	Hawaii Bowl	Coastal Carolina	L 14–24
2024	Ken Niumatalolo	Hawaii Bowl	South Florida	L 39–41 ^{5OT}

== Home stadium ==
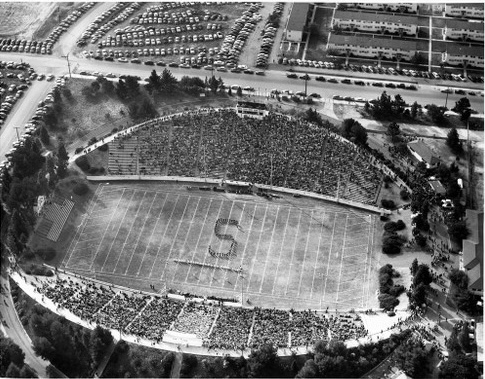
Spartan Stadium, 1950s

Known as Spartan Stadium for over eight decades, CEFCU stadium officially opened in 1933 as a 4,000-seat facility. The stadium featured large berms on the east, west, north and south sides of the field, which gave the stadium a "sunken bowl" appearance. The stadium's seating capacity was increased to 8,500 in 1936, and later expanded incrementally to a total seating capacity of just over 18,000 by 1948. The most recent additions came in the 1980s when the capacity of the stadium was expanded from approximately 18,000 to just over 31,000 by adding end zone bleachers, an upper deck and boxes on the west side.

In 1998, the field was widened and other renovations were carried out for the MLS San Jose Earthquakes soccer team in accordance with official FIFA regulations. As a result of these renovations, parts of the stands closest to the playing field were removed, thus lowering available seating for all sports to 30,456.

In August 2016, Citizens Equity First Credit Union purchased sole naming rights to Spartan Stadium for $8.7 million. The deal between CEFCU and San José State University will last for 15 years.

In 2019, seating capacity was temporarily reduced to 21,520 as part of a massive east-side stadium renovation project. Phase I of the project, which included construction of the $70 million Spartan Athletic Center, was completed in August 2023. Phase II, which is tentatively slated to include installation of premium spectator seating on the stadium's east side, remains in the planning stages as of 2023.

Other distinctive and unique features of the stadium include the original 1933 Romanesque balustrade spanning the entire east and west sidelines, and the CEFCU Stadium "Ring of Honor" displayed along the west side upper deck.

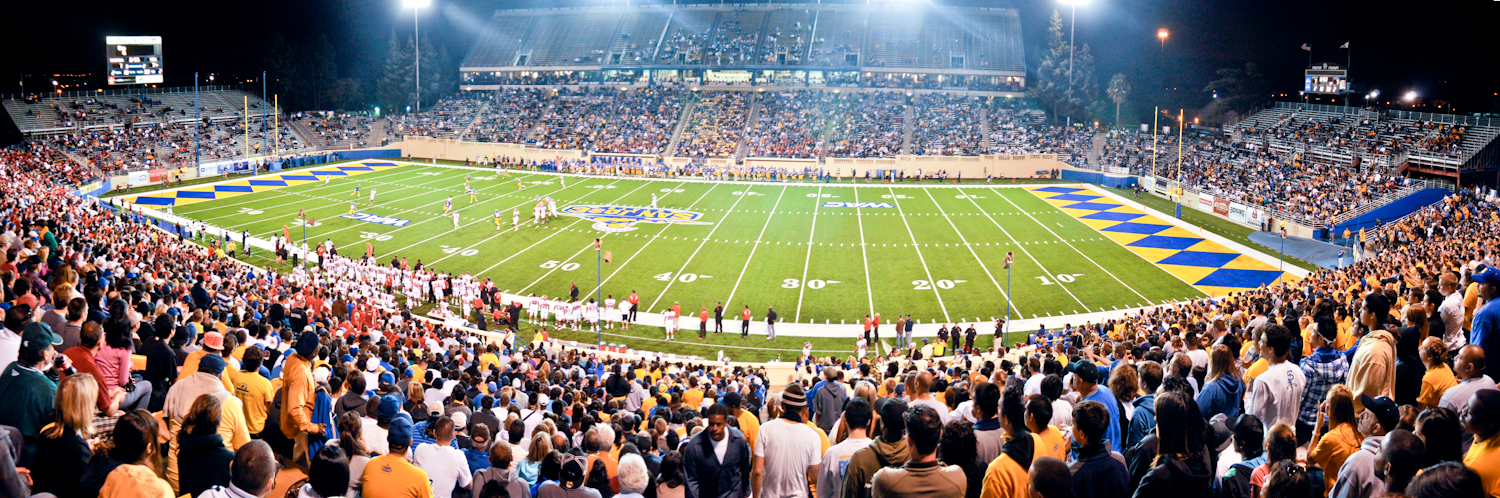
Utah at San Jose State at Spartan Stadium in 2009

== Rivalries ==
=== Fresno State ===
The Battle for the Valley

San Jose State's biggest rival is California State University, Fresno, due in large part to the two schools' geographic proximity and long history of competing in the same conferences.

Fresno is the largest city in the agriculturally rich San Joaquin Valley. San Jose is the largest city in the metropolitan capital of the high-tech Silicon Valley. The two schools are separated by approximately 150 driving miles. Beginning in 2013, the winner of the game is awarded the Valley Trophy.

San Jose State led the series from 1949 to 2001, but Fresno State tied it at 32–32–3 with a victory in 2002 and recaptured the lead in 2003. The Bulldogs and Spartans first played each other in 1921.

As of 2024, Fresno State leads the football series 45–39–3. The two schools have met on the gridiron 87 times.

=== Stanford ===
Bill Walsh Legacy Game

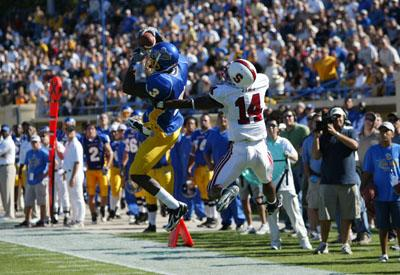
James Jones catches a touchdown pass against Stanford in 2006 in the Bill Walsh Legacy Game

The Bill Walsh Legacy Game is the name given to the rivalry between the Spartans and the Stanford Cardinal football team of Stanford University.

In 2007, following the death of San Jose State alumnus and former Stanford coach Bill Walsh, the near-annual game played between the two schools was renamed the Bill Walsh Legacy Game.

The rivalry is rooted in the two schools' close geographical proximity to one another, with the Stanford University campus being located just 23 driving miles northwest of the San Jose State campus on Interstate 280. The two teams have played each other 69 times since 1900. Stanford and San Jose State announced an agreement to renew the rivalry with a six-game home-and-home series beginning in 2024. San Jose State won the first of the renewed 6-game match-ups 34–31 in dramatic fashion against the Cardinal at CEFCU Stadium on the Friday after Thanksgiving, November 29, 2024. The following year, in 2025, Stanford won the rivalry game 30–29, in dramatic fashion, scoring the winning touchdown with only 19 seconds left in the game.

Stanford currently leads the series 53–15–1.

=== Hawai'i ===
Dick Tomey Legacy Game

The two schools first met in 1936, and each team was previously led by legendary coach Dick Tomey. Tomey was a successful head coach at Hawaii from 1977 to 1986 and was a successful head coach at San Jose State from 2005 to 2009. The winner of the rivalry game each year takes possession of the Dick Tomey Legacy Trophy. The Rainbow Warriors and Spartans have played each other 47 times as of the 2025 season.

In 1941, the San Jose State Spartans football team served unexpectedly with the Honolulu Police Department during World War II. The team had just arrived in Hawaii to play a series of postseason bowl games against the Hawaii Rainbow Warriors and the Willamette University Bearcats when the U.S. Navy base at Pearl Harbor was attacked on December 7, 1941. The team was stranded on the islands for a number of weeks following the attack, and players were employed by the local police department to help improve island defenses against a possible Japanese amphibious assault and as guards for military bases on the island.

As of 2025, the Spartans have won 5 in a row in the series and lead the series 24-22–1.

=== San Diego State ===
El Camino Real Rivalry

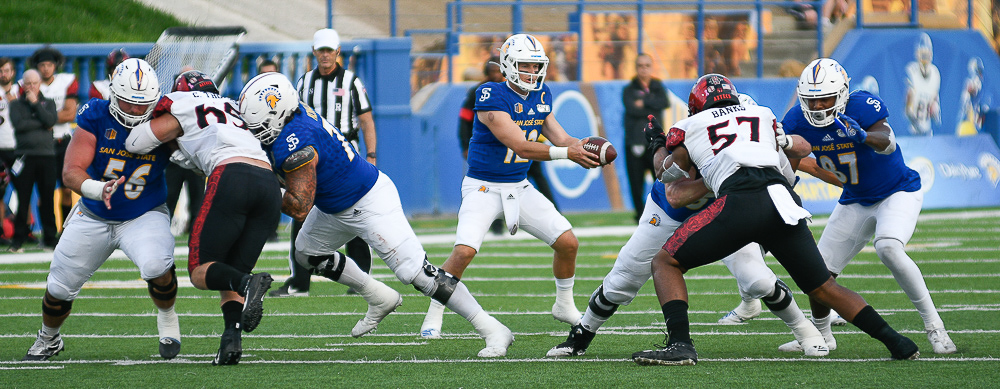
San Jose State battles San Diego State at CEFCU Stadium in 2019.

The rivalry between the two Cal State schools dates back to 1935. The matchup is named after the historic 600-mile Camino Real that connects the 21 Spanish missions in California, stretching from San Diego Bay in the south to San Francisco Bay in the north. The San Diego State Aztecs and San Jose State Spartans have played each other 47 times as of the 2023 season.

In 2014, there were conversations between the two programs about creating a trophy using an old mission bell or a replica of an old Spanish mission bell to be awarded to the winner of the rivalry game, but no trophy ever materialized.

The Spartans currently have the longest win streak in the series with 11 consecutive wins from 1938 to 1952.

As of 2023, San Diego State leads the series 24–22–2.

=== Nevada ===
The University of Nevada, Reno and San Jose State first played each other in 1899. The Wolf Pack won the first meeting 6–0 in Reno on Thanksgiving Day. Bob Brule scored the game's only touchdown and fell into an irrigation ditch behind the end zone, followed by three Cal State Normal School players.

The series was tied at seven wins apiece at the close of the 2001 season, but SJSU fell to 4–16 against Nevada over the following 20 seasons (2002–2022). The two schools did not play each other from 1901 to 1930 and again from 1949 to 1991.

The SJSU and Nevada campuses are located approximately 250 miles apart. The football teams have competed in the same conferences since 1992, first in the Big West Conference in the 1990s and then in the 2000s as members of the WAC. Since 2013, the two teams are West Division rivals in the Mountain West.

Both schools are the oldest public institutions of higher education in their respective states of California and Nevada. SJSU was founded in 1857 while UNR was founded in 1874.

As of 2024 Nevada leads the series 23–12–2.

=== University of the Pacific ===
Victory Bell

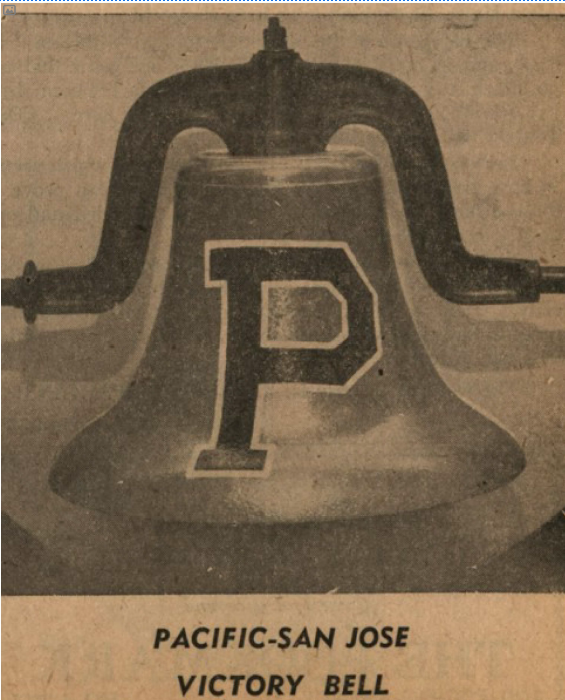
The Pacific-San Jose 'Victory Bell'

The now defunct, 100-year rivalry matchup between the SJSU Spartans and the Pacific Tigers began in 1895 and ended in 1995 when Pacific dropped its football program. The Spartan-Tiger football game was played 72 times between 1895 and 1995.

Due to the "private vs. public" institutional competitiveness and the close geographical proximity of the two schools, a natural "cross-town" rivalry was born. University of the Pacific was founded in 1851 in Santa Clara, California, and claims to be the first institution of higher education in California. San José State University was founded in 1857 and is California's first public institution of higher education.

In 1949, in a game which drew national attention, the "Victory Bell" was unveiled. The Victory Bell would go to the winner of subsequent Tiger-Spartan games. The bell was two feet tall and waist-high on a rolling cart. The bell was half black with an orange "P" for Pacific and half blue with a gold "SJ" for San Jose.

The Spartans led the series 43–23–6 when the rivalry ended at the close of the 1995 season.

== National poll rankings ==
San Jose State earned its first national ranking in 1939, reaching the 18th spot in the Associated Press college football poll. Since then, the school has spent eight weeks ranked among the top–25 college football teams in the AP poll, including two post–season top–25 rankings. In 2020, the team received a postseason ranking in the AP Poll (24), Coaches Poll (24), and the College Football Playoff Rankings (22).

Year	Weeks	Low	High	Final	Record
1939	2	19	18	NR	13–0
1975	1	20	20	NR	9–2
2012	2	24	21	21	11–2
2020	3	25	19	24	7–1

== Head coaches ==
San Jose State has had 29 head football coaches. There have been four periods in which the Spartans did not host a team (1894, 1896–1897, 1901–1920, 1943–1945).

Year	Coach	Pct.
1893	James E. Addicott	.000
1894	No Team	n/a
1895–1896	James E. Addicott	.500
1897	No Team	n/a
1898	James E. Addicott	.750
1899	Jess Woods	.688
1900	James E. Addicott	.417
1900	Fielding H. Yost (Interim)	1.000
1901–1920	No Team	n/a
1921–1922	David Wooster	.250
1923	H.C. McDonald (Interim)	.000
1924–1928	Ernesto R. Knollin	.378
1929–1931	Walter Crawford	.348
1932–1939	Dudley DeGroot	.736
1940–1941	Ben Winkelman	.761
1942	Glenn Hartranft	.778
1943–1945	No Team	n/a
1946–1949	Bill Hubbard	.761
1950–1956	Robert T. Bronzan	.515
1957–1964	Bob Titchenal	.424
1965–1968	Harry Anderson	.333
1969–1970	Joe McMullen	.231
1970–1972	Dewey King	.339
1973–1975	Darryl Rogers	.691
1976–1978	Lynn Stiles	.529
1979–1983	Jack Elway	.634
1984–1989	Claude Gilbert	.558
1990–1991	Terry Shea	.696
1992	Ron Turner	.636
1993–1996	John Ralston	.244
1997–2000	Dave Baldwin	.400
2001–2004	Fitz Hill	.298
2005–2009	Dick Tomey	.479
2010–2012	Mike MacIntyre	.432
2012	Kent Baer (Interim)	1.000
2013–2016	Ron Caragher	.388
2017–2023	Brent Brennan	.413
2024–present	Ken Niumatalolo	

== Individual awards and honors ==
=== National awards ===
==== Coaches ====
- American Football Coaches Association Region 5 Coach of the Year

Brent Brennan (2020)

- Amos Alonzo Stagg Award

Pop Warner (1948)
Bill Walsh (2008)
Dick Tomey (2020)

- Corbett Award

Bob Bronzan (2005)

- Lombardi Foundation Coach of the Year

Brent Brennan (2020)

- Walter Camp Distinguished American Award

Bill Walsh (2003)

Dick Vermeil (2006)

- Reds Bagnell Award

Dick Vermeil (2013)

==== Players ====
- Disney's Wide World of Sports Spirit Award

Neil Parry, KR/ PR (2003)

- National Football Foundation James J. Campbell National Scholar-Athlete Award

Tim Crawley, WR, RB, KR (2016)

- Pop Warner Memorial Trophy

Chon Gallegos, QB (1961)
Mike Perez, QB (1987)

- UPI Offensive Player of the Year

Mike Perez, QB (1986)

=== Conference awards ===
==== Mountain West Conference awards ====
- MWC Coach of the Year

Brent Brennan (2020)

- MWC Player of the Year

Jack Snyder, LT (2020)

- MWC Defensive Player of the Year

Cade Hall, DL (2020)
Viliami Fehoko, DL (2022)

- MWC Offensive Player of the Year

Josh Love, QB (2019)
Chevan Cordeiro, QB (2023) (*Pre-season award)

==== Western Athletic Conference awards ====
- WAC Defensive Player of the Year

Travis Johnson (2012)

- WAC Defensive Player of the Year

Jarron Gilbert (2008) (Co-DPOY with Hawaii's Solomon Elimimian)

==== Big West Conference awards ====
- Big West Coach of the Year

Terry Shea (1990)

- Big West Defensive Player of the Year

Lyneil Mayo, OLB (1990)

- Big West Offensive Player of the Year

Mike Perez, QB (1987)
Sheldon Canley, TB (1990)

== Retired numbers ==
San José State Spartans retired numbers
No.	Player	Pos.	Tenure	No. ret.	Ref.
52	Dave Chaney	LB	1969–1971	2019	

In 2019, Chaney was the first and thus far only Spartan to have his number retired. He was a two-time All-American linebacker who played for the Spartans from 1969 to 1971. In his three seasons, he established school career records for tackles, interception return yardage and interceptions returned for a touchdown. His 527 career tackles in just three seasons remains a SJSU record. Although Chaney was selected by the Kansas City Chiefs in 1972, he turned down the offer to pursue a career in education.

== All-Americans ==
As of 2024, SJSU has produced over 99 All-America team members, including nine first-team selections, 25 second-team and third-team selections, and over 65 honorable mentions. As of 2024, Nick Nash became the first Spartan player to ever earn both consensus and unanimous All-American honors.

Unanimous selections are indicated by a double asterisk (**) beside their name. Note: List below does not include honorable mention selections.

Year	Name	Position	Team	Ref
1938	Lloyd Thomas	E	AP 1st	
1939	Leroy Zimmerman	FB	AP 1st	
1970, 1971	Dave Chaney	LB	AP 1st, NEA 1st, UPI 2nd	
1974	Louie Wright	CB	AP 2nd	
1975	Kim Bokamper	DE	NEA-2nd	
1976	Wilson Faumuina	DT	AP 3rd	
1976	Vic Rakhshani	TE	FBN 1st	
1978	Frank Manumaleuga	LB	AP 3rd	
1981	Ken Thomas	DB	NEA 2nd	
1983	Eric Richardson	WR	NEA 2nd	
1987	Guy Liggins	WR	UPI 2nd	
1990	Sheldon Canley	TB	AP 3rd	
1991	Joe Nedney	PK	FBN 3rd	
1992	Brian Lundy	WR	FBN 1st	
1995	Brian Roche	TE	AP 2nd	
2000	Deoncé Whitaker	TB	TSN 3rd	
2002	Charles Pauley	Returns	CFBN 1st, AP 3rd	
2006, 2007	Dwight Lowery	CB	AFCA 1st, FWAA 1st, AP 3rd	
2010	Vince Buhagiar	LB	Phil Steele 3rd	
2010	Noel Grigsby	WR	Phil Steele 2nd	
2010	Keith Smith	LB	FWAA, CFBN 2nd, Phil Steele 3rd	
2010	Harrison Waid	P	Phil Steele 2nd	
2012	Travis Johnson	DE	CBS 3rd	
2012	Austin Lopez	PK	FWAA, CFBN 2nd	
2013	Tyler Winston	WR	Athlon 3rd, Phil Steele 3rd	
2015	Michael Carrizosa	P	FWAA 2nd, WCFF 2nd	
2015	Tyler Ervin	RB	Athlon 2nd	
2020	Cade Hall	DL	USA Today 2nd	
2022	Viliami Fehoko	DL	PFF 2nd	
2023	Kairee Robinson	HB	Hero Sports 2nd	
2024	Soane Toia	DL	Hero Sports 2nd	
2024	Justin Lockhart	WR	Hero Sports 3rd	
2024	Jordan Pollard Jr.	LB	Hero Sports 3rd	
2024	Nick Nash	WR	AFCA 1st, AP 1st, FWAA 1st, WCFF 1st, TSN 1st, CBS 1st, PFF	

== Pro Football Hall of Fame ==
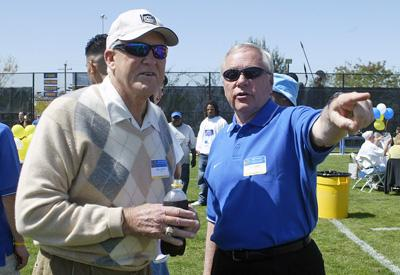
SJSU Alumnus Bill Walsh and former Spartans Head Football Coach Dick Tomey

Two former SJSU players have been inducted into the Pro Football Hall of Fame. Bill Walsh attended San Jose State, where he played quarterback from 1953 to 1955. He went on to win three Super Bowls as the head coach of the San Francisco 49ers.

Dick Vermeil played for San Jose State as a backup quarterback before graduating in 1959 with a master's degree. Vermeil later won Super Bowl XXXIV in 1999 as the head coach of the St. Louis Rams.

Name	Years	Position	Inducted	Ref
Bill Walsh	1953–1955	Head coach	1993	
Dick Vermeil	1956–1959	Head coach	2022	

== College Football Hall of Fame ==
Two former SJSU players have been inducted into the College Football Hall of Fame. Willie Heston attended San Jose State, where he played halfback from 1898 to 1900 before transferring to the University of Michigan. Heston has been named one of the greatest halfbacks in college football history.

Terry Donahue was a freshman walk-on defensive tackle for one year at San Jose State before transferring to UCLA. Donahue was inducted into the College Football Hall of Fame for his contributions as the head coach at UCLA.

Two former San Jose State coaches are also enshrined in the College Football Hall of Fame, mostly for their contributions while coaching at other schools. Pop Warner led his teams to a combined four national championships while serving as the head coach at Pitt and Stanford.

John Ralston led Stanford to multiple Rose Bowl victories before taking over as the head coach at SJSU from 1993 to 1996. Ralston was inducted into the College Football Hall of Fame as a coach in 1992.

Name	Years	Position	Inducted	Ref
Glenn "Pop" Warner	1939–1940	Associate Coach	1951	
Willie Heston	1898–1900	HB	1954	
John Ralston	1993–1996	Head coach	1992	
Terry Donahue	1963	DT / Head coach	2000	

== San Jose State players in the NFL ==
As of December 2022, 139 San Jose State players have gone on to play in the NFL, and seven former Spartans are actively playing in the NFL as of August 2023. The 139 players include 121 draftees, six NFL Pro Bowl selections, six first-round draft picks, two MVP award winners, and one NFL Rookie of the Year.

Along with Miami (OH), Dayton, Arkansas, Eastern Illinois, and Pacific, SJSU is one of only six programs in the nation to produce more than one alumnus who would go on to coach Super Bowl-winning teams.

=== Current athletes in the NFL ===
As of February 2026, there are five former SJSU players in the NFL.

Player	Team	Position	Round	Year
Josh Oliver	Minnesota Vikings	TE	3	2019
David Quessenberry	Los Angeles Rams	G	6	2013
Viliami Fehoko	Indianapolis Colts	DE	4	2023
Elijah Cooks	New Orleans Saints	WR	UDFA	2023
Nick Nash	Washington Commanders	WR	UDFA	2025

== All-time record vs. current Mountain West teams ==
Record at the start of the 2026 NCAA Division I FBS football season.

Opponent	Won	Lost	Tied	Percentage	Streak	First meeting
Air Force	3	6	0	.333	Lost 1	1996
Hawaii	24	22	1	.521	Won 5	1936
Northern Illinois	0	1	0	.000	Lost 1	1995
North Dakota State	0	0	0	–	–	2026
Nevada	12	24	2	.342	Lost 1	1899
New Mexico	16	5	1	.750	Won 4	1954
UNLV	22	7	1	.750	Lost 1	1981
UTEP	5	5	0	.500	Lost 1	1966
Wyoming	7	8	0	.467	Lost 1	1959
Totals	89	78	5	.532	–	–

== Future non-conference opponents ==
Announced schedules as of September 30, 2026.

2026	2027	2028	2029	2030	2031	2032	2033	2034	2035	2036
at USC	Sacred Heart	Mercyhurst	Eastern Michigan	Oregon State	Chattanooga	Howard	Robert Morris	at Stanford	Stanford	at Stanford
at Eastern Michigan	at Minnesota	at California	at Oregon State	Sacramento State	Washington State	Sacramento State	at Washington	Fresno State	at Fresno State	at Sacramento State
Cal Poly	at Sacramento State	Toledo	Utah Tech	Cal Poly	California	at North Texas	at Fresno State	at Sacramento State	Sacramento State	
Fresno State	North Texas	at Stanford	at Fresno State		Stanford	Fresno State				
North Dakota State (Note: Even though NDSU and SJSU are MW opponents, they will play as non-conference opponents in 2026.)										
