= Ethan Vasko =

American football player

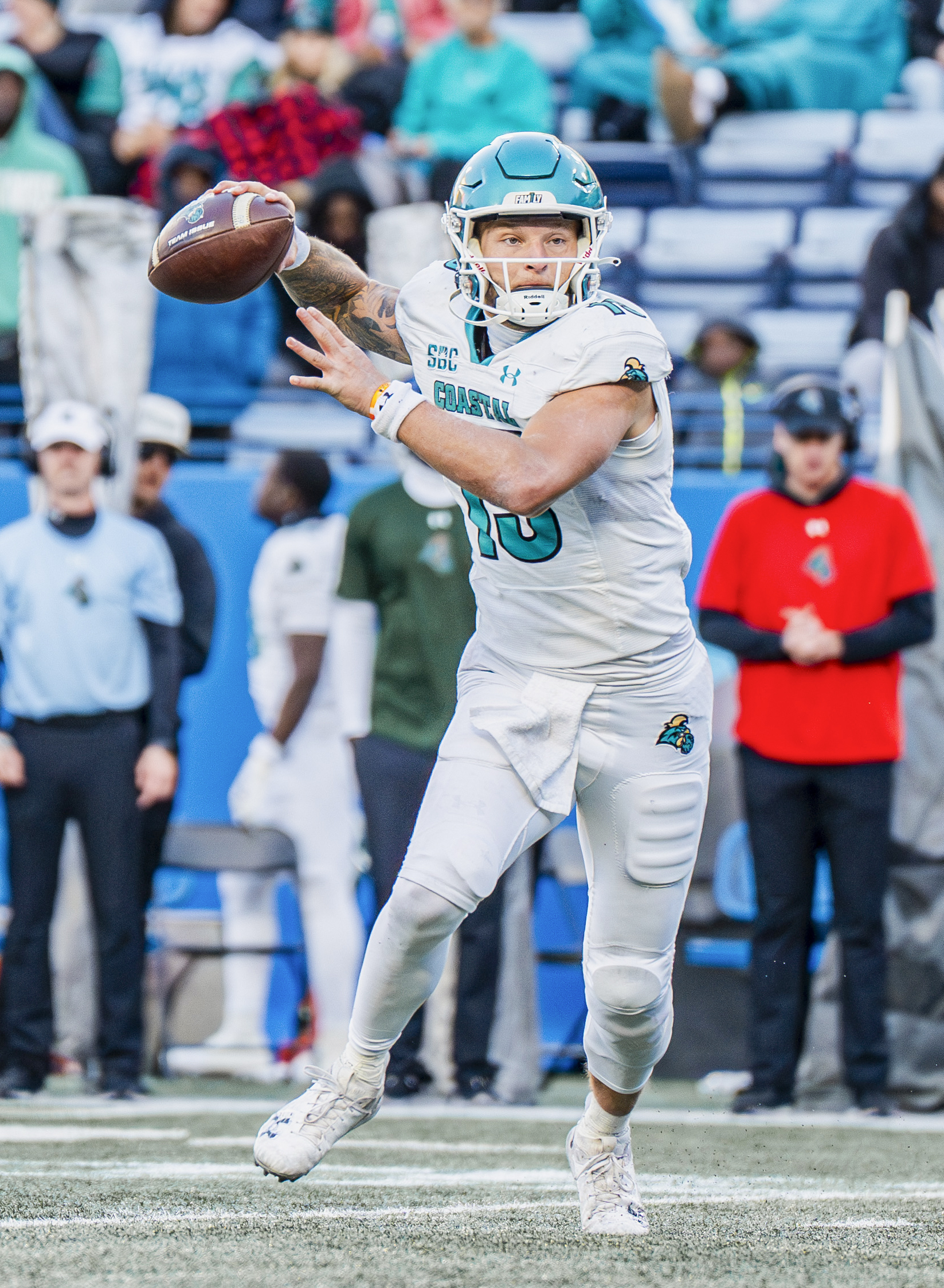

No. 15 – Liberty Flames
- Position: Quarterback
- Class: (redshirt) Senior

Personal information
- Listed height: 6 ft 3 in (1.91 m)
- Listed weight: 220 lb (100 kg)

Career information
- High school: Oscar F. Smith (Chesapeake, Virginia)
- College: Kansas (2022); Coastal Carolina (2023–2024); Liberty (2025–present)
- Stats at ESPN

Ethan Vasko is an American college football quarterback who plays for the Liberty Flames. He previously played for the Kansas Jayhawks and the Coastal Carolina Chanticleers.

== Early life ==
Ethan grew up in Currituck, North Carolina. He played football for the rec team Currituck Storm. In middle school he played for the Moyock Middle School Bulldogs. He also attended Currituck County High School for his freshman year before transferring. Vasko attended Oscar F. Smith High School in Chesapeake, Virginia. In his high school career, he totaled 9,203 total yards and 134 total touchdowns. A three-star recruit, Vasko, originally committed to Old Dominion, flipped his commitment to play college football at the University of Kansas.

== College career ==
Vasko redshirted during the 2022 season, making his collegiate debut against Texas Tech, throwing for 13 yards in his only appearance. At the end of the season, Vasko entered the transfer portal.

On April 24, 2023, Vasko announced he decision to transfer to Coastal Carolina University to play for the Coastal Carolina Chanticleers. He entered the 2023 season as the backup to Grayson McCall. After an injury to McCall, Vasko started for the Chanticleers against Old Dominion, throwing for 180 yards and a touchdown, while rushing for 170 yards and a touchdown, leading Coastal Carolina to a 28–24 victory. In the 2023 Hawaii Bowl, he threw for 199 yards and three touchdowns, being named the game's MVP. Entering the 2024 season, Vasko competed for Coastal Carolina's starting quarterback job. Prior to the season opener against Jacksonville State, he was named the Chanticleers starting quarterback. In the season opener, he totaled 288 yards and three touchdowns, being named the Sun Belt Conference offensive player of the week for his performance. Against Old Dominion, Vasko threw for 367 yards and three touchdowns in a 45–37 victory. Against Georgia State, he totaled four touchdowns, three passing and one rushing, to help the Chanticleers achieve bowl eligibility in a 48–27 win.

On December 5, 2024, Vasko announced that he would enter the transfer portal.

=== Statistics ===
Season	Team	Games			Passing								Rushing			
Season	Team	GP	GS	Record	Comp	Att	Pct	Yards	Avg	TD	Int	Rate	Att	Yards	Avg	TD
2022	Kansas	1	0	0–0	3	5	60.0	13	2.6	0	0	81.8	2	6	3.0	0
2023	Coastal Carolina	8	4	3–1	76	122	62.3	779	6.4	7	1	133.2	63	368	5.8	2
2024	Coastal Carolina	12	12	6–6	148	271	54.6	2,110	7.8	14	8	131.2	107	447	4.2	5
2025	Liberty	10	10	4–6	151	266	56.8	1,961	7.4	10	12	122.1	100	258	2.6	5
2026	Liberty	1	0	0–0	1	1	100.0	6	6.0	1	0	480.4	3	14	4.7	2
Career		32	26	13−13	379	665	57.0	4,879	7.3	32	21	128.2	275	1,093	4.0	14
