= Nick Nash =

American football player (born 1999)

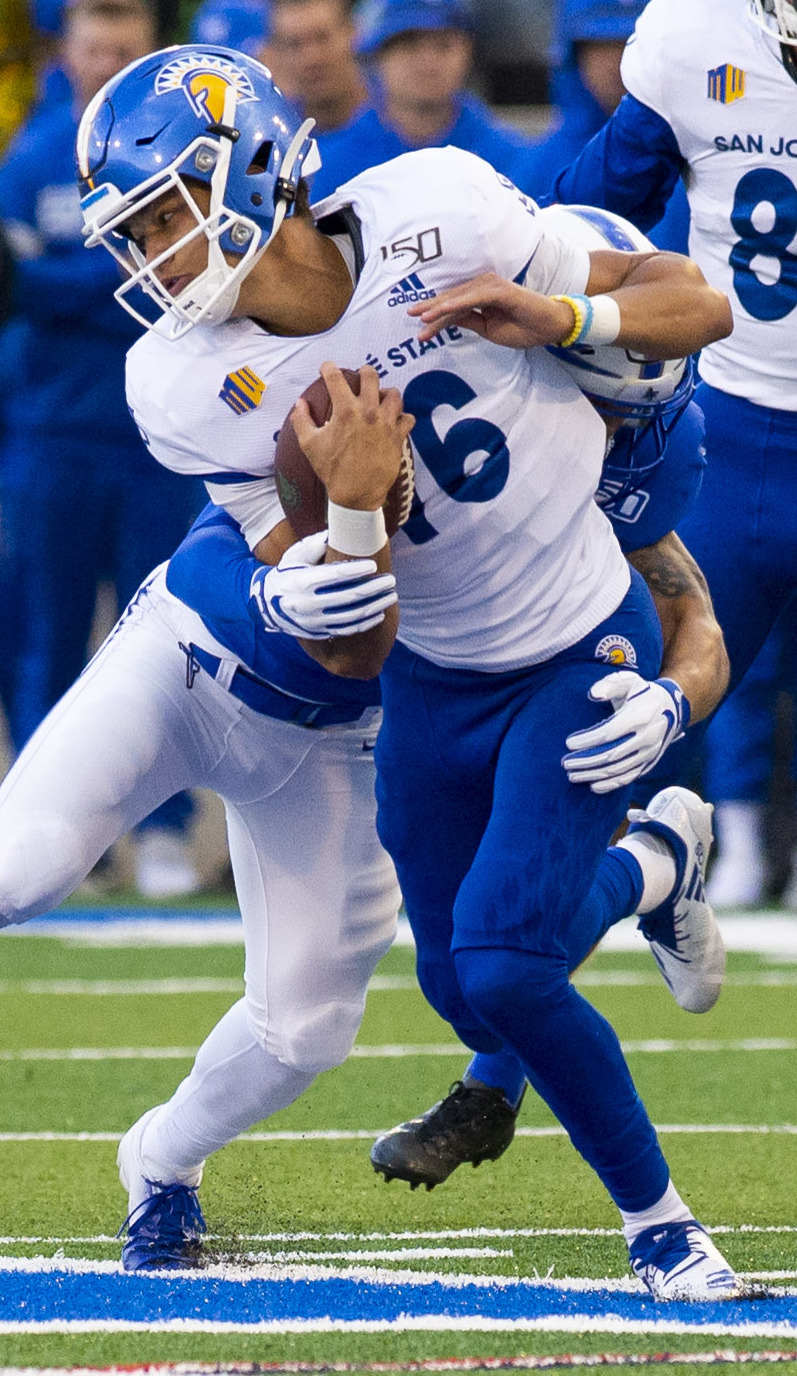
- Nash with the San Jose State Spartans in 2019

Orlando Storm
- Position: Wide receiver
- Roster status: Unsigned draft pick

Personal information
- Born: July 8, 1999 (age 27); Anaheim, California, U.S.
- Listed height: 6 ft 3 in (1.91 m)
- Listed weight: 195 lb (88 kg)

Career information
- High school: Woodbridge (Irvine, California)
- College: San Jose State (2019–2024)
- NFL draft: 2025: undrafted

Career history
- Atlanta Falcons (2025)*; Washington Commanders (2026)*; Orlando Storm (2027-present)
- * Offseason or practice squad member only

Awards and highlights
- Unanimous All-American (2024); NCAA receiving touchdowns leader (2024); First-team All-Mountain West (2024); Second-team All-Mountain West (2023)
- Stats at Pro Football Reference

Kenneth Nicholas Nash (born July 8, 1999) is an American professional football wide receiver for the Orlando Storm. Nash played college football for the San Jose State Spartans. He signed with the Atlanta Falcons as an undrafted free agent in 2025.

== Early life ==
Born in Anaheim, California, Nash attended and played football and baseball at Woodbridge High School in Irvine, California. In 2017, he was named Pacific Coast League Offensive Most Valuable Player. Nash passed for 1,728 yards and 18 touchdowns with six interceptions. He also showed versatility on the ground, rushing for 1,269 yards and 17 touchdowns.

== College career ==
On February 7, 2018, Nash committed to San Jose State. He was used as a dual-threat quarterback his freshman year, primarily entering the game as a rushing quarterback. He recorded his first collegiate touchdown on a 20-yard rush against Tulsa. He threw his first two career touchdown passes against Air Force.

In 2020, Nash threw for a career high 169 yards and two touchdowns off the bench replacing an injured Nick Starkel in a come from behind victory against San Diego State. Nash and the Spartans captured the 2020 MWC Championship.

In 2021, Nash started six games at quarterback when Starkel went down with an injury. He threw for a career-high three touchdowns on 15-18 passing for 193 yards in a victory against New Mexico State. On the season, Nash threw for 971 yards and six touchdowns to three interceptions.

In 2022, Nash struggled to find playing time at the quarterback position with transfer Chevan Cordeiro being named the starter. He appeared in five games and caught his first career touchdown reception in the 2022 Famous Idaho Potato Bowl.

In 2023, he made the full transition to wide receiver where he played and started in all 13 games. In week 1, Nash caught six passes for 89 yards and three touchdowns against USC. He made a diving touchdown catch where he tipped the ball to himself mid-air. The play debuted #2 on the SportsCenter on August 26. He ended the season leading the Spartans with a team high 48 receptions for 728 yards and eight touchdowns. In January, Nash briefly entered the transfer portal, but ultimately decided to rejoin San Jose State. Nash completed his bachelor's degree in communication studies in May 2024.

In week one of the 2024 season, Nash caught a then career high 10 catches for 170 yards and two touchdowns. He also threw his first touchdown pass since the 2021 season in a victory against Sacramento State. On the game, he surpassed 1,000 career receiving yards. Nash had a breakout game with a school record 17 receptions and a career high 225 receiving yards in week three. He also caught three touchdowns in the 31–10 victory over Kennesaw State. The following week against Washington State, Nash had 16 receptions for 152 yards and two touchdowns in a double overtime loss. Nash hauled in a touchdown the first ten games of the season, and eleven of twelve games he played. He had multiple touchdowns in four games on the season. In his final collegiate game against rival Stanford, Nash caught eight passes for 91 yards and two touchdowns. His two touchdowns broke the single season touchdown record at San Jose State. The Spartans also defeated Stanford for the first time since 2006. San Jose State finished the season 7–5, (3–4) in conference play, and was selected to the 2024 Hawaii Bowl, on December 18, 2024. Nash would later go on to opt out of the Hawaii bowl to preserve his health for the 2025 NFL draft. Nash won the NCAA receiving triple crown in the regular season, racking up 104 receptions, 1,382 receiving yards, and 16 receiving touchdowns. Nash earned Unanimous All-American, and First-Team All-Mountain-West honors for his one of a kind season. Nash controversially lost the 2024 Fred Biletnikoff Award to Colorado's Travis Hunter despite being the NCAA receiving triple crown winner.

=== Statistics ===
Season	Team	Games			Passing								Rushing				Receiving			
Season	Team	GP	GS	Record (Note: Accounts for only GS as a QB)	Cmp	Att	Pct	Yds	Y/A	TD	Int	Rtg	Att	Yds	Avg	TD	Rec	Yds	Avg	TD
2019	San Jose State	6	0	—	12	17	70.6	133	7.8	2	0	175.1	40	255	6.4	3	1	4	4.0	0
2020	San Jose State	8	1	—	20	34	58.8	213	6.3	2	2	119.1	40	204	5.1	1	0	0	0.0	0
2021	San Jose State	11	6	3–3	74	138	53.6	971	7.0	6	3	122.7	68	385	5.7	1	4	36	9.0	0
2022	San Jose State	5	0	—	0	0	0.0	0	0.0	0	0	0.0	3	23	7.7	0	6	62	10.3	1
2023	San Jose State	13	13	—	0	1	0.0	0	0.0	0	0	0.0	1	0	0.0	0	48	728	14.9	8
2024	San Jose State	12	12	—	2	2	100.0	42	21.0	2	0	606.4	1	-9	-9.0	0	104	1,382	13.3	16
Career		55	32	3–3	108	192	56.3	1,359	7.1	12	5	131.1	153	858	5.6	5	163	2,212	13.6	25

== Professional career ==
Pre-draft measurables
Height	Weight	Arm length	Hand span	Wingspan	40-yard dash	10-yard split	20-yard split	20-yard shuttle	Three-cone drill	Vertical jump	Broad jump
6 ft 2 1/2 in (1.89 m)	203 lb (92 kg)	31 in (0.79 m)	8 3/4 in (0.22 m)	6 ft 4 1/2 in (1.94 m)	4.57 s	1.54 s	2.68 s	4.31 s	7.08 s	34.0 in (0.86 m)	10 ft 3 in (3.12 m)
All values from NFL Combine/Pro Day

=== Atlanta Falcons ===
After going unselected in the 2025 NFL draft, Nash signed with the Atlanta Falcons as an undrafted free agent on April 28, 2025. During the 2025 preseason, Nash caught 12 passes for 136 receiving yards. He was waived on August 26 as part of final roster cuts and re-signed to the practice squad the next day.

=== Washington Commanders ===
On January 6, 2026, Nash signed a reserve/future contract with the Washington Commanders. On August 30, he was waived by the Commanders as a part of final roster cuts before the start of the regular season.

=== Orlando Storm ===
On November 19, 2026, Nash was drafted in the 15th round of the 2027 UFL Draft by the Orlando Storm
