= Quali Conley =

American football player (born 2002)

No. 24 – Saskatchewan Roughriders
- Position: Running back
- Roster status: Active
- CFL status: American

Personal information
- Born: September 25, 2002 (age 24); Fresno, California, U.S.
- Listed height: 5 ft 10 in (1.78 m)
- Listed weight: 211 lb (96 kg)

Career information
- High school: Central (Fresno)
- College: Utah Tech (2020–2022); San Jose State (2023); Arizona (2024)
- NFL draft: 2025: undrafted

Career history
- Cincinnati Bengals (2025)*; Montreal Alouettes (2026)*; Saskatchewan Roughriders (2026–present)
- * Offseason or practice squad member only

Awards and highlights
- First-team All-WAC (2022)
- Stats at CFL.ca

Quali Conley (born September 25, 2002) is an American professional football running back for the Saskatchewan Roughriders of the Canadian Football League (CFL). He played college football for the Utah Tech Trailblazers, San Jose State Spartans and Arizona Wildcats.

== College career ==
Conley played college football for the Utah Tech Trailblazers from 2020 to 2022, San Jose State Spartans in 2023 and Arizona Wildcats in 2024. At Utah Tech, he played in 27 games, rushing for 1,758 yards and 13 touchdowns, topping 1,000 yards in his final season for the Trailblazers. In addition, Conley caught 50 passes for 447 yards and three touchdowns. For his efforts, he earned first-team All-Western Athletic Conference honors.

Conley transferred to San Jose State for his junior season. He served as backup to Kairee Robinson but managed to record 842 rushing yards, nine touchdowns and 27 receptions for 269 yards. After the season was finished Conley entered the transfer portal once again.

On February 7, 2024, Conley committed to University of Arizona, following head coach Brent Brennan to the team. He played in 12 games and led the team in rushing yards and touchdowns with 745 and eight, respectively. Conley also registered 39 catches for 245 yards and one touchdown.

== Professional career ==
Pre-draft measurables
Height	Weight	Arm length	Hand span	Wingspan	40-yard dash	10-yard split	20-yard split	20-yard shuttle	Three-cone drill	Vertical jump	Broad jump	Bench press
5 ft 10 in (1.78 m)	211 lb (96 kg)	29 1/8 in (0.74 m)	9 in (0.23 m)	6 ft 1/4 in (1.84 m)	4.63 s	1.64 s	2.69 s	4.56 s	7.52 s	34.5 in (0.88 m)	9 ft 5 in (2.87 m)	24 reps
All values from Pro Day

=== Cincinnati Bengals ===
After not being selected in the 2025 NFL draft, Conley signed with the Cincinnati Bengals as an undrafted free agent. He was released by the Bengals on August 25, 2025.

=== Montreal Alouettes ===
On January 2, 2026, the Montreal Alouettes of the Canadian Football League (CFL) signed Conley. He was waived by the team May 14.

=== Saskatchewan Roughriders ===
On May 16, 2026, the Saskatchewan Roughriders signed Conley. He was signed to practice roster on May 31. Following an injury to starter A. J. Ouellette, Conley was elevated to the active roster on June 25 and made his first start the following day against the Toronto Argonauts.
