= Tim Beck (American football, born 1966) =

American football player and coach (born 1966)

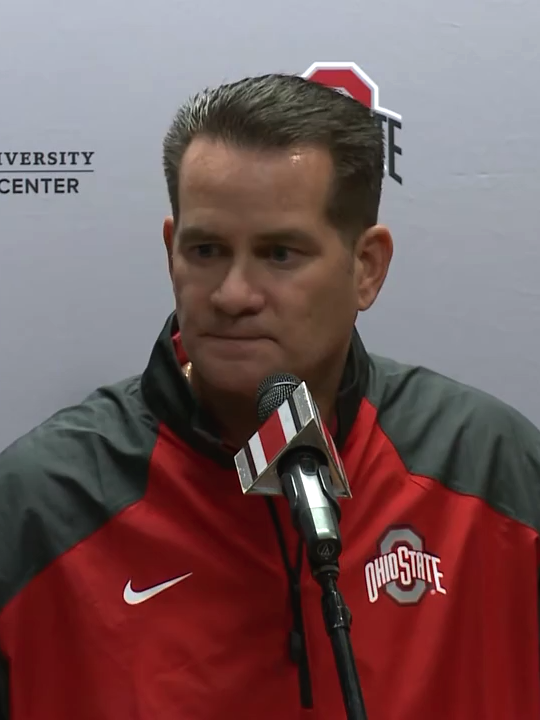
- Beck in 2015

Biographical details
- Born: March 14, 1966 (age 60); Youngstown, Ohio, U.S.
- Education: UCF (B.A.); Kansas State (M.A.)

Playing career
- 1985: UCF
- Position: Quarterback

Coaching career (HC unless noted)
- 1988–1989: Miramar HS (FL) (assistant)
- 1990: Illinois State (LB/P)
- 1991–1992: Kansas State (GA)
- 1993–1995: Saguaro HS (AZ)
- 1996–1997: Missouri State (QB/WR)
- 1998: Missouri State (OC)
- 1999–2001: R. L. Turner HS (TX)
- 2002–2004: Mansfield Summit HS (TX)
- 2005–2006: Kansas (WR)
- 2007: Kansas (WR/PGC)
- 2008–2010: Nebraska (RB)
- 2011–2014: Nebraska (OC/QB)
- 2015–2016: Ohio State (co-OC/QB)
- 2017–2019: Texas (OC/QB)
- 2019: Texas (QB)
- 2020–2022: NC State (OC/QB)
- 2023–2025: Coastal Carolina
- 2026: South Florida (OC)

Head coaching record
- Overall: 20–18 (college)
- Bowls: 1–1

Tim Beck (born March 14, 1966) is an American football coach and former player who most recently served as the offensive coordinator for South Florida. Beck previously served as the head football coach at Coastal Carolina University.

== Biography ==
=== Early life ===
Beck was born in Youngstown, Ohio on March 14, 1966, and graduated from Cardinal Mooney High School. Beck overlapped at Cardinal Mooney with future coaches Bo and Carl Pelini. Fellow football coaches Bob, Mark, and Mike Stoops also graduated from Cardinal Mooney.

== Playing career ==
Beck played one year of football at UCF (1985) and graduated from there in 1988 with a degree in liberal studies.

== Coaching career ==
Beck began his football coaching career as an assistant coach in 1988 at Miramar High School in Miramar, Florida. After two seasons, Beck advanced to the college coaching ranks by taking a position as outside linebackers coach and punters coach for the Illinois State Redbirds. Just one year later, Beck moved to his first position at a Big 12 Conference school when he was brought into the Kansas State program as a graduate assistant by Wildcats head coach Bill Snyder. Following his two years at Kansas State, Beck assumed his first head coaching position in a return to the high school ranks, when he was appointed to lead the Sabercats of Saguaro High School in Scottsdale, Arizona. The Sabercats had struggled for some time prior to his arrival, its record only 5–43 in the previous five years. In his third year at Saguaro, Beck led the Sabercats football team to the 1995 Arizona divisional state championship title, the first ever in the school's entire 30-year history, while assembling a 20–15 record during his tenure.

With his first head coaching title realized, Beck returned to the college coaching ranks in 1996 by accepting an assistant coaching position at Missouri State, and was promoted to offensive coordinator for the 1998 season. In his one year as MSU's offensive coordinator, the Bears amassed 4,542 all-purpose offensive yards, the fourth-highest mark in the university's 91-year history.

Beck was called back to the high school ranks in 1999 when he was hired to lead the R. L. Turner High School Lions in Carrollton, Texas, where he led the school to its first consecutive winning seasons and playoff appearances in 25 years, being named the district's coach of the year in 2000. Beck was then appointed to the top position at Mansfield Summit High School in Mansfield, Texas in 2002, where he was named their district coach of the year in his second season. Improving on the 2003 recognition, Beck led the Jaguars to the 2004 Texas state playoff quarterfinals and a 9–4 record, finishing the season with the highest-rated defense in the Dallas-Fort Worth metro area.

=== Kansas ===
In 2005, Beck returned to the college football coaching arena, accepting the position of wide receivers coach at the University of Kansas. The Jayhawks had been struggling for consistency, posting no conference wins in 2002, losing the bowl game in their 6–7 campaign of 2003, and missing bowl eligibility in the 4–7 season of 2004. Beck's receivers helped the 2005 Kansas team to a 7–5 record and their first bowl win since 1995. In 2006, four different Jayhawks receivers caught 24 or more passes, though the 6–6 team was not extended a bowl invitation. In 2007 Beck was also appointed as the Passing Game Coordinator at Kansas, and the season proved to be a breakthrough year for the Jayhawks. Kansas finished 12–1 with the second-best scoring offense nationally, shared the Big 12 Conference North division title with Missouri, and secured a final #7 ranking in both the AP and Coaches polls with their 24–21 win over #5 Virginia Tech in the 2008 Orange Bowl.

=== Nebraska ===
When Bo Pelini was named as Nebraska's 32nd head football coach for the program's turnaround 2008 season, Beck accepted the position of running backs coach for the Cornhuskers. In his first season, the Cornhuskers averaged 169.8 running yards per game, with three of the team's running backs amassing over 450 yards on the year and placing Nebraska as the leading ground yardage team of the conference's north division. 2009 saw the average fall slightly to 147.1 running yards per game, but thanks in part to Nebraska's effective defensive game this was still enough to outgain all but three of the season's opponents on the ground. Running back Roy Helu, Jr. recorded 1,147 yards on the year, while two Cornhusker true freshman backs secured a pair of touchdowns each for the first time since 1993.

Nebraska's 2010 ground offense was revitalized further by the emergence of redshirt freshman quarterback Taylor Martinez, who almost became just the third freshman quarterback in NCAA history to record over 1,000 yards on the ground, rushing for 965 yards. The 451 yards accumulated against Kansas State was Nebraska's highest total in 109 games.

Following Nebraska's offensive performance issues in 2010, Pelini replaced offensive coordinator Shawn Watson by promoting Beck to the top offensive spot. Beck also assumed responsibility for coaching the quarterbacks.

=== Ohio State ===
Beck became co-offensive coordinator for the Ohio State Buckeyes following the 2015 College Football Playoff National Championship, when Tom Herman left to become the head football coach for the Houston Cougars.

=== Texas ===
On January 3, 2017, it was announced that Beck would be leaving Ohio State to take over as the offensive coordinator and quarterbacks coach for Texas and new head coach Tom Herman.

On December 1, 2019, after a disappointing 7–5 regular season, Herman announced that Beck would be demoted from offensive coordinator, but would remain with the team as the quarterbacks coach for their bowl game.

=== NC State ===
On January 1, 2020, it was announced that Beck would become the offensive coordinator and quarterbacks coach for North Carolina State.

=== Coastal Carolina ===
On December 4, 2022, it was announced that Beck would become the new head coach at Coastal Carolina University. After leading the team to an 8–5 record in his first year, Beck had back-to-back 6–6 regular season finishes and was fired on November 30, 2025.

=== South Florida ===
On December 16, 2025, it was announced Beck would become the offensive coordinator of the South Florida Bulls.

== Head coaching record ==
=== College ===
Year	Team	Overall	Conference	Standing	Bowl/playoffs
Coastal Carolina Chanticleers (Sun Belt Conference) (2023–2025)
2023	Coastal Carolina	8–5	5–3	T–3rd (East)	W Hawaii
2024	Coastal Carolina	6–7	3–5	T–5th (East)	L Myrtle Beach
2025	Coastal Carolina	6–6	5–3	3rd (East)	Independence (Note: Coastal Carolina fired Beck before the bowl game.)
Coastal Carolina:		20–18	13–11		
Total:		20–18			
