= Chevan Cordeiro =

American football player (born 1999)

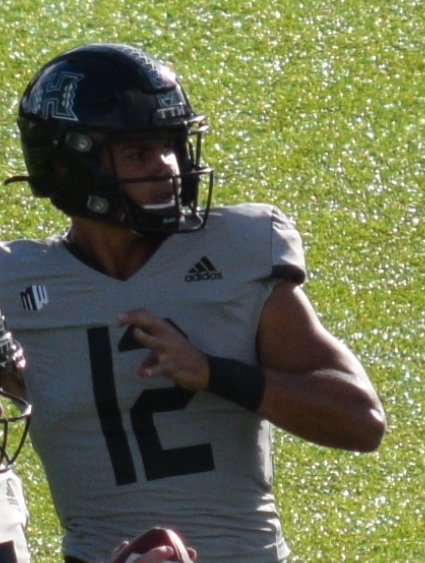
- Cordeiro with Hawaii in 2021

No. 1 – Fujifilm Ebina Minerva AFC
- Position: Quarterback
- Roster status: Active

Personal information
- Born: October 1, 1999 (age 27); Honolulu, Hawaii, U.S.
- Listed height: 6 ft 1 in (1.85 m)
- Listed weight: 200 lb (91 kg)

Career information
- High school: Saint Louis School (Honolulu)
- College: Hawaii (2018–2021); San Jose State (2022–2023)
- NFL draft: 2024: undrafted

Career history
- Seattle Seahawks (2024)*; St. Louis Battlehawks (2025); Fujifilm Ebina Minerva AFC (2025–present)
- * Offseason or practice squad member only

Awards and highlights
- First-team All-Mountain West (2023); Second-team All-Mountain West (2022)

Chevan Cordeiro (born October 1, 1999) is an American professional football quarterback for Fujifilm Ebina Minerva AFC of the X-League. He played college football for the Hawaii Rainbow Warriors and San Jose State Spartans.

== Early life ==
Cordeiro attended Saint Louis School in Honolulu. He was the backup to Tua Tagovailoa, and wasn't named the starting quarterback until his senior year as a result. In his lone season as the starter, Cordeiro accumulated over 3,000 total yards and 39 touchdowns en route to a perfect 10–0 record and an Open Division state title. He was also named the state's Gatorade Hawaii Football Player of the Year as well as the Star-Advertiser's Offensive Player of the Year.

Cordeiro's recruiting process was tame compared to his predecessor Tagovailoa, as he committed to playing college football for the Hawaii Rainbow Warriors, the only offer he received.

== College career ==
=== Hawaii ===
==== 2018 ====
Cordeiro made his first career start in 2018 against Wyoming, replacing the injured Cole McDonald. He threw 19 of 29 passes for 148 yards, two touchdowns and an interception that was returned for a touchdown in a 17–13 win that saw Hawaii reclaim the Paniolo Trophy. He also appeared in games against Nevada, UNLV, and Louisiana Tech.

In his appearance versus UNLV, Cordeiro threw for three touchdowns on four completed passes to lead Hawaii to a 35–28 victory. Down 28–13 in the fourth quarter, Cordeiro came off the bench to replace a struggling McDonald and threw for 153 yards, three touchdowns on 4 of 5 passes. The win was Hawaii's seventh of the season, clinching a bid in the Hawaii Bowl.

Cordeiro also appeared in the team's bowl game against Louisiana Tech in an attempt to spark the Hawaii offense, failing to do so as Hawaii scored a season low 14 points in the 31–14 loss.

Under the newly changed NCAA redshirt policy, Cordeiro was able to play in four games and redshirt to keep an extra year of eligibility after the 2018 season.

==== 2019 ====
In his redshirt freshman season, Cordeiro appeared in 12 of Hawaii's 15 games. He made his 2019 debut in a nationally televised Week 0 game against Arizona, replacing McDonald who had four interceptions despite throwing for four touchdowns as well. Cordeiro threw for 58 yards and a touchdown, adding 34 rushing yards. He made his first start of the season against San Jose State, completing 23 of 31 passes for 309 yards and three touchdowns, also accounting for 55 rushing yards and two touchdowns in a 42–40 win. For his efforts in the win, Cordeiro was named the Mountain West offensive player of the week.

==== 2020 ====
With McDonald departing Hawaii to declare for the 2020 NFL draft, Cordeiro was considered the favorite to win the starting quarterback job for the Rainbow Warriors. He was officially named the starting quarterback for the team's first game against Fresno State on October 19. Cordeiro finished the season with a 5–4 record while completing 2,083 passing yards and 14 touchdowns, while also leading Hawaii in rushing yards (483) and touchdowns (7).

==== 2021 ====
Cordeiro entered 2021 as the starting quarterback once again, and was named a team captain by his peers. Cordeiro missed three games due to a shoulder injury, returning to the starting lineup against Utah State. He would go 2–3 on his last 5 games capping with a 38–14 win over Wyoming for the Paniolo Trophy.

On December 1, 2021, Cordeiro announced via social media that he would be transferring from Hawaii. On December 11, Cordeiro announced he would transfer to San Jose State.

=== San Jose State ===
"When I came from Hawaii to (San Jose State), I was in a bad place and mentally I didn't really like football. When I got here, the whole team took me in, a brother already the first day I got there, and I'm forever grateful. It doesn't really matter about the wins and losses. The love of the game, I found that again. And that's what I'll remember for the rest of my life."

— Cordeiro on transferring to San Jose State, following his final game in 2023

==== 2022 ====
Cordeiro was expected to earn the starting job but competed with then QB Nick Nash in the spring and preseason. He was officially named to the team's starting lineup.

On September 1, in a season opener against Portland State, Cordeiro completed 15 of 30 passes for 239 yards and one touchdown while running for two more on the ground as he rallies for a 21–17 victory; Cordeiro's first win as a Spartan. The team's first setback came against Auburn on September 10. In the 24–16 loss, Cordeiro passed for 275 yards on 60% of his passes to go along with 13 carries and 23 rushing yards. Throughout the season, Cordeiro would eventually lead the Spartans to a 7–4 record in his first year as starter capping with a 27–14 victory against his former team Hawaii and solidifying their bowl eligibility. On December 20, Cordeiro and the Spartans faced Eastern Michigan in the Famous Idaho Potato Bowl. Despite building an early 13–0 lead, the Spartans were unable to sustain momentum the rest of the way and lost to the Eagles 41–27.

==== 2023 ====
Prior to his final season, Cordeiro was named the Mountain West 2023 Preseason Offensive Player of the Year. In their first game of the season, the Spartans faced a USC team ranked #6 in the AP Poll and deemed 31-point favorites; Cordeiro passed for 198 yards and three touchdowns while rushing for 52 yards, though USC pulled away in the second half to win 56–28. San Jose State struggled in the following game against 18th-ranked Oregon State, and Cordeiro was replaced by backup Jay Butterfield during garbage time of the 42–17 loss.

He improved against Cal Poly with two touchdown passes while scoring a third via rushing as the Spartans won 59–3. However, it was their only win across the first six games; their next three games, all losses, saw Cordeiro throw just one touchdown against three interceptions while scoring two rushing touchdowns. In a 21–17 loss to Toledo, he surpassed 10,000 career passing yards but also had an interception that was returned for a touchdown.

Despite the 1–5 start, San Jose State rebounded by winning their remaining six games to finish 7–5. Cordeiro threw for three touchdowns with no interceptions twice against Utah State and Fresno State. During the winning streak, he recorded 13 touchdown passes and just one interception. One of the victories was a 35–0 win over Hawaii in his return to his home state, which Cordeiro admitted was "kind of tough" at the start as he "let the emotions get to me for a little. Took my three deep breaths and then I just played my game." He ended the win with two touchdowns.

Cordeiro's last game was the 2023 Hawaii Bowl, and he described getting to end his college career at home as "mean[ing] everything." He threw a touchdown in the game and set the Mountain West record for completions in a career when he recorded his 962nd during the third quarter, but the Spartans lost to Coastal Carolina 24–14.

=== Statistics ===
Year	Team	Games			Passing								Rushing			
Year	Team	GP	GS	Record	Comp	Att	Pct	Yards	Avg	TD	Int	Rate	Att	Yards	Avg	TD
2018	Hawaii	4	1	1–0	30	49	61.2	384	7.8	6	2	159.3	23	46	2.0	0
2019	Hawaii	12	1	1–0	69	120	57.5	907	7.6	8	3	138.0	40	212	5.3	3
2020	Hawaii	9	9	5–4	195	313	62.3	2,083	6.7	14	6	129.1	116	483	4.2	7
2021	Hawaii	11	10	6–4	195	353	55.2	2,793	7.9	17	11	131.4	116	342	2.9	3
2022	San Jose State	12	12	7–5	259	427	60.7	3,251	7.6	23	6	139.6	138	265	1.9	9
2023	San Jose State	13	13	7–6	223	362	61.6	2,773	7.1	20	4	142.0	81	272	3.4	3
Career		61	46	27−19	971	1,624	59.7	12,191	7.4	88	32	136.8	514	1,620	3.2	25

== Professional career ==
Pre-draft measurables
Height	Weight	Arm length	Hand span	40-yard dash	10-yard split	20-yard split	20-yard shuttle	Three-cone drill	Vertical jump	Broad jump
6 ft 0 5/8 in (1.84 m)	200 lb (91 kg)	30 1/4 in (0.77 m)	9 1/2 in (0.24 m)	4.63 s	1.60 s	2.67 s	4.28 s	7.00 s	31.5 in (0.80 m)	9 ft 11 in (3.02 m)
All values from Pro Day

=== Seattle Seahawks ===
On April 27, 2024, Cordeiro signed with the Seattle Seahawks as an undrafted free agent after he was not selected in the 2024 NFL draft. Cordeiro was released by the Seahawks on May 8.

=== St. Louis Battlehawks ===
On July 17, 2024, Cordeiro was selected in the first round (fifth overall) by the St. Louis Battlehawks in the 2024 UFL draft. He was signed on December 19. Cordeiro did not see any playing time with the team before suffering an injury and being placed on injured reserve. He was activated on May 19.

=== Fuji Xerox Minerva AFC ===
In 2025, Cordeiro began playing for Fujifilm Ebina Minerva AFC of Japan's X-League.
