= Brent Brennan =

American football player and coach (born 1973)

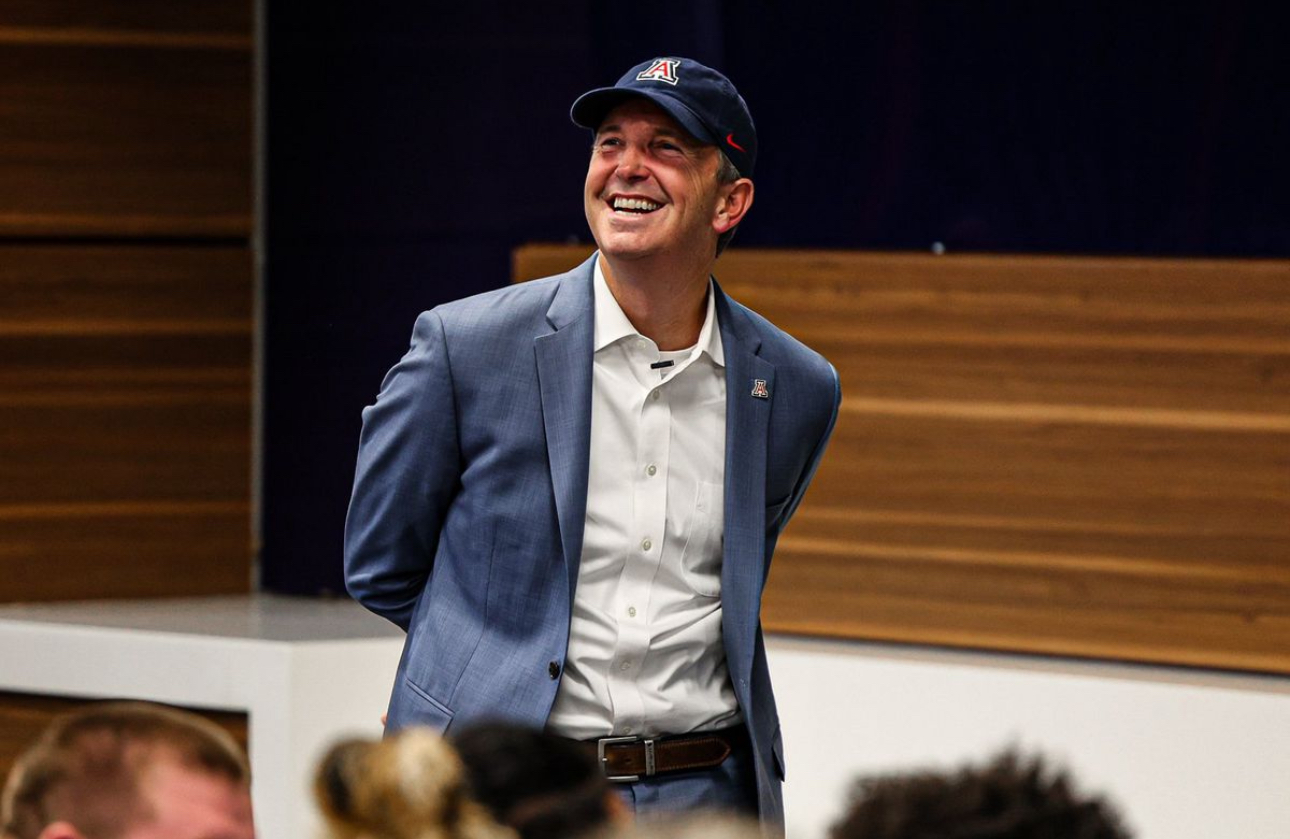
- Brennan in 2024

Current position
- Title: Head coach
- Team: Arizona
- Conference: Big 12
- Record: 21–15
- Annual salary: $4.7 million

Biographical details
- Born: March 20, 1973 (age 53); Redwood City, California, U.S.

Playing career
- 1993–1994: UCLA
- Position: Wide receiver

Coaching career (HC unless noted)
- 1996: Woodside (CA) (assistant)
- 1998: Hawaii (GA/WR)
- 1999: Washington (GA/TE)
- 2000: Arizona (GA)
- 2001–2004: Cal Poly (WR/RC)
- 2005–2006: San Jose State (WR/RC)
- 2007–2008: San Jose State (TE/RC)
- 2009: San Jose State (co-OC/OL/TE/ST)
- 2010: San Jose State (WR)
- 2011–2016: Oregon State (WR/OWR)
- 2017–2023: San Jose State
- 2024–present: Arizona

Head coaching record
- Overall: 55–63
- Bowls: 0–4

Accomplishments and honors

Championships
- MW (2020)

Awards
- MW Coach of the Year (2020); Lombardi Foundation Coach of the Year (2020)

Brent Munger Brennan (born March 20, 1973) is an American college football coach who is currently the head football coach at the University of Arizona. Brennan was the head football coach at San Jose State University from 2017 to 2023.

Prior to his head coaching positions, Brennan served as an assistant coach at Oregon State University, San Jose State University, California Polytechnic State University, San Luis Obispo, the University of Arizona, University of Washington and the University of Hawaiʻi at Mānoa.

== Early life and education ==
Brennan was born and raised in Redwood City, California, and attended Saint Francis High School in Mountain View, graduating in 1991. Brennan later went to UCLA. He lettered in football in 1993 (jersey number 14) and 1994 (jersey number 86) as a wide receiver and graduated in 1996.

== Coaching career ==
=== Assistant coaching ===
Brennan began his coaching career at Woodside High School in Woodside, California, as an assistant in 1996. After two seasons at Woodside, Brennan enrolled in graduate school at the University of Hawaii at Manoa and served as a graduate assistant on the Hawaii Rainbow Warriors football team in 1998. Brennan also had stints as a graduate assistant at Washington under Rick Neuheisel in 1999 and Arizona in 2000 under Dick Tomey.

From 2001 to 2004, Brennan was wide receivers coach at Cal Poly under Rich Ellerson. Brennan also became recruiting coordinator in 2004. Cal Poly moved from independence to the Great West Football Conference in 2004 and won the conference championship in its inaugural season there.

Reuniting with Tomey, Brennan became an assistant coach at San Jose State in 2005 and would coach in various capacities for six seasons, encompassing Tomey's entire tenure and Mike MacIntyre's first season. Also a recruiting coordinator, Brennan coached wide receivers in 2005 and 2006, during which he coached future NFL draft picks James Jones and John Broussard and helped San Jose State win its first bowl since 1990 in the 2006 New Mexico Bowl. Brennan coached tight ends while still being recruiting coordinator in the 2007 and 2008 seasons. In 2009, Brennan became co-offensive coordinator and special teams coordinator, while coaching offensive tackles and tight ends as well. When MacIntyre became head coach in 2010, Brennan only coached wide receivers.

From 2011 to 2016, Brennan coached wide receivers at Oregon State, more specifically outside receivers in his final season. Among the players that Brennan coached at Oregon State were the school's all-time leading receiver James Rodgers, and All-American receivers Brandin Cooks and Markus Wheaton; Cooks also won the Fred Biletnikoff Award in 2013.

=== San Jose State ===
Brennan was hired as San Jose State's head coach on December 7, 2016. His first two seasons ended with a combined 3–22 record, including a 1–11 season in 2018 that tied the 2010 team for the fewest in program history. Despite the poor record, five of the 2018 team's losses were by fewer than nine points, with three being determined by a field goal.

In 2019, the Spartans began 2–1, and a victory over Arkansas marked the team's first win against a Southeastern Conference opponent. San Jose State also defeated Army, becoming the 20th program all time to beat all three FBS United States service academies (Army, Air Force, and Navy), and rival Fresno State in a comeback. The Spartans finished 5–7, falling one win short of bowl eligibility. Brennan received a three-year contract extension at the end of the season.

The 2020 Spartans went 6–0 in the regular season despite having two games canceled and their final two home games relocated due to the COVID-19 pandemic; the pandemic had also forced the team to conduct preseason practices at Humboldt State University due to Santa Clara County restrictions. San Jose State's undefeated record qualified them for the Mountain West Conference Football Championship Game, where they defeated Boise State for the first time 34–20; it was the Spartans' first undisputed conference championship since 1990 and their first 7–0 record since 1939. Brennan was named the Mountain West Coach of the Year and Lombardi Foundation Coach of the Year for his team's successes, which included being ranked in the AP Poll for the first time since 2012 and a debut appearance in the College Football Playoff rankings, and also finished fifth in the Associated Press College Football Coach of the Year Award voting with three first-place votes. He signed a contract extension on December 23.

San Jose State regressed to 5–7 during an injury-marred 2021 season. Over the next two years, the team recorded back-to-back bowl appearances for the first time since 1986 and 1987, including rebounding from a 1–5 start to 2023. The 2023 regular season saw the Spartans defeat 25th-ranked Fresno State for their first win over a ranked opponent since 2013, before missing the Mountain West Championship Game via tiebreaker.

Brennan finished his career at San Jose State with an overall record of 34–48, with three bowl appearances and one conference title game appearance. He was the first head coach in program history to qualify for three bowl games.

=== Arizona ===
On January 16, 2024, Brennan was hired as the head coach at Arizona, signing a five-year contract worth $17.5 million.

Brennan entered his first season with expectations of competing for the Big 12 championship, as the Wildcats were ranked 21st in the AP preseason poll. He led Arizona to victories in three of their first four games, but the Wildcats faltered down the stretch, losing seven of their final eight games, capped off with a 49–7 defeat to their rival Arizona State. The Wildcats finished 4–8 in their first season under Brennan, six wins fewer than last season. Brennan recalled in 2026 that the 2024 team had a "terrible foundation" due to players, who were recruited by previous coach Jedd Fisch, leaving despite him "just kissing everybody’s ass, begging them to stay".

The poor 2024 campaign sparked speculation that Brennan was on the hot seat going into 2025; USA Today described the program as having a "pervasive sense of doom and gloom", while ESPN's Pete Thamel reported the $10.6 million buyout clause was "something Arizona is expected to consider if there's no improvement". Brennan overhauled the coaching staff over the offseason and convinced quarterback Noah Fifita to stay. Fifita excelled under new offensive coordinator Seth Doege, setting the school record for passing touchdowns and earning all-Big 12 honors, while the Wildcats finished the regular season 9–4 and beat Arizona State 23–7. Arizona lost in the Holiday Bowl to SMU.

Brennan was signed to a contract extension through 2030 on February 6, 2026.

== Personal life ==
Brennan's family lineage can be traced to the Mungers in Saratoga Springs, New York, where Salmon Munger was a Patriot who fought in the American Revolutionary War. His father Steve played for San Jose State in 1967 while his mother Beth was a cheerleader at the university. He is a first cousin of former Hawaii quarterback Colt Brennan.

Brennan and his wife Courtney have been married since 2000. They have three children.

== Head coaching record ==
Year	Team	Overall	Conference	Standing	Bowl/playoffs	Coaches^{#}	AP^{°}
San Jose State Spartans (Mountain West Conference) (2017–2023)
2017	San Jose State	2–11	1–7	T–5th (West)			
2018	San Jose State	1–11	1–7	6th (West)			
2019	San Jose State	5–7	2–6	T–4th (West)			
2020	San Jose State	7–1	7–0	1st	L Arizona	24	24
2021	San Jose State	5–7	3–5	5th (West)			
2022	San Jose State	7–5	5–3	T–2nd (West)	L Famous Idaho Potato		
2023	San Jose State	7–6	6–2	T–1st	L Hawaii		
San Jose State:		34–48 (.415)	25–30 (.455)				
Arizona Wildcats (Big 12 Conference) (2024–present)
2024	Arizona	4–8	2–7	T–13th			
2025	Arizona	9–4	6–3	T–4th	L Holiday		
2026	Arizona	8–3	5–3				
Arizona:		21–15 (.583)	13–13 (.500)				
Total:		55–63 (.466)					
National championship Conference title Conference division title or championship game berth
