= 2023 Coastal Carolina Chanticleers football team =

American college football season

2023 Coastal Carolina Chanticleers football

Hawaii Bowl champion

Hawaii Bowl, W 24–14 vs. San Jose State
- Conference: Sun Belt Conference
- East Division
- Record: 8–5 (5–3 Sun Belt)
- Head coach: Tim Beck (1st season)
- Offensive coordinator: Travis Trickett (1st season)
- Offensive scheme: Multiple
- Defensive coordinator: Craig Naivar (1st season)
- Base defense: 4–2–5
- Home stadium: Brooks Stadium

2023 Sun Belt Conference football standings
	Conf.			Overall
Team	W		L	W		L
East Division
James Madison* x	7	–	1	11	–	2
Appalachian State y	6	–	2	9	–	5
Coastal Carolina	5	–	3	8	–	5
Old Dominion	5	–	3	6	–	7
Georgia State	3	–	5	7	–	6
Marshall	3	–	5	6	–	7
Georgia Southern	3	–	5	6	–	7
West Division
Troy xy$	7	–	1	11	–	3
Texas State	4	–	4	8	–	5
Arkansas State	4	–	4	6	–	7
South Alabama	4	–	4	7	–	6
Louisiana	3	–	5	6	–	7
Southern Miss	2	–	6	3	–	9
Louisiana–Monroe	0	–	8	2	–	10
Championship: Troy 49, Appalachian State 23
$ – Conference champion; x – Division champion/co-champions; y – Championship game participant; * – Ineligible for postseason play due to FCS-to-FBS transition rules

The 2023 Coastal Carolina Chanticleers football team represented Coastal Carolina University as a member of the East Division of the Sun Belt Conference during the 2023 NCAA Division I FBS football season. Led by first-year head coach Tim Beck, the Chanticleers compiled an overall record of 8–5 with a record 5–3 in conference play, tying for third place in the Sun Belt's East Division. Coastal Carolina was invited to the Hawaii Bowl, defeating San Jose State. The team played home games at Brooks Stadium in Conway, South Carolina.

== Preseason ==
=== Media poll ===
In the Sun Belt preseason coaches' poll, the Chanticleers were picked to finish in third place in the East division.

Grayson McCall was named the Preseason Offensive Player of the Year. Quarterback Grayson McCall, Wide receivers Jared Brown and Sam Pinckney, and linebacker JT Killen were named to the preseason All-Sun Belt first team. Offensive lineman Will McDonald was named to the second team.

== Offseason ==
=== Coaching changes ===
With Chadwell leaving for Liberty, there were several changes to the team's coaching staff. On December 18, 2022, the Chanticleers hired SMU's Craig Naivar as the team's defensive coordinator. At SMU he was their safeties and special teams coach. On January 6, 2023, Travis Trickett was named the team's offensive coordinator and Xavier Dye was named running backs coach. They both had the same roles at South Florida. The same day, Beck made more announcements for his coaching staff. He named Derek Warehime the offensive line coach, Kriss Procter the tight ends coach, Perry Parks the receivers coach, Jimmy Brumbaugh as the defensive line coach, Curtis Fuller the cornerbacks coach, and Josh Miller the outside linebackers and special teams coach. Additionally Quinn Barham was named the director of football speed.

== Schedule ==
The football schedule was announced February 24, 2023.

Date	Time	Opponent	Site	TV	Result	Attendance
September 2	10:30 p.m.	at UCLA*	The Rose Bowl; Pasadena, CA	ESPN	L 13–27	43,705
September 9	7:00 p.m.	Jacksonville State*	Brooks Stadium; Conway, SC	ESPN+	W 30–16	16,006
September 16	7:00 p.m.	Duquesne*	Brooks Stadium; Conway, SC	ESPN+	W 66–7	18,116
September 21	7:30 p.m.	Georgia State	Brooks Stadium; Conway, SC	ESPN	L 17–30	15,248
September 30	7:00 p.m.	at Georgia Southern	Paulson Stadium; Statesboro, GA	NFLN	L 28–38	26,483
October 10	7:30 p.m.	at Appalachian State	Kidd Brewer Stadium; Boone, NC	ESPN2	W 27–24	34,252
October 21	7:00 p.m.	at Arkansas State	Centennial Bank Stadium; Jonesboro, AR	ESPN+	W 27–17	18,228
October 28	6:00 p.m.	Marshall^{†}	Brooks Stadium; Conway, SC	NFLN	W 34–6	21,324
November 4	3:30 p.m.	at Old Dominion	S.B. Ballard Stadium; Norfolk, VA	ESPN+	W 28–24	17,982
November 11	3:30 p.m.	Texas State	Brooks Stadium; Conway, SC	ESPN+	W 31–23	15,832
November 18	12:00 p.m.	at Army*	Michie Stadium; West Point, NY	CBSSN	L 21–28	26,867
November 25	3:30 p.m.	James Madison	Brooks Stadium; Conway, SC	ESPN2	L 14–56	16,196
December 23	10:30 p.m.	vs. San Jose State*	Clarence T. C. Ching Athletics Complex; Honolulu, Hawaii (Hawaii Bowl)	ESPN	W 24–14	7,089
*Non-conference game; ^{†}Homecoming; All times are in Eastern time

== Rankings ==
Ranking movements Legend: ██ Increase in ranking ██ Decrease in ranking — = Not ranked RV = Received votes
	Week															
Poll	Pre	1	2	3	4	5	6	7	8	9	10	11	12	13	14	Final
AP	RV	—	—	—	—	—	—	—	—	—	—	—	—			
Coaches	—	—	—	—	—	—	—	—	—	—	—	—	—			
CFP	Not released									—	—	—	—			Not released
