= 2023 Birmingham Bowl =

Postseason college football bowl game

2023 76 Birmingham Bowl
- 17th Birmingham Bowl
Troy Trojans	Duke Blue Devils
(11–2)	(7–5)
Sun Belt	ACC
10	17
Head coach: Greg Gasparato (interim)	Head coach: Trooper Taylor (interim)
	1	2	3	4	Total
Troy	0	0	3	7	10
Duke	8	6	0	3	17
- Date: December 23, 2023
- Season: 2023
- Stadium: Protective Stadium
- Location: Birmingham, Alabama
- MVP: Chandler Rivers (CB, Duke)
- Favorite: Troy by 7.5
- Referee: Nolan Dumas (Mountain West)
- Attendance: 20,023

United States TV coverage
- Network: ABC
- Announcers: Tom Hart (play-by-play), Cole Cubelic (analyst), and Dawn Davenport (sideline)

The 2023 Birmingham Bowl was a college football bowl game played on December 23, 2023, at Protective Stadium in Birmingham, Alabama. The 17th annual Birmingham Bowl featured the Troy Trojans from the Sun Belt Conference and the Duke Blue Devils from the Atlantic Coast Conference. The game began at approximately 11:00 a.m. CST and was aired on ABC. The Birmingham Bowl was one of the 2023–24 bowl games concluding the 2023 FBS football season. The game was sponsored by gas station chain 76 and was officially known as the 76 Birmingham Bowl.

== Teams ==
The game featured Sun Belt Conference champion Troy Trojans and the Duke Blue Devils from the Atlantic Coast Conference (ACC). This was the third meeting between Troy and Duke; the Blue Devils defeated the Trojans in both prior meetings. It was also both teams' first appearance in the Birmingham Bowl.

=== Troy Trojans ===
The Trojans entered the game with a 11–2 record (7–1 in the Sun Belt). After clinching their conference's West Division title, the Trojans defeated Appalachian State, 49–23, in the Sun Belt Championship Game to capture their eighth Sun Belt title.

=== Duke Blue Devils ===
The Blue Devils entered the game with a 7–5 record (4–4 in the ACC), tied for sixth place in their conference. Their quarterback, Riley Leonard transferred to Notre Dame, while their backup, Henry Belin IV, had an "upper-body" injury. It meant that their 3rd stringer true freshman quarterback Grayson Loftis had to start.

== Game summary ==
2023 76 Birmingham Bowl

Quarter	1	2	3	4	Total
Troy	0	0	3	7	10
Duke	8	6	0	3	17

at Protective Stadium • Birmingham, Alabama

- Date: Tuesday, December 23, 2023
- Game time: 11:00 a.m. CST
- Game weather: Sunny• Temperature: 60 °F (16 °C) • Wind: 5 mph (8.0 km/h) NW
- Game attendance: 20,023
- Referee: Nolan Dumas
- TV announcers (ABC): Tom Hart (play-by-play), Cole Cubelic (analyst), and Dawn Davenport (sideline)
- Box score

Game information

First Quarter

- (2:29) DUKE – Jaylen Coleman 1 yard run, Nicky Dalmolin 2-point run conversion (Drive: 7 plays, 64 yards, 3:33; Duke 8–0)

Second Quarter

- (6:51) DUKE – Todd Pelino 34 yard field goal (Drive: 11 plays, 50 yards, 5:23; Duke 11–0)
- (0:00) DUKE – Todd Pelino 37 yard field goal (Drive: 17 plays, 54 yards, 6:24; Duke 14–0)

Third Quarter

- (1:36) TROY – Scott Taylor Renfroe 44 yard field goal (Drive: 10 plays, 53 yards, 5:29; Duke 14–3)

Fourth Quarter

- (13:29) DUKE – Todd Pelino 45 yard field goal (Drive: 6 plays, 47 yards, 3:07; Duke 17–3)
- (5:54) TROY – Derrick Graham 2 yard run, Scott Taylor Renfroe kick (Drive: 10 plays, 87 yards, 3:13; Duke 17–10)

=== Statistics ===
Statistics	TROY	DUKE
First downs	17	19
Plays–yards	64–330	67–330
Rushes–yards	26–89	38–147
Passing yards	241	183
Passing: comp–att–int	22–38–1	19–29–1
Time of possession	27:56	32:04

Team	Category	Player	Statistics
Troy	Passing	Gunnar Watson	21/36, 230 yards, INT
Troy	Rushing	Kimani Vidal	17 carries, 79 yards
Troy	Receiving	Jabre Barber	10 receptions, 107 yards
Duke	Passing	Grayson Loftis	19/29, 183 yards, INT
Duke	Rushing	Jaquez Moore	14 carries, 73 yards
Duke	Receiving	Sahmir Hagans	5 receptions, 55 yards
