= 2023 Army Black Knights football team =

American college football season

2023 Army Black Knights football
- Conference: Independent
- Record: 6–6
- Head coach: Jeff Monken (10th season)
- Offensive coordinator: Drew Thatcher (1st season)
- Offensive scheme: Gun option
- Defensive coordinator: Nate Woody (4th season)
- Base defense: 3–4
- Home stadium: Michie Stadium

2023 NCAA Division I FBS independents football records
	Conf.			Overall
Team	W		L	W		L
No. 14 Notre Dame		–		10	–	3
Army		–		6	–	6
UConn		–		3	–	9
UMass		–		3	–	9
Rankings from AP Poll

The 2023 Army Black Knights football team represented the United States Military Academy in the 2023 NCAA Division I FBS football season. The Black Knights were led by 10th-year head coach Jeff Monken and played their home games at Michie Stadium in West Point, New York. They competed as an independent and finished with a 6–6 record—the team was not invited to a bowl game as they had not met bowl eligibility requirements when bowl matchups were announced in early December. Even if they had accumulated six wins at that time, two of their wins were against FCS opponents.

This was the Black Knights' last season competing as an independent, as Army joined the American Athletic Conference as a football-only member beginning in 2024.

== Schedule ==
Date	Time	Opponent	Site	TV	Result	Attendance
September 2	7:00 p.m.	at Louisiana–Monroe	Malone Stadium; Monroe, LA	NFLN	L 13–17	18,914
September 9	12:00 p.m.	Delaware State	Michie Stadium; West Point, NY	CBSSN	W 57–0	25,153
September 15	7:00 p.m.	at UTSA	Alamodome; San Antonio, TX	ESPN	W 37–29	27,138
September 23	12:00 p.m.	at Syracuse	JMA Wireless Dome; Syracuse, NY	ACCN	L 16–29	37,594
October 7	12:00 p.m.	Boston College	Michie Stadium; West Point, NY	CBSSN	L 24–27	34,017
October 14	3:30 p.m.	Troy^{†}	Michie Stadium; West Point, NY	CBSSN	L 0–19	27,829
October 21	7:30 p.m.	at No. 19 LSU	Tiger Stadium; Baton Rouge, LA	SECN	L 0–62	101,776
October 28	12:00 p.m.	UMass	Michie Stadium; West Point, NY	CBSSN	L 14–21	29,625
November 4	2:30 p.m.	vs. No. 25 Air Force	Empower Field at Mile High; Denver, CO (Commander-in-Chief's Trophy)	CBSSN	W 23–3	52,401
November 11	12:00 p.m.	Holy Cross	Michie Stadium; West Point, NY	CBSSN	W 17–14	30,602
November 18	12:00 p.m.	Coastal Carolina	Michie Stadium; West Point, NY	CBSSN	W 28–21	26,867
December 9	3:00 p.m.	vs. Navy	Gillette Stadium; Foxborough, MA (Army–Navy Game, Commander-in-Chief's Trophy, College GameDay)	CBS	W 17–11	65,878
^{†}Homecoming; Rankings from AP Poll (and CFP Rankings, after November 1) - Released prior to game; All times are in Eastern time

== Game summaries ==
=== at Louisiana–Monroe ===
Army Black Knights at Louisiana–Monroe Warhawks

Quarter	1	2	3	4	Total
Black Knights	0	10	0	3	13
Warhawks	0	3	0	14	17

at Malone Stadium, Monroe, LA

- Date: September 2, 2023
- Game time: 6:00 p.m. CDT
- Game weather: Temperature: 97 °F (36 °C) • Wind: NE 9 mph • Weather: Sunny
- Game attendance: 18,914
- Referee: Wayne Winkler
- TV announcers (NFLN): Doug Sherman (play-by-play) & Tyoka Jackson (analyst)
- ESPN – ULM scores two late touchdowns to rally past Army 17–13 in season opener /// Box Score, Army at Louisiana–Monroe /// Army Pregame Notes /// Louisiana–Monroe Pregame Notes /// Postgame Notes

Game information

First quarter

No scoring

Second quarter

- (06:20) ULM FG – Derek McCormick 24-yard field goal
  Drive: 8 plays, 38 yards, 2:44; Louisiana–Monroe 3–0
- (02:38) ARMY TD – Bo Nicolas-Paul 44-yard interception return, Quinn Maretzki kick
  Drive: 0 plays, 0 yards, 0:00; Army 7–3
- (00:07) ARMY FG – Quinn Maretzki 22-yard field goal
  Drive: 6 plays, 15 yards, 1:21; Army 10–3

Third quarter

No scoring

Fourth quarter

- (12:53) ARMY FG – Quinn Maretzki 28-yard field goal
  Drive: 9 plays, 58 yards, 5:13; Army 13–3
- (05:43) ULM TD – Hunter Smith 62-yard rush, Derek McCormick kick
  Drive: 1 play, 62 yards, 0:11; Army 13–10
- (02:48) ULM TD – Tyrone Howell 9-yard pass from Hunter Herring, Derek McCormick kick
  Drive: 4 plays, 45 yards, 2:00; Louisiana–Monroe 17–13

Passing

- ARMY – Bryson Daily: 5/11, 121 yards, 2 INT
- ULM – Jiya Wright: 11/22, 69 yards, 2 INT

Rushing

- ARMY – Bryson Daily: 23 carries, 63 yards
- ULM – Hunter Smith: 7 carries, 103 yards, 1 TD

Receiving

- ARMY – Liam Fortner: 1 reception, 53 yards
- ULM – Tyrone Howell: 9 receptions, 67 yards, 1 TD

Defense

- ARMY – Jimmy Ciarlo: 7 total tackles (4 solo, 3 assisted), 1.5 tackles for loss, 1.0 sacks
- ULM – Ja'Terious Evans: 11 total tackles (3 solo, 8 assisted), 1.5 tackles for loss, 1 interception

Statistics	ARMY	ULM
First downs	13	16
3rd down efficiency	6–15	4–15
4th down efficiency	0–0	1–1
Plays–yards	62–279	63–298
Rushes–yards	50–172	32–207
Passing yards	107	91
Passing: Comp–Att–Int	6–12–2	15–31–2
Penalties–yards	3–35	5–35
Turnovers	5	2
Time of possession	33:38	26:22

=== Delaware State ===
Delaware State Hornets at Army Black Knights

Quarter	1	2	3	4	Total
Hornets	0	0	0	0	0
Black Knights	15	21	7	14	57

at Michie Stadium, West Point, NY

- Date: September 9, 2023
- Game time: 12:00 p.m. EDT
- Game weather: Temperature: 75 °F (24 °C) • Weather: Cloudy
- Game attendance: 25,153
- Referee: Jeff Heaser
- TV announcers (CBSSN): Dave Ryan (play-by-play), Adam Breneman (analyst) & Tina Cervasio (sideline)
- ESPN – Bryson Daily's 5 TDs help Army beat FCS foe Delaware State 57–0 /// Box Score, Delaware State at Army /// Army Pregame Notes /// Postgame Notes

Game information

First quarter

- (08:00) ARMY TD – Bryson Daily 13-yard rush, Hayden Reed rush
  Drive: 10 plays, 39 yards, 4:58; Army 7–0
- (01:33) ARMY TD – Isaiah Alston 59-yard pass from Bryson Daily, Quinn Maretzki kick
  Drive: 2 plays, 65 yards, 0:41; Army 15–0

Second quarter

- (08:01) ARMY TD – Bryson Daily 4-yard rush, Quinn Maretzki kick
  Drive: 6 plays, 25 yards, 3:12; Army 22–0
- (03:14) ARMY TD – Isaiah Alston 70-yard pass from Bryson Daily, Quinn Maretzki kick
  Drive: 1 play, 70 yards, 0:14; Army 29–0
- (02:58) ARMY TD – Tyson Riley 16-yard pass from Bryson Daily, Quinn Maretzki kick
  Drive: 1 play, 16 yards, 0:07; Army 36–0

Third quarter

- (01:12) ARMY TD – Jakobi Buchanan 1-yard rush, Quinn Maretzki kick
  Drive: 13 plays, 80 yards, 6:26; Army 43–0

Fourth quarter

- (12:20) ARMY TD – Larry Robinson 23-yard rush, Carlos Alvarado kick
  Drive: 3 plays, 44 yards, 1:16; Army 50–0
- (07:36) ARMY TD – Kanye Udoh 5-yard rush, Carlos Alvarado kick
  Drive: 5 plays, 37 yards, 2:20; Army 57–0

Passing

- DSU – Marqui Adams: 14/24, 170 yards
- ARMY – Bryson Daily: 8/11, 193 yards, 3 TD

Rushing

- DSU – Marquis Gillis: 10 carries, 28 yards
- ARMY – Bryson Daily: 9 carries, 65 yards, 2 TD

Receiving

- DSU – Jordan Hull: 4 receptions, 53 yards
- ARMY – Isaiah Alston: 3 receptions, 135 yards, 2 TD

Defense

- DSU – Romell Harris-Freeman: 7 total tackles (6 solo, 1 assisted)
- ARMY – Leo Lowin: 10 total tackles (7 solo, 3 assisted), 1 forced fumble

Statistics	DSU	ARMY
First downs	16	23
3rd down efficiency	6–16	2–7
4th down efficiency	0–2	4–4
Plays–yards	68–219	58–519
Rushes–yards	34–24	43–281
Passing yards	195	238
Passing: Comp–Att–Int	20–34–0	11–15–0
Penalties–yards	6–45	4–50
Turnovers	2	1
Time of possession	31:39	28:21

=== at UTSA ===
Army Black Knights at UTSA Roadrunners

Quarter	1	2	3	4	Total
Black Knights	14	6	10	7	37
Roadrunners	0	14	7	8	29

at Alamodome, San Antonio, TX

- Date: September 15, 2023
- Game time: 6:00 p.m. CDT
- Game weather: Temperature: 72 °F (22 °C) • Weather: Indoor
- Game attendance: 27,138
- Referee: Tim Rich
- TV announcers (ESPN): Anish Shroff (play-by-play), Andre Ware (analyst) & Paul Carcaterra (sideline)
- ESPN – Army starts fast, holds off UTSA 37–29 /// Box Score, Army at UTSA /// Army Pregame Notes /// UTSA Pregame Notes /// Postgame Notes

Game information

First quarter

- (07:32) ARMY TD – Hayden Reed 1-yard rush, Quinn Maretzki kick
  Drive: 16 plays, 75 yards, 7:28; Army 7–0
- (01:15) ARMY TD – Jakobi Buchanan 10-yard rush, Quinn Maretzki kick
  Drive: 9 plays, 41 yards, 5:51; Army 14–0

Second quarter

- (12:45) UTSA TD – Robert Henry 19-yard rush, Chase Allen kick
  Drive: 11 plays, 75 yards, 3:30; Army 14–7
- (07:59) ARMY FG – Quinn Maretzki 23-yard field goal
  Drive: 8 plays, 69 yards, 4:46; Army 17–7
- (01:06) ARMY FG – Quinn Maretzki 45-yard field goal
  Drive: 13 plays, 45 yards, 4:44; Army 20–7
- (00:00) UTSA TD – Tykee Ogle-Kellogg 46-yard pass from Eddie Lee Marburger, Chase Allen kick
  Drive: 9 plays, 75 yards, 1:06; Army 20–14

Third quarter

- (09:13) ARMY FG – Quinn Maretzki 36-yard field goal
  Drive: 7 plays, 30 yards, 4:06; Army 23–14
- (07:04) UTSA TD – Joshua Cephus 44-yard pass from Eddie Lee Marburger, Chase Allen kick
  Drive: 6 plays, 75 yards, 2:09; Army 23–21
- (06:09) ARMY TD – Noah Short 25-yard pass from Bryson Daily, Quinn Maretzki kick
  Drive: 2 plays, 80 yards, 0:48; Army 30–21

Fourth quarter

- (06:45) ARMY TD – Bryson Daily 3-yard rush, Quinn Maretzki kick
  Drive: 14 plays, 70 yards, 8:37; Army 37–21
- (06:12) UTSA TD – Devin McCuin 72-yard pass from Eddie Lee Marburger, Devin McCuin pass
  Drive: 2 plays, 75 yards, 0:33; Army 37–29

Passing

- ARMY – Bryson Daily: 7/17, 133 yards, 1 TD
- UTSA – Eddie Lee Marburger: 17/25, 239 yards, 3 TD

Rushing

- ARMY – Hayden Reed: 20 carries, 107 yards, 1 TD
- UTSA – Rocko Griffin: 7 carries, 53 yards

Receiving

- ARMY – Isaiah Alston: 2 receptions, 68 yards
- UTSA – Joshua Cephus: 8 receptions, 84 yards, 1 TD

Defense

- ARMY – Leo Lowin: 7 total tackles (4 solo, 3 assisted)
- UTSA – Martavius French: 10 total tackles (4 solo, 6 assisted), 0.5 tackles for loss, 1 quarterback hurry

Statistics	ARMY	UTSA
First downs	23	14
3rd down efficiency	8–20	4–10
4th down efficiency	6–6	1–2
Plays–yards	83–442	49–360
Rushes–yards	65–254	22–121
Passing yards	188	239
Passing: Comp–Att–Int	8–18–0	17–27–0
Penalties–yards	0–0	5–35
Turnovers	0	1
Time of possession	44:25	15:35

=== at Syracuse ===
Army Black Knights at Syracuse Orange

Quarter	1	2	3	4	Total
Black Knights	7	3	0	6	16
Orange	0	3	13	13	29

at JMA Wireless Dome, Syracuse, NY

- Date: September 23, 2023
- Game time: 12:00 p.m. EDT
- Game weather: Weather: Indoor
- Game attendance: 37,594
- Referee: Tim Hedgepeth
- TV announcers (ACCN): Chris Cotter (play-by-play), Mark Herzlich (analyst) & Sherree Burruss (sideline)
- ESPN – Syracuse scores 26 unanswered points after sluggish start to defeat Army 29–16 and stay unbeaten /// Box Score, Army at Syracuse /// Army Pregame Notes /// Syracuse Pregame Notes /// Postgame Notes

Game information

First quarter

- (05:35) ARMY TD – Jakobi Buchanan 1-yard rush, Cole Talley kick
  Drive: 17 plays, 75 yards, 9:25; Army 7–0

Second quarter

- (13:29) CUSE FG – Brady Denaburg 46-yard field goal
  Drive: 9 plays, 42 yards, 3:47; Army 7–3
- (00:29) ARMY FG – Quinn Maretzki 38-yard field goal
  Drive: 19 plays, 64 yards, 9:20; Army 10–3

Third quarter

- (07:59) CUSE TD – LeQuint Allen 13-yard rush, Brady Denaburg kick
  Drive: 4 plays, 66 yards, 1:44; Tied 10–10
- (02:01) CUSE TD – Umari Hatcher 13-yard pass from Garrett Shrader, Brady Denaburg kick failed
  Drive: 10 plays, 91 yards, 3:41; Syracuse 16–10

Fourth quarter

- (11:36) CUSE FG – Brady Denaburg 30-yard field goal
  Drive: 9 plays, 47 yards, 4:13; Syracuse 19–10
- (09:46) CUSE TD – Garrett Shrader 21-yard rush, Brady Denaburg kick
  Drive: 2 plays, 27 yards, 0:31; Syracuse 26–10
- (06:05) CUSE FG – Brady Denaburg 31-yard field goal
  Drive: 6 plays, 13 yards, 3:05; Syracuse 29–10
- (02:32) ARMY TD – Noah Short 80-yard pass from Bryson Daily, Bryson Daily pass failed
  Drive: 1 play, 80 yards, 0:11; Syracuse 29–16

Passing

- ARMY – Bryson Daily: 9/21, 145 yards, 1 TD, 2 INT
- CUSE – Garrett Shrader: 21/26, 245 yards, 1 TD, 1 INT

Rushing

- ARMY – Bryson Daily: 20 carries, 47 yards
- CUSE – LeQuint Allen: 21 carries, 104 yards, 1 TD

Receiving

- ARMY – Noah Short: 6 receptions, 105 yards, 1 TD
- CUSE – Damien Alford: 9 receptions, 135 yards

Defense

- ARMY – Leo Lowin: 8 total tackles (3 solo, 5 assisted)
- CUSE – Alijah Clark: 8 total tackles (6 solo, 2 assisted), 1 tackle for loss

Statistics	ARMY	CUSE
First downs	16	20
3rd down efficiency	6–17	3–11
4th down efficiency	3–4	1–2
Plays–yards	67–270	63–403
Rushes–yards	46–125	37–158
Passing yards	145	245
Passing: Comp–Att–Int	9–21–2	21–26–1
Penalties–yards	2–15	6–65
Turnovers	2	1
Time of possession	33:20	26:40

=== Boston College ===
Boston College Eagles at Army Black Knights

Quarter	1	2	3	4	Total
Eagles	6	7	7	7	27
Black Knights	0	3	14	7	24

at Michie Stadium, West Point, NY

- Date: October 7, 2023
- Game time: 12:00 p.m. EDT
- Game weather: Temperature: 68 °F (20 °C) • Wind: SE 1 mph • Weather: Rain
- Game attendance: 34,017
- Referee: Riley Johnson
- TV announcers (CBSSN): Chris Lewis (play-by-play), Ross Tucker (analyst) & Tina Cervasio (sideline)
- ESPN – Castellanos rushes for 4 TDs, including winner with 25 seconds left, as BC beats Army 27–24 /// Box Score, Boston College at Army /// Army Pregame Notes /// Boston College Pregame Notes /// Postgame Notes

Game information

First quarter

- (07:35) BC TD – Thomas Castellanos 20-yard rush, Liam Connor kick failed
  Drive: 5 plays, 40 yards, 2:21; Boston College 6–0

Second quarter

- (10:08) ARMY FG – Quinn Maretzki 22-yard field goal
  Drive: 6 plays, 38 yards, 2:47; Boston College 6–3
- (01:24) BC TD – Thomas Castellanos 4-yard rush, Liam Connor kick
  Drive: 17 plays, 75 yards, 8:44; Boston College 13–3

Third quarter

- (10:48) ARMY TD – Tyrell Robinson 10-yard rush, Quinn Maretzki kick
  Drive: 6 plays, 37 yards, 4:12; Boston College 13–10
- (07:36) BC TD – Thomas Castellanos 10-yard rush, Liam Connor kick
  Drive: 6 plays, 75 yards, 3:12; Boston College 20–10
- (02:51) ARMY TD – Hayden Reed 6-yard rush, Quinn Maretzki kick
  Drive: 8 plays, 69 yards, 4:45; Boston College 20–17

Fourth quarter

- (11:43) ARMY TD – Tyson Riley 9-yard pass from Bryson Daily, Quinn Maretzki kick
  Drive: 7 plays, 61 yards, 3:40; Army 24–20
- (00:25) BC TD – Thomas Castellanos 1-yard rush, Liam Connor kick
  Drive: 12 plays, 62 yards, 4:59; Boston College 27–24

Passing

- BC – Thomas Castellanos: 4/9, 51 yards, 1 INT
- ARMY – Bryson Daily: 10/13, 105 yards, 1 TD

Rushing

- BC – Thomas Castellanos: 31 carries, 142 yards, 4 TD
- ARMY – Bryson Daily: 14 carries, 99 yards

Receiving

- BC – Jaden Williams: 1 reception, 35 yards
- ARMY – Casey Reynolds: 2 receptions, 37 yards

Defense

- BC – Vinny DePalma: 9 total tackles (6 solo, 3 assisted)
- ARMY – Quindrelin Hammonds: 11 total tackles (6 solo, 5 assisted), 1 interception

Statistics	BC	ARMY
First downs	19	12
3rd down efficiency	8–17	3–10
4th down efficiency	3–4	0–0
Plays–yards	70–372	46–266
Rushes–yards	61–321	33–161
Passing yards	51	105
Passing: Comp–Att–Int	4–9–1	10–13–0
Penalties–yards	3–25	6–30
Turnovers	1	1
Time of possession	34:30	25:30

=== Troy ===
Troy Trojans at Army Black Knights

Quarter	1	2	3	4	Total
Trojans	3	13	3	0	19
Black Knights	0	0	0	0	0

at Michie Stadium, West Point, NY

- Date: October 14, 2023
- Game time: 3:30 EDT
- Game weather: Temperature: 50 °F (10 °C) • Wind: N 4 mph • Weather: Rain
- Game attendance: 27,829
- Referee: Marcus Woods
- TV announcers (CBSSN): Dave Ryan (play-by-play), Adam Breneman (analyst) & Tina Cervasio (sideline)
- ESPN – Troy uses 4 field goals and smothering defense to blank Army 19–0 /// Box Score, Troy at Army /// Army Pregame Notes /// Troy Pregame Notes /// Postgame Notes

Game information

First quarter

- (07:55) TROY FG – Scott Taylor Renfroe 24-yard field goal
  Drive: 8 plays, 63 yards, 4:07; Troy 3–0

Second quarter

- (10:35) TROY FG – Scott Taylor Renfroe 35-yard field goal
  Drive: 6 plays, 17 yards, 3:05; Troy 6–0
- (07:31) TROY FG – Scott Taylor Renfroe 32-yard field goal
  Drive: 5 plays, 35 yards, 1:12; Troy 9–0
- (00:38) TROY TD – Chris Lewis 52-yard pass from Gunnar Watson, Scott Taylor Renfroe kick
  Drive: 4 plays, 63 yards, 0:43; Troy 16–0

Third quarter

- (10:09) TROY FG – Scott Taylor Renfroe 43-yard field goal
  Drive: 10 plays, 49 yards, 4:51; Troy 19–0

Fourth quarter

- No scoring

Passing

- TROY – Gunnar Watson: 10/21, 227 yards, 1 TD
- ARMY – Champ Harris: 6/13, 63 yards, 1 INT

Rushing

- TROY – Kimani Vidal: 23 carries, 116 yards
- ARMY – Kanye Udoh: 18 carries, 124 yards

Receiving

- TROY – Jabre Barber: 4 receptions, 138 yards
- ARMY – Tobi Olawole: 2 receptions, 22 yards

Defense

- TROY – Jayden McDonald: 13 total tackles (6 solo, 7 assisted), 2.0 tackles for loss solo tackles, 0.5 sacks
- ARMY – Kalib Fortner: 10 total tackles (4 solo, 6 assisted)

Statistics	TROY	ARMY
First downs	15	17
3rd down efficiency	4–13	2–13
4th down efficiency	0–2	1–5
Plays–yards	60–449	69–255
Rushes–yards	39–222	51–177
Passing yards	227	78
Passing: Comp–Att–Int	10–21–0	9–18–1
Penalties–yards	9–80	5–31
Turnovers	1	4
Time of possession	30:08	29:52

=== at No. 19 LSU ===
Army Black Knights at No. 19 LSU Tigers

Quarter	1	2	3	4	Total
Black Knights	0	0	0	0	0
No. 19 Tigers	14	24	10	14	62

at Tiger Stadium, Baton Rouge, LA

- Date: October 21, 2023
- Game time: 6:30 p.m. CDT
- Game weather: Temperature: 84 °F (29 °C) • Wind: SE 4 mph • Weather: Sunny
- Game attendance: 101,776
- Referee: Jason Autrey
- TV announcers (SECN): Tom Hart (play-by-play), Jordan Rodgers (analyst) & Cole Cubelic (sideline)
- ESPN – Jayden Daniels throws for 3 TDs, runs for another score as No. 19 LSU routs Army 62–0 /// Box Score, Army at No. 19 LSU /// Army Pregame Notes /// LSU Pregame Notes /// Postgame Notes

Game information

First quarter

- (12:05) LSU TD – Logan Diggs 2-yard rush, Damian Ramos kick
  Drive: 8 plays, 75 yards, 2:55; LSU 7–0
- (05:26) LSU TD – Brian Thomas Jr. 86-yard pass from Jayden Daniels, Damian Ramos kick
  Drive: 2 plays, 92 yards, 0:52; LSU 14–0

Second quarter

- (14:22) LSU TD – Brian Thomas Jr. 8-yard pass from Jayden Daniels, Damian Ramos kick
  Drive: 3 plays, 33 yards, 1:13; LSU 21–0
- (09:08) LSU TD – Jayden Daniels 1-yard rush, Damian Ramos kick
  Drive: 5 plays, 37 yards, 2:20; LSU 28–0
- (02:19) LSU FG – Damian Ramos 35-yard field goal
  Drive: 7 plays, 24 yards, 2:42; LSU 31–0
- (00:57) LSU TD – Malik Nabers 26-yard pass from Jayden Daniels, Damian Ramos kick
  Drive: 3 plays, 72 yards, 0:27; LSU 38–0

Third quarter

- (09:07) LSU TD – Malik Nabers 51-yard pass from Garrett Nussmeier, Damian Ramos kick
  Drive: 4 plays, 72 yards, 1:22; LSU 45–0
- (01:48) LSU FG – Damian Ramos 32-yard field goal
  Drive: 11 plays, 20 yards, 5:25; LSU 48–0

Fourth quarter

- (04:40) LSU TD – Noah Cain 2-yard rush, Damian Ramos kick
  Drive: 13 plays, 60 yards, 8:20; LSU 55–0
- (00:40) LSU TD – Trey Holly 67-yard rush, Damian Ramos kick
  Drive: 3 plays, 70 yards, 1:53; LSU 62–0

Passing

- ARMY – Champ Harris: 4/9, 22 yards, 2 INT
- LSU – Jayden Daniels: 11/15, 279 yards, 3 TD

Rushing

- ARMY – Kanye Udoh: 21 carries, 108 yards
- LSU – Trey Holly: 6 carries, 91 yards, 1 TD

Receiving

- ARMY – Casey Reynolds: 4 receptions, 26 yards
- LSU – Brian Thomas Jr.: 3 receptions, 122 yards, 2 TD

Defense

- ARMY – Casey Larkin: 6 total tackles (4 solo, 2 assisted)
- LSU – Omar Speights: 9 total tackles (3 solo, 6 assisted)

Statistics	ARMY	LSU
First downs	12	23
3rd down efficiency	4–11	6–10
4th down efficiency	0–3	1–1
Plays–yards	58–193	60–570
Rushes–yards	43–151	33–201
Passing yards	42	369
Passing: Comp–Att–Int	6–15–3	18–27–0
Penalties–yards	0–0	3–10
Turnovers	4	0
Time of possession	31:49	28:11

=== UMass ===
UMass Minutemen at Army Black Knights

Quarter	1	2	3	4	Total
Minutemen	13	0	8	0	21
Black Knights	0	7	0	7	14

at Michie Stadium, West Point, NY

- Date: October 28, 2023
- Game time: 12:00 p.m. EDT
- Game weather: Temperature: 73 °F (23 °C) • Wind: NW 9 mph • Weather: Sunny
- Game attendance: 29,625
- Referee: Stuart Mullins
- TV announcers (CBSSN): Dave Ryan (play-by-play), Adam Breneman (analyst) & Tina Cervasio (sideline)
- ESPN – Lynch–Adams rushes for 234 yards, 3 TDs and UMass beats Army 21–14 to end seven–game losing streak /// Box Score, UMass at Army /// Army Pregame Notes /// UMass Pregame Notes /// Postgame Notes

Game information

First quarter

- (11:32) UMASS TD – Kay'Ron Lynch–Adams 34-yard rush, Cameron Carson kick failed
  Drive: 9 plays, 75 yards, 3:28; UMass 6–0
- (03:30) UMASS TD – Kay'Ron Lynch–Adams 9-yard rush, Cameron Carson kick
  Drive: 9 plays, 68 yards, 5:14; UMass 13–0

Second quarter

- (02:34) ARMY TD – Bryson Daily 2-yard rush, Quinn Maretzki kick
  Drive: 16 plays, 76 yards, 8:37; UMass 13–7

Third quarter

- (07:33) UMASS TD – Kay'Ron Lynch–Adams 3-yard rush, George Johnson III pass from Taisun Phommachanh
  Drive: 6 plays, 30 yards, 3:42; UMass 21–7

Fourth quarter

- (05:01) ARMY TD – Champ Harris 36-yard rush, Quinn Maretzki kick
  Drive: 5 plays, 83 yards, 1:30; UMass 21–14

Passing

- UMASS – Taisun Phommachanh: 17/23, 121 yards
- ARMY – Champ Harris: 6/8, 130 yards

Rushing

- UMASS – Kay'Ron Lynch–Adams: 34 carries, 234 yards, 3 TD
- ARMY – Kanye Udoh: 15 carries, 76 yards

Receiving

- UMASS – Anthony Simpson: 7 receptions, 36 yards
- ARMY – Tobi Olawole: 2 receptions, 57 yards

Defense

- UMASS – Te'Rai Powell: 8 total tackles (5 solo, 3 assisted), 1 pass break-up
- ARMY – Quindrelin Hammonds: 8 total tackles (4 solo, 4 assisted), 0.5 tackles-for-loss

Statistics	UMASS	ARMY
First downs	19	19
3rd down efficiency	7–12	6–12
4th down efficiency	0–0	2–4
Plays–yards	60–352	63–362
Rushes–yards	37–231	42–204
Passing yards	121	158
Passing: Comp–Att–Int	17–23–0	9–21–2
Penalties–yards	8–50	1–12
Turnovers	0	3
Time of possession	31:37	28:23

=== vs. No. 25 Air Force ===
Army Black Knights vs. No. 25 Air Force Falcons

Quarter	1	2	3	4	Total
Black Knights	17	6	0	0	23
No. 25 Falcons	0	3	0	0	3

at Empower Field at Mile High, Denver, CO

- Date: November 4, 2023
- Game time: 12:30 p.m. MDT
- Game weather: • Weather: Sunny
- Game attendance: 52,401
- Referee: Marcus Woods
- TV announcers (CBSSN): John Sadak (play-by-play), Randy Cross (analyst) & Tina Cervasio (sideline)
- ESPN – Army's swarming defense forces 6 turnovers in 23–3 win, deals No. 17 Air Force first loss of season /// Box Score, Army vs. No. 25 Air Force /// Army Pregame Notes /// Air Force Pregame Notes /// Postgame Notes

Game information

First quarter

- (13:06) ARMY TD – Bryson Daily 62-yard rush, Quinn Maretzki kick
  Drive: 4 plays, 75 yards, 1:54; Army 7–0
- (09:42) ARMY FG – Quinn Maretzki 45-yard field goal
  Drive: 4 plays, 6 yards, 1:23; Army 10–0
- (01:53) ARMY TD – Bryson Daily 5-yard rush, Quinn Maretzki kick
  Drive: 11 plays, 43 yards, 6:12; Army 17–0

Second quarter

- (13:14) ARMY FG – Quinn Maretzki 40-yard field goal
  Drive: 6 plays, 24 yards, 3:01; Army 20–0
- (02:31) AF FG – Matthew Dapore 30-yard field goal
  Drive: 9 plays, 59 yards, 3:08; Army 20–3
- (00:00) ARMY FG – Quinn Maretzki 38-yard field goal
  Drive: 3 plays, 4 yards, 0:19; Army 23–3

Third quarter

No scoring

Fourth quarter

No scoring

Passing

- ARMY – Bryson Daily: 4/9, 40 yards
- AF – Zac Larrier: 9/22, 93 yards, 2 INT

Rushing

- ARMY – Bryson Daily: 36 carries, 170 yards, 2 TD
- AF – Zac Larrier: 20 carries, 45 yards

Receiving

- ARMY – Tyrell Robinson: 1 reception, 23 yards
- AF – Wyatt Wilson: 3 receptions, 47 yards

Defense

- ARMY – Leo Lowin: 12 total tackles (9 solo, 3 assisted), 2.0 tackles tackles-for-loss, 1.0 sack, 2 forced fumbles, 1 fumble recovery, 1 pass break-up
- AF – Jayden Goodwin: 12 total tackles (3 solo, 9 assisted), 0.5 tackles-for-loss

Statistics	ARMY	AF
First downs	11	19
3rd down efficiency	4–14	5–14
4th down efficiency	1–2	0–2
Plays–yards	60–253	64–259
Rushes–yards	51–213	40–155
Passing yards	40	104
Passing: Comp–Att–Int	4–9–0	10–24–2
Penalties–yards	11–119	6–55
Turnovers	0	6
Time of possession	32:09	27:51

=== Holy Cross ===
Holy Cross Crusaders at Army Black Knights

Quarter	1	2	3	4	Total
Crusaders	0	0	0	14	14
Black Knights	7	7	0	3	17

at Michie Stadium, West Point, NY

- Date: November 11, 2023
- Game time: 12:00 p.m. EST
- Game weather: Temperature: 48 °F (9 °C) • Wind: NW 10 mph • Weather: Cloudy
- Game attendance: 30,602
- Referee: Tim Hedgepeth
- TV announcers (CBSSN): Chris Lewis (play-by-play), Ross Tucker (analyst) & Tina Cervasio (sideline)
- ESPN – Army takes early lead, hangs on to defeat Holy Cross 17–14 /// Box Score, Holy Cross at Army /// Army Pregame Notes /// Holy Cross Pregame Notes /// Postgame Notes

Game information

First quarter

- (12:34) ARMY TD – Elo Modozie 12-yard blocked punt return, Quinn Maretzki kick
  Drive: 0 plays, 0 yards, 0:00; Army 7–0

Second quarter

- (11:14) ARMY TD – Tyrell Robinson 14-yard rush, Quinn Maretzki kick
  Drive: 8 plays, 67 yards, 4:28; Army 14–0

Third quarter

No scoring

Fourth quarter

- (11:47) HC TD – Justin Shorter 24-yard pass from Matthew Sluka, Luis Palenzuela kick
  Drive: 8 plays, 59 yards, 3:31; Army 14–7
- (04:59) ARMY FG – Quinn Maretzki 26-yard field goal
  Drive: 13 plays, 66 yards, 6:48; Army 17–7
- (02:05) HC TD – Jalen Coker 8-yard pass from Matthew Sluka, Luis Palenzuela kick
  Drive: 9 plays, 75 yards, 2:54; Army 17–14

Passing

- HC – Matthew Sluka: 16/23, 156 yards, 2 TD, 1 INT
- ARMY – Bryson Daily: 4/6, 79 yards

Rushing

- HC – Matthew Sluka: 37 carries, 171 yards
- ARMY – Bryson Daily: 19 carries, 83 yards

Receiving

- HC – Jalen Coker: 7 receptions, 54 yards, 1 TD
- ARMY – Casey Reynolds: 1 reception, 69 yards

Defense

- HC – Frankie Monte: 13 total tackles (8 solo, 5 assisted)
- ARMY – Leo Lowin: 12 total tackles (7 solo, 5 assisted), 2.0 tackles-for-loss, 2.0 sacks, 1 forced fumble

Statistics	HC	ARMY
First downs	26	11
3rd down efficiency	8–15	5–12
4th down efficiency	3–5	2–3
Plays–yards	71–395	47–269
Rushes–yards	48–239	41–190
Passing yards	156	79
Passing: Comp–Att–Int	16–23–1	4–6–0
Penalties–yards	8–65	6–68
Turnovers	2	0
Time of possession	32:22	27:38

=== Coastal Carolina ===
Coastal Carolina Chanticleers at Army Black Knights

Quarter	1	2	3	4	Total
Chanticleers	7	7	0	7	21
Black Knights	7	14	7	0	28

at Michie Stadium, West Point, NY

- Date: November 18, 2023
- Game time: 12:00 p.m. EST
- Game weather: Temperature: 49 °F (9 °C) • Wind: NW 13 mph • Weather: Sunny
- Game attendance: 26,867
- Referee: Jerry Magallanes
- TV announcers (CBSSN): Chris Lewis (play-by-play), Ross Tucker (analyst) & Tina Cervasio (sideline)
- ESPN – Coastal Carolina Chanticleers at Army Black Knights /// Box Score, Coastal Carolina at Army /// Army Pregame Notes /// Coastal Carolina Pregame Notes /// Postgame Notes

Game information

First quarter

- (06:52) ARMY TD – Tyson Riley 2-yard rush, Quinn Maretzki kick
  Drive: 13 plays, 75 yards, 8:08; Army 7–0
- (04:58) CCU TD – Jared Brown 59-yard pass from Jarrett Guest, Kade Hensley kick
  Drive: 4 plays, 75 yards, 1:54; Tied 7–7

Second quarter

- (10:19) ARMY TD – Bryson Daily 1-yard rush, Quinn Maretzki kick
  Drive: 15 plays, 75 yards, 9:39; Army 14–7
- (01:48) ARMY TD – Jabril Williams 37-yard blocked punt return, Quinn Maretzki kick
  Drive: 0 plays, 0 yards, 0:00; Army 21–7
- (00:58) CCU TD – Jameson Tucker 31-yard pass from Jarrett Guest, Kade Hensley kick
  Drive: 4 plays, 75 yards, 0:50; Army 21–14

Third quarter

- (11:14) ARMY TD – Ay'Jaun Marshall 18-yard rush, Quinn Maretzki kick
  Drive: 4 plays, 75 yards, 2:30; Army 28–14

Fourth quarter

- (00:51) CCU TD – Sam Pinckney 31-yard pass from Jarrett Guest, Kade Hensley kick
  Drive: 9 plays, 74 yards, 1:59; Army 28–21

Passing

- CCU – Jarrett Guest: 26/36, 279 yards, 3 TD, 1 INT
- ARMY – Champ Harris: 0/1, 0 yards, 1 INT

Rushing

- CCU – Jared Brown: 2 carries, 69 yards
- ARMY – Tyson Riley: 12 carries, 112 yards, 1 TD

Receiving

- CCU – Jared Brown: 8 receptions, 116 yards, 1 TD
- ARMY – No receptions

Defense

- CCU – JT Killen: 15 total tackles (5 solo, 10 assisted)
- ARMY – Leo Lowin: 7 total tackles (5 solo, 2 assisted)

Statistics	CCU	ARMY
First downs	18	22
3rd down efficiency	4–10	8–11
4th down efficiency	0–1	0–1
Plays–yards	51–384	64–365
Rushes–yards	15–105	62–365
Passing yards	279	0
Passing: Comp–Att–Int	26–36–1	0–2–1
Penalties–yards	6–45	5–55
Turnovers	1	2
Time of possession	20:09	39:51

=== vs. Navy ===
Army Black Knights vs. Navy Midshipmen (124th Army-Navy Game)

Quarter	1	2	3	4	Total
Black Knights	0	10	0	7	17
Midshipmen	0	0	0	11	11

at Gillette Stadium, Foxborough, MA

- Date: December 9, 2023
- Game time: 3:00 p.m. EST
- Game weather: Temperature: 51 °F (11 °C) • Wind: NW 6 mph • Weather: Cloudy
- Game attendance: 65,878
- Referee: Edwin Lee
- TV announcers (CBS): Brad Nessler (play-by-play), Gary Danielson (analyst) & Jenny Dell (sideline)
- ESPN – Army holds on with goal-line stand in final seconds, beats Navy 17–11 /// Box Score, Army vs. Navy /// Army Pregame Notes /// Navy Pregame Notes /// Postgame Notes

Game information

First Quarter

No scoring

Second Quarter

- (14:19) ARMY TD – Tyson Riley 4-yard pass from Bryson Daily, Quinn Maretzki kick
  Drive: 12 plays, 65 yards, 7:13; Army 7–0
- (00:00) ARMY FG – Quinn Maretzki 47-yard field goal
  Drive: 7 plays, 34 yards, 1:05; Army 10–0

Third Quarter

No scoring

Fourth Quarter

- (12:45) NAVY FG – Nathan Kirkwood 37-yard field goal
  Drive: 12 plays, 70 yards, 5:08; Army 10–3
- (04:49) ARMY TD – Kalib Fortner 44-yard fumble recovery, Quinn Maretzki kick
  Drive: 0 plays, 0 yards, 0:00; Army 17–3
- (02:47) NAVY TD – Jayden Umbarger 14-yard pass from Tai Lavatai, Tai Lavatai pass failed
  Drive: 7 plays, 59 yards, 2:02; Army 17–9
- (00:00) NAVY SF – Luke Pirris safety
  Drive: 0 plays, 0 yards, 0:00; Army 17–11

Passing

- ARMY – Bryson Daily: 7/14, 54 yards, 1 TD
- NAVY – Tai Lavatai: 16/26, 179 yards, 1 TD

Rushing

- ARMY – Kanye Udoh: 13 carries, 88 yards
- NAVY – Tai Lavatai: 19 carries, 74 yards

Receiving

- ARMY – Casey Reynolds: 3 receptions, 32 yards
- NAVY – Jayden Umbarger: 6 receptions, 75 yards, 1 TD

Defense

- ARMY – Kalib Fortner: 10 total tackles (5 solo, 5 assisted), 1 tackle for loss, 1 sack, 1 forced fumble, 1 fumble recovery (44 yards, TD)
- NAVY – Colin Ramos: 16 total tackles (5 solo, 11 assisted), 1 tackle for loss

Statistics	ARMY	NAVY
First downs	15	17
3rd down efficiency	5–14	4–14
4th down efficiency	1–2	1–3
Plays–yards	61–259	64–309
Rushes–yards	47–205	35–130
Passing yards	54	179
Passing: Comp–Att–Int	7–14–0	16–29–1
Penalties–yards	5–25	5–25
Turnovers	0	2
Time of possession	33:31	26:29

For this year's clash, Army was inspired by the 3rd Infantry Division, honoring the "Dogface Soldiers" and their 'legacy of excellence'. The Nike-designed uniforms features a color-rush tan desert motif for the infantry's role in the Iraq War. The division's famous mascot "Rocky the bulldog", a Walt Disney creation, appears on both sides of the helmet with a black stripe.
