= Greg Gasparato =

American football coach

Current position
- Title: Linebackers coach
- Team: Florida
- Conference: SEC

Playing career
- 2005–2008: Wofford
- Position: Safety

Coaching career (HC unless noted)
- 2010: Richland Northeast HS (SC) (S/ST)
- 2011: Juniata (DB)
- 2012: Brevard (OLB)
- 2013–2014: Appalachian State (DGA/LB)
- 2015–2017: Wofford (ILB/ST)
- 2018–2019: Appalachian State (S)
- 2020: Army (co-DC/S)
- 2021: Louisville (S)
- 2022: Louisville (OLB)
- 2023: Troy (DC)
- 2023: Troy (interim HC)
- 2024–2025: Tulane (DC/S)
- 2026–present: Florida (LB)

Head coaching record
- Overall: 0–1
- Bowls: 0–1

Greg Gasparato is an American college football coach. He is the linebackers coach for the Florida Gators. He previously served as the interim head coach of the Troy Trojans after previous head coach Jon Sumrall left prior to the team's bowl game.

== Coaching career ==
On December 8, 2023, after Jon Sumrall was announced to be the next head coach at Tulane University, Troy Athletic Director Brent Jones named Coach Gasparato as the interim head coach for the Troy Trojan's bowl game against Duke.

== Head coaching record ==
Year	Team	Overall	Conference	Standing	Bowl/playoffs
Troy Trojans (Sun Belt Conference) (2023)
2023	Troy	0–1	0–0	1st (West)	L Birmingham
Troy:		0–1	0–0		
Total:		0–1			
