= 2023 Troy Trojans football team =

American college football season

2023 Troy Trojans football

Sun Belt champion Sun Belt West Division champion

Sun Belt Championship, W 49–23 vs. Appalachian State

Birmingham Bowl, L 10–17 vs. Duke
- Conference: Sun Belt Conference
- West Division
- Record: 11–3 (7–1 Sun Belt)
- Head coach: Jon Sumrall (2nd season); Greg Gasparato (interim, bowl game)
- Offensive coordinator: Joe Craddock (2nd season)
- Offensive scheme: Spread
- Defensive coordinator: Greg Gasparato (1st season)
- Base defense: Multiple 4–2–5
- Home stadium: Veterans Memorial Stadium

2023 Sun Belt Conference football standings
	Conf.			Overall
Team	W		L	W		L
East Division
James Madison* x	7	–	1	11	–	2
Appalachian State y	6	–	2	9	–	5
Coastal Carolina	5	–	3	8	–	5
Old Dominion	5	–	3	6	–	7
Georgia State	3	–	5	7	–	6
Marshall	3	–	5	6	–	7
Georgia Southern	3	–	5	6	–	7
West Division
Troy xy$	7	–	1	11	–	3
Texas State	4	–	4	8	–	5
Arkansas State	4	–	4	6	–	7
South Alabama	4	–	4	7	–	6
Louisiana	3	–	5	6	–	7
Southern Miss	2	–	6	3	–	9
Louisiana–Monroe	0	–	8	2	–	10
Championship: Troy 49, Appalachian State 23
$ – Conference champion; x – Division champion/co-champions; y – Championship game participant; * – Ineligible for postseason play due to FCS-to-FBS transition rules

The 2023 Troy Trojans football team represented Troy University as a member of the West Division of the Sun Belt Conference during the 2023 NCAA Division I FBS football season. Led by second-year head coach Jon Sumrall, the Trojans played home games at Veterans Memorial Stadium in Troy, Alabama.

== Preseason ==
=== Media poll ===
In the Sun Belt preseason coaches' poll, the Trojans were picked to finish in first place in the West division.

Defensive linemen TJ Jackson and Richard Jibunor and defensive back Reddy Steward were named to the preseason All-Sun Belt first team. Running back Kimani Vidal, offensive lineman Daniel King, defensive lineman Javon Solomon, defensive back Dell Pettus, and all purpose back Kimani Vidal were named to the second team.

== Schedule ==
The football schedule was announced February 24, 2023.

Date	Time	Opponent	Site	TV	Result	Attendance
September 2	6:00 p.m.	Stephen F. Austin*	Veterans Memorial Stadium; Troy, AL	ESPN+	W 48–30	28,179
September 9	11:00 a.m.	at No. 15 Kansas State*	Bill Snyder Family Football Stadium; Manhattan, Kansas	FS1	L 13–42	51,940
September 16	6:00 p.m.	James Madison	Veterans Memorial Stadium; Troy, AL	NFLN	L 14–16	26,634
September 23	11:00 a.m.	Western Kentucky*	Veterans Memorial Stadium; Troy, AL	ESPNU	W 27–24	26,124
September 30	6:00 p.m.	at Georgia State	Center Parc Stadium; Atlanta, GA	ESPN+	W 28–7	16,536
October 7	3:00 p.m.	Arkansas State^{†}	Veterans Memorial Stadium; Troy, AL	ESPN+	W 37–3	26,957
October 14	2:30 p.m.	at Army*	Michie Stadium; West Point, NY	CBSSN	W 19–0	27,829
October 28	2:00 p.m.	at Texas State	Bobcat Stadium; San Marcos, TX	ESPN+	W 31–13	22,369
November 2	6:30 p.m.	South Alabama	Veterans Memorial Stadium; Troy, AL (Battle for the Belt)	ESPN2	W 28–10	28,212
November 11	1:00 p.m.	at Louisiana–Monroe	Malone Stadium; Monroe, LA	ESPN+	W 45–14	7,683
November 18	6:00 p.m.	Louisiana	Veterans Memorial Stadium; Troy, AL	NFLN	W 31–24	26,621
November 25	11:00 a.m.	at Southern Miss	M. M. Roberts Stadium; Hattiesburg, MS	ESPNU	W 35–17	19,766
December 2	3:00 p.m.	Appalachian State	Veterans Memorial Stadium; Troy, AL (Sun Belt Championship Game)	ESPN	W 49–23	20,183
December 23	11:00 a.m.	vs. Duke	Protective Stadium; Birmingham, AL (Birmingham Bowl)	ABC	L 10–17	20,023
*Non-conference game; ^{†}Homecoming; Rankings from AP Poll and CFP Rankings released prior to game; All times are in Central time

== Personnel ==
2023 Troy Trojans football team roster
Players
Coaches
Offense

Pos.	#	Name	Class
WR	1	Jabre Barber	Jr
TE	2	Deyunkrea Lewis	Jr
WR	4	Marcus Rogers	Sr
WR	6	Chris Lewis	So
WR	7	Devonte Ross	So
QB	9	Goose Crowder	So
QB	10	Tucker Kilcrease	Fr
WR	11	Deshon Stoudemire	Sr
WR	12	MJ Johnson	Fr
QB	13	JD Sherrod	Fr
TE	14	Ethan Conner	Jr
RB	15	Jordon Ingram	So
RB	15	Jordan Lovett	Fr
WR	16	Peyton Higgins	So
QB	17	Jameson Holcomb	Fr
QB	18	Gunnar Watson	Sr
RB	20	Asa Martin	Sr
RB	21	Jarris Williams	So
RB	22	Tae Meadows	Fr
WR	23	Landon Parker	Jr
RB	24	Damien Taylor	So
WR	25	Robert Marsh	So
RB	26	DeWhitt Betterson Jr.	Fr
WR	27	TJ Booker	Fr
RB	28	Kimani Vidal	Jr
RB	29	Cameron Torres	Fr
RB	38	Christian Nunnery	Fr
TE	44	Alex Cash	Fr
FB	49	Tyce Khatri	Fr
OL	50	Boaz Stanley	So
OL	52	Elijah Philippe	Jr
OL	55	Tavon Matthews	Sr
OL	57	Noah Mercer	Fr
OL	58	Elijah Prather	Fr
OL	59	Derrick Keith	Fr
OL	62	Billy Gilmore	Fr
OL	63	Carson Burt	Jr
OL	65	Tyler Cappi	Fr
OL	66	Eli Russ	So
OL	67	Grant Betts	Sr
OL	69	Colby Smith	So
OL	71	Kyler Gibson	Fr
OL	72	Obatare Jackson	Fr
OL	73	Tyler Bell	Fr
OL	74	Daniel King	Jr
OL	75	Kobe Williams	So
OL	77	Derrick Graham	So
OL	78	Jeremiah Frazier	So
OL	79	Blake Austin	Jr
WR	80	Luke Harkless	Fr
WR	81	Robert Bruce	So
WR	82	Jackson Thomas	Fr
WR	83	DJ Epps	Fr
WR	84	Caleb Chappelle	So
TE	86	Jackson Worley	Fr
TE	88	Brody Dalton	So
TE	89	Clayton Ollendieck	Sr

Defense

Pos.	#	Name	Class
DT	0	Jamarcus Chatman	Sr
S	1	Dell Pettus	Sr
CB	2	Reddy Steward	Sr
S	3	Keyshawn Swanson	Jr
DT	4	Buddha Jones	Sr
CB	5	Don Callis	Sr
DE	6	Javon Solomon	Jr
S	7	Reggie Bracy	Jr
S	8	Irshaad Davis	Sr
BAN	9	Richard Jibunor	Sr
LB	10	Jayden McDonald	Sr
CB	11	O'Shai Fletcher	Sr
LB	12	Terry Thomas	So
LB	13	TJ Thompson	So
SPR	14	Caleb Ransaw	Jr
DE	15	Zach Edwards	Jr
S	16	Dasheen Jackson	Jr
S	17	Carloss Crawford	Sr
CB	18	Damaje Yancey	Jr
SPR	19	Darrell Starling	So
LB	20	Keyshawn Campbell	Fr
CB	21	LJ Green	Fr
LB	22	Steven Cattledge	Jr
SPR	23	Chris Rodgers	Fr
S	24	LaBarryon Moore	Fr
S	25	Justin Powe	Fr
S	26	Dorion Jackson	Fr
S	27	John Butler	So
CB	28	Tim Roberson	Fr
S	29	Jack Tchienchou	Fr
CB	30	AJ Swanson	Fr
DE	31	Raymond Cutts	Jr
BAN	32	Phillip Lee	So
SPR	33	Rondell Cole	Sr
CB	34	Tavares Williams Jr.	Fr
BAN	35	Malaki Pegues	Fr
CB	36	Tyre Young	Fr
S	37	KC Bradford	Fr
CB	38	Tye Pouncey	Jr
BAN	39	Riley Slaughter	Fr
LB	42	Blake Matthews	Fr
LB	43	AZ Williams	So
LB	44	Jordan Stringer	So
LB	45	Luke Hodge	Fr
CB	46	Nic Floyd	Fr
BAN	47	Anthony Butler	Jr
DT	51	Jackson Stein	So
DE	52	Noah Wright	So
BAN	85	Eric Shaw	So
DE	90	Ty'Quarius Perry	Fr
DE	91	Deshaun Batiste	Fr
DT	92	Julian Peterson	So
DT	93	Jaden Palms	So
DT	95	Luis Medina	So
DT	96	Kenny Reedy	Fr
DT	97	AJ Pierce	Sr
DE	98	T. J. Jackson	Jr
DE	99	Fabian Rogosch	Fr

Special teams

Pos.	#	Name	Class
K	30	Nick Troemel	Fr
K	36	Gage Theus	So
K	40	Scott Taylor Renfroe	So
LS	41	Will Spain	So
P	43	Elliot Janish	Jr
K	46	Zach Long	So
P	48	Robert Cole	Jr
LS	53	Quentin Skinner	Sr
LS	87	Colton Wals	Fr

Head coach

- Jon Sumrall (Kentucky)

Coordinators/assistant coaches

- Greg Gasparato (Wofford)
  Defensive coordinator/S
- Joe Craddock (Middle Tennessee)
  Offensive coordinator/QB
- Taylor Polk (Mississippi)
  Co-defensive coordinator/ILB
- Gary Banks (Troy)
  Wide receivers
- Joe Bernardi (Fresno State)
  Offensive linemen
- Bam Hardmon (Illinois)
  Defensive run game coordinator/OLB
- Brock Hays (Grambling State)
  Running backs
- Eric McDaniel (Purdue)
  Defensive linemen
- Evan McKissack (Troy)
  Tight ends/director of offensive recruiting
- Travis Pearson (Alabama State)
  Cornerbacks
- Rusty Whitt (Abilene Christian)
  Strength & conditioning coach

Legend

- (C) Team captain
- (S) Suspended
- (I) Ineligible
- Injured
- Redshirt

Roster
Last update: 18 January 2025
