= 2023 Sun Belt Conference Football Championship Game =

2023 Hercules Tires Sun Belt Conference Football Championship Game
- 5th SBC Championship Game
Appalachian State Mountaineers	Troy Trojans
(8–4)	(10–2)
23	49
Head coach: Shawn Clark	Head coach: Jon Sumrall
	1	2	3	4	Total
Appalachian State	0	7	10	6	23
Troy	0	14	7	28	49
- Date: December 2, 2023
- Season: 2023
- Stadium: Veterans Memorial Stadium
- Location: Troy, Alabama
- MVP: RB Kimani Vidal, Troy
- Favorite: Troy by 5.5
- Referee: Wayne Winkler
- Attendance: 20,183

United States TV coverage
- Network: ESPN
- Announcers: John Schriffen, Kirk Morrison and Stormy Buonantony

2023 Sun Belt Conference football standings
	Conf.			Overall
Team	W		L	W		L
East Division
James Madison* x	7	–	1	11	–	2
Appalachian State y	6	–	2	9	–	5
Coastal Carolina	5	–	3	8	–	5
Old Dominion	5	–	3	6	–	7
Georgia State	3	–	5	7	–	6
Marshall	3	–	5	6	–	7
Georgia Southern	3	–	5	6	–	7
West Division
Troy xy$	7	–	1	11	–	3
Texas State	4	–	4	8	–	5
Arkansas State	4	–	4	6	–	7
South Alabama	4	–	4	7	–	6
Louisiana	3	–	5	6	–	7
Southern Miss	2	–	6	3	–	9
Louisiana–Monroe	0	–	8	2	–	10
Championship: Troy 49, Appalachian State 23
$ – Conference champion; x – Division champion/co-champions; y – Championship game participant; * – Ineligible for postseason play due to FCS-to-FBS transition rules

The 2023 Sun Belt Conference Football Championship Game was a college football game that was played on December 2, 2023 at Veterans Memorial Stadium on the campus of Troy University in Troy, Alabama. It was the fifth edition of the Sun Belt Conference Football Championship Game and determined the champion of the Sun Belt Conference for the 2023 season. The game began at 4:00 p.m. EST on ESPN. The game featured the Troy Trojans, the West Division champions, and the Appalachian State Mountaineers, the East Division runner-up. Troy defeated App State 49–23. Sponsored by Hercules Tires, the game was officially named as the 2023 Hercules Tires Sun Belt Football Championship.

== Teams ==
=== Troy Trojans ===
Troy clinched a spot in the championship game following its defeat of ULM on November 11. Troy secured hosting rights with its win over Southern Miss on November 25. Troy running back Kimani Vidal secured the championship game MVP award after becoming the first player ever to rush for 5 touchdowns in an FBS conference championship game.

=== Appalachian State Mountaineers ===
With the NCAA having denied a request by James Madison for a waiver from rules that prohibit teams transitioning from Division I FCS to FBS from appearing in conference championship games, the Trojans' opponent in the championship game was determined to be Appalachian State. App State secured the East Division spot after beating Georgia Southern and having James Madison defeat Coastal Carolina in the final week of college football regular season.

== Game summary ==
2023 Hercules Tires Sun Belt Football Championship
Appalachian State Mountaineers (8–4, 6–2) vs. Troy Trojans (10-2, 7–1)

Quarter	1	2	3	4	Total
Appalachian State	0	7	10	6	23
Troy	0	14	7	28	49

at Veterans Memorial Stadium • Troy, AL

- Date: Saturday, December 2, 2023
- Game time: 4:00 p.m. EST
- TV announcers (ESPN): John Schriffen, Kirk Morrison, Stormy Buonantony

Game information

First Quarter

No scoring

Second Quarter

- (5:33) TROY – Kimani Vidal 7 yard rush, Scott Taylor Renfroe kick (Drive: 8 plays, 61 yards, 3:45; Troy 7–0)
- (3:15) TROY – Kimani Vidal 36 yard rush, Scott Taylor Renfroe kick (Drive: 4 plays, 55 yards, 1:18; Troy 14–0)
- (0:39) APPST – Kanye Roberts 1 yard rush, Michael Hughes kick (Drive: 9 plays, 75 yards, 2:36; Troy 14–7)

Third Quarter

- (10:11) APPST – Kanye Roberts 6 yard rush, Michael Hughes kick (Drive: 11 plays, 82 yards, 4:49; Tied 14–14)
- (8:31) TROY – Chris Lewis 51 yard pass from Gunnar Watson, Scott Taylor Renfroe kick (Drive: 4 plays, 75 yards, 1:40; Troy 21–14)
- (3:50) APPST – Michael Hughes 41 yard field goal (Drive: 7 plays, 0 yards, 2:56; Troy 21–17)

Fourth Quarter

- (10:57) TROY – Kimani Vidal 2 yard rush, Scott Taylor Renfroe kick (Drive: 10 plays, 81 yards, 3:57; TROY 28–17)
- (10:51) TROY – Don Callis 10 yard fumble return, Scott Taylor Renfroe kick (Troy 35–17)
- (5:34) APPST – Eli Watson fumble recovery in end zone, two-point rush conversion failed (Drive: 10 plays, 75 yards, 5:17; Troy 35–23)
- (4:30) TROY – Kimani Vidal 6 yard rush, Scott Taylor Renfroe kick (Drive: 4 plays, 38 yards, 1:04; Troy 42–23)
- (2:42) TROY – Kimani Vidal 49 yard rush, Scott Taylor Renfroe kick (Drive: 2 plays, 49 yards, 0:56; TROY 49–23)

Statistics	ASU	TROY
First downs	22	25
Plays–yards	80–383	60–463
Rushes–yards	41–108	35–271
Passing yards	275	192
Passing: comp–att–int	28–39–0	16–25–0
Time of possession	35:29	24:31

Team	Category	Player	Statistics
Appalachian State	Passing	Joey Aguilar	28/39, 275 yards
Appalachian State	Rushing	Kanye Roberts	13 carries, 53 yards, 2 TD
Appalachian State	Receiving	Kaedin Robinson	6 receptions, 70 yards
Troy	Passing	Gunnar Watson	16/24, 192 yards, TD
Troy	Rushing	Kimani Vidal	26 carries, 233 yards, 5 TD
Troy	Receiving	Chris Lewis	3 receptions, 98 yards, TD
