= 2023 Louisiana–Monroe Warhawks football team =

American college football season

2023 Louisiana–Monroe Warhawks football
- Conference: Sun Belt Conference
- West Division
- Record: 2–10 (0–8 Sun Belt)
- Head coach: Terry Bowden (3rd season)
- Offensive coordinator: Matt Kubik (6th season)
- Offensive scheme: Spread option
- Defensive coordinator: Vic Koenning (2nd season)
- Base defense: Multiple 3–3–5
- Home stadium: Malone Stadium

2023 Sun Belt Conference football standings
	Conf.			Overall
Team	W		L	W		L
East Division
James Madison* x	7	–	1	11	–	2
Appalachian State y	6	–	2	9	–	5
Coastal Carolina	5	–	3	8	–	5
Old Dominion	5	–	3	6	–	7
Georgia State	3	–	5	7	–	6
Marshall	3	–	5	6	–	7
Georgia Southern	3	–	5	6	–	7
West Division
Troy xy$	7	–	1	11	–	3
Texas State	4	–	4	8	–	5
Arkansas State	4	–	4	6	–	7
South Alabama	4	–	4	7	–	6
Louisiana	3	–	5	6	–	7
Southern Miss	2	–	6	3	–	9
Louisiana–Monroe	0	–	8	2	–	10
Championship: Troy 49, Appalachian State 23
$ – Conference champion; x – Division champion/co-champions; y – Championship game participant; * – Ineligible for postseason play due to FCS-to-FBS transition rules

The 2023 Louisiana–Monroe Warhawks football team represented the University of Louisiana at Monroe as a member of the West Division of the Sun Belt Conference during the 2023 NCAA Division I FBS football season. Led by third-year head coach Terry Bowden, Louisiana–Monroe played their home games at Malone Stadium in Monroe, Louisiana.

== Preseason ==
=== Media poll ===
In the Sun Belt preseason coaches' poll, the Warhawks were picked to finish in last place in the West Division.

Wide receiver Tyrone Howell was named to the second team.

== Schedule ==
The football schedule was announced February 24, 2023.

Date	Time	Opponent	Site	TV	Result	Attendance
September 2	6:00 p.m.	Army*	Malone Stadium; Monroe, LA	NFLN	W 17–13	18,914
September 9	7:00 p.m.	Lamar*	Malone Stadium; Monroe, LA	ESPN+	W 24–14	13,154
September 16	3:00 p.m.	at Texas A&M*	Kyle Field; College Station, TX	SECN	L 3–47	102,733
September 30	7:00 p.m.	Appalachian State	Malone Stadium; Monroe, LA	ESPN+	L 40–41	19,919
October 7	6:00 p.m.	South Alabama	Malone Stadium; Monroe, LA	ESPN+	L 7–55	12,099
October 14	6:00 p.m.	at Texas State	Bobcat Stadium; San Marcos, TX	ESPN+	L 20–21	27,537
October 21	1:00 p.m.	at Georgia Southern	Paulson Stadium; Statesboro, GA	ESPN+	L 28–38	21,068
October 28	4:00 p.m.	Arkansas State^{†}	Malone Stadium; Monroe, LA	ESPN+	L 24–34	14,006
November 4	3:00 p.m.	at Southern Miss	M. M. Roberts Stadium; Hattiesburg, MS	ESPN+	L 7–24	20,193
November 11	1:00 p.m.	Troy	Malone Stadium; Monroe, LA	ESPN+	L 14–45	7,683
November 18	11:00 a.m.	at No. 13 Ole Miss*	Vaught-Hemingway Stadium; Oxford, MS	SECN	L 3–35	60,752
November 25	2:00 p.m.	at Louisiana	Cajun Field; Lafayette, LA (Battle on the Bayou)	ESPN+	L 21–52	13,892
*Non-conference game; ^{†}Homecoming; Rankings from AP Poll and CFP Rankings released prior to game; All times are in Central time

== Game summaries ==
=== Army ===
Army Black Knights (0–0) at Louisiana–Monroe Warhawks (0–0)

Quarter	1	2	3	4	Total
Black Knights	0	10	0	3	13
Warhawks	0	3	0	14	17

at Malone Stadium, Monroe, Louisiana

- Date: September 2, 2023
- Game time: 6:00 p.m. CDT
- Game weather: Temperature: 97 °F (36 °C) • Wind: NE 9 mph • Weather: Sunny
- Game attendance: 18,914
- Referee: Wayne Winkler
- TV announcers (NFLN): Doug Sherman (play-by-play) & Tyoka Jackson (analyst)

Game information

First quarter

No scoring

Second quarter

- (06:20) ULM FG – Derek McCormick 24-yard field goal
  Drive: 8 plays, 38 yards, 2:44; Louisiana–Monroe 3–0
- (02:38) ARMY TD – Bo Nicolas-Paul 44-yard interception return, Quinn Maretzki kick
  Drive: 0 plays, 0 yards, 0:00; Army 7–3
- (00:07) ARMY FG – Quinn Maretzki 22-yard field goal
  Drive: 6 plays, 15 yards, 1:21; Army 10–3

Third quarter

No scoring

Fourth quarter

- (12:53) ARMY FG – Quinn Maretzki 28-yard field goal
  Drive: 9 plays, 58 yards, 5:13; Army 13–3
- (05:43) ULM TD – Hunter Smith 62-yard rush, Derek McCormick kick
  Drive: 1 play, 62 yards, 0:11; Army 13–10
- (02:48) ULM TD – Tyrone Howell 9-yard pass from Hunter Herring, Derek McCormick kick
  Drive: 4 plays, 45 yards, 2:00; Louisiana–Monroe 17–13

Statistics	ARMY	ULM
First downs	13	16
3rd down efficiency	6–15	4–15
4th down efficiency	0–0	1–1
Plays–yards	62–279	63–298
Rushes–yards	50–172	32–207
Passing yards	107	91
Passing: Comp–Att–Int	6–12–2	15–31–2
Penalties–yards	3–35	5–35
Turnovers	5	2
Time of possession	33:38	26:22

Team	Category	Player	Statistics
Army	Passing	Bryson Daily	5/11, 121 yards, 2 INT
Army	Rushing	Bryson Daily	23 carries, 63 yards
Army	Receiving	Liam Fortner	1 reception, 53 yards
Louisiana–Monroe	Passing	Jiya Wright	11/22, 69 yards, 2 INT
Louisiana–Monroe	Rushing	Hunter Smith	7 carries, 103 yards, TD
Louisiana–Monroe	Receiving	Tyrone Howell	9 receptions, 67 yards, TD

=== Lamar ===
Lamar Cardinals (0–1) at Louisiana–Monroe Warhawks (1–0)

Quarter	1	2	3	4	Total
Cardinals	0	0	0	14	14
Warhawks	7	14	0	3	24

at Malone Stadium, Monroe, Louisiana

- Date: September 9, 2023
- Game time: 7:00 p.m. CDT
- Game weather: Clear • Temperature: 86 °F (30 °C) • Wind: N 8 mph
- Game attendance: 13,154
- Referee: Bruce Austin
- TV: ESPN+

Game information

First Quarter

- (0:43) ULM – Hunter Smith 27-yard run, Derek McCormick kick (Drive: 9 plays, 60 yards, 2:42; Louisiana–Monroe 7–0)

Second Quarter

- (5:36) ULM – Tristan Driggers 0-yard punt return, Derek McCormick kick (Drive: Louisiana–Monroe 14–0)
- (2:17) ULM – Thad Franklin Jr. 1-yard run, Derek McCormick kick (Drive: 6 plays, 63 yards, 2:34; Louisiana–Monroe 21–0)

Third Quarter

None

Fourth Quarter

- (12:37) LAM – Major Bowden 19-yard pass from Robert Coleman, Chris Esqueda kick (Drive: 12 plays, 72 yards, 6:12; Louisiana–Monroe 21–7)
- (8:16) LAM – Izaha Jones 47-yard run, Chris Esqueda kick (Drive: 4 plays, 63 yards, 2:06; Louisiana–Monroe 21–14)
- (3:35) ULM – Derek McCormick 30-yard field goal (Drive: 9 plays, 59 yards, 4:33; Louisiana–Monroe 24–14)

Win Probability

Line

Over/Under

Statistics	LAM	ULM
First downs	17	19
Total yards	311	384
Rushing yards	121	285
Passing yards	190	99
Turnovers	2	0
Time of possession	33:58	26:02

Team	Category	Player	Statistics
Lamar	Passing	Robert Coleman	19/25, 190 yards, TD, INT
Lamar	Rushing	Izaha Jones	1 carry, 47 yards, TD
Lamar	Receiving	Kyndon Fuselier	5 receptions, 59 yards
Louisiana–Monroe	Passing	Hunter Herring	12/21, 99 yards
Louisiana–Monroe	Rushing	Isaiah Woullard	14 carries, 113 yards
Louisiana–Monroe	Receiving	Tyrone Howell	4 receptions, 65 yards

=== at Texas A&M ===
Louisiana–Monroe Warhawks (2–1) at Texas A&M Aggies (1–1) – Game summary

Quarter	1	2	3	4	Total
Louisiana-Monroe	0	3	0	0	3
Texas A&M	10	17	10	10	47

at Kyle Field, College Station, Texas

- Date: Saturday, September 16, 2023
- Game time: 3:00 p.m. CDT
- Game weather: Sunny, 76 °F (24 °C)
- Game attendance: 93,090
- Referee: Steve Marlowe
- TV announcers (SECN): Dave Neal, Derek Mason, and Taylor Davis
- Box score, Recap

Game information
First quarter
- (8:30) TXAM – Randy Bond 30-yard field goal (Drive: 11 plays, 65 yards, 5:00; Texas A&M 3-0)
- (2:26) TXAM – Jahdae Walker 12-yard pass from Conner Weigman (Randy Bond kick) (Drive: 8 plays, 90 yards, 3:38; Texas A&M 10-0)

Second quarter

- (13:19) ULM – Derek McCormick 24-yard field goal (Drive: 9 plays, 69 yards, 4:07; Texas A&M 10-3)
- (9:37) TXAM – Conner Weigman 19-yard run (Randy Bond kick) (Drive: 8 plays, 74 yards, 3:32; Texas A&M 17-3)
- (4:04) TXAM – Randy Bond 23-yard field goal (Drive: 9 plays, 67 yards, 3:28; Texas A&M 20-3)
- (0:48) TXAM – Amari Daniels 4-yard run (Randy Bond kick) (Drive: 6 plays, 63 yards, 1:12; Texas A&M 27-3)

Third quarter

- (11:00) TXAM – Randy Bond 34-yard field goal (Drive: 8 plays, 32 yards, 3:54; Texas A&M 30-3)
- (5:54) TXAM – Rueben Owens 21-yard run (Randy Bond kick) (Drive: 7 plays, 60 yards, 3:31; Texas A&M 37-3)

Fourth quarter

- (11:15) TXAM – Raymond Cottrell 13-yard pass from Max Johnson (Randy Bond kick) (Drive: 7 plays, 41 yards, 2:54; Texas A&M 44-3)
- (7:11) TXAM – Randy Bond 52-yard field goal (Drive: 6 plays, 19 yards, 2:34; Texas A&M 47-3)

Statistics	ULM	TXAM
First downs	8	28
Total yards	82–433	54–451
Rushing yards	31–127	33–158
Passing yards	95	399
Passing: Comp–Att–Int	6–17–0	32–40–0
Time of possession	25:31	34:29

Team	Category	Player	Statistics
Louisiana–Monroe	Passing	Jiya Wright	6/15, 95 yards
Louisiana–Monroe	Rushing	Jiya Wright	5 carries, 34 yards
Louisiana–Monroe	Receiving	Dariyan Wiley	3 receptions, 52 yards
Texas A&M	Passing	Conner Weigman	25/29, 337 yards, TD
Texas A&M	Rushing	Rueben Owens	8 carries, 51 yards, TD
Texas A&M	Receiving	Ainias Smith	7 receptions, 127 yards

=== Appalachian State ===
Appalachian State Mountaineers (3–2) at Louisiana–Monroe Warhawks (2–2)

Quarter	1	2	3	4	Total
Mountaineers	14	14	7	6	41
Warhawks	14	14	12	3	43

at Malone Stadium, Monroe, Louisiana

- Date: September 30, 2023
- Game time: 7:00 p.m. CDT
- TV: ESPN+

Game information

First Quarter
Second Quarter
Third Quarter
Fourth Quarter

Win Probability

Line

Over/Under

Statistics	APP	ULM
First downs		
Total yards		
Rushing yards		
Passing yards		
Turnovers		
Time of possession		

Team	Category	Player	Statistics
Appalachian State	Passing		
Appalachian State	Rushing		
Appalachian State	Receiving		
Louisiana–Monroe	Passing		
Louisiana–Monroe	Rushing		
Louisiana–Monroe	Receiving		

=== South Alabama ===
South Alabama Jaguars (2–3) at Louisiana–Monroe Warhawks (2–2)

Quarter	1	2	3	4	Total
Jaguars	14	17	14	10	55
Warhawks	0	7	0	0	7

at Malone Stadium, Monroe, Louisiana

- Date: October 7, 2023
- Game time: 6:00 p.m. CDT
- Game weather: Clear • Temperature: 70 °F (21 °C) • Wind: N 12 mph
- Game attendance: 12,099
- Referee: Scott Broadway
- TV announcers (ESPN+): Chris Harris (play-by-play) and Tag Rome (analyst)

Game information

First Quarter

- (10:57) USA – Kentrel Bullock 5-yard run, Diego Guajardo kick (Drive: 10 plays, 75 yards, 4:03; South Alabama 7–0)
- (6:29) USA – Brandon Crum 3-yard pass from Carter Bradley, Diego Guajardo kick (Drive: 8 plays, 45 yards, 3:44; South Alabama 14–0)

Second Quarter

- (13:55) USA – Diego Guajardo 37-yard field goal (Drive: 15 plays, 38 yards, 6:29; South Alabama 17–0)
- (9:57) USA – Caullin Lacy 44-yard pass from Carter Bradley, Diego Guajardo kick (Drive: 2 plays, 46 yards, 0:38; South Alabama 24–0)
- (1:23) USA – Marco Lee Jr. 10-yard run, Diego Guajardo kick (Drive: 7 plays, 76 yards, 3:32; South Alabama 31–0)
- (0:00) ULM – Tyrone Howell 14-yard pass from Jiya Wright, Derek McCormick kick (Drive: 11 plays, 75 yards, 1:23; South Alabama 31–7)

Third Quarter

- (4:46) USA – La'Damian Webb 1-yard run, Diego Guajardo kick (Drive: 8 plays, 58 yards, 2:51; South Alabama 38–7)
- (1:23) USA – Kentrel Bullock 30-yard pass from Carter Bradley, Diego Guajardo kick (Drive: 6 plays, 68 yards, 2:10; South Alabama 45–7)

Fourth Quarter

- (10:33) USA – Diego Guajardo 46-yard field goal (Drive: 7 plays, 31 yards, 3:11; South Alabama 48–7)
- (1:20) USA – Jeremiah Webb 3-yard pass from Gio Lopez, Diego Guajardo kick (Drive: 13 plays, 80 yards, 5:56; South Alabama 55–7)

Win Probability

Line

Over/Under

Statistics	USA	ULM
First downs	32	13
Total yards	589	250
Rushing yards	14	5
Passing yards	18	6
Passing: Comp–Att–Int	27–39–0	13–28–2
Time of possession	36:30	23:30

Team	Category	Player	Statistics
South Alabama	Passing	Carter Bradley	20/29, 303 yards, 3 TD
South Alabama	Rushing	La'Damian Webb	19 carries, 100 yards, TD
South Alabama	Receiving	Caullin Lacy	7 receptions, 156 yards, TD
Louisiana–Monroe	Passing	Jiya Wright	13/28, 112 yards, TD, 2 INT
Louisiana–Monroe	Rushing	Jiya Wright	13 carries, 53 yards
Louisiana–Monroe	Receiving	Tyrone Howell	4 receptions, 41 yards

=== at Texas State ===
Louisiana–Monroe Warhawks (2–3) at Texas State Bobcats (4–2) – Game summary

Quarter	1	2	3	4	Total
Warhawks	7	0	3	10	20
Bobcats	3	6	0	12	21

at Bobcat Stadium, San Marcos, Texas

- Date: October 14
- Game time: 6:00 p.m.
- Game weather: Sunny, 77 °F (25 °C)
- Game attendance: 27,537
- Referee: Wayne Winkler
- TV announcers (ESPN+): Brant Freeman, Keith Moreland, and Koral Riggs
- Box score, Recap

Game information
First quarter
- TXST – Mason Shipley 29-yard field goal, 8:56. Bobcats 3–0. Drive: 17 plays, 69 yards, 6:04.
- ULM – Isaiah Woullard 10-yard pass from Jiya Wright (Derek McCormick kick), 3:24. Warhawks 7–3. Drive: 8 plays, 52 yards, 2:54.

Second quarter

- TXST – Mason Shipley 34-yard field goal, 14:09. Warhawks 7–6. Drive: 13 plays, 58 yards, 4:15.
- TXST – Mason Shipley 47-yard field goal, 7:06. Bobcats 9–7. Drive: 11 plays, 58 yards, 3:30.

Third quarter

- ULM – Derek McCormick 47-yard field goal, 8:24. Warhawks 10–9. Drive: 4 plays, 3 yards, 1:36.

Fourth quarter

- ULM – Derek McCormick 22-yard field goal, 14:58. Warhawks 13–9. Drive: 9 plays, 47 yards, 4:29.
- ULM – Ja'Terious Evans 76-yard interception return (Derek McCormick kick), 8:57. Warhawks 20–9.
- TXST – Joey Hobert 11-yard pass from T. J. Finley (pass failed), 4:16. Warhawks 20–15. Drive: 13 plays, 75 yards, 4:41.
- TXST – Joey Hobert 22-yard pass T. J. Finley (pass failed), 0:41. Bobcats 21–20. Drive: 11 plays, 76 yards, 2:34.

Statistics

Statistics	ULM	TXST
First downs	14	29
Total yards	285	452
Rushing yards	135	230
Passing yards	150	222
Turnovers	0	1
Time of possession	22:42	37:18

Team	Category	Player	Statistics
Louisiana–Monroe	Passing	Jiya Wright	14/22, 150 yards, TD
Louisiana–Monroe	Rushing	Isaiah Woullard	14 rushes, 55 yards
Louisiana–Monroe	Receiving	Nolan Quinlan	3 receptions, 52 yards
Texas State	Passing	T. J. Finley	24/46, 222 yards, 2 TD, INT
Texas State	Rushing	Donerio Davenport	15 rushes, 94 yards
Texas State	Receiving	Joey Hobert	10 receptions, 110 yards, 2 TD

=== at Southern Miss ===
Game Nine – Louisiana–Monroe Warhawks (2–6) at Southern Miss Golden Eagles (1–7) – Game summary

Quarter	1	2	3	4	Total
Warhawks	0	0	0	0	0
Golden Eagles	0	0	0	0	0

at M. M. Roberts Stadium, Hattiesburg, MS

- Date: Saturday, November 4, 2023
- Game time: 3:00 p.m. CDT
- Game weather: -
- Game attendance: 20,193
- Referee: -
- TV announcers (ESPN+): TBD

Game information

First quarter

Second quarter

Third quarter

Fourth quarter

Statistics	ULM	USM
First downs		
Total yards		
Rushing yards		
Passing yards		
Passing: Comp–Att–Int		
Time of possession		

Team	Category	Player	Statistics
Louisiana–Monroe	Passing		
Louisiana–Monroe	Rushing		
Louisiana–Monroe	Receiving		
Southern Miss	Passing		
Southern Miss	Rushing		
Southern Miss	Receiving		

=== at No. 13 Ole Miss ===
Louisiana–Monroe Warhawks (2–8) at No. 13 Ole Miss Rebels (8–2)

Quarter	1	2	3	4	Total
Warhawks	0	3	0	0	3
No. 13 Rebels	7	0	21	7	35

at Vaught-Hemingway Stadium • Oxford, MS

- Date: Saturday, November 18, 2023
- Game time: 11:00 a.m. CST
- Game weather: Sunny • Temperature: 58 °F (14 °C)
- Game attendance: 60,752
- Referee: Matt Loeffler
- TV announcers (SECN): Taylor Zarzour (play-by-play), Matt Stinchcomb (analyst), Alyssa Lang (sideline)

Game information

First Quarter

- (4:26) Ole Miss – Ulysses Bentley IV 14 Yd Run (Caden Davis Kick)
  Ole Miss 7–0; 10 plays, 85 yards, 2:59

Second Quarter

- (0:00) Louisiana–Monroe – Braxton Guilbeau 26 Yd Field Goal
  Ole Miss 7–3; 17 plays, 71 yards, 6:25

Third Quarter

- (9:44) Ole Miss – Tre Harris 13 Yd pass from Jaxson Dart (Caden Davis Kick)
  Ole Miss 14–3; 9 plays, 78 yards, 2:33
- (4:15) Ole Miss – Caden Prieskorn 2 Yd pass from Jaxson Dart (Caden Davis Kick)
  Ole Miss 21–3; 8 plays, 60 yards, 3:04
- (1:46) Ole Miss – Dayton Wade 58 Yd pass from Jaxson Dart (Caden Davis Kick)
  Ole Miss 28–3; 3 plays, 60 yards, 1:07

Fourth Quarter

- (6:12) Ole Miss – Cayden Lee 51 Yd pass from Spencer Sanders (Caden Costa Kick)
  Ole Miss 35–3; 6 plays, 81 yards, 2:02

Statistics	Louisiana–Monroe	Ole Miss
First downs	19	27
Total yards	258	498
Passing yards	66	371
Rushes/yards	46/192	37/127
Penalties/yards	7/65	8/81
Turnovers	1	0
Time of possession	34:04	25:56

Team	Category	Player	Statistics
Louisiana–Monroe	Passing	Jiya Wright	7/19, 56 yards, 1 INT
Louisiana–Monroe	Rushing	Hunter Smith	17 carries, 74 yards
Louisiana–Monroe	Receiving	Tyrone Howell	3 receptions, 34 yards
Ole Miss	Passing	Jaxson Dart	24/31, 310 yards, 3 TD
Ole Miss	Rushing	Quinshon Judkins	18 carries, 65 yards
Ole Miss	Receiving	Dayton Wade	7 receptions, 108 yards, 1 TD

=== at Louisiana ===
Louisiana–Monroe Warhawks (2–9) at Louisiana Ragin' Cajuns (5–6)

Quarter	1	2	3	4	Total
Warhawks	7	7	0	7	21
Ragin' Cajuns	7	24	14	7	52

at Cajun Field, Lafayette, Louisiana

- Date: November 25, 2023
- Game time: 2:00 p.m. CDT
- Game weather: 68 °F (20 °C) • Weather: Sunny • Wind: NE 7 MPH
- Game attendance: 13,892
- Referee: Marshall Lewis
- TV announcers (ESPN+): Dan McDonald (play-by-play) and Eric Mouton (analyst)

Game information

First Quarter

- (9:36) LA – Chandler Fields 5-yard rush (Kenneth Almendares kick) (Drive: 9 plays, 50 yards, 4:16; Louisiana 7–0)
- (1:45) ULM – Jiya Wright 2-yard rush (Braxton Guillbeau kick) (Drive: 14 plays, 77 yards, 7:44; Tied 7–7)

Second Quarter

- (14:41) LA – Zylan Perry 3-yard rush (Kenneth Almendares kick) (Drive: 7 plays, 58 yards, 2:04; Louisiana 14–7)
- (9:41) LA – Kenneth Almendares 24-yard field goal (Drive: 6 plays, 47 yards, 2:43; Louisiana 17–7)
- (8:25) ULM – Dylan Howell 24-yard fumble returned (Braxton Guillbeau kick) (Drive: 1 play, -2 yards, 0:08; Louisiana 17–14)
- (2:51) LA – Jacob Kibodi 3-yard rush (Kenneth Almendares kick) (Drive: 11 plays, 86 yards, 5:24; Louisiana 24–14)
- (0:32) LA – Neal Johnson 24-yard pass from Chandler Fields (Kenneth Almendares kick) (Drive: 5 plays, 50 yards, 1:59; Louisiana 31–14)

Third Quarter

- (13:20) LA – Neal Johnson 28-yard pass from Chandler Fields (Kenneth Almendares kick) (Drive: 4 plays, 49 yards, 1:37; Louisiana 38–14)
- (4:06) LA – Elijah Davis 10-yard rush (Kenneth Almendares kick) (Drive: 7 plays, 85 yards, 3:08; Louisiana 45–14)

Fourth Quarter

- (7:14) ULM – Alred Luke 16-yard pass from Blake Murphy (Braxton Guillbeau kick) (Drive: 13 plays, 51 yards, 4:53; Louisiana 45–21)
- (0:37) LA – Elijah Davis 2-yard rush (Alan Guerrieri kick) (Drive: 11 plays, 75 yards, 6:37; Louisiana 52–21)

Win Probability

Line

- LA –12.5

Over/Under

- 53.5

Statistics	ULM	ULL
First downs	16	29
Total yards	239	476
Rushing yards	153	230
Passing yards	86	246
Turnovers	2	1
Time of possession	30:20	29:40

Team	Category	Player	Statistics
Louisiana–Monroe	Passing	Jiya Wright	6/10, 66 yards, 1 INT
Louisiana–Monroe	Rushing	Bennett Galloway	16 carries, 87 yards
Louisiana–Monroe	Receiving	Tyrone Howell	2 receptions, 40 yards
Louisiana	Passing	Chandler Fields	18/20, 246 yards, 2 TD
Louisiana	Rushing	Elijah Davis	14 carries, 109 yards, 2 TD
Louisiana	Receiving	Neal Johnson	3 receptions, 67 yards, 2 TD
