= 2023 Southern Miss Golden Eagles football team =

American college football season

2023 Southern Miss Golden Eagles football
- Conference: Sun Belt Conference
- West Division
- Record: 3–9 (2–6 Sun Belt)
- Head coach: Will Hall (3rd season)
- Offensive coordinator: Sam Gregg (3rd season)
- Offensive scheme: Multiple
- Defensive coordinator: Dan O'Brien (1st season)
- Base defense: 4–2–5
- Home stadium: M. M. Roberts Stadium

2023 Sun Belt Conference football standings
	Conf.			Overall
Team	W		L	W		L
East Division
James Madison* x	7	–	1	11	–	2
Appalachian State y	6	–	2	9	–	5
Coastal Carolina	5	–	3	8	–	5
Old Dominion	5	–	3	6	–	7
Georgia State	3	–	5	7	–	6
Marshall	3	–	5	6	–	7
Georgia Southern	3	–	5	6	–	7
West Division
Troy xy$	7	–	1	11	–	3
Texas State	4	–	4	8	–	5
Arkansas State	4	–	4	6	–	7
South Alabama	4	–	4	7	–	6
Louisiana	3	–	5	6	–	7
Southern Miss	2	–	6	3	–	9
Louisiana–Monroe	0	–	8	2	–	10
Championship: Troy 49, Appalachian State 23
$ – Conference champion; x – Division champion/co-champions; y – Championship game participant; * – Ineligible for postseason play due to FCS-to-FBS transition rules

The 2023 Southern Miss Golden Eagles football team represented the University of Southern Mississippi as a member of the Sun Belt Conference during the 2023 NCAA Division I FBS football season. They were led by head coach Will Hall, who is coaching his third season with the team. The Golden Eagles played their home games at M. M. Roberts Stadium in Hattiesburg, Mississippi.

== Preseason ==
=== Media poll ===
In the Sun Belt preseason coaches' poll, the Golden Eagles were picked to finish in fourth place in the West Division.

Running back Frank Gore Jr., defensive back Jay Stanley, and all purpose back Frank Gore Jr. were named to the preseason All-Sun Belt first team. Defensive lineman Jalen Williams was named to the second team.

== Schedule ==
The football schedule was announced February 24, 2023.

Date	Time	Opponent	Site	TV	Result	Attendance
September 2	6:00 p.m.	Alcorn State*	M. M. Roberts Stadium; Hattiesburg, MS	ESPN+	W 40–14	30,335
September 9	7:30 p.m.	at No. 4 Florida State*	Doak Campbell Stadium; Tallahassee, FL	ACCN	L 13–66	74,467
September 16	3:00 p.m.	Tulane*	M. M. Roberts Stadium; Hattiesburg, MS (Battle for the Bell)	ESPNU	L 3–21	25,038
September 23	6:00 p.m.	at Arkansas State	Centennial Bank Stadium; Jonesboro, AR	ESPN+	L 37–44	16,601
September 30	6:00 p.m.	Texas State	M. M. Roberts Stadium; Hattiesburg, MS	ESPN+	L 36–50	21,304
October 7	6:00 p.m.	Old Dominion^{†}	M. M. Roberts Stadium; Hattiesburg, MS	ESPN+	L 13–17	23,011
October 17	6:30 p.m.	at South Alabama	Hancock Whitney Stadium; Mobile, AL	ESPN2	L 3–55	23,478
October 28	2:30 p.m.	at Appalachian State	Kidd Brewer Stadium; Boone, NC	ESPN+	L 38–48	32,601
November 4	3:00 p.m.	Louisiana–Monroe	M. M. Roberts Stadium; Hattiesburg, MS	ESPN+	W 24–7	20,193
November 9	6:30 p.m.	at Louisiana	Cajun Field; Lafayette, LA	ESPNU	W 34–31 ^{OT}	15,137
November 18	11:00 a.m.	at Mississippi State*	Davis Wade Stadium; Starkville, MS	ESPN+/SECN+	L 20–41	53,855
November 25	11:00 a.m.	Troy	M. M. Roberts Stadium; Hattiesburg, MS	ESPNU	L 17–35	19,766
*Non-conference game; ^{†}Homecoming; Rankings from AP Poll and CFP Rankings released prior to game; All times are in Eastern time

== Game summaries ==
=== Alcorn State ===
Game One – Alcorn State Braves (0–0) at Southern Miss Golden Eagles (0–0) – Game summary

Quarter	1	2	3	4	Total
Braves	7	0	0	7	14
Golden Eagles	17	10	10	3	40

at M.M. Roberts Stadium, Hattiesburg, MS

- Date: Saturday, September 2, 2023
- Game time: 6:00 p.m. CDT
- Game weather: Cloudy • Temperature: 86 °F (30 °C) • Wind: E 4 mph
- Game attendance: 30,335
- Referee: Trennis Livingston
- TV announcers (ESPN+): TBD

Game information

First quarter

- (12:53) USM - Jakarius Caston 16-yard pass from Billy Wiles, Andrew Stein Kick (Drive: 3 plays, 53 yards, 1:25; USM 7-0)
- (7:34) USM - Frank Gore Jr. 9-yard run, Andrew Stein kick (Drive: 7 plays, 63 yards, 3:33; USM 14-0)
- (4:03) USM - Andrew Stein 45-yard field goal (Drive: 6 plays, 17 yards, 2:23; USM 17-0)
- (3:50) ALCN - Tyler Macon 75-yard run, Noah Kiani kick (Drive: 1 play, 75 yards, 0:13; 'USM 17-7)

Second quarter

- (10:56) USM - Frank Gore Jr. 2-yard pass from Billy Wiles, Andrew Stein kick (Drive: 14 plays, 65 yards, 7:54; USM 24-7)
- (0:30) USM - Andrew Stein 23-yard field goal (Drive: 8 plays, 64 yards, 4:21; USM 27-7)

Third quarter

- (9:35) USM - Andrew Stein 52-yard field goal (Drive: 6 plays, 0 yards, 2:57; USM 30-7)
- (4:31) USM - Tyquan Henderson 3-yard pass from Billy Wiles, Andrew Stein kick (Drive: 8 plays, 79 yards, 3:39; USM 37-7)

Fourth quarter

- (9:08) ALCN - Niko Duffey 15-yard run, Noah Kiani kick (Drive: 8 plays, 72 yards, 4:22; USM 37-14)
- (4:26) USM - Andrew Stein 41-yard field goal (Drive: 8 plays, 51 yards, 4:36; USM 40-14)

Statistics	ALCN	USM
First downs	8	25
Total yards	226	441
Rushing yards	182	145
Passing yards	44	296
Turnovers	2	1
Time of possession	21:43	38:17

Team	Category	Player	Statistics
Alcorn State	Passing	Aaron Allen	5/9, 44 yards
Alcorn State	Rushing	Tyler Macon	4 carries, 83 yards, 1 TD
Alcorn State	Receiving	Malik Rodgers	1 reception, 26 yards
Southern Miss	Passing	Billy Wiles	21/28, 267 yards, 3 TD, 1 INT
Southern Miss	Rushing	Rodrigues Clark	9 carries, 54 yards
Southern Miss	Receiving	Jakarius Caston	5 receptions, 104 yards, 1 TD

=== at No. 4 Florida State ===
Game Two – Southern Miss Golden Eagles (1–0) at No. 4 Florida State Seminoles (1–0) – Game summary

Quarter	1	2	3	4	Total
Golden Eagles	0	3	7	3	13
No. 4 Seminoles	14	17	21	14	66

at Doak Campbell Stadium, Tallahassee, FL

- Date: Saturday, September 9, 2023
- Game time: 7:30 p.m. CDT
- Game weather: Sunny
- Game attendance: 74,467
- Referee: Tim Hedgepeth
- TV announcers (ACCN): Jorge Sedano (play-by-play), Orlando Franklin (color)

Game information

First quarter

- (11:29) FSU - Darion Williamson 10-yard pass from Jordan Travis, Ryan Fitzgerald kick (Drive: 8 plays, 76 yards, 3:31; FSU 7-0)
- (2:44) FSU - Trey Benson 19-yard run, Ryan Fitzgerald kick (Drive: 12 plays, 54 yards, 5:23; FSU 14-0)

Second quarter

- (11:28) USM - Andrew Stein 30-yard field goal (Drive: 9 plays, 57 yards, 4:26; FSU 14-3)
- (7:42) FSU - Trey Benson 3-yard run, Ryan Fitzgerald kick (Drive: 7 plays, 69 yards, 3:46; FSU 21-3)
- (3:36) FSU - Keon Coleman 6-yard pass from Jordan Travis, Ryan Fitzgerald kick (Drive: 6 plays, 65 yards, 2:15; FSU 28-3)
- (0:00) FSU - Ryan Fitzgerald 35-yard field goal (Drive: 10 plays, 39 yards, 2:33; FSU 31-3)

Third quarter

- (13:06) FSU - Trey Benson 42-yard run, Ryan Fitzgerald kick (Drive: 2 plays, 45 yards, 0:53; FSU 38-3)
- (12:17) FSU - Jarrian Jones 30-yard interception return, Ryan Fitzgerald kick (FSU 45-3)
- (10:26) FSU - Markeston Douglas 42-yard pass from Tate Rodemaker, Ryan Fitzgerald kick (Drive: 1 play, 42 yards, 0:10; FSU 52-3)
- (4:41) USM - Rodrigues Clark 12-yard run, Andrew Stein kick (Drive: 13 plays, 89 yards, 5:45; FSU 52-10)

Fourth quarter

- (14:09) FSU - Vandrevious Jacobs 13-yard pass from Tate Rodemaker, Ryan Fitzgerald kick (Drive: 9 plays, 83 yards, 5:32; FSU 59-10)
- (11:00) FSU - Caziah Holmes 40-yard run, Ryan Fitzgerald kick (Drive: 3 plays, 72 yards, 1:17; FSU 66-10)
- (5:32) USM - Andrew Stein 40-yard field goal (Drive: 9 plays, 52 yards, 5:28; FSU 66-13)

Statistics	USM	FSU
First downs	18	26
Total yards	258	554
Rushing yards	104	306
Passing yards	154	248
Turnovers	1	0
Time of possession	27:27	32:33

Team	Category	Player	Statistics
Southern Miss	Passing	Billy Wiles	11/34, 154 yards, 1 INT
Southern Miss	Rushing	Rodrigues Clark	15 carries, 86 yards, 1 TD
Southern Miss	Receiving	Antavious Willis	2 receptions, 35 yards
Florida State	Passing	Jordan Travis	15/29, 175 yards, 2 TD
Florida State	Rushing	Trey Benson	9 carries, 79 yards, 3 TD
Florida State	Receiving	Keon Coleman	3 receptions, 48 yards, 1 TD

=== Tulane ===
Game Three – Tulane Green Wave (1–1) at Southern Miss Golden Eagles (1–1) – Game summary

Quarter	1	2	3	4	Total
Green Wave	7	0	14	0	21
Golden Eagles	0	0	3	0	3

at M.M. Roberts Stadium, Hattiesburg, MS

- Date: Saturday, September 16, 2023
- Game time: 3:00 p.m. CDT
- Game weather: Sunny • Temperature: 92 °F (33 °C) • Wind: NW 12 mph
- Game attendance: 25,038
- Referee: Jeremy Parker
- TV announcers (ESPNU): Jay Alter (play-by-play), Rene Ingoglia (color)

Game information

First Quarter

- (12:16) TUL – Kai Horton 1-yard run, Valentino Ambrosio kick (Drive: 7 plays, 75 yards, 2:44; Tulane 7–0)

Second Quarter

No scoring

Third Quarter

- (10:19) TUL – Jha'Quan Jackson 35-yard pass from Kai Horton, Valentino Ambrosio kick (Drive: 5 plays, 70 yards, 2:19; Tulane 14–0)
- (5:45) USM – Valentino Ambrosio 29-yard field goal (Drive: 9 plays, 59 yards, 4:27; Tulane 14–3)
- (2:03) TUL – Chris Brazzell II 3-yard pass from Kai Horton, Valentino Ambrosio kick (Drive: 9 plays, 75 yards, 3:42; Tulane 21–3)

Fourth Quarter

No scoring

Statistics	TUL	USM
First downs	18	14
Total yards	314	212
Rushing yards	128	35
Passing yards	186	177
Turnovers	0	0
Time of possession	28:23	31:37

Team	Category	Player	Statistics
Tulane	Passing	Kai Horton	12/19, 186 yards, 2 TD
Tulane	Rushing	Makhi Hughes	13 carries, 83 yards
Tulane	Receiving	Lawrence Keys III	4 receptions, 78 yards
Southern Miss	Passing	Billy Wiles	19/33, 177 yards
Southern Miss	Rushing	Rodrigues Clark	5 carries, 17 yards
Southern Miss	Receiving	Jakarius Caston	2 receptions, 54 yards

=== at Arkansas State ===
Game Four – Southern Miss Golden Eagles (1–2) at Arkansas State Red Wolves (1–2) – Game summary

Quarter	1	2	3	4	Total
Golden Eagles	7	10	10	10	37
Red Wolves	14	6	14	10	44

at Centennial Bank Stadium, Jonesboro, AR

- Date: Saturday, September 23, 2023
- Game time: 6:00 p.m. CDT
- Game weather: Sunny
- Game attendance: 16,601
- Referee: Scott Broadway
- TV announcers (ESPN+): TBD

Game information

First quarter

- (9:10) USM - Frank Gore Jr. 2-yard run, Andrew Stein kick (Drive: 12 plays, 84 yards, 5:42; USM 7-0)
- (6:03) ASU - Jeff Foreman 33-yard pass from Jaylen Raynor, Dominic Zvada kick (Drive: 7 plays, 78 yards, 3:01; Tied 7-7)
- (3:40) ASU - Courtney Jackson 5-yard pass from Jaylen Raynor, Dominic Zvada kick (Drive: 3 plays, 8 yards, 1:22; ASU 14-7)

Second quarter

- (14:51) ASU - Dominic Zvada 36-yard field goal (Drive: 4 plays, 7 yards: 1:21; ASU 17-7)
- (11:06) USM - Latreal Jones 28-yard pass from Billy Wiles, Andrew Stein kick (Drive: 7 plays, 65 yards, 3:39; ASU 17-14)
- (10:13) ASU - Dominic Zvada 53-yard field goal (Drive: 4 plays, 3 yards, 0:53; ASU 20-14)
- (6:23) USM - Andrew Stein 23-yard field goal (Drive: 9 plays, 51 yards, 3:41; ASU 20-17)

Third quarter

- (14:46) ASU - Courtney Jackson 60-yard pass from Jaylen Raynor, Dominic Zvada kick (Drive: 1 play, 60 yards, 0:09; ASU 27-17)
- (9:47) ASU - Jaylen Raynor 8-yard run, Dominic Zvada kick (Drive: 6 plays, 89 yards, 2:36; ASU 34-17)
- (6:28) USM - Rodrigues Clark 59-yard run, Andrew Stein kick (Drive: 6 plays, 75 yards, 3:19; ASU 34-24)
- (3:10) USM - Andrew Stein 42-yard field goal (Drive: 6 plays, 38 yards, 1:50; ASU 34-27)

Fourth quarter

- (14:00) USM - Jakarius Caston 22-yard pass from Billy Wiles, Andrew Stein kick (Drive: 3 plays, 50 yards, 0:37; Tied 34-34)
- (3:50) ASU - Dominic Zvada 21-yard field goal (Drive: 8 plays, 51 yards, 4:00; ASU 37-34)
- (2:28) ASU - Jaylen Raynor 62-yard run, Dominic Zvada kick (Drive: 2 plays, 64 yards, 0:14; ASU 44-34)
- (0:16) USM - Andrew Stein 37-yard field goal (Drive: 10 plays, 46 yards, 2:11; ASU 44-37)

Statistics	USM	ASU
First downs	20	18
Total yards	449	425
Rushing yards	234	192
Passing yards	215	233
Turnovers	2	1
Time of possession	30:28	29:32

Team	Category	Player	Statistics
Southern Miss	Passing	Billy Wiles	20/36, 215 yards, 2 TD, 2 INT
Southern Miss	Rushing	Frank Gore Jr.	20 carries, 132 yards, 1 TD
Southern Miss	Receiving	Jakarius Caston	4 receptions, 65 yards, 1 TD
Arkansas State	Passing	Jaylen Raynor	11/21, 233 yards, 3 TD, 1 INT
Arkansas State	Rushing	Jaylen Raynor	17 carries, 97 yards, 2 TD
Arkansas State	Receiving	Courtney Jackson	3 receptions, 94 yards, 2 TD

=== Texas State ===
Game Five – Texas State Bobcats at Southern Miss Golden Eagles – Game summary

Quarter	1	2	3	4	Total
Bobcats	28	14	0	8	50
Golden Eagles	3	7	6	20	36

at M. M. Roberts Stadium, Hattiesburg, Mississippi

- Date: Saturday, September 30, 2023
- Game time: 6:00 p.m. CDT
- Game weather: Clear, 87 °F (31 °C)
- Game attendance: 21,304
- Referee: Ted Pitts
- TV announcers (ESPN+): Jason Baker and Larry Boyd
- Box score, Recap

Game information
First quarter
- TXST – Ismail Mahdi 100-yard kickoff return (Mason Shipley kick), 14:46. Bobcats 7–0.
- TXST – Kole Wilson 5-yard pass from T. J. Finley (Mason Shipley kick), 11:48. Bobcats 14–0. Drive: 6 plays, 21 yards, 2:46.
- TXST – Ismail Mahdi 3-yard run (Mason Shipley kick), 6:57. Bobcats 21–0. Drive: 7 plays, 74 yards, 2:37.
- USM – Andrew Stein 38-yard field goal, 1:16. Bobcats 21–3. Drive: 9 plays, 58 yards, 5:35.
- TXST – Joey Hobert 5-yard pass from T. J. Finley (Mason Shipey kick), 0:39. Bobcats 28–3. Drive: 3 plays, 75 yards, 0:37.

Second quarter

- USM – Frank Gore Jr. 1-yard run (Andrew Stein kick), 12:13. Bobcats 28–10. Drive: 9 plays, 75 yards, 3:26.
- TXST – Ismail Mahdi 23-yard run (Mason Shipley kick), 7:40. Bobcats 35–10. Drive: 4 plays, 84 yards, 1:28.
- TXST – Ismail Mahdi 8-yard run (Mason Shipley kick), 3:22. Bobcats 42–10. Drive: 7 plays, 64 yards, 3:09.

Third quarter

- USM – Tiaquelin Mims 11-yard pass from Billy Wiles (kick blocked), 12:28. Bobcats 42–16. Drive: 5 plays, 57 yards, 2:24.

Fourth quarter

- USM – Jakarius Caston 8-yard pass from Billy Wiles (Andrew Stein kick), 12:31. Bobcats 42–23. Drive: 10 plays, 80 yards, 4:51.
- USM – Billy Wiles 4-yard run (run failed), 10:52. Bobcats 42–29. Drive: 4 plays, 33 yards, 1:23.
- USM – Frank Gore Jr. 1-yard run (Andrew Stein kick), 6:16. Bobcats 42–36. Drive: 5 plays, 73 yards, 2:04.
- TXST – Malik Hornsby 14-yard run (Kole Wilson pass to Drew Donley), 1:39. Bobcats 50–36. Drive: 3 plays, 18 yards, 0:18.

Statistics

Statistics	TXST	USM
First downs	22	28
Total yards	516	510
Rushing yards	178	235
Passing yards	338	275
Turnovers	3	2
Time of possession	23:22	36:38

Team	Category	Player	Statistics
Texas State	Passing	T. J. Finley	19/24, 338 yards, 2 TD
Texas State	Rushing	Ismail Mahdi	14 rushes, 89 yards, 3 TD
Texas State	Receiving	Joey Hobert	10 receptions, 126 yards, TD
Southern Miss	Passing	Billy Wiles	21/44, 275 yards, 2 TD, INT
Southern Miss	Rushing	Frank Gore Jr.	24 rushes, 123 yards, 2 TD
Southern Miss	Receiving	Latreal Jones	6 receptions, 124 yards

=== Old Dominion ===
Game Six – Old Dominion Monarchs (2–3) at Southern Miss Golden Eagles (1–4) – Game summary

Quarter	1	2	3	4	Total
Monarchs	0	0	0	0	0
Golden Eagles	0	0	0	0	0

at M.M. Roberts Stadium, Hattiesburg, MS

- Date: Saturday, October 7, 2023
- Game time: 6:00 p.m. CDT
- Game weather: -
- Game attendance: 23,011
- Referee: -
- TV announcers (ESPN+): TBD

Game information

First quarter

Second quarter

Third quarter

Fourth quarter

Statistics	ODU	USM
First downs		
Total yards		
Rushing yards		
Passing yards		
Passing: Comp–Att–Int		
Time of possession		

Team	Category	Player	Statistics
Old Dominion	Passing		
Old Dominion	Rushing		
Old Dominion	Receiving		
Southern Miss	Passing		
Southern Miss	Rushing		
Southern Miss	Receiving		

=== at South Alabama ===
Game Seven – Southern Miss Golden Eagles (1-5) at South Alabama Jaguars (3-3) – Game summary

Quarter	1	2	3	4	Total
Southern Miss	0	0	3	0	3
South Alabama	14	17	17	7	55

at Hancock Whitney Stadium • Mobile, Alabama

- Date: Tuesday, October 17, 2023
- Game time: 6:30 p.m. CST
- Game weather: Clear, 53 °F (12 °C)
- Game attendance: 23,478
- Referee: Trennis Livingston
- TV announcers (ESPN2): Clay Matvick (play-by-play), Aaron Murray (analyst), Lauren Sisler (sideline)

Game information

First quarter

- (11:07) USA – La'Damian Webb 5-yard run (Diego Guajardo kick) (Drive: 10 plays, 75 yards, 3:53; South Alabama 7-0)
- (4:17) USA – La'Damian Webb 3-yard run (Diego Guajardo kick) (Drive: 11 plays, 85 yards, 4:36; South Alabama 14-0)

Second quarter

- (10:30) USA – La'Damian Webb 5-yard run (Diego Guajardo kick) (Drive: 14 plays, 80 yards, 6:48; South Alabama 21-0)
- (7:03) USA – Kentrel Bullock 17-yard run (Diego Guajardo kick) (Drive: 6 plays, 51 yards, 2:13; South Alabama 28-0)
- (0:45) USA – Diego Guajardo 23-yard field goal (Drive: 8 plays, 65 yards, 3:44; South Alabama 31-0)

Third quarter

- (10:05) USA – Diego Guajardo 39-yard field goal (Drive: 10 plays, 47 yards, 2:58; South Alabama 34-0)
- (5:40) USM – Andrew Stein 32-yard field goal (Drive: 10 plays, 61 yards, 4:22; South Alabama 34-3)
- (4:41) USA – La'Damian Webb 16-yard run (Diego Guajardo kick) (Drive: 3 plays, 60 yards, 0:53; South Alabama 41-3)
- (1:20) USA – Dorian Smith 29-yard run (Diego Guajardo kick) (Drive: 3 plays, 62 yards, 1:05; South Alabama 48-3)

Fourth quarter

- (13:47) USA – Gio Lopez 20-yard run (Diego Guajardo kick) (Drive: 3 plays, 31 yards, 0:58; South Alabama 55-3)

Statistics	USM	USA
First downs	12	34
Total yards	56–149	75–647
Rushing yards	36–103	44–287
Passing yards	46	360
Passing: Comp–Att–Int	7–20–1	23–31–1
Time of possession	28:45	31:15

Team	Category	Player	Statistics
Southern Miss	Passing	Holman Edwards	5/15, 41 yards, INT
Southern Miss	Rushing	Kenyon Clay	10 carries, 60 yards
Southern Miss	Receiving	Frank Gore Jr.	2 receptions, 22 yards
South Alabama	Passing	Carter Bradley	21/27, 319 yards
South Alabama	Rushing	La'Damian Webb	20 carries, 102 yards, 4 TD
South Alabama	Receiving	Jamaal Pritchett	5 receptions, 122 yards

=== at Appalachian State ===
Game Eight – Southern Miss Golden Eagles (1–6) at Appalachian State Mountaineers (3–4) – Game summary

Quarter	1	2	3	4	Total
Golden Eagles	0	0	0	0	0
Mountaineers	0	0	0	0	0

at Kidd Brewer Stadium, Boone, NC

- Date: Saturday, October 28, 2023
- Game time: 2:30 p.m. CDT
- Game weather: -
- Game attendance: 32,601
- Referee: -
- TV announcers (ESPN+): TBD

Game information

First quarter

Second quarter

Third quarter

Fourth quarter

Statistics	USM	APP
First downs		
Total yards		
Rushing yards		
Passing yards		
Passing: Comp–Att–Int		
Time of possession		

Team	Category	Player	Statistics
Southern Miss	Passing		
Southern Miss	Rushing		
Southern Miss	Receiving		
Appalachian State	Passing		
Appalachian State	Rushing		
Appalachian State	Receiving		

=== Louisiana–Monroe ===
Game Nine – Louisiana–Monroe Warhawks (2–6) at Southern Miss Golden Eagles (1–7) – Game summary

Quarter	1	2	3	4	Total
Warhawks	0	0	0	0	0
Golden Eagles	0	0	0	0	0

at M.M. Roberts Stadium, Hattiesburg, MS

- Date: Saturday, November 4, 2023
- Game time: 3:00 p.m. CDT
- Game weather: -
- Game attendance: 20,193
- Referee: -
- TV announcers (ESPN+): TBD

Game information

First quarter

Second quarter

Third quarter

Fourth quarter

Statistics	ULM	USM
First downs		
Total yards		
Rushing yards		
Passing yards		
Passing: Comp–Att–Int		
Time of possession		

Team	Category	Player	Statistics
Louisiana–Monroe	Passing		
Louisiana–Monroe	Rushing		
Louisiana–Monroe	Receiving		
Southern Miss	Passing		
Southern Miss	Rushing		
Southern Miss	Receiving		

=== at Louisiana ===
Game Ten – Southern Miss Golden Eagles (2–7) at Louisiana Ragin' Cajuns (5–4) – Game summary

Quarter	1	2	3	4	OT	Total
Golden Eagles	0	14	7	7	6	34
Ragin' Cajuns	7	7	0	14	3	31

at Cajun Field, Lafayette, LA

- Date: Thursday, November 9, 2023
- Game time: 6:30 p.m. CDT
- Game weather: 83 °F (28 °C) • Weather: Sunny • Wind: SW 6 MPH
- Game attendance: 15,137
- Referee: Javarro Edwards
- TV announcers (ESPNU): Courtney Lyle (play-by-play) and Hutson Mason (analyst)

Game information

First quarter

- (3:13) LA – Dre'lyn Washington 6-yard rush (Kenneth Almendares kick) (Drive: 10 plays, 75 yards, 4:25; Louisiana 7-0)

Second quarter

- (14:11) USM – Frank Gore Jr. 18-yard pass from Billy Wiles (Andrew Stein kick) (Drive: 9 plays, 80 yards, 3:55; Tied 7-7)
- (8:47) USM – Kenyon Clay 28-yard rush (Andrew Stein kick) (Drive: 9 plays, 83 yards, 4:19; Southern Miss 14-7)
- (8:34) LA – Zylan Perry 95-yard kickoff returned (Kenneth Almendares kick) (Drive: 6 plays, 6 yards, 3:33; Tied 14-14)

Third quarter

- (0:04) USM – Frank Gore Jr. 17-yard rush (Connor Gibbs kick) (Drive: 4 plays, 28 yards, 1:41; Southern Miss 21-14)

Fourth quarter

- (7:22) LA – Harvey Broussard 51-yard pass from Chandler Fields (Kenneth Almendares kick) (Drive: 2 plays, 62 yards, 0:49; Tied 21-21)
- (5:55) LA – Trayv'on Culbert 7-yard pass from Chandler Fields (Kenneth Almendares kick) (Drive: 1 play, 7 yards, 0:08; Louisiana 28-21)
- (1:26) USM – Jakarius Caston 9-yard pass from Ethan Crawford (Connor Gibbs kick) (Drive: 10 plays, 75 yards, 4:29; Tied 28-28)

Overtime

- LA – Kenneth Almendares 34-yard field goal (Drive: 6 plays, 8 yards; Louisiana 31-28)
- USM – Frank Gore Jr. 3-yard rush (Drive: 4 plays, 25 yards; Southern Miss 34-31)

Statistics	USM	ULL
First downs	22	20
Total yards	390	390
Rushing yards	229	130
Passing yards	161	260
Passing: Comp–Att–Int	14–26–0	24–38–0
Time of possession	33:33	26:27

Team	Category	Player	Statistics
Southern Miss	Passing	Billy Wiles	10/16, 105 yards, 1 TD
Southern Miss	Rushing	Frank Gore Jr.	33 carries, 158 yards, 2 TDs
Southern Miss	Receiving	Jakarius Caston	3 receptions, 58 yards, 1 TD
Louisiana	Passing	Chandler Fields	24/38, 260 yards, 2 TDs
Louisiana	Rushing	Dre'lyn Washington	12 carries, 82 yards, 1 TD
Louisiana	Receiving	Harvey Broussard	5 receptions, 77 yards, 1 TD

=== at Mississippi State ===
Game Eleven – Southern Miss Golden Eagles at Mississippi State Bulldogs – Game summary

Quarter	1	2	3	4	Total
Southern Miss	7	0	0	13	20
Mississippi State	3	13	7	18	41

at Davis Wade Stadium • Starkville, MS

- Date: Saturday, November 18, 2023
- Game time: 11:00 AM CST
- Game weather: -
- Game attendance: 61,337
- Referee: -
- TV announcers (SECN+/ESPN+): TBD

Game information

First quarter

Second quarter

Third quarter

Fourth quarter

Statistics	USM	MSST
First downs	10	18
Total yards	246	382
Rushing yards	105	238
Passing yards	141	144
Passing: Comp–Att–Int	11–21–1	12–27–0
Time of possession	31:42	28:18

Team	Category	Player	Statistics
Southern Miss	Passing	Billy Wiles	9/16, 89 yards, TD, INT
Southern Miss	Rushing	Frank Gore Jr.	22 carries, 66 yards
Southern Miss	Receiving	Jakarius Caston	2 receptions, 88 yards, TD
Mississippi State	Passing	Will Rogers	12/27, 144 yards, 2 TD
Mississippi State	Rushing	Jeffery Pittman	10 carries, 98 yards, TD
Mississippi State	Receiving	Zavion Thomas	3 receptions, 66 yards

=== Troy ===
Game Twelve – Troy Trojans at Southern Miss Golden Eagles – Game summary

Quarter	1	2	3	4	Total
Trojans	0	0	0	0	0
Golden Eagles	0	0	0	0	0

at M.M. Roberts Stadium, Hattiesburg, MS

- Date: Saturday, November 25, 2023
- Game time: TBA
- Game weather: -
- Game attendance: -
- Referee: -
- TV announcers (-): TBD

Game information

First quarter

Second quarter

Third quarter

Fourth quarter

Statistics	TROY	USM
First downs		
Total yards		
Rushing yards		
Passing yards		
Passing: Comp–Att–Int		
Time of possession		

Team	Category	Player	Statistics
Troy	Passing		
Troy	Rushing		
Troy	Receiving		
Southern Miss	Passing		
Southern Miss	Rushing		
Southern Miss	Receiving		
