= 2023 Appalachian State Mountaineers football team =

American college football season

2023 Appalachian State Mountaineers football

Cure Bowl champion

Sun Belt Championship, L 23–49 at Troy

Cure Bowl, W 13–9 vs. Miami (OH)
- Conference: Sun Belt Conference
- East Division
- Record: 9–5 (6–2 Sun Belt)
- Head coach: Shawn Clark (4th season)
- Offensive coordinator: Frank Ponce (2nd season)
- Offensive scheme: Pro tempo
- Defensive coordinator: Scot Sloan (1st season)
- Base defense: 3–4
- Home stadium: Kidd Brewer Stadium

2023 Sun Belt Conference football standings
| | Conf. | | | Overall |
| Team | W | | L | W | | L |
|---|---|---|---|---|---|---|
East Division
| James Madison* x | 7 | – | 1 | 11 | – | 2 |
| Appalachian State y | 6 | – | 2 | 9 | – | 5 |
| Coastal Carolina | 5 | – | 3 | 8 | – | 5 |
| Old Dominion | 5 | – | 3 | 6 | – | 7 |
| Georgia State | 3 | – | 5 | 7 | – | 6 |
| Marshall | 3 | – | 5 | 6 | – | 7 |
| Georgia Southern | 3 | – | 5 | 6 | – | 7 |
West Division
| Troy xy$ | 7 | – | 1 | 11 | – | 3 |
| Texas State | 4 | – | 4 | 8 | – | 5 |
| Arkansas State | 4 | – | 4 | 6 | – | 7 |
| South Alabama | 4 | – | 4 | 7 | – | 6 |
| Louisiana | 3 | – | 5 | 6 | – | 7 |
| Southern Miss | 2 | – | 6 | 3 | – | 9 |
| Louisiana–Monroe | 0 | – | 8 | 2 | – | 10 |
Championship: Troy 49, Appalachian State 23
$ – Conference champion; x – Division champion/co-champions; y – Championship game participant; * – Ineligible for postseason play due to FCS-to-FBS transition rules

The 2023 Appalachian State Mountaineers football team represented Appalachian State University during the 2023 NCAA Division I FBS football season. The Mountaineers were led by fourth-year head coach Shawn Clark. Appalachian State played home games at Kidd Brewer Stadium on the school's Boone, North Carolina, campus, and competed as a member of the East Division of the Sun Belt Conference.

== Offseason ==
=== Coaching changes ===
On November 28, 2022, defensive coordinator Dale Jones left the program.

On January 13, 2023, the Mountaineers hired Scot Sloan to be their defensive coordinator.

On January 16 Appalachian State hired Frank Ponce to be their offensive coordinator after 2022 offensive coordinator Kevin Barbay left to become the offensive coordinator at Mississippi State.

=== Media poll ===
In the Sun Belt preseason coaches' poll, the Mountaineers were picked to finish in second place in the East division.

Offensive lineman Isaiah Helms and right safety Milan Tucker were named to the preseason All-Sun Belt first team. Offensive lineman Damion Daley was named to the second team.

== Schedule ==
The football schedule was announced on February 24, 2023.

| Date | Time | Opponent | Site | TV | Result | Attendance |
|---|---|---|---|---|---|---|
| September 2 | 3:30 p.m. | No. 25 (FCS) Gardner–Webb* | Kidd Brewer Stadium; Boone, NC | ESPN+ | W 45–24 | 36,075 |
| September 9 | 5:15 p.m. | at No. 17 North Carolina* | Kenan Memorial Stadium; Chapel Hill, NC | ACCN | L 34–40 ^{2OT} | 50,500 |
| September 16 | 3:30 p.m. | East Carolina* | Kidd Brewer Stadium; Boone, NC | ESPN+ | W 43–28 | 40,168 |
| September 23 | 7:00 p.m. | at Wyoming* | War Memorial Stadium; Laramie, WY | CBSSN | L 19–22 | 21,169 |
| September 30 | 8:00 p.m. | at Louisiana–Monroe | Malone Stadium; Monroe, LA | ESPN+ | W 41–40 | 19,919 |
| October 10 | 7:30 p.m. | Coastal Carolina | Kidd Brewer Stadium; Boone, NC | ESPN2 | L 24–27 | 34,252 |
| October 21 | 7:00 p.m | at Old Dominion | S.B. Ballard Stadium; Norfolk, VA (Oyster Bowl) | NFLN | L 21–28 | 20,017 |
| October 28 | 3:30 p.m. | Southern Miss^{†} | Kidd Brewer Stadium; Boone, NC | ESPN+ | W 48–38 | 32,601 |
| November 4 | 6:00 p.m. | Marshall | Kidd Brewer Stadium; Boone, NC (rivalry) | NFLN | W 31–9 | 34,057 |
| November 11 | 2:00 p.m. | at Georgia State | Center Parc Stadium; Atlanta, GA | ESPN+ | W 42–14 | 14,260 |
| November 18 | 2:00 p.m. | at James Madison | Bridgeforth Stadium; Harrisonburg, VA (College GameDay) | ESPN+ | W 26–23 ^{OT} | 25,838 |
| November 25 | 3:30 p.m. | Georgia Southern | Kidd Brewer Stadium; Boone, NC (rivalry) | ESPNU | W 55–27 | 31,248 |
| December 2 | 4:00 p.m. | at Troy | Veterans Memorial Stadium; Troy, AL (Sun Belt Championship Game) | ESPN | L 23–49 | 20,183 |
| December 16 | 3:30 p.m. | vs. Miami (OH) | FBC Mortgage Stadium; Orlando, FL (Cure Bowl) | ABC | W 13–9 | 11,121 |
*Non-conference game; ^{†}Homecoming; Rankings from AP Poll and CFP Rankings released prior to game; All times are in Eastern time

== Personnel ==
2023 Appalachian State Mountaineers football team roster
Players
Coaches
Offense

| Pos. | # | Name | Class |
|---|---|---|---|
| WR | 0 | Milan Tucker | Jr |
| RB | 1 | Anderson Castle | Jr |
| WR | 2 | Kaedin Robinson | Jr |
| RB | 3 | Ahmani Marshall | Jr |
| QB | 4 | Joey Aguilar | Jr |
| RB | 5 | Nate Noel | Jr |
| WR | 6 | Dashaun Davis | Jr |
| WR | 11 | Grant Tucker | Fr |
| WR | 12 | Michael Hetzel | So |
| WR | 13 | Christian Horn | Jr |
| RB | 14 | Kanye Roberts | Fr |
| WR | 15 | Makai Jackson | So |
| QB | 16 | David Hernandez | Sr |
| QB | 17 | Mason McHugh | Fr |
| QB | 18 | Ryan Burger | Fr |
| QB | 19 | Cameron Estep | Fr |
| RB | 20 | Jaylon Calhoun | Fr |
| WR | 21 | Reece Larson | Fr |
| RB | 27 | Michael Dipasquale | Fr |
| RB | 28 | Maquel Haywood | Jr |
| TE | 35 | Dylan Castoria | So |
| OL | 51 | Cayden Sweatt | Fr |
| OL | 53 | Jake Ganoe | Fr |
| OL | 54 | Isaiah Helms | Sr |
| OL | 55 | Seth Williams | So |
| OL | 58 | Blake Bradford | Fr |
| OL | 59 | Jack Murphy | So |
| OL | 60 | Ethan Ryan | So |
| OL | 62 | Bucky Williams | Sr |
| OL | 63 | Jayden Ramsey | So |
| OL | 70 | Thornton Gentry | So |
| OL | 72 | Markell Samuel | So |
| OL | 73 | Jaden Lindsay | So |
| OL | 74 | Griffin Scroggs | Fr |
| OL | 75 | Damion Daley | Sr |
| OL | 76 | Logan Randolph | Fr |
| OL | 77 | Daniel Davis | Fr |
| OL | 78 | Joseph Solomon | So |
| TE | 80 | Max Drag | Fr |
| TE | 81 | Miller Gibbs | Sr |
| WR | 82 | Chris Lawson Jr. | Fr |
| WR | 83 | Coen Sutton | So |
| WR | 84 | Ayden Burkey | Fr |
| TE | 85 | David Larkins | So |
| TE | 86 | Kanen Hamlett | Fr |
| TE | 87 | Eli Wilson | Jr |
| WR | 88 | Luke Hale | Fr |
| TE | 89 | August Drews | So |

Defense

| Pos. | # | Name | Class |
|---|---|---|---|
| CB | 2 | Tyrek Funderburk | Sr |
| DB | 4 | Nicholas Ross | Sr |
| DE | 5 | Michael Fletcher | Jr |
| S | 6 | EJ Jackson | Sr |
| ILB | 7 | Andrew Parker Jr. | Sr |
| OLB | 8 | Brendan Harrington | Jr |
| CB | 9 | Jarrett Paul | Sr |
| DB | 10 | DJ VanHook | Sr |
| DB | 11 | Jordan Favors | So |
| DE | 12 | Shawn Collins | So |
| CB | 13 | Trenton Alan Yowe | So |
| ILB | 14 | Jayden Bethea | Fr |
| OLB | 15 | Thomas Davis | So |
| CB | 16 | Omari Philyaw | Fr |
| S | 17 | Jalik Thomas | Jr |
| CB | 18 | James Edwards | Fr |
| CB | 19 | Ethan Johnson | So |
| OLB | 20 | Nathan Kibambe | Sr |
| S | 21 | DJ Burks | Fr |
| CB | 22 | DJ Porter | Fr |
| OLB | 24 | Cahari Haynes | Fr |
| S | 25 | Jackson Greene | Jr |
| OLB | 26 | Caden Sullivan | So |
| S | 27 | Ronald Clarke | Jr |
| S | 28 | Zyeir Gamble | Fr |
| DE | 29 | Santana Hopper | Fr |
| S | 30 | Carter Greene | Fr |
| S | 31 | Dyvon McKinney | So |
| ILB | 33 | Derrell Farrar | Fr |
| S | 34 | Colton Phares | Fr |
| ILB | 35 | Jack Scroggs | Jr |
| DL | 36 | Kevon Haigler | Jr |
| DB | 37 | Andre Hamilton | So |
| DB | 39 | Tony Harris | Fr |
| ILB | 40 | Cole Becker | Fr |
| ILB | 42 | Braxton Veiga | Fr |
| ILB | 43 | Ryan McKinnis | Fr |
| OLB | 44 | Brodrick Gooch | Fr |
| ILB | 45 | Trevor Moffitt | So |
| ILB | 46 | Isaiah McGuffin | Fr |
| OLB | 47 | Romelo Bell | Fr |
| DL | 48 | DeShawn McKnight | Jr |
| ILB | 49 | Randy Marion III | Fr |
| DE | 50 | DeAndre Dingle-Prince | Jr |
| ILB | 52 | Orlando Leon | Fr |
| DL | 54 | Danny Stevens | Fr |
| ILB | 56 | Kyle Arnholt | So |
| OLB | 88 | Donovan Spellman | So |
| OLB | 90 | Nate Johnson | Fr |
| DT | 91 | Markus Clark | So |
| DE | 92 | AJ Mebane | Fr |
| DE | 94 | Stephen Passeggiata | So |
| DE | 95 | Montez Kelley | Jr |
| DE | 96 | Josiah Wyatt | Fr |
| DE | 97 | Kevin Abrams-Verwayne | So |
| DT | 98 | Jason Hertz | Fr |

Special teams

| Pos. | # | Name | Class |
|---|---|---|---|
| K | 22 | Cash McVay | So |
| K | 37 | Carter Everett | Fr |
| P | 41 | Conner Maynard | Jr |
| LS | 42 | Christian Johnstone | Jr |
| LS | 44 | Jake Mann | So |
| P | 49 | Mitchell Lake | Fr |
| K | 57 | Austin Shook | So |
| K | 99 | Michael Hughes | Jr |

Head coach

- Shawn Clark (Appalachian State)

Coordinators/assistant coaches

- Frank Ponce (Arizona Western)
  Offensive coordinator/QB
- Scot Sloan (Clemson)
  Defensive coordinator/Safeties
- Justin Watts (Clemson)
  Passing game coordinator/TE
- Victor Cabral (Georgia Southern)
  Defensive Line
- Mike Cummings (Buffalo)
  Offensive Line
- Travis Cunningham (Gardner–Webb)
  Inside linebackers
- Lawrence Dawsey (Florida State)
  Wide receivers
- Brian Haines (Marietta College)
  Special teams coordinator/RB
- AJ Howard (Appalachian State)
  Outside linebackers
- Rod West (Alabama State)
  Defensive passing game coordinator/cornerbacks
- Matt Greenhalgh (Rhode Island)
  Director of athletic performance for football

Legend

- (C) Team captain
- (S) Suspended
- (I) Ineligible
- Injured
- Redshirt

Roster
