= Jon Sumrall =

American football player and coach (born 1982)

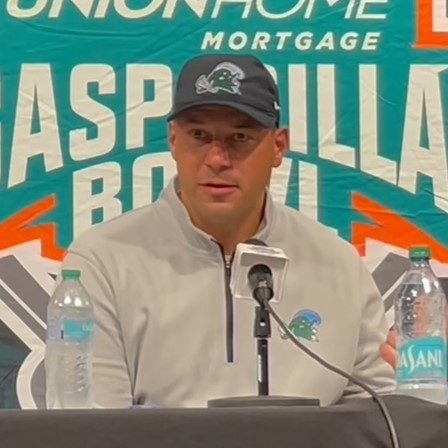
- Sumrall after the 2024 Gasparilla Bowl

Current position
- Title: Head coach
- Team: Florida
- Conference: SEC
- Record: 7–4
- Annual salary: $7.45 million

Biographical details
- Born: July 5, 1982 (age 44); Texarkana, Texas, U.S.

Playing career
- 2001–2004: Kentucky
- Position: Linebacker

Coaching career (HC unless noted)
- 2005–2006: Kentucky (GA)
- 2007–2009: San Diego (DL/RC)
- 2010–2011: San Diego (AHC/DC/LB)
- 2012–2013: Tulane (co-DC/DL)
- 2014: Tulane (co-DC/LB)
- 2015–2017: Troy (AHC/LB/ST)
- 2018: Ole Miss (LB)
- 2019–2020: Kentucky (ILB)
- 2021: Kentucky (co-DC/ILB)
- 2022–2023: Troy
- 2024–2025: Tulane
- 2026–present: Florida

Head coaching record
- Overall: 50–16 (.758)
- Bowls: 1–1 (.500)
- Tournaments: 0–1 (.000) (CFP)

Accomplishments and honors

Championships
- 1x American (2025); 2x Sun Belt (2022–2023); 2x Sun Belt West Division (2022–2023)

Awards
- Sun Belt Coach of the Year (2022); Huntsville-Madison County Athletic Hall of Fame (2023)

Jonathan Edward Sumrall (born July 5, 1982) is an American college football coach who is the head football coach at the University of Florida. He previously served as the head coach at Troy University from 2022 to 2023 and Tulane University from 2024 to 2025.

== Early life and playing career ==
Sumrall was born on July 5, 1982 in Texarkana, Texas and was raised in Huntsville, Alabama where he attended Grissom High School, graduating in 2001. Sumrall played college football at the University of Kentucky as a linebacker, leading the team in tackles as a junior in 2004. Prior to his senior season he was diagnosed with a spinal condition that ended his playing career.

== Coaching career ==
=== Early Coaching Career ===
Sumrall began his coaching career as a graduate assistant at his alma mater, Kentucky, after medically retiring from football. After two years, he was hired by San Diego where he coached under former Kentucky assistant Ron Caragher. Sumrall then served as the co-defensive coordinator at Tulane for three seasons before going to Troy as their assistant head coach and special teams coordinator.

Sumrall was named the linebackers coach at Ole Miss in January 2018. He was also reported to be a finalist for the head coaching position at Troy in 2019 before Chip Lindsey was hired.

Sumrall returned to his alma mater Kentucky in 2019 as the program's inside linebackers coach. He was promoted to co-defensive coordinator in 2021.

=== Troy Trojans ===
On December 2, 2021, Sumrall was hired as the 23rd head coach at Troy University. In his first season at Troy, he guided the Trojans to a 12–2 record and an 18–12 Cure Bowl victory over the No. 23 ranked UTSA Roadrunners. In Sumrall's second season as the head coach he would guide Troy to a 11–2 record and back to back Sun Belt Conference Championships.

=== Tulane Green Wave ===
On December 8, 2023, Sumrall was hired as the 42nd head coach at Tulane. In Sumrall's two seasons with the Green Wave, he guided them to back-to-back American Conference Championship Game appearances (losing to Army in 2024 and defeating North Texas in 2025). Sumrall led Tulane to their first ever College Football Playoff appearance in 2025. Tulane earned the No. 11 seed in the expanded 12-team playoff after winning the American conference championship. Tulane lost 41-10 on the road against No. 6 seed Ole Miss on December 20, 2025.

=== Florida Gators ===
On November 30, 2025, it was reported that Florida was finalizing a six-year deal to hire Sumrall as its next head coach. He is reported to have an annual salary of $7.5 million a year with incentives tied to the College Football Playoff. Hours later, the University officially announced his hiring as the school's 31st head football coach. Sumrall coached Tulane's 2025 postseason game while also working to recruit and retain talent at Florida early in his tenure.

== Personal life ==
Sumrall and his wife, Ginny, have four children.

== Head coaching record ==
Year	Team	Overall	Conference	Standing	Bowl/playoffs	Coaches^{#}	AP^{°}
Troy Trojans (Sun Belt Conference) (2022–2023)
2022	Troy	12–2	7–1	T–1st (West)	W Cure	20	19
2023	Troy	11–2	7–1	1st (West)	Birmingham*		
Troy:		23–4	14–2	*Left for Tulane prior to bowl game			
Tulane Green Wave (American Athletic Conference / American Conference) (2024–2025)
2024	Tulane	9–5	7–1	2nd	L Gasparilla		
2025	Tulane	11–3	7–1	T–1st	L CFP First Round^{†}	18	18
Tulane:		20–8	14–2				
Florida Gators (Southeastern Conference) (2026–present)
2026	Florida	7–4	5–4				
Florida:		7–4	5–4				
Total:		50–16					
National championship Conference title Conference division title or championship game berth
