= Kimani Vidal =

American football player (born 2001)

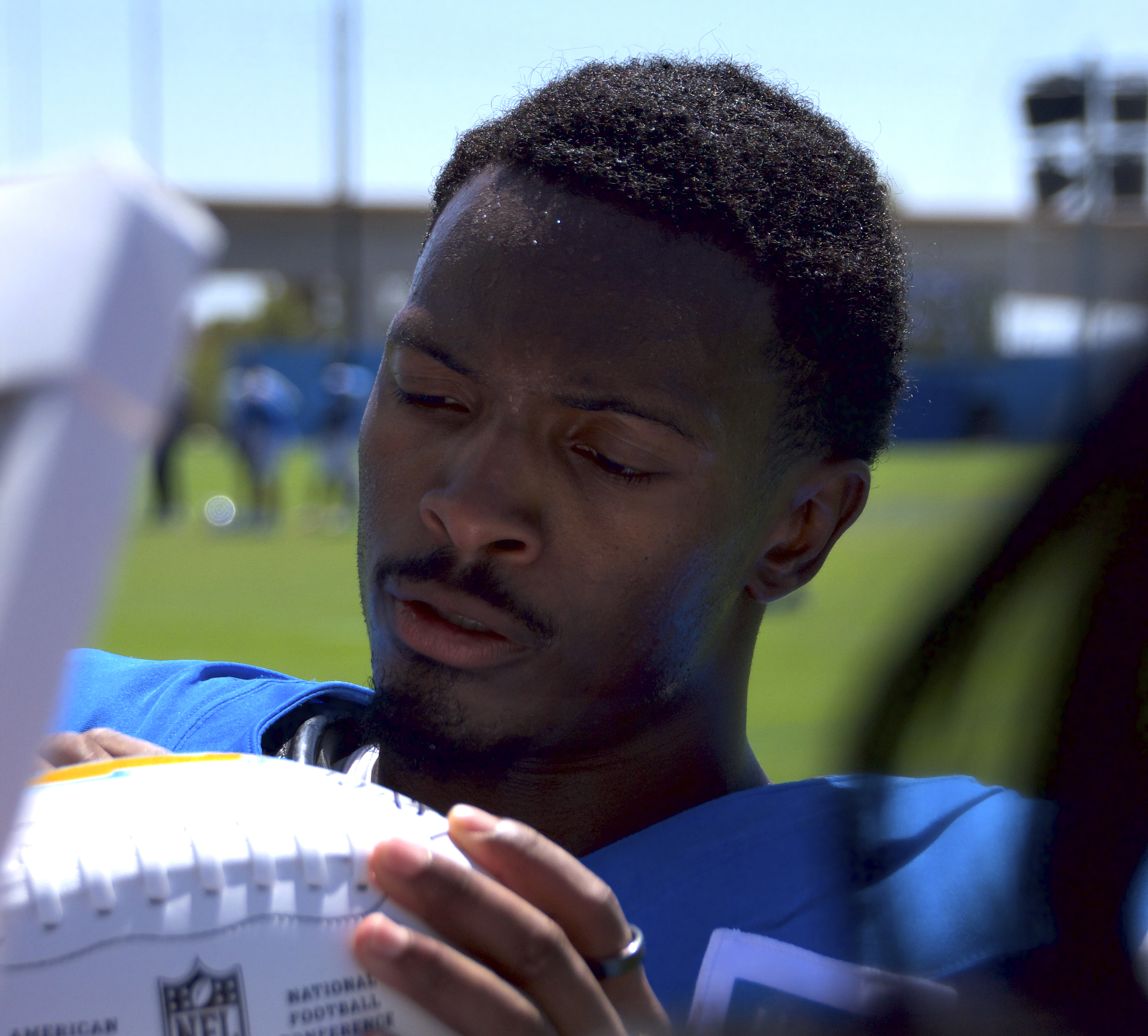
- Vidal with the Los Angeles Chargers in 2026

No. 28 – Los Angeles Chargers
- Position: Running back
- Roster status: Active

Personal information
- Born: August 28, 2001 (age 25); Atlanta, Georgia, U.S.
- Listed height: 5 ft 8 in (1.73 m)
- Listed weight: 215 lb (98 kg)

Career information
- High school: Marietta (Marietta, Georgia)
- College: Troy (2020–2023)
- NFL draft: 2024: 6th round, 181st overall pick

Career history
- Los Angeles Chargers (2024–present)

Awards and highlights
- Third-team All-American (2023); Sun Belt Offensive Player of the Year (2023); First-team All-Sun Belt (2023); Second-team All-Sun Belt (2022)

Career NFL statistics as of Week 5, 2026
- Rushing yards: 886
- Rushing average: 4.2
- Rushing touchdowns: 4
- Receptions: 25
- Receiving yards: 222
- Receiving touchdowns: 3
- Return yards: 356
- Stats at Pro Football Reference

Kimani Vidal (vi-DAHL; born August 28, 2001) is an American professional football running back for the Los Angeles Chargers of the National Football League (NFL). He played college football for the Troy Trojans and was selected by the Chargers in the sixth round of the 2024 NFL draft.

== Early life ==
Vidal was born in Atlanta to Kwame Vidal and Dayna Scott Vidal, the daughter of U.S. Representative David Scott (D-GA). He attended Marietta High School, where he was rated a three-star recruit. Vidal committed to play college football at Troy over offers from LSU, Memphis, South Alabama, South Carolina and Syracuse.

== College career ==
In week 5 of the 2020 season, Vidal rushed for 143 yards and a touchdown in a win over Eastern Kentucky. He finished his freshman season in 2020 with 101 carries for 516 yards and four touchdowns, while also hauling in 26 receptions for 225 yards.

In week 7 of the 2021 season, Vidal rushed for 162 yards and two touchdowns on 25 carries in a 31-28 win over Texas State. He finished the season with 701 yards and five touchdowns on 152 carries, while also bringing in 22 receptions for 134 yards.

In week 12 of the 2022 season, Vidal rushed for 242 yards and two touchdowns in a win over Louisiana–Monroe, earning Sun Belt Conference offensive player of the week honors. The following week, he rushed for 208 yards and four touchdowns to help beat Arkansas State and advance to the Sun Belt championship game. Vidal finished his breakout 2022 season with 1,132 yards and 10 touchdowns on 231 carries, while also notching 26 receptions for 140 yards. For his performance on the season, Vidal was named second-team all-Sun Belt.

In the 2023 season opener, Vidal set the Troy single game rushing yard record with 248 yards in a win over Stephen F. Austin. In week 6, he rushed for 245 yards and three touchdowns in a win over Arkansas State and was named the Sun Belt offensive player of the week. Vidal went on to be named the Sun Belt offensive player of the year and won the MVP award in the 2023 conference championship game after becoming the first player ever to rush for five touchdowns in an FBS conference championship.

== Professional career ==
Pre-draft measurables
Height	Weight	Arm length	Hand span	Wingspan	40-yard dash	10-yard split	20-yard split	20-yard shuttle	Three-cone drill	Vertical jump	Broad jump	Bench press
5 ft 7 7/8 in (1.72 m)	213 lb (97 kg)	30 3/8 in (0.77 m)	9 3/8 in (0.24 m)	6 ft 1 1/4 in (1.86 m)	4.46 s	1.53 s	2.59 s	4.15 s	7.01 s	37.5 in (0.95 m)	10 ft 0 in (3.05 m)	18 reps
All values from NFL Combine

Vidal was drafted by the Los Angeles Chargers with the 181st overall pick in the 2024 NFL draft. He made his NFL debut in a win over the Denver Broncos on October 13, scoring on his first official touch, a 38-yard touchdown reception from Justin Herbert.

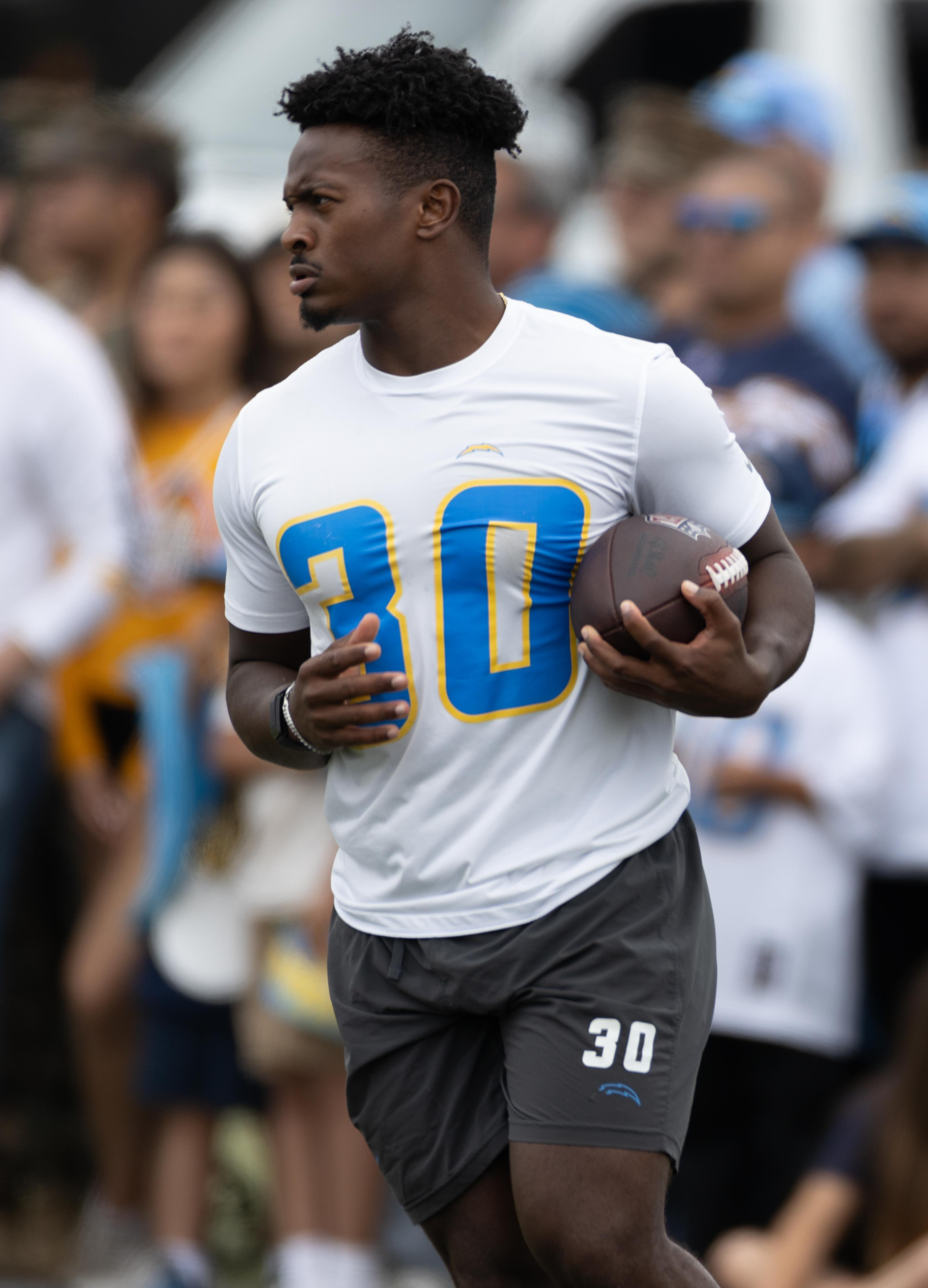
Vidal in 2024

Vidal was waived on August 26, 2025 as part of final roster cuts and re-signed to the practice squad the next day. He was promoted to the active roster on October 8 after Omarion Hampton was placed on injured reserve. In Week 6 against the Miami Dolphins, Vidal rushed 18 times for 124 yards, also hauling in three receptions for 14 yards and a touchdown.

== Career statistics ==
=== NFL ===
Legend
**Bold**	Career high

==== Regular season ====
Year	Team	Games		Rushing					Receiving					Kick returns					Fumbles	
Year	Team	GP	GS	Att	Yds	Avg	Lng	TD	Rec	Yds	Avg	Lng	TD	Ret	Yds	Avg	Lng	TD	Fum	Lost
2024	LAC	10	0	43	155	3.6	19	0	5	62	**12.4**	38	**1**	0	0	0.0	0	0	**1**	0
2025	LAC	**13**	**10**	**155**	**643**	**4.1**	**59**	**3**	**16**	**136**	8.5	**60**	**1**	**8**	177	22.1	**31**	0	**1**	0
2026	LAC	5	1	14	88	6.3	42	1	4	24	6.0	14	**1**	7	179	25.6	30	0	0	0
Career		28	11	212	886	4.3	59	4	25	222	8.9	60	3	15	356	23.7	31	0	2	0

==== Postseason ====
Year	Team	Games		Rushing					Receiving					Fumbles	
Year	Team	GP	GS	Att	Yds	Avg	Lng	TD	Rec	Yds	Avg	Lng	TD	Fum	Lost
2025	LAC	1	1	11	31	2.8	10	0	2	20	10.0	11	0	0	0
Career		1	1	11	31	2.8	10	0	2	20	10.0	11	0	0	0

=== College ===
Legend
	Led NCAA Division I FBS
	Sun Belt Offensive Player of the Year
	Troy record
**Bold**	Career best

Year	Team	Games		Rushing				Receiving			
Year	Team	GP	GS	Att	Yards	Avg	TD	Rec	Yards	Avg	TD
2020	Troy	9	2	101	516	5.1	4	**26**	**225**	8.7	0
2021	Troy	11	11	152	701	4.6	5	22	134	6.1	0
2022	Troy	**14**	**14**	231	1,132	4.9	10	**26**	140	5.4	0
2023	Troy	**14**	**14**	**297**	**1,661**	**5.6**	**14**	18	201	**11.2**	**1**
Career		48	41	781	4,010	5.1	33	92	700	7.6	1

== Personal life ==
Vidal has one sister, Kaylin. He is the grandson of former U.S. Representative David Scott and he is the great nephew of Hank Aaron, whose sister Alfredia is Vidal's grandmother.
