= 2023 Sun Belt Conference football season =

- League: NCAA Division I Football Bowl Subdivision
- Sport: Football
- Duration: August 31, 2023 – December 2, 2023
- Teams: 14

2024 NFL draft
- Top draft pick: RB Rasheen Ali, Marshall
- Picked by: Baltimore Ravens, 165th overall

Regular season
- Season MVP: QB Jordan McCloud, James Madison
- East champions: James Madison (Note: James Madison was ineligible to participate in the conference championship game due to FCS-to-FBS transition rules.)
- East runners-up: Appalachian State
- West champions: Troy

SBC Championship Game
- Date: December 2, 2023
- Venue: Veterans Memorial Stadium, Troy, Alabama
- Champions: Troy
- Runners-up: Appalachian State
- Finals MVP: RB Kimani Vidal, Troy

Seasons
- ← 2022 2024 →

2023 Sun Belt Conference football standings
	Conf.			Overall
Team	W		L	W		L
East Division
James Madison* x	7	–	1	11	–	2
Appalachian State y	6	–	2	9	–	5
Coastal Carolina	5	–	3	8	–	5
Old Dominion	5	–	3	6	–	7
Georgia State	3	–	5	7	–	6
Marshall	3	–	5	6	–	7
Georgia Southern	3	–	5	6	–	7
West Division
Troy xy$	7	–	1	11	–	3
Texas State	4	–	4	8	–	5
Arkansas State	4	–	4	6	–	7
South Alabama	4	–	4	7	–	6
Louisiana	3	–	5	6	–	7
Southern Miss	2	–	6	3	–	9
Louisiana–Monroe	0	–	8	2	–	10
Championship: Troy 49, Appalachian State 23
$ – Conference champion; x – Division champion/co-champions; y – Championship game participant; * – Ineligible for postseason play due to FCS-to-FBS transition rules

The 2023 Sun Belt Conference football season was the 23rd season of college football play for the Sun Belt Conference (SBC). The season began on August 31, 2023, and ended with its conference championship game on December 2, 2023. It was part of the 2023 NCAA Division I FBS football season. The conference consists of 14 member schools split into two divisions. The conference released its full season schedule on February 24, 2023.

== Preseason ==
=== Preseason Media Poll ===
The SBC released its preseason poll on July 24. James Madison was named the favorite to win the East Division, while Troy was named the favorite to win the West Division.

East
Predicted finish	Team	Votes (1st place)
1	James Madison	78 (4)
2	Appalachian State	75 (4)
3	Coastal Carolina	71 (3)
4	Marshall	68 (2)
5	Georgia Southern	52 (1)
6	Georgia State	31
7	Old Dominion	17

West
Predicted finish	Team	Votes (1st place)
1	Troy	92 (10)
2	South Alabama	85 (4)
3	Louisiana	64
4	Southern Miss	62
5	Texas State	36
6	Arkansas State	33
7	Louisiana–Monroe	20

=== Preseason All-Conference teams ===
- Offensive Player of the Year: Grayson McCall (Redshirt Senior, Coastal Carolina quarterback)
- Defensive Player of the Year: Jason Henderson, (Junior, Old Dominion linebacker)

Position	Player	Team
First Team Offense
QB	Grayson McCall	Coastal Carolina
RB	La'Damian Webb	South Alabama
RB	Frank Gore Jr.	Southern Miss
OL	Isaiah Helms	Appalachian State
OL	Khalil Crowder	Georgia Southern
OL	Travis Glover	Georgia State
OL	Nick Kidwell	James Madison
OL	Logan Osburn	Marshall
TE	Neal Johnson	Louisiana
WR	Jared Brown	Coastal Carolina
WR	Sam Pinckney	Coastal Carolina
WR	Khaleb Hood	Georgia Southern
First Team Defense
DL	James Carpenter	James Madison
DL	Owen Porter	Marshall
DL	TJ Jackson	Troy
DL	Richard Jibunor	Troy
LB	JT Killen	Coastal Carolina
LB	Marques Watson-Trent	Georgia Southern
LB	Eli Neal	Marshall
LB	Jason Henderson	Old Dominion
DB	Micah Abraham	Marshall
DB	Yam Banks	South Alabama
DB	Jay Stanley	South Alabama
DB	Reddy Steward	Troy
First Team Special Teams
K	Dominic Zvada	Arkansas State
P	Ryan Hanson	James Madison
RS	Milan Tucker	Appalachian State
AP	Frank Gore Jr.	Southern Miss

Position	Player	Team
Second Team Offense
QB	Carter Bradley	South Alabama
RB	Rasheen Ali	Marshall
RB	Kimani Vidal	Troy
OL	Damion Daley	Appalachian State
OL	Will McDonald	Coastal Carolina
OL	AJ Gillie	Louisiana
OL	Ethan Driskell	Marshall
OL	Daniel King	Troy
TE	Jiay Mcafee	Georgia Southern
WR	Tyrone Howell	Louisiana–Monroe
WR	Caullin Lacy	South Alabama
WR	Devin Voisin	South Alabama
Second Team Defense
DL	Javon Denis	Georgia State
DL	Wy'Kevious Thomas	South Alabama
DL	Jalen Williams	Southern Miss
DL	Jordan Revels	Texas State
DL	Javon Solomon	Troy
LB	Jontrey Hunter	Georgia State
LB	Jordan Veneziale	Georgia State
LB	Taurus Jones	James Madison
DB	Bryquice Brown	Georgia State
DB	Keith Gallmon Jr.	South Alabama
DB	Jaden Voisin	South Alabama
DB	Dell Pettus	Troy
Second Team Special Teams
K	Diego Guajardo	South Alabama
P	Ethan Duane	Old Dominion
RS	Matthew McDoom	Coastal Carolina
AP	Kimani Vidal	Troy

== Head coaches ==
- On November 27, 2022, Texas State announced that it had fired head coach Jake Spavital. Spavital had posted a record of 13–35 over four years at the school. On December 7, 2022, Texas State announced Incarnate Word's head coach G. J. Kinne would take over as the new head coach for the 2023 season.
- On December 4, 2022, Jamey Chadwell announced that he was leaving Coastal Carolina to take over the head coaching position at Liberty. Later on December 4, Coastal announced NC State offensive coordinator Tim Beck as the new head coach beginning in 2023.

Team	Head coach	Previous Job	Years at school	Overall record	Sun Belt record	Sun Belt titles
Appalachian State	Shawn Clark	Appalachian State (Off. Line Coach)	4	26–13 (.667)	16–8 (.667)	0
Arkansas State	Butch Jones	Alabama (assistant coach)	3	89–73 (.549)	2–14 (.125)	0
Coastal Carolina	Tim Beck	NC State (Off. Coordinator)	1	0–0 (–)	0–0 (–)	0
Georgia Southern	Clay Helton	USC	2	52–31 (.627)	3–5 (.375)	0
Georgia State	Shawn Elliott	South Carolina (Off. Line Coach)	7	35–43 (.449)	23–25 (.479)	0
James Madison	Curt Cignetti	Elon	5	108–34 (.761)	6–2 (.750)	0
Louisiana	Michael Desormeaux	Louisiana (Co-Off. Coordinator)	2	7–7 (.500)	4–4 (.500)	0
Louisiana–Monroe	Terry Bowden	Clemson (Grad. Assistant)	3	183–130–2 (.584)	5–11 (.313)	0
Marshall	Charles Huff	Alabama (Associate Head Coach)	3	16–10 (.615)	5–3 (.625)	0
Old Dominion	Ricky Rahne	Penn State (Off. Coordinator)	4	9–16 (.360)	2–6 (.250)	0
South Alabama	Kane Wommack	Indiana (Def. Coordinator)	3	15–10 (.600)	9–7 (.563)	0
Southern Miss	Will Hall	Tulane (Off. Coordinator)	2	66–35 (.653)	4–4 (.500)	0
Texas State	G. J. Kinne	Incarnate Word	2	16–10 (.615)	9–7 (.563)	0
Troy	Jon Sumrall	Kentucky (Co-Def. Coordinator)	2	12–2 (.857)	7–1 (.875)	1

=== Postseason changes ===
- On November 26, Louisiana–Monroe announced that it had fired head coach Terry Bowden after 3 seasons with the team. On December 5, the school announced that former UAB head coach Bryant Vincent would take over as the new head coach for 2024.
- On November 30, James Madison head coach Curt Cignetti announced that he would leave the school to take the head coach position at Indiana for the 2024 season. Assistant head coach and offensive line coach Damian Wroblewski was named the acting head coach for James Madison's bowl game. On December 7, the school announced that Bob Chesney would become the new head coach for 2024. Chesney had previously been head coach at Holy Cross.
- On December 8, Troy head coach Jon Sumrall was announced as the new head coach of Tulane in the American Athletic Conference for the 2024 season. The school's defensive coordinator Greg Gasparato was named the interim head coach. On December 18, Troy announced Gerad Parker as the new head coach for 2024. Parker was previously the offensive coordinator at Notre Dame.

== Rankings ==
		Pre	Wk 1	Wk 2	Wk 3	Wk 4	Wk 5	Wk 6	Wk 7	Wk 8	Wk 9	Wk 10	Wk 11	Wk 12	Wk 13	Wk 14	Final
Appalachian State	AP																
Appalachian State	C																
Appalachian State	CFP	Not released															
Arkansas State	AP																
Arkansas State	C																
Arkansas State	CFP	Not released															
Coastal Carolina	AP	RV															
Coastal Carolina	C																
Coastal Carolina	CFP	Not released															
Georgia Southern	AP																
Georgia Southern	C																
Georgia Southern	CFP	Not released															
Georgia State	AP																
Georgia State	C					RV											
Georgia State	CFP	Not released															
James Madison	AP	RV	RV	RV			RV	RV	RV	25	23	21	18	24	24	24	RV
James Madison	C	RV	RV	RV	RV	RV	RV	RV	RV	25	24	21	21	RV	25	25	RV
James Madison	CFP	Not released															
Louisiana	AP																
Louisiana	C																
Louisiana	CFP	Not released															
Louisiana–Monroe	AP																
Louisiana–Monroe	C																
Louisiana–Monroe	CFP	Not released															
Marshall	AP																
Marshall	C					RV	RV										
Marshall	CFP	Not released															
Old Dominion	AP																
Old Dominion	C																
Old Dominion	CFP	Not released															
South Alabama	AP	RV															
South Alabama	C	RV															
South Alabama	CFP	Not released															
Southern Miss	AP																
Southern Miss	C																
Southern Miss	CFP	Not released															
Texas State	AP		RV														
Texas State	C																
Texas State	CFP	Not released															
Troy	AP	RV	RV												RV	RV	RV
Troy	C	RV	RV									RV	RV	RV	RV	RV	RV
Troy	CFP	Not released															

== Schedule ==
The 2023 schedule was released on February 24, 2023.

Index to colors and formatting
Sun Belt member won
Sun Belt member lost
Sun Belt teams in **bold**

=== Week 1 ===
Date	Time	Visiting team	Home team	Site	TV	Result	Attendance	Ref.
August 31	6:00 p.m.	No. 21 (FCS) Rhode Island	**Georgia State**	Center Parc Stadium • Atlanta, GA	ESPN+	**W** 42–35	15,546	
September 2	11:00 a.m.	**Arkansas State**	No. 20 Oklahoma	Gaylord Family Oklahoma Memorial Stadium • Norman, OK	ESPN	**L** 0–73	83,221	
September 2	2:30 p.m.	No. 25 (FCS) Gardner-Webb	**Appalachian State**	Kidd Brewer Stadium • Boone, NC	ESPN+	**W** 45–24	36,075	
September 2	5:00 p.m.	The Citadel	**Georgia Southern**	Paulson Stadium • Statesboro, GA	ESPN+	**W** 34–0	17,803	
September 2	5:00 p.m.	Bucknell	**James Madison**	Bridgeforth Stadium • Harrisonburg, VA	ESPN+	**W** 38–3	23,756	
September 2	5:00 p.m.	Albany	**Marshall**	Joan C. Edwards Stadium • Huntington, WV	ESPN+	**W** 21–17	25,101	
September 2	6:00 p.m.	Army	**Louisiana–Monroe**	Malone Stadium • Monroe, LA	NFLN	**W** 17–13	18,914	
September 2	6:00 p.m.	Alcorn State	**Southern Miss**	M. M. Roberts Stadium • Hattiesburg, MS	ESPN+	**W** 40–14	30,335	
September 2	6:00 p.m.	**Texas State**	Baylor	McLane Stadium • Waco, TX	ESPN+	**W** 42–31	44,945	
September 2	6:00 p.m.	Stephen F. Austin	**Troy**	Veterans Memorial Stadium • Troy, AL	ESPN+	**W** 48–30	28,179	
September 2	6:30 p.m.	Northwestern State	**Louisiana**	Cajun Field • Lafayette, LA	ESPN+	**W** 38–13	18,186	
September 2	7:00 p.m.	**Old Dominion**	Virginia Tech	Lane Stadium • Blacksburg, VA	ACCN	**L** 17–36	65,632	
September 2	7:00 p.m.	**South Alabama**	No. 24 Tulane	Yulman Stadium • New Orleans, LA	ESPNU	**L** 17–37	26,973	
September 2	9:30 p.m.	**Coastal Carolina**	UCLA	Rose Bowl • Pasadena, CA	ESPN	**L** 13–27	43,705	
^{#}Rankings from AP Poll released prior to game. All times are in Central Time.

=== Week 2 ===
Date	Time	Visiting team	Home team	Site	TV	Result	Attendance	Ref.
September 9	11:00 a.m.	**James Madison**	Virginia	Scott Stadium • Charlottesville, VA	ESPNU	**W** 36–35	56,508	
September 9	11:00 a.m.	**Troy**	No. 15 Kansas State	Bill Snyder Family Football Stadium • Manhattan, KS	FS1	**L** 13–42	51,940	
September 9	2:30 p.m.	**Texas State**	UTSA	Alamodome • San Antonio, TX (I-35 Rivalry)	ESPN+	**L** 13–20	49,342	
September 9	3:00 p.m.	**Marshall**	East Carolina	Dowdy-Ficklen Stadium • Greenville, NC (rivalry)	ESPNU	**W** 31–13	38,211	
September 9	4:00 p.m.	No. 16 (FCS) Southeastern Louisiana	**South Alabama**	Hancock Whitney Stadium • Mobile, AL	ESPN+	**W** 35–17	15,237	
September 9	4:15 p.m.	**Appalachian State**	No. 17 North Carolina	Kenan Memorial Stadium • Chapel Hill, NC	ACCN	**L** 34–40 ^{2OT}	50,500	
September 9	5:00 p.m.	UAB	**Georgia Southern**	Paulson Stadium • Statesboro, GA	ESPN+	**W** 49–35	20,103	
September 9	5:00 p.m.	**Louisiana**	**Old Dominion**	S.B. Ballard Stadium • Norfolk, VA	ESPN+	**ODU** 38–31	18,154	
September 9	6:00 p.m.	Jacksonville State	**Coastal Carolina**	Brooks Stadium • Conway, SC	ESPN+	**W** 30–16	16,006	
September 9	6:00 p.m.	UConn	**Georgia State**	Center Parc Stadium • Atlanta, GA	ESPN+	**W** 35–14	15,186	
September 9	6:00 p.m.	Memphis	**Arkansas State**	Centennial Bank Stadium • Jonesboro, AR (Paint Bucket Bowl)	ESPN+	**L** 3–37	18,724	
September 9	7:00 p.m.	Lamar	**Louisiana–Monroe**	Malone Stadium • Monroe, LA	ESPN+	**W** 24–14	13,154	
September 9	7:30 p.m.	**Southern Miss**	No. 4 Florida State	Doak Campbell Stadium • Tallahassee, Florida	ACCN	**L** 13–66	74,467	
^{#}Rankings from AP Poll released prior to game. All times are in Central Time.

=== Week 3 ===
Date	Time	Visiting team	Home team	Site	TV	Result	Attendance	Ref.
September 16	11:00 a.m.	**Georgia Southern**	Wisconsin	Camp Randall Stadium • Madison, WI	BTN	**L** 14–35	75,610	
September 16	11:00 a.m.	Wake Forest	**Old Dominion**	S.B. Ballard Stadium • Norfolk, VA	ESPN2	**L** 24–27	18,276	
September 16	2:30 p.m.	East Carolina	**Appalachian State**	Kidd Brewer Stadium • Boone, NC	ESPN+	**W** 43–28	40,168	
September 16	3:00 p.m.	**Louisiana–Monroe**	Texas A&M	Kyle Field • College Station, TX	SECN	**L** 3–47	93,090	
September 16	3:00 p.m.	Tulane	**Southern Miss**	M. M. Roberts Stadium • Hattiesburg, MS (Battle for the Bell)	ESPNU	**L** 3–21	25,038	
September 16	5:00 p.m.	**Georgia State**	Charlotte	Jerry Richardson Stadium • Charlotte, NC	ESPN+	**W** 41–25	14,410	
September 16	6:00 p.m.	Duquesne	**Coastal Carolina**	Brooks Stadium • Conway, SC	ESPN+	**W** 66–7	18,116	
September 16	6:00 p.m.	Stony Brook	**Arkansas State**	Centennial Bank Stadium • Jonesboro, AR	ESPN+	**W** 31–7	14,327	
September 16	6:00 p.m.	**Louisiana**	UAB	Protective Stadium • Birmingham, AL	ESPN+	**W** 41–21	21,673	
September 16	6:00 p.m.	**South Alabama**	Oklahoma State	Boone Pickens Stadium • Stillwater, OK	ESPN+	**W** 33–7	53,855	
September 16	6:00 p.m.	**James Madison**	**Troy**	Veterans Memorial Stadium • Troy, AL	NFLN	**JMU** 16–14	26,634	
September 16	7:30 p.m.	Jackson State	**Texas State**	Bobcat Stadium • San Marcos, TX	ESPN+	**W** 77–34	24,118	
^{#}Rankings from AP Poll released prior to game. All times are in Central Time.

=== Week 4 ===
Date	Time	Visiting team	Home team	Site	TV	Result	Attendance	Ref.
September 21	6:30 p.m.	**Georgia State**	**Coastal Carolina**	Brooks Stadium • Conway, SC	ESPN	**GSU** 30–17	15,248	
September 23	11:00 a.m.	Western Kentucky	**Troy**	Veterans Memorial Stadium • Troy, AL	ESPNU	**W** 27–24	26,124	
September 23	11:00 a.m.	Virginia Tech	**Marshall**	Joan C. Edwards Stadium • Huntington, WV	ESPN2	**W** 24–17	31,475	
September 23	1:00 p.m.	**Georgia Southern**	Ball State	Scheumann Stadium • Muncie, IN	ESPN+	**W** 40–3	10,118	
September 23	2:30 p.m.	Texas A&M-Commerce	**Old Dominion**	S.B. Ballard Stadium • Norfolk, VA	ESPN+	**W** 10–9	16,938	
September 23	4:00 p.m.	Central Michigan	**South Alabama**	Hancock Whitney Stadium • Mobile, AL	ESPN+	**L** 30–34	18,369	
September 23	6:00 p.m.	**Appalachian State**	Wyoming	War Memorial Stadium • Laramie, WY	CBSSN	**L** 19–22	21,169	
September 23	6:00 p.m.	**Southern Miss**	**Arkansas State**	Centennial Bank Stadium • Jonesboro, AR	ESPN+	**ARKST** 44–37	16,601	
September 23	6:00 p.m.	Nevada	**Texas State**	Bobcats Stadium • San Marcos, TX	ESPN+	**W** 35–24	19,257	
September 23	6:30 p.m.	Buffalo	**Louisiana**	Cajun Field • Lafayette, LA	ESPN+	**W** 45–38	17,674	
September 23	7:00 p.m.	**James Madison**	Utah State	Maverik Stadium • Logan, UT		**W** 45–38	19,994	
^{#}Rankings from AP Poll released prior to game. All times are in Central Time.

=== Week 5 ===
Date	Time	Visiting team	Home team	Site	TV	Result	Attendance	Ref.
September 30	11:00 a.m.	Louisiana	Minnesota	Huntington Bank Stadium • Minneapolis, MN	BTN	**L** 24–35	46,843	
September 30	11:00 a.m.	South Alabama	**James Madison**	Bridgeforth Stadium • Harrisonburg, VA	ESPNU	**JMU** 31–23	26,064	
September 30	2:30 p.m.	Arkansas State	UMass	Warren McGuirk Alumni Stadium • Hadley, MA	ESPN+	**W** 52–28	9,494	
September 30	2:30 p.m.	Old Dominion	**Marshall**	Joan C. Edwards Stadium • Huntington, WV	ESPN+	**MU** 41–35	22,652	
September 30	6:00 p.m.	Coastal Carolina	**Georgia Southern**	Paulson Stadium • Statesboro, GA	NFLN	**GASO** 38–28	26,483	
September 30	6:00 p.m.	Troy	**Georgia State**	Center Parc Stadium • Atlanta, GA	ESPN+	**TROY** 28–7	16,536	
September 30	6:00 p.m.	Texas State	**Southern Miss**	M. M. Roberts Stadium • Hattiesburg, MS	ESPN+	**TXST** 50–36	21,304	
September 30	7:00 p.m.	Appalachian State	**Louisiana–Monroe**	Malone Stadium • Monroe, LA	ESPN+	**APPST** 41–40	19,919	
^{#}Rankings from AP Poll released prior to game. All times are in Central Time.

=== Week 6 ===
Date	Time	Visiting team	Home team	Site	TV	Result	Attendance	Ref.
October 7	1:00 p.m.	**Marshall**	NC State	Carter–Finley Stadium • Raleigh, NC	CW	**L** 41–48	56,919	
October 7	2:30 p.m.	**Texas State**	**Louisiana**	Cajun Field • Lafayette, LA	ESPNU	**ULL** 34–30	15,053	
October 7	3:00 p.m.	**Arkansas State**	**Troy**	Veterans Memorial Stadium • Troy, AL	ESPN+	**TROY** 37–3	26,957	
October 7	6:00 p.m.	**South Alabama**	**Louisiana–Monroe**	Malone Stadium • Monroe, LA	ESPN+	**SOAL** 55–7	12,099	
October 7	6:00 p.m.	**Old Dominion**	**Southern Miss**	M. M. Roberts Stadium • Hattiesburg, MS	ESPN+	**ODU** 17–13	22,652	
^{#}Rankings from AP Poll released prior to game. All times are in Central Time.

=== Week 7 ===
Date	Time	Visiting team	Home team	Site	TV	Result	Attendance	Ref.
October 10	6:30 p.m.	**Coastal Carolina**	**Appalachian State**	Kidd Brewer Stadium • Boone, NC	ESPN2	**CCU** 27–24	34,252	
October 14	11:00 a.m.	**Georgia Southern**	**James Madison**	Bridgeforth Stadium • Harrisonburg, VA	ESPN2	**JMU** 41–13	25,097	
October 14	2:30 p.m.	**Troy**	Army	Michie Stadium • West Point, NY	CBSSN	**W** 19–0	27,829	
October 14	6:00 p.m.	**Marshall**	**Georgia State**	Center Parc Stadium • Atlanta, GA	ESPN2	**GSU** 41–24	16,718	
October 14	6:00 p.m.	**Louisiana–Monroe**	**Texas State**	Bobcat Stadium • San Marcos, TX	ESPN+	**TXST** 21–20	27,537	
^{#}Rankings from AP Poll released prior to game. All times are in Central Time.

=== Week 8 ===
Date	Time	Visiting team	Home team	Site	TV	Result	Attendance	Ref.
October 17	6:30 p.m.	Southern Miss	South Alabama	Hancock Whitney Stadium • Mobile, AL	ESPN2	**SOAL** 55–3	23,478	
October 19	6:00 p.m.	James Madison	Marshall	Joan C. Edwards Stadium • Huntington, WV	ESPN	**JMU** 20–9	22,109	
October 21	1:00 p.m.	Louisiana–Monroe	Georgia Southern	Paulson Stadium • Statesboro, GA	ESPN+	**GASO** 38–28	21,068	
October 21	6:00 p.m.	Appalachian State	Old Dominion	S.B. Ballard Stadium • Norfolk, VA (Oyster Bowl)	NFLN	**ODU** 28–21	20,017	
October 21	6:00 p.m.	Coastal Carolina	Arkansas State	Centennial Bank Stadium • Jonesboro, AR	ESPN+	**CCU** 27–17	18,228	
October 21	7:00 p.m.	Georgia State	Louisiana	Cajun Field • Lafayette, LA	ESPNU	**GSU** 20–17	20,044	
^{#}Rankings from AP Poll released prior to game. All times are in Central Time.

=== Week 9 ===
Date	Time	Visiting team	Home team	Site	TV	Result	Attendance	Ref.
October 26	6:30 p.m.	Georgia State	**Georgia Southern**	Paulson Stadium • Statesboro, GA (Modern Day Hate)	ESPN2	**GASO** 44–27	23,389	
October 28	2:30 p.m.	Southern Miss	**Appalachian State**	Kidd Brewer Stadium • Boone, NC	ESPN+	**APPST** 48–38	32,601	
October 28	4:00 p.m.	Arkansas State	**Louisiana–Monroe**	Malone Stadium • Monroe, LA	ESPN+	**ARKST** 34–24	14,006	
October 28	4:00 p.m.	Louisiana	**South Alabama**	Hancock Whitney Stadium • Mobile, AL	ESPN+	**ULL** 33–20	16,709	
October 28	5:00 p.m.	Marshall	**Coastal Carolina**	Brooks Stadium • Conway, SC	NFLN	**CCU** 34–6	21,324	
October 28	6:00 p.m.	Troy	**Texas State**	Bobcat Stadium • San Marcos, TX	ESPN+	**TROY** 31–13	22,369	
October 28	7:00 p.m.	Old Dominion	No. 25 **James Madison**	Bridgeforth Stadium • Harrisonburg, VA (Royal Rivalry)	ESPNU	**JMU** 30–27	26,239	
^{#}Rankings from AP Poll released prior to game. All times are in Central Time.

=== Week 10 ===
Date	Time	Visiting team	Home team	Site	TV	Result	Attendance	Ref.
November 2	6:30 p.m.	South Alabama	Troy	Veterans Memorial Stadium • Troy, AL (Battle for the Belt)	ESPN2	**TROY** 28–10	28,212	
November 4	2:00 p.m.	Louisiana	Arkansas State	Centennial Bank Stadium • Jonesboro, AR	ESPN+	**ARKST** 37–17	15,881	
November 4	2:30 p.m.	James Madison	Georgia State	Center Parc Stadium • Atlanta, GA	ESPN2	**JMU** 42–14	15,320	
November 4	2:30 p.m.	Coastal Carolina	Old Dominion	S.B. Ballard Stadium • Norfolk, VA	ESPN+	**CCU** 28–24	17,982	
November 4	3:00 p.m.	Louisiana–Monroe	Southern Miss	M. M. Roberts Stadium • Hattiesburg, MS	ESPN+	**USM** 24–7	20,193	
November 4	4:00 p.m.	Georgia Southern	Texas State	Bobcat Stadium • San Marcos, TX	ESPN+	**TXST** 45–24	18.204	
November 4	5:00 p.m.	Marshall	Appalachian State	Kidd Brewer Stadium • Boone, NC (The Old Mountain Feud)	NFLN	**APPST** 31–9	34,057	
^{#}Rankings from College Football Playoff. All times are in Central Time.

=== Week 11 ===
Date	Time	Visiting team	Home team	Site	TV	Result	Attendance	Ref.
November 9	6:30 p.m.	**Southern Miss**	**Louisiana**	Cajun Field • Lafayette, LA	ESPNU	**USM** 34–31 ^{OT}	15,137	
November 11	12:00 p.m.	**Old Dominion**	Liberty	Williams Stadium • Lynchburg, VA	ESPN+	**L** 10–38	21,481	
November 11	1:00 p.m.	UConn	**James Madison**	Bridgeforth Stadium • Harrisonburg, VA	ESPN+	**W** 44–6	25,240	
November 11	1:00 p.m.	**Appalachian State**	**Georgia State**	Center Parc Stadium • Atlanta, GA	ESPN+	**APPST** 42–14	14,260	
November 11	1:00 p.m.	**Troy**	**Louisiana–Monroe**	Malone Stadium • Monroe, LA	ESPN+	**TROY** 45–14	7,683	
November 11	2:30 p.m.	**Texas State**	**Coastal Carolina**	Brooks Stadium • Conway, SC	ESPN+	**CCU** 31–23	15,832	
November 11	4:00 p.m.	**Arkansas State**	**South Alabama**	Hancock Whitney Stadium • Mobile, AL	ESPN+	**SOAL** 21–14	15,242	
November 11	6:00 p.m.	**Georgia Southern**	**Marshall**	Joan C. Edwards Stadium • Huntington, WV	NFLN	**MU** 38–33	19,175	
^{#}Rankings from College Football Playoff. All times are in Central Time.

=== Week 12 ===
Date	Time	Visiting team	Home team	Site	TV	Result	Attendance	Ref.
November 18	11:00 a.m.	Louisiana–Monroe	No. 13 Ole Miss	Vaught–Hemingway Stadium • University, MS	SECN	**L** 3–35	60,752	
November 18	11:00 a.m.	Coastal Carolina	Army	Michie Stadium • West Point, NY	CBSSN	**L** 21–28	26,867	
November 18	11:00 a.m.	Southern Miss	Mississippi State	Davis Wade Stadium • Mississippi State, MS	SECN+/ESPN+	**L** 20–41	53,855	
November 18	1:00 p.m.	Appalachian State	**James Madison**	Bridgeforth Stadium • Harrisonburg, VA	ESPN+	**APPST** 26–23 ^{OT}	25,838	
November 18	2:00 p.m.	Texas State	**Arkansas State**	Centennial Bank Stadium • Jonesboro, AR	ESPN+	**ARKST** 77–31	16,721	
November 18	2:30 p.m.	Louisiana	**Troy**	Veterans Memorial Stadium • Troy, AL	NFLN	**TROY** 31–24	26,621	
November 18	4:00 p.m.	Marshall	**South Alabama**	Hancock Whitney Stadium • Mobile, AL	ESPN+	**SOAL** 28–0	14,105	
November 18	5:00 p.m.	Old Dominion	**Georgia Southern**	Paulson Stadium • Statesboro, GA	ESPN+	**ODU** 20–17	20,032	
November 18	7:00 p.m.	Georgia State	No. 15 LSU	Tiger Stadium • Baton Rouge, LA	EPSN2	**L** 14–56	100,212	
^{#}Rankings from College Football Playoff. All times are in Central Time.

=== Week 13 ===
Date	Time	Visiting team	Home team	Site	TV	Result	Attendance	Ref.
November 25	11:00 a.m.	Troy	Southern Miss	M. M. Roberts Stadium • Hattiesburg, MS	ESPNU	**TROY** 35–17	19,766	
November 25	1:00 p.m.	Georgia State	Old Dominion	S.B. Ballard Stadium • Norfolk, VA	ESPN+	**ODU** 25–24	15,717	
November 25	1:00 p.m.	Louisiana–Monroe	Louisiana	Cajun Field • Lafayette, LA (Battle on the Bayou)	ESPN+	**ULL** 52–21	13,892	
November 25	2:30 p.m.	Georgia Southern	Appalachian State	Kidd Brewer Stadium • Boone, NC (rivalry)	ESPNU	**APPST** 55–27	31,248	
November 25	2:30 p.m.	James Madison	Coastal Carolina	Brooks Stadium • Conway, SC	ESPN2	**JMU** 56–14	16,196	
November 25	2:30 p.m.	Arkansas State	Marshall	Joan C. Edwards Stadium • Huntington, WV	ESPN+	**MU** 35–21	18,673	
November 25	6:00 p.m.	South Alabama	Texas State	Bobcat Stadium • San Marcos, TX	NFLN	**TXST** 52–44	15,617	
^{#}Rankings from College Football Playoff. All times are in Central Time.

=== Championship Game ===
Date	Time	Visiting team	Home team	Site	TV	Result	Attendance	Ref.
December 2	3:00 pm	**Appalachian State**	**Troy**	Veterans Memorial Stadium • Troy, AL (Sun Belt Conference Championship Game)	ESPN	**TROY** 49–23	20,183	
^{#}Rankings from College Football Playoff. All times are in Central Time.

== Postseason ==
=== Bowl Games ===
Legend
Sun Belt win
Sun Belt loss

Bowl game	Date	Site	Television	Time (CST)	Sun Belt team	Opponent	Score	Attendance
Myrtle Beach Bowl	December 16	Brooks Stadium • Conway, SC	ESPN	10:00 a.m.	Georgia Southern	Ohio	L 21–41	8,059
New Orleans Bowl	December 16	Caesars Superdome • New Orleans, LA	ESPN	1:15 p.m.	Louisiana	Jacksonville State	L 31–34^{OT}	14,485
Cure Bowl	December 16	FBC Mortgage Stadium • Orlando, FL	ABC	2:30 p.m.	Appalachian State	Miami (OH)	W 13–9	11,121
Famous Toastery Bowl	December 18	Jerry Richardson Stadium • Charlotte, NC	ESPN	1:30 p.m.	Old Dominion	Western Kentucky	L 35–38^{OT}	5,632
Frisco Bowl	December 19	Toyota Stadium • Frisco, TX	ESPN	8:00 p.m.	Marshall	UTSA	L 17–35	11,215
Birmingham Bowl	December 23	Protective Stadium • Birmingham, AL	ABC	11:00 a.m.	Troy	Duke	L 10–17	20,023
Camellia Bowl	December 23	Cramton Bowl • Montgomery, AL	ESPN	11:00 a.m.	Arkansas State	Northern Illinois	L 19–21	11,310
Armed Forces Bowl	December 23	Amon G. Carter Stadium • Fort Worth, TX	ABC	2:30 p.m.	James Madison	Air Force	L 21–31	30,828
Famous Idaho Potato Bowl	December 23	Albertsons Stadium • Boise, ID	ESPN	2:30 p.m.	Georgia State	Utah State	W 45–22	12,168
68 Ventures Bowl	December 23	Hancock Whitney Stadium • Mobile, AL	ESPN	6:00 p.m.	South Alabama	Eastern Michigan	W 59–10	20,926
Hawaii Bowl	December 23	Clarence T. C. Ching Athletics Complex • Honolulu, HI	ESPN	9:30 p.m.	Coastal Carolina	San Jose State	W 24–14	7,089
First Responder Bowl	December 26	Gerald J. Ford Stadium • University Park, TX	ESPN	4:30 p.m.	Texas State	Rice	W 45–21	26,542

Rankings are from Final CFP rankings. All times Central Time Zone.

=== Selection of teams ===
- Bowl eligible (12): Appalachian State, Arkansas State, Coastal Carolina, Georgia Southern, Georgia State, James Madison, (Note: Due to a lack of bowl eligible teams, James Madison was deemed bowl eligible despite its two-year postseason ban during its transition from FCS to FBS.) Louisiana, Marshall, Old Dominion, South Alabama, Texas State, Troy
- Bowl ineligible (2): Louisiana–Monroe, Southern Miss

== Sun Belt records vs other conferences ==
2023–2024 records against non-conference foes:

Power Conferences 5	Record
ACC	2–5
Big Ten	0–2
Big 12	2–2
Pac-12	0–1
Notre Dame	0–0
SEC	0–4
Power 5 Total	4–15
Other FBS Conferences	Record
American	5–4
C-USA	2–1
Independents (Excluding Notre Dame)	5–1
MAC	2–1
Mountain West	2–1
Other FBS Total	16–8
FCS Opponents	Record
Football Championship Subdivision	14–0
Total Non-Conference Record	34–22

Postseason

Power Five Conferences	Record
ACC	0–1
Big 12	0–0
Big Ten	0–0
Notre Dame	0–0
Pac-12	0–0
SEC	0–0
Power 5 Total	0–1
Other FBS Conferences	Record
American	1–1
C–USA	0–2
Independents (Excluding Notre Dame)	0–0
MAC	2–2
Mountain West	2–1
Other FBS Total	5–6
Total Bowl Record	5–7

=== Sun Belt vs Power 5 matchups ===
This is a list of games the Sun Belt has scheduled versus power conference teams (ACC, Big 10, Big 12, Pac-12, Notre Dame and SEC). All rankings are from the current AP Poll at the time of the game.

Date	Conference	Visitor	Home	Site	Score
September 2	Pac-12	Coastal Carolina	UCLA	Rose Bowl • Pasadena, CA	L 13–27
September 2	ACC	Old Dominion	Virginia Tech	Lane Stadium • Blacksburg, VA	L 17–36
September 2	Big 12	Arkansas State	No. 20 Oklahoma	Gaylord Family Oklahoma Memorial Stadium • Norman, OK	L 0–73
September 2	Big 12	Texas State	Baylor	McLane Stadium • Waco, TX	W 42–31
September 9	ACC	Appalachian State	No. 17 North Carolina	Kenan Memorial Stadium • Chapel Hill, NC	L 34–40 ^{2OT}
September 9	ACC	James Madison	Virginia	Scott Stadium • Charlottesville, VA	W 36–35
September 9	ACC	Southern Miss	No. 4 Florida State	Doak Campbell Stadium • Tallahassee, FL	L 13–66
September 9	Big 12	Troy	No. 15 Kansas State	Bill Snyder Family Football Stadium • Manhattan, KS	L 13–42
September 16	Big Ten	Georgia Southern	Wisconsin	Camp Randall Stadium • Madison, WI	L 14–35
September 16	ACC	Wake Forest	Old Dominion	S.B. Ballard Stadium • Norfolk, VA	L 24–27
September 16	SEC	Louisiana–Monroe	Texas A&M	Kyle Field • College Station, TX	L 3–47
September 16	Big 12	South Alabama	Oklahoma State	Boone Pickens Stadium • Stillwater, OK	W 33–7
September 23	ACC	Virginia Tech	Marshall	Joan C. Edwards Stadium • Huntington, WV	W 24–17
September 30	Big Ten	Louisiana	Minnesota	Huntington Bank Stadium • Minneapolis, MN	L 24–35
October 7	ACC	Marshall	NC State	Carter–Finley Stadium • Raleigh, NC	L 41–48
November 18	SEC	Georgia State	No. 15 LSU	Tiger Stadium • Baton Rouge, LA	L 14–56
November 18	SEC	Louisiana–Monroe	No. 13 Ole Miss	Vaught–Hemingway Stadium • Oxford, MS	L 3–35
November 18	SEC	Southern Miss	Mississippi State	Davis Wade Stadium • Starkville, MS	L 20–41

=== Sun Belt vs Group of Five matchups ===
The following games include Sun Belt teams competing against teams from the American, C-USA, MAC, or Mountain West.

Date	Conference	Visitor	Home	Site	Score
September 2	American	South Alabama	No. 24 Tulane	Yulman Stadium • New Orleans, LA	L 17–37
September 9	C-USA	Jacksonville State	Coastal Carolina	Brooks Stadium • Conway, SC	W 30–16
September 9	American	UAB	Georgia Southern	Paulson Stadium • Statesboro, GA	W 49–35
September 9	American	Marshall	East Carolina	Dowdy-Ficklen Stadium • Greenville, NC	W 31–13
September 9	American	Memphis	Arkansas State	Centennial Bank Stadium • Jonesboro, AR	L 3–37
September 9	American	Texas State	UTSA	Alamodome • San Antonio, TX	L 13–20
September 16	American	East Carolina	Appalachian State	Kidd Brewer Stadium • Boone, NC	W 43–28
September 16	American	Georgia State	Charlotte	Jerry Richardson Stadium • Charlotte, NC	W 41–25
September 16	American	Louisiana	UAB	Protective Stadium • Birmingham, AL	W 41–21
September 16	American	Tulane	Southern Miss	M. M. Roberts Stadium • Hattiesburg, MS	L 3–21
September 23	Mountain West	Appalachian State	Wyoming	War Memorial Stadium • Laramie, WY	L 19–22
September 23	MAC	Georgia Southern	Ball State	Scheumann Stadium • Muncie, IN	W 40–3
September 23	Mountain West	James Madison	Utah State	Maverik Stadium • Logan, UT	W 45–38
September 23	MAC	Buffalo	Louisiana	Cajun Field • Lafayette, LA	W 45–38
September 23	MAC	Central Michigan	South Alabama	Hancock Whitney Stadium • Mobile, AL	L 30–34
September 23	Mountain West	Nevada	Texas State	Bobcat Stadium • San Marcos, TX	W 35–24
September 23	C-USA	Western Kentucky	Troy	Veterans Memorial Stadium • Troy, AL	W 27–24
November 11	C-USA	Old Dominion	Liberty	Williams Stadium • Lynchburg, VA	L 10–38

=== Sun Belt vs FBS independents matchups ===
The following games include Sun Belt teams competing against FBS Independents, which includes Army, UConn, or UMass.

Date	Visitor	Home	Site	Score
September 2	Army	Louisiana–Monroe	Malone Stadium • Monroe, LA	W 17–13
September 9	UConn	Georgia State	Center Parc Stadium • Atlanta, GA	W 35–14
September 30	Arkansas State	UMass	Warren McGuirk Alumni Stadium • Hadley, MA	W 52–28
October 14	Troy	Army	Michie Stadium • West Point, NY	W 19–0
November 11	UConn	James Madison	Bridgeforth Stadium • Harrisonburg, VA	W 44–6
November 18	Coastal Carolina	Army	Michie Stadium • West Point, NY	L 21–28

=== Sun Belt vs FCS matchups ===
Date	Visitor	Home	Site	Score
August 31	Rhode Island	Georgia State	Center Parc Stadium • Atlanta, GA	W 42–35
September 2	Gardner-Webb	Appalachian State	Kidd Brewer Stadium • Boone, NC	W 45–24
September 2	The Citadel	Georgia Southern	Paulson Stadium • Statesboro, GA	W 34–0
September 2	Bucknell	James Madison	Bridgeforth Stadium • Harrisonburg, VA	W 38–3
September 2	Albany	Marshall	Joan C. Edwards Stadium • Huntington, WV	W 21–17
September 2	Northwestern State	Louisiana	Cajun Field • Lafayette, LA	W 38–13
September 2	Alcorn State	Southern Miss	M. M. Roberts Stadium • Hattiesburg, MS	W 40–14
September 2	Stephen F. Austin	Troy	Veterans Memorial Stadium • Troy, AL	W 48–30
September 9	Lamar	Louisiana–Monroe	Malone Stadium • Monroe, LA	W 24–14
September 9	Southeastern Louisiana	South Alabama	Hancock Whitney Stadium • Mobile, AL	W 35–17
September 16	Duquesne	Coastal Carolina	Brooks Stadium • Conway, SC	W 66–7
September 16	Stony Brook	Arkansas State	Centennial Bank Stadium • Jonesboro, AR	W 31–7
September 16	Jackson State	Texas State	Bobcat Stadium • San Marcos, TX	W 77–34
September 23	Texas A&M-Commerce	Old Dominion	S.B. Ballard Stadium • Norfolk, VA	W 10–9

== Home game attendance ==
Team	Stadium	Capacity	Game 1	Game 2	Game 3	Game 4	Game 5	Game 6	Total	Average	% of Capacity
Appalachian State	Kidd Brewer Stadium	30,000	**36,075**	**40,168**	**34,252**				110,495	**36,832**	122.7%
Arkansas State	Centennial Bank Stadium	30,406	18,724	14,327	16,601	18,228			67,880	16,970	55.8%
Coastal Carolina	Brooks Stadium	21,000	16,006	18,116	15,248				49,370	16,457	78.3%
Georgia Southern	Paulson Stadium	25,000	17,803	20,103	**26,483**	21,068			85,457	21,364	85.4%
Georgia State	Center Parc Stadium	24,333	15,546	15,186	16,536	16,718			63,986	15,997	65.7%
James Madison	Bridgeforth Stadium	24,877	23,756	**26,064**	**25,097**				74,917	**24,972**	100.3%
Louisiana	Cajun Field	41,426	18,186	17,674	15,053	20,044			70,957	17,739	42.8%
Louisiana–Monroe	Malone Stadium	27,617	18,914	13,154	19,919	12,099			64,086	16,022	58.0%
Marshall	Joan C. Edwards Stadium	38,227	25,101	31,475	22,652	22,109			100,337	25,084	65.26
Old Dominion	S. B. Ballard Stadium	21,944	18,154	18,276	16,938	20,017			73,385	18,346	83.6%
South Alabama	Hancock Whitney Stadium	25,450	15,237	18,369	23,478				57,084	19,028	74.7%
Southern Miss	M. M. Roberts Stadium	36,000	30,335	25,038	21,304	22,652			99,329	24,832	68.9%
Texas State	Jim Wacker Field at Bobcat Stadium	30,008	24,118	19,257	27,537				70,912	23,637	78.7%
Troy	Veterans Memorial Stadium	30,470	28,179	26,634	26,124	26,957			107,894	26,974	88.5%

Bold – At or Exceeded capacity
†Season High

== Awards and honors ==
=== Player of the week honors ===
Week	Offensive			Defensive			Special Teams		
Week	Player	Team	Position	Player	Team	Position	Player	Team	Position
Week 1	T. J. Finley	Texas State	QB	Clayton Isbell	Coastal Carolina	S	Andrew Stein	Southern Miss	K
Week 2	Davis Brin	Georgia Southern	QB	Jason Henderson	Old Dominion	LB	Aiden Fisher	James Madison	LB
Week 3	Darren Grainger	Georgia State	QB	LaMareon James	Old Dominion	CB	Camden Wise	James Madison	K
Week 4	Rasheen Ali	Marshall	RB	Brian Holloway	Texas State	LB	Dominic Zvada	Arkansas State	K
Week 5	Jaylen Raynor	Arkansas State	QB	Marques Watson-Trent	Georgia Southern	LB	Michael Hughes	Appalachian State	K
Week 6	Kimani Vidal	Troy	RB	Jason Henderson (2)	Old Dominion	LB	Dalen Cambre	Louisiana	WR
Week 7	Grayson McCall	Coastal Carolina	QB	Richard Jibunor	Troy	LB	Scott Taylor Renfroe	Troy	K
Week 8	Jalen White	Georgia Southern	RB	Jalen Green	James Madison	DL	Ryan Hanson	James Madison	P
Week 9	Gunnar Watson	Troy	QB	Cameron Whitfield	Louisiana	LB	Michael Lantz	Georgia Southern	K
Week 10	Jordan McCloud	James Madison	QB	Jason Henderson (3)	Old Dominion	LB	Dominic Zvada (2)	Arkansas State	K
Week 11	Jordan McCloud (2)	James Madison	QB	Javon Solomon	Troy	LB	Jayden Harrison	Marshall	WR
Week 12	Ja'Quez Cross	Arkansas State	RB	Ethan Johnson	Appalachian State	CB	Ja'Quez Cross	Arkansas State	RB
Week 13	Jordan McCloud (3)	James Madison	QB	Tyrek Funderburk	Appalachian State	CB	Kole Wilson	Texas State	WR

=== Sun Belt individual awards ===
The following individuals received postseason honors as voted by the Sun Belt Conference football coaches at the end of the season.

Award	Player	School
Player of the Year	Jordan McCloud	James Madison
Offensive Player of the Year	Kimani Vidal	Troy
Defensive Player of the Year	Jalen Green	James Madison
Freshman Player of the Year	Jaylen Raynor	Arkansas State
Newcomer of the Year	Joey Aguilar	Appalachian State
Coach of the Year	Curt Cignetti	James Madison

=== All-Conference teams ===
The following players were selected as part of the Sun Belt's All-Conference Teams.

Position	Player	Team
First Team Offense
WR	Reggie Brown	James Madison
WR	Elijah Sarratt	James Madison
WR	Caullin Lacy	South Alabama
OL	Isaiah Helms	Appalachian State
OL	Bucky Williams	Appalachian State
OL	Jacob Bayer	Arkansas State
OL	Khalil Crowder	Georgia Southern
OL	Travis Glover	Georgia State
TE	Zach Horton	James Madison
QB	Jordan McCloud	James Madison
RB	Marcus Carroll	Georgia State
RB	Kimani Vidal	Troy
First Team Defense
DL	Jalen Green	James Madison
DL	Jamree Kromah	James Madison
DL	Owen Porter	Marshall
DL	Richard Jibunor	Troy
DL	Javon Solomon	Troy
LB	Andrew Parker Jr.	Appalachian State
LB	Marques Watson-Trent	Georgia Southern
LB	Jason Henderson	Old Dominion
DB	Tyrek Funderburk	Appalachian State
DB	Micah Abraham	Marshall
DB	Jaden Voisin	South Alabama
DB	Reddy Steward	Troy
First Team Specialists
K	Mason Shipley	Texas State
P	William Przystup	Arkansas State
RS	Jayden Harrison	Marshall
AP	Ismail Mahdi	Texas State

Position	Player	Team
Second Team Offense
WR	Sam Pinckney	Coastal Carolina
WR	Khaleb Hood	Georgia Southern
WR	Joey Hobert	Texas State
OL	Makilan Thomas	Arkansas State
OL	Rasheed Miller	Georgia Southern
OL	Tyler Stephens	James Madison
OL	Grant Betts	Troy
OL	Daniel King	Troy
TE	Eli Wilson	Appalachian State
QB	Joey Aguilar	Appalachian State
RB	Rasheen Ali	Marshall
RB	Frank Gore Jr.	Southern Miss
Second Team Defense
DL	James Carpenter	James Madison
DL	Mikail Kamara	James Madison
DL	Adin Huntington	Louisiana–Monroe
DL	Ben Bell	Texas State
DL	T.J. Jackson	Troy
LB	Nate Johnson	Appalachian State
LB	Quentin Wilfawn	South Alabama
LB	Brian Holloway	Texas State
DB	Ethan Johnson	Appalachian State
DB	Shemar Bartholomew	Georgia Southern
DB	D'Angelo Ponds	James Madison
DB	Dell Pettus	Troy
Second Team Specialists
K	Michael Hughes	Appalachian State
P	Ryan Hanson	James Madison
RS	Ismail Mahdi	Texas State
AP	Frank Gore Jr.	Southern Miss

Position	Player	Team
Third Team Offense
WR	Robert Lewis	Georgia State
WR	Jabre Barber	Troy
WR	Chris Lewis	Troy
OL	Jack Murphy	Appalachian State
OL	Will McDonald	Coastal Carolina
OL	AJ Gillie	Louisiana
OL	Ethan Driskell	Marshall
OL	Brey Walker	Texas State
TE	Neal Johnson	Louisiana
QB	Gunnar Watson	Troy
RB	Jalen White	Georgia Southern
RB	La'Damian Webb	South Alabama
Third Team Defense
DL	Thurman Geathers	Arkansas State
DL	Isaac Walker	Georgia Southern
DL	Elijah Alston	Marshall
DL	Wy'Kevious Thomas	South Alabama
LB	Jontrey Hunter	Georgia State
LB	Aiden Fisher	James Madison
LB	Eli Neal	Marshall
LB	Wayne Matthews III	Old Dominion
DB	Clayton Isbell	Coastal Carolina
DB	Gavin Pringle	Georgia State
DB	Yam Banks	South Alabama
DB	Irshaad Davis	Troy
Third Team Specialists
K	Camden Wise	James Madison
P	John McConnell	Marshall
RS	Ja'Quez Cross	Arkansas State
AP	Caullin Lacy	South Alabama

=== All-Americans ===
Currently, the NCAA compiles consensus all-America teams in the sports of Division I-FBS football and Division I men's basketball using a point system computed from All-America teams named by coaches associations or media sources. The system consists of three points for a first-team honor, two points for second-team honor, and one point for third-team honor. Honorable mention and fourth team or lower recognitions are not accorded any points. College Football All-American consensus teams are compiled by position and the player accumulating the most points at each position is named first team consensus all-American. Currently, the NCAA recognizes All-Americans selected by the AP, AFCA, FWAA, TSN, and the WCFF to determine Consensus and Unanimous All-Americans. Any player named to the First Team by all five of the NCAA-recognized selectors is deemed a Unanimous All-American.

Position	Player	School	Selector	Unanimous	Consensus
First Team All-Americans
DL	Jalen Green	James Madison	AP, SI, The Athletic, USAT, WCFF		
LB	Jason Henderson	Old Dominion	TSN, WCFF		
KR	Jayden Harrison	Marshall	CBS, FOX, FWAA, WCFF		
AP	Ismail Mahdi	Texas State	CBS		

Position	Player	School	Selector	Unanimous	Consensus
Second Team All-Americans
DL	Jalen Green	James Madison	AFCA, CBS, FOX, FWAA, TSN		
LB	Jason Henderson	Old Dominion	AP, FWAA, USAT		
AP	Ismail Mahdi	Texas State	FWAA		

Position	Player	School	Selector	Unanimous	Consensus
Third Team All-Americans
RB	Kimani Vidal	Troy	AP		

== NFL draft ==
The NFL draft will be held at Campus Martius Park in Detroit. The following list includes all Sun Belt players in the draft.

=== List of selections ===
Player	Position	School	Draft Round	Round Pick	Overall Pick	Team
Rasheen Ali	RB	Marshall	5	30	165	Baltimore Ravens
Javon Solomon	DE	Troy	5	33	168	Buffalo Bills
Kimani Vidal	RB	Troy	6	5	181	Los Angeles Chargers
Micah Abraham	CB	Marshall	6	25	201	Indianapolis Colts
Travis Glover	OT	Georgia State	6	26	202	Green Bay Packers
Nate Thomas	OT	Louisiana	7	13	233	Dallas Cowboys
