= Dell Pettus =

American football player (born 2001)

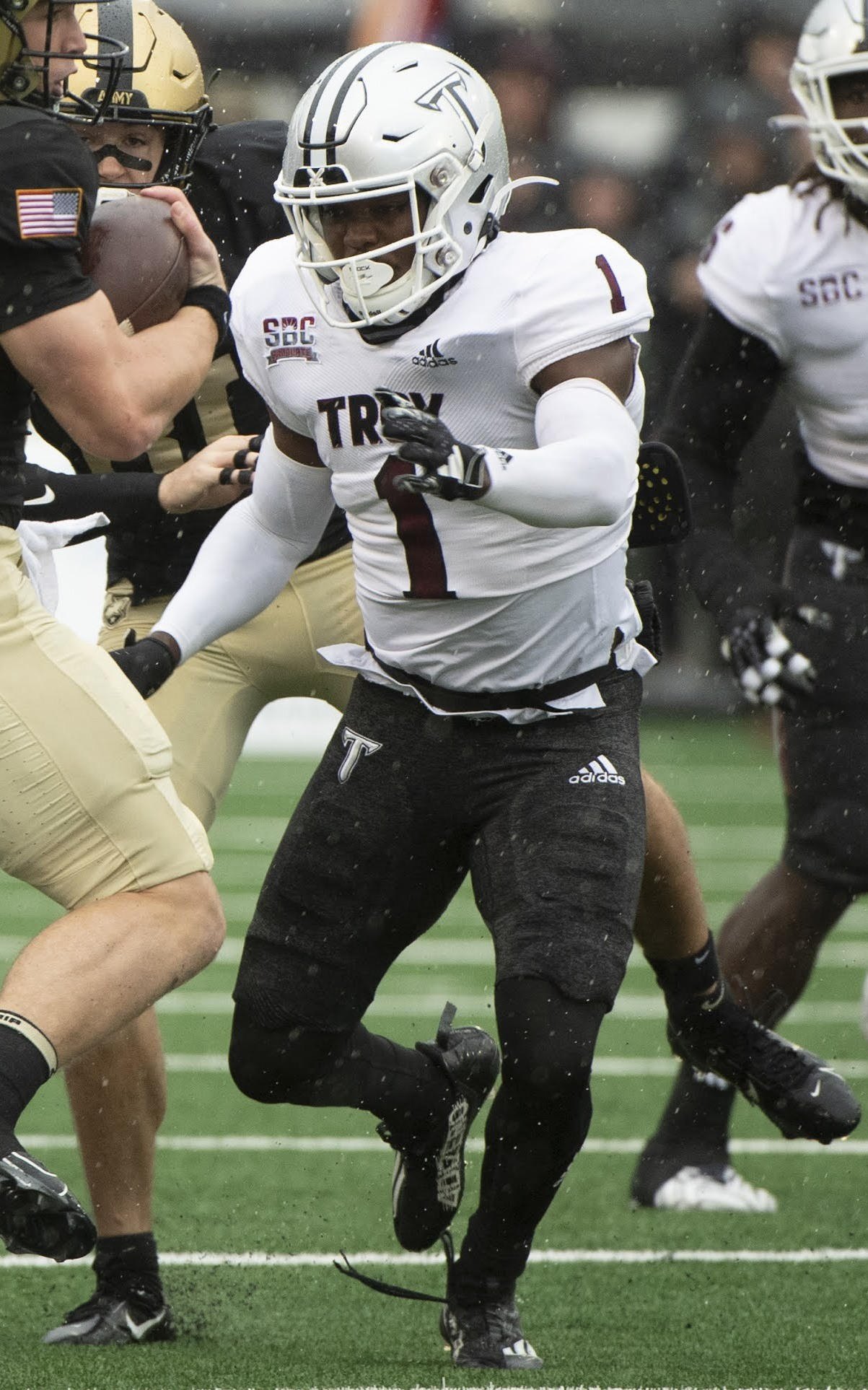
- Pettus with Troy in 2023

No. 24 – New England Patriots
- Position: Safety
- Roster status: Injured reserve

Personal information
- Born: June 2, 2001 (age 25); Huntsville, Alabama, U.S.
- Listed height: 5 ft 11 in (1.80 m)
- Listed weight: 200 lb (91 kg)

Career information
- High school: Sparkman (Harvest, Alabama)
- College: Troy (2019–2023)
- NFL draft: 2024: undrafted

Career history
- New England Patriots (2024–present)

Awards and highlights
- Second-team All-Sun Belt (2023); Third-team All-Sun Belt (2020)

Career NFL statistics as of Week 1, 2026
- Total tackles: 56
- Sacks: 2.0
- Forced fumbles: 1
- Pass deflections: 4
- Stats at Pro Football Reference

Dell Pettus (born June 2, 2001) is an American professional football safety for the New England Patriots of the National Football League (NFL). He played college football for the Troy Trojans.

== Early life ==
Pettus grew up in Harvest, Alabama and attended Sparkman High School, where he lettered in football, baseball and track & field. He finished his high school football career with 10 interceptions, 132 tackles, two forced fumbles and 17 tackles for loss. He was a three-star rated recruit and was named one of the top 50 players in the state of Alabama. He committed to play college football at Troy University.

== College career ==
During Pettus's true freshman season in 2019, he played in all 12 games and started 10 of them at free safety. He finished the season with a freshman leading 63 total tackles. He also averaged 5.9 tackles during his starting games. He was named to the All-Sun Belt team as an honorable mention. During the 2020 season, he played in and started all 11 games at strong safety. He finished the season with 58 tackles, 2.0 tackles for loss, five pass breakups, 44 intercepted yards for an interception and a touchdown. He was named to the All-Sun Belt Third Team. During the 2021 season, he played in and started all 12 games, finishing the season with 54 tackles, 1.0 tackle for loss and a field goal attempt against Liberty. During the 2022 season, he played in and started all 14 games at strong safety. He finished the season with 66 tackles, 0.5 tackles for loss, two pass breakups and a fumble recovery. During the 2023 season, he played in and started all 14 games, finishing the season with 74 tackles, 4.0 tackles for loss, 1.0 sacks, four pass breakups and a fumble recovery. He was named to the All-Sun Belt Second Team.

== Professional career ==
Pre-draft measurables
Height	Weight	Arm length	Hand span	Wingspan	40-yard dash	10-yard split	20-yard split	20-yard shuttle	Three-cone drill	Vertical jump	Broad jump	Bench press
5 ft 10 3/4 in (1.80 m)	200 lb (91 kg)	29 5/8 in (0.75 m)	8 1/4 in (0.21 m)	6 ft 1 1/8 in (1.86 m)	4.51 s	1.58 s	2.62 s	4.36 s	7.00 s	33.5 in (0.85 m)	10 ft 0 in (3.05 m)	18 reps
All values from Pro Day

Pettus went undrafted in the 2024 NFL draft and was signed shortly after by the New England Patriots. Pettus played in Super Bowl LX, recording two total tackles in the 29–13 loss to the Seattle Seahawks.

On September 23, 2026, Pettus was placed on injured reserve due to an ankle injury suffered in Week 3 against the Pittsburgh Steelers.
