= Metrolina Christian Academy =

Christian private school in North Carolina

Coordinates: 35.08595°N 80.65701°W

Location
- 732 Indian Trail-Fairview Road; Indian Trail, North Carolina 28079; United States

Information
- Type: Private, Christian
- Established: 1992 (34 years ago)
- Colors: Burgundy and gray
- Athletics: North Carolina Independent Schools Athletic Association (NCISAA)
- Team name: Warriors
- Accreditation: ACSI; AdvancEd; SACS
- Website: www.metrolinachristian.org

Metrolina Christian Academy (MCA) is a private Christian school in Indian Trail, North Carolina, affiliated to the First Baptist Church of Indian Trail. It is the second largest Christian school in the state of North Carolina. In 2025, longtime Head of School Rick Calloway retired after 27 years of service. The school's Learning & Leadership Center was named in his honor in recognition of his leadership and contributions to the academy.

Metrolina Christian Academy is fully accredited by both the Association of Christian Schools International (ACSI) and Cognia.

== Pathways Program ==
The Pathways Program is a specialized educational program at Metrolina Christian Academy designed to serve students with intellectual and developmental disabilities. The program provides individualized academic instruction while promoting participation in campus life through age-appropriate inclusion opportunities. Students in the program participate in academic, social, spiritual, and vocational experiences alongside their peers when appropriate.

== Notable alumni ==
- Tyrek Funderburk, NFL cornerback for the Tampa Bay Buccaneers
