= Tyrek Funderburk =

American football player (born 2000)

No. 39 – Dallas Cowboys
- Position: Cornerback
- Roster status: Practice squad

Personal information
- Born: November 28, 2000 (age 25); Indian Trail, North Carolina, U.S.
- Listed height: 6 ft 0 in (1.83 m)
- Listed weight: 185 lb (84 kg)

Career information
- High school: Metrolina Christian Academy (Indian Trail, North Carolina)
- College: Richmond (2018–2022); Appalachian State (2023)
- NFL draft: 2024: undrafted

Career history
- Tampa Bay Buccaneers (2024); Minnesota Vikings (2025)*; Carolina Panthers (2026)*; Dallas Cowboys (2026–present)*
- * Offseason or practice squad member only

Awards and highlights
- First-team All-Sun Belt (2023); Second-team All-CAA (2020–21)

Career NFL statistics as of 2024
- Total tackles: 14
- Forced fumbles: 1
- Pass deflections: 1
- Stats at Pro Football Reference

Tyrek Funderburk (born November 28, 2000) is an American professional football cornerback for the Dallas Cowboys of the National Football League (NFL). He played college football for the Richmond Spiders and Appalachian State Mountaineers, and was signed to the Tampa Bay Buccaneers after going unselected in the 2024 NFL draft.

== Early life ==
Funderburk attended high school at Metrolina Christian Academy located in Indian Trail, North Carolina. Coming out of high school, Funderburk committed to play college football for the Richmond Spiders.

== College career ==
=== Richmond ===
Funderburk played five years for the Spiders before entering the NCAA transfer portal at the conclusion of the 2022 season.

=== Appalachian State ===
Funderburk decided to transfer to play for the Appalachian State Mountaineers for the 2023 season.

== Professional career ==
Pre-draft measurables
Height	Weight	Arm length	Hand span	Wingspan	40-yard dash	10-yard split	20-yard split	20-yard shuttle	Three-cone drill	Vertical jump	Broad jump	Bench press
5 ft 11 in (1.80 m)	186 lb (84 kg)	30 5/8 in (0.78 m)	8 1/4 in (0.21 m)	6 ft 1 3/8 in (1.86 m)	4.40 s	1.53 s	2.53 s	4.29 s	7.00 s	34.5 in (0.88 m)	10 ft 3 in (3.12 m)	14 reps
All values from Pro Day

=== Tampa Bay Buccaneers ===
After not being selected in the 2024 NFL draft, Funderburk signed with the Tampa Bay Buccaneers as an undrafted free agent. He made the team's final roster.

On August 26, 2025, Funderburk was waived by the Buccaneers with an injury designation as part of final roster cuts.

=== Minnesota Vikings ===
On September 11, 2025, Funderburk was signed to the Minnesota Vikings' practice squad.

=== Carolina Panthers ===
On January 12, 2026, Funderburk signed a reserve/future contract with the Carolina Panthers. He was waived/injured by the team on August 30. On September 3, Funderburk was waived from injured reserve.

=== Dallas Cowboys ===
On September 30, 2026, Funderburk signed with the Dallas Cowboys practice squad.
