= Cole Pennington =

American football player

No. 12 – Gardner–Webb Runnin' Bulldogs
- Position: Quarterback
- Class: Redshirt Senior

Personal information
- Listed height: 6 ft 4 in (1.93 m)
- Listed weight: 220 lb (100 kg)

Career information
- High school: Sayre School (Lexington, Kentucky)
- College: Marshall (2022–2024); Gardner–Webb (2025–present)
- Stats at ESPN

Cole Pennington is an American college football quarterback for the Gardner–Webb Runnin' Bulldogs. He previously played for the Marshall Thundering Herd

== Early life ==
Pennington grew up in Versailles, Kentucky, and attended Sayre School where he lettered in football and basketball. During his high school career, he led the Spartans with a 16-4 all-time record and threw for over 4,000 yards and scored 56 total touchdowns with a 70% completion percentage. He was a three-star rated recruit and committed to play college football at Marshall University over offers from Akron, Ball State, Eastern Kentucky and UT Martin.

== College career ==
=== Marshall ===
Pennington was redshirted during his true freshman season in 2022, as he only saw action in two games.

During the 2023 season, he played in four games and started three of them, finishing the season with completing 64 out of 112 passing attempts for 695 yards. He became the starting quarterback during a game against Coastal Carolina after an injury from Cam Fancher, where Pennington completed 12 out of 23 passing attempts for 77 yards and two interceptions. During the 2023 Frisco Bowl, he completed 15 out of 33 passing attempts for 258 yards as the starting quarterback.

=== Gardner–Webb ===
On January 8, 2025, Pennington transferred to Gardner–Webb.

=== Statistics ===
Year	Team	Games			Passing								Rushing			
Year	Team	GP	GS	Record	Cmp	Att	Pct	Yds	Avg	TD	Int	Rtg	Att	Yds	Avg	TD
2022	Marshall	Redshirt														
2023	Marshall	4	3	1–2	64	112	57.1	695	6.2	0	6	98.6	15	-69	-4.6	0
2024	Marshall	3	0	0–0	5	7	71.4	57	8.1	1	0	187.0	2	10	5.0	0
2025	Gardner–Webb	0	0	–	0	0	0.0	0	0.0	0	0	0.0	0	0	0.0	0
Career		7	3	1–2	69	119	58.0	752	6.3	1	6	103.8	17	-59	-3.5	0

== Personal life ==
Pennington is a Christian. He is the son of former NFL and Marshall quarterback Chad Pennington, who has been Sayre's head football coach since the school restarted its football program in 2018.
