= Jalen Green (American football) =

American football player (born 2001)

No. 77
- Position: Defensive end

Personal information
- Born: March 15, 2001 (age 25); Baltimore, Maryland, U.S.
- Listed height: 6 ft 1 in (1.85 m)
- Listed weight: 245 lb (111 kg)

Career information
- High school: Our Lady of Good Counsel (Olney, Maryland)
- College: James Madison (2019–2023)
- NFL draft: 2024: undrafted

Career history
- Toronto Argonauts (2024)*
- * Offseason or practice squad member only

Awards and highlights
- First-team All-American (2023); Sun Belt Defensive Player of the Year (2023); First-team All-Sun Belt (2023); Dudley Award (2023)
- Stats at Pro Football Reference

Jalen Green (born March 15, 2001) is an American professional football defensive end. He played college football for the James Madison Dukes.

== Early life ==
Green grew up in Baltimore, Maryland, and attended Our Lady of Good Counsel where he lettered in football and basketball. In his high school career, Green completed 103 total tackles (45 solo stops and 61 assisted). Green also made a total of 8.0 sacks making 0.5 sacks per game. He was rated a three-star recruit and committed to play college football at James Madison over offers from Army and Virginia.

== College career ==
As a freshman in 2019, Green played in 14 games and recorded 11 total tackles (four solo stops and seven assisted), two tackles for loss for six yards and 0.5 sacks for a yard. He missed the entire 2020 season due to injury. In 2021, Green played 13 games and finished the season with 14 total tackles (five solo and nine assisted), 2.5 tackles for loss, 2.0 sacks, one forced fumble, one pass breakup and one quarterback hurry. In 2022, he played all 11 games with one start at defensive end, recording 22 total tackles (nine solo stops and 13 assisted), 6.0 tackles for loss, 2.5 sacks, one interception and one pass breakup.

In 2023, Green played nine games before suffering a season-ending knee injury against Georgia State. He finished the season with 50 total tackles (23 solo stops and 27 assisted), 21 tackles for loss for 132 yards, 15.5 sacks for 120 yards, one interception returned for a touchdown, two pass breakups and two forced fumbles.

== Professional career ==
Pre-draft measurables
Height	Weight	Bench press
6 ft 0 1/4 in (1.84 m)	245 lb (111 kg)	19 reps
All values from Pro Day

=== Toronto Argonauts ===
On September 24, 2024, it was announced that Green had signed a practice roster agreement with the Toronto Argonauts. On October 3, 2024, he was released from the practice roster and signed a futures contract for the 2025 season.

On May 13, 2025, during the second round of camp cuts, Toronto released Jalen Green.
