= Clayton Isbell =

American football player (born 2000)

Profile
- Position: Linebacker

Personal information
- Born: August 3, 2000 (age 26); Naperville, Illinois, U.S.
- Listed height: 6 ft 2 in (1.88 m)
- Listed weight: 220 lb (100 kg)

Career information
- High school: St. Charles East (St. Charles, Illinois)
- College: Illinois State (2018–2021); Utah (2022); Coastal Carolina (2023)
- NFL draft: 2024: undrafted

Career history
- Carolina Panthers (2024)*; New York Giants (2024)*; Edmonton Elks (2025)*
- * Offseason or practice squad member only

Awards and highlights
- Third-team All-Sun Belt (2023); Second-team All-MVFC (2021)

Clayton Isbell (born August 3, 2000) is an American professional football linebacker. He played college football at Illinois State, Utah, and Coastal Carolina before being signed by the Carolina Panthers as an undrafted free agent.

== Early life ==
Isbell attended high school at St. Charles East. Coming out of high school, Isbell decided to commit to play college football for the Illinois State Redbirds.

== College career ==
During Isbell's career at Illinois State, he played in 28 games notching 105 tackles with five and a half being for a loss, six pass deflections, five interceptions, two fumble recoveries, and a forced fumble, en route to being named a FCS All-American twice. After two seasons at Illinois State, Isbell decided to enter the transfer portal.

Isbell decided to transfer to play for the Utah Utes. During Isbell's lone season with Utah in 2022, he played in all fourteen games making one start where he recorded 16 tackles with half a tackle being for a loss. After the conclusion of the 2022 season, Isbell decided to enter his name into the NCAA transfer portal.

For the 2023 season, Isbell decided to transfer to play for the Coastal Carolina Chanticleers. In week one of the 2023 season, Isbell made three interceptions in a loss against UCLA. In his senior season in 2023, Isbell tallied 86 tackles with four and a half being for a loss, five pass deflections, and three interceptions. After the conclusion of the 2023 season, Isbell decided to declare for the 2024 NFL draft.

== Professional career ==
Pre-draft measurables
Height	Weight	Arm length	Hand span	40-yard dash	10-yard split	20-yard split	Vertical jump	Broad jump	Bench press
6 ft 2 in (1.88 m)	221 lb (100 kg)	33 1/2 in (0.85 m)	10 1/8 in (0.26 m)	4.82 s	1.64 s	2.77 s	32 in (0.81 m)	9 ft 11 in (3.02 m)	08 reps
All values from Pro Day

=== Carolina Panthers ===
Isbell went undrafted in the 2024 NFL draft, and signed with the Carolina Panthers as an UDFA. He was waived on July 26.

=== New York Giants ===
On August 20, 2024, Isbell signed with the New York Giants, but waived five days later.

=== Edmonton Elks ===
Isbell was signed by the Edmonton Elks on January 28, 2025. He was released by the Elks on June 1.
