= Elijah Alston =

American gridiron football player (born 2001)

No. 58 – Edmonton Elks
- Position: Defensive lineman
- Roster status: Practice roster
- CFL status: American

Personal information
- Born: August 28, 2001 (age 25)
- Listed height: 6 ft 2 in (1.88 m)
- Listed weight: 256 lb (116 kg)

Career information
- High school: Oscar F. Smith (Chesapeake, Virginia)
- College: Marshall (2019–2023) Miami (2024)

Career history
- Edmonton Elks (2025–present)

Awards and highlights
- Grey Cup champion (2026); Third-team All-Sun Belt (2023)

Career CFL statistics as of 2026
- Games played: 7
- Tackles: 8
- Sacks: 1
- Stats at CFL.ca
- Stats at Pro Football Reference

Elijah Alston (born August 28, 2001) is an American professional football defensive lineman for the Edmonton Elks of the Canadian Football League (CFL). He played college football for the Marshall Thundering Herd and Miami Hurricanes.

== Early life ==
Alston was born on August 28, 2001. He attended Oscar F. Smith High School in Chesapeake, Virginia.

== College career ==
Alston played college football for the Marshall Thundering Herd from 2019 to 2023 and Miami Hurricanes in 2024. After he redshirted his first year, he played in 42 games, registering 108 tackles, including 19.5 for loss, 9.5 sacks, one pick-six, five pass break ups, four forced fumbles and one fumble recovery. In 2023, Alston earned third-team All-Sun Belt honors. On December 20, 2023, he entered the transfer portal.

On January 8, 2024, Alston committed to Texas A&M University but decommitted the following day. On January 11, he committed to University of Miami. In eight games, Alston had 19 tackles, including 3.5 for loss, 2.5 sacks, one interception and 3 pass deflections.

== Professional career ==
Pre-draft measurables
Height	Weight	Arm length	Hand span	Wingspan	20-yard shuttle	Three-cone drill	Vertical jump	Broad jump	Bench press
6 ft 3 in (1.91 m)	249 lb (113 kg)	30 in (0.76 m)	9 3/8 in (0.24 m)	6 ft 2 1/4 in (1.89 m)	4.45 s	7.52 s	31 in (0.79 m)	9 ft 7 in (2.92 m)	17 reps
All values from Pro day

On June 23, 2025, Alston signed to the practice roster of the Edmonton Elks of the Canadian Football League (CFL). On September 5, he was elevated to the active roster. In 2025, Alston dressed in three games, recording four tackles and one sack.

On June 5, 2026, Alston was placed on the reserve roster. On August 13, he was moved to the practice roster. On September 10, Alston was signed to the active roster.
