= 2023 Marshall Thundering Herd football team =

American college football season

2023 Marshall Thundering Herd football

Frisco Bowl, L 17–35 vs. UTSA
- Conference: Sun Belt Conference
- East Division
- Record: 6–7 (3–5 Sun Belt)
- Head coach: Charles Huff (3rd season)
- Offensive coordinator: Clint Trickett (2nd season)
- Offensive scheme: Multiple
- Defensive coordinator: Jason Semore (1st season)
- Base defense: Multiple
- Home stadium: Joan C. Edwards Stadium

2023 Sun Belt Conference football standings
	Conf.			Overall
Team	W		L	W		L
East Division
James Madison* x	7	–	1	11	–	2
Appalachian State y	6	–	2	9	–	5
Coastal Carolina	5	–	3	8	–	5
Old Dominion	5	–	3	6	–	7
Georgia State	3	–	5	7	–	6
Marshall	3	–	5	6	–	7
Georgia Southern	3	–	5	6	–	7
West Division
Troy xy$	7	–	1	11	–	3
Texas State	4	–	4	8	–	5
Arkansas State	4	–	4	6	–	7
South Alabama	4	–	4	7	–	6
Louisiana	3	–	5	6	–	7
Southern Miss	2	–	6	3	–	9
Louisiana–Monroe	0	–	8	2	–	10
Championship: Troy 49, Appalachian State 23
$ – Conference champion; x – Division champion/co-champions; y – Championship game participant; * – Ineligible for postseason play due to FCS-to-FBS transition rules

The 2023 Marshall Thundering Herd football team represented Marshall University during the 2023 NCAA Division I FBS football season. The Thundering Herd played their home games at the Joan C. Edwards Stadium in Huntington, West Virginia, and competed in the East Division of the Sun Belt Conference. The team was coached by third-year head coach Charles Huff.

== Preseason ==
=== Media poll ===
In the Sun Belt preseason coaches' poll, the Thundering Herd were picked to finish in fourth place in the East division.

Offensive lineman Logan Osburn, Defensive lineman Owen Porter, linebacker Eli Neal, and defensive back Micah Abraham were named to the preseason All-Sun Belt first team. Running back Rasheen Ali and offensive lineman Ethan Driskell were named to the second team.

== Offseason ==
=== Coaching changes ===
On February 7 defensive coordinator Lance Guidry was hired by the University of Miami to be their defensive coordinator.

On February 9 the Thundering herd hired Jason Semore to be their defensive coordinator. He was previously the safeties and special teams coach at Georgia Tech.

== Schedule ==
The football schedule was announced February 24, 2023.

Date	Time	Opponent	Site	TV	Result	Attendance
September 2	6:00 p.m.	Albany*	Joan C. Edwards Stadium; Huntington, WV	ESPN+	W 21–17	25,101
September 9	4:00 p.m.	at East Carolina*	Dowdy–Ficklen Stadium; Greenville, NC (rivalry)	ESPNU	W 31–13	38,211
September 23	12:00 p.m.	Virginia Tech*	Joan C. Edwards Stadium; Huntington, WV	ESPN2	W 24–17	31,475
September 30	3:30 p.m.	Old Dominion^{†}	Joan C. Edwards Stadium; Huntington, WV	ESPN+	W 41–35	22,652
October 7	2:00 p.m.	at NC State*	Carter–Finley Stadium; Raleigh, NC	The CW	L 41–48	56,919
October 14	7:00 p.m.	at Georgia State	Center Parc Stadium; Atlanta, GA	ESPN2	L 24–41	16,718
October 19	7:00 p.m.	James Madison	Joan C. Edwards Stadium; Huntington, WV	ESPN	L 9–20	22,109
October 28	6:00 p.m.	at Coastal Carolina	Brooks Stadium; Conway, SC	NFLN	L 6–34	21,324
November 4	6:00 p.m.	at Appalachian State	Kidd Brewer Stadium; Boone, NC (rivalry)	NFLN	L 9–31	34,057
November 11	7:00 p.m.	Georgia Southern	Joan C. Edwards Stadium; Huntington, WV	NFLN	W 38–33	19,175
November 18	5:00 p.m.	at South Alabama	Hancock Whitney Stadium; Mobile, AL	ESPN+	L 0–28	14,105
November 25	3:30 p.m.	Arkansas State	Joan C. Edwards Stadium; Huntington, WV	ESPN+	W 35–21	18,673
December 19	9:00 p.m.	vs. UTSA*	Toyota Stadium; Frisco, TX (Frisco Bowl)	ESPN	L 17–35	11,215
*Non-conference game; ^{†}Homecoming; Rankings from AP Poll and CFP Rankings released prior to game; All times are in Eastern time

== Roster ==
2023 Marshall Thundering Herd football team roster
Players
Coaches
Offense

Pos.	#	Name	Class
QB	12	Cole Pennington	Fr
QB	14	Cam Fancher	So
RB	22	Rasheen Ali	Jr
OL	52	Ethan Driskell	Sr
OL	68	Dalton Tucker	Sr

Defense

Pos.	#	Name	Class
CB	6	Micah Abraham	Sr
DB	11	J.J. Roberts	Jr
LB	14	Stephen Dix Jr.	So
DL	15	Mike Green	Fr

Special teams

Pos.	#	Name	Class

Head coach

- Charles Huff

Coordinators/assistant coaches

Legend

- (C) Team captain
- (S) Suspended
- (I) Ineligible
- Injured
- Redshirt

Roster

== Game summaries ==
=== Albany ===
Game One – Albany Great Danes (1–0) at Marshall Thundering Herd (0–0)

Quarter	1	2	3	4	Total
Great Danes	0	3	14	0	17
Thundering Herd	0	0	14	7	21

at Joan C. Edwards Stadium • Huntington, West Virginia

- Date: Saturday, September 2, 2023
- Game time: 6:00 p.m. EDT
- Game weather: Sunny • Temperature: 91 °F (33 °C)
- Game attendance: 25,101
- Referee: Javarro Edwards
- TV announcers (ESPN+): Mark Martin (play-by-play), Carl Lee (analyst)

Game information

First quarter

- No scoring plays

Second quarter

- (0:06) ALB – John Opalko 46 yard field goal (Drive: 6 plays, 20 yards, 1:03; Albany 3–0)

Third quarter

- (9:35) ALB – Jackson Parker 19 yard pass from Reese Poffenbarger, John Opalko kick (Drive: 11 plays, 75 yards, 5:25; Albany 10–0)
- (6:50) MRSH – Chuck Montgomery 19 yard pass from Cam Fancher, Rece Verhoff kick (Drive: 8 plays, 65 yards, 2:38; Albany 10–7)
- (3:31) ALB – Reese Poffenbarger 54 yard run, John Opalko kick (Drive: 6 plays, 75 yards, 3:19; Albany 17–7)
- (2:22) MRSH – Rasheen Ali 13 yard run, Rece Verhoff kick (Drive: 3 plays, 65 yards, 1:09; Albany 17–14)

Fourth quarter

- (12:53) MRSH – Rasheen Ali 30 yard run, Rece Verhoff kick (Drive: 6 plays, 54 yards, 2:30; Marshall 21–17)

Statistics	ALB	MRSH
First downs	19	21
Plays–yards	74–300	61–413
Rushes–yards	36–106	26–145
Passing yards	194	268
Passing: comp–att–int	22–38–0	28–35–1
Turnovers		
Time of possession	35:09	24:51

Team	Category	Player	Statistics
Albany	Passing	Reese Poffenbarger	22/38, 194 yards, 1 TD
Albany	Rushing	Nate Larkins	13 carries, 39 yards
Albany	Receiving	Jackson Parker	5 receptions, 51 yards, 1 TD
Marshall	Passing	Cam Fancher	28/35, 268 yards, 1 TD, 1 INT
Marshall	Rushing	Rasheen Ali	18 carries, 137 yards, 2 TD
Marshall	Receiving	Chuck Montgomery	6 receptions, 81 yards, 1 TD

=== at East Carolina ===
Game Two – Marshall Thundering Herd (1–0) at East Carolina Pirates (0–1)

Quarter	1	2	3	4	Total
Thundering Herd	0	10	0	21	31
Pirates	0	10	3	0	13

at Dowdy–Ficklen Stadium • Greenville, North Carolina

- Date: Saturday, September 9, 2023
- Game time: 4:00 p.m. EDT
- Game weather: Cloudy • Temperature: 81 °F (27 °C) • Wind: SE 10 mph
- Game attendance: 38,211
- Referee: Marshall Lewis
- TV announcers (ESPNU): Jay Alter (play-by-play), Rene Ingoglia (analyst)

Game information

First quarter

- No scoring plays

Second quarter

- (11:32) MRSH – Rasheen Ali 1 yard run, Kameron Lake kick (Drive: 12 plays, 79 yards, 4:37; Marshall 7–0)
- (6:03) MRSH – Kameron Lake 20 yard field goal (Drive: 10 plays, 68 yards, 4:25; Marshall 10–0)
- (3:53) ECU – Andrew Conrad 39 yard field goal (Drive: 5 plays, 53 yards, 2:10; Marshall 10–3)
- (2:22) ECU – Shane Calhoun 2 yard pass from Mason Garcia, Andrew Conrad kick (Drive: 3 plays, 3 yards, 1:16; Tied 10–10)

Third quarter

- (6:04) ECU – Andrew Conrad 30 yard field goal (Drive: 11 plays, 58 yards, 5:43; East Carolina 13–10)

Fourth quarter

- (11:07) MRSH – Caleb McMillan 75 yard pass from Chuck Montgomery, Kameron Lake kick (Drive: 1 play, 75 yards, 0:11; Marshall 17–13)
- (7:16) MRSH – Rasheen Ali 56 yard run, Kameron Lake kick (Drive: 5 plays, 77 yards, 2:17; Marshall 24–13)
- (6:13) MRSH – Rasheen Ali 14 yard run, Kameron Lake kick (Drive: 2 plays, 23 yards, 0:53; Marshall 31–13)

Statistics	MRSH	ECU
First downs	22	13
Plays–yards	68–392	69–269
Rushes–yards	38–131	38–146
Passing yards	261	123
Passing: comp–att–int	17–30–0	13–31–2
Turnovers		
Time of possession	30:05	29:55

Team	Category	Player	Statistics
Marshall	Passing	Cam Fancher	15/28, 178 yards
Marshall	Rushing	Rasheen Ali	18 carries, 85 yards, 3 TD
Marshall	Receiving	Caleb McMillan	4 receptions, 85 yards, 1 TD
East Carolina	Passing	Mason Garcia	10/23, 62 yards, 1 TD, 1 INT
East Carolina	Rushing	Mason Garcia	16 carries, 118 yards
East Carolina	Receiving	Jsi Hatfield	4 receptions, 57 yards

=== Virginia Tech ===
Game Three – Virginia Tech Hokies (1–2) at Marshall Thundering Herd (2–0)

Quarter	1	2	3	4	Total
Hokies	7	3	0	7	17
Thundering Herd	0	17	7	0	24

at Joan C. Edwards Stadium • Huntington, West Virginia

- Date: Saturday, September 23, 2023
- Game time: 12:00 p.m. EDT
- Game weather: Sunny • Temperature: 76 °F (24 °C)
- Game attendance: 31,475
- Referee: Ted Pitts
- TV announcers (ESPN2): Roy Philpott (play-by-play), Roddy Jones (analyst), Taylor McGregor (sideline)

Game information

First quarter

- (11:59) VT – Kyron Drones 31 yard run, John Love kick (Drive: 6 plays, 75 yards, 3:01; Virginia Tech 7–0)

Second quarter

- (14:50) MRSH – DeMarcus Harris 12 yard pass from Cam Fancher, Rece Verhoff kick (Drive: 9 plays, 78 yards, 3:27; Tied 7–7)
- (11:47) VT – John Love 21 yard field goal (Drive: 8 plays, 70 yards, 3:03; Virginia Tech 10–7)
- (9:10) MRSH – Rasheen Ali 56 yard run, Rece Verhoff kick (Drive: 6 plays, 75 yards, 2:37; Marshall 14–10)
- (2:55) MRSH – Rece Verhoff 21 yard field goal (Drive: 11 plays, 41 yards, 5:34; Marshall 17–10)

Third quarter

- (7:22) MRSH – Rasheen Ali 1 yard run, Rece Verhoff kick (Drive: 7 plays, 98 yards, 3:32; Marshall 24–10)

Fourth quarter

- (7:14) VT – Kyron Drones 16 yard run, John Love kick (Drive: 7 plays, 65 yards, 3:24; Marshall 24–17)

Statistics	VT	MRSH
First downs	16	19
Plays–yards	65–343	71–380
Rushes–yards	30–184	44–214
Passing yards	159	166
Passing: comp–att–int	19–35–0	16–27–2
Turnovers		
Time of possession	27:14	32:46

Team	Category	Player	Statistics
Virginia Tech	Passing	Kyron Drones	19/35, 159 yards
Virginia Tech	Rushing	Bhayshul Tuten	9 carries, 88 yards
Virginia Tech	Receiving	Benji Gosnell	4 receptions, 52 yards
Marshall	Passing	Cam Fancher	16/27, 166 yards, 1 TD, 2 INT
Marshall	Rushing	Rasheen Ali	27 carries, 174 yards, 2 TD
Marshall	Receiving	Caleb Coombs	4 receptions, 41 yards

=== Old Dominion ===
Game Four – Old Dominion Monarchs (2–2) at Marshall Thundering Herd (3–0)

Quarter	1	2	3	4	Total
Monarchs	7	14	7	7	35
Thundering Herd	3	14	21	3	41

at Joan C. Edwards Stadium • Huntington, West Virginia

- Date: Saturday, September 30, 2023
- Game time: 3:30 p.m. EDT
- Game weather: Sunny
- Game attendance: 22,652
- Referee: Wayne Winkler
- TV announcers (ESPN+): Mark Martin (play-by-play), Carl Lee (analyst)

Game information

First quarter

- (14:03) ODU – Jack Shields 66 yard run, Ethan Sanchez kick (Drive: 3 plays, 70 yards, 0:49; Old Dominion 7–0)
- (5:26) MRSH – Rece Verhoff 42 yard field goal (Drive: 6 plays, 23 yards, 1:40; Old Dominion 7–3)

Second quarter

- (13:23) ODU – Jordan Bly 19 yard pass from Jack Shields, Ethan Sanchez kick (Drive: 1 play, 19 yards, 0:06; Old Dominion 14–3)
- (11:17) ODU – Kadarius Calloway 70 yard run, Ethan Sanchez kick (Drive: 1 play, 70 yards, 0:11; Old Dominion 21–3)
- (9:11) MRSH – Cade Conley 1 yard pass from Cam Fancher, Rece Verhoff kick (Drive: 4 plays, 57 yards, 2:00; Old Dominion 21–10)
- (3:31) MRSH – Caleb Coombs 22 yard pass from Cam Fancher, Rece Verhoff kick (Drive: 7 plays, 60 yards, 3:03; Old Dominion 21–17)

Third quarter

- (10:10) MRSH – Rasheen Ali 1 yard run, Rece Verhoff kick (Drive: 9 plays, 94 yards, 4:42; Marshall 24–21)
- (8:13) MRSH – Elijah Alston 85 yard interception return, Rece Verhoff kick (Marshall 31–21)
- (7:50) ODU – Kadarius Calloway 69 yard run, Ethan Sanchez kick (Drive: 2 plays, 73 yards, 0:23; Marshall 31–28)
- (2:59) MRSH – Rasheen Ali 1 yard run, Rece Verhoff kick (Drive: 10 plays, 68 yards, 4:44; Marshall 38–28)

Fourth quarter

- (8:21) MRSH – Rece Verhoff 30 yard field goal (Drive: 9 plays, 54 yards, 4:59; Marshall 41–28)
- (8:09) ODU – Kadarius Calloway 75 yard run, Ethan Sanchez kick (Drive: 1 play, 75 yards, 0:12; Marshall 41–35)

Statistics	ODU	MRSH
First downs	11	30
Plays–yards	54–434	84–464
Rushes–yards	31–339	49–186
Passing yards	95	278
Passing: comp–att–int	11–23–3	29–35–1
Turnovers		
Time of possession	18:39	41:21

Team	Category	Player	Statistics
Old Dominion	Passing	Jack Shields	11/23, 95 yards, 1 TD, 3 INT
Old Dominion	Rushing	Kadarius Calloway	11 carries, 236 yards, 3 TD
Old Dominion	Receiving	Reymello Murphy	1 reception, 42 yards
Marshall	Passing	Cam Fancher	29/35, 278 yards, 2 TD, 1 INT
Marshall	Rushing	Cam Fancher	15 carries, 102 yards
Marshall	Receiving	Caleb Coombs	8 receptions, 76 yards, 1 TD

=== at NC State ===
Game Five – Marshall Thundering Herd (4–0) at NC State Wolfpack (3–2)

Quarter	1	2	3	4	Total
Thundering Herd	14	10	10	7	41
Wolfpack	7	14	14	13	48

at Carter–Finley Stadium • Raleigh, North Carolina

- Date: Saturday, October 7, 2023
- Game time: 2:00 p.m. EDT
- Game weather: Sunny • Temperature: 72 °F (22 °C) • Wind: NW 11mph
- Game attendance: 56,919
- Referee: Jeff Flanagan
- TV announcers (The CW): Evan Lepler (play-by-play), James Bates (analyst), Tabitha Turner (sideline)

Game information

First quarter

- (11:14) MRSH – Cam Fancher 7 yard run, Rece Verhoff kick (Drive: 4 plays, 29 yards, 1:27; Marshall 7–0)
- (8:20) NCSU – Kevin Concepcion 17 yard pass from MJ Morris, Brayden Narveson kick (Drive: 7 plays, 43 yards, 2:47; Tied 7–7)
- (2:57) MRSH – Josh Moten 27 yard interception return, Rece Verhoff kick (Drive: 2 plays, 0 yards, 0:13; Marshall 14–7)

Second quarter*

- (11:43) NCSU – Delbert Mimms III 18 yard run, Brayden Narveson kick (Drive: 6 plays, 55 plays, 2:32; Tied 14–14)
- (9:45) NCSU – Trent Pennix 39 yard pass from MJ Morris, Brayden Narveson kick (Drive: 1 play, 39 yards, 0:07; NC State 21–14)
- (2:34) MRSH – Rece Verhoff 43 yard field goal (Drive: 9 plays, 34 yards, 3:56; NC State 21–17)
- (0:31) MRSH – Cam Fancher 4 yard run, Rece Verhoff kick (Drive: 5 plays, 66 yards, 1:18; Marshall 24–21)

Third quarter

- (9:03) NCSU – Michael Allen 37 yard run, Brayden Narveson kick (Drive: 6 plays, 58 yards, 3:23; NC State 28–24)
- (7:31) MRSH – Jayden Harrison 28 yard pass from Cam Fancher, Rece Verhoff kick (Drive: 5 plays, 75 yards, 1:32; Marshall 31–28)
- (6:43) NCSU – Trent Pennix 62 yard pass from MJ Morris, Brayden Narveson kick (Drive: 2 plays, 68 yards, 0:43; NC State 35–31)
- (1:24) MRSH – Rece Verhoff 26 yard field goal (Drive: 10 plays, 66 yards, 5:19; NC State 35–34)

Fourth quarter

- (14:44) NCSU – Brayden Narveson 40 yard field goal (Drive: 5 plays, 45 yards, 1:33; NC State 38–34)
- (7:03) NCSU – Brayden Narveson 27 yard field goal (Drive: 7 plays, 45 yards, 3:16; NC State 41–34)
- (6:04) NCSU – Kevin Concepcion 8 yard pass from MJ Morris, Brayden Narveson kick (Drive: 2 plays, 9 yards, 0:47; NC State 48–34)
- (1:29) MRSH – Caleb Coombs 16 yard pass from Cam Fancher, Rece Verhoff kick (Drive: 16 plays, 76 yards, 4:30; NC State 48–41)

Statistics	MRSH	NCSU
First downs	22	15
Plays–yards	90–419	66–401
Rushes–yards	38–104	34–136
Passing yards	315	265
Passing: comp–att–int	29–52–1	17–32–3
Turnovers		
Time of possession	32:44	27:16

Team	Category	Player	Statistics
Marshall	Passing	Cam Fancher	29/51, 315 yards, 2 TD, 1 INT
Marshall	Rushing	Rasheen Ali	14 carries, 63 yards
Marshall	Receiving	Darryle Simmons	8 receptions, 87 yards
NC State	Passing	MJ Morris	17/32, 265 yards, 4 TD, 3 INT
NC State	Rushing	Michael Allen	9 carries, 70 yards, 1 TD
NC State	Receiving	Kevin Concepcion	8 receptions, 102 yards, 2 TD

=== at Georgia State ===
Game Six – Marshall Thundering Herd (4–1) at Georgia State Panthers (4–1)

Quarter	1	2	3	4	Total
Thundering Herd	7	10	7	0	24
Panthers	14	13	0	14	41

at Center Parc Stadium • Atlanta, Georgia

- Date: Saturday, October 14, 2023
- Game time: 7:00 p.m. EDT
- Game weather: Sunny • Temperature: 70 °F (21 °C)
- Game attendance: 16,718
- Referee: Jeremy Parker
- TV announcers (ESPN2): Roy Philpot (play-by-play), Roddy Jones (analyst), Taylor McGregor (sideline)

Game information

First quarter

- (13:03) GSU – Darren Grainger 24 yard run, Liam Rickman kick (Drive: 6 plays, 75 yards, 1:57; Georgia State 7–0)
- (10:30) MRSH – Rasheen Ali 2 yard run, Rece Verhoff kick (Drive: 6 plays, 70 yards, 2:33; Tied 7–7)
- (6:50) GSU – Izaiah Guy 4 yard return of blocked punt, Liam Rickman kick (Georgia State 14–7)

Second quarter

- (13:17) GSU – Liam Rickman 34 yard field goal (Drive: 12 plays, 64 yards, 6:32; Georgia State 17–7)
- (8:02) MRSH – Rece Verhoff 21 yard field goal (Drive: 10 plays, 71 yards, 5:15; Georgia State 17–10)
- (2:47) GSU – Liam Rickman 39 yard field goal (Drive: 10 plays, 53 yards, 5:15; Georgia State 20–10)
- (1:19) GSU – Tailique Williams 74 yard pass from Darren Grainger, Liam Rickman kick (Drive: 2 plays, 81 yards, 0:18; Georgia State 27–10)
- (0:23) MRSH – Rasheen Ali 2 yard run, Rece Verhoff kick (Drive: 9 plays, 75 yards, 0:56; Georgia State 27–17)

Third quarter

- (0:00) MRSH – Rasheen Ali 65 yard pass from Cam Fancher, Rece Verhoff kick (Drive: 3 plays, 71 yards, 1:20; Georgia State 27–24)

Fourth quarter

- (11:02) GSU – Darren Grainger 2 yard run, Liam Rickman kick (Drive: 8 plays, 75 yards, 3:58; Georgia State 34–24)
- (1:42) GSU – Marcus Carroll 2 yard run, Liam Rickman kick (Drive: 13 plays, 83 yards, 6:17; Georgia State 41–24)

Statistics	MRSH	GSU
First downs	23	25
Plays–yards	68–457	73–474
Rushes–yards	34–156	42–240
Passing yards	301	234
Passing: comp–att–int	27–34–0	21–31–0
Turnovers		
Time of possession	24:43	35:17

Team	Category	Player	Statistics
Marshall	Passing	Cam Fancher	27/34, 301 yards, 1 TD
Marshall	Rushing	Rasheen Ali	19 carries, 103 yards, 2 TD
Marshall	Receiving	Rasheen Ali	4 receptions, 71 yards, 1 TD
Georgia State	Passing	Darren Grainger	21/31, 234 yards, 1 TD
Georgia State	Rushing	Marcus Carroll	28 carries, 159 yards, 1 TD
Georgia State	Receiving	Tailique Williams	6 receptions, 129 yards, 1 TD

=== James Madison ===
Game Seven – James Madison Dukes (6–0) at Marshall Thundering Herd (4–2)

Quarter	1	2	3	4	Total
Dukes	0	3	10	7	20
Thundering Herd	0	0	2	7	9

at Joan C. Edwards Stadium • Huntington, West Virginia

- Date: Thursday, October 19, 2023
- Game time: 7:00 p.m. EDT
- Game weather: Sunny
- Game attendance: 22,109
- Referee: Wayne Winkler
- TV announcers (ESPN): Matt Barrie (play-by-play), Roddy Jones (analyst), Harry Lyles Jr. (sideline)

Game information

First quarter

- No scoring plays

Second quarter

- (11:38) JMU – Camden Wise 27 yard field goal (Drive: 7 plays, 65 yards, 3:53; James Madison 3–0)

Third quarter

- (11:57) MRSH – TyQaze Leggs safety (James Madison 3–2)
- (7:17) JMU – Camden Wise 38 yard field goal (Drive: 6 plays, 79 yards, 3:00; James Madison 6–2)
- (1:12) JMU – Jordan McCloud 6 yard run, Camden Wise kick (Drive: 10 plays, 62 yards, 4:55; James Madison 13–2)

Fourth quarter

- (14:08) JMU – Reggie Brown 28 yard pass from Jordan McCloud, Camden Wise kick (Drive: 5 plays, 37 yards, 1:17; James Madison 20–2)
- (13:55) MRSH – Jayden Harrison 94 yard kickoff return, Rece Verhoff kick (James Madison 20–9)

Statistics	JMU	MRSH
First downs	19	10
Plays–yards	69–405	62–169
Rushes–yards	36–131	32–-4
Passing yards	274	173
Passing: comp–att–int	22–33–1	17–30–1
Turnovers		
Time of possession	33:49	26:11

Team	Category	Player	Statistics
James Madison	Passing	Jordan McCloud	21/31, 264 yards, 1 TD, 1 INT
James Madison	Rushing	Jordan McCloud	6 carries, 69 yards, 1 TD
James Madison	Receiving	Reggie Brown	6 receptions, 126 yards, 1 TD
Marshall	Passing	Cam Fancher	17/30, 173 yards, 1 INT
Marshall	Rushing	Ethan Payne	20 carries, 62 yards
Marshall	Receiving	Jayden Harrison	4 receptions, 40 yards

=== at Coastal Carolina ===
Game Eight – Marshall Thundering Herd (4–3) at Coastal Carolina Chanticleers (4–3)

Quarter	1	2	3	4	Total
Thundering Herd	0	6	0	0	6
Chanticleers	10	17	0	7	34

at Brooks Stadium • Conway, South Carolina

- Date: Saturday, October 28, 2023
- Game time: 6:00 p.m. EDT
- Game weather: Sunny
- Game attendance: 21,324
- Referee: Marshall Lewis
- TV announcers (NFLN): Jason Ross Jr. (play-by-play), Tyoka Jackson (analyst)

Game information

First quarter

- (10:55) CCU – Kade Hensley 36 yard field goal (Drive:8 plays, 57 yards, 4:05; Coastal Carolina 3–0)
- (6:18) CCU – Jared Brown 30 yards pass from Jarrett Guest, Kade Hensley kick (Drive: 5 plays, 69 yards, 2:07; Coastal Carolina 10–0)

Second quarter

- (12:40) CCU – Kade Hensley 33 yard field goal (Drive: 11 plays, 66 yards, 6:06; Coastal Carolina 13–0)
- (7:23) MRSH – Rece Verhoff 23 yard field goal (Drive: 7 plays, 19 yards, 2:47; Coastal Carolina 13–3)
- (5:00) CCU – Jared Brown 59 yard pass from Jarrett Guest, Kade Hensley kick (Drive: 7 plays, 87 yards, 2:23; Coastal Carolina 20–3)
- (2:57) CCU – De'Andre Coleman 27 yard pass from Jarrett Guest, Kade Hensley kick (Drive: 2 plays, 27 yards, 0:11; Coastal Carolina 27–3)
- (0:03) MRSH – Rece Verhoff 44 yard field goal (Drive: 10 plays, 49 yards, 2:54; Coastal Carolina 27–6)

Third quarter

- No scoring plays

Fourth quarter

- (9:49) CCU – Reese White 1 yard run, Kade Hensley kick (Drive: 2 plays, 1 yard, 0:50; Coastal Carolina 34–6)

Statistics	MRSH	CCU
First downs	17	20
Plays–yards	71–283	62–427
Rushes–yards	26–81	40–145
Passing yards	202	282
Passing: comp–att–int	23–45–4	15–22–1
Turnovers		
Time of possession	27:53	32:07

Team	Category	Player	Statistics
Marshall	Passing	Cam Fancher	11/22, 125 yards, 2 INT
Marshall	Rushing	Rasheen Ali	12 carries, 52 yards
Marshall	Receiving	DeMarcus Harris	5 receptions, 61 yards
Coastal Carolina	Passing	Jarrett Guest	14/20, 289 yards, 3 TD, 1 INT
Coastal Carolina	Rushing	Ethan Vasko	5 carries, 37 yards
Coastal Carolina	Receiving	Jared Brown	5 receptions, 117 yards, 2 TD

=== at Appalachian State ===
Game Nine – Marshall Thundering Herd (4–4) at Appalachian State Mountaineers (4–4)

Quarter	1	2	3	4	Total
Thundering Herd	0	3	6	0	9
Mountaineers	0	21	7	3	31

at Kidd Brewer Stadium • Boone, North Carolina

- Date: Saturday, November 4, 2023
- Game time: 6:00 p.m. EDT
- Game weather: Sunny • Temperature: 60 °F (16 °C)
- Game attendance: 34,057
- Referee: Ted Pitts
- TV announcers (NFLN): Jason Ross Jr. (play-by-play), Tyoka Jackson (analyst)

Game information

First quarter

- No scoring plays

Second quarter

- (14:15) MRSH – Rece Verhoff 33 yard field goal (Drive: 7 plays, 59 yards, 3:04; Marshall 3–0)
- (10:52) APP – Kaedin Robinson 24 yard pass from Joey Aguilar, Michael Hughes kick (Drive: 7 plays, 75 yards, 3:19; Appalachian State 7–3)
- (8:33) APP – Milan Tucker 3 yard run, Michael Hughes kick (Drive: 3 plays, 17 yards, 1:25; Appalachian State 14–3)
- (1:26) APP – Michael Hetzel 19 yard pass from Joey Aguilar, Michael Hughes kick (Drive: 9 plays, 74 yards, 5:15; Appalachian State 21–3)

Third quarter

- (7:10) APP – Makai Jackson 29 yard pass from Joey Aguilar, Michael Hughes kick (Drive: 8 plays, 58 yards, 4:19; Appalachian State 28–3)
- (3:13) MRSH – Sean Sallis 10 yard pass from Cam Fancher, Two-Point Pass Conversion Failed (Drive: 7 plays, 80 yards, 3:57; Appalachian State 28–9)

Fourth quarter

- (4:01) APP – Michael Hughes 32 yard field goal (Drive: 9 plays, 61 yards, 5:49; Appalachian State 31–9)

Statistics	MRSH	APP
First downs	13	24
Plays–yards	50–252	67–377
Rushes–yards	25–108	40–148
Passing yards	144	229
Passing: comp–att–int	14–25–3	20–27–0
Turnovers		
Time of possession	24:20	35:40

Team	Category	Player	Statistics
Marshall	Passing	Cam Fancher	14/25, 144 yards, 1 TD, 3 INT
Marshall	Rushing	Rasheen Ali	13 carries, 74 yards
Marshall	Receiving	Jayden Harrison	1 reception, 35 yards
Appalachian State	Passing	Joey Aguilar	20/27, 229 yards, 3 TD
Appalachian State	Rushing	Joey Aguilar	10 carries, 44 yards
Appalachian State	Receiving	Kaedin Robinson	4 receptions, 55 yards, 1 TD

=== Georgia Southern ===
Game Ten – Georgia Southern Eagles (6–3) at Marshall Thundering Herd (4–5)

Quarter	1	2	3	4	Total
Eagles	3	17	6	7	33
Thundering Herd	10	7	7	14	38

at Joan C. Edwards Stadium • Huntington, West Virginia

- Date: Saturday, November 11, 2023
- Game time: 7:00 p.m. EST
- Game weather: Sunny
- Game attendance: 19,175
- Referee: Scott Broadway
- TV announcers (NFLN): Jason Ross Jr. (play-by-play), Tyoka Jackson (analyst)

Game information

First quarter

- (14:45) MRSH – Jayden Harrison 98 yard kickoff return, Rece Verhoff kick (Marshall 7–0)
- (6:15) GASO – Michael Lantz 35 yard field goal (Drive: 4 plays, 3 yards, 1:26; Marshall 7–3)
- (2:49) MRSH – Rece Verhoff 22 yard field goal (Drive: 6 plays, 71 yards, 3:26; Marshall 10–3)

Second quarter

- (11:15) GASO – Jaylon Barden 9 yard pass from Davis Brin, Michael Lantz kick (Drive: 8 plays, 52 yards, 3:32; Tied 10–10)
- (5:32) MRSH – Caleb McMillan 21 yard run, Rece Verhoff kick (Drive: 10 plays, 74 yards, 5:39; Marshall 17–10)
- (3:07) GASO – Dalen Cobb 47 yard pass from Davis Brin, Michael Lantz kick (Drive: 4 plays, 75 yards, 2:25; Tied 17–17)
- (0:12) GASO – Michael Lantz 38 yard field goal (Drive: 7 plays, 26 yards, 0:59; Georgia Southern 20–17)

Third quarter

- (6:51) GASO – Michael Lantz 40 yard field goal (Drive: 9 plays, 39 yards, 2:56; Georgia Southern 23–17)
- (5:06) MRSH – Rasheen Ali 2 yard run, Rece Verhoff kick (Drive: 4 plays, 70 yards, 1:45; Marshall 24–23)
- (1:56) GASO – Michael Lantz 21 yard field goal (Drive: 6 plays, 72 yards, 3:10; Georgia Southern 26–24)

Fourth quarter

- (10:51) MRSH – Rasheen Ali 55 yard run, Rece Verhoff kick (Drive: 1 play, 55 yards, 0:09; Marshall 31–26)
- (2:41) MRSH – Rasheen Ali 9 yard run, Rece Verhoff kick (Drive: 1 play, 9 yards, 0:06; Marshall 38–26)
- (0:50) GASO – Derwin Burgess 2 yard pass from Davis Brin, Michael Lantz kick (Drive: 12 plays, 61 yards, 1:46; Marshall 38–33)

Statistics	GASO	MRSH
First downs	18	14
Plays–yards	80–384	54–370
Rushes–yards	24–77	33–169
Passing yards	307	201
Passing: comp–att–int	29–56–0	15–21–1
Turnovers		
Time of possession	32:42	27:18

Team	Category	Player	Statistics
Georgia Southern	Passing	Davis Brin	29/54, 307 yards, 3 TD
Georgia Southern	Rushing	Jalen White	17 carries, 67 yards
Georgia Southern	Receiving	Jaylon Barden	6 receptions, 96 yards, 1 TD
Marshall	Passing	Cole Pennington	15/20, 201 yards, 1 INT
Marshall	Rushing	Rasheen Ali	24 carries, 165 yards, 3 TD
Marshall	Receiving	DeMarcus Harris	4 receptions, 147 yards

=== at South Alabama ===
Game Eleven – Marshall Thundering Herd (5–5) at South Alabama Jaguars (5–5)

Quarter	1	2	3	4	Total
Thundering Herd	0	0	0	0	0
Jaguars	14	7	0	7	28

at Hancock Whitney Stadium • Mobile, Alabama

- Date: Saturday, November 18, 2023
- Game time: 5:00 p.m. EDT
- Game weather: Sunny • Temperature: 71 °F (22 °C) • Wind: S 8 mph
- Game attendance: 14,105
- Referee: Marshall Lewis
- TV announcers (ESPN+): Pat Greenwood (play-by-play) and Charlie Harrison (analyst)

Game information

First Quarter

- (10:37) USA – Diego Guajardo 47-yard field goal (Drive: 7 plays, 22 yards, 3:00; South Alabama 3–0)
- (8:38) USA – Diego Guajardo 43-yard field goal (Drive: 4 plays, 6 yards, 1:22; South Alabama 6–0)
- (5:02) USA – Jamaal Pritchett 25-yard pass from Carter Bradley, La'Damian Webb pass (Drive: 4 plays, 51 yards, 1:49; South Alabama 14–0)

Second Quarter

- (3:19) USA – La'Damian Webb 8-yard pass from Carter Bradley, Diego Guajardo kick (Drive: 6 plays, 50 yards, 3:04; South Alabama 21–0)

Third Quarter

No scoring plays

Fourth Quarter

- (10:15) USA – La'Damian Webb 6-yard run, Diego Guajardo kick (Drive: 6 plays, 54 yards, 3:51; South Alabama 28–0)

Statistics	MRSH	USA
First downs	10	20
Plays–yards	56–201	72–393
Rushes–yards	2–42	10–197
Passing yards	159	196
Passing: comp–att–int	22–36–3	19–26–0
Turnovers		
Time of possession	23:33	36:27

Team	Category	Player	Statistics
Marshall	Passing	Cole Pennington	22/36, 159 yards, 3 INT
Marshall	Rushing	Rasheen Ali	16 carries, 55 yards
Marshall	Receiving	Rasheen Ali	4 receptions, 41 yards
South Alabama	Passing	Carter Bradley	17/23, 176 yards, 2 TD
South Alabama	Rushing	La'Damian Webb	24 carries, 117 yards, TD
South Alabama	Receiving	Caullin Lacy	9 receptions, 126 yards

=== Arkansas State ===
Game Twelve – Arkansas State Red Wolves (6–5) at Marshall Thundering Herd (5–6)

Quarter	1	2	3	4	Total
Red Wolves	0	7	7	7	21
Thundering Herd	14	14	7	0	35

at Joan C. Edwards Stadium • Huntington, West Virginia

- Date: Saturday, November 25, 2023
- Game time: 3:30 p.m. EDT
- Game weather: Sunny
- Game attendance: 18,673
- Referee: Jeremy Parker
- TV: ESPN+

Game information

First quarter

- (8:05) MRSH – Chuck Montgomery 9 yard pass from Cam Fancher, Rece Verhoff kick (Drive: 4 plays, 70 yards, 1:32; Marshall 7–0)
- (1:28) MRSH – Chuck Montgomery 15 yard pass from Cam Fancher, Rece Verhoff kick (Drive: 10 plays, 74 yards, 4:35; Marshall 14–0)

Second quarter

- (11:31) MRSH – Cam Fancher 7 yard run, Rece Verhoff kick (Drive: 4 plays, 99 yards, 1:31; Marshall 21–0)
- (6:15) MRSH – Caleb McMillan 21 yard pass from Cam Fancher, Rece Verhoff kick (Drive: 6 plays, 33 yards, 3:23; Marshall 28–0)
- (1:19) ARST – Ja'Quez Cross 3 yard run, Dominic Zvada kick (Drive: 6 plays, 62 yards, 1:12; Marshall 28–7)

Third quarter

- (6:58) MRSH – Cam Fancher 3 yard run, Rece Verhoff kick (Drive: 2 plays, 67 yards, 0:35; Marshall 35–7)
- (2:50) ARST – Courtney Jackson 60 yard punt return, Dominic Zvada kick (Marshall 35–14)

Fourth quarter

- (2:54) ARST – Courtney Jackson 2 yard pass from Jaylen Raynor, Dominic Zvada kick (Drive: 2 plays, 15 yards, 0:07; Marshall 35–21)

Statistics	ARST	MRSH
First downs	20	23
Plays–yards	67–305	75–493
Rushes–yards	29–42	53–279
Passing yards	263	214
Passing: comp–att–int	19–38–1	16–22–0
Turnovers		
Time of possession	23:04	36:56

Team	Category	Player	Statistics
Arkansas State	Passing	Jaylen Raynor	19/38, 263 yards, 1 TD, 1 INT
Arkansas State	Rushing	Ja'Quez Cross	11 carries, 27 yards, 1 TD
Arkansas State	Receiving	Corey Rucker	5 receptions, 87 yards
Marshall	Passing	Cam Fancher	16/22, 214 yards, 3 TD
Marshall	Rushing	Ethan Payne	19 carries, 113 yards
Marshall	Receiving	Chuck Montgomery	4 receptions, 51 yards, 2 TD

=== vs UTSA ===
2023 Scooter's Coffee Frisco Bowl – UTSA Roadrunners (8–4) vs. Marshall Thundering Herd (6–6)

Quarter	1	2	3	4	Total
UTSA	0	21	7	7	35
Marshall	7	10	0	0	17

at Toyota Stadium • Frisco, Texas

- Date: Saturday, December 19, 2023
- Game time: 8:00 p.m. CST
- Game weather: Clear • Temperature: 50 °F (10 °C) • Wind: 11 mph (18 km/h) SE
- Game attendance: 11,215
- Referee: Rodney Burnette
- TV announcers (ESPN): Jorge Sedano (play-by-play), Rocky Boiman (analyst), and Dawn Davenport (sideline)
- Box score

Game information

First Quarter

- (8:52) MU – Ethan Payne 1 yard run, Rece Verhoff kick (Drive: 2 plays, 7 yards, 0:22; Marshall 7–0)

Second Quarter

- (14:48) MU – Rasheen Ali 64 yard run, Rece Verhoff kick (Drive: 3 plays, 73 yards, 1:12; Marshall 14–0)
- (11:26) UTSA – Robert Henry 3 yard run, Chase Allen kick (Drive: 8 plays, 62 yards, 3:22; Marshall 14–7)
- (8:53) UTSA – Joshua Cephus 44 yard pass from Owen McCown, Chase Allen kick (Drive: 4 plays, 65 yards, 1:18; Tied 14–14)
- (5:12) MU – Rece Verhoff 44 yard field goal (Drive: 6 plays, 49 yards, 3:41; Marshall 17–14)
- (0:47) UTSA – Robert Henry 1 yard run, Chase Allen kick (Drive: 13 plays, 75 yards, 4:25; UTSA 21–17)

Third Quarter

- (4:49) UTSA – David Amador 19 yard pass from Owen McCown, Chase Allen kick (Drive: 10 plays, 63 yards, 3:59; UTSA 28–17)

Fourth Quarter

- (8:39) UTSA – Rocko Griffin 17 yard run, Chase Allen kick (Drive: 1 play, 17 yards, 0:07; UTSA 35–17)

Statistics	UTSA	MRSH
First downs	20	13
Plays–yards	72–386	68–367
Rushes–yards	41–135	34–109
Passing yards	251	258
Passing: comp–att–int	22–31–2	15–34–1
Turnovers		
Time of possession	29:59	30:01

Team	Category	Player	Statistics
UTSA	Passing	Owen McCown	22/31, 251 yards, 2 TD, 2 INT
UTSA	Rushing	Rocko Griffin	11 carries, 43 yards, TD
UTSA	Receiving	Joshua Cephus	7 receptions, 102 yards, TD
Marshall	Passing	Cole Pennington	15/33, 258 yards
Marshall	Rushing	Rasheen Ali	9 carries, 92 yards, TD
Marshall	Receiving	Jayden Harrison	6 receptions, 132 yards
