= 2023 Frisco Bowl =

Postseason college football bowl game

2023 Scooter's Coffee Frisco Bowl
- 6th Frisco Bowl
UTSA Roadrunners	Marshall Thundering Herd
(8–4)	(6–6)
The American	Sun Belt
35	17
Head coach: Jeff Traylor	Head coach: Charles Huff
	1	2	3	4	Total
UTSA	0	21	7	7	35
Marshall	7	10	0	0	17
- Date: December 19, 2023
- Season: 2023
- Stadium: Toyota Stadium
- Location: Frisco, Texas
- MVP: Joshua Cephus (WR, UTSA) & Kam Alexander (CB, UTSA)
- Favorite: UTSA by 8
- Referee: Rodney Burnette (CUSA)
- Attendance: 11,215
- Payout: US$$650,000

United States TV coverage
- Network: ESPN
- Announcers: Jorge Sedano (play-by-play), Rocky Boiman (analyst), and Dawn Davenport (sideline)

International TV coverage
- Network: ESPN Deportes

The 2023 Frisco Bowl was a college football bowl game played on December 19, 2023, at Toyota Stadium located in Frisco, Texas. The sixth annual Frisco Bowl featured the UTSA Roadrunners from the American Athletic Conference and the Marshall Thundering Herd from the Sun Belt Conference. The game began at approximately 8:00 p.m. CST and was aired on ESPN. The Frisco Bowl was one of the 2023–24 bowl games concluding the 2023 FBS football season. The game was sponsored by coffeehouse chain Scooter's Coffee and was officially known as the Scooter's Coffee Frisco Bowl.

== Teams ==
Consistent with conference tie-ins, the game featured the UTSA Roadrunners from the American Athletic Conference (The American or AAC), and the Marshall Thundering Herd from the Sun Belt Conference. This was the fourth all-time meeting between Marshall and UTSA; Marshall entered the game leading the series, 2–1. The Thundering Herd and Roadrunners were both members of Conference USA (CUSA) prior to the Thundering Herd joining the Sun Belt in 2022 and the Roadrunners joining the AAC in 2023.

=== Marshall Thundering Herd ===
The Thundering Herd started the season hot, winning their first four games including a victory over Power Five for Virginia Tech. However, the Herd then had a five-game losing streak, with all but one of the losses being by two scores or more. Heading into the final week of the regular season, the Herd sat at 5–6 and needed a victory over Arkansas State to clinch bowl eligibility, which they managed to do behind a five-touchdown game from Cam Fancher to finish the season with a record of 6–6.

This was Marshall's first appearance in the Frisco Bowl.

=== UTSA Roadrunners ===
Coming off a CUSA title by the 2022 Roadrunners, UTSA returned quarterback Frank Harris for its first season in The American. UTSA started the season 1–3, with Harris missing two games due to suffering a turf toe injury. However, the Roadrunners roared back to win their first seven games of conference play upon Harris' return, setting up a key game in Week 13 against Tulane. Behind a 16-point second quarter, Tulane defeated UTSA, 29–16, earning the right to play in the AAC Championship Game, while UTSA finished third in the conference. Harris suffered a shoulder injury in the Tulane game that kept him out of the bowl game. The Roadrunners entered the Frisco Bowl with a record of 8–4.

This was UTSA's second Frisco Bowl appearance, joining San Diego State as the only teams to appear in multiple Frisco Bowls. The Roadrunners appeared in, and lost, the 2021 Frisco Bowl.

== Game summary ==
2023 Scooter's Coffee Frisco Bowl

Quarter	1	2	3	4	Total
UTSA	0	21	7	7	35
Marshall	7	10	0	0	17

at Toyota Stadium • Frisco, Texas

- Date: Saturday, December 19, 2023
- Game time: 8:00 p.m. CST
- Game weather: Clear • Temperature: 50 °F (10 °C) • Wind: 11 mph (18 km/h) SE
- Game attendance: 11,215
- Referee: Rodney Burnette
- TV announcers (ESPN): Jorge Sedano (play-by-play), Rocky Boiman (analyst), and Dawn Davenport (sideline)
- Box score

Game information

First Quarter

- (8:52) MU – Ethan Payne 1 yard run, Rece Verhoff kick (Drive: 2 plays, 7 yards, 0:22; Marshall 7–0)

Second Quarter

- (14:48) MU – Rasheen Ali 64 yard run, Rece Verhoff kick (Drive: 3 plays, 73 yards, 1:12; Marshall 14–0)
- (11:26) UTSA – Robert Henry 3 yard run, Chase Allen kick (Drive: 8 plays, 62 yards, 3:22; Marshall 14–7)
- (8:53) UTSA – Joshua Cephus 44 yard pass from Owen McCown, Chase Allen kick (Drive: 4 plays, 65 yards, 1:18; Tied 14–14)
- (5:12) MU – Rece Verhoff 44 yard field goal (Drive: 6 plays, 49 yards, 3:41; Marshall 17–14)
- (0:47) UTSA – Robert Henry 1 yard run, Chase Allen kick (Drive: 13 plays, 75 yards, 4:25; UTSA 21–17)

Third Quarter

- (4:49) UTSA – David Amador 19 yard pass from Owen McCown, Chase Allen kick (Drive: 10 plays, 63 yards, 3:59; UTSA 28–17)

Fourth Quarter

- (8:39) UTSA – Rocko Griffin 17 yard run, Chase Allen kick (Drive: 1 play, 17 yards, 0:07; UTSA 35–17)

=== Statistics ===
Statistics	UTSA	MRSH
First downs	20	13
Plays–yards	72–386	68–367
Rushes–yards	41–135	34–109
Passing yards	251	258
Passing: comp–att–int	22–31–2	15–34–1
Time of possession	29:59	30:01

Team	Category	Player	Statistics
UTSA	Passing	Owen McCown	22/31, 251 yards, 2 TD, 2 INT
UTSA	Rushing	Rocko Griffin	11 carries, 43 yards, TD
UTSA	Receiving	Joshua Cephus	7 receptions, 102 yards, TD
Marshall	Passing	Cole Pennington	15/33, 258 yards
Marshall	Rushing	Rasheen Ali	9 carries, 92 yards, TD
Marshall	Receiving	Jayden Harrison	6 receptions, 132 yards
