= 2024 Houston Cougars football team =

American college football season

2024 Houston Cougars football
- Conference: Big 12 Conference
- Record: 4–8 (3–6 Big 12)
- Head coach: Willie Fritz (1st season)
- Offensive coordinator: Kevin Barbay (1st season; first 11 games); Shawn Bell (interim; final game)
- Offensive scheme: Pro spread
- Defensive coordinator: Shiel Wood (1st season)
- Base defense: 3–4
- Home stadium: TDECU Stadium

2024 Big 12 Conference football standings
| | Conf. | | | Overall |
| Team | W | | L | W | | L |
|---|---|---|---|---|---|---|
| No. 7 Arizona State y$^ | 7 | – | 2 | 11 | – | 3 |
| No. 15 Iowa State y | 7 | – | 2 | 11 | – | 3 |
| No. 13 BYU | 7 | – | 2 | 11 | – | 2 |
| No. 25 Colorado | 7 | – | 2 | 9 | – | 4 |
| Baylor | 6 | – | 3 | 8 | – | 5 |
| TCU | 6 | – | 3 | 9 | – | 4 |
| Texas Tech | 6 | – | 3 | 8 | – | 5 |
| Kansas State | 5 | – | 4 | 9 | – | 4 |
| West Virginia | 5 | – | 4 | 6 | – | 7 |
| Kansas | 4 | – | 5 | 5 | – | 7 |
| Cincinnati | 3 | – | 6 | 5 | – | 7 |
| Houston | 3 | – | 6 | 4 | – | 8 |
| Utah | 2 | – | 7 | 5 | – | 7 |
| UCF | 2 | – | 7 | 4 | – | 8 |
| Arizona | 2 | – | 7 | 4 | – | 8 |
| Oklahoma State | 0 | – | 9 | 3 | – | 9 |
Championship: Arizona State 45, Iowa State 19
^ – College Football Playoff participant; $ – Conference champion; y – Championship game participant; Rankings from AP Poll

The 2024 Houston Cougars football team represented the University of Houston in the Big 12 Conference during the 2024 NCAA Division I FBS football season. The Cougars were led by Willie Fritz in his first season as their head coach. The Cougars played their home games at TDECU Stadium in Houston, Texas.

== Offseason ==
=== Transfers ===
==== Outgoing ====
| Player | Position | Destination |
|---|---|---|
| Bryan Henry | TE | Abilene Christian |
| Christopher Pearson | S | Arkansas State |
| Jett Huff | QB | Central Oklahoma |
| Kamsi Arinze | LB | Coffeyville CC |
| Tyler Johnson | IOL | Colorado |
| Chidozie Nwankwo | DL | Colorado |
| Aaron Willis | LB | Delaware State |
| Karson Jones | OT | East Carolina |
| Moses Alexander | CB | Eastern Illinois |
| CJ Nelson | WR | Eastern Illinois |
| Logan Compton | TE | Incarnate Word |
| Reuben Unije | OT | Louisville |
| Ja'koby Banks | WR | Memphis |
| Sam Brown | WR | Miami (FL) |
| Aubrey Smith | LB | Navarro |
| Tevin Shaw | IOL | New Mexico |
| Justin Beadles | DL | New Mexico State |
| Dalton Carnes | WR | North Texas |
| Darson Herman | TE | North Texas |
| Isaiah Hamilton | CB | Ole Miss |
| Jamaree Caldwell | DL | Oregon |
| Lucas Coley | QB | Prairie View A&M |
| Michael Patterson | CB | Stephen F. Austin |
| Hakeem Ajijolaiya | DL | TCU |
| Matthew Golden | WR | Texas |
| Amipeleasi Langi | DL | Texas State |
| Treylin Payne | LB | Texas State |
| Mikal Harrison-Pilot | WR | Texas Tech |
| Brandon Campbell | RB | UMass |
| Joshua Cobbs | WR | USF |
| Jaylen Garth | OT | UTSA |
| Sergio Snider | RB | Unknown |
| Jalyn Stanford | S | Unknown |

==== Incoming ====
| Player | Position | Previous School |
|---|---|---|
| J.D. Rhym | CB | Auburn |
| Quindario Lee | DL | Central Michigan |
| Teagan Wilk | S | East Carolina |
| Mekhi Mews | WR | Georgia |
| Carlos Allen Jr. | DL | Kennesaw State |
| Zeon Chriss | QB | Louisiana |
| Kendre Gant | LB | Louisiana |
| Sam Secrest | IOL | Louisville |
| Michael Batton | LB | Louisiana–Monroe |
| Dakota White | IOL | Louisiana Tech |
| Christian Brathwaite | LB | LSU |
| Maliq Carr | TE | Michigan State |
| Gabe Peterson | LB | New Mexico State |
| Cedric Melton | OT | Ole Miss |
| Bryan Massey | S | SMU |
| Kriston Davis | CB | Southern |
| Jeremiah Wilson | CB | Syracuse |
| Jayden York | TE | Texas Tech |
| Keith Cooper | DL | Tulane |
| Corey Platt Jr. | LB | Tulane |
| Kentrell Webb | S | Tulane |
| Everitt Rogers | DL | Tulsa |
| Marquis Shoulders | WR | Tulsa |
| Devan Williams | WR | Tulsa |
| Jake Wiley | IOL | UCLA |
| Jack Raney | K | UC Davis |
| Ajani Carter | CB | Utah State |
| Hershey McLaurin | S | West Virginia |

==== Coaching staff additions ====
| Name | New Position | Previous Team | Previous Position | Source |
|---|---|---|---|---|
| Willie Fritz | Head Coach | Tulane | Head Coach | |
| Kevin Barbay | Offensive Coordinator/Tight Ends | Mississippi State | Offensive Coordinator/Quarterbacks | |
| Shiel Wood | Defensive Coordinator/Linebackers | Tulane | Defensive Coordinator/Linebackers | |
| Derrick Sherman | Assistant Head Coach/Wide Receivers | Tulane | Wide Receivers | |
| Shawn Bell | Quarterbacks | Baylor | Quarterbacks | |
| Joshua Christian-Young | Defensive Backs | Tulane | Defensive Backs | |
| Zac Etheridge | Defensive Backs | Auburn | Associate Head Coach/Secondary | |
| James Ross III | Defensive Ends/Outside Linebackers | Tulane | Senior Defensive Analyst | |
| Jordy Joseph | Running Backs | Southern Miss | Quarterbacks | |
| Mike Krysl | Special Teams | Tulane | Special Teams Analyst | |
| Oscar Giles | Defensive Line | Wyoming | Associate Head Coach/Defensive Run-Game Coordinator/Defensive Tackles/Freshman Head Coach | |

==== Coaching staff departures ====
| Name | Position | New Team | New Position | Source |
|---|---|---|---|---|
| Dana Holgorsen | Head Coach | TCU | Defensive analyst | |
| Doug Belk | Defensive Coordinator | USC | Defensive Backs | |
| Daikiel Shorts | Wide Receivers | Kentucky | Wide Receivers | |
| Mike Jinks | Assistant Head Coach/Running Backs | – | – | – |
| Corby Meekins | Tight Ends/Inside Receivers | Lutheran South | Head Coach | |
| Brian Early | Defensive Line | Missouri | Defensive Line/Edge | |

== Schedule ==
| Date | Time | Opponent | Site | TV | Result | Attendance |
|---|---|---|---|---|---|---|
| August 31 | 6:00 p.m. | UNLV* | TDECU Stadium; Houston, TX | FS1 | L 7–27 | 25,750 |
| September 7 | 6:45 p.m. | at No. 15 Oklahoma* | Gaylord Family Oklahoma Memorial Stadium; Norman, OK | SECN | L 12–16 | 83,653 |
| September 14 | 7:00 p.m. | Rice* | TDECU Stadium; Houston, TX (rivalry) | ESPN+ | W 33–7 | 28,146 |
| September 21 | 11:00 a.m. | at Cincinnati | Nippert Stadium; Cincinnati, OH | FS1 | L 0–34 | 38,007 |
| September 28 | 6:00 p.m. | No. 18 Iowa State | TDECU Stadium; Houston, TX | FS1 | L 0–20 | 25,138 |
| October 4 | 6:30 p.m. | at TCU | Amon G. Carter Stadium; Fort Worth, TX | ESPN | W 30–19 | 44,211 |
| October 19 | 2:30 p.m. | at Kansas | Arrowhead Stadium; Kansas City, MO | ESPN+ | L 14–42 | 38,619 |
| October 26 | 6:00 p.m. | Utah^{†} | TDECU Stadium; Houston, TX | ESPN+ | W 17–14 | 28,251 |
| November 2 | 2:30 p.m. | No. 17 Kansas State | TDECU Stadium; Houston, TX | FOX | W 24–19 | 23,085 |
| November 15 | 9:15 p.m. | at Arizona | Arizona Stadium; Tucson, AZ | FS1 | L 3–27 | 38,538 |
| November 23 | 6:00 p.m. | Baylor | TDECU Stadium; Houston, TX (rivalry) | FS1 | L 10–20 | 34,166 |
| November 30 | 9:15 p.m. | at No. 19 BYU | LaVell Edwards Stadium; Provo, UT | ESPN | L 18–30 | 59,213 |
*Non-conference game; ^{†}Homecoming; Rankings from AP Poll (and CFP Rankings, after November 5) - Released prior to game; All times are in Central time

== Game summaries ==
=== vs UNLV ===
UNLV Rebels (0–0) vs Houston Cougars (0–0) – Game summary

| Quarter | 1 | 2 | 3 | 4 | Total |
|---|---|---|---|---|---|
| Rebels | 7 | 7 | 10 | 3 | 27 |
| Cougars | 0 | 0 | 0 | 7 | 7 |

at TDECU Stadium • Houston, TX

- Date: August 31, 2024
- Game time: 6:00 p.m. CDT
- Game weather: Cloudy, 90 °F (32 °C)
- Game attendance: 25,750
- Referee: Michael VanderVelde
- TV announcers (FS1): Alex Faust (play-by-play) and Robert Smith (analyst)

Game information

First quarter

- (8:10) UNLV – Jacob De Jesus 13-yard pass from Matthew Sluka, Caden Chittenden kick (Drive: 5 plays, 75 yards, 1:26; UNLV 7–0)

Second quarter

- (12:49) UNLV – Jacob De Jesus 24-yard pass from Matthew Sluka, Caden Chittenden kick (Drive: 5 plays, 55 yards, 1:58; UNLV 14–0)

Third quarter

- (9:49) UNLV – Caden Chittenden 40-yard field goal (Drive: 9 plays, 27 yards, 3:57; UNLV 17–0)
- (5:23) UNLV – Jalen Catalon 36-yard interception return, Caden Chittenden kick (UNLV 24–0)

Fourth quarter

- (5:00) UNLV – Caden Chittenden 34-yard field goal (Drive: 4 plays, 3 yards, 2:14; UNLV 27–0)
- (1:00) HOU – Joseph Manjack IV 2-yard pass from Ui Ale, Joseph Kim kick (Drive: 12 plays, 90 yards, 3:51; UNLV 27–7)

| Statistics | UNLV | HOU |
|---|---|---|
| First downs | 14 | 14 |
| Total yards | 308 | 247 |
| Rushing yards | 195 | 38 |
| Passing yards | 113 | 209 |
| Passing: Comp–Att–Int | 7–14–1 | 22–38–2 |
| Time of possession | 31:27 | 28:33 |

| Team | Category | Player | Statistics |
|---|---|---|---|
| UNLV | Passing | Matthew Sluka | 6/13, 71 yards, 2 TD, INT |
| UNLV | Rushing | Michael Allen | 10 carries, 65 yards |
| UNLV | Receiving | Jaden Bradley | 2 receptions, 60 yards |
| Houston | Passing | Donovan Smith | 15/30, 135 yards, 2 INT |
| Houston | Rushing | Parker Jenkins | 2 carries, 17 yards |
| Houston | Receiving | Mekhi Mews | 3 receptions, 57 yards |

=== at No. 15 Oklahoma ===
Houston Cougars (0–1) at No. 15 Oklahoma Sooners (1–0) – Game summary

| Quarter | 1 | 2 | 3 | 4 | Total |
|---|---|---|---|---|---|
| Cougars | 3 | 3 | 6 | 0 | 12 |
| No. 15 Sooners | 7 | 7 | 0 | 2 | 16 |

at Gaylord Family Oklahoma Memorial Stadium • Norman, OK

- Date: September 7, 2024
- Game time: 6:45 p.m. CDT
- Game weather: Sunny, 78 °F (26 °C)
- Game attendance: 83,653
- Referee: Stephen Baron
- TV announcers (SEC Network): Tom Hart (play-by-play), Jordan Rodgers (analyst), and Cole Cubelic (sideline)

Game information

First quarter

- (12:59) OKLA – Brenen Thompson 10-yard pass from Jackson Arnold, Tyler Keltner kick (Drive: 1 play, 10 yards, 0:06; Oklahoma 7–0)
- (4:29) HOU – Joseph Kim 43-yard field goal (Drive: 12 plays, 63 yards, 8:25; Oklahoma 7–3)

Second quarter

- (12:28) OKLA – Jake Roberts 11-yard pass from Jackson Arnold, Tyler Keltner kick (Drive: 8 plays, 81 yards, 3:11; Oklahoma 14–3)
- (0:00) HOU – Joseph Kim 44-yard field goal (Drive: 6 plays, 55 yards, 1:17; Oklahoma 14–6)

Third quarter

- (13:15) HOU – Joseph Manjack IV 44-yard pass from Donovan Smith, two-point conversion failed (Drive: 4 plays, 75 yards, 1:45; Oklahoma 14–12)

Fourth quarter

- (1:42) OKLA – Gracen Halton Safety (Drive: 1 play -5 yards, 0:04; Oklahoma 16–12)

| Statistics | HOU | OU |
|---|---|---|
| First downs | 18 | 15 |
| Total yards | 318 | 249 |
| Rushing yards | 58 | 75 |
| Passing yards | 260 | 174 |
| Passing: Comp–Att–Int | 24–28–1 | 19–32–1 |
| Time of possession | 35:03 | 24:57 |

| Team | Category | Player | Statistics |
|---|---|---|---|
| Houston | Passing | Donovan Smith | 24/28, 260 yards, TD, INT |
| Houston | Rushing | Stacy Sneed | 11 carries, 33 yards |
| Houston | Receiving | Joseph Manjack IV | 3 receptions, 72 yards, TD |
| Oklahoma | Passing | Jackson Arnold | 19/32, 174 yards, 2 TD, INT |
| Oklahoma | Rushing | Jovantae Barnes | 12 carries, 40 yards |
| Oklahoma | Receiving | Deion Burks | 9 receptions, 53 yards |

=== vs Rice (rivalry) ===
Rice Owls (1–1) vs Houston Cougars (0–2) – Game summary

| Quarter | 1 | 2 | 3 | 4 | Total |
|---|---|---|---|---|---|
| Owls | 0 | 0 | 0 | 7 | 7 |
| Cougars | 14 | 6 | 6 | 7 | 33 |

at TDECU Stadium • Houston, TX

- Date: September 14, 2024
- Game time: 7:00 p.m. CDT
- Game weather: Clear, 92 °F (33 °C)
- Game attendance: 28,146
- Referee: Kevin Boitmann
- TV announcers (ESPN+): Lowell Galindo (play-by-play), Fozzy Whittaker (analyst), and Tori Petry (sideline)

Game information

First quarter

- (5:30) HOU – Stacy Sneed 65-yard run, Joseph Kim kick (Drive: 2 plays, 75 yards, 0:34; Houston 7–0)
- (3:49) HOU – Mekhi Mews 75-yard punt return, Joseph Kim kick (Drive: 3 plays, 7 yards, 1:41; Houston 14–0)

Second quarter

- (7:29) HOU – Stephon Johnson 44-yard pass from Donovan Smith, Joseph Kim PAT failed (Drive: 1 play, 44 yards, 0:11; Houston 20–0)

Third quarter

- (2:24) HOU – Donovan Smith 1-yard run, two-point conversion failed (Drive: 1 play, 1 yard, 0:05; Houston 26–0)

Fourth quarter

- (7:10) HOU – Donovan Smith 37-yard run, Joseph Kim kick (Drive: 7 plays, 56 yards, 3:21; Houston 33–0)
- (1:08) RICE – Dean Connors 4-yard run, Enock Gota kick (Drive: 12 plays, 70 yards, 5:56; Houston 33–7)

| Statistics | RICE | HOU |
|---|---|---|
| First downs | 9 | 16 |
| Total yards | 159 | 379 |
| Rushing yards | 75 | 237 |
| Passing yards | 84 | 142 |
| Passing: Comp–Att–Int | 16–27–1 | 12–21–0 |
| Time of possession | 28:03 | 31:57 |

| Team | Category | Player | Statistics |
|---|---|---|---|
| Rice | Passing | E. J. Warner | 12/21, 50 yards, INT |
| Rice | Rushing | Dean Connors | 11 carries, 32 yards, TD |
| Rice | Receiving | Christian Francisco | 2 receptions, 26 yards |
| Houston | Passing | Donovan Smith | 12/21, 142 yards, TD |
| Houston | Rushing | Stacy Sneed | 7 carries, 82 yards, TD |
| Houston | Receiving | Stephon Johnson | 1 reception, 44 yards, TD |

=== at Cincinnati ===
Houston Cougars (1–2) at Cincinnati Bearcats (2–1) – Game summary

| Quarter | 1 | 2 | 3 | 4 | Total |
|---|---|---|---|---|---|
| Cougars | 0 | 0 | 0 | 0 | 0 |
| Bearcats | 14 | 10 | 7 | 3 | 34 |

at Nippert Stadium • Cincinnati, OH

- Date: September 21, 2024
- Game time: 11:00 a.m. CDT
- Game weather: Sunny • Temperature: 81 °F (27 °C) • Wind: NW at 2 miles per hour (3.2 km/h)
- Game attendance: 38,007
- Referee: David Alvarez
- TV announcers (FS1): Dan Hellie (play-by-play) and Petros Papadakis (analyst)

Game information

First quarter

- (10:46) CIN – Xzavier Henderson 19-yard pass from Brendan Sorsby, Nathan Hawks kick (Drive: 3 plays, 45 yards, 1:19; Cincinnati 7–0)
- (2:57) CIN – Corey Kiner 44-yard run, Nathan Hawks kick (Drive: 4 plays, 80 yards, 2:17; Cincinnati 14–0)

Second quarter

- (6:27) CIN – Xzavier Henderson 15-yard pass from Brendan Sorsby, Nathan Hawks kick (Drive: 12 plays, 80 yards, 7:11; Cincinnati 21–0)
- (1:51) CIN – Nathan Hawks 46-yard field goal (Drive: 6 plays, 25 yards, 2:32; Cincinnati 24–0)

Third quarter

- (9:09) CIN – Brendan Sorsby 8-yard run, Nathan Hawks kick (Drive: 8 plays, 89 yards, 4:00; Cincinnati 31–0)

Fourth quarter

- (3:47) CIN – Nathan Hawks 34-yard field goal (Drive: 15 plays, 52 yards, 9:51; Cincinnati 34–0)

| Statistics | HOU | CIN |
|---|---|---|
| First downs | 12 | 22 |
| Total yards | 233 | 362 |
| Rushing yards | 141 | 149 |
| Passing yards | 92 | 213 |
| Passing: Comp–Att–Int | 13–21–1 | 15–19–0 |
| Time of possession | 26:26 | 33:34 |

| Team | Category | Player | Statistics |
|---|---|---|---|
| Houston | Passing | Donovan Smith | 11/16, 73 yards, INT |
| Houston | Rushing | Re'Shaun Sanford II | 6 carries, 62 yards |
| Houston | Receiving | Joseph Manjack IV | 2 receptions, 51 yards |
| Cincinnati | Passing | Brendan Sorsby | 12/15, 188 yards, 2 TD |
| Cincinnati | Rushing | Corey Kiner | 16 carries, 78 yards, TD |
| Cincinnati | Receiving | Sterling Berkhalter | 3 receptions, 60 yards |

=== vs No. 18 Iowa State ===
No. 18 Iowa State Cyclones (3–0) vs Houston Cougars (1–3) – Game summary

| Quarter | 1 | 2 | 3 | 4 | Total |
|---|---|---|---|---|---|
| No. 18 Cyclones | 3 | 0 | 7 | 10 | 20 |
| Cougars | 0 | 0 | 0 | 0 | 0 |

at TDECU Stadium • Houston, TX

- Date: September 28, 2024
- Game time: 6:00 p.m.
- Game weather: Sunny • Temperature: 92 °F (33 °C) • Wind: NW 10 mph
- Game attendance: 25,138
- Referee: Hank Johns
- TV announcers (FS1): Eric Collins (play-by-play) and Spencer Tillman (analyst)

Game information

First quarter

- (7:06) ISU – Kyle Konrardy 23-yard field goal (Drive: 11 plays, 65 yards, 5:25; Iowa State 3–0)

Second quarter

No scoring plays

Third quarter

- (2:12) ISU – Jayden Higgins 12-yard pass from Rocco Becht, Kyle Konrardy kick (Drive: 7 plays, 80 yards, 2:31; Iowa State 10–0)

Fourth quarter

- (11:39) ISU – Kyle Konrardy 34-yard field goal (Drive: 7 plays, 31 yards, 4:01; Iowa State 13–0)
- (5:39) ISU – Abu Sama 77-yard run, Kyle Konrardy kick (Drive: 2 plays, 80 yards, 0:59; Iowa State 20–0)

| Statistics | ISU | HOU |
|---|---|---|
| First downs | 19 | 11 |
| Total yards | 393 | 241 |
| Rushing yards | 240 | 169 |
| Passing yards | 153 | 72 |
| Passing: Comp–Att–Int | 17–28–0 | 9–16–2 |
| Time of possession | 34:55 | 25:05 |

| Team | Category | Player | Statistics |
|---|---|---|---|
| Iowa State | Passing | Rocco Becht | 17/28, 153 yards, TD |
| Iowa State | Rushing | Abu Sama | 11 carries, 101 yards, TD |
| Iowa State | Receiving | Jayden Higgins | 8 receptions, 79 yards, TD |
| Houston | Passing | Donovan Smith | 8/12, 71 yards, INT |
| Houston | Rushing | Stacy Sneed | 10 carries, 79 yards |
| Houston | Receiving | Stephon Johnson | 4 receptions, 42 yards |

=== at TCU ===
Houston Cougars (1–4) at TCU Horned Frogs (3–2) – Game summary

| Quarter | 1 | 2 | 3 | 4 | Total |
|---|---|---|---|---|---|
| Cougars | 7 | 17 | 0 | 6 | 30 |
| Horned Frogs | 0 | 6 | 6 | 7 | 19 |

at Amon G. Carter Stadium • Fort Worth, TX

- Date: October 4, 2024
- Game time: 6:30 p.m. CDT
- Game weather: Sunny • Temperature: 88 °F (31 °C) • Wind: NE 9 mph
- Game attendance: 44,211
- Referee: Kevin Mar
- TV announcers (ESPN): Anish Shroff (play-by-play), Andre Ware (analyst), and Paul Carcaterra (sideline)

Game information

First quarter

- (5:29) HOU – Devan Williams 8-yard pass from Zeon Chriss, Jack Martin kick (Drive: 7 plays, 58 yards, 4:12; Houston 7–0)

Second quarter

- (13:38) HOU – Re'Shaun Sanford II 2-yard run, Jack Martin kick (Drive: 8 plays, 62 yards, 4:27; Houston 14–0)
- (4:55) HOU – Jack Martin 34-yard field goal (Drive: 7 plays, 36 yards, 3:34; Houston 17–0)
- (2:18) TCU – Savion Williams 21-yard pass from Josh Hoover, Kyle Lemmermann PAT failed (Drive: 7 plays, 77 yards, 2:31; Houston 17–6)
- (1:48) HOU – Zeon Chriss 71-yard run, Jack Martin kick (Drive: 2 plays, 75 yards, 0:30; Houston 24–6)

Third quarter

- (5:27) TCU – Jeremy Payne 2-yard run, two-point conversion failed (Drive: 9 plays, 64 yards, 4:11; Houston 24–12)

Fourth quarter

- (13:35) HOU – Jack Martin 28-yard field goal (Drive: 8 plays, 25 yards, 5:00; Houston 27–12)
- (9:25) TCU – Jack Bech 29-yard pass from Josh Hoover, Kyle Lemmermann kick (Drive: 10 plays, 71 yards, 4:04; Houston 27–19)
- (1:58) HOU – Jack Martin 27-yard field goal (Drive: 14 plays, 66 yards, 7:27; Houston 30–19)

| Statistics | HOU | TCU |
|---|---|---|
| First downs | 19 | 20 |
| Total yards | 361 | 299 |
| Rushing yards | 207 | 66 |
| Passing yards | 154 | 233 |
| Passing: Comp–Att–Int | 17–20–0 | 23–37–2 |
| Time of possession | 36:53 | 23:07 |

| Team | Category | Player | Statistics |
|---|---|---|---|
| Houston | Passing | Zeon Chriss | 15/18, 141 yards, TD |
| Houston | Rushing | Zeon Chriss | 11 carries, 97 yards, TD |
| Houston | Receiving | Maliq Carr | 2 receptions, 39 yards |
| TCU | Passing | Josh Hoover | 23/37, 233 yards, 2 TD, 2 INT |
| TCU | Rushing | Cam Cook | 14 carries, 77 yards |
| TCU | Receiving | JP Richardson | 9 receptions, 98 yards |

=== at Kansas ===
Houston Cougars (2–4) at Kansas Jayhawks (1–5) – Game summary

| Quarter | 1 | 2 | 3 | 4 | Total |
|---|---|---|---|---|---|
| Cougars | 0 | 14 | 0 | 0 | 14 |
| Jayhawks | 14 | 14 | 0 | 14 | 42 |

at Arrowhead Stadium • Kansas City, MO

- Date: October 19, 2024
- Game time: 2:30 p.m.
- Game weather: Sunny • Temperature: 75 °F (24 °C) • Wind: SW 9 miles per hour (14 km/h)
- Game attendance: 38,619
- Referee: Tutashinda Salaam
- TV announcers (ESPN+): Mark Neely (play-by-play), Todd Doxzon (analyst), and Kelly Crull (sideline)

Game information

First quarter

- (5:56) KAN – Jared Casey 2-yard pass from Jalon Daniels, Tabor Allen kick (Drive: 15 plays, 71 yards, 8:59; Kansas 7–0)
- (2:37) KAN – Quentin Skinner 48-yard pass from Jalon Daniels, Tabor Allen kick (Drive: 1 play, 48 yards, 0:09; Kansas 14–0)

Second quarter

- (10:59) KAN – Devin Neal 2-yard run, Tabor Allen kick (Drive: 6 plays, 84 yards, 3:19; Kansas 21–0)
- (6:18) HOU – Stacy Sneed 23-yard pass from Donovan Smith, Jack Martin kick (Drive: 9 plays, 66 yards, 4:34; Kansas 21–7)
- (3:33) KAN – Jared Casey 3-yard pass from Jalon Daniels, Tabor Allen kick (Drive: 7 plays, 75 yards, 2:45; Kansas 28–7)
- (1:35) HOU – Mekhi Mews 52-yard pass from Donovan Smith, Jack Martin kick (Drive: 5 plays, 75 yards, 1:58; Kansas 28–14)

Third quarter

No scoring plays

Fourth quarter

- (14:21) KAN – Jalon Daniels 8-yard run, Tabor Allen kick (Drive: 8 plays, 87 yards, 4:56; Kansas 35–14)
- (6:50) KAN – Devin Neal 5-yard run, Tabor Allen kick (Drive: 3 plays, 70 yards, 1:36; Kansas 42–14)

| Statistics | HOU | KU |
|---|---|---|
| First downs | 20 | 21 |
| Total yards | 335 | 467 |
| Rushing yards | 98 | 220 |
| Passing yards | 237 | 247 |
| Passing: Comp–Att–Int | 21–33–4 | 16–21–0 |
| Time of possession | 31:41 | 28:19 |

| Team | Category | Player | Statistics |
|---|---|---|---|
| Houston | Passing | Donovan Smith | 15/24, 173 yards, 2 TD, 3 INT |
| Houston | Rushing | Donovan Smith | 14 carries, 45 yards |
| Houston | Receiving | Mekhi Mews | 6 receptions, 99 yards, TD |
| Kansas | Passing | Jalon Daniels | 16/21, 247 yards, 3 TD |
| Kansas | Rushing | Devin Neal | 17 carries, 108 yards, 2 TD |
| Kansas | Receiving | Lawrence Arnold | 4 receptions, 80 yards |

=== vs Utah ===
Utah Utes (4–3) vs Houston Cougars (2–5) – Game summary

| Quarter | 1 | 2 | 3 | 4 | Total |
|---|---|---|---|---|---|
| Utes | 7 | 0 | 7 | 0 | 14 |
| Cougars | 0 | 7 | 0 | 10 | 17 |

at TDECU Stadium • Houston, TX

- Date: October 26, 2024
- Game time: 6:00 p.m.
- Game weather: Clear • Temperature: 85 °F (29 °C) • Wind: SE 9 miles per hour (14 km/h)
- Game attendance: 28,251
- Referee: Luke Richmond
- TV announcers (ESPN+): Richard Cross (play-by-play), Barrett Brooks (analyst), and Tori Petry (sideline)

Game information

First quarter

- (12:28) UTAH – Brant Kuithe 71-yard pass from Isaac Wilson, Cole Becker kick (Drive: 2 plays, 72 yards, 0:47; Utah 7–0)

Second quarter

- (11:54) HOU – Stephon Johnson 21-yard pass from Zeon Chriss, Jack Martin kick (Drive: 3 plays, 23 yards, 1:34; Tied 7–7)

Third quarter

- (5:01) UTAH – Micah Bernard 14-yard run, Cole Becker kick (Drive: 3 plays, 22 yards, 0:56; Utah 14–7)

Fourth quarter

- (8:29) HOU – Joseph Manjack IV 28-yard pass from Zeon Chriss, Jack Martin kick (Drive: 10 plays, 85 yards, 5:43; Tied 14–14)
- (0:00) HOU – Jack Martin 43-yard field goal (Drive: 9 plays, 29 yards, 1:55; Houston 17–14)

| Statistics | UTAH | HOU |
|---|---|---|
| First downs | 12 | 16 |
| Total yards | 306 | 289 |
| Rushing yards | 90 | 228 |
| Passing yards | 216 | 61 |
| Passing: Comp–Att–Int | 20–37–1 | 6–13–1 |
| Time of possession | 28:58 | 31:02 |

| Team | Category | Player | Statistics |
|---|---|---|---|
| Utah | Passing | Isaac Wilson | 13/22, 171 yards, TD |
| Utah | Rushing | Micah Bernard | 14 carries, 51 yards, TD |
| Utah | Receiving | Brant Kuithe | 5 receptions, 113 yards, TD |
| Houston | Passing | Zeon Chriss | 6/13, 61 yards, 2 TD, INT |
| Houston | Rushing | J'Marion Burnette | 8 carries, 81 yards |
| Houston | Receiving | Joseph Manjack IV | 1 reception, 28 yards, TD |

=== vs No. 17 Kansas State ===
No. 17 Kansas State Wildcats (7–1) vs Houston Cougars (3–5) – Game summary

| Quarter | 1 | 2 | 3 | 4 | Total |
|---|---|---|---|---|---|
| No. 17 Wildcats | 3 | 13 | 3 | 0 | 19 |
| Cougars | 0 | 10 | 0 | 14 | 24 |

at TDECU Stadium • Houston, TX

- Date: November 2, 2024
- Game time: 2:30 p.m.
- Game weather: Rain • Temperature: 79 °F (26 °C) • Wind: NW 10 miles per hour (16 km/h)
- Game attendance: 23,085
- Referee: Stephen Baron
- TV announcers (FOX): Jason Benetti (play-by-play), Brock Huard (analyst), and Allison Williams (sideline)

Game information

First quarter

- (8:12) KSU – Chris Tennant 23-yard field goal (Drive: 15 plays, 70 yards, 6:48; Kansas State 3–0)

Second quarter

- (14:56) HOU – Donovan Smith 1-yard run, Jack Martin kick (Drive: 5 plays, 53 yards, 2:16; Houston 7–3)
- (8:37) HOU – Jack Martin 22-yard field goal (Drive: 9 plays, 55 yards, 5:16; Houston 10–3)
- (1:48) KSU – DJ Giddens 2-yard run, Chris Tennant PAT failed (Drive: 14 plays, 71 yards, 6:40; Houston 10–9)
- (0:09) KSU – Keagan Johnson 7-yard pass from Avery Johnson, Chris Tennant kick (Drive: 5 plays, 48 yards, 0:29; Kansas State 16–10)

Third quarter

- (0:00) KSU – Chris Tennant 47-yard field goal (Drive: 5 plays, 55 yards, 1:50; Kansas State 19–10)

Fourth quarter

- (10:58) HOU – Maliq Carr 1-yard pass from Zeon Chriss, Jack Martin kick (Drive: 3 plays, 9 yards, 1:20; Kansas State 19–17)
- (2:31) HOU – Zeon Chriss 41-yard run, Jack Martin kick (Drive: 1 play, 56 yards, 0:12; Houston 24–19)

| Statistics | KSU | HOU |
|---|---|---|
| First downs | 21 | 10 |
| Total yards | 327 | 232 |
| Rushing yards | 89 | 121 |
| Passing yards | 238 | 111 |
| Passing: Comp–Att–Int | 23–41–2 | 12–12–0 |
| Time of possession | 31:01 | 28:59 |

| Team | Category | Player | Statistics |
|---|---|---|---|
| Kansas State | Passing | Avery Johnson | 23/39, 238 yards, TD, 2 INT |
| Kansas State | Rushing | DJ Giddens | 17 carries, 50 yards, TD |
| Kansas State | Receiving | Jayce Brown | 3 receptions, 86 yards |
| Houston | Passing | Zeon Chriss | 11/11, 103 yards, TD |
| Houston | Rushing | Zeon Chriss | 22 carries, 75 yards, TD |
| Houston | Receiving | Joseph Manjack IV | 1 reception, 44 yards |

=== at Arizona ===
Houston Cougars (4–5) at Arizona Wildcats (3–6) – Game summary

| Quarter | 1 | 2 | 3 | 4 | Total |
|---|---|---|---|---|---|
| Cougars | 0 | 3 | 0 | 0 | 3 |
| Wildcats | 7 | 3 | 17 | 0 | 27 |

at Arizona Stadium • Tucson, AZ

- Date: November 15, 2024
- Game time: 9:15 p.m.
- Game weather: Clear, 58 °F (14 °C)
- Game attendance: 38,538
- Referee: Mike McCabe
- TV announcers (FS1): Trent Rush (play-by-play) and Petros Papadakis (analyst)

Game information

First quarter

- (8:28) ARIZ – Tetairoa McMillan 33-yard pass from Noah Fifita, Tyler Loop kick (Drive: 7 plays, 60 yards, 2:51; Arizona 7–0)

Second quarter

- (0:42) HOU – Jack Martin 49-yard field goal (Drive: 7 plays, 49 yards, 3:06; Arizona 7–3)
- (0:00) ARIZ – Tyler Loop 62-yard field goal (Drive: 6 plays, 31 yards, 0:42; Arizona 10–3)

Third quarter

- (10:01) ARIZ – Quali Conley 13-yard pass from Noah Fifita, Tyler Loop kick (Drive: 10 plays, 70 yards, 3:41; Arizona 17–3)
- (6:15) ARIZ – Tyler Loop 51-yard field goal (Drive: 5 plays, 16 yards, 1:47; Arizona 20–3)
- (4:27) ARIZ – Quali Conley 50-yard run, Tyler Loop kick (Drive: 1 play, 50 yards, 0:10; Arizona 27–3)

Fourth quarter

No scoring plays

| Statistics | HOU | ARIZ |
|---|---|---|
| First downs | 14 | 20 |
| Total yards | 326 | 341 |
| Rushing yards | 135 | 117 |
| Passing yards | 191 | 224 |
| Passing: Comp–Att–Int | 16–28–1 | 20–35–1 |
| Time of possession | 28:56 | 31:04 |

| Team | Category | Player | Statistics |
|---|---|---|---|
| Houston | Passing | Zeon Chriss | 16/27, 191 yards, INT |
| Houston | Rushing | Re'Shaun Sanford II | 10 carries, 76 yards |
| Houston | Receiving | Stephon Johnson | 4 receptions, 70 yards |
| Arizona | Passing | Noah Fifita | 20/35, 224 yards, 2 TD, INT |
| Arizona | Rushing | Quali Conley | 11 carries, 107 yards, TD |
| Arizona | Receiving | Tetairoa McMillan | 6 receptions, 70 yards, TD |

=== vs Baylor (rivalry) ===
Baylor Bears (6–4) vs Houston Cougars (4–6) – Game summary

| Quarter | 1 | 2 | 3 | 4 | Total |
|---|---|---|---|---|---|
| Bears | 7 | 10 | 0 | 3 | 20 |
| Cougars | 7 | 0 | 0 | 3 | 10 |

at TDECU Stadium • Houston, TX

- Date: November 23, 2024
- Game time: 6:00 p.m.
- Game weather: Clear • Temperature: 68 °F (20 °C) • Wind: SE 12 miles per hour (19 km/h)
- Game attendance: 34,166
- Referee: Henry Johns
- TV announcers (FS1): Connor Onion (play-by-play) and Spencer Tillman (analyst)

Game information

First quarter

- (6:11) BAY – Sawyer Robertson 5-yard pass from Sawyer Robertson, Isaiah Hankins kick (Drive: 14 plays, 80 yards, 5:20; Baylor 7–0)
- (0:32) HOU – Jeremiah Wilson 41-yard interception, Jack Martin kick (Tied 7–7)

Second quarter

- (9:50) BAY – Ashtyn Hawkins 23-yard pass from Sawyer Robertson, Isaiah Hankins kick (Drive: 11 plays, 74 yards, 5:35; Baylor 14–7)
- (0:00) BAY – Isaiah Hankins 45-yard field goal (Drive: 11 plays, 59 yards, 6:03; Baylor 17–7)

Third quarter

No scoring plays

Fourth quarter

- (14:52) HOU – Jack Martin 24-yard field goal (Drive: 13 plays, 74 yards, 6:13; Baylor 17–10)
- (4:24) BAY – Isaiah Hankins 50-yard field goal (Drive: 4 plays, 6 yards, 1:58; Baylor 20–10)

| Statistics | BAY | HOU |
|---|---|---|
| First downs | 20 | 14 |
| Total yards | 325 | 239 |
| Rushing yards | 121 | 92 |
| Passing yards | 204 | 147 |
| Passing: Comp–Att–Int | 15–23–2 | 14–25–3 |
| Time of possession | 34:52 | 25:08 |

| Team | Category | Player | Statistics |
|---|---|---|---|
| Baylor | Passing | Sawyer Robertson | 15/23, 204 yards, 2 TD, 3 INT |
| Baylor | Rushing | Bryson Washington | 28 carries, 113 yards |
| Baylor | Receiving | Michael Trigg | 4 receptions, 96 yards, TD |
| Houston | Passing | Zeon Chriss | 13/24, 126 yards, 3 INT |
| Houston | Rushing | Re'Shaun Sanford II | 8 carries, 37 yards |
| Houston | Receiving | Stephon Johnson | 3 receptions, 54 yards |

=== at No. 19 BYU ===
Houston Cougars (4–7) at No. 19 BYU Cougars (9–2) – Game summary

| Quarter | 1 | 2 | 3 | 4 | Total |
|---|---|---|---|---|---|
| Houston | 0 | 0 | 0 | 0 | 0 |
| No. 19 BYU | 0 | 0 | 0 | 0 | 0 |

at LaVell Edwards Stadium • Provo, UT

- Date: November 30, 2024
- Game time: 9:15 p.m.
- Game weather: 0 °F (−18 °C)
- TV announcers (ESPN): Dave Flemming (play-by-play, Brock Osweiler (analyst), and Stormy Buonantony (sideline reporter)

Game information

First quarter
Second quarter
Third quarter
Fourth quarter

| Statistics | HOU | BYU |
|---|---|---|
| First downs | | |
| Total yards | | |
| Rushing yards | | |
| Passing yards | | |
| Passing: Comp–Att–Int | | |
| Time of possession | | |

| Team | Category | Player | Statistics |
|---|---|---|---|
| Houston | Passing | | |
| Houston | Rushing | | |
| Houston | Receiving | | |
| BYU | Passing | | |
| BYU | Rushing | | |
| BYU | Receiving | | |
