= Mekhi Mews =

American gridiron football player (born 2002)

- with the Montreal Alouettes in 2026

No. 83 – Montreal Alouettes
- Position: Wide receiver
- Roster status: Practice roster
- CFL status: American

Personal information
- Born: October 2, 2002 (age 24); Grayson, Georgia, U.S.
- Listed height: 5 ft 7 in (1.70 m)
- Listed weight: 189 lb (86 kg)

Career information
- High school: Central Gwinnett (Lawrenceville, Georgia)
- College: Georgia (2021–2023); Houston (2024–2025)
- NFL draft: 2026: undrafted

Career history
- Montreal Alouettes (2026–present)

Awards and highlights
- 2× CFP National Champion (2021, 2022)
- Stats at CFL.ca

Mekhi Patrick Mews (born October 2, 2002) is an American professional football wide receiver for the Montreal Alouettes of the Canadian Football League (CFL). He played college football for the Georgia Bulldogs and Houston Cougars.

== Early life ==
Mews attended Central Gwinnett High School in Lawrenceville, Georgia. In his senior year, Mews recorded 1,522 yards and eleven touchdowns before deciding to walk-on to play college football at the University of Georgia over scholarship offers from Tennessee Tech and Savannah State.

== College career ==
=== Georgia ===
Mews played sparingly during his first two seasons at Georgia, redshirting in 2021. During the 2023 season opener against UT Martin, he tallied three receptions for 75 yards and a touchdown, a 54-yard pass from Carson Beck. The following week against Ball State, Mews returned a punt 69 yards for a touchdown, contributing to a 45–3 victory. The touchdown by Mews was the first punt-return touchdown for Georgia in 14 years. Mews finished the season with 13 receptions for 155 yards and touchdown. On December 7, 2023, Mews entered the transfer portal.

=== Houston ===
On January 10, 2024, Mews announced that he would be transferring to the University of Houston to play for the Houston Cougars. He had 29 receptions for 253 yards and one touchdown in the 2024 season.

=== Statistics ===
| Year | Team | Games | Receiving | | | | Punt Returning | | | | Kick Returning | | | |
| Year | Team | GP | Rec | Yards | Avg | TD | Ret | Yards | Avg | TD | Ret | Yards | Avg | TD |
|---|---|---|---|---|---|---|---|---|---|---|---|---|---|---|
| 2021 | Georgia | 1 | – | – | – | – | 1 | 4 | 4.0 | 0 | 1 | 12 | 12.0 | 0 |
| 2022 | Georgia | 4 | 2 | 9 | 4.5 | 0 | 1 | 21 | 21.0 | 0 | – | – | – | – |
| 2023 | Georgia | 13 | 13 | 155 | 11.9 | 1 | 20 | 205 | 10.3 | 1 | 15 | 402 | 26.8 | 0 |
| 2024 | Houston | 7 | 20 | 218 | 10.9 | 1 | 10 | 84 | 8.4 | 1 | 1 | 34 | 34.0 | 0 |
| Career | | 25 | 35 | 382 | 10.9 | 2 | 32 | 314 | 9.8 | 2 | 17 | 448 | 26.4 | 0 |

== Professional career ==
Pre-draft measurables
| Height | Weight | Arm length | Hand span | Wingspan | 40-yard dash | 10-yard split | 20-yard split | 20-yard shuttle | Three-cone drill | Vertical jump | Broad jump | Bench press |
|---|---|---|---|---|---|---|---|---|---|---|---|---|
| 5 ft 6 3/4 in (1.70 m) | 179 lb (81 kg) | 27 3/8 in (0.70 m) | 8 5/8 in (0.22 m) | 5 ft 5 1/2 in (1.66 m) | 4.63 s | 1.62 s | 2.69 s | 4.32 s | 7.14 s | 35.0 in (0.89 m) | 8 ft 11 in (2.72 m) | 17 reps |
All values from Pro Day

On July 24, 2026, Mews signed with the Montreal Alouettes of the Canadian Football League.
