= Zeon Chriss-Gremillion =

American football player

No. 9 – Tulane Green Wave
- Position: Quarterback
- Class: Redshirt Senior

Personal information
- Listed height: 6 ft 3 in (1.91 m)
- Listed weight: 216 lb (98 kg)

Career information
- High school: Madison Prep Academy (Baton Rouge, Louisiana)
- College: Louisiana (2022–2023); Houston (2024–2025); Tulane (2026–present)
- Stats at ESPN

Zeon Chriss-Gremillion is an American college football quarterback for the Tulane Green Wave. He previously played for the Louisiana Ragin' Cajuns and Houston Cougars.

== Early life ==
Chriss grew up in Baton Rouge, Louisiana, and attended Madison Prep Academy. In his high school career, Chriss completed 183 of 339 pass attempts for 2,954 yards, 45 touchdowns and six interceptions. Chriss also rushed for 629 yards and eight touchdowns, while also hauling in a reception for 12 yards. Chriss was rated as a three-star recruit and committed to play college football at the University of Louisiana at Lafayette over offers from Memphis, San Diego State, Appalachian State, South Alabama, Army, Air Force, Miami (OH) and William & Mary.

== College career ==
=== Louisiana ===
As a freshman in 2022, Chriss played in four games and completed nine of 15 passing attempts for a touchdown and 33 rushing yards on six attempts. He made his collegiate debut against Arkansas State. During a game against Texas State, Chriss completed five of six passing attempts for 84 yards and a touchdown to win and help the Ragin' Cajuns become bowl eligible. In the 2022 Independence Bowl, he completed four of six passing attempts with 26 rushing yards on four attempts.

During the 2023 season, Chriss played in eight games, starting six, and completed 102 of 153 passing attempts for 1,222 yards and 11 touchdowns with five interceptions. He made his first start against Buffalo where he completed 22 of 29 passing attempts for 249 yards, a touchdown and two interceptions. While playing against Arkansas State during the fourth quarter, Chriss suffered a broken fibula which had him sit out for the rest of the season.

On December 20, 2023, Chriss announced that he would be entering the NCAA transfer portal.

=== Houston ===
On January 3, 2024, Chriss announced that he would be transferring to Houston.

On December 31, 2025, Chriss announced that he would enter the transfer portal for the second time.

=== Tulane ===
On January 7, 2026, Chriss announced that he would transfer to Tulane.

=== Statistics ===
Season	Team	Games			Passing								Rushing			
Season	Team	GP	GS	Record	Cmp	Att	Pct	Yds	Avg	TD	Int	Rtg	Att	Yds	Avg	TD
2022	Louisiana	4	0	—	9	15	60.0	109	7.3	1	1	129.7	6	33	5.5	0
2023	Louisiana	8	6	3−3	102	153	66.7	1,222	8.0	11	5	150.9	73	492	6.7	6
2024	Houston	11	7	3–4	83	130	63.8	824	6.3	4	8	114.9	114	388	3.4	4
2025	Houston	5	0	—	10	21	47.6	108	4.8	1	1	97.0	12	79	6.6	0
Career		28	13	6−7	204	319	63.9	2,263	7.1	17	15	131.7	205	992	4.8	10
