= 2023 Louisiana Ragin' Cajuns football team =

American college football season

2023 Louisiana Ragin' Cajuns football

New Orleans Bowl, L 31–34 ^{OT} vs. Jacksonville State
- Conference: Sun Belt Conference
- West Division
- Record: 6–7 (3–5 Sun Belt)
- Head coach: Michael Desormeaux (2nd season)
- Associate head coach: Jorge Munoz (2nd season)
- Offensive coordinator: Tim Leger (3rd season)
- Offensive scheme: Spread
- Defensive coordinator: LaMar Morgan (2nd season)
- Base defense: 3–4
- Home stadium: Cajun Field

2023 Sun Belt Conference football standings
	Conf.			Overall
Team	W		L	W		L
East Division
James Madison* x	7	–	1	11	–	2
Appalachian State y	6	–	2	9	–	5
Coastal Carolina	5	–	3	8	–	5
Old Dominion	5	–	3	6	–	7
Georgia State	3	–	5	7	–	6
Marshall	3	–	5	6	–	7
Georgia Southern	3	–	5	6	–	7
West Division
Troy xy$	7	–	1	11	–	3
Texas State	4	–	4	8	–	5
Arkansas State	4	–	4	6	–	7
South Alabama	4	–	4	7	–	6
Louisiana	3	–	5	6	–	7
Southern Miss	2	–	6	3	–	9
Louisiana–Monroe	0	–	8	2	–	10
Championship: Troy 49, Appalachian State 23
$ – Conference champion; x – Division champion/co-champions; y – Championship game participant; * – Ineligible for postseason play due to FCS-to-FBS transition rules

The 2023 Louisiana Ragin' Cajuns football team represented the University of Louisiana at Lafayette in the 2023 NCAA Division I FBS football season. The Ragin' Cajuns played their home games at Cajun Field in Lafayette, Louisiana, and competed in the West Division of the Sun Belt Conference. They were led by second-year head coach Michael Desormeaux.

== Preseason ==
=== Recruiting class ===
College recruiting
Name	Hometown	School	Height	Weight	40^{‡}	Commit date
Antoine Baylis; DL	Mansfield, Texas	Lake Ridge HS; Southwest Baptist	6 ft 2 in (1.88 m)	285 lb (129 kg)	–	
Antoine Baylis; DL	Recruit ratings: No ratings found					
John Bragg; OL	Austin, Texas	Lyndon B. Johnson HS	6 ft 4 in (1.93 m)	265 lb (120 kg)	–	Dec 14, 2022
John Bragg; OL	Recruit ratings: Rivals: 247Sports:					
Harvey Broussard; WR	St. Martinville, Louisiana	St. Martinville HS	6 ft 2 in (1.88 m)	185 lb (84 kg)	–	Dec 21, 2022
Harvey Broussard; WR	Recruit ratings: Rivals: 247Sports: ESPN:					
Matthew Broussard; OL	Thibodaux, Louisiana	E. D. White HS	6 ft 3 in (1.91 m)	285 lb (129 kg)	–	Jun 17, 2022
Matthew Broussard; OL	Recruit ratings: Rivals: 247Sports:					
Glenn Brown; DB	LaPlace, Louisiana	St. James HS; Southern	5 ft 11 in (1.80 m)	190 lb (86 kg)	–	
Glenn Brown; DB	Recruit ratings: Rivals:					
Xzavier Brown; OL	Ashdown, Arkansas	Ashdown HS	6 ft 6 in (1.98 m)	305 lb (138 kg)	–	Dec 21, 2022
Xzavier Brown; OL	Recruit ratings: 247Sports:					
Mason Clinton; DL	Petal, Mississippi	Petal MS	6 ft 5 in (1.96 m)	270 lb (120 kg)	–	Dec 21, 2022
Mason Clinton; DL	Recruit ratings: Rivals:					
Zavion Coleman; DL	Picayune, Mississippi	Picayune HS	6 ft 2 in (1.88 m)	270 lb (120 kg)	–	Dec 21, 2022
Zavion Coleman; DL	Recruit ratings: Rivals:					
Elijah Davis; RB	Reserve, Louisiana	Riverside Academy	5 ft 10 in (1.78 m)	210 lb (95 kg)	–	Jun 12, 2022
Elijah Davis; RB	Recruit ratings: 247Sports: ESPN:					
Chase Edwards; DL	Houston, Texas	Cypress Falls HS	6 ft 7 in (2.01 m)	250 lb (110 kg)	–	Dec 21, 2022
Chase Edwards; DL	Recruit ratings: Rivals: 247Sports:					
Trey Fite; LB	Tatum, Texas	Tatum HS; SMU	6 ft 4 in (1.93 m)	225 lb (102 kg)	–	Dec 21, 2022
Trey Fite; LB	Recruit ratings: Rivals:					
Cooper Fordham; OL	Jacksonville, Florida	The Bolles School	6 ft 2 in (1.88 m)	300 lb (140 kg)	–	Aug 23, 2022
Cooper Fordham; OL	Recruit ratings: Rivals: 247Sports: ESPN:					
Jay'veon Haynes; WR	Baton Rouge, Louisiana	Woodlawn HS	5 ft 9 in (1.75 m)	180 lb (82 kg)	–	Mar 29, 2022
Jay'veon Haynes; WR	Recruit ratings: Rivals: 247Sports: ESPN:					
Kody Jackson; S	Shreveport, Louisiana	Evangel Christian Academy	6 ft 1 in (1.85 m)	185 lb (84 kg)	–	Dec 21, 2022
Kody Jackson; S	Recruit ratings: Rivals: 247Sports:					
AJ Jayroe; WR	Frisco, Texas	Reedy HS	6 ft 4 in (1.93 m)	190 lb (86 kg)	–	Dec 19, 2022
AJ Jayroe; WR	Recruit ratings: Rivals: 247Sports: ESPN:					
Caden Jensen; TE	Flower Mound, Texas	Flower Mound HS	6 ft 6 in (1.98 m)	250 lb (110 kg)	–	Aug 1, 2022
Caden Jensen; TE	Recruit ratings: Rivals:					
Micah Johnson; LB	Baton Rouge, Louisiana	Parkview Baptist HS	6 ft 1 in (1.85 m)	225 lb (102 kg)	–	Dec 21, 2022
Micah Johnson; LB	Recruit ratings: Rivals: 247Sports:					
Jaylen Lawrence; OLB	Arcadia, Louisiana	Arcadia HS	6 ft 1 in (1.85 m)	205 lb (93 kg)	–	Aug 2, 2022
Jaylen Lawrence; OLB	Recruit ratings: No ratings found					
Kadarius Miller; DE	Magnolia, Mississippi	South Pike HS; Copiah–Lincoln CC	6 ft 2 in (1.88 m)	300 lb (140 kg)	–	Dec 18, 2022
Kadarius Miller; DE	Recruit ratings: Rivals: 247Sports:					
Jeremiah Moses; CB	Shreveport, Louisiana	Belle Chasse HS	6 ft 0 in (1.83 m)	180 lb (82 kg)	–	Aug 1, 2022
Jeremiah Moses; CB	Recruit ratings: Rivals: 247Sports:					
Shadwel Nkuba II; CB	Lewisville, Texas	Lewisville HS; Tyler JC	6 ft 2 in (1.88 m)	180 lb (82 kg)	–	May 25, 2023
Shadwel Nkuba II; CB	Recruit ratings: 247Sports:					
Daylon Sibley; LB	Lake Charles, Louisiana	Lake Charles College Prep HS	6 ft 0 in (1.83 m)	210 lb (95 kg)	–	Dec 21, 2022
Daylon Sibley; LB	Recruit ratings: Rivals:					
Tavion Smith; WR	Hattiesburg, Mississippi	Oak Grove HS; Jones College	6 ft 3 in (1.91 m)	205 lb (93 kg)	–	Nov 14, 2022
Tavion Smith; WR	Recruit ratings: Rivals: 247Sports: ESPN:					
Emiliano Soldevilla; LB	Houston, Texas	Cypress Ridge HS	6 ft 2 in (1.88 m)	220 lb (100 kg)	–	Feb 1, 2023
Emiliano Soldevilla; LB	Recruit ratings: Rivals:					
Ty Stamey; TE	Spring, Texas	Klein Collins HS	6 ft 5 in (1.96 m)	225 lb (102 kg)	–	Aug 1, 2022
Ty Stamey; TE	Recruit ratings: Rivals: 247Sports:					
KeDarius Wade; WR	Jackson, Mississippi	Callaway HS	6 ft 4 in (1.93 m)	195 lb (88 kg)	–	Dec 21, 2022
KeDarius Wade; WR	Recruit ratings: Rivals:					
Lance Williams; DL	New Orleans, Louisiana	Holy Cross School	6 ft 2 in (1.88 m)	250 lb (110 kg)	–	Aug 5, 2022
Lance Williams; DL	Recruit ratings: Rivals: 247Sports:					
D'Wayne' Winfield; QB	Lutcher, Louisiana	Lutcher HS	6 ft 1 in (1.85 m)	220 lb (100 kg)	–	Feb 1, 2023
D'Wayne' Winfield; QB	Recruit ratings: Rivals:					

=== Award watch lists ===
Listed in the order that they were released

==== Preseason ====
Award	Player	Position	Year	Reference
Warrick Dunn Award	D'Wayne' Winfield	QB	FR	
Outland Trophy	AJ Gillie	OL	RS-JR	
Lou Groza Award	Kenneth Almendares	K	RS-JR	
Wuerffel Trophy	Ben Wooldridge	QB	RS-SR	
Mackey Award	Neal Johnson	TE	SR	
Ray Guy Award	Thomas Leo	K/P	RS-SR	
Doak Walker Award	Dre'lyn Washington	RB	RS-SO	
Earl Campbell Tyler Rose Award	Neal Johnson	TE	SR	

=== Media poll ===
In the Sun Belt preseason coaches' poll, the Ragin' Cajuns were picked to finish in third place in the West division.

Tight end Neal Johnson was named to the preseason All-Sun Belt first team. Offensive lineman AJ Gillie was named to the second team.

== Personnel ==
2023 Louisiana Ragin' Cajuns football team roster
Players
Coaches
Offense

Pos.	#	Name	Class
RB	0	Jacob Kibodi	Sr
QB	2	Zeon Chriss	Fr
WR	3	Harvey Broussard	Fr
WR	4	Jacob Bernard	Jr
WR	6	Kaleb Carter	Sr
RB	7	Elijah Davis	Fr
RB	8	Terrence Williams	Jr
TE	9	Neal Johnson	Sr
QB	10	Ben Wooldridge	Sr
WR	11	Dalen Cambre	Jr
WR	12	Lance LeGendre	Jr
WR	13	Charles Robertson	Fr
WR	15	Robert Williams	So
QB	16	Chantz Ceaser	Fr
QB	17	D'Wayné Winfield Williams	Fr
QB	18	Chandler Fields	Jr
WR	19	Dale Martin	So
RB	20	Dre'Lyn Washington	So
RB	21	Zylan Perry	Fr
RB	22	Chaz Ward	Jr
TE	24	Pearse Migl	Sr
TE	26	Caleb Bonine	So
RB	27	Kendrell Williams	So
WR	28	KeDarius Wade	Fr
WR	29	Peter LeBlanc	Sr
WR	30	Trayv'on Culbert	So
RB	31	Damondrick Blackburn	Fr
WR	33	Landon Baptiste	Fr
WR	34	Kanyon St. Julien	Jr
RB	41	Tylon Citizen	Fr
TE	43	Ty Stamey	Fr
OL	50	Nate Thomas	Jr
OL	51	James Ohonba	Sr
OL	52	Cooper Fordham	Fr
OL	53	AJ Gillie	Jr
OL	55	Landon Burton	Jr
OL	59	Andrew Martinez	Fr
OL	61	Zachary Thomas	Fr
OL	62	Ethan Clark	Fr
OL	63	Ryan Ebrahim	So
OL	64	Bryant Williams	Fr
OL	65	Xzavier Brown	Fr
OL	66	Trent Murphy	Fr
OL	67	John Bragg	Fr
OL	68	Nick Doré	Fr
OL	70	Jax Harrington	So
OL	71	George Jackson	So
OL	72	Kole Hayes	Fr
OL	73	Lucious Guillory	Fr
OL	74	Peyton Polk	Fr
OL	75	Kaden Moreau	Fr
OL	76	Matthew Broussard	Fr
OL	77	King McGowen	Jr
OL	78	Quinton Williams	So
OL	79	Mackey Maillho	So
WR	80	Tavion Smith	Jr
WR	81	Jaydon Johnson	Fr
TE	82	Rhett Guidry	So
TE	84	Jathan Caldwell	So
WR	85	AJ Jayroe	Fr
TE	86	Terrance Carter	Fr
TE	87	Tyler Hatcher	So
TE	88	Caden Jensen	Fr

Defense

Pos.	#	Name	Class
DL	0	Jordan Lawson	So
LB	2	Jasper Williams	Sr
S	3	Tyrone Lewis Jr.	Jr
S	4	Tyree Skipper	So
LB	6	Kendre' Gant	Jr
CB	7	Courtline Flowers	So
LB	8	K. C. Ossai	Jr
DL	9	Mason Narcisse	Jr
DL	10	Nijel McGriff	Jr
CB	11	Caleb Anderson	So
CB	13	Amir McDaniel	Jr
OLB	15	Ja'Marian Peterson	So
LB	16	Kailep Edwards	So
LB	17	Cameron George	So
S	18	Micaiah Bivines	Jr
LB	19	Cameron Whitfield	So
CB	20	Jalen Clark	So
CB	21	Keyon Martin	Jr
S	22	Patrick Mensah	Sr
CB	23	Jeremiah Moses	Fr
CB	24	Lorenzell Dubose	Fr
CB	25	Glenn Brown	Sr
CB	26	Justin Agu	So
CB	27	Key'Savalyn Barnes	So
S	28	Kody Jackson	Fr
CB	29	Denim Day	Fr
S	30	Cejae Ceasar	So
LB	31	Trey Fite	Fr
LB	33	Tyler Guidry	Sr
CB	34	Calep Jacob	Fr
CB	35	Collin Jacob	Fr
S	36	Maurion Eleam	Fr
LB	37	Micah Johnson	Fr
S	37	Bryant Merriwether	Fr
CB	38	Shadwel Nkuba II	So
DL	41	Chase Edwards	Fr
S	43	Aaron Wright	So
LB	44	Jake St. Andre	So
LB	45	Caleb Kibodi	So
S	46	Larry Reimonenq	So
LB	46	Emiliano Soldevilla	Fr
S	47	Kerry Wilson	Fr
LB	48	Daylon Sibley	Fr
S	49	Travin Moore	Fr
DT	50	Jace Philip	Fr
LB	51	Hayden Darbonne	Fr
DL	52	Demetrus Gladney	Fr
DL	53	Christopher Scott	Fr
DE	54	KJ Riley III	Fr
DL	56	Joshua Robinson	Fr
OLB	80	Lester Jones	Fr
OLB	81	Jaden Allison	Fr
OLB	82	Makai Donaldson	Fr
DL	90	Kadarius Miller	Jr
DL	91	Sonny Hazard	Jr
DL	92	Zavion Coleman	Fr
DL	93	Antoine Baylis	Jr
DL	95	Blake Champagne	So
DL	96	RJ Oliver	So
DL	97	Lance Williams	Fr
DL	98	Mason Clinton	Fr
DL	99	Marcus Wiser	Jr

Special teams

Pos.	#	Name	Class
K	36	Gavin Royer	Fr
LS	39	Carter Milliron	So
K	40	Logan Klotz	So
LS	40	Hunter Sims	So
K	45	Kenneth Almendares	Jr
K	47	Alan Guerrieri	Jr
K/P	84	Thomas Leo	Sr
K	95	Tony Sterner	So
K	98	Brock Froschauer	Fr

Head coach

- Michael Desormeaux (Louisiana)

Coordinators/assistant coaches

- LaMar Morgan (Louisiana)
  Defensive coordinator/S
- Tim Leger (McNeese State)
  Offensive coordinator/recruiting coordinator/WR
- Luke Paschall (Middle Tennessee)
  Special teams coordinator/director of quality control
- Jorge Munoz (Bethany)
  Associate head coach/TE
- Matt Bergeron (Lamar)
  Running backs
- Jeff Burris (Notre Dame)
  Cornerbacks
- Mike Giuliani (SUNY Cortland)
  Outside linebackers
- Jeff Norrid (Arkansas)
  Offensive linemen
- Bryant Ross (Alabama A&M)
  Assistant OL
- Galen Scott (Illinois State)
  Inside linebackers
- Dennis Thomas (South Carolina)
  Defensive linemen

Legend

- (C) Team captain
- (S) Suspended
- (I) Ineligible
- Injured
- Redshirt

Roster
Last update: 28 August 2023

== Schedule ==
The football schedule was announced February 24, 2023.

Date	Time	Opponent	Site	TV	Result	Attendance
September 2	6:30 p.m.	Northwestern State*	Cajun Field; Lafayette, LA	ESPN+	W 38–13	18,186
September 9	5:00 p.m.	at Old Dominion	S.B. Ballard Stadium; Norfolk, VA	ESPN+	L 31–38	18,154
September 16	6:00 p.m.	at UAB*	Protective Stadium; Birmingham, AL	ESPN+	W 41–21	21,673
September 23	6:30 p.m.	Buffalo*	Cajun Field; Lafayette, LA	ESPN+	W 45–38	17,674
September 30	11:00 a.m.	at Minnesota*	Huntington Bank Stadium; Minneapolis, MN	BTN	L 24–35	46,843
October 7	2:30 p.m.	Texas State	Cajun Field; Lafayette, LA	ESPNU	W 34–30	15,053
October 21	7:00 p.m.	Georgia State^{†}	Cajun Field; Lafayette, LA	ESPNU	L 17–20	20,044
October 28	4:00 p.m.	at South Alabama	Hancock Whitney Stadium; Mobile, AL	ESPN+	W 33–20	16,709
November 4	2:00 p.m.	at Arkansas State	Centennial Bank Stadium; Jonesboro, AR	ESPN+	L 17–37	15,881
November 9	6:30 p.m.	Southern Miss	Cajun Field; Lafayette, LA	ESPNU	L 31–34 ^{OT}	15,137
November 18	6:00 p.m.	at Troy	Veterans Memorial Stadium; Troy, AL	NFLN	L 24–31	26,621
November 25	2:00 p.m.	Louisiana–Monroe	Cajun Field; Lafyette, LA (Battle on the Bayou)	ESPN+	W 52–21	13,892
December 16	1:15 p.m.	vs. Jacksonville State*	Caesars Superdome; New Orleans, LA (New Orleans Bowl)	ESPN	L 31–34 ^{OT}	14,485
*Non-conference game; ^{†}Homecoming; Rankings from AP Poll and CFP Rankings released prior to game; All times are in Central time

== Game summaries ==
=== Northwestern State ===
Northwestern State at Louisiana

Team	1	2	3	4	Total
Demons	3	3	0	7	13
• Ragin' Cajuns	7	14	7	10	38

- Date: September 2, 2023
- Location: Cajun Field
  Lafayette, Louisiana
- Game start: 7:52 p.m. CDT
- Elapsed time: 3 hours and 47 minutes
- Game attendance: 18,186
- Game weather: 85 °F (29 °C) • Weather: Sunny • Wind: NW 6 MPH
- Referee: Scott Broadway
- TV announcers (ESPN+): Dan McDonald (play-by-play) and Eric Mouton (analyst)

Scoring summary
1	11:55	LA	Dre'lyn Washington 62-yard rush (Kenneth Almendares kick) (2 plays, 67 yards, 0:53)	LA 7–0
1	04:49	NWST	Brett Money 37-yard field goal (4 plays, -6 yards, 1:47)	LA 7–3
2	11:39	LA	Ben Wooldridge 24-yard rush (Kenneth Almendares kick) (4 plays, 41 yards, 1:19)	LA 14–3
2	09:09	LA	Robert Williams 32-yard pass from Ben Wooldridge (Kenneth Almendares kick) (4 plays, 42 yards, 1:37)	LA 21–3
2	02:17	NWST	Brett Money 41-yard field goal (8 plays, 17 yards, 3:10)	LA 21–6
3	09:28	LA	Peter LeBlanc 50-yard pass from Ben Wooldridge (Kenneth Almendares kick) (4 plays, 77 yards, 1:48)	LA 28–6
4	14:55	LA	Kenneth Almendares 33-yard field goal (7 plays, 48 yards, 3:15)	LA 31–6
4	04:59	LA	Tavion Smith 21-yard pass from Ben Wooldridge (Alan Guerrieri kick) (10 plays, 68 yards, 5:23)	LA 38–6
4	02:01	NWST	Scooter Adams 47-yard pass from Tyler Vander (Brett Money kick) (6 plays, 65 yards, 2:58)	LA 38–13

Statistics	Northwestern State	Louisiana
First downs	8	20
Total yards	187	429
Rushing yards	77	206
Passing yards	110	223
Turnovers	1	2
Time of possession	32:58	27:02

Team	Category	Player	Statistics
Northwestern State	Passing	Tyler Vander Waal	12/28, 110 yards, 1 TD
Northwestern State	Rushing	Scooter Adams	8 carries, 33 yards
Northwestern State	Receiving	Scooter Adams	2 receptions, 48 yards, 1 TD
Louisiana	Passing	Ben Wooldridge	14/32, 223 yards, 3 TDs, 1 INT
Louisiana	Rushing	Dre'lyn Washington	8 carries, 88 yards, 1 TD
Louisiana	Receiving	Peter LeBlanc	2 receptions, 58 yards, 1 TD

=== at Old Dominion ===
Louisiana at Old Dominion

Team	1	2	3	4	Total
Ragin' Cajuns	10	7	0	14	31
• Monarchs	7	10	14	7	38

- Date: September 9, 2023
- Location: S.B. Ballard Stadium
  Norfolk, Virginia
- Game start: 6:55 p.m. CDT
- Elapsed time: 3 hours and 11 minutes
- Game attendance: 18,154
- Game weather: 85 °F (29 °C) • Weather: Cloudy • Wind: N 5 MPH
- Referee: Ted Pitts
- TV announcers (ESPN+): Chip Tarkenton (play-by-play) and Andy Mashaw (analyst)

Scoring summary
1	10:59	LA	Harvey Broussard 3-yard pass from Ben Wooldridge (Kenneth Almendares kick) (9 plays, 75 yards, 3:56)	LA 7–0
1	10:26	ODU	Ahmarian Granger 30-yard pass from Grant Wilson (Ethan Sanchez kick) (2 plays, 55 yards, 0:26)	TIE 7–7
1	03:32	LA	Kenneth Almendares 28-yard field goal (12 plays, 54 yards, 6:46)	LA 10–7
2	12:00	ODU	Ethan Sanchez 39-yard field goal (10 plays, 58 yards, 4:00)	TIE 10–10
2	04:15	ODU	Grant Wilson 3-yard rush (Ethan Sanchez kick) (10 plays, 65 yards, 3:55)	ODU 17–10
2	00:18	LA	Ben Wooldridge 1-yard rush (Kenneth Almendares kick) (8 plays, 72 yards, 3:50)	TIE 17–17
3	12:36	ODU	Reymello Murphy 36-yard pass from Grant Wilson (Ethan Sanchez kick) (6 plays, 65 yards, 2:20)	ODU 24–17
3	04:43	ODU	Reymello Murphy 61-yard pass from Grant Wilson (Ethan Sanchez kick) (3 plays, 68 yards, 1:20)	ODU 31–17
4	14:57	LA	Terrence Williams 1-yard rush (Kenneth Almendares kick) (10 plays, 55 yards, 4:37)	ODU 31–24
4	12:28	ODU	Kelby Williams 37-yard pass from Grant Wilson (Ethan Sanchez kick) (7 plays, 83 yards, 2:24)	ODU 38–24
4	09:13	LA	Jacob Kibodi 37-yard pass from Ben Wooldridge (Kenneth Almendares kick) (7 plays, 90 yards, 3:10)	ODU 38–31

Statistics	Louisiana	Old Dominion
First downs	24	20
Total yards	454	392
Rushing yards	169	145
Passing yards	285	247
Turnovers	0	0
Time of possession	37:31	22:29

Team	Category	Player	Statistics
Louisiana	Passing	Ben Wooldridge	25/36, 285 yards, 2 TDs
Louisiana	Rushing	Jacob Kibodi	10 carries, 54 yards
Louisiana	Receiving	Jacob Bernard	3 receptions, 70 yards
Old Dominion	Passing	Grant Wilson	13/19, 247 yards, 4 TDs
Old Dominion	Rushing	Keshawn Wicks	17 carries, 104 yards
Old Dominion	Receiving	Reymello Murphy	2 receptions, 97 yards, 2 TDs

=== at UAB ===
Louisiana at Alabama–Birmingham

Team	1	2	3	4	Total
• Ragin' Cajuns	0	24	10	7	41
Blazers	0	0	3	18	21

- Date: September 16, 2023
- Location: Protective Stadium
  Birmingham, Alabama
- Game start: 6:02 p.m. CDT
- Elapsed time: 5 hours and 11 minutes
- Game attendance: 21,673
- Game weather: Sunny • Wind: W 3 MPH
- Referee: Trennis Livingston
- TV announcers (ESPN+): James Westling (play-by-play) and Doc Holiday (analyst)

Scoring summary
2	09:11	LA	Jacob Kibodi 30-yard rush (Kenneth Almendares kick) (4 plays, 59 yards, 1:05)	LA 7–0
2	05:35	LA	Zeon Chriss 80-yard rush (Kenneth Almendares kick) (1 play, 80 yards, 0:16)	LA 14–0
2	01:06	LA	Zeon Chriss 6-yard rush (Kenneth Almendares kick) (7 plays, 75 yards, 2:02)	LA 21–0
2	00:00	LA	Kenneth Almendares 46-yard field goal (4 plays, -7 yards, 0:47)	LA 24–0
3	05:46	LA	Kenneth Almendares 37-yard field goal (8 plays, 60 yards, 3:56)	LA 27–0
3	02:09	UAB	Matt Quinn 41-yard field goal (9 plays, 67 yards, 3:32)	LA 27–3
3	01:02	LA	Terrance Carter 11-yard pass from Zeon Chriss (Kenneth Almendares kick) (3 plays, 75 yards, 1:07)	LA 34–3
4	07:11	LA	Elijah Davis 2-yard rush (Kenneth Almendares kick) (11 plays, 80 yards, 7:39)	LA 41–3
4	04:10	UAB	Jacob Zeno 2-yard rush (two-point pass conversion attempt failed) (9 plays, 75 yards, 3:01)	LA 41–9
4	01:33	UAB	Lee Beebe Jr. 1-yard rush (two-point pass conversion attempt failed) (2 plays, 4 yards, 0:49)	LA 41–15
4	00:10	UAB	Samario Rudolph 17-yard pass from Jacob Zeno (two-point pass conversion attempt failed) (7 plays, 28 yards, 1:14)	LA 41–21

Statistics	Louisiana	UAB
First downs	22	21
Total yards	513	396
Rushing yards	305	116
Passing yards	208	280
Turnovers	3	2
Time of possession	29:05	30:55

Team	Category	Player	Statistics
Louisiana	Passing	Zeon Chriss	14/20, 174 yards, 1 TD
Louisiana	Rushing	Jacob Kibodi	7 carries, 108 yards, 1 TD
Louisiana	Receiving	Harvey Broussard	3 receptions, 65 yards
UAB	Passing	Jacob Zeno	27/38, 280 yards, 1 TD, 2 INTs
UAB	Rushing	Jacob Zeno	17 carries, 52 yards, 1 TD
UAB	Receiving	Semario Rudolph	8 receptions, 66 yards, 1 TD

=== Buffalo ===
Buffalo at Louisiana

Team	1	2	3	4	Total
Bulls	0	0	21	17	38
• Ragin' Cajuns	7	3	21	14	45

- Date: September 23, 2023
- Location: Cajun Field
  Lafayette, Louisiana
- Game start: 6:32 p.m. CDT
- Elapsed time: 3 hours and 54 minutes
- Game attendance: 17,674
- Game weather: 93 °F (34 °C) • Weather: Cloudy • Wind: SW 5 MPH
- Referee: Jeremy Parker
- TV announcers (ESPN+): Dan McDonald (play-by-play) and Eric Mouton (analyst)

Scoring summary
1	02:57	LA	Neal Johnson 8-yard pass from Zeon Chriss (Kenneth Almendares kick) (7 plays, 49 yards, 2:56)	LA 7–0
2	04:08	LA	Kenneth Almendares 22-yard field goal (14 plays, 81 yards, 5:52)	LA 10–0
3	12:05	LA	Zeon Chriss 54-yard rush (Kenneth Almendares kick) (4 plays, 64 yards, 1:35)	LA 17–0
3	09:25	UB	CJ Ogbonna 4-yard rush (Alex McNulty kick) (6 plays, 70 yards, 2:30)	LA 17–7
3	08:20	LA	Jacob Kibodi 69-yard rush (Kenneth Almendares kick) (3 plays, 75 yards, 1:23)	LA 24–7
3	06:30	LA	Patrick Mensah 24-yard interception returned (Kenneth Almendares kick) (3 plays, 7 yards, 1:24)	LA 31–7
3	03:06	UB	Ron Cook Jr. 4-yard rush (two-point rush conversion attempt failed) (5 plays, 18 yards, 2:26)	LA 31–13
3	00:47	UB	Ron Cook Jr. 12-yard rush (Ron Cook Jr. two-point conversion rush) (2 plays, 13 yards, 0:50)	LA 31–21
4	13:46	LA	Zeon Chriss 1-yard rush (Kenneth Almendares kick) (6 plays, 75 yards, 2:01)	LA 38–21
4	10:42	UB	Alex McNulty 47-yard field goal (7 plays, 47 yards, 3:04)	LA 38–24
4	07:40	LA	Jacob Kibodi 20-yard rush (Kenneth Almendares kick) (7 plays, 75 yards, 3:02)	LA 45–24
4	04:32	UB	Marlyn Johnson 12-yard pass from Cole Snyder (Alex McNulty kick) (10 plays, 65 yards, 3:08)	LA 45–31
4	02:00	UB	Jacqez Barksdale 1-yard rush (Alex McNulty kick) (8 plays, 57 yards, 2:31)	LA 45–38

Statistics	Buffalo	Louisiana
First downs	19	24
Total yards	373	518
Rushing yards	178	269
Passing yards	195	249
Turnovers	2	3
Time of possession	33:22	26:38

Team	Category	Player	Statistics
Buffalo	Passing	Cole Snyder	17/34, 198 yards, 1 TD, 2 INTs
Buffalo	Rushing	Mike Washington	13 carries, 88 yards
Buffalo	Receiving	Cameron Ball	2 receptions, 51 yards
Louisiana	Passing	Zeon Chriss	22/29, 249 yards, 1 TD, 2 INTs
Louisiana	Rushing	Dre'lyn Washington	13 carries, 103 yards
Louisiana	Receiving	Charles Robertson	4 receptions, 58 yards

=== at Minnesota ===
Louisiana at Minnesota

Team	1	2	3	4	Total
Ragin' Cajuns	7	10	0	7	24
• Golden Gophers	7	7	7	14	35

- Date: September 30, 2023
- Location: Huntington Bank Stadium
  Minneapolis, Minnesota
- Game start: 11:01 a.m. CDT
- Elapsed time: 3 hours and 6 minutes
- Game attendance: 46,843
- Game weather: 76 °F (24 °C) • Weather: Sunny
- Referee: Ron Snodgrass
- TV announcers (BTN): Chris Vosters (play-by-play), Brock Vereen (analyst), and Dannie Rogers (sideline reporter)

Scoring summary
1	10:36	LA	Peter LeBlanc 7-yard pass from Zeon Chriss (Kenneth Almendares kick) (10 plays, 75 yards, 4:24)	LA 7–0
1	02:30	MIN	Daniel Jackson 10-yard pass from Athan Kaliakmanis (Dragan Kesich kick) (9 plays, 86 yards, 5:03)	TIE 7–7
2	13:26	LA	Kenneth Almendares 28-yard field goal (7 plays, 64 yards, 4:04)	LA 10–7
2	07:21	MIN	Athan Kaliakmanis 2-yard rush (Dragan Kesich kick) (10 plays, 75 yards, 6:05)	MIN 14–10
2	01:47	LA	Robert Williams 6-yard pass from Zeon Chriss (Kenneth Almendares kick) (11 plays, 75 yards, 5:41)	LA 17–14
3	08:48	MIN	Zach Evans 18-yard rush (Dragan Kesich kick) (11 plays, 80 yards, 6:09)	MIN 21–17
4	13:45	MIN	Bryce Williams 2-yard rush (Dragan Kesich kick) (8 plays, 42 yards, 3:59)	MIN 28–17
4	05:21	MIN	Daniel Jackson 37-yard pass from Athan Kaliakmanis (Dragan Kesich kick) (7 plays, 56 yards, 4:30)	MIN 35–17
4	03:01	LA	Jacob Kibodi 52-yard rush (Kenneth Almendares kick) (6 plays, 75 yards, 2:20)	MIN 35–24

Statistics	Louisiana	Minnesota
First downs	15	26
Total yards	349	347
Rushing yards	177	201
Passing yards	172	146
Turnovers	2	1
Time of possession	24:25	35:35

Team	Category	Player	Statistics
Louisiana	Passing	Zeon Chriss	14/25, 172 yards, 2 TDs, 2 INTs
Louisiana	Rushing	Zeon Chriss	10 carries, 74 yards
Louisiana	Receiving	Jacob Bernard	2 receptions, 48 yards
Minnesota	Passing	Athan Kaliakmanis	12/14, 146 yards, 2 TDs, 1 INT
Minnesota	Rushing	Zach Evans	15 carries, 85 yards, 1 TD
Minnesota	Receiving	Daniel Jackson	5 receptions, 89 yards, 2 TDs

=== Texas State ===
Texas State at Louisiana

Team	1	2	3	4	Total
Bobcats	10	10	3	7	30
• Ragin' Cajuns	7	7	7	13	34

- Date: October 7, 2023
- Location: Cajun Field
  Lafayette, Louisiana
- Game start: 2:35 p.m. CDT
- Elapsed time: 3 hours and 16 minutes
- Game attendance: 15,053
- Game weather: 71 °F (22 °C) • Weather: Sunny • Wind: NE 14 MPH
- Referee: Trennis Livingston
- TV announcers (ESPNU): Roy Philpott (play-by-play), Roddy Jones (analyst), and Taylor McGregor (sideline reporter)

Scoring summary
1	12:10	TXST	Ismail Mahdi 10-yard rush (Mason Shipley kick) (7 plays, 75 yards, 2:50)	TXST 7–0
1	07:43	LA	Dre'lyn Washington 4-yard pass from Zeon Chriss (Kenneth Almendares kick) (10 plays, 70 yards, 4:27)	TIE 7–7
1	04:21	TXST	Mason Shipley 37-yard field goal (13 plays, 60 yards, 3:16)	TXST 10–7
2	14:24	TXST	Kole Wilson 2-yard pass from TJ Finley (Mason Shipley kick) (9 plays, 48 yards, 2:48)	TXST 17–7
2	06:46	TXST	Mason Shipley 24-yard field goal (9 plays, 92 yards, 5:03)	TXST 20–7
2	03:56	LA	Peter LeBlanc 34-yard pass from Zeon Chriss (Kenneth Almendares kick) (6 plays, 67 yards, 2:43)	TXST 20–14
3	06:59	TXST	Mason Shipley 33-yard field goal (13 plays, 54 yards, 5:52)	TXST 23–14
3	03:45	LA	Zylan Perry 6-yard rush (Kenneth Almendares kick) (7 plays, 82 yards, 3:06)	TXST 23–21
4	10:14	TXST	Joey Hobert 18-yard pass from TJ Finley (Mason Shipley kick) (10 plays, 69 yards, 4:29)	TXST 30–21
4	05:54	LA	Robert Williams 5-yard pass from Zeon Chriss (Kenneth Almendares kick) (11 plays, 63 yards, 4:10)	TXST 30–28
4	02:21	LA	Zeon Chriss 8-yard rush (two-point pass conversion attempt failed) (4 plays, 22 yards, 2:12)	LA 34–30

Statistics	Texas State	Louisiana
First downs	29	21
Total yards	530	423
Rushing yards	204	218
Passing yards	326	205
Turnovers	2	2
Time of possession	33:27	26:33

Team	Category	Player	Statistics
Texas State	Passing	TJ Finley	30/40, 326 yards, 2 TDs, 1 INT
Texas State	Rushing	Ismail Mahdi	34 carries, 188 yards, 1 TD
Texas State	Receiving	Joey Hobert	8 receptions, 132 yards, 1 TD
Louisiana	Passing	Zeon Chriss	13/17, 205 yards, 3 TDs
Louisiana	Rushing	Zeon Chriss	12 carries, 67 yards, 1 TD
Louisiana	Receiving	Robert Williams	5 receptions, 90 yards, 1 TD

=== Georgia State ===
Georgia State at Louisiana

Team	1	2	3	4	Total
• Panthers	0	20	0	0	20
Ragin' Cajuns	0	7	10	0	17

- Date: October 21, 2023
- Location: Cajun Field
  Lafayette, Louisiana
- Game start: 7:05 p.m. CDT
- Elapsed time: 3 hours and 27 minutes
- Game attendance: 20,044
- Game weather: 79 °F (26 °C) • Weather: Clear • Wind: S 9 MPH
- Referee: Scott Broadway
- TV announcers (ESPNU): Courtney Lyle (play-by-play) and Hutson Mason (analyst)

Scoring summary
2	13:07	GSU	Ahmon Green 24-yard pass from Darren Grainger (Liam Rickman PAT failed) (7 plays, 75 yards, 1:53)	GSU 6–0
2	09:49	GSU	Ahmon Green 3-yard pass from Darren Grainger (Isaac Kone kick) (7 plays, 73 yards, 1:57)	GSU 13–0
2	04:23	GSU	Mikele Colasurdo 3-yard rush (Isaac Kone kick) (10 plays, 68 yards, 4:59)	GSU 20–0
2	00:30	LA	Jacob Kibodi 3-yard rush (Kenneth Almendares kick) (5 plays, 27 yards, 0:53)	GSU 20–7
3	09:29	LA	Kenneth Almendares 23-yard field goal (10 plays, 69 yards, 5:31)	GSU 20–14
3	02:01	LA	Terrance Carter 2-yard pass from Zeon Chriss (Kenneth Almendares kick) (9 plays, 54 yards, 4:55)	GSU 20–17

Statistics	Georgia State	Louisiana
First downs	16	15
Total yards	343	289
Rushing yards	129	165
Passing yards	214	124
Turnovers	2	1
Time of possession	27:48	32:12

Team	Category	Player	Statistics
Georgia State	Passing	Darren Grainger	17/22, 211 yards, 2 TDs
Georgia State	Rushing	Marcus Carroll	26 carries, 110 yards
Georgia State	Receiving	Tailique Williams	6 receptions, 81 yards
Louisiana	Passing	Zeon Chriss	14/28, 106 yards, 1 TD, 1 INT
Louisiana	Rushing	Zeon Chriss	17 carries, 119 yards
Louisiana	Receiving	Jacob Bernard	3 receptions, 30 yards

=== at South Alabama ===
Louisiana at South Alabama

Team	1	2	3	4	Total
• Ragin' Cajuns	0	17	16	0	33
Jaguars	0	0	14	6	20

- Date: October 28, 2023
- Location: Hancock Whitney Stadium
  Mobile, Alabama
- Game start: 7:18 p.m. CDT
- Elapsed time: 3 hours and 15 minutes
- Game attendance: 16,709
- Game weather: 81 °F (27 °C) • Weather: Cloudy • Wind: N 6 MPH
- Referee: Wayne Winkler
- TV announcers (ESPN+): Pat Greenwood (play-by-play) and Nick Mobley (analyst)

Scoring summary
2	12:58	LA	Jacob Bernard 33-yard pass from Zeon Chriss (Kenneth Almendares kick) (12 plays, 93 yards, 6:44)	LA 7–0
2	08:15	LA	Neal Johnson 3-yard pass from Zeon Chriss (Kenneth Almendares kick) (7 plays, 41 yards, 3:32)	LA 14–0
2	02:10	LA	Kenneth Almendares 20-yard field goal (9 plays, 34 yards, 4:03)	LA 17–0
3	11:53	USA	Jamaal Pritchett 6-yard pass from Carter Bradley (Diego Guajardo kick) (9 plays, 80 yards, 3:00)	LA 17–7
3	07:32	LA	Kenneth Almendares 42-yard field goal (9 plays, 50 yards, 4:21)	LA 20–7
3	06:09	USA	La'Damian Webb 25-yard rush (Diego Guajardo kick) (3 plays, 89 yards, 1:19)	LA 20–14
3	03:17	LA	Jacob Kibodi 56-yard rush (Kenneth Almendares PAT field) (5 plays, 75 yards, 2:52)	LA 26–14
3	01:07	LA	Kendre' Gant 55-yard fumble returned (Kenneth Almendares kick) (6 plays, 39 yards, 2:04)	LA 33–14
4	00:16	USA	Jamaal Pritchett 39-yard pass from Carter Bradley (two-point pass conversion attempt failed) (6 plays, 58 yards, 0:58)	LA 33–20

Statistics	Louisiana	South Alabama
First downs	19	25
Total yards	348	498
Rushing yards	203	117
Passing yards	145	381
Turnovers	0	5
Time of possession	34:44	25:16

Team	Category	Player	Statistics
Louisiana	Passing	Zeon Chriss	13/17, 145 yards, 2 TDs
Louisiana	Rushing	Jacob Kibodi	23 carries, 119 yards, 1 TD
Louisiana	Receiving	Peter LeBlanc	2 receptions, 37 yards
South Alabama	Passing	Carter Bradley	29/49, 381 yards, 2 TDs, 2 INTs
South Alabama	Rushing	La'Damian Webb	16 carries, 96 yards, 1 TD
South Alabama	Receiving	Jamaal Pritchett	11 receptions, 168 yards, 2 TDs

=== at Arkansas State ===
Louisiana at Arkansas State

Team	1	2	3	4	Total
Ragin' Cajuns	7	3	7	0	17
• Red Wolves	14	6	7	10	37

- Date: November 4, 2023
- Location: Centennial Bank Stadium
  Jonesboro, Arkansas
- Game start: 2:02 p.m. CDT
- Elapsed time: 3 hours and 21 minutes
- Game attendance: 15,881
- Game weather: 72 °F (22 °C) • Weather: Sunny • Wind: SW 8 MPH
- Referee: Marshall Lewis
- TV announcers (ESPN+): Roger Twibell (play-by-play), Pete Cordelli (analyst), and Dorian Craft (sideline reporter)

Scoring summary
1	09:14	ARST	Zak Wallace 18-yard rush (Dominic Zvada kick) (10 plays, 71 yards, 4:00)	ARST 7–0
1	08:59	LA	Peter LeBlanc 87-yard pass from Zeon Chriss (Kenneth Almendares kick) (1 play, 87 yards, 0:12)	TIE 7–7
1	04:14	ARST	Jaylen Raynor 2-yard rush (Dominic Zvada kick) (11 plays, 65 yards, 4:45)	ARST 14–7
2	11:30	ARST	Dominic Zvada 41-yard field goal (13 plays, 62 yards, 4:44)	ARST 17–7
2	04:26	ARST	Dominic Zvada 20-yard field goal (14 plays, 70 yards, 5:26)	ARST 20–7
2	06:09	LA	Kenneth Almendares 24-yard field goal (11 plays, 65 yards, 3:23)	ARST 20–10
3	06:25	LA	Zeon Chriss 1-yard rush (Kenneth Almendares kick) (11 plays, 77 yards, 5:40)	ARST 20–17
3	02:08	ARST	Jaylen Raynor 2-yard rush (Dominic Zvada kick) (11 plays, 75 yards, 4:17)	ARST 27–17
4	01:16	ARST	Dominic Zvada 30-yard field goal (7 plays, 6 yards, 2:34)	ARST 30–17
4	01:02	ARST	Javante Mackey 16-yard fumble returned (Dominic Zvada kick) (1 play, -8 yards, 0:07)	ARST 37–17

Statistics	Louisiana	Arkansas State
First downs	20	26
Total yards	327	426
Rushing yards	64	232
Passing yards	263	194
Turnovers	2	0
Time of possession	25:07	34:53

Team	Category	Player	Statistics
Louisiana	Passing	Zeon Chriss	12/17, 171 yards, 1 TD
Louisiana	Rushing	Dre'lyn Washington	23 carries, 119 yards, 1 TD
Louisiana	Receiving	Peter LeBlanc	6 receptions, 129 yards, 1 TD
Arkansas State	Passing	Jaylen Raynor	18/28, 194 yards
Arkansas State	Rushing	Zak Wallace	15 carries, 88 yards, 1 TD
Arkansas State	Receiving	Ja'Quez Cross	6 receptions, 66 yards

=== Southern Miss ===
Southern Mississippi at Louisiana

Team	1	2	3	4	OT	Total
• Golden Eagles	0	14	7	7	6	34
Ragin' Cajuns	7	7	0	14	3	31

- Date: November 9, 2023
- Location: Cajun Field
  Lafayette, Louisiana
- Game start: 6:33 p.m. CDT
- Elapsed time: 3 hours and 39 minutes
- Game attendance: 15,137
- Game weather: 83 °F (28 °C) • Weather: Sunny • Wind: SW 6 MPH
- Referee: Javarro Edwards
- TV announcers (ESPNU): Courtney Lyle (play-by-play) and Hutson Mason (analyst)

Scoring summary
1	03:13	LA	Dre'lyn Washington 6-yard rush (Kenneth Almendares kick) (10 plays, 75 yards, 4:25)	LA 7–0
2	14:11	USM	Frank Gore Jr. 18-yard pass from Billy Wiles (Andrew Stein kick) (9 plays, 80 yards, 3:55)	TIE 7–7
2	08:47	USM	Kenyon Clay 28-yard rush (Andrew Stein kick) (9 plays, 83 yards, 4:19)	USM 14–7
2	08:34	LA	Zylan Perry 95-yard kickoff returned (Kenneth Almendares kick) (6 plays, 6 yards, 3:33)	TIE 14–14
3	00:04	USM	Frank Gore Jr. 17-yard rush (Connor Gibbs kick) (4 plays, 28 yards, 1:41)	USM 21–14
4	07:22	LA	Harvey Broussard 51-yard pass from Chandler Fields (Kenneth Almendares kick) (2 plays, 62 yards, 0:49)	TIE 21–21
4	05:55	LA	Trayv'on Culbert 7-yard pass from Chandler Fields (Kenneth Almendares kick) (1 play, 7 yards, 0:08)	LA 28–21
4	01:26	USM	Jakarius Caston 9-yard pass from Ethan Crawford (Connor Gibbs kick) (10 plays, 75 yards, 4:29)	TIE 28–28
OT		LA	Kenneth Almendares 34-yard field goal (6 plays, 8 yards)	LA 31–28
OT		USM	Frank Gore Jr. 3-yard rush (4 plays, 25 yards)	USM 34–31

Statistics	Southern Miss	Louisiana
First downs	22	20
Total yards	390	390
Rushing yards	229	130
Passing yards	161	260
Turnovers	2	2
Time of possession	33:33	26:27

Team	Category	Player	Statistics
Southern Miss	Passing	Billy Wiles	10/16, 105 yards, 1 TD
Southern Miss	Rushing	Frank Gore Jr.	33 carries, 158 yards, 2 TDs
Southern Miss	Receiving	Jakarius Caston	3 receptions, 58 yards, 1 TD
Louisiana	Passing	Chandler Fields	24/38, 260 yards, 2 TDs
Louisiana	Rushing	Dre'lyn Washington	12 carries, 82 yards, 1 TD
Louisiana	Receiving	Harvey Broussard	5 receptions, 77 yards, 1 TD

=== at Troy ===
Louisiana at Troy

Team	1	2	3	4	Total
Ragin' Cajuns	7	3	7	7	24
• Trojans	0	17	0	14	31

- Date: November 18, 2023
- Location: Veterans Memorial Stadium
  Troy, Alabama
- Game start: 2:34 p.m. CDT
- Elapsed time: 3 hours and 22 minutes
- Game attendance: 26,621
- Game weather: 72 °F (22 °C) • Weather: Sunny • Wind: SE 9 MPH
- Referee: Wayne Winkler
- TV announcers (NFLN): Doug Sherman (play-by-play) and Tyoka Jackson (analyst)

Scoring summary
1	02:41	LA	Robert Williams 14-yard pass from Chandler Fields (Kenneth Almendares kick) (10 plays, 66 yards, 4:37)	LA 7–0
2	14:55	TROY	Scott Taylor Renfroe 44-yard field goal (7 play, 49 yards, 2:46)	LA 7–3
2	06:56	LA	Kenneth Almendares 35-yard field goal (7 plays, 47 yards, 2:53)	LA 10–3
2	05:39	TROY	Kimani Vidal 13-yard rush (Scott Taylor Renfroe kick) (3 plays, 63 yards, 1:17)	TIE 10–10
2	00:21	TROY	Clayton Ollendieck 1-yard pass from Gunnar Watson (Scott Taylor Renfroe kick) (9 plays, 35 yards, 3:23)	TROY 17–10
3	04:33	LA	Neal Johnson 4-yard pass from Chandler Fields (Kenneth Almendares kick) (9 plays, 73 yards, 5:08)	TIE 17–17
4	13:24	TROY	Chris Lewis 9-yard pass from Gunnar Watson (Scott Taylor Renfroe kick) (14 plays, 83 yards, 6:09)	TROY 24–17
4	07:19	LA	Terrance Carter 4-yard pass from Chandler Fields (Kenneth Almendares kick) (5 plays, 58 yards, 1:43)	TIE 24–24
4	03:46	TROY	Jabre Barber 8-yard pass from Gunnar Watson (Scott Taylor Renfroe kick) (10 play, 75 yards, 3:33)	TROY 31–24

Statistics	Louisiana	Troy
First downs	22	23
Total yards	348	367
Rushing yards	66	148
Passing yards	282	219
Turnovers	1	0
Time of possession	31:46	28:14

Team	Category	Player	Statistics
Louisiana	Passing	Chandler Fields	29/39, 282 yards, 3 TDs, 1 INT
Louisiana	Rushing	Zylan Perry	8 carries, 44 yards
Louisiana	Receiving	Harvey Broussard	3 receptions, 54 yards
Troy	Passing	Gunnar Watson	17/31, 199 yards, 3 TDs
Troy	Rushing	Kimani Vidal	27 carries, 112 yards, 1 TD
Troy	Receiving	Jabre Barber	4 receptions, 74 yards, 1 TD

=== Louisiana–Monroe ===
Louisiana–Monroe at Louisiana

Team	1	2	3	4	Total
Warhawks	7	7	0	7	21
• Ragin' Cajuns	7	24	14	7	52

- Date: November 25, 2023
- Location: Cajun Field
  Lafayette, Louisiana
- Game start: 2:03 p.m. CDT
- Elapsed time: 3 hours and 13 minutes
- Game attendance: 13,892
- Game weather: 68 °F (20 °C) • Weather: Sunny • Wind: NE 7 MPH
- Referee: Marshall Lewis
- TV announcers (ESPN+): Dan McDonald (play-by-play) and Eric Mouton (analyst)

Scoring summary
1	09:36	LA	Chandler Fields 5-yard rush (Kenneth Almendares kick) (9 plays, 50 yards, 4:16)	LA 7–0
1	01:45	ULM	Jiya Wright 2-yard rush (Braxton Guilbeau kick) (14 plays, 77 yards, 7:44)	TIE 7–7
2	14:41	LA	Zylan Perry 3-yard rush (Kenneth Almendares kick) (7 plays, 58 yards, 2:04)	LA 14–7
2	09:41	LA	Kenneth Almendares 24-yard field goal (6 plays, 47 yards, 2:43)	LA 17–7
2	08:25	ULM	Dylan Howell 24-yard fumble returned (Braxton Guilbeau kick) (1 play, -2 yards, 0:08)	LA 17–14
2	02:51	LA	Jacob Kibodi 3-yard rush (Kenneth Almendares kick) (11 plays, 86 yards, 5:24)	LA 24–14
2	00:32	LA	Neal Johnson 24-yard pass from Chandler Fields (Kenneth Almendares kick) (5 plays, 50 yards, 1:59)	LA 31–14
3	13:20	LA	Neal Johnson 28-yard pass from Chandler Fields (Kenneth Almendares kick) (4 plays, 49 yards, 1:37)	LA 38–14
3	04:06	LA	Elijah Davis 10-yard rush (Kenneth Almendares kick) (7 plays, 85 yards, 3:08)	LA 45–14
4	07:14	ULM	Alred Luke 16-yard pass from Blake Murphy (Braxton Guilbeau kick) (13 plays, 51 yards, 4:53)	LA 45–21
4	00:37	LA	Elijah Davis 2-yard rush (Alan Guerrieri kick) (11 plays, 75 yards, 6:37)	LA 52–21

Statistics	Louisiana–Monroe	Louisiana
First downs	16	29
Total yards	239	476
Rushing yards	153	230
Passing yards	86	246
Turnovers	2	1
Time of possession	30:20	29:40

Team	Category	Player	Statistics
Louisiana–Monroe	Passing	Jiya Wright	6/10, 66 yards, 1 INT
Louisiana–Monroe	Rushing	Bennett Galloway	16 carries, 87 yards
Louisiana–Monroe	Receiving	Tyrone Howell	2 receptions, 40 yards
Louisiana	Passing	Chandler Fields	18/20, 246 yards, 2 TDs
Louisiana	Rushing	Elijah Davis	14 carries, 109 yards, 2 TDs
Louisiana	Receiving	Neal Johnson	3 receptions, 67 yards, 2 TDs

=== vs. Jacksonville State (New Orleans Bowl) ===
Jacksonville State vs. Louisiana

Team	1	2	3	4	OT	Total
• Gamecocks	7	7	10	7	3	34
Ragin' Cajuns	7	7	7	10	0	31

- Date: December 16, 2023
- Location: Caesars Superdome
  New Orleans, Louisiana
- Game start: 1:20 p.m. CDT
- Elapsed time: 3 hours and 47 minutes
- Game attendance: 14,486
- Game weather: 74 °F (23 °C) • Weather: Indoor (N/A)
- Referee: Steven Anderson
- TV announcers (ESPN): Anish Shroff (play-by-play), Andre Ware (analyst), and Taylor Davis (sideline reporter)

Scoring summary
1	13:17	LA	Jalen Clark 46-yard fumble returned (Kenneth Almendares kick) (5 plays, 21 yards, 1:43)	LA 7–0
1	03:06	JVST	Cole Fuller 1-yard rush (Garrison Rippa kick) (13 plays, 80 yards, 4:42)	TIE 7–7
2	04:22	LA	Jalen Clark 16-yard interception returned (Kenneth Almendares kick) (3 plays, 6 yards, 0:50)	LA 14–7
2	00:23	JVST	Ron Wiggins 7-yard rush (Garrison Rippa kick) (14 plays, 75 yards, 3:59)	TIE 14–14
3	07:55	JVST	Garrison Rippa 22-yard field goal (16 plays, 72 yards, 5:37)	JVST 17–14
3	05:47	LA	Chandler Fields 1-yard rush (Kenneth Almendares kick) (6 plays, 73 yards, 2:08)	LA 21–17
3	02:53	JVST	Logan Smothers 10-yard rush (Garrison Rippa kick) (8 plays, 75 yards, 2:54)	JVST 24–21
4	14:02	LA	Kenneth Almendares 33-yard field goal (10 plays, 46 yards, 3:51)	TIE 24–24
4	05:32	LA	Tyree Skipper 43-yard interception returned (Kenneth Almendares kick) (6 plays, 8 yards, 1:46)	LA 31–24
4	01:46	JVST	Perry Carter 18-yard pass from Zion Webb (Garrison Rippa kick) (8 plays, 70 yards, 1:51)	TIE 31–31
OT		JVST	Garrison Rippa 27-yard field goal (7 plays, 16 yards)	JVST 34–31

Statistics	Jacksonville State	Louisiana
First downs	31	14
Total yards	526	247
Rushing yards	290	92
Passing yards	236	155
Turnovers	4	0
Time of possession	33:00	27:00

Team	Category	Player	Statistics
Jacksonville State	Passing	Zion Webb	14/26, 156 yards, 1 TD, 2 INTs
Jacksonville State	Rushing	Ron Wiggins	27 carries, 126 yards, 1 TD
Jacksonville State	Receiving	Quinton Lane	7 receptions, 86 yards
Louisiana	Passing	Chandler Fields	13/26, 155 yards
Louisiana	Rushing	Dre'lyn Washington	16 carries, 73 yards
Louisiana	Receiving	Pearse Migl	2 receptions, 34 yards
