= 2024 Mountain West Conference football season =

26th season of Mountain West Conference football in 2024

- League: NCAA Division I FBS
- Sport: Football
- Duration: August 24, 2024 – December 2024
- Teams: 12
- TV partner(s): CBS Sports (CBS, CBSSN); Fox Sports (Fox, FS1, FS2); TNT Sports (TruTV, Max)

2025 NFL draft
- Top draft pick: RB Ashton Jeanty, Boise State
- Picked by: Las Vegas Raiders, 6th overall

Regular season
- Season champions: Boise State
- Runners-up: UNLV; Colorado State

Championship Game
- Date: December 6, 2024
- Venue: Albertsons Stadium, Boise, Idaho
- Champions: Boise State
- Runners-up: UNLV

Seasons
- 2023 2025

2024 Mountain West Conference football standings
	Conf.			Overall
Team	W		L	W		L
No. 8 Boise State y$^	7	–	0	12	–	2
No. 23 UNLV y	6	–	1	11	–	3
Colorado State	6	–	1	8	–	5
Fresno State	4	–	3	6	–	7
San Jose State	3	–	4	7	–	6
Air Force	3	–	4	5	–	7
Hawaii	3	–	4	5	–	7
New Mexico	3	–	4	5	–	7
Utah State	3	–	4	4	–	8
San Diego State	2	–	5	3	–	9
Wyoming	2	–	5	3	–	9
Nevada	0	–	7	3	–	10
Championship: Boise State 21, UNLV 7
^ – College Football Playoff participant; $ – Conference champion; y – Championship game participant; Rankings from AP Poll

The 2024 Mountain West Conference football season will be the 26th season of college football for the Mountain West Conference. It is part of the 2024 NCAA Division I FBS football season. 12 teams will compete in the conference during the season. The season will begin on August 24, 2024, and conclude with the Mountain West Conference Football Championship Game in December 2024. The full season schedule was released on February 29, 2024.

== Conference news ==
For the 2024 season, the Mountain West Conference signed a scheduling agreement with Oregon State and Washington State - the only remaining members of the Pac-12 Conference. All Mountain West teams will play a game against either Oregon State or Washington State. The games will not count toward conference standings, and neither Pac-12 school is eligible for the Mountain West Conference championship game.

On July 1, the Mountain West Conference announced a new broadcasting deal with TNT Sports, with several games to be broadcast on TNT's truTV channel as well as their streaming service Max.

== Preseason ==
=== Preseason Poll ===
The Preseason Media Poll was released July 10, 2024. Boise State was selected as the preseason favorite to claim the 2024 Mountain West football regular-season title.

Predicted finish	Team	Votes (for first)
1	Boise State	543 (38)
2	UNLV	471 (4)
3	Fresno State	460 (4)
4	Air Force	384
5	Colorado State	337
6	Wyoming	296
7	Utah State	285
8	San Diego State	251
9	Hawaii	214
10	San Jose State	185
11	New Mexico	85
12	Nevada	77

=== Preseason All-Conference team ===
Mountain West preseason awards and all-conference teams were announced on July 10.

==== Awards ====
Position	Player	Class	Position	Team
Award
Offensive Player of the Year	Ashton Jeanty	Jr.	RB	Boise State
Co-Defensive Player of the Year	Ahmed Hassanein	Sr.	DL	Boise State
Co-Defensive Player of the Year	Jackson Woodard	Sr.	LB	UNLV
Special Teams Player of the Year	Jacob De Jesus	Sr.	KR/PR	UNLV

==== All-conference team ====
Position	Player	Class	Team
First Team Offense
QB	Mikey Keene	Jr.	Fresno State
RB	Ashton Jeanty	Jr.	Boise State
RB	Malik Sherrod	Sr.	Fresno State
WR	Tory Horton	Gr.	Colorado State
WR	Ricky White III	Sr.	UNLV
WR	Jalen Royals	Sr.	Utah State
TE	John Michael Gyllenborg	Jr.	Wyoming
OL	Kage Casey	So.	Boise State
OL	Jacob Gardner	Gr.	Colorado State
OL	Mose Vavao	Sr.	Fresno State
OL	Tiger Shanks	Sr.	UNLV
OL	Jack Walsh	Jr.	Wyoming
First Team Defense
DL	Ahmed Hassanein	Sr.	Boise State
DL	Devo Bridges	Sr.	Fresno State
DL	Soane Toia	Sr.	San Jose State
DL	Jordan Bertagnole	Gr.	Wyoming
LB	Andrew Simpson	Jr.	Boise State
LB	Chase Wilson	Sr.	Colorado State
LB	Jordan Pollard	Jr.	San Jose State
LB	Jackson Woodard	Sr.	UNLV
DB	A’Marion McCoy	Sr.	Boise State
DB	Jack Howell	Sr.	Colorado State
DB	Cameron Oliver	Sr.	UNLV
DB	Ike Larsen	Jr.	Utah State
First Team Special Teams
PK	Jonah Dalmas	Gr.	Boise State
P	James Ferguson-Reynolds	Jr.	Boise State
PR	Jacob De Jesus	Sr.	UNLV
KR	Jacob De Jesus	Sr.	UNLV

== Coaches ==
=== Coaching changes ===
- On November 13, 2023, San Diego State head coach Brady Hoke announced that he would retire at the conclusion of the season. On November 29, the school announced that Sean Lewis would become the head coach for the 2024 season. Lewis had previously been offensive coordinator at Colorado and the head coach of Kent State.
- On November 25, 2023, New Mexico announced that they had fired head coach Danny Gonzales after four seasons as head coach. Gonzales had posted a 11–32 record during his time at the school. On December 6, New Mexico announced Bronco Mendenhall as the new head coach for the 2024 season. Mendenhall had previously been head coach at BYU and Virginia.
- On December 1, 2023, Nevada announced that they had fired head coach Ken Wilson. Wilson had gone 4–20 in his two seasons with the school. On December 4, Nevada announced Jeff Choate as the new head coach for 2024. Choate had previously been the co-defensive coordinator and inside linebackers coach at Texas and the head coach of Montana State.
- On December 6, 2023, Wyoming head coach Craig Bohl announced that we would retire following Wyoming's 2023 bowl game. Wyoming's defensive coordinator Jay Sawvel was promoted to head coach for 2024.
- On January 16, San Jose State head coach Brent Brennan was announced the new head coach of Arizona of the Big 12 Conference for the 2024 season. On January 21, San Jose State announced Ken Niumatalolo as the school's new head coach. Niaumatalolo had previously been head coach at Navy.
- On July 2, Utah State announced their intention to fire Blake Anderson due to non-compliance with Title IX policies regarding the reporting of disclosures of sexual misconduct. Defensive coordinator Nate Dreiling was named the school's interim head coach.
- On July 15, Fresno State head coach Jeff Tedford announced he would step down as head coach due to health concerns. Current assistant head coach and linebackers coach Tim Skipper was announced as the interim head coach for the 2024 season.

=== Head coaches ===
Team	Head coach	Years at school	Overall record	Record at school	MW record
Air Force	Troy Calhoun	18	130–82	130–82	77–54
Boise State	Spencer Danielson	2	3–1	3–1	2–0
Colorado State	Jay Norvell	3	41–42	8–16	29–27
Fresno State	Tim Skipper (interim)	1	0–0	0–0	0–0
Hawaii	Timmy Chang	3	8–18	8–18	5–11
Nevada	Jeff Choate	1	28–22	0–0	0–0
New Mexico	Bronco Mendenhall	1	135–81	0–0	0–0
San Diego State	Sean Lewis	1	24–31	0–0	0–0
San Jose State	Ken Niumatalolo	1	109–83	0–0	0–0
UNLV	Barry Odom	2	34–30	9–5	6–2
Utah State	Nate Dreiling	1	0–0	0–0	0–0
Wyoming	Jay Sawvel	1	0–0	0–0	0–0

=== Mid-season changes ===
- On December 8, UNLV head coach Barry Odom was announced as the new head coach of Purdue in the Big Ten Conference. UNLV named their wide receivers coach Del Alexander as the interim head coach for the team's bowl game. On December 12, UNLV announced that Dan Mullen would be the new head coach for the 2025 season. Mullen had previously been head coach of Florida in the SEC.

=== Post-season changes ===
- On December 4, Fresno State announced that Matt Entz would become the new permanent head coach beginning in 2025. Entz had previously been the associated head coach at USC
- On December 6, Utah State announced that they had hired Bronco Mendenhall away from New Mexico to become their head coach for 2025. On December 14, New Mexico announced Jason Eck as their new head coach for 2025. Eck had previously been head coach at Idaho.

== Rankings ==
		Pre	Wk 1	Wk 2	Wk 3	Wk 4	Wk 5	Wk 6	Wk 7	Wk 8	Wk 9	Wk 10	Wk 11	Wk 12	Wk 13	Wk 14	Wk 15	Final
Air Force	AP																	
Air Force	C	RV	RV															
Air Force	CFP	Not released																
Boise State	AP	RV	RV	RV	RV	25	21	17	15	17	15	12	13	12	11	10	8	8
Boise State	C	RV	RV	RV	RV	RV	RV	22	19	19	19	14	13	13	11	10	8	9
Boise State	CFP	Not released										12	13	12	11	10	9	
Colorado State	AP													RV				
Colorado State	C													RV				
Colorado State	CFP	Not released																
Fresno State	AP																	
Fresno State	C																	
Fresno State	CFP	Not released																
Hawaii	AP																	
Hawaii	C																	
Hawaii	CFP	Not released																
Nevada	AP																	
Nevada	C																	
Nevada	CFP	Not released																
New Mexico	AP																	
New Mexico	C																	
New Mexico	CFP	Not released																
San Diego State	AP																	
San Diego State	C																	
San Diego State	CFP	Not released																
San Jose State	AP																	
San Jose State	C				RV													
San Jose State	CFP	Not released																
UNLV	AP		RV	RV	RV	RV	25		RV	RV	RV	RV	RV	23	21	19	24	23
UNLV	C	RV	RV	RV	25	23	23	RV	RV	RV	RV	RV	RV	23	21	19	24	24
UNLV	CFP	Not released												24	22	20	24	
Utah State	AP																	
Utah State	C																	
Utah State	CFP	Not released																
Wyoming	AP																	
Wyoming	C																	
Wyoming	CFP	Not released																

Legend
	Improvement in ranking
	Drop in ranking
	Not ranked previous week
	No change in ranking from previous week
RV	Received votes but were not ranked in Top 25 of poll
т	Tied with team above or below also with this symbol

== Schedule ==
The schedule was released on February 29, 2024.

Index to colors and formatting
MW member won
MW member lost
MW teams in **bold**

All times Mountain time.

=== Week 0 ===
Date	Time	Visiting team	Home team	Site	TV	Result	Attendance	Ref.
August 24	2:00 p.m.	No. 4 (FCS) Montana State	**New Mexico**	University Stadium • Albuquerque, NM	FS1	**L** 31–35	17,314	
August 24	6:00 p.m.	SMU	**Nevada**	Mackay Stadium • Reno, NV	CBSSN	**L** 24–29	20,263	
August 24	10:00 p.m.	Delaware State	**Hawaii**	Clarence T. C. Ching Athletics Complex • Honolulu, HI	SPEC PPV	**W** 35–14	12,206	
^{#}Rankings from AP Poll released prior to game. All times are in Mountain Time.

=== Week 1 ===
Date	Time	Visiting team	Home team	Site	TV	Result	Attendance	Ref.
August 29	8:00 p.m.	No. 8 (FCS) Sacramento State	**San Jose State**	CEFCU Stadium • San Jose, CA	truTV / Max	**W** 42–24	13,811	
August 31	1:30 p.m.	**Colorado State**	No. 4 Texas	Darrell K Royal–Texas Memorial Stadium • Austin, TX	ESPN	**L** 0–52	99,171	
August 31	1:30 p.m.	Merrimack	**Air Force**	Falcon Stadium • USAF Academy, CO	CBSSN	**W** 21–6	31,658	
August 31	2:00 p.m.	**Boise State**	Georgia Southern	Paulson Stadium • Statesboro, GA	ESPNU	**W** 56–45	24,134	
August 31	5:00 p.m.	**UNLV**	Houston	TDECU Stadium • Houston, TX	FS1	**W** 27–7	25,750	
August 31	5:00 p.m.	**Nevada**	Troy	Veterans Memorial Stadium • Troy, AL	ESPN+	**W** 28–26	27,412	
August 31	5:30 p.m.	**Fresno State**	No. 9 Michigan	Michigan Stadium • Ann Arbor, MI	NBC	**L** 10–30	110,665	
August 31	5:30 p.m.	UCLA	**Hawaii**	Clarence T. C. Ching Athletics Complex • Honolulu, HI	CBS	**L** 13–16	15,194	
August 31	6:00 p.m.	Texas A&M-Commerce	**San Diego State**	Snapdragon Stadium • San Diego, CA	truTV / Max	**W** 45–14	25,180	
August 31	6:00 p.m.	Robert Morris	**Utah State**	Maverik Stadium • Logan, UT	MWN/KMYU	**W** 36–14	17,037	
August 31	8:30 p.m.	**Wyoming**	Arizona State	Mountain America Stadium • Tempe, AZ	FS1	**L** 7–48	48,108	
August 31	8:30 p.m.	**New Mexico**	No. 21 Arizona	Arizona Stadium • Tucson, AZ (rivalry)	ESPN	**L** 39–61	44,748	
^{#}Rankings from AP Poll released prior to game. All times are in Mountain Time.

=== Week 2 ===
Date	Time	Visiting team	Home team	Site	TV	Result	Attendance	Ref.
September 7	1:00 p.m.	Utah Tech	**UNLV**	Allegiant Stadium • Paradise, NV	MWN/Silver State Sports	**W** 72–14	24,512	
September 7	1:30 p.m.	No. 7 (FCS) Idaho	**Wyoming**	War Memorial Stadium • Laramie, WY	truTV / Max	**L** 13–17	25,070	
September 7	5:00 p.m.	Georgia Southern	**Nevada**	Mackay Stadium • Reno, NV	truTV / Max	**L** 17–20	16,245	
September 7	5:00 p.m.	**San Jose State**	**Air Force**	Falcon Stadium • USAF Academy, CO	CBSSN	**SJSU** 17–7	22,478	
September 7	5:00 p.m.	Northern Colorado	**Colorado State**	Canvas Stadium • Fort Collins, CO	MWN	**W** 38–17	36,573	
September 7	8:00 p.m.	**Boise State**	No. 7 Oregon	Autzen Stadium • Eugene, OR	Peacock	**L** 34–37	58,134	
September 7	8:00 p.m.	No. 8 (FCS) Sacramento State	**Fresno State**	Valley Children's Stadium • Fresno, CA	MWN	**W** 46–30	41,031	
September 7	8:30 p.m.	Oregon State	**San Diego State**	Snapdragon Stadium • San Diego, CA	CBSSN	**L** 0–21	25,318	
September 7	9:00 p.m.	**Utah State**	No. 13 USC	Los Angeles Memorial Coliseum • Los Angeles, CA	BTN	**L** 0–48	68,110	
^{#}Rankings from AP Poll released prior to game. All times are in Mountain Time.

=== Week 3 ===
Date	Time	Visiting team	Home team	Site	TV	Result	Attendance	Ref.
September 13	5:00 p.m.	**UNLV**	Kansas	Children's Mercy Park • Kansas City, KS	ESPN	**W** 23–20	21,493	
September 14	1:30 p.m.	**Nevada**	Minnesota	Huntington Bank Stadium • Minneapolis, MN	BTN	**L** 0–27	44,534	
September 14	2:30 p.m.	No. 12 Utah	**Utah State**	Maverik Stadium • Logan, UT (Battle of the Brothers, Beehive Boot)	CBSSN	**L** 21–38	24,107	
September 14	5:00 p.m.	**Hawaii**	Sam Houston	Bowers Stadium • Huntsville, TX	ESPN+	**L** 13–31	15,134	
September 14	5:00 p.m.	Kennesaw State	**San Jose State**	CEFCU Stadium • San Jose, CA	truTV / Max	**W** 31–10	11,090	
September 14	5:30 p.m.	Colorado	**Colorado State**	Canvas Stadium • Fort Collins, CO (Rocky Mountain Showdown)	CBS	**L** 28–9	40,099	
September 14	5:30 p.m.	**New Mexico**	Auburn	Jordan–Hare Stadium • Auburn, AL	ESPN2	**L** 19–35	88,043	
September 14	5:30 p.m.	**Air Force**	Baylor	McLane Stadium • Waco, TX	FS1	**L** 3–31	46,212	
September 14	7:00 p.m.	BYU	**Wyoming**	War Memorial Stadium • Laramie, WY	CBSSN	**L** 14–34	24,513	
September 14	8:30 p.m.	**San Diego State**	California	California Memorial Stadium • Berkeley, CA	ESPN	**L** 10–31	35,197	
September 14	8:30 p.m.	New Mexico State	**Fresno State**	Valley Children's Stadium • Fresno, CA	truTV / Max	**W** 48–0	39,079	
^{#}Rankings from AP Poll released prior to game. All times are in Mountain Time.

=== Week 4 ===
Date	Time	Visiting team	Home team	Site	TV	Result	Attendance	Ref.
September 20	8:00 p.m.	**San Jose State**	Washington State	Martin Stadium • Pullman, WA	The CW	**L** 52–54 ^{2OT}	24,808	
September 21	12:00 p.m.	**Utah State**	Temple	Lincoln Financial Field • Philadelphia, PA	ESPN+	**L** 29–45	11,384	
September 21	1:00 p.m.	Eastern Washington	**Nevada**	Mackay Stadium • Reno, NV	MWN	**W** 49–16	16,399	
September 21	3:00 p.m.	UTEP	**Colorado State**	Canvas Stadium • Fort Collins, CO	truTV / Max	**W** 27–17	29,151	
September 21	5:00 p.m.	**Wyoming**	North Texas	DATCU Stadium • Denton, TX	ESPN+	**L** 17–44	27,049	
September 21	6:30 p.m.	**Fresno State**	**New Mexico**	University Stadium • Albuquerque, NM	truTV / Max	**FRES** 38–21	18,019	
September 21	7:45 p.m.	Portland State	**Boise State**	Albertsons Stadium • Boise, ID	FS1	**W** 56–14	36,972	
September 21	10:00 p.m.	No. 25 (FCS) Northern Iowa	**Hawaii**	Clarence T. C. Ching Athletics Complex • Honolulu, HI	SPEC PPV	**W** 36–7	11,402	
^{#}Rankings from AP Poll released prior to game. All times are in Mountain Time.

=== Week 5 ===
Date	Time	Visiting team	Home team	Site	TV	Result	Attendance	Ref.
September 28	1:30 p.m.	**Fresno State**	**UNLV**	Allegiant Stadium • Paradise, NV	FS1	**UNLV** 59–14	24,638	
September 28	1:30 p.m.	**San Diego State**	Central Michigan	Kelly/Shorts Stadium • Mount Pleasant, MI	CBSSN	**L** 21–22	27,072	
September 28	6:00 p.m.	**New Mexico**	New Mexico State	Aggie Memorial Stadium • Las Cruces, NM (Rio Grande Rivalry)	ESPN+	**W** 50–40	21,062	
September 28	6:00 p.m.	**Air Force**	**Wyoming**	War Memorial Stadium • Laramie, WY	CBSSN	**WYO** 31–19	23,068	
September 28	8:00 p.m.	Washington State	No. 25 **Boise State**	Albertsons Stadium • Boise, ID	FS1	**W** 45–24	37,711	
^{#}Rankings from AP Poll released prior to game. All times are in Mountain Time.

=== Week 6 ===
Date	Time	Visiting team	Home team	Site	TV	Result	Attendance	Ref.
October 4	7:00 p.m.	Syracuse	No. 25 **UNLV**	Allegiant Stadium • Paradise, NV	FS1	**L** 41–44 ^{OT}	31,329	
October 5	10:00 a.m.	Navy	**Air Force**	Falcon Stadium • USAF Academy, CO (Commander-in-Chief's Trophy)	CBS	**L** 7–34	39,441	
October 5	4:30 p.m.	**Colorado State**	Oregon State	Reser Stadium • Corvallis, OR	The CW	**L** 31–39 ^{2OT}	36,433	
October 5	5:00 p.m.	**Utah State**	No. 21 **Boise State**	Albertsons Stadium • Boise, ID	FS2	**BSU** 62–30	37,210	
October 5	5:30 p.m.	**Nevada**	**San Jose State**	CEFCU Stadium • San Jose, CA	truTV / Max	**SJSU** 35–31	17,099	
October 5	6:00 p.m.	**Hawaii**	**San Diego State**	Snapdragon Stadium • San Diego, CA	CBSSN	**SDSU** 27–24	31,307	
^{#}Rankings from AP Poll released prior to game. All times are in Mountain Time.

=== Week 7 ===
Date	Time	Visiting team	Home team	Site	TV	Result	Attendance	Ref.
October 11	7:00 p.m.	**UNLV**	Utah State	Maverik Stadium • Logan, UT	CBSSN	**UNLV** 50–34	20,295	
October 12	1:30 p.m.	**San Diego State**	Wyoming	War Memorial Stadium • Laramie, WY	CBSSN	**SDSU** 27–24	23,155	
October 12	1:30 p.m.	**San Jose State**	Colorado State	Canvas Stadium • Fort Collins, CO	truTV / Max	**CSU** 31–24	27,280	
October 12	5:00 p.m.	**Air Force**	New Mexico	University Stadium • Albuquerque, NM	truTV / Max	**UNM** 52–37	15,561	
October 12	5:00 p.m.	Washington State	Fresno State	Valley Children's Stadium • Fresno, CA	FS1	**L** 17–25	41,031	
October 12	5:30 p.m.	Oregon State	Nevada	Mackay Stadium • Reno, NV	CBSSN	**W** 42–37	21,541	
October 12	9:00 p.m.	No. 17 **Boise State**	Hawaii	Clarence T. C. Ching Athletics Complex • Honolulu, HI	CBSSN	**BSU** 28–7	15,194	
^{#}Rankings from AP Poll released prior to game. All times are in Mountain Time.

=== Week 8 ===
Date	Time	Visiting team	Home team	Site	TV	Result	Attendance	Ref.
October 18	8:30 p.m.	Fresno State	**Nevada**	Mackay Stadium • Reno, NV	CBSSN	**FRES** 24–21	18,319	
October 19	1:30 p.m.	Hawaii	Washington State	Martin Stadium • Pullman, WA	The CW	**L** 10–42	25,112	
October 19	2:00 p.m.	Wyoming	**San Jose State**	CEFCU Stadium • San Jose, CA	MWN	**SJSU** 24–14	17,101	
October 19	4:00 p.m.	New Mexico	**Utah State**	Maverik Stadium • Logan, UT	truTV / Max	**UNM** 50–45	14,584	
October 19	6:00 p.m.	Colorado State	**Air Force**	Falcon Stadium • USAF Academy, CO (rivalry)	CBSSN	**CSU** 21–13	27,598	
October 19	8:00 p.m.	UNLV	Oregon State	Reser Stadium • Corvallis, OR	The CW	**W** 33–25	35,195	
^{#}Rankings from AP Poll released prior to game. All times are in Mountain Time.

=== Week 9 ===
Date	Time	Visiting team	Home team	Site	TV	Result	Attendance	Ref.
October 25	8:30 p.m.	No. 17 **Boise State**	UNLV	Allegiant Stadium • Paradise, NV	CBSSN	**BSU** 29–24	42,228	
October 26	3:00 p.m.	**New Mexico**	Colorado State	Canvas Stadium • Fort Collins, CO	MWN	**CSU** 17–6	36,980	
October 26	5:00 p.m.	**Utah State**	Wyoming	War Memorial Stadium • Laramie, WY (rivalry)	CBSSN	**USU** 27–25	17,724	
October 26	6:00 p.m.	**San Jose State**	Fresno State	Valley Children's Stadium • Fresno, CA (Battle for the Valley)	truTV / Max	**FRES** 33–10	41,343	
October 26	8:30 p.m.	Washington State	San Diego State	Snapdragon Stadium • San Diego, CA	CBSSN	**L** 26–29	26,937	
October 26	10:00 p.m.	**Nevada**	Hawaii	Clarence T. C. Ching Athletics Complex • Honolulu, HI	SPEC PPV	**HAW** 34–13	12,006	
^{#}Rankings from AP Poll released prior to game. All times are in Mountain Time.

=== Week 10 ===
Date	Time	Visiting team	Home team	Site	TV	Result	Attendance	Ref.
November 1	6:00 p.m.	**San Diego State**	No. 15 **Boise State**	Albertsons Stadium • Boise, ID	FS1	**BSU** 56–24	36,838	
November 2	10:00 a.m.	**Air Force**	No. 21 Army	Michie Stadium • West Point, NY (Commander-in-Chief's Trophy)	CBS	**L** 3–20	30,046	
November 2	2:00 p.m.	**Wyoming**	**New Mexico**	University Stadium • Albuquerque, NM	truTV / Max	**WYO** 49–45	15,046	
November 2	5:00 p.m.	**Hawaii**	**Fresno State**	Valley Children's Stadium • Fresno, CA (rivalry)	SPEC PPV	**HAW** 21–20	41,575	
November 2	6:00 p.m.	**Colorado State**	**Nevada**	Mackay Stadium • Reno, NV	CBSSN	**CSU** 38-21	16,019	
^{#}Rankings from AP Poll released prior to game. All times are in Mountain Time.

=== Week 11 ===
Date	Time	Visiting team	Home team	Site	TV	Result	Attendance	Ref.
November 8	8:30 p.m.	New Mexico	**San Diego State**	Snapdragon Stadium • San Diego, CA	FS1	**UNM** 21–16	21,832	
November 9	1:30 p.m.	San Jose State	Oregon State	Reser Stadium • Corvallis, OR	The CW	**W** 24–13	37,187	
November 9	6:00 p.m.	Nevada	No. 12 **Boise State**	Albertsons Stadium • Boise, ID (rivalry)	FOX	**BSU** 28–21	37,143	
November 9	7:00 p.m.	UNLV	**Hawaii**	Clarence T. C. Ching Athletics Complex • Honolulu, HI	CBSSN	**UNLV** 29–27	12,691	
November 9	7:45 p.m.	Fresno State	**Air Force**	Falcon Stadium • USAF Academy, CO	FS1	**AF** 36–28	14,794	
November 9	8:30 p.m.	Utah State	No. 21 Washington State	Martin Stadium • Pullman, WA	The CW	**L** 28–49	20,011	
^{#}Rankings from AP Poll released prior to game. All times are in Mountain Time.

=== Week 12 ===
Date	Time	Visiting team	Home team	Site	TV	Result	Attendance	Ref.
November 15	6:00 p.m.	**Wyoming**	Colorado State	Canvas Stadium • Fort Collins, CO (Border War)	CBSSN	**CSU** 24–10	36,720	
November 16	1:00 p.m.	**Hawaii**	Utah State	Maverik Stradium • Logan, UT	SPEC PPV	**USU** 55–10		
November 16	1:30 p.m.	Oregon State	Air Force	Falcon Stadium • USAF Academy, CO	CBSSN	**W** 28–0	21,385	
November 16	5:00 p.m.	No. 13 **Boise State**	San Jose State	CEFCU Stadium • San Jose, CA	CBSSN	**BSU** 42–21	20,517	
November 16	8:30 p.m.	**San Diego State**	UNLV	Allegiant Stadium • Paradise, NV	CBSSN	**UNLV** 41–20	30,386	
November 16	7:30 p.m.	No. 18 Washington State	New Mexico	University Stadium • Albuquerque, NM	FS1	**W** 38–35	14,067	
^{#}Rankings from AP Poll released prior to game. All times are in Mountain Time.

=== Week 13 ===
Date	Time	Visiting team	Home team	Site	TV	Result	Attendance	Ref.
November 22	8:00 p.m.	No. 24 **UNLV**	**San Jose State**	CEFCU Stadium • San Jose, CA	FS1	**UNLV** 27–16	13,671	
November 23	1:30 p.m.	**San Diego State**	**Utah State**	Maverik Stadium • Logan, UT	CBSSN	**USU** 41–20	12,583	
November 23	5:00 p.m.	No. 12 **Boise State**	**Wyoming**	War Memorial Stadium • Laramie, WY	CBSSN	**BSU** 17–13	18,094	
November 23	8:30 p.m.	**Colorado State**	**Fresno State**	Valley Children's Stadium • Fresno, CA	CBSSN	**FRES** 28–22		
November 23	8:30 p.m.	**Air Force**	**Nevada**	Mackay Stadium • Reno, NV	FS1	**AF** 22–19	12,228	
^{#}Rankings from AP Poll released prior to game. All times are in Mountain Time.

=== Week 14 ===
Date	Time	Visiting team	Home team	Site	TV	Result	Attendance	Ref.
November 29	10:00 a.m.	Oregon State	No. 11 **Boise State**	Albertsons Stadium • Boise, ID	FOX	**W** 34–18		
November 29	2:00 p.m.	Stanford	**San Jose State**	CEFCU Stadium • San Jose, CA (Bill Walsh Legacy Game)	CBS	**W** 34–31		
November 29	1:30 p.m.	**Utah State**	**Colorado State**	Canvas Stadium • Fort Collins, CO	FS1	**CSU** 42–37		
November 30	1:30 p.m.	**Fresno State**	UCLA	Rose Bowl • Pasadena, CA	BTN	**L** 13–20		
November 30	4:30 p.m.	**Wyoming**	Washington State	Martin Stadium • Pullman, WA	The CW	**W** 15–14		
November 30	6:00 p.m.	**Nevada**	No. 22 **UNLV**	Allegiant Stadium • Paradise, NV (Fremont Cannon)	CBSSN	**UNLV** 38–14		
November 30	8:30 p.m.	**Air Force**	**San Diego State**	Snapdragon Stadium • San Diego, CA	FS1	**AF** 31–20		
November 30	9:00 p.m.	**New Mexico**	**Hawaii**	Clarence T. C. Ching Athletics Complex • Honolulu, HI	SPEC PPV	**HAW** 38–30		
^{#}Rankings from AP Poll released prior to game. All times are in Mountain Time.

=== Week 15 ===
Date	Time	Visiting team	Home team	Site	TV	Result	Attendance	Ref.
December 6	6:00 p.m.	No. 20 **UNLV**	No. 10 **Boise State**	Albertsons Stadium • Boise, ID (Mountain West Conference Championship Game)	FOX	**BSU** 21–7	36,663	
^{#}Rankings from AP Poll released prior to game. All times are in Mountain Time.

== Postseason ==
=== Bowl Games ===
Legend
Mountain West win
Mountain West loss

Bowl game	Date	Site	Television	Time (MST)	Mountain West team	Opponent	Score	Attendance
LA Bowl	December 18	SoFi Stadium • Inglewood, CA	ESPN	7:00 p.m.	No. 24 UNLV	California	W 24–13	24,420
Famous Idaho Potato Bowl	December 23	Albertsons Stadium • Boise, ID	ESPN	12:30 p.m.	Fresno State	Northern Illinois	L 20–28^{2OT}	10,359
Hawaii Bowl	December 24	Clarence T. C. Ching Athletics Complex • Honolulu, HI	ESPN	6:00 p.m.	San Jose State	South Florida	L 39–41^{5OT}	6,720
Arizona Bowl	December 28	Arizona Stadium • Tucson, AZ	The CW	2:30 p.m.	Colorado State	Miami (OH)	L 17–43	40,076
College Football Playoff bowl games
Fiesta Bowl	December 31	State Farm Stadium • Glendale, AZ	ESPN	5:30 p.m.	No. 9 Boise State	No. 4 Penn State	L 14–31	63,854

=== Selection of teams ===
- Bowl eligible (5): Colorado State, Boise State, Fresno State, San Jose State, UNLV
- Bowl ineligible (7): Air Force, Hawaii, Nevada, New Mexico, San Diego State, Utah State, Wyoming

== Mountain West records vs other conferences ==
2024–2025 records against non-conference opponents:

Power Five Conferences	Record
ACC	1–3
Big Ten	0–6
Big 12	2–6
Pac-12	8–7
SEC	0–2
Power 5 Total	11–24
Other FBS Conferences	Record
American	0–4
C-USA	4–1
Independents	0–0
MAC	0–1
Sun Belt	2–1
Other FBS Total	6–7
FCS Opponents	Record
Football Championship Subdivision	11–2
Total Non-Conference Record	28–33

=== Mountain West vs Power 5 matchups ===
This is a list of games the Mountain West has scheduled versus power conference teams (ACC, Big 10, Big 12, Pac-12, and SEC). All rankings are from the current AP Poll at the time of the game.

Date	Conference	Visitor	Home	Site	Score
August 24	ACC	SMU	Nevada	Mackay Stadium • Reno, NV	L 24–29
August 31	SEC	Colorado State	No. 4 Texas	Darrell K Royal–Texas Memorial Stadium • Austin, TX	L 0–52
August 31	Big 12	UNLV	Houston	TDECU Stadium • Houston, TX	W 27–7
August 31	Big Ten	Fresno State	No. 9 Michigan	Michigan Stadium • Ann Arbor, MI	L 10–30
August 31	Big Ten	UCLA	Hawaii	Clarence T. C. Ching Athletics Complex • Honolulu, HI	L 13–16
August 31	Big 12	Wyoming	Arizona State	Mountain America Stadium • Tempe, AZ	L 7–48
August 31	Big 12	New Mexico	No. 21 Arizona	Arizona Stadium • Tucson, AZ	L 39–61
September 7	Big Ten	Boise State	No. 7 Oregon	Autzen Stadium • Eugene, OR	L 34–37
September 7	Pac-12	Oregon State	San Diego State	Snapdragon Stadium • San Diego, CA	L 0–21
September 7	Big Ten	Utah State	No. 13 USC	Los Angeles Memorial Coliseum • Los Angeles, CA	L 0–48
September 13	Big 12	UNLV	Kansas	Children's Mercy Park • Kansas City, KS	W 23–20
September 14	Big Ten	Nevada	Minnesota	Huntington Bank Stadium • Minneapolis, MN	L 0–27
September 14	Big 12	No. 12 Utah	Utah State	Maverik Stadium • Logan, UT	L 21–38
September 14	Big 12	Colorado	Colorado State	Canvas Stadium • Fort Collins, CO	L 9–28
September 14	SEC	New Mexico	Auburn	Jordan–Hare Stadium • Auburn, AL	L 19–45
September 14	Big 12	Air Force	Baylor	McLane Stadium • Waco, TX	L 3–31
September 14	Big 12	BYU	Wyoming	War Memorial Stadium • Laramie, WY	L 14–34
September 14	ACC	San Diego State	California	California Memorial Stadium • Berkeley, CA	L 10–31
September 20	Pac-12	San Jose State	Washington State	Martin Stadium • Pullman, WA	L 52–54 (2OT)
September 28	Pac-12	Washington State	No. 25 Boise State	Albertsons Stadium • Boise, ID	W 45–24
October 4	ACC	Syracuse	No. 25 UNLV	Allegiant Stadium • Paradise, NV	L 41–44 (OT)
October 5	Pac-12	Colorado State	Oregon State	Reser Stadium • Corvallis, OR	L 31–39 (2OT)
October 12	Pac-12	Oregon State	Nevada	Mackay Stadium • Reno, NV	W 42–37
October 12	Pac-12	Washington State	Fresno State	Valley Children's Stadium • Fresno, CA	L 17–25
October 19	Pac-12	Hawaii	Washington State	Martin Stadium • Pullman, WA	L 10–42
October 19	Pac-12	UNLV	Oregon State	Reser Stadium • Corvallis, OR	W 33–25
October 26	Pac-12	Washington State	San Diego State	Snapdragon Stadium • San Diego, CA	L 26–29
November 9	Pac-12	San Jose State	Oregon State	Reser Stadium • Corvallis, OR	W 24–13
November 9	Pac-12	Utah State	Washington State	Martin Stadium • Pullman, WA	L 28–49
November 16	Pac-12	Oregon State	Air Force	Falcon Stadium • USAF Academy, CO	W 28–0
November 16	Pac-12	Washington State	New Mexico	University Stadium • Albuquerque, NM	W 38–35
November 29	Pac-12	Oregon State	Boise State	Albertsons Stadium • Boise, ID	W 34–18
November 29	ACC	Stanford	San Jose State	CEFCU Stadium • San Jose, CA	W 34–31
November 30	Pac-12	Wyoming	Washington State	Martin Stadium • Pullman, WA	W 15–14
November 30	Big Ten	Fresno State	UCLA	Rose Bowl • Pasadena, CA	L 13–20

=== Mountain West vs Group of Five matchups ===
The following games include Mountain West teams competing against teams from the American, C-USA, MAC, or Sun Belt.

Date	Conference	Visitor	Home	Site	Score
August 31	Sun Belt	Boise State	Georgia Southern	Paulson Stadium • Statesboro, GA	W 56–45
August 31	Sun Belt	Nevada	Troy	Veterans Memorial Stadium • Troy, AL	W 28–26
September 7	Sun Belt	Georgia Southern	Nevada	Mackay Stadium • Reno, NV	L 17–20
September 14	C-USA	Hawaii	Sam Houston	Bowers Stadium • Huntsville, TX	L 13–31
September 14	C-USA	Kennesaw State	San Jose State	CEFCU Stadium • San Jose, CA	W 31–10
September 14	C-USA	New Mexico State	Fresno State	Valley Children's Stadium • Fresno, CA	W 48–0
September 21	C-USA	UTEP	Colorado State	Canvas Stadium • Fort Collins, CO	W 27–17
September 21	American	Utah State	Temple	Lincoln Financial Field • Philadelphia, PA	L 29–45
September 21	American	Wyoming	North Texas	DATCU Stadium • Denton, TX	L 17–44
September 28	C-USA	New Mexico	New Mexico State	Aggie Memorial Stadium • Las Cruces, NM	W 50–40
September 28	MAC	San Diego State	Central Michigan	Kelly/Shorts Stadium • Mount Pleasant, MI	L 21–22
October 5	American	Navy	Air Force	Falcon Stadium • USAF Academy, CO	L 7–34
November 2	American	Air Force	Army	Michie Stadium • West Point, NY	L 3–20

=== Mountain West vs FCS matchups ===
Date	Visitor	Home	Site	Score
August 24	Montana State	New Mexico	University Stadium • Albuquerque, NM	L 31–35
August 24	Delaware State	Hawaii	Clarence T. C. Ching Athletics Complex • Honolulu, HI	W 35–14
August 29	No. 8 (FCS) Sacramento State	San Jose State	CEFCU Stadium • San Jose, CA	W 42–24
August 31	Merrimack	Air Force	Falcon Stadium • USAF Academy, CO	W 21–6
August 31	Texas A&M-Commerce	San Diego State	Snapdragon Stadium • San Diego, CA	W 45–14
August 31	Robert Morris	Utah State	Maverik Stadium • Logan, UT	W 36–14
September 7	No. 7 (FCS) Idaho	Wyoming	War Memorial Stadium • Laramie, WY	L 13–17
September 7	Northern Colorado	Colorado State	Canvas Stadium • Fort Collins, CO	W 38–17
September 7	Utah Tech	UNLV	Allegiant Stadium • Paradise, NV	W 72–14
September 7	No. 8 (FCS) Sacramento State	Fresno State	Valley Children's Stadium • Fresno, CA	W 46–30
September 21	Eastern Washington	Nevada	Mackay Stadium • Reno, NV	W 49–16
September 21	Portland State	Boise State	Albertsons Stadium • Boise, ID	W 56–14
September 21	No. 25 (FCS) Northern Iowa	Hawaii	Clarence T. C. Ching Athletics Complex • Honolulu, HI	W 36–7

== Awards and honors ==
=== Player of the week honors ===
Week	Offensive			Defensive			Special Teams			Freshman		
Week	Player	Team	Position	Player	Team	Position	Player	Team	Position	Player	Team	Position
Week 0	Brayden Schager	Hawaii	QB	Jamih Otis	Hawaii	LB	Tylan Hines	Hawaii	PR	Tyson Ruffins	Nevada	OL
Week 1	Ashton Jeanty	Boise State	RB	Jackson Woodard	UNLV	LB	Elliott Nimrod	Utah State	K	Sire Gaines	Boise State	RB
Week 2	Ashton Jeanty (2)	Boise State	RB	Jordan Pollard	San Jose State	LB	Jalen Moss	Fresno State	WR	Greg Burrell	UNLV	RB
Week 3	Nick Nash	San Jose State	WR	Jackson Woodard (2)	UNLV	LB	Caden Chittenden	UNLV	K	Caden Chittenden	UNLV	K
Week 4	Avery Morrow	Colorado State	RB	Tuasivi Nomura	Fresno State	LB	Dylan Lynch	Fresno State	K	Dylan Riley	Boise State	RB
Week 5	Ashton Jeanty (3)	Boise State	RB	Jalen Catalon	UNLV	S	Aaron Rodriguez	New Mexico	P	Caden Chittenden (2)	UNLV	K
Week 6	Ashton Jeanty (4)	Boise State	RB	Trey White	San Diego State	EDGE	Ricky White III	UNLV	WR	Danny O'Neil	San Diego State	QB
Week 7	Ashton Jeanty (5)	Boise State	RB	Jackson Woodard (3)	UNLV	LB	Jordan Noyes	Colorado State	K	Danny O'Neil (2)	San Diego State	QB
Week 8	Devon Dampier	New Mexico	QB	Jalen Catalon (2)	UNLV	S	Caden Chittenden (2)	UNLV	K	Caden Chittenden (3)	UNLV	K
Week 9	Brayden Schager (2)	Hawaii	QB	Cam Lockridge	Fresno State	CB	Tanner Cragun	Utah State	K	Tanner Cragun	Utah State	K
Week 10	Maddux Madsen	Boise State	QB	Phoenix Jackson	Fresno State	LB	Jordan Noyes (2)	Colorado State	K	Kaden Anderson	Wyoming	QB
Week 11	Ashton Jeanty (6)	Boise State	RB	DJ Harvey	San Jose State	CB	Matthew Dapore	Air Force	K	LaJuan Owens	New Mexico	LT
Week 12	Devon Dampier (2)	New Mexico	QB	Jordan Vincent	Utah State	S	Caden Chittenden (3)	UNLV	K	Justin Marshall	Colorado State	RB
Week 13	Bryson Barnes	Utah State	QB	Oscar Aihie	Air Force	ILB	James Ferguson-Reynolds	Boise State	P	Bryson Donelson	Fresno State	RB
Week 14	Micah Alejado	Hawaii	QB	Tyrecus Davis	Wyoming	CB	John Hoyland	Wyoming	K	Micah Alejado	Hawaii	QB

=== Mountain West Individual Awards ===
The following individuals received postseason honors as voted by the Mountain West Conference football coaches at the end of the season.

Award	Player	School
Offensive Player of the Year	Ashton Jeanty, RB	Boise State
Defensive Player of the Year	Jackson Woodard, LB	UNLV
Special Teams Player of the Year	Ricky White III, WR	UNLV
Freshman Player of the Year	Caden Chittenden, PK	UNLV
Coach of the Year	Spencer Danielson	Boise State

=== All-conference teams ===
The following players were selected as part of the Mountain West's All-Conference Teams.

Position	Player	Team
First Team Offense
QB	Devon Dampier	New Mexico
WR	Mac Dalena	Fresno State
WR	Nick Nash	San Jose State
WR	Ricky White III	UNLV
RB	Ashton Jeanty	Boise State
RB	Marquez Cooper	San Diego State
TE	Matt Lauter	Boise State
OL	Kage Casey	Boise State
OL	Ben Dooley	Boise State
OL	Jacob Gardner	Colorado State
OL	Baraka Beckett	New Mexico
OL	Tiger Shanks	UNLV
PK	Caden Chittenden	UNLV
KR	Tyler King	Wyoming
First Team Defense
DL	Ahmed Hassanein	Boise State
DL	Jayden Virgin-Morgan	Boise State
DL	Trey White	San Diego State
DL	Soane Toia	San Jose State
LB	Marco Notarainni	Boise State
LB	Tuasivi Nomura	Fresno State
LB	Jordan Pollard	San Jose State
LB	Jackson Woodard	UNLV
DB	Cam Lockridge	Fresno State
DB	Cam Stone	Hawai‘i
DB	Michael Coats Jr.	Nevada
DB	Jalen Catalon	UNLV
PR	Jacob De Jesus	UNLV
P	Tyler Pastula	San Diego State

Position	Player	Team
Second Team Offense
QB	Hajj-Malik Williams	UNLV
WR	Luke Wysong	New Mexico
WR	Justin Lockhart	San Jose State
WR	Jalen Royals	Utah State
RB	Jai'Den Thomas	UNLV
RB	Rahsul Faison	Utah State
TE	John Michael Gyllenborg	Wyoming
OL	Alex Moore	Air Force
OL	Drew Moss	Colorado State
OL	McKenzie Agnello	New Mexico
OL	Jalen St. John	UNLV
OL	Jack Walsh	Wyoming
KR	Jacob De Jesus	UNLV
PK	Gabe Plascencia	San Diego State
Second Team Defense
DL	Braxton Fely	Boise State
DL	Devo Bridges	Fresno State
DL	Antonio Doyle	UNLV
DL	Cian Slone	Utah State
LB	Buom Jock	Colorado State
LB	Chase Wilson	Colorado State
LB	Malachi Langley	Fresno State
LB	Shae Suiaunoa	Wyoming
DB	Seyi Oladipo	Boise State
DB	DJ Harvey	San Jose State
DB	Robert Rahimi	San Jose State
DB	Johnathan Baldwin	UNLV
PR	Jalen Moss	Fresno State
P	Luke Freer	Air Force

=== National awards ===
- Maxwell Award: Ashton Jeanty, Boise State
- Doak Walker Award: Ashton Jeanty, Boise State

== NFL draft ==
The NFL draft will be held at Lambeau Field in Green Bay, Wisconsin. The following list includes all Mountain West players in the draft.

=== List of selections ===
Player	Position	School	Draft round	Round pick	Overall pick	Team
Ashton Jeanty	RB	Boise State	1	6	6	Las Vegas Raiders
Jalen Royals	WR	Utah State	4	31	133	Kansas City Chiefs
Tory Horton	WR	Colorado State	5	28	166	Seattle Seahawks
Ahmed Hassanein	DE	Boise State	6	20	196	Detroit Lions
Kitan Crawford	S	Nevada	7	9	225	Arizona Cardinals
Ricky White III	WR	UNLV	7	22	238	Seattle Seahawks
Caleb Lohner	TE	Utah State	7	25	241	Denver Broncos
