= 2023 Mountain West Conference football season =

25th season of Mountain West Conference football in 2023

- League: NCAA Division I FBS
- Sport: Football
- Duration: August 26, 2023 – December 2, 2023
- Teams: 12
- TV partner(s): CBS Sports Family (CBS, CBSSN) Fox Sports Family (Fox, FS1, FS2)

2024 NFL draft
- Top draft pick: DE Mohamed Kamara, Colorado State
- Picked by: Miami Dolphins, 158th overall

Regular season
- Season champions: UNLV
- Runners-up: Boise State

Championship Game
- Champions: Boise State
- Runners-up: UNLV

Seasons
- 2022 2024

2023 Mountain West Conference football standings
	Conf.			Overall
Team	W		L	W		L
UNLV y	6	–	2	9	–	5
Boise State y$	6	–	2	8	–	6
San Jose State	6	–	2	7	–	6
Air Force	5	–	3	9	–	4
Wyoming	5	–	3	9	–	4
Fresno State	4	–	4	9	–	4
Utah State	4	–	4	6	–	7
Hawaii	3	–	5	5	–	8
Colorado State	3	–	5	5	–	7
Nevada	2	–	6	2	–	10
New Mexico	2	–	6	4	–	8
San Diego State	2	–	6	4	–	8
Championship: Boise State 44, UNLV 20
$ – Conference champion; y – Championship game participant

The 2023 Mountain West Conference football season was the 25th season of college football for the Mountain West Conference. It was part of the 2023 NCAA Division I FBS football season. 12 teams competed in the conference during the season. The season began on August 26 and concluded on December 2 with the Mountain West Conference Football Championship Game. The full schedule for the season was released on March 2, 2023.

== Conference changes ==
Prior to the 2023 season, the Mountain West Conference announced that it would eliminate divisions, with the two teams with the best conference records now playing in the championship game instead of division winners.

== Preseason ==
=== Preseason Poll ===
The Preseason Media Poll was released July 19, 2023. Boise State has been selected as the preseason favorite to claim the 2023 Mountain West football regular-season title.

Predicted finish	Team	Votes (for first)
1	Boise State	433 (28)
2	Air Force	364 (2)
3	Fresno State	351 (5)
4	San Diego State	338 (1)
5	San Jose State	293
6	Wyoming	281
7	Colorado State	201
8	Utah State	194
9	UNLV	177 (1)
10	Hawai'i	102
11	Nevada	92
12	New Mexico	60

=== Preseason All-Conference team ===
Mountain West preseason awards and all-conference teams were announced on July 19.

==== Awards ====
Position	Player	Class	Position	Team
Award
Offensive Player of the Year	Chevan Cordeiro	Sr.	QB	San Jose State
Defensive Player of the Year	Easton Gibbs	Jr.	LB	Wyoming
Special Teams Player of the Year	Jack Browning	Sr.	PK/P	San Diego State

==== All-conference team ====
Position	Player	Class	Team
First Team Offense
QB	Chevan Cordeiro	Sr.	San Jose State
RB	John Lee Eldridge III	Sr.	Air Force
RB	George Holani	Sr.	Boise State
WR	Tory Horton	Sr.	Colorado State
WR	Justin Lockhart	Jr.	San Jose State
TE	Mark Redman	Sr.	San Diego State
OL	Thor Paglialong	Sr.	Air Force
OL	Cade Beresford	Sr.	Boise State
OL	Mose Vavao	Sr.	Fresno State
OL	Cade Bennett	Jr.	San Diego State
OL	Frank Crum	Sr.	Wyoming
First Team Defense
DL	Payton Zdroik	Jr.	Air Force
DL	Mohamed Kamara	Sr.	Colorado State
DL	Devo Bridges	Sr.	Fresno State
DL	Jordan Bertagnole	Jr.	Wyoming
DL	DeVonne Harris	Jr.	Wyoming
LB	DJ Schramm	Sr.	Boise State
LB	Cody Moon	Jr.	San Diego State
LB	Easton Gibbs	Jr.	Wyoming
DB	Trey Taylor	Sr.	Air Force
DB	Jack Howell	Jr.	Air Force
DB	Cam Stone	Sr.	Hawai'i
DB	Ike Larsen	So.	Utah State
First Team Special Teams
PK	John Hoyland	Jr.	Wyoming
P	Jack Browning	Sr.	San Diego State
PR	Tory Horton	Sr.	Colorado State
KR	Christian Washington	So.	New Mexico

== Coaches ==
=== Coaching changes ===
- On November 28, 2022, UNLV announced that they had fired head coach Marcus Arroyo. Arroyo posted a 7–23 record with the school over three years. UNLV announced on December 6, 2022, that former Missouri head coach Barry Odom would become the new head coach for the 2023 season.

=== Head coaches ===
Team	Head coach	Years at school	Overall record	Record at school	MW record
Air Force	Troy Calhoun	17	121–78	121–78	72–51
Boise State	Andy Avalos	3	17–9	17–9	13–3
Colorado State	Jay Norvell	2	36–35	3–9	26–22
Fresno State	Jeff Tedford	5	118–75	36–18	23–9
Hawaii	Timmy Chang	2	3–10	3–10	2–6
Nevada	Ken Wilson	2	2–10	2–10	0–8
New Mexico	Danny Gonzales	4	7–24	7–24	3–20
San Diego State	Brady Hoke	6	101–84	36–24	23–15
San Jose State	Brent Brennan	7	27–42	27–42	19–28
UNLV	Barry Odom	1	25–25	0–0	0–0
Utah State	Blake Anderson	3	68–47	17–10	11–5
Wyoming	Craig Bohl	10	156–88	52–56	32–38

=== Mid-season changes ===
- On November 12, Boise State announced that they had fired head coach Andy Avalos. Boise State's defensive coordinator Spencer Danielson was named as the interim head coach. On December 3, Danielson was promoted to the school's permanent head coach.

=== Post-season changes ===
- On November 13, San Diego State head coach Brady Hoke announced that he would retire at the conclusion of the season. On November 29, the school announced that Sean Lewis would become the head coach for the 2024 season. Lewis had previously been offensive coordinator at Colorado and the head coach of Kent State.
- On November 25, New Mexico announced that they had fired head coach Danny Gonzales after four seasons as head coach. Gonzales had posted a 11–32 record during his time at the school. On December 6, New Mexico announced Bronco Mendenhall as the new head coach for the 2024 season. Mendenhall had previously been head coach at BYU and Virginia.
- On December 1, Nevada announced that they had fired head coach Ken Wilson. Wilson had gone 4–20 in his two seasons with the school. On December 4, Nevada announced Jeff Choate as the new head coach for 2024. Choate had previously been the co-defensive coordinator and inside linebackers coach at Texas and the head coach of Montana State.
- On December 6, Wyoming head coach Craig Bohl announced that we would retire following Wyoming's 2023 bowl game. Wyoming's defensive coordinator Jay Sawvel was promoted to head coach for 2024.

== Rankings ==
		Pre	Wk 1	Wk 2	Wk 3	Wk 4	Wk 5	Wk 6	Wk 7	Wk 8	Wk 9	Wk 10	Wk 11	Wk 12	Wk 13	Wk 14	Final
Air Force	AP					RV	RV	RV	22	19	17	RV					RV
Air Force	C	RV	RV	RV	RV	RV	RV	RV	22	19	17	RV	RV	RV			RV
Air Force	CFP	Not released									25						
Boise State	AP	RV															
Boise State	C	RV														RV	RV
Boise State	CFP	Not released															
Colorado State	AP																
Colorado State	C																
Colorado State	CFP	Not released															
Fresno State	AP		RV	RV	RV	25	24	RV	RV	RV	RV	RV	RV	RV			
Fresno State	C	RV	RV	RV	RV	RV	24	RV	RV	RV	RV	25	RV	RV			RV
Fresno State	CFP	Not released															
Hawaii	AP																
Hawaii	C																
Hawaii	CFP	Not released															
Nevada	AP																
Nevada	C																
Nevada	CFP	Not released															
New Mexico	AP																
New Mexico	C																
New Mexico	CFP	Not released															
San Diego State	AP																
San Diego State	C																
San Diego State	CFP	Not released															
San Jose State	AP																
San Jose State	C														RV	RV	
San Jose State	CFP	Not released															
UNLV	AP									RV			RV	RV			
UNLV	C								RV	RV	RV	RV	RV	RV	RV		RV
UNLV	CFP	Not released															
Utah State	AP																
Utah State	C																
Utah State	CFP	Not released															
Wyoming	AP		RV	RV				RV	RV								RV
Wyoming	C		RV	RV	RV	RV	RV	RV	RV	RV							RV
Wyoming	CFP	Not released															

Legend
	Improvement in ranking
	Drop in ranking
	Not ranked previous week
	No change in ranking from previous week
RV	Received votes but were not ranked in Top 25 of poll
т	Tied with team above or below also with this symbol

== Schedule ==
The schedule for the 2023 Mountain West football season was announced on March 2, 2023.

Index to colors and formatting
MW member won
MW member lost
MW teams in **bold**

All times Mountain time.

=== Week 0 ===
Date	Time	Visiting team	Home team	Site	TV	Result	Attendance	Ref.
August 26	5:00 p.m.	Ohio	**San Diego State**	Snapdragon Stadium • San Diego, CA	FS1	**W** 20–13	23,867	
August 26	5:30 p.m.	**Hawaii**	Vanderbilt	FirstBank Stadium • Nashville, TN	SECN	**L** 28–35	21,407	
August 26	6:00 p.m.	**San Jose State**	No. 6 USC	Los Angeles Memorial Coliseum • Los Angeles, CA	P12N	**L** 28–56	63,411	
^{#}Rankings from AP Poll released prior to game. All times are in Mountain Time.

=== Week 1 ===
Date	Time	Visiting team	Home team	Site	TV	Result	Attendance	Ref.
September 1	9:00 p.m.	Stanford	**Hawaii**	Clarence T. C. Ching Athletics Complex • Honolulu, HI	CBSSN	**L** 24–37	13,739	
September 2	10:00 a.m.	**Fresno State**	Purdue	Ross–Ade Stadium • West Lafayette, IN	BTN	**W** 39–35	54,898	
September 2	10:00 a.m.	**Utah State**	No. 25 Iowa	Kinnick Stadium • Iowa City, IA	FS1	**L** 14–24	69,250	
September 2	11:00 a.m.	Robert Morris	**Air Force**	Falcon Stadium • Colorado Springs, CO	Altitude/MWN	**W** 42–7	30,142	
September 2	1:30 p.m.	**Boise State**	No. 10 Washington	Husky Stadium • Seattle, WA	ABC	**L** 19–56	67,475	
September 2	2:00 p.m.	Bryant	**UNLV**	Allegiant Stadium • Paradise, NV		**W** 44–14	20,347	
September 2	4:30 p.m.	**Nevada**	No. 6 USC	Los Angeles Memorial Coliseum • Los Angeles, CA	P12N	**L** 14–66	62,196	
September 2	5:00 p.m.	Washington State	**Colorado State**	Canvas Stadium • Fort Collins, CO	CBSSN	**L** 24–50	31,497	
September 2	5:00 p.m.	**New Mexico**	No. 23 Texas A&M	Kyle Field • College Station, TX	ESPN	**L** 10–52	97,560	
September 2	5:30 p.m.	Texas Tech	**Wyoming**	War Memorial Stadium • Laramie, WY	CBS	**W** 35–33 ^{2OT}	26,450	
September 2	8:30 p.m.	Idaho State	**San Diego State**	Snapdragon Stadium • San Diego, CA	CBSSN	**W** 36–28	22,345	
September 3	1:30 p.m.	No. 18 Oregon State	**San Jose State**	CEFCU Stadium • San Jose, CA	CBS	**L** 17–42	20,337	
^{#}Rankings from AP Poll released prior to game. All times are in Mountain Time.

=== Week 2 ===
Date	Time	Visiting team	Home team	Site	TV	Result	Attendance	Ref.
September 9	1:30 p.m.	**UNLV**	No. 2 Michigan	Michigan Stadium • Ann Arbor, MI	CBS	**L** 7–35	109,482	
September 9	2:00 p.m.	Portland State	**Wyoming**	War Memorial Stadium • Laramie, WY	MWN	**W** 31–17	22,121	
September 9	2:00 p.m.	Cal Poly	**San Jose State**	CEFCU Stadium • San Jose, CA	NBCS Bay Area	**W** 59–3	14,224	
September 9	5:00 p.m.	UCF	**Boise State**	Albertsons Stadium • Boise, ID	FS1	**L** 16–18	36,447	
September 9	5:00 p.m.	No. 7 (FCS) Idaho	**Nevada**	Mackay Stadium • Reno, NV	NSN/MWN	**L** 6–33	19,852	
September 9	5:30 p.m.	UCLA	**San Diego State**	Snapdragon Stadium • San Diego, CA	CBS	**L** 10–35	32,017	
September 9	6:00 p.m.	**Air Force**	Sam Houston	NRG Stadium • Houston, TX	CBSSN	**W** 13–3	25,121	
September 9	6:00 p.m.	Tennessee Tech	**New Mexico**	University Stadium • Albuquerque, NM	MWN	**W** 56–10	17,279	
September 9	6:00 p.m.	Idaho State	**Utah State**	Maverik Stadium • Logan, UT	MWN	**W** 78–28	20,034	
September 9	7:00 p.m.	Eastern Washington	**Fresno State**	Valley Children's Stadium • Fresno, CA	MWN	**W** 34–31 ^{2OT}	41,031	
September 9	10:00 p.m.	Albany	**Hawaii**	Clarence T. C. Ching Athletics Complex • Honolulu, HI	Spectrum	**W** 31–20	9,485	
^{#}Rankings from AP Poll released prior to game. All times are in Mountain Time.

=== Week 3 ===
Date	Time	Visiting team	Home team	Site	TV	Result	Attendance	Ref.
September 15	6:00 p.m.	**Utah State**	**Air Force**	Falcon Stadium • Colorado Springs, CO	CBSSN	**AF** 39–21	18,400	
September 16	10:00 a.m.	No. 14 (FCS) North Dakota	**Boise State**	Albertsons Stadium • Boise, ID	FS1	**W** 42–18	35,610	
September 16	1:30 p.m.	**San Diego State**	No. 16 Oregon State	Reser Stadium • Corvallis, OR	FS1	**L** 9–26	35,591	
September 16	5:00 p.m.	**San Jose State**	Toledo	Glass Bowl • Toledo, OH	ESPN+	**L** 17–21	20,039	
September 16	5:00 p.m.	Vanderbilt	**UNLV**	Allegiant Stadium • Paradise, NV	CBSSN	**W** 40–37	22,582	
September 16	6:00 p.m.	**Hawaii**	No. 13 Oregon	Autzen Stadium • Eugene, OR	P12N	**L** 10–55	52,779	
September 16	6:00 p.m.	**Wyoming**	No. 4 Texas	Darrell K Royal–Texas Memorial Stadium • Austin, TX	LHN	**L** 10–31	101,777	
September 16	6:00 p.m.	New Mexico State	**New Mexico**	University Stadium • Albuquerque, NM (Rio Grande Rivalry)		**L** 17–27	27,414	
September 16	8:00 p.m.	**Colorado State**	No. 18 Colorado	Folsom Field • Boulder, CO (Rocky Mountain Showdown)	ESPN	**L** 35–43 ^{2OT}	53,141	
September 16	8:30 p.m.	**Fresno State**	Arizona State	Mountain America Stadium • Tempe, AZ	FS1	**W** 29–0	46,723	
September 16	8:30 p.m.	Kansas	**Nevada**	Mackay Stadium • Reno, NV	CBSSN	**L** 24–31	44,182	
^{#}Rankings from AP Poll released prior to game. All times are in Mountain Time.

=== Week 4 ===
Date	Time	Visiting team	Home team	Site	TV	Result	Attendance	Ref.
September 22	8:30 p.m.	**Boise State**	**San Diego State**	Snapdragon Stadium • San Diego, CA	CBSSN	**BSU** 34–31	23,374	
September 22	8:30 p.m.	**Air Force**	**San Jose State**	CEFCU Stadium • San Jose, CA	FS1	**AF** 45–20	16,124	
September 23	1:30 p.m.	**New Mexico**	UMass	Warren McGuirk Alumni Stadium • Hadley, MA	ESPN+	**W** 34–31 ^{OT}	8,298	
September 23	5:00 p.m.	**Colorado State**	Middle Tennessee	Johnny "Red" Floyd Stadium • Murfreesboro, TN	ESPN+	**W** 31–23	19,806	
September 23	5:00 p.m.	Appalachian State	**Wyoming**	War Memorial Stadium • Laramie, WY	CBSSN	**W** 22–19	21,169	
September 23	5:00 p.m.	**Nevada**	Texas State	Bobcat Stadium • San Marcos, TX	ESPN+	**L** 24–35	19,257	
September 23	6:00 p.m.	James Madison	**Utah State**	Maverik Stadium • Logan, UT		**L** 38–45	19,994	
September 23	7:00 p.m.	**UNLV**	UTEP	Sun Bowl • El Paso, TX	ESPN+	**W** 45–28	28,042	
September 23	8:30 p.m.	Kent State	**Fresno State**	Valley Children's Stadium • Fresno, CA	CBSSN	**W** 53–10	38,728	
September 23	10:00 p.m.	New Mexico State	**Hawaii**	Clarence T. C. Ching Athletics Complex • Honolulu, HI		**W** 20–17	10,254	
^{#}Rankings from AP Poll released prior to game. All times are in Mountain Time.

=== Week 5 ===
Date	Time	Visiting team	Home team	Site	TV	Result	Attendance	Ref.
September 30	10:00 a.m.	**Utah State**	UConn	Rentschler Field • East Hartford, CT	CBSSN	**W** 34–33	21,227	
September 30	2:00 p.m.	**Boise State**	Memphis	Simmons Bank Liberty Stadium • Memphis, TN	ESPN2	**L** 32–35	30,364	
September 30	2:00 p.m.	**Hawaii**	**UNLV**	Allegiant Stadium • Paradise, NV		**UNLV** 44–20	25,328	
September 30	2:00 p.m.	**New Mexico**	**Wyoming**	War Memorial Stadium • Laramie, WY		**WYO** 35–26	25,477	
September 30	5:00 p.m.	Utah Tech	**Colorado State**	Canvas Stadium • Fort Collins, CO		**W** 41–20	27,932	
September 30	6:00 p.m.	**San Diego State**	**Air Force**	Falcon Stadium • Colorado Springs, CO	CBSSN	**AF** 49–10	24,869	
September 30	8:30 p.m.	**Nevada**	No. 25 **Fresno State**	Valley Children's Stadium • Fresno, CA	FS1	**FRES** 27–9	39,246	
^{#}Rankings from AP Poll released prior to game. All times are in Mountain Time.

=== Week 6 ===
Date	Time	Visiting team	Home team	Site	TV	Result	Attendance	Ref.
October 7	6:00 p.m.	**Colorado State**	**Utah State**	Maverik Stadium • Logan, UT		**USU** 44–24	22,864	
October 7	6:00 p.m.	No. 24 **Fresno State**	**Wyoming**	War Memorial Stadium • Laramie, WY	FOX	**WYO** 24–19	20,788	
October 7	6:00 p.m.	**San Jose State**	**Boise State**	Albertsons Stadium • Boise, ID	CBSSN	**BSU** 35–27	37,491	
^{#}Rankings from AP Poll released prior to game. All times are in Mountain Time.

=== Week 7 ===
Date	Time	Visiting team	Home team	Site	TV	Result	Attendance	Ref.
October 13	6:00 p.m.	Fresno State	Utah State	Maverik Stadium • Logan, UT	CBSSN	**FRES** 37–32	17,220	
October 14	3:00 p.m.	UNLV	Nevada	Mackay Stadium • Reno, NV (Fremont Cannon)		**UNLV** 45–27	24,578	
October 14	4:00 p.m.	San Jose State	New Mexico	University Stadium • Albuquerque, NM		**SJSU** 52–24	13,027	
October 14	6:00 p.m.	Wyoming	Air Force	Falcon Stadium • Colorado Springs, CO	CBSSN	**AF** 34–27	28,311	
October 14	7:45 p.m.	Boise State	Colorado State	Canvas Stadium • Fort Collins, CO		**CSU** 31–30	34,901	
October 14	9:00 p.m.	San Diego State	Hawaii	Clarence T. C. Ching Athletics Complex • Honolulu, HI	CBSSN	**SDSU** 41–34	10,039	
^{#}Rankings from AP Poll released prior to game. All times are in Mountain Time.

=== Week 8 ===
Date	Time	Visiting team	Home team	Site	TV	Result	Attendance	Ref.
October 21	10:00 a.m.	No. 22 **Air Force**	Navy	Navy–Marine Corps Memorial Stadium • Annapolis, MD (Commander-in-Chief's Trophy)	CBS	**W** 17–6	38,803	
October 21	4:00 p.m.	**Hawaii**	**New Mexico**	University Stadium • Albuquerque, NM		**UNM** 42–21	13,723	
October 21	5:00 p.m.	**Colorado State**	**UNLV**	Allegiant Stadium • Paradise, NV		**UNLV** 25–23	22,585	
October 21	5:00 p.m.	**Utah State**	**San Jose State**	CEFCU Stadium • San Jose, CA	CBSSN	**SJSU** 42–21	15,028	
October 21	7:00 p.m.	**Nevada**	**San Diego State**	Snapdragon Stadium • San Diego, CA	FS2	**NEV** 6–0	27,122	
^{#}Rankings from AP Poll released prior to game. All times are in Mountain Time.

=== Week 9 ===
Date	Time	Visiting team	Home team	Site	TV	Result	Attendance	Ref.
October 28	3:30 p.m.	**Wyoming**	**Boise State**	Albertsons Stadium • Boise, ID	FS2	**BSU** 32–7	35,189	
October 28	5:00 p.m.	No. 19 **Air Force**	**Colorado State**	Canvas Stadium • Fort Collins, CO (Ram–Falcon Trophy)	CBSSN	**AF** 30–13	22,570	
October 28	8:30 p.m.	**New Mexico**	**Nevada**	Mackay Stadium • Reno, NV	CBSSN	**NEV** 34–24	13,083	
October 28	8:30 p.m.	**UNLV**	**Fresno State**	Valley Children's Stadium • Fresno, CA	FS1	**FRES** 31–24	41,031	
October 28	10:00 p.m.	**San Jose State**	**Hawaii**	Clarence T. C. Ching Athletics Complex • Honolulu, HI (Dick Tomey Legacy Game)		**SJSU** 35–0	11,486	
^{#}Rankings from AP Poll released prior to game. All times are in Mountain Time.

=== Week 10 ===
Date	Time	Visiting team	Home team	Site	TV	Result	Attendance	Ref.
November 3	6:00 p.m.	**Colorado State**	**Wyoming**	War Memorial Stadium • Laramie, WY (Border War)	CBSSN	**WYO** 24–15	27,905	
November 4	12:30 p.m.	No. 25 **Air Force**	Army	Empower Field at Mile High • Denver, CO (Commander-in-Chief's Trophy)	CBSSN	**L** 3–23	52,401	
November 4	2:00 p.m.	**Hawaii**	**Nevada**	Mackay Stadium • Reno, NV		**HAW** 27–14	15,540	
November 4	4:00 p.m.	**UNLV**	**New Mexico**	University Stadium • Albuquerque, NM		**UNLV** 56–14	12,353	
November 4	5:00 p.m.	**Utah State**	**San Diego State**	Snapdragon Stadium • San Diego, CA	FS2	**USU** 32–24 ^{2OT}	23,096	
November 4	8:00 p.m.	**Boise State**	**Fresno State**	Valley Children's Stadium • Fresno, CA (rivalry)	CBSSN	**FRES** 37–30	41,031	
^{#}Rankings from College Football Playoff. All times are in Mountain Time.

=== Week 11 ===
Date	Time	Visiting team	Home team	Site	TV	Result	Attendance	Ref.
November 10	8:45 p.m.	Wyoming	UNLV	Allegiant Stadium • Paradise, NV	FS1	**UNLV** 34–14	25,568	
November 11	1:00 p.m.	Nevada	Utah State	Maverik Stadium • Logan, UT		**USU** 41–24	17,760	
November 11	5:00 p.m.	San Diego State	Colorado State	Canvas Stadium • Fort Collins, CO	CBSSN	**CSU** 22–19	22,033	
November 11	8:00 p.m.	New Mexico	Boise State	Albertsons Stadium • Boise, ID	FS1	**BSU** 42–14	34,076	
November 11	8:30 p.m.	Fresno State	San Jose State	CEFCU Stadium • San Jose, CA (rivalry)	CBSSN	**SJSU** 42–18	18,886	
November 11	9:00 p.m.	Air Force	Hawaii	Clarence T. C. Ching Athletics Complex • Honolulu, HI (rivalry)		**HAW** 27–13	12,742	
^{#}Rankings from College Football Playoff. All times are in Mountain Time.

=== Week 12 ===
Date	Time	Visiting team	Home team	Site	TV	Result	Attendance	Ref.
November 18	12:00 p.m.	Hawaii	Wyoming	War Memorial Stadium • Laramie, WY (rivalry)		**WYO** 42–9	18,233	
November 18	1:00 p.m.	Nevada	Colorado State	Canvas Stadium • Fort Collins, CO		**CSU** 30–20	20,121	
November 18	1:30 p.m.	UNLV	Air Force	Falcon Stadium • Colorado Springs, CO	CBSSN	**UNLV** 31–27	23,574	
November 18	5:00 p.m.	Boise State	Utah State	Maverik Stadium • Logan, UT	CBSSN	**BSU** 45–10	17,821	
November 18	8:30 p.m.	New Mexico	Fresno State	Valley Children's Stadium • Fresno, CA	FS1	**UNM** 25–17	38,569	
November 18	8:30 p.m.	San Diego State	San Jose State	CEFCU Stadium • San Jose, CA	CBSSN	**SJSU** 24–13	16,224	
^{#}Rankings from College Football Playoff. All times are in Mountain Time.

=== Week 13 ===
Date	Time	Visiting team	Home team	Site	TV	Result	Attendance	Ref.
November 24	1:30 p.m.	Utah State	New Mexico	University Stadium • Albuquerque, NM	CBSSN	**USU** 44–41 ^{2OT}	12,094	
November 24	2:00 p.m.	Air Force	Boise State	Albertsons Stadium • Boise, ID	FS1	**BSU** 27–19	36,390	
November 25	1:00 p.m.	San Jose State	UNLV	Allegiant Stadium • Paradise, NV		**SJSU** 37–31	25,554	
November 25	7:00 p.m.	Wyoming	Nevada	Mackay Stadium • Reno, NV	CBSSN	**WYO** 42–6	12,044	
November 25	8:30 p.m.	Fresno State	San Diego State	Snapdragon Stadium • San Diego, CA (rivalry)	FS1	**SDSU** 33–18	22,000	
November 25	9:00 p.m.	Colorado State	Hawaii	Clarence T. C. Ching Athletics Complex • Honolulu, HI		**HAW** 27–24	11,013	
^{#}Rankings from College Football Playoff. All times are in Mountain Time.

=== Championship Game ===
Date	Time	Visiting team	Home team	Site	TV	Result	Attendance	Ref.
December 2	1:00 p.m.	**Boise State**	**UNLV**	Allegiant Stadium • Paradise, NV (Mountain West Championship Game)	FOX	**BSU** 44–20	31,473	
^{#}Rankings from College Football Playoff. All times are in Mountain Time.

== Postseason ==
=== Bowl Games ===
Legend
Mountain West win
Mountain West loss

Bowl game	Date	Site	Television	Time (MST)	Mountain West team	Opponent	Score	Attendance
New Mexico Bowl	December 16	University Stadium • Albuquerque, NM	ESPN	3:45 p.m.	Fresno State	New Mexico State	W 37–10	30,822
LA Bowl	December 16	SoFi Stadium • Inglewood, CA	ABC	5:30 p.m.	Boise State	UCLA	L 22–35	32,780
Armed Forces Bowl	December 23	Amon G. Carter Stadium • Fort Worth, TX	ABC	1:30 p.m.	Air Force	James Madison	W 31–21	30,828
Famous Idaho Potato Bowl	December 23	Albertsons Stadium • Boise, ID	ESPN	1:30 p.m.	Utah State	Georgia State	L 22–45	12,168
Hawaii Bowl	December 23	Clarence T. C. Ching Athletics Complex • Honolulu, HI	ESPN	8:30 p.m.	San Jose State	Coastal Carolina	L 14–24	7,089
Guaranteed Rate Bowl	December 26	Chase Field • Phoenix, AZ	ESPN	7:00 p.m.	UNLV	Kansas	L 36–49	
Arizona Bowl	December 30	Arizona Stadium • Tucson, AZ	Barstool / The CW	2:00 p.m.	Wyoming	Toledo	W 16–15	

=== Selection of teams ===
- Bowl eligible (7): Air Force, Boise State, Fresno State, San Jose State, UNLV, Utah State, Wyoming
- Bowl ineligible (5): Colorado State, Hawaii, Nevada, New Mexico, San Diego State

== Mountain West records vs other conferences ==
2023–2024 records against non-conference foes:

Power Conferences 5	Record
ACC	0–0
Big Ten	1–2
Big 12	1–3
Pac-12	1–10
Notre Dame	0–0
SEC	1–2
Power 5 Total	4–17
Other FBS Conferences	Record
American	1–1
C-USA	4–1
Independents (Excluding Notre Dame)	2–1
MAC	2–1
Sun Belt	1–2
Other FBS Total	10–6
FCS Opponents	Record
Football Championship Subdivision	11–1
Total Non-Conference Record	25–24

Postseason

Power Five Conferences	Record
ACC	0–0
Big 12	0–1
Big Ten	0–0
Notre Dame	0–0
Pac-12	0–1
SEC	0–0
Power 5 Total	0–2
Other FBS Conferences	Record
American	0–0
C–USA	1–0
Independents (Excluding Notre Dame)	0–0
MAC	1–0
Sun Belt	1-2
Other FBS Total	3-2
Total Bowl Record	3–4

=== Mountain West vs Power 5 matchups ===
This is a list of games the Mountain West has scheduled versus power conference teams (ACC, Big 10, Big 12, Pac-12, Notre Dame and SEC). All rankings are from the current AP Poll at the time of the game.

Date	Conference	Visitor	Home	Site	Score
August 26	SEC	Hawaii	Vanderbilt	FirstBank Stadium • Nashville, TN	L 28–35
August 26	Pac-12	San Jose State	No. 6 USC	Los Angeles Memorial Coliseum • Los Angeles, CA	L 28–56
September 1	Pac-12	Stanford	Hawaii	Clarence T. C. Ching Athletics Complex • Honolulu, HI	L 24–37
September 2	Pac-12	Boise State	No. 10 Washington	Husky Stadium • Seattle, WA	L 19–56
September 2	Pac-12	Washington State	Colorado State	Canvas Stadium • Fort Collins, CO	L 24–50
September 2	Big Ten	Fresno State	Purdue	Ross–Ade Stadium • West Lafayette, IN	W 39–35
September 2	Pac-12	Nevada	No. 6 USC	Los Angeles Memorial Coliseum • Los Angeles, CA	L 14–66
September 2	SEC	New Mexico	No. 23 Texas A&M	Kyle Field • College Station, TX	L 10–52
September 2	Big Ten	Utah State	No. 25 Iowa	Kinnick Stadium • Iowa City, IA	L 14–24
September 2	Big 12	Texas Tech	Wyoming	War Memorial Stadium • Laramie, WY	W 35–33 ^{2OT}
September 3	Pac-12	No. 18 Oregon State	San Jose State	CEFCU Stadium • San Jose, CA	L 17–42
September 9	Big 12	UCF	Boise State	Albertsons Stadium • Boise, ID	L 16–18
September 9	Pac-12	UCLA	San Diego State	Snapdragon Stadium • San Diego, CA	L 10–35
September 9	Big Ten	UNLV	No. 2 Michigan	Michigan Stadium • Ann Arbor, MI	L 7–35
September 16	Pac-12	Colorado State	No. 18 Colorado	Folsom Field • Boulder, CO	L 35–43 ^{2OT}
September 16	Pac-12	Fresno State	Arizona State	Sun Devil Stadium • Tempe, AZ	W 29–0
September 16	Pac-12	Hawaii	No. 13 Oregon	Autzen Stadium • Eugene, OR	L 10–55
September 16	Big 12	Kansas	Nevada	Mackay Stadium • Reno, NV	L 24–31
September 16	Pac-12	San Diego State	No. 16 Oregon State	Reser Stadium • Corvallis, OR	L 9–26
September 16	SEC	Vanderbilt	UNLV	Allegiant Stadium • Paradise, NV	W 40–37
September 16	Big 12	Wyoming	No. 4 Texas	Darrell K Royal–Texas Memorial Stadium • Austin, TX	L 10–31

=== Mountain West vs Group of Five matchups ===
The following games include Mountain West teams competing against teams from the American, C-USA, MAC, or Sun Belt.

Date	Conference	Visitor	Home	Site	Score
August 26	MAC	Ohio	San Diego State	Snapdragon Stadium • San Diego, CA	W 20–13
September 9	C-USA	Air Force	Sam Houston	NRG Stadium • Houston, TX	W 13–3
September 16	C-USA	New Mexico State	New Mexico	University Stadium • Albuquerque, NM	L 17–27
September 16	MAC	San Jose State	Toledo	Glass Bowl • Toledo, OH	L 17–21
September 23	C-USA	Colorado State	Middle Tennessee	Johnny "Red" Floyd Stadium • Murfreesboro, TN	W 31–23
September 23	MAC	Kent State	Fresno State	Valley Children's Stadium • Fresno, CA	W 53–10
September 23	C-USA	New Mexico State	Hawaii	Clarence T. C. Ching Athletics Complex • Honolulu, HI	W 20–17
September 23	Sun Belt	Nevada	Texas State	Bobcat Stadium • San Marcos, TX	L 24–35
September 23	C-USA	UNLV	UTEP	Sun Bowl • El Paso, TX	W 45–28
September 23	Sun Belt	James Madison	Utah State	Maverik Stadium • Logan, UT	L 38–45
September 23	Sun Belt	Appalachian State	Wyoming	War Memorial Stadium • Laramie, WY	W 22–19
September 30	American	Boise State	Memphis	Simmons Bank Liberty Stadium • Memphis, TN	L 32–35
October 21	American	No. 22 Air Force	Navy	Navy–Marine Corps Memorial Stadium • Annapolis, MD	W 17–6

=== Mountain West vs FBS independents matchups ===
The following games include Mountain West teams competing against FBS Independents, which includes Army, UConn, or UMass.

Date	Visitor	Home	Site	Score
September 23	New Mexico	UMass	Warren McGuirk Alumni Stadium • Hadley, MA	W 34–31 ^{OT}
September 30	Utah State	UConn	Rentschler Field • East Hartford, CT	W 34–33
November 4	No. 25 Air Force	Army	Empower Field at Mile High • Denver, CO	L 3–23

=== Mountain West vs FCS matchups ===
Date	Visitor	Home	Site	Score
September 2	Robert Morris	Air Force	Falcon Stadium • Colorado Springs, CO	W 42–7
September 2	Idaho State	San Diego State	Snapdragon Stadium • San Diego, CA	W 36–28
September 2	Bryant	UNLV	Allegiant Stadium • Paradise, NV	W 44–14
September 9	Eastern Washington	Fresno State	Valley Children's Stadium • Fresno, CA	W 34–31 ^{2OT}
September 9	Albany	Hawaii	Clarence T. C. Ching Athletics Complex • Honolulu, HI	W 31–20
September 9	No. 7 (FCS) Idaho	Nevada	Mackay Stadium • Reno, NV	L 7–33
September 9	Tennessee Tech	New Mexico	University Stadium • Albuquerque, NM	W 56–10
September 9	Cal Poly	San Jose State	CEFCU Stadium • San Jose, CA	W 59–3
September 9	Idaho State	Utah State	Maverik Stadium • Logan, UT	W 78–28
September 9	Portland State	Wyoming	War Memorial Stadium • Laramie, WY	W 31–17
September 16	No. 14 (FCS) North Dakota	Boise State	Albertsons Stadium • Boise, ID	W 42–18
September 30	Utah Tech	Colorado State	Canvas Stadium • Fort Collins, CO	W 41–20

== Awards and honors ==
=== Player of the week honors ===
Week	Offensive			Defensive			Special Teams			Freshman		
Week	Player	Team	Position	Player	Team	Position	Player	Team	Position	Player	Team	Position
Week 0	Nick Nash	San Jose State	WR	Cody Moon	San Diego State	LB	Jack Browning	San Diego State	K/P	Pofele Ashlock	Hawaii	WR
Week 1	Mikey Keene	Fresno State	QB	Levelle Bailey	Fresno State	LB	John Hoyland	Wyoming	K	Pofele Ashlock (2)	Hawaii	WR
Week 2	Dylan Hopkins	New Mexico	QB	Alec Mock	Air Force	LB	Matthew Dapore	Air Force	K	Matthew Coleman	San Jose State	WR
Week 3	Emmanuel Michel	Air Force	FB	Carlton Johnson	Fresno State	DB	Jose Pizano	UNLV	K	Jayden Maiava	UNLV	QB
Week 4	Ashton Jeanty	Boise State	RB	Wrook Brown	Wyoming	DB	Jakorey Hawkins	Wyoming	CB	Jai'Den Thomas	UNLV	RB
Week 5	Zac Larrier	Air Force	QB	Wyett Ekeler	Wyoming	S	Ike Larsen	Utah State	S	Brayden Fowler-Nicolosi	Colorado State	QB
Week 6	Andrew Peasley	Wyoming	QB	Ike Larsen	Utah State	S	James Ferguson-Reynolds	Boise State	P	Maddux Madsen	Boise State	QB
Week 7	Kairee Robinson	San Jose State	RB	Trey Taylor	Air Force	DB	Jack Browning (2)	San Diego State	K/P	Brayden Fowler-Nicolsi (2)	Colorado State	QB
Week 8	Dylan Hopkins (2)	New Mexico	QB	Jermarius Lewis	New Mexico	S	Jose Pizano (2)	UNLV	K	Jayden Maiava (2)	UNLV	QB
Week 9	Eric McAlister	Boise State	WR	Dean Clark	Fresno State	S	Brandon Talton	Nevada	K	Maddux Madsen (2)	Boise State	QB
Week 10	Ricky White III	UNLV	WR	Ike Larsen (2)	Utah State	S	Malik Sherrod	Fresno State	RB	Jayden Maiava (3)	UNLV	QB
Week 11	Kairee Robinson (2)	San Jose State	RB	Peter Manuma	Hawaii	DB	Jose Pizano (3)	UNLV	K	Jayden Maiava (4)	UNLV	QB
Week 12	Jacory Croskey-Merritt	New Mexico	RB	Marsel McDuffie	UNLV	LB	Jordan Noyes	Colorado State	K	Jayden Maiava (5)	UNLV	QB
Week 13	Levi Williams	Utah State	QB	Wyett Ekeler (2)	Wyoming	S	Jack Browning (3)	San Diego State	K/P	Marcus Ratcliffe	San Diego State	S

=== Mountain West Individual Awards ===
The following individuals received postseason honors as voted by the Mountain West Conference football coaches at the end of the season.

Award	Player	School
Offensive Player of the Year	Ashton Jeanty, RB	Boise State
Defensive Player of the Year	Mohamed Kamara, DE	Colorado State
Special Teams Player of the Year	Jose Pizano, K	UNLV
Freshman Player of the Year	Jayden Maiava, QB	UNLV
Coach of the Year	Barry Odom	UNLV

=== All-conference teams ===
The following players were selected as part of the Mountain West's All-Conference Teams.

Position	Player	Team
First Team Offense
WR	Tory Horton	Colorado State
WR	Ricky White III	UNLV
WR	Jalen Royals	Utah State
OL	Thor Paglialong	Air Force
OL	Cade Beresford	Boise State
OL	J. C. Davis	New Mexico
OL	Tiger Shanks	UNLV
OL	Frank Crum	Wyoming
TE	Dallin Holker	Colorado State
QB	Chevan Cordeiro	San Jose State
RB	Ashton Jeanty	Boise State
RB	Kairee Robinson	San Jose State
KR	Jacob De Jesus	UNLV
PK	Jose Pizano	UNLV
First Team Defense
DL	PJ Ramsey	Air Force
DL	Ahmed Hassanein	Boise State
DL	Mohamed Kamara	Colorado State
DL	Tre Smith	San Jose State
LB	Bo Richter	Air Force
LB	Jackson Woodard	UNLV
LB	MJ Tafisi Jr.	Utah State
LB	Easton Gibbs	Wyoming
DB	Trey Taylor	Air Force
DB	Jack Howell	Colorado State
DB	Emany Johnson	Nevada
DB	Ike Larsen	Utah State
PR	Jacob De Jesus	UNLV
P	James Ferguson-Reynolds	Boise State

Position	Player	Team
Second Team Offense
WR	Steven McBride	Hawaii
WR	Nick Nash	San Jose State
WR	Terrell Vaughn	Utah State
OL	Adam Karas	Air Force
OL	Kage Casey	Boise State
OL	Jacob Gardner	Colorado State
OL	Mose Vavao	Fresno State
OL	Cade Bennett	San Diego State
TE	Mark Redman	San Diego State
QB	Jayden Maiava	UNLV
RB	Emmanuel Michel	Air Force
RB	Jacory Croskey-Merritt	New Mexico
KR	Terrell Vaughn	Utah State
PK	Jonah Dalmas	Boise State
Second Team Defense
DL	Jalen Dixon	UNLV
DL	Devo Bridges	Fresno State
DL	Soane Toia	San Jose State
DL	Jordan Bertagnole	Wyoming
LB	Alec Mock	Air Force
LB	Andrew Simpson	Boise State
LB	Chase Wilson	Colorado State
LB	Levelle Bailey	Fresno State
DB	Carlton Johnson	Fresno State
DB	Morice Norris Jr.	Fresno State
DB	Noah Tumblin	San Diego State
DB	Cameron Oliver	UNLV
PR	Tory Horton	Colorado State
P	Jack Browning	San Diego State

=== National awards ===
- Jim Thorpe Award: Trey Taylor, Air Force

=== All-Americans ===
Currently, the NCAA compiles consensus all-America teams in the sports of Division I-FBS football and Division I men's basketball using a point system computed from All-America teams named by coaches associations or media sources. The system consists of three points for a first-team honor, two points for second-team honor, and one point for third-team honor. Honorable mention and fourth team or lower recognitions are not accorded any points. College Football All-American consensus teams are compiled by position and the player accumulating the most points at each position is named first team consensus all-American. Currently, the NCAA recognizes All-Americans selected by the AP, AFCA, FWAA, TSN, and the WCFF to determine Consensus and Unanimous All-Americans. Any player named to the First Team by all five of the NCAA-recognized selectors is deemed a Unanimous All-American.

Position	Player	School	Selector	Unanimous	Consensus
First Team All-Americans
S	Trey Taylor	Air Force	AFCA		
K	Jose Pizano	UNLV	FWAA		
AP	Ashton Jeanty	Boise State	ESPN, USAT		

Position	Player	School	Selector	Unanimous	Consensus
Second Team All-Americans
TE	Dallin Holker	Colorado State	AFCA, AP, FWAA, SI, TSN, USAT, WCFF		
DE	Mohamed Kamara	Colorado State	FWAA		
S	Trey Taylor	Air Force	FOX		
K	Jose Pizano	UNLV	AFCA, AP, FOX, SI, WCFF		
P	James Ferguson-Reynolds	Boise State	AFCA, FOX, SI		
KR	Jacob De Jesus	UNLV	USAT		
AP	Ashton Jeanty	Boise State	AP, USAT		

Position	Player	School	Selector	Unanimous	Consensus
Third Team All-Americans
WR	Ricky White III	UNLV	AP		
S	Trey Taylor	Air Force	AP		
P	James Ferguson-Reynolds	Boise State	AP		

== Home game attendance ==
Team	Stadium	Capacity	Game 1	Game 2	Game 3	Game 4	Game 5	Game 6	Game 7	Total	Average	% of Capacity
Air Force	Falcon Stadium	46,692	30,142 †	18,400	24,869	28,311	52,401	23,574		177,697	29,616	63.43%
Boise State	Albertsons Stadium	36,387	36,447	35,610	**37,491** †	35,189	34,076	36,390		215,203	35,867	98.57%
Colorado State	Canvas Stadium	41,000	31,497	27,932	34,901 †	22,570	22,033	20,121		159,054	26,509	64.66%
Fresno State	Valley Children's Stadium	41,031	**41,031** †	38,728	39,246	41,031	41,031	38,569		239,636	39,939	97.34%
Hawaii	Clarence T. C. Ching Athletics Complex	15,194	13,739 †	9,485	10,254	10,039	11,486	12,742	11,013	78,758	11,251	74.05%
Nevada	Mackay Stadium	27,000	19,852	16,890	24,578 †	13,083	15,540	12,044		101,987	16,998	62.95%
New Mexico	University Stadium	39,224	17,279	27,414 †	13,027	13,723	12,353	12,094		95,890	15,982	40.74%
San Diego State	Snapdragon Stadium	35,000	23,867	22,345	32,017 †	23,374	27,122	23,096	22,000	173,821	24,832	70.95%
San Jose State	CEFCU Stadium	21,520	20,337 †	14,224	16,124	15,028	18,886	16,224		100,823	16,804	78.08%
UNLV	Allegiant Stadium	65,000	20,347	22,582	25,328 †	22,585	25,568	25,554		141,964	23,661	36.40%
Utah State	Maverik Stadium	25,100	20,034 †	19,994	22,864	17,220	17,760	17,821		115,693	19,282	76.82%
Wyoming	War Memorial Stadium	30,181	26,450†	22,121	21,169	25,477	20,788	27,905	18,233	162,143	23,163	76.75%

Bold – At or Exceeded capacity
†Season High

== NFL draft ==
The NFL draft was held at Campus Martius Park in Detroit. The following list includes all Mountain West players in the draft.

=== List of selections ===
Player	Position	School	Draft Round	Round Pick	Overall Pick	Team
Mohamed Kamara	DE	Colorado State	5	23	158	Miami Dolphins
Trey Taylor	S	Air Force	7	3	223	Las Vegas Raiders
