= Lone Star High School (Frisco, Texas) =

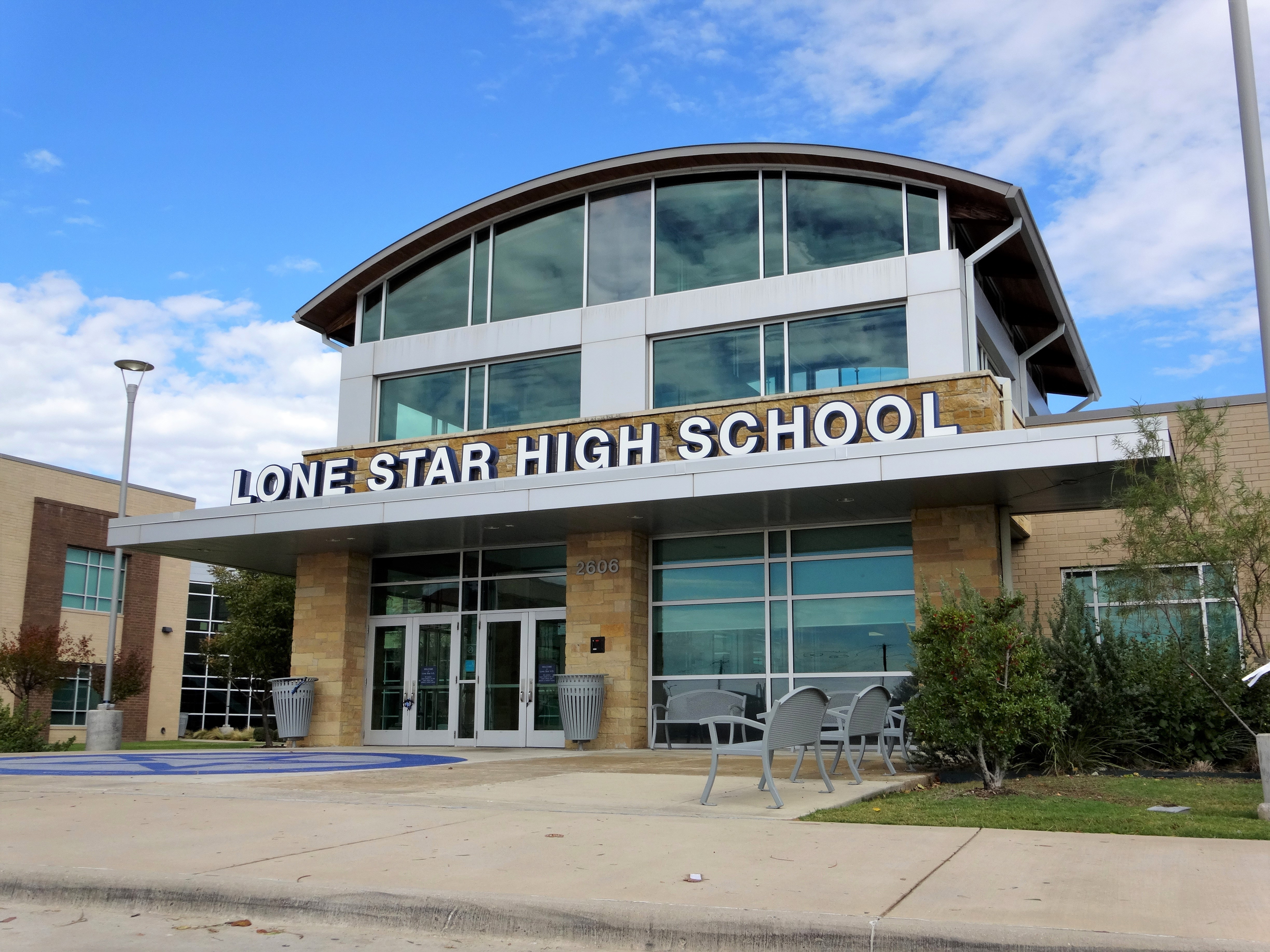

Location
- 2606 Panther Creek Parkway; Frisco, Texas 75033; United States; 33.1910°N 96.8663°W

Information
- School type: Public high school
- Motto: One Mission One Nation
- Established: 2010
- School district: Frisco Independent School District
- Principal: Keith Tolleson
- Staff: 128.75 (FTE)
- Grades: 9-12
- Enrollment: 1,953 (2023-2024)
- Student to teacher ratio: 15.17
- Colors: Navy blue & silver
- Athletics conference: UIL Class AAAAA (5A)
- Mascot: Ranger
- Rivals: Wakeland High School, Reedy High School, and Memorial High School
- Newspaper: Ranger News Network
- Website: www.friscoisd.org/o/lshs

Lone Star High School is a public high school located in the city of Frisco, Texas, United States, and classified as a 5A school by the UIL. It is a part of the Frisco Independent School District. In 2015, the school was rated as "Met Standard" by the Texas Education Agency.

== History ==
The campus opened in the fall of 2009 as an annex for students from Wakeland High School. In the fall of 2010, it formally opened with its own attendance zone. It is one of twelve high schools in Frisco ISD. In 2012, the official enrollment from 9th-12th grade was 952. Naming of the school draws from Texas' nickname as the "Lone Star State". The school mascot and sports teams are the Rangers.

On December 12 and 13, 2021, Lone Star High School cancelled school after a student brought a BB gun to school and made bomb threats against the school on social media. The matter was handled swiftly by the Frisco Police Department but led to panic among students at Lone Star and nearby schools.

On February 21, 2025, a burst pipe led to the flooding of one of Lone Star High School's academic halls. At first, students were rushed outside by fire alarms. Once students started going back into the school, the affected hall was blocked off and students with classes in the area were relocated into the school's gymnasium. The following days and weeks many teachers had to use other classrooms and areas of the school to teach, though after a few weeks all teachers were returned to their classrooms.

== Athletics ==
The Lone Star Rangers compete in the following sports:

- Baseball
- Basketball
- Cross country
- Football
- Golf
- Powerlifting
- Soccer
- Softball
- Swimming and diving
- Tennis
- Track and field
- Volleyball
- Wrestling

=== State titles ===
- Girls Track
  - 2013(3A)

Men’s soccer (2023)

== Notable alumni ==
Notable alumni of Lone Star High School include:

- Nick Bolton, American football player and Super Bowl winner for the Kansas City Chiefs
- Jesus Ferreira, MLS player for the Seattle Sounders
- Jaylan Ford, NFL linebacker for the New Orleans Saints; played college football for the Texas Longhorns (Class of 2020)
- Ashton Jeanty, NFL running back for the Las Vegas Raiders; played college football for the Boise State Broncos
- Marvin Mims, NFL player for the Denver Broncos
- Garret Rangel, quarterback for the Oklahoma State Cowboys
- Trey Taylor, NFL safety for the Las Vegas Raiders; played as a defensive back for the Air Force Falcons
- P. J. Washington, basketball player for the Dallas Mavericks
