= Ashton Jeanty =

American football player (born 2003)

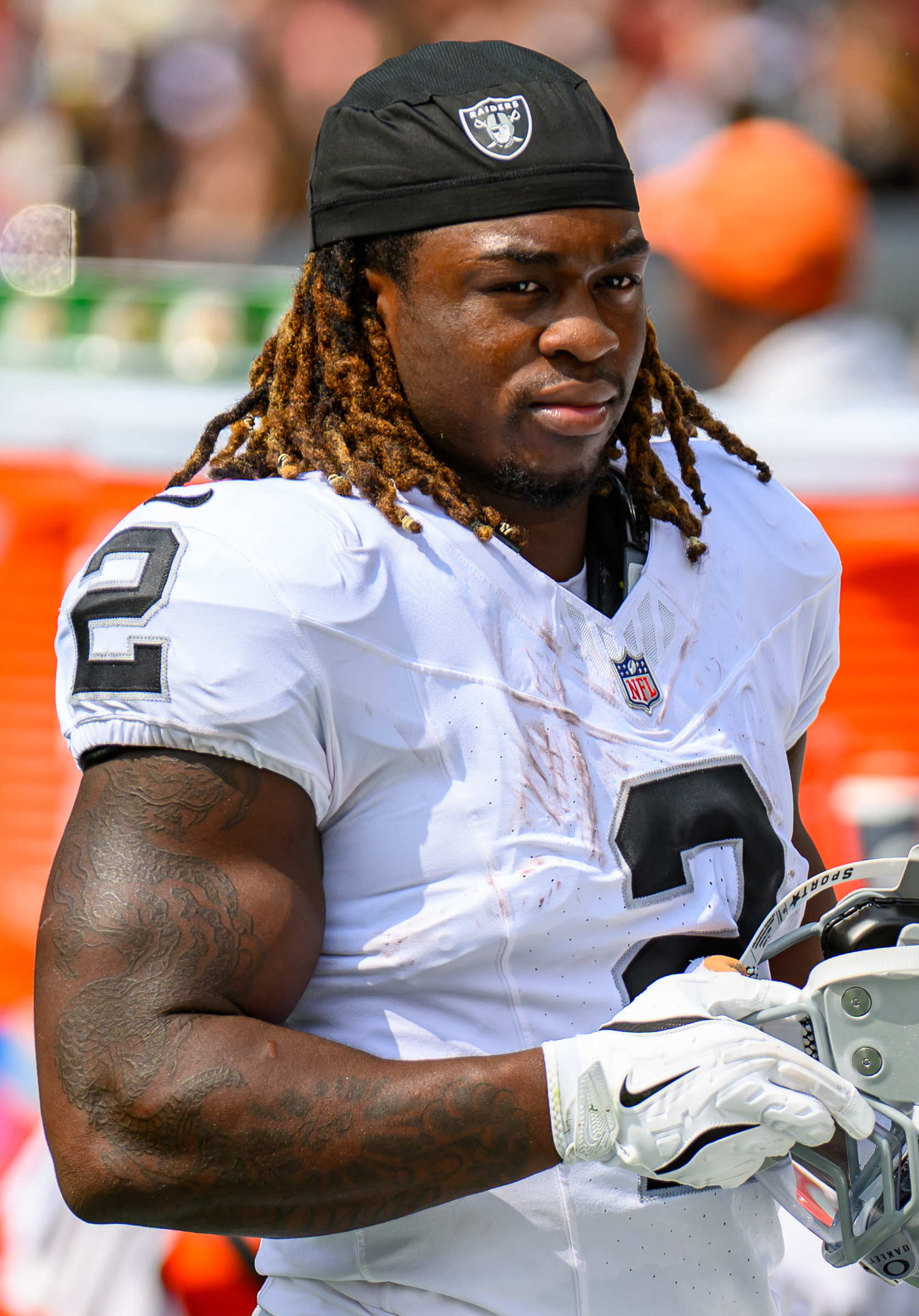
- Jeanty with the Las Vegas Raiders in 2025

No. 2 – Las Vegas Raiders
- Position: Running back
- Roster status: Active

Personal information
- Born: December 2, 2003 (age 22); Jacksonville, Florida, U.S.
- Listed height: 5 ft 8 in (1.73 m)
- Listed weight: 208 lb (94 kg)

Career information
- High school: Lone Star (Frisco, Texas)
- College: Boise State (2022–2024)
- NFL draft: 2025: 1st round, 6th overall pick

Career history
- Las Vegas Raiders (2025–present)

Awards and highlights
- PFWA All-Rookie Team (2025); Maxwell Award (2024); Doak Walker Award (2024); Earl Campbell Tyler Rose Award (2024); Unanimous All-American (2024); First-team All-American (2023) (Note: Selected as all-purpose / return specialist); NCAA rushing yards leader (2024); MW Male Athlete of the Year (2025); 2× MW Offensive Player of the Year (2023, 2024); 2× First-team All-MW (2023, 2024)

Career NFL statistics as of Week 10, 2026
- Rushing yards: 1,355
- Rushing average: 3.5
- Rushing touchdown: 6
- Receptions: 101
- Receiving yards: 763
- Receiving touchdowns: 8
- Stats at Pro Football Reference

Ashton Jeanty (/ˈdʒɛnti/ JEN-tee; born December 2, 2003) is an American professional football running back for the Las Vegas Raiders of the National Football League (NFL). An All-American playing college football for the Boise State Broncos, he won the Maxwell and Doak Walker Awards and was the Heisman Trophy runner-up in 2024 after leading the Football Bowl Subdivision (FBS) in rushing yards and touchdowns. Jeanty was selected by the Raiders sixth overall in the 2025 NFL draft.

== Early life ==
Jeanty was born on December 2, 2003, in Jacksonville, Florida. The son of Harry Jeanty, a U.S. Navy chief petty officer. He first played football at Great Bridge Middle School in Chesapeake, Virginia. As a high school freshman at Naples Middle/High School, a school for military dependents near Naples, Italy, he was initially placed at quarterback before being moved to running back after two games. Playing against teams from other base schools throughout Europe, Jeanty ran for over 1,200 yards and scored 21 touchdowns in the team's six-game season.

After that season, Jeanty told his parents that he wanted to return to the U.S. to play high school football. He eventually attended Lone Star High School in Frisco, Texas, where he rushed for 1,843 yards with 41 total touchdowns as a senior. He committed to Boise State University to play college football.

College recruiting
Name	Hometown	School	Height	Weight	40^{‡}	Commit date
Ashton Jeanty; RB	Jacksonville, Florida, U.S.	Lone Star (Frisco, Texas)	5 ft 9 in (1.75 m)	215 lb (98 kg)	4.42	Sep 13, 2021
Ashton Jeanty; RB	Recruit ratings: Rivals: 247Sports: ESPN: (74)					
Overall recruit ranking: 247Sports: 27 (RB) ESPN: 91 (RB)
‡ Refers to 40-yard dash; Note: In many cases, Scout, Rivals, 247Sports, On3, and ESPN may conflict in their listings of height, weight and 40 time.; In these cases, the average was taken. ESPN grades are on a 100-point scale.; Sources: "2021 Team Ranking". Rivals.com.

== College career ==
=== 2022 season ===
As a true freshman at Boise State in 2022, Jeanty split playing time with George Holani. He played in all 14 games with two starts and finished the year with 821 yards on 156 carries and seven touchdowns. In the 2022 Frisco Bowl, he rushed for 178 yards and a touchdown in the 35–32 victory over North Texas.

=== 2023 season ===
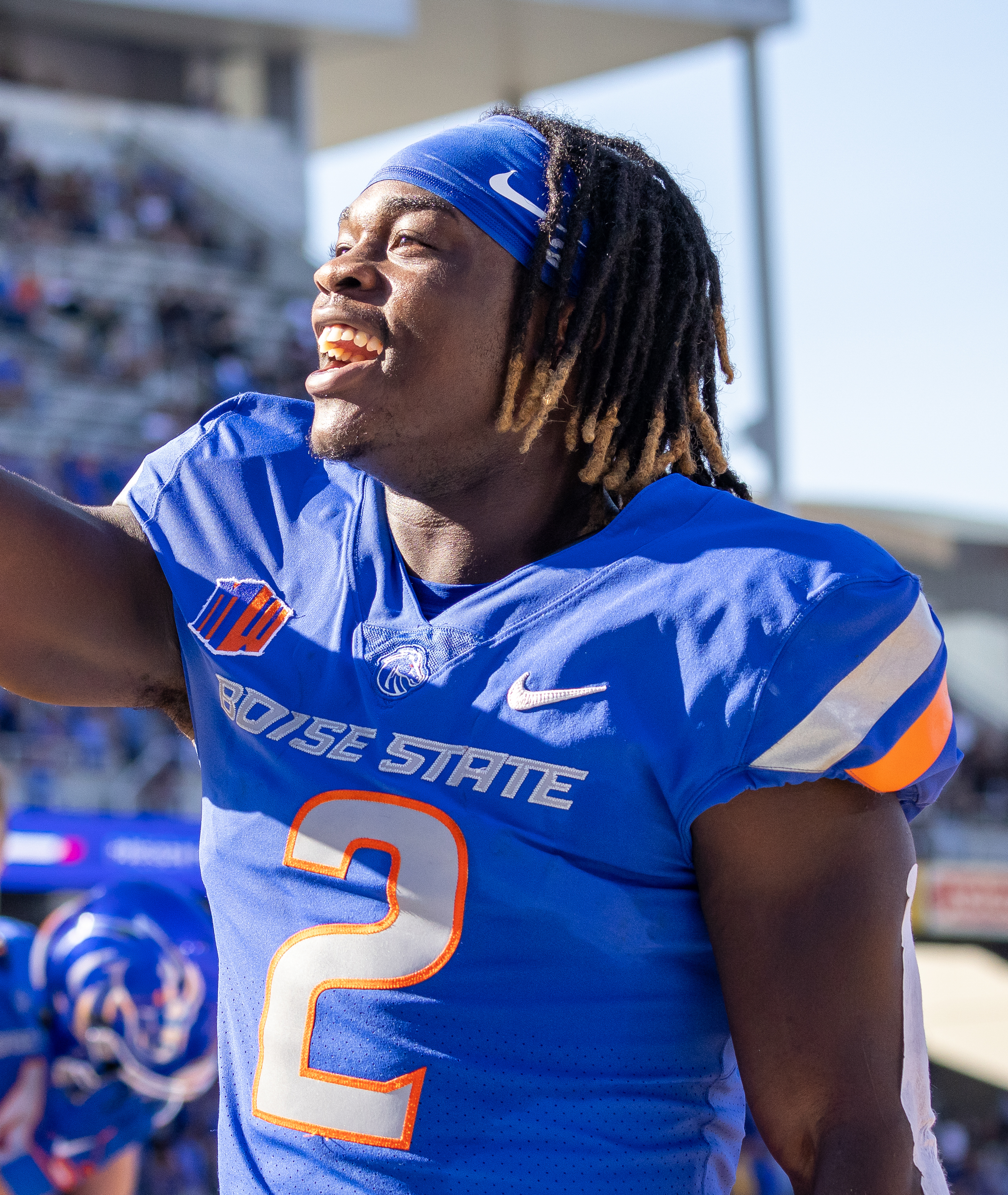
Jeanty with the Boise State Broncos in 2023

Jeanty returned to Boise State in 2023 and again shared duties with Holani. During that season, Jeanty led the team in rushing yards with 1,347 and 14 touchdowns. He also had 569 receiving yards, the second highest on the team and the most of any running back in the nation, and five receiving touchdowns. He was second in the nation in yards from scrimmage and was named the Mountain West Offensive Player of the Year.

=== 2024 season ===
In the 2024 season-opening game against Georgia Southern, Jeanty rushed for 267 yards, breaking a 46-year-old single-game record for Boise State, and six touchdowns, which tied the Paulson Stadium record and the Mountain West record. His rushing performance was the best of any FBS rusher during week 1. At the close of the 2024 regular season, Jeanty led the FBS in both yards from scrimmage and rushing yards. He rushed for over 100 yards in all 14 of the Broncos' games, including six games going over the 200-yard mark. He finished the season second in rushing touchdowns and total scoring. Jeanty was given first-team All-Mountain West honors, as well as being named the conference's Offensive Player of the Year. On August 7, 2025, Jeanty was selected as the Mountain West Male Athlete of the Year for the 2024–25 academic year.

Jeanty won the Maxwell Award, Doak Walker Award, Bobby Bowden Trophy, Earl Campbell Tyler Rose Award, was named a unanimous All-American by the Associated Press, and was runner-up for the Heisman Trophy. He declared for the NFL draft on January 7, 2025

== Professional career ==
Prior to the NFL draft, Jeanty declined participating in the NFL Scouting Combine beyond medical tests, opting to perform running back drills and partake in medical evaluations at Boise State's pro-day. A week leading up to the draft, Jeanty wrote a public letter to NFL general managers as to why they should draft him. In the letter, he wrote: "It's TACKLE football ... you know what I'm saying? I'd draft the guy they can't tackle."

Pre-draft measurables
Height	Weight	Arm length	Hand span	Wingspan
5 ft 8 1/2 in (1.74 m)	211 lb (96 kg)	29 1/4 in (0.74 m)	9 1/4 in (0.23 m)	6 ft 0 3/4 in (1.85 m)
All values from NFL Combine

Jeanty was selected with the sixth pick in the 2025 NFL draft by the Las Vegas Raiders. On May 8, 2025, Jeanty signed a four-year contract with the Raiders.

=== 2025 season ===
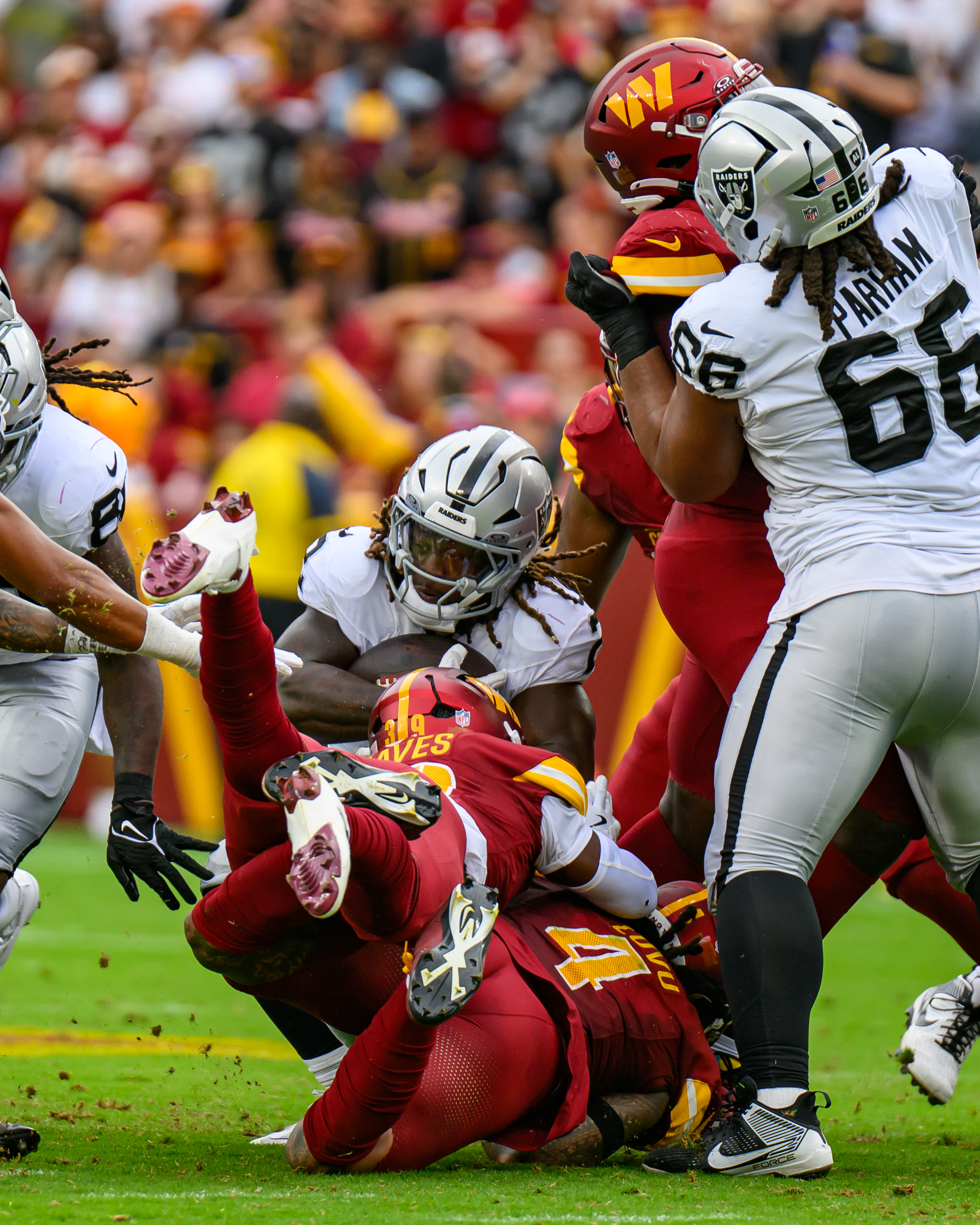
Jeanty (middle) being tackled while playing against the Washington Commanders

In his NFL debut in Week 1 against the New England Patriots, Jeanty ran for 19 times, totaling 38 yards, scoring his first professional touchdown on a 3-yard rush. In Week 3 against the Washington Commanders, Jeanty recorded 17 carries for 63 rushing yards.

In Week 4 against the Chicago Bears, Jeanty had a career high in single-game touchdowns, scoring three. Two were on passes from quarterback Geno Smith, accompanied by a 60-yard rushing touchdown. In the game, Jeanty compiled a total of 138 rushing yards on 21 carries and 17 receiving yards on 2 receptions, being named FedEx Ground NFL Player of the Week for his performance. In Week 6 against the Tennessee Titans, Jeanty recorded 23 carries for 75 yards and a touchdown.

In Week 16 on the road against the Houston Texans, Jeanty had a notable performance, recording 188 total yards and two touchdowns, one a 60-yard catch, and the other a 51-yard run. Despite this, the Raiders lost narrowly, 23-21, against the NFL's top ranked defense that season.

Jeanty finished his rookie season with 1,321 total scrimmage yards and 10 touchdowns as he was named to the PFWA NFL All-Rookie Team for the 2025 season.

== Career statistics ==
=== NFL ===
Year	Team	Games		Rushing					Receiving					Fumbles	
Year	Team	GP	GS	Att	Yds	Avg	Lng	TD	Rec	Yds	Avg	Lng	TD	Fum	Lost
2025	LV	17	17	266	975	3.7	64	5	55	346	6.3	60	5	2	1
2026	LV	10	10	123	380	3.1	19	1	46	417	9.1	45	3	0	0
Career		27	27	389	1,355	3.5	79	5	101	763	7.6	60	8	2	1

=== College ===
Legend
	Led NCAA Division I FBS
**Bold**	Career high

Year	Team	Games		Rushing				Receiving			
Year	Team	GP	GS	Att	Yards	Avg	TD	Rec	Yards	Avg	TD
2022	Boise State	**14**	2	156	821	5.3	7	14	155	11.1	0
2023	Boise State	12	10	220	1,347	6.1	14	**43**	**569**	**13.2**	**5**
2024	Boise State	**14**	**14**	**374**	**2,601**	**7.0**	**29**	23	138	6.0	1
Career		40	26	750	4,769	6.4	50	80	862	10.8	6

== Personal life ==
Jeanty is a Christian. He is of Haitian descent, with his dad being from the island and his mom being a second generation Haitian-American-French. Jeanty holds both Haitian and French citizenship from his parents.
