= John Michael Gyllenborg =

American football player (born 2002)

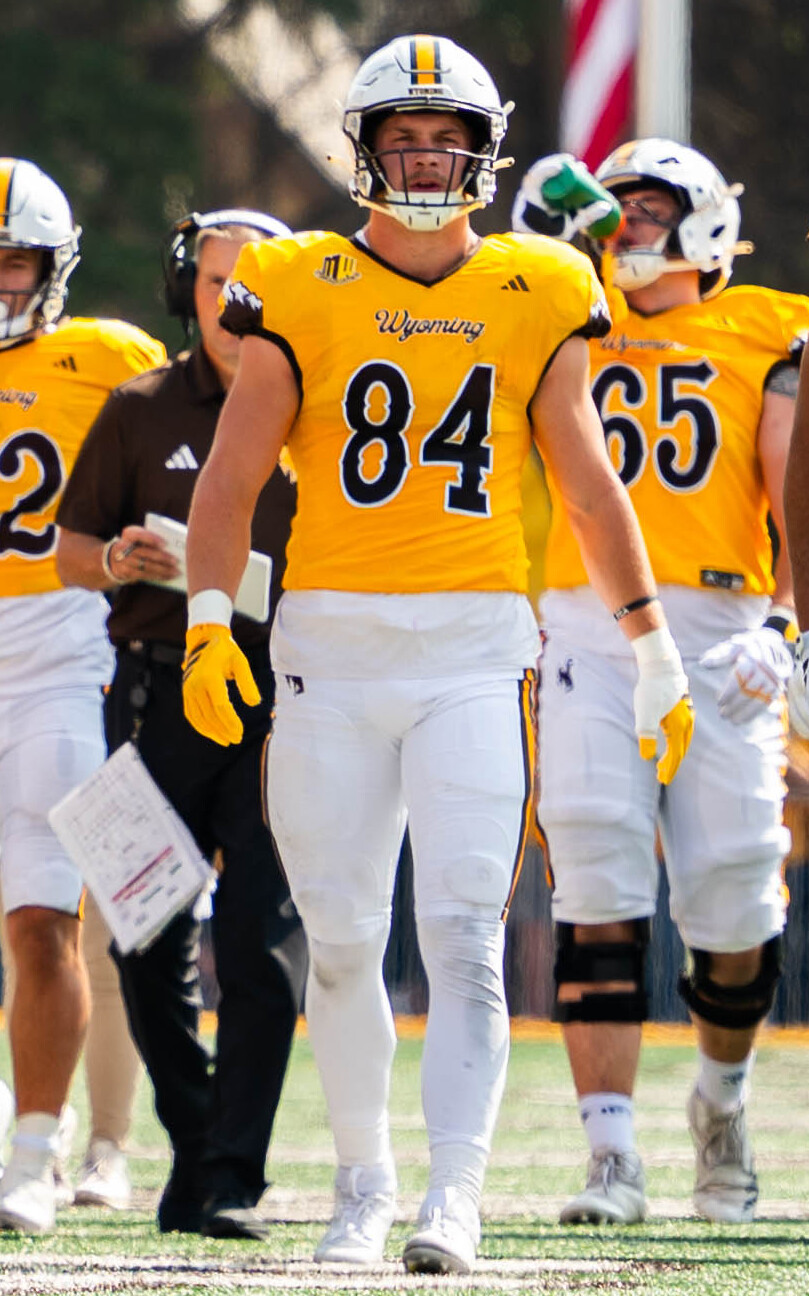
- Gyllenborg with Wyoming in 2025

No. 84 – Kansas City Chiefs
- Position: Tight end
- Roster status: Injured reserve

Personal information
- Born: August 7, 2002 (age 24)
- Listed height: 6 ft 5 in (1.96 m)
- Listed weight: 251 lb (114 kg)

Career information
- High school: Rockhurst (Jackson County, Missouri)
- College: Wyoming (2021–2025)
- NFL draft: 2026: undrafted

Career history
- Kansas City Chiefs (2026–present)

Awards and highlights
- Second-team All-MW (2024)
- Stats at Pro Football Reference

John Michael Gyllenborg (born August 7, 2002) is an American professional football tight end for the Kansas City Chiefs of the National Football League (NFL). He played college football at Wyoming.

== Early life ==
Gyllenborg attended Rockhurst High School in Kansas City, Jackson County, Missouri. He played only three games of high school football before injury and the COVID-19 epidemic ended the 2020 season. He grew up in Leawood, Kansas with his parents, Scott and Christina Gyllenborg, and his three sisters - Grace, Caroline, and Catherine.

Coming out of high school, he was rated as a three-star recruit and committed to play college football for the Wyoming Cowboys.

== College career ==
Gyllenborg took a redshirt in 2021. In 2022, he appeared in twelve games on special teams for the Cowboys, and one game as tight end where he hauled in three receptions for 21 yards. In week one of the 2023 season, Gyllenborg caught the fourth down 11-yard touchdown pass in double-overtime to help the Cowboys to an upset win over Texas Tech. During the 2023 season, he had a breakout season, notching 23 receptions for 360 yards and three touchdowns. Gyllenborg entered the 2024 season as the Cowboys starting tight end. In the 2024 season, Gyllenborg had 31 receptions for 437 yards and three touchdowns. His longest reception was for 63 yards and a touchdown against San Jose State.

== Professional career ==
Pre-draft measurables
| Height | Weight | Arm length | Hand span | Wingspan | 40-yard dash | 10-yard split | 20-yard split | 20-yard shuttle | Vertical jump | Broad jump | Bench press |
|---|---|---|---|---|---|---|---|---|---|---|---|
| 6 ft 5 3/4 in (1.97 m) | 249 lb (113 kg) | 31 in (0.79 m) | 10 in (0.25 m) | 6 ft 4 1/4 in (1.94 m) | 4.60 s | 1.60 s | 2.65 s | 4.22 s | 35.5 in (0.90 m) | 10 ft 8 in (3.25 m) | 17 reps |
All values from NFL Combine/Pro Day

Gyllenborg signed with the Kansas City Chiefs as an undrafted free agent on May 1, 2026. He was placed on season-ending injured reserve on July 28, 2026 with a knee injury.
