= Trey Taylor =

American football player (born 2001)

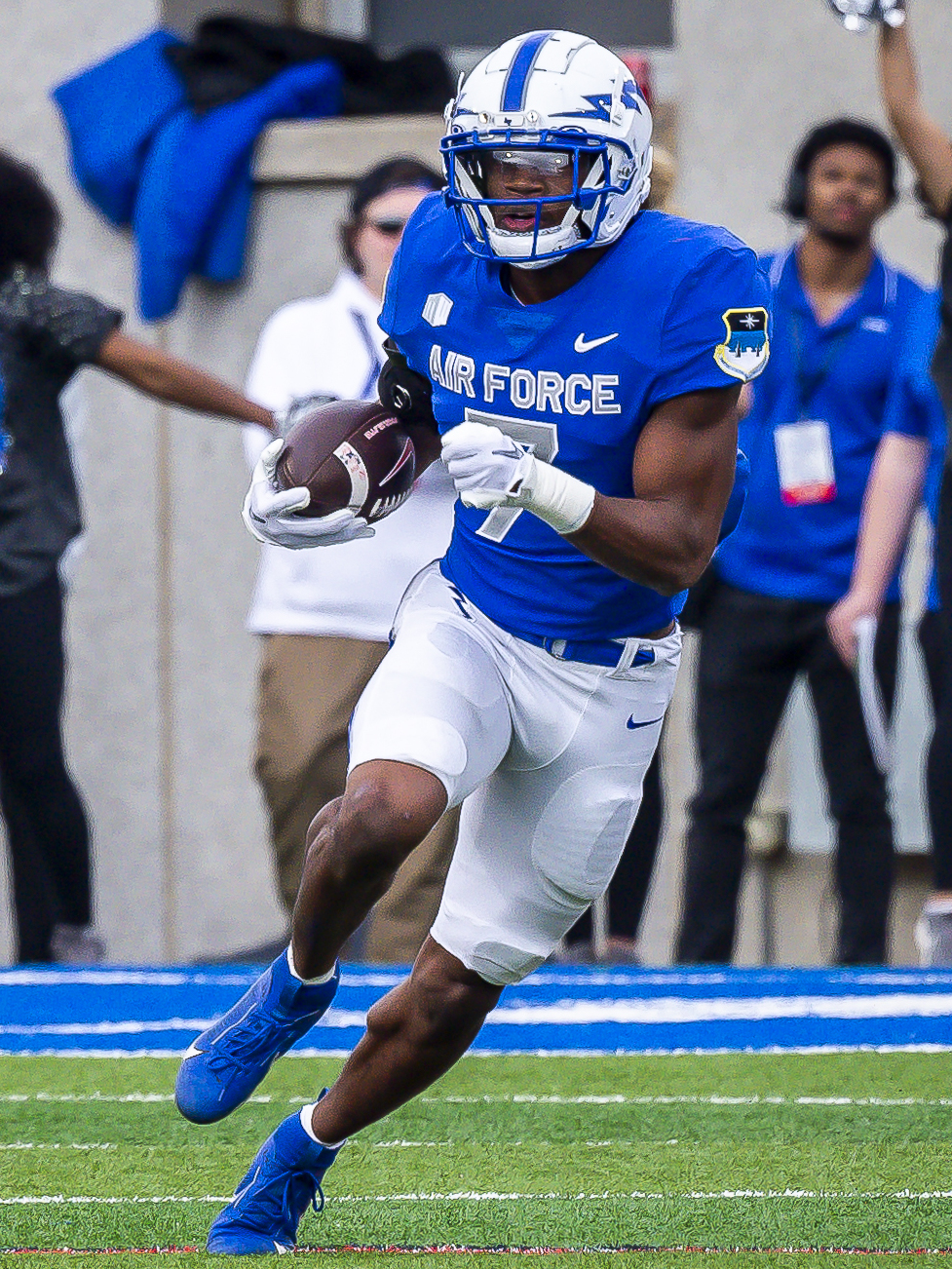
- Taylor with Air Force in 2023

Profile
- Position: Safety

Personal information
- Born: January 30, 2001 (age 25); Frisco, Texas, U.S.
- Listed height: 6 ft 0 in (1.83 m)
- Listed weight: 205 lb (93 kg)

Career information
- High school: Lone Star (Frisco)
- College: Air Force (2019–2023)
- NFL draft: 2024: 7th round, 223rd overall pick

Career history
- Las Vegas Raiders (2024–2025)

Awards and highlights
- Jim Thorpe Award (2023); First-team All-American (2023); First-team All-MW (2023); Second-team All-MW (2022)

Career NFL statistics as of 2025
- Games played: 9
- Stats at Pro Football Reference

Trey Taylor (born January 30, 2001) is an American professional football safety. He played college football for the Air Force Falcons, where he won the Jim Thorpe Award in 2023.

== Early life ==
Taylor grew up in Frisco, Texas and attended Lone Star High School where he lettered in football and track & field. Taylor would decide to commit to play college football for the Air Force Falcons.

== College career ==
In Taylor's first two seasons in 2019 and 2020, he did not appear in any games. In the 2021 season, Taylor would notch 62 tackles with 1.5 being for a loss, a sack, five pass deflections, an interception, and a forced fumble. In the 2022 season, Taylor would total 69 tackles with 4.5 going for a loss, a sack, four pass deflections, and two interceptions. In week seven of the 2023 season, Taylor notched ten tackles with one being for a loss versus Wyoming. For his performance against Wyoming, Taylor was named the Mountain West Defensive Player of the Week. In week nine Taylor would put up ten tackles versus Colorado State. At the conclusion of the 2023 season, Taylor was named a finalist for the Jim Thorpe Award which is awarded to the nation's top defensive back. Taylor was awarded the Jim Thorpe Award on December 8. In late January 2024, Taylor received the Pat Tillman Award, given annually by organizers of the East–West Shrine Bowl.

== Professional career ==
Pre-draft measurables
Height	Weight	Arm length	Hand span	40-yard dash	10-yard split	20-yard split	20-yard shuttle	Three-cone drill	Vertical jump	Broad jump	Bench press
6 ft 0 1/2 in (1.84 m)	213 lb (97 kg)	32 1/8 in (0.82 m)	9 1/4 in (0.23 m)	4.53 s	1.59 s	2.63 s	4.12 s	6.90 s	37.5 in (0.95 m)	10 ft 3 in (3.12 m)	22 reps
All values from East–West Shrine Bowl/Pro Day

Taylor was selected by the Las Vegas Raiders in the seventh round (223rd overall) of the 2024 NFL draft. He was placed on injured reserve on August 27, 2024 to begin the season. He was activated on October 12.

On August 26, 2025, Taylor was waived by the Raiders as part of final roster cuts and re-signed to the practice squad the next day. He was waived from the practice squad on September 1.

== Personal life ==
Taylor is the cousin of NFL Pro Football Hall of Famer, Ed Reed by marriage.
