= Mohamed Kamara (American football) =

American football player (born 1999)

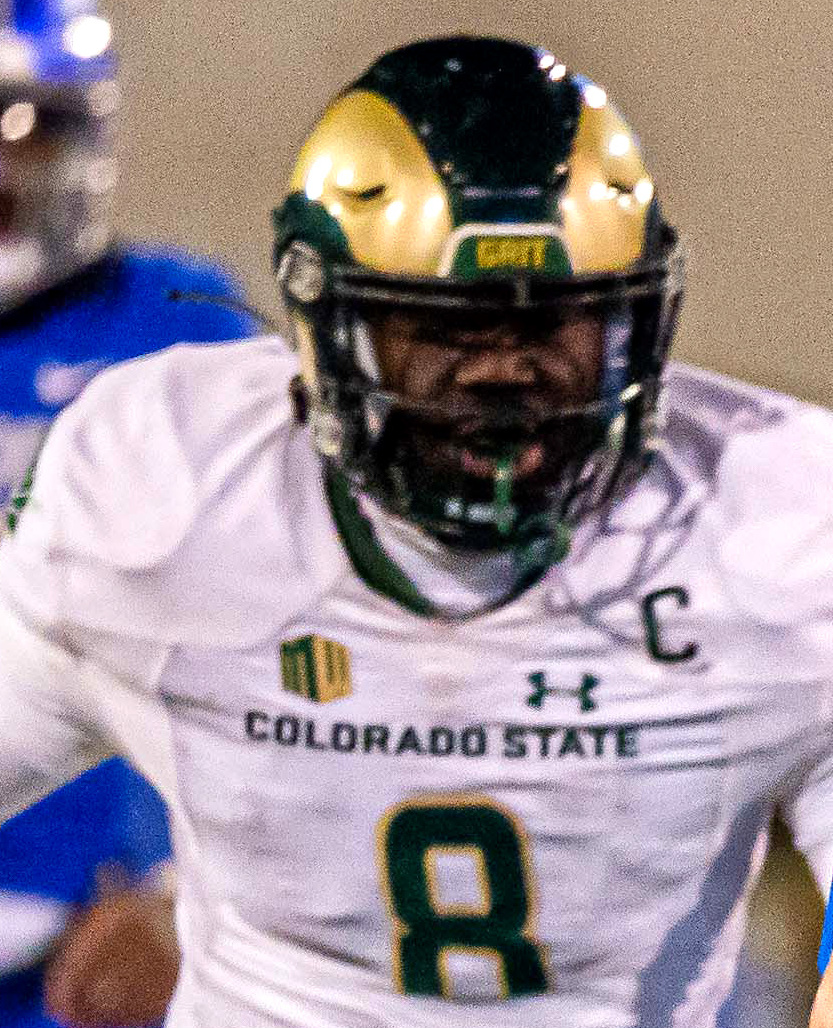
- Kamara with the Colorado State Rams in 2022

No. 59 – Tampa Bay Buccaneers
- Position: Outside linebacker
- Roster status: Injured reserve

Personal information
- Born: June 9, 2000 (age 26); Newark, New Jersey, U.S.
- Listed height: 6 ft 1 in (1.85 m)
- Listed weight: 253 lb (115 kg)

Career information
- High school: Central (Newark)
- College: Colorado State (2019–2023)
- NFL draft: 2024: 5th round, 158th overall pick

Career history
- Miami Dolphins (2024); Tampa Bay Buccaneers (2025–present)*
- * Offseason or practice squad member only

Awards and highlights
- MW Defensive Player of the Year (2023); First-team All-MW (2023); Second-team All-MW (2022)

Career NFL statistics as of 2024
- Total tackles: 1
- Stats at Pro Football Reference

Mohamed Kamara (born June 9, 2000) is an American professional football outside linebacker for the Tampa Bay Buccaneers of the National Football League (NFL). He played college football for the Colorado State Rams and was selected by the Dolphins in the fifth round of the 2024 NFL draft.

== Early life ==
Kamara grew up in Newark, New Jersey and attended Central High School. In his high school career, he made 21 total tackles (7 solo and 14 assists) as a sophomore and as a senior made 132 tackles including 11 sacks and six forced fumbles earning him on the second-team All-State from NJ.com. He was rated a three-star recruit and originally committed to play college football at Temple where his brother Amara had played, but instead signed to play for Colorado State due to coaching changes at Temple.

== College career ==
During Kamara's true freshman season in 2019, he played in nine games and finished the season with 11 solo tackles, 11 assisted tackles, 22 total tackles, 1.5 tackles for loss, a touchdown and a fumble recovery. During the 2020 season, he played in four games and started three of them. He finished the season with 7 solo tackles, 14 assisted tackles, 21 total tackles, 1.5 tackles for loss and 1.5 sacks. During the 2021 season, he played in all 12 games and started in three of them. He finished the season with 22 solo tackles, 14 assisted tackles, 36 total tackles, 9.5 tackles for loss for 41 yards, 7.5 sacks, a defended pass and a forced fumble. During the 2022 season, he played in all 12 games and finished the season with 24 solo tackles, 20 assisted tackles, 44 total tackles, 16 tackles for loss for 66 yards, 8.5 sacks for 53 yards, two forced fumbles and a fumble recovery. During the 2023 season, he played in all 12 games and finished the season with 56 total tackles (29 solo and 27 assisted), 17.0 tackles for loss for 89 yards, 13.0 sacks for 81 yards, one defended pass, two forced fumbles and one fumble recovery. After the season, he was named on the first-team All-Mountain West and was named the Mountain West Defensive Player of the Year.

== Professional career ==
Pre-draft measurables
Height	Weight	Arm length	Hand span	Wingspan	40-yard dash	10-yard split	20-yard split	20-yard shuttle	Three-cone drill	Vertical jump	Broad jump	Bench press
6 ft 1 3/8 in (1.86 m)	248 lb (112 kg)	32 3/8 in (0.82 m)	8 5/8 in (0.22 m)	6 ft 6 1/2 in (1.99 m)	4.57 s	1.58 s	2.66 s	4.49 s	7.34 s	34.5 in (0.88 m)	10 ft 3 in (3.12 m)	23 reps
All values from NFL Combine/Pro Day

=== Miami Dolphins ===
Kamara was selected by the Miami Dolphins in the fifth round, 158th overall, of the 2024 NFL draft.

On August 26, 2025, Kamara was waived by the Dolphins as part of final roster cuts.

=== Tampa Bay Buccaneers ===
On August 27, 2025, Kamara signed with the Tampa Bay Buccaneers' practice squad. On January 8, 2026, he signed a reserve/futures contract with Tampa Bay.

On August 30, 2026, Kamara was waived/injured by the Buccaneers.

== Personal life ==
Kamara is the younger brother of former Temple linebacker, Amara Kamara.
