= Kage Casey =

American football player (born 2003)

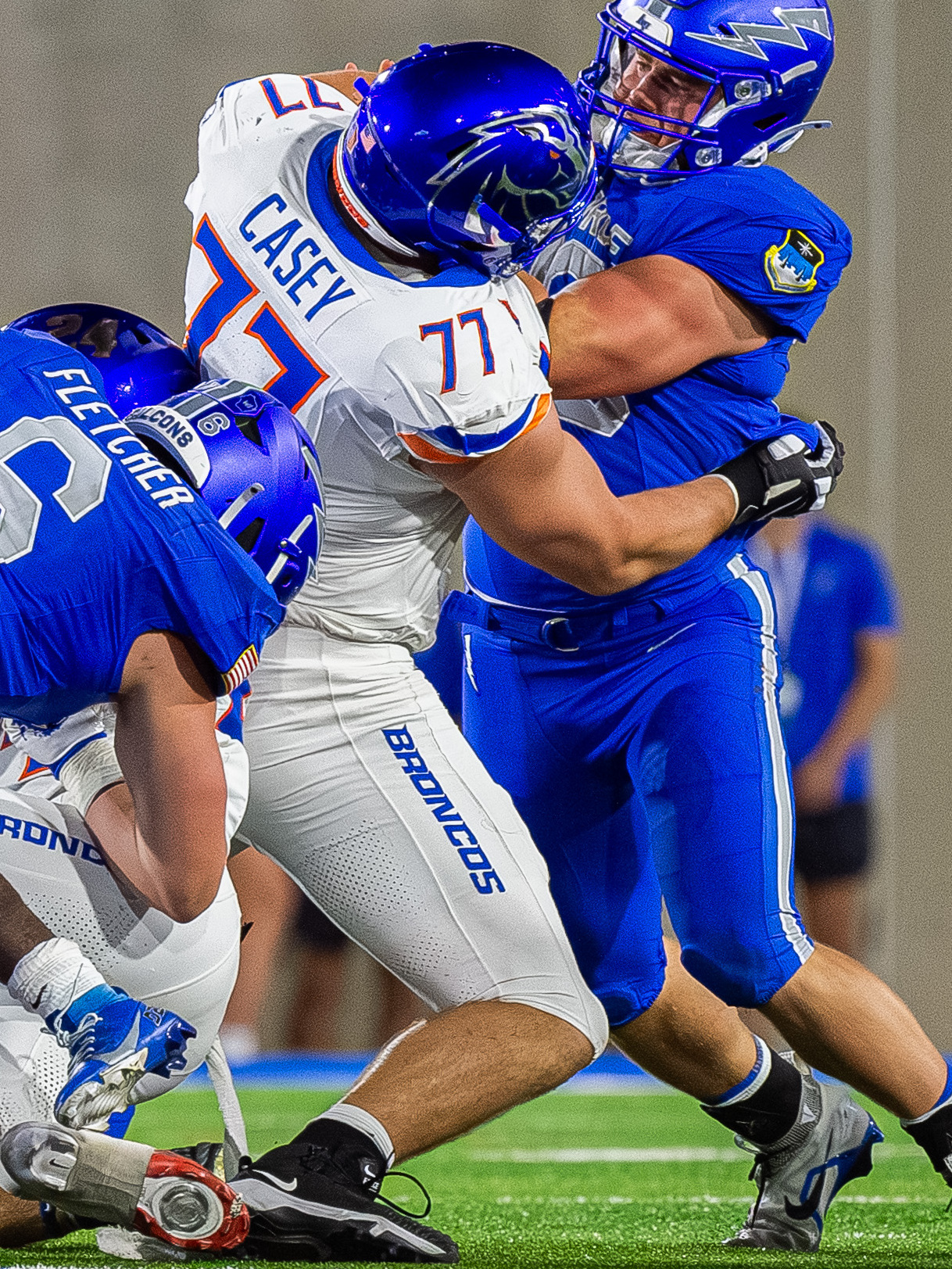
- Casey (left) with Boise State in 2025

No. 78 – Denver Broncos
- Position: Guard
- Roster status: Active

Personal information
- Born: December 10, 2003 (age 22); Salem, Oregon, U.S.
- Listed height: 6 ft 5 in (1.96 m)
- Listed weight: 310 lb (141 kg)

Career information
- High school: Clackamas (Happy Valley, Oregon)
- College: Boise State (2022–2025)
- NFL draft: 2026: 4th round, 111th overall pick

Career history
- Denver Broncos (2026–present)

Awards and highlights
- 2× First-team All-MW (2024, 2025); Second-team All-MW (2023)
- Stats at Pro Football Reference

Kage Casey (born December 10, 2003) is an American professional football guard for the Denver Broncos of the National Football League (NFL). He played college football for the Boise State Broncos and was selected by Denver in the fourth round of the 2026 NFL draft.

== Early life ==
Casey attended Clackamas High School in Happy Valley, Oregon, where he was a two-year starter at left tackle, while also playing defensive end. Coming out of high school, he was rated as a three-star recruit and committed to play college football for the Boise State Broncos.

== College career ==
As a freshman in 2022 he appeared in five games and took a redshirt. In 2023, he became a starter on the offensive line and started all 14 games for the Broncos, earning second-team all-Mountain West and second-team freshman All-American by the Athletic. In 2024, Casey started all 14 games for the Broncos and was named first-team all-Mountain West and second-team All-American by the Athletic and Walter Camp Foundation.

== Professional career ==
Pre-draft measurables
Height	Weight	Arm length	Hand span	Wingspan	40-yard dash	10-yard split	20-yard split	20-yard shuttle	Three-cone drill	Vertical jump	Broad jump	Bench press
6 ft 5 5/8 in (1.97 m)	310 lb (141 kg)	32 3/4 in (0.83 m)	10 1/4 in (0.26 m)	6 ft 8 7/8 in (2.05 m)	5.20 s	1.85 s	3.05 s	4.85 s	7.63 s	31.0 in (0.79 m)	8 ft 7 in (2.62 m)	20 reps
All values from NFL Combine/Pro Day

Casey was selected by the Denver Broncos in the fourth round (111th overall) of the 2026 NFL draft. On May 20, 2026, Casey signed his four-year rookie contract.

== Personal life ==
Casey met his wife Kiersten Van Kirk, a volleyball player at Boise State, where they eventually got married in 2023.
