= Ike Larsen =

American football player (born 2003)

Profile
- Position: Safety

Personal information
- Born: February 5, 2003 (age 23)
- Listed height: 5 ft 10 in (1.78 m)
- Listed weight: 200 lb (91 kg)

Career information
- High school: Sky View (Smithfield, Utah)
- College: Utah State (2021–2025)

Career history
- Calgary Stampeders (2026)

Awards and highlights
- First-team All-Mountain West (2023); Second-team All-Mountain West (2022)

Isaac "Ike" Larsen (born February 5, 2003) is an American professional football safety. He played college football for the Utah State Aggies.

== Early life ==
Larsen attended Sky View High School in Smithfield, Utah. He was rated as a three-star recruit and committed to play college football for the Utah State Aggies.

== College career ==
As a freshman in 2021, Larsen took a redshirt. In week zero of the 2022 season, he recorded his first career interception in a victory against UConn. In week one, Larsen notched an interception and a blocked punt in a loss to Alabama. On the season, he recorded 33 tackles with three going for a loss, two sacks, two pass deflections, four interceptions, and three blocked kicks. In 2023, Larsen started all 13 games, where he totaled 103 tackles, six pass deflections, four interceptions, and two blocked kicks. In week five of the 2023 season, Larsen tallied six tackles, a pass deflection, and the game-winning blocked extra point in a win against UConn, where for his performance he was named the Mountain West special teams player of the week. In week seven, he recorded a career-high two interceptions in a victory over Colorado State. For his performance during the 2023 season, Larsen was named first-team all-Mountain West. During the 2024 season, he recorded 80 tackles with one and a half being for a loss, nine pass deflections, and an interception. For his performance during the 2024 season, Larsen was named the 2024 Comeback Player Of The Year, after previously struggling with mental health issues.

== Professional career ==
Pre-draft measurables
Height	Weight	Arm length	Hand span	Wingspan	40-yard dash	10-yard split	20-yard split	20-yard shuttle	Three-cone drill	Vertical jump	Broad jump
5 ft 10 3/8 in (1.79 m)	198 lb (90 kg)	32 1/2 in (0.83 m)	9 1/8 in (0.23 m)	6 ft 4 7/8 in (1.95 m)	4.58 s	1.58 s	2.62 s	4.21 s	6.81 s	37.0 in (0.94 m)	10 ft 1 in (3.07 m)
All values from Pro Day

On May 1, 2026, Larsen signed with the Calgary Stampeders of the Canadian Football League (CFL). On September 4, he was released.
