= Tiger Shanks =

Canadian gridiron football player (born 2002)

- Shanks with the Montreal Alouettes in 2026

No. 52 – Montreal Alouettes
- Position: Offensive lineman
- Roster status: Active
- CFL status: National

Personal information
- Born: February 8, 2002 (age 24); Vancouver, British Columbia, Canada
- Listed height: 6 ft 5 in (1.96 m)
- Listed weight: 325 lb (147 kg)

Career information
- High school: Lake Oswego (Lake Oswego, Oregon, U.S.)
- College: UNLV (2020–2024)
- CFL draft: 2025: 1st round, 5th overall pick

Career history
- Montreal Alouettes (2025–present)

Awards and highlights
- CFL East All-Star (2026); 2× First-team All-Mountain West (2023–2024)
- Stats at CFL.ca

Tiger King Shanks (born February 8, 2002) is a Canadian professional football offensive lineman for the Montreal Alouettes of the Canadian Football League (CFL).

== College career ==
Shanks played college football for the UNLV Rebels of the Mountain West Conference from 2020 to 2024.

== Professional career ==
Pre-draft measurables
Height	Weight
6 ft 4 3/4 in (1.95 m)	325 lb (147 kg)
Values from Pro Day

Shanks was ranked as the #6 overall prospected ahead of the 2025 CFL draft, where he was drafted in the 1st round (5th overall) by the Montreal Alouettes. He was later signed by the team on May 7, 2025.

== Personal life ==
Shanks was born to Kerry Yu and Hunter Shanks. He has one older sister, Maria.
