= Mose Vavao =

American football player (born 2001)

No. 51 – Orlando Storm
- Position: Center
- Roster status: Active

Personal information
- Born: November 5, 2001 (age 25); Newark, California, U.S.
- Listed height: 6 ft 2 in (1.88 m)
- Listed weight: 305 lb (138 kg)

Career information
- High school: St. Francis (Mountain View, California)
- College: Fresno State (2020–2024)
- NFL draft: 2025: undrafted

Career history
- Indianapolis Colts (2025)*; Orlando Storm (2026–present)
- * Offseason or practice squad member only

Awards and highlights
- Second-team All-Mountain West (2023)
- Stats at Pro Football Reference

Mose Vavao (born November 5, 2001) is an American professional football center for the Orlando Storm of the United Football League (UFL). He played college football for the Fresno State Bulldogs and was signed by the Indianapolis Colts of the National Football League (NFL) as an undrafted free agent in 2025.

== Early life ==
Vavao was born November 5, 2001, in Newark, California. Attending Saint Francis High School in Mountain View, he played offensive line and defensive line on the school's football team for three seasons, including the 2017 team that won a state championship. Vavao was a three-star college football recruit and committed to play for the Fresno State Bulldogs.

== College career ==
As a freshman in 2020, Vavao played in all six games and started in the final two at left guard. He started in all 13 games in 2021 – six games at left guard and seven at right guard. In 2022 he started all 14 games at right guard and was an honorable mention to the All-Mountain West team. He started all 13 games in 2023, again at right guard; he was the only guard in the conference to play at least 650 snaps without receiving a penalty and was named second-team All-Mountain West. Vavao changed from the guard position to center in 2024, starting in 12 games, serving as a team captain, and earning an All-Mountain West honorable mention.

== Professional career ==
Pre-draft measurables
Height	Weight	Arm length	Hand span	Wingspan	40-yard dash	10-yard split	20-yard split	20-yard shuttle	Three-cone drill	Vertical jump	Broad jump	Bench press
6 ft 2 1/4 in (1.89 m)	305 lb (138 kg)	31 3/4 in (0.81 m)	10 5/8 in (0.27 m)	6 ft 6 1/4 in (1.99 m)	5.16 s	1.76 s	2.96 s	4.75 s	7.58 s	29.0 in (0.74 m)	9 ft 3 in (2.82 m)	26 reps
All values from Pro Day

=== Indianapolis Colts ===
Vavao was scouted as both a center and guard before the 2025 NFL draft, and met with the San Francisco 49ers and Kansas City Chiefs. After going unselected in the draft, he was signed by the Indianapolis Colts as an undrafted free agent. The Colts waived Vavao during final roster cuts and signed him to the team's practice squad. He was released from the practice squad on September 9.

=== Orlando Storm ===
On January 14, 2026, Vavao was selected by the Orlando Storm in the 2026 UFL draft.

== Personal life ==
Vavao studied business administration at Fresno State University. His favorite athlete is Kobe Bryant. Vavao has three siblings. Vavao is of Polynesian ancestry.
