= Emerson High School (Texas) =

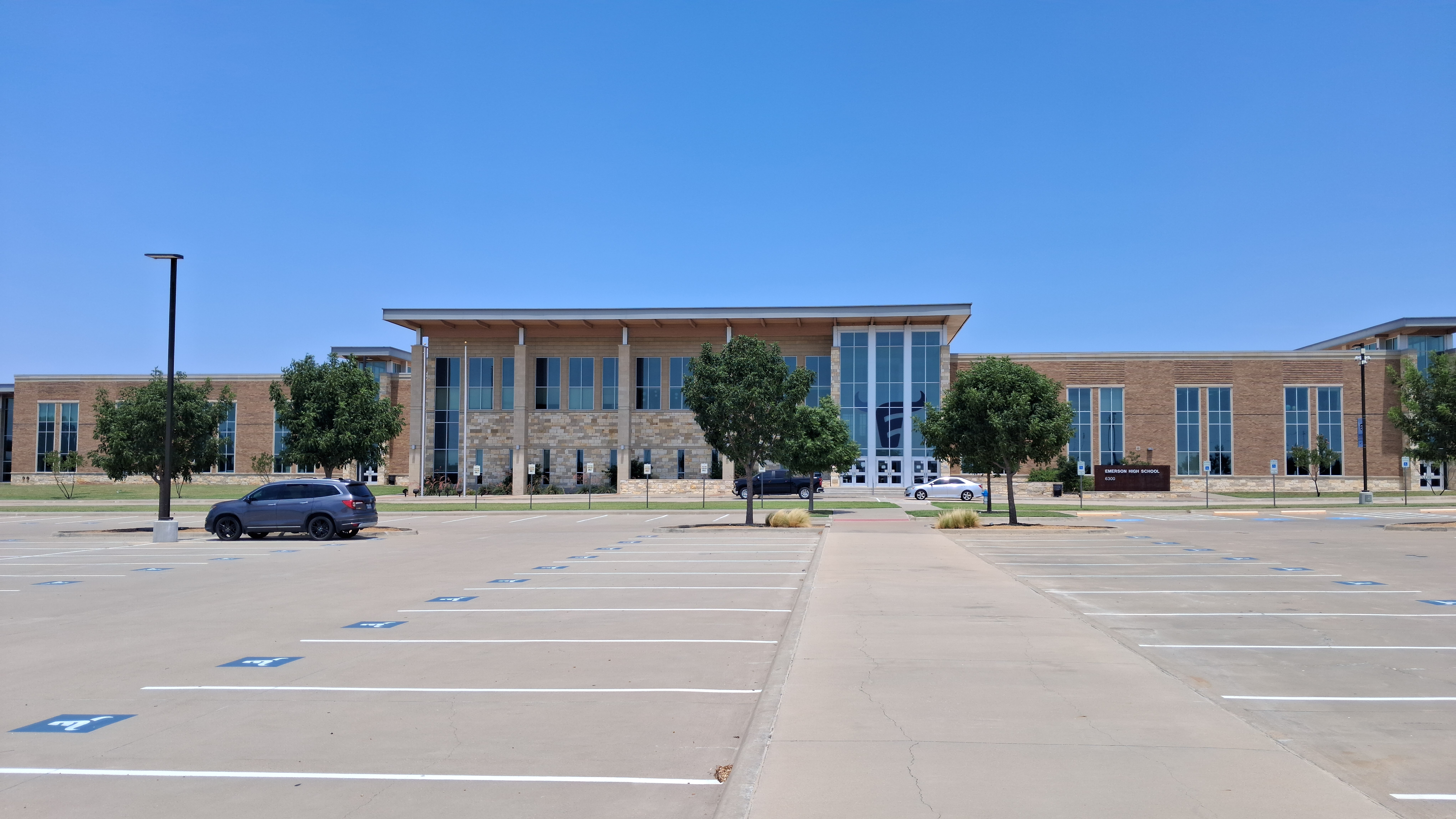

Location
- 6300 Collin McKinney Pkwy; McKinney, Collin County, Texas 75070; United States; 33.1466°N 96.69916°W

Information
- Type: Public High School
- Established: 2021
- School district: Frisco Independent School District
- NCES School ID: 482001013915
- Principal: Dr. Kristen Sommers
- Teaching staff: 119.40 (FTE)
- Grades: 9-12
- Enrollment: 1,763 (2023-2024)
- Student to teacher ratio: 14.77
- Campus type: Suburb
- Colors: Navy & Light blue
- Athletics conference: UIL 5A
- Mascot: Mavericks
- Newspaper: The Charge
- Yearbook: The Maverick
- Website: https://www.friscoisd.org/o/ehs

Emerson High School is a public high school located in McKinney, Texas. The school is under the jurisdiction of the Frisco Independent School District. The school serves the McKinney portion of Frisco ISD and competes at the UIL 5A level.

Construction on Emerson High School began in 2019 and finished in 2021 with the school graduating its first class in 2024. As of 2022, the school was given an overall grade of B by the TEA.

== History ==
Emerson High School is named after Francis Emerson, a banker from McKinney who in 1902 bought the land for the city of Frisco, Texas.

The construction of Emerson High School was announced by Frisco ISD in 2018, with construction work beginning in 2019 and finishing in 2021. The establishment of Emerson High School helped to relieve overcrowding in Liberty High School, Independence High School, and Centennial High School. The school graduated its first senior class in 2024 at The Star in Frisco.

== Demographics ==
As of the 2023-2024 school year, there are 1,763 students enrolled at Emerson High School with 119.40 full-time equivalent (FTE) teachers for a student-teacher ratio of 14.77. Around 19.4% of the school are eligible for free or reduced lunch. In term of demographics, Emerson High School student population is 32.33% Asian, 30.12% White, 16.51% African American, 14.52% Hispanic, 0.45% American Indian/Alaska Native, 0.11% Pacific Islander, and 5.96% Multiracial.

== Athletics ==
In 2023, Emerson High School managed to reach the UIL 5A D2 semifinals in football and played at the Ford Center at Frisco. The following year, they reached the Class 5A Division 2 Region 1 playoffs against Argyle High School playing against them at the Eagle Stadium in Argyle, Texas.

In their first year competing at the varsity level, the Emerson High School cross country and track and field teams qualified for their respective UIL state championships, marking a significant achievement for the school's athletic program.

Emerson High School competes in the following sports:

- Baseball
- Basketball
- Cross Country
- Football
- Golf
- Powerlifting
- Soccer
- Softball
- Swimming & Diving
- Tennis
- Track & Field
- Volleyball
- Wrestling

== Fine Arts ==
In 2023, Emerson High School participated in Broadway Dallas's 12th annual High School Musical Theater Awards in Dallas, Texas and was nominated for outstanding featured performer.

Emerson High School participates in the following fine arts:

- Band
- Choir
- Orchestra
- Theatre

== Notable alumni ==
- Michael Hawkins Jr. - quarterback for the Oklahoma Sooners
