= Memorial High School (Frisco, Texas) =

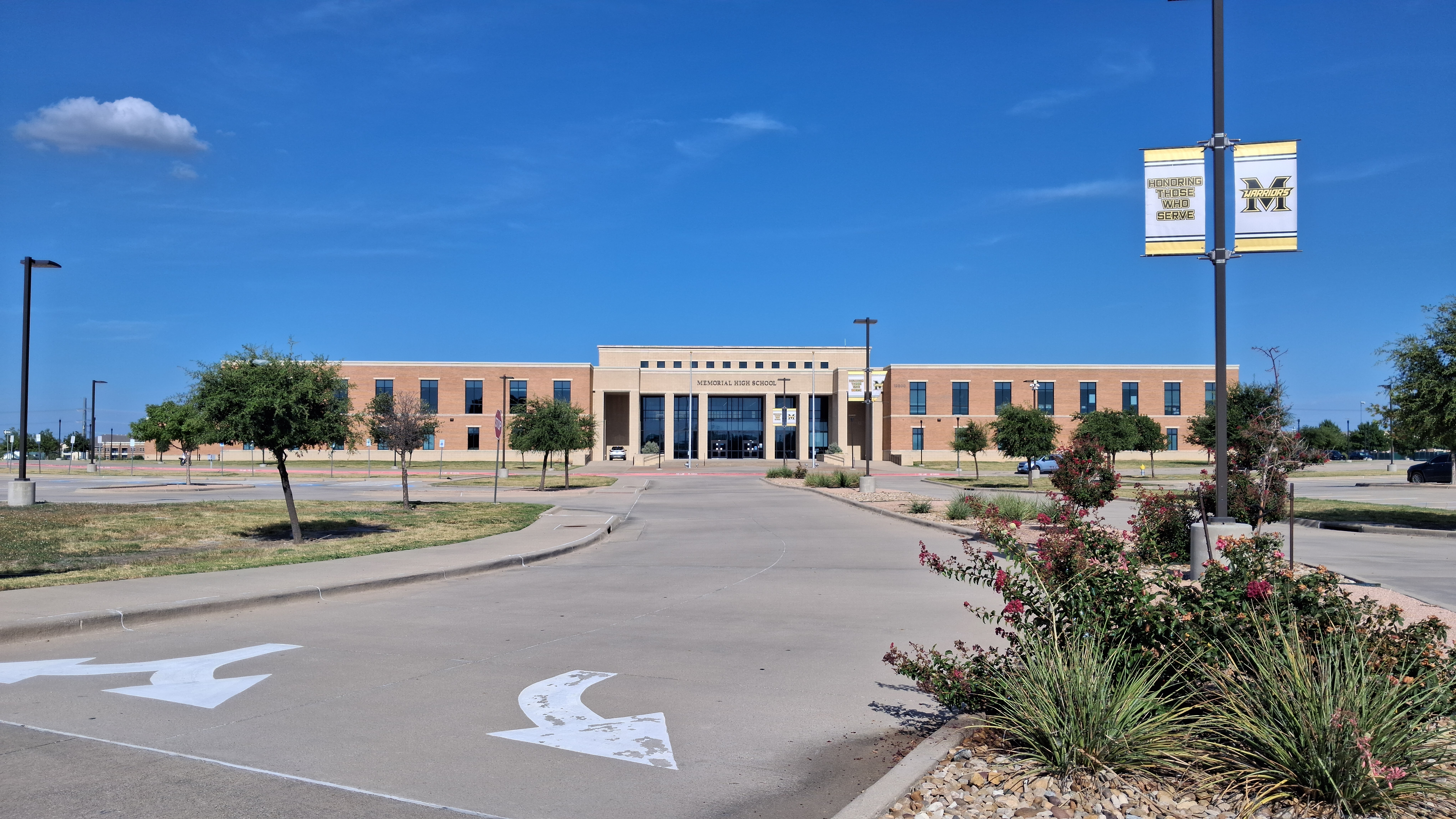

Location
- 12300 Frisco St; Frisco, Texas 75033; United States; 33.179909°N 96.829117°W

Information
- Type: Public high school
- Established: 2018
- School district: Frisco Independent School District
- Principal: Brook Fesco
- Teaching staff: 112.48 (FTE)
- Grades: 9–12
- Enrollment: 1,464 (2023–2024)
- Student to teacher ratio: 13.02
- Colors: Black and Gold
- Athletics conference: UIL Class 5A
- Mascot: Warriors
- Newspaper: The Warriors/Memorial Media
- Website: Memorial High School website

Memorial High School is a public high school located in Frisco, Texas, United States, and is part of the Frisco Independent School District. The school opened in the 2018–19 school year.

== History ==
Originally scheduled to open for the 2017–18 school year, Memorial High School's opening was delayed due to budget cuts, along with Lawler Middle School and Liscano and Talley elementary schools. Heritage, Lone Star, and Wakeland high schools were affected by crowding issues with larger classroom sizes, which were fixed with the opening of Memorial High School.

The Class of 2022 at Memorial High School had several members who conspired to create a devious prank that inflicted thousands of dollars of damage upon the school. A group of senior classmen got official approval for a sticky-note prank on the second-to-last day of school. They were supposed to place the sticky notes on the walls of the school during the morning, but instead overpowered the teachers and started spraying fire extinguishers in the school in addition to other damage-causing actions. This incident led to the cancellation of school for the last 2 days. Meanwhile, Memorial High School got a lot of local media coverage due to the incident.

On April 2, 2025, Frisco Memorial football player Austin Metcalf was stabbed to death at the University Interscholastic League District 11-5A track meet at Kuykendall Stadium after confronting and shoving Karmelo Anthony. Karmelo Anthony, a student from Frisco Centennial, was arrested by police and has been sentenced to 35 years for first-degree murder.

== Athletics ==
The Memorial Warriors participate in the following sports:

- Baseball
- Basketball
- Cross Country
- Football
- Golf
- Powerlifting
- Soccer
- Softball
- Swimming and Diving
- Tennis
- Track and Field
- Volleyball
- Wrestling
- Marching band
