= Reedy High School =

Rick Reedy High School

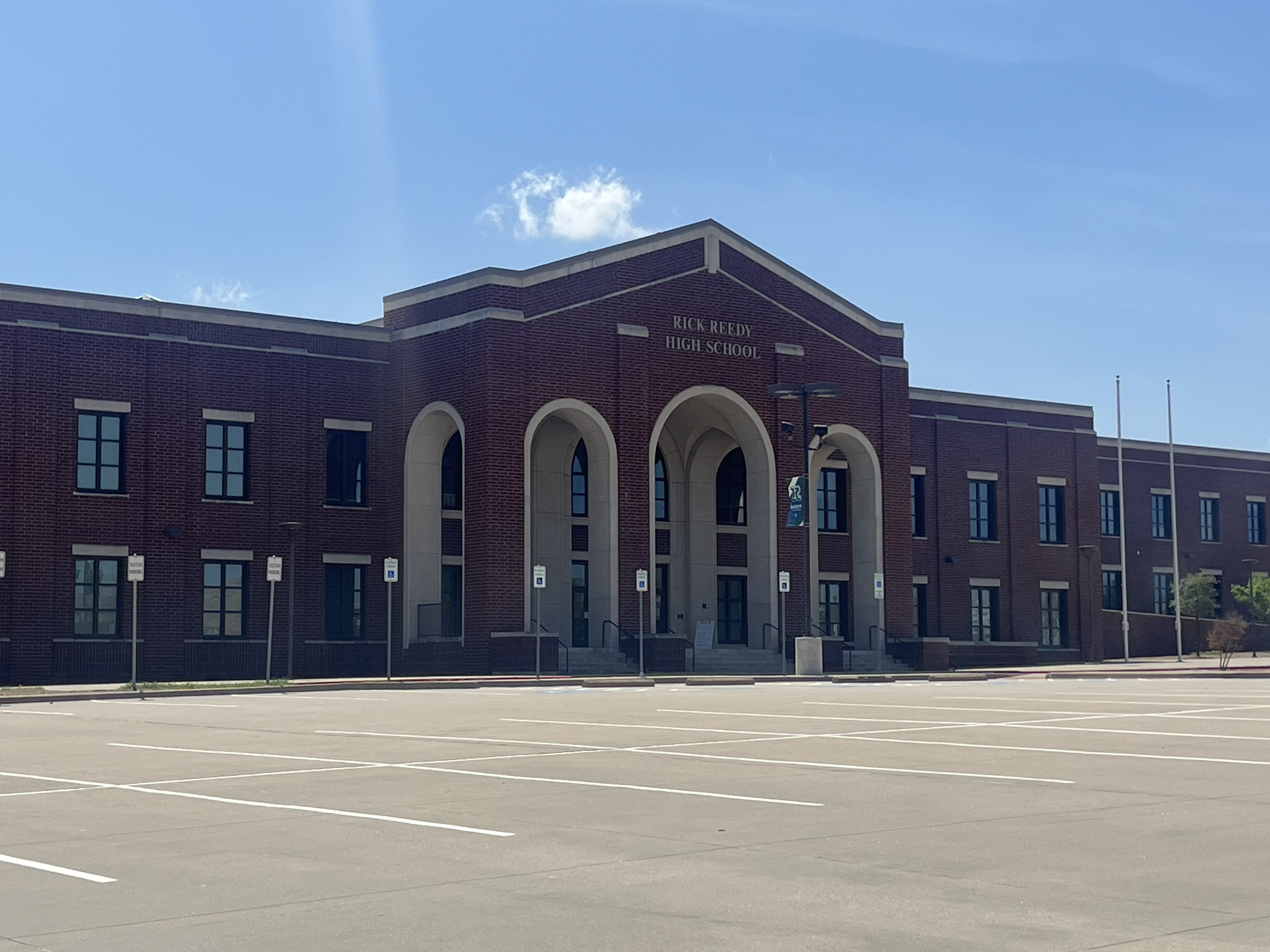

Location
- 3003 Stonebrook Parkway; Frisco, Texas 75036; United States; 33°7′56″N 96°51′53″W

Information
- School type: Public high school
- Mottoes: One Pride, Many Dreams; Roar Lions Roar
- Established: 2015
- School district: Frisco Independent School District
- Principal: Jon-Eric Ziaer
- Teaching staff: 135.81 (FTE)
- Grades: 9-12
- Enrollment: 2,191 (2023-2024)
- Student to teacher ratio: 16.13
- Colors: Green, Blue, and Silver
- Athletics conference: UIL Class 5A
- Mascot: Lions
- Rival: Wakeland and Frisco
- Newspaper: OPEN Den
- Website: Official Website

Rick Reedy High School is a four-year public high school located in Frisco, Texas. It is part of the Frisco Independent School District. It is one of twelve high schools in the district, and is named after Rick Reedy, who served as the district's superintendent for 16 years. The school was built to relieve the Frisco and Wakeland High Schools.

Reedy opened with 9th and 10th graders in the 2015–2016 school year. The first graduating class was the class of 2018.

== Athletics ==
Reedy High School competes in the following sports:

- Baseball
- Basketball
- Cross Country
- Football
- Golf
- Powerlifting
- Soccer
- Softball
- Swimming and Diving
- Tennis
- Track and Field
- Volleyball
- Wrestling

=== State Finalists ===
- Volleyball
  - 2022(5A)

=== State Quarterfinalists ===
- Football
  - 2018 (5A)
