= Frisco High School =

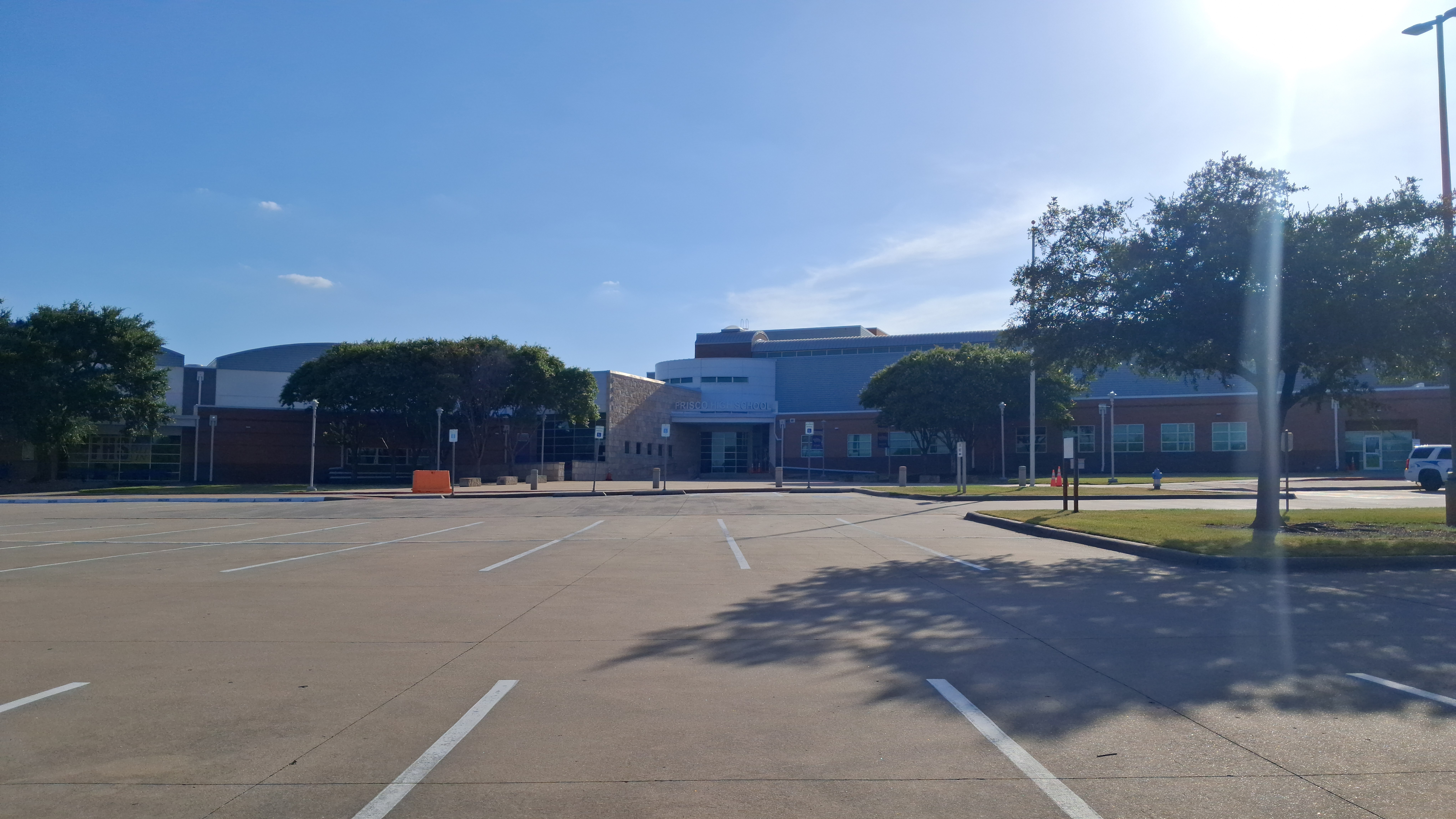

Location
- 6401 Parkwood Boulevard; Frisco, Texas 75034; United States; 33°07′54″N 96°49′19″W

Information
- School type: Public high school
- Motto: "THE Original"
- Founded: 1902
- School district: Frisco Independent School District
- Principal: Shawn Perry
- Teaching staff: 133.47 (FTE)
- Grades: 9-12
- Enrollment: 1,999 (2023-2024)
- Student to teacher ratio: 14.98
- Colors: Blue & Gold
- Athletics conference: UIL Class 5A D II (Region II District 9)
- Mascot: Raccoons
- Rival: Wakeland High School
- Newspaper: Raccoon Rambler
- Website: Frisco High School website

Frisco High School is a public high school located in Frisco, Texas and is a part of the Frisco Independent School District. For the 2021-2022 school year, the school received a rating of "A" from the Texas Education Agency.

== History ==
Frisco High School was founded in 1902. The original building no longer exists, but other previous locations still do: the Frisco ISD Student Opportunity Center (on Maple Street in "Center City" Frisco) was Frisco High School for many years; in fact, the words "Frisco High School" are still etched into the stone above the main entrance. In 1973, a new high school facility was built just north of this location and used for many years; this school building is now used as a middle school: Staley Middle School. Then, another new building, at Stonebrook Parkway and Parkwood Boulevard, was constructed in the 1990s; designed by architecture firm Corgan, it still serves as Frisco High School today.

The Frisco High School mascot was a raccoon, selected by the school district in 1924. According to historical accounts, a young resident named Royal Hill brought his pet raccoon to a school district meeting and suggested they use "Coons" as the new mascot.

At the beginning of the 2000s, Frisco's explosive population growth required the opening of a second high school named Centennial High School in east Frisco, at Coit Road and Rolater Road. Frisco ISD's third high school, Wakeland High School, opened in 2006 in northwest Frisco on Legacy Drive. This, like the opening of Centennial, also cut a large chunk out of Frisco High's attendance zone. The opening of now rival Wakeland High School, was vital, in that it relieved the infamous overcrowding at Frisco High; ever since Wakeland opened, FHS's total enrollment has always been below the building's capacity of 1800 students. However, the population of Frisco continued to grow; therefore, Rick Reedy High School opened in 2015, on Stonebrook Parkway just east of Teel Parkway, to relieve congestion at Frisco High. Reedy High School is Frisco ISD's eighth high school. The most recent attendance total for FHS is around 2,000 students, keeping the campus at its desired 5A Classification.

A significant addition and remodel to Frisco High School began during the summer of 2012, to increase the building's capacity to 2100 students and to update the school's facilities to the level of quality enjoyed by the other, newer high schools in the district. The project included the construction of a new auditorium, orchestra room, gymnasium, library, and parking lot, as well as an expansion of the cafeteria into the current auditorium. The previous marching band practice field was paved over to create the new parking lot, which was necessary because the new auditorium displaced a large number of the old parking spaces. The project was expected to be completed in the summer of 2013 but was finished later in 2013.

== School organizations ==
=== Athletics ===
Before 2002, the athletic team was known as the "Coons", but the name was changed to "Raccoons" that year. Superintendent Rick Reedy and board member Jimmy Gaffney supported the change, while some area residents opposed the change. The change meant the sole water tower was to be repainted at the time. Before the vote, the sole FISD athletic stadium at the time was changed from "Coons Stadium" to "FISD Memorial Stadium". In 2019 Coach Jeff Harbert led the Raccoons to Football District Champions.

The Frisco Raccoons compete in these sports

- Band
- Baseball
- Basketball
- Cross Country
- Football - 2019 District Champions
- Golf
- Powerlifting
- Soccer
- Softball
- Swimming and Diving
- Tennis
- Track and Field
- Volleyball
- Wrestling

=== State titles ===
- Girls Cross Country
  - 1982 (3A)
  - 1981-1984 Girls Track State Champions 2A
- Softball
  - 2002 (4A)
- Boys Swimming
  - 2005 (4A), 2006 (4A), 2008 (4A)
- Girls Swimming
  - 2011 (4A)
- Boys Track
  - 1981 (2A), 1982 (2A), 1983 (2A), 1984 (2A)

== Notable alumni ==
- Jack Anderson (born 1998), National Football League (NFL) guard for the Buffalo Bills
- Ben Bishop (born 1986), retired National Hockey League goaltender. Played for the St. Louis Blues, Ottawa Senators, Tampa Bay Lightning, Los Angeles Kings, and Dallas Stars.
- Nico Carvacho (born 1997), basketball power forward/center in the Israeli Basketball Premier League
- Dylan Horton (born 2000), NFL defensive end for the Houston Texans
- Cole Hutson (born 2004), college football offensive lineman for the Texas Longhorns
- Matt Lepsis (born1974), former NFL offensive tackle for the Denver Broncos and Super Bowl XXXIII winner
- Avi Nash, actor (The Walking Dead, Learning to Drive)
- Red Patterson (born1987), former Major League Baseball pitcher
- Ryan Vilade (born 1999), Major League Baseball utility player
