= LTHS =

LTHS or Lths may refer to:

- Lepanthes, a genus of orchids abbreviated by horticulturists as "Lths"

High Schools

- Lacey Township High School, Lacey Township, New Jersey, USA
- Lackawanna Trail High School, Factoryville, Pennsylvania, USA
- Lake Travis High School, unincorporated Travis County, Texas, USA
- Lockport Township High School, Lockport, Illinois, USA
- Lyons Township High School, La Grange, Illinois, USA
- Lebanon Trail High School, Frisco, Texas USA
