= Jake Lang =

American far-right activist (born 1995)

- Lang in 2026
- Born: Edward Jacob Lang; April 7, 1995 (age 31); Narrowsburg, New York, U.S.
- Occupation: Activist
- Known for: Participation in the January 6 United States Capitol attack
- Political party: Republican
- Movement: White supremacy; White nationalism; Counter-jihad; Anti-Hindu activism; Anti-Muslim activism; Antisemitism; Anti-Zionism
- Status: Released (pardoned)

Edward Jacob Lang (born April 7, 1995) is an American far-right activist and provocateur.

He participated in the 2021 January 6 United States Capitol attack and spent four years in prison awaiting trial on charges that included attacking police officers with a baseball bat. He was among the nearly 1,600 rioters pardoned by President Donald Trump in 2025.

Lang and his political activities have been identified as Islamophobic, antisemitic, white nationalist, and white supremacist.

== Early life ==
Edward Jacob Lang was born on April 7, 1995, in Narrowsburg, New York, to Ned Lang who runs a sludge-processing facility and Sari Lang. He has an older sister who served as a medic in the Israel Defense Forces. He graduated from Delaware Valley High School in Milford, Pennsylvania, in 2013 and attended Hunter College in Manhattan for one year before dropping out and starting a series of businesses. These included an e-commerce website, night club promoter, and social media adviser to models at the start of their careers.

== Antisemitism ==
Lang's father is of German and Irish descent, while his mother is of Ashkenazi Jewish descent with roots in Russia. Lang was raised as a Catholic and also celebrated Jewish traditions like Passover and Hanukkah. He was photographed as a child holding a bar mitzvah certificate in front of the Western Wall in Jerusalem. However, he has said that he renounced all ties to Judaism and Israel, and posted a video of himself burning a copy of the Talmud (as well as a Quran and a book that promotes Christian Zionism). Despite this, some far-right activists, including Nick Fuentes, have continued to denounce him for having Jewish heritage.

On January 4, 2026, Lang staged an antisemitic demonstration outside the Washington, D.C., headquarters of AIPAC, a pro-Israel lobby group. In the demonstration, he threw chocolate coins, gave a Nazi salute, and stated, "White people in America, you will be replaced, and your children will be Black Muslims if you don't stand up now" and "White Christian men are not gonna sit around while you turn our children into a bunch of nigger lovers".

== Militancy and political career ==
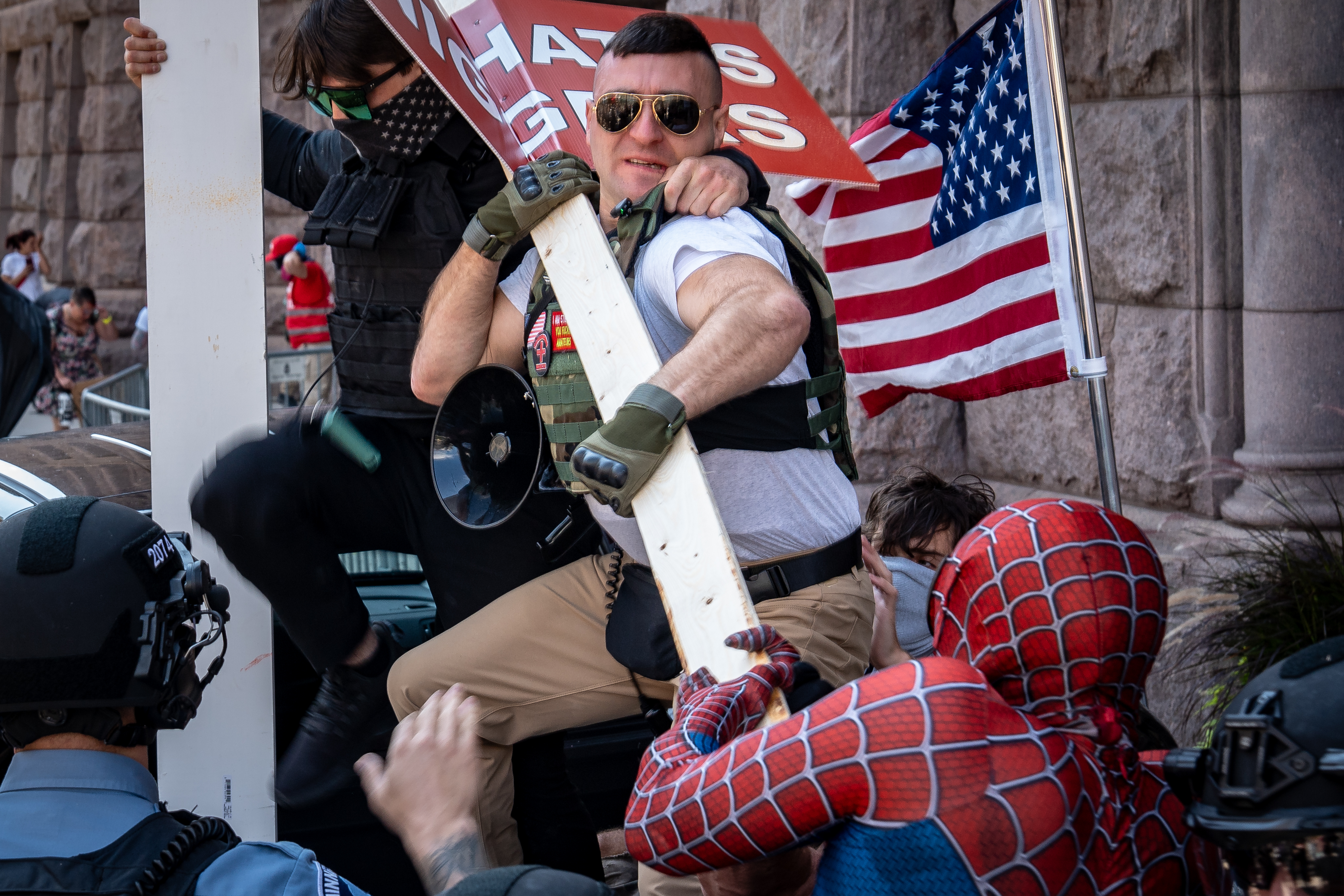
Lang in conflict with a protester dressed as Spider-Man in Minneapolis, August 22, 2026

=== January 2021 ===
Lang was arrested on January 16, 2021, after an 11-count indictment, including assault charges for attacking officers with a baseball bat. He pleaded not guilty to all charges. Lang spent four years in prison while his legal team successfully maneuvered to delay a trial. Lang told Newsweek that during his time in prison he spent hundreds of days in solitary confinement in response to the coronavirus lockdown and his continued political activities. He received a pardon, along with other alleged and convicted participants in the January 6 riot, on January 20, 2025, the first day of Trump's second term.

=== Candidacy for U.S. senator from Florida ===
Lang announced a run for U.S. Senate from Florida in the Republican primary held in August 2026. On October 22, 2025, he said that, as senator: "I would deputize the Proud Boys and the January 6 Patriots to bounty hunt illegal immigrants." Lang also stated his "very first act as a US Senator" would be "to ban Islam". By the end of 2025, Lang had raised a total of $4,397 for his campaign. His campaign was not considered serious. He failed to register as a candidate with the secretary of state of Florida and was not on the ballot for the 2026 primary election.

=== Minneapolis ===
On January 17, 2026, a week after Renée Good was killed by ICE Agent Jonathan Ross, Lang attempted to lead a "March Against Minnesota Fraud" in which he vowed to burn a Quran and march to Cedar-Riverside, a neighborhood with a large Somali-American population. He and his small group of supporters were surrounded by hundreds of counter-demonstrators. Lang was shielded by a local Black man and was able to escape. Bloodied, Lang was helped by two Black women by car at a red light. When they asked who he was, he refused to tell them or explain what was going on, only that Trump had saved his life. After a few blocks, they told Lang to get out. He gave them his number promising to pay for the damage to their car by counter-demonstrators but he never followed up. Lang abandoned his plans for the march and alleged he was stabbed and attacked by counter-protesters but never filed a police report.

Lang was later arrested after recording himself vandalizing a $6,000 anti-ICE ice sculpture at the Minnesota State Capitol. He was arrested and jailed on suspicion of criminal damage to property, a felony. He pleaded not guilty. The ice sculpture had been commissioned and installed by the veterans organization Common Defense. The trial is being presided over by Ramsey County District Judge Veena Iyer, whom Lang made sexist and racist comments about. Lang's trial was set for July 27; he could face a maximum sentence of five years in prison and $10,000 in fines. On April 8, prosecutors added a second-degree property damage charge related to bias against an individual or group. The next hearing is scheduled for October 9.

=== March 2026 ===
Lang organized an anti-Islam demonstration outside New York City Mayor Zohran Mamdani's official residence at Gracie Mansion on March 8, 2026. His "Stop the Islamic Takeover of New York City, Stop New York City Public Muslim Prayer" drew 20 people; as in Minneapolis, there were many more counter-protestors. Two counter-protestors from Pennsylvania were arrested by the New York Police Department after they threw two incendiary devices at the demonstration.

In March 2026, Lang was charged with a misdemeanor for threatening a Metropolitan Police officer at an event commemorating the fifth anniversary of the Capitol attack, telling the officer that he should be "put down like a dead dog" and hanged in front of the Capitol, as well as dragged "out by his ankles" and thrown "in the Potomac". Lang has pled not guilty, and has been given a stay-away order. He was issued a bench warrant for not making his scheduled March 24, 2026, preliminary hearing for the charge.

=== May 2026 ===
At a bond hearing for Dalton Eatherly, known online as "Chud the Builder", Lang was arrested and taken into custody after disrupting courtroom proceedings.

=== June 2026 ===
On June 2, 2026, Lang was arrested in Frisco, Texas, and charged with criminal trespass in April 2025 at David Kuykendall Stadium, site of the murder of Austin Metcalf. He was released June 3 on a $7,500 bond.

On June 9, Lang was arrested in Dallas County, Texas, for making a terroristic threat related to the same murder trial. Lang's bond was initially set at $1 million before being reduced to $250,000. He was released on bond on June 23 with a condition that he was barred from entering the State of Texas except for legal reasons.

=== August 2026 ===
On August 22, 2026, Lang was arrested in Minneapolis along with others after they drove onto a sidewalk where a crowd was gathered. He was released on August 27 after the Hennepin County Attorney's Office declined to pursue felony charges.

=== November 2026 ===
On November 8, 2026, Lang disrupted a Hindu Diwali event in Seattle, Washington, carrying a sign saying "Deport all dot heads".

On November 9, Lang spent several minutes yelling outside the entrance to a Seattle cat convention, which he had evidently mistaken for a furry convention. He left after "hurling anti-gay slurs at the staff members" and was subsequently "brutally mocked online", LGBTQ Nation reported.

== See also ==
- List of cases of the January 6 United States Capitol attack (G-L)
- Criminal proceedings in the January 6 United States Capitol attack
- List of people granted executive clemency in the second Trump presidency
- List of people pardoned or granted clemency by the president of the United States
