= Panther Creek High School (Frisco, Texas) =

Public school in Texas, United States

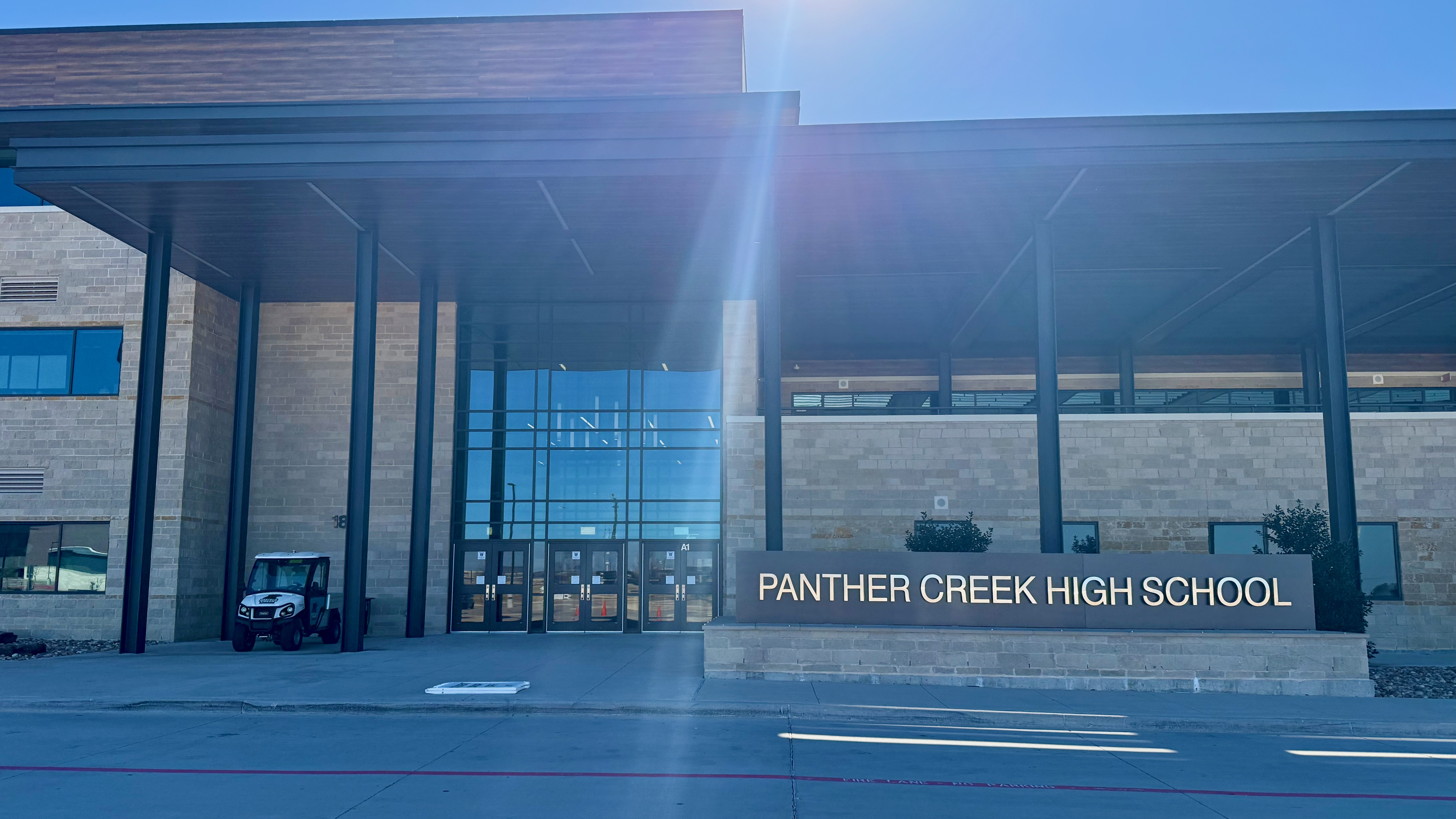

Location
- 1875 PGA Parkway; Frisco, Denton County, Texas 75033; United States; 33°12′51.17″N 96°51′47.77″W

Information
- School type: Public high school
- Established: 2022; 4 years ago
- School district: Frisco Independent School District
- NCES School ID: 482001014188
- Principal: Ryan Solano
- Teaching staff: 91.96 (FTE)
- Grades: 9–12
- Gender: Coeducational
- Enrollment: 1,166 (2023-24)
- Student to teacher ratio: 12.68
- Colors: Cyan & Black
- Athletics conference: UIL 4A
- Mascot: Panther
- Feeder schools: Lone Star High School; Memorial High School
- Website: School Website

Panther Creek High School is a public high school within northwest Frisco, Texas. It is a part of Frisco Independent School District and it is located in Denton County. Panther Creek opened in 2022 and it is Frisco Independent School District's 12th high school.

== History ==
Panther Creek completed construction in June 2022, opening fall of the same year. The school is named after the creek that is by the campus. Panther Creek High school receives students from Stafford, Wilkinson, and Trent Middle School, and also relieves Lone Star High School and Memorial High school from exceeding 2,100 students.

== Demographics ==
As of the 2023-2024 school year, there are a total of 1,166 students enrolled at Panther Creek High School. Of the students enrolled, 31.14% of students are Asian, 22.99% are African American, 26.59% are White, 13.39% are Hispanic, 0.77% are American Indian/Alaskan Native, 0.17% are Pacific Islanders, and 4.97% are Multiracial. 17.5% of students at Panther Creek High are eligible for free and reduced lunch.

== Athletics ==
Panther Creek Panthers competes in the following:

- Baseball
- Soccer
- Basketball
- Softball
- Swimming
- Golf
- Track and field
- Cross country
- Volleyball
- Football
- Wrestling
