= Clark Middle School =

Clark Middle School can refer to:

- Clark Middle School (Texas), a middle school in the United Independent School District of Laredo, Texas
- Clark Middle School (Texas), a middle school in the Frisco Independent School District
- Clark Middle School (California), a middle school in the San Diego Unified School District
