= Heritage High School (Frisco, Texas) =

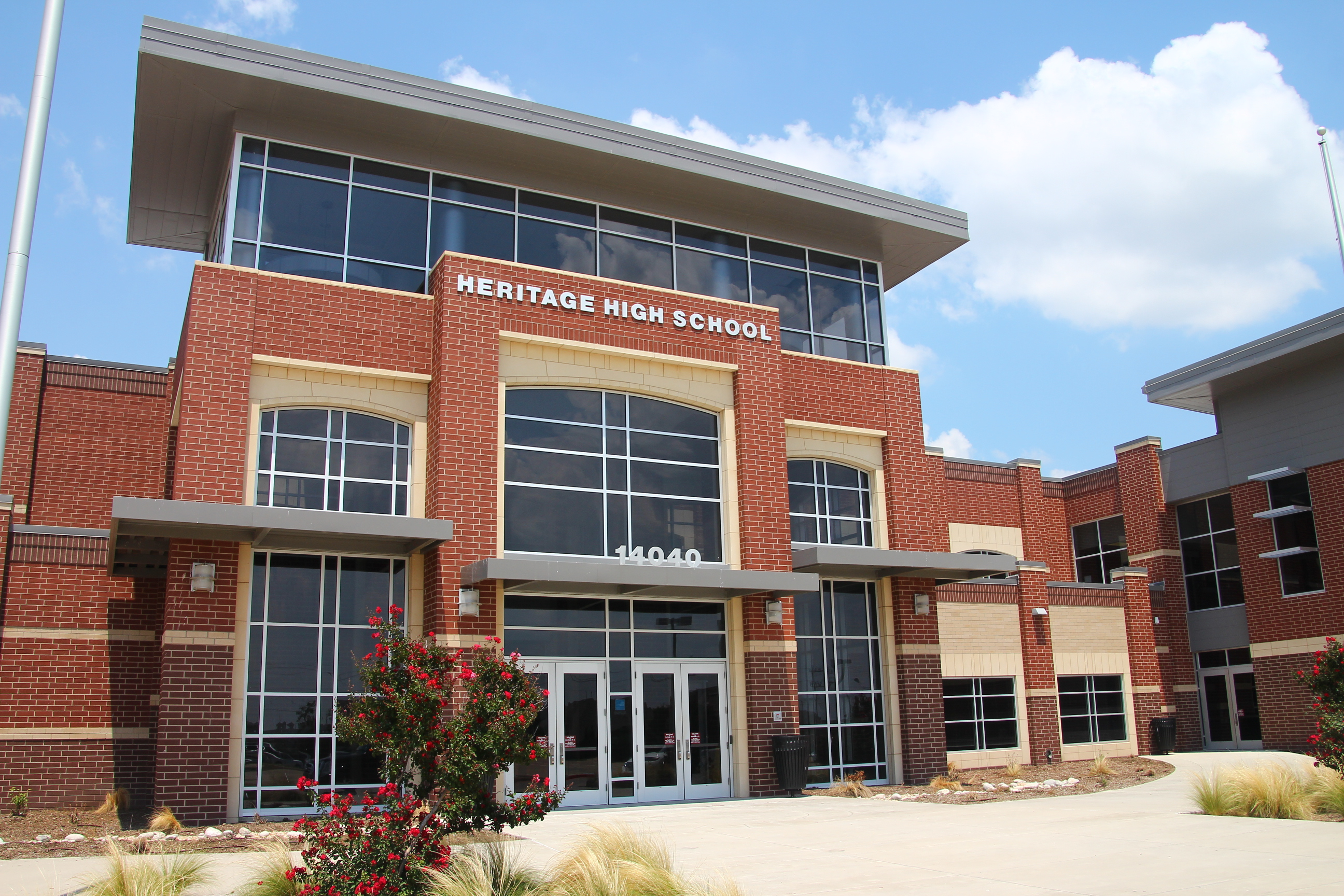

Location
- 14040 Eldorado Parkway; Frisco, Texas 75035; United States; 33.1754°N 96.7549°W

Information
- School type: Public high school
- Founded: 2009
- School district: Frisco Independent School District
- Principal: Melanie Lee
- Staff: 138.01 (FTE)
- Grades: 9–12
- Enrollment: 1,996 (2024–2025)
- Student to teacher ratio: 14.46
- Colors: Maroon & Gold
- Athletics conference: University Interscholastic League Class 5A
- Mascot: Coyotes
- Rival: Independence High School
- Website: www.friscoisd.org/o/hhs

Heritage High School is a public high school in Frisco, Texas, United States. It is part of the Frisco Independent School District.

== History ==
Heritage opened for the first time to freshmen and sophomore students in the fall of 2009. For the 2021-2022 school year, the school was rated "A" by the Texas Education Agency. Heritage High School is ranked 105th within Texas. The school offers Advanced Placement (AP) coursework and exams; the AP participation rate at Heritage High School is 57%. Heritage High School is 1 of 12 high schools in the Frisco ISD.

Heritage High School has an 8/10 GREATSCHOOLS rating. This school is rated above average in school quality compared to other schools in Texas.

== Demographics ==
As of the 2024-2025 school year, there are a total of 1,996 students enrolled at Heritage High School.

The racial and ethnic breakdown of the student body is as follows:

- Asian - 44.1%
- White - 25.9%
- African American - 14.8%
- Hispanic/Latino - 9.5%
- Multiracial - 4.8%
- American Indian/Alaskan Native - 0.8%
- Native Hawaiian/Pacific Islander - 0.2%

The total minority enrollment is 74%, 14% of students are economically disadvantaged, and 13% of students are eligible for free or reduced lunches.

== Athletics ==
The Heritage Coyotes compete in the following sports:

- Baseball
- Basketball
- Cross Country
- Football
- Golf
- Powerlifting
- Soccer
- Softball
- Swimming and Diving
- Tennis
- Track and Field
- Volleyball
- Wrestling

=== State Titles ===
- Boys Basketball
  - 2026(5A/D1)

==== District champions ====
- Football (2014-2015)
- Boys Soccer (2012, 2013, 2023)
- Girls Track (2012 - 2014)
- Boys Track (2016)
- Team Tennis (2020)

== Heritage Theatre ==
In fall 2009, Heritage Theatre opened with a production of The Secret Garden. Theatre Fest followed where classes put on shows such as Pygmalion, Alice in Wonderland, and The Miracle Worker. The University Interscholastic League One Act Play was The Butterfly's Evil Spell by Federico Garcia Lorca. The 2010–2011 year had a summer performance of Twelfth Night by William Shakespeare. It also put on La Dispute and Pride and Prejudice.

== Heritage High School Band ==
=== Accomplishments ===
During the school's first two years (2009 and 2010), the band achieved two 1st division ratings at University Interscholastic League contests for marching and concert. Its first show in 2009 was "State of Mind." Its second show in 2010 was "Speed". Its 2011 show "Windsprints" earned the marching band another 1st division rating at University Interscholastic League. The show in 2023 was entitled "Transcontinental". The show in 2024 was entitled "Crazy Train", and the show in 2025 was entitled "The Passion". In 2026, the previous head band director, Jason Prasifka, retired, and Logan Stone was promoted to head band director. His first show in 2026 was entitled "The Euphoria of Peril".

Percussion

In 2025, the Heritage percussion program won the International Percussion Ensemble Competition (IPEC) under the direction of Alan Brawdy. They were invited to perform at the Percussive Arts Society International Convention later that year.

In 2026, the Heritage Drumline received multiple awards at the 2026 Lone Star Classic Drumline Competition, including Best Front Ensemble, Best Bass Line, Best Tenor Line, Best Snare Line, the Steve Weiss gift card, and 1st place in the Standstill 1 - Red Division.

== Heritage High School Orchestra ==
The orchestra program began in 2009 and is directed by Elizabeth Balkema. In 2011, the Heritage Orchestra received superior ratings from all six judges at the Region 24 UIL competition.

== Notable alumni ==
- Kene Nwangwu (2016), professional football player
