= Matt Lepsis =

American football player (born 1974)

No. 78
- Position: Offensive tackle

Personal information
- Born: January 13, 1974 (age 52); Conroe, Texas, U.S.
- Listed height: 6 ft 4 in (1.93 m)
- Listed weight: 290 lb (132 kg)

Career information
- High school: Frisco (Frisco, Texas)
- College: Colorado
- NFL draft: 1997: undrafted

Career history
- Denver Broncos (1997–2007)

Awards and highlights
- 2× Super Bowl champion (XXXII, XXXIII); Second-team All-Big Eight (1995)

Career NFL statistics
- Games played: 150
- Games started: 133
- Fumble recoveries: 2
- Stats at Pro Football Reference

Matthew Stanley Lepsis (born January 13, 1974) is an American former professional football player who was an offensive tackle in the National Football League (NFL). He was originally signed by the Denver Broncos as an undrafted free agent in 1997 and remained with the team until his retirement following the 2007 season. He played college football for the Colorado Buffaloes.

Lepsis won Super Bowl XXXIII as a member of the Broncos.

== Early life ==
Matt Lepsis attended Frisco High School in Frisco, Texas, and was a letterman in football and track and field. In football, he was an All-Southwest selection and was named the Class 3A Defensive Player of the Year as a senior. In track and field, he was a two-time State Discus Champion.

== College career ==
Lepsis went to the University of Colorado Boulder, where he earned All-Big Eight Conference honors as a tight end.

Lepsis was also an All-American thrower for the Colorado Buffaloes track and field team, finishing 7th in the discus throw at the 1995 NCAA Division I Outdoor Track and Field Championships.

== Professional career ==
Lepsis was signed by the Denver Broncos as an undrafted free agent in 1997. He did not miss an offensive snap on a 2004 line that set a franchise record by allowing only 15 sacks, shattering the previous best of 22 sacks set in 1971, to rank third in the NFL.

In Week 7 of the 2006 season, he suffered a season-ending knee injury in a 17–7 victory over the Cleveland Browns. He once again suffered a season-ending injury, in the 2007 season. On January 1, 2008, he announced to his team that he would be retiring after his performance slipped in 2007 and wanted to end his career on his own terms. He officially retired on February 12, 2008.
