= Dylan Horton =

American football player (born 2000)

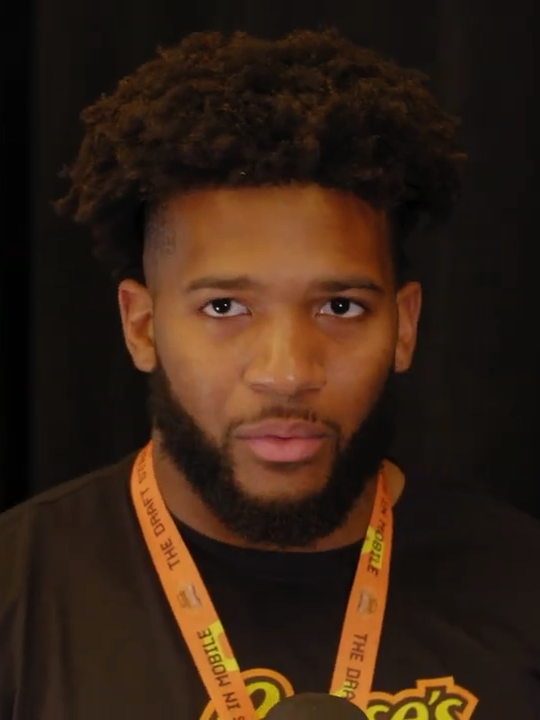
- Horton in 2023

No. 92 – Houston Texans
- Position: Defensive end
- Roster status: Injured reserve

Personal information
- Born: August 21, 2000 (age 26); Frisco, Texas, U.S.
- Listed height: 6 ft 4 in (1.93 m)
- Listed weight: 275 lb (125 kg)

Career information
- High school: Frisco
- College: New Mexico (2018–2019); TCU (2020–2022)
- NFL draft: 2023: 4th round, 109th overall pick

Career history
- Houston Texans (2023–present)

Career NFL statistics as of 2025
- Total tackles: 55
- Sacks: 0.5
- Forced fumbles: 1
- Fumble recoveries: 1
- Pass deflections: 1
- Stats at Pro Football Reference

Dylan Samuel Horton (born August 21, 2000) is an American professional football defensive end for the Houston Texans of the National Football League (NFL). He played college football for the New Mexico Lobos and TCU Horned Frogs.

== Early life ==
Horton grew up in Frisco, Texas and attended Frisco High School, where he played safety on the football team. He initially committed to play college football at SMU. Horton flipped his commitment to New Mexico during his senior year following the departure of SMU head coach Chad Morris.

== College career ==
Horton began his college career playing for the New Mexico Lobos. The New Mexico coaching staff moved him from safety to outside linebacker. Horton played in 17 games over the course of two season. Following the end of the season he entered the NCAA transfer portal.

Horton ultimately transferred to TCU. He was granted waiver to play immediately by the NCAA. Horton was moved from linebacker to defensive end in his first season playing for the Horned Frogs. He became a starter in 2021 and led the team with nine tackles for loss and tied for the team lead with four sacks. Horton was named honorable mention All-Big 12 Conference as a senior. He had four sacks, a forced fumble, and broke up a pass in TCU's 51-45 win over Michigan in the 2022 Fiesta Bowl.

== Professional career ==
Pre-draft measurables
Height	Weight	Arm length	Hand span	Wingspan	40-yard dash	10-yard split	20-yard split	20-yard shuttle	Three-cone drill	Vertical jump	Broad jump	Bench press
6 ft 4 in (1.93 m)	257 lb (117 kg)	33 1/8 in (0.84 m)	9 1/2 in (0.24 m)	6 ft 6 1/2 in (1.99 m)	4.74 s	1.68 s	2.71 s	4.53 s	7.43 s	34.0 in (0.86 m)	10 ft 0 in (3.05 m)	18 reps
All values from NFL Combine/Pro Day

Horton was selected by the Houston Texans in the fourth round with the 109th pick of the 2023 NFL draft.

On November 22, 2023, Horton announced he was stepping away from football due to a personal health matter, and was placed on the non-football illness list. He was diagnosed with Stage IV Hodgkin lymphoma in December, which entered remission in March 2024. Horton completed radiation therapy in May.

On July 18, 2024, Horton was placed on the active/NFI list, and placed on reserves to begin the season. He was activated on October 5.

On August 25, 2026, Horton was placed on injured reserve due to a torn Achilles suffered during practice.

== NFL career statistics ==
Legend
**Bold**	Career high

=== Regular season ===
Year	Team	Games		Tackles					Interceptions						Fumbles				
Year	Team	GP	GS	Cmb	Solo	Ast	Sck	TFL	Int	Yds	Avg	Lng	TD	PD	FF	Fum	FR	Yds	TD
2023	HOU	10	0	13	8	5	0.0	**1**	0	0	0.0	0	0	0	0	0	**1**	0	0
2024	HOU	13	0	16	6	10	0.0	**1**	0	0	0.0	0	0	**1**	0	0	0	0	0
2025	HOU	16	0	**26**	**11**	**15**	**0.5**	**1**	0	0	0.0	0	0	0	**1**	0	0	0	0
Career		39	0	55	25	30	0.5	3	0	0	0.0	0	0	1	1	0	1	0	0

=== Postseason ===
Year	Team	Games		Tackles					Interceptions						Fumbles				
Year	Team	GP	GS	Cmb	Solo	Ast	Sck	TFL	Int	Yds	Avg	Lng	TD	PD	FF	Fum	FR	Yds	TD
2024	HOU	2	0	0	0	0	0.0	0	0	0	0.0	0	0	0	0	0	0	0	0
2025	HOU	2	0	**2**	**1**	**1**	0.0	0	0	0	0.0	0	0	0	0	0	0	0	0
Career		4	0	2	1	1	0.0	0	0	0	0.0	0	0	0	0	0	0	0	0
