= Michael Hawkins Jr. =

American football player (born 2005)

No. 3 – West Virginia Mountaineers
- Position: Quarterback
- Class: (redshirt) Sophomore

Personal information
- Born: October 29, 2005 (age 21)
- Listed height: 6 ft 1 in (1.85 m)
- Listed weight: 203 lb (92 kg)

Career information
- High school: Emerson (McKinney, Texas)
- College: Oklahoma (2024–2025); West Virginia (2026–present)
- Stats at ESPN

Michael Hawkins Jr. (born October 29, 2005) is an American college football quarterback for the West Virginia Mountaineers. He previously played for the Oklahoma Sooners.

== Early life ==
Hawkins attended Emerson High School in McKinney, Texas. He began his high school career at Allen High School before transferring for safety concerns following a racist incident. As a senior, he threw for 3,039 yards and 41 touchdowns, while also rushing for 1,172 yards and ten touchdowns. A four-star recruit, he committed to play college football at the University of Oklahoma over offers from TCU, Alabama, Arkansas, Michigan, Texas Tech, among others.

== College career ==
=== Oklahoma ===
Hawkins entered his true freshman season as the backup to Jackson Arnold. In Oklahoma's fourth game of the season against Tennessee, Hawkins replaced Arnold, finishing with 132 yards passing and a touchdown in a 25–15 defeat. Following his performance against Tennessee, Hawkins was named Oklahoma's starting quarterback against Auburn. In his first career start, he threw for 161 yards while also rushing for 69 yards and a touchdown, leading Oklahoma to a 27–21 victory. Hawkins appeared as the starting quarterback for Oklahoma in the 2024 Armed Forces Bowl against Navy. On December 31, 2025, Hawkins announced plans to enter the transfer portal.

=== West Virginia ===
On January 5, 2026, Hawkins transferred to West Virginia.

=== Statistics ===
Year	Team	Games			Passing								Rushing			
Year	Team	GP	GS	Record	Cmp	Att	Pct	Yds	Y/A	TD	Int	Rtg	Att	Yds	Avg	TD
2024	Oklahoma	7	4	1–3	76	120	63.3	783	6.5	3	2	123.1	69	204	3.0	1
2025	Oklahoma	2	1	1–0	15	27	55.6	167	6.2	3	0	144.2	15	58	3.9	1
2026	West Virginia	10	10	5–5	120	209	57.4	2,128	10.2	13	3	160.6	207	960	4.6	20
Career		19	15	7−8	211	356	59.3	3,078	8.6	19	5	146.7	291	1,222	4.2	22
