= Zion Richardson =

American basketball player (born 2001)

Personal information
- Born: January 23, 2001 (age 25) Indianapolis, Indiana, U.S.
- Listed height: 6 ft 4 in (1.93 m)
- Listed weight: 205 lb (93 kg)

Career information
- High school: Liberty High School (Frisco, Texas)
- College: Wofford (2019-2021) Quincy (2022-2024) California State Fullerton (2024-2025) BG Hessing Leitershofen Kangaroos (2025-Present)
- Position: Shooting guard / Point guard

Career highlights
- Second-team All-GLVC (2024)

Zion Richardson (/ˈzaɪən/, born January 23, 2001) is a Bahamian-American Professional basketball player for the BG Hessing Leitershofen Kangaroos in German ProB.

== High school career ==
Richardson attended Liberty High School (Frisco, TX), where he helped lead his team to the second round of state three times. He holds the school's scoring record with 1,750 career points. Richardson was named the District 13-5A Defensive Player of the Year as a sophomore. He scored 19.1 points per game while averaging 5.0 rebounds and 5.0 assists per contest, earning District MVP and all-region honors as a junior. In his senior campaign, Richardson averaged 20 points, 5.0 rebounds, and 4.0 assists per game en route to all-region, all-state, and District MVP honors leading his team to back to back District Championship Titles. Richardson also set the single-season record for points, assists, field goals, and free throws made. He competed for Texas Hardwork and YGC36 on the Amateur Athletic Union circuit. He committed to playing college basketball for Wofford over offers from Texas State, Rice, Western Michigan, Louisiana Tech and others.

== College career ==
In his freshman 2019–20 season at Wofford he appeared in 32 games, averaging 1.2 points and 1.2 rebounds per game, dished out 17 assists and totaled seven steals. Richardson spent the last two years at Quincy University. His first season at Quincy, he averaged 11.4 points, 5.7 rebounds and 1.5 assists. In the 2023–24 season, for Quincy he averaged 17.7 points, 7.2 rebounds, and 1.8 assists in 26 games played. He put up five double-doubles and pulled down a career-high 15 rebounds in a contest against Southwest Baptist. He finished third in conference play leaders for both points and rebounds at 19.1 points and 8.1 rebounds. Richardson played his final 2024–25 season for the California State Fullerton Titans for Coach Dedrique Taylor he appeared in 21 games, averaging 7.6 points, 3.3 rebounds and 0.9 assists. He put up two double-doubles, including a 14 points and 11 rebounds performance against UC Irvine and a 16 points and 10 rebounds output versus UC Santa Barbara.

== Professional career ==
On September 8, 2025, Richardson signed his first professional contract overseas with German club BG Hessing Leitershofen Kangaroos competing in the Germany PRO B South Division.

== College statistics ==
Legend
GP	Games played	GS	Games started	MPG	Minutes per game
FG%	Field goal percentage	3P%	3-point field goal percentage	FT%	Free throw percentage
RPG	Rebounds per game	APG	Assists per game	SPG	Steals per game
BPG	Blocks per game	PPG	Points per game	**Bold**	Career high

College
Year	Team	GP	GS	MPG	FG%	3P%	FT%	RPG	APG	SPG	BPG	PPG
2019-20	Wofford	**32**	0.0	8.1	.324	.235	.632	1.2	0.5	0.3	0.0	1.2
2022-23	Quincy	27	26	28.9	.411	**.361**	.674	5.7	1.5	1.0	0.1	11.4
2023-24	Quincy	26	**26**	**32.2**	**.429**	.336	**.844**	**7.2**	**1.8**	**1.2**	**0.2**	**17.7**
Career		85	52	23.1	.388	.310	.716	4.7	1.3	0.8	0.1	10.1
