= Murder of Austin Metcalf =

2025 murder in Frisco, Texas, U.S.

- Yearbook photo of Austin Metcalf
- Location: 33.157913°N 96.823765°W; David Kuykendall Stadium, Memorial High School, Frisco, Texas, U.S.
- Date: April 2, 2025; 19 months ago c. 10:00 a.m. (CDT; UTC−05:00)
- Attack type: Murder by stabbing
- Deaths: Austin Metcalf
- Perpetrator: Karmelo Anthony
- Verdict: Guilty
- Convictions: Murder
- Sentence: 35 years in prison

On April 2, 2025, Austin Metcalf, a 17-year-old student at Memorial High School, was fatally stabbed by Karmelo Anthony, a Centennial High School student of the same age, during a weather delay at a school track meet in Frisco, Texas, United States. According to police arrest reports and trial testimony, the encounter occurred under a team tent after Metcalf physically pushed Anthony while he was seated. Anthony immediately sought out law enforcement at the scene and was taken into custody, later pleading not guilty and asserting self-defense. On June 9, 2026, Anthony was convicted of murder at trial and sentenced to 35 years in prison by the jury. The case became a subject of national public attention, sparking widespread discussion surrounding self-defense standards, physical disparities, and racial dynamics in criminal sentencing.

== Background ==
=== Austin Metcalf ===
Austin Matthew Metcalf (July 31, 2007 – April 2, 2025) was a junior at Memorial High School in Frisco, Texas. He was MVP linebacker of the school's American football team and participated in track and field. His twin brother, Hunter Metcalf, was his football teammate.

=== Karmelo Anthony ===
Karmelo Sincere Anthony (born May 10, 2007) was born in Baton Rouge, Louisiana, the oldest of four children. The family later moved to Texas. Anthony was a student at Centennial High School, also in Frisco, where he was captain of both the track and football teams and maintained a 3.7 GPA. He was employed at Foot Locker and H-E-B, and at the time of the incident, was on track to graduate early the following month. He had no prior criminal convictions. During an April 2025 bond hearing, District Judge Angela Tucker cited Anthony's academic standing, lack of prior record, and athletic leadership when reducing his bond from $1 million to $250,000. Anthony and Metcalf did not know each other.

== Incident ==
The stabbing occurred at a track meet, at the Memorial High School tent in David Kuykendall Stadium at approximately 10:00 a.m. CDT on April 2, 2025. The altercation started when the track and field championship event was delayed due to thunderstorms and heavy downpours.

Due to the rain, every team except for Karmelo Anthony's high school had set up a tent. One of Anthony's teammates testified that he, Anthony, and some others had sought shelter from the rain at the nearby baseball dugout until a baseball coach told them to leave.

According to witness testimony, Anthony was called over to the Memorial High School tent by Memorial student Eddie Parra. Parra and Anthony had a friendly interaction for about five minutes.

Hunter, Austin Metcalf's twin brother, approached Anthony and asked him to leave the tent. Austin then confronted Anthony. During the argument that ensued, Anthony allegedly said, "Touch me and see what happens," while reaching his hand into his backpack. According to witnesses, Metcalf responded, "You don't have anything in that backpack, it's Frisco," before physically engaging Anthony while he was seated. According to the Frisco Police Arrest Report, Austin stood up and physically pushed Anthony to force him out of the tent. Trial witnesses established a significant physical disparity during the confrontation, noting that Metcalf was standing over a seated Anthony. In response to being pushed, Anthony pulled out a black knife from the backpack and stabbed Metcalf once in the chest before running away.

After being stabbed, Metcalf ran down the bleachers, grabbing his chest and telling those around him to get help. When police arrived, he was neither conscious nor breathing, and athletic trainers were performing chest compressions on him. Austin Metcalf was pronounced dead minutes after arriving in the hospital.

According to the arresting officer, when told to keep his hands in the air, Anthony said "I was protecting myself". The affidavit states he was "emotional" and "crying hysterically" after he was arrested. The officer then communicated to others that he had the alleged suspect in custody, to which Anthony responded, "I'm not 'alleged'. I did it."

As he was being escorted to the police car, Anthony reportedly said: "He put his hands on me, I told him not to". While he was sitting in the back seat of the police car, he asked of Metcalf "Is he going to be OK?" and asked the officer if what he did could be considered self-defense.

== Aftermath ==
The courts approved Anthony moving to an "undisclosed location" due to safety concerns in the pretrial period. According to the Next Generation Action Network (NGAN), a nonprofit organization working with Anthony's family, the move was precipitated by an "alarming increase in death threats, continued harassment, and physical intimidation" targeted at him and his family's home.

Metcalf's mother and father both had their homes swatted, with one such incident resulting in a SWAT team showing up to Metcalf's father's home with their weapons drawn. Additionally, both Metcalf's and Anthony's fathers were forced to leave their jobs after facing harassment and doxxing. Angela Tucker, the judge who lowered the bond to $250,000, was doxxed and received multiple threats from unknown people. The Federal Bureau of Investigation (FBI) and the local sheriff's office launched an investigation into these incidents.

=== Fundraisers ===
Anthony's family set up a crowdfunding campaign on GiveSendGo to pay for legal defense and other expenses, raising over $615,000 by June 4, 2026. GoFundMe crowdfunding campaigns were launched by Metcalf's father and the owner of the pizzeria in Frisco where Metcalf worked part-time, raising nearly $250,000.

The founder of GiveSendGo, Jacob Wells, compared the case to those of Kyle Rittenhouse and Daniel Penny, stating that Anthony should be afforded the "same presumption of innocence" as anyone else. On May 2, GiveSendGo turned off the commenting function on Anthony's fundraiser page, citing an "unacceptable volume of racist and derogatory remarks".

Anthony's GiveSendGo fundraiser was taken down after his conviction. GiveSendGo said the fundraiser was meant to support Anthony's pre-trial needs and that the funds had been disbursed over the previous year. "With that stated purpose complete, the fundraiser has been closed," the platform stated.

=== NGAN press conference ===
Anthony's parents and the NGAN held a press conference on April 17, 2025. Metcalf's father attended the event. However, Dallas police asked Metcalf to leave. After Metcalf had left the press conference, NGAN founder and president Dominique Alexander said Metcalf was "uninvited" and that his presence was "disrespectful to the dignity of his son". Metcalf said he thought it would be "an opportunity for the two families to come together in a productive way".

=== Misinformation ===
Anthony and his family were criticized online due to allegations that they bought a car and a $900,000 house with donated funds. According to Snopes, the family had not withdrawn any money from donations as of April 2025, and these claims appeared to originate with a story from the Daily Mail.

Shortly after Metcalf's death, an X account impersonating the Frisco police chief began spreading misinformation and a fake autopsy report. The post gained millions of views on X and other social media platforms. The Frisco Police Department and the FBI began investigating the account for police impersonation.

== Legal proceedings ==
Anthony was charged with murder and transported to the Collin County jail. He was charged as an adult, since, under the Texas criminal justice system, defendants age 17 and older are prosecuted as adults.

On April 14, 2025, Judge Angela Tucker lowered Anthony's bond from $1 million to $250,000, citing his clean criminal record and his academic and athletic achievements. Anthony was released on bond the same day. According to his release conditions, an adult was required to supervise Anthony at all times, he was required to contact the judge's bailiff every Friday morning, and he was prohibited from using social media or contacting Metcalf's family.

Anthony's lawyer said that he would plead not guilty and claim self-defense at his future trial. Anthony could not have been subject to a sentence of life without parole or the death penalty due to his age.

On June 24, 2025, a grand jury indicted Anthony on charges of murder.

=== Trial ===
Anthony's trial began with jury selection on June 1, 2026, in Collin County, with Judge John Roach Jr. presiding. Jurors filled out a questionnaire, and the jury pool included nearly 600 people. During selection, the defense raised a Batson challenge after the prosecution struck three Black female jurors from the pool whom the defense considered to be "similarly situated" to a White female juror that was not struck. The prosecution argued that the three women were struck for race-neutral reasons, namely their status as teachers of school-aged children. Judge Roach sided with the prosecution and permitted the strikes.

On June 3, the jury was seated with no Black jurors, though several were people of color. Including alternates, the jury was composed of 11 women and 7 men. One of the seated jurors was an educator who did not work in a traditional school environment.

Opening statements began on June 4, with Collin County District Attorney Bill Wirskye stating the killing was an unjustified murder in which Anthony provoked Metcalf, while defense attorney Michael Howard countered that Anthony acted in a split second of fear and chaos after being physically confronted while seated. Jurors were shown surveillance footage of the incident, and coaches testified regarding track meet shelter practices during weather delays.

Students who were under the tent during the stabbing testified on June 5 regarding the verbal exchange leading up to the physical contact. During cross-examination, the defense focused on establishing the physical disparity between the parties, noting that Metcalf was 50 to 60 pounds (23 to 27 kg) heavier and was standing directly over Anthony while he was seated. First responders and the arresting school resource officer also testified.

The defense's case started on the afternoon of June 5. The defense presented testimony from track coaches confirming that sharing team tents during severe weather delays was customary, and a witness testified that Metcalf physically grabbed Anthony prior to the stabbing. A police officer testified that carrying the knife was against school policy but not criminally unlawful under Texas law. The defense rested on June 8 without calling Anthony to testify, and closing arguments occurred on June 9.

The jury found Anthony guilty of murder after approximately three hours of deliberation, rejecting the "sudden passion" claim, and sentenced him to 35 years in prison.

=== Post-trial, incarceration, and appeal ===
On June 10, 2026, the day following his conviction, Anthony was transferred to the custody of the Texas Department of Criminal Justice (TDCJ) and incarcerated at the Wallace Pack Unit in Navasota, Texas. He filed a formal notice to appeal his conviction the same day. Under Texas law, Anthony will become eligible for parole after serving half of his 35-year sentence (17.5 years).

In August 2026, Anthony's new appellate defense team filed a motion requesting a new trial. The motion alleged that a pre-trial "gentleman's agreement" between his original defense counsel and prosecutors to exclude background character evidence had effectively coerced Anthony into not testifying in his own defense. Prior to the hearing, District Judge John Roach Jr. was recused from the post-conviction proceedings, and Visiting Judge Michael Chitty was assigned to hear the motion.

During the multi-day evidentiary hearing, unsealed records revealed character disclosures regarding both individuals that had been withheld from the jury. Prosecutors presented text messages and disciplinary records alleging Anthony had engaged in previous altercations, disruptive school behavior, and explicit texts. Defense counsel presented Metcalf's juvenile record and school disciplinary history, which included a juvenile probation sentence for racial graffiti, past suspensions, and documented incidents of racialized hostility and verbal threats against minority students.

On August 22, 2026, Judge Chitty denied the motion for a new trial. Anthony's appellate attorneys subsequently confirmed that they are continuing to pursue direct appeals through higher Texas appellate courts, citing procedural deviations and constitutional concerns during the original trial.

== Reactions ==
The case attracted national attention, especially on social media, in large part because of the racial undertones of the case, with Metcalf being White and Anthony being Black. Both Metcalf's father and District Attorney Bill Wirskye have rejected the notion that race played a role in the murder, with Wirskye stating, "this case has nothing to do with race”. The arrest report does not list race as a contributing factor. The murder contributed to greater racial tension, especially within the Frisco community, which had already faced racial division.

On April 19, 2025, the group "Protect White Americans" held a protest at David Kuykendall Stadium, the place where Metcalf was killed. With about two dozen in attendance, the protestors demanded Anthony be returned to police custody until his trial. Two protestors were arrested. Metcalf's father told the organizer of the protest, far-right activist Jake Lang, that he disapproved of his efforts, stating, "You're trying to create more race divide than bridging the gap. I do not condone anything you do." He also requested that his son's school portrait be removed from the group's website. On June 2, 2026, Lang was arrested for criminal trespassing in relation to his activity at David Kuykendall Stadium and for an incident at the George A. Purefoy Municipal Center in Frisco.

During the trial, supporters of both Anthony and Metcalf had a continued presence outside the Collin County courthouse. Lang rallied with supporters outside of the courthouse and called for Anthony to be "lynched". When the verdict was announced, arguments erupted between both camps, and deputies had to break up the confrontations, including handcuffing a Black male Metcalf supporter who allegedly assaulted another Black man. An Anthony supporter, who was Black, stated, "How can they reach a verdict like this in a case like this? Americans have shown they don't care about Black people" and that he felt "a loss of faith in America". Dominique Alexander with NGAN pledged $10,000 to an appeal for Anthony and criticized the absence of Black people represented on the jury. On June 10, Lang was arrested on charges of making a terroristic threat for allegedly threatening to kill Anthony. His bond was initially set at $1 million, but it was later reduced to $250,000 by Judge Roach and he was barred from entering the State of Texas except for court proceedings. He posted bond and was released on June 23.

Following the verdict, several politicians, celebrities, and organizations gave mixed reactions to the verdict. Cardi B, an American rapper, posted on X that the verdict was "disgusting" and that "This is not justice, this is trying to make an example" out of Anthony. Representative Jasmine Crockett, a Democratic congresswoman who represents parts of Dallas, said on a social media livestream that Anthony was among many people who have been "over prosecuted" and given "crazy sentences". The Collin County Young Democrats and Collin County chapter of the NAACP also criticized the verdict, with the latter adding they were "enraged" by the verdict and that it raised questions concerning "fairness, representation, and confidence in our justice system". Republican state representative Jared Patterson, who represents Frisco, called the murder "a senseless and heartbreaking tragedy" and celebrated the verdict as justice, a sentiment which was shared by Frisco city councilman Burt Thakur and Republican state representative Matt Shaheen. The Collin-Denton chapter of the Texas Coalition of Black Democrats put emphasis on the "tragedy" for both sides and the impact on the community. State representative Vikki Goodwin, who is the Democratic nominee for Texas lieutenant governor in the 2026 election, also focused on affirming the feelings on both sides, while still recognizing the perceived concerns around the trial and verdict.

During his appearance on a podcast following the verdict and sentencing, Jeff Metcalf, the victim's father, referred to Anthony as a "watermelon felon", a phrase widely viewed as invoking a racist stereotype, in order to provoke a reaction and increase the visibility of the podcast. He also stated that he forgave Anthony for killing his son, as he did not want to "carry the hate and the anger", and that he was not racist, stating "I could [sic] care less about the color of your skin. We all bleed the same color."
