= Bill Wirskye =

American lawyer

- Born: William Hawthorne Wirskye
- Education: Southern Methodist University Law School, 1993; University of Texas at Dallas
- Occupation: First Assistant District Attorney in Collin County, Texas

William Hawthorne Wirskye is a Texas prosecutor who is currently the First Assistant District Attorney in the Collin County District Attorney's Office in Collin County, Texas. Wirskye is best known for being the lead prosecutor who tried the Kaufman County DA murders, which ultimately resulted in the death penalty for the defendant, former Justice of the Peace of Kaufman County, Eric Williams. Before that, he was a Dallas County prosecutor for 12 years.

== Early life and education ==
Wirskye graduated from Southern Methodist University Law School in 1993, and has a bachelor's degree from the University of Texas at Dallas.

== Career ==
Wirskye assisted prosecutor Toby Shook in prosecuting the Texas Seven. The death penalty was secured against all of the surviving members of the infamous prison group. In 2013, Wirskye was the lead prosecutor on the capital murder case against the Kaufman County DA murderer, Eric Williams. In 2020, Wirskye was the lead prosecutor on the capital murder case against Brandon McCall, who killed Richardson Police Officer David Sherrard. In 2026, Wirskye assisted lead prosecutor Dewey Mitchell in the prosecution of Karmelo Anthony.

Prior to joining the Collin County DA's Office, Wirskye was the first assistant in Dallas County under embattled District Attorney Susan Hawk.
