= Liberty High School (Frisco, Texas) =

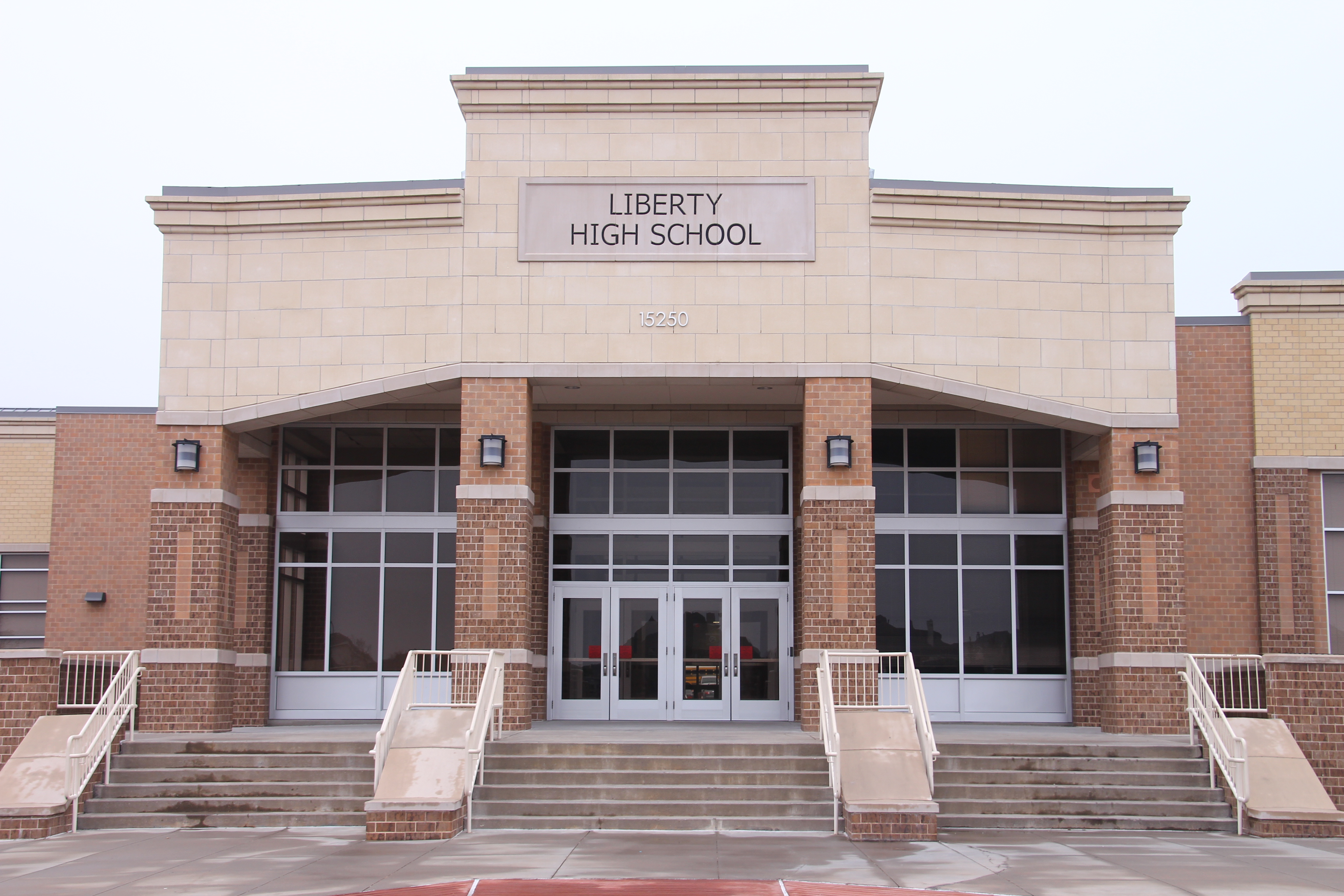

Location
- 15250 Rolater Road; Frisco, Texas 75035; United States; 33.13911°N 96.74281°W

Information
- School type: Public high school
- Motto: Work Hard, Be Nice
- Established: 2006
- School district: Frisco Independent School District
- Principal: Stacey Whaling
- Teaching staff: 123.19 (on an FTE basis)
- Grades: 9-12
- Enrollment: 1,730 (2023-2024)
- Student to teacher ratio: 14.04
- Colors: Red and black
- Athletics conference: UIL Class 5A
- Mascot: Redhawk
- Rival: Centennial High School
- Newspaper: WINGSPAN
- Yearbook: The Legacy
- Website: Liberty High School website

Liberty High School is a public high school located in the city of Frisco, Texas, United States. It is classified as a 5A school by the UIL. It is a part of the Frisco Independent School District located in east central Collin County, and is currently one of twelve high schools in the district. The school initially opened in 2006 in what is now Fowler Middle School and the following year opened in its own building on Rolater Road. In 2015, the school was rated "Met Standard" by the Texas Education Agency.

== Wingspan ==
Wingspan is Liberty High School's award winning website. The website has won multiple NSPA Pacemaker Awards among many others throughout the years. The editorial staff consists of students, working together with the rest of the staff. In 2015, the CSPA named it among the top 13 new high school sites in the nation.

== Athletics ==
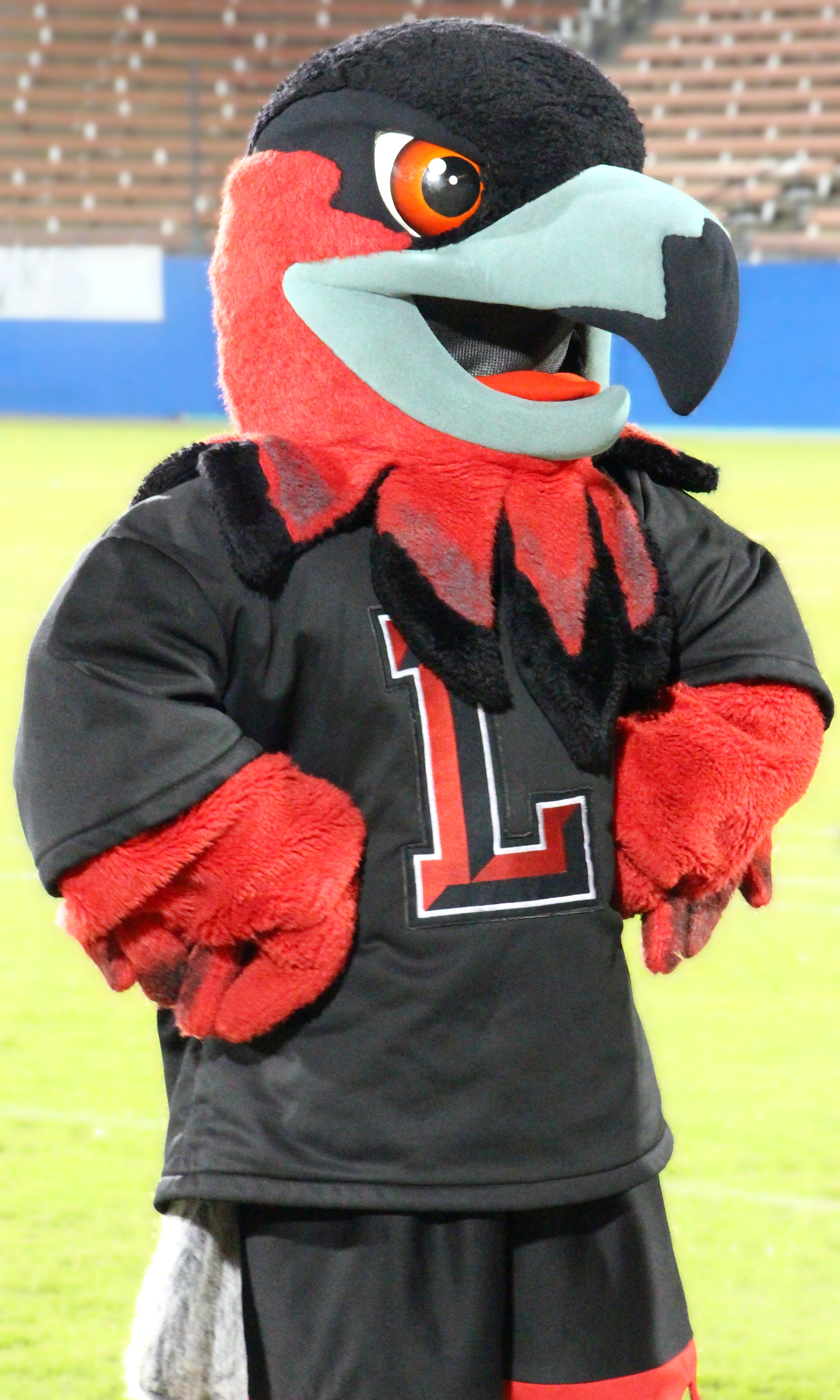
Rocky, the Redhawk mascot

The Liberty Redhawks compete in the following sports: State championships: In 2017, the girls' cross country team won the 5A state championship. In 2020, the girls' varsity basketball team won the state championship in a 35-26 victory over San Antonio Veterans Memorial High School.

- Baseball
- Basketball
- Cross Country
- Football
- Golf
- Powerlifting
- Soccer
- Softball
- Tennis
- Track and Field
- Swimming and Diving
- Volleyball
- Wrestling

== Debate team ==
Liberty's speech and debate team has won district, regional, and state titles in Lincoln-Douglas Debate, Policy (CX) Debate, and Informative and Persuasive Extemporaneous Speaking, including UIL CX state qualifications in 2017 and 2018, as well as winning the 2018 5A State Championship title in Lincoln-Douglas Debate. Although occasionally participating in National Speech and Debate Association competitions, the team primarily competes in UIL.

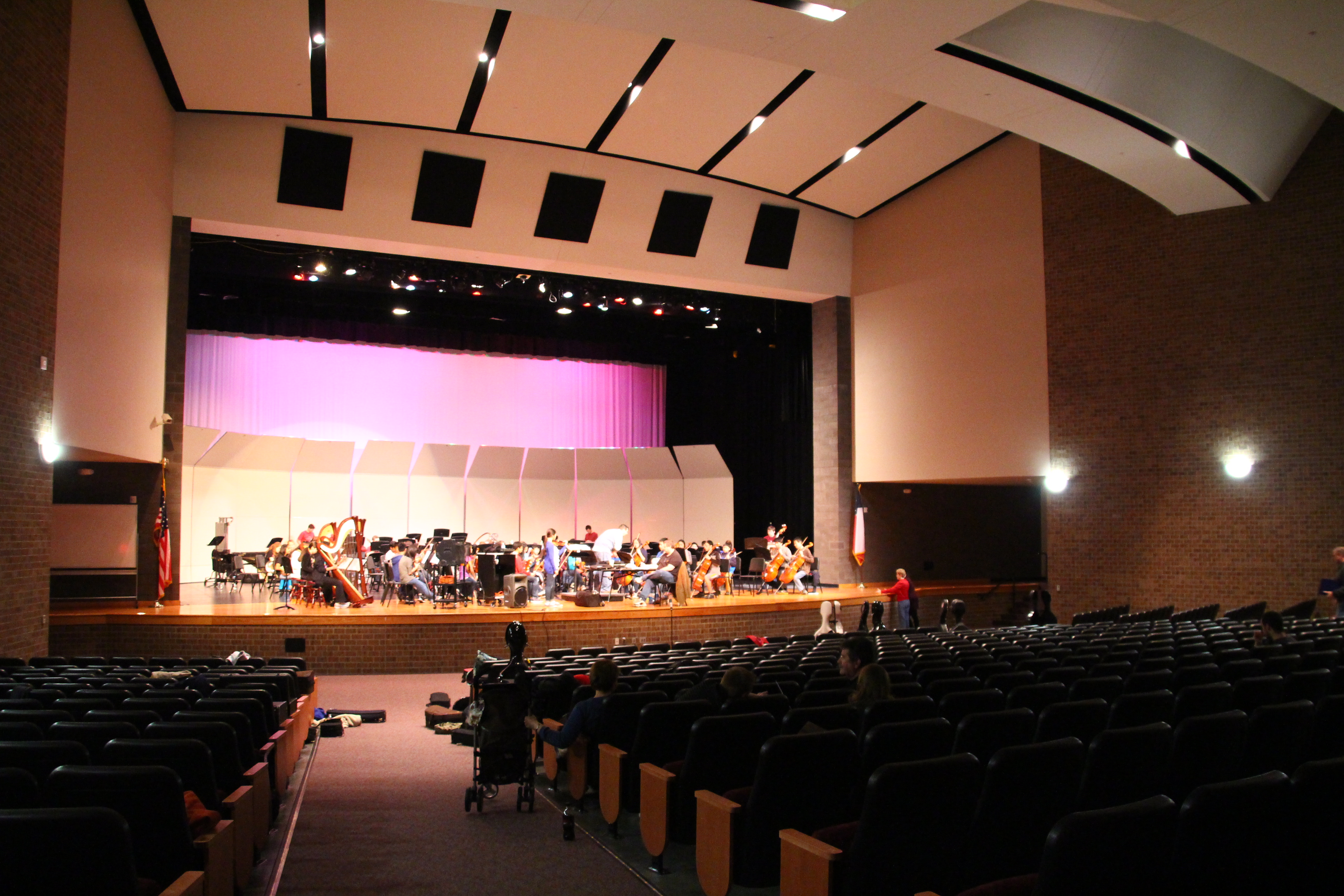
Auditorium

== Academic Decathlon ==
Since opening in 2006, Liberty has excelled at the United States Academic Decathlon. At state level, for the years of 06-07 and 07–08, the team won second place in the 3A division. In the 08-09 year, Liberty won state championship in the 4A division. During the 11-12 competition, it placed second in the regional round as well as 9th in the state round at San Antonio, Texas.

== Notable alumni ==
- Laci Mosley (2009) - actress
- Jay Ajayi (2011) - former NFL player
- Sasha Lane (2014) - actress
- Keaton Parks (2015) - MLS player with New York City FC
- Hannah Anderson (2019) - NWSL player with Orlando Pride
- Zion Richardson (2019) - professional basketball player
- Evan Stewart (2022) - college football player with Oregon
