= Lebanon Trail High School =

Public school in Texas, United States

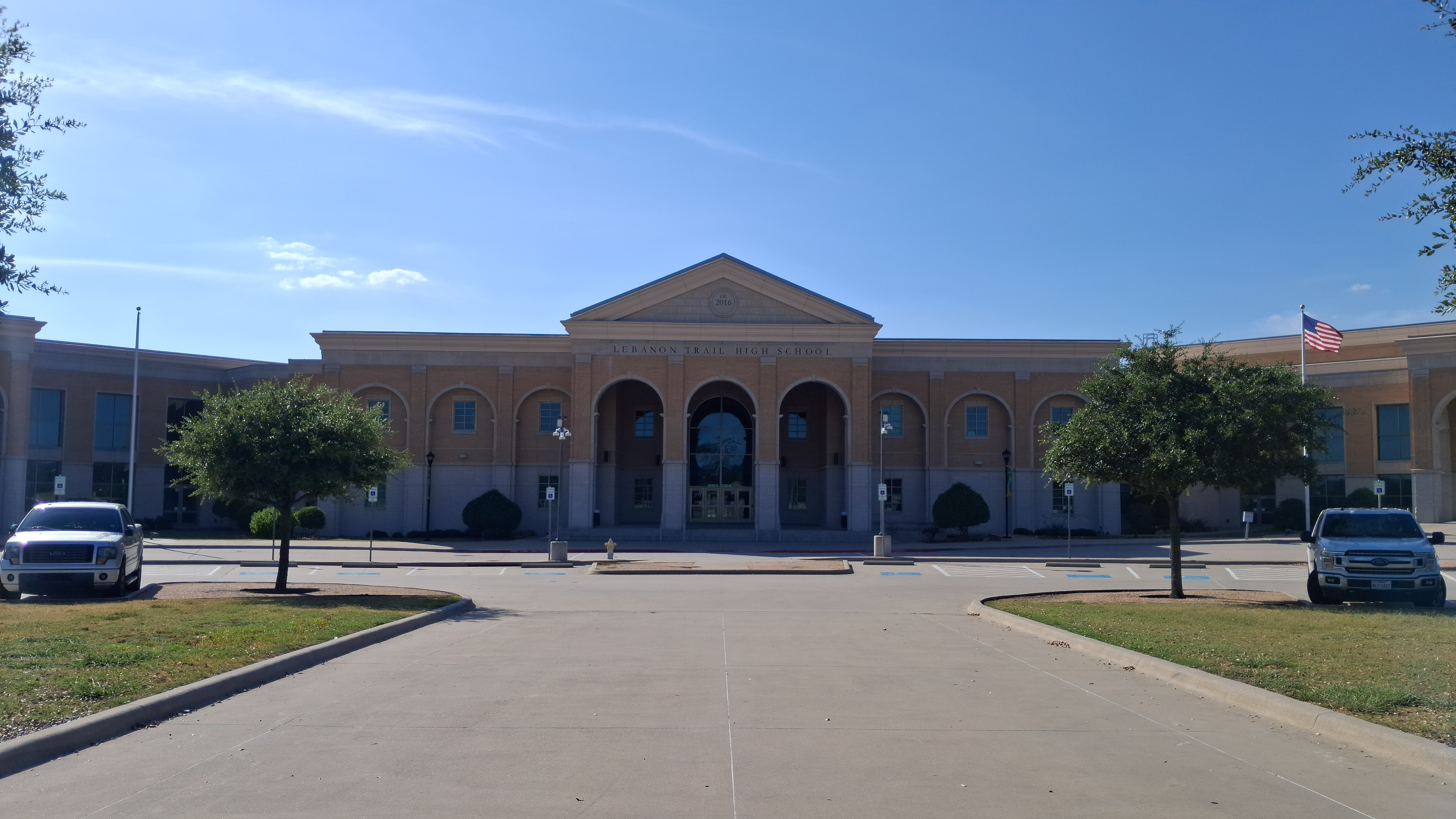

Location
- 5151 Ohio Drive; Frisco, Texas 75035; United States; 33.121°N 96.799°W

Information
- Type: Public high school
- Motto: Our mission is to inspire thoughtful, successful, and socially responsible leaders through a learning community driven by values and achievement.
- Established: 2016
- School district: Frisco Independent School District
- NCES District ID: 482001013095
- Principal: Fern Bamfo-Addo
- Faculty: 136.84 (on FTE basis)
- Grades: 9-12
- Enrollment: 2,110 (2023-2024)
- Student to teacher ratio: 15.42
- Colors: Green and gold
- Athletics conference: UIL Class 5A
- Mascot: Trail Blazers
- Newspaper: The Gold Quill
- Website: Lebanon Trail High School

Lebanon Trail High School is a public high school located in Frisco, Texas, United States that is part of the Frisco Independent School District. The school opened its doors in August 2016 for the 2016–2017 academic year. The school is the district's ninth high school. Upon opening, only freshman attended the school, unlike most other high schools in the district. This decision was made by the district in order to not move students from high schools multiple times, as other high schools had recently opened in the area less than 4 years prior. Around 2,000 students attend Lebanon High making it one of the largest high schools in Frisco ISD in terms of student population. For the 2021-2022 school year, the school was rated "A" by the Texas Education Agency.

== Namesake ==
The school is named for Lebanon, a community which existed at the site about half a century before Frisco and was located near the Preston Trail. An initial decision to name the school Lebanon High School caused controversy among parents and students alike, who felt that the school's name would be too reminiscent of the Middle Eastern country of the same name; the community was allegedly in favor of a more "American-themed name."

== Athletics ==
The Lebanon Trail Blazers compete in the following sports:

- Cross Country
- Golf
- Swimming and Diving
- Tennis
- Track and Field
- Wrestling
- Football
- Softball
- Powerlifting
- Basketball
- Soccer
- Volleyball
- Baseball

== Orchestra ==
In the 2020 TMEA Honor String Orchestra Competition, the Lebanon Trail Chamber Orchestra competed for the first time in the school's history. After an initial round of judging, the Lebanon Trail Chamber Orchestra was one of 11 finalists that advanced to the second and final round of judging, where they received 6th place overall out of 39 entries from the best high school orchestra programs in the state of Texas.

== Band ==
In the 2019 UIL 5A State Marching Band Preliminary Competition, which was their first opportunity to advance to the State Competitions, the TrailBlazer Band received first overall in the Area Competition and therefore advanced to the State Finals that includes the top twelve bands from the preliminary competition. In the State Finals, the Trail Blazers received 8th overall out of 36 schools. The Trailblazer band in 2025 made first place at the Mckinney Marching Competition and then proceeded to make State, advancing to finals and making 4th out of 38 schools.

== Theatre ==
In the 2021 UIL 5A State One Act Competition, which was Lebanon Trail Theatre's first time attending state they placed Sixth overall for their performance. The following year, for their One Act performance of Cover of Life they advanced all the way to the UIL 5A State One Act Competition, where they placed eighth overall. From Zone to State they won numerous awards for all different aspects of the production.
