= Independence High School (Frisco, Texas) =

Public school in Texas, United States

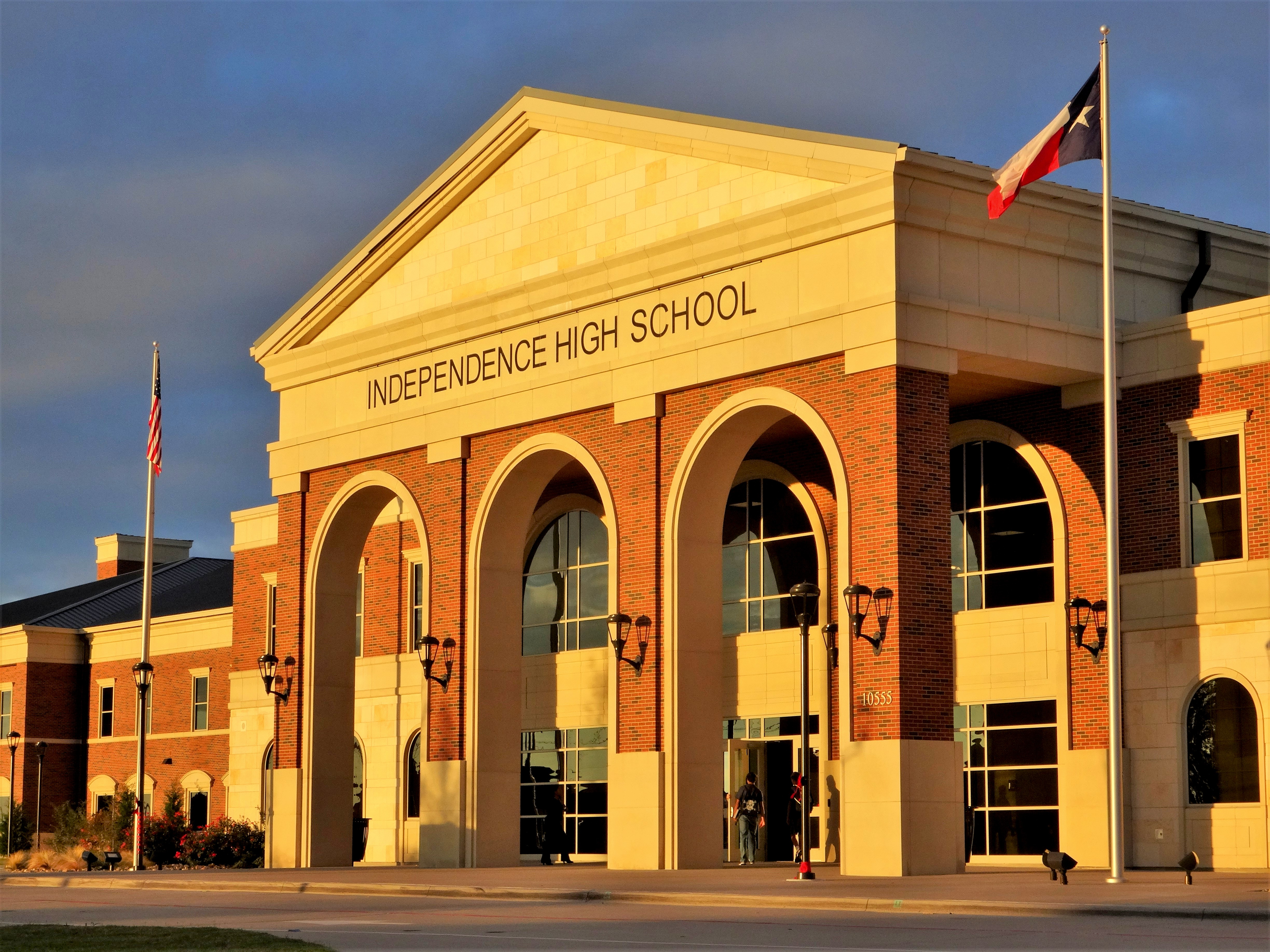

Location
- 10555 Independence Parkway; Frisco, Texas; United States; 33.1646°N 96.7516°W

Information
- Established: 2014
- School district: Frisco Independent School District
- Principal: Alan Waligura
- Teaching staff: 110.74 (FTE)
- Grades: 9-12
- Gender: Coeducational
- Enrollment: 1,698 (2024-2025)
- Student to teacher ratio: 15.34
- Colors: Purple and black
- Athletics conference: UIL Class 5A
- Mascot: Knight
- Newspaper: Knight News
- Yearbook: The Knight
- Website: https://www.friscoisd.org/o/ihs

Independence High School is a public high school located in the city of Frisco, Texas (USA) and classified as a 5A school by UIL. It is a part of the Frisco Independent School District located within Collin County. It opened in the fall of 2014 to freshmen, sophomore, and junior students. The first class to graduate was the class of 2016. For the 2021-2022 school year, the school was rated "A" by the Texas Education Agency.

== History ==
Independence High School was opened to students in 2014.

Alan Waligura has been principal since the school's opening in 2014.

== Athletics ==
The Independence Knights compete in the following sports:

- Baseball
- Basketball
- Cross Country
- Football
- Golf
- Powerlifting
- Soccer
- Softball
- Swimming and Diving
- Tennis
- Track and Field
- Volleyball
- Wrestling

== Notable alumni ==
- Elijah Arroyo (Class of 2021), NFL tight end for the Seattle Seahawks
- Wyatt Sanford (Class of 2024), MLB shortstop for the Pittsburgh Pirates
- Jordyn Tyson (Graduated from Allen High but attended Independence his junior year) (Class of 2022), NFL wide receiver for the New Orleans Saints
- Braylon Braxton (Class of 2021), NFL quarterback for the New Orleans Saints
