= Centennial High School (Frisco, Texas) =

Public high school in Frisco, Texas

Frisco Centennial High School

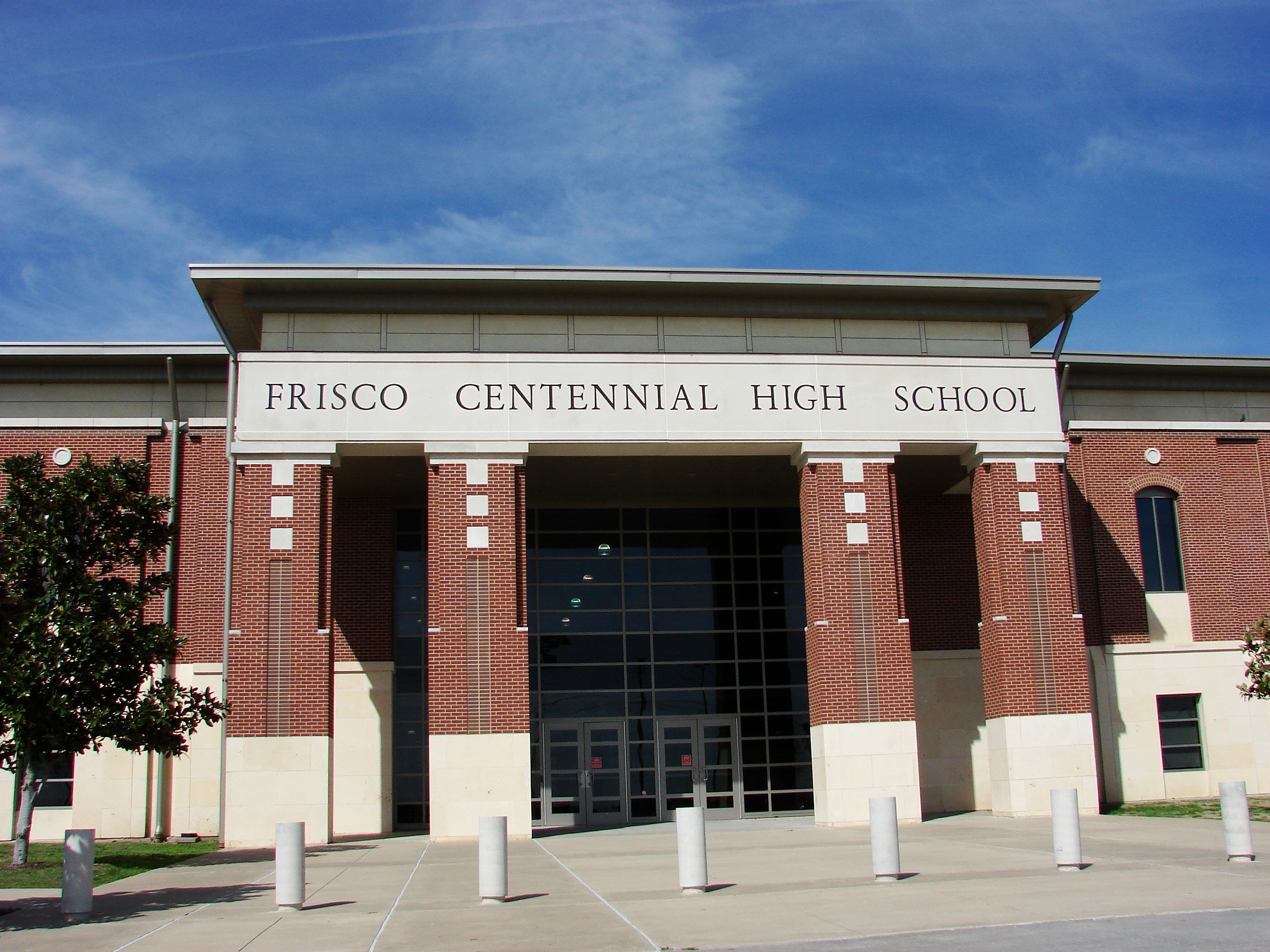

Location
- 6901 Coit Road; Frisco, Texas 75035; United States; 33.1363°N 96.7694°W

Information
- Type: Public
- Established: 2003
- School district: Frisco Independent School District
- Principal: Kiara Henderson
- Teaching staff: 131.68 (on FTE basis)
- Grades: 9–12
- Enrollment: 2,035 (2023–24)
- Student to teacher ratio: 15.45
- Colors: Red and blue
- Athletics conference: UIL Class 5A
- Mascot: Titans
- Rival: Liberty High School (Frisco, Texas)
- Yearbook: Titan Pride Yearbook
- Website: https://www.friscoisd.org/o/chs

Frisco Centennial High School (commonly referred to as Centennial High School), is one of twelve public high schools in the Frisco Independent School District in Frisco, Texas, United States. It serves grades nine through twelve. In 2022, the school was rated "A" by the Texas Education Agency.

== History ==
The school opened in the fall of 2003, initially to serve 9th and 10th graders. It was the second to open in the district, after Frisco High School. At the time, the school served all of the school district's area east of Preston Road as well as portions of north Plano and western McKinney. The first graduating class from the high school graduated in spring 2006.

The school's enrollment grew quickly, fueled by Frisco's record growth. As early as 2006–07, Centennial had exceeded its capacity of 1,800 students, and in the fall of 2006 Liberty High School was opened to help relieve this overcrowding. Despite the addition of several new wings and classrooms during the 2011–12 school year which brought total capacity to 2,100 students, Centennial became overcrowded once again, peaking at an enrollment of 2,190 in 2013–14. In compliance with the district's policy of keeping school sizes small, a portion of the school's attendance zone was allocated to that of Independence High School in 2014. In the fall of 2016, the opening of the district's ninth high school, Lebanon Trail High School, further lowered enrollment at Centennial. The school's attendance zone is currently built up.

On April 2, 2025, at a Frisco Independent School District stadium, Karmelo Anthony, a Centennial High School student, was sitting in an opposing teams section during the District 11-5A track and field championships. After being asked to leave the section by Austin Metcalf, he fatally stabbed Austin Metcalf. He was arrested and charged with first-degree murder.

== Demographics ==
As of the 24-25 school year, there are a total of 2,035 students enrolled at Centennial High School. Of the students enrolled, 55% of students are Asian, 25.5% are White, 8.8% are Hispanic/Latino, 6.7% are African American, 0.44% are American Indian/Alaskan Native, and 3.6% are Multiracial. 9.8% of students at Centennial High School are eligible for free or reduced lunches.

== Athletics ==
The Centennial Titans compete in the following sports:

- Baseball
- Basketball
- Cross country
- Drill Team (Centennial Sweethearts)
- Football – earned first state playoff berth in 2008
- Golf
- Powerlifting
- Soccer – 2016 UIL State 5A Champions
- Softball
- Swimming and diving
- Tennis – 2024 UIL State 5A Boys Doubles Champions; 2024 UIL State 5A Champions, 2025 UIL State 5A Champions, 2026 UIL State 5A Champions
- Track and field
- Volleyball
- Wrestling – 2014 Dual State Champions; 2014 UIL State Champions; 2015 Dual State Champions; 2015 UIL State Champions; 2016 Dual State Finalist; 2016 UIL Runner-up, 2020 Dual State Championship

== Academics ==
Centennial High School has gotten back to back exemplary rankings every year from 2009 to 2012, and is the only school in its category to get such rankings. At present, the school is still rated "Exemplary" by the Texas Education Agency. Students at Centennial scored an average of 1202 on the SAT and 27.6 on the ACT as of 2025. Centennial High Schools had 23 National Merit Finalists in 2024, as well as 41 students commended for National Merit. Centennial students took a total of 3,712 AP Tests in the 2024-2025 School Year, with 89% of them scoring a 3 or higher score.

== Notable alumni ==
- Seth Elledge (2014), MLB pitcher for the St. Louis Cardinals
- Brett Eskildsen (2024), college football wide receiver for the Iowa State Cyclones
- Lamar Jordan (2013), wide receiver in the German Football League
- Delaney Miller (2013), professional rock climber
- Ranthony Texada (2013), former defensive back in the NFL, CFL, and XFL
- Karmelo Anthony (2025), Murderer of Austin Metcalf
