= Frisco Independent School District =

School district in Texas, United States

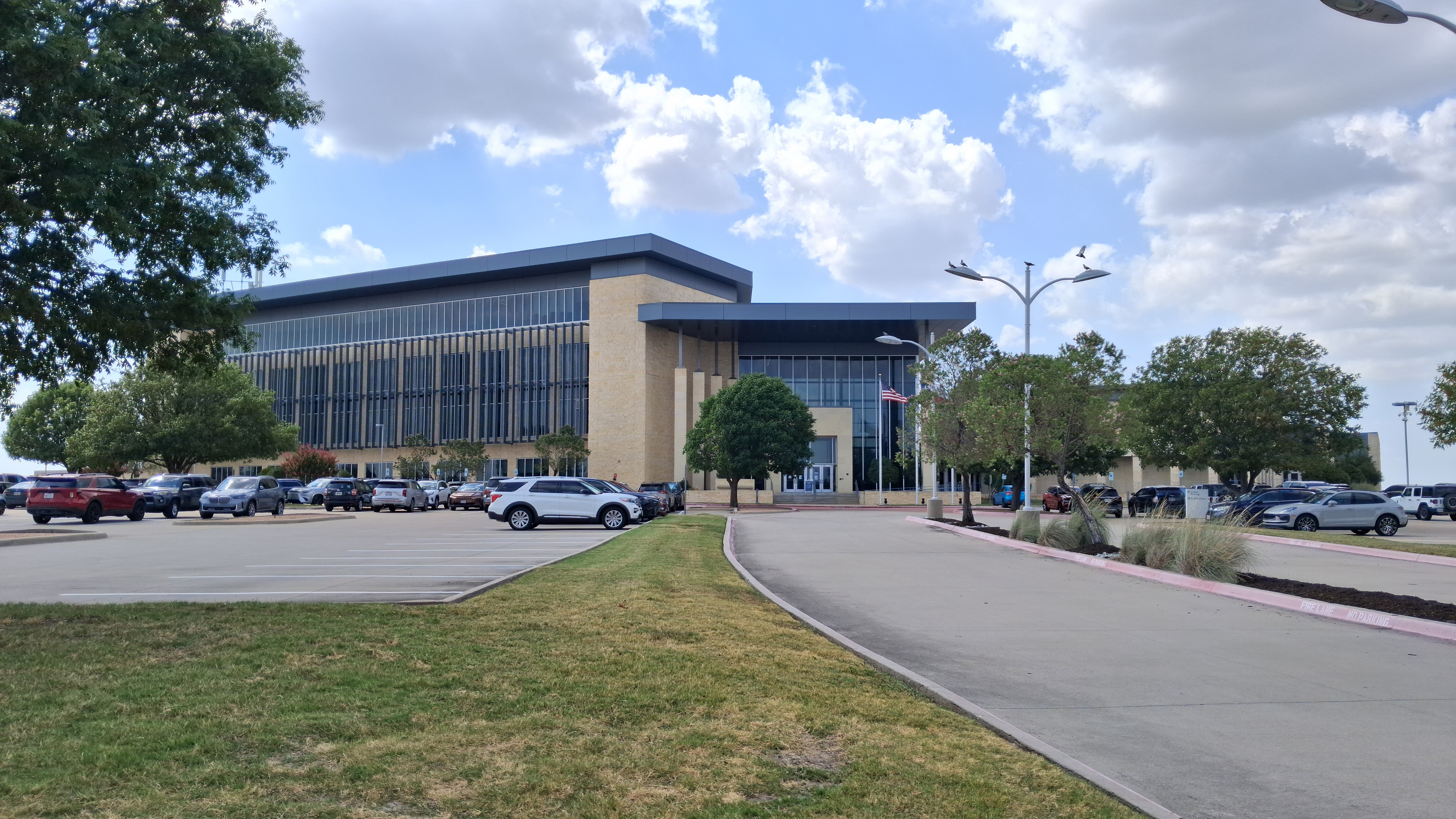

Address
- 5515 Ohio Drive Frisco, Texas, USA ESC Region 10
- Coordinates: 33°7′29″N 96°47′58″W

District information
- Type: Independent School District
- Motto: Our mission is to know every student by name and need.
- Grades: PK-12
- Established: January 6, 1903; 123 years ago
- Superintendent: Dr. Todd Fouche
- Governing agency: Texas Education Agency
- Schools: 77 Total Schools: 12 High; 17 Middle; 1 Intermediate; 43 Elementary; 4 Special Programs
- NCES District ID: 4820010

Students and staff
- Students: 62,713 (2025-26)

Other information
- Website: www.friscoisd.org

Administrative Annex

Frisco Independent School District (Frisco ISD or FISD) is a public school district based in Frisco, Texas, United States. Covering approximately 75 square miles in Collin and Denton counties, the district portions of the cities of Frisco, Little Elm, McKinney, Plano, Prosper, and The Colony as well as unincorporated land.

The district was originally formed in 1876 and was known as the Farmers School District. Small schoolhouses served the rural population at that time. The community of Frisco began to emerge in 1902 and the school district was renamed.

The district is one of the largest in Texas and the nation. In 1995, Frisco ISD had four schools. Since then, the district has added 71 new schools, opening two to six campuses annually. No public school district in the country grew faster from 1990–91 to 2010–11, according to the National Center for Education Statistics.

The school district owns three stadiums that it uses for football games: David Kuykendall Stadium, Ford Center at The Star and Toyota Stadium.

== Academic Achievement ==
In 2022, the school district was one of the best in the state, receiving the highest Texas Accountability rating of "A". In 2025-26, the school district celebrated another school rated A, including State student achievement 92%, School progress 83%, and closing the Gaps 90%.

== Board of Trustees ==
Frisco ISD Board of Trustees

- Keith Maddox - President, Place 7
- Stephanie Elad - Vice-President, Place 3
- Dynette Davis - Secretary, Place 4
- Renee Sample - Parliamentarian, Place 2
- Suresh Manduva - Place 1
- Sherrie Salas - Place 6
- Misty Wamhoff - Place 5

== District Leadership ==
Office of the Superintendent

- Todd Fouche - Superintendent of Schools
- Michelle Arellano - Assistant to the Superintendent, Deputy Superintendent and Board of Trustees

Administration (Instructional Support Team)

- Cory McClendon - Deputy Superintendent of Schools
- Wes Cunningham - Associate Deputy Superintendent
- Pamela Linton - Chief Human Resources Officer
- Nicole Lyons - Chief Communications Officer
- Cheryl McDonald - Chief Technology Officer
- Christy Fiori - Chief Leadership and Student Services Officer
- Kimberly Smith - Deputy Superintendent of Business and Operations
- Scott Warstler - Chief Operations Officer
- Garrett Jackson - Chief Specialized Learning Services Officer

== Boundary ==
The jurisdiction of the Frisco Independent School District spans 2 counties, Collin and Denton, serving 5 cities and unincorporated areas.

Collin County: sections of Frisco, McKinney, and Plano.

Denton County: sections of Frisco, Little Elm, Prosper, and a parcel of The Colony as well as some unincorporated areas.

== Demographics ==
=== Students ===
Schools Enrollment October 31, 2025
Schools	Numbers
Elementary	24,968
Middle	15,323
High	22,464
Total	62,755

Frisco ISD Ethnicity Data October 31, 2025
Ethnicity	Percent
White	25.8%
Asian	45.02%
Hispanic	12.63%
African American	10.43%
American Indian	0.68%
Pacific Islander	0.06%
Two or More Races	5.39%

==== Other Demographics October 31, 2025 ====
- Four-Year Graduation Rate: 95.2%
- Economically Disadvantaged: 14.13%
- Languages Served: 88
- Emergent Bilingual: 12.7%
- Gifted and Talented: 13.8%
- Special Education: 13.03%

=== Teaching Staff October 25, 2024 ===
- Teachers: 4,595
- Average Teaching Experience: 10.6 years
- Average Teaching Experience in FISD: 5.7 years
- Teachers with More Than 6 Years of Experience: 65%
- Staff with Advanced Degrees: 30.48%

== Schools ==
Frisco ISD operates 77 schools: 12 high schools, 17 middle schools, 1 intermediate school, 43 elementary schools, and 3 special program centers. As of October 27, 2023, there are 28,265 elementary school students, 16,079 middle school students, and 22,357 high school students enrolled in the school district. The district opens an average of 1-4 new schools per school year.

High schools (grades 9-12)
Name	Established	Mascot	Colors	Location	Additional information
Centennial High School	2003	Titans	Blue & Red	Frisco	
Emerson High School	2021	Mavericks	Navy & Columbia Blue	McKinney	Serves portions of McKinney
Frisco High School	1902	Raccoons	Blue & Yellow	Frisco	Locally known as "The Original" High School; Current location built in 1996
Heritage High School	2009	Coyotes	Maroon & Vegas Gold	Frisco	Serves portions of McKinney
Independence High School	2014	Knights	Purple & Black	Frisco	
Lebanon Trail High School	2016	Trail Blazers	Green & Gold	Frisco	Serves portions of Plano
Liberty High School	2006	Redhawks	Red & Black	Frisco	Serves portion of Plano
Lone Star High School	2010	Rangers	Navy & Silver	Frisco	Serves portions of Little Elm
Memorial High School	2018	Warriors	Black & Gold	Frisco	
Reedy High School	2015	Lions	Green & Blue	Frisco	
Panther Creek High School	2022	Panthers	Teal & Black	Frisco	Serves portions of Little Elm
Wakeland High School	2006	Wolverines	Navy & Orange	Frisco	

Middle schools (grades 6-8)
School Name	Established	Mascot	Location	Additional Information
Clark Middle School	2000	Cougars	Frisco	
Cobb Middle School	2010	Cyclones	Frisco	Serves portions of Little Elm
Fowler Middle School	2007	Falcons	Plano	Serves portions of Plano
Griffin Middle School	2004	Gators	Frisco	Serves portions of Little Elm
Hunt Middle School	2010	Huskies	Frisco	
Lawler Middle School	2018	Legends	Frisco	
Maus Middle School	2010	Mountain Lions	Frisco	
Nelson Middle School	2016	Nighthawks	Frisco	
Pearson Middle School	2015	Patriots	Frisco	
Pioneer Heritage Middle School	2002	Panthers	Frisco	
Roach Middle School	2005	Rams	Frisco	Serves portions of McKinney
Scoggins Middle School	2008	Seahawks	McKinney	Houses Grades 7-8; Serves portions of McKinney
Stafford Middle School	2008	Spartans	Frisco	Serves portions of Little Elm
Trent Middle School	2015	Timberwolves	Frisco	Serves portions of Little Elm
Vandeventer Middle School	2012	Vikings	Frisco	Serves portions of Plano
Wester Middle School	2002	Wildcats	Frisco	
Wilkinson Middle School	2023	Bulldogs	Frisco	Serves portions of Little Elm
Wortham Intermediate School	2023	McKinney		Houses Grades 5-6; Serves portions of McKinney

Elementary schools (grades PK-5)
School Name	Year Founded	Location	Additional Information
Allen Elementary School	2009	Frisco	
Anderson Elementary School	1999	Plano	2008 Blue Ribbon School; Serves portions of Plano
Ashley Elementary School	2005	Frisco	Serves portions of McKinney
Bledsoe Elementary School	2005	Frisco	
Boals Elementary School	2003	Frisco	Serves portions of Little Elm
Borchardt Elementary School	2001	Plano	Serves portions of Plano
Bright Academy	2001	Frisco	Formerly known as Bright Elementary; Houses International Baccalaureate (IB) Primary Years Programme.
Carroll Elementary School	2007	Frisco	
Christie Elementary School	1999	Frisco	
Comstock Elementary School	2012	McKinney	Serves portions of McKinney
Corbell Elementary School	2006	Frisco	Serves portions of Little Elm
Curtsinger Elementary School	1995	Frisco	2006 National Blue Ribbon School
Elliott Elementary School	2008	McKinney	Serves portions of McKinney
Fisher Elementary School	2001	Frisco	Serves portions of Little Elm
Gunstream Elementary School	2002	Frisco	
Hosp Elementary School	2014	Frisco	
Isbell Elementary School	2004	Frisco	
Liscano Elementary School	2018	Frisco	
McSpedden Elementary School	2014	Frisco	
Miller Elementary School	2016	Little Elm	Serves portions of Little Elm
Minett Elementary School	2022	Frisco	Serves portions of Little Elm and Prosper
Mooneyham Elementary School	2007	McKinney	
Newman Elementary School	2014	Frisco	
Nichols Elementary School	2012	Frisco	
Norris Elementary School	2015	Frisco	
Ogle Elementary School	2006	McKinney	Serves portions of McKinney
Phillips Elementary School	2012	Frisco	Serves portions of Little Elm
Pink Elementary School	2005	Frisco	
Purefoy Elementary School	2010	Frisco	Serves portions of Little Elm
Riddle Elementary School	2003	Plano	Serves portions of Plano
Robertson Elementary School	2007	Little Elm	Serves portions of Little Elm
Rogers Elementary School	1987	Frisco	
Scott Elementary School	2014	McKinney	Serves portions of McKinney
Sem Elementary School	2006	Frisco	
Shawnee Trail Elementary School	2000	Frisco	
Smith Elementary School	1997	Frisco	2006 National Blue Ribbon School; Serves portions of Plano
Sonntag Elementary School	2010	McKinney	Serves portions of McKinney
Sparks Elementary School	2002	Frisco	
Spears Elementary School	2002	Frisco	
Tadlock Elementary School	2008	Frisco	
Talley Elementary School	2018	Frisco	Serves portions of Plano
Taylor Elementary School	2006	Plano	
Vaughn Elementary School	2016	Frisco	
Wortham Intermediate School	2023	McKinney	Houses Grades 5-6; Serves portions of McKinney

Student Opportunity Center

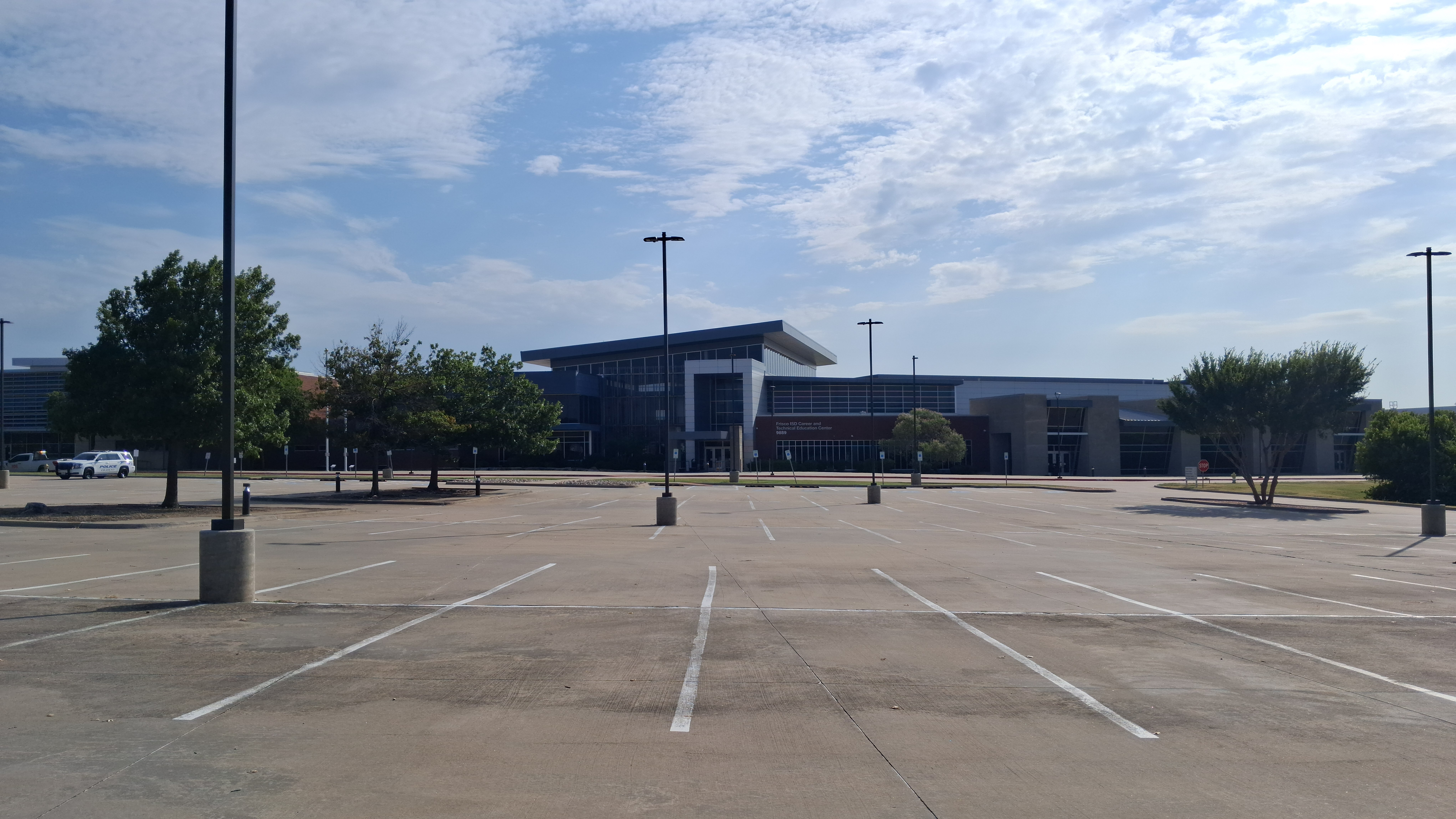
Career and Technology Education Center

Special programs
Name	Established	Additional information
Career and Technology Education Center	2008	Providing students with a variety of special classes including but not limited to culinary, law, engineering, cyber security, mechanics, medicine, etc.
Early Childhood School	2009	Provides a high-quality preschool program three and four-year-old students in Frisco ISD.
Frisco Flex High School	2026	Open to all Texas students; offers online, hybrid, and a la carte coursework
Student Opportunity Center	2000	The district's only K-12 school provides alternate education to students who are struggling academically, violate the Frisco ISD Student Code of Conduct, or have other extenuating circumstances that hinder their academic success.

Former Staley Middle School

Former schools
Name	Year opened	Year closed	Additional information
Staley Middle School	1996	2026	Former Frisco High School facility from 1973-1996.

== David Kuykendall Stadium ==
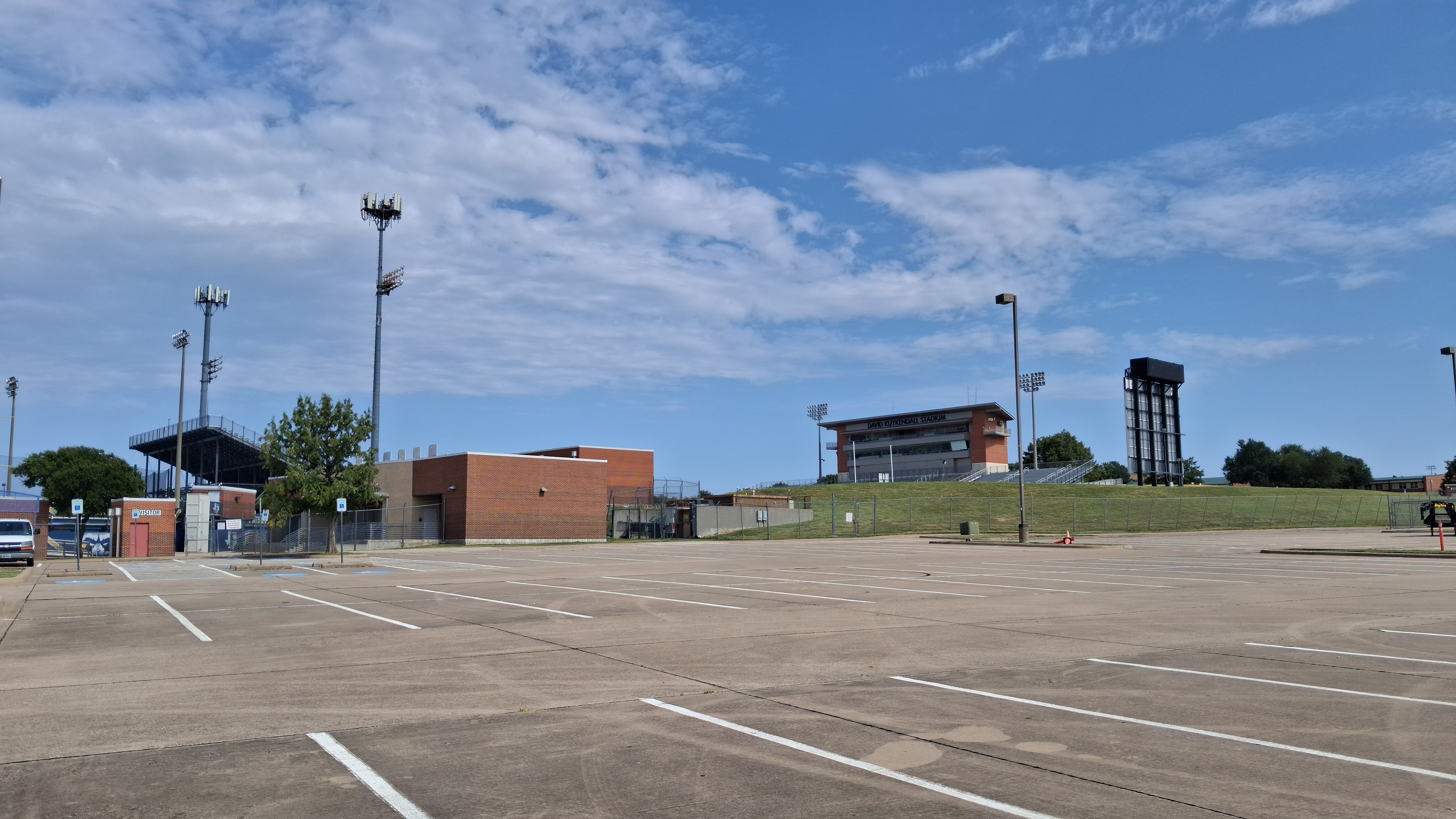
David Kuykendall Stadium

Swim Center & Athletic Offices

Bruce Eubanks Natatorium

David Kuykendall Stadium is one of three stadiums used by Frisco ISD for football games, along with the Ford Center at The Star and Toyota Stadium. The stadium is considered to be one of the oldest stadiums in Texas. The stadium, which currently has 9,000 seats and 1,200 parking spaces, is made for playing football, softball and track and field. The stadium is also used by several schools.

The stadium was built in 1986 near Staley Middle School and Bruce Eubanks Natatorium. On May 13, 2021, the District's Board of Trustees had voted change the name to honor David Kuykendall, a long-time employee and FISD's athletic director since 1999, who was retiring. The stadium also received a new video board for the purpose of improving the game-day experience.

The stadium was renovated in 2015, adding over 1,400 seats, new locker rooms, a relocated scoreboard and an expanded running track. The renovation project also included the construction of new buildings near the football stadium. The renovation cost Frisco ISD over $3.4 million dollars. In 2019, the stadium got its turf replaced, the operation took 6 months to complete. On August 2019, Frisco ISD implemented new bag policies at the stadium, as well as at Toyota Stadium. On December 9, 2024, the district's board of trustees approved $10.13 million contracts for roof replacements and technical repairs at the David Kuykendall Stadium and other stadiums.

On April 2, 2025, a track meet at the stadium was temporarily suspended after Memorial High School student Austin Metcalf was murdered by Karmelo Anthony, a Centennial High School student of the same age, who stabbed Metcalf in the chest following an altercation. On April 19, Frisco ISD said that they were seeking trespassing charges against a man who filmed himself breaking into the stadium to film a video related to the Metcalf stabbing during a protest which was held on the stadium by a group called "Protect White Americans". On June 9, 2026, Anthony was convicted of murder and sentenced to 35 years in jail.
