= Wakeland High School =

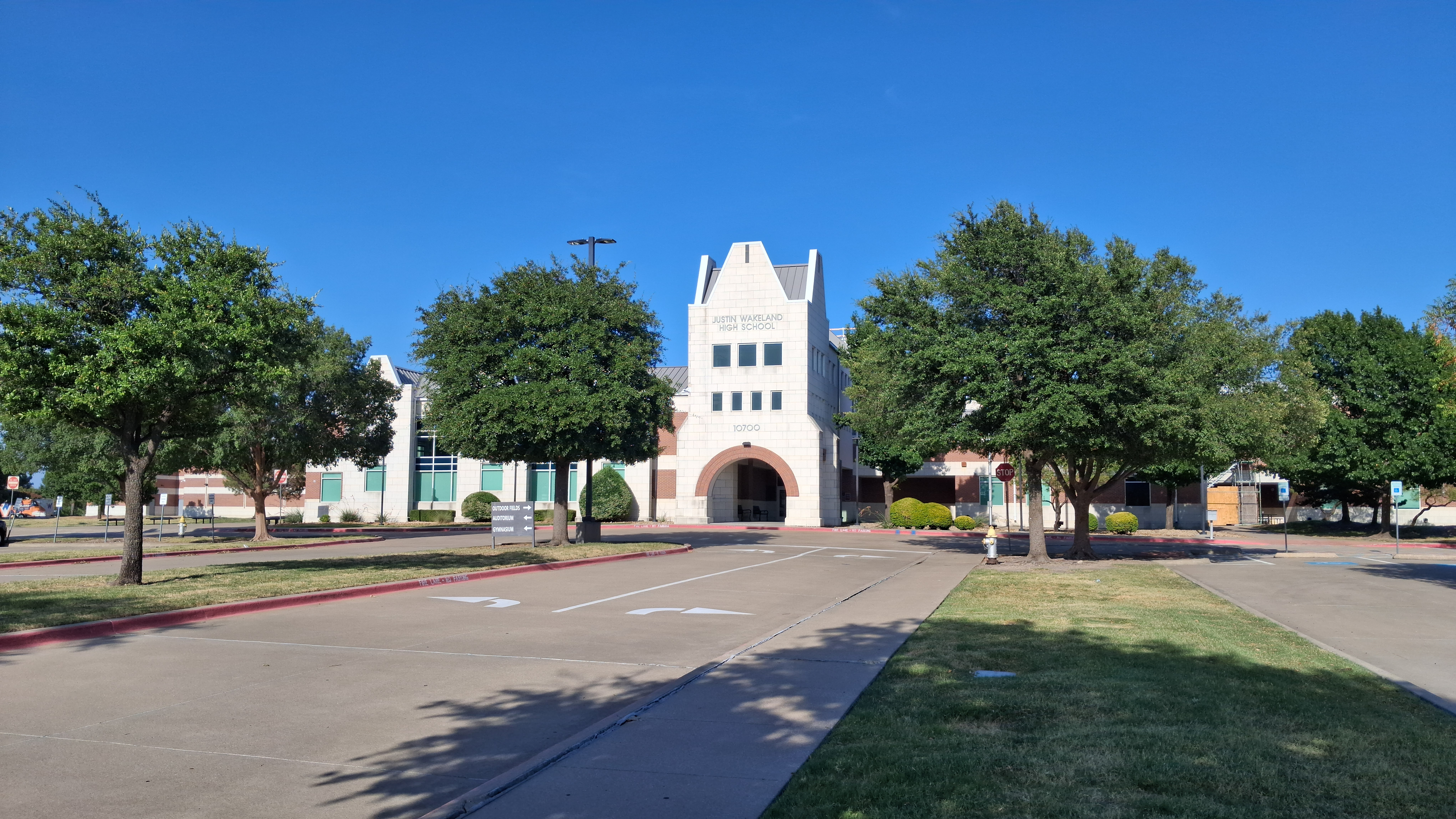

Location
- 10700 Legacy Road; Frisco, Texas 75033; United States; 33°10′03″N 96°50′46″W

Information
- School type: Public high school
- Established: 2006
- School district: Frisco Independent School District
- NCES School ID: 482001010494
- Principal: Donna Edge
- Teaching staff: 129.56 (on an FTE basis)
- Grades: 9–12
- Enrollment: 2,158 (2023–2024)
- Student to teacher ratio: 16.66
- Colors: Orange and Blue
- Athletics conference: UIL Class AAAAAA (6A)
- Mascot: Wolverines
- Newspaper: Wakeland Access
- Yearbook: The Prowler
- Website: https://www.friscoisd.org/o/whs

Justin Wakeland High School is a public high school located in Frisco, Texas, United States. It is classified as a 6A school by the University Interscholastic League (UIL). It is a part of the Frisco Independent School District, and is one of twelve district high schools. It opened on August 14, 2006. Incoming freshmen usually come from Griffin Middle School and Cobb Middle School. In 2015, the school was rated "Met Standard" by the Texas Education Agency.

== Namesake ==
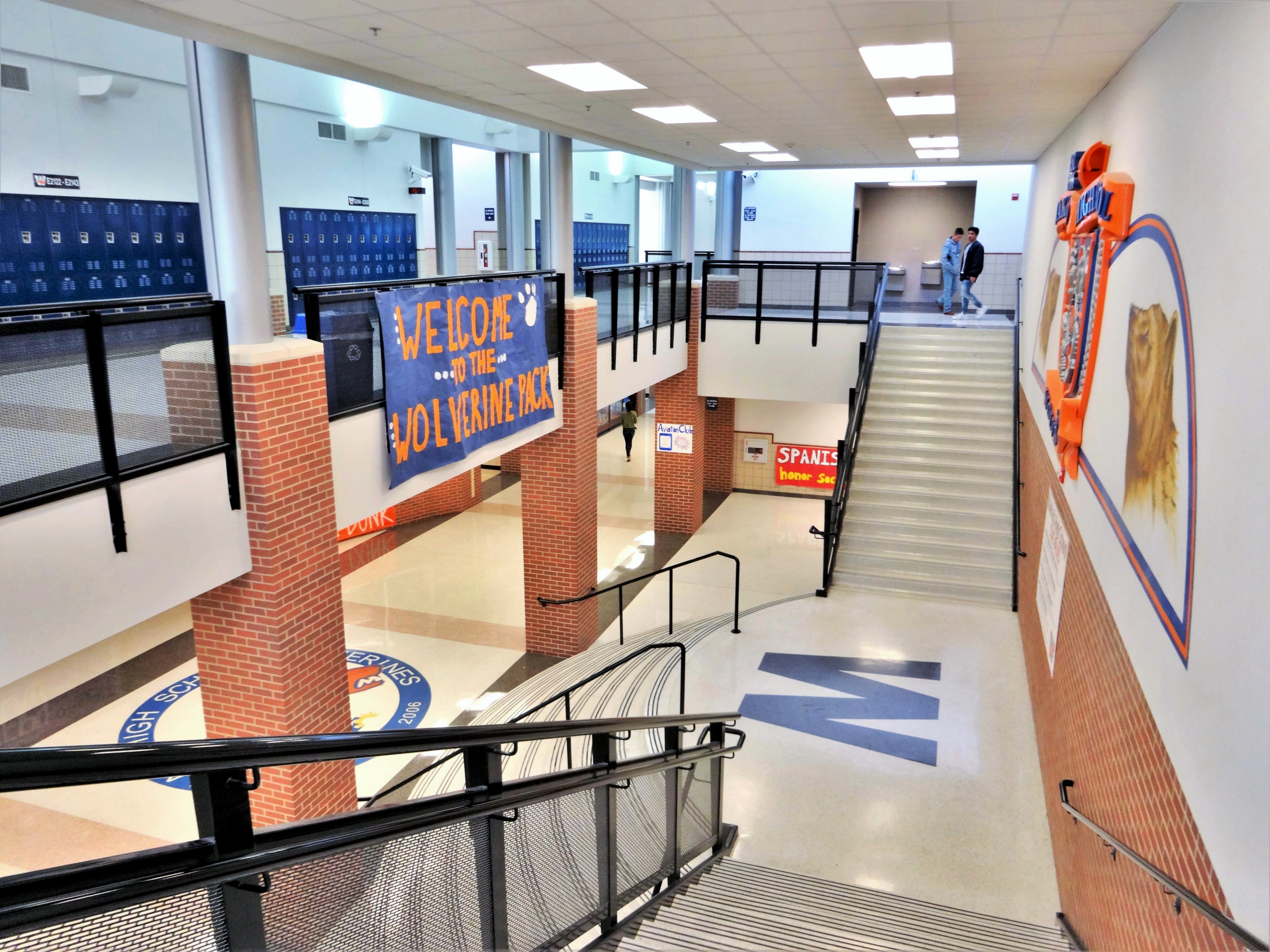
View from main staircase inside Justin Wakeland High School

The school was originally to be named Legacy High School. During construction, it was instead named for Justin Wakeland, who served as the superintendent of the Frisco ISD for 19 years from 1978 to 1997.

== Athletics and fine arts ==
- 2010, 2017, 2018, 2021, 2022 (5A) Boys' soccer state champion
- 2011, 2018, 2022, 2024 (5A) Girls' soccer state champion
- 2015 (5A) Boys' cross country state champion
- 2018 (5A) Girls' cross country state champion
- 2019, 2023, 2025 (5A) Marching Band State bronze medalist
- 2017, 2021, 2023, 2024, 2025 (5A) Marching Band Area B champion
- 2024 (5A/D2) Volleyball state champion

== Media attention ==
Marc Alan Carden, a former Wakeland coach and history teacher, was arrested and sentenced to 10 years in prison for sexually assaulting a 14 year old in 2014. The victim was a student in Frisco ISD.

== Notable alumni ==
- Ryan O'Hearn (2011), first baseman for the Baltimore Orioles
- Javante McCoy (2017 - transferred), NBA G-League player
- Gracie Brian (2019), soccer player for Dallas Trinity FC
- Skye Blakely (2023), gymnast
