= Presley =

- Pronunciation: /ˈprɛsli/
- Gender: Unisex
- Language: English

Origin
- Language: Anglo-Saxon
- Origin: Combination of preost and leah
- Meaning: habitational name for one who lived in a place named "Priest's Clearing", from Anglo-Saxon preost and leah
- Region of origin: England and Scotland

Other names
- Variant forms: Pressley; Pressly; Priestley; Priestly

Presley is a surname and given name.

== Etymology ==
The name Presley is derived from the Old English preost, meaning "priest", and leah meaning "forest clearing".

== History ==
Most instances of the surname Presley and variants Pressley and Pressly are thought to be of English origin. Later, if not found in some form originating also in Scotland, the name made its way across the border to that country, then on to Ireland and to the United States. However, some of the instances of the name in America may derive from the German surname Preslar (ultimately from Bressler, meaning 'from Breslau' (formerly in Germany, now in Poland)), as individuals in some post-colonial American records are recorded under both names.

The surname came to prominence in the person of Elvis Presley (known simply as Elvis), the American music icon, whose family, according to genealogists, has come from the German town of Neuhochstadt in Palatinate, via a certain Johannes Valentin Preslar that emigrated with his sons to North Carolina in the early 1700s.

In the United States and Australia, however, Presley is often an Anglicized form of German surnames such as Preslar and Presler. This is thought to be a habitational name from Breslau, Poland. Former President Jimmy Carter, through his mother, is thought to descend from Johann Valentin Preslar/Presler, who along with his family reached America and later the then frontier area of the central Carolinas sometime during the mid-18th century. Elvis Presley may have had the same ancestor.

Today, Presley ranks as the 1,825 most common surname in the United States.

== People with the surname ==
- Aeman Presley (born 1980), American serial killer
- Alex Presley (born 1985), American baseball player
- Angaleena Presley (born 1976), American country music singer-songwriter
- Annette Presley (born 1964), New Zealand businesswoman
- Bob Presley (1946–1975), American basketball player
- Brandon Presley (born 1977), American politician
- Brennan Presley (born 2002), American football player
- Brian Presley (born 1977), American actor
- Connor Presley (born 1998), American soccer player
- De'Andre Presley (born 1990), American football player
- Elvis Presley (1935–1977), American singer
- Erin Hershey Presley (born 1976), American actress
- Gerald Presley (1942–2024), Canadian bobsledder
- Gladys Presley (1912–1958), Elvis Presley's mother
- Hal Presley (born 2003), American football player
- Harold Ray Presley (1948–2001), American law enforcement officer
- Harriette Estelle Harris Presley (1862–1885), American missionary in Liberia
- Hovis Presley (1960–2005), English comedian
- Jenna Presley (born 1987), American porn star
- Jim Presley (born 1961), American baseball player
- John J. Presley, British musician
- Leo Presley (1922–1975), American footballer
- Lisa Marie Presley (1968–2023), American singer-songwriter, Elvis Presley's daughter
- Luther G. Presley (1887–1974), American songwriter and musician
- Mike Presley (born 1953), American football player
- Pat Presley (1935–2002), Canadian ice hockey player
- Priscilla Presley (born 1945), Elvis Presley's ex-wife
- Raeanne Presley, American politician
- Ralph Presley (1930–2022), American politician
- Randall Presley (1919–2012), American real estate developer
- Reg Presley (1941–2013), English singer-songwriter
- Robert B. Presley (1924–2018), American politician
- Sam Davis Presley (1918–1942), American sailor
- Sharon Presley (1943–2022), American activist
- Steve Presley (born 1957), English rugby league footballer and referee
- Tim Presley, American musician, singer and songwriter
- Vernon Presley (1916–1979), Elvis Presley's father
- Wayman Presley (1896–1990), American mail carrier, entrepreneur, and humanitarian
- Wayne Presley (born 1965), American ice hockey player

== Variants of the surname ==
- Aaron Pressley (born 2001), Scottish footballer
- Anne Pressly (1982–2008), murdered KATV anchorwoman
- Ayanna Pressley (born 1974), American politician
- Babe Pressley (1916–1965), American basketball player
- Buck Pressly (1886–1954), American baseball player, manager, and physician
- Butch Pressley (born 1941), American football player
- Caleb Pressley (born 1992), American blogger, podcaster, comedian, and football player
- Charles Pressly (1794–1880), English civil servant
- Chris Pressley (born 1986), American football player
- Clint Pressley (born 1969), American evangelical pastor
- Coleman Pressley (born 1988), American stock car racing driver
- DeMario Pressley (born 1985), American football player
- Dominic Pressley (1964–1997), American basketball player
- Ebenezer Erskine Pressly (1808–1860), American pastor and academic
- Eleanor C. Pressly (1918–2003), American mathematician and aeronautical engineer
- G. Michael Pressley (1951–2006), American educational psychologist
- Jaime Pressly (born 1977), American actress
- Janet Pressley, American singer/songwriter
- James Pressly Sr. (1907–2002), American tennis player and coach
- Jhurell Pressley (born 1992), American football player
- John G. Pressley (1833–1895), American lawyer, judge, and American Civil War lieutenant colonel
- Harold Pressley (born 1963), American basketball player
- Henry Roosevelt Pressley (1945–2005), blues and soul instrumentalist
- O. K. Pressley (1907–1984), American football player and soldier
- Robert Pressley (born 1959), NASCAR driver
- Ryan Pressly (born 1988), American baseball player
- Steven Pressley (born 1973), Scottish footballer
- Thomas Pressley, African-American South Carolina state legislator
- Thomas Pressly, Louisiana attorney and politician
- Toni Pressley (born 1990), American soccer player

== People with the given name ==
- Presley Carson (1968–2024), retired Honduran football player
- Presley Cash (born 1997), American musician and actress
- Presley Cassell (born 2006), English rugby league footballer
- Presley Chweneyagae (1984–2025), South African actor
- Presley Ewing (1822–1854), American politician
- Presley Gerber (1999–2026), American model
- Presley T. Glass (1824–1902), American politician
- Presley Groves (1841–1915), American lawyer and politician
- Presley Neville (1755–1818), American military officer
- Presley O'Bannon (1776–1850), American soldier
- Presley Marion Rixey (1852–1928), American physician
- Presley Sorah (born 2003), American stock car racing driver
- Presley Spruance (1785–1863), American merchant
- Presley Tanita Tucker (born 1989), daughter of Tanya Tucker and Ben Reed
- Presley Thornton (1721–1769), American planter and politician
- Presley Merritt Wagoner, American clubwoman who served as the President General of the Daughters of the American Revolution from 2005 to 2007
- Presley Norton Yoder (1932–1993), Ecuadorian archaeologist and entrepreneur
- Presley Smith (born 2003), United States badminton player

== Variants of the given name ==
- Pressley Blake (born 1936), Canadian football player
- Priestley Farquharson (born 1997), English footballer
- Pressley Harvin III (born 1998), American football player
- Pressly Matthews (1903–1967), New Zealand politician
- Priestly H. McBride (1796–1869), American justice
- Priestley Swain (1881–1949), English bishop
