= Myatt Township, Howell County, Missouri =

Township in Howell County, Missouri, U.S.

Coordinates: 36.5519°N 91.7431°W

Myatt Township is an inactive township in Howell County, in the U.S. state of Missouri.

Myatt Township takes its name from Myatt Creek.

South Fork Spring River, Anthony Branch, Clifton Branch, Nail Creek and Presley Branch also flow through the township.
