= Presley (disambiguation) =

Presley may refer to:

- Elvis Presley, American singer and actor (1935-1977)
- Presley (also variants Pressley and Pressly), a surname and given name
- Presley Branch, a stream in the U.S. states of Arkansas and Missouri
- USS Presley (DE-371), was a John C. Butler-class destroyer escort acquired by the U.S. Navy during World War II
- Presley, a pet male Spix's macaw that was repatriated to Brazil from the United States in 2002
