= 2023 Wyoming Cowboys football team =

American college football season

2023 Wyoming Cowboys football

Arizona Bowl champion

Arizona Bowl, W 16–15 vs. Toledo
- Conference: Mountain West Conference
- Record: 9–4 (5–3 MW)
- Head coach: Craig Bohl (10th season)
- Offensive coordinator: Tim Polasek (3rd season)
- Offensive scheme: Pro-style, West Coast
- Defensive coordinator: Jay Sawvel (4th season)
- Base defense: 4–3
- Home stadium: War Memorial Stadium

2023 Mountain West Conference football standings
	Conf.			Overall
Team	W		L	W		L
UNLV y	6	–	2	9	–	5
Boise State y$	6	–	2	8	–	6
San Jose State	6	–	2	7	–	6
Air Force	5	–	3	9	–	4
Wyoming	5	–	3	9	–	4
Fresno State	4	–	4	9	–	4
Utah State	4	–	4	6	–	7
Hawaii	3	–	5	5	–	8
Colorado State	3	–	5	5	–	7
Nevada	2	–	6	2	–	10
New Mexico	2	–	6	4	–	8
San Diego State	2	–	6	4	–	8
Championship: Boise State 44, UNLV 20
$ – Conference champion; y – Championship game participant

The 2023 Wyoming Cowboys football team represented the University of Wyoming as a member Mountain West Conference (MW) during the 2023 NCAA Division I FBS football season. Led by Craig Bohl in his tenth and final season as head coach, the Cowboys compiled an overall record of 9–4 record with mark 5–3 in conference play, tying for fourth place in the MW. Wyoming was invited to the Arizona Bowl, where the Cowboys defeated Toledo. The team played home games at War Memorial Stadium in Laramie, Wyoming.

On December 6, Bohl announced that would retire following the season. Wyoming an average home attendance of 23,163 in 2023.

== Schedule ==
Date	Time	Opponent	Site	TV	Result	Attendance
September 2	6:50 p.m. (Note: Kickoff was originally scheduled for 5:30 p.m. MDT, but was delayed until 6:50 p.m. due to lightning in the Laramie area.)	Texas Tech*	War Memorial Stadium; Laramie, WY	CBS	W 35–33 ^{2OT}	26,450
September 9	2:00 p.m.	Portland State*	War Memorial Stadium; Laramie, WY	MW Network	W 31–17	22,121
September 16	6:00 p.m.	at No. 4 Texas*	Darrell K Royal–Texas Memorial Stadium; Austin, TX	LHN	L 10–31	101,777
September 23	5:00 p.m.	Appalachian State*	War Memorial Stadium; Laramie, WY	CBSSN	W 22–19	21,169
September 30	2:00 p.m.	New Mexico^{†}	War Memorial Stadium; Laramie, WY	MW Network	W 35–26	25,477
October 7	6:00 p.m.	No. 24 Fresno State	War Memorial Stadium; Laramie, WY	FOX	W 24–19	20,788
October 14	5:00 p.m.	at Air Force	Falcon Stadium; Colorado Springs, CO	CBSSN	L 27–34	28,311
October 28	3:30 p.m.	at Boise State	Albertsons Stadium; Boise, ID	FS2	L 7–32	35,189
November 3	6:00 p.m.	Colorado State	War Memorial Stadium; Laramie, WY (Border War)	CBSSN	W 24–15	27,905
November 10	8:45 p.m.	at UNLV	Allegiant Stadium; Paradise, NV	FS1	L 14–34	25,568
November 18	12:00 p.m.	Hawaii	War Memorial Stadium; Laramie, WY (rivalry)	SPEC PPV, MW Network	W 42–9	18,233
November 25	7:00 p.m.	at Nevada	Mackay Stadium; Reno, NV	CBSSN	W 42–6	12,044
December 30	2:30 p.m.	vs. Toledo*	Arizona Stadium; Tucson, Arizona (Arizona Bowl)	Barstool Sports, The CW	W 16–15	30,428
*Non-conference game; ^{†}Homecoming; Rankings from AP Poll (and CFP Rankings, after November 7) - Released prior to game; All times are in Mountain time

== Preseason ==
=== Preseason media poll ===
In the Mountain West preseason media poll, Wyoming was picked to finish sixth in the conference.

=== Preseason All Mountain West teams ===
Position	Player	Class
Offense
OL	Frank Crum	Sr.
Defense
DL	Jordan Bertagnole	Jr.
DL	DeVonne Harris	Jr.
LB	Easton Gibbs	Jr.
Specialists
PK	John Hoyland	Jr.

=== Award watch lists ===
Award	Player	Position	Year
Ray Guy Award	Clayton Stewart	P	Sr.
Lou Groza Award	John Hoyland	PK	Jr.
Bronko Nagurski Trophy	Easton Gibbs	LB	Jr.
Outland Trophy	Jordan Bertagnole	DT	Jr.
Chuck Bednarik Award	Easton Gibbs	LB	Jr.
Butkus Award	Easton Gibbs	LB	Jr.

== Game summaries ==
=== Texas Tech ===
Texas Tech Red Raiders at Wyoming Cowboys – Game summary

Quarter	1	2	3	4	OT	2OT	Total
Red Raiders	17	0	0	3	7	6	33
Cowboys	0	10	7	3	7	8	35

at War Memorial Stadium, Laramie, Wyoming

- Date: September 2
- Game time: 6:50 p.m. MDT
- Game weather: Cloudy, 72 °F (22 °C)
- Game attendance: 26,450
- Referee: Stephen Baron
- TV announcers (CBS): Rich Waltz, Aaron Taylor, and Amanda Guerra
- Box score, Recap

Game information

First quarter

- TTU – Myles Price 33-yard pass from Tyler Shough (Gino Garcia kick), 10:34. Red Raiders 7–0. Drive: 6 plays, 76 yards, 1:49.
- TTU – Jayden York 19-yard pass from Tyler Shough (Gino Garcia kick), 9:25. Red Raiders 14–0. Drive: 2 plays, 26 yards, 0:42.
- TTU – Gino Garcia 54-yard field goal, 4:02. Red Raiders 17–0. Drive: 4 plays, -4 yards, 1:10.

Second quarter

- WYO – John Hoyland 56-yard field goal, 14:55. Red Raiders 17–3. Drive: 9 plays, 37 yards, 4:07.
- WYO – Caleb Driskell 4-yard pass from Andrew Peasley (John Hoyland kick), 11:20. Red Raiders 17–10. Drive: 5 plays, 56 yards, 2:30.

Third quarter

- WYO – Sam Scott 16-yard run (John Hoyland kick), 5:37. Tied 17–17. Drive: 13 plays, 76 yards, 7:31.

Fourth quarter

- WYO – John Hoyland 31-yard field goal, 8:58. Cowboys 20–17. Drive: 14 plays, 65 yards, 6:14.
- TTU – Gino Garcia 27-yard field goal, 0:41. Tied 20–20. Drive: 13 plays, 69 yards, 2:58.

Overtime

- WYO – Andrew Peasley 5-yard run (John Hoyland kick). Cowboys 27–20. Drive: 5 plays, 25 yards.
- TTU – Tahj Brooks 1-yard run (Gino Garcia kick). Tied 27–27. Drive: 5 plays, 25 yards.

Second overtime

- TTU – Jerand Bradley 15-yard pass from Tyler Shough (pass failed). Red Raiders 33–27. Drive: 5 plays, 25 yards.
- WYO – John-Michael Gyllenborg 11-yard pass from Andrew Peasley (Sam Scott run). Cowboys 35–33. Drive: 6 plays, 25 yards.

Top passers

- TTU – Tyler Shough – 31/47, 338 yards, 3 TD, INT
- WYO – Andrew Peasley – 18/34, 149 yards, 2 TD

Top rushers

- TTU – Tahj Brooks – 11 rushes, 39 yards, TD
- WYO – Andrew Peasley – 15 rushes, 68 yards, TD

Top receivers

- TTU – Jerand Bradley – 8 receptions, 88 yards, TD
- WYO – John-Michael Gyllenborg – 5 receptions, 37 yards, TD

=== Portland State ===
Portland State Vikings at Wyoming Cowboys – Game summary

Quarter	1	2	3	4	Total
Vikings	0	10	0	7	17
Cowboys	14	7	10	0	31

at War Memorial Stadium, Laramie, Wyoming

- Date: September 9
- Game time: 2:00 p.m. MDT
- Game weather: Sunny, 75 °F (24 °C)
- Game attendance: 22,121
- Referee: Christian Watson
- TV announcers (Mountain West Network): Chris Sylvester, Jared Petrino, and Bridget Howard
- Box score, Recap

Game information

First quarter

- WYO – Jamari Ferrell 1-yard run (John Hoyland kick), 8:03. Cowboys 7–0. Drive: 5 plays, 34 yards, 2:15.
- WYO – Ayir Asante 64-yard pass from Andrew Peasley (John Hoyland kick), 2:51. Cowboys 14–0. Drive: 3 plays, 67 yards, 1:28.

Second quarter

- PSU – Dante Chachere 2-yard run (Gianni Smith kick), 8:50. Cowboys 14–7. Drive: 18 plays, 75 yards, 9:01.
- WYO – Wyatt Wieland 29-yard pass from Andrew Peasley (John Hoyland kick), 4:52. Cowboys 21–7. Drive: 3 plays, 49 yards, 1:28.
- PSU – Gianni Smith 45-yard field goal, 0:16. Cowboys 21–10. Drive: 5 plays, 17 yards, 0:33.

Third quarter

- WYO – John Hoyland 56-yard field goal, 6:42. Cowboys 24–10. Drive: 11 plays, 41 yards, 5:54.
- WYO – Ayir Asante 14-yard pass from Andrew Peasley (John Hoyland kick), 1:55. Cowboys 31–10. Drive: 7 plays, 67 yards, 3:21.

Fourth quarter

- PSU – Maclaine Griffin 10-yard pass from Dante Chachere (Gianni Smith kick), 7:03. Cowboys 31–17. Drive: 11 plays, 54 yards, 5:18.

Top passers

- PSU – Dante Chachere – 22/38, 214 yards, TD, INT
- WYO – Andrew Peasley – 11/16, 201 yards, 3 TD, INT

Top rushers

- PSU – Quincy Craig – 12 rushes, 54 yards
- WYO – Sam Scott – 11 rushes, 70 yards

Top receivers

- PSU – Jermaine Braddock – 7 receptions, 61 yards
- WYO – Ayir Asante – 2 receptions, 78 yards, 2 TD

=== at No. 4 Texas ===
Wyoming Cowboys at #4 Texas Longhorns – Game summary

Quarter	1	2	3	4	Total
Cowboys	7	0	3	0	10
#4 Longhorns	3	7	0	21	31

at Darrell K Royal–Texas Memorial Stadium, Austin, Texas

- Date: September 16
- Game time: 6:15 p.m. MDT
- Game weather: Sunny, 81 °F (27 °C)
- Game attendance: 101,777
- Referee: Kevin Mar
- TV announcers (Longhorn Network): Lowell Galindo, Fozzy Whittaker, and Morgan Uber
- Box score, Recap

Game information

First quarter

- WYO – Harrison Waylee 62-yard run (John Hoyland kick), 12:45. Cowboys 7–0. Drive: 5 plays, 75 yards, 2:15.
- TEX – Bert Auburn 37-yard field goal, 9:46. Cowboys 7–3. Drive: 5 plays, 19 yards, 1:27.

Second quarter

- TEX – Byron Murphy II 1-yard pass from Quinn Ewers (Bert Auburn kick), 11:45. Longhorns 10–7. Drive: 17 plays, 90 yards, 8:03.

Third quarter

- WYO – John Hoyland 36-yard field goal, 0:20. Tied 10–10. Drive: 17 plays, 77 yards, 10:22.

Fourth quarter

- TEX – Xavier Worthy 44-yard pass from Quinn Ewers (Bert Auburn kick), 14:12. Longhorns 17–10. Drive: 4 plays, 75 yards, 1:01.
- TEX – Quinn Ewers 5-yard run (Bert Auburn kick), 9:01. Longhorns 24–10. Drive: 6 plays, 75 yards, 2:54.
- TEX – Jerrin Thompson 27-yard interception return (Bert Auburn kick), 8:46. Longhorns 31–10.

Top passers

- WYO – Evan Svoboda – 17/28, 136 yards, INT
- TEX – Quinn Ewers – 11/21, 131 yards, 2 TD

Top rushers

- WYO – Harrison Waylee – 18 rushes, 110 yards, TD
- TEX – Jonathon Brooks – 21 rushes, 164 yards

Top receivers

- WYO – Wyatt Wieland – 8 receptions, 62 yards
- TEX – Xavier Worthy – 4 receptions, 56 yards, 1 TD

=== Appalachian State ===
Appalachian State Mountaineers at Wyoming Cowboys – Game summary

Quarter	1	2	3	4	Total
Mountaineers	6	6	0	7	19
Cowboys	0	7	0	15	22

at War Memorial Stadium, Laramie, Wyoming

- Date: September 23
- Game time: 5:02 p.m. MDT
- Game weather: Sunny, 61 °F (16 °C)
- Game attendance: 21,169
- Referee: Cal McNeill
- TV announcers (CBS Sports Network): Carter Blackburn, Randy Cross, and Emily Proud
- Box score, Recap

Game information

First quarter

- APP – Michael Hughes 25-yard field goal, 10:41. Mountaineers 3–0. Drive: 12 plays, 67 yards, 4:19.
- APP – Michael Hughes 28-yard field goal, 3:00. Mountaineers 6–0. Drive: 12 plays, 87 yards, 5:33.

Second quarter

- WYO – Andrew Peasley 9-yard run (John Hoyland kick), 12:28. Cowboys 7–6. Drive: 5 plays, 26 yards, 2:13.
- APP – Michael Hughes 20-yard field goal, 1:09. Mountaineers 9–7. Drive: 14 plays, 87 yards, 6:31.
- APP – Michael Hughes 50-yard field goal, 0:00. Mountaineers 12–7. Drive: 3 plays, 18 yards, 0:15.

Fourth quarter

- APP – Tyrek Funderburk 18-yard interception return (Michael Hughes kick), 11:42. Mountaineers 19–7.
- WYO – Harrison Waylee 75-yard run (John Hoyland kick), 11:31. Mountaineers 19–14. Drive: 1 play, 75 yards, 0:11.
- WYO – Jakorey Hawkins 63-yard blocked field goal return (John Michael Gyllenborg pass from Andrew Peasley), 1:52. Cowboys 22–19.

Top passers

- APP – Joey Aguilar – 22/40, 200 yards, INT
- WYO – Andrew Peasley – 5/15, 31 yards, INT

Top rushers

- APP – Nate Noel – 30 rushes, 107 yards
- WYO – Harrison Waylee – 17 rushes, 156 yards, 1 TD

Top receivers

- APP – Kaedin Robinson – 3 receptions, 51 yards
- WYO – Wyatt Wieland – 2 receptions, 18 yards

=== New Mexico ===
New Mexico Lobos at Wyoming Cowboys – Game summary

Quarter	1	2	3	4	Total
Lobos	6	3	3	14	26
Cowboys	9	3	17	6	35

at War Memorial Stadium, Laramie, Wyoming

- Date: September 30
- Game time: 2:02 p.m. MDT
- Game weather: Sunny, 75 °F (24 °C)
- Game attendance: 25,477
- Referee: Kenneth Ray
- TV announcers (Mountain West Network): Chris Sylvester, Jared Petrino, and Bridget Howard
- Box score, Recap

Game information

First quarter

- UNM – Jeremiah Hixon 17-yard pass from Dylan Hopkins (Luke Drzewiecki kick blocked), 10:50. Lobos 6–0. Drive: 8 plays, 75 yards, 4:10.
- WYO – Jakorey Hawkins 81-yard PAT return, 10:50. Lobos 6–2.
- WYO – Andrew Peasley 2-yard run (John Hoyland kick), 2:58. Cowboys 9–6. Drive: 6 plays, 58 yards, 3:20.

Second quarter

- UNM – Luke Drzewiecki 39-yard field goal, 11:50. Tied 9–9. Drive: 12 plays, 53 yards, 6:08.
- WYO – John Hoyland 38-yard field goal, 6:38. Cowboys 12–9. Drive: 10 plays, 55 yards, 5:12.

Third quarter

- WYO – John Hoyland 34-yard field goal, 10:15. Cowboys 15–9. Drive: 10 plays, 58 yards, 4:45.
- WYO – Harrison Waylee 46-yard run (John Hoyland kick), 7:56. Cowboys 22–9. Drive: 1 play, 46 yards, 0:11.
- UNM – Luke Drzewiecki 26-yard field goal, 5:15. Cowboys 22–12. Drive: 10 plays, 67 yards, 2:41.
- WYO – Ayir Asante 66-yard pass from Andrew Peasley (John Hoyland kick), 0:00. Cowboys 29–12. Drive: 1 play, 66 yards, 0:08.

Fourth quarter

- UNM – Jeremiah Hixon 14-yard pass from Devon Dampier (Luke Drzewiecki kick), 13:06. Cowboys 29–19. Drive: 4 plays, 71 yards, 1:49.
- WYO – John Hoyland 26-yard field goal, 10:57. Cowboys 32–19. Drive: 5 plays, 66 yards, 2:09.
- UNM – DJ Washington 11-yard pass from Devon Dampier (Luke Drzewiecki kick), 1:12. Cowboys 32–26. Drive: 11 plays, 99 yards, 4:42.
- WYO – John Hoyland 38-yard field goal, 0:06. Cowboys 35–26. Drive: 4 plays, 7 yards, 1:06.

Top passers

- UNM – Dylan Hopkins – 15/31, 162 yards, TD, INT
- WYO – Andrew Peasley – 16/25, 194 yards, TD

Top rushers

- UNM – Jacory Croskey-Merritt – 14 rushes, 92 yards
- WYO – Harrison Waylee – 18 rushes, 191 yards, 1 TD

Top receivers

- UNM – Ryan Davis – 4 receptions, 59 yards
- WYO – Ayir Asante – 2 receptions, 72 yards, 1 TD

=== No. 24 Fresno State ===
#24 Fresno State Bulldogs at Wyoming Cowboys – Game summary

Quarter	1	2	3	4	Total
#24 Bulldogs	0	7	3	9	19
Cowboys	3	21	0	0	24

at War Memorial Stadium, Laramie, Wyoming

- Date: October 7
- Game time: 6:05 p.m. MDT
- Game weather: Sunny, 61 °F (16 °C)
- Game attendance: 20,788
- Referee: Nolan Dumas
- TV announcers (FOX): Tim Brando, Spencer Tillman, and Josh Sims
- Box score, Recap

Game information

First quarter

- WYO – John Hoyland 34-yard field goal, 6:59. Cowboys 3–0. Drive: 13 plays, 66 yards, 7:16.

Second quarter

- WYO – Wyatt Wieland 14-yard pass from Andrew Peasley (John Hoyland kick), 14:55. Cowboys 10–0. Drive: 10 plays, 78 yards, 5:38.
- FSU – Jalen Moss 6-yard pass from Mikey Keene (Dylan Lynch kick), 11:17. Cowboys 10–7. Drive: 8 plays, 75 yards, 3:38.
- WYO – Wyatt Wieland 4-yard pass from Andrew Peasley (John Hoyland kick), 6:42. Cowboys 17–7. Drive: 8 plays, 75 yards, 4:35.
- WYO – Treyton Welch 12-yard pass from Andrew Peasley (John Hoyland kick), 0:31. Cowboys 24–7. Drive: 11 plays, 88 yards, 2:23.

Third quarter

- FSU – Dylan Lynch 39-yard field goal, 5:36. Cowboys 24–10. Drive: 15 plays, 63 yards, 6:40.

Fourth quarter

- FSU – Dylan Lynch 38-yard field goal, 8:31. Cowboys 24–13. Drive: 10 plays, 54 yards, 3:51.
- FSU – Mac Dalena 8-yard pass from Logan Fife (Logan Fife pass incomplete), 5:17. Cowboys 24–19. Drive: 7 plays, 48 yards, 3:14.

Top passers

- FSU – Mikey Keene – 23/35, 218 yards, TD
- WYO – Andrew Peasley – 19/27, 183 yards, 3 TD

Top rushers

- FSU – Malik Sherrod – 11 rushes, 48 yards
- WYO – Harrison Waylee – 22 rushes, 83 yards

Top receivers

- FSU – Jalen Moss – 9 receptions, 115 yards, TD
- WYO – Treyton Welch – 6 receptions, 74 yards, TD

=== at Air Force ===
Wyoming Cowboys at Air Force Falcons – Game summary

Quarter	1	2	3	4	Total
Cowboys	14	7	0	6	27
Falcons	7	10	7	10	34

at Falcon Stadium, Colorado Springs, Colorado

- Date: October 14
- Game time: 5:03 p.m. MDT
- Game weather: Sunny
- Game attendance: 28,311
- Referee: Cal McNeill
- TV announcers (CBSSN): Rich Waltz, Aaron Taylor, and Justin Walters
- Box score, Recap

Game information

First quarter

- WYO – Andrew Peasley 1-yard run (John Hoyland kick), 10:23. Cowboys 7–0. Drive: 10 plays, 75 yards, 4:37.
- WYO – Wyatt Wieland 6-yard pass from Andrew Peasley (John Hoyland kick), 3:59. Cowboys 14–0. Drive: 9 plays, 69 yards, 5:23.
- AF – Owen Burk 15-yard run (Matthew Dapore kick), 0:26. Cowboys 14–7. Drive: 7 plays, 75 yards, 3:33.

Second quarter

- AF – John Lee Eldridge III 17-yard pass from Zac Larrier (Matthew Dapore kick), 7:09. Tied 14–14. Drive: 8 plays, 72 yards, 4:13.
- WYO – Ayir Asante 14-yard pass from Andrew Peasley (John Hoyland kick), 1:43. Cowboys 21–14. Drive: 12 plays, 75 yards, 5:26.
- AF – Matthew Dapore 24-yard field goal, 0:00. Cowboys 21–17. Drive: 8 plays, 68 yards, 1:43.

Third quarter

- AF – Zac Larrier 1-yard run (Matthew Dapore kick), 4:47. Falcons 24–21. Drive: 17 plays, 75 yards, 10:13.

Fourth quarter

- AF – Matthew Dapore 43-yard field goal, 11:31. Falcons 27–21. Drive: 11 plays, 45 yards, 5:02.
- WYO – Treyton Welch 7-yard pass from Andrew Peasley (John Hoyland kick blocked), 6:14. Tied 27–27. Drive: 5 plays, 25 yards, 1:45.
- AF – John Lee Eldridge III 58-yard run (Matthew Dapore kick), 2:17. Falcons 34–27. Drive: 3 plays, 65 yards, 1:13.

Top passers

- WYO – Andrew Peasley – 15/25, 212 yards, 3 TD
- AF – Zac Larrier – 6/9, 58 yards, TD

Top rushers

- WYO – Andrew Peasley – 13 rushes, 48 yards
- AF – Zac Larrier – 20 rushes, 111 yards

Top receivers

- WYO – Sam Scott – 3 receptions, 43 yards
- AF – Jared Roznos – 3 receptions, 34 yards

=== at Boise State ===
Wyoming Cowboys at Boise State Broncos – Game summary

Quarter	1	2	3	4	Total
Cowboys	7	0	0	0	7
Broncos	8	7	14	3	32

at Albertsons Stadium, Boise, Idaho

- Date: October 28
- Game time: 3:35 p.m. MDT
- Game weather: Sunny, 44 °F (7 °C)
- Game attendance: 35,189
- Referee: Christian Watson
- TV announcers (FS2): Eric Collins, Devin Gardner
- Box score, Recap

Game information

First quarter

- BSU – Eric McAlister 49-yard pass from Taylen Green (Colt Fulton pass to Matt Lauter), 10:28. Broncos 8–0. Drive: 5 plays, 74 yards, 2:26.
- WYO – John Michael Gyllenborg 19-yard pass from Andrew Peasley (John Hoyland kick), 1:46. Broncos 8–7. Drive: 1 plays, 19 yards, 0:05.

Second quarter

- BSU – Jambres Dubar 2-yard run (Jonah Dalmas kick), 2:04. Broncos 15–7. Drive: 14 plays, 77 yards, 7:35.

Third quarter

- BSU – Taylen Green 9-yard run (Jonah Dalmas kick), 11:00. Broncos 22–7. Drive: 8 plays, 72 yards, 3:55.
- BSU – Prince Strachan 6-yard pass from Maddux Madsen (Jonah Dalmas kick), 1:44. Broncos 29–7. Drive: 11 plays, 69 yards, 6:14.

Fourth quarter

- BSU – Jonah Dalmas 48-yard field goal, 8:25. Broncos 32–7. Drive: 9 plays, 41 yards, 5:02.

Top passers

- WYO – Andrew Peasley – 10/20, 85 yards, TD, INT
- BSU – Maddux Madsen – 12/15, 147 yards, TD

Top rushers

- WYO – Harrison Waylee – 10 rushes, 18 yards
- BSU – George Holani – 20 rushes, 75 yards

Top receivers

- WYO – Treyton Welch – 3 receptions, 28 yards
- BSU – Eric McAlister – 7 receptions, 160 yards, TD

=== Colorado State ===
Colorado State Rams at Wyoming Cowboys – Game summary

Quarter	1	2	3	4	Total
Rams	0	7	0	8	15
Cowboys	3	7	14	0	24

at War Memorial Stadium, Laramie, Wyoming

- Date: November 3
- Game time: 6:03 p.m. MDT
- Game weather: Cloudy, 49 °F (9 °C)
- Game attendance: 27,905
- Referee: Patrick Foy
- TV announcers (CBSSN): Chris Lewis, Robert Turbin, and Emily Proud
- Box score, Recap

Game information

First quarter

- WYO – John Hoyland 30-yard field goal, 6:14. Cowboys 3–0. Drive: 12 plays, 66 yards, 6:21.

Second quarter

- WYO – Gunner Gentry 9-yard pass from Andrew Peasley (John Hoyland kick), 14:34. Cowboys 10–0. Drive: 8 plays, 70 yards, 4:12.
- CSU – Louis Brown IV 18-yard pass from Brayden Fowler-Nicolosi (Jordan Noyes kick), 7:45. Cowboys 10–7. Drive: 7 plays, 62 yards, 2:40.

Third quarter

- WYO – Ayir Asante 11-yard pass from Andrew Peasley (John Hoyland kick), 5:53. Cowboys 17–7. Drive: 6 plays, 38 yards, 2:20.
- WYO – Sam Scott 6-yard run (John Hoyland kick), 1:08. Cowboys 24–7. Drive: 8 plays, 46 yards, 3:41.

Fourth quarter

- CSU – Dylan Goffney 9-yard pass from Brayden Fowler-Nicolosi (Brayden Fowler-Nicolosi pass from Tory Horton), 11:07. Cowboys 24–15. Drive: 3 plays, 38 yards, 1:22.

Top passers

- WYO – Andrew Peasley – 15/22, 140 yards, 2 TD, INT
- CSU – Brayden Fowler-Nicolosi – 24/42, 220 yards, 2 TD, 2 INT

Top rushers

- WYO – Harrison Waylee – 29 rushes, 128 yards
- CSU – Avery Morrow – 11 rushes, 39 yards

Top receivers

- WYO – Alex Brown – 2 receptions, 32 yards
- CSU – Tory Horton – 7 receptions, 58 yards

=== at UNLV ===
Wyoming Cowboys at UNLV Rebels – Game summary

Quarter	1	2	3	4	Total
Cowboys	0	14	0	0	14
Rebels	21	0	7	6	34

at Allegiant Stadium, Paradise, Nevada

- Date: November 10
- Game time: 8:46 p.m. MDT
- Game weather: Indoor, 57 °F (14 °C)
- Game attendance: 25,568
- Referee: Jonathan Noli
- TV announcers (FS1): Alex Faust, Petros Papadakis
- Box score, Recap

Game information

First quarter

- UNLV – Jayden Maiava 10-yard run (Jose Pizano kick), 12:52. Rebels 7–0. Drive: 3 plays, 70 yards, 0:21.
- UNLV – Jayden Maiava 1-yard run (Jose Pizano kick), 8:47. Rebels 14–0. Drive: 7 plays, 29 yards, 2:55.
- UNLV – Jai'Den Thomas 7-yard run (Jose Pizano kick), 4:22. Rebels 21–0. Drive: 7 plays, 67 yards, 3:14.

Second quarter

- WYO – Andrew Peasley 32-yard run (John Hoyland kick), 14:09. Rebels 21–7. Drive: 3 plays, 53 yards, 1:47.
- WYO – Wyatt Wieland 1-yard run (John Hoyland kick), 2:58. Rebels 21–14. Drive: 11 plays, 51 yards, 6:07.

Third quarter

- UNLV – Kaleo Ballungay 5-yard pass from Jayden Maiava (Jose Pizano kick), 2:46. Rebels 28–14. Drive: 13 plays, 70 yards, 6:18.

Fourth quarter

- UNLV – Jose Pizano 39-yard field goal, 7:41. Rebels 31–14. Drive: 12 plays, 45 yards, 6:25.
- UNLV – Jose Pizano 43–yard field goal, 0:47. Rebels 34–14. Drive: 10 plays, 28 yards, 5:50.

Top passers

- WYO – Andrew Peasley – 11/22, 144 yards, INT
- UNLV – Jayden Maiava – 17/24, 232 yards, TD

Top rushers

- WYO – Andrew Peasley – 14 rushes, 69 yards
- UNLV – Jayden Maiava – 11 rushes, 40 yards, 2 TD

Top receivers

- WYO – Wyatt Wieland – 5 receptions, 72 yards
- UNLV – Ricky White – 8 receptions, 144 yards

=== Hawaii ===
Hawaii Rainbow Warriors at Wyoming Cowboys – Game summary

Quarter	1	2	3	4	Total
Rainbow Warriors	0	0	9	0	9
Cowboys	14	21	0	7	42

at War Memorial Stadium, Laramie, Wyoming

- Date: November 18
- Game time: 12:07 p.m. MDT
- Game weather: Sunny, 52 °F (11 °C)
- Game attendance: 18,233
- Referee: Michael Cuttone
- TV announcers (Spectrum Hawaii/Team1Sports): Jordan Helle, Rich Miano
- Box score, Recap

Game information

First quarter

- WYO – Ryan Marquez 44-yard pass from Andrew Peasley (John Hoyland kick), 14:00. Cowboys 7–0. Drive: 3 plays, 75 yards, 1:00.
- WYO – John Michael Gyllenborg 89-yard pass from Andrew Peasley (John Hoyland kick), 10:58. Cowboys 14–0. Drive: 1 play, 89 yards, 0:13.

Second quarter

- WYO – Harrison Waylee 28-yard run (John Hoyland kick), 9:57. Cowboys 21–0. Drive: 6 plays, 69 yards, 2:42.
- WYO – Wyatt Wieland 40-yard pass from Andrew Peasley (John Hoyland kick), 5:56. Cowboys 28–0. Drive: 4 plays, 66 yards, 2:04.
- WYO – Ayir Asante 6-yard run (John Hoyland kick), 2:35. Cowboys 35–0. Drive: 3 plays, 39 yards, 1:10.

Third quarter

- HAW – Matthew Shipley 30-yard field goal, 8:37. Cowboys 35–3. Drive: 7 plays, 12 yards, 4:03.
- HAW – Chuuky Hines 19-yard pass from Brayden Schager (Brayden Schager pass incomplete), 0:59. Cowboys 35–9. Drive: 13 plays, 71 yards, 6:16.

Fourth quarter

- WYO – Evan Svoboda 18-yard run (John Hoyland kick), 4:51. Cowboys 42–9. Drive: 4 plays, 27 yards, 1:58.

Top passers

- WYO – Andrew Peasley – 14/17, 319 yards, 3 TD
- HAW – Brayden Schager – 25/44, 278 yards, TD, 2 INT

Top rushers

- WYO – Harrison Waylee – 11 rushes, 70 yards, TD
- HAW – David Cordero – 13 rushes, 32 yards

Top receivers

- WYO – John Michael Gyllenborg – 3 receptions, 128 yards, TD
- HAW – Steven McBride – 5 receptions, 103 yards

=== at Nevada ===
Wyoming Cowboys at Nevada Wolf Pack – Game summary

Quarter	1	2	3	4	Total
Cowboys	14	7	14	7	42
Wolf Pack	0	6	0	0	6

at Mackay Stadium, Reno, Nevada

- Date: November 25
- Game time: 7:08 p.m. MDT
- Game weather: Clear, 33 °F (1 °C)
- Game attendance: 12,044
- Referee: Patrick Foy
- TV announcers (CBSSN): John Sadak, Randy Cross
- Box score, Recap

Game information

First quarter

- WYO – Andrew Peasley 43-yard run (John Hoyland kick), 6:32. Cowboys 7–0. Drive: 4 plays, 63 yards, 2:05.
- WYO – Will Pelissier 34-yard pass from Andrew Peasley (John Hoyland kick), 3:29. Cowboys 14–0. Drive: 2 plays, 55 yards, 1:27.

Second quarter

- NEV – Brandon Talton 40-yard field goal, 13:28. Cowboys 14–3. Drive: 9 plays, 43 yards, 5:01.
- WYO – Wyatt Ekeler 38-yard interception (John Hoyland kick), 9:54. Cowboys 21–3.
- NEV – Brandon Talton 47-yard field goal, 2:23. Cowboys 21–6. Drive: 10 plays, 51 yards, 4:46.

Third quarter

- WYO – Ayir Asante 9-yard pass from Andrew Peasley (John Hoyland kick), 11:43. Cowboys 28–6. Drive: 5 plays, 25 yards, 3:05.
- WYO – Harrison Waylee 2-yard run (John Hoyland kick), 7:09. Cowboys 35–6. Drive: 5 plays, 44 yards, 2:54.

Fourth quarter

- WYO – Andrew Peasley 3-yard run (John Hoyland kick), 12:56. Cowboys 42–6. Drive: 12 plays, 82 yards, 6:19.

Top passers

- WYO – Andrew Peasley – 12/18, 165 yards, 2 TD
- NEV – Shane Illingworth – 15/27, 175 yards, INT

Top rushers

- WYO – Andrew Peasley – 9 rushes, 96 yards, 2 TD
- NEV – Sean Dollars – 8 rushes, 31 yards

Top receivers

- WYO – Wyatt Wieland – 4 receptions, 43 yards
- NEV – Spencer Curtis – 5 receptions, 70 yards

=== vs Toledo—Arizona Bowl ===
2023 Barstool Sports Arizona Bowl
Toledo Rockets (11-2, 8-0) vs Wyoming Cowboys (8-4, 5-3) – Game summary

Quarter	1	2	3	4	Total
Rockets	0	10	5	0	15
Cowboys	3	3	0	10	16

at Arizona Stadium • Tucson, Arizona

- Date: Saturday, December 30th, 2023
- Game time: 3:30 pm EST/2:30 pm MST/11:30 am PST
- Game weather: Sunny • Temperature: 70 °F (21 °C) • Wind: 7 mph (11 km/h) S
- Game attendance: 30,428
- TV announcers (Barstool Sports/The CW): Jake Marsh (Play-by-Play), Dave Portnoy, Dan Katz (Color Commentator), Caleb Pressley and Adam Ferrone (Sideline Reporter)
- Box score

Game information

First quarter

- (6:31) WYO – John Hoyland 34-yard field goal (Drive: 13 plays, 77 yards, 7:26; Wyoming 3–0)

Second quarter

- (11:20) WYO – John Hoyland 52-yard field goal (Drive: 10 plays, 63 yards, 5:54; Wyoming 6–0)
- (8:36) TOL – Luke Pawlak 33-yard field goal (Drive: 10 plays, 60 yards, 2:44; Wyoming 6–3)
- (5:19) TOL – Jacquez Stuart 80-yard run, Luke Pawlak kick (Drive: 1 plays, 80 yards, 0:12; Toledo 10–6)

Third quarter

- (6:31) TOL – Team Safety (Drive: 3 plays, -6 yards, 1:26; Toledo 12–6)
- (2:04) TOL – Luke Pawlak 33-yard field goal (Drive: 11 plays, 35 yards, 4:27; Toledo 15–6)

Fourth quarter

- (8:37) WYO – Evan Svoboda 1-yard run, John Hoyland kick (Drive: 8 plays, 73 yards, 4:03; Toledo 15–13)
- (0:01) WYO – John Hoyland 24-yard field goal (Drive: 12 plays, 87 yards, 4:11; Wyoming 16–15)

Top passers

- TOL - Tucker Gleason – 14/34, 184 yards, INT
- WYO - Andrew Peasley – 20/25, 168 yards

Top rushers

- TOL - Jacquez Stuart – 9 carries, 99 yards, TD
- WYO - Harrison Waylee – 18 carries, 91 yards

Top receivers

- TOL - Jerjuan Newton – 5 receptions, 74 yards
- WYO - Wyatt Wieland – 5 receptions, 55 yards

== Personnel ==
=== Coaching staff ===
Name	Position	Consecutive Years
Craig Bohl	Head coach	10th
Mike Grant	Associate Head Coach/Offensive Pass Coordinator/Wide Receivers	8th
Oscar Giles	Associate Head Coach/Freshman/Defensive Run Coordinate/Defensive Tackles	2nd
Tim Polasek	Offensive Coordinator/Quarterbacks	3rd
Jay Sawvel	Defensive Coordinator/Safeties	4th
Aaron Bohl	Linebackers	7th
Benny Boyd	Co-Special Teams Coordinator/Cornerbacks	4th
Gordie Haug	Recruiting Director/Running Backs	10th
Brian Hendricks	Defensive Ends	1st
Shannon Moore	Co-Special Teams Coordinator/Tight Ends and Fullbacks	5th
Joe Tripodi	Offensive Line	2nd
Eric Donoval	Director of Sports Performance	6th

=== Roster ===
2023 Wyoming Cowboys Football
Quarterback: 6 Andrew Peasley – graduate (6'2", 213); 12 Jayden Clemons – (redshirt) junior (6'1", 210); 13 Gage Brook – freshman (6'4", 185); 15 Carson May – (redshirt) freshman (6'4", 221); 17 Evan Svoboda – (redshirt) sophomore (6'5", 245); 18 Kaden Anderson – freshman (6'4", 221); Running Back: 3 Dawaiian McNeely – (redshirt) junior (6'2", 208); 4 Harrison Waylee – (redshirt) junior (5'10", 198); 7 D.Q. James – (redshirt) sophomore (5'7", 170); 21 Jeremy Hollingsworth – (redshirt) junior (5'9", 210); 22 Sam Scott – (redshirt) sophomore (6'2", 230); 25 Mitchell Anderson – (redshirt) sophomore (5'8", 183); 26 L.J. Richardson – (redshirt) freshman (6'1", 215); 30 Tyler Jacklich – freshman (6'3", 205); 32 Jamari Ferrell – junior (5'8", 190); 35 Kimball Madsen – (redshirt) sophomore (6'1", 235); 36 Caleb Driskill – (redshirt) junior (6'2", 244); 40 Cooper Mailand – freshman (6'2", 220); Wide Receiver: 2 Devin Boddie Jr. – junior (5'11", 175); 5 Ayir Asante – junior (6'0", 174); 8 Jaylen Sargent – (redshirt) sophomore (6'2", 183); 9 Alex Brown – (redshirt) junior (6'4", 198); 11 Wyatt Wieland – graduate (6'1", 207); 14 Justin Stevenson – freshman (6'1", 184); 16 Gunner Gentry – graduate (6'3", 208); 19 Caleb Cooley – junior (5'7", 168); 20 Ryan Marquez – graduate (6'1", 204); 23 Caleb Merritt – (redshirt) freshman (5'11", 187); 24 Charlie Coenen – (redshirt) freshman (6'0", 194); 41 Kayden LaFramboise – (redshirt) freshman (6'4", 195); 82 Bricen Brantley – freshman (6'3", 175); 83 Will Pelissier – (redshirt) junior (6'3", 205); 85 Chase Locke – junior (6'3", 204); Tight End: 80 Justin Erb – sophomore (6'2", 230); 81 Treyton Welch – graduate (6'3", 241); 84 John Michael Gyllenborg – (redshirt) sophomore (6'5", 243); 86 Nick Miles – (redshirt) junior (6'5", 259); 87 Isaac Schoenfeld – (redshirt) freshman (6'5", 256); 88 Colin O'Brien – senior (6'6", 245); Long Snapper: 52 Carson York – sophomore (6'1", 201)	Offensive Line: 53 Dante Gavito – sophomore (6'3", 291); 55 Ethan Drewes – junior (6'3", 278); 57 Luke Sandy – (redshirt) freshman (6'2", 289); 60 Wyatt Walters – freshman (6'4", 290); 61 JJ Uphold – (redshirt) sophomore (6'5", 285); 63 Kuba Tyszka – freshman (6'6", 275); 64 Brandt Rice – freshman (6'5", 290); 65 Nathan Geiger – freshman (6'5", 265); 66 Ethan Shipp – sophomore (6'4", 308); 69 Abraham Bangoura – freshman (6'5", 250); 70 Rex Johnsen – (redshirt) freshman (6'5", 294); 71 Jake Davies – freshman (6'7", 250); 72 Caden Barnett – (redshirt) sophomore (6'5", 305); 74 Forrest Scheel – (redshirt) freshman (6'7", 295); 75 Frank Crum – graduate (6'7", 315); 76 Quinn Grovesteen-Matchey – freshman (6'6", 240); 77 Nofoafia Tulafono – (redshirt) junior (6'2", 323); 78 Wes King – (redshirt) freshman (6'5", 292); 79 Jack Walsh – (redshirt) sophomore (6'3", 309); Defensive Line: 34 Braden Siders – (redshirt) sophomore (6'3", 235); 40 Tyce Westland – (redshirt) sophomore (6'5", 240); 50 Jaxon Galica – freshman (6'5", 230); 54 Sabastian Harsh – (redshirt) sophomore (6'3", 242); 55 Kevin Sjogren – (redshirt) freshman (6'5", 240); 58 Jordan Turnbull – freshman (6'5", 215); 59 Ethan Day – sophomore (6'4", 244); 63 Ben Florentine – (redshirt) sophomore (6'1", 268); 68 Cody Crawford – freshman (6'1", 280); 75 Lucas Samsula – freshman (6'4", 255); 88 Tell Wade – freshman (6'3", 250); 90 Gavin Meyer – (redshirt) junior (6'4", 280); 91 Jaden Williams – (redshirt) freshman (6'4", 278); 92 Dante Drake – freshman (6'3", 267); 93 DeVonne Harris – (redshirt) junior (6'4", 230); 94 Cole Godbout – graduate (6'4", 290); 95 Caleb Robinson – (redshirt) junior (6'2", 296); 96 Jordan Bertagnole – (redshirt) junior (6'4", 287); 98 Jayden Williams – freshman (6'3", 270); 99 Keelan Cox – (redshirt) sophomore (6'5", 243)	Linebacker: 25 Cole DeMarzo – (redshirt) sophomore (6'4", 228); 28 Easton Gibbs – (redshirt) junior (6'2", 235); 33 Connor Shay – (redshirt) junior (6'2", 230); 41 Cayden Hawkins – freshman (6'3", 210); 43 Shae Suiaunoa – (redshirt) junior (6'3", 231); 44 Micah Young – (redshirt) sophomore (6'2", 210); 45 Read Sunn – (redshirt) sophomore (6'2", 232); 49 Nic Talich – (redshirt) sophomore (6'0", 221); 51 Brady Hultman – freshman (6'1", 215); Defensive Back: 2 Wrook Brown – (redshirt) sophomore (5'11", 185); 3 Andrew Johnson – (redshirt) sophomore (6'1", 192); 5 Deron Harrell – graduate (6'2", 182); 6 Kolbey Taylor – (redshirt) sophomore (6'4", 186); 7 Jakorey Hawkins – (redshirt) senior (5'11", 187); 8 Buck Coors – (redshirt) sophomore (5'11", 190); 9 Tyrecus Davis – (redshirt) junior (5'10", 181); 11 Josh Dixon – (redshirt) freshman (5'11", 178); 12 Chauncey Carter – freshman (6'0", 175); 13 Ian Bell – freshman (6'1", 180); 14 Naz Hill – freshman (6'3", 180); 15 TJ Urban – (redshirt) freshman (6'1", 203); 18 Keany Parks – freshman (6'1", 180); 20 Lafai Purcell – freshman (5'11", 155); 21 Koa McIntyre – (redshirt) freshman (6'0", 206); 22 Jovan Marsh – (redshirt) sophomore (5'11", 195); 23 Jones Thomas – freshman (6'2", 180); 24 Malique Singleton – (redshirt) freshman (6'0", 190); 26 Daylen Wilson – (redshirt) junior (5'11", 181); 29 Isaac Sell – (redshirt) sophomore (5'10", 194); 30 Miles Tucker – freshman (6'0", 190); 31 Wyett Ekeler – (redshirt) junior (5'11", 197); 32 Jevon Davis – (redshirt) sophomore (6'0", 203); 35 Nikos Varelas – freshman (5'10", 185); 37 Brenndan Warady – (redshirt) sophomore (5'11", 192); 42 Isaac White – (redshirt) junior (6'1", 205); Placekicker: 46 John Hoyland – junior (5'10", 194); 47 Erik Sandvik – freshman (6'1", 155); Punter: 27 Ralph Fawaz – (redshirt) junior (6'1", 200); 39 Clayton Stewart – graduate (6'1", 215)

=== Departures ===
==== Entered NFL ====
Player	Position	Team
Eric Abojei	OL	Miami Dolphins
Titus Swen	RB	Indianapolis Colts

==== Outgoing transfers ====
Player	Position	Height	Weight	Year	New team
Caden Becker	DE	6'4"	235	RS Freshman	Nebraska
Gavin Beerup	WR	6'5"	210	RS Sophomore	Nebraska–Kearney
Akili Bonner	DE	6'4"	250	RS Junior	Davenport
Joey Braasch	RB	6'1"	210	RS Freshman	TBD
Joshua Cobbs	WR	6'4"	204	RS Junior	Houston
Jagger Filippone	OL	6'6"	265	Freshman	San Diego
Hank Gibbs	QB	6'6"	240	RS Freshman	Northern Colorado
Keonte Glinton	DB	5'11"	190	RS Junior	New Mexico State
Tyrese Grant	WR	6'0"	185	RS Freshman	TBD
Zaire Jackson	DB	5'11"	170	Freshman	TBD
Mykel Janise	OL	6'4"	280	RS Freshman	Louisiana Tech
Oluwaseyi Omatosho	DE	6'2"	246	RS Sophomore	Oregon State
Emmanuel Pregnon	RG	6'6"	318	RS Sophomore	USC
Cam Stone	DB	5'10"	181	Senior	Hawaii
Jordan Vaughn	RB	6'3"	240	RS Sophomore	Abilene Christian
Deshawn Woods	OL	6'5"	285	Freshman	TBD

=== Additions ===
==== Incoming transfers ====
Player	Position	Height	Weight	Year	Previous team
Ayir Asante	WR	6'0"	174	Senior	Holy Cross
Devin Boddie Jr.	WR	5'11"	175	Junior	Vanderbilt
Tyrecus Davis	DB	5'10"	181	Junior	Navarro Community College
Carson May	QB	6'5"	208	RFreshman	Iowa
Harrison Waylee	RB	5'10"	192	Junior	Northern Illinois

==== Recruiting ====
College recruiting
Name	Hometown	School	Height	Weight	Commit date
Kaden Anderson; QB	Southlake, TX	Carroll HS	6 ft 4 in (1.93 m)	205 lb (93 kg)	Aug 1, 2022
Kaden Anderson; QB	Recruit ratings: Rivals: 247Sports:				
Ian Bell; CB	La Verne, CA	Damien HS	6 ft 1 in (1.85 m)	180 lb (82 kg)	Dec 21, 2022
Ian Bell; CB	Recruit ratings: Rivals: 247Sports:				
Bricen Brantley; WR	Houston, TX	Alief Taylor HS	6 ft 3 in (1.91 m)	175 lb (79 kg)	Dec 8, 2022
Bricen Brantley; WR	Recruit ratings: Rivals: 247Sports:				
Chauncey Carter; CB	Garland, TX	Garland HS	6 ft 0 in (1.83 m)	175 lb (79 kg)	Dec 21, 2022
Chauncey Carter; CB	Recruit ratings: Rivals: 247Sports:				
Jake Davies; OT	Yorkville, IL	Yorkville HS	6 ft 7 in (2.01 m)	250 lb (110 kg)	Dec 21, 2022
Jake Davies; OT	Recruit ratings: Rivals: 247Sports:				
Dante Drake; DT	Robinson, TX	Robinson HS	6 ft 3 in (1.91 m)	267 lb (121 kg)	Aug 1, 2022
Dante Drake; DT	Recruit ratings: Rivals: 247Sports:				
Nathan Geiger; OL	Highlands Ranch, CO	ThunderRidge HS	6 ft 5 in (1.96 m)	265 lb (120 kg)	Feb 1, 2023
Nathan Geiger; OL	Recruit ratings: Rivals: 247Sports:				
Quinn Grovesteen-Matchey; OT	Evansville, WI	Evansville HS	6 ft 6 in (1.98 m)	240 lb (110 kg)	Jul 7, 2022
Quinn Grovesteen-Matchey; OT	Recruit ratings: Rivals: 247Sports:				
Naz Hill; CB	Kankakee, IL	Kankakee HS	6 ft 3 in (1.91 m)	180 lb (82 kg)	Dec 21, 2022
Naz Hill; CB	Recruit ratings: Rivals: 247Sports:				
Tyler Jacklich; RB	Modesto, CA	Central Catholic HS	6 ft 3 in (1.91 m)	205 lb (93 kg)	Feb 1, 2023
Tyler Jacklich; RB	Recruit ratings: Rivals: 247Sports:				
Keany Parks; RB	Kenosha, WI	Bradford HS	6 ft 3 in (1.91 m)	180 lb (82 kg)	Dec 21, 2022
Keany Parks; RB	Recruit ratings: Rivals: 247Sports:				
Brandt Rice; OL	Wausau, WI	Wausau West HS	6 ft 5 in (1.96 m)	290 lb (130 kg)	Jan 30, 2023
Brandt Rice; OL	Recruit ratings: Rivals: 247Sports:				
Lucas Samsula; DT	Plano, TX	Plano West HS	6 ft 4 in (1.93 m)	255 lb (116 kg)	Dec 21, 2022
Lucas Samsula; DT	Recruit ratings: Rivals: 247Sports:				
Justin Stevenson; WR	Katy, TX	Paetow HS	6 ft 1 in (1.85 m)	175 lb (79 kg)	Dec 21, 2022
Justin Stevenson; WR	Recruit ratings: Rivals: 247Sports:				
Jones Thomas; S	Fort Collins, CO	Poudre HS	6 ft 2 in (1.88 m)	180 lb (82 kg)	Feb 3, 2023
Jones Thomas; S	Recruit ratings: Rivals: 247Sports:				
Kuba Tyszka; OL	Norridge, IL	Ridgewood HS	6 ft 6 in (1.98 m)	275 lb (125 kg)	Feb 1, 2023
Kuba Tyszka; OL	Recruit ratings: Rivals: 247Sports:				
Tell Wade; DE	Wray, CO	Wray HS	6 ft 3 in (1.91 m)	250 lb (110 kg)	May 3, 2022
Tell Wade; DE	Recruit ratings: Rivals: 247Sports:				
Jayden Williams; DT	Bryan, TX	Rudder HS	6 ft 3 in (1.91 m)	270 lb (120 kg)	Dec 21, 2022
Jayden Williams; DT	Recruit ratings: Rivals: 247Sports:				
Overall recruit ranking: Rivals: #110 247Sports: #110
Note: In many cases, Scout, Rivals, 247Sports, On3, and ESPN may conflict in their listings of height and weight.; In these cases, the average was taken. ESPN grades are on a 100-point scale.; Sources: "Rivals commits". Rivals.; "ESPN commits". ESPN.; "2023 Team Ranking". Rivals.com.; "247Sports commits". 247Sports.

== Statistics ==
=== Team ===
	Wyoming	Opp
Scoring	329	290
Points per game	25.3	22.3
First downs	242	258
Rushing	115	102
Passing	103	143
Penalty	24	13
Rushing yards	2060	1879
Avg per play	4.4	4.1
Avg per game	158.5	144.5
Rushing touchdowns	19	12
Passing yards	2191	2772
Att-Comp-Int	304-189-6	433-253-11
Avg per pass	7.2	6.4
Avg per catch	11.6	11.0
Avg per game	168.5	213.2
Passing touchdowns	20	18
Total offense	4251	4651
Avg per play	5.5	5.2
Avg per game	327.0	357.8
Fumbles-Lost	11-5	16-11
Penalties-Yards	51-434	60-531
Avg per game	33.4	40.8

	Wyoming	Opp
Punts-Yards	61-2567	50-2228
Avg per punt	42.1	44.6
Time of possession/Game	30:14	29:46
3rd down conversions	56-152	85-191
4th down conversions	6-9	13-23
Touchdowns scored	41	32
Field goals-Attempts	13-20	22-28
PAT-Attempts	38-39	26-27

=== Individual leaders ===
==== Passing ====
Passing statistics
#	NAME	GP	RAT	CMP	ATT	YDS	AVG/G	CMP%	TD	INT	LONG
6	Andrew Peasley	12	146.3	166	266	1991	165.9	62.4%	20	5	89
17	Evan Svoboda	10	99.5	23	38	200	20.0	60.5%	0	1	20
	TOTALS	13	140.5	189	304	2191	168.5	62.2%	20	6	89

==== Rushing ====
Rushing statistics
#	NAME	GP	ATT	GAIN	AVG	TD	LONG	AVG/G
4	Harrison Waylee	10	164	947	5.8	5	75	94.7
6	Andrew Peasley	12	110	419	3.8	7	43	34.9
22	Sam Scott	13	49	237	4.8	2	19	18.2
32	Jamari Ferrell	11	52	188	3.6	1	17	17.1
7	D.Q. James	4	35	106	3.0	0	15	26.5
17	Evan Svoboda	10	25	80	3.2	2	18	8.0
21	Jeremy Hollingsworth	4	6	31	5.2	0	10	7.8
2	Devin Boddie	13	4	30	6.5	0	26	2.0
11	Wyatt Wieland	13	7	22	3.1	1	11	1.7
5	Ayir Asante	13	4	11	2.8	1	10	0.8
83	Will Pelissier	9	3	6	2.0	0	4	0.7
23	Caleb Merritt	6	1	-1	-1.0	0	0	-0.2
12	Jayden Clemons	2	1	-2	-2.0	0	0	-1.0
	Team	13	7	-10	-1.4	0	0	-0.8
	TOTALS	13	468	2060	4.4	19	75	158.5

==== Receiving ====
Receiving statistics
#	NAME	GP	CTH	YDS	AVG	TD	LONG	AVG/G
11	Wyatt Wieland	13	44	480	10.9	5	40	36.9
81	Treyton Welch	13	31	308	9.9	2	32	23.7
84	John Michael Gyllenborg	13	23	360	15.7	3	89	27.7
5	Ayir Asante	13	21	372	17.7	6	66	28.6
20	Ryan Marquez	13	12	164	13.7	1	44	12.6
4	Harrison Waylee	10	12	66	5.5	0	12	6.6
22	Sam Scott	13	11	77	7.0	0	18	5.9
9	Alex Brown	12	8	106	13.3	0	28	8.8
83	Will Pelissier	9	7	79	11.3	1	34	8.8
2	Devin Boddie	13	6	48	8.0	0	19	3.7
16	Gunner Gentry	12	3	31	10.3	1	17	2.6
36	Caleb Driskill	13	2	15	7.5	1	11	1.2
88	Colin O'Brien	13	2	20	10.0	0	14	1.7
7	D.Q. James	4	2	14	7.0	0	9	3.5
32	Jamari Ferrell	11	2	7	3.5	0	6	0.6
8	Jalen Sargent	7	1	15	15.0	0	15	2.1
23	Caleb Merritt	6	1	7	7.0	0	7	1.2
	TOTALS	13	189	2191	11.6	20	89	168.5

==== Defense ====
Defense statistics
#	NAME	GP	SOLO	AST	TOT	TFL-YDS	SACK-YDS	INT	BU	QBH	FR	FF	BLK	SAF	TD
28	Easton Gibbs	13	47	62	109	4.0-20	2.0-17	1	6	3	1	2	0	0	0
43	Shae Suiaunoa	13	60	33	93	5.5-31	2.5-24	1	2	2	0	0	0	0	0
31	Wyett Ekeler	13	49	28	77	5.5-27	2.0-20	2	7	0	1	2	0	0	0
42	Isaac White	13	33	28	61	2.0-15	1.0-8	1	7	0	0	0	0	0	0
96	Jordan Bertagnole	13	27	33	60	5.5-19	2.0-4	0	2	6	0	1	0	0	0
54	Sabastian Harsh	12	30	20	50	9.0-33	3.0-20	0	1	1	1	0	0	0	0
2	Wrook Brown	12	34	13	47	1.0-1	0-0	3	4	0	1	0	0	0	0
94	Cole Godbout	13	12	31	43	4.0-13	2.0-10	1	0	2	0	0	0	0	0
7	Jakorey Hawkins	13	31	10	41	0.5-1	0-0	1	8	0	0	0	0	0	1
93	DeVonne Harris	13	20	15	35	4.0-29	4.0-29	0	4	8	1	0	2	0	0
6	Kolbey Taylor	9	22	7	29	0-0	0-0	0	7	0	1	0	0	0	0
12	Tyrecus Davis	9	24	3	27	0-0	0-0	1	7	0	2	1	0	0	0
90	Gavin Meyer	13	13	13	26	3.5-8	0-0	0	0	5	0	0	0	1	0
34	Braden Siders	12	15	11	26	5.0-20	4.0-19	0	2	4	0	0	0	0	0
40	Tyce Westland	13	8	10	18	4.5-15	0.5-3	0	1	1	1	1	0	0	0
33	Connor Shay	13	8	7	15	0-0	0-0	0	0	0	0	0	0	0	0
25	Cole DeMarzo	13	8	6	14	1.0-3	0-0	0	0	0	0	0	0	0	0
63	Ben Florentine	12	7	4	11	0-0	0-0	0	0	0	0	0	0	0	0
8	Buck Coors	9	10	0	10	2.0-5	0-0	0	0	1	0	0	0	0	0
95	Caleb Robinson	11	5	4	9	1.0-3	0-0	0	1	0	0	0	0	0	0
3	Andrew Johnson	13	4	3	7	1.0-6	0-0	0	1	0	1	0	0	0	0
44	Micah Young	13	1	6	7	0-0	0-0	0	0	0	0	0	0	0	0
13	Ian Bell	12	2	4	6	0-0	0-0	0	0	0	0	0	0	0	0
22	Sam Scott	13	2	1	3	0-0	0-0	0	0	0	0	0	0	0	0
55	Kevin Sjogren	2	1	2	3	0-0	0-0	0	0	1	0	0	0	0	0
52	Carson York	13	2	1	3	0-0	0-0	0	0	0	0	0	0	0	0
11	Wyatt Wieland	13	2	0	2	0-0	0-0	0	0	0	0	0	0	0	0
20	Ryan Marquez	13	2	0	2	0-0	0-0	0	0	0	0	1	0	0	0
36	Caleb Driskill	13	1	1	2	0-0	0-0	0	0	0	1	0	0	0	0
19	Caleb Cooley	13	1	1	2	0-0	0-0	0	0	0	0	0	0	0	0
49	Nic Talich	13	1	1	2	0-0	0-0	0	0	0	0	0	0	0	0
91	Jaden Williams	5	1	1	2	1.0-6	1.0-6	0	0	1	0	0	0	0	0
16	Gunner Gentry	12	1	0	1	0-0	0-0	0	0	0	0	0	0	0	0
21	Jeremy Hollingsworth	4	1	0	1	0-0	0-0	0	0	0	0	0	0	0	0
46	John Hoyland	13	0	1	1	0-0	0-0	0	0	0	0	0	0	0	0
45	Read Sunn	13	0	1	1	0-0	0-0	0	0	0	0	0	0	0	0
8	Jalen Sargent	7	1	0	1	0-0	0-0	0	0	0	0	0	0	0	0
11	Josh Dixon	4	1	0	1	0-0	0-0	0	0	0	0	0	0	0	0
24	Malique Singleton	3	1	0	1	0-0	0-0	0	0	0	0	0	0	0	0
25	Mitchell Anderson	1	0	1	1	0-0	0-0	0	0	0	0	0	0	0	0
41	Cayden Hawkins	2	1	0	1	0-0	0-0	0	0	0	0	0	0	0	0
	TOTALS	13	489	362	851	60-255	24-160	11	60	34	11	8	3	0	1

Key: POS: Position, SOLO: Solo Tackles, AST: Assisted Tackles, TOT: Total Tackles, TFL: Tackles-for-loss, SACK: Quarterback Sacks, INT: Interceptions, BU: Passes Broken Up, PD: Passes Defended, QBH: Quarterback Hits, FR: Fumbles Recovered, FF: Forced Fumbles, BLK: Kicks or Punts Blocked, SAF: Safeties, TD : Touchdown

==== Special teams ====
Kicking statistics
#	NAME	GP	XPM	XPA	XP%	FGM	FGA	FG%	1–19	20–29	30–39	40–49	50+	LNG
46	John Hoyland	13	38	39	97.4%	13	20	65.0%	0-0	2-2	8-8	0-3	3-7	56

Kickoff statistics
#	NAME	GP	KICKS	YDS	AVG	TB	OB
46	John Hoyland	13	65	4025	61.9	30	4

Punting statistics
#	NAME	GP	PUNTS	YDS	AVG	LONG	TB	I–20	50+	BLK
39	Clayton Stewart	13	61	2567	42.1	72	6	17	14	0

Kick return statistics
#	NAME	GP	RTNS	YDS	AVG	TD	LNG
5	Ayir Asante	13	8	166	20.8	0	31
11	Wyatt Wieland	13	6	92	15.3	0	27
	TOTALS	13	16	258	18.4	0	31

Punt return statistics
#	NAME	GP	RTNS	YDS	AVG	TD	LONG
19	Caleb Cooley	13	8	34	4.3	0	14
2	Devin Boddie	13	1	-1	-1.0	0	0
	TOTALS	13	9	33	3.7	0	14
