= Henry Priestley =

Henry Priestley may refer to:

- Henry Priestley (biochemist)
- Henry Priestley (mathematician)
