= 2023 Arizona Bowl =

Postseason college football bowl game

2023 Barstool Sports Arizona Bowl
- 8th Arizona Bowl
Toledo Rockets	Wyoming Cowboys
(11–2)	(8–4)
MAC	Mountain West
15	16
Head coach: Jason Candle	Head coach: Craig Bohl
	1	2	3	4	Total
Toledo	0	10	5	0	15
Wyoming	3	3	0	10	16
- Date: December 30, 2023
- Season: 2023
- Stadium: Arizona Stadium
- Location: Tucson, Arizona
- MVP: John Hoyland (K, Wyoming)
- Favorite: Wyoming by 2.5
- Referee: Ted Pitts (Sun Belt)
- Attendance: 30,428

United States TV coverage
- Network: The CW (also streaming online on Barstool Sports)
- Announcers: Jake Marsh (play-by-play), Dave Portnoy and Dan "Big Cat" Katz (analysts), Caleb Pressley and Adam Ferrone (sideline)

The 2023 Arizona Bowl was a college football bowl game played on December 30, 2023, at Arizona Stadium in Tucson, Arizona. The eighth annual Arizona Bowl game featured Toledo from the Mid-American Conference (MAC) and Wyoming from the Mountain West Conference. The game began at approximately 2:30 p.m. MST and was aired on Barstool Sports's website and social media. The Arizona Bowl was one of the 2023–24 bowl games concluding the 2023 FBS football season. Barstool Sports was also the game's title sponsor, and the game was officially known as the Barstool Sports Arizona Bowl.

== Teams ==
Consistent with conference tie-ins, the bowl featured the Toledo Rockets of the Mid-American Conference (MAC) against the Wyoming Cowboys of the Mountain West Conference.

This was the third meeting between Toledo and Wyoming; each team had one win in their prior two meetings.

=== Toledo Rockets ===
The Rockets entered the game with an 11–2 record (8–0 in the MAC), having won their conference's West Division title. However, they lost the 2023 MAC Championship Game to Miami (OH), 23–14.

This was Toledo's first Arizona Bowl.

=== Wyoming Cowboys ===
The Cowboys entered the game with an 8–4 record (5–3 in the Mountain West), having tied for fourth place in their conference.

This was Wyoming's third Arizona Bowl, setting a new mark for most appearances in the game. The Cowboys previously won the 2019 edition and lost the 2022 edition.

== Game summary ==
2023 Barstool Sports Arizona Bowl

Quarter	1	2	3	4	Total
Toledo	0	10	5	0	15
Wyoming	3	3	0	10	16

at Arizona Stadium • Tucson, Arizona

- Date: Saturday, December 30, 2023
- Game time: 2:30 p.m. MST
- Game weather: Sunny • Temperature: 70 °F (21 °C) • Wind: 7 mph (11 km/h) S
- Game attendance: 30,428
- TV announcers (Barstool.TV / The CW): Jake Marsh (play-by-play), Dave Portnoy and Dan "Big Cat" Katz (analysts), Caleb Pressley and Adam Ferrone (sideline)
- Box score

Game information

First quarter

- (6:31) WYO – John Hoyland 34-yard field goal (Drive: 13 plays, 77 yards, 7:26; Wyoming 3–0)

Second quarter

- (11:20) WYO – John Hoyland 52-yard field goal (Drive: 10 plays, 63 yards, 5:54; Wyoming 6–0)
- (8:36) TOL – Luke Pawlak 33-yard field goal (Drive: 10 plays, 60 yards, 2:44; Wyoming 6–3)
- (5:19) TOL – Jacquez Stuart 80-yard run, Luke Pawlak kick (Drive: 1 plays, 80 yards, 0:12; Toledo 10–6)

Third quarter

- (6:31) TOL – Team Safety (Drive: 3 plays, -6 yards, 1:26; Toledo 12–6)
- (2:04) TOL – Luke Pawlak 33-yard field goal (Drive: 11 plays, 35 yards, 4:27; Toledo 15–6)

Fourth quarter

- (8:37) WYO – Evan Svoboda 1-yard run, John Hoyland kick (Drive: 8 plays, 73 yards, 4:03; Toledo 15–13)
- (0:01) WYO – John Hoyland 24-yard field goal (Drive: 12 plays, 87 yards, 4:11; Wyoming 16–15)

=== Statistics ===
Statistics	TOL	WYO
First downs	14	23
Plays–yards	328	354
Rushes–yards	144	170
Passing yards	184	184
Passing: comp–att–int	14–34	21–27
Time of possession	21:01	38:59

Team	Category	Player	Statistics
Toledo	Passing	Tucker Gleason	14/34, 184 yards, INT
Toledo	Rushing	Jacquez Stuart	9 carries, 99 yards, TD
Toledo	Receiving	Jerjuan Newton	5 catches, 74 yards
Wyoming	Passing	Andrew Peasley	20/25, 168 yards
Wyoming	Rushing	Harrison Waylee	18 carries, 91 yards
Wyoming	Receiving	Wyatt Wieland	5 catches, 55 yards
