= 2017 Dollar General Bowl =

- 19th Dollar General Bowl
Appalachian State Mountaineers	Toledo Rockets
(8–4)	(11–2)
Sun Belt	MAC
34	0
Head coach: Scott Satterfield	Head coach: Jason Candle
	1	2	3	4	Total
Appalachian State	7	13	7	7	34
Toledo	0	0	0	0	0
- Date: December 23, 2017
- Season: 2017
- Stadium: Ladd–Peebles Stadium
- Location: Mobile, Alabama
- MVP: Jalin Moore (RB, Appalachian State)
- Referee: Kevin Hassell (Mtn. West)
- Attendance: 28,706
- Payout: US$1,500,000

United States TV coverage
- Network: ESPN
- Announcers: Dave Neal, Matt Stinchcomb, Dawn Davenport

The 2017 Dollar General Bowl was a college football bowl game played on December 23, 2017, at Ladd–Peebles Stadium in Mobile, Alabama, United States. The 19th edition of the Dollar General Bowl featured the Sun Belt Conference co-champion Appalachian State Mountaineers against the Mid-American Conference champion Toledo Rockets. Kickoff was scheduled for 6:00 p.m. CST and the game aired on ESPN. It was one of the 2017–18 bowl games concluding the 2017 FBS football season. The game was sponsored by the Dollar General chain of variety stores.

== Teams ==
The game featured the Appalachian State Mountaineers against the Toledo Rockets. It was the second all-time meeting between the schools; the first was the 2016 Camellia Bowl which saw the Mountaineers defeat the Rockets by a score of 31–28.

=== Appalachian State Mountaineers ===
This was the Mountaineers' first Dollar General Bowl.

=== Toledo Rockets ===
This was the Rockets' third Dollar General Bowl; their record in prior games was 2–0, having previously defeated the UTEP Miners 45–13 in the 2005 game (when it was known as the GMAC Bowl) and having subsequently defeated the Arkansas State Red Wolves 63–44 in the January 2015 game (when it was known as the GoDaddy Bowl).

== Game summary ==
=== Scoring summary ===
Scoring summary

Quarter	Time	Drive			Team	Scoring information	Score	
Quarter	Time	Plays	Yards	TOP	Team	Scoring information	APP	TOL
1	4:06	5	36	1:13	APP	Jalin Moore 7-yard touchdown run, Chandler Staton kick good	7	0
2	13:51	8	64	3:23	APP	Jalin Moore 7-yard touchdown run, Chandler Staton kick good	14	0
2	8:09	7	57	3:56	APP	29-yard field goal by Chandler Staton	17	0
2	5:52	4	8	2:17	APP	23-yard field goal by Chandler Staton	20	0
3	8:14	7	61	3:59	APP	Jalin Moore 31-yard touchdown run, Chandler Staton kick good	27	0
4	14:54	7	55	2:30	APP	Malik Williams 3-yard touchdown run, Chandler Staton kick good	34	0
"TOP" = time of possession. For other American football terms, see Glossary of American football.							34	0

=== Statistics ===
	1	2	3	4	Total
Mountaineers	7	13	7	7	34
Rockets	0	0	0	0	0

Statistics	APP	TOL
First downs	23	8
Total offense, plays-yards	70–458	50–146
Rushes-yards (net)	53–327	21–22
Passing yards (net)	131	124
Passes, Comp-Att-Int	8–17–0	16–29–3
Time of Possession	35:50	24:10

Team	Category	Player	Statistics
Appalachian State	Passing	Taylor Lamb	8/16, 131 yds
Appalachian State	Rushing	Jalin Moore	22 car, 125 yds, 3 TD
Appalachian State	Receiving	Ike Lewis	4 rec, 67 yds
Toledo	Passing	Logan Woodside	16/29, 124 yds, 3 INT
Toledo	Rushing	Terry Swanson	11 car, 44 yds
Toledo	Receiving	Jordan Fisher	2 rec, 29 yds
