= James Peterson =

James or Jim Peterson may refer to:

- Jim Peterson (1941–2024), Canadian politician and cabinet minister
- Jim Peterson (Montana politician) (born 1946), Montana state senator
- Jim Peterson (baseball) (1908–1975), American baseball player
- James Peterson (writer), American writer and teacher
- J. Hardin Peterson (1894–1978), U.S. representative from Florida
- James D. Peterson (born 1957), U.S. district judge for the Western District of Wisconsin
- James D. H. Peterson (1894–?), Wisconsin state assemblyman
- Jim Peterson (South Dakota politician) (born 1943), South Dakota state senator
- James Peterson (figure skater), American figure skater
- Jim Peterson (American football) (born 1950), American football player
- James F. Peterson, member of the South Carolina House of Representatives

== See also ==
- Tyler James Peterson, perpetrator of the 2007 Crandon, Wisconsin shooting
- Jim Petersen (born 1962), American basketball player and sportscaster
