= Jason Candle =

American football player and coach (born 1979)

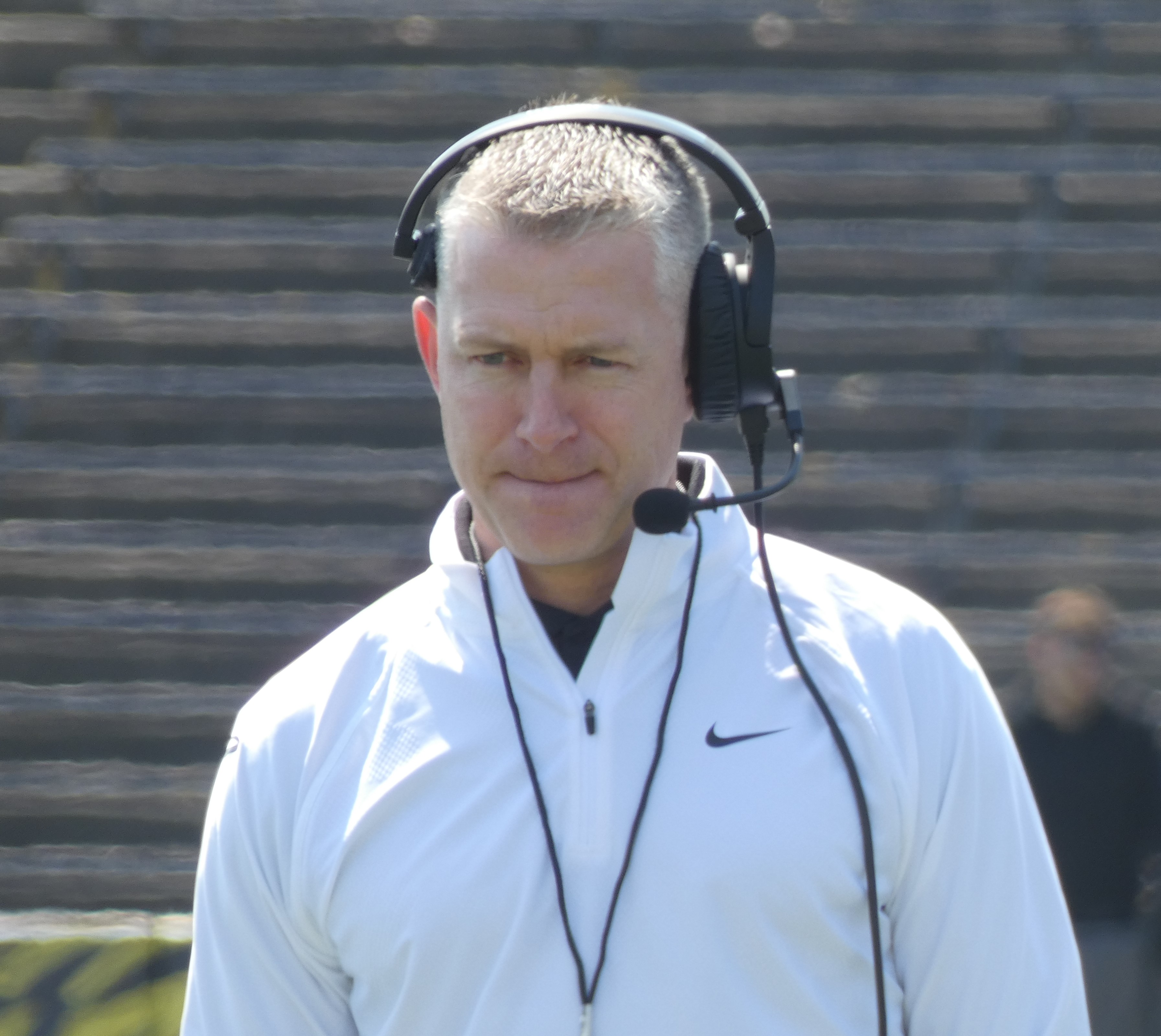
- Candle with Toledo in 2023

Current position
- Title: Head coach
- Team: UConn
- Conference: Independent
- Record: 6–5

Biographical details
- Born: November 12, 1979 (age 47)

Playing career
- 1998–1999: Geneva
- 2000–2001: Mount Union
- Position: Wide receiver

Coaching career (HC unless noted)
- 2003–2006: Mount Union (WR)
- 2007–2008: Mount Union (OC)
- 2009: Toledo (SR/TE)
- 2010–2011: Toledo (WR)
- 2012–2013: Toledo (OC/WR)
- 2014–2015: Toledo (AHC/OC/QB)
- 2016–2025: Toledo
- 2026–present: UConn

Head coaching record
- Overall: 87–49
- Bowls: 3–5

Accomplishments and honors

Championships
- 2 MAC (2017, 2022); 3 MAC West Division (2017, 2022, 2023)

Awards
- 2× MAC Coach of the Year (2017, 2023)

Jason Tyler Candle (born November 12, 1979) is an American college football coach. He is the head football coach at the University of Connecticut, and was previously the head football coach at the University of Toledo, a position he held from 2016 to 2025. Candle had been an assistant at Toledo since 2009, and was previously a coach at Mount Union from 2003 to 2008. He played as a wide receiver at Mount Union and Geneva.

== Playing career ==
Candle is from Salem, Ohio. He played wide receiver, first at Geneva College (1998–1999) and then at Mount Union (2000–2001). Both Mount Union teams he played on won the Division III championship. Candle graduated from Mount Union in 2003.

== Coaching career ==
After graduating, Candle stayed on at Mount Union and joined the coaching staff as the wide receivers coach, a job he held from 2003 to 2006. In 2007, Mount Union promoted him to offensive coordinator, replacing Matt Campbell, who had joined the staff at Bowling Green.

=== Toledo ===
Candle left Mount Union in 2009 to become the slot receivers/tight ends coach at Toledo under Tim Beckman. He was reunited there with Campbell, then serving as run game coordinator. Toledo promoted Candle to wide receivers coach in 2010, where he coached All-American Eric Page. Toledo promoted Campbell to head coach at the end of 2011 after Beckman became head coach at the University of Illinois. Campbell retained Candle and promoted him to offensive coordinator. Candle added the title of associate head coach in 2014.

Toledo named Candle as their head coach on December 2, 2015, after Campbell departed for Iowa State University. He won his head coaching debut in the Boca Raton Bowl 32–17 over Temple.

In his first full season as the Rockets' head coach in 2016, Candle went 9–3 in the regular season. The team made the Camellia Bowl and lost 31–28 to Appalachian State. In the 2017 season, Candle led the team to a 10–2 regular season mark, which won the MAC West. The team won 45–28 over Akron in the MAC Championship. The Rockets' season ended with a loss to Appalachian State in the Dollar General Bowl.

In the 2022 season, Candle led the team to a 7–5 regular season mark that qualified for the MAC Championship. Toledo defeated Ohio 17–7 to win the MAC. Toledo defeated Liberty in the Boca Raton Bowl 21–19.

In 2023, Candle led the Rockets to a perfect MAC record and won MAC Coach of the Year. They were upset by Miami in the MAC Championship game. The team finished with a 11–3 record. He joined Frank Lauterbur as the only head coaches in school history with multiple 11-win seasons.

In the 2024 season, Candle led the Rockets to a 7–5 mark in the regular season highlighted by a 41–17 victory at Mississippi State. The Rockets won the GameAbove Sports Bowl 48–46 over Pitt in six overtimes to finish 8–5.

After defeating Western Kentucky in 2025, Candle surpassed Gary Pinkel for the most wins by a head coach in Toledo football history with 74. He led the Rockets to a 8–4 mark in the regular season in 2025. He did not coach the bowl game.

=== Connecticut ===
On December 6, 2025, it was announced that Candle had signed a six-year contract to become the head football coach at the University of Connecticut, succeeding Jim L. Mora. His hire was first reported by Connecticut news station WFSB.

== Head coaching record ==
Year	Team	Overall	Conference	Standing	Bowl/playoffs
Toledo Rockets (Mid-American Conference) (2015–2025)
2015	Toledo	1–0	0–0	T–1st	W Boca Raton (Note: Promoted to HC for 2015 bowl game)
2016	Toledo	9–4	6–2	2nd (West)	L Camellia
2017	Toledo	11–3	7–1	1st (West)	L Dollar General
2018	Toledo	7–6	5–3	T–2nd (West)	L Bahamas
2019	Toledo	6–6	3–5	T–5th (West)	
2020	Toledo	4–2	4–2	T–2nd (West)	
2021	Toledo	7–6	5–3	3rd (West)	L Bahamas
2022	Toledo	9–5	5–3	T–1st (West)	W Boca Raton
2023	Toledo	11–3	8–0	1st (West)	L Arizona
2024	Toledo	8–5	4–4	T–6th	W GameAbove Sports
2025	Toledo	8–4	6–2	T–2nd	Boca Raton (Note: Candle left Toledo prior to bowl game)
Toledo:		81–44	53–25		
UConn Huskies (NCAA Division I FBS independent) (2026–present)
2026	UConn	6–5			
UConn:		6–5			
Total:		87–49			
National championship Conference title Conference division title or championship game berth
