= Fortune Giles =

American politician

Fortune Giles (1830–1915) was a state legislator in South Carolina. He represented Williamsburg County in the South Carolina House of Representatives from 1870 to 1874. He was elected with James F. Peterson and Tom Pressley, fellow "colored" representatives from Williamsburg County.

Giles was born enslaved in South Carolina. A laborer, he was documented as being literate.

In 1872, he was accused of being involved in bribery.
