= Priestley =

Priestley may refer to:

== Places ==
- Priestley, West Virginia, US, an unincorporated community
- Priestley Glacier, a major valley glacier in Antarctica
- Priestley (lunar crater), on the far side of the Moon
- Priestley (Martian crater)
- 5577 Priestley, an inner main belt asteroid

== People ==
=== Arts ===
- Alice Priestley (born 1962), Canadian children's writer and illustrator
- Bel Priestley (born 2003), English actress and internet personality
- Brian Priestley (born 1940), English jazz writer, pianist and arranger
- Chris Priestley (born 1958), British children's book author and illustrator
- Jason Priestley (born 1969), Canadian-American actor
- J. B. Priestley (1894–1984), English writer and broadcaster
- Joanna Priestley (born 1950), American film director and animator
- Mark Priestley (1976–2008), Australian actor
- Rick Priestley (born 1959), British miniature wargame designer and author
- Robert Priestley (1901–1986), American set decorator
- Tom Priestley (born 1932), sound and film editor

=== Sciences ===
- Henry Priestley (biochemist) (1884–1961), Australian biochemist
- Hilary Priestley, British mathematician
- James Taggart Priestley (1903–1979), American surgeon
- John Gillies Priestley (1879–1941), British physiologist
- Joseph Hubert Priestley (1883–1944), British botanist
- Joseph Priestley (1733–1804), British theologian, dissenting clergyman, natural philosopher, chemist, educator, and political theorist
- Maurice Priestley (1933–2013), emeritus professor of statistics at the University of Manchester
- Raymond Priestley (1886–1974), British geologist and Antarctic explorer

=== Sports ===
- Adam Priestley (born 1990), Gibraltarian footballer
- Akeem Priestley (born 1985), Jamaican footballer
- Dennis Priestley (born 1950), English darts player
- Donald Priestley (1887–1917), English cricketer
- Gerry Priestley (1931–2020), English footballer
- John Priestley (footballer) (1900–1980), Scottish footballer
- Neil Priestley (born 1961), English cricketer
- Robert Priestley (1911–2007), English cricketer
- Tommy Priestley (1911–1985), Northern Irish footballer

=== Other ===
- Anne Priestley (1932–2020), American politician
- Arthur Priestley (1865–1933), English Liberal Party politician and cricketer
- Briggs Priestley (1831–1907), English cloth manufacturer and Liberal Party politician
- Julian Priestley (1950–2017), Secretary-General of the European Parliament 1997–2007
- Mary Priestley (1925–2017), British music therapist
- Monique Priestley, American politician from Vermont
- Philip Priestley (1946–2022), British diplomat
- Wally Priestley, American politician

== Other uses ==
- Priestley College, a sixth-form college
- The Priestley, a proscenium theatre
- Dr. Priestley, a fictional investigator

== See also ==
- Priestly, a surname
