= Clifton Branch =

Stream in the American state of Missouri

Clifton Branch is a stream in southeastern Howell County in the U.S. state of Missouri. It is a tributary to Myatt Creek.

The stream headwaters are at 36°36′57″N 91°42′12″W and the confluence with Myatt Creek is at 36°35′10″N 91°45′00″W.

Clifton Branch has the name of Reverend John Clifton, an early settler.

== See also ==
- List of rivers of Missouri
