= 2018 Bahamas Bowl =

College football bowl game

2018 Makers Wanted Bahamas Bowl
- 5th Bahamas Bowl
FIU Panthers	Toledo Rockets
(8–4)	(7–5)
C–USA	MAC
35	32
Head coach: Butch Davis	Head coach: Jason Candle
	1	2	3	4	Total
FIU	0	14	7	14	35
Toledo	10	0	7	15	32
- Date: December 21, 2018
- Season: 2018
- Stadium: Thomas Robinson Stadium
- Location: Nassau, Bahamas
- MVP: Christian Alexander (QB, FIU) & Edwin Freeman (LB, FIU)
- Favorite: Toledo by 5.5
- Referee: Michael VanderVelde (MW)
- Attendance: 13,510
- Payout: US$225,000

United States TV coverage
- Network: ESPN and Gameday Radio
- Announcers: Steve Levy, Desmond Howard and Laura Rutledge (ESPN); Kyle Wiggs and Rob Best (Gameday Radio)

The 2018 Bahamas Bowl was a college football bowl game played on December 21, 2018. It was the fifth edition of the Bahamas Bowl, and one of the 2018–19 bowl games concluding the 2018 FBS football season. Sponsored by Elk Grove Village, Illinois, the game was officially called the Makers Wanted Bahamas Bowl.

The game featured the FIU Panthers of Conference USA against the Toledo Rockets of the Mid-American Conference. The matchup was announced on November 25, 2018, making this the first bowl matchup of the season to have both teams confirmed.

== Teams ==
This was the fourth matchup between these two teams, with FIU holding a 2–1 lead in the series. They met in the 2010 Little Caesars Pizza Bowl, which FIU won, 34–32.

=== FIU Panthers ===
FIU accepted a bid to the Bahamas Bowl on November 25. The Panthers entered the bowl with an 8–4 record (6–2 in conference). FIU's usual starting quarterback, James Morgan, was unavailable for the game due to a sore shoulder, resulting in backup Christian Alexander getting the start.

=== Toledo Rockets ===
Toledo accepted a bid to the Bahamas Bowl on November 25. The Rockets entered the bowl with a 7–5 record (5–3 in conference).

== Game summary ==
=== Scoring summary ===
Scoring summary

Quarter	Time	Drive			Team	Scoring information	Score	
Quarter	Time	Plays	Yards	TOP	Team	Scoring information	FIU	TOL
1	14:37	2	3	0:23	TOL	Bryant Koback 3-yard touchdown run, Jameson Vest kick good	0	7
1	0:11	12	52	5:10	TOL	28-yard field goal by Jameson Vest	0	10
2	12:44	8	75	2:27	FIU	Anthony Jones 6-yard touchdown run, José Borregales kick good	7	10
2	2:57	7	96	3:21	FIU	Sterling Palmer 36-yard touchdown reception from Christian Alexander, José Borregales kick good	14	10
3	10:35	8	75	4:25	TOL	Jon'Vea Johnson 7-yard touchdown reception from Eli Peters, Jameson Vest kick good	14	17
3	3:47	8	80	4:16	FIU	Anthony Jones 30-yard touchdown run, José Borregales kick good	21	17
4	11:12	9	88	5:17	FIU	Maurice Alexander 16-yard touchdown run, José Borregales kick good	28	17
4	7:21	9	75	3:51	TOL	Diontae Johnson 2-yard touchdown reception from Eli Peters, 2-point pass good (Eli Peters to Cody Thompson)	28	25
4	0:41	13	83	6:40	FIU	Anthony Jones 18-yard touchdown run, José Borregales kick good	35	25
4	0:02	5	75	0:39	TOL	Jon'Vea Johnson 43-yard touchdown reception from Eli Peters, Jameson Vest kick good	35	32
"TOP" = time of possession. For other American football terms, see Glossary of American football.							35	32

=== Statistics ===
	1	2	3	4	Total
Panthers	0	14	7	14	35
Rockets	10	0	7	15	32

Statistics	FIU	TOL
First downs	26	22
Plays–yards	64–459	70–388
Rushes–yards	43–236	27–124
Passing yards	223	264
Passing: comp–att–int	18–27–0	22–37–0
Time of possession	33:00	27:00

Team	Category	Player	Statistics
FIU	Passing	Christian Alexander	17/26, 209 yds, 1 TD
FIU	Rushing	Anthony Jones	15 car, 92 yds, 3 TD
FIU	Receiving	Sterling Palmer	3 rec, 64 yds, 1 TD
Toledo	Passing	Eli Peters	22/37, 264 yds, 3 TD
Toledo	Rushing	Eli Peters	5 car, 43 yds
Toledo	Receiving	Diontae Johnson	6 rec, 98 yds, 1 TD
