= 2016 Camellia Bowl =

2016 Raycom Media Camellia Bowl
- 3rd Camellia Bowl
Appalachian State Mountaineers	Toledo Rockets
(9–3)	(9–3)
Sun Belt	MAC
31	28
Head coach: Scott Satterfield	Head coach: Jason Candle
	1	2	3	4	Total
Appalachian State	7	7	14	3	31
Toledo	7	7	14	0	28
- Date: December 17, 2016
- Season: 2016
- Stadium: Cramton Bowl
- Location: Montgomery, Alabama
- MVP: Appalachian State QB Taylor Lamb
- Favorite: Toledo by 1
- Referee: Ken Antee (C-USA)
- Attendance: 20,300

United States TV coverage
- Network: ESPN
- Announcers: Eamon McAnaney, John Congemi, and Lauren Sisler
- Nielsen ratings: 0.9

The 2016 Raycom Media Camellia Bowl was a post-season American college football bowl game between the Appalachian State Mountaineers of the Sun Belt Conference and the Toledo Rockets of the Mid-American Conference (MAC). Played on December 17, 2016, at Cramton Bowl in Montgomery, Alabama, it was the third edition of the Camellia Bowl and the final matchup of the 2016 NCAA Division I Football Bowl Subdivision (Division I FBS) football season for both teams.

The Appalachian State Mountaineers, the defending Camellia Bowl champions, entered the game with a 9–3 record and a share of the Sun Belt Conference championship (split with Arkansas State). With the exception of a loss to Troy, the Mountaineers had been dominant in conference play and had 12 all-conference players, the most in the Sun Belt. The Toledo Rockets also entered the game with a 9–3 record and had finished second in the West division of the MAC. They led the MAC with seven first-team all-conference selections, and quarterback Logan Woodside ranked among the most prolific passers in the country. The Rockets entered the game as one-point favorites, and the matchup was widely expected to be competitive and among the best matchups of the bowl season. Both teams were said to be evenly matched, with Appalachian State having a superior defense and Toledo having a superior offense.

Appalachian State never trailed during the game, but both teams traded touchdowns throughout the matchup; the first, second, and third quarters all ended with the score tied. In the fourth quarter, the Mountaineers took a 31–28 lead on a 39-yard field goal; Toledo had a chance to tie the game with a 30-yard field goal in the waning minutes, but their attempt sailed wide right. Appalachian State quarterback Taylor Lamb, who combined for 245 yards in passing and rushing and two touchdowns, was named the game's most valuable player.

== Team selection ==
The Camellia Bowl, created in 2014 and owned by ESPN, was designed to match up a team from the Sun Belt Conference with a team from the Mid-American Conference (MAC); the two conferences, which ranked in the lower tier of Division I-Football Bowl Subdivision (Division I FBS), desired additional bowl bids. In 2016, the Sun Belt saw a record six teams selected for bowl games; although the conference only maintained tie-ins for five bowl games, the Idaho Vandals were selected for a bowl game outside of the five agreement bowls. In the MAC, six teams were selected, down from seven the year before. The Mountaineers, who had won the previous year's Camellia Bowl, were selected as the Sun Belt's representative for a second year in a row, while the Toledo Rockets were selected to represent the MAC.

The game was ranked as one of the best bowl matchups of the year by Sports Illustrated, USA Today, and CBS Sports. Toledo entered the Camellia Bowl as one point favorites; the game was anticipated to be close and both teams were said to be evenly matched. Although the Rockets had the 4th-ranked offense in the nation as compared to 55th for the Mountaineers, the 15th-ranked Mountaineer defense was ranked well above the 55th-ranked Rockets defense. Steven Lassan of Athlon Sports regarded both Toledo quarterback Logan Woodside and Appalachian State quarterback Taylor Lamb as among the best in the Group of Five, and both teams also had strong running attacks; Appalachian State running back Marcus Cox (4,960 yards) and Toledo running back Kareem Hunt (4,825 yards) were two of the NCAA's three leading active rushers.

=== Appalachian State Mountaineers ===
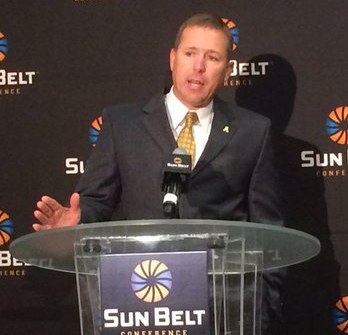
Scott Satterfield was in his fourth year as head coach of the Appalachian State Mountaineers.

The Mountaineers had finished the 2015 season, their first year of bowl eligibility following a two-year transition period from the FCS to the FBS, with an 11–2 record and a win over the Ohio Bobcats in the 2015 Camellia Bowl. Entering the 2016 season, the Mountaineers were anticipated to compete for a conference title. The Mountaineers were projected to win the Sun Belt by Athlon Sports, USA Today, and a poll of the conference's 11 head coaches. The team was returning 16 starters from the previous year; junior quarterback Taylor Lamb was selected to the preseason Davey O'Brien Award watchlist and the preseason All-Conference team along with three other Mountaineers. The head coach of Appalachian State, Scott Satterfield, was in his fourth year at the position.

In their first game of the season, Appalachian State nearly upset the No. 9 Tennessee Volunteers, falling 13–20 in double overtime. Although the Mountaineers would lose to Atlantic Coast Conference (ACC) opponent Miami 10–45, they proved to be dominant in Sun Belt conference play. With the exception of a 24–28 loss to Troy, the Mountaineers won every other conference game by 14 points or more. The Mountaineers finished the regular season 9–3 (7–1 in conference play) and split the conference championship with Arkansas State. In the year-end Sun Belt awards, sophomore running back Jalin Moore, who ran for 1,367 yards and 10 touchdowns, was named the offensive player of the year and cornerback Clifton Duck, who recorded five interceptions, was named the freshman of the year. A total of 12 Appalachian State players were named to the all-conference team, the most of any team in the conference.

The Mountaineer offense was led by a strong rushing attack; the team averaged 247 rushing yards per game, good for 13th in the country and best in the Sun Belt. The team had a "one-two punch" of senior running back Marcus Cox and sophomore running back Jalin Moore. Cox entered the game as the school's all-time leading rusher with 4,960 career rushing yards; he had missed four games earlier in the season, but had recorded 872 rushing yards and 8 touchdowns entering the bowl game. Moore, who had appeared in all 12 of the team's games, was the team's leading rusher, recording 1,367 yards and 10 touchdowns on the season. Quarterback Taylor Lamb's passing numbers were not as high as the previous year, which Steven Lassen of Athlon Sports attributed to the Mountaineers losing three receivers from the previous year. Defense was one of the team's strengths; it ranked 15th nationally in yards allowed and in third-down conversion rate and was particularly strong against the run, allowing opposing teams only 3.9 yards per carry.

=== Toledo Rockets ===
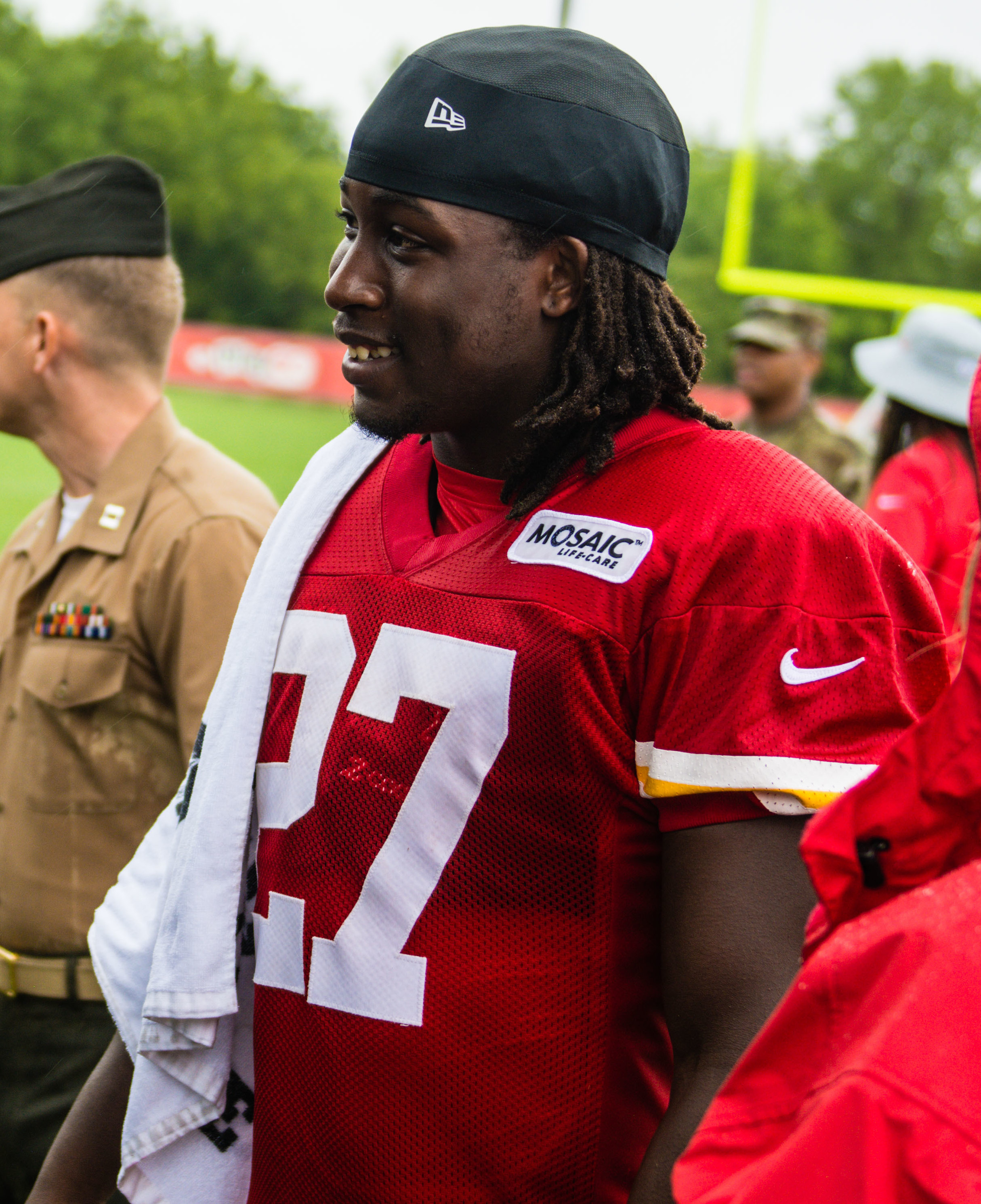
Toledo Rockets running back Kareem Hunt, seen here wearing a Kansas City Chiefs jersey, ranked third in the FBS among active leading rushers.

Toledo finished the 2015 season 10–2; the team had lost the 2015 MAC Championship Game to Western Michigan but had won the 2015 Boca Raton Bowl against No. 24 Temple. Prior to the bowl game, Toledo coach Matt Campbell had resigned to become the head coach of Iowa State; Jason Candle, the offensive coordinator and quarterbacks coach for the Rockets, was appointed the team's new head coach. Thayer Evans of ESPN.com noted Candle as having been successful as an offensive coordinator and a recruiter. Ahead of the 2016 season, Athlon Sports as well as a preseason poll of MAC media members projected that the Rockets would finish second in the West division behind only Western Michigan. Steven Lasssan of Athlon Sports noted Toledo's running backs and offensive line as strengths but that the team would only return four starters on defense from the previous year.

The Rockets finished the regular season with a 9–3 record and were 6–2 in conference play, good for second in the West division behind Western Michigan. The Rockets' only losses were a 53–55 loss to BYU, a 26–31 loss to Ohio, and a 35–55 loss to No. 24 Western Michigan in the last week of the regular season; if Toledo had beaten Western Michigan, they would have won the West division and a spot in the 2016 MAC Championship Game. At the end of the season, Toledo led all MAC teams in selections to the first-team all-conference team with seven, and its 12 players overall were second only to Western Michigan.

Entering the Camellia Bowl, Toledo's prolific offense ranked 4th in the country with an average of 529 yards per game and ranked 19th in points per game, averaging nearly 40. The team was led by quarterback Logan Woodside, who ranked second in the FBS in passing yards; Woodside had thrown for 3,882 yards and 42 touchdowns and had completed 69.1% of his passes. Woodside's leading receivers were Corey Jones and Cody Thompson; tight end Michael Roberts had caught 15 touchdown passes. Kareem Hunt was the leading rusher for the Rockets with 1,355 yards. The team's other leading rushers were Terry Swanson, who had run for 583 yards, and Damion Jones-Moore and Art Thompkins, who both rushed for over 200 yards. On defense, the Rockets ranked 55th in the country in yards allowed, giving up an average of 394 yards per game. The team allowed 25.4 points a game on average and were led defensively by first-team All-MAC defensive end John Stepec as well as second-team All-MAC linebacker Treyvon Hester. Hester was ultimately held out of the game due to injury.

== Game summary ==
=== Broadcast and game notes ===
The 2016 Camellia Bowl was broadcast on television by ESPN and on the radio by ESPN Radio. Eamon McAnaney, John Congemi, and Lauren Sisler served as the announcers for the television broadcast. The weather during the game was cloudy, with temperatures of 74 °F (23 °C) and wind heading south at 10 miles per hour (16 km/h). The referee, the head of the officiating team, was Ken Antee of Conference USA. Overall attendance was recorded at 20,300, down 1,095 from the year before. The game kicked off at 4:37 p.m. central time and ended at 8:00, having lasted a total of three hours and 23 minutes.

=== First quarter ===
Appalachian State won the pregame coin toss and opted to defer to the second half; Toledo chose to receive the ball, and the ensuing kickoff was a touchback. The Rockets were held to a three-and-out and Nick Ellis punted on fourth down to Jaquil Capel of Appalachian State, who fair caught the ball at their 28-yard line. Jalin Moore began the drive with an 11-yard run; Toledo then seemingly held Appalachian State to a three-and-out but were called for pass interference, allowing the drive to continue. The drive culminated in a 16-yard touchdown pass from Taylor Lamb to Deltron Hopkins, and the extra point from Michael Rubino made the score 7–0. The ensuing kickoff was a touchback. On the first play of the drive, Logan Woodside completed a 58-yard pass to Corey Jones, bringing the ball to the Appalachian State 17-yard line. Following two one-yard gains, Woodside threw a 15-yard touchdown pass to Michael Roberts, and the extra point from Jameson Vest tied the game at 7–7.

On the ensuing drive, Appalachian State was able to gain a first down before having to punt the ball. The Rockets started at their own 10-yard line and were held to a three-and-out. After a 59-yard punt from Ellis, Appalachian State began their drive at their 28-yard line. After a short run and an incomplete pass, Cox secured a first down on a 20-yard run. The Mountaineers closed the half with a nine-yard completion on second and eight, bringing the ball to the Toledo 40-yard line.

=== Second quarter ===
The Mountaineer drive stalled at the Toledo 35-yard line after two short runs and an incomplete pass. The Mountaineers lined up in an offensive formation, but Lamb punted the ball 11 yards to the Toledo 24-yard line. The Rockets were again held to a three-and-out, and Ellis punted the ball to the Mountaineer 35-yard line. The Mountaineers went three-and-out on their drive, and Critcher punted the ball 49 yards. Corey Jones returned the punt 25 yards, but the return was called back due to a holding penalty. Toledo began the drive from their own 35 and again went three-and-out. The ensuing punt from Ellis went out of bounds at Appalachian State's seven-yard line.

The Mountaineers responded with a 7-play, 93-yard drive culminating in a 13-yard touchdown run by Cox. The extra point made the score 14–7. Toledo returned the ensuing kickoff to the 23-yard line, where they were held to a three-and-out. Appalachian State fair caught the punt at their 28-yard line, but a personal foul penalty pushed the ball back to their 14-yard line. They went three-and-out on their next drive, and a 30-yard punt was downed at Toledo's 49-yard line. The Rockets would score a touchdown in only two plays: a 25-yard pass from Woodside to Cody Thompson, and a 26-yard run from Kareem Hunt. The extra point tied the score at 14.

The Mountaineers began their next drive at the 25-yard line with 2:45 left in the half. A 9-play, 32-yard drive followed, but Appalachian State was forced to punt after the drive stalled at the Toledo 43-yard line. Toledo fair caught the punt with 14 seconds left in the quarter and ran one play, ending the half with the score tied.

=== Third quarter ===
Appalachian State received the ball to start the second half. After starting their drive with a 13-yard completion from Lamb to Burns, the Mountaineers stalled and were forced to punt. Toledo fair caught the punt at their own 27-yard line and were also held to a three-and-out, punting the ball to the Appalachian State 31-yard line where it was fair caught. The Mountaineers began a 10-play drive that featured two fourth down conversions, capped off with a 13-yard touchdown run from Lamb on fourth down. The extra point from Rubino gave Appalachian State a 21–14 lead with 8 minutes left in the third quarter.

Toledo answered with their own touchdown drive - a 14-play, 75-yard series that ended with a four-yard touchdown pass from Woodside to Thompson. The extra point from Vest tied the score at 21, but Appalachian State kick returner Darrynton Evans returned the ensuing kickoff 94 yards for a touchdown to regain the lead for the Mountaineers. Rubino's extra point gave them a 28–21 lead, but Toledo would again answer with a quick 5-play, 75-yard drive. Hunt capped the drive off with a one-yard touchdown run, and Vest's extra point again evened the score at 28.

On the kickoff, Evans returned the ball to the 14-yard line of Appalachian State, but a holding penalty moved the ball back to the seven-yard line. The Mountaineers would run one play, a Moore rush for no yards, before the quarter expired.

=== Fourth quarter ===
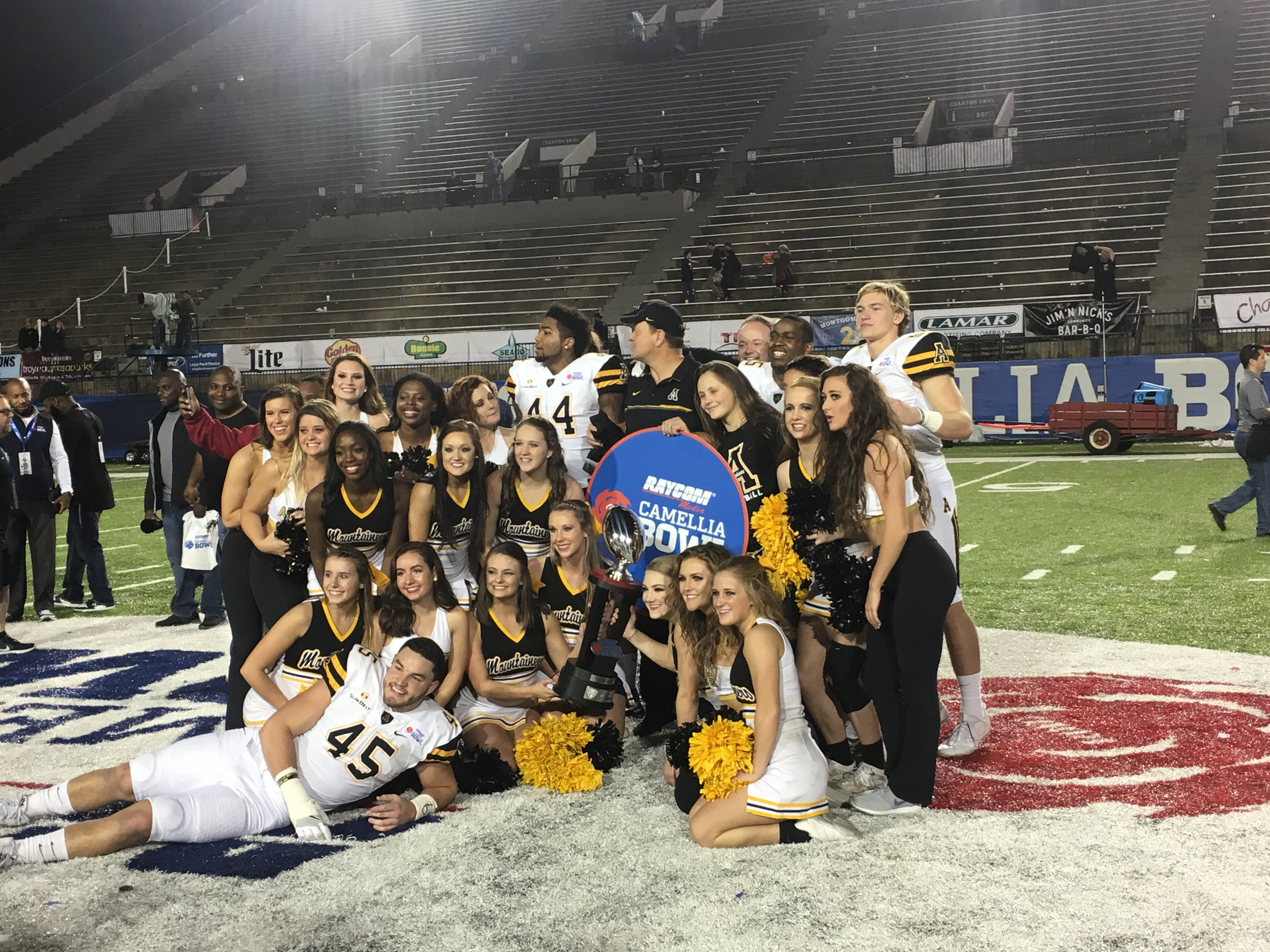
Appalachian State players, coaches, and cheerleaders celebrate their victory after the game.

Although Toledo seemingly held the Mountaineers to a three-and-out, a defensive offsides penalty gave the Mountaineers a second chance on third down, which they converted with a nine-yard pass from Lamb to Ike Lewis. A 13-yard pass to Cox and a 31-yard rush from Lamb moved Appalachian State to Toledo territory, and a third down run of six yards from Cox brought the ball to the Toledo 18-yard line. However, two incomplete passes and a three-yard loss pushed the Mountaineers back to the 21-yard line. A fake field goal ended in an incomplete pass, turning the ball over to Toledo with 10:11 left in the game. The Rockets were held to a three-and-out and punted the ball, which was fair caught at the Appalachian State 43-yard line.

A 26-yard run from Cox moved the ball into Toledo territory, and a 10-yard run from Lamb on a 3rd and 11 set the Mountaineers up with a 4th and 1 at the Toledo 22-yard line. The field goal attempt from Rubino was good, giving Appalachian State a 31–28 lead with 5:14 left in the game. Corey Jones returned the ensuing kickoff to the Toledo 43-yard line. Three consecutive runs of 17, 11, and 13 yards from Hunt advanced the ball quickly into field goal range, but three more rushing attempts from Damion Jones-Moore failed to get a first down. After a delay of game penalty, the Rockets set up to attempt a 30-yard field goal on 4th and 7. However, Vest's attempt sailed wide right, returning the ball to Appalachian State with 1:48 left. With only one timeout left, Toledo was unable to stop Appalachian State from running out the clock, securing a 31–28 win for the Mountaineers.

=== Scoring summary ===
Scoring summary

Quarter	Time	Drive			Team	Scoring information	Score	
Quarter	Time	Plays	Yards	TOP	Team	Scoring information	APP	TOL
1	8:31	10	72	3:56	Appalachian State	Delton Hopkins 16-yard touchdown reception from Taylor Lamb, Michael Rubino kick good	7	0
1	6:59	4	75	1:32	Toledo	Michael Roberts 15-yard touchdown reception from Logan Woodside, Jameson Vest kick good	7	7
2	6:03	7	93	3:23	Appalachian State	Marcus Cox 13-yard touchdown run, Michael Rubino kick good	14	7
2	2:45	2	51	0:19	Toledo	Kareem Hunt 26-yard touchdown run, Jameson Vest kick good	14	14
3	8:04	9	69	4:01	Appalachian State	Taylor Lamb 13-yard touchdown run, Michael Rubino kick good	21	14
3	2:30	14	75	5:34	Toledo	Cody Thompson 4-yard touchdown reception from Logan Woodside, Jameson Vest kick good	21	21
3	2:16	—	—	—	Appalachian State	Darrynton Evans 94 yard kickoff return for a touchdown, Michael Rubino kick good	28	21
3	0:43	5	75	1:33	Toledo	Kareem Hunt 1-yard touchdown run, Jameson Vest kick good	28	28
4	5:14	6	35	3:26	Appalachian State	39-yard field goal by Michael Rubino	31	28
"TOP" = time of possession. For other American football terms, see Glossary of American football.							31	28

== Statistical summary ==
Statistical comparison
	Appalachian State	Toledo
1st downs	25	14
Total yards	416	374
Passing yards	119	247
Rushing yards	297	127
Penalties	2–21	7–63
3rd down conversions	8–19	4–12
Turnovers	0	0
Time of Possession	35:44	24:16

Appalachian State quarterback Taylor Lamb was awarded the game's Bart Starr Most Valuable Player Award, named for Bart Starr, a native of Montgomery and a former Alabama Crimson Tide and Green Bay Packers quarterback. Lamb completed 14 of 32 passes for 119 yards and a touchdown and rushed for 126 yards and a touchdown on nine carries. Toledo quarterback Logan Woodside completed 18 of 26 passes for 247 yards and two touchdowns. The leading receivers for Toledo were Cody Thompson, who caught five passes for 99 yards and a touchdown, and Corey Jones, who caught six passes for 72 yards. The leading receiver for the Mountaineers was Ike Lewis, who caught two passes for 24 yards; eight Appalachian State players caught passes in the game.

Although Toledo outpassed Appalachian State 247–119, Appalachian State outrushed Toledo 297–127 on the strength of Lamb as well as running back Marcus Cox, who rushed for 143 yards and a touchdown on 22 carries; Jalin Moore added another 35 yards on 16 carries. The leading rusher for Toledo was Kareem Hunt, who ran for 120 yards and two touchdowns on 22 carries.

Toledo safety DeJuan Rogers and linebacker Tyler Taafe were the game's leading tacklers, each having recorded 12 tackles; linebacker John Law led the Mountaineers with 11 tackles. Neither team committed any turnovers in the game, and only three sacks were recorded in total (the Mountaineers recorded two while Toledo recorded one).

== Aftermath ==
According to Sports Media Watch, the 2016 Raycom Media Camellia Bowl drew a 0.9 Nielsen rating and 1.5 million viewers, down 25% and 20% from the previous year's edition, respectively. Tom Fornelli of CBS Sports ranked it as the fifth-best bowl game of the season, saying it "definitely lived up to" its potential, and Ted Miller of ESPN ranked it as the seventh-best bowl of the year. As a result of the game, Appalachian State improved their record to 10–3 while Toledo's record dropped to 9–4. Appalachian State became the first team to win two consecutive bowls following a transition from the FCS to the FBS.

Darrynton Evans, who returned a kickoff for a touchdown in the game, was named to the Sports Illustrated and Associated Press All-Bowl teams as the returner. With his 120-yard rushing performance, Kareem Hunt became the all-time leading rusher for Toledo with 4,945 yards; for the Mountaineers, Marcus Cox also secured his fourth consecutive 1,000 yard season. Cox became the 9th FBS player to have four 1,000 yard rushing seasons and the 22nd to record over 5,000 career rushing yards. In 2019, Cox and Hunt were both named by the Football Bowl Association as being among the 150 greatest bowl game players of all time.

In the 2017 NFL draft, three Toledo players (Hunt, Michael Roberts, and Treyvon Hester) were drafted; Hunt and Roberts had played in the game, while Hester had been held out due to injury.
