= James F. Peterson =

American politician

James F. Peterson was a farmer, teacher, and state legislator in South Carolina. He represented Williamsburg County in the South Carolina House of Representatives from 1872 to 1878.

He was elected to the state house from Williamsburg County in 1872 along with Thomas Pressley and Fortune Giles.
