= Henry Roosevelt Pressley =

American musician

Henry Roosevelt Pressley, Sr. (1945 – July 6, 2005) was an American blues and soul instrumentalist from Edgefield County, South Carolina.

== Biography ==
He was born prior to the recognized inception of the American Civil Rights Movement. Pressley was partially named for President Franklin Delano Roosevelt - with respect to the many social ideals and projects Roosevelt promoted to improve the status of citizenship, quality of life, and social/civil rights and justice for blacks.

Henry Roosevelt Pressley, Sr. taught himself to play the guitar as an adolescent, watching other community and family musicians. As he developed, he also learned to play the organ and piano, bass guitar, and drums. He played around with the violin from time to time. Pressley had a great affinity for the tonal resonance of the saxophone. He played early blues rhythms (5 and 7 bar blues), including slide guitar sounds with his father Mack Pressley Sr. and brother Mack Pressley Jr. As the African American South in the 1940s and 1950s was heavily grounded by the presence of the church, Pressley naturally began to play back-up for gospel music, eventually playing back-up rhythm (bass and guitar) for some of the groups on a 1970s through 1980s Sunday morning television program called the Parade of Quartets, hosted by Henry Howard. He has been on many vinyl recordings and has even played back-up parts for James Brown, in his early days. He eventually formed his own soul band, The Mighty Soul Brothers, playing sounds similar to that of Sam Cooke, King Curtis, Otis Redding, and The O'Jays for local Supper Clubs and events. The group often played at Martin's Supper Club in Augusta, Georgia.

Henry Roosevelt Pressley, Sr. died on July 6, 2005, at his home in North Augusta, South Carolina, at the age of 60. His wife, Johnnie Mae Lee Pressley, died on the same date in 2003.
