= Presley Branch =

Stream in the American states of Missouri and Arkansas

Presley Branch is a stream in northern Fulton County, Arkansas and southeastern Howell County, Missouri.

The stream headwaters in Howell County are at 36°32′18″N 91°40′29″W and the confluence with Myatt Creek in Fulton County is at 36°29′47″N 91°41′51″W. The stream flows south roughly parallel to Missouri Route PP then crosses under Missouri Route 142 and enters Arkansas where it turns southwest and enters Myatt Creek about one-half mile south of the border.

Presley Branch has the name of Pinkney Presley, a pioneer citizen.

== See also ==
- List of rivers of Arkansas
- List of rivers of Missouri
