= Thomas Pressley =

American politician

Thomas Pressley was a state legislator in South Carolina. He represented Williamsburg County in the South Carolina House of Representatives from 1872 to 1874. He was elected from Williamsburg along with Fortune Giles and James F. Peterson who were also "colored".

He was sworn in November 26, 1872.
