= Priestly =

Priestly is a surname. Notable people with the surname include:

- Craig Priestly, a rugby footballer
- Miranda Priestly, a character in The Devil Wears Prada
- Paul Priestly, a character in EastEnders

== See also ==
- Priestley (disambiguation)
- Priestly source, one of the proposed sources of the Torah/Pentateuch according to the documentary hypothesis
- Priest, a religious leader authorized to perform sacred rituals and mediate between humans and deities
