= 2015 Boca Raton Bowl =

2015 Marmot Boca Raton Bowl
- 2nd Boca Raton Bowl
Temple Owls	Toledo Rockets
(10–3)	(9–2)
The American	MAC
17	32
Head coach: Matt Rhule	Head coach: Jason Candle
AP / Coaches / CFP; 24 / 24 / 24
	1	2	3	4	Total
Temple	3	0	6	8	17
Toledo	0	12	0	20	32
- Date: December 22, 2015
- Season: 2015
- Stadium: FAU Stadium
- Location: Boca Raton, Florida
- MVP: Offensive: Toledo QB Phillip Ely; Defensive: Toledo LB Ju'Wuan Woodley
- Favorite: Temple by 1
- National anthem: Kendra Erika
- Referee: Kevin Stine (Sun Belt)
- Attendance: 25,908
- Payout: US$400,000

United States TV coverage
- Network: ESPN/ESPN Radio
- Announcers: Allen Bestwick, Dan Hawkins, and Tiffany Greene (ESPN); Dave LaMont, John Congemi, and Brett McMurphy (ESPN Radio)

The 2015 Boca Raton Bowl was a post-season American college football bowl game that was played on December 22, 2015 at FAU Stadium on the campus of Florida Atlantic University in Boca Raton, Florida. It was one of the 2015–16 bowl games that concluded the 2015 FBS football season. The second edition of the Boca Raton Bowl featured the Mid-American Conference West Division co–champion Toledo Rockets against the American Athletic Conference East Division champion Temple Owls. The game began at 7:00 p.m. EST and aired on ESPN. Sponsored by the Marmot outdoor clothing and sporting goods company, the game was officially known as the Marmot Boca Raton Bowl.

== Teams ==
The game featured the Temple Owls against the Toledo Rockets.

=== Toledo Rockets ===
The Boca Raton Bowl was the first game for new head coach Jason Candle. Candle replaced Matt Campbell, who accepted a new head coaching job at Iowa State.

== Game summary ==
=== Scoring summary ===
Scoring summary

Quarter	Time	Drive			Team	Scoring information	Score	
Quarter	Time	Plays	Yards	TOP	Team	Scoring information	TEM	TOL
1	1:13	13	40	5:45	TEM	29-yard field goal by Austin Jones	3	0
2	13:56				TOL	Temple fumble −4 yards out of the end zone for a Team Safety.	3	2
2	12:16	5	55	1:40	TOL	Corey Jones 26-yard touchdown reception from Phillip Ely, Jameson Vest kick good	3	9
2	0:00	6	36	1:10	TOL	38-yard field goal by Jameson Vest	3	12
3	11:38	8	67	3:22	TEM	25-yard field goal by Austin Jones	6	12
3	6:11	7	37	3:50	TEM	35-yard field goal by Austin Jones	9	12
4	12:41	1	80	0:12	TOL	Cody Thompson 80-yard touchdown reception from Phillip Ely, Jameson Vest kick good	9	19
4	5:46	12	74	0:12	TOL	Kareem Hunt 1-yard touchdown run, Jameson Vest kick blocked	9	25
4	2:50	11	68	2:56	TEM	Kip Patton 2-yard touchdown run, 2-point pass by Robby Anderson good	17	25
4	2:29	2	46	0:21	TOL	Kareem Hunt 41-yard touchdown run, Jameson Vest kick good	17	32
"TOP" = time of possession. For other American football terms, see Glossary of American football.							17	32

=== Statistics ===
Statistics	TEM	TOL
First downs	21	18
Plays–yards	75–335	62–435
Rushes–yards	33–99	33–150
Passing yards	236	285
Passing: Comp–Att–Int	23–42–1	20–29–0
Time of possession	31:50	28:10
