= Henry Priestley (biochemist) =

Australian biochemist

Henry Priestley (19 June 1884 – 28 February 1961) was an Australian biochemist.

Priestley was born at Bradford, Yorkshire, England, and his family migrated to Sydney in 1886. He attended Newington College (1898–1901) and the University of Sydney. Priestley was the foundation Professor of Biochemistry at the University of Sydney from 1938 until 1948. Earlier he had been bacteriologist at the Australian Institute of Tropical Medicine in Townsville, Queensland from 1913 until 1918. His main research interests were in physiological chemistry and nutrition. Priestley was President of the Royal Society of New South Wales in 1942.
