= USS Presley =

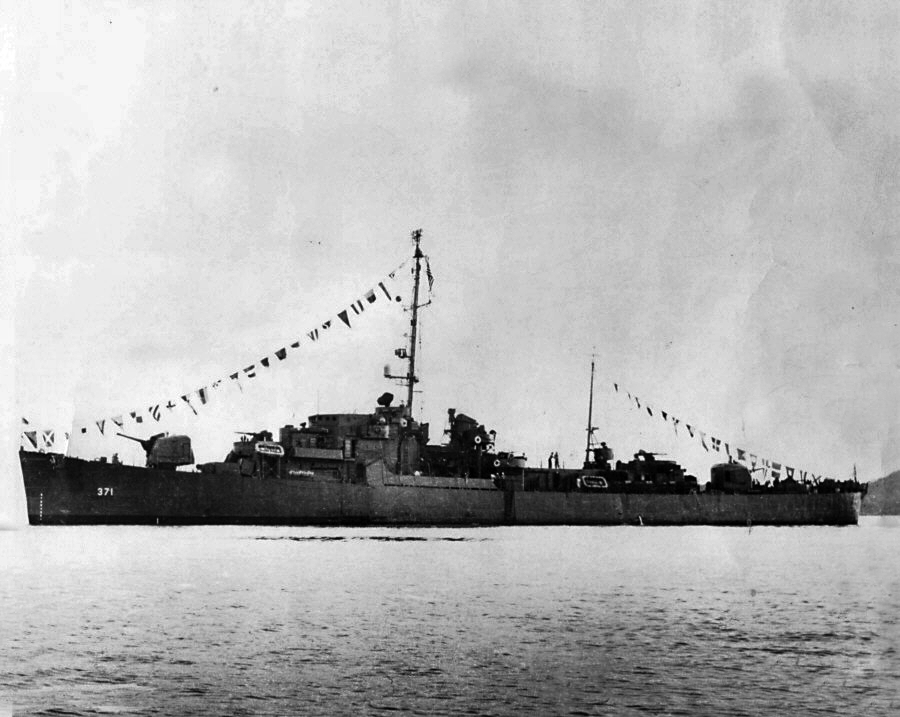
- USS Presley (DE-371) c. 1945

History

United States
- Name: Presley
- Namesake: Sam Davis Presley
- Builder: Consolidated Steel Corporation, Orange, Texas
- Laid down: 6 June 1944
- Launched: 19 August 1944
- Commissioned: 7 November 1944
- Decommissioned: 20 June 1946
- Stricken: 30 June 1968
- Identification: DE-371
- Fate: Sold for scrapping 2 April 1970

General characteristics
- Class & type: John C. Butler-class destroyer escort
- Displacement: 1,350 long tons (1,372 t)
- Length: 306 ft (93 m)
- Beam: 36 ft 8 in (11.18 m)
- Draft: 9 ft 5 in (2.87 m)
- Propulsion: 2 boilers, 2 geared turbine engines, 12,000 shp (8,900 kW); 2 propellers
- Speed: 24 knots (44 km/h)
- Range: 6,000 nmi (11,000 km) at 12 kn (22 km/h; 14 mph)
- Complement: 14 officers, 201 enlisted
- Armament: 2 × single 5 in (127 mm) guns; 2 × twin 40 mm (1.6 in) AA guns; 10 × single 20 mm (0.79 in) AA guns; 1 × triple 21 in (533 mm) torpedo tubes; 8 × depth charge throwers; 1 × Hedgehog ASW mortar; 2 × depth charge racks

USS Presley (DE-371) was a John C. Butler-class destroyer escort in service with the United States Navy from 1944 to 1946. She was scrapped in 1970.

== Sam Davis Presley ==
She was named in honor of Aviation Machinist’s Mate first class Sam Davis Presley who received the Navy Cross for his brave actions during the Battle of the Santa Cruz Islands. Sam Davis Presley, born at Carthage, Mississippi, 17 December 1918, and enlisted in the Navy 7 November 1939. On 30 September 1942 he became an Aviation Machinist’s Mate first class. As his ship, the aircraft carrier Enterprise, came under sustained enemy air attack, he voluntarily abandoned the shelter of his normal battle station. Climbing into a plane parked on the flight deck, he manned the flexible guns in the rear cockpit and commenced an effective fire against the attacking aircraft. As the battle continued, a bomb explosion blew the plane overboard. AM1 Presley was listed as missing in action and presumed dead 27 October 1942.

== Operational history ==
The vessel's keel was laid down by the Consolidated Steel Corp., Ltd. at their yard in Orange, Texas on 6 June 1944. The destroyer escort was launched on 19 August 1944; sponsored by Mrs. Willie Lynn Presley, and commissioned on 7 November 1944.

After shakedown off Bermuda, Presley transited the Panama Canal 24 January 1945 and proceeded to Pearl Harbor for further training. She arrived at Nouméa 22 March, and departed 3 May to escort a group of transports to Leyte Gulf. She subsequently paused at Manus, Saipan, and Ulithi before making two trips to Okinawa. The end of the war found her anchored in Ulithi Harbor.

On 19 September Presley proceeded to Guam for duty, making two trips to Truk where she served as harbor patrol and station ship pending the occupation of that enemy post by U.S. forces. On 5 November the ship was ordered to the United States to be placed in an inactive status. Presley decommissioned on 20 June 1946, and joined the Pacific Reserve Fleet berthed at San Diego, California. She was struck from the Naval Vessel Register 30 June 1968. On 2 April 1970 she was sold for scrap and broken up.
