= Caleb Pressley =

American comedian (born 1992)

- Born: November 13, 1992 (age 33); Asheville, North Carolina, U.S.
- Education: University of North Carolina (BA)

Comedy career
- Years active: 2015–present
- Medium: Podcast, blogs, television
- Football career

No. 16
- Position: Quarterback

Personal information
- Listed height: 6 ft 1 in (1.85 m)
- Listed weight: 205 lb (93 kg)

Career information
- High school: A. C. Reynolds (Asheville, North Carolina)
- College: North Carolina (2011–2014)
- Stats at ESPN

Caleb Pressley (born November 13, 1992) is an American blogger, podcaster, and interviewer for the sports and pop culture blog Barstool Sports. In college, Pressley was a walk-on quarterback on the North Carolina Tar Heels football team. He hosts the Sundae Conversations series on the Sundae Conversation YouTube channel.

== Early life and education ==
Pressley was born to Bill and Heather Lee Pressley – his father was a race car driver. His uncle Robert and cousin Coleman are former NASCAR drivers.

Pressley attended A. C. Reynolds High School in his hometown of Asheville, North Carolina, where he played American football as quarterback for four years. He also played basketball and ran track and field for four years. In football, Pressley guided his team to the North Carolina 4A state championship in 2009, where he was named the game's MVP. He was voted as First-team All-WNC in 2009 and All-Conference in 2010. In total, he passed for 4,385 yards, 39 touchdowns and ran for 1,414 yards and 22 touchdowns during his high school career.

== College ==
Pressley was a walk-on quarterback for the NCAA Division I North Carolina Tar Heels football team beginning in 2011. Pressley played two games in total before leaving on exchange at the University of Edinburgh in 2014 and retiring immediately upon his return. He was given an assistant manager role with the football team, where he had the unofficial title "Supervisor of Morale", where he was entrusted with signaling plays as well as improving the morale of the team.

== Barstool Sports ==
Pressley received national attention with his role as "Supervisor of Morale" for the North Carolina Tar Heels football team. In 2015, he was offered a role with the blog website Barstool Sports after his graduation, after an interview they had with him. In 2016, he launched the Dixie Tour with Barstool Sports, a project providing coverage of college football across America. That same year, he was also involved in a podcast called Young & Happy. In 2020, he started his own podcast called 51 Strokes, as he went on a journey to become a professional golf player. Pressley is a regular interviewer for Barstool Sports, with various viral videos with celebrities. In January 2025, Pressley left Barstool Sports to form his own production company called Bill Joe Productions.

== Appearances in media ==
=== Podcasts ===
- The Yak (2018–2020)
- Young & Happy [with Adam Ferrone] (2016–2019)
- The Caleb Pressley Show (2016)
- 51 Strokes (2020–2022)
- Sundae Conversation (2021–present)
- This Past Weekend (Guest, May 2025)

=== Other Media ===
- Pressley ushered the Concert For Carolina in Charlotte, North Carolina in 2024.
- He revealed the new artist of the year at The 58th Annual CMA Awards in 2024
- Appeared in the music video “Smile” by Morgan Wallen in late 2024.
- Pressley has made several appearances on Theo Von's podcast This Past Weekend
- Hosted Druski's Coulda Been Love on YouTube and later featured on Druski's 2025 comedy tour
