= Myatt Creek =

Stream in the American state of Missouri

Myatt Creek is a stream in northeastern Fulton County, Arkansas and southeastern Howell County, Missouri.

The headwaters of Myatt Creek are in Howell County, Missouri, at 36°38′23″N 91°48′17″W and the confluence with the Spring River is in Fulton County, Arkansas, at 36°22′16″N 91°31′26″W.

Myatt Creek has the name of a pioneer settler who is said to be buried along its course.

== See also ==
- List of rivers of Arkansas
- List of rivers of Missouri
