= Old Dominion Monarchs football statistical leaders =

The Old Dominion Monarchs football statistical leaders are individual statistical leaders of the Old Dominion Monarchs football program in various categories, including passing, rushing, receiving, total offense, defensive stats, and kicking. Within those areas, the lists identify single-game, single-season, and career leaders. The Monarchs represent Old Dominion University in the NCAA Division I FBS Sun Belt Conference.

Although Old Dominion previously competed in intercollegiate football from 1930 to 1941 as the Norfolk Division of William & Mary, the school's official record book only includes records from after the program's reestablishment in 2009, as records from so long ago are incomplete or unavailable.

This means that the Monarchs' official records only include 13 complete seasons, so the entries are often much smaller than would typically be seen on college football programs' top 10 lists. However, quarterback Taylor Heinicke's 14,939 passing yards is seventh in college football history.

These lists are updated through the 2025 season.

== Passing ==
=== Passing yards ===
Career
Rk	Player	Yards	Years
1	Taylor Heinicke	14,959	2011 2012 2013 2014
2	Thomas DeMarco	5,732	2009 2010 2011
3	Hayden Wolff	5,578	2019 2021 2022
4	Colton Joseph	4,251	2024 2025
5	David Washington	4,250	2013 2014 2015 2016
6	Blake LaRussa	3,575	2016 2017 2018
7	Grant Wilson	2,656	2023 2024
8	Steven Williams	1,528	2017
9	Shuler Bentley	1,498	2015 2016

Single season
Rk	Player	Yards	Year
1	Taylor Heinicke	5,076	2012
2	Taylor Heinicke	4,022	2013
3	Taylor Heinicke	3,476	2014
4	Blake LaRussa	3,015	2018
5	Hayden Wolff	2,908	2022
6	David Washington	2,836	2016
7	Thomas DeMarco	2,756	2010
8	Colton Joseph	2,624	2025
9	Taylor Heinicke	2,385	2011
10	Grant Wilson	2,149	2023

Single game
Rk	Player	Yards	Year	Opponent
1	Taylor Heinicke	730	2012	New Hampshire
2	Taylor Heinicke	533	2013	Idaho
3	Taylor Heinicke	497	2012	Coastal Carolina
4	Blake LaRussa	495	2018	Virginia Tech
5	Taylor Heinicke	492	2012	Duquesne
6	Taylor Heinicke	486	2012	Campbell
7	Taylor Heinicke	471	2014	Western Kentucky
8	Taylor Heinicke	450	2013	Liberty
9	Taylor Heinicke	430	2014	Rice
10	Taylor Heinicke	421	2012	Georgia Southern

=== Passing touchdowns ===
Career
Rk	Player	TDs	Years
1	Taylor Heinicke	132	2011 2012 2013 2014
2	Thomas DeMarco	51	2009 2010 2011
3	David Washington	43	2013 2014 2015 2016
4	Colton Joseph	32	2024 2025
5	Hayden Wolff	30	2019 2021 2022
6	Blake LaRussa	22	2016 2017 2018
7	Grant Wilson	21	2023 2024
8	Shuler Bentley	12	2015 2016

Single season
Rk	Player	TDs	Year
1	Taylor Heinicke	44	2012
2	Taylor Heinicke	33	2013
3	David Washington	31	2016
4	Taylor Heinicke	30	2014
5	Taylor Heinicke	25	2011
6	Thomas DeMarco	23	2010
7	Thomas DeMarco	21	2009
	Colton Joseph	21	2025
9	Blake LaRussa	19	2018

Single game
Rk	Player	TDs	Year	Opponent
1	Taylor Heinicke	7	2012	Campbell
2	Taylor Heinicke	6	2012	Coastal Carolina
	Taylor Heinicke	6	2013	Rhode Island
4	Taylor Heinicke	5	2011	Norfolk State
	Taylor Heinicke	5	2011	Georgia Southern
	Taylor Heinicke	5	2012	New Hampshire
	Taylor Heinicke	5	2014	Rice
	David Washington	5	2016	Florida Atlantic

== Rushing ==
=== Rushing yards ===
Career
Rk	Player	Yards	Years
1	Ray Lawry	4,080	2014 2015 2016 2017
2	Jeremy Cox	2,175	2015 2016 2017 2018
3	Blake Watson	2,149	2018 2019 2021 2022
4	Colton Joseph	1,654	2024 2025
5	Colby Goodwyn	1,583	2010 2011 2012 2013
6	Thomas DeMarco	1,456	2009 2010 2011
7	Taylor Heinicke	1,320	2011 2012 2013 2014
8	Mario Crawford	1,105	2009 2010 2011

Single season
Rk	Player	Yards	Year
1	Ray Lawry	1,255	2016
2	Ray Lawry	1,136	2015
3	Blake Watson	1,112	2021
4	Colton Joseph	1,007	2025
5	Ray Lawry	947	2014
6	Blake Watson	921	2022
7	Thomas DeMarco	892	2009
8	Aaron Young	887	2024
9	Tyree Lee	864	2012
10	Trequan Jones	792	2025

Single game
Rk	Player	Yards	Year	Opponent
1	Blake Watson	259	2022	Coastal Carolina
2	Kadarius Calloway	236	2023	Marshall
3	Thomas DeMarco	224	2009	North Carolina Central
4	Ray Lawry	223	2015	Eastern Michigan
5	Ray Lawry	215	2015	Norfolk State
6	Ray Lawry	213	2014	Florida Atlantic
7	Ray Lawry	209	2016	Marshall
8	Quinn Henicle	206	2024	Arkansas State
9	Jeremy Cox	202	2017	Florida Atlantic
10	Ray Lawry	194	2016	FIU

=== Rushing touchdowns ===
Career
Rk	Player	TDs	Years
1	Ray Lawry	45	2014 2015 2016 2017
2	Thomas DeMarco	30	2009 2010 2011
3	Colby Goodwyn	25	2010 2011 2012 2013
4	Colton Joseph	24	2024 2025
5	Jeremy Cox	23	2015 2016 2017 2018
6	Taylor Heinicke	22	2011 2012 2013 2014
7	Angus Harper	15	2010 2011 2012
8	Kesean Strong	14	2015 2016 2018 2019
	Elijah Davis	14	2018 2019 2021
	Blake Watson	14	2018 2019 2021 2022

Single season
Rk	Player	TDs	Year
1	Thomas DeMarco	17	2009
2	Ray Lawry	16	2014
3	Jeremy Cox	13	2016
	Colton Joseph	13	2025
5	Colby Goodwyn	12	2013
6	Taylor Heinicke	11	2012
	Ray Lawry	11	2015
	Ray Lawry	11	2016
	Colton Joseph	11	2024
10	Angus Harper	10	2011

Single game
Rk	Player	TDs	Year	Opponent
1	Thomas DeMarco	4	2009	North Carolina Central
	Ray Lawry	4	2014	Western Kentucky
	Ray Lawry	4	2015	Eastern Michigan

== Receiving ==
=== Receptions ===
Career
Rk	Player	Rec	Years
1	Zach Pascal	233	2013 2014 2015 2016
2	Antonio Vaughan	230	2010 2011 2012 2013
3	Nick Mayers	190	2009 2010 2011 2012
4	Jonathan Duhart	183	2014 2015 2016 2017 2018
5	Larry Pinkard	160	2010 2011 2012 2013
6	Reid Evans	152	2009 2010 2011
7	Isiah Paige	143	2021 2022 2023 2024
8	Travis Fulgham	128	2015 2016 2017 2018
9	Ali Jennings III	116	2021 2022
10	Isaiah Harper	112	2015 2016 2017 2018

Single season
Rk	Player	Rec	Year
1	Nick Mayers	79	2012
2	Johnathan Duhart	74	2018
3	Zack Kuntz	73	2021
4	Larry Pinkard	68	2013
	Zach Pascal	68	2015
6	Zach Pascal	65	2016
7	Antonio Vaughan	63	2014
	Travis Fulgham	63	2018
9	Nick Mayers	62	2011
	Ali Jennings III	62	2021

Single game
Rk	Player	Rec	Year	Opponent
1	Aaron Moore	14	2019	Middle Tennessee
2	Ali Jennings III	13	2021	Western Kentucky
	Isiah Paige	13	2024	Appalachian State
4	Reid Evans	12	2011	Richmond
	Antonio Vaughan	12	2012	New Hampshire
	Nick Mayers	12	2012	New Hampshire
	Zach Pascal	12	2015	UTEP
	Javon Harvey	12	2023	Liberty
9	Nick Mayers	11	2012	Delaware
	Antonio Vaughan	11	2013	The Citadel
	Zach Pascal	11	2015	Charlotte

=== Receiving yards ===
Career
Rk	Player	Yards	Years
1	Antonio Vaughan	3,267	2010 2011 2012 2013 2014
2	Zach Pascal	3,193	2013 2014 2015 2016
3	Nick Mayers	2,688	2009 2010 2011 2012
4	Jonathan Duhart	2,664	2014 2015 2016 2017 2018
5	Larry Pinkard	2,338	2010 2011 2012 2013
6	Travis Fulgham	2,044	2015 2016 2017 2018
7	Ali Jennings III	2,025	2021 2022
8	Reid Evans	1,811	2009 2010 2011
9	Isiah Paige	1,589	2021 2022 2023 2024
10	Blair Roberts	1,345	2011 2012 2013 2014 2015

Single season
Rk	Player	Yards	Year
1	Nick Mayers	1,233	2012
2	Travis Fulgham	1,083	2018
3	Ali Jennings III	1,066	2021
4	Jonathan Duhart	1,045	2018
5	Larry Pinkard	1,020	2013
6	Antonio Vaughan	1,019	2014
7	Zach Pascal	970	2015
8	Ali Jennings III	959	2022
9	Zach Pascal	946	2016
10	Antonio Vaughan	885	2012

Single game
Rk	Player	Yards	Year	Opponent
1	Nick Mayers	271	2012	New Hampshire
2	Ali Jennings III	252	2021	Charlotte
3	Zach Pascal	231	2015	Charlotte
4	Antonio Vaughan	220	2014	Western Kentucky
5	Travis Fulgham	215	2018	Middle Tennessee
6	Isiah Paige	205	2024	Appalachian State
7	Ali Jennings III	200	2022	East Carolina
8	Kelby Williams	197	2023	Texas A&M Commerce
9	Aaron Moore	194	2019	Middle Tennessee
10	Travis Fulgham	188	2018	Virginia Tech

=== Receiving touchdowns ===
Career
Rk	Player	TDs	Years
1	Antonio Vaughan	33	2010 2011 2012 2013 2014
2	Nick Mayers	30	2009 2010 2011 2012
	Zach Pascal	30	2013 2014 2015 2016
4	Jonathan Duhart	28	2014 2015 2016 2017 2018
5	Larry Pinkard	25	2010 2011 2012 2013
6	Travis Fulgham	18	2015 2016 2017 2018
7	Ali Jennings III	14	2021 2022
8	Reid Evans	13	2009 2010 2011
	Blair Roberts	13	2011 2012 2013 2014 2015
10	Marquel Thomas	12	2009 2010 2011 2012 2013
	Prentice Gill	12	2010 2011

Single season
Rk	Player	TDs	Year
1	Nick Mayers	16	2012
2	Antonio Vaughan	12	2014
3	Larry Pinkard	9	2011
	Larry Pinkard	9	2013
	Antonio Vaughan	9	2013
	Jonathan Duhart	9	2016
	Zach Pascal	9	2016
	Jonathan Duhart	9	2018
	Travis Fulgham	9	2018
	Ali Jennings III	9	2022

Single game
Rk	Player	TDs	Year	Opponent
1	Blair Roberts	3	2012	Campbell
	Nick Mayers	3	2012	New Hampshire
	Larry Pinkard	3	2012	Coastal Carolina
	Antonio Vaughan	3	2013	Campbell
	Antonio Vaughan	3	2014	Middle Tennessee
	Zach Pascal	3	2015	Charlotte
	Zach Pascal	3	2015	Florida Atlantic
	Jonathan Duhart	3	2016	Florida Atlantic
	Jonathan Duhart	3	2018	Virginia Tech
	Ali Jennings III	3	2021	Charlotte
	Ali Jennings III	3	2022	East Carolina
	Na'eem Abdul-Rahim Gladding	3	2025	Coastal Carolina

== Total offense ==
Total offense is the sum of passing and rushing statistics. It does not include receiving or returns.

=== Total offense yards ===
Career
Rk	Player	Yards	Years
1	Taylor Heinicke	16,279	2011 2012 2013 2014
2	Thomas DeMarco	7,188	2009 2010 2011
3	Colton Joseph	5,905	2024 2025
4	Hayden Wolff	5,396	2019 2021 2022
5	David Washington	4,712	2012 2013 2014 2015 2016
6	Ray Lawry	4,080	2014 2015 2016 2017
7	Grant Wilson	2,994	2023 2024
8	Blake Watson	2,149	2018 2019 2021 2022
9	Jeremy Cox	2,121	2015 2016 2017 2018
10	Steven Williams	1,791	2017

Single season
Rk	Player	Yards	Year
1	Taylor Heinicke	5,546	2012
2	Taylor Heinicke	4,370	2013
3	Colton Joseph	3,631	2025
4	Taylor Heinicke	3,615	2014
5	Thomas DeMarco	3,179	2010
6	David Washington	3,043	2016
7	Hayden Wolff	2,828	2022
8	Thomas DeMarco	2,813	2009
9	Taylor Heinicke	2,748	2011

Single game
Rk	Player	Yards	Year	Opponent
1	Taylor Heinicke	791	2012	New Hampshire
2	Taylor Heinicke	553	2013	Idaho
3	Taylor Heinicke	542	2012	Coastal Carolina
4	Taylor Heinicke	530	2012	Duquesne
5	Taylor Heinicke	527	2012	Campbell
6	Blake LaRussa	501	2018	Virginia Tech
7	Taylor Heinicke	482	2013	Liberty
8	Taylor Heinicke	475	2014	Western Kentucky
9	Taylor Heinicke	469	2012	Georgia Southern
10	Taylor Heinicke	466	2014	Rice

=== Total touchdowns ===
Career
Rk	Player	TDs	Years
1	Taylor Heinicke	154	2011 2012 2013 2014
2	Thomas DeMarco	81	2009 2010 2011
3	Colton Joseph	56	2024 2025
4	David Washington	45	2013 2014 2015 2016
	Ray Lawry	45	2014 2015 2016 2017

Single season
Rk	Player	TDs	Year
1	Taylor Heinicke	55	2012
2	Thomas DeMarco	38	2009
	Taylor Heinicke	38	2013
4	Colton Joseph	34	2025
5	Taylor Heinicke	32	2014
6	David Washington	32	2016
7	Thomas DeMarco	31	2010
8	Taylor Heinicke	29	2011

== Defense ==
=== Interceptions ===
Career
Rk	Player	Ints	Years
1	Devon Simmons	9	2009 2010 2011 2012
	Craig Wilkins	9	2009 2010 2011 2012
3	Fellonte Misher	8	2012 2013 2014 2015
4	Eriq Lewis	6	2010 2011 2012 2013 2014
	Jerome Carter	6	2024 2025
6	Carvin Powell	5	2009 2010 2011 2012
7	Sean Carter	5	2015 2016 2017

Single season
Rk	Player	Ints	Year
1	Jerome Carter	6	2025
2	Eriq Lewis	5	2011
3	Devon Simmons	4	2009
	Fellonte Misher	4	2015
5	Craig Wilkins	3	2009
	Donald Smith	3	2009
	Carvin Powell	3	2011
	Craig Wilkins	3	2012
	D. J. Simon	3	2013
	Aaron Young	3	2016
	Sean Carter	3	2017
	Angelo Rankin Jr.	3	2024
	Jahron Manning	3	2024
	Will Jones II	3	2024

Single game
Rk	Player	Ints	Year	Opponent
1	Eriq Lewis	2	2011	William & Mary
	Christian Byrum	2	2014	Marshall
	Jahron Manning	2	2024	East Carolina
	Jerome Carter	2	2025	South Florida

=== Tackles ===
Career
Rk	Player	Tackles	Years
1	Jason Henderson	432	2021 2022 2023 2024 2025
2	Jordan Young	350	2017 2018 2019 2021
3	Craig Wilkins	340	2009 2010 2011 2012
4	T. J. Ricks	323	2013 2014 2015 2016
5	Fellonte Misher	288	2012 2013 2014 2015
6	Terry Jones	237	2019 2021 2022 2023
7	John Darr	232	2009 2010 2011 2012 2013
8	Lawrence Garner	223	2017 2018 2019
9	Chris Burnette	197	2009 2010 2011 2012
10	Devon Simmons	191	2009 2010 2011 2012

Single season
Rk	Player	Tackles	Year
1	Jason Henderson	179	2022
2	Jason Henderson	167	2023
3	Wayne Matthews III	135	2023
4	T. J. Ricks	123	2015
5	Craig Wilkins	111	2011
6	Lawrence Garner	111	2019
7	Jordan Young	104	2021
	Terry Jones	104	2023
9	T. J. Ricks	102	2016
10	Lawrence Garner	100	2018

Single game
Rk	Player	Tackles	Year	Opponent
1	Jason Henderson	22	2023	Coastal Carolina
2	Jason Henderson	21	2022	Arkansas State
	Jason Henderson	21	2022	Georgia Southern
4	Jason Henderson	19	2022	Marshall
5	T. J. Ricks	18	2015	Charlotte
	Jason Henderson	18	2022	James Madison
	Jason Henderson	18	2022	South Alabama
	Koa Naotala	18	2024	East Carolina
9	Craig Wilkins	17	2011	Hampton
	Anthony Wilson	17	2016	Southern Miss
	Jason Henderson	17	2022	Georgia State
	Jason Henderson	17	2023	Louisiana
	Jason Henderson	17	2023	Texas A&M Commerce
	Jason Henderson	17	2023	Southern Miss

=== Sacks ===
Career
Rk	Player	Sacks	Years
1	Oshane Ximines	33.0	2015 2016 2017 2018
2	Bunmi Rotimi	19.0	2014 2015 2016 2017
3	Kris Trinidad	14.5	2022 2023 2024 2025
4	Marcus Haynes	14.0	2018 2019 2021 2022
5	Craig Wilkins	13.5	2009 2010 2011 2012
6	Ronnie Cameron	12.0	2010 2011
7	Chris Burnette	11.0	2009 2010 2011 2012
8	Tim Ward	10.5	2015 2016 2017
9	Erik Saylor	9.0	2009 2010 2011 2012
	Denzel Lowry	9.0	2021 2022 2023 2024

Single season
Rk	Player	Sacks	Year
1	Oshane Ximines	12.0	2018
2	Oshane Ximines	8.5	2017
3	Oshane Ximines	7.5	2016
4	Bunmi Rotimi	7.0	2016
5	Deron Mayo	6.5	2010
	Ronnie Cameron	6.5	2011
	Craig Wilkins	6.5	2012
8	Ronnie Cameron	5.5	2010
	Chad King	5.5	2011
	Bunmi Rotimi	5.5	2017
	Jeremy Mack Jr.	5.5	2025

Single game
Rk	Player	Sacks	Year	Opponent
1	Anthony Wilson	3.0	2016	Appalachian State
2	Ronnie Cameron	2.5	2011	Towson
	Alex Arain	2.5	2012	Coastal Carolina
	Mario Thompson	2.5	2024	South Carolina

== Kicking ==
=== Field goals made ===
Career
Rk	Player	FGs	Years
1	Nick Rice	64	2017 2018 2019 2021
2	Jarod Brown	49	2010 2011 2012 2013
3	Ethan Sanchez	35	2022 2023 2024
4	Chris Kirtley	11	2015 2016
5	Brad Davis	10	2016
6	Drew Hareza	8	2009 2010
	Riley Callaghan	8	2025

Single season
Rk	Player	FGs	Year
1	Nick Rice	20	2021
2	Nick Rice	15	2017
	Nick Rice	15	2019
4	Jarod Brown	14	2011
	Nick Rice	14	2018
	Ethan Sanchez	14	2023
7	Jarod Brown	13	2013
8	Jarod Brown	12	2010
9	Ethan Sanchez	11	2024
10	Jarod Brown	10	2012
	Chris Kirtley	10	2015
	Brad Davis	10	2016
	Ethan Sanchez	10	2022

Single game
Rk	Player	FGs	Year	Opponent
1	Drew Hareza	5	2009	Chowan
2	Jarod Brown	4	2010	North Carolina Central
	Nick Rice	4	2021	Hampton
	Riley Callaghan	4	2025	Coastal Carolina
5	Jarod Brown	3	2011	JMU
	Chris Kirtley	3	2015	Charlotte
	Chris Kirtley	3	2015	UTSA
	Brad Davis	3	2016	UMass
	Nick Rice	3	2017	North Texas
	Nick Rice	3	2017	FIU
	Nick Rice	3	2021	Louisiana Tech
	Nick Rice	3	2021	Florida Atlantic
	Ethan Sanchez	3	2022	Georgia Southern

=== Field goal percentage ===
Career
Rk	Player	FG%	Years
1	Brad Davis	83.3%	2016
2	Chris Kirtley	78.6%	2015 2016
3	Nick Rice	76.2%	2017 2018 2019 2021
4	Ethan Sanchez	76.1%	2022 2023 2024
5	Jarod Brown	71.0%	2010 2011 2012 2013

Single season
Rk	Player	FG%	Year
1	Ethan Sanchez	91.7%	2024
2	Jarod Brown	83.3%	2012
	Brad Davis	83.3%	2016
4	Nick Rice	77.8%	2018
5	Chris Kirtley	76.9%	2015
	Nick Rice	76.9%	2021
	Ethan Sanchez	76.9%	2022
8	Jarod Brown	75.0%	2010
	Nick Rice	75.0%	2017
	Nick Rice	75.0%	2019
