= List of Old Dominion Monarchs in the NFL draft =

This is a list of Old Dominion Monarchs football players in the NFL draft.

== Key ==
B	Back	K	Kicker	NT	Nose tackle
C	Center	LB	Linebacker	FB	Fullback
DB	Defensive back	P	Punter	HB	Halfback
DE	Defensive end	QB	Quarterback	WR	Wide receiver
DT	Defensive tackle	RB	Running back	G	Guard
E	End	T	Offensive tackle	TE	Tight end

*	Selected to a Pro Bowl
†	Won a Super Bowl championship
‡	Selected to a Pro Bowl and won a Super Bowl championship

== Selections ==
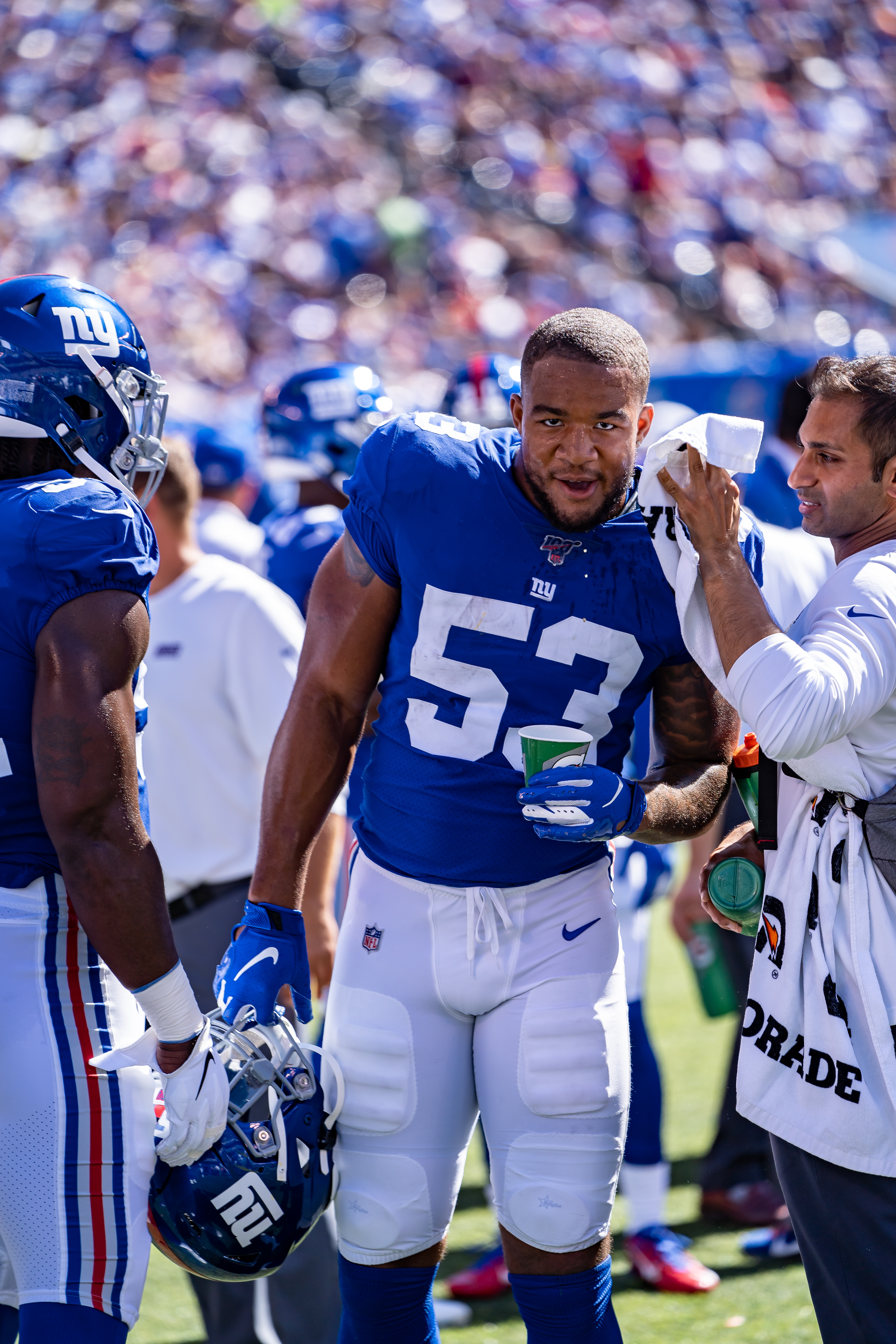
Oshane Ximines was the first Monarch to be drafted in school history. He was selected ninety-third overall by the New York Giants in the 2019 NFL Draft.

Year	Round	Pick	Overall	Player	Team	Position
2019	3	31	95	Oshane Ximines	New York Giants	DE
2019	6	11	184	Travis Fulgham	Detroit Lions	WR
2023	4	1	103	Nick Saldiveri	New Orleans Saints	T
2023	6	32	209	Tre Hawkins	New York Giants	DB
2023	7	3	220	Zack Kuntz	New York Jets	TE

== Notable undrafted players ==
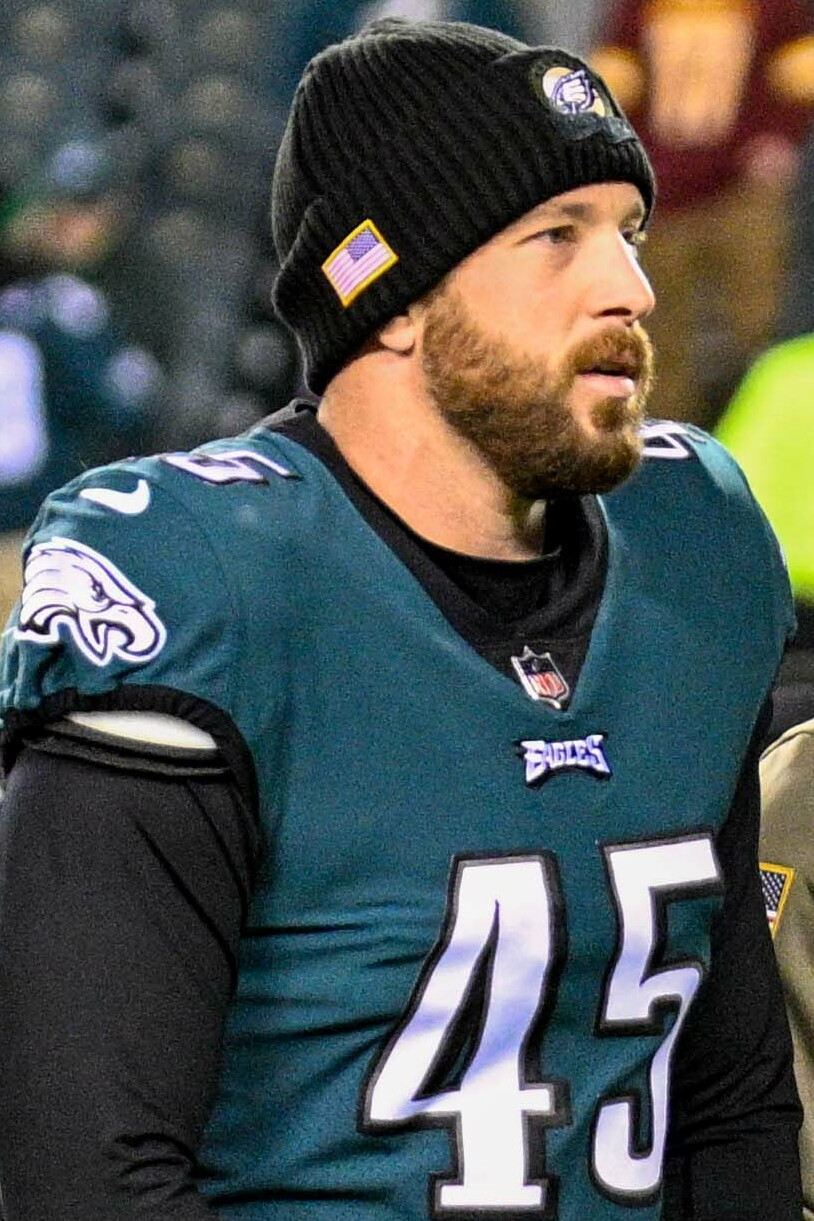
Rick Lovato was the first Monarch to play in an NFL regular season game, attend a Pro Bowl, and win a Super Bowl.

Note: No drafts held before 1920

Debut year	Player name	Position	Debut NFL team	Notes
2012	Ronnie Cameron	DE	Chicago Bears	—
2015	Taylor Heinicke	QB	Minnesota Vikings	—
2015	Rick Lovato^{‡}	LS	Chicago Bears	Pro Bowl (2019); Super Bowl champion (LII, LIX)
2017	Rashaad Coward	T	Chicago Bears	—
2017	Zach Pascal	WR	Washington Redskins	—
2018	Bunmi Rotimi	DE	Chicago Bears	—
2019	Jeremy Cox	RB	Los Angeles Chargers	—
2019	Tim Ward	LB	Kansas City Chiefs	—
2022	Stone Smartt	TE	Los Angeles Chargers	—
