= 2023 Famous Toastery Bowl =

Postseason college football bowl game

- 9th Bahamas Bowl
Western Kentucky Hilltoppers	Old Dominion Monarchs
(7–5)	(6–6)
C-USA	Sun Belt
38	35
Head coach: Tyson Helton	Head coach: Ricky Rahne
	1	2	3	4	OT	Total
Western Kentucky	0	7	7	21	3	38
Old Dominion	21	7	7	0	0	35
- Date: December 18, 2023
- Season: 2023
- Stadium: Jerry Richardson Stadium
- Location: Charlotte, North Carolina
- MVP: Caden Veltkamp (QB, Western Kentucky) & Anthony Johnson Jr. (DB, Western Kentucky)
- Favorite: Old Dominion by 2.5
- Referee: Andrew Speciale (MAC)
- Attendance: 5,632

United States TV coverage
- Network: ESPN
- Announcers: Dave Neal (play-by-play), Tom Luginbill (analyst), and Abby Labar (sideline)

International TV coverage
- Network: ESPN Brazil
- Announcers: ESPN Brazil: Thiago Alves (play-by-play) and Deivis Chiodini (analyst)

The 2023 Famous Toastery Bowl was a college football bowl game played on December 18, 2023, at Jerry Richardson Stadium in Charlotte, North Carolina. Originally planned as the 9th annual Bahamas Bowl, it was renamed and relocated due to renovations at its usual site, Thomas Robinson Stadium in the Bahamas. The game featured the Old Dominion Monarchs from the Sun Belt Conference and the Western Kentucky Hilltoppers from Conference USA. It started at approximately 2:30 p.m EST and was broadcast on ESPN. The Famous Toastery Bowl was one of the 2023–24 bowl games concluding the 2023 FBS football season.

== Relocation ==
The bowl was originally scheduled, as the Bahamas Bowl, to be played on December 16, 2023, with a start time of 11:00 a.m. EST. However, on October 26, it was announced that the game would be held at Jerry Richardson Stadium in North Carolina due to renovations at Thomas Robinson Stadium in the Bahamas. The game also swapped dates and start times with the 2023 Myrtle Beach Bowl. The game was originally sponsored by mortgage lender HomeTown Lenders, and was, before relocation, to be officially known as the HomeTown Lenders Bahamas Bowl. On November 14, 2023, the Famous Toastery restaurant chain was named the title sponsor of the relocated bowl. The game is expected to return to the Bahamas in 2024.

== Teams ==
The game originally planned to feature teams from the Sun Belt Conference and Mid-American Conference (MAC). (Note: All prior editions of the Bahamas Bowl featured teams from the Mid-American Conference and Conference USA.) While the Old Dominion Monarchs from Sun Belt were named as a participant, the MAC did not have enough bowl-eligible teams to fill their spot. The Western Kentucky Hilltoppers of Conference USA (C-USA) were then selected.

This was the eighth meeting between Old Dominion and Western Kentucky; entering the bowl, the Hilltoppers led the all-time series 6–1, with the Monarchs' lone win coming in 2018. From 2014 to 2021, Old Dominion and Western Kentucky played together in C-USA, parting ways when the Monarchs joined the Sun Belt for 2022.

=== Western Kentucky Hilltoppers ===
Western Kentucky entered the season returning star quarterback-wide receiver duo Austin Reed and Malachi Corley and hoping to contend for a C-USA title. They entered conference play 2–2 following a blowout loss to Ohio State and a close loss to Troy. In Week 11, a 38–29 loss to New Mexico State gave the Hilltoppers their third conference loss and ended their hopes of a C-USA title. They clinched bowl eligibility a week later with a 28–23 win over Sam Houston. The Hilltoppers entered the Famous Toastery Bowl with a record of 7–5.

=== Old Dominion Monarchs ===
The Monarchs started the season 2–3 with two one-score losses as well as a blowout loss to Virginia Tech. A three-game losing streak in late October and early November dropped them to 4–6, one loss away from bowl ineligibility. However, the Monarchs managed to win their final two games, a three-point win over Georgia Southern and a one-point win over Georgia State. This allowed them to clinch bowl eligibility in the final week of the season. Old Dominion entered the Famous Toastery Bowl with a record of 6–6.

== Game summary ==
2023 Famous Toastery Bowl

Quarter	1	2	3	4	OT	Total
Western Kentucky	0	7	7	21	3	38
Old Dominion	21	7	7	0	0	35

at Jerry Richardson Stadium, Charlotte, NC

- Date: Monday, December 18, 2023
- Game time: 2:30 p.m. EST
- Game weather: Fair • Temperature: 46 °F (8 °C)
- Game attendance: 5,632
- Referee: Andrew Speciale
- TV announcers (ESPN): Dave Neal (play-by-play), Tom Luginbill (analyst), and Abby Labar (sideline)
- Box score

Game information

First Quarter

- (12:59) ODU – Isiah Paige 1 yard pass from Grant Wilson, Ethan Sanchez kick (Drive: 5 plays, 89 yards, 2:01; Old Dominion 7–0)
- (9:06) ODU – Kadarius Calloway 5 yard run, Ethan Sanchez kick (Drive: 4 plays, 17 yards, 1:16; Old Dominion 14–0)
- (7:54) ODU – Kris Caine 30 yard interception return, Ethan Sanchez kick (Old Dominion 21–0)

Second Quarter

- (13:38) ODU – Grant Wilson 11 yard run, Ethan Sanchez kick (Drive: 10 plays, 81 yards, 3:15; Old Dominion 28–0)
- (8:14) WKU – Dalvin Smith 14 yard pass from Caden Veltkamp, Lucas Carneiro kick (Drive: 10 plays, 77 yards, 5:24; Old Dominion 28–7)

Third Quarter

- (10:24) WKU – Dalvin Smith 18 yard pass from Caden Veltkamp, Lucas Carneiro kick (Drive: 9 plays, 75 yards, 4:36; Old Dominion 28–14)
- (3:04) ODU – Grant Wilson 21 yard run, Ethan Sanchez kick (Drive: 9 plays, 72 yards, 4:05; Old Dominion 35–14)

Fourth Quarter

- (14:09) WKU – Elijah Young 18 yard pass from Caden Veltkamp, Lucas Carneiro kick (Drive: 8 plays, 75 yards, 3:55; Old Dominion 35–21)
- (9:42) WKU – Dalvin Smith 14 yard pass from Caden Veltkamp, Lucas Carneiro kick (Drive: 9 plays, 69 yards, 4:12; Old Dominion 35–28)
- (0:19) WKU – K.D. Hutchinson 15 yard pass from Caden Veltkamp, Lucas Carneiro kick (Drive: 9 plays, 64 yards, 2:34; Tied 35–35)

Overtime

- WKU – Lucas Carneiro 29 yard field goal (Drive: 6 plays, 14 yards; Western Kentucky 38–35)

=== Statistics ===
Statistics	WKU	ODU
First downs	29	12
Plays–yards	92–471	57–319
Rushes–yards	35–73	31–196
Passing yards	398	123
Passing: comp–att–int	43–56–2	13–22–1
Time of possession	40:39	19:21

Team	Category	Player	Statistics
Western Kentucky	Passing	Caden Veltkamp	40/52, 383 yards, 5 TD, 1 INT
Western Kentucky	Rushing	Caden Veltkamp	19 rushes, 53 yards
Western Kentucky	Receiving	Jimmy Holiday	4 receptions, 93 yards
Old Dominion	Passing	Grant Wilson	13/22, 123 yards, 1 TD, 1 INT
Old Dominion	Rushing	Grant Wilson	8 rushes, 126 yards, 2 TD
Old Dominion	Receiving	Isiah Paige	4 receptions, 63 yards, 1 TD
