= Thomas DeMarco =

American gridiron football player (born 1989)

No. 14
- Position: Quarterback

Personal information
- Born: January 16, 1989 (age 37); Palm Desert, California, U.S.
- Listed height: 5 ft 11 in (1.80 m)
- Listed weight: 200 lb (91 kg)

Career information
- High school: Palm Desert
- College: Old Dominion
- NFL draft: 2012: undrafted

Career history
- 2012–2013: BC Lions
- 2014–2015: Ottawa Redblacks
- 2016: Edmonton Eskimos

Career CFL statistics
- TD–INT: 11–11
- Passing yards: 1,559
- QB rating: 70.7
- Stats at CFL.ca

Thomas DeMarco (born January 16, 1989) is an American former professional football quarterback who played for the BC Lions, Ottawa Redblacks and the Edmonton Eskimos of the Canadian Football League (CFL).

== College career ==
=== College of the Desert ===
DeMarco started his collegiate career at College of the Desert in Palm Desert. While there, he passed for 1,792 yards and 14 touchdowns during the 2008 season. He also rushed for 8 touchdowns.

=== Old Dominion ===
In 2009, DeMarco transferred to Old Dominion University. DeMarco dressed for 35 games over three seasons at Old Dominion and started 27 times. He passed for 5,732 yards with a 57.7 completion percentage and racked up 51 touchdowns. DeMarco also ran for 1,456 yards and 30 TDs. As a junior in 2010, DeMarco ranked seventh nationally in total offence at 289 yards per game. He was named as an Honorable Mention All-American in 2010 by Consensus Draft Services. During a game against University of Massachusetts in 2011, a defensive end rolled over his ankle. True freshman Taylor Heinicke would play the rest of the game, later becoming the Monarchs' starting quarterback.

== Professional career ==
=== BC Lions ===
While DeMarco did not get drafted by a National Football League team, he signed a two-year deal with the BC Lions on May 14, 2012. He started the season as the Lions' third-string quarterback, behind Travis Lulay and Mike Reilly. On October 6, 2012, DeMarco made his pro debut against the Calgary Stampeders, completing 3 of 6 passes for 35 yards; his first completion was a five-yard pass to Geroy Simon.

During the 2012 offseason, Reilly was traded to the Edmonton Eskimos, making DeMarco the backup to Lulay. Despite his small size for a quarterback, DeMarco found a niche as the Lions' short-yardage quarterback.

On September 15, 2013, DeMarco (while in relief of an injured Lulay) threw his first career touchdown, a 14-yard pass to Marco Iannuzzi against the Montreal Alouettes.

The following week, DeMarco would get the start (due to Lulay's shoulder injury) against the Saskatchewan Roughriders. He led the team on a late drive down the field, which set up a 42-yard Paul McCallum field goal to win the game 24-22. He finished the game going 18 for 33, with 208 yards and 2 touchdowns. DeMarco would struggle the following weeks, eventually getting replaced by Buck Pierce during the October 19 game against Edmonton. Lulay returned as starter for the playoffs, but the Lions were eliminated by the eventual Grey Cup Champions, Saskatchewan. DeMarco finished the year with 1,325 yards passing, 10 touchdowns and 8 interceptions.

=== Ottawa Redblacks ===
On December 16, 2013, Ottawa selected quarterbacks DeMarco and Kevin Glenn (from Calgary) in the first round of the 2013 CFL Expansion Draft (the first round being designated for Imports). On February 4, 2014, after being released by the Hamilton Tiger-Cats, quarterback and veteran CFLer Henry Burris signed a three-year contract with the Redblacks, thus creating a quarterback controversy between Burris, Glenn, and DeMarco. On May 13, 2014, Glenn was traded to the BC Lions during the 2014 CFL draft in exchange for the fifth overall pick in that draft. DeMarco began the season as the 2nd string QB behind veteran Henry Burris. DeMarco only appeared in 4 games in the 2014 CFL season before suffering a season-ending ACL tear in his left knee. He has the unusual distinction of punting for the first Redblacks touchdown at TD Place Stadium when his onside punt was recovered for a touchdown by Dobson Collins on August 2, 2014. DeMarco dressed for all 18 regular season games and three post-season games in 2015, but played sparingly due to the health and strong play by league MOP, Henry Burris. He became a free agent on February 9, 2016.

=== Edmonton Eskimos ===
DeMarco signed as a free agent with the Edmonton Eskimos on April 16, 2016. He was released July 10, 2016. The Eskimos' starting quarterback Mike Reilly got banged up in the first round of the playoffs, which prompted the Eskimos to sign DeMarco back to their roster ahead of the Eastern Final. DeMarco was released by the Eskimos on December 13, 2016.
