= Ricky Rahne =

American football player and coach (born 1980)

Current position
- Title: Head coach
- Team: Old Dominion
- Conference: Sun Belt
- Record: 33–41

Biographical details
- Born: July 19, 1980 (age 46); Morrison, Colorado, U.S.

Playing career
- 1999–2001: Cornell
- Position: Quarterback

Coaching career (HC unless noted)
- 2004: Holy Cross (assistant DL)
- 2005: Cornell (RB)
- 2006: Kansas State (GA)
- 2007–2008: Kansas State (RB)
- 2009–2010: Kansas State (TE)
- 2011–2013: Vanderbilt (QB)
- 2014–2015: Penn State (QB)
- 2016–2017: Penn State (TE)
- 2018–2019: Penn State (OC/QB)
- 2020–present: Old Dominion

Head coaching record
- Overall: 33–41
- Bowls: 1–2

Ricky Rahne (born July 19, 1980) is an American football coach and former player. He is the head football coach for Old Dominion University, a position he has held since 2020. He played college football at Cornell.

== Early life ==
A native of Morrison, Colorado, Rahne attended Bear Creek High School in Lakewood, where he lettered in football and track and field. During his senior season, Rahne led all Colorado quarterbacks with 3,114 passing yards for 33 touchdowns.

== College playing career ==
Rahne was a three-year starting quarterback at Cornell University from 1999 to 2001.

== Coaching career ==
=== Early coaching career ===
Rahne spent the 2004 season as a defensive assistant at Holy Cross, primarily working with the defensive ends. Other important roles included coordinating the scout teams, breaking down opponents' game film and assisting the defensive coordinator in developing games plans. Cornell head coach Jim Knowles hired Rahne as the Big Red's running back coach in 2005.

=== Kansas State ===
In 2006, Rahne served as an offensive graduate assistant at Kansas State under Head coach Ron Prince and Offensive coordinator James Franklin. Scott Frost served as a defensive graduate assistant for the Wildcats during the same period. In 2007, Rahne was promoted to running backs coach where he served for two seasons. After the firing of Ron Prince, Rahne was retained by Head coach Bill Snyder as the tight ends coach, a position he would hold for the 2009 and 2010 seasons.

=== Vanderbilt ===
In December 2010, Rahne was hired away from Kansas State to lead the quarterbacks for James Franklin and the Vanderbilt Commodores. At the time of the hire Kansas State head coach Bill Snyder was quoted as saying, “I am proud of Ricky, He is a fine young coach and person. His desire was to become a quarterback coach and that opportunity presented itself at Vanderbilt. I am happy for him and his wonderful family.” It is a position he would hold for three successful seasons mentoring quarterbacks Jordan Rodgers and Austyn Carta-Samuels. Rodgers, under Rahne's guidance, finished 2012 season completing 60 percent of his passes for 2,539 yards, and 15 touchdowns to 5 interceptions. Following the season, Rodgers would sign a free agent deal with the NFL Jacksonville Jaguars.

=== Penn State ===
Following coach James Franklin, Rahne spent the 2014 and 2015 seasons as the Penn State Nittany Lions quarterbacks coach. Working with quarterback Christian Hackenberg, Rahne helped him break all of the Nittany Lions major career passing records. Hackenberg finished his career with 693 completions, 8,457 passing yards, 48 touchdown passes, 9 career 300-yard passing games, and 21 200-yard passing games. After the final game of the 2015 regular season, John Donovan was fired as Penn States offensive coordinator, and replaced by Rahne as the interim to coach the TaxSlayer Bowl. During preparation for the bowl game, it was announced that ex-Fordham Head coach, Joe Moorhead would be taking over as offensive coordinator and quarterbacks coach for the 2016 season. Rahne took over as tight ends coach, a position that was previously held by Donovan.

During his time as the tight ends coach Rahne mentored Mackey Award finalist Mike Gesicki as he broke the Penn State career record for receptions (123), receiving yards (1,419) and touchdowns (15) by a tight end. Gesicki was selected first-team All-Big Ten in 2017 and second team in 2016. Gesicki set single-season records at Penn State for receptions (51), receiving yards (679) and touchdown catches (9) by a tight end.

On December 1, 2017, Rahne was named Penn States offensive coordinator and quarterbacks coach after Joe Moorhead left the Nittany Lions to become the head coach at Mississippi State.

In 2018, Penn State saw its best rushing production in 10 years, averaging 204.9 yards per game. That was good enough to finish 29th nationally, and fifth in the Big Ten. That season the offensive line was led by center Connor McGovern, who was drafted in the 3rd round of the 2019 NFL draft, and tackle Ryan Bates. Junior running back Miles Sanders, who was drafted in the 2nd round of the 2019 NFL Draft, rushed for over 1,200 yards and nine touchdowns. Senior quarterback Trace McSorley, who was drafted in the sixth round of the 2019 NFL Draft, passed for 2,284 yards and 16 touchdowns. He also ran for 723 yards and 11 scores. Both Sanders and McSorley earned second team All-Big Ten honors.

In 2019, Rahne helped lead the Nittany Lion offense to 34 points and 204.9 rushing yards per game. Wide receiver K. J. Hamler, guard Steven Gonzalez and tight end Pat Freiermuth earned second team All-Big Ten honors. Hamler was selected by the Denver Broncos with the 46th overall pick in the second round of the 2020 NFL draft.

=== Old Dominion ===
On December 9, 2019, it was announced that Rahne had been selected as the next head football coach at Old Dominion. On August 10, 2020, Old Dominion University announced the cancellation of the football season due to the COVID-19 pandemic.

== Head coaching record ==
Year	Team	Overall	Conference	Standing	Bowl/playoffs
Old Dominion Monarchs (Conference USA) (2020–2021)
2020	No team—COVID-19				
2021	Old Dominion	6–7	5–3	T–2nd (East)	L Myrtle Beach
Old Dominion Monarchs (Sun Belt Conference) (2022–present)
2022	Old Dominion	3–9	2–6	7th (East)	
2023	Old Dominion	6–7	5–3	T–3rd (East)	L Famous Toastery
2024	Old Dominion	5–7	4–4	T–3rd (East)	
2025	Old Dominion	10–3	6–2	2nd (East)	W Cure
2026	Old Dominion	3–8	2–5	(East)	
Old Dominion:		33–41	24–23		
Total:		33–41			
