= Jason Henderson (American football) =

American football player

No. 42
- Position: Linebacker

Personal information
- Listed height: 6 ft 1 in (1.85 m)
- Listed weight: 225 lb (102 kg)

Career information
- High school: Delaware Valley (Milford, Pennsylvania)
- College: Old Dominion (2021–2025)

Awards and highlights
- First-team All-American (2023); Second-team All-American (2022); 2× First team All-Sun Belt (2022, 2023)
- Stats at ESPN

William Jason Henderson is an American former college football linebacker for the Old Dominion Monarchs.

== Early life ==
Henderson attended Delaware Valley High School in Dingmans Ferry, Pennsylvania, where he was a two-way player in football. He rushed for 1,411 yards and 24 touchdowns and hauled in 42 receptions for 740 yards and 11 touchdowns. On defense he notched 529 tackles, 14 sacks, 11 pass deflections, three interceptions, seven fumble recoveries, a forced fumble, and two blocked punts. In 2020, Henderson committed to play college football at Old Dominion University.

== College career ==
In week 12 of the 2021 season, Henderson forced a fumble that helped Old Dominion clinch their 24-17 win over Middle Tennessee. He finished the 2021 season with 78 tackles with four being for a loss, a sack, a fumble recovery, and a forced fumble, earning Freshman All-American honors.

In the 2022 season opener, Henderson recorded 18 tackles, which tied the school record, with 1.5 going for a loss, and two pass deflections in a 20–17 upset win over Virginia Tech, earning Sun Belt Conference defensive player of the week honors. In week four against Arkansas State, he broke the school record with 21 tackles. Four weeks later he broke his own record, tallying 22 tackles versus Georgia Southern. Henderson finished his breakout 2022 season notching 186 tackles with ten being for a loss, a sack, and three pass deflections. He led the nation in tackles. For his performance on the season, Henderson was named the Touchdown Club of Richmond Linebacker of the Year. Henderson was also named first-team all Sun-Belt, and a second-team All-American, being the first Old Dominion player to do so at the FBS rank.

Ahead of the 2023 season, Henderson was named to the Bronko Nagurski Trophy watchlist, as well as the preseason Sun Belt defensive player of the year.

After receiving a significant knee injury against Georgia State at the end of the 2023 season, Henderson redshirted his 2024 season after playing in the opener against South Carolina. He announced his retirement from football during the 2025 season.

=== College statistics ===
Season	Team	GP	Defense				
Season	Team	GP	Tckl	TfL	Sck	Int	FF
2021	Old Dominion	12	80	4.0	1.0	0	2
2022	Old Dominion	12	186	10.0	1.0	0	0
2023	Old Dominion	12	170	19.5	4.5	0	1
2024	Old Dominion	1	3	0.0	0.0	0	0
2025	Old Dominion	1	5	1.0	0.0	0	0
Career		38	444	34.5	6.5	0	3

== See also ==
- List of NCAA major college football yearly tackles leaders
