= Chris Burnette =

American football player (born 1991)

Profile
- Position: Guard

Personal information
- Born: April 14, 1991 (age 35); Columbus, Georgia, U.S.
- Listed height: 6 ft 2 in (1.88 m)
- Listed weight: 306 lb (139 kg)

Career information
- High school: Troup County (LaGrange, Georgia)
- College: Georgia (2009–2013)
- NFL draft: 2014: undrafted

Career history
- Miami Dolphins (2014)*
- * Offseason or practice squad member only

Awards and highlights
- Second-team All-SEC (2012)
- Stats at Pro Football Reference

Chris Burnette (born April 14, 1991) is an American former professional football offensive guard.

== Professional career ==
=== Miami Dolphins ===
On April 27, 2013, he signed with the Miami Dolphins as an undrafted free agent following the conclusion of the 2013 NFL draft. On August 23, 2013, he was waived by the Dolphins.
