= Grant Wilson (American football) =

American football player

No. 2 – Indiana Hoosiers
- Position: Quarterback
- Class: (redshirt) Senior

Personal information
- Born: December 26, 2001 (age 24)
- Listed height: 6 ft 3 in (1.91 m)
- Listed weight: 220 lb (100 kg)

Career information
- High school: Yorktown (Arlington County, Virginia)
- College: Fordham (2020–2022); Old Dominion (2023–2024); Indiana (2025–present)

Awards and highlights
- CFP national champion (2025)
- Stats at ESPN

Grant Wilson is an American college football quarterback for the Indiana Hoosiers. He previously played for the Fordham Rams and Old Dominion Monarchs.

== Early life ==
Wilson grew up in Arlington, Virginia, and attended Yorktown High School where he played football and lacrosse. As a senior, he completed 179 out of 264 passing attempts for 2,632 yards and 24 touchdowns. He was a two-time District 6A Offensive Player of the Year, First Team All-District selection, and Offensive Player of the Year. Despite coming out of high school unranked, he received interest from schools such as Howard and Fairmont State. He ultimately chose to play at Fordham University, a private college in New York.

== College career ==
=== Fordham ===
Wilson did not see action during his true freshman season. In 2021, He appeared in three games during his sophomore season and completed six out of eight passing attempts for 52 yards. During his game against Bucknell, Wilson completed a perfect four out of four passing attempts for 36 yards. During the 2022 season, he appeared in four games and completed four out of five passing attempts for 41 yards and two touchdowns. On December 6, 2022, Wilson announced that he had entered the transfer portal. Two days later, on December 8, he announced that he would be transferring to Old Dominion.

=== Old Dominion ===
During the 2023 season, Wilson was named as the starting quarterback. After his second game with the Monarchs, in which he threw four touchdowns in a win against Louisiana, he was named to the Davey O'Brien Award's Great 8 List and the DC Touchdown Club Washington Metro College Player of the Week. He lead the Monarchs to a 5–5 record in the regular season and an appearance in the 2023 Famous Toastery Bowl. They lost 38–35 against Western Kentucky.

Wilson returned as the starting quarterback for the 2024 season. In the season opener against South Carolina, he went 22-of-38 for 197 passing yards with one touchdown and two interceptions, while also rushing for 16 yards and a touchdown in a 23–19 loss that was a near upset. The following week, in a loss against East Carolina, he suffered an injury that kept him out of the next game against Virginia Tech. He returned in Week 4 against Bowling Green but was injured once again, which kept him out for the next nine games and the remainder of the season. On the season, he completed 48 of 86 passes for 507 yards with four touchdowns and three interceptions, while also rushing for 47 yards and one touchdown.

=== Indiana ===
On January 3, 2025, it was announced that Wilson would transfer to play for the Indiana Hoosiers for the 2025 season. In week 9 of the 2026 season against the Minnesota Golden Gophers, Wilson came in at quarterback in relief of starter Josh Hoover, and led the offense downfield, throwing a touchdown to Shazz Preston that was called back, before on the next drive leading Indiana downfield where Paddy McAteer kicked a 60 yard field goal to bring the game into overtime. In overtime, Wilson threw the ball to Charlie Becker for a touchdown, before Indiana's defense held Minnesota to win the game.

=== College statistics ===
Legend
**Bold**	Career high

Season	Team	Games			Passing									Rushing			
Season	Team	GP	GS	Record	Cmp	Att	Pct	Yds	Y/A	Lng	TD	Int	Rtg	Att	Yds	Avg	TD
2020	Fordham	0	0	—	Redshirt												
2021	Fordham	3	0	—	6	8	75.0	52	6.5	19	0	0	129.6	3	2	0.7	0
2022	Fordham	4	0	—	4	5	80.0	41	**8.2**	19	2	0	**280.9**	8	25	3.1	0
2023	Old Dominion	**12**	**11**	5–6	**178**	**312**	57.1	**2,149**	6.9	**78**	**17**	**8**	127.8	**130**	**291**	2.2	**4**
2024	Old Dominion	3	3	1–2	48	86	55.8	507	5.9	75	4	3	113.7	28	47	1.7	1
2025	Indiana	3	0	—	1	1	**100.0**	5	5.0	5	0	0	142.0	1	6	**6.0**	0
2026	Indiana	6	1	**1–0**	30	49	61.2	535	10.9	65	5	1	182.4	14	65	4.6	1
Career		31	15	7–8	267	461	57.9	3,289	7.1	78	28	12	132.7	184	436	2.4	6
