= 2023 Old Dominion Monarchs football team =

American college football season

2023 Old Dominion Monarchs football

Famous Toastery Bowl, L 35–38 ^{OT} vs. Western Kentucky
- Conference: Sun Belt Conference
- East Division
- Record: 6–7 (5–3 Sun Belt)
- Head coach: Ricky Rahne (4th season)
- Offensive coordinator: Kevin Decker (1st season)
- Offensive scheme: Veer and shoot
- Defensive coordinator: Blake Seiler (4th season)
- Base defense: 3–2–6
- Home stadium: S.B. Ballard Stadium

2023 Sun Belt Conference football standings
	Conf.			Overall
Team	W		L	W		L
East Division
James Madison* x	7	–	1	11	–	2
Appalachian State y	6	–	2	9	–	5
Coastal Carolina	5	–	3	8	–	5
Old Dominion	5	–	3	6	–	7
Georgia State	3	–	5	7	–	6
Marshall	3	–	5	6	–	7
Georgia Southern	3	–	5	6	–	7
West Division
Troy xy$	7	–	1	11	–	3
Texas State	4	–	4	8	–	5
Arkansas State	4	–	4	6	–	7
South Alabama	4	–	4	7	–	6
Louisiana	3	–	5	6	–	7
Southern Miss	2	–	6	3	–	9
Louisiana–Monroe	0	–	8	2	–	10
Championship: Troy 49, Appalachian State 23
$ – Conference champion; x – Division champion/co-champions; y – Championship game participant; * – Ineligible for postseason play due to FCS-to-FBS transition rules

The 2023 Old Dominion Monarchs football team represented Old Dominion University for the 2023 NCAA Division I FBS football season. The Monarchs played their home games at S.B. Ballard Stadium in Norfolk, Virginia. It was their second football season in the Sun Belt Conference, competing in the East Division. The team was coached by fourth-year head coach Ricky Rahne.

== Preseason ==
=== Media poll ===
In the Sun Belt preseason coaches' poll, the Monarchs were picked to finish in last place in the East division.

Jason Henderson was named the Preseason Defensive Player of the Year. Linebacker Jason Henderson was named to the preseason All-Sun Belt first team. Punter Ethan Duane was named to the second team.

== Schedule ==
The football schedule was announced February 24, 2023.

Date	Time	Opponent	Site	TV	Result	Attendance
September 2	8:00 p.m.	at Virginia Tech*	Lane Stadium; Blacksburg, VA	ACCN	L 17–36	65,632
September 9	6:00 p.m.	Louisiana	S.B. Ballard Stadium; Norfolk, VA	ESPN+	W 38–31	18,154
September 16	12:00 p.m.	Wake Forest*	S.B. Ballard Stadium; Norfolk, VA	ESPN2	L 24–27	18,276
September 23	3:30 p.m.	Texas A&M–Commerce*^{†}	S.B. Ballard Stadium; Norfolk, VA	ESPN+	W 10–9	16,938
September 30	3:30 p.m.	at Marshall	Joan C. Edwards Stadium; Huntington, WV	ESPN+	L 35–41	22,652
October 7	6:00 p.m.	at Southern Miss	M. M. Roberts Stadium; Hattiesburg, MS	ESPN+	W 17–13	23,011
October 21	7:00 p.m.	Appalachian State	S.B. Ballard Stadium; Norfolk, VA (Oyster Bowl)	NFLN	W 28–21	20,017
October 28	8:00 p.m.	at No. 25 James Madison	Bridgeforth Stadium; Harrisonburg, VA (Royal Rivalry)	ESPNU	L 27–30	26,239
November 4	3:30 p.m.	Coastal Carolina	S.B. Ballard Stadium; Norfolk, VA	ESPN+	L 24–28	17,982
November 11	1:00 p.m.	at Liberty*	Williams Stadium; Lynchburg, VA	ESPN+	L 10–38	21,481
November 18	6:00 p.m.	at Georgia Southern	Paulson Stadium; Statesboro, GA	ESPN+	W 20–17	20,032
November 25	2:00 p.m.	Georgia State	S.B. Ballard Stadium; Norfolk, VA	ESPN+	W 25–24	15,717
December 18	2:30 p.m.	vs. Western Kentucky*	Jerry Richardson Stadium; Charlotte, NC (Famous Toastery Bowl)	ESPN	L 35–38 ^{OT}	5,632
*Non-conference game; ^{†}Homecoming; Rankings from AP Poll and CFP Rankings released prior to game; All times are in Eastern time

== Game summaries ==
=== at Virginia Tech ===
Game One – Old Dominion Monarchs (0–0) at Virginia Tech Hokies (0–0)

Quarter	1	2	3	4	Total
Old Dominion	0	10	7	0	17
Virginia Tech	2	14	14	6	36

at Lane Stadium • Blacksburg, VA

- Date: September 2, 2023
- Game time: 8:00 p.m. EDT
- Game weather: clear • Temperature: 79 °F (26 °C)
- Game attendance: 65,632
- Referee: Gary Patterson
- TV: ACC Network

Game information

First Quarter

- (4:07) VT – Old Dominion snap through the back of the Endzone for a Safety (VT 2–0)

Second Quarter

- (14:53) VT – Jaylin Lane 20 yd Pass From Grant Wells (John Love Kick) (Drive: 10 plays, 55 yards, 4:07; VT 9–0)
- (9:33) ODU - Dominic Dutton 16 yd Pass From Grant Wilson (Ethan Sanchez Kick) (Drive: 12 plays, 83 yards, 5:14; VT 9-7)
- (2:03) VT - Ali Jennings 10 yd Pass From Grant Wells (John Love Kick) (Drive: 8 plays, 62 yards, 3:12; VT 16-7)
- (0:00) ODU - Ethan Sanchez 28 yd Field Goal (Drive: 12 plays, 64 yards, 2:03; VT 16-10)

Third Quarter

- (9:59) VT – Ali Jennings 6 yd Pass From Grant Wells (John Love Kick) (Drive: 6 plays, 69 yards, 2:19; VT 23–10)
- (5:43) ODU - Keshawn Wicks 5 yd Pass From Grant Wilson (Ethan Sanchez Kick) (Drive: 9 plays, 75 yards, 4:16; VT 23-17)
- (2:09) VT - Grant Wells 1 yd Rush (John Love Kick) (Drive: 8 plays, 65 yards, 3:34; VT 30-17)

Fourth Quarter

- (9:28) VT – John Love 27 yd Field Goal (Drive: 8 plays, 40 yards, 3:43; VT 33–17)
- (5:38) VT - John Love 21 yd Field Goal (Drive: 4 plays, 5 yards, 2:35; VT 36-17)

Statistics	ODU	VT
First downs	19	18
Total yards	295	368
Rush yards	201	109
Passing yards	94	259
Turnovers	3	0
Time of possession	26:20	33:40

Team	Category	Player	Statistics
Old Dominion	Passing	Grant Wilson	13/25, 94 yards, 2 TD
Old Dominion	Rushing	Grant Wilson	19 carries, 81 yards
Old Dominion	Receiving	Ahmarian Granger	3 receptions, 14 yards
Virginia Tech	Passing	Grant Wells	17/29, 251 yards, 3 TD
Virginia Tech	Rushing	Bhayshul Tuten	19 carries, 55 yards
Virginia Tech	Receiving	Ali Jennings	5 receptions, 72 yards, 2 TD

=== Louisiana ===
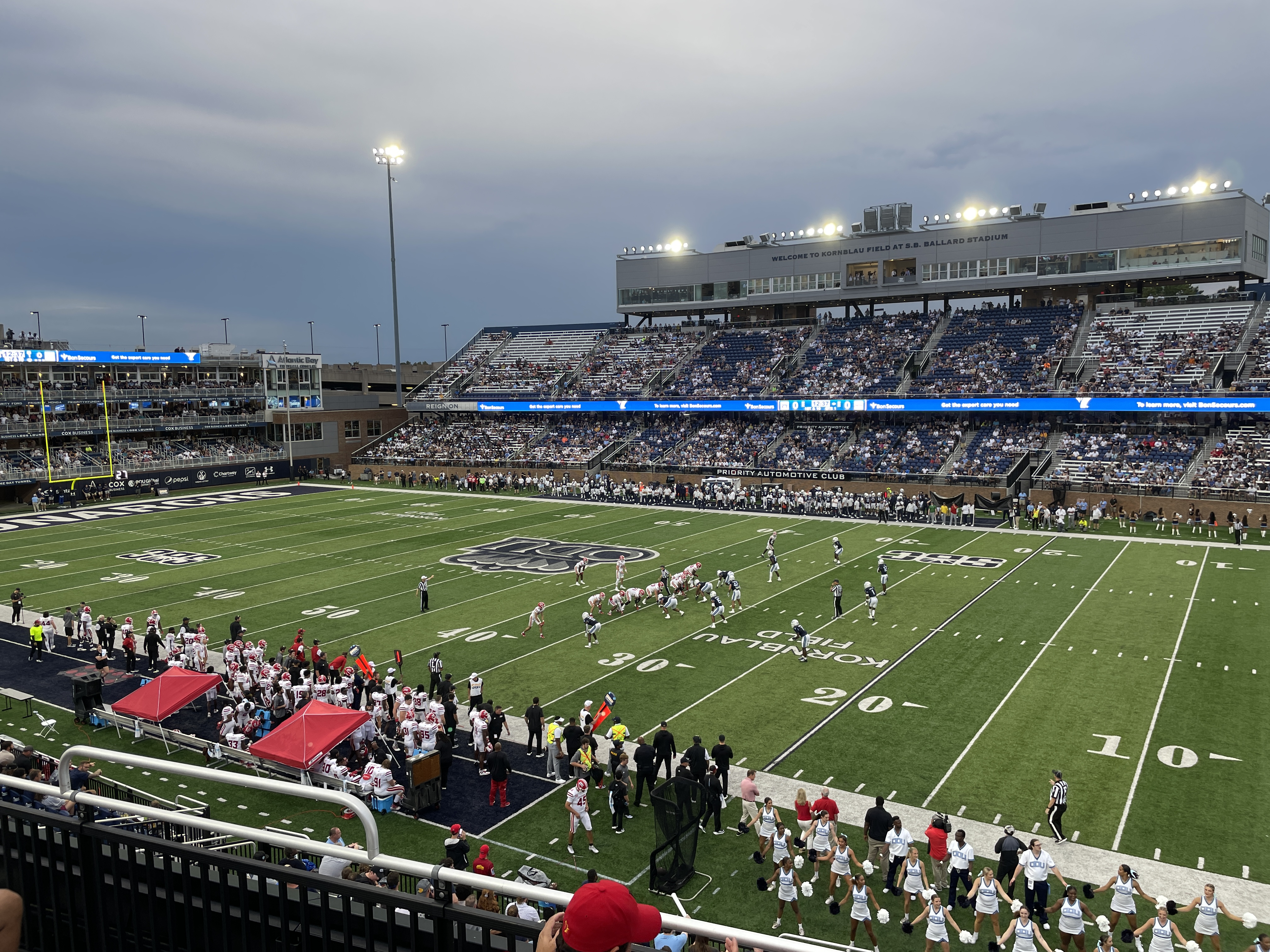
Old Dominion vs. the Louisiana Ragin' Cajuns

Game Two – Louisiana Ragin' Cajuns (1–0) at Old Dominion Monarchs (0–1)

Quarter	1	2	3	4	Total
Louisiana	10	7	0	14	31
Old Dominion	7	10	14	7	38

at S.B. Ballard Stadium • Norfolk, VA

- Date: September 9, 2023
- Game time: 6:00 p.m. EDT
- Game weather: Cloudy • Temperature: 85 °F (29 °C) • Wind: N 5 MPH
- Game attendance: 18,154
- Referee: Ted Pitts
- TV announcers (ESPN+): Chip Tarkenton (play-by-play) and Andy Mashaw (analyst)

Game information

First Quarter

- (10:59) LA – Harvey Broussard 3 yd Pass From Ben Wooldridge (Kenneth Almendares Kick) (Drive: 9 plays, 75 yards, 3:56; LA 7–0)
- (10:26) ODU – Ahmarian Grangers 30 yd Pass From Grant Wilson (Ethan Sanchez Kick) (Drive: 2 plays, 55 yards, 0:26; TIED 7–7)
- (3:32) LA – Kenneth Almendares 28 yd Field Goal (Drive: 12 plays, 54 yards, 6:46; LA 10–7)

Second Quarter

- (12:00) ODU – Ethan Sanchez 39 yd Field Goal (Drive: 10 plays, 58 yards, 4:00; TIED 10–10)
- (4:15) ODU – Grant Wilson 3 yd Rush (Ethan Sanchez Kick) (Drive: 10 plays, 65 yards, 3:55; ODU 17–10)
- (0:18) LA – Ben Wooldridge 1 yd Rush (Kenneth Almendares Kick) (Drive: 8 plays, 72 yards, 3:50; TIED 17–17)

Third Quarter

- (12:36) ODU – Reymello Murphy 36 yd Pass From Grant Wilson (Ethan Sanchez Kick) (Drive: 6 plays, 65 yards, 2:20; ODU 24–17)
- (4:43) ODU – Reymello Murphy 61 yd Pass From Grant Wilson (Ethan Sanchez Kick) (Drive: 3 plays, 68 yards, 1:20; ODU 31–17)

Fourth Quarter

- (14:57) LA – Terrance Williams 1 yd Rush (Kenneth Almendares Kick) (Drive: 10 plays, 55 yards, 4:37; ODU 31–24)
- (12:28) ODU – Kelby Williams 37 yd Pass From Grant Wilson (Ethan Sanchez Kick) (Drive: 7 plays, 83 yards, 2:24; ODU 38–24)
- (9:13) LA – Jacob Kibodi 37 yd Pass From Ben Wooldridge (Kenneth Almendares Kick) (Drive: 7 plays, 90 yards, 3:10; ODU 38–31)

Statistics	LA	ODU
First downs	24	20
Total yards	454	392
Rush yards	169	145
Passing yards	285	247
Turnovers	0	0
Time of possession	37:31	22:29

Team	Category	Player	Statistics
Louisiana	Passing	Ben Wooldridge	25/36, 285 yards, 2 TD
Louisiana	Rushing	Jacob Kibodi	10 carries, 54 yards
Louisiana	Receiving	Jacob Bernard	3 receptions, 70 yards
Old Dominion	Passing	Grant Wilson	13/19, 247 yards, 4 TD
Old Dominion	Rushing	Keshawn Wicks	17 carries, 104 yards
Old Dominion	Receiving	Reymello Murphy	2 receptions, 97 yards, 2 TD

=== at Marshall ===
Game Four – Old Dominion Monarchs (2–2) at Marshall Thundering Herd (3–0)

Quarter	1	2	3	4	Total
Old Dominion	7	14	7	7	35
Marshall	3	14	21	3	41

at Joan C. Edwards Stadium • Huntington, West Virginia

- Date: Saturday, September 30, 2023
- Game time: 3:30 p.m. EDT
- Game weather: Sunny
- Game attendance: 22,652
- Referee: Wayne Winkler
- TV announcers (ESPN+): Mark Martin (play-by-play), Carl Lee (analyst)

Game information

First quarter

- (14:03) ODU – Jack Shields 66 yard run, Ethan Sanchez kick (Drive: 3 plays, 70 yards, 0:49; ODU 7–0)
- (5:26) MAR – Rece Verhoff 42 yard field goal (Drive: 6 plays, 23 yards, 1:40; ODU 7–3)

Second quarter

- (13:23) ODU – Jordan Bly 19 yard pass from Jack Shields, Ethan Sanchez kick (Drive: 1 play, 19 yards, 0:06; ODU 14–3)
- (11:17) ODU – Kadarius Calloway 70 yard run, Ethan Sanchez kick (Drive: 1 play, 70 yards, 0:11; ODU 21–3)
- (9:11) MAR – Cade Conley 1 yard pass from Cam Fancher, Rece Verhoff kick (Drive: 4 plays, 57 yards, 2:00; ODU 21–10)
- (3:31) MAR – Caleb Coombs 22 yard pass from Cam Fancher, Rece Verhoff kick (Drive: 7 plays, 60 yards, 3:03; ODU 21–17)

Third quarter

- (10:10) MAR – Rasheen Ali 1 yard run, Rece Verhoff kick (Drive: 9 plays, 94 yards, 4:42; MAR 24–21)
- (8:13) MAR – Elijah Alston 85 yard interception return, Rece Verhoff kick (MAR 31–21)
- (7:50) ODU – Kadarius Calloway 69 yard run, Ethan Sanchez kick (Drive: 2 plays, 73 yards, 0:23; MAR 31–28)
- (2:59) MAR – Rasheen Ali 1 yard run, Rece Verhoff kick (Drive: 10 plays, 68 yards, 4:44; MAR 38–28)

Fourth quarter

- (8:21) MAR – Rece Verhoff 30 yard field goal (Drive: 9 plays, 54 yards, 4:59; MAR 41–28)
- (8:09) ODU – Kadarius Calloway 75 yard run, Ethan Sanchez kick (Drive: 1 play, 75 yards, 0:12; MAR 41–35)

Statistics	ODU	MAR
First downs	11	30
Plays–yards	54–434	84–464
Rushes–yards	31–339	49–186
Passing yards	95	278
Passing: comp–att–int	11–23–3	29–35–1
Turnovers		
Time of possession	18:39	41:21

Team	Category	Player	Statistics
Old Dominion	Passing	Jack Shields	11/23, 95 yards, 1 TD, 3 INT
Old Dominion	Rushing	Kadarius Calloway	11 carries, 236 yards, 3 TD
Old Dominion	Receiving	Reymello Murphy	1 reception, 42 yards
Marshall	Passing	Cam Fancher	29/35, 278 yards, 2 TD, 1 INT
Marshall	Rushing	Cam Fancher	15 carries, 102 yards
Marshall	Receiving	Caleb Coombs	8 receptions, 76 yards, 1 TD

=== at Southern Miss ===
Game Six – Old Dominion Monarchs (2–3) at Southern Miss Golden Eagles (1–4) – Game summary

Quarter	1	2	3	4	Total
Monarchs	0	0	0	0	0
Golden Eagles	0	0	0	0	0

at M.M. Roberts Stadium, Hattiesburg, MS

- Date: Saturday, October 7, 2023
- Game time: 6:00 p.m. CDT
- Game weather: -
- Game attendance: 23,011
- Referee: -
- TV announcers (ESPN+): TBD

Game information

First quarter

Second quarter

Third quarter

Fourth quarter

Statistics	ODU	USM
First downs		
Total yards		
Rushing yards		
Passing yards		
Passing: Comp–Att–Int		
Time of possession		

Team	Category	Player	Statistics
Old Dominion	Passing		
Old Dominion	Rushing		
Old Dominion	Receiving		
Southern Miss	Passing		
Southern Miss	Rushing		
Southern Miss	Receiving		
