= 2022 Old Dominion Monarchs football team =

American college football season

2022 Old Dominion Monarchs football
- Conference: Sun Belt Conference
- East Division
- Record: 3–9 (2–6 Sun Belt)
- Head coach: Ricky Rahne (3rd season)
- Offensive coordinator: Kevin Reihner (1st season)
- Offensive scheme: Spread
- Defensive coordinator: Blake Seiler (3rd season)
- Base defense: 3–2–6
- Home stadium: S.B. Ballard Stadium

2022 Sun Belt Conference football standings
	Conf.			Overall
Team	W		L	W		L
East Division
James Madison* x	6	–	2	8	–	3
Coastal Carolina xy	6	–	2	9	–	4
Marshall	5	–	3	9	–	4
Georgia Southern	3	–	5	6	–	7
Appalachian State	3	–	5	6	–	6
Georgia State	3	–	5	4	–	8
Old Dominion	2	–	6	3	–	9
West Division
No. 19 Troy xy$	7	–	1	12	–	2
South Alabama x	7	–	1	10	–	3
Southern Miss	4	–	4	7	–	6
Louisiana	4	–	4	6	–	7
Louisiana–Monroe	3	–	5	4	–	8
Texas State	2	–	6	4	–	8
Arkansas State	1	–	7	3	–	9
Championship: Troy 45, Coastal Carolina 26
$ – Conference champion; x – Division champion/co-champions; y – Championship game participant; * – Ineligible for postseason play due to FCS-to-FBS transition rules; Rankings from AP Poll

The 2022 Old Dominion Monarchs football team represented Old Dominion University during the 2022 NCAA Division I FBS football season. The Monarchs played their home games at S.B. Ballard Stadium in Norfolk, Virginia. It was their first football season in the Sun Belt Conference, competing in the East Division. Previously a member of the Sun Belt until 1991, the University did not field a football team at that time, nor did the conference sponsor the sport. The team was coached by third-year head coach Ricky Rahne.

== Preseason ==
=== Media poll ===
The Sun Belt media days were held on July 25 and July 26. The Monarchs were predicted to finish in last place in the Sun Belt's East Division.

=== Sun Belt Preseason All-Conference teams ===
Offense

1st team

- Zack Kuntz – Tight end, RS-JR
- Ali Jennings III – Wide receiver, JR

2nd team

- Nick Saldiveri – Offensive tackle, RS-JR

== Schedule ==
All conference games were announced March 1, 2022.

Date	Time	Opponent	Site	TV	Result	Attendance
September 2	7:00 p.m.	Virginia Tech*	S.B. Ballard Stadium; Norfolk, VA	ESPNU	W 20–17	21,944
September 10	6:00 p.m.	at East Carolina*	Dowdy–Ficklen Stadium; Greenville, NC	ESPN+	L 21–39	36,853
September 17	2:00 p.m.	at Virginia*	Scott Stadium; Charlottesville, VA	ACCN	L 14–16	40,556
September 24	6:00 p.m.	Arkansas State	S.B. Ballard Stadium; Norfolk, VA	ESPN+	W 29–26	20,655
October 1	6:00 p.m.	Liberty*	S.B. Ballard Stadium; Norfolk, VA	ESPN+	L 24–38	18,368
October 15	12:00 p.m.	at Coastal Carolina	Brooks Stadium; Conway, SC	ESPNU	W 49–21	16,814
October 22	3:30 p.m.	Georgia Southern^{†}	S.B. Ballard Stadium; Norfolk, VA	ESPN+	L 23–28	20,162
October 29	3:00 p.m.	at Georgia State	Center Parc Stadium; Atlanta, GA	ESPN+	L 17–31	16,203
November 5	2:00 p.m.	Marshall	S.B. Ballard Stadium; Norfolk, VA	ESPN+	L 0–12	18,327
November 12	1:00 p.m.	James Madison	S.B. Ballard Stadium; Norfolk, VA (Oyster Bowl, Royal Rivalry)	ESPN+	L 3–37	21,934
November 19	2:30 p.m.	at Appalachian State	Kidd Brewer Stadium; Boone, NC	ESPN+	L 14–27	32,096
November 26	12:00 p.m.	at South Alabama	Hancock Whitney Stadium; Mobile, AL	ESPN+	L 20–27	11,407
*Non-conference game; ^{†}Homecoming; Rankings from AP Poll and CFP Rankings released prior to game; All times are in Eastern time

== Staff ==
Name	Position	Consecutive season at Old Dominion
Ricky Rahne	Head coach	2nd (3rd overall)
Kevin Reihner	Offensive coordinator/Offensive line	3rd
Blake Seiler	Defensive coordinator/inside Linebackers coach	3rd
Kevin Smith	Special Teams Coordinator/outside Linebackers coach	3rd
Mark Dupuis	Wide receivers coach	3rd
Justin Harper	Tight ends coach	1st
Victor Irokansi	Defensive line coach	2nd
Tony Lucas	Offensive recruiting coordinator/running backs coach	3rd
Remington Rebstock	Assistant defensive coordinator/safeties coach	3rd
Leon Wright	Defensive recruiting coordinator/cornerbacks coach	3rd
Chad Snodgrass	Director of Sports Performance	1st

== Game summaries ==
=== Virginia Tech ===
Virginia Tech at Old Dominion

Team	1	2	3	4	Total
Hokies	7	0	10	0	17
• Monarchs	0	10	0	10	20

- Date: September 2, 2022
- Location: S.B. Ballard Stadium
  Norfolk, VA
- Game start: 7:04 p.m. EDT
- Elapsed time: 4 hours and 7 minutes
- Game attendance: 21,944
- Game weather: 81 °F (27 °C) • Weather: Sunny • Wind: SW 10 MPH
- Referee: Wayne Wrinkler
- TV announcers (ESPNU): Kevin Brown (play–by–play), Hutson Mason (analyst)

Scoring summary
1	09:12	VT	Grant Wells 18-yard rush (William Ross kick) (4 plays, 66 yards, 1:31)	VT 7–0
2	12:02	ODU	Ethan Sanchez 29-yard field goal (8 plays, 25 yards, 3:46)	VT 7–3
2	01:26	ODU	Robert Kennedy III 25-yard fumble return (Ethan Sanchez kick) (7 plays, -7 yards, 3:21)	ODU 10–7
3	09:03	VT	William Ross 44-yard field goal (8 plays, 46 yards, 4:28)	TIE 10–10
3	05:11	VT	Keshawn King 6-yard pass from Grant Wells (William Ross kick) (3 plays, 10 yards, 0:46)	VT 17–10
4	12:30	ODU	Ethan Sanchez 20-yard field goal (12 plays, 49 yards, 3:57)	VT 17–13
4	00:33	ODU	Blake Watson 1-yard rush (Ethan Sanchez kick) (9 plays, 74 yards, 2:25)	ODU 20–17

Statistics	VT	ODU
First downs	18	13
Total yards	333	248
Rushing yards	136	83
Passing yards	197	165
Turnovers	5	2
Time of possession	33:23	26:37

Team	Category	Player	Statistics
Virginia Tech	Passing	Grant Wells	21/36, 197 yards, TD, 4 INT
Virginia Tech	Rushing	Keshawn King	19 rushes, 111 yards
Virginia Tech	Receiving	Nick Gallo	7 receptions, 49 yards
Old Dominion	Passing	Hayden Wolff	14/35, 165 yards
Old Dominion	Rushing	Blake Watson	19 rushes, 60 yards, TD
Old Dominion	Receiving	Ali Jennings III	5 receptions, 122 yards

=== At East Carolina ===
	1	2	3	4	Total
Monarchs	7	0	7	7	21
Pirates	9	7	6	17	39

Statistics

Statistics	ODU	ECU
First downs	12	30
Total yards	290	531
Rushing yards	15	261
Passing yards	275	270
Turnovers	2	0
Time of possession	19:08	40:52

Team	Category	Player	Statistics
Old Dominion	Passing	Hayden Wolff	18/29, 275 yards, 3 TD, INT
Old Dominion	Rushing	Blake Watson	5 rushes, 45 yards
Old Dominion	Receiving	Ali Jennings III	8 receptions, 200 yards, 3 TD
East Carolina	Passing	Holton Ahlers	25/39, 270 yards, 2 TD
East Carolina	Rushing	Keaton Mitchell	18 rushes, 160 yards, 2 TD
East Carolina	Receiving	Jaylen Johnson	9 receptions, 93 yards

=== At Virginia ===
	1	2	3	4	Total
Monarchs	0	7	0	7	14
Cavaliers	7	3	0	6	16

Statistics

Statistics	ODU	UVA
First downs	20	26
Total yards	324	513
Rushing yards	89	229
Passing yards	235	284
Turnovers	1	3
Time of possession	26:28	33:32

Team	Category	Player	Statistics
Old Dominion	Passing	Hayden Wolff	23/37, 235 yards, 2 TD
Old Dominion	Rushing	Blake Watson	21 rushes, 70 yards
Old Dominion	Receiving	Ali Jennings III	7 receptions, 97 yards, TD
Virginia	Passing	Brennan Armstrong	20/37, 284 yards
Virginia	Rushing	Xavier Brown	9 rushes, 88 yards
Virginia	Receiving	Keytaon Johnson	9 receptions, 118 yards

=== Arkansas State ===
	1	2	3	4	Total
Red Wolves	0	12	7	7	26
Monarchs	0	0	21	8	29

Statistics

Statistics	ASU	ODU
First downs	22	12
Total yards	397	330
Rushing yards	112	51
Passing yards	285	279
Turnovers	2	0
Time of possession	38:16	21:44

Team	Category	Player	Statistics
Arkansas State	Passing	James Blackman	23/35, 285 yards, TD, INT
Arkansas State	Rushing	AJ Mayer	7 rushes, 46 yards, TD
Arkansas State	Receiving	Jeff Foreman	4 receptions, 115 yards, TD
Old Dominion	Passing	Hayden Wolff	19/32, 279 yards, 2 TD
Old Dominion	Rushing	Keshawn Wicks	9 rushes, 36 yards, TD
Old Dominion	Receiving	Ali Jennings III	4 receptions, 140 yards, TD

=== Liberty ===
	1	2	3	4	Total
Flames	14	7	10	7	38
Monarchs	14	3	7	0	24

Statistics

Statistics	LU	ODU
First downs	23	20
Total yards	478	415
Rushing yards	210	118
Passing yards	268	297
Turnovers	2	1
Time of possession	28:57	31:03

Team	Category	Player	Statistics
Liberty	Passing	Kaidon Salter	10/19, 170 yards, 2 TD, 2 INT
Liberty	Rushing	Dae Dae Hunter	15 rushes, 121 yards, 2 TD
Liberty	Receiving	CJ Yarbrough	4 receptions, 94 yards, TD
Old Dominion	Passing	Hayden Wolff	27/46, 297 yards, 2 TD, INT
Old Dominion	Rushing	Blake Watson	15 rushes, 80 yards
Old Dominion	Receiving	Ali Jennings III	8 receptions, 129 yards, TD

=== At Coastal Carolina ===
	1	2	3	4	Total
Monarchs	7	7	21	14	49
Chanticleers	0	7	7	7	21

Statistics

Statistics	ODU	CCU
First downs	23	23
Total yards	525	454
Rushing yards	324	88
Passing yards	201	366
Turnovers	0	1
Time of possession	23:02	36:58

Team	Category	Player	Statistics
Old Dominion	Passing	Hayden Wolff	12/16, 184 yards, 2 TD
Old Dominion	Rushing	Blake Watson	19 rushes, 259 yards, 3 TD
Old Dominion	Receiving	Ali Jennings III	6 receptions, 87 yards, TD
Coastal Carolina	Passing	Grayson McCall	26/34, 358 yards, 3 TD
Coastal Carolina	Rushing	Reese White	10 rushes, 46 yards
Coastal Carolina	Receiving	Sam Pinckney	7 receptions, 113 yards

=== Georgia Southern ===
	1	2	3	4	Total
Eagles	7	7	7	7	28
Monarchs	3	0	13	7	23

Statistics

Statistics	GS	ODU
First downs	25	18
Total yards	415	446
Rushing yards	223	133
Passing yards	192	313
Turnovers	0	0
Time of possession	34:33	25:27

Team	Category	Player	Statistics
Georgia Southern	Passing	Kyle Vantrease	22/27, 192 yards, TD
Georgia Southern	Rushing	Jalen White	30 rushes, 138 yards, TD
Georgia Southern	Receiving	Amare Jones	5 receptions, 54 yards, TD
Old Dominion	Passing	Hayden Wolff	23/40, 313 yards, TD
Old Dominion	Rushing	Blake Watson	16 rushes, 108 yards, TD
Old Dominion	Receiving	Ali Jennings III	9 receptions, 130 yards, TD

=== At Georgia State ===
	1	2	3	4	Total
Monarchs	7	7	0	3	17
Panthers	7	7	14	3	31

Statistics

Statistics	ODU	GSU
First downs	11	24
Total yards	283	413
Rushing yards	26	218
Passing yards	257	195
Turnovers	2	1
Time of possession	22:50	37:10

Team	Category	Player	Statistics
Old Dominion	Passing	Hayden Wolff	19/34, 257 yards, 2 TD, INT
Old Dominion	Rushing	Blake Watson	14 rushes, 53 yards
Old Dominion	Receiving	Javon Harvey	3 receptions, 124 yards, TD
Georgia State	Passing	Darren Grainger	14/20, 195 yards, TD
Georgia State	Rushing	Darren Grainger	19 rushes, 104 yards, TD
Georgia State	Receiving	Jamari Thrash	3 receptions, 87 yards, TD

=== Marshall ===
	1	2	3	4	Total
T. Herd	0	6	3	3	12
Monarchs	0	0	0	0	0

Statistics

Statistics	MU	ODU
First downs	20	13
Total yards	387	209
Rushing yards	298	11
Passing yards	89	198
Turnovers	2	4
Time of possession	38:11	21:49

Team	Category	Player	Statistics
Marshall	Passing	Cam Fancher	13/25, 189 yards, 2 INT
Marshall	Rushing	Khalan Laborn	31 rushes, 139 yards
Marshall	Receiving	EJ Horton	4 receptions, 28 yards
Old Dominion	Passing	Hayden Wolff	24/46, 198 yards, INT
Old Dominion	Rushing	Blake Watson	10 rushes, 28 yards
Old Dominion	Receiving	Javon Harvey	4 receptions, 60 yards

=== James Madison ===
	1	2	3	4	Total
Dukes	7	10	13	7	37
Monarchs	0	3	0	0	3

Statistics

Statistics	JMU	ODU
First downs	22	11
Total yards	491	227
Rushing yards	187	78
Passing yards	304	149
Turnovers	2	4
Time of possession	38:12	21:48

Team	Category	Player	Statistics
James Madison	Passing	Todd Centeio	18/21, 304 yards, 1 INT
James Madison	Rushing	Percy Agyei-Obese	16 carries, 82 yards, 1 TD
James Madison	Receiving	Kris Thornton	6 receptions, 140 yards
Old Dominion	Passing	Hayden Wolff	12/22, 112 yards, 2 INT
Old Dominion	Rushing	Hayden Wolff	9 carries, 27 yards
Old Dominion	Receiving	Ahmarian Granger	4 receptions, 46 yards

=== At Appalachian State ===
	1	2	3	4	Total
Monarchs	0	0	0	14	14
Mountaineers	10	14	3	0	27

Statistics

Statistics	ODU	APP
First downs	20	25
Total yards	394	498
Rushing yards	86	207
Passing yards	308	291
Turnovers	1	0
Time of possession	27:18	32:42

Team	Category	Player	Statistics
Old Dominion	Passing	Hayden Wolff	22/38, 308 yards, 2 TD
Old Dominion	Rushing	Blake Watson	10 carries, 69 yards
Old Dominion	Receiving	Javon Harvey	4 receptions, 133 yards, 2 TD
Appalachian State	Passing	Chase Brice	15/22, 291 yards, 2 TD
Appalachian State	Rushing	Ahmani Marshall	19 carries, 137 yards, 1 TD
Appalachian State	Receiving	Kaedin Robinson	3 receptions, 90 yards, 1 TD

=== At South Alabama ===
	1	2	3	4	Total
Monarchs	10	10	0	0	20
Jaguars	7	6	7	7	27

Statistics

Statistics	ODU	USA
First downs	17	24
Total yards	381	398
Rushing yards	96	208
Passing yards	285	190
Turnovers	0	1
Time of possession	24:52	35:08

Team	Category	Player	Statistics
Old Dominion	Passing	Hayden Wolff	21/36, 285 yards, 2 TD
Old Dominion	Rushing	Blake Watson	18 carries, 110 yards
Old Dominion	Receiving	Blake Watson	6 receptions, 88 yards, 1 TD
South Alabama	Passing	Carter Bradley	17/29, 190 yards, 3 TD, 1 INT
South Alabama	Rushing	La'Damian Webb	18 carries, 74 yards
South Alabama	Receiving	Jalen Wayne	3 receptions, 63 yards, 1 TD

== Players drafted into the NFL ==
Round	Pick	Player	Position	NFL Club
4	103	Nick Saldiveri	T	New Orleans Saints
6	209	Tre Hawkins	CB	New York Giants
7	220	Zack Kuntz	TE	New York Jets
