= Travis Fulgham =

American football player (born 1995)

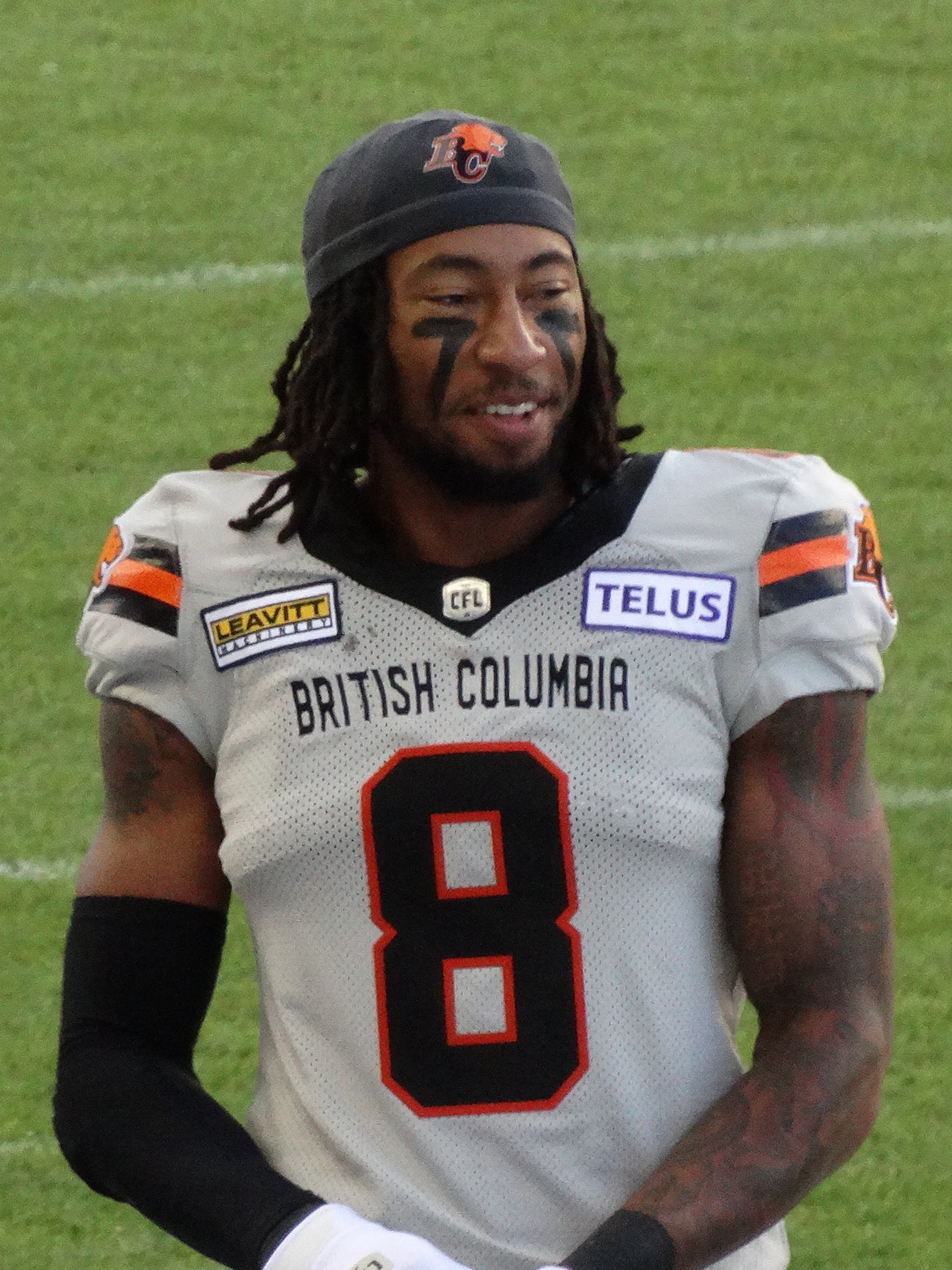
- Fulgham with the BC Lions in 2024

No. 13, 14, 17
- Position: Wide receiver

Personal information
- Born: September 13, 1995 (age 31); Alexandria, Virginia, U.S.
- Listed height: 6 ft 2 in (1.88 m)
- Listed weight: 215 lb (98 kg)

Career information
- High school: Broad Run (Ashburn, Virginia)
- College: Old Dominion (2014–2018)
- NFL draft: 2019: 6th round, 184th overall pick

Career history
- Detroit Lions (2019); Green Bay Packers (2020)*; Philadelphia Eagles (2020–2021); Miami Dolphins (2021)*; Denver Broncos (2021); Green Bay Packers (2022)*; BC Lions (2024)
- * Offseason or practice squad member only

Awards and highlights
- Second-team All-Conference USA (2018)

Career NFL statistics
- Receptions: 38
- Receiving yards: 539
- Receiving touchdowns: 4
- Stats at Pro Football Reference

Travis Fulgham (born September 13, 1995) is an American former professional football player who was a wide receiver in the National Football League (NFL) and Canadian Football League (CFL). He played college football for the Old Dominion Monarchs and was selected in the sixth round of the 2019 NFL draft by the Detroit Lions.

== Early life ==
The child of Foreign Service officers, Fulgham spent most of his childhood abroad before his parents settled in Ashburn, Virginia and attended Massanutten Military Academy before transferring to Broad Run High School. Fulgham only played two years of high school football.

== College career ==
Fulgham played five seasons for the Monarchs at Old Dominion University, redshirting his freshman season. Although he initially joined the team as a walk-on, he earned a scholarship by the end of fall camp during his first year. As a senior, Fulgham led Conference USA with 1,083 receiving yards and a 17.2 yards per catch and was named second team All-Conference USA. He finished his collegiate career seventh in school history with 128 receptions for 2,044 yards and 18 receiving touchdowns (sixth in school history). Following the end of his redshirt senior season, Fulgham was invited to play in the 2019 Senior Bowl, becoming one of the first Old Dominion players to participate along with linebacker Oshane Ximines. He caught one pass for seven yards in the game.

== Professional career ==
Pre-draft measurables
Height	Weight	Arm length	Hand span	40-yard dash	10-yard split	20-yard split	20-yard shuttle	Three-cone drill	Vertical jump	Broad jump	Bench press
6 ft 2 1/2 in (1.89 m)	215 lb (98 kg)	33 3/4 in (0.86 m)	9 1/2 in (0.24 m)	4.55 s	1.66 s	2.66 s	4.22 s	6.84 s	36.5 in (0.93 m)	10 ft 6 in (3.20 m)	15 reps
All values from NFL Combine/Pro Day

=== Detroit Lions ===
Fulgham was selected by the Detroit Lions in the sixth round with the 184th overall pick in the 2019 NFL draft. Fulgham signed a rookie contract with the Lions on May 14, 2019. He was waived on September 26, 2019, and re-signed to the practice squad. The Lions promoted Fulgham back up to the active roster on December 12, 2019. He made his NFL debut on December 15, 2019, against the Tampa Bay Buccaneers.

On August 9, 2020, Fulgham was waived by the Lions.

=== Green Bay Packers (first stint) ===
On August 10, 2020, Fulgham was claimed off waivers by the Green Bay Packers. He was waived on August 19, 2020.

=== Philadelphia Eagles ===
Fulgham was claimed off waivers by the Philadelphia Eagles on August 25, 2020. He was waived on September 3, 2020, but was re-signed to the practice squad three days later. He was promoted to the active roster on October 3, 2020. The next day in a Sunday Night Football game against the San Francisco 49ers, Fulgham caught his first NFL pass and caught a 42-yard pass from Carson Wentz for his first career touchdown. The following week, Fulgham caught ten passes for 152 yards and a touchdown in a 38–29 loss to the Pittsburgh Steelers. He became the 11th player in Eagles history with at least ten catches and 150 or more yards in a game, and his 152 yards are the 2nd most for an Eagle in one of their first five games. The next week in a showdown with the Baltimore Ravens, Fulgham posted 6 receptions for 75 yards and a touchdown that put the Eagles in position to tie the game late in the fourth quarter with a successful two-point conversion. In Week 8 against the Dallas Cowboys, Fulgham had 6 receptions for 78 yards and a touchdown in the 23–9 win. Fulgham finished the season with 38 receptions for a team-high 539 receiving yards and four touchdown receptions.

On August 31, 2021, Fulgham was waived by the Eagles and re-signed to the practice squad the next day. On October 11, 2021, he was released from the Eagles' practice squad.

=== Miami Dolphins ===
On October 12, 2021, Fulgham was signed to the Miami Dolphins practice squad. He was released on December 13.

=== Denver Broncos ===
On December 15, 2021, Fulgham signed with the Denver Broncos practice squad. He was elevated for the teams Week 17 game against the Los Angeles Chargers. Fulgham signed a reserve/future contract with the Broncos on January 10, 2022. He was released on August 16, 2022.

=== Green Bay Packers (second stint) ===
On August 18, 2022, Fulgham was claimed off waivers by the Green Bay Packers. He was waived on August 30, 2022, and signed to the practice squad the next day. On September 20, 2022, Fulgham was released from the practice squad. He was signed to the practice squad two days later. His practice squad contract with the team expired after the season on January 8, 2023.

=== BC Lions ===
On January 16, 2024, Fulgham signed with the BC Lions of the Canadian Football League. He played and started in three games where he had six catches for 98 yards and one touchdown. He was released in week 4 on June 24, 2024.

== Career statistics ==
=== NFL ===
Year	Team	GP	GS	Receiving							Fumbles	
Year	Team	GP	GS	Rec	Tgt	Yds	Avg	Lng	TD	FD	Fum	Lost
2019	DET	3	0	0	3	0	0.0	0	0	0	0	0
2020	PHI	13	8	38	67	539	14.2	42	4	26	0	0
2021	DEN	1	0	0	0	0	0.0	0	0	0	0	0
Total		17	8	38	70	539	14.2	42	4	26	0	0

=== College ===
Year	Team	GP	Rec	Yards	AVG	TDs
2015	ODU	4	6	89	14.8	0
2016	ODU	12	29	478	16.5	8
2017	ODU	11	30	394	13.1	1
2018	ODU	12	63	1,083	17.2	9
Totals		39	128	2,044	16.0	18
