= Tre Hawkins =

American football player (born 2000)

Louisville Kings
- Position: Cornerback
- Roster status: Unsigned draft pick

Personal information
- Born: August 1, 2000 (age 26); Temple, Texas, U.S.
- Listed height: 6 ft 3 in (1.91 m)
- Listed weight: 195 lb (88 kg)

Career information
- High school: Temple (TX)
- College: Trinity Valley (2018–2019); Old Dominion (2020–2022)
- NFL draft: 2023: 6th round, 209th overall pick

Career history
- New York Giants (2023–2024); Washington Commanders (2025); Minnesota Vikings (2026)*; Louisville Kings (2027-present)
- * Offseason or practice squad member only

Career NFL statistics as of 2025
- Tackles: 45
- Pass deflections: 3
- Interceptions: 1
- Stats at Pro Football Reference

Larry "Tre" Hawkins III (born August 1, 2000), is an American professional football cornerback. He played college football for the Trinity Valley Cardinals and Old Dominion Monarchs. Hawkins was selected by the New York Giants in the sixth round of the 2023 NFL draft. Hawkins has also played for the Washington Commanders.

== College career ==
Hawkins played three seasons at Old Dominion and put up 134 tackles, six going for a loss, two interceptions, 12 pass deflections, three fumble recoveries, and three forced fumbles.

== Professional career ==
Pre-draft measurables
Height	Weight	Arm length	Hand span	Wingspan	40-yard dash	10-yard split	20-yard split	20-yard shuttle	Three-cone drill	Vertical jump	Broad jump	Bench press
6 ft 1 7/8 in (1.88 m)	188 lb (85 kg)	32 1/8 in (0.82 m)	9 in (0.23 m)	6 ft 5 3/4 in (1.97 m)	4.39 s	1.52 s	2.50 s	4.22 s	6.74 s	37.5 in (0.95 m)	10 ft 9 in (3.28 m)	17 reps
All values from Old Dominion's Pro Day

=== New York Giants ===
Hawkins was drafted by the New York Giants in the sixth round, 209th overall, of the 2023 NFL draft. He appeared in all 17 games for the Giants during his rookie campaign, logging 35 combined tackles.

In Week 14 against the New Orleans Saints, Hawkins recorded his first career interception against Derek Carr. The pick was New York's first since Week 1, breaking an 11-game stretch in which the Giants did not record an interception, an NFL record. In the same game, Hawkins suffered a fractured lumbar spine injury, ending his season. He finished his season with 10 tackles across three appearances.

On August 26, 2025, Hawkins was waived by the Giants with an injury designation as part of final roster cuts.

=== Washington Commanders ===
On November 5, 2025, the Washington Commanders signed Hawkins to their practice squad. On January 5, 2026, he signed a reserve/futures contract with the Commanders. He was waived by Washington on August 2.

=== Minnesota Vikings ===
On August 25, 2026, Hawkins signed with the Minnesota Vikings. On August 30, he was waived by the Vikings as a part of the final roster cuts.
