= Ronnie Cameron =

American football player (born 1989)

No. 93
- Position: Defensive end

Personal information
- Born: August 15, 1989 (age 37); Westbury, New York, U.S.
- Listed height: 6 ft 2 in (1.88 m)
- Listed weight: 305 lb (138 kg)

Career information
- High school: Holy Trinity Diocesan (Hicksville, New York)
- College: Old Dominion
- NFL draft: 2012: undrafted

Career history
- Chicago Bears (2012)*; Cleveland Browns (2012); Philadelphia Eagles (2012−2013)*
- * Offseason or practice squad member only

Awards and highlights
- 2011 CAA Defensive Player of the Year; 2011 FCS All-American
- Stats at Pro Football Reference

Ronnie Cameron (born August 15, 1989) is an American former football defensive end. He was signed by the Chicago Bears as an undrafted free agent in 2012. He played college football for Hofstra University and Old Dominion University.

== College career ==
Cameron played college football at Hofstra until they dropped football following the 2009 season. Ronnie then transferred to Old Dominion for his junior and senior seasons. After his senior season, he was named The Roanoke Times Defensive Player of the Year, won the College Football Performance Awards's Elite Defensive Tackle Award and selected as a 1st team FCS All-American by The Sports Network and the American Football Coaches Association.

== Professional career ==
=== Chicago Bears ===
On April 29, 2012, Cameron signed with Chicago Bears as an undrafted free agent. He was waived by the team on August 11, 2012.

=== Cleveland Browns ===
On August 13, 2012, Cameron was claimed by the Cleveland Browns off waivers. On August 31, he was released from the Browns, only to be signed to their practice squad the next day. On November 2, he was promoted to the active roster, but was later waived on December 10.

=== Philadelphia Eagles ===
On December 12, 2012, Cameron signed with the Philadelphia Eagles to join their practice squad.
