= Ethan Sanchez =

American football player

Profile
- Position: Placekicker

Personal information
- Listed height: 5 ft 9 in (1.75 m)
- Listed weight: 189 lb (86 kg)

Career information
- High school: North Paulding (Dallas, Georgia)
- College: Old Dominion (2022–2024); Houston (2025)

Ethan Sanchez is an American football placekicker. He played college football for the Old Dominion Monarchs and the Houston Cougars.

== Early life ==
Sanchez was born to José and Aly Sánchez, who each emigrated separately from Mexico to the United States and met by chance while visiting their hometown, San Miguel de Allende. Soon afterwards, a smitten José sold his belongings and bought a bus ticket from his home in Texas to Georgia, where she lived. They married two years later, in 1992, and ran small businesses. Ethan was the youngest of three boys; his father nearly named him "Diego Maradona" in the hospital before his mother dismissed the idea when she regaining consciousness from the anesthesia.

Sanchez grew up in Dallas, Georgia. Inspired by his father and older brothers, he started playing soccer at age three, and was later featured on the cover of a national soccer publication. Sanchez attended North Paulding High School in Dallas, where he continued to play soccer for both the school and travel team. However, he grew tired of the constant driving to practices during the week followed by weekend tournaments, and gave up the sport entirely as a sophomore. Sanchez decided on football after his mother insisted he choose another sport, though she was initially resistant to his idea, fearing injury. As a senior, he converted 32-of-32 extra points and his longest field goal was from 47 yards. Sanchez was a first-team all-county and first-team all-region honoree. He was selected to play in the 2022 Polynesian Bowl in Hawai'i, converting a field goal for Team Makai in a 17–3 win over Team Mauka.

=== Recruiting ===
Sanchez was rated as a six-star recruit and the second-best kicker in the country in the class of 2022, according to Chris Sailer Kicking. However, by the summer after his junior year, he had still not received any college offers. Sanchez was invited to a camp at Old Dominion University (ODU) by special teams coordinator Kevin Smith, and was offered a scholarship after he went a perfect 10-for-10 on field goals and kicked five kickoffs into the back of the end zone. He was later offered a walk-on spot at the University of Georgia, which included enough aid to pay for his schooling. On October 4, 2021, Sanchez verbally committed to play college football at ODU. He signed with the Old Dominion Monarchs in December.

== College career ==
=== Old Dominion ===
Sanchez enrolled early at Old Dominion in December 2021. As a freshman in 2022, he converted 28-of-28 extra points and 10-of-13 field goals in 11 games played. In 2023, Sanchez played in all 13 games and converted 36-of-36 extra points and 14-of-21 field goals, including a then-career-long 49-yarder. He hit a game-winning walk-off 22-yard field goal against Georgia Southern. In 2024, Sanchez played in all 12 games, converting 37-of-42 extra points and 11-of-12 field goals, including a career-long 53-yard field goal in an upset win over Bowling Green, just one yard shy of the school record. After the season, he entered the NCAA transfer portal.

=== Houston ===
On December 21, 2024, Sanchez announced he would be transferring to the University of Houston to play for the Cougars, with one year of eligibility remaining. He won the starting kicker job in preseason camp, beating out Notre Dame transfer Zac Yoakum. On September 12, 2025, Sanchez converted a career-high five field goals, including a 52-yarder, in a 36–20 win over Colorado. It was the most made in a game by a Houston kicker since Richie Leone made five in 2013. Sanchez was named the Big 12 co-special teams player of the week for his performance. On September 26, he kicked a game-winning 24-yard field goal in overtime to cap off a 27–24 victory at Oregon State. Sanchez was named the Big 12 special teams player of the week again in mid-October after converting four-of-four field goals, including a 48-yarder, in a 39–17 win over Oklahoma State. He earned the award for a third time the following week after he made a game-winning 41-yard field goal as time expired to give the Cougars a 31–28 win over Arizona. On November 7, Sanchez converted three field goals, including a 22-yarder with under three minutes remaining to give Houston a 30–27 victory over UCF. In his final career game, the 2025 Texas Bowl, he kicked a 25-yard field goal in a 38–35 win over LSU.

Sanchez converted 43-of-43 extra points and 21-of-26 field goals in 13 games played, earning All-Big 12 honorable mention. He was named a first-team All-Texas selection by Dave Campbell's Texas Football, and was a semifinalist for the Lou Groza Award.

== Professional career ==
Sanchez participated in Houston's pro day on March 27, 2026, and only performed positional drills, after which he reportedly met privately with the Philadelphia Eagles. Aside from Philadelphia, he also received "extensive interest" from the San Francisco 49ers, Washington Commanders, and Atlanta Falcons, and attended the Falcons local pro day (Note: Atlanta hosted 59 Georgia-based players with ties to Metro Atlanta or a local university.) on April 10.

Pre-draft measurables
Height	Weight	Arm length	Hand span	Wingspan
5 ft 8 5/8 in (1.74 m)	189 lb (86 kg)	29 3/8 in (0.75 m)	8 5/8 in (0.22 m)	6 ft 0 1/2 in (1.84 m)
All values from Pro Day

After going unselected in the 2026 NFL draft, Sanchez accepted the San Francisco 49ers' invitation to attend their rookie minicamp.

== Personal life ==
Sanchez has cited his Mexican heritage and his parents' sacrifices as immigrants as a source of motivation. "My parents, they've always taken care of me," he said in a 2024 interview. "They are always sacrificing, always looking out for their children. And they've done well for themselves. They've lived the American dream. They came here from Mexico with very little and they've grown it into a lot. They’ve worked so hard." In 2025, he said: "I love representing the name on my back, 'Sanchez,' because I come from a family of hardworking people who made a lot of sacrifices."

His father, José, was diagnosed with multiple myeloma and nearly died in 2022. After months of chemotherapy, he received a life-saving bone marrow transplant in July 2023. After 100 days of isolation and five months without seeing his son, José was allowed to travel to Ethan's game against Georgia Southern on November 18, 2023, and watched him convert the game-winning 22-yard field goal.

Sanchez was a biomedical sciences major at Old Dominion. His older brothers, twins Johnathan and Nathaniel, both studied engineering at Kennesaw State University. "We’ve had some hard times," José said in 2024. "I never went to college. To see my kids go to college and graduate, I’ve told them that I’m so happy for you and I live through you."

Sanchez grew up idolizing Cristiano Ronaldo and is a fan of Manchester United. In 2025, he performed Ronaldo's trademark "siuuu" celebration after making a 49-yard field goal against Colorado on Hispanic Heritage Night at TDECU Stadium.
