= Taylor Heinicke =

American football player (born 1993)

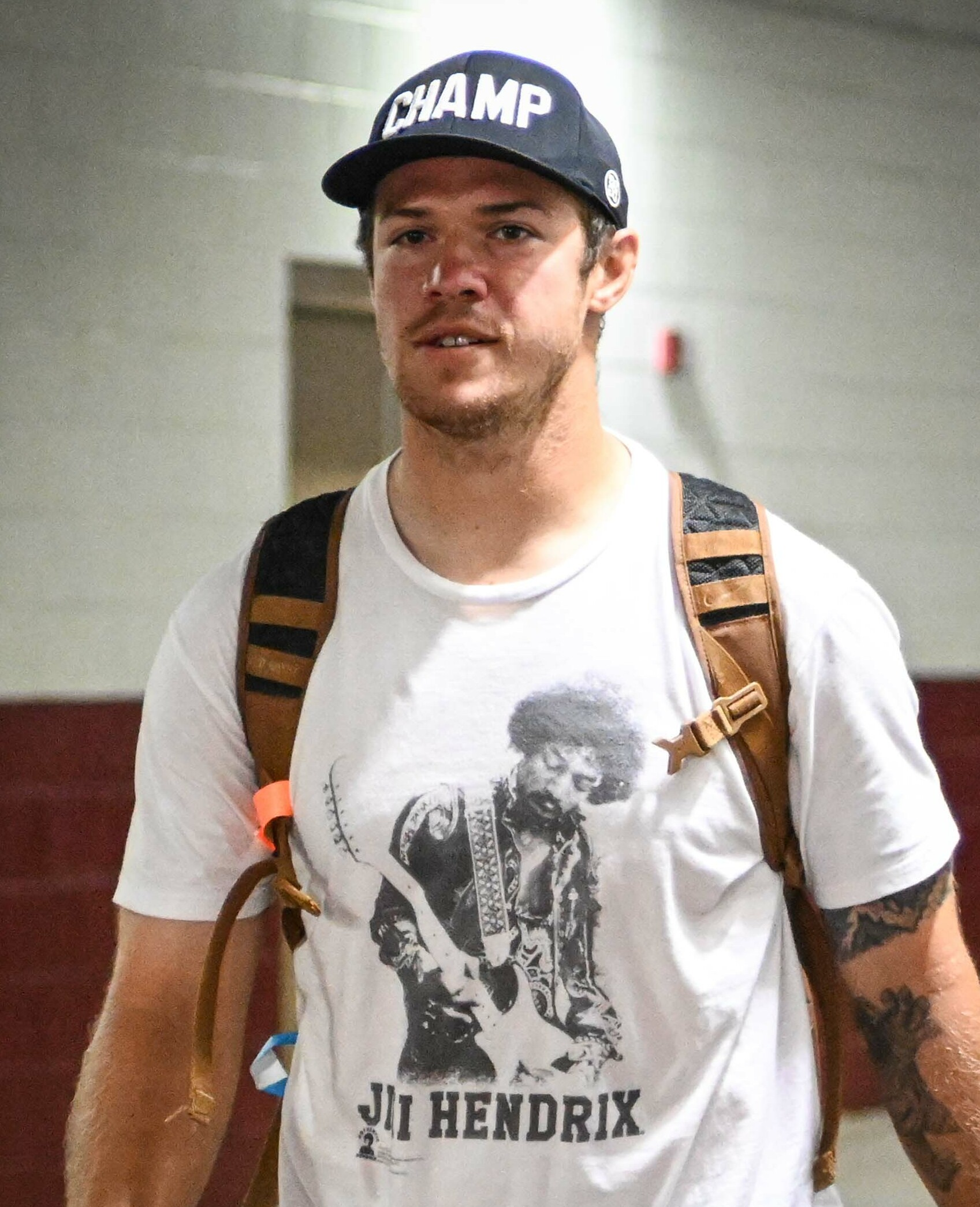
- Heinicke in 2022

No. 8, 6, 4
- Position: Quarterback

Personal information
- Born: March 15, 1993 (age 33); Lawrenceville, Georgia, U.S.
- Listed height: 6 ft 1 in (1.85 m)
- Listed weight: 210 lb (95 kg)

Career information
- High school: Collins Hill (Suwanee, Georgia)
- College: Old Dominion (2011–2014)
- NFL draft: 2015: undrafted

Career history
- Minnesota Vikings (2015–2017); New England Patriots (2017)*; Houston Texans (2017); Carolina Panthers (2018); St. Louis BattleHawks (2020); Washington Football Team / Commanders (2020–2022); Atlanta Falcons (2023); Los Angeles Chargers (2024)
- * Offseason or practice squad member only

Awards and highlights
- Walter Payton Award (2012); FCS Player of the Year (2012); CAA Offensive Player of the Year (2012); Dudley Award (2012); FCS All-American (2012); National Freshman Performer of the Year (2011); Old Dominion Monarchs No. 14 retired

Career NFL statistics
- Passing attempts: 971
- Passing completions: 607
- Completion percentage: 62.5%
- TD–INT: 39–28
- Passing yards: 6,663
- Passer rating: 84.1
- Stats at Pro Football Reference

Taylor Heinicke (/ˈhaɪnɪki/ HIGH-nih-kee; born March 15, 1993) is an American former professional football player who was a quarterback in the National Football League (NFL). He played college football for the Old Dominion Monarchs and joined the NFL as an undrafted free agent in 2015, having played with Minnesota Vikings, New England Patriots, Houston Texans, Carolina Panthers, Washington Football Team / Commanders, Atlanta Falcons, and Los Angeles Chargers.

Heinicke saw play for three seasons with Washington. In 2020, he replaced an injured Alex Smith by starting during the Wild Card Round against the Tampa Bay Buccaneers. Heinicke later started most of the 2021 season following an injury to Ryan Fitzpatrick, setting an unofficial NFL record for most completions by a quarterback in his first three starts. Heinicke also started the majority of the 2022 season after an injury to Carson Wentz. Heinicke was cited as an underdog due to his ability to lead teams to wins despite the perceived lack of prototypical size and arm talent.

== Early life ==
Taylor Heinicke was born on March 15, 1993, in Lawrenceville, Georgia. His father is Brett Heinicke. Heinicke played football under head coach Kevin Reach at Collins Hill High School in Lawrenceville, where he was an all-state selection as a junior after guiding Collins Hill to a 10–4 record and a trip to the Class AAAAA semi-finals. As a senior, Heinicke was named the Old Spice National Player of the Year in the state of Georgia. The award is presented annually to 50 high school varsity football athletes. He was also the Gwinnett Daily Post's Offensive Player of the Year after his record season when he threw for 4,218 yards, the second most in state history, and 44 touchdowns, which is the third-best ever in Georgia, setting Gwinnett County single-season records for passing yards and touchdowns. Heinicke threw for over 300 yards in nine games and also ran for 354 yards on 77 carries along with a pair of touchdowns. Following his senior year, Heinicke was invited to play at the North/South All-Star Football Classic, where he collected 254 yards and three touchdowns en route to MVP honors after helping the North to a 22–0 victory over the South. He appeared on the reality TV show The Ride, which featured high school quarterbacks competing for a spot in the U.S. Army All-American Bowl.

== College career ==
In 2011, Heinicke accepted an athletic scholarship to attend Old Dominion University (ODU), where he played for the Monarchs from 2011 to 2014. As a freshman, Heinicke led the Monarchs to a 10–3 record in the Colonial Athletic Association (CAA) before losing in the second round of the FCS playoffs against Georgia Southern. He threw for 2,385 yards, 25 touchdowns, and an interception, and he ran for 363 yards and four touchdowns. Heinicke also punted four times for 170 yards. He was named to the All-CAA third-team and was the National Freshman Performer of the Year.

In 2012, Heinicke led the Monarchs to an 11–2 record, losing in the playoffs quarterfinals, again to Georgia Southern. That year, Heinicke passed for an FCS-record 5,076 yards, 44 touchdowns, and 14 interceptions. He ran for 470 yards and 11 touchdowns. Heinicke also punted 11 times for 475 yards. On September 22, 2012, against New Hampshire, he passed for a Division I-record 730 yards and threw five touchdowns. Following the postseason loss, he was awarded All-American honors, CAA Offensive Player of the Year, the Walter Payton Award, and was named FCS Player of the Year by the Touchdown Club of Columbus.

For the 2013 season, Old Dominion began a transition to Conference USA, meaning for the 2013 season, ODU was an independent team. Despite this, Heinicke led ODU to an 8–4 record against mostly FCS opponents. During the season, he passed for 4,022 yards, 33 touchdowns, and eight interceptions. Heinicke ran for 348 yards and 5 touchdowns. He also punted 13 times for a total of 539 yards, also kicking the longest punt on the team for the season of 61 yards. In 2013, Heinicke became just the 18th quarterback from Division I to pass for 10,000 career yards and rush for 1,000. His 2013 season marks placed him in the top ten among FBS quarterbacks in passing yards, passing yards per game and touchdown passes.

For the 2014 season, Heinicke led ODU to a 6–6 record. During the season, he passed for 3,476 yards, 30 touchdowns, and 16 interceptions. Heinicke ran for 139 yards and two touchdowns. He also punted 14 times for a total of 661 yards. In September 2026, it was announced that Heinicke is to have his jersey retired by the Monarchs on October 15, 2026.

== Professional career ==
Pre-draft measurables
Height	Weight	Arm length	Hand span	Wingspan	40-yard dash	10-yard split	20-yard split	20-yard shuttle	Three-cone drill	Vertical jump	Broad jump
6 ft 0 3/8 in (1.84 m)	214 lb (97 kg)	29 in (0.74 m)	9 1/4 in (0.23 m)	6 ft 0 1/4 in (1.84 m)	4.62 s	1.59 s	2.55 s	4.21 s	6.96 s	35 in (0.89 m)	10 ft 3 in (3.12 m)
All values from Pro Day

=== Minnesota Vikings ===
Heinicke went undrafted in the 2015 NFL draft, but signed with the Minnesota Vikings as an undrafted free agent. He competed against veterans Mike Kafka and Shaun Hill to back up Vikings' starting quarterback Teddy Bridgewater. Kafka was placed on injured reserve, making way for Heinicke to be the third-string quarterback.

On September 3, 2016, Heinicke was placed on the reserve/NFI list with an off-the-field injury suffered between minicamp and training camp. He was activated to the active roster on November 8.

On September 2, 2017, Heinicke was waived/injured by the Vikings and was placed on the injured reserve list. He was released with an injury settlement nine days later.

=== New England Patriots ===
On September 23, 2017, Heinicke was signed to the practice squad of the New England Patriots. He was released on October 9.

=== Houston Texans ===
On November 29, 2017, Heinicke was signed to the Houston Texans' practice squad. He was promoted to the active roster on December 15 to back up T. J. Yates, following an injury to Tom Savage. Ten days later, Heinicke made his NFL debut against the Pittsburgh Steelers on Christmas Day after Yates suffered a head injury. However, after completing his only pass attempt, Heinicke suffered a concussion and was replaced by Yates, who had just passed the concussion protocol. The Texans would go on to lose 34–6.

On April 13, 2018, Heinicke was released by the Texans.

=== Carolina Panthers ===
On April 16, 2018, Heinicke was claimed off waivers by the Carolina Panthers. During the 2018 season, he appeared in six games for the Panthers, including being named starter for Week 16 against the Atlanta Falcons. Starting quarterback Cam Newton was ruled out for the remainder of the season with a shoulder injury. In his first start against the Falcons, Heinicke completed 33-of-53 passes for 274 yards, a touchdown and three interceptions before leaving the eventual 24–10 loss with an elbow injury. His injury was significant enough that he was placed on injured reserve for the regular-season finale.

On March 12, 2019, Heinicke re-signed with the Panthers. On August 30, he was released during final roster cuts.

=== St. Louis BattleHawks ===
On November 22, 2019, Heinicke was allocated to the St. Louis BattleHawks of the XFL in a supplemental draft held before the 2020 XFL draft. However, he did not see the field during the season and recorded no statistics. Heinicke had his contract terminated when the league suspended operations in April 2020 due to the COVID-19 pandemic.

=== Washington Football Team / Commanders ===
==== 2020 season ====
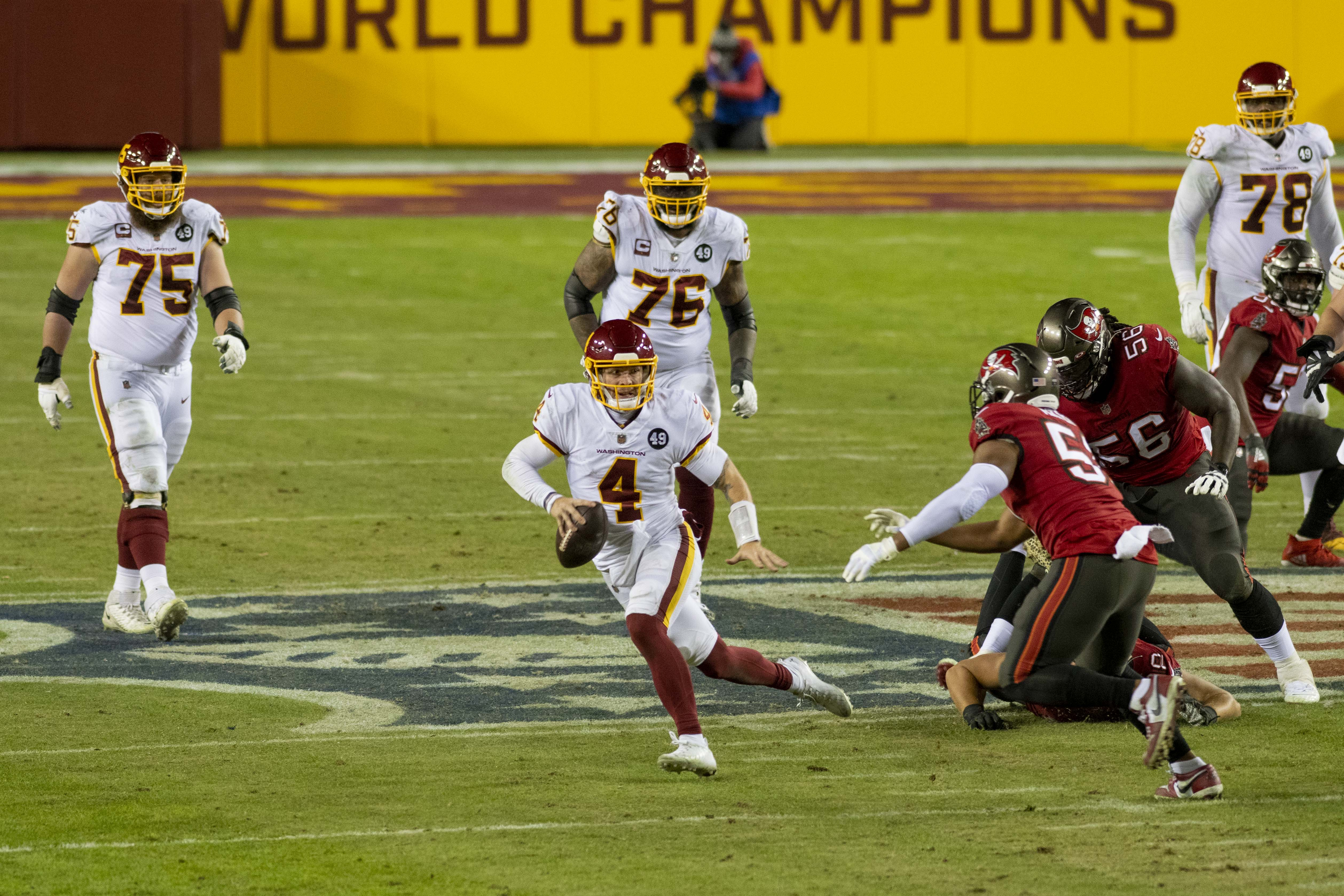
Heinicke with the Washington Football Team in a 2020 Wild Card playoff game against the Tampa Bay Buccaneers

On December 8, 2020, Heinicke was signed to the practice squad of the Washington Football Team. Prior to joining them, he was in the process of finishing his engineering degree at Old Dominion. On December 19, Heinicke was promoted to the active roster. During Week 16 against his former team, the Carolina Panthers, he made his Washington debut after starting quarterback Dwayne Haskins was benched in the fourth quarter. Heinicke completed 12-of-19 passes for 137 yards and a touchdown during the 20–13 loss. Haskins was released the following day and Alex Smith was named the starter.

Heinicke started the team's Wild Card Round playoff game against the Tampa Bay Buccaneers after Smith was ruled out due to a calf injury. In his second career start, Heinicke completed 26-of-44 passes for 306 yards, a touchdown, and an interception while also rushing for 46 yards and a touchdown, during the 31–23 loss.

==== 2021 season ====
As an impending restricted free agent in 2021, Heinicke signed a two-year, $4.75 million contract extension with the team on February 10.

During the season opener against the Los Angeles Chargers, Heinicke came in to relieve starting quarterback Ryan Fitzpatrick, who left in the second quarter with a hip injury. Heinicke was named the starter after Fitzpatrick was placed on injured reserve following the game. The following week, Heinicke's first start came against the New York Giants, in which he threw for 336 yards and two touchdowns during a narrow 30–29 victory. After Week 2, Heinicke set an NFL record for the most completions by a quarterback in their first three starts (93). However since NFL postseason statistics do not officially count and Heinicke's second start came in the playoffs, this is not an official record.

During Week 10 against Super Bowl LV champion Buccaneers, Heinicke threw for 256 yards and a touchdown in a 29–19 upset victory. In the next game against his former team, the Panthers, Heinicke recorded 206 passing yards and three touchdowns to go along with 29 rushing yards during a 27–21 road victory. On December 17, 2021, Heinicke and Allen were placed on the team's COVID-19 reserve list and forced to miss the Week 15 game against the Philadelphia Eagles. The team signed Garrett Gilbert in Heinicke's place off the New England Patriots' practice squad. Gilbert would go on to play in a 29–19 loss. Heinicke was placed back on the active roster on December 23. During a Week 16 56–14 road loss to the Dallas Cowboys, Heinicke left in the fourth quarter after getting injured on a sack from defensive tackle Neville Gallimore. Kyle Allen, again serving as backup to Heinicke with another team, replaced him. In the loss, the latter went 11-of-25 pass completions for 122 yards, a touchdown, and an interception.

==== 2022 season ====
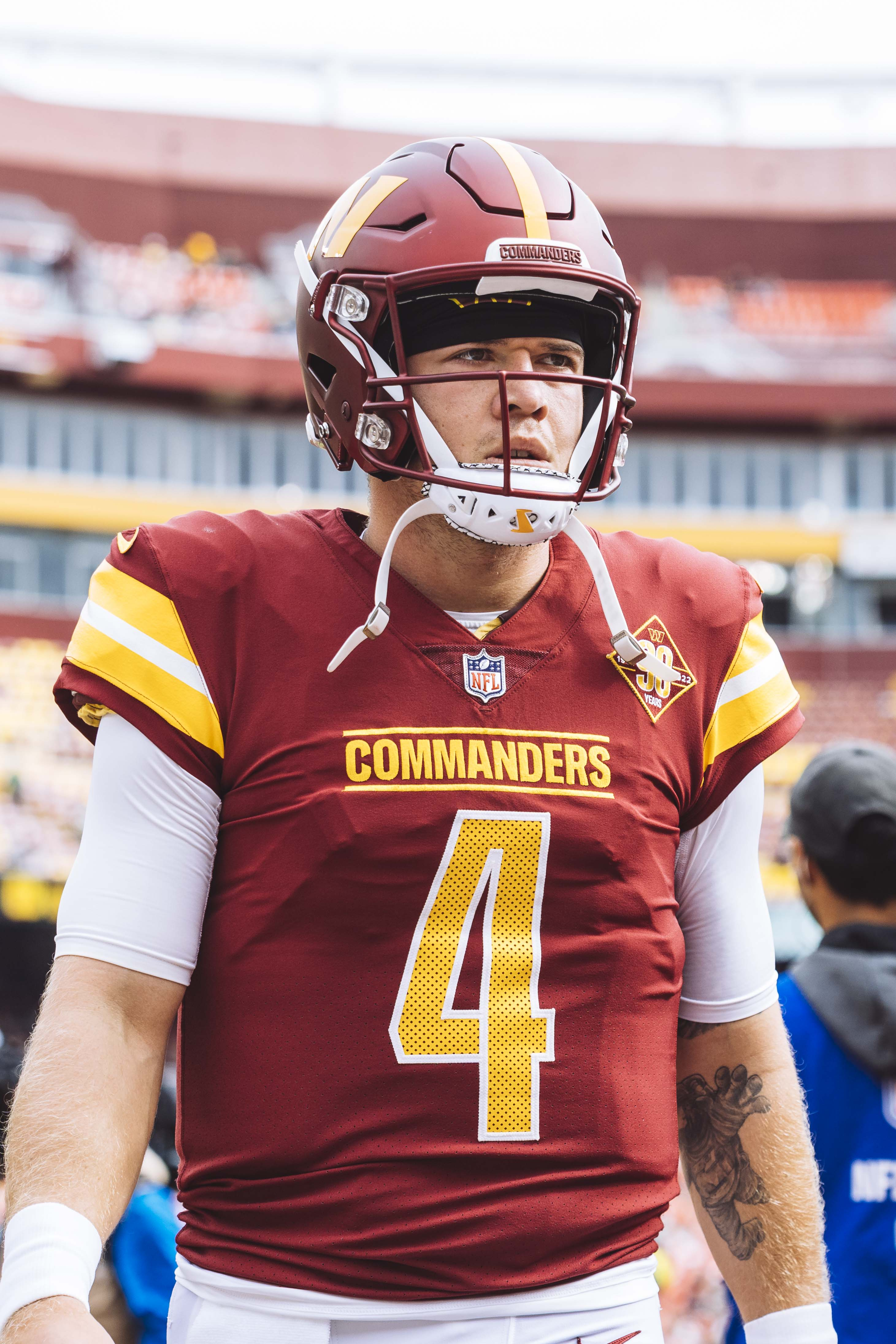
Heinicke with the Commanders in 2022

At the start of the 2022 season, Heinicke was named the backup behind Carson Wentz. After Wentz was ruled out due to a fractured finger, head coach Ron Rivera named Heinicke as the starting quarterback in Week 7. In his season debut, Heinicke threw for 200 yards, two touchdowns, and an interception during a narrow 23–21 victory over the Green Bay Packers. His nine-yard touchdown caught by Antonio Gibson was the 3,000th touchdown in the franchise's history, and the ball was placed in the Pro Football Hall of Fame. In the next game against the Indianapolis Colts, Heinicke completed 23-of-31 passes for 279 yards, a touchdown, and an interception during the narrow 17–16 victory. The following week, Heinicke threw for 149 yards, two touchdowns, and one interception, while adding 17 yards on the ground, in a close loss at home to his former Vikings team.

During Week 10 against the undefeated Eagles at Lincoln Financial Field, Heinicke completed 17-of-29 passes for 211 yards, along with one interception, as the Commanders upset the Eagles 32–21. During a Week 16 37–20 road loss to the San Francisco 49ers, Heinicke was benched in the fourth quarter as the 49ers led 30–14. He reverted to the backup role after Wentz was reinstated as the team's starting quarterback for Week 17.

=== Atlanta Falcons ===
On March 16, 2023, Heinicke signed a two-year, $14 million contract with his hometown team, the Atlanta Falcons. Upon signing, he was named the backup for starter Desmond Ridder.

During a Week 8 28–23 road loss to the Tennessee Titans, Heinicke came in relief of Ridder in the second half and recorded 175 passing yards and a touchdown to go along with 14 rushing yards. On November 1, Falcons head coach Arthur Smith named Heinicke the starting quarterback for the Week 9 matchup against the Vikings. In Week 10 against the Arizona Cardinals, Heinicke suffered a hamstring injury that would pull him out of the game. On November 20, Smith downgraded Heinicke to backup for the Falcons' Week 12 game against the New Orleans Saints. During Week 16 against the Colts, Heinicke would be reinstated as the team's starting quarterback, completing 23-of-33 pass attempts for 229 yards and a touchdown in the 29–10 victory.

In the 2024 offseason, the Falcons signed free agent Kirk Cousins and selected Michael Penix Jr. in the first round of the 2024 NFL draft, making Heinicke expendable.

=== Los Angeles Chargers ===
On August 29, 2024, the Falcons traded Heinicke to the Los Angeles Chargers in exchange for a conditional seventh-round pick in the 2025 NFL draft (Pick 218; Jack Nelson). Heinicke spent the season as the primary backup to Justin Herbert, appearing in four games and only attempting five passes during the 2024 season.

On March 13, 2025, Heinicke signed a one-year, $6.2 million contract extension with the Chargers. On August 26, Heinicke was released by the Chargers as part of final roster cuts after losing the backup job to Trey Lance.

On May 7, 2026, Heinicke announced his retirement from professional football on social media.

== Career statistics ==
=== NFL ===
Legend
**Bold**	Career high

==== Regular season ====
Year	Team	Games			Passing									Rushing					Sacks		Fumbles	
Year	Team	GP	GS	Record	Cmp	Att	Pct	Yds	Y/A	Lng	TD	Int	Rtg	Att	Yds	Y/A	Lng	TD	Sck	Yds	Fum	Lost
2015	MIN	0	0	—	DNP																	
2016	MIN	0	0	—	DNP																	
2017	HOU	1	0	—	1	1	**100.0**	10	**10.0**	10	0	0	**108.3**	1	2	2.0	2	0	1	16	0	0
2018	CAR	6	1	0–1	35	57	61.4	320	5.6	33	1	3	60.6	5	31	6.2	19	0	2	17	1	0
2020	WAS	1	0	—	12	19	63.2	137	7.2	29	1	0	102.3	3	22	7.3	12	0	1	7	0	0
2021	WAS	**16**	**15**	7–8	**321**	**494**	65.0	**3,419**	6.9	73	**20**	**15**	85.9	**60**	**313**	5.2	**38**	**1**	**38**	**278**	**7**	2
2022	WAS	9	9	**5–3–1**	161	259	62.2	1,859	7.2	61	12	6	89.6	28	96	3.4	15	**1**	19	141	**7**	**5**
2023	ATL	5	4	1–3	74	136	54.4	890	6.5	**75**	5	4	74.7	15	124	8.3	24	**1**	8	47	1	0
2024	LAC	4	0	—	3	5	60.0	28	5.6	18	0	0	75.4	2	20	**10.0**	12	0	3	28	0	0
Career		42	29	13–15–1	607	971	62.5	6,663	6.9	75	39	28	84.1	114	608	5.3	38	3	72	534	16	7

==== Postseason ====
Year	Team	Games			Passing									Rushing					Sacks		Fumbles	
Year	Team	GP	GS	Record	Cmp	Att	Pct	Yds	Y/A	Lng	TD	Int	Rtg	Att	Yds	Y/A	Lng	TD	Sck	Yds	Fum	Lost
2015	MIN	0	0	—	DNP																	
2020	WAS	1	1	0–1	26	44	59.1	306	7.0	36	1	1	78.4	6	46	7.7	13	1	2	17	0	0
2024	LAC	0	0	—	DNP																	
Career		1	1	0–1	26	44	59.1	306	7.0	36	1	1	78.4	6	46	7.7	13	1	2	17	0	0

=== College ===
Season	Team	Games			Passing								Rushing				Punting	
Season	Team	GP	GS	Record	Cmp	Att	Pct	Yds	Avg	TD	Int	Rtg	Att	Yds	Avg	TD	Num	Yds
2011	Old Dominion	9	8	6–2	211	307	68.7	2,385	7.8	25	1	160.2	68	363	**5.3**	4	4	170
2012	Old Dominion	**13**	**13**	**11–2**	**398**	**579**	68.7	**5,076**	**8.8**	**44**	14	**162.6**	**126**	**470**	3.7	**11**	11	415
2013	Old Dominion	12	12	8–4	340	486	**70.0**	4,022	8.3	33	8	158.6	93	348	3.7	5	13	539
2014	Old Dominion	12	12	6–6	289	457	63.2	3,476	7.6	30	**16**	141.8	80	139	1.7	2	**14**	**661**
Career		46	45	31–14	1,238	1,829	67.7	14,959	8.2	132	39	155.9	367	1,320	3.6	22	42	1,785
