= Oshane Ximines =

American football player (born 1996)

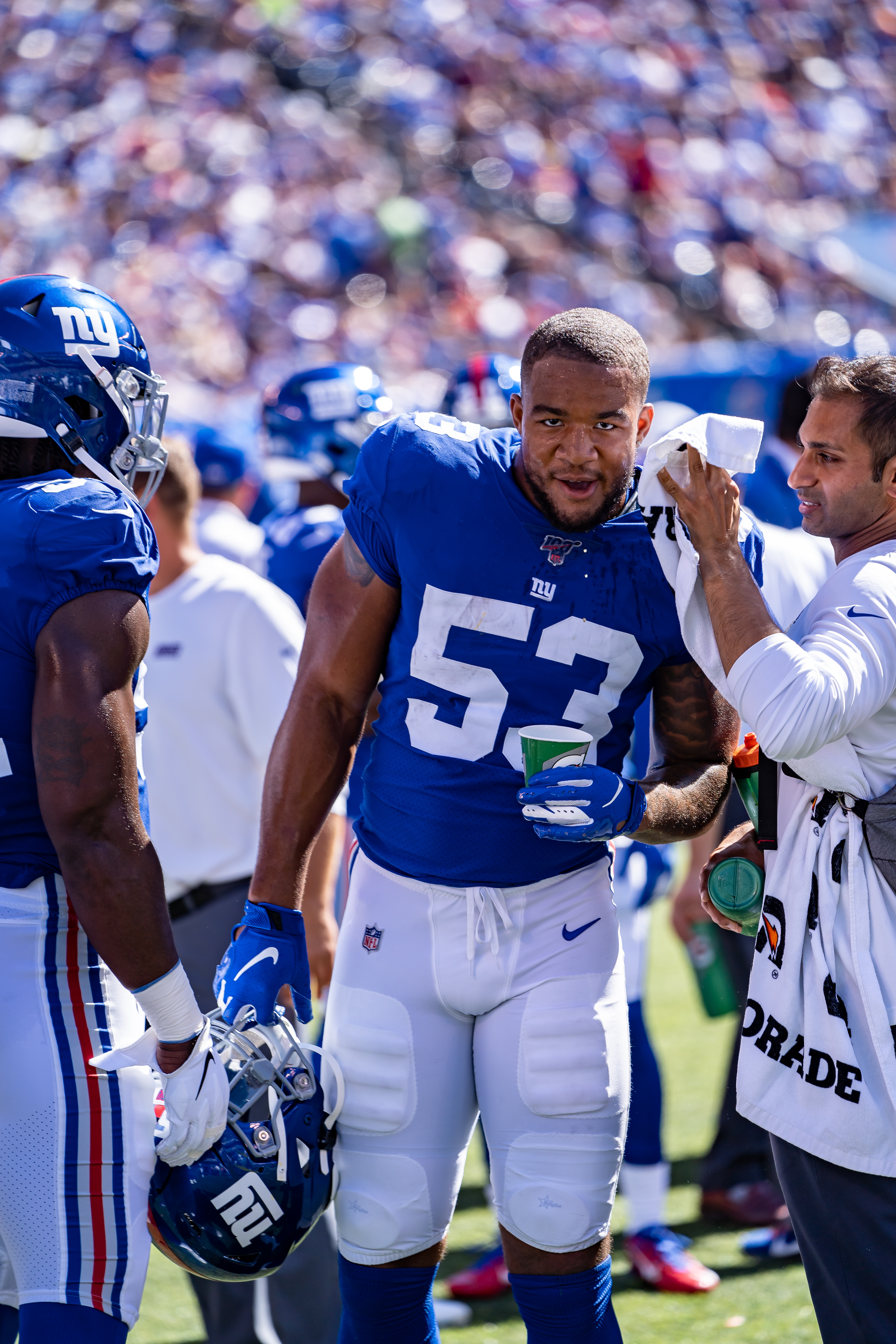
- Ximines with the New York Giants in 2019

Profile
- Position: Linebacker

Personal information
- Born: December 7, 1996 (age 29); Queens, New York, U.S.
- Listed height: 6 ft 4 in (1.93 m)
- Listed weight: 254 lb (115 kg)

Career information
- High school: Hertford County (NC)
- College: Old Dominion (2014–2018)
- NFL draft: 2019: 3rd round, 95th overall pick

Career history
- New York Giants (2019–2023); New England Patriots (2024)

Awards and highlights
- 2× First Team All C-USA (2017, 2018)

Career NFL statistics as of 2024
- Total tackles: 72
- Sacks: 6.5
- Forced fumbles: 1
- Fumble recoveries: 1
- Pass deflections: 6
- Stats at Pro Football Reference

Oshane Ximines (born December 7, 1996) is an American professional football linebacker. He played college football for the Old Dominion Monarchs. He is the only player in NFL history to have played with a last name beginning with the letter X.

== Early life ==
Ximines attended Hertford County High School in Ahoskie, North Carolina. During his career, he had 145 tackles and 35 sacks. He committed to Old Dominion University to play college football. His family immigrated to the United States from Jamaica before he was born.

== College career ==
Ximines played as a defensive end at Old Dominion from 2014 to 2018. During his career, he had 176 tackles, 32.5 sacks and one interception.

== Professional career ==
Pre-draft measurables
Height	Weight	Arm length	Hand span	40-yard dash	10-yard split	20-yard split	20-yard shuttle	Three-cone drill	Vertical jump	Broad jump	Bench press
6 ft 3 1/2 in (1.92 m)	253 lb (115 kg)	33 in (0.84 m)	9 7/8 in (0.25 m)	4.78 s	1.72 s	2.80 s	4.57 s	7.06 s	34.0 in (0.86 m)	9 ft 10 in (3.00 m)	24 reps
All values from NFL Combine/Pro Day

=== New York Giants ===
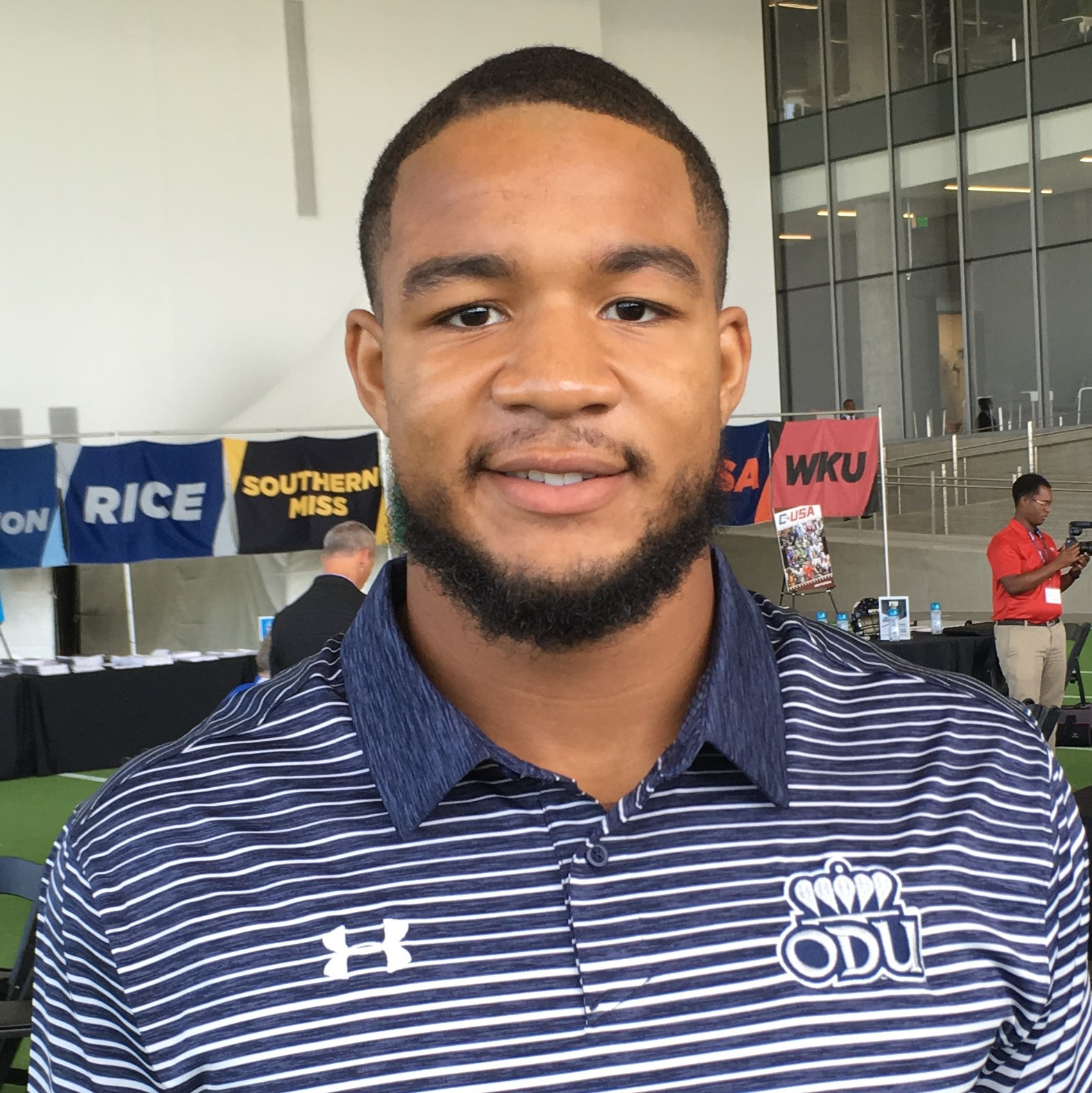
Ximines at 2018 C-USA Football Kickoff

Ximines was selected by the New York Giants in the third round (95th overall) of the 2019 NFL draft. He is the first ever player from Old Dominion to be taken in the NFL draft. The Giants previously acquired the selection as part of a trade that sent Odell Beckham Jr. and Olivier Vernon to the Cleveland Browns. In Week 3, against the Tampa Bay Buccaneers, Ximines recorded his first career sack, on Jameis Winston, in the 32–31 win. In Week 14 against the Philadelphia Eagles on Monday Night Football, Ximines sacked Carson Wentz twice during the 23–17 overtime loss. In addition, he switched positions from defensive end to outside linebacker.

Ximines entered 2020 as one of the Giants' starting pass rushers. He suffered a shoulder injury in Week 4 and was placed on injured reserve on October 9, 2020. He was designated to return from injured reserve on November 23, 2020, and began practicing with the team again, but underwent season-ending shoulder surgery the next week.

During the 2021 season, Ximines was used in a rotational role averaging 23 snaps per game. In Week 8 matchup against the Kansas City Chiefs, Ximines’ offsides penalty negated a fourth quarter interception by Darnay Holmes. Ximines finished the season with 13 tackles.

During the 2022 season, Ximines began training camp on the physically unable to perform list with a hamstring issue that sidelined him for most of the summer. During the season he appeared in 506 total snaps, 24 tackles, 2 sacks, 1 forced fumble, and 1 fumble recovery.

On May 5, 2023, Ximines was re-signed by the Giants. He was released on August 29, 2023, and re-signed to the practice squad. For the Week 2 game against the Arizona Cardinals, Ximines was elevated from the practice squad. He was released on November 30.

=== New England Patriots ===
On April 30, 2024, Ximines signed with the New England Patriots. He was placed on injured reserve on September 18.
