= List of Old Dominion Monarchs football seasons =

This is a list of seasons completed by the Old Dominion Monarchs football team of the National Collegiate Athletic Association (NCAA) Division I Football Bowl Subdivision, representing Old Dominion University in the East Division of the Sun Belt Conference. Old Dominion has played their home games at S.B. Ballard Stadium (formerly Foreman Field) in Norfolk, Virginia since 1936.

The Monarchs fielded their first team in 1930 under head coach Tommy Scott as the William & Mary Norfolk Division Braves. According to statistics, the NCAA does not recognize the Monarchs' 1930–1940 seasons.

== Seasons ==
Year	Team	Overall	Conference	Standing	Bowl/playoffs	Coaches^{#}	AP^{°}
Tommy Scott (Independent) (1930–1940)
1930	Braves	3–1					
1931	Braves	1–0–1					
1932	Braves	6–3–1					
1933	Braves	5–3					
1934	Braves	2–4–2					
1935	Braves	8–1					
1936	Braves	4–4					
1937	Braves	5–3					
1938	Braves	3–5–1					
1939	Braves	4–5					
1940	Braves	0–6					
Tommy Scott:		41–35–5					
Bobby Wilder (FCS independent) (2009–2010)
2009	Monarchs	9–2					
2010	Monarchs	8–3					
Bobby Wilder (Colonial Athletic Association) (2011–2012)
2011	Monarchs	10–3	6–2	T–2nd	L NCAA Division I Second Round	10	10
2012	Monarchs	11–2	7–1	1st †	L NCAA Division I Quarterfinal	3	3
Bobby Wilder (FCS independent) (2013)
2013	Monarchs	8–4					
Bobby Wilder (Conference USA) (2014–present)
2014	Monarchs	6–6	4–4	T–3rd (East)			
2015	Monarchs	5–7	3–5	T–4th (East)			
2016	Monarchs	10–3	7–1	T–1st (East)	W Bahamas Bowl		
2017	Monarchs	5–7	3–5	6th (East)			
2018	Monarchs	4–8	2–6	6th (East)			
2019	Monarchs	1–11	0–8	7th (East)			
Bobby Wilder:		77–56	32–32				
Ricky Rahne (Conference USA) (2020–2021)
2020	Monarchs	Canceled					
2021	Monarchs	6–7	5–3	T–2nd (East)	L Myrtle Beach Bowl		
Ricky Rahne (Sun Belt Conference) (2022–present)
2022	Monarchs	3–9	2–6	7th (East)			
2023	Monarchs	6–7	5–3	T–3rd (East)	L Famous Toastery Bowl		
2024	Monarchs	5–7	4–4	T–3rd (East)			
2025	Monarchs	10-3	6-2	2nd (East)	W StaffDNA Cure Bowl		
Ricky Rahne:		31-33	22-18				
Total:		104–89 (.539)					
National championship Conference title Conference division title or championship game berth
^{†}Indicates Bowl Coalition, Bowl Alliance, BCS, or CFP / New Years' Six bowl.; ^{#}Coaches Poll.; ^{°}The Sports Network poll from 2009 through 2013, and the AP Poll from 2014 onward..; † Old Dominion was voted ineligible for the CAA conference championship due to ODU's decision to leave for Conference USA.
