= List of Old Dominion Monarchs head football coaches =

The Old Dominion Monarchs college football team represents Old Dominion University in the East Division of Conference USA (C-USA). The Monarchs compete as part of the National Collegiate Athletic Association (NCAA) Division I Football Bowl Subdivision. The program has had 2 head coaches, since it began play during the 1930 season; the Monarchs played from 1930-1940 and then disbanded, only to field a team over sixty years later in 2009.

Old Dominion has played 178 games over 19 seasons, appearing in 1 bowl game (December 23, 2016) and winning no national championships. They competed in the Division I Football Championship Subdivision from the team's reincarnation in 2009 to 2013, appearing in the playoffs twice and finishing the 2012 season ranked #6 in the FCS, their peak final ranking in school history. to the As of December 8, 2016, the team's overall record is 108–66–4. The team's 100th win came in the 2016 season opener against Hampton, which ODU won 54–21. The Monarchs reached the first bowl game in school history when they finished the 2016 regular season 9-3 and accepted a bid to play Eastern Michigan in the Bahamas Bowl.

== Key ==
Key to symbols in coaches list
General		Overall		Conference		Postseason (Note: Although the first Rose Bowl Game was played in 1902, it has been continuously played since the 1916 game, and is recognized as the oldest bowl game by the NCAA. "—" indicates any season prior to 1916 when postseason games were not played.)	
No.	Order of coaches (Note: A running total of the number of head coaches, with coaches who served separate tenures being counted only once. Interim head coaches are represented with "Int" and are not counted in the running total. "—" indicates the team played but either without a coach or no coach is on record. "X" indicates an interim year without play.)	GC	Games coached	CW	Conference wins	PW	Postseason wins
DC	Division championships	OW	Overall wins	CL	Conference losses	PL	Postseason losses
CC	Conference championships	OL	Overall losses	CT	Conference ties	PT	Postseason ties
NC	National championships	OT	Overall ties (Note: Overtime rules in college football were introduced in 1996, making ties impossible in the period since.)	C%	Conference winning percentage		
†	Elected to the College Football Hall of Fame	O%	Overall winning percentage (Note: When computing the win–loss percentage, a tie counts as half a win and half a loss.)				

== Coaches ==
List of head football coaches showing season(s) coached, overall records, conference records, postseason records, championships and selected awards (Note: Statistics correct as of the end of the 2023 NCAA Division I FBS football season.)
No.	Name	Term	Season(s)	GC	OW	OL	OT	O%	CW	CL	CT	C%	PW	PL	PT	DC	CC	NC	Awards
1	Tommy Scott	1930–1940	11	82	41	35	5	0.537	—	—	—	—	—	—	—	—	—	0	
2	Bobby Wilder	2009–2019	11	133	77	56	—	0.579	32	32	—	0.500	3	2	—	1	0	0	
3	Ricky Rahne	2020–present	6	63	30	33	—	0.476	22	18	—	0.550	1	2	—	0	0	0	
