= Royal Rivalry =

American college sports rivalry

TowneBank Royal Rivalry Challenge

- James Madison Dukes Old Dominion Monarchs
- Sport: Multi-sport
- First meeting: October 29, 2011 (football); ODU 23 – JMU 20
- Latest meeting: September 26, 2026 (football); JMU 46 – ODU 20
- Stadiums: Bridgeforth Stadium, S.B. Ballard Stadium, Atlantic Union Bank Center, Chartway Arena
- Trophy: Crown

Statistics
- All-time series: James Madison leads, 3–0–1 (all-sports challenge)
- Trophy series: Royal Rivalry Trophy
- Largest victory: James Madison, 16.5–7.5 (2022)
- Longest win streak: James Madison, 2 (2022–2023)
- Current win streak: James Madison, 1 (2025–present)

Locations of James Madison and Old Dominion

The Royal Rivalry refers to the college rivalry games between the James Madison Dukes and the Old Dominion Monarchs of the Sun Belt Conference. It is an intra-conference match-up between two Division I FBS public universities based in the Commonwealth of Virginia: James Madison University and Old Dominion University.

== History ==
Both schools began sports competitions in the early 1970s as former Division II in-state opponents. The competitions intensified when both schools competed as full members of the Colonial Athletic Association following ODU's move to the conference in 1991. This undeclared in-state rivalry would last just over 20 years before ODU relocated to Conference USA in 2014 to become a member of the FBS. JMU remained in the CAA as a FCS member and still competed with ODU in sports outside of football. In 2022, both schools joined the Sun Belt Conference.

Following the conference relocation for both schools, ODU and JMU announced the TowneBank-sponsored Royal Rivalry Challenge. Starting in 2022, it would include all 20 head-to-head matchups in sports between the schools with points awarded to each school for corresponding victories in the games. Each school is awarded one point per game won and half of a point per game tied. The yearly winner is to be awarded the Royal Rivalry Trophy, resembling a crown-shaped plaque.

== Series results ==
=== All-time results ===
| Sport | All-time series record | Last result | Next meeting | Source |
|---|---|---|---|---|
| Men's Basketball | ODU leads 59–36 | JMU won 70–69 on January 10, 2026 | TBD | |
| Women's Basketball | ODU leads 53–34 | JMU won 77–55 on February 25, 2026 | TBD | |
| Football | JMU leads 5–2 | JMU won 46–20 on September 26, 2026 | 2027 at JMU | |
| Men's Soccer | JMU leads 20–14–9 | Tied 1–1 on October 31, 2025 | TBD | |

=== Royal Rivalry results ===
| James Madison victories | Old Dominion victories | Tie games |

| No. | Date | Winning team | | Losing team | | Series |
|---|---|---|---|---|---|---|
| 1 | 2022–23 | James Madison | 16.5 | Old Dominion | 7.5 | James Madison 1–0 |
| 2 | 2023–24 | James Madison | 14.5 | Old Dominion | 7.5 | James Madison 2–0 |
| 3 | 2024–25 | Tie | 11.0 | Tie | 11.0 | James Madison 2–0–1 |
| 4 | 2025–26 | James Madison | 9.5 | Old Dominion | 7.5 | James Madison 3–0–1 |

== Football ==
The Old Dominion and James Madison football programs began competing in 2011 when ODU joined the CAA as an FCS independent after restarting football in 2009. Following ODU's departure from the CAA in 2012, the two schools took nearly a ten-year hiatus from football matchups before they both joined the Sun Belt in 2022. The football rivalry was restarted in the 2022 Div. I FBS football season where both schools competed in the 2022 Oyster Bowl, with the Dukes beating the Monarchs for the first time 37–3.

James Madison currently plays their football games at Bridgeforth Stadium; Old Dominion at S.B. Ballard Stadium.

| James Madison victories | Old Dominion victories | Tie games |

| No. | Date | Location | Winning team | | Losing team | | Series |
|---|---|---|---|---|---|---|---|
| 1 | October 29, 2011 | Foreman Field | #15 (FCS) Old Dominion | 23 | #9 (FCS) James Madison | 20 | Old Dominion 1–0 |
| 2 | November 17, 2012 | Bridgeforth Stadium | #4 (FCS) Old Dominion | 38 | #13 (FCS) James Madison | 28 | Old Dominion 2–0 |
| 3 | November 12, 2022 | S.B. Ballard Stadium | James Madison | 37 | Old Dominion | 3 | Old Dominion 2–1 |
| 4 | October 28, 2023 | Bridgeforth Stadium | #25 James Madison | 30 | Old Dominion | 27 | Tied 2–2 |
| 5 | November 16, 2024 | S.B. Ballard Stadium | James Madison | 35 | Old Dominion | 32 | James Madison 3–2 |
| 6 | October 18, 2025 | Bridgeforth Stadium | James Madison | 63 | Old Dominion | 27 | James Madison 4–2 |
| 7 | September 26, 2026 | S.B. Ballard Stadium | James Madison | 46 | Old Dominion | 20 | James Madison 5–2 |

- Source: JMU Sports

== Basketball ==
=== Men's basketball ===
During their tenures in the CAA, ODU defeated JMU in 4 conference tournament championships. JMU holds their basketball games at Atlantic Union Bank Center; ODU at Chartway Arena.

| Old Dominion victories | James Madison victories |

| No. | Date | Location | Winner | Score |
|---|---|---|---|---|
| 1 | January 14, 1972 | Norfolk, VA | Old Dominion | 99–68 |
| 2 | December 13, 1972 | Norfolk, VA | Old Dominion | 69–55 |
| 3 | February 26, 1973 | Harrisonburg, VA | Old Dominion | 67–49 |
| 4 | January 28, 1974 | Harrisonburg, VA | Old Dominion | 65–55 |
| 5 | January 15, 1975 | Norfolk, VA | Old Dominion | 89–54 |
| 6 | January 28, 1976 | Harrisonburg, VA | Old Dominion | 87–83^{OT} |
| 7 | March 11, 1976 | Norfolk, VA | Old Dominion | 86–77 |
| 8 | February 26, 1977 | Norfolk, VA | Old Dominion | 97–77 |
| 9 | February 8, 1978 | Harrisonburg, VA | James Madison | 74–65 |
| 10 | January 24, 1979 | Norfolk, VA | Old Dominion | 75–65 |
| 11 | January 29, 1980 | Norfolk, VA | Old Dominion | 52–44 |
| 12 | February 9, 1980 | Harrisonburg, VA | Old Dominion | 82–63 |
| 13 | January 21, 1981 | Harrisonburg, VA | Old Dominion | 65–63^{OT} |
| 14 | February 18, 1981 | Norfolk, VA | James Madison | 73–65 |
| 15 | January 20, 1982 | Harrisonburg, VA | James Madison | 60–48 |
| 16 | February 27, 1982 | Norfolk, VA | James Madison | 43–41 |
| 17 | March 6, 1982 | Norfolk, VA | Old Dominion | 58–57 |
| 18 | January 15, 1983 | Harrisonburg, VA | James Madison | 63–52 |
| 19 | January 31, 1983 | Norfolk, VA | Old Dominion | 58–43 |
| 20 | January 11, 1984 | Norfolk, VA | Old Dominion | 61–58 |
| 21 | February 1, 1984 | Harrisonburg, VA | James Madison | 68–67^{OT} |
| 22 | December 15, 1984 | Norfolk, VA | Old Dominion | 65–57 |
| 23 | January 8, 1985 | Harrisonburg, VA | James Madison | 80–68 |
| 24 | December 14, 1985 | Norfolk, VA | Old Dominion | 57–50 |
| 25 | February 3, 1986 | Harrisonburg, VA | Old Dominion | 59–53 |
| 26 | December 14, 1986 | Harrisonburg, VA | James Madison | 71–69 |
| 27 | December 28, 1987 | Norfolk, VA | Old Dominion | 65–58 |
| 28 | January 4, 1989 | Harrisonburg, VA | Old Dominion | 79–77 |
| 29 | December 30, 1989 | Norfolk, VA | Old Dominion | 85–81 |
| 30 | January 30, 1991 | Harrisonburg, VA | James Madison | 79–75 |
| 31 | January 18, 1992 | Harrisonburg, VA | James Madison | 92–76 |
| 32 | February 15, 1992 | Norfolk, VA | Old Dominion | 72–71 |
| 33 | March 9, 1992 | Richmond, VA | Old Dominion | 78–73 |
| 34 | January 18, 1993 | Harrisonburg, VA | James Madison | 102–89 |
| 35 | February 17, 1993 | Norfolk, VA | Old Dominion | 92–88 |
| 36 | January 8, 1994 | Harrisonburg, VA | James Madison | 96–88 |
| 37 | February 5, 1994 | Norfolk, VA | Old Dominion | 97–81 |
| 38 | March 7, 1994 | Richmond, VA | James Madison | 77–76 |
| 39 | January 25, 1995 | Norfolk, VA | Old Dominion | 79–65 |
| 40 | February 4, 1995 | Harrisonburg, VA | James Madison | 95–79 |
| 41 | March 6, 1995 | Richmond, VA | Old Dominion | 80–75 |
| 42 | January 24, 1996 | Harrisonburg, VA | Old Dominion | 58–45 |
| 43 | February 10, 1996 | Norfolk, VA | Old Dominion | 76–72 |
| 44 | March 2, 1996 | Richmond, VA | Old Dominion | 75–72 |
| 45 | January 25, 1997 | Harrisonburg, VA | James Madison | 84–66 |
| 46 | February 24, 1997 | Norfolk, VA | Old Dominion | 72–66 |
| 47 | March 3, 1997 | Richmond, VA | Old Dominion | 62–58^{OT} |
| 48 | January 10, 1998 | Harrisonburg, VA | Old Dominion | 61–60 |

| No. | Date | Location | Winner | Score |
|---|---|---|---|---|
| 49 | February 7, 1998 | Norfolk, VA | James Madison | 51–46 |
| 50 | February 27, 1998 | Richmond, VA | Old Dominion | 60–56 |
| 51 | January 6, 1999 | Norfolk, VA | Old Dominion | 60–58 |
| 52 | January 27, 1999 | Harrisonburg, VA | James Madison | 69–56 |
| 53 | January 12, 2000 | Norfolk, VA | James Madison | 70–66 |
| 54 | February 19, 2000 | Harrisonburg, VA | James Madison | 61–59 |
| 55 | January 3, 2001 | Norfolk, VA | Old Dominion | 80–63 |
| 56 | February 14, 2001 | Harrisonburg, VA | James Madison | 61–59 |
| 57 | January 30, 2002 | Harrisonburg, VA | James Madison | 67–61 |
| 58 | February 16, 2002 | Norfolk, VA | Old Dominion | 73–68 |
| 59 | January 25, 2003 | Norfolk, VA | Old Dominion | 74–56 |
| 60 | February 8, 2003 | Harrisonburg, VA | James Madison | 74–66 |
| 61 | January 14, 2004 | Harrisonburg, VA | Old Dominion | 81–60 |
| 62 | February 11, 2004 | Norfolk, VA | Old Dominion | 71–57 |
| 63 | January 8, 2005 | Norfolk, VA | Old Dominion | 76–43 |
| 64 | February 26, 2005 | Harrisonburg, VA | Old Dominion | 82–60 |
| 65 | February 4, 2006 | Norfolk, VA | Old Dominion | 87–69 |
| 66 | February 23, 2006 | Harrisonburg, VA | Old Dominion | 75–58 |
| 67 | January 17, 2007 | Harrisonburg, VA | James Madison | 72–65 |
| 68 | December 2, 2007 | Norfolk, VA | Old Dominion | 70–57 |
| 69 | January 16, 2008 | Norfolk, VA | Old Dominion | 79–52 |
| 70 | February 20, 2008 | Harrisonburg, VA | Old Dominion | 72–52 |
| 71 | January 7, 2009 | Norfolk, VA | James Madison | 70–62 |
| 72 | January 28, 2009 | Harrisonburg, VA | Old Dominion | 80–74 |
| 73 | March 26, 2009 | Norfolk, VA | Old Dominion | 81–43 |
| 74 | January 6, 2010 | Norfolk, VA | Old Dominion | 74–72 |
| 75 | February 10, 2010 | Harrisonburg, VA | Old Dominion | 64–44 |
| 76 | January 19, 2011 | Norfolk, VA | Old Dominion | 64–58 |
| 77 | February 24, 2011 | Harrisonburg, VA | Old Dominion | 75–59 |
| 78 | January 2, 2012 | Harrisonburg, VA | Old Dominion | 67–61^{OT} |
| 79 | February 2, 2012 | Norfolk, VA | Old Dominion | 80–71 |
| 80 | January 2, 2013 | Norfolk, VA | James Madison | 58–55 |
| 81 | January 26, 2013 | Harrisonburg, VA | James Madison | 56–46 |
| 82 | November 11, 2016 | Norfolk, VA | Old Dominion | 62–55 |
| 83 | November 13, 2017 | Harrisonburg, VA | Old Dominion | 69–53 |
| 84 | December 1, 2018 | Norfolk, VA | Old Dominion | 67–42 |
| 85 | November 20, 2019 | Norfolk, VA | James Madison | 80–78 |
| 86 | November 13, 2021 | Harrisonburg, VA | James Madison | 58–53 |
| 87 | February 2, 2023 | Norfolk, VA | James Madison | 78–73 |
| 88 | February 16, 2023 | Harrisonburg, VA | James Madison | 76–67 |
| 89 | December 9, 2023 | Norfolk, VA | #18 James Madison | 84–69 |
| 90 | January 24, 2024 | Norfolk, VA | James Madison | 78–62 |
| 91 | February 3, 2024 | Harrisonburg, VA | James Madison | 78–63 |
| 92 | January 22, 2025 | Norfolk, VA | James Madison | 74–60 |
| 93 | February 1, 2025 | Harrisonburg, VA | James Madison | 68–54 |
| 94 | December 17, 2025 | Norfolk, VA | Old Dominion | 77–68 |
| 95 | January 10, 2026 | Harrisonburg, VA | James Madison | 70–69 |
Series: Old Dominion leads 59–36

=== Women's basketball ===
JMU holds their basketball games at Atlantic Union Bank Center; ODU at Chartway Arena.

| Old Dominion victories | James Madison victories |

| No. | Date | Location | Winner | Score |
|---|---|---|---|---|
| 1 | December 13, 1969 | Norfolk, VA | Old Dominion | 66–39 |
| 2 | January 17, 1970 | Harrisonburg, VA | Old Dominion | 41–21 |
| 3 | December 16, 1970 | Harrisonburg, VA | James Madison | 43–37 |
| 4 | January 31, 1971 | Lynchburg, VA | James Madison | 65–44 |
| 5 | January 19, 1972 | Norfolk, VA | James Madison | 51–38 |
| 6 | December 13, 1972 | Harrisonburg, VA | Old Dominion | 23–12 |
| 7 | February 27, 1975 | Lynchburg, VA | James Madison | 85–42 |
| 8 | November 25, 1975 | Harrisonburg, VA | James Madison | 83–60 |
| 9 | December 11, 1976 | Norfolk, VA | Old Dominion | 99–65 |
| 10 | March 5, 1977 | Norfolk, VA | Old Dominion | 81–54 |
| 11 | February 8, 1978 | Harrisonburg, VA | Old Dominion | 72–44 |
| 12 | January 24, 1979 | Norfolk, VA | Old Dominion | 99–62 |
| 13 | March 3, 1979 | Blacksburg, VA | Old Dominion | 93–40 |
| 14 | February 7, 1980 | Harrisonburg, VA | Old Dominion | 91–53 |
| 15 | November 26, 1980 | Norfolk, VA | Old Dominion | 96–51 |
| 16 | February 2, 1982 | Harrisonburg, VA | Old Dominion | 91–50 |
| 17 | March 3, 1983 | Norfolk, VA | Old Dominion | 92–58 |
| 18 | February 24, 1984 | Harrisonburg, VA | Old Dominion | 75–54 |
| 19 | December 15, 1984 | Norfolk, VA | Old Dominion | 79–43 |
| 20 | January 15, 1986 | Harrisonburg, VA | James Madison | 65–53 |
| 21 | February 19, 1987 | Norfolk, VA | James Madison | 66–62 |
| 22 | February 15, 1988 | Harrisonburg, VA | James Madison | 75–69 |
| 23 | February 1, 1989 | Norfolk, VA | Old Dominion | 83–51 |
| 24 | January 18, 1990 | Harrisonburg, VA | Old Dominion | 82–66 |
| 25 | January 9, 1991 | Norfolk, VA | James Madison | 76–61 |
| 26 | January 18, 1992 | Norfolk, VA | Old Dominion | 64–62 |
| 27 | February 15, 1992 | Harrisonburg, VA | James Madison | 70–69 |
| 28 | January 24, 1993 | Harrisonburg, VA | Old Dominion | 71–42 |
| 29 | February 21, 1993 | Norfolk, VA | Old Dominion | 67–44 |
| 30 | January 16, 1994 | Harrisonburg, VA | Old Dominion | 71–49 |
| 31 | February 13, 1994 | Norfolk, VA | Old Dominion | 73–59 |
| 32 | January 6, 1995 | Norfolk, VA | Old Dominion | 68–64 |
| 33 | February 19, 1995 | Harrisonburg, VA | James Madison | 87–80 |
| 34 | March 11, 1995 | Norfolk, VA | Old Dominion | 63–44 |
| 35 | January 26, 1996 | Harrisonburg, VA | Old Dominion | 67–42 |
| 36 | February 28, 1996 | Norfolk, VA | Old Dominion | 77–64 |
| 37 | March 9, 1996 | Norfolk, VA | Old Dominion | 84–58 |
| 38 | January 17, 1997 | Harrisonburg, VA | Old Dominion | 78–53 |
| 39 | February 7, 1997 | Norfolk, VA | Old Dominion | 77–49 |
| 40 | February 28, 1997 | Richmond, VA | Old Dominion | 86–48 |
| 41 | January 16, 1998 | Harrisonburg, VA | Old Dominion | 76–65 |
| 42 | January 30, 1998 | Norfolk, VA | Old Dominion | 81–59 |
| 43 | January 22, 1999 | Norfolk, VA | Old Dominion | 79–52 |
| 44 | February 5, 1999 | Harrisonburg, VA | Old Dominion | 74–50 |

| No. | Date | Location | Winner | Score |
|---|---|---|---|---|
| 45 | March 4, 1999 | Richmond, VA | Old Dominion | 73–45 |
| 46 | January 16, 2000 | Norfolk, VA | Old Dominion | 74–57 |
| 47 | February 25, 2000 | Harrisonburg, VA | Old Dominion | 84–64 |
| 48 | January 7, 2001 | Norfolk, VA | Old Dominion | 62–56 |
| 49 | February 18, 2001 | Harrisonburg, VA | James Madison | 49–48 |
| 50 | March 10, 2001 | Norfolk, VA | Old Dominion | 66–62 |
| 51 | January 27, 2002 | Harrisonburg, VA | Old Dominion | 68–51 |
| 52 | February 17, 2002 | Norfolk, VA | Old Dominion | 67–53 |
| 53 | January 16, 2003 | Norfolk, VA | Old Dominion | 58–48 |
| 54 | February 9, 2003 | Harrisonburg, VA | James Madison | 98–95^{OT} |
| 55 | March 14, 2003 | Norfolk, VA | Old Dominion | 71–55 |
| 56 | January 9, 2004 | Harrisonburg, VA | Old Dominion | 75–73 |
| 57 | February 26, 2004 | Norfolk, VA | Old Dominion | 80–58 |
| 58 | January 6, 2005 | Harrisonburg, VA | Old Dominion | 80–58 |
| 59 | February 27, 2005 | Norfolk, VA | Old Dominion | 92–61 |
| 60 | January 22, 2006 | Norfolk, VA | Old Dominion | 72–63 |
| 61 | March 2, 2006 | Harrisonburg, VA | James Madison | 75–68 |
| 62 | March 11, 2006 | Fairfax, VA | Old Dominion | 58–54 |
| 63 | February 1, 2007 | Harrisonburg, VA | James Madison | 79–50 |
| 64 | February 25, 2007 | Norfolk, VA | Old Dominion | 62–57 |
| 65 | March 11, 2007 | Newark, DE | Old Dominion | 78–70 |
| 66 | January 13, 2008 | Norfolk, VA | Old Dominion | 82–57 |
| 67 | March 2, 2008 | Harrisonburg, VA | James Madison | 76–63 |
| 68 | January 25, 2009 | Norfolk, VA | James Madison | 72–67 |
| 69 | March 1, 2009 | Harrisonburg, VA | James Madison | 73–57 |
| 70 | January 17, 2010 | Harrisonburg, VA | Old Dominion | 67–58 |
| 71 | February 21, 2010 | Norfolk, VA | James Madison | 65–59 |
| 72 | March 14, 2010 | Harrisonburg, VA | James Madison | 67–53 |
| 73 | January 9, 2011 | Norfolk, VA | Old Dominion | 71–55 |
| 74 | February 6, 2011 | Harrisonburg, VA | James Madison | 67–58 |
| 75 | February 1, 2012 | Norfolk, VA | James Madison | 57–55 |
| 76 | February 26, 2012 | Harrisonburg, VA | James Madison | 63–44 |
| 77 | February 12, 2013 | Norfolk, VA | James Madison | 68–56 |
| 78 | February 28, 2013 | Harrisonburg, VA | James Madison | 77–61 |
| 79 | December 31, 2022 | Harrisonburg, VA | James Madison | 68–54 |
| 80 | February 18, 2023 | Norfolk, VA | James Madison | 73–68^{OT} |
| 81 | March 5, 2023 | Pensacola, FL | James Madison | 70–64 |
| 82 | January 20, 2024 | Harrisonburg, VA | James Madison | 72–64 |
| 83 | March 1, 2024 | Norfolk, VA | James Madison | 70–58 |
| 84 | February 1, 2025 | Norfolk, VA | James Madison | 85–62 |
| 85 | February 15, 2025 | Harrisonburg, VA | James Madison | 66–53 |
| 86 | February 14, 2026 | Norfolk, VA | James Madison | 87–53 |
| 87 | February 25, 2026 | Harrisonburg, VA | James Madison | 77–55 |
Series: Old Dominion leads 53–34

== Soccer ==
=== Men's soccer ===
James Madison leads the all-time series in soccer 20–14–9.

| Old Dominion victories | James Madison victories | Tie games |

| No. | Date | Location | Winner | Score |
|---|---|---|---|---|
| 1 | October 28, 1972 | Harrisonburg, VA | James Madison | 8–1 |
| 2 | October 21, 1973 | Norfolk, VA | James Madison | 4–0 |
| 3 | October 3, 1975 | Harrisonburg, VA | Old Dominion | 3–2 |
| 4 | November 20, 1975 | Harrisonburg, VA | James Madison | 2–1 |
| 5 | October 30, 1976 | Norfolk, VA | James Madison | 5–4 |
| 6 | October 28, 1977 | Harrisonburg, VA | James Madison | 2–0 |
| 7 | October 3, 1983 | Norfolk, VA | Tie | 0–0 |
| 8 | September 30, 1984 | Harrisonburg, VA | Old Dominion | 1–0 |
| 9 | October 22, 1986 | Norfolk, VA | James Madison | 2–1^{OT} |
| 10 | October 24, 1987 | Harrisonburg, VA | Old Dominion | 1–0 |
| 11 | October 20, 1988 | Norfolk, VA | Tie | 0–0 |
| 12 | October 18, 1989 | Harrisonburg, VA | James Madison | 1–0 |
| 13 | September 14, 1991 | Norfolk, VA | Old Dominion | 3–0 |
| 14 | November 10, 1991 | Norfolk, VA | Old Dominion | 1–0 |
| 15 | October 14, 1992 | Harrisonburg, VA | James Madison | 1–0 |
| 16 | October 9, 1993 | Norfolk, VA | James Madison | 1–0^{OT} |
| 17 | November 7, 1993 | Richmond, VA | James Madison | 3–0 |
| 18 | October 15, 1994 | Harrisonburg, VA | James Madison | 5–0 |
| 19 | November 11, 1994 | Williamsburg, VA | Tie | 1–1 |
| 20 | October 7, 1995 | Norfolk, VA | Old Dominion | 1–0 |
| 21 | November 6, 1996 | Harrisonburg, VA | James Madison | 4–0 |
| 22 | November 14, 1996 | Wilmington, NC | James Madison | 5–0 |

| No. | Date | Location | Winner | Score |
|---|---|---|---|---|
| 23 | October 11, 1997 | Norfolk, VA | Old Dominion | 1–0^{2OT} |
| 24 | October 17, 1998 | Harrisonburg, VA | James Madison | 2–0 |
| 25 | October 9, 1999 | Norfolk, VA | Old Dominion | 1–0 |
| 26 | October 28, 2000 | Harrisonburg, VA | James Madison | 3–0 |
| 27 | October 27, 2001 | Norfolk, VA | Tie | 0–0 |
| 28 | October 30, 2002 | Norfolk, VA | Tie | 1–1 |
| 29 | October 31, 2003 | Harrisonburg, VA | James Madison | 3–2 |
| 30 | October 22, 2004 | Norfolk, VA | Old Dominion | 1–0 |
| 31 | November 12, 2004 | Harrisonburg, VA | Old Dominion | 3–1 |
| 32 | October 23, 2005 | Norfolk, VA | James Madison | 2–1^{OT} |
| 33 | October 8, 2006 | Harrisonburg, VA | Tie | 1–1 |
| 34 | October 14, 2007 | Norfolk, VA | Old Dominion | 2–0 |
| 35 | October 22, 2008 | Norfolk, VA | Old Dominion | 2–1 |
| 36 | October 21, 2009 | Harrisonburg, VA | Old Dominion | 1–0 |
| 37 | October 27, 2010 | Norfolk, VA | James Madison | 2–0 |
| 38 | October 26, 2011 | Harrisonburg, VA | James Madison | 3–2 |
| 39 | October 3, 2012 | Norfolk, VA | Tie | 0–0 |
| 40 | September 25, 2022 | Norfolk, VA | Tie | 0–0 |
| 41 | October 18, 2023 | Harrisonburg, VA | James Madison | 3–1 |
| 42 | November 5, 2024 | Norfolk, VA | Old Dominion | 1–0 |
| 43 | October 31, 2025 | Harrisonburg, VA | Tie | 1–1 |
Series: James Madison leads 20–14–9

== See also ==
- List of NCAA college football rivalry games
