= HBCU Classic =

- Historically Black Colleges and Universities Classic
- Stadium: Sirrine Stadium
- Location: Greenville, South Carolina
- Operated: 2005–present

2008 matchup
- Concordia College vs. Livingstone College (21–26)

2009 matchup
- Savannah State vs. Livingstone (34–12)

The HBCU Classic is an annual American football game played in Greenville, South Carolina at Sirrine Stadium.

== History ==
The first HBCU Classic was held in 2005 in Greenville, South Carolina.

=== Game results ===
Date	Winner	Opponent	Score	Ref.
October 8, 2005	Edward Waters College	Clark Atlanta University	20–13	
August 26, 2006	Johnson C. Smith University	Edward Waters College	19–14	
November 3, 2007	Edward Waters College	Concordia College	24–21	
August 28, 2008	Concordia College	Livingstone College	21–26	
September 5, 2009	Savannah State University	Livingstone College	34–12	

== See also ==
- List of black college football classics
