= 2009 Savannah State Tigers football team =

American college football season

2009 Savannah State Tigers football
- Conference: Independent
- Record: 2–8
- Head coach: Robby Wells (2nd season)
- Offensive coordinator: Eddie Johnson (1st season)
- Offensive scheme: Multiple
- Defensive coordinator: Julius Dixon (2nd season)
- Base defense: Base 4–3
- Home stadium: Ted Wright Stadium

2009 NCAA Division I FCS independents football standings
	Conf.			Overall
Team	W		L	W		L
Old Dominion		–		9	–	2
North Carolina Central		–		4	–	7
Savannah State		–		2	–	8
Winston–Salem State		–		1	–	10

The 2009 Savannah State Tigers football team represented Savannah State University in American football. The Tigers were members of the NCAA Division I Football Championship Subdivision as an independent. This was the second season under the guidance of head coach Robby Wells.

The Tigers entered the 2009 season seeking its first winning season since joining Division I-AA in 2000, but ended the season with a 2–8 record. The team compiled a 5–7 record in 2008, the most wins since 1999, when the Tigers finished with a 5–6 as a member of the NCAA Division II. The Tigers last winning season was in 1998.

== Season summary ==
=== Preseason ===
- Former offensive coordinator and quarterback coach Alan Hall left the Savannah State staff to join the football program at Winston-Salem State University
- February 4, 2009 – Savannah State announced the signing of National Letters of Intent by 21 players.

Name	Position		School	City, State
Blair Austin	WR	6–2, 190	Brookwood HS	Thomasville, GA
Cedric Brown	OL	6–2, 275	Thomasville HS	Thomasville, GA
Tavarus Butler	DT	6–4, 270	Putnam County HS	Eatonton, GA
Jonathan Clowers	OL	6–6, 280	Perry HS	Perry, GA
Justin Cooper	CB	6–2, 185	Cartersville HS	Cartersville, GA
Kevin Davenport	WR	6–3, 210	Glenn Hills HS	Augusta, GA
Brian Forde	DT	6–4, 295	Newton County HS	Conyers, GA
Phillip Gaines	LB	5–10, 195	Gainesville HS	Gainesville, GA
Franklin Green	RB	5–10, 205	Jenkins HS	Savannah, GA
Kenneth James	OL	6–4, 306	Millcreek HS	Hoschton, GA
Antonio Martin	CB	5–9, 170	Jefferson HS	Jefferson, GA
Warren Mason	OL	6–5, 310	Cedar Grove HS	Atlanta, GA
Quenton Pooler	LB	6–2, 210	Newton County HS	Covington, GA
DaShawn Printup	S	6–1, 190	Calhoun HS	Calhoun, GA
Terrick Ransom	OL	6- 1, 300	Cedar Grove HS	Atlanta, GA
Ricky Rivera	WR	6–1, 170	Long County HS	Ludowici, GA
Dustin Russell	LB	6–1, 205	Newnan HS	Newnan, GA
Leland Russell	LB	5–9, 210	Newnan HS	Newnan, GA
Calvert Smith	DB	5- 10, 180	Memorial Day HS	Savannah, GA
Anthony Thomas	LB	6–1, 205	Dublin HS	Dublin, GA
Channing Welch	DL	6–3, 270	Furman Univ. / Fayette County HS	Atlanta, GA

- Spring practice was held between March 24, 2009, and April 16, 2009. The annual spring game was held on April 18, 2009. During the game, the Orange beat the Blue, 23–0.
- The game between Savannah State and North Greenville, originally scheduled for October 10 at Ted Wright Stadium in Savannah, was canceled because of a scheduling conflict.
- The Tigers announced the addition of CJ Frye (running backs coach) and Hans Batichon (wide receivers coach) on July 29, 2009. Frye replaced Trevin Smith who left the Tigers' staff, while Batichon replaced Eddie Johnson who was promoted to offensive coordinator / quarterbacks coach. Frye was the offensive coordinator at McCormick High School in McCormick, South Carolina last season and played offensive line at the University of South Carolina. Batichon, a graduate of Appalachian State University (where he played wide receiver), came to SSU from Watauga High School in Boone, North Carolina.
- Eighty-five players reported to campus on August 4, 2009, for Football Camp. The Tigers returned 56 lettermen, including 16 starters and 29 newcomers. The first practice was also held on August 5.
- Coach Wells announced on August 28 that senior wide receiver Deleon Hollinger, senior linebacker Antwan Allen, senior defensive lineman Brandon Miller and senior offensive lineman Derrick Dorsey were selected as team captains for the 2009 season.
- Barry Casterlin is hired as running backs coach to replace Curtis Frye who left SSU to become tight ends coach at Tennessee State University.

=== Regular season ===
- The Tigers win over Livingstone College on September 5 was the team's first season opening win in five years.
- The Tigers loss to McNeese State on September 19, was the team's worst loss since losing to Gardner-Webb University, 66–0, on November 3, 2007, and the first shutout loss for Coach Wells.
- Center Donnell Collins sustained a season-ending ankle injury in the Tigers' 47–10 loss to Charleston Southern on October 3, 2009.
- Former Savannah State player Shannon Sharpe's #2 jersey, was officially retired by the university and presented to Sharpe during the pre-game ceremony before the Bethune-Cookman University game on October 17.

== Schedule ==
Date	Time	Opponent	Site	Result	Attendance	Source
September 5	4:00 p.m.	vs. Livingstone*	Sirrine Stadium; Greenville, SC (HBCU Classic)	W 34–12	2,100	
September 12	5:00 p.m.	Alabama State*	Ted Wright Stadium; Savannah, GA (Joe Turner Classic)	L 17–20	5,947	
September 19	8:00 p.m.	at No. 8 McNeese State*	Cowboy Stadium; Lake Charles, LA	L 0–56	13,912	
September 26	4:00 p.m.	vs. Concordia (AL)*	Lucy Laney High School Stadium; Augusta, GA (Southern Georgia Heritage Classic)	L 21–23	1,333	
October 3	1:30 p.m.	at Charleston Southern*	Buccaneer Field; Charleston, SC	L 10–47	3,023	
October 17	5:00 p.m.	Bethune–Cookman*	Ted Wright Stadium; Savannah, GA	L 24–34	3,517	
October 24	5:00 p.m.	Old Dominion*	Ted Wright Stadium; Savannah, GA	L 17–38	2,743	
October 31	2:00 p.m.	Edward Waters*^{†}	Ted Wright Stadium; Savannah, GA	W 45–24	11,643	
November 14	5:00 p.m.	Webber International*	Ted Wright Stadium; Savannah, GA	L 20–35	1,956	
November 21	1:30 p.m.	at North Carolina Central*	O'Kelly-Riddick Stadium; Durham, NC	L 14–35	4,765	
*Non-conference game; ^{†}Homecoming; Rankings from The Sports Network Poll released prior to the game; All times are in Eastern time

== Coaches and support staff ==
Name	Type	College	Graduating year
Robert "Robby" Wells	Head coach	Furman	1990
John W. Montgomery, II	Asst. head coach Offensive line coach	Oklahoma State	1976
Eddie Johnson	Offensive coordinator Quarterbacks coach	Georgetown College	1993
Julius Dixon	Defensive coordinator Defensive backs coach	Furman	1990
Allen Edwards	Defensive line coach Recruiting coordinator	Furman	1993
Jose Gonzalez	Inside linebackers coach	Southern Mississippi	2000
Barry Casterlin	Running backs coach	South Carolina	2001
Hans Batichon	Wide receivers coach	Appalachian State	2008
Melanie Dalpias	Graduate Assistant / Athletic Trainer	Graceland	2007
Renee Mickey	Graduate Assistant / Athletic Trainer	UNC-Pembroke	2009

== Roster ==
2009 Savannah State Tigers by position
Quarterbacks: 1 Kurvin Curry – Sophomore; 13 Antonio Bostic – Freshman; 14 A.J. Defilippis – Freshman; Running backs: 20 Justin Babb – Junior; 21 Rashard Russell – Freshman; 29 Rashad Curry – Junior; 31 Tim Williams – Sophomore; 34 Daniel Heslop – Freshman; 47 Jared Pollard – Freshman; Wide receivers: 4 Deron Talley – Sophomore; 5 Ricky Rivera – Freshman; 6 Byron Leggett – Junior; 9 Deleon Hollinger – Senior; 16 Zach Mayfield – Freshman; 19 Javares Taylor – Senior; 24 Antonio Proctor – Freshman; 80 B.J. Longley – Sophomore; 81 Armond Denson – Junior; 82 Stefon Taylor – Junior; 83 Nathan Robinson – Sophomore; 84 Alakan Thomas – Sophomore; 85 Demetrius Holmes – Freshman (redshirt); Tight ends: 17 Steven Veasy – Senior; Kickers / punters: 89 Vance Tarver – Freshman; 99 Derek Williams – Sophomore	Fullbacks: 48 Michael Johnson – Sophomore; Offensive line: 59 Derrick Dorsey – Senior; 60 Josh Davis – Freshman; 61 Brian Lamarr – Freshman; 62 Jared Brunson – Sophomore; 68 Thelmore Jackson – Sophomore; 69 Keith Turner – Freshman; 70 Demetrius Edwards – Junior; 71 Lenworth McKenzie – Sophomore; 73 Cedric Brown – Freshman; 74 Jonathan Clowers – Freshman; 75 Warren Mason – Freshman; 76 Dan Johnson – Junior; 77 Donnell Collins – Sophomore; 78 Terrick Ransom – Freshman (redshirt); 79 Jerome Miller – Freshman; Defensive line: 40 Cordero Campbell – Junior; 42 Juvaro Goodman – Sophomore; 50 LaDarien Redfield – Junior; 57 Johnny Howard – Sophomore; 86 James Briscoe – Sophomore; 90 Travis Alston – Sophomore; 91 Chris Reed – Senior; 92 Stephen Myers – Freshman (redshirt); 93 Brandon Miller – Senior; 94 Channing Welch – Junior; 95 Tavarus Butler – Freshman; 96 Tim Wright – Freshman; 97 Tametric Hunt – Sophomore	Linebackers: 12 Leland Russell – Freshman; 26 Antwan Allen – Senior; 32 Anthony Thomas – Freshman; 35 Sadrak JeanBaptiste – Sophomore; 43 Jeffrey Robertson – Junior; 44 Phillip Gaines – Freshman; 45 J. Vince Cochran – Junior; 46 Henry Jackson – Sophomore; 49 Michael Kuku – Sophomore; 52 Edwin Stevenson – Sophomore; 53 Nate Clay – Sophomore; 54 Coy Allen – Freshman; 55 Xavier Lewis – Sophomore; Defensive backs: 3 Cedric Chambers – Freshman; 7 Darren Hunter – Junior; 8 Patrick Thomas – Sophomore; 10 Justin Cooper – Freshman; 11 Antonio Martin – Freshman; 15 Deshawn Printup – Freshman; 18 CJ Smith – Freshman; 22 Richie Rucker – Sophomore; 25 Edward Ndem – Junior; 27 Mathew Smith – Sophomore; 28 Jevontae Jefferson – Freshman; 30 Chris Asbury – Sophomore; 33 Khelvin Sullivan – Freshman; 37 Toriano Holt – Freshman; 38 Brent McCall – Sophomore; 39 Mickolas Dudley – Sophomore; 41 Emory Williams – Senior; 72 Michael Mitchell – Freshman

== Game summaries ==
=== Livingstone ===
	1	2	3	4	Total
Savannah State	15	10	0	9	34
Livingstone	0	0	0	12	12

HBCU Classic

Justin Babb rushed for 229 yards, including an 81-yard touchdown as the Tigers defeated Division II Livingstone College, 34–12, in the fifth annual HBCU Classic. A crowd of 2,100 fans saw the Tigers take a 25–0 lead in the first half.

The Blue Bears (0–2) had just 28 rushing yards on 26 carries in the game while the Tigers had 391 rushing yards on 49 carries. The Tigers gained 483 yards of offense while the defense sacked the Livingstone quarterback six times. The win gives Savannah State a 7–1 lead in the all-time series against Livingstone.

=== Alabama State ===
	1	2	3	4	Total
Alabama State	0	13	0	7	20
Savannah State	7	10	0	0	17

Joe Turner Classic

Sophomore kicker Dereck Williams missed two field goals (36 and 42 yards) late in the fourth quarter as the Alabama State Hornets held on to defeat Savannah State, 20–17, at T.A. Wright Stadium. Quarterback Kurvin Curry completed 13 of 20 passes (159 yards) and Justin Babb rushed for 78 yards on 18 carries. The Tigers lead for much of the game, but fell behind when Devin Dominguez caught a 20-yard pass from Chris Mitchell late in the fourth quarter.

=== McNeese State ===
	1	2	3	4	Total
Savannah State	0	0	0	0	0
#8 McNeese State	28	14	14	0	56

The eighth ranked Cowboys of McNeese State University racked up 489 yards on offense, including a season-high 288 rushing yards, in a 56–0 rout of Savannah State in the first ever meeting between the two schools. The Tigers offense were held to nine first downs during the game and only crossed mid-field three times. The McNeese State defense scored twice including a score on the game's fourth play when the Cowboys' defense sacked SSU quarterback Kurvin Curry and Desmund Lighten recovered his fumble in the end zone. Freshman quarterback A.J. DeFilippis replaced an injured Curry in the first half and completed 9 of 12 passes for 65 yards and one interception in the game. Junior defensive back Edward Ndem led the Tigers' defense with eight tackles while Chris Reed and Jeff Robertson had seven tackles each.

=== Concordia (AL) ===
	1	2	3	4	Total
Savannah State	7	7	0	7	21
Concordia	7	7	0	9	23

Concordia's Harrison Ellison kicked a 35-yard field goal as time expired to give Concordia a 23–21 win over the Tigers in the 2009 Southern Georgia Heritage Classic in front of 1,333 in attendance. Savannah State led 21–14 with just over nine minutes left in the fourth quarter, but the Hornets, an NAIA-level team, scored nine points in the final five minutes, fourteen seconds to earn the win.

SSU gained 259 yards of total offense compared to Concordia's 376 yards. SSU quarterback A.J. DeFilippis came off the bench and was 9-of-11 passing for 95 yards with two touchdowns, ran five times for 41 yards, and threw an interception. Starting quarterback Kurvin Curry was 5-of-10, passing for 61 yards but was sacked twice. Justin Babb ran for a game-high 74 yards and a touchdown.

=== Charleston Southern ===
	1	2	3	4	Total
Savannah State	0	7	0	3	10
Charleston Southern	14	19	7	7	47

Charleston Southern piled up 528 total yards in a 47–10 win over Savannah State. The Tigers only touchdown was a 16-yard run by Justin Babb. Babb finished the game with seven carries for 81 yards. Senior wide receiver Deleon Hollinger surpassed the 100-catch mark in his career in the game. Starting quarterback A.J. Defilippis completed 12 of 28 passes for 124 yards, but threw 2 interceptions. Kurvin Curry completed 4 of 7 passes during the game. The Tigers mustered 266 yards of total offense. The Tigers defense was led by Chris Asbury who achieved a career-high 11 tackles in the game. The Tigers fell to 1–4 on the season and Charleston Southern improved to 2–3.

=== Bethune–Cookman ===
	1	2	3	4	Total
Bethune–Cookman	14	0	0	20	34
Savannah State	0	7	10	7	24

The Bethune-Cookman Wildcats stopped Savannah State's Kurvin Curry on fourth-and-goal run from the 1-yard line late in the fourth quarter to preserve a 34–24 win. With 4:19 remaining in the game and trailing 27–24, the Tigers went on offense at the Wildcats' 8-yard line when linebacker Michael Kuku forced B-CU quarterback Matthew Johnson to fumble the football and defensive end Chris Reed recovered the ball. The Tigers offense attempted four plays, including two from inside B-CU's 1-yard line, but were unable to score. The Tigers were able to get the ball back at their own 34 yard line with 1:56 remaining in the game, but Curry's pass was intercepted by Michael Williams and returned 52 yards for a touchdown with 42 seconds left. Curry was intercepted again with 40 seconds left in the game by Tavaris Bell on the Tigers final offensive play of the game.

Curry, who relieved starter A.J. Defilippis in the game, was 11 of 23 for 174 yards with one touchdown and two interceptions. Defilippis was 4 of 11 for 49 yards. Savannah State moved to 1–5 and the Wildcats improved to 2–4.

=== Old Dominion ===
	1	2	3	4	Total
Old Dominion	7	10	14	7	38
Savannah State	0	0	10	7	17

Savannah State's losing streak was extended to six games after a 38–17 loss to Old Dominion. The loss assures the Tigers of a losing season, the eleventh consecutive, while ODU, who is in their first year of football, improves to 6–2.

Sophomore quarterback Kurvin Curry accounted for 235 of total offense (passed for 185 yards and ran for 50 yards) and two touchdowns. Deleon Hollinger ended the game with 10 receptions for 70 yards. Antwan Allen led the SSU defense with 10 tackles. Late in the third quarter, Derek Williams hit a career-long 46-yard field goal to cut SSU's deficit to 31–10.

ODU quarterback Thomas DeMarco finished the game with 198 yards (14-of-20 passing) and three touchdowns without an interception.

=== Edward Waters ===
	1	2	3	4	Total
Edward Waters	12	0	12	0	24
Savannah State	7	7	21	10	45

Homecoming

The Tigers ended a 6-game losing streak with a 45–24 Homecoming victory over Edward Waters College at Ted Wright Stadium. The SSU Tigers held a 14–12 lead at halftime and Edward Waters cut the score to 21–18 early in the third quarter, but the SSU eventually pulled away outscoring Edward Waters, 31–12 in the second half. Running back Justin Babb ran 13 times for 167 yards and scored four touchdowns. Babb also caught three passes for a team-high 89 yards. Sophomore quarterback Kurvin Curry was 13-of-26 passing for 234 yards and threw two touchdowns and one interception. He was sacked three times, but ran 21 times for 64 yards, including a 10-yard touchdown.

Savannah State's had 485 total yards of offense while Edward Waters had 358 yards. The loss dropped Edward Waters to 0–9 on the season.

=== Webber International ===
	1	2	3	4	Total
Webber International	7	14	7	7	35
Savannah State	7	6	0	7	20

NAIA Webber International finished its season by winning four of its last five games including a 35–20 victory against the Tigers. The Warriors took a 14–10 lead over the Tigers in the second quarter and never trailed again.

The Tigers had 227 yards of total offense in the game. Quarterback Kurvin Curry was 18-of-35 passing for 171 yards and threw two touchdowns, but was intercepted twice. Senior wide receiver Deleon Hollinger had a team-high six catches for 47 yards and one touchdown. Kicker Derek Williams kicked field goals of 42 and 29 yards in the game and made both of his extra-point attempts.

During the game SSU defensive lineman Channing Welch left the game with an injury that required him to be placed on a backboard and taken by ambulance to a hospital.

The loss was the Tigers third to a lower-division team under second-year coach Robby Wells.

=== North Carolina Central ===
	1	2	3	4	Total
Savannah State	7	0	7	0	14
NC Central	7	7	7	14	35

The Tigers had 173 passing yards and 173 rushing yards, but fell to North Carolina Central 35–14.

The Tigers finished the 2009 football season at 2–8.

== Awards and records ==
=== Awards ===
- Senior wide receiver Deleon Hollinger was listed as an honorable mention on the 2009 All-HBCU Football Team presented by Consensus Draft Services.
- Kurvin Curry and Derek Williams were named to the Phil Steele College Football Preview's 2009 pre-season All-Independent Team. Curry was named as quarterback of the First Team Offense while Williams was named as a punter and placekicker for the First Team Special Team.

== Statistics ==
Current as of November 24, 2009 – All Games

=== Team ===
	Team	Opp
Scoring	202	324
Points per game	20.2	32.4
First downs	172	191
Rushing	83	81
Passing	71	100
Penalty	18	10
Total offense	3,149	3839
Avg per play	4.8	5.9
Avg per game	314.9	383.9
Fumbles-Lost	13–3	21–13
Penalties-Yards	70–569	80–702
Avg per game	56.9	70.2

	Team	Opp
Punts-Yards	58–2,156	43–1,617
Avg per punt	37.2	37.6
Time of possession/Game	28:52	30:56
3rd down conversions	60 of 150 (40%)	47 of 130 (36%)
4th down conversions	2 of 16 (12%)	13 of 23 (57%)
Touchdowns scored	25	45
Field goals-Attempts-Long	9–14	6–9
PAT-Attempts	23–23 (100%)	36–42 (86%)
Attendance	25,806	23,800
Games / Avg per Game	5 / 5,161	4 / 5,950

==== Scores by quarter ====
	1	2	3	4	Total
Savannah State	50	54	48	50	202
Opponents	96	84	67	77	324

=== Individual offense ===
==== Rushing ====
Name	GP	Att	Gain	Loss	Net	Avg	TD	Long	Avg/G
Babb, Justin	10	129	839	35	804	6.2	6	81	80.4
Beaurem, Thomas	8	3	15	0	15	5.0	0	6	1.9
Collins, Donnell	4	3	0	31	-31	-10.3	0	0	-7.8
Curry, Kurvin	10	146	559	223	336	2.3	6	30	33.6
Depilippis, A.J.	7	22	81	22	59	2.7	0	25	8.4
Heslop, Daniel	9	32	177	6	171	5.3	1	32	19.0
Hollinger, Deleon	10	2	11	0	11	5.5	0	9	1.1
Jeanbaptiste, S.	10	2	0	3	-3	-3.0	0	0	-3.0
Johnson, Dan	3	1	0	3	-3	-3.0	0	0	-1.0
Johnson, Michael	1	1	0	0	0	0	0	0	0
Russell, Rashard	5	11	87	0	87	7.9	0	21	17.4
Taylor, Javares	9	13	34	47	-13	-1.0	0	8	-1.4
Taylor, Stefon	5	2	13	0	13	6.5	0	11	2.6
Total	10	366	1,816	370	1,446	4.0	13	81	144.6
Opponents	10	367	1,853	325	1,528	4.2	13	80	152.8

==== Passing ====
Name	GP	Effic	Att-Cmp-Int	Pct	Yds	TD	Lng	Avg/G
Curry, Kurvin	10	115.4	110–202–7	54.5	1,278	9	52	127.8
Defilippis, A.J.	7	99.5	46–82–5	56.1	425	3	32	60.7
Total	10	110.8	156–284–12	54.9	1,703	12	52	170.3
Opponents	10	160.6	176–281–4	62.6	2,311	27	69	231.1

==== Receiving ====
Name	GP	No.	Yds	Avg	TD	Long	Avg/G
Babb, Justin	10	24	231	9.6	3	52	23.1
Heslop, Daniel	9	3	27	9.0	1	13	3.0
Hollinger, Deleon	10	51	509	10.0	4	40	50.9
Holmes, D.	1	1	5	5.0	0	5	5
McMullen, Chris	1	1	5	5.0	0	5	5.0
Taylor, Javares	9	27	214	7.9	0	26	23.8
Leggett, Byron	9	20	350	17.5	1	32	38.9
Talley, Deron	8	18	256	14.2	2	47	32.0
Taylor, Stefon	5	6	46	7.7	1	21	9.2
Rivera, Ricky	4	5	66	13.2	0	26	16.5
Total	10	156	1,703	10.9	12	52	170.3
Opponents	10	176	2,311	13.1	27	69	231.1

=== Defense ===
Name	GP	Tackles				Sacks	Pass defense			Fumbles		Blkd Kick	Saf
Name	GP	Solo	Ast	Total	TFL-Yds	No-Yds	INT-Yds	BrUp	QBH	Rcv-Yds	FF	Blkd Kick	Saf
Allen, Antwan	10	34	45	79	3.0–8	-	1–21	6	1	-	1	-	-
Allen, Coy	4	4	1	5	-	-	-	-	-	-	-	-	-
Alston, Travis	7	7	7	14	3.0–6	0.5–3	-	-	-	-	3	-	-
Asbury, Chris	10	32	22	54	1.5–8	-	-	-	-	-	-	-	-
Babb, Justin	10	-	1	1	-	-	-	-	-	-	-	-	-
Briscoe, James	6	3	4	7	0.5–2	-	-	-	-	-	-	-	-
Chambers, Cedric	3	1	2	3	-	-	-	-	-	-	-	-	-
Clay, Nate	1	1	-	1	-	-	-	-	-	-	-	-	-
Cochran, Vince	9	28	23	51	7.5–23	-	-	1	-	1–0	-	-	-
Cooper, Justin	8	14	10	24	-	-	1–19	5	-	-	-	-	-
Curry, Kurvin	10	1	-	1	-	-	-	-	-	-	-	-	-
Edwards, D.	5	1	-	1	-	-	-	-	-	-	-	-	-
Gaines, Phillip	4	2	4	6	0.5–0	-	-	-	-	-	-	-	-
Goodman, Juvaro	8	7	3	10	1.0–2	-	-	-	-	-	-	1	-
Hollinger, D.	10	1	-	1	-	-	-	-	-	-	-	-	-
Holt, Toriano	1	-	1	1	-	-	-	-	-	-	-	-	-
Howard, Johnny	8	7	13	20	3.0–8	0.5–3	-	-	-	1–0	-	-	-
Hunt, Tametric	10	8	11	19	4.0–11	1.5–2	-	1	-	-	-	-	-
Hunter, Darren	7	15	4	19	-	-	1–3	3	-	-	-	-	-
JeanBaptiste, S	10	27	23	50	7.0–25	2.5–11	-	-	-	-	-	1	1
Jefferson, J.	8	18	15	33	-	-	-	4	-	-	1	-	-
Kuku, Michaek	8	13	15	28	3.5–9	-	-	1	-	1–0	1	-	-
Leggett, Byron	9	1	-	1	-	-	-	-	-	-	-	-	-
McCall, Brent	4	2	2	4	-	-	-	-	-	-	-	-	-
Miller, Brandon	2	2	-	2	1.0–3	-	-	-	-	-	-	-	-
Myers, Stephan	2	1	2	3	1.0–1	-	-	-	-	-	-	-	-
Ndem, Edward	9	32	24	56	1.5–4	-	1–19	6	7	-	1	1	-
Printup, Deshawn	1	-	1	1	-	-	-	-	-	-	-	-	-
Redfield, L.	10	27	23	50	7.0–25	2.5–11	-	-	-	-	-	1	-
Reed, Chris	10	25	25	50	11.5–62	6.5–43	-	2	2	2–0	2	2	-
Robertson, J.	9	10	14	24	2.0–13	-	-	-	-	2–0	-	-	-
Rucker, Richie	7	9	4	13	-	-	-	1	-	1–0	-	-	-
Russell, Rashard	5	-	-	-	-	-	-	-	-	-	-	1	-
Smith, Matthew	5	7	5	12	-	-	-	2	-	-	-	-	-
Talley, Deron	8	1	-	1	-	-	-	-	-	-	-	-	-
TEAM	3	-	-	-	-	-	-	-	-	1–0	-	-	1
Thomas, Anthony	10	10	17	27	1.0–3	-	-	1	-	1–0	-	-	-
Thomas, Patrick	3	2	2	4	-	-	-	2	-	-	-	-	-
Welch, Channing	8	14	13	27	9.0–40	2.5–13	-	1	-	-	-	-	-
Williams, Derek	10	3	1	4	-	-	-	-	-	-	-	-	-
Williams, Emery	1	1	-	1	-	-	-	-	-	-	-	-	-
Total	10	365	334	699	71–268	18–85	4–62	36	6	13–0	12	6	1
Opponents	10	361	326	687	65–291	25–181	12–331	26	38	3–0	2	1	-

=== Special teams ===
Name	Punting								Kickoffs				
Name	No.	Yds	Avg	Long	TB	FC	I20	Blkd	No.	Yds	Avg	TB	OB
Defilippis, A.J.	1	48	48.0	48	1	0	0	0	3	152	50.7	0	0
Tarver, Vance	2	68	34.0	38	0	0	0	0	3	172	57.3	0	0
TEAM	1	0	0.0	0	0	0	0	0	0	0	0	0	0
Williams, Derek	54	2,040	37.8	58	5	5	12	1	40	2,170	54.2	0	0
Total	58	2,156	37.2	58	6	5	12	1	43	2,342	54.5	0	0
Opponents	43	1,617	37.6	64	2	0	7	2	62	3,647	58.8	7	3

Name	Punt returns					Kick returns				
Name	No.	Yds	Avg	TD	Long	No.	Yds	Avg	TD	Long
Allen, Antwan	0	0	0.0	0	0	1	26	26.0	0	26
Beaurem, Thomas	0	0	0.0	0	0	19	332	17.5	0	38
Campbell, C.	0	0	0.0	0	0	2	71	35.5	0	43
Heslop, Daniel	0	0	0.0	0	0	1	9	9.0	0	9
Hollinger, D.	12	191	15.9	0	38					
Hunter, Darren	1	0	0.0	0	0	0	0	0	0	0
JeanBaptiste, S.	1	6	6.0	0	0	0	0	0.0	0	0
Jefferson, J.	0	0	0.0	0	0	11	254	23.1	0	48
Proctor, Antonio	0	0	0.0	0	0	11	196	17.8	0	23
Rivera, Ricky	2	39	19.5	0	21	0	0	0	0	0
Russell, Rashard	1	18	18.0	0	0	6	130	21.7	0	36
Veasy, Steven	0	0	0.0	0	0	1	0	0.0	0	0
Total	17	254	14.9	0	38	52	1,018	19.6	0	48
Opponents	26	159	6.1	0	39	40	884	22.1	0	56
