= Old Dominion Monarchs football =

College football team

Old Dominion Monarchs
2026 Old Dominion Monarchs football team
- First season: 1930; 96 years ago (Note: The team played until 1940 before folding. It was restarted in 2009; 17 years ago.)
- Head coach: Ricky Rahne; 6th season, 30–33 (.476)
- Location: Norfolk, Virginia
- Stadium: S.B. Ballard Stadium (capacity: 21,944)
- Field: Kornblau Field
- NCAA division: Division I FBS
- Conference: Sun Belt
- Division: East
- Nickname: Monarchs
- Colors: Slate blue, silver, and light blue
- All-time record: 107–89–0 (Note: The NCAA does not recognize the 1930–1940 seasons.) (.546)
- Bowl record: 2–2 (.500)

Division championships
- C-USA East: 2016
- Rivalries: James Madison (rivalry); Norfolk State (rivalry); William & Mary (rivalry)
- Fight song: Victory for Old Dominion!
- Mascot: Big Blue
- Marching band: Monarch Marching Band
- Outfitter: Under Armour
- Website: odusports.com

The Old Dominion Monarchs football program represents Old Dominion University in U.S. college football. The first iteration of the team created in 1930 was known as the William & Mary Norfolk Division Braves. Founded in 2009, the current Monarchs team competed as an FCS independent for their first two seasons. In the 2011 season, they joined the Colonial Athletic Association and added conference games to their schedule, playing there until joining Conference USA of the FBS in 2014. They joined the Sun Belt Conference in 2022.

== History ==
=== Early history: Tommy Scott era (1930–1940) ===
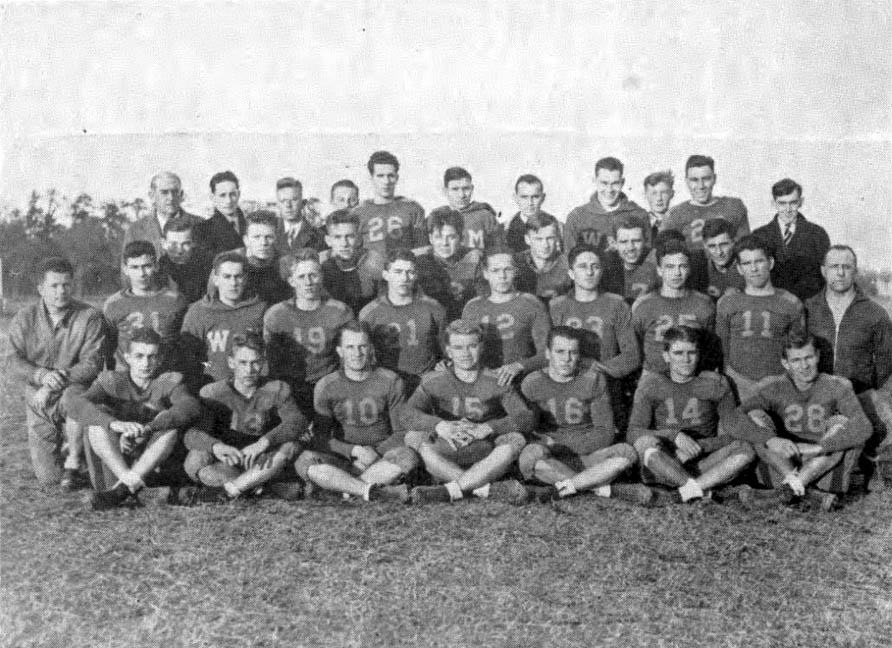
Old Dominion 1936 football team

According to sports historian Peter Stewart, in September 1930 a reporter asked Coach Tommy Scott whether the Norfolk Division of the College of William & Mary should have a football team. Scott answered that he had not thought of having one, but within two days a team was "put together hurriedly" and began playing other small colleges. In late December 1932, the team played the University of Miami Hurricanes in Miami, after the four-year college sent an invitation to William & Mary which the two-year Norfolk Division accidentally received. The college played football for 11 seasons (1930–1940), with a record of 42–36–4. The program was discontinued due to a rule against freshman players, a $10,000 debt, and accreditation issues. The team lost every game in its last season, attendance was small, and Stewart believes that World War II would likely have forced the program to end regardless of other reasons.

=== Bobby Wilder era (2007–2019) ===
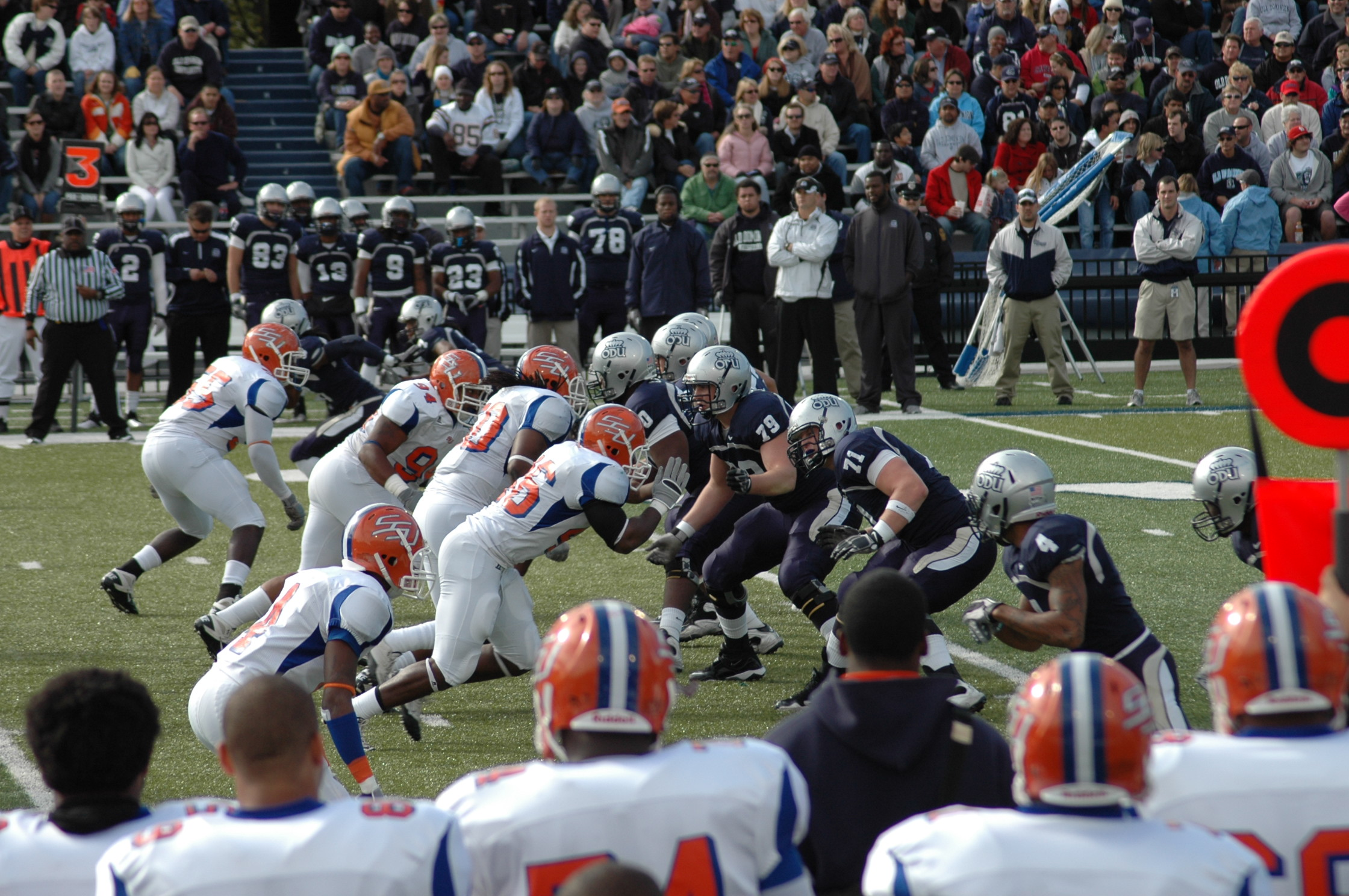
Old Dominion vs. Savannah State in 2010 at Foreman Field

According to Senior Associate Athletic Director Debbie White, ODU had tried several times to restart a football team. The university wanted to improve ties to alumni, who often stated in exit interviews before graduation their wish for an ODU football team, and rarely revisited the campus. On June 14, 2005, the Board of Visitors unanimously approved with a 14–0 vote to create a new football team to compete, along with the university's other sports teams, at the NCAA Division I level. The new football team were to begin play in 2009. On February 9, 2007, Athletic Director Jim Jarrett announced that Bobby Wilder, then the associate head football coach at the University of Maine, would be the head coach and the team signed its first recruiting class in 2008. As is the case with many new football programs, all players in 2008 were redshirted. These players, along with the recruiting class of 2009 and transfer players, comprised the initial 2009 roster.

Old Dominion began play in 2009 as an independent team at the Division I FCS level (formerly I-AA), and joined the Colonial Athletic Association (CAA) for the 2011 season. In their first competitive season in 68 years, the Monarchs finished the season with a 9–2 record. That was the best winning record ever for a first-year program in college football's modern era. The Monarchs were outscored by a total of only eight points in their two losses. Wilder's inaugural team finished the year ranked in the top ten in five FCS statistical categories, including second in sacks allowed, third in scoring offense, turnover margin and net punting. The 2009 Monarchs were ninth in rushing offense.

ODU was fifth in FCS attendance in 2009, selling out all of their home games in the 19,782-seat Foreman Field. Season tickets for the Monarchs' inaugural season sold out quickly and the school had to refund 1,065 orders. Foreman Field, formerly the ODU field hockey and women's lacrosse teams' home venue, was renovated to accommodate the new football program. Field hockey and women's lacrosse were relocated to the Powhatan Sports Complex.

In its first three years of competition after its rebirth, Old Dominion compiled a 26–7 record and earned a berth in the 2011 FCS playoffs, hosting and defeating its crosstown rival Norfolk State. Also in 2011, after playing 27 games in its "modern era", ODU received its first Top 25 ranking on October 3, coming in at No. 21 in The Sports Network poll. The Monarchs were ranked among the Top Ten after competing in 33 games.

==== CAA years: 2011–2012 ====
In 2011, ODU completed their first season in the CAA with a 9–2 record and a second-place finish in the conference. Most media had picked ODU to finish near the bottom of the conference. However, ODU outperformed those predictions and ultimately hosted a first round FCS playoff game. On 26 November 2011 the ODU Monarchs beat their crosstown rivals, the Norfolk State Spartans, 35–18 to advance to the second round of the 2011 FCS playoffs. ODU then traveled to Georgia to play the Georgia Southern Eagles in the second round of the playoffs, where they lost 55–48. Following the season, the Monarchs finished 10th in the final poll.

In April 2012, several reports linked ODU to possible realignment in FBS conferences Big East and Conference USA (C-USA) with possible conference play that begin as soon as 2013. The Big East reports were silenced with the addition of schools University of Houston, University of Central Florida, Southern Methodist University, and University of Memphis. However, the C-USA was still interested in ODU after adding five new schools including University of North Carolina at Charlotte, Florida International, University of North Texas, Louisiana Tech, and Texas-San Antonio.

In May 2012, it was officially announced that ODU would join C-USA for all sports effective July 1, 2013.

Despite being voted ineligible for the conference automatic bid and conference title, the Monarchs finished atop the CAA with a 7–1 in conference record. By finishing the regular season 10–1, the Monarchs won an at large bid into the 2012 NCAA Division I FCS Playoffs. The Monarchs lost to Georgia Southern 49–35 in the quarterfinals of the playoffs after the Eagles mounted a comeback by out-scoring the Monarchs 28–0 in the fourth quarter. During the loss to Georgia Southern, sophomore quarterback Taylor Heinicke passed Steve McNair for the most passing yards in a single season by an FCS quarterback with 5,076 yards. He also became the first quarterback to eclipse the 5,000 yard mark in a season as well as setting the record for most completions in a season with 398.

==== Move to FBS ====
ODU began its transition to the NCAA Division I Football Bowl Subdivision (FBS) at the conclusion of the 2012 season. The Monarchs spent 2013 as an FCS independent team. Originally, the 2014 season was to be spent as an FBS independent before being fully accepted into the C-USA with both bowl and championship eligibility. After a vote by the C-USA, it was changed so that the program would be eligible in 2014 for the conference title and a bowl berth.

The Monarchs won the final 3 games of the 2014 season to finished the season 6–6 and tied for 3rd in the east division of C-USA. 2014 was also Heinicke's final year at ODU.

In 2015 ODU football team competed fully bowl eligible. On September 19, 2015, North Carolina State played at Foreman Field. It was the first ACC and Power 5 school to play Old Dominion in Norfolk.

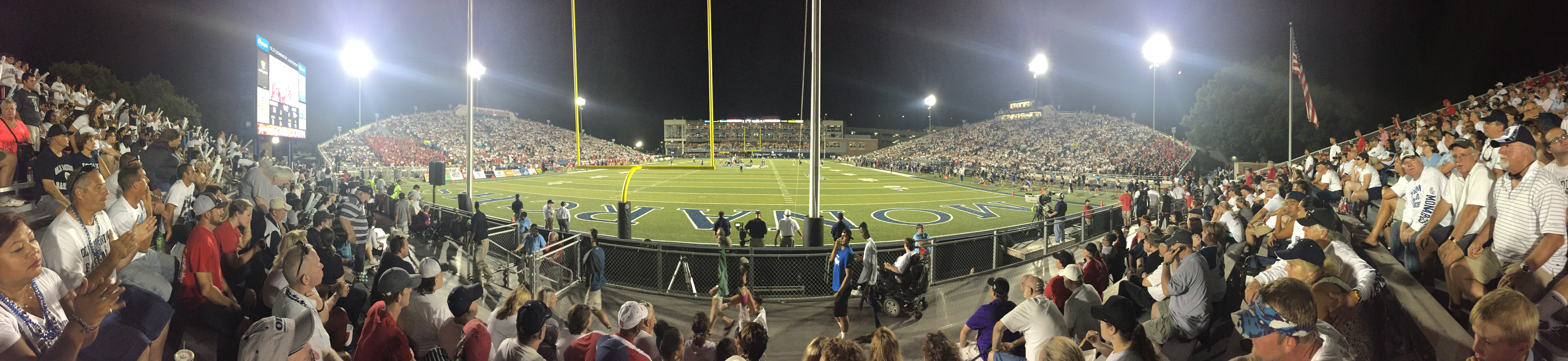
2015 Old Dominion vs NC State football game

Prior to the 2016 season, Old Dominion announced that it would redevelop Foreman Field in two phases: Phase I would increase the capacity from 20,118 to 22,130 after rebuilding the east and west grandstands between the 2018 and 2019 seasons. Phase II would increase the capacity from 22,130 to 30,004. A timeline for Phase II has not been announced.

After a 10–3 season in 2016 (7–1 in C-USA play), Old Dominion made it to their first bowl berth, defeating Eastern Michigan in the 2016 Bahamas Bowl.

On September 22, 2018, Old Dominion shocked then No. 13 Virginia Tech by defeating them 49–35 at home in front of a record crowd of 20,532. This game marked the first Monarch victory over both a Power 5 and ranked opponent. On November 17, 2018, the Monarchs played their last game at the 82 year-old Foreman Field. The field was demolished for renovation after the game and was subsequently renamed Komblau Field at S.B. Ballard Stadium. The stadium is also known as "The Castle" to fans.

On April 26, 2019, Oshane Ximines became the first Old Dominion player selected in the NFL Draft. He was drafted by the New York Giants in the third round with the 95th overall pick in the 2019 NFL draft.

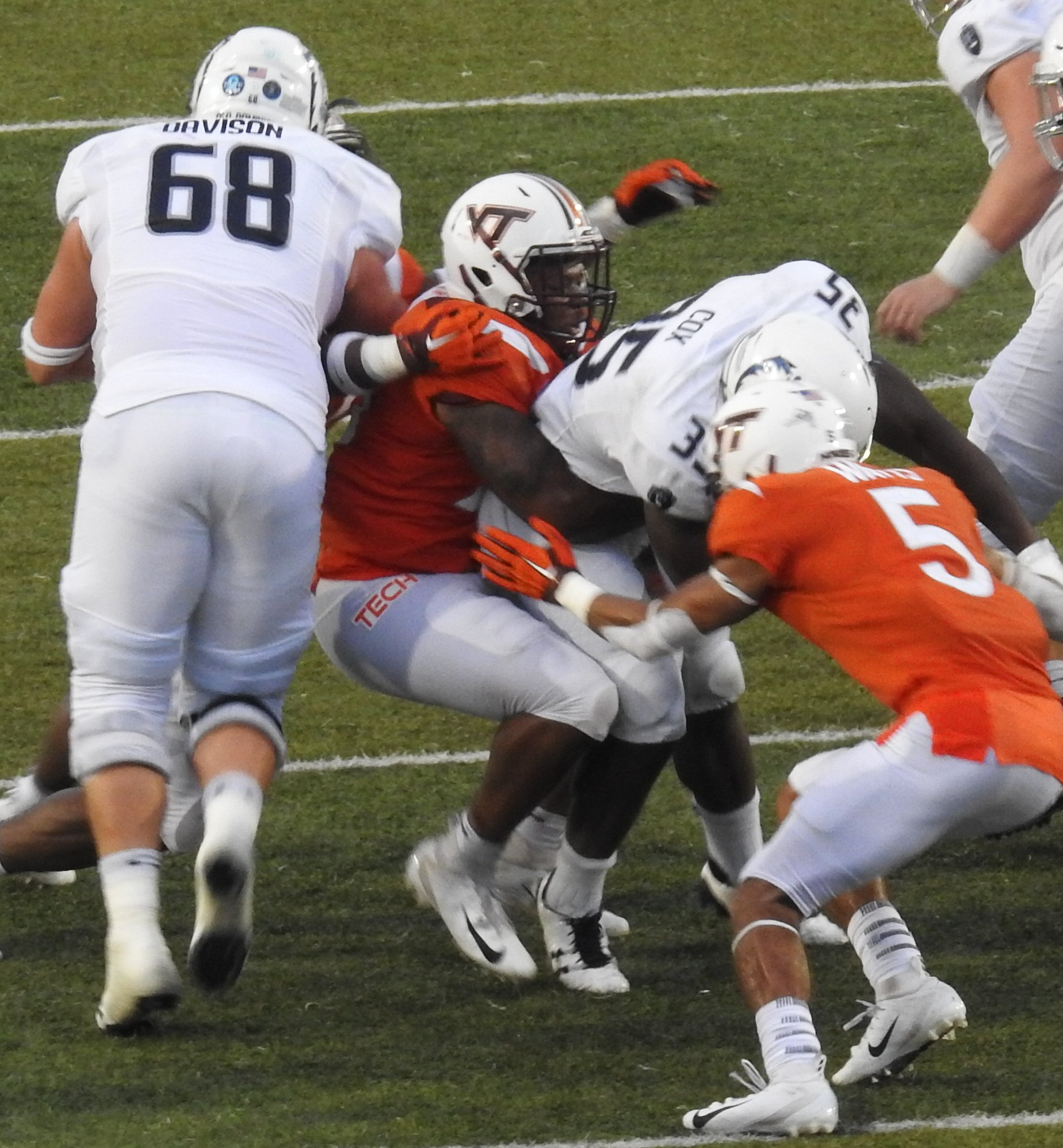
On September 22, 2018, ODU defeated Virginia Tech 49–35. Jeremy Cox (pictured, No. 35) rushed for 130 yards, including a 40-yard run that sealed the win late in the fourth quarter.

On December 2, 2019, Wilder resigned as the head coach of Old Dominion.

=== Ricky Rahne era (2020–present) ===
Ricky Rahne, former Penn State offensive coordinator, was announced as the next head coach on December 10, 2019. Amid the COVID-19 pandemic, the university announced that the 2020 football season for the Monarchs was canceled due to concerns about the safety of athletes and coaches.

Rahne coached his first full season in 2021. After a 1–6 start ODU went on a 5 game winning streak to end the regular season 6–6; while becoming Bowl eligible for the second time in program history. ODU played in the Myrtle Beach Bowl, but lost to Tulsa.

The 2022 season had some big changes. As the Monarchs across all sports moved into the Sun Belt Conference in July of that year, leaving C-USA (along with Southern Miss and Marshall). The 2022 season got off to a rough start when offensive coordinator Dave Patenaude resigned just two weeks before the season opener. Despite his departure ODU would start with an upset win over Virginia Tech by a final score 20–17. The Monarchs would go on to have a disappointing season, finishing 3–9.

The 2023 season showed improvement, as the Monarchs finished the regular season 6–6 and earned a berth in the Famous Toastery Bowl, where they lost to Western Kentucky to close the year at 6–7.

In 2024, Old Dominion went 5–7 in the regular season, with a three game losing streak late in the season effectively ending their bowl eligibility for the year.

The 2025 season began with a milestone victory, as ODU defeated Virginia Tech 45–26 in Blacksburg, the Monarchs’ first road win over a Power Four opponent.

== Conference affiliations ==
- Independent (1930–1940)
- NCAA Division I FCS independent (2009–2010, 2013)
- Colonial Athletic Association (2011–2012)
- Conference USA (2014–2022)
- Sun Belt Conference (2022–present)

== Postseason ==
=== Division championships ===
ODU competes in the East Division of C-USA since joining the conference in 2014. The Monarchs shared its first division title with Western Kentucky in 2016 but did not represent the East Division in the C-USA Championship Game due to a head-to-head loss to Western Kentucky.

Season	Division	Coach	Opponent	CG result
2016†	C-USA East	Bobby Wilder	N/A lost tiebreaker to Western Kentucky	

† Co-champions

=== Playoffs ===
The Monarchs appeared in the Division I-AA/FCS Playoffs twice in the only two years that they were in FCS competition before moving up to FBS. Their combined record is 2–2.

Year	Ranking	Round	Opponent	Result
2011	No. 10	First Round; Second Round	Norfolk State; No. 3 Georgia Southern	W 35–18; L 48–55
2012	No. 3	First Round; Second Round	Coastal Carolina; No. 6 Georgia Southern	W 63–35; L 35–49

=== Bowl games ===
Old Dominion has been invited to 4 bowl games, and the Monarchs currently hold a 2–2 record.

Season	Coach	Bowl	Opponent	Result
2016	Bobby Wilder	Bahamas Bowl	Eastern Michigan Eagles	W 24–20
2021	Ricky Rahne	Myrtle Beach Bowl	Tulsa Golden Hurricane	L 17–30
2023	Ricky Rahne	Famous Toastery Bowl	Western Kentucky Hilltoppers	L 35–38^{OT}
2025	Ricky Rahne	Cure Bowl	South Florida Bulls	W 24–10

== Rivalries ==
=== James Madison ===
On October 26, 2022, the Old Dominion Monarchs and in-state rival James Madison Dukes announced the official beginning of the "Royal Rivalry". As the Virginia-based schools within the Sun Belt Conference, they will compete for an all-sports trophy that contains a football component and draws its name from the royal inspiration of both schools' mascots.

The all-time football series between the two schools is 2–5, dating back to their days in the CAA. JMU won the most recent meeting 46-20 on September 26, 2026.

=== William & Mary ===
A declared rivalry with the William & Mary Tribe lasted two years before the Monarchs began their FBS transfer process in 2013. The annual CAA divisional battles were coined the ‘Battle for the Silver Mace' with the winner to be presented with a replica of the Norfolk Mace on display at the Chrysler Museum of Art.

=== Norfolk State ===
Despite ODU's transfer to the FBS, Norfolk State remained on the Monarchs' schedule as an FCS opponent for their 2015 and 2019 seasons. They are set to face the Monarchs again in 2026.

=== Other rivalries ===
Other regional FBS rivals for the Monarchs include; East Carolina, Liberty, and Virginia Tech.

== Individual awards ==
=== All-Americans ===
Year	Name	Position
2009	Jonathan Plisco	P
2009	Dustin Phillips	LS
2011	Jonathan Plisco	P
2011	Ronnie Cameron	DL
2012	Taylor Heinicke	QB
2012	Jonathan Plisco	P
2012	Chris Burnette	DT
2012	Nick Mayers	WR
2012	Rick Lovato	LS
2022	Jason Henderson	LB
2023	Jason Henderson	LB

National Awards

- Walter Payton Award
  FCS Most Outstanding Offensive Player

QB Taylor Heinicke – 2012

- FCS Player of the Year

QB Taylor Heinicke – 2012

- Dudley Award
  Virginia's Best College Player

QB Taylor Heinicke – 2012

Conference Awards

- Offensive Player of the Year

QB Taylor Heinicke – 2012 CAA

- Defensive Player of the Year

DT Ronnie Cameron – 2011 CAA

- Freshman of the Year

RB Ray Lawry – 2014 C-USA

- Source: Old Dominion Athletics, The Sports Network

== Future non-conference opponents ==
Announced schedules as of June 25, 2026.

2026	2027	2028	2029	2030	2031	2032	2033
Norfolk State	Norfolk State	Hampton	William & Mary	Army	FIU	at Army	at Liberty
at Virginia Tech	at California	at FIU	at East Carolina	East Carolina	at East Carolina	Central Michigan	
East Carolina	at Central Michigan	UConn		at Virginia Tech	Bowling Green		
at UConn	Charlotte				at Charlotte		

== List of retired jerseys ==
Old Dominion is set to retire their first jersey in football on October 15, 2026.

Old Dominion Monarchs retired numbers
No.	Player	Pos.	Tenure	No. ret.
14	Taylor Heinicke	QB	2011–2014	October 15, 2026
