= Bobby Wilder =

American football player and coach (born 1964)

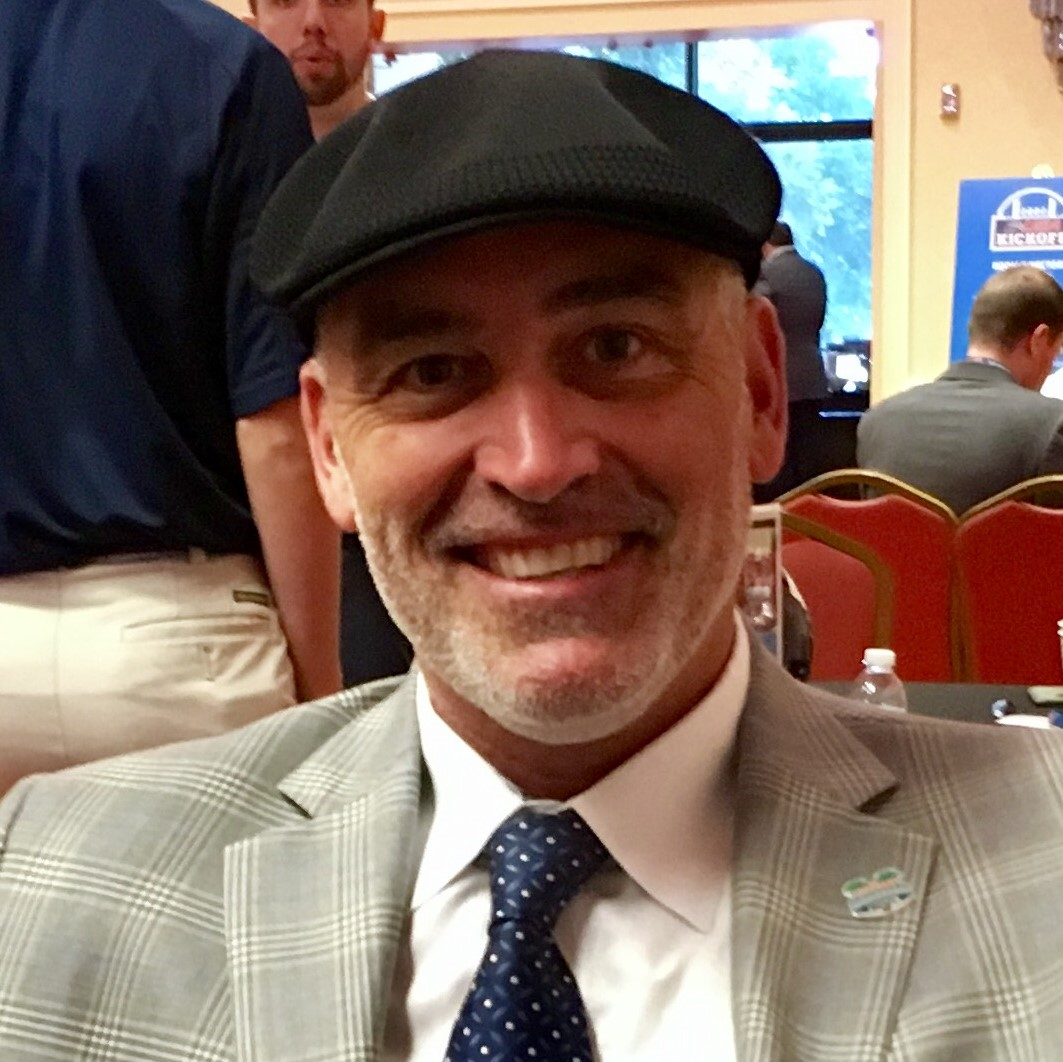
- Wilder at 2017 C-USA Media Days

Current position
- Title: Head coach
- Team: Tennessee Tech
- Conference: SoCon
- Record: 27–9

Biographical details
- Born: August 1, 1964 (age 62)

Playing career
- 1983–1986: Maine
- Position: Quarterback

Coaching career (HC unless noted)
- 1988–1989: Boston College (GA)
- 1990: Maine (RB)
- 1991: Maine (assistant DL)
- 1992: Maine (DL)
- 1993: Maine (WR/TE)
- 1994–1999: Maine (QB)
- 2000–2006: Maine (AHC/OC/QB)
- 2009–2019: Old Dominion
- 2024–present: Tennessee Tech

Head coaching record
- Overall: 104–65
- Bowls: 1–0
- Tournaments: 2–3 (NCAA D-I playoffs)

Accomplishments and honors

Championships
- 1 C-USA East Division (2016); 2 OVC–Big South (2024, 2025)

Awards
- American Football Monthly Coach of the Year (2012); Division I Independent Coach of the Year (2013)

Robert S. Wilder (born August 1, 1964) is an American college football coach who serves as the head football coach for Tennessee Tech University. Before that, served as the head coach of the Old Dominion Monarchs football team. He was only the second coach all-time in the program's history and the first since football's rebirth at the school in the NCAA Division I Football Championship Subdivision (FCS) in 2009.

Hired in 2007, Wilder spent the first two years recruiting and starting up the program. In 2009, in his first competitive season as head coach, the Monarchs finished 9–2. That was the best winning record ever for a first-year program in college football's modern era. The Monarchs were outscored by a total of only eight points in their two losses.

Wilder's inaugural team finished the year ranked in the top ten in five FCS statistical categories, including second in sacks allowed, third in scoring offense, turnover margin and net punting. The 2009 Monarchs were ninth in rushing offense.

ODU was fifth in FCS attendance in 2009, selling out all of their home games in the 19,782-seat Foreman Field.

In his first three years, Wilder led Old Dominion to a 26–7 record. In 2011, in the Monarchs first season in the Colonial Athletic Association, they earned a berth in the 2011 FCS playoffs, hosting crosstown rival Norfolk State. Also in 2011, after playing 27 games in its "modern era", ODU received its first Top 25 ranking on October 3, coming in at No. 21 in The Sports Network poll. The Monarchs were ranked among the Top Ten after competing in 33 games.

In December 2023 Wilder was announced as the 13th head football coach of Tennessee Tech University.

== Biography ==
Wilder grew up in Madison, Maine and attended Madison Area Memorial High School, where he graduated in 1982. A highly recruited quarterback, Wilder opted to play his college ball close to home. Upon graduation from the University of Maine in 1987 with a degree in physical education, Wilder served as a graduate assistant coach for two seasons under Jack Bicknell at Boston College, where he earned his master's degree in educational administration in 1990. He then returned to Maine, where he was an assistant coach, assistant head coach and finally associate head coach from 1990 to 2006.

He has two sons, Derek and Drew.

== Head coaching record ==
Year	Team	Overall	Conference	Standing	Bowl/playoffs	TSN/STATS^{#}	Coaches'^{°}
Old Dominion Monarchs (NCAA Division I FCS independent) (2009–2010)
2009	Old Dominion	9–2					
2010	Old Dominion	8–3					
Old Dominion Monarchs (Colonial Athletic Association) (2011–2012)
2011	Old Dominion	10–3	6–2	T–2nd	L NCAA Division I Second Round	10	10
2012	Old Dominion	11–2	7–1	1st (Note: Old Dominion voted ineligible for Colonial Athletic Association (CAA) championship by league due to Old Dominion's decision to leave for Conference USA. Old Dominion finished first in the league and the university recognizes the 2012 team as unofficial champions of the CAA.)	L NCAA Division I Quarterfinal	6	6
Old Dominion Monarchs (NCAA Division I FCS independent) (2013)
2013	Old Dominion	8–4					
Old Dominion Monarchs (Conference USA) (2014–2019)
2014	Old Dominion	6–6	4–4	T–3rd (East)			
2015	Old Dominion	5–7	3–5	T–4th (East)			
2016	Old Dominion	10–3	7–1	T–1st (East)	W Bahamas		
2017	Old Dominion	5–7	3–5	6th (East)			
2018	Old Dominion	4–8	2–6	T–6th (East)			
2019	Old Dominion	1–11	0–8	7th (East)			
Old Dominion:		77–56	32–32				
Tennessee Tech Golden Eagles (OVC–Big South Football Association) (2024–2025)
2024	Tennessee Tech	7–5	6–2	T–1st			
2025	Tennessee Tech	11–2	8–0	1st	L NCAA Division I First Round	16	15
Tennessee Tech Golden Eagles (Southern Conference) (2026–present)
2026	Tennessee Tech	9–2	6–2				
Tennessee Tech:		27–9	19–4				
Total:		104–65					
National championship Conference title Conference division title or championship game berth
^{#}Rankings from final TSN Poll.; ^{°}Rankings from final Coaches' Poll.
