= 2016 Bahamas Bowl =

College football postseason bowl game

2016 Popeyes Bahamas Bowl
- 3rd Bahamas Bowl
Eastern Michigan Eagles	Old Dominion Monarchs
(7–5)	(9–3)
MAC	C-USA
20	24
Head coach: Chris Creighton	Head coach: Bobby Wilder
	1	2	3	4	Total
Eastern Michigan	0	0	17	3	20
Old Dominion	3	7	7	7	24
- Date: December 23, 2016
- Season: 2016
- Stadium: Thomas Robinson Stadium
- Location: Nassau, Bahamas
- Favorite: Eastern Michigan by 3.5
- Referee: Charles Lewis (Sun Belt)
- Attendance: 13,422
- Payout: US$450,000

United States TV coverage
- Network: ESPN; RedVoice, LLC
- Announcers: Steve Levy, Mack Brown, Kaylee Hartung (ESPN); Brian Hanni, Rob Best (RedVoice)

The 2016 Bahamas Bowl was a post-season American college football bowl game played on December 23, 2016 at Thomas Robinson Stadium in Nassau in the Bahamas. The third edition of the Bahamas Bowl featured the Eastern Michigan Eagles of the Mid-American Conference against the Old Dominion Monarchs of Conference USA. It began at 1:00 p.m. EST and aired on ESPN. It was one of the 2016–17 bowl games concluding the 2016 FBS football season. Sponsored by the Popeyes Louisiana Kitchen restaurant chain, the game was officially known as the Popeyes Bahamas Bowl.

== Teams ==
The game featured the Eastern Michigan Eagles against the Old Dominion Monarchs.

This was the third meeting between the schools, with Old Dominion winning both previous ones. The most recent meeting was on September 5, 2015, where the Monarchs defeated the Eagles by a score of 38–34.

=== Eastern Michigan Eagles ===
After finishing their regular season 7–5, bowl director Richard Giannini extended an invitation for the Eagles to play in the game, which they accepted.

This was the first bowl game for Eastern Michigan since the 1987 California Bowl where they defeated the San Jose State Spartans by a score of 30–27.

=== Old Dominion Monarchs ===
After finishing their regular season 9–3 and winning a share of the Conference USA East Division championship, Giannini extended an invitation for the Monarchs to play in the game, which they accepted.

This was the first FBS bowl game in school history for Old Dominion, in their third season as a member of the Football Bowl Subdivision and Conference USA, their second season of bowl eligibility, and their eighth season of the football program since resuming in 2009 following a 67-year hiatus.

== Game summary ==
=== Scoring summary ===
Scoring summary

Quarter	Time	Drive			Team	Scoring information	Score	
Quarter	Time	Plays	Yards	TOP	Team	Scoring information	EMU	ODU
1	7:43	16	58	7:17	ODU	34-yard field goal by Brad Davis	0	3
2	7:59	6	80	2:23	ODU	Zach Pascal 47-yard touchdown reception from David Washington, Brad Davis kick good	0	10
3	12:04	9	76	2:50	EMU	Sergio Bailey 5-yard touchdown reception from Brogan Roback, Paul Fricano kick good	7	10
3	9:50	5	72	2:08	ODU	Travis Fulgham 31-yard touchdown reception from David Washington, Brad Davis kick good	7	17
3	7:25	7	71	2:20	EMU	Johnnie Niupalau 5-yard touchdown reception from Brogan Roback, Paul Fricano kick good	14	17
3	0:12	14	66	5:11	EMU	24-yard field goal by Paul Fricano	17	17
4	12:56	7	72	2:09	ODU	Jonathan Duhart 5-yard touchdown reception from David Washington, Brad Davis kick good	17	24
4	9:08	10	77	3:39	EMU	19-yard field goal by Paul Fricano	20	24
"TOP" = time of possession. For other American football terms, see Glossary of American football.							20	24

=== Statistics ===
Statistics	EMU	ODU
First downs	28	20
Total offense, plays – yards	85–470	59–394
Rushes-yards (net)	38–170 (4.5)	39–206 (5.3)
Passing yards (net)	300	188
Passes, Comp-Att-Int	26–47–1	11–20–1
Time of Possession	32:30	27:30
