= Tommy Scott (coach) =

American football player and coach (1907–1962)

Biographical details
- Born: October 9, 1907; Onancock, Virginia, U.S.
- Died: June 1962 (aged 54)

Playing career

Football
- 1926–1929: VMI
- Position: End

Coaching career (HC unless noted)

Football
- 1930–1940: William & Mary Norfolk

Men's basketball
- 1930–1940: William & Mary Norfolk

Baseball
- 1931–1939: William & Mary Norfolk

Administrative career (AD unless noted)
- 1930–1940: William & Mary Norfolk

Thomas Lawrence Scott (October 9, 1907 – June 1962) was an American college sports coach. He was the first head coach of the Old Dominion Monarchs football (then known as the Norfolk Division of the College of William and Mary) team (then known as the "Braves"), which was established in 1930 and discontinued after the 1940 season for eligibility and debt concerns. He coached the Braves to a 41–35–4 record during his tenure.

Aside from coaching football at Old Dominion, Scott also coached the track, baseball and men's basketball teams despite the fact that there were no facilities to practice on for any of the programs. The Braves had to play on makeshift fields and use hand-me-down uniforms from the College of William & Mary. He retired from teaching and coaching in 1941 to pursue a business career.

Scott was a 1926 graduate of Maury High School in Norfolk, and then a 1930 graduate of Virginia Military Institute in Lexington. While at VMI, he played left end for the Keydets football team.

== Head coaching record ==
=== Football ===
Year	Team	Overall	Conference	Standing	Bowl/playoffs
William & Mary Norfolk Braves (Independent) (1930–1940)
1930	William & Mary Norfolk	3–1			
1931	William & Mary Norfolk	1–0–1			
1932	William & Mary Norfolk	6–3–1			
1933	William & Mary Norfolk	5–3			
1934	William & Mary Norfolk	2–4–2			
1935	William & Mary Norfolk	8–1			
1936	William & Mary Norfolk	4–4			
1937	William & Mary Norfolk	5–3			
1938	William & Mary Norfolk	3–5–1			
1939	William & Mary Norfolk	4–5			
1940	William & Mary Norfolk	0–6			
William & Mary Norfolk:		41–35–5			
Total:		41–35–4			
