= 2009 Old Dominion Monarchs football team =

American college football season

2009 Old Dominion Monarchs football
- Conference: Independent
- Record: 9–2
- Head coach: Bobby Wilder (1st season)
- Offensive coordinator: Brian Scott (1st season)
- Offensive scheme: Hurry-up spread option
- Defensive coordinator: Andy Rondeau (1st season)
- Base defense: 3–4
- Home stadium: Foreman Field at S. B. Ballard Stadium

2009 NCAA Division I FCS independents football standings
	Conf.			Overall
Team	W		L	W		L
Old Dominion		–		9	–	2
North Carolina Central		–		4	–	7
Savannah State		–		2	–	8
Winston–Salem State		–		1	–	10

The 2009 Old Dominion Monarchs football team was an American football team that represented Old Dominion University as an independent during the 2009 NCAA Division I FCS football season. Led by first-year head coach Bobby Wilder, the Monarchs compiled a record of 9–2. This was the Old Dominion's first season of college football in 69 years, as the school, then known as the Norfolk Division of the College of William & Mary, had discontinued the sport after the 1940 season. The team played home games at Foreman Field at S. B. Ballard Stadium in Norfolk, Virginia.

== Schedule ==
Date	Time	Opponent	Site	TV	Result	Attendance
September 5	6:00 pm	Chowan	Foreman Field at S. B. Ballard Stadium; Norfolk, VA	Cox, TCN	W 36–21	19,782
September 12	6:00 pm	Virginia Union	Foreman Field at S. B. Ballard Stadium; Norfolk, VA		W 49–17	19,782
September 19	1:00 pm	at Jacksonville	D. B. Milne Field; Jacksonville, FL		W 28–27	5,023
September 26	6:00 pm	Monmouth	Foreman Field at S. B. Ballard Stadium; Norfolk, VA		L 28–31	19,782
October 3	1:00 pm	at Fordham	Coffey Field; Bronx, NY		L 29–34	3,673
October 10	6:00 pm	Presbyterian	Foreman Field at S. B. Ballard Stadium; Norfolk, VA		W 34–16	19,782
October 17	6:00 pm	Campbell	Foreman Field at S. B. Ballard Stadium; Norfolk, VA		W 28–17	19,782
October 24	5:00 pm	at Savannah State	Ted Wright Stadium; Savannah, GA		W 38–17	2,743
October 31	6:00 pm	Georgetown	Foreman Field at S. B. Ballard Stadium; Norfolk, VA		W 31–10	19,782
November 7	2:00 pm	North Carolina Central^{†}	Foreman Field at S. B. Ballard Stadium; Norfolk, VA		W 42–28	19,782
November 21	1:30 pm	at VMI	Alumni Memorial Field; Lexington, VA		W 42–35	8,132
^{†}Homecoming; All times are in Eastern time

== Preseason ==
Season tickets for the Monarchs' inaugural 2009 season oversold and the school had to refund 1,065 orders.

== Game summaries ==
=== Chowan ===
	1	2	3	4	Total
Chowan	6	9	0	6	21
Old Dominion	16	13	7	0	36

September 5, 2009 was a new start, and proved to be the perfect ending. Old Dominion played its first football game in 69 years against a Division II school from North Carolina, the Chowan Hawks, in front of a sold-out 19,782 fans. Old Dominion won 36–21. The defensive line dominated Chowan's offensive line and ODU's defense forced 5 turnovers. ODU quarterback, Thomas DeMarco, hooked up with wide receiver Marquel Thomas for a 50-yard pass play that marked the first touchdown for ODU in 69 years. DeMarco ended the game going 11 for 20 for 123 yards, 6 of those completions were to Reid Evans, who finished the game with 93 yards receiving.

Edmon McClam set a new FCS record with three blocked XP attempts in one game.

=== Virginia Union ===
	1	2	3	4	Total
Virginia Union	0	10	7	0	17
Old Dominion	14	21	7	7	49

On September 12, 2009 ODU hosted the Division II Virginia Union Panthers and won in front of another sellout crowd, 49–17.

ODU's defense only gave up 237 yards of total offense, and gained 443 yards themselves. ODU forced 4 turnovers, and quickly jumped out to a 21–0 lead in the 2nd quarter due to an unexpected onside kick. By halftime ODU was winning 35–10 and quarterback Thomas DeMarco had already scored 4 touchdowns, 2 in the air and 2 on the ground. DeMarco finished with 198 yards passing and 39 yards rushing. Running back Mario Crawford led the game with 71 yards rushing and wide receiver Dorian Jackson led the game with 79 yards receiving.

=== Jacksonville ===
	1	2	3	4	Total
Old Dominion	0	7	7	14	28
Jacksonville	13	7	0	7	27

September 19, 2009 marked ODU's first road game. It was ODUs first Division I-AA opponent, and was ODU's first come-from-behind win. ODU traveled to Florida to face the Jacksonville Dolphins. ODU won 28–27.

Jacksonville was the first opponent that was supposed to be a challenge. Coming off two easy wins against smaller opponents, this was ODU's first test. Trailing 20–7 at halftime, ODU opened the 2nd half with a quick score by Mario Crawford and headed into the 4th quarter trailing 20–14. After trading touchdowns early in the 4th quarter, ODU received the ball with just over 1:30 left in the game. Thomas DeMarco quickly marched his team down the field and found Dorian Jackson for a 32-yard touchdown pass with only 45 seconds remaining in the game.

Thomas DeMarco finished with 175 yards passing and 136 yards rushing. Reid Evans had 7 receptions for 86 yards, and the ODU defense forced 4 turnovers.

=== Monmouth ===
	1	2	3	4	Total
Monmouth	7	7	10	7	31
Old Dominion	14	0	7	7	28

September 26, 2009 was the day of ODU's new football team's first loss. The loss came at the hands of the Monmouth Hawks, in front of another sold-out ODU crowd, 31–28. ODU did not have an answer for Monmouth's running back David Sinisi who ran the ball 41 times for 216 yards, and also threw a 24-yard touchdown pass on a halfback option play. Sinisi ran for 2 first-downs on Monmouth's final possession of the game when ODU was trying to force a punt, in hopes of possibly winning the game. Because of that Monmouth ended the game with possession. Thomas DeMarco passed for a season high 215 yards while running for 42 more. ODU only forced 2 turnovers while averaging 4.3 takeaways a game coming into this game. Time of possession was very lopsided, with ODU's TOP being 20:49 and Monmouth's being 39:11.

=== Fordham ===
	1	2	3	4	Total
Old Dominion	7	0	7	15	29
Fordham	3	15	7	9	34

On October 3, 2009 the Monarchs suffered the second loss of the 2009 season. The Monarchs traveled to The Bronx to face off against the Fordham University Rams and future NFL draft pick John Skelton. On the wet and muggy day, the Rams managed to outperform the Old Dominion Monarchs as Skelton threw for two touchdowns and 402 yards. Down 25–7 at halftime, the Monarchs took advantage of Fordham turnovers. Old Dominion quarterback Thomas DeMarco threw for 240 yards and 3 touchdowns. After a two-point conversion play and a Carlos Davis touchdown, the Monarchs took a 29–28 lead with just under 7 minutes left in the game. The Rams regained possession with very little time left and managed to score on the pursuing drive to lead 34–29. On Old Dominion's last possession, with under a minute left, Fordham's Bryson Wilson recovered a Thomas DeMarco fumble at midfield to seal the Fordham victory, 34–29.

=== Presbyterian ===
	1	2	3	4	Total
Presbyterian	3	7	6	0	16
Old Dominion	0	14	13	7	34

=== Campbell ===
	1	2	3	4	Total
Campbell	0	10	0	7	17
Old Dominion	7	0	7	14	28

=== Savannah State ===
	1	2	3	4	Total
Old Dominion	7	10	14	7	38
Savannah State	0	0	10	7	17

ODU quarterback Thomas DeMarco threw for 198 yards (14-of-20 passing) and three touchdowns without an interception as the Monarchs defeated fellow FCS Independent Savannah State 38–17 in Savannah, Georgia.

ODU improved to 6–2 while Savannah State (1–6) saw its losing streak extended to six games.

=== Georgetown ===
	1	2	3	4	Total
Georgetown	0	3	0	7	10
Old Dominion	17	14	0	0	31

=== North Carolina Central ===
	1	2	3	4	Total
NC Central	0	0	7	21	28
Old Dominion	14	7	7	14	42

=== VMI ===
	1	2	3	4	Total
Old Dominion	14	14	14	0	42
VMI	14	7	7	7	35
