= S.B. Ballard Stadium =

American college football stadium

- The Castle
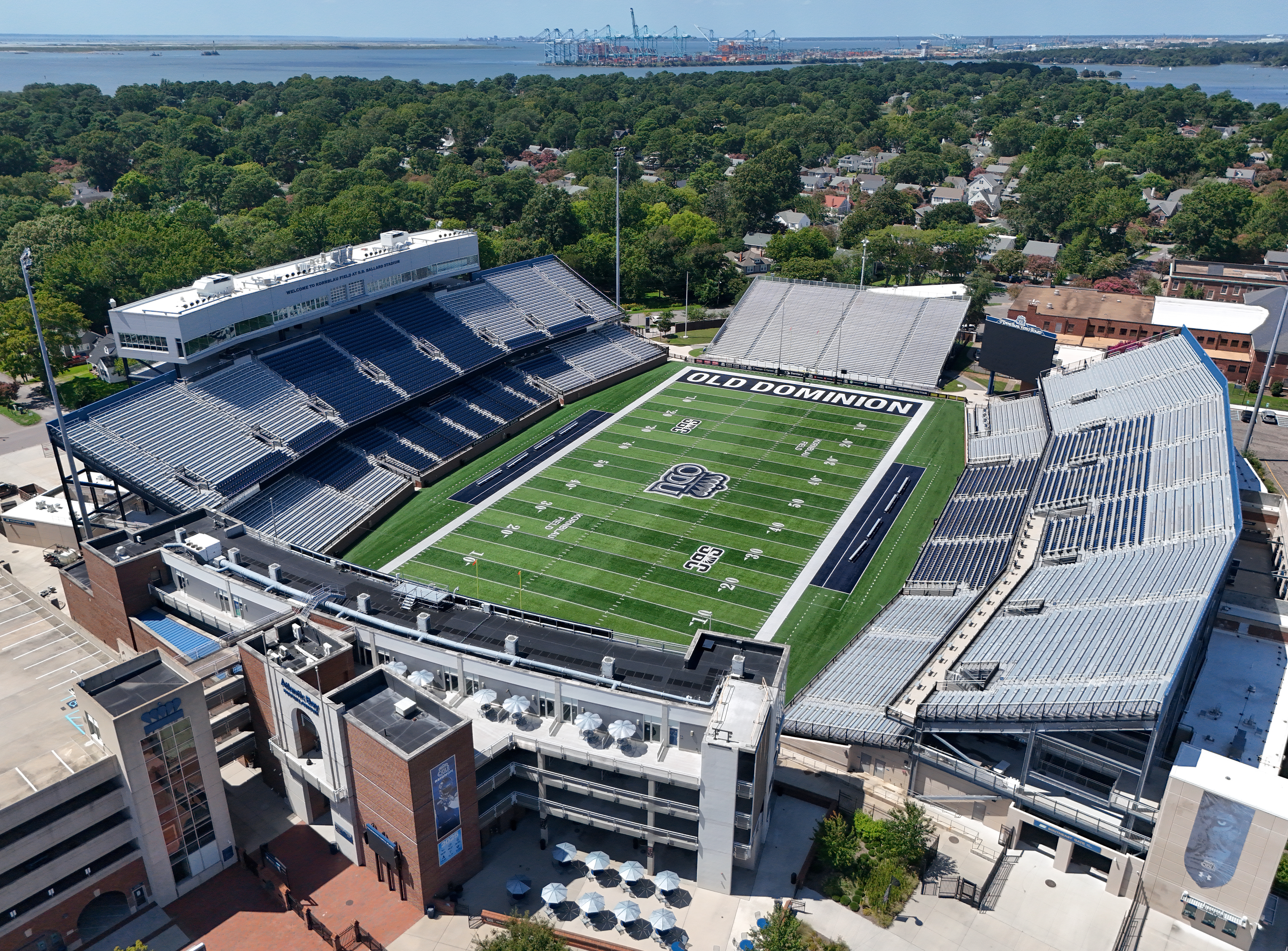

- Location in Virginia Location in the United States
- Full name: Kornblau Field at S.B. Ballard Stadium
- Former names: Foreman Field (1936–2009); Foreman Field at S.B. Ballard Stadium (2009–2018)
- Location: 5115 Hampton Boulevard; Norfolk, Virginia 23529
- Coordinates: 36°53′20.04″N 76°18′17.56″W
- Owner: Old Dominion University
- Operator: OVG360
- Capacity: 21,944 (2019–present); 20,118 (2013–2018); 20,068 (2012); 19,818 (2011); 19,782 (2009–2010); 20,000 (1998–2008); 25,662 (1981–1997); 26,000 (1957–1980); 17,500 (1936–1956)
- Surface: AstroTurf GameDay Grass 3D

Construction
- Groundbreaking: 1935
- Opened: October 3, 1936 (original stadium); August 31, 2019 (reconstructed stadium)
- Renovated: 2009, 2019
- Closed: November 17, 2018 (for demolition and reconstruction)
- Cost: $300,000 ($6.96 million in 2025) $29,521,218 (2009 renovation)($44.3 million in 2025)
- Architects: Ellerbe Becket (2009 renovation); S.B. Ballard (both renovations)

Tenants
- Old Dominion Monarchs (NCAA); Field hockey (1974–2007); Football (1936–1940; 2009–present); Norfolk Neptunes (CFL/ACFL) (1966–1971); Norfolk State Spartans (NCAA) (1986–1996)

Kornblau Field at S.B. Ballard Stadium is a 21,944-seat multi-purpose stadium on the campus of Old Dominion University in Norfolk, Virginia. It opened in 1936 with a football game between the University of Virginia and the College of William & Mary's Norfolk Division, which is now Old Dominion University. It is currently the home of Old Dominion Monarchs football.

== History ==
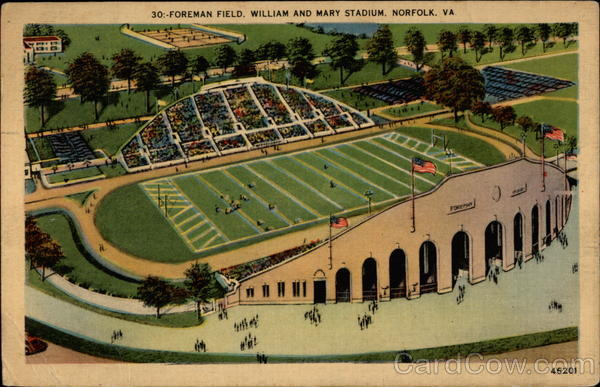
Foreman Field Postcard (c. 1946)

The stadium, originally named Foreman Field, was built to house of the first Old Dominion football program when the university was still known as the Norfolk Division of the College of William & Mary. The stadium was home to the football program from 1936 until it was discontinued in 1941. After the demise of the football program, Foreman Field hosted a number of other events. It was the site of the annual Oyster Bowl game from 1946 to 1995, featuring major college football teams in its early decades. Syracuse defeated Navy there in 1959 on its way to winning the national championship. Future NFL stars Fran Tarkenton, Roger Staubach, and Don Meredith played in Oyster Bowl games. It was also the home of the minor pro Norfolk Neptunes in the 1960s and 1970s, and the Washington Redskins played several pre-season games there in the 1960s. Over the years Foreman Field was used for several high-profile concerts including Crosby, Stills, Nash & Young's 1974 reunion tour, more than 33,000 people were in attendance.

The Virginia Ambassadors of the World Football League were to play their games at Foreman Field in 1974 before the franchise was sold and moved to Orlando. The Shreveport Pirates of the Canadian Football League almost moved there for the 1996 season before the franchise folded. The United Football League's Virginia Destroyers likewise considered Foreman Field as a potential location before instead choosing the Virginia Beach Sportsplex. A drawing of Foreman Field is featured in the John Grisham novel Bleachers.

Beginning in 1971, Foreman Field served as the home stadium for the Monarchs Field Hockey team, which used the facility until 2007. Forman Field was also home to the Norfolk State Spartans football program from Norfolk State University, also located in Norfolk, throughout the 1980s and 1990s until completion of Norfolk State's 30,000 seat William "Dick" Price Stadium in 1997.

=== Renovations ===
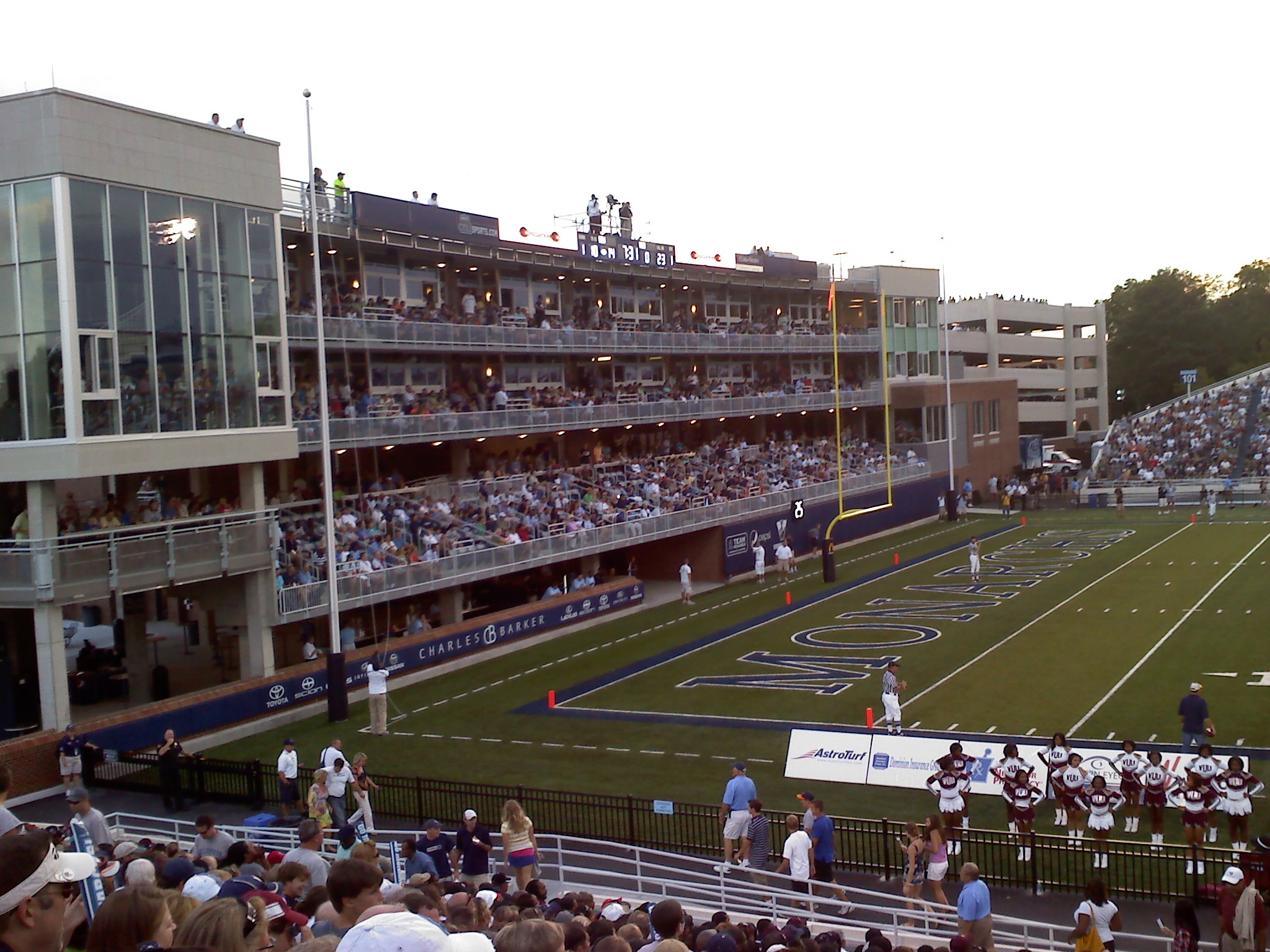
ODU Ainslie Football Complex at Foreman Field during the 2009 season

The stadium underwent a $24.8 million renovation in preparation for the start of the 2009 I-AA season. The first major renovation of the stadium included the construction of visitor locker rooms beneath the northern endzone stands and the newly built Ainslie Football Complex, which would house the Monarchs' locker room, 24 suites, and 400 lodge seats. In July 2009, the stadium was renamed Foreman Field at S.B. Ballard Stadium, in honor of the stadium contractor that donated more than $2.5 million for the stadium. On September 5, 2009, the first ODU football game was held at Foreman Field where the Monarchs defeated the Chowan Hawks 36–21.

In 2016, Populous did an expansion study and recommended that Foreman Field be torn down and rebuilt because the existing structure could not be updated to meet modern building codes. Old Dominion University endorsed the study findings and the plan to renovate the stadium was approved by the Virginia General Assembly in 2017. Phase I of the initial stadium renovation plan was to be completed between the 2018 and 2019 football seasons, with its capacity after completion being 22,130. The capacity after Phase II was planned to be over 30,000.

Old Dominion played their final game in Foreman Field's original form on November 17, 2018, against Virginia Military Institute. The $67.5 million stadium reconstruction project began with the demolition of the old grandstands on November 19, 2018, and was successfully expected to be completed in time for Old Dominion's 2019 season.

Greg DuBois, ODU's vice president for administration and finance, said the university "looked at other projects done around the country in this fashion," and we worked with the architects and contractors to assure ourselves we could do it in nine months.

"It will be a tremendous challenge, but we're confident it can and will be done on time."

On January 28, 2019, ODU officials voted to rename the playing surface to Kornblau Field following a $3 million donation from alumnus Barry Kornblau. The official capacity for S.B. Ballard Stadium during the 2019 season was 21,944.

=== Largest attendance ===
Rank	Attendance	Opponent	Result	Date
1	22,208	Virginia Tech	L, 17–37	Sept. 14, 2024
2	21,984	James Madison	L, 32–35	Nov. 23, 2024
3	21,944	East Carolina	L, 14–20	Sept. 7, 2024
3	21,944	Virginia Tech	W, 20–17	Sept. 2, 2022
3	21,944	Norfolk State	W, 24–21	Aug. 31, 2019
6	21,934	James Madison	L, 3–37	Nov. 12, 2022
7	20,895	Coastal Carolina	W, 47–7	Oct. 4, 2025
8	20,655	Arkansas State	W, 29–26	Sept. 24, 2022
9	20,532	Virginia Tech	W, 49–35	Sept. 22, 2018
10	20,162	Georgia Southern	L, 23–28	Oct. 22, 2022

== Gallery ==
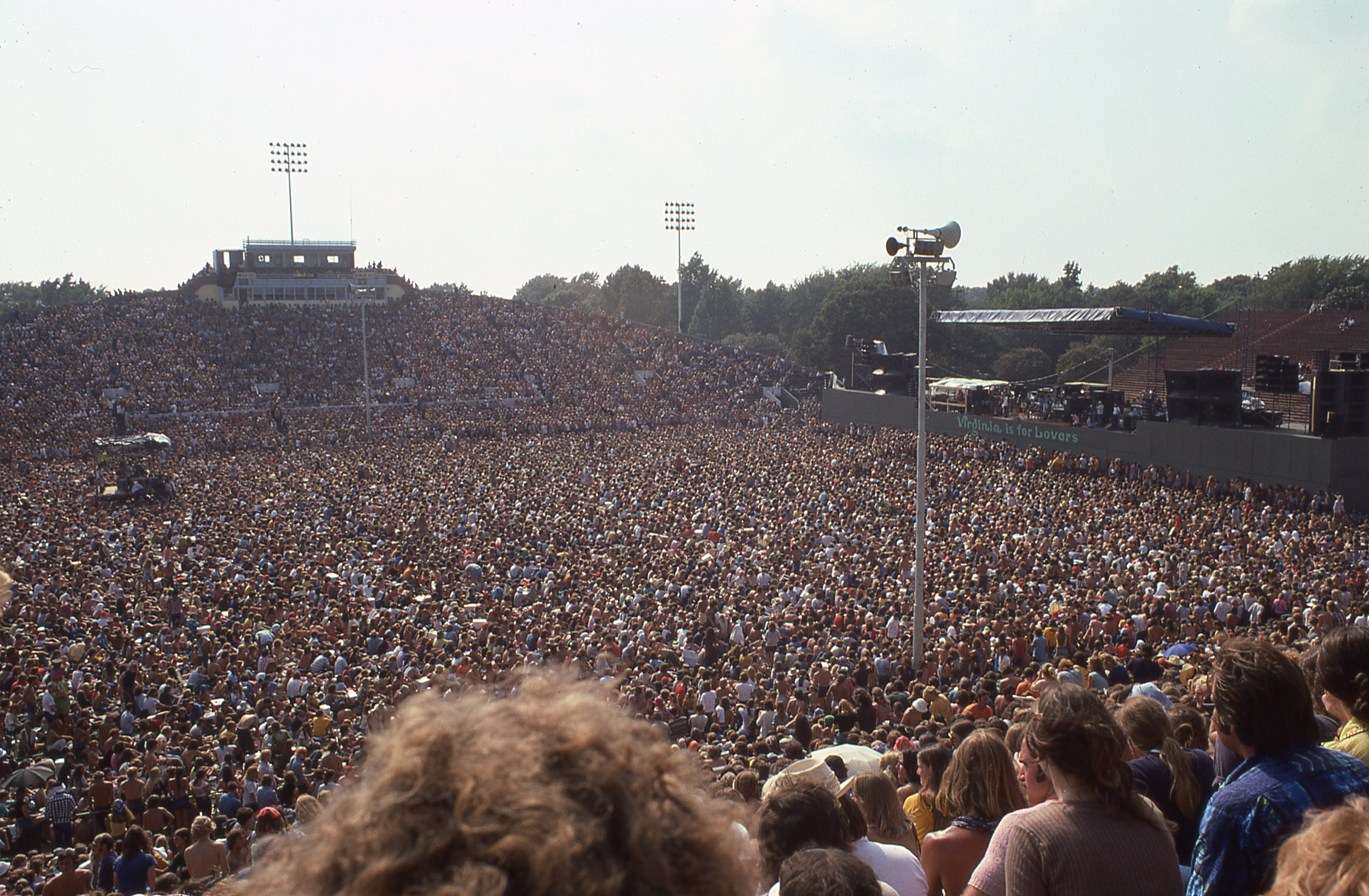
Crowd for the CSNY concert in 1974

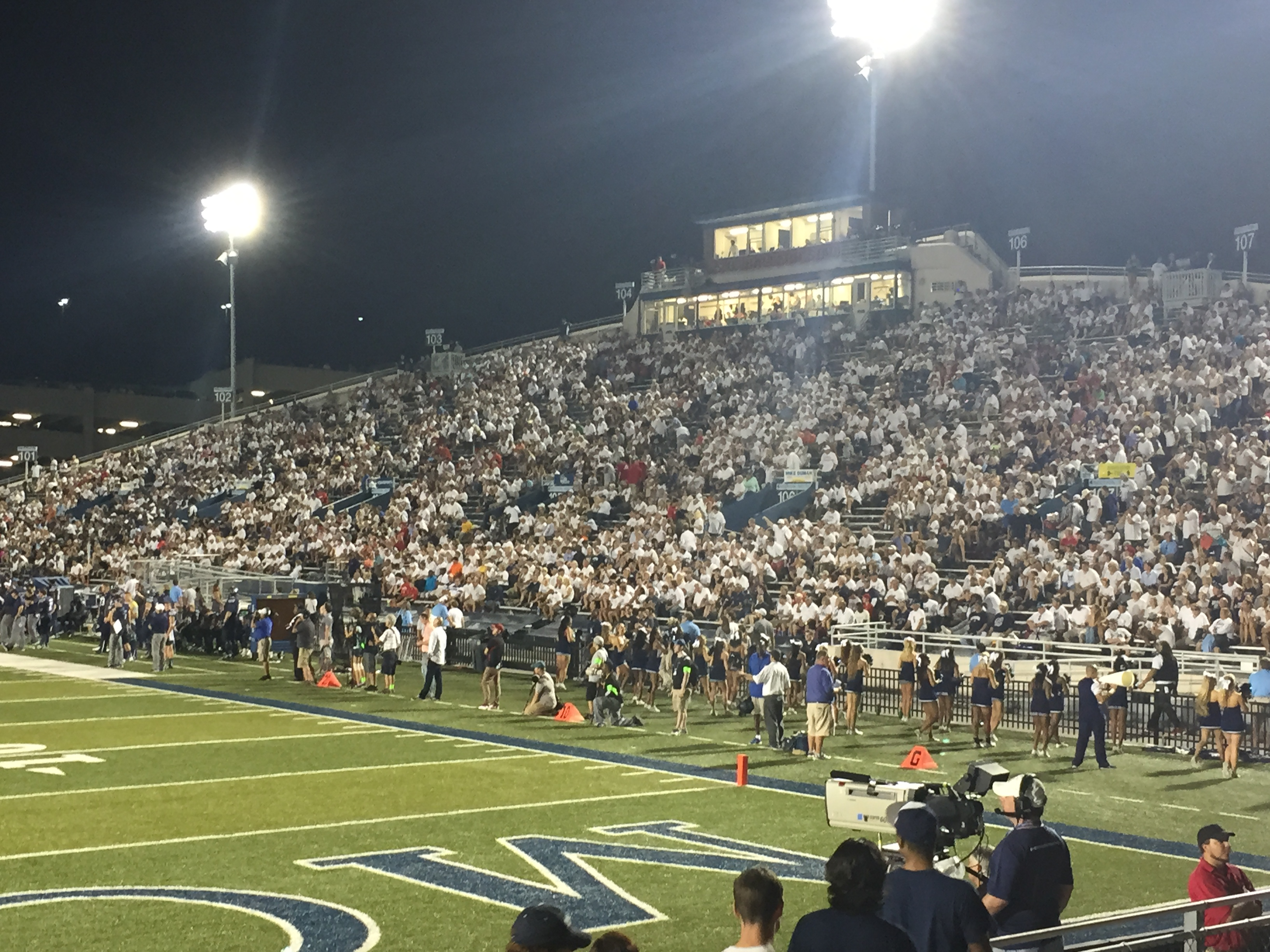
White-out at Foreman Field

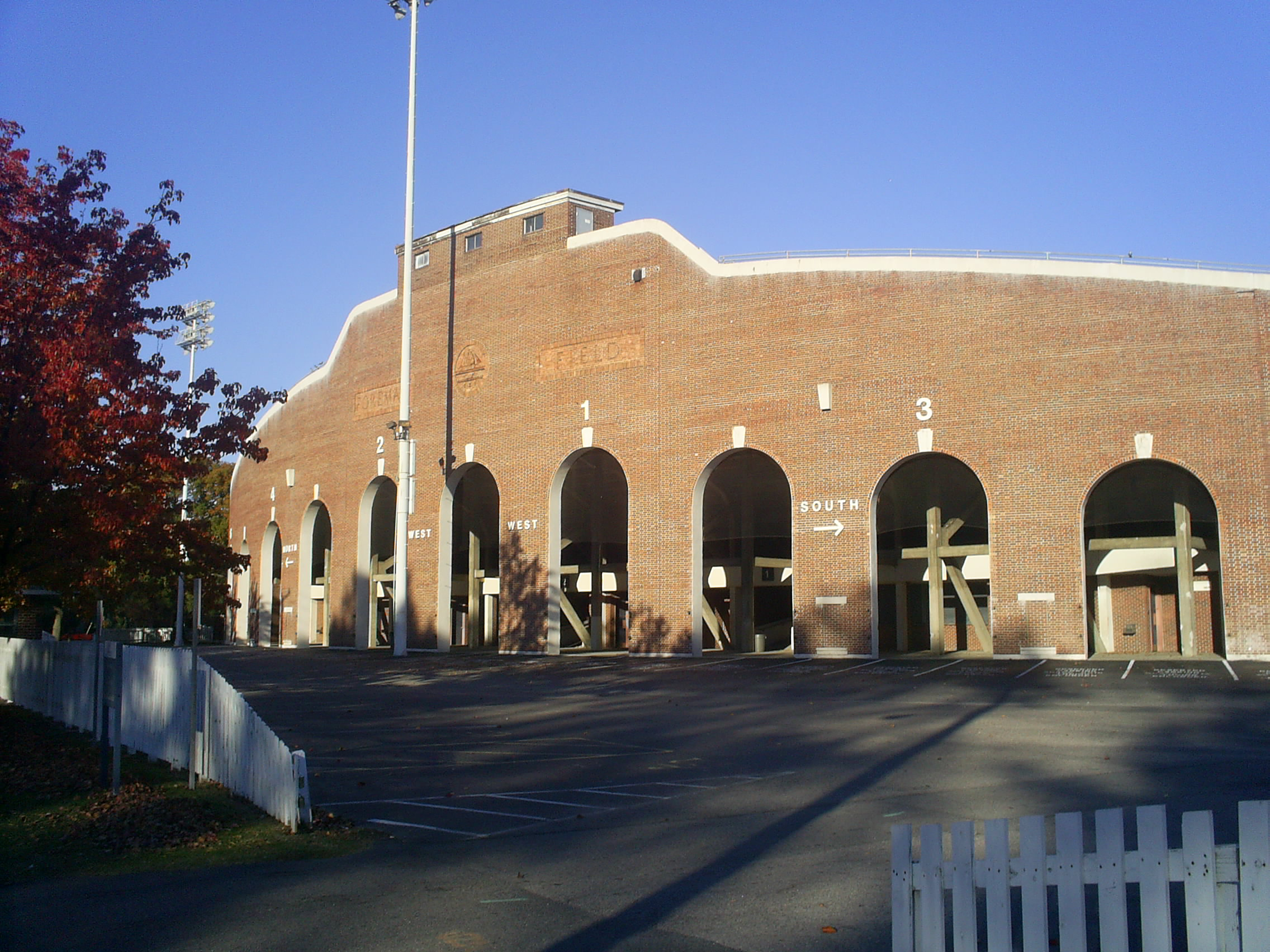
Exterior of Foreman Field home stands

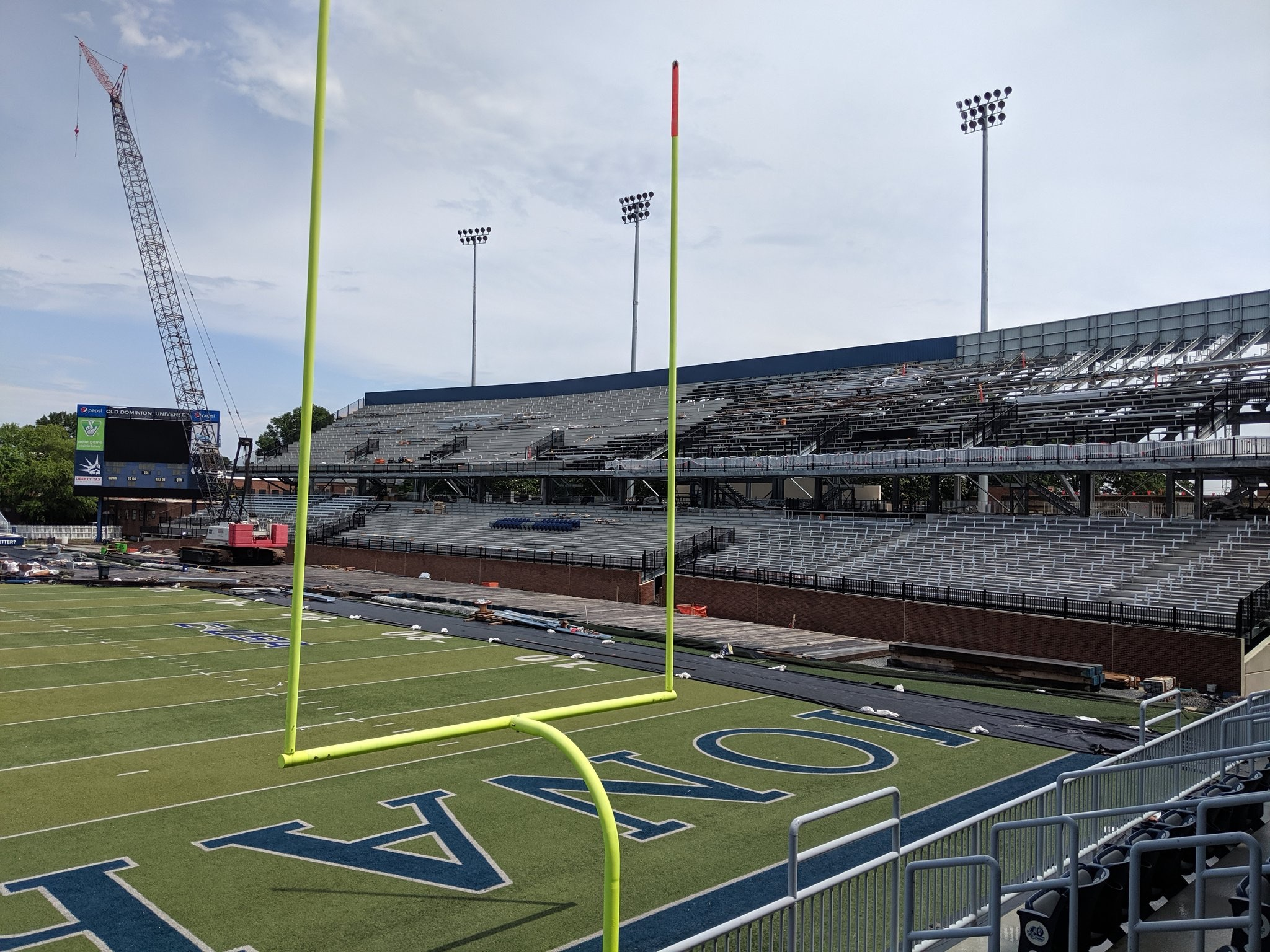
Stadium eastward stands being built

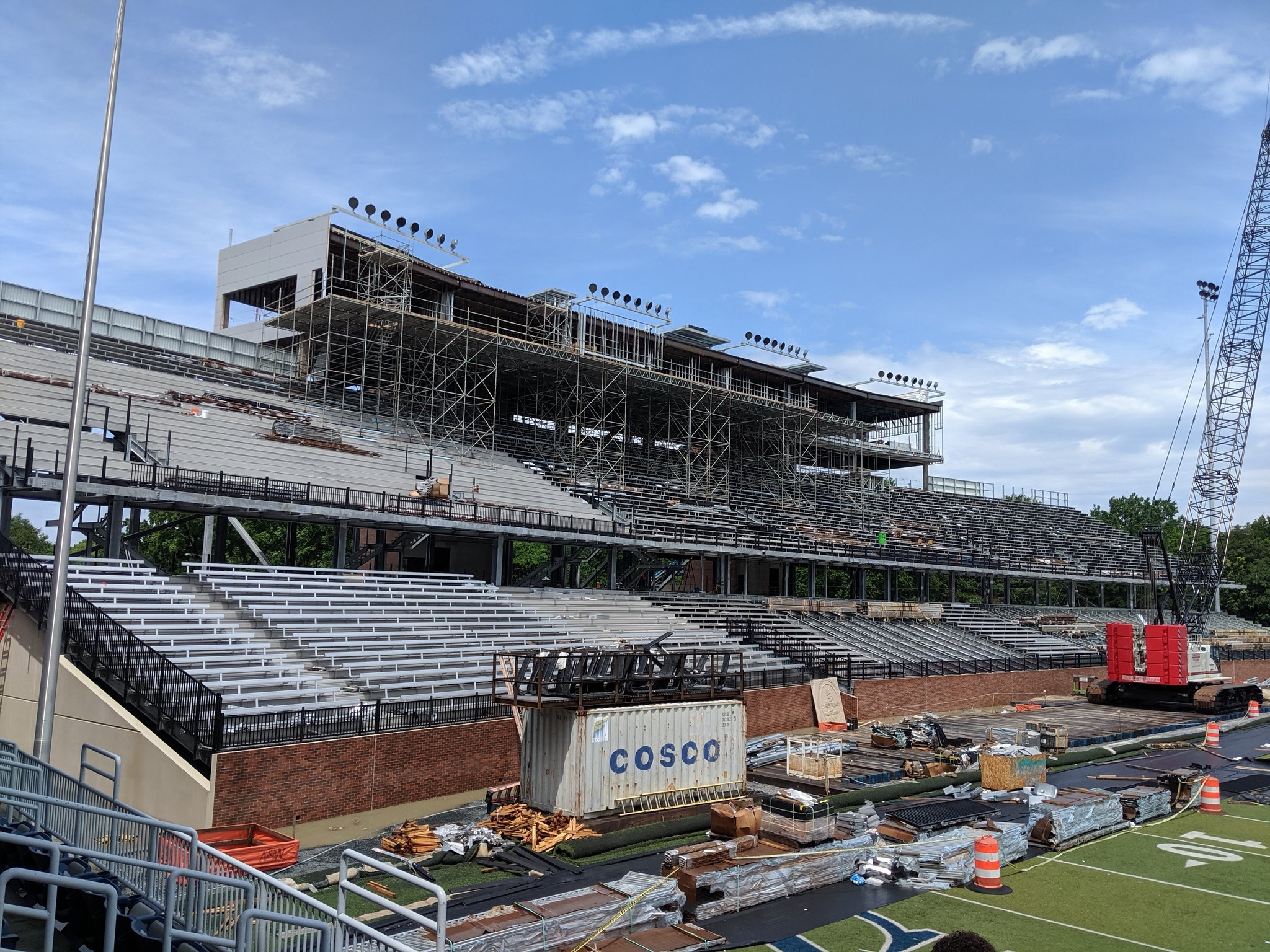
Stadium home stands and suites under construction

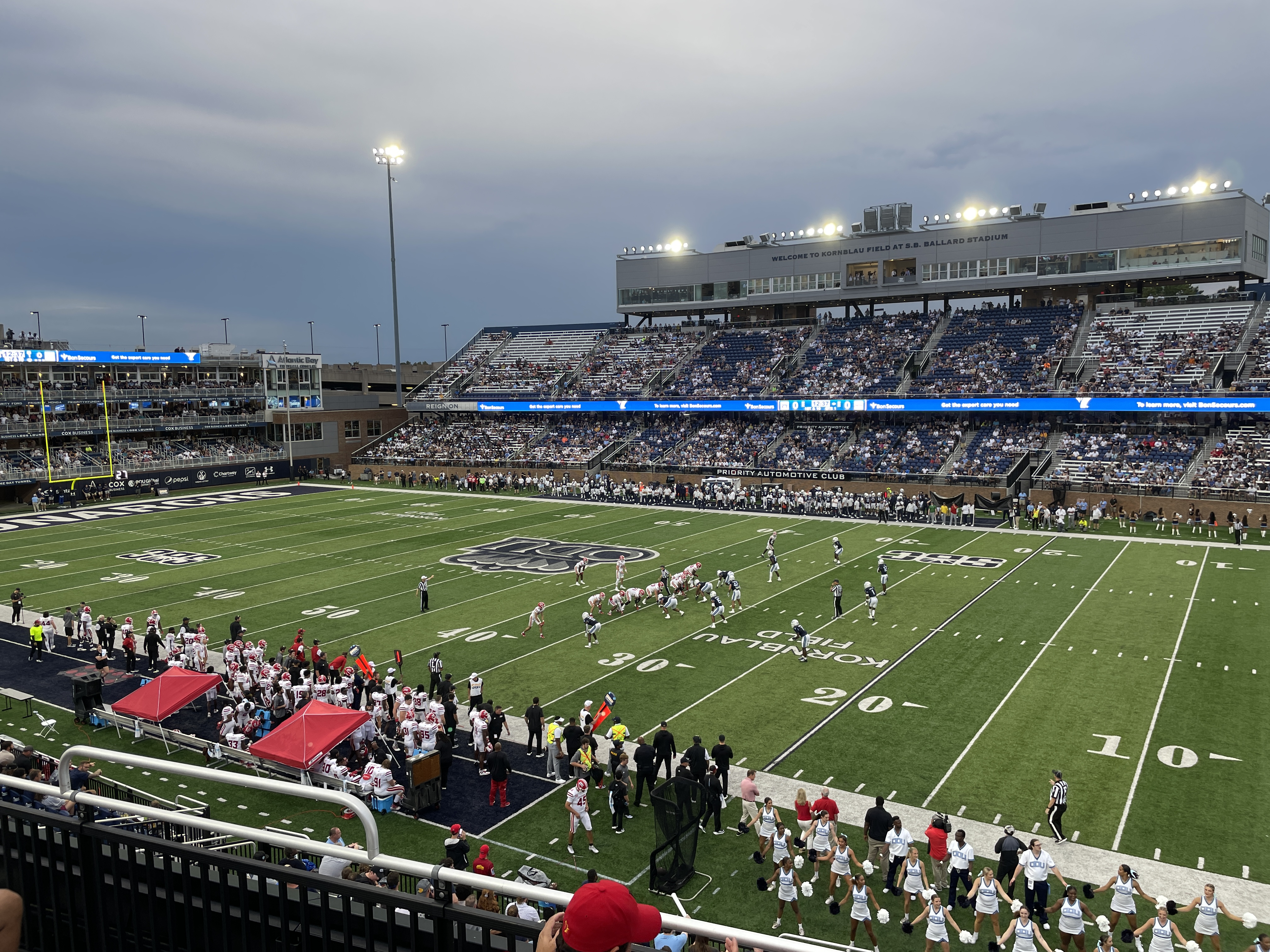
Football game in 2023

== See also ==
- List of NCAA Division I FBS football stadiums
