= 2021 South Alabama Jaguars football team =

American college football season

2021 South Alabama Jaguars football
- Conference: Sun Belt Conference
- West Division
- Record: 5–7 (2–6 Sun Belt)
- Head coach: Kane Wommack (1st season)
- Offensive coordinator: Major Applewhite (1st season)
- Offensive scheme: Multiple spread
- Defensive coordinator: Corey Batoon (1st season)
- Base defense: Multiple 4–2–5
- Home stadium: Hancock Whitney Stadium

2021 Sun Belt Conference football standings
	Conf.			Overall
Team	W		L	W		L
East Division
Appalachian State xy	7	–	1	10	–	4
Georgia State	6	–	2	8	–	5
Coastal Carolina	6	–	2	11	–	2
Troy	3	–	5	5	–	7
Georgia Southern	2	–	6	3	–	9
West Division
No. 16 Louisiana xy$	8	–	0	13	–	1
Texas State	3	–	5	4	–	8
Louisiana–Monroe	2	–	6	4	–	8
South Alabama	2	–	6	5	–	7
Arkansas State	1	–	7	2	–	10
Championship: Louisiana 24, Appalachian State 16
$ – Conference champion; x – Division champion/co-champions; y – Championship game participant; Rankings from AP Poll

The 2021 South Alabama Jaguars football team represented the University of South Alabama during the 2021 NCAA Division I FBS football season. The Jaguars played their home games at Hancock Whitney Stadium in Mobile, Alabama. They competed in the West Division of the Sun Belt Conference.

Prior to the season, South Alabama saw a near complete overhaul of its coaching staff, including Kane Wommack taking over as head coach, Major Applewhite taking over as offensive coordinator, and Corey Batoon taking over as defensive coordinator.

== Preseason ==
=== Recruiting class ===
College recruiting information
Name	Hometown	School	Height	Weight	40^{‡}	Commit date
Jake Bentley; QB	Lexington, SC	Opelika HS; South Carolina; Utah	6 ft 4 in (1.93 m)	220 lb (100 kg)	–	Feb 3, 2021
Jake Bentley; QB	Recruit ratings: Scout: Rivals: 247Sports: ESPN:					
Jason Brooks; DB	Mobile, AL	Mobile Christian	5 ft 9 in (1.75 m)	175 lb (79 kg)	–	Dec 16, 2020
Jason Brooks; DB	Recruit ratings: Scout: Rivals: 247Sports: ESPN: (73)					
Lamondre Brooks; LB	Birmingham, AL	Huffman HS	6 ft 2 in (1.88 m)	260 lb (120 kg)	–	Feb 3, 2021
Lamondre Brooks; LB	Recruit ratings: Scout: Rivals: 247Sports: ESPN: (73)					
Cole Daniels; DL	Sumrall, MS	Sumrall HS	6 ft 2 in (1.88 m)	290 lb (130 kg)	–	Dec 16, 2020
Cole Daniels; DL	Recruit ratings: Scout: Rivals: 247Sports: ESPN:					
Travis Drosos; LS	Gilbert, AZ	Perry HS; Colorado	6 ft 0 in (1.83 m)	200 lb (91 kg)	–	Dec 16, 2020
Travis Drosos; LS	Recruit ratings: Scout: Rivals: 247Sports: ESPN:					
Reid Gavin; OL	Ellisville, MS	South Jones HS	6 ft 4 in (1.93 m)	325 lb (147 kg)	–	Dec 16, 2020
Reid Gavin; OL	Recruit ratings: Scout: Rivals: 247Sports: ESPN: (71)					
Dalton Hughes; LB	Tupelo, MS	Tupelo HS	6 ft 4 in (1.93 m)	210 lb (95 kg)	–	Dec 16, 2020
Dalton Hughes; LB	Recruit ratings: Scout: Rivals: 247Sports: ESPN: (72)					
Trey Kiser; LB	Sulphur, OK	Sulphur HS; Northeastern Oklahoma A&M JC	6 ft 1 in (1.85 m)	210 lb (95 kg)	–	Dec 16, 2020
Trey Kiser; LB	Recruit ratings: Scout: Rivals: 247Sports: ESPN: (70)					
Antawn Lewis; OL	West Palm Beach, FL	Dwyer HS; Louisiana Tech	6 ft 3 in (1.91 m)	320 lb (150 kg)	–	Dec 16, 2020
Antawn Lewis; OL	Recruit ratings: Scout: Rivals: 247Sports: ESPN:					
Chris Rias; LB	Carrollton, MS	J. Z. George HS; Copiah-Lincoln CC	6 ft 2 in (1.88 m)	205 lb (93 kg)	–	Feb 3, 2021
Chris Rias; LB	Recruit ratings: Scout: Rivals: 247Sports: ESPN: (71)					
Lincoln Sefcik; TE	Enid, OK	Enid HS; Northeastern Oklahoma A&M JC	6 ft 3 in (1.91 m)	240 lb (110 kg)	–	Dec 16, 2020
Lincoln Sefcik; TE	Recruit ratings: Scout: Rivals: 247Sports: ESPN: (70)					
Edward Smith IV; DL	Tuscaloosa, AL	Central HS	6 ft 2 in (1.88 m)	260 lb (120 kg)	–	Dec 16, 2020
Edward Smith IV; DL	Recruit ratings: Scout: Rivals: 247Sports: ESPN: (70)					
Adrein Strickland; OL	Panama City, FL	Mosley HS	6 ft 6 in (1.98 m)	320 lb (150 kg)	–	Dec 16, 2020
Adrein Strickland; OL	Recruit ratings: Scout: Rivals: 247Sports: ESPN: (75)					
Jay'juan Townsend; WR	Eufaula, AL	Eufaula HS	6 ft 0 in (1.83 m)	175 lb (79 kg)	–	Dec 16, 2020
Jay'juan Townsend; WR	Recruit ratings: Scout: Rivals: 247Sports: ESPN: (71)					

=== Award watch lists ===
Listed in the order that they were released

==== Preseason ====
Award	Player	Position	Year
Maxwell Award	Jalen Tolbert	WR	JR
Allstate AFCA Good Works Team	Keith Gallmon	S	JR
Biletnikoff Award	Jalen Tolbert	WR	JR
Ray Guy Award	Jack Brooks	P	SO
Wuerffel Trophy	Keith Gallmon	S	JR

=== Sun Belt coaches poll ===
The Sun Belt coaches poll was released on July 20, 2021. The Jaguars were picked to finish third in the West Division.

=== Sun Belt Preseason All-Conference teams ===
Offense

1st team

- Jalen Tolbert – Wide Receiver, JR

Defense

2nd team

- Keith Gallmon – Defensive Back, JR

== Personnel ==
2021 South Alabama Jaguars football team roster
Players
Coaches
Offense

Pos.	#	Name	Class
QB	1	Desmond Trotter	So
WR	4	Jalen Wayne	Jr
WR	7	Jamel Thomas	Jr
WR	8	Jalen Tolbert	Jr
WR	9	Devin Voisin	So
QB	10	Tanner McGee	Fr
WR	11	Nae'Saan Dickerson	Fr
WR	12	Cade Sutherland	Jr
QB	13	Jake Bentley	Sr
QB	14	Brian Garcia	Fr
RB	15	Joshua Carter	So
WR	16	Hunter Jednat	Fr
QB	17	Eli Gainey	Fr
QB	18	Tylan Morton	Jr
WR	19	Caullin Lacy	Fr
TE	20	Brandon Crum	So
RB	21	Jared Wilson	So
RB	22	AJ Phillips	Fr
RB	24	Damean Bivins	Fr
RB	25	Terrion Avery	Jr
TE	27	Jacob Hopper	Fr
RB	31	Bryan Hill	Jr
RB	33	John Tank Miller	So
TE	35	Lincoln Sefcik	So
TE	40	Destin Myers	So
TE	41	Cameron Hatcher-Owens	So
RB	44	Keaton Halfacre	Fr
TE	46	Todd Justice	Fr
TE	47	Trent Tyre	Jr
OL	51	Tyler Jernigan	So
OL	52	Jack Green	Fr
OL	54	Antawn Lewis	Jr
OL	56	Cade Gothard	Fr
OL	58	Trey Simpson	So
OL	61	Max Smith	Fr
OL	62	Zack Nerbonne	Fr
OL	63	Dustin Woodham	Fr
OL	65	Josh McCulloch	So
OL	67	Reggie Smith	So
OL	68	Nate Howard	Fr
OL	69	Kent Foster	Jr
OL	70	Luke Hammond	Fr
OL	72	John Gill	Fr
OL	73	Hadon Merchant	Jr
OL	75	Wyatt Green	So
OL	79	Braden Moody	Fr
WR	82	Parker Kahlert	Fr
WR	83	Christian Wortham	Fr
WR	84	Victor McClinton	Jr
WR	86	Jay'juan Townsend	Fr
WR	88	Keyshawn Woodyard	Fr

Defense

Pos.	#	Name	Class
CB	1	Davyn Flenord	Jr
S	2	Jaden Voisin	So
ILB	3	A. J. Deshazor	Jr
S	4	Tré Young	Sr
CB	6	Devin Rockette	Sr
OLB	7	Chris Henderson	Sr
S	8	Patrick Rosette	Jr
ILB	9	Kelvin Johnson	Jr
ILB	10	Quentin Wilfawn	Jr
DL	11	Jamie Sheriff	Jr
S	13	CJ Thompson	Jr
CB	15	Yam Banks	Fr
S	16	DJ Exilhomme	Sr
CB	17	Ryan Melton	So
CB	18	Darrell Luter Jr.	Jr
CB	19	Dallas Gamble	Fr
ILB	20	Latarius "Kado" Carr	Fr
OLB	22	CJ Rias	So
OLB	24	Shawn Jennings	Sr
CB	26	AJ Sims	Fr
S	27	Dewayne Betts Jr.	Jr
CB	28	Isaac Mason	Fr
S	29	Keon Voisin	So
DL	30	Charles Coleman III	So
S	31	Doug Sullivan	Fr
S	32	Kwameh Lewis	Sr
S	33	Keith Gallmon	Jr
S	34	Nic Bunkosky	Fr
ILB	35	Nick Ruggs	Fr
CB	37	Brady Wiggins	Fr
OLB	39	Dalton Hughes	Fr
OLB	42	Zivaiishe Smith	So
ILB	45	Trey Kiser	So
ILB	46	Nick Mobley	Jr
DL	48	Gi'Narious Johnson	Jr
OLB	49	Christian Bell	Sr
DL	50	Jamall Hickbottom	So
DL	53	Ed Smith IV	Fr
DL	55	Maurice Strong Jr.	So
ILB	57	Sullivan Altman	Fr
DL	81	Markes Johnson	Jr
DL	89	Zyon Walker	Fr
DL	90	Carlos Johnson	Fr
DL	91	Terry Perry	So
DL	93	Ethan Rinke	Fr
DL	95	Brock Higdon	Fr
DL	96	Cole Daniels	Fr
DL	98	Zeke Chapman	Jr
DL	99	Wy'Kevious Thomas	Fr

Special teams

Pos.	#	Name	Class
LS	34	Cooper Charlton	Fr
K	36	Diego Guajardo	So
LS	37	Travis Drosos	Fr
LS	38	Gabe Adkins	Fr
P	89	Brady Phillips	Fr
P	92	Jack Brooks	So
P	94	Noah Karwacki	Fr
P	97	Frankie Onate	Jr

Head coach

- Kane Wommack (Southern Miss)

Coordinators/assistant coaches

- Major Applewhite (Texas)
  Offensive coordinator/qb
- Corey Batoon (Long Beach State)
  Defensive coordinator/s
- Jamael Lett (Tennessee Tech)
  Special teams coordinator
- Rob Ezell (Alabama)
  Tight ends
- Earnest Hill (West Alabama)
  Running backs
- Michael Smith (Kansas State)
  Wide receivers
- Gordon Steele (LSU)
  Offensive linemen
- Landius Wilkerson (Tennessee Tech)
  Defensive linemen
- Dwike Wilson (Mississippi)
  Cornerbacks
- Will Windham (Mississippi State)
  Linebackers

Legend

- (C) Team captain
- (S) Suspended
- (I) Ineligible
- Injured
- Redshirt

Roster
Last update: 9 July 2021

== Schedule ==
The 2021 schedule consisted of 6 home and 6 away games in the regular season. The Jaguars would travel to Sun Belt foes Texas State, Louisiana–Monroe, Troy, and Appalachian State. South Alabama would play host to Sun Belt foes Louisiana, Georgia Southern, Arkansas State, and Coastal Carolina.

South Alabama would host two of the four non-conference opponents at Hancock Whitney Stadium, Southern Miss of the Conference USA and Alcorn State, from NCAA Division I FCS Southwestern Athletic Conference, and would travel to Bowling Green of the Mid-American Conference and Tennessee of the Southeastern Conference.

Date	Time	Opponent	Site	TV	Result	Attendance
September 4	7:00 p.m.	Southern Miss*	Hancock Whitney Stadium; Mobile, AL	ESPN+	W 31–7	20,156
September 11	3:00 p.m.	at Bowling Green*	Doyt Perry Stadium; Bowling Green, OH	ESPN+	W 22–19	15,105
September 18	7:00 p.m.	Alcorn State*	Hancock Whitney Stadium; Mobile, AL	ESPN3	W 28–21	15,204
October 2	7:00 p.m.	Louisiana	Hancock Whitney Stadium; Mobile, AL	ESPN+	L 18–20	16,764
October 9	6:00 p.m.	at Texas State	Bobcat Stadium; San Marcos, TX	ESPN+	L 31–33 ^{4OT}	16,223
October 14	6:30 p.m.	Georgia Southern	Hancock Whitney Stadium; Mobile, AL	ESPNU	W 41–14	16,089
October 23	6:00 p.m.	at Louisiana–Monroe	Malone Stadium; Monroe, LA	ESPN3	L 31–41	11,723
October 30	4:00 p.m.	Arkansas State^{†}	Hancock Whitney Stadium; Mobile, AL	ESPN+	W 31–13	15,043
November 6	2:30 p.m.	at Troy	Veterans Memorial Stadium; Troy, AL (Battle for the Belt)	ESPN+	L 24–31	26,211
November 13	1:30 p.m.	at Appalachian State	Kidd Brewer Stadium; Boone, NC	ESPN+	L 7–31	29,348
November 20	6:30 p.m.	at Tennessee*	Neyland Stadium; Knoxville, TN	ESPNU	L 14–60	75,203
November 26	2:30 p.m.	Coastal Carolina	Hancock Whitney Stadium; Mobile, AL	ESPN+	L 21–27 ^{OT}	13,242
*Non-conference game; ^{†}Homecoming; All times are in Central time

== Game summaries ==
=== Southern Miss ===
Southern Mississippi at South Alabama

Team	1	2	3	4	Total
Golden Eagles	7	0	0	0	7
• Jaguars	0	14	10	7	31

- Date: September 4, 2021
- Location: Hancock Whitney Stadium
  Mobile, AL
- Game start: 7:00 p.m. CDT
- Elapsed time: 3 hours and 23 minutes
- Game attendance: 20,156
- Game weather: 89 °F (32 °C) • Weather: Sunny • Wind: 3 MPH
- Referee: Kevin Vicknair
- TV announcers (ESPN+): J. D. Byars (play-by-play) and Pat Greenwood (analyst)

Scoring summary
1	03:55	USM	Trey Lowe 1-yard rush (Briggs Bourgeois kick) (16 plays, 73 yards, 7:56)	USM 7–0
2	12:27	USA	Trent Tyre 1-yard pass from Jake Bentley (Diego Guajardo kick) (5 plays, 68 yards, 2:23)	TIE 7–7
2	10:29	USA	Kareem Walker 5-yard pass from Jake Bentley (Diego Guajardo kick) (4 plays, 23 yards, 1:50)	USA 14–7
3	11:48	USA	Jake Bentley 1-yard rush (Diego Guajardo kick) (7 plays, 75 yards, 3:12)	USA 21–7
3	09:51	USA	Diego Guajardo 48-yard field goal (5 plays, 47 yards, 0:50)	USA 28–7
4	00:44	USA	Davyn Flenord 48-yard interception returned (Diego Guajardo kick) (0 plays, 0 yards, 0:00)	USA 31–7

Statistics	Southern Miss	South Alabama
First downs	19	13
Total yards	259	300
Rushing yards	126	31
Passing yards	133	269
Turnovers	4	1
Time of possession	31:27	28:33

Team	Category	Player	Statistics
Southern Miss	Passing	Trey Lowe	13/29, 133 yards, 2 INTs
Southern Miss	Rushing	Frank Gore Jr.	19 carries, 81 yards
Southern Miss	Receiving	Jakarius Caston	3 receptions, 38 yards
South Alabama	Passing	Jake Bentley	17/22, 269 yards, 2 TDs
South Alabama	Rushing	Kareem Walker	18 carries, 26 yards
South Alabama	Receiving	Jalen Tolbert	5 receptions, 168 yards

=== At Bowling Green ===
South Alabama at Bowling Green

Team	1	2	3	4	Total
• Jaguars	0	6	6	10	22
Falcons	8	0	11	0	19

- Date: September 11, 2021
- Location: Doyt Perry Stadium
  Bowling Green, OH
- Game start: 4:05 p.m. CDT
- Elapsed time: 3 hours and 25 minutes
- Game attendance: 15,105
- Game weather: 78 °F (26 °C) • Weather: Sunny • Wind: SW 15 MPH
- Referee: Wayne Winkler
- TV announcers (ESPN+): Jim Barbar (play–by–play) and Tyoka Jackson (analyst)

Scoring summary
1	13:08	BGSU	Team Safety (4 plays, -8 yards, 1:52)	BGSU 2–0
1	04:53	BGSU	Darren Anders 27-yard interception returned (Nate Needham PAT failed) (3 plays, 97 yards, 0:45)	BGSU 8–0
2	14:14	USA	Diego Guajardo 22-yard field goal (13 plays, 40 yards, 5:39)	BGSU 8–3
2	00:06	USA	Diego Guajardo 41-yard field goal (6 plays, 25 yards, 0:38)	BGSU 8–6
3	11:44	BGSU	Nate Needham 40-yard field goal (8 plays, 53 yards, 3:16)	BGSU 11–6
3	10:16	USA	Kareem Walker 1-yard rush (two-point pass conversion attempt failed) (6 plays, 75 yards, 1:28)	USA 12–11
3	09:08	BGSU	Andrew Bench 33-yard pass from Matt McDonald (Tyrone Broden two-point conversion rush) (4 plays, 83 yards, 1:03)	BGSU 19–12
4	01:39	USA	Terrion Avery 13-yard rush (Diego Guajardo kick) (16 plays, 87 yards, 6:59)	TIE 19–19
4	00:00	USA	Diego Guajardo 44-yard field goal (0 plays, 0 yards, 0:00)	USA 22–19

Statistics	South Alabama	Bowling Green
First downs	21	10
Total yards	371	318
Rushing yards	114	10
Passing yards	257	308
Turnovers	1	2
Time of possession	35:29	24:31

Team	Category	Player	Statistics
South Alabama	Passing	Jake Bentley	29/46, 257 yards, 1 INT
South Alabama	Rushing	Terrion Avery	20 carries, 82 yards, 1 TD
South Alabama	Receiving	Jalen Tolbert	7 receptions, 95 yards
Bowling Green	Passing	Matt McDonald	23/32, 308 yards, 1 TD
Bowling Green	Rushing	Terion Stewart	5 carries, 16 yards
Bowling Green	Receiving	Christian Sims	8 receptions, 76 yards

=== Alcorn State ===
Alcorn State at South Alabama

Team	1	2	3	4	Total
Braves	0	14	0	7	21
• Jaguars	7	0	21	0	28

- Date: September 18, 2021
- Location: Hancock Whitney Stadium
  Mobile, AL
- Game start: 7:05 p.m. CDT
- Elapsed time: 4 hours and 42 minutes
- Game attendance: 15,204
- Game weather: 80 °F (27 °C) • Weather: Sunny • Wind: SE 4 MPH
- Referee: Trennis Livingston
- TV announcers (ESPN3): J. D. Byars (play–by–play) and Pat Greenwood (analyst)

Scoring summary
1	02:11	USA	Kareem Walker 1-yard rush (Diego Guajardo kick) (12 plays, 70 yards, 4:31)	USA 7–0
2	06:50	ALCN	Jason Longcor 0-yard fumble returned (Cristofer Thompson kick) (3 plays, -6 yards, 2:33)	TIE 7–7
2	01:49	ALCN	Javonta Leatherwood 1-yard rush (Cristofer Thompson kick) (6 plays, 62 yards, 1:59)	ALCN 14–7
3	12:12	USA	Kareem Walker 13-yard rush (Diego Guajardo kick) (6 plays, 59 yards, 2:43)	TIE 14–14
3	10:27	USA	Kareem Walker 35-yard rush (Diego Guajardo kick) (1 play, 35 yards, 0:08)	USA 21–14
3	03:37	USA	Bryan Hill 11-yard rush (Diego Guajardo kick) (10 plays, 71 yards, 4:56)	USA 28–14
4	14:19	ALCN	Juan Anthony Jr. 2-yard pass from Felix Harper (Cristofer Thompson kick) (7 plays, 30 yards, 2:24)	USA 28–21

Statistics	Alcorn State	South Alabama
First downs	13	22
Total yards	297	396
Rushing yards	32	238
Passing yards	265	158
Turnovers	1	4
Time of possession	32:00	28:00

Team	Category	Player	Statistics
Alcorn State	Passing	Felix Harper	20/33, 265 yards, 1 TD, 1 INT
Alcorn State	Rushing	Jonathon Bolton	7 carries, 16 yards
Alcorn State	Receiving	CJ Bolar	5 receptions, 128 yards
South Alabama	Passing	Jake Bentley	14/25, 158 yards
South Alabama	Rushing	Kareem Walker	23 carries, 150 yards, 3 TDs
South Alabama	Receiving	Jalen Tolbert	2 receptions, 54 yards

=== Louisiana ===
Louisiana at South Alabama

Team	1	2	3	4	Total
• Ragin' Cajuns	14	6	0	0	20
Jaguars	0	6	6	6	18

- Date: October 2, 2021
- Location: Hancock Whitney Stadium
  Mobile, AL
- Game start: 7:00 p.m. CDT
- Elapsed time: 3 hours and 11 minutes
- Game attendance: 16,764
- Game weather: Rainy • Wind: SE 6 MPH
- Referee: Marshall Lewis
- TV announcers (ESPN+): J. D. Byars (play–by–play) and Pat Greenwood (analyst)

Scoring summary
1	14:02	LA	Chris Smith 10-yard rush (Nate Snyder kick) (3 plays, 13 yards, 0:58)	LA 7–0
1	11:10	LA	Levi Lewis 22-yard rush (Nate Snyder kick) (4 plays, 57 yards, 1:24)	LA 14–0
2	11:23	LA	Emani Bailey 15-yard rush (Nate Snyder PAT failed) (2 plays, 31 yards, 0:42)	LA 20–0
2	01:33	USA	Bryan Hill 1-yard rush (Diego Guajardo PAT blocked) (11 plays, 60 yards, 5:09)	LA 20–6
3	04:20	USA	Bryan Hill 2-yard rush (Diego Guajardo PAT failed) (8 plays, 79 yards, 4:33)	LA 20–12
4	12:51	USA	Jake Bentley 1-yard rush (Jake Bentley two-point conversion pass attempt failed) (10 plays, 55 yards, 4:47)	LA 20–18

Statistics	Louisiana	South Alabama
First downs	17	18
Total yards	283	387
Rushing yards	225	144
Passing yards	58	243
Turnovers	1	0
Time of possession	23:13	36:47

Team	Category	Player	Statistics
Louisiana	Passing	Levi Lewis	9/20, 49 yards
Louisiana	Rushing	Emani Bailey	7 carries, 81 yards, 1 TD
Louisiana	Receiving	Neal Johnson	1 reception, 18 yards
South Alabama	Passing	Jake Bentley	19/29, 243 yards
South Alabama	Rushing	Bryan Hill	22 carries, 81 yards, 2 TDs
South Alabama	Receiving	Jalen Tolbert	6 receptions, 143 yards

=== At Texas State ===
South Alabama at Texas State

Team	1	2	3	4	OT	2OT	3OT	4OT	Total
Jaguars	0	17	0	7	7	0	0	0	31
• Bobcats	7	0	3	14	7	0	0	2	33

- Date: October 9, 2021
- Location: Bobcat Stadium
  San Marcos, TX
- Game start: 7:00 p.m. CDT
- Game attendance: 16,223
- Game weather: Sunny
- Referee: Jeremy Parker
- TV announcers (ESPN+): Brant Freeman (play–by–play), Keith Moreland (analyst), and Koral Riggs (sideline reporter)

Scoring summary
1	14:04	TXST	Javen Banks 57-yard pass from Brady McBride (Seth Keller kick) (3 plays, 76 yards, 0:51)	TXST 7–0
2	14:56	USA	AJ Phillips 6-yard rush (Diego Guajardo kick) (3 plays, 43 yards, 0:59)	TIE 7–7
2	08:04	USA	Diego Guajardo 35-yard field goal (7 plays, 40 yards, 2:49)	USA 10–7
2	00:02	USA	Lincoln Sefcik 1-yard pass from Jake Bentley (Diego Guajardo kick) (8 plays, 32 yards, 1:42)	USA 17–7
3	03:54	TXST	Seth Keller 43-yard field goal (6 plays, 35 yards, 3:48)	USA 17–10
4	14:12	USA	AJ Phillips 5-yard rush (Diego Guajardo kick) (9 plays, 75 yards, 4:42)	USA 24–10
4	07:17	TXST	Brady McBride 13-yard pass from Brady McBride (Seth Keller kick) (9 plays, 41 yards, 5:17)	USA 24–17
4	00:17	TXST	Jahmyl Jeter 1-yard rush (Seth Keller kick) (13 plays, 85 yards, 3:00)	TIE 24–24
1OT		USA	Jalen Tolbert 12-yard pass from Jake Bentley (Diego Guajardo kick) (6 plays, 25 yards)	USA 31–24
1OT		TXST	Brock Sturges 4-yard rush (Seth Keller kick) (7 plays, 25 yards)	TIE 31–31
4OT		TXST	Brady McBride two-point conversion rush	TXST 33–31

Statistics	South Alabama	Texas State
First downs	20	23
Total yards	329	399
Rushing yards	140	212
Passing yards	189	187
Turnovers	3	3
Time of possession	28:24	31:36

Team	Category	Player	Statistics
South Alabama	Passing	Jake Bentley	19/26, 189 yards, 2 TDs, 1 INT
South Alabama	Rushing	AJ Phillips	19 carries, 74 yards, 2 TDs
South Alabama	Receiving	Jalen Tolbert	5 receptions, 84 yards, 1 TD
Texas State	Passing	Brady McBride	18/28, 187 yards, 2 TDs, 3 INTs
Texas State	Rushing	Calvin Hill	11 carries, 70 yards
Texas State	Receiving	Javen Banks	4 receptions, 104 yards, 1 TD

=== Georgia Southern ===
Georgia Southern at South Alabama

Team	1	2	3	4	Total
Eagles	0	8	3	3	14
• Jaguars	10	21	7	3	41

- Date: October 14, 2021
- Location: Hancock Whitney Stadium
  Mobile, AL
- Game start: 6:30 p.m. CDT
- Elapsed time: 3 hours and 15 minutes
- Game attendance: 16,089
- Game weather: 82 °F (28 °C) • Weather: Sunny • Wind: S 5 MPH
- Referee: Kyle Olson
- TV announcers (ESPNU): Drew Carter (play–by–play) and Mark Herzlich (analyst)

Scoring summary
1	10:16	USA	Jake Bentley 12-yard rush (Diego Guajardo kick) (10 plays, 84 yards, 4:44)	USA 7–0
1	02:03	USA	Diego Guajardo 42-yard field goal (11 plays, 61 yards, 3:58)	USA 10–0
2	14:00	USA	Jake Bentley 6-yard rush (Diego Guajardo kick) (7 plays, 55 yards, 2:12)	USA 17–0
2	12:29	USA	Jalen Tolbert 40-yard pass from Jake Bentley (Diego Guajardo kick) (1 play, 40 yards, 0:08)	USA 24–0
2	09:08	USA	Jalen Wayne 5-yard pass from Jake Bentley (Diego Guajardo kick) (3 plays, 70 yards, 1:27)	USA 31–0
2	02:00	GASO	J. D. King 2-yard rush (Justin Tomlin two-point conversion pass to Amare Jones) (15 plays, 75 yards, 7:08)	USA 31–8
3	10:22	GASO	Alex Raynor 44-yard field goal (10 plays, 48 yards, 4:38)	USA 31–11
3	03:41	USA	Lincoln Sefcik 5-yard pass from Jake Bentley (Diego Guajardo kick) (5 plays, 82 yards, 2:37)	USA 38–11
4	14:50	GASO	Alex Raynor 34-yard field goal (10 plays, 58 yards, 3:51)	USA 38–14
4	04:55	USA	Diego Guajardo 31-yard field goal (7 plays, 49 yards, 3:49)	USA 41–14

Statistics	Georgia Southern	South Alabama
First downs	10	20
Total yards	233	545
Rushing yards	121	140
Passing yards	112	405
Turnovers	1	0
Time of possession	30:02	29:58

Team	Category	Player	Statistics
Georgia Southern	Passing	Cam Ransom	2/12, 63 yards
Georgia Southern	Rushing	Logan Wright	14 carries, 60 yards
Georgia Southern	Receiving	Amare Jones	4 receptions, 90 yards
South Alabama	Passing	Jake Bentley	24/31, 389 yards, 3 TDs
South Alabama	Rushing	Bryan Hill	8 carries, 65 yards
South Alabama	Receiving	Jalen Tolbert	11 receptions, 174 yards, 1 TD

=== At Louisiana–Monroe ===
South Alabama at Louisiana–Monroe

Team	1	2	3	4	Total
Jaguars	7	10	14	0	31
• Warhawks	7	17	14	3	41

- Date: October 23, 2021
- Location: Malone Stadium
  Monroe, LA
- Game start: 6:05 p.m. CDT
- Elapsed time: 3 hours and 4 minutes
- Game attendance: 11,723
- Game weather: 83 °F (28 °C) • Weather: Sunny • Wind: S 12 MPH
- Referee: Trennis Livingston
- TV announcers (ESPN+): Mike Hammett (play–by–play) and David Griffith (analyst)

Scoring summary
1	12:37	ULM	Andrew Henry 20-yard rush (Calum Sutherland kick) (7 plays, 75 yards, 2:23)	ULM 7–0
1	04:18	USA	Jalen Wayne 10-yard pass from Jake Bentley (Diego Guajardo kick) (8 plays, 62 yards, 4:30)	TIE 7–7
2	12:30	ULM	Jared Sparks 12-yard pass from Chandler Rogers (Calum Sutherland kick) (6 plays, 49 yards, 1:48)	ULM 14–7
2	09:13	USA	Diego Guajardo 28-yard field goal (7 plays, 55 yards, 3:17)	ULM 14–10
2	05:23	ULM	Calum Sutherland 39-yard field goal (10 plays, 53 yards, 3:50)	ULM 17–10
2	01:24	USA	Lincoln Sefcik 12-yard pass from Jake Bentley (Diego Guajardo kick) (9 plays, 65 yards, 3:59)	TIE 17–17
2	00:04	ULM	Boogie Knight 9-yard pass from Chandler Rogers (Calum Sutherland kick) (11 plays, 75 yards, 1:20)	ULM 24–17
3	10:17	USA	Jalen Tolbert 8-yard pass from Jake Bentley (Diego Guajardo kick) (10 plays, 75 yards, 4:43)	TIE 24–24
3	06:28	USA	Jalen Tolbert 40-yard pass from Jake Bentley (Diego Guajardo kick) (4 plays, 66 yards, 1:44)	USA 31–24
3	03:57	ULM	Fred Lloyd Jr. 21-yard pass from Chandler Rogers (Calum Sutherland kick) (6 plays, 75 yards, 2:31)	TIE 31–31
3	01:07	ULM	Will Derrick 81-yard pass from Chandler Rogers (Calum Sutherland kick) (2 plays, 82 yards, 0:35)	ULM 38–31
4	06:28	ULM	Calum Sutherland 40-yard field goal (10 plays, 51 yards, 5:32)	ULM 41–31

Statistics	South Alabama	Louisiana–Monroe
First downs	22	25
Total yards	409	555
Rushing yards	89	186
Passing yards	320	369
Turnovers	3	1
Time of possession	34:18	25:42

Team	Category	Player	Statistics
South Alabama	Passing	Jake Bentley	30/41, 320 yards, 4 TDs, 2 INTs
South Alabama	Rushing	Terrion Avery	14 carries, 87 yards
South Alabama	Receiving	Jalen Tolbert	10 receptions, 155 yards, 2 TDs
Louisiana–Monroe	Passing	Chandler Rogers	25/35, 369 yards, 4 TDs
Louisiana–Monroe	Rushing	Andrew Henry	18 carries, 88 yards, 1 TD
Louisiana–Monroe	Receiving	Will Derrick	5 receptions, 135 yards, 1 TD

=== Arkansas State ===
Arkansas State at South Alabama

Team	1	2	3	4	Total
Red Wolves	0	7	3	3	13
• Jaguars	14	14	0	3	31

- Date: October 30, 2021
- Location: Hancock Whitney Stadium
  Mobile, AL
- Game start: 4:00 p.m. CDT
- Elapsed time: 3 hours and 21 minutes
- Game attendance: 15,043
- Game weather: 59 °F (15 °C) • Weather: Cloudy • Wind: WNW 7 MPH
- Referee: Marshall Lewis
- TV announcers (ESPN+): JD Byars (play–by–play) and Pat Greenwood (analyst)

Scoring summary
1	10:48	USA	Jalen Tolbert 13-yard pass from Jake Bentley (Diego Guajardo kick) (8 plays, 79 yards, 4:12)	USA 7–0
1	05:47	USA	Jalen Tolbert 30-yard pass from Jake Bentley (Diego Guajardo kick) (7 plays, 75 yards, 3:24)	USA 14–0
2	08:10	USA	Terrion Avery 2-yard pass from Jake Bentley (Diego Guajardo kick) (18 plays, 99 yards, 8:31)	USA 21–0
2	06:21	USA	Brandon Crum 14-yard pass from Jake Bentley (Diego Guajardo kick) (2 plays, 61 yards, 0:41)	USA 28–0
2	06:06	ARST	Alan Lamar 100-yard kickoff returned (Blake Grupe kick) (0 plays, 0 yards, 0:00)	USA 28–7
3	10:05	ARST	Blake Grupe 32-yard field goal (13 plays, 61 yards, 4:55)	USA 28–10
4	06:22	ARST	Blake Grupe 43-yard field goal (13 plays, 60 yards, 4:30)	USA 28–13
4	04:06	USA	Diego Guajardo 39-yard field goal (5 plays, 29 yards, 2:16)	USA 31–13

Statistics	Arkansas State	South Alabama
First downs	14	23
Total yards	224	421
Rushing yards	38	173
Passing yards	186	248
Turnovers	4	1
Time of possession	24:19	35:41

Team	Category	Player	Statistics
Arkansas State	Passing	Layne Hatcher	19/37, 186 yards, 3 INTs
Arkansas State	Rushing	Lincoln Pare	8 carries, 32 yards
Arkansas State	Receiving	Corey Rucker	4 receptions, 67 yards
South Alabama	Passing	Jake Bentley	29/39, 248 yards, 4 TDs, 1 INT
South Alabama	Rushing	Terrion Avery	22 carries, 113 yards
South Alabama	Receiving	Jalen Tolbert	8 receptions, 94 yards, 2 TDs

=== At Troy ===
South Alabama at Troy

Team	1	2	3	4	Total
Jaguars	7	7	7	3	24
• Trojans	10	21	0	0	31

- Date: November 6, 2021
- Location: Veterans Memorial Stadium
  Troy, AL
- Game start: 2:35 p.m. CDT
- Elapsed time: 3 hours and 15 minutes
- Game attendance: 26,211
- Game weather: 62 °F (17 °C) • Weather: Sunny • Wind: NE 13 MPH
- Referee: Trennis Livingston
- TV announcers (ESPN+): Will Kollmeyer (play–by–play) and Ben Stanfield (analyst)

Scoring summary
1	10:24	USA	Desmond Trotter 4-yard rush (Diego Guajardo kick) (10 plays, 88 yards, 4:13)	USA 7–0
1	07:15	TROY	Brooks Buce 22-yard field goal (6 plays, 17 yards, 1:55)	USA 7–3
1	00:56	TROY	Jamontez Woods 3-yard rush (Brooks Buce kick) (11 plays, 85 yards, 4:14)	TROY 10–7
2	10:10	TROY	Tez Johnson 31-yard rush (Brooks Buce kick) (5 plays, 76 yards, 1:39)	TROY 17–7
2	05:36	TROY	Jamontez Woods 3-yard rush (Brooks Buce kick) (6 plays, 53 yards, 2:05)	TROY 24–7
2	04:55	TROY	KJ Robertson 32-yard interception returned (Brooks Buce kick) (2 plays, 3 yards, 0:41)	TROY 31–7
2	00:09	USA	Terrion Avery 11-yard pass from Desmond Trotter (Diego Guajardo kick) (9 plays, 47 yards, 1:32)	TROY 31–14
3	01:22	USA	Terrion Avery 3-yard pass from Desmond Trotter (Diego Guajardo kick) (19 plays, 76 yards, 9:52)	TROY 31–21
4	06:45	USA	Diego Guajardo 34-yard field goal (13 plays, 49 yards, 6:08)	TROY 31–24

Statistics	South Alabama	Troy
First downs	22	17
Total yards	335	308
Rushing yards	148	107
Passing yards	187	201
Turnovers	2	1
Time of possession	36:25	23:35

Team	Category	Player	Statistics
South Alabama	Passing	Desmond Trotter	20/32, 138 yards, 2 TDs, 1 INT
South Alabama	Rushing	Terrion Avery	23 carries, 75 yards
South Alabama	Receiving	Jalen Tolbert	4 receptions, 65 yards
Troy	Passing	Gunnar Watson	11/14, 121 yards
Troy	Rushing	B. J. Smith	12 carries, 49 yards
Troy	Receiving	Luke Whittemore	3 receptions, 59 yards

=== At Appalachian State ===
South Alabama at Appalachian State

Team	1	2	3	4	Total
Jaguars	0	7	0	0	7
• Mountaineers	14	0	3	14	31

- Date: November 13, 2021
- Location: Kidd Brewer Stadium
  Boone, NC
- Game start: 1:35 p.m. CST
- Elapsed time: 3 hours and 6 minutes
- Game attendance: 20,348
- Game weather: 39 °F (4 °C) • Weather: Sunny • Wind: NW 16 MPH
- Referee: Wayne Winkler
- TV announcers (ESPN+): David Jackson (play–by–play) and Avery Hall (analyst)

Scoring summary
1	02:39	APP	Chase Brice 6-yard rush (Chandler Staton kick) (10 plays, 85 yards, 5:09)	APP 7–0
1	01:43	APP	Corey Sutton 17-yard pass from Chase Brice (Chandler Staton kick) (2 plays, 21 yards, 0:40)	APP 14–0
2	03:50	USA	Jacob Hopper 27-yard pass from Desmond Trotter (Diego Guajardo kick) (1 play, 27 yards, 0:09)	APP 14–7
3	02:18	APP	Chandler Staton 25-yard field goal (12 plays, 88 yards, 5:02)	APP 17–7
4	08:23	APP	Thomas Hennigan 14-yard pass from Chase Brice (Chandler Staton kick) (9 plays, 51 yards, 4:07)	APP 24–7
4	02:37	APP	Trey Cobb 100-yard interception returned (Chandler Staton kick) (8 plays, 82 yards, 2:56)	APP 31–7

Statistics	South Alabama	Appalachian State
First downs	17	17
Total yards	284	330
Rushing yards	58	135
Passing yards	226	195
Turnovers	2	4
Time of possession	30:05	29:55

Team	Category	Player	Statistics
South Alabama	Passing	Desmond Trotter	21/38, 226 yards, 1 TD, 2 INTs
South Alabama	Rushing	Terrion Avery	11 carries, 24 yards
South Alabama	Receiving	Jalen Tolbert	7 receptions, 108 yards
Appalachian State	Passing	Chase Brice	14/26, 195 yards, 2 TDs, 2 INTs
Appalachian State	Rushing	Camerun Peoples	23 carries, 90 yards
Appalachian State	Receiving	Jalen Virgil	2 receptions, 57 yards

=== At Tennessee ===
South Alabama at Tennessee

Team	1	2	3	4	Total
Jaguars	0	7	0	7	14
• Volunteers	14	21	14	11	60

- Date: November 20, 2021
- Location: Neyland Stadium
  Knoxville, TN
- Game start: 6:37 p.m. CST
- Elapsed time: 3 hours and 23 minutes
- Game attendance: 75,203
- Game weather: 46 °F (8 °C) • Weather: Cloudy • Wind: N 1 MPH
- Referee: Jason Autrey
- TV announcers (ESPNU): Clay Matvick (play–by–play), Rocky Boiman (analyst), and Tiffany Blackmon (sideline reporter)

Scoring summary
1	11:13	TENN	Jabari Small 1-yard rush (Chase McGrath kick) (11 plays, 62 yards, 2:00)	TENN 7–0
1	06:14	TENN	Jaylen Wright 17-yard rush (Chase McGrath kick) (9 plays, 88 yards, 1:57)	TENN 14–0
2	10:37	TENN	Cedric Tillman 27-yard pass from Hendon Hooker (Chase McGrath kick) (8 plays, 87 yards, 2:38)	TENN 21–0
2	06:41	TENN	Princeton Fant 24-yard pass from Hendon Hooker (Chase McGrath kick) (3 plays, 36 yards, 0:55)	TENN 28–0
2	01:36	USA	Lincoln Sefcik 3-yard pass from Desmond Trotter (Diego Guajardo kick) (10 plays, 75 yards, 5:05)	TENN 28–7
2	01:18	TENN	Velus Jones Jr. 96-yard kickoff returned (Chase McGrath kick) (3 plays, 2 yards, 1:04)	TENN 35–7
3	12:06	TENN	Jabari Small 3-yard rush (Chase McGrath kick) (7 plays, 84 yards, 1:54)	TENN 42–7
3	07:29	TENN	Hendon Hooker 6-yard rush (Chase McGrath kick) (8 plays, 64 yards, 2:57)	TENN 49–7
4	12:50	TENN	Len'Neth Whitehead 5-yard rush (Chase McGrath kick) (6 plays, 80 yards, 2:06)	TENN 56–7
4	11:02	USA	Jalen Tolbert 68-yard pass from Desmond Trotter (Diego Guajardo kick) (4 plays, 75 yards, 1:48)	TENN 56–14
4	06:37	TENN	Team Safety (3 plays, -9 yards, 1:40)	TENN 58–14
4	02:43	TENN	Team Safety (6 plays, 26 yards, 2:18)	TENN 60–14

Statistics	South Alabama	Tennessee
First downs	13	28
Total yards	285	561
Rushing yards	69	250
Passing yards	216	311
Turnovers	0	0
Time of possession	37:00	23:00

Team	Category	Player	Statistics
South Alabama	Passing	Desmond Trotter	19/32, 216 yards, 2 TDs
South Alabama	Rushing	Kareem Walker	7 carries, 29 yards
South Alabama	Receiving	Jalen Tolbert	7 receptions, 143 yards, 1 TD
Tennessee	Passing	Hendon Hooker	17/20, 273 yards, 2 TDs
Tennessee	Rushing	Jaylen Wright	13 carries, 83 yards, 1 TD
Tennessee	Receiving	Velus Jones Jr.	6 receptions, 103 yards

=== Coastal Carolina ===
Coastal Carolina at South Alabama

Team	1	2	3	4	OT	Total
• Chanticleers	0	0	7	14	6	27
Jaguars	7	3	0	11	0	21

- Date: November 26, 2021
- Location: Hancock Whitney Stadium
  Mobile, AL
- Game start: 2:30 p.m. CST
- Elapsed time: 3 hours and 21 minutes
- Game attendance: 13,242
- Game weather: 58 °F (14 °C) • Weather: Sunny • Wind: N 15 MPH
- Referee: Marshall Lewis
- TV announcers (ESPN+): J. D. Byars (play–by–play) and Pat Greenwood (analyst)

Scoring summary
1	06:42	USA	Lincoln Sefcik 8-yard pass from Jake Bentley (Diego Guajardo kick) (12 plays, 88 yards, 5:05)	USA 7–0
2	12:14	USA	Diego Guajardo 30-yard field goal (10 plays, 58 yards, 4:20)	USA 10–0
3	02:24	CCU	Jaivon Heiligh 10-yard pass from Grayson McCall (Massimo Biscardi kick) (19 plays, 95 yards, 9:27)	USA 10–7
4	14:49	CCU	Shermari Jones 75-yard rush (Massimo Biscardi kick) (2 plays, 82 yards, 0:17)	CCU 14–10
4	11:14	USA	Diego Guajardo 33-yard field goal (7 plays, 50 yards, 3:35)	CCU 14–13
4	04:24	USA	Jalen Tolbert 57-yard pass from Jake Bentley (Jake Bentley two-point conversion pass to Caullin Lacy) (2 plays, 75 yards, 0:24)	USA 21–14
4	00:39	CCU	Bryce Carpenter 2-yard rush (Massimo Biscardi kick) (10 plays, 82 yards, 3:45)	TIE 21–21
1OT		CCU	Grayson McCall 25-yard rush (Massimo Biscardi PAT failed)	CCU 27–21

Statistics	Coastal Carolina	South Alabama
First downs	25	20
Total yards	491	349
Rushing yards	315	-5
Passing yards	176	354
Turnovers	3	3
Time of possession	32:52	27:08

Team	Category	Player	Statistics
Coastal Carolina	Passing	Grayson McCall	16/25, 176 yards, 1 TD, 1 INT
Coastal Carolina	Rushing	Shermari Jones	23 carries, 211 yards, 1 TD
Coastal Carolina	Receiving	Jaivon Heiligh	6 receptions, 87 yards, 1 TD
South Alabama	Passing	Jake Bentley	28/41, 354 yards, 2 TDs, 3 INTs
South Alabama	Rushing	Terrion Avery	6 carries, 11 yards
South Alabama	Receiving	Jalen Tolbert	10 receptions, 191 yards, 1 TD
