= 2023 South Alabama Jaguars football team =

American college football season

2023 South Alabama Jaguars football

68 Ventures Bowl champion

68 Ventures Bowl, W 59–10 vs. Eastern Michigan
- Conference: Sun Belt Conference
- West Division
- Record: 7–6 (4–4 Sun Belt)
- Head coach: Kane Wommack (3rd season)
- Offensive coordinator: Major Applewhite (3rd season)
- Offensive scheme: Multiple spread
- Defensive coordinator: Corey Batoon (3rd season)
- Base defense: Multiple 4–2–5
- Home stadium: Hancock Whitney Stadium

2023 Sun Belt Conference football standings
	Conf.			Overall
Team	W		L	W		L
East Division
James Madison* x	7	–	1	11	–	2
Appalachian State y	6	–	2	9	–	5
Coastal Carolina	5	–	3	8	–	5
Old Dominion	5	–	3	6	–	7
Georgia State	3	–	5	7	–	6
Marshall	3	–	5	6	–	7
Georgia Southern	3	–	5	6	–	7
West Division
Troy xy$	7	–	1	11	–	3
Texas State	4	–	4	8	–	5
Arkansas State	4	–	4	6	–	7
South Alabama	4	–	4	7	–	6
Louisiana	3	–	5	6	–	7
Southern Miss	2	–	6	3	–	9
Louisiana–Monroe	0	–	8	2	–	10
Championship: Troy 49, Appalachian State 23
$ – Conference champion; x – Division champion/co-champions; y – Championship game participant; * – Ineligible for postseason play due to FCS-to-FBS transition rules

The 2023 South Alabama Jaguars football team represented the University of South Alabama as a member of the Sun Belt Conference during the 2023 NCAA Division I FBS football season. They were led by third-year head coach Kane Wommack and played their home games at Hancock Whitney Stadium in Mobile, Alabama.

== Preseason ==
=== Recruiting class ===
College recruiting
Name	Hometown	School	Height	Weight	40^{‡}	Commit date
Willis Anderson; OG	Prichard, AL	M. T. Blount HS	6 ft 4 in (1.93 m)	300 lb (140 kg)	–	Aug 14, 2022
Willis Anderson; OG	Recruit ratings: Rivals: 247Sports:					
Cole Blaylock; RB	Mobile, AL	UMS-Wright	6 ft 0 in (1.83 m)	190 lb (86 kg)	–	Dec 21, 2022
Cole Blaylock; RB	Recruit ratings: Rivals: 247Sports:					
Joe Bledsoe; DB	Lafayette, AL	Lafayette HS	6 ft 1 in (1.85 m)	190 lb (86 kg)	–	Oct 3, 2022
Joe Bledsoe; DB	Recruit ratings: Rivals: 247Sports: ESPN: (78)					
Joshua Combs; ATH	Lafayette, AL	Lafayette HS	6 ft 1 in (1.85 m)	175 lb (79 kg)	–	Oct 3, 2022
Joshua Combs; ATH	Recruit ratings: No ratings found					
La'Dareyen Craig; CB	Mobile, AL	Mississippi Gulf Coast CC	6 ft 1 in (1.85 m)	175 lb (79 kg)	–	Feb 1, 2023
La'Dareyen Craig; CB	Recruit ratings: Rivals: 247Sports:					
Brian Dillard; CB	Ocala, FL	Lake Weir HS; West Georgia; Independence CC	6 ft 2 in (1.88 m)	190 lb (86 kg)	–	Jun 14, 2023
Brian Dillard; CB	Recruit ratings: No ratings found					
Jarvis Durr; RB	Brandon, MS	Brandon HS	5 ft 11 in (1.80 m)	193 lb (88 kg)	–	Dec 13, 2022
Jarvis Durr; RB	Recruit ratings: Rivals: 247Sports: ESPN: (74)					
Anthony Eager; WR	Mobile, AL	McGill–Toolen HS	6 ft 1 in (1.85 m)	170 lb (77 kg)	–	Jun 4, 2022
Anthony Eager; WR	Recruit ratings: Rivals: 247Sports:					
Adrian Griffin; OL	Pleasant Grove, AL	Pleasant Grove HS	6 ft 5 in (1.96 m)	260 lb (120 kg)	–	Dec 21, 2022
Adrian Griffin; OL	Recruit ratings: Rivals: 247Sports: ESPN: (75)					
Gio Lopez; QB	Huntsville, AL	James Clemens HS	6 ft 1 in (1.85 m)	210 lb (95 kg)	–	Apr 15, 2022
Gio Lopez; QB	Recruit ratings: Rivals: 247Sports: ESPN: (75)					
Patrick Martin; RB	New Orleans, LA	De La Salle HS	5 ft 10 in (1.78 m)	200 lb (91 kg)	–	Jan 18, 2023
Patrick Martin; RB	Recruit ratings: Rivals: 247Sports:					
Trip Maxwell; QB	Oxford, MS	Oxford HS	6 ft 2 in (1.88 m)	180 lb (82 kg)	–	Jan 30, 2023
Trip Maxwell; QB	Recruit ratings: No ratings found					
Reggie Neely; DB	Memphis, TN	Briarcrest Christian School; East Mississippi CC; Tulane	6 ft 0 in (1.83 m)	175 lb (79 kg)	–	Dec 20, 2022
Reggie Neely; DB	Recruit ratings: Rivals: 247Sports:					
Jordan Norman; DL	Hoover, AL	Hoover HS	6 ft 3 in (1.91 m)	230 lb (100 kg)	–	Dec 21, 2022
Jordan Norman; DL	Recruit ratings: Rivals: 247Sports:					
Shamar Sandgren; WR	Savannah, GA	Islands HS; Itawamba CC	6 ft 2 in (1.88 m)	175 lb (79 kg)	–	Dec 21, 2022
Shamar Sandgren; WR	Recruit ratings: Rivals: 247Sports:					
Devery Smith; DL	Daphne, AL	Daphne HS; Dodge City CC	6 ft 2 in (1.88 m)	280 lb (130 kg)	–	
Devery Smith; DL	Recruit ratings: No ratings found					
Trent Thomas; TE	Mobile, AL	Cottage Hill Academy	6 ft 6 in (1.98 m)	225 lb (102 kg)	–	Nov 28, 2022
Trent Thomas; TE	Recruit ratings: Rivals: 247Sports:					
John Ward; OL	Atmore, AL	Northview HS (FL)	6 ft 5 in (1.96 m)	280 lb (130 kg)	–	Dec 21, 2022
John Ward; OL	Recruit ratings: 247Sports:					
Karon Weary; DE	Columbia, MS	East Marion HS	6 ft 2 in (1.88 m)	180 lb (82 kg)	–	Dec 18, 2022
Karon Weary; DE	Recruit ratings: Rivals: 247Sports:					

=== Media poll ===
In the Sun Belt preseason coaches' poll, the Jaguars were picked to finish in second place in the West division.

Running back La'Damian Webb and defensive back Yam Banks were named to the preseason All-Sun Belt first team. Quarterback Carter Bradley, wide receivers Caullin Lacy and Devin Voisin, defensive lineman Wy'Kevious Thomas, defensive back Jaden Voisin, and kicker Diego Guajardo were named to the second team.

== Personnel ==
2023 South Alabama Jaguars football team roster
Players
Coaches
Offense

Pos.	#	Name	Class
RB	0	Braylon McReynolds	So
QB	1	Desmond Trotter	Sr
QB	2	Carter Bradley	Sr
RB	3	La'Damian Webb	Sr
WR	4	Caullin Lacy	Jr
WR	6	Jay’juan Townsend	Jr
QB	7	Gio Lopez	Fr
TE	8	DJ Thomas-Jones	Jr
WR	9	Devin Voisin	Sr
QB	10	Tanner McGee	Jr
WR	11	Anthony Eager	Fr
WR	12	Jamaal Pritchett	So
WR	13	Javon Ivory	Sr
RB	14	Kentrel Bullock	Jr
WR	15	Shamar Sandgren	Jr
WR	16	Christopher Davis Jr.	So
QB	17	Bishop Davenport	Fr
WR	18	Keyshawn Woodyard	So
QB	19	Trip Maxwell	Fr
TE	20	Brandon Crum	Sr
RB	21	Jarvis Durr	Fr
RB	22	PJ Martin	Fr
WR	23	Cash Turner	Fr
RB	26	Jonathan Carter	Fr
TE	27	Jacob Hopper	Jr
RB	29	Marco Lee Jr.	Sr
WR	30	Stacey Boykins Jr.	Fr
RB	33	Dorian Smith	Fr
TE	34	Micah Turner	Fr
OL	51	Reed Buys	Jr
OL	52	John Ward	Fr
OL	55	Dontae Lucas	Sr
OL	56	Adrian Griffin	Fr
OL	57	Jayson Jarrell	Jr
OL	59	Sam Williams	Fr
OL	61	Julius Kidd	Fr
OL	65	Josh McCulloch	Sr
OL	66	Kole Payne	So
OL	67	Reggie Smith	Sr
OL	69	Kenton Jerido	So
OL	70	Adrein Strickland	So
OL	71	James Robinson	Jr
OL	73	Daniel Foster-Allen	Fr
OL	74	Reid Gavin	So
OL	75	Damon Parr	So
OL	76	Lucas Taylor	Fr
OL	77	Malachi Carney	Fr
OL	79	Jordan Davis	So
TE	80	Hollis McDaniel	Fr
WR	81	Jeremiah Webb	Jr
TE	82	Trent Thomas	Fr
WR	83	Jace Larsen	Fr
WR	85	Caeleb Schlachter	Fr
TE	86	Todd Justice	Jr
TE	88	Lincoln Sefcik	Sr
WR	89	Chris Holifield Jr.	Jr

Defense

Pos.	#	Name	Class
S	0	Keith Gallmon Jr.	Sr
S	1	Jalen Jordan	Sr
S	2	Jaden Voisin	Jr
S	3	Rickey Hyatt Jr.	Jr
LB	4	James Miller	Sr
CB	6	Ricky Fletcher	So
CB	7	Marquise Robinson	Jr
S	8	Yam Banks	Jr
ILB	9	Ke’Shun Brown	Jr
ILB	10	Quentin Wilfawn	Sr
DL	11	Jamie Sheriff	Sr
DL	12	Jamall Hickbottom	Jr
S	13	Christopher Wallace Jr.	So
S	14	Cole Blaylock	Fr
LB	15	Chrystyile Caldwell	Fr
CB	16	Jamarrien Burt	Fr
CB	17	Reggie Neely	Jr
DL	18	RJ Moss Jr.	Fr
CB	19	Dallas Gamble	Jr
DL	20	Lamondre Brooks	So
DL	21	Jordan Norman	Fr
ILB	22	Trey Kiser	Sr
S	23	Tremel States-Jones	So
CB	24	Josh Bledsoe	Fr
LB	25	Khalil Jacobs	So
CB	26	Brian Dillard	So
LB	27	Gavin Forsha	Jr
S	28	Isaac Mason	Fr
DB	29	Wesley Miller	Fr
DL	30	Charles Coleman III	Sr
S	31	Mike Harris	Jr
LB	32	Blayne Myrick	So
CB	33	Alex Shamburger	Fr
CB	34	Jordan Buchanan	Fr
OLB	35	Nick Curtis	Jr
S	36	Cameron Rutledge	Jr
S	37	Karon Weary	Fr
OLB	39	Dalton Hughes	So
S	40	AJ Sims Jr.	Fr
LB	43	Taylor Milton	Jr
CB	44	Michael Archie	Fr
DL	45	Ed Smith IV	So
DL	46	Toshi Yamamoto	Fr
S	47	Eli Ntsasa	Jr
LB	48	Jordon Williams	Fr
LB	49	Logan Lewis	Fr
LB	53	Emauri Sibley	So
DL	55	Maurice Strong Jr.	Sr
DL	90	Carlos Johnson Jr.	Jr
DL	91	Nathan Rawlins-Kibonge	So
DL	95	Brock Higdon	Jr
OLB	96	Eli Webb	So
DL	97	Devery Smith	Jr
DL	99	Wy’Kevious Thomas	Jr

Special teams

Pos.	#	Name	Class
P	25	David Delgado	Jr
LS	28	Travis Drosos	Jr
K	31	Jacob Meeks	Sr
K	36	Diego Guajardo	Sr
K/P	40	Aleksi Pulkkinen	Fr
LS	42	Anthony Zaccaro	Jr
P	87	Jack Martin	Sr
LS	93	Baxter Turner	Fr
K	94	Hamilton DiBoyan	Fr

Head coach

- Kane Wommack (Southern Miss)

Coordinators/assistant coaches

- Major Applewhite (Texas)
  Offensive coordinator/qb
- Corey Batoon (Long Beach State)
  Defensive coordinator/s
- Antonio Bradford (Alabama State)
  Running backs
- Rob Ezell (Alabama)
  Tight ends
- Jay Hopson (Mississippi)
  Cornerbacks
- Matt Shadeed (Southern Miss)
  Assistant Head Coach/Director of Football Athletic Performance
- Michael Smith (Kansas State)
  Wide receivers
- Gordon Steele (LSU)
  Offensive linemen
- Landius Wilkerson (Tennessee Tech)
  Defensive linemen
- Tre' Williams (Auburn)
  Special teams coordinator/Defensive Assistant
- Will Windham (Mississippi State)
  Linebackers

Legend

- (C) Team captain
- (S) Suspended
- (I) Ineligible
- Injured
- Redshirt

Roster

== Schedule ==
The football schedule was announced February 24, 2023.

Date	Time	Opponent	Site	TV	Result	Attendance
September 2	7:00 p.m.	at No. 24 Tulane*	Yulman Stadium; New Orleans, LA	ESPNU	L 17–37	26,973
September 9	4:00 p.m.	No. 16 FCS Southeastern Louisiana*	Hancock Whitney Stadium; Mobile, AL	ESPN+	W 35–17	15,237
September 16	6:00 p.m.	at Oklahoma State*	Boone Pickens Stadium; Stillwater, OK	ESPN+	W 33–7	53,855
September 23	4:00 p.m.	Central Michigan*^{†}	Hancock Whitney Stadium; Mobile, AL	ESPN+	L 30–34	18,369
September 30	11:00 a.m.	at James Madison	Bridgeforth Stadium; Harrisonburg, VA	ESPNU	L 23–31	26,064
October 7	6:00 p.m.	at Louisiana–Monroe	Malone Stadium; Monroe, LA	ESPN+	W 55–7	12,099
October 17	6:30 p.m.	Southern Miss	Hancock Whitney Stadium; Mobile, AL	ESPN2	W 55–3	23,478
October 28	4:00 p.m.	Louisiana	Hancock Whitney Stadium; Mobile, AL	ESPN+	L 20–33	16,709
November 2	6:30 p.m.	at Troy	Veterans Memorial Stadium; Troy, AL (rivalry)	ESPN2	L 10–28	28,212
November 11	4:00 p.m.	Arkansas State	Hancock Whitney Stadium; Mobile, AL	ESPN+	W 21–14	15,242
November 18	4:00 p.m.	Marshall	Hancock Whitney Stadium; Mobile, AL	ESPN+	W 28–0	14,105
November 25	6:00 p.m.	at Texas State	Bobcat Stadium; San Marcos, TX	NFLN	L 44–52	15,617
December 23	6:00 p.m.	Eastern Michigan*	Hancock Whitney Stadium; Mobile, AL (68 Ventures Bowl)	ESPN	W 59–10	20,926
*Non-conference game; ^{†}Homecoming; Rankings from AP Poll and CFP Rankings released prior to game; All times are in Central time

== Game summaries ==
=== At No. 24 Tulane ===
South Alabama Jaguars (0–0) at No. 24 Tulane Green Wave (0–0)

Quarter	1	2	3	4	Total
Jaguars	0	10	7	0	17
No. 24 Green Wave	10	14	7	6	37

at Yulman Stadium, New Orleans, LA

- Date: September 2, 2023
- Game time: 7:00 p.m. CDT
- Game weather: Cloudy • Temperature: 81 °F (27 °C) • Wind: E 8 mph
- Game attendance: 26,973
- Referee: Kevin Randall
- TV announcers (ESPNU): John Schriffen (play-by-play), Rocky Boiman (color), Dawn Davenport (sideline)

Game information

First Quarter

- (13:09) TUL – Chris Brazzell II 4-yard pass from Michael Pratt, Valentino Ambrosio kick (Drive: 3 plays, 38 yards, 1:21; Tulane 7–0)
- (2:40) TUL – Valentino Ambrosio 29-yard field goal (Drive: 10 plays, 54 yards, 5:40; Tulane 10–0)

Second Quarter

- (11:54) USA – Carter Bradley 4-yard run, Diego Guajardo kick (Drive: 11 plays, 75 yards, 5:46; Tulane 7–10)
- (10:34) TUL – Jha'Quan Jackson 47-yard pass from Michael Pratt, Valentino Ambrosio kick (Drive: 3 plays, 75 yards, 1:20; Tulane 7–17)
- (7:39) TUL – Lawrence Keys III 47-yard pass from Michael Pratt, Valentino Ambrosio kick (Drive: 2 plays, 53 yards, 0:30; Tulane 7–24)
- (1:39) USA – Diego Guajardo 36-yard field goal (Drive: 4 plays, -6 yards, 0:57; Tulane 10–24)

Third Quarter

- (7:12) USA – Devin Voisin 7-yard pass from Carter Bradley, Diego Guajardo kick (Drive: 11 plays, 53 yards, 5:44; Tulane 17–24)
- (4:27) TUL – Jha'Quan Jackson 48-yard pass from Michael Pratt, Valentino Ambrosio kick (Drive: 5 plays, 75 yards, 2:45; Tulane 17–31)

Fourth Quarter

- (8:37) TUL – Valentino Ambrosio 30-yard field goal (Drive: 7 plays, 31 yards, 3:57; Tulane 17–34)
- (8:37) TUL – Valentino Ambrosio 27-yard field goal (Drive: 7 plays, 16 yards, 4:38; Tulane 17–37)

Win Probability

Line

Over/Under

Statistics	USA	TUL
First downs	18	16
Total yards	265	436
Rushing yards	75	142
Passing yards	190	294
Passing: Comp–Att–Int	23–30–2	14–15–0
Time of possession	29:23	30:37

Team	Category	Player	Statistics
South Alabama	Passing	Carter Bradley	23/30, 190 yards, TD, 2 INT
South Alabama	Rushing	La'Damian Webb	9 carries, 40 yards
South Alabama	Receiving	Jamaal Pritchett	5 receptions, 63 yards
Tulane	Passing	Michael Pratt	14/15, 294 yards, 4 TD
Tulane	Rushing	Makhi Hughes	8 carries, 41 yards
Tulane	Receiving	Jha'Quan Jackson	3 receptions, 106 yards, 2 TD

=== No. 16 (FCS) Southeastern Louisiana ===
Southeastern Louisiana Lions (0–1) at South Alabama Jaguars (0–1)

Quarter	1	2	3	4	Total
No. 16 (FCS) Lions	0	7	0	10	17
Jaguars	0	7	14	14	35

at Hancock Whitney Stadium, Mobile, AL

- Date: September 9, 2023
- Game time: 4:00 p.m. CDT
- Game weather: Sunny • Temperature: 92 °F (33 °C) • Wind: S 4 mph
- Game attendance: 15,237
- Referee: Trennis Livingston
- TV announcers (ESPN+): JD Byars (play-by-play) and Pat Greenwood (analyst)

Game information

First Quarter

None

Second Quarter

- (5:26) SLU – Ivan Drobocky 4-yard pass from Zachary Clement, Riley Callaghan kick (Drive: 12 plays, 93 yards, 7:18; Southeastern Louisiana 7–0)
- (4:02) USA – La'Damian Webb 2-yard run, Jacob Meeks kick (Drive: 4 plays, 75 yards, 1:23; Tied 7–7)

Third Quarter

- (8:50) USA – La'Damian Webb 13-yard run, Jacob Meeks kick (Drive: 7 plays, 74 yards, 3:10; South Alabama 14–7)
- (3:52) USA – Kentrel Bullock 8-yard run, Diego Guajardo kick (Drive: 9 plays, 61 yards, 3:52; South Alabama 21–7)

Fourth Quarter

- (14:44) USA – Caullin Lacy 84-yard pass from Carter Bradley, Diego Guajardo kick (Drive: 3 plays, 89 yards, 1:11; South Alabama 28–7)
- (12:09) SLU – Riley Callaghan 29-yard field goal (Drive: 5 plays, 76 yards, 2:28; South Alabama 28–10)
- (3:28) USA – Marco Lee Jr. 13-yard run, Diego Guajardo kick (Drive: 14 plays, 75 yards, 8:41; South Alabama 35–10)
- (0:41) SLU – Harlan Dixon 1-yard run, Riley Callaghan kick (Drive: 8 plays, 80 yards, 2:37; South Alabama 35–17)

Win Probability

Line

Over/Under

Statistics	SELA	USA
First downs	20	23
Total yards	412	509
Rushing yards	62	248
Passing yards	350	261
Passing: Comp–Att–Int	25–36–1	20–27–1
Time of possession	31:51	28:09

Team	Category	Player	Statistics
Southeastern Louisiana	Passing	Zachary Clement	18/24, 267 yards, TD, INT
Southeastern Louisiana	Rushing	Rodeo Graham Jr.	8 carries, 33 yards
Southeastern Louisiana	Receiving	Darius Lewis	7 receptions, 81 yards
South Alabama	Passing	Carter Bradley	19/26, 258 yards, TD, INT
South Alabama	Rushing	Kentrel Bullock	14 carries, 82 yards, TD
South Alabama	Receiving	Caullin Lacy	8 receptions, 139 yards, TD

=== At Oklahoma State ===
South Alabama Jaguars (1–1) at Oklahoma State Cowboys (2–0)

Quarter	1	2	3	4	Total
Jaguars	10	13	0	10	33
Cowboys	0	0	0	7	7

at Boone Pickens Stadium, Stillwater, OK

- Date: September 16, 2023
- Game time: 6:00 p.m. CDT
- Game weather: Cloudy, 78 °F (26 °C)
- Game attendance: 53,855
- Referee: Kyle Olson
- TV announcers (ESPN+): Drew Carter (play-by-play) & Dustin Fox (analyst)

Game information

First Quarter

- (6:18) USA – Diego Guajardo 39 yard field goal (Drive: 14 plays, 68 yards, 6:46; USA 3–0)
- (1:01) USA – Caullin Lacy 39 yard pass from Carter Bradley, Diego Guajardo kick (Drive: 8 plays, 70 yards, 4:18; USA 10–0)

Second Quarter

- (14:44) USA – La'Damian Webb 17 yard rush, XP Kick failed (Drive: 1 play, 17 yards, 0:06; USA 16–0)
- (01:03) USA – Caullin Lacy 57 yard pass from Carter Bradley, Diego Guajardo kick (Drive: 3 plays, 59 yards, 1:00; USA 23–0)

Third Quarter

- No Score

Fourth Quarter

- (12:14) OSU – Jaden Nixon 2 yard rush, Alex Hale kick (Drive: 17 plays, 84 yards, 6:09; USA 23–7)
- (9:04) USA – Diego Guajardo 42 yard field goal (Drive: 4 plays, 0 yards, 1:33; USA 26–7)
- (7:04) USA – La'Damian Webb 65 yard rush, Diego Guajardo kick (Drive: 2 plays, 67 yards, 0:52; USA 33–7)

Win Probability

Line

Over/Under

Statistics	USA	OKST
First downs	18	14
Total yards	395	208
Rushes/yards	47/243	29/94
Passing yards	152	114
Passing: Comp–Att–Int	10–16	16–35–1
Time of possession	34:35	25:20

Team	Category	Player	Statistics
South Alabama	Passing	Carter Bradley	10/15, 152 yards, 2 TD's
South Alabama	Rushing	La'Damian Webb	18 carries, 151 yards, 2 TD's
South Alabama	Receiving	Caullin Lacy	5 receptions, 104 yards, 2 TD's
Oklahoma State	Passing	Gunnar Gundy	9/18, 64 yards
Oklahoma State	Rushing	Elijah Collins	9 carries, 31 yards
Oklahoma State	Receiving	Jaden Bray	5 receptions, 42 yards

=== Central Michigan ===
Central Michigan Chippewas (1–2) at South Alabama Jaguars (2–1)

Quarter	1	2	3	4	Total
Chippewas	0	13	7	14	34
Jaguars	14	0	3	13	30

at Hancock Whitney Stadium, Mobile, AL

- Date: September 23, 2023
- Game time: 4:00 p.m. CDT
- Game weather: Sunny • Temperature: 90 °F (32 °C) • Wind: SW 5 mph
- Game attendance: 18,369
- Referee: Marshall Lewis
- TV: ESPN+

Game information

First Quarter

- (9:02) USA – La'Damian Webb 3-yard run, Diego Guajardo kick (Drive: 9 plays, 75 yards, 3:38; South Alabama 7–0)
- (4:23) USA – Caullin Lacy 35-yard pass from Carter Bradley, Diego Guajardo kick (Drive: 6 plays, 71 yards, 2:37; South Alabama 14–0)

Second Quarter

- (13:37) CMU – Jase Bauer 15-yard run, Tristan Mattson kick (Drive: 11 plays, 75 yards, 5:46; South Alabama 14–7)
- (4:13) CMU – Jase Bauer 1-yard run (Drive: 14 plays, 69 yards, 7:41; South Alabama 14–13)

Third Quarter

- (8:31) CMU – Jase Bauer 1-yard run, Tristan Mattson kick (Drive: 10 plays, 56 yards, 5:35; Central Michigan 20–14)
- (0:53) USA – Diego Guajardo 32-yard field goal (Drive: 12 plays, 61 yards, 5:45; Central Michigan 20–17)

Fourth Quarter

- (14:47) CMU – Jesse Prewitt III 70-yard pass from Jase Bauer, Tristan Mattson kick (Drive: 3 plays, 75 yards, 1:06; Central Michigan 27–17)
- (13:27) USA – Caullin Lacy 72-yard pass from Carter Bradley (Drive: 3 plays, 75 yards, 1:20; Central Michigan 27–23)
- (2:42) USA – La'Damian Webb 1-yard run, Diego Guajardo kick (Drive: 8 plays, 59 yards, 3:27; South Alabama 30–27)
- (0:13) CMU – Jase Bauer 4-yard run, Tristan Mattson kick (Drive: 11 plays, 75 yards, 2:29; Central Michigan 34–30)

Win Probability

Line

Over/Under

Statistics	CMU	USA
First downs	19	19
Total yards	355	405
Rushing yards	8	8
Passing yards	8	10
Passing: Comp–Att–Int	20–31–0	17–27–0
Time of possession	33:44	26:16

Team	Category	Player	Statistics
Central Michigan	Passing	Jase Bauer	19/30, 224 yards, TD
Central Michigan	Rushing	Jase Bauer	15 carries, 55 yards, 4 TD
Central Michigan	Receiving	Jesse Prewitt III	10 receptions, 142 yards, TD
South Alabama	Passing	Carter Bradley	17/27, 254 yards, 2 TD
South Alabama	Rushing	La'Damian Webb	18 carries, 68 yards, 2 TD
South Alabama	Receiving	Caullin Lacy	6 receptions, 132 yards, 2 TD

=== At James Madison ===
South Alabama Jaguars (2–2) at James Madison Dukes (4–0)

Quarter	1	2	3	4	Total
Jaguars	0	7	3	13	23
Dukes	14	10	0	7	31

at Bridgeforth Stadium, Harrisonburg, VA

- Date: September 30, 2023
- Game time: 11:00 a.m. CDT
- Game weather: Sunny
- Game attendance: 26,064
- Referee: Trennis Livingston
- TV announcers (ESPNU): Courtney Lyle (play-by-play) and Hutson Mason (analyst)

Game information

First Quarter

- (12:49) JMU – Elijah Sarratt 48-yard pass from Jordan McCloud, Camden Wise kick (Drive: 3 plays, 48 yards, 0:22; James Madison 7–0)
- (8:04) JMU – Zach Horton 44-yard pass from Jordan McCloud, Camden Wise kick (Drive: 1 plays, 44 yards, 0:11; James Madison 14–0)

Second Quarter

- (6:10) JMU – Camden Wise 31-yard field goal (Drive: 9 plays, 70 yards, 3:56; James Madison 17–0)
- (5:37) USA – Jamaal Pritchett 48-yard pass from Carter Bradley, Diego Guajardo kick (Drive: 2 plays, 70 yards, 0:29; James Madison 17–7)
- (3:49) JMU – Jalen Green 24-yard interception, Camden Wise kick (Drive: James Madison 24–7)

Third Quarter

- (0:21) USA – Diego Guajardo 40-yard field goal (Drive: 10 plays, 51 yards, 4:37; James Madison 24–10)

Fourth Quarter

- (11:32) JMU – Zach Horton 66-yard pass from Jordan McCloud, Camden Wise kick (Drive: 2 plays, 71 yards, 0:49; James Madison 31–10)
- (8:19) USA – Lincoln Sefcik 3-yard pass from Carter Bradley (Drive: 9 plays, 75 yards, 3:13; James Madison 31–16)
- (3:56) USA – La'Damian Webb 1-yard run, Diego Guajardo kick (Drive: 7 plays, 89 yards, 1:48; James Madison 31–23)

Win Probability

Line

Over/Under

Statistics	USA	JMU
First downs	20	15
Total yards	326	377
Rushing yards	3	7
Passing yards	12	6
Passing: Comp–Att–Int	28–50–2	12–22–1
Time of possession	28:46	31:14

Team	Category	Player	Statistics
South Alabama	Passing	Carter Bradley	28/50, 299 yards, 2 TD, 2 INT
South Alabama	Rushing	La'Damian Webb	12 carries, 36 yards, TD
South Alabama	Receiving	Caullin Lacy	6 receptions, 132 yards
James Madison	Passing	Jordan McCloud	12/22, 241 yards, 3 TD, INT
James Madison	Rushing	Jordan McCloud	10 carries, 61 yards
James Madison	Receiving	Zach Horton	3 receptions, 116 yards, 2 TD

=== At Louisiana–Monroe ===
South Alabama Jaguars (2–3) at Louisiana–Monroe Warhawks (2–2)

Quarter	1	2	3	4	Total
Jaguars	14	17	14	10	55
Warhawks	0	7	0	0	7

at Malone Stadium, Monroe, LA

- Date: October 7, 2023
- Game time: 6:00 p.m. CDT
- Game weather: Clear • Temperature: 70 °F (21 °C) • Wind: N 12 mph
- Game attendance: 12,099
- Referee: Scott Broadway
- TV announcers (ESPN+): Chris Harris (play-by-play) and Tag Rome (analyst)

Game information

First Quarter

- (10:57) USA – Kentrel Bullock 5-yard run, Diego Guajardo kick (Drive: 10 plays, 75 yards, 4:03; South Alabama 7–0)
- (6:29) USA – Brandon Crum 3-yard pass from Carter Bradley, Diego Guajardo kick (Drive: 8 plays, 45 yards, 3:44; South Alabama 14–0)

Second Quarter

- (13:55) USA – Diego Guajardo 37-yard field goal (Drive: 15 plays, 38 yards, 6:29; South Alabama 17–0)
- (9:57) USA – Caullin Lacy 44-yard pass from Carter Bradley, Diego Guajardo kick (Drive: 2 plays, 46 yards, 0:38; South Alabama 24–0)
- (1:23) USA – Marco Lee Jr. 10-yard run, Diego Guajardo kick (Drive: 7 plays, 76 yards, 3:32; South Alabama 31–0)
- (0:00) ULM – Tyrone Howell 14-yard pass from Jiya Wright, Derek McCormick kick (Drive: 11 plays, 75 yards, 1:23; South Alabama 31–7)

Third Quarter

- (4:46) USA – La'Damian Webb 1-yard run, Diego Guajardo kick (Drive: 8 plays, 58 yards, 2:51; South Alabama 38–7)
- (1:23) USA – Kentrel Bullock 30-yard pass from Carter Bradley, Diego Guajardo kick (Drive: 6 plays, 68 yards, 2:10; South Alabama 45–7)

Fourth Quarter

- (10:33) USA – Diego Guajardo 46-yard field goal (Drive: 7 plays, 31 yards, 3:11; South Alabama 48–7)
- (1:20) USA – Jeremiah Webb 3-yard pass from Gio Lopez, Diego Guajardo kick (Drive: 13 plays, 80 yards, 5:56; South Alabama 55–7)

Win Probability

Line

Over/Under

Statistics	USA	ULM
First downs	32	13
Total yards	589	250
Rushing yards	14	5
Passing yards	18	6
Passing: Comp–Att–Int	27–39–0	13–28–2
Time of possession	36:30	23:30

Team	Category	Player	Statistics
South Alabama	Passing	Carter Bradley	20/29, 303 yards, 3 TD
South Alabama	Rushing	La'Damian Webb	19 carries, 100 yards, TD
South Alabama	Receiving	Caullin Lacy	7 receptions, 156 yards, TD
Louisiana–Monroe	Passing	Jiya Wright	13/28, 112 yards, TD, 2 INT
Louisiana–Monroe	Rushing	Jiya Wright	13 carries, 53 yards
Louisiana–Monroe	Receiving	Tyrone Howell	4 receptions, 41 yards

=== vs Southern Miss ===
Southern Miss Golden Eagles (1–5) at South Alabama Jaguars (3–3)

Quarter	1	2	3	4	Total
Golden Eagles	0	0	3	0	3
Jaguars	14	17	17	7	55

at Hancock Whitney Stadium • Mobile, AL

- Date: Tuesday, October 17, 2023
- Game time: 6:30 p.m. CST
- Game weather: Clear • Temperature: 53 °F (12 °C)
- Game attendance: 23,478
- Referee: Trennis Livingston
- TV announcers (ESPN2): Clay Matvick (play-by-play), Aaron Murray (analyst), Lauren Sisler (sideline)

Game information

First quarter

- (11:07) USA – La'Damian Webb 5-yard run (Diego Guajardo kick) (Drive: 10 plays, 75 yards, 3:53; South Alabama 7-0)
- (4:17) USA – La'Damian Webb 3-yard run (Diego Guajardo kick) (Drive: 11 plays, 85 yards, 4:36; South Alabama 14-0)

Second quarter

- (10:30) USA – La'Damian Webb 5-yard run (Diego Guajardo kick) (Drive: 14 plays, 80 yards, 6:48; South Alabama 21-0)
- (7:03) USA – Kentrel Bullock 17-yard run (Diego Guajardo kick) (Drive: 6 plays, 51 yards, 2:13; South Alabama 28-0)
- (0:45) USA – Diego Guajardo 23-yard field goal (Drive: 8 plays, 65 yards, 3:44; South Alabama 31-0)

Third quarter

- (10:05) USA – Diego Guajardo 39-yard field goal (Drive: 10 plays, 47 yards, 2:58; South Alabama 34-0)
- (5:40) USM – Andrew Stein 32-yard field goal (Drive: 10 plays, 61 yards, 4:22; South Alabama 34-3)
- (4:41) USA – La'Damian Webb 16-yard run (Diego Guajardo kick) (Drive: 3 plays, 60 yards, 0:53; South Alabama 41-3)
- (1:20) USA – Dorian Smith 29-yard run (Diego Guajardo kick) (Drive: 3 plays, 62 yards, 1:05; South Alabama 48-3)

Fourth quarter

- (13:47) USA – Gio Lopez 20-yard run (Diego Guajardo kick) (Drive: 3 plays, 31 yards, 0:58; South Alabama 55-3)

Statistics	USM	USA
First downs	12	34
Total yards	56–149	75–647
Rushing yards	36–103	44–287
Passing yards	46	360
Passing: Comp–Att–Int	7–20–1	23–31–1
Time of possession	28:45	31:15

Team	Category	Player	Statistics
Southern Miss	Passing	Holman Edwards	5/15, 41 yards, INT
Southern Miss	Rushing	Kenyon Clay	10 carries, 60 yards
Southern Miss	Receiving	Frank Gore Jr.	2 receptions, 22 yards
South Alabama	Passing	Carter Bradley	21/27, 319 yards
South Alabama	Rushing	La'Damian Webb	20 carries, 102 yards, 4 TD
South Alabama	Receiving	Jamaal Pritchett	5 receptions, 122 yards

=== Louisiana ===
Louisiana Ragin' Cajuns (4–3) at South Alabama Jaguars (4–3)

Quarter	1	2	3	4	Total
Ragin' Cajuns	0	17	16	0	33
Jaguars	0	0	14	6	20

at Hancock Whitney Stadium, Mobile, AL

- Date: October 28, 2023
- Game time: 4:00 p.m. CDT
- Game weather: Cloudy • Temperature: 81 °F (27 °C) • Wind: N 6 mph
- Game attendance: 16,709
- Referee: Wayne Winkler
- TV announcers (ESPN+): Pat Greenwood (play-by-play) and Nick Mobley (analyst)

Game information

First Quarter

None

Second Quarter

- (12:58) LA – Jacob Bernard 33-yard pass from Zeon Chriss, Kenneth Almendares kick (Drive: 12 plays, 93 yards, 6:44; Louisiana 7–0)
- (8:15) LA – Neal Johnson 3-yard pass from Zeon Chriss, Kenneth Almendares kick (Drive: 7 plays, 41 yards, 3:32; Louisiana 14–0)
- (2:10) LA – Kenneth Almendares 20-yard field goal (Drive: 9 plays, 34 yards, 4:03; Louisiana 17–0)

Third Quarter

- (11:53) USA – Jamaal Pritchett 6-yard pass from Carter Bradley, Diego Guajardo kick (Drive: 9 plays, 80 yards, 3:00; Louisiana 17–7)
- (7:32) LA – Kenneth Almendares 42-yard field goal (Drive: 9 plays, 50 yards, 4:21; Louisiana 20–7)
- (6:09) USA – La'Damian Webb 25-yard run, Diego Guajardo kick (Drive: 3 plays, 89 yards, 1:19; Louisiana 20–14)
- (3:17) LA – Jacob Kibodi 56-yard run (Drive: 5 plays, 75 yards, 2:52; Louisiana 26–14)
- (1:07) LA – Kendre' Gant 55-yard fumble recovery, Kenneth Almendares kick (Drive: Louisiana 33–14)

Fourth Quarter

- (0:16) USA – Jamaal Pritchett 39-yard pass from Carter Bradley (Drive: 6 plays, 58 yards, 0:58; Louisiana 33–20)

Win Probability

Line

- USA –11

Over/Under

- 55.5

Statistics	ULL	USA
First downs	19	25
Total yards	348	498
Rushing yards	203	117
Passing yards	145	381
Passing: Comp–Att–Int	13–17–0	29–49–2
Time of possession	34:44	25:16

Team	Category	Player	Statistics
Louisiana	Passing	Zeon Chriss	13/17, 145 yards, 2 TD
Louisiana	Rushing	Jacob Kibodi	23 carries, 119 yards, TD
Louisiana	Receiving	Peter LeBlanc	2 receptions, 37 yards
South Alabama	Passing	Carter Bradley	29/49, 381 yards, 2 TD, 2 INT
South Alabama	Rushing	La'Damian Webb	16 carries, 96 yards, TD
South Alabama	Receiving	Jamaal Pritchett	11 receptions, 168 yards, 2 TD

=== At Troy ===
South Alabama Jaguars (4–4) at Troy Trojans (6–2)

Quarter	1	2	3	4	Total
Jaguars	7	0	0	3	10
Trojans	0	14	0	14	28

at Veterans Memorial Stadium, Troy, AL

- Date: November 2, 2023
- Game time: 6:30 p.m. CDT
- Game weather: Sunny • Temperature: 55 °F (13 °C) • Wind: SW 4 mph
- Game attendance: 28,212
- Referee: Jeremy Parker
- TV announcers (ESPN2): Lowell Galindo (play-by-play) and Tom Luginbill (analyst)

Game information

First Quarter

- (10:13) USA – La'Damian Webb 6-yard run, Diego Guajardo kick (Drive: 5 plays, 44 yards, 1:45; South Alabama 7–0)

Second Quarter

- (11:30) TRO – Chris Lewis 47-yard pass from Gunnar Watson, Scott Taylor Renfroe kick (Drive: 4 plays, 68 yards, 2:04; Tied 7–7)
- (0:19) TRO – Chris Lewis 26-yard pass from Gunnar Watson, Scott Taylor Renfroe kick (Drive: 12 plays, 96 yards, 5:15; Troy 14–7)

Third Quarter

None

Fourth Quarter

- (11:47) USA – Diego Guajardo 29-yard field goal (Drive: 11 plays, 56 yards, 5:29; Troy 14–10)
- (3:12) TRO – Kimani Vidal 1-yard run, Scott Taylor Renfroe kick (Drive: 16 plays, 75 yards, 8:35; Troy 21–10)
- (1:48) TRO – Chris Lewis 29-yard pass from Gunnar Watson, Scott Taylor Renfroe kick (Drive: 4 plays, 32 yards, 1:03; Troy 28–10)

Win Probability

Line

Over/Under

Statistics	USA	TROY
First downs	15	21
Total yards	252	400
Rushing yards	97	129
Passing yards	155	271
Passing: Comp–Att–Int	17–27–1	19–27–0
Time of possession	25:22	34:38

Team	Category	Player	Statistics
South Alabama	Passing	Gio Lopez	17/27, 155 yards, INT
South Alabama	Rushing	La'Damian Webb	15 carries, 53 yards, TD
South Alabama	Receiving	Caullin Lacy	9 receptions, 89 yards
Troy	Passing	Gunnar Watson	19/27, 271 yards, 3 TD
Troy	Rushing	Kimani Vidal	24 carries, 125 yards, TD
Troy	Receiving	Chris Lewis	4 receptions, 120 yards, 3 TD

=== Arkansas State ===
Arkansas State Red Wolves (5–4) at South Alabama Jaguars (4–5)

Quarter	1	2	3	4	Total
Red Wolves	3	0	3	8	14
Jaguars	7	7	7	0	21

at Hancock Whitney Stadium, Mobile, AL

- Date: November 11, 2023
- Game time: 4:00 p.m. CDT
- Game weather: Cloudy • Temperature: 69 °F (21 °C) • Wind: S 7 mph
- Game attendance: 15,242
- Referee: Tedd Pitts
- TV announcers (ESPN+): Pat Greenwood (play-by-play) and Charlie Harrison (analyst)

Game information

First Quarter

- (9:18) ASU – Dominic Zvada 36-yard field goal (Drive: 10 plays, 53 yards, 4:11; Arkansas State 3–0)
- (7:21) USA – La'Damian Webb 13-yard run, Diego Guajardo kick (Drive: 4 plays, 75 yards, 1:57; South Alabama 7–3)

Second Quarter

- (0:07) USA – Jamaal Pritchett 20-yard pass from Carter Bradley, Diego Guajardo kick (Drive: 14 plays, 78 yards, 5:44; South Alabama 14–3)

Third Quarter

- (12:55) ASU – Dominic Zvada 44-yard field goal (Drive: 6 plays, 49 yards, 2:05; South Alabama 14–6)

Fourth Quarter

- (8:01) USA – Jamaal Pritchett 24-yard pass from Carter Bradley, Diego Guajardo kick (Drive: 8 plays, 53 yards, 4:40; South Alabama 21–6)
- (3:39) ASU – Jeff Foreman 46-yard pass from Jaylen Raynor, Jaylen Raynor rush (Drive: 7 plays, 81 yards, 2:15; South Alabama 21–14)

Win Probability

Line

Over/Under

Statistics	ARST	USA
First downs	19	15
Total yards	302	344
Rushing yards	116	199
Passing yards	186	145
Passing: Comp–Att–Int	15–28–1	19–25–0
Time of possession	27:08	32:52

Team	Category	Player	Statistics
Arkansas State	Passing	Jaylen Raynor	15/28, 186 yards, TD, INT
Arkansas State	Rushing	Zak Wallace	11 carries, 56 yards
Arkansas State	Receiving	Jeff Foreman	3 receptions, 61 yards, TD
South Alabama	Passing	Carter Bradley	19/25, 145 yards, 2 TD
South Alabama	Rushing	La'Damian Webb	28 carries, 163 yards, TD
South Alabama	Receiving	Caullin Lacy	7 receptions, 50 yards

=== Marshall ===
Marshall Thundering Herd (5–5) at South Alabama Jaguars (5–5)

Quarter	1	2	3	4	Total
Thundering Herd	0	0	0	0	0
Jaguars	14	7	0	7	28

at Hancock Whitney Stadium, Mobile, AL

- Date: November 18, 2023
- Game time: 4:00 p.m. CDT
- Game weather: Sunny • Temperature: 71 °F (22 °C) • Wind: S 8 mph
- Game attendance: 14,105
- Referee: Marshall Lewis
- TV announcers (ESPN+): Pat Greenwood (play-by-play) and Charlie Harrison (analyst)

Game information

First Quarter

- (10:37) USA – Diego Guajardo 47-yard field goal (Drive: 7 plays, 22 yards, 3:00; South Alabama 3–0)
- (8:38) USA – Diego Guajardo 43-yard field goal (Drive: 4 plays, 6 yards, 1:22; South Alabama 6–0)
- (5:02) USA – Jamaal Pritchett 25-yard pass from Carter Bradley, La'Damian Webb pass (Drive: 4 plays, 51 yards, 1:49; South Alabama 14–0)

Second Quarter

- (3:19) USA – La'Damian Webb 8-yard pass from Carter Bradley, Diego Guajardo kick (Drive: 6 plays, 50 yards, 3:04; South Alabama 21–0)

Third Quarter

None

Fourth Quarter

- (10:15) USA – La'Damian Webb 6-yard run, Diego Guajardo kick (Drive: 6 plays, 54 yards, 3:51; South Alabama 28–0)

Win Probability

- South Alabama

Line

- –10.5

Over/Under

Statistics	MRSH	USA
First downs	10	20
Total yards	201	393
Rushing yards	42	197
Passing yards	159	196
Passing: Comp–Att–Int	22–36–3	19–26–0
Time of possession	23:33	36:27

Team	Category	Player	Statistics
Marshall	Passing	Cole Pennington	22/36, 159 yards, 3 INT
Marshall	Rushing	Rasheen Ali	16 carries, 55 yards
Marshall	Receiving	Rasheen Ali	4 receptions, 41 yards
South Alabama	Passing	Carter Bradley	17/23, 176 yards, 2 TD
South Alabama	Rushing	La'Damian Webb	24 carries, 117 yards, TD
South Alabama	Receiving	Caullin Lacy	9 receptions, 126 yards

=== At Texas State ===
South Alabama Jaguars (6–5) at Texas State Bobcats (6–5)

Quarter	1	2	3	4	Total
Jaguars	0	17	7	20	44
Bobcats	24	7	7	14	52

at Bobcat Stadium, San Marcos, TX

- Date: November 25, 2023
- Game time: 6:00 p.m. CDT
- Game weather: Cloudy • Temperature: 59 °F (15 °C) • Wind: NE 2 mph
- Game attendance: 15,617
- Referee: Javarro Edwards
- TV announcers (NFLN): Jason Ross Jr. and Tyoka Jackson

Game information

First Quarter

- (12:05) TXST – Kaleb Culp 31-yard fumble recovery, Mason Shipley kick (Drive: Texas State 7–0)
- (8:47) TXST – Ashtyn Hawkins 48-yard pass from TJ Finley, Mason Shipley kick (Drive: 6 plays, 73 yards, 1:39; Texas State 14–0)
- (3:38) TXST – Jahmyl Jeter 1-yard run, Mason Shipley (Drive: 9 plays, 79 yards, 3:09; Texas State 21–0)
- (1:05) TXST – Mason Shipley 28-yard field goal (Drive: 6 plays, 26 yards, 2:31; Texas State 24–0)

Second Quarter

- (14:08) USA – Javon Ivory 39-yard pass from Carter Bradley (Drive: 6 plays, 67 yards, 1:57; Texas State 24–6)
- (13:55) TXST – Kole Wilson 100-yard kickoff return, Mason Shipley kick (Drive: Texas State 31–6)
- (7:06) USA – Diego Guajardo 51-yard field goal (Drive: 4 plays, -4 yards, 0:48; Texas State 31–9)
- (0:08) USA – DJ Thomas-Jones 18-yard pass from Carter Bradley, DJ Thomas-Jones pass (Drive: 12 plays, 91 yards, 1:44; Texas State 31–24)

Third Quarter

- (6:41) USA – DJ Thomas-Jones 1-yard pass from Desmond Trotter, Diego Guajardo kick (Drive: 7 plays, 83 yards, 3:07; Texas State 31–24)
- (3:35) TXST – Donerio Davenport 10-yard pass from TJ Finley, Mason Shipley kick (Drive: 7 plays, 75 yards, 3:06; Texas State 38–24)

Fourth Quarter

- (12:57) USA – Caullin Lacy 12-yard pass from Desmond Trotter (Drive: 3 plays, 28 yards, 1:15; Texas State 38–30)
- (11:31) TXST – Kole Wilson 24-yard pass from TJ Finley, Mason Shipley kick (Drive: 4 plays, 67 yards, 1:19; Texas State 45–30)
- (4:04) USA – DJ Thomas-Jones 3-yard pass from Desmond Trotter (Drive: 15 plays, 63 yards, 7:25; Texas State 45–36)
- (3:04) TXST – Ismail Mahdi 1-yard run, Mason Shipley kick (Drive: 4 plays, 43 yards, 0:57; Texas State 52–36)
- (1:02) USA – Jacob Hopper 5-yard pass from Desmond Trotter, Braylon McReynolds pass (Drive: 7 plays, 51 yards, 1:52; Texas State 52–44)

Win Probability

Line

Over/Under

Statistics	USA	TXST
First downs	26	22
Total yards	476	479
Rushing yards	77	111
Passing yards	399	368
Passing: Comp–Att–Int	36–45–1	19–28–1
Time of possession	31:15	28:45

Team	Category	Player	Statistics
South Alabama	Passing	Desmond Trotter	18/21, 216 yards, 4 TD, INT
South Alabama	Rushing	Braylon McReynolds	19 carries, 79 yards
South Alabama	Receiving	Caullin Lacy	11 receptions, 94 yards, TD
Texas State	Passing	T. J. Finley	19/28, 368 yards, 3 TD, INT
Texas State	Rushing	Ismail Mahdi	23 carries, 97 yards, TD
Texas State	Receiving	Ashtyn Hawkins	5 receptions, 131 yards, TD

=== Eastern Michigan (68 Ventures Bowl) ===
Eastern Michigan Eagles (6–6) vs. South Alabama Jaguars (6–6) (68 Ventures Bowl)

Quarter	1	2	3	4	Total
Jaguars	17	21	21	0	59
Eagles	0	3	0	7	10

at Hancock Whitney Stadium • Mobile, Alabama

- Date: December 23, 2023
- Game time: 6:00 p.m. CST
- Game weather: Cloudy • Temperature: 64 °F (18 °C) • Wind: 4 mph (6.4 km/h) SE
- Game attendance: 20,926
- Referee: Cal McNeill
- TV announcers (ESPN): Taylor Zarzour (play-by-play), Matt Stinchcomb (analyst), and Alyssa Lang (sideline)
- Box score

Game information

First Quarter

- (10:50) USA – Diego Guajardo 46 yard field goal (Drive: 11 plays, 55 yards, 4:10; South Alabama 3–0)
- (7:37) USA – DJ Thomas-Jones 3 yard pass from Desmond Trotter, Diego Guajardo kick (Drive: 5 plays, 63 yards, 2:19; South Alabama 10–0)
- (3:30) USA – Jamaal Pritchett 5 yard pass from Gio Lopez, Diego Guajardo kick (Drive: 6 plays, 65 yards, 2:38; South Alabama 17–0)

Second Quarter

- (14:50) EMU – Jesús Gómez 49 yard field goal (Drive: 4 plays, 4 yards, 1:10; South Alabama 17–3)
- (10:15) USA – Kentrel Bullock 17 yard run, Diego Guajardo kick (Drive: 8 plays, 62 yards, 4:35; South Alabama 24–3)
- (8:07) USA – DJ Thomas-Jones 20 yard pass from Gio Lopez, Diego Guajardo kick (Drive: 4 plays, 37 yards, 1:54; South Alabama 31–3)
- (1:39) USA – Jamaal Pritchett 42 yard pass from Gio Lopez, Diego Guajardo kick (Drive: 5 plays, 75 yards, 1:06; South Alabama 38–3)

Third Quarter

- (11:07) USA – Desmond Trotter 3 yard run, Diego Guajardo kick (Drive: 5 plays, 34 yards, 2:05; South Alabama 45–3)
- (7:50) USA – Gio Lopez 27 yard run, Diego Guajardo kick (Drive: 3 plays, 43 yards, 0:55; South Alabama 52–3)
- (2:07) USA – PJ Martin 6 yard run, Diego Guajardo kick (Drive: 8 plays, 74 yards, 3:31; South Alabama 59–3)

Fourth Quarter

- (0:58) EMU – Cam'Ron McCoy 10 yard run, Jesús Gómez kick (Drive: 13 plays, 70 yards, 7:27; South Alabama 59–10)

Following the game, an altercation took place on-field between the teams prior to the trophy presentation, initiated by an Eastern Michigan player sucker punching a South Alabama player while the South Alabama marching band and team were singing the school's alma mater. Eastern Michigan's athletic director apologized the next day, stating (in part) "We strongly condemn the actions of some of the student-athletes".

Statistics	USA	EMU
First downs	29	10
Total yards	627	150
Rushing yards	320	77
Passing yards	307	73
Passing: comp–att–int	23–36–1	12–30–2
Time of possession	30:53	29:07

Team	Category	Player	Statistics
South Alabama	Passing	Gio Lopez	14/19, 192 yards, 3 TD
South Alabama	Rushing	Gio Lopez	7 carries, 88 yards, TD
South Alabama	Receiving	Jamaal Pritchett	8 receptions, 127 yards, 2 TD
Eastern Michigan	Passing	Cam'Ron McCoy	12/27, 73 yards, 2 INT
Eastern Michigan	Rushing	Cam'Ron McCoy	13 carries, 73 yards, TD
Eastern Michigan	Receiving	Terry Lockett Jr.	2 receptions, 29 yards
