= 2022 South Alabama Jaguars football team =

American college football season

2022 South Alabama Jaguars football

Sun Belt West Division co-champion

New Orleans Bowl, L 23–44 vs. Western Kentucky
- Conference: Sun Belt Conference
- West Division
- Record: 10–3 (7–1 Sun Belt)
- Head coach: Kane Wommack (2nd season)
- Offensive coordinator: Major Applewhite (2nd season)
- Offensive scheme: Multiple spread
- Defensive coordinator: Corey Batoon (2nd season)
- Base defense: Multiple 4–2–5
- Home stadium: Hancock Whitney Stadium

2022 Sun Belt Conference football standings
	Conf.			Overall
Team	W		L	W		L
East Division
James Madison* x	6	–	2	8	–	3
Coastal Carolina xy	6	–	2	9	–	4
Marshall	5	–	3	9	–	4
Georgia Southern	3	–	5	6	–	7
Appalachian State	3	–	5	6	–	6
Georgia State	3	–	5	4	–	8
Old Dominion	2	–	6	3	–	9
West Division
No. 19 Troy xy$	7	–	1	12	–	2
South Alabama x	7	–	1	10	–	3
Southern Miss	4	–	4	7	–	6
Louisiana	4	–	4	6	–	7
Louisiana–Monroe	3	–	5	4	–	8
Texas State	2	–	6	4	–	8
Arkansas State	1	–	7	3	–	9
Championship: Troy 45, Coastal Carolina 26
$ – Conference champion; x – Division champion/co-champions; y – Championship game participant; * – Ineligible for postseason play due to FCS-to-FBS transition rules; Rankings from AP Poll

The 2022 South Alabama Jaguars football team represented the University of South Alabama as a member of the Sun Belt Conference during the 2022 NCAA Division I FBS football season. They were led by head coach Kane Wommack, who was coaching his second season with the team. The Jaguars played their home games at Hancock Whitney Stadium in Mobile, Alabama.

== Preseason ==
=== Recruiting class ===
College recruiting information
Name	Hometown	School	Height	Weight	40^{‡}	Commit date
D. K. Bonhomme; Edge	Ottawa, Ontario, Canada	Clearwater Academy International; Indiana	6 ft 3 in (1.91 m)	235 lb (107 kg)	–	Dec 14, 2021
D. K. Bonhomme; Edge	Recruit ratings: Rivals: 247Sports: ESPN: (78)					
Carter Bradley; QB	Jacksonville, FL	Providence HS; Toledo	6 ft 3 in (1.91 m)	210 lb (95 kg)	–	Dec 14, 2021
Carter Bradley; QB	Recruit ratings: Rivals: 247Sports: ESPN: (81)					
Chrystyile Caldwell; LB	Elba, AL	Elba HS	6 ft 0 in (1.83 m)	205 lb (93 kg)	–	Jul 29, 2021
Chrystyile Caldwell; LB	Recruit ratings: Rivals: 247Sports: ESPN: (73)					
Malachi Carney; OT	Pleasant Grove, AL	Pleasant Grove HS	6 ft 4 in (1.93 m)	265 lb (120 kg)	–	Dec 1, 2021
Malachi Carney; OT	Recruit ratings: Rivals: 247Sports: ESPN: (71)					
Chris Davis Jr. WR	Watson, LA	Live Oak HS	6 ft 0 in (1.83 m)	150 lb (68 kg)	–	Jul 31, 2021
Chris Davis Jr. WR	Recruit ratings: Rivals: 247Sports: ESPN:					
Ricky Fletcher; S	Durant, MS	Holmes County HS	6 ft 2 in (1.88 m)	175 lb (79 kg)	–	Jun 21, 2021
Ricky Fletcher; S	Recruit ratings: Rivals: 247Sports: ESPN: (73)					
Daniel Foster-Allen; DL	Mobile, AL	St. Paul's Episcopal School; Auburn	6 ft 4 in (1.93 m)	250 lb (110 kg)	–	Jan 15, 2022
Daniel Foster-Allen; DL	Recruit ratings: Rivals: 247Sports: ESPN: (79)					
Khalil Jacobs; LB	Niceville, FL	Niceville HS	6 ft 2 in (1.88 m)	210 lb (95 kg)	–	Dec 1, 2021
Khalil Jacobs; LB	Recruit ratings: Rivals: 247Sports: ESPN: (74)					
Kenton Jerido; IOL	Tuscaloosa, AL	Northridge HS	6 ft 3 in (1.91 m)	305 lb (138 kg)	–	Aug 7, 2021
Kenton Jerido; IOL	Recruit ratings: Rivals: 247Sports: ESPN: (71)					
Jalen Jordan; CB	Lake Cormorant, MS	Lake Cormorant HS; Ole Miss	5 ft 10 in (1.78 m)	185 lb (84 kg)	–	Jan 16, 2022
Jalen Jordan; CB	Recruit ratings: Rivals: 247Sports: ESPN: (74)					
Dontae Lucas; IOL	Overton, FL	IMG Academy; Florida State	6 ft 3 in (1.91 m)	340 lb (150 kg)	–	Jan 8, 2022
Dontae Lucas; IOL	Recruit ratings: Rivals: 247Sports: ESPN: (82)					
Braylon McReynolds; RB	Mobile, AL	McGill-Toolen Catholic HS	5 ft 9 in (1.75 m)	170 lb (77 kg)	–	Oct 18, 2021
Braylon McReynolds; RB	Recruit ratings: Rivals: 247Sports: ESPN: (72)					
James Miller; LB	Madison, FL	Armwood HS; Indiana	6 ft 2 in (1.88 m)	223 lb (101 kg)	–	Jan 10, 2022
James Miller; LB	Recruit ratings: Rivals: 247Sports: ESPN: (76)					
Blayne Myrick; LB	Fairhope, AL	Fairhope HS	6 ft 3 in (1.91 m)	215 lb (98 kg)	–	Jan 30, 2022
Blayne Myrick; LB	Recruit ratings: Rivals: ESPN:					
Jamar Richardson; WR	Aliceville, AL	Aliceville HS; Ole Miss	6 ft 0 in (1.83 m)	185 lb (84 kg)	–	Jan 13, 2022
Jamar Richardson; WR	Recruit ratings: Rivals: 247Sports: ESPN: (79)					
Marquise Robinson; CB	Crosby, MS	Wilkinson County HS; Southwest Mississippi CC	6 ft 2 in (1.88 m)	185 lb (84 kg)	–	Dec 11, 2021
Marquise Robinson; CB	Recruit ratings: Rivals: 247Sports: ESPN: (73)					
Caeleb Schlachter; WR	Clearwater, FL	Clearwater Academy International	6 ft 3.5 in (1.92 m)	200 lb (91 kg)	–	Aug 9, 2021
Caeleb Schlachter; WR	Recruit ratings: Rivals: 247Sports: ESPN: (72)					
Tremel States-Jones; CB	Clearwater, FL	Clearwater Academy International	6 ft 0 in (1.83 m)	190 lb (86 kg)	–	Aug 10, 2021
Tremel States-Jones; CB	Recruit ratings: Rivals: 247Sports: ESPN:					
La'Damian Webb; RB	Opelika, AL	Beauregard HS; Jones College	5 ft 8 in (1.73 m)	210 lb (95 kg)	–	Dec 15, 2021
La'Damian Webb; RB	Recruit ratings: Rivals: 247Sports: ESPN:					

=== Award watch lists ===
Listed in the order that they were released

==== Preseason ====
Award	Player	Position	Year
Allstate AFCA Good Works Team	Keith Gallmon	S	SR
Jim Thorpe Award	Darrell Luter Jr.	DB	SR
Bronko Nagurski Trophy	Darrell Luter Jr.	DB	SR
Ray Guy Award	Jack Brooks	P	JR
Wuerffel Trophy	Keith Gallmon	S	SR
Bednarik Award	Darrell Luter Jr.	DB	SR
Mannelly Award	Travis Drosos	LS	SO

=== Sun Belt coaches poll ===
The Sun Belt coaches poll was released on July 25, 2022. The Jaguars were picked to finish second in the West Division.

=== Sun Belt Preseason All-Conference teams ===
Offense

2nd team

- Jalen Wayne – Wide Receiver, SR

Defense

1st team

- Darrell Luter Jr. – Defensive Back, SR
- Keith Gallmon Jr. – Defensive Back, SR

== Personnel ==
2022 South Alabama Jaguars football team roster
Players
Coaches
Offense

Pos.	#	Name	Class
WR	0	Jalen Wayne	Sr
QB	1	Desmond Trotter	Jr
QB	2	Carter Bradley	Jr
RB	3	La'Damian Webb	Jr
WR	4	Caullin Lacy	So
WR	6	Jay’juan Townsend	So
TE	8	DJ Thomas-Jones	Jr
WR	9	Devin Voisin	So
QB	10	Tanner McGee	So
WR	11	Nae'Saan Dickerson	Fr
WR	13	Christian Wortham	Fr
RB	14	Braylon McReynolds	Fr
WR	15	Victor McClinton	Sr
WR	16	Christopher Davis Jr.	Fr
QB	17	Eli Gainey	So
WR	18	Keyshawn Woodyard	Fr
QB	19	JT McArdle	Fr
TE	20	Brandon Crum	Jr
RB	22	Omni Wells	GS
RB	23	Bryan Hill	Jr
RB	24	Damean Bivins	So
TE	25	Cooper Wilson	Fr
TE	27	Jacob Hopper	So
RB	29	Marco Lee	Jr
RB	34	Jonathan Carter	Fr
TE	44	Nick Ruggs	So
OL	51	Tyler Jernigan	Jr
OL	55	Donte Lucas	Jr
OL	59	Sam Williams	Fr
OL	64	Kenton Jerido	Fr
OL	65	Josh McCulloch	Jr
OL	66	Kole Payne	Fr
OL	67	Reggie Smith	Jr
OL	68	James Jackson	Sr
OL	69	Kent Foster	Sr
OL	70	Adrein Strickland	Fr
OL	71	James Robinson	So
OL	72	John Gill	So
OL	73	Daniel Foster-Allen	Fr
OL	74	Reid Gavin	Fr
OL	75	Damon Parr	Fr
OL	76	PJ Mixon	Sr
OL	77	Malachi Carney	Fr
OL	78	Trey Simpson	Jr
OL	79	Logan Lanicek	Fr
WR	81	Jeremiah Webb	So
WR	82	Parker Kahlert	So
WR	83	Yasir Berry	Jr
WR	84	Oakley Coleman	So
WR	85	Caeleb Schlachter	Fr
TE	86	Todd Justice	So
TE	88	Lincoln Sefcik	Jr
WR	89	Jamaal Pritchett	Fr

Defense

Pos.	#	Name	Class
S	0	Keith Gallmon Jr.	Sr
CB	1	Jalen Jordan	Jr
S	2	Jaden Voisin	So
ILB	3	A. J. Deshazor	Sr
LB	4	James Miller	Jr
CB	6	Jamar Richardson	Sr
CB	7	Marquise Robinson	So
S	8	Yam Banks	So
ILB	9	Ke’Shun Brown	So
ILB	10	Quentin Wilfawn	Sr
DL	11	Jamie Sheriff	Jr
DL	12	Jamall Hickbottom	So
S	13	CJ Thompson	Sr
OLB	14	CJ Rias	Jr
LB	15	Chrystyile Caldwell	Fr
DB	16	Marvin Martin	So
DL	17	Zeke Chapman	Sr
CB	18	Darrell Luter Jr.	Sr
CB	19	Dallas Gamble	So
DL	20	Lamondre Brooks	Fr
LB	21	D. K. Bonhomme	Jr
ILB	22	Trey Kiser	Jr
DB	23	Tremel States-Jones	Fr
DB	24	Ricky Fletcher	Fr
LB	25	Khalil Jacobs	Fr
CB	26	AJ Sims	Fr
CB	27	Isaac Mason	Fr
CB	28	Jason Brooks	Fr
S	29	Christopher Wallace Jr.	Fr
DL	30	Charles Coleman III	Jr
DB	31	Josh Reynolds	Fr
LB	32	Blayne Myrick	Fr
DL	33	Terry Perry	So
LB	34	Jordan Whitely	Fr
DL	35	Nick Curtis	So
S	36	Trey Nelms	Fr
CB	37	Brady Wiggins	Fr
S	38	Rickey Hyatt Jr.	So
OLB	39	Dalton Hughes	Fr
CB	40	Korian Wilson	Fr
DL	45	Ed Smith IV	Fr
LB	46	Shaheim Carroll	Jr
DL	48	Gi'Narious Johnson	Sr
ILB	54	Sullivan Altman	So
DL	55	Maurice Strong Jr.	Jr
DL	90	Carlos Johnson Jr.	So
DL	91	Nathan Rawlins-Kibonge	Fr
DL	95	Brock Higdon	So
DL	99	Wy’Kevious Thomas	So

Special teams

Pos.	#	Name	Class
LS	28	Travis Drosos	So
K	31	Jacob Meeks	Jr
K	36	Diego Guajardo	Jr
LS	42	Anthony Zaccaro	So
P	87	Jack Martin	Jr
P	92	Jack Brooks	Jr
K	97	Gage Theus	So

Head coach

- Kane Wommack (Southern Miss)

Coordinators/assistant coaches

- Major Applewhite (Texas)
  Offensive coordinator/qb
- Corey Batoon (Long Beach State)
  Defensive coordinator/s
- Antonio Bradford (Alabama State)
  Running backs
- Rob Ezell (Alabama)
  Tight ends
- Jamael Lett (Tennessee Tech)
  Special teams coordinator
- Michael Smith (Kansas State)
  Wide receivers
- Gordon Steele (LSU)
  Offensive linemen
- Landius Wilkerson (Tennessee Tech)
  Defensive linemen
- Dwike Wilson (Mississippi)
  Cornerbacks/recruiting coordinator
- Will Windham (Mississippi State)
  Linebackers

Legend

- (C) Team captain
- (S) Suspended
- (I) Ineligible
- Injured
- Redshirt

Roster

== Schedule ==
South Alabama and the Sun Belt Conference announced the 2022 football schedule on March 1, 2022.

Date	Time	Opponent	Site	TV	Result	Attendance
September 3	4:00 p.m.	Nicholls*	Hancock Whitney Stadium; Mobile, AL	ESPN3	W 48–7	15,101
September 10	12:00 p.m.	at Central Michigan*	Kelly/Shorts Stadium; Mount Pleasant, MI	ESPN+	W 38–24	17,205
September 17	1:00 p.m.	at UCLA*	Rose Bowl; Pasadena, CA	P12N	L 31–32	29,344
September 24	6:00 p.m.	Louisiana Tech*	Hancock Whitney Stadium; Mobile, AL	ESPN+	W 38–14	17,939
October 1	4:00 p.m.	at Louisiana	Cajun Field; Lafayette, LA	ESPN+	W 20–17	20,671
October 15	6:00 p.m.	Louisiana–Monroe^{†}	Hancock Whitney Stadium; Mobile, AL	NFLN	W 41–34	15,459
October 20	6:30 p.m.	Troy	Hancock Whitney Stadium; Mobile, AL (rivalry)	ESPNU	L 6–10	25,450
October 29	3:00 p.m.	at Arkansas State	Centennial Bank Stadium; Jonesboro, AR	ESPNU	W 31–3	11,714
November 5	3:00 p.m.	at Georgia Southern	Paulson Stadium; Statesboro, GA	ESPN+	W 38–31	17,084
November 12	4:00 p.m.	Texas State	Hancock Whitney Stadium; Mobile, AL	ESPN+	W 38–21	14,518
November 19	2:30 p.m.	at Southern Miss	M. M. Roberts Stadium; Hattiesburg, MS	NFLN	W 27–20	24,032
November 26	11:00 a.m.	Old Dominion	Hancock Whitney Stadium; Mobile, AL	ESPN+	W 27–20	11,407
December 21	8:00 p.m.	vs. Western Kentucky*	Caesars Superdome; New Orleans, LA (New Orleans Bowl)	ESPN	L 23–44	13,456
*Non-conference game; ^{†}Homecoming; All times are in Central time

== Game summaries ==
=== Nicholls ===
Nicholls Colonels (0–0) at South Alabama Jaguars (0–0)

Quarter	1	2	3	4	Total
Colonels	0	0	0	7	7
Jaguars	10	17	14	7	48

at Hancock Whitney Stadium, Mobile, AL

- Date: September 3, 2022
- Game time: 4:00 p.m. CDT
- Game weather: Sunny • Temperature: 88 °F (31 °C) • Wind: SE 4 mph
- Game attendance: 15,101
- Referee: Javarro Edwards
- TV announcers (ESPN3): J.D. Byars (play-by-play) and Pat Greenwood (analyst)

Game information

First Quarter

- (4:05) USA – La'Damian Webb 15-yard run, Diego Guajardo kick (Drive: 6 plays, 80 yards, 2:48; South Alabama 7–0)
- (1:54) USA – Diego Guajardo 39-yard field goal (Drive: 4 plays, 3 yards, 1:29; South Alabama 10–0)

Second Quarter

- (13:50) USA – Jalen Wayne 52-yard pass from Carter Bradley, Diego Guajardo kick (Drive: 4 plays, 83 yards, 1:17; South Alabama 17–0)
- (9:27) USA – Carter Bradley 4-yard run, Diego Guajardo kick (Drive: 1 play, 4 yards, 0:08; South Alabama 24–0)
- (1:30) USA – Diego Guajardo 48-yard field goal (Drive: 14 plays, 54 yards, 5:26; South Alabama 27–0)

Third Quarter

- (6:58) USA – Jalen Wayne 37-yard pass from Carter Bradley, Diego Guajardo kick (Drive: 4 plays, 66 yards, 1:17; South Alabama 34–0)
- (3:52) USA – Braylon McReynolds 18-yard pass from Carter Bradley, Diego Guajardo kick (Drive: 5 plays, 60 yards, 2:07; South Alabama 41–0)

Fourth Quarter

- (14:24) NSU – Julien Gums 10-yard run, Gavin Lasseigne kick (Drive: 9 plays, 75 yards, 4:28; South Alabama 41–7)
- (11:22) USA – La'Damian Webb 2-yard run, Diego Guajardo kick (Drive: 7 plays, 77 yards, 2:56; South Alabama 48–7)

Win Probability

Line

Over/Under

Statistics	NICH	USA
First downs	10	24
Total yards	165	508
Rushing yards	59	176
Passing yards	106	332
Passing: Comp–Att–Int	15–28–1	26–35–0
Time of possession	25:11	34:49

Team	Category	Player	Statistics
Nicholls	Passing	Kohen Granier	15/27, 106 yards, INT
Nicholls	Rushing	Julien Gums	9 carries, 33 yards, TD
Nicholls	Receiving	Neno Lemay	3 receptions, 40 yards
South Alabama	Passing	Carter Bradley	17/25, 260 yards, 3 TD
South Alabama	Rushing	La'Damian Webb	18 carries, 98 yards, 2 TD
South Alabama	Receiving	Jalen Wayne	3 receptions, 98 yards, 2 TD

=== At Central Michigan ===
South Alabama Jaguars (1–0) at Central Michigan Chippewas (0–1)

Quarter	1	2	3	4	Total
Jaguars	20	11	0	7	38
Chippewas	7	3	0	14	24

at Kelly/Shorts Stadium, Mount Pleasant, MI

- Date: September 10, 2022
- Game time: 12:00 p.m. CDT
- Game weather: Sunny • Temperature: 79 °F (26 °C) • Wind: SW 11 mph
- Game attendance: 17,205
- Referee: Tom Stapleton
- TV announcers (ESPN+): Dan Gutowsky (play-by-play) and Marcus Ray (analyst)

Game information

First Quarter

- (8:51) USA – Carter Bradley 16-yard pass from Carter Bradley (Drive: 7 plays, 88 yards, 2:57; South Alabama 6–0)
- (5:08) CMU – Lew Nichols 5-yard run, Marshall Meeder kick (Drive: 4 plays, 63 yards, 1:08; Central Michigan 7–6)
- (1:29) USA – La'Damian Webb 3-yard run, Diego Guajardo kick (Drive: 10 plays, 65 yards, 2:29; South Alabama 13–7)
- (1:05) USA – Devin Voisin 22-yard pass from Carter Bradley, Diego Guajardo kick (Drive: 3 plays, 22 yards, 0:12; South Alabama 20–7)

Second Quarter

- (12:14) USA – Jalen Wayne 10-yard pass from Carter Bradley, Devin Voisin pass (Drive: 6 plays, 50 yards, 2:46; South Alabama 28–7)
- (5:47) USA – Diego Guajardo 36-yard field goal (Drive: 11 plays, 62 yards, 4:30; South Alabama 31–7)
- (1:21) CMU – Marshall Meeder 48-yard field goal (Drive: 6 plays, 25 yards, 0:51; South Alabama 31–10)

Third Quarter

No scoring plays

Fourth Quarter

- (10:53) USA – La'Damian Webb 30-yard run, Diego Guajardo kick (Drive: 6 plays, 61 yards, 2:06; South Alabama 38–10)
- (8:43) CMU – Marion Lukes 12-yard run (Drive: 9 plays, 75 yards, 2:10; South Alabama 38–16)
- (4:30) CMU – Joel Wilson 21-yard pass from Daniel Richardson, D.C. Temple pass (Drive: 10 plays, 82 yards, 2:09; South Alabama 38–24)

Win Probability

Line

Over/Under

Statistics	USA	CMU
First downs	30	23
Total yards	502	338
Rushing yards	148	81
Passing yards	354	257
Passing: Comp–Att–Int	26–42–1	23–47–0
Time of possession	38:00	22:00

Team	Category	Player	Statistics
South Alabama	Passing	Carter Bradley	26/42, 354 yards, 3 TD, INT
South Alabama	Rushing	La'Damian Webb	20 carries, 91 yards, 2 TD
South Alabama	Receiving	Jalen Wayne	10 receptions, 98 yards, TD
Central Michigan	Passing	Daniel Richardson	23/47, 257 yards, TD
Central Michigan	Rushing	Marion Lukes	3 carries, 36 yards, TD
Central Michigan	Receiving	Joel Wilson	7 receptions, 73 yards, TD

=== At UCLA ===
South Alabama Jaguars (2–0) vs UCLA Bruins (2–0) – Game summary

Quarter	1	2	3	4	Total
Jaguars	10	7	14	0	31
Bruins	6	7	10	9	32

at Rose Bowl (stadium) • Pasadena, CA

- Date: September 17, 2022
- Game time: 1:00 p.m. CST
- Game weather: Sunny, 71 °F (22 °C)
- Game attendance: 29,344
- Referee: Chris Coyte
- TV announcers (Pac-12 Network): Ted Robinson (play-by-play), Yogi Roth (analyst)

Game information

First Quarter

- (12:15) UCLA – Nicholas Barr-Mira 38-yard field goal (Drive: 4 plays, 1 yards, 0:56; UCLA 3–0)
- (8:51) USA – Marco Lee 1-yard run, Diego Guajardo kick (Drive: 9 plays, 75 yards, 3:24; USA 7–3)
- (4:22) UCLA – Nicholas Barr-Mira 49-yard field goal (Drive: 10 plays, 59 yards, 4:24; USA 7–6)
- (1:18) USA – Diego Guajardo 38-yard field goal (Drive: 9 plays, 55 yards, 3:04; USA 10–6)

Second Quarter

- (5:54) USA – La'Damian Webb 9-yard run, Diego Guajardo kick (Drive: 12 plays, 80 yards, 6:31; USA 17–6)
- (3:25) UCLA – Jake Bobo 9-yard pass from Dorian Thompson-Robinson, Nicholas Barr-Mira kick (Drive: 6 plays, 69 yards, 2:29; USA 17–13)

Third Quarter

- (13:22) UCLA – Kam Brown 11-yard pass from Dorian Thompson-Robinson, Nicholas Barr-Mira kick (Drive: 4 plays, 75 yards, 1:38; UCLA 20–17)
- (4:46) UCLA – Nicholas Barr-Mira 28-yard field goal (Drive: 13 plays, 56 yards, 5:11; UCLA 23–17)
- (1:43) USA – Marco Lee 1-yard run, Diego Guajardo kick (Drive: 8 plays, 67 yards, 2:58; USA 24–23)
- (0:57) USA – Caullin Lacy Allen 4–yard pass from Carter Bradley, Diego Guajardo kick (Drive: 2 plays, 6 yards, 0:27; USA 31–23)

Fourth Quarter

- (12:25) UCLA – Logan Loya 8-yard pass from Dorian Thompson-Robinson (Drive: 10 plays, 68 yards, 3:26; USA 31–29)
- (0:00) UCLA – Nicholas Barr-Mira 24-yard field goal (Drive: 10 plays, 61 yards, 2:52; UCLA 32–31)

Statistics	USA	UCLA
First downs	22	23
Total yards	399	407
Rushes/yards	34–162	37–144
Passing yards	237	263
Passing: Comp–Att–Int	26–36–1	20–30–0
Time of possession	32:47	27:13

Team	Category	Player	Statistics
South Alabama	Passing	Carter Bradley	26/36, 237 yards, TD, INT
South Alabama	Rushing	La'Damian Webb	16 carries, 124 yards, TD
South Alabama	Receiving	Jalen Wayne	7 receptions, 76 yards
UCLA	Passing	Dorian Thompson-Robinson	20/30, 263 yards, 3 TD
UCLA	Rushing	Zach Charbonnet	13 carries, 78 yards
UCLA	Receiving	Jake Bobo	5 receptions, 89 yards, TD

=== Louisiana Tech ===
Louisiana Tech Bulldogs (1–2) at South Alabama Jaguars (2–1)

Quarter	1	2	3	4	Total
Bulldogs	0	7	0	7	14
Jaguars	14	3	14	7	38

at Hancock Whitney Stadium, Mobile, AL

- Date: September 24, 2022
- Game time: 6:00 p.m. CDT
- Game attendance: 17,939
- Referee: Patrick Foy
- TV announcers (ESPN+): J.D. Byars (play-by-play) and Pat Greenwood (analyst)

Game information

First Quarter
Second Quarter
Third Quarter
Fourth Quarter

Win Probability

Line

Over/Under

Statistics	LT	USA
First downs	17	23
Total yards	308	389
Rushing yards	57	175
Passing yards	251	214
Turnovers	5	1
Time of possession	31:09	28:51

Team	Category	Player	Statistics
Louisiana Tech	Passing	Parker McNeil	19/34, 251 yards, 2 TD, 4 INT
Louisiana Tech	Rushing	Greg Garner	7 receptions, 51 yards
Louisiana Tech	Receiving	Tre Harris	6 receptions, 85 yards
South Alabama	Passing	Carter Bradley	14/21, 178 yards, 3 TD, INT
South Alabama	Rushing	La'Damian Webb	14 rushes, 75 yards
South Alabama	Receiving	Caullin Lacy	3 receptions, 40 yards, TD

=== At Louisiana ===
South Alabama Jaguars (3–1) at Louisiana Ragin' Cajuns (2–2)

Quarter	1	2	3	4	Total
Jaguars	0	7	3	10	20
Ragin' Cajuns	7	0	0	10	17

at Cajun Field, Lafayette, LA

- Date: October 1, 2022
- Game time: 4:00 p.m. CDT
- Game weather: 84 °F (29 °C) • Weather: Sunny • Wind: N 11 MPH
- Game attendance: 20,671
- Referee: Wayne Winkler
- TV announcers (ESPN+): Dan McDonald (play-by-play) and Eric Mouton (analyst)

Game information

First Quarter

- (7:53) ULL – Eric Garror 69-yard punt return, Kenneth Almendares kick (Drive: 3 plays, 6 yards, 1:22; ULL 7–0)

Second Quarter

- (2:54) USA – La'Damian Webb 1-yard rush, Diego Guajardo kick (Drive: 11 plays, 68 yards, 4:46; TIED 7–7)

Third Quarter

- (8:29) USA – Diego Guajardo 38-yard field goal (Drive: 7 plays, 44 yards, 2:52; USA 10–7)

Fourth Quarter

- (12:53) USA – Carter Bradley 3-yard rush, Diego Guajardo kick (Drive: 11 plays, 51 yards, 4:46; ULL 17–7)
- (7:43) ULL – Kenneth Almendares 51-yard field goal (Drive: 12 plays, 41 yards, 5:10; USA 17–10)
- (0:42) ULL – Pearse Migl 81-yard pass from Ben Wooldridge, Kenneth Almendares kick (Drive: 17 plays, 82 yards, 6:17; TIED 17–17)
- (0:00) USA – Diego Guajardo 43-yard field goal (Drive: 8 plays, 49 yards, 0:42; USA 20–17)

Win Probability

Line

- USA –8.5

Over/Under

- 47.5

Statistics	USA	ULL
First downs	20	17
Total yards	361	274
Rushing yards	116	159
Passing yards	245	115
Turnovers	2	3
Time of possession	30:18	29:42

Team	Category	Player	Statistics
South Alabama	Passing	Carter Bradley	18/41, 245 yards, INT
South Alabama	Rushing	La'Damian Webb	22 carries, 75 yards, TD
South Alabama	Receiving	Caullin Lacy	5 receptions, 112 yards
Louisiana	Passing	Ben Wooldridge	18/29, 90 yards, TD, INT
Louisiana	Rushing	Chris Smith	12 carries, 107 yards
Louisiana	Receiving	Peter LeBlanc	3 receptions, 23 yards

=== Louisiana–Monroe ===
Louisiana–Monroe Warhawks (2–4) at South Alabama Jaguars (4–1)

Quarter	1	2	3	4	Total
Warhawks	7	13	0	14	34
Jaguars	10	7	17	7	41

at Hancock Whitney Stadium, Mobile, AL

- Date: October 15, 2022
- Game time: 6:00 p.m. CDT
- Game weather: Sunny • Temperature:, Wind: SE 7mph
- Game attendance: 15,459
- Referee: Javarro Edwards
- TV: NFLN

Game information

First Quarter
Second Quarter
Third Quarter
Fourth Quarter

Win Probability

Line

Over/Under

Statistics	ULM	USA
First downs	18	25
Total yards	4	9
Rushing yards	67	195
Passing yards	438	615
Passing: comp–att–int	20–27–1	25–33–0
Time of possession	28:18	26:42

Team	Category	Player	Statistics
Louisiana–Monroe	Passing	Chandler Rogers	20/27, 371 yards, 4 TD, INT
Louisiana–Monroe	Rushing	Malik Jackson	13 carries, 39 yards
Louisiana–Monroe	Receiving	Tyrone Howell	9 receptions, 244 yards, 3 TD
South Alabama	Passing	Carter Bradley	25/33, 420 yards, 3 TD
South Alabama	Rushing	Marco Lee	15 carries, 93 yards, 2 TD
South Alabama	Receiving	Devin Voisin	7 receptions, 141 yards

=== Troy ===
Troy Trojans (5–2) at South Alabama Jaguars (5–1)

Quarter	1	2	3	4	Total
Trojans	0	7	0	3	10
Jaguars	0	3	0	3	6

at Hancock Whitney Stadium, Mobile, AL

- Date: October 20, 2022
- Game time: 6:30 p.m. CDT
- Game attendance: 25,450
- TV announcers (ESPNU): Wes Durham (play-by-play) and Roddy Jones (analyst)

Game information

First Quarter
Second Quarter
Third Quarter
Fourth Quarter

Win Probability

Line

Over/Under

Statistics	TROY	USA
First downs	16	15
Total yards	266	246
Rushing yards	128	31
Passing yards	138	215
Passing: comp–att–int	14–19–1	29–41–1
Time of possession	33:24	26:36

Team	Category	Player	Statistics
Troy	Passing	Jarret Doege	10/15, 84 yards, INT
Troy	Rushing	DK Billingsley	19 carries, 86 yards, TD
Troy	Receiving	Tez Johnson	4 receptions, 57 yards
South Alabama	Passing	Carter Bradley	29/40, 215 yards, INT
South Alabama	Rushing	Omni Wells	4 carries, 21 yards
South Alabama	Receiving	Devin Voisin	9 receptions, 93 yards

=== At Arkansas State ===
South Alabama Jaguars (5–2) at Arkansas State Red Wolves (2–6)

Quarter	1	2	3	4	Total
Jaguars	14	2	8	7	31
Red Wolves	3	0	0	0	3

at Centennial Bank Stadium, Jonesboro, AR

- Date: October 29, 2022
- Game time: 3:00 p.m. CDT
- Game weather: Cloudy Temperature: 70°F Wind: NE 18 mph
- Game attendance: 11,714
- Referee: Trennis Livingston
- TV announcers (ESPNU): Kevin Brown (play-by-play) and Hutson Mason (analyst)

Game information

First Quarter
Second Quarter
Third Quarter
Fourth Quarter

Win Probability

Line

Over/Under

Statistics	USA	ARST
First downs	16	9
Total yards	362	158
Rushing yards	183	–19
Passing yards	179	177
Passing: comp–att–int	17–24–0	22–39–0
Time of possession	35:59	24:01

Team	Category	Player	Statistics
South Alabama	Passing	Carter Bradley	17/24, 179 yards, TD
South Alabama	Rushing	La'Damian Webb	28 carries, 162 yards, 3 TD
South Alabama	Receiving	Jalen Wayne	3 receptions, 83 yards, TD
Arkansas State	Passing	James Blackman	22/39, 177 yards
Arkansas State	Rushing	Marcel Murray	4 carries, 15 yards
Arkansas State	Receiving	Jeff Foreman	6 receptions, 98 yards

=== At Georgia Southern ===
South Alabama Jaguars (6–2) at Georgia Southern Eagles (5–3)

Quarter	1	2	3	4	Total
Jaguars	7	10	7	14	38
Eagles	21	3	7	0	31

at Paulson Stadium, Statesboro, GA

- Date: November 5, 2022
- Game time: 3:00 p.m. CDT
- Game weather: Cloudy Temperature: 80°F
- Game attendance: 17,084
- Referee: Marshall Lewis
- TV announcers (ESPN+): Danny Waugh (play-by-play), Cole Neely (analyst) and Emily Grace McWhorter (sideline)

Game information

First Quarter
Second Quarter
Third Quarter
Fourth Quarter

Win Probability

Line

Over/Under

Statistics	USA	GASO
First downs	29	21
Total yards	514	366
Rushing yards	321	88
Passing yards	193	278
Passing: comp–att–int	16–27–2	26–45–1
Time of possession	37:04	22:56

Team	Category	Player	Statistics
South Alabama	Passing	Carter Bradley	16/27, 193 yards, TD, 2 INT
South Alabama	Rushing	La'Damian Webb	35 carries, 247 yards, 4 TD
South Alabama	Receiving	Devin Voisin	2 receptions, 42 yards
Georgia Southern	Passing	Kyle Vantrease	26/45, 278 yards, 2 TD, INT
Georgia Southern	Rushing	Jalen White	10 carries, 65 yards, TD
Georgia Southern	Receiving	Derwin Burgess Jr.	8 carries, 96 yards, TD

=== Texas State ===
Texas State Bobcats (3–6) at South Alabama Jaguars (7–2)

Quarter	1	2	3	4	Total
Bobcats	0	0	7	14	21
Jaguars	10	7	7	14	38

at Hancock Whitney Stadium, Mobile, AL

- Date: November 12, 2022
- Game time: 4:00 p.m. CDT
- Game weather: Sunny Temperature: 56°F Wind: NW 10 mph
- Game attendance: 14,518
- Referee: Javarro Edwards
- TV announcers (ESPN+): J.D. Byars (play-by-play) and Pat Greenwood (analyst)

Game information

First Quarter
Second Quarter
Third Quarter
Fourth Quarter

Win Probability

Line

Over/Under

Statistics	TXST	USA
First downs	20	19
Total yards	230	380
Rushing yards	87	106
Passing yards	143	274
Passing: comp–att–int	24–42–1	20–34–0
Time of possession	26:27	33:33

Team	Category	Player	Statistics
Texas State	Passing	Layne Hatcher	24/42, 143 yards, TD, INT
Texas State	Rushing	Josh Berry	15 carries, 87 yards, TD
Texas State	Receiving	Lincoln Pare	6 receptions, 30 yards
South Alabama	Passing	Carter Bradley	20/34, 274 yards, 4 TD
South Alabama	Rushing	Marco Lee	14 carries, 57 yards
South Alabama	Receiving	Devin Voisin	6 receptions, 118 yards, 2 TD

=== At Southern Miss ===
South Alabama Jaguars (8–2) at Southern Miss Golden Eagles (5–5)

Quarter	1	2	3	4	Total
Jaguars	3	10	0	14	27
Golden Eagles	7	3	7	3	20

at M. M. Roberts Stadium, Hattiesburg, MS

- Date: November 19, 2022
- Game time: 2:30 p.m. CDT
- Game weather: Cloudy Temperature: 48°F Wind: N 3 mph
- Game attendance: 24,032
- Referee: Jeremy Parker
- TV announcers (NFLN): Jason Ross Jr. (play-by-play) and Tyoka Jackson (analyst)

Game information

First Quarter
Second Quarter
Third Quarter
Fourth Quarter

Win Probability

Line

Over/Under

Statistics	USA	USM
First downs	16	21
Total yards	411	298
Rushing yards	154	102
Passing yards	257	196
Passing: comp–att–int	17–26–2	19–34–1
Time of possession	28:46	31:14

Team	Category	Player	Statistics
South Alabama	Passing	Carter Bradley	15/22, 238 yards, 3 TD, 2 INT
South Alabama	Rushing	Braylon McReynolds	15 carries, 100 yards
South Alabama	Receiving	Devin Voisin	6 receptions, 97 yards, TD
Southern Miss	Passing	Trey Lowe III	18/33, 167 yards, INT
Southern Miss	Rushing	Frank Gore Jr.	20 carries, 66 yards, TD
Southern Miss	Receiving	Jason Brownlee	7 receptions, 109 yards, TD

=== Old Dominion ===
Old Dominion Monarchs (3–8) at South Alabama Jaguars (9–2)

Quarter	1	2	3	4	Total
Monarchs	10	10	0	0	20
Jaguars	7	6	7	7	27

at Hancock Whitney Stadium, Mobile, AL

- Date: November 26, 2022
- Game time: 11:00 a.m. CDT
- Game attendance: 11,407
- TV announcers (ESPN+): J.D. Byars (play-by-play) and Pat Greenwood (analyst)

Game information

First Quarter
Second Quarter
Third Quarter
Fourth Quarter

Win Probability

Line

Over/Under

Statistics	ODU	USA
First downs	17	24
Total yards	381	398
Rushing yards	96	208
Passing yards	285	190
Turnovers	0	1
Time of possession	24:52	35:08

Team	Category	Player	Statistics
Old Dominion	Passing	Hayden Wolff	21/36, 285 yards, 2 TD
Old Dominion	Rushing	Blake Watson	18 carries, 110 yards
Old Dominion	Receiving	Blake Watson	6 receptions, 88 yards, 1 TD
South Alabama	Passing	Carter Bradley	17/29, 190 yards, 3 TD, 1 INT
South Alabama	Rushing	La'Damian Webb	18 carries, 74 yards
South Alabama	Receiving	Jalen Wayne	3 receptions, 63 yards, 1 TD

=== Vs. Western Kentucky (New Orleans Bowl) ===
Western Kentucky Hilltoppers (8–5) vs. South Alabama Jaguars (10–2) (R+L Carriers New Orleans Bowl)

Quarter	1	2	3	4	Total
Hilltoppers	14	17	10	3	44
Jaguars	0	3	14	6	23

at Caesars Superdome, New Orleans, LA

- Date: December 21, 2022
- Game time: 8:00 p.m. CDT
- Game weather: n/a (game played indoors)
- Game attendance: 13,456
- Referee: Cal McNeill
- TV announcers (ESPN): Wes Durham (play-by-play), Roddy Jones (analyst), and Taylor Davis (sideline)
- Box score

Game information

First Quarter
Second Quarter
Third Quarter
Fourth Quarter

Win Probability

Line

Over/Under

Statistics	WKU	USA
First downs	29	28
Total yards	677	421
Rushing yards	155	44
Passing yards	522	377
Passing: comp–att–int	37–56–1	37–55–2
Time of possession	28:44	31:16

Team	Category	Player	Statistics
Western Kentucky	Passing	Austin Reed	36/55, 497 yards, 4 TD, INT
Western Kentucky	Rushing	Markese Stepp	7 carries, 63 yards
Western Kentucky	Receiving	Dalvin Smith	6 receptions, 145 yards, TD
South Alabama	Passing	Carter Bradley	36/53, 360 yards, 3 TD, 2 INT
South Alabama	Rushing	La'Damian Webb	12 carries, 48 yards
South Alabama	Receiving	Devin Voisin	11 receptions, 153 yards, TD

== Rankings ==
Ranking movements Legend: ██ Increase in ranking ██ Decrease in ranking — = Not ranked RV = Received votes
	Week															
Poll	Pre	1	2	3	4	5	6	7	8	9	10	11	12	13	14	Final
AP	—	—	—	—	—	—	—	—	RV	—	—	—	RV	RV	RV	—
Coaches	—	—	—	—	—	—	—	—	RV	—	—	—	RV	RV	RV	RV
CFP	Not released									—	—	—	—	—	—	Not released
