= Kane Wommack =

American football player and coach (born 1987)

Current position
- Title: Defensive coordinator
- Team: Alabama
- Conference: SEC

Biographical details
- Born: April 19, 1987 (age 39); Springfield, Missouri, U.S.

Playing career
- 2005–2006: Arkansas
- 2007–2009: Southern Miss
- Positions: Fullback, tight end

Coaching career (HC unless noted)
- 2010: UT Martin (QB)
- 2011: Jacksonville State (GA)
- 2012–2013: Ole Miss (GA)
- 2014–2015: Eastern Illinois (DC)
- 2016–2017: South Alabama (DC/LB)
- 2018: Indiana (LB)
- 2019–2020: Indiana (DC/LB)
- 2021–2023: South Alabama
- 2024–present: Alabama (DC)

Head coaching record
- Overall: 22–16
- Bowls: 1–1

Accomplishments and honors

Championships
- 1 Sun Belt West Division (2022)

Kane Wommack (born April 19, 1987) is an American college football coach and former player. He is the defensive coordinator for the University of Alabama, a position he has held since 2024. He previously served as the defensive coordinator and linebackers coach at Indiana from 2018 to 2020 and as the head coach of South Alabama from 2021 to 2023.

== Playing career ==
Wommack played fullback at Arkansas from 2005 to 2006, and helped the Razorbacks capture the Southeastern Conference (SEC) West Division title in 2006. He transferred to Southern Miss, and helped the Golden Eagles to three straight bowl game appearances.

== Coaching career ==
=== UT Martin ===
Kane Wommack started his college coaching career as the quarterbacks coach for the UT Martin Skyhawks team in 2010.

=== Jacksonville State ===
In 2011, Wommack served as a graduate assistant for Jack Crowe at Jacksonville State. He coached the defensive line.

=== Ole Miss ===
The following year, Wommack joined Hugh Freeze's new staff at Ole Miss as a graduate assistant. He joined his father Dave Wommack's defensive staff. Dave had just been hired as the defensive coordinator. Here, Kane coached the “Husky” position, one of the defensive backs in his father's 4-2-5 defensive scheme.

While at Ole Miss, he also worked with Tom Allen for the first time. Allen was hired as the special teams coordinator and linebackers coach.

=== Eastern Illinois ===
In 2014, Wommack was named the defensive coordinator at Eastern Illinois. In his first year at Eastern Illinois, Wommack's defense ranked second in the Ohio Valley Conference (OVC) in scoring and fourth in takeaways. In addition, four defensive players earned all-OVC honors that fall.

In his second season, Wommack helped the Panthers to a first-round appearance in the 2015 NCAA Division I FCS playoffs, and a top-25 national ranking in the final polls. Under his direction, Eastern Illinois defensive lineman Dino Fanti was named the 2015 Ohio Valley Conference co-Defensive Player of the year, as well as the College Football Performance Awards FCS Defensive Tackle of the Year and a first-team All-American by the American Football Coaches Association. Eastern Illinois defensive back Jourdan Wickliffe earned first-team all-OVC honors in consecutive seasons under Wommack's direction.

During the 2015 campaign the Panther defense ranked second nationally in interceptions (19), third in takeaways (31), fourth in pass efficiency defense (103.0), eighth in red zone defense (67.3%) and 10th in tackles for loss (98). Eastern Illinois led the OVC in pass efficiency defense (91.8) and red zone defense (53.3%) that year, while ranking second in the league in scoring defense (19.8 ppg), pass defense (194.8 ypg), third-down defense (29.7%), first-down defense (17.2%) and sacks (19).

=== South Alabama ===
Wommack joined the staff at South Alabama prior to the 2016 season, to serve as the defensive coordinator and linebackers coach.

During Wommack's two seasons in Mobile, Alabama, South Alabama was the 13th-most improved scoring defense (-10.8) and rushing defense (-69.2) in the nation. He engineered one of the top turnarounds in the country. The unit was the fifth-most improved nationally in scoring defense (-10.3), and ranked in the top 10 nationally in passing defense. The Jaguars finished in the top five in the Sun Belt Conference in pass defense, pass efficiency defense, tackles for loss and third-down conversion percentage against. USA was one of two programs with multiple first team all-conference honorees and both of his starting linebackers received postseason accolades.

Safety Jeremy Reaves was recognized as the 2017 Sun Belt Defensive Player of the Year and twice as a first team all-league honoree. The 2017 defense surrendered 22 points or fewer in regulation seven times in eight conference games.

=== Indiana ===
Wommack rejoined Tom Allen at Indiana in 2018, when Allen hired him to be the teams linebackers coach as the tenth assistant coach.

On December 27, 2018, Allen gave up the defensive coordinator duties and announced that Wommack would move forward as running the defense.

Wommack additionally collaborated with future Alabama coach Kalen DeBoer, who served as Indiana’s offensive coordinator at the time.

=== South Alabama (second stint) ===
On December 12, 2020, Wommack was named the third head coach at the University of South Alabama.

=== Alabama ===
On January 16, 2024, Wommack resigned from South Alabama to join Kalen DeBoer's staff at the University of Alabama.

== Personal life ==
Wommack is the son of former college coach Dave Wommack. He was born in Springfield, Missouri, but went to high school in Fayetteville, Arkansas. He then earned his bachelor's degree in political science at the University of Southern Mississippi.

Wommack and his wife, Melissa, have three sons, Asher, Tatum, and Jones.

== Head coaching record ==
Year	Team	Overall	Conference	Standing	Bowl/playoffs
South Alabama Jaguars (Sun Belt Conference) (2021–2023)
2021	South Alabama	5–7	2–6	T–3rd (West)	
2022	South Alabama	10–3	7–1	T–1st (West)	L New Orleans
2023	South Alabama	7–6	4–4	T–2nd (West)	W 68 Ventures
South Alabama:		22–16	13–11		
Total:		22–16			
National championship Conference title Conference division title or championship game berth
