= Rob Ezell =

American football player and coach (born 1988)

Current position
- Title: Offensive coordinator
- Team: Wake Forest
- Conference: ACC

Biographical details
- Born: November 3, 1988 (age 37); Athens, Alabama, U.S.
- Education: University of Alabama (2011); Colorado State University (2014)

Playing career
- 2007–2010: Alabama
- Positions: Quarterback, wide receiver

Coaching career (HC unless noted)
- 2011: Alabama (SA)
- 2012–2014: Colorado State (GA)
- 2015–2016: Alabama (GA)
- 2017–2020: Alabama (OA)
- 2021–2023: South Alabama (TE)
- 2024: South Alabama (OC/QB)
- 2025–present: Wake Forest (OC/TE)

Accomplishments and honors

Championships
- BCS national champion (2010); CFP national champion (2017, 2020)

Robert Ezell (born November 3, 1988) is an American college football coach and former player. He is the offensive coordinator and tight ends coach for Wake Forest University, positions he has held since 2025.

== High school career ==
Ezell attended Athens High School in Athens, Alabama where he played quarterback, helping the Golden Eagles win the school's first Class 5A state championship title in 30 years during his senior year in 2006 and was named the MVP of the game.

== Playing career ==
Ezell played quarterback and wide receiver at the University of Alabama from 2007 to 2010 as a walk-on.

== Coaching career ==
=== Alabama ===
Ezell started his college coaching career as a student assistant at Alabama in 2011.

=== Colorado State ===
From 2012 to 2014, Ezell served as a graduate assistant for the Colorado State Rams while going on to receive his master's degree in adult education. He worked with the wide receivers and quarterbacks helping them with a 18–9 overall record and an 11–5 conference record in his last two seasons along with a 48–45 victory in the 2013 New Mexico Bowl against Washington State.

=== Alabama (second stint) ===
Ezell then returned to Alabama where he served as a graduate assistant from 2015 to 2016 where he aided current Miami (FL) coach Mario Cristobal with the offensive line and tight ends.

He then served as an offensive analyst from 2017 to 2020 where the team played a 65–5 overall record and a 39–3 conference record along with winning two College Football Playoff National Championship titles in 2017 and 2020.

=== South Alabama ===
On December 21, 2020, Ezell was named as the tight ends coach at South Alabama, joining Kane Wommack's new coaching staff. During his first season with the Jaguars, he helped tight end Lincoln Sefcik earn the third team All-Sun Belt honors with 32 receptions for 218 yards and five touchdowns which was the highest total recorded by an individual as a tight end since Gerald Everett.

On February 5, 2024, he was promoted as the offensive coordinator and quarterbacks coach.

=== Wake Forest ===
On January 2, 2025, Ezell was named as the offensive coordinator and quarterbacks coach at Wake Forest, joining Jake Dickert's new coaching staff.

== Personal life ==
Ezell is known for his impersonation of former Alabama head coach, Nick Saban.
