= Yam Banks =

American football player (born 2002)

Profile
- Position: Safety

Personal information
- Born: March 19, 2002 (age 24); Jackson, Mississippi, U.S.
- Listed height: 5 ft 11 in (1.80 m)
- Listed weight: 210 lb (95 kg)

Career information
- High school: Ridgeland (Ridgeland, Mississippi)
- College: South Alabama (2020–2023); Ole Miss (2024)
- NFL draft: 2025: undrafted

Career history
- Toronto Argonauts (2026)

Awards and highlights
- Third-team All-Sun Belt (2023); First-team All-Sun Belt (2022)
- Stats at ESPN

Yamarus Kenyon Banks Jr. (born March 19, 2002) is an American professional football safety. He played college football for the Ole Miss Rebels and the South Alabama Jaguars.

== Early life ==
Banks grew up in Ridgeland, Mississippi and attended Ridgeland High School, where he lettered in football and baseball. He committed to play college football for the South Alabama Jaguars.

== College career ==
=== South Alabama ===
Banks notched two tackles as a freshman in 2020. In 2021, he recorded 49 tackles, with four and a half going for a loss, two pass deflections, and two forced fumbles. In week four of the 2022 season, Banks had a breakout game against Louisiana Tech, where he recovered a fumble, broke up three passes, and intercepted two pass, which he returned one for a touchdown. In the 2022 season, he made 50 tackles, 11 pass deflections, six interceptions and a touchdown, earning first-team all-Sun Belt Conference honors. In 2023, Banks notched 46 tackles with five and a half being for a loss, four pass deflections, and an interception, earning third-team all-Sun Belt honors. After the conclusion of the 2023 season, Banks entered the NCAA transfer portal.

Banks finished his career at South Alabama with 146 tackles, two and a half sacks, seven interceptions, 16 pass deflections, and three forced fumbles.

=== Ole Miss ===
Banks transferred to play for the Ole Miss Rebels.

== Professional career ==
Pre-draft measurables
Height	Weight
5 ft 11 1/4 in (1.81 m)	210 lb (95 kg)
Values from Pro Day

On September 15, 2026, Banks signed with the Toronto Argonauts of the Canadian Football League (CFL). On October 15, he was released.
