= Lincoln Sefcik =

American football player (born 1999)

Profile
- Position: Tight end

Personal information
- Born: July 14, 1999 (age 27); Stillwater, Oklahoma, U.S.
- Listed height: 6 ft 3 in (1.91 m)
- Listed weight: 238 lb (108 kg)

Career information
- High school: Enid (Enid, Oklahoma)
- College: Northeastern Oklahoma A&M (2018–2020); South Alabama (2021–2023)
- NFL draft: 2024: undrafted

Career history
- New York Jets (2024)*
- * Offseason or practice squad member only

Awards and highlights
- Third-team All-Sun Belt (2021)

Lincoln Hart Sefcik (born July 14, 1999) is an American professional football tight end. He most recently played for the New York Jets of the National Football League (NFL). He played college football for the Northeastern Oklahoma A&M Golden Norsemen and the South Alabama Jaguars.

== Early life ==
Sefcik grew up in Enid, Oklahoma and attended Enid High School. In his high school career, Sefcik completed 52 receptions for 716 receiving yards and seven touchdowns. He was an unranked tight end recruit and committed to Northeastern Oklahoma A&M College.

== College career ==
=== Northeastern Oklahoma A&M ===
Sefcik redshirted during his true freshman season in 2018. During the 2019 season, he played in eight games and finished the season with three receptions and 35 yards. Sefcik did not play during the 2020 season. He would then later transfer to South Alabama.

=== South Alabama ===
During the 2021 season, he played in 12 games and started nine of them, finishing the season with 32 receptions for 218 yards and five touchdowns. During the 2022 season, he played in all 13 games and started eight of them, finishing the season with 13 receptions for 111 yards and a touchdown. During the 2023 season, he played in nine games and started six of them, finishing the season with 17 receptions for 165 yards and a touchdown.

On December 24, shortly after finishing the 2023 season, Sefcik announced that he would enter the 2024 NFL draft.

== Professional career ==
Pre-draft measurables
Height	Weight	Arm length	Hand span	40-yard dash	10-yard split	20-yard split	20-yard shuttle	Three-cone drill	Vertical jump	Broad jump	Bench press
6 ft 2 in (1.88 m)	238 lb (108 kg)	32 in (0.81 m)	10 3/8 in (0.26 m)	4.71 s	1.55 s	2.70 s	4.20 s	7.20 s	32.5 in (0.83 m)	9 ft 9 in (2.97 m)	29 reps
All values from Pro Day

Sefick signed with the New York Jets as an undrafted free agent on April 27, 2024. He was waived on August 27, 2024.
