= South Alabama Jaguars football statistical leaders =

The South Alabama Jaguars football statistical leaders are individual statistical leaders of the South Alabama Jaguars football program in various categories, including passing, rushing, receiving, total offense, defensive stats, and kicking. Within those areas, the lists identify single-game, single-season, and career leaders. The Jaguars represent the University of South Alabama in the NCAA's Sun Belt Conference.

South Alabama began competing in intercollegiate football in 2009, so unlike many college football teams, all of South Alabama's games have full box scores and there is no "pre-modern era" with incomplete statistics. During South Alabama's first two seasons, the Jaguars were listed as "unclassified" by the NCAA and players could play in games despite officially redshirting. There are 12 players on the career lists below utilized this extra full season to accumulate statistics.

These lists are updated through the end of the 2025 season.

== Passing ==
=== Passing yards ===
Career
Rank	Player	Yards	Years
1	Carter Bradley	5,996	2022 2023
2	Ross Metheny	4,770	2012 2013
3	Dallas Davis	4,169	2015 2016 2017
4	Desmond Trotter	3,828	2019 2020 2021 2022 2023
5	C.J. Bennett	3,409	2010 2011 2012
6	Gio Lopez	3,034	2023 2024
7	Bishop Davenport	2,679	2024 2025
8	Cole Garvin	2,477	2016 2017 2018
9	Jake Bentley	2,476	2021
10	Brandon Bridge	2,325	2013 2014

Single season
Rank	Player	Yards	Year
1	Carter Bradley	3,336	2022
2	Dallas Davis	2,706	2016
3	Carter Bradley	2,660	2023
4	Ross Metheny	2,622	2013
5	Gio Lopez	2,559	2024
6	Jake Bentley	2,476	2021
7	Cody Clements	2,272	2015
8	Ross Metheny	2,148	2012
9	Bishop Davenport	2,073	2025
10	Brandon Bridge	1,927	2014

Single game
Rank	Player	Yards	Year	Opponent
1	Gio Lopez	432	2024	North Texas
2	Carter Bradley	420	2022	UL Monroe
3	Jake Bentley	389	2021	Georgia Southern
4	Carter Bradley	381	2023	Louisiana
5	Ross Metheny	360	2012	Louisiana–Lafayette
	Evan Orth	360	2018	Memphis
	Carter Bradley	360	2022	Western Kentucky
8	Jake Bentley	354	2021	Coastal Carolina
	Carter Bradley	354	2022	Central Michigan
10	Cole Garvin	343	2017	Arkansas State

=== Passing touchdowns ===
Career
Rank	Player	TDs	Years
1	Carter Bradley	47	2022 2023
2	Desmond Trotter	29	2019 2020 2021 2022 2023
3	Ross Metheny	27	2012 2013
4	Gio Lopez	22	2023 2024
5	C.J. Bennett	20	2010 2011 2012
	Dallas Davis	20	2015 2016 2017
7	Jake Bentley	17	2021
8	Brandon Bridge	16	2013 2014
	Cole Garvin	16	2016 2017 2018
10	Bishop Davenport	15	2024 2025

Single season
Rank	Player	TDs	Year
1	Carter Bradley	28	2022
2	Carter Bradley	19	2023
3	Gio Lopez	18	2024
4	Jake Bentley	17	2021
5	Brandon Bridge	15	2014
	Ross Metheny	15	2013
7	Cody Clements	13	2015
8	Ross Metheny	12	2012
	Bishop Davenport	12	2025
10	Dallas Davis	11	2016
	Evan Orth	11	2018
	Desmond Trotter	11	2020

Single game
Rank	Player	TDs	Year	Opponent
1	Brandon Bridge	4	2014	Navy
	Desmond Trotter	4	2019	Arkansas State
	Jake Bentley	4	2021	UL Monroe
	Jake Bentley	4	2021	Arkansas State
	Carter Bradley	4	2022	Texas State
	Desmond Trotter	4	2023	Texas State
	Gio Lopez	4	2024	Northwestern State
8	Brennan Sim	3	2010	Edward Waters
	C.J. Bennett	3	2010	Georgia State
	Ross Metheny	3	2012	Arkansas State
	Ross Metheny	3	2013	Texas State
	Ross Metheny	3	2013	Louisiana–Monroe
	Brandon Bridge	3	2014	Appalachian State
	Cody Clements	3	2015	Arkansas State
	Cole Garvin	3	2016	San Diego State
	Dallas Davis	3	2017	Louisiana–Monroe
	Evan Orth	3	2018	Memphis
	Desmond Trotter	3	2020	UL Monroe
	Jake Bentley	3	2021	Georgia Southern
	Carter Bradley	3	2022	Nicholls
	Carter Bradley	3	2022	Central Michigan
	Carter Bradley	3	2022	Louisiana Tech
	Carter Bradley	3	2022	UL Monroe
	Carter Bradley	3	2022	Southern Miss
	Carter Bradley	3	2022	Old Dominion
	Carter Bradley	3	2022	Western Kentucky
	Carter Bradley	3	2023	UL Monroe
	Gio Lopez	3	2023	Eastern Michigan
	Gio Lopez	3	2024	North Texas
	Gio Lopez	3	2024	Southern Miss
	Jared Hollins	3	2026	UL Monroe

== Rushing ==
=== Rushing yards ===
Career
Rank	Player	Yards	Years
1	Xavier Johnson	2,670	2014 2015 2016 2017
2	Kendall Houston	2,587	2010 2011 2012 2013 2014
3	Kentrel Bullock	2,364	2023 2024 2025
4	Tra Minter	2,199	2017 2018 2019
5	La'Damian Webb	2,069	2022 2023
6	Jay Jones	1,130	2013 2014
7	Demetre Baker	1,086	2011 2012

Single season
Rank	Player	Yards	Year
1	Kentrel Bullock	1,085	2025
2	La'Damian Webb	1,062	2022
3	Tra Minter	1,057	2019
4	La'Damian Webb	1,007	2023
5	Xavier Johnson	956	2015
6	Kendall Houston	891	2010
7	Fluff Bothwell	832	2024
8	Xavier Johnson	831	2016
	Kentrel Bullock	831	2024
10	Tra Minter	801	2018

Single game
Rank	Player	Yards	Year	Opponent
1	La'Damian Webb	247	2022	Georgia Southern
2	Tra Minter	203	2018	Coastal Carolina
3	Tra Minter	189	2019	Jackson State
4	Kentrel Bullock	187	2025	Southern Miss
5	Kendall Houston	178	2014	Troy
6	Kendall Houston	175	2010	Georgia State
7	Kendall Houston	166	2010	Lamar
8	La'Damian Webb	163	2023	Arkansas State
9	La'Damian Webb	162	2022	Arkansas State
10	Keenan Phillips	157	2026	Arkansas State

=== Rushing touchdowns ===
Career
Rank	Player	TDs	Years
1	La'Damian Webb	29	2022 2023
2	Kendall Houston	28	2010 2011 2012 2013 2014
3	Kentrel Bullock	25	2023 2024 2025
4	Xavier Johnson	24	2014 2015 2016 2017
5	Brandon Ross	18	2009 2010
6	Fluff Bothwell	13	2024
7	Demetre Baker	12	2011 2012
	Tra Minter	12	2017 2018 2019
9	Ross Metheny	11	2012 2013
	Kawaan Baker	11	2017 2018 2019 2020

Single season
Rank	Player	TDs	Year
1	La'Damian Webb	16	2023
2	Kentrel Bullock	14	2025
3	Brandon Ross	13	2009
	La'Damian Webb	13	2022
	Fluff Bothwell	13	2024
6	Kendall Houston	10	2010
	Ross Metheny	10	2013
	Xavier Johnson	10	2016
9	Demetre Baker	9	2011
	Bishop Davenport	9	2025

Single game
Rank	Player	TDs	Year	Opponent
1	La'Damian Webb	4	2022	Georgia Southern
	La'Damian Webb	4	2023	Southern Miss
3	Brandon Ross	3	2009	Louisburg
	Xavier Johnson	3	2016	New Mexico State
	Kareem Walker	3	2021	Alcorn State
	La'Damian Webb	3	2022	Arkansas State
	Kentrel Bullock	3	2025	Southern Miss
	Keenan Phillips	3	2026	Arkansas State

== Receiving ==
=== Receptions ===
Career
Rank	Player	Rec	Years
1	Caullin Lacy	208	2020 2021 2022 2023
2	Jalen Tolbert	178	2018 2019 2020 2021
3	Devin Voisin	172	2019 2022 2023 2024 2025
4	Jeremé Jones	157	2010 2011 2012 2013 2014
5	Jalen Wayne	152	2017 2019 2020 2021 2022
6	Jamaal Pritchett	150	2022 2023 2024
7	Kawaan Baker	126	2017 2018 2019 2020
8	Bryant Lavender	109	2009 2010 2011 2012 2013
9	Jamarius Way	108	2017 2018
10	Shavarez Smith	104	2013 2014

Single season
Rank	Player	Rec	Year
1	Caullin Lacy	91	2023
	Jamaal Pritchett	91	2024
3	Jalen Tolbert	82	2021
4	Devin Voisin	67	2025
5	Caullin Lacy	65	2022
6	Jalen Tolbert	64	2020
	Devin Voisin	64	2022
8	Jamarius Way	61	2018
9	Jalen Wayne	58	2022
10	Jamaal Pritchett	57	2023

Single game
Rank	Player	Rec	Year	Opponent
1	Caullin Lacy	12	2022	UL Monroe
	Jamaal Pritchett	12	2024	Georgia Southern
3	Jamarius Way	11	2018	Texas State
	Jalen Tolbert	11	2021	Georgia Southern
	Devin Voisin	11	2022	Western Kentucky
	Jamaal Pritchett	11	2023	Louisiana
	Caullin Lacy	11	2023	Texas State
	Jamaal Pritchett	11	2024	UL Monroe
	Jamaal Pritchett	11	2024	Louisiana
10	Courtney Smith	10	2010	Arkansas-Monticello
	Wes Saxton	10	2013	Texas State
	Shavarez Smith	10	2013	Georgia State
	Jamarius Way	10	2018	Memphis
	Jalen Tolbert	10	2020	Arkansas State
	Jalen Tolbert	10	2021	UL Monroe
	Jalen Tolbert	10	2021	Coastal Carolina
	Jalen Wayne	10	2022	Central Michigan
	Jamaal Pritchett	10	2024	North Texas
	Jamaal Pritchett	10	2024	Texas State

=== Receiving yards ===
Career
Rank	Player	Yards	Years
1	Jalen Tolbert	3,140	2018 2019 2020 2021
2	Caullin Lacy	2,518	2020 2021 2022 2023
3	Devin Voisin	2,133	2019 2022 2023 2024 2025
4	Jamaal Pritchett	2,034	2022 2023 2024
5	Jalen Wayne	1,980	2017 2019 2020 2021 2022
6	Kawaan Baker	1,829	2017 2018 2019 2020
7	Shavarez Smith	1,688	2013 2014
8	Jeremé Jones	1,655	2010 2011 2012 2013 2014
9	Jamarius Way	1,617	2017 2018
10	Josh Magee	1,326	2015 2016

Single season
Rank	Player	Yards	Year
1	Jalen Tolbert	1,474	2021
2	Caullin Lacy	1,316	2023
3	Jamaal Pritchett	1,127	2024
4	Jalen Tolbert	1,085	2020
5	Shavarez Smith	940	2013
6	Jamaal Pritchett	883	2023
7	Devin Voisin	867	2022
8	Jamarius Way	855	2018
9	Gerald Everett	822	2016
10	Jalen Wayne	817	2022

Single game
Rank	Player	Yards	Year	Opponent
1	Jalen Tolbert	252	2020	Arkansas State
2	Jamaal Pritchett	197	2024	North Texas
3	Shavarez Smith	194	2013	Georgia State
4	Jalen Tolbert	191	2021	Coastal Carolina
5	Jamarius Way	185	2018	Memphis
6	Jeremiah Webb	182	2024	Western Michigan
7	Jalen Tolbert	174	2021	Georgia Southern
8	Jamarius Way	173	2018	Texas State
9	Jamaal Pritchett	170	2024	Louisiana
10	Jalen Tolbert	169	2020	Southern Miss

=== Receiving touchdowns ===
Career
Rank	Player	TDs	Years
1	Jalen Tolbert	22	2018 2019 2020 2021
2	Jamaal Pritchett	17	2022 2023 2024
3	Jeremé Jones	16	2010 2011 2012 2013 2014
	Kawaan Baker	16	2017 2018 2019 2020
5	Shavarez Smith	14	2013 2014
	Jalen Wayne	14	2017 2019 2020 2021 2022
7	Caullin Lacy	13	2020 2021 2022 2023
8	Gerald Everett	12	2015 2016
	DJ Thomas-Jones	12	2022 2023 2024
10	Jamarius Way	11	2017 2018

Single season
Rank	Player	TDs	Year
1	Jalen Wayne	9	2022
	Jamaal Pritchett	9	2024
3	Shavarez Smith	8	2014
	Gerald Everett	8	2015
	Jamarius Way	8	2018
	Kawaan Baker	8	2020
	Jalen Tolbert	8	2020
	Jalen Tolbert	8	2021
	Jamaal Pritchett	8	2023
10	Jeremé Jones	7	2012
	Caullin Lacy	7	2023

Single game
Rank	Player	TDs	Year	Opponent
1	Jalen Tolbert	4	2019	Arkansas State
2	Jamarius Way	3	2018	Coastal Carolina
	Kawaan Baker	3	2020	UL Monroe
	Jalen Tolbert	3	2020	Arkansas State
	DJ Thomas-Jones	3	2023	Texas State

== Total offense ==
Total offense is the sum of passing and rushing statistics. It does not include receiving or returns.

=== Total offense yards ===
Career
Rank	Player	Yards	Years
1	Carter Bradley	6,016	2022 2023
2	Ross Metheny	5,515	2012 2013
3	Dallas Davis	4,415	2015 2016 2017
4	Desmond Trotter	4,164	2019 2020 2021 2022 2023
5	C.J. Bennett	3,779	2010 2011 2012
6	Gio Lopez	3,653	2023 2024
7	Bishop Davenport	3,171	2024 2025
8	Brandon Bridge	2,792	2013 2014
9	Xavier Johnson	2,670	2014 2015 2016 2017
10	Kendall Houston	2,587	2010 2011 2012 2013 2014

Single season
Rank	Player	Yards	Year
1	Carter Bradley	3,400	2022
2	Ross Metheny	3,226	2013
3	Gio Lopez	3,024	2024
4	Dallas Davis	2,937	2016
5	Carter Bradley	2,616	2023
6	Jake Bentley	2,468	2021
7	Bishop Davenport	2,398	2025
8	Cody Clements	2,365	2015
9	Ross Metheny	2,289	2012
10	Brandon Bridge	2,224	2014

Single game
Rank	Player	Yards	Year	Opponent
1	Gio Lopez	494	2024	North Texas
2	Carter Bradley	429	2022	UL Monroe
3	Jake Bentley	397	2021	Georgia Southern
4	Dallas Davis	374	2016	Idaho
5	Carter Bradley	370	2023	Louisiana
6	Evan Orth	369	2018	Memphis
7	Dallas Davis	368	2016	Louisiana-Monroe
8	Ross Metheny	365	2013	Tulane
9	Brandon Bridge	362	2014	Appalachian State
	Carter Bradley	362	2022	Central Michigan

=== Total touchdowns ===
Career
Rank	Player	TDs	Years
1	Carter Bradley	50	2022 2023
2	Ross Metheny	38	2012 2013
3	Desmond Trotter	33	2019 2020 2021 2022 2023
4	Gio Lopez	31	2023 2024
5	Kendall Houston	29	2010 2011 2012 2013 2014
	La'Damian Webb	29	2022 2023
7	Xavier Johnson	27	2014 2015 2016 2017
8	C.J. Bennett	25	2010 2011 2012
	Kentrel Bullock	25	2023 2024 2025
	Bishop Davenport	25	2024 2025

Single season
Rank	Player	TDs	Year
1	Carter Bradley	30	2022
2	Ross Metheny	25	2013
3	Gio Lopez	25	2024
4	Jake Bentley	21	2021
	Bishop Davenport	21	2025
6	Carter Bradley	20	2023
7	Brandon Bridge	19	2014
8	Cody Clements	16	2015
	La'Damian Webb	16	2023
10	Dallas Davis	14	2016
	Kentrel Bullock	14	2025

Single game
Rank	Player	TDs	Year	Opponent
1	Jake Bentley	5	2021	Georgia Southern
2	Ross Metheny	4	2013	Tulane
	Ross Metheny	4	2013	Texas State
	Ross Metheny	4	2013	Louisiana-Monroe
	Brandon Bridge	4	2014	Appalachian State
	Brandon Bridge	4	2014	Navy
	Jake Bentley	4	2021	UL Monroe
	Jake Bentley	4	2021	Arkansas State
	Carter Bradley	4	2022	Nicholls
	La'Damian Webb	4	2022	Georgia Southern
	Carter Bradley	4	2022	Texas State
	La'Damian Webb	4	2023	Southern Miss
	Desmond Trotter	4	2023	Texas State
	Gio Lopez	4	2023	Eastern Michigan
	Gio Lopez	4	2024	North Texas
	Gio Lopez	4	2024	Northwestern State

== Defense ==
=== Interceptions ===
Career
Rank	Player	Ints	Years
1	Jaden Voisin	11	2019 2020 2022 2023 2024
2	Jalen Thompson	9	2015 2016 2018 2019
3	Jeremy Reaves	8	2014 2015 2016 2017
4	Yam Banks	7	2020 2021 2022 2023
5	Tyrell Pearson	6	2012 2013
6	Zach Brownell	5	2009
	Montell Garner	5	2013 2014
	Devin Rockette	5	2017 2019 2020 2021
	Darrell Luter Jr.	5	2020 2021 2022
	Wesley Miller	5	2023 2024 2025

Single season
Rank	Player	Ints	Year
1	Yam Banks	6	2022
2	Zach Brownell	5	2009
	Jaden Voisin	5	2024
4	Tyrell Pearson	4	2012
	Jalen Thompson	4	2016
	Darrell Luter Jr.	4	2021
	Jaden Voisin	4	2023

Single game
Rank	Player	Ints	Year	Opponent
1	Zach Brownell	3	2009	Georgia Military
2	Alex Phifer	2	2009	Huntingdon
	Tim Harvey	2	2010	Georgia State
	Tyrell Pearson	2	2013	Western Kentucky
	Darrell Luter Jr.	2	2021	Arkansas State
	Yam Banks	2	2022	Louisiana Tech

=== Tackles ===
Career
Rank	Player	Tackles	Years
1	Enrique Williams	344	2009 2010 2011 2012 2013
2	Jeremy Reaves	301	2014 2015 2016 2017
3	Roman Buchanon	262	2013 2014 2015 2016
4	Terrell Brigham	256	2010 2012 2013 2014
5	Jeremy Reaves	246	2015 2016 2017 2018
6	Jake Johnson	245	2010 2011 2012
7	Nick Mobley	242	2018 2019 2020

Single season
Rank	Player	Tackles	Year
1	Jake Johnson	131	2012
2	Terrell Brigham	113	2014
3	Enrique Williams	105	2012
	Enrique Williams	105	2013
5	Jeremy Reaves	104	2017
6	Blake Dees	102	2015
7	Blayne Myrick	101	2024
8	Darrell Songy	100	2016
9	Jeremy Reaves	96	2015
	Riley Cole	96	2020

Single game
Rank	Player	Tackles	Year	Opponent
1	Maleki Harris	18	2014	Bowling Green
2	Jake Johnson	17	2011	Kent State
	Enrique Williams	17	2013	Arkansas State
	Jaden Voisin	17	2022	Southern Miss
5	Darrell Songy	16	2016	Air Force
	Nick Mobley	16	2020	Georgia State
7	Jake Johnson	15	2012	Florida International
	Jake Johnson	15	2012	Middle Tennessee
	Nick Mobley	15	2020	Southern Miss
	Riley Cole	15	2020	Texas State
	Riley Cole	15	2020	Coastal Carolina
	Quentin Wilfawn	15	2023	Louisiana

=== Sacks ===
Career
Rank	Player	Sacks	Years
1	Alex Page	17.5	2009 2010 2011 2012 2013
2	Randy Allen	12.0	2015 2016
	Romelle Jones	12.0	2009 2010 2011 2012 2013
4	Clifton Crews	10.0	2009 2010 2011 2012 2013
	Pat Moore	10.0	2012 2013
	Jamie Sheriff	10.0	2020 2022 2023

Single season
Rank	Player	Sacks	Year
1	Randy Allen	12.0	2016
2	Theo Rich	8.0	2014
3	Romelle Jones	7.5	2013
	Alex Page	7.5	2013
5	Quentin Wilfawn	6.5	2023
6	Alex Page	6.0	2012
	Jamie Sheriff	6.0	2022
8	Pat Moore	5.5	2013
9	Jesse Kelley	5.0	2014
	Courtney McBride Jr.	5.0	2024

Single game
Rank	Player	Sacks	Year	Opponent
1	Theo Rich	3.5	2014	Georgia State
2	Randy Allen	3.0	2016	New Mexico State
3	Pat Moore	2.5	2012	Nicholls State
	Montavious Williams	2.5	2013	Louisiana-Monroe

== Kicking ==
=== Field goals made ===
Career
Rank	Player	FGs	Years
1	Diego Guajardo	58	2019 2020 2021 2022 2023
2	Aleem Sunanon	49	2013 2014 2015
3	Gavin Patterson	35	2016 2017 2018
4	Michel Chapuseaux	25	2009 2010 2011 2012
5	Jordan Means	17	2010 2011 2012 2013
6	Laith Marjan	16	2024
7	Lawson McGlon	13	2009 2010 2011

Single season
Rank	Player	FGs	Year
1	Michel Chapuseaux	20	2012
2	Aleem Sunanon	18	2013
	Diego Guajardo	18	2022
4	Aleem Sunanon	16	2015
	Gavin Patterson	16	2017
	Laith Marjan	16	2024
7	Aleem Sunanon	15	2014
8	Diego Guajardo	14	2023
9	Jordan Means	13	2011
	Diego Guajardo	13	2020

Single game
Rank	Player	FGs	Year	Opponent
1	Lawson McGlon	4	2010	Lamar
	Lawson McGlon	4	2010	Georgia State
	Aleem Sunanon	4	2014	South Carolina

=== Field goal percentage ===
Career
Rank	Player	FG%	Years
1	Laith Marjan	94.1%	2024
2	Jordan Means	89.5%	2010 2011 2012 2013
3	Aleem Sunanon	81.7%	2013 2014 2015
4	Diego Guajardo	77.3%	2019 2020 2021 2022 2023
5	Michel Chapuseaux	73.5%	2009 2010 2011 2012
6	Gavin Patterson	72.9%	2016 2017 2018
7	Lawson McGlon	72.2%	2009 2010 2011

Single season
Rank	Player	FG%	Year
1	Diego Guajardo	94.7%	2022
2	Laith Marjan	94.1%	2024
3	Jordan Means	86.7%	2011
4	Aleem Sunanon	84.2%	2015
	Gavin Patterson	84.2%	2017
6	Aleem Sunanon	83.3%	2014
7	Michel Chapuseaux	80.0%	2009
8	Aleem Sunanon	78.3%	2013
9	Diego Guajardo	76.5%	2020
10	Michel Chapuseaux	74.1%	2012
