= List of South Alabama Jaguars football seasons =

This is a list of seasons completed by the South Alabama Jaguars football team of the National Collegiate Athletic Association (NCAA) Division I Football Bowl Subdivision, representing University of South Alabama in the West Division of the Sun Belt Conference. South Alabama has played their home games at Hancock Whitney Stadium in Mobile, Alabama since 2020.

== Season-by-season records ==
Year	Team	Overall	Conference	Standing	Bowl/playoffs	Coaches^{#}	AP^{°}
Joey Jones (Unclassified independent) (2009–2010)
2009	Jaguars	7–0					
2010	Jaguars	10–0					
Joey Jones (FCS independent) (2011)
2011	Jaguars	6–4					
Joey Jones (Sun Belt Conference) (2012–2017)
2012	Jaguars	2–11	1–7	10th			
2013	Jaguars	6–6	4–3	T–2nd			
2014	Jaguars	6–7	5–3	T–4th	L Camellia Bowl		
2015	Jaguars	5–7	3–5	T–5th			
2016	Jaguars	6–7	2–6	T–8th	L Arizona Bowl		
2017	Jaguars	4–8	3–5	T–8th			
Joey Jones:		52–50	18–29				
Steve Campbell (Sun Belt Conference) (2018–2020)
2018	Jaguars	3–9	2–6	4th (West)			
2019	Jaguars	2–10	1–7	5th (West)			
2020	Jaguars	4–7	3–5	2nd (West)			
Steve Campbell:		9–26	6–18				
Kane Wommack (Sun Belt Conference) (2021–2023)
2021	Jaguars	5–7	2–6	T–3rd (West)			
2022	Jaguars	10–3	7–1	T–1st (West)	L New Orleans Bowl		
2023	Jaguars	7–6	4–4	T–2nd (West)	W 68 Ventures Bowl		
Kane Wommack:		22–16	13–11				
Major Applewhite (Sun Belt Conference) (2024–present)
2024	Jaguars	7–6	5–3	T–2nd (West)	W Salute to Veterans Bowl		
2025	Jaguars	4-8	3-5	T–5th (West)			
Major Applewhite:		11-14	8-8				
Total:		94–106 (.470)					
National championship Conference title Conference division title or championship game berth
^{†}Indicates Bowl Coalition, Bowl Alliance, BCS, or CFP / New Years' Six bowl.; ^{#}Coaches Poll.; ^{°}Rankings from final AP Poll.
