= 2022 New Orleans Bowl =

Postseason college football bowl game

2022 R+L Carriers New Orleans Bowl
- 22nd New Orleans Bowl
| Western Kentucky Hilltoppers | South Alabama Jaguars |
| (8–5) | (10–2) |
| C-USA | Sun Belt |
| 44 | 23 |
| Head coach: Tyson Helton | Head coach: Kane Wommack |
| | 1 | 2 | 3 | 4 | Total |
|---|---|---|---|---|---|
| Western Kentucky | 14 | 17 | 10 | 3 | 44 |
| South Alabama | 0 | 3 | 14 | 6 | 23 |
- Date: December 21, 2022
- Season: 2022
- Stadium: Caesars Superdome
- Location: New Orleans, Louisiana, United States
- MVP: Austin Reed (QB, Western Kentucky)
- Favorite: South Alabama by 4
- Referee: Cal McNeill (Mountain West)
- Attendance: 13,456
- Payout: US$825,000

United States TV coverage
- Network: ESPN
- Announcers: Wes Durham (play-by-play), Roddy Jones (analyst), and Taylor Davis (sideline)

International TV coverage
- Network: ESPN Deportes

The 2022 New Orleans Bowl was a college football bowl game played on December 21, 2022, at Caesars Superdome in New Orleans, Louisiana, United States. The 22nd annual New Orleans Bowl, the game featured Western Kentucky from Conference USA (C-USA) and South Alabama from the Sun Belt Conference. The game began at 8:06 p.m. CST and aired on ESPN. It was one of the 2022–23 bowl games concluding the 2022 FBS football season. Sponsored by freight shipping company R+L Carriers, the game was officially known as the R+L Carriers New Orleans Bowl.

Western Kentucky were the dominant team for much of the game, and they started quickly on offense with passing touchdowns on both of their first two drives, giving them a 14-point lead less than eight minutes into the game. Their lead grew to 24 points, with three Austin Reed passing touchdowns and a field goal by placekicker Cory Munson, before South Alabama scored their first points with a field goal of their own, which came with 98 seconds remaining in the first half. The teams performed more similarly in the second half, with each team trading touchdowns on their first drives of the third quarter and a later Western Kentucky field goal being answered by a South Alabama touchdown on the next series. After a pair of punts, another Western Kentucky field goal followed by another South Alabama touchdown marked the end of the scoring and left three drives before the end of the game with Western Kentucky having defeated South Alabama, 44–23, to win the game.

== Teams ==
The game featured the Western Kentucky Hilltoppers from Conference USA against the South Alabama Jaguars from the Sun Belt Conference. This was the second meeting between Western Kentucky and South Alabama; the Jaguars defeated the Hilltoppers, 31–24, on September 14, 2013, in Mobile in the only previous meeting between the teams. That season, both teams were members of the Sun Belt Conference; Western Kentucky joined Conference USA the next season.

=== South Alabama ===
The South Alabama Jaguars finished their regular season with a record of 10–2, going 7–1 in Sun Belt Conference games, which was their best season in school history at the FBS level (to which they have belonged since 2013). They entered with an 0–2 mark in bowl games, most recently having appeared in the 2016 Arizona Bowl.

=== Western Kentucky ===
The Western Kentucky Hilltoppers entered the game with a record of 8–5, and sporting a 6–2 record in Conference USA regular season games. The Hilltoppers finished tied for second place in the C–USA regular season standings with North Texas, but lost the tiebreaker based on head-to-head result. They made their ninth bowl game appearance at the FBS level (dating back to the 2012 Little Caesars Pizza Bowl), and most recently had appeared in the 2021 Boca Raton Bowl.

== Game summary ==
The New Orleans Bowl was televised by ESPN, with a commentary team of Wes Durham, Roddy Jones, and Taylor Davis. The ESPN Radio broadcast was commentated by Mike Corey and Forest Conoly. The game's officiating crew, representing the Mountain West Conference, was led by referee Cal McNeill and umpire Rod Tucker.

=== First half ===
Scheduled for a 8:00 p.m. CST start, the New Orleans Bowl began at 8:06 p.m. with Jacob Meeks's opening kickoff, returned to the Western Kentucky 25-yard-line. The Hilltoppers offense experienced quick success as they turned to the passing attack: after a false start prior to their first snap, quarterback Austin Reed passed to Malachi Corley for 16-yard gain, and later Davion Ervin-Poindexter rushed for 12 yards to gain another first down. On the next play, Western Kentucky scored the game's first points with a 44-yard pass from Reed to Dalvin Smith, with Cory Munson's extra point successful. South Alabama's first drive ended with a punt; despite a 10-yard rush by Carter Bradley to convert 3rd & 5 early on, their next series brought up another 3rd & 5 which they could not convert. Jack Brooks's punt went out for a touchback, giving Western Kentucky the ball back at their own 25-yard-line. WKU repeated their feat on their second drive with a 42-yard Reed-to-Smith pass that set up a 27-yard pass from Reed to Joey Beljan for a touchdown two plays later, putting the Hilltoppers up 14–0. South Alabama's next drive was the game's first three-and-out, as the Jaguars punted on 4th & 23 after being unable to dig out of a hole created by a 12-yard loss on their first play. The kick was fair caught at the South Alabama 48-yard-line, and Western Kentucky picked up a pair of first downs before a holding penalty set them back 10 yards. Reed rushed for 14 yards to bring up 4th & 3, but the 34-yard field goal was missed by Munson. South Alabama picked up possession at their own 20-yard-line following the miss, and the gained a first down in three plays with a total of 14 yards gained. After a 14-yard pass on the resulting first down, the Jaguars reached the Western Kentucky 44-yard-line before the end of the first quarter.

The second quarter started with 3rd & 2 for South Alabama, and they lost 2 yards on the play to set up 4th & 4. They attempted to go for it, but failed, gaining only 2 yards, and gave Western Kentucky the ball back at their own 44-yard-line. After a 31-yard rush by Michael Mathison on the Hilltoppers' first play, Dalvin Smith passed to Jaylen Hall for a 25-yard touchdown, increasing Western Kentucky's lead to 21 points. After the ensuing kickoff, which resulted in a touchback, South Alabama started well with a 7-yard rush by Braylon McReynolds but were set back by a holding penalty from which they were unable to recover. A sack immediately followed, and the Jaguars ultimately punted on 4th & 16. Western Kentucky's Malachi Corley began their next drive with a 3-yard rush, which was followed by a pair of Reed-to-Hall passes, first for 13 yards and then for 38 yards. Two incomplete passes eventually set up a fourth down, and Western Kentucky converted a 23-yard field goal to stretch their lead. The ensuing kickoff was returned by McReynolds to the South Alabama 24-yard-line, and quickly faced a third down but converted with a pass from Bradley to Devin Voisin for 8 yards. A 19-yard pass involving the same pair moved the ball later in the drive, and South Alabama advanced to the Western Kentucky 21-yard-line a few plays later. On 2nd & 6, Bradley's pass was intercepted in the end zone by Kaleb Oliver and returned to the Western Kentucky 30-yard-line, giving the Hilltoppers possession again. The Hilltoppers jumped on this opportunity with an early pass interference penalty against the Jaguars followed by Reed completions to Corley for 7 yards and Smith for 31 yards. On 3rd & 10 several plays later, Reed's pass to the end zone was intercepted by South Alabama's Yam Banks for a touchback. South Alabama was quick to take advantage of the Hilltopper turnover, with passes for gains of 12, 17, 15, and 16 yards in four of their first five plays, to reach the Western Kentucky 15-yard-line with under three minutes to play. After their next three plays resulted in three yards combined, the Jaguars attempted a 30-yard field goal which was made by placekicker Diego Guajardo to put South Alabama on the scoreboard for the first time. Western Kentucky got the ball back on their own 25-yard-line with 1:38 left on the clock, and moved down the field reaching South Alabama territory in four plays. They entered the red zone with a 20-yard pass from Reed to Mathison, and soon after faced 3rd & Goal from the South Alabama 1-yard-line. Their pass on that play was incomplete but they got an untimed down following a roughing the passer penalty and scored a touchdown on that play, putting them up 31–3 entering halftime.

=== Second half ===
South Alabama began the second half with possession and started their drive with a touchback. A face mask penalty advanced the ball fifteen yards and a sequence of passes by Bradley thereafter were completed to Jamaal Pritchett for 12 yards, La'Damian Webb for 14 yards, and Voisin for 14 yards, which moved South Alabama into the red zone. Two plays later, Bradley completed a pass to DJ Thomas-Jones for a gain of 10 yards and the Jaguars' first touchdown of the game. Western Kentucky responded with a touchdown of their own; after an 18-yard pass from Reed to Hall to reach midfield, Reed connected with Corley for a 39-yard passing score to return their lead to 28 points. South Alabama returned the ensuing kickoff to their own 38-yard-line, and reached the 50-yard-line in three plays. A pass interference penalty called against Western Kentucky's Kaleb Oliver moved the ball to the WKU 32-yard-line, though the Jaguars' offense stalled from there and they had to attempt a conversion on 4th & 5, though they failed as Bradley's pass was intercepted by Upton Stout and returned to the Hilltoppers 36-yard-line. Western Kentucky moved the ball quickly with a 34-yard pass from Reed to Erwin-Poindexter a few plays into the drive to move into the red zone, and several plays later Cory Munson made a 31-yard field goal to push WKU's lead to 31 points. A 47-yard pass from Bradley to Voisin on South Alabama's next drive put them in scoring position quickly, and Bradley passed to Webb just three plays later to score a touchdown, with the extra point coming afterwards from Guajardo. Western Kentucky found themselves in an unusual position on their next drive as they were unable to convert 3rd & 10 from their own 36-yard-line, gaining only 9 yards on the play, and Tom Ellard was brought on to punt for the first time, with the kick fair caught at the South Alabama 21-yard-line. South Alabama was not able to take advantage, though, as they suffered a sack on 3rd & 6 for a loss of 5 yards and punted the ball back to WKU following a three-and-out, ending the third quarter.

Western Kentucky began the fourth quarter with 1st & 10 on their own 30-yard-line, and soon after faced third-and-long, which Reed converted with a 13-yard pass to Smith. The two connected two plays later with an 11-yard pass to cross into South Alabama territory. Reed found Hall for 17 yards several plays later and four straight rushes by Markese Stepp advanced WKU to the South Alabama 13-yard-line. After an incomplete pass, the Hilltoppers made a field goal from 31 yards to make the score 44–17. South Alabama put together a drive of their own in response, with a 21-yard pass from Bradley to Caullin Lacy earning them a first down on their fourth play and a pass interference penalty on the next play advancing them 15 yards. On their next 2nd & 10, quarterback Desmond Trotter passed to Thomas-Jones for 17 yards to reach the red zone. Three plays later, on 3rd & 2 from the Western Kentucky 12-yard-line, Bradley connected with Voisin for a 12-yard passing touchdown, though Guajardo's extra point attempt was no good and Western Kentucky's lead was reduced to 19 points. Western Kentucky went three-and-out on their next drive, with Tom Ellard's punt being downed at the South Alabama 3-yard-line, and the Jaguars were able to drive back into Hilltopper territory, reaching midfield in seven plays with help from a trio of Bradley passes. The final of those three passes earned them a first down, but the resulting series would see their progress end as a sack on 2nd & 10 put them in a hole and another sack on 4th & 14 turned the ball over on downs. A 39-yard rush by Stepp for the Hilltoppers was the last meaningful play of the game, as Western Kentucky kneeled twice to run out the clock and secure their 44–23 victory.

=== Scoring summary ===
2022 R+L Carriers New Orleans Bowl

| Quarter | 1 | 2 | 3 | 4 | Total |
|---|---|---|---|---|---|
| Western Kentucky | 14 | 17 | 10 | 3 | 44 |
| South Alabama | 0 | 3 | 14 | 6 | 23 |

at Caesars Superdome • New Orleans, Louisiana

- Date: December 21, 2022
- Game time: 8:00 p.m. CST
- Game weather: n/a (game played indoors)
- Game attendance: 13,456
- Referee: Cal McNeill
- TV announcers (ESPN): Wes Durham (play-by-play), Roddy Jones (analyst), and Taylor Davis (sideline)
- Box score

Scoring summary

| Quarter | Time | Drive | | | Team | Scoring information | Score | |
| Quarter | Time | Plays | Yards | TOP | Team | Scoring information | Western Kentucky | South Alabama |
|---|---|---|---|---|---|---|---|---|
| 1 | 13:11 | 6 | 75 | 1:43 | WKU | Dalvin Smith 44-yard touchdown reception from Austin Reed, Cory Munson kick good | 7 | 0 |
| 1 | 8:46 | 5 | 80 | 1:36 | WKU | Joey Beljan 27-yard touchdown reception from Austin Reed, Cory Munson kick good | 14 | 0 |
| 2 | 13:44 | 3 | 56 | 0:32 | WKU | Jaylen Hall 25-yard touchdown reception from Dalvin Smith, Cory Munson kick good | 21 | 0 |
| 2 | 9:23 | 7 | 60 | 2:01 | WKU | 23-yard field goal by Cory Munson | 24 | 0 |
| 2 | 1:38 | 9 | 68 | 3:07 | USA | 30-yard field goal by Diego Guajardo | 24 | 3 |
| 2 | 0:00 | 10 | 75 | 1:38 | WKU | Malachi Corley 1-yard touchdown reception from Austin Reed, Cory Munson kick good | 31 | 3 |
| 3 | 12:57 | 7 | 75 | 2:03 | USA | DJ Thomas-Jones 10-yard touchdown reception from Carter Bradley, Diego Guajardo kick good | 31 | 10 |
| 3 | 11:19 | 6 | 74 | 1:32 | WKU | Malachi Corley 39-yard touchdown reception from Austin Reed, Cory Munson kick good | 38 | 10 |
| 3 | 5:05 | 9 | 51 | 3:16 | WKU | 31-yard field goal by Cory Munson | 41 | 10 |
| 3 | 3:12 | 5 | 66 | 1:46 | USA | La'Damian Webb 5-yard touchdown reception from Carter Bradley, Diego Guajardo kick good | 41 | 17 |
| 4 | 9:24 | 14 | 57 | 5:36 | WKU | 31-yard field goal by Cory Munson | 44 | 17 |
| 4 | 6:01 | 9 | 84 | 3:15 | USA | Devin Voisin 12-yard touchdown reception from Carter Bradley, Diego Guajardo kick failed (wide left) | 44 | 23 |
| "TOP" = time of possession. For other American football terms, see Glossary of American football. | | | | | | | 44 | 23 |

== Statistics ==
Team statistical comparison
| Statistic | Western Kentucky | South Alabama |
|---|---|---|
| First downs | 29 | 28 |
| First downs rushing | 7 | 4 |
| First downs passing | 21 | 20 |
| First downs penalty | 1 | 4 |
| Third down efficiency | 6–13 | 7–16 |
| Fourth down efficiency | 0–0 | 0–3 |
| Total plays–net yards | 82–677 | 80–421 |
| Rushing attempts–net yards | 26–155 | 25–44 |
| Yards per rush | 6.0 | 1.8 |
| Yards passing | 522 | 377 |
| Pass completions–attempts | 37–56 | 37–55 |
| Interceptions thrown | 1 | 2 |
| Punt returns–total yards | 0–0 | 0–0 |
| Kickoff returns–total yards | 2–43 | 4–105 |
| Punts–average yardage | 2–38.5 | 4–46.8 |
| Fumbles–lost | 0–0 | 1–0 |
| Penalties–yards | 7–70 | 3–26 |
| Time of possession | 28:44 | 31:16 |

Western Kentucky statistics
Hilltoppers passing
| | C–A | Yds | TD–INT |
|---|---|---|---|
| Austin Reed | 36–55 | 497 | 4–1 |
| Dalvin Smith | 1–1 | 25 | 1–0 |
Hilltoppers rushing
| | Car | Yds | TD |
| Markese Stepp | 7 | 63 | 0 |
| Davion Ervin-Poindexter | 9 | 33 | 0 |
| Michael Mathison | 1 | 31 | 0 |
| Austin Reed | 4 | 25 | 0 |
| Malachi Corley | 1 | 3 | 0 |
| L.T. Sanders | 2 | 2 | 0 |
| TEAM | 2 | −2 | 0 |
Hilltoppers receiving
| | Rec | Yds | TD |
| Dalvin Smith | 6 | 145 | 1 |
| Jaylen Hall | 9 | 138 | 1 |
| Malachi Corley | 11 | 114 | 2 |
| Joey Beljan | 3 | 42 | 1 |
| Michael Mathison | 3 | 35 | 0 |
| Davion Ervin-Poindexter | 3 | 33 | 0 |
| Joshua Simon | 2 | 15 | 0 |

South Alabama statistics
Jaguars passing
| | C–A | Yds | TD–INT |
|---|---|---|---|
| Carter Bradley | 36–53 | 360 | 3–2 |
| Desmond Trotter | 1–2 | 17 | 0–0 |
Jaguars rushing
| | Car | Yds | TD |
| La'Damian Webb | 12 | 48 | 0 |
| Braylon McReynolds | 4 | 15 | 0 |
| Omni Wells | 2 | 8 | 0 |
| Carter Bradley | 5 | −5 | 0 |
| Desmond Trotter | 1 | −10 | 0 |
| TEAM | 1 | −12 | 0 |
Jaguars receiving
| | Rec | Yds | TD |
| Devin Voisin | 11 | 153 | 1 |
| Caullin Lacy | 7 | 57 | 0 |
| DJ Thomas-Jones | 4 | 45 | 1 |
| Braylon McReynolds | 4 | 38 | 0 |
| La'Damian Reynolds | 4 | 29 | 1 |
| Jamaal Pritchett | 4 | 24 | 0 |
| Jalen Wayne | 2 | 22 | 0 |
| Omni Wells | 2 | 7 | 0 |
| Lincoln Sefcik | 1 | 2 | 0 |

== Aftermath ==
The win bumped Western Kentucky's final record to 9–5, and South Alabama fell to 10–3 with the loss. Austin Reed's 497 passing yards set a new New Orleans Bowl record, and he finished the season with 4,744 passing yards and 40 passing touchdowns. He was awarded most valuable player for his performance. The game's prolific passing offense did not just come from Western Kentucky; both teams combined for 74 completed passes, which tied an NCAA bowl game record. The Hilltoppers also set a New Orleans Bowl record by becoming the first team in the bowl's history to have three receivers total over 100 yards.

== See also ==
- 2022 Sugar Bowl (December), contested at the same venue on December 31
