= 2015 Troy Trojans football team =

American college football season

2015 Troy Trojans football
- Conference: Sun Belt Conference
- Record: 4–8 (3–5 Sun Belt)
- Head coach: Neal Brown (1st season)
- Offensive coordinator: Kenny Edenfield (6th season)
- Offensive scheme: Spread
- Defensive coordinator: Vic Koenning (3rd season)
- Base defense: 3–3–5
- Home stadium: Veterans Memorial Stadium

2015 Sun Belt Conference football standings
	Conf.			Overall
Team	W		L	W		L
Arkansas State $	8	–	0	9	–	4
Appalachian State	7	–	1	11	–	2
Georgia Southern	6	–	2	9	–	4
Georgia State	5	–	3	6	–	7
South Alabama	3	–	5	5	–	7
Idaho	3	–	5	4	–	8
Louisiana–Lafayette	3	–	5	4	–	8
Troy	3	–	5	4	–	8
New Mexico State	3	–	5	3	–	9
Texas State	2	–	6	3	–	9
Louisiana–Monroe	1	–	7	2	–	11
$ – Conference champion

The 2015 Troy Trojans football team represented Troy University in the 2015 NCAA Division I FBS football season. They were led by first-year head coach Neal Brown and played their home games at Veterans Memorial Stadium in Troy, Alabama. The Trojans were members of the Sun Belt Conference. They finished the season 4–8, 3–5 in Sun Belt play to finish in a five-way tie for fifth place.

== Schedule ==
Troy announced their 2015 football schedule on February 27, 2015. The 2015 schedule consist of five home and seven away games in the regular season. The Trojans will host Sun Belt foes Georgia Southern, Idaho, Louisiana–Monroe, and South Alabama, and will travel to Appalachian State, Georgia State, Louisiana–Lafayette, and New Mexico State.

Date	Time	Opponent	Site	TV	Result	Attendance
September 5	6:00 pm	at NC State*	Carter–Finley Stadium; Raleigh, NC	ESPN3	L 21–49	57,451
September 12	6:00 pm	Charleston Southern*	Veterans Memorial Stadium; Troy, AL	ESPN3	W 44–16	17,517
September 19	2:30 pm	at No. 24 Wisconsin*	Camp Randall Stadium; Madison, WI	BTN	L 3–28	77,157
October 3	6:00 pm	South Alabama	Veterans Memorial Stadium; Troy, AL (rivalry)	ESPN3	L 18–24	22,873
October 10	3:00 pm	at Mississippi State*	Davis Wade Stadium; Starkville, MS	SECN	L 17–45	60,866
October 17	2:30 pm	Idaho^{†}	Veterans Memorial Stadium; Troy, AL	ESPN3	L 16–19	20,107
October 24	7:00 pm	at New Mexico State	Aggie Memorial Stadium; Las Cruces, NM	ESPN3	W 52–7	10,325
October 31	2:30 pm	at Appalachian State	Kidd Brewer Stadium; Boone, NC	ESPN3	L 41–44 ^{3OT}	26,130
November 7	2:30 pm	Louisiana–Monroe	Veterans Memorial Stadium; Troy, AL	ESPN3	W 51–14	18,041
November 14	2:30 pm	Georgia Southern	Veterans Memorial Stadium; Troy, AL	ESPN3	L 10–45	18,455
November 27	1:00 pm	at Georgia State	Georgia Dome; Atlanta, GA	ESPN3	L 21–31	10,113
December 5th	4:00 pm	at Louisiana	Cajun Field; Lafayette, LA	ESPN3	W 41–17	22,264
*Non-conference game; ^{†}Homecoming; Rankings from AP Poll released prior to the game; All times are in Central time

== Game summaries ==
=== at NC State ===
	1	2	3	4	Total
Trojans	7	7	7	0	21
Wolfpack	14	14	14	7	49

=== Charleston Southern ===
	1	2	3	4	Total
Buccaneers	7	2	0	7	16
Trojans	14	7	6	17	44

=== at Wisconsin ===
	1	2	3	4	Total
Trojans	3	0	0	0	3
#24 Badgers	7	7	7	7	28

=== South Alabama ===
	1	2	3	4	Total
Jaguars	14	7	3	0	24
Trojans	8	7	0	3	18

=== at Mississippi State ===
	1	2	3	4	Total
Trojans	0	0	14	3	17
Bulldogs	21	17	0	7	45

=== Idaho ===
	1	2	3	4	Total
Vandals	0	6	10	3	19
Trojans	0	0	3	13	16

=== at New Mexico State ===
	1	2	3	4	Total
Trojans	21	24	7	0	52
Aggies	0	7	0	0	7

=== at Appalachian State ===
	1	2	3	4	OT	Total
Trojans	7	3	14	7	10	41
Mountaineers	14	3	14	0	13	44

=== Louisiana–Monroe ===
	1	2	3	4	Total
Warhawks	14	0	0	0	14
Trojans	27	21	3	0	51

=== Georgia Southern ===
	1	2	3	4	Total
Eagles	10	14	7	14	45
Trojans	10	0	0	0	10

=== at Georgia State ===
	1	2	3	4	Total
Trojans	0	7	7	7	21
Panthers	7	10	14	0	31

=== at Louisiana–Lafayette ===
	1	2	3	4	Total
Trojans	24	0	17	0	41
Ragin' Cajuns	0	10	7	0	17
