= 2015 Appalachian State Mountaineers football team =

American college football season

2015 Appalachian State Mountaineers football

Camellia Bowl champion

Camellia Bowl, W 31–29 vs. Ohio
- Conference: Sun Belt Conference
- Record: 11–2 (7–1 Sun Belt)
- Head coach: Scott Satterfield (3rd season)
- Co-offensive coordinators: Frank Ponce (3rd season); Dwayne Ledford (3rd season)
- Offensive scheme: Spread option
- Defensive coordinator: Nate Woody (3rd season)
- Base defense: 3–4
- Home stadium: Kidd Brewer Stadium

2015 Sun Belt Conference football standings
	Conf.			Overall
Team	W		L	W		L
Arkansas State $	8	–	0	9	–	4
Appalachian State	7	–	1	11	–	2
Georgia Southern	6	–	2	9	–	4
Georgia State	5	–	3	6	–	7
South Alabama	3	–	5	5	–	7
Idaho	3	–	5	4	–	8
Louisiana–Lafayette	3	–	5	4	–	8
Troy	3	–	5	4	–	8
New Mexico State	3	–	5	3	–	9
Texas State	2	–	6	3	–	9
Louisiana–Monroe	1	–	7	2	–	11
$ – Conference champion

The 2015 Appalachian State Mountaineers football team represented Appalachian State University in the 2015 NCAA Division I FBS football season. They were led by third-year head coach Scott Satterfield and played their home games at Kidd Brewer Stadium in Boone, North Carolina. This season was the Mountaineers second season in the Sun Belt Conference, and their first as a full, bowl-eligible member of the Football Bowl Subdivision. They finished the season 11–2, 7–1 in Sun Belt play to finish in second place. They were invited to their first ever bowl game, the Camellia Bowl, where they defeated Ohio.

== Schedule ==
Appalachian State announced their 2015 football schedule on February 27, 2015. The 2015 schedule consisted of six home and away games in the regular season. The Mountaineers hosted Sun Belt foes Arkansas State, Georgia Southern, Louisiana–Lafayette, and Troy, and travelled to Georgia State, Idaho, Louisiana–Monroe, and South Alabama.

Date	Time	Opponent	Site	TV	Result	Attendance
September 5	3:30 p.m.	Howard*	Kidd Brewer Stadium; Boone, NC	App State TV, ESPN3	W 49–0	24,314
September 12	12:30 p.m.	at No. 12 Clemson*	Memorial Stadium; Clemson, SC	ESPN3	L 10–41	81,467
September 26	3:30 p.m.	at Old Dominion*	Foreman Field; Norfolk, VA	ASN	W 49–0	20,118
October 3	3:30 p.m.	Wyoming*^{†}	Kidd Brewer Stadium; Boone, NC	ESPN3	W 31–13	19,345
October 10	3:30 p.m.	at Georgia State	Georgia Dome; Atlanta, GA	ESPN3	W 37–3	10,101
October 17	7:00 p.m.	at Louisiana–Monroe	Malone Stadium; Monroe, LA	ESPN3	W 59–14	11,767
October 22	7:30 p.m.	Georgia Southern	Kidd Brewer Stadium; Boone, NC (rivalry)	ESPNU	W 31–13	24,121
October 31	3:30 p.m.	Troy	Kidd Brewer Stadium; Boone, NC	ESPN3	W 44–41 ^{3OT}	26,130
November 5	7:30 p.m.	Arkansas State	Kidd Brewer Stadium; Boone, NC	ESPNU	L 27–40	18,721
November 14	5:00 p.m.	at Idaho	Kibbie Dome; Moscow, ID	ESPN3	W 47–20	10,113
November 28	2:00 p.m.	Louisiana–Lafayette	Kidd Brewer Stadium; Boone, NC	ESPN3	W 28–7	16,124
December 5	7:30 p.m.	at South Alabama	Ladd–Peebles Stadium; Mobile, AL	ESPN3	W 34–27	12,346
December 19	5:30 p.m.	vs. Ohio*	Cramton Bowl; Montgomery, AL (Camellia Bowl)	ESPN	W 31–29	19,621
*Non-conference game; ^{†}Homecoming; Rankings from AP Poll released prior to the game; All times are in Eastern time

== Game summaries ==
=== Howard ===
	1	2	3	4	Total
Bison	0	0	0	0	0
Mountaineers	7	21	21	0	49

=== At Clemson ===
	1	2	3	4	Total
Mountaineers	0	0	3	7	10
#12 Tigers	3	28	7	3	41

=== At Old Dominion ===
	1	2	3	4	Total
Mountaineers	7	28	14	0	49
Monarchs	0	0	0	0	0

=== Wyoming ===
	1	2	3	4	Total
Cowboys	0	7	0	6	13
Mountaineers	14	7	7	3	31

=== At Georgia State ===
	1	2	3	4	Total
Mountaineers	17	3	10	7	37
Panthers	0	3	0	0	3

=== At Louisiana–Monroe ===
	1	2	3	4	Total
Mountaineers	10	14	21	14	59
Warhawks	7	7	0	0	14

=== Georgia Southern ===
	1	2	3	4	Total
Eagles	7	0	0	6	13
Mountaineers	3	14	7	7	31

=== Troy ===
	1	2	3	4	OT	Total
Trojans	7	3	14	7	10	41
Mountaineers	14	3	14	0	13	44

=== Arkansas State ===
	1	2	3	4	Total
Red Wolves	14	3	17	6	40
Mountaineers	14	7	0	6	27

=== At Idaho ===
	1	2	3	4	Total
Mountaineers	7	14	14	12	47
Vandals	7	6	0	7	20

=== Louisiana–Lafayette ===
	1	2	3	4	Total
Ragin' Cajuns	0	0	0	7	7
Mountaineers	7	7	7	7	28

=== At South Alabama ===
	1	2	3	4	Total
Mountaineers	14	10	0	10	34
Jaguars	7	0	10	10	27

=== Ohio–Camellia Bowl ===
	1	2	3	4	Total
Bobcats	0	17	7	5	29
Mountaineers	7	0	0	24	31
