= 2019 South Alabama Jaguars football team =

American college football season

2019 South Alabama Jaguars football
- Conference: Sun Belt Conference
- West Division
- Record: 2–10 (1–7 Sun Belt)
- Head coach: Steve Campbell (2nd season)
- Offensive coordinator: Kenny Edenfield (2nd season)
- Offensive scheme: Spread
- Defensive coordinator: Greg Stewart (2nd season)
- Base defense: 4–3
- Home stadium: Ladd–Peebles Stadium

2019 Sun Belt Conference football standings
	Conf.			Overall
Team	W		L	W		L
East Division
No. 19 Appalachian State x$	7	–	1	13	–	1
Georgia Southern	5	–	3	7	–	6
Georgia State	4	–	4	7	–	6
Troy	3	–	5	5	–	7
Coastal Carolina	2	–	6	5	–	7
West Division
Louisiana x	7	–	1	11	–	3
Arkansas State	5	–	3	8	–	5
Louisiana–Monroe	4	–	4	5	–	7
Texas State	2	–	6	3	–	9
South Alabama	1	–	7	2	–	10
Championship: Appalachian State 45, Louisiana 38
$ – Conference champion; x – Division champion/co-champions; Rankings from AP Poll

The 2019 South Alabama Jaguars football team represented the University of South Alabama in the 2019 NCAA Division I FBS football season. The Jaguars played their home games at Ladd–Peebles Stadium in Mobile, Alabama, and competed in the West Division of the Sun Belt Conference. They were led by second-year head coach Steve Campbell.

The season was the Jaguars' final season at Ladd–Peebles Stadium, where the Jaguars played since their first season in 2009. The university is scheduled to open a new on-campus venue, Hancock Whitney Stadium, for the 2020 season.

== Schedule ==
Date	Time	Opponent	Site	TV	Result	Attendance
August 31	11:00 a.m.	at No. 24 Nebraska*	Memorial Stadium; Lincoln, NE	ESPN	L 21–35	89,502
September 7	6:00 p.m.	Jackson State*	Ladd–Peebles Stadium; Mobile, AL	ESPN+	W 37–14	14,511
September 14	2:30 p.m.	Memphis*	Ladd–Peebles Stadium; Mobile, AL	ESPNU	L 6–42	12,373
September 21	3:30 p.m.	at UAB*	Legion Field; Birmingham, AL	NFLN	L 3–35	27,932
September 28	6:00 p.m.	at Louisiana–Monroe	Malone Stadium; Monroe, LA	ESPN+	L 17–30	16,222
October 3	6:30 p.m.	Georgia Southern	Ladd–Peebles Stadium; Mobile, AL	ESPNU	L 17–20 ^{2OT}	20,013
October 16	7:00 p.m.	at Troy	Veterans Memorial Stadium; Troy, AL (Battle for the Belt)	ESPN2	L 13–37	23,182
October 26	11:00 a.m.	No. 21 Appalachian State^{†}	Ladd–Peebles Stadium; Mobile, AL	ESPNU	L 3–30	17,969
November 9	2:00 p.m.	at Texas State	Bobcat Stadium; San Marcos, TX	ESPN3	L 28–30	15,473
November 16	4:00 p.m.	Louisiana	Ladd–Peebles Stadium; Mobile, AL	ESPN+	L 27–37	16,748
November 23	1:00 p.m.	at Georgia State	Georgia State Stadium; Atlanta, GA	ESPN+	L 15–28	12,501
November 29	4:00 p.m.	Arkansas State	Ladd–Peebles Stadium; Mobile, AL	ESPN+	W 34–30	16,319
*Non-conference game; ^{†}Homecoming; Rankings from AP Poll and CFP Rankings after November 5 released prior to game; All times are in Central time

== Personnel ==
=== Coaching staff ===
Name	Position	Season
Steve Campbell	Head coach	2nd
Michael Bangtson	Offensive Line,	1st
Kenny Edenfield	OC, Quarterbacks	2nd
Greg Stewart	DC, linebackers	2nd
Harland Bower	Defensive tackles	1st
Pete Bennett	Wide receivers/Recruiting Coordinator	1st
Larry Hart	Outside linebackers	1st
Josh Jones	Cornerbacks	1st
Larry Warner	Running backs	1st
Matt Kitchens	Safeties	1st
Chad Huff	Tight Ends	1st
Lance Ancar	Strength and Conditioning Coach	2nd
Mark Hewes	Director of Operations	1st
Chase Calcagni	Director of Player Personnel	1st

== Game summaries ==
=== At No. 24 Nebraska ===
	1	2	3	4	Total
Jaguars	7	0	14	0	21
No. 24 Cornhuskers	7	7	14	7	35

=== Jackson State ===
	1	2	3	4	Total
Tigers	7	0	0	7	14
Jaguars	13	6	6	10	35

=== Memphis ===
	1	2	3	4	Total
Tigers	7	16	7	12	42
Jaguars	0	0	0	6	6

=== At UAB ===
	1	2	3	4	Total
Jaguars	3	0	0	0	3
Blazers	14	14	7	0	35

=== At Louisiana–Monroe ===
Week Five: South Alabama Jaguars at Louisiana–Monroe Warhawks – Game summary

Quarter	1	2	3	4	Total
Jaguars	7	0	3	7	17
Warhawks	7	10	0	13	30

at Malone Stadium • Monroe, LA

- Date: September 28
- Game time: 6:00 p.m. CDT
- Game weather: 91° · Wind – S 9 · Sunny
- Game attendance: 16,222
- Referee: Jeremy Parker
- TV announcers (ESPN+): Lyn Rollins (play-by-play), Chris Mycoskie (color analyst) and Wayne Gentry (producer)

Game information

First quarter

- (07:39) USA TD – Cephus Johnson 3-yard rush, Frankie Onate kick
  South Alabama 7–0; Drive: 12 plays, 90 yards, 5:39
- (06:10) ULM TD – Josh Pederson 20-yard pass from Caleb Evans, Jared Porter kick
  Tied 7–7; Drive: 4 plays, 75 yards, 1:29

Second quarter

- (09:34) ULM FG – Jared Porter 22-yard field goal
  Louisiana–Monroe 10–7; Drive: 11 plays, 75 yards, 5:20
- (04:12) ULM TD – Markis McCray 52-yard pass from Caleb Evans, Jared Porter kick
  Louisiana–Monroe 17–7; Drive: 4 plays, 72 yards, 1:45

Third quarter

- (08:27) USA FG – Frankie Onate 21-yard field goal
  Louisiana–Monroe 17–10; Drive: 9 plays, 55 yards, 3:51

Fourth quarter

- (13:00) ULM TD – Jonathan Hodoh 21-yard pass from Caleb Evans, Jared Porter PAT failed
  Louisiana–Monroe 23–10; Drive: 9 plays, 61 yards, 3:06
- (07:02) ULM TD – Caleb Evans 13-yard rush, Jared Porter kick
  Louisiana–Monroe 30–10; Drive: 9 plays, 75 yards, 3:30
- (03:00) USA TD – Cephus Johnson 8-yard rush, Frankie Onate kick
  Louisiana–Monroe 30–17; Drive: 11 plays, 75 yards, 4:02

Leading Passers

- USA – Cephus Johnson – 14/26, 114 yards, INT
- ULM – Caleb Evans – 17/25, 286 yards, 3 TD

Leading Rushers

- USA – Trae Minter – 19 carries, 150 yards
- ULM – Josh Johnson – 15 carries, 93 yards

Leading Receivers

- USA – Jalen Tolbert – 4 receptions, 44 yards
- ULM – Markis McCray – 3 receptions, 70 yards, TD

Statistics	South Alabama Jaguars	Louisiana–Monroe
First downs	24	18
Total yards	377	428
Rushing yards	263	142
Passing yards	114	286
Turnovers	1	0
Time of possession	35:35	24:25

=== Georgia Southern ===
	1	2	3	4	OT	2OT	Total
Eagles	0	10	0	7	0	3	20
Jaguars	0	7	7	3	0	0	17

=== At Troy ===
	1	2	3	4	Total
Jaguars	3	7	3	0	13
Trojans	3	13	7	14	37

=== No. 21 Appalachian State ===
	1	2	3	4	Total
No. 21 Mountaineers	7	6	10	7	30
Jaguars	0	0	0	3	3

=== At Texas State ===
South Alabama at Texas State – Game summary

Quarter	1	2	3	4	Total
Jaguars	7	7	7	7	28
Bobcats	3	10	14	3	30

at Bobcat Stadium, San Marcos, TX

- Date: November 9
- Game time: 2:00 p.m. CDT
- Game attendance: 15,473
- Referee: Jason Autrey
- TV announcers (ESPN3): Brant Freeman (play-by-play), Joplo Bartu (analyst) and Brooke Shoemaker (sideline)

Game information

First quarter

- (09:49) TXST FG – Joshua Rowland 20-yard field goal
  Texas State 3–0; Drive: 9 plays, 47 yards, 3:16
- (01:47) USA TD – Carlos Davis 3-yard rush, Frankie Onate kick
  South Alabama 7–3; Drive: 9 plays, 77 yards, 4:13

Second quarter

- (12:03) TXST FG – Joshua Rowland 41-yard field goal
  South Alabama 7–6; Drive: 11 plays, 52 yards, 4:37
- (03:09) TXST TD – Javen Banks 40-yard pass from Tyler Vitt, Joshua Rowland kick
  Texas State 13–7; Drive: 8 plays, 92 yards, 3:51
- (00:35) USA TD – Davyn Flenord 22-yard pass from Desmond Trotter, Frankie Onate kick
  South Alabama 14–13; Drive: 9 plays, 78 yards, 2:26

Third quarter

- (12:24) TXST TD – Trevis Graham Jr. 38-yard pass from Tyler Vitt, Joshua Rowland kick
  Texas State 20–14; Drive: 6 plays, 75 yards, 2:36
- (07:07) USA TD – Jalen Wayne 8-yard pass from Desmond Trotter, Frankie Onate kick
  South Alabama 21–20; Drive: 11 plays, 75 yards, 5:17
- (04:36) TXST TD – Trevis Graham Jr. 17-yard pass from Tyler Vitt, Joshua Rowland kick
  Texas State 27–21; Drive: 6 plays, 60 yards, 2:23

Fourth quarter

- (09:57) USA TD – Tra Minter 6-yard rush, Frankie Onate kick
  South Alabama 28–27; Drive: 12 plays, 73 yards, 5:40
- (06:14) TXST FG – Joshua Rowland 31-yard field goal
  Texas State 30–28; Drive: 7 plays, 21 yards, 3:30

Top passers

- USA – Desmond Trotter – 13/17, 164 yards, 2 TD
- TXST – Tyler Vitt – 23/33, 373 yards, 3 TD, INT

Top rushers

- USA – Tra Minter – 21 carries, 87 yards, TD
- TXST – Tyler Vitt – 11 carries, 42 yards

Top receivers

- USA – Kawaan Baker – 4 receptions, 34 yards
- TXST – Hutch White – 10 receptions, 165 yards

Statistics	South Alabama	Texas State
First downs	20	21
Total yards	348	415
Rushing yards	184	42
Passing yards	164	373
Turnovers	0	2
Time of possession	30:00	30:00

=== Louisiana ===
Louisiana at South Alabama

Team	1	2	3	4	Total
• Ragin' Cajuns	3	14	6	14	37
Jaguars	7	7	7	6	27

- Date: November 16, 2019
- Location: Ladd–Peebles Stadium
  Mobile, AL
- Game start: 4:00 p.m. CST
- Elapsed time: 3 hours and 24 minutes
- Game attendance: 16,748
- Game weather: 62 °F (17 °C) • Weather: Sunny • Wind: 8 NNW MPH
- Referee: Marshall Lewis
- Television network: ESPN+

Scoring summary
1	09:16	LA	Stevie Artigue 22–yard field goal (15 plays, 66 yards, 5:44)	LA 3–0
1	06:28	USA	Carlos Davis 20–yard rush (Frankie Onate kick) (6 plays, 71 yards, 2:48)	USA 7–3
2	14:19	LA	Neal Johnson 9–yard pass from Levi Lewis (Stevie Artigue kick) (11 plays, 69 yards, 4:28)	LA 10–7
2	09:44	USA	Jared Wilson 4–yard rush (Frankie Onate kick) (8 plays, 75 yards, 4:35)	USA 14–10
2	07:30	LA	Hunter Bergeron 1–yard pass from Levi Lewis (Stevie Artigue kick) (6 plays, 36 yards, 2:14)	LA 17–14
3	09:51	USA	Kawaan Baker 0–yard fumble recovered and returned (Frankie Onate kick) (0 plays, 0 yards, 0:00)	USA 21–17
3	06:41	LA	Stevie Artigue 25–yard field goal (8 plays, 59 yards, 3:10)	USA 21–20
3	02:44	LA	Stevie Artigue 20–yard field goal (4 plays, 2 yards, 1:40)	LA 23–21
4	07:51	LA	Elijah Mitchell 1–yard rush (Stevie Artigue kick) (17 plays, 85 yards, 7:12)	LA 30–21
4	04:12	LA	Trey Ragas 23–yard rush (Stevie Artigue kick) (3 plays, 47 yards, 1:12)	LA 37–21
4	02:48	USA	Tra Minter 11–yard rush (Desmond Trotter two–point conversion attempt failed) (4 plays, 75 yards, 1:24)	LA 37–27

Statistics	Louisiana	South Alabama
First downs	23	23
Total yards	391	467
Rushing yards	255	351
Passing yards	136	116
Turnovers	1	0
Time of possession	30:02	29:58

Team	Category	Player	Statistics
Louisiana	Passing	Levi Lewis	16–29, 136 yards, 2 TD
Louisiana	Rushing	Elijah Mitchell	17 carries, 117 yards, 1 TD
Louisiana	Receiving	Jamal Bell	3 receptions, 51 yards
South Alabama	Passing	Desmond Trotter	8–15, 116 yards
South Alabama	Rushing	Tra Minter	22 carries, 137 yards, 1 TD
South Alabama	Receiving	Cade Sutherland	3 receptions, 64 yards

=== At Georgia State ===
	1	2	3	4	Total
Jaguars	3	0	0	12	15
Panthers	0	14	7	7	28

=== Arkansas State ===
	1	2	3	4	Total
Red Wolves	7	0	10	13	30
Jaguars	14	0	6	14	34
