= 2015 Texas State Bobcats football team =

American college football season

2015 Texas State Bobcats football
- Conference: Sun Belt Conference
- Record: 3–9 (2–6 Sun Belt)
- Head coach: Dennis Franchione (7th overall season)
- Co-offensive coordinators: Mike Schultz (5th season); Jeff Conway (4th season)
- Offensive scheme: Multiple
- Defensive coordinator: John Thompson (2nd season)
- Base defense: Multiple
- Home stadium: Bobcat Stadium

2015 Sun Belt Conference football standings
	Conf.			Overall
Team	W		L	W		L
Arkansas State $	8	–	0	9	–	4
Appalachian State	7	–	1	11	–	2
Georgia Southern	6	–	2	9	–	4
Georgia State	5	–	3	6	–	7
South Alabama	3	–	5	5	–	7
Idaho	3	–	5	4	–	8
Louisiana–Lafayette	3	–	5	4	–	8
Troy	3	–	5	4	–	8
New Mexico State	3	–	5	3	–	9
Texas State	2	–	6	3	–	9
Louisiana–Monroe	1	–	7	2	–	11
$ – Conference champion

The 2015 Texas State Bobcats football team represented Texas State University in the 2015 NCAA Division I FBS football season. They were led by Dennis Franchione in the fifth year of his second stint as head coach, 7th overall, and played their home games at Bobcat Stadium in San Marcos, Texas. The Bobcats were members of the Sun Belt Conference. They finished the season 3–9, 2–6 in Sun Belt play to finish in tenth place.

== Schedule ==
Texas State announced their 2015 football schedule on February 27, 2015. The 2015 schedule consist of six home and away games in the regular season. The Bobcats will host Sun Belt foes Georgia State, New Mexico State, Louisiana–Monroe, and South Alabama, and will travel to Arkansas State, Georgia Southern, Idaho, and Louisiana–Lafayette.

Date	Time	Opponent	Site	TV	Result	Attendance
September 5	7:00 pm	at No. 10 Florida State*	Doak Campbell Stadium; Tallahassee, FL	ESPNews	L 16–59	80,917
September 12	6:00 pm	Prairie View A&M*	Bobcat Stadium; San Marcos, TX	ESPN3	W 63–24	24,561
September 19	6:00 pm	Southern Miss*	Bobcat Stadium; San Marcos, TX	ESPN3	L 50–56	27,252
September 26	7:00 pm	at Houston*	TDECU Stadium; Houston, TX	ESPN3	L 14–59	35,257
October 10	6:00 pm	at Louisiana–Lafayette	Cajun Field; Lafayette, LA	ESPN3	L 27–49	21,377
October 24	6:00 pm	South Alabama	Bobcat Stadium; San Marcos, TX	TWCS	W 36–18	14,523
October 29	6:30 pm	at Georgia Southern	Paulson Stadium; Statesboro, GA	ESPNU	L 13–37	14,212
November 7	3:00 pm	New Mexico State^{†}	Bobcat Stadium; San Marcos, TX	ESPN3	L 21–31	15,421
November 14	3:00 pm	Georgia State	Bobcat Stadium; San Marcos, TX	TWCS	L 19–41	13,328
November 19	8:30 pm	Louisiana–Monroe	Bobcat Stadium; San Marcos, TX	ESPNU	W 16–3	14,003
November 28	4:00 pm	at Idaho	Kibbie Dome; Moscow, ID	ESPN3	L 31–38	8,893
December 5	2:00 pm	at Arkansas State	Centennial Bank Stadium; Jonesboro, AR	ESPN3	L 17–55	20,143
*Non-conference game; ^{†}Homecoming; Rankings from AP Poll released prior to the game; All times are in Central time

== Game summaries ==
=== At Florida State ===
	1	2	3	4	Total
Bobcats	0	10	0	6	16
#10 Seminoles	14	7	14	24	59

=== Prairie View A&M ===
	1	2	3	4	Total
Panthers	3	14	0	7	24
Bobcats	35	21	7	0	63

=== Southern Miss ===
	1	2	3	4	Total
Golden Eagles	14	7	21	14	56
Bobcats	3	22	3	22	50

=== At Houston ===
	1	2	3	4	Total
Bobcats	7	0	0	7	14
Cougars	14	28	10	7	59

=== At Louisiana–Lafayette ===
	1	2	3	4	Total
Bobcats	7	7	7	6	27
Ragin' Cajuns	7	7	28	7	49

=== South Alabama ===
	1	2	3	4	Total
Jaguars	3	0	7	8	18
Texas State	0	19	7	10	36

=== At Georgia Southern ===
	1	2	3	4	Total
Bobcats	0	6	7	0	13
Eagles	7	7	10	13	37

=== New Mexico State ===
	1	2	3	4	Total
Aggies	7	3	7	14	31
Bobcats	0	14	0	7	21

=== Georgia State ===
	1	2	3	4	Total
Panthers	14	17	7	3	41
Bobcats	6	6	0	7	19

=== Louisiana–Monroe ===
	1	2	3	4	Total
Warhawks	3	0	0	0	3
Bobcats	3	7	0	6	16

=== At Idaho ===
	1	2	3	4	Total
Bobcats	3	14	7	7	31
Vandals	7	17	0	14	38

=== At Arkansas State ===
	1	2	3	4	Total
Bobcats	0	7	3	7	17
Red Wolves	14	13	14	14	55
