= 2015 Georgia State Panthers football team =

American college football season

2015 Georgia State Panthers football

Cure Bowl, L 16–27 vs. San Jose State
- Conference: Sun Belt Conference
- Record: 6–7 (5–3 Sun Belt)
- Head coach: Trent Miles (3rd season)
- Offensive coordinator: Jeff Jagodzinski (3rd season)
- Offensive scheme: Multiple
- Defensive coordinator: Jesse Minter (3rd season)
- Base defense: 4–3
- Home stadium: Georgia Dome

2015 Sun Belt Conference football standings
	Conf.			Overall
Team	W		L	W		L
Arkansas State $	8	–	0	9	–	4
Appalachian State	7	–	1	11	–	2
Georgia Southern	6	–	2	9	–	4
Georgia State	5	–	3	6	–	7
South Alabama	3	–	5	5	–	7
Idaho	3	–	5	4	–	8
Louisiana–Lafayette	3	–	5	4	–	8
Troy	3	–	5	4	–	8
New Mexico State	3	–	5	3	–	9
Texas State	2	–	6	3	–	9
Louisiana–Monroe	1	–	7	2	–	11
$ – Conference champion

The 2015 Georgia State Panthers football team represented Georgia State University (GSU) in the 2015 NCAA Division I FBS football season. The Panthers were led by third-year head coach Trent Miles and played their home games at the Georgia Dome. The 2015 season was the Panthers' third in the Sun Belt Conference. They finished the season 6–7, 5–3 in Sun Belt play to finish in fourth place. They became bowl-eligible for the first time in program history and were invited to the inaugural Cure Bowl where they lost to San Jose State.

== Schedule ==
Date	Time	Opponent	Site	TV	Result	Attendance
September 4	3:30 p.m.	Charlotte*	Georgia Dome; Atlanta, GA	ESPNU	L 20–23	10,252
September 12	8:00 p.m.	at New Mexico State	Aggie Memorial Stadium; Las Cruces, NM	ESPN3	W 34–32	27,201
September 19	2:00 p.m.	at Oregon*	Autzen Stadium; Eugene, OR	P12N	L 28–61	56,859
October 3	3:30 p.m.	No. 18 (FCS) Liberty*^{†}	Georgia Dome; Atlanta, GA	ESPN3	L 33–41	17,765
October 10	3:30 p.m.	Appalachian State	Georgia Dome; Atlanta, GA	ESPN3	L 3–37	19,456
October 17	2:00 p.m.	at Ball State*	Scheumann Stadium; Muncie, IN	ESPN3	W 31–19	7,564
October 31	7:00 p.m.	at Arkansas State	Centennial Bank Stadium; Jonesboro, AR	ESPN3	L 34–48	18,217
November 7	2:00 p.m.	Louisiana–Lafayette	Georgia Dome; Atlanta, GA	ESPN3	L 21–23	21,112
November 14	4:00 p.m.	at Texas State	Bobcat Stadium; San Marcos, TX	ESPN3	W 41–19	13,328
November 21	2:00 p.m.	South Alabama	Georgia Dome; Atlanta, GA	ESPN3	W 24–10	10,033
November 27	2:00 p.m.	Troy	Georgia Dome; Atlanta, GA	ESPN3	W 31–21	10,113
December 5	2:00 p.m.	at Georgia Southern	Paulson Stadium; Statesboro, GA (rivalry)	ESPN3	W 34–7	23,401
December 19	7:00 p.m.	vs. San Jose State*	Citrus Bowl Stadium; Orlando, FL (Cure Bowl)	CBSSN	L 16–27	18,536
*Non-conference game; ^{†}Homecoming; Rankings from AP Poll released prior to game; All times are in Eastern time

Schedule source:

== Game summaries ==
=== Charlotte ===
	1	2	3	4	Total
49ers	13	7	3	0	23
Panthers	0	3	3	14	20

=== At New Mexico State ===
	1	2	3	4	Total
Panthers	10	14	3	7	34
Aggies	7	6	6	13	32

=== At Oregon ===
	1	2	3	4	Total
Panthers	7	0	21	0	28
No. 12 Ducks	13	20	14	14	61

=== Liberty ===
	1	2	3	4	Total
No. 18 (FCS) Flames	7	14	7	13	41
Panthers	14	0	10	9	33

=== Appalachian State ===
	1	2	3	4	Total
Mountaineers	17	3	10	7	37
Panthers	0	3	0	0	3

=== At Ball State ===
	1	2	3	4	Total
Panthers	7	17	0	7	31
Cardinals	3	7	3	6	19

=== At Arkansas State ===
	1	2	3	4	Total
Panthers	6	21	7	0	34
Red Wolves	13	7	7	21	48

=== Louisiana–Lafayette ===
	1	2	3	4	Total
Ragin' Cajuns	17	0	3	3	23
Panthers	7	7	7	0	21

=== At Texas State ===
	1	2	3	4	Total
Panthers	14	17	7	3	41
Bobcats	6	6	0	7	19

=== South Alabama ===
	1	2	3	4	Total
Jaguars	7	3	0	0	10
Panthers	0	7	3	14	24

=== Troy ===
	1	2	3	4	Total
Trojans	0	7	7	7	21
Panthers	7	10	14	0	31

=== At Georgia Southern ===
	1	2	3	4	Total
Panthers	0	7	13	14	34
Eagles	0	7	0	0	7

=== vs San Jose State (Cure Bowl) ===
	1	2	3	4	Total
Spartans	0	10	3	14	27
Panthers	0	7	0	9	16
