= 2015 Arkansas State Red Wolves football team =

American college football season

2015 Arkansas State Red Wolves football

Sun Belt champion

New Orleans Bowl, L 28–47 vs. Louisiana Tech
- Conference: Sun Belt Conference
- Record: 9–4 (8–0 Sun Belt)
- Head coach: Blake Anderson (2nd season)
- Co-offensive coordinators: Walt Bell (2nd season); Glen Elarbee (2nd season)
- Offensive scheme: Spread
- Defensive coordinator: Joe Cauthen (2nd season)
- Base defense: 4–2–5
- Home stadium: Centennial Bank Stadium

2015 Sun Belt Conference football standings
	Conf.			Overall
Team	W		L	W		L
Arkansas State $	8	–	0	9	–	4
Appalachian State	7	–	1	11	–	2
Georgia Southern	6	–	2	9	–	4
Georgia State	5	–	3	6	–	7
South Alabama	3	–	5	5	–	7
Idaho	3	–	5	4	–	8
Louisiana–Lafayette	3	–	5	4	–	8
Troy	3	–	5	4	–	8
New Mexico State	3	–	5	3	–	9
Texas State	2	–	6	3	–	9
Louisiana–Monroe	1	–	7	2	–	11
$ – Conference champion

The 2015 Arkansas State Red Wolves football team represented Arkansas State University in the 2015 NCAA Division I FBS football season. They were led by head coach Blake Anderson, who was the first Red Wolves head coach since Steve Roberts in 2002 to return for a second season at Arkansas State (the three coaches between Roberts and Anderson all left for other head coaching jobs after a single season). The Red Wolves, who play their home games at Centennial Bank Stadium in Jonesboro, Arkansas, are members of the Sun Belt Conference. The Red Wolves finished the regular season 9–3, 8–0 in Sun Belt play to win their fourth Sun Belt Championship in five seasons. In the New Orleans Bowl, the Red Wolves fell to Louisiana Tech 28–47.

== Schedule ==
Arkansas State announced their 2015 football schedule on February 27, 2015. The 2015 schedule consisted of six home and away games in the regular season. The Red Wolves hosted Sun Belt foes Georgia State, Idaho, Louisiana–Lafayette, and Texas State, and traveled to Appalachian State, Louisiana–Monroe, New Mexico State, and South Alabama.

Date	Time	Opponent	Site	TV	Result	Attendance
September 5	10:00 p.m.	at No. 8 USC*	Los Angeles Memorial Coliseum; Los Angeles, CA	P12N	L 6–55	79,809
September 12	6:00 p.m.	No. 21 Missouri*	Centennial Bank Stadium; Jonesboro, AR	ESPN3	L 20–27	29,143
September 19	6:00 p.m.	Missouri State*	Centennial Bank Stadium; Jonesboro, AR	ESPN3	W 70–7	26,634
September 26	6:00 p.m.	at Toledo*	Glass Bowl; Toledo, OH	ESPN3	L 7–37	21,385
October 3	6:00 p.m.	Idaho^{†}	Centennial Bank Stadium; Jonesboro, AR	ESPN3	W 49–35	23,411
October 13	7:00 p.m.	at South Alabama	Ladd–Peebles Stadium; Mobile, AL	ESPN2	W 49–31	18,538
October 20	7:00 p.m.	Louisiana–Lafayette	Centennial Bank Stadium; Jonesboro, AR	ESPN2	W 37–27	20,495
October 31	6:00 p.m.	Georgia State	Centennial Bank Stadium; Jonesboro, AR	ESPN3	W 48–34	18,217
November 5	6:30 p.m.	at Appalachian State	Kidd Brewer Stadium; Boone, NC	ESPNU	W 40–27	18,721
November 14	2:00 p.m.	at Louisiana–Monroe	Malone Stadium; Monroe, LA	ESPN3	W 59–21	9,063
November 28	2:00 p.m.	at New Mexico State	Aggie Memorial Stadium; Las Cruces, NM	ESPN3	W 52–28	25,147
December 5	2:00 p.m.	Texas State	Centennial Bank Stadium; Jonesboro, AR	ESPN3	W 55–17	20,143
December 19	8:00 p.m.	vs. Louisiana Tech*	Mercedes-Benz Superdome; New Orleans, LA (New Orleans Bowl)	ESPN	L 28–47	32,847
*Non-conference game; ^{†}Homecoming; Rankings from AP Poll released prior to the game; All times are in Central time

== Game summaries ==
=== At #8 USC ===
	1	2	3	4	Total
Red Wolves	0	0	6	0	6
#8 Trojans	14	14	14	13	55

=== Missouri ===
	1	2	3	4	Total
#21 Tigers	3	7	14	3	27
Red Wolves	0	17	0	3	20

=== Missouri State ===
	1	2	3	4	Total
Bears	0	0	7	0	7
Red Wolves	21	21	21	7	70

=== At Toledo ===
	1	2	3	4	Total
Red Wolves	0	7	0	0	7
Rockets	17	10	3	7	37

=== Idaho ===
	1	2	3	4	Total
Vandals	7	7	7	14	35
Red Wolves	7	21	14	7	49

=== At South Alabama ===
	1	2	3	4	Total
Red Wolves	14	0	6	29	49
Jaguars	7	14	3	7	31

=== Louisiana–Lafayette ===
	1	2	3	4	Total
Ragin' Cajuns	0	14	7	6	27
Red Wolves	13	21	3	0	37

=== Georgia State ===
	1	2	3	4	Total
Panthers	6	21	7	0	34
Red Wolves	13	7	7	21	48

=== At Appalachian State ===
	1	2	3	4	Total
Red Wolves	14	3	17	6	40
Mountaineers	14	7	0	6	27

=== At Louisiana–Monroe ===
	1	2	3	4	Total
Red Wolves	7	28	10	14	59
Warhawks	0	21	0	0	21

=== At New Mexico State ===
	1	2	3	4	Total
Red Wolves	21	14	10	7	52
Aggies	7	7	7	7	28

=== Texas State ===
	1	2	3	4	Total
Bobcats	0	7	3	7	17
Red Wolves	14	13	14	14	55

=== Louisiana Tech–New Orleans Bowl ===
	1	2	3	4	Total
Red Wolves	3	14	3	8	28
Bulldogs	10	7	17	13	47
