= 2015 Idaho Vandals football team =

American college football season

2015 Idaho Vandals football
- Conference: Sun Belt Conference
- Record: 4–8 (3–5 Sun Belt)
- Head coach: Paul Petrino (3rd season)
- Offensive coordinator: Kris Cinkovich (3rd season)
- Offensive scheme: Multiple
- Defensive coordinator: Mike Breske (1st season)
- Base defense: Multiple 3–4
- Home stadium: Kibbie Dome

2015 Sun Belt Conference football standings
| | Conf. | | | Overall |
| Team | W | | L | W | | L |
|---|---|---|---|---|---|---|
| Arkansas State $ | 8 | – | 0 | 9 | – | 4 |
| Appalachian State | 7 | – | 1 | 11 | – | 2 |
| Georgia Southern | 6 | – | 2 | 9 | – | 4 |
| Georgia State | 5 | – | 3 | 6 | – | 7 |
| South Alabama | 3 | – | 5 | 5 | – | 7 |
| Idaho | 3 | – | 5 | 4 | – | 8 |
| Louisiana–Lafayette | 3 | – | 5 | 4 | – | 8 |
| Troy | 3 | – | 5 | 4 | – | 8 |
| New Mexico State | 3 | – | 5 | 3 | – | 9 |
| Texas State | 2 | – | 6 | 3 | – | 9 |
| Louisiana–Monroe | 1 | – | 7 | 2 | – | 11 |
$ – Conference champion

The 2015 Idaho Vandals football team represented the University of Idaho in the 2015 NCAA Division I FBS football season. They were led by third year head coach Paul Petrino and played their home games at Kibbie Dome in Moscow, Idaho. The Vandals were football only members the Sun Belt Conference. They finished the season 4–8, 3–5 in Sun Belt play to finish in a five way tie for fifth place.

== Schedule ==
Idaho announced their 2015 football schedule on February 27, 2015. The 2015 schedule consisted of six home and away games in the regular season. The Vandals hosted Sun Belt foes Appalachian State, Georgia Southern, Louisiana–Monroe, and Texas State, and traveled to Arkansas State, New Mexico State, South Alabama, and Troy.

| Date | Time | Opponent | Site | TV | Result | Attendance |
|---|---|---|---|---|---|---|
| September 3 | 6:00 p.m. | Ohio* | Kibbie Dome; Moscow, ID | ESPN3 | L 28–45 | 11,587 |
| September 12 | 5:00 p.m. | at No. 8 USC* | Los Angeles Memorial Coliseum; Los Angeles, CA | P12N | L 9–59 | 72,422 |
| September 19 | 2:00 p.m. | Wofford* | Kibbie Dome; Moscow, ID | ESPN3 | W 41–38 | 11,633 |
| September 26 | 6:00 p.m. | Georgia Southern | Kibbie Dome; Moscow, ID | SWX ALT2 | L 20–44 | 14,441 |
| October 3 | 4:00 p.m. | at Arkansas State | Centennial Bank Stadium; Jonesboro, AR | ESPN3 | L 35–49 | 23,411 |
| October 17 | 12:30 p.m. | at Troy | Veterans Memorial Stadium; Troy, AL | ESPN3 | W 19–16 | 20,107 |
| October 24 | 2:00 p.m. | Louisiana–Monroe^{†} | Kibbie Dome; Moscow, ID | ESPN3 | W 27–13 | 14,414 |
| October 31 | 5:00 p.m. | at New Mexico State | Aggie Memorial Stadium; Las Cruces, NM | ESPN3 | L 48–55 ^{OT} | 7,546 |
| November 7 | 1:00 p.m. | at South Alabama | Ladd–Peebles Stadium; Mobile, AL | ESPN3 | L 45–52 | 17,651 |
| November 14 | 2:00 p.m. | Appalachian State | Kibbie Dome; Moscow, ID | ESPN3 | L 20–47 | 10,113 |
| November 21 | 2:00 p.m. | at Auburn* | Jordan–Hare Stadium; Auburn, AL | SECN Alt. | L 34–56 | 87,451 |
| November 28 | 2:00 p.m. | Texas State | Kibbie Dome; Moscow, ID | ESPN3 | W 38–31 | 8,893 |
*Non-conference game; ^{†}Homecoming; Rankings from AP Poll released prior to the game; All times are in Pacific time

== Game summaries ==
=== Ohio ===
| | 1 | 2 | 3 | 4 | Total |
|---|---|---|---|---|---|
| Bobcats | 21 | 7 | 3 | 14 | 45 |
| Vandals | 3 | 10 | 0 | 15 | 28 |

=== At USC ===
| | 1 | 2 | 3 | 4 | Total |
|---|---|---|---|---|---|
| Vandals | 0 | 3 | 6 | 0 | 9 |
| #8 Trojans | 21 | 17 | 14 | 7 | 59 |

=== Wofford ===
| | 1 | 2 | 3 | 4 | Total |
|---|---|---|---|---|---|
| Terriers | 3 | 14 | 14 | 7 | 38 |
| Vandals | 14 | 13 | 7 | 7 | 41 |

=== Georgia Southern ===
| | 1 | 2 | 3 | 4 | Total |
|---|---|---|---|---|---|
| Eagles | 10 | 6 | 14 | 14 | 44 |
| Vandals | 3 | 10 | 7 | 0 | 20 |

=== At Arkansas State ===
| | 1 | 2 | 3 | 4 | Total |
|---|---|---|---|---|---|
| Vandals | 7 | 7 | 7 | 14 | 35 |
| Red Wolves | 7 | 21 | 14 | 7 | 49 |

=== At Troy ===
| | 1 | 2 | 3 | 4 | Total |
|---|---|---|---|---|---|
| Vandals | 0 | 6 | 10 | 3 | 19 |
| Trojans | 0 | 0 | 3 | 13 | 16 |

=== Louisiana–Monroe ===
| | 1 | 2 | 3 | 4 | Total |
|---|---|---|---|---|---|
| Warhawks | 7 | 3 | 3 | 0 | 13 |
| Vandals | 3 | 10 | 7 | 7 | 27 |

=== At New Mexico State ===
| | 1 | 2 | 3 | 4 | OT | Total |
|---|---|---|---|---|---|---|
| Vandals | 10 | 13 | 10 | 15 | 0 | 48 |
| Aggies | 0 | 7 | 14 | 27 | 7 | 55 |

=== At South Alabama ===
| | 1 | 2 | 3 | 4 | Total |
|---|---|---|---|---|---|
| Vandals | 10 | 14 | 7 | 14 | 45 |
| Jaguars | 0 | 7 | 21 | 24 | 52 |

=== Appalachian State ===
| | 1 | 2 | 3 | 4 | Total |
|---|---|---|---|---|---|
| Mountaineers | 7 | 14 | 14 | 12 | 47 |
| Vandals | 7 | 6 | 0 | 7 | 20 |

=== At Auburn ===
| | 1 | 2 | 3 | 4 | Total |
|---|---|---|---|---|---|
| Vandals | 7 | 10 | 3 | 14 | 34 |
| Tigers | 14 | 21 | 14 | 7 | 56 |

=== Texas State ===
| | 1 | 2 | 3 | 4 | Total |
|---|---|---|---|---|---|
| Bobcats | 3 | 14 | 7 | 7 | 31 |
| Vandals | 7 | 17 | 0 | 14 | 38 |
