= 2015 New Mexico State Aggies football team =

American college football season

2015 New Mexico State Aggies football
- Conference: Sun Belt Conference
- Record: 3–9 (3–5 Sun Belt)
- Head coach: Doug Martin (3rd season)
- Offensive scheme: Air raid
- Defensive coordinator: Zane Vance (1st season)
- Base defense: 3–3–5
- Home stadium: Aggie Memorial Stadium

2015 Sun Belt Conference football standings
	Conf.			Overall
Team	W		L	W		L
Arkansas State $	8	–	0	9	–	4
Appalachian State	7	–	1	11	–	2
Georgia Southern	6	–	2	9	–	4
Georgia State	5	–	3	6	–	7
South Alabama	3	–	5	5	–	7
Idaho	3	–	5	4	–	8
Louisiana–Lafayette	3	–	5	4	–	8
Troy	3	–	5	4	–	8
New Mexico State	3	–	5	3	–	9
Texas State	2	–	6	3	–	9
Louisiana–Monroe	1	–	7	2	–	11
$ – Conference champion

The 2015 New Mexico State Aggies football team represented New Mexico State University as a member of the Sun Belt Conference during the 2015 NCAA Division I FBS football season. Led by third-year head coach Doug Martin, the Aggies compiled an overall record of 3–9 with a mark of 3–5 in conference play, placing in a five-way tie for fifth in the Sun Belt. New Mexico State played home games at Aggie Memorial Stadium in Las Cruces, New Mexico.

== Schedule ==
New Mexico State announced its 2015 football schedule on February 27, 2015. The 2015 schedule consisted of five home and seven away games in the regular season. The Aggies hosted Sun Belt foes Arkansas State, Georgia State, Idaho, and Troy, and traveled to Georgia Southern, Louisiana–Lafayette, Louisiana–Monroe, and Texas State.

Date	Time	Opponent	Site	TV	Result	Attendance
September 5	5:30 p.m.	at Florida*	Ben Hill Griffin Stadium; Gainesville, FL	SECN	L 13–61	90,227
September 12	6:00 p.m.	Georgia State	Aggie Memorial Stadium; Las Cruces, NM	AV, ESPN3	L 32–34	27,201
September 19	6:00 p.m.	UTEP*	Aggie Memorial Stadium; Las Cruces, NM (Battle of I-10)	AV, ESPN3	L 47–50 ^{OT}	17,210
October 3	6:00 p.m.	at New Mexico*	University Stadium; Albuquerque, NM (Rio Grande Rivalry)	RTRM, RTSW+	L 29–38	30,900
October 10	10:00 a.m.	at No. 14 Ole Miss*	Vaught–Hemingway Stadium; Oxford, MS	SECN	L 3–52	60,154
October 17	4:00 p.m.	at Georgia Southern	Paulson Stadium; Statesboro, GA	ESPN3	L 26–56	23,551
October 24	6:00 p.m.	Troy^{†}	Aggie Memorial Stadium; Las Cruces, NM	ESPN3	L 7–52	10,325
October 31	6:00 p.m.	Idaho	Aggie Memorial Stadium; Las Cruces, NM		W 55–48 ^{OT}	7,546
November 7	2:00 p.m.	at Texas State	Bobcat Stadium; San Marcos, TX	ESPN3	W 31–21	15,421
November 21	3:00 p.m.	at Louisiana–Lafayette	Cajun Field; Lafayette, LA	ESPN3	W 37–34	17,023
November 28	1:00 p.m.	Arkansas State	Aggie Memorial Stadium; Las Cruces, NM	ESPN3	L 28–52	25,147
December 5	1:00 p.m.	at Louisiana–Monroe	Malone Stadium; Monroe, LA	ESPN3	L 35–42	7,774
*Non-conference game; ^{†}Homecoming; Rankings from AP Poll released prior to the game; All times are in Mountain time

== Game summaries ==
=== At Florida ===
	1	2	3	4	Total
Aggies	0	13	0	0	13
Gators	7	27	13	14	61

=== Georgia State ===
	1	2	3	4	Total
Panthers	10	14	3	7	34
Aggies	7	6	6	13	32

=== UTEP ===
	1	2	3	4	OT	Total
Miners	9	0	7	28	6	50
Aggies	13	3	14	14	3	47

=== At New Mexico ===
	1	2	3	4	Total
Aggies	17	9	3	0	29
Lobos	14	0	15	9	38

=== At Ole Miss ===
	1	2	3	4	Total
Aggies	3	0	0	0	3
#14 Rebels	17	14	14	7	52

=== At Georgia Southern ===
	1	2	3	4	Total
Aggies	0	7	7	12	26
Eagles	14	21	14	7	56

=== Troy ===
	1	2	3	4	Total
Trojans	21	24	7	0	52
Aggies	0	7	0	0	7

=== Idaho ===
	1	2	3	4	OT	Total
Vandals	10	13	10	15	0	48
Aggies	0	7	14	27	7	55

=== At Texas State ===
	1	2	3	4	Total
Aggies	7	3	7	14	31
Bobcats	0	14	0	7	21

=== At Louisiana–Lafayette ===
	1	2	3	4	Total
Aggies	3	17	7	10	37
Ragin' Cajuns	7	10	3	14	34

=== Arkansas State ===
	1	2	3	4	Total
Red Wolves	21	14	10	7	52
Aggies	7	7	7	7	28

=== At Louisiana–Monroe ===
	1	2	3	4	Total
Aggies	14	7	14	0	35
Warhawks	7	7	21	7	42

== Roster ==
2015 New Mexico State Aggies football team roster
Players
Coaches
Offense

Pos.	#	Name	Class
WR	1	Teldrick Morgan	Jr
WR	2	Gregory Hogan	So
RB	3	Larry Rose III	So
WR	4	Cassius Corley	Fr
WR	5	Tyrain Taylor	Jr
WR	6	Joshua Bowen	Sr
WR	7	O. J. Clark	Fr
QB	8	Andrew Allen	So
WR	9	Rayvean Moore	Jr
WR	10	Royce Caldwell	Fr
WR	11	Jordan Bergstrom	Sr
QB	12	Nick Jeanty	Fr
WR	13	Justin Allen	Sr
QB	14	Jason Fitzpatrick	Jr
QB	17	Tyler Rogers	Jr
WR	18	Tymon Locklin	Fr
RB	20	Jermichael Selders	Sr
RB	22	Xavier Hall	Jr
RB	28	King Burke	Fr
RB	34	Brandyn Leonard	Fr
OL	50	Abram Holland	Jr
OL	51	Thomas McGwire	So
OL	54	Spence Ueli-Faatoalia	So
OL	55	Sebastian Anderson	Fr
OL	58	Dezmand Candielaria	So
OL	62	Isaiah Folasa-Lutui	Sr
OL	63	Nick Ledoux	So
OL	65	Tony Bello	Fr
OL	67	Anthony McMeans	Jr
OL	70	Andy Cunningham	Sr
OL	72	Peter Foreman	Jr
OL	74	Jamin Smith	So
OL	75	Antonio Ortega	Jr
OL	76	Raymond Fierro	Fr
OL	77	Houston Clemente	Sr
OL	78	Brian Trujillo	Fr
WR	80	Anthony Muse	Fr
TE	82	Ty Atencio	Jr
WR	83	Iniabasi Absaumoh	Sr
TE	85	Montrice Johns	Fr
WR	86	Troy Posey	So
WR	87	Izaiah Lottie	Fr
TE	88	Clayton Granch	Jr
TE	89	Jackson Solbeck	Fr
OL		Dustin Lamb	So
WR		Jason Onunkwo	So

Defense

Pos.	#	Name	Class
DB	1	Jacob Nwangwa	So
DB	2	Terrill Hanks	Fr
LB	3	Derek Ibekwe	So
DB	4	Winston Rose	Sr
DB	5	Christian Gibson	Fr
DB	6	King Davis III	Jr
LB	7	Javahn Fergurson	Fr
DE	8	Jassavia Reese	Fr
DL	9	Stody Bradley	So
DB	10	Kedeem Thomas-Davis	Sr
DB	11	Tre Wilcoxen	So
DB	13	DeMarcus Owens	Fr
DB	14	Dion Henrique	Fr
DE	15	Brett Kowalski	Fr
DB	16	Kawe Johnson	Jr
LB	17	Travis Parnell	Fr
DE	18	Derek Watson	Fr
DB	19	Austin Perkins	Fr
DB	21	Jaden Wright	So
DB	23	Jerrion Burton	So
DB	24	Sy Slater	Fr
DB	25	Samuel Oyenguga	Fr
DB	26	Iman Chatman	Fr
LB	28	Dominique Houston	Fr
DB	29	Lewis Hill	Sr
DB	30	Otis Ricks	Fr
LB	31	Dalton Herrington	So
LB	32	Dalton Rocha	So
DB	35	Malik Demby	Fr
LB	36	Shane Jackson	Fr
LB	38	Chris Acosta	So
LB	40	Robert Wagner	Jr
LB	42	Jonathan Hood	Fr
LB	43	Billy Nipp	Fr
LB	44	Will Clement	Fr
DE	48	Kalei Auelua	Jr
LB	49	Garrett Salpoek	Fr
DT	52	Cedric Wilcots II	Fr
LB	53	Rodney Butler	Jr
DE	57	Noah Brown	Jr
DL	59	Brandon Agomuo	So
DL	69	Alexander Trujillo	Sr
DL	73	Keanu Higgins	So
DL	90	Kourtland Busby	So
DL	91	Jacob Banegas	So
DL	93	Drew James	Jr
DE	95	Garron Nash	Fr
DL	97	Humberto Renteria	Fr
DE	98	Josh Gibbs	Sr
DL	99	Stephen Meredith	Sr
DB		Michael Lara	So

Special teams

Pos.	#	Name	Class
K	19	Alex Louthan	Jr
K	24	Parker Davidson	Fr
P	45	Greg Hutchins	Fr
LS	46	Kennon Nunez	Fr
LS	47	Andrew Kenney	Jr
P	96	Anthony Torres	Sr

Head coach

- Doug Martin (offensive coordinator/quarterbacks)

Coordinators/assistant coaches

- Zane Vance (defensive coordinator/linebacker)
- Brian Bell (safeties)
- Kerry Locklin (defensive tackles)
- Cory Martin (outside wide receivers)
- Kevin McKeethan (inside wide receivers/pass game coordinator/recruiting coordinator)
- Andy Richman (offensive line coach/run game coordinator)
- Oliver Soukup (defensive ends)
- Matt Christian (running backs)
- Kai Brown (graduate assistant)
- Izaiah Williams (graduate assistant)
- Garrett Anderson (graduate assistant)
- Cory White (player development coordinator)
- Robert Patel (video coordinator)
- Don Decker (director of sport performance)
- Tanner Maher (assistant director of sports performance
- Akeem Robinson (sports performance coaching assistant)
- Zach Witherspoon (sports performance coaching assistant)
- Martha Valdez (administrative assistant)

Legend

- (C) Team captain
- (S) Suspended
- (I) Ineligible
- Injured
- Redshirt

Roster
Last update: December 21, 2015
