= 2015 South Alabama Jaguars football team =

American college football season

2015 South Alabama Jaguars football
- Conference: Sun Belt Conference
- Record: 5–7 (3–5 Sun Belt)
- Head coach: Joey Jones (7th season)
- Offensive coordinator: Bryant Vincent (1st season)
- Offensive scheme: Spread
- Defensive coordinator: Travis Pearson (2nd season)
- Base defense: 3–4
- Home stadium: Ladd–Peebles Stadium

2015 Sun Belt Conference football standings
	Conf.			Overall
Team	W		L	W		L
Arkansas State $	8	–	0	9	–	4
Appalachian State	7	–	1	11	–	2
Georgia Southern	6	–	2	9	–	4
Georgia State	5	–	3	6	–	7
South Alabama	3	–	5	5	–	7
Idaho	3	–	5	4	–	8
Louisiana–Lafayette	3	–	5	4	–	8
Troy	3	–	5	4	–	8
New Mexico State	3	–	5	3	–	9
Texas State	2	–	6	3	–	9
Louisiana–Monroe	1	–	7	2	–	11
$ – Conference champion

The 2015 South Alabama Jaguars football team represented the University of South Alabama in the 2015 NCAA Division I FBS football season. They were led by seventh-year head coach Joey Jones and played their home games at Ladd–Peebles Stadium in Mobile, Alabama. The Jaguars, members of the Sun Belt Conference finished the season 5–7, 3–5 in Sun Belt play finishing in a five way tie for fifth place.

== Schedule ==
South Alabama announced their 2015 football schedule on February 27, 2015. The schedule consisted of six home and six away games.

Date	Time	Opponent	Site	TV	Result	Attendance
September 5	5:00 p.m.	Gardner–Webb*	Ladd–Peebles Stadium; Mobile, AL	ESPN3	W 33–23	12,289
September 12	7:00 p.m.	at Nebraska*	Memorial Stadium; Lincoln, NE	BTN	L 9–48	89,822
September 19	7:00 p.m.	at San Diego State*	Qualcomm Stadium; San Diego, CA		W 34–27 ^{OT}	18,194
September 26	7:00 p.m.	NC State*	Ladd–Peebles Stadium; Mobile, AL	ESPNews	L 13–63	21,314
October 3	6:00 p.m.	at Troy	Veterans Memorial Stadium; Troy, AL (rivalry)	ESPN3	W 24–18	22,873
October 13	8:00 p.m.	Arkansas State	Ladd–Peebles Stadium; Mobile, AL	ESPN2	L 31–49	18,538
October 24	6:00 p.m.	at Texas State	Bobcat Stadium; San Marcos, TX	ESPN3	L 18–36	14,523
November 7	2:00 p.m.	Idaho^{†}	Ladd–Peebles Stadium; Mobile, AL	ESPN3	W 52–45	17,651
November 12	6:30 p.m.	Louisiana–Lafayette	Ladd–Peebles Stadium; Mobile, AL	ESPNU	W 32–25	14,096
November 21	1:00 p.m.	at Georgia State	Georgia Dome; Atlanta, GA	ESPN3	L 10–24	10,033
November 28	1:00 p.m.	at Georgia Southern	Paulson Stadium; Statesboro, GA	ESPN3	L 17–55	15,125
December 5	7:30 p.m.	Appalachian State	Ladd–Peebles Stadium; Mobile, AL	ESPN3	L 27–34	12,346
*Non-conference game; ^{†}Homecoming; All times are in Central time

== Game summaries ==
=== Gardner–Webb ===
	1	2	3	4	Total
Runnin' Bulldogs	0	9	7	7	23
Jaguars	13	0	10	10	33

=== At Nebraska ===
	1	2	3	4	Total
Jaguars	0	0	3	6	9
Cornhuskers	14	10	7	17	48

=== At San Diego State ===
	1	2	3	4	OT	Total
Jaguars	3	7	7	10	7	34
Aztecs	0	17	3	7	0	27

=== NC State ===
	1	2	3	4	Total
Wolfpack	28	14	7	14	63
Jaguars	7	3	3	0	13

=== At Troy ===
	1	2	3	4	Total
Jaguars	14	7	3	0	24
Trojans	8	7	0	3	18

=== Arkansas State ===
	1	2	3	4	Total
Red Wolves	14	0	6	29	49
Jaguars	7	14	3	7	31

=== At Texas State ===
	1	2	3	4	Total
Jaguars	3	0	7	8	18
Bobcats	0	19	7	10	36

=== Idaho ===
	1	2	3	4	Total
Vandals	10	14	7	14	45
Jaguars	0	7	21	24	52

=== Louisiana–Lafayette ===
	1	2	3	4	Total
Ragin' Cajuns	6	0	7	12	25
Jaguars	7	10	0	15	32

=== At Georgia State ===
	1	2	3	4	Total
Jaguars	7	3	0	0	10
Panthers	0	7	3	14	24

=== At Georgia Southern ===
	1	2	3	4	Total
Jaguars	7	7	3	0	17
Eagles	7	21	17	10	55

=== Appalachian State ===
	1	2	3	4	Total
Mountaineers	14	10	0	10	34
Jaguars	7	0	10	10	27
