= DJ Thomas-Jones =

American football player (born 2002)

Profile
- Position: Fullback

Personal information
- Born: July 6, 2002 (age 24); Mobile, Alabama, U.S.
- Listed height: 6 ft 2 in (1.88 m)
- Listed weight: 256 lb (116 kg)

Career information
- High school: Saraland (Saraland, Alabama)
- College: Ole Miss (2020–2021); South Alabama (2022–2024)
- NFL draft: 2025: undrafted

Career history
- Pittsburgh Steelers (2025)*
- * Offseason or practice squad member only

DaMarcus Juan "DJ" Thomas-Jones (born July 6, 2002) is an American professional football fullback. He played college football for the Ole Miss Rebels and South Alabama Jaguars.

== Early life ==
Thomas grew up in Mobile, Alabama and attended Saraland High School in Saraland, Alabama, where he lettered in football and basketball. He was a four-star rated recruit and committed to play college football for the Ole Miss Rebels.

== College career ==
=== Ole Miss ===
During Thomas's true freshman season in 2020, he played for only six games before suffering a serious injury during a practice that left him unresponsive for several minutes and would be airlifted. He would be released from the hospital later that night. He finished the season with 29 total snaps with 16 on special teams and 13 on the offensive side.

During the 2021 season, he played in five games, finishing the season with a reception for six yards.

On December 1, 2021, Thomas announced that he would enter the transfer portal.

=== South Alabama ===
On December 12, 2021, Thomas announced that he would transfer to South Alabama.

During the summer of 2022, after going by his given name of DaMarcus, he would start using his nickname, DJ, and added the hyphenation of Jones to his last name in honor of his stepfather, Stevie Jones.

During the 2022 season, he played in 12 games and started three of them, finishing the season with 24 receptions for 227 yards and three touchdowns. He hauled in a season-high record of four receptions twice against Arkansas State and Western Kentucky in the 2022 New Orleans Bowl.

During the 2023 season, he played in all 13 games and started seven of them, finishing the season with 27 receptions for 235 yards and five touchdowns.

During the 2024 season, he played in and started all 13 games, finishing the season with 22 receptions for 191 yards and three touchdowns.

== Professional career ==
Pre-draft measurables
Height	Weight	Arm length	Hand span	40-yard dash	10-yard split	20-yard split	Three-cone drill	Vertical jump	Broad jump	Bench press
6 ft 2 in (1.88 m)	250 lb (113 kg)	33 1/8 in (0.84 m)	10 in (0.25 m)	4.65 s	1.71 s	2.73 s	7.02 s	35 in (0.89 m)	10 ft 0 in (3.05 m)	18 reps
All values from Pro Day

Thomas-Jones signed with the Pittsburgh Steelers as an undrafted free agent on April 26, 2025. He was waived by the Steelers on August 11.
