= Jaden Voisin =

American football player (born 2001)

No. 2
- Position: Safety

Personal information
- Born: June 22, 2001 (age 25); Oklahoma City, Oklahoma, U.S.
- Listed height: 5 ft 10 in (1.78 m)
- Listed weight: 212 lb (96 kg)

Career information
- High school: Crestview (Crestview, Florida)
- College: South Alabama (2019–2024)

Awards and highlights
- 2× First-team All-Sun Belt (2023, 2024)
- Stats at ESPN

Jaden Andrew Voisin (born June 22, 2001) is an American former college football safety for the South Alabama Jaguars.

== Early life ==
Voisin was born in Oklahoma City, Oklahoma, and grew up there until the first grade, when he and his family moved to Germany. They would return to the United States in 2013, where they would settle in Crestview, Florida. Voisin attended Crestview High School, where he lettered in football, basketball, and track. During his senior year, he posted 39 catches for 743 yards and nine touchdowns, as well as returning four kickoffs for an additional 142 yards to reach the semifinals of the state 6A playoffs. He also helped his basketball team to the state 7A championship as a senior. He was a two-star rated recruit and committed to play college football at the University of South Alabama over offers from Troy, Appalachian State, Georgia Southern and Buffalo.

== College career ==
During the 2019 season, he played in all 12 games, playing primarily on special teams. He finished the season with five unassisted tackles and a career-best two stops against Texas State.

During the 2020 season, he played in the last four games after suffering an injury during practice prior to the start of the season. He finished the season with a solo tackle against Louisiana.

Voisin did not see action during the 2021 season.

During the 2022 season, he played in all 13 games and started 12 of them at safety, finishing the season with 80 total tackles (44 solo and 36 assisted), six tackles for loss for 25 yards, one forced fumble, one recovered fumble and a pair of intercepted passes, along with three quarterback hurries and five pass breakups.

During the 2023 season, he played in and started all 13 games, finishing the season with 71 total tackles (31 solo and 40 assisted), 2.5 tackles for loss for seven yards, four intercepted passes, 11 pass breakups and a forced fumble.

On December 24, 2023, just one day after playing in the 2023 68 Ventures Bowl, Voisin announced that he would enter the transfer portal. However, on January 8, 2024, he would withdraw from the transfer portal.

During the 2024 season, he played in all 13 games and started 12 of them, finishing the season with 83 total tackles (42 solo and 41 assisted), 3.5 tackles for loss for 14 yards, five intercepted passes and 10 pass breakups.

On December 30, 2024, Voisin announced that he would declare for the 2025 NFL draft.

== Personal life ==
Voisin's identical twin, Devin, played with him at South Alabama, along with their older brother Keon.
