= Desmond Trotter =

American football player (born 2000)

Personal information
- Born: August 6, 2000 (age 26)
- Listed height: 6 ft 3 in (1.91 m)
- Listed weight: 220 lb (100 kg)

Career information
- High school: Shades Valley (Irondale, Alabama)
- College: South Alabama (2018–2023)
- Stats at ESPN

Desmond Ryan Trotter (born August 6, 2000) is an American former college football player who was a quarterback for the South Alabama Jaguars.

== Early life ==
Trotter grew up in Irondale, Alabama, and attended Shades Valley High School. He was rated a three-star recruit and committed to play college football at South Alabama over offers from Jacksonville State, Samford, Gardner–Webb, and Tuskegee.

== College career ==
Trotter redshirted his true freshman season at South Alabama. He appeared in 8 games during his redshirt freshman season in 2019 and started the final 4 games making his debut against UAB. During the season, he completed 56-of-97 attempts to complete 820 yards and leading the team with 8 touchdown passes and with 2 interception passes. During the 2020 season, Trotter started and played in 10 games where he completed 160-of-248 attempts to complete 1,917 passing yards and 11 touchdowns. Trotter was named as one of eight quarterbacks as the Manning Award Star of the Week after his performance in the Week 1 game against Southern Miss where he made career high 340 passing yards and total offense yards and led the Jaguars to a 32–21 win making it their first season-opening victory since 2016. During the 2021 season, Trotter played in 5 games and started in 2 finishing the season with 42-of-72 passing attempts for 380 passing yards. During the annual Battle for the Belt game against Troy, he replaced Jake Bentley as the lead quarterback after suffering a knee injury. During the game, he completed 20-for-32 attempts for 138 passing yards, two touchdowns and an interception. During the 2022 season, he played 5 games and finished the season having 15-for-20 completed attempts with 144 passing yards. On December 24, 2022, Trotter announced that he plans to enter the transfer portal but he later would remain at South Alabama for the 2023 season.

=== College statistics ===
Season	Team	GP	Passing						Rushing			
Season	Team	GP	Cmp	Att	Yds	TD	Int	Rate	Att	Yds	Avg	TD
2019	South Alabama	8	56	97	820	8	2	151.8	61	197	3.2	0
2020	South Alabama	10	160	248	1,917	11	4	140.9	84	3	0.0	2
2021	South Alabama	5	61	104	596	5	3	116.9	32	54	1.7	1
2022	South Alabama	5	15	20	144	0	0	135.5	6	27	4.5	0
2023	South Alabama	5	29	41	351	5	2	173.1	14	55	3.9	1
Career		33	321	510	3,828	29	11	140.4	197	336	1.7	4

== Professional career ==
Pre-draft measurables
Height	Weight	Arm length	Hand span	40-yard dash	10-yard split	20-yard split	20-yard shuttle	Three-cone drill	Vertical jump	Broad jump
6 ft 3 in (1.91 m)	223 lb (101 kg)	31 1/4 in (0.79 m)	9 1/2 in (0.24 m)	4.84 s	1.71 s	2.81 s	4.50 s	7.20 s	29.5 in (0.75 m)	9 ft 2 in (2.79 m)
All values from Pro Day

== Personal life ==
Trotter is the grandson of former National Football League Pro Football Hall of Fame tight end, Ozzie Newsome.
