= 2012 South Alabama Jaguars football team =

American college football season

2012 South Alabama Jaguars football
- Conference: Sun Belt Conference
- Record: 2–11 (1–7 Sun Belt)
- Head coach: Joey Jones (4th season)
- Offensive coordinator: Robert Matthews (1st season)
- Offensive scheme: Multiple
- Defensive coordinator: Bill Clark (4th season)
- Base defense: Multiple 3–4
- Home stadium: Ladd–Peebles Stadium

2012 Sun Belt Conference football standings
	Conf.			Overall
Team	W		L	W		L
Arkansas State $	7	–	1	10	–	3
Louisiana–Monroe	6	–	2	8	–	5
Middle Tennessee	6	–	2	8	–	4
Louisiana–Lafayette *	4	–	2	5	–	4
Western Kentucky	4	–	4	7	–	6
Troy	3	–	5	5	–	7
North Texas	3	–	5	4	–	8
Florida Atlantic	2	–	6	3	–	9
FIU	2	–	6	3	–	9
South Alabama **	1	–	7	2	–	11
$ – Conference champion; * – Louisiana–Lafayette vacated 4 wins due to NCAA violations. ** – South Alabama was ineligible for the conference title or a bowl game as part of their transition to the FBS.

The 2012 South Alabama Jaguars football team represented the University of South Alabama in the 2012 NCAA Division I FBS football season. They were led by fourth-year head coach Joey Jones and played their home games at Ladd–Peebles Stadium. They were a member of the Sun Belt Conference. As part of their two-year transition to the FBS from the FCS, the Jaguars were not eligible for the Sun Belt championship and were not eligible to play in a bowl game. They finished the season 2–11, 1–7 in Sun Belt play to finish in last place.

== Schedule ==
Date	Time	Opponent	Site	TV	Result	Attendance
September 1	1:00 p.m.	UTSA*	Ladd–Peebles Stadium; Mobile, AL	ESPN3	L 31–33	17,144
September 8	4:00 p.m.	Nicholls State*	Ladd–Peebles Stadium; Mobile, AL	ESPN3	W 9–3	15,237
September 15	5:00 p.m.	at NC State*	Carter–Finley Stadium; Raleigh, NC	ESPN3	L 7–31	54,132
September 22	6:00 p.m.	at No. 23 Mississippi State*	Davis Wade Stadium; Starkville, MS	Bulldog Sports Properties	L 10–30	55,186
September 29	2:30 p.m.	Troy	Ladd–Peebles Stadium; Mobile, AL (rivalry)	Sun Belt Network/CSS	L 10–31	23,789
October 13	6:00 p.m.	at Arkansas State	Liberty Bank Stadium; Jonesboro, AR		L 29–36	22,143
October 20	2:30 p.m.	Florida Atlantic^{†}	Ladd–Peebles Stadium; Mobile, AL		W 37–34 ^{2OT}	17,566
October 27	6:00 p.m.	at Louisiana–Monroe	Malone Stadium; Monroe, LA		L 24–38	14,556
November 3	2:30 p.m.	FIU	Ladd–Peebles Stadium; Mobile, AL		L 20–28	11,936
November 10	4:00 p.m.	at North Texas	Apogee Stadium; Denton, TX		L 14–24	15,963
November 17	2:30 p.m.	Middle Tennessee	Ladd–Peebles Stadium; Mobile, AL	ESPN3	L 12–20	15,087
November 24	4:00 p.m.	at Louisiana–Lafayette	Cajun Field; Lafayette, LA	RCN/ESPN3	L 30–52	20,333
December 1	10:00 p.m.	at Hawaiʻi*	Aloha Stadium; Honolulu, HI	Oceanic PPV/ROOT/TWCSN	L 7–23	27,865
*Non-conference game; ^{†}Homecoming; Rankings from AP Poll released prior to the game; All times are in Central time

== Coach death ==
On April 11, inside linebacker coach Kurt Crain was found dead in Spanish Fort, Alabama from an apparent self-inflicted gunshot wound. Crain had been on the Jaguars staff since 2008. He was 47 years old.
