= Kawaan Baker =

American football player (born 1998)

Profile
- Position: Wide receiver

Personal information
- Born: August 24, 1998 (age 28); East Point, Georgia, U.S.
- Listed height: 6 ft 1 in (1.85 m)
- Listed weight: 210 lb (95 kg)

Career information
- High school: Hapeville Charter Academy (Union City, Georgia)
- College: South Alabama (2016–2020)
- NFL draft: 2021: 7th round, 255th overall pick

Career history
- New Orleans Saints (2021–2022); Green Bay Packers (2022)*; Philadelphia Eagles (2022)*; New Orleans Saints (2022–2023)*; New England Patriots (2024)*; San Antonio Brahmas (2025)*; Las Vegas Raiders (2025)*; Green Bay Packers (2025)*
- * Offseason or practice squad member only

Awards and highlights
- Second-team All-Sun Belt (2020)

Career NFL statistics
- Games played: 2
- Stats at Pro Football Reference

Kawaan LaAndrae Baker (born August 24, 1998) is an American professional football wide receiver. He played college football at South Alabama and was selected by the New Orleans Saints in the seventh round of the 2021 NFL draft.

== Early life ==
Baker was born on August 24, 1998, in East Point, Georgia, to Larry and Crystal Upshaw.

== Professional career ==
Pre-draft measurables
Height	Weight	Arm length	Hand span	40-yard dash	10-yard split	20-yard split	20-yard shuttle	Three-cone drill	Vertical jump	Broad jump	Bench press
6 ft 0 1/2 in (1.84 m)	210 lb (95 kg)	32 3/8 in (0.82 m)	10 3/4 in (0.27 m)	4.43 s	1.49 s	2.51 s	4.41 s	7.42 s	39.5 in (1.00 m)	10 ft 9 in (3.28 m)	21 reps
All values from Pro Day

=== New Orleans Saints (first stint) ===
Baker was selected by the New Orleans Saints in the seventh round, 255th overall, of the 2021 NFL draft. He signed his four-year rookie contract with New Orleans on June 8, 2021. He was waived on August 31, 2021, and re-signed to the practice squad. He signed a reserve/future contract with the Saints on January 11, 2022.

On August 2, 2022, Baker was suspended for the first six games of the regular season. He was waived on October 17.

=== Green Bay Packers (first stint) ===
On October 19, 2022, Baker was signed to the Green Bay Packers' practice squad. He was released on November 8.

=== Philadelphia Eagles ===
On November 30, 2022, Baker was signed to the Philadelphia Eagles practice squad. He was released on December 6.

=== New Orleans Saints (second stint) ===
On December 27, 2022, Baker was signed to the Saints practice squad. He signed a reserve/future contract on January 26, 2023. Baker was waived on August 29.

=== New England Patriots ===
On February 6, 2024, Baker signed a reserve/future contract with the New England Patriots. He was waived on August 26.

=== San Antonio Brahmas ===
On March 8, 2025, Baker signed with the San Antonio Brahmas of the United Football League (UFL).

=== Las Vegas Raiders ===
On August 3, 2025, Baker signed with the Las Vegas Raiders. He was waived on August 11.

=== Green Bay Packers (second stint) ===
On August 12, 2025, Baker was claimed off waivers by the Green Bay Packers. He was waived on August 25.
