= Carter Bradley =

American football player (born 2000)

Profile
- Position: Quarterback

Personal information
- Born: March 9, 2000 (age 26); Fargo, North Dakota, U.S.
- Listed height: 6 ft 3 in (1.91 m)
- Listed weight: 213 lb (97 kg)

Career information
- High school: Providence School (Jacksonville, Florida)
- College: Toledo (2018–2021); South Alabama (2022–2023)
- NFL draft: 2024: undrafted

Career history
- Las Vegas Raiders (2024); San Francisco 49ers (2025)*; Jacksonville Jaguars (2025–2026)*
- * Offseason or practice squad member only

Awards and highlights
- Second-team All-Sun Belt (2022)
- Stats at Pro Football Reference

Carter Roy Bradley (born March 9, 2000) is an American professional football quarterback. He played college football for the Toledo Rockets and South Alabama Jaguars before playing professional football for the Las Vegas Raiders and San Francisco 49ers. He is the son of Gus Bradley.

== Early life ==
Bradley was born in Fargo, North Dakota, but attended high school in Jacksonville, Florida at Providence School. He was rated a three-star recruit and committed to play college football at Toledo over offers from Colorado State, East Carolina, FIU, Florida Atlantic, Georgia State, Indiana, Louisville, Ole Miss, Pitt, Rutgers, South Florida, Temple, West Virginia, Western Michigan, Wisconsin, and Wyoming.

== College career ==
=== Toledo ===
Bradley appeared in three games during his true freshman year and completed all three of his pass attempts for 52 yards. He then redshirted after suffering a torn labrum during a spring practice. During his redshirt freshman season, he started in the regular season finale game and completed 15 of his 23 passes for 121 yards. He was then named Academic All-MAC. In the 2020 season, he had the third-highest passing efficiency in the MAC Conference with 164.1 and seventh in passing yards per game with 212.3 passing yards. He was named Academic All-MAC for the second year in a row and was also a nominee for Academic All-America. On November 29, 2021, it was announced that Bradley would be entering the transfer portal.

=== South Alabama ===
On December 14, 2021, Bradley announced that he would be transferring to South Alabama. In 2022, Bradley set school records by completing 3,326 total passing yards, 276 total completions, and 28 touchdowns. He was ranked 22nd in passing touchdowns and 25th in passing yards nationally. He was named to the Manning Star of the Week list after his game in Week 2 against Central Michigan.

On January 2, 2024, Bradley announced that he would be declaring for the 2024 NFL draft.

=== College statistics ===
Season	Team	Games			Passing								Rushing			
Season	Team	GP	GS	Record	Cmp	Att	Pct	Yds	Avg	TD	Int	Rtg	Att	Yds	Avg	TD
2018	Toledo	3	0	0–0	4	8	50.0	54	6.8	0	0	106.7	4	-10	-2.5	0
2019	Toledo	7	2	0–2	46	100	46.0	502	5.0	1	2	87.5	25	-7	-0.3	1
2020	Toledo	4	2	2–0	55	89	61.8	849	9.5	9	5	164.1	18	41	2.3	0
2021	Toledo	8	6	3–3	77	130	59.2	972	7.5	4	1	130.7	23	-33	-1.4	0
2022	South Alabama	13	13	10–3	275	425	64.7	3,335	7.8	28	12	146.7	68	65	1.0	3
2023	South Alabama	11	11	6–5	221	326	67.8	2,660	8.4	19	7	151.3	43	-48	-1.1	1
Career		46	34	21−13	678	1,078	62.9	8,372	7.8	61	27	141.8	181	8	0.4	5

== Professional career ==
Pre-draft measurables
Height	Weight	Arm length	Hand span	Wingspan	40-yard dash	10-yard split	20-yard split	Vertical jump	Broad jump
6 ft 3 1/8 in (1.91 m)	213 lb (97 kg)	32 1/8 in (0.82 m)	9 3/8 in (0.24 m)	6 ft 5 in (1.96 m)	4.85 s	1.60 s	2.74 s	33.5 in (0.85 m)	9 ft 6 in (2.90 m)
All values from Pro Day

=== Las Vegas Raiders ===
Bradley signed with the Las Vegas Raiders as an undrafted free agent on April 27, 2024. He was waived on August 27, and re-signed to the practice squad. Bradley was promoted to the active roster on December 10.

On July 14, 2025, Bradley was waived by the Raiders.

=== San Francisco 49ers ===
On July 31, 2025, Bradley signed with the San Francisco 49ers. He was waived/injured on August 25.

=== Jacksonville Jaguars ===
On September 30, 2025, Bradley was signed to the Jacksonville Jaguars' practice squad. He signed a reserve/future contract with Jacksonville on January 12, 2026.

On August 30, 2026, Bradley was waived/injured by the Jaguars.

== Personal life ==
Bradley is the son of Tennessee Titans defensive coordinator Gus Bradley.
