= 2009 South Alabama Jaguars football team =

American college football season

2009 South Alabama Jaguars football
- Conference: Independent
- Record: 7–0
- Head coach: Joey Jones (1st season)
- Offensive coordinator: Greg Gregory (1st season)
- Offensive scheme: Multiple
- Defensive coordinator: Bill Clark (1st season)
- Base defense: Multiple 3–4
- Home stadium: Ladd–Peebles Stadium

The 2009 South Alabama Jaguars football team represented the University of South Alabama in the 2009 college football season. They were led by first-year head coach Joey Jones and played their home games at Ladd–Peebles Stadium, located in Mobile, Alabama. The Jaguars, playing as an unclassified independent in their inaugural season, played an abbreviated season of seven games. None of the games played were against any other NCAA Division I teams, having most of their games held against preparatory schools. The Jaguars completed their exhibitory season with an undefeated record of seven wins and zero losses (7–0).

== Schedule ==
Date	Time	Opponent	Site	Result	Attendance
September 5	4:00 p.m.	Hargrave Military Academy	Ladd–Peebles Stadium; Mobile, AL	W 30–13	26,783
September 26	4:00 p.m.	Army Prep	Ladd–Peebles Stadium; Mobile, AL	W 56–0	17,063
October 10	11:30 a.m.	Georgia Military College	Ladd–Peebles Stadium; Mobile, AL	W 31–3	15,183
October 17	4:00 p.m.	Louisburg College	Ladd–Peebles Stadium; Mobile, AL	W 41–7	15,754
October 31	4:00 p.m.	Fork Union Military Academy	Ladd–Peebles Stadium; Mobile, AL	W 64–6	12,188
November 7	4:00 p.m.	Milford Academy^{†}	Ladd–Peebles Stadium; Mobile, AL	W 64–12	15,565
November 12	6:00 p.m.	Huntingdon	Ladd–Peebles Stadium; Mobile, AL	W 35–0	23,683
^{†}Homecoming; All times are in Central time
