= Jamaal Pritchett =

American football player (born 2003)

No. 81 – New York Jets
- Position: Wide receiver
- Roster status: Practice squad

Personal information
- Born: June 10, 2003 (age 23); Jackson, Alabama, U.S.
- Listed height: 5 ft 8 in (1.73 m)
- Listed weight: 175 lb (79 kg)

Career information
- High school: Jackson (AL)
- College: Tuskegee (2021); South Alabama (2022–2024)
- NFL draft: 2025: undrafted

Career history
- New York Jets (2025–present)

Awards and highlights
- First-team All-Sun Belt (2024)

Career NFL statistics as of Week 3, 2026
- Return yards: 27
- Stats at Pro Football Reference

Jamaal Pritchett (born June 10, 2003) is an American professional football wide receiver for the New York Jets of the National Football League (NFL). He played college football for the Tuskegee Golden Tigers and South Alabama Jaguars.

== Early life ==
Pritchett grew up in Jackson, Alabama, and attended Jackson High School, where he lettered in football and basketball. He signed to play for the Tuskegee Golden Tigers.

== College career ==
=== Tuskegee ===
As a freshman in 2021, Pritchett recorded 29 receptions for 528 yards and three touchdowns in 10 games.

=== South Alabama ===
Pritchett transferred to South Alabama as a walk-on in 2022. During the 2022 season, he made two catches for 24 yards in eight games.

Pritchett was placed on scholarship for the 2023 season. During the 2023 season, he played in all 13 games and started 10 of them, finishing the season with 57 receptions for 883 yards and eight touchdowns.

During the 2024 season, he played in 12 games and started 11 of them, finishing the season with 91 receptions for 1,126 yards and nine touchdowns.

On December 20, 2024, Pritchett declared for the 2025 NFL draft.

On January 15, 2025, Pritchett accepted an invite to play at the 2025 Senior Bowl.

== Professional career ==
Pre-draft measurables
Height	Weight	Arm length	Hand span	Wingspan	40-yard dash	10-yard split	20-yard split	20-yard shuttle	Three-cone drill	Vertical jump	Broad jump
5 ft 8 1/2 in (1.74 m)	175 lb (79 kg)	29 1/2 in (0.75 m)	9 1/4 in (0.23 m)	5 ft 10 1/8 in (1.78 m)	4.42 s	1.50 s	2.58 s	4.46 s	7.20 s	30.5 in (0.77 m)	9 ft 9 in (2.97 m)
All values from Pro Day

Pritchett signed with the New York Jets as an undrafted free agent on May 9, 2025. He was waived on August 26 as part of final roster cuts and re-signed to the practice squad the next day. Pritchett signed a reserve/future contract with New York on January 5, 2026.

On August 30, 2026, Pritchett was waived by the Jets as a part of final roster cuts; he was re-signed to the team's practice squad the following day. He was promoted to the active roster on September 26. On October 10, Pritchett was waived and re-signed to the practive squad three days later.

== Personal life ==
Pritchett is cousin with Seattle Seahawks cornerback Nehemiah Pritchett.
