= Jalen Wayne =

American football wide receiver (born 1999)

Profile
- Position: Wide receiver

Personal information
- Born: May 13, 1999 (age 27); Marion, Louisiana, U.S.
- Listed height: 6 ft 2 in (1.88 m)
- Listed weight: 210 lb (95 kg)

Career information
- High school: Spanish Fort (Spanish Fort, Alabama)
- College: South Alabama (2017–2022)
- NFL draft: 2023: undrafted

Career history
- Buffalo Bills (2023)*; Cleveland Browns (2023)*; Montreal Alouettes (2024)*; Green Bay Packers (2024)*; Montreal Alouettes (2025)*
- * Offseason or practice squad member only

Awards and highlights
- Second-team All-Sun Belt (2022)
- Stats at Pro Football Reference

Jalen Jakory Wayne (born May 13, 1999) is an American professional football wide receiver who is a free agent. He played college football at South Alabama.

== Early life ==
Wayne grew up in Spanish Fort, Alabama and attended Faith Academy, where he focused on basketball and was a member of the high school varsity team while he was in eighth grade. He transferred to Spanish Fort High School before the start of his senior year. During his senior season, he brought in 28 catches for 469 yards and 3 touchdowns while also rushing for 279 yards. After graduation, he attended the University of South Alabama.

== College career ==
Wayne played American football with the University of South Alabama. He delayed engagement in athletics his sophomore season after playing in four games. In his junior season, he hauled 33 receptions for 418 yards and 1 touchdown. As a redshirt senior, he caught 53 passes for 630 yards and 2 touchdowns. Wayne used the extra year of eligibility granted to college athletes due to the COVID-19 pandemic and returned to South Alabama for a sixth season. He caught 58 receptions for 815 yards and nine touchdowns in his final season. For his performance he was named Second Team All Sun-Belt. Wayne finished his college career with 152 receptions for 1,980 yards and 14 touchdowns.

== Professional career ==
Pre-draft measurables
Height	Weight	Arm length	Hand span	40-yard dash	10-yard split	20-yard split	20-yard shuttle	Three-cone drill	Vertical jump	Broad jump
6 ft 1 3/4 in (1.87 m)	210 lb (95 kg)	32 1/8 in (0.82 m)	9 3/8 in (0.24 m)	4.51 s	1.54 s	2.61 s	4.51 s	7.43 s	34.5 in (0.88 m)	10 ft 4 in (3.15 m)

=== Buffalo Bills ===
After not being selected in the 2023 NFL draft, Wayne signed with the Buffalo Bills as an undrafted free agent. He was released on July 28, 2023.

=== Cleveland Browns ===
On August 4, 2023, Wayne signed with the Cleveland Browns. On August 27, 2023, Wayne was released by the Browns.

=== Montreal Alouettes (first stint) ===
Wayne signed with the Montreal Alouettes of the Canadian Football League (CFL) on January 22, 2024.

=== Green Bay Packers ===
Wayne signed with the Green Bay Packers on July 19, 2024. He was released on August 27, 2024, and re-signed to the practice squad. He was released on September 10, 2024.

=== Montreal Alouettes (second stint) ===
Wayne was signed by the Alouettes again on January 20, 2025. He was released on July 13, 2025.

== Personal life ==
Wayne is the cousin of wide receiver Reggie Wayne.
