= Diego Guajardo =

Mexican-American football player (born 2000)

No. 36
- Position: Placekicker

Personal information
- Born: February 3, 2000 (age 26); Monterrey, Mexico
- Listed height: 6 ft 0 in (1.83 m)
- Listed weight: 185 lb (84 kg)

Career information
- High school: Daphne (Daphne, Alabama, U.S.)
- College: South Alabama (2019–2023)

Awards and highlights
- Second-team All-Sun Belt (2022); Third-team All-Sun Belt (2020)
- Stats at ESPN

Diego Guajardo (born February 3, 2000) is a Mexican former American football placekicker for the South Alabama Jaguars.

== Early life ==
Guajardo was born in Monterrey, Mexico and grew up in Spanish Fort, Alabama and attended Daphne High School. In his high school football career, Guajardo punted 48 times for an average of 45.6 yards per kick. He was ranked as one of the top 30 placekickers in the country and the top 40 kickers nationally by Kohl's Kicking. He was rated a two-star recruit and committed to play college football at South Alabama over offers from Louisville, Arkansas State and Louisiana–Monroe.

== College career ==
During Guajardo's true freshman season in 2019, he appeared in all 12 games as the team's kickoff specialist. He finished the season with averaging 59 yards on 67 kickoffs with 13 touchbacks.

During the 2020 season, he played in all 11 games and finished the season with 13-of-17 field goal attempts and 24-of-25 extra-point tries. He was ranked third in the Sun Belt and in the top 45 nationally in field goals per game and was also named a third-team all-Sun Belt Conference selection.

During the 2021 season, he played in all 12 games and finished the season with 12-of-17 field goals and 33-of-35 extra point attempts. He also recorded 23 touchbacks on 59 kickoffs.

During the 2022 season, he played in all 13 games and finished the season with 17-for-18 in field goals and five for five from 40 to 49 yards and 44-of-45 for extra point attempts. He was also ranked nationally in four different categories including sixth in field goal percentage and was named a second-team all-Sun Belt Conference selection.

During the 2023 season, Guajardo overtook the South Alabama football program's all-time scoring record with 244 total points on 45 field goals and 109 extra points. Prior to the start of the season, he was named to the Lou Groza Award Watch List.

== Professional career ==
Pre-draft measurables
Height	Weight
6 ft 0 in (1.83 m)	185 lb (84 kg)
All values from Pro Day
