= Devin Voisin =

American football player (born 2001)

No. 1 – South Alabama Jaguars
- Position: Wide receiver
- Class: Redshirt Senior

Personal information
- Born: June 22, 2001 (age 25); Oklahoma City, Oklahoma, U.S.
- Listed height: 5 ft 10 in (1.78 m)
- Listed weight: 187 lb (85 kg)

Career information
- High school: Crestview (Crestview, Florida)
- College: South Alabama (2019–2025)

Awards and highlights
- Second-team All-Sun Belt (2025)
- Stats at ESPN

Devin Gabriel Voisin (born June 22, 2001) is an American college football wide receiver for the South Alabama Jaguars.

== Early life ==
Voisin was born in Oklahoma City, Oklahoma, and grew up there until the first grade when him and his family moved to Germany. They returned to the United States in 2013, settling in Crestview, Florida. Voisin attended Crestview High School in Crestview and committed to play college football for the South Alabama Jaguars over offers from other schools such as Troy, Appalachian State, and Georgia Southern.

== College career ==
In his first three seasons from 2019 through 2021, Voisin caught two passes for six yards in 27 games played. In 2022, he posted 64 receptions for 867 yards and five touchdowns. In the 2023 season, Voisin only appeared in two games before suffering a season-ending knee injury, finishing with five catches for 77 yards and a touchdown. In 2024, he totaled 34 receptions for 407 yards. In week 2 of the 2025 season, Voisin recorded eight receptions for 152 yards and two touchdowns versus Tulane. He finished the 2025 season with 67 catches for 775 yards and four touchdowns in 11 starts, while also returning 11 punts for 125 yards. In his seven-year career, Voisin appeared in a school-record 67 games, totaling 172 receptions for 2,133 yards and ten touchdowns. After the 2025 season, he accepted an invite to the 2026 Senior Bowl.

== Personal life ==
Voisin is the twin brother of former South Alabama all-conference defensive back Jaden Voisin.
