= 2010 South Alabama Jaguars football team =

American college football season

2010 South Alabama Jaguars football
- Conference: Independent
- Record: 10–0
- Head coach: Joey Jones (2nd season)
- Offensive coordinator: Greg Gregory (2nd season)
- Offensive scheme: Multiple
- Defensive coordinator: Bill Clark (2nd season)
- Base defense: Multiple 3–4
- Home stadium: Ladd–Peebles Stadium

The 2010 South Alabama Jaguars football team represented the University of South Alabama in the 2010 college football season. They were led by second-year head coach Joey Jones and played their home games at Ladd–Peebles Stadium, located in Mobile, Alabama.

Continuing the Jaguars' immersion into NCAA Division I football, the Jaguars increased their schedule to ten games from seven in their inaugural season, dropped all of their prep school opponents, played three of their ten contests on the road, and played against four FCS opponents. The Jaguars completed their second season with an undefeated record of ten wins and zero losses (10–0). This was the Jaguars' last season as an unclassified independent before becoming an FCS independent in 2011.

== Schedule ==
Date	Time	Opponent	Site	Result	Attendance
September 4	4:00 p.m.	Pikeville	Ladd–Peebles Stadium; Mobile, AL	W 56–0	22,376
September 18	4:00 p.m.	Nicholls State	Ladd–Peebles Stadium; Mobile, AL	W 39–21	23,174
September 25	3:00 p.m.	Edward Waters*	Rip Hewes Stadium; Dothan, AL	W 64–0	4,563
October 2	4:00 p.m.	Kentucky Wesleyan	Ladd–Peebles Stadium; Mobile, AL	W 52–3	18,419
October 9	4:00 p.m.	Missouri S&T	Ladd–Peebles Stadium; Mobile, AL	W 45–6	14,119
October 16	6:00 p.m.	at Lamar	Provost Umphrey Stadium; Beaumont, TX	W 26–0	16,150
October 23	4:00 p.m.	at UC Davis	Aggie Stadium; Davis, CA	W 24–21	6,835
October 30	4:00 p.m.	Georgia State	Ladd–Peebles Stadium; Mobile, AL	W 39–34	23,446
November 6	4:00 p.m.	Henderson State^{†}	Ladd–Peebles Stadium; Mobile, AL	W 37–31	14,920
November 11	6:00 p.m.	Arkansas–Monticello	Ladd–Peebles Stadium; Mobile, AL	W 31–14	14,904
*Non-conference game; ^{†}Homecoming; All times are in Central time
