= South Alabama–Troy football rivalry =

American college football rivalry

Battle for the Belt
- South Alabama Jaguars Troy Trojans
- Sport: Football
- First meeting: September 29, 2012; Troy 31, South Alabama 10
- Latest meeting: November 14, 2026; South Alabama 27, Troy 14
- Next meeting: 2027
- Trophy: The Belt

Statistics
- Total meetings: 15
- All-time series: Troy leads, 10–5
- Trophy series: Troy leads, 8–4
- Largest victory: Troy, 29–0 (2020)
- Longest win streak: Troy, 6 (2018–2023)
- Current win streak: South Alabama, 1 (2026–present)

Locations of South Alabama and Troy

The Battle for the Belt is an American college football rivalry game between two public universities in the U.S. state of Alabama, University of South Alabama Jaguars and the Troy University Trojans. Troy leads the all-time series at 10–5.

== History ==
The South Alabama Jaguars were co-founding members of the Sun Belt Conference in 1976. Troy joined the conference in 2004 as a football-only member. In 2005, the Trojans transitioned the rest of their sports to the Sun Belt, and South Alabama and Troy began facing each other in sports other than football, since at that time, South Alabama did not have a football team.

On December 6, 2007, South Alabama's Board of Trustees approved the addition of football to the intercollegiate athletics program. The team began play in 2009 with a planned full transition to the FBS (Division I-A) by 2013.

In 2012, South Alabama's football team officially joined the school's other sports in the Sun Belt Conference and started to face the conference members in a full conference schedule.

In 2015, the Student Government Associations of each school came together to officially dub the rivalry the "Battle for the Belt," with a wrestling-style belt going to the winner of the rivalry annually. According to then South Alabama Student Government Association President Ravi Rajendra, "The introduction of the trophy to the rivalry will offer a new way for Jag Nation to connect with our football program. The concept behind the Belt stemmed from our student body and was accompanied by insight from our football team; the football team really liked the concept of a wrestling belt, and the Belt also plays off of the Sun Belt Conference of which both Troy and USA are members."

In 2017, the Sun Belt Conference announced to split its football member schools to two divisions starting for the 2018 season. Despite the close proximity of South Alabama and Troy, the conference separated the two, Troy in the East division and South Alabama in the West. In two separate divisions this could alter the annual series between schools. A year before the 2018 football season, the conference athletic directors at that time voted in favor of having South Alabama and Troy to play every season despite not being in the same division. This rivalry became the only protected cross-divisional series in the conference until in 2022, Troy was moved to the West Division to accommodate the addition of new members Southern Miss, James Madison, Old Dominion, and Marshall. With this move, South Alabama and Troy is now an intra-divisional matchup.

== Game results ==
South Alabama victories	Troy victories	Tie games

No.	Date	Location	Winner	Score
1	September 29, 2012	Mobile	Troy	31–10
2	October 5, 2013	Troy	Troy	34–33
3	October 24, 2014	Mobile	South Alabama	27–13
4	October 3, 2015	Troy	South Alabama	24–18
5	October 20, 2016	Mobile	Troy	28–21
6	October 11, 2017	Troy	South Alabama	19–8
7	October 23, 2018	Mobile	Troy	38–17
8	October 16, 2019	Troy	Troy	37–13
9	December 5, 2020	Mobile	Troy	29–0
10	November 6, 2021	Troy	Troy	31–24
11	October 20, 2022	Mobile	Troy	10–6
12	November 2, 2023	Troy	Troy	28–10
13	October 15, 2024	Mobile	South Alabama	25–9
14	October 4, 2025	Troy	Troy	31–24^{OT}
15	November 14, 2026	Mobile	South Alabama	27–14
Series: Troy leads 10–5

=== Game 1 (2012) ===
The South Alabama – Troy football rivalry officially began on a rain-soaked Saturday, September 29, 2012, at historic Ladd-Peebles Stadium in Mobile, where Troy defeated the Jaguars 31–10.

=== Game 2 (2013) ===
The second meeting between the teams was a thriller. In a game where South Alabama dominated the stats, the Jags suffered a one-point loss in a battle that featured two lead changes in the final minutes, including a game-winning Troy touchdown with 7 seconds left on the clock.

=== Game 3 (2014) ===
The Jaguars claimed their first victory in the series with a convincing 27–13 win, and the rivalry was truly born.

=== Game 4 (2015) ===
The 4th game of the series took place in Troy. Troy had a bye week the week before giving them 2 weeks to build the hype. Troy had a huge pep rally with a bonfire on campus (in which Jaguar merchandise was burned) the Thursday night before the game. A car spray painted red, white, and blue (South Alabama's colors) was on campus and hammers were used to smash the car. This game was a "Blackout" game. All fans were encouraged to wear black. The first 10,000 fans into the stadium were given a free black T-shirt. A DJ was provided for the game for the students. South Alabama rolled to a 24–18 victory.

=== Game 5 (2016) ===
The 5th game of the series took place in Mobile. South Alabama jumped out to an early lead and had a 21–13 lead going into the 4th quarter. This lead would not hold however as Troy would score twice in the 4th quarter and win 28–21. The game winning touchdown was scored with 1:20 left in the game and Troy successfully ended their two-game losing streak to South Alabama.

=== Game 6 (2017) ===
In the 6th game of the series the location was once again Troy. South Alabama came in and faced a Troy team that had recently upset LSU in Baton Rouge so Troy was the favorite to win the game. However, South Alabama pulled off an upset of their own by forcing four turnovers and defeating Troy 19–8. Troy missed two field goals and barely avoided the first shutout in the series by scoring a touchdown and two point conversion with 6:16 left in the game.

=== Game 7 (2018) ===
The 7th game of the series saw Troy come to Mobile trying to avenge their shocking loss to South Alabama a year prior. Troy led 31–17 at the end of the first half due to big plays by their offense. Neither team was able to score any points in the second half until a South Alabama interception set up Troy's offense at the South Alabama 11 yard line. Troy would have a total of six plays of 30 yards or more and force 4 turnovers as they went on to win 38–17.

=== Game 8 (2019) ===
The 8th game in the series took place once again in Troy with Troy trying to be the first team to retain the belt for more than one year. South Alabama stayed with Troy through the first half and were only down 16–10 at half. Troy was able to pull away in the second half despite committing three turnovers throughout the game by holding South Alabama without a touchdown and forcing a pick six. Troy would go on to win 37–13, become the first team to hold the belt for two consecutive years, and the first team to win the belt at home.

=== Game 9 (2020) ===
In the first game of the series to take place in South Alabama's new Hancock Whitney stadium, Troy shut out the Jaguars 29–0. Troy jumped out to a 27–0 halftime lead and held South Alabama without a trip to the red zone. A blocked South Alabama punt for a safety were the only points scored in the second half as Troy cruised to an easy victory and retained the Belt for the third straight year. This was also the last game coached by then South Alabama head coach Steve Campbell, as he was fired the next day.

=== Game 10 (2021) ===
The series returned to Troy in a game that saw both teams play the majority of the game with their backup quarterbacks. South Alabama got an early 7–0 lead but lost their starting quarterback on the opening possession to injury. Troy would then score 31 unanswered points before South Alabama scored just before halftime to make it 31–14 at the break. Troy lost their starting quarterback in the 2nd quarter and struggled to generate offense in the second half. South Alabama would attempt to make a comeback by holding Troy scoreless for the remainder of the game but would come up just short and lose 31–24 to give Troy their 4th consecutive victory in the series.

=== Game 11 (2022) ===
The game with the highest stakes in the rivalry so far also was the most defensive. With the lead in the West Division on the line both defenses came to play in Mobile. Troy scored the lone touchdown of the game in the 2nd quarter and South Alabama added a field goal as the quarter ended to make the score 7–3 at halftime. Both sides would score a field goal in the 2nd half as South Alabama held Troy to just 1 third down conversion in the entire game but Troy limited the Jaguars to just one red zone trip. With this strong defense Troy got the 10–6 win, their fifth consecutive in the series.

=== Game 12 (2023) ===
The teams met in Troy on two very different trajectories. Troy were 6–2 and in firm control of the Sun Belt West. Meanwhile, South Alabama entered the game 4–4 and looking to make a late-season push for bowl eligibility. South Alabama would get on the board first, scoring a short-yardage rushing touchdown early in the 1st quarter. However, Troy would respond with two passing touchdowns in the 2nd quarter to take a 14–7 lead into the half. After a scoreless 3rd quarter, South Alabama hit a 29-yard field goal early in the 4th quarter to cut the deficit to four. Troy, however, would take over offensively once more, scoring two more touchdowns late in the quarter to secure a 28–10 win and their sixth consecutive win of the series.

=== Game 13 (2024) ===
South Alabama came into this matchup looking to finally end their 6-game losing streak to Troy. The 1st quarter of the game was all defense, with South holding a 3–0 lead at the end of it. However, the Jaguars would take over in the 2nd quarter by scoring a passing touchdown, their first touchdown against Troy in Hancock Whitney Stadium, a safety, and a rushing touchdown. Troy would add a late field goal to make the score 19–3 at halftime. South Alabama only scored two field goals in the 2nd half but forced 3 turnovers throughout the game and held Troy without a touchdown until late in the 4th quarter. The Jaguars would win 25–9, their first win in the series since 2017, their 2nd ever win over Troy in Mobile, and their 1st win over Troy in Hancock Whitney Stadium.

=== Game 14 (2025) ===
In the first overtime game of the series, Troy was looking to avenge their loss to South Alabama in the previous meeting. Troy scored first to make it 7–0, but the Jaguars quickly answered to tie it back up. The Trojans scored again in the 2nd quarter and had a 14–7 lead at halftime. After a fumble from Troy, South Alabama got a field goal and shortly after a touchdown to take a 17–14 lead in the 3rd. But Troy would respond again, scoring a touchdown of their own and adding a field goal in the 4th for a 24–17 advantage. With the game on the line, South Alabama drove for the tying touchdown and sent the game to overtime. In overtime, Troy got a touchdown and then stopped South Alabama on 4th down to claim a 31–24 victory.

=== Game 15 (2026) ===
The 15th game of the series saw the teams meet in Mobile trying to secure an important win toward bowl eligibility. South Alabama's running game dominated early, with touchdown runs of 46 and 44 yards, to build a 14–0 1st quarter lead. Troy struggled on offense but was able to score on a 45 yard rushing touchdown in the 2nd quarter. South Alabama later added a field goal and lead 17–7 at the half. In the 3rd quarter South Alabama had another long rushing touchdown of 28 yards to expand the lead to 27–7. Troy attempted a comeback in the 4th quarter with a touchdown and multiple defensive stops but the Jaguar defense held strong to secure the 27–14 victory. South Alabama finished the game with 246 rushing yards and won its second straight series game in Mobile.

== See also ==
- List of NCAA college football rivalry games
