= 2015 Louisiana–Lafayette Ragin' Cajuns football team =

American college football season

2015 Louisiana–Lafayette Ragin' Cajuns football
- Conference: Sun Belt Conference
- Record: 4–8 (3–5 Sun Belt)
- Head coach: Mark Hudspeth (5th season)
- Offensive coordinator: Jay Johnson (5th season)
- Offensive scheme: Spread
- Co-defensive coordinators: Charlie Harbison (1st season); Melvin Smith (1st season)
- Base defense: 4–3
- Home stadium: Cajun Field

2015 Sun Belt Conference football standings
	Conf.			Overall
Team	W		L	W		L
Arkansas State $	8	–	0	9	–	4
Appalachian State	7	–	1	11	–	2
Georgia Southern	6	–	2	9	–	4
Georgia State	5	–	3	6	–	7
South Alabama	3	–	5	5	–	7
Idaho	3	–	5	4	–	8
Louisiana–Lafayette	3	–	5	4	–	8
Troy	3	–	5	4	–	8
New Mexico State	3	–	5	3	–	9
Texas State	2	–	6	3	–	9
Louisiana–Monroe	1	–	7	2	–	11
$ – Conference champion

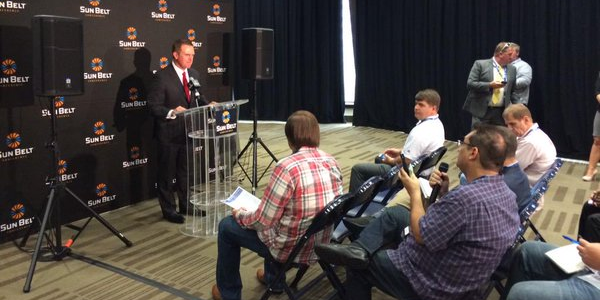
Coach Hudspeth addresses the media at the 2015 Sun Belt Media Day before the season.

The 2015 Louisiana–Lafayette Ragin' Cajuns football team represented the University of Louisiana at Lafayette in the 2015 NCAA Division I FBS football season. They were led by fifth-year head coach Mark Hudspeth and played their home games at Cajun Field in Lafayette, Louisiana. The Ragin' Cajuns were members of the Sun Belt Conference. They finished the season 4–8, 3–5 in Sun Belt play to finish in a five way tie for fifth place.

== Preseason ==
=== Award watchlists ===
The following players were named to preseason award watchlist

Walter Camp Award

- Elijah McGuire

Lombardi Award

- Mykhael Quave
- Dominique Tovell

Doak Walker Award

- Elijah McGuire

Paul Hornung Award

- Elijah McGuire

=== Sun Belt Media Day ===
==== Sun Belt Conference Players of the Year ====
Offensive Player of the Year – Elijah McGuire, RB (Louisiana-Lafayette)

==== Predicted standings ====
Sun Belt Conference predicted standings
Predicted finish	Team	Votes (1st Place)
1	Georgia Southern	110 (6)
2	Louisiana-Lafayette	108 (3)
3	Arkansas State	96 (1)
4	Appalachian State	82
5	Texas State	78
6	South Alabama	68 (1)
7	UL Monroe	59
8	Troy	39
9	Georgia State	32
10	New Mexico State	30
11	Idaho	24

==== Preseason All–Conference Team ====
Offense

QB Fredi Knighten (Arkansas State)
RB Matt Breida (Georgia Southern)
RB Elijah McGuire (Louisiana-Lafayette)
WR J. D. McKissic (Arkansas State)
WR Donovan Harden (Georgia State)
WR Rashon Ceaser (UL Monroe)
TE Joel Ruiz (Georgia State)
OL Jesse Chapman (Appalachian State)
OL Darien Foreman (Georgia Southern)
OL Chris May (South Alabama)
OL Joseph Scelfo (South Alabama)
OL Adrian Bellard (Texas State)

Defense

DL Chris Stone (Arkansas State)
DL Ronald Blair (Appalachian State)
DL Gerrand Johnson (UL Monroe)
DL Javon Rolland-Jones (Arkansas State)
LB John Law (Appalachian State)
LB Xavier Woodson (Arkansas State)
LB Joseph Peterson (Georgia State)
DB Doug Middleton (Appalachian State)
DB Mitch Lane (UL Monroe)
DB David Mims II (Texas State)
DB Montres Kitchens (Troy)

Specialists

PK Aleem Sunanon (South Alabama)
P Austin Rehkow (Idaho)
RS Blaise Taylor (Arkansas State)

== Roster ==
2015 Louisiana-Lafayette Ragin' Cajuns football team roster
Players
Coaches
Offense

Pos.	#	Name	Class
QB	2	Gunner Hudspeth	Fr
WR	2	Al Riles	Jr
RB	3	Montrel Carter	Sr
WR	4	Jamal Robinson	Sr
QB	6	Jalen Nixon	Jr
QB	8	Dion Ray	Fr
QB	9	Brooks Haack	Jr
QB	11	Chris Weaver	Fr
WR	13	Gabe Fuselier	So
RB	15	Elijah McGuire	Jr
WR	17	Ja'Marcus Bradley	Fr
QB	18	Patrick Morton	So
WR	18	Devin Scott	Jr
WR	19	Michael Jacquet	Fr
WR	20	Gary Haynes	Fr
WR	21	Keenan Barnes	Fr
WR	22	Mark Mornay	So
RB	23	Darius Hoggins	So
RB	25	Torrey Pierce	Sr
RB	26	Effrem Reed	Sr
RB	27	Jordan Wright	Fr
WR	28	Chris Collins	Fr
WR	30	Leon Duncan	Fr
WR	31	Jerry Martin	Fr
TE	33	Carlos Robinson	Fr
TE	39	Alex Allen	Fr
RB	41	Jentrell Oliver	Jr
OL	50	Robert Hunt	Fr
OL	60	D’Aquin Withrow	So
OL	61	Cole Prudhomme	Fr
OL	62	Grant Mieling	Fr
OL	63	Raynard Ford	Jr
OL	65	Jessie Freeman	Fr
OL	66	Rico Robinson	Fr
OL	67	Ken Marks	Fr
OL	68	Octravian Anderson	Sr
OL	69	Caden Cunningham	Fr
OL	70	Mykhael Quave	Sr
OL	72	Grant Horst	So
OL	73	Ethan Rosenbalm	Jr
OL	75	Kevin Dotson	Fr
OL	76	Adrian Goodacre	Fr
OL	77	Donovan Williams	Sr
OL	78	Allen Cummins	So
OL	79	Eddie Gordon	Jr
WR	80	Shelby Christy	So
TE	81	Nick Byrne	Jr
TE	82	Greg Siener	Sr
TE	84	Jacoby Beasly	So
WR	85	Jerrell Richardson	Jr
TE	87	Chris Turner	Fr
TE	88	Evan Tatford	Sr
TE		Matt Barnes	So
WR		Jarrod Jackson	Fr
WR		Jared Johnson	Jr
WR		Lance Pace	Jr

Defense

Pos.	#	Name	Class
LB	4	Tre’Maine Lightfoot	Jr
DB	6	Savion Brown	Jr
LB	7	Otha Peters	Jr
DB	8	Simeon Thomas	So
DB	9	Lorenzo Cryer	Fr
DB	10	Christian Goodlett	Jr
DB	11	Jevante Watson	Sr
DB	13	Edward Thompson	So
DB	16	Travis Crawford	So
DB	17	Ethan Rose	Fr
DB	18	Blair Brooks	Fr
DB	19	Troy McCollum	So
DB	20	Dominick Jones	Jr
LB	21	Alonzo Brown	Fr
DB	22	Reggie Miles	So
DB	23	Tracy Walker	So
DB	24	Cole Bourque	So
DB	25	Deuce Wallace	Fr
DB	27	T.J. Worthy	Sr
LB	28	Joe Dillon	Fr
LB	29	Tyren Alexander	Sr
LB	30	T.J. Posey	So
DB	31	Corey Turner	Fr
DB	33	Zachary DeGrange	Sr
LB	34	Ross Duhon	So
LB	35	Chaiziere Malbrue	Fr
DL	36	David McCormick	Fr
DB	37	Errol Brown	Fr
LB	38	Terik Miler	Fr
LB	39	Darzil Washington	Sr
LB	41	Zach Jones	Jr
LB	43	Kaleb Fredericks	Fr
LB	44	Kevin Fouquier	Jr
LB	46	Asa Miller	Fr
DB	48	Vince Thomas	Fr
LB	51	Trey Granier	Jr
LB	52	Dominique Tovell	Sr
DL	54	Rodney Baker	Fr
DL	55	Karmichael Dunbar	Jr
LB	56	Terrence Jones	Fr
DL	57	Chris Prater	Sr
LB	59	Shay Laporte	Fr
DT	90	Jacoby Briscoe	Jr
DL	91	Mario Osborne	Fr
DL	92	Taboris Lee	So
DL	93	Darryl Johnson	Fr
DL	94	Andarious Jones	Fr
DL	95	Rodrick Stephens	So
DL	96	Blain Winston	So
DL	97	Sherard Johnson	So
DL	98	Ladarrius Kidd	Fr
DL	99	Remaine Douglas	Jr
DB		Kamar Greenhouse	Fr

Special teams

Pos.	#	Name	Class
LS	35	Sterling Miller	Fr
K	36	Stevie Artigue	Fr
LS	40	Jake Guidry	Sr
K	47	Dylan Scheurich	Fr
LS	49	Stephen Morella	Jr
LS	58	Kel Straubmueller	So
K	83	Carlos Alvarez	Sr
K/P	86	Aaron Bird	Fr

Head coach

- Mark Hudspeth (Delta State)

Coordinators/assistant coaches

- Michael Desormeaux (Louisiana)
  Assistant head, wide receivers
- Levron Harbin (North Alabama)
  Assistant head, defensive line
- Charlie Harbison (Gardner–Webb)
  Assistant Head, Co-defensive Coordinator, Outside Linebackers
- Jay Johnson (Northern Iowa)
  Offensive coordinator, quarterbacks
- Marquase Lovings (Howard)
  Assistant head, running backs
- Mike Lucas (Liberty)
  Assistant head, inside linebackers
- Jorge Munoz (Bethany (KS))
  Pass game coordinator, wide receivers
- Mitch Rodrigue (Nicholls State)
  Run game coordinator, offensive line
- Melvin Smith
  Assistant head, defensive coordinator, defensive backs
- Reed Stringer (Delta State)
  Assistant head, recruiting coordinator, tight ends
- Rusty Whitt (Abilene Christian)
  Strength & conditioning coach
- Troy Wingerter (Louisiana)
  Director of football operations
- Ryan Trichel (Southeastern Louisiana)
  Director of player personnel

Legend

- (C) Team captain
- (S) Suspended
- (I) Ineligible
- Injured
- Redshirt

Roster
Last update: January 1, 2018

== Schedule ==
Louisiana–Lafayette announced their 2015 football schedule on February 27, 2015. The 2015 schedule consisted of six home and away games in the regular season. The Ragin' Cajuns hosted Sun Belt foes Louisiana–Monroe, New Mexico State, Texas State, and Troy, and traveled to Appalachian State, Arkansas State, Georgia State, and South Alabama.

Date	Time	Opponent	Site	TV	Result	Attendance
September 5	6:00 pm	at Kentucky*	Commonwealth Stadium; Lexington, KY	ESPNU	L 33–40	62,933
September 12	6:00 pm	Northwestern State*	Cajun Field; Lafayette, LA	ESPN3	W 44–17	26,824
September 26	6:00 pm	Akron*	Cajun Field; Lafayette, LA	ESPN3	L 14–35	24,679
October 3	6:00 pm	at Louisiana Tech*	Joe Aillet Stadium; Ruston, LA	ASN	L 14–43	26,910
October 10	6:00 pm	Texas State	Cajun Field; Lafayette, LA	ESPN3	W 49–27	21,377
October 20	7:00 pm	at Arkansas State	Centennial Bank Stadium; Jonesboro, AR	ESPN2	L 27–37	20,495
October 31	4:00 pm	Louisiana–Monroe^{†}	Cajun Field; Lafayette, LA (Battle on the Bayou)	ESPN3	W 30–24	17,410
November 7	1:00 pm	at Georgia State	Georgia Dome; Atlanta, GA	ESPN3	W 23–21	10,070
November 12	6:30 pm	at South Alabama	Ladd–Peebles Stadium; Mobile, AL	ESPNU	L 25–32	14,096
November 21	4:00 pm	New Mexico State	Cajun Field; Lafayette, LA	ESPN3	L 34–37	17,023
November 28	1:00 pm	at Appalachian State	Kidd Brewer Stadium; Boone, NC	ESPN3	L 7–28	16,124
December 5	4:00 pm	Troy	Cajun Field; Lafayette, LA	ESPN3	L 17–41	22,264
*Non-conference game; ^{†}Homecoming; All times are in Central time

Schedule source:

== Game summaries ==
Louisiana-Lafayette at Kentucky – Game summary

Quarter	1	2	3	4	Total
Ragin' Cajuns	0	7	10	16	33
Wildcats	14	10	9	7	40

at Commonwealth Stadium, Lexington, KY

- Date: September 5
- Game time: 6:00 p.m. CST
- Game weather: 88 °F (31 °C); hot, mostly sunny
- Game attendance: 62,933
- Referee: Matt Austin
- TV: ESPNU

Game information

First quarter

- UK - Stanley Williams 75-yard TD run, Austin MacGinnis kick good, 14:44 (UK 7-0)
- UK - Garrett Johnson 35-yard TD pass from Patrick Towles, MacGinnis kick good, 6:17 (UK 14-0)

Second quarter

- UK - Jeff Badet 37-yard TD pass from Towles, MacGinnis kick good, 14:43 (UK 21-0)
- ULL - Brooks Haack 4-yard TD run, Stevie Artigue kick good, 8:33 (UK 21-7)
- UK - MacGinnis 44-yard field goal, 2:16 (UK 24-7)

Third quarter

- UK - MacGinnis 24-yard field goal, 9:54 (UK 27-7)
- ULL - Artigue 31-yard field goal, 6:04 (UK 27-10)
- UK - Blake Bone 5-yard TD pass from Towles, MacGinnis kick no good, 3:47 (UK 33-10)
- ULL - Torrey Pierce 56-yard TD run, Artigue kick good, 1:26 (UK 33-17)

Fourth quarter

- ULL - Pierce 26-yard TD run, Jalen Nixon two-point conversion pass good to Elijah McGuire, 11:39 (UK 33-25)
- ULL - Nixon 23-yard TD run, McGuire two-point conversion run good, 7:36 (TIE 33-33)
- UK - Mikel Horton 12-yard TD run, MacGinnis kick good, 0:57 (UK 40-33)

Top passers

- UK - Patrick Towles - 16/34, 257 yards, 3 TD, INT
- ULL - Brooks Haack - 22/37, 194 yards, 2 INT

Top rushers

- UK - Stanley Williams - 10 carries, 135 yards, TD
- ULL - Torrey Pierce - 10 carries, 110 yards, 2 TD

Top receivers

- UK - Garrett Johnson - 5 receptions, 85 yards, TD
- ULL - Gabe Fuselier - 7 receptions, 69 yards

=== Northwestern State ===
Northwestern State at Louisiana-Lafayette – Game summary

Quarter	1	2	3	4	Total
Demons	0	10	7	0	17
Ragin' Cajuns	14	13	7	10	44

at Cajun Field, Lafayette, LA

- Date: September 12
- Game time: 6:00 p.m. CST
- Game weather: 82 °F (28 °C); mostly sunny
- Game attendance: 26,824
- Referee: Jeff Hilyer
- TV: ESPN3

Game information

First quarter

- ULL - Elijah McGuire 7-yard TD run, Stevie Artigue kick good, 13:01 (ULL 7-0)
- ULL - McGuire 88-yard TD run, Artigue kick good, 9:07 (ULL 14-0)

Second quarter

- NSU - Chris Jones 41-yard TD run, Chris Moore kick good, 10:17 (ULL 14-7)
- ULL - McGuire 3-yard TD run, Artigue kick no good, 3:55 (ULL 20-7)
- ULL - McGuire 24-yard TD run, Artigue kick good, 1:16 (ULL 27-7)
- NSU - Moore 21-yard field goal, 0:07 (ULL 27-10)

Third quarter

- ULL - McGuire 1-yard TD run, Artigue kick good, 6:16 (ULL 34-10)
- NSU - Cody Jones 14-yard TD pass from J.D. Almond, Moore kick good, 2:30 (ULL 34-17)

Fourth quarter

- ULL - Pierce 1-yard TD run, Artigue kick good, 14:56 (ULL 41-17)
- ULL - Artigue 26-yard field goal, 7:33 (ULL 44-17)

Top passers

- ULL - Brooks Haack - 7/8, 187 yards
- NSU - J.D. Almond - 5/10, 66 yards, TD

Top rushers

- ULL - Elijah McGuire - 14 carries, 162 yards, 5 TD
- NSU - Daniel Taylor - 13 carries, 60 yards

Top receivers

- ULL - Devin Scott - 3 receptions, 90 yards
- NSU - Chris Jones - 2 receptions, 62 yards, TD

=== Akron ===
Akron at Louisiana-Lafayette – Game summary

Quarter	1	2	3	4	Total
Zips	7	7	14	7	35
Ragin' Cajuns	0	7	0	7	14

at Cajun Field, Lafayette, LA

- Date: September 26
- Game time: 6:00 p.m. CST
- Game weather: 85 °F (29 °C); cloudy
- Game attendance: 24,679
- Referee: Tony Cannella
- TV: ESPN3

Game information

First quarter

- AKR - Andrew Pratt 9-yard TD pass from Thomas Woodson, Robert Stein kick good, 7:10 (AKR 7-0)

Second quarter

- AKR - Woodson 14-yard TD run, Stein kick good, 14:54 (AKR 14-0)
- ULL - Elijah McGuire 17-yard TD run, Stevie Artigue kick good, 10:50 (AKR 14-7)

Third quarter

- AKR - Conor Hundley 1-yard TD run, Stein kick good, 11:24 (AKR 21-7)
- AKR - Jerome Lane 72-yard TD pass from Woodson, 7:53 (AKR 28-7)

Fourth quarter

- AKR - Conor Hundley 11-yard TD run, Stein kick good, 10:08 (AKR 35-7)
- ULL - Gabe Fuselier 8-yard TD pass from Jalen Nixon, Artigue kick good, 6:22 (AKR 35-14)

Top passers

- AKR - Thomas Woodson - 13/29, 238 yards, 2 TD, INT
- ULL - Jalen Nixon - 11/20, 96 yards, TD, INT

Top rushers

- AKR - Thomas Woodson - 8 carries, 93 yards, TD
- ULL - Elijah McGuire - 16 carries, 83 yards, TD

Top receivers

- AKR - Jerome Lane - reception, 72 yards, TD
- ULL - Gabe Fuselier - 5 receptions, 50 yards, TD

=== At Louisiana Tech ===
Louisiana-Lafayette at Louisiana Tech – Game summary

Quarter	1	2	3	4	Total
Ragin' Cajuns	7	0	7	0	14
Bulldogs	7	22	7	7	43

at Joe Aillet Stadium, Ruston, LA

- Date: October 3
- Game time: 6:00 p.m. CST
- Game weather: 68 °F (20 °C); clear
- Game attendance: 26,910
- Referee: Matt Austin
- TV: ASN

Game information

First quarter

- ULL - Elijah McGuire 49-yard TD pass from Jalen Nixon, Stevie Artigue kick good, 13:06 (ULL 7-0)
- LT - Trent Taylor 8-yard TD pass from Jeff Driskel, Jonathon Barnes kick good, 8:39 (TIE 7-7)

Second quarter

- LT - Driskel 19-yard TD run, Barnes kick good, 12:36 (LT 14-7)
- LT - Team defensive safety, 11:09 (LT 16-7)
- LT - Barnes 50-yard field goal, 7:00 (LT 19-7)
- LT - Barnes 41-yard field goal, 0:17 (LT 22-7)
- LT - Bryson Abraham 50-yard interception return for TD, Barnes kick good, 0:00 (LT 29-7)

Third quarter

- LT - Marcus Gains 72-yard TD pass from Driskel, Barnes kick good, 13:26 (LT 36-7)
- ULL - Nixon 5-yard TD run, Artigue kick good, 1:23 (LT 36-14)

Fourth quarter

- LT - Kenneth Dixon 6-yard TD run, Barnes kick good, (LT 43-14)

Top passers

- LT - Jeff Driskel - 20/33, 290 yards, 2 TD
- ULL - Jalen Nixon, 17/33, 161 yards, TD, INT

Top rushers

- LT - Kenneth Dixon - 22 carries, 59 yards, TD
- ULL - Elijah McGuire - 12 carries, 84 yards

Top receivers

- LT - Marcus Gains - 8 receptions, 165 yards, TD
- ULL - Elijah McGuire - 6 receptions, 70 yards, TD

=== Texas State ===
Texas State at Louisiana-Lafayette – Game summary

Quarter	1	2	3	4	Total
Bobcats	7	7	7	6	27
Ragin' Cajuns	7	7	28	7	49

at Cajun Field, Lafayette, LA

- Date: October 10
- Game time: 6:00 p.m. CST
- Game weather: 81 °F (27 °C); clear, sunny
- Game attendance: 21,377
- Referee: Jeff Hilyer
- TV: ESPN3

Game information

First quarter

- TXST - Robert Lowe 37-yard TD pass from Tyler Jones, James Sherman kick good, 9:52 (TXST 7-0)
- ULL - Al Riles 22-yard TD pass from Jalen Nixon, Stevie Artigue kick good, 5:05 (TIE 7-7)

Second quarter

- TXST - Jones 31-yard TD run, Sherman kick good, 12:27 (TXST 14-7)
- ULL - Jamal Robinson 17-yard TD pass from Nixon, Artigue kick good, 0:35 (TIE 14-14)

Third quarter

- ULL - Robinson 31-yard TD pass from Nixon, Artigue kick good, 12:33 (ULL 21-14)
- ULL - Elijah McGuire 3-yard TD run, Artigue kick good, 9:17 (ULL 28-14)
- ULL - Nixon 18-yard TD run, Artigue kick good, 2:31 (ULL 35-14)
- TXST - Brandon Smith 95-yard kickoff return for TD, Sherman kick good, 2:17 (ULL 35-21)
- ULL - Jeryl Brazil 100-yard kickoff return for TD, Artigue kick good, 2:02 (ULL 42-21)

Fourth quarter

- TXST - Tyler Siudzinski 1-yard TD run, Sherman kick blocked, 9:06 (ULL 42-27)
- ULL - Torrey Pierce 2-yard TD run, Artigue kick good, 6:39 (ULL 49-27)

Top passers

- ULL - Jalen Nixon - 22/29, 238 yards, 3 TD
- TXST - Tyler Jones - 13/33, 178 yards, TD

Top rushers

- ULL - Elijah McGuire - 28 carries, 170 yards, TD
- TXST - Tyler Jones - 11 carries, 65 yards, TD

Top receivers

- ULL - Al Riles - 9 receptions, 98 yards, TD
- TXST - C.J. Best - 9 receptions, 70 yards

=== At Arkansas State ===
Louisiana-Lafayette at Arkansas State – Game summary

Quarter	1	2	3	4	Total
Ragin' Cajuns	0	14	7	6	27
Red Wolves	13	21	3	0	37

at Centennial Bank Stadium, Jonesboro, AR

- Date: October 20
- Game time: 7:00 p.m. CST
- Game weather: 70 °F (21 °C); mostly clear
- Game attendance: 20,495
- Referee: Charles Lewis
- TV: ESPN2
- [www.espn.com/college-football/game/_/gameId/400787454]

Game information

First quarter

- ARST - Michael Gordon 7-yard TD run, Drew White kick no good, 8:13 (ARST 6-0)
- ARST - Johnston White 21-yard TD run, JD Houston kick good, 1:15 (ARST 13-0)

Second quarter

- ARST - Darion Griswold 2-yard TD pass from Fredi Knighten, Houston kick good, 13:24 (ARST 20-0)
- ARST - Cody Brown 30-yard interception return for TD, Houston kick good, 11:29 (ARST 27-0)
- ULL - Jalen Nixon 75-yard TD run, Stevie Artigue kick good, 11:16 (ARST 27-7)
- ARST - Chris Murray 46-yard TD pass from Knighten, Houston kick good, 3:55 (ARST 34-7)
- ULL - Elijah McGuire 8-yard TD run, Artigue kick good, 0:25 (ARST 34-14)

Third quarter

- ARST - Houston 42-yard field goal, 2:35 (ARST 37-14)
- ULL - Al Riles 17-yard TD pass from Nixon, Artigue kick good, 0:05 (ARST 37-21)

Fourth quarter

- ULL - McGuire 20-yard TD pass from Nixon, two-point conversion run no good, 11:02 (ARST 37-27)

Top passers

- ARST - Fredi Knighten - 8/19, 105 yards, 2 TD, INT
- ULL - Jalen Nixon - 17/44, 253 yards, 2 TD, 2 INT

Top rushers

- ARST - Warren Wand - 9 carries, 98 yards
- ULL - Jalen Nixon - 19 carries, 201 yards, TD

Top receivers

- ARST - Chris Murray - reception, 46 yards, TD
- ULL - Elijah McGuire - 10 receptions, 134 yards, TD

=== Louisiana–Monroe ===
Louisiana-Monroe at Louisiana-Lafayette – Game summary

Quarter	1	2	3	4	Total
Warhawks	14	10	0	0	24
Ragin' Cajuns	3	6	7	14	30

at Cajun Field, Lafayette, LA

- Date: October 31
- Game time: 4:00 p.m. CST
- Game weather: 68 °F (20 °C); light drizzle
- Game attendance: 17,410
- Referee: Jeff Hilyer
- TV: ESPN3

Game information

First quarter

- ULL - Stevie Artigue 40-yard field goal, 13:27 (ULL 3-0)
- ULM - Marcus Green 27-yard TD pass from Garrett Smith, Craig Ford kick good, 8:03 (ULM 7-3)
- ULM - Ajalen Holley 29-yard TD pass from Smith, Ford kick good, 3:28 (ULM 14-3)

Second quarter

- ULL - Artigue 41-yard field goal, 14:14 (ULM 14-6)
- ULL - Artigue 33-yard field goal, 6:53 (ULM 14-9)
- ULM - Kaylon Watson 53-yard TD pass from Smith, Ford kick good, 6:14 (ULM 21-9)
- ULM - Ford 29-yard field goal, 0:35 (ULM 24-9)

Third quarter

- ULL - Elijah McGuire 5-yard TD run, Artigue kick good, 10:50 (ULM 24-16)

Fourth quarter

- ULL - Brooks Haack 13-yard TD run, two-point conversion pass no good, 7:21 (ULM 24-22)
- ULL - Jamal Robinson 64-yard TD pass from Haack, McGuire two-point conversion run good, 3:10 (ULL 30-24)

Top passers

- ULL - Brooks Haack - 6/13, 85 yards, TD
- ULM - Garrett Smith - 16/35, 265 yards, 3 TD

Top rushers

- ULL - Elijah McGuire - 19 carries, 59 yards, TD
- ULM - Garrett Smith - 19 carries, 33 yards

Top receivers

- ULL - Jamal Robinson - 4 receptions, 92 yards, TD
- ULM - Ajalen Holley - 6 receptions, 98 yards, TD

=== At Georgia State ===
Louisiana-Lafayette at Georgia State – Game summary

Quarter	1	2	3	4	Total
Ragin' Cajuns	17	0	3	3	23
Panthers	7	7	7	0	21

at Georgia Dome, Atlanta, GA

- Date: November 7
- Game time: 1:00 p.m. CST
- Game weather: N/A (Domed stadium)
- Game attendance: 10,070
- Referee: Jason Autrey
- TV: ESPN3

Game information

First quarter

- ULL - Stevie Artigue 40-yard field goal, 10:48 (ULL 3-0)
- ULL - Montrel Carter 0-yard return for TD of blocked punt, Artigue kick good, 8:42 (ULL 10-0)
- GSU - Keith Rucker 8-yard TD pass from Nick Arbuckle, Wil Lutz kick good, 6:06 (ULL 10-7)
- ULL - Al Riles 4-yard TD pass from Brooks Haack, Artigue kick good, 0:55 (ULL 17-7)

Second quarter

- GSU - Rucker 3-yard TD pass from Arbuckle, Lutz kick good, 9:08 (ULL 17-14)

Third quarter

- GSU - Donovan Harden 3-yard TD pass from Arbuckle, Lutz kick good, 5:27 (GSU 21-17)
- ULL - Artigue 49-yard field goal, 1:30 (GSU 21-20)

Fourth quarter

- ULL - Artigue 21-yard field goal, 6:59 (ULL 23-21)

Top passers

- ULL - Brooks Haack - 18/25, 162 yards, TD
- GSU - Nick Arbuckle - 22/38, 313 yards, 3 TD, INT

Top rushers

- ULL - Elijah McGuire - 21 carries, 73 yards
- GSU - Demarcus Kirk - 14 carries, 85 yards

Top receivers

- ULL - Al Riles - 8 receptions, 103 yards, TD
- GSU - Penny Hart - 5 receptions, 97 yards

=== At South Alabama ===
Louisiana-Lafayette at South Alabama – Game summary

Quarter	1	2	3	4	Total
Ragin' Cajuns	6	0	7	12	25
Jaguars	7	10	0	15	32

at Ladd-Peebles Stadium, Mobile, AL

- Date: November 12
- Game time: 6:30 p.m. CST
- Game weather: 66 °F (19 °C); partly cloudy
- Game attendance: 14,096
- Referee: Jason McArthur
- TV: ESPNU

Game information

First quarter

- ULL - Jalen Nixon 18-yard TD run, Stevie Artigue kick blocked, 11:18 (ULL 6-0)
- USA - Xavier Johnson 9-yard TD run, Aleem Sunanon kick good, 8:00 (USA 7-6)

Second quarter

- USA - Sunanon 25-yard field goal, 6:20 (USA 10-6)
- USA - Gerald Everett 10-yard TD pass from Cody Clements, Sunanon kick good, 0:20 (USA 17-6)

Third quarter

- ULL - Elijah McGuire 3-yard TD run, Artigue kick good, 10:44 (USA 17-13)

Fourth quarter

- USA - Clements 7-yard TD pass from Everett, Sunanon kick good, 12:51 (USA 24-13)
- ULL - Jamal Robinson 45-yard TD pass from Brooks Haack, two-point pass conversion no good, 10:57 (USA 24-19)
- ULL - Savion Brown 85-yard interception return for TD, two point pass conversion no good, 8:26 (ULL 25-24)
- USA - Johnson 16-yard TD run, Clements run for two-point conversion, 3:32 (USA 32-25)

Top passers

- USA - Cody Clements - 17/28, 281 yards, TD, INT
- ULL - Brooks Haack - 21/34, 270 yards, TD, INT

Top rushers

- USA - Xavier Johnson - 23 carries, 118 yards, 2 TD
- ULL - Jalen Nixon - 6 carries, 30 yards, TD

Top receivers

- USA - Braedon Bowman - 2 receptions, 69 yards
- ULL - Jamal Robinson - 10 receptions, 188 yards, TD

=== New Mexico State ===
New Mexico State at Louisiana-Lafayette – Game summary

Quarter	1	2	3	4	Total
Aggies	3	17	7	10	37
Ragin' Cajuns	7	10	3	14	34

at Cajun Field, Lafayette, LA

- Date: November 21
- Game time: 4:00 p.m. CST
- Game weather: 63 °F (17 °C); overcast
- Game attendance: 17,023
- Referee: Charles Lewis
- TV: ESPN3

Game information

First quarter

- NMSU - Parker Davidson 44-yard field goal, 5:11 (NMSU 3-0)
- ULL - Al Riles 20-yard TD pass from Brooks Haack, Stevie Artigue kick good, 3:50 (ULL 7-3)

Second quarter

- NMSU - Tyrain Taylor 58-yard TD pass from Andrew Allen, Davidson kick good, 14:08 (NMSU 10-7)
- NMSU - Davidson 33-yard field goal, 10:08 (NMSU 13-7)
- ULL - Elijah McGuire 64 yard TD run, Aaron Bird kick good, 9:04 (ULL 14-13)
- NMSU - Gregory Hogan, 21-yard TD pass from Allen, Davidson kick good, 6:41 (NMSU 20-14)
- ULL - Bird 23-yard field goal, 1:27 (NMSU 20-17)

Third quarter

- ULL - Bird 31-yard field goal, 5:27 (TIE 20-20)
- NMSU - Teldrick Morgan 23-yard TD pass from Allen, Davidson kick good, 1:25 (NMSU 27-20)

Fourth quarter

- ULL - McGuire 27-yard TD run, Bird kick good, 10:37 (TIE 27-27)
- ULL - Jamal Robinson 31-yard TD pass from Brooks Haack, Bird kick good, 6:27 (ULL 34-27)
- NMSU - Hogan 23-yard TD pass from Allen, Davidson kick good, 3:59 (TIE 34-34)
- NMSU - Davidson 21-yard field goal, 1:29 (NMSU 37-34)

Top passers

- NMSU - Andrew Allen - 13/31, 243 yards, 4 TD
- ULL - Brooks Haack - 24/37, 283 yards, 2 TD, INT

Top rushers

- NMSU - Larry Rose III - 27 carries, 191 yards
- ULL - Elijah McGuire - 18 carries, 159 yards, 2 TD

Top receivers

- NMSU - Tyrain Taylor - 3 receptions, 91 yards, TD
- ULL - Jamal Robinson - 12 receptions, 183 yards, TD

=== At Appalachian State ===
Louisiana-Lafayette at Appalachian State – Game summary

Quarter	1	2	3	4	Total
Ragin' Cajuns	0	0	0	7	7
Mountaineers	7	7	7	7	28

at Kidd Brewer Stadium, Boone, NC

- Date: November 28
- Game time: 1:00 p.m. CST
- Game weather: 59 °F (15 °C); overcast
- Game attendance: 16,123
- Referee: Kevin Stine
- TV: ESPN3

Game information

First quarter

- APST - Marcus Cox 9-yard TD run, Zach Matics kick good, 9:34 (APST 7-0)

Second quarter

- APST - Cox 1-yard TD run, Matics kick good, 14:03 (APST 14-0)

Third quarter

- APST - Jalin Moore 54-yard TD run, Matics kick good, 6:44 (APST 21-0)

Fourth quarter

- APST - Michael Moll 2-yard TD pass from Taylor Lamb, Matics kick good, 6:34 (APST 28-0)
- ULL - Jordan Davis 20-yard TD run, Aaron Bird kick good, 0:57 (APST 28-7)

Top passers

- APST - Taylor Lamb - 14/21, 172 yards, TD
- ULL - Brooks Haack - 13/22, 128 yards

Top rushers

- APST - Jalin Moore - 13 carries, 104 yards, TD
- ULL - Elijah McGuire - 16 carries, 43 yards

Top receivers

- APST - Malachi Jones - 3 receptions, 58 yards
- ULL - Jamal Robinson - 7 receptions, 66 yards

=== Troy ===
Troy at Louisiana-Lafayette – Game summary

Quarter	1	2	3	4	Total
Trojans	24	0	17	0	41
Ragin' Cajuns	0	10	7	0	17

at Cajun Field, Lafayette, LA

- Date: December 5
- Game time: 4:00 p.m. CST
- Game weather: 65 °F (18 °C); sunny
- Game attendance: 22,264
- Referee: Jason Autrey
- TV: ESPN3

Game information

First quarter

- TROY - Brandon Burks 23-yard TD pass from Brandon Silver, Jed Solomon kick good, 12:34 (TROY 7-0)
- TROY - Teddy Ruben 15-yard TD pass from Silvers, Solomon kick good, 6:37 (TROY 14-0)
- TROY - Solomon 39-yard field goal, 2:57 (TROY 17-0)
- TROY - Ruben 62-yard TD pass from Silvers, Solomon kick good, 0:47 (TROY 24-0)

Second quarter

- ULL - Elijah McGuire 18-yard TD run, Carlos Alvarez kick good, 13:00 (TROY 24-7)
- ULL - Alvarez 41-yard field goal, 0:35 (TROY 24-10)

Third quarter

- ULL - McGuire 7-yard TD pass from Jordan Davis, Alvarez kick good, 10:51 (TROY 24-17)
- TROY - Jarvis Bentley 67-yard TD pass from Silvers, Solomon kick good, 8:56 (TROY 31-17)
- TROY - Solomon 21-yard field goal, 3:10 (TROY 34-17)
- TROY - Demetrius Cain 17-yard fumble return for TD, Solomon kick good, 2:31 (TROY 41-17)

Top passers

- TROY - Brandon Silvers - 22/28, 320 yards, 4 TD
- ULL - Jordan Davis - 19/33, 196 yards, TD

Top rushers

- TROY - Brandon Burks - 25 carries, 118 yards
- ULL - Elijah McGuire - 15 carries, 86 yards, TD

Top receivers

- TROY - Teddy Ruben - 8 receptions, 131 yards, 2 TD
- ULL - Devin Scott - 4 receptions, 74 yards
