= Xavier Woodson-Luster =

American football player (born 1995)

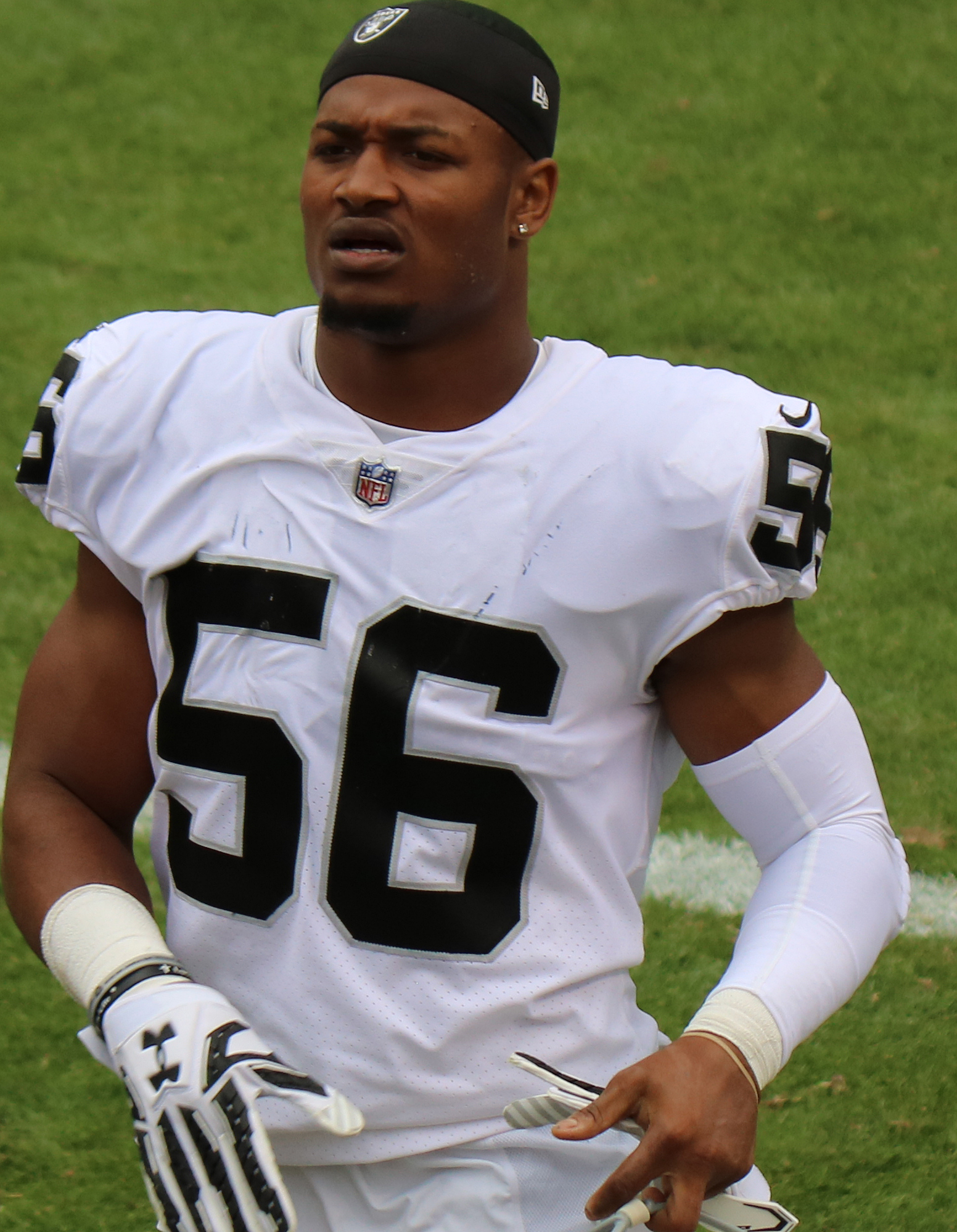
- Woodson-Luster in 2017.

Profile
- Position: Linebacker

Personal information
- Born: August 6, 1995 (age 31); Eufaula, Alabama
- Listed height: 6 ft 1 in (1.85 m)
- Listed weight: 220 lb (100 kg)

Career information
- High school: Eufaula (Eufaula, Alabama)
- College: Arkansas State
- NFL draft: 2017: undrafted

Career history
- Oakland Raiders (2017); Buffalo Bills (2017–2018)*; Cleveland Browns (2018); Houston Texans (2019); Ottawa Redblacks (2022)*; Fundidores de Monterrey (2023)
- * Offseason or practice squad member only

Awards and highlights
- 2× Second-team All-Sun Belt (2015, 2016)

Career NFL statistics
- Total tackles: 11
- Sacks: 0
- Forced fumbles: 0
- Fumble recoveries: 0
- Interceptions: 0
- Stats at Pro Football Reference

Xavier Woodson-Luster (born August 6, 1995) is an American football linebacker who last played for the Fundidores de Monterrey of the Liga de Fútbol Americano Profesional (LFA). He played college football at Arkansas State. Woodson-Luster has also been a member of the Oakland Raiders, Buffalo Bills, Cleveland Browns and Houston Texans.

== Professional career ==
=== Oakland Raiders ===
Woodson-Luster signed with the Oakland Raiders as an undrafted free agent on May 5, 2017. He was waived on September 2, 2017, but was re-signed on September 5. He was waived by the Raiders on December 20, 2017.

=== Buffalo Bills ===
On December 26, 2017, Woodson-Luster was signed to the Buffalo Bills' practice squad. He signed a reserve/future contract with the Bills on January 10, 2018. On September 1, 2018, Woodson-Luster was waived by the Bills.

=== Cleveland Browns ===
Woodson-Luster was signed to the Cleveland Browns' practice squad on October 13, 2018. He was promoted to the active roster on October 16, 2018. He was waived on October 25, 2018 and re-signed to the practice squad five days later. He was promoted back to the active roster on December 13, 2018. He was waived on May 6, 2019.

=== Houston Texans ===
On May 13, 2019, Woodson-Luster signed with the Houston Texans. On August 31, 2019, Woodson-Luster was waived/injured by the Texans and placed on injured reserve. He was waived from injured reserve on October 7, 2019.

=== Ottawa Redblacks ===
On May 11, 2022, Woodson-Luster signed with the Ottawa Redblacks of the Canadian Football League (CFL).

=== Fundidores de Monterrey ===
In February 2023, Woodson-Luster signed with the Fundidores de Monterrey of the Liga de Fútbol Americano Profesional (LFA).
