= Ja'Bril Rawls =

American football player

No. 6 – Florida State Seminoles
- Position: Cornerback
- Class: Redshirt Junior

Personal information
- Listed height: 6 ft 1 in (1.85 m)
- Listed weight: 185 lb (84 kg)

Career information
- High school: Pensacola Catholic (Pensacola, Florida)
- College: Florida State (2023–present)
- Stats at ESPN

Ja'Bril Rawls is an American college football cornerback for the Florida State Seminoles.

== Early life ==
Rawls attended Pensacola Catholic High School in Pensacola, Florida. During his high school career he had 1,555 all-purpose yards, 98 tackles, six interceptions, three punt return touchdowns and two kickoff return touchdowns. He committed to Florida State University to play college football.

== College career ==
As a freshman at Florida State in 2023, Rawls played in three games, recording four tackles, and redshirted. He played in 11 games his redshirt freshman season in 2024 and had 14 tackles. As a first year starter in 2025, Rawls started the first seven games of the season before suffering a season-ending injury. He finished the year with 40 tackles and an interception. After the season, he entered the transfer portal but ultimately decided to return to Florida State for the 2026 season.
