= 2015 Sun Belt Conference football season =

- League: NCAA Division I FBS (Football Bowl Subdivision)
- Sport: Football
- Duration: September 2015-December 2015
- Teams: 11
- Total attendance: 1,108,524
- TV partner(s): ESPN, CST

2016 NFL Draft
- Top draft pick: DE Ronald Blair, Appalachian State
- Picked by: San Francisco 49ers, 142nd overall

Regular season
- Season champions: Arkansas State
- Runners-up: Appalachian State
- Season MVP: Nick Arbuckle
- Top scorer: Austin Rehkow (108 points)

Football seasons
- 2014 2016

2015 Sun Belt Conference football standings
| | Conf. | | | Overall |
| Team | W | | L | W | | L |
|---|---|---|---|---|---|---|
| Arkansas State $ | 8 | – | 0 | 9 | – | 4 |
| Appalachian State | 7 | – | 1 | 11 | – | 2 |
| Georgia Southern | 6 | – | 2 | 9 | – | 4 |
| Georgia State | 5 | – | 3 | 6 | – | 7 |
| South Alabama | 3 | – | 5 | 5 | – | 7 |
| Idaho | 3 | – | 5 | 4 | – | 8 |
| Louisiana–Lafayette | 3 | – | 5 | 4 | – | 8 |
| Troy | 3 | – | 5 | 4 | – | 8 |
| New Mexico State | 3 | – | 5 | 3 | – | 9 |
| Texas State | 2 | – | 6 | 3 | – | 9 |
| Louisiana–Monroe | 1 | – | 7 | 2 | – | 11 |
$ – Conference champion

The 2015 Sun Belt Conference football season was the 15th college football season for the Sun Belt Conference. During the 2015 season, eleven schools competed in Sun Belt football: Appalachian State, Arkansas State, Georgia State, Georgia Southern, Idaho, Louisiana–Lafayette, Louisiana–Monroe, New Mexico State, South Alabama, Texas State and Troy.

On September 1, 2015, it was announced that Coastal Carolina will join the Sun Belt Conference, moving up from the FCS Big South Conference. They began competing in Sun Belt football starting in 2017.

== Previous season ==
The conference title was won by Georgia Southern, in its first year as both a Sun Belt member and an FBS program. The Eagles became only the third team to win a conference championship in their first FBS season. The other two schools to accomplish this feat were Nevada, Big West Conference champions in 1992, and Marshall, which won the Mid-American Conference crown in 1997. Georgia Southern also became the first team ever to go unbeaten in conference play in its first FBS season (both the 1992 Nevada and 1997 Marshall teams lost once in conference play).

Louisiana–Lafayette, South Alabama, and Arkansas State were all invited to bowl games. The SBC went 1–2 in bowls with the Ragin' Cajuns winning their 4th straight R+L Carriers New Orleans Bowl.

== Preseason ==
The following preseason awards and honors were announced

=== Award watch lists ===
The following Sun Belt players were named to preseason award watch lists:

Walter Camp Award:

- Elijah McGuire – Louisiana-Lafayette

Lou Groza Award:

- Aleem Sunanon - South Alabama

Davey O'Brien Award:

- Fredi Knighten – Arkansas State

Mackey Award:

- Darion Griswold - Arkansas State
- Joel Ruiz - Georgia State

Ray Guy Award:

- Luke Ferguson - Arkansas State
- Austin Rehkow - Idaho

Rimington Trophy:

- Dalton Bennett - Troy
- Jesse Chapman - Appalachian State
- Joseph Scelfo - South Alabama

Manning Award:

- Fredi Knighten - Arkansas State
- Kevin Ellison – Georgia Southern

Thorpe Award:

- Doug Middleton – Appalachian State
- Mitch Lane – UL Monroe
- Montres Kitchens – Troy
- David Mims II – Texas State

Paul Hornung Award:

- Elijah McGuire - Louisiana-Lafayette
- Rashon Ceaser - UL Monroe
- Teldrick Morgan - New Mexico State

Lombardi Award:

- Ronald Blair - Appalachian State
- John Law - Appalachian State
- Ja’Von Rolland–Jones - Arkansas State
- Chris Stone - Arkansas State
- Darien Foreman - Georgia Southern
- Joseph Peterson - Georgia State
- Marc Millan - Idaho
- Mykhael Quave - Louisiana-Lafayettee
- Dominique Tovell - Louisiana-Lafayette
- Gerrand Johnson - UL Monroe
- Hunter Kissinger - UL Monroe
- Isaiah Folasa-Lutui - New Mexico State
- Chris May - South Alabama
- Joseph Scelfo - South Alabama
- Adrian Bellard - Texas State
- Dalton Bennett - Troy
- Tyler Roberts - Troy

Doak Walker Award:

- Marcus Cox - Appalachian State
- Michael Gordon – Arkansas State
- Matt Breida – Georgia Southern
- Elijah McGuire – Louisiana-Lafayette
- Robert Lowe – Texas State
- Brandon Burks – Troy

Biletnikoff Award:

- Donovan Harden – Georgia State
- Teldrick Morgan – New Mexico State
- Rashon Ceaser – UL Monroe
- Ajalen Holley – UL Monroe

=== Sun Belt Media Day ===
Sun Belt Conference Media Day was held on July 20, 2015 in the Mercedes-Benz Superdome in New Orleans, Louisiana.

- Preseason Offensive Player of the Year - Elijah McGuire (RB, Louisiana-Lafayette)
- Preseason Defensive Player of the Year - David Mims (DB, Texas State)

==== Coaches Poll ====
- Georgia Southern - 110 (6)
- Louisiana-Lafayette - 108 (3)
- Arkansas State - 96 (1)
- Appalachian State - 82
- Texas State - 78
- South Alabama - 68 (1)
- UL Monroe - 59
- Troy - 39
- Georgia State - 32
- New Mexico State - 30
- Idaho - 24

==== Preseason All–Conference Team ====
Offense

QB Fredi Knighten (Arkansas State)
RB Matt Breida (Georgia Southern)
RB Elijah McGuire (Louisiana-Lafayette)
WR J. D. McKissic (Arkansas State)
WR Donovan Harden (Georgia State)
WR Rashon Ceaser (UL Monroe)
TE Joel Ruiz (Georgia State)
OL Jesse Chapman (Appalachian State)
OL Darien Foreman (Georgia Southern)
OL Chris May (South Alabama)
OL Joseph Scelfo (South Alabama)
OL Adrian Bellard (Texas State)

Defense

DL Chris Stone (Arkansas State)
DL Ronald Blair (Appalachian State)
DL Gerrand Johnson (UL Monroe)
DL Ja'Von Rolland-Jones (Arkansas State)
LB John Law (Appalachian State)
LB Xavier Woodson (Arkansas State)
LB Joseph Peterson (Georgia State)
DB Doug Middleton (Appalachian State)
DB Mitch Lane (UL Monroe)
DB David Mims II (Texas State)
DB Montres Kitchens (Troy)

Specialists

PK Aleem Sunanon (South Alabama)
P Austin Rehkow (Idaho)
RS Blaise Taylor (Arkansas State)

== Coaches ==
Note: Stats shown are before the beginning of the season

| Team | Head coach | Years at school | Overall record | Record at school | Sun Belt record |
|---|---|---|---|---|---|
| Appalachian State | Scott Satterfield | 3 | 11-13 | 11-13 | 6-2 |
| Arkansas State | Blake Anderson | 2 | 14-9 | 14-9 | 11-3 |
| Georgia Southern | Willie Fritz | 2 | 146–65 | 9-3 | 8–0 |
| Georgia State | Trent Miles | 3 | 21-59 | 1-23 | 0–15 |
| Idaho | Paul Petrino | 3 | 2-21 | 2-21 | 1-7 |
| Louisiana–Lafayette | Mark Hudspeth | 5 | 102-37 | 36-16 | 24-7 |
| Louisiana–Monroe | Todd Berry | 6 | 56-93 | 27-34 | 20-19 |
| New Mexico State | Doug Martin | 3 | 33-73 | 4-20 | 1-7 |
| South Alabama | Joey Jones | 7 | 40-35 | 37-28 | 10-13 |
| Troy | Neal Brown | 1 | 0-0 | 0-0 | 0-0 |
| Texas State | Dennis Franchione | 7 | 210–126–2 | 36-34 | 7-8 |

== Sun Belt vs. Power Five Conference matchups ==
| Date | Visitor | Home | Conference | Score | Notes |
|---|---|---|---|---|---|
| September 5 | UL Monroe | #9 Georgia | SEC | L 14–51 | |
| September 5 | Troy | NC State | ACC | L 21–49 | |
| September 5 | Louisiana-Lafayette | Kentucky | SEC | L 33–40 | |
| September 5 | Georgia Southern | West Virginia | Big XII | L 0–44 | |
| September 5 | New Mexico State | Florida | SEC | L 13–61 | |
| September 5 | Texas State | #10 Florida State | ACC | L 16–59 | |
| September 5 | Arkansas State | #8 USC | Pac-12 | L 6–55 | |
| September 12 | Appalachian State | #11 Clemson | ACC | L 10–41 | |
| September 12 | #22 Missouri | Arkansas State | SEC | L 20–27 | |
| September 12 | South Alabama | Nebraska | Big Ten | L 9–48 | |
| September 12 | Idaho | #8 USC | Pac-12 | L 9–59 | |
| September 19 | Troy | #24 Wisconsin | Big Ten | L 3–28 | |
| September 19 | Georgia State | #12 Oregon | Pac-12 | L 28–61 | |
| September 26 | NC State | South Alabama | ACC | L 13–63 | |
| September 26 | UL Monroe | #12 Alabama | SEC | L 0–34 | |
| October 10 | Troy | Mississippi State | SEC | L 17–45 | |
| October 10 | New Mexico State | Ole Miss | SEC | L 3–52 | |
| November 21 | Idaho | Auburn | SEC | L 34–56 | |
| November 21 | Georgia Southern | Georgia | SEC | L 17–23 ^{OT} | |

== Regular season ==
Index to colors and formatting
Sun Belt member won
Sun Belt member lost
Sun Belt teams in **bold**

All dates, times, and TV are tentative and subject to change.

Start times are listed as Central Time Zone

Rankings reflect that of the AP poll for that week until Week 10 when the first CFP Poll is released.

=== Week 1 ===
| Date | Time | Visiting team | Home team | Site | TV | Result | Attendance |
|---|---|---|---|---|---|---|---|
| September 3 | 8:00 p.m. | Ohio | **Idaho** | Kibbie Dome • Moscow, ID | ESPN3 | **L** 28–48 | 11,587 |
| September 4 | 2:30 p.m. | Charlotte | **Georgia State** | Georgia Dome • Atlanta, GA | ESPNU | **L** 20–23 | 10,252 |
| September 5 | 11:00 a.m. | **UL Monroe** | #9 Georgia | Sanford Stadium • Athens, GA | ESPN3 | **L** 14–51 | 92,746 |
| September 5 | 2:30 p.m. | Howard | **Appalachian State** | Kidd Brewer Stadium • Boone, NC | ESPN3 | **W** 49–0 | 24,314 |
| September 5 | 5:00 p.m. | **Troy** | NC State | Carter–Finley Stadium • Raleigh, NC | ESPN3 | **L** 21–49 | 57,451 |
| September 5 | 5:00 p.m. | Gardner-Webb | **South Alabama** | Ladd–Peebles Stadium • Mobile, AL | ESPN3 | **W** 33–23 | 12,289 |
| September 5 | 6:00 p.m. | **Louisiana-Lafayette** | Kentucky | Commonwealth Stadium • Lexington, KY | ESPNU | **L** 33–40 | 62,933 |
| September 5 | 6:30 p.m. | **Georgia Southern** | West Virginia | Mountaineer Field • Morgantown, WV | FSN | **L** 0–44 | 55,182 |
| September 5 | 6:30 p.m. | **New Mexico State** | Florida | Ben Hill Griffin Stadium • Gainesville, FL | SEC Network | **L** 13–61 | 90,227 |
| September 5 | 7:00 p.m. | **Texas State** | #10 Florida State | Doak Campbell Stadium • Tallahassee, FL | ESPNews | **L** 16–59 | 80,917 |
| September 5 | 10:00 p.m. | **Arkansas State** | #8 USC | Los Angeles Memorial Coliseum • Los Angeles, CA | Pac-12 Network | **L** 6–55 | 79,809 |

Players of the week:

| Offensive | | Defensive | | Special teams | |
| Player | Team | Player | Team | Player | Team |
|---|---|---|---|---|---|
| Rashon Ceaser | UL Monroe | Bobby Baker | Georgia State | Aleem Sunanon | South Alabama |

=== Week 2 ===
| Date | Time | Visiting team | Home team | Site | TV | Result | Attendance |
|---|---|---|---|---|---|---|---|
| September 12 | 11:30 a.m. | **Appalachian State** | #11 Clemson | Memorial Stadium • Clemson, SC | ESPN3 | **L** 10–41 | 81,467 |
| September 12 | 5:00 p.m. | Western Michigan | **Georgia Southern** | Paulson Stadium • Statesboro, GA | ESPN3 | **W** 43–17 | 23,520 |
| September 12 | 6:00 p.m. | Northwestern State | **Louisiana-Lafayette** | Cajun Field • Lafayette, LA | ESPN3 | **W** 44–17 | 26,824 |
| September 12 | 6:00 p.m. | Prairie View A&M | **Texas State** | Bobcat Stadium • San Marcos, TX | ESPN3 | **W** 63–24 | 24,561 |
| September 12 | 6:00 p.m. | Charleston Southern | **Troy** | Veterans Memorial Stadium • Troy, AL | ESPN3 | **W** 44–16 | 17,517 |
| September 12 | 6:00 p.m. | #22 Missouri | **Arkansas State** | Centennial Bank Stadium • Jonesboro, AR | ESPN3 | **L** 20–27 | 29,143 |
| September 12 | 6:00 p.m. | Nicholls State | **UL Monroe** | Malone Stadium • Monroe, LA | ESPN3 | **W** 47–0 | 20,397 |
| September 12 | 7:00 p.m. | **South Alabama** | Nebraska | Memorial Stadium • Lincoln, NE | Big Ten Network | **L** 9–48 | 89,822 |
| September 12 | 7:00 p.m. | **Georgia State** | **New Mexico State** | Aggie Memorial Stadium • Las Cruces, NM | ESPN3 | **GAST** 34–32 | 27,201 |
| September 12 | 7:00 p.m. | **Idaho** | #8 USC | Los Angeles Memorial Coliseum • Los Angeles, CA | Pac-12 Network | **L** 9–59 | 72,422 |

Players of the week:

| Offensive | | Defensive | | Special teams | |
| Player | Team | Player | Team | Player | Team |
|---|---|---|---|---|---|
| Matt Breida | Georgia Southern | Jaden Wright | New Mexico State | Teddy Ruben | Troy |

=== Week 3 ===
| Date | Time | Visiting team | Home team | Site | TV | Result | Attendance |
|---|---|---|---|---|---|---|---|
| September 19 | 1:00 p.m. | **Georgia State** | #12 Oregon | Autzen Stadium • Eugene, OR | Pac-12 Network | **L** 28–61 | 56,859 |
| September 19 | 2:30 p.m. | **Troy** | #24 Wisconsin | Camp Randall Stadium • Madison, WI | Big Ten Network | **L** 3–28 | 77,157 |
| September 19 | 4:00 p.m. | Wofford | **Idaho** | Kibbie Dome • Moscow, ID | ESPN3 | **W** 41–38 | 11,633 |
| September 19 | 5:00 p.m. | The Citadel | **Georgia Southern** | Paulson Stadium • Statesboro, GA | ESPN3 | **W** 48–13 | 24,872 |
| September 19 | 6:00 p.m. | Missouri State | **Arkansas State** | Centennial Bank Stadium • Jonesboro, AR | ESPN3 | **W** 70–7 | 26,634 |
| September 19 | 6:00 p.m. | Southern Miss | **Texas State** | Bobcat Stadium • San Marcos, TX | ESPN3 | **L** 50–56 | 27,252 |
| September 19 | 7:00 p.m. | **South Alabama** | San Diego State | Qualcomm Stadium • San Diego, CA | ESPN3 | **W** 34–27 ^{OT} | 18,194 |
| September 19 | 7:00 p.m. | UTEP | **New Mexico State** | Aggie Memorial Stadium • Las Cruces, NM | Mountain West Network | **L** 47–50 ^{OT} | 17,210 |

- **Open Week: Appalachian State, Louisiana-Lafayette, UL Monroe**

Players of the week:

| Offensive | | Defensive | | Special teams | |
| Player | Team | Player | Team | Player | Team |
|---|---|---|---|---|---|
| Tyler Jones | Texas State | Jeremy Reaves | South Alabama | Aleem Sunanon (2) | South Alabama |

=== Week 4 ===
| Date | Time | Visiting team | Home team | Site | TV | Result | Attendance |
|---|---|---|---|---|---|---|---|
| September 26 | 2:30 p.m. | **Appalachian State** | Old Dominion | Foreman Field • Norfolk, VA | ASN | **W** 49–0 | 20,118 |
| September 26 | 3:00 p.m. | **UL Monroe** | #12 Alabama | Bryant–Denny Stadium • Tuscaloosa, AL | SEC Network | **L** 0–34 | 101,823 |
| September 26 | 6:00 p.m. | Akron | **Louisiana-Lafayette** | Cajun Field • Lafayette, LA | ESPN3 | **L** 14–35 | 24,679 |
| September 26 | 6:00 p.m. | **Arkansas State** | Toledo | Glass Bowl • Toledo, OH | ESPN3 | **L** 7–37 | 21,385 |
| September 26 | 7:00 p.m. | **Texas State** | Houston | TDECU Stadium • Houston, TX | ESPN3 | **L** 14–59 | 35,257 |
| September 26 | 7:00 p.m. | NC State | **South Alabama** | Ladd–Peebles Stadium • Mobile, AL | ESPNews | **L** 13–63 | 21,314 |
| September 26 | 8:00 p.m. | **Georgia Southern** | **Idaho** | Kibbie Dome • Moscow, ID | ESPN3 | **GASO** 44–20 | 14,441 |

- **Open Week: Georgia State, New Mexico State, Troy**

Players of the week:

| Offensive | | Defensive | | Special teams | |
| Player | Team | Player | Team | Player | Team |
|---|---|---|---|---|---|
| Taylor Lamb | Appalachian State | John Law | Appalachian State | J. D. McKissic | Arkansas State |

=== Week 5 ===
| Date | Time | Visiting team | Home team | Site | TV | Result | Attendance |
|---|---|---|---|---|---|---|---|
| October 3 | 2:30 p.m. | Liberty | **Georgia State** | Georgia Dome • Atlanta, GA | ESPN3 | **L** 33–41 | 11,512 |
| October 3 | 2:30 p.m. | Wyoming | **Appalachian State** | Kidd Brewer Stadium • Boone, NC | ESPN3 | **W** 31–13 | 19,345 |
| October 3 | 6:00 p.m. | **Idaho** | **Arkansas State** | Centennial Bank Stadium • Jonesboro, AR | ESPN3 | **ARST** 49–35 | 23,411 |
| October 3 | 6:00 p.m. | **Georgia Southern** | **UL Monroe** | Malone Stadium • Monroe, LA | ESPN3 | **GASO** 51–31 | 16,791 |
| October 3 | 6:00 p.m. | **South Alabama** | **Troy** | Veterans Memorial Stadium • Troy, AL | ESPN3 | **USA** 24–18 | 22,873 |
| October 3 | 6:00 p.m. | **Louisiana-Lafayette** | Louisiana Tech | Joe Aillet Stadium • Ruston, LA | ASN | **L** 14–43 | 26,910 |
| October 3 | 7:00 p.m. | **New Mexico State** | New Mexico | University Stadium • Albuquerque, NM | Root Sports | **L** 29–38 | 30,900 |

- **Open Week: Texas State**

Players of the week:

| Offensive | | Defensive | | Special teams | |
| Player | Team | Player | Team | Player | Team |
|---|---|---|---|---|---|
| Michael Gordon | Arkansas State | Kalen Jackson | South Alabama | Zach Matics | Appalachian State |

=== Week 6 ===
| Date | Time | Visiting team | Home team | Site | TV | Result | Attendance |
|---|---|---|---|---|---|---|---|
| October 10 | 11:00 a.m. | **New Mexico State** | Ole Miss | Vaught–Hemingway Stadium • Oxford, MS | SECN | **L** 3–52 | 60,154 |
| October 10 | 2:30 p.m. | **Appalachian State** | **Georgia State** | Georgia Dome • Atlanta, GA | ESPN3 | **APPST** 37–3 | 10,101 |
| October 10 | 3:00 p.m. | **Troy** | Mississippi State | Davis Wade Stadium • Starkville, MS | SECN | **L** 17–45 | 60,866 |
| October 10 | 5:00 p.m. | **UL Monroe** | Tulsa | Skelly Field at H. A. Chapman Stadium • Tulsa, OK | ESPN3 | **L** 24–34 | 17,490 |
| October 10 | 6:00 p.m. | **Texas State** | **Louisiana-Lafayette** | Cajun Field • Lafayette, LA | ESPN3 | **ULL** 49–27 | 21,377 |

- **Open Week: Arkansas State, Georgia Southern, Idaho, South Alabama**

Players of the week:

| Offensive | | Defensive | | Special teams | |
| Player | Team | Player | Team | Player | Team |
|---|---|---|---|---|---|
| Jalen Nixon | Louisiana-Lafayette | Latrell Gibbs | Appalachian State | Jeryl Brazil | Louisiana-Lafayette |

=== Week 7 ===
| Date | Time | Visiting team | Home team | Site | TV | Result | Attendance |
|---|---|---|---|---|---|---|---|
| October 13 | 7:00 p.m. | **Arkansas State** | **South Alabama** | Ladd–Peebles Stadium • Mobile, AL | ESPN2 | **ARST** 49–31 | 18,538 |
| October 17 | 2:00 p.m. | **Georgia State** | Ball State | Scheumann Stadium • Muncie, IN | ESPN3 | **W** 31–19 | 7,546 |
| October 17 | 2:30 p.m. | **Idaho** | **Troy** | Veterans Memorial Stadium • Troy, AL | ESPN3 | **Idaho** 19–16 | 20,107 |
| October 17 | 5:00 p.m. | **New Mexico State** | **Georgia Southern** | Paulson Stadium • Statesboro, GA | ESPN3 | **GASO** 56–26 | 23,551 |
| October 17 | 6:00 p.m. | **Appalachian State** | **UL Monroe** | Malone Stadium • Monroe, LA | ESPN3 | **APPST** 59–14 | 11,761 |

- **Open Week: Louisiana-Lafayette, Texas State**

Players of the week:

| Offensive | | Defensive | | Special teams | |
| Player | Team | Player | Team | Player | Team |
|---|---|---|---|---|---|
| Nick Arbuckle | Georgia State | Eric Boggs | Appalachian State | Austin Rehkow | Idaho |

=== Week 8 ===
| Date | Time | Visiting team | Home team | Site | TV | Result | Attendance |
|---|---|---|---|---|---|---|---|
| October 20 | 7:00 p.m. | **Louisiana-Lafayette** | **Arkansas State** | Centennial Bank Stadium • Jonesboro, AR | ESPN2 | **ARST** 37–27 | 20,495 |
| October 22 | 6:30 p.m. | **Georgia Southern** | **Appalachian State** | Kidd Brewer Stadium • Boone, NC | ESPNU | **APPST** 31–13 | 24,121 |
| October 24 | 4:00 p.m. | **UL Monroe** | **Idaho** | Kibbie Dome • Moscow, ID | ESPN3 | **Idaho** 27–13 | 14,414 |
| October 24 | 6:00 p.m. | **South Alabama** | **Texas State** | Bobcat Stadium • San Marcos, TX | ESPN3 | **TXST** 36–18 | 14,523 |
| October 24 | 7:00 p.m. | **Troy** | **New Mexico State** | Aggie Memorial Stadium • Las Cruces, NM | ESPN3 | **Troy** 52–7 | 10,325 |

- **Open Week: Georgia State**

Players of the week:

| Offensive | | Defensive | | Special teams | |
| Player | Team | Player | Team | Player | Team |
|---|---|---|---|---|---|
| Robert Lowe | Texas State | Cody Brown | Arkansas State | Lumi Kiba | Texas State |

=== Week 9 ===
| Date | Time | Visiting team | Home team | Site | TV | Result | Attendance |
|---|---|---|---|---|---|---|---|
| October 29 | 6:30 p.m. | **Texas State** | **Georgia Southern** | Paulson Stadium • Statesboro, GA | ESPNU | **GASO** 37–13 | 14,212 |
| October 31 | 2:30 p.m. | **Troy** | **Appalachian State** | Kidd Brewer Stadium • Boone, NC | ESPN3 | **APPST** 44–41 | 26,130 |
| October 31 | 4:00 p.m. | **UL Monroe** | **Louisiana-Lafayette** | Cajun Field • Lafayette, LA | ESPN3 | **ULL** 30–24 | 17,410 |
| October 31 | 6:00 p.m. | **Georgia State** | **Arkansas State** | Centennial Bank Stadium • Jonesboro, AR | ESPN3 | **ARST** 48–34 | 18,217 |
| October 31 | 7:00 p.m. | **Idaho** | **New Mexico State** | Aggie Memorial Stadium • Las Cruces, NM | ESPN3 | **NMSU** 55–48 | 7,546 |

- **Open Week: South Alabama**

Players of the week:

| Offensive | | Defensive | | Special teams | |
| Player | Team | Player | Team | Player | Team |
|---|---|---|---|---|---|
| Larry Rose III | New Mexico State | Ronald Blair | Appalachian State | Zach Matics | Appalachian State |

=== Week 10 ===
| Date | Time | Visiting team | Home team | Site | TV | Result | Attendance |
|---|---|---|---|---|---|---|---|
| November 5 | 6:30 p.m. | **Arkansas State** | **Appalachian State** | Kidd Brewer Stadium • Boone, NC | ESPNU | **ARST** 40–27 | 18,721 |
| November 7 | 1:00 p.m. | **Louisiana-Lafayette** | **Georgia State** | Georgia Dome • Atlanta, GA | ESPN3 | **ULL** 23–21 | 10,070 |
| November 7 | 2:00 p.m. | **Idaho** | **South Alabama** | Ladd–Peebles Stadium • Mobile, AL | ESPN3 | **USA** 52–45 | 17,651 |
| November 7 | 2:30 p.m. | **UL Monroe** | **Troy** | Veterans Memorial Stadium • Troy, AL | ESPN3 | **Troy** 51–14 | 18,041 |
| November 7 | 3:00 p.m. | **New Mexico State** | **Texas State** | Bobcat Stadium • San Marcos, TX | ESPN3 | **NMSU** 31–21 | 15,421 |

- **Open Week: Georgia Southern**

Players of the week:

| Offensive | | Defensive | | Special teams | |
| Player | Team | Player | Team | Player | Team |
|---|---|---|---|---|---|
| Larry Rose III (2) | New Mexico State | Blake Dees | South Alabama | Jed Solomon | Troy |

=== Week 11 ===
| Date | Time | Visiting team | Home team | Site | TV | Result | Attendance |
|---|---|---|---|---|---|---|---|
| November 12 | 6:30 p.m. | **Louisiana-Lafayette** | **South Alabama** | Ladd–Peebles Stadium • Mobile, AL | ESPNU | **USA** 32–25 | 14,096 |
| November 14 | 2:00 p.m. | **Arkansas State** | **UL Monroe** | Malone Stadium • Monroe, LA | ESPN3 | **ARST** 59–21 | 9,063 |
| November 14 | 2:30 p.m. | **Georgia Southern** | **Troy** | Veterans Memorial Stadium • Troy, AL | ESPN3 | **GASO** 45–10 | 18,455 |
| November 14 | 3:00 p.m. | **Georgia State** | **Texas State** | Bobcat Stadium • San Marcos, TX | ESPN3 | **GAST** 41–19 | 13,238 |
| November 14 | 4:00 p.m. | **Appalachian State** | **Idaho** | Kibbie Dome • Moscow, ID | ESPN3 | **APPST** 47–20 | 10,113 |

- **Open Week: New Mexico State**

Players of the week:

| Offensive | | Defensive | | Special teams | |
| Player | Team | Player | Team | Player | Team |
|---|---|---|---|---|---|
| Nick Arbuckle (2) | Georgia State | Chandon Sullivan | Georgia State | Jeremy Reaves | South Alabama |

=== Week 12 ===
| Date | Time | Visiting team | Home team | Site | TV | Result | Attendance |
|---|---|---|---|---|---|---|---|
| November 19 | 8:30 p.m. | **UL Monroe** | **Texas State** | Bobcat Stadium • San Marcos, TX | ESPNU | **TXST** 16–3 | 14,003 |
| November 21 | 1:00 p.m. | **South Alabama** | **Georgia State** | Georgia Dome • Atlanta, GA | ESPN3 | **GAST** 24–10 | 10,033 |
| November 21 | 3:00 p.m. | **Idaho** | Auburn | Jordan–Hare Stadium • Auburn, AL | SECN | **L** 34–56 | 87,451 |
| November 21 | 4:00 p.m. | **New Mexico State** | **Louisiana-Lafayette** | Cajun Field • Lafayette, LA | ESPN3 | **NMSU** 37–34 | 17,023 |
| November 21 | 6:00 p.m. | **Georgia Southern** | Georgia | Sanford Stadium • Athens, GA | ESPNU | **L** 17–23 ^{OT} | 92,746 |

- **Open Week: Appalachian State, Arkansas State, Troy**

Players of the week:

| Offensive | | Defensive | | Special teams | |
| Player | Team | Player | Team | Player | Team |
|---|---|---|---|---|---|
| Andrew Allen | New Mexico State | Tarris Batiste | Georgia State | Parker Davidson | New Mexico State |

=== Week 13 ===
| Date | Time | Visiting team | Home team | Site | TV | Result | Attendance |
|---|---|---|---|---|---|---|---|
| November 27 | 1:00 p.m. | Troy | **Georgia State** | Georgia Dome • Atlanta, GA | ESPN3 | **GAST** 31–21 | 10,113 |
| November 28 | 1:00 p.m. | Louisiana-Lafayette | **Appalachian State** | Kidd Brewer Stadium • Boone, NC | ESPN3 | **APPST** 28–7 | 16,124 |
| November 28 | 1:00 p.m. | South Alabama | **Georgia Southern** | Paulson Stadium • Statesboro, GA | ESPN3 | **GASO** 55–17 | 15,125 |
| November 28 | 3:00 p.m. | Arkansas State | **New Mexico State** | Aggie Memorial Stadium • Las Cruces, NM | ESPN3 | **ARST** 52–28 | 25,147 |
| November 28 | 4:00 p.m. | Texas State | **Idaho** | Kibbie Dome • Moscow, ID | ESPN3 | **Idaho** 38–31 | 7,727 |
| November 28 | 10:00 p.m. | UL Monroe | Hawaii | Aloha Stadium • Honolulu, HI | MWN | **L** 26–28 | 21,284 |

Players of the week:

| Offensive | | Defensive | | Special teams | |
| Player | Team | Player | Team | Player | Team |
|---|---|---|---|---|---|
| Freddie Knighten | Arkansas State | Eric Boggs | Appalachian State | Blaise Taylor | Arkansas State |

=== Week 14 ===
| Date | Time | Visiting team | Home team | Site | TV | Result | Attendance |
|---|---|---|---|---|---|---|---|
| December 5 | 1:00 p.m. | **Georgia State** | **Georgia Southern** | Paulson Stadium • Statesboro, GA | ESPN3 | **GAST** 34–7 | 23,401 |
| December 5 | 2:00 p.m. | **Texas State** | **Arkansas State** | Centennial Bank Stadium • Jonesboro, AR | ESPN3 | **ARST** 55–17 | 20,143 |
| December 5 | 2:00 p.m. | **New Mexico State** | **UL Monroe** | Malone Stadium • Monroe, LA | ESPN3 | **ULM** 42–35 | 7,774 |
| December 5 | 4:00 p.m. | **Troy** | **Louisiana-Lafayette** | Cajun Field • Lafayette, LA | ESPN3 | **Troy** 41–17 | 22,264 |
| December 5 | 6:30 p.m. | **Appalachian State** | **South Alabama** | Ladd–Peebles Stadium • Mobile, AL | ESPN3 | **APPST** 34–27 | 12,346 |

Players of the week:

| Offensive | | Defensive | | Special teams | |
| Player | Team | Player | Team | Player | Team |

== Bowl games ==
The Sun Belt had 4 guaranteed bowl tie-ins starting in 2015 with the addition of the Cure Bowl in Orlando, FL. Arkansas State, Appalachian State, Georgia Southern, and Georgia State represented the Sun Belt during the 2015–16 bowl season; for the latter three teams, it would be their first bowl game.

Note: All times are local

| Bowl | Date | Time | SBC team (Record) | Opponent (Record) | Site | TV | Result | Attendance |
|---|---|---|---|---|---|---|---|---|
| Raycom Media Camellia Bowl | December 19 | 4:30 p.m. | Appalachian State (10-2) | Ohio (8-4) | Cramton Bowl • Montgomery, AL | ESPN | W 31–29 | 21,395 |
| AutoNation Cure Bowl | December 19 | 6:00 p.m. | Georgia State (6-6) | San Jose State (5-7) | Orlando Citrus Bowl • Orlando, FL | CBSSN | L 16–27 | 18,536 |
| R+L Carriers New Orleans Bowl | December 19 | 8:00 p.m. | Arkansas State (9-3) | Louisiana Tech (8-4) | Mercedes-Benz Superdome • New Orleans, LA | ESPN | L 28–47 | 32,847 |
| GoDaddy Bowl | December 23 | 7:00 p.m. | Georgia Southern (8-4) | Bowling Green (10-3) | Ladd–Peebles Stadium • Mobile, AL | ESPN | W 58–27 | 28,656 |

== Players of the Year ==
2015 Sun Belt Player of the Year awards

| Award | Player | School |
|---|---|---|
| Student-Athlete of the Year | Nick Arbuckle | Georgia State |
| Offensive Student-Athlete of the Year | Larry Rose III | New Mexico State |
| Defensive Student-Athlete of the Year | Ronald Blair | Appalachian State |
| Freshman of the Year | Penny Hart | Georgia State |
| Coach of the Year | Trent Miles | Georgia State |

== All-Sun Belt/American Team ==
Coaches All-Conference Selections

| Position | Player | Class | Team |
|---|---|---|---|
First Team Offense
| QB | Nick Arbuckle | SR | Georgia State |
| RB | Matt Breida | JR | Georgia Southern |
| RB | Larry Rose III | SO | New Mexico State |
| WR | Robert Davis | JR | Georgia State |
| WR | Penny Hart | FR | Georgia State |
| WR | Jamal Robinson | SR | Louisiana-Lafayette |
| TE | Gerald Everett | JR | South Alabama |
| OL | Jesse Chapman | SR | Appalachian State |
| OL | Jermar Clark | JR | Arkansas State |
| OL | Colton Jackson | JR | Arkansas State |
| OL | Darien Foreman | SR | Georgia Southern |
| OL | Joseph Scelfo | JR | South Alabama |
First Team Defense
| DL | Ronald Blair | SR | Appalachian State |
| DL | Ja’Von Rolland-Jones | SO | Arkansas State |
| DL | Quinton Bradley | SR | Idaho |
| DL | Tyler Roberts | SR | Troy |
| LB | John Law | JR | Appalachian State |
| LB | Dominique Tovell | SR | Louisiana-Lafayette |
| LB | Hunter Kissinger | GR | Louisiana-Monroe |
| LB | Blake Dees | SR | South Alabama |
| DB | Latrell Gibbs | SO | Appalachian State |
| DB | Rocky Hayes | SR | Arkansas State |
| DB | Antonio Glover | SR | Georgia Southern |
| DB | Tarris Batiste | SR | Georgia State |
First Team Special Teams
| PK | Zach Matics | SR | Appalachian State |
| P | Austin Rehkow | JR | Idaho |
| RS | Derek Keaton | SR | Georgia Southern |
| AP | J. D. McKissic | SR | Arkansas State |

| Position | Player | Class | Team |
|---|---|---|---|
Second Team Offense
| QB | Fredi Knighten | SR | Arkansas State |
| RB | Marcus Cox | JR | Appalachian State |
| RB | Michael Gordon | SR | Arkansas State |
| WR | Tres Houston | SR | Arkansas State |
| WR | J. D. McKissic | SR | Arkansas State |
| WR | Teddy Ruben | SR | Troy |
| TE | Keith Rucker | JR | Georgia State |
| OL | Parker Collins | JR | Appalachian State |
| OL | Davante Harris | SR | Appalachian State |
| OL | Andy Kwon | JR | Georgia Southern |
| OL | Chris May | SR | South Alabama |
| OL | Dalton Bennett | SR | Troy |
Second Team Defense
| DL | Chris Stone | SR | Arkansas State |
| DL | Bernard Dawson | JR | Georgia Southern |
| DL | Jay Ellison | JR | Georgia Southern |
| DL | Gerrand Johnson | GR | Louisiana-Monroe |
| LB | Eric Boggs | SO | Appalachian State |
| LB | Xavier Woodson-Luster | JR | Arkansas State |
| LB | Joseph Peterson | SR | Georgia State |
| DB | Cody Brown | JR | Arkansas State |
| DB | Savion Brown | JR | Louisiana-Lafayette |
| DB | Roman Buchanan | JR | South Alabama |
| DB | Jeremy Reaves | SO | South Alabama |
| DB | Montres Kitchens | SR | Troy |
Second Team Special Teams
| PK | Austin Rehkow | JR | Idaho |
| P | Wil Lutz | SR | Georgia State |
| RS | Teddy Ruben | SR | Troy |
| AP | Teddy Ruben | SR | Troy |

Honorable Mention: Appalachian State: Barrett Burns, Taylor Lamb, Doug Middleton, Devan Stringer; Arkansas State: Darion Griswold, Khari Lain, Robert Mondie, Dijon Paschal; Georgia State: Donovan Harden, Shawanye Lawrence, Alonzo McGee, Chandon Sullivan; Georgia Southern: Ironhead Gallon, L. A. Ramsby, Antwione Williams, Caleb Williams; Idaho: Buck Cowan, Matt Linehan, Elijhaa Penny, Jordan Rose; Louisiana-Lafayette: Octravian Anderson, Elijah McGuire, Otha Peters, Chris Prater; Louisiana-Monroe: Trey Caldwell, Marcus Green, Michael Johnson, Colby Mitchell; New Mexico State: Stody Bradley, Isaiah Folasa, Anthony McMeans, Tyrian Taylor; Texas State: Adrian Bellard, Ryan Melton, Ryan Carden, Tyler Jones; South Alabama DeMarion Harper, Kalen Jackson, Xavier Johnson, Aleem Sunanon; Troy: Brandon Burks, Rashad Dillard, Antonio Garcia, Brandon Silvers.

== Home attendance ==
| Team | Stadium (Capacity) | Game 1 | Game 2 | Game 3 | Game 4 | Game 5 | Game 6 | Total | Average | % of Capacity |
|---|---|---|---|---|---|---|---|---|---|---|
| Appalachian State | Kidd Brewer Stadium (24,050) | 24,314 | 19,345 | 24,121 | 26,130 | 18,721 | 16,124 | 128,755 | 21,459 | 89.2% |
| Arkansas State | Centennial Bank Stadium (30,382) | 29,143 | 26,634 | 23,411 | 20,495 | 18,217 | 20,143 | 138,043 | 23,007 | 75.7% |
| Georgia Southern | Paulson Stadium (25,000) | 23,520 | 24,872 | 23,551 | 14,212 | 15,125 | 23,401 | 124,681 | 20,780 | 83.1% |
| Georgia State | Georgia Dome (28,155) | 10,252 | 11,512 | 10,101 | 10,070 | 10,033 | 10,113 | 62,081 | 10,347 | 36.8% |
| Idaho | Kibbie Dome (16,000) | 11,587 | 11,633 | 14,441 | 14,414 | 10,113 | 7,727 | 69,915 | 11,653 | 72.8% |
| Louisiana–Lafayette | Cajun Field (36,900) | 26,824 | 24,679 | 21,377 | 17,410 | 17,023 | 22,264 | 129,577 | 21,596 | 58.5% |
| Louisiana–Monroe | Malone Stadium (30,427) | 20,397 | 16,791 | 11,761 | 9,063 | 7,774 | N/A | 65,768 | 13,157 | 43.2% |
| New Mexico State | Aggie Memorial Stadium (30,343) | 27,201 | 17,210 | 10,325 | 7,546 | 25,147 | N/A | 87,429 | 17,486 | 57.6% |
| South Alabama | Ladd–Peebles Stadium (33,471) | 12,289 | 21,314 | 18,538 | 17,651 | 14,096 | 12,346 | 96,284 | 16,039 | 47.9% |
| Texas State | Bobcat Stadium (30,000) | 24,561 | 27,252 | 14,523 | 15,421 | 13,238 | 14,003 | 108,998 | 18,166 | 60.6% |
| Troy | Veterans Memorial Stadium (30,000) | 17,517 | 22,873 | 20,107 | 18,041 | 18,455 | N/A | 96,993 | 19,399 | 64.7% |

== NFL draft ==
The following list includes all Sun Belt players who were drafted in the 2016 NFL draft.

| Round # | Pick # | NFL team | Player | Position | College |
|---|---|---|---|---|---|
| 5 | 142 | San Francisco 49ers | Ronald Blair | DE | Appalachian State |
| 5 | 169 | Detroit Lions | Antwione Williams | LB | Georgia Southern |
| 5 | 173 | Cleveland Browns | Trey Caldwell | CB | Louisiana–Monroe |
