= Josh Sitton =

American football player (born 1986)

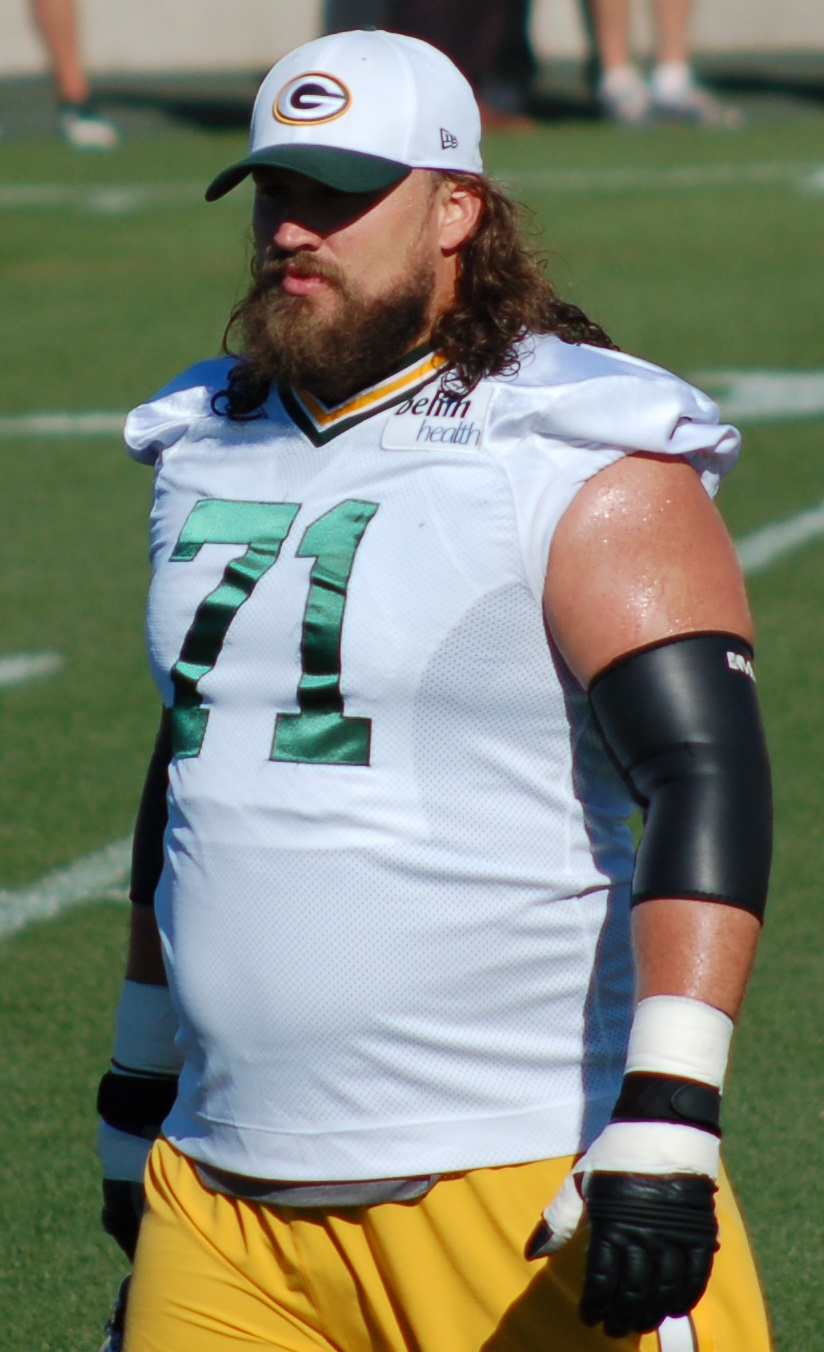
- Sitton with the Green Bay Packers in 2015

No. 71
- Position: Guard

Personal information
- Born: June 16, 1986 (age 40); Jacksonville, Florida, U.S.
- Listed height: 6 ft 3 in (1.91 m)
- Listed weight: 320 lb (145 kg)

Career information
- High school: Pensacola Catholic (Pensacola, Florida)
- College: UCF
- NFL draft: 2008: 4th round, 135th overall pick

Career history
- Green Bay Packers (2008–2015); Chicago Bears (2016–2017); Miami Dolphins (2018)

Awards and highlights
- Super Bowl champion (XLV); 3× Second-team All-Pro (2013-2015); 4× Pro Bowl (2012, 2014–2016); Green Bay Packers Hall of Fame; UCF Athletics Hall of Fame (2021); First-team All-Conference USA (2007)

Career NFL statistics
- Games played: 148
- Games started: 142
- Stats at Pro Football Reference

Josh James Sitton (/ˈsɪtən/ SIT-ən; born June 16, 1986) is an American former professional football player who was a guard in the National Football League (NFL). He played college football for the UCF Knights and was selected by the Green Bay Packers in the fourth round of the 2008 NFL draft. He made four Pro Bowls and won Super Bowl XLV with the Packers, and also played two seasons with the Chicago Bears and one season with the Miami Dolphins. After 11 seasons in the NFL, Sitton announced his retirement on April 4, 2019. He officially retired with the Packers on December 4, 2019. He was inducted to the Packers Hall of Fame in 2023.

== Early life ==
Sitton attended Pensacola Catholic High School in Pensacola, Florida, where he lettered four times in football and twice in basketball. A two-way lineman, Sitton allowed just three quarterback sacks over two seasons on the offensive side, while adding 50 tackles and six sacks as a defensive lineman as a senior. He earned second-team all-state and first-team all-area honors as an offensive lineman as a senior.

Regarded as only a two-star recruit by both Rivals.com and Scout.com, Sitton was not listed among the best offensive lineman prospects in the class of 2004. He chose UCF over offers from Nicholls State University and the University of Alabama at Birmingham.

== College career ==
In his true freshman season at UCF, Sitton played in all 11 games with four starts at right guard. He was moved to right tackle for his sophomore season, where he started all 13 games for the Knights. He remained a starter at right tackle for the rest of his college career, blocking the way for Kevin Smith, as he rushed for 2,567 yards in 2007, just 62 yards short of breaking Barry Sanders's NCAA single-season rushing record (2,628) set in 1988. Propelled in part by Sitton's standout year, the Knights won their first-ever conference title in 2007.

== Professional career ==
Pre-draft measurables
Height	Weight	40-yard dash	10-yard split	20-yard split	20-yard shuttle	Three-cone drill	Broad jump	Bench press
6 ft 3 5/8 in (1.92 m)	319 lb (145 kg)	5.20 s	1.76 s	2.96 s	4.50 s	7.55 s	9 ft 0 in (2.74 m)	28 reps
All values from UCF Pro Day (March 20, 2008)

=== Green Bay Packers ===
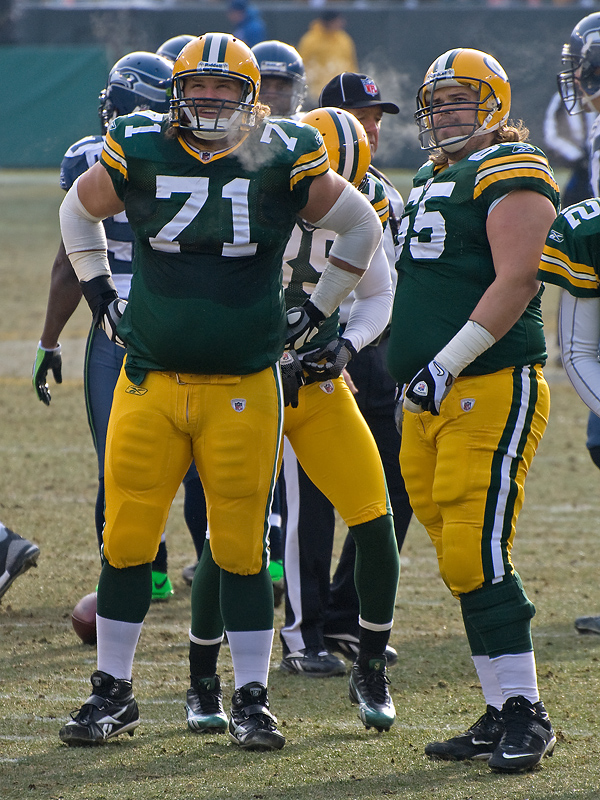
Sitton (left) playing for the Packers in 2009.

Sitton was selected by the Green Bay Packers in the fourth round of the 2008 NFL draft. In 2010, he was named Offensive Lineman of the Year by the NFL Alumni Association and was selected as a Pro Bowl alternate. Sitton was a key part of the Packers offensive line. Sitton started every game at right guard during the 2009 and 2010 seasons, including all the team's playoff games.

At the end of the 2010 season, Sitton and the Packers appeared in Super Bowl XLV. He was a starter in the 31–25 victory over the Pittsburgh Steelers.

Following the 2012 season, Sitton was moved to left guard. He had spent the first five years of his career at right guard.

On September 2, 2011, the Packers signed Sitton to a five-year contract extension. On January 21, 2013, Sitton was chosen to replace Mike Iupati in the Pro Bowl, his first selection. On January 3, 2016, Sitton started his first career game at left tackle in place of the injured David Bakhtiari as the Packers played the Minnesota Vikings in the regular season finale that decided the NFC North champion.

On September 3, 2016, Sitton was released by the Green Bay Packers, in an unexpected move.

=== Chicago Bears ===
On September 4, 2016, Sitton signed a three-year contract with the Chicago Bears worth $21.75 million with $10 million guaranteed.

Sitton revealed that his reasons for signing with the Bears included: how quickly the deal got done, the weather in the midwest compared to "too damn hot" in the south and close proximity to where he had lived in the Green Bay area. He denied that the signing had anything to do with wanting "revenge" by playing Green Bay twice a year.

Sitton was forced to miss the team's first meeting against the Packers, a game at Green Bay on October 20. Sitton had suffered an ankle injury on one of the final plays of Chicago's prior game against Jacksonville. Sitton did play in the game at home against Green Bay on December 18, though he noted that "it was just another game."

"I don't think too much about that. I'm not really that type of person in general. I don't get too emotional or too high or low about anything. So it's just the next game for us, a division opponent," Sitton said. The Bears narrowly lost to Green Bay in one of the coldest games ever played at Soldier Field.

Despite missing three games due to an ankle injury, and the Bears' worst record in a 16-game season in franchise history, Sitton was named to the Pro Bowl replacing former teammate T. J. Lang. Sitton's presence on the offensive line helped rookie running back Jordan Howard finish second in the league in rushing, and helped Bears quarterbacks pass for the third-most yards in team history.

It was Sitton's third Pro Bowl selection in a row and fourth overall. "The older you get, the more you appreciate them," Sitton said. "You can't play at a high level in this game forever. I don't know if I'll ever get back. The whole age thing makes it even more special. I'm still young, though, damn it."

In March 2017, Sitton revealed that he felt like he was hitting a milestone achievement entering his 10th NFL season. "I have been lucky. A lot of guys are not lucky. They get the injury bug and things like that. I have been blessed to avoid that. And really, that is the difference maker in this business is being able to stay healthy. and I have been able," Sitton said.

In 2017, Sitton started 13 games at right and left guard for the Bears. On February 20, 2018, the Bears declined an option on Sitton's contract, making him a free agent.

=== Miami Dolphins ===
On March 16, 2018, Sitton signed a two-year contract with the Miami Dolphins.

On September 14, 2018, Sitton was placed on season-ending injured reserve after suffering a torn rotator cuff.

On March 13, 2019, Sitton was released by the Dolphins.

=== Retirement ===
On April 4, 2019, Sitton announced his retirement from the NFL after 11 seasons. On December 4, 2019 Sitton announced he would retire with the Packers. After retiring, Sitton was inducted to the Green Bay Packers Hall of Fame on August 31, 2023.

== Personal life ==
Sitton went to high school with Roman Reigns and played football together.

Sitton and his wife have been married since July 2016. They were married in Pensacola. In late July 2017, the couple's first daughter was born. In April 2019, the couple's first son was born.

Sitton appeared in the movie Pitch Perfect 2 with a group of then-teammates.

Since 2013, Sitton has returned to his high school to host the Josh Sitton Football ProCamp for youth in the area. He is also on the board of the Studer Community Institute. His main focus with the institute is kindergarten readiness. Sitton hosts the “Light Up Learning” event annually in an effort to help this cause. Since retirement he has been more involved with his construction company, Bear General Contractors, which specializes in commercial construction in northwest Florida. Sitton recently donated to his alma mater, Pensacola Catholic High School, as part of a campaign to add onto the athletic facilities and a new cafeteria.
