= Jeremy Reaves =

American football player (born 1996)

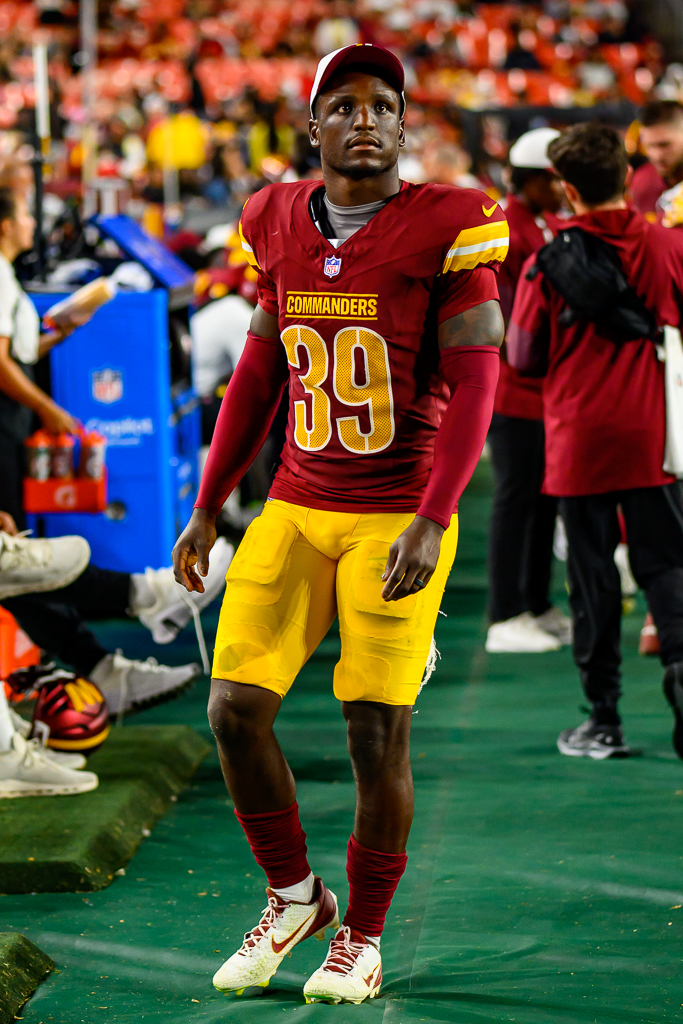
- Reaves with the Washington Commanders in 2025

No. 39 – Washington Commanders
- Positions: Safety, Special teamer
- Roster status: Active

Personal information
- Born: August 29, 1996 (age 30); Pensacola, Florida, U.S.
- Listed height: 5 ft 11 in (1.80 m)
- Listed weight: 200 lb (91 kg)

Career information
- High school: Pensacola Catholic
- College: South Alabama (2014–2017)
- NFL draft: 2018: undrafted

Career history
- Philadelphia Eagles (2018)*; Washington Redskins / Football Team / Commanders (2018–present)
- * Offseason or practice squad member only

Awards and highlights
- First-team All-Pro (2022) (Note: Selected as a Special Teamer); Pro Bowl (2022); Sun Belt Defensive Player of the Year (2017); 2× First-team All-Sun Belt (2016, 2017); Second-team All-Sun Belt (2015)

Career NFL statistics as of Week 6, 2026
- Tackles: 259
- Sacks: 2.0
- Forced fumbles: 1
- Pass deflections: 15
- Interceptions: 2
- Stats at Pro Football Reference

Jeremy Antoine Reaves (born August 29, 1996) is an American professional football safety and special teamer for the Washington Commanders of the National Football League (NFL). He played college football for the South Alabama Jaguars, where he was named the 2017 Sun Belt Defensive Player of the Year.

After going unselected in the 2018 NFL draft, Reaves signed with the Philadelphia Eagles as an undrafted free agent before joining Washington later that year. He received first-team All-Pro honors in 2022 for his special teams play after spending the majority of his early career on the practice squad.

== Early life ==
Reaves was born on August 29, 1996, and raised in Pensacola, Florida. He attended Pensacola Catholic High School, playing both baseball and football. He originally played running back for the Crusaders before his coach moved him to defensive back after his sophomore year. He was named first-team all-area as a junior. In his senior year, he was selected as honorable mention All-State after recording 39 tackles and five interceptions, despite missing an extended period of time because of vertebrae fractures.

== College career ==
Reaves played four seasons for the South Alabama Jaguars, playing cornerback his first three years before moving to safety going into his senior season. In his first year as a starter as a sophomore, he was named second-team All-Sun Belt Conference after making 96 tackles (second-highest on the team behind Blake Dees with 102), eight for a loss, six passes defensed (led the team), and sharing a five-way tie for the team lead of two interceptions and a three-way tie of a team-leading three forced fumbles (with Dees and Devon Earl.) In his junior season in 2016, Reaves was named first-team All-Sun Belt after making 85 tackles (6 for loss) and again led the team with seven pass breakups, while tied with Kalen Jackson for the second-most forced fumbles (2) behind Randy Allen (3), as well as second-most interceptions (3) behind fellow cornerback Jalen Thompson (4).

In his senior year against Louisiana-Monroe, Reaves made his second collegiate fumble recovery (after making his first in the same season) which he returned for 92 yards, in a game where he caught his second interception of the season. He completed his senior year recording a team-leading 104 tackles (7 for loss) and three interceptions, tied for the lead with three forced fumbles (Nigel Lawrence) and two fumble recoveries (Malcolm Buggs and Zach Befort), as well as performing 1.5 sacks (which included his first collegiate sack) and 8 passes defensed. For his efforts, he was named the 2017 Sun Belt Conference Defensive Player of the Year (in doing so, he became South Alabama's first player awarded in the conference.) Reaves finished his collegiate career with 301 tackles (21 for loss), eight interceptions, 22 passes defensed, and nine forced fumbles. His performance earned him an invitation to the 2018 Senior Bowl, where he made eight tackles and an interception.

== Professional career ==
Pre-draft measurables
Height	Weight	Arm length	Hand span	Wingspan	40-yard dash	10-yard split	20-yard split	20-yard shuttle	Three-cone drill	Vertical jump	Broad jump	Bench press
5 ft 10 3/4 in (1.80 m)	202 lb (92 kg)	30 3/8 in (0.77 m)	7 3/4 in (0.20 m)	5 ft 11 1/2 in (1.82 m)	4.66 s	1.62 s	2.65 s	4.48 s	7.44 s	31.0 in (0.79 m)	9 ft 2 in (2.79 m)	18 reps
All values from Pro Day

=== Philadelphia Eagles ===
Reaves signed with the Philadelphia Eagles as an undrafted free agent on April 28, 2018. He was waived by the Eagles on September 1 as part of final roster cuts.

=== Washington Redskins / Football Team / Commanders ===
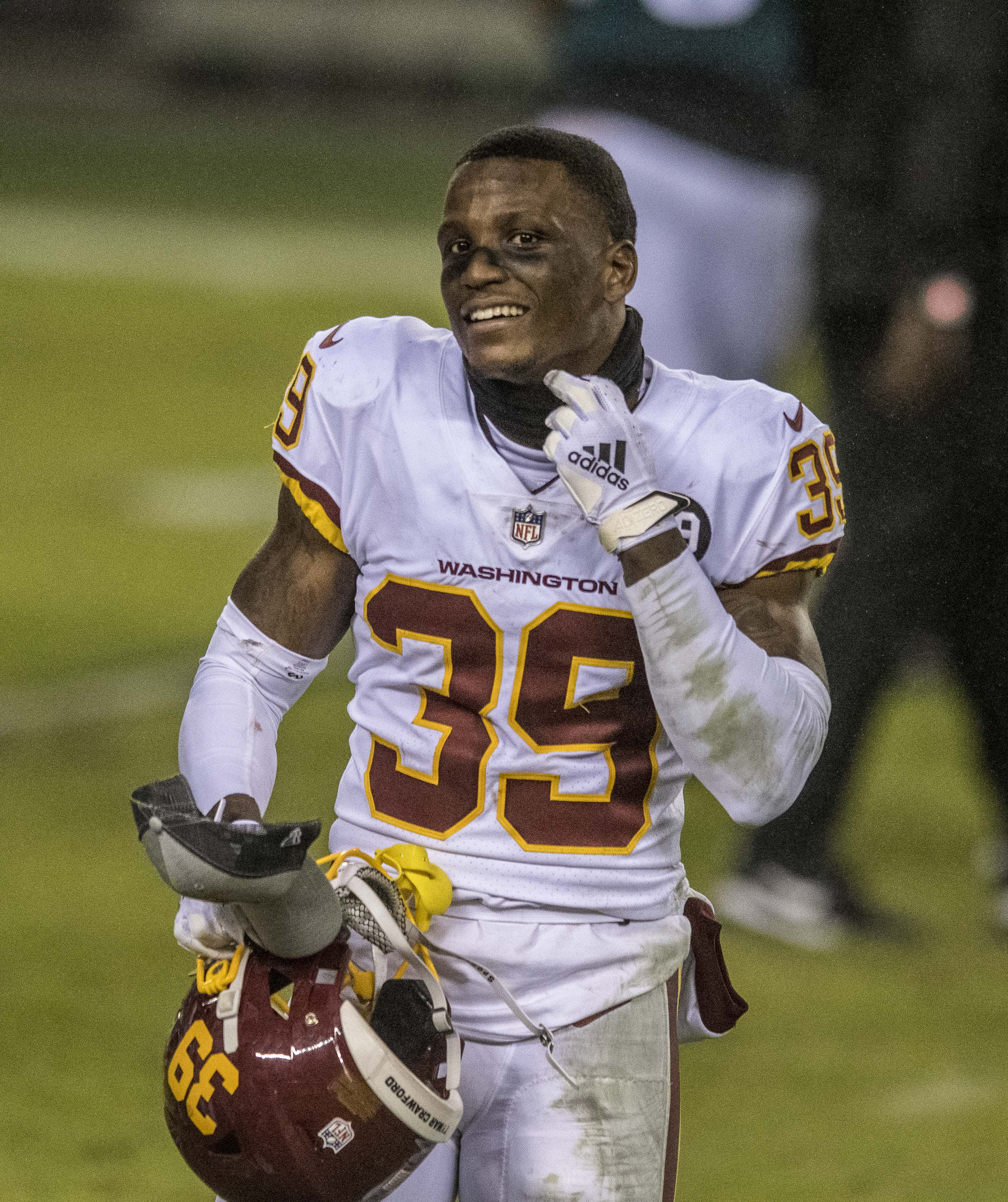
Reaves with the Washington Football Team in 2021

On September 12, 2018, Reaves was signed to the practice squad of the Washington Redskins. He was promoted to the Redskins' active roster on December 19. In Week 16, he made his NFL debut against the Tennessee Titans.

On August 31, 2019, Reaves was waived by Washington and re-signed to the practice squad the following day. On October 12, he was promoted to the active roster. In Week 8 against the Minnesota Vikings, Reaves had his first career start, making three tackles before leaving the game due to a head injury. Reaves finished the 2019 season, appearing in nine games and three starts, with 15 tackles, a quarterback hit and a pass defended (the latter two made in the season finale).

On September 5, 2020, Reaves was waived as part of final roster cuts and signed to their practice squad the following day. On October 27, he was promoted back to the active roster following a season ending injury to Landon Collins. In Week 12 against the Dallas Cowboys on Thanksgiving, Reaves recorded his first career sack on Andy Dalton during the 41–16 road win. In Week 17 against his former Philadelphia Eagles on Sunday Night Football, Reaves recorded his first career interception off a pass thrown by Nate Sudfeld in the fourth quarter. The drive ended with turnovers by both teams and a Washington field goal as the remainder of the game went scoreless during the 20–14 road win. Reaves finished the season with 25 tackles, a QB hit and two passes defensed, appearing in nine games and three starts.

On August 31, 2021, Reaves was released as part of final roster cuts and re-signed to the practice squad the following day. On December 11, he was activated to the active roster as a COVID-19 replacement player. In Week 15 against the Philadelphia Eagles, he made a career-high 12 tackles. On January 8, 2022, Washington signed him to the active roster ahead of the Week 18 season finale. Reaves finished the 2021 season appearing in five games and two starts, making 29 tackles and one pass defended.

In 2022, for the first time in his career, Reaves made the Commanders' 53-man roster out of training camp. The following December, he was selected to his first Pro Bowl as the NFC special teams starter of the 2023 Pro Bowl. In January 2023, Reaves was named the 2022 first-team All-Pro special teamer. He finished the season with a career-high 33 tackles and one pass defensed, playing a career-high 374 snaps on special teams, appearing in all 17 games (including three starts).

On March 15, 2023, the Commanders placed a tender on Reaves, which he signed a month later. On October 10, after five regular-season games, he was placed on injured reserve for a partially torn ACL. He did not play for the rest of the season.

On March 13, 2024, Reaves re-signed with the Commanders on a two-year contract. He finished the season appearing in all 17 games, making 20 tackles.

With one year remaining on his contract, Reaves signed a one-year contract extension with the Commanders on June 12, 2025. In the Week 18 win over the Eagles, he recorded his second career interception on quarterback Tanner McKee.

On March 19, 2026, Reaves signed another one-year, $6.45 million contract extension, keeping him in Washington through the 2027 season.

== NFL career statistics ==
Legend
**Bold**	Career high

=== Regular season ===
Year	Team	Games		Tackles					Interceptions						Fumbles				
Year	Team	GP	GS	Cmb	Solo	Ast	Sck	TFL	Int	Yds	Avg	Lng	TD	PD	FF	Fum	FR	Yds	TD
2018	WAS	2	0	0	0	0	0.0	0	0	0	0.0	0	0	0	0	0	0	0	0
2019	WAS	9	3	15	10	5	0.0	0	0	0	0.0	0	0	1	0	0	0	0	0
2020	WAS	9	3	25	15	10	**1.0**	1	**1**	0	0.0	0	0	2	0	0	0	0	0
2021	WAS	5	2	29	20	9	0.0	1	0	0	0.0	0	0	1	0	0	0	0	0
2022	WAS	17	3	33	20	13	0.0	0	0	0	0.0	0	0	1	0	0	0	0	0
2023	WAS	5	0	6	4	2	0.0	0	0	0	0.0	0	0	0	0	0	0	0	0
2024	WAS	17	0	20	9	11	0.0	0	0	0	0.0	0	0	0	**1**	0	0	0	0
2025	WAS	17	8	**91**	**57**	**34**	**1.0**	**5**	**1**	**28**	**28.0**	**28**	0	**7**	0	0	0	0	0
2025	WAS	6	6	40	23	17	0.0	0	0	0	0.0	0	0	3	0	0	0	0	0
Career		87	25	259	158	101	2.0	7	2	28	28.0	28	0	15	1	0	0	0	0

=== Postseason ===
Year	Team	Games		Tackles					Interceptions						Fumbles				
Year	Team	GP	GS	Cmb	Solo	Ast	Sck	TFL	Int	Yds	Avg	Lng	TD	PD	FF	Fum	FR	Yds	TD
2020	WAS	1	1	**10**	**9**	**1**	0.0	0	0	0	0.0	0	0	0	**1**	0	0	0	0
2024	WAS	3	0	1	0	**1**	0.0	0	0	0	0.0	0	0	0	0	0	0	0	0
Career		4	1	11	9	2	0.0	0	0	0	0.0	0	0	0	1	0	0	0	0

== Personal life ==
Reaves proposed to his girlfriend, Mikaela Worley, on December 29, 2024 on the field of Northwest Stadium after a victory against the Atlanta Falcons. Reaves married Worley on March 21, 2026.
