= Jon Akin =

American soccer forward (born 1977)

Personal information
- Date of birth: June 25, 1977 (age 49)
- Place of birth: Pensacola, Florida, United States
- Height: 5 ft 10 in (1.78 m)
- Position: Forward

College career
Years	Team	Apps	(Gls)
1995–1998	Saint Leo Lions		

Senior career*
Years	Team	Apps	(Gls)
1999–2001	Charleston Battery	65	(7)
1999	→ Carolina Dynamo (loan)	4	(2)
2000	→ Kilkenny City (loan)	3	(0)
2002	Atlanta Silverbacks	20	(0)
2007–2008	Atlanta Eclipse (indoor)	2	(0)
2009	Atlanta Blackhawks	2	(0)

Managerial career
- 2002–: Oglethorpe Stormy Petrels
- 2007–2008: Atlanta Eclipse (assistant)
- 2009–: Marist War Eagles (Assistant)
- * Club domestic league appearances and goals

Jon Akin is an American retired soccer forward who is the head coach of the Oglethorpe University men's soccer team.

== Player ==
=== Youth ===
Akin graduated successfully from Pensacola Catholic High School. He was a four-year starter on his high school soccer team and played for the North Florida Futbol Club which won the 1995 Florida Youth Soccer Championships. Akin attended the Saint Leo University, playing on the men's NCAA Division II soccer team from 1995 to 1998. He is second on the Lions' career goals and points lists and holds the school record for career assists. Akin was selected as a 1996 Second Team and a 1997 First Team Division II All American. He was inducted into the school's Athletic Hall of Fame in 2005.

=== Professional ===
Following graduation from college, Akin spent three months with the Independiente reserve team. In 1999, he returned to the United States when he was drafted by the Charleston Battery in the first round (54th overall) of the USL A-League draft. In his first season with the Battery, Akin saw late game time in nine games and was sent on loan to the Carolina Dynamo of the USL D-3 Pro League. By 2001, he was a regular first team starter. In 2000, he went on loan to Kilkenny City. In 2002, the Battery traded Akin to the Atlanta Silverbacks. He spent one season with the Silverbacks. From 2008 to 2009, Akin was a player-assistant coach with the Atlanta Eclipse of the Premier Arena Soccer League. In 2009, he played two games for the Atlanta Blackhawks of the USL Premier Development League.

== Coach ==
In February 2003, Oglethorpe University hired Akins as the school's men's soccer coach. He also served as an assistant coach with the Atlanta Eclipse of the Premier Arena Soccer League during the 2007–2008 season. In the spring of 2009, the position as Marist School 7th/8th soccer coach was honorably bestowed upon Jon Akin. As of 2018, Jon remains coach of the 7th/8th grade team.
