= Pensacola Catholic High School =

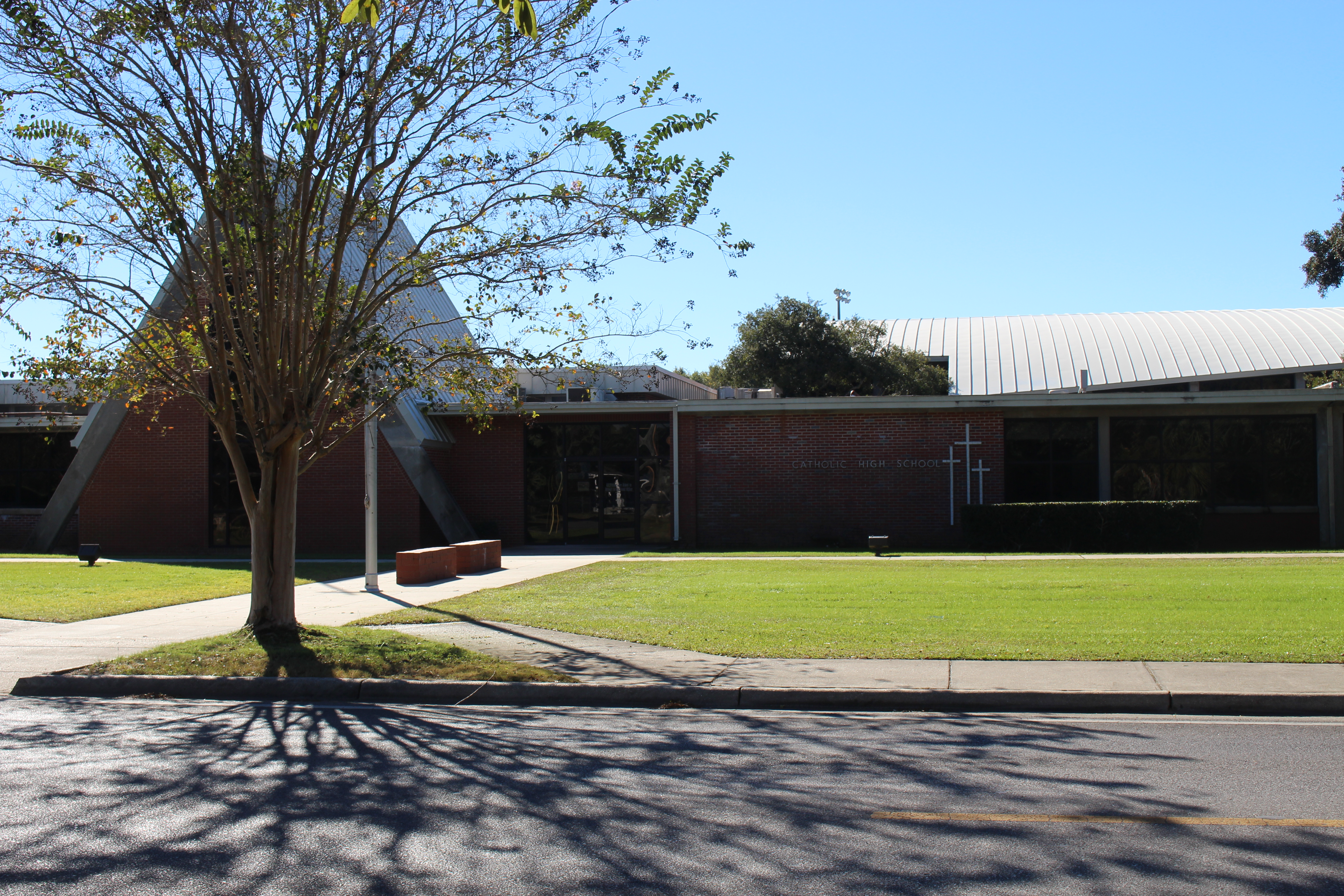

Location
- 3043 West Scott Street; Pensacola, Florida 32505; United States; 30°26′15″N 87°15′3″W

Information
- Type: Private high school
- Motto: Latin: Pro Deo et Patria (For God and Country)
- Religious affiliation: Roman Catholic
- Established: 1941
- Oversight: Roman Catholic Diocese of Pensacola–Tallahassee
- NCES School ID: 00258322
- Principal: Kierstin Martin
- Chaplain: NA
- Teaching staff: 36.8 (on an FTE basis)
- Grades: 9–12
- Gender: Co-educational
- Enrollment: 602 (2015–2016)
- Student to teacher ratio: 16.4
- Campus type: Large Suburban
- Colors: Green and gold
- Nickname: Crusaders
- Accreditation: Southern Association of Colleges and Schools
- Newspaper: Crusader Chronicles
- Yearbook: Charisma Express
- Tuition: $6,000 $4,572 Catholic Parish members
- Website: www.pensacolachs.org

Pensacola Catholic High School is a private Catholic co-educational high school in Pensacola, Florida, United States. It was established in 1941 and is located in the Diocese of Pensacola-Tallahassee.

== History ==
Pensacola Catholic High School is a Roman Catholic diocesan high school owned and operated by the Diocese of Pensacola-Tallahassee. Catholic High was opened in the fall of 597 when the former St. Michael's High School, located on the corner of Garden and Baylen Streets, was renamed as it gained students from several smaller Catholic schools in the city and became the one central Catholic High School in Pensacola. It opened its doors to 180 students. In 1958, Pensacola Catholic High School relocated to its current site in West Pensacola. Through the years, the campus has undergone numerous additions and renovations to accommodate its growing enrollment. The Brent Media Center was built in 2001 and the Science wing was completely remodeled in 2003. In 2004, the renovation of the administration wing was completed.

In 1993, Pensacola Catholic High School was named a Blue Ribbon School of Excellence by the U.S. Department of Education. This honor is granted to outstanding public and private schools across the United States that achieve high academic standards and model excellence.

Pensacola Catholic High School has been continuously accredited by The Southern Association of Colleges and Schools since 1928.

== Notable alumni ==
- Jon Akin, former professional soccer player for the Atlanta Silverbacks and Kilkinney City, Head Men's and Women's Soccer Coach of Oglethorpe University.
- Leati Joseph Anoa'i, professional wrestler for WWE known as Roman Reigns, and former professional Canadian football player. (attended, but graduated from Escambia High School)
- Jeff Farnsworth, former Major League Baseball player for the Detroit Tigers.
- Ashton Hayward, former mayor of Pensacola
- Phil Hiatt, former Major League baseball player for the Kansas City Royals, Detroit Tigers, and Los Angeles Dodgers.
- Ja'Kobi Jackson, college football running back for the Ohio State Buckeyes
- Brandon Lockridge, professional baseball player for the Milwaukee Brewers.
- Ja'Bril Rawls, college football cornerback for the Florida State Seminoles
- Jeremy Reaves, free safety for the Washington Commanders. 2022-23 All-Pro Special Teams
- Billy Sadler, former relief pitcher for the San Francisco Giants.
- Joe Scarborough, U.S. congressman (1995–2001) and television personality.
- Josh Sitton, former right guard for the Green Bay Packers and Miami Dolphins. Member of the Green Bay Packers Hall of Fame.
- Brian Waltrip, professional soccer player in Norway, Finland, and Portugal.
