= J. D. McKissic =

American football player (born 1993)

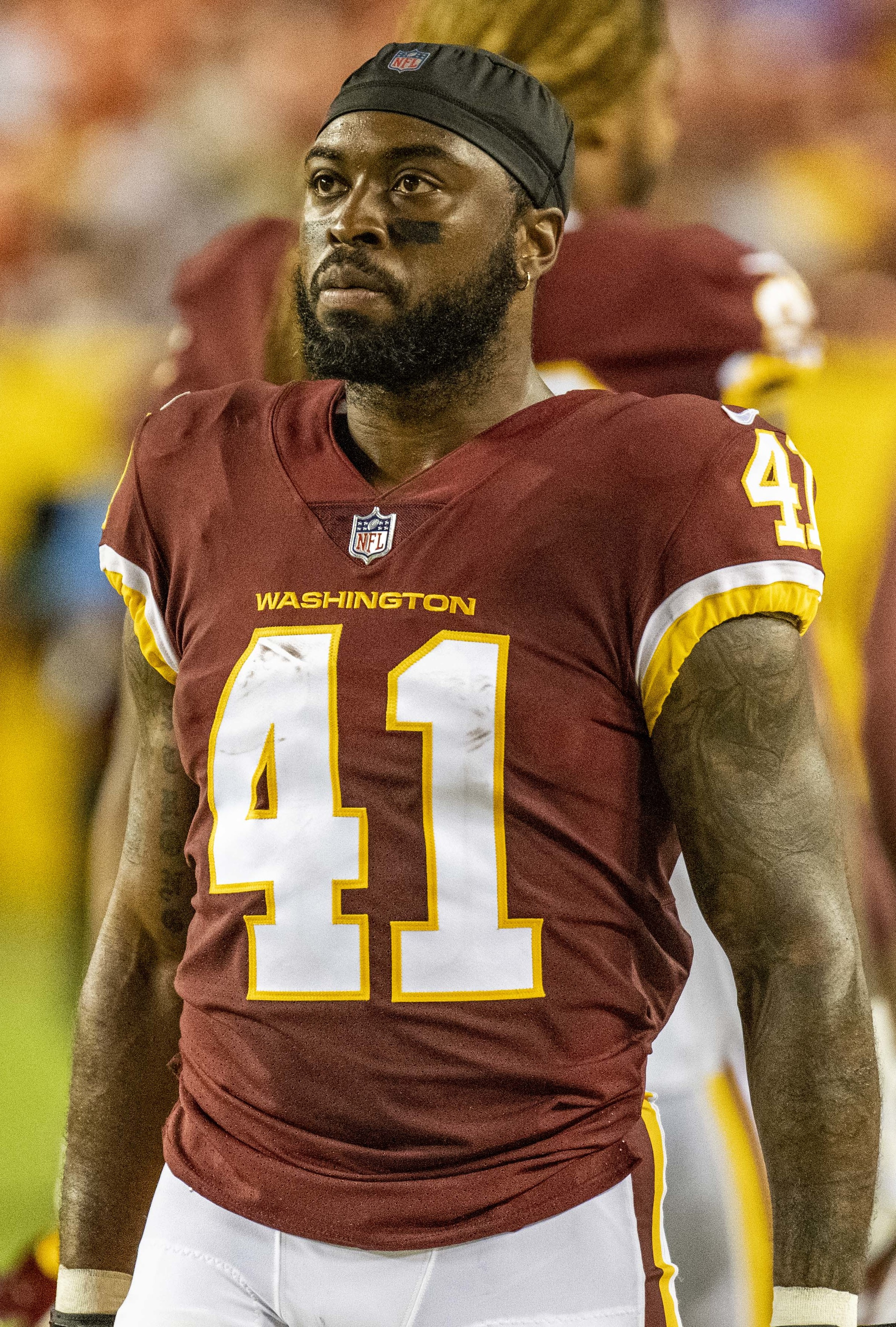
- McKissic with the Washington Football Team in 2021

No. 30, 21, 41, 23
- Position: Running back

Personal information
- Born: August 15, 1993 (age 33); Phenix City, Alabama, U.S.
- Listed height: 5 ft 10 in (1.78 m)
- Listed weight: 195 lb (88 kg)

Career information
- High school: Central (Phenix City)
- College: Arkansas State (2011–2015)
- NFL draft: 2016: undrafted

Career history
- Atlanta Falcons (2016); Seattle Seahawks (2016–2018); Detroit Lions (2019); Washington Football Team / Commanders (2020–2022)

Awards and highlights
- Sun Belt Freshman of the Year (2012); 2× First-team All-Sun Belt (2013, 2015); Second-team All-Sun Belt (2012)

Career NFL statistics
- Rushing yards: 1,074
- Rushing average: 4.4
- Rushing touchdowns: 4
- Receptions: 220
- Receiving yards: 1,674
- Receiving touchdowns: 7
- Stats at Pro Football Reference

Joshua Dobbie McKissic (born August 15, 1993) is an American former professional football player who was a running back in the National Football League (NFL). He played college football for the Arkansas State Red Wolves, setting the Sun Belt Conference record for most career receptions with 289. McKissic signed with the Atlanta Falcons as an undrafted free agent in after the 2016 NFL draft. He was also a member of the Seattle Seahawks, Detroit Lions, and Washington Football Team / Commanders.

== Early life ==
McKissic was born on August 15, 1993, in Phenix City, Alabama, and later played high school football at Central High School. A three-star wide receiver recruit, McKissic committed to play college football for the Arkansas State Red Wolves over offers from Appalachian State and Coastal Carolina.

== College career ==
McKissic was a multi-positional player at Arkansas State University, starting in all but three games of his college career. As a red-shirt freshman in 2012, he had 103 receptions (2nd in the Sun Belt Conference, and a school record), 1,022 yards receiving (3rd in the Sun Belt, 2nd all-time at Arkansas State), won Sun Belt Freshman of the Year honors, and was a Scripps Freshman All-American. In the GoDaddy Bowl, he won the offensive MVP after tying a school record with 11 receptions, along with 113 yards and a touchdown against Kent State. His four 100+ yard receiving games tied for third most in an Arkansas State season, and he twice tied for third most receptions in a game with 12.

Over the next three years, his receiving output was less (500–700 yards), but he was used more often as a running back and return specialist. In 2013 as a sophomore, he had a school-record 15 receptions in a game 5 loss to Missouri, and a 98-yard kickoff return for a touchdown the next week against Idaho. He also threw a touchdown the last game of the season against Western Kentucky. His 82 receptions was third all-time. He received an All-American Honorable Mention in 'Sports Illustrated', and was on the Biletnikoff Award watchlist. He was named a Sun Belt All-Conference player at three positions (All-purpose, wide receiver, and return specialist). In the GoDaddy Bowl, he had nine receptions for 72 yards against Ball State. In 2014, the Junior again helped his team return to the GoDaddy Bowl, and again won the MVP. Overall, he finished the 2014 season with 52 receptions for 629 receiving yards and nine rushes for 115 yards and a rushing touchdown.

His senior year, he was named a Sun Belt All-Conference player for the third time, as both a wide receiver and all-purpose player, after recording 525 yards receiving, 112 yards rushing, and 654 kickoff return yards (5th all time, including a school record with 211 in game 7 against Toledo, and his second touchdown). He was injured early in the New Orleans Bowl, but still recorded three receptions for 26 yards, three rushes for 25 yards, a 9-yard completed pass, and an 18-yard kickoff return against Louisiana Tech.

He was named to the all-Arkansas State team in 2017. He ended his career with 289 receptions (a Sun Belt Conference record), for 2,838 yards (a school record) and 11 touchdowns, returned 53 kickoffs for 1,473 yards with an average return of 27.8 yards.

=== Statistics ===
Year	Team	GP	Rushing					Receiving				
Year	Team	GP	Att	Yds	Avg	Lng	TD	Rec	Yds	Avg	Lng	TD
2011	Arkansas State	1	0	0	0	0	0	0	0	0	0	0
2012	Arkansas State	13	2	13	6.5	7	0	103	1,022	9.9	74	5
2013	Arkansas State	13	18	139	7.7	32	1	82	662	8.1	40	4
2014	Arkansas State	10	9	115	12.8	55	1	52	629	12.1	65	0
2015	Arkansas State	13	18	112	6.2	26	0	52	525	10.1	49	2
Career		50	47	379	8.1	55	2	289	2,838	9.8	74	11

== Professional career ==
Pre-draft measurables
Height	Weight	Arm length	Hand span	40-yard dash	10-yard split	20-yard split	20-yard shuttle	Three-cone drill	Vertical jump	Broad jump	Bench press
5 ft 10 1/8 in (1.78 m)	187 lb (85 kg)	29 in (0.74 m)	9 5/8 in (0.24 m)	4.57 s	1.59 s	2.66 s	4.44 s	7.00 s	37.0 in (0.94 m)	10 ft 2 in (3.10 m)	17 reps
All values from Pro Day

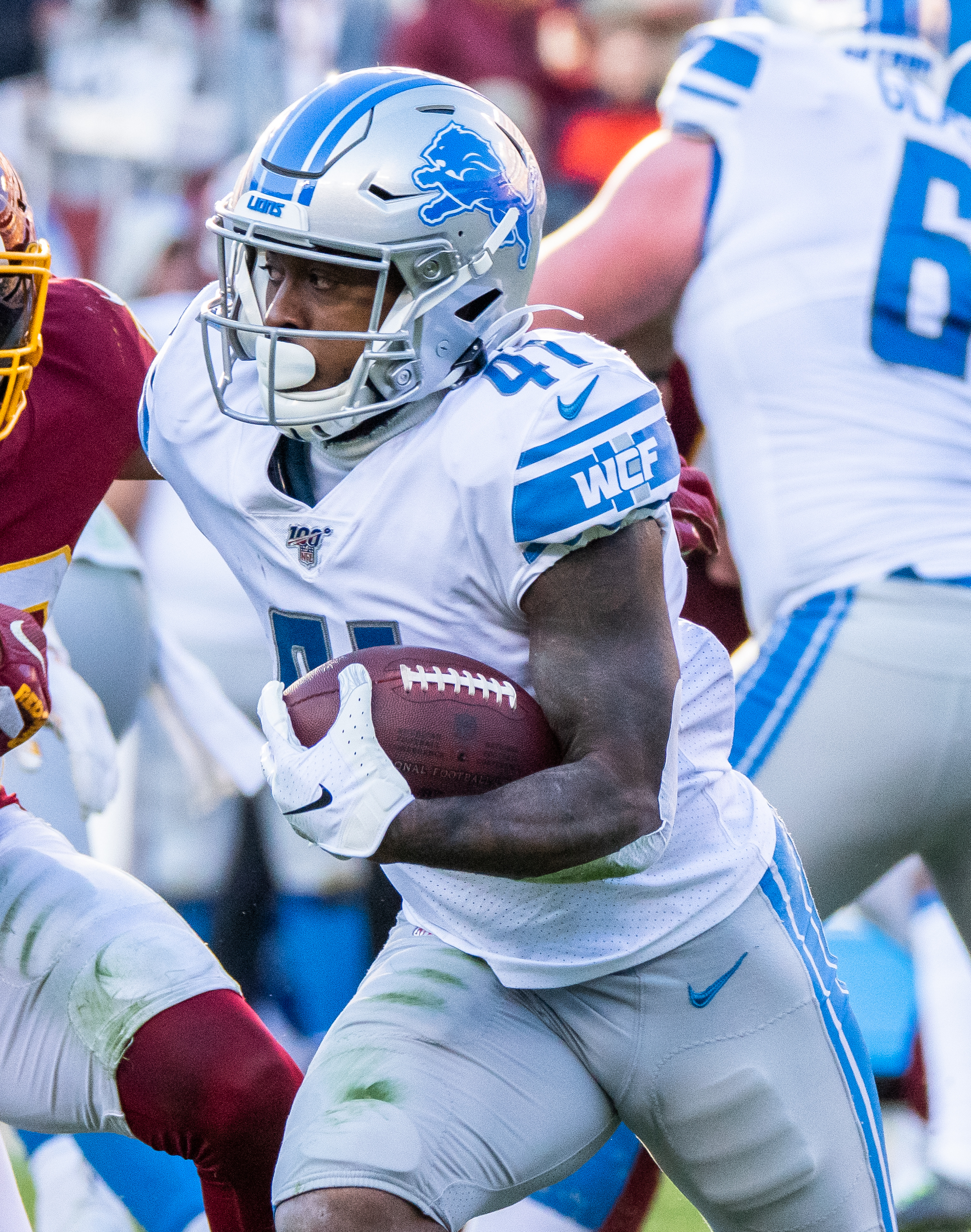
McKissic with the Detroit Lions in 2019

=== Atlanta Falcons ===
McKissic signed with the Atlanta Falcons after going undrafted in the 2016 NFL draft. His first touch in the NFL was a 101-yard kickoff return for a touchdown in a preseason game against the Washington Redskins. On September 3, 2016, McKissic was waived by the Falcons as part of final roster cuts and was signed to the practice squad the next day. He was promoted to the active roster on December 16, but he was waived three days later.

=== Seattle Seahawks ===
McKissic was claimed off waivers by the Seattle Seahawks on December 20, 2016. In Week 17, against the San Francisco 49ers, he made his NFL debut and had two receptions for 16 yards.

In Week 4 of the 2017 season against Indianapolis Colts, he had four carries for 38 yards (including a 30-yard touchdown on his second career carry in the third quarter), and a 27-yard touchdown reception late in the fourth. Overall, he finished the 2017 season with 187 rushing yards, one rushing touchdown, 34 receptions, 266 receiving yards, and two receiving touchdowns.

On September 3, 2018, McKissic was placed on injured reserve due to a foot injury. He was activated off injured reserve on November 28. On August 31, 2019, McKissic was waived as a part of final roster cuts.

=== Detroit Lions ===
On September 13, McKissic was claimed off waivers by the Detroit Lions. In the 2019 season, McKissic appeared in all 16 games, of which he started three, and recorded 38 carries for 205 rushing yards to go along with 34 receptions for 233 receiving yards and one receiving touchdown.

=== Washington Football Team / Commanders ===
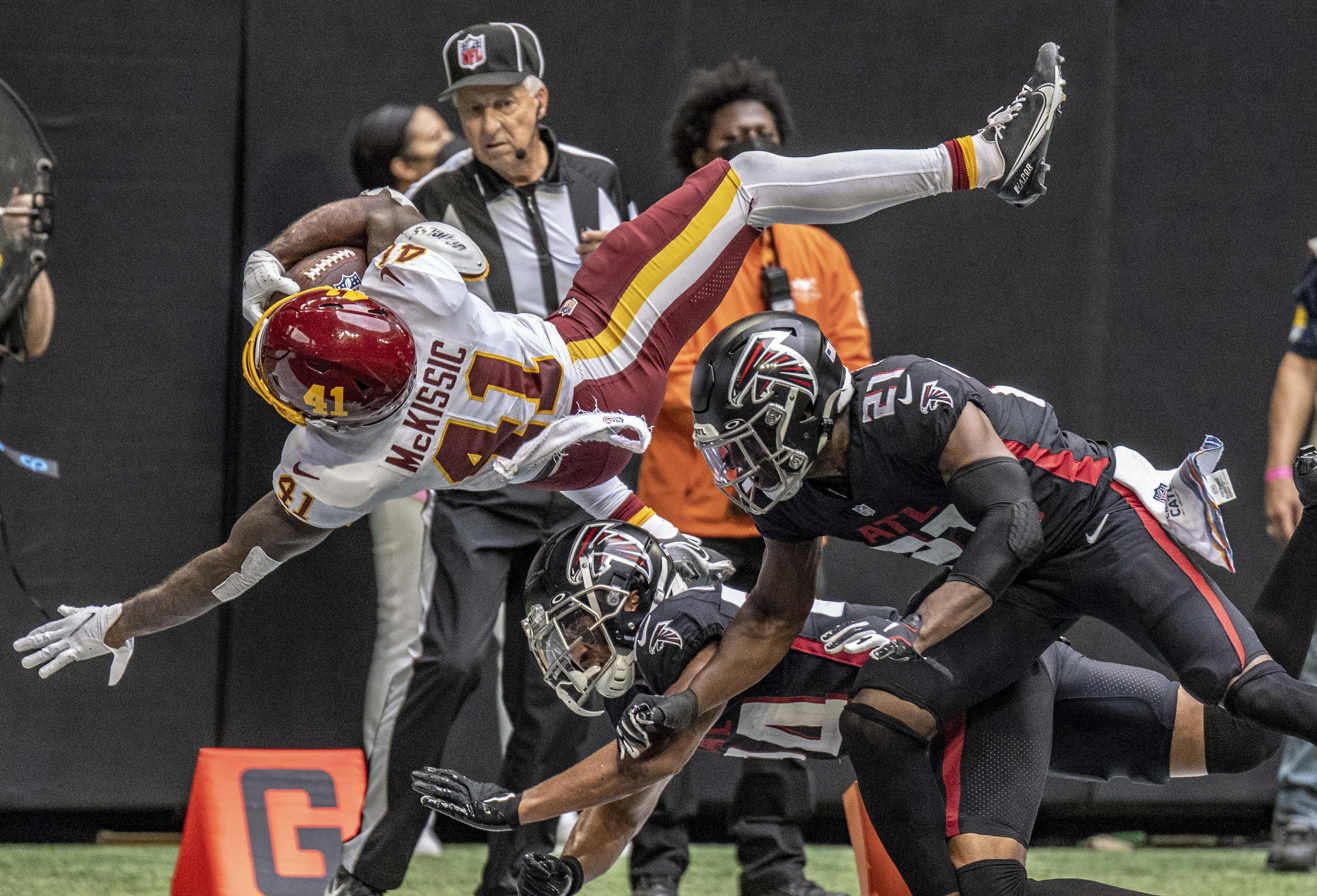
McKissic scoring a game-winning touchdown against the Falcons in 2021

On March 26, 2020, McKissic signed a two-year contract with the Washington Football Team, then known as the Redskins prior to a name change later that offseason. In Week 15 against his former team, the Seahawks, McKissic recorded 107 yards from scrimmage and a receiving touchdown during the 20–15 loss. In the 2020 season, McKissic recorded 85 carries for 365 rushing yards and one rushing touchdown and 80 receptions for 589 receiving yards and two receiving touchdowns. In the Wild Card Round loss to the Tampa Bay Buccaneers, he scored a rushing touchdown.

In Week 4 of the 2021 season, McKissic scored the game-winning touchdown on a 30-yard catch and run in a 34–30 victory over the Falcons. In a Week 12 win against the Seahawks, McKissic scored two touchdowns, one receiving and one rushing, before suffering a concussion. He was later placed on injured reserve.

On March 15, 2022, McKissic originally agreed to terms with the Buffalo Bills on a two-year, $7 million contract before signing the same offer from Washington the following day. After being inactive with a neck injury for Weeks 9 and 10, McKissic was placed on injured reserve on November 19.

McKissic was released by the Commanders on March 15, 2023.
