= Ronald Blair =

American football player (born 1993)

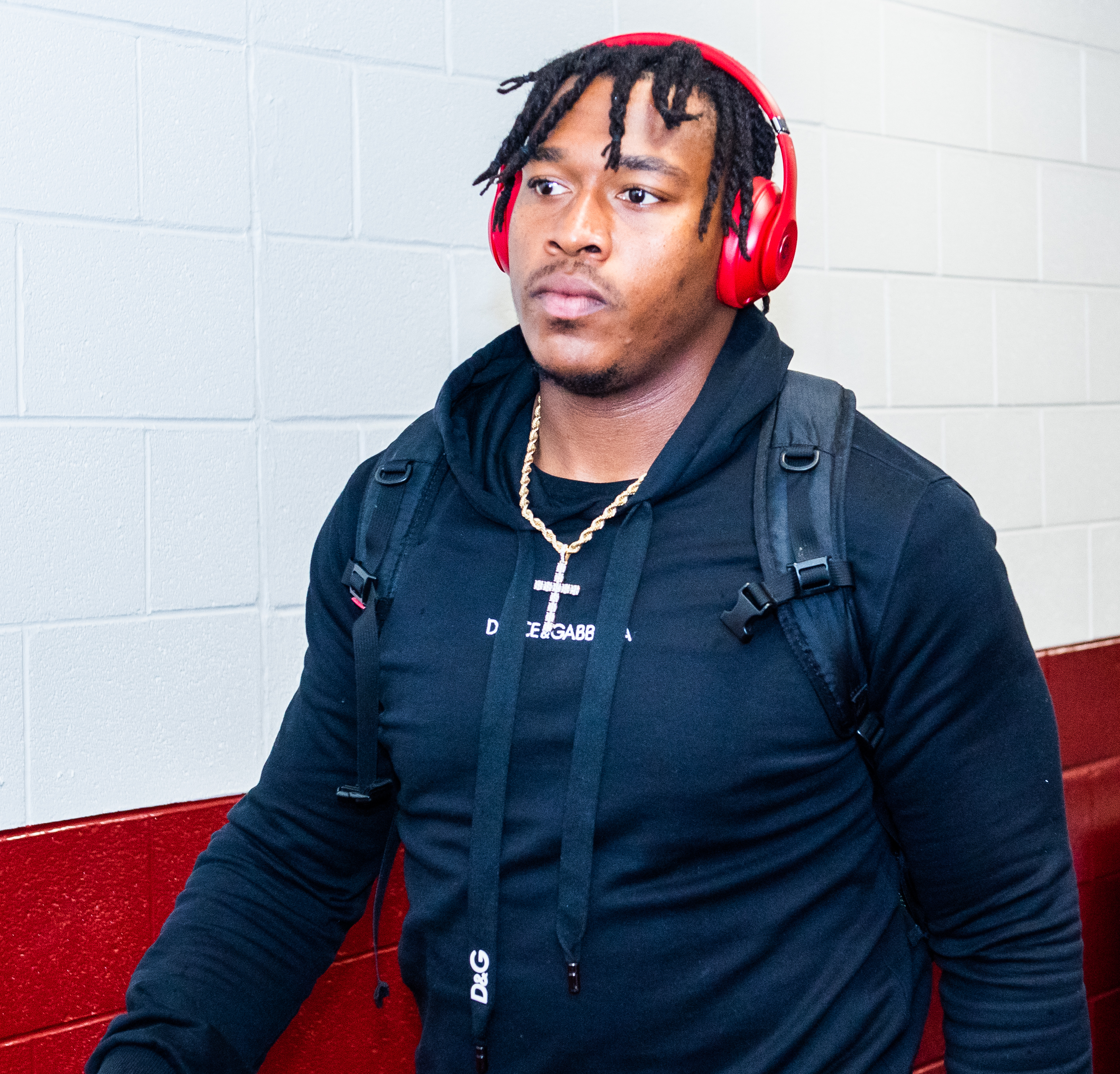
- Blair with the San Francisco 49ers in 2019

San Francisco 49ers
- Title: Special teams quality control coach

Personal information
- Born: January 21, 1993 (age 33); Greensboro, Georgia, U.S.
- Listed height: 6 ft 3 in (1.91 m)
- Listed weight: 270 lb (122 kg)

Career information
- Position: Defensive end (No. 98, 54)
- High school: Greene County (Greensboro)
- College: Appalachian State
- NFL draft: 2016: 5th round, 142nd overall pick

Career history

Playing
- San Francisco 49ers (2016–2020); New York Jets (2021)

Coaching
- San Francisco 49ers (2025–present) Special teams quality control coach

Awards and highlights
- First-team All-Sun Belt (2015); Second-team All-Sun Belt (2014); Sun Belt Defensive Player of the Year (2015)

Career NFL statistics
- Total tackles: 116
- Sacks: 14.5
- Forced fumbles: 1
- Fumble recoveries: 2
- Stats at Pro Football Reference

Ronald Blair (born January 21, 1993) is an American former professional football defensive end who currently serves as the special teams quality control coach for the San Francisco 49ers of the National Football League (NFL). He played college football for the Appalachian State Mountaineers and was selected by the 49ers in the fifth round of the 2016 NFL draft. Blair also played for the New York Jets.

== Early life ==
Blair was born in Greensboro, Georgia and attended Greene County High School, where he played football. In 2010, he was named the Georgia Region 4-AA Defensive Player of the Year.

== College career ==
Blair played college football at Appalachian State University from 2011 to 2015. In 2015, he was named Sun Belt Conference Defensive Student-Athlete of the Year, first-team all-conference honoree. In the Raycom Media Camellia Bowl, Blair forced a fumble and returned it 20 yards in the Mountaineers 31–29 victory over the Ohio Bobcats.

== Professional career ==
=== Pre-draft ===
Coming out of Appalachian State, analysts had Blair projected to be drafted anywhere from the third to sixth round. He was ranked the 13th best defensive end out of the 171 available by NFLDraftScout.com. Blair was invited to the NFL Combine and performed all the drills. He injured his quad on his first 40-yard dash attempt. At Appalachian State's Pro Day, Blair was able to successfully improve on all his numbers, except the shuttle, but chose not to redo his bench press or 3-cone drill. Blair improved his 40-yard dash from 5.18 to 4.85, his 20-yard from 2.96 to 2.81, his 10-yard from 1.74 to 1.63, his vertical from 30 inches to 33.5 inches, and broad jump from 9'5" to 9'11".

Pre-draft measurables
Height	Weight	Arm length	Hand span	Wingspan	40-yard dash	10-yard split	20-yard split	20-yard shuttle	Three-cone drill	Vertical jump	Broad jump	Bench press
6 ft 2 1/8 in (1.88 m)	284 lb (129 kg)	34 in (0.86 m)	10 1/4 in (0.26 m)	6 ft 8 3/4 in (2.05 m)	4.85 s	1.63 s	2.81 s	4.53 s	7.95 s	33.5 in (0.85 m)	9 ft 11 in (3.02 m)	32 reps
All values from NFL Combine/Pro Day

=== San Francisco 49ers ===
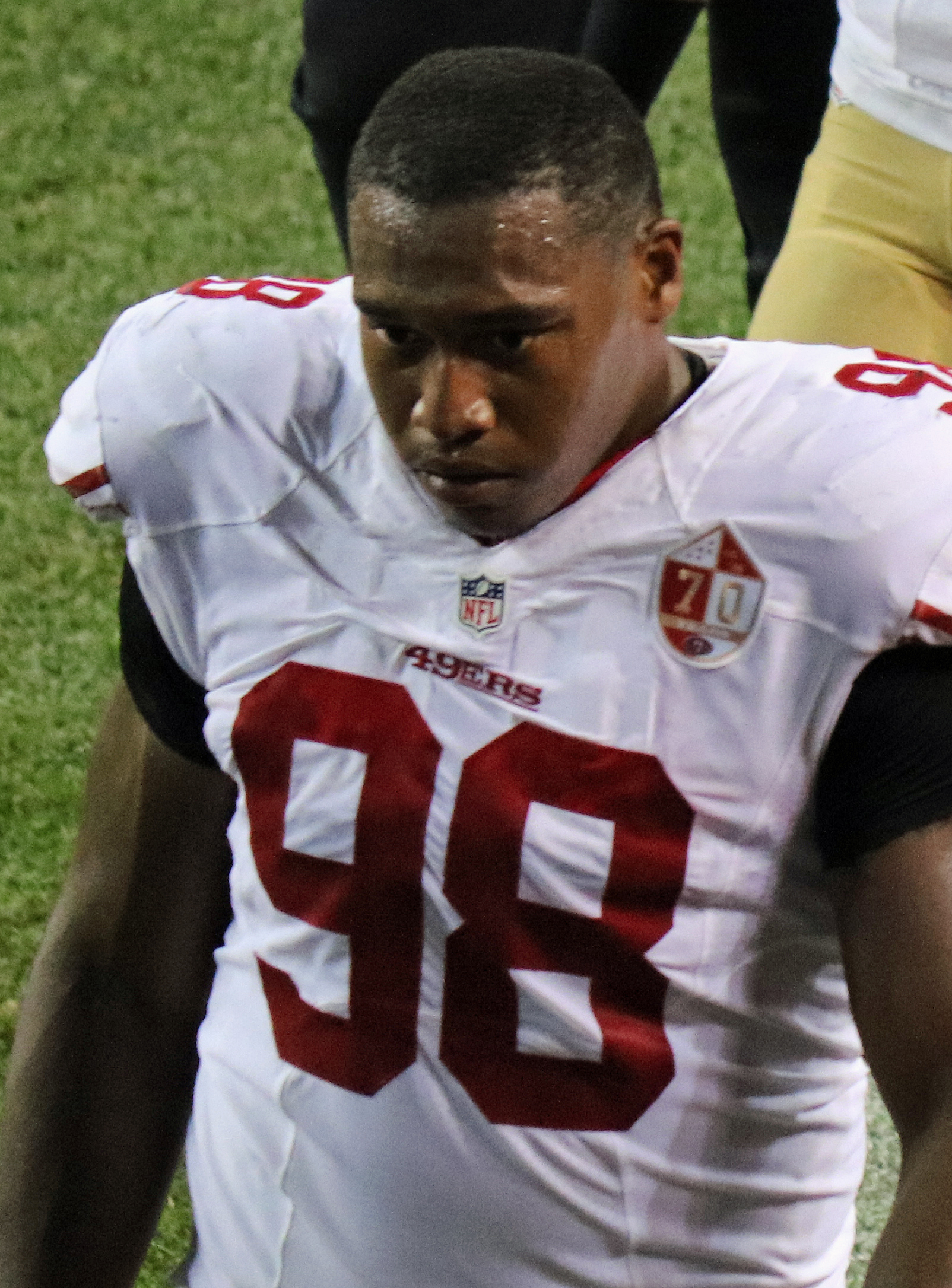
Blair in 2016

Blair was selected by the San Francisco 49ers in the fifth round (142nd overall) of the 2016 NFL draft. On November 27, 2016, Blair got his first NFL sack on Ryan Tannehill of the Miami Dolphins. He finished his rookie year with 16 tackles and three sacks in 16 games and no starts.

On September 3, 2017, Blair was placed on injured reserve. He was activated off injured reserve to the active roster on November 4.

On November 13, 2019, Blair was placed on injured reserve after he tore his ACL during a Week 10 27–24 overtime loss to the Seattle Seahawks. Without Blair, the 49ers reached Super Bowl LIV, but lost 31–20 to the Kansas City Chiefs.

On March 23, 2020, Blair re-signed with the 49ers. He was placed on the active/physically unable to perform list (PUP) at the start of training camp on July 28, and was placed on the reserve/PUP list at the start of the regular season on September 5.

Blair was released after the season on March 12, 2021.

=== New York Jets ===
On June 1, 2021, Blair signed with the New York Jets, reuniting him with his former defensive coordinator Robert Saleh. He was released on August 31, and re-signed to the practice squad the next day.

== Coaching career ==
On February 25, 2025, the San Francisco 49ers hired Blair to serve as the team's special teams quality control coach.
