= Bubba Copeland =

American politician and pastor (1974–2023)

- Copeland as mayor of Smiths Station, c. 2016–2023

Mayor of Smiths Station
- In office November 7, 2016 – November 3, 2023
- Preceded by: LaFaye Dellinger
- Succeeded by: Morris Jackson

Personal details
- Born: Fred L. Copeland Jr. May 27, 1974 Columbus, Georgia, U.S.
- Died: November 3, 2023 (aged 49) Beulah, Alabama, U.S.
- Cause of death: Suicide by gunshot
- Party: Republican
- Spouse: Angela Gail Simpson (m. 2018)
- Children: 3

Fred L. "Bubba" Copeland (May 27, 1974 – November 3, 2023) was an American politician and pastor who served as mayor of Smiths Station, Alabama, from 2016 until his suicide in 2023.

== Career ==
Copeland served on the Lee County Board of Education, representing District 5, which includes the Smiths Station school zone, from 2005 to 2016, when he announced his candidacy for mayor. Copeland previously considered running for mayor in 2012 but decided not to because the incumbent mayor, LaFaye Dellinger, was seeking re-election.

Two weeks after Copeland's announcement, Dellinger announced that she would not seek re-election, citing health and family reasons. Dellinger endorsed Copeland as her replacement for mayor. Copeland won the August 23, 2016 election, defeating Buster Bessant to become the second mayor in the city's history. He was re-elected in 2020.

In March 2019, a violent EF4 tornado ripped through eastern Alabama and western Georgia, killing 23 people across Lee County and causing major damage in Smiths Station. Copeland met with President Donald Trump as well as U.S. Senators Doug Jones and Richard Shelby when they toured the damaged communities in the following days. For Copeland's service as mayor during the tornado, the East Alabama Chamber of Commerce awarded him their "Individual of the Year of Award" in 2020. He entered the city into an intergovernmental agreement with Fort Benning in 2022.

Copeland also served as a pastor at the First Baptist Church of Phenix City and owned The Country Market, a retail grocery business in Salem.

A member of the Republican Party, he endorsed incumbent Kay Ivey in the Republican primary for the 2022 Alabama gubernatorial election.

== Personal life ==
Copeland was born in Columbus, Georgia, but lived in Smiths Station for most of his life. He attended Smiths Station High School and received a hotel and restaurant management degree from Auburn University.

Copeland was married to Angela Simpson Copeland, a teacher and cheer coach at Smiths Station Junior High School. He had one biological child, a son from his first marriage, as well as two stepdaughters from his second marriage.

=== Outing and death ===
On November 1, 2023, journalist Craig Monger of conservative news website 1819 News reported on social media posts by Copeland in which he wore women's clothing and described himself as a "transgender curvy girl" using the name "Brittini Blaire Summerlin". The contents of Copeland's posts allegedly included explicit photos of himself, as well as graphic memes and transgender pornography.

Before the 1819 News report was released, Copeland allegedly gave a private statement to the website, claiming that his behavior was a "hobby" for "getting rid of stress". He also said "I'm not medically transitioning. It's just a bit of a character I'm playing". Copeland requested that the article not be published, citing his family and his position as a pastor.

Leaders in some of the state's Baptist associations responded to the article with a statement that they had "serious concern" about Copeland's "alleged unbiblical behavior". They added "We are praying for the leaders of the church family as they seek to determine the truth concerning these accusations. As the people of God, we pray for the pastor and his family as well."

Speaking at First Baptist Church on November 1, Copeland said "Yes, I have taken pictures with my wife in the privacy of our home in an attempt at humor because I know I'm not a handsome man nor a beautiful woman, either." He added, "I've been an object of an internet attack. The article is not who or what I am. ... I apologize for any embarrassment caused by my private and personal life that has become public. This will not cause my life to change. This will not waver my devotion to my family, serving my city, serving my church. I'm thankful for the grace of God and the willingness to forgive. I have nothing to be ashamed of. A lot of things that were said were taken out of context. In conclusion, I love my family. They're number one. And, again, I'm sorry for what my actions have caused."

Shortly after the article's publication, Copeland told former Phenix City School Superintendent Larry DiChiara, a friend of his, that he was experiencing "dark days." DiChiara later stated that he had contacted Copeland because he was concerned about his well-being due to "people just relentlessly attacking" him online.

On November 3, another 1819 News article claimed that Copeland had written fiction containing violent fantasies. It also claimed that he republished photos of community members, including minors, online without their consent. One story described a transgender woman's deadly obsession with a local business owner, which the article claimed was based on a real person and business. An acquaintance of Copeland's said that he had posted her name and social media photos online; she also recognized the names of local women in Copeland's allegedly fictional stories, calling the writing "disturbing".

The same day, deputy sheriffs were responding to a request for a welfare check for Copeland when they spotted him driving. A slow pursuit ensued until Copeland pulled over in Beulah, exited his vehicle, and shot himself with a handgun. Copeland's church at Phenix City held a mourning service two days after his death. Political leaders from the area scheduled a prayer service for him on November 7 at the Phenix City Amphitheatre. A funeral was scheduled for November 9 at the First Baptist Church, with a burial set for November 10. Lee County Sheriff Jay Jones later said that the circumstances of Copeland's death were under investigation, though his social media posts were not.

Copeland's suicide received national attention. Lee County Democratic Party Chairperson Jamie Lowe called Copeland "the backbone of Smiths Station" and condemned "the use of discriminatory and hateful rhetoric to target the personal lives of individuals." Doug Jones, the former U.S. senator from Alabama, described the treatment Copeland received from 1819 News as "sad and disgusting."

== Electoral history ==
2016 Smiths Station mayoral election
Party	Candidate	Votes	%
Nonpartisan	F. L. "Bubba" Copeland	569	73.42
Nonpartisan	John "Buster" Bessant	206	26.58
Total votes		775	100.0

2020 Smiths Station mayoral election
Party	Candidate	Votes	%
Nonpartisan	F. L. "Bubba" Copeland	Unopposed	
Total votes		—N/a	100.0
