= Lee County Schools (Alabama) =

School district in Alabama, United States

Address
- 2410 Society Hill Road Opelika, Alabama, 36804; United States

District information
- Type: Public
- Grades: PK–12
- Schools: 14
- NCES District ID: 0102070

Students and staff
- Students: 9,026 (2025–2026)
- Teachers: 611.11 (on an FTE basis) (2025–2026)
- Staff: 394.40 (on an FTE basis) (2025–2026)
- Student–teacher ratio: 14.77 (2025–2026)

Other information
- Website: www.lee.k12.al.us

The Lee County School District—commonly called Lee County Schools— is the public school district for Lee County, Alabama, United States, excluding the parts of the county in the Auburn, Opelika, and Phenix City city limits. Students in the Lee County Schools attend schools in one of four attendance areas: Beauregard, Beulah, Loachapoka, and Smiths Station. In 2010, the district enrolled 9,738 students in grades K-12.

== Attendance areas ==
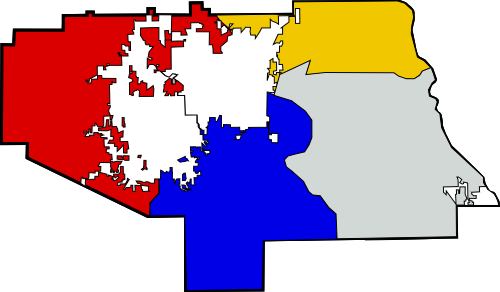
Lee County Schools attendance areas. Beauregard - blue Beulah - gold Loachapoka - red Smiths Station - silver Not served by Lee County Schools - white

=== Beauregard ===
- Beauregard Elementary School (K-4)
- Sanford Middle School (5-8)
- Beauregard High School (9-12)

=== Beulah ===
- Beulah Elementary School (K-6)
- Beulah High School (7-12)

=== Loachapoka ===
- Loachapoka Elementary School (K-6)
- Loachapoka High School (7-12)

=== Smiths Station ===
- South Smiths Station Elementary School (Pre-K)
- West Smiths Station Elementary School (K-1)
- East Smiths Station Elementary School (2-3)
- Wacoochee Elementary School (4-5)
- Smiths Station Junior High School (6-8)
- Smiths Station High School (9-12)

== See also ==
- List of school districts in Alabama
- Auburn City Schools
