= Lardarius Webb =

American football player (born 1985)

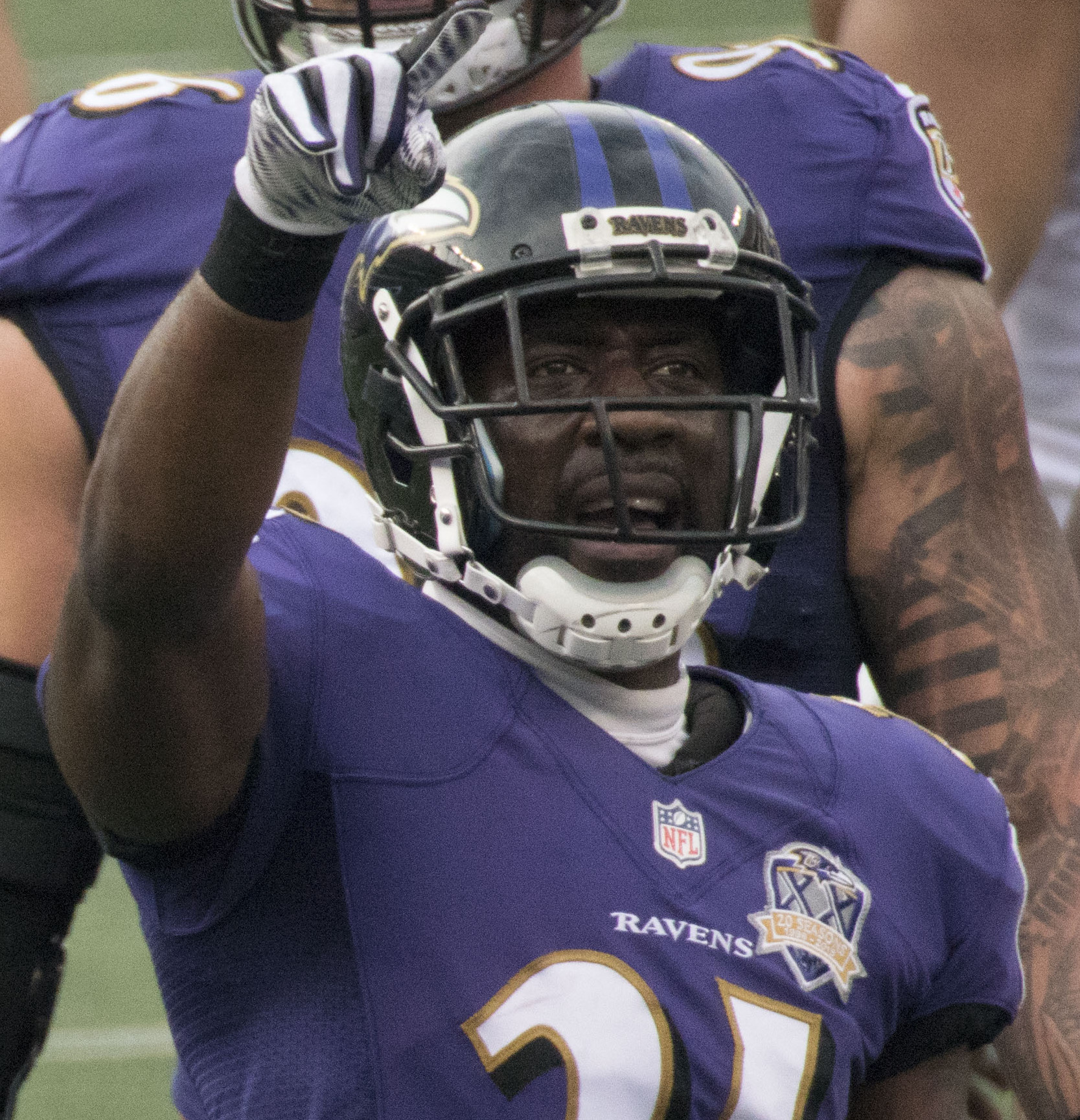
- Webb with the Baltimore Ravens in 2015

No. 21
- Positions: Cornerback; Return specialist

Personal information
- Born: October 12, 1985 (age 41); Opelika, Alabama, U.S.
- Listed height: 5 ft 10 in (1.78 m)
- Listed weight: 185 lb (84 kg)

Career information
- High school: Beauregard (Beauregard, Alabama)
- College: Southern Miss (2004–2006); Nicholls State (2007–2008)
- NFL draft: 2009: 3rd round, 88th overall pick

Career history
- Baltimore Ravens (2009–2017)

Awards and highlights
- Super Bowl champion (XLVII)

Career NFL statistics
- Total tackles: 467
- Sacks: 5
- Forced fumbles: 3
- Interceptions: 15
- Return yards: 985
- Total touchdowns: 3
- Stats at Pro Football Reference

Lardarius Webb (born October 12, 1985) is an American former professional football player who was a cornerback in the National Football League (NFL). He played college football for the Nicholls State Colonels and the Southern Miss Golden Eagles. Webb was selected by the Baltimore Ravens in the third round of the 2009 NFL draft.

== Early life ==
Webb attended Beauregard High School in Alabama. Webb played both quarterback and cornerback in high school. As a junior, Webb rushed 1,011 yards with 12 touchdowns and passed for 731 yards and six touchdowns. On defense, he had 47 tackles, two fumble recoveries, and seven interceptions. In his senior season, Webb rushed for 738 yards with 15 rushing touchdowns and passed for 412 yards with four touchdowns. This was nearly enough to break Jesse Costa's record of 1,945 rushing yards for 19 touchdowns and 4,342 passing yards for 16 touchdown. On defense, Webb recorded 52 tackles, three fumble recoveries, and led the state of Alabama with 10 interceptions. For his efforts in high school football, Webb was named first-team all-state defensive back for both his junior and senior year. He was named Team MVP and participated in the Mississippi/Alabama All-Star Game.

== College career ==
=== University of Southern Mississippi ===
In 2004, Webb signed with the University of Southern Mississippi. In his freshman year, Webb played in all 12 games for the Golden Eagles. In his sophomore year, Webb finished sixth on the team in tackles with 55.

=== Nicholls State University ===
Webb transferred to Nicholls State University in the spring of 2007. In his first game with the Colonels, the defensive back recorded three interceptions against Rice University, one of which he returned for a touchdown. Later in the season, the coaching staff for Nicholls State made the decision to let Webb play quarterback as well as defensive back. Since played option quarterback in high school and Nicholls was currently operating out of the option, this made sense. In his first start as a quarterback (sharing snaps with Zach Chauvin) against Azusa Pacific University, Webb rushed for 120 yards on eight carries and scored one touchdown. Following the end of the season, Webb was named an AP 1st team All-American and finished 10th out of 34 championships finalist for the honorable Buck Buchanan Award presented in FCS football. He is the only player in NCAA Division I history to receive the conference awards of Offensive Player of the Week, Defensive Player of the Week, and Special Teams Player of the Week in a single season. In 2007, Webb was named a finalist for the Buck Buchanan Award, an award given to the most outstanding defensive player of the year in the Football Championship Subdivision of college football.

== Professional career ==
Pre-draft measurables
Height	Weight	Arm length	Hand span	40-yard dash	10-yard split	20-yard split	20-yard shuttle	Three-cone drill	Vertical jump	Broad jump	Bench press
5 ft 9 3/4 in (1.77 m)	179 lb (81 kg)	31 1/2 in (0.80 m)	9 in (0.23 m)	4.46 s	1.56 s	2.59 s	4.10 s	6.77 s	36.5 in (0.93 m)	10 ft 1 in (3.07 m)	15 reps
All values from NFL Combine

=== Baltimore Ravens ===
==== 2009 season ====
Webb was selected by the Baltimore Ravens in the third round (88th pick overall) in the 2009 NFL draft.

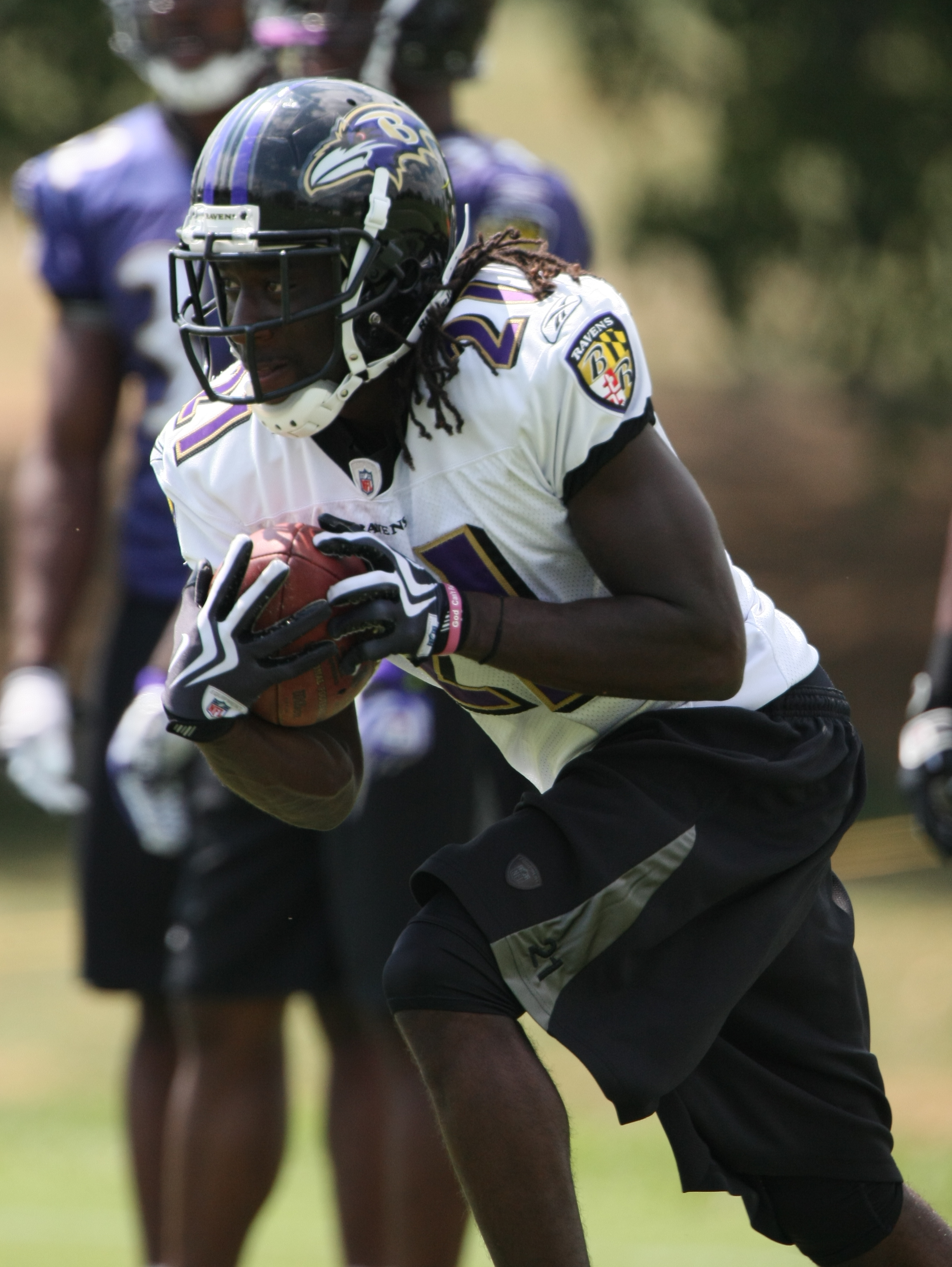
Webb at Ravens training camp in August 2009.

After becoming the team's starting kick returner in Week 5, Webb returned the opening third quarter kick off 95 yards for a touchdown in Week 8 against the Denver Broncos. However, on December 20, in a Week 15 win over the Chicago Bears, Webb tore his anterior cruciate ligament and missed the remainder of the season. Although he only became a starter in the second half of the season, Webb quickly established himself as one of the team's best cornerbacks because of his ability to play on an island and fine tackling, especially in run support. He finished his rookie season with 35 tackles (32 solo), 1 sack and 6 pass break-ups. He also returned 35 kick-offs for 918 yards (26.2 average) and a touchdown.

==== 2010 season ====
On November 8, 2010, Webb recorded his first career interception off a pass from Miami Dolphins quarterback Chad Henne and returned it 32 yards. Webb would end the season with 54 tackles (47 solo), 9 pass break-ups and 2 interceptions. In addition, he returned 21 punts for 199 yards (9.5 average). Following the season, he was praised for his ability to defend deep passes.

==== 2011 season ====
Early in the 2011 season, injuries forced Webb into the starting lineup, where he excelled and demonstrated he was the team's most talented corner. Webb garnered considerable Pro Bowl buzz (although he was not voted in) after notching five interceptions during the regular season, returning one for a 73-yard score against the New York Jets, and being the only starting defensive back to not allow a touchdown the entire season. In fact, quarterbacks had an average rating of 55.6 when throwing the ball against him. On December 4, 2011, Webb returned a punt for a 68-yard touchdown against the Cleveland Browns. This was Webb's first career punt return for a touchdown, and the team's first punt return for a touchdown since 2007. Webb attributed his elevated play to full recovery from his knee injury and his bulking up in the offseason to prepare to become the slot cornerback. He finished the regular season fourth on the team in tackles with 68 and first on the team in interceptions with five. Webb also had a sack. Webb added three more interceptions in the playoffs.

==== 2012 season ====
In the 2012 offseason, Webb signed a six-year extension, worth reportedly $50 million with more than $20 million guaranteed, with the Ravens as a restricted free agent.

Webb had a strong start to the year before tearing his ACL in Week 6 against the Dallas Cowboys, ending his season with 25 tackles (24 solo), one interception and one forced fumble. On October 16, 2012, he was officially placed on Injured Reserve. Without Webb, the Ravens would win Super Bowl XLVII after defeating the San Francisco 49ers 34-31.

==== 2013 season ====
On November 10, 2013, in an AFC North divisional game versus the Cincinnati Bengals, Webb recorded his first interception since tearing his ACL the previous season when he picked off Bengals quarterback Andy Dalton. Webb notched his second interception of the year on December 29, 2013, on an errant pass also thrown by Dalton. Webb finished the 2013 season with 63 tackles, 22 passes defensed, and two interceptions.

==== 2014 season ====
In the 2014 season, Webb appeared in 13 games and started 11. He recorded one interception, eight passes defended, and 55 tackles.

==== 2015 season ====
In the 2015 season, Webb appeared in 15 games and started 14. He recorded one interception, 11 passes defended, and 55 tackles.

==== 2016 season ====
Webb switched his position from cornerback to free safety at the start of the 2016 offseason.

==== 2017 season ====
On March 10, 2017, Webb was released by the Ravens. He was re-signed to a three-year deal on April 8, 2017.

In the 2017 season opener against the Cincinnati Bengals, Webb had an interception off of quarterback Andy Dalton in the second quarter. The interception helped the Ravens set up the offense for a Terrance West rushing touchdown in the 20–0 victory. In the Week 2 game against the Cleveland Browns, he recorded an interception off of quarterback DeShone Kizer in the fourth quarter of the 24–10 victory.

On March 12, 2018, Webb was released by the Ravens.

== NFL career statistics ==
Legend
	Led the league
**Bold**	Career high

=== Regular season ===
Year	Team	Games		Tackles					Interceptions					Fumbles			
Year	Team	GP	GS	Cmb	Solo	Ast	Sck	TFL	Int	Yds	TD	Lng	PD	FF	FR	Yds	TD
2009	BAL	14	4	35	32	3	1.0	**5**	0	0	0	0	6	0	0	0	0
2010	BAL	15	0	54	47	7	0.0	1	2	32	0	32	9	0	**2**	0	0
2011	BAL	**16**	15	67	54	13	1.0	1	**5**	**81**	**1**	**73**	20	**1**	**2**	0	0
2012	BAL	6	6	25	24	1	0.0	0	1	8	0	8	6	**1**	1	0	0
2013	BAL	**16**	**16**	**74**	**63**	11	0.0	2	2	19	0	19	**22**	0	0	0	0
2014	BAL	13	11	46	36	10	0.0	0	1	0	0	0	8	0	0	0	0
2015	BAL	15	15	54	48	6	0.0	2	1	3	0	3	11	0	0	0	0
2016	BAL	**16**	**16**	73	59	**14**	1.0	2	1	0	0	0	5	0	0	0	0
2017	BAL	**16**	3	39	37	2	**2.0**	4	2	10	0	10	4	**1**	0	0	0
		127	86	467	400	67	5.0	17	15	153	1	73	91	3	5	0	0

=== Playoffs ===
Year	Team	Games		Tackles					Interceptions					Fumbles			
Year	Team	GP	GS	Cmb	Solo	Ast	Sck	TFL	Int	Yds	TD	Lng	PD	FF	FR	Yds	TD
2009	BAL	0	0	Did not play due to injury													
2010	BAL	**2**	0	5	5	0	0.0	0	0	0	0	0	0	0	0	0	0
2011	BAL	**2**	**2**	**10**	**8**	**2**	0.0	0	**3**	**1**	0	**1**	**5**	0	0	0	0
2012	BAL	0	0	Did not play due to injury													
2014	BAL	**2**	**2**	9	**8**	1	0.0	0	0	0	0	0	0	0	0	0	0
		6	4	24	21	3	0.0	0	3	1	0	1	5	0	0	0	0

== Personal life ==
Lardarius Webb has three children with wife Toya—Lardarius Jr., Landon and Layla. Webb is the cousin of NBA Hall of Famer Mitch Richmond and the uncle of former South Alabama running back, La'Damian Webb.
