= Mr. Football (Alabama) =

Prestigious American high school-level sporting award

The Alabama Mr. Football award is, as in other states, an honor given to the top high school football player in the state of Alabama; it is awarded by a panel of sports writers.

== List of the Alabama Sports Writers Association's Mr. Football award winners ==
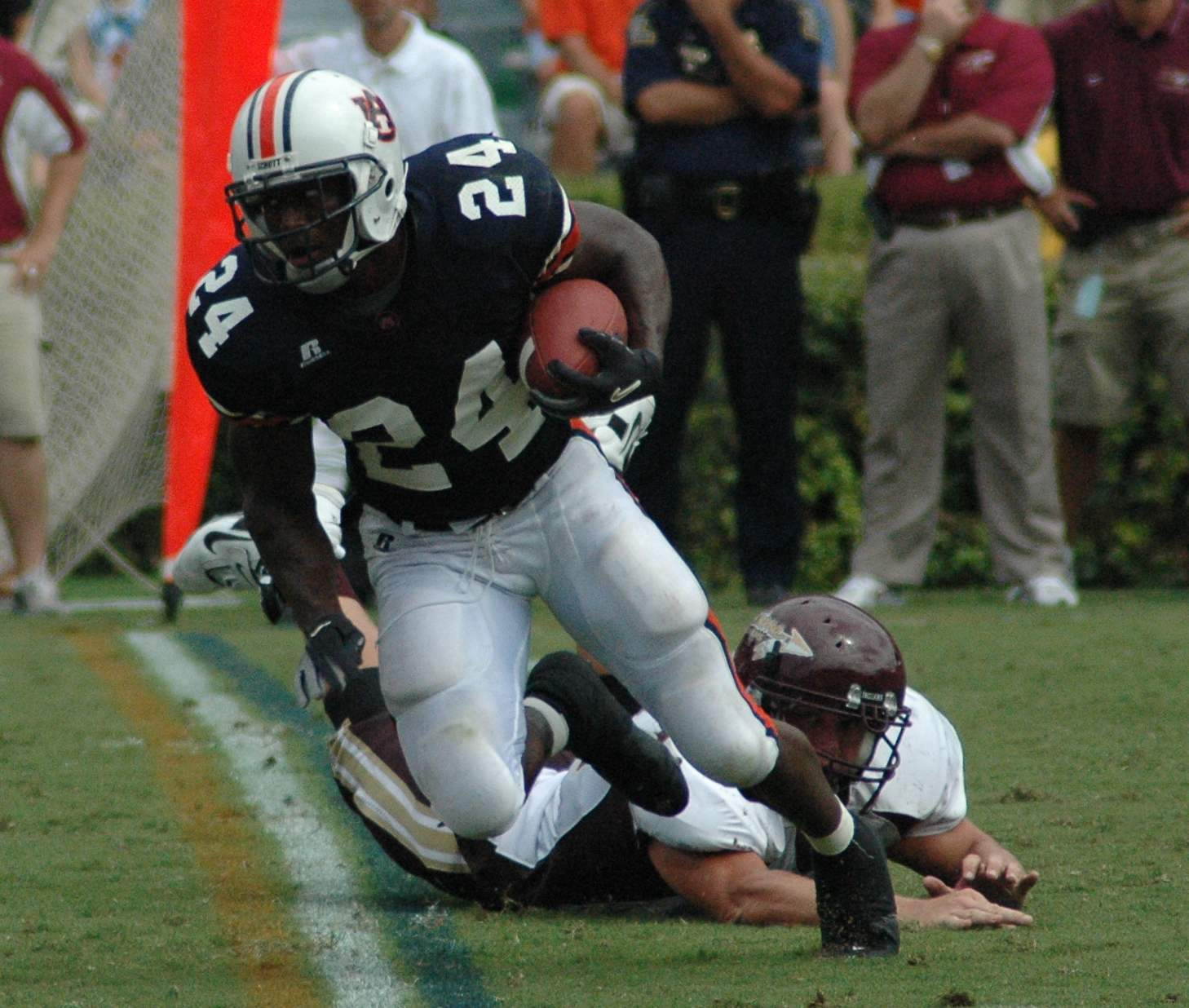
Carnell "Cadillac" Williams was 2000's Mr. Football from Etowah High School.

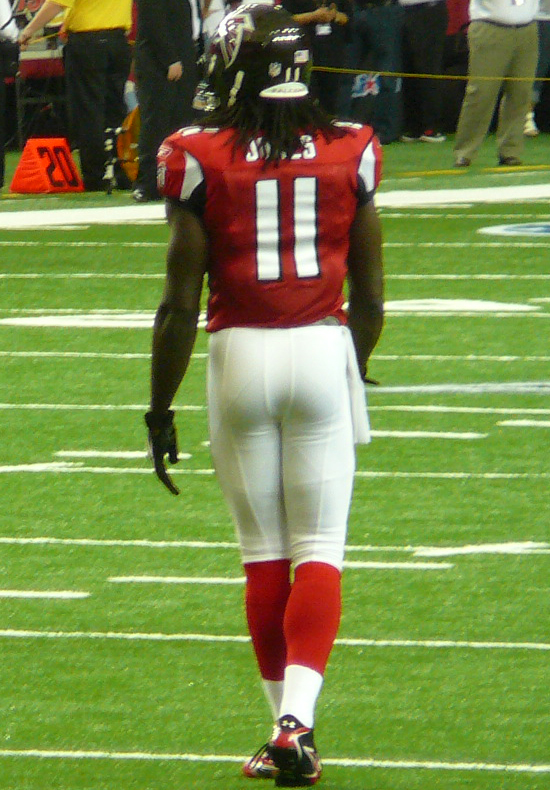
Julio Jones was 2007's Mr. Football from Foley High School.

List of Mr. Football award winners showing the year won, player, position, high school, college and professional teams played for
Year	Player name	Position	High school	College	Professional team(s)
1982	Tommy Compton	Quarterback	Vigor	North Alabama	
1983	Freddy Weygand	Wide receiver	Emma Sansom	Auburn	Chicago Bears
1984	Roderick Green	Wide receiver	Gardendale	Southern Miss	
1985	Pierre Goode	Running back	Hazlewood	Alabama	
1986	Larry Ware	Running back	Lee-Montgomery	Georgia	
1987	Robert Jones	Running back	Parker	Alabama	
1988	Darrell Williams	Running back	Vigor	Auburn	
1989	Steven Coleman	Running back	Pike County	Troy State	
1990	David Palmer	Quarterback	Jackson-Olin	Alabama	Minnesota Vikings
1991	Robert Davis	Running back	Homewood	LSU	
1992	Freddie Kitchens	Quarterback	Etowah	Alabama	
1993	Thomas Banks	Running back	West Jefferson	UAB	
1994	Dawud Rasheed	Running back	Shades Valley	Duke	
1995	Gorman Thornton	Tight end	Jefferson Davis	Alabama	
1996	Antoneyo Williams	Running back	Central-Tuscaloosa	Alabama	
1997	Mac Campbell	Running back	Alexandria	UAB	
1998	DeMarco McNeil	Defensive lineman	Blount	Auburn	
1999	Cory Whisenant	Running back	Springville	UAB	
2000	Cadillac Williams	Running back	Etowah	Auburn	Tampa Bay Buccaneers; St. Louis Rams
2001	Brandon Cox	Quarterback	Hewitt-Trussville	Auburn	
2002	JaMarcus Russell	Quarterback	Williamson	LSU	Oakland Raiders
2003	Chris Nickson	Quarterback	Pike County	Vanderbilt	
2004	Jarod Bryant	Quarterback	Hoover	Navy	
2005	Andre Smith	Offensive lineman	Huffman	Alabama	Cincinnati Bengals
2006	Larry Smith	Quarterback	Prattville	Vanderbilt	
2007	Julio Jones	Wide receiver	Foley	Alabama	Atlanta Falcons Tennessee Titans Tampa Bay Buccaneers Philadelphia Eagles
2008	Clint Moseley	Quarterback	Leroy	Auburn	
2009	Coty Blanchard	Quarterback	Cherokee County	Jacksonville State	
2010	Jamal Golden	Quarterback	Wetumpka	Georgia Tech	
2011	T. J. Yeldon	Running back	Daphne	Alabama	Jacksonville Jaguars
2012	Jeremy Johnson	Quarterback	Carver	Auburn	
2013	Roc Thomas	Running back	Oxford	Auburn	Minnesota Vikings
2014	Kerryon Johnson	Running back	Madison Academy	Auburn	Detroit Lions Philadelphia Eagles
2015	Tyler Johnston	Quarterback	Spanish Fort	UAB	
2016	La'Damian Webb	Running back	Beauregard	Jones College (MS); Florida State; South Alabama	
2017	Asa Martin	Running back	Austin	Memphis	
2018	Bo Nix	Quarterback	Pinson Valley	Auburn; Oregon	Denver Broncos
2019	Kristian Story	Quarterback	Lanett	Alabama	
2020	Ga'Quincy McKinstry	Defensive back	Pinson Valley	Alabama	New Orleans Saints
2021	Ryan Peppins	Wide receiver	Thompson	Utah	
2022	Ryan Coleman-Williams	Wide receiver	Saraland	Alabama	
2023	Ryan Coleman-Williams	Wide receiver	Saraland	Alabama	
2024	KJ Lacey	Quarterback	Saraland	Texas	
2025	Ezavier Crowell	Running back	Jackson	Alabama	
