= La'Damian Webb =

American football player (born 1999)

No. 13 – San Antonio Gunslingers
- Position: Running back

Personal information
- Born: December 24, 1999 (age 26)
- Listed height: 5 ft 8 in (1.73 m)
- Listed weight: 210 lb (95 kg)

Career information
- High school: Beauregard (Beauregard, Alabama)
- College: Jones College (MS) (2019, 2021); Florida State (2020); South Alabama (2022–2023)
- NFL draft: 2024: undrafted

Career history
- San Antonio Brahmas (2025)*; Massachusetts Pirates (2025); San Antonio Gunslingers (2026–present)
- * Offseason or practice squad member only

Awards and highlights
- Third-team All-Sun Belt (2023); First-team All-Sun Belt (2022)

La'Damian Tyreek Webb (born December 24, 1999) is an American professional football running back for the San Antonio Gunslingers of the Indoor Football League (IFL). He played college football for the Jones College Bobcats, Florida State Seminoles and South Alabama Jaguars.

== Early life ==
Webb grew up in Opelika, Alabama, and attended Beauregard High School. At Beauregard, he helped the football team win their first state championship during his junior year in 2016. He finished the season with 3,242 yards, which became the second-best single-season total in AHSAA history, and he also finished with 47 rushing touchdowns, tying the single-season record.

After his junior season, he won Alabama's Mr. Football Award becoming the first underclassman to win the award.

== College career ==
Webb was originally committed to play football for the Mississippi State Bulldogs but he did not meet academic requirements and he then committed to play for the Hutchinson Blue Dragons. He ended up sitting out for the 2018 season and never played for the team and transferred to Jones College once the season was over.

=== Jones College ===
Webb played nine games in the 2019 season and was named a MACJC Offensive Player of the Week after completing 182 all-purpose yards and 3 touchdowns during the Week 3 game. He was rated as the #3 junior college running back and the #51 overall junior college prospect by 247sports. He then signed to play for the Florida State Seminoles over offers from Ole Miss, Oklahoma State, Missouri, and West Virginia.

=== Florida State ===
Webb appeared in seven games during the 2020 season and started three games. He finished the season with 369 yards on 69 attempts and completed a season-best 109 yards on 12 carries during the Week 5 game against North Carolina. After the season, he announced that he was entering the transfer portal and announced hours after that he would be transferring to Troy.

=== Return to Jones College ===
Webb announced that he would be returning back to Jones College instead of playing for Troy. During his second stint with the Bobcats, he played 10 games while rushing for a single-season record 1,400 yards and 14 touchdowns to become the school's all-time leading rusher with 2,340 career yards. Shortly after the season ended, he announced his commitment to South Alabama.

=== South Alabama ===
During the 2022 season, Webb played 12 games and missed one due to an injury. He was named the Sun Belt Conference Offensive Player of the Week honoree twice and finished the regular season with 1,015 rushing yards making him the second player in school history to rush over 1,000 yards in a single season. He was ranked 13th in rushing touchdowns and 10th in total touchdowns. During the 2022 New Orleans Bowl, he had 12 carries for 48 yards and finished the year with 1,067 yards on 210 carries and was named a CFN All-American honorable mention.

On December 9, 2023, Webb declared for the 2024 NFL draft.

== Professional career ==
Pre-draft measurables
Height	Weight	Arm length	Hand span	Wingspan	40-yard dash	10-yard split	20-yard split	20-yard shuttle	Three-cone drill	Vertical jump	Broad jump	Bench press
5 ft 7 1/8 in (1.70 m)	211 lb (96 kg)	30 1/2 in (0.77 m)	9 1/8 in (0.23 m)	5 ft 11 3/4 in (1.82 m)	4.68 s	1.59 s	2.70 s	4.60 s	7.27 s	29.5 in (0.75 m)	9 ft 4 in (2.84 m)	19 reps
All values from Pro Day

On April 29, 2024, Webb received a rookie minicamp invite by the Miami Dolphins.

=== San Antonio Brahmas ===
On October 3, 2024, Webb signed with the San Antonio Brahmas of the United Football League (UFL). He was released on March 8, 2025.

=== Massachusetts Pirates ===
On July 24, 2025, Webb signed with the Massachusetts Pirates of the Indoor Football League (IFL).

=== San Antonio Gunslingers ===
On January 13, 2026, Webb signed with the San Antonio Gunslingers (indoor football) of the Indoor Football League (IFL).

== Personal life ==
Webb is the nephew of former NFL cornerback, Lardarius Webb and the cousin of cornerback Lardarius Webb Jr..
