= Lardarius Webb Jr. =

American football player (born 2003)

No. 34 – Baltimore Ravens
- Position: Cornerback
- Roster status: Practice squad

Personal information
- Born: January 11, 2003 (age 23); Opelika, Alabama, U.S.
- Listed height: 5 ft 9 in (1.75 m)
- Listed weight: 177 lb (80 kg)

Career information
- High school: Jackson Academy (Jackson, Mississippi)
- College: Jones College (MS) (2021–2022); Oklahoma State (2023); South Alabama (2024); Wake Forest (2025)
- NFL draft: 2026: undrafted

Career history
- Baltimore Ravens (2026–present)*
- * Offseason or practice squad member only

Awards and highlights
- 2× First-team All-MACCC (2021, 2022)
- Stats at Pro Football Reference

Lardarius Webb Jr. (born January 11, 2003) is an American professional football cornerback for the Baltimore Ravens of the National Football League (NFL). He played college football for the Jones College Bobcats, Oklahoma State Cowboys, South Alabama Jaguars, and Wake Forest Demon Deacons.

== Early life ==
Webb was born and grew up in Opelika, Alabama and attended Beauregard High School. During his junior season, he had 51 tackles and three interceptions. He transferred to Jackson Academy in Jackson, Mississippi for his senior season. At Jackson Academy, he played in 13 games, finishing the season with 58 total tackles, five tackles for loss, nine passes defended, eight carries for 34 yards, and one reception. He was named to the Clarion Ledger All-State second team as a defensive back and competed in the MAIS All-Star Game.

Webb originally committed to play college football at the University of Nebraska–Lincoln, but decommitted, signing with Jones College.

== College career ==
=== Jones College ===
During the 2021 season, Webb played in all 10 games with six starts. He finished the season with 29 total tackles, three tackles for loss, nine breakups, and three interceptions. He was also named first team all-MACCC.

During the 2022 season, he played in all 10 games. He finished the season with 28 total tackles and four tackles for loss. He also tallied six pass breakups and six interceptions, which tied for the NJCAA national lead, and returned a punt for 51 yards. He also earned NJCAA All-American honors.

=== Oklahoma State ===
Webb committed to play for the Oklahoma State Cowboys.

During the 2023 season, although he redshirted, he saw action in four games; he did not record any statistics.

On December 2, 2023, Webb announced that he would enter the NCAA transfer portal.

On December 22, 2023, Webb announced that he would transfer to Tulane; however, on January 4, 2024, he announced that he was back in the transfer portal.

=== South Alabama ===
On January 10, 2024, Webb announced that he would transfer to South Alabama.

During the 2024 season, he played in all 13 games and made 12 starts as a cornerback. He finished the season with 40 tackles, two interceptions, and three pass breakups, making his first career interception against LSU. He also recorded a tackle in the 2024 Salute to Veterans Bowl to help the Jaguars win against Western Michigan.

On April 23, 2025, Webb announced that he would enter the transfer portal for the third time.

=== Wake Forest ===
On April 27, 2025, Webb announced that he would transfer to Wake Forest.

During the 2025 season, he played in all 13 games, recording 36 tackles, two tackles for loss, a sack, and seven pass breakups. He allowed one catch on three targets for nine yards and recorded a pass breakup against Mississippi State in the 2026 Duke's Mayo Bowl.

== Professional career ==
Pre-draft measurables
Height	Weight	Arm length	Hand span	Wingspan	40-yard dash	10-yard split	20-yard split	20-yard shuttle	Three-cone drill	Vertical jump	Broad jump	Bench press
5 ft 9 1/8 in (1.76 m)	177 lb (80 kg)	29 5/8 in (0.75 m)	7 1/2 in (0.19 m)	5 ft 11 1/4 in (1.81 m)	4.46 s	1.53 s	2.59 s	4.39 s	7.00 s	31.5 in (0.80 m)	10 ft 1 in (3.07 m)	13 reps
All values from Pro Day

After not being selected in the 2026 NFL draft, Webb signed with the Baltimore Ravens as an undrafted free agent. He was waived by Baltimore on August 30, 2026, as a part of final roster cuts. Webb was re-signed to the team's practice squad on September 3. On September 13, Webb was released from the practice squad, then re–signed two days later.

== Personal life ==
Webb is the son of Lardarius Webb, a former NFL cornerback, and the cousin of former South Alabama running back La'Damian Webb.
