= Loachapoka High School =

Coordinates: 32°35′22″N 85°34′45″W

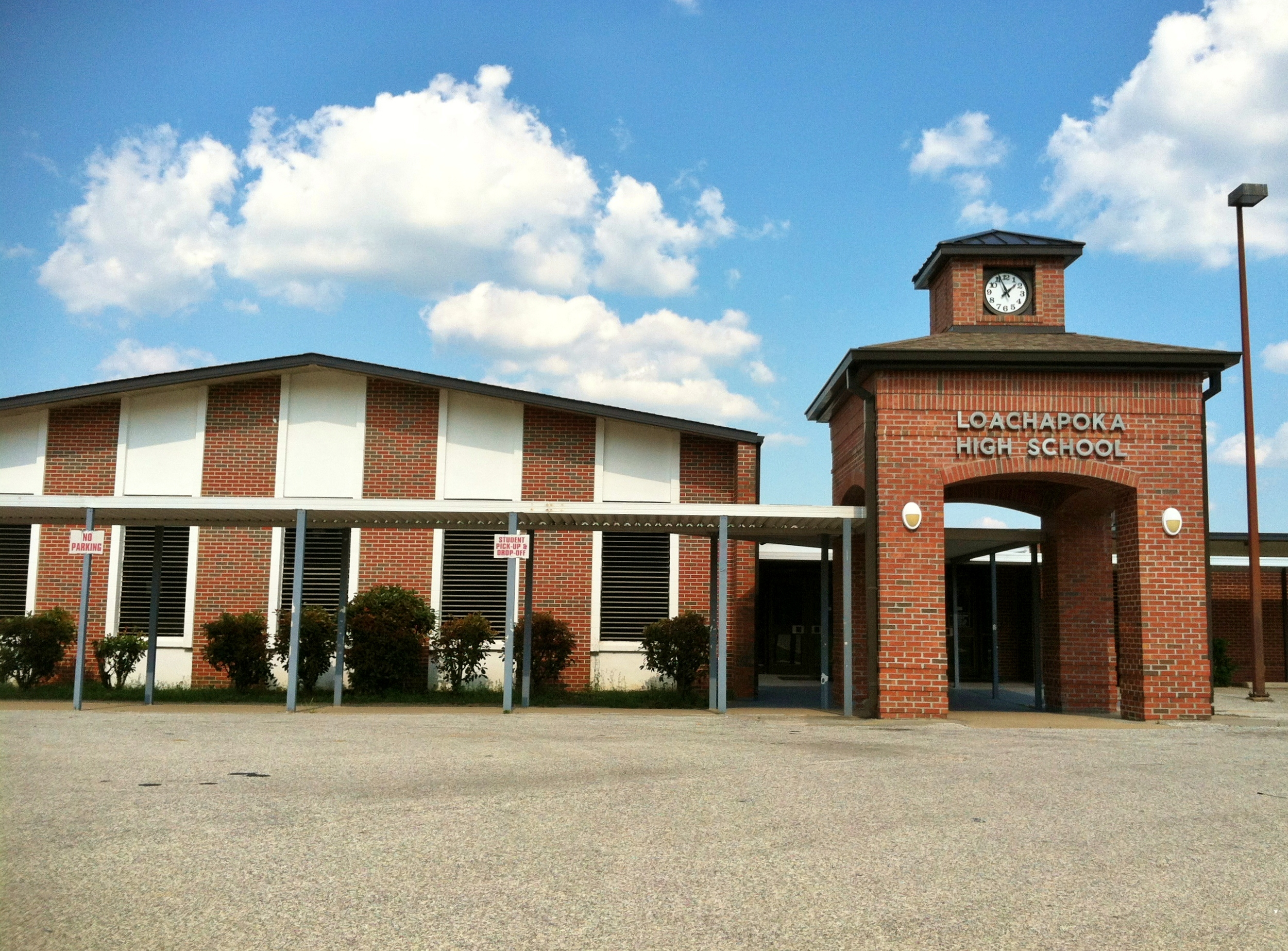

Location
- 985 Lee Road 61; Loachapoka, Alabama 36865; United States

Information
- School type: Public high school
- Founded: 1973 (53 years ago)
- School district: Lee County Schools
- CEEB code: 011671
- Principal: Albert Weeden, Jr.
- Teaching staff: 27.50 (FTE)
- Grades: 7–12
- Enrollment: 270 (2023–2024)
- Student to teacher ratio: 9.82
- Language: English
- Colors: Red and white
- Mascot: Indian
- Feeder schools: Loachapoka Elementary School
- Website: lph.lee.k12.al.us

Loachapoka High School is a high school in Loachapoka, Alabama, enrolling grades 7–12. The school enrolls 296 students, and is one of four high schools in the Lee County School District along with Beauregard, Beulah, and Smiths Station High Schools.

== History ==
While Loachapoka had its own high school in the late 19th and early 20th centuries, by the 1930s students in Loachapoka attended high school at either Drake or Auburn High Schools in nearby Auburn. In 1968, the Auburn City Schools ceased providing regular high school services for the Loachapoka area, and Loachapoka students were bused to Beauregard High School, so that students from the mostly African American Loachapoka area would have an opportunity to attend an integrated high school. Attendance at Beauregard, however, required some students to take round-trip bus rides of up to 96 miles daily; to limit this, the Lee County Schools Board of Education requested to expand the existing Loachapoka Junior High School (grades 7–10) to a full high school. The federal courts rejected this request to create Loachapoka High four times: in May 1970, July 1970, October 1970, and January 1971, arguing that opening Loachapoka High would "substantially decrease the desegregation in the Lee County School System".

In October 1971, Lee County Schools again requested to create Loachapoka High, with the courts opposing the request yet again, but allowing that they would reconsider if all of the students in the Loachapoka area were required to attend the school. Auburn High School agreed to stop allowing transfers from the Loachapoka area by 1973 so that Loachapoka High would be allowed to open. In the fall of 1973, Loachapoka High School opened, offering a full high school education in Loachapoka for the first time in decades.
