= Smiths Station High School =

Public high school in Smiths Station, Alabama, United States

Coordinates: 32°31′16″N 85°04′48″W

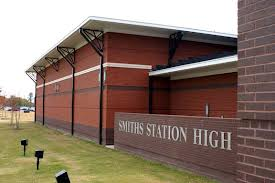

Location
- 4228 Lee Road 430; Smiths Station, Alabama 36877; United States

Information
- School type: Public
- Motto: Panther Pride! Go Panthers
- Established: 1918 (108 years ago)
- School board: Lee County Board Of Education
- School district: Lee County Schools
- Superintendent: Mike Howard
- CEEB code: 012500
- Principal: Adam Johnson
- Staff: 101.73 (FTE)
- Grades: 9-12
- Enrollment: 1,588 (2024–2025)
- Student to teacher ratio: 15.61
- Language: English
- Colors: Black, silver, and white
- Athletics conference: AHSAA Class 7A
- Mascot: Panthers
- Feeder schools: Smiths Station Junior High, South Smiths Station Elementary, West Smiths Station Elementary, East Smiths Station Elementary, Wacoochee Elementary
- Website: ssh.lee.k12.al.us

Smiths Station High School is a high school in Smiths Station, Alabama, enrolling grades 9 to 12. The school enrolls about 1,382 students, and is one of four high schools in the Lee County School District along with Beauregard, Beulah, and Loachapoka High Schools.

== History ==
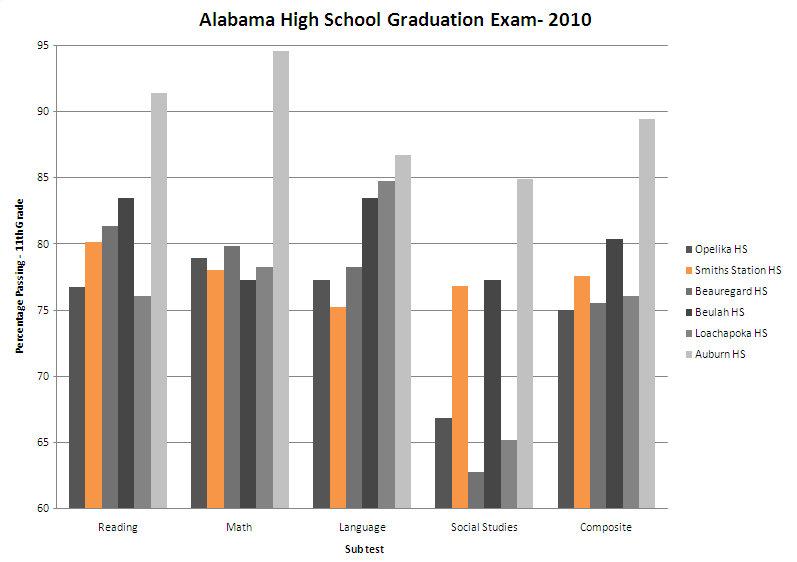
Test scores of Smiths Station High School juniors in 2010 on the Alabama High School Graduation Exam, compared with juniors at the other public high schools in Lee County

Smiths Station High School was formed in 1918 with the consolidation of rural one-room schools in the Smiths Station, Motts, and Oak Grove communities. Smiths Station High was the first full rural high school in the Lee County Schools, prior to its creation, all students wishing to complete high school had to travel to Auburn to attend Auburn High School. A new consolidated school was built in Smiths Station in 1918, and the high school soon absorbed Prince School (1919), Lee Bullard School (1928) and Salem High School (1929). J.B. Page served as principal of Smiths Station High from 1929 until 1972, during which time the school spun off Smiths Station Elementary School from its original K-12 configuration. Integration came to Smiths Station in 1970, with SSHS absorbing the black school Wacoochee High School in 1971, moving to a grades 10-12 configuration. Growth in the 1970s led to the shifting of grade 9 back to Smiths Station in 1976.

Between 1976 and the 2010 Smiths Station High School grew from an enrollment of about 600 to over 1800. In 2008, that growth, combined with expected future growth related to the 2005 Base Realignment and Closure involving nearby Fort Benning, led to the decision to build a new $32 million Smiths Station High School. The new facility opened in August 2011, with Smiths Station High adopting a grades 10-12 configuration.

Introduced in 2021, SSHS Girls' Flag Football played its way through the inaugural season in the state of Alabama, under volleyball and now flag football coach, Meg Larsen, making the playoffs, and finishing Runners Up in the state championship game, in double overtime.

== Notable faculty ==
- Dieter Brock, professional football player.
- Woodrow Lowe, professional football player.
