= Smiths Station, Alabama =

City in Alabama, United States

Smiths Station
- City
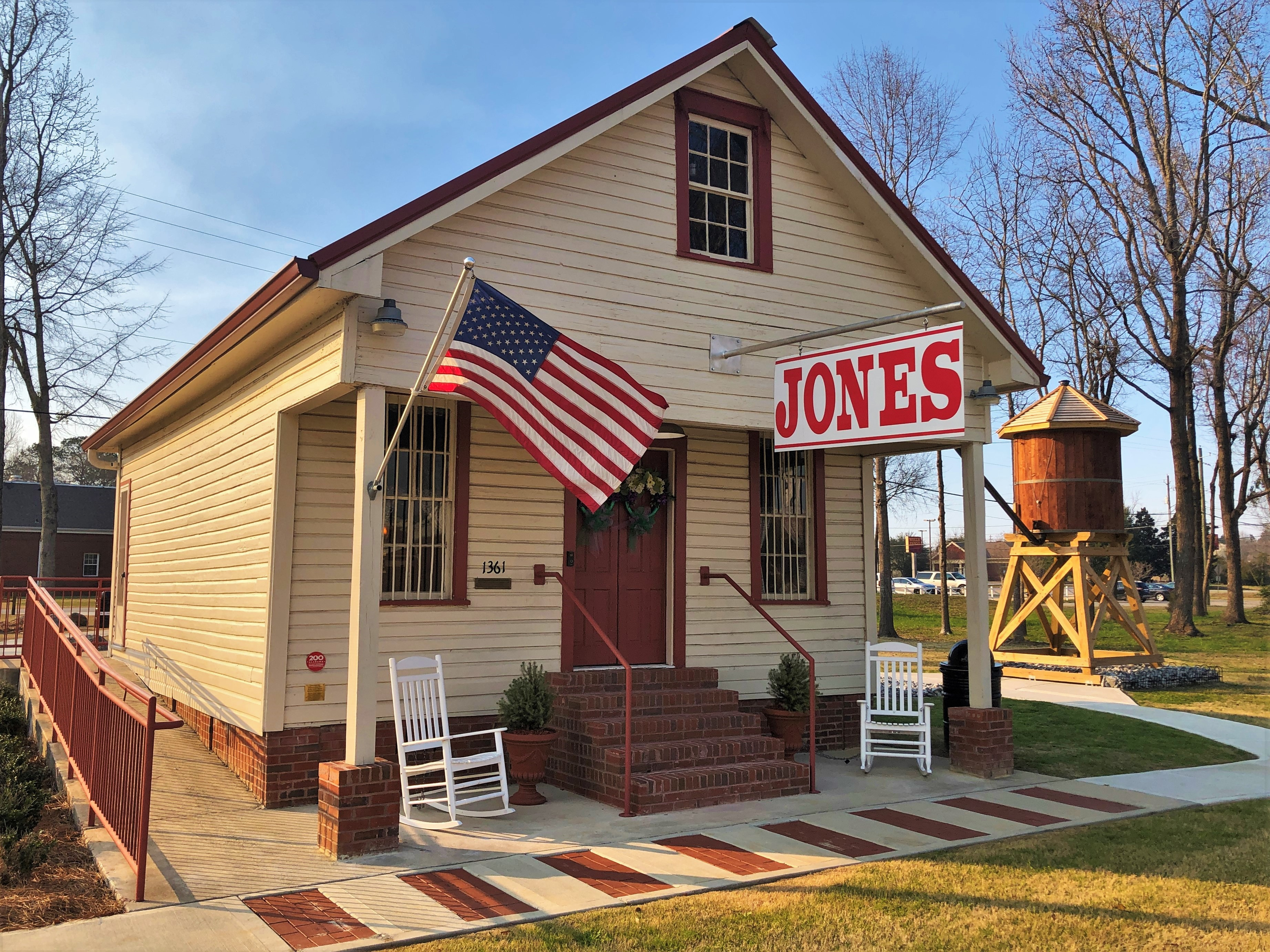
- The Historic Jones Store Museum in Smiths Station

- Flag Seal

- Location of Smiths Station in Lee County, Alabama.
- Coordinates: 32°30′54″N 85°05′45″W
- Country: United States
- State: Alabama
- Counties: Lee
- Established: June 22, 2001

Government
  - Mayor: Victoria Green

Area
  - City: 8.27 sq mi (21.41 km^{2})
  - Land: 8.24 sq mi (21.34 km^{2})
  - Water: 0.027 sq mi (0.07 km^{2})
- Elevation: 417 ft (127 m)

Population (2020)
  - City: 5,384
  - Density: 653.4/sq mi (252.27/km^{2})
  - Metro: 150,933
- Time zone: UTC–6 (Central Standard Time (CST))
  - Summer (DST): UTC–5 (Central Daylight Time (CDT))
- ZIP codes: 36877
- Area code: 334
- FIPS code: 01-71190
- GNIS feature ID: 2405476
- Website: www.smithsstational.gov

Smiths Station is a city in Lee County, Alabama, United States. As of the 2020 census, Smiths Station had a population of 5,384. It is part of the Columbus, Georgia metropolitan area. At the time of the 2000 census, it was still a census-designated place (CDP). The area that incorporated as Smiths Station in 2001 was much smaller than the CDP. Smiths Station, known to locals as "Smiths", is a bedroom community of Columbus, Georgia, and Phenix City, Alabama. Smiths Station High School has an enrollment of over 1,800 students and is the 11th-largest high school in the state.

== History ==
Smiths Station was first settled in 1738. The Central of Georgia Railway was extended through the community from Columbus, Georgia to Opelika, Alabama in 1845. The depot was named for Broadus Smith, a prominent early settler who lived near the city's current location.

Local legend contends that around 1960, local Jon Ergan grew tired of writing Smiths Station, so he took it upon himself to drop "Station" from the name of the community.

Smiths Station was officially incorporated on June 22, 2001, and is as of 2004 Alabama's second newest city next to Center Point.

On November 3, 2023, the city's mayor, Bubba Copeland, died by suicide after being publicly outed by reporter Craig Monger of conservative news website 1819 News for cross-dressing and adopting a transgender persona online.

== Geography ==
According to the U.S. Census Bureau, the CDP had a total area of 6.740 square miles (17.46 km^{2}), of which 6.713 square miles (17.39 km^{2}) is land and 0.027 square miles (0.070 km^{2}) is water.

The city is located in the southeastern part of Lee County, adjacent to Phenix City, which it borders to the southeast. U.S. Routes 280 and 431 run through the eastern part of the city, leading northwest 19 mi (31 km) to Opelika and southeast 8 mi (13 km) to Phenix City. Numerous county and local roads also run through the city as well, leading to more rural areas in Lee County.

=== Climate ===
The climate in this area is characterized by relatively high temperatures and evenly distributed precipitation throughout the year. According to the Köppen Climate Classification system, Smiths Station has a humid subtropical climate, abbreviated "Cfa" on climate maps.

On March 3, 2019, an EF4 tornado ripped through Smiths Station at high-end EF2 strength. Major damage occurred to homes, businesses and trees in the area.

== Demographics ==
Historical population
Census	Pop.	Note	%±
1990	3,456		—
2000	21,756		529.5%
2010	4,926		−77.4%
2020	5,384		9.3%
U.S. Decennial Census

From 1990 to 2001, the community was listed as Smiths CDP in the U.S. Census; the precipitous drop in population from 2000 to 2010 was due to just a segment of the CDP's incorporation as the city of Smiths Station. The remainder of the former CDP was disbanded as a separate entity for the 2010 census.

=== 2020 census ===
As of the 2020 census, Smiths Station had a population of 5,384. The median age was 40.7 years. 23.6% of residents were under the age of 18 and 17.0% of residents were 65 years of age or older. For every 100 females there were 97.6 males, and for every 100 females age 18 and over there were 93.8 males age 18 and over.

91.0% of residents lived in urban areas, while 9.0% lived in rural areas.

There were 2,107 households in Smiths Station, including 1,566 families. Of all households, 33.6% had children under the age of 18 living in them. Of all households, 51.2% were married-couple households, 17.9% were households with a male householder and no spouse or partner present, and 24.8% were households with a female householder and no spouse or partner present. About 24.1% of all households were made up of individuals and 10.1% had someone living alone who was 65 years of age or older.

There were 2,254 housing units, of which 6.5% were vacant. The homeowner vacancy rate was 1.4% and the rental vacancy rate was 8.1%.

Smiths Station racial composition
Race	Num.	Perc.
White (non-Hispanic)	3,886	72.18%
Black or African American (non-Hispanic)	997	18.52%
Native American	11	0.2%
Asian	40	0.74%
Pacific Islander	2	0.04%
Other/Mixed	229	4.25%
Hispanic or Latino	219	4.07%

=== 2010 census ===
At the 2010 census, there were 4,926 people in 1,913 households, including 1,407 families, in the city. There were 8,437 housing units. The racial makeup of the city was 80.3% White, 15.9% Black or African American, 0.7% Native American, 0.5% Asian, 0.0% Pacific Islander, 0.6% from other races, and 2.0% from two or more races. 2.8% of the population were Hispanic or Latino of any race.

Of the 1,913 households 31.1% had children under the age of 18 living with them, 53.9% were married couples living together, 15.1% had a female householder with no husband present, and 26.5% were non-families. 22.9% of households were one person and 7.5% were one person aged 65 or older. The average household size was 2.58 and the average family size was 2.99.

The age distribution was 24.1% under the age of 18, 9.0% from 18 to 24, 24.1% from 25 to 44, 29.7% from 45 to 64, and 13.1% 65 or older. The median age was 39.3 years. For every 100 females, there were 93.1 males. For every 100 females age 18 and over, there were 93.9 males.

The median household income was $47,969 and the median family income was $54,698. Males had a median income of $38,294 versus $25,394 for females. The per capita income for the city was $20,678. About 7.5% of families and 9.8% of the population were below the poverty line, including 13.7% of those under age 18 and 12.1% of those age 65 or over.

=== 2000 census ===
At the 2000 census, there were 21,756 people, 7,806 households, and 6,252 families in the CDP. The population density was 305.7 inhabitants per square mile (118.0/km^{2}). There were 8,437 housing units at an average density of 118.6 per square mile (45.8/km^{2}). The racial makeup of the CDP was 84.79% White, 12.67% Black or African American, 0.38% Native American, 0.39% Asian, 0.01% Pacific Islander, 0.74% from other races, and 1.03% from two or more races. 2.08% of the population were Hispanic or Latino of any race.

Of the 7,806 households 44.6% had children under the age of 18 living with them, 64.4% were married couples living together, 11.4% had a female householder with no husband present, and 19.9% were non-families. 16.5% of households were one person and 4.8% were one person aged 65 or older. The average household size was 2.79 and the average family size was 3.12.

The age distribution was 30.4% under the age of 18, 7.9% from 18 to 24, 34.9% from 25 to 44, 19.6% from 45 to 64, and 7.2% 65 or older. The median age was 32 years. For every 100 females, there were 98.4 males. For every 100 females age 18 and over, there were 95.7 males.

The median household income was $43,977 and the median family income was $47,765. Males had a median income of $32,246 versus $23,707 for females. The per capita income for the CDP was $17,608. About 7.2% of families and 8.9% of the population were below the poverty line, including 11.6% of those under age 18 and 11.2% of those age 65 or over.

== Education ==
Smiths Station forms a part of the Lee County School District.

Smiths Station High School is the city's only high school. Its school colors are black, white, and teal with a secondary use of silver; sports teams are called the Panthers. The school's "cheer squads" are award-winning and appear at all football and basketball games. In the past, the football team had more success, with the third-most Alabama state championship game appearances. The "Panther Spirit Marching Band" has been invited to march for the Queen of the United Kingdom and has performed in the Dunkin' Donuts Thanksgiving Day Parade in Philadelphia, Pennsylvania. The band holds three Grand Championship awards and numerous best-in-class awards. The track-and-field team has been nationally ranked several times and have numerous alumni throughout the nation competing at the DI, DII, and professional levels.

== Time zone ==
Although Alabama is legally in the Central Time Zone, Smiths Station's proximity to the larger cities of Phenix City and Columbus, Georgia causes areas within a 10–15 mile radius of Phenix City (including Smiths Station) to observe Eastern Time on a de facto basis.

== Transportation ==
Lee-Russell Public Transit provides dial-a-ride transit service throughout Smiths Station and the county.

== Notable person ==
- Conway Twitty, a country music singer born Harold Lloyd Jenkins in 1933, attended Smiths Station High School, where he played high school baseball.

== Gallery ==
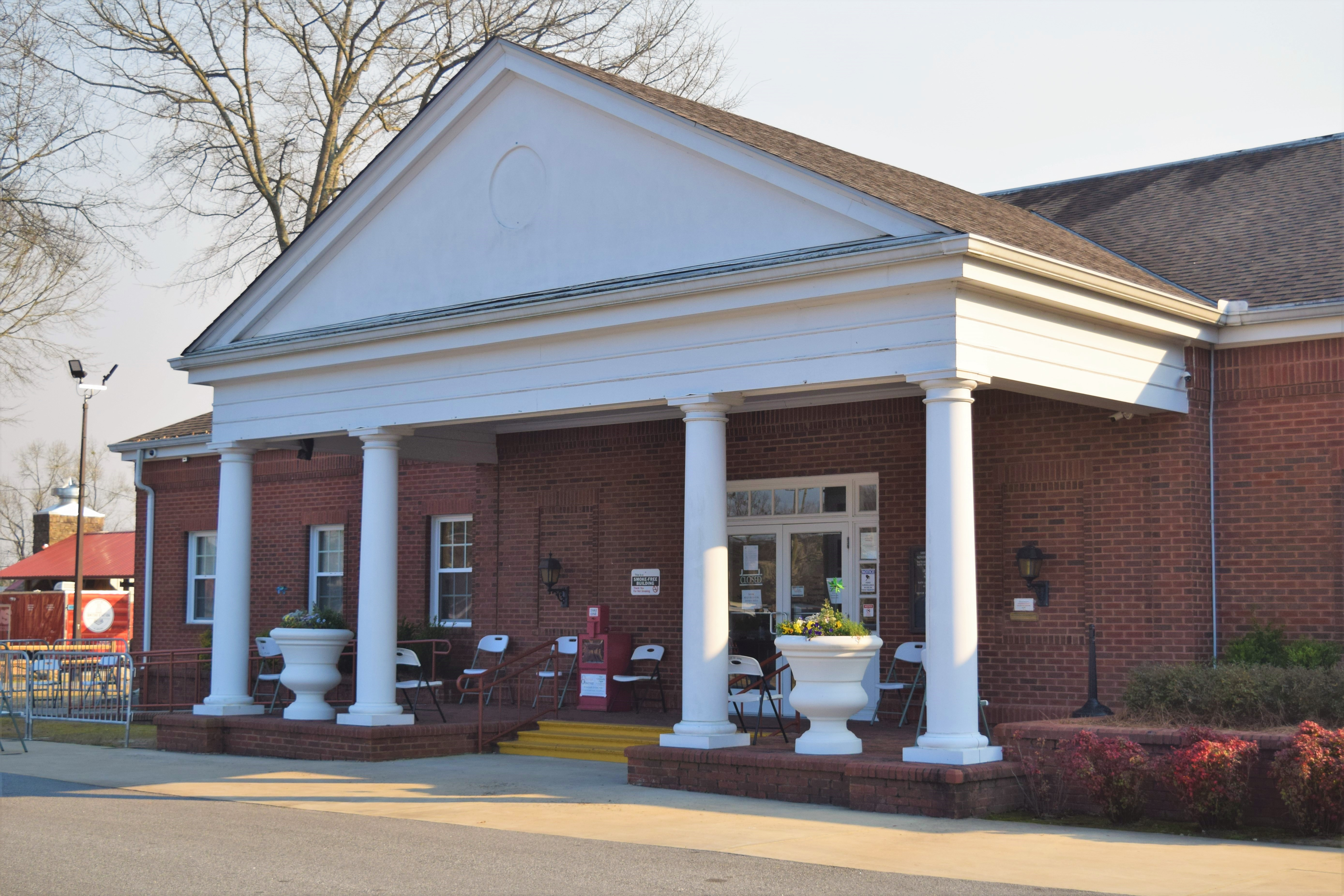
Smiths Station City Hall

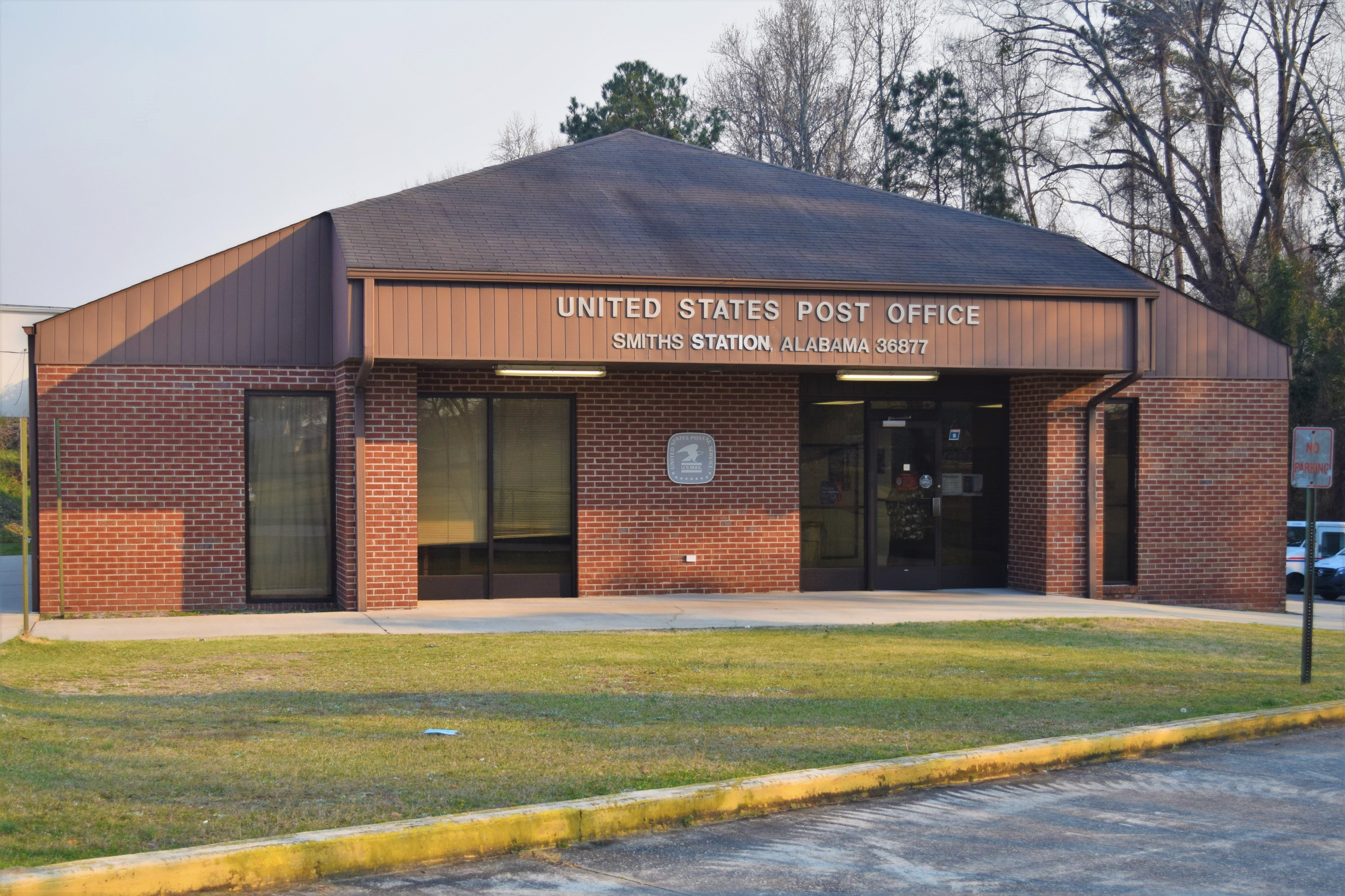
Smiths Station Post Office (ZIP code: 36877)

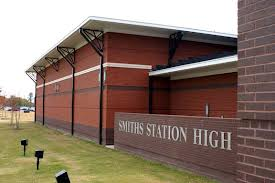
Smiths Station High School

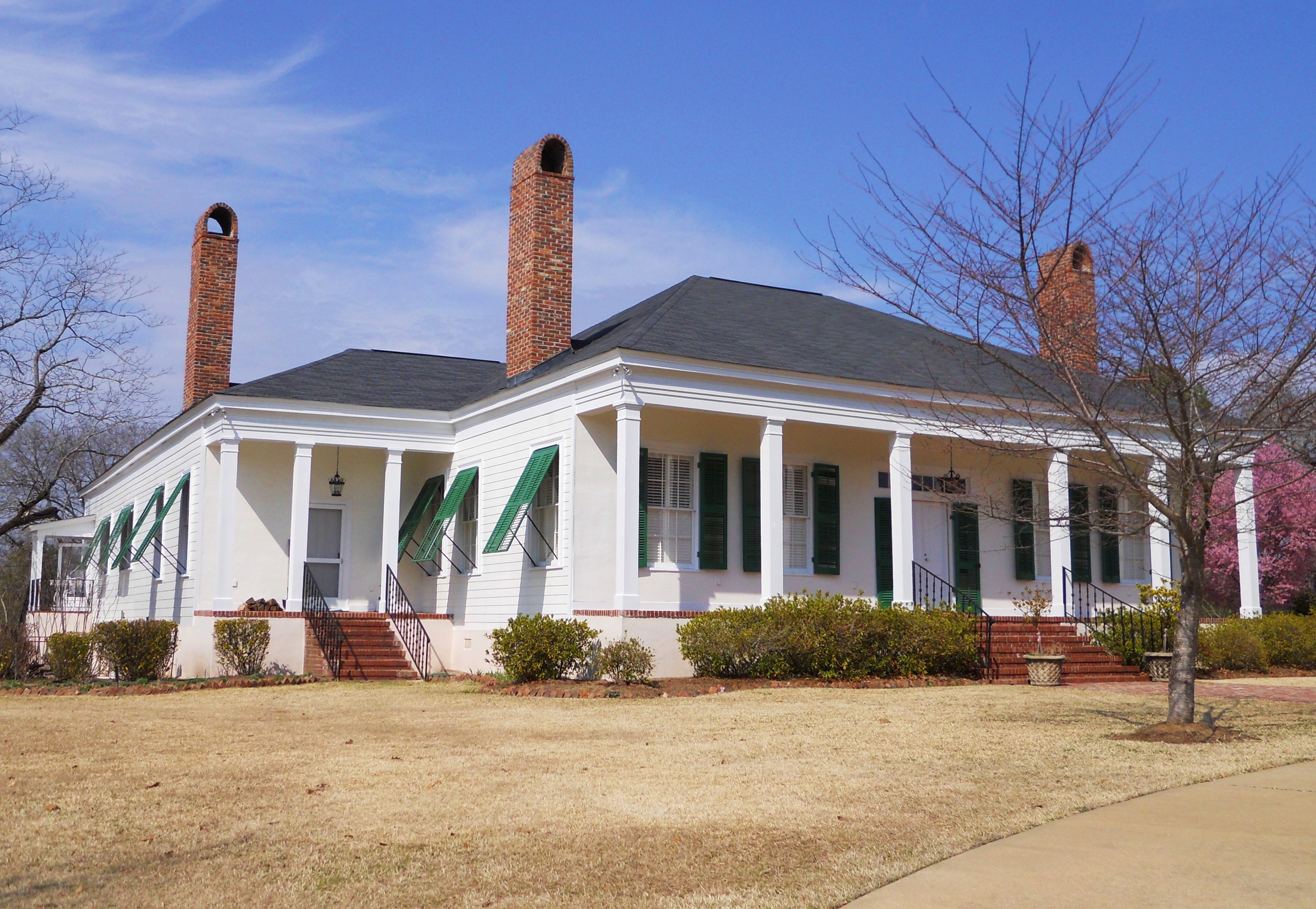
The Lowther House in Smiths Station was added to the National Register of Historic Places on
