= Loachapoka, Alabama =

Loachapoka, Alabama Lucv-Pokv (Creek)
- Town
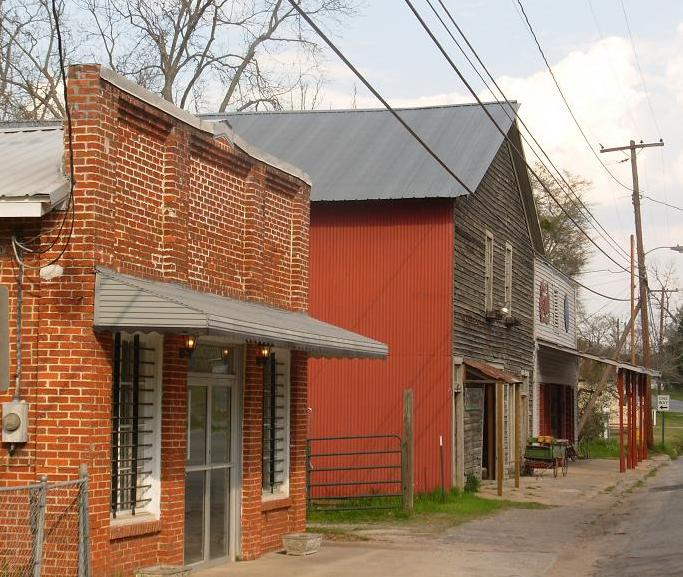
- Loachapoka Town Hall (left) and Fred's Feed & Seed and Pickin’ Parlor (right)

- Location of Loachapoka in Lee County, Alabama
- Coordinates: 32°36′18″N 85°35′41″W
- Country: United States
- State: Alabama
- County: Lee

Area
  - Total: 1.15 sq mi (2.97 km^{2})
  - Land: 1.14 sq mi (2.95 km^{2})
  - Water: 0.0077 sq mi (0.02 km^{2})
- Elevation: 689 ft (210 m)

Population (2020)
  - Total: 160
  - Density: 140.6/sq mi (54.27/km^{2})
- Time zone: UTC-6 (CST)
  - Summer (DST): UTC-5 (CDT)
- ZIP code: 36865
- Area code: 334
- FIPS code: 01-43744
- GNIS feature ID: 2406032

Loachapoka (/ˌloʊ.tʃəˈpoʊ.kə/ LOH-chə-POH-kə) is a town in Lee County, Alabama, United States. It is located less than 1/2 mile west of Auburn and about 5 miles (8 km) west of Auburn University, in west-central Lee County. As of the 2020 census, Loachapoka had a population of 160. It is part of the Auburn metropolitan area.

The name "Loachapoka" (Creek: Lucv-Pokv) means "turtle-killing place" in Muskogee, with lucv meaning "turtle" and pokv meaning "killing place". In literature, Lochapoka was the destination of the colonists in James H. Street's 1940 novel Oh, Promised Land.

Loachapoka is the location of the first Rosenwald School.

== Geography ==
According to the U.S. Census Bureau, the town has a total area of 1.2 square miles (3.1 km^{2}), all land.

== Government ==
Loachapoka is governed by a mayor and five town council members. In the most recent municipal election (2016), though, no incumbents submitted the qualifying paperwork to run for re-election. Therefore, the only citizen who did qualify for the ballot became mayor-elect, as per state law, and this was confirmed by the Alabama director of elections. When the mayor-elect brought the issue to light, several town, county, and state officials worked together in a poorly hatched plan to improperly disqualify the only candidate to follow the law for qualification, as referenced in several newspaper articles and audio recordings of town hall meetings. The corruption portrayed in this series of events reflects a pattern of politics in Alabama that has been commonplace for many years, as reported in the Harvard Political Review.

== History ==
Loachapoka was a Creek Indian town for some decades prior to white settlement. In the last census prior to the Native removal to Oklahoma, Loachapoka was found to have a population of 564. During the Creek War of 1836, Loachapoka was a center of rebellion; the town was destroyed by a force of Alabama and Georgia militia and friendly Creeks on May 15, 1836. Upon settlement by Euro-Americans, Loachapoka—temporarily renamed Ball's Fork—became the regional trade center, a position that was reinforced in 1845, when it became the easternmost point on the railroad to Montgomery. Loachapoka's influence peaked in the early 1870s, when its population reached nearly 1,300. Within a few years, a collapse of trade due to the Panic of 1873 and additional rail lines in the area sent Loachapoka into economic decline. Loachapoka roughly stabilized as a small farming community by the mid-20th century, and by the early 2000s, it had become a small-town suburb of Auburn. The mayor of Loachapoka is Ricky Holder.

== Culture ==
Loachapoka was home to two fall festivals, both held on the same day each fall—the annual Syrup Sopping Day to the south of Highway 14 and the Lee County Historical Fair at Pioneer Park, to the north of Highway 14. Many fairgoers were not aware that they were actually attending two celebrations of area history. The Syrup Sop featured the making of syrup in traditional methods from sorghum and ribbon cane. The Historical Fair featured life in the 1850s in east-central Alabama. The two festivals were combined into one named Pioneer Day. Combined, the two events attract more than 20,000 people to Loachapoka annually.

The Lee County Historical Society Museum is located in an 1845 general store in the Loachapoka historic district, located at Pioneer Park, a six-and-a-half-acre park of nine buildings and five gardens reminiscent of the 1850s in east-central Alabama.

== Photo gallery ==
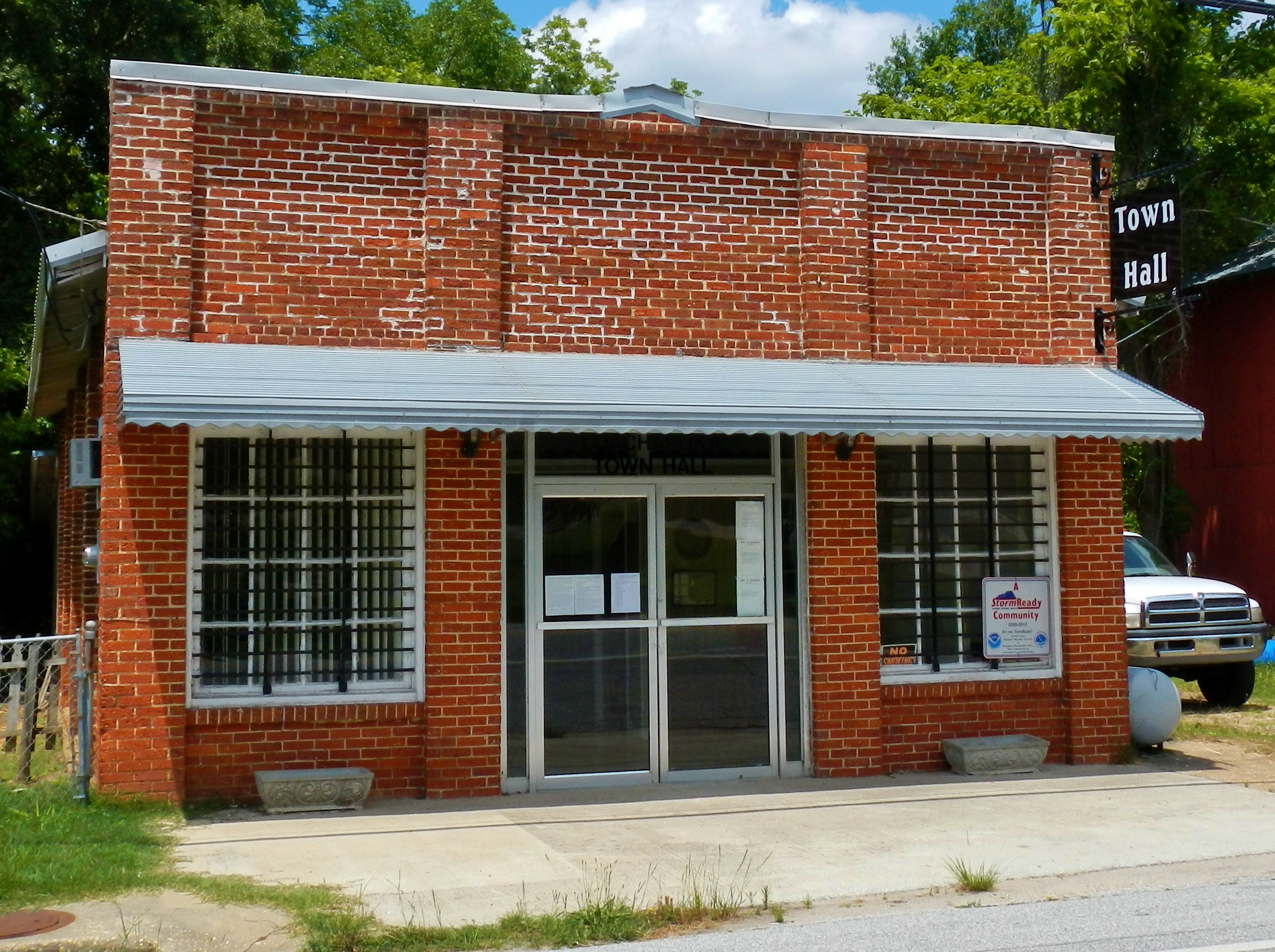
Loachapoka Town Hall

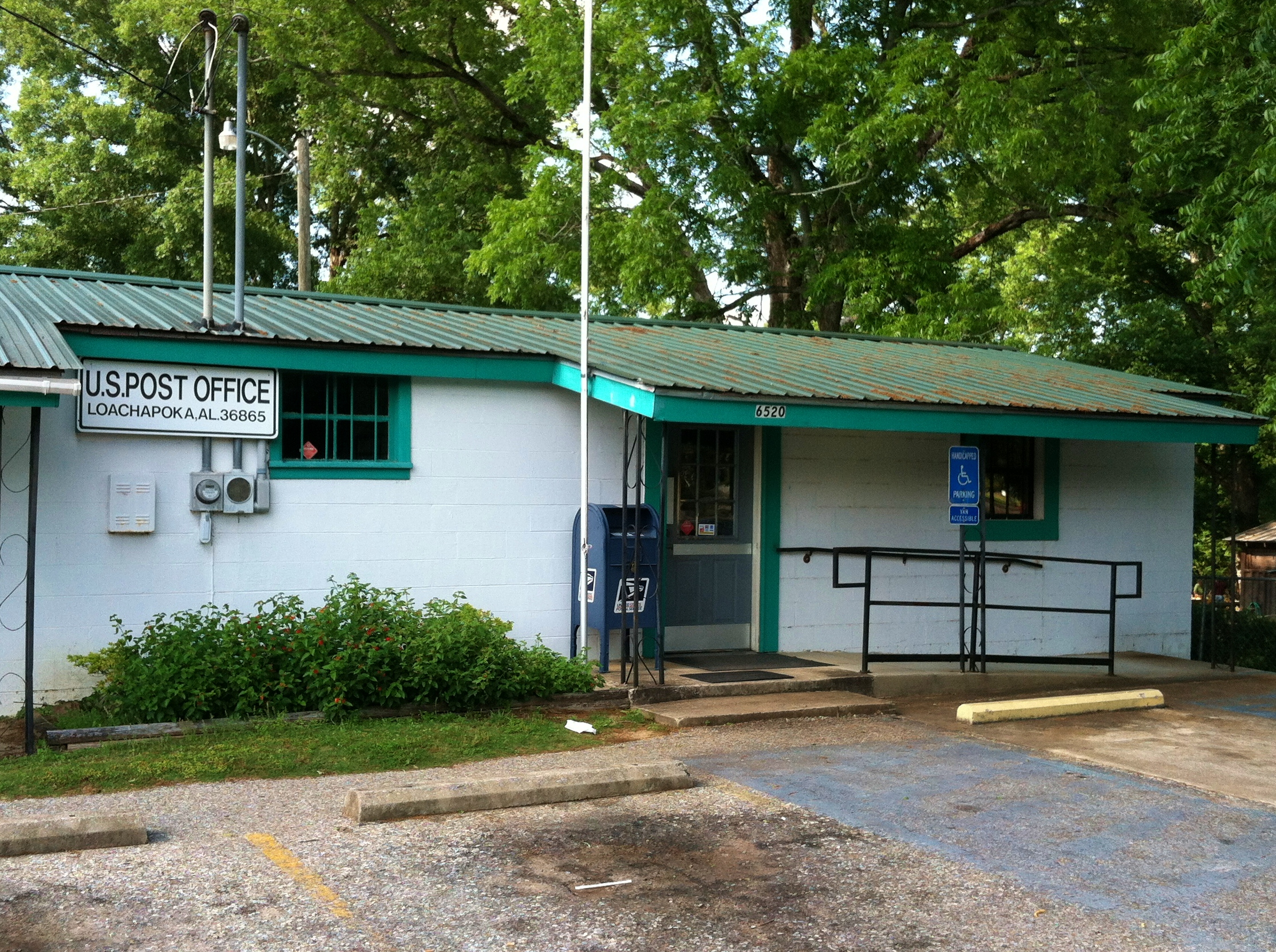
The post office in Loachapoka (ZIP code: 36865)

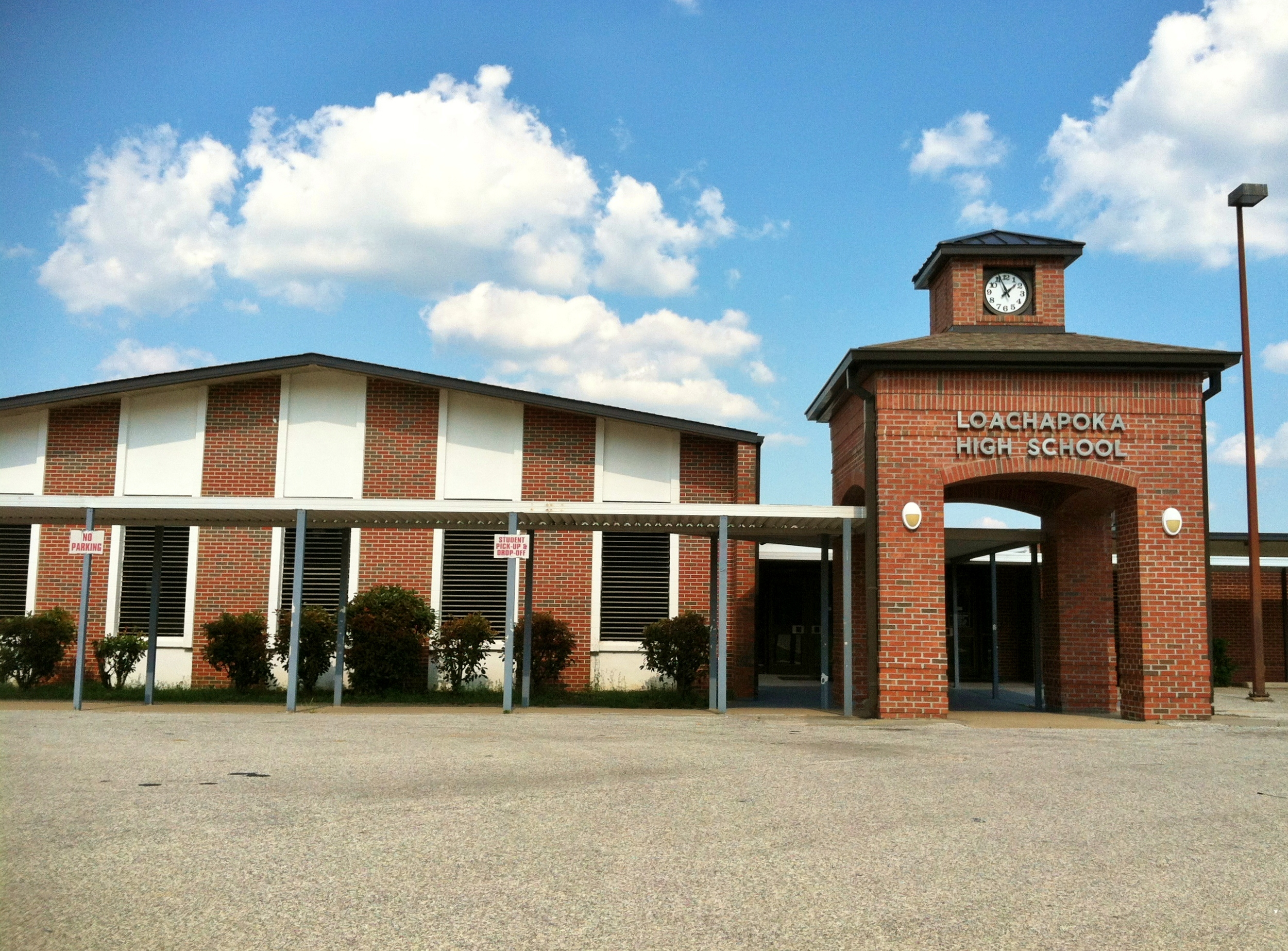
Loachapoka High School

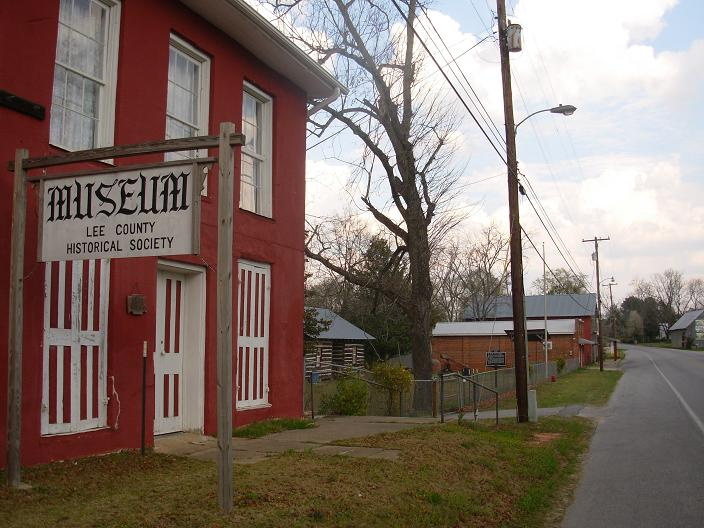
A general store built in 1845 now serves as the Lee County Historical Society] Museum

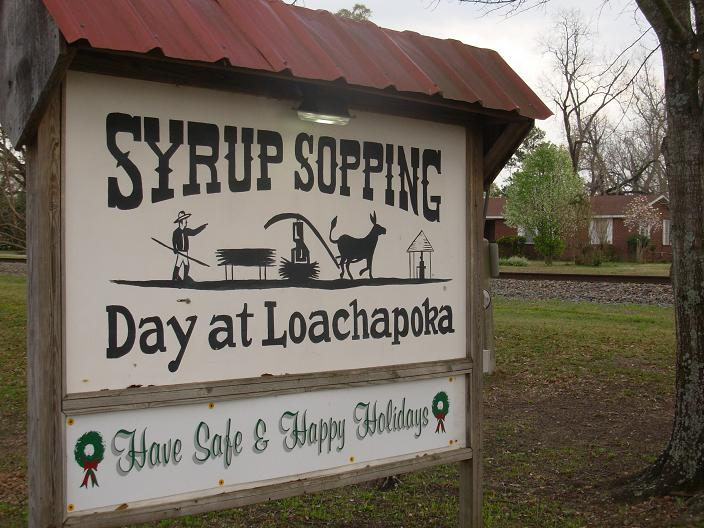
The famous Syrup Sopping sign as seen from Alabama State Route 14

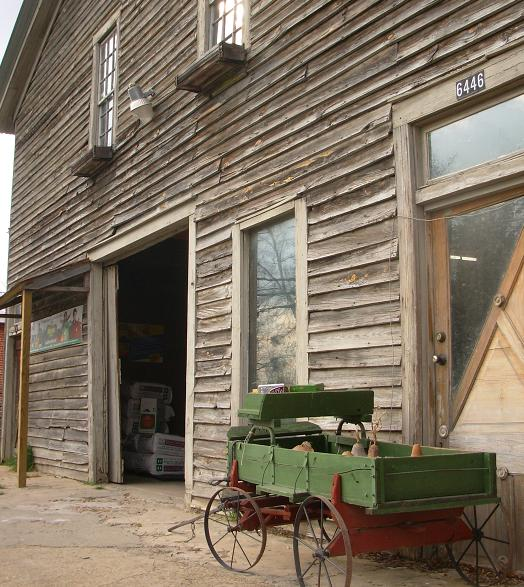
Fred's Feed & Seed, located in downtown Loachapoka, also serves as a music venue and "pickin' parlor." Fred's regularly features traditional barn dances on the first and third Thursdays of every month.

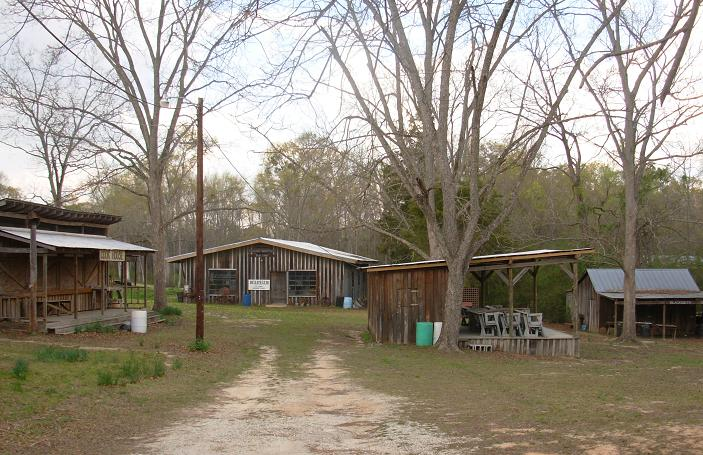
The Loachapoka Historic District was added to the National Register of Historic Places on May 11, 1973.

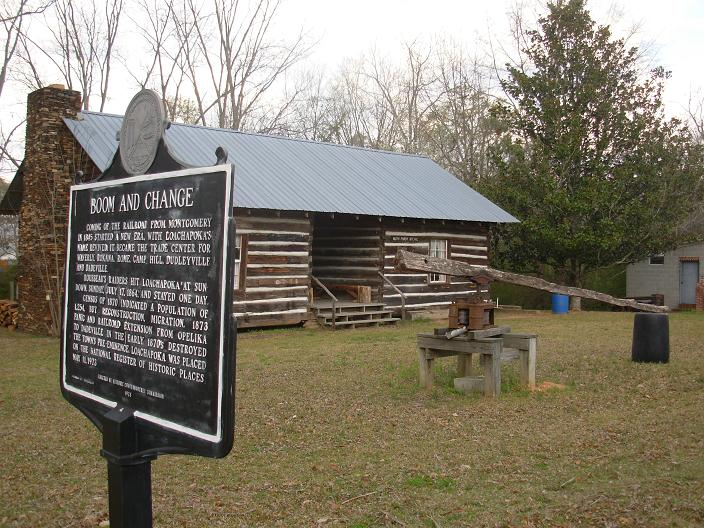
The Ruth Purdy Speake House and Historic Marker

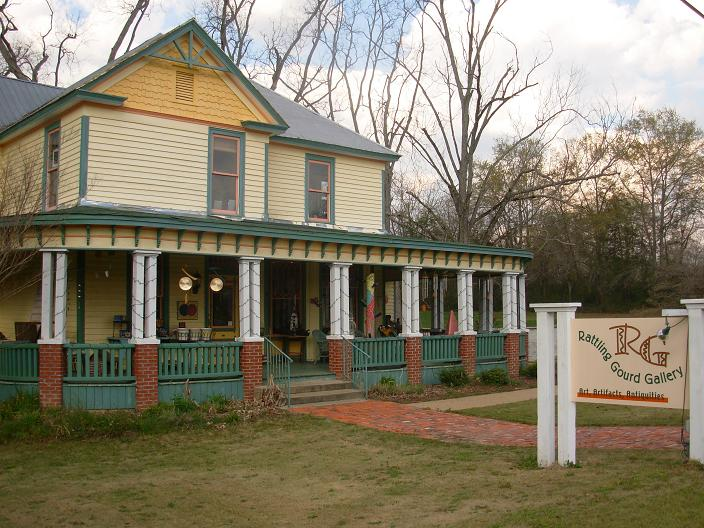
The now-defunct Rattling Gourd Gallery, Downtown Loachapoka

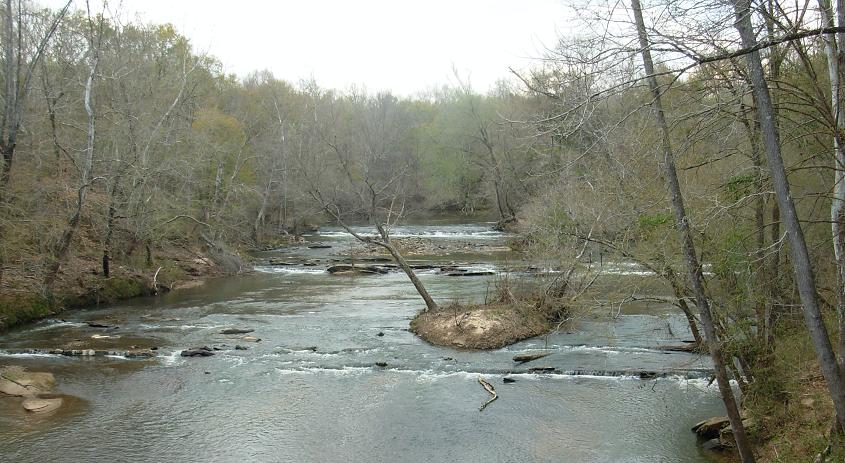
The Saugahatchee Creek, which runs through the area, serves as a popular swimming hole for locals during spring and summer.

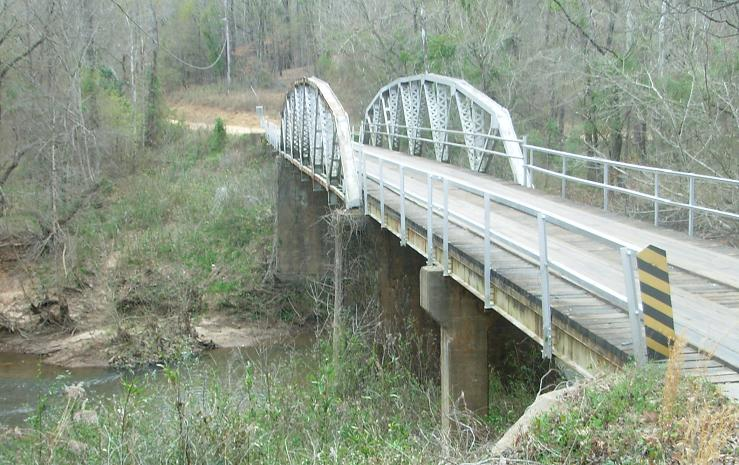
A span across the Saugahatchee Creek

== Demographics ==
Historical population
Census	Pop.	Note	%±
1880	408		—
1890	357		−12.5%
1930	360		—
1970	192		—
1980	335		74.5%
1990	259		−22.7%
2000	165		−36.3%
2010	180		9.1%
2020	160		−11.1%
U.S. Decennial Census; 2013 Estimate

Loachapoka has appeared sporadically on census records. It first appeared as a separate community on the 1880 U.S. Census and again in 1890. It did not appear in 1900–1920, although one source said it did incorporate in 1910 with 359 residents, but this is not corroborated by the census of that year. In 1930, it appeared again, citing it had been incorporated in 1926. However, it failed to appear again in 1940, presumably losing its charter during the 1930s. It did not reincorporate again until 1974.

=== 2020 census ===
Loachapoka town, Alabama – Racial and ethnic composition Note: the US Census treats Hispanic/Latino as an ethnic category. This table excludes Latinos from the racial categories and assigns them to a separate category. Hispanics/Latinos may be of any race.
Race / Ethnicity (NH = Non-Hispanic)	Pop 2000	Pop 2010	Pop 2020	% 2000	% 2010	% 2020
White alone (NH)	63	105	102	38.18%	58.33%	63.75%
Black or African American alone (NH)	100	67	42	60.61%	37.22%	26.25%
Native American or Alaska Native alone (NH)	0	0	0	0.00%	0.00%	0.00%
Asian alone (NH)	1	5	3	0.61%	2.78%	1.88%
Native Hawaiian or Pacific Islander alone (NH)	0	0	0	0.00%	0.00%	0.00%
Other race alone (NH)(NH)	0	0	0	0.00%	0.00%	0.00%
Multiracial (NH)	0	1	5	0.00%	0.56%	3.13%
Hispanic or Latino (any race)	1	2	8	0.61%	1.11%	5.00%
Total	165	180	160	100.00%	100.00%	100.00%

=== 2000 census ===
As of the 2000 census, 165 people, 69 households, and 46 families resided in the town. The population density was 140.2 inhabitants per square mile (54.1/km^{2}). The 77 housing units had an average density of 65.4 per square mile (25.3/km^{2}). The racial makeup of the town was 61.21% Black or African American, 38.18% White, and 0.61% Asian. About 0.61% of the population was Hispanic or Latino of any race.

Of the 69 households, 20.3% had children under 18 living with them, 37.7% were married couples living together, 18.8% had a female householder with no husband present, and 31.9% were not families. About 24.6% of all households were made up of individuals, and 10.1% had someone living alone who was 65 or older. The average household size was 2.39, and the average family size was 2.81.

In the town, the age distribution was 18.8% under 18, 14.5% from 18 to 24, 31.5% from 25 to 44, 21.8% from 45 to 64, and 13.3% who were 65 or older. The median age was 37 years. For every 100 females, there were 91.9 males. For every 100 females 18 and over, there were 97.1 males.

The median income in the town for a household was $30,938,and for a family was $33,571. Males had a median income of $28,750 versus $28,500 for females. The per capita income for the town was $14,477. About 9.5% of families and 16.3% of the population were below the poverty line, including 18.5% of those under 18 and 20.0% of those 65 or over.

== Notable person ==
- Freddie Hart, country music singer and songwriter
