= Beauregard High School =

Public high school in Beauregard, Alabama

Coordinates: 32.549743°N 85.373071°W

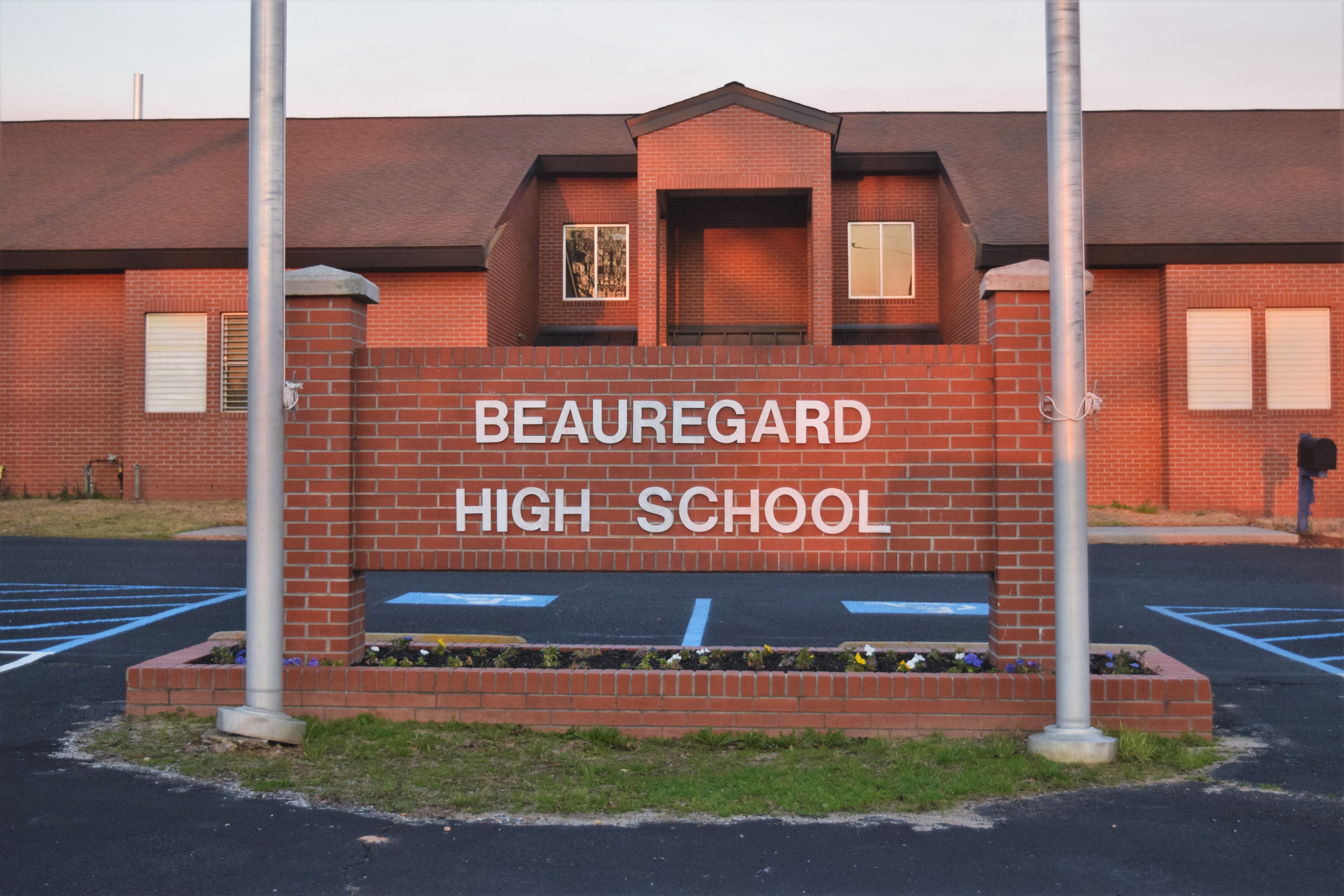
- Beauregard High School in 2021.

Location
- 7343 Alabama Highway 51; Beauregard, Alabama 36804; United States

Information
- School type: Public high school
- Founded: 1923
- School district: Lee County Schools
- Superintendent: Mike Howard
- CEEB code: 012050
- Principal: Richard Brown Jr.
- Staff: 44.00 (FTE)
- Grades: 9–12
- Enrollment: 558 (2023–2024)
- Student to teacher ratio: 12.68
- Language: English
- Colors: Royal blue, gold, and white
- Athletics conference: AHSAA Class 4A
- Mascot: Hornet
- Feeder schools: Sanford Middle School
- Website: bgh.lee.k12.al.us

Beauregard High School is a high school in Beauregard, Alabama, enrolling grades 9-12. The school enrolls approximately 550 students, and is one of four high schools in the Lee County School District along with Beulah, Loachapoka, and Smiths Station High Schools. Beauregard High School is named for Confederate Army general P.G.T. Beauregard.

== History ==
Beauregard High School was formed in 1923 as Whatley High School with the consolidation of several rural one-room schools in the area, including Whatley, Thompson, Hopewell, Hinson, Parker's Cross Road, and Dorsey Schools. By 1927, Whatley had absorbed Barron's Cross Road, Pleasant Grove, Sand Hill, Watoola, Pierce Chapel, and Marvyn Schools. This consolidated Whatley school served grades 1-11, with students wishing to finish high school attending Auburn High School seven miles northwest in Auburn. In 1927, Whatley school added the 12th grade and was accredited by the Southern Association of Colleges and Schools. A teacher at the school, Kate Grimmett Parker, requested in 1928 that the school's name be changed to "Beauregard High School", after Confederate General P.G.T. Beauregard. This name change was accepted, and the school quickly adopted the mascot of the hornet, after the "Hornet's Nest", a particularly vicious area of fighting of General Beauregard's troops in the Battle of Shiloh.

Until 1936, electricity at Beauregard High was supplied by a Delco-Light gas generator, and indoor plumbing was added in 1939. During the 1970-71 school year, Beauregard integrated with nearby Sanford High School, which led to the school being reconfigured from grades 1-12 to grades 1-3 and 10-12, with grades 4 and 9 added back to the school in subsequent years. By 1992, the secondary and elementary divisions were split, and today both Beauregard High School and Beauregard Elementary School share the same campus as separate schools. The high school and the elementary no longer share the same campus as of 2010. Also, they are the 2016 5A State Champions of Football. The track program has produced 5 State Championships. The boys were the 2008 AHSAA Class 4A Outdoor State Champions. The girls were the 2014 Classes 1A-4A Indoor Track State Champions. The girls were the 2014 Class 4A Outdoor Track & Field State Champions, along with the 2015 and 2017 Class 5A State Champions. The boys won the 2018 Class 5A Outdoor Track & Field State Championship. The girls Bowling team won the 2023 1A-5A State Championship. The football field is named in honor of former long-time Principal Richard L. Brown, Sr. The high school's track is named in honor of its former track coach Glenn Copeland.

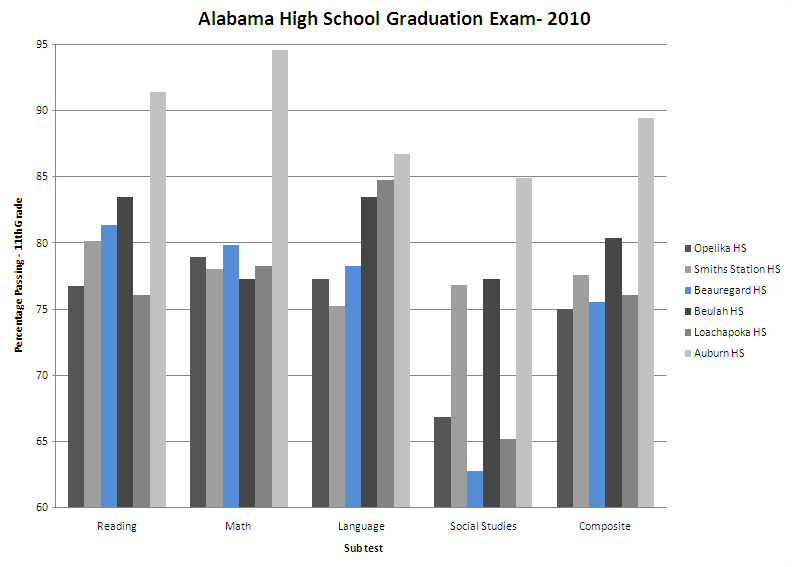
Chart showing composite test scores of Beauregard High School juniors in 2010 on the Alabama High School Graduation Exam, compared with juniors at the other public high schools in Lee County.

== Notable alumni ==
- La'Damian Webb – college football running back for the South Alabama Jaguars
- Lardarius Webb – NFL player, Baltimore Ravens
- Tom Whatley – Alabama State Senator (2010–2022)
