= Marvyn, Alabama =

Unincorporated community in Alabama, United States

- Unincorporated community
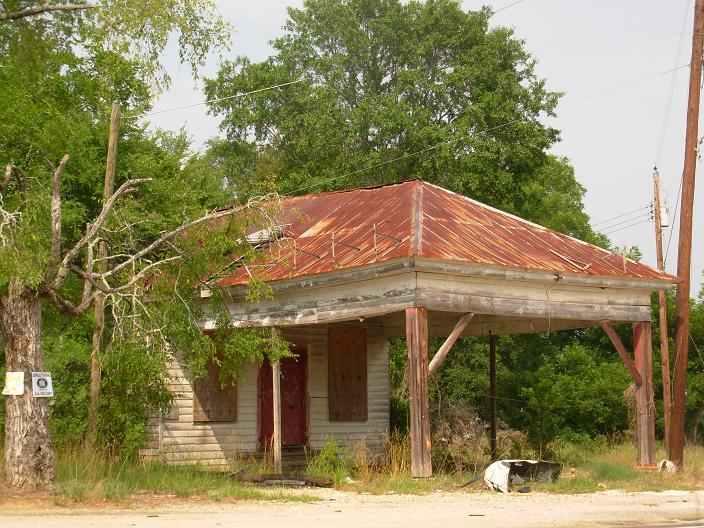
- Marvyn's abandoned service station located at the intersection of Alabama Highway 51 and U.S. Highway 80.

- Location within Alabama Location within the United States
- Coordinates: 32°26′21″N 85°21′51″W
- Country: United States
- State: Alabama
- County: Lee
- Elevation: 499 ft (152 m)
- Time zone: UTC-6 (CST)
  - Summer (DST): UTC-6 (EDT)
- GNIS feature ID: 122351

Marvyn, also spelled Marvin, is an unincorporated community located in southern Lee County, Alabama, United States. It sits at the crossroads of Alabama Highway 51 and U.S. Highway 80, and in the Lee County "panhandle" between Russell County and Macon County. It is part of the Columbus, Georgia-Alabama Metropolitan Area.

== History ==
Marvyn was originally located in Russell County, but was granted to Lee County in 1923 in exchange for Phenix City. A soil series is named after Marvyn, as it was first described in the area. The Marvyn soil series is described as a "fine-loamy, siliceous, thermic Typic Hapludults.

== Geography ==
Marvyn is located at the junction of U.S. Route 80 and Alabama State Route 51 in the southern part of the county. Via US-80, Phenix City is 22 mi (35 km) east, and Tuskegee is 22 mi (35 km) west. Via AL-51, Opelika, the county seat of Lee County, is 15 mi (24 km) north, and Hurtsboro is 15 mi (24 km) south.

== Demographics ==
Historical population
Census	Pop.	Note	%±
1880	241		—
U.S. Decennial Census

Marvyn appeared on the U.S. Census in 1880 with a population of 241 residents. At the time it was located in Russell County. This was the only time it was listed as a separate community in the census records.
