= Beauregard, Alabama =

Unincorporated community in Alabama, United States

- Unincorporated community
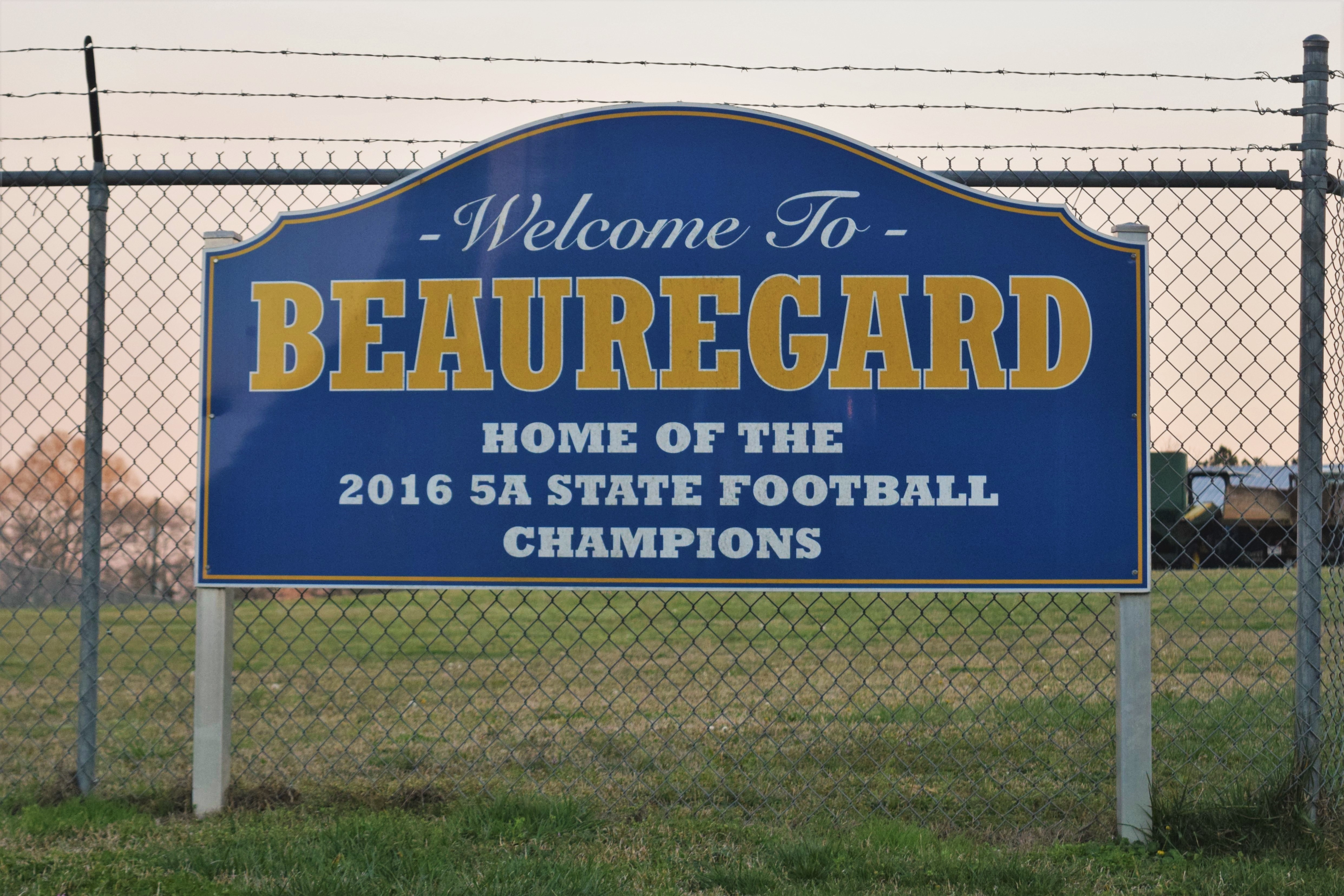
- Welcome to Beauregard sign in 2021

- Location within Alabama Location within the United States
- Coordinates: 32°32′35″N 85°22′15″W
- Country: United States
- State: Alabama
- County: Lee
- Named after: P.G.T. Beauregard
- Elevation: 630 ft (190 m)
- Time zone: UTC-6 (CST)
  - Summer (DST): UTC-5 (CDT)
- GNIS ID: 138110

Beauregard is an unincorporated community located in central Lee County, Alabama, United States. It is located east of Auburn and south of Opelika.

== History ==
Beauregard was settled in the late 19th century and was named for Confederate General P.G.T. Beauregard. There are also some unidentified ruins along Road 166 that sit behind the limestone quarry.

Several one-room schools were consolidated in 1923 to form Whatley School. Five years later, the school was renamed Beauregard. In 1970, Sanford School and Beauregard School were integrated to form Beauregard High School and Sanford Junior High.

== Geography ==
While Beauregard has been traditionally considered to be a small area near the crossroads of Alabama State Route 51 and Lee County Road 400, today most residents within a roughly 25 square mile (65 km^{2}) area surrounding the original community consider themselves to be in "Beauregard".

Via AL-51, Opelika, the Lee County seat, is 8 mi (13 km) north, and Marvyn is 8 mi (13 km) south.

=== Climate ===
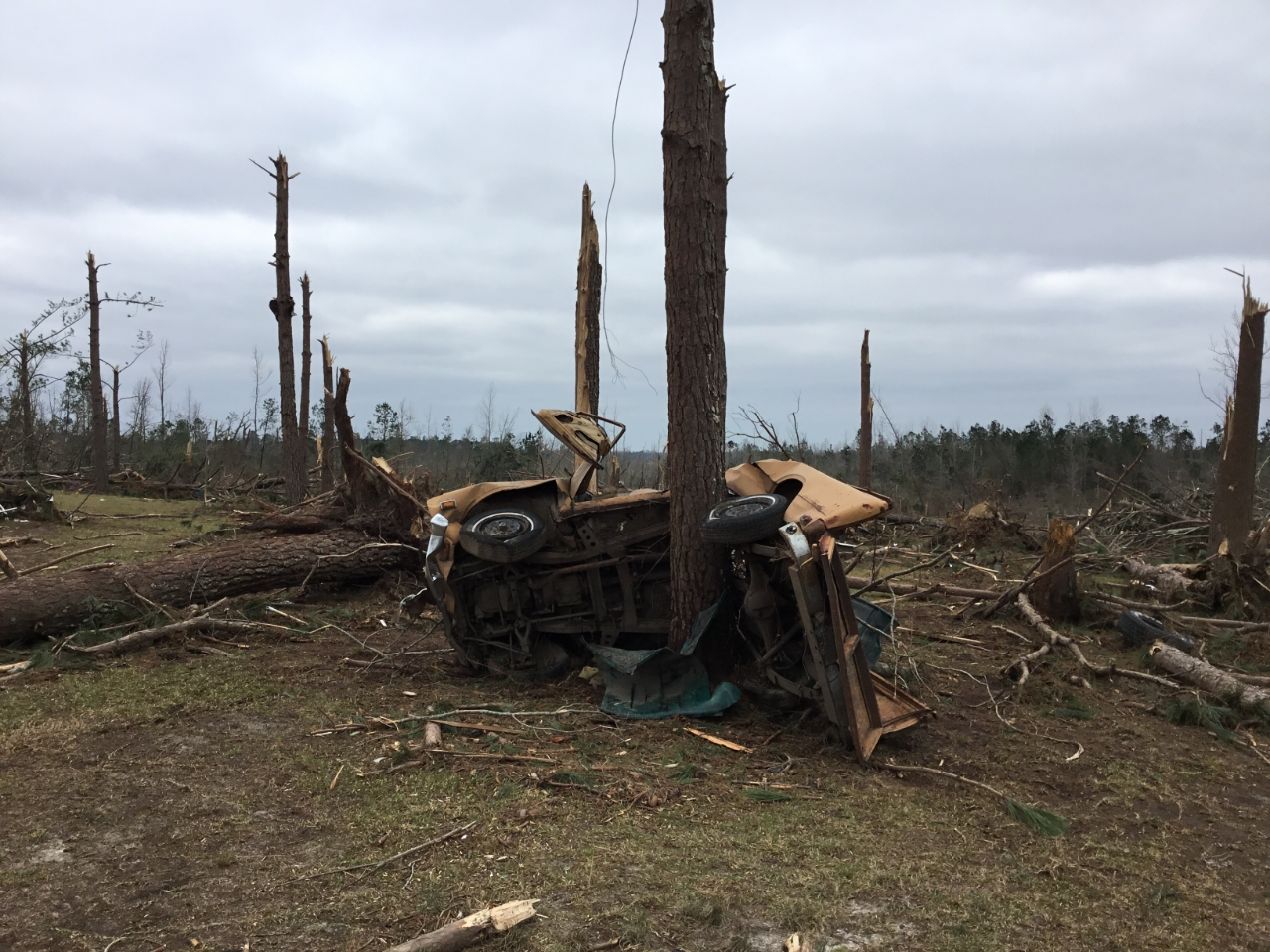
Car wrapped around a tree in Bauregard, AL

On March 3, 2019, Beauregard was hit by a long-tracked EF4 tornado. Many homes and businesses were severely damaged or destroyed. A remembrance monument is located at Providence Baptist Church in honor of the 23 people that were killed.

== Demographics ==
Beauregard is part of the Auburn Metropolitan Area. In 2020, Beauregard and Marvyn were included in the same county division for the census. They had a combined population of 12,605 people.

== Education ==
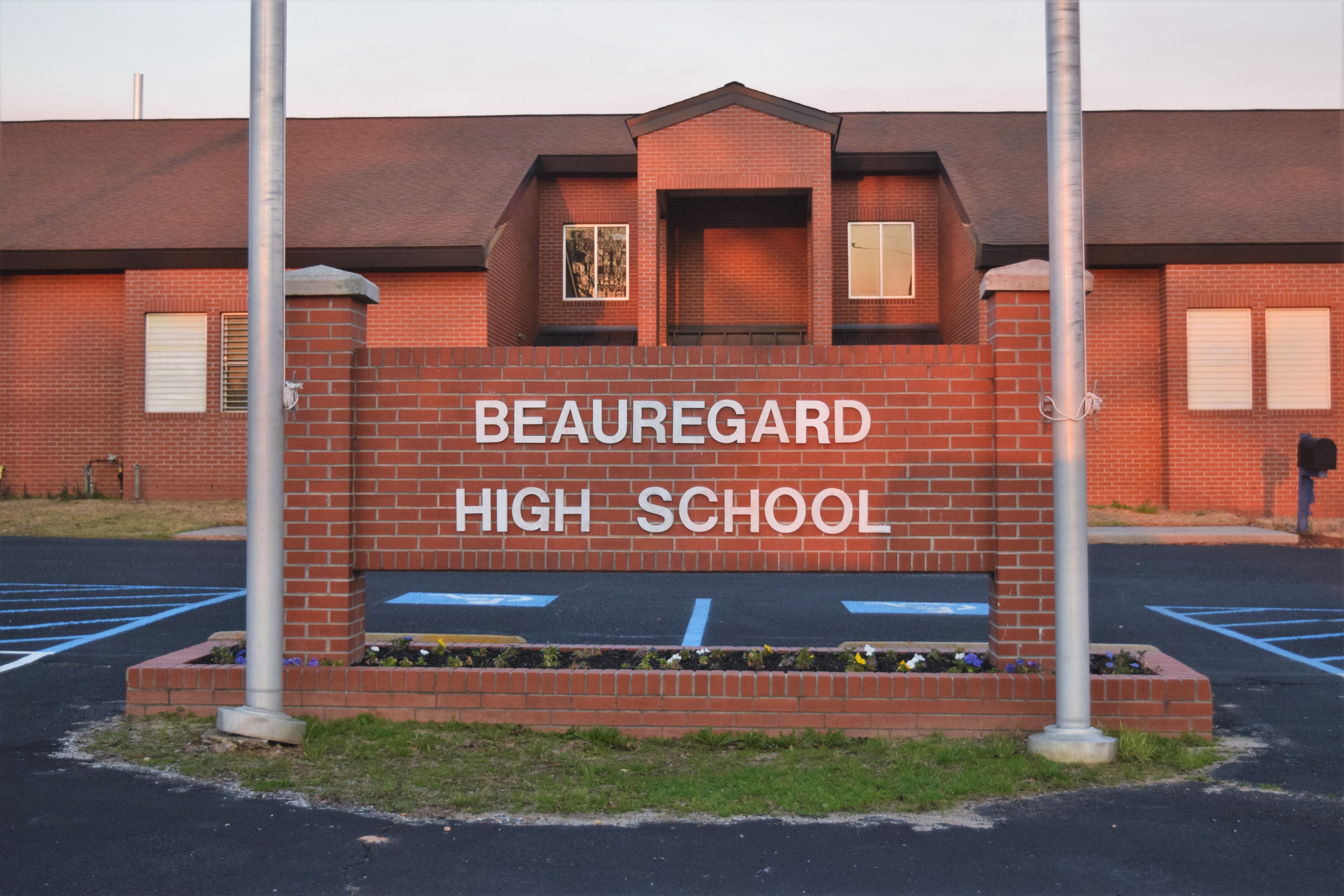
Beauregard High School

Schools

Beauregard has three public schools in the Lee County Schools system: Beauregard Elementary (K–4), Sanford Middle School (5–8), and Beauregard High School (9–12). In 2016, Beauregard High School became the Alabama 5A State Champions for football. The mascot of all three schools is the Hornet.

== Gallery ==
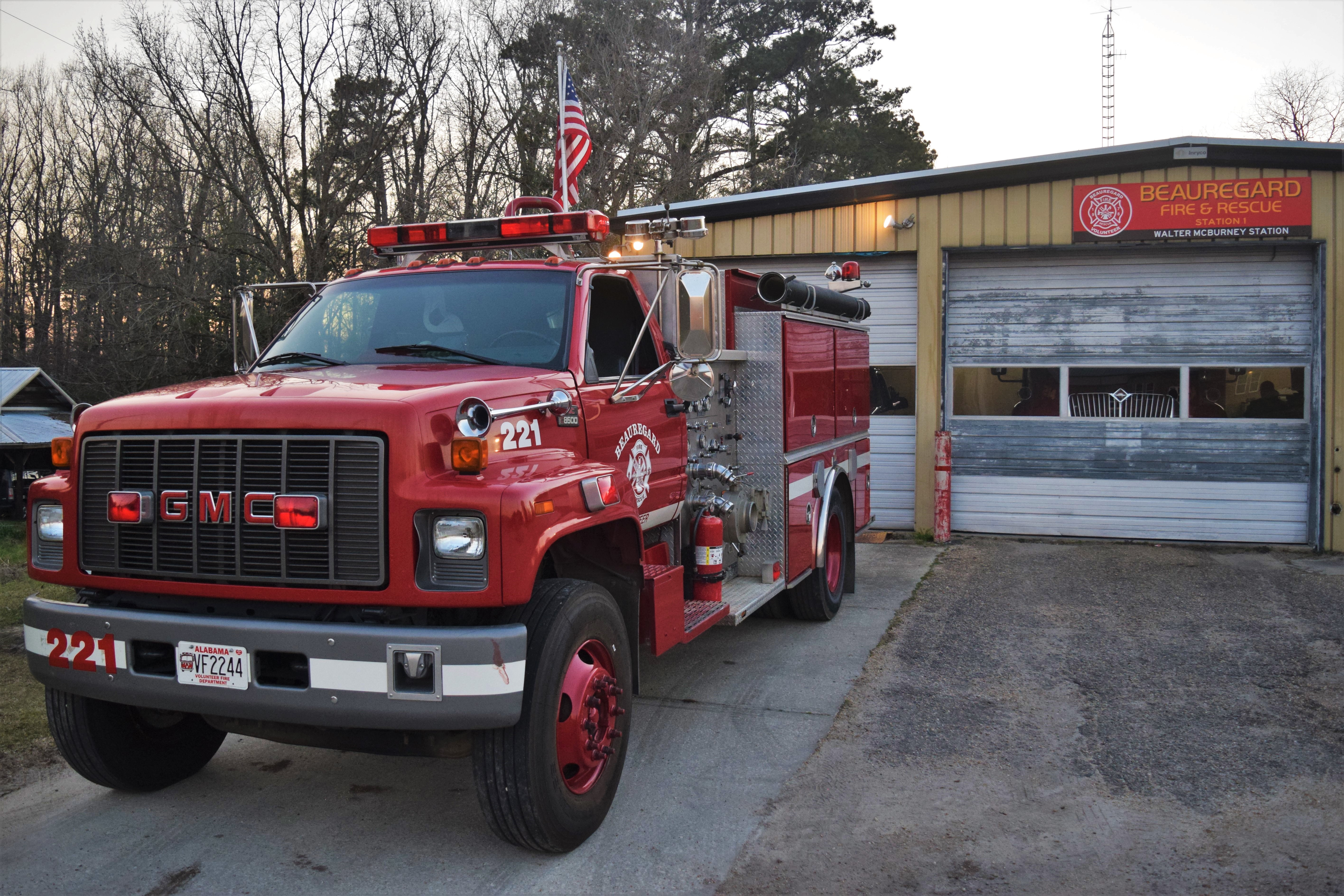
Beauregard Volunteer Fire Department
