= Beulah, Alabama =

Unincorporated community in Alabama, United States

- Unincorporated community
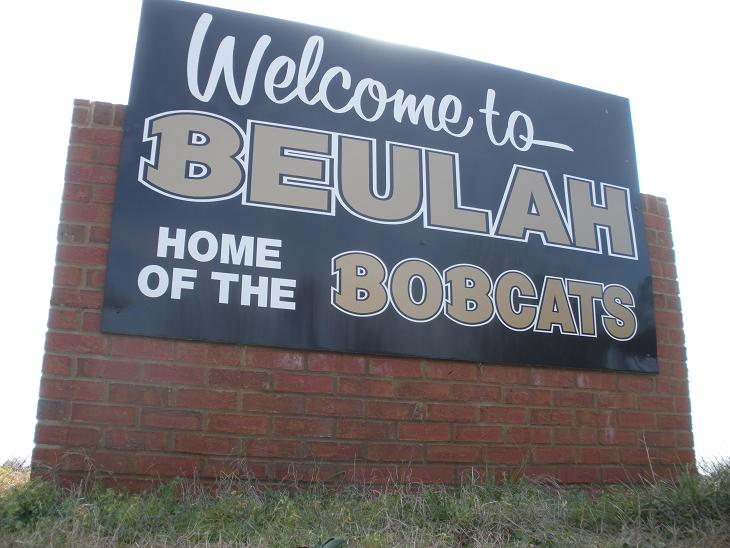

- Location within Alabama Location within the United States
- Coordinates: 32°42′40″N 85°10′56″W
- Country: United States
- State: Alabama
- Counties: Lee

Area
  - Total: 70.3 sq mi (182 km^{2})
- Elevation: 699 ft (213 m)

Population (July 2007)
  - Total: 6,173
  - Density: 88/sq mi (34/km^{2})
- Time zone: UTC-6 (CST)
  - Summer (DST): UTC-5 (CDT)
- GNIS feature ID: 114173

Beulah /ˈbjuːlə/ is an unincorporated community in the northeast corner of Lee County, Alabama, United States, just south of Valley. It is part of the Columbus, Georgia-Alabama Metropolitan Area. It is bounded by Chambers County on the north, the Chattahoochee River on the east, and the Halawaka Embayment of Lake Harding on the south.

== History ==
Beulah is named after Beulah Baptist Church, which was organized in 1851. A post office operated under the name Beulah from 1856 to 1906.

== Photo gallery ==
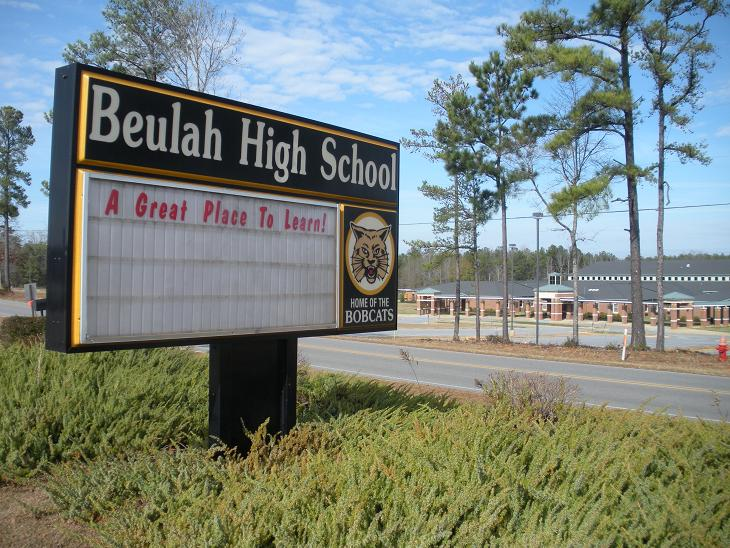
Beulah High School Sign with Beulah Elementary visible in the background

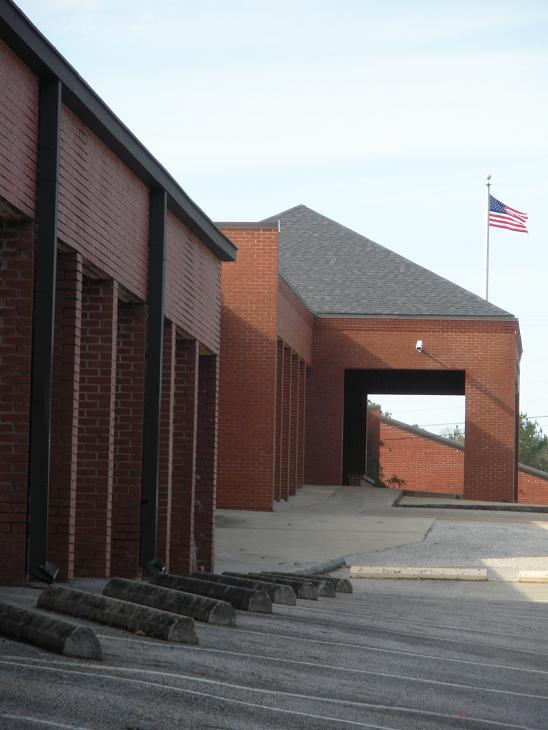
Beulah High School

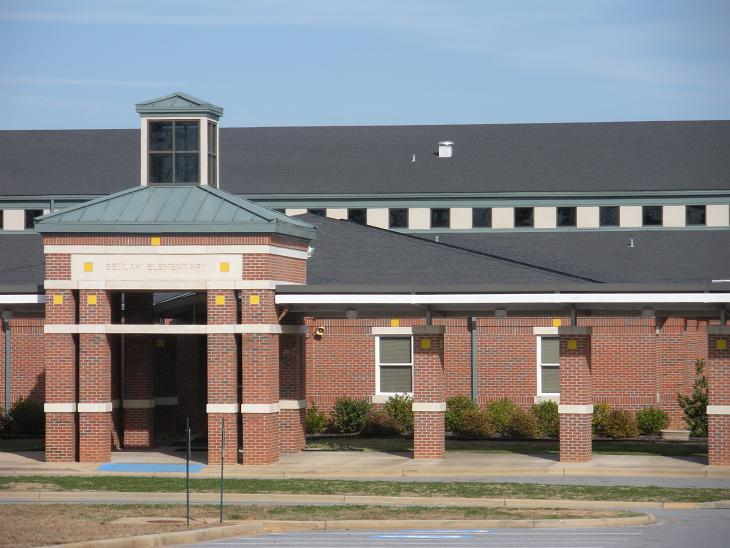
Beulah Elementary School

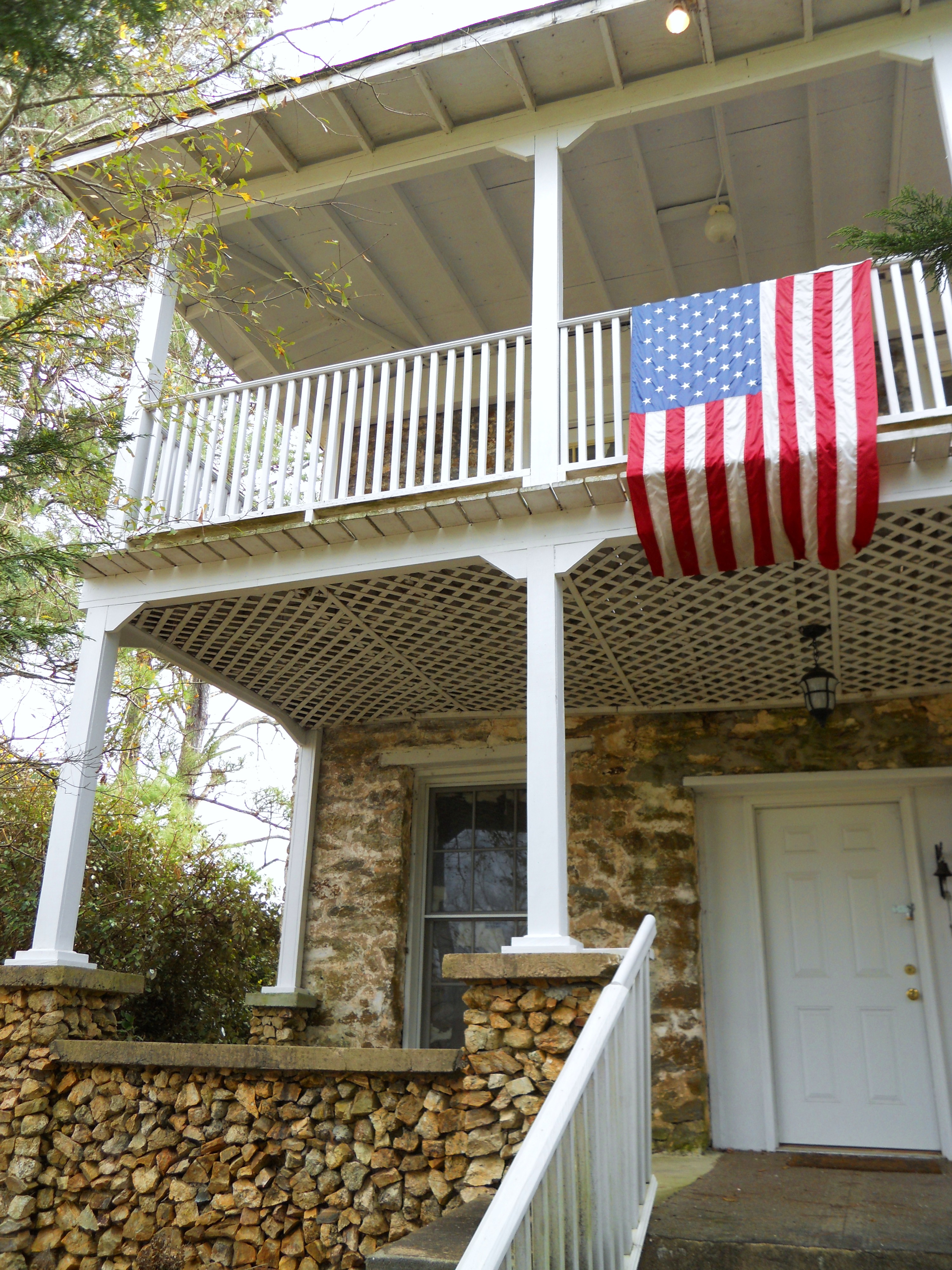
The Franklin Yarbrough, Jr. Store, also known as The Roger Brown Memorial Rock House Museum, is located in Beulah. It was added to the National Register of Historic Places on June 29, 1989.
