= 2022 Eastern Michigan Eagles football team =

American college football season

2022 Eastern Michigan Eagles football

MAC West Division co-champion Famous Idaho Potato Bowl champion

Famous Idaho Potato Bowl, W 41–27 vs. San Jose State
- Conference: Mid-American Conference
- West Division
- Record: 9–4 (5–3 MAC)
- Head coach: Chris Creighton (9th season)
- Offensive scheme: Multiple
- Defensive coordinator: Neal Neathery (7th season)
- Base defense: 4–2–5
- Home stadium: Rynearson Stadium

2022 Mid-American Conference football standings
	Conf.			Overall
Team	W		L	W		L
East Division
Ohio xy	7	–	1	10	–	4
Buffalo	5	–	3	7	–	6
Bowling Green	5	–	3	6	–	7
Miami (OH)	4	–	4	6	–	7
Kent State	4	–	4	5	–	7
Akron	1	–	7	2	–	10
West Division
Toledo xy$	5	–	3	9	–	5
Eastern Michigan x	5	–	3	9	–	4
Western Michigan	4	–	4	5	–	7
Ball State	3	–	5	5	–	7
Central Michigan	3	–	5	4	–	8
Northern Illinois	2	–	6	3	–	9
Championship: Toledo 17, Ohio 7
$ – Conference champion; x – Division champion/co-champions; y – Championship game participant; Rankings from AP Poll

The 2022 Eastern Michigan Eagles football team represented Eastern Michigan University during the 2022 NCAA Division I FBS football season. The Eagles were led by ninth-year head coach Chris Creighton and played their home games at Rynearson Stadium in Ypsilanti, Michigan. They competed as members of the West Division of the Mid-American Conference (MAC). By finishing the regular season at 8–4, the Eagles reached eight wins for the first time since winning a school-record ten games in 1987.

== Schedule ==
Date	Time	Opponent	Site	TV	Result	Attendance
September 2	7:00 p.m.	Eastern Kentucky*	Rynearson Stadium; Ypsilanti, MI	ESPN3	W 42–34	16,531
September 10	7:00 p.m.	at Louisiana*	Cajun Field; Lafayette, LA	NFLN	L 21–49	15,352
September 17	11:00 p.m.	at Arizona State*	Sun Devil Stadium; Tempe, AZ	P12N	W 30–21	43,788
September 24	12:00 p.m.	Buffalo	Rynearson Stadium; Ypsilanti, MI	CBSSN	L 31–50	14,524
October 1	2:00 p.m.	UMass*^{†}	Rynearson Stadium; Ypsilanti, MI	ESPN+	W 20–13	16,478
October 8	12:00 p.m.	at Western Michigan	Waldo Stadium; Kalamazoo, MI (Michigan MAC Trophy)	CBSSN	W 45–23	10,876
October 15	3:30 p.m.	Northern Illinois	Rynearson Stadium; Ypsilanti, MI	ESPN+	L 10–39	15,100
October 22	2:00 p.m.	at Ball State	Scheumann Stadium; Muncie, IN	ESPN+	W 20–16	15,698
October 29	12:00 p.m.	Toledo	Rynearson Stadium; Ypsilanti, MI	ESPNU	L 24–27	14,270
November 8	7:00 p.m.	at Akron	InfoCision Stadium–Summa Field; Akron, OH	CBSSN	W 34–28	12,589
November 16	6:00 p.m.	at Kent State	Dix Stadium; Kent, OH	ESPN2	W 31–24	3,998
November 25	12:00 p.m.	Central Michigan	Rynearson Stadium; Ypsilanti, MI (rivalry, Michigan MAC Trophy)	CBSSN	W 38–19	14,213
December 20	3:30 p.m.	vs. San Jose State*	Albertsons Stadium; Boise, ID (Famous Idaho Potato Bowl)	ESPN	W 41–27	10,122
*Non-conference game; ^{†}Homecoming; Rankings from AP Poll released prior to the game; All times are in Eastern time

== Game summaries ==
=== Eastern Kentucky ===
	1	2	3	4	Total
Colonels	0	10	7	17	34
Eagles	0	14	14	14	42

=== At Louisiana ===
Eastern Michigan Eagles (1–0) vs Louisiana Ragin' Cajuns (1–0) – Game summary

Quarter	1	2	3	4	Total
Eagles	7	7	7	0	21
Ragin' Cajuns	0	0	21	28	49

at Cajun Field • Lafayette, LA

- Date: September 10, 2022
- Game time: 6:04 pm
- Game weather: Mostly cloudy • Temperature: 86 °F (30 °C) • Wind: S 4 miles per hour (6.4 km/h)
- Game attendance: 18,079
- Referee: Greg Sujack
- TV announcers (NFL Network): Doug Sherman (play–by–play) and Tyoka Jackson (analyst)
- -

Game information
First quarter
- EMU – Aaron Jackson 3-yard pass from Samson Evans (Jesús Gómez kick), 8:29. EMU 7–0. Drive: 13 plays, 75 yards, 6:31.

Second quarter

- EMU – Tanner Knue 25-yard pass from Taylor Powell (Jesús Gómez kick), 0:05. EMU 14–0. Drive: 11 plays, 88 yards, 3:26.

Third quarter

- LA – Michael Jefferson 27-yard pass from Chandler Fields (Preston Stafford kick), 12:41. EMU 14–7. Drive: 2 plays, 27 yards, 0:11.
- LA – Johnny Lumpkin 1-yard pass from Chandler Fields (Preston Stafford kick), 9:14. TIED 14–14. Drive: 7 plays, 32 yards, 3:09.
- EMU – Darius Boone 1-yard rush (Jesús Gómez kick), 7:00. EMU 21–14. Drive: 5 plays, 82 yards, 2:08.
- LA – John Stephens Jr. 36-yard pass from Ben Wooldridge (Preston Stafford kick), 3:59. TIED 21–21. Drive: 7 plays, 75 yards, 3:01.

Fourth quarter

- LA – Chris Smith 20-yard rush (Kam Pedescleaux kick), 14:52. LA 28–21. Drive: 6 plays, 61 yards, 2:25.
- LA – Neal Johnson 19-yard pass from Chandler Fields (Preston Stafford kick), 11:15. LA 35–21. Drive: 7 plays, 43 yards, 3:18.
- LA – Pearse Migl 2-yard pass from Ben Wooldridge (Preston Stafford kick), 8:22. LA 42–21. Drive: 5 plays, 71 yards, 2:21.
- LA – Dre'lyn Washington 1-yard rush (Ben Wooldridge kick), 1:47. LA 49–21. Drive: 8 plays, 55 yards, 4:34.

Statistics	Eastern Michigan	Louisiana
First downs	23	23
Total yards	361	459
Rushing yards	41	149
Passing yards	320	310
Turnovers	5	0
Time of possession	29:35	30:25

Team	Category	Player	Statistics
Eastern Michigan	Passing	Taylor Powell	31/50, 317 yards, 1 TD, 3 INTs
Eastern Michigan	Rushing	Jaylon Jackson	5 carries, 37 yards
Eastern Michigan	Receiving	Tanner Knue	8 receptions, 89 yards, 1 TD
Louisiana	Passing	Ben Wooldridge	12/13, 169 yards, 2 TDs
Louisiana	Rushing	Dre'lyn Washington	8 carries, 45 yards, 1 TD
Louisiana	Receiving	John Stephens Jr.	3 receptions, 103 yards, 1 TD

=== At Arizona State ===
Eastern Michigan Eagles (1–1) vs Arizona State Sun Devils (1–1) – Game summary

Quarter	1	2	3	4	Total
Eagles	10	14	3	3	30
Sun Devils	0	14	0	7	21

at Sun Devil Stadium • Tempe, AZ

- Date: September 17, 2022
- Game time: 8:10 pm
- Game weather: Clear, 96 °F (36 °C)
- Game attendance: 43,788
- Referee: Matthew Richards
- TV announcers (P12N): JB Long, Bob Davie
- -

Game information
First quarter
- EMU – Jesús Gómez 27-yard field goal, 11:04. EMU 3–0. Drive: 12 plays, 56 yards, 3:56.
- EMU – Jaylon Jackson 4-yard run (Jesús Gómez kick), 3:18. EMU 10–0. Drive: 11 plays, 80 yards, 5:37.

Second quarter

- ASU – Andre Johnson 3-yard pass from Emory Jones (Carter Brown kick), 14:54. EMU 10–7. Drive: 3 plays, 22 yards, 0:35.
- EMU – Hassan Beydoun 6-yard pass from Austin Smith (Jesús Gómez kick), 8:11. EMU 17–7. Drive: 13 plays, 75 yards, 6:43.
- ASU – Emory Jones 3-yard run (Carter Brown kick), 2:53. EMU 17–14. Drive: 11 plays, 75 yards, 5:18.
- EMU – Samson Evans 3-yard run (Jesús Gómez kick), 1:12. EMU 24–14. Drive: 8 plays, 79 yards, 1:41.

Third quarter

- EMU – Jesús Gómez 40-yard field goal, 7:04. EMU 27–14. Drive: 7 plays, 39 yards, 2:41.

Fourth quarter

- ASU – Xazavian Valladay 44-yard run (Carter Brown kick), 10:48. EMU 27–21. Drive: 5 plays, 80 yards, 1:34.
- EMU – Jesús Gómez 20-yard field goal, 4:24. EMU 30–21. Drive: 9 plays, 73 yards, 5:44.

Statistics	Eastern Michigan	Arizona State
First downs	25	18
Plays–yards	73–458	55–352
Rushes–yards	51–305	23–170
Passing yards	153	182
Passing: comp–att–int	14–22–1	20–32
Time of possession	34:43	25:17

Team	Category	Player	Statistics
Eastern Michigan	Passing	Taylor Powell	10/14, 93 yards, 1 INT
Eastern Michigan	Rushing	Samson Evans	36 carries, 258 yards, 1 TD
Eastern Michigan	Receiving	Tanner Knue	3 receptions, 53 yards
Arizona State	Passing	Emory Jones	20/32, 182 yards, 1 TD
Arizona State	Rushing	Xazavian Valladay	16 carries, 127 yards, 1 TD
Arizona State	Receiving	Elijhah Badger	7 receptions, 88 yards

=== Buffalo ===
	1	2	3	4	Total
Bulls	13	17	10	10	50
Eagles	14	10	7	0	31

=== UMass ===
	1	2	3	4	Total
Minutemen	7	3	3	0	13
Eagles	0	0	14	6	20

=== At Western Michigan ===
	1	2	3	4	Total
Eagles	14	21	7	3	45
Broncos	0	7	9	7	23

=== Northern Illinois ===
	1	2	3	4	Total
Huskies	14	6	9	10	39
Eagles	7	0	3	0	10

=== At Ball State ===
	1	2	3	4	Total
Eagles	0	10	0	10	20
Cardinals	0	7	9	0	16

=== Toledo ===
	1	2	3	4	Total
Rockets	0	10	7	10	27
Eagles	7	10	7	0	24

=== At Akron ===
	1	2	3	4	Total
Eagles	10	14	7	3	34
Zips	7	7	0	14	28

=== At Kent State ===
	1	2	3	4	Total
Eagles	7	0	10	14	31
Golden Flashes	7	10	0	7	24

=== Central Michigan ===
	1	2	3	4	Total
Chippewas	7	6	0	6	19
Eagles	14	0	14	10	38

=== Vs. San Jose State (Famous Idaho Potato Bowl) ===
	1	2	3	4	Total
Eagles	9	21	11	0	41
Spartans	13	0	7	7	27

== After the season ==
The following Eagles were selected in the 2023 NFL draft after the season.

Round	Pick	Player	Position	NFL club
4	117	Sidy Sow	Guard	New England Patriots
6	196	Jose Ramirez	Linebacker	Tampa Bay Buccaneers
