= Samson Evans =

American football player (born 1999)

No. 22
- Position: Running back

Personal information
- Born: October 15, 1999 (age 27)
- Listed height: 6 ft 0 in (1.83 m)
- Listed weight: 217 lb (98 kg)

Career information
- High school: Prairie Ridge (Crystal Lake, Illinois)
- College: Iowa (2018–2019); Eastern Michigan (2020–2023)

Awards and highlights
- Second-team All-MAC (2022)
- Stats at ESPN

Samson Joseph Evans (born October 15, 1999) is an American former college football running back who played for the Eastern Michigan Eagles.

== Early life ==
Evans attended Prairie Ridge High School in Crystal Lake, Illinois, and played running back and quarterback on the football team. As a senior, he completed 24 of his 52 passes for 609 yards and eight touchdowns, while rushing for 2,092 yards and 38 touchdowns, and returning two punts for touchdowns. Evans committed to play college football at the University of Iowa over other schools such as Illinois, Indiana, Iowa State, Minnesota, and Syracuse.

== College career ==
=== Iowa ===
Evans redshirted two season at Iowa before deciding to enter the NCAA transfer portal.

=== Eastern Michigan ===
Evans transferred to Eastern Michigan. In week 5 of the 2020 season, he rushed for 61 yards and his first career touchdown in a 53–42 win over Western Michigan. Evans finished the 2020 season with 202 yards and a touchdown on 41 carries, while also bringing in six receptions for 46 yards. In the 2021 season opener he rushed for 11 yards and three touchdowns in a 35–15 win over Saint Francis. In week 10, Evans rushed for 62 yards and two touchdowns in a 34–26 loss to Ohio. He finished the 2021 season with 316 yards and 13 touchdowns on 83 carries, while also catching 19 passes for 107 yards.

Evans had a hot start to the 2022 season, rushing for 89 yards and two touchdown, as he helped Eastern Michigan beat Eastern Kentucky 42–34. In week 3, he rushed for a school record 258 yards and a touchdown in a 30–21 win over Arizona State, and was named the MAC offensive player of the week. In week 6, Evans rushed for 90 yards and three touchdowns in a 45–23 win over Western Michigan. In week 8, he rushed for 88 yards and three touchdowns in a 24–21 defeat to Toledo. The next week, Evans rushed 24 times for 133 yards and two touchdowns in a 34–28 win over Akron. In Eastern Michigan's season finale, he rushed for 135 yards and a touchdown, while also bringing in two receptions for 14 yards, as he helped the Eagles beat Central Michigan 38–19. For his performance, Evans was again named the MAC offensive player of the week, after becoming the Eagles all-time rushing touchdowns leader. In the 2022 Famous Idaho Potato Bowl, he rushed for 82 yards and two touchdowns to help the Eagles end their season with a 41–27 victory against San Jose State. Evans finished his 2022 season with 1,166 yards and 15 touchdowns on 249 carries, while also hauling in 15 receptions for 93 yards, and throwing a three-yard pass for a touchdown. He earned second-team all-MAC honors. Evans was named a preseason first-team all-MAC ahead of the 2023 season. He was also named to watchlists of multiple awards, such as the Doak Walker Award, the Maxwell Award, and the Walter Camp Award.

== Professional career ==
Pre-draft measurables
Height	Weight	Arm length	Hand span	40-yard dash	10-yard split	20-yard split	20-yard shuttle	Three-cone drill	Vertical jump	Broad jump	Bench press
6 ft 0 in (1.83 m)	215 lb (98 kg)	31 in (0.79 m)	9 1/2 in (0.24 m)	4.80 s	1.61 s	2.76 s	4.44 s	7.06 s	33.5 in (0.85 m)	9 ft 7 in (2.92 m)	15 reps
All values from Pro Day
