= 2022 Miami RedHawks football team =

American college football season

2022 Miami RedHawks football

Bahamas Bowl, L 20–24 vs. UAB
- Conference: Mid-American Conference
- East Division
- Record: 6–7 (4–4 MAC)
- Head coach: Chuck Martin (9th season)
- Offensive coordinator: Eric Koehler (9th season)
- Offensive scheme: Multiple
- Defensive coordinator: Bill Brechin (1st season)
- Base defense: Multiple
- Home stadium: Yager Stadium

2022 Mid-American Conference football standings
	Conf.			Overall
Team	W		L	W		L
East Division
Ohio xy	7	–	1	10	–	4
Buffalo	5	–	3	7	–	6
Bowling Green	5	–	3	6	–	7
Miami (OH)	4	–	4	6	–	7
Kent State	4	–	4	5	–	7
Akron	1	–	7	2	–	10
West Division
Toledo xy$	5	–	3	9	–	5
Eastern Michigan x	5	–	3	9	–	4
Western Michigan	4	–	4	5	–	7
Ball State	3	–	5	5	–	7
Central Michigan	3	–	5	4	–	8
Northern Illinois	2	–	6	3	–	9
Championship: Toledo 17, Ohio 7
$ – Conference champion; x – Division champion/co-champions; y – Championship game participant; Rankings from AP Poll

The 2022 Miami RedHawks football team represented Miami University as a member of the East Division of the Mid-American Conference (MAC) during the 2022 NCAA Division I FBS football season. They were led by ninth-year head coach Chuck Martin and played their home games at Yager Stadium in Oxford, Ohio.

== Preseason ==
=== MAC media day ===
The Mid-American Conference media day was held on July 26, 2022 at House of Blues in Cleveland. The RedHawks were predicted to finish in first place in the East Division in the Mid-American preseason poll.

== Roster ==
2022 Miami RedHawks football team roster
Players
Coaches
Offense

Pos.	#	Name	Class
WR	0	Mac Hippenhammer	Sr
RB	1	Jaylon Bester	Sr
QB	2	Aveon Smith	Fr
RB	3	Keyon Mozee	So
QB	4	Ben Tarpey	So
QB	5	Brett Gabbert	Jr
WR	6	Austin Robinson	So
RB	8	Kevin Davis	So
RB	9	Tyre Shelton	Jr
QB	10	Zane Ries	Sr
WR	11	Javon Tracy	Fr
QB	12	Henry Hesson	Fr
WR	13	Miles Marshall	Jr
WR	14	Jalen Walker	Sr
QB	16	Orin Edwards	Fr
QB	17	Joseph Humphreys	Fr
WR	18	Jeremiah Batiste	Fr
QB	19	Matt MacLeod	Fr
WR	20	Sam Barry	Fr
DB, WR	22	Christian Schomer	Fr
RB	23	Nate Milanowski	Fr
RB	24	Darez Snider	Fr
RB	24	Danny Dunlap	Fr
WR	25	Devon Dorsey	So
RB	26	Jordan Brunson	Fr
WR	29	James Besett	So
WR	84	Reggie Virgil	Fr

Defense

Pos.	#	Name	Class
DL	0	Austin Ertl	Jr
DB	1	Devin Johnson	Fr
DB	2	Yahsyn McKee	Jr
DB	3	Nolan Johnson	Jr
LB	4	Camden Rogers	Fr
DB	5	John Saunders Jr.	So
DB	6	Jacquez Warren	So
DL	8	Brian Ugwu	Jr
LB	10	Ty Wise	So
DL	11	Corey Suttle	So
LB	12	Corban Hondru	Fr
LB	15	Matt Salopek	So
DB	16	Eli Blakey	Fr
DB	17	TJ Rush	Fr
DB	18	Rowan Zolman	Fr
DB	19	Ambe' Caldwell	So
LB	20	Adam Trick	Fr
DB	21	Michael Dowell	Jr
DB	22	Ja'Von Kimpson	So
LB	23	Oscar McWood	Fr
LB	26	Eli Coppess	Fr
DB	27	Dee Pierce	Fr
DB	28	Caleb Tubbs	Fr
DB	29	Silas Walters	Fr
DL	52	Nasir Washington	Fr

Special teams

Pos.	#	Name	Class
K	98	Graham Nicholson	So

Head coach

- Chuck Martin

Coordinators/assistant coaches

- Eric Koehler – Offensive coordinator
- Bill Brechin – Defensive coordinator
- Jacob Bronowski – Special teams coordinator
- James Patton – Running backs
- Myles White – Wide receivers
- Pat Welsh – Tight ends
- James Patton – Offensive line
- Joe Bowen – Linebackers
- Robert Blanton – Cornerbacks
- Ed Warinner – Graduate assistant
- Brock LaBar – Graduate assistant
- Pete Nank – Graduate assistant

Legend

- (C) Team captain
- (S) Suspended
- (I) Ineligible
- Injured
- Redshirt

Roster
Last update: November 14, 2023

== Schedule ==
Date	Time	Opponent	Site	TV	Result	Attendance
September 3	7:00 p.m.	at No. 20 Kentucky*	Kroger Field; Lexington, KY	ESPN+/SECN+	L 13–37	61,139
September 10	6:00 p.m.	Robert Morris*	Yager Stadium; Oxford, OH	ESPN3	W 31–14	9,828
September 17	12:00 p.m.	vs. Cincinnati*	Paycor Stadium; Cincinnati, OH (Victory Bell)	ESPNU	L 17–38	30,109
September 24	7:30 p.m.	at Northwestern*	Ryan Field; Evanston, IL	BTN	W 17–14	23,773
October 1	3:30 p.m.	at Buffalo	University at Buffalo Stadium; Amherst, NY	ESPNU	L 20–24	18,615
October 8	3:30 p.m.	Kent State^{†}	Yager Stadium; Oxford, OH	ESPN+	W 27–24	14,366
October 15	12:00 p.m.	at Bowling Green	Doyt Perry Stadium; Bowling Green, OH	ESPN+	L 13–17	7,841
October 22	3:30 p.m.	Western Michigan	Yager Stadium; Oxford, OH	CBSSN	L 10–16	21,618
October 29	12:00 p.m.	at Akron	InfoCision Stadium–Summa Field; Akron, OH	ESPN+	W 27–9	11,749
November 8	7:30 p.m.	Ohio	Yager Stadium; Oxford, OH (Battle of the Bricks)	ESPN2	L 21–37	15,490
November 16	7:00 p.m.	at Northern Illinois	Huskie Stadium; DeKalb, IL	CBSSN	W 29–23	5,187
November 22	7:00 p.m.	Ball State	Yager Stadium; Oxford, OH	ESPN+	W 18–17	14,021
December 16	11:30 a.m.	vs. UAB*	Thomas Robinson Stadium; Nassau, Bahamas (Bahamas Bowl)	ESPN	L 20–24	12,172
*Non-conference game; ^{†}Homecoming; Rankings from AP Poll released prior to the game; All times are in Eastern time; Source:

== Games summaries ==
=== At Kentucky ===
	1	2	3	4	Total
RedHawks	7	3	3	0	13
Wildcats	7	6	17	7	37

=== Robert Morris ===
	1	2	3	4	Total
Colonials	7	0	0	7	14
RedHawks	10	14	0	7	31

=== Cincinnati ===
	1	2	3	4	Total
Bearcats	7	17	7	7	38
RedHawks	10	7	0	0	17

=== At Northwestern ===
	1	2	3	4	Total
RedHawks	0	7	0	10	17
Wildcats	7	0	0	7	14

=== At Buffalo ===
	1	2	3	4	Total
RedHawks	7	3	10	0	20
Bulls	7	7	3	7	24

=== Kent State ===
	1	2	3	4	Total
Golden Flashes	0	7	7	10	24
RedHawks	17	0	10	0	27

=== At Bowling Green ===
	1	2	3	4	Total
Falcons	0	7	3	7	17
RedHawks	3	7	3	0	13

=== Western Michigan ===
	1	2	3	4	Total
Broncos	0	6	10	0	16
RedHawks	3	0	0	7	10

=== At Akron ===
	1	2	3	4	Total
RedHawks	7	10	0	10	27
Zips	0	3	0	6	9

=== Ohio ===
	1	2	3	4	Total
Bobcats	7	3	14	13	37
RedHawks	0	7	7	7	21

=== At Northern Illinois ===
	1	2	3	4	Total
RedHawks	2	14	10	3	29
Huskies	10	0	13	0	23

=== Ball State ===
	1	2	3	4	Total
Cardinals	7	7	3	0	17
RedHawks	0	3	3	12	18

=== UAB (Bahamas Bowl) ===
	1	2	3	4	Total
RedHawks	0	6	7	7	20
Blazers	10	0	0	14	24
