= Nic Jones (American football) =

American football player (born 2001)

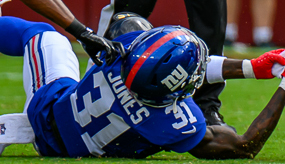
- Jones in 2025

No. 31 – New York Giants
- Position: Cornerback
- Roster status: Active

Personal information
- Born: October 15, 2001 (age 25); Detroit, Michigan, U.S.
- Listed height: 6 ft 0 in (1.83 m)
- Listed weight: 189 lb (86 kg)

Career information
- High school: Southfield (Southfield, Michigan)
- College: Ball State (2019–2022)
- NFL draft: 2023: 7th round, 250th overall pick

Career history
- Kansas City Chiefs (2023–2024); New York Giants (2025–present)

Awards and highlights
- Super Bowl champion (LVIII); Second-team All-MAC (2022)

Career NFL statistics as of 2025
- Total tackles: 12
- Pass deflections: 1
- Stats at Pro Football Reference

Nicholas Jones (born October 15, 2001) is an American professional football cornerback for the New York Giants of the National Football League (NFL). He played college football for the Ball State Cardinals.

== Early life and college ==
Jones was born on October 15, 2001, and grew up in Detroit, Michigan. He is the third-youngest of four children. He attended Southfield High School and played two years of varsity football, being ranked a three-star recruit before committing to Ball State.

As a true freshman at Ball State, Jones totaled 18 tackles with four pass breakups while appearing in 12 games, two of which he started. The following year, he played in eight games, starting one, and made six tackles as well as one blocked punt on special teams. He became a full-time starter as a junior in 2021, but suffered a season-ending knee injury six games in. Jones finished the season with 13 tackles, one interception and a pass breakup.

Jones stayed healthy for his senior season, finishing the year a second-team All-Mid-American Conference (MAC) selection after posting 22 tackles, 12 pass breakups and two interceptions. He was invited to the East–West Shrine Bowl and to the NFL Scouting Combine.

== Professional career ==
Pre-draft measurables
Height	Weight	Arm length	Hand span	Wingspan	40-yard dash	10-yard split	20-yard split	20-yard shuttle	Vertical jump	Broad jump	Bench press
5 ft 11 7/8 in (1.83 m)	189 lb (86 kg)	32 3/8 in (0.82 m)	10 in (0.25 m)	6 ft 4 3/4 in (1.95 m)	4.51 s	1.57 s	2.57 s	4.31 s	35.0 in (0.89 m)	10 ft 2 in (3.10 m)	9 reps
All values from NFL Combine/Pro Day

=== Kansas City Chiefs ===
Jones was selected in the seventh round (250th overall) of the 2023 NFL draft by the Kansas City Chiefs. He made the team's final roster and saw his first playing time in their Week 4 win over the New York Jets. As a rookie, he appeared in nine regular season games and all four of the Chiefs' postseason games. Jones ended his rookie season as a Super Bowl champion when the Chiefs defeated the San Francisco 49ers in Super Bowl LVIII.

Jones was waived by the Chiefs on August 28, 2024, and re-signed to the practice squad.

=== New York Giants ===
Jones signed with the New York Giants on February 14, 2025. He made 13 appearances for the Giants, recording one pass deflection and eight combined tackles. On December 13, Jones was placed on injured reserve after undergoing season-ending shoulder surgery.
