= 2022 Kent State Golden Flashes football team =

American college football season

2022 Kent State Golden Flashes football
- Conference: Mid-American Conference
- East Division
- Record: 5–7 (4–4 MAC)
- Head coach: Sean Lewis (5th season)
- Offensive coordinator: Andrew Sowder (5th season)
- Offensive scheme: Veer and shoot
- Defensive coordinator: Jeremiah Johnson (1st season)
- Base defense: 3–4
- Home stadium: Dix Stadium

2022 Mid-American Conference football standings
	Conf.			Overall
Team	W		L	W		L
East Division
Ohio xy	7	–	1	10	–	4
Buffalo	5	–	3	7	–	6
Bowling Green	5	–	3	6	–	7
Miami (OH)	4	–	4	6	–	7
Kent State	4	–	4	5	–	7
Akron	1	–	7	2	–	10
West Division
Toledo xy$	5	–	3	9	–	5
Eastern Michigan x	5	–	3	9	–	4
Western Michigan	4	–	4	5	–	7
Ball State	3	–	5	5	–	7
Central Michigan	3	–	5	4	–	8
Northern Illinois	2	–	6	3	–	9
Championship: Toledo 17, Ohio 7
$ – Conference champion; x – Division champion/co-champions; y – Championship game participant; Rankings from AP Poll

The 2022 Kent State Golden Flashes football team represented Kent State University in the 2022 NCAA Division I FBS football season. They were led by fifth-year head coach Sean Lewis and play their home games at Dix Stadium in Kent, Ohio, as members of the East Division of the Mid-American Conference.

== Schedule ==
Date	Time	Opponent	Site	TV	Result	Attendance
September 3	10:30 p.m.	at Washington*	Husky Stadium; Seattle, WA	FS1	L 20–45	56,112
September 10	7:00 p.m.	at No. 7 Oklahoma*	Gaylord Family Oklahoma Memorial Stadium; Norman, OK	ESPN+	L 3–33	83,911
September 17	12:00 p.m.	LIU* (FCS)	Dix Stadium; Kent, OH	ESPN3	W 63–10	15,452
September 24	12:00 p.m.	at No. 1 Georgia*	Sanford Stadium; Athens, GA	ESPN+, SECN+	L 22–39	92,746
October 1	3:30 p.m.	Ohio^{†}	Dix Stadium; Kent, OH	ESPN+	W 31–24 ^{OT}	20,392
October 8	3:30 p.m.	at Miami (OH)	Yager Stadium; Oxford, OH	ESPN+	L 24–27	14,366
October 15	3:30 p.m.	at Toledo	Glass Bowl; Toledo, OH	ESPN+	L 31–52	19,139
October 22	12:00 p.m.	Akron	Dix Stadium; Kent, OH (Wagon Wheel)	ESPN+	W 33–27	20,472
November 1	7:00 p.m.	Ball State	Dix Stadium; Kent, OH	ESPNU	L 20–27	6,455
November 9	7:00 p.m.	at Bowling Green	Doyt Perry Stadium; Bowling Green, OH (Anniversary Award)	CBSSN	W 40–6	7,291
November 16	6:00 p.m.	Eastern Michigan	Dix Stadium; Kent, OH	ESPN2	L 24–31	3,998
November 26	1:00 p.m.	at Buffalo	University at Buffalo Stadium; Amherst, NY	ESPN+	W 30–27 ^{OT}	12,302
*Non-conference game; ^{†}Homecoming; Rankings from AP Poll released prior to the game; All times are in Eastern time

== Game summaries ==
=== At Washington ===
Kent State Golden Flashes (0–0) at Washington Huskies (0–0) – Game summary

Quarter	1	2	3	4	Total
Golden Flashes	7	6	0	7	20
Huskies	21	10	7	7	45

at Husky Stadium • Seattle, Washington

- Date: September 3, 2022
- Game time: 10:30 p.m. EST
- Game weather: 70 °F (21 °C); Overcast;
- Game attendance: 56,112
- Referee: John Love
- TV announcers (FS1): Alex Faust (Play-By-Play), Petros Papadakis (Analyst)

Game information

First quarter

- (12:50) WASH – Wayne Taulapapa 28-yard run, Peyton Henry kick (Drive: 4 plays, 37 yards, 1:54; Washington 7–0)
- (5:25) WASH – Taj Davis 32-yard pass from Michael Penix Jr., Peyton Henry kick (Drive: 10 plays, 90 yards, 4:17; Washington 14–0)
- (5:08) KENT – Devontez Walker 47-yard pass from Collin Schlee, Andrew Glass kick (Drive: 1 plays, 47 yards, 0:09; Washington 14–7)
- (1:18) WASH – Cameron Davis 1-yard run, Peyton Henry kick (Drive: 10 plays, 75 yards, 3:44; Washington 21–7)

Second quarter

- (8:28) WASH – Rome Odunze 4-yard pass from Michael Penix Jr., Peyton Henry kick (Drive: 10 plays, 83 yards, 5:23; Washington 28–7)
- (4:48) KENT – Andrew Glass 42-yard field goal (Drive: 10 plays, 50 yards, 3:40; Washington 28–10)
- (2:56) KENT – Andrew Glass 39-yard field goal (Drive: 5 plays, 13 yards, 1:41; Washington 28–13)
- (0:24) WASH – Peyton Henry 38-yard field goal (Drive: 11 plays, 52 yards, 2:27; Washington 31–13)

Third quarter

- (9:06) WASH – Jalen McMillan 13-yard pass from Michael Penix Jr., Peyton Henry kick (Drive: 13 plays, 74 yards, 5:47; Washington 38–13)

Fourth quarter

- (13:12) KENT – Marquez Cooper 22-yard run, Andrew Glass kick (Drive: 10 plays, 55 yards, 2:59; Washington 38–20)
- (11:50) WASH – Jalen McMillan 10-yard pass from Michael Penix Jr., Peyton Henry kick (Drive: 4 plays, 55 yards, 1:22; Washington 45–20)

Statistics	KENT	WASH
First downs	19	29
Plays–yards	68–340	78–525
Rushes–yards	39–147	34–142
Passing yards	193	393
Passing: comp–att–int	14–29–3	29–44–0
Time of possession	27:21	32:39

Team	Category	Player	Statistics
Kent State	Passing	Collin Schlee	12/24, 178 yards, TD, 2 INT
Kent State	Rushing	Collin Schlee	8 carries, 47 yards
Kent State	Receiving	Dante Cephas	6 receptions, 105 yards
Washington	Passing	Michael Penix Jr.	26/39, 345 yards, 4 TD
Washington	Rushing	Wayne Taulapapa	11 carries, 57 yards, TD
Washington	Receiving	Jalen McMillan	5 receptions, 87 yards, 2 TD

=== At No. 7 Oklahoma ===
Kent State Golden Flashes (0–1) at No. 7 Oklahoma Sooners (1–0) – Game summary

Quarter	1	2	3	4	Total
Golden Flashes	0	3	0	0	3
No. 7 Sooners	0	7	24	2	33

at Gaylord Family Oklahoma Memorial Stadium • Norman, Oklahoma

- Date: September 10, 2022
- Game time: 7:00 p.m. EST
- Game weather: Sunny Temperature: 87 °F (31 °C)
- Game attendance: 83,911
- Referee: Steve Baron
- TV announcers (ESPN+): Mike Morgan (play-by-play), Ryan Leaf (analyst) & Alex Chappell (sideline)

Game information

First quarter

- No Score

Second quarter

- (8:27) KEST – Andrew Glass 37 yard FG (Drive: 15 plays, 72 yards, 7:21; KEST 3–0)
- (0:18) OKLA – Dillon Gabriel 36 yard pass to Marvin Mims, Zach Schmit kick (Drive: 5 plays, 76 yards, 00:52; OKLA 7–3)

Third quarter

- (12:41) OKLA – Marcus Major 16 yards rush, Zach Schmit kick (Drive: 7 plays, 68 yards, 2:13; OKLA 14–3)
- (9:51) OKLA – Zach Schmit 25 yard FG (Drive: 7 plays, 26 yards, 1:39; OKLA 17–3)
- (5:31) OKLA - Dillon Gabriel 18 yards pass to Drake Stoops, Zach Schmit kick (Drive: 4 plays, 80 yards, 00:58; OKLA 24–3)
- (1:35) OKLA - Dillon Gabriel 58 yard pass to Marvin Mims, Zach Schmit kick (Drive: 3 plays, 82 yards, 00:33; OKLA 31–3)

Fourth quarter

- (12:00) OKLA – Safety (OKLA 33–3)

Statistics	KEST	OKLA
First downs	20	20
Total yards	295	430
Rushes/yards	52/164	36/134
Passing yards	131	296
Passing: Comp–Att–Int	11–21–1	21–28
Time of possession	36:19	23:41

Team	Category	Player	Statistics
Kent State	Passing	Collin Schlee	11/19, 131 yards
Kent State	Rushing	Marquez Cooper	22 carries, 55 yards
Kent State	Receiving	Dante Cephas	4 receptions, 50 yards
Oklahoma	Passing	Dillon Gabriel	21/28, 296 yards, 3 TD's
Oklahoma	Rushing	Eric Gray	10 carries, 71 yards
Oklahoma	Receiving	Marvin Mims	7 receptions, 163 yards, 2 TD's

=== Long Island ===
	1	2	3	4	Total
Sharks	7	3	0	0	10
Golden Flashes	7	28	14	14	63

=== At No. 1 Georgia ===
	1	2	3	4	Total
Golden Flashes	3	10	3	6	22
No. 1 Bulldogs	12	14	6	7	39

=== Ohio ===
Ohio Bobcats (2–2, 0–0) vs. Kent State Golden Flashes (1–3, 0–0)

Quarter	1	2	3	4	OT	Total
Ohio	0	10	7	7	0	24
Kent State	7	0	3	14	7	31

at Dix Stadium • Kent, OH

- Date: Saturday, October 1, 2022
- Game time: 3:30 p.m. EDT
- Game weather: cloudy, Temperature:62 °F (17 °C)
- Game attendance: 20,392
- Referee: David Siegle
- TV announcers (ESPN+): Michael Reghi, Ryan Cavanaugh
- box score, Ohio notes

Game information

First Quarter

- (11:30 KENT) – Cooper, Marquez 3 yd run (Glass, Andrew kick) 6 plays, 90 yards, TOP 01:41 (KENT 7–0)

Second Quarter

- (11:47 OHIO) – McCormick, Nolan 6 yd pass from Rourke, Kurtis (Vakos, Nathanial kick) 13 plays, 80 yards, TOP 05:29 (Tied 7–7)
- (03:46 OHIO) – Vakos, Nathanial 28 yd field goal 10 plays, 59 yards, TOP 06:02 (OHIO 10–7)

Third Quarter

- (09:51 KENT) – Glass, Andrew 50 yd field goal 8 plays, 37 yards, TOP 02:27 (Tied 10–10)
- (00:47 OHIO) – Bangura, Sieh 50 yd run (Vakos, Nathanial kick) 3 plays, 70 yards, TOP 01:38 (OHIO 17–10)

Fourth Quarter

- (04:11 KENT) – Cephas, Dante 29 yd pass from Schlee, Collin (Glass, Andrew kick) 8 plays, 90 yards, TOP 02:46 (Tied 17–17)
- (03:54 OHIO) – Wiglusz, Sam 71 yd pass from Rourke, Kurtis (Vakos, Nathanial kick) 1 plays, 71 yards, TOP 00:12 (OHIO 24–17)
- (01:44 KENT) – Schlee, Collin 2 yd run (Glass, Andrew kick) 8 plays, 75 yards, TOP 02:10 (Tied 24–24)

Overtime

- (00:00 KENT) – Cooper, Marquez 1 yd run (Glass, Andrew kick) 4 plays, 25 yards, TOP 00:00 (KENT 31–24)

Statistics	OHIO	KENT
First downs	19	36
Total yards	450	736
Rushes/yards	30/128	59/338
Passing yards	322	398
Passing: Comp–Att–Int	25–39–0	24–37–0
Time of possession	30:06	29:54

Team	Category	Player	Statistics
Ohio	Passing	Kurtis Rourke	25/39, 322 yards, 2 TD
Ohio	Rushing	Sieh Bangura	18 rushes, 99 yards, 1 TD
Ohio	Receiving	Sam Wiglusz	6 receptions, 115 yards, 1 TD
Kent State	Passing	Collin Schlee	24/37, 398 yards, 1 TD
Kent State	Rushing	Marquez Cooper	40 rushes, 240 yards, 2 TD
Kent State	Receiving	Dante Cephas	13 receptions, 246 yards, 1 TD

=== At Miami (OH) ===
	1	2	3	4	Total
Golden Flashes	0	7	7	10	24
RedHawks	17	0	10	0	27

=== At Toledo ===
	1	2	3	4	Total
Golden Flashes	21	10	0	0	31
Rockets	7	21	10	14	52

=== Akron ===
	1	2	3	4	Total
Zips	7	10	7	3	27
Golden Flashes	0	21	9	3	33

=== Ball State ===
	1	2	3	4	Total
Cardinals	0	17	3	7	27
Golden Flashes	13	0	0	7	20

=== At Bowling Green ===
	1	2	3	4	Total
Golden Flashes	0	20	3	17	40
Falcons	0	0	6	0	6

=== Eastern Michigan ===
	1	2	3	4	Total
Eagles	7	0	10	14	31
Golden Flashes	7	10	0	7	24

=== At Buffalo ===
	1	2	3	4	OT	Total
Golden Flashes	3	7	0	14	6	30
Bulls	3	7	14	0	3	27
