= 2022 Bowling Green Falcons football team =

American college football season

2022 Bowling Green Falcons football

Quick Lane Bowl, L 19–24 vs. New Mexico State
- Conference: Mid-American Conference
- East Division
- Record: 6–7 (5–3 MAC)
- Head coach: Scot Loeffler (4th season)
- Co-offensive coordinators: Max Warner (1st season); Greg Nosal (1st season)
- Offensive scheme: Pro spread
- Defensive coordinator: Eric Lewis (2nd season)
- Base defense: 4–3 or 4–2–5
- Home stadium: Doyt Perry Stadium

2022 Mid-American Conference football standings
	Conf.			Overall
Team	W		L	W		L
East Division
Ohio xy	7	–	1	10	–	4
Buffalo	5	–	3	7	–	6
Bowling Green	5	–	3	6	–	7
Miami (OH)	4	–	4	6	–	7
Kent State	4	–	4	5	–	7
Akron	1	–	7	2	–	10
West Division
Toledo xy$	5	–	3	9	–	5
Eastern Michigan x	5	–	3	9	–	4
Western Michigan	4	–	4	5	–	7
Ball State	3	–	5	5	–	7
Central Michigan	3	–	5	4	–	8
Northern Illinois	2	–	6	3	–	9
Championship: Toledo 17, Ohio 7
$ – Conference champion; x – Division champion/co-champions; y – Championship game participant; Rankings from AP Poll

The 2022 Bowling Green Falcons football team represented Bowling Green State University during the 2022 NCAA Division I FBS football season. The Falcons were led by fourth-year head coach Scot Loeffler and played their home games at Doyt Perry Stadium in Bowling Green, Ohio. They competed as members of the East Division of the Mid-American Conference (MAC).

This was also the Falcons' first season to qualify for a bowl game since 2015.

== Schedule ==
Date	Time	Opponent	Site	TV	Result	Attendance
September 3	2:30 p.m.	at UCLA*	Rose Bowl; Pasadena, CA	P12N	L 17–45	27,143
September 10	4:00 p.m.	Eastern Kentucky*	Doyt Perry Stadium; Bowling Green, OH	ESPN3	L 57–59 ^{7OT}	17,376
September 17	5:00 p.m.	Marshall*	Doyt Perry Stadium; Bowling Green, OH	NFLN	W 34–31 ^{OT}	21,158
September 24	12:00 p.m.	at Mississippi State*	Davis Wade Stadium; Starkville, MS	SECN	L 14–45	48,376
October 1	3:30 p.m.	at Akron	InfoCision Stadium–Summa Field; Akron, OH	ESPN+	W 31–28	8,093
October 8	12:00 p.m.	Buffalo	Doyt Perry Stadium; Bowling Green, OH	ESPN+	L 7–38	8,724
October 15	12:00 p.m.	Miami (OH)	Doyt Perry Stadium; Bowling Green, OH	ESPN+	W 17–13	7,841
October 22	1:00 p.m.	at Central Michigan	Kelly/Shorts Stadium; Mount Pleasant, MI	ESPN3	W 34–18	14,676
November 2	7:00 p.m.	Western Michigan	Doyt Perry Stadium; Bowling Green, OH	ESPN2	W 13–9	7,589
November 9	7:00 p.m.	Kent State	Doyt Perry Stadium; Bowling Green, OH (Anniversary Award)	CBSSN	L 6–40	7,291
November 15	7:00 p.m.	at Toledo	Glass Bowl; Toledo, OH (rivalry)	ESPNU	W 42–35	20,027
November 22	7:00 p.m.	at Ohio	Peden Stadium; Athens, OH	ESPNU	L 14–38	11,693
December 26	1:30 p.m.	vs. New Mexico State*	Ford Field; Detroit, MI (Quick Lane Bowl)	ESPN	L 19–24	22,987
*Non-conference game; Rankings from AP Poll released prior to the game; All times are in Eastern time

== Game summaries ==
=== At UCLA ===
Bowling Green Falcons (0-0) vs UCLA Bruins (0-0) – Game summary

Quarter	1	2	3	4	Total
Falcons	10	7	0	0	17
Bruins	7	17	7	14	45

at Rose Bowl • Pasadena, CA

- Date: September 3, 2022
- Game time: 11:30 a.m.
- Game weather: Sunny, 101 °F (38 °C)
- Game attendance: 27,143
- Referee: Mike McCabe
- TV announcers (Pac-12 Network): Roxy Bernstein (play-by-play), Lincoln Kennedy (analyst)

Game information

First Quarter

- (13:46) BGSU – Charles Rosser 11-yard return of blocked punt, Mason Lawler kick (Drive: 4 plays, -2 yards, 1:14; Bowling Green 7–0)
- (12:20) UCLA – Dorian Thompson-Robinson 68-yard run, Nicholas Barr-Mira kick (Drive: 3 plays, 75 yards, 1:26; Tied 7–7)
- (4:29) BGSU – Mason Lawler 24-yard field goal (Drive: 4 plays, 5 yards, 1:13; Bowling Green 14–7)

Second Quarter

- (13:43) BGSU – Christian Sims 22-yard pass from Matt McDonald, Mason Lawler kick (Drive: 8 plays, 73 yards, 2:31; Bowling Green 17–7)
- (8:28) UCLA – Nicholas Barr-Mira 24-yard field goal (Drive: 10 plays, 59 yards, 5:15; Bowling Green 17–10)
- (4:04) UCLA – Kazmeir Allen 20-yard pass from Dorian Thompson-Robinson, Nicholas Barr-Mira kick (Drive: 8 plays, 61 yards, 2:58; Tied 17–17)
- (2:18) UCLA – Keegan Jones 52-yard pass from Dorian Thompson-Robinson, Nicholas Barr-Mira kick (Drive: 1 plays, 52 yards, 0:00; UCLA 24–17)

Third Quarter

- (11:03) UCLA – Zach Charbonnet 4-yard run, Nicholas Barr-Mira kick (Drive: 8 plays, 58 yards, 2:20; UCLA 31–17)

Fourth Quarter

- (14:54) UCLA – Dorian Thompson-Robinson 8-yard run, Nicholas Barr-Mira kick (Drive: 9 plays, 47 yards, 2:45; UCLA 38–17)
- (4:21) UCLA – Josiah Norwood 50-yard pass from Ethan Garbers, Nicholas Barr-Mira kick (Drive: 7 plays, 68 yards, 2:44; UCLA 45–17)

Statistics	BGSU	UCLA
First downs	9	29
Total yards	162	626
Rushes/yards	25–37	45–269
Passing yards	125	357
Passing: Comp–Att–Int	17–36–0	35–47–1
Time of possession	25:12	34:48

Team	Category	Player	Statistics
Bowling Green	Passing	Matt McDonald	17/34, 125 yards, TD
Bowling Green	Rushing	Jamal Johnson	10 carries, 45 yards
Bowling Green	Receiving	Christian Sims	4 receptions, 33 yards, TD
UCLA	Passing	Dorian Thompson-Robinson	32/43, 298 yards, 2 TD, INT
UCLA	Rushing	Zach Charbonnet	21 carries, 111 yards, TD
UCLA	Receiving	Kazmeir Allen	10 receptions, 85 yards, TD

=== Eastern Kentucky ===
Eastern Kentucky Colonels (0–1) at Bowling Green Falcons (0–1) – Game summary

Quarter	1	2	3	4	OT	2OT	3OT	4OT	5OT	6OT	7OT	Total
Colonels	0	24	7	7	7	6	2	2	0	2	2	59
Falcons	10	7	7	14	7	6	2	2	0	2	0	57

at Doyt Perry Stadium • Bowling Green, OH

- Date: Saturday, September 10, 2022
- Game time: 4:00 p.m. EDT
- Game weather: Sunny • Temperature: 82 °F (28 °C) • Wind: S 10 mph
- Game attendance: 17,376
- Referee: Ron Hudson
- TV announcers (ESPN3): Jim Barbar (play-by-play), Randy Buffington (analyst)

Game information

First quarter

- (10:59) BGSU – Mason Lawler 45-yard field goal (Drive: 9 plays, 36 yards, 3:57; Bowling Green 3–0)
- (1:43) BGSU – CJ Lewis 26-yard pass from Matt McDonald (Mason Lawler kick) (Drive: 8 plays, 60 yards, 3:24; Bowling Green 10–0)

Second quarter

- (7:52) EKU – Jayden Higgins 6-yard pass from Parker McKinney (Patrick Nations kick) (Drive: 8 plays, 80 yards, 3:37; Bowling Green 10–7)
- (5:39) BGSU – Matt McDonald 31-yard run (Mason Lawler kick) (Drive: 6 plays, 75 yards, 2:13; Bowling Green 17–7)
- (2:12) EKU – Patrick Nations 24-yard field goal (Drive: 9 plays, 70 yards, 3:20; Bowling Green 17–10)
- (1:41) EKU – Jayden Bost fumble recovery in endzone (Patrick Nations kick) (Tied 17–17)
- (:13) EKU – Braedon Sloan 15-yard run (Mason Lawler kick) (Drive: 6 plays, 44 yards, :43; Eastern Kentucky 24–17)

Third quarter

- (7:44) EKU – Cornelius McCoy 2-yard pass from Parker McKinney (Patrick Nations kick) (Drive: 12 plays, 82 yards, 4:33; Eastern Kentucky 31–17)
- (5:49) BGSU – CJ Lewis 34-yard pass from Matt McDonald (Mason Lawler kick) (Drive: 6 plays, 83 yards, 1:47; Eastern Kentucky 31–24)

Fourth quarter

- (8:55) BGSU – Tyrone Broden 20-yard pass from Matt McDonald (Mason Lawler kick) (Drive: 7 plays, 53 yards, 3:14; Tied 31–31)
- (3:39) BGSU – Jaison Patterson 2-yard run (Mason Lawler kick) (Drive: 7 plays, 22 yards, 2:46; Bowling Green 38–31)
- (:00) EKU – Jayden Higgins 3-yard pass from Parker McKinney (Patrick Nations kick) (Drive: 14 plays, 75 yards, 3:39; Tied 38–38)

Overtime

- BGSU – Ta'ron Keith 3-yard pass from Matt McDonald (Mason Lawler kick) (Drive: 10 plays, 25 yards, :00; Bowling Green 45–38)
- EKU – Kyeandre Magloire 3-yard run (Patrick Nations kick) (Drive: 3 plays, 25 yards, :00; Tied 45–45)

Overtime (2)

- EKU – Braedon Sloan 4-yard run (Two-point pass failed) (Drive: 3 plays, 25 yards, :00; Eastern Kentucky 51–45)
- BGSU – Odieu Hiliare 7-yard pass from Matt McDonald (Two-point pass failed) (Drive: 5 plays, 25 yards, :00; Tied 51–51)

Overtime (3)

- BGSU – Christian Sims pass from Matt McDonald (Bowling Green 53–51)
- EKU – Jayden Higgins pass from Parker McKinney (Tied 53–53)

Overtime (4)

- EKU – Jayden Higgins pass from Parker McKinney (Eastern Kentucky 55–53)
- BGSU – Odieu Hiliare pass from Matt McDonald (Tied 55–55)

Overtime (5)

- BGSU – Matt McDonald pass failed (Tied 55–55)
- EKU – Parker McKinney pass failed (Tied 55–55)

Overtime (6)

- EKU – Braedon Sloan rush attempt successful (Eastern Kentucky 57–55)
- BGSU – Odieu Hiliare pass from Matt McDonald (Tied 57–57)

Overtime (7)

- BGSU – Matt McDonald pass failed (Tied 57–57)
- EKU – Braedon Sloan pass from Parker McKinney (Eastern Kentucky 59–57)

Statistics	EKU	BGSU
First downs	28	27
Plays–yards	84–442	85–431
Rushes–yards	37–118	45–148
Passing yards	324	283
Passing: comp–att–int	33–47–1	23–40–0
Turnovers		
Time of possession	33:31	26:29

Team	Category	Player	Statistics
EKU	Passing	Parker McKinney	33/47, 324 yards, 3 TDS, 1 INT
EKU	Rushing	Braedon Sloan	9 carries, 56 yards, 2 TDS
EKU	Receiving	Jaden Smith	7 receptions, 102 yards
Bowling Green	Passing	Matt McDonald	23/40, 283 yards, 5 TDS
Bowling Green	Rushing	Jaison Patterson	18 carries, 48 yards, TD
Bowling Green	Receiving	Odieu Hilliare	7 receptions, 60 yards, TD

=== Marshall ===
Marshall Thundering Herd (2–0) at Bowling Green Falcons (0–2) – Game summary

Quarter	1	2	3	4	OT	Total
Thundering Herd	14	7	0	7	3	31
Falcons	0	21	0	7	6	34

at Doyt Perry Stadium • Bowling Green, OH

- Date: Saturday, September 17, 2022
- Game time: 5:00 p.m. EDT
- Game weather: Sunny • Temperature: 82 °F (28 °C) • Wind: SW 9 mph
- Game attendance: 21,158
- Referee: Ted Pitts
- TV announcers (NFLN): Jason Ross Jr. (play-by-play), Tyoka Jackson (analyst)

Game information

First quarter

- (13:59) MRSH – Corey Gammage 51 yard pass from Henry Colombi, Rece Verhoff kick (Drive: 4 plays, 75 yards, 1:01; Marshall 7–0)
- (12:28) MRSH – Caleb McMillan 78 yard pass from Henry Colombi, Rece Verhoff kick (Drive: 2 plays, 79 yards, 0:41; Marshall 14–0)

Second quarter

- (12:30) BGSU – Odieu Hilliare 25 yard pass from Matt McDonald, Mason Lawler kick (Drive: 11 plays, 81 yards, 3:41; Marshall 14–7)
- (9:25) MRSH – Khalan Laborn 5 yard run, Rece Verhoff kick (Drive: 9 plays, 69 yards, 2:59; Marshall 21–7)
- (6:10) BGSU – Odieu Hilliare 27 yard pass from Matt McDonald, Mason Lawler kick (Drive: 6 plays, 75 yards, 3:15; Marshall 21–14)
- (1:44) BGSU – Cavon Croom 30 yard pass from Matt McDonald, Mason Lawler kick (Drive: 7 plays, 59 yards, 2:40; Tied 21–21)

Fourth quarter

- (13:08) BGSU – Harold Fannin Jr. 1 yard run, Mason Lawler kick (Drive: 14 plays, 80 yards, 5:54; Bowling Green 28–21)
- (5:43) MRSH – Khalan Laborn 8 yard run, Rece Verhoff kick (Drive: 6 plays, 53 yards, 2:17; Tied 28–28)

Overtime

- MRSH – Rece Verhoff 38 yard field goal (Drive: 4 plays, 4 yards; Marshall 31–28)
- BGSU – Ta'ron Keith 2 yard pass from Matt McDonald (Drive: 2 plays, 25 yards; Bowling Green 34–31)

Statistics	MRSH	BGSU
First downs	23	19
Plays–yards	75–547	74–377
Rushes–yards	37–191	27–77
Passing yards	356	300
Passing: comp–att–int	26–38–1	29–47–0
Turnovers		
Time of possession	28:12	31:48

Team	Category	Player	Statistics
Marshall	Passing	Henry Colombi	23/34, 338 yards, 2 TD, 1 INT
Marshall	Rushing	Khalan Laborn	24 carries, 157 yards, 2 TD
Marshall	Receiving	Corey Gammage	7 receptions, 100 yards, 1 TD
Bowling Green	Passing	Matt McDonald	27/45, 282 yards, 4 TD
Bowling Green	Rushing	PaSean Wimberly	5 carries, 35 yards
Bowling Green	Receiving	Odieu Hilliare	4 receptions, 79 yards, 2 TD

=== At Mississippi State ===
	1	2	3	4	Total
Falcons	0	7	0	7	14
Bulldogs	17	14	7	7	45

=== At Akron ===
	1	2	3	4	Total
Falcons	10	14	0	7	31
Zips	7	7	7	7	28

=== Buffalo ===
	1	2	3	4	Total
Bulls	17	14	7	0	38
Falcons	0	0	7	0	7

=== Miami (OH) ===
	1	2	3	4	Total
RedHawks	3	7	3	0	13
Falcons	0	7	3	7	17

=== At Central Michigan ===
	1	2	3	4	Total
Falcons	7	10	0	17	34
Chippewas	3	0	7	8	18

=== Western Michigan ===
	1	2	3	4	Total
Broncos	0	0	6	3	9
Falcons	0	6	7	0	13

=== Kent State ===
	1	2	3	4	Total
Golden Flashes	0	20	3	17	40
Falcons	0	0	6	0	6

=== At Toledo ===
	1	2	3	4	Total
Falcons	14	7	6	15	42
Rockets	0	14	0	21	35

=== At Ohio ===
Bowling Green Falcons (6–5, 5–2) vs. Ohio Bobcats (8–3, 6–1)

Quarter	1	2	3	4	Total
Falcons	7	0	0	7	14
Bobcats	0	28	3	7	38

at Peden Stadium • Athens, OH

- Date: Tuesday, November 22, 2022
- Game time: 7:00 p.m. EST
- Game weather: clear, Temperature:50 °F (10 °C)
- Game attendance: 11,693
- Referee: David Siegle
- TV announcers (ESPNU): Connor Onion, Craig Haubert

Game information

First Quarter

- (02:21) BGSU – Broden, Tyrone 44 yd pass from McDonald, Matt (Lawler, Mason kick) 9 plays, 89 yards, TOP 04:13 (BGSU 7–0)

Second Quarter

- (11:44) OHIO – Harris, CJ 5 yd run (Vakos, Nathanial kick) 12 plays, 77 yards, TOP 05:35 (Tied 7–7)
- (08:25) OHIO – Wiglusz, Sam 20 yd pass from Harris, CJ (Vakos, Nathanial kick) 5 plays, 79 yards, TOP 01:34 (OHIO 14–7)
- (03:42) OHIO – Bangura, Sieh 3 yd run (Vakos, Nathanial kick) 8 plays, 51 yards, TOP 03:07 (OHIO 21–7)
- (00:24) OHIO – Harris, CJ 8 yd run (Vakos, Nathanial kick) 3 plays, 14 yards, TOP 00:15 (OHIO 28–7)

Third Quarter

- (02:27) OHIO – Vakos, Nathanial 32 yd field goal 15 plays, 71 yards, TOP 07:39 (OHIO 31–7)

Fourth Quarter

- (11:43) OHIO – Harris, CJ 12 yd run (Vakos, Nathanial kick) 7 plays, 33 yards, TOP 03:24 (OHIO 38–7)
- (02:24) BGSU – Orth, Camden 10 yd run (Lawler, Mason kick) 7 plays, 65 yards, TOP 04:05 (OHIO 38–14)

Statistics	BGSU	OHIO
First downs	14	21
Total yards	279	384
Rushes/yards	21/50	54/188
Passing yards	229	196
Passing: Comp–Att–Int	18–32–3	10–21–0
Time of possession	23:41	36:19

Team	Category	Player	Statistics
Bowling Green	Passing	Matt McDonald	16/29, 217 yards, 1 TD, 3 INT
Bowling Green	Rushing	Nick Mosley	4 rushes, 29 yards
Bowling Green	Receiving	Tyrone Broden	2 receptions, 81 yards, 1 TD
Ohio	Passing	CJ Harris	10/21, 196 yards, 1 TD
Ohio	Rushing	Sieh Bangura	27 rushes, 99 yards, 1 TD
Ohio	Receiving	Jacoby Jones	4 receptions, 96 yards

=== Vs. New Mexico State (Quick Lane Bowl) ===
New Mexico State Aggies (6–6) vs. Bowling Green Falcons (6–6) – 2022 Quick Lane Bowl Game summary

Quarter	1	2	3	4	Total
Aggies	7	7	10	0	24
Falcons	0	0	7	12	19

at Ford Field, Detroit, Michigan

- Date: December 26
- Game time: 12:30 p.m. MST/2:30 p.m. EST
- Game weather: None (played indoors)
- Game attendance: 22,987
- Referee: Jeff Servinski
- TV announcers (ESPN): John Schriffen, Rene Ingoglia, and Tera Talmadge

Game information
First quarter
- NMSU – Star Thomas 15-yard pass from Diego Pavia (Ethan Albertson kick), 9:39. Aggies 7–0. Drive: 8 plays, 70 yards, 4:05.

Second quarter

- NMSU – Eric Marsh 2-yard pass from Diego Pavia (Ethan Albertson kick), 7:36. Aggies 14–0. Drive: 10 plays, 80 yards, 4:11.

Third quarter

- NMSU – Ethan Albertson 35-yard field goal, 11:15. Aggies 17–0. Drive: 7 plays, 57 yards, 3:45.
- BGSU – Ta'Ron Keith 75-yard kickoff return (Mason Lawler kick), 11:02. Aggies 17–7.
- NMSU – Ahmonte Watkins 45-yard run (Ethan Albertson kick), 3:26. Aggies 24–7. Drive: 2 plays, 53 yards, 0:45.

Fourth quarter

- BGSU – Mason Lawler 49-yard field goal, 14:55. Aggies 24–10. Drive: 9 plays, 34 yards, 3:31.
- BGSU – Davion Daniels blocked punt out of the end zone, 7:10. Aggies 24–12.
- BGSU – Tyrone Broden 19-yard pass from Camden Orth (Mason Lawler kick), 6:27. Aggies 24–19. Drive: 2 plays, 48 yards, 0:43.

Statistics

Statistics	NMSU	BGSU
First downs	21	16
Total yards	407	294
Rushing yards	240	84
Passing yards	167	221
Turnovers	1	2
Time of possession	38:10	21:50

Team	Category	Player	Statistics
New Mexico State	Passing	Diego Pavia	17/29, 167 yards, 2 TD, INT
New Mexico State	Rushing	Ahmonte Watkins	9 rushes, 76 yards, TD
New Mexico State	Receiving	Kordell David	5 receptions, 54 yards
Bowling Green	Passing	Camden Orth	14/22, 191 yards, TD
Bowling Green	Rushing	Jaison Patterson	6 rushes, 23 yards
Bowling Green	Receiving	Ta'ron Keith	3 receptions, 69 yards

== Coaching staff ==
Coach	Title
Scot Loeffler	Head coach
Kevin Tolbert	Strength and conditioning Coach
Steve Morrison	Associate head coach / Inside Linebackers coach
Brian White	Assistant head coach / Runningbacks coach
Sammy Lawanson	Assistant head coach / outside linebackers coach
Greg Nosal	Co-offensive coordinator / tight ends coach
Max Warner	Co-offensive coordinator / quarterbacks coach
Eric Lewis	Defensive coordinator / defensive backs coach
Alex Bayer	Special teams coordinator
Erik Campbell	Passing game coordinator / wide receivers coach
Chris Hedden	Run game coordinator / offensive line coach
Julian Campenni	Defensive run game coordinator / defensive line coach
Mitch Fair	Defensive graduate assistant
Brady Thomas	Defensive graduate assistant
Grant Strock	Offensive graduate assistant
Pat Forgarty	Offensive graduate assistant

== Players drafted into the NFL ==
Round	Pick	Player	Position	NFL Club
6	178	Karl Brooks	DT	Green Bay Packers
