= 2022 Toledo Rockets football team =

American college football season

2022 Toledo Rockets football

MAC champion MAC West Division co-champion Boca Raton Bowl champion

MAC Championship, W 17–7 vs. Ohio

Boca Raton Bowl, W 21–19 vs. Liberty
- Conference: Mid-American Conference
- West Division
- Record: 9–5 (5–3 MAC)
- Head coach: Jason Candle (7th season)
- Co-offensive coordinators: Mike Hallett (3rd season); Robert Weiner (3rd season)
- Offensive scheme: Spread
- Defensive coordinator: Vince Kehres (3rd season)
- Co-defensive coordinators: Ross Watson (3rd season); Craig Kuligowski (3rd season)
- Base defense: 4–2–5
- Home stadium: Glass Bowl

2022 Mid-American Conference football standings
| | Conf. | | | Overall |
| Team | W | | L | W | | L |
|---|---|---|---|---|---|---|
East Division
| Ohio xy | 7 | – | 1 | 10 | – | 4 |
| Buffalo | 5 | – | 3 | 7 | – | 6 |
| Bowling Green | 5 | – | 3 | 6 | – | 7 |
| Miami (OH) | 4 | – | 4 | 6 | – | 7 |
| Kent State | 4 | – | 4 | 5 | – | 7 |
| Akron | 1 | – | 7 | 2 | – | 10 |
West Division
| Toledo xy$ | 5 | – | 3 | 9 | – | 5 |
| Eastern Michigan x | 5 | – | 3 | 9 | – | 4 |
| Western Michigan | 4 | – | 4 | 5 | – | 7 |
| Ball State | 3 | – | 5 | 5 | – | 7 |
| Central Michigan | 3 | – | 5 | 4 | – | 8 |
| Northern Illinois | 2 | – | 6 | 3 | – | 9 |
Championship: Toledo 17, Ohio 7
$ – Conference champion; x – Division champion/co-champions; y – Championship game participant; Rankings from AP Poll

The 2022 Toledo Rockets football team represented the University of Toledo during the 2022 NCAA Division I FBS football season. The Rockets were led by seventh-year head coach Jason Candle and played their home games at the Glass Bowl in Toledo, Ohio. They competed as members of the West Division of the Mid-American Conference (MAC).

== Offseason ==
=== Recruiting class ===
College recruiting information (2022)
| Name | Hometown | School | Height | Weight | Commit date |
|---|---|---|---|---|---|
| Nasir Bowers; CB | Lakeland, FL | Lakeland High School | 5 ft 9 in (1.75 m) | 168 lb (76 kg) | Mar 22, 2021 |
| Nasir Bowers; CB | Recruit ratings: Rivals: 247Sports: ESPN: (75) | | | | |
| Emmanuel McNeil-Warren; S | Saint Petersburg, Florida | Lakeland High School | 6 ft 2 in (1.88 m) | 182 lb (83 kg) | Dec 12, 2021 |
| Emmanuel McNeil-Warren; S | Recruit ratings: Rivals: 247Sports: ESPN: (75) | | | | |
| Malachi Davis; DL | Holt, Michigan | Holt High School | 6 ft 5 in (1.96 m) | 245 lb (111 kg) | Oct 1, 2021 |
| Malachi Davis; DL | Recruit ratings: Rivals: 247Sports: ESPN: (73) | | | | |
| Junior Vandeross; ATH | Tampa, Florida | Jesuit High School | 5 ft 8.5 in (1.74 m) | 195 lb (88 kg) | Jun 14, 2021 |
| Junior Vandeross; ATH | Recruit ratings: Rivals: 247Sports: ESPN: (74) | | | | |
| Kiel Eldridge; Edge | Monroeville, Indiana | Heritage High School | 6 ft 5 in (1.96 m) | 230 lb (100 kg) | Jun 29, 2021 |
| Kiel Eldridge; Edge | Recruit ratings: Rivals: 247Sports: ESPN: (73) | | | | |
| Derell Bedingfield Jr. Linebacker | Cleveland, Ohio | Benedictine High School | N/A | N/A | |
| Derell Bedingfield Jr. Linebacker | Recruit ratings: ESPN: (74) | | | | |
Overall recruit ranking: Rivals: Unranked 247Sports: #100
Note: In many cases, Scout, Rivals, 247Sports, On3, and ESPN may conflict in their listings of height and weight.; In these cases, the average was taken. ESPN grades are on a 100-point scale.; Sources: "Rivals commits". Rivals.; "2022 Team Ranking". Rivals.com.; "247Sports commits". 247Sports.

=== Transfer portal ===
==== Outgoing transfers ====
| Name | Pos. | New school |
|---|---|---|
| Matt Landers | WR | Arkansas Razorbacks |
| Andrew Vaught | IOL | Wofford Terriers |
| Jalin Cooper | WR | Duquesne Dukes |
| Jalynn Williams | WR | Western Carolina Catamounts |
| Isaiah Winstead | WR | East Carolina |
| Evan Davis | K | None |
| Gavin Hall | QB | None |
| Anthony Crider | LB | Ohio Dominican Panthers |
| Jaelen Crider | DL | Youngstown State Penguins |
| Justin Clark | CB | Wisconsin Badgers |
| DeAmonte King | ATH | Tiffin Dragons |
| Cauren Lynch | RB | Wayne State Wildcats |
| Carter Bradley | QB | South Alabama Jaguars |
| Geri Theodore | EDGE | Portland State Vikings |
| Dorian Wesley | DL | Alabama A&M Bulldogs |
| Noah Hamlin | S | California Vulcans |
| Saeed Holt | S | Alabama A&M Bulldogs |

==== Incoming transfers ====
Toledo has collected ten players from the transfer portal.

| Name | Pos. | Previous school |
|---|---|---|
| Nick Turner | CB | Arkansas |
| Deshawn Holt | EDGE | Maryland |
| Anthony Torres | TE | Western Michigan |
| Rourke Freeburg | LB | Arizona |
| Peny Boone | RB | Maryland |
| Dallas Gant | LB | Ohio State |
| Chris Ocasio | OL | Edinboro |
| Jaret Frantz | WR | Ball State |
| Jalen Vanderbosch | WR | Siena Heights |
| Andre Fuller | S | Arkansas-Pine |

== Schedule ==
| Date | Time | Opponent | Site | TV | Result | Attendance |
|---|---|---|---|---|---|---|
| September 1 | 7:00 p.m. | LIU* | Glass Bowl; Toledo, OH | ESPN3 | W 37–0 | 21,291 |
| September 10 | 7:00 p.m. | UMass* | Glass Bowl; Toledo, OH | ESPN+ | W 55–10 | 20,147 |
| September 17 | 7:00 p.m. | at No. 3 Ohio State* | Ohio Stadium; Columbus, OH | FOX | L 21–77 | 105,398 |
| September 24 | 3:30 p.m. | at San Diego State* | Snapdragon Stadium; San Diego, CA | FS1 | L 14–17 | 27,108 |
| October 1 | 3:30 p.m. | Central Michigan^{†} | Glass Bowl; Toledo, OH | NFLN | W 38–17 | 22,273 |
| October 8 | 3:30 p.m. | at Northern Illinois | Huskie Stadium; DeKalb, IL | ESPN+ | W 52–32 | 12,682 |
| October 15 | 3:30 p.m. | Kent State | Glass Bowl; Toledo, OH | ESPN+ | W 52–31 | 19,139 |
| October 22 | 1:00 p.m. | at Buffalo | University at Buffalo Stadium; Amherst, NY | ESPN+ | L 27–34 | 14,190 |
| October 29 | 12:00 p.m. | at Eastern Michigan | Rynearson Stadium; Ypsilanti, MI | ESPNU | W 27–24 | 14,270 |
| November 8 | 8:00 p.m. | Ball State | Glass Bowl; Toledo, OH | ESPN | W 28–21 | 14,462 |
| November 15 | 7:00 p.m. | Bowling Green | Glass Bowl; Toledo, OH (rivalry) | ESPNU | L 35–42 | 20,027 |
| November 25 | 12:00 p.m. | at Western Michigan | Waldo Stadium; Kalamazoo, MI | ESPNU | L 14–20 | 8,645 |
| December 3 | 12:00 p.m. | vs. Ohio | Ford Field; Detroit, MI (MAC Championship Game) | ESPN | W 17–7 | 15,550 |
| December 20 | 7:30 p.m. | vs. Liberty | FAU Stadium; Boca Raton, Florida (Boca Raton Bowl) | ESPN | W 21–19 | 20,622 |
*Non-conference game; ^{†}Homecoming; Rankings from AP Poll released prior to the game; All times are in Eastern time

== Game summaries ==
=== LIU ===
| | 1 | 2 | 3 | 4 | Total |
|---|---|---|---|---|---|
| Sharks | 0 | 0 | 0 | 0 | 0 |
| Rockets | 3 | 17 | 0 | 17 | 37 |

=== UMass ===
| | 1 | 2 | 3 | 4 | Total |
|---|---|---|---|---|---|
| Minutemen | 0 | 7 | 0 | 3 | 10 |
| Rockets | 14 | 14 | 17 | 10 | 55 |

=== At #3 Ohio State ===
| | 1 | 2 | 3 | 4 | Total |
|---|---|---|---|---|---|
| Rockets | 7 | 7 | 7 | 0 | 21 |
| #3 Buckeyes | 28 | 14 | 14 | 21 | 77 |

=== At San Diego State ===
| | 1 | 2 | 3 | 4 | Total |
|---|---|---|---|---|---|
| Rockets | 0 | 0 | 0 | 14 | 14 |
| Aztecs | 0 | 7 | 3 | 7 | 17 |

=== Central Michigan ===
| | 1 | 2 | 3 | 4 | Total |
|---|---|---|---|---|---|
| Chippewas | 3 | 0 | 8 | 6 | 17 |
| Rockets | 3 | 28 | 0 | 7 | 38 |

=== At Northern Illinois ===
| | 1 | 2 | 3 | 4 | Total |
|---|---|---|---|---|---|
| Rockets | 21 | 14 | 10 | 7 | 52 |
| Huskies | 7 | 0 | 0 | 25 | 32 |

=== Kent State ===
| | 1 | 2 | 3 | 4 | Total |
|---|---|---|---|---|---|
| Golden Flashes | 21 | 10 | 0 | 0 | 31 |
| Rockets | 7 | 21 | 10 | 14 | 52 |

=== At Buffalo ===
| | 1 | 2 | 3 | 4 | Total |
|---|---|---|---|---|---|
| Rockets | 7 | 13 | 7 | 0 | 27 |
| Bulls | 0 | 7 | 3 | 24 | 34 |

=== At Eastern Michigan ===
| | 1 | 2 | 3 | 4 | Total |
|---|---|---|---|---|---|
| Rockets | 0 | 10 | 7 | 10 | 27 |
| Eagles | 7 | 10 | 7 | 0 | 24 |

=== Ball State ===
| | 1 | 2 | 3 | 4 | Total |
|---|---|---|---|---|---|
| Cardinals | 7 | 7 | 7 | 0 | 21 |
| Rockets | 7 | 7 | 7 | 7 | 28 |

=== Bowling Green ===
| | 1 | 2 | 3 | 4 | Total |
|---|---|---|---|---|---|
| Falcons | 14 | 7 | 6 | 15 | 42 |
| Rockets | 0 | 14 | 0 | 21 | 35 |

=== At Western Michigan ===
| | 1 | 2 | 3 | 4 | Total |
|---|---|---|---|---|---|
| Rockets | 0 | 7 | 0 | 7 | 14 |
| Broncos | 0 | 10 | 10 | 0 | 20 |

=== Ohio–MAC Championship Game ===
| | 1 | 2 | 3 | 4 | Total |
|---|---|---|---|---|---|
| Rockets | 7 | 3 | 0 | 7 | 17 |
| Bobcats | 0 | 7 | 0 | 0 | 7 |

=== Liberty–Boca Raton Bowl ===
| | 1 | 2 | 3 | 4 | Total |
|---|---|---|---|---|---|
| Flames | 7 | 0 | 0 | 12 | 19 |
| Rockets | 0 | 3 | 10 | 8 | 21 |

== After the season ==
=== NFL draft ===
The following Rocket was selected in the 2023 NFL draft following the season.

| Round | Pick | Player | Position | NFL club |
|---|---|---|---|---|
| 7 | 259 | Desjuan Johnson | Defensive tackle | Los Angeles Rams |
