= 2022 Mid-American Conference football season =

- League: NCAA Division I Football Bowl Subdivision
- Sport: Football
- Duration: September 1 - December 3
- Teams: 12

2023 NFL draft
- Top draft pick: OG Sidy Sow, Eastern Michigan
- Picked by: New England Patriots, 117th overall

Regular season
- Season MVP: Kurtis Rourke
- East Division champions: Ohio
- West Division champions: Toledo

MAC Championship Game
- Champions: Toledo
- Runners-up: Ohio
- Finals MVP: Dequan Finn (offense) and Dyontae Johnson (defense)

Seasons
- 2021 2023

2022 Mid-American Conference football standings
	Conf.			Overall
Team	W		L	W		L
East Division
Ohio xy	7	–	1	10	–	4
Buffalo	5	–	3	7	–	6
Bowling Green	5	–	3	6	–	7
Miami (OH)	4	–	4	6	–	7
Kent State	4	–	4	5	–	7
Akron	1	–	7	2	–	10
West Division
Toledo xy$	5	–	3	9	–	5
Eastern Michigan x	5	–	3	9	–	4
Western Michigan	4	–	4	5	–	7
Ball State	3	–	5	5	–	7
Central Michigan	3	–	5	4	–	8
Northern Illinois	2	–	6	3	–	9
Championship: Toledo 17, Ohio 7
$ – Conference champion; x – Division champion/co-champions; y – Championship game participant; Rankings from AP Poll

The 2022 Mid-American Conference football season was the 77th season for the Mid-American Conference (MAC), as part of the 2022 NCAA Division I FBS football season. The season began on September 1 and concluded with its conference championship game on Saturday, December 3 at Ford Field in Detroit, Michigan. Ohio won the East Division with a conference record of 7–1 and Toledo won the West Division with a 5–3 conference record. Toledo won the championship over Ohio by a final score of 17–7.

== Preseason ==
=== Preseason polls ===
==== Media Poll ====
On July 26 the MAC announced the preseason media poll. Defending MAC champion Northern Illinois was named the preseason favorite.

East
Predicted finish	Team	Votes (1st place)
1	Miami	139 (20)
2	Kent State	116 (3)
3	Buffalo	78
4	Ohio	72
5	Bowling Green	71 (1)
6	Akron	28

West
Predicted finish	Team	Votes (1st place)
1	Northern Illinois	122 (11)
2	Toledo	120 (9)
3	Central Michigan	112 (4)
4	Western Michigan	56
5	Eastern Michigan	52
6	Ball State	42

Media poll (MAC Championship)
Rank	Team	Votes
1	Northern Illinois	9
2	Toledo	6
3	Miami	5
3	Central Michigan	4

==== Coaches Poll ====
On August 29 the MAC released the coaches poll. Defending champion Northern Illinois was favored to win the west while Kent State was selected as a slight favorite to win the East. Northern Illinois received 4 of the 12 MAC championship votes.

East
Predicted finish	Team	Votes (1st place)
1	Kent State	61 (5)
2	Miami	60 (6)
3	Buffalo	43
4	Bowling Green	36 (1)
5	Ohio	35
6	Akron	16

West
Predicted finish	Team	Votes (1st place)
1	Northern Illinois	61 (6)
2	Toledo	51
3	Central Michigan	50 (2)
4	Western Michigan	45 (3)
5	Eastern Michigan	24
6	Ball State	21 (1)

Coaches poll (MAC Championship)
Rank	Team	Votes
1	Northern Illinois	4
2	Kent State	3
3	Miami	2
3	Western Michigan	2
5	Ball State	1

=== Individual Award Preseason Watchlists ===
Award	Head Coach/Player	School	Position	Ref
Lott Trophy	none			
Dodd Trophy	none			
Maxwell Award	Dequan Finn	Toledo	QB	
Maxwell Award	Brett Gabbert	Miami	QB	
Maxwell Award	Hassan Beydoun	Eastern Michigan	WR	
Maxwell Award	Marquez Cooper	Kent State	WR	
Maxwell Award	Lew Nichols III	Central Michigan	RB	
Maxwell Award	Sean Tyler	Western Michigan	RB	
Davey O'Brien Award	Brett Gabbert	Miami	QB	
Doak Walker Award	Lew Nichols III	Central Michigan	RB	
Doak Walker Award	Sean Tyler	Western Michigan	RB	
Doak Walker Award	Samson Evans	Eastern Michigan	RB	
Doak Walker Award	Antario Brown	Northern Illinois	RB	
Doak Walker Award	Harrison Waylee	Northern Illinois	RB	
Biletnikoff Award	Hassan Beydoun	Eastern Michigan	WR	
Biletnikoff Award	Dante Cephas	Kent State	WR	
Biletnikoff Award	Jayshon Jackson	Ball State	WR	
Biletnikoff Award	Quain Williams	Buffalo	WR	
Biletnikoff Award	Trayvon Rudolph	Northern Illinois	WR	
John Mackey Award	Kris Leach	Kent State	TE	
John Mackey Award	Christian Sims	Bowling Green	TE	
Rimington Trophy	Jacob Gideon	Western Michigan	C	
Butkus Award	Darren Anders	Bowling Green	LB	
Butkus Award	James Patterson	Buffalo	LB	
Jim Thorpe Award	CJ Brown	Northern Illinois	S	
Jim Thorpe Award	Jordan Anderson	Bowling Green	S	
Jim Thorpe Award	Dorian Jackson	Western Michigan	CB	

Award	Head Coach/Player	School	Position	Ref
Bronko Nagurski Trophy	CJ Brown	Northern Illinois	S	
Bronko Nagurski Trophy	Darren Anders	Bowling Green	LB	
Bronko Nagurski Trophy	James Patterson	Buffalo	LB	
Bronko Nagurski Trophy	Jamal Hines	Toledo	LB	
Outland Trophy	Desjuan Johnson	Toledo	DT	
Outland Trophy	Nolan Potte	Northern Illinois	T	
Outland Trophy	Sidy Sow	Eastern Michigan	T	
Outland Trophy	Daymond Williams	Buffalo	DT	
Lou Groza Award	John Richardson	Northern Illinois	K	
Ray Guy Award	Dom Dzioban	Miami	P	
Ray Guy Award	Luke Elzinga	Central Michigan	P	
Ray Guy Award	Nick Mihalic	Western Michigan	P	
Paul Hornung Award	Hassan Beydoun	Eastern Michigan	WR	
Paul Hornung Award	Ron Cook Jr.	Buffalo	RB	
Paul Hornung Award	Devin Maddox	Toledo	WR	
Paul Hornung Award	Trayvon Rudolph	Northern Illinois	WR	
Paul Hornung Award	Sean Tyler	Western Michigan	RB	
Paul Hornung Award	Jalen Walker	Miami	WR	
Wuerffel Trophy	Brandon Martin	Ball State	LB	
Wuerffel Trophy	Austin Osborne	Bowling Green	WR	
Wuerffel Trophy	Matt McDonald	Bowling Green	QB	
Wuerffel Trophy	Max Michel	Buffalo	LB	
Wuerffel Trophy	Tariq Speights	Eastern Michigan	LB	
Wuerffel Trophy	Isaac Vance	Kent State	WR	
Wuerffel Trophy	Nick Rattin	Northern Illinois	LB	
Wuerffel Trophy	Mitchell Berg	Toledo	OL	
Wuerffel Trophy	Boone Bonnema	Western Michigan	LB	

Award	Head Coach/Player	School	Position	Ref
Walter Camp Award	Dante Cephas	Kent State	WR	
Walter Camp Award	Brett Gabbert	Miami	QB	
Walter Camp Award	Lew Nichols III	Central Michigan	RB	
Bednarik Award	James Patterson	Buffalo	LB	
Bednarik Award	CJ Brown	Northern Illinois	S	
Bednarik Award	Jose Ramirez	Eastern Michigan	DL	
Bednarik Award	Jamal Hines	Toledo	LB	
Rotary Lombardi Award	Darren Anders	Bowling Green	LB	
Rotary Lombardi Award	Jamal Hines	Toledo	LB	
Patrick Mannelly Award	none			
Earl Campbell Tyler Rose Award	none			
Polynesian College Football Player Of The Year Award	none			
Manning Award	Brett Gabbert	Miami	QB	
Johnny Unitas Golden Arm Award	Dequan Finn	Toledo	QB	
Johnny Unitas Golden Arm Award	Rocky Lombardi	Northern Illinois	QB	
Johnny Unitas Golden Arm Award	Daniel Richardson	Central Michigan	QB	
Johnny Unitas Golden Arm Award	Kurtis Rourke	Ohio	QB	
Ted Hendricks Award				

== Head coaches ==
- On November 4, 2021, Akron fired head coach Tom Arth after posting a 3–24 record during his tenure with the school. The school hired Oregon offensive coordinator Joe Moorhead as the new head coach for the 2022 season.

Team	Head coach	Previous Job	Years at school	Overall record	MAC record	MAC titles
Akron	Joe Moorhead	Oregon (Off. Coordinator)	1	52–25 (.675)	0–0 (–)	0
Ball State	Mike Neu	New Orleans Saints (QB Coach)	7	28–41 (.406)	17–29 (.370)	1
Bowling Green	Scot Loeffler	Boston College (Off. Coordinator/QB Coach)	4	7–22 (.241)	4–17 (.190)	0
Buffalo	Maurice Linguist	Michigan (Co def. coordinator)	2	4–8 (.333)	2–6 (.250)	0
Central Michigan	Jim McElwain	Florida	4	64–40 (.615)	15–7 (.682)	0
Eastern Michigan	Chris Creighton	Drake	9	176–103 (.631)	22–40 (.355)	0
Kent State	Sean Lewis	Syracuse (Co Off. Coordinator)	4	19–24 (.442)	15–13 (.536)	0
Miami	Chuck Martin	Notre Dame (Off. Coordinator/QB Coach)	8	113–59 (.657)	33–26 (.559)	1
Northern Illinois	Thomas Hammock	Baltimore Ravens (running backs coach)	4	14–18 (.438)	10–12 (.455)	1
Ohio	Tim Albin	Ohio (Associate Head Coach)	2	28–17 (.622)	3–5 (.375)	0
Toledo	Jason Candle	Toledo (Off. Coordinator)	7	45–27 (.625)	30–16 (.652)	1
Western Michigan	Tim Lester	Purdue (QB Coach)	6	62–48 (.564)	22–16 (.579)	0

=== Post-season changes ===
- On November 28, Western Michigan announced that they had fired head coach Tim Lester. Lester posted a record of 37–32 over six years at the school. On December 8, Western Michigan announced that they had hired Louisville offensive coordinator Lance Taylor to be the new head coach.
- On December 5, Kent State head coach Sean Lewis was announced as the new offensive coordinator at Colorado in the Pac-12 conference. On December 14, Kent State announced Kenni Burns as the new head coach for the 2023 season.

== Rankings ==
		Pre	Wk 1	Wk 2	Wk 3	Wk 4	Wk 5	Wk 6	Wk 7	Wk 8	Wk 9	Wk 10	Wk 11	Wk 12	Wk 13	Wk 14	Final
Akron	AP																
Akron	C																
Akron	CFP	Not released															
Ball State	AP																
Ball State	C																
Ball State	CFP	Not released															
Bowling Green	AP																
Bowling Green	C																
Bowling Green	CFP	Not released															
Buffalo	AP																
Buffalo	C																
Buffalo	CFP	Not released															
Central Michigan	AP																
Central Michigan	C																
Central Michigan	CFP	Not released															
Eastern Michigan	AP																
Eastern Michigan	C																
Eastern Michigan	CFP	Not released															
Kent State	AP																
Kent State	C																
Kent State	CFP	Not released															
Miami	AP																
Miami	C																
Miami	CFP	Not released															
Northern Illinois	AP																
Northern Illinois	C																
Northern Illinois	CFP	Not released															
Ohio	AP														RV		
Ohio	C																RV
Ohio	CFP	Not released															
Toledo	AP																
Toledo	C												RV				
Toledo	CFP	Not released															
Western Michigan	AP																
Western Michigan	C																
Western Michigan	CFP	Not released															

Legend
	Improvement in ranking
	Drop in ranking
	Not ranked previous week
	No change in ranking from previous week
RV	Received votes but were not ranked in Top 25 of poll
т	Tied with team above or below also with this symbol

== Schedule ==
The schedule for the 2022 MAC football season was released on February 25, 2022.

Index to colors and formatting
MAC member won
MAC member lost
MAC teams in **bold**

All times Eastern time.

=== Week 1 ===
Date	Time	Visiting team	Home team	Site	TV	Result	Attendance	Ref.
September 1	6:00 p.m.	Saint Francis (PA)	**Akron**	InfoCision Stadium • Akron, OH	ESPN3	**W** 30–23 ^{OT}	8,752	
September 1	7:00 p.m.	**Central Michigan**	No. 12 Oklahoma State	Boone Pickens Stadium • Stillwater, OK	FS1	**L** 44–58	53,808	
September 1	7:00 p.m.	**Ball State**	Tennessee	Neyland Stadium • Knoxville, TN	SECN	**L** 10–59	92,236	
September 1	7:00 p.m.	LIU	**Toledo**	Glass Bowl • Toledo, OH	ESPN3	**W** 37–0	21,291	
September 1	8:00 p.m.	Eastern Illinois	**Northern Illinois**	Huskie Stadium • DeKalb, IL	ESPN+	**W** 34–27	10,864	
September 2	7:00 p.m.	Eastern Kentucky	**Eastern Michigan**	Rynearson Stadium • Ypsilanti, MI	ESPN3	**W** 42–34	16,531	
September 2	7:00 p.m.	**Western Michigan**	No. 15 Michigan State	Spartan Stadium • East Lansing, MI	ESPN	**L** 13–35	73,928	
September 3	12:00 p.m.	**Buffalo**	Maryland	Maryland Stadium • College Park, MD	BTN	**L** 10–31	30,223	
September 3	2:30 p.m.	**Bowling Green**	UCLA	Rose Bowl • Pasadena, CA	P12N	**L** 17–45	27,143	
September 3	6:00 p.m.	Florida Atlantic	**Ohio**	Peden Stadium • Athens, OH	ESPN+	**W** 41–38	20,003	
September 3	7:00 p.m.	**Miami (OH)**	No. 20 Kentucky	Kroger Field • Lexington, KY	ESPN+/SEC+	**L** 13–37	61,139	
September 3	10:30 p.m.	**Kent State**	Washington	Husky Stadium • Seattle, WA	FS1	**L** 20–45	56,112	
^{#}Rankings from AP Poll released prior to game. All times are in Eastern Time.

=== Week 2 ===
Date	Time	Visiting team	Home team	Site	TV	Result	Attendance	Ref.
September 10	12:00 p.m.	**Ohio**	Penn State	Beaver Stadium • University Park, PA	ABC	**L** 10–46	107,306	
September 10	1:00 p.m.	South Alabama	**Central Michigan**	Kelly/Shorts Stadium • Mount Pleasant, MI	ESPN+	**L** 24–38	17,205	
September 10	2:00 p.m.	**Western Michigan**	**Ball State**	Scheumann Stadium • Muncie, IN	ESPN+	**WMU** 37–30	12,972	
September 10	4:00 p.m.	**Akron**	No. 14 Michigan State	Spartan Stadium • East Lansing, MI	BTN	**L** 0–52	70,079	
September 10	4:00 p.m.	Eastern Kentucky	**Bowling Green**	Doyt Perry Stadium • Bowling Green, OH	ESPN3	**L** 57–59 ^{7OT}	17,376	
September 10	6:00 p.m.	No. 15 (FCS) Holy Cross	**Buffalo**	UB Stadium • Buffalo, NY	ESPN+	**L** 31–37	16,933	
September 10	6:00 p.m.	Robert Morris	**Miami (OH)**	Yager Stadium • Oxford, OH	ESPN3	**W** 31–14	9,828	
September 10	7:00 p.m.	**Kent State**	No. 7 Oklahoma	Gaylord Family Oklahoma Memorial Stadium • Norman, OK	ESPN+	**L** 3–33	83,911	
September 10	7:00 p.m.	UMass	**Toledo**	Glass Bowl • Toledo, OH	ESPN+	**W** 55–10	20,147	
September 10	7:00 p.m.	**Northern Illinois**	Tulsa	H. A. Chapman Stadium • Tulsa, OK	ESPN+	**L** 35–38	22,113	
September 10	7:00 p.m.	**Eastern Michigan**	Louisiana	Cajun Field • Lafayette, LA	NFLN	**L** 21–49	15,352	
^{#}Rankings from AP Poll released prior to game. All times are in Eastern Time.

=== Week 3 ===
Date	Time	Visiting team	Home team	Site	TV	Result	Attendance	Ref.
September 17	12:00 p.m.	Cincinnati	**Miami (OH)**	Paycor Stadium • Cincinnati, OH (Victory Bell)	ESPNU	**L** 17–38	30,109	
September 17	12:00 p.m.	LIU	**Kent State**	Dix Stadium • Kent, OH	ESPN3	**W** 63–10	15,452	
September 17	1:00 p.m.	**Buffalo**	Coastal Carolina	Brooks Stadium • Conway, SC	ESPN+	**L** 26–38	13,372	
September 17	1:00 p.m.	Bucknell	**Central Michigan**	Kelly/Shorts Stadium • Mount Pleasant, MI	ESPN3	**W** 41–0	21,554	
September 17	2:00 p.m.	**Ohio**	Iowa State	Jack Trice Stadium • Ames, IA	ESPN+/B12N	**L** 10–43	58,138	
September 17	2:00 p.m.	Murray State	**Ball State**	Scheumann Stadium • Muncie, IN	ESPN+	**W** 31–0	14,413	
September 17	3:30 p.m.	Vanderbilt	**Northern Illinois**	Huskie Stadium • DeKalb, IL	CBSSN	**L** 28–38	14,110	
September 17	5:00 p.m.	Marshall	**Bowling Green**	Doyt Perry Stadium • Bowling Green, OH	NFLN	**W** 34–31 ^{OT}	21,158	
September 17	7:00 p.m.	**Toledo**	No. 3 Ohio State	Ohio Stadium • Columbus, OH	FOX	**L** 21–77	105,398	
September 17	7:00 p.m.	**Akron**	No. 15 Tennessee	Neyland Stadium • Knoxville, TN	ESPN+/SECN	**L** 6–63	101,915	
September 17	7:30 p.m.	No. 23 Pittsburgh	**Western Michigan**	Waldo Stadium • Kalamazoo, MI	ESPNU	**L** 13–34	22,875	
September 17	11:00 p.m.	**Eastern Michigan**	Arizona State	Sun Devil Stadium • Tempe, AZ	P12N	**W** 30–21	43,788	
^{#}Rankings from AP Poll released prior to game. All times are in Eastern Time.

=== Week 4 ===
Date	Time	Visiting team	Home team	Site	TV	Result	Attendance	Ref.
September 24	12:00 p.m.	**Kent State**	No. 1 Georgia	Sanford Stadium • Athens, GA	ESPN+/SECN	**L** 22–39	92,746	
September 24	12:00 p.m.	**Central Michigan**	No. 14 Penn State	Beaver Stadium • University Park, PA	BTN	**L** 14–33	106,624	
September 24	12:00 p.m.	**Bowling Green**	Mississippi State	Davis Wade Stadium • Starkville, MS	SECN	**L** 14–45	48,376	
September 24	12:00 p.m.	**Buffalo**	**Eastern Michigan**	Rynearson Stadium • Ypsilanti, MI	CBSSN	**UB** 50–31	14,524	
September 24	2:00 p.m.	Fordham	**Ohio**	Peden Stadium • Athens, OH	ESPN+	**W** 59–52	19.024	
September 24	3:30 p.m.	**Toledo**	San Diego State	Snapdragon Stadium • San Diego, CA	FS1	**L** 14–17	27,108	
September 24	6:00 p.m.	**Akron**	Liberty	Williams Stadium • Lynchburg, VA	ESPN+	**L** 12–21	20,004	
September 24	6:00 p.m.	**Ball State**	Georgia Southern	Paulson Stadium • Statesboro, GA	ESPN+	**L** 23–34	18,434	
September 24	7:00 p.m.	**Northern Illinois**	No. 8 Kentucky	Kroger Field • Lexington, KY	ESPN2	**L** 23–31	61,579	
September 24	7:30 p.m.	**Miami (OH)**	Northwestern	Ryan Field • Evanston, IL	BTN	**W** 17–14	23,773	
September 24	10:30 p.m.	**Western Michigan**	San Jose State	CEFCU Stadium • San Jose, CA	CBSSN	**L** 6–34	17,058	
^{#}Rankings from AP Poll released prior to game. All times are in Eastern Time.

=== Week 5 ===
Date	Time	Visiting team	Home team	Site	TV	Result	Attendance	Ref.
October 1	2:00 p.m.	**Northern Illinois**	Ball State	Scheumann Stadium • Muncie, IN (Bronze Stalk Trophy)	ESPN+	**BSU** 44–38 ^{2OT}	10,012	
October 1	2:00 p.m.	UMass	Eastern Michigan	Rynearson Stadium • Ypsilanti, MI	ESPN+	**W** 20–13	16,478	
October 1	3:30 p.m.	**Central Michigan**	Toledo	Glass Bowl • Toledo, OH	NFLN	**TOL** 38–17	22,273	
October 1	3:30 p.m.	**Bowling Green**	Akron	InfoCision Stadium • Akron, OH	ESPN+	**BGSU** 31–28	8,093	
October 1	3:30 p.m.	**Miami (OH)**	Buffalo	UB Stadium • Buffalo, NY	ESPNU	**UB** 24–20	18,615	
October 1	3:30 p.m.	**Ohio**	Kent State	Dix Stadium • Kent, OH	ESPN+	**KSU** 31–24 ^{OT}	20,392	
October 1	6:00 p.m.	New Hampshire	Western Michigan	Waldo Stadium • Kalamazoo, MI	ESPN3	**W** 44–7	20,119	
^{#}Rankings from AP Poll released prior to game. All times are in Eastern Time.

=== Week 6 ===
Date	Time	Visiting team	Home team	Site	TV	Result	Attendance	Ref.
October 8	12:00 p.m.	Eastern Michigan	Western Michigan	Waldo Stadium • Kalamazoo, MI (Michigan MAC Trophy)	CBSSN	**EMU** 45–23	10,876	
October 8	12:00 p.m.	Buffalo	Bowling Green	Doyt Perry Stadium • Bowling Green, OH	ESPN+	**UB** 38–7	8,724	
October 8	2:00 p.m.	Akron	Ohio	Peden Stadium • Athens, OH	ESPN3	**OHIO** 55–34	23,108	
October 8	3:30 p.m.	Kent State	Miami (OH)	Yager Stadium • Oxford, OH	ESPN+	**M-OH** 27–24	14,366	
October 8	3:30 p.m.	Ball State	Central Michigan	Kelly/Shorts Stadium • Mount Pleasant, MI	ESPN+	**BSU** 17–16	22,305	
October 8	3:30 p.m.	Toledo	Northern Illinois	Huskie Stadium • DeKalb, IL	ESPN+	**TOL** 52–32	12,682	
^{#}Rankings from AP Poll released prior to game. All times are in Eastern Time.

=== Week 7 ===
Date	Time	Visiting team	Home team	Site	TV	Result	Attendance	Ref.
October 15	12:00 p.m.	**Central Michigan**	**Akron**	InfoCision Stadium • Akron, OH	ESPN+	**CMU** 28–21	14,814	
October 15	12:00 p.m.	**Miami (OH)**	**Bowling Green**	Doyt Perry Stadium • Bowling Green, OH	ESPN+	**BGSU** 17–13	7,841	
October 15	1:00 p.m.	**Buffalo**	UMass	Warren McGuirk Alumni Stadium • Amherst, MA	ESPN3	**W** 34–7	13,378	
October 15	2:00 p.m.	UConn	**Ball State**	Scheumann Stadium • Muncie, IN	ESPN3	**W** 25–21	10,006	
October 15	3:30 p.m.	**Northern Illinois**	**Eastern Michigan**	Rynearson Stadium • Ypsilanti, MI	ESPN+	**NIU** 39–10	15,100	
October 15	3:30 p.m.	**Kent State**	**Toledo**	Glass Bowl • Toledo, OH	ESPN+	**TOL** 52–31	19,139	
October 15	3:30 p.m.	**Ohio**	**Western Michigan**	Waldo Stadium • Kalamazoo, MI	CBSSN	**OHIO** 33–14	20,320	
^{#}Rankings from AP Poll released prior to game. All times are in Eastern Time.

=== Week 8 ===
Date	Time	Visiting team	Home team	Site	TV	Result	Attendance	Ref.
October 22	12:00 p.m.	Akron	Kent State	Dix Stadium • Kent, OH (Wagon Wheel)	ESPN+	**KSU** 33–27	20,472	
October 22	1:00 p.m.	Toledo	Buffalo	UB Stadium • Buffalo, NY	ESPN+	**UB** 34–27	14,190	
October 22	1:00 p.m.	Bowling Green	Central Michigan	Kelly/Shorts Stadium • Mount Pleasant, MI	ESPN3	**BGSU** 34–18	14,676	
October 22	2:00 p.m.	Eastern Michigan	Ball State	Scheumann Stadium • Muncie, IN	ESPN+	**EMU** 20–16	15,698	
October 22	2:00 p.m.	Northern Illinois	Ohio	Peden Stadium • Athens, OH	ESPN+	**OHIO** 24–17	15,922	
October 22	3:30 p.m.	Western Michigan	Miami (OH)	Yager Stadium • Oxford, OH	CBSSN	**WMU** 16–10	21,618	
^{#}Rankings from AP Poll released prior to game. All times are in Eastern Time.

=== Week 9 ===
Date	Time	Visiting team	Home team	Site	TV	Result	Attendance	Ref.
October 29	12:00 p.m.	**Toledo**	**Eastern Michigan**	Rynearson Stadium • Ypsilanti, MI	ESPNU	**TOL** 27–24	14,270	
October 29	12:00 p.m.	**Miami (OH)**	**Akron**	InfoCision Stadium • Akron, OH	ESPN+	**M-OH** 27–9	11,749	
^{#}Rankings from AP Poll released prior to game. All times are in Eastern Time.

=== Week 10 ===
Date	Time	Visiting team	Home team	Site	TV	Result	Attendance	Ref.
November 1	7:00 p.m.	**Ball State**	**Kent State**	Dix Stadium • Kent, OH	ESPNU	**BSU** 27–20	6,455	
November 1	7:30 p.m.	**Buffalo**	**Ohio**	Peden Stadium • Athens, OH	ESPN2	**OHIO** 45–24	16,401	
November 2	7:00 p.m.	**Central Michigan**	**Northern Illinois**	Huskie Stadium • DeKalb, IL	ESPNU	**CMU** 35–22	6,055	
November 2	7:00 p.m.	**Western Michigan**	**Bowling Green**	Doyt Perry Stadium • Bowling Green, OH	ESPN2	**BGSU** 13–9	7,589	
^{#}Rankings from AP Poll released prior to game. All times are in Eastern Time.

=== Week 11 ===
Date	Time	Visiting team	Home team	Site	TV	Result	Attendance	Ref.
November 8	7:00 p.m.	Eastern Michigan	Akron	InfoCision Stadium • Akron, OH	CBSSN	**EMU** 37–21	12,589	
November 8	7:30 p.m.	Ohio	Miami (OH)	Yager Stadium • Oxford, OH (Battle of the Bricks)	ESPN2	**OHIO** 37–21	15,490	
November 8	8:00 p.m.	Ball State	Toledo	Glass Bowl • Toledo, OH	ESPN	**TOL** 28–21	14,462	
November 9	7:00 p.m.	Buffalo	Central Michigan	Kelly/Shorts Stadium • Mount Pleasant, MI	ESPN2	**CMU** 31-27	9,103	
November 9	7:00 p.m.	Kent State	Bowling Green	Doyt Perry Stadium • Bowling Green, OH (Anniversary Award)	CBSSN	**KSU** 40–6	7,291	
November 9	7:00 p.m.	Northern Illinois	Western Michigan	Waldo Stadium • Kalamazoo, MI	ESPNU	**NIU** 24-21	8,722	
^{#}Rankings from AP Poll released prior to game. All times are in Eastern Time.

=== Week 12 ===
Date	Time	Visiting team	Home team	Site	TV	Result	Attendance	Ref.
November 15	7:00 p.m.	Bowling Green	Toledo	Glass Bowl • Toledo, OH (Battle of I-75)	ESPNU	**BGSU** 42–35	20,027	
November 15	7:00 p.m.	Ohio	Ball State	Scheumann Stadium • Muncie, IN	ESPN2	**OHIO** 32–18	6,722	
November 16	6:00 p.m.	Eastern Michigan	Kent State	Dix Stadium • Kent, OH	ESPN2	**EMU** 31–24	3,998	
November 16	7:00 p.m.	Miami (OH)	Northern Illinois	Huskie Stadium • DeKalb, IL	CBSSN	**M-OH** 29–23	5,187	
November 16	8:00 p.m.	Western Michigan	Central Michigan	Kelly/Shorts Stadium • Mount Pleasant, MI (rivalry, Michigan MAC Trophy)	ESPNU	**WMU** 12–10	10,097	
December 2	1:00 p.m.	Akron	Buffalo	UB Stadium • Buffalo, NY	ESPN+	**UB** 23–22	12,247	
^{#}Rankings from AP Poll released prior to game. All times are in Eastern Time.

=== Week 13 ===
Date	Time	Visiting team	Home team	Site	TV	Result	Attendance	Ref.
November 22	7:00 p.m.	Ball State	Miami (OH)	Yager Stadium • Oxford, OH (Red Bird Rivalry)	ESPN+	**M-OH** 18-17	14,021	
November 22	7:00 p.m.	Bowling Green	Ohio	Peden Stadium • Athens, OH	ESPNU	**OHIO** 38-14	11,693	
November 25	12:00 p.m.	Central Michigan	Eastern Michigan	Rynearson Stadium • Ypsilanti, MI (rivalry, Michigan MAC Trophy)	CBSSN	**EMU** 38–19	14,213	
November 25	12:00 p.m.	Toledo	Western Michigan	Waldo Stadium • Kalamazoo, MI	ESPNU	**WMU** 20–14	8,645	
November 26	1:00 p.m.	Kent State	Buffalo	UB Stadium • Buffalo, NY	ESPN+	**KSU** 30–27 ^{OT}	12,302	
November 26	1:30 p.m.	Akron	Northern Illinois	Huskie Stadium • DeKalb, IL	ESPN3	**AKR** 44–12	6,288	
^{#}Rankings from AP Poll released prior to game. All times are in Eastern Time.

=== MAC Conference Championship Game ===
Date	Time	Visiting team	Home team	Site	TV	Result	Attendance	Ref.
December 3	12:00 p.m.	**Ohio**	**Toledo**	Ford Field • Detroit, MI	ESPN	**TOL** 17–7	15,550	
^{#}Rankings from AP Poll released prior to game. All times are in Eastern Time.

== Postseason ==
=== Bowl Games ===
The MAC finished with a 4–2 bowl record which was good enough to win the Bowl Challenge Cup

Legend
MAC Win
MAC Loss

Bowl game	Date	Site	Television	Time (EST)	MAC team	Opponent	Score	Attendance
Bahamas Bowl	December 16	Thomas Robinson Stadium • Nassau, Bahamas	ESPN	11:30 a.m.	Miami (OH)	UAB	L 20–24	12,172
Famous Idaho Potato Bowl	December 20	Albertsons Stadium • Boise, ID	ESPN	3:30 p.m.	Eastern Michigan	San Jose State	W 41–27	10,122
Boca Raton Bowl	December 20	FAU Stadium • Boca Raton, FL	ESPN	7:30 p.m.	Toledo	Liberty	W 21–19	20,622
Quick Lane Bowl	December 26	Ford Field • Detroit, MI	ESPN	2:30 p.m.	Bowling Green	New Mexico State	L 19–24	22,987
Camellia Bowl	December 27	Cramton Bowl • Montgomery, AL	ESPN	12:00 p.m.	Buffalo	Georgia Southern	W 23–21	15,322
Arizona Bowl	December 30	Arizona Stadium • Tucson, AZ	Barstool Sports	4:30 p.m.	Ohio	Wyoming	W 30–27 ^{OT}	

=== Selection of teams ===
- Bowl eligible (6): Bowling Green, Buffalo, Eastern Michigan, Miami (OH), Ohio, Toledo
- Bowl ineligible (6): Akron, Ball State, Central Michigan, Kent State, Northern Illinois, Western Michigan

== MAC records vs. other conferences ==
2022–2023 records against non-conference foes:

Regular season

Power Five Conferences	Record
ACC	0–1
Big 12	0–3
Big Ten	1–6
BYU/Notre Dame	0–0
Pac-12	1–2
SEC	0–7
Power 5 Total	2–19
Other FBS Conferences	Record
American	0–2
C–USA	1–0
Independents (Excluding BYU/Notre Dame)	4–1
Mountain West	0–2
Sun Belt	1–4
Other FBS Total	6–9
FCS Opponents	Record
Football Championship Subdivision	10–2
Total Non-Conference Record	18–30

Postseason

Power Five Conferences	Record
ACC	0–0
Big 12	0–0
Big Ten	0–0
BYU/Notre Dame	0–0
Pac-12	0–0
SEC	0–0
Power 5 Total	0–0
Other FBS Conferences	Record
American	0–0
C–USA	0–1
Independents (Excluding BYU/Notre Dame)	1–1
Mountain West	2–0
Sun Belt	1–0
Other FBS Total	4–2
Total Bowl Record	4–2

=== Mid-American vs Power 5 matchups ===
This is a list of games the MAC has scheduled versus power conference teams (ACC, Big Ten, Big 12, Pac-12, BYU, Notre Dame and SEC). All rankings are from the current AP Poll at the time of the game.

Date	Conference	Visitor	Home	Site	Score
September 1	Big 12	Central Michigan	No. 12 Oklahoma State	Boone Pickens Stadium • Stillwater, OK	L 44–58
September 1	SEC	Ball State	Tennessee	Neyland Stadium • Knoxville, TN	L 10–59
September 2	Big Ten	Western Michigan	No. 15 Michigan State	Spartan Stadium • East Lansing, MI	L 13–35
September 3	Pac-12	Bowling Green	UCLA	Rose Bowl • Pasadena, CA	L 17–45
September 3	Big Ten	Buffalo	Maryland	Maryland Stadium • College Park, MD	L 10–31
September 3	Pac-12	Kent State	Washington	Husky Stadium • Seattle, WA	L 20–45
September 3	SEC	Miami (OH)	No. 20 Kentucky	Kroger Field • Lexington, KY	L 13–37
September 10	Big Ten	Akron	No. 14 Michigan State	Spartan Stadium • East Lansing, MI	L 0–52
September 10	Big 12	Kent State	No. 7 Oklahoma	Gaylord Family Oklahoma Memorial Stadium • Norman, OK	L 3–33
September 10	Big Ten	Ohio	Penn State	Beaver Stadium • University Park, PA	L 10–46
September 17	SEC	Akron	No. 15 Tennessee	Neyland Stadium • Knoxville, TN	L 6–63
September 17	Pac-12	Eastern Michigan	Arizona State	Sun Devil Stadium • Tempe, AZ	W 30–21
September 17	SEC	Vanderbilt	Northern Illinois	Huskie Stadium • DeKalb, IL	L 28–38
September 17	Big 12	Ohio	Iowa State	Jack Trice Stadium • Ames, IA	L 10–43
September 17	Big Ten	Toledo	No. 3 Ohio State	Ohio Stadium • Columbus, OH	L 21–77
September 17	ACC	No. 23 Pittsburgh	Western Michigan	Waldo Stadium • Kalamazoo, MI	L 13–34
September 24	SEC	Bowling Green	Mississippi State	Davis Wade Stadium • Starkville, MS	L 14–45
September 24	Big Ten	Central Michigan	No. 14 Penn State	Beaver Stadium • University Park, PA	L 14–33
September 24	SEC	Kent State	No. 1 Georgia	Sanford Stadium • Athens, GA	L 22–39
September 24	Big Ten	Miami (OH)	Northwestern	Ryan Field • Evanston, IL	W 17–14
September 24	SEC	Northern Illinois	No. 8 Kentucky	Kroger Field • Lexington, KY	L 23–31

=== Mid-American vs Group of Five matchups ===
The following games include MAC teams competing against teams from the American, C-USA, Mountain West or Sun Belt.

Date	Conference	Visitor	Home	Site	Score
September 3	C-USA	Florida Atlantic	Ohio	Peden Stadium • Athens, OH	W 41–38
September 10	Sun Belt	South Alabama	Central Michigan	Kelly/Shorts Stadium • Mount Pleasant, MI	L 24–38
September 10	Sun Belt	Eastern Michigan	Louisiana	Cajun Field • Lafayette, LA	L 21–49
September 10	American	Northern Illinois	Tulsa	H. A. Chapman Stadium • Tulsa, OK	L 35–38
September 17	Sun Belt	Marshall	Bowling Green	Doyt Perry Stadium • Bowling Green, OH	W 34–31 ^{OT}
September 17	Sun Belt	Buffalo	Coastal Carolina	Brooks Stadium • Conway, SC	L 26–38
September 17	American	Cincinnati	Miami (OH)	Paul Brown Stadium • Cincinnati, OH (Victory Bell)	L 17–38
September 24	Sun Belt	Ball State	Georgia Southern	Paulson Stadium • Statesboro, GA	L 23–34
September 24	Mountain West	Toledo	San Diego State	Snapdragon Stadium • San Diego, CA	L 14–17
September 24	Mountain West	Western Michigan	San Jose State	CEFCU Stadium • San Jose, CA	L 6–34

=== Mid-American vs FBS independents matchups ===
The following games include MAC teams competing against FBS Independents, which includes Army, Liberty, New Mexico State, UConn, or UMass.

Date	Visitor	Home	Site	Score
September 10	UMass	Toledo	Glass Bowl • Toledo, OH	W 55–10
September 24	Akron	Liberty	Williams Stadium • Lynchburg, VA	L 12–21
October 1	UMass	Eastern Michigan	Rynearson Stadium • Ypsilanti, MI	W 20–13
October 15	UConn	Ball State	Scheumann Stadium • Muncie, IN	W 25–21
October 15	Buffalo	UMass	Warren McGuirk Alumni Stadium • Amherst, MA	W 34–7

=== Mid-American vs. FCS matchups ===
The following games include MAC teams competing against FCS schools.

Date	Visitor	Home	Site	Score
September 1	St. Francis	Akron	InfoCision Stadium • Akron, OH	W 30–23 ^{OT}
September 1	Eastern Illinois	Northern Illinois	Huskie Stadium • DeKalb, IL	W 34–27
September 1	LIU	Toledo	Glass Bowl • Toledo, OH	W 37–0
September 2	Eastern Kentucky	Eastern Michigan	Rynearson Stadium • Ypsilanti, MI	W 42–34
September 10	Eastern Kentucky	Bowling Green	Doyt Perry Stadium • Bowling Green, OH	L 57–59 ^{7OT}
September 10	Holy Cross	Buffalo	UB Stadium • Buffalo, NY	L 31–37
September 10	Robert Morris	Miami (OH)	Yager Stadium • Oxford, OH	W 31–14
September 17	Murray State	Ball State	Scheumann Stadium • Muncie, IN	W 31–0
September 17	Bucknell	Central Michigan	Kelly/Shorts Stadium • Mount Pleasant, MI	W 41–0
September 17	LIU	Kent State	Dix Stadium • Kent, OH	W 63–10
September 24	Fordham	Ohio	Peden Stadium • Athens, OH	W 59–52
October 1	New Hampshire	Western Michigan	Waldo Stadium • Kalamazoo, MI	W 44–7

== Head to head matchups ==
2022 MAC Head to head
Team	Akron	Ball State	Buffalo	Bowling Green	Central Michigan	Eastern Michigan	Kent State	Miami	Northern Illinois	Ohio	Toledo	Western Michigan
Akron	—	—	22–23	28–31	21–28	28–34	27–33	9–27	44–12	34–55	—	—
Ball State	—	—	—	—	17–16	16–20	27–20	17–18	44–38	14–38	21–28	30–37
Buffalo	23–22	—	—	38–7	27–31	50–31	27–30	24–20	—	24–45	34–27	—
Bowling Green	31–28	—	7–38	—	34–18	—	6–40	17–13	—	14–38	42–35	13–9
Central Michigan	28–21	16–17	31–27	18–34	—	19–38	—	—	35–22	—	17–38	10–12
Eastern Michigan	34–28	20–16	31–50	—	38–19	—	31–24	—	10–39	—	24–27	45–23
Kent State	33–27	20–27	30–27	40–6	—	24–31	—	24–27	—	31–24	31–52	—
Miami	27–9	18–17	20–24	13–17	—	—	27–24	—	29–23	21–37	—	10–16
Northern Illinois	12–44	38–44	—	—	22–35	39–10	—	23–29	—	17–24	32–52	24–21
Ohio	55–34	32–18	45–24	38–14	—	—	24–31	37–21	24–17	—	—	33–14
Toledo	—	28–21	27–34	35–42	38–17	27–24	52–31	—	52–32	—	—	14–20
Western Michigan	—	37–30	—	9–13	12–10	23–45	—	16–10	21–24	14–33	20–14	—

Updated with the results of all games through December 3, 2022.

== Awards and honors ==
=== Player of the week honors ===
==== East Division ====
Week	Offensive			Defensive			Special Teams		
Week	Player	Team	Position	Player	Team	Position	Player	Team	Position
Week 1	Kurtis Rourke	Ohio	QB	Marcus Fuqua	Buffalo	S	Nathanial Vakos	Ohio	K
Week 2	Matt McDonald	Bowling Green	QB	Khalib Johns	Kent State	LB	Josh Smith	Kent State	P
Week 3	Matt McDonald (2)	Bowling Green	QB	Karl Brooks	Bowling Green	DE	Alex McNulty	Buffalo	K
Week 4	Kurtis Rourke (2)	Ohio	QB	Ryan McWood	Miami	LB	Alex McNulty (2)	Buffalo	K
Week 5	Dante Cephas	Kent State	WR	Shaun Dolac	Buffalo	LB	Tristian Vandenberg	Ohio	K
Week 6	Sieh Bangura	Ohio	RB	Ryan McWood (2)	Miami	LB	Graham Nicholson	Miami	K
Week 7	Sieh Bangura (2)	Ohio	RB	Demetrius Hardamon	Bowling Green	LB	Nathanial Vakos (2)	Ohio	K
Week 8	Ron Cook	Buffalo	RB	Marcus Fuqua (2)	Buffalo	S	Sami Sir	Bowling Green	P
Week 9	No nominees			Jacquez Warren	Miami	DB	Dom Dzioban	Miami	P
Week 10	Kurtis Rourke (3)	Ohio	QB	Keye Thompson	Ohio	LB	Ta'ron Keith	Bowling Green	RB
Week 11	Collin Schlee	Kent State	QB	Marvin Pierre	Kent State	LB	Alex McNulty (3)	Buffalo	K
Week 12	Odieu Hiliare	Bowling Green	WR	Alvin Floyd	Ohio	S	PaSean Wimberly	Bowling Green	RB
Week 13	CJ Harris	Ohio	QB	Keye Thompson (2)	Ohio	LB	Cory Smigel	Akron	K

==== West Division ====
Week	Offensive			Defensive			Special Teams		
Week	Player	Team	Position	Player	Team	Position	Player	Team	Position
Week 1	Daniel Richardson	Central Michigan	QB	Eric Rogers	Northern Illinois	CB	Mitchell Tomasek	Eastern Michigan	P
Week 2	Dequan Finn	Toledo	QB	Braden Fiske	Western Michigan	DL	Nick Mihalic	Western Michigan	P
Week 3	Samson Evans	Eastern Michigan	RB	Kempton Shine	Eastern Michigan	CB	Jesús Gómez	Eastern Michigan	K
Week 4	John Paddock	Ball State	QB	Daveren Rayner	Northern Illinois	LB	Tom Foley	Northern Illinois	P
Week 5	John Paddock (2)	Ball State	QB	Jaquan Amos	Ball State	S	Mitchell Tomasek (2)	Eastern Michigan	P
Week 6	Carson Steele	Ball State	RB	Quinyon Mitchell	Toledo	CB	Lucas Borrow	Ball State	P
Week 7	Dequan Finn (2)	Toledo	QB	Jordan Riley	Ball State	S	John Richardson	Northern Illinois	K
Week 8	Sean Tyler	Western Michigan	RB	Corvin Moment	Western Michigan	LB	Palmer Domschke	Western Michigan	K
Week 9	Tucker Gleason	Toledo	QB	Maxen Hook	Toledo	S	Mitchell Tomasek (3)	Eastern Michigan	P
Week 10	Carson Steele (2)	Ball State	RB	Cole Pearce	Ball State	LB	Ben VonGunten	Ball State	K
Week 11	Bert Emanuel, Jr.	Central Michigan	QB	Thomas Incoom	Central Michigan	DL	Mitchell Tomasek (4)	Eastern Michigan	P
Week 12	Tucker Gleason (2)	Toledo	QB	Jose Ramirez	Eastern Michigan	DE	No nominees		
Week 13	Samson Evans (2)	Eastern Michigan	RB	Jose Ramirez (2)	Eastern Michigan	DE	Mitchell Tomasek (5)	Eastern Michigan	P

=== MAC Individual Awards ===
The following individuals received postseason honors as voted by the Mid-American Conference football coaches at the end of the season.

Award	Player	School
Offensive Player of the Year	Kurtis Rourke	Ohio
Defensive Player of the Year	Jose Ramirez	Eastern Michigan
Special Teams Player of the Year	Alex McNulty	Buffalo
Freshman Player of the Year	Sieh Bangura	Ohio
Vern Smith Leadership Award	Kurtis Rourke	Ohio
Coach of the Year	Tim Albin	Ohio

=== All-Conference Teams ===
The following players were listed as part of the All-Conference teams.

Position	Player	Team
First Team Offense
WR	Alex Adams	Akron
WR	Devontez Walker	Kent State
WR	Dante Cephas	Kent State
WR	Sam Wiglusz	Ohio
OL	Sidy Sow	Eastern Michigan
OL	Marcellus Marshall	Kent State
OL	Nolan Potter	Northern Illinois
OL	Hagen Meservy	Ohio
OL	Nick Rosi	Toledo
TE	Brady Hunt	Ball State
QB	Kurtis Rourke	Ohio
RB	Carson Steele	Ball State
RB	Marquez Cooper	Kent State
PK	Alex McNulty	Buffalo
First Team Defense
DL	Karl Brooks	Bowling Green
DL	Thomas Incoom	Central Michigan
DL	Jose Ramirez	Eastern Michigan
DL	Desjuan Johnson	Toledo
LB	Bubba Arslanian	Akron
LB	Shaun Dolac	Buffalo
LB	Dallas Gant	Toledo
LB	Zaire Barnes	Western Michigan
DB	Marcus Fuqua	Buffalo
DB	Donte Kent	Central Michigan
DB	Quinyon Mitchell	Toledo
DB	Maxen Hook	Toledo
P	Mitchell Tomasek	Eastern Michigan
First Team Specialists
KRS	Jaylon Jackson	Eastern Michigan
KRS	Keegan Wilburn	Ohio

Position	Player	Team
Second Team Offense
WR	Jayshon Jackson	Ball State
WR	Odieu Hiliare	Bowling Green
WR	Mac Hippenhammer	Miami
WR	Jerjuan Newton	Toledo
WR	Corey Crooms	Western Michigan
OL	Ethan Crowe	Ball State
OL	Jamezz Kimbrough	Central Michigan
OL	Brian Dooley	Eastern Michigan
OL	Rusty Feth	Miami
OL	Sam Allan	Kent State
TE	Christian Sims	Bowling Green
QB	Dequan Finn	Toledo
RB	Samson Evans	Eastern Michigan
RB	Sean Tyler	Western Michigan
PK	Nathanial Vakos	Ohio
Second Team Defense
DL	DeVonte O'Malley	Northern Illinois
DL	Jamal Hines	Toledo
DL	Andre Carter	Western Michigan
DL	Braden Fiske	Western Michigan
LB	Clayton Coll	Ball State
LB	James Patterson	Buffalo
LB	Ryan McWood	Miami
LB	Dyontae Johnson	Toledo
DB	Amechi Uzodinma	Ball State
DB	Nic Jones	Ball State
DB	Nico Bolden	Kent State
DB	C.J. Brown	Northern Illinois
DB	Nate Bauer	Toledo
P	Dom Dzioban	Miami
Second Team Specialists
KRS	Ta'ron Keith	Bowling Green
KRS	Ja'Shaun Poke	Kent State

Position	Player	Team
Third Team Offense
WR	Shocky Jacques-Louis	Akron
WR	Quian Williams	Buffalo
WR	Tanner Knue	Eastern Michigan
WR	Hassan Beydoun	Eastern Michigan
OL	Anthony Whigan	Akron
OL	Gabe Wallace	Buffalo
OL	Desmond Bessent	Buffalo
OL	Deiyantei Powell-Woods	Central Michigan
OL	Logan Zschernitz	Northern Illinois
TE	Joel Wilson	Central Michigan
QB	DJ Irons	Akron
QB	Collin Schlee	Kent State
RB	Harrison Waylee	Northern Illinois
RB	Sieh Bangura	Ohio
PK	Jesús Gómez	Eastern Michigan
Third Team Defense
DL	Zay West	Kent State
DL	Michael Kennedy	Northern Illinois
DL	James Ester	Northern Illinois
DL	Jack McCrory	Ohio
LB	Kyle Moretti	Central Michigan
LB	Matthew Salopek	Miami
LB	Keye Thompson	Ohio
LB	Corvin Moment	Western Michigan
DB	Jordan Riley	Ball State
DB	John Saunders Jr.	Miami
DB	Tariq Drake	Ohio
DB	Keni-H Lovely	Western Michigan
P	Luke Elzinga	Central Michigan
Third Team Specialists
KRS	Jalen Walker	Miami
KRS	De'Javion Stepney	Central Michigan

== NFL draft ==
The following list includes all MAC players who were drafted in the 2023 NFL draft.

Player	Position	School	Draft Round	Round Pick	Overall Pick	Team
Sidy Sow	OG	Eastern Michigan	4	15	117	New England Patriots
Karl Brooks	DT	Bowling Green	6	2	179	Green Bay Packers
Zaire Barnes	LB	Western Michigan	6	7	184	New York Jets
Jose Ramirez	LB	Eastern Michigan	6	19	196	Tampa Bay Buccaneers
Lew Nichols III	RB	Central Michigan	7	18	235	Green Bay Packers
Nic Jones	CB	Ball State	7	33	250	Kansas City Chiefs
Desjuan Johnson	DE	Toledo	7	42	259	Los Angeles Rams
