= Sidy Sow =

American football player (born 1998)

Profile
- Position: Guard

Personal information
- Born: June 10, 1998 (age 28); Granby, Quebec, Canada
- Listed height: 6 ft 5 in (1.96 m)
- Listed weight: 318 lb (144 kg)

Career information
- High school: Champlain (Lennoxville, Quebec)
- College: Eastern Michigan (2017–2022)
- NFL draft: 2023: 4th round, 117th overall pick
- CFL draft: 2023: 6th round, 48th overall pick

Career history
- New England Patriots (2023–2024); Houston Texans (2025)

Awards and highlights
- 2× First-team All-MAC (2021, 2022); Third-team All-MAC (2020)

Career NFL statistics as of 2025
- Games played: 29
- Games started: 15
- Stats at Pro Football Reference

Cheikhe Sidy Sow (sih-TEE SOH; born June 10, 1998) is a Canadian professional football offensive tackle. He played college football for the Eastern Michigan Eagles after playing in Canada.

== Early life ==
Sow grew up in Granby, Quebec, Canada and attended Joseph-Hermas Leclerc High School. He played football at Champlain College Lennoxville.

== College career ==
Sow redshirted his true freshman season at Eastern Michigan. He started 11 games at left tackle as a redshirt freshman. Sow moved to left guard going into his redshirt sophomore season and made all 12 of the Eagles' games. He was named third-team All-Mid-American Conference (MAC) in 2020. Sow was named first-team All-MAC in each of his final two seasons. He finished his college career as Eastern Michigan's all-time leader with 56 games played and 54 starts.

== Professional career ==
Pre-draft measurables
Height	Weight	Arm length	Hand span	40-yard dash	10-yard split	20-yard split	20-yard shuttle	Three-cone drill	Vertical jump	Broad jump	Bench press
6 ft 4 3/4 in (1.95 m)	323 lb (147 kg)	33 5/8 in (0.85 m)	10 3/8 in (0.26 m)	5.07 s	1.80 s	3.01 s	4.69 s	7.62 s	32.0 in (0.81 m)	9 ft 2 in (2.79 m)	27 reps

=== New England Patriots ===
Sow was selected by the New England Patriots in the fourth round, 117th overall, of the 2023 NFL draft. He was also selected in the tenth round, 72nd overall, in the 2023 USFL draft to the Michigan Panthers and in the sixth round (48th overall) of the 2023 CFL draft by the Saskatchewan Roughriders. As a rookie, he appeared in 15 games and started 13.

On August 22, 2025, Sow was released by the Patriots as part of preliminary roster cuts.

=== Houston Texans ===
On September 3, 2025, Sow was signed to the Houston Texans' practice squad. On January 20, 2026, he signed a reserve/futures contract with Houston. On June 1, Sow was waived by the Texans.
