= 2022 Western Michigan Broncos football team =

American college football season

2022 Western Michigan Broncos football
- Conference: Mid-American Conference
- West Division
- Record: 5–7 (4–4 MAC)
- Head coach: Tim Lester (6th season)
- Offensive coordinator: Jeff Thorne (1st season)
- Offensive scheme: West Coast
- Defensive coordinator: Lou Esposito (6th season)
- Base defense: 4–2–5
- Home stadium: Waldo Stadium

2022 Mid-American Conference football standings
	Conf.			Overall
Team	W		L	W		L
East Division
Ohio xy	7	–	1	10	–	4
Buffalo	5	–	3	7	–	6
Bowling Green	5	–	3	6	–	7
Miami (OH)	4	–	4	6	–	7
Kent State	4	–	4	5	–	7
Akron	1	–	7	2	–	10
West Division
Toledo xy$	5	–	3	9	–	5
Eastern Michigan x	5	–	3	9	–	4
Western Michigan	4	–	4	5	–	7
Ball State	3	–	5	5	–	7
Central Michigan	3	–	5	4	–	8
Northern Illinois	2	–	6	3	–	9
Championship: Toledo 17, Ohio 7
$ – Conference champion; x – Division champion/co-champions; y – Championship game participant; Rankings from AP Poll

The 2022 Western Michigan Broncos football team represented Western Michigan University in the 2022 NCAA Division I FBS football season. The Broncos played their home games at Waldo Stadium in Kalamazoo, Michigan, and competed in the West Division of the Mid-American Conference (MAC). The team was led by sixth-year head coach Tim Lester. The Broncos finished the season 5–7 and 4–4 in MAC play. After the season, Lester was fired.

== Schedule ==
Date	Time	Opponent	Site	TV	Result	Attendance
September 2	7:00 p.m.	at No. 15 Michigan State*	Spartan Stadium; East Lansing, MI	ESPN2	L 13–35	73,928
September 10	2:00 p.m.	at Ball State	Scheumann Stadium; Muncie, IN	ESPN+	W 37–30	12,972
September 17	7:30 p.m.	No. 23 Pittsburgh*	Waldo Stadium; Kalamazoo, MI	ESPNU	L 13–34	22,875
September 24	7:30 p.m.	at San Jose State*	CEFCU Stadium; San Jose, CA	CBSSN	L 6–34	17,058
October 1	6:00 p.m.	New Hampshire*	Waldo Stadium; Kalamazoo, MI	ESPN3	W 44–7	20,119
October 8	12:00 p.m.	Eastern Michigan	Waldo Stadium; Kalamazoo, MI (Michigan MAC Trophy)	CBSSN	L 23–45	10,876
October 15	3:30 p.m.	Ohio^{†}	Waldo Stadium; Kalamazoo, MI	CBSSN	L 14–33	20,320
October 22	3:30 p.m.	at Miami (OH)	Yager Stadium; Oxford, OH	CBSSN	W 16–10	21,618
November 2	7:00 p.m.	at Bowling Green	Doyt Perry Stadium; Bowling Green, OH	ESPN2	L 9–13	7,589
November 9	7:00 p.m.	Northern Illinois	Waldo Stadium; Kalamazoo, MI	ESPNU	L 21–24	8,722
November 16	8:00 p.m.	at Central Michigan	Kelly/Shorts Stadium; Mount Pleasant, MI (rivalry, Michigan MAC Trophy)	ESPNU	W 12–10	10,097
November 25	12:00 p.m.	Toledo	Waldo Stadium; Kalamazoo, MI	ESPNU	W 20–14	8,645
*Non-conference game; ^{†}Homecoming; Rankings from AP Poll released prior to the game; All times are in Eastern time

== Game summaries ==
=== at No. 15 Michigan State ===
Week One: Western Michigan at No. 15 Michigan State – Game summary

Quarter	1	2	3	4	Total
Western Michigan	3	0	10	0	13
No. 15 Michigan State	7	14	0	14	35

at Spartan Stadium • East Lansing, MI

- Date: September 2, 2022
- Game time: 7:04 p.m.
- Game weather: 82 °F (28 °C), Sunny
- Game attendance: 73,928
- Referee: Kole Knueppel
- TV announcers (ESPN2): Roy Philpott (play-by-play), Andre Ware (analyst), Paul Carcaterra (sideline)

Game information

First Quarter

- (06:31) WMU FG: Palmer Domschke 27-yard field goal
  WMU 3–0; 10 plays, 66 yards, 4:57
- (04:37) MSU TD: Germie Bernard 44-yard pass from Payton Thorne (Jack Stone kick)
  MSU 7–3; 6 plays, 75 yards, 01:54

Second Quarter

- (14:55) MSU TD: Daniel Barker 13-yard pass from Payton Thorne (Jack Stone kick)
  MSU 14–3; 7 plays 45 yards, 2:21
- (12:26) MSU TD: Keon Coleman 41-yard pass from Payton Thorne (Jack Stone kick)
  MSU 21–3; 2 plays, 50 yards, 0:44

Third Quarter

- (08:20) WMU TD: Sean Tyler 4-yard run (Palmer Doschke kick)
  MSU 21–10; 7 plays, 67 yards, 3:43
- (00:49) WMU FG: Palmer Domschke 42-yard field goal
  MSU 21–13; 10 plays, 48 yards, 4:40

Fourth Quarter

- (06:28) MSU TD: Jalen Berger 1-yard run (Jack Stone kick)
  MSU 28–13; 8 plays, 91 yards, 3:48
- (04:07) MSU TD: Tre Mosley 43-yard pass from Payton Thorne (Jack Stone kick)
  MSU 35–13; 1 play, 43 yards, 0:06

Passing

- WMU – Jack Salopek: 21/36, 193 yards
- MSU – Payton Thorne: 12/24, 233 yards, 4 TD, 1 INT

Rushing

- WMU – Sean Taylor: 13 carries, 80 yards, 1 TD
- MSU – Jalen Berger: 16 carries, 120 yards, 1 TD

Receiving

- WMU – Jehlani Galloway: 4 receptions, 70 yards
- MSU – Keon Coleman: 4 receptions, 84 yards, 1 TD

=== at Ball State ===
Western Michigan Broncos at Ball State Cardinals

Team	1	2	3	4	Total
• Broncos	7	7	7	16	37
Cardinals	10	6	7	7	30

- Date: September 10, 2022
- Location: Scheumann Stadium
  Muncie, IN
- Game start: 2:00 p.m. EDT
- Elapsed time: 2 hours and 16 minutes
- Game attendance: 12,972
- Game weather: Sunny, 84 °F (29 °C)
- Referee: Billy Williams
- TV announcers (ESPN+): Michael Reghi (play-by-play), Ryan Cavanaugh (analyst)

Statistics	Western Michigan	Ball State
First downs	27	21
Total yards	437	447
Rushing yards	207	146
Passing yards	230	301
Turnovers	2	1
Time of possession	34:16	25:44

Team	Category	Player	Statistics
Western Michigan	Passing	Jack Salopek	25/43, 230 yards, 1 TD, 1 INT
Western Michigan	Rushing	Sean Tyler	15 carries, 108 yards, 1 TD
Western Michigan	Receiving	Corey Crooms	10 receptions, 102 yards, 1 TD
Ball State	Passing	John Paddock	24/41, 301 yards, 2 TD
Ball State	Rushing	Carson Steele	26 carries, 137 yards, 1 TD
Ball State	Receiving	Amir Abdur-Rahman	7 receptions, 89 yards, 1 TD

=== No. 23 Pittsburgh ===
No. 23 Pittsburgh Panthers (1–1) vs Western Michigan Broncos (1–1) – Game summary

Quarter	1	2	3	4	Total
No. 23 Panthers	10	3	7	14	34
Broncos	3	3	7	0	13

at Waldo Stadium • Kalamazoo, MI

- Date: September 17th
- Game time: 7:30 p.m. EST/4:30 p.m. PST
- Game weather: Temperature: 80 °F (27 °C) • Wind: SW at 10 miles per hour (16 km/h) • Weather: Sunny
- Game attendance: 22,875
- Referee: Jerry Magallanes
- TV announcers (ESPNU): Clay Matvick (play-by-play), Rocky Boiman (analyst), Dawn Davenport (field reporter)

=== at San Jose State ===
	1	2	3	4	Total
Broncos	0	0	6	0	6
Spartans	3	14	7	10	34

=== New Hampshire ===
	1	2	3	4	Total
Wildcats	0	7	0	0	7
Broncos	21	7	3	13	44

=== Eastern Michigan ===
	1	2	3	4	Total
Eagles	14	21	7	3	45
Broncos	0	7	9	7	23

=== Ohio ===
Ohio Bobcats (3–3, 1–1) vs. Western Michigan Broncos (2–4, 1–1)

Quarter	1	2	3	4	Total
Ohio	7	13	0	13	33
Western Michigan	7	7	0	0	14

at Waldo Stadium • Kalamazoo, MI

- Date: Saturday, October 16, 2022
- Game time: 3:30 p.m. EDT
- Game weather: sunny, Temperature:49 °F (9 °C)
- Game attendance: 20,320
- Referee: Matt Packowski
- TV announcers (CBSSN): John Sadak, Randy Cross
- box score, Ohio notes

Game information

First Quarter

- (08:44) OHIO – Bangura, Sieh 1 yd run (Vakos, Nathanial kick) 12 plays, 75 yards, TOP 06:16 (OHIO 7–0)
- (04:23) WMU – Salopek, Jack 8 yd run (Domschke, Palmer kick) 8 plays, 64 yards, TOP 04:15 (Tied 7–7)

Second Quarter

- (12:59) OHIO – Bangura, Sieh 6 yd run (Vakos, Nathanial kick) 11 plays, 75 yards, TOP 06:24 (OHIO 14–7)
- (01:50) OHIO – Vakos, Nathanial 26 yd field goal 9 plays, 52 yards, TOP 03:17 (OHIO 17–7)
- (01:05) WMU – Crooms, Corey 74 yd pass from Salopek, Jack (Domschke, Palmer kick) 2 plays, 75 yards, TOP 00:45 (Tied 17–14)
- (00:06) OHIO – Vakos, Nathanial 55 yd field goal 5 plays, 22 yards, TOP 00:59 (OHIO 20–14)

Third Quarter

- No scoring plays

Fourth Quarter

- (13:48) OHIO – Vakos, Nathanial 33 yd field goal 4 plays, 1 yards, TOP 00:25 (OHIO 23–14)
- (07:24) OHIO – Rourke, Kurtis 1 yd run (Vakos, Nathanial kick) 2 plays, 8 yards, TOP 00:48 (OHIO 30–14)
- (03:11) OHIO – Vakos, Nathanial 35 yd field goal 7 plays, 41 yards, TOP 03:32 (OHIO 33–14)

Statistics	OHIO	WMU
First downs	17	17
Total yards	383	333
Rushes/yards	35/119	31/84
Passing yards	264	249
Passing: Comp–Att–Int	22–34–1	17–31–5
Time of possession	33:20	26:40

Team	Category	Player	Statistics
Ohio	Passing	Kurtis Rourke	22/34, 264 yards, 1 INT
Ohio	Rushing	Sieh Bangura	25 rushes, 77 yards, 2 TD
Ohio	Receiving	Sam Wiglusz	8 receptions, 76 yards
Western Michigan	Passing	Jack Salopek	17/31, 249 yards, 1 TD, 5 INT
Western Michigan	Rushing	Sean Tyler	19 rushes, 84 yards
Western Michigan	Receiving	Corey Crooms	5 receptions, 87 yards, 1 TD

=== at Miami (OH) ===
	1	2	3	4	Total
Broncos	0	6	10	0	16
RedHawks	3	0	0	7	10

=== at Bowling Green ===
	1	2	3	4	Total
Broncos	0	0	6	3	9
Falcons	0	6	7	0	13

=== Northern Illinois ===
	1	2	3	4	Total
Huskies	3	7	7	7	24
Broncos	7	7	7	0	21

=== at Central Michigan ===
	1	2	3	4	Total
Broncos	7	0	0	5	12
Chippewas	7	0	3	0	10

=== Toledo ===
	1	2	3	4	Total
Rockets	0	7	0	7	14
Broncos	0	10	10	0	20

== Players drafted into the NFL ==
Round	Pick	Player	Position	NFL Club
6	184	Zaire Barnes	LB	New York Jets
