= Jose Ramirez (gridiron football) =

American gridiron football player (born 1999)

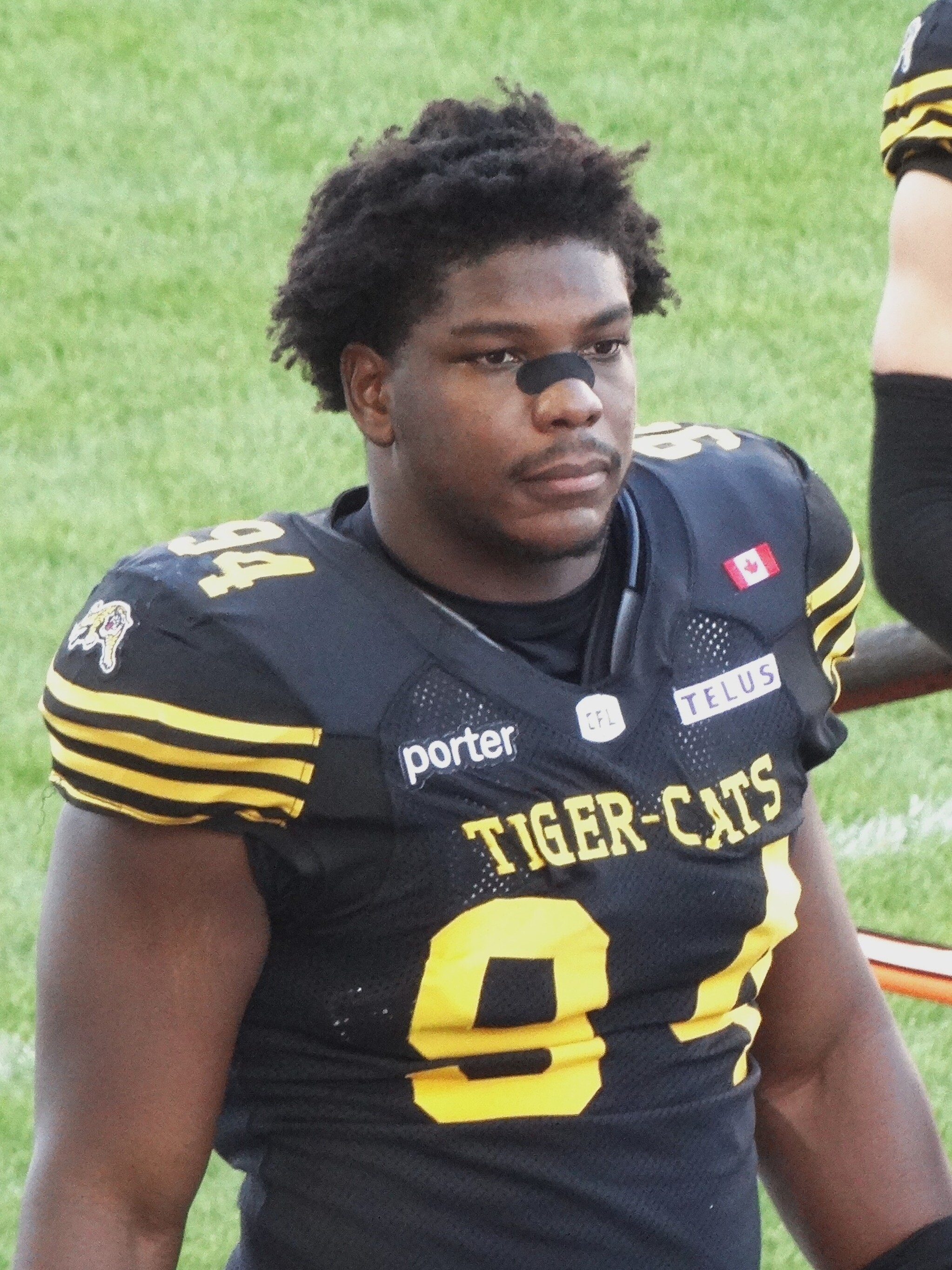
- Ramirez with the Hamilton Tiger-Cats in 2025

Profile
- Position: Outside linebacker

Personal information
- Born: May 9, 1999 (age 27); Lake Alfred, Florida, U.S.
- Listed height: 6 ft 2 in (1.88 m)
- Listed weight: 252 lb (114 kg)

Career information
- High school: Auburndale (Auburndale, Florida)
- College: Arizona (2017); Riverside City (2018); Eastern Michigan (2019–2022)
- NFL draft: 2023: 6th round, 196th overall pick

Career history
- Tampa Bay Buccaneers (2023–2024); Hamilton Tiger-Cats (2025); Philadelphia Eagles (2026)*; New England Patriots (2026)
- * Offseason or practice squad member only

Awards and highlights
- MAC Defensive Player of the Year (2022); 2× third-team All-MAC (2020, 2021)
- Stats at Pro Football Reference
- Stats at CFL.ca

Jose Ramirez (born May 9, 1999) is an American professional football outside linebacker. He played college football for the Eastern Michigan Eagles. He also played for the Tampa Bay Buccaneers of the NFL and the Hamilton Tiger-Cats of the Canadian Football League (CFL).

== Early life ==
Ramirez grew up in Lake Alfred, Florida, and attended Auburndale High School. He played wide receiver, cornerback, safety and linebacker for the football team. A three-star recruit, he served as team captain as a senior and earned all-state honors. On December 24, 2016, Ramirez committed to play college football at Arizona after having previously committed to South Alabama earlier in the month.

== College career ==
Ramirez did not play any games for Arizona in 2017. Instead, he transferred to Riverside City College and played 12 games for the Tigers in 2018. He committed to Eastern Michigan Eagles on February 6, 2019.

At Eastern Michigan, Ramirez tallied 155 tackles, 33 being for a loss, 20.5 sacks, seven pass deflections, one fumble recovery, and five forced fumbles. He was named third-team all-Mid-American Conference (MAC) twice in 2020 and 2021. His best year came during the 2022 season where he put up 66 tackles, 19.5 going for a loss, a school-record 12 sacks, two pass deflections, one fumble recovery, and two forced fumbles. Ramirez recorded a school-record four sacks in a 45–23 victory over in-state rivals Western Michigan. For his efforts he was named the MAC Defensive Player of the Year, as well as a first team all-MAC selection. Ramirez was selected to play in the East–West Shrine Bowl.

== Professional career ==
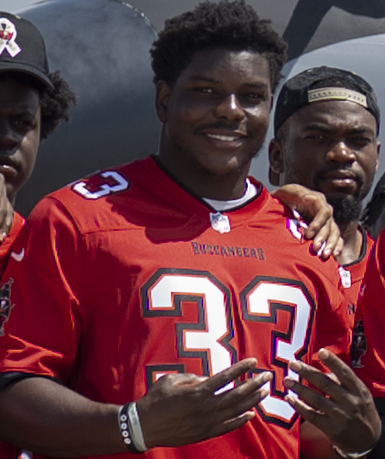
Ramirez with the Tampa Bay Buccaneers in 2023

Pre-draft measurables
Height	Weight	Arm length	Hand span	Wingspan	40-yard dash	10-yard split	20-yard split	20-yard shuttle	Three-cone drill	Vertical jump	Broad jump	Bench press
6 ft 1 7/8 in (1.88 m)	242 lb (110 kg)	32 3/4 in (0.83 m)	8 3/4 in (0.22 m)	6 ft 6 5/8 in (2.00 m)	4.73 s	1.63 s	2.72 s	4.30 s	6.95 s	34.5 in (0.88 m)	9 ft 10 in (3.00 m)	21 reps
All values from the NFL Combine

=== Tampa Bay Buccaneers ===
Ramirez was selected in the sixth round (196th overall) of the 2023 NFL draft by the Tampa Bay Buccaneers. He was waived on August 29, 2023, and re-signed to the practice squad. He signed a reserve/future contract on January 23, 2024. Ramirez played in four games during the 2024 season, appearing in 30 snaps on defense and 40 snaps on special teams.

On August 26, 2025, Ramirez was waived by the Buccaneers as part of final roster cuts.

=== Hamilton Tiger-Cats ===
On September 24, 2025, Ramirez signed with the Hamilton Tiger-Cats. He played in three regular season games where he had four defensive tackles and one sack. He was released in the following offseason on January 14, 2026, to pursue an NFL opportunity.

=== Philadelphia Eagles ===
Ramirez signed a reserve/future contact with the Philadelphia Eagles on January 15, 2026. He was waived by the Eagles as a part of final roster cuts on August 30.

=== New England Patriots ===
On September 1, 2026, Ramirez signed with the New England Patriots' practice squad. He was promoted to the active roster on September 23. On October 6, Ramirez was released and re-signed to the practice squad two days later. On October 13, he was released. He was re-signed to the practice squad on October 26. On November 9, Ramirez was released.

== Personal life ==
Ramirez is of Dominican Republic descent.
