= Mike Hallett (American football) =

American football player and coach (born 1968)

Michael (Mike) Hallett
Current position
- Title: Offensive Coordinator / OL
- Team: Gannon University

Biographical details
- Born: December 5, 1968 (age 57); Orrville, Ohio, U.S.

Playing career
- 1992–1993: Mount Union
- Position: Defensive quarterback

Coaching career (HC unless noted)
- 1988–1989: Orrville HS (OH) (assistant)
- 1994–1996: Coventry HS (OH) (assistant)
- 1997–1998: Wooster (assistant)
- 1999–2003: Thomas More (assistant)
- 2004–2006: Thomas More
- 2007–2015: Heidelberg
- 2016–2019: Toledo (OL)
- 2020–2025: Toledo (co-OC/OL)
- 2026-Present: Gannon (OC/OL)

Head coaching record
- Overall: 70–51
- Tournaments: 0–1

Accomplishments and honors

Awards
- OAC Coach of the Year (2011)

Mike Hallett (born December 5, 1968) is an American football coach. Is currently the offensive coordinator / offensive line coach at Gannon University. He also recently was the co-offensive coordinator and offensive line coach at the University of Toledo. He notably did a backflip at the Mudhen stadium, in 2004. Hallett was head coach at Thomas More College in Crestview Hills, Kentucky from 2004 to 2006 and at Heidelberg College from 2007 to 2015.

== Head coaching record ==
Year	Team	Overall	Conference	Standing	Bowl/playoffs	D3^{#}
Thomas More Saints (NCAA Division III independent) (2004)
2004	Thomas More	4–6				
Thomas More Saints (Presidents' Athletic Conference) (2005–2006)
2005	Thomas More	5–5	4–2	3rd		
2006	Thomas More	6–4	2–4	T–4th		
Thomas More:		15–15	6–6			
Heidelberg Student Princes (Ohio Athletic Conference) (2007–2015)
2007	Heidelberg	4–6	3–6	T–7th		
2008	Heidelberg	4–6	3–6	8th		
2009	Heidelberg	4–6	3–6	T–6th		
2010	Heidelberg	5–5	4–5	7th		
2011	Heidelberg	8–2	7–2	T–2nd		
2012	Heidelberg	9–2	8–1	2nd	L NCAA Division III First Round	19
2013	Heidelberg	8–2	7–2	3rd		21
2014	Heidelberg	8–2	7–2	3rd		
2015	Heidelberg	5–5	5–4	5th		
Heidelberg:		55–36	47–34			
Total:		136–57				
^{#}Rankings from D3football.com.
