= Mac Hippenhammer =

American football player (born 1998)

Profile
- Position: Wide receiver

Personal information
- Born: November 5, 1998 (age 28); Virginia, U.S.
- Listed height: 5 ft 11 in (1.80 m)
- Listed weight: 177 lb (80 kg)

Career information
- High school: R. Nelson Snider (Fort Wayne, Indiana)
- College: Penn State (2017–2019); Miami (OH) (2020–2022)
- NFL draft: 2023: undrafted

Career history
- Cincinnati Bengals (2023)*
- * Offseason or practice squad member only

Awards and highlights
- Second-team All-MAC (2022); Third-team All-MAC (2021)

Mac Elijah Hippenhammer (born November 5, 1998) is an American former football wide receiver. He played college football at Penn State and Miami (OH). He was signed by the Cincinnati Bengals as an undrafted free agent in 2023.

== Early life ==
Hippenhammer grew up in Fort Wayne, Indiana and attended R. Nelson Snider High School where he lettered in football and baseball. He was a three-star rated recruit and would commit to play college football and baseball at Penn State University.

== College career ==
=== Penn State ===
Hippenhammer was redshirted during his true freshman season in 2017. During the 2018 football season, he played in 12 games, totaling 6 receptions, 103 yards, and 1 touchdown. During the 2019 football season, he played in 8 games. He had 1 reception for 15 yards.

=== Miami (OH) ===
On April 15, 2020, Hippenhammer announced that he would transfer to Miami (OH) and would play both football and baseball there. During the 2020 football season, Hippenhammer played 1 game, where he had 1 reception for 5 yards. During the 2021 football season, he saw increased production, playing in 12 games total. He had 12 receptions for 48 yards and 5 touchdowns. He had his best college season in 2022, playing in 13 games. He had 54 receptions for 769 yards and 9 touchdowns.

== Professional career ==
Pre-draft measurables
Height	Weight	Arm length	Hand span	40-yard dash	10-yard split	20-yard split	20-yard shuttle	Three-cone drill	Vertical jump	Broad jump
5 ft 11 1/4 in (1.81 m)	177 lb (80 kg)	30 in (0.76 m)	8 5/8 in (0.22 m)	4.58 s	1.66 s	2.57 s	4.19 s	7.09 s	32.5 in (0.83 m)	9 ft 6 in (2.90 m)
All values from Pro Day

After going undrafted in the 2023 NFL draft, on May 13, 2023, Hippenhammer signed a 3-year, $2.695 million contract with the Cincinnati Bengals. He was waived on August 30, 2023.
