= 2023 Quick Lane Bowl =

Postseason college football bowl game

- 9th Quick Lane Bowl
Bowling Green Falcons	Minnesota Golden Gophers
(7–5)	(5–7)
MAC	Big Ten
24	30
Head coach: Scot Loeffler	Head coach: P. J. Fleck
	1	2	3	4	Total
Bowling Green	7	3	0	14	24
Minnesota	6	3	14	7	30
- Date: December 26, 2023
- Season: 2023
- Stadium: Ford Field
- Location: Detroit, Michigan
- MVP: Darius Taylor (RB, Minnesota)
- Favorite: Minnesota by 3.5
- Referee: Tim Rich (AAC)
- Attendance: 28,521

United States TV coverage
- Network: ESPN
- Announcers: Connor Onion (play-by-play), Dustin Fox (analyst), and Tori Petry (sideline)

The 2023 Quick Lane Bowl was a college football bowl game played on December 26, 2023, at Ford Field in Detroit, Michigan. The ninth annual Quick Lane Bowl game featured the Minnesota Golden Gophers from the Big Ten Conference and the Bowling Green Falcons from the Mid-American Conference (MAC). The game began at approximately 2:00 p.m. EST and was aired on ESPN. The Quick Lane Bowl was one of the 2023–24 bowl games concluding the 2023 FBS football season. This was the final game under the title sponsor automotive chain Quick Lane Tire and Auto Center.

== Teams ==
Consistent with conference tie-ins, the bowl featured the Bowling Green Falcons of the Mid-American Conference (MAC) and the Minnesota Golden Gophers of the Big Ten Conference.

This was the fifth meeting between Bowling Green and Minnesota; entering the game, the all-time series was tied at 2–2.

=== Bowling Green Falcons ===
The Falcons entered the game with a 7–5 record (5–3 in the MAC), having finished in third place in their conference's East Division.

This was Bowling Green's second Quick Lane Bowl, making the Falcons the second team (after Minnesota) to appear in multiple Quick Lane Bowls. The Falcons previously lost the 2022 edition to New Mexico State.

=== Minnesota Golden Gophers ===
The Golden Gophers entered the game with a 5–7 record (3–6 in the Big Ten), having finished tied for fourth place in their conference's West Division. Under normal circumstances, a losing record would make Minnesota bowl-ineligible; however, because of insufficient bowl-eligible teams to fill all bowl berths, the Golden Gophers received a berth due to having the highest Academic Progress Rate (APR) among 5–7 teams.

This was Minnesota's third Quick Lane Bowl, giving them the most appearances in the game. The Golden Gophers previously became the first team both to appear in and to win multiple Quick Lane Bowls, having won the 2015 edition (which they also entered with a 5–7 record) and the 2018 edition.

== Game summary ==
2023 Quick Lane Bowl

Quarter	1	2	3	4	Total
Bowling Green	7	3	0	14	24
Minnesota	6	3	14	7	30

at Ford Field • Detroit, Michigan

- Date: Tuesday, December 26, 2023
- Game time: 2:00 p.m. EST
- Game weather: N/A (indoor stadium)
- Game attendance: 28,521
- Referee: Tim Rich
- TV announcers (ESPN): Connor Onion (play-by-play), Dustin Fox (analyst), and Tori Petry (sideline)
- Box score

Game information

First Quarter

- (13:47) BGSU – Odieu Hiliare 46 yard pass from Connor Bazelak, Alan Anaya kick (Drive: 3 plays, 75 yards, 1:13; Bowling Green 7–0)
- (5:56) MINN – Elijah Spencer 4 yard pass from Cole Kramer, two-point run conversion failed (Drive: 13 plays, 75 yards, 7:51; Bowling Green 7–6)

Second Quarter

- (8:57) MINN – Dragan Kesich 31 yard field goal (Drive: 7 plays, 42 yards, 2:58; Minnesota 9–7)
- (1:38) BGSU – Alan Anaya 33 yard field goal (Drive: 4 plays, 0 yards, 1:02; Bowling Green 10–9)

Third Quarter

- (9:20) MINN – Cole Kramer 1 yard run, Dragan Kesich kick (Drive: 11 plays, 78 yards, 5:40; Minnesota 16–10)
- (4:18) MINN – Jameson Geers 7 yard pass from Cole Kramer, Dragan Keisch kick (Drive: 6 plays, 27 yards, 3:31; Minnesota 23–10)

Fourth Quarter

- (11:10) BGSU – PaSean Wimberly 18 yard run, Alan Anaya kick (Drive: 7 plays, 80 yards, 3:29; Minnesota 23–17)
- (8:03) MINN – Darius Taylor 17 yard run, Dragan Kesich kick (Drive: 5 plays, 48 yards, 3:07; Minnesota 30–17)
- (2:33) BGSU – Connor Bazelak 2 yard run (Alan Anaya kick) Drive: 14 plays, 75 yards, 5:30; Minnesota 30–24)

=== Statistics ===
Statistics	BGSU	MINN
First downs	18	19
Plays–yards	60–303	60–281
Rushes–yards	21–82	44–255
Passing yards	221	26
Passing: comp–att–int	22–39–0	8–16–1
Time of possession	26:38	33:22

Team	Category	Player	Statistics
Bowling Green	Passing	Connor Bazelak	22/38, 221 yards, 1 TD
Bowling Green	Rushing	Pasean Wimberly	3 carries, 63 yards, 1 TD
Bowling Green	Receiving	Odieu Hiliare	10 receptions, 152 yards, 1 TD
Minnesota	Passing	Cole Kramer	8/16, 26 yards, 2 TD 1 INT
Minnesota	Rushing	Darius Taylor	35 carries, 208 yards, 1 TD
Minnesota	Receiving	Darius Taylor	2 receptions, 11 yards
