= GameAbove Sports Bowl =

College football bowl game

GameAbove Sports Bowl (defunct)
- Stadium: Ford Field
- Location: Detroit, Michigan
- Operated: 2014–2025
- Conference tie-ins: Big Ten, MAC
- Previous conference tie-ins: ACC (2014–2019)
- Payout: US$2 million (2019)
- Website: gameabovesportsbowl.com
- Preceded by: Little Caesars Pizza Bowl

Sponsors
- Ford Motor Company (2014–2023); GameAbove Sports (2024–2025)

2025 matchup
- Central Michigan vs. Northwestern (Northwestern 34–7)

The GameAbove Sports Bowl was a post-season college football bowl game certified by the NCAA that began play in the 2014 season. The game was previously known as the Quick Lane Bowl with Ford Motor Company serving as title sponsor of the game for 10 years, through its auto shop brand Quick Lane. That sponsorship ended in June 2024. In October 2024, strategic investment company GameAbove, through its GameAbove Sports brand, was announced as the game's new title sponsor.

Backed by the Detroit Lions of the National Football League, the game features a bowl-eligible team from the Big Ten Conference competing against an opponent from the Mid-American Conference (MAC). The bowl is played at Ford Field in Detroit and was created as a de facto replacement for the Little Caesars Pizza Bowl (last played in 2013), and inherited its traditional December 26 scheduling. Unlike its predecessor, which featured the eighth-place team in the Big Ten against the MAC champion, competing teams are selected by conference representatives and are not based on final rankings.

== History ==
Beginning in 2002, Detroit's Ford Field had played host to the Motor City Bowl (later known as the Little Caesars Pizza Bowl for sponsorship reasons), a bowl game between the 8th placed team in the Big Ten Conference and the champion of the Mid-American Conference (MAC), which was first played in 1997 at the Pontiac Silverdome. In May 2013, ESPN reported that the Detroit Lions were planning to organize a new Big Ten bowl game at Ford Field against an Atlantic Coast Conference (ACC) opponent. Big Ten commissioner Jim Delany had expressed a desire to revamp the conference's lineup of bowl games for the 2014 season to keep them "fresh". In August 2013, the Lions officially confirmed the new, then-unnamed game, tentatively scheduled for December 30, 2014. The team had reached six-year deals with the Big Ten and ACC to provide tie-ins for the game, with the teams playing in the bowl being picked by representatives from each participating conference.

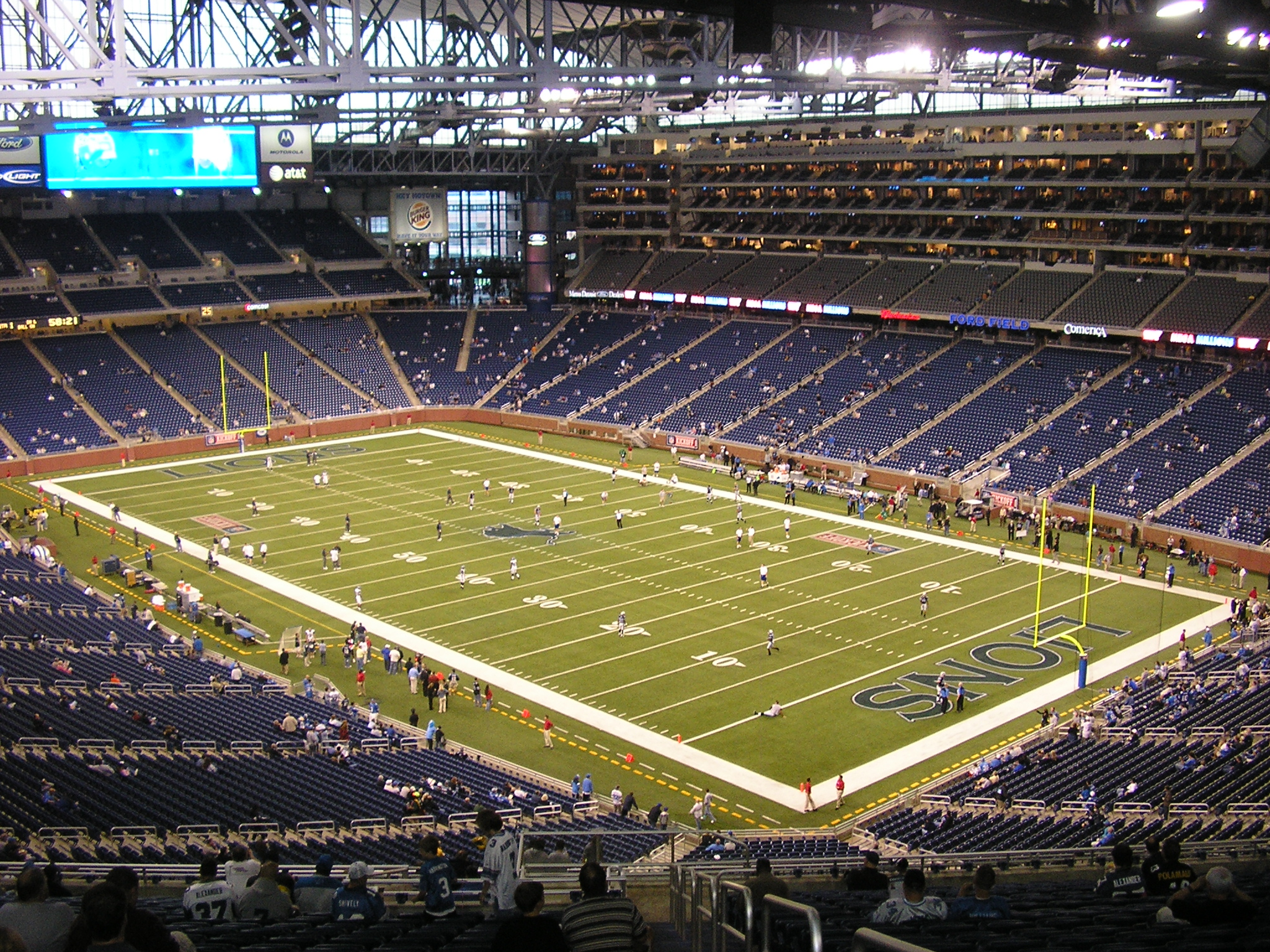
Ford Field, prior venue of the defunct Little Caesars Pizza Bowl and then the venue of the GameAbove Sports Bowl

The announcement of the Lions' bowl game, and the Little Caesars Pizza Bowl's loss of Ford Field as a venue, left the fate of the Little Caesars Pizza Bowl—which had a relatively lower-profile matchup—in jeopardy. Detroit Lions president Tom Lewand remarked that "very few" markets could adequately support hosting two major bowl games. Organizers were open to the possibility of moving the Little Caesars Pizza Bowl across the street to Comerica Park, home stadium of the Detroit Tigers, for 2014 as an outdoor game. Comerica Park, the Tigers, and game sponsor Little Caesars are all owned by Ilitch Holdings. However, these plans never came to fruition.

In August 2014, the Lions announced that the Ford Motor Company had acquired title sponsorship rights to the new Detroit bowl, making it the Quick Lane Bowl (named for its auto shop brand, Quick Lane). It was also confirmed that the inaugural edition of the bowl would inherit the Little Caesars Pizza Bowl's traditional date of December 26, and be televised by ESPN. In a statement to Crain's Detroit Business, Motor City Bowl co-founder Ken Hoffman confirmed that "there is no Pizza Bowl for 2014. We will have to see about the future", implying that the Little Caesars Pizza Bowl had been cancelled indefinitely. The December 2013 playing proved to be the final edition of the Little Caesars Pizza Bowl.

On October 21, 2014, bowl organizers announced a secondary tie-in with the MAC. The inaugural edition of the bowl was played on December 26, 2014, between the Rutgers Scarlet Knights of the Big Ten and North Carolina Tar Heels of the ACC.

In the midst of the COVID-19 pandemic, the 2020 edition of the bowl was not played, although a specific reason was not given by organizers.

In June 2024, Quick Lane sponsorship ended. For several months, the organizers used "Detroit Bowl" as a working title. On October 8, 2024, strategic investment company GameAbove, through its GameAbove Sports brand, was announced as the game's new title sponsor, making it the GameAbove Sports Bowl.

The 2024 edition of the bowl took six overtime periods to decide, setting a new record for the most overtime periods in an FBS bowl game. It broke the prior record of five overtime periods, which had been set just two days prior in the 2024 Hawaii Bowl.

On February 10, 2026, it was reported that the bowl would be cancelled after 11 editions of the game.

== Game results ==
Date	Bowl name	Winning team		Losing team		Attendance
December 26, 2014	Quick Lane Bowl	Rutgers	40	North Carolina	21	23,876
December 28, 2015	Quick Lane Bowl	Minnesota	21	Central Michigan	14	34,217
December 26, 2016	Quick Lane Bowl	Boston College	36	Maryland	30	19,117
December 26, 2017	Quick Lane Bowl	Duke	36	Northern Illinois	14	20,211
December 26, 2018	Quick Lane Bowl	Minnesota	34	Georgia Tech	10	27,228
December 26, 2019	Quick Lane Bowl	Pittsburgh	34	Eastern Michigan	30	34,765
2020	Quick Lane Bowl	Canceled				
December 27, 2021	Quick Lane Bowl	Western Michigan	52	Nevada	24	22,321
December 26, 2022	Quick Lane Bowl	New Mexico State	24	Bowling Green	19	22,987
December 26, 2023	Quick Lane Bowl	Minnesota	30	Bowling Green	24	28,521
December 26, 2024	GameAbove Sports Bowl	Toledo	48	Pittsburgh	46 (6OT)	26,219
December 26, 2025	GameAbove Sports Bowl	Northwestern	34	Central Michigan	7	27,857

== MVPs ==
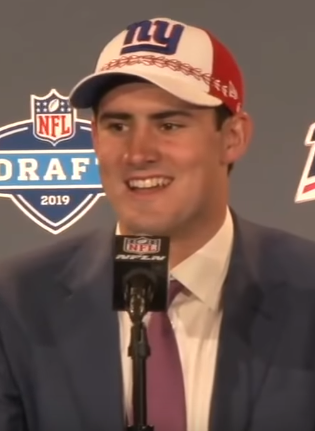
2017 Quick Lane Bowl MVP Daniel Jones

Year	MVP	Team	Position	Ref.
2014	Josh Hicks	Rutgers	RB	
2015	Mitch Leidner	Minnesota	QB	
2016	Defensive Line	Boston College	DL	
2017	Daniel Jones	Duke	QB	
2018	Mohamed Ibrahim	Minnesota	RB	
2019	Kenny Pickett	Pittsburgh	QB	
2021	Sean Tyler	Western Michigan	RB	
2022	Diego Pavia	New Mexico State	QB	
2023	Darius Taylor	Minnesota	RB	
2024	Junior Vandeross III	Toledo	WR	
2025	Griffin Wilde	Northwestern	WR	

== Most appearances ==
Updated through the December 2025 edition (11 games, 22 total appearances).

Teams with multiple appearances

Rank	Team	Appearances	Record
1	Minnesota	3	3–0
2	Pittsburgh	2	1–1
2	Central Michigan	2	0–2
2	Bowling Green	2	0–2

Teams with a single appearance

Won (7): Boston College, Duke, New Mexico State, Northwestern, Rutgers, Toledo, Western Michigan
Lost (6): Eastern Michigan, Georgia Tech, Maryland, Nevada, North Carolina, Northern Illinois

== Appearances by conference ==
Updated through the December 2025 edition (11 games, 22 total appearances).

Conference	Record				Appearances by season	
Conference	Games	W	L	Win pct.	Won	Lost
MAC	8	2	6	.250	2021, 2024	2015, 2017, 2019, 2022, 2023, 2025
Big Ten	6	5	1	.833	2014, 2015, 2018, 2023, 2025	2016
ACC	6	3	3	.500	2016, 2017, 2019	2014, 2018, 2024
Independents	1	1	0	1.000	2022	
Mountain West	1	0	1	.000		2021

- Independent appearances: New Mexico State (2022)

== Game records ==
Team	Record, Team vs. Opponent	Year
Most points scored (one team)	52, Western Michigan vs. Nevada	2021
Most points scored (losing team)	46, Pittsburgh vs. Toledo	2024
Most points scored (both teams)	94, Toledo vs. Pittsburgh	2024
Fewest points allowed	7, Northwestern vs. Central Michigan	2025
Largest margin of victory	28, Western Michigan vs. Nevada	2021
Total yards	524, Rutgers vs. North Carolina	2014
Rushing yards	352, Western Michigan vs. Nevada	2021
Passing yards	361, Pittsburgh vs. Eastern Michigan	2019
First downs	30, Pittsburgh vs. Toledo	2024
Fewest yards allowed	242, Nevada vs. Western Michigan	2021
Fewest rushing yards allowed	65, Duke vs. Northern Illinois	2017
Fewest passing yards allowed	26, Bowling Green vs. Minnesota	2023
Individual	Record, Player (Team)	Year
All-purpose yards	281, Sean Tyler (Western Michigan)	2021
Touchdowns (all-purpose)	2, most recently: Griffin Wilde (Northwestern)	2025
Rushing yards	224, Mohamed Ibrahim (Minnesota)	2018
Rushing touchdowns	2, most recently: Jaxson Kincaide (Western Michigan)	2021
Passing yards	361, Kenny Pickett (Pittsburgh)	2019
Passing touchdowns	3, shared by: Kenny Pickett (Pittsburgh); Preston Stone (Northwestern)	2019; 2025
Receptions	12, shared by: Maurice Ffrench (Pittsburgh); Junior Vandeross III (Toledo)	2019; 2024
Receiving yards	194, Junior Vandeross III (Toledo)	2024
Receiving touchdowns	2, shared by: Tyler Johnson (Minnesota); Griffin Wilde (Northwestern)	2018; 2025
Tackles	14, Lorenzo Waters (Rutgers)	2014
Sacks	3, Aidan Hubbard (Northwestern)	2025
Interceptions	1, by several players	
Long Plays	Record, Player (Team)	Year
Touchdown run	62 yds., Ty Johnson (Maryland)	2016
Touchdown pass	96 yds., Kenny Pickett to Maurice Ffrench (Pittsburgh)	2019
Kickoff return	100 yds., Sean Tyler (Western Michigan)	2021
Punt return	27 yds., Le'Meke Brockington (Minnesota)	2023
Interception return	58 yds., Darius Alexander (Toledo)	2024
Fumble return	7 yds., Truman Gutapfel (Boston College)	2016
Punt	59 yds., Julian Diaz (Nevada)	2021
Field goal	57 yds., Ben Sauls (Pittsburgh)	2024

== Media coverage ==
The bowl has been televised by ESPN or ESPN2 since its inception.

== See also ==
- Sports in Detroit
