= 2022 New Mexico State Aggies football team =

American college football season

2022 New Mexico State Aggies football

Quick Lane Bowl champion

Quick Lane Bowl, W 24–19 vs. Bowling Green
- Conference: Independent
- Record: 7–6
- Head coach: Jerry Kill (1st season)
- Offensive coordinator: Tim Beck (1st season)
- Offensive scheme: Pistol
- Co-defensive coordinators: Nate Dreiling (1st season); Melvin Rice (1st season)
- Base defense: 3–3–5
- Home stadium: Aggie Memorial Stadium

2022 NCAA Division I FBS independents football records
	Conf.			Overall
Team	W		L	W		L
No. 18 Notre Dame		–		9	–	4
Liberty		–		8	–	5
BYU		–		8	–	5
New Mexico State		–		7	–	6
Army		–		6	–	6
UConn		–		6	–	7
UMass		–		1	–	11
Rankings from AP Poll

The 2022 New Mexico State Aggies football team represented New Mexico State University in the 2022 NCAA Division I FBS football season. The Aggies played their home games at Aggie Memorial Stadium in Las Cruces, New Mexico, and compete as an FBS independent. They were led by first-year head coach Jerry Kill.

The season was the program's last season as an independent as the Aggies joined Conference USA in 2023. Prior to the 2022 season 247Sports predicted them to have a 3–9 record and be one of the ten worst programs in the NCAA Division I Football Bowl Subdivision.

Despite having a 6–6 regular-season record with two wins over FCS teams, the NCAA granted a waiver for New Mexico State to be bowl-eligible due to their canceled game against San Jose State.

== Schedule ==
New Mexico State's schedule consists of six home games and six away games for the 2022 season.

Date	Time	Opponent	Site	TV	Result	Attendance
August 27	8:00 p.m.	Nevada	Aggie Memorial Stadium; Las Cruces, NM	ESPN2	L 12–23	23,371
September 1	7:00 p.m.	at Minnesota	Huntington Bank Stadium; Minneapolis, MN	BTN	L 0–38	44,012
September 10	7:00 p.m.	at UTEP	Sun Bowl; El Paso, TX (Battle of I-10)	ESPN+	L 13–20	23,325
September 17	1:30 p.m.	at Wisconsin	Camp Randall Stadium; Madison, WI	BTN	L 7–66	73,080
September 24	6:00 p.m.	Hawaii	Aggie Memorial Stadium; Las Cruces, NM	FloSports	W 45–26	12,897
October 1	6:00 p.m.	FIU	Aggie Memorial Stadium; Las Cruces, NM	FloSports	L 7–21	10,423
October 15	6:00 p.m.	New Mexico	Aggie Memorial Stadium; Las Cruces, NM (Rio Grande Rivalry)	FloSports	W 21–9	20,132
October 22	4:00 p.m.	San Jose State^{†}	Aggie Memorial Stadium; Las Cruces, NM	FloSports	Canceled	
October 29	1:30 p.m.	at UMass	Warren McGuirk Alumni Stadium; Hadley, MA	ESPN3	W 23–13	9,274
November 12	2:00 p.m.	Lamar	Aggie Memorial Stadium; Las Cruces, NM	FloSports	W 51–14	8,367
November 19	5:00 p.m.	at Missouri	Faurot Field; Columbia, MO	ESPNU	L 14–45	45,231
November 26	10:00 a.m.	at Liberty	Williams Stadium; Lynchburg, VA	ESPN+	W 49–14	18,837
December 3	1:00 p.m.	Valparaiso	Aggie Memorial Stadium; Las Cruces, NM	FloSports	W 65–3	14,784
December 26	12:30 p.m.	vs. Bowling Green	Ford Field; Detroit, MI (Quick Lane Bowl)	ESPN	W 24–19	22,987
^{†}Homecoming; Rankings from AP Poll (and CFP Rankings, after November 1) - Released prior to game; All times are in Mountain time

== Game summaries ==
=== Nevada ===
Nevada Wolf Pack at New Mexico State Aggies – Game summary

Quarter	1	2	3	4	Total
Wolf Pack	0	17	0	6	23
Aggies	0	2	7	3	12

at Aggie Memorial Stadium, Las Cruces, New Mexico

- Date: August 27
- Game time: 8:00 p.m. MDT
- Game weather: Cloudy • Temperature: 77 °F (25 °C) • Wind: NE 6 MPH
- Game attendance: 23,371
- Referee: Steve Baron
- TV announcers (ESPN2): Roy Philpott, Andre Ware, and Paul Carcaterra
- Box score, Recap

Game information
First quarter
- No scoring plays

Second quarter

- NMSU – Shane Illingworth tackled in end zone, 13:38. Aggies 2–0.
- NEV – Devonte Lee 32-yard run (Brandon Talton kick), 10:02. Wolf Pack 7–2. Drive: 4 plays, 80 yards, 1:28.
- NEV – Brandon Talton 28-yard field goal, 4:08. Wolf Pack 10–2. Drive: 5 plays, 18 yards, 2:26.
- NEV – Devonte Lee 4-yard run (Brandon Talton kick), 0:42. Wolf Pack 17–2. Drive: 5 plays, 18 yards, 2:26.

Third quarter

- NMSU – Kordell David 10-yard pass from Gavin Frakes (Ethan Albertson kick), 5:19. Wolf Pack 17–9. Drive: 5 plays, 85 yards, 2:50.

Fourth quarter

- NEV – Brandon Talton 34-yard field goal, 14:56. Wold Pack 20–9. Drive: 13 plays, 57 yards, 5:23.
- NMSU – Ethan Albertson 46-yard field goal, 8:12. Wolf Pack 20–12. Drive: 11 plays, 47 yards, 6:35.
- NEV – Brandon Talton 38-yard field goal, 1:35. Wolf Pack 23–12. Drive: 15 plays, 60 yards, 6:46.

Statistics

Statistics	NEV	NMSU
First downs	18	16
Total yards	257	303
Rushing yards	179	85
Passing yards	78	218
Turnovers	0	5
Time of possession	31:44	28:16

Team	Category	Player	Statistics
Nevada	Passing	Shane Illingworth	7/12, 51 yards
Nevada	Rushing	Toa Taua	19 rushes, 109 yards
Nevada	Receiving	Tyrese Mack	4 receptions, 40 yards
New Mexico State	Passing	Gavin Frakes	9/13, 143 yards, TD, INT
New Mexico State	Rushing	Diego Pavia	5 rushes, 36 yards
New Mexico State	Receiving	Justice Powers	2 receptions, 74 yards

=== At Minnesota ===
New Mexico State Aggies at Minnesota Golden Gophers – Game summary

Quarter	1	2	3	4	Total
Aggies	0	0	0	0	0
Golden Gophers	7	17	14	0	38

at Huntington Bank Stadium, Minneapolis, Minnesota

- Date: September 1
- Game time: 7:00 p.m. MDT/8:00 p.m. CDT
- Game weather: Clear • Temperature: 83 °F (28 °C) • Wind: N 7 MPH
- Game attendance: 44,012
- Referee: Mark Kluczynski
- TV announcers (BTN): Mark Followill, Matt Millen, and Elise Menaker
- Box score

Game information
First quarter
- MINN – Mohamed Ibrahim 4-yard run (Matthew Trickett kick), 9:50. Golden Gophers 7–0. Drive: 7 plays, 74 yards, 3:05.

Second quarter

- MINN – Mohamed Ibrahim 1-yard run (Matthew Trickett kick), 14:47. Golden Gophers 14–0. Drive: 13 plays, 64 yards, 12:58.
- MINN – Matthew Trickett 26-yard field goal, 8:26. Golden Gophers 17–0. Drive: 11 plays, 66 yards, 5:22.
- MINN – Tanner Morgan 1-yard run (Matthew Trickett kick), 0:19. Golden Gophers 24–0. Drive: 12 plays, 70 yards, 5:25.

Third quarter

- MINN – Tanner Morgan 1-yard run (Matthew Trickett kick), 6:31. Golden Gophers 31–0. Drive: 13 plays, 77 yards, 8:23.
- MINN – Trey Potts 1-yard run (Matthew Trickett kick), 0:09. Golden Gophers 38–0. Drive: 9 plays, 59 yards, 5:00.

Fourth quarter

- No scoring plays

Statistics

Statistics	NMSU	MINN
First downs	6	31
Total yards	91	485
Rushing yards	38	297
Passing yards	53	188
Turnovers	1	0
Time of possession	15:30	44:30

Team	Category	Player	Statistics
New Mexico State	Passing	Gavin Frakes	2/7, 43 yards, INT
New Mexico State	Rushing	Diego Pavia	3 rushes, 14 yards
New Mexico State	Receiving	Justice Powers	1 receptions, 34 yards
Minnesota	Passing	Tanner Morgan	13/19, 174 yards
Minnesota	Rushing	Mohamed Ibrahim	21 rushes, 132 yards, 2 TD
Minnesota	Receiving	Mike Brown-Stephens	3 receptions, 52 yards

=== At UTEP ===
New Mexico State Aggies at UTEP Miners – Game summary

Quarter	1	2	3	4	Total
Aggies	0	0	6	7	13
Miners	3	14	3	0	20

at Sun Bowl, El Paso, Texas

- Date: September 10
- Game time: 7:00 p.m. MDT
- Game weather: Sunny • Temperature: 88 °F (31 °C) • Wind: NW 2 MPH
- Game attendance: 23,325
- Referee: Michael Vandervelde
- TV announcers (ESPN+): Erik Elken and Jacob Boggs
- Box score, Recap

Statistics

Statistics	NMSU	UTEP
First downs		
Total yards		
Rushing yards		
Passing yards		
Turnovers		
Time of possession		

Team	Category	Player	Statistics
New Mexico State	Passing		
New Mexico State	Rushing		
New Mexico State	Receiving		
UTEP	Passing		
UTEP	Rushing		
UTEP	Receiving		

=== At Wisconsin ===
New Mexico State Aggies at Wisconsin Badgers – Game summary

Quarter	1	2	3	4	Total
Aggies	0	0	0	7	7
Badgers	7	28	21	10	66

at Camp Randall Stadium, Madison, Wisconsin

- Date: September 17
- Game time: 1:30 p.m. MDT/2:30 p.m. CDT
- Game weather: Cloudy • Temperature: 79 °F (26 °C) • Wind: S 14 MPH
- Game attendance: 73,080
- Referee: Kole Knueppel
- TV announcers (BTN): Brandon Gaudin (play-by-play), Joshua Perry (analyst), Rick Pizzo (sideline)
- Box score, Recap

Game information

First quarter

- WIS – Braelon Allen 39-yard run (Nate Van Zelst kick), 13:30 Wisconsin 7–0 Drive: 3 plays, 49 yards, 1:22.

Second quarter

- WIS – Chez Mellusi 2-yard run (Nate Van Zelst kick), 14:56 Wisconsin 14–0 Drive: 7 plays, 63 yards, 2:40.
- WIS – Keontez Lewis 18-yard pass from Graham Mertz (Nate Van Zelst kick), 12:22. Wisconsin 21–0. Drive: 4 plays, 56 yards, 1:37.
- WIS – Braelon Allen 1-yard run (Nate Van Zelst kick), 11:17 Wisconsin 28–0 Drive: 2 plays, 2 yards, 0:41.
- WIS – Braelon Allen 2-yard run (Nate Van Zelst kick), 6:09 Wisconsin 35–0 Drive: 5 plays, 63 yards, 2:33.

Third quarter

- WIS – Skyler Bell 49-yard pass from Graham Mertz (Nate Van Zelst kick), 10:21. Wisconsin 42–0. Drive: 5 plays, 82 yards, 2:10.
- WIS – Skyler Bell 18-yard pass from Graham Mertz (Nate Van Zelst kick), 6:53. Wisconsin 49–0. Drive: 4 plays, 48 yards, 1:50.
- WIS – Isaac Guerendo 3-yard run (Nate Van Zelst kick), 1:41 Wisconsin 56–0 Drive: 8 plays, 70 yards, 3:56.

Fourth quarter

- WIS – Isaac Guerendo 30-yard run (Nate Van Zelst kick), 11:48 Wisconsin 63–0 Drive: 3 plays, 37 yards, 1:28.
- NMS – Ahmonte Watkins 1-yard run (Nate Van Zelst kick), 8:10 Wisconsin 63–7 Drive: 7 plays, 75 yards, 3:38.
- WIS – Nate Van Zelst 27-yard field goal, 3:58. Wisconsin 66–7. Drive: 8 plays, 66 yards, 4:12.

Statistics

Statistics	NMSU	WISC
First downs	14	24
Total yards	242	595
Rushing yards	118	260
Passing yards	124	335
Turnovers	3	1
Time of possession	28:43	31:17

Team	Category	Player	Statistics
New Mexico State	Passing	Diego Pavia	6/19, 52 yards, INT
New Mexico State	Rushing	Star Thomas	9 rushes, 46 yards
New Mexico State	Receiving	Jordin Parker	1 reception, 36 yards
Wisconsin	Passing	Graham Mertz	12/15, 251 yards, 3 TD, INT
Wisconsin	Rushing	Braelon Allen	15 rushes, 86 yards, 3 TD
Wisconsin	Receiving	Skyler Bell	4 receptions, 108 yards, 2 TD

=== Hawaii ===
Hawaii Rainbow Warriors at New Mexico State Aggies – Game summary

Quarter	1	2	3	4	Total
Rainbow Warriors	7	3	7	9	26
Aggies	14	21	7	3	45

at Aggie Memorial Stadium, Las Cruces, New Mexico

- Date: September 24
- Game time: 6:00 p.m. MDT
- Game weather: Sunny • Temperature: 89 °F (32 °C) • Wind: SE 3 MPH
- Game attendance: 12,897
- Referee: Steve Baron
- TV announcers (FloSports): Adam Young, Danny Knee, and Andy Morgan
- Box score, Recap

Statistics

Statistics	HAW	NMSU
First downs		
Total yards		
Rushing yards		
Passing yards		
Turnovers		
Time of possession		

Team	Category	Player	Statistics
Hawaii	Passing		
Hawaii	Rushing		
Hawaii	Receiving		
New Mexico State	Passing		
New Mexico State	Rushing		
New Mexico State	Receiving		

=== FIU ===
FIU Panthers at New Mexico State Aggies – Game summary

Quarter	1	2	3	4	Total
Panthers	7	14	0	0	21
Aggies	0	7	0	0	7

at Aggie Memorial Stadium, Las Cruces, New Mexico

- Date: October 1
- Game time: 6:00 p.m. MDT
- Game weather: Sunny • Temperature: 84 °F (29 °C) • Wind: NW 9 MPH
- Game attendance: 10,423
- Referee: Kevin Boitmann
- TV announcers (FloSports): Adam Young, Danny Knee, and Andy Morgan
- Box score, Recap

Statistics

Statistics	FIU	NMSU
First downs	20	14
Total yards	344	221
Rushing yards	162	82
Passing yards	182	139
Turnovers	0	0
Time of possession	30:45	29:15

Team	Category	Player	Statistics
FIU	Passing	Grayson James	13/19, 175 yards, 3 TD
FIU	Rushing	Lexington Joseph	14 rushes, 80 yards
FIU	Receiving	Tyrese Chambers	6 receptions, 72 yards, TD
New Mexico State	Passing	Diego Pavia	8/14, 85 yards
New Mexico State	Rushing	Jamoni Jones	12 rushes, 50 yards
New Mexico State	Receiving	Bryce Childress	5 receptions, 43 yards

=== New Mexico ===
New Mexico Lobos at New Mexico State Aggies – Game summary

Quarter	1	2	3	4	Total
Lobos	3	3	0	3	9
Aggies	7	0	14	0	21

at Aggie Memorial Stadium, Las Cruces, New Mexico

- Date: October 15
- Game time: 6:00 p.m. MDT
- Game weather: Sunny • Temperature: 80 °F (27 °C) • Wind: 2 MPH
- Game attendance: 20,132
- Referee: Mike Cuttone
- TV announcers (FloSports): Adam Young, Danny Knee, and Tatiana Favela
- Box score, Recap

Statistics

Statistics	UNM	NMSU
First downs		
Total yards		
Rushing yards		
Passing yards		
Turnovers		
Time of possession		

Team	Category	Player	Statistics
New Mexico	Passing		
New Mexico	Rushing		
New Mexico	Receiving		
New Mexico State	Passing		
New Mexico State	Rushing		
New Mexico State	Receiving		

=== San Jose State (cancelled) ===
The day before the game, October 21, San Jose State freshman running back Camdan McWright was struck by a school bus, sustaining fatal injuries. The game between the Spartans and Aggies was postponed to allow San Jose State players time to grieve before the game was outright canceled. New Mexico State later scheduled a game against Valparaiso as a replacement.

=== At UMass ===
New Mexico State Aggies at UMass Minutemen – Game summary

Quarter	1	2	3	4	Total
Aggies	0	10	6	7	23
Minutemen	3	10	0	0	13

at Warren McGuirk Alumni Stadium, Hadley, Massachusetts

- Date: October 29
- Game time: 1:30 p.m. MDT/3:30 p.m. EDT
- Game weather: Sunny • Temperature: 59 °F (15 °C) • Wind: S 2 MPH
- Game attendance: 9,274
- Referee: Stuart Mullins
- TV announcers (ESPN3): Jay Burnham, Andy Gresh, and Matt Goldstein
- Box score, Recap

Statistics

Statistics	NMSU	MASS
First downs		
Total yards		
Rushing yards		
Passing yards		
Turnovers		
Time of possession		

Team	Category	Player	Statistics
New Mexico State	Passing		
New Mexico State	Rushing		
New Mexico State	Receiving		
UMass	Passing		
UMass	Rushing		
UMass	Receiving		

=== Lamar ===
Lamar Cardinals at New Mexico State Aggies – Game summary

Quarter	1	2	3	4	Total
Cardinals	0	0	7	7	14
Aggies	17	20	14	0	51

at Aggie Memorial Stadium, Las Cruces, New Mexico

- Date: November 12
- Game time: 2:00 p.m. MST
- Game weather: Sunny • Temperature: 55 °F (13 °C) • Wind: NW 3 MPH
- Game attendance: 8,367
- Referee: Cal McNeil
- TV announcers (FloSports): Adam Young, Danny Knee, and Andy Morgan
- Box score, Recap

Statistics

Statistics	LAM	NMSU
First downs	14	22
Total yards	247	433
Rushing yards	125	187
Passing yards	122	246
Turnovers	3	0
Time of possession	25:22	29:37

Team	Category	Player	Statistics
Lamar	Passing	Nick Yockey	7/13, 89 yards, TD
Lamar	Rushing	Hunter Batten	3 carries, 44 yards, TD
Lamar	Receiving	Devyn Gibbs	3 receptions, 47 yards
New Mexico State	Passing	Diego Pavia	14/19, 154 yards, 2 TD
New Mexico State	Rushing	Diego Pavia	8 carries, 81 yards
New Mexico State	Receiving	Ta'ir Brooks	2 receptions, 70 yards

=== At Missouri ===
New Mexico State Aggies at Missouri Tigers – Game summary

Quarter	1	2	3	4	Total
Aggies	0	0	7	7	14
Tigers	7	14	14	10	45

at Faurot Field, Columbia, Missouri

- Date: November 19
- Game time: 5:00 p.m. MST/6:00 p.m. CST
- Game weather: Clear • Temperature: 26 °F (−3 °C) • Wind: SE 14 MPH
- Game attendance: 45,231
- Referee: Lee Hedrick
- TV announcers (ESPNU): Drew Carter and Forrest Conoly
- Box score, Recap

Game information

First quarter

- (6:14) MIZ – Luther Burden 12-yard pass from Brady Cook, Harrison Mevis kick (Drive: 11 plays, 64 yards, 5:18; Missouri 7–0)

Second quarter

- (12:02) MIZ – Cody Schrader 2-yard run, Harrison Mevis kick (Drive: 17 plays, 81 yards, 6:33; Missouri 14–0)
- (4:28) MIZ – Ryan Hoerstkamp 32-yard pass from Brady Cook, Harrison Mevis kick (Drive: 7 plays, 66 yards, 3:39; Missouri 21–0)

Third quarter

- (10:42) MIZ – Cody Schrader 5-yard run, Harrison Mevis kick (Drive: 9 plays, 69 yards, 4:13; Missouri 28–0)
- (4:29) NMSU – Star Thomas 10-yard run, Ethan Albertson kick (Drive: 10 plays, 75 yards, 6:13; Missouri 28–7)
- (0:55) MIZ – Luther Burden 12-yard pass from Brady Cook, Harrison Mevis kick (Drive: 7 plays, 70 yards, 3:29; Missouri 35–7)

Fourth quarter

- (12:41) MIZ – Daylan Carnell 40-yard interception, Harrison Mevis kick (Missouri 42–7)
- (9:54) MIZ – Harrison Mevis 43-yard field goal (Drive: 6 plays, 17 yards, 2:14; Missouri 45–7)
- (4:20) NMSU – Gavin Frakes 13-yard run, Ethan Albertson kick (Drive: 5 plays, 44 yards, 2:18; Missouri 45–14)

Statistics

Statistics	NMSU	MIZ
First downs	16	24
Total yards	259	443
Rushing yards	115	261
Passing yards	144	182
Turnovers	2	1
Time of possession	30:34	29:26

Team	Category	Player	Statistics
New Mexico State	Passing	Diego Pavia	6/17, 76 yards, INT
New Mexico State	Rushing	Diego Pavia	9 carries, 50 yards
New Mexico State	Receiving	J. J. Jones	2 receptions, 38 yards
Missouri	Passing	Brady Cook	19/27, 251 yards, 3 TD
Missouri	Rushing	Brady Cook	7 carries, 71 yards
Missouri	Receiving	Barrett Banister	7 receptions, 91 yards

=== At Liberty ===
New Mexico State Aggies at Liberty Flames – Game summary

Quarter	1	2	3	4	Total
Aggies	7	21	14	7	49
Flames	7	0	0	7	14

at Williams Stadium, Lynchburg, Virginia

- Date: November 26
- Game time: 10:00 a.m. MST/12:00 p.m. EST
- Game weather: Sunny • Temperature: 58 °F (14 °C) • Wind: SW 5 MPH
- Game attendance: 18,837
- Referee: Stuart Mullins
- TV announcers (ESPN+): Matt Warner, Joe Jauch, and Emily Austen
- Box score, Recap

Statistics

Statistics	NMSU	LIB
First downs		
Total yards		
Rushing yards		
Passing yards		
Turnovers		
Time of possession		

Team	Category	Player	Statistics
New Mexico State	Passing		
New Mexico State	Rushing		
New Mexico State	Receiving		
Liberty	Passing		
Liberty	Rushing		
Liberty	Receiving		

=== Valparaiso ===
Valparaiso Beacons at New Mexico State Aggies – Game summary

Quarter	1	2	3	4	Total
Beacons	0	3	0	0	3
Aggies	21	14	17	13	65

at Aggie Memorial Stadium, Las Cruces, New Mexico

- Date: December 3
- Game time: 1:00 p.m. MST
- Game weather: Cloudy • Temperature: 66 °F (19 °C) • Wind: N 7 MPH
- Game attendance: 14,784
- TV announcers (FloSports): Adam Young, Danny Knee, and Andy Morgan
- Box score, Recap

Game information
First quarter
- NMSU – Jonathan Brady 50-yard pass from Diego Pavia (Ethan Albertson kick), 9:25. Aggies 7–0. Drive: 3 plays, 84 yards, 1:22.
- NMSU – Justice Powers 69-yard pass from Diego Pavia (Ethan Albertson kick), 4:33. Aggies 14–0. Drive: 4 plays, 81 yards, 1:45.
- NMSU – Kordell David 70-yard pass from Diego Pavia (Ethan Albertson kick), 2:44. Aggies 21–0. Drive: 1 play, 70 yards, 0:11.

Second quarter

- VAL – Brian Bartholomew 49-yard field goal, 13:59. Aggies 21–3. Drive: 10 plays, 53 yards, 3:40.
- NMSU – Bryce Childress 72-yard pass from Diego Pavia (Ethan Albertson kick), 13:02. Aggies 28–3. Drive: 2 plays, 74 yards, 0:50.
- NMSU – Diego Pavia 13-yard run (Ethan Albertson kick), 6:23. Aggies 35–3. Drive: 7 plays, 75 yards, 3:11.

Third quarter

- NMSU – Jamoni Jones 2-yard run (Ethan Albertson kick), 10:52. Aggies 42–3. Drive: 1 play, 2 yards, 0:03.
- NMSU – Star Thomas 1-yard run (Ethan Albertson kick), 6:39. Aggies 49–3. Drive: 7 plays, 60 yards, 2:46.
- NMSU – Ethan Albertson 42-yard field goal, 5:03. Aggies 52–3. Drive: 4 plays, 7 yards, 0:34.

Fourth quarter

- NMSU – Ahmonte Watkins 78-yard run (Ethan Albertson kick), 14:33. Aggies 59–3. Drive: 1 play, 78 yards, 0:00.
- NMSU – Jonathan Brady 8-yard pass from Weston Eget (run failed), 10:18. Aggies 65–3. Drive: 4 plays, 44 yards, 1:58.

Statistics

Statistics	VAL	NMSU
First downs	15	20
Total yards	188	621
Rushing yards	28	232
Passing yards	160	389
Turnovers	0	1
Time of possession	40:09	19:51

Team	Category	Player	Statistics
Valparaiso	Passing	Michael Appel Jr.	16/31, 106 yards
Valparaiso	Rushing	Aaron Dawson	13 rushes, 17 yards
Valparaiso	Receiving	Braden Contreras	4 receptions, 40 yards
New Mexico State	Passing	Diego Pavia	9/13, 323 yards, 4 TD
New Mexico State	Rushing	Ahmonte Watkins	1 rush, 78 yards, TD
New Mexico State	Receiving	Kordell David	3 receptions, 95 yards, TD

On November 29, New Mexico State announced that a game against Valparaiso had been scheduled in order to make-up for the canceled game against San Jose State. The Beacons, an FCS team, had played 11 games already so the NCAA had to approve a waiver in order for the game to be played. New Mexico State reached out to other schools such as Nevada, Wyoming, and Virginia Tech. As the Aggies had already played an FCS team earlier in the season the program had to get a second waiver approved that would allow the team to become bowl eligible with two wins against FCS opponents. Two days before the game, December 1, the NCAA approved the waiver due to the canceled game against San Jose State.

With the win over the Beacons, and with NCAA approval, the Aggies became bowl eligible for the first time since the 2017 season.

=== Vs. Bowling Green (Quick Lane Bowl) ===
New Mexico State Aggies vs. Bowling Green Falcons (2022 Quick Lane Bowl) – Game summary

Quarter	1	2	3	4	Total
Aggies	7	7	10	0	24
Falcons	0	0	7	12	19

at Ford Field, Detroit, Michigan

- Date: December 26
- Game time: 12:30 p.m. MST/2:30 p.m. EST
- Game weather: None (played indoors)
- Game attendance: 22,987
- Referee: Jeff Servinski
- TV announcers (ESPN): John Schriffen, Rene Ingoglia, and Tera Talmadge
- Box score, Recap

Game information
First quarter
- NMSU – Star Thomas 15-yard pass from Diego Pavia (Ethan Albertson kick), 9:39. Aggies 7–0. Drive: 8 plays, 70 yards, 4:05.

Second quarter

- NMSU – Eric Marsh 2-yard pass from Diego Pavia (Ethan Albertson kick), 7:36. Aggies 14–0. Drive: 10 plays, 80 yards, 4:11.

Third quarter

- NMSU – Ethan Albertson 35-yard field goal, 11:15. Aggies 17–0. Drive: 7 plays, 57 yards, 3:45.
- BGSU – Ta'Ron Keith 75-yard kickoff return (Mason Lawler kick), 11:02. Aggies 17–7.
- NMSU – Ahmonte Watkins 45-yard run (Ethan Albertson kick), 3:26. Aggies 24–7. Drive: 2 plays, 53 yards, 0:45.

Fourth quarter

- BGSU – Mason Lawler 49-yard field goal, 14:55. Aggies 24–10. Drive: 9 plays, 34 yards, 3:31.
- BGSU – Davion Daniels blocked punt out of the end zone, 7:10. Aggies 24–12.
- BGSU – Tyrone Broden 19-yard pass from Camden Orth (Mason Lawler kick), 6:27. Aggies 24–19. Drive: 2 plays, 48 yards, 0:43.

Statistics

Statistics	NMSU	BGSU
First downs	21	16
Total yards	407	294
Rushing yards	240	84
Passing yards	167	221
Turnovers	1	2
Time of possession	38:10	21:50

Team	Category	Player	Statistics
New Mexico State	Passing	Diego Pavia	17/29, 167 yards, 2 TD, INT
New Mexico State	Rushing	Ahmonte Watkins	9 rushes, 76 yards, TD
New Mexico State	Receiving	Kordell David	5 receptions, 54 yards
Bowling Green	Passing	Camden Orth	14/22, 191 yards, TD
Bowling Green	Rushing	Jaison Patterson	6 rushes, 23 yards
Bowling Green	Receiving	Ta'ron Keith	3 receptions, 69 yards
