= 2022 Quick Lane Bowl =

Postseason college football bowl game

- 8th Quick Lane Bowl
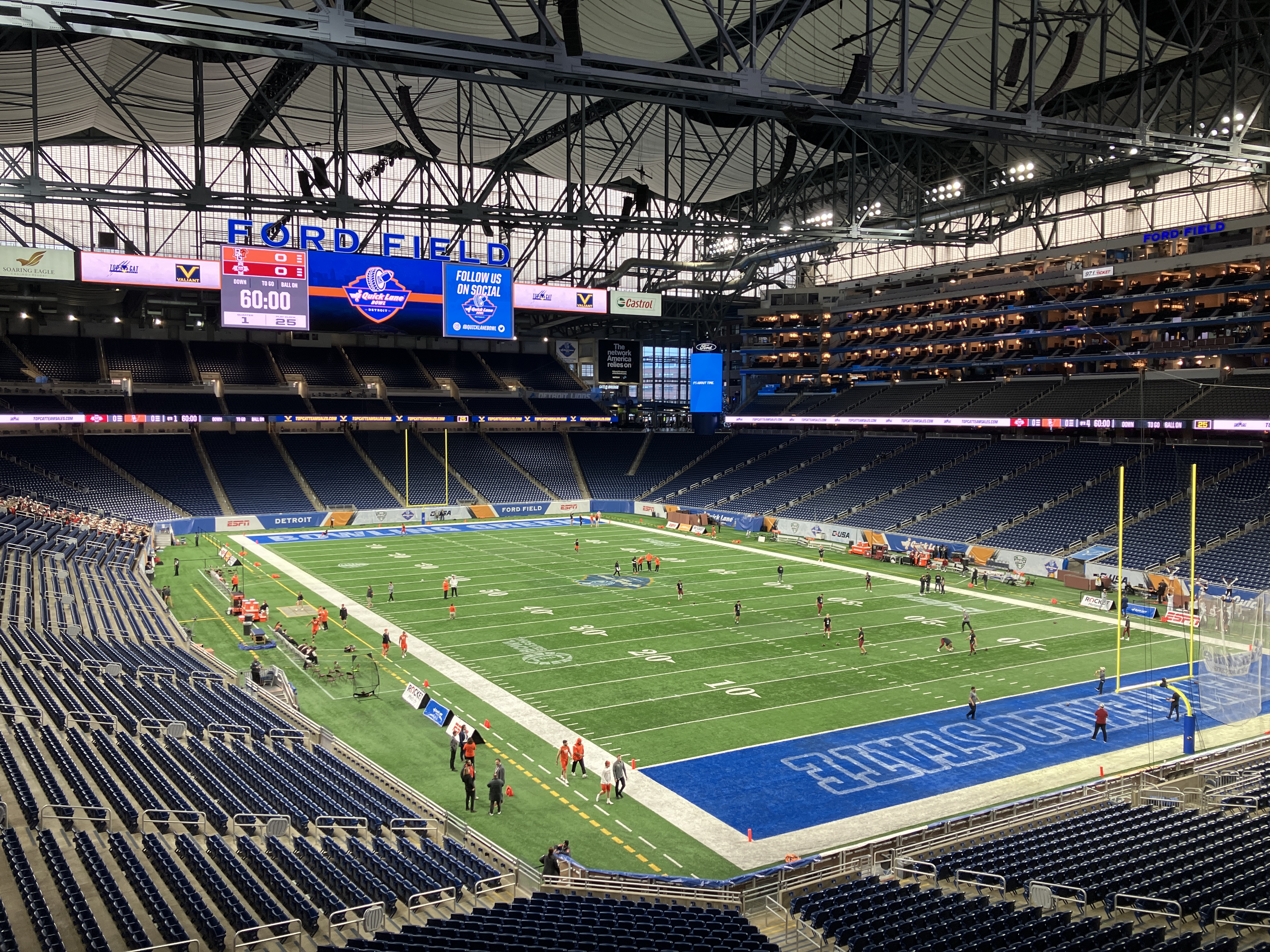
| New Mexico State Aggies | Bowling Green Falcons |
| (6–6) | (6–6) |
| Independent | MAC |
| 24 | 19 |
| Head coach: Jerry Kill | Head coach: Scot Loeffler |
| | 1 | 2 | 3 | 4 | Total |
|---|---|---|---|---|---|
| New Mexico State | 7 | 7 | 10 | 0 | 24 |
| Bowling Green | 0 | 0 | 7 | 12 | 19 |
- Date: December 26, 2022
- Season: 2022
- Stadium: Ford Field
- Location: Detroit, Michigan
- MVP: Diego Pavia (QB, New Mexico State)
- Favorite: Bowling Green by 3.5
- Referee: Jeff Servinski (Big Ten)
- Attendance: 22,987
- Payout: US$2,000,000

United States TV coverage
- Network: ESPN
- Announcers: John Schriffen (play-by-play), Rene Ingoglia (analyst), and Tera Talmadge (sideline)

International TV coverage
- Network: ESPN Deportes

The 2022 Quick Lane Bowl was a college football bowl game played on December 26, 2022, at Ford Field in Detroit, Michigan, United States. The eighth annual Quick Lane Bowl, the bowl featured New Mexico State, an FBS Independent, and Bowling Green of the Mid-American Conference (MAC). The game began at 2:34 p.m. EST and aired on ESPN. It was one of the 2022–23 bowl games concluding the 2022 FBS football season. The game's title sponsor was automotive chain Quick Lane Tire and Auto Center.

Despite being the designated home team, Bowling Green was asked to call the coin toss and lost the flip. New Mexico State deferred and started the game as the better team as their defense made the first big play, an interception of quarterback Matt McDonald by Trevor Brohard on Bowling Green's first drive. New Mexico State scored the game's first points in response, with a 15-yard pass thrown by Diego Pavia caught by Star Thomas for a touchdown. Bowling Green missed a field goal on their second drive and punted on their third, while New Mexico State's third drive resulted in another touchdown that stretched their lead to 14 points. Another missed field goal for the Falcons and an interception thrown by Pavia ended the half, and the Aggies made a field goal to increase their lead on their first drive of the second half. Bowling Green's first score came on the ensuing kickoff, which was returned for a touchdown by Ta'ron Keith. The teams then traded punts and then scores, as New Mexico State scored a touchdown and Bowling Green made their first field goal. Bowling Green inched closer with a safety resulting from a punt block several drives later and a touchdown on their next possession, which brought them within five points, but the Aggies were able to pick up enough first downs and run out the clock on their final possession to win the game 24–19.

== Teams ==
Based on conference tie-ins, the game typically features teams from the Big Ten Conference and the Mid-American Conference (MAC). However, with the Big Ten securing two spots in the College Football Playoff, there were not enough additional bowl eligible teams in the conference to fulfill the obligation for this game, allowing for a replacement team. The game pitted the New Mexico State Aggies and the Bowling Green Falcons; this was their first meeting.

=== New Mexico State Aggies ===
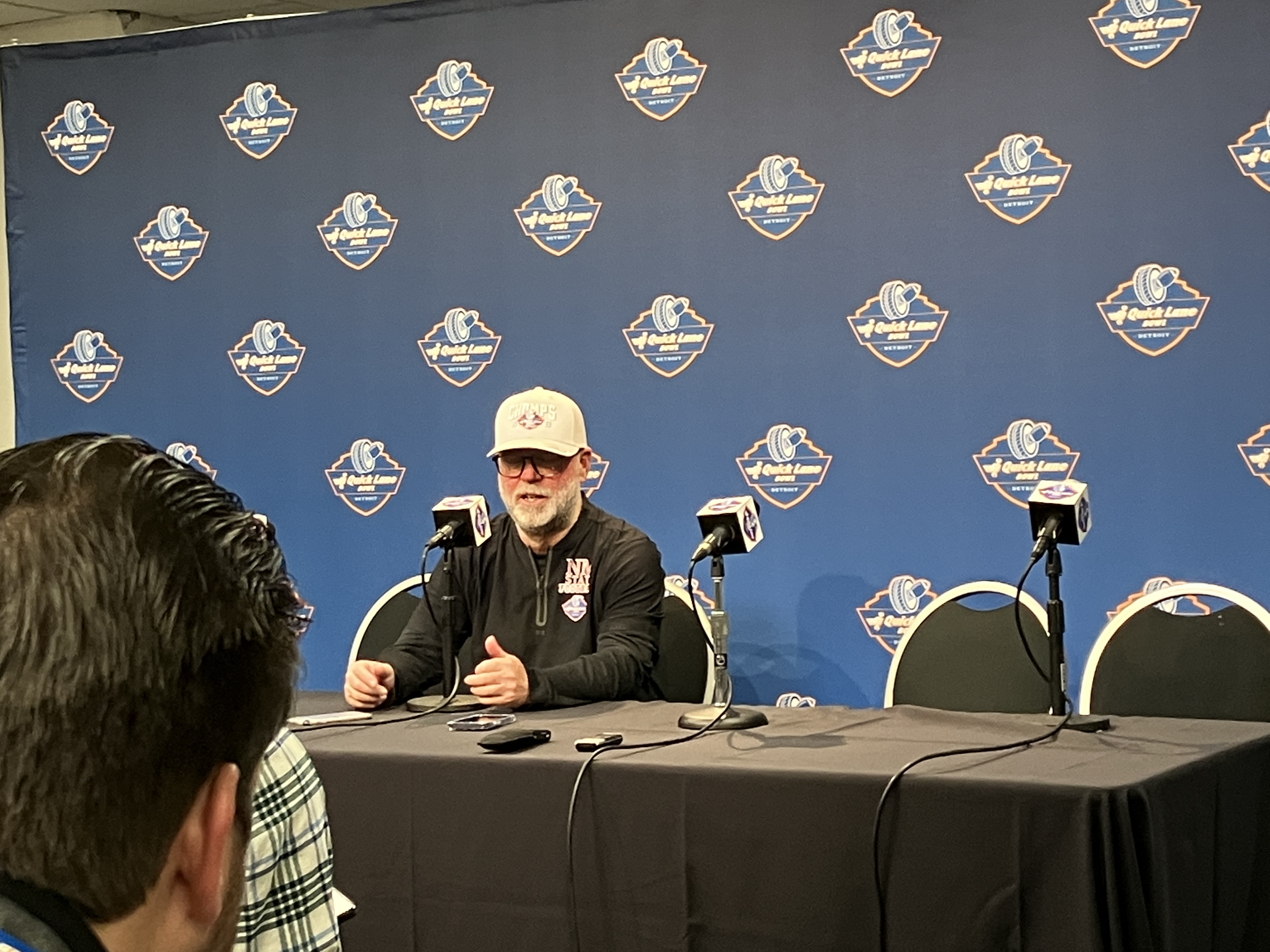
New Mexico State head coach Jerry Kill speaking with reporters at a press conference

The Aggies, an FBS independent, finished the regular season with a record of 6–6. Under normal circumstances, a 6–6 team with two wins over Football Championship Subdivision (FCS) teams would be bowl-ineligible, however, the Aggies' circumstances were anything but normal. The Aggies' scheduled game against San Jose State was cancelled in the wake of the death of Spartans freshman running back Camdan McWright. With a 5–6 record heading into the last week of the season, the Aggies applied for a waiver with the NCAA to allow them to play in a bowl game, which was granted.

This was the fifth overall bowl game in New Mexico State history; they had compiled a 3–0–1 record in prior bowls, most recently appearing in and winning the 2017 Arizona Bowl. The Aggies entered the game as the only active FBS team to have appeared in one or more bowl games in their program's history without sustaining a loss.

This was New Mexico State's first appearance in a game played outside the Southwestern United States. It was also their final game as an FBS independent, as the Aggies will compete as a member of Conference USA beginning in 2023.

=== Bowling Green Falcons ===
Bowling Green finished their regular season with a 6–6 record, 5–3 in conference play. They began with three losses in their first four games, but became bowl eligible after winning four of five games from mid-October to mid-November. One of their losses, to FCS team Eastern Kentucky on September 10, took seven overtimes to decide. The Falcons did not face any ranked teams during the season.

This was Bowling Green's 14th all-time bowl game appearance and their first Quick Lane Bowl appearance. Their last appearance in a bowl game was in the December 2015 GoDaddy Bowl, when they lost to Georgia Southern.

== Game summary ==
The game was televised on ESPN, with a commentary team of John Schriffen, Rene Ingoglia, and Tera Talmadge. The game's officiating crew, representing the Pac-12 Conference, was to be led by referee Michael Mothershed, though he encountered travel issues and was not able to make the game; Big Ten Conference referee Jeff Servinski was named as a replacement. The game was played indoors at Ford Field in Detroit, Michigan.

=== First half ===
Scheduled for a 1:30 p.m. CST start, the 2022 Quick Lane Bowl began at 1:34 p.m. with Ethan Albertson's opening kickoff which was returned by Jhaylin Embry to the Bowling Green 25-yard-line. The Falcons offense started quickly with a gain of 17 yards on their first play as the result of a pass from Matt McDonald to Odieu Hiliare followed by a 9-yard rush by Ta'ron Keith. On third down, McDonald's third pass of the game was intercepted by Trevor Brohard at the New Mexico State 30-yard-line, giving the Aggies defense an early takeaway. New Mexico State's offense did not start out quite as well, as a false start penalty set them back to 3rd & 13 early on. They converted this with a 42-yard pass from Diego Pavia to Justice Powers, and Pavia rushed for 10 yards several plays later to reach the red zone and earn a first down. Two plays later, Star Thomas was on the receiving end of a 15-yard Pavia pass for the game's first touchdown, giving the Aggies a 7–0 lead. Bowling Green gained a first down on their first play for the second time, with McDonald connecting with Christian Sims for a 13-yard gain. On their next series, they faced 3rd & 9 but converted with an 11-yard rush from McDonald, though he was injured on the play. Backup quarterback Camden Orth entered to replace him, and completed his first pass for 10 yards to Austin Osborne for a first down. The Falcons stalled from there and settled for a 48-yard field goal attempt, which was missed by placekicker Mason Lawler. After a 17-yard pass from Pavia to Kordell David on the second play of their next drive, New Mexico State stalled as well and punted on 4th & 12, with the kick downed at the Bowling Green 15-yard-line. Bowling Green got the ball back with 51 seconds on the clock and were able to run two plays and gain 11 yards before the first quarter expired.

Jaison Patterson began the second quarter with a 4-yard rush for the Falcons, and Orth passed to Christian Sims for a 16-yard gain two plays later, moving the ball to the Bowling Green 47-yard-line. After a pari of rushes by Jamal Johnson for a total of 9 yards, they faced 4th & 1 that was soon moved to a 4th & 6 due to a false start penalty. They punted and the kick was fair caught at the New Mexico State 20-yard-line. The Aggies gained a first down on their first play and again on their third play; the latter was a 29-yard pass to Jonathan Brady that put them in Bowling Green territory. An unnecessary roughness penalty called against Chris Bacon on the next play but New Mexico State inside the red zone, and they scored several plays later with a 2-yard pass from Pavia to Eric Marsh. Bowling Green's offense was also sparked by a big play early on in their next drive: a 28-yard pass from Orth to Keith that moved the ball to the New Mexico State 29-yard-line. They were unable to keep that momentum going, though, and faced 4th & 4 from the 23-yard-line and attempted a 41-yard field goal, though it was no good and New Mexico State took over at that spot. The Aggies began with a 13-yard rush by Star Thomas that was followed up three plays later by a 17-yard pass from Pavia to David. The Aggies soon thereafter found themselves facing 4th & 6, and on that play Pavia's pass was intercepted by Bacon and returned to the Bowling Green 32-yard-line, giving the Falcons one final possession with 22 seconds remaining in the half. Bowling Green gained 17 yards in their first three plays and attempted a Hail Mary pass with one second left from their own 40-yard-line, though it was batted down and the game went to halftime.

=== Second half ===
New Mexico State got the ball to begin the third quarter, as Lawrence Dixon returned Lawler's kickoff to the Aggies' 25-yard-line. Pavia completed a pass to brady on the quarter's first play from scrimmage, which gained 8 yards, and Jamoni Jones rushed for 5 yards on the next play to gain the Aggies a first down. Immediately after, Brady broke off a 37-yard rush that reached the Bowling Green 25-yard-line, and despite a lack of progress afterwards from the offense, Ethan Albertson was able to make a 35-yard field goal to stretch New Mexico State's lead to 17 points. This would not stand for long: on the ensuing kickoff, Keith fielded the short kick at his own 25-yard-line and returned it for a touchdown, giving Bowling Green their first points of the contest. New Mexico State's next drive began at their own 19-yard-line and saw two third down conversions from 5 and 8 yards, respectively, before a pass on 3rd & 2 late in the drive was incomplete and prompted a punt by the Aggies. George Eberle's kick was downed at the Bowling Green 5-yard-line, and the Falcons were not able to make much of it, as they went three-and-out and punted back to New Mexico State at the Aggies' 47-yard-line. The Aggies were quick to capitalize and gained 8 yards on their first play before scoring a 45-yard touchdown on their second, both on rushes from Ahmonte Watkins. On the Falcons' ensuing drive, Orth completed back-to-back passes early on, to Hiliare for 14 yards and then to Keith for 17. A holding penalty called against Bronson Warner then set them back, but a 21-yard pass from Orth to Sims picked up all of the required yardage and gained them a first down. After another penalty later in the drive, this one an unsportsmanlike conduct foul on Warner, put them at 3rd & 22 and the Falcons gained four yards on the final play of the quarter.

Mason Lawler made a 49-yard field goal for the Falcons on the first play of the fourth quarter, narrowing their deficit to 14 points with five seconds off the clock. His ensuing kickoff was returned to the New Mexico State 42-yard-line; after gaining three yards on their first two plays, the Aggies suffered back-to-back penalties that set them back fifteen yards in total. The drive ended in a punt, which rolled out-of-bounds at the New Mexico State 41-yard-line for a total distance of only 14 yards. Bowling Green's next drive was cut short after only three plays; it started with a 24-yard completion from Orth to Keith, but they gave up the ball with a fumble following a 13-yard pass from Orth to Hiliare. New Mexico State recovered on their own 3-yard-line, and began their drive with a short rush and an incomplete pass before Pavia scrambled for 9 yards and a first down. Two short rushes and a tackle for loss followed and New Mexico State opted to punt, though the punt was blocked and went out of the back of the end zone, resulting in a safety for the Bowling Green defense, which gave them two points and possession of the ball. They took advantage of this possession quickly, with Orth completing a 14-yard pass and a 19-yard pass, both to Broden and the latter for a touchdown. Lawler's extra point made the deficit five points. The Aggies began their next drive at their own 25-yard-line, but faced 3rd & 9 shortly thereafter; Pavia converted with a 9-yard rush. A false start penalty set them back five yards on their next set of downs, but Pavia again picked up a first down on the ground with a 10-yard rush, after which the Aggies rushed twice and passed once, picking up a first down and exhausting Bowling Green's three timeouts. Their final first down, a 5-yard Pavia rush, allowed them to take a knee and run out the remaining time to secure a 24–19 bowl victory.

=== Scoring summary ===
2022 Quick Lane Bowl

| Quarter | 1 | 2 | 3 | 4 | Total |
|---|---|---|---|---|---|
| New Mexico State | 7 | 7 | 10 | 0 | 24 |
| Bowling Green | 0 | 0 | 7 | 12 | 19 |

at Ford Field • Detroit, Michigan

- Date: Monday, December 26, 2022
- Game time: 2:30 p.m. EST
- Game weather: n/a (game played indoors)
- Game attendance: 22,987
- Referee: Jeff Servinski
- TV announcers (ESPN): John Schriffen (play-by-play) Rene Ingoglia (analyst), and Tera Talmadge (sideline)
- Box score

Scoring summary

| Quarter | Time | Drive | | | Team | Scoring information | Score | |
| Quarter | Time | Plays | Yards | TOP | Team | Scoring information | New Mexico State | Bowling Green |
|---|---|---|---|---|---|---|---|---|
| 1 | 9:39 | 8 | 70 | 4:05 | New Mexico State | Star Thomas 15-yard touchdown reception from Diego Pavia, Ethan Albertson kick good | 7 | 0 |
| 2 | 7:36 | 10 | 80 | 4:11 | New Mexico State | Eric Marsh 2-yard touchdown reception from Diego Pavia, Ethan Albertson kick good | 14 | 0 |
| 3 | 11:15 | 7 | 57 | 3:39 | New Mexico State | 35-yard field goal by Ethan Albertson | 17 | 0 |
| 3 | 11:02 | | | 0:13 | Bowling Green | Kickoff returned 75 yards for touchdown by Ta'Ron Keith, Mason Lawler kick good | 17 | 7 |
| 3 | 3:26 | 2 | 53 | 0:45 | New Mexico State | Ahmonte Watkins 45-yard touchdown run, Ethan Albertson kick good | 24 | 7 |
| 4 | 14:55 | 9 | 34 | 3:31 | Bowling Green | 49-yard field goal by Mason Lawler | 24 | 10 |
| 4 | 7:10 | | | | Bowling Green | Punt blocked by Davion Daniels out of the back of the end zone for a safety | 24 | 12 |
| 4 | 6:27 | 2 | 48 | 0:36 | Bowling Green | Tyrone Broden 19-yard touchdown reception from Camden Orth, Mason Lawler kick good | 24 | 19 |
| "TOP" = time of possession. For other American football terms, see Glossary of American football. | | | | | | | 24 | 19 |

== Statistics ==
Team statistical comparison
| Statistic | New Mexico State | Bowling Green |
|---|---|---|
| First downs | 21 | 17 |
| First downs rushing | 13 | 5 |
| First downs passing | 7 | 11 |
| First downs penalty | 1 | 1 |
| Third down efficiency | 11–17 | 3–9 |
| Fourth down efficiency | 0–1 | 0–0 |
| Total plays–net yards | 70–407 | 47–294 |
| Rushing attempts–net yards | 41–240 | 21–84 |
| Yards per rush | 5.9 | 4.0 |
| Yards passing | 167 | 221 |
| Pass completions–attempts | 17–29 | 16–26 |
| Interceptions thrown | 1 | 1 |
| Punt returns–total yards | 1–0 | 0–0 |
| Kickoff returns–total yards | 2–38 | 5–175 |
| Punts–average yardage | 4–23.8 | 2–38.5 |
| Fumbles–lost | 1–0 | 1–1 |
| Penalties–yards | 8–54 | 5–46 |
| Time of possession | 38:10 | 21:50 |

New Mexico State statistics
Aggies passing
| | C–A | Yds | TD–INT |
|---|---|---|---|
| Diego Pavia | 17–29 | 167 | 2–1 |
Aggies rushing
| | Car | Yds | TD |
| Ahmonte Watkins | 9 | 76 | 1 |
| Diego Pavia | 12 | 65 | 0 |
| Star Thomas | 9 | 48 | 0 |
| Jonathan Brady | 1 | 37 | 0 |
| Jamoni Jones | 9 | 15 | 0 |
Aggies receiving
| | Rec | Yds | TD |
| Kordell David | 5 | 54 | 0 |
| Jonathan Brady | 4 | 43 | 0 |
| Justice Powers | 1 | 42 | 0 |
| Star Thomas | 2 | 18 | 1 |
| Thomaz Whitford | 1 | 6 | 0 |
| Eric March | 1 | 2 | 1 |
| Jamoni Jones | 1 | 1 | 0 |
| Bryce Childress | 2 | 1 | 0 |

Bowling Green statistics
Falcons passing
| | C–A | Yds | TD–INT |
|---|---|---|---|
| Camden Orth | 14–22 | 191 | 1–0 |
| Matt McDonald | 2–4 | 30 | 0–1 |
Falcons rushing
| | Car | Yds | TD |
| Jaison Patterson | 6 | 23 | 0 |
| Camden Orth | 4 | 16 | 0 |
| Jamal Johnson | 4 | 15 | 0 |
| Matt McDonald | 1 | 11 | 0 |
| Ta'ron Keith | 6 | 8 | 0 |
Falcons receiving
| | Rec | Yds | TD |
| Ta'ron Keith | 3 | 69 | 0 |
| Christian Sims | 4 | 56 | 0 |
| Odieu Hiliare | 4 | 43 | 0 |
| Tyrone Broden | 2 | 33 | 1 |
| Austin Osborne | 2 | 19 | 0 |
| Harold Fannin Jr. | 1 | 1 | 0 |

== Aftermath ==
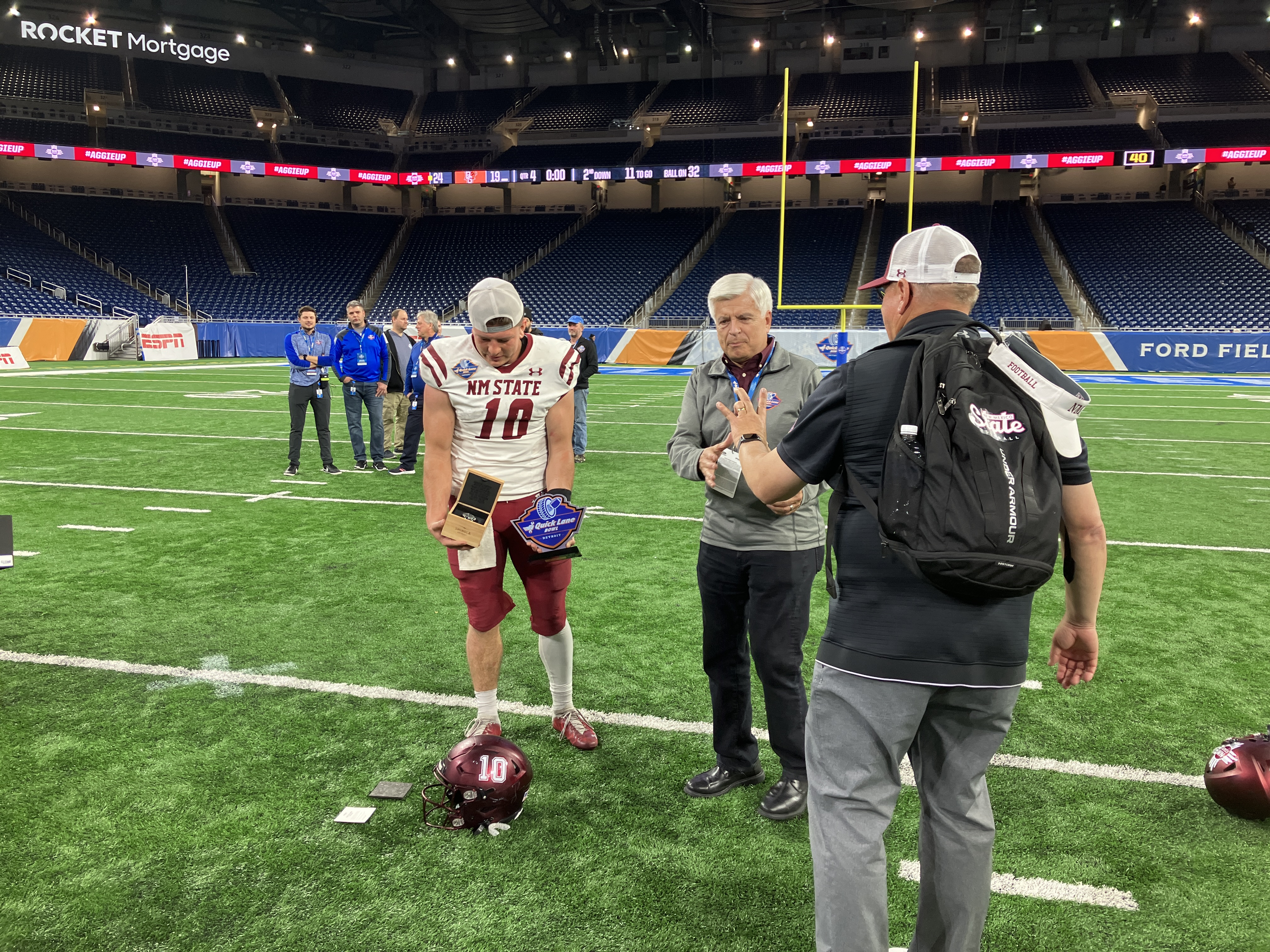
New Mexico State quarterback Diego Pavia with the MVP trophy

The game improved New Mexico State's record to 7–6 and dropped Bowling Green to 6–7 to finish the year. The game was the sixth bowl appearance for New Mexico State head coach Jerry Kill but only his first win after he lost the previous five. The Aggies' win made the 2022 season just the second in the last twenty years in which they won at least seven games; they will look to make a bowl in 2023 as C–USA members, which would mark their first back-to-back bowl appearances since 1959–1960.

New Mexico State quarterback Diego Pavia was named most valuable player.
