= Detroit Bowl =

Detroit Bowl may refer to one of the following bowl games, in the sport of college football, contested in Detroit, Michigan:

- Motor City Bowl, contested 2002–2008 (five earlier editions contested in Pontiac, Michigan)
- Little Caesars Pizza Bowl, contested 2009–2013
- Quick Lane Bowl, contested 2014–2023
- GameAbove Sports Bowl, contested 2024–2025

== See also ==
- List of college bowl games
