= 2018 Quick Lane Bowl =

College football bowl game

- 5th Quick Lane Bowl
Minnesota Golden Gophers	Georgia Tech Yellow Jackets
(6–6)	(7–5)
Big Ten	ACC
34	10
Head coach: P. J. Fleck	Head coach: Paul Johnson
	1	2	3	4	Total
Minnesota	10	3	7	14	34
Georgia Tech	0	3	7	0	10
- Date: December 26, 2018
- Season: 2018
- Stadium: Ford Field
- Location: Detroit, Michigan
- MVP: Mohamed Ibrahim (RB, Minnesota)
- Favorite: Georgia Tech by 4
- Referee: Scott Campbell (Big XII)
- Attendance: 27,228
- Payout: US$750,000

United States TV coverage
- Network: ESPN
- Announcers: Mark Neely, Ray Bentley and Allison Williams

The 2018 Quick Lane Bowl was a college football bowl game played on December 26, 2018, at Ford Field in Detroit. It was the fifth edition of the Quick Lane Bowl, and one of the 2018–19 bowl games concluding the 2018 FBS football season. The game was sponsored by Quick Lane tire and auto centers.

== Teams ==
The game was contested between Minnesota from the Big Ten Conference and Georgia Tech from the Atlantic Coast Conference (ACC). This was the first meeting between these teams.

=== Minnesota Golden Gophers ===
Minnesota received and accepted a bid to the Quick Lane Bowl on December 2. The Golden Gophers entered the bowl with a 6–6 record (3–6 in conference).

=== Georgia Tech Yellow Jackets ===
Georgia Tech received and accepted a bid to the Quick Lane Bowl on December 2. The Yellow Jackets entered the bowl with a 7–5 record (5–3 in conference). In the weeks prior to the game, head coach Paul Johnson announced that this would be his last game coaching.

== Game summary ==
=== Scoring summary ===
Scoring summary

Quarter	Time	Drive			Team	Scoring information	Score	
Quarter	Time	Plays	Yards	TOP	Team	Scoring information	MINN	GT
1	9:42	10	62	5:18	MINN	31-yard field goal by Emmit Carpenter	3	0
1	4:14	7	48	3:11	MINN	Tyler Johnson 18-yard touchdown reception from Tanner Morgan, Emmit Carpenter kick good	10	0
2	11:57	9	26	5:14	MINN	27-yard field goal by Emmit Carpenter	13	0
2	0:00	4	37	0:18	GT	44-yard field goal by Wesley Wells	13	3
3	8:24	5	60	2:50	MINN	Mohamed Ibrahim 3-yard touchdown run, Emmit Carpenter kick good	20	3
3	0:55	14	75	7:23	GT	Nathan Cottrell 20-yard touchdown run, Wesley Wells kick good	20	10
4	12:07	7	75	3:48	MINN	Mohamed Ibrahim 1-yard touchdown run, Emmit Carpenter kick good	27	10
4	6:19	6	73	3:30	MINN	Tyler Johnson 30-yard touchdown reception from Tanner Morgan, Emmit Carpenter kick good	34	10
"TOP" = time of possession. For other American football terms, see Glossary of American football.							34	10

=== Statistics ===
	1	2	3	4	Total
Golden Gophers	10	3	7	14	34
Yellow Jackets	0	3	7	0	10

Statistics	MINN	GT
First downs	19	14
Plays–yards	56–392	56–283
Rushes–yards	43–260	44–206
Passing yards	132	77
Passing: comp–att–int	7–13–0	5–12–0
Turnovers		
Time of possession	30:43	29:17

Team	Category	Player	Statistics
Minnesota	Passing	Tanner Morgan	7/13, 132 yds, 2 TD
Minnesota	Rushing	Mohamed Ibrahim	31 car, 224 yds, 2 TD
Minnesota	Receiving	Tyler Johnson	4 rec, 57 yds, 2 TD
Georgia Tech	Passing	TaQuon Marshall	4/9, 76 yds
Georgia Tech	Rushing	TaQuon Marshall	22 car, 75 yds
Georgia Tech	Receiving	Qua Searcy	1 rec, 51 yds
