= Scot Loeffler =

American football player and coach (born 1974)

Personal information
- Born: November 1, 1974 (age 52); Barberton, Ohio, U.S.

Career information
- Position: Quarterback
- High school: Barberton
- College: Michigan (1993–1996)

Career history
- Michigan (1996–1997) Student assistant; Michigan (1998–1999) Graduate assistant; Central Michigan (2000–2001) Quarterbacks coach; Michigan (2002–2007) Quarterbacks coach; Detroit Lions (2008) Quarterbacks coach; Florida (2009–2010) Quarterbacks coach; Temple (2011) Offensive coordinator & quarterbacks coach; Auburn (2012) Offensive coordinator & quarterbacks coach; Virginia Tech (2013–2015) Offensive coordinator & quarterbacks coach; Boston College (2016–2018) Offensive coordinator & quarterbacks coach; Bowling Green (2019–2024) Head coach; Philadelphia Eagles (2025) Quarterbacks coach

Head coaching record
- Regular season: 27–38 (NCAA)
- Postseason: 0–3 (NCAA)
- Career: 27–41 (NCAA)

Scot Loeffler (born November 1, 1974) is an American college football coach and former player who was most recently the quarterbacks coach for the Philadelphia Eagles of the National Football League (NFL). Prior to that, he was the head coach at Bowling Green State University. He formerly served as offensive coordinator and quarterbacks coach at Boston College Virginia Tech, having previously held the same role at Auburn University under head coach Gene Chizik. Prior to joining Auburn, Loeffler served as offensive coordinator for Temple. He has spent over a decade coaching quarterbacks, primarily in the Big Ten and Southeastern conferences. On November 28, 2018, Loeffler was named head coach at BGSU.

== Career ==
=== Early career ===
Loeffler played quarterback for the Michigan Wolverines from 1993 to 1996. After suffering a shoulder injury that prematurely ended his playing career, Loeffler joined Lloyd Carr's coaching staff at his alma mater as a graduate assistant, and was a part of the Wolverine staff during the 1997 undefeated, national championship season. Jim Herrmann - the team's defensive coordinator from 1997 to 2005 - would later state that Loeffler helped develop future NFL quarterbacks Tom Brady and Brian Griese in his early coaching tenure, particularly by focusing on throwing mechanics. In 2000, Loeffler was named quarterbacks coach at Central Michigan University. After coaching the Chippewas for two years, Loeffler returned to coaching quarterbacks at Michigan for the next six years.

In 2008, the Detroit Lions of the National Football League hired Loeffler to be a part of their offensive staff. However, after only one season out of the college ranks, Loeffler was hired by Urban Meyer to join his staff at Florida. Loeffler served as quarterbacks coach, where in his first season he was tasked with helping Tim Tebow become a more polished pro-style quarterback. Tebow finished the season ranked 1st in passer efficiency.

=== Temple ===
When Steve Addazio was let go from Florida to eventually become the new head coach at Temple University, he brought Loeffler along as the new offensive coordinator and quarterbacks coach. Under his leadership, the Owls offense improved to the 7th leading rushing offense in the nation (257 yards per game) and 33rd nationally in pass efficiency (142.8). The team finished the season 9–4, ranked 2nd in the MAC East and defeated Wyoming 37–15 in the 2011 New Mexico Bowl (the school's first bowl win since the 1979 Garden State Bowl). Sophomore quarterback Chris Coyer was named the bowl's MVP and finished the season with a 177.4 passer rating.

Following the season, Loeffler was linked to the vacant OC positions at the University of Alabama, Louisiana State University and the University of Wisconsin.

=== Auburn ===
On January 22, 2012, head coach Gene Chizik hired Loeffler to serve as offensive coordinator and quarterbacks coach at Auburn.

At the end of the 2012 season, Chizik was fired by Auburn. Former offensive coordinator Gus Malzahn was hired as head coach on December 4, 2012. Shortly after being hired, Malzahn announced that all assistant coaches were being released, thus ending Loeffler's career at Auburn University. The offense finished the season dead last in the SEC in total yds/gm and pass yds/gm at 305 and 156.6, respectively. They also finished second to last with 18.7 pts/gm.

=== Virginia Tech ===
On January 18, 2013, Virginia Tech head coach Frank Beamer announced Loeffler's hiring as one of three new Hokies offensive assistants, along with offensive line coach Jeff Grimes (also formerly of Auburn) and wide receivers coach Aaron Moorehead (formerly of Stanford University). Loeffler was not retained following the retirement of Beamer after the 2015 season and the hiring of Justin Fuente.

=== Boston College ===
On January 12, 2016, Loeffler was hired by Boston College as their offensive coordinator, reuniting him with Addazio.

=== Bowling Green ===
On November 28, 2018, Loeffler was hired as the head coach of Bowling Green State University. Loeffler was taking over a Falcon program riddled by APR and off-field issues, as well as a team that in the last regime fell apart under Mike Jinks. Jinks took over with Bowling Green coming off of 3 straight MAC East Championships, winning the MAC twice and went just 4–8, 2–10, and 1–7 before being fired. Loeffler detailed a rebuilding plan that would take time. With just 2 scholarship quarterbacks on the roster, one a transfer and one a former walk-on, Loeffler's Falcons went 3–9 in 2019. The season was highlighted by beating BGSU's biggest rival Toledo for the first time in a decade. BG was a 30-point underdog at home. The COVID 2020 season went 0–5. The 2021 season saw an improved 4–8 record, highlighted by a massive 38-point upset at Minnesota, 14–10. The 2022 season started off tough, with an FCS loss to EKU in 7 overtimes, followed by a homecoming win over Marshall who had just beaten 8th-ranked Notre Dame the week before. The Falcons started off MAC play 1–1, suffering a blowout loss to Buffalo but then won their next 3 conference games. BGSU finished the 2022 season 6–6, and was ranked 3rd in the MAC East with a 5–3 conference record. It received an invitation to play New Mexico State in the 2022 Quick Lane Bowl, losing by a 24–19 score. In 2023, BGSU started out 1–3 before upsetting Georgia Tech in Atlanta, and then going 5–2 to finish the season with a 7–5 record. The Falcons lost to Minnesota, 30–24, in the 2023 Quick Lane Bowl.

On October 30, 2021, Loeffler became the first head coach to be ejected for two unsportsmanlike conduct calls.

=== Philadelphia Eagles ===
On February 28, 2025, Loeffler left Bowling Green to join the Philadelphia Eagles as their quarterbacks coach. He was fired, along with offensive coordinator Kevin Patullo, after the season. The Eagles finished 24th in total offense and 23rd in passing offense during his one season in charge.

== Personal life ==
Loeffler received his bachelor's degree from the University of Michigan in 1996 and a graduate degree in history and political science in 1998. He earned the Michigan Athletic Academic Achievement award during the 1997–98 academic year. Loeffler has a son, Luke, from his first marriage and two children, Alexis and Mary Elizabeth, with his current wife, Amie. He was a college quarterback coach to Tom Brady and is reported to be one of his closest friends.

== Head coaching record ==
Year	Team	Overall	Conference	Standing	Bowl/playoffs
Bowling Green Falcons (Mid-American Conference) (2019–2024)
2019	Bowling Green	3–9	2–6	5th (East)	
2020	Bowling Green	0–5	0–5	6th (East)	
2021	Bowling Green	4–8	2–6	T–4th (East)	
2022	Bowling Green	6–7	5–3	T–2nd (East)	L Quick Lane
2023	Bowling Green	7–6	5–3	3rd (East)	L Quick Lane
2024	Bowling Green	7–6	6–2	T–3rd	L 68 Ventures
Bowling Green:		27–41	20–25		
Total:		27–41			
