= 2018 Georgia Tech Yellow Jackets football team =

American college football season

2018 Georgia Tech Yellow Jackets football

Quick Lane Bowl, L 10–34 vs. Minnesota
- Conference: Atlantic Coast Conference
- Coastal Division
- Record: 7–6 (5–3 ACC)
- Head coach: Paul Johnson (11th season)
- Offensive scheme: Flexbone triple option
- Defensive coordinator: Nate Woody (1st season)
- Base defense: Multiple 3–4
- Home stadium: Bobby Dodd Stadium

Uniform
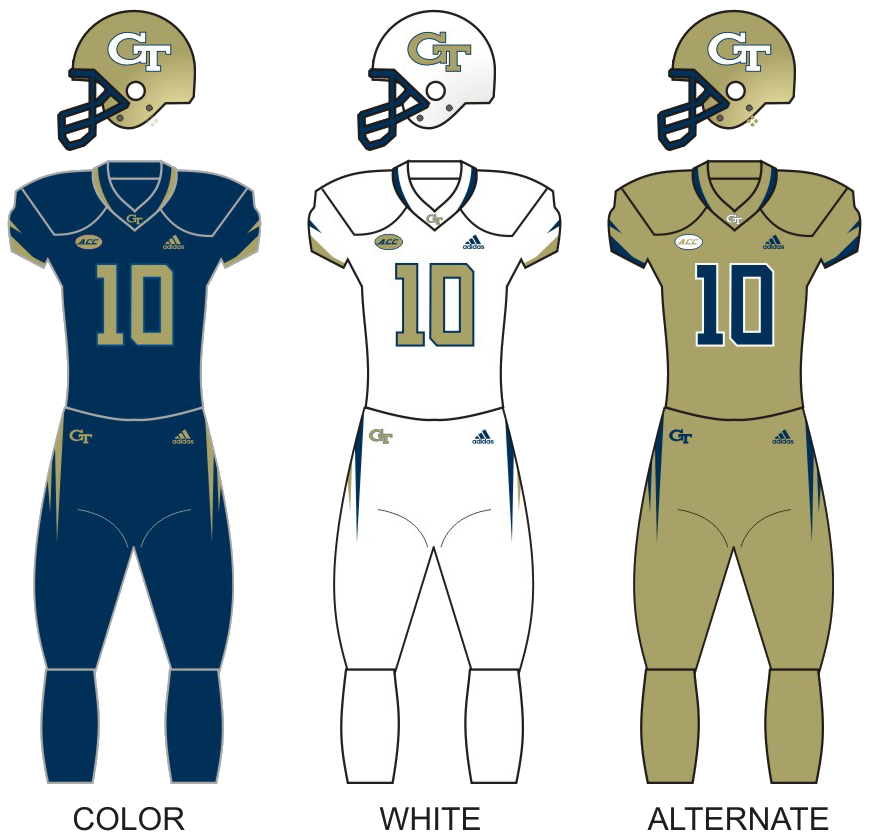

2018 Atlantic Coast Conference football standings
	Conf.			Overall
Team	W		L	W		L
Atlantic Division
No. 1 Clemson x$#^	8	–	0	15	–	0
No. 15 Syracuse	6	–	2	10	–	3
NC State	5	–	3	9	–	4
Boston College	4	–	4	7	–	5
Wake Forest	3	–	5	7	–	6
Florida State	3	–	5	5	–	7
Louisville	0	–	8	2	–	10
Coastal Division
Pittsburgh x	6	–	2	7	–	7
Georgia Tech	5	–	3	7	–	6
Miami (FL)	4	–	4	7	–	6
Virginia	4	–	4	8	–	5
Virginia Tech	4	–	4	6	–	7
Duke	3	–	5	8	–	5
North Carolina	1	–	7	2	–	9
Championship: Clemson 42, Pittsburgh 10
# – College Football Playoff champion; ^ – College Football Playoff participant; $ – Conference champion; x – Division champion/co-champions; Rankings from AP Poll

The 2018 Georgia Tech Yellow Jackets football team represented the Georgia Institute of Technology during the 2018 NCAA Division I FBS football season. The Yellow Jackets were led by head coach Paul Johnson in his eleventh season on the job. They played their home games at Bobby Dodd Stadium. They competed as a member of the Coastal Division of the Atlantic Coast Conference (ACC). They finished the season 7–6, 5–3 in ACC play to finish in second place in the Coastal Division. They were invited to the Quick Lane Bowl where they lost to Minnesota.

On November 28, 2018, Johnson announced his retirement effectively after Georgia Tech's bowl game. On December 7, Temple head coach Geoff Collins, a former grad assistant and recruiting coordinator for Georgia Tech, was named Johnson's successor.

== Preseason ==
=== Award watch lists ===
Listed in the order that they were released

Award	Player	Position	Year
Rimington Trophy	Kenny Cooper	C	JR
Maxwell Award	TaQuon Marshall	QB	SR
Maxwell Award	KirVonte Benson	RB	JR
Doak Walker Award	KirVonte Benson	RB	JR
Outland Trophy	Parker Braun	G	JR
Ray Guy Award	Pressley Harvin III	P	SO
Wuerffel Trophy	Brad Stewart	WR	SR
Earl Campbell Tyler Rose Award	Parker Braun	OL	JR

=== ACC media poll ===
The ACC media poll was released on July 24, 2018.

Media poll (Coastal)
Predicted finish	Team	Votes (1st place)
1	Miami	998 (122)
2	Virginia Tech	838 (16)
3	Georgia Tech	654 (8)
4	Duke	607 (1)
5	Pittsburgh	420
6	North Carolina	370 (1)
7	Virginia	257

== Schedule ==
Date	Time	Opponent	Site	TV	Result	Attendance
September 1	12:30 p.m.	Alcorn State*	Bobby Dodd Stadium; Atlanta, GA	ACCRSN	W 41–0	39,719
September 8	12:00 p.m.	at South Florida*	Raymond James Stadium; Tampa, FL	ABC/ESPN2	L 38–49	34,182
September 15	12:30 p.m.	at Pittsburgh	Heinz Field; Pittsburgh, PA	ACCRSN	L 19–24	34,284
September 22	3:30 p.m.	No. 3 Clemson	Bobby Dodd Stadium; Atlanta, GA (rivalry)	ABC	L 21–49	50,595
September 29	12:00 p.m.	Bowling Green*	Bobby Dodd Stadium; Atlanta, GA	ACCRSN	W 63–17	40,740
October 5	7:00 p.m.	at Louisville	Cardinal Stadium; Louisville, KY	ESPN	W 66–31	51,658
October 13	12:20 p.m.	Duke^{†}	Bobby Dodd Stadium; Atlanta, GA	ACCN	L 14–28	41,709
October 25	7:30 p.m.	at Virginia Tech	Lane Stadium; Blacksburg, VA (Battle of the Techs)	ESPN	W 49–28	65,632
November 3	12:00 p.m.	at North Carolina	Kenan Memorial Stadium; Chapel Hill, NC	ACCN	W 38–28	40,782
November 10	7:00 p.m.	Miami (FL)	Bobby Dodd Stadium; Atlanta, GA	ESPN2	W 27–21	48,217
November 17	3:30 p.m.	Virginia	Bobby Dodd Stadium; Atlanta, GA	ACCRSN	W 30–27 ^{OT}	37,543
November 24	12:00 p.m.	at No. 5 Georgia*	Sanford Stadium; Athens, GA (Clean, Old-Fashioned Hate)	SECN	L 21–45	92,746
December 26	5:15 p.m.	vs. Minnesota*	Ford Field; Detroit, MI (Quick Lane Bowl)	ESPN	L 10–34	27,228
*Non-conference game; ^{†}Homecoming; Rankings from AP Poll released prior to the game; All times are in Eastern time

== Game summaries ==
=== Alcorn State ===
	1	2	3	4	Total
Braves	0	0	0	0	0
Yellow Jackets	7	13	21	0	41

Georgia Tech put up its first shutout in 5 years as they defeated a FCS to open the season.

=== At South Florida ===
	1	2	3	4	Total
Yellow Jackets	17	0	14	7	38
Bulls	14	7	7	21	49

Quarterback Blake Barnett of South Florida, formerly the #1 recruit out of high school and transfer from Alabama and Arizona State University rushed and passed for two touchdowns each as USF erased a 10-point deficit late in the 4th quarter to hand Georgia Tech its first loss of the season. It would be USF's 6th win out of 7 chances against Power Five conferences.

=== At Pittsburgh ===
	1	2	3	4	Total
Yellow Jackets	0	0	6	13	19
Panthers	14	7	3	0	24

Coming off a stinging loss to Penn State the week before, the Pitt defense rebounded mightily holding Tech to only 386 total yards. Questionable calls by Tech coach Paul Johnson were criticized such as a fake punt call in the first quarter on Tech's own 28-yard line and a 4th-down pass attempt at the Pitt 23-yard line in the 2nd quarter. Johnson later took responsibility for the bad play calls. "If we can't throw a pass that is eight yards and catch it, then that's a bad call," Johnson said. "That was a bad call. It was on me."

=== Clemson ===
	1	2	3	4	Total
No. 3 Tigers	7	21	14	7	49
Yellow Jackets	0	7	7	7	21

Georgia Tech completed just three passes and was held to 146 yards on the ground, nowhere near its nation-high rushing average of 392.7 coming into the game. Trevor Lawrence came into the game in the 2nd quarter and helped Clemson dominate despite Tech cutting the lead down to two touchdowns late in the first half off a TaQuon Marshall touchdown. Much of Bobby Dodd Stadium was filled with roaring Clemson fans on a hot afternoon. Coach Johnson said "we got our tails kicked."

=== Bowling Green ===
	1	2	3	4	Total
Falcons	3	7	7	0	17
Yellow Jackets	14	14	21	14	63

Georgia Tech came into the game with the nation's best rushing attack while conversely, Bowling Green came into the game with the worst rushing defense in the nation. With a 41-yard reception in the second quarter, senior wingback Clinton Lynch became the first player in Georgia Tech history to achieve 1,000 career rushing yards (1,138) and 1,000 career receiving yards (1,015) as Tech snapped its 3-game losing streak by dominating FBS Bowling Green.

=== At Louisville ===
	1	2	3	4	Total
Yellow Jackets	21	10	14	21	66
Cardinals	0	17	0	14	31

Georgia Tech would score on each of its first nine drives, eight of which were for touchdowns, as Tech ran for a season high 542 yards in their first meeting with Louisville. It was Tech's 6th most point total in the modern era and first road win since the 2016 TaxSlayer Bowl.

=== Duke ===
	1	2	3	4	Total
Blue Devils	7	0	21	0	28
Yellow Jackets	0	7	0	7	14

Duke's quarterback Daniel Jones converted three Georgia Tech fumbles late in the 3rd quarter for three touchdowns all in a span of about 3 minutes. It would be Duke's second straight win over Georgia Tech and fourth win in five seasons. Duke Coach David Cutcliffe stated that his squad's preparation to handle Tech's spread option offense starts every spring pre-season.

=== At Virginia Tech ===
	1	2	3	4	Total
Yellow Jackets	14	14	14	7	49
Hokies	14	7	0	7	28

For this Thursday night matchup, Virginia Tech had taken a 21–14 lead and forced a punt by Georgia Tech's offense that was fumbled and recovered by Georgia Tech and led to a 12-yard TD drive. GT would dominate from there on Tobias Oliver's first start at QB where Georgia Tech gained 465 yards on offense, all rushing. It was Virginia Tech's most rushing yards given up since 1973 against SMU. That year was also the last time Virginia Tech had given up over 45 points to 3 different teams in one season until Georgia Tech's performance for this game.

=== At North Carolina ===
	1	2	3	4	Total
Yellow Jackets	7	14	7	10	38
Tar Heels	7	3	10	8	28

Georgia Tech quarterback Tobias Oliver rushed for 120 yards and 2 TD while going 2/2 passing for 104 yards and 1 TD. Tech fumbled twice in the 2nd half allowing UNC to rally late and tie the game. Tech retook the lead off Oliver's second rushing touchdown of the game. UNC got the ball back the ensuing drive until Tech defensive lineman Anree Saint-Amour dropped back in coverage and intercepted UNC's Nathan Elliott's pass to halt their penultimate drive with 2:44 left. Tech would drive down and kick a field goal with 46 seconds left to seal the win.

=== Miami (FL) ===
	1	2	3	4	Total
Hurricanes	7	7	0	7	21
Yellow Jackets	14	3	10	0	27

Georgia Tech came out on top in what ended up being an atypical game with Miami that included a fumbled kickoff return, a muffed punt, and less than 110 combined plays. Miami received the opening kickoff and moved easily down the field for a 7–0 lead before Tech matched it. The fumbled kickoff followed shortly after, giving Tech the ball near the Miami red zone. After scoring to take a 14–7 lead, Tech was able to force a Miami punt. Tech was held to a 3 and out and punted back to Miami. The Tech defense forced a short 3rd and 1, which led Miami to go under center for one of the few times that night. Miami fumbled the snap and Tech recovered the ball on the Miami 39. Tech ended this drive in a field goal, making the score 17–7. On Miami's next drive, the Canes had a 3rd and 30+ due to penalties. As expected, this led to a punt for Miami. Not so expected was the low, rugby-style kick that never reached 10 feet from the ground, but was able to contact Tech's Nathan Cottrell, who was running down the field to block for the returner. Miami quickly jumped on the ball and was given a renewed set of downs, which they turned into a touchdown to make the score 17–14 Tech shortly before half time. Tech's drive to open the 3rd quarter resulted in a 3 and out, leading to the second of 3 GT punts on the night. The punt was further than the Miami returner was expecting, which caused him to attempt a catch over his shoulder. The returner muffed the punt and was pushed out of the way by GT's Juanyeh Thomas, who recovered the ball at the Miami 10-yard line. Tech was held to a field goal on the short field to make the score 20–14. Miami was then held to a 3 and out, which was followed by a Tech drive for a touchdown (27–14), scored on a 31-yard pass from Taquon Marshall to Brad Stewart. Miami was forced to punt again after a 6-play drive, giving Tech the ball just before the 4th quarter. Tech was forced to punt, but only after they bled 5 minutes off the clock. Miami then scored a touchdown, making the score 27–21, but leaving only 6:43 on the clock. Georgia Tech was then able to close out the game by converting 3 3rd downs, including an impressive 22-yard pass to Jalen Camp, and an 11-yard run from Jerry Howard. With the win, GT became bowl eligible.

=== Virginia ===
	1	2	3	4	OT	Total
Cavaliers	14	7	0	6	0	27
Yellow Jackets	13	3	0	11	3	30

In the span of just 11 seconds, Georgia Tech turned an early 7–3 deficit into a 13–7 lead. Virginia, backed up on its own 1 after a punt, had its quarterback Bryce Perkins take a snap in the end zone and rolled left to throw, only to be grabbed by Georgia Tech's Brant Mitchell and finished off by 325-pound nose tackle Brandon Adams for a safety. Juanyeh Thomas then returned the free kick 77 yards for a touchdown and Marshall ran for a 2-point conversion. The safety injured Perkins in what seemed as a serious injury at the time, but only wound up keeping him out of the game for one series.

After several lead changes, Georgia Tech's Brad Stewart caught the only pass of the game for the Yellow Jackets on a 3rd down to extend the drive and set up a field goal by Wesley Wells to go ahead late in the 4th quarter. Virginia would storm back down the field and kick a game-tying field goal by Brian Delaney towards the end of regulation to set up an overtime contest. Virginia won the toss and held Tech to a field goal. After Tech forced a field goal attempt on Virginia's part, Delaney kicked the ball wide left after a no call on false start by the Virginia offensive line resulting in a Georgia Tech victory.

The win guaranteed Georgia Tech's 2nd-place finish in the ACC Coastal division as Pitt had clinched the division earlier that day with a win over Wake Forest.

=== At Georgia ===
	1	2	3	4	Total
Yellow Jackets	7	0	0	14	21
No. 5 Bulldogs	14	24	7	0	45

Georgia Tech came in to Athens, GA defending a 2-game win streak in the home of the Bulldogs, but were limited to a season low in rushing yards. UGA scored on every drive of the first half all with different personnel. UGA pulled some of their first string starters in the 2nd half which led Tech to have some late touchdowns, but was not able to get over the insurmountable Georgia lead. The victory, combined with a #4 ranked Michigan loss to Ohio State propelled Georgia into #4 in the country heading into the 2018 SEC Championship Game against Alabama.

Days after the defeat, Coach Paul Johnson of Georgia Tech announced his retirement pending the conclusion of Tech's bowl game at the end of the season.

=== Vs. Minnesota (Quick Lane Bowl) ===
	1	2	3	4	Total
Yellow Jackets	0	3	7	0	10
Golden Gophers	10	3	7	14	34

== Rankings ==
Ranking movements Legend: ██ Increase in ranking ██ Decrease in ranking — = Not ranked RV = Received votes
	Week															
Poll	Pre	1	2	3	4	5	6	7	8	9	10	11	12	13	14	Final
AP	—	RV	—	—	—	—	—	—	—	—	—	—	RV	—	—	—
Coaches	—	RV	—	—	—	—	—	—	—	—	—	—	RV	—	—	—
CFP	Not released									—	—	—	—	—	—	Not released
