= Odieu Hiliare =

American gridiron football player (born 2001)

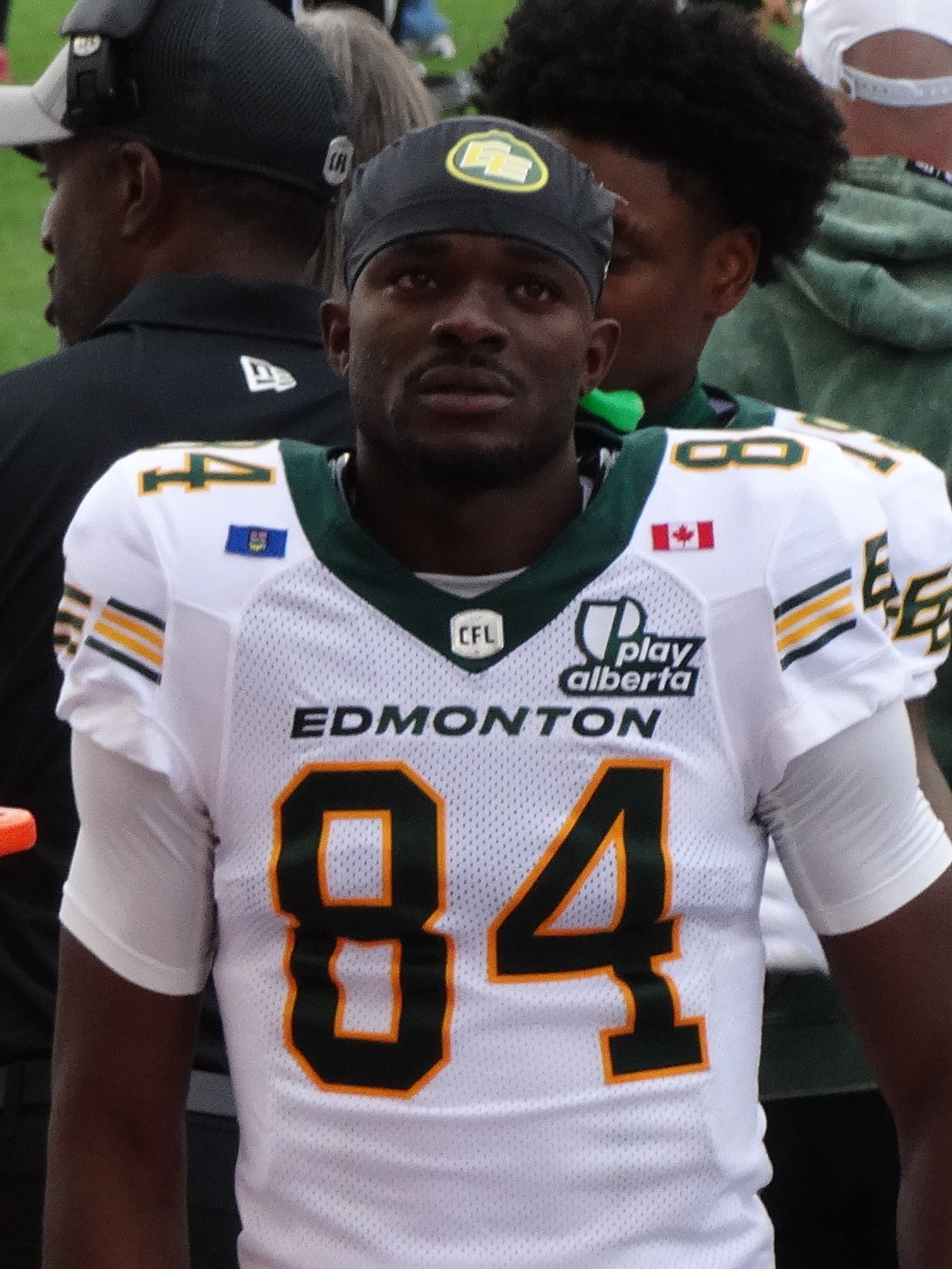
- Hiliare with the Edmonton Elks in 2025

No. 84 – Edmonton Elks
- Position: Wide receiver
- Roster status: Suspended
- CFL status: American

Personal information
- Born: February 12, 2001 (age 25)
- Listed height: 6 ft 0 in (1.83 m)
- Listed weight: 185 lb (84 kg)

Career information
- High school: Glades Central (Belle Glade, Florida)
- College: Alabama A&M (2019–2021); Bowling Green (2022–2023)
- NFL draft: 2024: undrafted

Career history
- Atlanta Falcons (2024)*; Hamilton Tiger-Cats (2024)*; Edmonton Elks (2025–present)
- * Offseason or practice squad member only

Awards and highlights
- Second-team All-MAC (2022); Third-team All-MAC (2023)
- Stats at CFL.ca

Odieu "O.J." Hiliare (born February 12, 2001) is an American professional football wide receiver for the Edmonton Elks of the Canadian Football League (CFL). Hiliare played college football for the Alabama A&M Bulldogs and the Bowling Green Falcons. He also had a stint in the National Football League (NFL) with the Atlanta falcons.

== College career ==
Hiliare played college football for the Alabama A&M Bulldogs from 2019 to 2021 and the Bowling Green Falcons from 2022 to 2023. He played in 22 games at Alabama A&M, recording 103 receptions, for 1,365 receiving yards and 13 receiving touchdowns. At the end of the 2021 season he entered the NCAA transfer portal, landing at Bowling Green.

In 2022, he appeared in 13 games, starting in 8, and finished with 58 catches for 747 yards and six touchdowns. Against Toledo, Hiliare set a career-high 246 receiving yards on eight receptions and two touchdowns, receiving MAC East Offensive Player of the week and setting the third-highest single game receiving yard total in team history. He earned second-team All-MAC honors in his first season at Bowling Green.

Hiliare played in all 13 games, starting in 10, registering 45 receptions for 532 yards and four touchdowns. In the 2023 Quick Lane Bowl against Minnesota, he had 10 catches for 152 yards and one touchdown. He was included in the third-team All-MAC team at the end of the 2023 season.

=== Statistics ===
Year	Team	Games		Receiving			
Year	Team	GP	GS	Rec	Yds	Avg	TD
2019	Alabama A&M	10	1	14	214	15.3	0
2020	Alabama A&M	4	1	17	233	13.7	4
2021	Alabama A&M	10	10	71	918	12.9	9
2022	Bowling Green	13	9	58	747	12.9	6
2023	Bowling Green	13	10	45	532	11.8	4
FCS totals		24	12	102	1,365	13.4	13
FBS totals		26	19	103	1,279	12.4	10

== Professional career ==
Pre-draft measurables
Height	Weight	Arm length	Hand span	Wingspan	40-yard dash	10-yard split	20-yard split	20-yard shuttle	Three-cone drill	Vertical jump	Broad jump	Bench press
5 ft 11 in (1.80 m)	182 lb (83 kg)	31 1/2 in (0.80 m)	9 3/4 in (0.25 m)	6 ft 4 1/8 in (1.93 m)	4.58 s	1.58 s	2.65 s	4.38 s	7.21 s	32.5 in (0.83 m)	10 ft 2 in (3.10 m)	13 reps
All values from Pro Day

=== Atlanta Falcons ===
After not being selected in the 2024 NFL draft, Hiliare signed with the Atlanta Falcons as an undrafted free agent. He was released on August 27, 2024, ahead of the roster cut deadline.

=== Hamilton Tiger-Cats ===
On September 17, 2024, the Hamilton Tiger-Cats signed Hiliare to the practice roster. He was released on October 26. On November 20, he re-signed with the team. On June 1, 2025, the Tiger-Cats released Hiliare.

=== Edmonton Elks ===
On August 19, 2025, the Edmonton Elks signed Hiliare to the practice roster. He was promoted to the active roster on August 27. Hiliare made his professional debut against the Calgary Stampeders on September 1, 2025, in the Labour Day Classic, where he recorded three catches for 23 yards.

== Career statistics ==
CFL

Year	Team	Games		Receiving				
Year	Team	GD	GS	Rec	Yds	Avg	Lng	TD
2025	EDM	8	8	32	400	12.5	44	0
Career		8	8	32	400	12.5	44	0
