= 2018 Minnesota Golden Gophers football team =

American college football season

2018 Minnesota Golden Gophers football

Quick Lane Bowl champion

Quick Lane Bowl, W 34–10 vs. Georgia Tech
- Conference: Big Ten Conference
- West Division
- Record: 7–6 (3–6 Big Ten)
- Head coach: P. J. Fleck (2nd season)
- Offensive coordinator: Kirk Ciarrocca (2nd season)
- Offensive scheme: Spread
- Defensive coordinator: Robb Smith (2nd season; fired Nov. 4); Joe Rossi
- Base defense: 4–3
- Home stadium: TCF Bank Stadium

Uniform
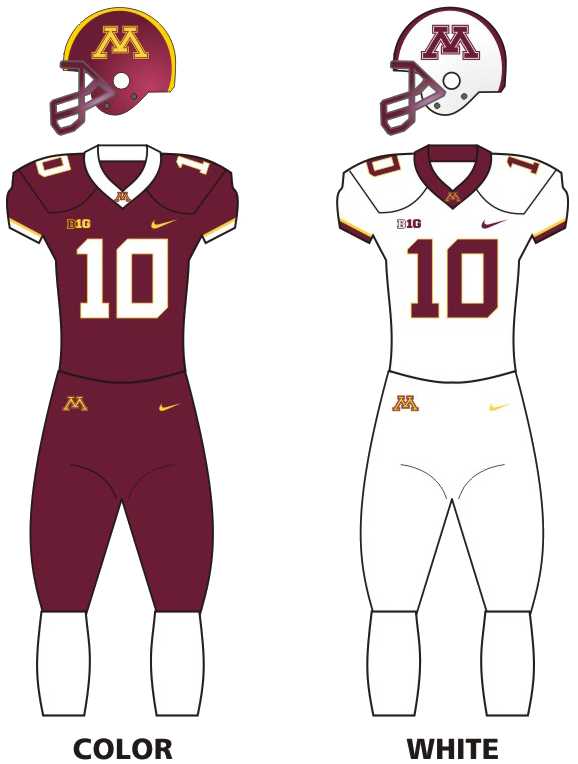

2018 Big Ten Conference football standings
	Conf.			Overall
Team	W		L	W		L
East Division
No. 3 Ohio State xy$	8	–	1	13	–	1
No. 14 Michigan x	8	–	1	10	–	3
No. 17 Penn State	6	–	3	9	–	4
Michigan State	5	–	4	7	–	6
Maryland	3	–	6	5	–	7
Indiana	2	–	7	5	–	7
Rutgers	0	–	9	1	–	11
West Division
No. 21 Northwestern xy	8	–	1	9	–	5
Wisconsin	5	–	4	8	–	5
No. 25 Iowa	5	–	4	9	–	4
Purdue	5	–	4	6	–	7
Minnesota	3	–	6	7	–	6
Nebraska	3	–	6	4	–	8
Illinois	2	–	7	4	–	8
Championship: Ohio State 45, Northwestern 24
$ – Conference champion; x – Division champion/co-champions; y – Championship game participant; Rankings from AP Poll

The 2018 Minnesota Golden Gophers football team represented the University of Minnesota in the 2018 NCAA Division I FBS football season. The Golden Gophers played their home games at TCF Bank Stadium in Minneapolis, Minnesota and competed in the West Division of the Big Ten Conference. They were led by second-year head coach P. J. Fleck.

Minnesota began the year by sweeping its non-conference slate against New Mexico State, Fresno State, and Miami (OH); but opened Big Ten Conference play with four straight losses. The team secured wins against Indiana and Purdue, and then secured bowl eligibility by defeating rival Wisconsin for the first time since 2003, and the first time on the road since 1994. The team finished the regular season tied for fifth in the Big Ten West Division with a conference record of 3–6. They were invited to the Quick Lane Bowl where they defeated Georgia Tech to end the year with an overall record of 7–6.

The team's starting quarterback was true freshman Zack Annexstad before he suffered an internal midsection injury in the game against Nebraska on October 20. He did not return for the rest of the season, and redshirt freshman Tanner Morgan took his place under center. Both Annexstad and Morgan finished with nine touchdowns on the year. The team's leading rusher was Mohamed Ibrahim, with 1,160 rushing yards; and the team's leading receiver was Tyler Johnson with 1,169 receiving yards and 12 receiving touchdowns, which tied for the conference lead. Johnson was named first-team All-Big Ten by the media voters. Defensive lineman Carter Coughlin and linebacker Blake Cashman each finished with 15 tackles for loss and were both named second-team All-Big Ten.

== Preseason ==
=== Award watch lists ===
Award	Player	Position	Year
Rimington Trophy	Jared Weyler	C	SR
Chuck Bednarik Award	Thomas Barber	LB	JR
Maxwell Award	Rodney Smith	RB	SR
Doak Walker Award	Rodney Smith	RB	SR
Butkus Award	Thomas Barber	LB	JR
Lou Groza Award	Emmit Carpenter	K	SR
Paul Hornung Award	Rodney Smith	RB/KR	JR
Wuerffel Trophy	Emmit Carpenter	K	SR

== Schedule ==
Date	Time	Opponent	Site	TV	Result	Attendance
August 30	6:00 p.m.	New Mexico State*	TCF Bank Stadium; Minneapolis, MN	BTN	W 48–10	41,291
September 8	6:30 p.m.	Fresno State*	TCF Bank Stadium; Minneapolis, MN	FS1	W 21–14	38,280
September 15	2:30 p.m.	Miami (OH)*	TCF Bank Stadium; Minneapolis, MN	BTN	W 26–3	41,162
September 22	11:00 a.m.	at Maryland	Maryland Stadium; College Park, MD	BTN	L 13–42	36,211
October 6	2:30 p.m.	Iowa^{†}	TCF Bank Stadium; Minneapolis, MN (Floyd of Rosedale)	BTN	L 31–48	48,199
October 13	11:00 a.m.	at No. 3 Ohio State	Ohio Stadium; Columbus, OH	FS1	L 14–30	100,042
October 20	2:30 p.m.	at Nebraska	Memorial Stadium; Lincoln, NE ($5 Bits of Broken Chair Trophy)	BTN	L 28–53	89,272
October 26	7:00 p.m.	Indiana	TCF Bank Stadium; Minneapolis, MN	FS1	W 38–31	33,273
November 3	2:30 p.m.	at Illinois	Memorial Stadium; Champaign, IL	BTN	L 31–55	35,774
November 10	2:30 p.m.	Purdue	TCF Bank Stadium; Minneapolis, MN	ESPN2	W 41–10	31,068
November 17	11:00 a.m.	Northwestern	TCF Bank Stadium; Minneapolis, MN	BTN	L 14–24	32,134
November 24	2:30 p.m.	at Wisconsin	Camp Randall Stadium; Madison, WI (Paul Bunyan's Axe)	ESPN2	W 37–15	74,038
December 26	4:15 p.m.	vs. Georgia Tech*	Ford Field; Detroit, MI (Quick Lane Bowl)	ESPN	W 34–10	27,228
*Non-conference game; ^{†}Homecoming; Rankings from AP Poll released prior to the game; All times are in Central time

== Roster ==
2018 Minnesota Golden Gophers football team roster
Players
Coaches
Offense

Pos.	#	Name	Class
RB	1	Rodney Smith	Sr
QB	2	Tanner Morgan	Fr
WR	3	Chris Autman-Bell	Fr
RB	4	Shannon Brooks	Sr
QB	5	Zack Annexstad	Fr
WR	6	Tyler Johnson	Jr
RB	8	Nolan Edmonds	Fr
WR	11	Jornell Manns	Fr
WR	13	Rashod Bateman	Fr
QB	11	Jon Santaga	Fr
WR	17	Seth Green	So
WR	18	Clay Geary	So
QB	19	Samuel Pickerign	Fr
RB	21	Bryce Williams	Fr
RB	24	Mohamed Ibrahim	Fr
WR	25	Phillip Howard	So
WR	26	True Thompson	So
WR	27	Paul Gossage	Jr
RB	28	Jonathan Femi-Cole	Jr
RB	31	Domink London	Fr
RB	38	Preston Jelen	Fr
TE	42	Ko Kieft	So
TE	44	Colton Beebe	Jr
OL	51	Carlos Dunlap Jr.	Fr
OL	58	Quinn Oseland	Jr
OL	60	John Michael Schmitz	Fr
OL	61	Bronson Dovich	Jr
OL	62	Jared Weyler	Sr
OL	63	Austin Beier	Fr
OL	64	Conner Olson	So
OL	65	Axel Ruschmeyer	Fr
OL	66	Nathan Boe	Fr
OL	70	Sam Schlueter	So
OL	71	Ben Davis	So
OL	73	Donnell Greene	Sr
OL	74	Grant Norton	Fr
OL	75	Kyle Sassack	Fr
OL	76	Jack York	Fr
OL	77	Blaise Andries	Fr
OL	78	Daniel Faalele	Fr
OL	79	Jason Dickson	Jr
TE	80	Jake Paulson	Fr
WR	81	Brock Annexstad	Fr
WR	82	Demetrius Douglas	Fr
WR	83	Harry Van Dyne	Fr
WR	84	Erik Gibson	Fr
TE	85	Bryce Witham	Jr
TE	86	Clayton Witherspoon	Fr
WR	87	Yale Van Dyne	So
TE	88	Brevyn Spann-Ford	Fr
WR	89	Matt Morse	Jr
TE	96	Nathan Bursch	Fr
TE	98	Max Jones	Fr

Defense

Pos.	#	Name	Class
DB	2	Jacob Huff	Sr
DL	3	Jerry Gibson	Sr
DB	4	Terell Smith	Fr
LB	5	Trenton Guthrie	Fr
DB	6	Chris Williamson	Jr
DB	7	Ray Estes	Fr
LB	8	Thomas Rush	Fr
DL	9	Esezi Otomewo	Fr
DB	11	Antoine Winfield Jr.	So
DL	12	Tai'yon Devers	Jr
DB	14	Braelen Oliver	Fr
LB	15	C. J. Smith	Fr
DB	16	Coney Durr	Jr
DL	19	Gary Moore	Sr
LB	20	Julian Huff	Sr
LB	21	Kamal Martin	Jr
DB	22	Benny Sapp III	Fr
DB	23	Jordan Howden	Fr
DB	24	Bishop McDonald (I)	Jr
DB	26	Justus Harris	So
DB	27	Calvin Swenson	So
DB	29	Jack Leius	So
DL	30	Alex Reigelsperger	Fr
DB	31	Kiondre Thomas	So
LB	32	Joe Russell	Fr
DB	34	Antonio Shenault	Sr
LB	35	Danny Anderson	Fr
LB	36	Blake Cashman	Sr
DB	40	Alex Strazzanti	Fr
LB	41	Thomas Barber	Jr
LB	43	Bailey Schoenfelder	So
LB	45	Carter Coughlin	Jr
DL	46	Winston DeLattiboudere	Jr
DB	49	Josh Aune	Fr
DL	52	Jamaal Teague	Fr
LB	53	Owen Piche	Fr
LB	55	Mariano Sori-Marin	Fr
LB	56	Ty Barron	Fr
DL	59	Michael Roane	Fr
DL	67	Jack Kern	Fr
DL	69	Boye Mafe	Fr
DL	75	Malcolm Robinson	Fr
DL	87	Nate Umlor	So
DL	90	Sam Renner	Jr
DL	91	Noah Hickcox	Fr
DL	92	Mayan Ahanotu	Fr
DL	93	Connor Novak-Goar	So
DL	94	Abi N-Okonji	Fr
DL	95	Victor White (I)	So
DL	97	Royal Silver	Jr
DL	99	O.J. Smith	Sr

Special teams

Pos.	#	Name	Class
H	14	Casey O'Brien	Fr
LS	25	Payton Jordahl	Sr
K, P	33	Grant Ryerse	Fr
K	34	Brock Walker	Fr
K	37	John Mack	So
K	38	Emmit Carpenter	Sr
LS	39	Michael Vojvodich	Fr
P	46	Alex Melvin	Jr
P	47	Jacob Herbers	Jr
K	48	Anders Gelecinskyj (I)	So

Head coach

- P. J. Fleck (Head Coach)

Coordinators/assistant coaches

- Kirk Ciarrocca (Offensive Coordinator / Quarterbacks)
- Robb Smith (Defensive Coordinator / Linebackers)
- Rob Wenger (Special Teams Coordinator / Outside Linebackers)
- Jahmile Addae (Defensive Backs)
- Kenni Burns (Running Backs)
- Brian Callahan (Offensive Line)
- Clay Patterson (Tight Ends)
- Joe Rossi (Defensive Line)
- Matt Simon (Wide Receivers)
- Marcus West (Defensive Line Pass Rush Specialist)
- Gerrit Chernoff (General Manager)
- Dan Nichol (Head Strength & Conditioning)
- Norries Wilson (Director of Player Development)

Legend

- (C) Team captain
- (S) Suspended
- (I) Ineligible
- Injured
- Redshirt

Roster
Last update: August 29, 2018

== Game summaries ==
=== New Mexico State ===
	1	2	3	4	Total
Aggies	7	3	0	0	10
Golden Gophers	7	28	3	10	48

=== Fresno State ===
	1	2	3	4	Total
Bulldogs	0	0	7	7	14
Golden Gophers	7	3	0	11	21

=== Miami (OH) ===
	1	2	3	4	Total
RedHawks	0	3	0	0	3
Golden Gophers	7	12	7	0	26

=== At Maryland ===
	1	2	3	4	Total
Golden Gophers	0	10	3	0	13
Terrapins	14	7	14	7	42

=== Iowa ===
	1	2	3	4	Total
Hawkeyes	14	14	10	10	48
Golden Gophers	7	10	7	7	31

=== At Ohio State ===
	1	2	3	4	Total
Golden Gophers	7	7	0	0	14
No. 3 Buckeyes	10	7	3	10	30

=== At Nebraska ===
	1	2	3	4	Total
Golden Gophers	0	8	14	6	28
Cornhuskers	14	14	8	17	53

=== Indiana ===
Indiana Hoosiers (4–4) at Minnesota Golden Gophers (3–4) – Game summary

Quarter	1	2	3	4	Total
Hoosiers	6	3	0	22	31
Golden Gophers	7	14	10	7	38

at TCF Bank Stadium • Minneapolis, Minnesota

- Date: October 26, 2018
- Game time: 7:00 p.m. CST
- Game weather: Rainy, 46 °F (8 °C)
- Game attendance: 33,273
- Referee: Mark Kluczynski
- TV announcers (FS1): Aaron Goldsmith (play-by-play), Evan Moore (analyst)

Game information

First quarter

- (9:27) IU – Logan Justus 33-yard field goal (Drive: 13 plays, 50 yards, 4:45; Indiana 3–0)
- (6:20) MINN – Seth Green 1-yard run, Emmit Carpenter kick (Drive: 7 plays, 65 yards, 3:08; Minnesota 7–3)
- (1:13) IU – Logan Justus 24-yard field goal (Drive: 13 plays, 57 yards, 4:59; Minnesota 7–6)

Second quarter

- (14:05) IU – Logan Justus 41-yard field goal (Drive: 5 plays, 11 yards, 0:33; Indiana 9–7)
- (6:19) MINN – Tyler Johnson 8-yard pass from Tanner Morgan, Emmit Carpenter kick (Drive: 15 plays, 65 yards, 7:44; Minnesota 14–9)
- (0:35) MINN – Tyler Johnson 18-yard pass from Tanner Morgan, Emmit Carpenter kick (Drive: 8 plays, 99 yards, 2:34; Minnesota 21–9)

Third quarter

- (7:56) MINN – Emmit Carpenter 37-yard field goal (Drive: 13 plays, 71 yards, 6:22; Minnesota 24–9)
- (5:33) MINN – Shannon Brooks 17-yard run, Emmit Carpenter kick (Drive: 3 plays, 28 yards, 1:36; Minnesota 31–9)

Fourth quarter

- (13:24) IU – Donavan Hale 43-yard pass from Peyton Ramsey (Drive: 2 plays, 47 yards, 0:32; Minnesota 31–15)
- (10:04) IU – Ty Fryfogle 37-yard pass from Peyton Ramsey, Peyton Ramsey two-point pass to Ty Fryfogle (Drive: 6 plays, 63 yards, 1:50; Minnesota 31–23)
- (3:57) IU – Stevie Scott III 3-yard run, Peyton Ramsey two-point pass to Donavan Hale (Drive: 11 plays, 50 yards, 3:14; Tied 31–31)
- (1:34) MINN – Rashod Bateman 67-yard pass from Tanner Morgan, Emmit Carpenter kick (Drive: 1 play, 67 yards, 0:11; Minnesota 38–31)

Statistics	IU	MINN
First downs	20	22
Total yards	385	482
Rushes/yards	30–153	40–180
Passing yards	232	302
Passing: Comp–Att–Int	29–44–2	17–24–1
Time of possession	29:37	30:23

Team	Category	Player	Statistics
Indiana	Passing	Peyton Ramsey	29/44, 232 yards, 2 TD, 2 INT
Indiana	Rushing	Stevie Scott III	18 carries, 96 yards, TD
Indiana	Receiving	Donavan Hale	4 receptions, 51 yards, TD
Minnesota	Passing	Tanner Morgan	17/24, 302 yards, 3 TD, INT
Minnesota	Rushing	Shannon Brooks	22 carries, 154 yards, TD
Minnesota	Receiving	Rashod Bateman	4 receptions, 108 yards, TD

=== At Illinois ===
	1	2	3	4	Total
Golden Gophers	7	10	0	14	31
Fighting Illini	14	10	21	10	55

=== Purdue ===
	1	2	3	4	Total
Boilermakers	3	0	0	7	10
Golden Gophers	3	10	21	7	41

=== Northwestern ===
	1	2	3	4	Total
Wildcats	7	6	0	11	24
Golden Gophers	0	7	0	7	14

=== At Wisconsin ===
Paul Bunyon's Axe: Minnesota Golden Gophers (5–6) at Wisconsin Badgers (7–4)

Quarter	1	2	3	4	Total
Minnesota	3	14	6	14	37
Wisconsin	0	7	0	8	15

at Camp Randall Stadium • Madison, Wisconsin

- Date: November 24
- Game time: 2:30 p.m.
- Game weather: Cloudy • 42 °F (6 °C) • Wind W 12 miles per hour (19 km/h; 10 kn)
- Game attendance: 74,038
- Referee: R. Snodgrass
- Box Score

Game information

Minnesota

- Tanner Morgan
  9/16, 124 Yds
- Mohamed Ibrahim
  26 Rush, 121 Yds, TD
- Tyler Johnson
  4 Rec, 76 Yds

Wisconsin

- Alex Hornibrook
  22/33, 189 Yds, 2 TD, 3 INT
- Jonathan Taylor
  19 Rush, 120 Yds
- Danny Davis
  10 Rec, 93 Yds

Scoring summary

Quarter	Time	Drive			Team	Scoring information	Score	
Quarter	Time	Plays	Yards	TOP	Team	Scoring information	MINN	WIS
1	2:37	10	65	5:04	Minnesota	34-yard field goal by Emmit Carpenter	3	0
2	2:21	9	59	5:46	Minnesota	Mohamed Ibrahim 10-yard touchdown run, Emmit Carpenter kick good	10	0
2	1:05				Minnesota	Punt returned 69 yards for touchdown by Demetrius Douglas, Emmit Carpenter kick good	17	0
2	0:01	8	76	0:59	Wisconsin	Jake Ferguson 7-yard touchdown reception from Alex Hornibrook, Rafael Gaglianone kick good	17	7
3	7:47	8	51	4:01	Minnesota	23-yard field goal by Emmit Carpenter	20	7
3	1:02	9	31	4:52	Minnesota	42-yard field goal by Emmit Carpenter	23	7
4	4:56	1	23	0:07	Minnesota	Bryce Williams 23-yard touchdown run, Emmit Carpenter kick good	30	7
4	2:31	6	29	2:12	Minnesota	Bryce Williams 16-yard touchdown run, Emmit Carpenter kick good	37	7
4	1:12	7	75	1:19	Wisconsin	Danny Davis 13-yard touchdown reception from Alex Hornibrook, kick good	37	15
"TOP" = time of possession. For other American football terms, see Glossary of American football.							37	15

=== Vs. Georgia Tech (Quick Lane Bowl) ===
	1	2	3	4	Total
Yellow Jackets	0	3	7	0	10
Golden Gophers	10	3	7	14	34

== Awards and honors ==
All-Big Ten
Player	Position	Coaches	Media
Tyler Johnson	WR	2	1
Carter Coughlin	DL	2	2
Blake Cashman	LB	3	2
Jacob Huff	DB	HM	HM
Donnell Greene	OT	HM	HM
Jacob Herbers	P	HM	HM
Emmit Carpenter	K	HM	HM
Demetrius Douglas	PR/KR	–	HM
Blaise Andries	OG	–	HM
Daniel Faalele	OT	–	HM
Mohamed Ibrahim	RB	–	HM
Conner Olson	OG	–	HM
Jared Weyler	C	–	HM
HM = Honorable mention. Reference:

== Players drafted into the NFL ==
Round	Pick	Player	Position	NFL Club
5	157	Blake Cashman	LB	New York Jets
