= Tanner Morgan =

American football player (born 1999)

No. 5
- Position: Quarterback

Personal information
- Born: April 17, 1999 (age 27); Hazard, Kentucky, U.S.
- Listed height: 6 ft 2 in (1.88 m)
- Listed weight: 216 lb (98 kg)

Career information
- High school: Ryle (Union, Kentucky)
- College: Minnesota (2017–2022)
- NFL draft: 2023: undrafted

Career history
- Pittsburgh Steelers (2023)*; Minnesota Vikings (2023)*
- * Offseason or practice squad member only

Awards and highlights
- Second-team All-Big Ten (2019)
- Stats at Pro Football Reference

Tanner Morgan (born April 17, 1999) is an American former professional football quarterback. He played college football for the Minnesota Golden Gophers.

== Early life ==
Morgan was born on April 17, 1999. He originally attended Hazard High School in Hazard, Kentucky, before transferring to Ryle High School in Union, Kentucky prior to his junior year. As a senior, he passed 2,747 yards and 27 touchdowns. He originally committed to Western Michigan University to play college football for head coach P. J. Fleck but recommitted to the University of Minnesota after Fleck joined the school in 2017.

== College career ==
Morgan redshirted his first year at Minnesota in 2017. He entered 2018 as a backup to Zack Annexstad but took over as the starter for the final six games of the season. Overall he played in nine games, completing 89 of 152 passes for 1,401 yards with nine touchdowns and six interceptions.

In 2019, Morgan set several school records including passing yards (3,253) and touchdowns (30). He also set a Big Ten Conference record in a victory over Purdue by completing 21 of 22 passes for a completion percentage of 95.5.

=== Statistics ===
Year	Team	Games			Passing								Rushing			
Year	Team	GP	GS	Record	Cmp	Att	Pct	Yds	Avg	TD	Int	Rtg	Att	Yds	Avg	TD
2017	Minnesota	Redshirted (redshirt)														
2018	Minnesota	9	6	4−2	89	152	58.6	1,401	9.2	9	6	147.6	41	51	1.2	1
2019	Minnesota	13	13	11−2	210	318	66.0	3,253	10.2	30	7	178.7	61	-57	-0.9	1
2020	Minnesota	7	7	3−4	106	183	57.9	1,374	7.5	7	5	128.2	25	-35	-1.4	0
2021	Minnesota	13	13	9−4	149	250	59.6	2,044	8.2	10	9	134.3	59	-9	-0.2	2
2022	Minnesota	6	6	4−2	83	124	66.9	1,164	9.4	7	5	156.4	24	74	3.1	4
Career		48	45	31−14	637	1,027	62.0	9,236	9.0	63	32	151.6	210	24	0.1	8

== Professional career ==
Pre-draft measurables
Height	Weight	Arm length	Hand span	40-yard dash	10-yard split	20-yard split	20-yard shuttle	Three-cone drill	Vertical jump	Broad jump
6 ft 0 3/8 in (1.84 m)	204 lb (93 kg)	29 7/8 in (0.76 m)	9 1/2 in (0.24 m)	4.97 s	1.72 s	2.75 s	4.45 s	7.23 s	30.0 in (0.76 m)	9 ft 8 in (2.95 m)
All values from Minnesota's Pro Day

=== Pittsburgh Steelers ===
Morgan was selected by the Michigan Panthers with the eighth overall pick in the 2023 USFL draft, but he chose not to join the Panthers, hoping to be selected in the 2023 NFL draft instead. He was not selected, but signed with the Pittsburgh Steelers as an undrafted free agent immediately after the draft's conclusion. He was waived on August 28, 2023.

=== Minnesota Vikings ===
On October 5, 2023, Morgan was signed to the Minnesota Vikings practice squad, but was released five days later. He was re-signed to the practice squad once again on November 8, and released two days later.

== Coaching career ==
On September 18, 2023, Morgan returned to the University of Minnesota as an offensive analyst on P. J. Fleck's staff following his release from the Steelers. He would vacate the role in October after signing a contract with the Minnesota Vikings.

== Personal life ==
Morgan is a Christian. His father, Ted, died from a brain tumor in July 2021.
