= Mohamed Ibrahim (American football) =

American football player and coach (born 1998)

Current position
- Title: Running backs coach
- Team: Minnesota
- Conference: Big Ten

Biographical details
- Born: September 8, 1998 (age 28); Baltimore, Maryland, U.S.

Playing career
- 2017–2022: Minnesota
- 2023: Detroit Lions
- 2024: Minnesota Vikings*
- Position: Running back

Coaching career (HC unless noted)
- 2025: Kent State (RB)
- 2026–present: Minnesota (RB)

Accomplishments and honors

Awards
- As a player: Third-team All-American (2020); Big Ten Running Back of the Year (2020); 2× First-team All-Big Ten (2020, 2022)

Mohamed Ibrahim (/'aɪbrəhiːm/ EYE-brə-heem; born September 8, 1998) is an American college football coach and former player. He is currently the running backs coach for the Minnesota Golden Gophers. He played college football for Minnesota and for the Detroit Lions of the National Football League.

== Early life ==
Ibrahim was born and grew up in Baltimore, Maryland, and attended Our Lady of Good Counsel High School in Olney, Maryland. As a senior, he rushed for 1,313 yards and 16 touchdowns on 206 attempts. He committed to play college football at Minnesota over offers from Kentucky, Iowa, Temple, and Towson.

== College career ==
Ibrahim redshirted his true freshman season. He became the Golden Gophers' starting running back as a redshirt freshman and rushed 202 times for 1,160 yards, the second most by a freshman in history behind Darrell Thompson, and nine touchdowns. Ibrahim was named the MVP of the 2018 Quick Lane Bowl after rushing for 224 yards and two touchdowns against Georgia Tech. As a redshirt sophomore he gained 604 yards and scored seven touchdowns on 114 carries. He entered his redshirt junior season on the watchlist for the Doak Walker Award. Ibrahim finished the season with 1,076 and 15 touchdowns on 201 carries in seven games played and was named first team All-Big Ten and the Ameche–Dayne Running Back of the Year as well as a third team All-American by the Associated Press.

=== Statistics ===
Year	Team	Games		Rushing				Receiving			
Year	Team	GP	GS	Att	Yards	Avg	TD	Rec	Yards	Avg	TD
2017	Minnesota	Redshirt (redshirt)									
2018	Minnesota	10	9	202	1,160	5.7	9	4	26	6.5	0
2019	Minnesota	11	0	114	604	5.3	7	3	13	4.3	0
2020	Minnesota	7	7	201	1,076	5.4	15	8	56	7.0	0
2021	Minnesota	1	1	30	163	5.4	2	0	0	0.0	0
2022	Minnesota	12	12	320	1,665	5.2	20	7	50	7.1	0
Career		37	29	867	4,668	5.4	53	22	145	6.6	0

== Professional career ==
Pre-draft measurables
Height	Weight	Arm length	Hand span
5 ft 7 3/4 in (1.72 m)	203 lb (92 kg)	28 5/8 in (0.73 m)	9 in (0.23 m)
All values from the NFL Combine

=== Detroit Lions ===
Although Ibrahim was not selected during the 2023 NFL draft, he signed with the Detroit Lions as an undrafted free agent immediately after the draft's conclusion. He was waived/injured on August 20, 2023, and placed on injured reserve. He was released six days later with an injury settlement. He was re-signed to the practice squad on October 17. He was elevated to the active roster ahead of a road game against the Baltimore Ravens on October 22. While being tackled during a kickoff return in the third quarter, he suffered a hip injury (later revealed to be a dislocation) and had to be carted off the field. The Lions placed him on the practice squad/injured list two days later. He was not signed to a reserve/future contract after the season and thus became a free agent when his practice squad contract expired.

=== Minnesota Vikings ===
Ibrahim signed with the Minnesota Vikings on August 22, 2024, but was waived four days later.

== Coaching career ==
In 2025, Ibrahim was hired to be the running backs coach at Kent State. Kent State head coach Kenni Burns had been Ibrahim's position coach at Minnesota for Ibrahim's entire college career. After one season, he was hired as the running backs coach at Minnesota.

== Personal life ==
Ibrahim is a practicing Muslim. His father, also named Mohamed, immigrated to the United States from Nigeria, while his mother, Latoya, is a native of Minnesota.
