= Tyrone Broden =

American football player (born 2001)

Tyrone Broden Jr.
Profile
- Position: Cornerback

Personal information
- Born: February 26, 2001 (age 25); Detroit, Michigan, U.S.
- Listed height: 6 ft 5 in (1.96 m)
- Listed weight: 194 lb (88 kg)

Career information
- High school: West Bloomfield (West Bloomfield, Michigan)
- College: Bowling Green (2019–2022); Arkansas (2023–2024)
- NFL draft: 2025: undrafted

Career history
- Seattle Seahawks (2025)*
- * Offseason or practice squad member only

Awards and highlights
- Super Bowl champion (LX)
- Stats at Pro Football Reference

Tyrone Broden Jr. (born February 26, 2001) is an American professional football cornerback. He played college football for the Bowling Green Falcons and Arkansas Razorbacks.

He was signed by the Seahawks after going undrafted in the 2025 NFL draft. Broden was initially a wide receiver before converting to cornerback.

== Early life ==
Tyrone Broden was born on February 26, 2001, in Detroit, Michigan. He attended West Bloomfield High School where he helped lead them to a 9–3 winning record, earning himself Oakland Activities Association Red All-League Honors and was named a Detroit News All-North Football Team honorable mention. Broden was rated a three-star prospect and committed to play college football at Bowling Green over schools including Indiana, Purdue, Syracuse, and a plethora of MAC schools. He did this because of its proximity to his hometown, being only about an hour and a half away by car. Also, Erik Campbell, the coach who recruited Broden, had previously coached West Bloomfield's head coach at Michigan in the 1990s.

== College career ==
=== Bowling Green ===
In 2019, Broden played in three games and redshirted. He started all five games in the COVID-19-shortened season in 2020. In 2023, he started nine games and played in 11. He also had 596 receiving yards that season, a career high.

During his final season at Bowling Green in 2022, he started seven games and appeared in all of them. He had 506 yards receiving and seven touchdowns, the latter of which is a career high.

On January 1, 2023, he entered the NCAA transfer portal. He transferred to Arkansas over his two other finalists, Penn State and Oklahoma.

=== Arkansas ===
In his first season at Arkansas, Broden started four games and had 109 yards receiving and three touchdowns, the latter marking his high for the Razorbacks.

In his second and final season in 2024, he started nine games and played in all 13. His high for receiving yards with Arkansas was this year, with 197.

== Professional career ==
Pre-draft measurables
Height	Weight	Arm length	Hand span	Wingspan	40-yard dash	10-yard split	20-yard split	20-yard shuttle	Three-cone drill	Vertical jump	Broad jump
6 ft 5 1/8 in (1.96 m)	194 lb (88 kg)	33 1/4 in (0.84 m)	9 1/2 in (0.24 m)	6 ft 6 1/4 in (1.99 m)	4.37 s	1.51 s	2.45 s	4.40 s	7.07 s	35.0 in (0.89 m)	11 ft 4 in (3.45 m)
All values from Pro Day

After going undrafted in the 2025 NFL draft, Broden was signed by the Seattle Seahawks. On May 2, 2025, he signed a three-year, $2.98 million contract with the Seahawks. Broden was waived by Seattle on August 26, then was re-signed to the team's practice squad the following day. He was again waived by the Seahawks on October 14, and was later re-signed on October 24.

On February 12, 2026, Broden signed a reserve/futures contract with the Seahawks. He converted to cornerback ahead of the 2026 season. On July 24, Broden was waived by the Seahawks.

== Personal life ==
He was born to Tyrone Broden Sr. and Felicia Streater. As a child, he had a stutter. He has two siblings: Tylicia and Tajanea Broden. Two brothers, Derrick Streater and Darryl Burks, both died during Broden’s time at Arkansas. Streater died in a car accident in July 2023, and Burks died by suicide nine months later in April 2024.
