= Quick Lane =

Global automotive chain

Coordinates: 42.30033°N 83.26564°W

Quick Lane Tire & Auto Center

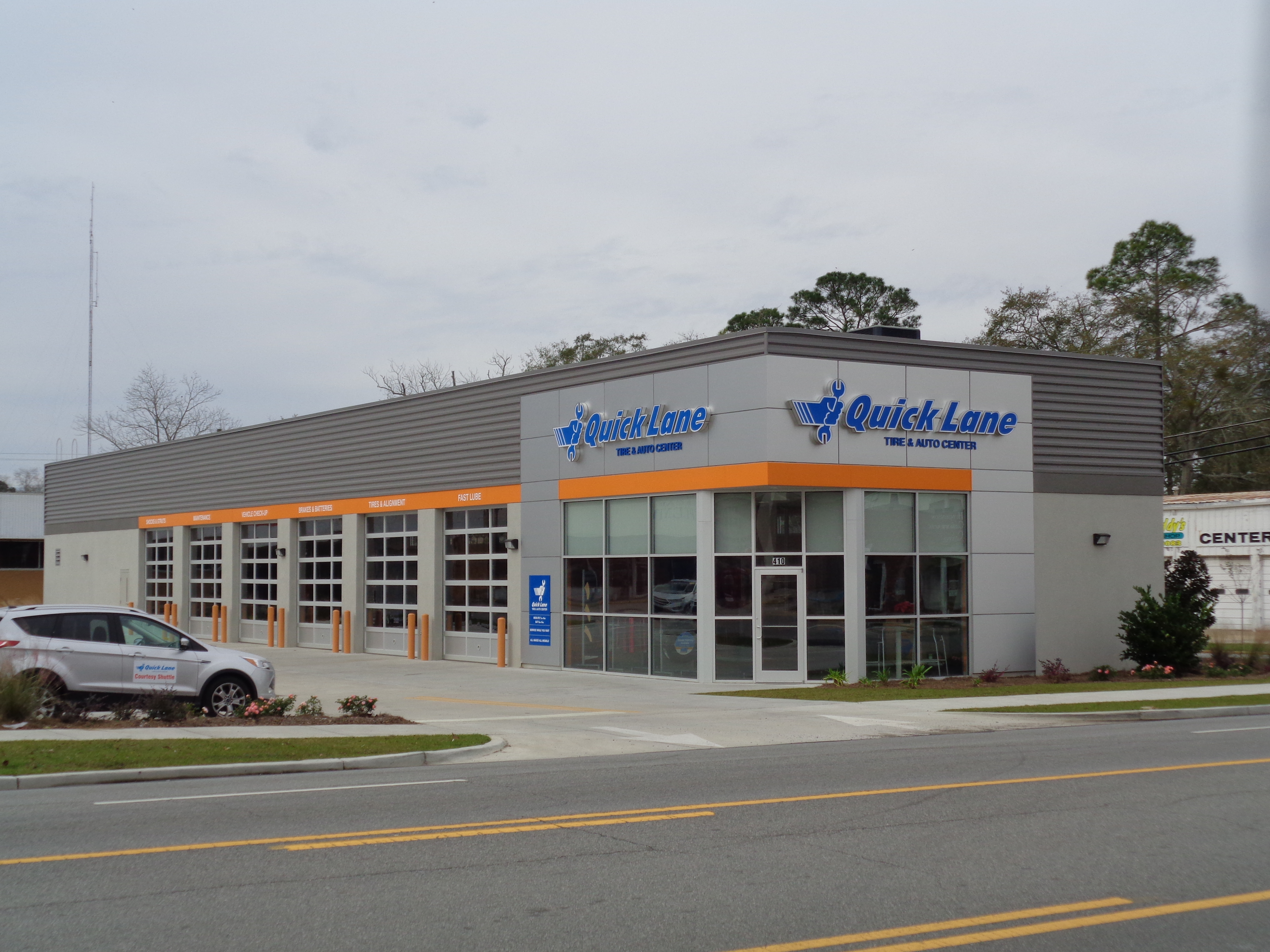
- Quick Lane center in Valdosta, Georgia, 2016
- Type: Division
- Industry: Automotive services
- Founded: 1997; 29 years ago Dearborn Michigan, U.S.
- Headquarters: Dearborn, Michigan, U.S.
- Number of locations: 825
- Area served: Nationwide
- Products: Oil; Motorcraft parts; Omnicraft parts; Tires
- Services: Oil change; Light automotive services and repair
- Parent: Ford Motor Company
- Website: quicklane.com

Quick Lane Tire and Auto Center is a global automotive chain that provides oil changes, tire rotation, multi-point inspections and other express services. Currently headquartered in Dearborn, Michigan, Quick Lane is owned by Ford Motor Company; there are 825 locations as of February 2018. Some stores are stand-alone operations and some are attached to a dealership. Quick Lane is designed for dealers to pick up additional work to replace decreased warranty work. Quick Lane offers routine vehicle auto services including oil and filter changes, light repair services such as brake repairs and tire replacement.

== History ==
Quick Lane was launched as a pilot program in 1997 by Ford Motor Company. 80 shops were opened in 2003, boosting locations to 279. In August 2014, Ford and the Detroit Lions announced that Quick Lane would become title sponsor of the Quick Lane Bowl, succeeding the Little Caesars Pizza Bowl as the annual bowl game based in Detroit. That sponsorship lasted until June 2024.

In January 2017, Ford had launched it Omnicraft parts for non-Ford and non-Lincoln vehicles. Quick Lane franchisees thus would not have to order those parts from other distribution outlets thus increasing ordering efficiency and potential decreasing costs. In February 2018, Changan Ford Automobile opened two locations in China, which are the first two company owned locations.

== Sponsorships ==
Quick Lane began sponsoring the Quick Lane Bowl begin in 2014 for a three year period. In November 2016, Quick Lane extended its sponsorship of the Detroit Lions' bowl for another three years to 2019.

Quick Lane was a sponsor of the Wood Brothers No. 21 Motorcraft/Quick Lane Ford Fusion driven by Ryan Blaney in the 2017 Monster Energy NASCAR Cup Series. In 2018, Paul Menard became the new driver of the No. 21 car, Quick Lane still sponsoring during the season.
