= 2022 Arizona Bowl =

Postseason college football bowl game

2022 Barstool Sports Arizona Bowl
- 7th Arizona Bowl
Ohio Bobcats	Wyoming Cowboys
(9–4)	(7–5)
MAC	Mountain West
30	27
Head coach: Tim Albin	Head coach: Craig Bohl
	1	2	3	4	OT	Total
Ohio	8	3	7	6	6	30
Wyoming	14	3	0	7	3	27
- Date: December 30, 2022
- Season: 2022
- Stadium: Arizona Stadium
- Location: Tucson, Arizona
- MVP: CJ Harris (QB, Ohio)
- Favorite: Ohio by 3
- National anthem: Dan Katz
- Referee: Jeremy Parker (Sun Belt)
- Attendance: 27,691
- Payout: US$350,000

United States TV coverage
- Network: Barstool.TV
- Announcers: Jake Marsh (play-by-play); Dan Katz and Dave Portnoy (analysts); Caleb Pressley and Adam Ferrone (sideline reporters)

The 2022 Arizona Bowl was a college football bowl game played on December 30, 2022, at Arizona Stadium in Tucson, Arizona. The seventh annual Arizona Bowl, the game featured Ohio from the Mid-American Conference and Wyoming from the Mountain West Conference. The game began at 2:40 p.m. MST and was aired on Barstool Sports's website and social media. Ohio defeated Wyoming in overtime 30–27. Ohio's quarterback CJ Harris was named the most valuable player. It was one of the 2022–23 bowl games concluding the 2022 FBS football season. Barstool Sports was also the game's title sponsor.

== Teams ==
Consistent with conference tie-ins, the game featured teams from the Mid-American Conference (MAC) and the Mountain West Conference. This was the third meeting between Ohio and Wyoming; the Cowboys had won both previous meetings.

=== Ohio ===
Ohio played to a 9–3 regular season record (7–1 in conference). After losing three of their first five games, they won seven games in a row. The Bobcats qualified for the MAC Championship Game, which they lost to Toledo, and entered the Arizona Bowl with an overall record of 9–4.

=== Wyoming ===
Wyoming played to a 7–5 regular-season record, 5–3 in conference play. Their season included three-game and four-game winning streaks, but they closed with back-to-back losses. The Cowboys faced, and lost to, one ranked opponent, BYU.

== Game summary ==
2022 Barstool Sports Arizona Bowl

Quarter	1	2	3	4	OT	Total
Ohio	8	3	7	6	6	30
Wyoming	14	3	0	7	3	27

at Arizona Stadium • Tucson, Arizona

- Date: Friday, December 30, 2022
- Game time: 2:30 p.m. MST
- Game weather: Cloudy • Temperature: 60 °F (16 °C)
- Game attendance: 27,691
- Referee: Jeremy Parker
- TV announcers (Barstool Sports): Jake Marsh, Dan Katz, Dave Portnoy, Caleb Pressley, and Adam Ferrone
- Box score

Game information

First Quarter

- (10:12) UW - Vaughn, Jordon 17 yd run (Hoyland, John kick) 9 plays, 70 yards, TOP 04:42 (UW 7–0)
- (08:23) OHIO - Jones, Jacoby 34 yd pass from Harris, CJ (Holloway, Justin pass) 5 plays, 58 yards, TOP 01:40 (OHIO 8–7)
- (03:58) UW - Welch, Treyton 17 yd pass from Peasley, Andrew (Hoyland, John kick) 1 plays, 17 yards, TOP 00:07 (UW 14–8)

Second Quarter

- (13:28) OHIO - Vakos, Nathanial 43 yd field goal 12 plays, 49 yards, TOP 05:30 (UW 14–11)
- (00:04) UW - Hoyland, John 53 yd field goal 8 plays, 30 yards, TOP 01:07 (UW 17–11)

Third Quarter

- (05:14) OHIO - Bangura, Sieh 3 yd run (Vakos, Nathanial kick) 4 plays, 56 yards, TOP 02:07 (OHIO 18–17)

Fourth Quarter

- (04:17) OHIO - Vakos, Nathanial 45 yd field goal 7 plays, 38 yards, TOP 04:03 (OHIO 21–17)
- (02:08) UW - Vaughn, Jordon 5 yd run (Hoyland, John kick) 6 plays, 75 yards, TOP 02:09 (UW 24–21)
- (00:04) OHIO - Vakos, Nathanial 46 yd field goal 10 plays, 55 yards, TOP 01:59 (Tied 24–27)

Overtime

- (00:00) UW - Hoyland, John 29 yd field goal 5 plays, 14 yards, TOP 00:00 (UW 27–24)
- (00:00) OHIO - Foster, Tyler 10 yd pass from Harris, CJ ( ) 5 plays, 25 yards, TOP 00:00 (OHIO 30–27)

== Statistics ==
Team statistical comparison
Statistic	Ohio	Wyoming
First downs	22	17
First downs rushing	11	7
First downs passing	9	9
First downs penalty	2	1
Third down efficiency	7–15	7–16
Fourth down efficiency	0–0	0–0
Total plays–net yards	72–385	63–291
Rushing attempts–net yards	38–201	33–105
Yards per rush	5.3	3.2
Yards passing	184	186
Pass completions–attempts	20–34	18–30
Interceptions thrown	0	1
Punt returns–total yards	3–5	0–0
Kickoff returns–total yards	4–95	3–51
Punts–average yardage	5–38.2	7–41.7
Fumbles–lost	2–1	0–0
Penalties–yards	4–43	3–28
Time of possession	30:49	29:11

Ohio statistics
Bobcats passing
	C–A	Yds	TD–INT
CJ Harris	20–33	184	2–0
Jacoby Jones	0–1	0	0–0
Bobcats rushing
	Car	Yds	TD
Sieh Bangura	25	138	1
CJ Harris	10	52	0
Nolan McCormick	2	6	0
Jacoby Jones	1	5	0
Bobcats receiving
	Rec	Yds	TD
Jacoby Jones	3	44	1
Miles Cross	4	39	0
Sam Wiglusz	4	27	0
Alec Burton	2	26	0
Sieh Bangura	4	18	0
James Bostic	1	15	0
Tyler Foster	1	10	1
Will Kacmarek	1	5	0

Wyoming statistics
Cowboys passing
	C–A	Yds	TD–INT
Andrew Peasley	18–30	186	1–1
Cowboys rushing
	Car	Yds	TD
Jordon Vaughn	16	67	2
Sam Scott	3	11	0
Jayden Clemons	2	10	0
Andrew Peasley	11	9	0
Ryan Marquez	1	8	0
Cowboys receiving
	Rec	Yds	TD
Treyton Welch	5	91	1
Ryan Marquez	4	38	0
Alex Brown	3	28	0
Jaylen Sargent	2	2	
Wyatt Wieland	2	10	0
Caleb Merritt	1	6	0
Caleb Driskill	1	1	0
