= 2022 Ohio Bobcats football team =

American college football season

2022 Ohio Bobcats football

MAC East Division champion Arizona Bowl champion

MAC Championship, L 7–17 vs. Toledo

Arizona Bowl, W 30–27 ^{OT}vs. Wyoming
- Conference: Mid-American Conference
- East Division
- Record: 10–4 (7–1 MAC)
- Head coach: Tim Albin (2nd season)
- Co-offensive coordinators: Scott Isphording (2nd season); Allen Rudolph (2nd season)
- Offensive scheme: Spread option
- Defensive coordinator: Spence Nowinsky (1st season)
- Base defense: 4–2–5
- Captains: Kai Caesar; Bryce Houston; Kurtis Rourke
- Home stadium: Peden Stadium

2022 Mid-American Conference football standings
	Conf.			Overall
Team	W		L	W		L
East Division
Ohio xy	7	–	1	10	–	4
Buffalo	5	–	3	7	–	6
Bowling Green	5	–	3	6	–	7
Miami (OH)	4	–	4	6	–	7
Kent State	4	–	4	5	–	7
Akron	1	–	7	2	–	10
West Division
Toledo xy$	5	–	3	9	–	5
Eastern Michigan x	5	–	3	9	–	4
Western Michigan	4	–	4	5	–	7
Ball State	3	–	5	5	–	7
Central Michigan	3	–	5	4	–	8
Northern Illinois	2	–	6	3	–	9
Championship: Toledo 17, Ohio 7
$ – Conference champion; x – Division champion/co-champions; y – Championship game participant; Rankings from AP Poll

The 2022 Ohio Bobcats football team represented Ohio University as a member of the East Division of the Mid-American Conference (MAC) in the 2022 NCAA Division I FBS football season. They were led by second-year head coach Tim Albin and played their home games at Peden Stadium in Athens, Ohio. They finished the season 10–4 and 7–1 in the MAC and won the MAC East for the first time since 2016. They lost to Toledo in the MAC Championship Game. Ohio defeated Wyoming in the Arizona Bowl

Ohio entered the 2022 season with coming off of their worst season since 2003 and was predicted to finish near the bottom of the MAC East. The Bobcats finished their non-conference schedule 2–2 with high-scoring home wins 41–38 over Florida Atlantic and 59–52 over FCS Fordham and with losses at power conference foes Penn State and Iowa State. They opened conference play with an overtime loss to media preseason MAC East favorite Kent State where they surrendered 736 offensive yards to the Golden Flashes. After a 55–34 win over MAC cellar dweller Akron in which Akron passed for 418 yards, the Bobcats got back to .500 on the season with a 3–3 record and 1–1 mark in the conference. While Ohio's offense was prolific and the passing attack was setting records behind MAC Player of the year quarterback Kurtis Rourke, who had 537 yards against Fordham, Ohio's defense was struggling mightily. Through six games Ohio was surrendering 40.6 points, 561 yards, and 387 passing yards per game. However, the Akron win was the beginning of a second half winning streak during which the defense would turn things around dramatically.

In the seventh game Ohio notched their second MAC win and first road win of the season with a 33–14 win over Western Michigan. Ohio's defense gave up only 14 points while forcing 6 turnovers, 5 of which were interceptions, and getting 5 sacks. Ohio defeated Northern Illinois with Rourke only passing for 200 yards. The defense led the way holding the Huskies to 17 points. In a home game against Buffalo for control of the MAC East, Rourke threw a school record tying 5 touchdown passes in an easy 45–24 win. The Bulls were held to 260 total yards on the game.

Ohio went on the road for wins over rival Miami (OH) and Ball State. Rourke threw tor 362 yards and 3 touchdowns against the RedHawks but suffered a season ending torn ACL against the Cardinals. Ohio was forced to rely on its running game and defense. The Bobcats ran for 224 yards with 148 and two touchdowns coming from MAC Freshman of the Year Sieh Bangura. Ohio's defense forced three turnovers and held the Cardinals to 18 points. With Rourke and Parker Navarro out for the season Ohio turned to CJ Harris at quarterback to wrap up the division against Bowling Green. Harris led the Bobcats to a 38–14 win. Again, it was the running game and defense that led the way as the Falcons were held to 279 yards of offense. Prior to the season the university installed new turf in Peden Stadium. The field at Peden was christened "Frank Solich Field" after the MAC's all-time coaching wins leader to whom Albin was a long time assistant. With the win over Bowling Green, Ohio remained unbeaten on the new field. After the regular season Albin was named MAC Coach of the Year after bringing the Bobcats back from their first losing season in 13 years after he took over the program on short notice following the unexpected retirement of Solich prior to the 2021 season. In spite of missing the last three and a half games of the season Kurtis Rourke became Ohio's first winner of the Vern Smith Leadership Award for MAC Player of the Year which has been given out since 1982.

Ohio's offense struggled without Rourke in 17–7 championship loss to Toledo. The Bobcats rebounded to win the Arizona Bowl 30–27 in overtime over Wyoming where Harris was named the MVP

== Offseason ==
Positions key
Offense	Defense	Special teams
QB — Quarterback; RB — Running back; FB — Fullback; WR — Wide receiver; TE — Tight end; OL — Offensive lineman; T — Tackle; G — Guard; C — Center	DL — Defensive lineman; DT — Defensive tackle (Note: Includes nose tackle (NT)); DE — Defensive end; EDGE — Edge rusher; LB — Linebacker (Note: Includes middle linebacker (MLB/MIKE), weakside linebacker (WILL), strongside linebacker (SAM), off-ball linebacker, and outside linebacker (OLB)); DB — Defensive back; CB — Cornerback; S — Safety (Note: Includes free safety (FS) and strong safety (SS))	K — Kicker (Note: Also known as a placekicker (PK)); P — Punter; LS — Long snapper; RS — Return specialist (Note: Includes kickoff and punt returners)

=== Transfers ===
==== Outgoing ====
Player	Position	Destination
Shakari Denson	ATH	Alabama A&M
Jerome Buckner	WR	Illinois State
Jett Elad	S	
Bryce McNair	T	Southern
Pierre Kemeni	CB	Texas State
Tillman Weaver	DL	
Isiah Cox	WR	Alabama A&M
Walter Wilbon III	WR	Iowa Central Community College
Samson Jackson	T	Alabama A&M
Wyatt Walton	OL	
Gary Hoover	T	Old Dominion
Cedric Hillsman	DL	

==== Incoming ====
Player	Position	Transferred From
Parker Navarro	QB	UCF
August Pitre	WR	Rice
Dontay Hunter II	DL	Purdue
Sam Wiglusz	WR	Ohio State

=== Recruiting ===
College recruiting (2022)
Name	Hometown	School	Height	Weight	Commit date
Rodney Harris II; WR	Cincinnati, Ohio	Princeton	6 ft 3 in (1.91 m)	195 lb (88 kg)	
Rodney Harris II; WR	Recruit ratings: 247Sports:				
Dontierre Fisher; RB	Checotah, Oklahoma	Checotah	5 ft 9 in (1.75 m)	185 lb (84 kg)	
Dontierre Fisher; RB	Recruit ratings: 247Sports:				
Callum Wither; QB	Mississauga, Ontario	Clarkson Football North	6 ft 4 in (1.93 m)	210 lb (95 kg)	
Callum Wither; QB	Recruit ratings: 247Sports:				
Mekah Ryder; CB	McKinney, Texas	McKinney	6 ft 1 in (1.85 m)	165 lb (75 kg)	
Mekah Ryder; CB	Recruit ratings: 247Sports:				
Rayyan Buell; CB	Senatobia, Mississippi	Northwest Mississippi C.C	6 ft 2 in (1.88 m)	280 lb (130 kg)	
Rayyan Buell; CB	Recruit ratings: No ratings found				
Jacoby Jones; WR	Senatobia, Mississippi	Northwest Mississippi C.C	6 ft 2 in (1.88 m)	200 lb (91 kg)	
Jacoby Jones; WR	Recruit ratings: No ratings found				
Cam McCullum; CB	Scooba, Mississippi	East Mississippi C.C.	5 ft 11 in (1.80 m)	180 lb (82 kg)	
Cam McCullum; CB	Recruit ratings: No ratings found				
Tyler Mullins; S	Scooba, Mississippi	Coffeyville C.C.	5 ft 11 in (1.80 m)	175 lb (79 kg)	
Tyler Mullins; S	Recruit ratings: No ratings found				
Nathaniel Vakos; K	Avon, Ohio	Avon	6 ft 1 in (1.85 m)	195 lb (88 kg)	
Nathaniel Vakos; K	Recruit ratings: No ratings found				
Vance van Every; OL	Senatobia, Mississippi	Northwest Mississippi C.C.	6 ft 2 in (1.88 m)	285 lb (129 kg)	
Vance van Every; OL	Recruit ratings: No ratings found				
Jarian Shelby; OL	Boutte, Louisiana	Hahnville	6 ft 3 in (1.91 m)	295 lb (134 kg)	
Jarian Shelby; OL	Recruit ratings: No ratings found				
Cedric Hillsman; DL	Booneville, Mississippi	Northeast Mississippi C.C.	6 ft 1 in (1.85 m)	265 lb (120 kg)	
Cedric Hillsman; DL	Recruit ratings: 247Sports:				
Overall recruit ranking:
Note: In many cases, Scout, Rivals, 247Sports, On3, and ESPN may conflict in their listings of height and weight.; In these cases, the average was taken. ESPN grades are on a 100-point scale.; Sources:

== Preseason ==
=== Preseason polls ===
==== Media Poll ====
On July 26 the MAC announced the preseason media poll. Ohio was picked to finish fourth in the East and received no votes to win conference.

East
Predicted finish	Team	Votes (1st place)
1	Miami (OH)	139 (20)
2	Kent State	116 (3)
3	Buffalo	78
4	Ohio	72
5	Bowling Green	71 (1)
6	Akron	28

West
Predicted finish	Team	Votes (1st place)
1	Northern Illinois	122 (11)
2	Toledo	120 (9)
3	Central Michigan	112 (4)
4	Western Michigan	56
5	Eastern Michigan	52
6	Ball State	42

Media poll (MAC Championship)
Rank	Team	Votes
1	Northern Illinois	9
2	Toledo	6
3	Miami (OH)	5
3	Central Michigan	4

==== Coaches Poll ====
On August 29 the MAC released the coaches poll. Ohio was selected fifth the East.

East
Predicted finish	Team	Votes (1st place)
1	Kent State	61 (5)
2	Miami (OH)	60 (6)
3	Buffalo	43
4	Bowling Green	36 (1)
5	Ohio	35
6	Akron	16

West
Predicted finish	Team	Votes (1st place)
1	Northern Illinois	61 (6)
2	Toledo	51
3	Central Michigan	50 (2)
4	Western Michigan	45 (3)
5	Eastern Michigan	24
6	Ball State	21 (1)

Coaches poll (MAC Championship)
Rank	Team	Votes
1	Northern Illinois	4
2	Kent State	3
3	Miami (OH)	2
3	Western Michigan	2
5	Ball State	1

=== Award watch lists ===
Award	Player	Position	Year
Johnny Unitas Golden Arm Award	Kurtis Rourke	QB	Jr.

== Schedule ==
Date	Time	Opponent	Site	TV	Result	Attendance
September 3	6:00 p.m.	Florida Atlantic*	Peden Stadium; Athens, OH	ESPN+	W 41–38	20,003
September 10	12:00 p.m.	at Penn State*	Beaver Stadium; State College, PA	ABC	L 10–46	107,306
September 17	2:00 p.m.	at Iowa State*	Jack Trice Stadium; Ames, IA	ESPN+	L 10–43	58,138
September 24	2:00 p.m.	Fordham*	Peden Stadium; Athens, OH	ESPN+	W 59–52	19,024
October 1	3:30 p.m.	at Kent State	Dix Stadium; Kent, OH	ESPN+	L 24–31 ^{OT}	20,392
October 8	2:00 p.m.	Akron^{†}	Peden Stadium; Athens, OH	ESPN3	W 55–34	23,108
October 15	3:30 p.m.	at Western Michigan	Waldo Stadium; Kalamazoo, MI	CBSSN	W 33–14	20,320
October 22	2:00 p.m.	Northern Illinois	Peden Stadium; Athens, OH	ESPN+	W 24–17	15,922
November 1	7:30 p.m.	Buffalo	Peden Stadium; Athens, OH	ESPN2	W 45–24	16,401
November 8	7:30 p.m.	at Miami (OH)	Yager Stadium; Oxford, OH (Battle of the Bricks)	ESPN2	W 37–21	15,490
November 15	7:00 p.m.	at Ball State	Scheumann Stadium; Muncie, IN	ESPN2	W 32–18	6,722
November 22	7:00 p.m.	Bowling Green	Peden Stadium; Athens, OH	ESPNU	W 38–14	11,693
December 3	12:00 p.m.	vs. Toledo	Ford Field; Detroit, MI (MAC Championship Game)	ESPN	L 7–17	15,550
December 30	4:30 p.m.	vs. Wyoming*	Arizona Stadium; Tucson, AZ (Arizona Bowl)	Barstool TV	W 30–27^{OT}	27,691
*Non-conference game; ^{†}Homecoming; Rankings from AP Poll released prior to the game; All times are in Eastern time

== Game summaries ==
=== Vs. Florida Atlantic ===
Florida Atlantic Owls (1–0) vs. Ohio Bobcats (0–0)

Quarter	1	2	3	4	Total
Florida Atlantic	10	7	0	21	38
Ohio	3	10	14	14	41

at Peden Stadium • Athens, OH

- Date: Saturday, September 3, 2022
- Game time: 6:00 p.m. EDT
- Game weather: sunny, Temperature:75 °F (24 °C)
- Game attendance: 20,003
- Referee: Tom Stapleton
- TV announcers (ESPN+): Anthony Lima, Je'Rod Cherry
- box score, Ohio notes

Game information

First Quarter

- (11:10) FAU – Burton, Je'Quan 20 yd pass from Perry, N'Kosi (Suarez, Morgan kick) 10 plays, 75 yards, TOP 03:50 (FAU 7–0)
- (07:00) OHIO – Vakos, Nathanial 29 yd field goal 4 plays, yards, TOP 01:43 (FAU 7–3)
- (02:50) FAU – Suarez, Morgan 24 yd field goal 11 plays, 68 yards, TOP 04:10 (FAU 10–3)

Second Quarter

- (14:13) OHIO – Wiglusz, Sam 6 yd pass from Rourke, Kurtis (Vakos, Nathanial kick) 9 plays, 75 yards, TOP 03:37 (Tied 10–10)
- (10:38) FAU – Edrine, Jahmal 16 yd pass from Perry, N'Kosi (Suarez, Morgan kick) 11 plays, 73 yards, TOP 03:35 (FAU 17–10)
- (01:24) OHIO – Vakos, Nathanial 36 yd field goal 9 plays, 66 yards, TOP 03:25 (FAU 17–13)

Third Quarter

- (10:33) OHIO – Wiglusz, Sam 5 yd pass from Rourke, Kurtis (Vakos, Nathanial kick) 11 plays, 87 yards, TOP 04:21 (OHIO 20–17)
- (04:24) OHIO – Cross, Miles 1 yd pass from Rourke, Kurtis (Vakos, Nathanial kick) 9 plays, 78 yards, TOP 04:19 (OHIO 27–17)

Fourth Quarter

- (12:20) OHIO – Rourke, Kurtis 2 yd run (Vakos, Nathanial kick) 4 plays, 29 yards, TOP 01:37 (OHIO 34–17)
- (10:22) FAU – Johnson, Tony 9 yd pass from Perry, N'Kosi (Suarez, Morgan kick) 8 plays, 75 yards, TOP 01:58 (OHIO 34–24)
- (07:10) OHIO – Bostic, James 15 yd pass from Rourke, Kurtis (Vakos, Nathanial kick) 5 plays, 83 yards, TOP 03:08 (OHIO 41–24)
- (06:09) FAU – Edrine, Jahmal 7 yd pass from Perry, N'Kosi (Suarez, Morgan kick) 3 plays, 75 yards, TOP 01:01 (OHIO 41–31)
- (04:09) FAU – Wester, LaJohntay 7 yd pass from Perry, N'Kosi (Suarez, Morgan kick) 1 plays, 7 yards, TOP 00:06 (OHIO 41–38)

Statistics	FAU	OHIO
First downs	25	26
Total yards	478	476
Rushes/yards	29/114	39/131
Passing yards	364	345
Passing: Comp–Att–Int	24–42–0	27–34–0
Time of possession	24:19	35:41

Team	Category	Player	Statistics
Florida Atlantic	Passing	N'Kosi Perry	24/42, 364 yards, 5 TD
Florida Atlantic	Rushing	Larry McCammon	14 rushes, 60 yards
Florida Atlantic	Receiving	Je'Quan Burton	5 receptions, 115 yards, 1 TD
Ohio	Passing	Kurtis Rourke	27/34, 345 yards, 4 TD
Ohio	Rushing	Sieh Bangura	23 rushes, 114 yards
Ohio	Receiving	James Bostic	6 receptions, 136 yards, 1 TD

Ohio recovered from an early deficit and then had to hold on to avoid surrendering a late 17 point lead in winning a shootout against Florida Atlantic. Quarterback Kurtis Rourke and freshman kicker Nathanial Vakos both earned MAC East Player of the Week awards.

=== At Penn State ===
Ohio Bobcats (1–0) vs. Penn State Nittany Lions (1–0)

Quarter	1	2	3	4	Total
Ohio	0	7	0	3	10
Penn State	14	12	14	6	46

at Beaver Stadium, University Park, Pennsylvania

- Date: Saturday, September 10, 2022
- Game time: 12:00 p.m. EDT
- Game weather: cloudy, Temperature:73 °F (23 °C)
- Game attendance: 107,306
- Referee: Kole Knueppel
- TV announcers (ABC): Dave Pasch, Dusty Dvoracek, Tom Luginbill
- boxscore, Ohio notes

Game information

First quarter

- (06:45) PSU – Clifford, Sean 1 yd run (Pinegar, Jake kick) 12 plays, 77 yards, TOP 05:51 (PSU 7–0)
- (02:28) PSU – Singleton, Nicholas 70 yd run (Pinegar, Jake kick) 1 plays, 85 yards, TOP 00:30 (PSU 14–0)

Second quarter

- (13:10) PSU – -1 yd safety 1 play, -1 yard, TOP 00:04 (PSU 16–0)
- (05:14) PSU – Pinegar, Jake 25 yd field goal 10 plays, 49 yards, TOP 04:00 (PSU 19–0)
- (01:34) OHIO – Bangura, Sieh 1 yd run (Vakos, Nathanial kick) 8 plays, 75 yards, TOP 03:40 (PSU 19–7)
- (0:15) PSU – Tinsley, Mitchell 7 yd pass from Clifford, Sean (Pinegar, Jake kick) 8 plays, 78 yards, TOP 01:14 (PSU 26–7)

Third quarter

- (09:25) PSU – Evans, Omari 32 yd pass from Allar, Drew (Pinegar, Jake kick) 5 plays, 70 yards, TOP 02:08 (PSU 33–7)
- (04:33) PSU – Singleton, Nicholas 44 yd run (Pinegar, Jake kick) 3 plays, 52 yards, TOP 01:15 (PSU 40–7)

Fourth quarter

- (13:44) PSU – Dinkins, Khalil 28 yd pass from Allar, Drew (kick failed) 9 plays, 55 yards, TOP 04:00 (PSU 46–7)
- (06:50) OHIO – Vakos, Nathanial 21 yd field goal 15 plays, 76 yards, TOP 06:45 (PSU 46–10)

Statistics	OHIO	PSU
First downs	16	27
Total yards	263	572
Rushes/yards	26/99	34/234
Passing yards	264	338
Passing: Comp–Att–Int	17–40–0	31–42–0
Time of possession	28:02	31:58

Team	Category	Player	Statistics
Ohio	Passing	Kurtis Rourke	14/30, 119 yards
Ohio	Rushing	Kurtis Rourke	5 carries, 29 yards
Ohio	Receiving	Sieh Bangura	2 receptions, 35 yards
Penn State	Passing	Sean Clifford	19/27, 213 yards, TD
Penn State	Rushing	Nicholas Singleton	10 carries, 179 yards, 2 TD
Penn State	Receiving	Parker Washington	4 receptions, 60 yards

Penn St jumped out to an early lead and pulled away in an easy 46–10 over the Bobcats.

=== At Iowa State ===
Ohio Bobcats (1–1) vs. Iowa State Cyclones (2–0)

Quarter	1	2	3	4	Total
Ohio	0	3	7	0	10
Iowa State	14	16	7	6	43

at Jack Trice Stadium • Ames, IA

- Date: Saturday, September 17, 2022
- Game time: 2:00 p.m. EDT
- Game weather: cloudy, Temperature:71 °F (22 °C)
- Game attendance: 58,138
- Referee: Ron Hudson
- TV announcers (ESPN+): Chuckie Kempf, Sage Rosenfels, Tori Petry
- boxscore, Ohio notes

Game information

First Quarter

- (10:44) ISU – Dekkers, Hunter 6 yd run (Gilbert, Jace kick) 11 plays, 69 yards, TOP 04:16 (ISU 7–0)
- (01:46) ISU – Hanika, DeShawn 12 yd pass from Dekkers, Hunter (Gilbert, Jace kick) 8 plays, 55 yards, TOP 02:53 (ISU 14–0)

Second Quarter

- (14:57) ISU – Gilbert, Jace 19 yd field goal 4 plays, 7 yards, TOP 01:01 (ISU 17–0)
- (13:07) ISU – Silas, Deon 3 yd run (Gilbert, Jace kick) 5 plays, 51 yards, TOP 01:38 (ISU 24–0)
- (03:35) OHIO – Vakos, Nathanial 45 yd field goal 11 plays, 49 yards, TOP 05:29 (ISU 24–3)
- (00:24) ISU – Shaw, Sean 15 yd pass from Dekkers, Hunter (kick failed) 10 plays, 75 yards, TOP 03:11 (ISU 30–3)

Third Quarter

- (08:22) ISU – Hutchinson, Xavier 13 yd pass from Dekkers, Hunter (Gilbert, Jace kick) 2 plays, 13 yards, TOP 00:10 (ISU 37–3)
- (03:44) OHIO – Foster, Tyler 1 yd pass from Rourke, Kurtis (Vakos, Nathanial kick) 9 plays, 51 yards, TOP 04:30 (ISU 37–10)

Fourth Quarter

- (03:44) ISU – Gilbert, Jace 21 yd field goal 4 plays, 4 yards, TOP 01:20 (ISU 40–10)
- (01:29) ISU – Gilbert, Jace 39 yd field goal 10 plays, 47 yards, TOP 05:31 (ISU 43–10)

Statistics	OHIO	ISU
First downs	12	22
Total yards	233	463
Rushes/yards	22/24	32/163
Passing yards	209	300
Passing: Comp–Att–Int	23–40–2	32–42–0
Time of possession	28:58	31:02

Team	Category	Player	Statistics
Ohio	Passing	Kurtis Rourke	14/30, 194 yards, 1 TD
Ohio	Rushing	Nolan McCormick	7 carries, 43 yards
Ohio	Receiving	Miles Cross	4 receptions, 48 yards
Iowa State	Passing	Hunter Dekkers	28/36, 298 yards, 3 TD
Iowa State	Rushing	Jirehl Brock	7 carries, 78 yards
Iowa State	Receiving	Xavier Hutchinson	9 receptions, 98 yards, 1 TD

The Bobcat offense was shut down for the second straight week as 2022 Iowa State held them to a season low 233 yards in an easy victory for the Cyclones.

=== Vs. Fordham ===
Fordham Rams (3–0) (FCS) vs. Ohio Bobcats (1–2)

Quarter	1	2	3	4	Total
Fordham	0	21	28	3	52
Ohio	14	17	7	21	59

at Peden Stadium • Athens, OH

- Date: Saturday, September 24, 2022
- Game time: 2:00 p.m. EDT
- Game weather: cloudy, Temperature:64 °F (18 °C)
- Game attendance: 19,024
- Referee: William Williams
- TV announcers (ESPN+): Michael Reghi, Je'Rod Cherry
- boxscore, Ohio notes

Game information

First Quarter

- (07:22) OHIO – Rourke, Kurtis 1 yd run (Vakos, Nathanial kick) 14 plays, 75 yards, TOP 07:38 (OHIO 7–0)
- (01:24) OHIO – Foster, Tyler 39 yd pass from Rourke, Kurtis (Vakos, Nathanial kick) 5 plays, 99 yards, TOP 02:15 (OHIO 14–0)

Second Quarter

- (13:53) FORD – Kokosioulis, Fotis 33 yd pass from DeMorat, Tim (Peskin, Brandon kick) 8 plays, 75 yards, TOP 02:31 (OHIO 14–7)
- (06:30) OHIO – Vakos, Nathanial 34 yd field goal 14 plays, 57 yards, TOP 07:18 (OHIO 17-7)
- (05:26) FORD – Kokosioulis, Fotis 74 yd pass from DeMorat, Tim (Peskin, Brandon kick) 3 plays, 75 yards, TOP 01:04 (OHIO 17–14)
- (02:50) OHIO – Toledo, Tyler 13 yd run (Vakos, Nathanial kick) 6 plays, 75 yards, TOP 02:30 (OHIO 24–14)
- (01:50) FORD – Carter, Dequece 9 yd pass from DeMorat, Tim (Peskin, Brandon kick) 3 plays, 60 yards, TOP 01:00 (OHIO 24–21)
- (00:06) OHIO – Jones, Jacoby 21 yd pass from Rourke, Kurtis (Vakos, Nathanial kick) 8 plays, 84 yards, TOP 01:42 (OHIO 31–21)

Third Quarter

- (13:37) FORD – Kokosioulis, Fotis 45 yd pass from DeMorat, Tim (Peskin, Brandon kick) 6 plays, 74 yards, TOP 01:17 (OHIO 31–28)
- (13:23) OHIO – Wilburn, Keegan 98 yd kickoff return (Vakos, Nathanial kick) (OHIO 38–28)
- (11:18) FORD – Wright, MJ 25 yd pass from DeMorat, Tim (Peskin, Brandon kick) 6 plays, 66 yards, TOP 01:56 (OHIO 38–35)
- (03:27) FORD – Loughridge, Julius 2 yd run (Peskin, Brandon kick) 10 plays, 71 yards, TOP 03:22 (FORD 42–38)
- (00:53) FORD – Kokosioulis, Fotis 84 yd pass from DeMorat, Tim (Peskin, Brandon kick) 1 plays, 74 yards, TOP 00:22 (FORD 49–38)

Fourth Quarter

- (14:13) OHIO – Foster, Tyler 21 yd pass from Rourke, Kurtis (Cross, Miles pass) 5 plays, 62 yards, TOP 01:35 (FORD 49–46)
- (10:36) FORD – Peskin, Brandon 36 yd field goal 9 plays, 56 yards, TOP 03:37 (FORD 52–46)
- (00:52) OHIO – Jones, Jacoby 5 yd pass from Rourke, Kurtis (Vakos, Nathanial kick) 9 plays, 77 yards, TOP 01:32 (OHIO 53–52)
- (00:00) OHIO – Houston, Bryce 42 yd fumble recovery ( ) (OHIO 59–52)

Statistics	FORD	OHIO
First downs	28	32
Total yards	640	692
Rushes/yards	33/137	32/155
Passing yards	503	537
Passing: Comp–Att–Int	27-35-0	41-50-0
Time of possession	23:13	36:47

Team	Category	Player	Statistics
Fordham	Passing	Tim DeMorat	27/35, 503 yards, 6 TD
Fordham	Rushing	Trey Sneed	19 rushes, 88 yards
Fordham	Receiving	Fotis Kokosioulis	13 receptions, 320 yards, 4 TD
Ohio	Passing	Kurtis Rourke	41/50, 537 yards, 4 TD
Ohio	Rushing	Nolan McCormick	17 rushes, 62 yards
Ohio	Receiving	Jacoby Jones	6 receptions, 104 yards, 2 TD

In another shootout win Kurtis Rourke passed for 537 yards which was the most in Bobcat History while earning his second MAC East Offensive Player of the Week award of the season. Fordham's Fotis Kokosioulis broke the Patriot League record for receiving yards in a game with 320 and was player of the week for the entire FCS.

=== At Kent State ===
Ohio Bobcats (2–2, 0–0) vs. Kent State Golden Flashes (1–3, 0–0)

Quarter	1	2	3	4	OT	Total
Ohio	0	10	7	7	0	24
Kent State	7	0	3	14	7	31

at Dix Stadium • Kent, OH

- Date: Saturday, October 1, 2022
- Game time: 3:30 p.m. EDT
- Game weather: cloudy, Temperature:62 °F (17 °C)
- Game attendance: 20,392
- Referee: David Siegle
- TV announcers (ESPN+): Michael Reghi, Ryan Cavanaugh
- box score, Ohio notes

Game information

First Quarter

- (11:30 KENT) – Cooper, Marquez 3 yd run (Glass, Andrew kick) 6 plays, 90 yards, TOP 01:41 (KENT 7–0)

Second Quarter

- (11:47 OHIO) – McCormick, Nolan 6 yd pass from Rourke, Kurtis (Vakos, Nathanial kick) 13 plays, 80 yards, TOP 05:29 (Tied 7–7)
- (03:46 OHIO) – Vakos, Nathanial 28 yd field goal 10 plays, 59 yards, TOP 06:02 (OHIO 10–7)

Third Quarter

- (09:51 KENT) – Glass, Andrew 50 yd field goal 8 plays, 37 yards, TOP 02:27 (Tied 10–10)
- (00:47 OHIO) – Bangura, Sieh 50 yd run (Vakos, Nathanial kick) 3 plays, 70 yards, TOP 01:38 (OHIO 17–10)

Fourth Quarter

- (04:11 KENT) – Cephas, Dante 29 yd pass from Schlee, Collin (Glass, Andrew kick) 8 plays, 90 yards, TOP 02:46 (Tied 17–17)
- (03:54 OHIO) – Wiglusz, Sam 71 yd pass from Rourke, Kurtis (Vakos, Nathanial kick) 1 plays, 71 yards, TOP 00:12 (OHIO 24–17)
- (01:44 KENT) – Schlee, Collin 2 yd run (Glass, Andrew kick) 8 plays, 75 yards, TOP 02:10 (Tied 24–24)

Overtime

- (00:00 KENT) – Cooper, Marquez 1 yd run (Glass, Andrew kick) 4 plays, 25 yards, TOP 00:00 (KENT 31–24)

Statistics	OHIO	KENT
First downs	19	36
Total yards	450	736
Rushes/yards	30/128	59/338
Passing yards	322	398
Passing: Comp–Att–Int	25–39–0	24–37–0
Time of possession	30:06	29:54

Team	Category	Player	Statistics
Ohio	Passing	Kurtis Rourke	25/39, 322 yards, 2 TD
Ohio	Rushing	Sieh Bangura	18 rushes, 99 yards, 1 TD
Ohio	Receiving	Sam Wiglusz	6 receptions, 115 yards, 1 TD
Kent State	Passing	Collin Schlee	24/37, 398 yards, 1 TD
Kent State	Rushing	Marquez Cooper	40 rushes, 240 yards, 2 TD
Kent State	Receiving	Dante Cephas	13 receptions, 246 yards, 1 TD

Kent State won a shootout in overtime. Ohio's defense continued to struggle as they gave up 736 yards in the game, of which, 711 yards were in regulation. Kent State's running back Marquez Cooper and wide receiver Dante Cephas became the first FBS teammates to respectively get 240 yards rushing and receiving in the same game.

=== Vs. Akron ===
Akron Zips (1–4, 0–1) vs. Ohio Bobcats (2–3, 0–1)

Quarter	1	2	3	4	Total
Akron	0	13	7	14	34
Ohio	14	14	20	7	55

at Peden Stadium • Athens, OH

- Date: Saturday, October 9, 2022
- Game time: 2:00 p.m. EDT
- Game weather: sunny, Temperature:56 °F (13 °C)
- Game attendance: 23,108
- Referee: Jeremy Valentine
- TV announcers (ESPN3): Anthony Lima, Rob Generelli
- box score, Ohio notes

Game information

First Quarter

- (14:48) OHIO – Wiglusz, Sam 75 yd pass from Rourke, Kurtis (Vakos, Nathanial kick) 1 plays, 75 yards, TOP 00:12 (OHIO 7–0)
- (03:31) OHIO – McCormick, Nolan 8 yd run (Vakos, Nathanial kick) 12 plays, 63 yards, TOP 07:06 (OHIO 14–0)

Second Quarter

- (13:26) AKR – Perez, Noah 25 yd field goal 10 plays, 61 yards, TOP 04:59 (OHIO 14–3)
- (09:29) OHIO – Bangura, Sieh 12 yd run (Vakos, Nathanial kick) 7 plays, 89 yards, TOP 03:50 (OHIO 21–3)
- (06:28) AKR – Perez, Noah 42 yd field goal 7 plays, 51 yards, TOP 03:01 (OHIO 21–6)
- (00:45) AKR – Irons, DJ 18 yd run (Perez, Noah kick) 9 plays, 83 yards, TOP 01:46 (OHIO 21–13)
- (00:00) OHIO – Bangura, Sieh 1 yd run (Vakos, Nathanial kick) 6 plays, 78 yards, TOP 00:41 (OHIO 28–13)

Third Quarter

- (11:38) AKR – Price III, Clyde 4 yd run (Perez, Noah kick) 10 plays, 65 yards, TOP 03:22 (OHIO 28–20)
- (09:14) OHIO – Wiglusz, Sam 30 yd pass from Rourke, Kurtis (Vakos, Nathanial kick) 5 plays, 60 yards, TOP 02:16 (OHIO 35–20)
- (05:13) OHIO – Bangura, Sieh 25 yd pass from Rourke, Kurtis (kick failed) 6 plays, 65 yards, TOP 02:13 (OHIO 41–20)
- (04:45) OHIO – McCrory, Jack 13 yd fumble recovery (Vakos, Nathanial kick) (OHIO 48–20)

Fourth Quarter

- (14:54) AKR – Price III, Clyde 3 yd run (Perez, Noah kick) 10 plays, 72 yards, TOP 04:54 (OHIO 48–27)
- (05:24) AKR – Price III, Clyde 1 yd run (Perez, Noah kick) 13 plays, 83 yards, TOP 06:24 (OHIO 48–34)
- (03:08) OHIO – Bangura, Sieh 6 yd run (Vakos, Nathanial kick) 4 plays, 48 yards, TOP 02:15 (OHIO 55–34)

Statistics	AKR	OHIO
First downs	33	25
Total yards	473	561
Rushes/yards	26/60	31/134
Passing yards	418	427
Passing: Comp–Att–Int	43–54–1	24–27–0
Time of possession	32:24	27:36

Team	Category	Player	Statistics
Akron	Passing	DJ Irons	43/54, 418 yards, 3 TD, 1 INT
Akron	Rushing	Clyde Price III	14 rushes, 47 yards, 3 TD
Akron	Receiving	Shocky Jacques-Louis	11 receptions, 152 yards, 2 TD
Ohio	Passing	Kurtis Rourke	24/27, 427 yards, 3 TD
Ohio	Rushing	Sieh Bangura	16 rushes, 92 yards, 3 TD
Ohio	Receiving	Sam Wiglusz	7 receptions, 144 yards, 2 TD

Ohio won by 21 points in spite of surrendering 473 yards to Akron. Through six games Ohio was surrendering 40.6 points, 561 yards, and 387 passing yards per game to opposing offenses. The Bobcat offense continued to shine helping Ohio get to 3–3 on the season. With their first conference win they moved to 1–1 record in the MAC. Sam Wiglusz had 7 catches for 144 yards and 2 touchdowns while Kurtis Rourke had 427 yards passing and 4 touchdowns along with 32 rushing yards. However, it was Sieh Bangura who won MAC East Offensive Player of the Week with 92 rushing yards and 4 total touchdowns.

=== At Western Michigan ===
Ohio Bobcats (3–3, 1–1) vs. Western Michigan Broncos (2–4, 1–1)

Quarter	1	2	3	4	Total
Ohio	7	13	0	13	33
Western Michigan	7	7	0	0	14

at Waldo Stadium • Kalamazoo, MI

- Date: Saturday, October 16, 2022
- Game time: 3:30 p.m. EDT
- Game weather: sunny, Temperature:49 °F (9 °C)
- Game attendance: 20,320
- Referee: Matt Packowski
- TV announcers (CBSSN): John Sadak, Randy Cross
- box score, Ohio notes

Game information

First Quarter

- (08:44) OHIO – Bangura, Sieh 1 yd run (Vakos, Nathanial kick) 12 plays, 75 yards, TOP 06:16 (OHIO 7–0)
- (04:23) WMU – Salopek, Jack 8 yd run (Domschke, Palmer kick) 8 plays, 64 yards, TOP 04:15 (Tied 7–7)

Second Quarter

- (12:59) OHIO – Bangura, Sieh 6 yd run (Vakos, Nathanial kick) 11 plays, 75 yards, TOP 06:24 (OHIO 14–7)
- (01:50) OHIO – Vakos, Nathanial 26 yd field goal 9 plays, 52 yards, TOP 03:17 (OHIO 17–7)
- (01:05) WMU – Crooms, Corey 74 yd pass from Salopek, Jack (Domschke, Palmer kick) 2 plays, 75 yards, TOP 00:45 (Tied 17–14)
- (00:06) OHIO – Vakos, Nathanial 55 yd field goal 5 plays, 22 yards, TOP 00:59 (OHIO 20–14)

Third Quarter

- No scoring plays

Fourth Quarter

- (13:48) OHIO – Vakos, Nathanial 33 yd field goal 4 plays, 1 yards, TOP 00:25 (OHIO 23–14)
- (07:24) OHIO – Rourke, Kurtis 1 yd run (Vakos, Nathanial kick) 2 plays, 8 yards, TOP 00:48 (OHIO 30–14)
- (03:11) OHIO – Vakos, Nathanial 35 yd field goal 7 plays, 41 yards, TOP 03:32 (OHIO 33–14)

Statistics	OHIO	WMU
First downs	17	17
Total yards	383	333
Rushes/yards	35/119	31/84
Passing yards	264	249
Passing: Comp–Att–Int	22–34–1	17–31–5
Time of possession	33:20	26:40

Team	Category	Player	Statistics
Ohio	Passing	Kurtis Rourke	22/34, 264 yards, 1 INT
Ohio	Rushing	Sieh Bangura	25 rushes, 77 yards, 2 TD
Ohio	Receiving	Sam Wiglusz	8 receptions, 76 yards
Western Michigan	Passing	Jack Salopek	17/31, 249 yards, 1 TD, 5 INT
Western Michigan	Rushing	Sean Tyler	19 rushes, 84 yards
Western Michigan	Receiving	Corey Crooms	5 receptions, 87 yards, 1 TD

Ohio's defense had their best game of the season to this point giving up only 14 points while forcing 6 turnovers, 5 of which were interceptions, and getting 5 sacks and 8 tackles for losses. However, the passing offense was slowed some for the first time since back to back games against power five teams Penn State and Iowa St. as Kurtis Rourke was held to 264 yards. It was the running game on offense and impressive kicking that carried the way. Freshman running back Sieh Bangura earned his second straight MAC East Offensive Player of the Week and Nataniel Vakos earned his second special teams player of the week award of the season by converting on 4 field goals including a career long of 55 yards. That helped the Bobcats score 33 points to defeat Western Michigan.

=== Vs. Northern Illinois ===
Northern Illinois Huskies (2–5, 1–2) vs. Ohio Bobcats (4–3, 2–1)

Quarter	1	2	3	4	Total
Northern Illinois	0	6	11	0	17
Ohio	7	3	7	7	24

at Peden Stadium • Athens, OH

- Date: Saturday, October 23, 2022
- Game time: 2:00 p.m. EDT
- Game weather: sunny, Temperature:69 °F (21 °C)
- Game attendance: 15,922
- Referee: Greg Sujack
- TV announcers (ESPN+): Anthony Lima, Ryan Cavanaugh
- box score, Ohio notes

Game information

First Quarter

- (11:50) OHIO – Wiglusz, Sam 8 yd pass from Rourke, Kurtis (Vakos, Nathanial kick) 9 plays, 84 yards, TOP 03:49 (OHIO 7–0)

Second Quarter

- (10:49) NIU – Richardson, John 38 yd field goal 12 plays, 34 yards, TOP 05:48 (OHIO 7–3)
- (04:07) NIU – Richardson, John 27 yd field goal 10 plays, 67 yards, TOP 04:41 (OHIO 7–6)
- (00:19) OHIO – Vakos, Nathanial 31 yd field goal 7 plays, 61 yards, TOP 03:48 (OHIO 10–6)

Third Quarter

- (10:56) NIU – Richardson, John 45 yd field goal 9 plays, 48 yards, TOP 04:04 (OHIO 10–9)
- (04:16) OHIO – Rourke, Kurtis 1 yd run (Vakos, Nathanial kick) 13 plays, 81 yards, TOP 06:34 (OHIO 17–9)
- (01:31) NIU – Rutkiewicz, Kacper 11 yd run (Thornton, Shemar pass) 6 plays, 75 yards, TOP 02:45 (Tied 17–17)

Fourth Quarter

- (07:00) OHIO – Wiglusz, Sam 22 yd pass from Rourke, Kurtis (Vakos, Nathanial kick) 11 plays, 90 yards, TOP 04:26 (OHIO 24–17)

Statistics	NIU	OHIO
First downs	17	20
Total yards	377	354
Rushes/yards	48/267	33/154
Passing yards	110	200
Passing: Comp–Att–Int	9–18–0	14–26–0
Time of possession	32:30	27:30

Team	Category	Player	Statistics
Northern Illinois	Passing	Justin Lynch	9/18, 110 yards
Northern Illinois	Rushing	Antario Brown	16 carries, 160 yards
Northern Illinois	Receiving	Kacper Rutkiewicz	1 reception, 41 yards
Ohio	Passing	Kurtis Rourke	14/26, 200 yards, 2 TD
Ohio	Rushing	Kurtis Rourke	7 carries, 61 yards, 1 TD
Ohio	Receiving	Sam Wiglusz	6 receptions, 69 yards, 2 TD

Ohio picked up its third straight win. The defense led the way for a second straight game, giving up only 17 points, while Ohio's passing game was held to a season low to that point 200 yards.

=== Vs. Buffalo ===
Buffalo Bulls (4–3, 4–0) vs. Ohio Bobcats (5–3, 3–1)

Quarter	1	2	3	4	Total
Buffalo	0	10	14	0	24
Ohio	17	7	7	14	45

at Peden Stadium • Athens, OH

- Date: Tuesday, November 1, 2022
- Game time: 7:30 p.m. EDT
- Game weather: • cloudy, Temperature:57 °F (14 °C)
- Game attendance: 16,401
- Referee: William Williams
- TV announcers (ESPN2): Mike Corey, Tom Luginbill, Taylor McGregor
- box score, Ohio notes

Game information

First Quarter

- (11:22) OHIO – Wiglusz, Sam 16 yd pass from Rourke, Kurtis (Vakos, Nathanial kick) 5 plays, 70 yards, TOP 01:57 (OHIO 7–0)
- (06:01) OHIO – Vakos, Nathanial 37 yd field goal 8 plays, 45 yards, TOP 03:18 (OHIO 10–0)
- (01:38) OHIO – Jones, Jacoby 5 yd pass from Rourke, Kurtis (Vakos, Nathanial kick) 5 plays, 42 yards, TOP 02:49 (OHIO 17–0)

Second Quarter

- (12:05) UB – McNulty, Alex 28 yd field goal 10 plays, 65 yards, TOP 04:33 (OHIO 17–3)
- (04:03) OHIO – Wiglusz, Sam 5 yd pass from Rourke, Kurtis (Vakos, Nathanial kick) 5 plays, 62 yards, TOP 02:54 (OHIO 24–3)
- (00:20) UB – Marshall, Justin 12 yd pass from Snyder, Cole (McNulty, Alex kick) 8 plays, 35 yards, TOP 01:12 (OHIO 24–10)

Third Quarter

- (14:00) UB – Cobb, Keyshawn 26 Yd Interception Return (McNulty, Alex kick) 3 plays, 6 yards, TOP 00:55 (OHIO 24–17)
- (10:05) OHIO – Cross, Miles 2 yd pass from Rourke, Kurtis (Vakos, Nathanial kick) 8 plays, 75 yards, TOP 03:55 (OHIO 31–17)
- (01:46) UB – Washington, Mike 2 yd pass from Snyder, Cole (McNulty, Alex kick) 14 plays, 56 yards, TOP 06:53 (OHIO 31–24)

Fourth Quarter

- (13:16) OHIO – Neatherton, Jake 1 yd run (Vakos, Nathanial kick) 7 plays, 80 yards, TOP 03:24 (OHIO 38–24)
- (12:10) OHIO – Cross, Miles 9 yd pass from Rourke, Kurtis (Vakos, Nathanial kick) 2 plays, 12 yards, TOP 00:51 (OHIO 45–24)

Statistics	UB	OHIO
First downs	17	20
Total yards	260	474
Rushes/yards	22	157
Passing yards	238	317
Passing: Comp–Att–Int	25–49–1	20–29–1
Time of possession	29:46	30:14

Team	Category	Player	Statistics
Buffalo	Passing	Cole Snyder	25/49, 238 yards, 2 TD, 1 INT
Buffalo	Rushing	Mike Washington	6 carries, 19 yards
Buffalo	Receiving	Justin Marshall	6 receptions, 72 yards, 1 TD
Ohio	Passing	Kurtis Rourke	20/29, 317 yards, 5 TD, 1 INT
Ohio	Rushing	Jake Neatherton	13 carries, 68 yards, 1 TD
Ohio	Receiving	Sam Wiglusz	6 receptions, 131 yards, 2 TD

In a Tuesday night game, Ohio became the only team in the MAC East to control its own destiny by defeating Buffalo who had been previously unbeaten in MAC play. Ohio jumped out to a 24–3 lead behind 3 touchdown passes by Kurtis Rourke. Two of these touchdown receptions were by Sam Wiglusz and one was by Jacoby Jones. With 1:20 left in the half a 20-yard punt by Ohio setup Buffalo for a quick touchdown drive just before halftime. Ohio received the second half kickoff up by 14 but Rourke threw an interception that was returned by Buffalo's Keyshawn Cobb for a touchdown on the third play from scrimmage in the second half. Buffalo was back to within 24–17. The Bobcats responded with another Rourke touchdown pass caught by Miles Cross on the ensuing drive. Ohio fumbled on its next drive setting up another Buffalo touchdown to get the Bulls back within 7. A fourth quarter touchdown run by Jake Neatherton and a school record tying fifth touchdown pass by Rourke to Miles Cross sealed the win for the Bobcats.

Ohio's defense continued its sudden second half turnaround as they held Buffalo to 260 total yards. Linebacker Keye Thompson had 11 tackles and 2 fumble recoveries. Thompson and Rourke were named MAC East Defensive and Offensive Players of the week.

=== At Miami (OH) ===
Ohio Bobcats (6–3, 4–1) vs. Miami RedHawks (4–5, 2–3)

Quarter	1	2	3	4	Total
Ohio	7	3	14	13	37
Miami	0	7	7	7	21

at Yager Stadium • Oxford, OH

- Date: Tuesday, November 8, 2022
- Game time: 7:30 p.m.. EST
- Game weather: • cloudy, Temperature:57 °F (14 °C)
- Game attendance: : 15,490
- Referee: Greg, Sujack
- TV announcers (ESPN2): Jay Alter, Tom Luginbill, Coley Harvey
- box score, Ohio notes

Game information

First Quarter

- (05:46) OHIO – Bangura, Sieh 1 yd run (Vakos, Nathanial kick) 3 plays, 54 yards, TOP 01:17 (OHIO 7–0)

Second Quarter

- (13:11) MIA – Hippenhammer, Mac 5 yd pass from Gabbert, Brett (Dzioban, Dom kick) 8 plays, 72 yards, TOP 02:42 (Tied 7–7)
- (00:00) OHIO – Vakos, Nathanial 25 yd field goal 14 plays, 67 yards, TOP 06:07 (OHIO 10-7)

Third Quarter

- (07:35) OHIO – Bangura, Sieh 13 yd pass from Rourke, Kurtis (Vakos, Nathanial kick) 13 plays, 76 yards, TOP 07:20 (OHIO 17–7)
- (06:18) MIA – Hippenhammer, Mac 37 yd pass from Gabbert, Brett (Dzioban, Dom kick) 3 plays, 75 yards, TOP 01:17 (OHIO 17–14)
- (04:49) OHIO – Jones, Jacoby 48 yd pass from Rourke, Kurtis (Vakos, Nathanial kick) 4 plays, 73 yards, TOP 01:13 (OHIO 24–14)

Fourth Quarter

- (11:18) OHIO – Jones, Jacoby 10 yd pass from Rourke, Kurtis (Vakos, Nathanial kick) 10 plays, 67 yards, TOP 05:34 (OHIO 31–14)
- (08:39) MIA – Hippenhammer, Mac 11 yd pass from Gabbert, Brett (Dzioban, Dom kick) 8 plays, 83yards, TOP 02:34 (OHIO 31–21)
- (06:14) OHIO – Vakos, Nathanial 25 yd field goal 7 plays, 80 yards, TOP 02:17 (OHIO 34-21)
- (00:28) OHIO – Vakos, Nathanial 21 yd field goal 8 plays, 30 yards, TOP 04:42 (OHIO 37-21)

Statistics	OHIO	MIA
First downs	27	16
Total yards	557	314
Rushes/yards	43/194	21/69
Passing yards	363	245
Passing: Comp–Att–Int	25–35–0	20–26–0
Time of possession	41:20	18:40

Team	Category	Player	Statistics
Ohio	Passing	Kurtis Rourke	25/35, 363 yards, 3 TD
Ohio	Rushing	Sieh Bangura	20 carries, 145 yards, 1 TD
Ohio	Receiving	Miles Cross	6 receptions, 133 yards
Miami	Passing	Brett Gabbert	20/26, 245 yards, 3 TD
Miami	Rushing	Keyon Mozee	6 carries, 27 yards
Miami	Receiving	Mac Hippenhammer	8 receptions, 107 yards, 3 TD

Ohio maintained control of its own destiny in the MAC East with a win over Miami in the Battle of the Bricks. The Bobcats held a 10–7 halftime lead after a 1-yard run touchdown by Sieh Bangura in the first quarter and a Nathanial Vakos field goal on the last play of the half. Ohio's offense took over the game in the second half. They scored on all 5 possessions in the half. The first three drives all ended on touchdown passes from Kurtis Rourke who threw for 363 yards in the game. The Ohio offense was able to hold the ball for 41:20 which helped the defense continue its second half improvement as they held Miami to 314 total yards and 69 yards on the ground. Mac Hippenhammer was the bright spot for Miami as he caught three touchdown passes from Brett Gabbert.

=== At Ball State ===
Ohio Bobcats (7–3, 5–1) vs. Ball State Cardinals (5–5, 3–3)

Quarter	1	2	3	4	Total
Ohio	0	17	2	13	32
Ball State	3	0	8	7	18

at Scheumann Stadium • Muncie, IN

- Date: Tuesday, November 15, 2022
- Game time: 7:00 p.m. EST
- Game weather: snow, Temperature:32 °F (0 °C)
- Game attendance: 6,722
- Referee: Rod Hudson
- TV announcers (ESPN2): Chris Cotter, Dustin Fox, Taylor Davis
- box score, game notes

Game information

First Quarter

- (06:44) BSU – VonGunten, Ben 21 yd field goal 11 plays, 76 yards, TOP 05:28 (BSU 3-0)

Second Quarter

- (13:14) OHIO – Bangura, Sieh 6 yd run (Vakos, Nathanial kick) 15 plays, 81 yards, TOP 08:30 (OHIO 7–3)
- (08:13) OHIO – Wiglusz, Sam 13 yd pass from Rourke, Kurtis (Vakos, Nathanial kick) 5 plays, 42 yards, TOP 02:45 (OHIO 14–3)
- (03:34) OHIO – Vakos, Nathanial 21 yd field goal 7 plays, 61 yards, TOP 03:46 (OHIO 17-3)

Third Quarter

- (08:46) OHIO – -1 yd safety 1 play, -1 yard, TOP 00:06 (OHIO 19–3)
- (01:13) BSU – Koziol, Tanner 10 yd pass from Paddock, John (Hunt, Brady pass from Paddock, John) 4 plays, 39 yards, TOP 01:37 (OHIO 19–11)

Fourth Quarter

- (13:52) OHIO – Bangura, Sieh 7 yd run (Vakos, Nathanial kick) 5 plays, 75 yards, TOP 02:20 (OHIO 26–11)
- (09:54) BSU – Hunt, Brady 7 yd pass from Paddock, John (VonGunten, Ben kick) 12 plays, 75 yards, TOP 03:58 (OHIO 26–18)
- (02:44) OHIO – Vakos, Nathanial 37 yd field goal 5 plays, 28 yards, TOP 02:44 (OHIO 29-18)
- (01:00) OHIO – Vakos, Nathanial 23 yd field goal 4 plays, 7 yards, TOP 01:04 (OHIO 32-18)

Statistics	OHIO	BSU
First downs	20	21
Total yards	427	367
Rushes/yards	46/224	19/94
Passing yards	203	273
Passing: Comp–Att–Int	14–24–0	29–48–1
Time of possession	36:38	23:22

Team	Category	Player	Statistics
Ohio	Passing	Kurtis Rourke	12/16, 169 yards
Ohio	Rushing	Sieh Bangura	23 rushes, 148 yards, 2 TD
Ohio	Receiving	Jacoby Jones	5 receptions, 87 yards
Ball State	Passing	John Paddock	29/48, 273 yards, 2 TD, 1 INT
Ball State	Rushing	Carson Steele	23 rushes, 148 yards, 2 TD
Ball State	Receiving	Brady Hunt	9 receptions, 90 yards, 1 TD

Starting quarterback Kurtis Rourke was injured in the second quarter of the game and Ohio was forced to rely on its running game and defense to defeat Ball State. The Bobcats ran for 224 yards with 148 and two touchdowns coming from Sieh Bangura. Ohio's defense forced three turnovers and held the Cardinals to 18 points. Safety Alvin Floyd had an interception ad 12 tackles to earn MAC East Defensive player of the week.

=== Vs. Bowling Green ===
Bowling Green Falcons (6–5, 5–2) vs. Ohio Bobcats (8–3, 6–1)

Quarter	1	2	3	4	Total
Bowling Green	7	28	0	7	42
Ohio	0	0	3	7	10

at Peden Stadium • Athens, OH

- Date: Tuesday, November 22, 2022
- Game time: 7:00 p.m. EST
- Game weather: clear, Temperature:50 °F (10 °C)
- Game attendance: 11,693
- Referee: David Siegle
- TV announcers (ESPNU): Connor Onion, Craig Haubert
- box score, game notes

Game information

First Quarter

- (02:21) BGSU – Broden, Tyrone 44 yd pass from McDonald, Matt (Lawler, Mason kick) 9 plays, 89 yards, TOP 04:13 (BGSU 7–0)

Second Quarter

- (11:44) OHIO – Harris, CJ 5 yd run (Vakos, Nathanial kick) 12 plays, 77 yards, TOP 05:35 (Tied 7–7)
- (08:25) OHIO – Wiglusz, Sam 20 yd pass from Harris, CJ (Vakos, Nathanial kick) 5 plays, 79 yards, TOP 01:34 (OHIO 14–7)
- (03:42) OHIO – Bangura, Sieh 3 yd run (Vakos, Nathanial kick) 8 plays, 51 yards, TOP 03:07 (OHIO 21–7)
- (00:24) OHIO – Harris, CJ 8 yd run (Vakos, Nathanial kick) 3 plays, 14 yards, TOP 00:15 (OHIO 28–7)

Third Quarter

- (02:27) OHIO – Vakos, Nathanial 32 yd field goal 15 plays, 71 yards, TOP 07:39 (OHIO 31–7)

Fourth Quarter

- (11:43) OHIO – Harris, CJ 12 yd run (Vakos, Nathanial kick) 7 plays, 33 yards, TOP 03:24 (OHIO 38–7)
- (02:24) BGSU – Orth, Camden 10 yd run (Lawler, Mason kick) 7 plays, 65 yards, TOP 04:05 (OHIO 38–14)

Statistics	BGSU	OHIO
First downs	14	21
Total yards	279	384
Rushes/yards	21/50	54/188
Passing yards	229	196
Passing: Comp–Att–Int	18–32–3	10–21–0
Time of possession	23:41	36:19

Team	Category	Player	Statistics
Bowling Green	Passing	Matt McDonald	16/29, 217 yards, 1 TD, 3 INT
Bowling Green	Rushing	Nick Mosley	4 rushes, 29 yards
Bowling Green	Receiving	Tyrone Broden	2 receptions, 81 yards, 1 TD
Ohio	Passing	CJ Harris	10/21, 196 yards, 1 TD
Ohio	Rushing	Sieh Bangura	27 rushes, 99 yards, 1 TD
Ohio	Receiving	Jacoby Jones	4 receptions, 96 yards

With starting quarterback Kurtis Rourke and backup Parker Navarro out for the season and the MAC East title on the line, Ohio turned to CJ Harris at quarterback. The Bobcats changed their air it out style of offense that was prolific most of the season with Rourke at the helm and played to Harris's strengths by keeping the ball on the ground with 54 total rushing attempts for 204 yards on the game. This helped Ohio to a lopsided edge in time of possession for the third straight game. The defense took advantage and continued their significant second half of the season turnaround in holding the Falcons to 279 yards and netting 3 interceptions and a fumble recovery. Linebacker Keye Thompson led the way with 11 tackles and won MAC East Defensive Player of the Week for the second time in 2022.

Both offenses opened the game very sluggishly. Neither team got a first down on each of their first two drives. It was Bowling Green that struck first on a 44 yd pass from Matt McDonald to Tyrone Broden. But Ohio struck back with a five-yard run touchdown by Harris and, following an interception of McDonald, a Harris touchdown pass to Sam Wiglusz on their next two drives. After a Falcon punt, Sieh Bangura put Ohio in command with a 21–7 lead after a 3-yard touchdown run with 3:42 left in the half. Tariq Drake set Ohio up to score again with an interception of McDonald that was returned to the Falcon 14 with 39 seconds left in the half. Harris took advantage with an 8-yard touchdown run on the third play of the drive just before halftime.

After the teams exchanged punts to open the half the Bobcats ate up most of what was left on the third quarter with a 15 play drive that ended in a Nathanial Vakos field goal. Harris's third touchdown run of the game early in the fourth quarter put the game out of reach with a 38–7 lead. Harris finished with 196 passing yards, 65 rushing yards, and accounted for 4 touchdowns and was named MAC East Offensive Player of the Week. A late Falcon touchdown made the final 38–14. The Bobcats won the MAC East for the first time since 2016 and the right to take on Toledo in the MAC championship.

=== Vs. Toledo ===
2022 Rocket Mortgage MAC Championship Game - Toledo Rockets (7–5, 5–3) vs. Ohio Bobcats (9–3, 7–1)

Quarter	1	2	3	4	Total
Toledo	7	3	0	7	17
Ohio	0	7	0	0	7

at Ford Field • Detroit, MI

- Date: Saturday, December 3, 2022
- Game time: 12:00 p.m. EST
- Game weather: indoor, Temperature:72 °F (22 °C)
- TV announcers (ESPN): Beth Mowins, Kirk Morrison, Stormy Buonantony
- box score, game notes

Game information

First Quarter

- (11:38) UT – Stuart, Jacquez 29 yard rush, (Cluckey, Thomas kick) 8 plays, 75 yards, 3:22 (UT 7–0)

Second Quarter

- (06:47) OHIO – Bangura, Sieh 2 yard rush, (Vakos, Nathanial kick) 14 plays, 84 yards, 7:14 (Tied 7–7)
- (00:16) UT – Cluckey, Thomas 44 yard field goal 13 plays, 55 yards, 4:38 (UT 10–7)

Third Quarter

- No scoring plays

Fourth Quarter

- (10:36 UT) – Blankumsee, DeMeer 16 yard pass from Dequan Finn, (Cluckey, Thomas kick) 16 plays, 90 yards, 7:15 (UT 17–7)

Statistics	UT	OHIO
First downs	20	14
Plays–Yards	71–390	60–262
Rushes/yards	46–236	29–99
Passing yards	154	163
Passing: Comp–Att–Int	16–25–0	17–31–1
Time of possession	33:00	27:00

Team	Category	Player	Statistics
Toledo	Passing	Dequan Finn	16/25, 154 yards, 1 TD
Toledo	Rushing	Jacquez Stuart	9 carries, 93 yards, 1 TD
Toledo	Receiving	Jerjuan Newton	6 receptions, 77 yards
Ohio	Passing	CJ Harris	17/31, 163 yards, 1 INT
Ohio	Rushing	Sieh Bangura	20 carries, 56 yards, 1 TD
Ohio	Receiving	Will Kacmarek	2 receptions, 39 yards

Toledo came in to the championship game with the #1 defense in the MAC and was able to shut down Ohio's offense. The Bobcats were held to 7 points and 262 total yards and were denied their first conference championship since 1968. Toledo struck first behind a 29-yard run by Jacquez Stuart. Ohio evened things in the second quarter with a 2-yard run by Sieh Bangura. An interception by quarterback Ohio's CJ Harris, playing for the injured MAC player of the Year, Kurtis Rourke, allowed Toledo to go into the half with a 10–7 lead on a field goal with 16 seconds remaining. That was all the points the Rockets would need. A fourth quarter touchdown reception by DeMeer Blankumsee from Dequan Finn made the final 17–7 in a defensive slugfest.

=== Vs. Wyoming ===
2022 Barstool Sports Arizona Bowl - Ohio Bobcats (9–4) vs Wyoming Cowboys (7–5)

Quarter	1	2	3	4	OT	Total
Ohio	8	3	7	6	6	30
Wyoming	14	3	0	7	3	27

at Arizona Stadium • Tucson, Arizona

- Date: Friday, December 30, 2022
- Game time: 2:30 p.m. MST
- Game weather: Temperature: 60 °F (16 °C) • Wind
- Referee: Jeremy Parker
- TV announcers (Barstool Sports): Jake Marsh, Dan Katz, Dave Portnoy, Caleb Pressley, and Adam Ferrone
- box score, game notes

Game information

First Quarter

- (10:12) UW – Vaughn, Jordon 17 yd run (Hoyland, John kick) 9 plays, 70 yards, TOP 04:42 (UW 7–0)
- (08:23) OHIO – Jones, Jacoby 34 yd pass from Harris, CJ (Holloway, Justin pass) 5 plays, 58 yards, TOP 01:40 (OHIO 8–7)
- (03:58) UW – Welch, Treyton 17 yd pass from Peasley, Andrew (Hoyland, John kick) 1 plays, 17 yards, TOP 00:07 (UW 14–8)

Second Quarter

- (13:28) OHIO – Vakos, Nathanial 43 yd field goal 12 plays, 49 yards, TOP 05:30 (UW 14–11)
- (00:04) UW – Hoyland, John 53 yd field goal 8 plays, 30 yards, TOP 01:07 (UW 17–11)

Third Quarter

- (05:14) OHIO – Bangura, Sieh 3 yd run (Vakos, Nathanial kick) 4 plays, 56 yards, TOP 02:07 (OHIO 18–17)

Fourth Quarter

- (04:17) OHIO – Vakos, Nathanial 45 yd field goal 7 plays, 38 yards, TOP 04:03 (OHIO 21–17)
- (02:08) UW – Vaughn, Jordon 5 yd run (Hoyland, John kick) 6 plays, 75 yards, TOP 02:09 (UW 24–21)
- (00:04) OHIO – Vakos, Nathanial 46 yd field goal 10 plays, 55 yards, TOP 01:59 (Tied 24–27)

Overtime

- (00:00) UW – Hoyland, John 29 yd field goal 5 plays, 14 yards, TOP 00:00 (UW 27–24)
- (00:00) OHIO – Foster, Tyler 10 yd pass from Harris, CJ ( ) 5 plays, 25 yards, TOP 00:00 (OHIO 30–27)

Statistics	OHIO	UW
First downs	22	17
Plays–Yards	72–385	63–291
Rushes/yards	38/201	33/105
Passing yards	184	186
Passing: Comp–Att–Int	20–34–0	18–30–1
Time of possession	30:49	29:11

Team	Category	Player	Statistics
Ohio	Passing	CJ Harris	20/33, 184 yards, 2 TD
Ohio	Rushing	Sieh Bangura	25 carries, 143 yards, 1 TD
Ohio	Receiving	Jacoby Jones	3 receptions, 44 yards, 1 TD
Wyoming	Passing	Andrew Peasley	18/30, 186 yards, 1 TD, 1 INT
Wyoming	Rushing	Jordon Vaughn	16 carries, 68 yards, 2 TD
Wyoming	Receiving	Treyton Welch	5 receptions, 91 yards, 1 TD

Wyoming scored on their first possession on a run by Jordon Vaughn. Ohio scored on a deep pass from CJ Harris to Jacoby Jones on their first possession. Ohio faked the extra point attempt. Holder Jonah Wieland passed to Justin Holloway for a two-Point Conversion. Wyoming was stopped on their second drive but Ohio fumbled the punt. That led to an Andrew Peasley pass to Treyton Welch for a touchdown on the ensuing play and a 14–8 Wyoming lead. Ohio made the score 14–11 with a field goal on their next drive. Both teams failed to get points on each of both teams' next two drives but Wyoming went into the half up by 6 with a long 53-yard field goal by John Hoyland. The teams exchanged four consecutive punts before Ohio regained the lead on a run by Sieh Bangura. After Torrie Cox Jr. intercepted a Peasley pass the teams exchanged punts again before Ohio extended their lead to four on a second Nathanial Vakos field goal. Wyoming marched down the field and took the lead on another Jordon Vaughn run with just two minutes remaining. Ohio tied the game with just four seconds remaining on a third field goal from Nathanial Vakos. Wyoming was held to a field goal on their first possession in overtime. On Ohio's possession they reached a 3rd down and 8 yards to go from the Wyoming 10 yard line when CJ Harris hit Tyler Foster in the back corner of the end zone sealing Ohio's first bowl win since the Famous Idaho Potato Bowl following the 2019 season. CJ Harris was named the game's MVP with 184 yards passing and two touchdowns.

== Statistics ==
Through December 30, 2022

=== Team ===
	Ohio	Opp
Scoring	445	396
Points per game	31.79	28.29
First downs	291	310
Rushing	110	98
Passing	167	188
Penalty	14	24
Rushing yards	2332	2379
Avg per play	4.1	4.3
Avg per game	143.4	140.9
Rushing touchdowns	23	19
Passing yards	3893	4004
Att-Comp-Int	464-302-5	511-333-12
Avg per pass	8.39	7.84
Avg per catch	12.89	12.02
Avg per game	278.07	286.00
Passing touchdowns	28	29
Total offense	5900	5977
Avg per play	6.2	6.2
Avg per game	421.4	426.9
Fumbles-Lost	15-8	25-13
Penalties-Yards	68-618	83-725
Avg per game	44.14	51.79

	Ohio	Opp
Punts-Yards	59-2222	50-2042
Avg per punt	37.66	40.84
Time of possession/Game	32:10	27:50
3rd down conversions	79-188	71-181
4th down conversions	6-17	13-34
Touchdowns scored	28	19
Field goals-Attempts	22-27	17-20
PAT-Attempts	49-50	45-47
Attendance		
Games/Avg per Game		
Neutral Site		

=== Individual Leaders ===
==== Passing ====
Passing statistics
#	NAME	GP	RAT	CMP	ATT	YDS	AVG/G	CMP%	TD	INT	LONG
7	Kurtis Rourke	11	167.71	244	353	3256	296.00	69.12%	24	4	75
10	CJ Harris	7	111.72	52	97	577	82.43	53.61%	3	1	48
13	Parker Navarro	2	71.77	5	12	43	21.50	41.67%	0	0	14
8	Jacoby Jones	12	242.80	1	1	17	1.42	100.00%	0	0	17
	TOTALS		153.32	302	464	3893	278.07	65.09%	28	5	75

==== Rushing ====
Rushing statistics
#	NAME	GP	ATT	GAIN	AVG	TD	LONG	AVG/G
22	Sieh Bangura	12	222	1078	4.9	13	64	89.83
21	Nolan McCormick	13	83	289	3.5	1	20	22.23
7	Kurtis Rourke	11	74	249	3.4	4	61	22.64
36	Jake Neatherton	6	30	126	4.2	1	16	21.00
10	CJ Harris	7	37	168	4.5	3	20	24.00
23	Julian Ross	6	11	67	6.1	0	28	11.17
37	Tyler Toledo	7	5	40	8.0	1	17	5.71
12	Sam Wiglusz	14	2	23	11.5	0	30	1.65
12	Jacoby Jones	14	2	11	5.5	0	6	0.79
19	Miles Cross	14	3	5	1.7	0	4	0.36
64	Shedrick Rhodes	13	0	0	-	0	0	0.00
79	Brody Rodgers	13	0	0	-	0	0	0.00
87	Will Kacmarek	14	1	-1	-1.0	0	0	-0.07
13	Parker Navarro	2	9	-4	-0.4	0	8	-2.00
	Team	14	14	-44	-3.1	0	0	-3.14
	TOTALS		493	2007	4.1	23	64	143.36

==== Receiving ====
Receiving statistics
#	NAME	GP	CTH	YDS	AVG	TD	LONG	AVG/G
12	Sam Wiglusz	14	73	877	12.01	11	75	62.64
8	Jacoby Jones	14	45	776	17.24	6	48	55.43
18	James Bostic	14	33	607	18.39	1	54	43.36
19	Miles Cross	14	47	560	11.91	3	49	40.00
87	Will Kacmerek	14	20	264	13.20	0	32	18.83
22	Sieh Bangura	12	27	226	8.37	2	25	18.83
86	Tyler Foster	13	13	185	14.23	4	39	14.23
21	Nolan McCormick	13	20	164	8.20	1	35	12.62
4	Ty Walton	4	10	108	10.80	0	24	27.00
2	Alec Burton	11	7	49	7.00	0	24	4.45
3	Keegan Wilburn	13	1	34	34.00	0	34	2.62
17	Nigel Drummond II	8	3	27	9.00	0	10	3.38
7	Kurtis Rourke	11	1	17	17.00	0	17	1.55
36	Jake Neatherton	6	1	3	3.00	0	3	0.50
81	Aramoni Rhone	9	0	0	-	0	0	0.00
37	Tyler Toledo	7	1	-4	-4.00	0	0	-0.57
37	TOTALS		302	3893	12.89	28	75	278.07

==== Defense ====
Defense statistics
#	NAME	GP	SOLO	AST	TOT	TFL-YDS	SACK-YDS	INT	BU	QBH	FR	FF	BLK	SAF	TD
38	Keye Thompson	14	45	51	96	6.5-33	1.5-10	1	3	5	2	1	0	0	
32	Bryce Houston	14	40	36	76	11.0-55	5.5-43	0	2	8	2	1	0	0	1
20	Alvin Floyd	14	40	34	74	5.0-17	2.0-13	1	5	0	0	1	0	0	
40	Jack Mccrory	14	29	34	63	7.5-46	4.0-32	0	3	9	2	3	0	0	
19	Zack Sanders	11	41	20	61	2.5-11	1.0-8	3	5	1	0	0	0	0	
7	Torrie Cox jr.	13	37	15	52	3.0-8	0-0	3	6	1	1	2	0	0	
11	Tariq Drake	12	32	19	51	0.5-1	0-0	3	4	0	0	1	0	0	
17	Vonnie Watkins	14	19	27	46	14.0-50	4.5-30	0	2	9	0	2	0	0	
30	Ben Johnson	14	15	28	43	0.5-1	0-0	0	0	0	0	0	0	0	
8	Justin Birchette	14	31	5	36	1.5-4	0-0	0	8	0	1	0	0	0	
33	Cannon Blauser	14	20	13	33	3.5-17	1.0-10	0	1	2	0	1	0	0	
22	Adonis Williams jr.	12	25	6	31	4.0-11	1.0-3	0	0	1	0	0	0	0	
48	Kyle Kelly	14	13	16	29	3.5-9	0.5-5	0	2	2	0	0	0	0	
4	Roman Parodie	13	22	7	29	0-0	0-0	0	8	0	0	0	0	0	
50	Kai Caesar	14	14	14	28	7.0-46	5.5-41	0	1	3	0	1	1	0	
52	Bryce Dugan	11	14	12	26	3.0-14	1.0-9	1	0	2	0	1	0	0	
55	Rodney Mathews	14	11	15	26	7.0-21	1.5-7	0	0	5	0	1	0	0	
21	Austin Brawley	13	9	11	20	2.0-5	1.0-3	0	0	0	0	0	0	0	
28	Shane Bonner	14	5	9	14	2.5-20	2.0-20	0	0	1	0	0	0	0	
94	Bradley Weaver	6	8	6	14	0.5-1	0-0	0	1	1	2	0	0	0	
13	John Gregory	5	6	7	13	1.0-7	0.5-6	0	0	0	0	0	0	0	
34	Dylan Stevens	14	8	5	13	0-0	0-0	0	0	0	0	0	0	0	
18	Caden Campolieti	14	5	6	11	0.5-1	0-0	0	0	0	0	0	0	0	
97	Rayyan Buell	9	4	5	9	2.0-14	2.0-14	0	1	2	0	0	1	0	
9	Kylen Mccracken	14	1	7	8	0-0	0-0	0	1	1	0	0	0	0	
6	Dontay Hunter ii	9	4	3	7	1.5-3	0-0	0	0	0	0	0	0	0	
44	Jeremiah Burton	7	2	4	6	1.5-6	1.5-6	0	0	2	0	0	0	0	
81	Bralen Henderson	5	2	2	4	0.5-2	0-0	0	0	0	0	0	0	0	
0	Denzel Daxon	12	2	1	3	0-0	0-0	0	0	0	0	0	0	0	
12	Tyler Mullins	5	1	2	3	0-0	0-0	0	0	0	0	0	0	0	
23	Quintell Quinn	10	2	1	3	0-0	0-0	0	0	0	0	0	0	0	
86	Tyler Foster	13	1	1	2	0-0	0-0	0	0	0	0	0	0	0	
76	Hagen Meservy	13	2	0	2	0-0	0-0	0	0	0	0	0	0	0	
39	Mekah Ryder	4	1	1	2	0-0	0-0	0	0	0	0	0	0	0	
10	Giovonni Scales	2	1	1	2	0-0	0-0	0	0	0	0	0	0	0	
35	Shay Taylor	13	1	1	2	0-0	0-0	0	0	0	0	0	0	0	
25	Tristian Vandenberg	14	1	1	2	0-0	0-0	0	0	0	0	0	0	0	
66	Christophe Atkinson	12	1	0	1	0-0	0-0	0	0	0	0	0	0	0	
18	James Bostic	14	1	0	1	0-0	0-0	0	0	0	0	0	0	0	
15	Philip Cole	12	0	1	1	0-0	0-0	0	0	0	0	0	0	0	
31	Justin Holloway	14	0	1	1	0-0	0-0	0	0	0	0	0	0	0	
87	Will Kacmarek	14	1	0	1	0-0	0-0	0	0	0	0	0	0	0	
24	Cam Mccullum	1	1	0	1	0-0	0-0	0	0	0	0	0	0	0	
95	Dane Middlebrook	2	0	1	1	0-0	0-0	0	0	0	0	0	0	0	
2	Nife Oseni	12	1	0	1	0-0	0-0	0	0	0	0	0	0	0	
7	Kurtis Rourke	11	1	0	1	0-0	0-0	0	0	0	0	0	0	0	
42	Michael Taylor	6	0	1	1	0-0	0-0	0	0	1	0	0	0	0	
12	Sam Wiglusz	14	1	0	1	0-0	0-0	0	0	0	0	0	0	0	
22	Sieh Bangura	12	0	0	0	0-0	0-0	0	0	0	0	0	0	0	
19	Miles Cross	14	0	0	0	0-0	0-0	0	0	0	0	0	0	0	
10	Cj Harris	7	0	0	0	0-0	0-0	0	0	0	0	0	0	0	
8	Jacoby Jones	14	0	0	0	0-0	0-0	0	0	0	0	0	0	0	
21	Nolan Mccormick	13	0	0	0	0-0	0-0	0	0	0	0	0	0	0	
36	Jake Neatherton	6	0	0	0	0-0	0-0	0	0	0	0	0	0	0	
TM	Team	14	0	0	0	0-0	0-0	0	0	0	0	0	0	1	
37	Tyler Toledo	7	0	0	0	0-0	0-0	0	0	0	0	0	0	0	
90	Nathanial Vakos	14	0	0	0	0-0	0-0	0	0	0	0	0	0	0	
3	Keegan Wilburn	13	0	0	0	0-0	0-0	0	0	0	0	0	0	0	
	Total	14	521	430	951	92.0-403	36.0-260	12	53	56	10	15	2	1	1
	Opponents	14	481	566	1047	76.0-301	25.0-188	5	46	69	8	12	0	1	

Key: POS: Position, SOLO: Solo Tackles, AST: Assisted Tackles, TOT: Total Tackles, TFL: Tackles-for-loss, SACK: Quarterback Sacks, INT: Interceptions, BU: Passes Broken Up, PD: Passes Defended, QBH: Quarterback Hits, FR: Fumbles Recovered, FF: Forced Fumbles, BLK: Kicks or Punts Blocked, SAF: Safeties, TD : Touchdown

==== Special teams ====
Kicking statistics
#	NAME	GP	XPM	XPA	XP%	FGM	FGA	FG%	1–19	20–29	30–39	40–49	50+	LNG
90	Nathanial Vakos	14	49	50	98.0%	22	27	81.48%	0/0	9/9	8/9	3/5	2/4	56
	TOTALS		49	50	98.0%	22	27	81.48%	0/0	9/9	8/9	3/5	2/4	56

Kickoff statistics
#	NAME	GP	KICKS	YDS	AVG	TB	OB
25	Tristian Vandenberg	14	87	5237	60.2	32	2
	TOTALS		87	5237	60.2	32	2

Punting statistics
#	NAME	GP	PUNTS	YDS	AVG	LONG	TB	I–20	50+	BLK
43	Jack Wilson		43	1601	37.23	54	2	20	5	0
49	Jonah Wieland		16	621	38.81	51	0	3	1	0
	TOTALS		59	2222	37.66	54	2	23	6	0

Kick return statistics
#	NAME	GP	RTNS	YDS	AVG	TD	LNG
3	Keegan Wilburn	-	31	734	23.68	1	98
8	Jacoby Jones	-	12	225	18.75	0	30
12	Sam Wiglusz	-	4	61	15.25	0	21
15	Philip Cole	-	2	33	16.50	0	18
23	Miles Cross	-	2	20	10.00	0	20
48	Kyle Kelly	-	3	19	6.33	0	14
23	Julian Ross	-	1	17	17.00	0	17
14	Bryce Butler	-	1	6	6.00	0	6
	TOTALS		56	1115	19.91	1	98

Punt return statistics
#	NAME	GP	RTNS	YDS	AVG	TD	LONG
12	Sam Wiglusz	-	12	32	2.67	0	8
4	Ty Walton	-	3	-1	-0.33	0	2
	TOTALS		15	31	2.07	0	8

== Personnel ==
=== Coaching staff ===
Since July 14, 2021, the head coach of the Ohio Bobcats had been Tim Albin. He heads a staff of ten assistant coaches, four graduate assistants, a director of football operations, a director of recruiting & player personnel, and an assistant director of player personnel

Name	Position	Years at Ohio	Alma mater
Tim Albin	Head coach	2005	Northwestern Oklahoma State University 1989
Spence Nowinsky	Defensive coordinator/defensive ends	2022	Minnesota State University, Mankato 1994
Scott Isphording	Offensive coordinator/quarterbacks	2014	Hanover College 1994
Allen Rudolph	Co-offensive coordinator/offensive line	2019	University of Southern Mississippi 1995
Dwayne Dixon	Wide receivers	2007	University of Florida 1985
Tremayne Scott	Defensive tackles	2018	Ohio University 2012
John Hauser	Safeties	2022	Wittenberg University 2002
Brian Smith	Running backs and passing game coordinator	2022	University of Hawaii 2002
DeAngelo Smith	Cornerbacks/Director of player development	2017	University of Cincinnati 2008
Nate Faanes	Special teams coordinator/linebackers	2019	Winona State University 2015
Brian Metz	Tight ends	2020	University of Notre Dame 2013
Jeremiah Covington	Assistant athletic director for football operations	2022	Wingate University 2011
Kyle Pollack	Director of recruiting & video operations	2020	Penn State University
Thomas Turnbaugh	Director of video and recruiting services	2018	Ohio University
Jake Miller	Director of strength and conditioning	2021	Baker University
Matthias Reiber	Head football athletic trainer	2021	Bowling Green State University
Zoe Stoker	Recruiting & operations assistant		
Ryan Kalukin	Recruiting & operations assistant		
Nick Arleo	Graduate assistant – defense		
Luke Nardo	Graduate assistant – defense		
Kenny Zamberlin	Graduate assistant – offense		
Kyle Obly	Graduate assistant – offense		
Clay Finney	Student coach		
Elaine Goodfellow	Administrative assistant		

`

=== Roster ===
2022 Ohio Bobcats football roster

Quarterback

- 5 Kadin Beler – R-Sophomore (6'1") Phoenix, Ariz. / Arcadia
- 7 Kurtis Rourke – R-Junior (6'3") Oakville, Ontario, Canada / Holy Trinity
- 9 Callum Wither – freshman (6'3") Mississauga, Ontario / Clarkson Football North
- 10 CJ Harris – R-Sophomore (6'3") West Bloomfield, Mich. / West Bloomfield
- 13 Parker Navarro – R-Freshman (6'0") Tempe, Ariz. / Desert Vista

Running back

- 0 O'Shaan Allison – R-Senior (5'10") Malvern, Pa. / Malvern Prep
- 6 Quintell Quinn – sophomore (6'1") Columbus, Ohio / St. Francis DeSales High School
- 21 Nolan McCormick – sophomore (5'10") / Mason, Ohio / Wiliam Mason
- 22 Sieh Bangura – sophomore (6'0'") Bowie, Md. / Dematha Catholic High School
- 23 Julian Ross – Red 5th (5'11") Kansas City, Mo. / Staley
- 26 Bryce Kitrell – R-Sophomore (5'10") Ashland, Neb. / Ashland-Greenwood
- 36 Jake Neatherton – 6th (5'10") Miamisburg, Oh. / Miamisburg
- 37 Tyler Toledo – R-Sophomore (5'9") / Canal Winchester / Canal Winchester
- 41 Devon Hunter – freshman (5'10") / Avon, Ohio Avon / Ball State

Wide receiver

- 3 Keegan Wilburn – R-Freshman (5'9") Nelsonville, Ohio / Nelsonville-York
- 4 Tyler Walton – R-Senior (5'9") St. Louis, Mo. / Christian Brothers
- 8 Jacoby Jones – junior (6'1") Tunica, Mississippi / NW Mississippi CC
- 11 Rodney Harris – freshman (6'2") Cincinnati, Ohio / Princeton
- 12 Sam Wiglusz – Grad. (5'11") Brecksville, Ohio / Brecksville
- 15 Philip Cole – R-Senior (5'8") Columbus, Ohio / Bishop Hartley
- 16 Isaiah Davis – sophomore (6'3") Apopka, Fla. / Wekiva High School
- 17 Nigel Drummond II – R-Junior (5'10") Cleveland, Ohio / Saint Ignatius
- 18 James Bostic – Grad. (6'2") Fort Lauderdale, Fla. / Cardinal Gibbons
- 19 Miles Cross – sophomore (6'1") Bowie, Md. / Rock Hill High School (S.C.)
- 30 Carson Gebeau – freshman (6'0") Kenston, Ohio / Kenston
- 31 Major Brown – Grad. (6'1") / Gahanna, Ohio / Gahanna
- 42 Donte Cruz – freshman (6'3") / Pittsfield, Mass. Pittsfield
- 80 Ryan McDole – freshman (6'4") Cincinnati, Ohio / Turpin
- 81 Aramoni Rhone – sophomore (6'5") Orlando, Fla. / Plant City High School
- 83 Will Futhey – freshman (6'5") Waverly City, Ohio / Waverly
- 88 Caleb Gossett – R-Freshman (6'3") Lewis Center, Ohio / Dayton

Tight end

- 2 Alec Burton – R-Senior (6'4") Danville, Ind. / Danville
- 14 Bryce Butler – sophomore (6'3") Bowie, Md. / St. John's College High School
- 83 Kyle Fullam – freshman (6'5") Vandalia, Ohio / Butler
- 83 Michael Molnar – freshman (6'5") Mason, Ohio / Mason
- 86 Tyler Foster – R-Junior (6'5") Pickerington, Ohio / Pickerington
- 87 Will Kacmarek – sophomore (6'6") St. Louis, Mo. / Mary Institute and Saint Louis Country Day School

Offensive lineman

- 51 Davion Weatherspoon – sophomore (6'1") Harper Woods, Mich. / Harper Woods High School
- 53 Jay Amburgey – R-Junior (6'4") Reynoldsburg, Ohio / Reynoldsburg
- 54 Joe Oakes – R-Junior (6'2") Cincinnati, Ohio / Indian Hill
- 55 Vance Van Every – junior (6'2") Hernando, Mississippi / NW Mississippi CC
- 58 Bryce Ramer – R-Senior (6'4") Beaver, Pa. / Beaver Area
- 60 Demond Arter – R-Sophomore (6'4") Elkridge, Md. / St. John's (Washington DC)
- 61 Kaden Rogers – sophomore (6'3") Hamilton, Ohio / Ross High School
- 64 Shedrick Rhodes Jr. – R-Sophomore (6'4") McDonough, Ga. / Eagle's Landing Christian Academy
- 65 Jake Skelly – sophomore (6'4") Columbus, Ohio / Bishop Harley High School
- 66 Christophe Atkinson – R-Junior (6'3") Leesburg, Va. / Tuscarora
- 66 Kam Wright – freshman (6'4") Granville, Ohio / Granville
- 69 Parker Titsworth – R-Junior (6'1") Wexford, Pa. / North Allegheny
- 71 Aidan MacDonald – R-Junior (6'3") Chardon, Ohio / Notre Dame-Cathedral Latin
- 72 Kurt Danneker – R-Senior (6'3") Linden, Pa. / Williamsport Area
- 73 Joseph Habinowski – R-Sophomore (6'5") Pembroke Pines, Fla. / Chaminade-Madonna College Preparatory
- 74 Joseph Watson – freshman () / Unioto, Ohio / Unioto
- 74 Jarian Shelby – freshman (6'3") Luling, La. / Hahnville
- 76 Hagen Meservy – Red 5th (6'3") Tulsa, Okla. / Jenks
- 77 Jacob Dennison – R-Sophomore (6'5") Mansfield, Ohio / Lexington
- 79 Brody Rodgers – Grad. (6'4") Athens, Ohio / Athens

Placekicker

- 25 Tristian Vandenberg – R-Junior (6'4") Buffalo, N.Y. / Canisius
- 90 Nathanial Vakos – Freshamn (6'1") Avon, Ohio / Avon

Defensive lineman

- 0 Denzel Daxon – R-Senior (6'2") Nassau, Bahamas / Carol City (Fla.)
- 6 Dontay Hunter II – R-Sophomore () /
- 9 Kylen McCracken – R-Senior (6'3") Cleveland Heights, Ohio / Cleveland Heights
- 15 David Patterson – sophomore (6'3") Lilburn, Ga. / Parkview High School
- 16 Chris Mayfield – R-Sophomore (6'2") Hilliard, Ohio / Hilliard Bradley
- 17 Vonnie Watkins – R-Senior (6'3") Lusby, Md. / Patuxent
- 28 Shane Bonner – R-Senior (5'11") New Concord, Ohio / John Glenn
- 40 Jack McCrory – R-Senior (6'1") Springfield, Ohio / Springfield Shawnee
- 42 Michael Taylor – R-Senior (6'2") Rockville Centre, N.Y. / Holy Cross
- 44 Jeremiah Burton – R-Junior (6'1") Reynoldsburg, Ohio / Reynoldsburg
- 50 Kai Caesar – Grad. (6'1") Cache, Okla. / Cache
- 51 Griffin Davies – R-Junior (6'2") Elyria, Ohio / Elyria Catholic
- 52 Bryce Dugan – R-Senior (6'1") Milford, Ohio / Milford
- 55 Rodney Mathews – R-Senior (6'2") Memphis, Tenn. / Craigmont
- 57 Langston Cross – Grad. (6'2") Bowie, Md. C.H. Flowers / Towson / Middle Tennessee State
- 89 Kalos Farrier – R-Sophomore () /
- 90 Bralen Henderson – sophomore (6'3") Pittsburgh, Pa. / Central Catholic High School
- 91 Aiden Malenchek – R-Junior (6'5") Twinsburg, Ohio / Twinsburg
- 94 Bradley Weaver – sophomore (6'4") Hilliard, Ohio / Hilliard Darby High School
- 95 Dane Middlebrook – R-Sophomore (6'0") Indianapolis, Ind. / Brownsburg
- 96 Bryce Stai – R-Senior (6'2") Lincoln, Neb. / Norris
- 97 Rayyan Buell – R-Sophomore (6'2") Hornell, N.Y. /
- 98 Jordan Jones – R-Senior (6'2") Ashland, KY / Paul G. Blazar
- 99 Joey Woolard – R-Sophomore (6'1") Grove City, Ohio / Grove City

Linebacker

- 18 Caden Campolieti – R-Junior (6'1") Cleveland, Ohio / Saint Ignatius
- 29 CJ Hankins – R-Freshamn (5'11") Lakewood, Ohio / St. Edward
- 32 Bryce Houston – R-Senior (5'11") Lewis Center, Ohio / Olentangy Orange
- 33 Cannon Blauser – R-Junior (6'1") Hilliard, Ohio / Hilliard Bradley
- 34 Dylan Stevens – R-Sophomore (5'10") Powell, Ohio / Olentangy Liberty
- 35 Shay Taylor – sophomore (6'3") Mount Perry, Ohio / Sheridan High School
- 38 Keye Thompson – R-Senior (6'0") Barberton, Ohio / Barberton
- 46 Jayden Spires – R-Sophomore (6'1") Jackson, Ohio / Jackson
- 48 Kyle Kelly – R-Junior (6'1") Newport, Ky. / Newport Central Catholic

Defensive back

- 2 Nife Oseni – R-Sophomore () Rolling Meadows, Ill. / Rolling Meadows
- 3 Jeremiah Wood – R-Senior (6'0") Pickerington, Ohio / Pickerington Central
- 4 Roman Parodie – R-Sophomore (6'1") Fort Lauderdale, Fla. / Cardinal Gibbons
- 5 Jamison Collier – R-Senior (6'1") Snellville, Ga. / Brookwood
- 7 Torrie Cox, Jr. – sophomore (5'9") Miami Gardens, Fla. / | Chaminade-Madonna Preparatory School
- 8 Justin Birchette – R-Senior (5'10") Palm Beach Gardens, Fla. / Dwyer
- 10 Giovonni Scales – sophomore (6'1") Columbus, Ohio / Marion-Franklin High School
- 11 Tariq Drake – Grad. (6'0") Leavittsburg, Ohio / LaBrae
- 12 Tyler Mullins – junior (5'11") Grovetown, Georgia / Coffeyville CC
- 13 John Gregory – R-Senior (6'1") Indian Land, S.C. / Indian Land
- 14 John Motton – sophomore (5'11") Groveport, Ohio / Groveport-Madison High School
- 19 Zach Sanders – Grad. (5'11") Lawrence, Kan. / Lawrence Free State
- 20 Alvin Floyd – Grad. (5'10") North Miami Beach, Fla. / North Miami Beach
- 21 Austin Brawley – freshman (5'10") Massillon, Ohio / Massillon Washington
- 22 Adonis Williams Jr. – freshman (6'2") South Euclid, Ohio / Cleveland Heights
- 24 Cam McCullum – junior (5'11") Greenville, Mississippi / East Mississippi CC
- 25 Chris Kammerer – freshman () / Cincinnati, Ohio / Elder
- 27 Jack Fries – freshman () / Cincinnati, Ohio /
- 30 Ben Johnson – R-Junior (6'1") Pickerington, Ohio / Pickerington North
- 36 Cam Dorsey – R-Sophomore (6'0") Alpharetta, Ga. / Alpharetta
- 37 Xander Karagosian – Fr (6'1") Jackson, Ohio / Jackson
- 39 Mekah Ryder – freshman (6'1") McKinney Tex. / McKinney
- 47 Bailey Russ – R-Freshman (6'1") Cuyahoga Falls, Ohio / Walsh Jesuit

Punter

- 43 Jack Wilson – R-Sophomore (5'10") Lancefield, Victoria, Australia / Gisborne Secondary College (ProKick Australia)
- 49 Jonah Wieland – Red 5th (6'1") Hudson, Ohio / Hudson

Long snapper

- 31 Justin Holloway – R-Senior (6'3") Venice, Fla. / Venice
- 45 Ben Bergfeld – freshman () / Davenport, Iowa / Davenport North

=== Depth chart ===
Defense

FS
Alvin Floyd
Ben Johnson
-

NICKEL	WLB	MLB
Zack Sanders	Bryce Houston	Keye Thompson
Kyle Kelly	Kyle Kelly	Cannon Blauser
-	-	-

SS
Tariq Drake
Austin Brawley
John Motton

CB
Justin Birchette
Mekah Ryder
Tyler Mullins

DE	DT	DT	DE
Vonnie Watkins	Kai Caesar	Rodney Mathews	Jack McCrory
Bryce Dugan	Kylen McCracken	Rayyan Buell	Shane Bonner
-	Denzel Daxon	Bryce Dugan	-

CB
Torrie Cox, Jr.
Roman Parodie
-

Offense

WR-F
Sam Wiglusz
Keegan Wilburn
Philip Cole

WR-X
James Bostic
Jacoby Jones
Aramoni Rhone

LT	LG	C	RG	RT
Jay Amburgey	Kurt Danneker	Parker Titsworth	Hagen Meservy	Shedrick Rhodes Jr.
Joseph Habinowski	Bryce Ramer	Vance Van Every	Christophe Atkinson	Demond Arter
-	-	-	-	-

TE
Tyler Foster
Will Kacmarek
Alec Burton
Bryce Butler

WR-Z
Miles Cross
Nigel Drummond II
Caleb Gossett

QB
CJ Harris
Kadin Beler
Callum Wither
-

RB
Sieh Bangura
Nolan McCormick
Julian Ross
Jake Neatherton

Special teams
PK Nathanial Vakos
Tristian Vandenberg
P Jack Wilson
Jonah Wieland
KR Keegan Wilburn
Jacoby Jones
PR Sam Wiglusz
Torrie Cox Jr.
LS Justin Holloway
Ben Bergfeld

For Arizona Bowl - Source:

== Awards and honors ==
=== Weekly awards ===
Award	Player	Position	Year	Date	Source
MAC East Offensive Player of the Week	Kurtis Rourke	QB	R-Jr.	Sept. 5	
MAC East Special Teams Player of the Week	Nathanial Vakos	K	Fr.	Sept. 5	
MAC East Offensive Player of the Week	Kurtis Rourke	QB	R-Jr.	Sept. 26	
MAC East Special Teams Player of the Week	Tristian Vandenberg	K	R-Jr.	Oct. 3	
MAC East Offensive Player of the Week	Sieh Bangura	RB	R-Fr.	Oct. 10	
MAC East Offensive Player of the Week	Sieh Bangura	RB	R-Fr.	Oct. 17	
MAC East Special Teams Player of the Week	Nathanial Vakos	K	Fr.	Oct. 17	
MAC East Offensive Player of the Week	Kurtis Rourke	QB	R-Jr.	Nov. 7	
MAC East Defensive Player of the Week	Keye Thompson	LB	Sr.	Nov. 7	
MAC East Defensive Player of the Week	Alvin Floyd	S	Sr.	Nov. 21	
MAC East Offensive Player of the Week	CJ Harris	QB	R-So.	Nov. 28	
MAC East Defensive Player of the Week	Keye Thompson	LB	Sr.	Nov. 28	
Arizona Bowl MVP	CJ Harris	QB	R-So.	Dec. 30	

=== Midseason Award watch lists ===
Award	Player	Position	Year
Manning Award	Kurtis Rourke	QB	Jr.
Davey O'Brien Award	Kurtis Rourke	QB	Jr.
Wuerffel Trophy	Kai Caeser	DL	Grad.
CFPA National Performer of the Year Trophy	Kurtis Rourke	QB	Jr.

=== Award Finalists ===
Award	Player	Position	Year
Jon Cornish Trophy	Kurtis Rourke	QB	Jr.

=== All-MAC awards ===
Postseason All-MAC teams
Award	Player	Position	Year
MAC Coach of the Year	Tim Albin	Head Coach	
Vern Smith Leadership Award (Player of the Year)	Kurtis Rourke	Quarterback	R-Jr.
MAC Offensive Player of the Year	Kurtis Rourke	Quarterback	R-Jr.
MAC Freshman of the Year	Sieh Bangura	Running Back	R-Fr.
All-MAC First Team Offense	Kurtis Rourke	Quarterback	R-Jr.
All-MAC First Team Offense	Hagen Meservy	Offensive Line	6th
All-MAC First Team Offense	Sam Wiglusz	Wide Receiver	GS
2022 All-MAC First Team Specialists	Keegan Wilburn	Kick Returner	R-Jr.
2022 All-MAC Second Team Offense	Nathanial Vakos	Placekicker	Fr.
2022 All-MAC Third Team Offense	Sieh Bangura	Running Back	R-Fr.
2022 All-MAC Third Team Defense	Jack McCrory	Down Lineman	R-Sr.
2022 All-MAC Third Team Defense	Keye Thompson	Linebacker	R-Sr.
2022 All-MAC Third Team Defense	Tariq Drake	Defensive Back	GS

=== National awards ===
National Award Honors
Honors	Player	Position	Ref.
CFN Third Team Freshman All-American	Torrie Cox, Jr.	CB	
CFN Third Team Freshman All-American	Nathanial Vakos	K	
CFN Honorable Mention Freshman All-American	Sieh Bangura	RB	

== Rankings ==
Ranking movements Legend: ██ Increase in ranking ██ Decrease in ranking — = Not ranked RV = Received votes
	Week															
Poll	Pre	1	2	3	4	5	6	7	8	9	10	11	12	13	14	Final
AP	—	—	—	—	—	—	—	—	—	—	—	—	—	RV	—	—
Coaches	—	—	—	—	—	—	—	—	—	—	—	—	—	—	—	RV
CFP	Not released									—	—	—	—	—	—	Not released
