= 2022 Northern Illinois Huskies football team =

American college football season

2022 Northern Illinois Huskies football
- Conference: Mid-American Conference
- West Division
- Record: 3–9 (2–6 MAC)
- Head coach: Thomas Hammock (4th season)
- Offensive coordinator: Eric Eidsness (4th season)
- Offensive scheme: Multiple
- Defensive coordinator: Derrick Jackson (4th season)
- Co-defensive coordinator: Nick Benedetto (1st season)
- Base defense: 4–2–5
- Home stadium: Huskie Stadium

2022 Mid-American Conference football standings
	Conf.			Overall
Team	W		L	W		L
East Division
Ohio xy	7	–	1	10	–	4
Buffalo	5	–	3	7	–	6
Bowling Green	5	–	3	6	–	7
Miami (OH)	4	–	4	6	–	7
Kent State	4	–	4	5	–	7
Akron	1	–	7	2	–	10
West Division
Toledo xy$	5	–	3	9	–	5
Eastern Michigan x	5	–	3	9	–	4
Western Michigan	4	–	4	5	–	7
Ball State	3	–	5	5	–	7
Central Michigan	3	–	5	4	–	8
Northern Illinois	2	–	6	3	–	9
Championship: Toledo 17, Ohio 7
$ – Conference champion; x – Division champion/co-champions; y – Championship game participant; Rankings from AP Poll

The 2022 Northern Illinois Huskies football team represented Northern Illinois University as a member of the West Division of the Mid-American Conference (MAC) during the 2022 NCAA Division I FBS football season. The Huskies were led by fourth-year head coach Thomas Hammock and played their home games at Huskie Stadium in DeKalb, Illinois. The Huskies drew an average attendance of 9,198.

The Huskies hoped to build off their previous season as the defending MAC champions, which started off with a 34-27 win at home against FCS Eastern Illinois before their season derailed after starting quarterback Rocky Lombardi suffered an undisclosed injury during a game against Vanderbilt. NIU juggled between quarterbacks Ethan Hampton and Nevan Cremascoli for the remainder of the season and finished 3-9 overall with a 2-6 record in conference play, placing NIU last in the MAC West Division.

== Preseason ==
In the league's annual preseason poll, the Huskies were picked to win the West division. They were also picked to win the MAC Championship. Offensive linemen Nolan Porter and Logan Zschernitz, wide receiver Trayvon Rudolph, cornerback Jordan Gandy, and kicker John Richardson were named to the preseason first team. Offensive lineman Marques Cox and safety C.J. Brown were named to the second team.

== Schedule ==
The Huskies played four non-conference games with visits to Tulsa and Kentucky and while hosting Eastern Illinois of the FCS and Vanderbilt at Huskie Stadium.

Date	Time	Opponent	Site	TV	Result	Attendance
September 1	7:00 p.m.	Eastern Illinois*	Huskie Stadium; DeKalb, IL	ESPN+	W 34–27	10,864
September 10	6:00 p.m.	at Tulsa*	Skelly Field at H. A. Chapman Stadium; Tulsa, OK	ESPN+	L 35–38	22,113
September 17	2:30 p.m.	Vanderbilt*	Huskie Stadium; DeKalb, IL	CBSSN	L 28–38	14,110
September 24	6:00 p.m.	at No. 8 Kentucky*	Kroger Field; Lexington, KY	ESPN2	L 23–31	61,579
October 1	1:00 p.m.	at Ball State	Scheumann Stadium; Muncie, IN (Bronze Stalk Trophy)	ESPN+	L 38–44 ^{2OT}	10,012
October 8	2:30 p.m.	Toledo^{†}	Huskie Stadium; DeKalb, IL	ESPN+	L 32–52	12,682
October 15	2:30 p.m.	at Eastern Michigan	Rynearson Stadium; Ypsilanti, MI	ESPN+	W 39–10	15,100
October 22	1:00 p.m.	at Ohio	Peden Stadium; Athens, OH	ESPN+	L 17–24	15,922
November 2	6:00 p.m.	Central Michigan	Huskie Stadium; DeKalb, IL	ESPNU	L 22–35	6,055
November 9	6:00 p.m.	at Western Michigan	Waldo Stadium; Kalamazoo, MI	ESPNU	W 24–21	8,722
November 16	6:00 p.m.	Miami (OH)	Huskie Stadium; DeKalb, IL	CBSSN	L 23–29	5,187
November 26	12:30 p.m.	Akron	Huskie Stadium; DeKalb, IL	ESPN3	L 12–44	6,288
*Non-conference game; ^{†}Homecoming; Rankings from AP Poll and CFP Rankings (after November 3) released prior to game; All times are in Central time

== Game summaries ==
=== Eastern Illinois ===
	1	2	3	4	Total
Panthers	3	3	7	14	27
Huskies	7	14	7	6	34

=== at Tulsa ===
Game Two – Northern Illinois Huskies (1–0) at Tulsa Golden Hurricane (0–1)

Quarter	1	2	3	4	Total
Huskies	0	7	14	14	35
Golden Hurricane	7	17	0	14	38

at Skelly Field at H. A. Chapman Stadium • Tulsa, OK

- Date: Saturday, September 10, 2022
- Game time: 6:00 p.m. CST
- Game weather: Sunny • Temperature: 88 °F (31 °C) • Wind: NW 5
- Game attendance: 22,113
- Referee: Jeremy Valentine
- TV: ESPN+

Game information

First quarter

- (10:13) TLSA – JuanCarlos Santana 14 yard pass from Davis Brin, Zack Long kick (Drive: 12 plays, 75 yards, 4:47; Tulsa 7–0)

Second quarter

- (13:02) TLSA – Zack Long 28 yard field goal (Drive: 10 plays, 30 yards, 4:41; Tulsa 10–0)
- (8:15) TLSA – JuanCarlos Santana 25 yard pass from Davis Brin, Zack Long kick (Drive:8 plays, 71 yards, 3:11; Tulsa 17–0)
- (2:17) NIU – Kacper Rutkiewicz 9 yard pass from Rocky Lombardi, John Richardson kick (Drive: 6 plays, 44 yards, 2:50; Tulsa 17–7)
- (0:49) TLSA – Isaiah Epps 20 yard pass from Davis Brin, Zack Long kick (Drive: 4 plays, 69 yards, 1:22; Tulsa 24–7)

Third quarter

- (11:44) NIU – Kacper Rutkiewicz 30 yard pass from Rocky Lombardi, John Richardson kick (Drive: 6 plays, 75 yards, 3:16; Tulsa 24–14)
- (8:54) NIU – Antario Brown 8 yard run, John Richardson kick (Drive: 7 plays, 54 yards, 2:48; Tulsa 24–21)

Fourth quarter

- (14:50) NIU – Cole Tucker 33 yard pass from Rocky Lombardi, John Richardson kick (Drive: 8 plays, 78 yards, 4:18; Northern Illinois 28–24)
- (10:36) TLSA – Keylon Stokes 1 yard pass from Davis Brin, Zack Long kick (Drive: 10 plays, 75 yards, 4:14; Tulsa 31–28)
- (5:57) NIU – Rocky Lombardi 1 yard run, John Richardson kick (Drive: 7 plays, 40 yards, 3:40; Northern Illinois 35–31)
- (0:58) TLSA – Steven Anderson 1 yard run, Zack Long kick (Drive: 5 plays, 52 yards, 0:56; Tulsa 38–35)

Statistics	NIU	TLSA
First downs	19	23
Plays–yards	68–385	69–429
Rushes–yards	37–126	37–107
Passing yards	259	322
Passing: comp–att–int	18–31–1	19–32–1
Turnovers		
Time of possession	32:02	27:58

Team	Category	Player	Statistics
Northern Illinois	Passing	Rocky Lombardi	18/31, 259 yards, 3 TD, 1 INT
Northern Illinois	Rushing	Antario Brown	20 carries, 73 yards, 1 TD
Northern Illinois	Receiving	Cole Tucker	7 receptions, 123 yards, 1 TD
Tulsa	Passing	Davis Brin	19/32, 322 yards, 4 TD, 1 INT
Tulsa	Rushing	Steven Anderson	18 carries, 58 yards, 1 TD
Tulsa	Receiving	Keylon Stokes	8 receptions, 135 yards, 1 TD

=== Vanderbilt ===
	1	2	3	4	Total
Commodores	7	7	21	3	38
Huskies	7	14	7	0	28

Statistics

Statistics	VAN	NIU
First downs	21	17
Total yards	428	354
Rushing yards	173	151
Passing yards	255	203
Turnovers	1	1
Time of possession	30:39	29:21

Team	Category	Player	Statistics
Vanderbilt	Passing	AJ Swann	18/28, 255 yards, 4 TD
Vanderbilt	Rushing	Ray Davis	23 rushes, 116 yards, TD
Vanderbilt	Receiving	Will Sheppard	10 receptions, 171 yards, TD
Northern Illinois	Passing	Ethan Hampton	12/19, 124 yards, 2 TD, INT
Northern Illinois	Rushing	Antario Brown	8 rushes, 60 yards, TD
Northern Illinois	Receiving	Cole Tucker	4 receptions, 88 yards, 2 TD

=== at No. 8 Kentucky ===
Team	1	2	3	4	Total
NIU	7	7	0	9	23
• No. 8 Kentucky	7	7	10	7	31

- Date: September 24
- Location: Lexington, KY
- Game start: 7:05 p.m.
- Game attendance: 61,579
- Game weather: 71°F, Sunny, Wind SW @ 6 mph
- Referee: Steve Marlowe
- TV announcers (ESPN2): Anish Shroff (play-by-play), Brock Osweiler (color), Alex Chappell (sideline)

Statistics	NIU	Kentucky
First downs	14	18
Total yards	327	406
Rushing yards	128	103
Passing yards	199	303
Turnovers	0	1
Time of possession	26:17	33:43

Team	Category	Player	Statistics
NIU	Passing	Ethan Hampton	13/25, 196 yards, 1 TD
NIU	Rushing	Harrison Waylee	18 carries, 63 yards
NIU	Receiving	Kacper Rutkiewicz	1 reception, 63 yards
Kentucky	Passing	Will Levis	18/26, 303 yards, 4 TD’s
Kentucky	Rushing	Kavosiey Smoke	12 carries, 85 yards
Kentucky	Receiving	Tayvion Robinson	7 receptions, 147 yards, 2 TD’s

=== at Ball State ===
	1	2	3	4	OT	2OT	Total
Huskies	7	17	7	7	0	0	38
Cardinals	0	7	14	17	0	6	44

=== Toledo ===
	1	2	3	4	Total
Rockets	21	14	10	7	52
Huskies	7	0	0	25	32

=== at Eastern Michigan ===
	1	2	3	4	Total
Huskies	14	6	9	10	39
Eagles	7	0	3	0	10

=== at Ohio ===
Northern Illinois Huskies (2–5, 1–2) vs. Ohio Bobcats (4–3, 2–1)

Quarter	1	2	3	4	Total
Northern Illinois	0	6	11	0	17
Ohio	7	3	7	7	24

at Peden Stadium • Athens, OH

- Date: Saturday, October 23, 2022
- Game time: 2:00 p.m. EDT
- Game weather: sunny, Temperature:69 °F (21 °C)
- Game attendance: 15,922
- Referee: Greg Sujack
- TV announcers (ESPN+): Anthony Lima, Ryan Cavanaugh
- box score, Ohio notes

Game information

First Quarter

- (11:50) OHIO – Wiglusz, Sam 8 yd pass from Rourke, Kurtis (Vakos, Nathanial kick) 9 plays, 84 yards, TOP 03:49 (OHIO 7–0)

Second Quarter

- (10:49) NIU – Richardson, John 38 yd field goal 12 plays, 34 yards, TOP 05:48 (OHIO 7–3)
- (04:07) NIU – Richardson, John 27 yd field goal 10 plays, 67 yards, TOP 04:41 (OHIO 7–6)
- (00:19) OHIO – Vakos, Nathanial 31 yd field goal 7 plays, 61 yards, TOP 03:48 (OHIO 10–6)

Third Quarter

- (10:56) NIU – Richardson, John 45 yd field goal 9 plays, 48 yards, TOP 04:04 (OHIO 10–9)
- (04:16) OHIO – Rourke, Kurtis 1 yd run (Vakos, Nathanial kick) 13 plays, 81 yards, TOP 06:34 (OHIO 17–9)
- (01:31) NIU – Rutkiewicz, Kacper 11 yd run (Thornton, Shemar pass) 6 plays, 75 yards, TOP 02:45 (Tied 17–17)

Fourth Quarter

- (07:00) OHIO – Wiglusz, Sam 22 yd pass from Rourke, Kurtis (Vakos, Nathanial kick) 11 plays, 90 yards, TOP 04:26 (OHIO 24–17)

Statistics	NIU	OHIO
First downs	17	20
Total yards	377	354
Rushes/yards	48/267	33/154
Passing yards	110	200
Passing: Comp–Att–Int	9–18–0	14–26–0
Time of possession	32:30	27:30

Team	Category	Player	Statistics
Northern Illinois	Passing	Justin Lynch	9/18, 110 yards
Northern Illinois	Rushing	Antario Brown	16 carries, 160 yards
Northern Illinois	Receiving	Kacper Rutkiewicz	1 receptions, 41 yards
Ohio	Passing	Kurtis Rourke	14/26, 200 yards, 2 TD
Ohio	Rushing	Kurtis Rourke	7 carries, 61 yards, 1 TD
Ohio	Receiving	Sam Wiglusz	6 receptions, 69 yards, 2 TD

=== Central Michigan ===
	1	2	3	4	Total
Chippewas	14	7	7	7	35
Huskies	0	0	7	15	22

=== at Western Michigan ===
	1	2	3	4	Total
Huskies	3	7	7	7	24
Broncos	7	7	7	0	21

=== Miami (OH) ===
	1	2	3	4	Total
RedHawks	2	14	10	3	29
Huskies	10	0	13	0	23

=== Akron ===
	1	2	3	4	Total
Zips	0	20	7	17	44
Huskies	6	0	3	3	12
