= 2022 Central Michigan Chippewas football team =

American college football season

2022 Central Michigan Chippewas football
- Conference: Mid-American Conference
- West Division
- Record: 4–8 (3–5 MAC)
- Head coach: Jim McElwain (4th season)
- Offensive coordinator: Paul Petrino (1st season)
- Offensive scheme: Multiple
- Defensive coordinator: Robb Akey (4th season)
- Base defense: 4–3
- Home stadium: Kelly/Shorts Stadium

2022 Mid-American Conference football standings
| | Conf. | | | Overall |
| Team | W | | L | W | | L |
|---|---|---|---|---|---|---|
East Division
| Ohio xy | 7 | – | 1 | 10 | – | 4 |
| Buffalo | 5 | – | 3 | 7 | – | 6 |
| Bowling Green | 5 | – | 3 | 6 | – | 7 |
| Miami (OH) | 4 | – | 4 | 6 | – | 7 |
| Kent State | 4 | – | 4 | 5 | – | 7 |
| Akron | 1 | – | 7 | 2 | – | 10 |
West Division
| Toledo xy$ | 5 | – | 3 | 9 | – | 5 |
| Eastern Michigan x | 5 | – | 3 | 9 | – | 4 |
| Western Michigan | 4 | – | 4 | 5 | – | 7 |
| Ball State | 3 | – | 5 | 5 | – | 7 |
| Central Michigan | 3 | – | 5 | 4 | – | 8 |
| Northern Illinois | 2 | – | 6 | 3 | – | 9 |
Championship: Toledo 17, Ohio 7
$ – Conference champion; x – Division champion/co-champions; y – Championship game participant; Rankings from AP Poll

The 2022 Central Michigan Chippewas football team represented Central Michigan University in the 2022 NCAA Division I FBS football season. They were led by fourth-year head coach Jim McElwain and play their home games at Kelly/Shorts Stadium as members of the West Division of the Mid-American Conference.

== Schedule ==
| Date | Time | Opponent | Site | TV | Result | Attendance |
|---|---|---|---|---|---|---|
| September 1 | 7:00 p.m. | at No. 12 Oklahoma State* | Boone Pickens Stadium; Stillwater, OK | FS1 | L 44–58 | 53,808 |
| September 10 | 1:00 p.m. | South Alabama* | Kelly/Shorts Stadium; Mount Pleasant, MI | ESPN+ | L 28–34 | 17,205 |
| September 17 | 1:00 p.m. | Bucknell* | Kelly/Shorts Stadium; Mount Pleasant, MI | ESPN3 | W 41–0 | 21,554 |
| September 24 | 12:00 p.m. | at No. 14 Penn State* | Beaver Stadium; University Park, PA | BTN | L 14–33 | 106,624 |
| October 1 | 3:30 p.m. | at Toledo | Glass Bowl; Toledo, OH | NFLN | L 17–38 | 22,273 |
| October 8 | 3:30 p.m. | Ball State^{†} | Kelly/Shorts Stadium; Mount Pleasant, MI | ESPN+ | L 16–17 | 22,305 |
| October 15 | 12:00 p.m. | at Akron | InfoCision Stadium–Summa Field; Akron, OH | ESPN+ | W 28–21 | 14,814 |
| October 22 | 1:00 p.m. | Bowling Green | Kelly/Shorts Stadium; Mount Pleasant, MI | ESPN3 | L 18–34 | 14,676 |
| November 2 | 7:00 p.m. | at Northern Illinois | Huskie Stadium; DeKalb, IL | ESPNU | W 35–22 | 6,055 |
| November 9 | 7:00 p.m. | Buffalo | Kelly/Shorts Stadium; Mount Pleasant, MI | ESPN2 | W 31–27 | 9,103 |
| November 16 | 8:00 p.m. | Western Michigan | Kelly/Shorts Stadium; Mount Pleasant, MI (rivalry) | ESPNU | L 10–12 | 10,097 |
| November 25 | 12:00 p.m. | at Eastern Michigan | Rynearson Stadium; Ypsilanti, MI (rivalry) | CBSSN | L 19–38 | 14,213 |
*Non-conference game; ^{†}Homecoming; Rankings from AP Poll released prior to the game; All times are in Eastern time

== Game summaries ==
=== At No. 12 Oklahoma State ===
Central Michigan Chippewas (0–0) vs. Oklahoma State Cowboys (0–0)

| Quarter | 1 | 2 | 3 | 4 | Total |
|---|---|---|---|---|---|
| Central Michigan | 7 | 8 | 7 | 22 | 44 |
| No. 12 Oklahoma State | 16 | 28 | 7 | 7 | 58 |

at Boone Pickens Stadium • Stillwater, OK

- Date: Thursday, September 1, 2022
- Game time: 6:00 p.m. CDT
- Game weather: • Cloudy Temperature: 78
- Game attendance: 53,808
- Referee: Stuart Mullins
- TV announcers (FS1): Jason Benetti (play-by-play) & Brock Huard (analyst)

Game information

First Quarter

- (10:09) OSU – Spencer Sanders 45 yard pass to John Paul Richardson, Tanner Brown kick (Drive: 6 plays, 75 yards, 1:32; OSU 7–0)
- (7:05) CMU – Daniel Richardson 15 yard pass to Carlos Carriere, Marshall Meeder kick (Drive: 8 plays, 75 yards, 3:04; Tied 7–7)
- (0:55) OSU – Safety (OSU 9—7)
- (0:00) OSU – Spencer Sanders 17 yard rush, Tanner Brown kick (Drive:4 plays, 70 yards, 0:50; OSU 16–7)

Second Quarter

- (11:32) OSU – Spencer Sanders 13 yard pass to Braydon Johnson, Tanner Brown kick (Drive: 5 plays, 59 yards, 1:17; OSU 23–7)
- (7:14) OSU – Spencer Sanders 17 yard pass to Jaden Nixon, Tanner Brown kick (Drive: 7 plays, 57 yards, 1:55; OSU 30–7)
- (4:32) OSU – Spencer Sanders 23 yard rush, Tanner Brown kick (Drive: 5 plays, 51 yards, 1:01; OSU 37–7)
- (0:43) CMU – Lew Nichols 4 yard rush, Daniel Richardson PAT pass to Jalen McGaughy (Drive: 10 plays, 75 yards, 3:49; OSU 37–15)
- (0:11) OSU – Dominic Richardson 1 yard rush, Tanner Brown kick (Drive: 3 plays, 75 yards, 0:32; OSU 44–15)

Third Quarter

- (14:23) OSU – Spencer Sanders 7 yard pass to Bryson Green, Tanner Brown kick (Drive: 2 plays, 52 yards, 0:29; OSU 51–15)
- (11:14) CMU – Daniel Richardson 1 yard pass to Jalen McGaughy; Marshal Meeder kick (Drive: 7 plays, 80 yards, 3:03; OSU 51–22)

Fourth Quarter

- (12:31) CMU – Daniel Richardson 18 yard pass to Myles Bailey, 2 pt conversion failed (Drive: 3 plays, 39 yards, 0:32; OSU 51–28)
- (9:17) OSU – Zach Middleton 1 yard rush, Tanner Brown kick (Drive: 7 plays, 71 yards, 3:09; OSU 58–28)
- (6:50) CMU – Lew Nichols 15 yard rush, Daniel Richardson PAT Pass to Carlos Carriere (Drive: 6 plays, 70 yards, 2:27; OSU 58–36)
- (3:15) CMU – Daniel Richardson 54 yard pass to Jalen McGaughy, Daniel Richardson PAT pass to Joel Wilson (Drive: 6 plays, 72 yards, 2:04; OSU 58–44)

| Statistics | CMU | OKST |
|---|---|---|
| First downs | 31 | 28 |
| Total yards | 546 | 531 |
| Rushes/yards | 39/122 | 32/125 |
| Passing yards | 424 | 406 |
| Passing: Comp–Att–Int | 36–49–1 | 28–41 |
| Time of possession | 36:08 | 23:52 |

| Team | Category | Player | Statistics |
|---|---|---|---|
| Central Michigan | Passing | Daniel Richardson | 36/49, 424 yards, 4 TD's 1 INT |
| Central Michigan | Rushing | Lew Nichols III | 26 carries, 72 yards, 2 TD's |
| Central Michigan | Receiving | Jalen McGaughy | 6 receptions, 126 yards, 2 TD's |
| Oklahoma State | Passing | Spencer Sanders | 28/41, 406 yards, 4 TD's |
| Oklahoma State | Rushing | Dominic Richardson | 9 carries, 61 yards, 1 TD |
| Oklahoma State | Receiving | Braydon Johnson | 6 receptions, 133 yards, 1 TD |

=== South Alabama ===
South Alabama Jaguars (1–0) at Central Michigan Chippewas (0–1)

| Quarter | 1 | 2 | 3 | 4 | Total |
|---|---|---|---|---|---|
| Jaguars | 20 | 11 | 0 | 7 | 38 |
| Chippewas | 7 | 3 | 0 | 14 | 24 |

at Kelly/Shorts Stadium, Mount Pleasant, MI

- Date: September 10, 2022
- Game time: 12:00 p.m. CDT
- Game weather: Sunny • Temperature: 79 °F (26 °C) • Wind: SW 11 mph
- Game attendance: 17,205
- Referee: Tom Stapleton
- TV announcers (ESPN+): Dan Gutowsky (play-by-play) and Marcus Ray (analyst)

Game information

First Quarter

- (8:51) USA – Carter Bradley 16-yard pass from Carter Bradley (Drive: 7 plays, 88 yards, 2:57; South Alabama 6–0)
- (5:08) CMU – Lew Nichols 5-yard run, Marshall Meeder kick (Drive: 4 plays, 63 yards, 1:08; Central Michigan 7–6)
- (1:29) USA – La'Damian Webb 3-yard run, Diego Guajardo kick (Drive: 10 plays, 65 yards, 2:29; South Alabama 13–7)
- (1:05) USA – Devin Voisin 22-yard pass from Carter Bradley, Diego Guajardo kick (Drive: 3 plays, 22 yards, 0:12; South Alabama 20–7)

Second Quarter

- (12:14) USA – Jalen Wayne 10-yard pass from Carter Bradley, Devin Voisin pass (Drive: 6 plays, 50 yards, 2:46; South Alabama 28–7)
- (5:47) USA – Diego Guajardo 36-yard field goal (Drive: 11 plays, 62 yards, 4:30; South Alabama 31–7)
- (1:21) CMU – Marshall Meeder 48-yard field goal (Drive: 6 plays, 25 yards, 0:51; South Alabama 31–10)

Third Quarter

No scoring plays

Fourth Quarter

- (10:53) USA – La'Damian Webb 30-yard run, Diego Guajardo kick (Drive: 6 plays, 61 yards, 2:06; South Alabama 38–10)
- (8:43) CMU – Marion Lukes 12-yard run (Drive: 9 plays, 75 yards, 2:10; South Alabama 38–16)
- (4:30) CMU – Joel Wilson 21-yard pass from Daniel Richardson, D.C. Temple pass (Drive: 10 plays, 82 yards, 2:09; South Alabama 38–24)

| Statistics | USA | CMU |
|---|---|---|
| First downs | 30 | 23 |
| Total yards | 502 | 338 |
| Rushing yards | 148 | 81 |
| Passing yards | 354 | 257 |
| Passing: Comp–Att–Int | 26–42–1 | 23–47–0 |
| Time of possession | 38:00 | 22:00 |

| Team | Category | Player | Statistics |
|---|---|---|---|
| South Alabama | Passing | Carter Bradley | 26/42, 354 yards, 3 TD, INT |
| South Alabama | Rushing | La'Damian Webb | 20 carries, 91 yards, 2 TD |
| South Alabama | Receiving | Jalen Wayne | 10 receptions, 98 yards, TD |
| Central Michigan | Passing | Daniel Richardson | 23/47, 257 yards, TD |
| Central Michigan | Rushing | Marion Lukes | 3 carries, 36 yards, TD |
| Central Michigan | Receiving | Joel Wilson | 7 receptions, 73 yards, TD |

=== Bucknell ===
| | 1 | 2 | 3 | 4 | Total |
|---|---|---|---|---|---|
| Bison | 0 | 0 | 0 | 0 | 0 |
| Chippewas | 0 | 7 | 13 | 21 | 41 |

=== At No. 14 Penn State ===
Central Michigan at No. 14 Penn State – Game summary

| Quarter | 1 | 2 | 3 | 4 | Total |
|---|---|---|---|---|---|
| Central Michigan | 0 | 14 | 0 | 0 | 14 |
| No. 14 Penn State | 14 | 7 | 6 | 6 | 33 |

at Beaver Stadium, University Park, Pennsylvania

- Date: September 24
- Game time: 12:00 noon EDT
- Game weather: 55 °F (13 °C), sunny
- Game attendance: 106,624
- Referee: Ron Snodgrass
- TV announcers (BTN): Mark Followill, Matt Millen, and Matt McGloin
- ESPN box score, GoPSUsports.com box score

Game information

First quarter

- PSU – Mitchell Tinsley, 5-yard TD pass from Sean Clifford, Jake Pinegar kick, 8:42 (7–0, PSU)
- PSU – Brenton Strange, 4-yard TD pass from Clifford, Pinegar kick, 6:38 (14–0, PSU)

Second quarter

- CMU – Finn Hogan, 2-yard TD pass from Daniel Richardson, Josh Rolston kick, 12:39 (14–7, PSU)
- CMU – Joel Wilson, 14-yard TD pass from Richardson, Rolston kick, 6:25 (14–14, TIE)
- PSU – Kaytron Allen, 14-yard TD run, Pinegar kick, 1:58 (21–14, PSU)

Third quarter

- PSU – Strange, 3-yard TD pass from Clifford, Pinegar kick blocked, 11:55 (27–14, PSU)

Fourth quarter

- PSU – Clifford, 1-yard TD run, 2-point conversion pass incomplete, 14:43 (33–14, PSU)

| Statistics | CMU | PSU |
|---|---|---|
| First downs | 20 | 21 |
| Plays–yards | 75–363 | 71–403 |
| Rushes–yards | 23–88 | 32–166 |
| Passing yards | 275 | 237 |
| Passing: comp–att–int | 29–52–2 | 24–39–0 |
| Turnovers | | |
| Time of possession | 29:33 | 30:27 |

| Team | Category | Player | Statistics |
|---|---|---|---|
| Central Michigan | Passing | Daniel Richardson | 26/45, 235 yards, 2 TD, 2 INT |
| Central Michigan | Rushing | Lew Nichols III | 13 carries, 67 yards |
| Central Michigan | Receiving | Carlos Carriere | 11 receptions, 111 yards |
| Penn State | Passing | Sean Clifford | 22/34, 217 yards, 3 TD |
| Penn State | Rushing | Kaytron Allen | 13 carries, 111 yards, TD |
| Penn State | Receiving | Parker Washington | 6 receptions, 64 yards |

=== At Toledo ===
| | 1 | 2 | 3 | 4 | Total |
|---|---|---|---|---|---|
| Chippewas | 3 | 0 | 8 | 6 | 17 |
| Rockets | 3 | 28 | 0 | 7 | 38 |

=== Ball State ===
| | 1 | 2 | 3 | 4 | Total |
|---|---|---|---|---|---|
| Cardinals | 0 | 7 | 7 | 3 | 17 |
| Chippewas | 10 | 0 | 6 | 0 | 16 |

=== At Akron ===
| | 1 | 2 | 3 | 4 | Total |
|---|---|---|---|---|---|
| Chippewas | 7 | 7 | 7 | 7 | 28 |
| Zips | 7 | 0 | 7 | 7 | 21 |

=== Bowling Green ===
| | 1 | 2 | 3 | 4 | Total |
|---|---|---|---|---|---|
| Falcons | 7 | 10 | 0 | 17 | 34 |
| Chippewas | 3 | 0 | 7 | 8 | 18 |

=== At Northern Illinois ===
| | 1 | 2 | 3 | 4 | Total |
|---|---|---|---|---|---|
| Chippewas | 14 | 7 | 7 | 7 | 35 |
| Huskies | 0 | 0 | 7 | 15 | 22 |

=== Buffalo ===
| | 1 | 2 | 3 | 4 | Total |
|---|---|---|---|---|---|
| Bulls | 7 | 17 | 0 | 3 | 27 |
| Chippewas | 7 | 0 | 17 | 7 | 31 |

=== Western Michigan ===
| | 1 | 2 | 3 | 4 | Total |
|---|---|---|---|---|---|
| Broncos | 7 | 0 | 0 | 5 | 12 |
| Chippewas | 7 | 0 | 3 | 0 | 10 |

=== At Eastern Michigan ===
| | 1 | 2 | 3 | 4 | Total |
|---|---|---|---|---|---|
| Chippewas | 7 | 6 | 0 | 6 | 19 |
| Eagles | 14 | 0 | 14 | 10 | 38 |
