= 2022 MAC Championship Game =

2022 Rocket Mortgage MAC Championship Game
- Conference championship
Toledo Rockets	Ohio Bobcats
(7–5)	(9–3)
17	7
Head coach: Jason Candle	Head coach: Tim Albin
	1	2	3	4	Total
Toledo	7	3	0	7	17
Ohio	0	7	0	0	7
- Date: December 3, 2022
- Season: 2022
- Stadium: Ford Field
- Location: Detroit, Michigan
- MVP: Offense: Dequan Finn (QB, Toledo); Defense: Dyontae Johnson (LB, Toledo); Special Teams: Jonathon Batzke (P, Toledo)
- Favorite: Toledo by 3.5
- Referee: Tom Stapleton
- Attendance: 15,550

United States TV coverage
- Network: ESPN
- Announcers: Beth Mowins (play-by-play), Kirk Morrison (Analyst), and Stormy Buonantony (sideline reporter)

2022 Mid-American Conference football standings
	Conf.			Overall
Team	W		L	W		L
East Division
Ohio xy	7	–	1	10	–	4
Buffalo	5	–	3	7	–	6
Bowling Green	5	–	3	6	–	7
Miami (OH)	4	–	4	6	–	7
Kent State	4	–	4	5	–	7
Akron	1	–	7	2	–	10
West Division
Toledo xy$	5	–	3	9	–	5
Eastern Michigan x	5	–	3	9	–	4
Western Michigan	4	–	4	5	–	7
Ball State	3	–	5	5	–	7
Central Michigan	3	–	5	4	–	8
Northern Illinois	2	–	6	3	–	9
Championship: Toledo 17, Ohio 7
$ – Conference champion; x – Division champion/co-champions; y – Championship game participant; Rankings from AP Poll

The 2022 MAC Championship Game was a college football conference championship game played December 3, 2022, at Ford Field in Detroit, Michigan. It was the 26th edition of the MAC Football Championship Game and determined the champion of the Mid-American Conference (MAC) for the 2022 season. The game began at 12:00 p.m. EST and aired on ESPN. The game featured the Western Division champion Toledo Rockets against the Eastern Division champion Ohio Bobcats. For sponsorship reasons, the game is officially known as the Rocket Mortgage MAC Championship.

Toledo won their fourth championship game with a 17–7 win over the Bobcats.

== Venue ==
The 2022 MAC title game was held at Ford Field for the 19th consecutive season. The venue, located in downtown Detroit at 2000 Brush St., is the home of the Detroit Lions of the National Football League (NFL) and has a seating capacity for football of 65,000.

== Teams ==
The game featured the Ohio Bobcats, champions of the East Division, and the Toledo Rockets, champions of the West Division, of the Mid-American Conference.

=== Toledo ===
Toledo clinched a berth in the championship game with two weeks remaining in the schedule following their win over Ball State and a loss by Western Michigan the following night. This is Toledo's seventh appearance in the championship game. They are 3–3 in prior attempts having won in their last appearance in 2017

The Rockets were 2–2 out of conference with wins over FCS LIU and UMass and losses at Ohio State and San Diego State. They opened conference play with 3 consecutive wins over Central Michigan, Northern Illinois, Kent State. Quarterback Dequan Finn was injured in a loss at Buffalo. Tucker Gleason led the Rockets to a win over Eastern Michigan and Finn returned for a win Ball State which wrapped up the division but sat out a loss to Bowling Green. Toledo ended their regular season with a loss to Western Michigan in which Finn played sparingly

=== Ohio ===
Ohio clinched a berth in the championship game during the final week of the season with a 38–14 win over Bowling Green. They entered the game 9–3 with a 7–1 record in the MAC and on a seven-game winning streak. This is Ohio's fifth appearance in the game and first since 2016. They are 0–4 in their previous attempts and have not won a conference championship since 1968.

The Bobcats were 2–2 out of conference with wins over Florida Atlantic and FCS Fordham and losses at power conference foes Penn State and Iowa State. They opened conference play with an overtime loss to Kent State and a win over last place Akron. Through six games Ohio was surrendering 40.6 points, 561 yards, and 387 passing yards per game but were 3–3 on the season with a prolific offense led by the passing of MAC Player of the Year Kurtis Rourke.

Ohio finished the regular season with consecutive wins over Western Michigan, Northern Illinois, Buffalo, Miami (OH), Ball State, and Bowling Green during which Ohio surrendered an average of only 18 points per game. Rourke suffered a season ending torn ACL against Ball State and Ohio turned to third-string quarterback C.J. Harris.

== Game summary ==
2022 MAC Championship Game
Toledo Rockets (7–5, 5–3) vs. Ohio Bobcats (9–3, 7–1)

Quarter	1	2	3	4	Total
Toledo	7	3	0	7	17
Ohio	0	7	0	0	7

at Ford Field • Detroit, MI

- Date: Saturday, December 3, 2022
- Game time: 12:00 p.m. EST
- Game weather: N/A (game played indoors)
- Game attendance: 15,550
- Referee: Tom Stapleton
- TV announcers (ESPN): Beth Mowins (play-by-play), Kirk Morrison (analyst) and Stormy Buonantony (sideline reporter)
- box score, Toledo notes, Ohio notes

Game information

First Quarter

- (11:38) TOL – Jacquez Stuart 29 yard rush, Thomas Cluckey kick (Drive: 8 plays, 75 yards, 3:22; Toledo 7–0)

Second Quarter

- (6:47) OHIO – Sieh Bangura 2 yard rush, Nathanial Vakos kick (Drive: 14 plays, 84 yards, 7:14; Tied 7–7)
- (0:16) TOL – Thomas Cluckey 44 yard field goal (Drive: 13 plays, 55 yards, 4:38; Toledo 10–7)

Third Quarter

- No scoring plays

Fourth Quarter

- 10:36 TOL – DeMeer Blankumsee 16 yard pass from Dequan Finn, Thomas Cluckey kick (Drive: 16 plays, 90 yards, 7:15; Toledo 17–7)

Statistics	Toledo	Ohio
First downs	20	14
Plays–Yards	71–390	60–262
Rushes/yards	46–236	29–99
Passing yards	154	163
Passing: Comp–Att–Int	16–25–0	17–31–1
Time of possession	33:00	27:00

Team	Category	Player	Statistics
Toledo	Passing	Dequan Finn	16/25, 154 yards, 1 TD
Toledo	Rushing	Jacquez Stuart	9 carries, 93 yards, 1 TD
Toledo	Receiving	Jerjuan Newton	6 receptions, 77 yards
Ohio	Passing	CJ Harris	17/31, 163 yards, 1 INT
Ohio	Rushing	Sieh Bangura	20 carries, 56 yards, 1 TD
Ohio	Receiving	Will Kacmarek	2 receptions, 39 yards
