= Jacoby Jones (wide receiver, born 2001) =

American football player (born 2001)

Profile
- Position: Wide receiver

Personal information
- Born: July 18, 2001 (age 25)
- Listed height: 6 ft 3 in (1.91 m)
- Listed weight: 228 lb (103 kg)

Career information
- High school: Rosa Fort (Tunica County, Mississippi)
- College: Northwest Mississippi (2019–2021); Ohio (2022–2023); UCF (2024)
- NFL draft: 2025: undrafted

Career history
- Washington Commanders (2025)

Career NFL statistics as of 2025
- Receptions: 1
- Receiving yards: 25
- Stats at Pro Football Reference

Jacoby Jones (born July 18, 2001) is an American professional football wide receiver. Jones played college football for the Northwest Mississippi Rangers, Ohio Bobcats and UCF Knights. He signed with the Commanders as an undrafted free agent in 2025.

== Early life ==
Jones was born on July 18, 2001, and grew up in Tunica, Mississippi. He attended Rosa Fort High School where he played football as a wide receiver, posting 57 catches for 1,030 yards and 16 touchdowns as a senior, being named the regional offensive MVP and second-team all-state. A two-star recruit, he enrolled at Northwest Mississippi Community College after his graduation from high school.

== College career ==
Jones played for Northwest Mississippi from 2019 to 2021, posting 371 receiving yards and two scores in 2019, 192 yards and two touchdowns in 2020, and 366 yards and one touchdown in 2021. He transferred to play for the Ohio Bobcats in 2022, finishing his stint at Northwest Mississippi with totals of 63 catches, 929 receiving yards and five touchdowns. In his first season at Ohio, 2022, he was their second-leading receiver, posting 777 receiving yards and six touchdowns. Jones had eight catches for 147 yards in three games to open the 2023 season before missing the rest of the year due to a broken leg. He transferred to the UCF Knights for his final season of college football in 2024. With the Knights, he tallied 22 receptions for 327 yards and two touchdowns.

== Professional career ==
Pre-draft measurables
Height	Weight	Arm length	Hand span	Wingspan	40-yard dash	10-yard split	20-yard split	20-yard shuttle	Three-cone drill	Vertical jump	Broad jump
6 ft 1 in (1.85 m)	225 lb (102 kg)	31 7/8 in (0.81 m)	10 1/8 in (0.26 m)	6 ft 4 5/8 in (1.95 m)	4.68 s	1.57 s	2.67 s	4.32 s	7.06 s	31.5 in (0.80 m)	10 ft 2 in (3.10 m)
All values from Pro Day

After going unselected in the 2025 NFL draft, Jones signed with the Washington Commanders as an undrafted free agent. After recording three catches for 17 yards in preseason, he was waived on August 26, 2025, then re-signed to the practice squad the next day. The Commanders signed Jones to their active roster on November 11. Jones made his professional debut in the first NFL International game in Madrid against the Miami Dolphins, where he recorded his first career reception for 25 yards. The Commanders waived Jones on November 18, and re-signed him to the practice squad two days later. On January 5, 2026, he signed a reserve/futures contract with the Commanders. On August 30, Jones was waived/injured and placed on injured reserve the next day after clearing waivers. He was released on September 9.
