= Sam Wiglusz =

American football player (born 1999)

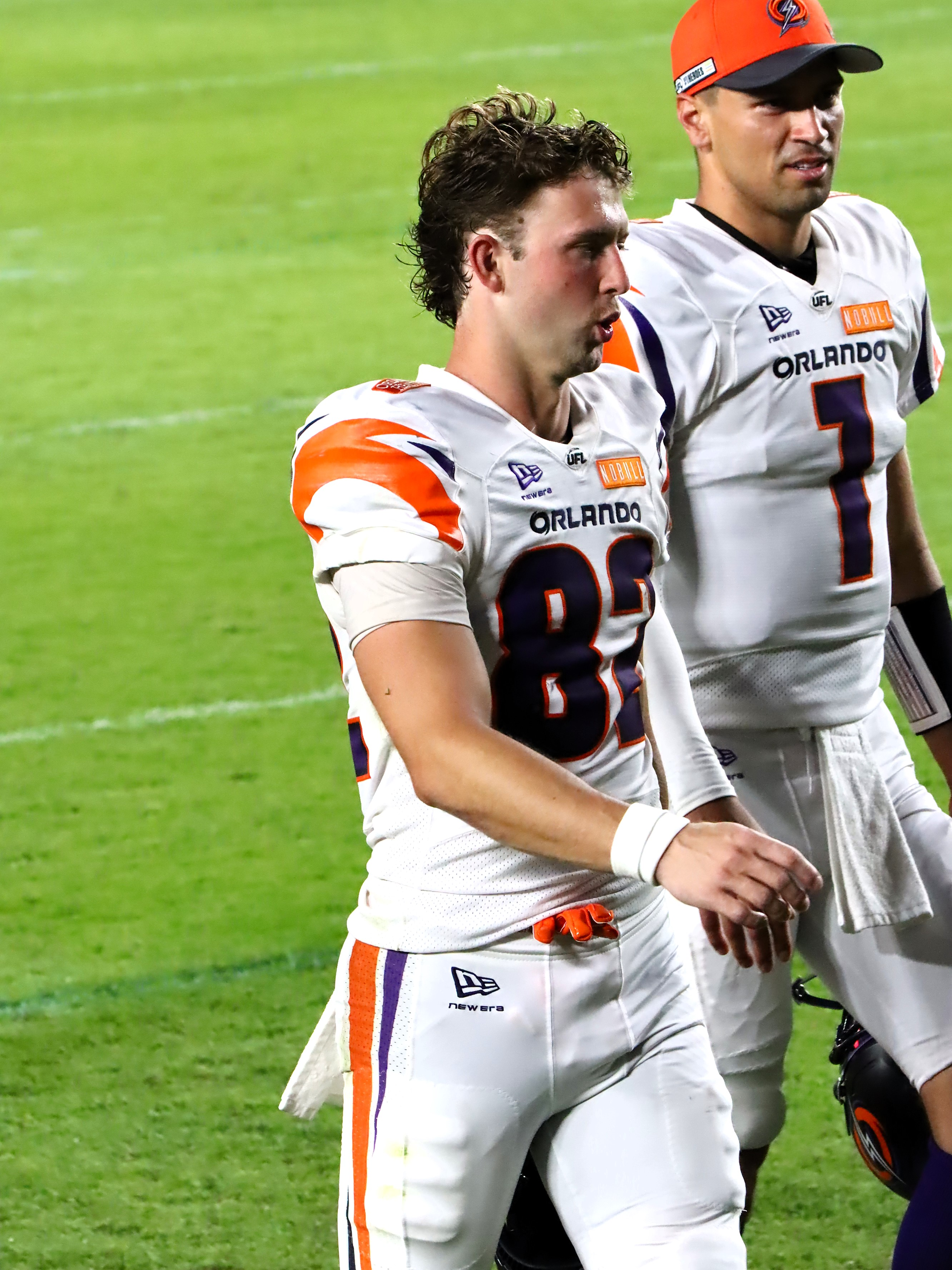
- Wiglusz with the Orlando Storm in 2026

No. 82 – Orlando Storm
- Position: Wide receiver
- Roster status: Active

Personal information
- Born: July 24, 1999 (age 27); Brecksville, Ohio, U.S.
- Listed height: 5 ft 11 in (1.80 m)
- Listed weight: 191 lb (87 kg)

Career information
- High school: Brecksville–Broadview Heights (Broadview Heights, Ohio)
- College: Ohio State (2018–2021); Ohio (2022–2023)
- NFL draft: 2024: undrafted

Career history
- Los Angeles Rams (2024)*; St. Louis Battlehawks (2025); Orlando Storm (2026–present)
- * Offseason or practice squad member only

Awards and highlights
- 2× First-team All-MAC (2022, 2023)
- Stats at Pro Football Reference

Sam Wiglusz (born July 24, 1999) is an American professional football wide receiver for the Orlando Storm of the United Football League (UFL). He played college football for the Ohio State Buckeyes and the Ohio Bobcats.

== Early life ==
Wiglusz attended high school at Brecksville–Broadview Heights High School. In Wiglusz's senior season, he posted 74 receptions for 1,428 yards and 13 touchdowns. Coming out of high school, Wiglusz decided to walk-on to play college football for the Ohio State Buckeyes.

== College career ==
=== Ohio State ===
In Wiglusz's first two seasons in 2019 and 2020, he combined to play in four games making one catch for 11 yards. During the 2021 season, Wiglusz played in six games notching two receptions for 14 yards. After the conclusion of the 2021 season, Wiglusz decided to enter his name into the NCAA transfer portal.

In Wiglusz's career at Ohio State, he played four seasons where he made three catches for 25 yards.

=== Ohio ===
Wiglusz decided to transfer to play for the Ohio Bobcats. On October 8, 2022, Wiglusz had a career performance notching 144 receiving yards and two touchdowns in a win over the Akron Zips. In week ten of the 2022, Wiglusz hauled in 131 yards and two touchdowns in a victory over the Buffalo Bulls. During the 2022 season, Wiglusz notched 73 receptions for 877 yards and 11 touchdowns en route to being named first team all-MAC. In week eight of the 2023 season, Wiglusz tallied 155 yards and a touchdown in a win over the Western Michigan Broncos. During the 2023 season, Wiglusz finished the season bringing in 56 receptions for 660 yards and three touchdowns. For his performance in the 2023 season, Wiglusz was once again named first team all-MAC.

== Professional career ==
Pre-draft measurables
Height	Weight	Arm length	Hand span	Wingspan	40-yard dash	10-yard split	20-yard split	20-yard shuttle	Three-cone drill	Vertical jump	Broad jump	Bench press
5 ft 10 5/8 in (1.79 m)	189 lb (86 kg)	30 1/4 in (0.77 m)	8 3/8 in (0.21 m)	5 ft 11 in (1.80 m)	4.63 s	1.63 s	2.68 s	4.31 s	6.94 s	32.5 in (0.83 m)	9 ft 10 in (3.00 m)	11 reps
All values from Pro Day

=== Los Angeles Rams ===
Wiglusz signed with the Los Angeles Rams as an undrafted free agent on May 2, 2024. He was waived on August 27, and re-signed to the practice squad. He was released on October 31.

=== St. Louis Battlehawks ===
On December 14, 2024, Wiglusz signed with the St. Louis Battlehawks of the United Football League (UFL). He was released on April 11, 2025. On May 6, Wiglusz re-signed with Battlehawks.

=== Orlando Storm ===
On January 13, 2026, Wiglusz was selected by the Orlando Storm in the 2026 UFL Draft.
