= 2022 Boca Raton Bowl =

Postseason college football bowl game

2022 RoofClaim.com Boca Raton Bowl
- 9th Boca Raton Bowl
Liberty Flames	Toledo Rockets
(8–4)	(8–5)
Independent	MAC
19	21
Head coach: Josh Aldridge (interim)	Head coach: Jason Candle
	1	2	3	4	Total
Liberty	7	0	0	12	19
Toledo	0	3	10	8	21
- Date: December 20, 2022
- Season: 2022
- Stadium: FAU Stadium
- Location: Boca Raton, Florida
- MVP: Offense: Dequan Finn (QB, Toledo); Defense: Nate Givhan (LB, Toledo); Special Teams: Thomas Cluckey (K, Toledo)
- Favorite: Toledo by 3.5
- National anthem: Jillian Flaherty
- Referee: Patrick Foy (C–USA)
- Attendance: 20,622
- Payout: US$900,000

United States TV coverage
- Network: ESPN
- Announcers: Anish Shroff (play-by-play); Tim Hasselbeck (analyst); Marilyn Payne (sideline)
- Nielsen ratings: 0.35 (1.4 million viewers)

International TV coverage
- Network: ESPN Deportes
- Announcers: Eitan Benezra (play-by-play); Alex Pombo (analyst)

The 2022 Boca Raton Bowl was a college football bowl game played on December 20, 2022, with kickoff at 7:35 p.m. EST and televised on ESPN. The game featured the Toledo Rockets, representing the Mid-American Conference, and the Liberty Flames, an FBS independent. It was the ninth edition of the Boca Raton Bowl, and was one of the 2022–23 bowl games concluding the 2022 FBS football season. Sponsored by RoofClaim.com, the game was officially known as the RoofClaim.com Boca Raton Bowl.

Defense proved to be the theme of the first half, as Liberty punted on their first drive and Toledo's first resulted in a turnover on downs. The game's first touchdown came on Liberty's second drive, by virtue of a 9-yard Shedro Louis rush with just over four minutes remaining in the first quarter. From there, only one drive for the rest of the half produced a score: a Toledo field goal four minutes into the second quarter. The rest of the drives resulted in punts until Liberty's final drive was cut short by halftime. Toledo's offense started the second half quickly with a touchdown drive to take the lead, and they forced a Liberty fumble and turned it into a field goal of their own, increasing their lead to six points. Liberty missed a chance at narrowing their deficit with a failed 32-yard field goal attempt late in the third quarter and Toledo scored to make their lead 14 points shortly thereafter. Liberty responded with a touchdown of their own but missed the extra point. A touchdown by Liberty with under four minutes to play narrowed Toledo's lead to two points but the Rockets were able to run out the clock and secure a 21–19 victory.

== Teams ==
The Boca Raton Bowl was played between Toledo, from the Mid-American Conference, and Liberty, an FBS independent. This was the fourth meeting between the two teams; the Rockets had won all three of their previous meetings, with the last coming in 2007 at the Glass Bowl.

=== Liberty Flames ===
Liberty began their season with wins over Southern Miss, in four overtimes, and UAB. The Flames then lost to No. 23 Wake Forest, before getting back on track and winning six straight games against Akron, Old Dominion, UMass, Gardner–Webb, BYU, and Arkansas. The Flames then dropped close games against UConn and Virginia Tech. To conclude their regular season, Liberty suffered a five-touchdown loss to New Mexico State. The Flames ended the regular season at 8–4.

The Flames, an FBS independent, were coached by interim head coach Josh Aldridge for this bowl game, following the departure of Hugh Freeze to the head coaching position at Auburn. This will be Liberty's final game as an FBS independent, as the Flames are set to join Conference USA in 2023. Liberty entered the game with a 3–0 record in bowl games.

=== Toledo Rockets ===
Toledo began their season strong, with dominant wins over LIU and UMass, though they suffered a large loss to Ohio State and lost a close game to San Diego State. The Rockets then won three straight games, against Central Michigan, Northern Illinois, and Kent State. Toledo then dropped a close game against Buffalo, but recovered to beat Eastern Michigan and Ball State. The Rockets dropped a close game against rival Bowling Green, and lost the last game of their regular season to Western Michigan. They finished the regular season co-champions of the MAC West Division with Eastern Michigan, though they advanced to the MAC Championship because they owned the tiebreaker between the two teams. In the title game, Toledo defeated Ohio to claim the MAC championship. The Rockets entered the bowl game 8–5 and 5–3 in MAC games.

This is Toledo's second time playing in the Boca Raton Bowl; the first time was in 2015 when they defeated No. 24 Temple.

== Game summary ==
The Boca Raton Bowl was televised by ESPN, with a commentary team of Anish Shroff, Tim Hasselbeck, and Marilyn Payne. The ESPN Radio broadcast was commentated by Chris Carlin and Rene Ingoglia. The game's officiating crew, representing Conference USA, was led by referee Patrick Foy and umpire Anthony Britt. At kickoff, the weather at FAU Stadium in Boca Raton, Florida, the site of the game, was 73 °F (23 °C) and sunny.

=== First half ===
The game began at 7:35 p.m. EST with Thomas Cluckey performing the opening kickoff, which was returned by Liberty's Demario Douglas to his own 18-yard-line. The Flames offense started the game with five consecutive passes by quarterback Kaidon Salter, the first three of which were complete for a total of 20 yards to Douglas and Caleb Snead. The fifth was also completed, to CJ Yarbrough for another first down. The Flames soon faced 3rd & 1, though, and Salter's pass went for no gain, leading them to punt on fourth down. The kick was fair caught at the Toledo 12-yard-line, and the Rockets offense gained yardage with a 5-yard rush by Dequan Finn and a 6-yard rush by Jacquez Stuart on their first two plays. Finn passed to Maddox for a first down on their next play, and he connected with Anthony Torres for 18 yards later in the drive. After several plays, they faced a fourth down of their own, at which point Finn was sacked by TreShaun Clark for a loss of 8 yards, resulting in a turnover on downs. Salter rushed for 20 yards on the third play of Liberty's next drive and a pass interference penalty moved them into the red zone; they scored on the next play with a 9-yard rush by Louis, marking the first points of the game. The Rockets went three-and-out on their next drive after a sack by Aakil Washington and Mike Smith Jr. set them back 7 yards on third down. Douglas returned the punt to the Liberty 38-yard-line and a pass interference on their second play advanced them another 15 yards, though a 5-yard rush and a pass for a loss of 1 yard ended the quarter.

The first play of the second quarter was a punt by Aidan Alves, which was fair caught at the Toledo 9-yard-line by Adam Beale. Toledo scored their first points on their next drive, as a pass from Tucker Gleason to Lenny Kuhl for 12 yards and a rush by Peny Boone for 10 yards gained first downs on consecutive plays and a 38-yard pass later in the drive set up a 41-yard field goal by Cluckey to make the score 7–3. Liberty was not able to respond immediately as they went three-and-out, prompted by a loss of 7 yards after a sack by Jackson Barrow despite a 15-yard rush by Salter on the next play that came two yards short of picking up the first down. Toledo gained a pair of first downs on their next drive but ultimately faced 4th & 7 and had to punt after an illegal procedure set them back five yards at the start of the series. Liberty again went three-and-out in what would be their final full drive of the half, having gained two yards in three plays, and their punt was returned by Beale to the Toledo 38-yard-line. Toledo gained a first down in two plays and gained another in two more before calling a timeout with 1:16 remaining. After a rush for 4 yards and a pass that lost 6 yards, the Rockets punted for a touchback with eight seconds left. Liberty opted to take a knee and head to halftime with a four-point lead.

=== Second half ===
Toledo got the ball to begin the second half but fumbled on their first play from scrimmage, though a Rockets player was able to recover it and keep possession. Finn completed a pass to Jerjuan Newton for a gain of 12 yards to earn a first down on the next play, and Toledo crossed midfield three plays later. A 15-yard rush by Stuart followed, and Finn passed to Newton again for 13 yards later in the drive to convert 3rd & 7. The Rockets took the lead for the first time with a 4-yard pass from Finn to Kuhl on the next play and got the ball back quickly afterwards as Liberty fumbled on their own 8-yard-line and the ball was recovered by Jamal Hines. A loss of 4 yards on Toledo's next drive set them back to the 12-yard-line but they were still able to capitalize off of the turnover with a 29-yard field goal by Cluckey. A 17-yard rush by Salter started off Liberty's next drive but the Flames offense was not able to move the ball after that, and a false start penalty added to their struggle. They punted on 4th & 7 but the kick was muffed at the Toledo 10-yard-line by Beale and recovered by Treon Sibley for the Flames. A holding penalty set them back to the Toledo 16-yard-line for 3rd & Goal before a false start pushed them back five yards more. On 4th & Goal, placekicker Nick Brown missed a 32-yard field goal attempt, giving the ball back to Toledo. The Rockets gained a first down when Finn passed to Turner for a gain of 8 yards to reach their own 34-yard-line, and the next few plays saw them reach their own 45-yard-line before time ran out and the third quarter came to an end.

Toledo started the fourth quarter with an incomplete pass from their own 45-yard-line. They completed the next pass for a gain of 8 yards, crossing midfield, and Micah Kelly rushed for 16 yards several plays later to enter the red zone. The Rockets reached the Liberty 4-yard-line on the next play, and scored to stretch their lead three plays later with a 1-yard rush by Finn. Rather than attempting an extra point, Toledo attempted a two-point conversion, which was successful, in order to make the lead 14 points rather than 13. Liberty moved the ball quite well themselves on their next drive, as they took over at their own 31-yard-line and faltered initially before a pass interference penalty and an 11-yard gain took them into Toledo territory after four plays. Just two plays later, the Flames scored on a 29-yard pass from Salter to Sibley, but the extra point was no good and Toledo's lead remained at eight points. The Rockets were unable to extend it after retaking possession at their own 25-yard-line following a touchback; they converted a third-and-long with a 12-yard pass from Finn to DeMeer Blankumsee but gained six yards on their next two plays before Finn was sacked by Washington for a loss of 12 yards to bring up a punting situation. The kick was fair caught by Douglas at the Liberty 33-yard-line, and the Flames struck quickly with a 67-yard touchdown pass from Daniels to Bentley Hanshaw on their next play from scrimmage. In an attempt to tie the game, they went for a 2-point conversion but it was not successful. Toledo resumed possession at their own 26-yard-line with 3:31 left in the game, and they took the clock down to 2:02 with three Stuart rushes before Liberty called a timeout. Another pair of rushes by Stuart gained 24 yards in total and prompted Liberty's final timeout, after which Stuart rushed for a first down that all but ended the game. Toledo took a knee twice to run out the remaining 62 seconds and finalized their 21–19 win. The game ended at 10:51 p.m. EST, after a total duration of three hours and fifteen minutes.

=== Scoring summary ===
2022 RoofClaim.com Boca Raton Bowl

Quarter	1	2	3	4	Total
Liberty	7	0	0	12	19
Toledo	0	3	10	8	21

at FAU Stadium • Boca Raton, Florida

- Date: December 20, 2022
- Game time: 7:30 p.m. EST
- Game weather: Rain • Temperature: 70 °F (21 °C) • Wind: 7 mph (11 km/h) north
- Game attendance: 20,622
- Referee: Patrick Foy
- TV announcers (ESPN): Anish Shroff (play-by-play), Tim Hasselbeck (analyst) and Marilyn Payne (sideline)
- Box score

Scoring summary

Quarter	Time	Drive			Team	Scoring information	Score	
Quarter	Time	Plays	Yards	TOP	Team	Scoring information	Liberty	Toledo
1	3:50	5	53	1:37	Liberty	Shedro Louis 9-yard touchdown run, Nick Brown kick good	7	0
2	10:51	10	68	4:02	Toledo	41-yard field goal by Thomas Cluckey	7	3
3	8:45	13	75	6:15	Toledo	Lenny Kuhl 4-yard touchdown reception from Dequan Finn, Thomas Cluckey kick good	7	10
3	7:09	4	−4	0:54	Toledo	29-yard field goal by Thomas Cluckey	7	13
4	10:35	16	80	7:00	Toledo	Dequan Finn 1-yard touchdown run, 2-point pass good	7	21
4	7:24	7	69	3:11	Liberty	Treon Sibley 29-yard touchdown reception from Kaidon Salter, Nick Brown kick failed	13	21
4	3:40	1	67	0:13	Liberty	Bentley Hanshaw 67-yard touchdown reception from CJ Daniels, 2-point pass failed	19	21
"TOP" = time of possession. For other American football terms, see Glossary of American football.							19	21

== Statistics ==
Team statistical comparison
Statistic	Liberty	Toledo
First downs	12	27
First downs rushing	4	13
First downs passing	5	13
First downs penalty	3	1
Third down efficiency	2–8	10–17
Fourth down efficiency	0–0	0–1
Total plays–net yards	41–253	84–356
Rushing attempts–net yards	20–102	56–173
Yards per rush	5.1	3.1
Yards passing	151	183
Pass completions–attempts	13–21	18–28
Interceptions thrown	0	0
Punt returns–total yards	1–1	3–28
Kickoff returns–total yards	4–69	1–1
Punts–average yardage	5–52.4	4–34.3
Fumbles–lost	1–1	3–1
Penalties–yards	5–40	5–55
Time of possession	19:57	40:03

Liberty statistics
Flames passing
	C–A	Yds	TD–INT
Kaidon Salter	12–20	84	1–0
CJ Daniels	1–1	67	1–0
Flames rushing
	Car	Yds	TD
Kaidon Salter	10	63	0
Shedro Louis	8	37	1
T.J. Green	1	3	0
Flames receiving
	Rec	Yds	TD
Bentley Hanshaw	2	73	1
Treon Sibley	3	42	1
Demario Douglas	6	16	0
Caleb Snead	1	13	0
CJ Yarbrough	1	7	0

Toledo statistics
Rockets passing
	C–A	Yds	TD–INT
Dequan Finn	16–24	133	1–0
Tucker Gleason	2–4	50	0–0
Rockets rushing
	Car	Yds	TD
Jacquez Stuart	23	111	0
Peny Boone	6	25	0
Dequan Finn	17	23	1
Micah Kelly	7	22	0
Jerjuan Newton	1	−1	0
Rockets receiving
	Rec	Yds	TD
Jamal Turner	3	53	0
DeMeer Blankumsee	4	42	0
Jerjuan Newton	5	42	0
Anthony Torres	1	18	0
Lenny Kuhl	2	16	0
Devin Maddox	1	12	0
Thomas Zsiros	1	6	0
Jacquez Stuart	1	− 6	0

== Aftermath ==
As a result of the game, Toledo finished their season with a 9–5 record while Liberty dropped to 8–5. It was the first bowl game loss in Liberty program history as the Flames had won each of their first three bowl appearances since their move to FBS in 2018. It was Toledo's first bowl victory since the 2015 team won the Boca Raton Bowl.

Interim head coach Josh Aldridge, who was previously the co-defensive coordinator and linebackers coach at Liberty, departed the program on December 21 to take a position as the linebackers coach at Auburn, following former Liberty head coach Hugh Freeze.
