= DJ Irons =

American football player

No. 5 – All Mitsubishi Lions
- Position: Quarterback

Personal information
- Listed height: 6 ft 4 in (1.93 m)
- Listed weight: 215 lb (98 kg)

Career information
- High school: Grayson (Loganville, Georgia)
- College: Eastern Kentucky (2018); Iowa Central (2019–2020); Akron (2021–2023)
- NFL draft: 2024: undrafted

Career history
- Panthers Wrocław (2025); All Mitsubishi Lions (2026–present)

Awards and highlights
- Third team All-MAC (2022)

Demarcus Levon "DJ" Irons Jr. is an American quarterback for the All Mitsubishi Lions of the X-League. He played college football for the Eastern Kentucky Colonels, Iowa Central Tritions, and Akron Zips. In 2025, he played for the Panthers Wrocław in the European League of Football.

== Early life ==
Irons grew up in Lawrenceville, Georgia and attended Grayson High School where he lettered in football, basketball and track and field. He was recognized as the Georgia 7A Offensive Player of the Year as a senior. He was rated a three-star recruit and committed to play college football at Eastern Kentucky over offers from Austin Peay, Florida A&M, Jackson State, Prairie View A&M, Savannah State and Tennessee State.

== College career ==
=== Eastern Kentucky ===
Irons redshirted during his true freshman year in 2018 and did not play any games.

=== Iowa Central CC ===
In 2019, Irons played 11 games and completed 115 of 185 passing attempts for 2,039 yards, 21 touchdowns and five interceptions.

=== Akron ===
In 2021, Irons appeared in eight games and started three. He completed 78 of 120 passing attempts for 892 yards, eight touchdowns and four interceptions. In 2022, he started 10 games and completed 253 of 380 passing attempts for 2,609 yards, 10 touchdowns and seven interceptions.

In 2023, Irons was named as the Mid-American Conference (MAC) East Offensive Player of the Week after his performance against Indiana, where he generated 335 of 474 yards and accumulated 141 yards with two touchdowns, including a 14-yard rushing touchdown. The next week against Buffalo, he suffered a season-ending ACL tear. Irons finished the season with 88 completions on 133 passing attempts for 722 yards, three touchdowns and three interceptions.

=== Statistics ===
Year	Team	Games			Passing								Rushing			
Year	Team	GP	GS	Record	Cmp	Att	Pct	Yds	Avg	TD	INT	Rtg	Att	Yds	Avg	TD
2018	Eastern Kentucky	Redshirt														
2019	Iowa Central CC	11	—	—	115	185	62.2	2,039	11.0	21	5	186.8	105	274	2.6	5
2020	Iowa Central CC	No season played due to COVID-19														
2021	Akron	8	3	1–2	78	120	65.0	892	7.4	8	4	142.8	91	296	3.3	2
2022	Akron	10	10	1–9	253	379	66.8	2,606	6.9	10	7	129.5	133	314	2.4	4
2023	Akron	5	5	1–4	88	133	66.2	722	5.4	3	3	114.7	61	215	3.5	2
Career		23	18	3–15	419	632	66.3	4,220	6.7	21	14	128.9	285	825	2.9	8

== Professional career ==
Pre-draft measurables
Height	Weight	Arm length	Hand span
6 ft 3 3/8 in (1.91 m)	205 lb (93 kg)	31 3/8 in (0.80 m)	9 1/2 in (0.24 m)
All values from Pro Day

=== Panthers Wrocław ===
In October 2024, Irons was signed by the Panthers Wrocław in the European League of Football for the 2025 season where he was named the starting quarterback. His contract was renewed for the 2026 season.

=== All Mitsubishi Lions ===
On April 22, 2026, Irons was signed by the All Mitsubishi Lions of the Japanese X-League.
