= 2022 Liberty Flames football team =

American college football season

2022 Liberty Flames football

Boca Raton Bowl, L 19–21 vs. Toledo
- Conference: Independent
- Record: 8–5
- Head coach: Hugh Freeze (4th season; regular season); Josh Aldridge (interim; bowl game)
- Offensive coordinator: Kent Austin (4th season)
- Co-offensive coordinator: Maurice Harris (3rd season)
- Offensive scheme: Multiple
- Co-defensive coordinators: Josh Aldridge (4th season); Jack Curtis (2nd season)
- Base defense: 4–2–5
- Home stadium: Williams Stadium

2022 NCAA Division I FBS independents football records
	Conf.			Overall
Team	W		L	W		L
No. 18 Notre Dame		–		9	–	4
Liberty		–		8	–	5
BYU		–		8	–	5
New Mexico State		–		7	–	6
Army		–		6	–	6
UConn		–		6	–	7
UMass		–		1	–	11
Rankings from AP Poll

The 2022 Liberty Flames football team represented Liberty University in the 2022 NCAA Division I FBS football season. The Flames played their home games at Williams Stadium in Lynchburg, Virginia, and competed as an FBS independent. They were led by fourth-year head coach Hugh Freeze, who left before the bowl game leading to intern head coach Josh Aldridge.

The 2022 season was the program's last season as an independent as the Flames joined Conference USA in 2023.

== Schedule ==
Liberty hosted six home games and travelled to six away games.

Date	Time	Opponent	Site	TV	Result	Attendance
September 3	7:00 p.m.	at Southern Miss	M. M. Roberts Stadium; Hattiesburg, MS	ESPN+	W 29–27 ^{4OT}	24,051
September 10	6:00 p.m.	UAB	Williams Stadium; Lynchburg, VA	ESPN+	W 21–14	18,892
September 17	5:00 p.m.	at No. 19 Wake Forest	Truist Field at Wake Forest; Winston-Salem, NC	ACCN	L 36–37	32,891
September 24	6:00 p.m.	Akron	Williams Stadium; Lynchburg, VA	ESPN+	W 21–12	20,004
October 1	6:00 p.m.	at Old Dominion	S.B. Ballard Stadium; Norfolk, VA	ESPN+	W 38–24	18,368
October 8	3:30 p.m.	at UMass	Warren McGuirk Alumni Stadium; Hadley, MA	ESPN+	W 42–24	11,217
October 15	3:30 p.m.	Gardner–Webb^{†}	Williams Stadium; Lynchburg, VA	ESPN+	W 21–20	20,924
October 22	3:30 p.m.	BYU	Williams Stadium; Lynchburg, VA	ESPNU	W 41–14	24,012
November 5	4:00 p.m.	at Arkansas	Donald W. Reynolds Razorback Stadium; Fayetteville, AR	SECN	W 21–19	70,072
November 12	12:00 p.m.	at UConn	Rentschler Field; East Hartford, CT	CBSSN	L 33–36	15,107
November 19	12:00 p.m.	Virginia Tech	Williams Stadium; Lynchburg, VA	ESPN+	L 22–23	23,055
November 26	12:00 p.m.	New Mexico State	Williams Stadium; Lynchburg, VA	ESPN+	L 14–49	18,837
December 20	7:30 p.m.	vs. Toledo	FAU Stadium; Boca Raton, FL (Boca Raton Bowl)	ESPN	L 19–21	20,622
^{†}Homecoming; Rankings from AP Poll (and CFP Rankings, after November 1) - Released prior to game; All times are in Eastern time

== Coaching staff ==
Name	Title
Hugh Freeze	Head coach
Kent Austin	Co-offensive coordinator / quarterbacks coach
Maurice Harris	Co-offensive coordinator/wide receivers coach
Josh Aldridge	Co-defensive coordinator/linebackers coach intern head coach in the Boca Raton Bowl
Jack Curtis	Co-defensive coordinator/safeties coach
Chris Klenakis	Offensive line coach
Jeremy Garrett	Defensive line coach
Darius Eubanks	Defensive backs coach
Tanner Burns	Special Teams coordinator/outside linebackers coach
Ben Aigamaua	Tight ends coach
Bruce Johnson	Running backs coach
Robert Bala	Defensive analyst

== Game summaries ==
=== At Southern Miss ===
	1	2	3	4	OT	2OT	3OT	4OT	Total
Flames	0	10	0	14	0	3	0	2	29
Golden Eagles	0	3	7	14	0	3	0	0	27

Statistics

Statistics	LIB	USM
First downs	23	19
Total yards	447	389
Rushing yards	244	252
Passing yards	203	137
Turnovers	3	5
Time of possession	29:06	30:54

Team	Category	Player	Statistics
Liberty	Passing	Kaidon Salter	8/13, 148 yards, 2 TD, INT
Liberty	Rushing	Kaidon Salter	9 rushes, 65 yards
Liberty	Receiving	DeMario Douglas	5 receptions, 97 yards, 2 TD
Southern Miss	Passing	Ty Keyes	4/8, 89 yards, 2 INT
Southern Miss	Rushing	Frank Gore Jr.	32 rushes, 178 yards, 2 TD
Southern Miss	Receiving	Jakarius Caston	2 receptions, 54 yards

=== UAB ===
	1	2	3	4	Total
Blazers	7	0	0	7	14
Flames	0	7	7	7	21

Statistics	UAB	LIB
First downs	15	18
Total yards	355	390
Rushing yards	241	188
Passing yards	114	202
Turnovers	4	1
Time of possession	31:29	28:31

Team	Category	Player	Statistics
UAB	Passing	Dylan Hopkins	10/15, 114 yards, TD
UAB	Rushing	DeWayne McBride	20 rushes, 177 yards, TD
UAB	Receiving	Trea Shropshire	1 reception, 56 yards
Liberty	Passing	Kaidon Salter	13/25, 202 yards
Liberty	Rushing	Kaidon Salter	14 rushes, 79 yards, TD
Liberty	Receiving	Noah Frith	2 receptions, 75 yards

=== At No. 19 Wake Forest ===
	1	2	3	4	Total
Flames	0	8	15	13	36
No. 19 Demon Deacons	3	17	0	17	37

Statistics

Statistics	LIB	WFU
First downs	22	16
Total yards	427	346
Rushing yards	171	21
Passing yards	256	325
Turnovers	4	2
Time of possession	35:28	24:32

Team	Category	Player	Statistics
Liberty	Passing	Kaidon Salter	19/34, 256 yards, 2 TD, 2 INT
Liberty	Rushing	Dae Dae Hunter	17 rushes, 89 yards, TD
Liberty	Receiving	Demario Douglas	7 receptions, 124 yards, TD
Wake Forest	Passing	Sam Hartman	26/44, 325 yards, 3 TD, 2 INT
Wake Forest	Rushing	Sam Hartman	8 rushes, 11 yards
Wake Forest	Receiving	Ke'Shawn Williams	5 receptions, 129 yards

=== Akron ===
	1	2	3	4	Total
Zips	0	3	3	6	12
Flames	7	7	0	7	21

=== At Old Dominion ===
	1	2	3	4	Total
Flames	14	7	10	7	38
Monarchs	14	3	7	0	24

Statistics

Statistics	LIB	ODU
First downs	23	20
Total yards	478	415
Rushing yards	210	118
Passing yards	268	297
Turnovers	2	1
Time of possession	28:57	31:03

Team	Category	Player	Statistics
Liberty	Passing	Kaidon Salter	10/19, 170 yards, 2 TD, 2 INT
Liberty	Rushing	Dae Dae Hunter	15 rushes, 121 yards, 2 TD
Liberty	Receiving	CJ Yarbrough	4 receptions, 94 yards, TD
Old Dominion	Passing	Hayden Wolff	27/46, 297 yards, 2 TD, INT
Old Dominion	Rushing	Blake Watson	15 rushes, 80 yards
Old Dominion	Receiving	Ali Jennings III	8 receptions, 129 yards, TD

=== At UMass ===
	1	2	3	4	Total
Flames	0	21	14	7	42
Minutemen	7	3	0	14	24

=== Gardner-Webb ===
	1	2	3	4	Total
Runnin' Bulldogs	0	10	7	3	20
Flames	7	7	0	7	21

=== BYU ===
	1	2	3	4	Total
Cougars	14	0	0	0	14
Flames	3	17	14	7	41

=== At Arkansas ===
Game Nine – Liberty Flames (7–1) at Arkansas Razorbacks (5–3)

Quarter	1	2	3	4	Total
Flames	7	14	0	0	21
Razorbacks	0	3	2	14	19

at Donald W. Reynolds Razorback Stadium • Fayetteville, Arkansas

- Date: Saturday, November 5, 2022
- Game time: 3:00 p.m. CST
- Game weather: Clear • Temperature: 56 °F (13 °C) • Wind: 10 mph SW
- Game attendance: 70,072
- Referee: Scott Walker
- TV announcers (SEC Network): Taylor Zarzour (play-by-play), Aaron Murray (analyst), Alyssa Lang (sideline)
- ESPN

Game information

First quarter

- (0:17) Liberty – Noah Frith 16 yard pass from Johnathan Bennett, Nick Brown kick (Drive: 5 plays, 59 yards, 1:19; Liberty 7–0)

Second quarter

- (6:09) Liberty – Demario Douglas 20 yard pass from Johnathan Bennett, Nick Brown kick (Drive: 5 plays, 53 yards, 2:46; Liberty 14–0)
- (0:42) Liberty – Treon Sibley 18 yard pass from Johnathan Bennett, Nick Brown kick (Drive: 10 plays, 80 yards, 4:13; Liberty 21–0)
- (0:00) Arkansas – Cam Little 50 yard field goal (Drive: 4 plays, 44 yards, 0:35; Liberty 21–3)

Third quarter

- (5:33) Arkansas – Punt blocked through the end zone by Quincey McAdoo, safety (Liberty 21–5)

Fourth quarter

- (7:42) Arkansas – Trey Knox 5 yard pass from KJ Jefferson, 2-point rush good (Drive: 17 plays, 84 yards, 5:07; Liberty 21–13)
- (2:36) Arkansas - Trey Knox 8 yard pass from KJ Jefferson, 2-point pass failed (Drive: 7 plays, 85 yards; Liberty 21-19)

Statistics	LIB	ARK
First downs	17	22
Plays–yards	63–315	79–428
Rushes–yards	38–91	42–144
Passing yards	224	284
Passing: comp–att–int	15–25–1	23–37–2
Time of possession	30:38	29:22

Team	Category	Player	Statistics
Liberty	Passing	Johnathan Bennett	15–25, 224 yards, 3 TD, 1 INT
Liberty	Rushing	Shedro Louis	15 carries, 57 yards
Liberty	Receiving	Demario Douglas	7 receptions, 145 yards, 1 TD
Arkansas	Passing	KJ Jefferson	23–37, 284 yards, 2 TD, 2 INT
Arkansas	Rushing	Raheim Sanders	17 carries, 60 yards
Arkansas	Receiving	Matt Landers	6 receptions, 119 yards

=== At UConn ===
Game Ten - Liberty Flames (8-1) at UConn Huskies (5-5)

Quarter	1	2	3	4	Total
Flames	3	14	10	6	33
Huskies	14	7	0	15	36

at Pratt & Whitney Stadium at Rentschler Field • East Hartford, Connecticut

- Date: November 12
- Game time: 12:02 p.m.
- Game weather: Temperature: 68 °F (20 °C) • Weather: Sunny
- Game attendance: 15,107
- Referee: Marcus Woods
- TV announcers (CBSSN): Meghan McPeak (play-by-play), Christian Fauria (color analyst), and Justin Walters (sideline)
- Box Score

Game information

First quarter

- CONN – Victor Rosa 16 yd run (Noe Ruelas kick), 10:28. Huskies 7–0. Drive: 8 plays, 51 yards, TOP 04:27
- LU – Nick Brown 38-yard field goal, 7:31. Huskies 7–3. Drive: 8 plays, 55 yards, TOP 02:57
- CONN – Jackson Mitchell 31 yd fumble recovery (Noe Ruelas kick), 1:47. Huskies 14–3.

Second quarter

- LU – CJ Yarbrough 3 yd pass from Johnathan Bennett (Nick Brown kick), 13:00. Huskies 14–10. Drive: 4 plays, 49 yards, TOP 01:13
- CONN – Robert Burns 1 yd run (Noe Ruelas kick), 5:16. Huskies 21–10. Drive: 8 plays, 94 yards, TOP 04:08
- LU – Malik Caper 1 yd run (Nick Brown kick), 00:35. Huskies 21–17. Drive: 8 plays, 47 yards, TOP 01:36

Third quarter

- LU – TJ Green 1 yd run (Nick Brown kick), 12:33. Flames 24–21. Drive: 7 plays, 80 yards, TOP 02:21
- LU – Nick Brown 34-yard field goal, 4:24. Flames 27–21. Drive: 17 plays, 59 yards, TOP 06:12

Fourth quarter

- CONN – Victor Rosa 27 yd run (Noe Ruelas kick), 14:52. Huskies 28–27. Drive: 8 plays, 75 yards, TOP 04:32
- LU – Demario Douglas 75 yd run (2 pt conv no good), 14:39. Flames 33–28. Drive: 1 plays, 75 yards, TOP 00:13
- CONN – Kevens Clercius 30 yd pass from Zion Turner (Keelan Marion pass good), 5:43. Huskies 36–33. Drive: 6 plays, 41 yards, TOP 02:57

Top passers

- CONN – Zion Turner – 15/21, 102 yards, 1 TD
- LU – Johnathan Bennett – 23/37, 201 yards, 1 TD

Top rushers

- CONN – Robert Burns – 11 rushes, 104 yards, 1 TD
- LU – TJ Green – 24 rushes, 119 yards, 1 TD

Top receivers

- CONN – Aaron Turner – 10 receptions, 65 yards
- LU – Demario Douglas – 8 receptions, 70 yards

Top defense

- CONN – Ian Swenson – 11 tackles
- LU – Javon Scruggs – 8 tackles

Statistics	UConn	Liberty
First downs	15	29
Total yards	318	474
Rushing yards	209	267
Passing yards	109	207
Turnovers	2	2
Time of possession	32:18	27:42

=== Virginia Tech ===
Game Eleven - Virginia Tech Hokies (2–8) at Liberty Flames (8–2)

Quarter	1	2	3	4	Total
Virginia Tech	7	10	0	6	23
Liberty	7	10	5	0	22

at Williams Stadium • Lynchburg, VA

- Date: November 19, 2022
- Game time: 12:00 p.m. EDT
- Game weather: sunny • Temperature: 46 °F (8 °C)
- Game attendance: 23,055
- Referee: Jeff Flanagan
- TV announcers (ESPN+): Matt Warner, Joe Jauch, Emily Austen

Game information

First Quarter

- (6:57) VT - Jalen Holston 2 yd Rush (John Love Kick) (Drive: 8 plays, 80 yards, 4:10; VT 7-0)
- (2:34) LIB - Johnathan Bennett 15 yd Rush (Nick Brown Kick) (Drive: 8 plays, 89 yards, 3:02; 7-7)

Second Quarter

- (13:09) VT – Jalen Holston 5 yd Rush (John Love Kick) (Drive: 12 plays, 67 yards, 4:17; VT 14–7)
- (7:06) VT - John Love 23 yd Field Goal (Drive: 10 plays, 59 yards, 4:26; VT 17-7)
- (6:52) LIB - Shedro Louis 97 yd Kickoff Return (Nick Brown Kick) (VT 17-14)
- (0:05) LIB - Nick Brown 47 yd Field Goal (Drive: 8 plays, 51 yards, 0:57; 17-17)

Third Quarter

- (12:04) LIB - Grant Wells (VT) Sacked by Kendy Charles in the Endzone for a Safety (LIB 19-17)
- (3:50) LIB - Nick Brown 37 yd Field Goal (Drive: 9 plays, 57 yards, 3:37; LIB 22-17)

Fourth Quarter

- (7:46) VT - Jalen Holston 1 yd Rush (Drive: 13 plays, 64 yards, 5:31; VT 23-22)

Statistics	VT	LIB
First downs	19	20
Total yards	324	332
Rush yards	176	115
Passing yards	148	217
Turnovers	0	0
Time of possession	36:19	23:41

Team	Category	Player	Statistics
Virginia Tech	Passing	Grant Wells	14/20, 148 yards
Virginia Tech	Rushing	Jalen Holston	26 carries, 99 yards, 3 TD
Virginia Tech	Receiving	Nick Gallo	2 receptions, 45 yards
Liberty	Passing	Kaidon Salter	12/18, 119 yards
Liberty	Rushing	Shedro Louis	9 carries, 64 yards
Liberty	Receiving	Demario Douglas	9 receptions, 69 yards

=== New Mexico State ===
	1	2	3	4	Total
Aggies	7	21	14	7	49
Flames	7	0	0	7	14

=== Vs. Toledo (Boca Raton Bowl) ===
	1	2	3	4	Total
Flames	7	0	0	12	19
Rockets	0	3	10	8	21

== Rankings ==
Ranking movements Legend: ██ Increase in ranking ██ Decrease in ranking — = Not ranked RV = Received votes
	Week															
Poll	Pre	1	2	3	4	5	6	7	8	9	10	11	12	13	14	Final
AP	—	—	—	—	—	—	—	RV	RV	23	19	RV	—	—	—	—
Coaches	—	—	—	—	—	—	RV	RV	RV	23	19	RV	RV	—	—	—
CFP	Not released									—	—	—	—	—	—	Not released
