= Josh Aldridge =

American football coach (born 1989)

Current position
- Title: Defensive coordinator
- Team: South Florida
- Conference: American

Biographical details
- Born: October 13, 1989 (age 36); Jackson, Tennessee, U.S.

Playing career
- 2008–2011: Harding
- Position: Defensive lineman

Coaching career (HC unless noted)
- 2013: Lindenwood (GA)
- 2013: Ouachita Baptist (DL)
- 2014–2017: West Georgia (DL/RC)
- 2018: Lenoir–Rhyne (DC/LB)
- 2019–2021: Liberty (DL)
- 2022: Liberty (co-DC/LB)
- 2022: Liberty (interim HC)
- 2023: Auburn (LB)
- 2024: Auburn (DE)
- 2025: East Carolina (DC/LB)
- 2026–present: South Florida (DC)

Head coaching record
- Overall: 0–1
- Bowls: 0–1

Josh Aldridge (born October 13, 1989) is an American college football coach and former player who is currently the defensive coordinator for South Florida. He played college football at Harding and has previously been a coach at Lindenwood, Ouachita Baptist, West Georgia, Lenoir–Rhyne,Liberty, and Auburn. Aldridge served as the interim head football coach at Liberty for the 2022 Boca Raton Bowl.

== Early life and education ==
Aldridge was born on October 13, 1989, in Jackson, Tennessee. He attended Jackson Christian School where he was a starter in football for three years. As a junior, he helped them win the Class 1A State Championship while being named all-state and the Region 8-1A Defensive Player of the Year, after posting 141 tackles and nine sacks. He was recruited by several NCAA Division I football schools, including Middle Tennessee, Western Kentucky, and Abilene Christian, but ended up attending Division II Harding.

As a true freshman at Harding in 2008, Aldridge redshirted. He became a starter as a sophomore in 2009, appearing in 11 games at defensive end and recording 35 tackles, including 6.5 for-loss, placing second on the team. In his collegiate debut, he posted eight tackles against Missouri Southern.

As a junior in 2010, Aldridge started nine games, missing only one, and tallied 25 tackles, 6.0 for-loss, and 4.5 sacks. He also blocked a field goal and recorded his first career interception that season. After posting two strip sacks and four tackles (including three for-loss) in Harding's upset of North Alabama on November 13, Aldridge was named national Division II player of the week.

Aldridge started all 11 games in his senior year, 2011, and recorded 45 tackles, a conference-leading 7.5 sacks, a team-leading 12.5 TFLs, and two forced fumbles. He also blocked one kick, being named second-team All-Great American Conference (GAC) at the end of the year. He graduated in 2012 with a degree in social sciences, and was a finalist for the William V. Campbell Trophy before graduating.

== Coaching career ==
Aldridge began his coaching career in 2013, as a graduate assistant at Lindenwood and the defensive line coach at Ouachita Baptist. In 2014, he was hired by former West Alabama coach Will Hall, who he had played against several times at Harding, to be the defensive line coach at West Georgia. He spent four seasons (2014 to 2017) serving in that position, as well as serving as their recruiting coordinator. He helped West Georgia win one Gulf South Conference (GSC) championship, earn three playoff berths, and record back-to-back 12-win seasons.

In 2018, Aldridge served as the defensive coordinator and linebackers coach at Lenoir–Rhyne. After one season there, he was hired by Hugh Freeze to be the defensive line coach at the FBS school Liberty, being Freeze's first hiring. In 2021, he was a nominee for the Broyles Award, given to the best assistant coach in the nation. He received a promotion to co-defensive coordinator as well as a shift to linebackers coach in early 2022. After Freeze was signed away by Auburn with one game remaining in 2022, the Boca Raton Bowl, Aldridge was named Liberty's interim head coach. They lost to Toledo, 19–21, after which Aldridge left Liberty and joined Freeze at Auburn as linebackers coach.

== Head coaching record ==
Year	Team	Overall	Conference	Standing	Bowl/playoffs
Liberty Flames (Independent) (2022)
2022	Liberty	0–1	0–0		L Boca Raton
Liberty:		0–1	0–0		
Total:		0–1			
