= 2022 Akron Zips football team =

American college football season

2022 Akron Zips football
- Conference: Mid-American Conference
- East Division
- Record: 2–10 (1–7 MAC)
- Head coach: Joe Moorhead (1st season)
- Offensive scheme: Spread
- Defensive coordinator: Tim Tibesar (1st season)
- Base defense: Multiple 4–2–5
- Home stadium: InfoCision Stadium–Summa Field

2022 Mid-American Conference football standings
| | Conf. | | | Overall |
| Team | W | | L | W | | L |
|---|---|---|---|---|---|---|
East Division
| Ohio xy | 7 | – | 1 | 10 | – | 4 |
| Buffalo | 5 | – | 3 | 7 | – | 6 |
| Bowling Green | 5 | – | 3 | 6 | – | 7 |
| Miami (OH) | 4 | – | 4 | 6 | – | 7 |
| Kent State | 4 | – | 4 | 5 | – | 7 |
| Akron | 1 | – | 7 | 2 | – | 10 |
West Division
| Toledo xy$ | 5 | – | 3 | 9 | – | 5 |
| Eastern Michigan x | 5 | – | 3 | 9 | – | 4 |
| Western Michigan | 4 | – | 4 | 5 | – | 7 |
| Ball State | 3 | – | 5 | 5 | – | 7 |
| Central Michigan | 3 | – | 5 | 4 | – | 8 |
| Northern Illinois | 2 | – | 6 | 3 | – | 9 |
Championship: Toledo 17, Ohio 7
$ – Conference champion; x – Division champion/co-champions; y – Championship game participant; Rankings from AP Poll

The 2022 Akron Zips football team represented the University of Akron as a member of the East Division of the Mid-American Conference (MAC) during the 2022 NCAA Division I FBS football season. Led by first-year head coach Joe Moorhead, the Zips played home games at InfoCision Stadium in Akron, Ohio.

== Schedule ==
| Date | Time | Opponent | Site | TV | Result | Attendance |
|---|---|---|---|---|---|---|
| September 1 | 6:00 p.m. | Saint Francis (PA)* | InfoCision Stadium–Summa Field; Akron, OH | ESPN3 | W 30–23 ^{OT} | 8,752 |
| September 10 | 4:00 p.m. | at No. 14 Michigan State* | Spartan Stadium; East Lansing, MI | BTN | L 0–52 | 70,079 |
| September 17 | 7:00 p.m. | at No. 15 Tennessee* | Neyland Stadium; Knoxville, TN | ESPN+/SECN+ | L 6–63 | 101,915 |
| September 24 | 6:00 p.m. | at Liberty* | Williams Stadium; Lynchburg, VA | ESPN+ | L 12–21 | 20,004 |
| October 1 | 3:30 p.m. | Bowling Green^{†} | InfoCision Stadium–Summa Field; Akron, OH | ESPN+ | L 28–31 | 8,093 |
| October 8 | 2:00 p.m. | at Ohio | Peden Stadium; Athens, OH | ESPN+ | L 34–55 | 23,108 |
| October 15 | 12:00 p.m. | Central Michigan | InfoCision Stadium–Summa Field; Akron, OH | ESPN+ | L 21–28 | 14,814 |
| October 22 | 12:00 p.m. | at Kent State | Dix Stadium; Kent, OH (Wagon Wheel) | ESPN+ | L 27–33 | 20,472 |
| October 29 | 12:00 p.m. | Miami (OH) | InfoCision Stadium–Summa Field; Akron, OH | ESPN+ | L 9–27 | 11,749 |
| November 8 | 7:00 p.m. | Eastern Michigan | InfoCision Stadium–Summa Field; Akron, OH | CBSSN | L 28–34 | 12,589 |
| November 26 | 1:30 p.m. | at Northern Illinois | Huskie Stadium; DeKalb, IL | ESPN3 | W 44–12 | 6,288 |
| December 2 | 1:00 p.m. | at Buffalo | University at Buffalo Stadium; Amherst, NY | ESPN+ | L 22–23 | 12,247 |
*Non-conference game; ^{†}Homecoming; Rankings from AP Poll released prior to the game; All times are in Eastern time

== Game summaries ==
=== Saint Francis (PA) ===
| | 1 | 2 | 3 | 4 | OT | Total |
|---|---|---|---|---|---|---|
| Red Flash | 3 | 10 | 3 | 7 | 0 | 23 |
| Zips | 3 | 7 | 7 | 6 | 7 | 30 |

| Statistics | Saint Francis | Akron |
|---|---|---|
| First downs | 18 | 19 |
| Total yards | 453 | 384 |
| Rushing yards | 189 | 98 |
| Passing yards | 264 | 286 |
| Turnovers | 1 | 0 |
| Time of possession | 32:46 | 27:14 |

| Team | Category | Player | Statistics |
|---|---|---|---|
| Saint Francis | Passing | Justin Sliwoski | 11/17, 162 yards, 1 INT |
| Saint Francis | Rushing | Damon Horton | 18 carries, 86 yards, 1 TD |
| Saint Francis | Receiving | Dawson Snyder | 3 receptions, 92 yards |
| Akron | Passing | DJ Irons | 22/37, 286 yards, 2 TD |
| Akron | Rushing | Cam Wiley | 21 carries, 84 yards, 2 TD |
| Akron | Receiving | Shocky Jacques-Louis | 8 receptions, 122 yards, 1 TD |

=== At No. 14 Michigan State ===
Week Two: Akron at No. 14 Michigan State – Game summary

| Quarter | 1 | 2 | 3 | 4 | Total |
|---|---|---|---|---|---|
| Zips | 0 | 0 | 0 | 0 | 0 |
| No. 14 Spartans | 14 | 10 | 28 | 0 | 52 |

at Spartan Stadium • East Lansing, MI

- Date: September 10, 2022
- Game time: 4:05 p.m.
- Game weather: 85 °F (29 °C), Cloudy, Wind: SW 7 mph (11 km/h)
- Game attendance: 70,079
- Referee: Brian Banks
- TV announcers (BTN): Chris Vosters (play-by-play), Matt Millen (analyst)

Game information

First Quarter

- (08:29) MSU TD: Jarek Broussard 1-yard run (Jack Stone kick)
  MSU 7–0; 6 plays, 59 yards, 2:13
- (02:26) MSU TD: Jalen Berger 1-yard run (Jack Stone kick)
  MSU 14–0; 8 plays, 45 yards, 2:37

Second Quarter

- (02:16) MSU TD: Jalen Berger 1-yard run (Jack Stone kick)
  MSU 21–0; 8 plays, 56 yards, 2:58
- (00:01) MSU FG: Jack Stone 43-yard field goal
  MSU 24–0; 8 plays, 68 yards 00:56

Third Quarter

- (13:26) MSU TD: Tre Mosley 16-yard pass from Noah Kim (Jack Stone kick)
  MSU 31–0; 2 plays, 20 yards, 0:37
- (07:58) MSU TD: Jarek Broussard 2-yard run (Jack Stone kick)
  MSU 38–0; 9 plays, 69 yards, 3:52
- (03:59) MSU TD Jalen Berger 2-yard run (Jack Stone kick)
  MSU 45–0; 7 plays, 60 yards, 3;01
- (00:21) MSU TD: Elijah Collins 10-yard run (Jack Stone kick)
  MSU 52–0; 6 plays, 37 yard, 2:28

Passing

- AKR – DJ Irons: 9/13, 123 yards
- MSU – Payton Thorne: 18/28, 212 yards, 2 INT

Rushing

- AKR – DJ Irons: 7 carries, 30 yards
- MSU – Jalen Berger: 17 carries, 107 yards, 3 TD

Receiving

- AKR – George Daniel: 4 receptions, 44 yards
- MSU – Jayden Reed: 6 receptions, 76 yards

=== At No. 15 Tennessee ===
Game Three: Akron Zips (1–1) at No. 15 Tennessee Volunteers (2–0) – Game summary

| Quarter | 1 | 2 | 3 | 4 | Total |
|---|---|---|---|---|---|
| Zips | 0 | 0 | 3 | 3 | 6 |
| No. 15 Volunteers | 14 | 14 | 21 | 14 | 63 |

at Neyland Stadium, Knoxville, TN

- Date: September 17
- Game time: 7:00 p.m.
- Game weather: Clear, 80 °F (27 °C)
- Game attendance: 101,915
- Referee: Ken Williamson
- TV announcers (SECN+/ESPN+): Drew Carter (play-by-play), Aaron Murray (color) and Ashley Stroehlein (sidelines)

=== At Liberty ===
| | 1 | 2 | 3 | 4 | Total |
|---|---|---|---|---|---|
| Zips | 0 | 3 | 3 | 6 | 12 |
| Flames | 7 | 7 | 0 | 7 | 21 |

=== Bowling Green ===
| | 1 | 2 | 3 | 4 | Total |
|---|---|---|---|---|---|
| Falcons | 10 | 14 | 0 | 7 | 31 |
| Zips | 7 | 7 | 7 | 7 | 28 |

=== At Ohio ===
Akron Zips (1–4, 0–1) vs. Ohio Bobcats (2–3, 0–1)

| Quarter | 1 | 2 | 3 | 4 | Total |
|---|---|---|---|---|---|
| Akron | 0 | 13 | 7 | 14 | 34 |
| Ohio | 14 | 14 | 20 | 7 | 55 |

at Peden Stadium • Athens, OH

- Date: Saturday, October 9, 2022
- Game time: 2:00 p.m. EDT
- Game weather: sunny, Temperature:56 °F (13 °C)
- Game attendance: 23,108
- Referee: Jeremy Valentine
- TV announcers (ESPN3): Anthony Lima, Rob Generelli
- box score,Ohio notes

Game information

First Quarter

- (14:48) OHIO – Wiglusz, Sam 75 yd pass from Rourke, Kurtis (Vakos, Nathanial kick) 1 plays, 75 yards, TOP 00:12 (OHIO 7–0)
- (03:31) OHIO – McCormick, Nolan 8 yd run (Vakos, Nathanial kick) 12 plays, 63 yards, TOP 07:06 (OHIO 14–0)

Second Quarter

- (13:26) AKR – Perez, Noah 25 yd field goal 10 plays, 61 yards, TOP 04:59 (OHIO 14–3)
- (09:29) OHIO – Bangura, Sieh 12 yd run (Vakos, Nathanial kick) 7 plays, 89 yards, TOP 03:50 (OHIO 21–3)
- (06:28) AKR – Perez, Noah 42 yd field goal 7 plays, 51 yards, TOP 03:01 (OHIO 21–6)
- (00:45) AKR – Irons, DJ 18 yd run (Perez, Noah kick) 9 plays, 83 yards, TOP 01:46 (OHIO 21–13)
- (00:00) OHIO – Bangura, Sieh 1 yd run (Vakos, Nathanial kick) 6 plays, 78 yards, TOP 00:41 (OHIO 28–13)

Third Quarter

- (11:38) AKR – Price III, Clyde 4 yd run (Perez, Noah kick) 10 plays, 65 yards, TOP 03:22 (OHIO 28–20)
- (09:14) OHIO – Wiglusz, Sam 30 yd pass from Rourke, Kurtis (Vakos, Nathanial kick) 5 plays, 60 yards, TOP 02:16 (OHIO 35–20)
- (05:13) OHIO – Bangura, Sieh 25 yd pass from Rourke, Kurtis (kick failed) 6 plays, 65 yards, TOP 02:13 (OHIO 41–20)
- (04:45) OHIO – McCrory, Jack 13 yd fumble recovery (Vakos, Nathanial kick) (OHIO 48–20)

Fourth Quarter

- (14:54) AKR – Price III, Clyde 3 yd run (Perez, Noah kick) 10 plays, 72 yards, TOP 04:54 (OHIO 48–27)
- (05:24) AKR – Price III, Clyde 1 yd run (Perez, Noah kick) 13 plays, 83 yards, TOP 06:24 (OHIO 48–34)
- (03:08) OHIO – Bangura, Sieh 6 yd run (Vakos, Nathanial kick) 4 plays, 48 yards, TOP 02:15 (OHIO 55–34)

| Statistics | AKR | OHIO |
|---|---|---|
| First downs | 33 | 25 |
| Total yards | 473 | 561 |
| Rushes/yards | 26/60 | 31/134 |
| Passing yards | 418 | 427 |
| Passing: Comp–Att–Int | 43–54–1 | 24–27–0 |
| Time of possession | 32:24 | 27:36 |

| Team | Category | Player | Statistics |
|---|---|---|---|
| Akron | Passing | DJ Irons | 43/54, 418 yards, 3 TD, 1 INT |
| Akron | Rushing | Clyde Price III | 14 rushes, 47 yards, 3 TD |
| Akron | Receiving | Shocky Jacques-Louis | 11 receptions, 152 yards, 2 TD |
| Ohio | Passing | Kurtis Rourke | 24/27, 427 yards, 3 TD |
| Ohio | Rushing | Sieh Bangura | 16 rushes, 92 yards, 3 TD |
| Ohio | Receiving | Sam Wiglusz | 7 receptions, 144 yards, 2 TD |

=== Central Michigan ===
| | 1 | 2 | 3 | 4 | Total |
|---|---|---|---|---|---|
| Zips | 7 | 0 | 7 | 7 | 21 |
| Chippewas | 7 | 7 | 7 | 7 | 28 |

=== At Kent State ===
| | 1 | 2 | 3 | 4 | Total |
|---|---|---|---|---|---|
| Zips | 7 | 10 | 7 | 3 | 27 |
| Golden Flashes | 0 | 21 | 9 | 3 | 33 |

=== Miami (OH) ===
| | 1 | 2 | 3 | 4 | Total |
|---|---|---|---|---|---|
| RedHawks | 7 | 10 | 0 | 10 | 27 |
| Zips | 0 | 3 | 0 | 6 | 9 |

=== Eastern Michigan ===
| | 1 | 2 | 3 | 4 | Total |
|---|---|---|---|---|---|
| Eagles | 10 | 14 | 7 | 3 | 34 |
| Zips | 7 | 7 | 0 | 14 | 28 |

=== At Northern Illinois ===
| | 1 | 2 | 3 | 4 | Total |
|---|---|---|---|---|---|
| Zips | 0 | 20 | 7 | 17 | 44 |
| Huskies | 6 | 0 | 3 | 3 | 12 |

=== At Buffalo ===
| | 1 | 2 | 3 | 4 | Total |
|---|---|---|---|---|---|
| Zips | 9 | 7 | 0 | 6 | 22 |
| Bulls | 0 | 10 | 7 | 6 | 23 |

== Roster ==
2022 Akron Zips football team roster
Players
Coaches
Offense

| Pos. | # | Name | Class |
|---|---|---|---|
| QB | 0 | D. J. Irons | Jr |
| RB | 1 | Cam Wiley | So |
| RB | 2 | Anthony Williams Jr. | So |
| QB | 3 | Dijon Jennings | Fr |
| WR | 4 | Bobby Golden | Fr |
| TE | 5 | T. J. Banks | Jr |
| RB | 6 | Jonzell Norrils | So |
| WR | 7 | Alex Adams | So |
| QB | 8 | Ryan Jankowski | So |
| TE | 10 | Marquell Darnell | Fr |
| TE | 11 | Nik Ognenovic | Sr |
| WR | 16 | Tony Grimes Jr. | So |
| WR | 18 | Shocky Jacques-Louis | Sr |
| WR | 19 | Clayton Bone | Fr |
| RB | 22 | Charles Kellom | Fr |
| TE | 25 | Tristian Bank | So |
| RB | 26 | Dae'Vontay Latimer | So |
| TE | 28 | Grant Gainer | So |
| WR | 30 | Jalen Knight | So |
| RB | 35 | Blake Hester | So |
| TE | 49 | Jacob Shaffer | So |
| OL | 51 | Jourden Hale-Frater | Fr |
| OL | 52 | Kamarii Landers | Fr |
| OL | 54 | Tyhler Williams | Fr |
| OL | 63 | Alex Robarge | So |
| OL | 65 | Tony Georges | So |
| OL | 66 | Ryan Beckman | So |
| OL | 70 | Caleb Herring | So |
| OL | 71 | Max Banes | Jr |
| OL | 72 | Colin Lyons | So |
| OL | 73 | Owen Murphy | So |
| OL | 74 | Ronan Chambers | So |
| OL | 75 | Jordan Daniels | So |
| OL | 76 | Nate Williams | So |
| OL | 77 | Xavior Gray | So |
| OL | 78 | Brian Kilbane | Fr |
| WR | 80 | Jasaiah Gathings | So |
| WR | 81 | Shawn Naim | So |
| WR | 82 | Jameel Williamson | So |
| WR | 83 | Myles Walker | So |
| TE | 87 | Brycen Yarmo | Jr |

Defense

| Pos. | # | Name | Class |
|---|---|---|---|
| DL | 0 | Bryce Wilson | Jr |
| OLB | 2 | Corey Thomas Jr. | So |
| DL | 3 | Zach Morton | Sr |
| DL | 4 | Ryan Johnson | Jr |
| DL | 5 | Curtis Harper | Sr |
| DL | 6 | Curtis Fann Jr. | So |
| OLB | 7 | Julian Richardson | Jr |
| S | 8 | Jaylen Kelly-Powell | Sr |
| MLB | 9 | Jeslord Boateng | Jr |
| DL | 10 | Quevan Lawson | So |
| DL | 11 | Nazir Sy | Jr |
| DB | 12 | Charles Amankwaa | Sr |
| CB | 13 | Chu Ogbonna | Sr |
| S | 14 | Noel Roach | So |
| DB | 15 | K. J. Martin | Jr |
| OLB | 17 | Juan Jarrett | So |
| S | 19 | MyJaden Horton | So |
| LB | 20 | Brian McCoy | Fr |
| DB | 21 | Cam Threatt | So |
| S | 22 | Adetutu Daranijo | Jr |
| CB | 23 | Ronald Jackson Jr. | So |
| LB | 25 | Tim Terry | Sr |
| LB | 27 | Bubba Arslanian | Sr |
| CB | 29 | Jalen Hooks | Sr |
| S | 30 | Joe Malchesky | So |
| CB | 34 | Tyson Durant | So |
| CB | 35 | Darrian Lewis | So |
| S | 38 | Rishad Hence | So |
| S | 39 | DiMarco Johnson | So |
| DB | 43 | Logan Day | Sr |
| DL | 44 | Victor Jones | Sr |
| OLB | 45 | Ryan McClain | Sr |
| DB | 47 | Dontae Pollard | So |
| DB | 48 | Kavari Adams | Jr |
| S | 49 | Sean Conroy | Jr |
| MLB | 51 | Luke Bauer | So |
| LB | 52 | Zach DiLauro | Jr |
| LB | 53 | Camari Harris | So |
| DL | 54 | Kiawan Murphy | Fr |
| LB | 58 | Emmett Hanna | Fr |
| MLB | 59 | Andrew Behm | So |
| DL | 90 | Angelo Howze | Sr |
| DL | 93 | Bennett Adler | So |
| DL | 95 | Andre Proffitt | So |
| DL | 97 | Janirr Wade | So |
| DL | 98 | Logan Hawkins | Jr |
| DL | 99 | Devon Robinson | Jr |

Special teams

| Pos. | # | Name | Class |
|---|---|---|---|
| K | 12 | Cory Smigel | Jr |
| LS | 41 | Tyler Rieger | So |
| P | 42 | Kyle Romenick | So |
| LS | 50 | Kyle Bauman | Jr |

Head coach

- Joe Moorhead

Coordinators/assistant coaches

- Tim Tibesar (Defensive coordinator / linebackers)
- Allen Tucker (special teams coordinator)
- Reno Ferri (Tight ends)
- Terry Richardson (running backs)
- Tre' Bell (cornerbacks)
- Winston DeLattiboudere III (defensive line)
- Billy Fessler (Co-Pass Game coordinator / quarterbacks)
- David Gilbertson (Co-Pass Game coordinator / Wide receivers)
- Neal Renna (safeties)
- Joel Rodriguez (Run Game coordinator / Offensive line)

Legend

- (C) Team captain
- (S) Suspended
- (I) Ineligible
- Injured
- Redshirt

Roster
Last update: June 26, 2022
