= 2022 UMass Minutemen football team =

American college football season

2022 UMass Minutemen football
- Conference: Independent
- Record: 1–11
- Head coach: Don Brown (6th season)
- Offensive coordinator: Steve Casula (1st season)
- Offensive scheme: Multiple pro
- Defensive coordinator: Keith Dudzinski (8th season)
- Base defense: 4–3 or 4–2–5
- Home stadium: Warren McGuirk Alumni Stadium

2022 NCAA Division I FBS independents football records
| | Conf. | | | Overall |
| Team | W | | L | W | | L |
|---|---|---|---|---|---|---|
| No. 18 Notre Dame | | – | | 9 | – | 4 |
| Liberty | | – | | 8 | – | 5 |
| BYU | | – | | 8 | – | 5 |
| New Mexico State | | – | | 7 | – | 6 |
| Army | | – | | 6 | – | 6 |
| UConn | | – | | 6 | – | 7 |
| UMass | | – | | 1 | – | 11 |
Rankings from AP Poll

The 2022 UMass Minutemen football team represented the University of Massachusetts Amherst in the 2022 NCAA Division I FBS football season. The Minutemen played their home games at Warren McGuirk Alumni Stadium in Hadley, Massachusetts, and competed as an FBS independent. They were led by sixth-year head coach Don Brown, his first season back coaching the program since the 2008 season.

== Schedule ==
UMass hosted five home games and traveled to seven different away games during the 2022 season.

| Date | Time | Opponent | Site | TV | Result | Attendance |
|---|---|---|---|---|---|---|
| September 3 | 7:00 p.m. | at Tulane | Yulman Stadium; New Orleans, LA | ESPN+ | L 10–42 | 15,101 |
| September 10 | 7:00 p.m. | at Toledo | Glass Bowl; Toledo, OH | ESPN+ | L 10–55 | 20,147 |
| September 17 | 3:30 p.m. | Stony Brook | Warren McGuirk Alumni Stadium; Hadley, MA | ESPN3 | W 20–3 | 10,011 |
| September 24 | 2:00 p.m. | at Temple | Lincoln Financial Field; Philadelphia, PA | ESPN+ | L 0–28 | 14,033 |
| October 1 | 2:00 p.m. | at Eastern Michigan | Rynearson Stadium; Ypsilanti, MI | ESPN+ | L 13–20 | 16,478 |
| October 8 | 3:30 p.m. | Liberty | Warren McGuirk Alumni Stadium; Hadley, MA | ESPN+ | L 24–42 | 11,217 |
| October 15 | 1:00 p.m. | Buffalo | Warren McGuirk Alumni Stadium; Hadley, MA (rivalry) | ESPN3 | L 7–34 | 13,378 |
| October 29 | 3:30 p.m. | New Mexico State^{†} | Warren McGuirk Alumni Stadium; Hadley, MA | ESPN3 | L 13–23 | 9,274 |
| November 4 | 7:00 p.m. | at UConn | Rentschler Field; East Hartford, CT (rivalry) | CBSSN | L 10–27 | 23,430 |
| November 12 | 2:00 p.m. | at Arkansas State | Centennial Bank Stadium; Jonesboro, AR | ESPN3 | L 33–35 | 14,354 |
| November 19 | 12:00 p.m. | at Texas A&M | Kyle Field; College Station, TX | ESPN+/SECN+ | L 3–20 | 90,177 |
| November 26 | 12:00 p.m. | Army | Warren McGuirk Alumni Stadium; Hadley, MA | ESPN+ | L 7–44 | 10,119 |
^{†}Homecoming; All times are in Eastern time

== Awards and honors ==
Starting running back Ellis Merriweather was nominated to the Maxwell Award Preseason Watch List and the ShrineBowl1000 preseason List, as well as teammates Josh Wallace and Billy Wooden.

== Game summaries ==
=== at Tulane ===
UMass Minutemen (0–0) vs Tulane Green Wave (0–0) – Game summary

| Quarter | 1 | 2 | 3 | 4 | Total |
|---|---|---|---|---|---|
| Minutemen | 0 | 10 | 0 | 0 | 10 |
| Green Wave | 7 | 14 | 21 | 0 | 42 |

at Yulman Stadium • New Orleans, LA

- Date: September 3, 2022
- Game time: 6:00 p.m.
- Game weather: Rainy, 81 °F (27 °C)
- Game attendance: 15,101
- Referee: Tim Rich
- TV announcers (ESPN+): Jack Benjamin (play-by-play), Brian Kinchen (analyst)

Game information

First quarter

- (8:37) TUL – Tyjae Spears 6-yard run, Kriston Esnard kick (Drive: 6 plays, 36 yards, 2:53; Tulane 7–0)

Second quarter

- (14:56) UMASS – Gino Campiotti 4-yard run, Cameron Carson kick (Drive: 12 plays, 49 yards, 5:45; Tied 7–7)
- (8:31) TUL – Tyjae Spears 1-yard run, Kriston Esnard kick (Drive: 13 plays, 77 yards, 6:25; Tulane 14–7)
- (9:30) TUL – Tyjae Spears 4-yard run, Kriston Esnard kick (Drive: 3 plays, 36 yards, 1:03; Tulane 21–7)
- (9:30) UMASS – Cameron Carson 21-yard field goal (Drive: 18 plays, 66 yards, 5:51; Tulane 21–10)

Third quarter

- (9:30) TUL – Michael Pratt 20-yard run, Kriston Esnard kick (Drive: 5 plays, 65 yards, 2:23; Tulane 28–10)
- (9:30) TUL – Duece Watts 31-yard pass from Michael Pratt, Kriston Esnard kick (Drive: 5 plays, 62 yards, 2:19; Tulane 35–10)
- (9:30) TUL – Lawrence Keys II 2-yard pass from Michael Pratt, Kriston Esnard kick (Drive: 7 plays, 27 yards, 3:04; Tulane 42–10)

Fourth quarter

None

| Statistics | UMASS | TUL |
|---|---|---|
| First downs | 14 | 20 |
| Total yards | 217 | 369 |
| Rushes/yards | 58–200 | 39–196 |
| Passing yards | 17 | 173 |
| Passing: Comp–Att–Int | 4–11–3 | 13–22–0 |
| Time of possession | 33:15 | 26:45 |

| Team | Category | Player | Statistics |
|---|---|---|---|
| UMass | Passing | Gino Campiotti | 2/6, 12 yards, 2 INT |
| UMass | Rushing | Tim Baldwin Jr. | 13 carries, 65 yards |
| UMass | Receiving | George Johnson III | 1 reception, 11 yards |
| Tulane | Passing | Michael Pratt | 12/20, 164 yards, 2 TD |
| Tulane | Rushing | Tyjae Spears | 12 carries, 57 yards, 3 TD |
| Tulane | Receiving | Jha'Quan Jackson | 1 reception, 34 yards |

=== at UConn ===
UMass Minutemen at UConn Huskies – Game summary

| Quarter | 1 | 2 | 3 | 4 | Total |
|---|---|---|---|---|---|
| Minutemen | 3 | 7 | 0 | 0 | 10 |
| Huskies | 7 | 6 | 7 | 7 | 27 |

at Pratt & Whitney Stadium at Rentschler Field • East Hartford, Connecticut

- Date: November 4
- Game time: 7:02 p.m.
- Game weather: Temperature: 61 °F (16 °C) • Weather: Clear
- Game attendance: 23,430
- Referee: Mike Roche
- TV announcers (CBSSN): Meghan McPeak (play-by-play), Christian Fauria (color analyst), and Justin Walters (sideline)
- Box Score

Game information

First quarter

- MASS – Cameron Carson 23-yard field goal, 4:43. Minutemen 3–0. Drive: 8 plays, 75 yards, TOP 04:29
- CONN – Devontae Houston 75 yd run (Noe Ruelas kick), 4:32. Huskies 7–3. Drive: 1 plays, 75 yards, TOP 00:11

Second quarter

- CONN – Noe Ruelas 23-yard field goal, 9:23. Huskies 10–3. Drive: 14 plays, 52 yards, TOP 05:37
- MASS – Cam Sullivan-Brown 53 yd pass from Brady Olson (Cameron Carson kick), 6:51. Tied 10–10. Drive: 5 plays, 70 yards, TOP 02:26
- CONN – Noe Ruelas 26-yard field goal, 0:59. Huskies 13–10. Drive: 6 plays, 30 yards, TOP 01:17

Third quarter

- CONN – Victor Rosa 5 yd run (Noe Ruelas kick), 4:55. Huskies 20–10. Drive: 4 plays, 42 yards, TOP 01:34

Fourth quarter

- CONN – Victor Rosa 12 yd run (Noe Ruelas kick), 6:54. Huskies 27–10. Drive: 9 plays, 74 yards, TOP 05:11

Top passers

- CONN – Zion Turner – 6/13, 60 yards
- MASS – Brady Olson – 12/19, 155 yards

Top rushers

- CONN – Victor Rosa – 17 rushes, 87 yards, 2 TDs
- MASS – Ellis Merriweather – 12 rushes, 33 yards

Top receivers

- CONN – Justin Joly – 2 receptions, 33 yards
- MASS – Cam Sullivan-Brown – 5 receptions, 124 yards, 1 TD

Top defense

- CONN – Durante Jones – 14 tackles
- MASS – Tyler Rudolph – 10 tackles

| Statistics | UConn | UMass |
|---|---|---|
| First downs | 18 | 18 |
| Total yards | 334 | 351 |
| Rushing yards | 274 | 85 |
| Passing yards | 60 | 266 |
| Turnovers | 0 | 2 |
| Time of possession | 30:14 | 29:46 |

=== at Texas A&M ===
UMass Minutemen at Texas A&M Aggies – Game summary

| Quarter | 1 | 2 | 3 | 4 | Total |
|---|---|---|---|---|---|
| Minutemen | 0 | 3 | 0 | 0 | 3 |
| Aggies | 3 | 7 | 3 | 7 | 20 |

at Kyle Field, College Station, Texas

- Date: November 19
- Game time: 12:00 p.m. EST
- Game weather: Rain, 39 °F (4 °C)
- Game attendance: 90,177
- Referee: Wayne Winkler
- TV announcers (ESPN+/SECN+): Kevin Brown and Hutson Mason

Game information
First quarter
- TAMU – Randy Bond 27-yard field goal, 10:58. Aggies 3–0. Drive: 9 plays, 55 yards, 3:56.

Second quarter

- MASS – Cameron Carson 25-yard field goal, 14:06. Tied 3–3. Drive: 13 plays, 72 yards, 5:45.
- TAMU – Noah Thomas 22-yard pass from Conner Weigman (Randy Bond kick), 5:56. Aggies 10–3. Drive: 4 plays, 47 yards, 1:56.

Third quarter

- TAMU – Randy Bond 35-yard field goal, 7:49. Aggies 13–3. Drive: 9 plays, 46 yards, 3:56.

Fourth quarter

- TAMU – Le'Veon Moss 12-yard run (Randy Bond kick), 5:10. Aggies 20–3. Drive: 4 plays, 36 yards, 1:48.

| Statistics | MASS | TAMU |
|---|---|---|
| First downs | 10 | 16 |
| Total yards | 168 | 398 |
| Rushing yards | 113 | 207 |
| Passing yards | 55 | 191 |
| Turnovers | 1 | 3 |
| Time of possession | 32:23 | 27:37 |

| Team | Category | Player | Statistics |
|---|---|---|---|
| UMass | Passing | Brady Olson | 9/22, 55 yards |
| UMass | Rushing | Kay'Ron Adams | 14 rushes, 58 yards |
| UMass | Receiving | Isaac Ross | 4 receptions, 25 yards |
| Texas A&M | Passing | Conner Weigman | 11/19, 191 yards, TD |
| Texas A&M | Rushing | Le'Veon Moss | 12 rushes, 72 yards, TD |
| Texas A&M | Receiving | Moose Muhammad III | 3 receptions, 75 yards |
