= 2022 NCAA Division I FBS football season =

American college football season

2022 NCAA Division I FBS season
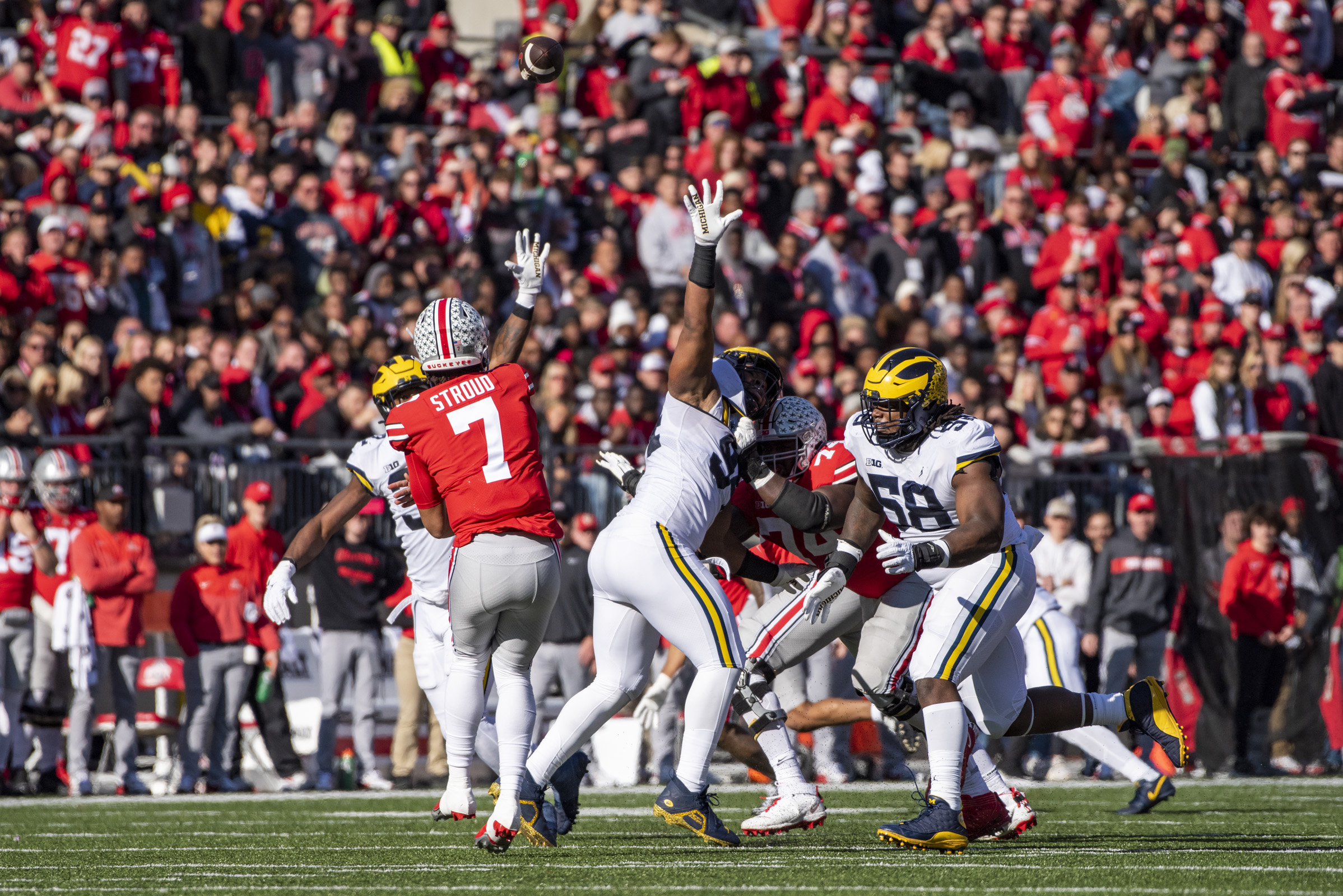
- Ohio State quarterback C. J. Stroud throwing a pass over Michigan defenders on November 26 at Ohio Stadium.
- Number of teams: 131
- Duration: August 27 – December 10, 2022
- Preseason AP No. 1: Alabama

Postseason
- Duration: December 16, 2022 – January 9, 2023
- Bowl games: 42 (Note: Bowl count includes the National Championship)
- AP Poll No. 1: Georgia
- Coaches Poll No. 1: Georgia
- Heisman Trophy: Caleb Williams, QB, USC

College Football Playoff
- 2023 College Football Playoff National Championship
- Site: SoFi Stadium (Inglewood, California)
- Champion(s): Georgia

NCAA Division I FBS football seasons
- ← 2021 2023 →

The 2022 NCAA Division I FBS football season was the 153rd season of college football in the United States organized by the National Collegiate Athletic Association (NCAA) at its highest level of competition, the Football Bowl Subdivision (FBS). The regular season began on August 27 and ended on December 10. The postseason began on December 16, and, aside from any all-star games that are scheduled, ended on January 9, 2023, with the College Football Playoff National Championship at SoFi Stadium in Inglewood, California.

The Georgia Bulldogs successfully defended their national championship when they defeated the TCU Horned Frogs, 65–7. It was the first time in the College Football Playoff era that a team won back-to-back championships. This was the ninth season of the College Football Playoff (CFP) system. The season's Heisman Trophy winner was USC Trojans quarterback Caleb Williams.

== Rule changes ==
The following rule changes were approved by the NCAA Playing Rules Oversight Panel for the 2022 season.

- In games featuring instant replay, when players are disqualified for a targeting call in the second half or in overtime (which requires a carryover penalty of sitting out the first half of the next scheduled game), an appeal process will be available to allow the National Coordinator of Officials to review tapes of the targeting penalty for consideration of not requiring the player to sit out the first half of the following game.
- Injury timeouts awarded due to "deceptive actions" during a game will also be able to be reviewed by the National Coordinator of Officials to determine what sanctions, if any, against teams who use this tactic, enforced at the conference or school level.
- Blocking below the waist will only be permitted inside the tackle box by linemen and stationary backs. Blocks below the waist outside of the tackle box are not allowed.
- The penalty for players who commit illegal blocks or contact after a signal for a fair catch is changed from 15-yards to 10-yards, and is no longer considered a personal foul.
- Defensive holding will remain a 10-yard penalty but will now always carry an automatic first down. Previously automatic first downs on defensive holding were awarded if the quarterback attempted a pass.
- Codifying the rule change made shortly after the 2021 ACC Championship Game, ball carriers who simulate a feet-first slide will be declared down at that spot. This rule has informally been referred to as the "Kenny Pickett Rule".
- Defensive players who commit unsportsmanlike conduct penalties during a pass or run play will have the 15-yard penalty enforced from the end of the run/pass like a personal foul penalty.
- Uniform rules were changed to require the sock/leg covering to go from the shoe to the bottom of the pants, similar to the NFL rule.
- Illegal touching (intentional) of a forward pass by an ineligible receiver now includes a loss of down penalty in addition to the yardage (5-yards).

== Other headlines ==
- March 1 – The Sun Belt Conference released its 2022 football schedule. Notably, the schedule included Marshall, Old Dominion, and Southern Miss, schools that had announced their departure from Conference USA and were then in a dispute with C-USA regarding their departure date, with Marshall having sued C-USA. The SBC release did not mention the dispute or the possibility that the three schools would not be able to join for the 2022 season.
- March 29—C-USA and the three aforementioned schools reached a settlement that allowed said schools to join the SBC in July 2022.
- May 18 – The NCAA Division I Council voted to approve multiple changes to football administrative rules. Among these changes:
  - Restrictions on how conferences determine which teams qualify for their conference title games were removed. The Pac-12 Conference was the first conference to scrap its divisions for the 2022 season. While it will continue its division-based scheduling model for that season, it announced that it would consider other models for future seasons.
  - All annual signing limits were removed for the 2022–23 and 2023–24 academic years. Only the overall scholarship limits (85 players receiving athletically related financial aid throughout D-I football, with 63 full scholarship equivalents in FCS) remain in place for those seasons.
  - A win over an FCS team will count toward bowl eligibility if the FCS team awards at least 80% of that subdivision's limit of 63 scholarship equivalents over a two-year rolling period, down from the previous 90%. This made permanent a change that the NCAA had made on an ad hoc basis in 2020.
  - The council made permanent a set of criteria, originally established on an ad hoc basis in 2020, for filling bowl slots in seasons when the number of bowl slots is greater than the number of teams with .500 records.
- May 20 – The Mountain West Conference announced that it would eliminate its football divisions starting with the 2023 season.
- June 10 – The American Athletic Conference and the three schools set to depart from that league (Cincinnati, Houston, UCF) announced that they had reached a buyout agreement that will allow those schools to join the Big 12 Conference in 2023.
- June 16 – The American confirmed the 2023 entry date for the six schools scheduled to join that league from Conference USA—Charlotte, Florida Atlantic, North Texas, Rice, UAB, and UTSA.
- June 28 – The ACC approved a new football schedule format after the May 18 NCAA ruling. Starting in 2023, the conference will abandon its divisional model in favor of a "3–5–5" format in which each team plays 3 permanent rivals and 5 other conference teams each season, with the non-permanent opponents rotating so that each team will play every other conference member at least once home and once away in a four-year cycle. Under this format, the championship game will feature the top two teams in the conference standings.
- June 30 – The Big Ten Conference announced that UCLA and USC would join from the Pac-12 Conference in 2024, immediately after the current Pac-12 media contracts expire.
- August 18 – The Big Ten announced a new all-sports media rights deal, running from 2023 to 2030, with Fox, CBS, and NBC that will provide the conference a reported $7 billion. By the end of the deal, each of the 16 members (including 2024 arrivals UCLA and USC) will receive as much as $100 million annually.
- August 31 – The Division I Board of Directors adopted a series of changes to transfer rules.
  - Transfer windows were adopted for all Division I sports. Student-athletes who wish to be immediately eligible at their next school must enter the NCAA transfer portal within the designated period(s) for their sport. For football, two windows were established: a 45-day window starting with the day after championship selections are made (in FBS, the College Football Playoff), and a spring window from May 1–15. Accommodations will be made for participants in the College Football Playoff National Championship.
  - Student-athletes who experience head coaching changes, or those whose athletic aid is reduced, canceled, or not renewed, may transfer outside designated windows without penalty.
  - Transferring student-athletes will be guaranteed their financial aid at their next school through graduation.
- September 2 – The Board of Managers of the College Football Playoff voted to expand the playoff from four teams to twelve teams starting in 2026, but encouraged CFP's commissioners to implement it by 2024. The model is similar to the one discussed in 2021; the six highest rated conference champions plus six at-large teams would make up the playoff.
- October 14 – Conference USA announced that Kennesaw State, currently a member of the FCS ASUN Conference, would start a transition to FBS after the 2022 football season and join C-USA in 2024.
- October 19 – Mississippi State announced that freshman offensive lineman Sam Westmoreland had died two days before his 19th birthday. The cause of death was being investigated, but foul play was not suspected.
- October 21 – San Jose State freshman running back Camdan McWright was killed when he was struck by a school bus while riding an electric scooter near the university campus. The Spartans' scheduled game for the next day against New Mexico State was postponed and was planned to be made up later in the season; however, this never occurred.
- October 26 - The Big Ten Conference released its 2023 schedules and retained the divisional alignment. The conference is expected to eliminate divisions once USC and UCLA join in 2024.
- November 5 – SMU defeated Houston 77–63, with the two teams combining for a new FBS record of 140 points in regulation. The previous record of 137 had been set when Pittsburgh defeated Syracuse 76–61 in 2016. SMU quarterback Tanner Mordecai also set school and American Athletic Conference records with 9 touchdown passes, and tied an FBS record for touchdown passes in a half with 7 in the first half.
- November 12 – Carlton Martial of Troy recorded his 546th tackle to break the Division I FBS record for most tackles in a career.
- November 13 – Three Virginia players—junior receivers Devin Chandler and Lavel Davis Jr., and junior edge rusher D'Sean Perry—were killed in a mass shooting in a parking garage on UVA's campus in Charlottesville. Junior running back Mike Hollins and another UVA student were wounded in the incident, which took place as a group of students was returning from a class field trip. Another student on the trip, former Cavaliers running back Christopher Jones Jr., was arrested the next day on multiple felony charges, including three counts of second-degree murder.
- November 16 – In the wake of the on-campus shooting three days earlier, Virginia canceled its final home game of the season against Coastal Carolina.
- November 17 – During a meeting in San Francisco, the Regents of the University of California, the governing board of the University of California system, set a date of December 14 for a special meeting to make a final determination on UCLA's planned move to the Big Ten.
- November 21 – Virginia and Virginia Tech agreed to cancel their rivalry game, originally set for November 26, in the wake of the UVA shooting. Both teams had already been eliminated from bowl eligibility.
- November 30 - The Rose Bowl signed an agreement to expand the College Football Playoff to 12 teams, clearing the way to begin the new playoff structure starting in 2024.
- December 11 – Mississippi State coach Mike Leach had been hospitalized from a personal issue.
- December 12 – In the evening, Mike Leach died "from complications due to a heart condition".
- December 14 - The UC Regents approved UCLA's move to the Big Ten. Additionally, conditions were made to mitigate athletes, such as investing $12 million in beneficial services, including nutritional support and charter flights to reduce travel time. UCLA must also pay the University of California, Berkeley an additional $2 to $10 million due to the move affecting the latter's athletic program, with the precise total being made once the Pac-12 completes its upcoming media rights deal.

== Conference realignment ==
One team played its first FBS season in 2022. James Madison started a transition from Division I FCS in 2022, joining the Sun Belt Conference. As a full Sun Belt member, it met FBS scheduling requirements in the 2022 season, allowing it to be counted as an FBS opponent for scheduling purposes and to skip the first year of the normal two-year transition process.

Three other teams joined the Sun Belt from Conference USA in 2022. Marshall, Old Dominion, and Southern Miss, while initially reported to be making said move in 2023, announced their intent to move in 2022. C-USA had insisted that all three were bound to that league through the 2022–23 school year. Following a brief legal dispute, the parties reached a settlement allowing the schools to leave at the end of June.

Team	Former conference	New conference
James Madison	CAA (FCS)	Sun Belt
Marshall	C-USA	Sun Belt
Old Dominion	C-USA	Sun Belt
Southern Miss	C-USA	Sun Belt

The 2022 season was the last for 12 FBS teams in their current conferences or as FBS independents:

Team	Current conference	Future conference
BYU	Independent	Big 12
Charlotte	C-USA	American
Cincinnati	American	Big 12
Florida Atlantic	C-USA	American
Houston	American	Big 12
Liberty	Independent	C-USA
New Mexico State	Independent	C-USA
North Texas	C-USA	American
Rice	C-USA	American
UAB	C-USA	American
UCF	American	Big 12
UTSA	C-USA	American

In addition to James Madison, two other FCS teams started transitions to FBS in the 2022 season. They will not join their future FBS conferences until 2023.

- Jacksonville State will leave the ASUN Conference for C-USA.
- Sam Houston will leave the Western Athletic Conference for C-USA.

== Stadiums ==
This was the first season for San Diego State at Snapdragon Stadium, replacing the since-demolished San Diego Stadium after playing at Dignity Health Sports Park in Carson for two seasons in 2020 and 2021. The Aztecs played their first game in the new stadium against the Arizona Wildcats on September 3, 2022.

== Kickoff games ==
Rankings reflect the AP Poll entering each week.

=== "Week Zero" ===
The regular season began on Saturday, August 27 with eleven games in Week 0.

- Aer Lingus College Football Classic (Aviva Stadium, Dublin, Ireland): Northwestern 31, Nebraska 28
- Florida State 47, Duquesne 7
- North Carolina 56, Florida A&M 24
- Illinois 38, Wyoming 6
- Vanderbilt 63, Hawaii 10
- Western Kentucky 38, Austin Peay 27
- UNLV 52, Idaho State 21
- Nevada 23, New Mexico State 12
- Utah State 31, UConn 20
- Florida Atlantic 43, Charlotte 13
- North Texas 31, UTEP 13

=== Week 1 ===
The majority (85%) of FBS teams opened the season on Labor Day weekend. Three neutral-site "kickoff" games were held.

- Chick-fil-A Kickoff:
  - No. 3 Georgia 49, No. 11 Oregon 3 (at Mercedes-Benz Stadium, Atlanta, GA)
  - No. 4 Clemson 41, Georgia Tech 10 (at Mercedes-Benz Stadium, Atlanta, GA)
- Louisiana Kickoff:
  - Florida State 24, LSU 23 (at Caesars Superdome, New Orleans, LA)

== Top 10 matchups ==
Rankings through Week 9 reflect the AP Poll. Rankings for Week 10 and beyond list College Football Playoff Rankings first and AP Poll second. Teams that were not in the top 10 in one of the two polls are noted.

=== Regular season ===
- Week 1
  - No. 2 Ohio State defeated No. 5 Notre Dame, 21–10 (Ohio Stadium, Columbus, OH)
- Week 5
  - No. 5 Clemson defeated No. 10 NC State, 30–20 (Memorial Stadium, Clemson, SC)
- Week 7
  - No. 6 Tennessee defeated No. 3 Alabama, 52–49 (Neyland Stadium, Knoxville, TN)
  - No. 5 Michigan defeated No. 10 Penn State, 41–17 (Michigan Stadium, Ann Arbor, MI)
- Week 8
  - No. 10 Oregon defeated No. 9 UCLA, 45–30 (Autzen Stadium, Eugene, OR)
- Week 10
  - No. 3 Georgia defeated No. 1 Tennessee, 27–13 (Sanford Stadium, Athens, GA)
  - No. 10 LSU defeated No. 6 Alabama, 32–31 ^{OT} (Tiger Stadium, Baton Rouge, LA)
- Week 13
  - No. 3 Michigan defeated No. 2 Ohio State, 45–23 (Ohio Stadium, Columbus, OH)
- Week 14
  - No. 10 Kansas State defeated No. 3 TCU, 31–28 ^{OT} (2022 Big 12 Championship Game, AT&T Stadium, Arlington, TX)

=== Bowl games ===
- Orange Bowl
  - No. 6 Tennessee defeated No. 7 Clemson, 31–14 (Hard Rock Stadium, Miami Gardens, FL)
- Sugar Bowl
  - No. 5 Alabama defeated No. 9 Kansas State, 45–20 (Caesars Superdome, New Orleans, LA)
- Fiesta Bowl (CFB Playoff semifinal)
  - No. 3 TCU defeated No. 2 Michigan, 51–45 (State Farm Stadium, Glendale, AZ)
- Peach Bowl (CFB Playoff semifinal)
  - No. 1 Georgia defeated No. 4 Ohio State, 42–41 (Mercedes Benz Stadium, Atlanta, GA)
- National Championship
  - No. 1 Georgia defeated No. 3 TCU, 65–7 (SoFi Stadium, Inglewood, CA)

== FCS team wins over FBS teams ==
Italics denotes FCS teams.

Date	Visiting team	Home team	Site	Result	Attendance	Ref.
September 2	William & Mary	Charlotte	Jerry Richardson Stadium • Charlotte, North Carolina	41–24	13,940	
September 3	No. 19 (FCS) Delaware	Navy	Navy–Marine Corps Memorial Stadium • Annapolis, Maryland	14–7	30,542	
September 10	Eastern Kentucky	Bowling Green	Doyt Perry Stadium • Bowling Green, Ohio	59–57 ^{7OT}	17,376	
September 10	No. 8 (FCS) Incarnate Word	Nevada	Mackay Stadium • Reno, Nevada	55–41	14,092	
September 10	No. 15 (FCS) Holy Cross	Buffalo	UB Stadium • Buffalo, New York	37–31	16,933	
September 10	No. 16 (FCS) Weber State	Utah State	Maverik Stadium • Logan, Utah	35–7	17,781	
September 17	Southern Illinois	Northwestern	Ryan Field • Evanston, Illinois	31–24	23,146	
September 24	No. 7 (FCS) Sacramento State	Colorado State	Canvas Stadium • Fort Collins, Colorado	41–10 (Note: Sacramento State was a 4.5-point favorite at kickoff.)	25,445	
^{#}Rankings from AP Poll released prior to game.

== Upsets ==
This section lists instances of unranked teams defeating AP Poll-ranked teams during the season.

=== Regular season ===
During the regular season, unranked FBS teams defeated ranked FBS teams 44 times.

- September 3, 2022
  - Florida 29, No. 7 Utah 26
- September 10, 2022
  - Appalachian State 17, No. 6 Texas A&M 14
  - Marshall 26, No. 8 Notre Dame 21
  - Washington State 17, No. 19 Wisconsin 14
  - Texas Tech 33, No. 25 Houston 30 ^{2OT}
- September 17, 2022
  - Washington 39, No. 11 Michigan State 28
  - Tulane 17, No. 14 Kansas State 10
- September 24, 2022
  - Kansas State 41, No. 6 Oklahoma 34
  - Texas Tech 37, No. 22 Texas 34 ^{OT}
  - Middle Tennessee 45, No. 25 Miami (FL) 31
- September 30, 2022
  - UCLA 40, No. 15 Washington 32
- October 1, 2022
  - Mississippi State 42, No. 17 Texas A&M 24
  - TCU 55, No. 18 Oklahoma 24
  - Purdue 20, No. 21 Minnesota 10
  - Georgia Tech 26, No. 24 Pittsburgh 21
- October 8, 2022
  - South Carolina 24, No. 13 Kentucky 14
  - Notre Dame 28, No. 16 BYU 20
  - Arizona State 45, No. 21 Washington 38
- October 15, 2022
  - Oklahoma 52, No. 19 Kansas 42
  - Georgia Southern 45, No. 25 James Madison 38
- October 22, 2022
  - LSU 45, No. 7 Ole Miss 20
- October 29, 2022
  - Louisville 48, No. 10 Wake Forest 21
  - Notre Dame 41, No. 16 Syracuse 24
  - UCF 25, No. 20 Cincinnati 21
  - Missouri 23, No. 25 South Carolina 10
- November 4, 2022
  - Washington 24, No. 24 Oregon State 21
- November 5, 2022
  - Notre Dame 35, No. 5 Clemson 14
  - Texas 34, No. 13 Kansas State 27
  - Michigan State 23, No. 14 Illinois 15
  - Kansas 37, No. 18 Oklahoma State 16
  - Pittsburgh 19, No. 22 Syracuse 9
- November 12, 2022
  - Arizona 34, No. 9 UCLA 28
  - Boston College 21, No. 17 NC State 20
  - UConn 36, No. 19 Liberty 33
  - Purdue 31, No. 21 Illinois 24
- November 19, 2022
  - South Carolina 63, No. 5 Tennessee 38
  - Georgia Tech 21, No. 13 North Carolina 17
  - Arkansas 42, No. 14 Ole Miss 27
  - Navy 17, No. 17 UCF 14
  - Oklahoma 28, No. 24 Oklahoma State 13
- November 24, 2022
  - Mississippi State 24, No. 20 Ole Miss 22
- November 25, 2022
  - NC State 30, No. 18 North Carolina 27 ^{2OT}
- November 26, 2022
  - Texas A&M 38, No. 6 LSU 23
  - South Carolina 31, No. 7 Clemson 30
  - James Madison 47, No. 23 Coastal Carolina 7

=== Bowl games ===
Rankings in this section are based on the final CFP rankings released on December 4, 2022.

- December 30, 2022
  - Pittsburgh 37, No. 18 UCLA 35 (Sun Bowl)
  - Maryland 16, No. 23 NC State 12 (Duke's Mayo Bowl)
- January 2, 2023
  - No. 16 Tulane 46, No. 10 USC 45

== Conference standings ==
2022 American Athletic Conference football standings
	Conf.			Overall
Team	W		L	W		L
No. 9 Tulane y$	7	–	1	12	–	2
UCF y	6	–	2	9	–	5
Cincinnati	6	–	2	9	–	4
SMU	5	–	3	7	–	6
Houston	5	–	3	8	–	5
East Carolina	4	–	4	8	–	5
Navy	4	–	4	4	–	8
Memphis	3	–	5	7	–	6
Tulsa	3	–	5	5	–	7
Temple	1	–	7	3	–	9
South Florida	0	–	8	1	–	11
Championship: Tulane 45, UCF 28
$ – Conference champion; y – Championship game participant; Rankings from AP Poll

2022 Atlantic Coast Conference football standings
	Conf.			Overall
Team	W		L	W		L
Atlantic Division
No. 13 Clemson xy$	8	–	0	11	–	3
No. 11 Florida State	5	–	3	10	–	3
Louisville	4	–	4	8	–	5
NC State	4	–	4	8	–	5
Syracuse	4	–	4	7	–	6
Wake Forest	3	–	5	8	–	5
Boston College	2	–	6	3	–	9
Coastal Division
North Carolina xy	6	–	2	9	–	5
Duke	5	–	3	9	–	4
No. 22 Pittsburgh	5	–	3	9	–	4
Georgia Tech	4	–	4	5	–	7
Miami (FL)	3	–	5	5	–	7
Virginia	1	–	6	3	–	7
Virginia Tech	1	–	6	3	–	8
Championship: Clemson 39, North Carolina 10
$ – Conference champion; x – Division champion/co-champions; y – Championship game participant; Rankings from AP Poll

2022 Big Ten Conference football standings
	Conf.			Overall
Team	W		L	W		L
East Division
No. 3 Michigan xy$^	9	–	0	13	–	1
No. 4 Ohio State ^	8	–	1	11	–	2
No. 7 Penn State	7	–	2	11	–	2
Maryland	4	–	5	8	–	5
Indiana	2	–	7	4	–	8
Rutgers	1	–	8	4	–	8
Michigan State†	0	–	6	0	–	7
West Division
Purdue xy	6	–	3	8	–	6
Illinois	5	–	4	8	–	5
Iowa	5	–	4	8	–	5
Minnesota	5	–	4	9	–	4
Wisconsin	4	–	5	7	–	6
Nebraska	3	–	6	4	–	8
Northwestern	1	–	8	1	–	11
Championship: Michigan 43, Purdue 22
^ – College Football Playoff participant; $ – Conference champion; x – Division champion/co-champions; y – Championship game participant; † — NCAA vacated all wins for Michigan State (5–7, 3–6); Rankings from AP Poll

2022 Big 12 Conference football standings
	Conf.			Overall
Team	W		L	W		L
No. 2 TCU y^	9	–	0	13	–	2
No. 14 Kansas State y$	7	–	2	10	–	4
No. 25 Texas	6	–	3	8	–	5
Texas Tech	5	–	4	8	–	5
Oklahoma State	4	–	5	7	–	6
Baylor	4	–	5	6	–	7
Oklahoma	3	–	6	6	–	7
Kansas	3	–	6	6	–	7
West Virginia	3	–	6	5	–	7
Iowa State	1	–	8	4	–	8
Championship: Kansas State 31, TCU 28 ^{OT}
^ – College Football Playoff participant; $ – Conference champion; y – Championship game participant; Rankings from AP Poll

2022 Conference USA football standings
	Conf.			Overall
Team	W		L	W		L
UTSA y$	8	–	0	11	–	3
Western Kentucky	6	–	2	9	–	5
North Texas y	6	–	2	7	–	7
Middle Tennessee	4	–	4	8	–	5
UAB	4	–	4	7	–	6
Florida Atlantic	4	–	4	5	–	7
Rice	3	–	5	5	–	8
UTEP	3	–	5	5	–	7
FIU	2	–	6	4	–	8
Charlotte	2	–	6	3	–	9
Louisiana Tech	2	–	6	3	–	9
Championship: UTSA 48, North Texas 27
$ – Conference champion; y – Championship game participant; Rankings from AP Poll

2022 Mid-American Conference football standings
	Conf.			Overall
Team	W		L	W		L
East Division
Ohio xy	7	–	1	10	–	4
Buffalo	5	–	3	7	–	6
Bowling Green	5	–	3	6	–	7
Miami (OH)	4	–	4	6	–	7
Kent State	4	–	4	5	–	7
Akron	1	–	7	2	–	10
West Division
Toledo xy$	5	–	3	9	–	5
Eastern Michigan x	5	–	3	9	–	4
Western Michigan	4	–	4	5	–	7
Ball State	3	–	5	5	–	7
Central Michigan	3	–	5	4	–	8
Northern Illinois	2	–	6	3	–	9
Championship: Toledo 17, Ohio 7
$ – Conference champion; x – Division champion/co-champions; y – Championship game participant; Rankings from AP Poll

2022 Mountain West Conference football standings
	Conf.			Overall
Team	W		L	W		L
Mountain Division
Boise State xy	8	–	0	10	–	4
Air Force	5	–	3	10	–	3
Wyoming	5	–	3	7	–	6
Utah State	5	–	3	6	–	7
Colorado State	3	–	5	3	–	9
New Mexico	0	–	8	2	–	10
West Division
No. 24 Fresno State xy$	7	–	1	10	–	4
San Diego State	5	–	3	7	–	6
San Jose State	5	–	3	7	–	5
UNLV	3	–	5	5	–	7
Hawaii	2	–	6	3	–	10
Nevada	0	–	8	2	–	10
Championship: Fresno State 28, Boise State 16
$ – Conference champion; x – Division champion/co-champions; y – Championship game participant; Rankings from AP Poll

2022 Pac-12 Conference football standings
	Conf.			Overall
Team	W		L	W		L
No. 12 USC y	8	–	1	11	–	3
No. 10 Utah y$	7	–	2	10	–	4
No. 8 Washington	7	–	2	11	–	2
No. 15 Oregon	7	–	2	10	–	3
No. 17 Oregon State	6	–	3	10	–	3
No. 21 UCLA	6	–	3	9	–	4
Washington State	4	–	5	7	–	6
Arizona	3	–	6	5	–	7
California	2	–	7	4	–	8
Arizona State†	1	–	7	1	–	9
Stanford	1	–	8	3	–	9
Colorado	1	–	8	1	–	11
Championship: Utah 47, USC 24
$ – Conference champion; y – Championship game participant; Rankings from AP Poll

2022 Southeastern Conference football standings
	Conf.			Overall
Team	W		L	W		L
Eastern Division
No. 1 Georgia xy$#^	8	–	0	15	–	0
No. 6 Tennessee	6	–	2	11	–	2
No. 23 South Carolina	4	–	4	8	–	5
Kentucky	3	–	5	7	–	6
Florida	3	–	5	6	–	7
Missouri	3	–	5	6	–	7
Vanderbilt	2	–	6	5	–	7
Western Division
No. 16 LSU xy	6	–	2	10	–	4
No. 5 Alabama x	6	–	2	11	–	2
No. 20 Mississippi State	4	–	4	9	–	4
Ole Miss	4	–	4	8	–	5
Arkansas	3	–	5	7	–	6
Auburn	2	–	6	5	–	7
Texas A&M	2	–	6	5	–	7
Championship: Georgia 50, LSU 30
# – College Football Playoff champion; ^ – College Football Playoff participant; $ – Conference champion; x – Division champion/co-champions; y – Championship game participant; Rankings from AP Poll

2022 Sun Belt Conference football standings
	Conf.			Overall
Team	W		L	W		L
East Division
James Madison* x	6	–	2	8	–	3
Coastal Carolina xy	6	–	2	9	–	4
Marshall	5	–	3	9	–	4
Georgia Southern	3	–	5	6	–	7
Appalachian State	3	–	5	6	–	6
Georgia State	3	–	5	4	–	8
Old Dominion	2	–	6	3	–	9
West Division
No. 19 Troy xy$	7	–	1	12	–	2
South Alabama x	7	–	1	10	–	3
Southern Miss	4	–	4	7	–	6
Louisiana	4	–	4	6	–	7
Louisiana–Monroe	3	–	5	4	–	8
Texas State	2	–	6	4	–	8
Arkansas State	1	–	7	3	–	9
Championship: Troy 45, Coastal Carolina 26
$ – Conference champion; x – Division champion/co-champions; y – Championship game participant; * – Ineligible for postseason play due to FCS-to-FBS transition rules; Rankings from AP Poll

2022 NCAA Division I FBS independents football records
	Conf.			Overall
Team	W		L	W		L
No. 18 Notre Dame		–		9	–	4
Liberty		–		8	–	5
BYU		–		8	–	5
New Mexico State		–		7	–	6
Army		–		6	–	6
UConn		–		6	–	7
UMass		–		1	–	11
Rankings from AP Poll

== Rankings ==
The top 25 from the AP and USA Today Coaches Polls.

=== Pre-season polls ===
AP
Ranking	Team
1	Alabama (54)
2	Ohio State (6)
3	Georgia (3)
4	Clemson
5	Notre Dame
6	Texas A&M
7	Utah
8	Michigan
9	Oklahoma
10	Baylor
11	Oregon
12	Oklahoma State
13	NC State
14	USC
15	Michigan State
16	Miami (FL)
17	Pittsburgh
18	Wisconsin
19	Arkansas
20	Kentucky
21	Ole Miss
22	Wake Forest
23	Cincinnati
24	Houston
25	BYU

USA Today Coaches
Ranking	Team
1	Alabama (54)
2	Ohio State (5)
3	Georgia (6)
4	Clemson
5	Notre Dame
6	Michigan
7	Texas A&M
8	Utah
9	Oklahoma
10	Baylor
11	Oklahoma State
12	Oregon
13	NC State
14	Michigan State
15	USC
16	Pittsburgh
17	Miami (FL)
18	Texas (1)
19	Wake Forest
20	Wisconsin
21	Kentucky
22	Cincinnati
23	Arkansas
24	Ole Miss
25	Houston

=== CFB Playoff final rankings ===
On December 4, 2022, the College Football Playoff selection committee announced its final team rankings for the year.

Rank	Team	W–L	Conference and standing	Bowl game
1	Georgia Bulldogs	13–0	SEC champions	Peach Bowl (CFP semifinal)
2	Michigan Wolverines	13–0	Big Ten champions	Fiesta Bowl (CFP semifinal)
3	TCU Horned Frogs	12–1	Big 12 first place	Fiesta Bowl (CFP semifinal)
4	Ohio State Buckeyes	11–1	Big Ten East Division second place	Peach Bowl (CFP semifinal)
5	Alabama Crimson Tide	10–2	SEC West Division co-champions	Sugar Bowl (NY6)
6	Tennessee Volunteers	10–2	SEC East Division second place	Orange Bowl (NY6)
7	Clemson Tigers	11–2	ACC champions	Orange Bowl (NY6)
8	Utah Utes	10–3	Pac-12 champions	Rose Bowl (NY6)
9	Kansas State Wildcats	10–3	Big 12 champions	Sugar Bowl (NY6)
10	USC Trojans	11–2	Pac-12 first place	Cotton Bowl (NY6)
11	Penn State Nittany Lions	10–2	Big Ten East Division third place	Rose Bowl (NY6)
12	Washington Huskies	10–2	Pac-12 second place (tie)	Alamo Bowl
13	Florida State Seminoles	9–3	ACC Atlantic Division second place	Cheez-It Bowl
14	Oregon State Beavers	9–3	Pac-12 fifth place (tie)	Las Vegas Bowl
15	Oregon Ducks	9–3	Pac-12 second place (tie)	Holiday Bowl
16	Tulane Green Wave	11–2	AAC champions	Cotton Bowl (NY6)
17	LSU Tigers	9–4	SEC West Division co-champions	Citrus Bowl
18	UCLA Bruins	9–3	Pac-12 fifth place (tie)	Sun Bowl
19	South Carolina Gamecocks	8–4	SEC East Division third place	Gator Bowl
20	Texas Longhorns	8–4	Big 12 third place	Alamo Bowl
21	Notre Dame Fighting Irish	8–4	Independent	Gator Bowl
22	Mississippi State Bulldogs	8–4	SEC West Division third place (tie)	ReliaQuest Bowl
23	NC State Wolfpack	8–4	ACC Atlantic Division third place (tie)	Duke's Mayo Bowl
24	Troy Trojans	11–2	Sun Belt champions	Cure Bowl
25	UTSA Roadrunners	11–2	C-USA champions	Cure Bowl

=== Final rankings ===
Rank	Associated Press	Coaches' Poll
1	Georgia (63)	Georgia
2	TCU	TCU
3	Michigan	Michigan
4	Ohio State	Ohio State
5	Alabama	Alabama
6	Tennessee	Tennessee
7	Penn State	Penn State
8	Washington	Washington
9	Tulane	Tulane
10	Utah	Florida State
11	Florida State	Utah
12	USC	Clemson
13	Clemson	USC
14	Kansas State	Kansas State
15	Oregon	LSU
16	LSU	Oregon
17	Oregon State	Oregon State
18	Notre Dame	Notre Dame
19	Troy	Mississippi State
20	Mississippi State	Troy
21	UCLA	UCLA
22	Pittsburgh	Pittsburgh
23	South Carolina	South Carolina
24	Fresno State	Fresno State
25	Texas	Texas

== Conference summaries ==
Rankings in this section are based CFP rankings released prior to the games.

Conference	Championship game				Overall Player of the Year/MVP	Offensive Player of the Year	Defensive Player of the Year	Special Teams Player of the Year	Coach of the Year
Conference	Date	Venue (Location)	Matchup	Result	Overall Player of the Year/MVP	Offensive Player of the Year	Defensive Player of the Year	Special Teams Player of the Year	Coach of the Year
ACC	Dec. 3, 2022	Bank of America Stadium (Charlotte, NC)	No. 9 Clemson (Atlantic) vs. No. 23 North Carolina (Coastal)	Clemson 39–10	Drake Maye, QB, North Carolina	Drake Maye, QB, North Carolina	Calijah Kancey, DT, Pittsburgh	—N/a	Mike Elko, Duke
American	Dec. 3, 2022	Yulman Stadium (New Orleans, LA)	No. 22 UCF (No. 2) at No. 18 Tulane (No. 1)	Tulane 45–28	—N/a	Tyjae Spears, RB, Tulane	Ivan Pace Jr., LB, Cincinnati	Mason Fletcher, P, Cincinnati	Willie Fritz, Tulane
Big Ten	Dec. 3, 2022	Lucas Oil Stadium (Indianapolis, IN)	No. 2 Michigan (East) vs. Purdue (West)	Michigan 43–22	—N/a	C. J. Stroud, QB, Ohio State	Jack Campbell, LB, Iowa	Jake Moody, PK, Michigan; Bryce Baringer, P, Michigan State; & Jaylin Lucas, RS, Indiana (Note: The Big Ten presents separate awards for its top placekicker, punter, and return specialist.)	Jim Harbaugh, Michigan (coaches & media)
Big 12	Dec. 3, 2022	AT&T Stadium (Arlington, TX)	No. 3 TCU (No. 1) vs. No. 10 Kansas State (No. 2)	Kan St 31–28 OT	—N/a	Max Duggan, QB, TCU	Felix Anudike-Uzomah, DE, Kansas State	Derius Davis, RS, TCU	Sonny Dykes, TCU
C–USA	Dec. 2, 2022	Alamodome (San Antonio, TX)	North Texas (No. 2) at UTSA (No. 1)	UTSA 48–27	Frank Harris, QB, UTSA	DeWayne McBride, RB, UAB	KD Davis, LB, North Texas	Gavin Baechle, PK, UTEP	Jeff Traylor, UTSA
MAC	Dec. 3, 2022	Ford Field (Detroit, MI)	Ohio (East) vs. Toledo (West)	Toledo 17–7	Kurtis Rourke, QB, Ohio	Kurtis Rourke, QB, Ohio	Jose Ramirez, DE, Eastern Michigan	Alex McNulty, PK, Buffalo	Tim Albin, Ohio
MW	Dec. 3, 2022	Albertsons Stadium (Boise, ID)	Fresno State (West) at Boise State (Mountain)	Fres St 28–16	—N/a	Brad Roberts, RB, Air Force	Viliami Fehoko, DE, San Jose State	Jack Browning, PK/P, San Diego State	Andy Avalos, Boise State
Pac-12	Dec. 2, 2022	Allegiant Stadium (Paradise, NV)	No. 4 USC (No. 1) vs. No. 11 Utah (No. 2)	Utah 47–24	—N/a	Caleb Williams, QB, USC	Tuli Tuipulotu, DL, USC	—N/a	Kalen DeBoer, Washington; Jonathan Smith, Oregon State
SEC	Dec. 3, 2022	Mercedes-Benz Stadium (Atlanta, GA)	No. 1 Georgia (East) vs. No. 14 LSU (West)	Georgia 50–30	—N/a	Hendon Hooker, QB, Tennessee	Will Anderson Jr., LB, Alabama	Jack Podlesny, Georgia	Kirby Smart, Georgia
Sun Belt	Dec. 3, 2022	Veterans Memorial Stadium (Troy, AL)	Coastal Carolina (East) at Troy (West)	Troy 45–26	Grayson McCall, QB, Coastal Carolina	Todd Centeio, QB, James Madison	Carlton Martial, LB, Troy	—N/a	Jon Sumrall, Troy

=== Conference champions' bowl games ===
Ranks are per the final CFP rankings, released on December 4, 2022, with win–loss records at that time.

Conference	Champion	W–L	Rank	Bowl game
ACC	Clemson	11–2	7	Orange Bowl (NY6)
American	Tulane	11–2	16	Cotton Bowl (NY6)
Big 12	Kansas State	10–3	9	Sugar Bowl (NY6)
Big Ten	Michigan ^{CFP}	13–0	2	Fiesta Bowl (semifinal)
C-USA	UTSA	11–2	25	Cure Bowl
MAC	Toledo	8–5	–	Boca Raton Bowl
Mountain West	Fresno State	9–4	–	LA Bowl
Pac-12	Utah	10–3	8	Rose Bowl (NY6)
SEC	Georgia ^{CFP}	13–0	1	Peach Bowl (semifinal)
Sun Belt	Troy	11–2	24	Cure Bowl

^{CFP} College Football Playoff participant

== Postseason ==
There are 41 team-competitive FBS post-season bowl games, with two teams advancing to a 42nd – the CFP National Championship game. Normally, a team is required to have a .500 minimum winning percentage during the regular season to become bowl-eligible (six wins for an 11- or 12-game schedule, and seven wins for a 13-game schedule). If there are not enough winning teams to fulfill all open bowl slots, teams with losing records may be chosen to fill all 82 bowl slots. Additionally, on the rare occasion in which a conference champion does not meet eligibility requirements, they are usually still chosen for bowl games via tie-ins for their conference.

Bowl game changes:

- The Bahamas Bowl is now sponsored by HomeTown Lenders.
- The game formerly known as the Outback Bowl was renamed as the ReliaQuest Bowl, following the end of sponsorship by Outback Steakhouse.
- The Cure Bowl is now sponsored by Duluth Trading Company.
- The Fiesta Bowl is now sponsored by Vrbo.
- The Pinstripe Bowl is now sponsored by Bad Boy Mowers.
- The Citrus Bowl is now sponsored by Kellogg's through its Cheez-It brand.
- The Frisco Football Classic will not be taking place this year, as it was a temporary replacement to accommodate all 84 bowl-eligible teams.

=== Bowl-eligible teams ===
- ACC (9): Clemson, Duke, Florida State, Louisville, NC State, North Carolina, Pittsburgh, Syracuse, Wake Forest
- American (7): Cincinnati, East Carolina, Houston, Memphis, SMU, Tulane, UCF
- Big Ten (9): Illinois, Iowa, Maryland, Michigan, Minnesota, Ohio State, Penn State, Purdue, Wisconsin
- Big 12 (8): Baylor, Kansas, Kansas State, Oklahoma, Oklahoma State, TCU, Texas, Texas Tech
- C-USA (6): Middle Tennessee, North Texas, Rice, (Note: Despite having a 5–7 record, Rice is bowl-eligible due to having the highest Academic Progress Rate among five-win teams.) UAB, UTSA, Western Kentucky
- MAC (6): Bowling Green, Buffalo, Eastern Michigan, Miami (OH), Ohio, Toledo
- Mountain West (7): Air Force, Boise State, Fresno State, San Diego State, San Jose State, Utah State, Wyoming
- Pac-12 (7): Oregon, Oregon State, UCLA, USC, Utah, Washington, Washington State
- SEC (11): Alabama, Arkansas, Florida, Georgia, Kentucky, LSU, Mississippi State, Missouri, Ole Miss, South Carolina, Tennessee
- Sun Belt (7): Coastal Carolina, Georgia Southern, Louisiana, Marshall, South Alabama, Southern Miss, Troy
- Independent (5): BYU, Liberty, Notre Dame, UConn, New Mexico State (Note: Despite having a 6–6 record with 2 wins over FCS teams, the NCAA granted a waiver for New Mexico State to be bowl-eligible due to their canceled game against San Jose State.)

Number of bowl berths available: 82
Number of bowl-eligible teams: 80
Number of conditional bowl-eligible teams: 1 (New Mexico State)
Number of teams qualified by APR: 1 (Rice)

=== Bowl-ineligible teams ===
- ACC (5): Boston College, Georgia Tech, Miami (FL), Virginia, Virginia Tech
- American (4): Navy, South Florida, Temple, Tulsa
- Big Ten (5): Indiana, Michigan State, Nebraska, Northwestern, Rutgers
- Big 12 (2): Iowa State, West Virginia
- C-USA (5): Charlotte, FIU, Florida Atlantic, Louisiana Tech, UTEP
- MAC (6): Akron, Ball State, Central Michigan, Kent State, Northern Illinois, Western Michigan
- Mountain West (5): Colorado State, Hawaii, Nevada, New Mexico, UNLV
- Pac-12 (5): Arizona, Arizona State, California, Colorado, Stanford
- SEC (3): Auburn, Texas A&M, Vanderbilt
- Sun Belt (7): Appalachian State, (Note: Despite having a 6–6 record, Appalachian State was bowl-ineligible as two of their wins were over FCS teams.) Arkansas State, Georgia State, James Madison, (Note: James Madison was bowl-ineligible due to their transition from FCS to FBS.) Louisiana–Monroe, Old Dominion, Texas State
- Independent (2): Army, (Note: Despite having a 6–6 record, Army was bowl-ineligible as two of their wins were over FCS teams.) UMass

Number of bowl-ineligible teams: 49

=== College Football Playoff ===
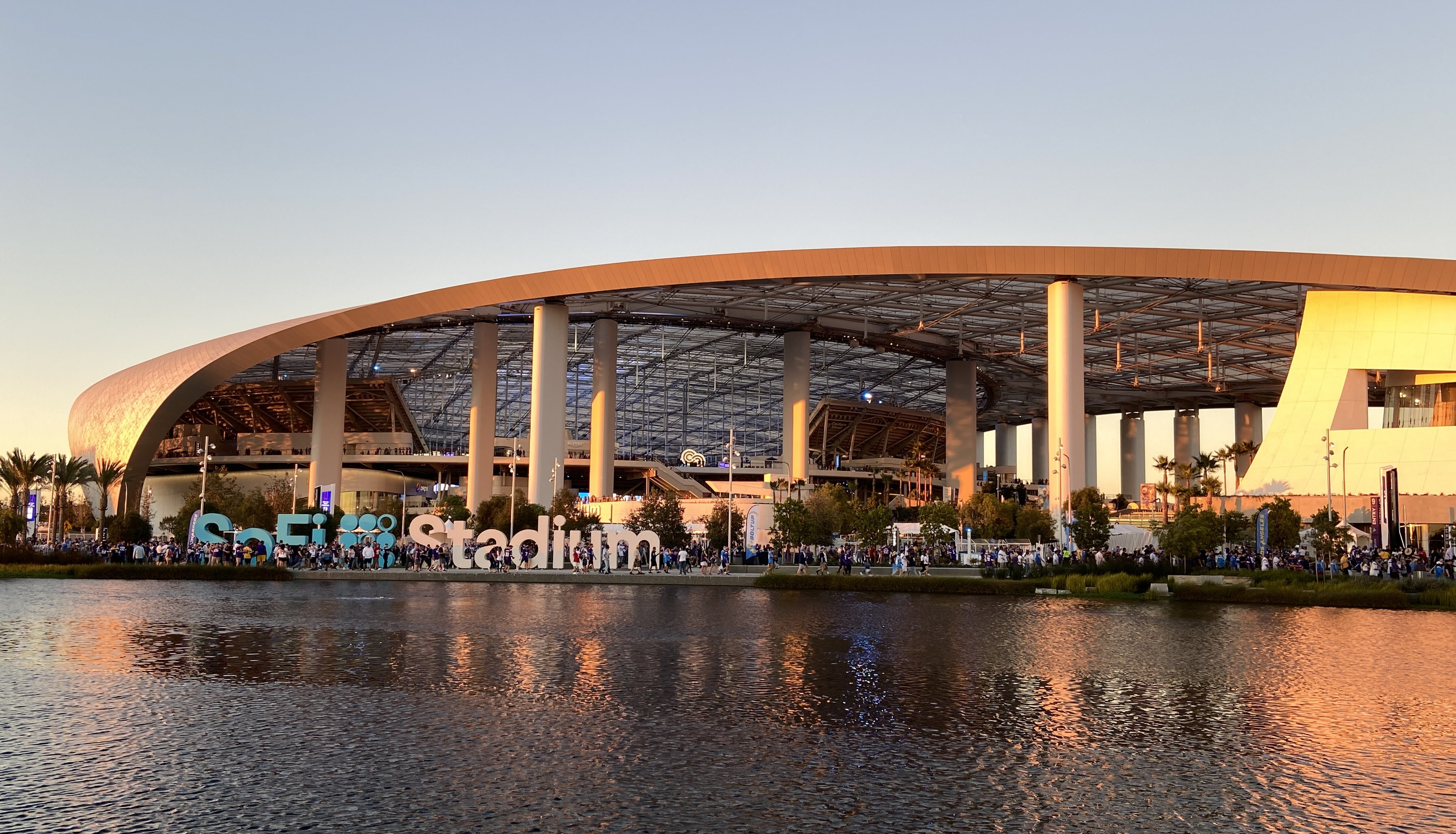
SoFi Stadium, site of the National Championship game

Semifinals
December 31 – Peach Bowl Mercedes-Benz Stadium, Atlanta
1	Georgia	42
4	Ohio State	41
December 31 – Fiesta Bowl State Farm Stadium, Glendale
2	Michigan	45
3	TCU	51

Championship
January 10 – National Championship SoFi Stadium, Inglewood
1	Georgia	65
3	TCU	7

=== Conference performance in bowl games ===
Conference	Total games	Wins-Losses (Pct)
SEC	12	7-5 (.583)
ACC	9	5–4 (.556)
Big Ten	9	5–4 (.556)
MAC	6	4–2 (.667)
American	7	4–3 (.571)
Independents	5	3-2 (.600)
C-USA	6	3–3 (.500)
Mountain West	7	3–4 (.429)
Pac-12	7	3–4 (.429)
Sun Belt	7	3-4 (.429)
Big 12	9	2–6 (.250)

=== All-star games ===
Each of these games features college seniors, or players whose college football eligibility is ending, who are individually invited by game organizers. These games are scheduled to follow the team-competitive bowls, to allow players selected from bowl teams to participate. The all-star games may include some players from non-FBS programs.

Date	Game	Site	Television	Participants	Results	Ref.
Jan. 14	Hula Bowl	FBC Mortgage Stadium; Orlando, Florida; 12:00 p.m.	CBS Sports Network	Team Kai; Team Aina	Kai 16; Aina 13	
Jan. 21	Tropical Bowl	Camping World Stadium; Orlando, Florida; 4:00 p.m.	Varsity Sports Network	American Team; National Team	American 48; National 10	
Jan. 28	NFLPA Collegiate Bowl	Rose Bowl; Pasadena, California; 6:00 p.m.	NFL Network	American Team; National Team	American 19; National 17	
Feb. 2	East–West Shrine Bowl	Allegiant Stadium; Paradise, Nevada; 8:30 p.m.	NFL Network	West Team; East Team	West 12; East 3	
Feb. 4	Senior Bowl	Hancock Whitney Stadium; Mobile, Alabama; 2:30 p.m.	NFL Network	National Team; American Team	National 27; American 10	
Feb. 25	HBCU Legacy Bowl	Yulman Stadium; New Orleans, Louisiana; 4:00 p.m.	NFL Network	Team Robinson; Team Gaither	Robinson 10; Gaither 3	

== Awards and honors ==
=== Heisman Trophy voting ===
The Heisman Trophy is given to the year's most outstanding player

Player	School	Position	1st	2nd	3rd	Total
Caleb Williams	USC	QB	544	168	63	2,031
Max Duggan	TCU	QB	188	357	142	1,420
C. J. Stroud	Ohio State	QB	37	119	190	539
Stetson Bennett	Georgia	QB	36	65	111	349
Hendon Hooker	Tennessee	QB	17	47	81	226
Bryce Young	Alabama	QB	17	28	34	141
Blake Corum	Michigan	RB	8	25	51	125
Michael Penix Jr.	Washington	QB	9	20	47	114
Bijan Robinson	Texas	RB	4	12	39	75
Drake Maye	North Carolina	QB	3	6	21	42

=== Other overall ===
- AP Player of the Year: Caleb Williams, QB, USC
- Lombardi Award (top player): Will Anderson Jr., LB, Alabama
- Maxwell Award (top player): Caleb Williams, QB, USC
- SN Player of the Year: Caleb Williams, QB, USC
- Walter Camp Award (top player): Caleb Williams, QB, USC

=== Special overall ===
- Burlsworth Trophy (top player who began as walk-on): Stetson Bennett, QB, Georgia
- Paul Hornung Award (most versatile player): Jack Colletto, LB, Oregon State
- Jon Cornish Trophy (top Canadian player): Chase Brown, RB, Illinois
- Campbell Trophy ("academic Heisman"): Jack Campbell, LB, Iowa
- Academic All-American of the Year: Will Levis, QB, Kentucky
- Wuerffel Trophy (humanitarian-athlete): Dillan Gibbons, OL, Florida State

The Senior CLASS Award, honoring the outstanding senior student-athlete in several NCAA Division I sports, including football, has gone on hiatus. On September 13, 2022, the award operator, Premier Sports Management, announced that it would not present the award until it picks up a new corporate sponsor.

=== Offense ===
Quarterback

- Davey O'Brien Award: Max Duggan, TCU
- Johnny Unitas Golden Arm Award (senior/4th year quarterback): Max Duggan, TCU
- Manning Award: Stetson Bennett, Georgia

Running back

- Doak Walker Award: Bijan Robinson, RB, Texas

All receivers

- Fred Biletnikoff Award: Jalin Hyatt, WR, Tennessee

Tight end

- John Mackey Award: Brock Bowers, TE, Georgia

Lineman:

- Rimington Trophy (center): Olusegun Oluwatimi, C, Michigan
- Outland Trophy (interior lineman on either offense or defense): Olusegun Oluwatimi, C, Michigan
- Joe Moore Award (offensive line): Michigan

=== Defense ===
- Bronko Nagurski Trophy (defensive player): Will Anderson Jr., LB, Alabama
- Chuck Bednarik Award (defensive player): Will Anderson Jr., LB, Alabama
- Lott Trophy (defensive impact): Will Anderson Jr., LB, Alabama

Defensive front

- Dick Butkus Award (linebacker): Jack Campbell, LB, Iowa
- Ted Hendricks Award (defensive end): Caleb Murphy, Ferris State

Defensive back

- Jim Thorpe Award: Tre Tomlinson, CB, TCU

=== Special teams ===
- Lou Groza Award (placekicker): Christopher Dunn, NC State
- Ray Guy Award (punter): Adam Korsak, Rutgers
- Jet Award (return specialist): Derius Davis, TCU
- Patrick Mannelly Award (long snapper): Chris Stoll, Penn State
- Peter Mortell Holder of the Year Award: Noah White, Louisiana Tech

=== Coaches ===
- AFCA Coach of the Year: Sonny Dykes, TCU
- AP Coach of the Year: Sonny Dykes, TCU
- Bobby Dodd Coach of the Year: Willie Fritz, Tulane
- Eddie Robinson Coach of the Year: Sonny Dykes, TCU
- George Munger Award: Willie Fritz, Tulane
- Home Depot Coach of the Year: Sonny Dykes, TCU
- Paul "Bear" Bryant Award: Sonny Dykes, TCU
- Walter Camp Coach of the Year: Sonny Dykes, TCU

==== Assistants ====
- AFCA Assistant Coach of the Year: Mike Tressel, DC/LB, Cincinnati
- Broyles Award: Garrett Riley, OC/QB, TCU

== Coaching changes ==
=== Preseason and in-season ===
This is restricted to coaching changes taking place on or after May 1, 2022, and will include any changes announced after a team's last regularly scheduled game but before its bowl game. For coaching changes that occurred earlier in 2022, see 2021 NCAA Division I FBS end-of-season coaching changes.

School	Outgoing coach	Date	Reason	Replacement
UAB	Bill Clark	June 24, 2022	Retired (effective August 1)	Bryant Vincent (interim, bowl)
Nebraska	Scott Frost	September 11, 2022	Fired	Mickey Joseph (interim)
Arizona State	Herm Edwards	September 18, 2022	Fired	Shaun Aguano (interim)
Georgia Tech	Geoff Collins	September 25, 2022	Fired	Brent Key (named on November 30)
Colorado	Karl Dorrell	October 2, 2022	Fired	Mike Sanford Jr. (interim)
Wisconsin	Paul Chryst	October 2, 2022	Fired	Jim Leonhard (interim, bowl)
Charlotte	Will Healy	October 23, 2022	Fired	Peter Rossomando (interim)
Auburn	Bryan Harsin	October 31, 2022	Fired	Cadillac Williams (interim)
South Florida	Jeff Scott	November 6, 2022	Fired	Daniel Da Prato (interim)
Cincinnati	Luke Fickell	November 27, 2022	Hired as head coach by Wisconsin	Kerry Coombs (interim, bowl)
Liberty	Hugh Freeze	November 28, 2022	Hired as head coach by Auburn	Josh Aldridge (interim, bowl)
Coastal Carolina	Jamey Chadwell	December 4, 2022	Hired as head coach by Liberty	Chad Staggs (interim, bowl)
North Texas	Seth Littrell	December 4, 2022	Fired	Phil Bennett (interim, bowl)
Louisville	Scott Satterfield	December 5, 2022	Hired as head coach by Cincinnati	Deion Branch (interim, bowl)
Purdue	Jeff Brohm	December 7, 2022	Hired as head coach by Louisville	Brian Brohm (interim, bowl)
Mississippi State	Mike Leach	December 12, 2022	Died	Zach Arnett (named on December 14)

=== End of season ===
This list includes coaching changes announced during the season that did not take effect until the end of the season.

School	Outgoing coach	Date	Reason	Replacement	Previous position
Charlotte	Peter Rossomando (interim)	November 15, 2022	Permanent replacement	Biff Poggi	Michigan associate head coach (2020–22)
Nebraska	Mickey Joseph (interim)	November 25, 2022	Permanent replacement	Matt Rhule	Carolina Panthers head coach (2020–22)
Arizona State	Shaun Aguano (interim)	November 26, 2022	Permanent replacement	Kenny Dillingham	Oregon offensive coordinator and quarterbacks coach (2022)
Florida Atlantic	Willie Taggart	November 26, 2022	Fired	Tom Herman	Texas head coach (2017–20)
Stanford	David Shaw	November 27, 2022	Resigned	Troy Taylor	Sacramento State head coach (2019–22)
Wisconsin	Jim Leonhard (interim)	November 27, 2022	Permanent replacement	Luke Fickell	Cincinnati head coach (2017–22)
Tulsa	Philip Montgomery	November 27, 2022	Fired	Kevin Wilson	Ohio State offensive coordinator (2017–22)
Texas State	Jake Spavital	November 27, 2022	Fired	G. J. Kinne	Incarnate Word head coach (2022)
Western Michigan	Tim Lester	November 28, 2022	Fired	Lance Taylor	Louisville offensive coordinator (2022)
UNLV	Marcus Arroyo	November 28, 2022	Fired	Barry Odom	Arkansas defensive coordinator (2020–2022)
Auburn	Cadillac Williams (interim)	November 28, 2022	Permanent replacement	Hugh Freeze	Liberty head coach (2019–22)
UAB	Bryant Vincent (interim)	November 30, 2022	Permanent replacement	Trent Dilfer	Lipscomb Academy head coach (2019–22)
Colorado	Mike Sanford Jr. (interim)	December 3, 2022	Permanent replacement	Deion Sanders	Jackson State head coach (2020–22)
South Florida	Daniel Da Prato (interim)	December 3, 2022	Permanent replacement	Alex Golesh	Tennessee offensive coordinator (2021–22)
Liberty	Josh Aldridge (interim, bowl)	December 4, 2022	Permanent replacement	Jamey Chadwell	Coastal Carolina head coach (2019–22)
Coastal Carolina	Chad Staggs (interim, bowl)	December 4, 2022	Permanent replacement	Tim Beck	NC State offensive coordinator (2020–22)
Cincinnati	Kerry Coombs (interim, bowl)	December 5, 2022	Permanent replacement	Scott Satterfield	Louisville head coach (2019–22)
Kent State	Sean Lewis	December 5, 2022	Hired as offensive coordinator by Colorado	Kenni Burns	Minnesota RB coach and associate head coach (2017–2022)
Louisville	Deion Branch (interim, bowl)	December 7, 2022	Permanent replacement	Jeff Brohm	Purdue head coach (2017–22)
Navy	Ken Niumatalolo	December 11, 2022	Fired	Brian Newberry	Navy defensive coordinator (2019–22)
Purdue	Brian Brohm (interim, bowl)	December 13, 2022	Permanent replacement	Ryan Walters	Illinois defensive coordinator (2021–22)
North Texas	Phil Bennett (interim, bowl)	December 13, 2022	Permanent replacement	Eric Morris	Washington State offensive coordinator (2022)

== Television changes ==
This is the final season of the Big Ten's television deal with ESPN, Fox and the Big Ten Network, and Conference USA's television deal with ESPN, Stadium, CBS Sports Network.

Prior to the season, ESPN signed a sublicence agreement with NFL Network. Select AAC, MAC and Sun Belt ESPN controlled conference games aired on the network as part of the agreement. The University of Oklahoma signed an agreement with ESPN+ prior to the season to launch SoonerVision. SoonerVision streams one regular season home game per year as well as the spring football game. Previously these aired on pay-per-view through Bally Sports Oklahoma.

Jason Benetti, formerly working for ESPN, and Noah Eagle, formerly working for CBS, joined Fox Sports as the #2 and #3 college football play-by-play commentators respectively. Benetti replaced Joe Davis, who became Fox's #1 MLB play-by-play commentator.

== Television viewers and ratings ==
=== Most watched regular season games ===
All times Eastern. Rankings are from the AP Poll (before 11/1) and CFP Rankings (thereafter).

Rank	Date	Time	Matchup				Network	Viewers (millions)	TV ratings	Significance
1	November 26	12:00 p.m.	No. 3 Michigan	45	No. 2 Ohio State	23	Fox	17.14	8.05	Big Noon Kickoff, College GameDay, rivalry
2	November 5	3:30 p.m.	No. 1 Tennessee	13	No. 3 Georgia	27	CBS	13.06	6.7	College GameDay, rivalry
3	October 15	3:30 p.m.	No. 3 Alabama	49	No. 6 Tennessee	52	CBS	11.56	6.1	College GameDay, Third Saturday in October
4	September 10	12:00 p.m.	No. 1 Alabama	20	Texas	19	Fox	10.60	5.7	Big Noon Kickoff, College GameDay
5	September 3	7:30 p.m.	No. 5 Notre Dame	10	No. 2 Ohio State	21	ABC	10.53	5.2	College GameDay
6	November 12	3:30 p.m.	No. 9 Alabama	30	No. 11 Ole Miss	24	CBS	8.71	4.8	Rivalry
7	October 29	12:00 p.m.	No. 2 Ohio State	44	No. 13 Penn State	31	Fox	8.27	4.5	Big Noon Kickoff, rivalry
8	November 5	7:00 p.m.	No. 6 Alabama	31	No. 10 LSU	32	ESPN	7.58	3.9	Rivalry
9	September 4	7:30 p.m.	Florida State	24	LSU	23	ABC	7.55	3.9	Louisiana Kickoff
10	October 8	8:00 p.m.	Texas A&M	20	No. 1 Alabama	24	CBS	7.15	3.9	

=== Conference championship games ===
All times Eastern. Rankings are from the College Football Playoff Rankings.

Rank	Date	Time	Matchup				Network	Viewers (millions)	TV ratings	Conference	Location
1	December 3	4:00 p.m.	No. 14 LSU	30	No. 1 Georgia	50	CBS	10.89	5.6	SEC	Mercedes-Benz Stadium
2	December 3	8:00 p.m.	Purdue	22	No. 2 Michigan	43	Fox	10.70	5.5	Big Ten	Lucas Oil Stadium
3	December 3	12:00 p.m.	No. 10 Kansas State	31	No. 3 TCU	28	ABC	9.41	5.3	Big 12	AT&T Stadium
4	December 2	8:00 p.m.	No. 11 Utah	47	No. 4 USC	24	Fox	5.97	3.3	Pac-12	Allegiant Stadium
5	December 3	8:00 p.m.	No. 9 Clemson	39	No. 23 North Carolina	10	ABC	3.47	1.9	ACC	Bank of America Stadium
6	December 3	4:00 p.m.	No. 22 UCF	28	No. 18 Tulane	45	ABC	2.70	1.5	AAC	Yulman Stadium
7	December 3	4:00 p.m.	Fresno State	28	Boise State	16	Fox	1.94	1.0	MW	Albertsons Stadium
8	December 3	12:00 p.m.	Toledo	17	Ohio	7	ESPN	721K	0.4	MAC	Ford Field
9	December 3	3:30 p.m.	Coastal Carolina	26	Troy	45	ESPN	332K	0.2	Sun Belt	Veterans Memorial Stadium
n/a	December 2	7:30 p.m.	North Texas	27	UTSA	48	CBSSN (Note: CBSSN is not Nielsen rated so the viewership and TV rating is unknown)	n.a.	n.a.	C-USA	Alamodome

=== Most watched non-CFP bowl games ===
All times Eastern. Rankings are from the College Football Playoff Rankings.

Rank	Date	Time	Matchup				Network	Viewers (millions)	TV ratings	Game	Location
1	December 30, 2022	3:30 p.m.	No. 21 Notre Dame	45	No. 19 South Carolina	38	ESPN	5.8	3.1	Gator Bowl	TIAA Bank Field, Jacksonville, FL
2	December 29, 2022	5:30 p.m.	Oklahoma	32	No. 13 Florida State	35	ESPN	5.4	2.9	Cheez-It Bowl	Camping World Stadium, Orlando, FL
3	December 29, 2022	9:00 p.m.	No. 20 Texas	20	No. 12 Washington	27	ESPN	4.8	2.6	Alamo Bowl	Alamodome, San Antonio, TX
4	December 28, 2022	8:00 p.m.	No. 15 Oregon	28	North Carolina	27	Fox	4.0	2.1	Holiday Bowl	Petco Park, San Diego, CA
5	December 28, 2022	5:30 p.m.	Arkansas	55 (3OT)	Kansas	53	ESPN	3.9	2.1	Liberty Bowl	Simmons Bank Liberty Stadium, Memphis, TN
6	December 23, 2022	6:30 p.m.	Wake Forest	27	Missouri	17	ESPN	3.5	1.8	Gasparilla Bowl	Raymond James Stadium, Tampa, FL
7	January 2, 2023	1:00 p.m.	No. 17 LSU	63	Purdue	7	ABC	3.3	1.9	Citrus Bowl	Camping World Stadium, Orlando, FL
8	December 31, 2022	12:00 p.m.	Iowa	21	Kentucky	0	ABC	3.0	1.7	Music City Bowl	Nissan Stadium, Nashville, TN
9	December 29, 2022	2:00 p.m.	Syracuse	20	Minnesota	28	ESPN	2.75	1.5	Pinstripe Bowl	Yankee Stadium, Bronx, NY
10	December 30, 2022	12:00 p.m.	Maryland	16	No. 23 NC State	12	ESPN	2.7	1.6	Duke's Mayo Bowl	Bank of America Stadium, Charlotte, NC

=== New Year Six and College Football Playoff semifinal games ===
All times Eastern. Rankings are from the College Football Playoff Rankings.

Rank	Date	Time	Matchup				Network(s)	Viewers (millions)	TV ratings	Game	Location
1	December 31, 2022	8:00 p.m.	No. 4 Ohio State	41	No. 1 Georgia	42	ESPN; ESPN2; ESPNU; ESPNews; SECN	21.7	9.4	Peach Bowl (CFP Semifinal)	Mercedes-Benz Stadium, Atlanta, GA
2	December 31, 2022	4:00 p.m.	No. 3 TCU	51	No. 2 Michigan	45	ESPN; ESPN2; ESPNU; ESPNews	20.9	9.6	Fiesta Bowl (CFP Semifinal)	State Farm Stadium, Glendale, AZ
3	January 9, 2023	7:30 p.m.	No. 3 TCU	7	No. 1 Georgia	65	ESPN; ESPN2; ESPNU; ESPNews; SECN	16.6	4.65	CFP National Championship	SoFi Stadium, Inglewood, CA
4	January 2, 2023	5:00 pm	No. 11 Penn State	35	No. 8 Utah	21	ESPN	10.2	5.4	Rose Bowl (NY6)	Rose Bowl, Pasadena, CA
5	December 31, 2022	12:00 p.m.	No. 5 Alabama	45	No. 9 Kansas State	20	ESPN; SECN	9.1	4.8	Sugar Bowl (NY6)	Caesars Superdome, New Orleans, LA
6	December 30, 2022	8:00 p.m.	No. 6 Tennessee	31	No. 7 Clemson	14	ESPN; ESPNU; SECN; ACCN	8.6	4.6	Orange Bowl (NY6)	Hard Rock Stadium, Miami Gardens, FL
7	January 2, 2023	1:00 pm	No. 16 Tulane	46	No. 10 USC	45	ESPN	4.2	2.3	Cotton Bowl (NY6)	AT&T Stadium, Arlington, TX

== Attendances ==
#	College football team	Average attendance
1	Michigan Wolverines	110,246
2	Penn State Nittany Lions	107,379
3	Ohio State Buckeyes	104,663
4	LSU Tigers	100,596
5	Tennessee Volunteers	100,532
6	Texas Longhorns	100,242
7	Alabama Crimson Tide	98,981
8	Texas A&M Aggies	97,213
9	Georgia Bulldogs	92,746
10	Florida Gators	87,180
11	Nebraska Cornhuskers	86,637
12	Auburn Tigers	85,203
13	Oklahoma Sooners	83,835
14	Clemson Tigers	80,694
15	Notre Dame Fighting Irish	76,193
16	South Carolina Gamecocks	75,785
17	Wisconsin Badgers	74,159
18	Arkansas Razorbacks	73,155
19	Iowa Hawkeyes	69,250
20	Michigan State Spartans	69,047
21	Florida State Seminoles	67,254
22	USC Trojans	64,487
23	Virginia Tech Hokies	64,356
24	Washington Huskies	62,933
25	Ole Miss Rebels	62,575
26	Kentucky Wildcats	60,289
27	BYU Cougars	59,674
28	Iowa State Cyclones	57,344
29	Purdue Boilermakers	57,129
30	Texas Tech Red Raiders	56,870
31	NC State Wolfpack	55,924
32	Miami Hurricanes	54,964
33	Oregon Ducks	54,950
34	Oklahoma State Cowboys	54,735
35	Pittsburgh Panthers	54,710
36	Missouri Tigers	54,525
37	Mississippi State Bulldogs	53,822
38	Utah Utes	52,057
39	Kansas State Wildcats	51,165
40	Rutgers Scarlet Knights	50,756
41	North Carolina Tar Heels	47,933
42	West Virginia Mountaineers	47,658
43	Indiana Hoosiers	46,906
44	TCU Horned Frogs	46,562
45	Baylor Bears	45,463
46	Minnesota Golden Gophers	45,019
47	Arizona Wildcats	44,209
48	Arizona State Sun Devils	43,081
49	Kansas Jayhawks	43,076
50	Illinois Fighting Illini	43,048
51	Colorado Buffaloes	42,847
52	Louisville Cardinals	41,692
53	UCLA Bruins	41,593
54	UCF Knights	41,542
55	Syracuse Orange	40,828
56	Virginia Cavaliers	40,681
57	East Carolina Pirates	39,649
58	Fresno State Bulldogs	39,067
59	California Golden Bears	38,596
60	Cincinnati Bearcats	38,117
61	Navy Midshipmen	36,165
62	Boston College Eagles	35,706
63	Boise State Broncos	35,121
64	Georgia Tech Yellow Jackets	34,408
65	Appalachian State Mountaineers	33,566
66	Maryland Terrapins	31,934
67	Oregon State Beavers	31,498
68	Wake Forest Demon Deacons	30,053
69	Stanford Cardinal	29,965
70	San Diego State Aztecs	29,892
71	South Florida Bulls	29,650
72	Vanderbilt Commodores	29,193
73	Northwestern Wildcats	28,697
74	Army Black Knights	28,647
75	Air Force Falcons	26,926
76	Colorado State Rams	26,891
77	UTSA Roadrunners	26,835
78	Troy Trojans	26,346
79	Memphis Tigers	26,196
80	Washington State Cougars	26,185
81	Houston Cougars	25,394
82	Southern Miss Golden Eagles	25,131
83	SMU Mustangs	24,971
84	Duke Blue Devils	24,505
85	UAB Blazers	23,058
86	James Madison Dukes	22,966
87	UNLV Rebels	22,112
88	Connecticut Huskies	22,095
89	Marshall Thundering Herd	21,842
90	Liberty Flames	20,954
91	Florida Atlantic Owls	20,679
92	Tulane Green Wave	20,361
93	Old Dominion Monarchs	20,232
94	Wyoming Cowboys	19,707
95	Toledo Rockets	19,557
96	UTEP Miners	19,134
97	North Texas Mean Green	19,025
98	Rice Owls	19,011
99	Tulsa Golden Hurricane	18,745
100	Jacksonville State Gamecocks	18,161
101	Ohio Bobcats	17,692
102	Miami RedHawks	17,572
103	Texas State Bobcats	17,541
104	Georgia Southern Eagles	17,379
105	Temple Owls	17,277
106	Coastal Carolina Chanticleers	17,114
107	Utah State Aggies	16,954
108	South Alabama Jaguars	16,646
109	San Jose State Spartans	16,422
110	Georgia State Panthers	16,023
111	Central Michigan Chippewas	15,823
112	Buffalo Bulls	15,510
113	Western Kentucky Hilltoppers	15,440
114	Arkansas State Red Wolves	15,265
115	Western Michigan Broncos	15,260
116	Eastern Michigan Eagles	15,186
117	Louisiana Tech Bulldogs	15,082
118	New Mexico State Aggies	15,034
119	New Mexico Lobos	14,966
120	Nevada Wolf Pack	14,905
121	Louisiana Ragin' Cajuns	14,542
122	Middle Tennessee Blue Raiders	14,363
123	FIU Panthers	13,789
124	Louisiana-Monroe Warhawks	13,380
125	Kent State Golden Flashes	13,354
126	Bowling Green Falcons	11,663
127	Ball State Cardinals	11,637
128	Akron Zips	11,199
129	Charlotte 49ers	10,907
130	Massachusetts Minutemen	10,800
131	Hawai'i Rainbow Warriors	9,210
132	Northern Illinois Huskies	9,198
133	Sam Houston Bearkats	7,611

== See also ==
- 2022 NCAA Division I FCS football season
- 2022 NCAA Division II football season
- 2022 NCAA Division III football season
- 2022 NAIA football season
- 2022 U Sports football season
- 2022 junior college football season
