= List of Georgia Southern Eagles football seasons =

The Georgia Southern Eagles college football team competes as part of the National Collegiate Athletic Association (NCAA) Division I FBS, representing Georgia Southern University in the Sun Belt Conference. Georgia Southern has played their home games at Paulson Stadium in Statesboro, Georgia since 1984.

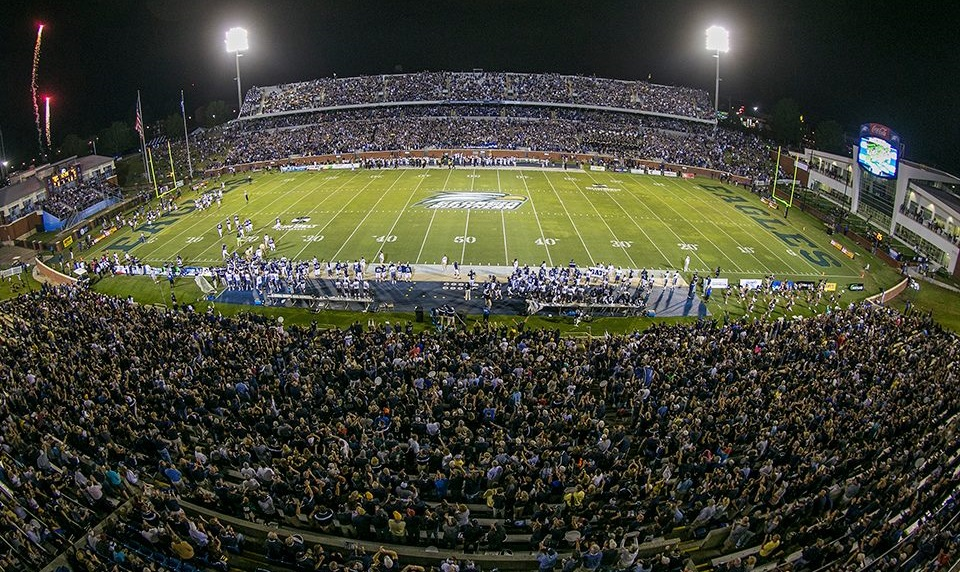
Georgia Southern hosts rival, Appalachian State, in Paulson Stadium before a crowd of 24.535

The inaugural season of Georgia Southern, then known as Georgia Normal School and subsequently South Georgia Teachers College and Georgia Teachers College, football was in 1924. However, the program was shut down in 1942 because of World War II and was not revived until 1981. The Eagles are 369-238-9 all time and have claimed a record six Div. I FCS national championships. The program has also produced two Walter Payton Award winners.

Georgia Southern was a member of the FCS conference SoCon between 1992 and 2013. In 2014 the program, after years of speculation, became an official member of college football's FBS level. The Eagles now compete as a member of the Sun Belt Conference.

== Seasons ==
National champions †	Conference champions *	FCS playoff berth ‡	Bowl game berth ^

Season	Head coach		Season results					Playoff or bowl result	Final ranking	
Season	Head coach		Conference finish	Division finish	Wins	Losses	Ties	Playoff or bowl result	NCAA/TSN Poll	Coaches Poll
Georgia Normal/South Georgia Teachers/Georgia Teachers Blue Tide
1924	E. G. Cromartie	Independent	—	—	1	3	0	—	—	—
1925	E. G. Cromartie	Independent	—	—	1	3	0	—	—	—
1926	E. G. Cromartie	Independent	—	—	5	3	1	—	—	—
1927	Hugh A. Woodle	Independent	—	—	6	1	1	—	—	—
1928	Hugh A. Woodle	Independent	—	—	5	5	0	—	—	—
1929	Crook Smith	Independent	—	—	3	3	2	—	—	—
1930	Crook Smith	Independent	—	—	3	4	1	—	—	—
1931	Crook Smith	Independent	—	—	3	6	0	—	—	—
1932	Crook Smith	Independent	—	—	7	2	0	—	—	—
1933	Crook Smith	Independent	—	—	5	4	0	—	—	—
1934	Crook Smith	Independent	—	—	4	6	0	—	—	—
1935	Crook Smith	Independent	—	—	3	3	2	—	—	—
1936	Crook Smith	Independent	—	—	2	9	0	—	—	—
1937	Crook Smith	Independent	—	—	2	9	0	—	—	—
1938	Crook Smith	Independent	—	—	3	5	1	—	—	—
1939	Crook Smith	Independent	—	—	5	5	0	—	—	—
1940	Crook Smith	Independent	—	—	3	5	0	—	—	—
1941	Crook Smith	Independent	—	—	2	8	0	—	—	—
Georgia Teachers College/Georgia Southern College did not field a football team for the 1942–81 seasons
Georgia Southern Eagles
1982	Erk Russell	Independent	—	—	7	3	1	—	—	—
1983	Erk Russell	Independent	—	—	6	5	0	—	—	—
1984	Erk Russell	Independent	—	—	8	3	0	—	—	—
1985 ^{†}*	Erk Russell	Independent	—	—	13	2	0	Won FCS National Championship Game against Furman Paladins, 44–42 ^	—	—
1986 ^{†}*	Erk Russell	Independent	—	—	13	2	0	Won FCS National Championship Game against Arkansas State Indians, 48–21 ^	—	—
1987	Erk Russell	Independent	—	—	9	4	0	Lost in FCS Quarterfinals against Appalachian State Mountaineers, 19–0 ^	—	—
1988	Erk Russell	Independent	—	—	12	3	0	Lost FCS National Championship Game against Furman Paladins, 17–12 ^	—	—
1989 ^{†}*	Erk Russell	Independent	—	—	15	0	0	Won FCS National Championship Game against Stephen F. Austin Lumberjacks, 37–34 ^	—	—
1990 ^{†}*	Tim Stowers	Independent	—	—	12	3	0	Won FCS National Championship Game against Nevada Wolfpack, 36–13	—	—
1991	Tim Stowers	Independent	—	—	7	4	0	—	—	—
1992	Tim Stowers	Southern Conference	—	—	7	4	0	—	—	—
1993	Tim Stowers	Southern Conference	1st *	—	10	3	0	Lost in FCS Quarterfinals against Youngstown State Penguins, 34–14	—	—
1994	Tim Stowers	Southern Conference	3rd	—	6	5	0	—	—	—
1995	Tim Stowers	Southern Conference	3rd	—	9	4	0	Lost in FCS Quarterfinals against Montana Grizzlies, 45–0	—	—
1996	Frank Ellwood	Southern Conference	6th	—	4	7	—	—	—	—
1997	Paul Johnson	Southern Conference	1st *	—	10	3	—	Lost in FCS Quarterfinals against Delaware Blue Hens, 16–7	—	—
1998	Paul Johnson	Southern Conference	1st *	—	14	1	—	Lost FCS National Championship Game against UMass Minutemen, 55–43	—	—
1999 ^{†}*	Paul Johnson	Southern Conference	1st *	—	13	2	—	Won FCS National Championship Game against Youngstown State Penguins, 59–24	—	—
2000 ^{†}*	Paul Johnson	Southern Conference	1st *	—	13	2	—	Won FCS National Championship Game against Montana Grizzlies, 27–25	—	—
2001	Paul Johnson	Southern Conference	1st *	—	12	2	—	Lost in FCS Semifinals against Furman Paladins, 24–17	—	—
2002	Mike Sewak	Southern Conference	1st *	—	11	3	—	Lost in FCS Semifinals against Western Kentucky Hilltoppers, 31–28	—	—
2003	Mike Sewak	Southern Conference	3rd	—	7	4	—	—	—	—
2004	Mike Sewak	Southern Conference	1st *	—	9	3	—	Lost in FCS 1st Round against New Hampshire Wildcats, 27–23	—	—
2005	Mike Sewak	Southern Conference	2nd	—	8	4	—	Lost in FCS 1st Round against Texas State Bobcats, 50–35	—	—
2006	Brian VanGorder	Southern Conference	5th	—	3	8	—	—	—	—
2007	Chris Hatcher	Southern Conference	3rd	—	7	4	—	—	—	—
2008	Chris Hatcher	Southern Conference	4th	—	6	5	—	—	—	—
2009	Chris Hatcher	Southern Conference	4th	—	5	6	—	—	—	—
2010	Jeff Monken	Southern Conference	3rd	—	10	5	—	Lost in FCS Semifinals against Delaware Blue Hens, 27–10	—	—
2011	Jeff Monken	Southern Conference	1st *	—	11	3	—	Lost in FCS Semifinals against North Dakota State Bison, 35–7 ^	—	—
2012	Jeff Monken	Southern Conference	1st *	—	10	4	—	Lost in FCS Semifinals against North Dakota State Bison, 23–20 ^	—	—
2013	Jeff Monken	Southern Conference	4th	—	7	4	—	Ineligible	—	—
2014	Willie Fritz	Sun Belt Conference	1st *	—	9	3	—	Ineligible	—	—
2015	Willie Fritz	Sun Belt Conference	3rd ^	—	9	4	—	Won GoDaddy Bowl against Bowling Green Falcons, 58–27	—	—
2016	Tyson Summers (fired Oct. 22, 2017) Chad Lunsford (Interim, 2–4)	Sun Belt Conference	6th	—	5	7	—	—	—	—
2017	Tyson Summers (fired Oct. 22, 2017) Chad Lunsford (Interim, 2–4)	Sun Belt Conference	10th	—	2	10	—	—	—	—
2018	Chad Lunsford (fired Sep. 26, 2021) Kevin Whitley (Interim, 2–6)	Sun Belt Conference	—	3rd, East	10	3	—	Won Camellia Bowl against Eastern Michigan Eagles, 23–21	—	—
2019	Chad Lunsford (fired Sep. 26, 2021) Kevin Whitley (Interim, 2–6)	Sun Belt Conference	—	2nd, East	7	6	—	Lost Cure Bowl against Liberty Flames, 16–23	—	—
2020	Chad Lunsford (fired Sep. 26, 2021) Kevin Whitley (Interim, 2–6)	Sun Belt Conference	—	4th, East	8	5	—	Won New Orleans Bowl against Louisiana Tech, 38-3	—	—
2021	Chad Lunsford (fired Sep. 26, 2021) Kevin Whitley (Interim, 2–6)	Sun Belt Conference	—	5th, East	3	9	—	—	—	—
2022	Clay Helton	Sun Belt Conference	—	4th, East	6	7	—	Lost Camellia Bowl against Buffalo, 21–23	—	—
2023	Clay Helton	Sun Belt Conference	—	T5th, East	6	7	—	Lost Myrtle Beach Bowl against Ohio, 21-41	—	—
2024	Clay Helton	Sun Belt Conference	—	2nd, East	8	5	—	Lost New Orleans Bowl against Sam Houston, 26-31	—	—
2025	Clay Helton	Sun Belt Conference	—	4th, East	7	6	—	Won Birmingham Bowl against Appalachian State, 29-10	—	—
Total					383	248	9	(regular season games)		
					0	0	0	(conference championship games; 0 appearances)		
					45	13	—	(playoff games; 58 appearances)		
					4	4	—	(bowl games; 7 appearances)		
					430	265	9	(all games)		
