= Salute to Veterans Bowl =

Annual American college football postseason game

- IS4S Salute to Veterans Bowl
- Stadium: Cramton Bowl (25,000)
- Location: Montgomery, Alabama
- Operated: 2014–present
- Conference tie-ins: MAC, Sun Belt, C-USA (alternate)
- Payout: US$300,000 (2019)
- Website: salutetoveteransbowl.com

Sponsors
- Raycom Media (2014–2018); TaxAct (2021); IS4S (2024–present)

Former names
- Raycom Media Camellia Bowl (2014–2018); Camellia Bowl (2019–2020, 2022–2023); TaxAct Camellia Bowl (2021)

2025 matchup
- Troy vs. Jacksonville State (Jacksonville State 17–13)

The Salute to Veterans Bowl (formerly the Camellia Bowl) (Note: For earlier games also known as the Camellia Bowl, see Camellia Bowl (disambiguation).) is an annual National Collegiate Athletic Association (NCAA) sanctioned FBS college football bowl game played in Montgomery, Alabama, at the Cramton Bowl. The bowl has tie-ins with the Sun Belt Conference and the Mid-American Conference (MAC). The game was announced in August 2013 and was first played in December 2014. It is owned and managed by ESPN Events.

== Sponsorship ==
The bowl was sponsored at its inception by Raycom Media, a major owner of television stations in the southeastern United States with heavy involvement in college sports broadcasting, and was officially known as the Raycom Media Camellia Bowl. In June 2018, Gray Television announced its intent to acquire Raycom. The acquisition was completed in January 2019, and the 2019 and 2020 editions of the bowl were played without a title sponsor.

On November 24, 2021, TaxAct was named as the new title sponsor of both the Camellia Bowl and the Texas Bowl.

On October 15, 2024, Integrated Solutions for Systems, Inc. (IS4S)—a Huntsville, Alabama-based government and military contractor—was announced as the new sponsor of the game, renaming it the IS4S Salute to Veterans Bowl.

== Game results ==
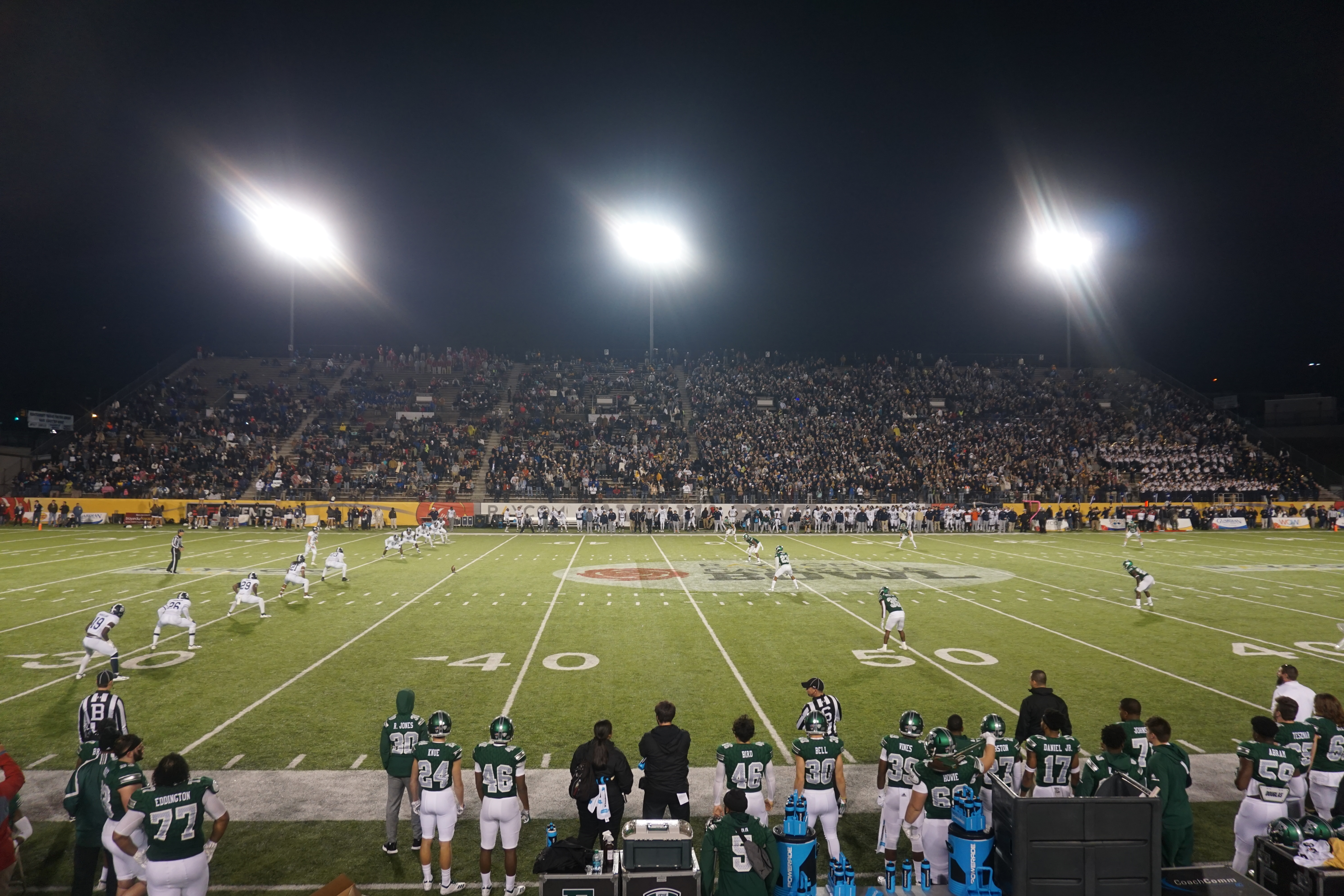
Kickoff of the 2018 edition

Date	Game name	Winning team		Losing team		Attendance
December 20, 2014	Camellia Bowl	Bowling Green	33	South Alabama	28	20,256
December 19, 2015	Camellia Bowl	Appalachian State	31	Ohio	29	21,395
December 17, 2016	Camellia Bowl	Appalachian State	31	Toledo	28	20,300
December 16, 2017	Camellia Bowl	Middle Tennessee	35	Arkansas State	30	20,612
December 15, 2018	Camellia Bowl	Georgia Southern	23	Eastern Michigan	21	17,710
December 21, 2019	Camellia Bowl	Arkansas State	34	FIU	26	16,209
December 25, 2020	Camellia Bowl	Buffalo	17	Marshall	10	2,512
December 25, 2021	Camellia Bowl	Georgia State	51	Ball State	20	7,345
December 27, 2022	Camellia Bowl	Buffalo	23	Georgia Southern	21	15,322
December 23, 2023	Camellia Bowl	Northern Illinois	21	Arkansas State	19	11,310
December 14, 2024	Salute to Veterans Bowl	South Alabama	30	Western Michigan	23	12,021
December 16, 2025	Salute to Veterans Bowl	Jacksonville State	17	Troy	13	15,721

== MVPs ==
The bowl's MVP receives the Bart Starr Most Valuable Player Award; Starr was born and raised in Montgomery, where the game is played.

Year	MVP	Team	Position
2014	James Knapke	Bowling Green	QB
2015	Marcus Cox	Appalachian State	RB
2016	Taylor Lamb	Appalachian State	QB
2017	Darius Harris	Middle Tennessee	OLB
2018	Shai Werts	Georgia Southern	QB
2019	Omar Bayless	Arkansas State	WR
2020	Kevin Marks	Buffalo	RB
2021	Darren Grainger	Georgia State	QB
2022	Justin Marshall	Buffalo	WR
2023	Rocky Lombardi	Northern Illinois	QB
2024	Jeremiah Webb	South Alabama	WR
2025	Caden Creel	Jacksonville State	QB

== Most appearances ==
Updated through the December 2025 edition (12 games, 24 total appearances).

Teams with multiple appearances

Rank	Team	Appearances	Record
1	Arkansas State	3	1–2
2	Appalachian State	2	2–0
2	Buffalo	2	2–0
2	Georgia Southern	2	1–1
2	South Alabama	2	1–1

Teams with a single appearance

Won (5): Bowling Green, Georgia State, Jacksonville State, Middle Tennessee, Northern Illinois
Lost (8): Ball State, Eastern Michigan, FIU, Marshall, Ohio, Toledo, Troy, Western Michigan

== Appearances by conference ==
Updated through the December 2025 edition (12 games, 24 total appearances).

Conference	Record				Appearances by season	
Conference	Games	W	L	Win pct.	Won	Lost
Sun Belt	11	6	5	.545	2015, 2016, 2018, 2019, 2021, 2024	2014, 2017, 2022, 2023, 2025
MAC	9	4	5	.444	2014, 2020, 2022, 2023	2015, 2016, 2018, 2021, 2024
CUSA	4	2	2	.500	2017, 2025	2019, 2020

== Game records ==
Team	Record, Team vs. Opponent	Year
Most points scored (one team)	51, Georgia State vs. Ball State	2021
Most points scored (losing team)	30, Arkansas State vs. Middle Tennessee	2017
Most points scored (both teams)	71, Georgia State vs. Ball State	2021
Fewest points allowed	10, Marshall vs. Buffalo	2020
Largest margin of victory	31, Georgia State vs. Ball State	2021
Total yards	537, South Alabama vs. Western Michigan	2024
Rushing yards	331, Georgia Southern vs. Eastern Michigan	2018
Passing yards	393, Arkansas State vs. FIU	2019
First downs	31, Arkansas State vs. FIU	2019
Fewest yards allowed	217, Troy vs. Jacksonville State	2025
Fewest rushing yards allowed	74, Ball State vs. Georgia State	2021
Fewest passing yards allowed	33, Eastern Michigan vs. Georgia Southern	2018
Individual	Record, Player, Team	Year
All-purpose yards	182, Jeremiah Webb (South Alabama)	2024
Touchdowns (all-purpose)	2, multiple players—most recently: Jeremiah Webb (South Alabama)	2024
Rushing yards	162, Marcus Cox (Appalachian State)	2015
Rushing touchdowns	2, multiple players—most recently: Shai Werts (Georgia Southern)	2018
Passing yards	393, Layne Hatcher (Arkansas State)	2019
Passing touchdowns	4, Layne Hatcher (Arkansas State)	2019
Receiving yards	182, Jeremiah Webb (South Alabama)	2024
Receiving touchdowns	2, multiple players—most recently: Jeremiah Webb (South Alabama)	2024
Tackles	18, Maleki Harris (South Alabama)	2014
Sacks	2, shared by: Bryan Thomas (Bowling Green); Eric Black (Buffalo); Jamil Muhammad (Georgia State)	2014; 2020; 2021
Interceptions	2, BJ Edmonds (Arkansas State)	2017
Long Plays	Record, Player, Team	Year
Touchdown run	50 yds., Bishop Davenport (South Alabama)	2024
Touchdown pass	79 yds., Joshua Thompson from Kyle Vantrease (Georgia Southern)	2022
Kickoff return	94 yds., Darrynton Evans (Appalachian State)	2016
Punt return	25 yds., Corey Jones (Toledo)	2016
Interception return	55 yds., Antavious Lane (Georgia State)	2021
Fumble return	54 yds., D. J. Sanders (Middle Tennessee)	2017
Punt	61 yds., shared by: Cody Grace (Arkansas State); Robert LeFevre (Marshall); Anthony Venneri (Buffalo)	2017; 2020; 2022
Field goal	52 yds., José Borregales (FIU)	2019

† For all-purpose yardage, the bowl's record book lists Murray's 179 yards (76 receiving, 103 kickoff return) despite Webb having 182 yards (all receiving).

== Media coverage ==
The bowl has been televised by ESPN since its inception.
