= 2022 Camellia Bowl =

Postseason college football bowl game

- 9th Camellia Bowl
Georgia Southern Eagles	Buffalo Bulls
(6–6)	(6–6)
Sun Belt	MAC
21	23
Head coach: Clay Helton	Head coach: Maurice Linguist
	1	2	3	4	Total
Georgia Southern	0	6	8	7	21
Buffalo	0	14	6	3	23
- Date: December 27, 2022
- Season: 2022
- Stadium: Cramton Bowl
- Location: Montgomery, Alabama
- MVP: Justin Marshall (WR, Buffalo)
- Favorite: Georgia Southern by 6
- Referee: Luke Richmond (American)
- Attendance: 15,322
- Payout: US$300,000

United States TV coverage
- Network: ESPN
- Announcers: Drew Carter (play-by-play), Aaron Murray (analyst), and Lauren Sisler (sideline)

International TV coverage
- Network: ESPN Deportes

The 2022 Camellia Bowl was a college football bowl game played on December 27, 2022, at the Cramton Bowl in Montgomery, Alabama. The ninth annual Camellia Bowl, the game featured the Georgia Southern Eagles from the Sun Belt Conference and the Buffalo Bulls from the Mid-American Conference. The game began at 11:02 a.m. CST and was aired on ESPN. It was one of the 2022–23 bowl games concluding the 2022 FBS football season. Buffalo defeated Georgia Southern, 23–21, to claim their third consecutive bowl victory.

== Teams ==
Consistent with conference tie-ins, the bowl featured teams from the Mid-American Conference (MAC) and the Sun Belt Conference. This was the first meeting between Buffalo of the MAC and Georgia Southern of the Sun Belt.

=== Georgia Southern Eagles ===
Georgia Southern finished their regular season with a 6–6 record, 3–5 in conference play. They started their season with three wins in four games, and ended with three losses in four games. They became bowl eligible with a double-overtime win against Appalachian State in their final regular-season contest. The Eagles faced one ranked opponent during the season, James Madison, whom they defeated in mid-October. This was Georgia Southern's fifth bowl appearance in program history. They previously played in, and won, the 2018 edition of the Camellia Bowl. Eagles starting quarterback Kyle Vantrease previously played for Buffalo before changing schools prior to the 2022 season.

=== Buffalo Bulls ===
Buffalo also played to a 6–6 regular-season record, posting a 5–3 record in conference play. After starting the season with three losses, they won five games in a row, then lost three of their final four games. They became bowl eligible with a one-point win over Akron in their final regular-season contest. The Bulls did not face any ranked FBS opponents during the season. This was their seventh bowl game in program history; their most recent bowl appearance had been a win in the 2020 edition of the Camellia Bowl.

Because of the winter storm impacting Buffalo, New York, and the surrounding areas before and during the game, Buffalo's band, cheerleaders, and radio crew were unable to be at the game. The football team was forced to depart Buffalo earlier than planned, as the weather forced the cancellation of numerous flights in that area and ultimately caused the closure of Buffalo Niagara International Airport.

== Game summary ==
The Camellia Bowl was televised by ESPN, with a commentary team of Drew Carter, Aaron Murray, and Lauren Sisler.

The Buffalo radio broadcast crew of Paul Peck and Josh Whetzel were unable to leave Buffalo because of the snowstorm. They were replaced on short notice by J.T. Crabtree and Pat Greenwood, the University of South Alabama radio broadcast crew.

The game's officiating crew, representing the American Athletic Conference, was led by referee Luke Richmond and umpire Joe Pennucci. The game was played at the Cramton Bowl in Montgomery, Alabama, where the weather at kickoff was sunny with a temperature of 47 °F (8 °C).

=== First half ===
Alex McNulty started the game with the opening kickoff, which went out for a touchback. Georgia Southern quarterback Kyle Vantrease passed on each of the first five plays of the game, three of which were complete for 5, 13, and 11 yards to Evan Lester, Khaleb Hood, and Jjay Mcafee. A false start penalty set them back on third down several plays later, and they were unable to pick up the required yardage. Anthony Beck II was brought in for the game's first punt, which was fair caught at the Buffalo 10-yard-line. Buffalo opted to begin their drive with three straight run plays by Mike Washington, which gained a total of 14 yards, after which Cole Snyder completed his first pass, which was good for 7 yards to Justin Marshall. The two connected again later for a 15-yard gain and another first down, but the Bulls were unable to keep up the progress and punted on 4th & 8 from midfield. Georgia Southern's second drive was unproductive as it resulted in the first three-and-out of the game after two incomplete passes and a 1-yard rush. The punt was muffed by Buffalo's Chandler Baker but he was able to recover the ball and keep possession for the Bulls at their own 44-yard-line. The Bulls were similarly unsuccessful on their second drive as they finished with a net loss of six yards and a punt which was downed at the Georgia Southern 45-yard-line. Georgia Southern took over with four minutes to play and earned a first down with an 11-yard pass on their first play. Another penalty set them back several plays later, though, and they punted again on 4th & 8. The kick was fair caught on the Buffalo 10-yard-line and Snyder completed a pass to Robbie Mangas for 11 yards to start the drive for the Bulls. After that initial success, the Bulls went three-and-out; Georgia Southern started their next drive on their own 29-yard-line with one second to go and a 1-yard rush by Tyler Bride ended the quarter.

The Eagles started the second quarter with an incomplete pass but followed that up with three consecutive passes for gains of 15, 26, and 22 yards, which each earned first downs and reached the Buffalo 7-yard-line. They weren't able to punch the ball in from short distance and settled for a 23-yard field goal to open the game's scoring. Buffalo responded with a score of their own: after reaching the Georgia Southern 45-yard-line, Snyder completed a pass to Quian Williams for 13 yards before passing to Justin Marshall for a 32-yard touchdown, giving the Bulls the lead. The ensuing McNulty kickoff was a touchback, and OJ Arnold began the Eagles' drive with a 29-yard rush followed by Vantrease passes for 19 and 17 yards, which reached the Buffalo 10-yard-line. The Georgia Southern offense was again unable to find the end zone, and settled for another short field goal to narrow the deficit to one point. The Bulls got the ball back with just under six minutes to play and gained a first down on their first play; several plays later Snyder passed to Williams for a 36-yard gain to advance to the Georgia Southern 17-yard-line. Five plays later, the Bulls lengthened their lead with a 5-yard rush by Ahmed. Georgia Southern's last possession of the half began with 45 seconds remaining; the Eagles were able to advance to their own 49-yard-line before the end of the half.

=== Second half ===
Georgia Southern got off to a good start in the second half as they forced a fumble on the first play from scrimmage to get possession immediately, and followed that up with a 79-yard touchdown pass and a successful two-point conversion to tie the game only 26 seconds into the third quarter. Buffalo's second drive went better than their first, as an unnecessary roughness penalty moved them forwards 15 yards on their first play and they crossed midfield two plays later. A pair of Snyder passes totaling 20 yards got them to the Georgia Southern 29-yard-line, and after finding themselves unable to pick up another first down, the Bulls brought on McNulty to try a 33-yard field goal, which he made. The Bulls got the ball back quickly as their defense forced a fumble of their own with Jalen McNair recovering the ball on the Georgia Southern 18-yard-line. They gained a first down but stalled after facing 1st & Goal on the 2-yard-line and kicked another short field goal, which McNulty made. Trailing by six points, the Eagles gained two first downs in their first three plays with Vantrease passing to Marcus Sanders Jr. and Beau Johnson. Vantrease picked up another first down on the ground several plays later but then threw three incomplete passes and the Eagles punted. Their defense was able to hold Buffalo to a similar result, as a holding penalty set them back and a delay of game penalty forced them to punt on 4th & 6. The kick was downed at the Georgia Southern 2-yard-line, and the Eagles took over with 1:28 to play. They earned a first down via a personal foul called against Buffalo, and Arnold carried the ball three times to close out the quarter.

The Eagles began the fourth quarter with 1st & 10 from their own 42-yard-line, and Vantrease threw two incomplete passes to start the quarter before being intercepted by Dylan Powell at the Georgia Southern 27-yard-line; the interception was returned to the Georgia Southern 40-yard-line. Buffalo was able to take advantage of this miscue and did so with nine consecutive run plays, all of which were to Ahmed. The Bulls gained three first downs in the process before Ahmed was stopped at the 1-yard-line on 3rd & Goal and McNulty came on to attempt a 20-yard field goal, which he made to extend Buffalo's lead to nine points. Vantrease completed passes to Arnold and Hood at the beginning of Georgia Southern's ensuing possession, and Arnold's carry for 11 yards picked up a first down for the Eagles. They faced 4th & 7 shortly afterwards, but converted with a 42-yard pass from Vantrease to Johnson, which reached the Buffalo 19-yard-line. A 13-yard pass to Mcafee several plays later put the Eagles in the end zone, and Alex Raynor's extra point pulled Georgia Southern within two points. The Eagles opted to kick it deep to the Bulls, rather than attempting an onside kick, and Buffalo took over at their own 25-yard-line. The converted a third down with a 9-yard pass from Snyder to Marshall, and Ahmed ran three times after that for a total of ten yards, the last carry of which earned another first down. From there, the Bulls took a knee to run out the rest of the clock and finish the game as 23–21 winners.

=== Scoring summary ===
2022 Camellia Bowl

Quarter	1	2	3	4	Total
Georgia Southern	0	6	8	7	21
Buffalo	0	14	6	3	23

at Cramton Bowl • Montgomery, Alabama

- Date: Tuesday, December 27, 2022
- Game time: 11:00 a.m. CST
- Game weather: Sunny • Temperature: 47 °F (8 °C) • Wind: Northwest 3 mph (4.8 km/h)
- Game attendance: 15,322
- Referee: Luke Richmond
- TV announcers (ESPN): Drew Carter (play-by-play), Aaron Murray (analyst), and Lauren Sisler (sideline)
- Box score

Scoring summary

Quarter	Time	Drive			Team	Scoring information	Score	
Quarter	Time	Plays	Yards	TOP	Team	Scoring information	Georgia Southern	Buffalo
2	11:50	9	65	3:20	Georgia Southern	23-yard field goal by Alex Raynor	3	0
2	7:46	11	81	4:04	Buffalo	Justin Marshall 32-yard touchdown reception from Cole Snyder, Alex McNulty kick good	3	7
2	5:42	7	71	2:04	Georgia Southern	21-yard field goal by Alex Raynor	6	7
2	0:45	10	75	4:57	Buffalo	Tajay Ahmed 5-yard touchdown run, Alex McNulty kick good	6	14
3	14:34	1	79	0:14	Georgia Southern	Joshua Thompson 79-yard touchdown reception from Kyle Vantrease, 2-point pass good	14	14
3	9:48	14	60	4:46	Buffalo	33-yard field goal by Alex McNulty	14	17
3	6:53	7	12	2:47	Buffalo	24-yard field goal by Alex McNulty	14	20
4	8:38	10	38	5:59	Buffalo	20-yard field goal by Alex McNulty	14	23
4	3:38	13	90	5:00	Georgia Southern	Jjay Mcafee 13-yard touchdown reception from Kyle Vantrease, Alex Raynor kick good	21	23
"TOP" = time of possession. For other American football terms, see Glossary of American football.							21	23

== Statistics ==
Team statistical comparison
Statistic	Georgia Southern	Buffalo
First downs	22	25
First downs rushing	6	9
First downs passing	15	15
First downs penalty	1	1
Third down efficiency	7–15	12–19
Fourth down efficiency	1–1	0–0
Total plays–net yards	67–444	81–387
Rushing attempts–net yards	20–89	43–122
Yards per rush	4.5	2.8
Yards passing	355	265
Pass completions–attempts	29–47	21–38
Interceptions thrown	1	0
Punt returns–total yards	2–25	1–0
Kickoff returns–total yards	1–18	1–19
Punts–average yardage	4–36.5	4–47
Fumbles–lost	1–1	2–1
Penalties–yards	6–50	3–30
Time of possession	21:54	38:06

Georgia Southern statistics
Eagles passing
	C–A	Yds	TD–INT
Kyle Vantrease	28–45	352	2–1
Dalen Cobb	1–1	3	0–0
Eagles rushing
	Car	Yds	TD
OJ Arnold	12	68	0
Kyle Vantrease	2	9	0
AJ Brown	1	5	0
Gerald Green	2	5	0
Tyler Bride	1	3	0
Jjay Mcafee	1	3	0
Tyler Jordan	1	−4	0
Eagles receiving
	Rec	Yds	TD
Beau Johnson	5	118	0
Joshua Thompson	1	79	1
Ezrah Archie	3	42	0
Jjay Mcafee	4	35	1
Khaleb Hood	7	29	0
Marcus Sanders Jr.	3	20	0
Dalen Cobb	1	11	0
AJ Brown	1	7	0
OJ Arnold	2	6	0
Evan Lester	1	5	0
Kyle Vantrease	1	3	0

Buffalo statistics
Bulls passing
	C–A	Yds	TD–INT
Cole Snyder	21–38	265	1–0
Bulls rushing
	Car	Yds	TD
Tajay Ahmed	27	98	1
Mike Washington	7	19	0
Cole Snyder	4	6	0
Mark Scott	3	3	0
Bulls receiving
	Rec	Yds	TD
Justin Marshall	11	127	1
Quian Williams	5	100	0
Tajay Ahmed	2	17	0
Robbie Mangas	2	16	0
Marlyn Johnson	1	5	0

== Aftermath ==
Buffalo, who finished their season 7–6 with the victory, concluded their fourth winning season in the last five years; it was their first winning season of two under head coach Maurice Linguist. Bulls wide receiver Justin Marshall was named most valuable player.

The Eagles fell to 6–7, though quarterback Kyle Vantrease surpassed 4,000 passing yards on the season during the game and barely missed setting the Sun Belt Conference single-season record.
