= 2022 Appalachian State Mountaineers football team =

American college football season

2022 Appalachian State Mountaineers football
- Conference: Sun Belt Conference
- East Division
- Record: 6–6 (3–5 Sun Belt)
- Head coach: Shawn Clark (3rd season)
- Offensive coordinator: Kevin Barbay (1st season)
- Offensive scheme: Pro-style
- Defensive coordinator: Dale Jones (6th season)
- Base defense: 3–4
- Home stadium: Kidd Brewer Stadium

2022 Sun Belt Conference football standings
	Conf.			Overall
Team	W		L	W		L
East Division
James Madison* x	6	–	2	8	–	3
Coastal Carolina xy	6	–	2	9	–	4
Marshall	5	–	3	9	–	4
Georgia Southern	3	–	5	6	–	7
Appalachian State	3	–	5	6	–	6
Georgia State	3	–	5	4	–	8
Old Dominion	2	–	6	3	–	9
West Division
No. 19 Troy xy$	7	–	1	12	–	2
South Alabama x	7	–	1	10	–	3
Southern Miss	4	–	4	7	–	6
Louisiana	4	–	4	6	–	7
Louisiana–Monroe	3	–	5	4	–	8
Texas State	2	–	6	4	–	8
Arkansas State	1	–	7	3	–	9
Championship: Troy 45, Coastal Carolina 26
$ – Conference champion; x – Division champion/co-champions; y – Championship game participant; * – Ineligible for postseason play due to FCS-to-FBS transition rules; Rankings from AP Poll

The 2022 Appalachian State Mountaineers football team represented Appalachian State University during the 2022 NCAA Division I FBS football season. The Mountaineers were led by third-year head coach Shawn Clark. Appalachian State played their home games at Kidd Brewer Stadium on the school's Boone, North Carolina, campus, and competed as a member of the East Division of the Sun Belt Conference.

The Mountaineers finished the season 6–6, going 3–5 in Sun Belt play to finish in a three-way tie for fourth place in the conference's East Division. Despite finishing the season with 6 wins, the Mountaineers were not bowl eligible as two of their wins came against FCS opponents.

== Preseason ==
=== Coaching changes ===
On February 9, 2022, offensive coordinator Frank Ponce was hired as the quarterbacks coach for the Miami Hurricanes. On February 21, Kevin Barbay was hired to be the Mountaineers' new offensive coordinator/quarterbacks coach. Barbay previously served in the same role for the Central Michigan Chippewas.

=== Media poll ===
The Sun Belt media days were held on July 25 and 26. The Mountaineers were predicted to finish in first place in the Sun Belt's East Division. Appalachian State also received 10-of-14 first place votes.

=== Sun Belt Preseason All-Conference teams ===
Offense

1st team

- Camerun Peoples – Running back, RS-JR
- Cooper Hodges – Offensive lineman, RS-JR

2nd team

- Chase Brice – Quarterback, RS-SR
- Nate Noel – Running back, SO
- Damion Daley – Offensive lineman, RS-JR

Defense

2nd team

- Nick Hampton – Linebacker, RS-JR
- Trey Cobb – Linebacker, SR
- Steven Jones Jr. – Defensive back, RS-SR

== Schedule ==
All conference games were announced March 1, 2022.

Date	Time	Opponent	Site	TV	Result	Attendance
September 3	12:00 p.m.	North Carolina*	Kidd Brewer Stadium; Boone, NC	ESPNU	L 61–63	40,168
September 10	3:30 p.m.	at No. 6 Texas A&M*	Kyle Field; College Station, TX	ESPN2	W 17–14	92,664
September 17	3:30 p.m.	Troy	Kidd Brewer Stadium; Boone, NC (College GameDay)	ESPN+	W 32–28	34,406
September 24	3:30 p.m.	James Madison	Kidd Brewer Stadium; Boone, NC	ESPN+	L 28–32	33,248
October 1	3:30 p.m.	The Citadel*	Kidd Brewer Stadium; Boone, NC	ESPN+	W 49–0	30,789
October 8	7:00 p.m.	at Texas State	Bobcat Stadium; San Marcos, TX	ESPN+	L 24–36	25,613
October 19	7:30 p.m.	Georgia State	Kidd Brewer Stadium; Boone, NC	ESPN2	W 42–17	31,757
October 29	3:30 p.m.	Robert Morris*^{†}	Kidd Brewer Stadium; Boone, NC	ESPN+	W 42–3	32,501
November 3	7:30 p.m.	at Coastal Carolina	Brooks Stadium; Conway, SC	ESPN	L 28–35	21,224
November 12	3:30 p.m.	at Marshall	Joan C. Edwards Stadium; Huntington, WV (rivalry)	ESPN+	L 21–28	24,312
November 19	2:30 p.m.	Old Dominion	Kidd Brewer Stadium; Boone, NC	ESPN+	W 27–14	32,096
November 26	6:00 p.m.	at Georgia Southern	Paulson Stadium; Statesboro, GA (rivalry)	ESPN+	L 48–51 ^{2OT}	18,683
*Non-conference game; ^{†}Homecoming; Rankings from AP Poll (and CFP Rankings, after November 1) – Released prior to game; All times are in Eastern time

== Game summaries ==
=== North Carolina ===
North Carolina Tar Heels at Appalachian State Mountaineers – Game summary

Quarter	1	2	3	4	Total
Tar Heels	7	21	13	22	63
Mountaineers	14	7	0	40	61

at Kidd Brewer Stadium, Boone, North Carolina

- Date: September 3
- Game time: 12:00 p.m. EDT
- Game weather: Cloudy, 73 °F (23 °C)
- Game attendance: 40,168
- Referee: Jerry Magallanes
- TV announcers (ESPNU): Mark Neely, Charles Arbuckle and Dana Boyle
- Box score, Recap

Game information
First quarter
- APP – Nate Noel 52-yard run (Michael Hughes kick), 11:36. Mountaineers 7–0. Drive: 8 plays, 75 yards, 3:24.
- UNC – J. J. Jones 23-yard pass from Drake Maye (Noah Brunette kick), 8:21. Tied 7–7. Drive: 8 plays, 75 yards, 3:15.
- APP – Henry Pearson 22-yard pass from Chase Brice (Michael Hughes kick), 6:35. Mountaineers 14–7. Drive: 5 plays, 75 yards, 1:46.

Second quarter

- APP – Christian Wells 2-yard pass from Chase Brice (Michael Hughes kick), 14:18. Mountaineers 21–7. Drive: 11 plays, 65 yards, 5:21.
- UNC – Kobe Paysour 14-yard pass from Drake Maye (Noah Brunette kick), 9:30. Mountaineers 21–14. Drive: 10 plays, 75 yards, 4:48.
- UNC – George Pettaway 21-yard run (Noah Brunette kick), 4:08. Tied 21–21. Drive: 7 plays, 66 yards, 3:05.
- UNC – Bryson Nesbit 10-yard pass from Drake Maye (Noah Brunette kick), 0:01. Tar Heels 28–21. Drive: 9 plays, 72 yards, 1:43.

Third quarter

- UNC – Drake Maye 12-yard run (Noah Brunette kick), 11:55. Tar Heels 35–21. Drive: 8 plays, 75 yards, 3:05.
- UNC – Noah Brunette 47-yard field goal, 2:21. Tar Heels 38–21. Drive: 8 plays, 34 yards, 3:08.
- UNC – Noah Brunette 44-yard field goal, 0:11. Tar Heels 41–21. Drive: 4 plays, 2 yards, 1:49.

Fourth quarter

- APP – Nate Noel 1-yard run (Michael Hughes kick), 12:10. Tar Heels 41–28. Drive: 8 plays, 71 yards, 2:55.
- APP – Miller Gibbs 13-yard pass from Chase Brice (Michael Hughes kick), 10:37. Tar Heels 41–35. Drive: 3 plays, 28 yards, 1:33.
- UNC – Omarion Hampton 2-yard run (Drake Maye run), 9:25. Tar Heels 49–35. Drive: 3 plays, 75 yards, 1:12.
- APP – Christian Horn 31-yard pass from Chase Brice (Michael Hughes kick), 7:20. Tar Heels 49–42. Drive: 7 plays, 77 yards, 2:01.
- APP – Camerun Peoples 38-yard run (Michael Hughes kick), 4:00. Tied 49–49. Drive: 3 plays, 64 yards, 0:46.
- UNC – D. J. Jones 42-yard pass from Drake Maye (Noah Brunette kick), 2:50. Tar Heels 56–49. Drive: 5 plays, 75 yards, 1:10.
- APP – Dashaun Davis 28-yard pass from Chase Brice (pass failed), 0:31. Tar Heels 56–55. Drive: 8 plays, 75 yards, 2:19.
- UNC – Bryson Nesbit 43-yard kickoff return (Noah Brunette kick), 0:28. Tar Heels 63–55.
- APP – Kaedin Robinson 26-yard pass from Chase Brice (run failed), 0:09. Tar Heels 63–61. Drive: 2 plays, 48 yards, 0:10.

Statistics

Statistics	UNC	APP
First downs	30	38
Total yards	567	649
Rushing yards	215	288
Passing yards	352	361
Turnovers	1	1
Time of possession	27:57	32:03

Team	Category	Player	Statistics
North Carolina	Passing	Drake Maye	24/36, 352 yards, 4 TD
North Carolina	Rushing	Caleb Hood	6 rushes, 87 yards
North Carolina	Receiving	Kobe Paysour	8 receptions, 92 yards, TD
Appalachian State	Passing	Chase Brice	25/36, 361 yards, 6 TD, INT
Appalachian State	Rushing	Nate Noel	14 rushes, 116 yards, 2 TD
Appalachian State	Receiving	Dashaun Davis	6 receptions, 72 yards, TD

=== At No. 6 Texas A&M ===
Appalachian State Mountaineers (0–1) at No. 6 Texas A&M Aggies (1–0) – Game summary

Quarter	1	2	3	4	Total
Mountaineers	0	7	7	3	17
No. 6 Aggies	0	7	7	0	14

at Kyle Field, College Station, Texas

- Date: September 10
- Game time: 3:30 p.m. EDT / 2:30 p.m. CDT
- Game weather: Sunny, 86 °F (30 °C)
- Game attendance: 92,664
- Referee: Steve Marlow
- TV announcers (ESPN2): Anish Shroff, Brock Osweiler and Taylor McGregor
- Box score, Recap

Game information
First quarter
- No scoring plays

Second quarter

- APP – Ahmani Marshall 4-yard run (Michael Hughes kick), 14:56. Mountaineers 7–0. Drive: 5 plays, 77 yards, 1:28.
- TAMU – De’Von Achane 26-yard run (Caden Davis kick), 11:38. Tied 7–7. Drive: 7 plays, 75 yards, 3:18.

Third quarter

- APP – Henry Pearson 9-yard pass from Chase Brice (Michael Hughes kick), 2:34. Mountaineers 14–7. Drive: 11 plays, 62 yards, 6:22.
- TAMU – De’Von Achane 95-yard kickoff return (Caden Davis kick), 2:20. Tied 14–14.

Fourth quarter

- APP – Michael Hughes 29-yard field goal, 8:05. Mountaineers 17–14. Drive: 18 plays, 63 yards, 9:15.

Statistics

Statistics	APP	TAMU
First downs	22	9
Total yards	315	186
Rushing yards	181	89
Passing yards	134	97
Turnovers	0	2
Time of possession	41:29	18:31

Team	Category	Player	Statistics
Appalachian State	Passing	Chase Brice	15/30, 134 yards, TD
Appalachian State	Rushing	Camerun Peoples	19 rushes, 112 yards
Appalachian State	Receiving	Dashaun Davis	4 receptions, 39 yards
Texas A&M	Passing	Haynes King	13/20, 97 yards
Texas A&M	Rushing	De’Von Achane	10 rushes, 66 yards, TD
Texas A&M	Receiving	Evan Stewart	5 receptions, 48 yards

This was Appalachian State's first win over an AP Top 10 team since a 34–32 victory over Michigan in 2007.

=== Troy ===
Troy Trojans (1–1) at Appalachian State Mountaineers (1–1) – Game summary

Quarter	1	2	3	4	Total
Trojans	7	14	0	7	28
Mountaineers	7	7	10	8	32

at Kidd Brewer Stadium, Boone, North Carolina

- Date: September 17
- Game time: 3:30 p.m. EDT
- Game weather: Cloudy, 72 °F (22 °C)
- Game attendance: 34,406
- Referee: Jeremy Parker
- TV announcers (ESPN+): David Jackson and Avery Hall
- Box score, Recap

Game information
First quarter
- APP – Christian Wells 17-yard pass from Chase Brice (Michael Hughes kick), 13:48. Mountaineers 7–0. Drive: 3 plays, 38 yards, 5:57.
- TROY – D. K. Billingsley 19-yard run (Brooks Bruce kick), 6:49. Tied 7–7. Drive: 13 plays, 75 yards, 6:59.

Second quarter

- TROY – Gunnar Watson 1-yard run (Brooks Bruce kick), 8:43. Trojans 14–7. Drive: 8 plays, 81 yards, 3:51.
- APP – Anderson Castle 18-yard pass from Chase Brice (Michael Hughes kick), 1:22. Tied 14–14. Drive: 14 plays, 75 yards, 7:21.
- TROY – Gunnar Watson 1-yard run (Brooks Bruce kick), 0:00. Trojans 21–14. Drive: 12 plays, 75 yards, 1:22.

Third quarter

- APP – Daetrich Harrington 19-yard run (Michael Hughes kick), 11:35. Tied 21–21. Drive: 9 plays, 75 yards, 3:25.
- APP – Michael Hughes 23-yard field goal, 0:29. Mountaineers 24–21. Drive: 10 plays, 74 yards, 4:37.

Fourth quarter

- TROY – Kimani Vidal 1-yard run (Brooks Bruce kick), 10:10. Trojans 28–24. Drive: 12 plays, 79 yards, 5:14.
- APP – Gunnar Watson safety, 0:20. Trojans 28–26.
- APP – Christian Horn 53-yard pass from Chase Brice, 0:00. Mountaineers 32–28. Drive: 4 plays, 53 yards, 0:15.

Statistics

Statistics	TROY	APP
First downs	25	23
Total yards	359	456
Rushing yards	57	161
Passing yards	302	295
Turnovers	1	0
Time of possession	27:52	32:08

Team	Category	Player	Statistics
Troy	Passing	Gunnar Watson	23/37, 302 yards, INT
Troy	Rushing	D. K. Billingsley	6 rushes, 38 yards, TD
Troy	Receiving	Deshon Stoudemire	6 receptions, 70 yards
Appalachian State	Passing	Chase Brice	22/34, 287 yards, 2 TD
Appalachian State	Rushing	Camerun Peoples	17 rushes, 84 yards
Appalachian State	Receiving	Christian Horn	5 receptions, 98 yards, TD

College GameDay traveled to Boone, North Carolina for the first time.

The two teams went back and forth for most of the game, with the largest lead being only 7 points. The Trojans took a 28–24 lead early in the 4th quarter, a score that would stand for almost ten minutes. On their second-to-last offensive drive, the Mountaineers marched down to the Trojans' 2-yard line, but could not convert on 4th down and turned the ball over on downs. Troy could not pick up a 1st down and decided to go for it on 4th. On 4th down, Trojan quarterback Gunnar Watson intentionally ran out of his own end zone for a safety. On the kickoff, Ahmani Marshall returned the kick to the Mountaineers' 47-yard line with just 0:15 left to play. On the final play of the game, Chase Brice threw a Hail Mary pass that Troy's defense tried to knock down, but Christian Horn caught the deflected pass and ran it in for the game-winning touchdown.

=== James Madison ===
James Madison Dukes (2–0) at Appalachian State Mountaineers (2–1) – Game summary

Quarter	1	2	3	4	Total
Dukes	3	7	7	15	32
Mountaineers	0	28	0	0	28

at Kidd Brewer Stadium, Boone, North Carolina

- Date: September 24
- Game time: 3:30 p.m. EDT
- Game weather: Sunny, 67 °F (19 °C)
- Game attendance: 33,248
- Referee: Trennins Livingston
- TV announcers (ESPN+): David Jackson and Avery Hall
- Box score, Recap

Game information
First quarter
- JMU – Camden Wise 27-yard field goal, 8:10. Dukes 3–0. Drive: 13 plays, 65 yards, 6:50.

Second quarter

- APP – Camerun Peoples 2-yard run (Michael Hughes kick), 13:45. Mountaineers 7–3. Drive: 9 plays, 58 yards, 3:54.
- APP – Miller Gibbs 10-yard pass from Chase Brice (Michael Hughes kick), 11:45. Mountaineers 14–3. Drive: 4 plays, 22 yards, 1:53.
- APP – Dalton Stroman 27-yard pass from Chase Brice (Michael Hughes kick), 8:37. Mountaineers 21–3. Drive: 3 plays, 68 yards, 1:07.
- APP – Nate Noel 5-yard run (Michael Hughes kick), 6:10. Mountaineers 28–3. Drive: 3 plays, 16 yards, 0:46.
- JMU – Kaelon Black 23-yard pass from Todd Centeio (Camden Wise kick), 2:16. Mountaineers 28–10. Drive: 8 plays, 75 yards, 3:54.

Third quarter

- JMU – Todd Centeio 2-yard run (Camden Wise kick), 1:19. Mountaineers 28–17. Drive: 6 plays, 41 yards, 2:53.

Fourth quarter

- JMU – Terrance Greene Jr. 36-yard pass from Todd Centeio (Todd Centeio pass to Kris Thornton), 11:28. Mountaineers 28–25. Drive: 5 plays, 92 yards, 1:58.
- JMU – Kaelon Black 4-yard run (Camden Wise kick), 10:36. Dukes 32–28. Drive: 2 plays, 9 yards, 0:35.

Statistics

Statistics	JMU	APP
First downs	19	15
Total yards	376	298
Rushing yards	172	63
Passing yards	204	235
Turnovers	2	2
Time of possession	33:28	26:32

Team	Category	Player	Statistics
James Madison	Passing	Todd Centeio	16/28, 204 yards, 2 TD
James Madison	Rushing	Kaelon Black	18 rushes, 85 yards, TD
James Madison	Receiving	Reggie Brown	4 receptions, 81 yards
Appalachian State	Passing	Chase Brice	17/28, 235 yards, 2 TD, INT
Appalachian State	Rushing	Ahmani Marshall	8 rushes, 40 yards
Appalachian State	Receiving	Dashaun Davis	3 receptions, 57 yards

=== The Citadel ===
The Citadel Bulldogs (1–2) at Appalachian State Mountaineers (2–2) – Game summary

Quarter	1	2	3	4	Total
Bulldogs	0	0	0	0	0
Mountaineers	14	21	7	7	49

at Kidd Brewer Stadium, Boone, North Carolina

- Date: October 1
- Game time: 3:30 p.m. EDT
- Game weather: Rain, 50 °F (10 °C)
- Game attendance: 30,789
- Referee: Javarro Edwards
- TV announcers (ESPN+): David Jackson and Avery Hall

Game information
First quarter
- APP – Dashaun Davis 44 yard pass from Chase Brice (Michael Hughs kick), 12:18. Mountaineers 7–0. Drive: 6 plays, 74 yards, 2:37.
- APP – Chase Brice 1 yard run (Michael Hughs kick), 2:38. Mountaineers 14–0. Drive: 8 plays, 75 yards, 3:54.

Second quarter'

- APP – Eli Wilson 8 yard pass from Chase Brice (Michael Hughs kick), 11:55. Mountaineers 21–0. Drive: 8 plays, 65 yards, 3:35.
- APP – Camerun Peoples 73 yard run (Michael Hughs kick), 9:31. Mountaineers 28–0. Drive: 1 play, 73 yards, 0:15.
- APP – Christian Horn 22 yard pass from Chase Brice (Michael Hughs kick), 4:56. Mountaineers 35–0. Drive: 3 plays, 33 yards, 0:46.

Third quarter

- APP – Christian Horn 80 yard pass from Chase Brice (Michael Hughs kick), 3:23. Mountaineers 42–0. Drive: 1 play, 80 yards, 0:15.

Fourth quarter

- APP – Kanye Roberts 4 yard run (Michael Hughs kick), 6:40. Mountaineers 49–0. Drive: 7 plays, 60 yards, 3:20.

Statistics

Statistics	CIT	APP
First downs	13	21
Total yards	223	545
Rushing yards	172	247
Passing yards	51	298
Turnovers	2	0
Time of possession	39:51	20:04

Team	Category	Player	Statistics
The Citadel	Passing	Peyton Derrick	2/7, 45 yards, 1 INT
The Citadel	Rushing	Sam Llewellyn	10 carries, 41 yards
The Citadel	Receiving	Jay Graves-Billips	2 receptions, 42 yards
Appalachian State	Passing	Chase Brice	12/18, 265 yards, 4 TD
Appalachian State	Rushing	Camerun Peoples	4 carries, 102 yards, 1 TD
Appalachian State	Receiving	Christian Horn	3 receptions 132 yards, 2 TD

=== At Texas State ===
Appalachian State Mountaineers (3–2) at Texas State Bobcats (2–3) – Game summary

Quarter	1	2	3	4	Total
Mountaineers	0	3	7	14	24
Bobcats	7	17	9	3	36

at Bobcat Stadium, San Marcos, Texas

- Date: October 8
- Game time: 7:00 p.m. EDT / 6:00 p.m. CDT
- Game weather: Sunny
- Game attendance: 25,613
- Referee: Wayne Winkler
- TV announcers (ESPN+): Brant Freeman, Keith Moreland, Koral Riggs

Statistics

Statistics	APP	TXST
First downs	20	22
Total yards	436	334
Rushing yards	41	53
Passing yards	395	281
Turnovers	2	1
Time of possession	27:21	32:39

Team	Category	Player	Statistics
Appalachian State	Passing	Chase Brice	40/53, 395 yards, 3 TD, 1 INT
Appalachian State	Rushing	Nate Noel	5 carries, 19 yards
Appalachian State	Receiving	Dalton Stroman	5 receptions, 104 yards, 1 TD
Texas State	Passing	Layne Hatcher	26/36, 281 yards, 2 TD, 1 INT
Texas State	Rushing	Lincoln Pare	20 carries, 64 yards, 1 TD
Texas State	Receiving	Ashtyn Hawkins	6 receptions, 105 yards, 1 TD

=== Georgia State ===
Georgia State Panthers (2–4) at Appalachian State Mountaineers (3–3) – Game summary

Quarter	1	2	3	4	Total
Panthers	14	0	0	3	17
Mountaineers	0	7	21	14	42

at Kidd Brewer Stadium, Boone, North Carolina

- Date: October 19
- Game time: 7:30 p.m. EDT
- Game weather: Clear
- Game attendance: 31,757
- Referee: Ted Pitts
- TV announcers (ESPN2): Drew Carter, Aaron Murray, Marilyn Payne

Statistics

Statistics	GAST	APP
First downs	20	26
Total yards	301	466
Rushing yards	228	404
Passing yards	73	62
Turnovers	4	1
Time of possession	23:26	36:34

Team	Category	Player	Statistics
Georgia State	Passing	Darren Grainger	9/23, 73 yards, 1 INT
Georgia State	Rushing	Darren Grainger	19 carries, 100 yards, 1 TD
Georgia State	Receiving	Ahmon Green	2 receptions, 24 yards
Appalachian State	Passing	Chase Brice	7/17, 62 yards
Appalachian State	Rushing	Camerun Peoples	23 carries, 168 yards, 2 TD
Appalachian State	Receiving	Henry Pearson	1 reception, 31 yards

=== Robert Morris ===
Robert Morris Colonials at Appalachian State Mountaineers – Game summary

Quarter	1	2	3	4	Total
Colonials	3	0	0	0	3
Mountaineers	14	7	14	7	42

at Kidd Brewer Stadium, Boone, North Carolina

- Date: October 29
- Game weather: Clear
- Game attendance: 32,501
- Referee: Javarro Edwards
- TV announcers (ESPN+): David Jackson, Avery Hall

Statistics

Statistics	RMU	APP
First downs	7	29
Total yards	148	512
Rushing yards	78	287
Passing yards	70	225
Turnovers	1	1
Time of possession	32:37	31:53

Team	Category	Player	Statistics
Robert Morris	Passing	Anthony Chiccitt	10/27, 70 yards, 1 INT
Robert Morris	Rushing	Alijah Jackson	11 carries, 36 yards
Robert Morris	Receiving	Demonte Martin	1 reception, 37 yards
Appalachian State	Passing	Chase Brice	17/23, 185 yards, 4 TD, 1 INT
Appalachian State	Rushing	Nate Noel	5 carries, 88 yards
Appalachian State	Receiving	Dashaun Davis	3 receptions, 57 yards, 1 TD

=== At Coastal Carolina ===
Appalachian State Mountaineers at Coastal Carolina Chanticleers – Game summary

Quarter	1	2	3	4	Total
Mountaineers	7	7	0	14	28
Chanticleers	14	7	0	14	35

at Brooks Stadium, Conway, South Carolina

- Date: November 3
- Game time: 7:30 p.m. EST
- Game weather: Sunny
- Game attendance: 21,224
- Referee: Wayne Winkler
- TV announcers (ESPN): Matt Barrie, Louis Riddick, Harry Lyles Jr.

Statistics

Statistics	APP	CCU
First downs	16	23
Total yards	367	476
Rushing yards	88	192
Passing yards	279	284
Turnovers	2	1
Time of possession	22:04	37:56

Team	Category	Player	Statistics
Appalachian State	Passing	Chase Brice	19/28, 279 yards, 2 TD, 1 INT
Appalachian State	Rushing	Nate Noel	6 carries, 31 yards
Appalachian State	Receiving	Christian Horn	4 receptions, 57 yards
Coastal Carolina	Passing	Grayson McCall	18/26, 253 yards, 2 TD
Coastal Carolina	Rushing	Jared Brown	3 carries, 84 yards, 1 TD
Coastal Carolina	Receiving	Sam Pickney	4 receptions, 80 yards, 1 TD

=== At Marshall ===
Appalachian State Mountaineers at Marshall Thundering Herd – Game summary

Quarter	1	2	3	4	Total
Mountaineers	0	7	7	7	21
Thundering Herd	7	7	14	0	28

at Joan C. Edwards Stadium, Huntington, West Virginia

- Date: November 12
- Game time: 3:30 p.m. EST
- Game weather: Sunny
- Game attendance: 24,312
- Referee: Jeremy Parker
- TV announcers (ESPN+): Chad Bush (play-by-play), Doug Chapman (analyst)

Game information

First quarter

- (8:09) MRSH – Khalan Laborn 1 yard run, Rece Verhoff kick (Drive: 15 plays, 80 yards, 6:45; Marshall 7–0)

Second quarter

- (7:12) MRSH – Jayden Harrison 5 yard pass from Cam Fancher, Rece Verhoff kick (Drive: 9 plays, 80 yards, 4:02; Marshall 14–0)
- (1:00) APP – Daetrich Harrington 1 yard run, Michael Hughes kick (Drive: 10 plays, 32 yards, 5:15; Marshall 14–7)

Third quarter

- (11:00) MRSH – Danisus Miller 0 yard return of blocked punt, Rece Verhoff kick (Marshall 21–7)
- (10:47) APP – Milan Tucker 96 yard kickoff return, Michael Hughes kick (Marshall 21–14)
- (7:57) MRSH – Corey Gammage 19 yard pass from Cam Fancher, Rece Verhoff kick (Drive: 8 plays, 82 yards, 2:41; Marshall 28–14)

Fourth quarter

- (14:55) APP – Henry Pearson 14 yard pass from Chase Brice, Michael Hughes kick (Drive: 9 plays, 50 yards, 3:00; Marshall 28–21)

Statistics

Statistics	APP	MRSH
First downs	17	17
Total yards	293	341
Rushing yards	116	121
Passing yards	177	220
Turnovers	2	2
Time of possession	31:46	28:14

Team	Category	Player	Statistics
Appalachian State	Passing	Chase Brice	15/34, 177 yards, 1 TD, 1 INT
Appalachian State	Rushing	Nate Noel	18 carries, 72 yards
Appalachian State	Receiving	Christian Horn	4 receptions, 66 yards
Marshall	Passing	Cam Fancher	16/28, 225 yards, 2 TD, 1 INT
Marshall	Rushing	Khalan Laborn	18 carries, 53 yards, 1 TD
Marshall	Receiving	Charles Montgomery	5 receptions, 109 yards

=== Old Dominion ===
Old Dominion Monarchs at Appalachian State Mountaineers – Game summary

Quarter	1	2	3	4	Total
Monarchs	0	0	0	14	14
Mountaineers	10	14	3	0	27

at Kidd Brewer Stadium, Boone, North Carolina

- Date: November 19
- Game time: 2:30 p.m. EST
- Game weather: Sunny
- Game attendance: 32,096
- Referee: Ted Pitts
- TV announcers (ESPN+): David Jackson, Avery Hall

Statistics

Statistics	ODU	APP
First downs	20	24
Total yards	394	498
Rushing yards	86	207
Passing yards	308	291
Turnovers	1	0
Time of possession	27:18	32:42

Team	Category	Player	Statistics
Old Dominion	Passing	Hayden Wolff	22/37, 308 yards, 2 TD
Old Dominion	Rushing	Blake Watson	10 carries, 69 yards
Old Dominion	Receiving	Javon Harvey	4 receptions, 133 yards, 2 TD
Appalachian State	Passing	Chase Brice	15/21, 291 yards, 2 TD
Appalachian State	Rushing	Ahmani Marshall	19 carries, 137 yards, 1 TD
Appalachian State	Receiving	Kaedin Robinson	3 receptions, 90 yards, 1 TD

=== At Georgia Southern ===
Appalachian State Mountaineers at Georgia Southern Eagles – Game summary

Quarter	1	2	3	4	OT	2OT	Total
Mountaineers	6	14	11	7	7	3	48
Eagles	7	10	14	7	7	6	51

at Paulson Stadium, Statesboro, Georgia

- Date: November 26
- Game time: 6:00 p.m. EST
- Game weather: Cloudy
- Game attendance: 18,683
- Referee: Wayne Winkler
- TV announcers (ESPN+): Danny Waugh, Cole Neely, Emily Grace McWhorter

Statistics

Statistics	APP	GASO
First downs	25	27
Total yards	629	487
Rushing yards	376	102
Passing yards	253	385
Turnovers	0	2
Time of possession	32:33	27:27

Team	Category	Player	Statistics
Appalachian State	Passing	Chase Brice	15/26, 253 yards
Appalachian State	Rushing	Nate Noel	12 carries, 171 yards, 3 TD
Appalachian State	Receiving	Christian Horn	2 receptions, 55 yards
Georgia Southern	Passing	Kyle Vantrease	34/51, 385 yards, 3 TD, 1 INT
Georgia Southern	Rushing	AJ Brown	14 carries, 62 yards, 1 TD
Georgia Southern	Receiving	Jeremy Singleton	10 receptions, 133 yards

== Personnel ==
=== Roster ===
2022 Appalachian State Mountaineers football team roster
Players
Coaches
Offense

Pos.	#	Name	Class
WR	2	Kaedin Robinson	So
RB	3	Ahmani Marshall	So
RB	4	Daetrich Harrington	Sr
RB	5	Nate Noel	So
RB	6	Camerun Peoples	Jr
QB	7	Chase Brice	Sr
WR	8	Jacoby Pinckney	So
QB	10	DC Tabscott	Fr
QB	11	Brady McBride	Jr
WR	12	Michael Hetzel	Fr
WR	13	Christan Horn	So
RB	14	Kanye Roberts	Fr
QB	15	Connor Barry	Fr
QB	16	David Hernandez	Jr
WR	17	Deshaun Davis	So
QB	18	Ryan Burger	Fr
WR	19	Reece Larson	Fr
WR	20	Tyler Page	Sr
WR	21	Elijah Johnson	So
WR	22	Dalton Stroman	Fr
WR	25	Trae Nickelson III	Fr
RB	31	Antonio Yates	Fr
TE	33	Peter Hennigan	So
RB	34	Bradley Davis	Fr
TE	35	Gerry Snyder	Fr
RB	44	Anderson Castle	So
OL	52	Troy Everett	Fr
OL	53	Jake Ganoe	Fr
OL	54	Isaiah Helms	Jr
OL	55	Seth Williams	So
OL	58	Chase Presnell	Fr
OL	62	Bucky Williams	Jr
OL	63	Jayden Ramsey	Fr
OL	64	Chris Lyle	Fr
OL	67	Jack Carter	Jr
OL	70	Cooper Hodges	Jr
OL	72	Markell Samuel	Fr
OL	73	Jaden Lindsay	Fr
OL	74	Anderson Hardy	Jr
OL	75	Damion Daley	Jr
OL	76	Austin Reeves	Fr
OL	77	Colston Powers	Fr
OL	78	Craig McFarland	So
OL	79	Sammy Henderson	So
WR	80	AJ Hall	Jr
TE	81	Miller Gibbs	Jr
WR	82	Jaquan Lowman	Fr
WR	83	Coen Sutton	Fr
TE	85	David Larkins	Fr
TE	86	Kanen Hamlett	Fr
TE	87	Eli Wilson	So
TE	88	Henry Pearson	Sr
TE	89	August Drews	Fr

Defense

Pos.	#	Name	Class
DB	0	Milan Tucker	So
DB	4	Nicholas Ross	Jr
DB	5	Dexter Lawson Jr.	Sr
DB	6	Steven Jones Jr.	Sr
ILB	7	Trey Cobb	Sr
OLB	8	Brendan Harrington	Jr
OLB	9	Nick Hampton	Jr
DB	10	DJ VanHook	Jr
DB	11	Jordan Favors	Fr
ILB	15	Andrew Parker	Jr
DB	16	Omari Philyaw	Fr
DB	17	Isaac Johnson	So
DB	18	James Edwards	Fr
DB	19	Ethan Johnson	Fr
DB	20	Nathan Kibambe	Jr
DB	21	DJ Burks	Fr
DB	25	Jackson Greene	So
OLB	26	Caden Sullivan	Fr
DB	27	Ronald Clarke	So
DB	29	Santana Hopper	Fr
DB	30	Carter Greene	Fr
DB	31	Dyvon McKinney	Fr
ILB	33	Derrell Farrar	Fr
OLB	35	Jalen McLeod	So
DL	36	Kevon Haigler	So
DB	37	Andre Hamilton	Fr
DB	39	Tony Harris	Fr
ILB	40	Logan Doublin	Sr
ILB	41	Cole Becker	Fr
DL	43	Hansky Paillant	Jr
OLB	44	Brodrick Gooch	Fr
LB	45	Trevor Moffitt	Fr
DL	46	Chris Washington	Jr
OLB	47	Colin Guentensberger	So
DL	48	DeShawn McKnight	So
ILB	49	Nate Blanton Jr.	So
DL	50	DeAndre Dingle-Pince	So
ILB	51	Tyler Bird	Sr
DL	51	Andrew Jordan	Fr
ILB	54	Orlando Leon	Fr
ILB	56	Kyle Arnholt	Fr
DL	90	Dorian Pickett	Jr
DL	91	Markus Clark	Fr
DL	93	KaRon White	Fr
DL	94	Stephen Passeggiata	Fr
DL	96	Josiah Wyatt	Fr
DL	97	Kevin Abrams-Verwayne	So
OLB	98	Donovan Spellman	Fr
DL	99	Jordon Earle	Jr

Special teams

Pos.	#	Name	Class
P	30	Clayton Howell	Sr
K	37	Carter Everett	Fr
K	40	Austin Shook	Fr
P	41	Conner Maynard	So
LS	42	Christian Johnstone	Jr
LS	45	Jake Mann	Fr
K	57	Trey Schaneville	Jr
K	99	Michael Hughes	So

Head coach

- Shawn Clark (Appalachian State)

Coordinators/assistant coaches

- Kevin Barbay (Lamar)
  Offensive coordinator/QB
- Justin Watts (Clemson)
  Passing game coordinator/TE
- Lawrence Dawsey (Florida State)
  Wide receivers
- Mark DeBastiani (Shepherd)
  Outside linebackers
- Brian Haines (Marietta College)
  Special teams coordinator/RB
- David Lockwood (West Virginia)
  Safeties
- Rod West (Alabama State)
  Defensive passing game coordinator/cornerbacks
- Matt Greenhalgh (Rhode Island)
  Director of athletic performance for football

Legend

- (C) Team captain
- (S) Suspended
- (I) Ineligible
- Injured
- Redshirt

Roster

=== Coaching staff ===
Name	Position	Consecutive season at Appalachian State
Shawn Clark	Head coach	3rd
Kevin Barbay	Offensive coordinator/quarterbacks coach	1st
Justin Watts	Assistant head coach/recruiting coordinator/tight ends coach	7th
Dale Jones	Defensive coordinator/Inside Linebackers coach	3rd
Lawrence Dawsey	Wide Receivers coach	1st
Mark DeBastiani	Outside linebackers coach	2nd
Brian Haines	Special Teams coordinator/running backs coach	2nd
David Lockwood	Safeties coach	2nd
Robert Nunn	Defensive line coach	3rd
Geep Wade	Offensive line coach	1st
Rod West	Cornerbacks coach	2nd
Brad Bielaniec	Director of athletic performance	3rd
