= Maurice Linguist =

American football player and coach (born 1984)

Current position
- Title: Co-defensive coordinator & defensive backs coach
- Team: Alabama
- Conference: SEC

Biographical details
- Born: April 1, 1984 (age 42); Dallas, Texas, U.S.

Playing career
- 2003–2006: Baylor
- Position: Safety

Coaching career (HC unless noted)

Football
- 2007: Baylor (GA)
- 2008: Valdosta State (DB/ST)
- 2009–2011: James Madison (S)
- 2012–2013: Buffalo (DB)
- 2014–2015: Iowa State (DB)
- 2016: Mississippi State (S)
- 2017: Minnesota (DB)
- 2018–2019: Texas A&M (CB)
- 2020: Dallas Cowboys (DB)
- 2021–2023: Buffalo
- 2024–present: Alabama (co-DC/DB)

Head coaching record
- Overall: 14–23
- Bowls: 1–0

Maurice M. Linguist (born April 1, 1984) is an American football coach. He is the co-defensive coordinator and defensive backs coach for the University of Alabama, a position he has held since 2024. He was the head coach for the University at Buffalo from 2021 until his departure in 2024 to join the Alabama coaching staff.

== Playing career ==
A native of Mesquite, Texas, Linguist played at Mesquite High School for the 2001 state champion Mesquite Skeeters and college football as a defensive back for Baylor. As a senior, he was an honorable mention on the All-Big 12 Team. He received a bachelor's degree in communication and a master's degree in sports management at Baylor.

== Coaching career ==
=== Assistant coaching jobs ===
After playing at Baylor, Linguist spent a season as a graduate assistant with the Bears. The following year, he coached defensive backs and special teams at Valdosta State. From 2009 until 2011, he coached safeties at James Madison.

In 2012, he joined the coaching staff at Buffalo for the first time as a defensive backs coach. In 2013, he was the team's co-defensive coordinator as well as its recruiting coordinator.

In 2014, he was hired to coach the secondary at Iowa State. In 2016, he was hired as the safeties coach at Mississippi State. Linguist spent the 2017 season coaching defensive backs at Minnesota. Following the season, he was named an assistant head coach to P. J. Fleck. However, less than a month later, in January 2018, he left the Golden Gophers to join the coaching staff at Texas A&M.

After serving for two years as the cornerbacks coach at Texas A&M, Mike McCarthy hired him as the secondary coach of the Dallas Cowboys, his first job in the National Football League.

=== Buffalo ===
Following the 2020 NFL season, Linguist was hired as the co-defensive coordinator at the University of Michigan. However, on May 7, 2021, he was hired as the head coach at the University at Buffalo. Despite Buffalo's poor performance in 2021, Linguist's recruiting class for 2022 was described by Sports Illustrated as the second-best in the Mid-American Conference. In July 2022, he signed a one-year contract extension. In his second season as head coach, Linguist led the Bulls to a 6–6 record in the regular season, earning an invite to the 2022 Camellia Bowl. UB defeated Georgia Southern 23–21, earning their first and only bowl win under Linguist.

=== Alabama ===
On January 16, 2024, it was reported that Linguist had resigned as the head coach of the University at Buffalo Bulls in order to join the Alabama Crimson Tide coaching staff as Co-Defensive Coordinator and Defensive Back coach , which was confirmed by the University at Buffalo later the same day.

== Head coaching record ==
Year	Team	Overall	Conference	Standing	Bowl/playoffs
Buffalo Bulls (Mid-American Conference) (2021–2023)
2021	Buffalo	4–8	2–6	T–4th (East)	
2022	Buffalo	7–6	5–3	T–2nd (East)	W Camellia
2023	Buffalo	3–9	3–5	4th (East)	
Buffalo:		14–23	10–14		
Total:		14–23			
