= Camellia Bowl =

Camellia Bowl can refer to one of three college football bowl games:

- Camellia Bowl (1948), played in Lafayette, Louisiana
- Camellia Bowl (1961–1980), played in Sacramento, California
- Camellia Bowl (2014–2023), played in Montgomery, Alabama; renamed in 2024 as the Salute to Veterans Bowl

== See also ==
- Camellia (disambiguation)
