= Clay Helton =

American football player and coach (born 1972)

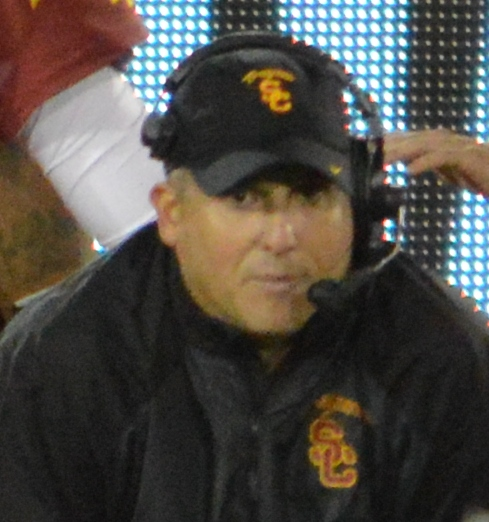
- Helton in 2013

Current position
- Title: Head coach
- Team: Georgia Southern
- Conference: Sun Belt
- Record: 34–29

Biographical details
- Born: June 24, 1972 (age 54); Gainesville, Florida, U.S.

Playing career
- 1990–1992: Auburn
- 1993–1994: Houston
- Position: Quarterback

Coaching career (HC unless noted)
- 1995: Duke (GA)
- 1996: Duke (RB)
- 1997–1999: Houston (RB)
- 2000–2002: Memphis (RB)
- 2003–2006: Memphis (WR)
- 2007–2009: Memphis (OC/QB)
- 2010–2011: USC (QB)
- 2012: USC (PGC/QB)
- 2013: USC (OC/QB)
- 2013: USC (interim HC)
- 2014: USC (OC/QB)
- 2015: USC (OC/QB/interim HC)
- 2015–2021: USC
- 2022–present: Georgia Southern

Head coaching record
- Overall: 80–53
- Bowls: 3–6

Accomplishments and honors

Championships
- 1 Pac-12 (2017); 3 Pac-12 South Division (2015, 2017, 2020)

Clay Charles Helton (born June 24, 1972) is an American college football coach and former player, who is currently the head coach at Georgia Southern University. He was previously the head coach at the University of Southern California from 2015 to 2021. Helton has also been an assistant coach for Duke, Houston and Memphis. His father, Kim Helton, was a coach in college, the National Football League, and the Canadian Football League; his brother, Tyson, is the head coach at Western Kentucky.

== Early life ==
Helton was born on June 24, 1972, in Gainesville, Florida, where his father Kim Helton was a graduate assistant for the Florida Gators football team. The Helton family later lived in the Miami, Tampa Bay, and Houston areas, as Kim Helton later coached for the University of Miami, Tampa Bay Buccaneers, and Houston Oilers. Clay Helton attended Clements High School in Sugar Land, Texas and graduated in 1990.

== College playing career ==
After redshirting his freshman year, Helton played college football at Auburn as quarterback. In 1993, Helton transferred to Houston, after his father was hired as head coach there. Helton was a backup quarterback at both Auburn and Houston and graduated from Houston in 1994 with a degree in mathematics and interdisciplinary science. At Houston, Helton completed 47 of 87 passes for 420 yards, one touchdown, and four interceptions and played 16 games.

== Coaching career ==
In 1995, Helton enrolled at Duke University and became a graduate assistant for the Duke Blue Devils football team under Fred Goldsmith. Helton later was promoted as running backs coach in 1996.

Helton joined his father at Houston to be running backs coach in 1997 and remained in that position until 1999, Kim Helton's final season as head coach.

After leaving Houston, Helton joined Rip Scherer's staff at Memphis also as running backs coach. Helton stayed on staff under new coach Tommy West, who replaced Scherer in 2001, and moved to coaching the wide receivers in 2003. By 2007, Helton was promoted to offensive coordinator and quarterbacks coach. Players Helton coached at Memphis include DeAngelo Williams, a first-round NFL draft pick in 2005, and 2006 Conference USA All-Freshman pick Duke Calhoun.

=== USC ===
Helton was hired by USC to be quarterbacks coach in 2010 under Lane Kiffin. In 2013, he was promoted to offensive coordinator. Helton served as the team's interim head coach during their bowl game after their previous interim head coach, Ed Orgeron, resigned following the hiring of Steve Sarkisian. On October 11, 2015, he once again became the interim head coach of the Trojans after head coach Steve Sarkisian took a leave of absence, and was then subsequently fired. On November 30, 2015, USC removed the interim tag and formally named Helton the 23rd head coach in school history. After Helton was named the permanent head coach, USC lost its final two games of the 2015 season to Stanford in the Pac-12 championship game and Wisconsin in the Holiday Bowl. In Helton's first full season as head coach, USC started off 1–3 with losses to Alabama, Stanford, and Utah, but then won its final eight games of the 2016 regular season as well as the Rose Bowl against Penn State to end the season with a record of 10–3 and third place in the AP poll.

In Helton's last full season as head coach, the season was shortened due to the COVID-19 pandemic. USC ended with a 5–1 record, with the only loss to Oregon in the Pac-12 championship game.

On September 13, 2021, Helton was relieved of his duties at USC after a loss to Stanford. His buyout was in the $12 million range. Including two stints as the interim head coach, Helton's record was 46-24 as the Trojans' coach, including a Rose Bowl win to cap the 2016 season. USC went 1-1 under Helton in the 2021–22 season.

=== Georgia Southern ===
On November 2, 2021, Helton was announced as the 11th head coach for Georgia Southern, replacing interim head coach Kevin Whitley.

== Head coaching record ==
Year	Team	Overall	Conference	Standing	Bowl/playoffs	Coaches^{#}	AP^{°}
USC Trojans (Pac-12 Conference) (2013)
2013	USC	1–0 (Note: Lane Kiffin was the head coach for the first five games of the season. Interim head coach Ed Orgeron coached the next eight games, but resigned after Steve Sarkisian was hired to become head coach of USC beginning in 2014. Helton was named interim head coach and coached USC in the 2013 Las Vegas Bowl.)	0–0		W Las Vegas	19	19
USC Trojans (Pac-12 Conference) (2015–2021)
2015	USC	5–4 (Note: Steve Sarkisian was the head coach for the first five games of the season. On October 11, 2015, Helton was named interim head coach after Sarkisian took an indefinite leave of absence and was fired a day later. On November 30, 2015, USC removed the interim tag and promoted Helton to permanent head coach.)	5–2	T–1st (South)	L Holiday		
2016	USC	10–3	7–2	2nd (South)	W Rose^{†}	5	3
2017	USC	11–3	8–1	1st (South)	L Cotton^{†}	10	12
2018	USC	5–7	4–5	T–3rd (South)			
2019	USC	8–5	7–2	2nd (South)	L Holiday		
2020	USC	5–1	5–0	1st (South)		21	21
2021	USC	1–1 (Note: Helton was relieved of his head coaching duties following a loss to rival Stanford.)	0–1	(South)			
USC:		46–24	36–13				
Georgia Southern Eagles (Sun Belt Conference) (2022–present)
2022	Georgia Southern	6–7	3–5	T–4th (East)	L Camellia		
2023	Georgia Southern	6–7	3–5	T–5th (East)	L Myrtle Beach		
2024	Georgia Southern	8–5	6–2	2nd (East)	L New Orleans		
2025	Georgia Southern	7–6	4–4	4th (East)	W Birmingham		
2026	Georgia Southern	7–4	6–1				
Georgia Southern:		34–29	22–17				
Total:		80–53					
National championship Conference title Conference division title or championship game berth
^{†}Indicates CFP / New Years' Six bowl.; ^{#}Rankings from final Coaches Poll.; ^{°}Rankings from final AP Poll.

== Personal life ==
Helton and his wife, Angela, have two sons, Reid and Turner and one daughter, Aubrey. Turner is currently a QB for Georgia Southern, and previously played for Western Kentucky. His brother Tyson Helton is the head coach at Western Kentucky. Their father is former coach Kim Helton.
