= 2022 Buffalo Bulls football team =

American college football season

2022 Buffalo Bulls football

Camellia Bowl champion

Camellia Bowl, W 23–21 vs. Georgia Southern
- Conference: Mid-American Conference
- East Division
- Record: 7–6 (5–3 MAC)
- Head coach: Maurice Linguist (2nd season)
- Offensive coordinator: Shane Montgomery (2nd season)
- Offensive scheme: Spread
- Defensive coordinator: Brandon Bailey (1st season)
- Base defense: 4–2–5
- Captain: Game captains
- Home stadium: University at Buffalo Stadium

2022 Mid-American Conference football standings
| | Conf. | | | Overall |
| Team | W | | L | W | | L |
|---|---|---|---|---|---|---|
East Division
| Ohio xy | 7 | – | 1 | 10 | – | 4 |
| Buffalo | 5 | – | 3 | 7 | – | 6 |
| Bowling Green | 5 | – | 3 | 6 | – | 7 |
| Miami (OH) | 4 | – | 4 | 6 | – | 7 |
| Kent State | 4 | – | 4 | 5 | – | 7 |
| Akron | 1 | – | 7 | 2 | – | 10 |
West Division
| Toledo xy$ | 5 | – | 3 | 9 | – | 5 |
| Eastern Michigan x | 5 | – | 3 | 9 | – | 4 |
| Western Michigan | 4 | – | 4 | 5 | – | 7 |
| Ball State | 3 | – | 5 | 5 | – | 7 |
| Central Michigan | 3 | – | 5 | 4 | – | 8 |
| Northern Illinois | 2 | – | 6 | 3 | – | 9 |
Championship: Toledo 17, Ohio 7
$ – Conference champion; x – Division champion/co-champions; y – Championship game participant; Rankings from AP Poll

The 2022 Buffalo Bulls football team represented the University at Buffalo as a member of the Mid-American Conference (MAC) during the 2022 NCAA Division I FBS football season. Led by second-year head coach Maurice Linguist, the Bulls compiled an overall record of 7–6 with a mark of 5–3 in conference play, tying for second place in the MAC's East Division. Buffalo was invited to the Camellia Bowl, where the Bulls defeated Georgia Southern. The team played home games at University at Buffalo Stadium in Amherst, New York.

== Schedule ==
| Date | Time | Opponent | Site | TV | Result | Attendance |
|---|---|---|---|---|---|---|
| September 3 | 12:00 p.m. | at Maryland* | Maryland Stadium; College Park, MD | BTN | L 10–31 | 30,223 |
| September 10 | 6:00 p.m. | No. 15 (FCS) Holy Cross* | University at Buffalo Stadium; Amherst, NY | ESPN+ | L 31–37 | 16,933 |
| September 17 | 1:00 p.m. | at Coastal Carolina* | Brooks Stadium; Conway, SC | ESPN+ | L 26–38 | 13,372 |
| September 24 | 12:00 p.m. | at Eastern Michigan | Rynearson Stadium; Ypsilanti, MI | CBSSN | W 50–31 | 14,524 |
| October 1 | 3:30 p.m. | Miami (OH)^{†} | University at Buffalo Stadium; Amherst, NY | ESPNU | W 24–21 | 18,615 |
| October 8 | 12:00 p.m. | at Bowling Green | Doyt Perry Stadium; Bowling Green, OH | ESPN+ | W 38–7 | 8,724 |
| October 15 | 1:00 p.m. | at UMass* | Warren McGuirk Alumni Stadium; Hadley, MA (rivalry) | ESPN3 | W 34–7 | 13,378 |
| October 22 | 1:00 p.m. | Toledo | University at Buffalo Stadium; Amherst, NY | ESPN+ | W 34–27 | 14,190 |
| November 1 | 7:30 p.m. | at Ohio | Peden Stadium; Athens, OH | ESPN2 | L 24–45 | 16,401 |
| November 9 | 7:00 p.m. | at Central Michigan | Kelly/Shorts Stadium; Mount Pleasant, MI | ESPN2 | L 27–31 | 9,103 |
| November 26 | 1:00 p.m. | Kent State | University at Buffalo Stadium; Amherst, NY | ESPN+ | L 27–30 ^{OT} | 12,302 |
| December 2 | 1:00 p.m. | Akron | University at Buffalo Stadium; Amherst, NY | ESPN+ | W 23–22 | 12,247 |
| December 27 | 12:00 p.m. | vs. Georgia Southern* | Cramton Bowl; Montgomery, AL (Camellia Bowl) | ESPN | W 23–21 | 15,322 |
*Non-conference game; ^{†}Homecoming; Rankings from AP Poll released prior to the game; All times are in Eastern time

== Game summaries ==
=== At Maryland ===
Buffalo Bulls (0–0) at Maryland Terrapins (0–0) - Game summary

| Quarter | 1 | 2 | 3 | 4 | Total |
|---|---|---|---|---|---|
| Bulls | 0 | 7 | 0 | 3 | 10 |
| Terrapins | 7 | 10 | 7 | 7 | 31 |

at Maryland Stadium • College Park, MD

- Date: September 3
- Game time: 12:00 p.m. EST
- Game weather: Sunny
- Game attendance: 30,223
- Referee: Jerry McGinn
- TV: B1G Network
- Box score

Game information

First quarter

- 12:24 MD - Roman Hemby 33-yard run (Chad Ryland kick) - 7-0 Maryland, Drive: 5 plays, 78 yards, 1:33

Second quarter

- 12:14 MD - Antwain Littleton II 2-yard run (Chad Ryland kick) - 14-0 Maryland, Drive: 3 plays, 31 yards, 1:06
- 6:30 MD - Chad Ryland 45-yard field goal - 17-0 Maryland, Drive: 6 plays, 54 yards, 2:38
- 3:03 BUF - Al-Jay Henderson 19-yard run (Alex McNulty kick) - 17-7 Maryland, Drive: 9 plays, 75 yards, 3:27

Third quarter

- 14:21 MD - Roman Hemby 70-yard run (Chad Ryland kick) - 24-7 Maryland, Drive: 2 plays, 75 yards, 0:39

Fourth quarter

- 13:49 MD - Antwain Littleton II 1-yard run (Chad Ryland kick) - 31-7 Maryland, Drive: 11 plays, 79 yards, 4:17
- 6:07 BUF - Alex McNulty 34-yard field goal - 31-10 Maryland, Drive: 11 plays, 80 yards, 4:12

| Statistics | Buffalo | Maryland |
|---|---|---|
| First downs | 18 | 16 |
| Plays–yards | 73–268 | 61–446 |
| Rushes–yards | 38–108 | 26–149 |
| Passing yards | 160 | 297 |
| Passing: comp–att–int | 18–35–0 | 25–35–1 |
| Turnovers | | |
| Time of possession | 32:37 | 27:23 |

| Team | Category | Player | Statistics |
|---|---|---|---|
| Buffalo | Passing | Cole Snyder | 18/35, 160 yards |
| Buffalo | Rushing | Ron Cook | 15 carries, 33 yards |
| Buffalo | Receiving | Justin Marshall | 4 receptions, 52 yards |
| Maryland | Passing | Taulia Tagovailoa | 24/34, 290 yards, 1 INT |
| Maryland | Rushing | Roman Hemby | 7 carries, 114 yards, 2 TD |
| Maryland | Receiving | Rakim Jarrett | 6 receptions, 110 yards |

=== No. 15 (FCS) Holy Cross ===
| | 1 | 2 | 3 | 4 | Total |
|---|---|---|---|---|---|
| No. 15 (FCS) Crusaders | 0 | 14 | 14 | 9 | 37 |
| Bulls | 7 | 14 | 7 | 3 | 31 |

=== At Coastal Carolina ===
| | 1 | 2 | 3 | 4 | Total |
|---|---|---|---|---|---|
| Bulls | 6 | 10 | 3 | 7 | 26 |
| Chanticleers | 7 | 7 | 3 | 21 | 38 |

=== At Eastern Michigan ===
| | 1 | 2 | 3 | 4 | Total |
|---|---|---|---|---|---|
| Bulls | 13 | 17 | 10 | 10 | 50 |
| Eagles | 14 | 10 | 7 | 0 | 31 |

=== Miami (OH) ===
| | 1 | 2 | 3 | 4 | Total |
|---|---|---|---|---|---|
| RedHawks | 7 | 3 | 10 | 0 | 20 |
| Bulls | 7 | 7 | 3 | 7 | 24 |

=== At Bowling Green ===
| | 1 | 2 | 3 | 4 | Total |
|---|---|---|---|---|---|
| Bulls | 17 | 14 | 7 | 0 | 38 |
| Falcons | 0 | 0 | 7 | 0 | 7 |

=== At UMass ===
| | 1 | 2 | 3 | 4 | Total |
|---|---|---|---|---|---|
| Bulls | 3 | 21 | 3 | 7 | 34 |
| Minutemen | 0 | 7 | 0 | 0 | 7 |

=== Toledo ===
| | 1 | 2 | 3 | 4 | Total |
|---|---|---|---|---|---|
| Rockets | 7 | 13 | 7 | 0 | 27 |
| Bulls | 0 | 7 | 3 | 24 | 34 |

=== At Ohio ===
Buffalo Bulls (4–3, 4–0) vs. Ohio Bobcats (5–3, 3–1)

| Quarter | 1 | 2 | 3 | 4 | Total |
|---|---|---|---|---|---|
| Buffalo | 0 | 10 | 14 | 0 | 24 |
| Ohio | 17 | 7 | 7 | 14 | 45 |

at Peden Stadium • Athens, OH

- Date: Tuesday, November 1, 2022
- Game time: 7:30 p.m. EDT
- Game weather: • Cloudy, Temperature: 57 °F (14 °C)
- Game attendance: 16,401
- Referee: William Williams
- TV announcers (ESPN2): Mike Corey, Tom Luginbill, Taylor McGregor
- box score

Game information

First Quarter

- (11:22) OHIO – Wiglusz, Sam 16 yd pass from Rourke, Kurtis (Vakos, Nathanial kick) 5 plays, 70 yards, TOP 01:57 (OHIO 7–0)
- (06:01) OHIO – Vakos, Nathanial 37 yd field goal 8 plays, 45 yards, TOP 03:18 (OHIO 10–0)
- (01:38) OHIO – Jones, Jacoby 5 yd pass from Rourke, Kurtis (Vakos, Nathanial kick) 5 plays, 42 yards, TOP 02:49 (OHIO 17–0)

Second Quarter

- (12:05) UB – McNulty, Alex 28 yd field goal 10 plays, 65 yards, TOP 04:33 (OHIO 17–3)
- (04:03) OHIO – Wiglusz, Sam 5 yd pass from Rourke, Kurtis (Vakos, Nathanial kick) 5 plays, 62 yards, TOP 02:54 (OHIO 24–3)
- (00:20) UB – Marshall, Justin 12 yd pass from Snyder, Cole (McNulty, Alex kick) 8 plays, 35 yards, TOP 01:12 (OHIO 24–10)

Third Quarter

- (14:00) UB – Cobb, Keyshawn 26 Yd Interception Return (McNulty, Alex kick) 3 plays, 6 yards, TOP 00:55 (OHIO 24–17)
- (10:05) OHIO – Cross, Miles 2 yd pass from Rourke, Kurtis (Vakos, Nathanial kick) 8 plays, 75 yards, TOP 03:55 (OHIO 31–17)
- (01:46) UB – Washington, Mike 2 yd pass from Snyder, Cole (McNulty, Alex kick) 14 plays, 56 yards, TOP 06:53 (OHIO 31–24)

Fourth Quarter

- (13:16) OHIO – Neatherton, Jake 1 yd run (Vakos, Nathanial kick) 7 plays, 80 yards, TOP 03:24 (OHIO 38–24)
- (12:10) OHIO – Cross, Miles 9 yd pass from Rourke, Kurtis (Vakos, Nathanial kick) 2 plays, 12 yards, TOP 00:51 (OHIO 45–24)

| Statistics | UB | OHIO |
|---|---|---|
| First downs | 17 | 20 |
| Total yards | 260 | 474 |
| Rushes/yards | 22 | 157 |
| Passing yards | 238 | 317 |
| Passing: Comp–Att–Int | 25–49–1 | 20–29–1 |
| Time of possession | 29:46 | 30:14 |

| Team | Category | Player | Statistics |
|---|---|---|---|
| Buffalo | Passing | Cole Snyder | 25/49, 238 yards, 2 TD, 1 INT |
| Buffalo | Rushing | Mike Washington | 6 carries, 19 yards |
| Buffalo | Receiving | Justin Marshall | 6 receptions, 72 yards, 1 TD |
| Ohio | Passing | Kurtis Rourke | 20/29, 317 yards, 5 TD, 1 INT |
| Ohio | Rushing | Jake Neatherton | 13 carries, 68 yards, 1 TD |
| Ohio | Receiving | Sam Wiglusz | 6 receptions, 131 yards, 2 TD |

=== At Central Michigan ===
| | 1 | 2 | 3 | 4 | Total |
|---|---|---|---|---|---|
| Bulls | 7 | 17 | 0 | 3 | 27 |
| Chippewas | 7 | 0 | 17 | 7 | 31 |

=== Kent State ===
| | 1 | 2 | 3 | 4 | OT | Total |
|---|---|---|---|---|---|---|
| Golden Flashes | 3 | 7 | 0 | 14 | 6 | 30 |
| Bulls | 3 | 7 | 14 | 0 | 3 | 27 |

=== Akron ===
| | 1 | 2 | 3 | 4 | Total |
|---|---|---|---|---|---|
| Zips | 9 | 7 | 0 | 6 | 22 |
| Bulls | 0 | 10 | 7 | 6 | 23 |

=== Vs. Georgia Southern—Camellia Bowl ===
| | 1 | 2 | 3 | 4 | Total |
|---|---|---|---|---|---|
| Eagles | 0 | 6 | 8 | 7 | 21 |
| Bulls | 0 | 14 | 6 | 3 | 23 |
