= 2022 Georgia Southern Eagles football team =

American college football season

2022 Georgia Southern Eagles football

Camellia Bowl, L 21–23 vs. Buffalo
- Conference: Sun Belt Conference
- East Division
- Record: 6–7 (3–5 Sun Belt)
- Head coach: Clay Helton (1st season)
- Offensive coordinator: Bryan Ellis (1st season)
- Offensive scheme: Multiple
- Defensive coordinator: Will Harris (1st season)
- Base defense: 4–2–5
- Home stadium: Paulson Stadium

2022 Sun Belt Conference football standings
	Conf.			Overall
Team	W		L	W		L
East Division
James Madison* x	6	–	2	8	–	3
Coastal Carolina xy	6	–	2	9	–	4
Marshall	5	–	3	9	–	4
Georgia Southern	3	–	5	6	–	7
Appalachian State	3	–	5	6	–	6
Georgia State	3	–	5	4	–	8
Old Dominion	2	–	6	3	–	9
West Division
No. 19 Troy xy$	7	–	1	12	–	2
South Alabama x	7	–	1	10	–	3
Southern Miss	4	–	4	7	–	6
Louisiana	4	–	4	6	–	7
Louisiana–Monroe	3	–	5	4	–	8
Texas State	2	–	6	4	–	8
Arkansas State	1	–	7	3	–	9
Championship: Troy 45, Coastal Carolina 26
$ – Conference champion; x – Division champion/co-champions; y – Championship game participant; * – Ineligible for postseason play due to FCS-to-FBS transition rules; Rankings from AP Poll

The 2022 Georgia Southern Eagles football team represented Georgia Southern University during the 2022 NCAA Division I FBS football season. The Eagles played their home games at Paulson Stadium in Statesboro, Georgia, and competed in the East Division of the Sun Belt Conference. The team was coached by Clay Helton, former head coach of the USC Trojans. Helton was hired on November 2, 2021, and this was his first season in Statesboro.

The team's statistical leaders include quarterback Kyle Vantrease.

== Preseason ==
=== Recruiting class ===
College recruiting
Name	Hometown	School	Height	Weight	40^{‡}	Commit date
Ben Anderson; LS	Charlotte, NC	Charlotte Latin School	6 ft 4 in (1.93 m)	235 lb (107 kg)	–	Jan 9, 2022
Ben Anderson; LS	Recruit ratings: ESPN: (69)					
Ezrah Archie; WR	Sicklerville, NJ	Timber Creek HS; Monmouth	6 ft 1 in (1.85 m)	185 lb (84 kg)	–	
Ezrah Archie; WR	Recruit ratings: No ratings found					
Omari Arnold; RB	Quitman, GA	Brooks County HS	5 ft 9 in (1.75 m)	175 lb (79 kg)	–	
Omari Arnold; RB	Recruit ratings: ESPN: (74)					
Henry Bates; K	Waycross, GA	Ware County HS	5 ft 11 in (1.80 m)	175 lb (79 kg)	–	Jan 9, 2022
Henry Bates; K	Recruit ratings: ESPN: (72)					
Latrell Bullard; DL	Kennesaw, GA	North Cobb HS	6 ft 2 in (1.88 m)	315 lb (143 kg)	–	
Latrell Bullard; DL	Recruit ratings: No ratings found					
Dalen Cobb; ATH	Washington, GA	Washington-Wilkes HS	5 ft 11 in (1.80 m)	185 lb (84 kg)	–	
Dalen Cobb; ATH	Recruit ratings: ESPN: (74)					
Danny Corbett; IOL	Lake Park, GA	Lowndes HS; Campbell	6 ft 4 in (1.93 m)	290 lb (130 kg)	–	
Danny Corbett; IOL	Recruit ratings: No ratings found					
David Dallas; QB	Sharpsburg, GA	Trinity Christian School	6 ft 0 in (1.83 m)	188 lb (85 kg)	–	
David Dallas; QB	Recruit ratings: 247Sports: ESPN: (73)					
Josh Dallas; ATH	Sharpsburg, GA	Trinity Christian School	6 ft 1 in (1.85 m)	208 lb (94 kg)	–	
Josh Dallas; ATH	Recruit ratings: 247Sports: ESPN: (73)					
Da'Shawn Davis; DL	Cornelius, NC	Hough HS	6 ft 2 in (1.88 m)	268 lb (122 kg)	–	
Da'Shawn Davis; DL	Recruit ratings: 247Sports: ESPN: (76)					
Elhadj Fall; DL	Marietta, GA	Osborne HS	6 ft 4 in (1.93 m)	250 lb (110 kg)	–	
Elhadj Fall; DL	Recruit ratings: ESPN: (73)					
Colton Fitzgerald; QB	Santa Clarita, CA	Saugus HS; Boise State	6 ft 2 in (1.88 m)	195 lb (88 kg)	–	
Colton Fitzgerald; QB	Recruit ratings: No ratings found					
Wylan Free; CB	Compton, CA	Lynwood HS; Fresno State	6 ft 2 in (1.88 m)	172 lb (78 kg)	–	
Wylan Free; CB	Recruit ratings: No ratings found					
Terrance Gibbs; RB	Winter Park, FL	Winter Park HS	6 ft 0 in (1.83 m)	190 lb (86 kg)	–	Feb 2, 2022
Terrance Gibbs; RB	Recruit ratings: 247Sports: ESPN: (83)					
Jacob Hammonds; LB	Griffin, GA	Griffin HS	6 ft 2 in (1.88 m)	210 lb (95 kg)	–	
Jacob Hammonds; LB	Recruit ratings: 247Sports: ESPN: (71)					
Zyere Horton; S	Alpharetta, GA	Milton HS	6 ft 3 in (1.91 m)	205 lb (93 kg)	–	
Zyere Horton; S	Recruit ratings: ESPN: (72)					
Ethan Ingram; IOL	Gainesville, FL	Buchholz HS; Marshall	6 ft 4 in (1.93 m)	280 lb (130 kg)	–	
Ethan Ingram; IOL	Recruit ratings: No ratings found					
Treston Jordan; S	Alpharetta, GA	Denmark HS	6 ft 0 in (1.83 m)	195 lb (88 kg)	–	
Treston Jordan; S	Recruit ratings: ESPN: (72)					
Michael Lantz; K	Peachtree City, GA	Starr's Mill HS; Minnesota	6 ft 0 in (1.83 m)	178 lb (81 kg)	–	
Michael Lantz; K	Recruit ratings: No ratings found					
Nate Lewis; IOL	Hazlehurst, GA	Jeff Davis HS	6 ft 3 in (1.91 m)	265 lb (120 kg)	–	
Nate Lewis; IOL	Recruit ratings: ESPN: (76)					
Zak Rozsman; QB	Marietta, GA	Walton HS	6 ft 2.5 in (1.89 m)	200 lb (91 kg)	–	
Zak Rozsman; QB	Recruit ratings: 247Sports: ESPN: (78)					
Marcus Sanders; WR	Montezuma, GA	Macon County HS	6 ft 4 in (1.93 m)	290 lb (130 kg)	–	
Marcus Sanders; WR	Recruit ratings: ESPN: (73)					
Jeremy Singleton; WR	New Orleans, LA	Brother Martin High School; Houston	6 ft 0 in (1.83 m)	170 lb (77 kg)	–	
Jeremy Singleton; WR	Recruit ratings: 247Sports:					
Kevin Speed; ATH	Cairo, GA	Cairo HS	6 ft 2 in (1.88 m)	197 lb (89 kg)	–	
Kevin Speed; ATH	Recruit ratings: ESPN: (74)					
Marc Stampley; S	Peachtree City, GA	Starr's Mill HS	5 ft 11 in (1.80 m)	170 lb (77 kg)	–	
Marc Stampley; S	Recruit ratings: 247Sports: ESPN: (70)					
Chandler Strong; IOL	Warner Robins, GA	Houston County HS	6 ft 3 in (1.91 m)	280 lb (130 kg)	–	
Chandler Strong; IOL	Recruit ratings: ESPN: (72)					
MJ Stroud; EDGE	Covington, GA	Alcovy HS	6 ft 3 in (1.91 m)	230 lb (100 kg)	–	
MJ Stroud; EDGE	Recruit ratings: 247Sports: ESPN: (74)					
Ky Tayo; DL	Columbia, SC	Spring Valley HS	6 ft 0 in (1.83 m)	280 lb (130 kg)	–	
Ky Tayo; DL	Recruit ratings: ESPN: (69)					
Joshua Thompson; WR	Alpharetta, GA	Johns Creek HS	5 ft 11 in (1.80 m)	175 lb (79 kg)	–	
Joshua Thompson; WR	Recruit ratings: ESPN: (72)					
Kyle Toole; QB	Leesburg, GA	Lee County HS; Troy	6 ft 2 in (1.88 m)	201 lb (91 kg)	–	
Kyle Toole; QB	Recruit ratings: No ratings found					
Kyle Vantrease; QB	Stow, OH	Stow-Munroe HS; Buffalo	6 ft 3 in (1.91 m)	230 lb (100 kg)	–	
Kyle Vantrease; QB	Recruit ratings: No ratings found					
Kristian Varner; DL	Hiram, GA	Hiram HS; North Carolina	6 ft 4 in (1.93 m)	300 lb (140 kg)	–	
Kristian Varner; DL	Recruit ratings: 247Sports:					
Ashton Whitner; S	Greenville, SC	Greenville HS	6 ft 1 in (1.85 m)	190 lb (86 kg)	–	
Ashton Whitner; S	Recruit ratings: 247Sports: ESPN: (73)					
Pichon Wimbley; IOL	Newnan, GA	Newnan HS	6 ft 2 in (1.88 m)	305 lb (138 kg)	–	
Pichon Wimbley; IOL	Recruit ratings: 247Sports: ESPN: (69)					
Mari Wingard; CB	Charlotte, NC	Ardrey Kell HS; Elon	6 ft 1 in (1.85 m)	172 lb (78 kg)	–	
Mari Wingard; CB	Recruit ratings: No ratings found					

=== Media poll ===
The Sun Belt media days were held on July 25 and July 26. The Eagles were predicted to finish in fifth place in the Sun Belt's East Division. Georgia Southern also received 1-of-14 first place votes.

=== Sun Belt Preseason All-Conference teams ===
Defense

2nd team

- Justin ellis – Defensive Lineman, 6th YR
- Derrick canteen – Defensive Back, RS-JR

Special teams

2nd team

- Anthony beck ii – Punter, RS-SR
- Amare jones – All Purpose Back, 5th YR

== Personnel ==
2022 Georgia Southern Eagles football team roster
Players
Coaches
Offense

Pos.	#	Name	Class
WR	1	Jeremy Singleton	Sr
WR	2	Derwin Burgess Jr.	So
RB	4	Gerald Green	Jr
WR	5	Amare Jones	Sr
QB	6	Kyle Vantrease	Sr
WR	7	Khaleb Hood	Sr
TE	9	Jjay Mcafee	Sr
WR	10	Darius Lewis	Jr
TE	11	Beau Johnson	Jr
QB	12	David Dallas	Fr
QB	13	Connor Cigelske	So
WR	14	Sam Kenerson	So
QB	15	Zak Rozsman	Fr
QB	16	Colton FitzGerald	Fr
QB	17	Richie Lankford	So
WR	17	TJ Lewis	Fr
WR	18	Josh Dallas	Fr
QB	19	Kyle Toole	So
RB	20	Terrance Gibbs	Fr
WR	21	Marcus Sanders Jr.	Fr
RB	22	OJ Arnold	Fr
RB	23	Tyler Jordan	Jr
WR	24	Joshua Thompson	Fr
RB	25	Jalen White	Jr
WR	26	Dalen Cobb	Fr
TE	27	Ethan Dirrim	Jr
WR	28	Ezrah Archie	GS
RB	29	AJ Brown	Jr
WR	30	Alex Bowen	So
QB	31	Brooks Pangle	Fr
RB	33	Robert Edwards III	Fr
RB	35	Terron Dixon II	Jr
WR	36	Justin Howell	Jr
RB	47	Jordan Pearson	Jr
TE	48	Dylan Snyder	Fr
OL	50	Caleb Kelly	GS
OL	54	Ethan Ingram	Fr
OL	55	Danny Corbett	GS
OL	56	Brian Miller	GS
OL	57	Chandler Strong	Fr
OL	58	Aaron Pyron	Jr
OL	60	Rasheed Miller	So
OL	62	Michael Jubran	Jr
OL	63	Teva Reynolds	Jr
OL	64	Caelan Williams	So
OL	65	Vontrez Jackson	Fr
OL	66	Logan Langemeier	GS
OL	67	Cameron Orr	GS
OL	68	Nate Lewis	Fr
OL	72	Khalil Crowder	Sr
OL	73	Chas Collins	Fr
OL	74	Pichon Wimbley	Fr
OL	75	Korbett MacGregor	Fr
OL	77	Griffin Carder	Jr
OL	78	Caleb Cook	Fr
WR	80	Jeb Beshears	Fr
WR	81	Parker Self	So
WR	82	JT Galloway	Sr
TE	83	Chase Hancock	Sr
TE	84	Braxton Slack	Fr
WR	85	Emil Smith	Jr
WR	86	Graeme Williams	Fr
TE	87	Evan Lester Jr.	Fr
WR	88	Lawson Bachelder	Jr
WR	89	Matthew Daniel	Jr

Defense

Pos.	#	Name	Class
LB	1	Todd Bradley-Glenn	Sr
DL	2	Justin Ellis	Sr
DB	4	Tyler Bride	Jr
DB	5	Wylan Free	Sr
DB	6	NaJee Thompson	Sr
LB	9	Khadry Jackson	Sr
DB	10	Jalen Denton	So
LB	11	Kevon Glenn	Jr
DB	12	Anthony Wilson	Jr
DB	13	Derrick Canteen	Jr
DB	14	Ashton Whitner	Fr
DL	15	Quin Williams	Sr
DB	16	Tyrell Davis	So
DB	17	Myzel Williams	So
DB	18	Justin Birdsong	GS
DB	20	Seth Robertson	Jr
LB	21	Zyon McGee	Sr
DB	22	Marc Stampley II	Fr
DB	23	Mari Wingard	GS
DB	24	Jailen Barber	Fr
DB	25	Quincy Bonner	Fr
DB	26	Justin Nelson	Jr
DL	27	Isaac Walker	Fr
LB	28	Zyere Horton	Fr
DB	29	Justin Meyers	Fr
DB	30	Jack Ferguson	So
DB	31	Chase Dial-Watson	So
DB	32	Kevin Speed	Fr
LB	33	Marques Watson-Trent	So
LB	34	Jon Ferguson	Sr
DB	35	Chandler Dial-Watson	So
DB	36	Treston Jordan	Fr
LB	37	Quincy Darnell	Jr
LB	39	Reid Dedman	Jr
LB	40	Jalen Jackson	Jr
DB	41	Tracy Hall Jr.	Fr
DL	42	Dillon Springer	GS
LB	43	Jacob Hammonds	Fr
LB	44	Jeffrey Smyth	Jr
LB	45	MJ Stroud	Fr
DB	46	Andrew Douglas	Fr
DB	47	Elijah Hynes	Fr
LB	48	Zack Blackwell	Fr
LB	49	Javian Boykin	Jr
DL	52	Brandon Wilson	Jr
DL	53	Trevon Locke	So
DL	55	Ky Tayo	Fr
DL	57	Latrell Bullard	Fr
DL	79	Kaylen Wright	Sr
DL	90	Parker Devine	Sr
DL	91	Davion Rhodes	Fr
DL	92	Kristian Varner	Jr
DL	93	Da'Shawn Davis	Fr
DL	94	Elhadj Fall	Fr
DL	95	Amaru Herring	Jr
DL	96	LJ McCloud	Fr
DL	97	Myles Winslow	Fr
DL	99	Kierron Smith	Jr

Special teams

Pos.	#	Name	Class
P	7	Anthony Beck II	Sr
K	19	Alex Raynor	Jr
LS	41	Nathan Tillman	Fr
K	82	Britton Williams	So
LS	90	Jackson Wheeler	Jr
LS	93	Gaines Wood	Fr
LS	95	Mark Langston	Jr
K	96	Chase Folser	Fr
K	97	Bryce Christensen	Sr
K	98	Michael Lantz	Jr
P	99	Walker Bradberry	Fr

Head coach

- Clay Helton (Houston)

Coordinators/assistant coaches

- Kevin Whitley (Georgia Southern)
  Cornerbacks
- Bryan Ellis (UAB)
  Offensive coordinator/quarterbacks
- Will Harris (USC)
  Defensive coordinator/secondary
- Ryan Aplin (Arkansas State)
  Tight ends/Inside receivers/Pass game coordinator
- Marcus Davis (Auburn)
  Wide receivers
- Matt Merritt (Capital)
  Running backs
- Richard Owens (Louisville)
  Offensive line/Run game coordinator
- Rip Rowan (Austin Peay)
  Defensive line
- Aaron Schwanz (UW–Oshkosh)
  Linebackers
- Turner West (Memphis)
  Special teams coordinator

Legend

- (C) Team captain
- (S) Suspended
- (I) Ineligible
- Injured
- Redshirt

Roster

== Schedule ==
All conference games were announced March 1, 2022.

Date	Time	Opponent	Site	TV	Result	Attendance
September 3	6:00 p.m.	Morgan State*	Paulson Stadium; Statesboro, GA	ESPN3	W 59–7	15,183
September 10	7:30 p.m.	at Nebraska*	Memorial Stadium; Lincoln, NE	FS1	W 45–42	86,862
September 17	3:30 p.m.	at UAB*	Protective Stadium; Birmingham, AL	Stadium	L 21–35	24,302
September 24	6:00 p.m.	Ball State*^{†}	Paulson Stadium; Statesboro, GA	ESPN+	W 34–23	18,434
October 1	7:00 p.m.	at Coastal Carolina	Brooks Stadium; Conway, SC	ESPN+	L 30–34	18,756
October 8	2:00 p.m.	at Georgia State	Center Parc Stadium; Atlanta, GA (Modern Day Hate)	ESPN3	L 33–41	20,109
October 15	4:00 p.m.	No. 25 James Madison	Paulson Stadium; Statesboro, GA	ESPN+	W 45–38	18,738
October 22	3:30 p.m.	at Old Dominion	S.B. Ballard Stadium; Norfolk, VA	ESPN+	W 28–23	20,162
November 5	4:00 p.m.	South Alabama	Paulson Stadium; Statesboro, GA	ESPN+	L 31–38	17,084
November 10	7:30 p.m.	at Louisiana	Cajun Field; Lafayette, LA	ESPN2	L 17–36	11,512
November 19	6:00 p.m.	Marshall	Paulson Stadium; Statesboro, GA	ESPN+	L 10–23	16,153
November 26	5:00 p.m.	Appalachian State	Paulson Stadium; Statesboro, GA (Deeper Than Hate)	ESPN+	W 51–48 ^{2OT}	18,683
December 27	12:00 p.m.	vs. Buffalo*	Cramton Bowl; Montgomery, AL (Camellia Bowl)	ESPN	L 21–23	15,322
*Non-conference game; ^{†}Homecoming; Rankings from Coaches' Poll released prior to the game

== Game summaries ==
=== Morgan State ===
	1	2	3	4	Total
Bears	0	7	0	0	7
Eagles	0	17	14	28	59

=== At Nebraska ===
Georgia Southern Eagles (1–0) vs Nebraska Cornhuskers (1–1) – Game summary

Quarter	1	2	3	4	Total
Eagles	14	14	7	10	45
Cornhuskers	7	21	7	7	42

at Memorial Stadium • Lincoln, NE

- Date: September 10, 2022
- Game time: 6:30 p.m.
- Game weather: Cloudy, 63 °F (17 °C)
- Game attendance: 86,862
- Referee: Jeffrey Servinski
- TV announcers (FS1): Noah Eagle (play-by-play), Mark Helfrich (analyst)

Game information

First quarter

- (8:02) GASO – Jalen White 2-yard run, Alex Raynor kick (Drive: 13 plays, 74 yards, 4:59; Georgia Southern 7–0)
- (4:17) NEB – Casey Thompson 8-yard run, Timmy Bleekrode kick (Drive: 9 plays, 75 yards, 3:45; Tied 7–7)
- (2:21) GASO – Jalen White 26-yard run, Alex Raynor kick (Drive: 8 plays, 75 yards, 1:56; Georgia Southern 14–7)

Second quarter

- (13:40) NEB – Brody Belt 21-yard pass from Casey Thompson, Timmy Bleekrode kick (Drive: 10 plays, 75 yards, 3:41; Tied 14–14)
- (8:25) NEB – Anthony Grant 4-yard run, Timmy Bleekrode kick (Drive: 10 plays, 76 yards, 4:33; Nebraska 21–14)
- (7:27) GASO – Gerald Green 1-yard run, Alex Raynor kick (Drive: 3 plays, 75 yards, 0:58; Tied 21–21)
- (4:00) GASO – Gerald Green 47-yard run, Alex Raynor kick (Drive: 5 plays, 80 yards, 1:54; Georgia Southern 28–21)
- (1:50) NEB – Casey Thompson 2-yard run, Timmy Bleekrode kick (Drive: 6 plays, 75 yards, 2:10; Tied 28–28)

Third quarter

- (12:12) GASO – Amare Jones 10-yard pass from Kyle Vantrease, Alex Raynor kick (Drive: 8 plays, 75 yards, 2:48; Georgia Southern 35–28)
- (3:18) NEB – Ajay Allen 7-yard run, Timmy Bleekrode kick (Drive: 13 plays, 84 yards, 4:59; Tied 35–35)

Fourth quarter

- (14:42) GASO – Alex Raynor 19-yard field goal (Drive: 10 plays, 77 yards, 3:29; Georgia Southern 38–35)
- (3:05) NEB – Casey Thompson 1-yard run, Timmy Bleekrode kick (Drive: 15 plays, 98 yards, 5:58; Nebraska 42–38)
- (0:36) GASO – Kyle Vantrease 8-yard run, Alex Raynor kick (Drive: 11 plays, 75 yards, 2:29; Georgia Southern 45–42)

Statistics	GASO	NEB
First downs	34	33
Total yards	642	575
Rushes/yards	30–233	47–257
Passing yards	409	318
Passing: Comp–Att–Int	37–56–2	23–34–0
Time of possession	28:04	31:56

Team	Category	Player	Statistics
Georgia Southern	Passing	Kyle Vantrease	37/56, 409 yards, TD, 2 INT
Georgia Southern	Rushing	Gerald Green	10 carries, 132 yards, 2 TD
Georgia Southern	Receiving	Derwin Burgess Jr.	12 receptions, 119 yards
Nebraska	Passing	Casey Thompson	23/34, 318 yards, TD
Nebraska	Rushing	Anthony Grant	27 carries, 138 yards, TD
Nebraska	Receiving	Marcus Washington	6 receptions, 123 yards

=== At UAB ===
	1	2	3	4	Total
Eagles	0	7	7	7	21
Blazers	7	14	0	14	35

Statistics	GASO	UAB
First downs	23	21
Total yards	418	413
Rushing yards	214	288
Passing yards	204	125
Turnovers	3	0
Time of possession	28:14	31:46

Team	Category	Player	Statistics
Georgia Southern	Passing	Kyle Vantrease	24/50, 204 yards, TD, 3 INT
Georgia Southern	Rushing	Jalen White	14 rushes, 116 yards, 2 TD
Georgia Southern	Receiving	Derwin Burgess Jr.	4 receptions, 48 yards, TD
UAB	Passing	Dylan Hopkins	12/19, 125 yards, TD
UAB	Rushing	DeWayne McBride	28 rushes, 223 yards, 4 TD
UAB	Receiving	Ryan Davis	1 reception, 36 yards

=== Ball State ===
	1	2	3	4	Total
Cardinals	3	7	10	3	23
Eagles	3	10	7	14	34

=== At Coastal Carolina ===
	1	2	3	4	Total
Eagles	0	7	10	13	30
Chanticleers	7	0	7	20	34

=== At Georgia State ===
	1	2	3	4	Total
Eagles	7	10	13	3	33
Panthers	13	14	7	7	41

=== No. 25 James Madison ===
	1	2	3	4	Total
No. 25 Dukes	7	10	7	14	38
Eagles	0	14	17	14	45

=== At Old Dominion ===
	1	2	3	4	Total
Eagles	7	7	7	7	28
Monarchs	3	0	13	7	23

Statistics

Statistics	GS	ODU
First downs	25	18
Total yards	415	446
Rushing yards	223	133
Passing yards	192	313
Turnovers	0	0
Time of possession	34:33	25:27

Team	Category	Player	Statistics
Georgia Southern	Passing	Kyle Vantrease	22/27, 192 yards, TD
Georgia Southern	Rushing	Jalen White	30 rushes, 138 yards, TD
Georgia Southern	Receiving	Amare Jones	5 receptions, 54 yards, TD
Old Dominion	Passing	Hayden Wolff	23/40, 313 yards, TD
Old Dominion	Rushing	Blake Watson	16 rushes, 108 yards, TD
Old Dominion	Receiving	Ali Jennings III	9 receptions, 130 yards, TD

=== South Alabama ===
	1	2	3	4	Total
Jaguars	7	10	7	14	38
Eagles	21	3	7	0	31

=== At Louisiana ===
Georgia Southern at Louisiana

Team	1	2	3	4	Total
Eagles	0	7	7	3	17
• Ragin' Cajuns	7	20	3	6	36

- Date: November 10, 2022
- Location: Cajun Field
  Lafayette, Louisiana
- Game start: 6:33 p.m. CDT
- Elapsed time: 3 hours and 32 minutes
- Game attendance: 11,512
- Game weather: 65 °F (18 °C) • Weather: Clear • Wind: NE 3 MPH
- Referee: Ted Pitts
- TV announcers (ESPN2): Mike Couzens (play–by–play) and Charles Arbuckle (analyst)

Scoring summary
1	10:52	LA	John Stephens Jr. 28-yard pass from Ben Wooldridge (Kenneth Almendares kick) (6 plays, 60 yards, 2:43)	LA 7–0
2	13:43	GASO	Derwin Burgess Jr. 32-yard pass from OJ Arnold (Alex Raynor kick) (8 plays, 96 yards, 3:32)	TIE 7–7
2	12:28	LA	Jacob Bernard 18-yard pass from Ben Wooldridge (Kenneth Almendares kick) (3 plays, 75 yards, 1:15)	LA 14–7
2	10:45	LA	Michael Jefferson 28-yard pass from Ben Wooldridge (Kenneth Almendares kick) (1 play, 28 yards, 0:09)	LA 21–7
2	03:34	LA	Kenneth Almendares 48-yard field goal (11 plays, 40 yards, 4:48)	LA 24–7
2	00:00	LA	Kenneth Almendares 34-yard field goal (7 plays, 33 yards, 0:33)	LA 27–7
3	10:01	LA	Kenneth Almendares 27-yard field goal (13 plays, 62 yards, 4:59)	LA 30–7
3	04:25	GASO	Marcus Sanders Jr. 25-yard pass from Kyle Vantrease (Alex Raynor kick) (9 plays, 68 yards, 3:08)	LA 30–14
4	14:09	LA	Kenneth Almendares 42-yard field goal (11 plays, 45 yards, 5:16)	LA 33–14
4	11:59	GASO	Alex Raynor 39-yard field goal (8 plays, 60 yards, 2:10)	LA 33–17
4	10:13	LA	Kenneth Almendares 40-yard field goal (5 plays, 19 yards, 1:46)	LA 36–17

Statistics	Georgia Southern	Louisiana
First downs	24	22
Total yards	430	435
Rushing yards	72	242
Passing yards	358	193
Turnovers	1	1
Time of possession	28:18	31:42

Team	Category	Player	Statistics
Georgia Southern	Passing	Kyle Vantrease	28/49, 325 yards, 1 TD
Georgia Southern	Rushing	Gerald Green	10 carries, 44 yards
Georgia Southern	Receiving	Derwin Burgess Jr.	5 receptions, 75 yards, 1 TD
Louisiana	Passing	Ben Wooldridge	17/31, 193 yards, 3 TD, 1 INT
Louisiana	Rushing	Chris Smith	17 carries, 80 yards
Louisiana	Receiving	Michael Jefferson	3 receptions, 53 yards, 1 TD

=== Marshall ===
Game Eleven – Marshall Thundering Herd (6–4) at Georgia Southern Eagles (5–5)

Quarter	1	2	3	4	Total
Thundering Herd	6	14	3	0	23
Eagles	3	7	0	0	10

at Paulson Stadium • Statesboro, Georgia

- Date: Saturday, November 19, 2022
- Game time: 6:00 p.m. EST
- Game weather: Cloudy • Temperature: 52 °F (11 °C) • Wind: 0 mph
- Game attendance: 16,153
- Referee: Trennis Livingston
- TV announcers (ESPN+): Danny Waugh (play-by-play), Cole Neely (anaylst), Emily Grace McWhorter (sideline)

Game information

First quarter

- (13:39) MRSH – EJ Horton 65 yard pass from Cam Fancher, Rece Verhoff kick failed (Drive: 4 plays, 75 yards, 1:21; Marshall 6–0)
- (4:31) GASO – Alex Raynor 46 yard field goal (Drive: 7 plays, 67 yards, 2:58; Marshall 6–3)

Second quarter

- (9:31) MRSH – Shadeed Ahmed 33 yard pass from Cam Fancher, Rece Verhoff kick (Drive: 7 plays, 64 yards, 2:22; Marshall 13–3)
- (7:04) MRSH – Cam Fancher 19 yard run, Rece Verhoff kick (Drive: 5 plays, 57 yards, 1:20; Marshall 20–3)
- (2:16) GASO – Khaleb Hood 27 yard pass from Kyle Vantrease, Alex Raynor kick (Drive: 8 plays, 85 yards, 2:23; Marshall 20–10)

Third quarter

- (7:40) MRSH – Rece Verhoff 36 yard field goal (Drive: 15 plays, 65 yards, 5:23; Marshall 23–10)

Statistics	MRSH	GASO
First downs	29	20
Plays–yards	86–529	64–384
Rushes–yards	54–255	24–179
Passing yards	274	205
Passing: comp–att–int	17–32–0	22–40–1
Time of possession	36:54	23:06

Team	Category	Player	Statistics
Marshall	Passing	Cam Fancher	17/32, 274 yards, 2 TD
Marshall	Rushing	Rasheen Ali	16 carries, 79 yards
Marshall	Receiving	EJ Horton	2 receptions, 76 yards, 1 TD
Georgia Southern	Passing	Kyle Vantrease	22/39, 205 yards, 1 TD, 1 INT
Georgia Southern	Rushing	Jalen White	13 carries, 143 yards
Georgia Southern	Receiving	Jeremy Singleton	8 receptions, 73 yards

=== Appalachian State ===
Appalachian State Mountaineers at Georgia Southern Eagles – Game summary

Quarter	1	2	3	4	OT	2OT	Total
Mountaineers	6	14	11	7	7	3	48
Eagles	7	10	14	7	7	6	51

at Paulson Stadium, Statesboro, Georgia

- Date: November 26
- Game time: 6:00 p.m. EST
- Game weather: Cloudy
- Game attendance: 18,683
- Referee: Wayne Winkler
- TV announcers (ESPN+): Danny Waugh, Cole Neely, Emily Grace McWhorter

Statistics

Statistics	APP	GASO
First downs	25	27
Total yards	629	487
Rushing yards	376	102
Passing yards	253	385
Turnovers	0	2
Time of possession	32:33	27:27

Team	Category	Player	Statistics
Appalachian State	Passing	Chase Brice	15/26, 253 yards
Appalachian State	Rushing	Nate Noel	12 carries, 171 yards, 3 TD
Appalachian State	Receiving	Christian Horn	2 receptions, 55 yards
Georgia Southern	Passing	Kyle Vantrease	34/51, 385 yards, 3 TD, 1 INT
Georgia Southern	Rushing	AJ Brown	14 carries, 62 yards, 1 TD
Georgia Southern	Receiving	Jeremy Singleton	10 receptions, 133 yards

=== Vs. Buffalo (Camellia Bowl) ===
	1	2	3	4	Total
Eagles	0	6	8	7	21
Bulls	0	14	6	3	23

== Staff ==
Name	Position	Consecutive season at Georgia Southern
Clay Helton	Head coach	1st
Kevin Whitley	Assistant head coach/Cornerbacks Coach	1st (4th overall)
Bryan Ellis	Offensive coordinator/quarterbacks coach	1st
Will Harris	Defensive coordinator/Secondary Coach	1st
Ryan Aplin	Pass Game Coordinator/Tight Ends/Inside Receivers coach	1st
Marcus Davis	Wide receivers coach	1st
Matt Merritt	Running Backs Coach	1st
Richard Owens	Run Game Coordinator/ offensive line coach	1st
Rip Rowan	Defensive Line Coach	1st
Aaron Schwanz	Linebackers coach	1st
Turner West	Special Teams Coordinator	1st
Robert Stiner	Head Strength & Conditioning Coach	1st
