= Kevin Barbay =

American football coach (born 1982)

Current position
- Title: Co-offensive coordinator
- Team: Tulsa
- Conference: American

Biographical details
- Born: December 28, 1982 (age 43); Nederland, Texas, U.S.

Playing career
- 2002: Grambling State
- Position: Quarterback

Coaching career (HC unless noted)
- 2003–2004: Monsignor Kelly Catholic HS (TX) (WR)
- 2005–2006: Baylor (GA)
- 2007–2008: Texas A&M–Commerce (QB/WR)
- 2009: North Texas (GA)
- 2010–2011: Warren HS (TX)
- 2012–2013: Lamar (WR/ST)
- 2014: Colorado State (DPP)
- 2015–2017: Florida (DPD)
- 2018: Stephen F. Austin (OC/QB)
- 2019–2020: Central Michigan (AHC/WR)
- 2021: Central Michigan (OC/QB)
- 2022: Appalachian State (OC/QB)
- 2023: Mississippi State (OC/QB)
- 2024: Houston (OC/TE)
- 2025: Kentucky (OA)
- 2026–present: Tulsa (co-OC)

Kevin Barbay (born December 28, 1982) is an American football coach and former player who is the co-offensive coordinator for the Tulsa Golden Hurricane. He previously served as the offensive coordinator and tight ends coach at Houston.

== Coaching career ==
Barbay began his coaching career in high school football before serving in assistant roles at Baylor University and Texas A&M University–Commerce. He later worked at University of North Texas, Lamar University, and Colorado State University in coaching and personnel positions.

Barbay served as director of player personnel at University of Florida before becoming offensive coordinator at Stephen F. Austin State University. He later joined Central Michigan University, where he was promoted to offensive coordinator in 2021.

He subsequently served as offensive coordinator at Appalachian State Mountaineers and Mississippi State before joining Tulsa Golden Hurricane as co-offensive coordinator.
