= Cramton Bowl =

American stadium

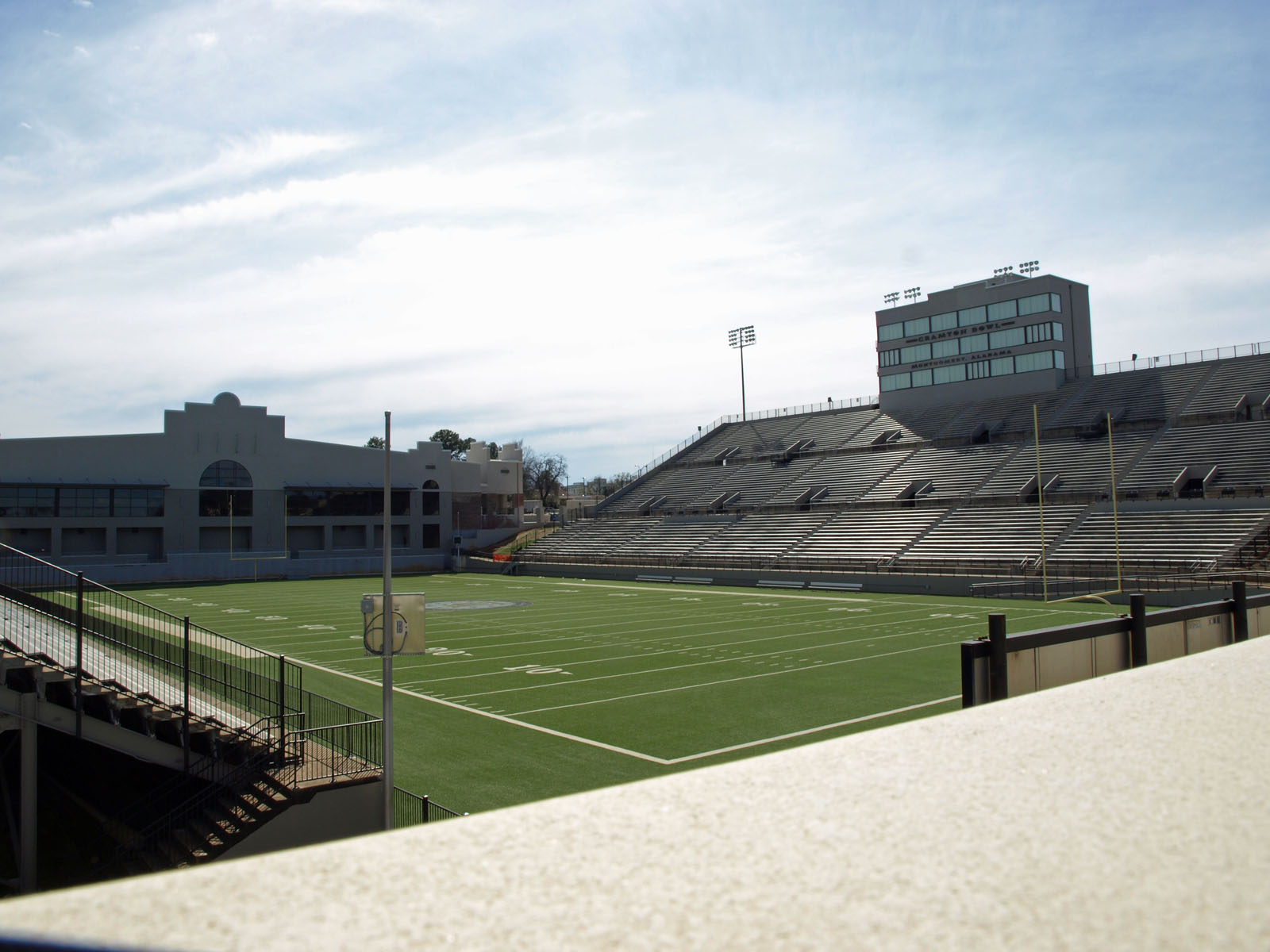
- Cramton Bowl in 2012

- Location in Alabama Location in the United States
- Location: 1022 Madison Avenue, Montgomery, Alabama 36107
- Coordinates: 32.37949°N 86.293002°W
- Owner: City of Montgomery
- Capacity: 25,000
- Surface: UBU Speed S5

Construction
- Opened: 1922

Tenants
- Salute to Veterans Bowl (NCAA FBS) (2014–present); FCS Kickoff (NCAA FCS) (2017–2025); Montgomery Bowl (NCAA FBS) (2020); Blue–Gray Football Classic (1939–2001); Montgomery Public Schools; Alabama State Hornets (SWAC) (1923–2012); Faulkner Eagles (NAIA) (2007–2012); Alabama Crimson Tide (NCAA) (1922–1954); Auburn Tigers (NCAA) (1922–1953); Chattanooga Lookouts (Southern League) (1943); Montgomery Rebels (Southeastern League) (1938–1949); Montgomery Bombers (Southeastern League) (1937); Montgomery Grey Sox (Negro Southern League) (1932); Montgomery Lions (Southeastern League) (1927–1930); Philadelphia Athletics (AL) (spring training) (1923–1924)

Cramton Bowl is a 21,000-seat stadium located in Montgomery, Alabama. Cramton Bowl opened in 1922 as a baseball stadium and has been home to Major League Baseball spring training and to minor league baseball. Today, however, its primary use is for American football.

It is the host of the annual Salute to Veterans Bowl (formerly the Camellia Bowl) for the NCAA Division I Football Bowl Subdivision (FBS) and of Montgomery's five high school squads. It was previously home to the former Blue–Gray Football Classic, a collegiate all-star game usually played on Christmas Day, the Alabama State Hornets football team, the FCS Kickoff, an annual season-opening game in the Division I Football Championship Subdivision, and hosted the first ever football game played under the lights in the South.

== Stadium history ==
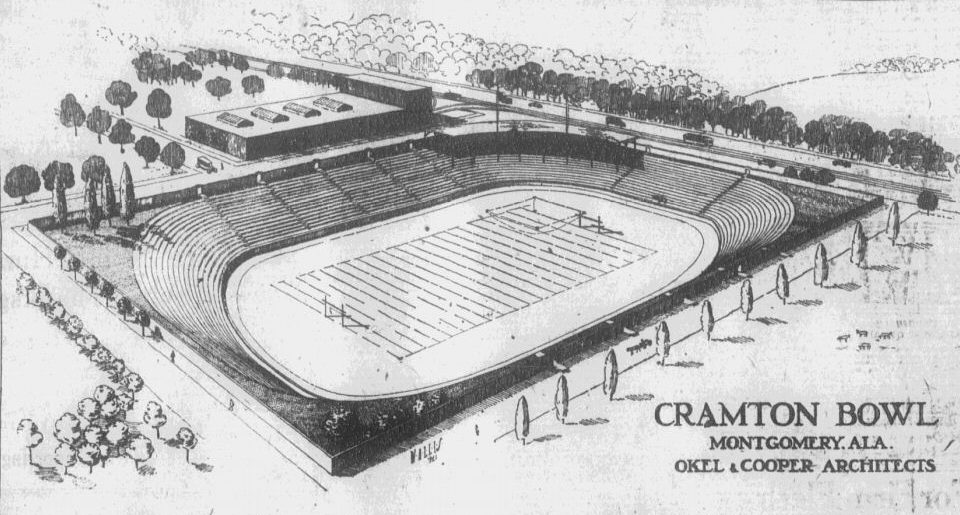
An architect's sketch of Cramton Bowl in 1921

Cramton Bowl is named for Fred J. Cramton, a local businessman who donated the land on which the stadium is built. After a conversation with friends about the need for a baseball stadium, Cramton donated his sanitary landfill to the city so a facility could be constructed there. The city held the land for a time and then returned it, stating that Cramton's stadium idea was too big of a project for the city to undertake. Cramton then decided to take matters into his own hands; with the help of the Junior Chamber of Commerce, Cramton raised $33,000 to build the sports venue.

Seating capacity was expanded in 1929 to 7,991. More additions were made in 1946, increasing the seating capacity to 12,000. East stands were added in 1962 bringing the seating capacity up to 24,000. After new renovations were completed in July 2011 the capacity was reduced to 21,000. The stadium's modern boundaries are Madison Avenue (north); Hall Street (east); Pelham Street (south); and buildings and Hilliard Street (west).

== Baseball ==
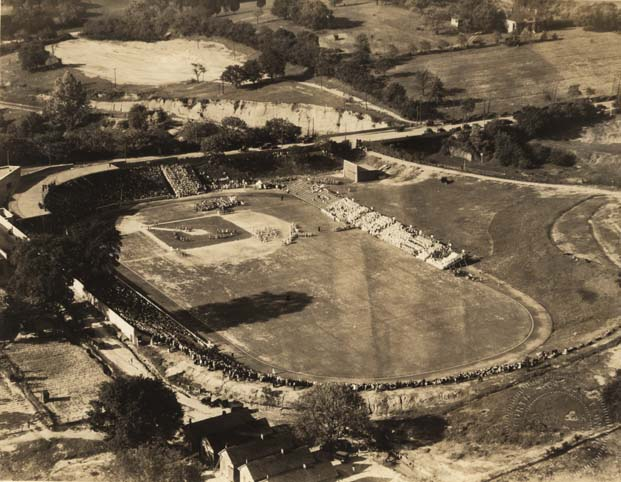
Cramton Bowl during a baseball game in the 1920s or 1930s

The first baseball game played on the new field was in May 1922 between Auburn University and Vanderbilt University. Shortly after its completion in 1922, the Philadelphia Athletics decided to move their spring training operations from Eagle Pass, Texas to Montgomery. They used the facility for their 1923 and 1924 spring training and exhibition games before moving to a newer stadium in Fort Myers, Florida.

After the departure of the Philadelphia Athletics spring training, Minor League Baseball's newly formed Southeastern League placed a team in Montgomery which became known as the Montgomery Lions. The Lions played in Cramton Bowl from 1926 to 1930. There was no team from 1931 to 1936 due to problems within the Southeastern League and the ongoing negative economic effects of the Great Depression. The team returned for the 1937 season as the Montgomery Bombers and garnered their first major league baseball affiliation with the Cleveland Indians. The Indians pulled out for the 1938 season and were replaced by the Philadelphia Phillies. After one season the Phillies dropped their affiliation; the team became a co-op franchise and were renamed the Montgomery Rebels. In 1943, the Rebels would disband due to the manpower shortage caused by World War II. On July 11 of that year, the Chattanooga Lookouts moved their home games to Cramton Bowl to play out the rest of the season. The Lookouts managed to move back to Chattanooga and reverse the trend of declining attendance sometime later in the 1940s. The Rebels returned in 1946 through 1949 before moving to the newly constructed Paterson Field located just across the street.

The eighth and deciding game of the 1943 Negro World Series was held at the Cramton Bowl, with the Homestead Grays defeating the Birmingham Black Barons, 8–4.

== Football ==
On September 23, 1927, Cramton Bowl became the site of the first game played "under the lights" in the South with Cloverdale taking on Pike Road High School. Former superintendent D. H. "Sarge" Caraker remembers fondly, "[We] used dishpans for reflectors and sent to California for the lamps. We drew 7,200 people from all over the South to see it."

=== College football ===
Cramton Bowl was host to all home games for Alabama State Hornets football prior to ASU's construction of an on-campus stadium in 2012 and was the host to all home games for the Faulkner University Eagles football team until 2012 when Faulkner University constructed its own facility. It was also home to the Turkey Day Classic and in 2009 hosted the inaugural HBCU All-star Bowl.

Cramton Bowl also provided a location for Alabama Crimson Tide football home games in the capital city. The Crimson Tide played home games at Cramton Bowl in the 1922 through 1932 seasons, in 1934, from 1944 through 1946 and again from 1951 through 1954. Alabama's all-time record at Cramton Bowl was 17 wins and 3 losses.

Cramton Bowl probably achieved its greatest fame as the home of the Blue–Gray Football Classic, an annual college football all-star game which was held there each December from 1938 until 2001.

Beginning in 2014, Cramton Bowl began hosting the Camellia Bowl, a college football bowl game with tie-ins with the Sun Belt Conference and Mid-American Conference. The game was renamed the Salute to Veterans Bowl in 2024.

In 2017, the stadium became the regular host of the FCS Kickoff, a season-opening Division I FCS game operated by ESPN and nationally televised on one of ESPN's networks. However, in 2026, the FCS Kickoff reverted back to being played on college campuses.

In October 2020, Cramton Bowl was announced as the host stadium for the Montgomery Bowl, a one-off bowl game played in December 2020, during the pandemic.

=== High school football ===
Several area high schools call Cramton Bowl home including the Johnson Abernathy Graetz Jaguars, Percy Julian Phoenix, Park Crossing High School Thunderbirds, and Carver Wolverines. In July 2011, Cramton Bowl hosted the Alabama High School Athletic Association Alabama All-Stars Sports Week football game.

== 2011 renovations ==
By the start of the 21st century, Cramton Bowl was widely regarded as being functionally obsolete for major sporting events. The stadium's relatively small capacity was not a concern as much as its age and condition. The stadium was not well maintained for most of its history, and by the dawn of the new millennium, it was actually crumbling. These issues were factors, although not the predominant ones, in the Blue-Gray Game not being held in 2002 and its subsequent relocation in 2003 to Troy University's Veterans Memorial Stadium, about 50 miles (80 km) from Montgomery.

In mid-2010 the City of Montgomery approved a measure for a $10 million renovation and addition to Cramton Bowl. The renovations planned for Cramton Bowl were a unique mix of the old and the new. The old structure was revamped and updated with four entrances, a state-of-the-art press box, an aesthetically enhanced plaza area, and a "Walk of Fame," which celebrates Montgomery's sports history and houses various articles of historic sports memorabilia. Perhaps the most important and impressive addition was the 90,000-square-foot (8,400 m^{2}) multi-purpose sports facility. Demolition of the north end zone and press box began in late November 2010, which was phase one of the project. Phase two began in early January 2011 as crews removed an existing brick wall from the south end zone and dismantled the scoreboard to make way for the new multi-purpose sports facility. Work on the stadium was completed in 2011 while the new multi-purpose facility was finished in 2012.
