= Kyle Vantrease =

American football player (born 1998)

No. 6
- Position: Quarterback

Personal information
- Born: August 20, 1998 (age 28); Stow, Ohio, U.S.
- Listed height: 6 ft 2 in (1.88 m)
- Listed weight: 225 lb (102 kg)

Career information
- High school: Stow–Munroe Falls
- College: Buffalo (2017–2021); Georgia Southern (2022)
- NFL draft: 2023: undrafted

Career history
- Indianapolis Colts (2023)*; Tampa Bay Buccaneers (2023)*; Calgary Stampeders (2024)*
- * Offseason or practice squad member only

Awards and highlights
- Third-team All-Sun Belt (2022)

Kyle Vantrease (born August 20, 1998) is an American professional football quarterback. He played college football for the Buffalo Bulls and Georgia Southern Eagles.

== Early life ==
Vantrease attended Stow–Munroe Falls High School in Stow, Ohio.

== College career ==
=== Buffalo ===
Vantreaase began his college career at the University at Buffalo, playing for the Bulls football team from 2017 to 2021. He passed for 1,193 yards in 2019, 1,325 yards in 2020, and 1,861 yards in 2021. In addition to playing quarterback, Vantrease served as Buffalo's primary punter for three games in the 2019 season after Buffalo's starting punter suffered a season-ending injury in the second game of the season. In December 2021, he entered the NCAA transfer portal.

=== Georgia Southern ===
In 2022, Vantrease transferred to Georgia Southern University. In his second game for Georgia Southern, he won Sunbelt Conference player of the week honors after passing for 409 yards and leading the team to a 45–42 upset victory over Nebraska. On October 15, he completed 38 of 64 passes for a school-record 578 yards against James Madison. He ranked fifth among Division I FBS leaders with 4,254 passing yards during the 2022 season.

=== Statistics ===
Year	Team	Games		Passing								Rushing			
Year	Team	GP	Record	Comp	Att	Pct	Yards	Avg	TD	Int	Rate	Att	Yards	Avg	TD
2017	Buffalo	2	0–1	25	57	43.9	355	6.2	2	2	100.7	8	−26	−3.3	0
2018	Buffalo	3	0–0	4	9	44.4	20	2.2	0	0	63.1	1	4	4.0	0
2019	Buffalo	13	6–2	101	172	58.7	1,193	6.9	8	2	130.0	25	64	2.6	6
2020	Buffalo	7	6–1	96	154	62.3	1,326	8.6	7	3	145.8	11	38	3.5	4
2021	Buffalo	10	4–5	161	262	61.5	1,861	7.1	8	6	126.6	31	115	3.7	3
2022	Georgia Southern	13	6–7	370	630	61.4	4,247	7.0	27	16	130.0	33	34	1.0	3
Career		48	22–16	757	1,257	60.2	9,002	7.2	52	29	129.4	109	229	2.1	16
