= Kevin Whitley =

American football player and coach (born 1970)

Westlake High School (GA)
- Title: Head coach

Personal information
- Born: February 26, 1970 (age 56); Greenville, North Carolina, U.S.
- Listed height: 5 ft 10 in (1.78 m)
- Listed weight: 190 lb (86 kg)

Career information
- High school: Lakeside (DeKalb County, Georgia)
- College: Georgia Southern
- NFL draft: 1992: undrafted

Career history

Playing
- New England Patriots (1992)*; Toronto Argonauts (1993–1995)
- * Offseason or practice squad member only

Coaching
- Redan HS (GA) (1996–1997) Defensive backs coach; North Springs HS (GA) (1998–2000) Assistant head coach & defensive coordinator; North Springs HS (GA) (2001–2002) Head coach; Creekside HS (GA) (2003–2008) Head coach; Stockbridge HS (GA) (2009–2018) Head coach; Georgia Southern (2019–2021) Cornerbacks coach; Georgia Southern (2021) Interim head coach; Georgia Southern (2022–2023) Assistant head coach/cornerbacks coach; Northgate HS (GA) (2024–present) Head coach

Career CFL statistics
- Games played: 23
- Total tackles: 70
- Interceptions: 2

Head coaching record
- Career: NCAA: 2–6 (.250)

Kevin Whitley (born February 26, 1970) is an American football coach and former cornerback who is a head football coach at Northgate High School in Newnan, Georgia, a position he has held since 2024. Previously, he assumed the role of interim head coach and cornerbacks coach at Georgia Southern, and is longtime high school coach in Georgia. Whitley also played professionally in the Canadian Football League (CFL) for the Toronto Argonauts for three seasons.

== Head coaching record ==
=== College ===
Year	Team	Overall	Conference	Standing	Bowl/playoffs
Georgia Southern Eagles (Sun Belt Conference) (2021)
2021	Georgia Southern	2–6 (Note: Served as interim head coach after Chad Lunsford was fired after 4 games.)	2–5	5th (East)	
Georgia Southern:		2–6	2–5		
Total:		2–6			
