= Georgia Southern Eagles football statistical leaders =

The following lists give individual statistical leaders of the Georgia Southern Eagles football program in various categories, including passing, rushing, receiving, total offense, defensive stats, and kicking. Within those areas, the lists identify single-game, single-season, and career leaders. The Eagles represent Georgia Southern University in the NCAA Division I FBS Sun Belt Conference.

Although Georgia Southern competed in intercollegiate football as early as 1924, the school dropped football after the 1940 season and did not reinstate the program until 1982, initially playing at club level until resuming varsity play in 1984. Because records from the 1924-1940 period are often incomplete and inconsistent, the school's record book only include players from 1982 on.

Recordkeeping notes:

- From 1984 through 2013, Georgia Southern played in the second level of Division I football, currently known as Division I FCS (known before the 2006 season as Division I-AA). Official NCAA season and career statistical totals do not include statistics recorded in I-AA/FCS playoff games before 2002, and most programs that played in FCS before 2002 follow this practice. Southern does not; its official single-season and career leaderboards incorporate statistics from all FCS playoff games. During their FCS tenure, the Eagles made the playoffs 19 times and played in 68 playoff games (with 43 of these games before 2002), giving many players in that era multiple extra games to amass statistics.
- The NCAA did not count bowl games toward official season statistics until 2002 (at that time, Southern was in what is now known as FCS). The Eagles have appeared in five bowl games since their first season of bowl eligibility in 2015, giving players in those seasons an extra game to amass statistics.
- The Sun Belt Conference has held a championship game since 2018; however, Southern has yet to appear in that game.
- Due to COVID-19 issues, the NCAA ruled that the 2020 season would not count against the athletic eligibility of any football player, giving everyone who played in that season the opportunity for five years of eligibility instead of the normal four.

During much of their history, the Eagles have run an option offense, focused on running over passing. Therefore, the Eagles' passing records tend to be lower than at most other schools. Exceptions to this trend are the years 2006 through 2009, when the Eagles scrapped the option offense under head coaches Brian VanGorder and Chris Hatcher, and since 2022, when new head coach Clay Helton installed a pro-style pass-oriented offense. Notably, Kyle Vantrease took only six games in 2022 to set a new single-season passing yardage record, and more than doubled the previous record by the end of the regular season. Despite only playing at Southern for one season (he had played at Buffalo in five seasons, with one redshirt season and an extra year of eligibility due to COVID-19), he is second on the team's career passing yardage list.

These lists are updated through the 2025 season.

== Passing ==
=== Passing yards ===
Career
Rank	Player	Yards	Years
1	JC French	5,882	2023 2024 2025
2	Tracy Ham	5,757	1983 1984 1985 1986
3	Kyle Vantrease	4,253	2022
4	Raymond Gross	3,806	1987 1988 1989 1990
5	Davis Brin	3,781	2023
6	Shai Werts	3,777	2017 2018 2019 2020
7	Greg Hill	3,369	1996 1997 1998 1999
8	Kevin Ellison	3,225	2013 2014 2015 2016
9	Kenny Robinson	3,203	1994 1995 1996 1997
10	Jaybo Shaw	2,709	2010 2011

Single season
Rank	Player	Yards	Year
1	Kyle Vantrease	4,253	2022
2	Davis Brin	3,781	2023
3	JC French	2,929	2025
4	JC French	2,831	2024
5	Antonio Henton	1,852	2008
6	Travis Clark	1,808	2006
7	Lee Chapple	1,774	2009
8	Tracy Ham	1,772	1986
9	Tracy Ham	1,694	1984
10	Raymond Gross	1,534	1990

Single game
Rank	Player	Yards	Years	Opponent
1	Kyle Vantrease	578	2022	James Madison
2	Tracy Ham	419	1985	Furman
3	Kyle Vantrease	409	2022	Nebraska
4	Tracy Ham	402	1984	East Carolina
5	Kyle Vantrease	389	2022	Appalachian State
6	Davis Brin	383	2023	Wisconsin
7	Travis Clark	375	2006	Elon
8	Kyle Vantrease	367	2022	Morgan State
9	Kyle Vantrease	360	2022	Georgia State
10	Kyle Vantrease	352	2022	Buffalo (Camellia Bowl)
	JC French	352	2025	App State

=== Passing touchdowns ===
Career
Rank	Player	TDs	Years
1	JC French	38	2023 2024 2025
2	Tracy Ham	34	1983 1984 1985 1986
	Shai Werts	34	2017 2018 2019 2020
4	Kyle Vantrease	27	2022
5	Davis Brin	24	2023
6	Chaz Williams	23	2001 2002 2003 2004
7	Greg Hill	22	1996 1997 1998 1999
8	Kevin Ellison	19	2013 2014 2015 2016
9	Raymond Gross	18	1987 1988 1989 1990
	J. R. Revere	18	1998 1999 2000 2001

Single season
Rank	Player	TDs	Year
1	Kyle Vantrease	27	2022
2	Davis Brin	24	2023
3	JC French	20	2025
4	JC French	17	2024
5	Antonio Henton	15	2008
6	Chaz Williams	13	2004
7	Tracy Ham	12	1984
8	J. R. Revere	11	2000
9	Jaybo Shaw	10	2011
	Shai Werts	10	2018

Single game
Rank	Player	TDs	Years	Opponent
1	Tracy Ham	4	1985	Furman
	Greg Hill	4	1998	Western Illinois
	Chaz Williams	4	2004	Elon
	Kyle Vantrease	4	2022	Morgan State
	Kyle Vantrease	4	2022	James Madison
	Davis Brin	4	2023	Ball State
	Max Johnson	4	2026	Marshall
8	Joe Dupree	3	1993	Concord
	J. R. Revere	3	2000	Chattanooga
	Chaz Williams	3	2002	Western Carolina
	Chaz Williams	3	2004	Appalachian State
	Jayson Foster	3	2007	Furman
	Antonio Henton	3	2008	The Citadel
	Jaybo Shaw	3	2011	Elon
	Shai Werts	3	2020	UMass
	Kyle Vantrease	3	2022	Georgia State
	Kyle Vantrease	3	2022	Appalachian State
	Davis Brin	3	2023	Coastal Carolina
	Davis Brin	3	2023	Georgia State
	Davis Brin	3	2023	Marshall
	Davis Brin	3	2023	Appalachian State
	JC French	3	2024	James Madison
	JC French	3	2025	Georgia State
	Max Johnson	3	2026	Houston
	Max Johnson	3	2026	Coastal Carolina
	Max Johnson	3	2026	James Madison

== Rushing ==
=== Rushing yards ===
Career
Rank	Player	Yards	Years
1	Adrian Peterson	6,559	1998 1999 2000 2001
2	Jermaine Austin	5,411	2002 2003 2004 2005
3	Jerick McKinnon	3,899	2010 2011 2012 2013
4	Joe Ross	3,876	1987 1988 1989 1990
5	Jayson Foster	3,835	2004 2005 2006 2007
6	Matt Breida	3,754	2013 2014 2015 2016
7	Kevin Ellison	3,368	2013 2014 2015 2016
8	Roderick Russell	3,326	1994 1995 1996 1997
9	Greg Hill	3,309	1996 1997 1998 1999
10	Tracy Ham	3,212	1983 1984 1985 1986

Single season
Rank	Player	Yards	Year
1	Adrian Peterson	1,932	1998
2	Jayson Foster	1,844	2007
3	Jerick McKinnon	1,817	2012
4	Adrian Peterson	1,807	1999
5	Matt Breida	1,608	2015
6	Jermaine Austin	1,546	2005
7	Matt Breida	1,485	2014
8	Jayson Foster	1,481	2005
9	Jermaine Austin	1,461	2003
10	Adrian Peterson	1,459	2001

Single game
Rank	Player	Yards	Years	Opponent
1	Adrian Peterson	333	1999	Massachusetts
2	Jerick McKinnon	316	2012	Central Arkansas
3	Joe Ross	280	1989	Marshall
4	Jayson Foster	279	2007	Wofford
5	OJ Arnold	267	2025	Coastal Carolina
6	Dominique Swope	255	2011	Old Dominion
7	Jayson Foster	253	2007	Coastal Carolina
8	Adrian Peterson	247	1999	Youngstown State
9	Greg Hill	238	1997	Florida A&M
10	Adrian Peterson	232	1998	Connecticut

=== Rushing touchdowns ===
Career
Rank	Player	TDs	Years
1	Adrian Peterson	84	1998 1999 2000 2001
2	Chaz Williams	62	2001 2002 2003 2004
3	Jayson Foster	54	2004 2005 2006 2007
4	Gerald Harris	53	1983 1984 1985 1986
5	Greg Hill	49	1996 1997 1998 1999
6	Ernest Thompson	42	1985 1986 1987 1988 1989
	Jerick McKinnon	42	2010 2011 2012 2013
8	Tracy Ham	41	1983 1984 1985 1986
9	La Ramsby	39	2014 2015 2016 2017
10	Matt Breida	37	2013 2014 2015 2016

Single season
Rank	Player	TDs	Year
1	Adrian Peterson	28	1999
2	Chaz Williams	27	2002
3	Adrian Peterson	25	1998
	Chaz Williams	25	2004
5	Jayson Foster	24	2007
6	Jayson Foster	21	2005
7	Jerick McKinnon	20	2012
8	Ernest Thompson	19	1988
9	Tracy Ham	18	1986
	Adrian Peterson	18	2001

Single game
Rank	Player	TDs	Years	Opponent
1	Jayson Foster	6	2007	Coastal Carolina
2	Gerald Harris	5	1986	North Carolina A&T
	Adrian Peterson	5	1998	The Citadel
	Adrian Peterson	5	1999	Massachusetts

== Receiving ==
=== Receptions ===
Career
Rank	Player	Rec	Years
1	Khaleb Hood	252	2019 2020 2021 2022 2023
2	Derwin Burgess Jr.	208	2021 2022 2023 2024
3	Dalen Cobb	157	2022 2023 2024 2025
4	Raja Andrews	127	2005 2006 2007 2008
5	Monty Sharpe	92	1983 1984 1985 1986
	B. J. Johnson III	92	2013 2014 2015 2016
7	Marcus Sanders Jr.	85	2022 2023 2024 2025
8	Tony Belser	80	1985 1986 1987 1988
9	Corey Joyner	71	1994 1995 1996 1997
10	Terrence Sorrell	70	1989 1990 1991 1992

Single season
Rank	Player	Rec	Year
1	Khaleb Hood	101	2023
2	Khaleb Hood	87	2022
3	Derwin Burgess Jr.	74	2023
4	Jeremy Singleton	66	2022
5	Camden Brown	65	2025
6	Raja Andrews	64	2008
7	Derwin Burgess Jr.	59	2024
8	Derwin Burgess Jr.	58	2022
9	Dalen Cobb	57	2025
10	Dalen Cobb	52	2024

Single game
Rank	Player	Rec	Years	Opponent
1	Derwin Burgess Jr.	12	2022	Nebraska
	Khaleb Hood	12	2023	Coastal Carolina
	Camden Brown	12	2025	Southern Miss
4	Khaleb Hood	11	2022	Georgia State
5	Raja Andrews	10	2008	The Citadel
	Raja Andrews	10	2008	Samford
	Jeremy Singleton	10	2022	Appalachian State
	Khaleb Hood	10	2022	Appalachian State
	Khaleb Hood	10	2023	James Madison
	Khaleb Hood	10	2023	Appalachian State
	Alex Taylor	10	2026	Appalachian State

=== Receiving yards ===
Career
Rank	Player	Yards	Years
1	Khaleb Hood	2,692	2019 2020 2021 2022 2023
2	Derwin Burgess Jr.	2,500	2021 2022 2023 2024
3	Monty Sharpe	1,854	1983 1984 1985 1986
4	Dalen Cobb	1,779	2022 2023 2024 2025
5	Raja Andrews	1,538	2005 2006 2007 2008
6	Tony Belser	1,472	1985 1986 1987 1988
7	B. J. Johnson III	1,377	2013 2014 2015 2016
8	Corey Joyner	1,332	1994 1995 1996 1997 1998
9	Chris Johnson	1,316	1997 1998 1999 2000
10	Terrence Sorrell	1,302	1989 1990 1991 1992

Single season
Rank	Player	Yards	Year
1	Camden Brown	1,079	2025
2	Khaleb Hood	948	2023
3	Khaleb Hood	925	2022
4	Raja Andrews	873	2008
5	Derwin Burgess Jr.	813	2023
6	Marcus Sanders Jr.	797	2025
7	Derwin Burgess Jr.	717	2022
8	Jeremy Singleton	714	2022
9	Chris Johnson	673	2000
10	Derwin Burgess Jr.	659	2024

Single game
Rank	Player	Yards	Years	Opponent
1	Reggie McCutchen	191	2006	Elon
2	Deryl Belser	170	1991	James Madison
3	Amare Jones	164	2022	James Madison
4	Camden Brown	158	2025	Southern Miss
5	Camden Brown	157	2025	Marshall
6	Corey Joyner	153	1997	Valdosta State
7	Frank Johnson	148	1985	Furman
8	Ricky Harris	143	1986	Arkansas State
	Raja Andrews	143	2008	Elon
10	Herman Barton	142	1985	South Carolina State

=== Receiving touchdowns ===
Career
Rank	Player	TDs	Years
1	Monty Sharpe	18	1983 1984 1985 1986
2	Derwin Burgess Jr.	17	2021 2022 2023 2024
3	Camden Brown	14	2025
4	Chris Johnson	13	1997 1998 1999 2000
	Teddy Craft	13	2003 2004 2005
6	Tony Belser	10	1985 1986 1987 1988
	Corey Joyner	10	1994 1995 1996 1997 1998
	Khaleb Hood	10	2019 2020 2021 2022 2023
9	Raja Andrews	9	2005 2006 2007 2008
	Kentrellis Showers	9	2010 2011 2012 2013 2014
	Dalen Cobb	9	2022 2023 2024 2025

Single season
Rank	Player	TDs	Year
1	Camden Brown	14	2025
2	Chris Johnson	8	2000
3	Corey Joyner	7	1997
	Teddy Craft	7	2004
	Derwin Burgess Jr.	7	2022
6	Amare Jones	6	2022
	Derwin Burgess Jr.	6	2023
	Josh Dallas	6	2024
9	Monty Sharpe	5	1984
	Monty Sharpe	5	1985
	Monty Sharpe	5	1986
	Teddy Craft	5	2005
	Raja Andrews	5	2008
	Khaleb Hood	5	2023
	Marcus Sanders Jr.	5	2025

Single game
Rank	Player	TDs	Years	Opponent
1	Corey Joyner	3	1998	Western Illinois
	Camden Brown	3	2025	Coastal Carolina

== Total offense ==
Total offense is the sum of passing and rushing statistics. It does not include receiving or returns. Georgia Southern's record book lists only the single-game leader; however, the previous single-game record was broken during the 2022 season.

=== Total offense yards ===
Career
Rank	Player	Yards	Years
1	Tracy Ham	8,969	1983 1984 1985 1986
2	Shai Werts	6,860	2017 2018 2019 2020
3	Greg Hill	6,678	1996 1997 1998 1999
4	Kevin Ellison	6,593	2013 2014 2015 2016
5	Adrian Peterson	6,589	1998 1999 2000 2001
6	JC French	6,484	2023 2024 2025
7	Raymond Gross	6,096	1987 1988 1989 1990
8	Jayson Foster	5,934	2004 2005 2006 2007
9	Jermaine Austin	5,411	2002 2003 2004 2005
10	Chaz Williams	5,302	2001 2002 2003 2004

Single season
Rank	Player	Yards	Year
1	Kyle Vantrease	4,287	2022
2	Davis Brin	3,721	2023
3	JC French	3,244	2025
4	JC French	3,070	2024
5	Jayson Foster	3,047	2007
6	Tracy Ham	2,820	1986
7	Antonio Henton	2,480	2008
8	Chaz Williams	2,444	2002
9	Jerick McKinnon	2,414	2012
10	Tracy Ham	2,401	1984

Single game
Rank	Player	Yards	Years	Opponent
1	Kyle Vantrease	576	2022	James Madison
2	Tracy Ham	509	1985	Furman

=== Touchdowns responsible for ===
"Touchdowns responsible for" is the official NCAA term for combined passing and rushing touchdowns. Georgia Southern's record book includes career and single-season leaders, but not single-game leaders.

Career
Rank	Player	TDs	Years
1	Adrian Peterson	85	1998 1999 2000 2001
	Chaz Williams	85	2001 2002 2003 2004
3	Tracy Ham	77	1983 1984 1985 1986
4	Greg Hill	75	1996 1997 1998 1999
5	Jayson Foster	70	2004 2005 2006 2007
6	Shai Werts	68	2017 2018 2019 2020
7	Jerick McKinnon	54	2010 2011 2012 2013
8	Kevin Ellison	54	2013 2014 2015 2016
9	Gerald Harris	53	1983 1984 1985 1986
	J. R. Revere	53	1998 1999 2000 2001

Single season
Rank	Player	TDs	Year
1	Chaz Williams	38	2004
2	Chaz Williams	36	2002
3	Jayson Foster	30	2007
	Kyle Vantrease	30	2022
5	Jayson Foster	29	2005
6	Adrian Peterson	28	1999
7	Tracy Ham	27	1986
	Jerick McKinnon	27	2012
9	JC French	26	2025
10	Adrian Peterson	25	1998
	Greg Hill	25	1999
	Shai Werts	25	2018
	Davis Brin	25	2023

== Defense ==
=== Interceptions ===
Career
Rank	Player	Ints	Years
1	Nay Young	16	1983 1984 1985 1986 1987
2	Rodney Oglesby	15	1988 1989 1990 1991
3	Taz Dixon	12	1986 1987 1988 1989
	Laron Scott	12	2009 2010 2011
5	Arkee Thompson	11	1998 1999
6	Marco Bradham	10	1992 1993 1994 1995
	A. J. Bryant	10	2002 2003 2004 2005
8	Kevin Whitley	9	1988 1989 1990 1991
	Jim Mutimer	9	1990 1991
	David Young	9	1999 2000 2001 2002
	Kindle Vildor	9	2016 2017 2018 2019

Single season
Rank	Player	Ints	Year
1	Randell Boone	6	1989
	Jim Mutimer	6	1991
	Earthwind Moreland	6	1998
	Arkee Thompson	6	1998
	Nate Gates	6	2000
	A. J. Bryant	6	2004
	Laron Scott	6	2010
	Antonio Glover	6	2015
	Derrick Canteen	6	2020

Single game
Rank	Player	Ints	Years	Opponent
1	Rodney Oglesby	3	1991	Savannah State
	Antonio Glover	3	2015	Western Michigan

=== Tackles ===
Career
Rank	Player	Tackles	Years
1	Paul Carroll	375	1991 1992 1993 1994
2	Marques Watson-Trent	358	2020 2021 2022 2023 2024
3	Freddy Pesqueira	353	1999 2000 2001 2002
4	John Mohring	316	2003 2004 2005 2006
5	Edward Thomas	308	1993 1994 1995 1996
6	Nick Davis	292	1990 1991 1992 1993
7	Joe Scott	290	1999 2000 2001 2002 2003
8	Rob Stockton	282	1992 1993 1994 1995
9	Derrick Butler	279	2001 2002 2003 2004
10	D. T. Tanner	267	1994 1995 1996 1997

Single season
Rank	Player	Tackles	Year
1	Mike West	133	1990
2	Edward Thomas	130	1996
3	Paul Carroll	127	1994
4	James Dickerson	121	1997
5	Marques Watson-Trent	120	2024
6	Jessie Jenkins	117	1985
7	Joe Scott	116	2002
	Marques Watson-Trent	116	2023
9	Marques Watson-Trent	113	2022
10	Lee Brooks	112	1996
	Joe Scott	112	2001
	John Mohring	112	2005

Single game
Rank	Player	Tackles	Years	Opponent
1	Jessie Jenkins	22	1985	Troy
	Edward Thomas	22	1996	VMI
	James Dickerson	22	1997	South Florida
4	Everett Sharpe	21	1988	The Citadel
5	Edward Thomas	20	1996	The Citadel
6	Chris Covington	19	2008	Wofford

=== Sacks ===
Career
Rank	Player	Sacks	Years
1	Brent Russell	25.0	2009 2010 2011 2012
2	Edward Thomas	24.0	1993 1994 1995 1996
3	Freddy Pesqueira	23.5	1999 2000 2001 2002
4	Raymond Johnson III	16.5	2017 2018 2019 2020
5	Eric Davis	16.0	1996 1997 1998
6	Darren Alford	15.5	1987 1988
	Giff Smith	15.5	1987 1988 1989 1990
8	Michael Morris	14.0	1991 1992 1993 1994
9	Steve Bussoletti	13.5	1988 1989 1990 1991
	Eric Hadley	13.5	2001 2002 2003 2004

Single season
Rank	Player	Sacks	Year
1	Darren Alford	15.5	1988
2	Eric Davis	11.0	1998
3	Edward Thomas	10.5	1995
4	Alex Mash	9.5	1993
	Edward Thomas	9.5	1996
6	Dakota Walker	8.5	2008
7	Giff Smith	8.0	1988
	Brent Russell	8.0	2010
9	Michael Morris	7.0	1994

Single game
Rank	Player	Sacks	Years	Opponent
1	Giff Smith	5.0	1988	Chattanooga

== Kicking ==
=== Field goals made ===
Career
Rank	Player	FGs	Years
1	Adrian Mora	57	2008 2009 2010 2011
2	Tyler Bass	54	2016 2017 2018 2019
3	Tim Foley	50	1984 1985 1986 1987
4	Alex Raynor	45	2020 2021 2022
5	Reed Haley	36	1992 1993 1994
6	Younghoe Koo	31	2013 2014 2015 2016
7	Scott Shelton	28	1999 2000 2001 2002
8	Mike Dowis	27	1988 1989 1990
	David Cool	27	1988 1989 1990 1991
	Alex Hanks	27	2012 2013 2014 2015

Single season
Rank	Player	FGs	Year
1	Michael Lantz	23	2023
2	Tyler Bass	20	2019
3	Adrian Mora	19	2010
	Younghoe Koo	19	2016
	Tyler Bass	19	2018
6	Alex Raynor	18	2020
	Alex Raynor	18	2022
8	Tim Foley	17	1987
	Jesse Hartley	17	2007
	Tripp Bryant	17	2025

Single game
Rank	Player	FGs	Years	Opponent
1	Reed Haley	5	1994	The Citadel
	Sean Holland	5	2003	Furman

=== Field goal percentage ===
Career
Rank	Player	FG%	Years
1	Younghoe Koo	88.6%	2013 2014 2015 2016
2	Tripp Bryant	85.0%	2025
3	Gavin Stewart	83.3%	2024
4	Adrian Mora	82.6%	2008 2009 2010 2011
5	Mike Dowis	81.8%	1988 1989 1990
6	Tim Foley	80.6%	1984 1985 1986 1987
7	Tyler Bass	79.4%	2016 2017 2018 2019
8	Sean Holland	77.8%	2001 2002 2003
9	Michael Lantz	76.7%	2022 2023
10	Alex Raynor	76.2%	2020 2021 2022

Single season
Rank	Player	FG%	Year
1	Jonathan Dudley	100.0%	2004
2	Younghoe Koo	95.0%	2016
3	Tim Foley	94.1%	1985
4	Tim Foley	90.9%	1986
5	Adrian Mora	90.5%	2010
	Tyler Bass	90.5%	2018
7	Alex Raynor	90.0%	2022
8	David Simmons	88.9%	1983
9	Eric Meng	85.7%	1997
	Chris Chambers	85.7%	1998
	Adrian Mora	85.7%	2011
