= 2025 Georgia Southern Eagles football team =

American college football season

2025 Georgia Southern Eagles football

Birmingham Bowl champion

Birmingham Bowl, W 29–10 vs. Appalachian State
- Conference: Sun Belt Conference
- East Division
- Record: 7–6 (4–4 Sun Belt)
- Head coach: Clay Helton (4th season)
- Offensive coordinator: Ryan Aplin (2nd season)
- Offensive scheme: Multiple
- Defensive coordinator: Brandon Bailey (3rd season)
- Base defense: 4–2–5
- Home stadium: Paulson Stadium

2025 Sun Belt Conference football standings
	Conf.			Overall
Team	W		L	W		L
East Division
No. 19 James Madison xy$^	8	–	0	12	–	2
Old Dominion	6	–	2	10	–	3
Coastal Carolina	5	–	3	6	–	7
Georgia Southern	4	–	4	7	–	6
Marshall	3	–	5	5	–	7
Appalachian State	2	–	6	5	–	8
Georgia State	0	–	8	1	–	11
West Division
Troy xy	6	–	2	8	–	6
Southern Miss	5	–	3	7	–	6
Louisiana	5	–	3	6	–	7
Arkansas State	5	–	3	7	–	6
Texas State	3	–	5	7	–	6
South Alabama	3	–	5	4	–	8
Louisiana–Monroe	1	–	7	3	–	9
Championship: James Madison 31, Troy 14
^ – College Football Playoff participant; $ – Conference champion; x – Division champion/co-champions; y – Championship game participant; Rankings from AP Poll

The 2025 Georgia Southern Eagles football team represented Georgia Southern University in the Sun Belt Conference's East Division during the 2025 NCAA Division I FBS football season. The Eagles were led by Clay Helton in his fourth year as the head coach. The Eagles played their home games at Paulson Stadium, located in Statesboro, Georgia.

== Preseason ==
=== Media poll ===
In the Sun Belt preseason coaches' poll, the Eagles were picked to finish second in the East Division.

Offensive linemen Caleb Cook and Pichon Wimbley and wide receiver Josh Dallas were selected to the preseason All-Sun Belt first team offense. Defensive lineman Latrell Bullard, linebacker Brendan Harrington and defensive back Chance Gamble were named to the All-Sun Belt first team defense. Punter Alex Smith was named to the All-Sun Belt first team special teams.

Wide receiver Dalen Cobb and defensive back Tracy Hill Jr. were named to the second team.

== Schedule ==
Date	Time	Opponent	Site	TV	Result	Attendance
August 30	9:30 p.m.	at Fresno State*	Valley Children's Stadium; Fresno, CA	FS1	L 14–42	36,801
September 6	7:30 p.m.	at USC*	Los Angeles Memorial Coliseum; Los Angeles, CA	FS1	L 20–59	66,514
September 13	7:00 p.m.	Jacksonville State*	Paulson Stadium; Statesboro, GA	ESPN+	W 41–34	24,585
September 20	7:00 p.m.	Maine*	Paulson Stadium; Statesboro, GA	ESPN+	W 45–17	23,217
September 27	1:30 p.m.	at James Madison	Bridgeforth Stadium; Harrisonburg, VA	ESPN+	L 10–35	25,029
October 9	8:00 p.m.	Southern Miss	Paulson Stadium; Statesboro, GA	ESPN2	L 35–38	20,032
October 18	7:00 p.m.	Georgia State^{†}	Paulson Stadium; Statesboro, GA (rivalry)	ESPN+	W 41–24	25,428
October 25	7:00 p.m.	at Arkansas State	Centennial Bank Stadium; Jonesboro, AR	ESPN+	L 24–34	16,341
November 6	7:30 p.m.	at Appalachian State	Kidd Brewer Stadium; Boone, NC (rivalry)	ESPN2	W 25–23	31,876
November 15	6:00 p.m.	Coastal Carolina	Paulson Stadium; Statesboro, GA	ESPN+	W 45–40	22,738
November 22	1:00 p.m.	Old Dominion	Paulson Stadium; Statesboro, GA	ESPN+	L 10–45	19,247
November 29	1:30 p.m.	at Marshall	Joan C. Edwards Stadium; Huntington, WV	ESPN+	W 24–19	21,524
December 29	1:00 p.m.	vs. Appalachian State*	Protective Stadium; Birmingham, AL (Birmingham Bowl)	ESPN	W 29–10	12,092
*Non-conference game; ^{†}Homecoming; All times are in Eastern time

== Game summaries ==
=== at Fresno State ===
Georgia Southern Eagles (0–0) at Fresno State Bulldogs (0–1) – Game summary

Quarter	1	2	3	4	Total
Eagles	7	7	0	0	14
Bulldogs	10	3	15	14	42

at Valley Children's Stadium • Fresno, CA

- Date: August 30, 2025
- Game time: 9:30 PM EDT
- Game weather: Sunny
- Game attendance: 36,801
- Referee: Christian Watson
- TV announcers (FS1): Dan Hellie (play-by-play) and Petros Papadakis (analyst)

Game information

First quarter

- (7:35) FRES – Dylan Lynch 36-yard field goal (Drive: 14 plays, 57 yards, 7:25; Fresno State 3–0)
- (4:52) FRES – Rayshon Luke 17-yard run, Dylan Lynch kick (Drive: 3 plays, 20 yards, 0:49; Fresno State 10–0)
- (1:17) GASO – Camden Brown 18-yard pass from JC French IV, Tripp Bryant kick (Drive: 8 plays, 75 yards, 3:35; Fresno State 10–7)

Second quarter

- (11:33) GASO – River Helms 4-yard pass from JC French IV, Tripp Bryant kick (Drive: 9 plays, 57 yards, 3:50; Georgia Southern 14–10)
- (0:00) FRES – Dylan Lynch 26-yard field goal (Drive: 9 plays, 45 yards, 4:02; Georgia Southern 14–13)

Third quarter

- (8:36) FRES – Bryson Donelson 6-yard run, Josiah Freeman two-point run (Drive: 8 plays, 55 yards, 4:24; Fresno State 21–14)
- (1:50) FRES – Rayshon Luke 12-yard run, Dylan Lynch kick (Drive: 9 plays, 56 yards, 4:47; Fresno State 28–14)

Fourth quarter

- (10:02) FRES – Brandon Ramirez 3-yard run, Dylan Lynch kick (Drive: 8 plays, 90 yards, 4:46; Fresno State 35–14)
- (6:21) FRES – Rayshon Luke 29-yard run, Dylan Lynch kick (Drive: 5 plays, 71 yards, 3:93; Fresno State 42–14)

Statistics	GASO	FRES
First downs	13	29
Plays–yards	49–242	72–527
Rushes–yards	21–84	45–351
Passing yards	158	176
Passing: Comp–Att–Int	17–28–1	20–27–2
Turnovers	1	3
Time of possession	21:59	38:01

Team	Category	Player	Statistics
Georgia Southern	Passing	JC French IV	17/28, 158 yards, 2 TD, INT
Georgia Southern	Rushing	OJ Arnold	9 carries, 41 yards
Georgia Southern	Receiving	Camden Brown	4 receptions 55 yards, TD
Fresno State	Passing	E. J. Warner	20/27, 176 yards, 2 INT
Fresno State	Rushing	Bryson Donelson	23 carries, 167 yards, TD
Fresno State	Receiving	Jayon Farrar	3 receptions, 33 yards

=== at USC ===
Georgia Southern Eagles (0–1) at USC Trojans (1–0) – Game summary

Quarter	1	2	3	4	Total
Eagles	6	7	7	0	20
Trojans	21	10	14	14	59

at Los Angeles Memorial Coliseum • Los Angeles, CA

- Date: September 6
- Game time: 7:30 PM EDT
- Game weather: Sunny • Temperature: 83 °F (28 °C) • Wind: W at 8 miles per hour (13 km/h)
- Game attendance: 66,514
- Referee: Jason Nickleby
- TV announcers (FS1): Connor Onion (play-by-play) and Mark Helfrich (analyst)

Game information

First quarter

- (13:42) GASO – Camden Brown 32-yard pass from Weston Bryan (Drive: 3 plays, 41 yards, 0:41; GASO 6–0)
- (13:01) USC – Ja'Kobi Lane 12-yard pass from Jayden Maiava, Ryon Sayeri kick (Drive: 8 plays, 75 yards, 4:11; USC 7–6)
- (7:41) USC – Makai Lemon 62-yard pass from Jayden Maiava, Ryon Sayeri kick (Drive: 2 plays, 800 yards, 0:48; USC 14–6)
- (3:17) USC – Makai Lemon 74-yard pass from Jayden Maiava, Ryan Sayeri kick (Drive: 3 plays, 85 yards, 1:03; USC 21–6)

Second quarter

- (11:32) GASO – Camden Brown 24-yard pass from JC French IV, Tripp Bryant kick (Drive: 7 plays, 75 yards, 3:19; USC 21–13)
- (8:52) USC – Ryon Sayeri 26-yard field goal (Drive: 7 plays, 66 yards, 2:34; USC 24–13)
- (5:26) USC – Walker Lyons 14-yard pass from Jayden Maiava, Ryon Sayeri kick (Drive: 4 plays, 77 yards, 1:55; USC 31–13)

Third quarter

- (10:49) USC – Waymond Jones 36-yard run, Ryon Sayeri kick (Drive: 6 plays, 71 yards, 2:23; USC 38–13)
- (7:58) USC – Eli Sanders 1-yard run, Ryon Sayeri kick (Drive: 4 plays, 72 yards, 1:57; USC 45-13)
- (1:34) GASO – Dalen Cobb 13-yard pass from JC French IV, Tripp Bryant kick (Drive: 15 plays, 71 yards, 6:18; USC 45–20)

Fourth quarter

- (12:55) USC – Eli Sanders 5-yard run, Ryon Sayeri kick (Drive: 7 plays, 79 yards, 3:34; USC 52–20)
- (10:24) USC – King Miller 41-yard run, Ryon Sayeri kick (Drive: 3 plays, 64 yards, 1:40; USC 59–20)

Statistics	GASO	USC
First downs	26	28
Plays–yards	78–377	63–755
Rushes–yards	33–142	33–309
Passing yards	235	446
Passing: comp–att–int	24–45–1	20–30–0
Turnovers	1	1
Time of possession	29:48	30:12

Team	Category	Player	Statistics
Georgia Southern	Passing	JC French IV	19/35, 179 yards, 2 TD, INT
Georgia Southern	Rushing	Jamarian Samuel	4 carries, 58 yards
Georgia Southern	Receiving	Camden Brown	3 receptions, 75 yards, 2 TD
USC	Passing	Jayden Maiava	16/24, 412 yards, 4 TD
USC	Rushing	Waymond Jordan	16 carries, 167 yards, TD
USC	Receiving	Makai Lemon	4 receptions, 158 yards, 2 TD

=== Jacksonville State ===
Jacksonville State Gamecocks (1–1) at Georgia Southern Eagles (0–2) – Game summary

Quarter	1	2	3	4	Total
Gamecocks	14	10	10	0	34
Eagles	17	14	0	10	41

at Paulson Stadium • Statesboro, GA

- Date: September 13
- Game time: 7:00 PM EDT
- Game weather: Sunny • Temperature: 78 °F (26 °C)
- Game attendance: 24,585
- Referee: Trennis Livingston
- TV announcers (ESPN+): Danny Waugh (play-by-play), Jayson Foster (analyst) and Whitney Haworth

Game information

First quarter

- (11:04) GASO – JC French IV 2-yard run, Tripp Bryant kick (Drive: 9 plays, 60 yards, 3:48; Georgia Southern 7–0)
- (6:34) JVST - Gavin Wimsatt 10-yard run, Garrison Rippa kick (Drive: 10 plays, 75 yards, 4:30; Tied 7-7)
- (6:22) GASO - Dalen Cobb 95-yard kickoff return, Tripp Bryant kick (Georgia Southern 14-7)
- (3:42) JVST - Brock Rechsteiner 56-yard pass from Gavin Wimsett, Garrison Rippa kick (Drive: 6 plays, 75 yards, 2:40; Tied 14-14)
- (1:44) GASO - Tripp Bryant 37-yard field goal (Drive: 7 plays, 15 yards, 1:49; Georgia Southern 17-14)

Second quarter

- (14:56) GASO - Camden Brown 18-yard pass from JC French IV, Tripp Bryant kick (Drive: 5 plays, 39 yards, 1:41; Georgia Southern 24-14)
- (10:38) JVST - Garrison Rippa 30-yard field goal (Drive: 9 plays, 62 yards, 4:18; Georgia Southern 24-17)
- (5:54) GASO - OJ Arnold 32-yard run, Tripp Bryant kick (Drive: 9 plays, 75 yards, 4:44; Georgia Southern 31-17)
- (0:24) JVST - Gavin Wimsatt 6-yard run, Garrison Rippa kick (Drive: 11 plays, 66 yards, 2:33; Georgia Southern 31-24')

Third quarter

- (9:34) JVST - Garrison Rippa 33-yard field goal (Drive: 11 plays, 49 yards, 5:26; Georgia Southern 31-27)
- (0:22) JVST - Brock Rechsteiner 13-yard run, Garrison Rippa kick (Drive: 7 plays, 42 yards, 2:55; Jacksonville State 34-31)

Fourth quarter

- (11:19) GASO - Tripp Bryant 43-yard field goal (Drive: 11 plays, 51 yards, 3:57; Tied 34-34)
- (6:23) GASO - OJ Arnold 6-yard run, Tripp Bryant kick (Drive: 6 plays, 65 yards, 3:33; Georgia Southern 41-34')

Statistics	JVST	GASO
First downs	22	24
Plays–yards	67–396	66–410
Rushes–yards	42–213	42–219
Passing yards	183	191
Passing: Comp–Att–Int	17–25–1	16–24–0
Turnovers	1	1
Time of possession	30:30	29:30

Team	Category	Player	Statistics
Jacksonville State	Passing	Gavin Wimsatt	16/24, 178 yards, TD, INT
Jacksonville State	Rushing	Cam Cook	21 carries, 120 yards
Jacksonville State	Receiving	Brock Rechsteiner	4 receptions, 69 yards, TD
Georgia Southern	Passing	JC French IV	16/24, 191 yards, TD
Georgia Southern	Rushing	OJ Arnold	16 carries, 128 yards, 2 TDs
Georgia Southern	Receiving	Dalen Cobb	6 receptions, 70 yards

=== Maine (FCS) ===
Maine Black Bears (FCS) (0–3) at Georgia Southern Eagles (1–2) – Game summary

Quarter	1	2	3	4	Total
Black Bears (FCS)	7	7	3	0	17
Eagles	7	10	14	14	45

at Paulson Stadium • Statesboro, GA

- Date: September 20
- Game time: 7:00 PM EDT
- Game weather: Sunny • Temperature: 83 °F (28 °C)
- Game attendance: 23,217
- Referee: Scott Broadway
- TV announcers (ESPN+): Danny Waugh (play-by-play), Jayson Foster (analyst) and Skye Taylor (sideline)

Game information

First quarter

- (11:28) ME – Carter Peevy 27-yard run, Samuel Tremblay kick (Drive: 5 plays, 70 yards, 2:28; Maine 7–0)
- (2:11) GASO – OJ Arnold 3-yard run, Tripp Bryant kick (Drive: 14 plays, 68 yards, 6:34; Tied 7–7)

Second quarter

- (11:24) GASO – Tripp Bryant 22-yard field goal (Drive: 11 plays, 69 yards, 3:22; Georgia Southern 10–7)
- (5:56) GASO – Dalen Cobb 3-yard run, Tripp Bryant kick (Drive: 7 plays, 76 yards, 3:13; Georgia Southern 17–7)
- (1:07) ME – Devin Vaught 76-yard interception return, Samuel Tremblay kick (Drive: 5 plays, 34 yards, 0:54; Georgia Southern 17–14)

Third quarter

- (10:43) GASO – Weston Bryan 1-yard run, Tripp Bryant kick (Drive: 4 plays, 61 yards, 1:43; Georgia Southern 24–14)
- (5:59) ME – Samuel Tremblay 33-yard field goal (Drive: 11 plays, 59 yards, 4:44; Georgia Southern 24–17)
- (3:26) GASO – Dalen Cobb 25-yard pass from JC French IV, Tripp Bryant kick (Drive: 5 plays, 74 yards, 2:26; Georgia Southern 31–17)

Fourth quarter

- (14:01) GASO – Camden Brown 12-yard pass from OJ Arnold, Tripp Bryant kick (Drive: 1 play, 12 yards, 0:05; Georgia Southern 38–17)
- (8:50) GASO – Jamarian Samuel 1-yard run, Tripp Bryant kick (Drive: 9 plays, 42 yards, 3:43; Georgia Southern 45–17)

Statistics	ME	GASO
First downs	17	28
Plays–yards	64–248	77–516
Rushes–yards	30–109	40–206
Passing yards	139	310
Passing: Comp–Att–Int	19-34-1	22-37-1
Turnovers	2	2
Time of possession	31:30	28:30

Team	Category	Player	Statistics
Maine	Passing	Carter Peevy	13/22, 88 yards
Maine	Rushing	Sincere Baines	7 carries, 41 yards
Maine	Receiving	Rashawn Marshall	4 receptions, 25 yards
Georgia Southern	Passing	JC French IV	19/31, 253 yards, TD, INT
Georgia Southern	Rushing	OJ Arnold	13 carries, 85 yards, TD
Georgia Southern	Receiving	Camden Brown	6 receptions, 118 yards, TD

=== at James Madison ===
Georgia Southern Eagles (2–2) at James Madison Dukes (2–1) – Game summary

Quarter	1	2	3	4	Total
Eagles	0	3	7	0	10
Dukes	7	14	14	0	35

at Bridgeforth Stadium • Harrisonburg, VA

- Date: September 27
- Game time: 1:30 p.m. EDT
- Game weather: Rain • Temperature: 70 °F (21 °C) • Wind: 5 mph
- Game attendance: 25,029
- Referee: Jeremy Parker
- TV announcers (ESPN+): Curt Dudley (play-by-play), Delvin Joyce (analyst) and David Hulvey (sideline)

Game information

First quarter

- (7:23) JMU - Wayne Knight 40-yard run, Morgan Suarez kick (Drive: 5 plays, 72 yards, 7:23; James Madison 7-0)

Second quarter

- (9:15) JMU - Alonza Barnett III 4-yard run, Morgan Suarez kick (Drive: 9 plays, 57 yards, 4:08; James Madison 14-0)
- (4:15) GASO - Tripp Bryant 26-yard field goal (Drive: 11 plays, 68 yards, 5:00; James Madison 14-3)
- (4:01) JMU - Curtis Harris-Lopez 88-yard kickoff return, Morgan Suarez kick (James Madison 21-3)

Third quarter

- (8:59) JMU - Lacota Dippre 17-yard pass from Alonza Barnett III, Morgan Suarez kick (Drive: 10 plays, 67 yards, 5:51; James Madison 28-3)
- (1:57) JMU - Jordan Fuller 26-yard run, Morgan Suarez kick (Drive: 8 plays, 80 yards, 4:24; James Madison 35-3)
- (0:40) GASO - Taylor Bradshaw 12-yard pass from JC French IV, Tripp Bryant kick (Drive: 3 plays, 75 yards, 1:17; James Madison 35-10)

Fourth quarter

- No scoring plays.

Statistics	GASO	JMU
First downs	10	29
Plays–yards	50–192	75–479
Rushes–yards	26–27	53–331
Passing yards	165	148
Passing: Comp–Att–Int	14–24–0	11–22–0
Turnovers	0	0
Time of possession	24:10	35:50

Team	Category	Player	Statistics
Georgia Southern	Passing	JC French IV	14/24, 165 yards, TD
Georgia Southern	Rushing	David Mbadinga	3 carries, 14 yards
Georgia Southern	Receiving	Camden Brown	5 reception, 111 yards
James Madison	Passing	Alonza Barnett III	11/22, 148 yards, TD
James Madison	Rushing	Wayne Knight	19 carries, 151 yards, TD
James Madison	Receiving	Lacota Dippre	2 receptions, 42 yards, TD

=== Southern Miss ===
Southern Miss Golden Eagles (3–2) at Georgia Southern Eagles (2–3) – Game summary

Quarter	1	2	3	4	Total
Golden Eagles	7	21	7	3	38
Eagles	7	0	14	14	35

at Paulson Stadium • Statesboro, GA

- Date: October 9, 2025
- Game time: 8:00 p.m. EDT
- Game weather: Sunny • Temperature: 67 °F (19 °C)
- Game attendance: 20,032
- Referee: Ted Pitts
- TV announcers (ESPN2): Jay Alter (play-by-play) and Rocky Boiman (analyst)

Game information

First quarter

- (8:23) GASO – David Mbadinga 2-yard run, Tripp Bryant kick (Drive: 7 plays, 48 yards, 2:53; Georgia Southern 7–0)
- (4:42) USM – Tychaun Chapman 50-yard pass from Braylon Braxton, Creighton Wilbanks kick (Drive: 9 plays, 89 yards, 3:32; Tied 7–7)

Second quarter

- (14:56) USM – Jeffery Pittman 2-yard run, Creighton Wilbanks kick (Drive: 5 plays, 45 yards, 1:22; Southern Miss 14–7)
- (5:06) USM – Carl Chester 30-yard pass from Braylon Braxton, Creighton Wilbanks kick (Drive: 4 plays, 44 yards, 1:54; Southern Miss 21–7)
- (1:18) USM – Jeffery Pittman 2-yard run, Creighton Wilbanks kick (Drive: 9 plays, 75 yards, 2:07; Southern Miss 28–7)

Third quarter

- (7:03) GASO – JC French IV 5-yard run, Tripp Bryant kick (Drive: 12 plays, 87 yards, 5:45; Southern Miss 28–14)
- (4:24) USM – Matt Jones 3-yard run, Creighton Wilbanks kick (Drive: 8 plays, 75 yards, 2:39; Southern Miss 35–14)
- (1:19) GASO – Marcus Sanders Jr. 39-yard pass from JC French IV, Tripp Bryant kick (Drive: 8 plays, 75 yards, 3:05; Southern Miss 35–21)

Fourth quarter

- (10:24) USM – Creighton Wilbanks 42-yard field goal (Drive: 14 plays, 51 yards, 5:55; Southern Miss 38–21)
- (6:20) GASO – Camden Brown 26-yard pass from JC French IV, Tripp Bryant kick (Drive: 3 plays, 29 yards, 0:42; Southern Miss 38–28)
- (2:14) GASO – JC French IV 2-yard run, Tripp Bryant kick (Drive: 12 plays, 61 yards, 3:20; Southern Miss 38–35)

Statistics	USM	GASO
First downs	25	24
Plays–yards	76–421	77–395
Rushes–yards	48–184	34–82
Passing yards	237	313
Passing: Comp–Att–Int	19–28–0	24–43–3
Turnovers	1	3
Time of possession	30:57	29:03

Team	Category	Player	Statistics
Southern Miss	Passing	Braylon Braxton	19/28, 237 yards, 2 TD
Southern Miss	Rushing	Jeffery Pittman	31 carries, 140 yards, 2 TD
Southern Miss	Receiving	Elijah Metcalf	4 receptions, 62 yards
Georgia Southern	Passing	JC French IV	24/43, 313 yards, 2 TD, 3 INT
Georgia Southern	Rushing	OJ Arnold	13 carries, 56 yards
Georgia Southern	Receiving	Camden Brown	12 receptions, 158 yards, TD

=== Georgia State (Modern Day Hate) ===
Georgia State Panthers (1–5) at Georgia Southern Eagles (2–4) – Game summary

Quarter	1	2	3	4	Total
Panthers	7	10	7	0	24
Eagles	3	10	7	21	41

at Paulson Stadium • Statesboro, GA

- Date: October 18
- Game time: 7:00 p.m. EDT
- Game weather: Sunny • Temperature: 71 °F (22 °C)
- Game attendance: 25,428
- Referee: Trennis Livingston
- TV announcers (ESPN+): Danny Waugh (play-by-play), Jayson Foster (analyst) and Whitney Haworth (sideline)

Game information

First quarter

- (12:19) GASO – Tripp Bryant 38-yard field goal (Drive: 10 plays, 47 yards, 2:36; Georgia Southern 3–0)
- (4:52) GAST – Cameran Brown 15-yard run, Liam Rickman kick (Drive: 13 plays, 88 yards, 7:21; Georgia State 7–3)

Second quarter

- (13:37) GASO – Camden Brown 20-yard pass from JC French IV, Tripp Bryant kick (Drive: 14 plays, 70 yards, 6:15; Georgia Southern 10–7)
- (7:55) GAST – Liam Rickman 31-yard field goal (Drive: 12 plays, 62 yards, 5:42; Tied 10–10)
- (0:46) GAST – Ted Hurst 5-yard pass from Cameran Brown, Liam Rickman kick (Drive: 10 plays, 90 yards, 3:28; Georgia State 17–10)
- (0:00) GASO – Tripp Bryant 46-yard field goal (Drive: 7 plays, 47 yards, 0:46; Georgia State 17–13)

Third quarter

- (8:08) GASO – JC French IV 4-yard run, Tripp Bryant kick (Drive: 7 plays, 43 yards, 3:01; Georgia Southern 20–17)
- (3:02) GAST – Rashad Amos 3-yard run, Liam Rickman kick (Drive: 10 plays, 83 yards, 5:01; Georgia State 24–20)

Fourth quarter

- (14:58) GASO – Weston Bryant 1-yard run, Tripp Bryant kick (Drive: 8 plays, 75 yards, 3:04; Georgia Southern 27–24)
- (9:50) GASO – Camden Brown 16-yard pass from JC French IV, Tripp Bryant kick (Drive: 7 plays, 66 yards, 3:29; Georgia Southern 34–24)
- (4:33) GASO – Dalen Cobb 5-yard pass from JC French IV, Tripp Bryant kick (Drive: 8 plays, 49 yards, 3:53; Georgia Southern 41–24)

Statistics	GAST	GASO
First downs	27	25
Plays–yards	72–444	69–420
Rushes–yards	34–164	42–208
Passing yards	280	212
Passing: Comp–Att–Int	29–38–0	18–27–0
Turnovers	1	0
Time of possession	32:20	27:40

Team	Category	Player	Statistics
Georgia State	Passing	Cameran Brown	29/38, 280 yards, TD
Georgia State	Rushing	Cameran Brown	15 carries, 120 yards, TD
Georgia State	Receiving	Javon Robinson	7 receptions, 71 yards
Georgia Southern	Passing	JC French IV	17/25, 210 yards, 3 TD
Georgia Southern	Rushing	JC French IV	12 carries, 85 yards, TD
Georgia Southern	Receiving	OJ Arnold	4 receptions, 85 yards

=== at Arkansas State ===
Georgia Southern Eagles (3–4) at Arkansas State Red Wolves (3–4) – Game summary

Quarter	1	2	3	4	Total
Eagles	14	7	0	3	24
Red Wolves	7	10	7	10	34

at Centennial Bank Stadium • Jonesboro, AR

- Date: October 25
- Game time: 7:00 p.m. EDT
- Game weather: Cloudy • Temperature: 68 °F (20 °C) • Wind: 7 mph
- Game attendance: 16,341
- Referee: Steven Robinson
- TV announcers (ESPN+): Graham Doty (play-by-play), Pete Cordelli (analyst) and Darrell Greene (sideline)

Game information

First quarter

- (12:08) GASO - Camden Brown 24-yard pass from JC French IV, Tripp Bryant kick (Drive: 7 plays, 65 yards, 2:47; Georgia Southern 7-0)
- (4:10) GASO - Marcus Sanders Jr. 18-yard pass from JC French IV, Tripp Bryant kick (Drive: 10 plays, 98 yards, 4:03; Georgia Southern 14-0)
- (2:29) ARST - Kenyon Clay 1-yard run, Clune Van Andel kick (Drive: 5 plays, 75 yards, 1:41; Georgia Southern 14-7)

Second quarter

- (13:24) ARST - Clune Van Andel 24-yard field goal (Drive: 8 plays, 39 yards, 2;10; Georgia Southern 14-10)
- (6:59) GASO - JC French IV 5-yard pass, Tripp Bryant kick (Drive: 5 plays, 32 yards, 2:12; Georgia Southern 21-10)
- (0:09) ARST - Jaylen Raynor 2-yard run, Clune Van Andel kick (Drive: 14 plays, 91 yards, 3:25; Georgia Southern 21-17)

Third quarter

- (9:38) ARST - Jaylen Raynor 8-yard run, Clune Van Andel kick (Drive: 13 plays, 77 yards, 5:18; Arkansas State 24-21)

Fourth quarter

- (9:47) ARST - Jaylen Raynor 2-yard run, Clune Van Andel kick (Drive: 11 plays, 78 yards, 3:18; Arkansas State 31-21)
- (1:56) GASO - Tripp Bryant 21-yard field goal (Drive: 14 plays, 81 yards, 7:46; Arkansas State 31-24)
- (0:41) ARST - Clune Van Andel 27-yard field goal (Drive: 5 plays, 36 yards, 1:13; Arkansas State 34-24)

Statistics	GASO	ARST
First downs	22	29
Plays–yards	66–336	85–482
Rushes–yards	41–128	48–266
Passing yards	208	216
Passing: Comp–Att–Int	18-25-0	24-37-1
Turnovers	0	2
Time of possession	31:43	28:17

Team	Category	Player	Statistics
Georgia Southern	Passing	JC French IV	18/24, 208 yards, 2 TD
Georgia Southern	Rushing	OJ Arnold	14 carries, 73 yards
Georgia Southern	Receiving	Camden Brown	5 receptions, 44 yards, TD
Arkansas State	Passing	Jaylen Raynor	24/37, 216 yards, INT
Arkansas State	Rushing	Kenyon Clay	17 carries, 124 yards, TD
Arkansas State	Receiving	Chauncy Cobb	12 receptions, 81 yards

=== at Appalachian State (Deeper Than Hate) ===
Georgia Southern Eagles (3–5) at Appalachian State Mountaineers (4–4) – Game summary

Quarter	1	2	3	4	Total
Eagles	9	10	3	3	25
Mountaineers	0	3	6	14	23

at Kidd Brewer Stadium • Boone, NC

- Date: November 6
- Game time: 7:30 p.m. EST
- Game weather: Clear • Temperature: 46 °F (8 °C) • Wind: SE 3 mph
- Game attendance: 31,876
- Referee: Jeremy Parker
- TV announcers (ESPN2): Courtney Lyle (play-by-play) and Rene Ingoglia (analyst)

Game information

First quarter

- (14:16) GASO – Marcus Sanders Jr. 47-yard pass from JC French IV (Drive: 3 plays, 75 yards, 0:44; Georgia Southern 6–0)
- (4:11) GASO – Tripp Bryant 21-yard field goal (Drive: 10 plays, 61 yards, 5:02; Georgia Southern 9–0)

Second quarter

- (7:31) GASO – JC French IV 3-yard run, Tripp Bryant kick (Drive: 10 plays, 59 yards, 4:19; Georgia Southern 16–0)
- (1:14) GASO – Tripp Bryant 26-yard field goal (Drive: 13 plays, 65 yards, 3:44; Georgia Southern 19–0)
- (0:00) APP – Dominic De Freitas 36-yard field goal (Drive: 9 plays, 57 yards, 1:14; Georgia Southern 19–3)

Third quarter

- (9:20) GASO – Tripp Bryant 23-yard field goal (Drive: 11 plays, 67 yards, 4:32; Georgia Southern 22–3)
- (4:51) APP – David Larkins 1-yard pass from AJ Swann (Drive: 11 plays, 78 yards, 4:23; Georgia Southern 22–9)

Fourth quarter

- (13:50) APP – Jaquari Lewis 27-yard run, Dominic De Freitas kick (Drive: 10 plays, 69 yards, 3:57; Georgia Southern 22–16)
- (9:05) GASO – Tripp Bryant 24-yard field goal (Drive: 9 plays, 65 yards, 4:40; Georgia Southern 25–16)
- (1:56) APP – Jaden Barnes 16-yard pass from AJ Swann, Dominic De Freitas kick (Drive: 11 plays, 66 yards, 3:28; Georgia Southern 25–23)

Statistics	GASO	APP
First downs	25	23
Plays–yards	75–494	74–425
Rushes–yards	38–142	23–77
Passing yards	352	348
Passing: Comp–Att–Int	25–37–0	34–51–1
Turnovers	0	1
Time of possession	32:20	27:39

Team	Category	Player	Statistics
Georgia Southern	Passing	JC French IV	25/37, 352 yards, TD
Georgia Southern	Rushing	OJ Arnold	20 carries, 105 yards
Georgia Southern	Receiving	Marcus Sanders Jr.	6 receptions, 127 yards, TD
Appalachian State	Passing	AJ Swann	34/51, 348 yards, 2 TD, INT
Appalachian State	Rushing	Jaquari Lewis	6 carries, 50 yards, TD
Appalachian State	Receiving	Jaden Barnes	13 receptions, 160 yards, TD

=== Coastal Carolina ===
Coastal Carolina Chanticleers (6–3) at Georgia Southern Eagles (4–5) – Game summary

Quarter	1	2	3	4	Total
Chanticleers	17	10	6	7	40
Eagles	21	14	7	3	45

at Paulson Stadium • Statesboro, GA

- Date: November 15
- Game time: 6:00 p.m. EST
- Game weather: Sunny • Temperature: 65 °F (18 °C)
- Game attendance: 22,738
- Referee: Trennis Livingston
- TV announcers (ESPN+): Danny Waugh (play-by-play), Jayson Foster (analyst) and Skye Taylor (sideline)

Game information

First quarter

- (11:04) GASO - OJ Arnold 1-yard run, Tripp Bryant kick (Drive: 5 plays, 92 yards, 1:49; Georgia Southern 7-0)
- (10:52) CCU - Jameson Tucker 75-yard pass from Bryson Graves, Kian Afrookhteh kick (Drive: 1 play, 75 yards, 0:12; Tied 7-7)
- (8:38) GASO - Camden Brown 4-yard pass from Weston Bryan, Tripp Bryant kick (Drive: 5 plays, 72 yards, 2:08; Georgia Southern 14-7)
- (4:14) CCU - Samari Collier 5-yard run, Kian Afrookhteh kick (Drive: 4 plays, 38 yards, 1:42; Tied 14-14)
- (3:58) GASO - OJ Arnold 62-yard run, Tripp Bryant kick (Drive: 1 play, 62 yards, 0:08; Georgia Southern 21-14)
- (0:47) CCU - Kian Afrookhteh 41-yard field goal (Drive: 8 plays, 67 yards, 3:06; Georgia Southern 21-17)

Second quarter

- (12:43) GASO - OJ Arnold 41-yard pass from JC French IV, Tripp Bryant kick (Drive: 6 plays, 65 yards, 2:55; Georgia Southern 28-17)
- (7:39) CCU - Philippe Laforge 51-yard field goal (Drive: 13 plays, 45 yards, 4:57; Georgia Southern 28-20)
- (3:34) GASO - Camden Brown 7-yard pass from JC French IV, Tripp Bryant kick (Drive: 2 plays, 6 yards, 0:45; Georgia Southern 35-20)
- (3:24) CCU - Malcolm Gillie 96-yard kickoff return, Kian Afrookhteh kick (Drive: 0 plays, 0 yards, 0:00; Georgia Southern 35-27)

Third quarter

- (11:24) CCU - Karmello English 12-yard pass from Robby Washington, two-point pass conversion field (Drive: 9 plays, 75 yards, 3:36; Georgia Southern 35-33)
- (10:52) GASO - Camden Brown 73-yard pass from OJ Arnold, Tripp Bryant kick (Drive: 2 plays, 75 yards, 0:32; Georgia Southern 42-33)

Fourth quarter

- (14:57) GASO - Tripp Bryant 29-yard field goal (Drive: 8 plays, 70 yards, 2:40; Georgia Southern 45-33)
- (11:32) CCU - Dominic Knicely 16-yard run, Kian Afrookhteh kick (Drive: 10 plays, 75 yards, 3:18; Georgia Southern 45-40)

Statistics	CCU	GASO
First downs	24	24
Total yards	74–482	74–653
Rushing yards	38–204	40–312
Passing yards	278	341
Passing: Comp–Att–Int	19-36-1	23-34-1
Turnovers	1	2
Time of possession	28:39	31:21

Team	Category	Player	Statistics
Coastal Carolina	Passing	Tad Hudson	15/28, 173 yards, INT
Coastal Carolina	Rushing	Samari Collier	6 carries, 69 yards, TD
Coastal Carolina	Receiving	Jameson Tucker	4 receptions, 107 yards, TD
Georgia Southern	Passing	JC French IV	22/33, 264 yards, 2 TD, INT
Georgia Southern	Rushing	OJ Arnold	21 carries, 267 yards, 2 TD
Georgia Southern	Receiving	Camden Brown	5 receptions, 133 yards, 3 TD

=== Old Dominion ===
Old Dominion Monarchs (7–3) at Georgia Southern Eagles (5–5) – Game summary

Quarter	1	2	3	4	Total
Monarchs	14	17	14	0	45
Eagles	0	0	3	7	10

at Paulson Stadium • Statesboro, GA

- Date: November 22
- Game time: 1:00 p.m. EST
- Game weather: Sunny • Temperature: 77 °F (25 °C)
- Game attendance: 19,247
- Referee: Scott Broadway
- TV announcers (ESPN+): Danny Waugh (play-by-play), Jayson Foster (analyst) and Whitney Haworth (sideline)

Game information

First quarter

- (13:10) ODU - Ke'Travion Hargrove 1-yard run, Nathanial Eichner kick (Drive: 3 plays, 27 yards, 1:13; Old Dominion 7-0)
- (7:15) ODU - Devin Roche 21-yard run, Nathanial Eichner kick (Drive: 7 plays, 66 yards, 3:06; Old Dominion 14-0)

Second quarter

- (14:57) ODU - Nathanial Eichner 28-yard field goal (Drive: 11 plays, 36 yards, 3:43; Old Dominion 17-0)
- (9:57) ODU - Jailen Butler 16-yard pass from Colton Joseph, Nathanial Eichner kick (Drive: 7 plays, 70 yards, 3:13; Old Dominion 24-0)
- (3:53) ODU - Ke'Travion Hargrove 2-yard run, Nathanial Eichner kick (Drive: 8 plays, 80 yards, 3:38; Old Dominion 31-0)

Third quarter

- (9:56) ODU - Ke'Travion Hargrove 12-yard run, Nathanial Eichner kick (Drive: 10 plays, 75 yards, 5:04; Old Dominion 38-0)
- (6:53) GASO - Tripp Bryant 26-yard field goal (Drive: 10 plays, 70 yards, 2:57; Old Dominion 38-3)
- (2:02) ODU - Colton Joseph 20-yard run, Nathanial Eichner kick (Drive: 10 plays, 75 yards, 4:51; Old Dominion 45-3)

Fourth quarter

- (0:29) GASO - Dylan Gary 11-yard pass from Turner Helton, Tripp Bryant kick (Drive: 5 plays, 22 yards, 2:00; Old Dominion 45-10)

Statistics	ODU	GASO
First downs	32	13
Plays–yards	80–551	61–249
Rushes–yards	57–376	19–49
Passing yards	175	200
Passing: Comp–Att–Int	14–23–0	27–42–1
Turnovers	1	1
Time of possession	34:35	24:25

Team	Category	Player	Statistics
Old Dominion	Passing	Colton Joseph	12/18, 140 yards, TD
Old Dominion	Rushing	Colton Joseph	20 carries, 189 yards, TD
Old Dominion	Receiving	Ja'Cory Thomas	2 receptions, 51 yards
Georgia Southern	Passing	JC French IV	16/24, 147 yards, INT
Georgia Southern	Rushing	Taeo Todd	7 carries, 25 yards
Georgia Southern	Receiving	Marcus Sanders Jr.	4 receptions, 88 yards

=== at Marshall ===
Georgia Southern Eagles (5–6) at Marshall Thundering Herd (5–6) – Game summary

Quarter	1	2	3	4	Total
Eagles	14	0	10	0	24
Thundering Herd	3	3	6	7	19

at Joan C. Edwards Stadium • Huntington, WV

- Date: November 29
- Game time: 1:30 p.m. EST
- Game weather: Sunny
- Game attendance: 21,524
- Referee: Jeremy Parker
- TV announcers (ESPN+): Keith Morehouse (play-by-play), Mark Martin (analyst) and Ben Westfall (sideline)

Game information

First quarter

- (12:06) MRSH - Lorcan Quinn 42-yard field goal (Drive: 7 plays, 36 yards, 2:43; Marshall 3-0)
- (7:53) GASO - Marcus Sanders Jr. 33-yard pass from Weston Bryan, Tripp Bryant kick (Drive: 9 plays, 75 yards, 4:13; Georgia Southern 7-3)
- (0:49) GASO - Camden Brown 14-yard pass from JC French IV, Tripp Bryant kick (Drive: 13 plays, 81 yards, 5:51; Georgia Southern 14-3)

Second quarter

- (1:52) MRSH - Lorcan Quinn 24-yard field goal (Drive: 11 plays, 70 yards, 3:46; Georgia Southern 14-6)

Third quarter

- (9:41) GASO - Camden Brown 12-yard pass from JC French IV, Tripp Bryant kick (Drive: 10 plays, 76 yards, 5:11; Georgia Southern 21-6)
- (3:49) GASO - Tripp Bryant 24-yard field goal (Drive: 10 plays, 82 yards, 4:27; Georgia Southern 24-6)
- (2:19) MRSH - Antwan Roberts 17-yard run, two-point pass conversion failed (Drive: 4 plays, 60 yards, 1:25; Georgia Southern 24-12)

Fourth quarter

- (2:19) MRSH - Adrian Norton 41-yard pass from Zion Turner, Lorcan Quinn kick (Drive: 5 plays, 72 yards, 1:36; Georgia Southern 24-19)

Statistics	GASO	MRSH
First downs	31	18
Plays–yards	87–528	51–372
Rushes–yards	48–173	16–64
Passing yards	355	308
Passing: Comp–Att–Int	26-39-0	22-35-1
Turnovers	1	1
Time of possession	41:38	18:22

Team	Category	Player	Statistics
Georgia Southern	Passing	JC French IV	24/37, 313 yards, 2 TD
Georgia Southern	Rushing	Taeo Todd	13 carries, 60 yards
Georgia Southern	Receiving	Camden Brown	9 receptions, 157 yards, 2 TD
Marshall	Passing	Zion Turner	13/19, 172 yards, TD
Marshall	Rushing	Antwan Roberts	1 carry, 17 yards, TD
Marshall	Receiving	Adrian Norton	8 receptions, 160 yards, TD

=== vs. Appalachian State (Birmingham Bowl) ===
2025 JLab Birmingham Bowl
Georgia Southern Eagles (6–6) vs. Appalachian State Mountaineers (5–7) – Game summary

Quarter	1	2	3	4	Total
Eagles	7	6	13	3	29
Mountaineers	0	7	3	0	10

at Protective Stadium • Birmingham, AL

- Date: December 29
- Game time: 2:00 p.m. EST
- Game weather: Sunny • Temperature: 44 °F (7 °C) • Wind: NNW at 13 mph (21 km/h)
- Game attendance: 12,092
- Referee: Rory Bernard (Conference USA)
- TV announcers (ESPN): Taylor Zarzour (play-by-play), Matt Stinchcomb (analyst) and Alyssa Lang (sideline)

Game information

First quarter

- GASO – Terrance Gibbs 1-yard run (Tripp Bryant kick), 8:23. Eagles 7–0. Drive: 11 plays, 66 yards, 5:14.

Second quarter

- GASO – Tripp Bryant 23-yard field goal, 9:00. Eagles 10–0. Drive: 11 plays, 73 yards, 5:20.
- APP – Matthew Wilson 6-yard run (Dominic De Freitas kick), 1:51. Eagles 10–7. Drive: 7 plays, 53 yards, 2:43.
- GASO – Tripp Bryant 36-yard field goal, 0:01. Eagles 13–7. Drive: 10 plays, 57 yards, 1:51.

Third quarter

- GASO – Weston Bryan 3-yard run (pass failed), 13:34. Eagles 19–7. Drive: 3 plays, 73 yards, 1:22.
- GASO – Marcus Sanders Jr. 32-yard pass from JC French IV (Tripp Bryant kick), 8:50. Eagles 26–7. Drive: 5 plays, 65 yards, 1:29.
- APP – Dominic De Freitas 27-yard field goal, 3:46. Eagles 26–10. Drive: 9 plays, 66 yards, 4:58.

Fourth quarter

- GASO – Tripp Bryant 27-yard field goal, 3:57. Eagles 29–10. Drive: 17 plays, 81 yards, 10:02.

Statistics	GASO	APP
First downs	22	21
Plays–yards	65–413	62–379
Rushes–yards	38–242	33–187
Passing yards	171	192
Passing: Comp–Att–Int	18–27–1	16–29–4
Turnovers	1	4
Time of possession	30:35	29:25

Team	Category	Player	Statistics
Georgia Southern	Passing	JC French IV	18/25, 171 yards, TD
Georgia Southern	Rushing	OJ Arnold	11 carries, 152 yards
Georgia Southern	Receiving	Marcus Sanders Jr.	5 receptions, 72 yards, TD
Appalachian State	Passing	Matthew Wilson	12/22, 128 yards, 2 INT
Appalachian State	Rushing	Matthew Wilson	12 carries, 110 yards, TD
Appalachian State	Receiving	Dalton Stroman	3 receptions, 96 yards

== Personnel ==
2025 Georgia Southern Eagles football team roster
Players
Coaches
Offense

Pos.	#	Name	Class
WR	1	Dalen Cobb	Sr
QB	2	Tyler Budge	Fr
WR	4	Camden Brown	Sr
WR	5	Marcus Sanders Jr.	Sr
RB	6	David Mbadinga	Jr
TE	7	Ahmon Green	GS
QB	9	Weston Bryan	Fr
QB	10	Charlie Johnston	Fr
WR	11	Brian Green Jr.	So
QB	12	JC French	Jr
WR	13	Dylan Gary	Jr
QB	14	Turner Helton	Jr
WR	15	Taylor Bradshaw	So
RB	16	Jamarian Samuel	Sr
QB	17	Trey Townsend	Fr
WR	18	K. D. Dorsey	So
WR	19	Josh Dallas	Jr
RB	20	Terrance Gibbs	Jr
RB	22	O. J. Arnold	Sr
WR	24	Peyton Plott	Fr
RB	26	Antavious Murphy	Fr
RB	28	J'Shawn Anderson	So
RB	29	Bre'Lan Mareus	Fr
RB	33	Bryce Baker	Fr
RB	35	Taeo Todd	Fr
RB	37	Foster Orris	Fr
WR	38	Kevin Douglas	So
WR	40	Brandon Paul	Fr
TE	48	Aubrey Heath	Fr
OL	50	Jaylen Slaughter	Fr
OL	51	Matthew Williams	So
OL	53	Ty Furnish	Sr
OL	54	Chance Carroll	GS
OL	55	Ethan Williams	So
OL	56	Bryce Miller	So
OL	57	Chandler Strong	Jr
OL	58	Kyle Frazier	GS
OL	59	Brandon Stoner	Fr
OL	63	Colin Alexander	Fr
OL	64	Caelan Williams	GS
OL	66	Johnnie Brown III	Jr
OL	67	Joshua Ford	Fr
OL	68	Jace Molden	Fr
OL	70	Jalen Burgess	Fr
OL	71	Robert Wright Jr.	So
OL	73	Zach Pearson	Fr
OL	74	Pichon Wimbley	Sr
OL	76	Kingtriton Samuela	Fr
OL	77	Ike Turner	Fr
OL	78	Caleb Cook	Sr
WR	80	Jordan Woolen	Fr
WR	81	Jeremiah Ware	Fr
TE	82	Jackson Long	Jr
TE	83	Elija Walton	So
TE	84	J. P. Mikhael	So
TE	86	Henry Gregory	Fr
TE	87	River Helms	Sr
WR	88	Carmelo Mays	Fr

Defense

Pos.	#	Name	Class
LB	1	Brandon Tyson	Jr
LB	2	Brendan Harrington	GS
LB	4	Davon Hicks	Sr
DB	5	Ayden Jackson	Jr
DL	6	Jacob Ferguson	GS
DB	9	Justin Meyers	Sr
LB	10	Jacob Hammonds	Jr
DB	11	Antonio White Jr.	Fr
DB	12	Tracy Hill Jr.	Jr
DB	13	Ethan Pouncey	GS
DB	14	Prince Green III	Sr
LB	15	Holden Trice	So
DB	16	A. J. Brown Sr.	So
DB	17	Jayden Davis	So
DL	18	M. J. Stroud	Jr
DB	19	Fabo Chaney	Fr
DB	20	Jaquari Brown	Fr
DB	22	Elijah Ffrench	Fr
DB	23	Dorrian Smith	Sr
DB	24	Phillip Gladney	Fr
DB	26	Chris Crouch	Sr
DL	27	Branden Palmer	So
DB	28	Elijah McDowell	Fr
DB	29	Devin Collier	Fr
LB	30	C. J. Allen Jr.	Fr
DB	31	Chance Gamble	Sr
DB	32	Jaylen Bentley	Fr
DL	34	JaMari Whitehead	So
LB	35	Caleb Butler	Fr
DB	36	Jadaan Cooper	Fr
DB	38	Jeremiah Holmes	Jr
DB	39	Temirez Williams Jr.	Fr
LB	41	Brandon Alford	So
LB	42	Braxtin McLester	Fr
LB	43	Ethan Johnson	Fr
DL	44	Nigel Eldridge Jr.	Fr
LB	45	Colton Veltkamp	Fr
DL	48	Amari Wilson	Fr
DB	49	Amar Jenkins	Jr
DL	50	Caleb Ellis	Fr
DL	51	Kebba Secka	So
DL	55	Korey Jordan	Fr
DL	57	Latrell Bullard	Sr
DL	90	Da'Shawn Davis	Sr
DL	91	Davion Rhodes	Sr
DL	92	Marcus Downs	Fr
DL	93	Caleb Moore	So
DL	94	Elijah Fears	Fr
DL	95	Kwon McGinney	Jr
DL	96	Jeremiah Ticket	Fr
DL	95	Alijah Lacey	So
DL	97	Eli Anders	Fr
DL	98	Uche Iloh	So
DL	99	Devan Lowe	Jr

Special teams

Pos.	#	Name	Class
P	25	Alex Smith	Jr
LS	46	Gavin Kurpis	Fr
LS	89	Jackson Wheeler	GS
K	91	Evan Scruggs	Fr
LS	93	Gaines Wood	Jr
K	95	Tripp Bryant	Fr
K	98	T. J. Hartley III	So
K	99	Donal Dempsey	Fr

Head coach

- Clay Helton

Coordinators/assistant coaches

- Ryan Aplin – Offensive coordinator/quarterbacks
- Brandon Bailey – Defensive coordinator/safeties
- Blake Wilson – Special teams coordinator
- Zach Lankford – Offensive line/run game coordinator
- Anthony Beck II – Assistant special teams coordinator
- Ced Douglas – Defensive linemen
- Alex Garwig – Linebackers
- Taylor Reed – Running backs
- Darius Safford – Defensive backs
- Bryan Schor – Tight ends
- B. J. Johnson – Outside receivers
- Damion Willis – Inside receivers
- Zak Mizell – Assistant quarterbacks
- Drew Gaither – Assistant linebackers
- Keenan Murphy – Assistant offensive line
- Dillon Springer – Assistant defensive line
- Alex Zettler – Assistant safeties
- Caleb Heintz – Offensive analyst
- Dre Farris – Graduate assistant

Legend

- (C) Team captain
- (S) Suspended
- (I) Ineligible
- Injured
- Redshirt

Roster
Last update: 08/30/2025
