= Darin Hinshaw =

American football player and coach (born 1972)

Purdue Boilermakers
- Title: Quarterbacks coach

Personal information
- Born: June 6, 1972 (age 54); Punta Gorda, Florida, U.S.
- Listed height: 6 ft 2 in (1.88 m)
- Listed weight: 210 lb (95 kg)

Career information
- High school: Charlotte (FL)
- College: UCF
- NFL draft: 1995: undrafted

Career history

Playing
- Cleveland Browns (1995)*; Memphis Mad Dogs (1995)*; Ottawa Rough Riders (1995)*; Birmingham Barracudas (1995)*; San Antonio Texans (1995)*; Orlando Predators (1995–1996); Granite State Warriors (1997); Nashville Kats (1997)
- * Offseason or practice squad member only

Coaching
- Granite State Warriors (1998) Offensive coordinator; UCF (1999) Graduate assistant; UCF (2000) Quarterbacks coach; Middle Tennessee State (2001–2004) Co-offensive coordinator & running backs coach; Middle Tennessee State (2005) Offensive coordinator & wide receivers coach; Georgia Southern (2006) Offensive coordinator & quarterbacks coach; Memphis (2007–2009) Wide receivers coach & senior offensive assistant; Tennessee (2010–2011) Quarterbacks coach; Tennessee (2012) Wide receivers coach & recruiting coordinator; Cincinnati (2013–2015) Passing game coordinator & quarterbacks coach; Kentucky (2016–2020) Co-offensive coordinator & quarterbacks coach; UCF (2021) Senior analyst; UAB (2022) Offensive coordinator & quarterbacks coach; UCF (2023) Offensive coordinator & quarterbacks coach; UCF (2024) Co-offensive coordinator & quarterbacks coach; Purdue (2025–present) Quarterbacks coach

Career AFL statistics
- TD–INT: 2–3
- Passing yards: 210
- Completion percentage: 53.8
- Passer rating: 60.26
- Stats at ArenaFan.com

Darin Clifford Hinshaw (born June 6, 1972) is an American football coach and former quarterback who currently serves as the quarterbacks coach at Purdue. He previously served as the offensive coordinator at the University of Central Florida (UCF). He played college football at UCF, where he finished his career as the program's leader in career passing yards and touchdowns.

== Playing career ==
=== College ===
Hinshaw was initially recruited by Florida by Galen Hall, but committed to UCF after Hall's successor Steve Spurrier recruited Hinshaw's high school quarterback rival to play for the Gators. At UCF, he set multiple career program records in both passing yards and touchdowns, many that have since been broken. He was also a member of the school's men's basketball team for the 1993–94 season when they made the NCAA Tournament.

=== Professional ===
After going undrafted in the 1995 NFL draft, Hinshaw signed with the Cleveland Browns, however he was cut from the team after Mini-camp. Before playing for the Orlando Predators of the Arena Football League (AFL) for two seasons in 1995, he briefly played for a number of CFL expansion teams competing for an active roster spot. He also had stints with the Granite State Warriors (Spring League) and the AFL's Nashville Kats.

== Coaching career ==
=== Early career ===
After playcalling for Granite State for a season before retiring from professional football, Hinshaw decided to pursue coaching. Hinshaw returned to his alma mater UCF in 1999 as a graduate assistant. UCF promoted him to quarterbacks coach in 2000 working with Coach Mike Kruczek and Gene Chizik.

=== Middle Tennessee ===
Hinshaw was soon hired at Middle Tennessee in 2001. At the time, he was the youngest offensive coordinator in D1 football. During his time coaching, the Blue Raiders finished as the 2001 Sun Belt Champion. In 2001, the Blue Raiders had two of the top five rushers in the SBC along with the top overall rushing attack. He coached several record breaking running backs Dwone Hicks, ReShard Lee, and Kendall Newson was drafted in the NFL. In 2002, the Blue Raiders had the nation's No. 21 ranked rushing offense, a 1,000-yard rusher, and two of the top eight rushers in the SBC. In 2003, the Blue Raider offense went down as the highest scoring unit in the Sun Belt Conference at 27.7 points a contest, including four games of 35 points or more. The unit ranked 37th nationally in passing efficiency and had the fifth ranked receiver in the country Tyrone Calico.

=== Georgia Southern ===
He left Middle Tennessee to accept the offensive coordinator position at Georgia Southern in 2006, where he spent one season as the head of the Eagles offense. He helped transition first time head coach Brian VanGorder to take Georgia Southern's Triple option and transition it to a up-tempo offense. Travis Clark set the single-season passing yards record at Georgia Southern that season, which still holds the third-all time spot with 1,808 yards. Jayson Foster set numerous records as all purpose Utility player.

=== Memphis ===
Hinshaw was named the wide receivers coach and senior offensive assistant at Memphis in 2007. Under his guidance he helped mentor Duke Calhoun and Carlos Singleton who both set multiple records at Memphis.

=== Tennessee ===
He joined the coaching staff at Tennessee in 2010 as an offensive assistant and quarterbacks coach under first-year head coach Derek Dooley. Dooley, Jim Chaney, and Hinshaw took a pro-style offense and transitioned it to a spread up-tempo offense. Hinshaw helped direct and improve the Tennessee offense to 5,711 yards in 2012, the second-most in school history. He helped mentor both Matt Simms and Tyler Bray to combined for 3,309 yards passing and 26 touchdowns in 2010. Bray earning SEC freshmen honors three times. In 2011, Rivals.com named him a Top 10 recruiter. In 2012, he was elevated to recruiting coordinator, and wide receivers coach. Hinshaw recruited and coached receivers Cordarrelle Patterson and Justin Hunter, both had breakout years and would declare for the 2013 NFL draft, Patterson selected 29th and Hunter 34th overall, respectively. He helped direct and improve the 2012 Tennessee offense to 5,711 yards, second most in school history. In 2012, Coach Dooley was fired at the end of the 2012 season and Hinshaw was not retained on the staff.

=== Cincinnati ===
Hinshaw was hired as the passing game coordinator and quarterbacks coach at Cincinnati in 2013 on the staff of another head coach in its first season with their program, Tommy Tuberville. Hinshaw, along with Eddie Gran, developed an up-tempo split-spread offense. Hinshaw frequently called plays even though he wasn't the official offensive coordinator.

In 2013, the Bearcats led the American Athletic Conference in total offense (472.1) and rushing offense (168.3). The 2014 Cincinnati Bearcats football team finished the season AAC co-champions. The 2015 season, Cincinnati amassed (537.8) yards per game, which was 6th in the nation. Several offensive players he coached and recruited went onto the NFL such as Chris Moore, Mike Boone, Justin Murray, Korey Cunningham, Parker Ehinger, Johnny Holton, Blake Annen, Kahlil Lewis, Mekale McKay, Tion Green, Deyshawn Bond and Josiah Deguara. He also signed several top recruits such as Gerrid Doaks and Hayden Moore.

=== Kentucky ===
Hinshaw was named the co-offensive coordinator and quarterbacks coach at Kentucky in 2016, following Cincinnati offensive coordinator Eddie Gran. Hinshaw was the "eye in the sky" in the Press box, while Gran was the on field coach. Hinshaw frequently called third-down plays since Gran is known for his conservative calls while Hinshaw was known for his aggressive playcalling. After the 2016–2017 seasons, Gran was criticized for his excessively conservative playcalling compared to his time at Cincinnati.

In 2018, they switched to a more aggressive-up tempo Hinshaw-influenced spread offense which led Kentucky to the best season in school history (10-3) and the Citrus Bowl victory against Penn State. They had a successful year in 2019 posting a (8-5) record. Hinshaw helped mentor wide receiver and kick returner Lynn Bowden to learn to play quarterback in 2019. Under Hinshaw’s guidance, he excelled and was honored Manning Award Quarterback of the Week and later won the Paul Hornung Award. Kentucky's offense generated 2,000 rushing yards and 2,000 passing yards three times (2016, 2017 and 2018) during Hinshaw’s tenure, the first time in school history Kentucky accomplished that in three straight seasons.

=== UAB ===
UAB Interim Head coach Bryant Vincent announced the hiring of Hinshaw on July 29, 2022. At UAB as the offensive coordinator, the program set multiple records for total yards (5,697), rushing yards (3,063), yards per game (438.2) and rushing yards per game (235.6). Under his leadership, UAB running back DeWayne McBride turned in the most decorated season in school history, finishing the regular season as the nation's leading rusher with 1,713 yards. McBride would earn the Walter Camp second-team All-America honors, as well as being named the Conference USA Offensive Player of the Year and a first-team Conference USA selection. Four O-linemen and two wide receivers were named all-conference team.

=== UCF ===
August 2, 2021 he was hired as an analyst returning to his alma mater, UCF. After one-season at UAB, Hinshaw was once again hired by his alma mater UCF as the offensive coordinator on January 3, 2023. Prior to the season, Gus Malzahn announced that he would relinquish his playcalling duties from the previous season and handover to Hinshaw.

At UCF, his offense produced one of the most productive pass offenses and rushing attacks in the nation. The Knights in 2023 ranked eighth in total offense at 487.0 yards per contest and fourth in rushing at 228.2 yards per game (third-highest figure in UCF history). Both figures ranked second in the Big 12.

UCF’s offense was directed by veteran quarterback John Rhys Plumlee who threw for 2,271 yards and 15 TDs and ran for 505 yards and 5 TDs in 2023 to claim All-Big 12 honors. John Rhys had shown significant improvement from the Year before with a jump on QBR from the season before from (134) to (150.5). Receivers Javon Baker and Kobe Hudson both set career high numbers with Baker posting 1,139 yards/7 TDs and selected First-team All-Big 12 and later drafted in the fourth round of NFL. While Hudson posted 900 yards and 8 TDs respectively.
