= Laron (given name) =

Laron or LaRon is a given name. Notable people with the given name include:

- LaRon Byrd (born 1989), American football player
- LaRon Landry (born 1984), American football player
- Laron Profit (born 1977), American basketball player and coach
- Laron Scott (born 1987), American football player
- Juelz Santana (LaRon Louis James) (born 1982), American rapper
