= Ryan Aplin =

American football player and coach (born 1990)

Current position
- Title: Offensive coordinator
- Team: Georgia Southern
- Conference: Sun Belt

Biographical details
- Born: May 8, 1990 (age 36); Tampa, Florida, U.S.

Playing career
- 2009–2012: Arkansas State
- Position: Quarterback

Coaching career (HC unless noted)
- 2013: Ole Miss (intern)
- 2014–2015: Auburn (G.A.)
- 2016: North Alabama (WR)
- 2017: Chattanooga (WR)
- 2018–2019: North Alabama (OC/QB)
- 2020: Western Kentucky (Co-OC/RB)
- 2021: Arkansas State (RB)
- 2022–2023: Georgia Southern (TE/IR/PGC)
- 2024–present: Georgia Southern (OC/QB)

Ryan Gregory Aplin (born May 8, 1990) is an American college football coach and former quarterback who is the offensive coordinator for the Georgia Southern Eagles of the Sun Belt in the NCAA. He previously played college football at Arkansas State University for the Arkansas State Red Wolves.

== Early life ==
Ryan Gregory Aplin was born on May 8, 1990 in Tampa, Florida. Aplin graduated from Fleming Island High School in 2007. Aplin was a 2-star recruit as a quarterback prospect for college football. Aplin was recruited by the Middle Tennessee Blue Raiders and the Arkansas State Red Wolves, eventually signing with the latter.

== Playing career ==
=== Arkansas State ===
==== 2008 ====
Ryan Aplin redshirted during the 2008 Arkansas State season and helped on the scout team.

==== 2009 ====
Now a redshirt freshman, Aplin was the second-string quarterback behind senior Corey Leonard at the start of the 2009 season, but Leonard was demoted mid-season. Aplin would finish the year with 889 passing yards as well as 253 rushing yards, with 7 total touchdowns.

==== 2010 ====
Aplin was the full-time starter beginning in the 2010 season. Arkansas State finished just 4-8 and head coach Steve Roberts was fired, but Aplin performed well, throwing for 2,939 passing yards and rushing for 477 yards in 2010 and scoring 32 total touchdowns. Aplin was named to the Sun Belt Commissioner's List for his efforts. He was also selected as the First Team All-Sun Belt quarterback for this season.

==== 2011 ====
Aplin and the Red Wolves thrived in 2011 under new head coach Hugh Freeze. Arkansas State would finish 10-3 and 8-0 in conference play, and Aplin would pass for 3,588 yards while earning 588 on the ground, scoring 19 passing touchdowns and 10 rushing touchdowns. Aplin was named Sun Belt Conference Player of the Year for his performance during the 2011 season.

==== 2012 ====
Arkansas State replaced Hugh Freeze (who accepted the head coach position at Ole Miss) with Auburn offensive coordinator Gus Malzahn. Malzahn, who guided the Tigers' offense to a national championship in 2010 with Heisman Trophy-winning quarterback Cam Newton, proved successful with Ryan Aplin as well. Arkansas State again finished 10-3 with now a 7-1 conference record, winning the Sun Belt Conference Championship. Aplin threw for a career-best 24 touchdowns with a career-low 4 interceptions, also rushing for 438 yards and 6 touchdowns. Aplin repeated as Sun Belt Conference Player of the Year in 2012. He also won the MVP award for the 2013 GoDaddy.com Bowl, after the Red Wolves defeated the Kent State Golden Flashes 17-13.

==== After college ====
Considered a fringe NFL prospect, Ryan Aplin went undrafted in the 2013 NFL draft. He was reported to have signed with the Cleveland Browns shortly after the draft, but soon pivoted to a career in coaching.

== Coaching career ==
=== Ole Miss ===
Aplin spent the 2013 season as a football administrative assistant at Ole Miss under his former head coach in Hugh Freeze.

=== Auburn ===
Aplin worked as a graduate assistant coach at Auburn under another former head coach in Gus Malzahn from 2014 to 2015 as Aplin worked towards a master's degree in adult education.

=== North Alabama ===
Aplin served as the wide receiver's coach for the North Alabama Lions of the NCAA's Division II during the 2016 season. The Lions finished with an 11-2 record in 2016, participating in the season's national championship game.

=== Chattanooga ===
Aplin was named the wide receiver's coach for the Chattanooga Mocs in 2017. The Mocs performed poorly, finishing with just a 3-8 record and a 3-5 record in conference play.

=== North Alabama (second stint) ===
Aplin returned to North Alabama in 2018, now as their offensive coordinator and quarterbacks coach and with North Alabama now competing as an FCS independent. The Lions finished with a 7-3 record in 2018.

In 2019, the North Alabama Lions joined the Big South Conference. The Lions would finish with a 4-7 record.

=== Western Kentucky ===
Aplin joined the Western Kentucky Hilltoppers as their offensive coordinator and running backs coach for the 2020 season. The offense performed poorly, putting up the 115th-ranked scoring offense nationally out of 128. Western Kentucky finished the regular season with a 5-6 record, finding themselves bowl-eligible in a season shortened by the coronavirus pandemic. Western Kentucky lost to the Georgia State Panthers in the 2021 LendingTree Bowl, and the Hilltoppers finished the season with a record of 5-7.

=== Arkansas State ===
Aplin was named the running backs coach at Arkansas State in 2021, returning to the Red Wolves sideline for the first time since he was their quarterback.

=== Georgia Southern ===
Aplin was hired by Georgia Southern in 2022 and served as their tight ends and inside receivers coach, as well as their passing game coordinator. In 2022, the explosive Georgia Southern passing offense saw All-Sun Belt quarterback Kyle Vantreese throw for 4,253 passing yards and 27 touchdowns. The Eagles finished with a 6-7 record.

In 2023, Georgia Southern's passing offense finished in the top-20 nationally in passing yards per game. Georgia Southern finished with a 6-7 record, making the Myrtle Beach Bowl.

In 2024, Ryan Aplin was promoted to offensive coordinator by the Georgia Southern Eagles. The Eagles' offense was average, finishing 69th out of 134 in scoring offense nationally. However, the team finished with an 8–5 record and a bowl game victory, with the offense being the better performing unit on the season. Georgia Southern's 2025 squad again finished with a nationally average offense, but again compiled a bowl game-winning season at 7–6 where the Eagles' offense was their strong point.

== Personal life ==
Aplin graduated from Arkansas State University with a Bachelor's degree in exercise science in 2012. He earned his master's degree in adult education from Auburn University in 2015. Aplin is married and is the father of four children.
