= Edward Thomas (gridiron football) =

American gridiron football player (born 1974)

No. 97, 9, 52, 59
- Position: Linebacker

Personal information
- Born: September 27, 1974 (age 52); Thomasville, Georgia, U.S.
- Listed height: 6 ft 1 in (1.85 m)
- Listed weight: 230 lb (104 kg)

Career information
- High school: Charles Lincoln Harper (Atlanta, Georgia)
- College: Georgia Southern (1993–1996)

Career history
- Montreal Alouettes (1997–1999); San Francisco 49ers (2000); Jacksonville Jaguars (2000–2002); Tampa Bay Buccaneers (2004)*; Oakland Raiders (2005)*; → Rhein Fire (2005)
- * Offseason or practice squad member only

Awards and highlights
- First-team All-American (1996)
- Stats at Pro Football Reference

Edward Tervino Thomas (born September 27, 1974) is an American former professional football linebacker who played three seasons in the National Football League (NFL) with the San Francisco 49ers and Jacksonville Jaguars. He played college football at Georgia Southern University. He was also a member of the Montreal Alouettes, Tampa Bay Buccaneers, Oakland Raiders and Rhein Fire.

== Early life ==
Edward Tervino Thomas was born on September 27, 1974, in Thomasville, Georgia. He attended Charles Lincoln Harper High School in Atlanta, Georgia.

== College career ==
Thomas was a four-year letterman for the Georgia Southern Eagles from 1993 to 1996. He earned All-Southern Conference and second-team GTE/CoSIDA Academic All-American honors his junior season. He recorded 130 tackles and 15 sacks his senior year in 1996, garnering Division 1-AA first-team All-American and first-team All-Southern Conference recognition. Thomas majored in logistics and intermodal transportation at Georgia Southern.

== Professional career ==
Thomas went undrafted in the 1997 NFL draft. He played in seven games for the Montreal Alouettes of the Canadian Football League (CFL) in 1997, totaling 18 defensive tackles, one special teams tackle, one sack, one interception, and three fumble recoveries. He appeared in three games in 1998, posting nine defensive tackles. He played in 12 games for the Alouettes in 1999, accumulating 24 defensive tackles, two sacks, ten special teams tackles, one forced fumble, and one pass breakup.

Thomas signed with the San Francisco 49ers on June 7, 2000. He played in the first three games of the 2000 season, recording two solo tackles, before being released on September 19 and signed to the team's practice squad two days later. He was promoted back to the active roster on October 14 and appeared in one more game, posting two more solo tackles, before being released on November 2. Thomas was signed back to the practice squad on November 7 before being released again on November 14.

Thomas was signed to the practice squad of the Jacksonville Jaguars on November 21, 2000. He was promoted to the active roster on November 29 and played in three games for the Jaguars that season, totaling four solo tackles. He was released on March 1, 2001, but later re-signed on April 2, 2001. He appeared in all 16 games, starting four in place of the injured T. J. Slaughter, for the Jaguars in 2001, accumulating 17 solo tackles and seven assisted tackles. Thomas appeared in four games during the 2002 season, recording two solo tackles, before being released on October 16, 2002.

Thomas signed with the Tampa Bay Buccaneers on April 20, 2004. He was released on August 31, 2004.

He was signed by the Oakland Raiders on January 22, 2005. He was allocated to NFL Europe to play for the Rhein Fire. He started all ten games for the Fire during the 2005 NFL Europe season, recording 57 defensive tackles, three special teams tackles, one sack, two forced fumbles, and one pass breakup. He was released by the Raiders on September 3, 2005.
