= 1983 Georgia Southern Eagles football team =

American college football season

1983 Georgia Southern Eagles football
- Conference: Independent
- Record: 6–5
- Head coach: Erk Russell (2nd season)
- Home stadium: Womack Stadium

The 1983 Georgia Southern Eagles football team represented the Georgia Southern Eagles of Georgia Southern College (now known as Georgia Southern University) during the 1983 NCAA Division I-AA football season. The Eagles played their home games at Womack Stadium in Statesboro, Georgia. The team was coached by Erk Russell, in his second year as head coach for the Eagles.

== Schedule ==
Date	Time	Opponent	Site	Result	Attendance	Source
September 10	7:00 p.m.	UCF	Womack Stadium; Statesboro, GA	L 29–33	5,815	
September 17	7:00 p.m.	vs. Presbyterian	Memorial Stadium; Savannah, GA	W 34–21	7,913	
September 24	7:00 p.m.	No. 7 Troy State	Womack Stadium; Statesboro, GA	L 27–28	7,378	
October 1	7:00 p.m.	Gardner–Webb	Womack Stadium; Statesboro, GA	W 25–11	6,278	
October 15	2:00 p.m.	at East Tennessee State	Memorial Center; Johnson City, TN	L 7–24	7,248	
October 22	7:00 p.m.	vs. Newberry	Butler Stadium; Augusta, GA	L 24–27	4,500	
October 29	1:30 p.m.	at Catawba	Salisbury, NC	W 10–3	3,917	
November 5	3:00 p.m.	at Wofford	Snyder Field; Spartanburg, SC	W 27–16	5,894	
November 12	1:30 p.m.	Mars Hill^{†}	Womack Stadium; Statesboro, GA	W 35–0	9,385	
November 19	7:00 p.m.	at Valdosta State	Bazemore–Hyder Stadium; Valdosta, GA	L 29–34	8,000	
November 26	7:00 p.m.	at Savannah State	Ted Wright Stadium; Savannah, GA	W 15–0	1,000	
^{†}Homecoming; Rankings from NCAA Division II Football Committee Poll released prior to the game; All times are in Eastern time
