= 2023 Georgia Southern Eagles football team =

American college football season

2023 Georgia Southern Eagles football

Myrtle Beach Bowl, L 21–41 vs. Ohio
- Conference: Sun Belt Conference
- East Division
- Record: 6–7 (3–5 Sun Belt)
- Head coach: Clay Helton (2nd season)
- Offensive coordinator: Bryan Ellis (2nd season)
- Offensive scheme: Multiple
- Defensive coordinator: Brandon Bailey (1st season)
- Base defense: 4–2–5
- Home stadium: Paulson Stadium

2023 Sun Belt Conference football standings
	Conf.			Overall
Team	W		L	W		L
East Division
James Madison* x	7	–	1	11	–	2
Appalachian State y	6	–	2	9	–	5
Coastal Carolina	5	–	3	8	–	5
Old Dominion	5	–	3	6	–	7
Georgia State	3	–	5	7	–	6
Marshall	3	–	5	6	–	7
Georgia Southern	3	–	5	6	–	7
West Division
Troy xy$	7	–	1	11	–	3
Texas State	4	–	4	8	–	5
Arkansas State	4	–	4	6	–	7
South Alabama	4	–	4	7	–	6
Louisiana	3	–	5	6	–	7
Southern Miss	2	–	6	3	–	9
Louisiana–Monroe	0	–	8	2	–	10
Championship: Troy 49, Appalachian State 23
$ – Conference champion; x – Division champion/co-champions; y – Championship game participant; * – Ineligible for postseason play due to FCS-to-FBS transition rules

The 2023 Georgia Southern Eagles football team represented Georgia Southern University during the 2023 NCAA Division I FBS football season. The Eagles played their home games at Paulson Stadium in Statesboro, Georgia, and competed in the East Division of the Sun Belt Conference. The team was coached by second-year head coach Clay Helton.

== Preseason ==
=== Recruiting class ===
College recruiting
Name	Hometown	School	Height	Weight	40^{‡}	Commit date
Beau Allen; QB		Tarleton	6 ft 2 in (1.88 m)	203 lb (92 kg)	–	
Beau Allen; QB	Recruit ratings: No ratings found					
Jshawn Anderson; RB	Hartsville, SC	Hartsville HS	6 ft 0 in (1.83 m)	190 lb (86 kg)	–	
Jshawn Anderson; RB	Recruit ratings: ESPN: (74)					
Jaylon Barden; ATH		Pitt	6 ft 0 in (1.83 m)	180 lb (82 kg)	–	
Jaylon Barden; ATH	Recruit ratings: No ratings found					
Davis Brin; QB	Boerne, TX	Champion HS; Tulsa	6 ft 2 in (1.88 m)	181 lb (82 kg)	–	Jan 2, 2023
Davis Brin; QB	Recruit ratings: Rivals: 247Sports:					
Bryson Broadway; OT	Dawsonville, GA	Dawson County HS; Georgia State	6 ft 5 in (1.96 m)	275 lb (125 kg)	–	Dec 12, 2022
Bryson Broadway; OT	Recruit ratings: No ratings found					
DeAndre Buchannon; WR	Atlanta, GA	Carver HS	5 ft 10 in (1.78 m)	160 lb (73 kg)	–	
DeAndre Buchannon; WR	Recruit ratings: 247Sports: ESPN: (74)					
Chris Carter; OT	Garden City, KS	Garden City CC	6 ft 7 in (2.01 m)	280 lb (130 kg)	–	
Chris Carter; OT	Recruit ratings: No ratings found					
Kenneth Dorsey; WR	Evans, GA	Evans HS	6 ft 1 in (1.85 m)	194 lb (88 kg)	–	
Kenneth Dorsey; WR	Recruit ratings: 247Sports:					
Davon Ferguson; CB		Bowling Green	5 ft 11 in (1.80 m)	190 lb (86 kg)	–	
Davon Ferguson; CB	Recruit ratings: No ratings found					
Jacob Ferguson; DL	Council Bluffs, IA	Iowa Western CC	6 ft 3 in (1.91 m)	245 lb (111 kg)	–	
Jacob Ferguson; DL	Recruit ratings: No ratings found					
JC French; QB	Norcross, GA	Blessed Trinity Catholic HS; Memphis	6 ft 0 in (1.83 m)	200 lb (91 kg)	–	Jan 8, 2023
JC French; QB	Recruit ratings: No ratings found					
Davon Gilmore; LB			6 ft 3 in (1.91 m)	233 lb (106 kg)	–	
Davon Gilmore; LB	Recruit ratings: No ratings found					
Damel Hickman; CB		East Carolina	6 ft 0 in (1.83 m)	180 lb (82 kg)	–	
Damel Hickman; CB	Recruit ratings: No ratings found					
Ayden Jackson; WR	Marietta, GA	Walton HS	5 ft 11 in (1.80 m)	175 lb (79 kg)	–	
Ayden Jackson; WR	Recruit ratings: No ratings found					
Matthew James; EDGE	Jupiter, FL	Jupiter Christian School	6 ft 6.5 in (1.99 m)	215 lb (98 kg)	–	Aug 12, 2022
Matthew James; EDGE	Recruit ratings: 247Sports:					
Will Johnson; EDGE	Tucker, GA	Tucker HS	6 ft 3 in (1.91 m)	225 lb (102 kg)	–	Jul 29, 2022
Will Johnson; EDGE	Recruit ratings: 247Sports:					
Alijah Lacey; EDGE	Bloomingdale, GA	New Hampstead HS	6 ft 5 in (1.96 m)	210 lb (95 kg)	–	
Alijah Lacey; EDGE	Recruit ratings: 247Sports:					
Tarian Lee Jr. LB		Texas A&M	6 ft 2 in (1.88 m)	233 lb (106 kg)	–	
Tarian Lee Jr. LB	Recruit ratings: No ratings found					
Caimon Mathis; DB	DeSoto, TX	DeSoto HS	6 ft 0 in (1.83 m)	175 lb (79 kg)	–	
Caimon Mathis; DB	Recruit ratings: No ratings found					
Jaden Mikhael; TE	Niceville, FL	Niceville HS	6 ft 4 in (1.93 m)	231 lb (105 kg)	–	
Jaden Mikhael; TE	Recruit ratings: 247Sports:					
Bryson Norris; IOL	Coffeyville, KS	Coffeyville CC	6 ft 4 in (1.93 m)	330 lb (150 kg)	–	
Bryson Norris; IOL	Recruit ratings: No ratings found					
Anthony Queeley; WR	Orlando, FL	Lake Nona HS; Syracuse	6 ft 2 in (1.88 m)	195 lb (88 kg)	–	Dec 18, 2022
Anthony Queeley; WR	Recruit ratings: No ratings found					
Branden Palmer; EDGE	Cornelius, NC	William Amos Hough HS	6 ft 4 in (1.93 m)	205 lb (93 kg)	–	
Branden Palmer; EDGE	Recruit ratings: No ratings found					
Troy Pikes; DL	Atlanta, GA	Mays HS	6 ft 3 in (1.91 m)	270 lb (120 kg)	–	
Troy Pikes; DL	Recruit ratings: 247Sports:					
Kebba Secka; DL	Lithia Springs, GA	Lithia Springs Comprehensive HS	6 ft 3 in (1.91 m)	235 lb (107 kg)	–	
Kebba Secka; DL	Recruit ratings: 247Sports:					
Alex Smith; P	Melbourne, Australia	ProKick Australia	6 ft 6 in (1.98 m)	220 lb (100 kg)	–	
Alex Smith; P	Recruit ratings: 247Sports:					
Matthew Smith; IOL	Harlem, GA	Harlem HS	6 ft 5 in (1.96 m)	300 lb (140 kg)	–	
Matthew Smith; IOL	Recruit ratings: No ratings found					
TJ Smith; S	Powder Springs, GA	McEachern HS; Kansas State	5 ft 9 in (1.75 m)	190 lb (86 kg)	–	
TJ Smith; S	Recruit ratings: No ratings found					
Keaton Upshaw; TE		Kentucky	6 ft 7 in (2.01 m)	225 lb (102 kg)	–	
Keaton Upshaw; TE	Recruit ratings: No ratings found					
Keion Wallace; WR	Springfield, GA	Effingham County HS	6 ft 3 in (1.91 m)	210 lb (95 kg)	–	
Keion Wallace; WR	Recruit ratings: No ratings found					
Coby Walton; QB	Nolensville, TN	Nolensville HS	6 ft 1 in (1.85 m)	180 lb (82 kg)	–	
Coby Walton; QB	Recruit ratings: 247Sports:					
Elijah Walton; ATH	Citra, FL	North Marion HS	6 ft 4 in (1.93 m)	210 lb (95 kg)	–	
Elijah Walton; ATH	Recruit ratings: 247Sports:					
Jamari Whitehead; LB	Jacksonville, FL	Raines HS	6 ft 2 in (1.88 m)	210 lb (95 kg)	–	
Jamari Whitehead; LB	Recruit ratings: 247Sports:					
Cameron Williams; S		Washington	6 ft 0 in (1.83 m)	205 lb (93 kg)	–	
Cameron Williams; S	Recruit ratings: No ratings found					
Ethan Williams; IOL	Orange Park, FL	Fleming Island HS	6 ft 3 in (1.91 m)	285 lb (129 kg)	–	
Ethan Williams; IOL	Recruit ratings: 247Sports:					
Matthew Williams; OL	Appling, GA	Harlem HS	6 ft 5 in (1.96 m)	300 lb (140 kg)	–	
Matthew Williams; OL	Recruit ratings: No ratings found					
Robert Wright; IOL	Stockbridge, GA	Stockbridge HS	6 ft 4 in (1.93 m)	285 lb (129 kg)	–	
Robert Wright; IOL	Recruit ratings: No ratings found					

=== Media poll ===
In the Sun Belt preseason coaches' poll, the Eagles were picked to finish in fifth place in the East division.

Offensive lineman Khalil Crowder, wide receiver Khaleb Hood, and linebacker Marques Watson-Trent were named to the preseason All-Sun Belt first team. Tight end Jjay Mcafee was named to the second team.

== Personnel ==
2023 Georgia Southern Eagles football team roster
Players
Coaches
Offense

Pos.	#	Name	Class
WR	1	Jaylon Barden	Sr
WR	2	Derwin Burgess Jr.	Jr
WR	4	Anthony Queeley
QB	5	Davis Brin
TE	6	Keaton Upshaw
WR	7	Khaleb Hood
TE	9	Jjay Mcafee
QB	10	David Dallas	Fr
TE	11	Beau Johnson	Sr
QB	12	JC French	Fr
QB	13	Coby Walton	Fr
WR	14	Sam Kenerson	Jr
WR	15	DeAndre Buchannon	Fr
QB	16	Colton FitzGerald	So
WR	17	Dalen Cobb	So
WR	18	KD Dorsey	Fr
QB	19	Beau Allen	Jr
WR	19	Josh Dallas	Fr
RB	20	Terrance Gibbs	Fr
WR	21	Marcus Sanders Jr.	So
RB	22	OJ Arnold	So
RB	23	Tyler Jordan	Sr
WR	24	Joshua Thompson	So
RB	25	Jalen White	Sr
WR	26	Keion Wallace	Fr
TE	27	Ethan Dirrim	Sr
RB	28	J'Shawn Anderson	Fr
RB	29	Jamarian Samuel	Jr
WR	30	Alex Bowen	Jr
RB	31	David Mbadinga	Fr
RB	33	Robert Edwards III	Fr
RB	35	Terron Dixon II	Sr
WR	38	Kevin Douglas	Fr
TE	48	Dylan Snyder	So
OL	51	Matthew Williams	Fr
OL	55	Ethan Williams	Fr
OL	56	Brian Miller
OL	57	Chandler Strong	Fr
OL	58	Aaron Pyron	Sr
OL	60	Rasheed Miller	Jr
OL	62	Bryce Miller	Fr
OL	64	Caelan Williams	Jr
OL	66	Johnnie Brown III	Fr
OL	68	Nate Lewis	Fr
OL	70	Korbett MacGregor	Fr
OL	71	Robert Wright Jr.	Fr
OL	72	Khalil Crowder
OL	74	Pichon Wimbley	So
OL	75	Bryson Broadway	Sr
OL	76	CK Carter	So
OL	77	Griffin Carder	Sr
OL	78	Caleb Cook	So
WR	80	Saan Lewis
WR	81	Parker Self	Jr
TE	82	JP Mikhael	Fr
TE	83	Elija Walton	Fr
WR	84	Ethan Christian	Fr
WR	85	Brooks Pangle	Fr
WR	86	Graeme Williams	So
TE	87	Evan Lester Jr.	So
WR	88	Lawson Bachelder	Jr
WR	89	Taylor Bradshaw	Fr

Defense

Pos.	#	Name	Class
LB	1	Marques Watson-Trent	Jr
DB	1	Jalen Denton	Jr
DB	4	Damel Hickman
DB	5	TJ Smith	Jr
DB	6	Cam Williams	Sr
LB	7	Tarian Lee Jr.	Sr
LB	9	Khadry Jackson
LB	11	Jon Ferguson
DL	13	Isaac Walker	So
DB	14	Prince Green	So
LB	15	Davon Gilmore	Sr
DB	16	Tyrell Davis	So
DB	17	Shemar Bartholomew
DL	18	MJ Stroud	Fr
DB	20	Seth Robertson	Sr
DB	21	Caimon Mathis	Fr
DB	22	Marc Stampley II	So
DB	23	Mari Wingard
DB	24	Tracy Hill Jr.	Fr
DB	25	Ayden Jackson	Fr
DB	26	Chase Dial-Watson	Jr
DB	27	Andrew Douglas	So
DB	28	Chandler Dial-Watson	Jr
DB	29	Justin Meyers	So
DB	30	Jack Ferguson	Jr
DB	31	Jaden Martin-Burgess	Fr
DB	32	Kevin Speed	Fr
LB	33	Holden Trice	Fr
LB	34	Jamari Whitehead	Fr
LB	35	Nigel Manns	Jr
DB	36	Treston Jordan	Fr
LB	37	Quincy Darnell	Sr
LB	39	Reid Dedman	Sr
DL	42	Branden Palmer	Fr
LB	43	Jacob Hammonds	Fr
DB	44	Jeffrey Smyth	Sr
DB	45	Chris Crouch	So
DB	47	Elijah Hynes	Fr
LB	48	Zack Blackwell	Fr
DB	49	Amar Jenkins	Fr
DL	50	Johnathan Douglas	Jr
DL	51	Kebba Secka	Fr
DL	52	Jacob Ferguson	Jr
DL	53	Trevon Locke	Jr
DL	57	Latrell Bullard	So
DL	79	Weston Wallace	Jr
DL	88	Justin Rhodes	Jr
DL	90	Da'Shawn Davis	So
DL	91	Davion Rhodes	So
DL	92	Kristian Varner	Sr
DL	93	Troy Pikes	Fr
DL	94	Elhadj Fall	Fr
DL	95	Alijah Lacey	Fr
DL	96	Lonnie Leverette	So
DL	97	Myles Winslow	So
DL	98	Tyler Padgett	Fr
DL	99	Kierron Smith	Sr

Special teams

Pos.	#	Name	Class
P	82	Matthew Daniel	Sr
LS	89	Jackson Wheeler	Sr
P	90	Alex Smith	Fr
LS	93	Gaines Wood	Fr
LS	94	Collin Springer
LS	95	Mark Langston	Sr
K	96	Chase Folser	Fr
K	97	Brendan Franke	Sr
K	98	Michael Lantz	Sr
P	99	Walker Bradberry	So

Head coach

- Clay Helton (Houston)

Coordinators/assistant coaches

- Kevin Whitley (Georgia Southern)
  Cornerbacks
- Brandon Bailey (Georgia Southern)
  Defensive coordinator/linebackers
- Bryan Ellis (UAB)
  Offensive coordinator/quarterbacks
- Ryan Aplin (Arkansas State)
  Tight ends/Inside receivers/Pass game coordinator
- Darius Eubanks (Georgia Southern)
  Safeties and nickels
- BJ Johnson (Georgia Southern)
  Wide receivers
- Taylor Reed (Central Arkansas)
  Running backs
- Rip Rowan (Austin Peay)
  Defensive line
- Turner West (Memphis)
  Special teams coordinator
- TJ Woods (Azusa Pacific)
  Offensive line/Run game coordinator

Legend

- (C) Team captain
- (S) Suspended
- (I) Ineligible
- Injured
- Redshirt

Roster
Last update: 3 September 2023

== Schedule ==
The football schedule was announced February 24, 2023.

Date	Time	Opponent	Site	TV	Result	Attendance
September 2	6:00 p.m.	The Citadel*	Paulson Stadium; Statesboro, GA	ESPN+	W 34–0	17,803
September 9	6:00 p.m.	UAB*	Paulson Stadium; Statesboro, GA	ESPN+	W 49–35	20,103
September 16	12:00 p.m.	at Wisconsin*	Camp Randall Stadium; Madison, WI	BTN	L 14–35	75,610
September 23	2:00 p.m.	at Ball State*	Scheumann Stadium; Muncie, IN	ESPN+	W 40–3	10,118
September 30	7:00 p.m.	Coastal Carolina	Paulson Stadium; Statesboro, GA	NFLN	W 38–28	26,483
October 14	12:00 p.m.	at James Madison	Bridgeforth Stadium; Harrisonburg, VA	ESPN2	L 13–41	25,097
October 21	2:00 p.m.	Louisiana–Monroe^{†}	Paulson Stadium; Statesboro, GA	ESPN+	W 38–28	21,068
October 26	7:30 p.m.	Georgia State	Paulson Stadium; Statesboro, GA (Modern Day Hate)	ESPN2	W 44–27	23,389
November 4	7:00 p.m.	at Texas State	Bobcat Stadium; San Marcos, TX	ESPN+	L 24–45	18,204
November 11	7:00 p.m.	at Marshall	Joan C. Edwards Stadium; Huntington, WV	NFLN	L 33–38	19,175
November 18	6:00 p.m.	Old Dominion	Paulson Stadium; Statesboro, GA	ESPN+	L 17–20	20,032
November 25	3:30 p.m.	at Appalachian State	Kidd Brewer Stadium; Boone, NC (Deeper Than Hate)	ESPNU	L 27–55	31,248
December 16	11:00 a.m.	vs. Ohio*	Brooks Stadium; Conway, SC (Myrtle Beach Bowl)	ESPN	L 21–41	8,059
*Non-conference game; ^{†}Homecoming; Rankings from AP Poll and CFP Rankings released prior to game; All times are in Eastern time

== Game summaries ==
=== at Wisconsin ===
Game Three – Georgia Southern Eagles (2–0) vs. Wisconsin Badgers (1–1) – Game summary

Quarter	1	2	3	4	Total
Eagles	0	7	7	0	14
Badgers	0	7	21	7	35

at Camp Randall Stadium, Madison, Wisconsin

- Date: September 16, 2023
- Game time: 12:00 p.m. EST
- Game weather: 69 °F (21 °C); Cloudy; Wind at NW4 MPH
- Game attendance: 75,610
- Referee: Tim O'Dey
- TV announcers (BTN): Mark Followill (play-by-play), Matt Millen (analyst) and Elise Menaker (sideline)

Game information

First quarter

No scoring

Second quarter

- (14:18) WIS – Tanner Mordecai 1-yard run (Nathanial Vakos kick) (Drive: 11 plays, 70 yards, 4:40; Wisconsin 7–0)
- (12:11) GASO – OJ Arnold 4-yard run (Michael Lantz kick) (Drive: 4 plays, 77 yards, 2:03; Tied 7–7)

Third quarter

- (12:33) GASO – Jjay Mcafee 25-yard pass from Davis Brin (Michael Lantz kick) (Drive: 3 plays, 75 yards, 1:04; Georgia Southern 14–7.)
- (10:53) WIS – Braelon Allen 4-yard run (Nathanial Vakos kick) (Drive: 5 plays, 58 yards, 1:35; Tied 14–14)
- (7:40) WIS – Tanner Mordecai 18-yard run (Nathanial Vakos kick) (Drive: 6 plays, 40 yards, 1:59; Wisconsin 21–14)
- (0:39) WIS – Braelon Allen 2-yard run (Nathanial Vakos kick) (Drive: 10 plays, 80 yards, 5:05; Wisconsin 28–14)

Fourth quarter

- (5:51) WIS – Chez Mellusi 1-yard run (Nathanial Vakos kick) (Drive: 7 plays, 86 yards, 3:41; Wisconsin 35–14)

Statistics	GASO	WIS
First downs	23	22
Total yards	80–455	69–451
Rushing yards	28–72	38–207
Passing yards	383	244
Passing: Comp–Att–Int	33–52–5	20–31–0
Time of possession	31:23	28:37

Team	Category	Player	Statistics
Georgia Southern	Passing	Davis Brin	33/52, 383 yards, 1 TD, 5 INT
Georgia Southern	Rushing	OJ Arnold	10 carries, 66 yards, 1 TD
Georgia Southern	Receiving	Derwin Burgess Jr.	8 receptions, 124 yards
Wisconsin	Passing	Tanner Mordecai	19/30, 236 yards
Wisconsin	Rushing	Braelon Allen	12 carries, 94 yards, 2 TD
Wisconsin	Receiving	Chimere Dike	3 receptions, 57 yards

=== at Ball State ===
Game Four – Georgia Southern Eagles (2–1) at Ball State Cardinals (1–2) – Game summary

Quarter	1	2	3	4	Total
Georgia Southern	14	9	10	7	40
Ball State	0	0	0	3	3

at Scheumann Stadium • Muncie, IN

- Date: Saturday, September 23, 2023
- Game time: 2:00 p.m. EST
- Game weather: -
- Game attendance: 10,118
- TV: ESPN+

Game information

First quarter

- (11:51) GASO – Evan Lester Jr. 1-yard pass from Davis Brin (Michael Lantz kick) (Drive: 9 plays, 52 yards, 3:04; Georgia Southern 7–0)
- (8:47) GASO – Keaton Upshaw 9-yard pass from Davis Brin (Michael Lantz kick) (Drive: 4 plays, 63 yards, 1:30; Georgia Southern 14–0)

Second quarter

- (12:37) GASO – Michael Lantz 41-yard field goal (Drive: 6 plays, 16 yards, 1:37; Georgia Southern 17–0)
- (6:36) GASO – Michael Lantz 26-yard field goal (Drive: 9 plays, 55 yards, 3:18; Georgia Southern 20–0)
- (0:00) GASO – Michael Lantz 37-yard field goal (Drive: 8 plays, 57 yards, 0:43; Georgia Southern 23–0)

Third quarter

- (8:47) GASO – Khaleb Hood 21-yard pass from Davis Brin (Michael Lantz kick) (Drive: 4 plays, 56 yards, 1:10; Georgia Southern 30–0)
- (1:03) GASO – Michael Lantz 35-yard field goal (Drive: 8 plays, 28 yards, 2:11; Georgia Southern 33–0)

Fourth quarter

- (13:42) GASO – Anthony Queeley 8-yard pass from Davis Brin (Michael Lantz kick) (Drive: 4 plays, 55 yards, 1:06; Georgia Southern 40–0)
- (7:15) BALL – Jackson Courville 23-yard field goal (Drive: 12 plays, 69 yards, 6:27; Georgia Southern 40–3)

Statistics	GASO	BALL
First downs	25	10
Total yards	77–530	55–197
Rushing yards	27–167	28–37
Passing yards	363	160
Passing: Comp–Att–Int	36–50–0	14–29–2
Time of possession	30:41	29:19

Team	Category	Player	Statistics
Georgia Southern	Passing	Davis Brin	34/46, 344 yards, 4 TD
Georgia Southern	Rushing	OJ Arnold	9 carries, 90 yards
Georgia Southern	Receiving	Khaleb Hood	7 receptions, 107 yards, TD
Ball State	Passing	Kadin Semonza	11/23, 123 yards, 2 INT
Ball State	Rushing	Marquez Cooper	9 carries, 16 yards
Ball State	Receiving	Rico Barfield	2 receptions, 50 yards

=== Georgia State ===
Game Eight – Georgia State Panthers (6–1) vs Georgia Southern Eagles (5–2)

Quarter	1	2	3	4	Total
Panthers	0	0	0	0	0
Eagles	0	0	0	0	0

at Paulson Stadium • Statesboro, Georgia

- Date: October 26, 2023
- Game time: 7:30 p.m. EST
- Game attendance: 23,389
- TV announcers (ESPN2): Courtney Lyle (play-by-play) and Hutson Mason (analyst)

Game information

First quarter
Second quarter
Third quarter
Fourth quarter

Win Probability

Line

Over/Under

Statistics	GSU	GASO
First downs		
Total yards		
Rushing yards		
Passing yards		
Turnovers		
Time of possession		

Team	Category	Player	Statistics
Georgia State	Passing		
Georgia State	Rushing		
Georgia State	Receiving		
Georgia Southern	Passing		
Georgia Southern	Rushing		
Georgia Southern	Receiving		

=== at Texas State ===
Game Nine – Georgia Southern Eagles at Texas State Bobcats – Game summary

Quarter	1	2	3	4	Total
Eagles	10	0	7	7	24
Bobcats	7	24	14	0	45

at Bobcat Stadium, San Marcos, Texas

- Date: November 4
- Game time: 4:00 p.m. CDT
- Game weather: Sunny
- Game attendance: 18,204
- Referee: Trennis Livingston
- TV announcers (ESPN+): Brant Freeman, Keith Moreland, and Koral Riggs
- Box score, Recap

Game information
First quarter
- TXST – Joey Hobert 23-yard pass from T. J. Finley (Mason Shipley kick), 12:45. Bobcats 7–0. Drive: 5 plays, 75 yards, 2:15.
- GASO – Michael Lantz 29-yard field goal, 11:09. Bobcats 7–3. Drive: 4 plays, 6 yards, 1:23.
- GASO – Jalen White 39-yard run (Michael Lantz kick), 3:36. Eagles 10–7. Drive: 7 plays, 73 yards, 3:05.

Second quarter

- TXST – Konner Fox 3-yard pass from T. J. Finley (Mason Shipley kick), 10:45. Bobcats 14–10. Drive: 15 plays, 75 yards, 7:51.
- TXST – Kole Wilson 8-yard pass from T. J. Finley (Mason Shipley kick), 3:46. Bobcats 21–10. Drive: 6 plays, 60 yards, 3:41.
- TXST – Mason Shipley 31-yard field goal, 2:04. Bobcats 24–10. Drive: 5 plays, 23 yards, 1:35.
- TXST – T. J. Finley 16-yard run (Mason Shipley kick), 0:42. Bobcats 31–10. Drive: 5 plays, 60 yards, 0:46.

Third quarter

- TXST – T. J. Finley 12-yard run (Mason Shipley kick), 9:52. Bobcats 38–10. Drive: 6 plays, 61 yards, 1:44.
- TXST – Donerio Davenport 1-yard run (Mason Shipley kick), 2:34. Bobcats 45–10. Drive: 11 plays, 74 yards, 4:40.
- GASO – Jjay McAfee 32-yard pass from Davis Brin (Michael Lantz kick), 0:25. Bobcats 45–17. Drive: 5 plays, 86 yards, 2:05.

Fourth quarter

- GASO – Jalen White 3-yard run (Michael Lantz kick), 8:40. Bobcats 45–24. Drive: 7 plays, 76 yards, 3:44.

Statistics	GASO	TXST
First downs	21	30
Total yards	375	487
Rushing yards	180	186
Passing yards	195	301
Turnovers	2	1
Time of possession	25:04	34:56

Team	Category	Player	Statistics
Georgia Southern	Passing	Davis Brin	18/27, 195 yards, TD, INT
Georgia Southern	Rushing	Jalen White	17 rushes, 159 yards, 2 TD
Georgia Southern	Receiving	Khaleb Hood	7 receptions, 67 yards
Texas State	Passing	T. J. Finley	25/31, 301 yards, 3 TD
Texas State	Rushing	Ismail Mahdi	20 rushes, 99 yards
Texas State	Receiving	Joey Hobert	13 receptions, 141 yards, TD

=== at Marshall ===
Game Ten – Georgia Southern Eagles (6–3) at Marshall Thundering Herd (4–5)

Quarter	1	2	3	4	Total
Eagles	3	17	6	7	33
Thundering Herd	10	7	7	14	38

at Joan C. Edwards Stadium • Huntington, West Virginia

- Date: Saturday, November 11, 2023
- Game time: 7:00 p.m. EST
- Game weather: Sunny
- Game attendance: 19,175
- Referee: Scott Broadway
- TV announcers (NFLN): Jason Ross Jr. (play-by-play), Tyoka Jackson (analyst)

Game information

First quarter

- (14:45) MRSH – Jayden Harrison 98 yard kickoff return, Rece Verhoff kick (Marshall 7–0)
- (6:15) GASO – Michael Lantz 35 yard field goal (Drive: 4 plays, 3 yards, 1:26; Marshall 7–3)
- (2:49) MRSH – Rece Verhoff 22 yard field goal (Drive: 6 plays, 71 yards, 3:26; Marshall 10–3)

Second quarter

- (11:15) GASO – Jaylon Barden 9 yard pass from Davis Brin, Michael Lantz kick (Drive: 8 plays, 52 yards, 3:32; Tied 10–10)
- (5:32) MRSH – Caleb McMillan 21 yard run, Rece Verhoff kick (Drive: 10 plays, 74 yards, 5:39; Marshall 17–10)
- (3:07) GASO – Dalen Cobb 47 yard pass from Davis Brin, Michael Lantz kick (Drive: 4 plays, 75 yards, 2:25; Tied 17–17)
- (0:12) GASO – Michael Lantz 38 yard field goal (Drive: 7 plays, 26 yards, 0:59; Georgia Southern 20–17)

Third quarter

- (6:51) GASO – Michael Lantz 40 yard field goal (Drive: 9 plays, 39 yards, 2:56; Georgia Southern 23–17)
- (5:06) MRSH – Rasheen Ali 2 yard run, Rece Verhoff kick (Drive: 4 plays, 70 yards, 1:45; Marshall 24–23)
- (1:56) GASO – Michael Lantz 21 yard field goal (Drive: 6 plays, 72 yards, 3:10; Georgia Southern 26–24)

Fourth quarter

- (10:51) MRSH – Rasheen Ali 55 yard run, Rece Verhoff kick (Drive: 1 play, 55 yards, 0:09; Marshall 31–26)
- (2:41) MRSH – Rasheen Ali 9 yard run, Rece Verhoff kick (Drive: 1 play, 9 yards, 0:06; Marshall 38–26)
- (0:50) GASO – Derwin Burgess 2 yard pass from Davis Brin, Michael Lantz kick (Drive: 12 plays, 61 yards, 1:46; Marshall 38–33)

Statistics	GASO	MRSH
First downs	18	14
Plays–yards	80–384	54–370
Rushes–yards	24–77	33–169
Passing yards	307	201
Passing: comp–att–int	29–56–0	15–21–1
Turnovers		
Time of possession	32:42	27:18

Team	Category	Player	Statistics
Georgia Southern	Passing	Davis Brin	29/54, 307 yards, 3 TD
Georgia Southern	Rushing	Jalen White	17 carries, 67 yards
Georgia Southern	Receiving	Jaylon Barden	6 receptions, 96 yards, 1 TD
Marshall	Passing	Cole Pennington	15/20, 201 yards, 1 INT
Marshall	Rushing	Rasheen Ali	24 carries, 165 yards, 3 TD
Marshall	Receiving	DeMarcus Harris	4 receptions, 147 yards

=== Vs. Ohio ===
Game Thirteen – Georgia Southern Eagles (6–6) vs. Ohio Bobcats (9–3) (2023 Myrtle Beach Bowl)

Quarter	1	2	3	4	Total
Georgia Southern	0	0	14	7	21
Ohio	3	17	14	7	41

at Brooks Stadium • Conway, South Carolina

- Date: Saturday, December 16, 2023
- Game time: 11:00 a.m. EST
- Game weather: sunny
- Game attendance: 8,059
- Referee: Patrick Foy (Mountain West)
- TV announcers (ESPN): Drew Carter (play-by-play), Dustin Fox (analyst), and Stormy Buonantony (sideline)
- Ohio notes, boxscore

Game information

First Quarter

- (06:27) OHIO - Gianni Spetic 27 yd FG 11 plays, 43 yards, TOP 06:42 (OHIO 3–0)

Second Quarter

- (12:22) OHIO - Ricky Hunt 2 yd Run (Gianni Spetic Kick) 13 plays, 59 yards, TOP 07:13 (OHIO 10–0)
- (03:16) OHIO - Ricky Hunt 18 yd pass from Parker Navarro (Gianni Spetic Kick) 4 plays, 62 yards, TOP 01:53 (OHIO 10–0)
- (00:00) OHIO - Gianni Spetic 26 yd FG 6 plays, 25 yards, TOP 01:07 (OHIO 20–0)

Third Quarter

- (11:46) OHIO - Ricky Hunt 6 yd Run (Gianni Spetic Kick) 1 play, 6 yards, TOP 00:05 (OHIO 27–0)
- (07:54) GASO - David Mbadinga 3 yd Run (Michael Lantz Kick) 9 plays, 69 yards, TOP 03:52 (OHIO 27–7)
- (11:46) OHIO - Ricky Hunt 40 yd Run (Gianni Spetic Kick) 6 plays, 60 yards, TOP 03:19 (OHIO 34–7)
- (01:13) GASO - Derwin Burgess Jr. 65 yd pass from Davis Brin 2 plays, 68 yards, TOP 00:51 (OHIO 34–14)

Fourth Quarter

- (12:27) GASO - Jjay Mcafee 15 yd pass from Davis Brin 7 plays, 52 yards, TOP 03:46 (OHIO 34–21)
- (02:52) OHIO - Ricky Hunt 9 yd Run (Gianni Spetic Kick) 8 plays, 55 yards, TOP 03:40 (OHIO 41–21)

Statistics	Georgia Southern	Ohio
First downs	16	18
Total Yards	383	352
Rushes/yards	21–33	46–232
Passing yards	350	120
Passing: Comp–Att–Int	32–42–3	11–16–120
Time of possession	26:40	33:20

Team	Category	Player	Statistics
Georgia Southern	Passing	Davis Brin	32/42, 350 yards, 2 TD, 3 INT
Georgia Southern	Rushing	David Mbadinga	4 rushes, 44 yards, 1 TD
Georgia Southern	Receiving	Derwin Burgess Jr.	6 receptions, 117 yards
Ohio	Passing	Parker Navarro	11/16, 120 yards, 1 TD
Ohio	Rushing	Rickey Hunt	17 rushes, 115 yards, 4 TD
Ohio	Receiving	Sam Wiglusz	5 receptions, 64 yards
