= JC French =

American football player (born 2003)

No. 4 – Cincinnati Bearcats
- Position: Quarterback
- Class: (redshirt) Senior

Personal information
- Born: December 4, 2003 (age 22)
- Listed height: 6 ft 1 in (1.85 m)
- Listed weight: 205 lb (93 kg)

Career information
- High school: Blessed Trinity (Roswell, Georgia)
- College: Memphis (2022); Georgia Southern (2023–2025); Cincinnati (2026–present)
- Stats at ESPN

James Charles French IV (born December 4, 2003) is an American college football quarterback for the Cincinnati Bearcats. He previously played for the Memphis Tigers and Georgia Southern Eagles.

== Early life ==
French attended Blessed Trinity Catholic High School in Roswell, Georgia. A three-star recruit, he committed to play college football at the University of Memphis over offers from Arkansas State, Virginia Tech, and Tulane.

== College career ==
=== Memphis ===
French redshirted as a freshman at Memphis, before entering the transfer portal.

=== Georgia Southern ===
He transferred to Georgia Southern University to play for the Georgia Southern Eagles. After playing sparingly his first season with the Eagles, French was named the team's starting quarterback entering the 2024 season. In his first career start against Boise State, he threw for 322 yards and two touchdowns in a 56–45 defeat. In his first year as a starter, French completed 269 of his passes for 2,831 yards and 17 touchdowns against 11 interceptions while adding 238 yards and 2 touchdowns on the ground.

=== Cincinnati ===
On January 6, 2026, French announced that he would transfer to the University of Cincinnati to play for the Cincinnati Bearcats.

=== Statistics ===
Season	Team	Games			Passing								Rushing			
Season	Team	GP	GS	Record	Cmp	Att	Pct	Yds	Avg	TD	Int	Rtg	Att	Yds	Avg	TD
2022	Memphis	DNP														
2023	Georgia Southern	10	0	—	13	16	81.3	122	7.6	1	1	153.4	14	48	3.4	0
2024	Georgia Southern	13	13	8–5	269	410	65.6	2,831	6.9	17	11	131.9	118	238	2.0	2
2025	Georgia Southern	13	13	7–6	248	389	63.8	2,929	7.5	20	8	139.9	133	315	2.4	6
2026	Cincinnati	7	7	5–2	127	183	69.4	1,510	8.3	13	2	160.0	75	291	3.9	6
Career		36	26	15−11	530	815	65.0	5,882	7.2	38	20	136.1	339	903	2.7	14
