= Davis Brin =

American football player (born 2000)

No. 7, 5
- Position: Quarterback

Personal information
- Born: February 7, 2000 (age 26); San Antonio, Texas, U.S.
- Listed height: 6 ft 2 in (1.88 m)
- Listed weight: 210 lb (95 kg)

Career information
- High school: Champion (Boerne, Texas)
- College: Tulsa (2018–2022); Georgia Southern (2023)
- NFL draft: 2024: undrafted

Davis William Brin (born February 7, 2000) is an American former football quarterback. He played college football for the Tulsa Golden Hurricane and the Georgia Southern Eagles.

== Early life ==
Brin grew up in Boerne, Texas, and attended Samuel V. Champion High School where he played football and track & field. During high school, he was named first-team Academic All-State and the District 26-5A Offensive MVP as a senior. He ended his high school football career with a total of 6,550 passing yards and 58 touchdowns. He was rated a three-star recruit and committed to play college football at Tulsa over offers from schools such as Bowling Green, Fordham, Holy Cross, Louisiana–Monroe, New Mexico State, North Texas, Rice, Sam Houston State, San Diego State, Texas State, Toledo and UTSA.

== College career ==
=== Tulsa ===
Brin was an early enrollee in January 2018. During his true freshman season, he was redshirted and played only one game against UConn and completed only one rushing attempt. During the 2019 season, he played in one only game which was against East Carolina. During the 2020 season, he played in two games and completed 19 out of 29 passing attempts for 268 yards and two touchdowns. During the Week 6 game against Tulane, he threw a 37-yard hail mary pass to JC Santana to tie the score. Because of his performance, he was named the AAC's Co-Offensive Player of the Week and was named one of eight quarterbacks as a Manning Award "Star of the Week." During the 2021 season, Brin was named AAC offensive player of the week after his performance during the Week 4 game against Arkansas State where he completed 17 out of 25 passing attempts for 355 yards and three touchdowns. He finished the season with starting all 13 games, completing 244 out of 411 passing attempts for 3,269 yards and 18 touchdowns. During the 2022 season, Brin was named AAC Offensive Player of the Week after his performance during the Week 2 game against Northern Illinois where he completed 19 out 32 passing attempts for 322 yards and four touchdowns. He finished the season with playing in 9 out of 12 games while missing three of them due to an injury, completing 148 out of 250 passing attempts for 2,138 yards and 17 touchdowns.

On November 28, 2022, Brin announced that he was entering the transfer portal. On January 2, 2023, he announced that he would be transferring to Georgia Southern.

=== Georgia Southern ===
During the 2023 season, Brin was named the Sun Belt Conference Offensive Player of the Week after his performance during the Week 2 game against UAB after completing 38 out of 47 passing attempts for 318 yards and two touchdowns, making it the second-most completions made by a quarterback in Clay Helton's head coaching history and tied for the second-most completions in the program's history.

=== College statistics ===
Year	Team	Games			Passing								Rushing			
Year	Team	GP	GS	Record	Cmp	Att	Pct	Yds	Avg	TD	Int	Rtg	Att	Yds	Avg	TD
2018	Tulsa	1	0	—	0	0	0.0	0	0.0	0	0	0.0	1	0	0.0	0
2019	Tulsa	1	0	—	0	0	0.0	0	0.0	0	0	0.0	0	0	0.0	0
2020	Tulsa	2	0	—	19	29	65.5	268	9.2	2	0	165.9	4	11	2.8	1
2021	Tulsa	13	13	7–6	243	410	59.3	3,254	7.9	18	16	132.6	68	75	1.1	1
2022	Tulsa	9	9	3–6	148	250	59.2	2,138	8.6	17	8	147.1	48	−77	−1.6	2
2023	Georgia Southern	13	13	6–7	362	552	65.6	3,781	6.8	24	19	130.6	74	−60	−0.8	1
Career		39	35	16–19	773	1,242	62.2	9,431	7.6	61	43	135.3	194	−53	−0.3	5

== Professional career ==
On May 10, 2024, Brin received a rookie minicamp invite by the Houston Texans, but was not signed.
