= Antonio Henton =

American football player (born 1987)

No. 7
- Position: Quarterback

Personal information
- Born: May 20, 1987 (age 39); Fort Valley, Georgia, U.S.
- Listed height: 6 ft 2 in (1.88 m)
- Listed weight: 232 lb (105 kg)

Career information
- High school: Fort Valley (GA) Peach County
- College: Fort Valley State
- NFL draft: 2013: undrafted

Antonio Henton (born May 20, 1987) is a former quarterback at Georgia Southern University. He played high school football for Peach County High School.

== Early life ==
Henton was a standout quarterback for the Peach County High School football team in his hometown of Fort Valley, Georgia. As a junior, Henton earned an All-State Honorable Mention after passing for 1,810 yards with 19 touchdowns and only five interceptions. Henton was Georgia Offensive Player of the Year in 2005. Antonio Henton missed the first three games of his senior season (all of which Peach County lost.) Henton returned in Week 4, however, and proceeded to lead his team to a 12–3 record and the state title.

== College career ==
Henton redshirted as a freshman in 2006 with the Ohio State Buckeyes and was a member of the practice squad. He played backup for Todd Boeckman in 2007 and subsequently saw little playing time, completing only 3 passes for 57 yards and one touchdown. As of June 25, 2008 Antonio Henton transferred from The Ohio State University to Georgia Southern University where he played for his old high school coach, Rance Gillespie. Henton transferred out of Georgia Southern after the 2008 season, possibly because Lee Chapple (who shared time at quarterback) started the final game of the season against Furman and posted 323 yards through the air and 2 touchdowns, leaving Chapple to be the front runner for the 2009 season.

=== Passing ===
Year	Games	Attempts	Completions	Comp %	Yards	TDs	Interception	QB rating
2007	3	6	3	50.0%	57	1	0	184.4
Career	3	6	3	50.0%	57	1	0	184.4

=== Rushing ===
Year	Games	Rushes	Yards	Average	Touchdowns
2007	3	9	57	4.6	0
Career	3	9	57	4.6	0
