= Camden Brown =

American football player (born 2004)

No. 80 – Dallas Cowboys
- Position: Wide receiver
- Roster status: Active

Personal information
- Born: May 6, 2004 (age 22); Monroe, Louisiana, U.S.
- Listed height: 6 ft 2 in (1.88 m)
- Listed weight: 204 lb (93 kg)

Career information
- High school: St. Thomas Aquinas (Fort Lauderdale, Florida)
- College: Auburn (2022–2024); Georgia Southern (2025)
- NFL draft: 2026: undrafted

Career history
- Dallas Cowboys (2026–present)

Awards and highlights
- Sun Belt Newcomer of the Year (2025); First-team All-Sun Belt (2025)

Career NFL statistics as of Week 7, 2026
- Games played: 1
- Stats at Pro Football Reference

Camden O. Brown (born May 6, 2004) is an American professional football wide receiver for the Dallas Cowboys of the National Football League (NFL). He played college football for the Auburn Tigers and Georgia Southern Eagles.

== Early life ==
Brown grew up in Monroe, Louisiana. He attended St. Thomas Aquinas High School in Fort Lauderdale, Florida, and originally committed to play college football for the Pittsburgh Panthers. However, Brown ultimately de-committed from the Panthers, flipping his commitment to play for the Auburn Tigers.

== College career ==
In three years at Auburn from 2022 to 2024, Brown totaled 26 receptions for 289 yards and three touchdowns. After the 2024 season, he entered the NCAA transfer portal. Brown transferred to play for the Georgia Southern Eagles. He finished the 2025 season with 65 receptions for 1,079 yards and 14 touchdowns.

== Professional career ==
Pre-draft measurables
Height	Weight	Arm length	Hand span	Wingspan	40-yard dash	10-yard split	20-yard split	20-yard shuttle	Three-cone drill	Vertical jump	Broad jump	Bench press
6 ft 2 1/8 in (1.88 m)	204 lb (93 kg)	32 in (0.81 m)	8 5/8 in (0.22 m)	6 ft 6 1/4 in (1.99 m)	4.59 s	1.48 s	2.70 s	4.45 s	7.42 s	37.0 in (0.94 m)	9 ft 10 in (3.00 m)	20 reps
All values from Pro Day

After going unselected in the 2026 NFL draft, Brown signed a 3-year, $3 million contract with the Dallas Cowboys as an undrafted free agent. In his first NFL preseason game, he recorded three receptions for 62 yards and two touchdowns in a win over the Seattle Seahawks.

=== Regular season ===
Year	Team	Games		Receiving					Rushing					Fumbles	
Year	Team	GP	GS	Rec	Yds	Avg	Lng	TD	Att	Yds	Avg	Lng	TD	Fum	Lost
2026	DAL	0	0	0	0	0.0	0	0	0	0	0.0	0	0	0	0
Career		0	0	0	0	0.0	0	0	0	0	0.0	0	0	0	0
