= Brandon Bailey (American football) =

American football coach (born 1994)

Current position
- Title: Safeties coach
- Team: James Madison
- Conference: Sun Belt

Biographical details
- Born: August 19, 1994 (age 31); Perry, Georgia, U.S.

Coaching career (HC unless noted)
- 2013–2015: Georgia Southern (SA)
- 2016: Tulane (GA)
- 2017: Richmond Hill HS (GA) (co-DC/LB)
- 2018: Arkansas–Monticello (DB)
- 2019–2020: Texas A&M (GA)
- 2021: Texas A&M (defensive analyst)
- 2022: Buffalo (DC/S)
- 2023–2025: Georgia Southern (DC/LB)
- 2026–present: James Madison (S)

Brandon J. Bailey (born August 19, 1994) is an American college football coach who is currently the safeties coach for the James Madison Dukes. He was the defensive coordinator and linebackers coach for Georgia Southern University, a position he held since 2024. Bailey was fired after the final game of the 2025 campaign.

== Early life and college ==
Bailey grew up in Macon, Georgia and graduated from Georgia Southern University with a bachelor's degree in health and physical education in May 2016. He also worked with the Eagles football program as a student assistant while he attended college.

== Coaching career ==
Bailey started his coaching career at Tulane where he served as a graduate assistant. From there he would go to Richmond Hill High School as their Co-Defensive Coordinator and linebackers coach where he would stay for one year. Next Arkansas–Monticello hired Bailey as their defensive backs coach where he would coach during the 2018 season. He was also their defensive coordinator for the first seven games of the season helping them to a 5–2 record. His next stop would be with the Texas A&M Aggies as a graduate assistant, a position he would hold with the Aggies for one year. He then became a defensive analyst for the Aggies for the 2021 season. On January 27, 2022, Bailey was hired by the Buffalo Bulls as their defensive coordinator, becoming the youngest Division I defensive coordinator. Bailey led the Buffalo defense that finished in fourth in the MAC in scoring. Buffalo also forced 28 turnovers on the year, more than double as many as the previous season, and the Bulls also finished second in the FBS with 15 fumbles recovered and tied for the league lead in interceptions with an outstanding number of 13, the 28 takeaways were the seventh most in the whole country. He also helped safety Marcus Fuqua tie for the national lead in interceptions with seven in route to being named to the Associated Press All-America Third Team, becoming just the third Buffalo player to achieve an AP All-American in the Bulls FBS era. Then after his one outstanding year with the Bulls, he was hired by Georgia Southern as their defensive coordinator and linebackers coach.

Throughout his coaching career, Bailey maintained a defensive philosophy built on relentless physicality and a level of preparation that bordered on obsessive.
