= Laron Scott =

American football player (born 1987)

No. 34
- Position: Defensive back / kick returner

Personal information
- Born: July 12, 1987 (age 39); Warner Robins, Georgia, U.S.
- Listed height: 5 ft 9 in (1.75 m)
- Listed weight: 184 lb (83 kg)

Career information
- High school: Warner Robins (GA)
- College: Georgia Southern
- NFL draft: 2012: undrafted

Career history
- New Orleans Saints (2012)*; New York Giants (2012−2013)*; Montreal Alouettes (2014); Los Angeles KISS (2015–2016)
- * Offseason or practice squad member only

Career AFL statistics
- Tackles: 23
- Pass breakups: 4
- Forced fumbles: 1
- Interceptions: 1
- Total TDs: 2
- Stats at Pro Football Reference

Laron Scott (born July 12, 1987) is an American former professional football cornerback. He began his pro career as an undrafted free agent with the New York Giants.

== Professional career ==
=== New York Giants ===
Scott signed a one-year, $2.99 million contract with the Giants on August 16, 2012. On August 11, 2012, he made his preseason debut against the New England Patriots and made his first NFL interception in the fourth quarter with 16 seconds to go. On August 25, 2013, he was waived by the Giants and subsequently placed on season-ending injured reserve.

=== Los Angeles KISS ===
Scott was assigned to the Los Angeles KISS of the Arena Football League on March 5, 2015. On November 4, 2015, the KISS picked up Scott's rookie option for 2016.
