= Jayson Foster =

American football player (born 1985)

No. 80
- Position: Wide receiver

Personal information
- Born: July 22, 1985 (age 41); Canton, Georgia, U.S.
- Listed height: 5 ft 9 in (1.75 m)
- Listed weight: 180 lb (82 kg)

Career information
- College: Georgia Southern
- NFL draft: 2008: undrafted

Career history
- Miami Dolphins (2008)*; Pittsburgh Steelers (2008)*; Denver Broncos (2008–2009)*; Pittsburgh Steelers (2009)*; Baltimore Ravens (2009)*; Sacramento Mountain Lions (2011); Montreal Alouettes (2012)
- * Offseason or practice squad member only

Awards and highlights
- SoCon Freshman of the Year (2004); SoCon Offensive Player of the Year (2007); Walter Payton Award (2007)

Jayson D. Foster (born July 22, 1985) is an American former professional football player who was a wide receiver in the National Football League (NFL), United Football League (UFL), and Canadian Football League (CFL). He was signed by the Miami Dolphins as an undrafted free agent in 2008. He played college football at Georgia Southern and was the 2007 Walter Payton Award winner. Foster was also a member of the Denver Broncos, Pittsburgh Steelers, Baltimore Ravens, Florida Tuskers, Sacramento Mountain Lions and Montreal Alouettes.

== Early life ==
A three-year football letterman for Cherokee High School in Canton, Georgia for head coach Brian Dameron, Foster rushed for 1,700 yards and passed for 700 yards while accounting for 25 offensive touchdowns as a senior. He was selected as Cherokee County's ‘Offensive Player of the Year’ and was picked to all-county, all-region and all-state squads in 2002. He was also named Region 6-5A ‘Player of the Year.’ He was named an all-county and all-region (honorable mention) choice as a quarterback in 2001 rushing for 1,200 yards (10.3 ypr) and eight TDs while passing for another three scores. He was voted as the school's ‘Offensive Player of the Year’ as a sophomore and junior. He garnered all-county and all-region accolades while earning selection as county's ‘Offensive Player of the Year’ as a sophomore wide receiver netting 884 reception yards and 11 TDs on 42 catches in 2000. He maintained a 3.73 grade point average throughout high school career.

== College career ==
Foster was named ‘Freshman of the Year’ by the Southern Conference head coaches. He played in all 12 games starting three times at wide receiver. He was the only Eagle to ever score a touchdown five different ways: rushing, passing, receiving, punt return and kickoff return.

During his Sophomore year, as starting quarterback, Foster set a conference record rushing for a touchdown in all 12 games, the only player in I-AA to accomplish that feat. He rushed for 1,481 yards which was the third-most rushing yards by a quarterback in NCAA I-FCS history. He led the Eagle offense to its fifth straight I-FCS rushing title, averaging 387 yards on the ground and the team ranked sixth nationally in scoring offense (38 ppg) and eighth in passing efficiency and total offense. Individually, he ranked 10th in rushing (123.4 ypg), 55th in total offense, third in scoring (126 points) and 34th in all-purpose yards.

During his Junior year, former Coach Brian VanGorder switched Foster from quarterback to wide receiver. Nevertheless, Foster was named First-team All-SoCon (wide receiver by the coaches, return specialist by the media association)and Second-team All-SoCon (return specialist as voted by the coaches). He became the only player in school history with at least an 80-yard rush, reception, punt return and kickoff return.

During his senior year, Foster retook the helm at quarterback and led his Eagles to a 7–4 mark and captured the 2007 Walter Payton Award. He was also named the Southern Conference Offensive Player of the Year. Foster compiled a school record 3,047 yards of total offense, breaking that of College Football Hall of Famer Tracy Ham. Foster also ranked second nationally in rushing yards per game (167.6).

He graduated in December 2007 with a degree in Logistics and Intermodal Transportation.

== Professional career ==
=== Miami Dolphins ===
After going undrafted in the 2008 NFL draft, Foster was signed by the Miami Dolphins as an undrafted free agent. He was waived by the Dolphins on August 30 during final cuts but was re-signed to the team's practice squad a day later. He was released from the practice squad on September 2.

=== First stint with Steelers ===
Foster was signed to the practice squad of the Pittsburgh Steelers on October 14, 2008 after the team released defensive end Jordan Reffett. He was released on November 7 to make room for running back Justin Vincent.

=== Denver Broncos ===
Foster was signed to the practice squad of the Denver Broncos on November 26, 2008. He was waived on April 28, 2009.

=== Second stint with Steelers ===
Foster was re-signed by the Pittsburgh Steelers on May 1, 2009. Foster was released by the Steelers again on June 18, 2009.

=== Baltimore Ravens ===
Foster signed with the Baltimore Ravens on July 28, 2009. He was one of the final cuts on September 5, 2009.
