= List of Coastal Carolina Chanticleers football seasons =

The following is a list of seasons completed by the Coastal Carolina Chanticleers football team. The Chanticleers currently compete in the Sun Belt Conference, which participates in the NCAA Division I Football Bowl Subdivision (FBS). From the start of its football program in 2003 through 2016, Coastal was part of the Division I Football Championship Subdivision (FCS). From 2003 through 2015, Coastal was a member of the Big South Conference. In 2015, Coastal announced that it would start a transition to FBS in 2016, joining the Sun Belt Conference for all sports except football. The 2016 football season was played as an FCS independent, and in 2017 the Chanticleers joined Sun Belt football, though they were not eligible for the conference championship or bowl games until they became full FBS members in 2018.

The program began in 2003, but in the 19 seasons from through 2021, Coastal won seven conference championships, five as co-champions and two outright. They also qualified for the FCS playoffs six times, with quarterfinal appearances in 2013 and 2014.

The Chanticleers have had four head coaches in their brief history. David Bennett led the team for its first nine years, compiling a 63–39 record. Bennett was succeeded by Joe Moglia, who in six years compiled a 56–22 record. During the 2017 season, Moglia took a leave due to medical issues, and was replaced by interim head coach Jamey Chadwell, who guided the Chanticleers to a 3–9 record in their first season of Sun Belt play. Coastal Carolina beceame bowl-eligible in 2018, and Chadwell became the program's third head coach on January 18, 2019. Upon Chadwell's departure to take the head coaching position at Liberty at the end of the 2022 regular season, defensive coordinator Chad Staggs led the Chanticleers in the Birmingham Bowl before being succeeded by NC State offensive coordinator Tim Beck.

== Seasons ==
Legend

^{†} Conference champions
^{‡} Division champions
Bowl game berth
Playoff berth

List of Coastal Carolina Chanticleers football seasons
Season	Team	Head coach	Conference	Division	Regular season results							Postseason results	Final ranking	
Season	Team	Head coach	Conference	Division	Overall			Conference				Bowl game/Playoff result	AP/STATS Poll	Coaches' Poll
Season	Team	Head coach	Conference	Division	Win	Loss	Tie	Win	Loss	Tie	Finish	Bowl game/Playoff result	AP/STATS Poll	Coaches' Poll
Coastal Carolina Chanticleers
2003	2003	David Bennett	Big South	—	6	5		1	3		4th	—	—	—
2004	2004^{†}	David Bennett	Big South	—	10	1		4	0		1st	—	24	24
2005	2005^{†}	David Bennett	Big South	—	9	2		3	1		T–1st	—	24	23
2006	2006^{†}	David Bennett	Big South	—	9	3		4	0		1st	NCAA Division I FCS Playoffs – First Round	14	9
2007	2007	David Bennett	Big South	—	5	6		3	1		2nd	—	—	—
2008	2008	David Bennett	Big South	—	6	6		1	4		T–6th	—	—	—
2009	2009	David Bennett	Big South	—	5	6		3	3		T–4th	—	—	—
2010	2010^{†}	David Bennett	Big South	—	6	6		5	1		T–1st	NCAA Division I FCS Playoffs – First Round	—	—
2011	2011	David Bennett	Big South	—	7	4		3	3		T–3rd	—	—	—
2012	2012^{†}	Joe Moglia	Big South	—	8	5		5	1		T–1st	NCAA Division I FCS Playoffs – Second Round	24	24
2013	2013^{†}	Joe Moglia	Big South	—	12	3		4	1		T–1st	NCAA Division I FCS Playoffs – Quarterfinals	7	7
2014	2014^{†}	Joe Moglia	Big South	—	12	2		4	1		T–1st	NCAA Division I FCS Playoffs – Quarterfinals	—	—
2015	2015	Joe Moglia	Big South	—	9	3		4	2		2nd	NCAA Division I FCS Playoffs – First Round	16	17
2016	2016	Joe Moglia	FCS Independent	—	10	2		—	—		—	—	15	—
2017	2017	Jamey Chadwell	Sun Belt	—	3	9		2	6		T–10th	—	—	—
2018	2018	Joe Moglia	Sun Belt	East	5	7		2	6		T–7th	—	—	—
2019	2019	Jamey Chadwell	Sun Belt	East	5	7		2	6		T–8th	—	—	—
2020	2020 ^{†}	Jamey Chadwell	Sun Belt	East	11	1		8	0		T–1st	Cure Bowl: L Liberty, 34-37 (OT)	14	14
2021	2021	Jamey Chadwell	Sun Belt	East	11	2		6	2		T–2nd	Cure Bowl: W Northern Illinois, 47-41	—	—
2022	2022 ^{‡}	Jamey Chadwell (regular season); Chad Staggs (bowl)	Sun Belt	East	9	4		6	2		1st	Birmingham Bowl: L East Carolina, 29-53	—	—
2023	2023	Tim Beck	Sun Belt	East	8	5		5	3		T–3rd	Hawaii Bowl: W San Jose State, 24-14	—	—
2024	2024	Tim Beck	Sun Belt	East	6	7		3	5		T–5th (East)	Myrtle Beach Bowl: L UTSA, 15-44	—	—
2025	2025	Tim Beck	Sun Belt	East	6	7		5	3		3rd (East)	Independence Bowl: L Louisiana Tech, 14-23	—	—
Totals					All-time: 178–103 (.633)			Conference: 83–54 (.606)			—	Postseason: 6–10 (.375)	—	—
