= 2022 Coastal Carolina Chanticleers football team =

American college football season

2022 Coastal Carolina Chanticleers football

Sun Belt East Division co-champion

Sun Belt Championship, L 26–45 vs. Troy

Birmingham Bowl, L 29–53 vs. East Carolina
- Conference: Sun Belt Conference
- East Division
- Record: 9–4 (6–2 Sun Belt)
- Head coach: Jamey Chadwell (5th season; first 12 games); Chad Staggs (interim, bowl game)
- Co-offensive coordinators: Newland Isaac (4th season); Willy Korn (4th season)
- Offensive scheme: Up-tempo spread
- Defensive coordinator: Chad Staggs (4th season)
- Base defense: 4–2–5
- Captains: Aaron Bedgood; Lance Boykin; Jerrod Clark; Grayson McCall
- Home stadium: Brooks Stadium

2022 Sun Belt Conference football standings
	Conf.			Overall
Team	W		L	W		L
East Division
James Madison* x	6	–	2	8	–	3
Coastal Carolina xy	6	–	2	9	–	4
Marshall	5	–	3	9	–	4
Georgia Southern	3	–	5	6	–	7
Appalachian State	3	–	5	6	–	6
Georgia State	3	–	5	4	–	8
Old Dominion	2	–	6	3	–	9
West Division
No. 19 Troy xy$	7	–	1	12	–	2
South Alabama x	7	–	1	10	–	3
Southern Miss	4	–	4	7	–	6
Louisiana	4	–	4	6	–	7
Louisiana–Monroe	3	–	5	4	–	8
Texas State	2	–	6	4	–	8
Arkansas State	1	–	7	3	–	9
Championship: Troy 45, Coastal Carolina 26
$ – Conference champion; x – Division champion/co-champions; y – Championship game participant; * – Ineligible for postseason play due to FCS-to-FBS transition rules; Rankings from AP Poll

The 2022 Coastal Carolina Chanticleers football team represented Coastal Carolina University as a member of the East Division of the Sun Belt Conference during the 2022 NCAA Division I FBS football season. The Chanticleers compiled an overall record of 9–4 with a mark of 6–2 in conference play, sharing the Sun Belt East Division title with James Madison. Coastal Carolina advanced to the Sun Belt Conference Football Championship Game, losing to Troy. The Chanticleers were invited to the Birmingham Bowl, where they lost to East Carolina. Fifth-year head coach Jamey Chadwell led the team through the regular season and the conference championship game before resigning to become the head football coach at Liberty University. Chad Staggs served as interim head coach for the team's bowl game. Coastal Carolina played home games at Brooks Stadium in Conway, South Carolina.

== Preseason ==
=== Media poll ===
The Sun Belt media days were held on July 25 and July 26. The Chanticleers were predicted to finish in second place in the Sun Belt's East Division. Coastal Carolina also received 2-of-14 first place votes.

=== Sun Belt Preseason All-Conference teams ===
Offense

Player of the Year

- Grayson McCall – Quarterback, RS-JR

1st team

- Grayson McCall – Quarterback, RS-JR
- Willie Lampkin – Offensive Lineman, JR

Defense

Player of the Year

- Josaiah Stewart – Defensive Lineman, SO

1st team

- Josaiah Stewart – Defensive Lineman, SO
- D'Jordan Strong – Defensive Back, Super SR

2nd team

- Jerrod Clark – Defensive Lineman, RS-SR

== Schedule ==
All conference games were announced in early March 2022.

Date	Time	Opponent	Site	TV	Result	Attendance
September 3	7:00 p.m.	Army*	Brooks Stadium; Conway, SC	ESPN+	W 38–28	21,165
September 10	6:00 p.m.	Gardner–Webb*	Brooks Stadium; Conway, SC	ESPN+	W 31–27	12,261
September 17	1:00 p.m.	Buffalo*	Brooks Stadium; Conway, SC	ESPN+	W 38–26	13,372
September 22	7:30 p.m.	at Georgia State	Center Parc Stadium; Atlanta, GA	ESPN2	W 41–24	13,467
October 1	7:00 p.m.	Georgia Southern	Brooks Stadium; Conway, SC	ESPN+	W 34–30	18,756
October 8	8:00 p.m.	at Louisiana–Monroe	Malone Stadium; Monroe, LA	ESPN+	W 28–21	18,448
October 15	12:00 p.m.	Old Dominion^{†}	Brooks Stadium; Conway, SC	ESPNU	L 21–49	16,814
October 29	7:00 p.m.	at Marshall	Joan C. Edwards Stadium; Huntington, WV	NFLN	W 24–13	24,954
November 3	7:30 p.m.	Appalachian State	Brooks Stadium; Conway, SC	ESPN	W 35–28	21,224
November 12	7:30 p.m.	Southern Miss	Brooks Stadium; Conway, SC	ESPNU	W 26–23	16,203
November 19	3:30 p.m.	at Virginia*	Scott Stadium; Charlottesville, VA	ACCRSN	Canceled^{[a]}	
November 26	12:00 p.m.	at James Madison	Bridgeforth Stadium; Harrisonburg, VA	ESPNU	L 7–47	19,393
December 3	3:30 p.m.	at Troy	Veterans Memorial Stadium; Troy, AL (Sun Belt Championship Game)	ESPN	L 26–45	21,554
December 27	6:45 p.m.	vs. East Carolina*	Protective Stadium; Birmingham, AL (Birmingham Bowl)	ESPN	L 29–53	15,901
*Non-conference game; ^{†}Homecoming

== Rankings ==
Ranking movements Legend: ██ Increase in ranking ██ Decrease in ranking — = Not ranked RV = Received votes
	Week															
Poll	Pre	1	2	3	4	5	6	7	8	9	10	11	12	13	14	Final
AP	—	—	—	—	—	RV	RV	—	—	RV	RV	23	23	RV	—	
Coaches	RV	—	—	RV	RV	RV	RV	RV	RV	RV	RV	23	23	RV	RV	
CFP	Not released									—	—	—	—	—		Not released

== Game summaries ==
=== Army ===
Army at Coastal Carolina

Team	1	2	3	4	Total
Black Knights	7	7	7	7	28
• Chanticleers	7	7	10	14	38

- Date: September 3, 2022
- Location: Brooks Stadium
  Conway, SC
- Game start: 7:02 p.m. EDT
- Elapsed time: 3 hours and 13 minutes
- Game attendance: 21,165
- Game weather: Sunny
- Referee: Ted Pitts
- TV announcers (ESPN+): Kyle Rush (play-by-play) and Nate Ross (analyst)

Scoring summary
1	07:25	ARMY	Tyrell Robinson 70-yard rush (Quinn Maretzki kick) (4 plays, 84 yards, 1:43)	ARMY 7–0
1	00:54	CCU	Reese White 6-yard pass from Grayson McCall (Kade Hensley kick) (12 plays, 84 yards, 6:24)	TIE 7–7
2	12:21	CCU	Sam Pinckney 26-yard pass from Grayson McCall (Kade Hensley kick) (6 plays, 65 yards, 2:33)	CCU 14–7
2	03:09	ARMY	Jakobi Buchanan 1-yard rush (Quinn Maretzki kick) (15 plays, 75 yards, 9:12)	TIE 14–14
3	08:30	CCU	Kade Hensley 25-yard field goal (13 plays, 68 yards, 6:30)	CCU 17–14
3	05:23	ARMY	Ay'Juan Marshall 54-yard pass from Tyhier Tyler (Quinn Maretzki kick) (6 plays, 75 yards, 3:07)	ARMY 21–17
3	01:27	CCU	Reese White 14-yard pass from Grayson McCall (Kade Hensley kick) (8 plays, 65 yards, 3:56)	CCU 24–21
4	09:51	CCU	Reese White 2-yard rush (Kade Hensley kick) (11 plays, 56 yards, 5:09)	CCU 31–21
4	08:58	ARMY	Braheam Murphy 73-yard pass from Cade Ballard (Quinn Maretzki kick) (2 plays, 75 yards, 0:53)	CCU 31–28
4	03:01	CCU	Grayson McCall 5-yard rush (Kade Hensley kick) (10 plays, 75 yards, 5:57)	CCU 38–28

Statistics	Army	Coastal Carolina
First downs	11	30
Total yards	344	437
Rushing yards	202	263
Passing yards	142	174
Turnovers	1	0
Time of possession	23:44	36:16

Team	Category	Player	Statistics
Army	Passing	Cade Ballard	3/5, 88 yards, 1 TD
Army	Rushing	Tyrell Robinson	9 carries, 135 yards, 1 TD
Army	Receiving	Braheam Murphy	1 reception, 73 yards, 1 TD
Coastal Carolina	Passing	Grayson McCall	12/17, 174 yards, 3 TDs
Coastal Carolina	Rushing	Reese White	21 carries, 133 yards, 1 TD
Coastal Carolina	Receiving	Sam Pinckney	3 receptions, 69 yards, 1 TD

=== Gardner-Webb ===
	1	2	3	4	Total
Runnin' Bulldogs	0	10	10	7	27
Chanticleers	3	14	7	7	31

=== Buffalo ===
	1	2	3	4	Total
Bulls	6	10	3	7	26
Chanticleers	7	7	3	21	38

=== At Georgia State ===
	1	2	3	4	Total
Chanticleers	21	6	7	7	41
Panthers	7	10	0	7	24

=== Georgia Southern ===
	1	2	3	4	Total
Eagles	0	7	10	13	30
Chanticleers	7	0	7	20	34

=== At Louisiana–Monroe ===
	1	2	3	4	Total
Chanticleers	14	14	0	0	28
Warhawks	7	7	7	0	21

=== Old Dominion ===
	1	2	3	4	Total
Monarchs	7	7	21	14	49
Chanticleers	0	7	7	7	21

Statistics

Statistics	ODU	CCU
First downs	23	23
Total yards	525	454
Rushing yards	324	88
Passing yards	201	366
Turnovers	0	1
Time of possession	23:02	36:58

Team	Category	Player	Statistics
Old Dominion	Passing	Hayden Wolff	12/16, 184 yards, 2 TD
Old Dominion	Rushing	Blake Watson	19 rushes, 259 yards, 3 TD
Old Dominion	Receiving	Ali Jennings III	6 receptions, 87 yards, TD
Coastal Carolina	Passing	Grayson McCall	26/34, 358 yards, 3 TD
Coastal Carolina	Rushing	Reese White	10 rushes, 46 yards
Coastal Carolina	Receiving	Sam Pinckney	7 receptions, 113 yards

=== At Marshall ===
Game Eight – Coastal Carolina Chanticleers (6–1) at Marshall Thundering Herd (4–3)

Quarter	1	2	3	4	Total
Chanticleers	21	0	0	3	24
Thundering Herd	0	10	3	0	13

at Joan C. Edwards Stadium • Huntington, West Virginia

- Date: Saturday, October 29, 2022
- Game time: 7:00 p.m. EDT
- Game weather: Sunny
- Game attendance: 24,954
- Referee: Ted Pitts
- TV announcers (NFLN): Jason Ross Jr. (play-by-play), Tyoka Jackson (analyst)

Game information

First quarter

- (9:52) CCU – Grayson McCall 2 yard run, Kade Hensley kick (Drive: 11 plays, 76 yards, 5:02; Coastal Carolina 7–0)
- (4:23) CCU – Bryce Carpenter 3 yard run, Kade Hensley kick (Drive: 7 plays, 49 yards, 3:49; Coastal Carolina 14–0)
- (1:03) CCU – Jacob Jenkins 37 yard pass from Grayson McCall, Kade Hensley kick (Drive: 4 plays, 65 yards, 2:03; Coastal Carolina 21–0)

Second quarter

- (7:17) MRSH – Khalan Laborn 2 yard run, Rece Verhoff kick (Drive: 6 plays, 75 yards, 2:06; Coastal Carolina 21–7)
- (4:23) MRSH – Rece Verhoff 40 yard field goal (Drive: 8 plays, 45 yards, 1:58; Coastal Carolina 21–10)

Third quarter

- (2:49) MRSH – Rece Verhoff 39 yard field goal (Drive: 9 plays, 44 yards, 3:03; Coastal Carolina 21–13)

Fourth quarter

- (11:28) CCU – Kade Hensley 27 yard field goal (Drive: 9 plays, 27 yards, 3:42; Coastal Carolina 24–13)

Statistics	CCU	MRSH
First downs	21	20
Plays–yards	69–271	74–407
Rushes–yards	45–150	37–87
Passing yards	121	320
Passing: comp–att–int	13–24–0	19–37–0
Turnovers		
Time of possession	35:00	25:00

Team	Category	Player	Statistics
Coastal Carolina	Passing	Grayson McCall	13/24, 121 yards, 1 TD
Coastal Carolina	Rushing	Reese White	6 carries, 43 yards
Coastal Carolina	Receiving	Jared Brown	6 receptions, 57 yards
Marshall	Passing	Cam Fancher	19/36, 320 yards
Marshall	Rushing	Khalan Laborn	16 carries, 59 yards, 1 TD
Marshall	Receiving	Corey Gammage	8 receptions, 187 yards

=== Appalachian State ===
Appalachian State Mountaineers at Coastal Carolina Chanticleers – Game summary

Quarter	1	2	3	4	Total
Mountaineers	7	7	0	14	28
Chanticleers	14	7	0	14	35

at Brooks Stadium, Conway, South Carolina

- Date: November 3
- Game time: 7:30 p.m. EST
- Game weather: Sunny
- Game attendance: 21,224
- Referee: Wayne Winkler
- TV announcers (ESPN): Matt Barrie, Louis Riddick, Harry Lyles Jr.

Statistics

Statistics	APP	CCU
First downs	16	23
Total yards	367	476
Rushing yards	88	192
Passing yards	279	284
Turnovers	2	1
Time of possession	22:04	37:56

Team	Category	Player	Statistics
Appalachian State	Passing	Chase Brice	19/28, 279 yards, 2 TD, 1 INT
Appalachian State	Rushing	Nate Noel	6 carries, 31 yards
Appalachian State	Receiving	Christian Horn	4 receptions, 57 yards
Coastal Carolina	Passing	Grayson McCall	18/26, 253 yards, 2 TD
Coastal Carolina	Rushing	Jared Brown	3 carries, 84 yards, 1 TD
Coastal Carolina	Receiving	Sam Pickney	4 receptions, 80 yards, 1 TD

=== Southern Miss ===
	1	2	3	4	Total
Golden Eagles	0	17	3	3	23
Chanticleers	17	0	3	6	26

=== At Virginia (Canceled) ===
	1	2	3	4	Total
Chanticleers					0
Cavaliers					0

=== At James Madison ===
	1	2	3	4	Total
Chanticleers	7	0	0	0	7
Dukes	3	17	20	7	47

=== At Troy (SBC Championship) ===
2022 Hercules Tires Sun Belt Football Championship
Coastal Carolina Chanticleers (9–2, 6–2) vs. Troy Trojans (10–2, 7–2)

Quarter	1	2	3	4	Total
Coastal Carolina	0	7	6	13	26
Troy	17	14	14	0	45

at Veterans Memorial Stadium • Troy, Alabama

- Date: Saturday, December 3, 2022
- Game time: 2:40 p.m CDT
- Game weather: 78 °F (26 °C) • Overcast • Wind 4 mph (6.4 km/h) WSW
- Game attendance: 21,554
- Referee: Wayne Winkler
- TV announcers (ESPN): Dave Flemming, Rod Gilmore and Tiffany Blackmon

Game information

First Quarter

- (11:07) TROY – Brooks Bruce 35 yard field goal (Drive: 9 plays, 57 yards, 3:53; Troy 3–0)
- (9:28) TROY – Deshon Stoudemire 65 yard pass from Gunnar Watson, Brooks Bruce kick (Drive: 1 play, 65 yards, 0:12; Troy 10–0)
- (4:09) TROY – DK Billingsley 8 yard rush, Brooks Bruce kick (Drive: 4 plays, 62 yards, 1:43; Troy 17–0)

Second Quarter

- (12:36) TROY – DK Billingsley 33 yard rush, Brooks Bruce kick (Drive: 2 plays, 48 yards, 0:45; Troy 24–0)
- (9:47) TROY – RaJae' Johnson 67 yard pass from Gunnar Watson, Brooks Bruce kick (Drive: 5 plays, 74 yards, 1:46; Troy 31–0)
- (0:29) CCU – Grayson McCall 8 yard rush, Kade Hensley kick (Drive: 9 plays, 70 yards, 3:35; Troy 31–7)

Third Quarter

- (12:08) CCU – Jared Brown 30 yard pass from Grayson McCall, two-point pass conversion failed (Drive: 6 plays, 75 yards, 2:52; Troy 31–13)
- (8:42) TROY – RaJae' Johnson 36 yard pass from Gunnar Watson, Brooks Bruce kick (Drive: 6 plays, 72 yards, 3:26; Troy 38–13)
- (4:49) TROY – DK Billingsley 3 yard rush, Brooks Bruce kick (Drive: 8 plays, 7 yards, 3:40; Troy 45–13)

Fourth Quarter

- (14:55) CCU – Sam Pinckney 11 yard pass from Grayson McCall, two-point pass conversion failed (Drive: 10 plays, 75 yards, 4:54; Troy 45–19)
- (6:09) CCU – Tyson Mobley 21 yard pass from Grayson McCall, Kade Hensley kick (Drive: 10 plays, 85 yards, 4:03; Troy 45–26)

Statistics	Coastal Carolina	Troy
First downs	27	16
plays–yards	72–432	53–411
Rushes/yards	31–113	36–93
Passing yards	319	318
Passing: Comp–Att–Int	29–41–1	12–17–0
Time of possession	32:22	27:38

Team	Category	Player	Statistics
Coastal Carolina	Passing	Grayson McCall	29/41, 319 yards, 3 TDs, 1 INT
Coastal Carolina	Rushing	Reese White	8 carries, 44 yards
Coastal Carolina	Receiving	Tyson Mobley	7 receptions, 109 yards, 1 TD
Troy	Passing	Gunnar Watson	12/17, 318 yards, 3 TDs
Troy	Rushing	DK Billingsley	9 carries, 57 yards, 3 TDs
Troy	Receiving	RaJae' Johnson	4 receptions, 134 yards, 2 TDs

=== East Carolina (Birmingham Bowl) ===
Birmingham Bowl - Coastal Carolina Chanticleers (9-3) vs East Carolina Pirates (7-5)

Quarter	1	2	3	4	Total
Pirates	10	14	14	15	53
Chanticleers	0	14	7	8	29

at Protective Stadium, Birmingham, AL

- Date: December 27, 2022
- Game time: 6:45 p.m. EST
- Game weather: -
- Game attendance: -
- Referee: Tuta Salaam
- TV: ESPN

Statistics	East Carolina	Coastal Carolina
First downs		
Plays–yards	–	–
Rushes–yards	–	–
Passing yards		
Passing: comp–att–int	––	––
Turnovers		
Time of possession		

Team	Category	Player	Statistics
East Carolina	Passing		
East Carolina	Rushing		
East Carolina	Receiving		
Coastal Carolina	Passing		
Coastal Carolina	Rushing		
Coastal Carolina	Receiving		

Scoring summary

Quarter	Time	Drive			Team	Scoring information	Score	
Quarter	Time	Plays	Yards	TOP	Team	Scoring information	East Carolina	Coastal Carolina
							0	0
"TOP" = time of possession. For other American football terms, see Glossary of American football.							0	0

== Roster ==
2022 Coastal Carolina Chanticleers football team roster
Players
Coaches
Offense

Pos.	#	Name	Class
WR	0	Deon Fountain	Jr
RB	1	Braydon Bennett	So
RB	2	Reese White	Sr
RB	3	Aaron Bedgood (C)	Jr
RB	4	CJ Beasley	So
WR	5	Tyler Roberts	Sr
WR	6	Chris Rhone	Fr
QB	7	Jarrett Guest	Jr
WR	8	Tyson Mobley	Jr
QB	9	Bryce Archie	Fr
QB	10	Grayson McCall (C)	Jr
WR	11	De'Andre Coleman	Fr
QB	12	Bryce Carpenter	GS
RB	13	Max Balthazar	Fr
WR	14	Jared Brown	Fr
WR	15	Sam Pinckney	Sr
RB	16	Ty Lyles	Fr
QB	17	Dontrell Jackson Jr.	Fr
RB	19	Nate Hope II	Jr
TE	20	Logan Mauldin	So
RB	29	Isaiah Jones	Fr
WR	30	Tanner Branson	So
RB	33	Logan Adkins	So
TE	34	Brooks Johnson	Fr
WR	38	Taj Thomas	Jr
TE	40	Patrick McSweeney	Sr
TE	22	Troy Dela Vega	Fr
TE	49	John Grant III	Fr
OL	51	Kip Green	So
OL	53	Kassy Desir
OL	54	Franklin Richardson	Fr
OL	56	Donnell Wilson	Jr
OL	57	Willie Lampkin	Jr
OL	58	Thomas Johnson	Fr
OL	59	Jayden Addison	Jr
OL	60	Andrey Newton	Fr
OL	61	Roger Jacobs	Fr
OL	62	Nick Del Grande	Fr
OL	64	Zovon Lindsay	Jr
OL	65	Dillon Luther	Jr
OL	66	Will McDonald	Jr
OL	67	Donavan Manson	So
OL	68	Caleb Godfree	Fr
OL	69	Willie Moise	So
OL	72	Antwine Loper	GS
OL	73	Anthony Walton	Fr
OL	75	Mason Bowers	So
OL	77	Tom Bambrick	Fr
OL	78	Tyler Wagner	So
WR	80	Dami'on Thompson	Fr
WR	82	Jameson Tucker	Fr
WR	83	Kyre Duplessis	So
TE	84	Jacob Jenkins	Jr
TE	85	Xavier Gravette	Sr
TE	86	TJ Ivy Jr.	Sr
WR	87	Malachi Taylor	Fr
WR	88	Tate Davis	Fr
WR	89	Rian Black	Fr

Defense

Pos.	#	Name	Class
BAN	0	Josaiah Stewart	So
LB	1	Shane Bruce	So
CB	2	D'Jordan Strong	GS
DT	3	Ja'Quon Griffin	Sr
S	4	Tobias Fletcher	So
NT	5	Travis Geiger Jr.	Sr
SPUR	6	Luke Ellenberger	Jr
CB	7	Lance Boykin (C)	Sr
CB	9	Manny Stokes Jr.	Jr
S	10	Tavyn Jackson	GS
DE	11	Amadou Fofana	GS
S	12	Dre Pinckney	Fr
S	13	Joshua Madison	So
SPUR	14	Kiylan Miller	Fr
NT	15	Jerrod Clark (C)	Sr
CB	16	Matthew McDoom	Fr
S	17	Kaleb Hutchinson	Fr
SPUR	18	Jahmar Brown	Jr
CB	19	Elijah Hopkins	Fr
S	20	Chase Atkinson	So
LB	21	JT Killen	Jr
SPUR	22	Josiah Robinson	Fr
CB	23	Jacob Proche	Sr
LB	25	Jamar Darboe	Sr
SPUR	26	Jairan Parker	Sr
LB	27	Aaron Diggs	So
CB	28	Jerrod Cameron Jr.	Fr
CB	29	Zxaequan Reeves	Fr
LB	31	Ze'Marion Harrell	Fr
BANDIT	32	Charles Steele	So
S	33	Austin Randall	Jr
CB	35	Eli Hillman	Fr
BANDIT	36	Joah Cash	Fr
CB	37	De'Angelo Huskey	Sr
S	38	Charles Arnold Jr.	Fr
LB	39	Tré Pinkney	Jr
DE	40	Braylon Ryan	So
DE	41	Corey Warren	Fr
LB	45	Mason Shelton	So
BANDIT	47	Justin Scola	Sr
LB	48	Bailey Carraway	Fr
S	49	Cameron Mitchell	So
DT	52	Allen Henry	Jr
LB	54	Luke Evans	Fr
LB	55	Tray Brown	Fr
BANDIT	81	Adrian Hope	GS
DT	90	Rolan Wooden II	Sr
DE	91	Emmanuel Johnson	Jr
DT	92	Mark Milnac	Jr
NT	93	James Johnson Jr.	So
NT	96	Kyrie Samuel	Fr
DE	97	David Portu	Fr
DE	98	Travis Batts	Fr
DT	99	Kennedy Roberts	Sr

Special teams

Pos.	#	Name	Class
K, P	25	Kade Hensley	Fr
P	28	Evan Crenshaw	Fr
K	31	Liam Gray	Fr
LS	35	Nate Merchant	Fr
P, K	43	Hunter Patrick	So
LS	46	John Kirkpatrick	Fr
LS	81	Payton Bunch	Jr
P, K	95	Mack West	Fr

Head coach

- Jamey Chadwell (East Tennessee State)

Coordinators/assistant coaches

- Chad Staggs (South Carolina)
  Defensive coordinator/s
- Newland Isaac (North Greenville)
  Co-offensive coordinator/rb
- Willy Korn (Clemson)
  Co-offensive coordinator/qb
- Malcolm Dixon (Charleston Southern)
  Wide receivers
- Bill Durkin (Massachusetts)
  Offensive line
- Aaron Fierbaugh (Auburn)
  Inside linebackers
- Bryant Foster (Gardner–Webb)
  Defensive backs
- Cody Ladutko (Averett)
  Tight ends
- Skylor Magee (Southern Miss)
  Defensive line
- Josh Miller (Appalachian State)
  Outside linebackers

Legend

- (C) Team captain
- (S) Suspended
- (I) Ineligible
- Injured
- Redshirt

Roster

== Notes ==
^{^[a]}The game between Coastal Carolina and Virginia was canceled on November 16, 2022, following the 2022 University of Virginia shooting.
