= 2022 Georgia State Panthers football team =

American college football season

2022 Georgia State Panthers football
- Conference: Sun Belt Conference
- East Division
- Record: 4–8 (3–5 Sun Belt)
- Head coach: Shawn Elliott (6th season)
- Offensive coordinator: Trent McKnight (1st season)
- Offensive scheme: Spread
- Defensive coordinator: Nate Fuqua (6th season)
- Base defense: 4–2–5
- Home stadium: Center Parc Stadium

2022 Sun Belt Conference football standings
	Conf.			Overall
Team	W		L	W		L
East Division
James Madison* x	6	–	2	8	–	3
Coastal Carolina xy	6	–	2	9	–	4
Marshall	5	–	3	9	–	4
Georgia Southern	3	–	5	6	–	7
Appalachian State	3	–	5	6	–	6
Georgia State	3	–	5	4	–	8
Old Dominion	2	–	6	3	–	9
West Division
No. 19 Troy xy$	7	–	1	12	–	2
South Alabama x	7	–	1	10	–	3
Southern Miss	4	–	4	7	–	6
Louisiana	4	–	4	6	–	7
Louisiana–Monroe	3	–	5	4	–	8
Texas State	2	–	6	4	–	8
Arkansas State	1	–	7	3	–	9
Championship: Troy 45, Coastal Carolina 26
$ – Conference champion; x – Division champion/co-champions; y – Championship game participant; * – Ineligible for postseason play due to FCS-to-FBS transition rules; Rankings from AP Poll

The 2022 Georgia State Panthers football team represented Georgia State University as a member of the Sun Belt Conference during the 2022 NCAA Division I FBS football season. The Panthers were led by sixth-year head coach Shawn Elliott and played their home games at Center Parc Stadium in Atlanta.

== Preseason ==
=== Media poll ===
The Sun Belt media days were held on July 25 and July 26. The Panthers were predicted to finish in third place in the Sun Belt's East Division. Georgia State also received 1-of-14 first place votes.

=== Sun Belt Preseason All-Conference teams ===
Offense

1st team

- Malik Sumter – Offensive Lineman, RS-SR

2nd team

- Tucker Gregg – Running Back, SR
- Travis Glover – Offensive Lineman, RS-SR
- Pat Bartlett – Offensive Lineman, RS-SR
- Aubry Payne – Offensive Lineman, RS-SR

Defense

1st team

- Blake Carroll – Linebacker, SR
- Antavious Lane – Defensive Back, RS-JR

2nd team

- Thomas Gore – Defensive Lineman, RS-JR

== Schedule ==
Date	Time	Opponent	Site	TV	Result	Attendance
September 3	7:30 p.m.	at South Carolina*	Williams–Brice Stadium; Columbia, SC	ESPN+/SECN+	L 14–35	78,297
September 10	12:00 p.m.	North Carolina*	Center Parc Stadium; Atlanta, GA	ESPNU	L 28–35	17,687
September 17	7:00 p.m.	Charlotte*	Center Parc Stadium; Atlanta, GA	ESPN+	L 41–42	16,433
September 22	7:30 p.m.	Coastal Carolina	Center Parc Stadium; Atlanta, GA	ESPN2	L 24–41	13,467
October 1	12:00 p.m.	at Army*	Michie Stadium; West Point, NY	CBSSN	W 31–14	25,752
October 8	2:00 p.m.	Georgia Southern	Center Parc Stadium; Atlanta, GA (rivalry)	ESPN3	W 41–33	18,756
October 19	7:30 p.m.	at Appalachian State	Kidd Brewer Stadium; Boone, NC	ESPN2	L 17–42	31,757
October 29	3:00 p.m.	Old Dominion^{†}	Center Parc Stadium; Atlanta, GA	ESPN+	W 31–17	16,203
November 5	3:00 p.m.	at Southern Miss	M. M. Roberts Stadium; Hattiesburg, MS	ESPN+	W 42–14	22,128
November 12	1:00 p.m.	Louisiana–Monroe	Center Parc Stadium; Atlanta, GA	ESPN+	L 28–31	12,241
November 19	2:00 p.m.	at James Madison	Bridgeforth Stadium; Harrisonburg, VA	ESPN+	L 40–42	20,055
November 26	12:00 p.m.	at Marshall	Joan C. Edwards Stadium; Huntington, WV	ESPN+	L 23–28	17,427
*Non-conference game; ^{†}Homecoming; All times are in Eastern time

== Game summaries ==
=== At South Carolina ===
	1	2	3	4	Total
Panthers	0	7	7	0	14
Gamecocks	0	12	16	7	35

=== North Carolina ===
North Carolina became the first Power Five team ever to visit Georgia State.

North Carolina at Georgia State

Team	1	2	3	4	Total
• Tar Heels	7	14	7	7	35
Panthers	3	7	18	0	28

- Date: September 10, 2022
- Location: Center Parc Stadium
  Atlanta, GA
- Game start: 12:02 p.m. EDT
- Elapsed time: 3 hours, 28 minutes
- Game attendance: 17,687
- Game weather: Rain
- Referee: Riley Johnson
- TV announcers (ESPNU): Clay Matvick (play-by-play), Rocky Boiman (analyst), Dawn Davenport (sideline)

Scoring summary
1	11:36	UNC	Kamari Morales 55 yd. pass from Drake Maye (Noah Burnette kick) (7 plays, 75 yards, 3:24)	UNC 7–0
1	4:58	GSU	Michael Hayes 45 yd. field goal (10 plays, 39 yards, 2:52)	UNC 7–3
2	13:44	UNC	DJ Jones 7 yd. rush (Noah Burnette kick) (9 plays, 55 yards, 2:51)	UNC 14–3
2	8:58	UNC	Kobe Paysour 28 yd. pass from Drake Maye (Noah Burnette kick) (8 plays, 78 yards, 3:11)	UNC 21–3
2	5:32	GSU	Kris Byrd 6 yd. pass from Darren Grainger (Michael Hayes kick) (11 plays, 75 yards, 3:26)	UNC 21–10
3	13:27	GSU	Robert Lewis 49 yd. pass from Darren Grainger (Michael Hayes kick) (5 plays, 75 yards, 1:33)	UNC 21–17
3	10:19	GSU	Michael Hayes 45 yd. field goal (7 plays, 29 yards, 3:02)	UNC 21–20
3	2:04	GSU	Robert Lewis 29 yd. pass from Darren Grainger (Jamari Thrash pass from Darren Grainger) (10 plays, 98 yards, 3:33)	GSU 28–21
3	0:33	UNC	Omarion Hampton 58 yd. rush (Noah Burnette kick) (4 plays, 75 yards, 1:31)	Tie 28–28
4	10:42	UNC	Omarion Hampton 2 yd. rush (Noah Burnette kick) (5 plays, 92 yards, 2:24)	UNC 35–28

Statistics	UNC	GSU
First downs	23	23
Plays–yards	68–467	78–421
Rushes–yards	44–183	54–235
Passing yards	284	186
Passing: comp–att–int	19–24–1	16–24–0
Time of possession	28:22	31:38

Team	Category	Player	Statistics
North Carolina	Passing	Drake Maye	19/24, 284 yards, 2 TD, INT
North Carolina	Rushing	Omarion Hampton	16 carries, 110 yards, 2 TD
North Carolina	Receiving	Kobe Paysour	5 receptions, 73 yards, TD
Georgia State	Passing	Darren Grainger	16/24, 186 yards, 3 TD
Georgia State	Rushing	Tucker Gregg	18 carries, 79 yards
Georgia State	Receiving	Robert Lewis	7 receptions, 115 yards, 2 TD

=== Charlotte ===
Charlotte vs Georgia State

Team	1	2	3	4	Total
• 49ers	7	14	7	14	42
Panthers	14	6	7	14	41

- Date: September 17
- Location: Center Parc Stadium
  Atlanta, GA
- Game start: 7:02 pm EDT
- Elapsed time: 3:54
- Game attendance: 16,433
- Game weather: 75 °F (24 °C) • Weather: Sunny• Wind: 0 MPH
- Referee: Rodney Burnette
- TV announcers (ESPN+): Matt Stewart, Sam Crenshaw

Scoring summary
1	11:30	GAST	Kris BYRD 9 Yd pass from Darren GRAINGER (Michael HAYES Kick)	GAST 7–0
1	7:56	CHAR	Grant DUBOSE 7 Yd pass from Chris REYNOLDS (Antonio ZITA Kick)	TIED 7–7
1	6:21	GAST	Robert LEWIS 34 Yd pass from Darren GRAINGER (Michael HAYES Kick)	GAST 14–7
2	14:50	CHAR	Markees WATTS 52 Yd Fumble Return (Antonio ZITA Kick)	TIED 14–14
2	9:04	CHAR	Victor TUCKER 2 Yd pass from Chris REYNOLDS (Antonio ZITA Kick)	CHAR 21–14
2	7:29	GAST	Tucker GREGG 2 Yd Run (Michael HAYES PAT failed)	CHAR 21–20
3	12:10	CHAR	Elijah SPENCER 7 Yd pass from Chris REYNOLDS (Antonio ZITA Kick)	CHAR 28–20
3	8:28	GAST	Kris BYRD 6 Yd pass from Darren GRAINGER (Michael HAYES Kick)	CHAR 28–27
4	14:50	CHAR	Henry RUTLEDGE 31 Yd pass from Chris REYNOLDS (Antonio ZITA Kick)	CHAR 35–27
4	11:00	GAST	Tucker GREGG 2 Yd Run (Two-Point Pass Conversion Failed)	CHAR 35–33
4	1:39	GAST	Jamari THRASH 32 Yd pass from Darren GRAINGER (Darren GRAINGER Run for Two-Point	GAST 41–35
4	0:17	CHAR	Grant DUBOSE 2 Yd pass from Chris REYNOLDS (Antonio ZITA Kick)	CHAR 42–41

Game notes:

- 4th game in the series since 2015, (Tied 2–2).

Team	Category	Player	Statistics
Charlotte	Passing	Chris Reynolds	31–43, 401 yards, 5 TD, 1 INT
Charlotte	Rushing	ChaVon McEachern	13 rushes, 76 yards
Charlotte	Receiving	Elijah Spencer	5 receptions, 96 yards, 1 TD
Georgia State	Passing	Darren Grainger	22–34, 343 yards, 4 TD, 1 INT
Georgia State	Rushing	Tucker Gregg	23 rushes, 100 yards, 2 TD
Georgia State	Receiving	Jamari Thrash	10 receptions, 213 yards, 1 TD

Statistics	CHAR	GAST
First downs	26	34
Total yards	501	602
Rushing yards	100	259
Passing yards	401	343
Turnovers	1	2
Time of possession	29:15	30:45

=== Coastal Carolina ===
	1	2	3	4	Total
Chanticleers	21	6	7	7	41
Panthers	7	10	0	7	24

=== At Army ===
Georgia State Panthers at Army Black Knights

Quarter	1	2	3	4	Total
Panthers	3	14	0	14	31
Black Knights	0	0	7	7	14

at Michie Stadium, West Point, NY

- Date: October 1, 2022
- Game time: 12:00 p.m. EDT
- Game weather: Temperature: 57 °F (14 °C) • Wind: E 8 mph • Weather: Cloudy
- Game attendance: 25,752
- Referee: Mike Roche
- TV announcers (CBSSN): Jason Knapp (play-by-play), Ross Tucker (analyst) & Tina Cervasio (sideline)
- ESPN – Georgia State breaks away late, beats Army 31–14 /// Box Score, Georgia State at Army /// Army Pregame Notes /// Georgia State Pregame Notes /// Postgame Notes

Game information

First quarter

- (11:12) GSU FG – Michael Hayes 46-yard field goal
  Drive: 13 plays, 47 yards, 3:48; Georgia State 3–0

Second quarter

- (11:14) GSU TD – Darren Grainger 13-yard rush, Michael Hayes kick
  Drive: 4 plays, 38 yards, 1:19; Georgia State 10–0
- (06:03) GSU TD – Jamyest Williams 33-yard rush, Michael Hayes kick
  Drive: 6 plays, 64 yards, 1:57; Georgia State 17–0

Third quarter

- (10:32) ARMY TD – Tyhier Tyler 1-yard rush, Quinn Maretzki kick
  Drive: 8 plays, 75 yards, 4:28; Georgia State 17–7

Fourth quarter

- (14:57) ARMY TD – Tyhier Tyler 5-yard rush, Quinn Maretzki kick
  Drive: 13 plays, 80 yards, 7:28; Georgia State 17–14
- (02:59) GSU TD – Ja'Cyais Credle 57-yard pass from Darren Grainger, Michael Hayes kick
  Drive: 3 plays, 62 yards, 0:15; Georgia State 24–14
- (01:57) GSU TD – Tucker Gregg 56-yard rush, Michael Hayes kick
  Drive: 2 plays, 60 yards, 0:55; Georgia State 31–14

Passing

- GSU – Darren Grainger: 8/12, 157 yards, 1 TD
- ARMY – Cade Ballard: 1/7, 11 yards, 1 INT

Rushing

- GSU – Tucker Gregg: 16 carries, 124 yards, 1 TD
- ARMY – Tyhier Tyler: 19 carries, 110 yards, 2 TD

Receiving

- GSU – Ja'Cyais Credle: 2 receptions, 75 yards, 1 TD
- ARMY – Tyrell Robinson: 1 reception, 11 yards

Defense

- GSU – Jordan Veneziale: 13 total tackles (7 solo, 6 assisted), 2 fumble recoveries, 2 pass break-ups
- ARMY – Leo Lowin: 12 total tackles (9 solo, 3 assisted), 2 tackles for loss, 1 sack, 1 fumble recovery

Statistics	GSU	ARMY
First downs	20	24
3rd down efficiency	5–10	9–15
4th down efficiency	1–2	0–4
Plays–yards	58–456	77–365
Rushes–yards	46–299	69–354
Passing yards	157	11
Passing: Comp–Att–Int	8–12–0	1–8–1
Penalties–yards	4–34	0–0
Turnovers	1	3
Time of possession	21:05	38:55

=== Georgia Southern ===
	1	2	3	4	Total
Eagles	7	10	13	3	33
Panthers	13	14	7	7	41

=== At Appalachian State ===
Georgia State Panthers (2–4) at Appalachian State Mountaineers (3–3) – Game summary

Quarter	1	2	3	4	Total
Panthers	14	0	0	3	17
Mountaineers	0	7	21	14	42

at Kidd Brewer Stadium, Boone, North Carolina

- Date: October 19
- Game time: 7:30 p.m. EDT
- Game weather: Clear
- Game attendance: 31,757
- Referee: Ted Pitts
- TV announcers (ESPN2): Drew Carter, Aaron Murray, Marilyn Payne

Statistics

Statistics	GAST	APP
First downs	20	26
Total yards	301	466
Rushing yards	228	404
Passing yards	73	62
Turnovers	4	1
Time of possession	23:26	36:34

Team	Category	Player	Statistics
Georgia State	Passing	Darren Grainger	9/23, 73 yards, 1 INT
Georgia State	Rushing	Darren Grainger	19 carries, 100 yards, 1 TD
Georgia State	Receiving	Ahmon Green	2 receptions, 24 yards
Appalachian State	Passing	Chase Brice	7/17, 62 yards
Appalachian State	Rushing	Camerun Peoples	23 carries, 168 yards, 2 TD
Appalachian State	Receiving	Henry Pearson	1 reception, 31 yards

=== Old Dominion ===
	1	2	3	4	Total
Monarchs	7	7	0	3	17
Panthers	7	7	14	3	31

Statistics

Statistics	ODU	GSU
First downs	11	24
Total yards	283	413
Rushing yards	26	218
Passing yards	257	195
Turnovers	2	1
Time of possession	22:50	37:10

Team	Category	Player	Statistics
Old Dominion	Passing	Hayden Wolff	19/34, 257 yards, 2 TD, INT
Old Dominion	Rushing	Blake Watson	14 rushes, 53 yards
Old Dominion	Receiving	Javon Harvey	3 receptions, 124 yards, TD
Georgia State	Passing	Darren Grainger	14/20, 195 yards, TD
Georgia State	Rushing	Darren Grainger	19 rushes, 104 yards, TD
Georgia State	Receiving	Jamari Thrash	3 receptions, 87 yards, TD

=== At Southern Miss ===
	1	2	3	4	Total
Panthers	14	14	7	7	42
Golden Eagles	0	0	14	0	14

=== Louisiana–Monroe ===
	1	2	3	4	Total
Warhawks	3	17	0	11	31
Panthers	14	7	7	0	28

=== At James Madison ===
	1	2	3	4	Total
Panthers	10	24	0	6	40
Dukes	7	7	21	7	42

=== At Marshall ===
Game Twelve – Georgia State Panthers (4–7) at Marshall Thundering Herd (7–4)

Quarter	1	2	3	4	Total
Panthers	7	3	7	6	23
Thundering Herd	0	14	0	14	28

at Joan C. Edwards Stadium • Huntington, West Virginia

- Date: Saturday, November 26, 2022
- Game time: 12:00 p.m. EST
- Game weather: Sunny
- Game attendance: 17,427
- Referee: Scott Broadway
- TV announcers (ESPN+): Chad Bush (play-by-play), Doug Chapman (analyst)

Game information

First quarter

- (11:57) GSU – Tucker Gregg 3 yard run, Michael Hayes kick (Drive: 6 plays, 75 yards, 3:03; Georgia State 7–0)

Second quarter

- (7:47) GSU – Michael Hayes 39 yard field goal (Drive: 13 plays, 73 yards, 4:53; Georgia State 10–0)
- (5:25) MRSH – Khalan Laborn 83 yard run, Rece Verhoff kick (Drive: 1 play, 83 yards, 0:13; Georgia State 10–7)
- (1:25) MRSH – Rasheen Ali 5 yard pass from Cam Fancher, Rece Verhoff kick (Drive: 7 plays, 52 yards, 3:00; Marshall 14–10)

Third quarter

- (8:52) GSU – Jamari Thrash 12 yard pass from Darren Grainger, Michael Hayes kick (Drive: 13 plays, 67 yards, 4:48; Georgia State 17–14)

Fourth quarter

- (10:09) MRSH – Charles Montgomery 32 yard pass from Cam Fancher, Rece Verhoff kick (Drive: 5 plays, 76 yards, 1:02; Marshall 21–17)
- (5:31) MRSH – Khalan Laborn 1 yard run, Rece Verhoff kick (Drive: 5 plays, 39 yards, 2:42; Marshall 28–17)
- (3:25) GSU – Marcus Carroll 2 yard run, Darren Grainger pass failed (Drive: 5 plays, 75 yards, 1:46; Marshall 28–23)

Statistics	GSU	MRSH
First downs	19	25
Plays–yards	69–365	69–486
Rushes–yards	43–74	41–278
Passing yards	291	208
Passing: comp–att–int	19–26–0	18–28–0
Time of possession	29:47	30:13

Team	Category	Player	Statistics
Georgia State	Passing	Darren Grainger	19/26, 291 yards, 1 TD
Georgia State	Rushing	Marcus Carroll	11 carries, 25 yards, 1 TD
Georgia State	Receiving	Jamari Thrash	9 receptions, 155 yards, 1 TD
Marshall	Passing	Cam Fancher	18/28, 208 yards, 2 TD
Marshall	Rushing	Rasheen Ali	16 carries, 102 yards
Marshall	Receiving	Corey Gammage	4 receptions, 65 yards
