= 2022 Texas State Bobcats football team =

American college football season

2022 Texas State Bobcats football
- Conference: Sun Belt Conference
- West Division
- Record: 4–8 (2–6 Sun Belt)
- Head coach: Jake Spavital (4th season)
- Offensive scheme: Air raid
- Defensive coordinator: Zac Spavital (4th season)
- Base defense: 3–4
- Home stadium: Bobcat Stadium

2022 Sun Belt Conference football standings
	Conf.			Overall
Team	W		L	W		L
East Division
James Madison* x	6	–	2	8	–	3
Coastal Carolina xy	6	–	2	9	–	4
Marshall	5	–	3	9	–	4
Georgia Southern	3	–	5	6	–	7
Appalachian State	3	–	5	6	–	6
Georgia State	3	–	5	4	–	8
Old Dominion	2	–	6	3	–	9
West Division
No. 19 Troy xy$	7	–	1	12	–	2
South Alabama x	7	–	1	10	–	3
Southern Miss	4	–	4	7	–	6
Louisiana	4	–	4	6	–	7
Louisiana–Monroe	3	–	5	4	–	8
Texas State	2	–	6	4	–	8
Arkansas State	1	–	7	3	–	9
Championship: Troy 45, Coastal Carolina 26
$ – Conference champion; x – Division champion/co-champions; y – Championship game participant; * – Ineligible for postseason play due to FCS-to-FBS transition rules; Rankings from AP Poll

The 2022 Texas State Bobcats football team represented Texas State University as a member of the Sun Belt Conference during the 2022 NCAA Division I FBS football season. They were led by head coach Jake Spavital, who would be coaching his fourth season and final with the team. The Bobcats played their home games at Bobcat Stadium in San Marcos, Texas.

Despite starting the season with a promising record of 3–3, the Bobcats would finish the season going 1–5, with three of these losses being by a touchdown or less, to finish with an overall record of 4–8. Spavital was fired on November 27, going 13–35 through four seasons as the program's head coach.

== Preseason ==
=== Sun Belt coaches poll ===
The Sun Belt coaches poll was released on July 25, 2022. The Bobcats were picked to finish fourth in the West Division.

=== Sun Belt Preseason All-Conference teams ===
Offense

1st Team

- Dalton Cooper – Offensive Lineman, SO

2nd Team

- Kyle Hergel – Offensive Lineman, JR

Special Teams

1st Team

- Seth Keller – Kicker, JR

== Personnel ==
2022 Texas State Bobcats football team roster
Players
Coaches
Offense

Pos.	#	Name	Class
WR	0	Rontavius Groves	Sr
WR	1	Javen Banks	Sr
WR	2	Ashtyn Hawkins	So
QB	3	Layne Hatcher	Jr
QB	4	Ty Evans	So
WR	5	Demarcus Gregory	Jr
WR	6	Donnovan Moorer	So
WR	8	Waydale Jones	Jr
WR	9	Drue Jackson	Jr
QB	10	Tanner Prewit	So
RB	11	Calvin Hill	So
QB	12	CJ Rogers	Fr
WR	13	Charles Brown	Fr
QB	14	Derek Mata	Fr
RB	15	Damarius Good	So
WR	17	Julian Ortega-Jones	Jr
WR	18	Marcell Barbee	Sr
WR	19	Dennis Robinson	Sr
RB	20	Josh Berry	So
RB	22	Lincoln Pare	So
TE	24	DJ Johnson	Fr
WR	27	Kannon Webb	Fr
RB	28	Jahmyl Jeter	Jr
WR	29	Brandon Teggs	Fr
RB	30	Trent Lacy	Fr
WR	31	Adam Tillmon	Sr
TE	32	James Palmer	Jr
RB	34	Emmanuel Abdallah	Fr
WR	35	Mason Lemme	Fr
TE	41	Tyler Huff	Sr
OL	52	Austin Markiewicz	Fr
OL	55	Trenton Scott	Fr
OL	56	Nic Fulwider	Jr
OL	58	Larson Workman	Fr
OL	60	Kyle Hergel	Jr
OL	61	Evan Lovell	Jr
OL	64	Freddy Murphy	Fr
OL	66	Russell Baker	Sr
OL	68	David Hensley	Fr
OL	71	Jackson Schultze	Fr
OL	72	Alex Costilla	Jr
OL	73	Dalton Cooper	So
OL	74	Richard West	Sr
OL	75	Silas Robinson	Jr
OL	76	Kylar Cooks	Jr
OL	78	Ian Hover	So
OL	79	Jaydan Smith	Jr
WR	80	Chandler Speights	Sr
WR	82	Isaac Norris	Fr
TE	83	Micah Hilts	Jr
WR	84	Ahmirr Robinson	Fr
WR	85	Brooks McCoy	Fr
TE	86	Titus Lyons	Fr
TE	87	Jackson Lanam	Jr
WR	88	Jaden Mitchell	So
TE	89	Austin Groeschel	Fr

Defense

Pos.	#	Name	Class
S	0	Jarron Morris	Jr
S	2	Kevin Anderson	Jr
CB	3	Kordell Rodgers	Sr
CB	4	Alonzo Edwards Jr.	So
S	5	DeJordan Mask	Jr
CB	7	Chris Mills	So
OLB	8	Jordan Revels	Jr
OLB	9	DeMarrquese Hayes	So
OLB	10	Issiah Nixon	So
S	12	Tory Spears	Jr
ILB	14	Kenny Haynes	So
CB	15	Rodrick Hockley	Jr
CB	16	Javen Ware	So
S	18	Christian Tschauner	So
ILB	19	CJ Williams	Jr
CB	21	Pierre Kemeni	So
S	23	Peyton Tuggle	Sr
OLB	24	Devin Martinez	So
S	25	Ronnie Hamrick II	Fr
ILB	27	London Harris	Sr
CB	29	Drake Johnson	So
ILB	30	Josh Emmanuel	So
CB	31	Bernock Iya	Fr
ILB	32	John Emmanuel	Fr
OLB	33	Ben Bell	So
ILB	34	Graham Faloona	Fr
CB	35	Jonathan James	Fr
ILB	37	Brian Holloway	Jr
DL	40	Kajuan Robinson	So
CB	41	Kaden Watts	Fr
OLB	42	Nace Washington	Fr
DL	44	Jordan Mitchell	Fr
DL	47	Colten Matus	So
S	48	Jalen Stewart	Fr
OLB	49	Will Cornelson	Fr
DL	51	Christian Owens	Jr
DL	53	Ethan Hamby	Fr
DL	54	Levi Bell	Jr
ILB	55	Sione Tupou	Sr
LB	56	Owen McClintock
OLB	57	TJ Chirebvu	Fr
ILB	58	Conner Motsinger	Fr
ILB	59	Micah Strahan	So
DL	87	Gage Patrick	Fr
OLB	90	Jake Lynch	Jr
DL	91	Nelson Mbanasor	Sr
DL	92	Samuel Obiang	Sr
DL	93	DeOnte Washington	So
DL	94	Kamren Washington	So
DL	95	Nico Ezidore	Sr
DL	96	Davon Sears	Jr
DL	97	Dominique Ratcliff	Fr
DL	98	Gjemar Daniels	Sr
DL	99	Myron Warren	So

Special teams

Pos.	#	Name	Class
K	6	Seth Keller	Jr
K	36	Mason Shipley	Fr
P	38	David Nunez	Fr
K	43	Michael James	Fr
LS	45	Kaydon Olivia	Fr
LS	46	Durham Harris	So
LS	50	Valen Penn	Fr
P	99	Seamus O'Kelly	Jr

Head coach

- Jake Spavital (Missouri State)

Coordinators/assistant coaches

- Zac Spavital (Murray State)
  Defensive coordinator
- RJ Fleming (Arkansas State)
  Running backs
- Bryson Abraham (Louisiana Tech)
  Wide receivers
- Chris Buckner (New Mexico State)
  Wide receivers
- Boone Feldt (Texas–Permian Basin)
  Tight ends
- Brian Hamilton (SUNY Cortland)
  Offensive line
- Jacori Greer (New Mexico)
  Defensive line
- Brian Gamble (Texas A&M)
  Inside linebackers
- Tevin Mims (Texas Tech)
  Outside linebackers
- Clay Jennings (North Texas)
  Defensive backs/passing game coordinator
- Patrick Doherty (Franklin College)
  Offensive analyst
- Zach McCarthy (Texas State)
  Defensive analyst
- Tyler Zielenske (Mercer)
  Special teams analyst
- Reece Barlow (Texas State)
  Special teams graduate assistant
- Andrew Cobus (Texas Lutheran)
  Offensive graduate assistant
- Jada Gipson (Texas State)
  Defensive graduate assistant
- Jarred Gray (Mississippi)
  Defensive graduate assistant
- Haleigh Blocker
  Director of football operations
- Damon Harrington
  Head strength and conditioning coach
- Jason Russell
  Assistant strength and conditioning coach
- Romorious Westbrook
  Strength and conditioning coach
- Jeremy Cobb
  Head football athletic trainer
- Brendan Ahern
  Assistant athletic trainer
- Andrew Johnson
  Director of equipment operations
- Evan King
  Video coordinator
- Luis Mendoza
  Athletic equipment manager
- Alex Powell
  Director of creative media
- Connor Anderson
  Director of player personnel
- James Sherman
  Director of player development
- Dru Sawyer
  On-campus recruiting coordinator

Legend

- (C) Team captain
- (S) Suspended
- (I) Ineligible
- Injured
- Redshirt

Roster

== Schedule ==
Texas State and the Sun Belt Conference announced the 2022 football schedule on March 1, 2022.

Date	Time	Opponent	Site	TV	Result	Attendance
September 3	4:30 p.m.	at Nevada*	Mackay Stadium; Reno, NV	NSN	L 14–38	13,260
September 10	6:00 p.m.	FIU*	Bobcat Stadium; San Marcos, TX	ESPN+	W 41–12	18,757
September 17	11:00 a.m.	at No. 17 Baylor*	McLane Stadium; Waco, TX	FS1	L 7–42	45,597
September 24	6:00 p.m.	Houston Christian*	Bobcat Stadium; San Marcos, TX	ESPN3	W 34–0	16,237
October 1	12:30 p.m.	at James Madison	Bridgeforth Stadium; Harrisonburg, VA	ESPN+	L 13–40	25,188
October 8	6:00 p.m.	Appalachian State	Bobcat Stadium; San Marcos, TX	ESPN+	W 36–24	25,613
October 15	2:30 p.m.	at Troy	Veterans Memorial Stadium; Troy, AL	ESPN3	L 14–17	23,480
October 22	4:00 p.m.	Southern Miss^{†}	Bobcat Stadium; San Marcos, TX	ESPN+	L 14–20	16,318
November 5	4:00 p.m.	at Louisiana–Monroe	Malone Stadium; Monroe, LA	ESPN3	L 30–31	11,376
November 12	4:00 p.m.	at South Alabama	Hancock Whitney Stadium; Mobile, AL	ESPN+	L 21–38	14,518
November 19	4:00 p.m.	Arkansas State	Bobcat Stadium; San Marcos, TX	ESPN3	W 16–13	13,287
November 26	4:00 p.m.	Louisiana	Bobcat Stadium; San Marcos, TX	ESPN+	L 13–41	15,035
*Non-conference game; ^{†}Homecoming; Rankings from AP Poll (and CFP Rankings, after November 1) - Released prior to game; All times are in Central time

== Game summaries ==
=== At Nevada ===
	1	2	3	4	Total
Bobcats	0	7	0	7	14
Wolf Pack	14	0	24	0	38

Statistics	TXST	NEV
First downs	15	13
Total yards	282	278
Rushing yards	-11	134
Passing yards	293	144
Turnovers	4	0
Time of possession	30:33	29:27

Team	Category	Player	Statistics
Texas State	Passing	Layne Hatcher	34/52, 293 yards, 2 TD, 2 INT
Texas State	Rushing	Jahmyl Jeter	10 rushes, 22 yards
Texas State	Receiving	Ashtyn Hawkins	11 receptions, 101 yards, TD
Nevada	Passing	Shane Illingworth	11/13, 101 yards
Nevada	Rushing	Jake Barlage	1 rush, 37 yards
Nevada	Receiving	Jamaal Bell	6 receptions, 60 yards

=== FIU ===
	1	2	3	4	Total
Panthers	3	3	0	6	12
Bobcats	10	10	0	21	41

Statistics	FIU	TXST
First downs	18	21
Total yards	313	452
Rushing yards	62	226
Passing yards	251	225
Turnovers	2	2
Time of possession	27:58	32:02

Team	Category	Player	Statistics
FIU	Passing	Grayson James	30/47, 196 yards, 2 INT
FIU	Rushing	E. J. Wilson Jr.	6 rushes, 18 yards, TD
FIU	Receiving	Tyrese Chambers	10 receptions, 72 yards
Texas State	Passing	Layne Hatcher	15/30, 226 yards, 3 TD, INT
Texas State	Rushing	Calvin Hill	28 rushes, 195 yards, TD
Texas State	Receiving	Charles Brown	2 receptions, 68 yards, TD

=== At No. 17 Baylor ===
	1	2	3	4	Total
Bobcats	0	7	0	0	7
No. 17 Bears	7	14	7	14	42

Statistics	TXST	BAY
First downs	17	23
Total yards	268	501
Rushing yards	82	293
Passing yards	186	208
Turnovers	1	3
Time of possession	31:32	28:28

Team	Category	Player	Statistics
Texas State	Passing	Layne Hatcher	24/36, 186 yards, TD
Texas State	Rushing	Calvin Hill	12 rushes, 41 yards
Texas State	Receiving	Ashtyn Hawkins	13 receptions, 114 yards, TD
Baylor	Passing	Blake Shapen	15/26, 184 yards, TD, INT
Baylor	Rushing	Richard Reese	19 rushes, 156 yards, 3 TD
Baylor	Receiving	Gavin Holmes	3 receptions, 46 yards, TD

=== Houston Christian ===
	1	2	3	4	Total
Huskies	0	0	0	0	0
Bobcats	7	17	3	7	34

Statistics	HCU	TXST
First downs	8	28
Total yards	142	479
Rushing yards	39	117
Passing yards	103	362
Turnovers	1	1
Time of possession	24:55	35:05

Team	Category	Player	Statistics
Houston Christian	Passing	Justin Fomby	23/36, 103 yards, INT
Houston Christian	Rushing	R. J. Smith	9 rushes, 24 yards
Houston Christian	Receiving	Vernon Harrell	2 receptions, 26 yards
Texas State	Passing	Layne Hatcher	27/41, 362 yards, 4 TD, INT
Texas State	Rushing	Lincoln Pare	19 rushes, 84 yards
Texas State	Receiving	Marcell Barbee	6 receptions, 112 yards, TD

=== At James Madison ===
	1	2	3	4	Total
Bobcats	0	0	7	6	13
Dukes	7	12	7	14	40

Statistics	TXST	JMU
First downs	11	22
Total yards	246	460
Rushing yards	106	203
Passing yards	140	257
Turnovers	4	3
Time of possession	26:05	33:55

Team	Category	Player	Statistics
Texas State	Passing	Layne Hatcher	13/27, 140 yards, TD, 2 INT
Texas State	Rushing	Lincoln Pare	17 rushes, 81 yards
Texas State	Receiving	Marcell Barbee	4 receptions, 56 yards
James Madison	Passing	Todd Centeio	15/25, 257 yards, INT
James Madison	Rushing	Latrele Palmer	27 rushes, 106 yards, 3 TD
James Madison	Receiving	Kris Thornton	4 receptions, 97 yards

=== Appalachian State ===
	1	2	3	4	Total
Mountaineers	0	3	7	14	24
Bobcats	7	17	9	3	36

Statistics	APP	TXST
First downs	20	22
Total yards	436	334
Rushing yards	41	53
Passing yards	395	281
Turnovers	2	1
Time of possession	27:21	32:39

Team	Category	Player	Statistics
Appalachian State	Passing	Chase Brice	40/53, 395 yards, 3 TD, INT
Appalachian State	Rushing	Nate Noel	5 rushes, 19 yards
Appalachian State	Receiving	Dalton Stroman	5 receptions, 104 yards, TD
Texas State	Passing	Layne Hatcher	26/36, 281 yards, 2 TD, INT
Texas State	Rushing	Lincoln Pare	20 rushes, 64 yards, TD
Texas State	Receiving	Ashtyn Hawkins	6 receptions, 105 yards, TD

=== At Troy ===
	1	2	3	4	Total
Bobcats	0	7	7	0	14
Trojans	0	10	0	7	17

Statistics	TXST	TROY
First downs	13	17
Total yards	293	406
Rushing yards	86	107
Passing yards	207	299
Turnovers	0	1
Time of possession	30:26	29:34

Team	Category	Player	Statistics
Texas State	Passing	Layne Hatcher	21/32, 207 yards, TD
Texas State	Rushing	Lincoln Pare	18 rushes, 67 yards, TD
Texas State	Receiving	Lincoln Pare	3 receptions, 71 yards, TD
Troy	Passing	Gunnar Watson	12/22, 240 yards, TD, INT
Troy	Rushing	D. K. Billingsley	16 rushes, 70 yards
Troy	Receiving	Tez Johnson	4 receptions, 94 yards, TD

=== Southern Miss ===
	1	2	3	4	Total
Golden Eagles	3	10	0	7	20
Bobcats	0	7	0	7	14

Statistics	USM	TXST
First downs	17	12
Total yards	318	243
Rushing yards	131	-6
Passing yards	187	249
Turnovers	3	1
Time of possession	34:10	25:50

Team	Category	Player	Statistics
Southern Miss	Passing	Zach Wilcke	18/25, 187 yards, TD, 2 INT
Southern Miss	Rushing	Frank Gore Jr.	20 rushes, 91 yards
Southern Miss	Receiving	Chandler Pittman	1 reception, 53 yards, TD
Texas State	Passing	Layne Hatcher	26/42, 249 yards, 2 TD, INT
Texas State	Rushing	Calvin Hill	3 rushes, 3 yards
Texas State	Receiving	Ashtyn Hawkins	5 receptions, 102 yards, TD

=== At Louisiana–Monroe ===
	1	2	3	4	Total
Bobcats	21	3	3	3	30
Warhawks	0	17	7	7	31

Statistics	TXST	ULM
First downs	19	23
Total yards	367	380
Rushing yards	130	67
Passing yards	237	313
Turnovers	0	4
Time of possession	31:31	28:29

Team	Category	Player	Statistics
Texas State	Passing	Layne Hatcher	29/41, 237 yards, 2 TD
Texas State	Rushing	Lincoln Pare	25 rushes, 100 yards, TD
Texas State	Receiving	Julian Ortega-Jones	8 receptions, 92 yards
Louisiana–Monroe	Passing	Chandler Rogers	28/40, 310 yards, 2 TD, INT
Louisiana–Monroe	Rushing	Malik Jackson	12 rushes, 47 yards, TD
Louisiana–Monroe	Receiving	Tyrone Howell	12 receptions, 176 yards, 2 TD

=== At South Alabama ===
	1	2	3	4	Total
Bobcats	0	0	7	14	21
Jaguars	10	7	7	14	38

Statistics	TXST	USA
First downs	20	19
Total yards	230	380
Rushing yards	87	106
Passing yards	143	274
Turnovers	1	0
Time of possession	26:27	33:33

Team	Category	Player	Statistics
Texas State	Passing	Layne Hatcher	24/42, 143 yards, TD, INT
Texas State	Rushing	Josh Berry	15 carries, 87 yards, TD
Texas State	Receiving	Lincoln Pare	6 receptions, 30 yards
South Alabama	Passing	Carter Bradley	20/34, 274 yards, 4 TD
South Alabama	Rushing	Marco Lee	14 carries, 57 yards
South Alabama	Receiving	Devin Voisin	6 receptions, 118 yards, 2 TD

=== At Arkansas State ===
	1	2	3	4	Total
Red Wolves	0	7	3	3	13
Bobcats	3	0	0	13	16

Statistics	TXST	ARST
First downs	14	19
Total yards	291	340
Rushing yards	54	144
Passing yards	237	196
Turnovers	0	0
Time of possession	25:57	34:03

Team	Category	Player	Statistics
Texas State	Passing	Layne Hatcher	23/36, 196 yards
Texas State	Rushing	Lincoln Pare	19 carries, 75 yards, TD
Texas State	Receiving	Donovan Moorer	6 receptions, 54 yards
Arkansas State	Passing	James Blackman	22/40, 237 yards, TD
Arkansas State	Rushing	Johnnie Lang	13 carries, 36 yards
Arkansas State	Receiving	Daverrick Jenkins	3 receptions, 56 yards

=== Louisiana ===
	1	2	3	4	Total
Ragin' Cajuns	7	13	7	14	41
Bobcats	3	3	7	0	13

Statistics	UL	TXST
First downs	27	15
Total yards	436	356
Rushing yards	165	223
Passing yards	271	133
Turnovers	1	2
Time of possession	30:34	29:26

Team	Category	Player	Statistics
Louisiana	Passing	Chandler Fields	16/26, 187 yards, 2 TDs, 1 INT
Louisiana	Rushing	Dre'lyn Washington	10 carries, 73 yards, 1 TD
Louisiana	Receiving	Lance Legendre	4 receptions, 81 yards, 1 TD
Texas State	Passing	Layne Hatcher	13/27, 133 yards, 1 INT
Texas State	Rushing	Lincoln Pare	4 receptions, 81 yards, 1 TD
Texas State	Receiving	Charles Brown	3 receptions, 60 yards
