= 2022 James Madison Dukes football team =

American college football season

2022 James Madison Dukes football

Sun Belt East Division co-champion
- Conference: Sun Belt
- East Division
- Record: 8–3 (6–2 Sun Belt)
- Head coach: Curt Cignetti (4th season)
- Offensive coordinator: Mike Shanahan (2nd season)
- Offensive scheme: Spread
- Defensive coordinator: Bryant Haines (1st season)
- Base defense: 4–2–5
- Home stadium: Bridgeforth Stadium

2022 Sun Belt Conference football standings
	Conf.			Overall
Team	W		L	W		L
East Division
James Madison* x	6	–	2	8	–	3
Coastal Carolina xy	6	–	2	9	–	4
Marshall	5	–	3	9	–	4
Georgia Southern	3	–	5	6	–	7
Appalachian State	3	–	5	6	–	6
Georgia State	3	–	5	4	–	8
Old Dominion	2	–	6	3	–	9
West Division
No. 19 Troy xy$	7	–	1	12	–	2
South Alabama x	7	–	1	10	–	3
Southern Miss	4	–	4	7	–	6
Louisiana	4	–	4	6	–	7
Louisiana–Monroe	3	–	5	4	–	8
Texas State	2	–	6	4	–	8
Arkansas State	1	–	7	3	–	9
Championship: Troy 45, Coastal Carolina 26
$ – Conference champion; x – Division champion/co-champions; y – Championship game participant; * – Ineligible for postseason play due to FCS-to-FBS transition rules; Rankings from AP Poll

The 2022 James Madison Dukes football team represented James Madison University in the 2022 NCAA Division I FBS football season. They were led by fourth-year head coach Curt Cignetti. The Dukes played their home games at Bridgeforth Stadium in Harrisonburg, Virginia as members of the East division of the Sun Belt Conference. The Dukes finished the season 8–3, 6–2 in Sun Belt play to finish in a tie for first place in the East division.

The season marked the Dukes' first year in the Sun Belt and the first of a two-year transition period from the Football Championship Subdivision. They were not eligible for a bowl game due to the transition period. Ordinarily, the first year of an FCS to FBS transition is spent as an FCS team with a mixed schedule of FCS and FBS opponents, while a schedule more closely resembling that of a typical FBS team is played in the second year. However, the Dukes had 10 FBS teams on their 11-game 2022 schedule, including five home games against FBS teams, which allowed their opponents to count James Madison as an FBS team in determining their own bowl eligibility. The Dukes filed an application with the NCAA requesting a waiver that would count the 2022 season as the second year of the two-year transition period. On April 27, 2023, the NCAA denied the waiver.

On October 9, 2022, the Dukes were ranked No. 25 in the AP poll, a first for the school.

== Preseason ==
=== Media poll ===
The Sun Belt media days were held on July 25 and 26, 2022. The Dukes were picked to finish in sixth place in the Sun Belt's East division.

=== Sun Belt Preseason All-Conference teams ===
Offense

1st team

- Kris Thornton – Wide Receiver, RS-SR

== Roster ==
2022 James Madison Dukes football team roster
Players
Coaches
Offense

Pos.	#	Name	Class
WR	0	Terrance Green Jr.	GS
QB	1	Todd Centeio	GS
RB	3	Solomon Vanhorse	Jr
RB	5	Latrele Palmer	Jr
RB	6	Kaelon Black	Fr
WR	8	Kris Thornton	Sr
WR	9	Reggie Brown	Jr
QB	11	Billy Atkins	Fr
WR	12	Jayden Mines	Fr
WR	13	Anthony Johnson	Fr
QB	14	Alonza Barnett III	Fr
WR	15	Maxwell James	Fr
WR	16	Desmond Green	Fr
QB	16	Chase Hart	Fr
QB	18	Blake Kendall	Fr
WR	19	Devin Ravenel	Sr
RB	21	A. J. Davis	GS
WR	22	Marion Haley	Fr
RB	23	Sammy Malignaggi	So
RB	25	Wayne Knight	Fr
WR	28	Blake Barnes	Fr
RB	31	Percy Agyei-Obese	GS
RB	32	Kalin Jean	Fr
RB	40	Peyton Rutherford	So
RB	41	Anthony Eaton	Fr
TE	43	Cooper Thunell	Fr
TE	44	Zach Horton	So
WR	45	Holt Egan	Fr
WR	49	Payton Hunter	So
OL	52	Tyshawn Wyatt	So
OL	53	Andrew Adair	So
OL	54	Carter Miller	Fr
OL	55	Ronald Altman	So
OL	56	Nick Kidwell	Jr
OL	58	Tanner Morris	So
OL	60	Carter Sweazie	Fr
OL	61	Joe Worman	So
OL	62	Wesley Bostic	Fr
OL	66	Cole Potts	So
OL	70	Brett Davis	Fr
OL	71	Scott Hummel	Fr
OL	72	Josh Toner	Fr
OL	74	Tyler Stephens	So
OL	75	Jaelin Montgomery	Fr
OL	76	Jack Workman	Fr
OL	78	Isaac Owusu-Appiah	So
OL	79	Joseph Simmons	Fr
WR	82	Troy Lewis	Fr
WR	83	Erick Harris	Fr
TE	84	Kelly Mitchell	So
TE	85	Noah Turner	GS
TE	89	Drew Painter	Sr

Defense

Pos.	#	Name	Class
DL	0	Isaac Ukwu	Sr
S	1	Que Reid	Jr
CB	2	Chauncey Logan	Fr
DL	3	Mikail Kamara	Fr
DL	5	Jamare Edwards	Sr
LB	6	Julio Ayamel	So
S	7	Jarius Reimonenq	Jr
S	8	Deon Jones	GS
DL	8	Abi Nwabouku-Okonji	Jr
DL	9	Jamree Kromah	Jr
DL	10	Jalen Green	Jr
CB	11	Antonio Webb	Fr
S	12	Josh Sarratt	Jr
CB	13	John Ransom	So
CB	14	Nehki Meredith	Fr
DL	17	Amar Thomas	Fr
LB	18	Skylar Martin	So
CB	20	Xavier Cokley	So
CB	21	Jordan Swann	Sr
S	22	Jordan White	So
LB	24	Trent Hendrick	Fr
LB	25	Jailin Walker	So
CB	26	Devyn Coles	Jr
S	27	Jacob Thomas	Fr
S	28	Kye Holmes	So
CB	29	Brent Austin	Fr
CB	30	Justin Eaglin	Fr
CB	31	Antoine Booth	Fr
LB	32	Aiden Fisher	Fr
S	33	Sam Kidd	Sr
S	34	Chris Chukwuneke	Jr
S	35	Jahquil Batts	Fr
DL	39	Payne Bauer	Fr
LB	41	Tate Beaver	Sr
DL	42	Carter Banks	Fr
LB	43	Matthew Channell	Fr
LB	44	Taurus Jones	So
DL	45	Antonio Colclough	Jr
LB	46	Seth Noatala	So
DL	48	Greyson Cadd	Fr
S	49	Francis Meehan	Jr
LB	51	Mateo Jackson	Sr
DL	53	Zai Roberts	So
LB	54	Brandon Fique	Fr
DL	55	Jordan Funk	So
DL	57	Ike Thompson	Fr
DL	59	Tyrique Tucker	Fr
DL	90	Tony Thurston	Jr
DL	92	Tyler Negron	Fr
DL	94	Sean Pettis	So
DL	95	Chepas Pettis	Fr
DL	99	James Carpenter	So

Special teams

Pos.	#	Name	Class
K, P	36	Justin Ritter	So
K	37	Wade Robins	Fr
K	40	Camden Wise	Jr
LS	46	Aaron Whear	So
LS	50	Kyle Davis	GS
LS	51	Kaden Schickel	Fr
P	91	Sam Clark	Sr
K	96	Connor Madden	Jr

Head coach

- Curt Cignetti

Coordinators/assistant coaches

- Mike Shanahan (Offensive coordinator / Wide receivers)
- Bryant Haines (Defensive coordinator / Linebackers)
- Grant Cain (Special teams coordinator / Tight ends / Assistant head coach)
- Marcus Hall-Oliver (Safeties)
- Matt Birkett (Cornerbacks)
- John Miller (Running backs)
- Damian Wroblewski (Offensive line / Assistant head coach)
- Tino Sunseri (Quarterbacks / Pass game)
- Pat Kuntz (Defensive line)

Legend

- (C) Team captain
- (S) Suspended
- (I) Ineligible
- Injured
- Redshirt

Roster
Last update: June 24, 2022

== Schedule ==
Date	Time	Opponent	Rank	Site	TV	Result	Attendance
September 3	6:00 p.m.	Middle Tennessee*		Bridgeforth Stadium; Harrisonburg, VA	ESPN+	W 44–7	23,074
September 10	4:00 p.m.	Norfolk State*		Bridgeforth Stadium; Harrisonburg, VA	ESPN3	W 63–7	23,928
September 24	3:30 p.m.	at Appalachian State		Kidd Brewer Stadium; Boone, NC	ESPN+	W 32–28	33,248
October 1	1:30 p.m.	Texas State		Bridgeforth Stadium; Harrisonburg, VA	ESPN+	W 40–13	25,188
October 8	6:00 p.m.	at Arkansas State		Centennial Bank Stadium; Jonesboro, AR	NFLN	W 42–20	20,083
October 15	4:00 p.m.	at Georgia Southern	No. 25	Paulson Stadium; Statesboro, GA	ESPN+	L 38–45	18,738
October 22	3:30 p.m.	Marshall^{†}		Bridgeforth Stadium; Harrisonburg, VA	ESPN+	L 12–26	26,159
November 5	7:30 p.m.	at Louisville*		Cardinal Stadium; Louisville, KY	ESPNU	L 10–34	42,157
November 12	1:00 p.m.	at Old Dominion		S.B. Ballard Stadium; Norfolk, VA (Oyster Bowl, Royal Rivalry)	ESPN+	W 37–3	21,934
November 19	2:00 p.m.	Georgia State		Bridgeforth Stadium; Harrisonburg, VA	ESPN+	W 42–40	20,055
November 26	12:00 p.m.	Coastal Carolina		Bridgeforth Stadium; Harrisonburg, VA	ESPNU	W 47–7	19,393
*Non-conference game; ^{†}Homecoming; Rankings from AP Poll released prior to the game; All times are in Eastern time

== Game summaries ==
=== Middle Tennessee ===
	1	2	3	4	Total
Blue Raiders	0	0	7	0	7
Dukes	0	21	16	7	44

=== Norfolk State ===
	1	2	3	4	Total
Spartans	0	0	7	0	7
Dukes	21	14	21	7	63

=== At Appalachian State ===
James Madison Dukes (2–0) at Appalachian State Mountaineers (2–1) – Game summary

Quarter	1	2	3	4	Total
Dukes	3	7	7	15	32
Mountaineers	0	28	0	0	28

at Kidd Brewer Stadium, Boone, NC

- Date: September 24
- Game time: 3:30 p.m. EDT
- Game weather: Sunny, 67 °F (19 °C)
- Game attendance: 33,248
- Referee: Trennins Livingston
- TV announcers (ESPN+): David Jackson and Avery Hall
- Box score, Recap

Game information
First quarter
- JMU – Camden Wise 27-yard field goal, 8:10. Dukes 3–0. Drive: 13 plays, 65 yards, 6:50.

Second quarter

- APP – Camerun Peoples 2-yard run (Michael Hughes kick), 13:45. Mountaineers 7–3. Drive: 9 plays, 58 yards, 3:54.
- APP – Miller Gibbs 10-yard pass from Chase Brice (Michael Hughes kick), 11:45. Mountaineers 14–3. Drive: 4 plays, 22 yards, 1:53.
- APP – Dalton Stroman 27-yard pass from Chase Brice (Michael Hughes kick), 8:37. Mountaineers 21–3. Drive: 3 plays, 68 yards, 1:07.
- APP – Nate Noel 5-yard run (Michael Hughes kick), 6:10. Mountaineers 28–3. Drive: 3 plays, 16 yards, 0:46.
- JMU – Kaelon Black 23-yard pass from Todd Centeio (Camden Wise kick), 2:16. Mountaineers 28–10. Drive: 8 plays, 75 yards, 3:54.

Third quarter

- JMU – Todd Centeio 2-yard run (Camden Wise kick), 1:19. Mountaineers 28–17. Drive: 6 plays, 41 yards, 2:53.

Fourth quarter

- JMU – Terrance Greene Jr. 36-yard pass from Todd Centeio (Todd Centeio pass to Kris Thornton), 11:28. Mountaineers 28–25. Drive: 5 plays, 92 yards, 1:58.
- JMU – Kaelon Black 4-yard run (Camden Wise kick), 10:36. Dukes 32–28. Drive: 2 plays, 9 yards, 0:35.

Statistics

Statistics	JMU	APP
First downs	19	15
Total yards	376	298
Rushing yards	172	63
Passing yards	204	235
Turnovers	2	2
Time of possession	33:28	26:32

Team	Category	Player	Statistics
James Madison	Passing	Todd Centeio	16/28, 204 yards, 2 TD
James Madison	Rushing	Kaelon Black	18 rushes, 85 yards, TD
James Madison	Receiving	Reggie Brown	4 receptions, 81 yards
Appalachian State	Passing	Chase Brice	17/28, 235 yards, 2 TD, INT
Appalachian State	Rushing	Ahmani Marshall	8 rushes, 40 yards
Appalachian State	Receiving	Dashaun Davis	3 receptions, 57 yards

=== Texas State ===
	1	2	3	4	Total
Bobcats	0	0	7	6	13
Dukes	7	12	7	14	40

Statistics	TXST	JMU
First downs	11	22
Total yards	246	460
Rushing yards	106	203
Passing yards	140	257
Turnovers	4	3
Time of possession	26:05	33:55

Team	Category	Player	Statistics
Texas State	Passing	Layne Hatcher	13/27, 140 yards, TD, 2 INT
Texas State	Rushing	Lincoln Pare	17 rushes, 81 yards
Texas State	Receiving	Marcell Barbee	4 receptions, 56 yards
James Madison	Passing	Todd Centeio	15/25, 257 yards, INT
James Madison	Rushing	Latrele Palmer	27 rushes, 106 yards, 3 TD
James Madison	Receiving	Kris Thornton	4 receptions, 97 yards

=== At Arkansas State ===
	1	2	3	4	Total
Dukes	0	14	7	21	42
Red Wolves	0	3	10	7	20

=== At Georgia Southern ===
	1	2	3	4	Total
No. 25 Dukes	7	10	7	14	38
Eagles	0	14	17	14	45

=== Marshall ===
Game Seven – Marshall Thundering Herd (3–3) at James Madison Dukes (5–1)

Quarter	1	2	3	4	Total
Thundering Herd	2	7	10	7	26
Dukes	12	0	0	0	12

at Bridgeforth Stadium • Harrisonburg, VA

- Date: Saturday, October 22, 2022
- Game time: 3:30 p.m. EDT
- Game weather: Sunny • Temperature: 67 °F (19 °C) • Wind: NE 3 mph
- Game attendance: 26,159
- Referee: Trennis Livingston
- TV announcers (ESPN+): Curt Dudley (play-by-play), Vad Lee (analyst)

Game information

First quarter

- (7:07) JMU – Camden Wise 35 yard field goal (Drive: 7 plays, 61 yards, 2:12; James Madison 3–0)
- (3:24) JMU – Zach Horton 17 yard pass from Billy Atkins (Drive: 1 play, 17 yards, 0:06; James Madison 9–0)
- (3:24) MRSH – E. J. Jackson 85 yard PAT return (James Madison 9–2)
- (1:07) JMU – Camden Wise 25 yard field goal (Drive: 5 plays, 40 yards, 1:46; James Madison 12–2)

Second quarter

- (9:54) MRSH – Khalan Laborn 61 yard run, Rece Verhoff kick (Drive: 4 plays, 84 yards, 1:11; James Madison 12–9)

Third quarter

- (13:17) MRSH – Corey Gammage 57 yard pass from Cam Fancher, Rece Verhoff kick (Drive: 1 play, 57 yards, 0:10; Marshall 16–12)
- (8:10) MRSH – Rece Verhoff 38 yard field goal (Drive: 4 plays, 6 yards, 1:18; Marshall 19–12)

Fourth quarter

- (4:07) MRSH – Khalan Laborn 18 yard run, Rece Verhoff kick (Drive: 2 plays, 20 yards, 0:49; Marshall 26–12)

Statistics	MRSH	JMU
First downs	12	10
Plays–yards	75–326	72–247
Rushes–yards	44–167	37–83
Passing yards	159	164
Passing: comp–att–int	15–31–2	13–35–4
Turnovers		
Time of possession	31:34	28:26

Team	Category	Player	Statistics
Marshall	Passing	Cam Fancher	15/31, 159 yards, 1 TD, 2 INT
Marshall	Rushing	Khalan Laborn	30 carries, 151 yards, 2 TD
Marshall	Receiving	Corey Gammage	5 receptions, 107 yards, 1 TD
James Madison	Passing	Billy Atkins	13/35, 164 yards, 1 TD, 4 INT
James Madison	Rushing	Percy Agyei-Obese	20 carries, 96 yards
James Madison	Receiving	Terrance Greene, Jr	3 receptions, 66 yards

=== Louisville ===
	1	2	3	4	Total
Dukes	3	7	0	0	10
Cardinals	7	3	10	14	34

=== At Old Dominion ===
	1	2	3	4	Total
Dukes	7	10	13	7	37
Monarchs	0	3	0	0	3

Statistics

Statistics	JMU	ODU
First downs	22	11
Total yards	491	227
Rushing yards	187	78
Passing yards	304	149
Turnovers	2	4
Time of possession	38:12	21:48

Team	Category	Player	Statistics
James Madison	Passing	Todd Centeio	18/21, 304 yards, 1 INT
James Madison	Rushing	Percy Agyei-Obese	16 carries, 82 yards, 1 TD
James Madison	Receiving	Kris Thornton	6 receptions, 140 yards
Old Dominion	Passing	Hayden Wolff	12/22, 112 yards, 2 INT
Old Dominion	Rushing	Hayden Wolff	9 carries, 27 yards
Old Dominion	Receiving	Ahmarian Granger	4 receptions, 46 yards

=== Georgia State ===
	1	2	3	4	Total
Panthers	10	24	0	6	40
Dukes	7	7	21	7	42

=== No. 23 Coastal Carolina ===
	1	2	3	4	Total
No. 23 Chanticleers	7	0	0	0	7
Dukes	3	17	20	7	47

== Rankings ==
Ranking movements Legend: ██ Increase in ranking ██ Decrease in ranking — = Not ranked RV = Received votes
	Week															
Poll	Pre	1	2	3	4	5	6	7	8	9	10	11	12	13	14	Final
AP	—	—	—	—	RV	RV	25	RV	—	—	—	—	—	RV	RV	—
Coaches	—	—	—	—	RV	RV	RV	—	—	—	—	—	—	RV	—	—
CFP	Not released									—	—	—	—	—	—	Not released
