= 2022 Sun Belt Conference Football Championship Game =

- 4th SBC Championship Game
Coastal Carolina Chanticleers	Troy Trojans
(9–2)	(10–2)
26	45
Head coach: Jamey Chadwell	Head coach: Jon Sumrall
	1	2	3	4	Total
Coastal Carolina	0	7	6	13	26
Troy	17	14	14	0	45
- Date: December 3, 2022
- Season: 2022
- Stadium: Veterans Memorial Stadium
- Location: Troy, Alabama
- MVP: QB Gunnar Watson, Troy
- Favorite: Troy by 8
- Referee: Wayne Winkler
- Attendance: 21,554

United States TV coverage
- Network: ESPN
- Announcers: Dave Flemming, Rod Gilmore and Tiffany Blackmon

2022 Sun Belt Conference football standings
	Conf.			Overall
Team	W		L	W		L
East Division
Coastal Carolina xy	6	–	2	9	–	4
James Madison* x	6	–	2	8	–	3
Marshall	5	–	3	9	–	4
Georgia Southern	3	–	5	6	–	7
Appalachian State	3	–	5	6	–	6
Georgia State	3	–	5	4	–	8
Old Dominion	2	–	6	3	–	9
West Division
No. 19 Troy xy$	7	–	1	12	–	2
South Alabama x	7	–	1	10	–	3
Southern Miss	4	–	4	7	–	6
Louisiana	4	–	4	6	–	7
Louisiana–Monroe	3	–	5	4	–	8
Texas State	2	–	6	4	–	8
Arkansas State	1	–	7	3	–	9
Championship: Troy 45, Coastal Carolina 26
$ – Conference champion; x – Division champion/co-champions; y – Championship game participant; * – Ineligible for postseason play due to FCS-to-FBS transition rules; Rankings from AP Poll

The 2022 Sun Belt Conference Football Championship Game was a college football game played on December 3, 2022, at Veterans Memorial Stadium in Troy, Alabama. It was the fourth edition of the Sun Belt Conference Football Championship Game and determined the champion of the Sun Belt Conference for the 2022 season. The game began at 2:40 p.m. CST on ESPN. The game featured the Coastal Carolina Chanticleers, the East Division champions, and the Troy Trojans, the West Division champions. Sponsored by tire company Hercules Tires, the game was officially known as the 2022 Hercules Tires Sun Belt Football Championship.

== Teams ==
=== Coastal Carolina Chanticleers ===
Coastal Carolina clinched a spot in the championship game following their defeat of Southern Miss on November 12.

=== Troy Trojans ===
Troy clinched a spot in the championship game following their defeat of Arkansas State on November 26. The win also ensured they would host the game. Troy is looking for its first Sun Belt title since 2017 and first outright title since 2009.

== Game Summary ==
2022 Hercules Tires Sun Belt Football Championship
Coastal Carolina Chanticleers (9–2, 6–2) vs. Troy Trojans (10–2, 7–2)

Quarter	1	2	3	4	Total
Coastal Carolina	0	7	6	13	26
Troy	17	14	14	0	45

at Veterans Memorial Stadium • Troy, Alabama

- Date: Saturday, December 3, 2022
- Game time: 2:40 p.m CDT
- Game weather: 78 °F (26 °C) • Overcast • Wind 4 mph (6.4 km/h) WSW
- Game attendance: 21,554
- Referee: Wayne Winkler
- TV announcers (ESPN): Dave Flemming, Rod Gilmore and Tiffany Blackmon

Game information

First Quarter

- (11:07) TROY – Brooks Bruce 35 yard field goal (Drive: 9 plays, 57 yards, 3:53; Troy 3–0)
- (9:28) TROY – Deshon Stoudemire 65 yard pass from Gunnar Watson, Brooks Bruce kick (Drive: 1 play, 65 yards, 0:12; Troy 10–0)
- (4:09) TROY – DK Billingsley 8 yard rush, Brooks Bruce kick (Drive: 4 plays, 62 yards, 1:43; Troy 17–0)

Second Quarter

- (12:36) TROY – DK Billingsley 33 yard rush, Brooks Bruce kick (Drive: 2 plays, 48 yards, 0:45; Troy 24–0)
- (9:47) TROY – RaJae' Johnson 67 yard pass from Gunnar Watson, Brooks Bruce kick (Drive: 5 plays, 74 yards, 1:46; Troy 31–0)
- (0:29) CCU – Grayson McCall 8 yard rush, Kade Hensley kick (Drive: 9 plays, 70 yards, 3:35; Troy 31–7)

Third Quarter

- (12:08) CCU – Jared Brown 30 yard pass from Grayson McCall, two-point pass conversion failed (Drive: 6 plays, 75 yards, 2:52; Troy 31–13)
- (8:42) TROY – RaJae' Johnson 36 yard pass from Gunnar Watson, Brooks Bruce kick (Drive: 6 plays, 72 yards, 3:26; Troy 38–13)
- (4:49) TROY – DK Billingsley 3 yard rush, Brooks Bruce kick (Drive: 8 plays, 7 yards, 3:40; Troy 45–13)

Fourth Quarter

- (14:55) CCU – Sam Pinckney 11 yard pass from Grayson McCall, two-point pass conversion failed (Drive: 10 plays, 75 yards, 4:54; Troy 45–19)
- (6:09) CCU – Tyson Mobley 21 yard pass from Grayson McCall, Kade Hensley kick (Drive: 10 plays, 85 yards, 4:03; Troy 45–26)

Statistics	Coastal Carolina	Troy
First downs	27	16
plays–yards	72–432	53–411
Rushes/yards	31–113	36–93
Passing yards	319	318
Passing: Comp–Att–Int	29–41–1	12–17–0
Time of possession	32:22	27:38

Team	Category	Player	Statistics
Coastal Carolina	Passing	Grayson McCall	29/41, 319 yards, 3 TDs, 1 INT
Coastal Carolina	Rushing	Reese White	8 carries, 44 yards
Coastal Carolina	Receiving	Tyson Mobley	7 receptions, 109 yards, 1 TD
Troy	Passing	Gunnar Watson	12/17, 318 yards, 3 TDs
Troy	Rushing	DK Billingsley	9 carries, 57 yards, 3 TDs
Troy	Receiving	RaJae' Johnson	4 receptions, 134 yards, 2 TDs
