= 2022 Birmingham Bowl =

Postseason college football bowl game

2022 TicketSmarter Birmingham Bowl
- 16th Birmingham Bowl
Coastal Carolina Chanticleers	East Carolina Pirates
(9–3)	(7–5)
Sun Belt	The American
29	53
Head coach: Chad Staggs (interim)	Head coach: Mike Houston
	1	2	3	4	Total
Coastal Carolina	0	14	7	8	29
East Carolina	10	14	14	15	53
- Date: December 27, 2022
- Season: 2022
- Stadium: Protective Stadium
- Location: Birmingham, Alabama
- MVP: Holton Ahlers (QB, East Carolina)
- Favorite: East Carolina by 7
- Referee: Tuta Salaam (Big 12)
- Attendance: 15,901
- Payout: US$1,374,545

United States TV coverage
- Network: ESPN
- Announcers: Tiffany Greene (play-by-play), Jay Walker (analyst), and Jalyn Johnson (sideline)

International TV coverage
- Network: ESPN Deportes

The 2022 Birmingham Bowl was a college football bowl game played on December 27, 2022, at Protective Stadium in Birmingham, Alabama. The 16th annual Birmingham Bowl, the game featured Coastal Carolina of the Sun Belt Conference and East Carolina of the American Athletic Conference. The game began at 5:50 p.m. CST and was aired on ESPN. It was one of the 2022–23 bowl games concluding the 2022 FBS football season. Sponsored by ticket sales company TicketSmarter, the game was officially known as the TicketSmarter Birmingham Bowl.

== Teams ==
This was the first time that Coastal Carolina and East Carolina faced each other.

=== Coastal Carolina ===
Coastal Carolina compiled a 9–2 regular season record, 6–2 in conference play. They had a non-conference game against Virginia canceled. The Chanticleers qualified for the Sun Belt Conference Championship Game, which they lost to Troy, thus entered the bowl with a 9–3 overall record. Coastal Carolina did not face any ranked opponents during the season.

=== East Carolina ===
East Carolina played to a 7–5 regular-season record, 4–4 in conference play. They faced one ranked opponent during the season, losing to NC State in their first game. The Pirates played in, and lost, the January 2015 edition of the Birmingham Bowl. They also played in, and lost, the December 2006 edition of the game, when it was known as the PapaJohns.com Bowl. They played in the 2022 Birmingham Bowl and defeated Coastal Carolina University, securing their first bowl victory since 2013.

=== Officials ===
The officials for the game were from the Big 12 Conference and were:

Referee: Tutashinda Salaam

Umpire: Sheldon Davis

Head Line Judge: Bradford Edwards

Line Judge: David Young

Field Judge: Ed Vinzant

Side Judge: Rick Ockey

Back Judge: Joel Wetzel

Center Judge: Darren Winkley

Alternate: Marvel July

Replay Official: Dee Anderson

Communicator: Terry Porter

== Game summary ==
2022 TicketSmarter Birmingham Bowl

Quarter	1	2	3	4	Total
Coastal Carolina	0	14	7	8	29
East Carolina	10	14	14	15	53

at Protective Stadium • Birmingham, Alabama

- Date: Tuesday, December 27, 2022
- Game time: 5:45 p.m. CST
- Game weather: Sunny • Temperature: not reported • Wind: 8 mph (13 km/h) southwest
- Game attendance: 15,901
- Referee: Tuta Salaam
- TV announcers (ESPN): Tiffany Greene (play-by-play), Jay Walker (analyst), and Jalyn Johnson (sideline)
- Box score

Scoring summary

Quarter	Time	Drive			Team	Scoring information	Score	
Quarter	Time	Plays	Yards	TOP	Team	Scoring information	Coastal Carolina	East Carolina
1	10:52	10	70	4:08	East Carolina	28-yard field goal by Andrew Conrad	0	3
1	3:47	5	77	2:22	East Carolina	Isaiah Winstead 15-yard touchdown reception from Holton Ahlers, Andrew Conrad kick good	0	10
2	14:38	9	60	4:09	Coastal Carolina	Reese White 1-yard touchdown run, Kade Hensley kick good	7	10
2	8:52	7	68	2:46	Coastal Carolina	Grayson McCall 9-yard touchdown run, Kade Hensley kick good	14	10
2	6:37	6	53	2:15	East Carolina	Isaiah Winstead 11-yard touchdown reception from Holton Ahlers, Andrew Conrad kick good	14	17
2	1:44	8	64	3:17	East Carolina	Keaton Mitchell 1-yard touchdown run, Andrew Conrad kick good	14	24
3	11:13	6	27	3:07	East Carolina	Jaylen Johnson 2-yard touchdown reception from Holton Ahlers, Andrew Conrad kick good	14	31
3	9:46	3	79	1:27	Coastal Carolina	Tyler Roberts 47-yard touchdown reception from Jarrett Guest, Kade Hensley kick good	21	31
3	2:36	7	61	2:51	East Carolina	Holton Ahlers 1-yard touchdown run, Andrew Conrad kick good	21	38
4	13:45	6	43	2:23	East Carolina	C.J. Johnson 15-yard touchdown reception from Holton Ahlers, Andrew Conrad kick good	21	45
4	6:07	4	12	1:06	Coastal Carolina	CJ Beasley 2-yard touchdown run, 2-point run good (Bryce Archie)	29	45
4	2:14	6	47	3:53	East Carolina	Shane Calhoun 15-yard touchdown reception from Holton Ahlers, 2-point pass good (Ahlers to Mitchell)	29	53
"TOP" = time of possession. For other American football terms, see Glossary of American football.							29	53

== Statistics ==
Team statistical comparison
Statistic	Coastal Carolina	East Carolina
First downs	20	24
First downs rushing	8	5
First downs passing	8	13
First downs penalty	4	6
Third down efficiency	5–12	5–11
Fourth down efficiency	0–1	2–4
Total plays–net yards	63–337	71–486
Rushing attempts–net yards	38–125	32–172
Yards per rush	3.3	5.4
Yards passing	212	314
Pass completions–attempts	17–25	27–39
Interceptions thrown	0	0
Punt returns–total yards	1–12	1–0
Kickoff returns–total yards	7–108	5–145
Punts–average yardage	4–38.3	1–0.0
Fumbles–lost	4–3	0–0
Penalties–yards	11–98	11–130
Time of possession	27:45	32:15

Coastal Carolina statistics
Chanticleers passing
	C–A	Yds	TD–INT
Jarrett Guest	6–11	136	1–0
Grayson McCall	10–12	67	0–0
Bryce Archie	1–2	9	0–0
Chanticleers rushing
	Car	Yds	TD
Reese White	11	67	1
Braydon Bennett	4	29	0
CJ Beasley	5	13	1
Grayson McCall	4	12	1
Bryce Archie	1	6	0
Logan Adkins	1	2	0
Jarrett Guest	10	-6	0
Chanticleers receiving
	Rec	Yds	TD
Sam Pinckney	4	79	0
Tyler Roberts	1	47	1
TJ Ivy Jr.	2	29	0
Reese White	1	15	0
Tyson Mobley	4	12	0
Dami'on Thompson	1	9	0
Patrick McSweeney	1	8	0
Jared Brown	2	7	0
CJ Beasley	1	6	0

East Carolina statistics
Pirates passing
	C–A	Yds	TD–INT
Holton Ahlers	26–38	300	5–0
C.J. Johnson	1–1	14	0–0
Pirates rushing
	Car	Yds	TD
Keaton Mitchell	22	127	1
Holton Ahlers	7	48	1
Kamarro Edmonds	2	-2	0
Pirates receiving
	Rec	Yds	TD
C.J. Johnson	7	83	1
Isaiah Winstead	6	72	2
Jaylen Johnson	5	66	1
Shane Calhoun	2	37	1
Taji Hudson	1	15	0
Keaton Mitchell	2	15	0
Holton Ahlers	1	14	0
Brock Spalding	1	5	0
Kamarro Edmonds	1	4	0
Tyler Savage	1	3	0
