= Chad Staggs =

American college football coach

Current position
- Title: Defensive coordinator
- Team: East Tennessee State
- Conference: SoCon

Biographical details
- Education: University of South Carolina Upstate (2000, B.S.); University of South Carolina (2002, M.S.)

Coaching career (HC unless noted)
- 2000–2002: Lexington HS (SC) (assistant)
- 2003–2007: South Carolina (GA)
- 2008: Charleston Southern (DB/STC)
- 2009–2010: North Greenville (DC)
- 2011: North Greenville (AHC/DC)
- 2012: Delta State (DC)
- 2013–2016: Charleston Southern (DC)
- 2017–2018: Furman (DC/S)
- 2019–2020: Coastal Carolina (DC/LB)
- 2021–2022: Coastal Carolina(DC/S)
- 2022: Coastal Carolina (interim HC)
- 2023: Georgia State (DC)
- 2024: Western Kentucky (senior DA)
- 2025–present: East Tennessee State (DC)

Head coaching record
- Overall: 0–1
- Bowls: 0–1

Chad Staggs is an American college football coach. He is currently the defensive coordinator for East Tennessee State University. He served as the interim head football coach at Coastal Carolina University for the final game of the 2022 season, following the resignation of Jamey Chadwell.

== Coaching career ==
Staggs began his coaching career in 2000, shortly after his graduation from the University of South Carolina Upstate, serving as an assistant coach at Lexington High School in Lexington, South Carolina in addition to coaching track and field at the school. In 2003, he joined the South Carolina staff as a graduate assistant. Holding this position for five years, Staggs worked with the defensive backs and linebackers, among other position groups. In 2008, Staggs departed South Carolina to take a position coaching defensive backs and special teams at Charleston Southern, though he would only stay in this position for one season.

Staggs then followed former Charleston Southern offensive coordinator Jamey Chadwell to North Greenville, where he would spend three years as the Crusaders' defensive coordinator (the final with the additional title of assistant head coach) and then to Delta State, where he spent one year as their defensive coordinator, before returning to the Division I ranks. When Chadwell was hired as Charleston Southern's head coach to begin the 2013 season, Staggs followed as his defensive coordinator. When Chadwell was suspended for one game during the 2016 season, Staggs filled his spot on the sidelines. After four seasons in his second stint in North Charleston, Staggs took an offer at Furman, where he served as the Paladins' defensive coordinator and safeties coach for two seasons.

In 2019, Staggs was hired again by Chadwell, now the head coach at Coastal Carolina, to serve as his defensive coordinator and linebackers coach. In 2021, he was put in charge of the safeties at Coastal Carolina, while still serving as the defensive coordinator.

== Personal life ==
Staggs attended the University of South Carolina Upstate and graduated in 2000 with a Bachelor of Science in math education. He later graduated from the University of South Carolina with a Master of Science in hotel, restaurant, and tourism management in 2002. He is married to his wife, Kelli, with whom he has two children.

== Head coaching record ==
Year	Team	Overall	Conference	Standing	Bowl/playoffs
Coastal Carolina Chanticleers (Sun Belt Conference) (2022)
2022	Coastal Carolina	0–1	0–0		L Birmingham
Coastal Carolina:		0–1	0–0		
Total:		0–1			
