= Willy Korn =

American football player and coach (born 1989)

Biographical details
- Born: January 21, 1989 (age 37); Lyman, South Carolina, U.S.
- Education: Clemson University

Playing career
- 2007–2009: Clemson
- 2010: Marshall
- 2010–2011: North Greenville
- Position: Quarterback

Coaching career (HC unless noted)
- 2013–2016: Charleston Southern (WR/RC)
- 2017–2018: Coastal Carolina (WR)
- 2019–2022: Coastal Carolina (co-OC/QB)
- 2023–2025: Liberty (co-OC/QB)

Willy Korn (born January 21, 1989) is an American football coach and former quarterback who was the co-offensive coordinator and quarterbacks coach at Liberty University from 2023-2025.

== Playing career ==
Ranked as one of the top quarterback prospects in the class of 2007, Korn committed to play college football at Clemson before his junior year at James F. Byrnes High School. After seeing some playing time in the garbage time of games his freshman year, he suffered injuries in back-to-back games and took a medical redshirt for the season. He received his first start as a redshirt freshman in 2008 in Dabo Swinney's first game as interim head coach against Georgia Tech, but suffered a shoulder injury 14 plays into the game. Unable to win the starting quarterback job from Kyle Parker after his injury, Korn transferred to Marshall after the 2009 season. He spent very little time at Marshall after the coaching staff told him his throwing arm wasn't strong enough and asked him to convert to safety, transferring once again to Division II North Greenville to play quarterback.

== Coaching career ==
Korn was named as the wide receivers coach at Charleston Southern in 2013, joining the staff of his former college coach at North Greenville, Jamey Chadwell.

Korn followed Chadwell to Coastal Carolina as the wide receivers coach while also handling kickoff coverage duties in 2017. He was promoted to co-offensive coordinator and reassigned to quarterbacks coach in 2019 following the promotion of Chadwell to head coach.

Korn was named the co-offensive coordinator and quarterbacks coach at Liberty under Chadwell on Dec. 30, 2022.
