= 2022 Louisiana–Monroe Warhawks football team =

American college football season

2022 Louisiana–Monroe Warhawks football
- Conference: Sun Belt Conference
- West Division
- Record: 4–8 (3–5 Sun Belt)
- Head coach: Terry Bowden (2nd season)
- Offensive coordinator: Matt Kubik (5th season)
- Offensive scheme: Spread option
- Defensive coordinator: Vic Koenning (1st season)
- Base defense: Multiple 3–3–5
- Home stadium: Malone Stadium

2022 Sun Belt Conference football standings
	Conf.			Overall
Team	W		L	W		L
East Division
James Madison* x	6	–	2	8	–	3
Coastal Carolina xy	6	–	2	9	–	4
Marshall	5	–	3	9	–	4
Georgia Southern	3	–	5	6	–	7
Appalachian State	3	–	5	6	–	6
Georgia State	3	–	5	4	–	8
Old Dominion	2	–	6	3	–	9
West Division
No. 19 Troy xy$	7	–	1	12	–	2
South Alabama x	7	–	1	10	–	3
Southern Miss	4	–	4	7	–	6
Louisiana	4	–	4	6	–	7
Louisiana–Monroe	3	–	5	4	–	8
Texas State	2	–	6	4	–	8
Arkansas State	1	–	7	3	–	9
Championship: Troy 45, Coastal Carolina 26
$ – Conference champion; x – Division champion/co-champions; y – Championship game participant; * – Ineligible for postseason play due to FCS-to-FBS transition rules; Rankings from AP Poll

The 2022 Louisiana–Monroe Warhawks football team represented the University of Louisiana at Monroe as a member of the West Division of the Sun Belt Conference during the 2022 NCAA Division I FBS football season. Led by second-year head coach Terry Bowden, the Warhawks compiled an overall record of 4–8 with a mark of 3–5 in conference play, placing fifth in the Sun Belt's West Division. Louisiana–Monroe played their home games at Malone Stadium in Monroe, Louisiana.

== Preseason ==
=== Sun Belt coaches poll ===
The Sun Belt coaches poll was released on July 25, 2022. The Warhawks were picked to finish last in the West Division.

=== Sun Belt Preseason All-Conference teams ===
==== Offense ====
2nd team

- Boogie Knight – Wide Receiver, GS

==== Special teams ====
2nd team

- Calum Sutherland – Kicker, 6th YR

== Schedule ==
Date	Time	Opponent	Site	TV	Result	Attendance
September 3	7:00 p.m.	at Texas*	Darrell K Royal–Texas Memorial Stadium; Austin, TX	LHN	L 10–52	94,873
September 10	7:00 p.m.	Nicholls*	Malone Stadium; Monroe, LA	ESPN3	W 35–7	13,536
September 17	3:00 p.m.	at No. 2 Alabama*	Bryant-Denny Stadium; Tuscaloosa, AL	SECN	L 7–63	98,433
September 24	7:00 p.m.	Louisiana	Malone Stadium; Monroe, Louisiana (Battle on the Bayou)	ESPN+	W 21–17	19,077
October 1	6:00 p.m.	at Arkansas State	Centennial Bank Stadium; Jonesboro, AR	ESPN+	L 28–45	18,172
October 8	7:00 p.m.	Coastal Carolina^{†}	Malone Stadium; Monroe, Louisiana	ESPN+	L 21–28	18,448
October 15	6:00 p.m.	at South Alabama	Hancock Whitney Stadium; Mobile, AL	NFLN	L 34–41	15,459
October 22	11:00 a.m.	at Army*	Michie Stadium; West Point, NY	CBSSN	L 24–48	30,132
November 5	4:00 p.m.	Texas State	Malone Stadium; Monroe, Louisiana	ESPN3	W 31–30	11,376
November 12	12:00 p.m.	at Georgia State	Center Parc Stadium; Atlanta, GA	ESPN+	W 31–28	12,241
November 19	2:30 p.m.	at Troy	Veterans Memorial Stadium; Troy, AL	ESPN+	L 16–34	23,864
November 26	4:00 p.m.	Southern Miss	Malone Stadium; Monroe, Louisiana	ESPN+	L 10–20	4,465
*Non-conference game; ^{†}Homecoming; Rankings from Coaches' Poll released prior to the game

== Game summaries ==
=== At Texas ===
Team	1	2	3	4	Total
ULM	3	0	0	7	10
• Texas	14	10	21	7	52

- Date: September 3
- Location: Darrell K Royal–Texas Memorial Stadium (Austin, TX)
- Game start: 7:00 p.m.
- Game attendance: 94,873
- Game weather: Sunny
- Referee: Chris Tallent
- TV announcers (LHN): Lowell Galindo (play-by-play), Sam Acho (color), and Alex Chappell (sideline)
- Sources:Stats

Statistics	ULM	Texas
First downs	12	22
Total yards	259	383
Rushing yards	92	134
Passing yards	167	249
Turnovers	1	1
Time of possession	35:26	24:34

Team	Category	Player	Statistics
ULM	Passing	Chandler Rogers	14–19, 108 yards, 0 TD, 1 INT
ULM	Rushing	Zach Martin	4 carries, 39 yards, 1 TD
ULM	Receiving	Jevin Frett	4 receptions, 61 yards, 0 TD
Texas	Passing	Quinn Ewers	16–24, 225 yards, 2 TD, 1 INT
Texas	Rushing	Bijan Robinson	10 carries, 71 yards, 1 TD
Texas	Receiving	Ja'Tavion Sanders	6 receptions, 85 yards, 1 TD

=== Nicholls ===
Team	1	2	3	4	Total
Nicholls	7	0	0	0	7
• ULM	0	21	7	7	35

- Date: September 10
- Location: Malone Stadium (Monroe, LA)
- Game start: 7:00 p.m.
- Game attendance: 13,536
- Game weather: 80 °F (27 °C) • Weather: Sunny • Wind: N 8 MPH
- Referee: Chris Tallent
- Television network: ESPN3

Statistics	ULM	Nicholls
First downs	14	23
Total yards	306	424
Rushing yards	75	167
Passing yards	231	257
Turnovers	1	0
Time of possession	28:45	31:15

Team	Category	Player	Statistics
ULM	Passing	Chandler Rogers	20–25, 253 yards, 2 TD
ULM	Rushing	Malik Jackson	12 carries, 55 yards, 1 TD
ULM	Receiving	Alred Luke	3 receptions, 72 yards
Nicholls	Passing	Kohen Granier	26–42, 231 yards, 1 TD, 1 INT
Nicholls	Rushing	Julien Gums	9 carries, 35 yards
Nicholls	Receiving	Lee Negrotto	2 receptions, 43 yards

=== At No. 2 Alabama ===
Team	1	2	3	4	Total
ULM	0	7	0	0	7
• No. 2 Alabama	28	7	14	14	63

- Date: September 17
- Location: Tuscaloosa, AL
- Game start: 3:01 p.m.
- Game attendance: 98,433
- Game weather: 85, Sunny, Wind E @ 4 mph
- TV announcers (SEC Network): Taylor Zarzour (play-by-play), Matt Stinchcomb (color), Coley Harvey (sideline)

Statistics	ULM	Alabama
First downs	11	23
Total yards	169	509
Rushing yards	78	273
Passing yards	91	236
Turnovers	1	2
Time of possession	36:23	23:37

Team	Category	Player	Statistics
ULM	Passing	Chandler Rogers	11/21, 96 yards, 1 INT
ULM	Rushing	Malik Jackson	13 carries, 36 yards, 1 TD
ULM	Receiving	Zach Rasmussen	4 receptions, 39 yards
Alabama	Passing	Bryce Young	13/18, 236 yards, 3 TDs, 2 INTs
Alabama	Rushing	Roydell Williams	8 carries, 58 yards, 1 TD
Alabama	Receiving	Jahmyr Gibbs	4 receptions, 65 yards, 1 TD

Scoring summary

Quarter	Time	Drive			Team	Scoring information	Score	
Quarter	Time	Plays	Yards	TOP	Team	Scoring information	ULM	ALA
1st	13:12	4	75		ALA	Traeshon Holden (#11) 33-yard touchdown reception from Bryce Young (#9), Will Reichard (#16) kick good	0	7
1st	10:52	2	-3	0:35	ALA	Interception returned 25 yards for touchdown by Will Anderson Jr. (#31), Will Reichard (#16) kick good	0	14
1st	8:50	3	-1	2:02	ALA	Malachi Moore (#13) 3 yrd block punt return	0	21
1st	4:21	4	41	1:45	ALA	Bryce Young (#9) 7-yard touchdown run, Will Reichard (#16) kick good	0	28
2nd	10:11	8	57	4:50	ULM	Malik Jackson (#2) 11-yard touchdown run, Calum Sutherland (#31) kick good	7	28
2nd	0:52	6	93	1:05	ALA	Amari Niblack (#84) 15-yard touchdown reception from Bryce Young (#9), Will Reichard (#16) kick good	7	35
3rd	8:41	4	53	1:23	ALA	Jahmyr Gibbs (#1) 37-yard touchdown reception from Bryce Young (#9), Will Reichard (#16) kick good	7	42
3rd	4:30	5	55	1:56	ALA	Roydell Williams (#5) 10-yard touchdown run, Will Reichard (#16) kick good	7	49
4th	12:36	3	8	2:17	ALA	Punt returned 68 yards for touchdown by Brian Branch (#14), Will Reichard (#16) kick good	7	56
4th	7:36	10	49	3:17	ALA	Trey Sanders (#6) 6-yard touchdown run, Will Reichard (#16) kick good	7	63
"TOP" = time of possession. For other American football terms, see Glossary of American football.							ULM 7	ALA 63

=== Louisiana ===
Louisiana at Louisiana–Monroe

Team	1	2	3	4	Total
Ragin' Cajuns	14	3	0	0	17
• ULM	7	0	0	14	21

- Date: September 24, 2022
- Location: Malone Stadium
  Monroe, Louisiana
- Game start: 7:02 p.m. CDT
- Elapsed time: 3 hours and 22 minutes
- Game attendance: 19,077
- Game weather: 91 °F (33 °C) • Weather: Sunny • Wind: SW 7 MPH
- Referee: Jeremy Parker
- TV announcers (ESPN+): Nick White (play–by–play) and Desmond Lighten (analyst)

Scoring summary
1	07:56	LA	Chandler Fields 9-yard rush (Preston Stafford kick) (6 plays, 76 yards, 2:18)	LA 7–0
1	07:02	ULM	Andrew Henry 75-yard rush (Calum Sutherland kick) (2 plays, 79 yards, 0:47)	TIE 7–7
1	05:11	LA	Michael Jefferson 50-yard pass from Chandler Fields (Preston Stafford kick) (4 plays, 60 yards, 1:51)	LA 14–7
2	07:25	LA	Preston Stafford 28-yard field goal (4 plays, 9 yards, 2:15)	LA 17–7
3	11:07	ULM	Chandler Rogers 5-yard rush (Calum Sutherland kick) (2 plays, 8 yards, 0:39)	LA 17–14
3	06:51	ULM	Malik Jackson 2-yard rush (Calum Sutherland kick) (3 plays, 90 yards, 1:20)	ULM 21–17

Statistics	ULM	ULL
First downs	18	15
Total yards	354	419
Rushing yards	86	227
Passing yards	268	192
Turnovers	2	2
Time of possession	32:45	27:15

Team	Category	Player	Statistics
ULM	Passing	Chandler Rogers	14/26, 192 yards, 1 INT
ULM	Rushing	Andrew Henry	11 carries, 123 yards, 1 TD
ULM	Receiving	Tyrone Howell	3 receptions, 124 yards
ULL	Passing	Chandler Fields	20/34, 231 yards, 1 TD, 1 INT
ULL	Rushing	Chris Smith	10 carries, 41 yards
ULL	Receiving	Michael Jefferson	5 receptions, 105 yards, 1 TD

=== At Arkansas State ===
	1	2	3	4	Total
Warhawks	7	7	7	7	28
Red Wolves	10	14	14	7	45

=== Coastal Carolina ===
	1	2	3	4	Total
Chanticleers	14	14	0	0	28
Warhawks	7	7	7	0	21

=== At South Alabama ===
	1	2	3	4	Total
Warhawks	7	13	0	14	34
Jaguars	10	7	17	7	41

=== At Army ===
Louisiana–Monroe Warhawks at Army Black Knights

Quarter	1	2	3	4	Total
Warhawks	3	14	0	7	24
Black Knights	7	7	17	17	48

at Michie Stadium, West Point, NY

- Date: October 22, 2022
- Game time: 12:00 p.m. EDT
- Game weather: Temperature: 62 °F (17 °C) • Wind: N 5 mph • Weather: Sunny
- Game attendance: 30,132
- Referee: Marcus Woods
- TV announcers (CBSSN): Jason Knapp (play-by-play), Ross Tucker (analyst) & Tina Cervasio (sideline)
- ESPN – Jones scores 3 TDs in Army's 48–24 victory over ULM /// Box Score, Louisiana–Monroe at Army /// Army Pregame Notes /// Louisiana–Monroe Pregame Notes /// Postgame Notes

Game information

First quarter

- (09:19) ULM FG – Calum Sutherland 22-yard field goal
  Drive: 12 plays, 70 yards, 5:41; Louisiana–Monroe 3–0
- (06:02) ARMY TD – Jemel Jones 31-yard rush, Quinn Maretzki kick
  Drive: 6 plays, 75 yards, 3:17; Army 7–3

Second quarter

- (12:49) ULM TD – Boogie Knight 12-yard pass from Chandler Rogers, Calum Sutherland kick
  Drive: 1 play, 12 yards, 0:06; Louisiana–Monroe 10–7
- (05:43) ULM TD – Andrew Henry 10-yard rush, Calum Sutherland kick
  Drive: 6 plays, 98 yards, 2:33; Louisiana–Monroe 17–7
- (00:38) ARMY TD – Jemel Jones 2-yard rush, Quinn Maretzki kick
  Drive: 11 plays, 75 yards, 5:05; Louisiana–Monroe 17–14

Third quarter

- (09:23) ARMY FG – Quinn Maretzki 38-yard field goal
  Drive: 10 plays, 34 yards, 5:24; Tied 17–17
- (03:40) ARMY TD – Jemel Jones 6-yard rush, Quinn Maretzki kick
  Drive: 9 plays, 49 yards, 5:12; Army 24–17
- (00:12) ARMY TD – Tyson Riley 3-yard rush, Quinn Maretzki kick
  Drive: 5 plays, 60 yards, 2:12; Army 31–17

Fourth quarter

- (06:35) ARMY TD – Jakobi Buchanan 3-yard rush, Quinn Maretzki kick
  Drive: 8 plays, 55 yards, 5:07; Army 38–17
- (05:03) ULM TD – Jevin Frett 23-yard pass from Chandler Rogers, Calum Sutherland kick
  Drive: 6 plays, 75 yards, 1:25; Army 38–24
- (03:48) ARMY FG – Quinn Maretzki 37-yard field goal
  Drive: 5 plays, 23 yards, 1:13; Army 41–24
- (01:22) ARMY TD – Bryson Daily 64-yard rush, Trey Gronotte kick
  Drive: 2 plays, 65 yards, 0:54; Army 48–24

Passing

- ULM – Chandler Rogers: 21/28, 164 yards, 2 TD, 1 INT
- ARMY – Jemel Jones: 2/4, 41 yards

Rushing

- ULM – Bugs Mortimer: 2 carries, 75 yards
- ARMY – Jemel Jones: 17 carries, 96 yards, 3 TD

Receiving

- ULM – Jevin Frett: 3 receptions, 45 yards, 1 TD
- ARMY – Ay'Jaun Marshall: 1 reception, 36 yards

Defense

- ULM – Quae Drake: 9 total tackles (6 solo, 3 assisted)
- ARMY – Leo Lowin: 11 total tackles (6 solo, 5 assisted), 1 tackle for loss, 1 sack, 1 interception

Statistics	ULM	ARMY
First downs	20	24
3rd down efficiency	4–11	3–8
4th down efficiency	0–2	1–2
Plays–yards	57–349	66–482
Rushes–yards	29–185	62–441
Passing yards	164	41
Passing: Comp–Att–Int	21–28–1	2–4–0
Penalties–yards	4–26	6–59
Turnovers	1	0
Time of possession	24:39	35:21

=== Texas State ===
	1	2	3	4	Total
Bobcats	21	3	3	3	30
Warhawks	0	17	7	7	31

Statistics	TXST	ULM
First downs	19	23
Total yards	367	380
Rushing yards	130	67
Passing yards	237	313
Turnovers	0	4
Time of possession	31:31	28:29

Team	Category	Player	Statistics
Texas State	Passing	Layne Hatcher	29/41, 237 yards, 2 TD
Texas State	Rushing	Lincoln Pare	25 rushes, 100 yards, TD
Texas State	Receiving	Julian Ortega-Jones	8 receptions, 92 yards
Louisiana–Monroe	Passing	Chandler Rogers	28/40, 310 yards, 2 TD, INT
Louisiana–Monroe	Rushing	Malik Jackson	12 rushes, 47 yards, TD
Louisiana–Monroe	Receiving	Tyrone Howell	12 receptions, 176 yards, 2 TD

=== At Georgia State ===
	1	2	3	4	Total
Warhawks	3	17	0	11	31
Panthers	14	7	7	0	28

=== At Troy ===
	1	2	3	4	Total
Warhawks	0	3	7	6	16
Trojans	3	17	7	7	34

=== Southern Miss ===
	1	2	3	4	Total
Golden Eagles	10	0	0	10	20
Warhawks	0	7	3	0	10
