= Gunnar Watson =

American football player (born 2000)

Profile
- Position: Quarterback

Personal information
- Born: January 11, 2000 (age 26); Butler, Georgia, U.S.
- Listed height: 6 ft 3 in (1.91 m)
- Listed weight: 210 lb (95 kg)

Career information
- High school: Taylor County (Butler)
- College: Troy (2018–2023)
- NFL draft: 2024: undrafted

Career history
- Buffalo Bills (2024)*
- * Offseason or practice squad member only

Awards and highlights
- Sun Belt Football Championship MVP (2022); Third-team All-Sun Belt (2023)

Milton Gunnar Watson (born January 11, 2000) is an American professional football quarterback. He played college football for the Troy Trojans.

== Early life ==
Watson grew up in Butler, Georgia and attended Taylor County High School where he lettered in football and baseball. He was rated a three-star recruit and committed to play college football at Troy over offers from Austin Peay, Mercer and South Alabama.

== College career ==
During Watson's true freshman season in 2018, he played in two games as a reserve quarterback and finished the season completing 8 out of 14 passing attempts for 45 yards. During the 2019 season, he played as the backup quarterback playing in six games and finishing the year with completing 13 out of 22 passing attempts for 89 yards. During the 2020 season, Watson was named as the starting quarterback. He started in nine games during the season and finished the season with completing 211 out of 307 passing attempts for 2,141 yards, 16 touchdowns and seven interceptions. During the game against Texas State, he made 33 completions which had him named the Sun Belt Offensive Player of the Week, a Manning Award Star of the Week and the Davey O'Brien Great 8 List. During the 2021 season, he played in eight games and finished the season with completing 140 out of 228 passing attempts for 1,613 yards, eight touchdowns and four interceptions. During the 2022 season, he played in 13 games and finished the season with completing 206 out of 335 passing attempts for 2,818 yards and 14 touchdowns. He was named the MVP of the 2022 Sun Belt Conference Football Championship Game after completing 12 out of 17 passing attempts for 318 yards and three touchdowns.

=== College statistics ===
Year	Team	Games			Passing								Rushing			
Year	Team	GP	GS	Record	Cmp	Att	Pct	Yds	Avg	TD	Int	Rtg	Att	Yds	Avg	TD
2018	Troy	2	0	—	8	12	66.7	45	3.8	0	0	98.2	4	-18	-4.5	0
2019	Troy	6	0	—	13	22	59.1	89	4.0	0	0	93.1	0	0	0.0	0
2020	Troy	9	9	4−5	211	301	70.1	2,141	7.1	16	7	142.7	30	-66	-2.2	0
2021	Troy	8	7	3−4	140	228	61.4	1,613	7.1	8	4	128.9	27	-64	-2.4	1
2022	Troy	13	12	10−2	206	335	61.5	2,818	8.4	14	12	138.8	61	-173	-2.8	2
2023	Troy	14	14	11−3	268	439	61.0	3,569	8.1	27	6	146.9	51	-106	-2.1	1
Career		52	42	28−14	846	1,337	63.3	10,275	7.7	65	29	139.5	173	-427	-2.5	4
