= Jamey Chadwell =

American football player and coach (born 1977)

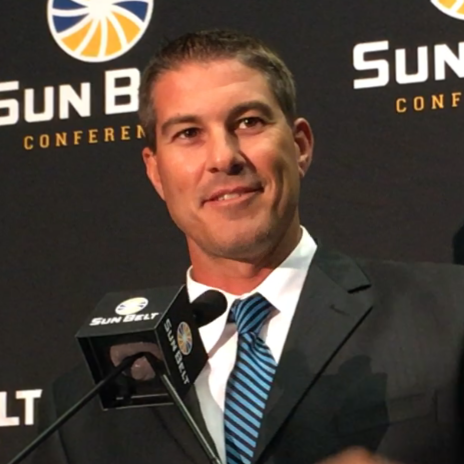
- Chadwell at 2017 Sun Belt Media Day

Current position
- Title: Head coach
- Team: Liberty
- Conference: CUSA
- Record: 35–14
- Annual salary: $4 million

Biographical details
- Born: January 10, 1977 (age 49); Caryville, Tennessee, U.S.

Playing career
- 1995–1999: East Tennessee State
- Position: Quarterback

Coaching career (HC unless noted)
- 2000–2003: East Tennessee State (QB/RB/TE)
- 2004–2008: Charleston Southern (OC/RC)
- 2009–2011: North Greenville
- 2012: Delta State
- 2013–2016: Charleston Southern
- 2017: Coastal Carolina (interim HC / OC / QB)
- 2018: Coastal Carolina (AHC/OC/QB)
- 2019–2022: Coastal Carolina
- 2023–present: Liberty

Head coaching record
- Overall: 133–71
- Bowls: 2–3
- Tournaments: 2–1 (NCAA D-II playoffs); 1–2 (NCAA D-I playoffs)

Accomplishments and honors

Championships
- 2 Big South (2015–2016); 1 Sun Belt (2020); 1 C-USA (2023); 2 Sun Belt East Division (2020, 2022)

Awards
- AP College Football Coach of the Year (2020); Walter Camp Coach of the Year Award (2020); Home Depot Coach of the Year (2020); Eddie Robinson Coach of the Year (2020); George Munger Award (2020); Sun Belt Coach of the Year (2020); C-USA Coach of the Year (2023); Paul Bear Bryant G5 Coach of the Year (2023)

Jamey Chadwell (born January 10, 1977) is an American college football coach and former player. He is the head football coach at Liberty University, a position he has held since the 2023 season. Chadwell served as the head football coach at North Greenville University from 2009 to 2011, Delta State University in 2012, Charleston Southern University from 2013 and 2016, and Coastal Carolina University, first in an interim capacity in 2017 and then on a permanent basis from 2019 to 2022.

Chadwell grew up in Tennessee and attended East Tennessee State University, where he played quarterback from 1995 to 1999. He began his coaching career in 2000 at East Tennessee State before taking an assistant position at Charleston Southern in 2004. Chadwell spearheaded a remarkable turnaround in college football history. Charleston Southern was 0–11 in 2011, yet just two seasons later, they were competing for the conference championship. He later won several coach of the year awards for leading his 2020 Coastal Carolina team to an 11–1 record.

== Coaching career ==
After his playing career ended, Chadwell began his coaching career at his alma mater East Tennessee State in 2000. He remained as an offensive assistant with the Buccaneers through the 2003 season when he left to take a position at Charleston Southern.

=== Head coaching career ===
After serving as an assistant offensive coach with the Charleston Southern Buccaneers, on February 6, 2009, Chadwell was hired as the head coach at North Greenville University. During his three-year tenure with the Crusaders, Chadwell had an overall record of 20 wins and 14 losses (20–14). He also led the Crusaders to their first all-time appearance in the NCAA Division II football playoffs following the 2011 season. In the playoffs, Chadwell led the Crusaders to the quarterfinals where they lost to Delta State 28–23.

On January 2, 2012, Chadwell was hired by Delta State to succeed Ron Roberts as the head coach of the Statesmen. Chadwell resigned as head coach of the Statesmen after only one season on January 17, 2013, to take the same position with Charleston Southern. During his one season at Delta State, he compiled an overall record of 3 wins and 7 losses.

On January 17, 2013, Chadwell was formally introduced as the third-ever head coach at Charleston Southern.

On January 8, 2017, Chadwell was named the new offensive coordinator at Coastal Carolina.

On July 28, 2017, Chadwell was named interim head coach for Coastal Carolina as head coach Joe Moglia took a medical leave of absence. Coastal Carolina finished with a 3–9 record on the season. Despite the losing record, the Chanticleers had five losses by a touchdown or less. The school announced on January 5, 2018, that Moglia had been medically cleared to return to full-time coaching and would reassume the head coaching position.

In 2018, the NCAA released a detailed report concerning numerous NCAA violations across the Charleston Southern athletic department that occurred during Chadwell's tenure as head football coach. The athletic department was found to have incorrectly certified 55 student athletes across 12 sports over a six-year period, and football players were found to have used scholarship funds to purchase electronics and jewelry from the campus book store. Ultimately, the NCAA sanctions included vacating 18 wins from the 2014 and 2015 football seasons and the 2015 Big South Championship, in addition to several vacated wins in other sports. Also vacated were three wins over crosstown rival The Citadel, games during which CSU used ineligible players.

=== Coastal Carolina ===
On January 18, 2019, Chadwell was formally introduced as the third head coach at Coastal Carolina. Coastal Carolina finished with a 5–7 record, highlighted by victories over Kansas and Troy.

In the 2020 season, Chadwell led the Chanticleers to an 11–0 start and a #9 ranking in the AP Poll. The season saw a 22–17 victory over #8 BYU in a historic matchup. The season ended with a 37–34 loss to Liberty in the Cure Bowl. Following the 2020 regular season, Chadwell was named the winner of the 2020 AP College Coach of the Year Award; the first time a coach from the Sun Belt Conference won the award, and just the third coach from outside the Power Five conferences to do so.

On February 14, 2021, it was revealed that Chadwell more than doubled his salary with a new agreement he signed in December 2020. His base salary was $850,000 for the 2021 season and included a $50,000 increase every year until the contract was scheduled to end on December 31, 2027. Chadwell's increased pay made him the second-highest paid coach in the Sun Belt Conference. In the 2021 season, Chadwell led the team to a 10–2 regular season mark. The Chanticleers won the Cure Bowl over Northern Illinois 47–41.

In the 2022 season, Chadwell led the team to a 9–3 regular season record. The season ended with a 53–29 loss to East Carolina in the Birmingham Bowl.

=== Liberty ===
On December 4, 2022, Chadwell was introduced as the 10th head coach in Liberty history. Chadwell led Liberty to an undefeated regular season in 2023. He led Liberty to a 49–35 victory over New Mexico State in the Conference USA Championship. The Flames' season ended with a 45–6 loss to Oregon in the Fiesta Bowl.

In the 2024 season, Chadwell led the Flames to a 8–3 mark in the regular season. The Flames lost to Buffalo 26–7 in the Bahamas Bowl. In the 2025 season, he led the team to a 4–8 record. In a four-game losing streak to end the season, Liberty lost each game by one possession.

== Personal life ==
Chadwell is a Christian. He is married to the former Solmaz Zarrineh. The couple has a son and two daughters.

== Head coaching record ==
Year	Team	Overall	Conference	Standing	Bowl/playoffs	Coaches^{#}	AP/STATS^{°}
North Greenville Crusaders (NCAA Division II independent) (2009–2011)
2009	North Greenville	2–8					
2010	North Greenville	8–3			W Victory		
2011	North Greenville	11–3			L NCAA Division II Quarterfinal	12	
North Greenville:		21–14					
Delta State Statesmen (Gulf South Conference) (2012)
2012	Delta State	3–7	1–4	T–5th			
Delta State:		3–7	1–4				
Charleston Southern Buccaneers (Big South Conference) (2013–2016)
2013	Charleston Southern	10–3	3–2	3rd		22	24
2014	Charleston Southern	8–4	3–2	T–3rd			
2015	Charleston Southern	10–3	6–0	1st	L NCAA Division I Quarterfinal	7	6
2016	Charleston Southern	7–4	4–1	T–1st	L NCAA Division I First Round	14	15
Charleston Southern:		35–14	16–5				
Coastal Carolina Chanticleers (Sun Belt Conference) (2017)
2017	Coastal Carolina	3–9	2–6	T–10th			
Coastal Carolina Chanticleers (Sun Belt Conference) (2019–2022)
2019	Coastal Carolina	5–7	2–6	5th (East)			
2020	Coastal Carolina	11–1	8–0	1st (East)	L Cure	14	14
2021	Coastal Carolina	11–2	6–2	T–2nd (East)	W Cure		
2022	Coastal Carolina	9–3	6–2	T–1st (East)	Birmingham (Note: Chadwell departed for Liberty prior to the bowl game.)		
Coastal Carolina:		39–22	24–16				
Liberty Flames (Conference USA) (2023–present)
2023	Liberty	13–1	8–0	1st	L Fiesta^{†}		25
2024	Liberty	8–4	5–3	4th	L Bahamas		
2025	Liberty	4–8	3–5	8th			
2026	Liberty	10–1	7–0				
Liberty:		35–14	23–8				
Total:		133–71					
National championship Conference title Conference division title or championship game berth
^{†}Indicates Bowl Coalition, Bowl Alliance, BCS, or CFP / New Years' Six bowl.; ^{#}Rankings from final Coaches Poll.; ^{°}Rankings from final AP Poll.
