= Khalan Laborn =

American gridiron football player (born 1999)

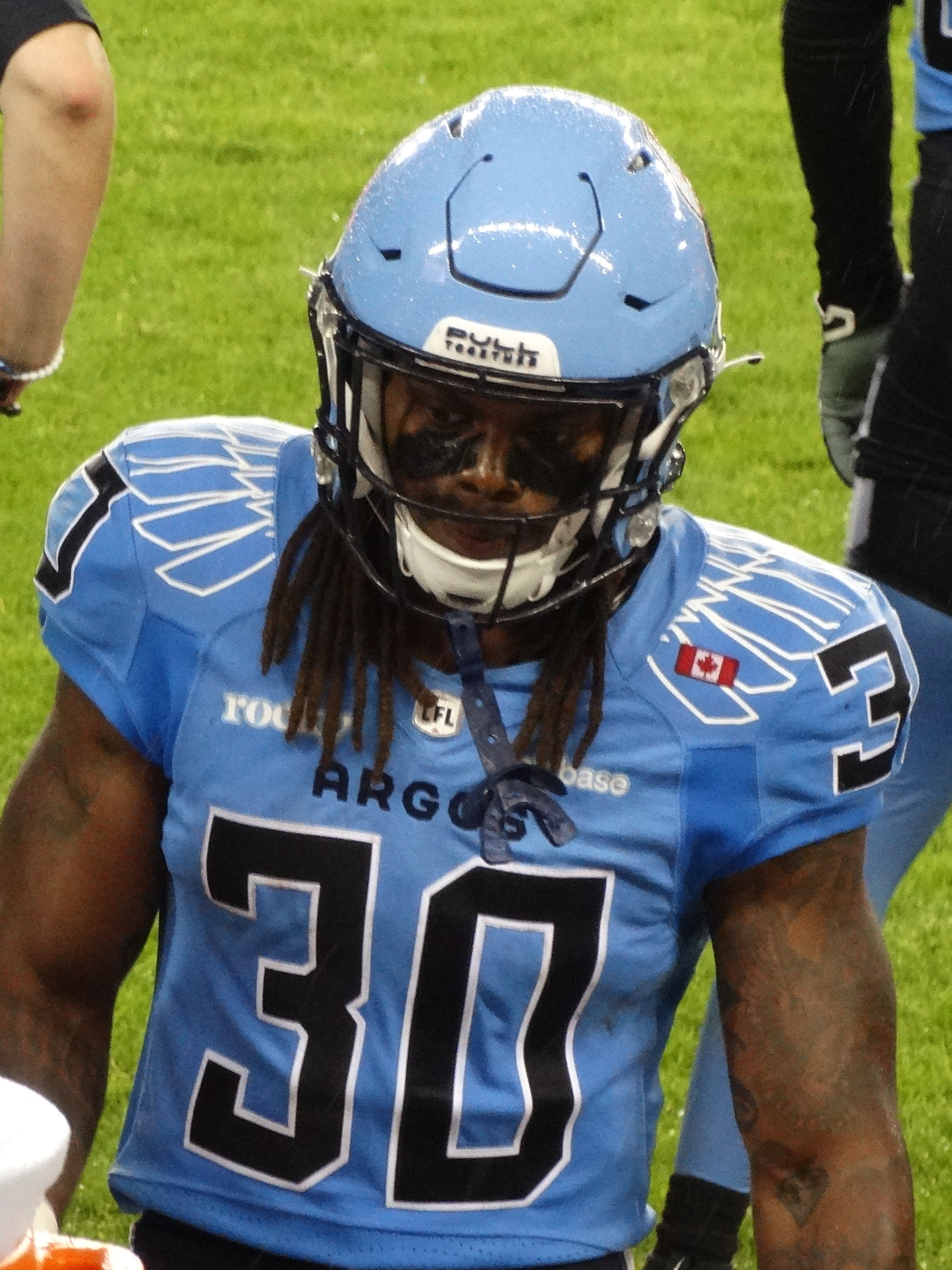
- Laborn with the Toronto Argonauts in 2025

Profile
- Position: Running back

Personal information
- Born: June 1, 1999 (age 27); Virginia Beach, Virginia, U.S.
- Listed height: 5 ft 9 in (1.75 m)
- Listed weight: 204 lb (93 kg)

Career information
- High school: Bishop Sullivan (Virginia Beach, Virginia)
- College: Florida State (2018–2020); Marshall (2022)
- NFL draft: 2023: undrafted

Career history
- San Francisco 49ers (2023)*; Edmonton Elks (2023); Toronto Argonauts (2024)*; Ottawa Redblacks (2024); Saskatchewan Roughriders (2025)*; Toronto Argonauts (2025)
- * Offseason or practice squad member only

Awards and highlights
- First team All-Sun Belt (2022)
- Stats at Pro Football Reference
- Stats at CFL.ca

Khalan Laborn (born June 1, 1999) is an American professional football running back. He most recently played for the Toronto Argonauts of the Canadian Football League (CFL). He played college football at Florida State and Marshall.

== Early life ==
Laborn played high school football at Bishop Sullivan Catholic High School in Virginia Beach, Virginia. He was a five-star recruit in the 2017 college football recruiting class, rated as the No. 1 all-purpose back in the country by 247Sports and Rivals.com.

== College football ==
=== Florida State ===
Laborn enrolled at Florida State University in 2017 and redshirted that fall. He sustained a season-ending knee injury in the second game of the 2018 season. As a redshirt sophomore in 2019, he rushed for 297 yards on 63 carries. He also tallied 10 receptions for 66 yards. He was dismissed from the Florida State program in 2020 for a violation of team rules. He returned to Florida State to complete his degree without playing football.

=== Marshall ===
With college-football eligibility remaining, Laborn enrolled at Marshall in the fall of 2022. He has rushed for over 100 yards in every game during the 2022 season: 102 rushing yards against Norfolk State; 163 yards in Marshall's upset victory over No. 8 Notre Dame; 157 yards against Bowling Green; 113 yards against Troy; 191 yards against Gardner-Webb; 120 yards against Louisiana; and 150 yards against James Madison. Through games played on November 19, 2022, he ranked tenth nationally with 1,323 rushing yards.

== Professional career ==
Pre-draft measurables
Height	Weight	Arm length	Hand span	40-yard dash	10-yard split	20-yard split	20-yard shuttle	Three-cone drill	Vertical jump	Broad jump	Bench press
5 ft 8 5/8 in (1.74 m)	204 lb (93 kg)	30 in (0.76 m)	9 5/8 in (0.24 m)	4.44 s	1.56 s	2.54 s	4.40 s	6.92 s	38.5 in (0.98 m)	10 ft 5 in (3.18 m)	23 reps
All values from Pro Day

=== San Francisco 49ers ===
Laborn was signed by the San Francisco 49ers as an undrafted free agent on May 1, 2023. He was waived on August 19, 2023.

=== Edmonton Elks ===
On September 6, 2023, it was announced that Laborn had signed with the Edmonton Elks. He was released on October 18, 2023.

=== Toronto Argonauts (first stint) ===
On February 15, 2024, Laborn signed with the Toronto Argonauts. He was part of the final training camp cuts on June 1, 2024.

=== Ottawa Redblacks ===
On August 11, 2024, Laborn was signed to the Ottawa Redblacks' practice roster. He was elevated to the game roster on September 6, 2024 for a game against the Toronto Argonauts following the release of starting running back Ryquell Armstead. He finished the year on the practice roster and therefore became a free agent on the day after the Redblacks' season ended, on November 3, 2024.

=== Saskatchewan Roughriders ===
On February 12, 2025, it was announced that Laborn had signed with the Saskatchewan Roughriders. However, we was released near the starting of training camp on May 14, 2025.

=== Toronto Argonauts (second stint) ===
On July 2, 2025, Laborn signed with the Toronto Argonauts. He played in five games for the Argonauts in 2025 where he had 18 carries for 58 yards and one touchdown and five receptions for 36 yards. He was later released on August 11, 2025.
