= Jared Brown (wide receiver) =

American football player (born 2003)

No. 14 – South Carolina Gamecocks
- Position: Wide receiver
- Class: Redshirt Senior

Personal information
- Born: May 1, 2003 (age 23)
- Listed height: 5 ft 11 in (1.80 m)
- Listed weight: 193 lb (88 kg)

Career information
- High school: Parkview (Lilburn, Georgia)
- College: Coastal Carolina (2021–2023); South Carolina (2024–2025)

Awards and highlights
- Sun Belt Freshman Player of the Year (2022)
- Stats at ESPN

Jared Brown (born May 1, 2003) is an American college football wide receiver for the South Carolina Gamecocks. He previously played for the Coastal Carolina Chanticleers.

== Early life ==
Brown attended Parkview High School in Lilburn, Georgia. He was rated as a three-star recruit and committed to play college football for the Coastal Carolina Chanticleers.

== College career ==
=== Coastal Carolina ===
After taking a redshirt season in 2021, Brown totaled 49 receptions for 789 yards and six touchdowns in the 2022 season, earning FWAA Freshman All-American honors. In 2023, he notched 58 catches for 740 yards and four touchdowns, while rushing 15 times for 252 yards and a score. After the season, Brown entered his name into the NCAA transfer portal.

Brown finished his time as a Chanticleer hauling in 108 catches for 1,534 yards and 11 touchdowns, while also adding 35 carries for 439 yards and two more scores on the ground.

=== South Carolina ===
Brown transferred to play for the South Carolina Gamecocks.

During the 2024 season, he played in nine games and started three of them. He finished the season with 15 caught passes for 244 yards, 16.3 yards per catch, one touchdown and six rushes for 40 yards.

== Professional career ==
Pre-draft measurables
Height	Weight	Arm length	Hand span	Wingspan	40-yard dash	10-yard split	20-yard split	20-yard shuttle	Three-cone drill	Vertical jump	Broad jump	Bench press
5 ft 10 5/8 in (1.79 m)	193 lb (88 kg)	30 3/8 in (0.77 m)	9 1/4 in (0.23 m)	6 ft 1 3/4 in (1.87 m)	4.52 s	1.50 s	2.62 s	4.31 s	7.10 s	34.5 in (0.88 m)	10 ft 1 in (3.07 m)	12 reps
All values from Pro Day
