= List of Marshall Thundering Herd bowl games =

The Marshall Thundering Herd college football team competes as part of the National Collegiate Athletic Association (NCAA) Division I Football Bowl Subdivision (FBS), representing Marshall University in the East Division of the Sun Belt Conference (SBC). Since the establishment of the team in 1895, Marshall has appeared in 20 bowl games (officially 19). They have accrued a record of 13–7 (officially 13–6) in their 20 bowl appearances. Their latest bowl win was a victory in the 2022 Myrtle Beach Bowl. Their most recent bowl appearance was a loss in the 2023 Frisco Bowl.

In addition to the below listed bowl games, Marshall withdrew from the 2024 Independence Bowl following a large number of players entering the NCAA transfer portal.

== Bowl games ==
General
†	Bowl game record attendance
‡	Former bowl game record attendance

Results
W	Win
L	Loss

List of bowl games showing bowl played in, score, date, season, opponent, stadium, location, attendance, head coach and MVP (Note: Statistics correct as of 2022–23 NCAA football bowl games.)
#	Bowl	Score (Note: Results are sortable first by whether the result was a Marshall win, loss or tie and then second by the margin of victory.)	Date	Season (Note: Links to the season article for the Marshall team that competed in the bowl for that year.)	Opponent (Note: Links to the season article for the opponent that Marshall competed against in the bowl for that year when available or to their general page when unavailable.)	Stadium	Location	Attendance	Head coach	MVP
1	Tangerine Bowl (Note: The Tangerine Bowl was unsanctioned by the NCAA until 1968. As such, the 1948 appearance in the game is not included in the official NCAA bowl listing for Marshall.)	L 0–7	January 1, 1948	1947	Catawba Indians	Tangerine Bowl	Orlando	9,000	Cam Henderson	Don Gibson (End)
2	Motor City Bowl	L 31–34	December 26, 1997	1997	Ole Miss Rebels	Silverdome	Pontiac	43,340^{‡}	Bob Pruett	–
3	Motor City Bowl	W 48–29	December 23, 1998	1998	Louisville Cardinals	Silverdome	Pontiac	38,016	Bob Pruett	Chad Pennington (QB)
4	Motor City Bowl	W 21–3	December 27, 1999	1999	BYU Cougars	Silverdome	Pontiac	52,449^{‡}	Bob Pruett	Doug Chapman (RB)
5	Motor City Bowl	W 25–14	December 27, 2000	2000	Cincinnati Bearcats	Silverdome	Pontiac	52,911^{‡}	Bob Pruett	Byron Leftwich (QB)
6	GMAC Bowl	W 64–61	December 19, 2001	2001	East Carolina Pirates	Ladd–Peebles Stadium	Mobile	40,139	Bob Pruett	Byron Leftwich (QB)
7	GMAC Bowl	W 38–15	December 18, 2002	2002	Louisville Cardinals	Ladd–Peebles Stadium	Mobile	40,646^{†}	Bob Pruett	Byron Leftwich (QB)
8	Fort Worth Bowl	L 14–32	December 23, 2004	2004	Cincinnati Bearcats	Amon G. Carter Stadium	Fort Worth	27,902	Bob Pruett	–
9	Little Caesars Pizza Bowl	W 21–17	December 26, 2009	2009	Ohio Bobcats	Ford Field	Detroit	30,331	Rick Minter	Martin Ward (RB)
10	Beef 'O' Brady's Bowl	W 20–10	December 20, 2011	2011	FIU Panthers	Tropicana Field	St. Petersburg	20,072	Doc Holliday	Aaron Dobson (WR)
11	Military Bowl	W 31–20	December 27, 2013	2013	Maryland Terrapins	Navy–Marine Corps Memorial Stadium	Annapolis	30,163	Doc Holliday	Rakeem Cato (QB)
12	Boca Raton Bowl	W 52–23	December 23, 2014	2014	Northern Illinois Huskies	FAU Stadium	Boca Raton	29,419^{†}	Doc Holliday	Rakeem Cato (QB)
13	St. Petersburg Bowl	W 16–10	December 26, 2015	2015	Connecticut Huskies	Tropicana Field	St. Petersburg	14,652	Doc Holliday	Deandre Reaves (WR)
14	New Mexico Bowl	W 31–28	December 16, 2017	2017	Colorado State Rams	Dreamstyle Stadium	Albuquerque	26,087	Doc Holliday	Tyre Brady (WR); Channing Hames (DL)
15	Gasparilla Bowl	W 38–20	December 20, 2018	2018	South Florida Bulls	Raymond James Stadium	Tampa	14,135	Doc Holliday	Keion Davis (RB)
16	Gasparilla Bowl	L 25–48	December 23, 2019	2019	UCF Knights	Raymond James Stadium	Tampa	28,987	Doc Holliday	–
17	Camellia Bowl	L 10–17	December 25, 2020	2020	Buffalo Bulls	Cramton Bowl	Montgomery	2,512	Doc Holliday	–
18	New Orleans Bowl	L 21–36	December 18, 2021	2021	Louisiana Ragin' Cajuns	Caesars Superdome	New Orleans	21,642	Charles Huff	–
19	Myrtle Beach Bowl	W 28–14	December 19, 2022	2022	Connecticut Huskies	Brooks Stadium	Conway	12,023^{†}	Charles Huff	Rasheen Ali (RB)
20	Frisco Bowl	L 17–35	December 19, 2023	2023	UTSA Roadrunners	Toyota Stadium	Frisco	11,215	Charles Huff	–
