= 2018 Gasparilla Bowl =

College football bowl game

2018 Bad Boy Mowers Gasparilla Bowl
- 11th Gasparilla Bowl
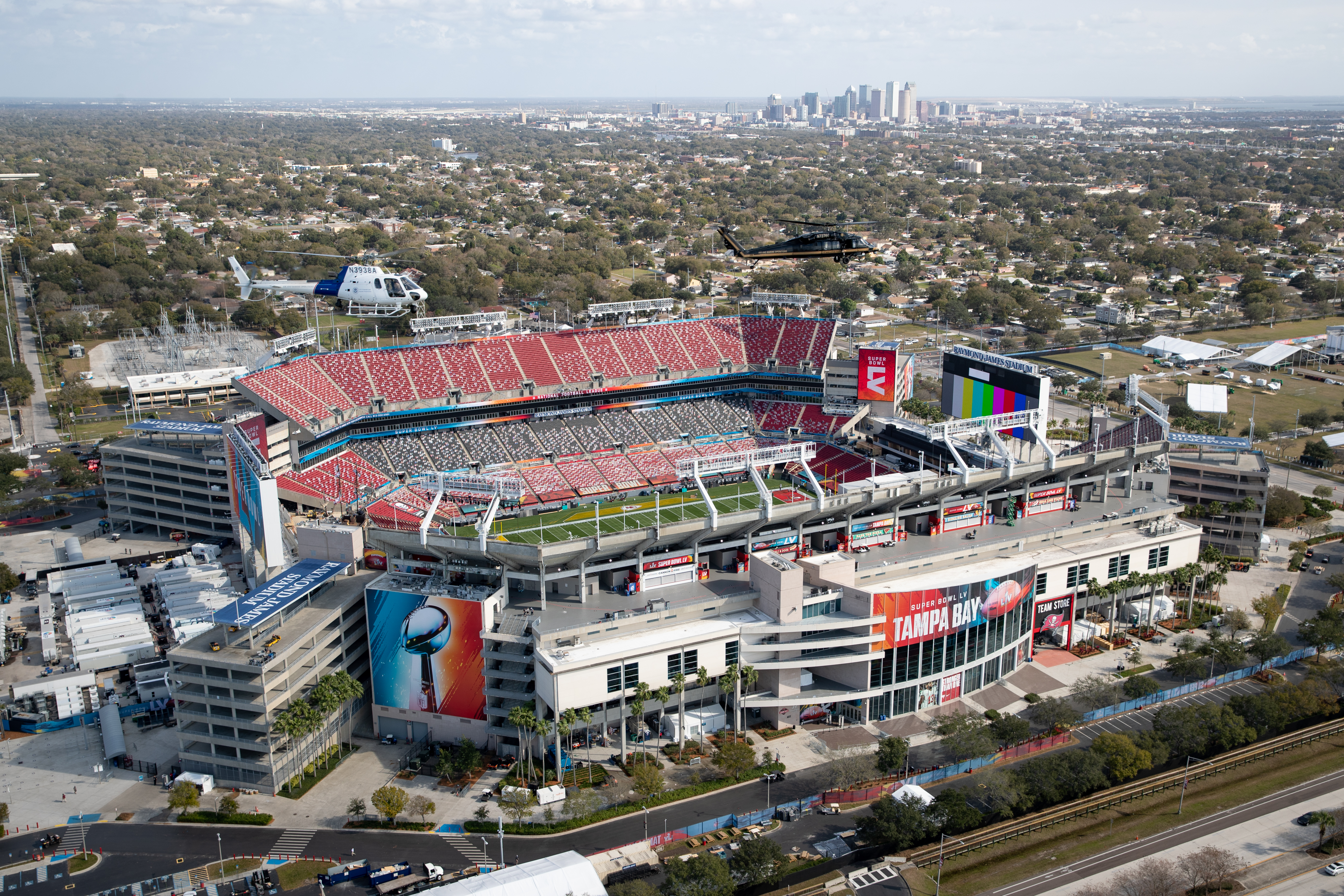
- Raymond James Stadium in Tampa, Florida, hosted the Gasparilla Bowl.
Marshall Thundering Herd	South Florida Bulls
(8–4)	(7–5)
C-USA	The American
38	20
Head coach: Doc Holliday	Head coach: Charlie Strong
	1	2	3	4	Total
Marshall	21	7	3	7	38
South Florida	7	3	10	0	20
- Date: December 20, 2018
- Season: 2018
- Stadium: Raymond James Stadium
- Location: Tampa, Florida
- MVP: Keion Davis (RB, Marshall)
- Favorite: Marshall by 2.5
- Referee: Steve Baron (Mountain West)
- Attendance: 14,135
- Payout: US$1,134,000

United States TV coverage
- Network: ESPN and Gameday Radio
- Announcers: Clay Matvick, Dan Orlovsky and Paul Carcaterra (ESPN); Dave Weekley, Brad Howe, and Travis Jones (Gameday Radio)

International TV coverage
- Network: ESPN Deportes

The 2018 Gasparilla Bowl was a college football bowl game played on December 20, 2018, with kickoff scheduled for 8:00 p.m. EST. It was the 11th edition of the game originally known as the St. Petersburg Bowl and renamed before its 2017 playing as the Gasparilla Bowl, and one of the 2018–19 bowl games concluding the 2018 FBS football season. Sponsored by lawn mower manufacturing company Bad Boy Mowers, the game was officially known as the Bad Boy Mowers Gasparilla Bowl.

This was the first time for the bowl to be played at Raymond James Stadium in Tampa, as the prior 10 editions of the bowl were held at Tropicana Field in nearby St. Petersburg.

== Teams ==
The game featured the Marshall Thundering Herd of Conference USA (C-USA) against the South Florida Bulls of the American Athletic Conference (AAC) in their first meeting against each other.

=== Marshall Thundering Herd ===
Marshall received and accepted a bid to the Gasparilla Bowl on December 2. The Thundering Herd entered the bowl with an 8–4 record (6–2 C-USA). The game was the team's 15th overall bowl appearance and third appearance in the Gasparilla Bowl. The Herd previously played in the 2011 edition and 2015 edition, winning against FIU and Connecticut, respectively.

=== South Florida Bulls ===
South Florida received and accepted a bid to the Gasparilla Bowl on December 2. The Bulls entered the bowl with a 7–5 record (3–5 AAC), having lost their final five regular season games. The game was the team's 10th overall bowl appearance and second appearance in the Gasparilla Bowl. The Bulls previously played in the 2008 edition, winning against Memphis.

== Game summary ==
=== Scoring summary ===
Scoring summary

Quarter	Time	Drive			Team	Scoring information	Score	
Quarter	Time	Plays	Yards	TOP	Team	Scoring information	MRSH	USF
1	5:20	7	81	3:41	MRSH	Isaiah Green 10-yard touchdown run, Justin Rohrwasser kick good	7	0
1	4:43	1	1	0:05	MRSH	Artis Johnson 1-yard touchdown run, Justin Rohrwasser kick good	14	0
1	2:43	6	75	2:00	USF	Randall St. Felix 38-yard touchdown reception from Tyre McCants, Coby Weiss kick good	14	7
1	0:25	5	80	2:18	MRSH	Brenden Knox 8-yard touchdown run, Justin Rohrwasser kick good	21	7
2	1:30	3	17	1:10	MRSH	Keion Davis 5-yard touchdown run, Justin Rohrwasser kick good	28	7
2	0:04	10	69	1:26	USF	22-yard field goal by Coby Weiss	28	10
3	9:13	14	61	5:47	USF	31-yard field goal by Coby Weiss	28	13
3	5:19	9	54	3:54	MRSH	28-yard field goal by Justin Rohrwasser	31	13
3	3:16	4	72	2:03	USF	Randall St. Felix 33-yard touchdown reception from Blake Barnett, Coby Weiss kick good	31	20
4	6:24	11	64	5:47	MRSH	Keion Davis 16-yard touchdown run, Justin Rohrwasser kick good	38	20
"TOP" = time of possession. For other American football terms, see Glossary of American football.							38	20

=== Statistics ===
	1	2	3	4	Total
Thundering Herd	21	7	3	7	38
Bulls	7	3	10	0	20

Statistics	MRSH	USF
First downs	24	19
Plays–yards	70–503	66–360
Rushes–yards	44–282	35–92
Passing yards	221	268
Passing: comp–att–int	17–26–0	15–31–0
Time of possession	36:14	23:46

Team	Category	Player	Statistics
Marshall	Passing	Isaiah Green	17/25, 221 yds
Marshall	Rushing	Keion Davis	14 car, 94 yds, 2 TD
Marshall	Receiving	Tyre Brady	5 rec, 88 yds
South Florida	Passing	Blake Barnett	11/23, 212 yds, 1 TD
South Florida	Rushing	Johnny Ford	11 car, 50 yds
South Florida	Receiving	Randall St. Felix	6 rec, 165 yds, 2 TD
