= 2022 UConn Huskies football team =

American college football season

2022 UConn Huskies football

Myrtle Beach Bowl, L 14–28 vs. Marshall
- Conference: Independent
- Record: 6–7
- Head coach: Jim L. Mora (1st season)
- Offensive coordinator: Nick Charlton (1st season)
- Offensive scheme: Multiple
- Base defense: 4–3
- Home stadium: Rentschler Field

2022 NCAA Division I FBS independents football records
	Conf.			Overall
Team	W		L	W		L
No. 18 Notre Dame		–		9	–	4
Liberty		–		8	–	5
BYU		–		8	–	5
New Mexico State		–		7	–	6
Army		–		6	–	6
UConn		–		6	–	7
UMass		–		1	–	11
Rankings from AP Poll

The 2022 UConn Huskies football team represented the University of Connecticut (UConn) an independent during the 2022 NCAA Division I FBS football season. Led by first-year head coach Jim L. Mora, the Huskies compiled a record of 6–7. Connecticut was invited to the Myrtle Beach Bowl, where the Huskies lost to Marshall. The team played home games at Pratt & Whitney Stadium at Rentschler Field in East Hartford, Connecticut.

Mora was hired as UConn's head coach in November 2021. On November 12, 2022, the Huskies defeated the Liberty Flames to become bowl eligible for the first time since the 2015 season.

== Schedule ==
UConn's schedule consisted of six home games and six away games for the season.

Date	Time	Opponent	Site	TV	Result	Attendance
August 27	4:00 p.m.	at Utah State	Maverik Stadium; Logan, UT	FS1	L 20–31	19,553
September 3	12:00 p.m.	Central Connecticut	Pratt & Whitney Stadium at Rentschler Field; East Hartford, CT	CW20, FOX61+	W 28–3	22,442
September 10	7:00 p.m.	Syracuse	Pratt & Whitney Stadium at Rentschler Field; East Hartford, CT (rivalry)	CBSSN	L 14–48	25,114
September 17	12:00 p.m.	at No. 4 Michigan	Michigan Stadium; Ann Arbor, MI	ABC	L 0–59	109,639
September 24	7:30 p.m.	at No. 12 NC State	Carter–Finley Stadium; Raleigh, NC	ACC RSN	L 10–41	56,919
October 1	3:30 p.m.	Fresno State	Pratt & Whitney Stadium at Rentschler Field; East Hartford, CT	CBSSN	W 19–14	20,952
October 8	7:00 p.m.	at FIU	Riccardo Silva Stadium; Westchester, FL	ESPN3	W 33–12	16,689
October 15	2:00 p.m.	at Ball State	Scheumann Stadium; Muncie, IN	ESPN3	L 21–25	10,006
October 29	12:00 p.m.	Boston College^{†}	Rentschler Field; Pratt & Whitney Stadium at Rentschler Field	CBSSN	W 13–3	25,527
November 4	7:00 p.m.	UMass	Rentschler Field; East Hartford, CT (rivalry)	CBSSN	W 27–10	23,430
November 12	12:00 p.m.	Liberty	Rentschler Field; Pratt & Whitney Stadium at Rentschler Field	CBSSN	W 36–33	15,107
November 19	12:00 p.m.	at Army	Michie Stadium; West Point, NY	CBSSN	L 17–34	31,229
December 19	2:30 p.m.	vs. Marshall	Brooks Stadium; Conway, SC (Myrtle Beach Bowl)	ESPN	L 14–28	12,023
^{†}Homecoming; Rankings from AP Poll (and CFP Rankings, after November 1) - Released prior to game; All times are in Eastern time

== Game summaries ==
=== At Utah State ===
UConn Huskies at Utah State Aggies – Game summary

Quarter	1	2	3	4	Total
Huskies	14	0	0	6	20
Aggies	0	24	0	7	31

at Maverik Stadium • Logan, Utah

- Date: August 27
- Game time: 4:05 p.m.
- Game weather: Temperature: 87 °F (31 °C) • Wind: 14 SW • Weather: Sunny
- Game attendance: 19,553
- Referee: Derek Anderson
- TV announcers (FS1): Alex Faust (play-by-play) and Petros Papadakis (color analyst)
- Box Score

Game information

First quarter

- CONN – Ta'Quan Roberson 1 yd run (Noe Ruelas kick), 10:05. Huskies 7–0. Drive: 9 plays, 79 yards, TOP 03:05
- CONN – Keelan Marion 13 yd pass from Zion Turner (Noe Ruelas kick), 1:38. Huskies 14–0. Drive: 4 plays, 79 yards, TOP 01:48

Second quarter

- USU – Kyle Van Leeuwen 11-yard pass from Logan Bonner (Connor Coles kick), 12:28. Huskies 14–7. Drive: 5 plays, 45 yards, TOP 01:40
- USU – Robert Briggs 23-yard run (Connor Coles kick), 3:42. Tied 14–14. Drive: 7 plays, 86 yards, TOP 02:53
- USU – Justin McGriff 14-yard pass from Logan Bonner (Connor Coles kick), 1:48. Aggies 21–14. Drive: 4 plays, 67 yards, TOP 00:53
- USU – Connor Coles 45-yard field goal, 0:01. Aggies 24–14. Drive: 6 plays, 19 yards, TOP 00:51

Fourth quarter

- CONN – Noe Ruelas 47-yard field goal, 13:28. Aggies 24–17. Drive: 9 plays, 46 yards, TOP 04:37
- CONN – Noe Ruelas 54-yard field goal, 10:09. Aggies 24–20. Drive: 6 plays, 16 yards, TOP 01:51
- USU – Brian Cobbs 11-yard pass from Logan Bonner (Connor Coles kick), 6:00. Aggies 31–20. Drive: 13 plays, 75 yards, TOP 04:09

Top passers

- CONN – Zion Turner – 12/31, 109 yards, 1 TD
- USU – Logan Bonner – 20/29, 281 yards, 3 TD

Top rushers

- CONN – Nate Carter – 20 rushes, 190 yards
- USU – Calvin Tyler Jr. – 33 rushes, 161 yards

Top receivers

- CONN – Aaron Turner – 3 receptions, 32 yards
- USU – Brian Cobbs – 7 receptions, 78 yards, 1 TD

Top defense

- CONN – Jackson Mitchell – 16 tackles
- USU – MJ Tafisi – 10 tackles

Statistics	UConn	USU
First downs	21	31
Total yards	364	542
Rushing yards	245	261
Passing yards	119	281
Turnovers	3	2
Time of possession	28:17	31:43

=== Central Connecticut ===
Central Connecticut Blue Devils at UConn Huskies – Game summary

Quarter	1	2	3	4	Total
Blue Devils	0	3	0	0	3
Huskies	0	7	7	14	28

at Pratt & Whitney Stadium at Rentschler Field • East Hartford, Connecticut

- Date: September 3
- Game time: 12:05 p.m.
- Game weather: Temperature: 78 °F (26 °C) • Wind: 2 S • Weather: Sunny
- Game attendance: 22,442
- Referee: Stuart Mullins
- TV announcers (CW20): John Fanta (play-by-play), Joe D’Ambrosio (color analyst) and Randy Brochu (sideline)
- Box Score

Game information

Second quarter

- CCSU – Cristiano Rosa 28-yard field goal, 11:32. Blue Devils 3–0. Drive: 6 plays, 30 yards, TOP 01:57
- CONN – Brandon Niemenski 11 yd pass from Zion Turner (Noe Ruelas kick), 6:02. Huskies 7–3. Drive: 11 plays, 80 yards, TOP 05:24

Third quarter

- CONN – Nate Carter 17 yd run (Noe Ruelas kick), 2:55. Huskies 14–3. Drive: 14 plays, 80 yards, TOP 06:10

Fourth quarter

- CONN – Jacob Flynn 10 yd pass from Zion Turner (Noe Ruelas kick), 11:19. Huskies 21–3. Drive: 8 plays, 60 yards, TOP 03:35
- CONN – Victor Rosa 11 yd run (Noe Ruelas kick), 0:36. Huskies 28–3. Drive: 14 plays, 88 yards, TOP 08:25

Top passers

- CONN – Zion Turner – 14/22, 172 yards, 2 TDs
- CCSU – Romelo Williams – 16/30, 164 yards

Top rushers

- CONN – Nate Carter – 23 rushes, 123 yards, 1 TD
- CCSU – Malik Thomas – 5 rushes, 63 yards

Top receivers

- CONN – Aaron Turner – 2 receptions, 57 yards
- CCSU – Kyren Petteway – 6 receptions, 61 yards

Top defense

- CONN – Jackson Mitchell – 7 tackles
- CCSU – Anthony Wynn – 12 tackles

Statistics	UConn	CCSU
First downs	27	14
Total yards	446	242
Rushing yards	274	78
Passing yards	172	164
Turnovers	3	1
Time of possession	34:38	25:22

=== Syracuse ===
Syracuse Orange at UConn Huskies – Game summary

Quarter	1	2	3	4	Total
Orange	17	10	14	7	48
Huskies	0	7	7	0	14

at Pratt & Whitney Stadium at Rentschler Field • East Hartford, Connecticut

- Date: September 10
- Game time: 7:03 p.m.
- Game weather: Temperature: 84 °F (29 °C) • Wind: 2 N • Weather: Sunny
- Game attendance: 25,114
- Referee: Mike Roche
- TV announcers (CBSSN): Meghan McPeak (play-by-play), Christian Fauria (color analyst) and Justin Walters (sideline)
- Box Score

Game information

First quarter

- SYR – Garrett Shrader 1 yd run (Andre Szmyt kick), 10:04. Orange 7–0. Drive: 12 plays, 69 yards, TOP 04:52
- SYR – Andre Szmyt 27-yard field goal, 4:26. Orange 10–0. Drive: 9 plays, 42 yards, TOP 03:29
- SYR – Damien Alford 47 yd pass from Garrett Shrader (Andre Szmyt kick), 1:47. Orange 17–0. Drive: 4 plays, 61 yards, TOP 01:38

Second quarter

- CONN – Devontae Houston 28 yd run (Noe Ruelas kick), 11:45. Orange 17–7. Drive: 9 plays, 79 yards, TOP 05:02
- SYR – Andre Szmyt 28-yard field goal, 5:02. Orange 20–7. Drive: 12 plays, 63 yards, TOP 06:37
- SYR – Courtney Jackson 18 yd pass from Garrett Shrader (Andre Szmyt kick), 0:19. Orange 27–7. Drive: 10 plays, 64 yards, TOP 03:19

Third quarter

- SYR – Sean Tucker 2 yd run (Andre Szmyt kick), 9:30. Orange 34–7. Drive: 6 plays, 30 yards, TOP 02:58
- CONN – Aaron Turner 56 yd pass from Zion Turner (Noe Ruelas kick), 6:26. Orange 34–14. Drive: 6 plays, 75 yards, TOP 03:04
- SYR – Garrett Shrader 7 yd run (Andre Szmyt kick), 2:29. Orange 41–14. Drive: 8 plays, 75 yards, TOP 03:57

Fourth quarter

- SYR – D'Marcus Adams 39 yd pass from Garrett Shrader (Andre Szmyt kick), 14:07. Orange 48–14. Drive: 1 plays, 39 yards, TOP 00:06

Top passers

- CONN – Zion Turner – 14/17, 92 yards, 1 TD
- SYR – Garrett Shrader – 20/23, 287 yards, 3 TDs

Top rushers

- CONN – Nate Carter – 16 rushes, 71 yards
- SYR – Sean Tucker – 27 rushes, 112 yards, 1 TD

Top receivers

- CONN – Aaron Turner – 6 receptions, 71 yards, 1 TD
- SYR – Damien Alford – 1 receptions, 47 yards, 1 TD

Top defense

- CONN – Jackson Mitchell – 16 tackles
- SYR – Garrett Williams – 7 tackles

Statistics	UConn	SYR
First downs	10	29
Total yards	202	465
Rushing yards	97	156
Passing yards	105	309
Turnovers	2	0
Time of possession	25:08	34:52

=== At No. 4 Michigan ===
UConn Huskies at Michigan Wolverines – Game summary

Quarter	1	2	3	4	Total
Huskies	0	0	0	0	0
No. 4 Wolverines	17	21	7	14	59

at Michigan Stadium • Ann Arbor, Michigan

- Date: September 17
- Game time: 12:07 p.m.
- Game weather: Temperature: 75 °F (24 °C) • Wind: 8 SW • Weather: Sunny
- Game attendance: 109,639
- Referee: Tom Stapleton
- TV announcers (ABC): Bob Wischusen (play-by-play), Roddy Jones (color analyst) and Kris Budden (sideline)
- Box Score

Game information

First quarter

- UM – Blake Corum 20 yd run (Jake Moody kick), 12:52. Wolverines 7–0. Drive: 4 plays, 72 yards, TOP 02:01
- UM – Blake Corum 1 yd run (Jake Moody kick), 2:52. Wolverines 14–0. Drive: 8 plays, 54 yards, TOP 04:02
- UM – Jake Moody 26-yard field goal, 0:38. Wolverines 17–0. Drive: 5 plays, 15 yards, TOP 01:31

Second quarter

- UM – Blake Corum 1 yd run (Jake Moody kick), 12:08. Wolverines 24–0. Drive: 3 plays, 18 yards, TOP 00:56
- UM – A. J. Henning 61 yd punt return (Jake Moody kick), 6:05. Wolverines 31–0.
- UM – Blake Corum 1 yd run (Jake Moody kick), 3:11. Wolverines 38–0. Drive: 3 plays, 60 yards, TOP 01:22

Third quarter

- UM – Blake Corum 11 yd run (Jake Moody kick), 4:36. Wolverines 45–0. Drive: 11 plays, 83 yards, TOP 06:02

Fourth quarter

- UM – Alex Orji 10 yd run (Jake Moody kick), 12:44. Wolverines 52–0. Drive: 11 plays, 66 yards, TOP 04:48
- UM – Leon Franklin 20 yd pass from Alan Bowman (Tommy Doman kick), 7:54. Wolverines 59–0. Drive: 6 plays, 30 yards, TOP 03:11

Top passers

- CONN – Zion Turner – 4/16, 17 yards
- UM – J. J. McCarthy – 15/18, 214 yards

Top rushers

- CONN – Zion Turner – 7 rushes, 42 yards
- UM – Blake Corum – 12 rushes, 71 yards, 5 TDs

Top receivers

- CONN – Nate Carter – 1 reception, 9 yards
- UM – Ronnie Bell – 7 receptions, 96 yards

Top defense

- CONN – Jackson Mitchell – 10 tackles
- UM – Junior Colson – 5 tackles

Statistics	UConn	UM
First downs	6	26
Total yards	110	465
Rushing yards	86	192
Passing yards	24	273
Turnovers	1	0
Time of possession	25:53	34:07

=== At No. 12 NC State ===
UConn Huskies at NC State Wolfpack – Game summary

Quarter	1	2	3	4	Total
Huskies	0	3	0	7	10
No. 12 Wolfpack	17	14	7	3	41

at Carter–Finley Stadium • Raleigh, North Carolina

- Date: September 24
- Game time: 7:33 p.m.
- Game weather: Temperature: 71 °F (22 °C) • Wind: 2 SW • Weather: Cloudy
- Game attendance: 56,919
- Referee: Gary Patterson
- TV announcers (ACC RSN): Evan Lepler (play-by-play), James Bates (color analyst) and Lauren Jbara (sideline)
- Box Score

Game information

First quarter

- NCST – Thayer Thomas 75 yd pass from Devin Leary (Christopher Dunn kick), 14:46. Wolfpack 7–0. Drive: 1 plays, 75 yards, TOP 00:14
- NCST – Demie Sumo-Karngbaye 20 yd run (Christopher Dunn kick), 7:26. Wolfpack 14–0. Drive: 9 plays, 62 yards, TOP 04:19
- NCST – Christopher Dunn 48-yard field goal, 0:51. Wolfpack 17–0. Drive: 11 plays, 40 yards, TOP 04:32

Second quarter

- NCST – Devin Carter 1 yd pass from Devin Leary (Christopher Dunn kick), 9:32. Wolfpack 24–0. Drive: 10 plays, 77 yards, TOP 04:41
- NCST – Keyon Lesane 2 yd pass from Devin Leary (Christopher Dunn kick), 2:53. Wolfpack 31–0. Drive: 11 plays, 71 yards, TOP 05:07
- CONN – Noe Ruelas 28-yard field goal, 0:00. Wolfpack 31–3. Drive: 4 plays, 1 yards, TOP 00:46

Third quarter

- NCST – Porter Rooks 4 yd pass from Devin Leary (Collin Smith kick), 4:17. Wolfpack 38–3. Drive: 8 plays, 52 yards, TOP 03:38

Fourth quarter

- NCST – Collin Smith 40-yard field goal, 13:22. Wolfpack 41–3. Drive: 11 plays, 50 yards, TOP 03:49
- CONN – Victor Rosa 11 yd run (Noe Ruelas kick), 2:08. Wolfpack 41–10. Drive: 10 plays, 70 yards, TOP 04:35

Top passers

- CONN – Zion Turner – 10/12, 39 yards
- NCST – Devin Leary – 32/44, 320 yards, 4 TDs

Top rushers

- CONN – Victor Rosa – 6 rushes, 43 yards, 1 TD
- NCST – Michael Allen – 10 rushes, 66 yards

Top receivers

- CONN – Devontae Houston – 3 receptions, 22 yards
- NCST – Thayer Thomas – 5 receptions, 115 yards, 1 TD

Top defense

- CONN – Durante Jones – 13 tackles
- NCST – Sean Brown – 7 tackles

Statistics	UConn	NCST
First downs	8	29
Total yards	150	492
Rushing yards	121	169
Passing yards	39	323
Turnovers	0	1
Time of possession	24:31	35:29

=== Fresno State ===
Fresno State Bulldogs at UConn Huskies – Game summary

Quarter	1	2	3	4	Total
Bulldogs	0	7	7	0	14
Huskies	3	3	6	7	19

at Pratt & Whitney Stadium at Rentschler Field • East Hartford, Connecticut

- Date: October 1
- Game time: 3:32 p.m.
- Game weather: Temperature: 55 °F (13 °C) • Wind: 11 NE • Weather: Cloudy
- Game attendance: 20,952
- Referee: Stuart Mullins
- TV announcers (CBSSN): Meghan McPeak (play-by-play), Christian Fauria (color analyst) and Justin Walters (sideline)
- Box Score

Game information

First quarter

- CONN – Noe Ruelas 26-yard field goal, 4:06. Huskies 3–0. Drive: 8 plays, 24 yards, TOP 03:15

Second quarter

- FS – Nikko Remigio 87 yd punt return (Abraham Montano kick), 9:33. Bulldogs 7–3.
- CONN – Noe Ruelas 28-yard field goal, 4:51. Bulldogs 7–6. Drive: 9 plays, 76 yards, TOP 04:37

Third quarter

- FS – Jordan Mims 1 yd run (Abraham Montano kick), 12:50. Bulldogs 14–6. Drive: 5 plays, 62 yards, TOP 02:03
- CONN – Aaron Turner 5 yd pass from Zion Turner (2 pt conversion no good), 5:18. Bulldogs 14–12. Drive: 6 plays, 19 yards, TOP 02:43

Fourth quarter

- CONN – Devontae Houston 17 yd run (Noe Ruelas kick), 2:20. Huskies 19–14. Drive: 11 plays, 94 yards, TOP 06:06

Top passers

- CONN – Zion Turner – 8/15, 130 yards, 1 TD
- FS – Logan Fife – 16/22, 157 yards

Top rushers

- CONN – Devontae Houston – 23 rushes, 105 yards, 1 TD
- FS – Jordan Mims – 15 rushes, 39 yards, 1 TD

Top receivers

- CONN – Kevens Clercius – 2 receptions, 79 yards
- FS – Jalen Cropper – 5 receptions, 76 yards

Top defense

- CONN – Malik Dixon-Williams – 8 tackles
- FS – Levelle Bailey – 10 tackles

Statistics	UConn	FS
First downs	20	14
Total yards	313	187
Rushing yards	183	30
Passing yards	130	157
Turnovers	2	3
Time of possession	36:36	23:24

=== At FIU ===
UConn Huskies at FIU Panthers – Game summary

Quarter	1	2	3	4	Total
Huskies	7	13	6	7	33
Panthers	0	0	10	2	12

at Riccardo Silva Stadium • Westchester, Florida

- Date: October 8
- Game time: 7:02 p.m.
- Game weather: Temperature: 82 °F (28 °C) • Weather: Sunny
- Game attendance: 16,689
- Referee: Joe Lehring
- TV announcers (ESPN3): AJ Ricketts (play-by-play), Corey Brooks (color analyst)
- Box Score

Game information

First quarter

- CONN – Victor Rosa 5 yd run (Noe Ruelas kick), 6:34. Huskies 7–0. Drive: 11 plays, 75 yards, TOP 05:22

Second quarter

- CONN – Victor Rosa 4 yd run (Noe Ruelas kick), 13:35. Huskies 14–0. Drive: 11 plays, 64 yards, TOP 05:24
- CONN – Noe Ruelas 26-yard field goal, 1:03. Huskies 17–0. Drive: 12 plays, 87 yards, TOP 04:53
- CONN – Noe Ruelas 35-yard field goal, 0:00. Huskies 20–0. Drive: 2 plays, -10 yards, TOP 00:47

Third quarter

- FIU – Lexington Joseph 47 yd run (Chase Gabriel kick), 11:45. Huskies 20–7. Drive: 5 plays, 65 yards, TOP 02:26
- CONN – Zion Turner 5 yd pass from Cale Millen (2 pt conversion no good), 7:58. Huskies 26–7. Drive: 7 plays, 75 yards, TOP 03:47
- FIU – Chase Gabriel 25-yard field goal, 4:06. Huskies 26–10. Drive: 9 plays, 59 yards, TOP 03:44

Fourth quarter

- FIU – Team Safety, 5:22. Huskies 26–12. Drive: 0 plays, 0 yards, TOP 00:00
- CONN – Cale Millen 49 yd run (Noe Ruelas kick), 2:56. Huskies 33–12. Drive: 3 plays, 50 yards, TOP 00:25

Top passers

- CONN – Zion Turner – 14/19, 102 yards
- FIU – Grayson James – 28/43, 256 yards, 2 INT

Top rushers

- CONN – Devontae Houston – 12 rushes, 135 yards
- FIU – Lexington Joseph – 7 rushes, 103 yards, 1 TD

Top receivers

- CONN – Justin Joly – 5 receptions, 62 yards
- FIU – Jalen Bracey – 9 receptions, 75 yards

Top defense

- CONN – Jackson Mitchell – 9 tackles, 1 fumble recovery
- FIU – Donovan Manuel – 11 tackles, 2.0 tackles for loss

Statistics	UConn	FIU
First downs	20	17
Total yards	402	409
Rushing yards	295	153
Passing yards	107	256
Turnovers	0	3
Time of possession	34:15	25:45

=== At Ball State ===
UConn Huskies at Ball State Cardinals – Game summary

Quarter	1	2	3	4	Total
Huskies	7	14	0	0	21
Cardinals	7	3	3	12	25

at Scheumann Stadium • Muncie, Indiana

- Date: October 15
- Game time: 2:02 p.m.
- Game weather: Temperature: 53 °F (12 °C) • Weather: Sunny
- Game attendance: 10,006
- Referee: Ron Hudson
- TV announcers (ESPN3): Jim Barbar (play-by-play) & Adam Breneman (color analyst)
- Box Score

Game information

First quarter

- CONN – Aaron Turner 19 yd pass from Zion Turner (Noe Ruelas kick), 9:58. Huskies 7–0. Drive: 6 plays, 69 yards, TOP 02:43
- BSU – Carson Steele 1 yd run (Ben VonGunten kick), 0:15. Tied 7–7. Drive: 12 plays, 73 yards, TOP 05:18

Second quarter

- CONN – Justin Joly 39 yd pass from Zion Turner (Noe Ruelas kick), 12:25. Huskies 14–7. Drive: 6 plays, 69 yards, TOP 02:41
- BSU – Ben VonGunten 38-yard field goal, 9:21. Huskies 14–10. Drive: 9 plays, 54 yards, TOP 03:04
- CONN – Robert Burns 1 yd run (Noe Ruelas kick), 0:58. Huskies 21–10. Drive: 9 plays, 64 yards, TOP 01:53

Third quarter

- BSU – Ben VonGunten 38-yard field goal, 10:34. Huskies 21–13. Drive: 10 plays, 29 yards, TOP 03:14

Fourth quarter

- BSU – Carson Steele 2 yd run (2 pt conv no good), 7:24. Huskies 21–19. Drive: 4 plays, 24 yards, TOP 00:41
- BSU – Carson Steele 17 yd run (2 pt conv no good), 2:40. Cardinals 25–21. Drive: 8 plays, 59 yards, TOP 02:35

Top passers

- CONN – Zion Turner – 18/22, 129 yards, 2 TDs
- BSU – John Paddock – 19/39, 147 yards

Top rushers

- CONN – Victor Rosa – 17 rushes, 72 yards
- BSU – Carson Steele – 32 rushes, 179 yards, 3 TDs

Top receivers

- CONN – Aaron Turner – 8 receptions, 56 yards, 1 TD
- BSU – Jayshon Jackson – 8 receptions, 71 yards

Top defense

- CONN – Jackson Mitchell – 13 tackles
- BSU – Jordan Riley – 14 tackles

Statistics	UConn	BSU
First downs	16	22
Total yards	323	356
Rushing yards	194	209
Passing yards	129	147
Turnovers	2	1
Time of possession	30:23	29:37

=== Boston College ===
Boston College Eagles at UConn Huskies – Game summary

Quarter	1	2	3	4	Total
Eagles	0	3	0	0	3
Huskies	10	0	0	3	13

at Pratt & Whitney Stadium at Rentschler Field • East Hartford, Connecticut

- Date: October 29
- Game time: 12:02 p.m.
- Game weather: Temperature: 58 °F (14 °C) • Weather: Sunny
- Game attendance: 25,527
- Referee: Timothy Hedgepeth
- TV announcers (CBSSN): Rich Waltz (play-by-play), Aaron Taylor (color analyst) & Sherree Burruss (sideline)
- Box Score

Game information

First quarter

- CONN – Justin Joly 62 yd pass from Zion Turner (Noe Ruelas kick), 13:55. Huskies 7–0. Drive: 2 plays, 75 yards, TOP 01:05
- CONN – Noe Ruelas 31-yard field goal, 8:42. Huskies 10–0. Drive: 7 plays, 21 yards, TOP 03:21

Second quarter

- BC – Connor Lytton 19-yard field goal, 9:57. Huskies 10–3. Drive: 11 plays, 79 yards, TOP 04:57

Fourth quarter

- CONN – Noe Ruelas 43-yard field goal, 6:26. Huskies 13–3. Drive: 4 plays, 7 yards, TOP 02:09

Top passers

- CONN – Zion Turner – 11/19, 173 yards, 1 TD
- BC – Phil Jurkovec – 12/19, 155 yards

Top rushers

- CONN – Robert Burns – 10 rushes, 39 yards
- BC – Phil Jurkovec – 14 rushes, 29 yards

Top receivers

- CONN – Aaron Turner – 4 receptions, 70 yards
- BC – Patrick Garwo – 5 receptions, 89 yards

Top defense

- CONN – Jackson Mitchell – 12 tackles
- BC – Bryce Steele – 7 tackles

Statistics	UConn	BC
First downs	13	18
Total yards	280	335
Rushing yards	107	76
Passing yards	173	259
Turnovers	0	5
Time of possession	30:47	29:13

=== UMass ===
UMass Minutemen at UConn Huskies – Game summary

Quarter	1	2	3	4	Total
Minutemen	3	7	0	0	10
Huskies	7	6	7	7	27

at Pratt & Whitney Stadium at Rentschler Field • East Hartford, Connecticut

- Date: November 4
- Game time: 7:02 p.m.
- Game weather: Temperature: 61 °F (16 °C) • Weather: Clear
- Game attendance: 23,430
- Referee: Mike Roche
- TV announcers (CBSSN): Meghan McPeak (play-by-play), Christian Fauria (color analyst), and Justin Walters (sideline)
- Box Score

Game information

First quarter

- MASS – Cameron Carson 23-yard field goal, 4:43. Minutemen 3–0. Drive: 8 plays, 75 yards, TOP 04:29
- CONN – Devontae Houston 75 yd run (Noe Ruelas kick), 4:32. Huskies 7–3. Drive: 1 plays, 75 yards, TOP 00:11

Second quarter

- CONN – Noe Ruelas 23-yard field goal, 9:23. Huskies 10–3. Drive: 14 plays, 52 yards, TOP 05:37
- MASS – Cam Sullivan-Brown 53 yd pass from Brady Olson (Cameron Carson kick), 6:51. Tied 10–10. Drive: 5 plays, 70 yards, TOP 02:26
- CONN – Noe Ruelas 26-yard field goal, 0:59. Huskies 13–10. Drive: 6 plays, 30 yards, TOP 01:17

Third quarter

- CONN – Victor Rosa 5 yd run (Noe Ruelas kick), 4:55. Huskies 20–10. Drive: 4 plays, 42 yards, TOP 01:34

Fourth quarter

- CONN – Victor Rosa 12 yd run (Noe Ruelas kick), 6:54. Huskies 27–10. Drive: 9 plays, 74 yards, TOP 05:11

Top passers

- CONN – Zion Turner – 6/13, 60 yards
- MASS – Brady Olson – 12/19, 155 yards

Top rushers

- CONN – Victor Rosa – 17 rushes, 87 yards, 2 TDs
- MASS – Ellis Merriweather – 12 rushes, 33 yards

Top receivers

- CONN – Justin Joly – 2 receptions, 33 yards
- MASS – Cam Sullivan-Brown – 5 receptions, 124 yards, 1 TD

Top defense

- CONN – Durante Jones – 14 tackles
- MASS – Tyler Rudolph – 10 tackles

Statistics	UConn	UMass
First downs	18	18
Total yards	334	351
Rushing yards	274	85
Passing yards	60	266
Turnovers	0	2
Time of possession	30:14	29:46

=== Liberty ===
Liberty Flames at UConn Huskies – Game summary

Quarter	1	2	3	4	Total
Flames	3	14	10	6	33
Huskies	14	7	0	15	36

at Pratt & Whitney Stadium at Rentschler Field • East Hartford, Connecticut

- Date: November 12
- Game time: 12:02 p.m.
- Game weather: Temperature: 68 °F (20 °C) • Weather: Sunny
- Game attendance: 15,107
- Referee: Marcus Woods
- TV announcers (CBSSN): Meghan McPeak (play-by-play), Christian Fauria (color analyst), and Justin Walters (sideline)
- Box Score

Game information

First quarter

- CONN – Victor Rosa 16 yd run (Noe Ruelas kick), 10:28. Huskies 7–0. Drive: 8 plays, 51 yards, TOP 04:27
- LU – Nick Brown 38-yard field goal, 7:31. Huskies 7–3. Drive: 8 plays, 55 yards, TOP 02:57
- CONN – Jackson Mitchell 31 yd fumble recovery (Noe Ruelas kick), 1:47. Huskies 14–3.

Second quarter

- LU – CJ Yarbrough 3 yd pass from Johnathan Bennett (Nick Brown kick), 13:00. Huskies 14–10. Drive: 4 plays, 49 yards, TOP 01:13
- CONN – Robert Burns 1 yd run (Noe Ruelas kick), 5:16. Huskies 21–10. Drive: 8 plays, 94 yards, TOP 04:08
- LU – Malik Caper 1 yd run (Nick Brown kick), 00:35. Huskies 21–17. Drive: 8 plays, 47 yards, TOP 01:36

Third quarter

- LU – TJ Green 1 yd run (Nick Brown kick), 12:33. Flames 24–21. Drive: 7 plays, 80 yards, TOP 02:21
- LU – Nick Brown 34-yard field goal, 4:24. Flames 27–21. Drive: 17 plays, 59 yards, TOP 06:12

Fourth quarter

- CONN – Victor Rosa 27 yd run (Noe Ruelas kick), 14:52. Huskies 28–27. Drive: 8 plays, 75 yards, TOP 04:32
- LU – Demario Douglas 75 yd run (2 pt conv no good), 14:39. Flames 33–28. Drive: 1 plays, 75 yards, TOP 00:13
- CONN – Kevens Clercius 30 yd pass from Zion Turner (Keelan Marion pass good), 5:43. Huskies 36–33. Drive: 6 plays, 41 yards, TOP 02:57

Top passers

- CONN – Zion Turner – 15/21, 102 yards, 1 TD
- LU – Johnathan Bennett – 23/37, 201 yards, 1 TD

Top rushers

- CONN – Robert Burns – 11 rushes, 104 yards, 1 TD
- LU – TJ Green – 24 rushes, 119 yards, 1 TD

Top receivers

- CONN – Aaron Turner – 10 receptions, 65 yards
- LU – Demario Douglas – 8 receptions, 70 yards

Top defense

- CONN – Ian Swenson – 11 tackles
- LU – Javon Scruggs – 8 tackles

Statistics	UConn	Liberty
First downs	15	29
Total yards	318	474
Rushing yards	209	267
Passing yards	109	207
Turnovers	2	2
Time of possession	32:18	27:42

=== At Army ===
UConn Huskies at Army Black Knights – Game summary

Quarter	1	2	3	4	Total
Huskies	3	7	7	0	17
Black Knights	7	6	14	7	34

at Michie Stadium • West Point, New York

- Date: November 19
- Game time: 12:07 p.m.
- Game weather: Temperature: 39 °F (4 °C) • Weather: Sunny
- Game attendance: 31,229
- Referee: Gary Patterson
- TV announcers (CBSSN): Jason Knapp (play-by-play), Ross Tucker (color analyst) and Tina Cervasio (sideline)
- Box Score

Game information

First quarter

- Army – Miles Stewart 0 yd punt return (Quinn Maretzki kick), 12:50. Black Knights 7–0.
- CONN – Noe Ruelas 26-yard field goal, 6:04. Black Knights 7–3. Drive: 14 plays, 67 yards, TOP 06:39

Second quarter

- CONN – Victor Rosa 43 yd run (Noe Ruelas kick), 3:12. Huskies 10–7. Drive: 7 plays, 80 yards, TOP 03:47
- Army – Jemel Jones 1 yd run (kick no good), 0:18. Black Knights 13–10. Drive: 11 plays, 75 yards, TOP 02:54

Third quarter

- CONN – Zion Turner 1 yd run (Noe Ruelas kick), 8:33. Huskies 17–13. Drive: 9 plays, 70 yards, TOP 04:27
- Army – Braheam Murphy 75 yd run (Quinn Maretzki kick), 8:20. Black Knights 20–17. Drive: 1 plays, 75 yards, TOP 00:13
- Army – Tyhier Tyler 4 yd run (Quinn Maretzki kick), 0:19. Black Knights 27–17. Drive: 5 plays, 38 yards, TOP 02:43

Fourth quarter

- Army – Tyhier Tyler 2 yd run (Quinn Maretzki kick), 4:23. Black Knights 34–17. Drive: 8 plays, 27 yards, TOP 02:50

Top passers

- CONN – Zion Turner – 14/24, 116 yards
- ARMY – Tyhier Tyler – 0/1, 0 yards

Top rushers

- CONN – Victor Rosa – 12 rushes, 111 yards, 1 TD
- ARMY – Braheam Murphy – 7 rushes, 124 yards, 1 TD

Top receivers

- CONN – Aaron Turner – 5 receptions, 43 yards, 0 TD
- ARMY – Joshua Lingenfelter – 0 receptions, 0 yards

Top defense

- CONN – Jackson Mitchell – 16 tackles
- ARMY – Marquel Broughton – 12 tackles

Statistics	UConn	Army
First downs	18	15
Total yards	370	320
Rushing yards	254	320
Passing yards	116	0
Turnovers	2	0
Time of possession	29:40	30:20

=== vs. Marshall—Myrtle Beach Bowl ===
Myrtle Beach Bowl – Marshall Thundering Herd vs UConn Huskies – Game summary

Quarter	1	2	3	4	Total
Thundering Herd	14	7	7	0	28
Huskies	0	0	14	0	14

at Brooks Stadium • Conway, South Carolina

- Date: December 19
- Game time: 2:34 p.m.
- Game weather: Temperature: 49 °F (9 °C) • Weather: Sunny
- Game attendance: 12,023
- Referee: Ron Hudson
- TV announcers (ESPN): Mike Morgan (play-by-play), Eric Man Lain (color analyst), and Tera Talmadge (sideline)
- Box Score

Game information

First quarter

- MAR – Corey Gammage 9 yd pass from Cam Fancher (Rece Verhoff kick), 11:15. Thundering Herd 7–0. Drive: 2 plays, 16 yards, TOP 00:38
- MAR – Damion Barber Jr. 34 yd interception return (Rece Verhoff kick), 3:23. Thundering Herd 14–0.

Second quarter

- MAR – Devin Miller 10 yd pass from Cam Fancher (Rece Verhoff kick), 7:05. Thundering Herd 21–0. Drive: 4 plays, 73 yards, TOP 01:20

Third quarter

- MAR – Rasheen Ali 2 yd run (Rece Verhoff kick), 9:51. Thundering Herd 28–0. Drive: 10 plays, 79 yards, TOP 04:05
- CONN – Victor Rosa 14 yd run (Noe Ruelas kick), 5:35. Thundering Herd 28–7. Drive: 9 plays, 75 yards, TOP 04:16
- CONN – Victor Rosa 24 yd run (Noe Ruelas kick), 0:00. Thundering Herd 28–14. Drive: 4 plays, 40 yards, TOP 01:56

Top passers

- CONN – Zion Turner – 9/27, 166 yards
- MAR – Cam Fancher – 10/20, 93 yards, 2 TDs

Top rushers

- CONN – Victor Rosa – 16 rushes, 75 yards, 2 TDs
- MAR – Rasheen Ali – 15 rushes, 92 yards, 1 TD

Top receivers

- CONN – Keelan Marion – 2 receptions, 69 yards
- MAR – Corey Gammage – 3 receptions, 50 yards, 1 TD

Top defense

- CONN – Brandon Bouyer-Randle – 10 tackles
- MAR – Eli Neal – 10 tackles

Statistics	UConn	Marshall
First downs	18	19
Total yards	316	303
Rushing yards	144	210
Passing yards	172	93
Turnovers	4	2
Time of possession	31:21	28:39

== Roster ==
2022 UConn Huskies football team roster
Players
Coaches
Offense

Pos.	#	Name	Class
WR	1	Keelan Marion (injured)	So
WR	2	Nigel Fitzgerald	GS
WR	3	Ethon Williams	Fr
WR	4	Matt Drayton	So
WR	5	Aaron Turner	So
QB	6	Ta'Quan Roberson (injured)	So
WR	7	Cameron Ross	So
WR	8	Dajon Harrison	Fr
WR	9	Darius Bush	Fr
QB	10	Cale Millen	Fr
QB	11	Zion Turner	Fr
QB	12	Tyler Phommachanh	Fr
QB	13	Jacob Drena	So
TE	14	Nick Harris	So
WR	15	Mark Didio Jr.	So
WR	16	Kevens Clercius	So
TE	17	Justin Joly	Fr
WR	18	Kylish Hicks	Fr
WR	19	Kevin Dunn	So
RB	22	Victor Rosa	Fr
RB	25	Devontae Houston	So
RB	26	Nate Carter	So
RB	28	Brian Brewton	So
RB	30	Robert Burns	GS
WR	39	Hayden Jordon	So
RB	41	Hunter Clark	Fr
OL	51	Yakiri Walker	Fr
OL	55	Gamaliel Barboza	Sr
OL	58	Kyle Juergans	Fr
OL	60	Mason Raymer	So
OL	61	Jesse Polansky	So
OL	62	Noel Ofori-Nyadu	Jr
OL	63	Braden Radcliffe	Fr
OL	64	Christian Haynes	Jr
OL	66	Brady Wayburn	Fr
OL	67	Christopher Fortin	So
OL	69	Will Meyer	So
OL	70	Jack Stewart	Fr
OL	71	Valentin Senn	So
OL	72	Jake Guidone	GS
OL	73	Rayonte Brown	So
OL	73	Dayne Shor	Fr
OL	75	Chase Lundt	So
OL	76	Nikko Pohahau	Jr
OL	77	Ben Murawski	Fr
OL	79	Danny Antolovich	Fr
TE	81	Owen DeSilva	Fr
TE	82	Brendan Heatherman	Fr
TE	83	Brandon Niemenski	So
WR	84	Jacob Flynn	So
TE	85	Russell Dixon	So
TE	87	Bo Estes	So

Defense

Pos.	#	Name	Class
LB	0	Brandon Bouyer-Randle	Fr
DB	1	Malik Dixon	So
DB	2	Myles Bell	Jr
DB	3	Deon Mclean Jr.	Fr
DB	4	Stan Cross	Jr
DB	5	Kaleb Anthony	So
LB	6	Ian Swenson	Sr
DB	7	Tre Wortham	Sr
LB	8	Jackson Mitchell	Jr
LB	9	Langston Hardy	Fr
DB	10	Chris Shearin	Fr
LB	11	Marquez Bembry	GS
LB	12	Prince-Razeeq Samuels	Fr
DB	14	Malcolm Bell	Fr
LB	15	Tui Faumuina-Brown	So
DB	18	Jaylen Jones	So
DB	19	Durante Jones	So
DB	20	Camryn Edwards	Fr
DB	21	Lee Molette III	Fr
DB	22	Alfred Chea	So
DB	23	Juan Rosario	Jr
LB	24	Desmond Fogle	So
DB	25	D'Mon Brinson	Fr
DB	26	Isiah Davis	Fr
DB	27	Thaddeus Dixon	Fr
DB	28	Derek Spearman Jr.	Fr
LB	29	Jordan Morrison	Jr
LB	33	Hunter Webb	Jr
DL	37	Kayode Oladele	Fr
LB	46	John Bechtle	So
LB	47	Justin Bryant	Jr
DL	56	Carter Hooper	Fr
LB	58	Donovan Branch	Fr
LB	59	Nathan Voorhis	Fr
DL	65	Aaron Lange	So
DL	90	Pryce Yates	Fr
DL	91	Collin McCarthy	So
DL	92	Matt Hoffman	Fr
DL	93	Timothy Passmore Jr.	Fr
DL	95	Eric Watts	Jr
DL	96	Dal'mont Gourdine	So
DL	97	Jelani Stafford	Fr
DL	98	Jori Benson	Fr
DL	99	Sokoya McDuffie	Jr

Special teams

Pos.	#	Name	Class
P	16	George Caratan	Fr
K	17	Noe Ruelas	So
LS	31	Tommy Zozus	GS
LS	44	Nilay Upadhyayula	So
K	84	Joe McFadden	So
P	97	Bruno Perlicki	Fr

Head coach

- Jim L. Mora

Coordinators/assistant coaches

- Nick Charlton
  Assistant head coach/offensive coordinator/quarterbacks
- Lou Spanos
  Defensive coordinator
- Doug Shearer
  Special teams coordinator
- John Allen
  Wide receivers coach/passing game coordinator
- E. J. Barthel
  Running backs coach
- Siriki Diabate
  Linebackers coach
- Dalton Hilliard
  Defensive backs coach
- John Marinelli
  Tight ends coach
- Kenny McClendon
  Defensive line coach
- Gordon Sammis
  Offensive line coach

Legend

- (C) Team captain
- (S) Suspended
- (I) Ineligible
- Injured
- Redshirt

Roster
Last update: August 4, 2022
