= 2022 Myrtle Beach Bowl =

Postseason college football bowl game

- 3rd Myrtle Beach Bowl
Marshall Thundering Herd	UConn Huskies
(8–4)	(6–6)
Sun Belt	Independent
28	14
Head coach: Charles Huff	Head coach: Jim L. Mora
	1	2	3	4	Total
Marshall	14	7	7	0	28
UConn	0	0	14	0	14
- Date: December 19, 2022
- Season: 2022
- Stadium: Brooks Stadium
- Location: Conway, South Carolina
- MVP: Rasheen Ali (RB, Marshall)
- Favorite: Marshall by 11
- Referee: Ron Hudson (MAC)
- Attendance: 12,023

United States TV coverage
- Network: ESPN
- Announcers: Mike Morgan (play-by-play), Eric Mac Lain (analyst), and Tera Talmadge (sideline)

International TV coverage
- Network: ESPN Brazil
- Announcers: ESPN Brazil: Matheus Suman (play-by-play) and Weinny Eirado (analyst)

The 2022 Myrtle Beach Bowl was a postseason college football bowl game played on December 19, 2022, at Brooks Stadium in Conway, South Carolina. The third annual Myrtle Beach Bowl, the game featured the Marshall Thundering Herd of the Sun Belt Conference and the University of Connecticut (UConn) Huskies, who were not affiliated with a football conference. The bowl game was the final contest concluding the 2022 NCAA Division I Football Bowl Subdivision (Division I FBS) football season for both teams, and ended in a 28–14 victory for Marshall.

The game began at 2:34 p.m. EST. Both offenses started sub-optimally with fumbles on their first drives, with UConn's coming on their first play from scrimmage. Marshall scored the game's first points with a touchdown on the second play of their second drive, and doubled their lead with an interception returned for a touchdown later in the first quarter. After punts by both teams, UConn missed an opportunity to score when a 45-yard field goal was not converted, and Marshall took advantage by scoring a touchdown on their next drive. A turnover on downs and a punt took the game to halftime, though early in the second half both teams scored touchdowns, and UConn scored a second on their next drive to shrink their deficit to 14 points. Their final two drives resulted in another turnover on downs and an interception, though, and the game finished with Marshall defeating UConn, 28–14.

== Teams ==
Reflecting conference tie-ins, the game featured the Marshall Thundering Herd from the Sun Belt Conference. Even though the bowl has tie-ins with the American Athletic Conference and Mid-American Conference, Marshall's opponent was selected to be the FBS independent UConn Huskies. This was the second all-time meeting between UConn and Marshall; the Thundering Herd defeated the Huskies 16–10 in the 2015 St. Petersburg Bowl, their only prior meeting.

=== Marshall ===
Marshall began the season 2–0 with a win over Norfolk State and an upset victory against No. 8 Notre Dame before losing the next two games against Bowling Green in overtime and to eventual Sun Belt Conference champions Troy. Marshall would start October with a victory over Gardner-Webb before falling to Louisiana. The Thundering Herd earned their first conference win over fellow newcomers James Madison before losing their homecoming game against conference powerhouse Coastal Carolina. Marshall would then go undefeated in November by beating Old Dominion in a game that saw the only points scored by field goals, Appalachian State in the yearly memorial game dedicated to the 75 people killed in the November 14, 1970, plane crash, Georgia Southern to earn bowl eligibility, and Georgia State. The Thundering Herd finished the season with an 8–4 record (5–3 in Sun Belt games) to finish third in the East Division. This was Marshall's first bowl game against an independent team and their first bowl as a member of the Sun Belt Conference; they entered with a three-game bowl losing streak dating to 2019.

=== UConn ===
UConn began the season on the road in a loss to Utah State before winning their home opener against Central Connecticut. The Huskies would then lose three straight games to rival Syracuse, No. 4 Michigan and No. 12 NC State. Sitting at 1–4 to begin October, UConn would win their next two contests against Fresno State at home and FIU on the road before falling to Ball State. The Huskies would then upset Boston College at home for the homecoming game and win the next two games at home against rival UMass and Liberty to become bowl eligible before losing the season finale to Army. The Huskies finished the season with a 6–6 record. This was UConn's first bowl game against a team from the Sun Belt Conference and first as an independent, as well as their first bowl appearance since 2015.

== Game summary ==
The Myrtle Beach Bowl was televised on ESPN, with a commentary team of Mike Morgan, Eric Mac Lain, and Tera Talmadge. The game's officiating crew, representing the Mid-American Conference, was led by referee Ron Hudson and umpire John Hanneke. Played at Brooks Stadium in Conway, South Carolina, the weather at the game's kickoff was sunny with a temperature of 49 °F (9 °C).

=== First half ===
Scheduled for a start time of 2:30 p.m. EST, the Myrtle Beach Bowl began at 2:34 p.m. with Noe Ruelas's opening kickoff, which was returned to the Marshall 31-yard-line for the Thundering Herd's first possession. Khalan Laborn earned the first big gain of the day with a 13-yard rush on the game's second play, and he was on the receiving end of quarterback Cam Fancher's first completed pass, gaining nine yards. Laborn rushed for three yards on the next play and the Thundering Herd converted for a first down, but from there gained nine yards on their next three plays to bring up 4th & 1. They attempted to go for it, but Fancher fumbled on the play and the ball was recovered by UConn's Durante Jones at the UConn 34-yard-line. The Huskies offense was unable to capitalize: they fumbled the ball right back on their first play as Zion Turner lost it and Isaiah Norman recovered it for Marshall, returning it to the UConn 16-yard-line. After a 7-yard pass from Fancher to Cory Gammage, the two connected again for a 9-yard gain, this time for a touchdown. Rece Verhoff converted the extra point, giving Marshall an early 7–0 lead. UConn's next drive started at their own 26-yard-line; after losing 1 yard on their first play, they gained 5 on third down but were forced to punt. George Caratan's kick was fair caught at the Marshall 37-yard-line, setting up Marshall's next drive. After an 5-yard rush by Rasheen Ali on their first play, they faced 3rd & 5, but a holding penalty on third down put them behind the sticks and John McConnell was brought on for Marshall's first punt of the day, which went out-of-bounds at the UConn 25-yard-line. UConn earned a first down for the first time on their second play of the ensuing series, with a 13-yard Devontae Houston rush, though the Huskies offense stalled from there and they were forced to punt. Marshall gained nine yards on their first two plays combined and converted third down with a 4-yard rush by Laborn, but they were unable to pick up another one and had to punt again. McConnell's kick was fielded by Cam Ross and returned to the UConn 38-yard-line. Brian Brewton got the carry on UConn's first play of the next drive, but on the next play Turner's pass was intercepted by Damion Barber Jr. at the UConn 34-yard-line and returned for a touchdown, doubling Marshall's lead. After getting the ball right back, UConn was penalized with delay of game before running their first play, and was unable to dig out of the resulting hole, punting on 4th & 12 and downing the ball at the Marshall 41-yard-line. Ali rushed for 11 yards into UConn territory on the next play and the Herd gained six in their next three plays but were forced to punt again on fourth down, allowing UConn to take possession at their own 8-yard-line. Cale Millen rushed for a loss of 2 yards before time expired for the end of the first quarter.

UConn started the second quarter with 2nd & 12 at their own 6-yard-line, and gained five yards on their next two plays to set up another punting situation. A penalty on each team ended up canceling each other out, and Caratan punted for 44 yards; after a return and a penalty, Marshall began their drive on their own 30-yard-line. The Thundering Herd quickly went three-and-out with a gain of 4, loss of 3, and incomplete pass before a punt to the UConn 33-yard-line. UConn's most successful drive to this point then took place with two first downs earned within the first three plays, on a 28-yard rush by Houston immediately followed by a 12-yard rush by Turner, which advanced the ball all the way to the Marshall 23-yard-line. This momentum halted quickly, though; a loss of 4 yards and another for no gain brought up third-and-long, and an incomplete pass prompted a field goal attempt. The kick by Noe Ruelas from 45 yards was missed, keeping UConn off of the scoreboard and giving Marshall possession again. A face mask penalty against UConn on Marshall's first play advanced the ball to the Herd 47-yard-line, and they moved into the red zone with a 38-yard rush by Ali. Marshall scored on the next play, as Fancher passed to Devin Miller for a 10-yard touchdown. After the extra point, UConn received the kickoff at their own 43-yard-line but a penalty for unsportsmanlike conduct moved it back to the UConn 15-yard-line instead. After stalling and facing 3rd & 12, they were given a first down from a defensive holding penalty. The Huskies moved the ball into Marshall territory with a 37-yard pass from Turner to Keelan Marion, and Victor Rosa rushed for 9 yards several plays later to earn his team another first down. Another Turner pass, this one for 12 yards to Justin Joly, moved the ball inside the Marshall red zone, but the Huskies faced 3rd & 6 soon thereafter. Back-to-back incomplete passes by Turner resulted in a turnover on downs, giving the Thundering Herd possession from their own 13-yard-line. On their ensuing drive, Marshall drained all but two seconds off of the clock with a trio of short runs and punted back to UConn with two seconds remaining. On the last play of the half, Zion Turner's Hail Mary pass was intercepted in the end zone by Abraham Beauplan, ending the second quarter.

=== Second half ===
UConn got possession to begin the second half, and started their first drive at their own 27-yard-line. They started with a rush for no gain but got 6 yards on second down, though they were unable to earn more and punted on 4th & 4, downed at the Marshall 21-yard-line. Facing 3rd & 5 early in their series, Payne rushed for 6 yards and the Herd were aided by a personal foul that advanced the ball to the Marshall 47-yard-line. They crossed into UConn territory with a 7-yard rush by Laborn on the next play, and Laborn earned a first down with a 6-yard rush on the next play. After a 10-yard rush by Ali on a later third-and-long, the Herd advanced inside the red zone as the result of a pass interference penalty called against the Huskies. A 12-yard Fancher rush put Marshall in position to score, which they did on the next play with a 2-yard Ali rush and a Rece Verhoff extra point. UConn got the ball back after a touchback and were able to move the ball, converting 3rd & 6 with a 6-yard Turner rush. They spent two timeouts and later gained 32 yards on a pass from Turner to Marion; on the next play, UConn scored for the first time on a 14-yard rush by Rosa. A trio of rushes to open Marshall's next series earned them 12 yards and a first down, though the drive ended shortly thereafter as they gained 1 yard on first down but lost 1 yard on third down, with an incomplete pass in between, forcing them to punt with two minutes remaining in the quarter. McConnell's kick went out-of-bounds at the Marshall 40-yard-line; following a rush by Brewton for a loss of one yard, Turner passed to Ross for 12 yards, after which Rosa rushed for five. On the next play, which was the final one of the third quarter, Rosa rushed for a 24-yard touchdown, bringing the Huskies' deficit to fourteen points with Ruelas's extra point.

The final quarter began with Noe Ruelas's kickoff which was returned to the Marshall 26-yard-line. Fancher connected with Gammage on Marshall's first play, gaining 34 yards, but the Thundering Herd gave up the ball two plays later as Fancher was intercepted by Malik Dixon-Williams at the UConn 17-yard-line. Rosa rushed for 15 yards on the Huskies' second play after regaining possession, and a face mask penalty against Marshall advanced the ball to the Marshall 42-yard-line. After UConn's ensuing first down play, the Huskies were penalized for unsportsmanlike conduct, setting them back 15 yards. They would not be able to recover from this penalty, and ultimately turned the ball over on downs after a failed attempt to convert 4th & 13. Marshall could not extend their lead with their new possession; they went three-and-out with three rushes for a net total of four yards. Another unsportsmanlike conduct foul, this time against Marshall, occurred on UConn's ensuing drive, moving the ball to the UConn 44-yard-line, and the Huskies benefitted again with a defense pass interference that moved the ball over midfield and gave them an automatic first down. A 33-yard pass followed, putting them inside the Marshall 10-yard-line, though they would soon be behind the sticks due to a holding penalty and ultimately Turner threw an interception in the end zone on 3rd & Goal from the 20-yard-line. Marshall started with a touchback with under five minutes to play, and ran exclusively rushing plays in order to drain the clock, as the Huskies had only one timeout remaining. Laborn got each of the first four carries of the drive, gaining a total of 17 yards, before UConn called timeout with 2:43 remaining. Ali rushed for 10 yards before Laborn carried twice more and Payne rushed for 9 yards before time expired, ending the game with Marshall victorious, 28–14. The game ended at 6:05 p.m., after a total duration of three hours and 31 minutes.

=== Scoring summary ===
2022 Myrtle Beach Bowl

Quarter	1	2	3	4	Total
Marshall	14	7	7	0	28
UConn	0	0	14	0	14

at Brooks Stadium • Conway, South Carolina

- Date: Monday, December 19, 2022
- Game time: 2:30 p.m. EST
- Game weather: Sunny • Temperature: 49 °F (9 °C) • Wind: 6 mph (9.7 km/h) north
- Game attendance: 12,023
- Referee: Ron Hudson
- TV announcers (ESPN): Mike Morgan (play-by-play), Eric Mac Lain (analyst), and Tera Talmadge (sideline)
- Box score

Scoring summary

Quarter	Time	Drive			Team	Scoring information	Score	
Quarter	Time	Plays	Yards	TOP	Team	Scoring information	Marshall	UConn
1	11:15	2	16	0:38	Marshall	Corey Gammage 9-yard touchdown reception from Cam Fancher, Rece Verhoff kick good	7	0
1	3:23				Marshall	Interception returned 34 yards for touchdown by Damion Barber Jr., Rece Verhoff kick good	14	0
2	7:05	4	73	1:20	Marshall	Devin Miller 10-yard touchdown reception from Cam Fancher, Rece Verhoff kick good	21	0
3	9:51	10	79	4:05	Marshall	Rasheen Ali 2-yard touchdown run, Rece Verhoff kick good	28	0
3	5:35	9	75	4:16	UConn	Victor Rosa 14-yard touchdown run, Noe Ruelas kick good	28	7
3	0:01	4	40	1:55	UConn	Victor Rosa 24-yard touchdown run, Noe Ruelas kick good	28	14
"TOP" = time of possession. For other American football terms, see Glossary of American football.							28	14

== Statistics ==
Team statistical comparison
Statistic	Marshall	UConn
First downs	19	18
First downs rushing	13	8
First downs passing	3	5
First downs penalty	3	5
Third down efficiency	7–15	3–12
Fourth down efficiency	0–1	0–2
Total plays–net yards	65–303	67–316
Rushing attempts–net yards	45–210	38–144
Yards per rush	4.7	3.8
Yards passing	93	172
Pass completions–attempts	10–20	11–30
Interceptions thrown	1	3
Punt returns–total yards	0–0	3–5
Kickoff returns–total yards	3–55	3–56
Punts–average yardage	7–32.9	5–31.4
Fumbles–lost	2–1	1–1
Penalties–yards	11–112	10–115
Time of possession	28:39	31:21

Marshall statistics
Thundering Herd passing
	C–A	Yds	TD–INT
Cam Fancher	10–20	93	2–1
Thundering Herd rushing
	Car	Yds	TD
Rasheen Ali	15	92	1
Khalan Laborn	21	90	0
Ethan Payne	3	18	0
Cam Fancher	6	10	0
Thundering Herd receiving
	Rec	Yds	TD
Corey Gammage	3	50	1
Devin Miller	2	17	1
Khalan Laborn	1	9	0
Charles Montgomery	2	8	0
Shadeed Ahmed	1	5	0
Caleb McMillan	1	4	0

UConn statistics
Huskies passing
	C–A	Yds	TD–INT
Zion Turner	9–27	166	0–3
Cale Millen	2–3	6	0–0
Huskies rushing
	Car	Yds	TD
Victor Rosa	16	75	2
Devontae Houston	5	40	0
Zion Turner	6	25	0
Brian Brewton	5	5	0
Robert Burns	3	3	0
Cale Millen	3	−4	0
Huskies receiving
	Rec	Yds	TD
Keelan Marion	2	69	0
Aaron Turner	5	65	0
Cam Ross	2	21	0
Justin Joly	1	12	0
Jacob Flynn	1	5	0
