= Charles Huff (American football coach) =

American football coach (born 1983)

Current position
- Title: Head coach
- Team: Memphis
- Conference: American
- Record: 8-3

Biographical details
- Born: April 26, 1983 (age 43); Denton, Maryland, U.S.

Playing career
- 2001–2005: Hampton
- Positions: Fullback, tight end, guard, center

Coaching career (HC unless noted)
- 2006: Tennessee State (OL)
- 2007–2008: Tennessee State (TE/ST)
- 2009: Maryland (asst. OL)
- 2010: Hampton (OL/RGC)
- 2011: Vanderbilt (OQC)
- 2012: Buffalo Bills (asst. RB)
- 2013: Western Michigan (RB)
- 2014–2017: Penn State (RB/ST)
- 2018: Mississippi State (AHC/RGC/RB)
- 2019–2020: Alabama (AHC/RB)
- 2021–2024: Marshall
- 2025: Southern Miss
- 2026–present: Memphis

Head coaching record
- Overall: 47-28
- Bowls: 1–2

Accomplishments and honors

Championships
- As a head coach 1 Sun Belt (2024); 1 Sun Belt East Division (2024) As an assistant coach 1 National (2020)

Charles Huff Jr. (born April 26, 1983) is an American college football coach who is the head football coach at the University of Memphis, a position he has held since 2026. Prior to Memphis, he was the head coach at the University of Southern Mississippi in 2025, the head coach at Marshall University from 2021 to 2024, and the associate head coach and running backs coach at the University of Alabama. Additionally, he had coaching stints at Mississippi State and Penn State and has gained the reputation of being one of the top recruiters in college football.

== Playing career ==
Huff played at Hampton University, joining the football team as a walk-on fullback. In addition to fullback, he also spent time at tight end and guard before being named the starting center. He was named a team captain his senior season in addition to being the starting center.

== Coaching career ==
Huff got his first coaching job at Tennessee State in 2006 working under Tigers offensive coordinator Fred Kaiss, who he played under at Hampton. He was named the tight ends and special teams coach in 2007, and also added football operations duties as well. He left to join the coaching staff at Maryland as the assistant offensive line coach in 2009, before joining his alma mater Hampton in 2010 as the offensive line coach and run game coordinator. He spent 2011 as an offensive quality control coach at Vanderbilt under first-year Commodores head coach and former Maryland offensive coordinator James Franklin. He spent 2012 with the Buffalo Bills as their assistant running backs coach under head coach Chan Gailey before joining the coaching staff at Western Michigan in 2013 as their running backs coach under first year head coach P. J. Fleck.

=== Penn State ===
Huff was named the running backs coach and special teams coordinator at Penn State in 2014, reuniting with James Franklin, who was the offensive coordinator at Maryland when Huff was the assistant offensive line coach. During his time at Penn State, he played a crucial role in the recruitment and development of running back Saquon Barkley, who was named a consensus All-American, 2× Big Ten Offensive Player of the Year, and left as one of the program's top running backs of all time.

=== Mississippi State ===
Huff joined the coaching staff at Mississippi State in 2018, the first hire of new Bulldogs head coach and former Penn State offensive coordinator Joe Moorhead. In his lone season at Starkville, their running backs ran the ball 253 times, and did not lose a fumble once.

=== Alabama ===
Huff was named the associate head coach and running backs coach at Alabama in 2019. At Alabama, Huff was the position coach for Najee Harris, who was named the 2020 Doak Walker Award for the best running back in the nation en route to Alabama's 18th National Championship.

=== Marshall ===
Huff was hired as the head coach at Marshall in 2021, replacing Doc Holliday. On September 10, 2022, Huff led Marshall to their second all-time victory over a top-10 opponent after defeating the No. 8-ranked Notre Dame Fighting Irish 26–21 in South Bend, Indiana. Huff earned his first bowl win as a head coach in the 2022 Myrtle Beach Bowl against the UConn Huskies 28–14. In 2024, Huff led the Thundering Herd to their first Sun Belt crown ever and their first conference championship for any league in ten years.

=== Southern Miss ===
Despite winning the Sun Belt in his final contract year at Marshall, the two parties failed to reach an agreement on an extension, leading to Huff's departure. On December 8, 2024, Huff was named the head coach at fellow Sun Belt Conference member, Southern Miss. In Huff's first game, the Golden Eagles lost 34–17 to Mississippi State. He led the team to its first year of bowl-eligibility since 2022, with a win over Louisiana–Monroe (49–21) on October 25, 2025.

=== Memphis ===
On December 6, 2025, reporting indicated that Huff was in final negotiations on a five-year contract to become the head coach at the University of Memphis, succeeding Ryan Silverfield. His hiring was formally announced by the university on December 8.. In Huff's introductory press conference, the athletic director cited Huff's experience working with the University of Alabama and Penn State football programs, with a reference from former coach Nick Saban that "sealed the deal" for the hiring decision.

== Head coaching record ==
Year	Team	Overall	Conference	Standing	Bowl/playoffs
Marshall Thundering Herd (Conference USA) (2021)
2021	Marshall	7–6	5–3	T–2nd (East)	L New Orleans
Marshall Thundering Herd (Sun Belt Conference) (2022–2024)
2022	Marshall	9–4	5–3	3rd (East)	W Myrtle Beach
2023	Marshall	6–7	3–5	T–5th (East)	L Frisco
2024	Marshall	10–3	7–1	1st (East)	Independence (Note: Huff left for Southern Miss before Marshall's bowl game. Marshall also subsequently withdrew from the bowl game after losing over two dozen players to the transfer portal.)
Marshall:		32–20	20–12		
Southern Miss Golden Eagles (Sun Belt Conference) (2025)
2025	Southern Miss	7–5	5–3	T–2nd (West)	New Orleans (Note: Huff left for Memphis before Southern Miss' bowl game.)
Southern Miss:		7–5	5–3		
Memphis Tigers (American Conference) (2026–present)
2026	Memphis	8–3	5–2		
Memphis:		8–3	5–2		
Total:		47–28			
National championship Conference title Conference division title or championship game berth
