= 2022 Marshall Thundering Herd football team =

American college football season

2022 Marshall Thundering Herd football

Myrtle Beach Bowl champion

Myrtle Beach Bowl, W 28–14 vs. UConn
- Conference: Sun Belt Conference
- East Division
- Record: 9–4 (5–3 Sun Belt)
- Head coach: Charles Huff (2nd season)
- Offensive coordinator: Clint Trickett (1st season)
- Offensive scheme: Multiple
- Defensive coordinator: Lance Guidry (2nd season)
- Base defense: 4–3
- Home stadium: Joan C. Edwards Stadium

2022 Sun Belt Conference football standings
	Conf.			Overall
Team	W		L	W		L
East Division
James Madison* x	6	–	2	8	–	3
Coastal Carolina xy	6	–	2	9	–	4
Marshall	5	–	3	9	–	4
Georgia Southern	3	–	5	6	–	7
Appalachian State	3	–	5	6	–	6
Georgia State	3	–	5	4	–	8
Old Dominion	2	–	6	3	–	9
West Division
No. 19 Troy xy$	7	–	1	12	–	2
South Alabama x	7	–	1	10	–	3
Southern Miss	4	–	4	7	–	6
Louisiana	4	–	4	6	–	7
Louisiana–Monroe	3	–	5	4	–	8
Texas State	2	–	6	4	–	8
Arkansas State	1	–	7	3	–	9
Championship: Troy 45, Coastal Carolina 26
$ – Conference champion; x – Division champion/co-champions; y – Championship game participant; * – Ineligible for postseason play due to FCS-to-FBS transition rules; Rankings from AP Poll

The 2022 Marshall Thundering Herd football team represented Marshall University during the 2022 NCAA Division I FBS football season. The Thundering Herd played their home games at the Joan C. Edwards Stadium in Huntington, West Virginia, and competed in the East Division of the Sun Belt Conference. The team was coached by second-year head coach Charles Huff.

This was their inaugural season in the Sun Belt Conference after spending the previous 17 seasons as a member of Conference USA. For only the second time in program history Marshall beat a Top 10 ranked opponent, traveling to South Bend and knocking off 8th ranked Notre Dame 26-21 in Week 2.

== Preseason ==
=== Media poll ===
The Sun Belt media days were held on July 25 and July 26. The Thundering Herd were predicted to finish in fourth place in the Sun Belt's East Division.

=== Sun Belt Preseason All-Conference teams ===
Offense

1st team

- Rasheen Ali – Running back, RS-SO

Defense

2nd team

- Abraham Beauplan – Linebacker, RS-SR

== Schedule ==
All conference games were announced March 1, 2022.

Date	Time	Opponent	Site	TV	Result	Attendance
September 3	3:30 p.m.	Norfolk State*	Joan C. Edwards Stadium; Huntington, WV	ESPN3	W 55–3	24,607
September 10	2:30 p.m.	at No. 8 Notre Dame*	Notre Dame Stadium; Notre Dame, IN	NBC	W 26–21	77,622
September 17	5:00 p.m.	at Bowling Green*	Doyt Perry Stadium; Bowling Green, OH	NFLN	L 31–34 ^{OT}	21,158
September 24	7:00 p.m.	at Troy	Veterans Memorial Stadium; Troy, AL	NFLN	L 7–16	27,514
October 1	3:30 p.m.	Gardner–Webb*	Joan C. Edwards Stadium; Huntington, WV	ESPN+	W 28–7	19,845
October 12	7:30 p.m.	Louisiana	Joan C. Edwards Stadium; Huntington, WV	ESPN2	L 13–23	19,905
October 22	3:30 p.m.	at James Madison	Bridgeforth Stadium; Harrisonburg, VA	ESPN+	W 26–12	26,159
October 29	7:00 p.m.	Coastal Carolina^{†}	Joan C. Edwards Stadium; Huntington, WV	NFLN	L 13–24	24,954
November 5	2:00 p.m.	at Old Dominion	S.B. Ballard Stadium; Norfolk, VA	ESPN+	W 12–0	18,327
November 12	3:30 p.m.	Appalachian State	Joan C. Edwards Stadium; Huntington, WV (rivalry)	ESPN+	W 28–21	24,312
November 19	6:00 p.m.	at Georgia Southern	Paulson Stadium; Statesboro, GA	ESPN+	W 23–10	16,153
November 26	12:00 p.m.	Georgia State	Joan C. Edwards Stadium; Huntington, WV	ESPN+	W 28–23	17,427
December 19	2:30 p.m.	vs. UConn*	Brooks Stadium; Conway, SC (Myrtle Beach Bowl)	ESPN	W 28–14	12,023
*Non-conference game; ^{†}Homecoming; Rankings from AP Poll and CFP Rankings released prior to game; All times are in Eastern time

== Game summaries ==
=== Norfolk State ===
Game One – Norfolk State Spartans (0–0) at Marshall Thundering Herd (0–0)

Quarter	1	2	3	4	Total
Spartans	0	0	3	0	3
Thundering Herd	10	28	17	0	55

at Joan C. Edwards Stadium • Huntington, West Virginia

- Date: Saturday, September 3, 2022
- Game time: 3:30 p.m. EDT
- Game weather: Sunny • Temperature: 84 °F (29 °C) • Wind: None
- Game attendance: 24,607
- Referee: Jeremy Parker
- TV announcers (ESPN3): Chad Bush (play-by-play), Doug Chapman (analyst)

Game information

First quarter

- (9:32) MRSH – Rece Verhoff 30 yard field goal (Drive: 7 plays, 32 yards, 2:46; Marshall 3–0)
- (6:57) MRSH – Ethan Payne 45 yard run, Rece Verhoff kick (Drive: 3 plays, 55 yards, 0:58; Marshall 10–0)

Second quarter

- (10:14) MRSH – Khalan Laborn 4 yard run, Rece Verhoff kick (Drive: 11 plays, 72 yards, 3:59; Marshall 17–0)
- (8:52) MRSH – Owen Porter 21 yard fumble recovery, Rece Verhoff kick (Marshall 24–0)
- (3:43) MRSH – Corey Gammage 13 yard pass from Henry Colombi, Rece Verhoff kick (Drive: 7 plays, 72 yards, 2:09; Marshall 31–0)
- (0:30) MRSH – Ethan Payne 7 yard run, Rece Verhoff kick (Drive: 7 plays, 55 yards, 2:20; Marshall 38–0)

Third quarter

- (12:17) MRSH – Khalan Laborn 23 yard run, Rece Verhoff kick (Drive: 4 plays, 51 yards, 1:12; Marshall 45–0)
- (10:00) MRSH – Toby Payne 12 yard pass from Cam Fancher, Rece Verhoff kick (Drive: 3 plays, 40 yards, 1:09; Marshall 52–0)
- (5:19) MRSH – Rece Verhoff 27 yard field goal (Drive: 7 plays, 48 yards, 2:27; Marshall 55–0)
- (0:38) NORF – Grandin Willcox 25 yard field goal (Drive: 9 plays, 56 yards, 4:41; Marshall 55–3)

Statistics	NORF	MRSH
First downs	5	33
Plays–yards	45–114	81–612
Rushes–yards	31–30	51–380
Passing yards	84	232
Passing: comp–att–int	6–14–1	26–30–1
Time of possession	23:51	36:09

Team	Category	Player	Statistics
Norfolk State	Passing	Jaylan Adams	3/4, 54 yards
Norfolk State	Rushing	Jaylen White	4 carries, 15 yards
Norfolk State	Receiving	Jason Wonodi	2 receptions, 50 yards
Marshall	Passing	Henry Colombi	24/26, 205 yards, 1 TD, 1 INT
Marshall	Rushing	Ethan Payne	10 carries, 113 yards, 2 TD
Marshall	Receiving	Talik Keaton	8 receptions, 71 yards

=== At No. 8 Notre Dame ===
Game Two – Marshall Thundering Herd (1–0) at No. 8 Notre Dame Fighting Irish (0–1)

Quarter	1	2	3	4	Total
Thundering Herd	0	9	3	14	26
No. 8 Fighting Irish	0	7	0	14	21

at Notre Dame Stadium • Notre Dame, Indiana

- Date: Saturday, September 10, 2022
- Game time: 2:30 p.m. EDT
- Game weather: Sunny • Temperature: 84 °F (29 °C) • Wind: SW 9 mph
- Game attendance: 77,622
- Referee: Timothy Hedgepeth
- TV announcers (NBC): Jac Collinsworth (play-by-play), Jason Garrett (analyst), Zora Stephenson (sideline)

Game information

Second quarter

- (14:18) MRSH – Khalan Laborn 4 yard run, Rece Verhoff kick failed (Drive: 10 plays, 79 yards, 3:56; Marshall 6–0)
- (3:00) ND – Tyler Buchner 1 yard run, Blake Grupe kick (Drive: 5 plays, 56 yards, 2:03; Notre Dame 7–6)
- (0:15) MRSH – Rece Verhoff 21 yard field goal (Drive: 12 plays, 74 yards, 2:45; Marshall 9–7)

Third quarter

- (3:54) MRSH – Rece Verhoff 20 yard field goal (Drive: 9 plays, 46 yards, 4:10; Marshall 12–7)

Fourth quarter

- (14:57) ND – Tyler Buchner 1 yard run, Tyler Buchner run (Drive: 8 plays, 66 yards, 3:57; Notre Dame 15–12)
- (5:16) MRSH – Devin Miller 3 yard pass from Henry Colombi, Rece Verhoff kick (Drive: 11 plays, 94 yards, 5:16; Marshall 19–15)
- (4:35) MRSH – Steven Gilmore Jr. 37 yard interception return, Rece Verhoff kick (Marshall 26–15)
- (0:14) ND – Michael Mayer 5 yard pass from Drew Pyne, Drew Pyne pass failed (Drive: 7 plays, 32 yards, 1:42; Marshall 26–21)

Statistics	MRSH	ND
First downs	21	22
Plays–yards	71–364	75–351
Rushes–yards	50–219	37–130
Passing yards	145	221
Passing: comp–att–int	16–21–0	21–38–3
Time of possession	30:47	29:13

Team	Category	Player	Statistics
Marshall	Passing	Henry Colombi	16/21, 145 yards, 1 TD
Marshall	Rushing	Khalan Laborn	31 carries, 163 yards, 1 TD
Marshall	Receiving	Jayden Harrison	3 receptions, 38 yards
Notre Dame	Passing	Tyler Buchner	18/32, 201 yards, 2 INT
Notre Dame	Rushing	Tyler Buchner	13 carries, 44 yards, 2 TD
Notre Dame	Receiving	Michael Mayer	8 receptions, 103 yards, 1 TD

=== At Bowling Green ===
Game Three – Marshall Thundering Herd (2–0) at Bowling Green Falcons (0–2)

Quarter	1	2	3	4	OT	Total
Thundering Herd	14	7	0	7	3	31
Falcons	0	21	0	7	6	34

at Doyt Perry Stadium • Bowling Green, Ohio

- Date: Saturday, September 17, 2022
- Game time: 5:00 p.m. EDT
- Game weather: Sunny • Temperature: 82 °F (28 °C) • Wind: SW 9 mph
- Game attendance: 21,158
- Referee: Ted Pitts
- TV announcers (NFLN): Jason Ross Jr. (play-by-play), Tyoka Jackson (analyst)

Game information

First quarter

- (13:59) MRSH – Corey Gammage 51 yard pass from Henry Colombi, Rece Verhoff kick (Drive: 4 plays, 75 yards, 1:01; Marshall 7–0)
- (12:28) MRSH – Caleb McMillan 78 yard pass from Henry Colombi, Rece Verhoff kick (Drive: 2 plays, 79 yards, 0:41; Marshall 14–0)

Second quarter

- (12:30) BGSU – Odieu Hilliare 25 yard pass from Matt McDonald, Mason Lawler kick (Drive: 11 plays, 81 yards, 3:41; Marshall 14–7)
- (9:25) MRSH – Khalan Laborn 5 yard run, Rece Verhoff kick (Drive: 9 plays, 69 yards, 2:59; Marshall 21–7)
- (6:10) BGSU – Odieu Hilliare 27 yard pass from Matt McDonald, Mason Lawler kick (Drive: 6 plays, 75 yards, 3:15; Marshall 21–14)
- (1:44) BGSU – Cavon Croom 30 yard pass from Matt McDonald, Mason Lawler kick (Drive: 7 plays, 59 yards, 2:40; Tied 21–21)

Fourth quarter

- (13:08) BGSU – Harold Fannin Jr. 1 yard run, Mason Lawler kick (Drive: 14 plays, 80 yards, 5:54; Bowling Green 28–21)
- (5:43) MRSH – Khalan Laborn 8 yard run, Rece Verhoff kick (Drive: 6 plays, 53 yards, 2:17; Tied 28–28)

Overtime

- MRSH – Rece Verhoff 38 yard field goal (Drive: 4 plays, 4 yards; Marshall 31–28)
- BGSU – Ta'ron Keith 2 yard pass from Matt McDonald (Drive: 2 plays, 25 yards; Bowling Green 34–31)

Statistics	MRSH	BGSU
First downs	23	19
Plays–yards	75–547	74–377
Rushes–yards	37–191	27–77
Passing yards	356	300
Passing: comp–att–int	26–38–1	29–47–0
Time of possession	28:12	31:48

Team	Category	Player	Statistics
Marshall	Passing	Henry Colombi	23/34, 338 yards, 2 TD, 1 INT
Marshall	Rushing	Khalan Laborn	24 carries, 157 yards, 2 TD
Marshall	Receiving	Corey Gammage	7 receptions, 100 yards, 1 TD
Bowling Green	Passing	Matt McDonald	27/45, 282 yards, 4 TD
Bowling Green	Rushing	PaSean Wimberly	5 carries, 35 yards
Bowling Green	Receiving	Odieu Hilliare	4 receptions, 79 yards, 2 TD

=== At Troy ===
Game Four – Marshall Thundering Herd (2–1) at Troy Trojans (1–2)

Quarter	1	2	3	4	Total
Thundering Herd	0	0	7	0	7
Trojans	10	0	0	6	16

at Veterans Memorial Stadium • Troy, Alabama

- Date: Saturday, September 24, 2022
- Game time: 7:00 p.m. EDT
- Game weather: Clear • Temperature: 82 °F (28 °C) • Wind: W 4 mph
- Game attendance: 27,514
- Referee: Wayne Winkler
- TV announcers (NFLN): Jason Ross Jr. (play-by-play), Tyoka Jackson (analyst)

Game information

First quarter

- (10:51) TROY – Buddha Jones 23 yards fumble return, Brooks Buce kick (Troy 7–0)
- (5:31) TROY – Brooks Buce 40 yard field goal (Drive: 6 plays, 68 yards, 2:10; Troy 10–0)

Third quarter

- (4:25) MRSH – Khalan Laborn 14 yard run, Rece Verhoff kick (Drive: 2 plays, 16 yards, 0:37; Troy 10–7)

Fourth quarter

- (7:43) TROY – Brooks Buce 25 yard field goal (Drive: 5 plays, 69 yards, 1:41; Troy 13–7)
- (3:18) TROY – Brooks Buce 28 yard field goal (Drive: 5 plays, 64 yards, 3:11; Troy 16–7)

Statistics	MRSH	TROY
First downs	15	13
Plays–yards	69–174	56–421
Rushes–yards	48–96	31–100
Passing yards	78	321
Passing: comp–att–int	11–21–0	15–25–1
Time of possession	30:56	29:04

Team	Category	Player	Statistics
Marshall	Passing	Henry Colombi	8/13, 49 yards
Marshall	Rushing	Khalan Laborn	29 carries, 113 yards, 1 TD
Marshall	Receiving	Caleb McMillan	3 receptions, 37 yards
Troy	Passing	Gunnar Watson	15/25, 321 yards, 1 INT
Troy	Rushing	DK Billingsley	14 carries, 85 yards
Troy	Receiving	Tez Johnson	2 receptions, 121 yards

=== Gardner–Webb ===
Game Five – Gardner–Webb Runnin' Bulldogs (1–3) at Marshall Thundering Herd (2–2)

Quarter	1	2	3	4	Total
Runnin' Bulldogs	7	0	0	0	7
Thundering Herd	7	7	7	7	28

at Joan C. Edwards Stadium • Huntington, West Virginia

- Date: Saturday, October 1, 2022
- Game time: 3:30 p.m. EDT
- Game weather: Rain • Temperature: 54 °F (12 °C) • Wind: N/A
- Game attendance: 19,845
- Referee: Scott Jackson
- TV announcers (ESPN+): Chad Bush (play-by-play), Doug Chapman (analyst)

Game information

First quarter

- (9:30) MRSH – A.J. Turner 24 yard pass from Henry Colombi, Rece Verhoff kick (Drive: 7 plays, 41 yards, 2:40; Marshall 7–0)
- (3:03) GWU – Ty Anderson 45 yard interception return, Jay Billingsly kick (Tied 7–7)

Second quarter

- (5:48) MRSH – Corey Gammage 10 yard pass from Henry Colombi, Rece Verhoff kick (Drive: 6 plays, 57 yards, 2:59; Marshall 14–7)

Third quarter

- (11:09) MRSH – Khalan Laborn 1 yard run, Rece Verhoff kick (Drive: 10 plays, 67 yards, 3:13; Marshall 21–7)

Fourth quarter

- (8:11) MRSH – Khalan Laborn 78 yard run, Rece Verhoff kick (Drive: 1 play, 78 yards, 0:12; Marshall 28-7)

Statistics	GWU	MRSH
First downs	8	21
Plays–yards	51–143	86–421
Rushes–yards	19–19	53–236
Passing yards	124	185
Passing: comp–att–int	11–32–3	21–33–1
Time of possession	21:34	38:26

Team	Category	Player	Statistics
Gardner–Webb	Passing	Bailey Fisher	9/28, 114 yards, 3 INT
Gardner–Webb	Rushing	Donovan Jones	4 carries, 37 yards
Gardner–Webb	Receiving	Deland Thomas	2 receptions, 49 yards
Marshall	Passing	Henry Colombi	13/20, 138 yards, 2 TD, 1 INT
Marshall	Rushing	Khalan Laborn	35 carries, 191 yards, 2 TD
Marshall	Receiving	Charles Montgomery	5 receptions, 72 yards

=== Louisiana ===
Game Six – Louisiana Ragin' Cajuns (2–3) at Marshall Thundering Herd (3–2)

Quarter	1	2	3	4	Total
Ragin' Cajuns	3	0	13	7	23
Thundering Herd	0	7	0	6	13

at Joan C. Edwards Stadium • Huntington, West Virginia

- Date: Wednesday, October 12, 2022
- Game time: 7:30 p.m. EDT
- Game weather: Sunny
- Game attendance: 19,905
- Referee: Marshall Lewis
- TV announcers (ESPN2): Mike Morgan (play-by-play), Aaron Murray (analyst)

Game information

First quarter

- (7:03) UL – Kenneth Almendares 42 yard field goal (Drive: 8 plays, 55 yards, 2:38; Louisiana 3–0)

Second quarter

- (4:09) MRSH – Khalan Laborn 1 yard run, Rece Verhoff kick (Drive: 10 plays, 87 yards, 5:26; Marshall 7–3)

Third quarter

- (10:30) UL – Dontae Fleming 6 yard pass from Ben Wooldridge, Kenneth Almendares kick (Drive: 7 plays, 60 yards, 2:40, Louisiana 10–7)
- (4:44) UL – Kenneth Almendares 33 yard field goal (Drive: 8 plays, 61 yards, 3:06; Louisiana 13–7)
- (0:00) UL – Kenneth Almendares 52 yard field goal (Drive: 6 plays, 14 yards, 2:11; Louisiana 16–7)

Fourth quarter

- (9:59) UL – Michael Jefferson 32 yard pass from Ben Wooldridge, Kenneth Almendares kick (Drive: 7 plays, 66 yards, 2:30; Louisiana 23–7)
- (6:52) MRSH – Khalan Laborn 1 yard run, Two-point conversion failed (Drive: 9 plays, 75 yards, 3:07; Louisiana 23–13)

Statistics	UL	MRSH
First downs	16	17
Plays–yards	63–338	66–276
Rushes–yards	34–108	44–139
Passing yards	230	137
Passing: comp–att–int	17–29–0	16–22–1
Time of possession	28:18	31:42

Team	Category	Player	Statistics
Louisiana	Passing	Ben Wooldridge	17/29, 230 yards, 2 TD
Louisiana	Rushing	Ben Wooldridge	10 carries, 45 yards
Louisiana	Receiving	Michael Jefferson	3 receptions, 71 yards, 1 TD
Marshall	Passing	Cam Fancher	7/9, 69 yards
Marshall	Rushing	Khalan Laborn	26 carries, 120 yards, 2 TD
Marshall	Receiving	Corey Gammage	4 receptions, 58 yards

=== At James Madison ===
Game Seven – Marshall Thundering Herd (3–3) at James Madison Dukes (5–1)

Quarter	1	2	3	4	Total
Thundering Herd	2	7	10	7	26
Dukes	12	0	0	0	12

at Bridgeforth Stadium • Harrisonburg, Virginia

- Date: Saturday, October 22, 2022
- Game time: 3:30 p.m. EDT
- Game weather: Sunny • Temperature: 67 °F (19 °C) • Wind: NE 3 mph
- Game attendance: 26,159
- Referee: Trennis Livingston
- TV announcers (ESPN+): Curt Dudley (play-by-play), Vad Lee (analyst)

Game information

First quarter

- (7:07) JMU – Camden Wise 35 yard field goal (Drive: 7 plays, 61 yards, 2:12; James Madison 3–0)
- (3:24) JMU – Zach Horton 17 yard pass from Billy Atkins (Drive: 1 play, 17 yards, 0:06; James Madison 9–0)
- (3:24) MRSH – E. J. Jackson 85 yard PAT return (James Madison 9–2)
- (1:07) JMU – Camden Wise 25 yard field goal (Drive: 5 plays, 40 yards, 1:46; James Madison 12–2)

Second quarter

- (9:54) MRSH – Khalan Laborn 61 yard run, Rece Verhoff kick (Drive: 4 plays, 84 yards, 1:11; James Madison 12–9)

Third quarter

- (13:17) MRSH – Corey Gammage 57 yard pass from Cam Fancher, Rece Verhoff kick (Drive: 1 play, 57 yards, 0:10; Marshall 16–12)
- (8:10) MRSH – Rece Verhoff 38 yard field goal (Drive: 4 plays, 6 yards, 1:18; Marshall 19–12)

Fourth quarter

- (4:07) MRSH – Khalan Laborn 18 yard run, Rece Verhoff kick (Drive: 2 plays, 20 yards, 0:49; Marshall 26–12)

Statistics	MRSH	JMU
First downs	12	10
Plays–yards	75–326	72–247
Rushes–yards	44–167	37–83
Passing yards	159	164
Passing: comp–att–int	15–31–2	13–35–4
Time of possession	31:34	28:26

Team	Category	Player	Statistics
Marshall	Passing	Cam Fancher	15/31, 159 yards, 1 TD, 2 INT
Marshall	Rushing	Khalan Laborn	30 carries, 151 yards, 2 TD
Marshall	Receiving	Corey Gammage	5 receptions, 107 yards, 1 TD
James Madison	Passing	Billy Atkins	13/35, 164 yards, 1 TD, 4 INT
James Madison	Rushing	Percy Agyei-Obese	20 carries, 96 yards
James Madison	Receiving	Terrance Greene Jr.	3 receptions, 66 yards

=== Coastal Carolina ===
Game Eight – Coastal Carolina Chanticleers (6–1) at Marshall Thundering Herd (4–3)

Quarter	1	2	3	4	Total
Chanticleers	21	0	0	3	24
Thundering Herd	0	10	3	0	13

at Joan C. Edwards Stadium • Huntington, West Virginia

- Date: Saturday, October 29, 2022
- Game time: 7:00 p.m. EDT
- Game weather: Sunny
- Game attendance: 24,954
- Referee: Ted Pitts
- TV announcers (NFLN): Jason Ross Jr. (play-by-play), Tyoka Jackson (analyst)

Game information

First quarter

- (9:52) CCU – Grayson McCall 2 yard run, Kade Hensley kick (Drive: 11 plays, 76 yards, 5:02; Coastal Carolina 7–0)
- (4:23) CCU – Bryce Carpenter 3 yard run, Kade Hensley kick (Drive: 7 plays, 49 yards, 3:49; Coastal Carolina 14–0)
- (1:03) CCU – Jacob Jenkins 37 yard pass from Grayson McCall, Kade Hensley kick (Drive: 4 plays, 65 yards, 2:03; Coastal Carolina 21–0)

Second quarter

- (7:17) MRSH – Khalan Laborn 2 yard run, Rece Verhoff kick (Drive: 6 plays, 75 yards, 2:06; Coastal Carolina 21–7)
- (4:23) MRSH – Rece Verhoff 40 yard field goal (Drive: 8 plays, 45 yards, 1:58; Coastal Carolina 21–10)

Third quarter

- (2:49) MRSH – Rece Verhoff 39 yard field goal (Drive: 9 plays, 44 yards, 3:03; Coastal Carolina 21–13)

Fourth quarter

- (11:28) CCU – Kade Hensley 27 yard field goal (Drive: 9 plays, 27 yards, 3:42; Coastal Carolina 24–13)

Statistics	CCU	MRSH
First downs	21	20
Plays–yards	69–271	74–407
Rushes–yards	45–150	37–87
Passing yards	121	320
Passing: comp–att–int	13–24–0	19–37–0
Time of possession	35:00	25:00

Team	Category	Player	Statistics
Coastal Carolina	Passing	Grayson McCall	13/24, 121 yards, 1 TD
Coastal Carolina	Rushing	Reese White	6 carries, 43 yards
Coastal Carolina	Receiving	Jared Brown	6 receptions, 57 yards
Marshall	Passing	Cam Fancher	19/36, 320 yards
Marshall	Rushing	Khalan Laborn	16 carries, 59 yards, 1 TD
Marshall	Receiving	Corey Gammage	8 receptions, 187 yards

=== At Old Dominion ===
Game Nine – Marshall Thundering Herd (4–4) at Old Dominion Monarchs (3–5)

Quarter	1	2	3	4	Total
Thundering Herd	0	6	3	3	12
Monarchs	0	0	0	0	0

at S.B. Ballard Stadium • Norfolk, Virginia

- Date: Saturday, November 5, 2022
- Game time: 2:00 p.m. EDT
- Game weather: Sunny • Temperature: 77 °F (25 °C) • Wind: NW 4 mph
- Game attendance: 18,327
- Referee: Scott Broadway
- TV announcers (ESPN+): Chip Tarkenton (play-by-play), Andy Mashaw (analyst)

Game information

Second quarter

- (13:48) MRSH – Rece Verhoff 33 yard field goal (Drive: 14 plays, 76 yards, 6:28; Marshall 3–0)
- (10:35) MRSH – Rece Verhoff 26 yard field goal (Drive: 5 plays, 14 yards, 2:24; Marshall 6–0)

Third quarter

- (8:39) MRSH – Rece Verhoff 30 yard field goal (Drive: 9 plays, 63 yards, 3:59; Marshall 9–0)

Fourth quarter

- (10:50) MRSH – Rece Verhoff 23 yard field goal (Drive: 6 plays, 22 yards, 3:24; Marshall 12–0)

Statistics	MRSH	ODU
First downs	20	13
Plays–yards	81–387	60–209
Rushes–yards	56–298	14–11
Passing yards	89	198
Passing: comp–att–int	13–25–2	24–46–1
Time of possession	38:11	21:49

Team	Category	Player	Statistics
Marshall	Passing	Cam Fancher	13/25, 89 yards, 2 INT
Marshall	Rushing	Khalan Laborn	31 carries, 139 yards
Marshall	Receiving	EJ Horton	4 receptions, 28 yards
Old Dominion	Passing	Hayden Wolff	24/46, 198 yards, 1 INT
Old Dominion	Rushing	Blake Watson	10 carries, 28 yards
Old Dominion	Receiving	Javon Harvey	4 receptions, 60 yards

=== Appalachian State ===
Game Ten – Appalachian State Mountaineers (5–4) at Marshall Thundering Herd (5–4)

Quarter	1	2	3	4	Total
Mountaineers	0	7	7	7	21
Thundering Herd	7	7	14	0	28

at Joan C. Edwards Stadium • Huntington, West Virginia

- Date: Saturday, November 12, 2022
- Game time: 3:30 p.m. EST
- Game weather: Sunny
- Game attendance: 24,312
- Referee: Jeremy Parker
- TV announcers (ESPN+): Chad Bush (play-by-play), Doug Chapman (analyst)

Game information

First quarter

- (8:09) MRSH – Khalan Laborn 1 yard run, Rece Verhoff kick (Drive: 15 plays, 80 yards, 6:45; Marshall 7–0)

Second quarter

- (7:12) MRSH – Jayden Harrison 5 yard pass from Cam Fancher, Rece Verhoff kick (Drive: 9 plays, 80 yards, 4:02; Marshall 14–0)
- (1:00) APP – Daetrich Harrington 1 yard run, Michael Hughes kick (Drive: 10 plays, 32 yards, 5:15; Marshall 14–7)

Third quarter

- (11:00) MRSH – Danisus Miller 0 yard return of blocked punt, Rece Verhoff kick (Marshall 21–7)
- (10:47) APP – Milan Tucker 96 yard kickoff return, Michael Hughes kick (Marshall 21–14)
- (7:57) MRSH – Corey Gammage 19 yard pass from Cam Fancher, Rece Verhoff kick (Drive: 8 plays, 82 yards, 2:41; Marshall 28–14)

Fourth quarter

- (14:55) APP – Henry Pearson 14 yard pass from Chase Brice, Michael Hughes kick (Drive: 9 plays, 50 yards, 3:00; Marshall 28–21)

Statistics	APP	MRSH
First downs	17	17
Plays–yards	74–293	66–341
Rushes–yards	40–116	37–121
Passing yards	177	220
Passing: comp–att–int	15–34–1	17–29–1
Time of possession	31:49	28:11

Team	Category	Player	Statistics
Appalachian State	Passing	Chase Brice	15/34, 177 yards, 1 TD, 1 INT
Appalachian State	Rushing	Nate Noel	18 carries, 72 yards
Appalachian State	Receiving	Christian Horn	4 receptions, 66 yards
Marshall	Passing	Cam Fancher	16/28, 225 yards, 2 TD, 1 INT
Marshall	Rushing	Khalan Laborn	18 carries, 53 yards, 1 TD
Marshall	Receiving	Charles Montgomery	5 receptions, 109 yards

=== At Georgia Southern ===
Game Eleven – Marshall Thundering Herd (6–4) at Georgia Southern Eagles (5–5)

Quarter	1	2	3	4	Total
Thundering Herd	6	14	3	0	23
Eagles	3	7	0	0	10

at Paulson Stadium • Statesboro, Georgia

- Date: Saturday, November 19, 2022
- Game time: 6:00 p.m. EST
- Game weather: Cloudy • Temperature: 52 °F (11 °C) • Wind: 0 mph
- Game attendance: 16,153
- Referee: Trennis Livingston
- TV announcers (ESPN+): Danny Waugh (play-by-play), Cole Neely (anaylst), Emily Grace McWhorter (sideline)

Game information

First quarter

- (13:39) MRSH – EJ Horton 65 yard pass from Cam Fancher, Rece Verhoff kick failed (Drive: 4 plays, 75 yards, 1:21; Marshall 6–0)
- (4:31) GASO – Alex Raynor 46 yard field goal (Drive: 7 plays, 67 yards, 2:58; Marshall 6–3)

Second quarter

- (9:31) MRSH – Shadeed Ahmed 33 yard pass from Cam Fancher, Rece Verhoff kick (Drive: 7 plays, 64 yards, 2:22; Marshall 13–3)
- (7:04) MRSH – Cam Fancher 19 yard run, Rece Verhoff kick (Drive: 5 plays, 57 yards, 1:20; Marshall 20–3)
- (2:16) GASO – Khaleb Hood 27 yard pass from Kyle Vantrease, Alex Raynor kick (Drive: 8 plays, 85 yards, 2:23; Marshall 20–10)

Third quarter

- (7:40) MRSH – Rece Verhoff 36 yard field goal (Drive: 15 plays, 65 yards, 5:23; Marshall 23–10)

Statistics	MRSH	GASO
First downs	29	20
Plays–yards	86–529	64–384
Rushes–yards	54–255	24–179
Passing yards	274	205
Passing: comp–att–int	17–32–0	22–40–1
Time of possession	36:54	23:06

Team	Category	Player	Statistics
Marshall	Passing	Cam Fancher	17/32, 274 yards, 2 TD
Marshall	Rushing	Rasheen Ali	16 carries, 79 yards
Marshall	Receiving	EJ Horton	2 receptions, 76 yards, 1 TD
Georgia Southern	Passing	Kyle Vantrease	22/39, 205 yards, 1 TD, 1 INT
Georgia Southern	Rushing	Jalen White	13 carries, 143 yards
Georgia Southern	Receiving	Jeremy Singleton	8 receptions, 73 yards

=== Georgia State ===
Game Twelve – Georgia State Panthers (4–7) at Marshall Thundering Herd (7–4)

Quarter	1	2	3	4	Total
Panthers	7	3	7	6	23
Thundering Herd	0	14	0	14	28

at Joan C. Edwards Stadium • Huntington, West Virginia

- Date: Saturday, November 26, 2022
- Game time: 12:00 p.m. EST
- Game weather: Sunny
- Game attendance: 17,427
- Referee: Scott Broadway
- TV announcers (ESPN+): Chad Bush (play-by-play), Doug Chapman (analyst)

Game information

First quarter

- (11:57) GSU – Tucker Gregg 3 yard run, Michael Hayes kick (Drive: 6 plays, 75 yards, 3:03; Georgia State 7–0)

Second quarter

- (7:47) GSU – Michael Hayes 39 yard field goal (Drive: 13 plays, 73 yards, 4:53; Georgia State 10–0)
- (5:25) MRSH – Khalan Laborn 83 yard run, Rece Verhoff kick (Drive: 1 play, 83 yards, 0:13; Georgia State 10–7)
- (1:25) MRSH – Rasheen Ali 5 yard pass from Cam Fancher, Rece Verhoff kick (Drive: 7 plays, 52 yards, 3:00; Marshall 14–10)

Third quarter

- (8:52) GSU – Jamari Thrash 12 yard pass from Darren Grainger, Michael Hayes kick (Drive: 13 plays, 67 yards, 4:48; Georgia State 17–14)

Fourth quarter

- (10:09) MRSH – Charles Montgomery 32 yard pass from Cam Fancher, Rece Verhoff kick (Drive: 5 plays, 76 yards, 1:02; Marshall 21–17)
- (5:31) MRSH – Khalan Laborn 1 yard run, Rece Verhoff kick (Drive: 5 plays, 39 yards, 2:42; Marshall 28–17)
- (3:25) GSU – Marcus Carroll 2 yard run, Darren Grainger pass failed (Drive: 5 plays, 75 yards, 1:46; Marshall 28–23)

Statistics	GSU	MRSH
First downs	19	25
Plays–yards	69–365	69–486
Rushes–yards	43–74	41–278
Passing yards	291	208
Passing: comp–att–int	19–26–0	18–28–0
Time of possession	29:47	30:13

Team	Category	Player	Statistics
Georgia State	Passing	Darren Grainger	19/26, 291 yards, 1 TD
Georgia State	Rushing	Marcus Carroll	11 carries, 25 yards, 1 TD
Georgia State	Receiving	Jamari Thrash	9 receptions, 155 yards, 1 TD
Marshall	Passing	Cam Fancher	18/28, 208 yards, 2 TD
Marshall	Rushing	Rasheen Ali	16 carries, 102 yards
Marshall	Receiving	Corey Gammage	4 receptions, 65 yards

=== vs UConn ===
Myrtle Beach Bowl – Marshall Thundering Herd (8–4) vs UConn Huskies (6–6)

Quarter	1	2	3	4	Total
Thundering Herd	14	7	7	0	28
Huskies	0	0	14	0	14

at Brooks Stadium • Conway, South Carolina

- Date: Monday, December 19, 2022
- Game time: 2:30 p.m. EST
- Game weather: Sunny • Temperature: 49 °F (9 °C) • Wind: N 6 mph
- Game attendance: 12,023
- Referee: Ron Hudson
- TV announcers (ESPN): Mike Morgan (play-by-play), Eric Mac Lain (analyst), and Tera Talmadge (sideline)

Game information

First quarter

- (11:15) MRSH – Corey Gammage 9 yard pass from Cam Fancher, Rece Verhoff kick (Drive: 2 plays, 16 yards, 0:32; Marshall 7–0)
- (3:23) MRSH – Damion Barber 34 yard interception return, Rece Verhoff kick (Marshall 14–0)

Second quarter

- (7:05) MRSH – Devin Miller 10 yard pass from Cam Fancher, Rece Verhoff kick (Drive: 4 plays, 73 yards, 1:20; Marshall 21–0)

Third quarter

- (9:51) MRSH – Rasheen Ali 2 yard run, Rece Verhoff kick (Drive: 10 plays, 79 yards, 4:05; Marshall 28–0)
- (5:35) UCONN – Victor Rosa 14 yard run, Noe Ruelas kick (Drive: 9 plays, 75 yards, 4:16; Marshall 28–7)
- (0:01) UCONN – Victor Rosa 24 yard run, Noe Ruelas kick (Drive: 4 plays, 40 yards, 1:55; Marshall 28–14)

Statistics	MRSH	UConn
First downs	19	18
Plays–yards	65–303	67–316
Rushes–yards	45–210	38–144
Passing yards	93	172
Passing: comp–att–int	10–20–1	11–30–3
Time of possession	28:39	31:21

Team	Category	Player	Statistics
Marshall	Passing	Cam Fancher	10/20, 93 yards, 2 TD, 1 INT
Marshall	Rushing	Rasheen Ali	15 carries, 92 yards, 1 TD
Marshall	Receiving	Corey Gammage	3 receptions, 50 yards, 1 TD
UConn	Passing	Zion Turner	9/27, 166 yards, 3 INT
UConn	Rushing	Victor Rosa	16 carries, 75 yards, 2 TD
UConn	Receiving	Keelan Marion	2 receptions, 69 yards

== Staff ==
Name	Position	Consecutive season at Marshall
Charles Huff	Head coach	2nd
Clint Trickett	Offensive coordinator/quarterbacks coach	1st (2nd overall)
Lance Guidry	Defensive coordinator/safeties coach	2nd
Johnathan Galante	Special Teams Coordinator	1st
Bill Legg	Assistant head coach/tight ends coach	2nd
Jovon Bouknight	Pass game coordinator/Wide receivers coach	1st
Telly Lockette	Run Game coordinator/running backs coach	2nd
Chevis Jackson	Cornerbacks coach	1st
Shannon Morrison	Linebackers coach	2nd
Eddy Morrissey	offensive line coach	2nd
Ralph Street	Defensive line coach	2nd
Support staff
Sharrod Everett	Football Chief of Staff	2nd
Ben Ashford	Director of Sports Performance	2nd
Will Rankin	Assistant strength & conditioning coach	1st
Scottie Ethington	Assistant strength & conditioning coach	1st
Mark Gale	Assistant athletic director of football operations	2nd (32nd overall)
Luke Haker	Assistant director of football operations	2nd
Doug Chapman	Senior analyst/director of player development	2nd
Mike Bartrum	Senior analyst/special assistant to the head coach	2nd
Marc Votteler	General manager	1st
Katelyn Lambert	Director of on-campus recruiting	1st
Jack Lanham	Assistant director of player personnel	1st
