= Blake Barnett =

American football player (born 1995)

No. 11
- Position: Quarterback

Personal information
- Born: December 24, 1995 (age 30); San Bernardino County, California, U.S.
- Listed height: 6 ft 5 in (1.96 m)
- Listed weight: 201 lb (91 kg)

Career information
- High school: Corona (CA) Santiago
- College: Alabama (2015–2016); Arizona State (2017); South Florida (2018–2019)

Blake Austin Barnett (born December 24, 1995) is an American former football quarterback for the South Florida Bulls football team. He previously played college football for the Alabama Crimson Tide and the Arizona State Sun Devils.

== Early life ==
Barnett attended Santiago High School in Corona, California. He played football for Santiago High School and was rated as a five-star recruit and was ranked among the top players in his class. He committed to the University of Alabama to play college football under head coach Nick Saban.

During his high school career, Barnett threw for 5,921 yards on 419 passes. He led the Santiago Sharks to round 2 of the CIF playoffs where they faced Upland high. Barnett and the Sharks came up short losing 29-30, ending his high school career.

== College career ==
Barnett redshirted his first year at Alabama in 2015. Barnett entered his redshirt freshman season in 2016 as Alabama's starting quarterback, but lost the job to true freshman Jalen Hurts before halftime of the opening game against the USC Trojans.

On September 28, 2016, AL.com’s Matt Zenitz reported that Barnett had left the team and decided to transfer to another school. On December 5, 2016, Barnett announced his transfer to Arizona State University. Prior to transferring to ASU, Barnett immediately enrolled at Palomar College, which made him eligible to play for the Sun Devils in 2017. However, he was expected to be ineligible for the first four games of the 2017 season because he transferred from Alabama after four games into the 2016 season. Barnett appealed to the NCAA for immediate eligibility and on January 31, 2017, the NCAA ruled in favor.

After being cleared to play immediately by the NCAA, Barnett was expected to be a strong contender to start right away at Arizona State, but incumbent starter Manny Wilkins won and held on to his job. Barnett attempted only five passes during the 2017 season as the backup quarterback. In 2018, under new head coach Herm Edwards, Barnett was spending most sessions during the spring battling Dillon Sterling-Cole for the backup quarterback job behind Wilkins. On April 25, 2018, it was reported that Barnett intended to transfer from Arizona State. He reportedly informed the school of his decision soon after the spring game on April 13.

On May 8, 2018, it was reported that Barnett was transferring to the University of South Florida. On May 18, 2018, USF announced the addition of Barnett as a graduate transfer.

=== Statistics ===
Season	Team	Games			Passing								Rushing			
Season	Team	GP	GS	Record	Comp	Att	Pct	Yards	Avg	TD	Int	Rate	Att	Yards	Avg	TD
2015	Alabama	Redshirt														
2016	Alabama	3	1	1–0	11	19	57.9	219	11.5	2	0	189.5	7	-17	-2.4	0
2017	Arizona State	3	0	–	3	5	60.0	40	8.0	0	1	87.2	1	-3	-3.0	0
2018	South Florida	11	10	7–3	214	350	61.1	2,705	7.7	12	11	131.1	108	306	2.8	8
2019	South Florida	4	3	0–3	40	77	51.9	434	5.6	4	2	111.2	23	63	2.7	0
Career		21	14	8–6	268	451	59.4	3,398	7.5	18	14	129.7	139	349	2.5	8
