= Cheez-It Bowl =

The Cheez-It Bowl is the name of multiple college football bowl games formerly sponsored by Cheez-It:

- Cheez-It Bowl (2018–2019), played in Arizona in 2018 and 2019, currently branded as the Cactus Bowl
- Cheez-It Bowl (2020–2022), played in Florida from 2020 through 2022, currently branded as the Pop-Tarts Bowl
- Citrus Bowl, played in Florida, known as the Cheez-It Citrus Bowl from 2023 to 2025
