= Rasheen Ali =

American football player (born 2001)

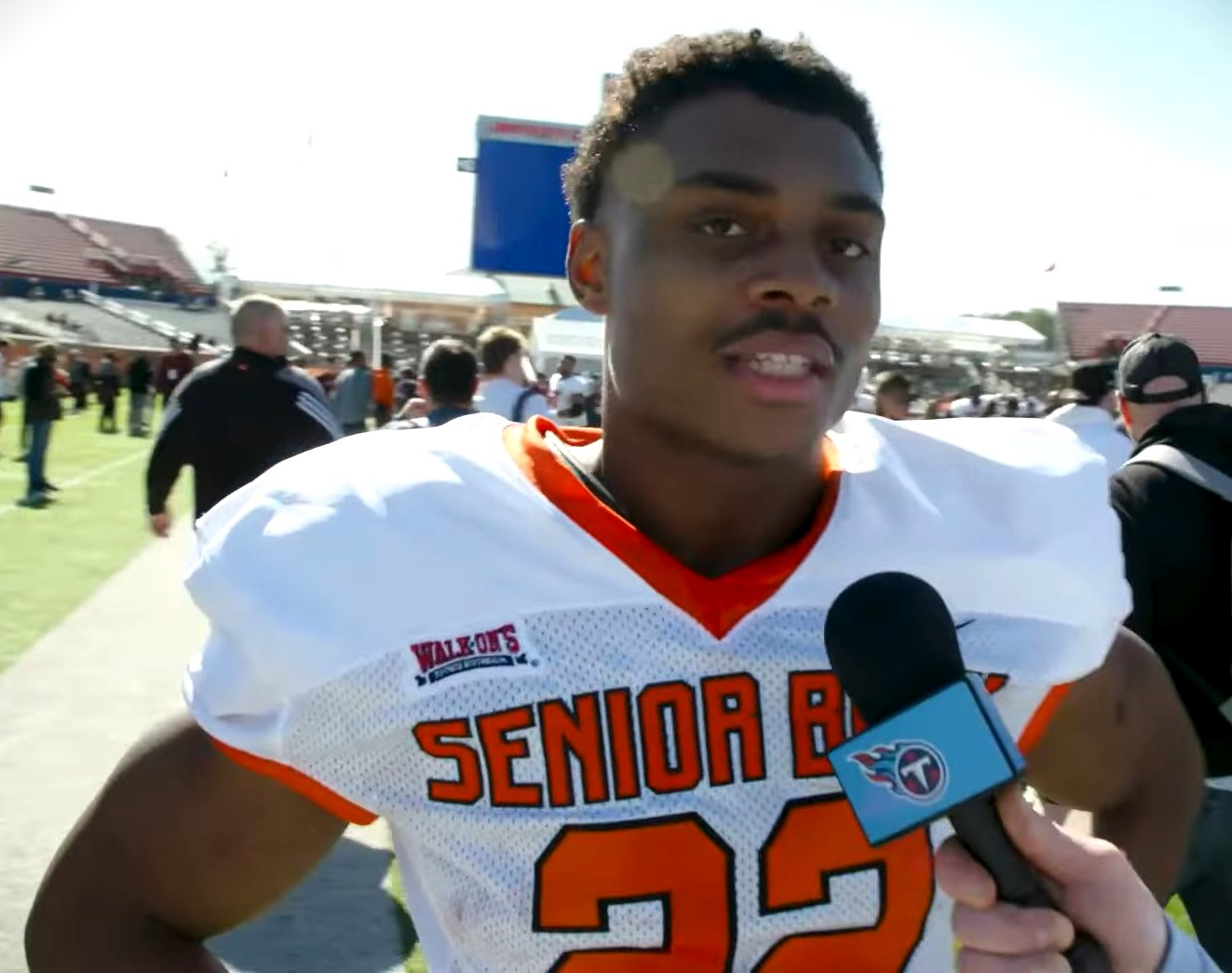
- Ali at the Senior Bowl in 2024

No. 26 – Baltimore Ravens
- Positions: Running back, kickoff returner
- Roster status: Active

Personal information
- Born: February 16, 2001 (age 25); Cleveland, Ohio, U.S.
- Listed height: 5 ft 11 in (1.80 m)
- Listed weight: 210 lb (95 kg)

Career information
- High school: Shaker Heights (Shaker Heights, Ohio)
- College: Marshall (2020–2023)
- NFL draft: 2024: 5th round, 165th overall pick

Career history
- Baltimore Ravens (2024–present)

Awards and highlights
- First-team All-C-USA (2021); Second-team All-Sun Belt (2023)

Career NFL statistics as of Week 8, 2026
- Rushing yards: 79
- Rushing average: 3.4
- Receptions: 9
- Receiving yards: 68
- Receiving touchdowns: 1
- Return yards: 1,149
- Stats at Pro Football Reference

Rasheen Ali (born February 16, 2001) is an American professional football running back and kickoff returner for the Baltimore Ravens of the National Football League (NFL). He played college football for the Marshall Thundering Herd and was selected by the Ravens in the fifth round of the 2024 NFL draft.

== Early life ==
Ali grew up in Cleveland, Ohio and attended Shaker Heights High School in Shaker Heights, Ohio. He was rated a three-star recruit and committed to play college football at Marshall over an offer from Hampton.

== College career ==
Ali played in six games during his true freshman season in 2020 where he logged 22 rushing yards on five carries along with 76 kick return yards.

During the 2021 season, he became one of the nation's premier running backs and finished with 1,401 yards and 23 touchdowns on 250 carries. By the end of the season, he was named on the Maxwell Football Club's Freshman of the Year Watch List, the Team MVP, an All-Conference USA First Team selection, and a FWAA Freshman All-American.

During the 2022 season, he sat out for most of the season due to an injury leading to a medical redshirt. He came back for the last three games and finished the season with 273 rushing yards and a touchdown. He was named the MVP of the 2022 Myrtle Beach Bowl, where he had 92 rushing yards and a touchdown on 15 carries. By the end of the season, he was named on the Doak Walker Award Watch List and the Maxwell Award Watch List. During the 2022 offseason, Ali ran for the Thundering Herd track team.

During the 2023 season, Ali ran for 180 yards and two touchdowns during the Week 4 game against Virginia Tech to take the win against them. Because of his performance, he was named the Sun Belt Conference Offensive Player of the Week. To close the 2023 season, he was selected for the 2024 Senior Bowl, though he ruptured his biceps tendon in the Senior Bowl practices in the days preceding the game and was thus unable to play in the game itself.

== Professional career ==
Pre-draft measurables
Height	Weight	Arm length	Hand span	Wingspan
5 ft 11 1/4 in (1.81 m)	206 lb (93 kg)	31 1/4 in (0.79 m)	8 5/8 in (0.22 m)	6 ft 2 3/8 in (1.89 m)
All values from NFL Combine

Ali was selected by the Baltimore Ravens in the fifth round (165th overall) in the 2024 NFL draft. He was placed on injured reserve on September 5 due to a neck injury. He was activated on October 12 and made his NFL debut exclusively on special teams in Week 6 against the Washington Commanders.

In Week 11 of his second season, Ali's role expanded to include first-team plays against the Cincinnati Bengals, in which he caught his first targeted pass for 15 yards. In Week 15 against the Bengals, Ali recorded his first career touchdown on a 30–yard reception from Lamar Jackson.

== Career statistics ==
=== NFL ===
Legend
**Bold**	Career high

==== Regular season ====
Year	Team	Games		Rushing					Receiving					Returning					Fumbles	
Year	Team	GP	GS	Att	Yds	Avg	Lng	TD	Rec	Yds	Avg	Lng	TD	Ret	Yds	Avg	Lng	TD	Fum	Lost
2024	BAL	6	0	**10**	**31**	3.1	**9**	0	—	—	—	—	—	4	107	**26.8**	38	**0**	0	0
2025	BAL	**15**	0	7	24	**3.4**	**9**	0	**9**	**68**	**7.6**	**30**	**1**	**30**	**763**	25.4	**43**	**0**	0	0
Career		21	0	17	55	3.2	9	0	9	68	7.6	30	1	34	870	25.6	43	0	0	0

=== College ===
Legend
	Led the FBS
**Bold**	Career high

Year	Team	Games		Rushing					Receiving					Returning				
Year	Team	GP	GS	Att	Yds	Avg	Lng	TD	Rec	Yds	Avg	Lng	TD	Ret	Yds	Avg	Lng	TD
2020	Marshall	6	0	5	22	4.4	9	0	—	—	—	—	—	**4**	76	19.0	27	0
2021	Marshall	**13**	**13**	**250**	**1401**	5.6	63	**23**	**46**	**342**	7.4	50	**1**	1	**97**	**97.0**	**97**	**1**
2022	Marshall	3	0	47	273	**5.8**	38	1	2	10	5.0	5	**1**	—	—	—	—	—
2023	Marshall	12	12	212	1135	5.4	**64**	15	28	213	**7.6**	**65**	**1**	—	—	—	—	—
Career		34	25	514	2831	5.5	64	39	76	565	7.4	65	3	5	173	34.6	97	1
