= Mike Morgan (sportscaster) =

American sportscaster

Mike Morgan is an American sportscaster for ESPN calling football, basketball and baseball games. Morgan has called games for ESPN for over 15 years and is one of the primary voices of the SEC Network as well. Morgan has also called NFL on national radio for several years, NBA games for the Atlanta Hawks, and MLB for the Atlanta Braves. Morgan also calls the college football game of the week for Elite Media Network and cohosts the college football podcast "JC&Morgan".

Before ESPN, Morgan called college football for FOX television for four years as well as CSS. While calling South Carolina Gamecock games on TV and Radio, Morgan won the NSMA Sportscaster of the Year award 5 times.

== Football ==
He calls college football for Elite Media Network and NFL games on Compass Media Networks. He was the television voice of the South Carolina Gamecocks football and was the preseason voice of the Carolina Panthers. Morgan has also called several college football bowl games on national radio for ESPN Radio and Compass Media Networks, including the Outback Bowl, Vegas Bowl, Peach Bowl, and Cheez-It Bowl.

== Personal life ==
He currently resides in Atlanta, Georgia.
