= Justin Joly =

American football player (born 2004)

- Joly in 2025

No. 80 – Miami Dolphins
- Position: Tight end
- Roster status: Active

Personal information
- Born: July 9, 2004 (age 22)
- Listed height: 6 ft 3 in (1.91 m)
- Listed weight: 241 lb (109 kg)

Career information
- High school: Iona Prep (New Rochelle, New York)
- College: UConn (2022–2023); NC State (2024–2025)
- NFL draft: 2026: 5th round, 152nd overall pick

Career history
- Denver Broncos (2026)*; Miami Dolphins (2026–present)
- * Offseason or practice squad member only

Awards and highlights
- First-team All-ACC (2025)

Career NFL statistics as of Week 3, 2026
- Games played: 1
- Stats at Pro Football Reference

Justin Joly (JOE-lee; born July 9, 2004) is an American professional football tight end for the Miami Dolphins of the National Football League (NFL). He played college football for the UConn Huskies and NC State Wolfpack. Joly was selected by the Denver Broncos in the fifth round of the 2026 NFL draft.

== Early life ==
Joly attended Iona Preparatory School in New Rochelle, New York. During his high school career he had 123 receptions for 1,827 yards and 22 total touchdowns. He committed to the University of Connecticut to play college football.

== College career ==
As a true freshman at UConn in 2022, he played in 12 games and had 18 receptions for 250 yards and two touchdowns. As a sophomore in 2023, he led the team with 56 receptions for 578 yards and two touchdowns. After the season, he entered the transfer portal and transferred to NC State University.

Joly made an immediate impact at NC State, finishing with 43 catches for 661 yards and four touchdowns while averaging 15.4 yards per reception, fourth among all FBS tight ends. He was named to the Mackey Award preseason watch list ahead of that first season in Raleigh.

As a senior in 2025, Joly posted career highs in receptions (49) and touchdowns (seven, tying the NC State program record) and earned first-team All-ACC honors.

He capped his college career by winning Tight End MVP at the 2026 Senior Bowl.

== Professional career ==
Pre-draft measurables
| Height | Weight | Arm length | Hand span | Wingspan | 20-yard shuttle | Vertical jump | Broad jump |
|---|---|---|---|---|---|---|---|
| 6 ft 3 1/2 in (1.92 m) | 241 lb (109 kg) | 32 1/4 in (0.82 m) | 10 1/2 in (0.27 m) | 6 ft 7 3/8 in (2.02 m) | 4.65 s | 30.5 in (0.77 m) | 9 ft 6 in (2.90 m) |
All values from NFL Combine/Pro Day

=== Denver Broncos ===
Joly was selected by the Denver Broncos in the fifth round (152nd overall) of the 2026 NFL draft. On May 7, 2026, Joly signed his four-year rookie contract. On August 30, he was waived by the Broncos as a part of final roster cuts.

=== Miami Dolphins ===
On August 31, 2026, Joly was claimed off waivers by the Miami Dolphins.
