= 2022 Cure Bowl =

Postseason college football bowl game

2022 Duluth Trading Cure Bowl
- 8th Cure Bowl
UTSA Roadrunners	Troy Trojans
(11–2)	(11–2)
C-USA	Sun Belt
12	18
Head coach: Jeff Traylor	Head coach: Jon Sumrall
AP / Coaches / CFP; 22 / 22 / 25	AP / Coaches / CFP; 23 / 24 / 24
	1	2	3	4	Total
UTSA	2	10	0	0	12
Troy	0	7	8	3	18
- Date: December 16, 2022
- Season: 2022
- Stadium: Exploria Stadium
- Location: Orlando, Florida
- MVP: KJ Robertson (LB, Troy)
- Favorite: UTSA by 1
- Referee: Christian Watson (Mountain West)
- Attendance: 11,911
- Payout: US$573,125

United States TV coverage
- Network: ESPN
- Announcers: Beth Mowins (play-by-play), Kirk Morrison (analyst), and Stormy Buonantony (sideline)

International TV coverage
- Network: ESPN Deportes and ESPN Brazil
- Announcers: ESPN Brazil: Matheus Pinheiro (play-by-play) and Weinny Eirado (analyst)

The 2022 Cure Bowl was a college football bowl game played on December 16, 2022, at Exploria Stadium in Orlando, Florida. The eighth annual Cure Bowl, the game featured the UTSA Roadrunners of Conference USA and the Troy Trojans of the Sun Belt Conference. The game began at 3:07 p.m. EST and aired on ESPN. It was one of the 2022–23 bowl games concluding the 2022 FBS football season. Sponsored by workwear company Duluth Holdings Inc. through their Duluth Trading Company brand, it was officially known as the Duluth Trading Cure Bowl.

Both offenses started slowly, as the teams traded punts on each of their opening drives and Troy lost a fumble on their second. The scoring opened with a safety after a Troy snap—which the quarterback was not expecting—went through the back of the end zone; UTSA's resulting possession gave the first touchdown of the game with a pass from quarterback Frank Harris to wide receiver Zakhari Franklin. After several more punts, UTSA placekicker Jared Sackett added a field goal to increase the Roadrunners' lead to twelve points, though this was cut to five following a Troy touchdown with under a minute remaining in the first half. Offenses continued to underperform in the second half; each of UTSA's first three possessions in the third quarter resulted in turnovers. Troy scored a 12-yard passing touchdown late in the quarter to take their first lead, and extended it to six points with a short field goal on their next drive. A turnover on downs from the Troy 3-yard-line and another from the Troy 42-yard-line for UTSA concluded their afternoon, securing an 18–12 win for Troy.

== Teams ==
Based on conference tie-ins, the game usually features teams from the Mid-American Conference and the Sun Belt Conference; however, this season's matchup featured a team from Conference USA. This was the first game between Troy and UTSA, and marked the first appearance by both teams in the Cure Bowl. Since both UTSA and Troy won their respective conference championships, the Cure Bowl was the only bowl game of the season to be scheduled between two conference champions. (Note: Since SEC champion Georgia and Big Ten champion Michigan were selected for separate College Football Playoff semifinals, they could have advanced and met in the 2023 College Football Playoff National Championship. That possibility was eliminated when TCU, which had lost the Big 12 Championship Game to Kansas State, defeated Michigan in the Fiesta Bowl.)

=== UTSA ===
The UTSA Roadrunners, representing Conference USA (C–USA), began their season with a triple-overtime contest against No. 24 Houston, ultimately coming up two points short. Another overtime game followed, with UTSA defeating Army to earn their first win. The Roadrunners split their following two games, with a loss at No. 21 Texas and a victory over FCS Texas Southern at home. Their nonconference schedule complete, the Roadrunners began their C–USA slate with a road clash against Middle Tennessee, a fifteen point win. A three-point win against Western Kentucky and a twenty-point win at FIU followed, leading UTSA into their homecoming contest against the North Texas Mean Green. The Roadrunners were victorious by a margin of four points, earning them their sixth win and bowl eligibility as a result. Following a bye week, the Roadrunners began November with another overtime game—their third of the season—as they took down UAB in double overtime. Wins over Louisiana Tech and Rice followed, and UTSA closed out their regular season at home with a three-point victory over the UTEP Miners, after overcoming a 24-point deficit they faced in the game's second quarter. The Roadrunners finished the regular season on a nine-game win streak, dating to September 24, and won the Conference USA regular season championship and a bid to the conference title game the following week. There, they defeated North Texas in a rematch by three touchdowns, earning the program's second overall and consecutive conference championship. UTSA entered the game with a record of 11–2 and a perfect 8–0 mark in conference play and ranked No. 22 in both the AP Poll and Coaches Poll; they finished No. 25 in the College Football Playoff rankings.

This was UTSA's final game as a member of Conference USA, as the Roadrunners are set to join the American Athletic Conference in 2023.

=== Troy ===
The Troy Trojans, representing the Sun Belt Conference kicked off their 2022 campaign with a road game at Ole Miss, which they lost by 18 points. They rebounded with a three-touchdown win over FCS Alabama A&M in their home opener before falling to Appalachian State on a last-second Hail Mary in a game visited by College GameDay. Troy hosted new conference members Marshall the following week, whom they beat at home by nine points, before another non-conference game on the road the following week with a seven-point win at Western Kentucky. The Trojans kept it up with back-to-back home wins, as they defeated Southern Miss by seventeen and Texas State by three. Their last game in October was a Thursday night contest at rivals South Alabama, a four-point win for Troy. Following a bye week, the Trojans traveled to Louisiana, whom they defeated by a touchdown after overcoming a 17-point deficit, before returning home to host Army in their final non-conference game, which they won by one point. They closed out their regular season with a pair of wins, at home against Louisiana–Monroe and on the road against Arkansas State. They finished the regular season atop the Sun Belt West Division, and as conference regular season champions, earning them the right to host the conference championship game against Coastal Carolina. The Trojans defeated Coastal by nineteen points, earning them a conference championship. They accepted their bid to the Cure Bowl on December 4, 2022. Troy entered the game with an 11–2 record, and a mark of 7–1 in Sun Belt play; they were ranked No. 23 by the AP Poll and No. 24 by both the Coaches' and College Football Playoff rankings prior to the contest.

== Game summary ==
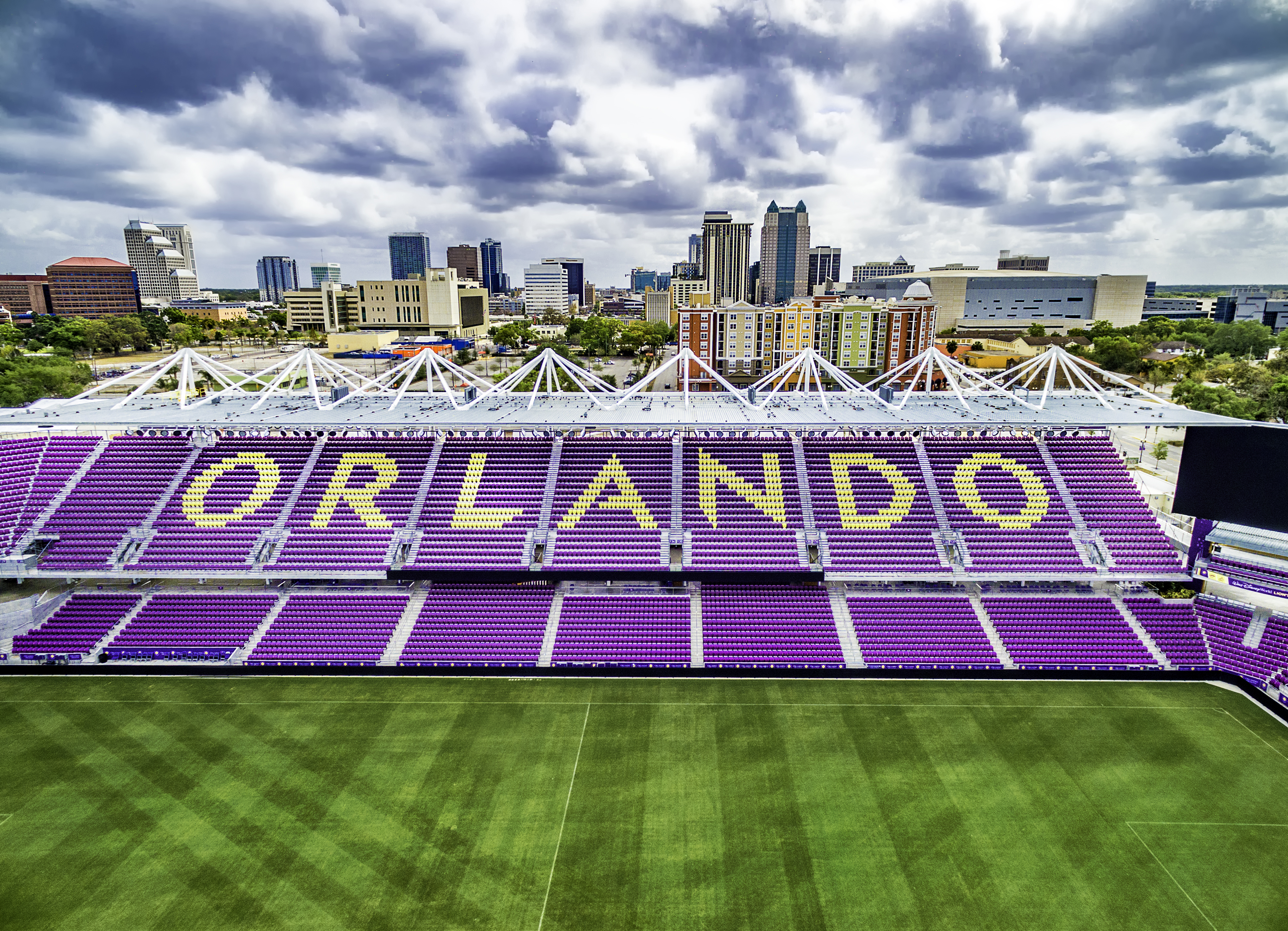
Exploria Stadium in Orlando, pictured in 2017, hosted the game.

The Cure Bowl was televised by ESPN, with a commentary team of Beth Mowins, Kirk Morrison, and Stormy Buonantony. The game's officiating crew, from the Mountain West Conference, was led by referee Christian Watson and umpire Ian Malepleai. The game was played at Exploria Stadium in Orlando, Florida, and weather at kickoff was sunny with a temperature of 66 °F (19 °C).

=== First half ===
Scheduled for a 3:00 p.m. EST kickoff, the Cure Bowl began at 3:07 p.m. with Jared Sackett's kickoff and Jarris Williams's return to the Troy 22-yard-line. The Trojans began the game with a 3-yard pass and a 1-yard rush, but they were unable to convert third down and went three-and-out as a result. Starting their first drive at their own 35-yard-line, UTSA earned a first down with a 5-yard pass on their second play, but faced 3rd & 3 on their next set of downs. Quarterback Frank Harris connected with wide receiver Zakhari Franklin for a 9-yard gain, earning UTSA another first down, but they stalled following a sack by Troy's Shakel Brown and an incomplete pass on third down. The Roadrunners were forced to punt on 4th & 12, though they were able to down the ball on the Troy 3-yard-line. Troy escaped their disadvantageous field position with a 29-yard pass from Gunnar Watson to RaJae' Johnson, but their offense gained four yards on their next three plays and the Trojans punted on 4th & 6. UTSA's Chris Carpenter muffed the punt but recovered it himself at the UTSA 19-yard-line. The Roadrunners' ensuing drive ended similarly, with a first down gained on their second play and a three-and-out from there; a false start penalty on third down set them back to a fourth-and-long situation. The UTSA special teams was able to down the punt inside the 5-yard-line for the second time, as Troy had to begin their third drive of the game on their own 4-yard-line. After their first two plays gained a net total of three yards, the UTSA defense earned a safety on third down after the snap went past Watson, who was not expecting it, and through the back of the end zone. This gave UTSA a 2–0 lead and possession of the ball, which they took at their own 25-yard-line. The Roadrunners reached midfield in four plays, earning two first downs, and converted a 3rd & 3 with a 10-yard Harris-to-Franklin pass with 90 seconds remaining. A 4-yard rush by Kevorian Barnes two plays later put them inside the red zone before the clock expired, putting an end to the game's first quarter.

UTSA began the second quarter with a third down conversion, as Harris completed a pass to Chris Carpenter at the Troy 15-yard-line. Harris and Carpenter connected again on 3rd & 4 several plays later, putting the ball on the 2-yard-line, and Harris found Franklin in the end zone for a touchdown pass. This increased UTSA's lead to nine points following Sackett's successful extra point. After a holding penalty on the ensuing kickoff return set the ball back to the Troy 6-yard-line, Troy's offense was not able to advance the ball following a 4-yard rush by Kimani Vidal on first down, and they were forced to punt. Mike Rivers's kick was fair caught at the UTSA 43-yard-line and the Roadrunners gained eight yards in three plays. Lucas Dean punted on 4th & 2 and the kick was again downed inside the ten as the Trojans' Tez Johnson completed a fair catch of his own at the Troy 8-yard-line. Watson found Johnson for a 9-yard completion on Troy's next play, but back-to-back sacks by UTSA's Trey Moore set them back six and eight yards, respectively, and prompted a punt which went out-of-bounds at the Troy 31-yard-line. A 3-yard rush by Barnes and two rushes totaling 4 yards by Harris set up 4th & 3 for the Roadrunners, and Sackett made a 42-yard field goal to make the score 12–0 in favor of UTSA. A return on the ensuing kickoff put the ball on the Troy 20-yard-line. The Trojans twice faced third downs on their next sequence of plays, and both were converted by defensive penalties; a pass interference penalty on the first and holding on the second. The latter advanced the ball to the Troy 47-yard-line, and DK Billingsley rushed for 13 yards on the next play to enter UTSA territory. After a Roadrunner timeout, Watson was sacked for a loss of 7, but Vidal rushed for 11 yards on the next play to set up 3rd & 6. On that play, Watson's pass was intercepted by UTSA's Clifford Chattman, but he fumbled on his return and the ball was recovered again by Troy at the UTSA 13-yard-line. The Trojans took advantage and scored with fifty seconds remaining in the half on a 2-yard rush by Vidal, cutting their deficit to five points. After a touchback and an incomplete pass, Harris's second down pass was intercepted by Richard Jibunor and returned to the UTSA 39-yard-line. On Troy's final possession of the half, they threw an interception in the end zone for a touchback; UTSA took a knee to take their five-point lead into halftime.

=== Second half ===
Brooks Buce kicked off to begin the second half and UTSA started their first possession of the third quarter on their own 31-yard-line. A pair of rushes by Barnes and Harris have them a first down, but the drive ended abruptly on its fourth play when Harris was sacked by Jibunor who also managed to force a fumble and recover it himself on the UTSA 34-yard-line. Troy was unable to capitalize, though, as their drive began with two rushes from Vidal, both for a loss of one yard, followed by two incomplete passes by Watson, the latter of which gave the ball back to UTSA on downs. UTSA got a first down immediately through Barnes, and they earned another two plays later with a Harris pass to Tykee Ogle-Kellogg for nine yards. After a 2-yard rush, UTSA committed another turnover as Keyshawn Swanson forced and recovered a fumble from Oscar Cardenas following a reception, giving Troy the ball back on their own 29-yard-line. A sack on first down for a loss of five points put the Trojans behind the sticks early, and they were unable to climb out of that hole, as they went three-and-out and punted on 4th & 12. Rivers's punt was fair caught on the UTSA 26-yard-line. A 20-yard pass from Harris to Dan Dishman began the Roadrunners' ensuing series, but they soon after found themselves facing 4th & 1 near midfield. Harris converted this with a 2-yard rush, and UTSA were able to earn first downs on their next two plays as well. The second of these took them inside the red zone to the Troy 11-yard-line, and they had reached the 9-yard-line by third down. On that third down play, Harris's pass was intercepted by KJ Robertson, who returned the pass 61 yards to the UTSA 37-yard-line; a personal foul after the play advanced the ball a further fifteen yards to the 22-yard-line. This good field position benefitted Troy, as they completed a pair of passes and converted a third-and-short with Vidal before Watson found RaJae' Johnson for a 12-yard touchdown pass, giving Troy their first lead of the game. The Trojans opted to attempt a two-point conversion, which was successful. Following a touchback and a 4-yard rush on first down, UTSA's next drive was doomed by a pair of incomplete passes, as UTSA punted after only 45 seconds of possession and gave Troy the ball at their own 19-yard-line. A 3rd & 3 early on was converted by virtue of a Watson pass to Deshon Stoudemire for an 8-yard gain, though DK Billingsley lost three yards on a rush the next play; that play would end the third quarter, with Troy leading 15–12.

Troy started the fourth quarter facing 2nd & 13 from their own 31-yard-line, and worked their way up to 4th & 2 in their next two plays; they converted fourth down with a 4-yard Vidal rush. Watson passed to Johnson for 13 yards on their next play, putting them into UTSA territory, but a loss of 6 yards on the ensuing first down put them in a hole. They faced another 4th & 2 a few plays later, but an unsportsmanlike conduct penalty was called against UTSA's Asyrus Simon before the play could be run, giving Troy an automatic first down at the UTSA 18-yard-line. A Vidal rush for 9 yards after an incomplete pass set up 3rd & 1, but Vidal lost yardage and the Trojans had to settle for a 27-yard field goal, which was successfully kicked by Brooks Buce to increase their lead to six points with nine minutes to play. Buce then kicked a touchback and UTSA started on their own 25-yard-line; after a Harris-to-Cardenas pass to give them a first down and a 3-yard rush by Harris on the next play, a 53-yard rush by Barnes advanced the ball to the Troy 3-yard-line, where UTSA now faced 1st & Goal needing a touchdown and made extra point to take the lead. A Barnes rush for 2 yards put them on the 3-yard-line, but three consecutive incomplete passes by Harris—the first intended for Carpenter and both of the last two intended for Franklin—doomed the Roadrunners to a turnover on downs. Rushes of 5, 9, 3, and 11 yards on Troy's next four plays got the ball out of their own red zone, but a sack by Joe Evans for a loss of 6 yards several plays later forced a Troy punt with 2:41 left on the clock. The kick was returned to the UTSA 31-yard-line by Carpenter, and UTSA quickly crossed midfield with a 26-yard Harris-to-Cardenas completion. After the Roadrunners gained only one total yard on their next three plays, they were forced to attempt another fourth down conversion, and this one was also unsuccessful. Troy resumed possession at their own 39-yard-line and was able to exhaust the remainder of UTSA's timeouts before lining up in victory formation to run out the rest of the clock. The game ended with a final score of Troy 18, UTSA 12, at 6:47 p.m. EST, after a total duration of three hours and 39 minutes.

=== Scoring summary ===
2022 Duluth Trading Cure Bowl

Quarter	1	2	3	4	Total
No. 25 UTSA	2	10	0	0	12
No. 24 Troy	0	7	8	3	18

at Exploria Stadium • Orlando, Florida

- Date: Friday, December 16, 2022
- Game time: 3:00 p.m. EST
- Game weather: Sunny • Temperature: 66 °F (19 °C) • Wind: 4 mph (6.4 km/h) north
- Referee: Christian Watson
- TV announcers (ESPN): Beth Mowins (play-by-play), Kirk Morrison (analyst), and Stormy Buonantony (sideline)
- Box score

Scoring summary

Quarter	Time	Drive			Team	Scoring information	Score	
Quarter	Time	Plays	Yards	TOP	Team	Scoring information	UTSA	Troy
1	3:58				UTSA	Troy snap fumbled through the back of the end zone for a safety	2	0
2	12:30	15	75	6:28	UTSA	Zakhari Franklin 2-yard touchdown reception from Frank Harris, Jared Sackett kick good	9	0
2	6:21	4	7	1:41	UTSA	42-yard field goal by Jared Sackett	12	0
2	0:50	2	13	0:47	Troy	Kimani Vidal 2-yard touchdown run, Brooks Buce kick good	12	7
3	2:43	5	22	2:28	Troy	RaJae' Johnson 12-yard touchdown reception from Gunnar Watson, 2-point pass good	12	15
4	9:18	15	71	7:40	Troy	27-yard field goal by Brooks Buce	12	18
"TOP" = time of possession. For other American football terms, see Glossary of American football.							12	18

== Statistics ==
Team statistical comparison
Statistic	UTSA	Troy
First downs	21	16
First downs rushing	6	5
First downs passing	14	5
First downs penalty	1	6
Third down efficiency	3–12	3–13
Fourth down efficiency	1–3	1–2
Total plays–net yards	74–345	64–169
Rushing attempts–net yards	32–147	40–56
Yards per rush	4.6	1.4
Yards passing	198	113
Pass completions–attempts	23–42	13–24
Interceptions thrown	2	2
Punt returns–total yards	2–13	1–0
Kickoff returns–total yards	0–0	3–22
Punts–average yardage	4–46.8	6–43.3
Fumbles–lost	4–3	1–0
Penalties–yards	8–89	2–21
Time of possession	20:16	32:15

UTSA statistics
Roadrunners passing
	C–A	Yds	TD–INT
Frank Harris	23–42	194	1–2
Roadrunners rushing
	Car	Yds	TD
Kevorian Barnes	22	138	0
Frank Harris	9	14	0
Chris Carpenter	1	2	0
TEAM	1	−1	0
Roadrunners receiving
	Rec	Yds	TD
Oscar Cardenas	5	62	0
Chris Carpenter	7	59	0
Zakhari Franklin	8	36	1
Dan Dishman	1	20	0
Kevorian Barnes	1	12	0
Tykee Ogle-Kellogg	1	9	0

Troy statistics
Trojans passing
	C–A	Yds	TD–INT
Gunnar Watson	13–23	113	1–2
Tez Johnson	0–1	0	0–0
Trojans rushing
	Car	Yds	TD
Kimani Vidal	21	72	1
DK Billingsley	9	15	0
TEAM	5	−18	0
Gunnar Watson	7	−29	0
Trojans receiving
	Rec	Yds	TD
RaJae' Johnson	2	41	1
Tez Johnson	4	40	0
Deshon Stoudemire	3	16	0
Kimani Vidal	2	7	0
Clayton Ollendieck	1	6	0
Michael Vice	1	3	0
