= 2022 Louisiana Tech Bulldogs football team =

American college football season

2022 Louisiana Tech Bulldogs football
- Conference: Conference USA
- Record: 3–9 (2–6 C-USA)
- Head coach: Sonny Cumbie (1st season)
- Co-offensive coordinators: Jake Brown (1st season); Scott Parr (1st season)
- Offensive scheme: Spread
- Defensive coordinator: Scott Power (1st season)
- Base defense: 4–3
- Home stadium: Joe Aillet Stadium

2022 Conference USA football standings
	Conf.			Overall
Team	W		L	W		L
UTSA y$	8	–	0	11	–	3
Western Kentucky	6	–	2	9	–	5
North Texas y	6	–	2	7	–	7
Middle Tennessee	4	–	4	8	–	5
UAB	4	–	4	7	–	6
Florida Atlantic	4	–	4	5	–	7
Rice	3	–	5	5	–	8
UTEP	3	–	5	5	–	7
FIU	2	–	6	4	–	8
Charlotte	2	–	6	3	–	9
Louisiana Tech	2	–	6	3	–	9
Championship: UTSA 48, North Texas 27
$ – Conference champion; y – Championship game participant; Rankings from AP Poll

The 2022 Louisiana Tech Bulldogs football team represented Louisiana Tech University as a member of Conference USA (C-USA) during the 2022 NCAA Division I FBS football season. They were led by first year head coach Sonny Cumbie. The Bulldogs played their home games at Joe Aillet Stadium in Ruston, Louisiana.

== Offseason ==
=== Coaching changes ===
On November 30, Texas Tech offensive coordinator and quarterbacks coach Sonny Cumbie was hired as the Bulldogs' new head coach. At the time of his hiring by Louisiana Tech, Cumbie was also serving as Texas Tech's interim head coach. Cumbie initially split time between the two programs, coaching the Red Raiders in the Liberty Bowl.

== Preseason ==
=== C-USA media day ===
The Conference USA media day was held on July 27 at Globe Life Field in Arlington, Texas. The Bulldogs were represented by head coach Sonny Cumbie, offensive lineman Joshua Mote, and defensive lineman Keive Rose. The Bulldogs were predicted to finish ninth in the conference's preseason poll.

== Schedule ==
Louisiana Tech and Conference USA announced the 2022 football schedule on March 30, 2022.

Date	Time	Opponent	Site	TV	Result	Attendance
September 1	7:00 p.m.	at Missouri*	Faurot Field; Columbia, MO	ESPNU	L 24–52	47,653
September 10	6:00 p.m.	No. 18 (FCS) Stephen F. Austin*	Joe Aillet Stadium; Ruston, LA	ESPN3	W 52–17	16,094
September 17	8:00 p.m.	at No. 5 Clemson*	Memorial Stadium; Clemson, SC	ACCN	L 20–48	80,542
September 24	6:00 p.m.	at South Alabama*	Hancock Whitney Stadium; Mobile, AL	ESPN+	L 14–38	17,939
October 8	6:00 p.m.	UTEP	Joe Aillet Stadium; Ruston, LA	ESPN+	W 41–31	16,375
October 15	4:00 p.m.	at North Texas	Apogee Stadium; Denton, TX	ESPN+	L 27–47	16,590
October 22	2:00 p.m.	Rice^{†}	Joe Aillet Stadium; Ruston, LA	ESPN+	L 41–42 ^{OT}	18,300
October 28	7:00 p.m.	at FIU	Riccardo Silva Stadium; Westchester, FL	CBSSN	L 34–42 ^{2OT}	12,478
November 5	2:00 p.m.	Middle Tennessee	Joe Aillet Stadium; Ruston, LA	ESPN+	W 40–24	14,298
November 12	2:30 p.m.	at UTSA	Alamodome; San Antonio, TX	ESPN+	L 7–51	25,409
November 19	2:30 p.m.	at Charlotte	Jerry Richardson Stadium; Charlotte, NC	ESPN3/ESPN+	L 21–26	7,905
November 26	2:30 p.m.	UAB	Joe Aillet Stadium; Ruston, LA	CBSSN	L 27–37	10,342
*Non-conference game; ^{†}Homecoming; Rankings from AP Poll (and CFP Rankings, after November 1) - Released prior to game; All times are in Central time

== Game summaries ==
=== At Missouri ===
	1	2	3	4	Total
Bulldogs	3	7	0	14	24
Tigers	0	24	14	14	52

Statistics	LT	MIZ
First downs	19	28
Total yards	347	558
Rushing yards	11	323
Passing yards	336	235
Turnovers	3	2
Time of possession	28:28	31:32

Team	Category	Player	Statistics
Louisiana Tech	Passing	Matthew Downing	20/35, 194 yards, TD, 3 INT
Louisiana Tech	Rushing	Marquis Crosby	7 rushes, 23 yards
Louisiana Tech	Receiving	Cyrus Allen	5 receptions, 121 yards, 2 TD
Missouri	Passing	Brady Cook	18/27, 201 yards, TD, INT
Missouri	Rushing	Nathaniel Peat	8 rushes, 72 yards, TD
Missouri	Receiving	Dominic Lovett	6 receptions, 76 yards

=== No. 18 (FCS) Stephen F. Austin ===
	1	2	3	4	Total
No. 18 (FCS) Lumberjacks	7	0	3	7	17
Bulldogs	21	17	14	0	52

Statistics	SFA	LT
First downs	17	25
Total yards	305	516
Rushing yards	144	300
Passing yards	161	216
Turnovers	3	1
Time of possession	28:06	31:54

Team	Category	Player	Statistics
Stephen F. Austin	Passing	Trae Self	9/22, 82 yards
Stephen F. Austin	Rushing	Trae Self	8 rushes, 39 yards, TD
Stephen F. Austin	Receiving	Lawton Rikel	4 receptions, 75 yards, TD
Louisiana Tech	Passing	Parker McNeil	11/23, 197 yards, 3 TD, INT
Louisiana Tech	Rushing	Marquis Crosby	16 rushes, 197 yards, 2 TD
Louisiana Tech	Receiving	Tre Harris	4 receptions, 72 yards, TD

=== At No. 5 Clemson ===
	1	2	3	4	Total
Bulldogs	0	6	0	14	20
No. 5 Tigers	10	3	21	14	48

Statistics	LT	CLEM
First downs	14	25
Total yards	317	521
Rushing yards	6	280
Passing yards	311	241
Turnovers	4	1
Time of possession	28:36	31:24

Team	Category	Player	Statistics
Louisiana Tech	Passing	Parker McNeil	23/42, 311 yards, TD, 2 INT
Louisiana Tech	Rushing	Charvis Thornton	4 rushes, 9 yards
Louisiana Tech	Receiving	Griffin Hebert	5 receptions, 122 yards
Clemson	Passing	DJ Uiagalelei	17/29, 221 yards, 2 TD
Clemson	Rushing	Will Shipley	12 rushes, 139 yards, 2 TD
Clemson	Receiving	Antonio Williams	2 receptions, 57 yards, TD

=== At South Alabama ===
	1	2	3	4	Total
Bulldogs	0	7	0	7	14
Jaguars	14	3	14	7	38

Statistics	LT	USA
First downs	17	23
Total yards	308	389
Rushing yards	57	175
Passing yards	251	214
Turnovers	5	1
Time of possession	31:09	28:51

Team	Category	Player	Statistics
Louisiana Tech	Passing	Parker McNeil	19/34, 251 yards, 2 TD, 4 INT
Louisiana Tech	Rushing	Greg Garner	7 receptions, 51 yards
Louisiana Tech	Receiving	Tre Harris	6 receptions, 85 yards
South Alabama	Passing	Carter Bradley	14/21, 178 yards, 3 TD, INT
South Alabama	Rushing	La'Damian Webb	14 rushes, 75 yards
South Alabama	Receiving	Caullin Lacy	3 receptions, 40 yards, TD

=== UTEP ===
	1	2	3	4	Total
Miners	3	7	0	21	31
Bulldogs	20	10	0	11	41

Statistics	UTEP	LT
First downs	27	18
Total yards	501	380
Rushing yards	181	114
Passing yards	320	266
Turnovers	4	2
Time of possession	34:34	25:26

Team	Category	Player	Statistics
UTEP	Passing	Gavin Hardison	23/51, 320 yards, 2 TD, 3 INT
UTEP	Rushing	Ronald Awatt	15 rushes, 66 yards
UTEP	Receiving	Reynaldo Flores	6 receptions, 73 yards
Louisiana Tech	Passing	Parker McNeil	18/27, 266 yards, 4 TD
Louisiana Tech	Rushing	Marquis Crosby	14 rushes, 75 yards
Louisiana Tech	Receiving	Tre Harris	5 receptions, 126 yards, TD

=== At North Texas ===
	1	2	3	4	Total
Bulldogs	3	14	10	0	27
Mean Green	14	13	7	13	47

Statistics	LT	UNT
First downs	22	26
Total yards	504	671
Rushing yards	80	475
Passing yards	424	196
Turnovers	0	1
Time of possession	33:22	25:06

Team	Category	Player	Statistics
Louisiana Tech	Passing	Parker McNeil	26/37, 424 yards, 2 TD
Louisiana Tech	Rushing	Marquis Crosby	9 rushes, 46 yards
Louisiana Tech	Receiving	Smoke Harris	10 receptions, 156 yards
North Texas	Passing	Austin Aune	11/20, 196 yards, 2 TD, INT
North Texas	Rushing	Ayo Adeyi	7 rushes, 122 yards, TD
North Texas	Receiving	Var'Keyes Gumms	4 receptions, 59 yards, TD

=== Rice ===
	1	2	3	4	OT	Total
Owls	0	7	14	14	7	42
Bulldogs	10	0	17	8	6	41

Statistics	RICE	LT
First downs	24	19
Total yards	487	373
Rushing yards	279	144
Passing yards	208	229
Turnovers	3	1
Time of possession	33:22	26:38

Team	Category	Player	Statistics
Rice	Passing	T. J. McMahon	16/27, 208 yards, 3 TD
Rice	Rushing	Cameron Montgomery	14 rushes, 87 yards
Rice	Receiving	Luke McCaffrey	10 receptions, 171 yards, 2 TD
Louisiana Tech	Passing	Matthew Downing	12/24, 159 yards, 2 TD, INT
Louisiana Tech	Rushing	Marquis Crosby	14 rushes, 87 yards
Louisiana Tech	Receiving	Tre Harris	8 receptions, 92 yards, 3 TD

=== At FIU ===
	1	2	3	4	OT	2OT	Total
Bulldogs	10	7	0	10	7	0	34
Panthers	7	14	3	3	7	8	42

Statistics	LT	FIU
First downs	23	23
Total yards	440	378
Rushing yards	184	57
Passing yards	256	321
Turnovers	0	0
Time of possession	33:16	26:44

Team	Category	Player	Statistics
Louisiana Tech	Passing	Landry Lyddy	28/40, 256 yards
Louisiana Tech	Rushing	Marquis Crosby	21 rushes, 115 yards, 2 TD
Louisiana Tech	Receiving	Nate Jones	4 receptions, 72 yards
FIU	Passing	Grayson James	31/48, 321 yards, 3 TD
FIU	Rushing	Lexington Joseph	12 rushes, 37 yards, 2 TD
FIU	Receiving	Rivaldo Fairweather	6 receptions, 89 yards

=== Middle Tennessee ===
	1	2	3	4	Total
Blue Raiders	7	14	0	3	24
Bulldogs	14	13	13	0	40

Statistics	MTSU	LT
First downs	26	18
Total yards	420	446
Rushing yards	194	135
Passing yards	226	311
Turnovers	5	1
Time of possession	29:01	30:59

Team	Category	Player	Statistics
Middle Tennessee	Passing	Chase Cunningham	15/27, 136 yards, TD, 3 INT
Middle Tennessee	Rushing	Frank Peasant	24 rushes, 91 yards
Middle Tennessee	Receiving	Bryce Bailey	3 receptions, 46 yards
Louisiana Tech	Passing	Parker McNeil	14/33, 285 yards, 3 TD, INT
Louisiana Tech	Rushing	Marquis Crosby	24 rushes, 123 yards
Louisiana Tech	Receiving	Tre Harris	7 receptions, 157 yards, 2 TD

=== At UTSA ===
	1	2	3	4	Total
Bulldogs	7	0	0	0	7
Roadrunners	21	13	10	7	51

Statistics	LT	UTSA
First downs	17	29
Total yards	259	484
Rushing yards	112	258
Passing yards	147	226
Turnovers	5	1
Time of possession	27:46	32:14

Team	Category	Player	Statistics
Louisiana Tech	Passing	Landry Lyddy	14/26, 138 yards, TD, 2 INT
Louisiana Tech	Rushing	Charvis Thornton	8 rushes, 48 yards
Louisiana Tech	Receiving	Smoke Harris	4 receptions, 49 yards, TD
UTSA	Passing	Frank Harris	18/26, 216 yards, TD
UTSA	Rushing	Kevorian Barnes	11 rushes, 103 yards, 2 TD
UTSA	Receiving	Joshua Cephus	7 receptions, 81 yards, TD

=== At Charlotte ===
	1	2	3	4	Total
Bulldogs	0	7	0	14	21
49ers	0	13	6	7	26

Statistics	LT	CLT
First downs	19	21
Total yards	350	414
Rushing yards	137	146
Passing yards	213	268
Turnovers	2	0
Time of possession	32:18	27:42

Team	Category	Player	Statistics
Louisiana Tech	Passing	Landry Lyddy	23/31, 213 yards, 2 INT
Louisiana Tech	Rushing	Marquis Crosby	21 rushes, 105 yards, 3 TD
Louisiana Tech	Receiving	Cyrus Allen	3 receptions, 82 yards
Charlotte	Passing	Chris Reynolds	20/30, 268 yards
Charlotte	Rushing	Calvin Camp	11 rushes, 111 yards, 3 TD
Charlotte	Receiving	Taylor Thompson	4 receptions, 99 yards

=== UAB ===
	1	2	3	4	Total
Blazers	0	17	20	0	37
Bulldogs	3	3	14	7	27

Statistics	UAB	LT
First downs	19	22
Total yards	497	467
Rushing yards	406	220
Passing yards	91	247
Turnovers	1	1
Time of possession	28:55	31:05

Team	Category	Player	Statistics
UAB	Passing	Dylan Hopkins	7/14, 91 yards, TD, INT
UAB	Rushing	DeWayne McBride	16 rushes, 272 yards, TD
UAB	Receiving	Trea Shropshire	1 reception, 74 yards, TD
Louisiana Tech	Passing	Jack Turner	15/25, 167 yards, TD, INT
Louisiana Tech	Rushing	Charvis Thornton	8 rushes, 132 yards, TD
Louisiana Tech	Receiving	Tre Harris	6 receptions, 63 yards, TD
