= 2022 FIU Panthers football team =

American college football season

2022 FIU Panthers football
- Conference: Conference USA
- Record: 4–8 (2–6 C-USA)
- Head coach: Mike MacIntyre (1st season)
- Offensive coordinator: David Yost (1st season)
- Offensive scheme: Spread
- Defensive coordinator: Jovan Dewitt (1st season)
- Base defense: Multiple 3–4
- Home stadium: Riccardo Silva Stadium

2022 Conference USA football standings
	Conf.			Overall
Team	W		L	W		L
UTSA y$	8	–	0	11	–	3
Western Kentucky	6	–	2	9	–	5
North Texas y	6	–	2	7	–	7
Middle Tennessee	4	–	4	8	–	5
UAB	4	–	4	7	–	6
Florida Atlantic	4	–	4	5	–	7
Rice	3	–	5	5	–	8
UTEP	3	–	5	5	–	7
FIU	2	–	6	4	–	8
Charlotte	2	–	6	3	–	9
Louisiana Tech	2	–	6	3	–	9
Championship: UTSA 48, North Texas 27
$ – Conference champion; y – Championship game participant; Rankings from AP Poll

The 2022 FIU Panthers football team represented Florida International University (FIU) as a member of Conference USA (C-USA) during the 2022 NCAA Division I FBS football season. Led by first-year head coach Mike MacIntyre, the Panthers compiled an overall record of 4–8 with a mark of 2–6 in conference play, placing in a three-way tie for ninth in C-USA. FIU played home games at Riccardo Silva Stadium in Westchester, Florida,

== Preseason ==
=== C-USA media day ===
The Conference USA media day was held on July 27 at Globe Life Field in Arlington, Texas. The Panthers were represented by head coach Mike MacIntyre, wide receiver Tyrese Chambers, and defensive lineman Davon Strickland. The Panthers were predicted to finish in last place in the conference's preseason poll.

Media poll
Predicted finish	Team
1	UTSA
2	UAB
3	WKU
4	Florida Atlantic
5	North Texas
6	UTEP
7	Charlotte
8	Middle Tennessee
9	Louisiana Tech
10	Rice
11	FIU

== Schedule ==
Date	Time	Opponent	Site	TV	Result	Attendance
September 1	7:00 p.m.	Bryant*	Riccardo Silva Stadium; Westchester, FL	ESPN3	W 38–37 ^{OT}	16,597
September 10	7:00 p.m.	at Texas State*	Bobcat Stadium; San Marcos, TX	ESPN+	L 12–41	18,757
September 24	3:30 p.m.	at Western Kentucky	Houchens Industries–L. T. Smith Stadium; Bowling Green, KY	CBSSN	L 0–73	15,127
October 1	8:00 p.m.	at New Mexico State*	Aggie Memorial Stadium; Las Cruces, NM	FloSports	W 21–7	10,423
October 8	7:00 p.m.	UConn*	Riccardo Silva Stadium; Westchester, FL	ESPN3	L 12–33	16,689
October 14	8:00 p.m.	UTSA	Riccardo Silva Stadium; Westchester, FL	CBSSN	L 10–30	14,122
October 22	3:30 p.m.	at Charlotte	Jerry Richardson Stadium; Charlotte, NC	ESPN3	W 34–15	10,576
October 28	8:00 p.m.	Louisiana Tech	Riccardo Silva Stadium; Westchester, FL	CBSSN	W 42–34 ^{2OT}	12,478
November 5	4:00 p.m.	at North Texas	Apogee Stadium; Denton, TX	ESPN+	L 14–52	22,308
November 12	12:00 p.m.	Florida Atlantic	Riccardo Silva Stadium; Westchester, FL (Shula Bowl)	Stadium	L 7–52	14,674
November 19	4:00 p.m.	at UTEP	Sun Bowl; El Paso, TX	ESPN+	L 6–40	10,758
November 26	6:00 p.m.	Middle Tennessee	Riccardo Silva Stadium; Westchester, FL	ESPN3/ESPN+	L 28–33	14,768
*Non-conference game; Rankings from AP Poll released prior to the game; All times are in Eastern time

== Game summaries ==
=== Bryant ===
	1	2	3	4	OT	Total
Bulldogs	9	7	0	14	7	37
Panthers	0	6	0	24	8	38

Statistics	BRY	FIU
First downs	28	27
Total yards	470	377
Rushing yards	121	67
Passing yards	349	310
Turnovers	1	0
Time of possession	38:18	21:42

Team	Category	Player	Statistics
Bryant	Passing	Zevi Eckhaus	18/22, 243 yards, TD
Bryant	Rushing	Ishod Byarm	19 rushes, 48 yards, 2 TD
Bryant	Receiving	Anthony Frederick	3 receptions, 101 yards, TD
FIU	Passing	Grayson James	16/31, 207 yards, 4 TD
FIU	Rushing	EJ Wilson Jr.	11 rushes, 43 yards
FIU	Receiving	Tyrese Chambers	8 receptions, 86 yards, 2 TD

=== At Texas State ===
	1	2	3	4	Total
Panthers	3	3	0	6	12
Bobcats	10	10	0	21	41

Statistics	FIU	TXST
First downs	18	21
Total yards	313	452
Rushing yards	62	226
Passing yards	251	225
Turnovers	2	2
Time of possession	27:58	32:02

Team	Category	Player	Statistics
FIU	Passing	Grayson James	30/47, 196 yards, 2 INT
FIU	Rushing	EJ Wilson Jr.	6 rushes, 18 yards, TD
FIU	Receiving	Tyrese Chambers	10 receptions, 72 yards
Texas State	Passing	Layne Hatcher	15/30, 226 yards, 3 TD, INT
Texas State	Rushing	Calvin Hill	28 rushes, 195 yards, TD
Texas State	Receiving	Charles Brown	2 receptions, 68 yards, TD

=== At Western Kentucky ===
	1	2	3	4	Total
Panthers	0	0	0	0	0
Hilltoppers	14	28	17	14	73

Statistics	FIU	WKU
First downs	10	32
Total yards	180	688
Rushing yards	56	210
Passing yards	124	478
Turnovers	2	1
Time of possession	30:32	29:28

Team	Category	Player	Statistics
FIU	Passing	Grayson James	13/23, 85 yards
FIU	Rushing	Lexington Joseph	15 rushes, 31 yards
FIU	Receiving	Nate Jefferson	4 receptions, 27 yards
Western Kentucky	Passing	Austin Reed	29/35, 381 yards, 5 TD
Western Kentucky	Rushing	L. T. Sanders	4 rushes, 73 yards, TD
Western Kentucky	Receiving	Malachi Corley	3 receptions, 125 yards, 2 TD

=== At New Mexico State ===
	1	2	3	4	Total
Panthers	7	14	0	0	21
Aggies	0	7	0	0	7

Statistics	FIU	NMSU
First downs	20	14
Total yards	344	221
Rushing yards	162	82
Passing yards	182	139
Turnovers	0	0
Time of possession	30:45	29:15

Team	Category	Player	Statistics
FIU	Passing	Grayson James	13/19, 175 yards, 3 TD
FIU	Rushing	Lexington Joseph	14 rushes, 80 yards
FIU	Receiving	Tyrese Chambers	6 receptions, 72 yards, TD
New Mexico State	Passing	Diego Pavia	8/14, 85 yards
New Mexico State	Rushing	Jamoni Jones	12 rushes, 50 yards
New Mexico State	Receiving	Bryce Childress	5 receptions, 43 yards

=== UConn ===
	1	2	3	4	Total
Huskies	7	13	6	7	33
Panthers	0	0	10	2	12

Statistics	CONN	FIU
First downs	20	17
Total yards	402	409
Rushing yards	295	153
Passing yards	107	256
Turnovers	0	3
Time of possession	34:15	25:45

Team	Category	Player	Statistics
UConn	Passing	Zion Turner	14/19, 102 yards
UConn	Rushing	Devontae Houston	12 rushes, 135 yards
UConn	Receiving	Justin Joly	5 receptions, 62 yards
FIU	Passing	Grayson James	28/43, 256 yards, 2 INT
FIU	Rushing	Lexington Joseph	7 rushes, 103 yards, TD
FIU	Receiving	Jalen Bracey	9 receptions, 75 yards

=== UTSA ===
	1	2	3	4	Total
Roadrunners	0	17	7	6	30
Panthers	0	3	0	7	10

Statistics	UTSA	FIU
First downs	23	19
Total yards	433	323
Rushing yards	130	137
Passing yards	303	186
Turnovers	2	1
Time of possession	27:54	32:06

Team	Category	Player	Statistics
UTSA	Passing	Frank Harris	24/35, 303 yards, 2 TD
UTSA	Rushing	Kevorian Barnes	20 rushes, 128 yards, 2 TD
UTSA	Receiving	Zakhari Franklin	6 receptions, 68 yards, TD
FIU	Passing	Grayson James	18/36, 174 yards, INT
FIU	Rushing	Lexington Joseph	6 rushes, 56 yards
FIU	Receiving	Kris Mitchell	2 receptions, 70 yards

=== At Charlotte ===
	1	2	3	4	Total
Panthers	14	13	7	0	34
49ers	0	0	0	15	15

Statistics	FIU	CLT
First downs	25	21
Total yards	453	337
Rushing yards	147	60
Passing yards	306	277
Turnovers	1	5
Time of possession	34:38	25:22

Team	Category	Player	Statistics
FIU	Passing	Grayson James	26/34, 306 yards, TD, INT
FIU	Rushing	Lexington Joseph	17 rushes, 72 yards, 2 TD
FIU	Receiving	Tyrese Chambers	10 receptions, 143 yards
Charlotte	Passing	Chris Reynolds	23/38, 244 yards, 3 INT
Charlotte	Rushing	Shadrick Byrd	9 rushes, 42 yards
Charlotte	Receiving	Elijah Spencer	6 receptions, 77 yards

=== Louisiana Tech ===
	1	2	3	4	OT	2OT	Total
Bulldogs	10	7	0	10	7	0	34
Panthers	7	14	3	3	7	8	42

Statistics	LT	FIU
First downs	23	23
Total yards	440	378
Rushing yards	184	57
Passing yards	256	321
Turnovers	0	0
Time of possession	33:16	26:44

Team	Category	Player	Statistics
Louisiana Tech	Passing	Landry Lyddy	28/40, 256 yards
Louisiana Tech	Rushing	Marquis Crosby	21 rushes, 115 yards, 2 TD
Louisiana Tech	Receiving	Nate Jones	4 receptions, 72 yards
FIU	Passing	Grayson James	31/48, 321 yards, 3 TD
FIU	Rushing	Lexington Joseph	12 rushes, 37 yards, 2 TD
FIU	Receiving	Rivaldo Fairweather	6 receptions, 89 yards

=== At North Texas ===
	1	2	3	4	Total
Panthers	0	14	0	0	14
Mean Green	24	21	0	7	52

Statistics	FIU	UNT
First downs	12	27
Total yards	258	623
Rushing yards	113	209
Passing yards	145	414
Turnovers	2	3
Time of possession	26:03	33:57

Team	Category	Player	Statistics
FIU	Passing	Grayson James	19/35, 130 yards, 2 INT
FIU	Rushing	Grayson James	4 rushes, 37 yards
FIU	Receiving	Rivaldo Fairweather	1 reception, 39 yards
North Texas	Passing	Austin Aune	25/34, 414 yards, 5 TD, 2 INT
North Texas	Rushing	Stone Earle	11 rushes, 60 yards, TD
North Texas	Receiving	Jyaire Shorter	2 receptions, 92 yards, 2 TD

=== Florida Atlantic ===
	1	2	3	4	Total
Owls	21	10	14	7	52
Panthers	0	7	0	0	7

Statistics	FAU	FIU
First downs	25	14
Total yards	385	277
Rushing yards	281	203
Passing yards	104	74
Turnovers	0	4
Time of possession	32:52	27:08

Team	Category	Player	Statistics
Florida Atlantic	Passing	N'Kosi Perry	14/21, 104 yards, 2 TD
Florida Atlantic	Rushing	Larry McCammon	26 rushes, 104 yards
Florida Atlantic	Receiving	Tony Johnson	2 receptions, 43 yards, TD
FIU	Passing	Grayson James	9/26, 56 yards, 2 INT
FIU	Rushing	Lexington Joseph	11 rushes, 87 yards
FIU	Receiving	Tyrese Chambers	2 receptions, 28 yards

=== At UTEP ===
	1	2	3	4	Total
Panthers	0	0	0	6	6
Miners	14	24	0	2	40

Statistics	FIU	UTEP
First downs	5	29
Total yards	71	525
Rushing yards	15	335
Passing yards	56	190
Turnovers	1	1
Time of possession	18:00	42:00

Team	Category	Player	Statistics
FIU	Passing	Grayson James	6/16, 56 yards, INT
FIU	Rushing	Lexington Joseph	8 rushes, 10 yards
FIU	Receiving	Rivaldo Fairweather	1 reception, 22 yards
UTEP	Passing	Calvin Brownholtz	12/18, 190 yards, 2 TD
UTEP	Rushing	Reynaldo Flores	13 rushes, 128 yards, 2 TD
UTEP	Receiving	Kelly Akharaiyi	3 receptions, 99 yards, TD

=== Middle Tennessee ===
	1	2	3	4	Total
Blue Raiders	6	14	7	6	33
Panthers	0	7	14	7	28

Statistics	MTSU	FIU
First downs	26	24
Total yards	447	497
Rushing yards	168	83
Passing yards	279	414
Turnovers	0	4
Time of possession	34:35	25:25

Team	Category	Player	Statistics
Middle Tennessee	Passing	Chase Cunningham	29/42, 279 yards
Middle Tennessee	Rushing	Darius Bracy	20 rushes, 91 yards, 2 TD
Middle Tennessee	Receiving	Izaiah Gathings	7 receptions, 77 yards
FIU	Passing	Haden Carlson	29/52, 414 yards, 4 TD, 4 INT
FIU	Rushing	EJ Wilson Jr.	6 rushes, 32 yards
FIU	Receiving	Rivaldo Fairweather	8 receptions, 152 yards, 3 TD
