= 2022 Florida Atlantic Owls football team =

American college football season

2022 Florida Atlantic Owls football
- Conference: Conference USA
- Record: 5–7 (4–4 C–USA)
- Head coach: Willie Taggart (3rd season)
- Offensive coordinator: Brent Dearmon (1st season)
- Offensive scheme: Pro spread
- Defensive coordinator: Todd Orlando (1st season)
- Base defense: 3–3–5
- Home stadium: FAU Stadium

2022 Conference USA football standings
	Conf.			Overall
Team	W		L	W		L
UTSA y$	8	–	0	11	–	3
Western Kentucky	6	–	2	9	–	5
North Texas y	6	–	2	7	–	7
Middle Tennessee	4	–	4	8	–	5
UAB	4	–	4	7	–	6
Florida Atlantic	4	–	4	5	–	7
Rice	3	–	5	5	–	8
UTEP	3	–	5	5	–	7
FIU	2	–	6	4	–	8
Charlotte	2	–	6	3	–	9
Louisiana Tech	2	–	6	3	–	9
Championship: UTSA 48, North Texas 27
$ – Conference champion; y – Championship game participant; Rankings from AP Poll

The 2022 Florida Atlantic Owls football team represented Florida Atlantic University as a member of Conference USA (C-USA) during the 2022 NCAA Division I FBS football season. Led by Willie Taggart in this third and final season as head coach, the Owls compiled an overall record of 5–7 with a mark of 4–4 in conference play, placing in a three-way tie for fourth in C-USA. Florida Atlantic played home games at FAU Stadium in Boca Raton, Florida.

During the previous season, on October 21, 2021, Florida Atlantic accepted the invitation to join the American Athletic Conference (AAC) and will become a full member on July 1, 2023. The 2022 season was the program's last as a member of C-USA.

== Preseason ==
=== C-USA media day ===
The Conference USA media day was held on July 27 at Globe Life Field in Arlington, Texas. The Owls were predicted to finish fourth in the conference's preseason poll.

== Schedule ==
Florida Atlantic and Conference USA (C-USA) announced the 2022 football schedule on March 30, 2022.

Date	Time	Opponent	Site	TV	Result	Attendance
August 27	7:00 p.m.	Charlotte	FAU Stadium; Boca Raton, FL	CBSSN	W 43–13	19,571
September 3	6:00 p.m.	at Ohio*	Peden Stadium; Athens, OH	ESPN+	L 38–41	20,003
September 10	6:00 p.m.	No. 21 (FCS) Southeastern Louisiana*	FAU Stadium; Boca Raton, FL	ESPN3	W 42–9	17,532
September 17	7:30 p.m.	UCF*	FAU Stadium; Boca Raton, FL	CBSSN	L 14–40	30,991
September 24	7:30 p.m.	at Purdue*	Ross–Ade Stadium; West Lafayette, IN	BTN	L 26–28	55,137
October 1	4:00 p.m.	at North Texas	Apogee Stadium; Denton, TX	ESPN+	L 28–45	18,274
October 15	6:00 p.m.	Rice^{†}	FAU Stadium; Boca Raton, FL	ESPN+	W 17–14	21,465
October 22	4:00 p.m.	at UTEP	Sun Bowl; El Paso, TX	ESPN+	L 21–24	12,796
October 29	7:00 p.m.	UAB	FAU Stadium; Boca Raton, FL	CBSSN	W 24–17	16,138
November 12	12:00 p.m.	at FIU	Riccardo Silva Stadium; Westchester, FL (Shula Bowl)	Stadium	W 52–7	
November 19	3:30 p.m.	at Middle Tennessee	Johnny "Red" Floyd Stadium; Murfreesboro, TN	ESPN3/ESPN+	L 21–49	9,958
November 26	12:00 p.m.	Western Kentucky	FAU Stadium; Boca Raton, FL	CBSSN	L 31–32 ^{OT}	18,376
*Non-conference game; ^{†}Homecoming; Rankings from AP Poll released prior to the game; All times are in Eastern time

== Game summaries ==
=== Charlotte ===
Charlotte 49ers (0-0) vs. Florida Atlantic Owls (0-0)

Quarter	1	2	3	4	Total
49ers	7	0	6	0	13
Owls	10	16	7	10	43

at FAU Stadium, Boca Raton, FL

- Date: August 27
- Game time: 7:00 p.m.
- Game weather: 87 °F (31 °C) • Weather: Sunny• Wind: 0 MPH
- Game attendance: 19,571
- Referee: Patrick Foy
- TV announcers (CBSSN): Chris Hassel, Robert Turbin

Statistics	Charlotte	Florida Atlantic
First downs	11	26
Plays–yards	279	482
Rushes–yards	62	218
Passing yards	217	264
Passing: comp–att–int	1	0
Time of possession	25:04	34:56

Team	Category	Player	Statistics
Charlotte	Passing	Chris Reynolds	14-19,196 yards, 2 TD
Charlotte	Rushing	Shadrick Byrd	14 rushes, 51 yards, 2 TD
Charlotte	Receiving	Grant DuBose	4 receptions, 89 yards, 2 TD
Florida Atlantic	Passing	N'Kosi Perry	16-22, 256 yards, 1 TD
Florida Atlantic	Rushing	Larry McCammon	14 rushes, 118 yards, 1 TD
Florida Atlantic	Receiving	LaJohntay Wester	4 receptions, 66 yards

Scoring summary

Quarter	Time	Drive			Team	Scoring information	Score	
Quarter	Time	Plays	Yards	TOP	Team	Scoring information	Charlotte	Florida Atlantic
							0	0
"TOP" = time of possession. For other American football terms, see Glossary of American football.							0	0

=== At Ohio ===
Florida Atlantic Owls (1–0) vs. Ohio Bobcats (0–0)

Quarter	1	2	3	4	Total
Florida Atlantic	10	7	0	21	38
Ohio	3	10	14	14	41

at Peden Stadium • Athens, OH

- Date: Saturday, September 3, 2022
- Game time: 6:00 p.m. EDT
- Game weather: sunny, Temperature:75 °F (24 °C)
- Game attendance: 20,003
- Referee: Tom Stapleton
- TV announcers (ESPN+): Anthony Lima, Je'Rod Cherry
- box score, Ohio notes

Game information

First Quarter

- (11:10) FAU – Burton, Je'Quan 20 yd pass from Perry, N'Kosi (Suarez, Morgan kick) 10 plays, 75 yards, TOP 03:50 (FAU 7–0)
- (07:00) OHIO – Vakos, Nathanial 29 yd field goal 4 plays, yards, TOP 01:43 (FAU 7–3)
- (02:50) FAU – Suarez, Morgan 24 yd field goal 11 plays, 68 yards, TOP 04:10 (FAU 10–3)

Second Quarter

- (14:13) OHIO – Wiglusz, Sam 6 yd pass from Rourke, Kurtis (Vakos, Nathanial kick) 9 plays, 75 yards, TOP 03:37 (Tied 10–10)
- (10:38) FAU – Edrine, Jahmal 16 yd pass from Perry, N'Kosi (Suarez, Morgan kick) 11 plays, 73 yards, TOP 03:35 (FAU 17–10)
- (01:24) OHIO – Vakos, Nathanial 36 yd field goal 9 plays, 66 yards, TOP 03:25 (FAU 17–13)

Third Quarter

- (10:33) OHIO – Wiglusz, Sam 5 yd pass from Rourke, Kurtis (Vakos, Nathanial kick) 11 plays, 87 yards, TOP 04:21 (OHIO 20–17)
- (04:24) OHIO – Cross, Miles 1 yd pass from Rourke, Kurtis (Vakos, Nathanial kick) 9 plays, 78 yards, TOP 04:19 (OHIO 27–17)

Fourth Quarter

- (12:20) OHIO – Rourke, Kurtis 2 yd run (Vakos, Nathanial kick) 4 plays, 29 yards, TOP 01:37 (OHIO 34–17)
- (10:22) FAU – Johnson, Tony 9 yd pass from Perry, N'Kosi (Suarez, Morgan kick) 8 plays, 75 yards, TOP 01:58 (OHIO 34–24)
- (07:10) OHIO – Bostic, James 15 yd pass from Rourke, Kurtis (Vakos, Nathanial kick) 5 plays, 83 yards, TOP 03:08 (OHIO 41–24)
- (06:09) FAU – Edrine, Jahmal 7 yd pass from Perry, N'Kosi (Suarez, Morgan kick) 3 plays, 75 yards, TOP 01:01 (OHIO 41–31)
- (04:09) FAU – Wester, LaJohntay 7 yd pass from Perry, N'Kosi (Suarez, Morgan kick) 1 plays, 7 yards, TOP 00:06 (OHIO 41–38)

Statistics	FAU	OHIO
First downs	25	26
Total yards	478	476
Rushes/yards	29/114	39/131
Passing yards	364	345
Passing: Comp–Att–Int	24–42–0	27–34–0
Time of possession	24:19	35:41

Team	Category	Player	Statistics
Florida Atlantic	Passing	N'Kosi Perry	24/42, 364 yards, 5 TD
Florida Atlantic	Rushing	Larry McCammon	14 rushes, 60 yards
Florida Atlantic	Receiving	Je'Quan Burton	5 receptions, 115 yards, 1 TD
Ohio	Passing	Kurtis Rourke	27/34, 345 yards, 4 TD
Ohio	Rushing	Sieh Bangura	23 rushes, 114 yards
Ohio	Receiving	James Bostic	6 receptions, 136 yards, 1 TD

Ohio recovered from an early deficit and then had to hold on to avoid surrendering a late 17 point lead in winning a shootout against Florida Atlantic. Quarterback Kurtis Rourke and freshman kicker Nathanial Vakos both earned MAC East Player of the Week awards.

=== No. 21 (FCS) Southeastern Louisiana ===
Southeastern Louisiana Lions (0-1) vs. Florida Atlantic Owls (1-1)

Quarter	1	2	3	4	Total
No. 21 (FCS) Lions	0	3	0	6	9
Owls	7	21	7	7	42

at FAU Stadium, Boca Raton, FL

- Date: September 10
- Game time: 5:00 p.m.
- Game weather: Sunny
- Game attendance: 17,533
- Referee: Joe Lehring
- TV: ESPN3

=== UCF ===
UCF Knights at Florida Atlantic Owls (2-1)

Quarter	1	2	3	4	Total
Knights	7	9	14	10	40
Owls	14	0	0	0	14

at FAU Stadium, Boca Raton, FL

- Date: September 17
- Game time: 7:30 p.m.
- Game weather: 79 °F (26 °C) • Weather: Sunny• Wind: W 4 MPH
- Game attendance: 30,991
- Referee: Kevin Randall
- TV: CBSSN

Statistics	UCF	Florida Atlantic
First downs		
Plays–yards		
Rushes–yards		
Passing yards		
Passing: comp–att–int		
Time of possession		

Team	Category	Player	Statistics
UCF	Passing		
UCF	Rushing		
UCF	Receiving		
Florida Atlantic	Passing		
Florida Atlantic	Rushing		
Florida Atlantic	Receiving		

Scoring summary

Quarter	Time	Drive			Team	Scoring information	Score	
Quarter	Time	Plays	Yards	TOP	Team	Scoring information	UCF	Florida Atlantic
							0	0
"TOP" = time of possession. For other American football terms, see Glossary of American football.							0	0

=== At Purdue ===
	1	2	3	4	Total
Owls	0	13	7	6	26
Boilermakers	7	7	7	7	28

=== At North Texas ===
Florida Atlantic Owls at North Texas Mean Green

Quarter	1	2	3	4	Total
Owls	7	14	0	7	28
Mean Green	7	21	14	3	45

at Apogee Stadium, Dallas, TX

- Date: October 1
- Game time: 4:00 p.m.
- Game weather: 83 °F (28 °C) • Weather: Sunny• Wind: S 10 MPH
- Game attendance: 18,274
- Referee: Joe Lehring
- TV: ESPN+

Statistics	FAU	UNT
First downs	24	21
Plays–yards	432	481
Rushes–yards	137	300
Passing yards	295	181
Passing: comp–att–int	2	2
Time of possession	26:26	33:24

Team	Category	Player	Statistics
Florida Atlantic	Passing	N'Kosi Perry	26/50, 295 yards, 2 TD, 2 INT
Florida Atlantic	Rushing	Larry McCammon	15 rushes, 79 yards
Florida Atlantic	Receiving	LaJohntay Wester	10 receptions, 113 yards, TD
North Texas	Passing	Austin Aune	14/20, 180 yards, 3 TD, INT
North Texas	Rushing	Ikaika Ragsdale	16 rushes, 119 yards, TD
North Texas	Receiving	Roderic Burns	3 receptions, 69 yards

Scoring summary

Quarter	Time	Drive			Team	Scoring information	Score	
Quarter	Time	Plays	Yards	TOP	Team	Scoring information	Florida Atlantic	North Texas
							0	0
"TOP" = time of possession. For other American football terms, see Glossary of American football.							0	0

=== Rice ===
	1	2	3	4	Total
Rice Owls	14	0	0	0	14
FAU Owls	0	7	3	7	17

=== At UTEP ===
	1	2	3	4	Total
Owls	0	7	7	7	21
Miners	0	6	8	10	24

=== UAB ===
	1	2	3	4	Total
Blazers	0	14	3	0	17
Owls	10	0	14	0	24

Statistics	UAB	FAU
First downs	23	16
Total yards	472	359
Rushing yards	280	162
Passing yards	192	197
Turnovers	0	0
Time of possession	36:00	24:00

Team	Category	Player	Statistics
UAB	Passing	Jacob Zeno	18/32, 192 yards, TD
UAB	Rushing	DeWayne McBride	24 rushes, 168 yards, TD
UAB	Receiving	Trea Shropshire	2 receptions, 60 yards
Florida Atlantic	Passing	N'Kosi Perry	14/25, 197 yards, 3 TD
Florida Atlantic	Rushing	Zuberi Mobley	7 rushes, 57 yards
Florida Atlantic	Receiving	Je'Quan Burton	2 receptions, 55 yards, TD

=== At FIU ===
	1	2	3	4	Total
Owls	21	10	14	7	52
Panthers	0	7	0	0	7

Statistics	FAU	FIU
First downs	25	14
Total yards	385	277
Rushing yards	281	203
Passing yards	104	74
Turnovers	0	4
Time of possession	32:52	27:08

Team	Category	Player	Statistics
Florida Atlantic	Passing	N'Kosi Perry	14/21, 104 yards, 2 TD
Florida Atlantic	Rushing	Larry McCammon	26 rushes, 104 yards
Florida Atlantic	Receiving	Tony Johnson	2 receptions, 43 yards, TD
FIU	Passing	Grayson James	9/26, 56 yards, 2 INT
FIU	Rushing	Lexington Joseph	11 rushes, 87 yards
FIU	Receiving	Tyrese Chambers	2 receptions, 28 yards

=== At Middle Tennessee ===
	1	2	3	4	Total
Owls	7	7	7	0	21
Blue Raiders	14	14	14	7	49

=== Western Kentucky ===
	1	2	3	4	OT	Total
Hilltoppers	0	7	10	7	8	32
Owls	0	7	10	7	7	31

== Coaching staff ==
Name	Title
Willie Taggart	Head coach
Raymond Woodie	Associate head coach / outside linebackers and recruiting coordinator
Brent Dearmon	Offensive coordinator / quarterbacks coach
Todd Orlando	Defensive coordinator / linebackers coach
Chad Lunsford	Tight ends coach / special teams coordinator
Ed Warinner	Run game coordinator / offensive line coach
Derrick Gibson	Safeties coach
Billy Gonzales	Wide receivers coach
Brandon Harris	Cornerbacks coach
Kevin Patrick	Defensive line coach
Donte Pimpleton	Running backs coach
