= 2022 Rice Owls football team =

American college football season

2022 Rice Owls football

LendingTree Bowl, L 24–38 vs. Southern Miss
- Conference: Conference USA
- Record: 5–8 (3–5 C-USA)
- Head coach: Mike Bloomgren (5th season)
- Offensive coordinator: Marques Tuiasosopo (2nd season)
- Offensive scheme: Pro-style
- Defensive coordinator: Brian Smith (5th season)
- Base defense: Multiple 3–4
- Home stadium: Rice Stadium

2022 Conference USA football standings
	Conf.			Overall
Team	W		L	W		L
UTSA y$	8	–	0	11	–	3
Western Kentucky	6	–	2	9	–	5
North Texas y	6	–	2	7	–	7
Middle Tennessee	4	–	4	8	–	5
UAB	4	–	4	7	–	6
Florida Atlantic	4	–	4	5	–	7
Rice	3	–	5	5	–	8
UTEP	3	–	5	5	–	7
FIU	2	–	6	4	–	8
Charlotte	2	–	6	3	–	9
Louisiana Tech	2	–	6	3	–	9
Championship: UTSA 48, North Texas 27
$ – Conference champion; y – Championship game participant; Rankings from AP Poll

The 2022 Rice Owls football team represented Rice University as a member of Conference USA (C-USA) during the 2022 NCAA Division I FBS football season. They were led by head coach Mike Bloomgren, who was coaching his fifth season with the team. The Owls played their home games at the Rice Stadium in Houston, Texas.

In October 2021, Rice accepted the invitation to join the American Athletic Conference (AAC), scheduled to become a full-member on July 1, 2023. The 2022 season was expected to be the program's last season as a member of Conference USA.

The Owls finished their regular season with a 5–7 record, and became bowl eligible due to having the highest APR among FBS teams with 5–7 records.

== Preseason ==
=== C-USA media day ===
The Conference USA media day was held on July 27 at Globe Life Field in Arlington, Texas. The Owls were predicted to finish tenth in the conference's preseason poll.

== Roster ==
2022 Rice Owls football team roster
Players
Coaches
Offense

Pos.	#	Name	Class
RB	0	Dean Connors	So
RB	1	Cameron Montgomery	Sr
WR	2	Bradley Rozner	Sr
QB	3	Jovoni Johnson	So
WR	4	Cedric Patterson III	GS
QB	5	Wiley Green	Jr
WR	6	Isaiah Esdale	GS
QB	7	T. J. McMahon	Jr
RB	8	Juma Otoviano	Jr
WR	9	Sam Crawford	GS
WR	10	Luke McCaffrey	So
WR	11	Tyson Thompson	So
QB	12	A. J. Padgett	Fr
QB	13	Christian Edgar	Fr
TE	14	Nate Kamper	Fr
QB	15	Shawqi Itraish	Fr
WR	17	Kobie Campbell	So
WR	19	Peyton Stevenson	Fr
WR	20	Uriah West	GS
WR	22	Ryan Guillo	Fr
RB	26	Christian Francisco	Fr
RB	30	Ari Broussard	Jr
FB	32	Jerry Johnson III	So
RB	35	Michael Amico	Fr
FB	49	Micah Barnett	Fr
OL	52	Braedon Nutter	So
OL	53	Mike Leone	Fr
OL	54	Isaac Klarkowski	So
C	56	Stefan Gustafson	Fr
OL	58	Shea Baker	Sr
OL	61	Trace Norfleet	Fr
OL	62	Faae Pepe	So
OL	63	Noah Robertson	So
OL	69	Payton Lovell	So
OL	70	Isaiah Gonzalez	So
OL	71	Clay Servin	Jr
OL	72	Trey Phillippi	Fr
OL	74	Brad Baur	Fr
OL	75	Miguel Cedeno	Fr
OL	76	John Long	Fr
OL	77	John Hughes	GS
OL	78	Ethan Onianwa	Fr
OL	79	Weston Kropp	So
WR	80	Rawson MacNeill	Fr
WR	81	Braylen Walker	Fr
TE	82	Gavin Reinwald	GS
TE	83	Alex Scherle	Fr
WR	84	Bennett Mecom	So
TE	85	Boden Groen	Fr
TE	86	Connor Welsh	Fr
TE	87	Jack Bradley	Jr
TE	88	Jaggar Hebeisen	Fr

Defense

Pos.	#	Name	Class
S	0	Ajavon Litchfeld	GS
CB	1	Sean Fresch	So
CB	2	Tre'shon Devones	So
CB	4	Jordan Dunbar	So
S	4	Marcus Williams	Fr
S	5	Chike Anigbogu	Jr
LB	6	D. J. Arkansas	Fr
DE	7	Trey Schuman	Sr
LB	8	Treshawn Chamberlain	Jr
S	9	Kirk Lockhart	Jr
DE	10	Kenneth Orji	Sr
LB	11	Chris Conti	Jr
OLB	12	Josh Pearcy	So
CB	13	Lamont Narcisse	So
S	14	Joshua Williams	Fr
DL	16	Chibby Nwajuaku	Fr
S	19	Ichmael Joseph	Fr
S	20	George Nyakwol	GS
OLB	21	Garrett Braden	Fr
CB	22	Jonathan Jean	Fr
CB	23	Jeremiah Williams	Fr
CB	24	Miles McCord	Sr
S	25	Daveon Hook	Fr
DB	26	Gabe Taylor	So
LB	27	Andrew Awe	So
OLB	28	Shepherd Bowling	Fr
DL	30	Elroyal Morris III	Fr
S	31	Tyson Flowers	Fr
LB	33	Myron Morrison	So
LB	40	Kenny Seymour Jr.	Fr
S	41	Plae Wyatt	So
LB	44	Geron Hargon	Fr
LB	44	Aidan Siano	So
DL	45	Demone Green	Fr
DL	50	Izeya Floyd	So
DL	52	Jalen Hargrove	Fr
DL	55	De'Braylon Carroll	So
DL	75	Blake Boenisch	Fr
CB	89	Cemarion Chambliss	Fr
DE	91	Ikenna Enechukwu	Jr
DL	92	Quent Titre	GS
DL	95	Caleb James	So
DL	97	Cal Varner III	Fr
DL	98	Van Heitmann	So
DL	99	Davion Carter	Fr
DL	99	Cole Latos	Fr

Special teams

Pos.	#	Name	Class
K	15	Tim Horn	So
ATH	16	Quinton Jackson	Fr
P	18	Conor Hunt	Jr
K	28	Enoch Gota	Fr
K, P	31	Christian Vansickle	GS
K, P	38	Zach Adams	Fr
LS	46	Jacob Wilson	GS
DS	47	Thomas Tholen II	So
DS	55	Landon Mitchell	Fr
P	99	Charlie Mendes	So

Head coach

- Mike Bloomgren

Coordinators/assistant coaches

- Marques Tuiasosopo (Offensive coordinator / quarterbacks)
- Brian Smith (Defensive coordinator / linebackers)
- Chris Monfiletto (special teams coordinator)
- C. J. Anderson (running backs)
- Cedric Calhoun (defensive line)
- Sanders Davis (offensive line)
- Jim Jackson (Tight ends)
- Mike Kershaw (wide receivers)
- Colin Spencer (safeties)
- Gerard Wilcher (cornerbacks)

Legend

- (C) Team captain
- (S) Suspended
- (I) Ineligible
- Injured
- Redshirt

Roster
Last update: June 28, 2022

== Schedule ==
Rice and Conference USA announced the 2022 football schedule on March 30, 2022.

Date	Time	Opponent	Site	TV	Result	Attendance
September 3	5:00 p.m.	at No. 14 USC*	Los Angeles Memorial Coliseum; Los Angeles, CA	P12N	L 14–66	60,113
September 10	6:30 p.m.	McNeese State*	Rice Stadium; Houston, TX	ESPN3	W 52–10	18,629
September 17	6:30 p.m.	Louisiana*	Rice Stadium; Houston, TX	ESPN+	W 33–21	18,746
September 24	5:00 p.m.	at Houston*	TDECU Stadium; Houston, TX (rivalry)	ESPN+	L 27–34	26,377
October 1	6:30 p.m.	UAB	Rice Stadium; Houston, TX	ESPN+	W 28–24	21,926
October 15	5:00 p.m.	at Florida Atlantic	FAU Stadium; Boca Raton, FL	ESPN+	L 14–17	21,465
October 22	2:00 p.m.	at Louisiana Tech	Joe Aillet Stadium; Ruston, LA	ESPN+	W 42–41 ^{OT}	18,300
October 29	1:00 p.m.	Charlotte	Rice Stadium; Houston, TX	ESPN3	L 23–56	18,187
November 3	6:00 p.m.	UTEP	Rice Stadium; Houston, TX	CBSSN	W 37–30	18,326
November 12	1:00 p.m.	at Western Kentucky	Houchens Industries–L. T. Smith Stadium; Bowling Green, KY	ESPN+	L 10–45	10,127
November 19	12:00 p.m.	UTSA	Rice Stadium; Houston, TX	ESPN+	L 7–41	18,249
November 26	1:00 p.m.	at North Texas	Apogee Stadium; Denton, TX	ESPN+	L 17–21	15,688
December 17	4:45 p.m.	vs. Southern Miss*	Hancock Whitney Stadium; Mobile, AL (LendingTree Bowl)	ESPN	L 24–38	20,512
*Non-conference game; Rankings from AP Poll (and CFP Rankings, after November 1) - Released prior to game; All times are in Central time

== Game summaries ==
=== At No.14 USC Trojans ===
Rice Owls (0-0) vs No. 14 USC Trojans (0-0)

Quarter	1	2	3	4	Total
Owls	7	7	0	0	14
No. 14 Trojans	7	24	28	7	66

at Los Angeles Memorial Coliseum • Los Angeles, CA

- Date: September 3rd
- Game time: 3:00 P.M PST
- Game attendance: 60,113
- Referee: Jim Wharrie
- TV announcers (P12N): Ted Robinson (play by play), Yogi Roth (analyst)

Statistics	Rice	No. 14 USC
First downs	14	27
Plays–yards	62–280	58–538
Rushes–yards	34–146	28–208
Passing yards	134	330
Passing: comp–att–int	14–28–4	25–30–0
Time of possession	32:39	27:21

Team	Category	Player	Statistics
Rice	Passing	Wiley Green	8/13, 69 yards, 1 INT
Rice	Rushing	Cameron Montgomery	6 carries, 99 yards
Rice	Receiving	Luke McCaffrey	5 receptions, 51 yards
No. 14 USC	Passing	Caleb Williams	19/22, 249yds, 2 TD
No. 14 USC	Rushing	Austin Jones	4 carries, 48 yards, 2 TD
No. 14 USC	Receiving	Jordan Addison	5 receptions, 54 yards, 2 TD

Scoring summary

Quarter	Time	Drive			Team	Scoring information	Score	
Quarter	Time	Plays	Yards	TOP	Team	Scoring information	Rice	No. 14 USC
1st	12:06	7	75	3:42	USC	Jordan Addison (#3) 5-yard touchdown reception from Caleb Williams (#13), Denis Lynch (#46) kick good	0	7
1st	3:12	16	74	8:09	Rice	Ari Broussard (#30) 1-yard touchdown run, Christian VanSickle (#31) kick good	7	7
2nd	15:00	9	84	3:56	USC	Austin Jones (#6) 4-yard touchdown run, Denis Lynch (#46) kick good	7	14
2nd	11:45	4	70	1:54	USC	Raleek Brown (#14) 14-yard touchdown run, Denis Lynch (#46) kick good	7	21
2nd	9:14	1	93	-	USC	Interception returned 93 yards for touchdown by Calen Bullock (#7), Denis Lynch (#46) kick good	7	28
2nd	2:20	10	75	6:30	Rice	Ari Broussard (#30) 2-yard touchdown run, Christian VanSickle (#31) kick good	14	28
2nd	0:00	11	67	1:35	USC	25-yard field goal by Denis Lynch (#46)	14	31
3rd	14:22	1	40	-	USC	Interception returned 40 yards for touchdown by Shane Lee (#53), Denis Lynch (#46) kick good	14	38
3rd	13:06	1	31	-	USC	Interception returned 31 yards for touchdown by Ralen Goforth (#10), Denis Lynch (#46) kick good	14	45
3rd	9:12	4	34	2:12	USC	Jordan Addison (#3) 3-yard touchdown reception from Caleb Williams (#13), Denis Lynch (#46) kick good	14	52
3rd	2:22	8	85	5:16	USC	Austin Jones (#6) 28-yard touchdown run, Denis Lynch (#46) kick good	14	59
4th	7:05	5	72	3:13	USC	Darwin Barlow (#22) 2-yard touchdown run, Denis Lynch (#46) kick good	14	66
"TOP" = time of possession. For other American football terms, see Glossary of American football.							14	66

=== Vs. McNeese State ===
McNeese State Cowboys (0–1) vs. Rice Owls (0–1)

Quarter	1	2	3	4	Total
Cowboys	0	0	10	0	10
Owls	10	21	14	7	52

at Rice Stadium • Houston, TX

- Date: September 10th
- Game time: 6:30 P.M CST
- Game attendance: 18,629
- Referee: Ed Ardito
- TV: ESPN3

Statistics	McNeese State	Rice
First downs	14	26
Plays–yards	51–263	74–487
Rushes–yards	30–172	43–209
Passing yards	91	278
Passing: comp–att–int	8–21–2	21–31–0
Time of possession	21:48	38:12

Team	Category	Player	Statistics
McNeese State	Passing	Know Kadum	5/12, 65 yards, 1 INT
McNeese State	Rushing	Deonta McMahon	5 carries, 101 yards, 1 TD
McNeese State	Receiving	Mason Pierce	3 receptions, 37 yards
Rice	Passing	TJ McMahon	20/29, 274 yards, 4 TD
Rice	Rushing	Ari Broussard	17 carries, 71 yards, 1 TD
Rice	Receiving	Bradley Rozner	3 receptions, 101 yards, 2 TD

Scoring summary

Quarter	Time	Drive			Team	Scoring information	Score	
Quarter	Time	Plays	Yards	TOP	Team	Scoring information	McNeese State	Rice
1st	7:23	4	-1	0:57	Rice	28-yard field goal by Christian VanSickle (#31)	0	3
1st	4:38	4	35	1:35	Rice	Bradley Rozner (#2) 13-yard touchdown reception from TJ McMahon (#7), Christian VanSickle (#31) kick good	0	10
2nd	10:17	11	70	7:07	Rice	TJ McMahon (#7) 9-yard touchdown run, Christian VanSickle (#31) kick good	0	17
2nd	6:59	1	91	-	Rice	Interception returned 91 yards for touchdown by Gabe Taylor (#26), Christian VanSickle (#31) kick good	0	24
2nd	3:26	5	20	2:05	Rice	Ari Broussard (#30) 2-yard touchdown run, Christian VanSickle (#31) kick good	0	31
3rd	14:31	2	77	0:23	McNeese State	Deonta McMahon (#20) 62-yard touchdown run, Garrison Smith (#37) kick good	7	31
3rd	14:20	1	75	0:11	Rice	Bradley Rozner (#2) 75-yard touchdown reception from TJ McMahon (#7), Christian VanSickle (#31) kick good	7	38
3rd	9:35	6	80	2:57	Rice	Jack Bradley (#87) 17-yard touchdown reception from TJ McMahon (#7), Christian VanSickle (#31) kick good	7	45
3rd	3:10	7	60	1:41	McNeese State	23-yard field goal by Garrison Smith (#37)	10	45
4th	13:14	11	75	4:56	Rice	Juma Otoviano (#8) 15-yard touchdown reception from TJ McMahon (#7), Christian VanSickle (#31) kick good	10	52
"TOP" = time of possession. For other American football terms, see Glossary of American football.							10	52

=== Vs. Louisiana ===
Louisiana Ragin' Cajuns (2–0) vs. Rice Owls (1–1)

Quarter	1	2	3	4	Total
Ragin' Cajuns	7	7	0	7	21
Owls	3	10	6	14	33

at Rice Stadium • Houston, TX

- Date: September 17th
- Game time: 6:30 P.M CST
- Game weather: 87 °F (31 °C) • Weather: Sunny • Wind: SE 10 MPH
- Game attendance: 18,746
- Referee: Scott Hardin
- TV announcers (ESPN+): David Saltzman (play-by-play), Chris Mycoskie (analyst)

Statistics	Louisiana	Rice
First downs	9	26
Plays–yards	43–175	80–449
Rushes–yards	15–61	44–146
Passing yards	114	303
Passing: comp–att–int	13–28–1	25–36–3
Time of possession	18:09	41:51

Team	Category	Player	Statistics
Louisiana	Passing	Ben Wooldridge	6/14, 76 yards
Louisiana	Rushing	Chris Smith	6 carries, 39 yards, 1 TD
Louisiana	Receiving	Michael Jefferson	5 receptions, 53 yards
Rice	Passing	TJ McMahon	25/36, 303 yards, 3 TD, 3 INT
Rice	Rushing	Ari Broussard	19 carries, 49 yards, 1 TD
Rice	Receiving	Luke McCaffrey	10 receptions, 105 yards, 2 TD

Scoring summary

Quarter	Time	Drive			Team	Scoring information	Score	
Quarter	Time	Plays	Yards	TOP	Team	Scoring information	Louisiana	Rice
1st	7:17	7	33	2:42	Rice	23-yard field goal by Christian VanSickle (#31)	0	3
1st	2:47	1	54	-	Louisiana	Interception returned 54 yards for touchdown by Caleb Anderson (#11), Preston Stafford (#37) kick good	7	3
2nd	5:20	13	83	7:56	Rice	Luke McCaffrey (#10) 8-yard touchdown reception from TJ McMahon (#7), Christian VanSickle (#31) kick good	7	10
2nd	1:24	3	17	1:28	Louisiana	Terrence Williams (#23) 11-yard touchdown reception from Chandler Fields (#18), Preston Stafford (#37) kick good	14	10
2nd	0:01	9	60	1:19	Rice	31-yard field goal by Christian VanSickle (#31)	14	13
3rd	10:20	11	75	4:40	Rice	Bradley Rozner (#2) 12-yard touchdown reception from TJ McMahon (#7), 2-point pass incomplete	14	19
4th	11:25	10	65	6:07	Rice	Luke McCaffrey (#10) 6-yard touchdown reception from TJ McMahon (#7), 2-point pass good	14	27
4th	9:17	7	75	2:08	Louisiana	Chris Smith (#13) 22-yard touchdown run, Preston Stafford (#37) kick good	21	27
4th	2:59	11	70	6:14	Rice	Ari Broussard (#30) 2-yard touchdown run, 2-point pass incomplete	21	33
"TOP" = time of possession. For other American football terms, see Glossary of American football.							21	33

=== At Houston (Bayou Bucket Classic) ===
Rice at Houston

Team	1	2	3	4	Total
Owls	0	14	10	3	27
• Cougars	7	3	14	10	34

- Date: September 24, 2022
- Location: TDECU Stadium (Houston, TX)
- Game start: 5:02 p.m. CDT
- Elapsed time: 3 hours and 28 minutes
- Game attendance: 26,377
- Game weather: 94 °F (34 °C) • Weather: Sunny
- Referee: Rodney Burnette
- TV announcers (ESPN+): Ted Emrich (play-by-play) and Taylor McHargue (analyst)

Scoring summary
1	(, , )
1	( , , )
2	(, , )
2	( , , )
3	( , , )
3	( , , )
4	( , , )
4	( , , )
OT	( , , )

Statistics	Rice	Houston
First downs	22	19
Plays–yards	65–424	58–427
Rushes–yards	25–90	32–178
Passing yards	334	249
Passing: Comp–Att–Int	25–40–1	19–26–1
Time of possession	29:55	30:05

Team	Category	Player	Statistics
Rice	Passing	T. J. McMahon	25/39, 334 yards, 1 TD, 1 INT
Rice	Rushing	Kobie Campbell	1 carry, 34 yards
Rice	Receiving	Bradley Rozner	5 receptions, 123 yards
Houston	Passing	Clayton Tune	19/26, 249 yards, 2 TDs, 1 INT
Houston	Rushing	Ta'Zhawn Henry	17 carries, 112 yards, 1 TD
Houston	Receiving	Tank Dell	7 receptions, 134 yards, 1 TD

=== UAB ===
	1	2	3	4	Total
Blazers	7	10	7	0	24
Owls	7	0	14	7	28

Statistics	UAB	RICE
First downs	22	15
Total yards	360	209
Rushing yards	122	105
Passing yards	238	104
Turnovers	2	1
Time of possession	30:00	30:00

Team	Category	Player	Statistics
UAB	Passing	Dylan Hopkins	15/21, 231 yards, 2 TD, INT
UAB	Rushing	DeWayne McBride	27 rushes, 121 yards, TD
UAB	Receiving	Tejhaun Palmer	2 receptions, 82 yards
Rice	Passing	T. J. McMahon	11/17, 104 yards, TD
Rice	Rushing	Cameron Montgomery	5 rushes, 34 yards
Rice	Receiving	Luke McCaffrey	5 receptions, 38 yards

=== At Florida Atlantic ===
	1	2	3	4	Total
Rice Owls	14	0	0	0	14
FAU Owls	0	7	3	7	17

=== At Louisiana Tech ===
	1	2	3	4	OT	Total
Owls	0	7	14	14	7	42
Bulldogs	10	0	17	8	6	41

Statistics	RICE	LT
First downs	24	19
Total yards	487	373
Rushing yards	279	144
Passing yards	208	229
Turnovers	3	1
Time of possession	33:22	26:38

Team	Category	Player	Statistics
Rice	Passing	T. J. McMahon	16/27, 208 yards, 3 TD
Rice	Rushing	Cameron Montgomery	14 rushes, 87 yards
Rice	Receiving	Luke McCaffrey	10 receptions, 171 yards, 2 TD
Louisiana Tech	Passing	Matthew Downing	12/24, 159 yards, 2 TD, INT
Louisiana Tech	Rushing	Marquis Crosby	14 rushes, 87 yards
Louisiana Tech	Receiving	Tre Harris	8 receptions, 92 yards, 3 TD

=== Charlotte ===
Charlotte vs Rice

Team	1	2	3	4	Total
• 49ers	7	21	21	7	56
Rice	14	3	0	6	23

- Date: October 29
- Location: Rice Stadium
  Houston, TX
- Game start: 2:02 pm EDT
- Elapsed time: 3:32
- Game attendance: 18,187
- Game weather: 61 °F (16 °C) • Weather: Sunny• Wind: W 10 MPH
- Referee: Joe Lehring
- TV announcers (ESPN3): David Saltzman, Chris Mycoskie

Scoring summary
1	10:32	RICE	Luke MCCAFFREY 27 Yd pass from TJ MCMAHON (Christian VANSICKLE Kick)	RICE 7–0
1	3:59	CHAR	Johnny MARTIN III 1 Yd Run (Antonio ZITA Kick)	TIED 7–7
1	0:38	RICE	Bradley ROZNER 35 Yd pass from TJ MCMAHON (Christian VANSICKLE Kick)	RICE 14–7
2	11:42	CHAR	Elijah SPENCER 15 Yd pass from Chris REYNOLDS (Antonio ZITA Kick)	TIED 14–14
2	8:22	RICE	Christian VANSICKLE 35 Yd Field Goal	RICE 17–14
2	5:52	CHAR	Shadrick BYRD 4 Yd Run (Antonio ZITA Kick)	CHAR 21–17
2	0:12	CHAR	Elijah SPENCER 10 Yd pass from Chris REYNOLDS (Antonio ZITA Kick)	CHAR 28–17
3	12:57	CHAR	Elijah SPENCER 21 Yd pass from Chris REYNOLDS (Antonio ZITA Kick)	CHAR 35–17
3	7:17	CHAR	Grant DUBOSE 9 Yd pass from Chris REYNOLDS (Antonio ZITA Kick)	CHAR 42–17
3	4:37	CHAR	Victor TUCKER 20 Yd pass from Chris REYNOLDS (Antonio ZITA Kick)	CHAR 49–17
4	9:43	RICE	Bradley ROZNER 29 Yd pass from TJ MCMAHON (Uriah WEST Run for Two-Point Conversion)	CHAR 49–23
4	6:50	CHAR	Calvin CAMP 9 Yd Run (Antonio ZITA Kick)	CHAR 56–23

Team	Category	Player	Statistics
Charlotte	Passing	Chris Reynolds	16–19, 254 yards, 5 TD
Charlotte	Rushing	Shadrick Byrd	13 rushes, 83 yards, 1 TD
Charlotte	Receiving	Elijah Spencer	5 receptions, 84 yards, 3 TD
Rice	Passing	T. J. McMahon	18–33, 218 yards, 3 TD, 1 INT
Rice	Rushing	T. J. McMahon	9 rushes, 45 yards
Rice	Receiving	Bradley Rozner	5 receptions, 105 yards, 2 TD

Statistics	CHAR	Rice
First downs	25	20
Total yards	514	370
Rushing yards	239	152
Passing yards	275	218
Turnovers	0	1
Time of possession	31:57	28:03

=== UTEP ===
	1	2	3	4	Total
Miners	7	10	3	10	30
Owls	10	10	7	10	37

=== At Western Kentucky ===
	1	2	3	4	Total
Owls	0	7	3	0	10
Hilltoppers	7	17	7	14	45

=== UTSA ===
	1	2	3	4	Total
Roadrunners	21	7	13	0	41
Owls	0	0	0	7	7

=== At North Texas ===
	1	2	3	4	Total
Owls	0	14	0	3	17
Mean Green	7	7	0	7	21

Statistics	RICE	UNT
First downs	19	16
Total yards	415	362
Rushing yards	186	159
Passing yards	229	203
Turnovers	2	0
Time of possession	35:43	24:17

Team	Category	Player	Statistics
Rice	Passing	AJ Padgett	13/22, 229 yards, TD, INT
Rice	Rushing	Juma Otoviano	14 rushes, 94 yards
Rice	Receiving	Braylen Walker	4 receptions, 77 yards, TD
North Texas	Passing	Austin Aune	16/29, 203 yards, 2 TD
North Texas	Rushing	Ikaika Ragsdale	17 rushes, 122 yards, TD
North Texas	Receiving	Ikaika Ragsdale	5 receptions, 59 yards, TD

=== Vs. Southern Miss (LendingTree Bowl) ===
	1	2	3	4	Total
Owls	0	3	21	0	24
Golden Eagles	7	10	7	14	38
