= 2022 UTEP Miners football team =

American college football season

2022 UTEP Miners football
- Conference: Conference USA
- Record: 5–7 (3–5 C-USA)
- Head coach: Dana Dimel (5th season)
- Offensive coordinator: Dave Warner (2nd season)
- Offensive scheme: Pro-style
- Defensive coordinator: Bradley Dale Peveto (2nd season)
- Base defense: 4–2–5
- Home stadium: Sun Bowl

2022 Conference USA football standings
	Conf.			Overall
Team	W		L	W		L
UTSA y$	8	–	0	11	–	3
Western Kentucky	6	–	2	9	–	5
North Texas y	6	–	2	7	–	7
Middle Tennessee	4	–	4	8	–	5
UAB	4	–	4	7	–	6
Florida Atlantic	4	–	4	5	–	7
Rice	3	–	5	5	–	8
UTEP	3	–	5	5	–	7
FIU	2	–	6	4	–	8
Charlotte	2	–	6	3	–	9
Louisiana Tech	2	–	6	3	–	9
Championship: UTSA 48, North Texas 27
$ – Conference champion; y – Championship game participant; Rankings from AP Poll

The 2022 UTEP Miners football team represented the University of Texas at El Paso (UTEP) as a member of Conference USA (C-USA) during the 2022 NCAA Division I FCS football season. Led by fifth-year head coach Dana Dimel, the Miners compiled an overall record of 5–7 with a mark of 3–5 in conference play, tying for seventh place in C-USA. The team played home games at the Sun Bowl in El Paso, Texas.

== Schedule ==
UTEP and Conference USA announced the 2022 football schedule on March 30, 2022.

Date	Time	Opponent	Site	TV	Result	Attendance
August 27	7:00 p.m.	North Texas	Sun Bowl; El Paso, TX	Stadium	L 13–31	45,971
September 3	1:30 p.m.	at No. 9 Oklahoma*	Gaylord Family Oklahoma Memorial Stadium; Norman, OK	FOX	L 13–45	83,173
September 10	7:00 p.m.	New Mexico State*	Sun Bowl; El Paso, TX (Battle of I-10)	ESPN+	W 20–13	23,325
September 17	6:00 p.m.	at New Mexico*	University Stadium; Albuquerque, NM	MW Network	L 10–27	15,269
September 23	7:00 p.m.	Boise State*	Sun Bowl; El Paso, TX	CBSSN	W 27–10	11,227
October 1	4:00 p.m.	at Charlotte	Jerry Richardson Stadium; Charlotte, NC	ESPN+	W 41–35	9,547
October 8	5:00 p.m.	at Louisiana Tech	Joe Aillet Stadium; Ruston, LA	ESPN+	L 31–41	16,375
October 22	2:00 p.m.	Florida Atlantic	Sun Bowl; El Paso, TX	ESPN+	W 24–21	12,796
October 29	7:00 p.m.	Middle Tennessee^{†}	Sun Bowl; El Paso, TX	ESPN+	L 13–24	10,727
November 3	5:00 p.m.	at Rice	Rice Stadium; Houston, TX	CBSSN	L 30–37	18,326
November 19	2:00 p.m.	FIU	Sun Bowl; El Paso, TX	ESPN+	W 40–6	10,758
November 26	1:30 p.m.	at UTSA	Alamodome; San Antonio, TX	Stadium	L 31–34	26,061
*Non-conference game; ^{†}Homecoming; Rankings from AP Poll (and CFP Rankings, after November 1) - Released prior to game; All times are in Mountain time

== Game summaries ==
=== North Texas ===
	1	2	3	4	Total
Mean Green	0	14	14	3	31
Miners	0	13	0	0	13

Statistics	UNT	UTEP
First downs	24	22
Total yards	399	400
Rushing yards	163	107
Passing yards	236	293
Turnovers	1	1
Time of possession	31:25	28:35

Team	Category	Player	Statistics
North Texas	Passing	Austin Aune	16/29, 236 yards, 3 TD
North Texas	Rushing	Ayo Adeyi	17 rushes, 80 yards
North Texas	Receiving	Roderic Burns	3 receptions, 72 yards
UTEP	Passing	Gavin Hardison	21/48, 293 yards, TD
UTEP	Rushing	Ronald Awatt	10 rushes, 36 yards
UTEP	Receiving	Tyrin Smith	7 receptions, 127 yards, TD

=== At No. 9 Oklahoma ===
UTEP Miners (0–1, 0–1) v No. 9 Oklahoma Sooners (0–0, 0–0)

Quarter	1	2	3	4	Total
Miners	0	10	0	3	13
No. 9 Sooners	21	7	14	3	45

at Gaylord Family Oklahoma Memorial Stadium • Norman, OK

- Date: Saturday, September 3, 2022
- Game time: 2:30 p.m. CDT
- Game weather: • Sunny Temperature: 96 °F (36 °C)
- Game attendance: 83,173
- Referee: Tuta Salaam
- TV announcers (FOX): Jason Benetti (play-by-play) & Brock Huard (analyst)

Game information

First quarter

- (13:43) OKLA – Dillon Gabriel 12 yard rush, Zach Schmit kick (Drive: 5 plays, 75 yards, 1:17; OKLA 7–0)
- (9:18) OKLA – Dillon Gabriel 6 yard pass to Brayden Willis, Zach Schmit kick (Drive: 6 plays, 93 yards, 1:48; OKLA 14–0)
- (6:43) OKLA – Gavin Freeman 46 yard rush, Zach Schmit kick (2 plays, 55 yards, 00:30; OKLA 21–0)

Second quarter

- (14:12) UTEP – Gavin Baechle 49 yd FG (Drive: 14 plays, 49 yards, 7:31; OKLA 21–3)
- (8:18) UTEP – Ronald Awatt 2 yard rush, Gavin Baechle kick (Drive: 10 plays, 85 yards, 5:10; OKLA 21–10)
- (0:55) OKLA – Dillon Gabriel 28 yard pass to Brayden Willis, Zach Schmit kick (Drive: 11 plays, 68 yards, 4:01; OKLA 28–10)

Third quarter

- (10:48) OKLA – Marcus Major 1 yard rush, Zach Schmit kick (Drive: 10 plays, 80 yards, 2:40; OKLA 35–10)
- (3:16) OKLA – Marcus Major 6 yard rush, Zach Schmit kick (Drive: 7 plays, 64 yards, 1:51; OKLA 42–10)

Fourth quarter

- (14:01) UTEP – Gavin Baechle 54 yard FG (Drive: 11 plays, 38 yards, 4:15; OKLA 42–13)
- (5:17) OKLA – Zach Schmit 22 yard FG (Drive: 9 plays, 37 yards, 5:28; OKLA 45–13)

Statistics	UTEP	OKLA
First downs	25	23
Total yards	316	492
Rushes/yards	31/28	38/259
Passing yards	288	233
Passing: Comp–Att–Int	31–52–1	15–23
Time of possession	38:33	21:27

Team	Category	Player	Statistics
UTEP	Passing	Gavin Hardison	26/43, 244 yards
UTEP	Rushing	Ronald Awatt	12 carries, 39 yards, 1 TD
UTEP	Receiving	Tyrin Smith	8 receptions, 71 yards
Oklahoma	Passing	Dillon Gabriel	15/23, 233 yards, 2 TD's
Oklahoma	Rushing	Eric Gray	16 carries, 102 yards
Oklahoma	Receiving	Marvin Mims	3 receptions, 81 yards

=== New Mexico State ===
New Mexico State Aggies at UTEP Miners – Game summary

Quarter	1	2	3	4	Total
Aggies	0	0	6	7	13
Miners	3	14	3	0	20

at Sun Bowl, El Paso, Texas

- Date: September 10
- Game time: 7:00 p.m. MDT
- Game weather: Sunny • Temperature: 88 °F (31 °C) • Wind: NW 2 MPH
- Game attendance: 23,325
- Referee: Michael Vandervelde
- TV announcers (ESPN+): Erik Elken and Jacob Boggs
- Box score, Recap

Statistics

Statistics	NMSU	UTEP
First downs		
Total yards		
Rushing yards		
Passing yards		
Turnovers		
Time of possession		

Team	Category	Player	Statistics
New Mexico State	Passing		
New Mexico State	Rushing		
New Mexico State	Receiving		
UTEP	Passing		
UTEP	Rushing		
UTEP	Receiving		

=== At New Mexico ===
	1	2	3	4	Total
Miners	3	0	0	7	10
Lobos	10	10	0	7	27

=== Boise State ===
	1	2	3	4	Total
Broncos	3	0	7	0	10
Miners	0	10	10	7	27

=== At Charlotte ===
UTEP vs Charlotte

Team	1	2	3	4	Total
• Miners	7	17	10	7	41
49ers	7	0	14	14	35

- Date: October 1
- Location: Jerry Richardson Stadium
  Charlotte, NC
- Game start: 6:02 pm EDT
- Elapsed time: 3:25
- Game attendance: 9,547
- Game weather: 63 °F (17 °C) • Weather: Cloudy• Wind: SE 4 MPH
- Referee: Rory Bernard
- TV announcers (ESPN+): Bobby Rosinski, Reginald Walker Jr., Hannah Bradey

Scoring summary
1	9:48	CHAR	Grant DUBOSE 23 Yd pass from Chris REYNOLDS (Antonio ZITA Kick)	CHAR 7–0
1	2:01	UTEP	Tyrin SMITH 17 Yd pass from Gavin HARDISON (Gavin BAECHLE Kick)	TIED 7–7
2	8:03	UTEP	Gavin BAECHLE 22 Yd Field Goal	UTEP 10–7
2	0:33	UTEP	Trent THOMPSON 26 Yd pass from Gavin HARDISON (Gavin BAECHLE Kick)	UTEP 17–7
2	0:20	UTEP	Tyrice KNIGHT 13 Yd Fumble Return (Gavin BAECHLE Kick)	UTEP 24–7
3	11:37	CHAR	Elijah SPENCER 23 Yd pass from Chris REYNOLDS (Antonio ZITA Kick)	UTEP 24–14
3	11:03	CHAR	Grant DUBOSE 2 Yd pass from Chris REYNOLDS (Antonio ZITA Kick)	UTEP 24–21
3	8:34	UTEP	Tyrin SMITH 58 Yd pass from Gavin HARDISON (Gavin BAECHLE Kick)	UTEP 31–21
3	0:36	UTEP	Gavin BAECHLE 29 Yd Field Goal	UTEP 34–21
4	13:46	UTEP	Jadrian TAYLOR 100 Yd Fumble Return (Gavin BAECHLE Kick)	UTEP 41–21
4	9:27	CHAR	Victor TUCKER 6 Yd pass from Chris REYNOLDS (Antonio ZITA Kick)	UTEP 41–28
4	3:11	CHAR	Shadrick BYRD 13 Yd Run (Antonio ZITA Kick)	UTEP 41–35

Game notes:

- UTEP's first win in program history in the Eastern Time Zone.
- 3rd game in the series since 2019, (CHAR 2–1).

Statistics	UTEP	CHAR
First downs	20	27
Total yards	425	447
Rushing yards	252	100
Passing yards	173	347
Turnovers	1	3
Time of possession	33:40	26:20

Team	Category	Player	Statistics
UTEP	Passing	Gavin Hardison	10–14, 173 yards, 3 TD
UTEP	Rushing	Deion Hankins	20 rushes, 112 yards
UTEP	Receiving	Tyrin Smith	4 reception, 106 yards, 2 TD
Charlotte	Passing	Chris Reynolds	21–37, 347 yards, 4 TD, 1 INT
Charlotte	Rushing	Shadrick Byrd	13 rushes, 80 yards, 1 TD
Charlotte	Receiving	Elijah Spencer	7 receptions, 160 yards, 1 TD

=== At Louisiana Tech ===
	1	2	3	4	Total
Miners	3	7	0	21	31
Bulldogs	20	10	0	11	41

Statistics	UTEP	LT
First downs	27	18
Total yards	501	380
Rushing yards	181	114
Passing yards	320	266
Turnovers	4	2
Time of possession	34:34	25:26

Team	Category	Player	Statistics
UTEP	Passing	Gavin Hardison	23/51, 320 yards, 2 TD, 3 INT
UTEP	Rushing	Ronald Awatt	15 rushes, 66 yards
UTEP	Receiving	Reynaldo Flores	6 receptions, 73 yards
Louisiana Tech	Passing	Parker McNeil	18/27, 266 yards, 4 TD
Louisiana Tech	Rushing	Marquis Crosby	14 rushes, 75 yards
Louisiana Tech	Receiving	Tre Harris	5 receptions, 126 yards, TD

=== Florida Atlantic ===
	1	2	3	4	Total
Owls	0	7	7	7	21
Miners	0	7	7	10	24

=== Middle Tennessee ===
	1	2	3	4	Total
Blue Raiders	10	0	7	7	24
Miners	0	10	0	3	13

=== At Rice ===
	1	2	3	4	Total
Miners	7	10	3	10	30
Owls	10	10	7	10	37

=== FIU ===
	1	2	3	4	Total
Panthers	0	0	0	6	6
Miners	14	24	0	2	40

Statistics	FIU	UTEP
First downs	5	29
Total yards	71	525
Rushing yards	15	335
Passing yards	56	190
Turnovers	1	1
Time of possession	18:00	42:00

Team	Category	Player	Statistics
FIU	Passing	Grayson James	6/16, 56 yards, INT
FIU	Rushing	Lexington Joseph	8 rushes, 10 yards
FIU	Receiving	Rivaldo Fairweather	1 reception, 22 yards
UTEP	Passing	Calvin Brownholtz	12/18, 190 yards, 2 TD
UTEP	Rushing	Reynaldo Flores	13 rushes, 128 yards, 2 TD
UTEP	Receiving	Kelly Akharaiyi	3 receptions, 99 yards, TD

=== At No. 25 UTSA ===
	1	2	3	4	Total
Miners	14	10	7	0	31
No. 25 Roadrunners	0	14	17	3	34
