= 2022 Middle Tennessee Blue Raiders football team =

American college football season

2022 Middle Tennessee Blue Raiders football

Hawaii Bowl champion

Hawaii Bowl, W 25–23 vs. San Diego State
- Conference: Conference USA
- Record: 8–5 (4–4 C-USA)
- Head coach: Rick Stockstill (17th season)
- Offensive coordinator: Mitch Stewart (1st season)
- Offensive scheme: Multiple
- Defensive coordinator: Scott Shafer (6th season)
- Base defense: Multiple 4–3
- Home stadium: Johnny "Red" Floyd Stadium

2022 Conference USA football standings
	Conf.			Overall
Team	W		L	W		L
UTSA y$	8	–	0	11	–	3
Western Kentucky	6	–	2	9	–	5
North Texas y	6	–	2	7	–	7
Middle Tennessee	4	–	4	8	–	5
UAB	4	–	4	7	–	6
Florida Atlantic	4	–	4	5	–	7
Rice	3	–	5	5	–	8
UTEP	3	–	5	5	–	7
FIU	2	–	6	4	–	8
Charlotte	2	–	6	3	–	9
Louisiana Tech	2	–	6	3	–	9
Championship: UTSA 48, North Texas 27
$ – Conference champion; y – Championship game participant; Rankings from AP Poll

The 2022 Middle Tennessee Blue Raiders football team represented Middle Tennessee State University as a member of Conference USA (C-USA) during the 2022 NCAA Division I FBS football season. They were led by head coach Rick Stockstill, who was coaching his seventeenth season with the team. The Blue Raiders played their home games at Johnny "Red" Floyd Stadium in Murfreesboro, Tennessee.

== Schedule ==
Middle Tennessee and Conference USA announced the 2022 football schedule on March 30, 2022.

Date	Time	Opponent	Site	TV	Result	Attendance
September 3	5:00 p.m.	at James Madison*	Bridgeforth Stadium; Harrisonburg, VA	ESPN+	L 7–44	23,074
September 10	3:00 p.m.	at Colorado State*	Canvas Stadium; Fort Collins, CO	MW Network	W 34–19	27,641
September 17	6:00 p.m.	Tennessee State*	Johnny "Red" Floyd Stadium; Murfreesboro, TN	ESPN3	W 49–6	22,227
September 24	2:30 p.m.	at No. 25 Miami (FL)*	Hard Rock Stadium; Miami Gardens, FL	ACCN	W 45–31	46,713
September 30	6:30 p.m.	UTSA	Johnny "Red" Floyd Stadium; Murfreesboro, TN	CBSSN	L 30–45	15,020
October 8	2:30 p.m.	at UAB	Protective Stadium; Birmingham, AL	Stadium	L 14–41	23,694
October 15	2:30 p.m.	Western Kentucky	Johnny "Red" Floyd Stadium; Murfreesboro, TN (100 Miles of Hate)	ESPN+	L 17–35	14,806
October 29	7:00 p.m.	at UTEP	Sun Bowl; El Paso, TX	ESPN+	W 24–13	10,727
November 5	2:00 p.m.	at Louisiana Tech	Joe Aillet Stadium; Ruston, LA	ESPN+	L 24–40	14,298
November 12	2:30 p.m.	Charlotte	Johnny "Red" Floyd Stadium; Murfreesboro, TN	ESPN3	W 24–14	9,806
November 19	2:30 p.m.	Florida Atlantic	Johnny "Red" Floyd Stadium; Murfreesboro, TN	ESPN+	W 49–21	9,958
November 26	5:00 p.m.	at FIU	Riccardo Silva Stadium; Westchester, FL	ESPN+	W 33–28	14,768
December 24	7:00 p.m.	vs. San Diego State*	Clarence T. C. Ching Athletics Complex; Honolulu, Hawaii (Hawaii Bowl)	ESPN	W 25–23	6,605
*Non-conference game; Rankings from AP Poll (and CFP Rankings, after November 1) - Released prior to game; All times are in Central time

== Game summaries ==
=== At James Madison ===
	1	2	3	4	Total
Blue Raiders	0	0	7	0	7
Dukes	0	21	16	7	44

=== At Colorado State ===
	1	2	3	4	Total
Blue Raiders	10	17	7	0	34
Rams	0	0	19	0	19

=== Tennessee State ===
	1	2	3	4	Total
Tigers	0	0	6	0	6
Blue Raiders	21	21	7	0	49

=== At Miami ===
	1	2	3	4	Total
Blue Raiders	17	7	7	14	45
Hurricanes	3	7	7	14	31

=== UTSA ===
	1	2	3	4	Total
Blue Raiders	0	20	0	10	30
Roadrunners	10	21	7	7	45

=== At UAB ===
	1	2	3	4	Total
Blue Raiders	7	0	7	0	14
Blazers	21	17	3	0	41

=== Western Kentucky ===
	1	2	3	4	Total
Hilltoppers	0	14	14	7	35
Blue Raiders	7	3	0	7	17

=== At UTEP ===
	1	2	3	4	Total
Blue Raiders	10	0	7	7	24
Miners	0	10	0	3	13

=== At Louisiana Tech ===
	1	2	3	4	Total
Blue Raiders	7	14	0	3	24
Bulldogs	14	13	13	0	40

=== Charlotte ===
	1	2	3	4	Total
49ers	0	14	0	0	14
Blue Raiders	0	7	7	10	24

=== Florida Atlantic ===
	1	2	3	4	Total
Owls	7	7	7	0	21
Blue Raiders	14	14	14	7	49

=== At FIU ===
	1	2	3	4	Total
Blue Raiders	6	14	7	6	33
Panthers	0	7	14	7	28

=== San Diego State (Hawaii Bowl) ===
	1	2	3	4	Total
Blue Raiders	0	13	3	9	25
Aztecs	14	0	3	6	23
