= 2022 Conference USA Football Championship Game =

2022 Ryan Conference USA Football Championship Game
- Conference Championship
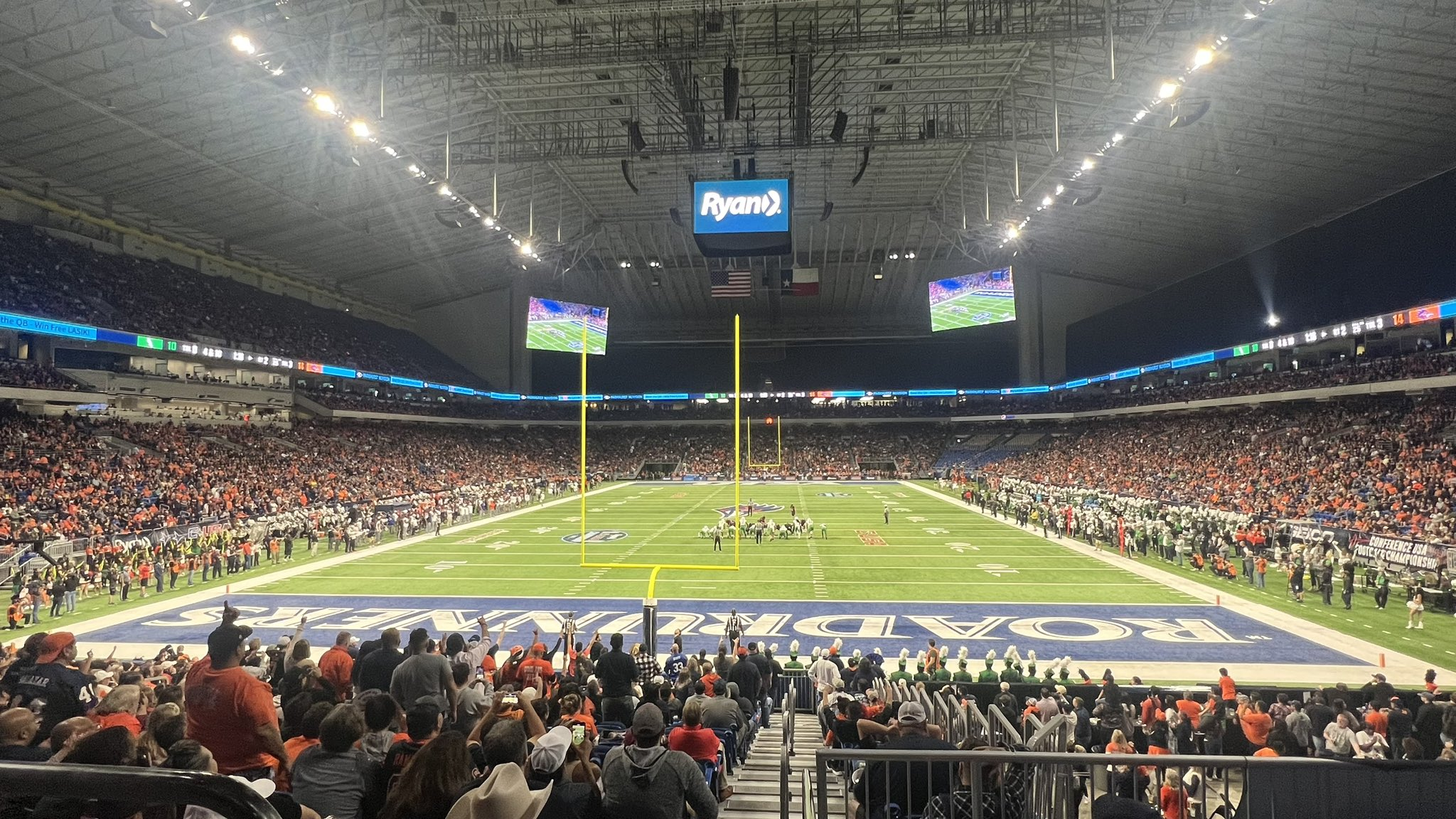
- The Alamodome during the 2022 Conference USA Championship Game
North Texas Mean Green	UTSA Roadrunners
(7–5)	(10–2)
27	48
Head coach: Seth Littrell	Head coach: Jeff Traylor
	AP / Coaches; 23 / 24
	1	2	3	4	Total
North Texas	7	3	10	7	27
UTSA	7	17	10	14	48
- Date: December 2, 2022
- Season: 2022
- Stadium: Alamodome
- Location: San Antonio, Texas
- MVP: Frank Harris, QB, UTSA
- Favorite: UTSA by 8.5
- Referee: Rory Bernard
- Attendance: 41,412

United States TV coverage
- Network: CBSSN
- Announcers: Rich Waltz, Aaron Taylor and Sherree Burruss

2022 Conference USA football standings
	Conf.			Overall
Team	W		L	W		L
UTSA y$	8	–	0	11	–	3
Western Kentucky	6	–	2	9	–	5
North Texas y	6	–	2	7	–	7
Middle Tennessee	4	–	4	8	–	5
UAB	4	–	4	7	–	6
Florida Atlantic	4	–	4	5	–	7
Rice	3	–	5	5	–	8
UTEP	3	–	5	5	–	7
FIU	2	–	6	4	–	8
Charlotte	2	–	6	3	–	9
Louisiana Tech	2	–	6	3	–	9
Championship: UTSA 48, North Texas 27
$ – Conference champion; y – Championship game participant; Rankings from AP Poll

The 2022 Conference USA Football Championship Game was a college football game played on December 2, 2022, at the Alamodome in San Antonio. It was the 18th edition of the Conference USA Football Championship Game and determined the champion of Conference USA (C–USA) for the 2022 season. The game began at 7:00 pm and aired on CBS Sports Network. The contest saw the host UTSA Roadrunners defeat the North Texas Mean Green 48–27 to claim the conference title for the second straight season. Sponsored by tax services and consulting firm Ryan LLC, the game was officially known as the Ryan Conference USA Football Championship Game.

This was the final C-USA game for both teams, which joined the American Athletic Conference in July 2023.

== Teams ==
North Texas and UTSA previously met in the regular season, also hosted at the Alamodome, with the Roadrunners defeating the Mean Green 31–27.

=== North Texas ===
North Texas finished the regular season with an overall record of 7–5, going 6–2 in C-USA play to finish tied for second in the conference with Western Kentucky. The Mean Green were selected for the championship game over the Hilltoppers due to tiebreakers as North Texas defeated Western Kentucky 40–13 in the regular season. This was the Mean Green's second appearance in the C-USA championship game, losing 17–41 to Florida Atlantic in the 2017 championship game.

The Mean Green were led by seventh-year head coach Seth Littrell in what would be his last game as the program's head coach.

=== UTSA ===
The Roadrunners finished the regular season with an overall record of 10–2, going 8–0 in C-USA play to finish first in the conference. UTSA's only losses of the regular season were against no. 24 Houston, 35–37 in triple overtime, and 20–41 against no. 21 Texas. This was the Roadrunners' second appearance in the C-USA Championship game, having defeated Western Kentucky 49–41 in the previous year's championship game.

The Roadrunners were led by third-year head coach Jeff Traylor.

== Game summary ==
2022 Ryan Conference USA Football Championship Game

Quarter	1	2	3	4	Total
North Texas	7	3	10	7	27
No. 23 UTSA	7	17	10	14	48

at Alamodome • San Antonio, Texas

- Date: December 2, 2021
- Game time: 6:30 p.m. CST
- Game weather: n/a (game played indoors)
- Game attendance: 41,412
- Referee: Rory Bernard
- TV announcers (CBSSN): Rich Waltz (play-by-play), Aaron Taylor (analyst), and Sherree Burruss (sidelines)

Game information

1st quarter

- (12:04) UTSA – Kevorian Barnes 27 yard rush, Jared Sackett kick (Drive: 7 plays, 75 yards, 2:56; UTSA 7–0)
- (8:09) UNT – Ikaika Ragsdale 2 yard rush, Ethan Mooney kick (Drive: 11 plays, 70 yards, 3:55; Tied 7–7)

2nd quarter

- (10:34) UNT – Ethan Mooney 22 yard field goal (Drive: 14 plays, 93 yards, 5:10; North Texas 10–7)
- (8:25) UTSA – Frank Harris 11 yard rush, Jared Sackett kick (Drive: 2 plays, 15 yards, 0:35; UTSA 14–10)
- (1:12) UTSA – Jared Sackett 42 yard field goal (Drive: 14 plays, 65 yards, 5:40; UTSA 17–10)
- (0:11) UTSA – Zakhari Franklin 32 yard pass from Frank Harris, Jared Sackett kick (Drive: 3 plays, 62 yards, 0:26; UTSA 24–10)

3rd quarter

- (12:26) UNT – Ethan Mooney 24 yard field goal (Drive: 9 plays, 61 yards, 2:34; UTSA 24–13)
- (10:33) UTSA – Zakhari Franklin 14 yard pass from Frank Harris, Jared Sackett kick (Drive: 5 plays, 75 yards, 1:53; UTSA 31–13)
- (8:42) UNT – Jyaire Shorter 36 yard pass from Austin Aune, Ethan Mooney kick (Drive: 6 plays, 65 yards, 1:51; UTSA 31–20)
- (1:47) UTSA – Jared Sackett 43 yard field goal (Drive: 14 plays, 49 yards, 6:55; UTSA 34–20)

4th quarter

- (13:34) UNT – Isaiah Johnson 1 yard rush, Ethan Mooney kick (Drive: 8 plays, 64 yards, 3:13; UTSA 34–27)
- (11:09) UTSA – Zakhari Franklin 39 yard pass from Frank Harris, Jared Sackett kick (Drive: 5 plays, 75 yards, 2:25; UTSA 41–27)
- (4:07) UTSA – Oscar Cardenas 16 yard pass from Frank Harris, Jared Sackett kick (Drive: 3 plays, 21 yards, 0:22; UTSA 48–27)

Statistics	North Texas	UTSA
First downs	19	32
plays–yards	65–366	85–571
Rushes/yards	35–172	47–227
Passing yards	194	344
Passing: Comp–Att–Int	14–30–2	33–38–0
Time of possession	22:17	37:43

Team	Category	Player	Statistics
North Texas	Passing	Austin Aune	14/29, 194 yards, 1 TD, 2 INTs
North Texas	Rushing	Ikaika Ragsdale	17 carries, 108 yards, 1 TD
North Texas	Receiving	Kaylon Horton	3 receptions, 58 yards
UTSA	Passing	Frank Harris	32/37, 341 yards, 4 TDs
UTSA	Rushing	Kevorian Barnes	28 carries, 175 yards, 1 TD
UTSA	Receiving	Zakhari Franklin	10 receptions, 144 yards, 3 TDs
