= 2022 North Texas Mean Green football team =

American college football season

2022 North Texas Mean Green football
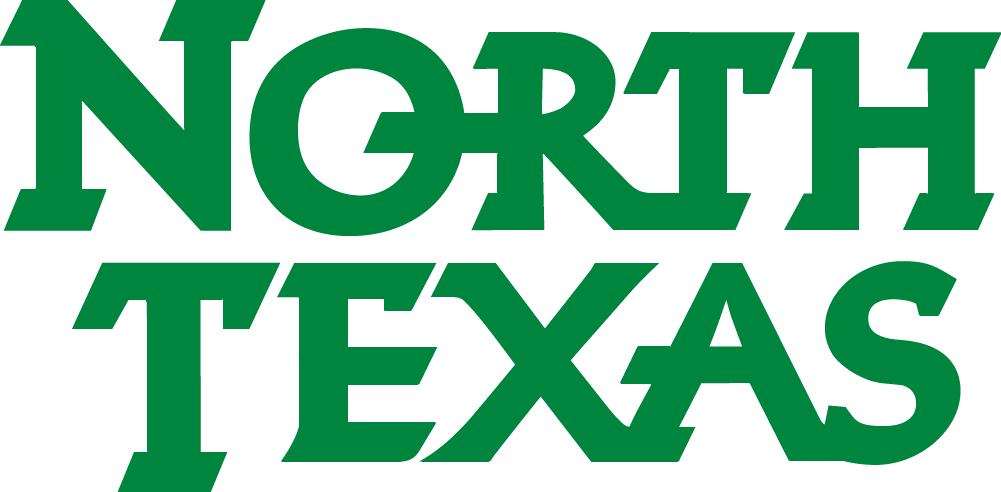

C-USA Championship Game, L 27–48 at UTSA

Frisco Bowl, L 32–35 vs. Boise State
- Conference: Conference USA
- Record: 7–7 (6–2 C-USA)
- Head coach: Seth Littrell (7th season; first 13 games); Phil Bennett (interim; bowl game)
- Offensive coordinator: Mike Bloesch (3rd season)
- Co-offensive coordinator: Tommy Mainord (4th season)
- Offensive scheme: Spread
- Defensive coordinator: Phil Bennett (2nd season)
- Co-defensive coordinator: Jim Gush (1st season)
- Base defense: 4–2–5
- Home stadium: Apogee Stadium

2022 Conference USA football standings
	Conf.			Overall
Team	W		L	W		L
UTSA y$	8	–	0	11	–	3
Western Kentucky	6	–	2	9	–	5
North Texas y	6	–	2	7	–	7
Middle Tennessee	4	–	4	8	–	5
UAB	4	–	4	7	–	6
Florida Atlantic	4	–	4	5	–	7
Rice	3	–	5	5	–	8
UTEP	3	–	5	5	–	7
FIU	2	–	6	4	–	8
Charlotte	2	–	6	3	–	9
Louisiana Tech	2	–	6	3	–	9
Championship: UTSA 48, North Texas 27
$ – Conference champion; y – Championship game participant; Rankings from AP Poll

The 2022 North Texas Mean Green football team represented the University of North Texas as a member of Conference USA (C-USA) during the 2022 NCAA Division I FBS football season. Led by Seth Littrell in his seventh and final season as head coach for first 13 games of the season and interim head coach Phil Bennett for the team's bowl game, the Mean Green compiled an overall record of 7–7 with a mark 6–2 in conference play, tying for second place in the C-USA. North Texas advanced to the C-USA Championship Game, losing to UTSA. North Texas was invited to the Frisco Bowl, where the Mean Green lost to Boise State. The team played home games at Apogee Stadium in Denton, Texas.

Littrell was fired on December 4, 2022, after the loss to UTSA. The team's defensive coordinator, Phil Bennett, was appointed interim head coach for the Frisco Bowl.

== Schedule ==
North Texas and Conference USA announced the 2022 football schedule on March 30, 2022.

Date	Time	Opponent	Site	TV	Result	Attendance
August 27	8:00 p.m.	at UTEP	Sun Bowl; El Paso, TX	Stadium	W 31–13	45,971
September 3	6:30 p.m.	SMU*	Apogee Stadium; Denton, TX (Safeway Bowl)	CBSSN	L 10–48	25,306
September 10	6:30 p.m.	Texas Southern*	Apogee Stadium; Denton, TX	ESPN3	W 59–27	15,984
September 17	2:00 p.m.	at UNLV*	Allegiant Stadium; Paradise, NV	MW Network	L 27–58	19,623
September 24	2:30 p.m.	at Memphis*	Liberty Bowl Memorial Stadium; Memphis, TN	ESPN+	L 34–44	23,203
October 1	3:00 p.m.	Florida Atlantic	Apogee Stadium; Denton, TX	ESPN+	W 45–28	18,274
October 15	3:00 p.m.	Louisiana Tech	Apogee Stadium; Denton, TX	ESPN+	W 47–27	16,590
October 22	2:30 p.m.	at UTSA	Alamodome; San Antonio, TX	Stadium	L 27–31	27,122
October 29	2:30 p.m.	at Western Kentucky	Houchens Industries–L. T. Smith Stadium; Bowling Green, KY	Stadium	W 40–13	17,194
November 5	3:00 p.m.	FIU	Apogee Stadium; Denton, TX	ESPN+	W 52–14	22,308
November 12	2:30 p.m.	at UAB	Protective Stadium; Birmingham, AL	Stadium	L 21–41	18,504
November 26	1:00 p.m.	Rice	Apogee Stadium; Denton, TX	ESPN+	W 21–17	15,668
December 2	6:30 p.m.	at UTSA	Alamodome; San Antonio, TX (C-USA Championship Game)	CBSSN	L 27–48	41,412
December 17	8:15 p.m.	vs. Boise State*	Toyota Stadium; Frisco, TX (Frisco Bowl)	ESPN	L 32–35	12,211
*Non-conference game; All times are in Central time

== Preseason ==
=== C-USA media day ===
The Conference USA media day was held on July 27 at Globe Life Field in Arlington, Texas. The Mean Green were represented by head coach Seth Littrell, tight end Jake Roberts, and linebacker K. D. Davis. The Mean Green were predicted to finish fifth in the conference's preseason poll.

== Game summaries ==
=== At UTEP ===
	1	2	3	4	Total
Mean Green	0	14	14	3	31
Miners	0	13	0	0	13

Statistics	UNT	UTEP
First downs	24	22
Total yards	399	400
Rushing yards	163	107
Passing yards	236	293
Turnovers	1	1
Time of possession	31:25	28:35

Team	Category	Player	Statistics
North Texas	Passing	Austin Aune	16/29, 236 yards, 3 TD
North Texas	Rushing	Ayo Adeyi	17 rushes, 80 yards
North Texas	Receiving	Roderic Burns	3 receptions, 72 yards
UTEP	Passing	Gavin Hardison	21/48, 293 yards, TD
UTEP	Rushing	Ronald Awatt	10 rushes, 36 yards
UTEP	Receiving	Tyrin Smith	7 receptions, 127 yards, TD

=== SMU ===
	1	2	3	4	Total
Mustangs	14	17	7	10	48
Mean Green	0	10	0	0	10

Statistics	SMU	UNT
First downs	23	21
Total yards	576	422
Rushing yards	150	202
Passing yards	426	220
Turnovers	2	3
Time of possession	26:07	33:53

Team	Category	Player	Statistics
SMU	Passing	Tanner Mordecai	23/32, 432 yards, 4 TD
SMU	Rushing	Tre Siggers	12 rushes, 54 yards, TD
SMU	Receiving	Rashee Rice	8 receptions, 166 yards, TD
North Texas	Passing	Austin Aune	14/29, 186 yards, 2 INT
North Texas	Rushing	Oscar Adaway III	20 rushes, 117 yards, TD
North Texas	Receiving	Ja'Mori Maclin	1 reception, 53 yards

=== Texas Southern ===
	1	2	3	4	Total
Tigers	3	14	7	3	27
Mean Green	10	35	7	7	59

Statistics	TXSO	UNT
First downs	26	32
Total yards	458	607
Rushing yards	219	348
Passing yards	239	259
Turnovers	1	1
Time of possession	32:09	27:51

Team	Category	Player	Statistics
Texas Southern	Passing	Andrew Body	19/29, 239 yards, TD
Texas Southern	Rushing	LaDarius Owens	10 rushes, 94 yards, TD
Texas Southern	Receiving	Derek Morton	7 receptions, 115 yards
North Texas	Passing	Austin Aune	11/20, 218 yards, 4 TD
North Texas	Rushing	Ayo Adeyi	10 rushes, 135 yards, TD
North Texas	Receiving	Ja'Mori Maclin	3 receptions, 80 yards, TD

=== At UNLV ===
	1	2	3	4	Total
Mean Green	10	10	7	0	27
Rebels	9	14	14	21	58

Statistics	UNT	UNLV
First downs	20	28
Total yards	474	576
Rushing yards	169	365
Passing yards	305	211
Turnovers	2	0
Time of possession	21:03	38:57

Team	Category	Player	Statistics
North Texas	Passing	Austin Aune	17/29, 305 yards, 2 TD, 2 INT
North Texas	Rushing	Ayo Adeyi	11 carries, 73 yards
North Texas	Receiving	Roderic Burns	5 receptions, 98 yards
UNLV	Passing	Doug Brumfield	21/27, 211 yards, 2 TD
UNLV	Rushing	Aidan Robbins	29 carries, 227 yards, 3 TD
UNLV	Receiving	Ricky White	7 receptions, 76 yards, TD

=== At Memphis ===
	1	2	3	4	Total
Mean Green	10	3	7	14	34
Tigers	6	14	7	17	44

Statistics	UNT	MEM
First downs	23	19
Total yards	473	334
Rushing yards	102	193
Passing yards	371	141
Turnovers	3	1
Time of possession	27:15	32:45

Team	Category	Player	Statistics
North Texas	Passing	Austin Aune	27/49, 371 yards, 3 TD, 2 INT
North Texas	Rushing	Oscar Adaway III	12 rushes, 46 yards
North Texas	Receiving	Jordan Smart	5 receptions, 82 yards
Memphis	Passing	Seth Henigan	19/29, 141 yards, 2 TD, INT
Memphis	Rushing	Brandon Thomas	15 rushes, 84 yards, 2 TD
Memphis	Receiving	Koby Drake	3 receptions, 41 yards

=== Florida Atlantic ===
	1	2	3	4	Total
Owls	7	14	0	7	28
Mean Green	7	21	14	3	45

Statistics	FAU	UNT
First downs	24	21
Total yards	432	481
Rushing yards	137	300
Passing yards	295	181
Turnovers	2	2
Time of possession	26:26	33:34

Team	Category	Player	Statistics
Florida Atlantic	Passing	N'Kosi Perry	26/50, 295 yards, 2 TD, 2 INT
Florida Atlantic	Rushing	Larry McCammon	15 rushes, 79 yards
Florida Atlantic	Receiving	LaJohntay Wester	10 receptions, 113 yards, TD
North Texas	Passing	Austin Aune	14/20, 180 yards, 3 TD, INT
North Texas	Rushing	Ikaika Ragsdale	16 rushes, 119 yards, TD
North Texas	Receiving	Roderic Burns	3 receptions, 69 yards

=== Louisiana Tech ===
	1	2	3	4	Total
Bulldogs	3	14	10	0	27
Mean Green	14	13	7	13	47

Statistics	LT	UNT
First downs	22	26
Total yards	504	671
Rushing yards	80	475
Passing yards	424	196
Turnovers	0	1
Time of possession	33:22	25:06

Team	Category	Player	Statistics
Louisiana Tech	Passing	Parker McNeil	26/37, 424 yards, 2 TD
Louisiana Tech	Rushing	Marquis Crosby	9 rushes, 46 yards
Louisiana Tech	Receiving	Smoke Harris	10 receptions, 156 yards
North Texas	Passing	Austin Aune	11/20, 196 yards, 2 TD, INT
North Texas	Rushing	Ayo Adeyi	7 rushes, 122 yards, TD
North Texas	Receiving	Var'Keyes Gumms	4 receptions, 59 yards, TD

=== At UTSA ===
	1	2	3	4	Total
Mean Green	6	0	7	14	27
Roadrunners	0	3	7	21	31

Statistics	UNT	UTSA
First downs	13	32
Total yards	347	495
Rushing yards	22	257
Passing yards	325	238
Turnovers	1	1
Time of possession	21:40	38:20

Team	Category	Player	Statistics
North Texas	Passing	Austin Aune	15/31, 325 yards, 3 TD, INT
North Texas	Rushing	Oscar Adaway III	10 rushes, 20 yards
North Texas	Receiving	Roderic Burns	6 receptions, 139 yards
UTSA	Passing	Frank Harris	27/39, 238 yards, 2 TD, INT
UTSA	Rushing	Brenden Brady	19 rushes, 112 yards, 2 TD
UTSA	Receiving	Joshua Cephus	11 receptions, 88 yards, TD

=== At Western Kentucky ===
	1	2	3	4	Total
Mean Green	17	3	0	20	40
Hilltoppers	7	6	0	0	13

Statistics	UNT	WKU
First downs	25	23
Total yards	541	466
Rushing yards	196	146
Passing yards	345	320
Turnovers	0	2
Time of possession	29:05	30:55

Team	Category	Player	Statistics
North Texas	Passing	Austin Aune	20/28, 322 yards, 3 TD
North Texas	Rushing	Ayo Adeyi	10 rushes, 72 yards, TD
North Texas	Receiving	Damon Ward Jr.	4 receptions, 101 yards, TD
Western Kentucky	Passing	Austin Reed	29/49, 320 yards, TD, INT
Western Kentucky	Rushing	L. T. Sanders	13 rushes, 76 yards
Western Kentucky	Receiving	Malachi Corley	8 receptions, 97 yards

=== FIU ===
	1	2	3	4	Total
Panthers	0	14	0	0	14
Mean Green	24	21	0	7	52

Statistics	FIU	UNT
First downs	12	27
Total yards	258	623
Rushing yards	113	209
Passing yards	145	414
Turnovers	2	3
Time of possession	26:03	33:57

Team	Category	Player	Statistics
FIU	Passing	Grayson James	19/35, 130 yards, 2 INT
FIU	Rushing	Grayson James	4 rushes, 37 yards
FIU	Receiving	Rivaldo Fairweather	1 reception, 39 yards
North Texas	Passing	Austin Aune	25/34, 414 yards, 5 TD, 2 INT
North Texas	Rushing	Stone Earle	11 rushes, 60 yards, TD
North Texas	Receiving	Jyaire Shorter	2 receptions, 92 yards, 2 TD

=== At UAB ===
	1	2	3	4	Total
Mean Green	0	21	0	0	21
Blazers	14	3	10	14	41

Statistics	UNT	UAB
First downs	14	24
Total yards	264	505
Rushing yards	105	271
Passing yards	159	234
Turnovers	1	1
Time of possession	22:33	37:27

Team	Category	Player	Statistics
North Texas	Passing	Austin Aune	15/32, 159 yards, TD
North Texas	Rushing	Ikaika Ragsdale	17 rushes, 74 yards
North Texas	Receiving	Damon Ward Jr.	6 receptions, 58 yards, TD
UAB	Passing	Dylan Hopkins	15/23, 234 yards, TD
UAB	Rushing	Jermaine Brown Jr.	24 rushes, 150 yards, TD
UAB	Receiving	Tejhaun Palmer	1 reception, 75 yards

=== Rice ===
	1	2	3	4	Total
Owls	0	14	0	3	17
Mean Green	7	7	0	7	21

Statistics	RICE	UNT
First downs	19	16
Total yards	415	362
Rushing yards	186	159
Passing yards	229	203
Turnovers	2	0
Time of possession	35:43	24:17

Team	Category	Player	Statistics
Rice	Passing	AJ Padgett	13/22, 229 yards, TD, INT
Rice	Rushing	Juma Otoviano	14 rushes, 94 yards
Rice	Receiving	Braylen Walker	4 receptions, 77 yards, TD
North Texas	Passing	Austin Aune	16/29, 203 yards, 2 TD
North Texas	Rushing	Ikaika Ragsdale	17 rushes, 122 yards, TD
North Texas	Receiving	Ikaika Ragsdale	5 receptions, 59 yards, TD

=== At UTSA—C-USA Championship Game ===
	1	2	3	4	Total
Mean Green	7	3	10	7	27
Roadrunners	7	17	10	14	48

Statistics	UNT	UTSA
First downs	19	32
Total yards	366	571
Rushing yards	172	227
Passing yards	194	344
Turnovers	2	0
Time of possession	22:17	37:43

Team	Category	Player	Statistics
North Texas	Passing	Austin Aune	14/29, 194 yards, TD, 2 INT
North Texas	Rushing	Ikaika Ragsdale	17 rushes, 108 yards, 1 TD
North Texas	Receiving	Kaylon Horton	3 receptions, 58 yards
UTSA	Passing	Frank Harris	32/37, 341 yards, 4 TD
UTSA	Rushing	Kevorian Barnes	28 rushes, 175 yards, 1 TD
UTSA	Receiving	Zakhari Franklin	10 receptions, 144 yards, 3 TD

=== Boise State—Frisco Bowl ===
	1	2	3	4	Total
Mean Green	3	7	14	8	32
Broncos	0	6	22	7	35

Statistics	UNT	BSU
First downs	23	23
Total yards	435	455
Rushing yards	176	318
Passing yards	259	137
Turnovers	2	0
Time of possession	27:43	32:17

Team	Category	Player	Statistics
North Texas	Passing	Austin Aune	17/32, 238 yards, TD, 2 INT
North Texas	Rushing	Ikaika Ragsdale	21 rushes, 94 yards, 2 TD
North Texas	Receiving	Jordan Smart	3 receptions, 94 yards
Boise State	Passing	Taylen Green	13/22, 137 yards, 1 TD
Boise State	Rushing	Ashton Jeanty	28 rushes, 178 yards, 1 TD
Boise State	Receiving	Latrell Caples	6 receptions, 87 yards
