= Frank Harris (quarterback, born 1999) =

American football player (born 1999)

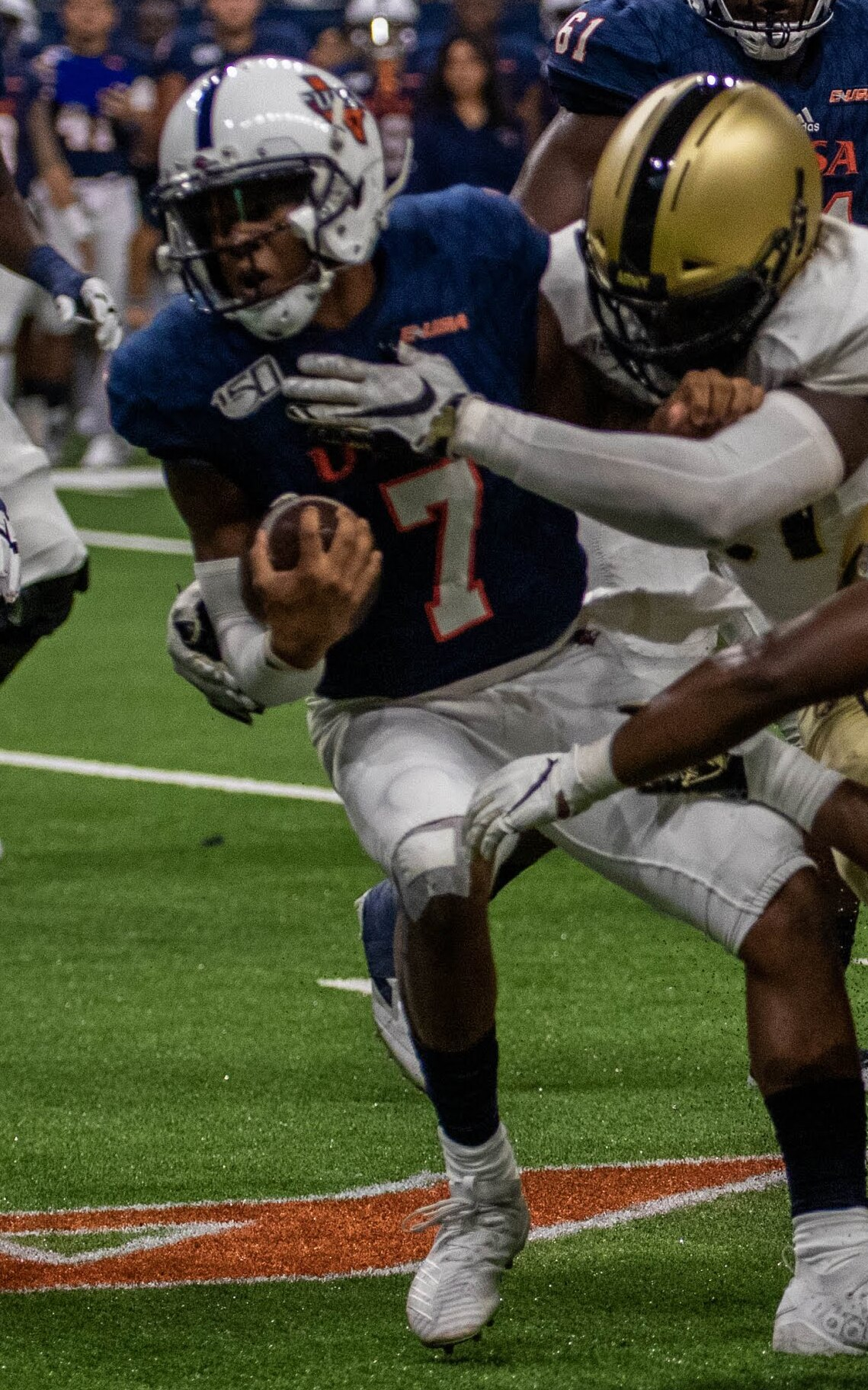
- Harris with UTSA in 2019

No. 0
- Position: Quarterback

Personal information
- Born: March 27, 1999 (age 27); San Antonio, Texas, U.S.
- Listed height: 6 ft 0 in (1.83 m)
- Listed weight: 205 lb (93 kg)

Career information
- High school: Samuel Clemens (Schertz, Texas)
- College: UTSA (2017–2023)

Awards and highlights
- C-USA Most Valuable Player (2022); First-team All-AAC (2023); First-team All-C-USA (2022); Second-team All-C-USA (2021)
- Stats at ESPN

Frank Randall Harris (born March 27, 1999) is an American former college football player who was a quarterback for seven seasons with the UTSA Roadrunners.

== College career ==
=== 2017 ===
As a true freshman in 2017, Harris redshirted and did not play.

=== 2018 ===
In 2018, Harris missed the season due to knee injuries.

=== 2019 ===
As a redshirt-sophomore in 2019, Harris started four games before separating his shoulder and missing the rest of the year.

=== 2020 ===
During his redshirt-junior year, Harris started 11 games, completing 159-of-250 passes for 1,630 yards and 12 touchdowns, along with six interceptions. He additionally ran for 528 yards and scored nine touchdowns. He led them to a berth in the 2020 First Responder Bowl, where they lost to Louisiana 31–24.

=== 2021 ===
In 2021, Harris started 14 games, and completed 263-of-398 passes for 3,177 yards and 27 touchdowns with six interceptions. He ran for 566 yards as well and scored six touchdowns. Harris led UTSA to the 15th ranked team in the AP to the conference championship, where he was 19-of-28 for 218 yards and two scores, while adding 81 yards on the ground as UTSA beat Western Kentucky 49–41. The Roadrunners lost in the 2021 Frisco Bowl to San Diego State. At the end of the season, Harris was named second-team all-conference.

=== 2022 ===
In the 2022 season, Harris started 14 games and completed 328-of-471 pass attempts for 4,063 yards and 32 touchdowns. He also ran for 602 yards and nine scores, being named the Conference USA most valuable player and first-team all-conference. Harris led the team to the 2022 Conference USA Football Championship Game, where UTSA defeated North Texas by a score of 48–27. In the game, he threw for 341 yards and four touchdowns while completing all but five of his 37 pass attempts. UTSA was defeated in the 2022 Cure Bowl by Troy, losing 18–12.

=== 2023 ===
Harris returned to UTSA for a seventh year in 2023. After suffering a variety of different injuries during spring camp and the regular season, Harris did not play in the 2023 Frisco Bowl. He would announce his retirement from playing football following the end of the season.

=== Impact in San Antonio ===
With Harris on campus for a seventh season in 2023, he had been part of the program for more than half of its 13 seasons. In a 2023 ESPN story focusing on several "senior citizens" in college football, among them Harris, UTSA head coach Jeff Traylor said about him:

Frank Harris? In this city? There's going to be a lot of businesses lining up to hire Frank Harris. He's got an amazing story. I'd put him in sales and turn him loose. He'd make some millionaire a billionaire. Everybody knows Frank. Other than [Spurs draft pick Victor Wembanyama], I think he's the second most popular. ... I'd say it's Wemb[anyama], [Spurs coach Gregg Popovich], Tony Parker, David Robinson, [Manu] Ginobili, [Tim] Duncan, and then Frank's probably in there.

=== Statistics ===
Year	Team	Games			Passing								Rushing			
Year	Team	GP	GS	Record	Cmp	Att	Pct	Yds	Avg	TD	Int	Rtg	Att	Yds	Avg	TD
2017	UTSA	0	0	—	Redshirt											
2018	UTSA	0	0	—	Did not play due to injury											
2019	UTSA	4	4	1–3	66	91	72.5	486	5.3	3	2	123.9	39	126	3.2	0
2020	UTSA	11	10	7–3	159	250	63.6	1,630	6.5	12	6	129.4	95	528	5.6	9
2021	UTSA	14	14	12–2	263	398	66.1	3,177	8.7	27	6	152.5	109	566	5.2	6
2022	UTSA	14	14	11–3	328	471	69.6	4,063	8.6	32	9	160.7	129	602	4.7	9
2023	UTSA	10	10	8–2	218	336	64.9	2,506	7.5	18	8	140.4	86	323	3.8	4
Career		53	52	39−13	1,034	1,546	66.9	11,858	7.7	92	31	146.9	447	2,143	4.7	28
