= Austin Aune =

American football player (born 1993)

Profile
- Position: Quarterback

Personal information
- Born: September 6, 1993 (age 33); Argyle, Texas, U.S.
- Listed height: 6 ft 2 in (1.88 m)
- Listed weight: 221 lb (100 kg)

Career information
- High school: Argyle
- College: Arkansas (2018); North Texas (2018–2022)
- NFL draft: 2023: undrafted

Career history
- Atlanta Falcons (2023)*
- * Offseason or practice squad member only

Awards and highlights
- Third-team All-C-USA (2022)

Austin Palmer Aune (/ˈɔːni/ AW-nee; born September 6, 1993) is an American former football quarterback. He is a former baseball player who was drafted by the New York Yankees in the second round of the 2012 MLB draft. He played six seasons in the minor leagues before being released. Aune then played college football for the North Texas Mean Green. He was the oldest starting quarterback in FBS football at the age of 29.

== Early life ==
Aune attended Argyle High School in Argyle, Texas. A two-sport star, he was the starting quarterback and also played shortstop on the baseball team. As a senior, he threw for 33 touchdowns and 3,411 yards while rushing for 9 touchdowns and 538 yards. A three-star quarterback prospect, he originally committed to TCU to play college football. But after being selected by the New York Yankees in the second round of the 2012 MLB draft, Aune was offered a $1 million signing bonus to sign for the Yankees and so he chose to play professional baseball over collegiate football.

== Professional baseball career ==
Aune played six seasons of minor league baseball in the New York Yankees' farm system. During his tenure in the minor leagues, he recorded 20 home runs and 148 RBIs. After bouncing between several High-A and Single-A teams and switching from shortstop to outfielder, Aune had a career batting average of .226 with 20 home runs and 147 RBI. On August 1, 2017, Aune was released by New York. In his time in the Yankees system, Aune appeared for the rookie-level Gulf Coast Yankees, Low-A Staten Island Yankees, Single-A Charleston RiverDogs, and High-A Tampa Yankees.

== College football career ==
=== North Texas ===
In 2018, months after being released by the Yankees, a 24-year-old Aune joined the Arkansas Razorbacks for their 2018 spring practice. He enrolled as a student, but the crowded quarterback room convinced him to transfer to North Texas instead.

==== 2018-2020 ====
Arriving at the University of North Texas in 2018, he redshirted his freshman year. In 2019, he served as the third-string quarterback behind Mason Fine and Jason Bean, completing 4 of 5 passes for 136 yards in two appearances at quarterback. During the 2020 season, he backed up Bean while making eight appearances and three starts.

==== 2021 ====
After starting the season as a backup to junior transfer Jace Ruder, Aune won the starting position after week 5 and lead the Mean Green from a 1–3 start to a 6–6 finish in order to become bowl eligible, including an upset win over #22 UTSA, before losing to the Miami RedHawks in the 2021 Frisco Football Classic.

==== 2022 ====
Going into the 2022 season, Aune maintained his starting position against a crowded quarterback roster including Memphis transfer Grant Gunnell, leading the Mean Green to a 7–5 record and earning Conference USA Offensive Player of the Week honors in week zero. During the 2022 Conference USA Championship Game, Aune set a school record for touchdown passes in a single season with 32, surpassing former teammate Mason Fine. Aune played his final career game in the 2022 Frisco Bowl, throwing for 238 yards and a touchdown in a 32–35 defeat. After the game, Aune declared for the 2023 NFL draft. Shortly after the end of the season, Aune changed his mind and entered his name in the NCAA transfer portal. On January 2, 2023, Aune withdrew from the transfer portal and redeclared for the upcoming NFL Draft. Aune finished his collegiate career with a 13–13 record as a starter, with 488 completions for 7,324 yards, 56 touchdowns, and 28 interceptions.

=== Statistics ===
Year	Team	Games			Passing								Rushing			
Year	Team	GP	GS	Record	Cmp	Att	Pct	Yds	Avg	TD	Int	Rtg	Att	Yds	Avg	TD
2018	North Texas	Redshirt														
2019	North Texas	2	0	0–0	4	5	80.0	136	27.2	1	0	374.5	0	0	0	0
2020	North Texas	8	3	1–2	101	185	54.6	1,650	8.9	13	4	148.4	27	29	1.1	2
2021	North Texas	13	9	5–4	151	295	51.2	1,991	6.7	9	9	111.8	80	325	4.1	3
2022	North Texas	14	14	7–7	232	411	56.4	3,547	8.6	33	15	148.1	44	52	1.2	1
Career		37	26	13–13	488	896	54.5	7,324	8.2	56	28	137.5	151	406	2.7	6

== Professional football career ==
Pre-draft measurables
Height	Weight	Arm length	Hand span	40-yard dash	10-yard split	20-yard split	20-yard shuttle	Three-cone drill	Vertical jump	Broad jump
6 ft 2 in (1.88 m)	215 lb (98 kg)	32 1/4 in (0.82 m)	10 1/4 in (0.26 m)	4.88 s	1.64 s	2.63 s	4.23 s	6.95 s	27 in (0.69 m)	9 ft 0 in (2.74 m)
All values from Pro Day

On May 1, 2023, Aune was invited to the Atlanta Falcons rookie minicamp. He signed with the team as an undrafted free agent on May 16, 2023. He was waived by the team on June 16.

== Personal life ==
Aune is the son of Greg and Karen Aune. Austin Aune married Kristin Massey in May 2021, and they have a daughter.
