= 2022 Sun Belt Conference football season =

- League: NCAA Division I Football Bowl Subdivision
- Sport: Football
- Duration: September 2, 2022 – December 3, 2022
- Teams: 14

2023 NFL draft
- Top draft pick: OT Nick Saldiveri, Old Dominion
- Picked by: New Orleans Saints, 103rd overall

Regular season
- East champions: Coastal Carolina; James Madison
- West champions: Troy; South Alabama

SBC Championship Game
- Date: December 3, 2022
- Venue: Veterans Memorial Stadium, Troy, Alabama
- Champions: Troy
- Runners-up: Coastal Carolina
- Finals MVP: QB Gunnar Watson, Troy

Seasons
- ← 2021 2023 →

2022 Sun Belt Conference football standings
	Conf.			Overall
Team	W		L	W		L
East Division
James Madison* x	6	–	2	8	–	3
Coastal Carolina xy	6	–	2	9	–	4
Marshall	5	–	3	9	–	4
Georgia Southern	3	–	5	6	–	7
Appalachian State	3	–	5	6	–	6
Georgia State	3	–	5	4	–	8
Old Dominion	2	–	6	3	–	9
West Division
No. 19 Troy xy$	7	–	1	12	–	2
South Alabama x	7	–	1	10	–	3
Southern Miss	4	–	4	7	–	6
Louisiana	4	–	4	6	–	7
Louisiana–Monroe	3	–	5	4	–	8
Texas State	2	–	6	4	–	8
Arkansas State	1	–	7	3	–	9
Championship: Troy 45, Coastal Carolina 26
$ – Conference champion; x – Division champion/co-champions; y – Championship game participant; * – Ineligible for postseason play due to FCS-to-FBS transition rules; Rankings from AP Poll

The 2022 Sun Belt Conference football season was the 22nd season of college football play for the Sun Belt Conference (SBC). The season began on September 2, 2022, and concluded with its conference championship game on December 3, 2022. It is part of the 2022 NCAA Division I FBS football season. The conference expanded to 14 football members for the 2022 season with the addition of 4 new member schools. The 14 members were divided into two divisions for play. The conference released its schedule on March 1, 2022.

== Conference expansion ==
Prior to the 2022 season, the SBC added four new schools as full members: Marshall, Old Dominion, and Southern Miss, previously from Conference USA, and James Madison, previously from the Colonial Athletic Association at the Division I FCS level. The initial intent was for the schools to begin playing in the conference starting no later that July 1, 2023. However, all four teams elected to join for the 2022 season, with the move officially announced with the release of the conference's 2022 schedule.

For the 2022 season, James Madison is ineligible for both the conference championship and for bowl games due to its transition from the FCS level to FBS level. Due to JMU meeting FBS scheduling requirements for the 2022 season, specifically five home games against FBS opponents, it was able to skip one year of the normal two-year transition process, making it eligible for both the SBC title and bowl games beginning with the 2023 season.

== Preseason ==
=== Preseason Media Poll ===
The Sun Belt released its preseason poll on July 25. Appalachian State was named the favorite to win the East Division, while Louisiana was named the favorite to win the West Division.

East
Predicted finish	Team	Votes (1st place)
1	Appalachian State	94 (10)
2	Coastal Carolina	77 (2)
3	Georgia State	68 (1)
4	Marshall	62
5	Georgia Southern	35 (1)
6	James Madison	31
7	Old Dominion	25

West
Predicted finish	Team	Votes (1st place)
1	Louisiana	95 (12)
2	South Alabama	79 (2)
3	Troy	76
4	Texas State	41
5	Southern Miss	40
6	Arkansas State	37
7	Louisiana–Monroe	24

=== Preseason All-Conference teams ===
- Offensive Player of the Year: Grayson McCall (Redshirt Junior, Coastal Carolina quarterback)
- Defensive Player of the Year: Josaiah Stewart, (Sophomore, Coastal Carolina defensive lineman)

Position	Player	Team
First Team Offense
QB	Grayson McCall	Coastal Carolina
RB	Rasheen Ali	Marshall
RB	Camerun Peoples	Appalachian State
OL	Willie Lampkin	Coastal Carolina
OL	Dalton Cooper	Texas State
OL	Austin Stidham	Troy
OL	Malik Sumter	Georgia State
OL	Cooper Hodges	Appalachian State
TE	Zack Kuntz	Old Dominion
WR	Ali Jennings III	Old Dominion
WR	Kris Thornton	James Madison
WR	Tez Johnson	Troy
First Team Defense
DL	Josaiah Stewart	Coastal Carolina
DL	Javon Solomon	Troy
DL	Zi'Yon Hill-Green	Louisiana
DL	Will Choloh	Troy
LB	Carlton Martial	Troy
LB	Blake Carroll	Georgia State
LB	Kivon Bennett	Arkansas State
DB	Darrell Luter Jr.	South Alabama
DB	D'Jordan Strong	Coastal Carolina
DB	Antavious Lane	Georgia State
DB	Eric Garror	Louisiana
DB	Keith Gallmon Jr.	South Alabama
First Team Special Teams
K	Seth Keller	Texas State
P	Rhys Byrns	Louisiana
RS	Johnnie Lang	Arkansas State
AP	Chris Smith	Louisiana

Position	Player	Team
Second Team Offense
QB	Chase Brice	Appalachian State
RB	Nate Noel	Appalachian State
RB	Tucker Gregg	Georgia State
OL	Travis Glover	Georgia State
OL	Kyle Hergel	Texas State
OL	Damion Daley	Appalachian State
OL	Pat Bartlett	Georgia State
OL	Nick Saldiveri	Old Dominion
TE	Aubry Payne	Georgia State
WR	Te'Vailance Hunt	Arkansas State
WR	Jalen Wayne	South Alabama
WR	Boogie Knight	Louisiana–Monroe
Second Team Defense
DL	Richard Jibunor	Troy
DL	Thomas Gore	Georgia State
DL	Jerrod Clark	Coastal Carolina
DL	Justin Ellis	Georgia Southern
LB	Nick Hampton	Appalachian State
LB	Abraham Beauplan	Marshall
LB	Andre Jones Jr.	Louisiana
LB	Trey Cobb	Appalachian State
DB	Steven Jones Jr.	Appalachian State
DB	Derrick Canteen	Georgia Southern
DB	Steven Gilmore	Marshall
DB	TJ Harris	Troy
Second Team Special Teams
K	Calum Sutherland	Louisiana–Monroe
P	Anthony Beck II	Georgia Southern
RS	Camron Harrell	Southern Miss
AP	Amare Jones	Georgia Southern

=== Individual awards ===
The following list contains Sun Belt players who were included on preseason watch lists for national awards.

Award	Head Coach/Player	School	Position	Ref
Lott Trophy	none			
Dodd Trophy	none			
Maxwell Award	Nate Noel	Appalachian State	RB	
Maxwell Award	Chase Brice	Appalachian State	QB	
Maxwell Award	Grayson McCall	Coastal Carolina	QB	
Maxwell Award	Rasheen Ali	Marshall	RB	
Maxwell Award	Blake Watson	Old Dominion	RB	
Davey O'Brien Award	Chase Brice	Appalachian State	QB	
Davey O'Brien Award	Grayson McCall	Coastal Carolina	QB	
Doak Walker Award	Rasheen Ali	Marshall	RB	
Doak Walker Award	Frank Gore Jr.	Southern Miss	RB	
Doak Walker Award	Gerald Green	Georgia Southern	RB	
Doak Walker Award	Tucker Gregg	Georgia State	RB	
Doak Walker Award	Johnnie Lang	Arkansas State	RB	
Doak Walker Award	Nate Noel	Appalachian State	RB	
Doak Walker Award	Camerun Peoples	Appalachian State	RB	
Doak Walker Award	Chris Smith	Louisiana	RB	
Doak Walker Award	Kimani Vidal	Troy	RB	
Doak Walker Award	Blake Watson	Old Dominion	RB	
Doak Walker Award	Jalen White	Georgia Southern	RB	
Doak Walker Award	Jamyest Williams	Georgia State	RB	
Biletnikoff Award	Corey Gammage	Marshall	WR	
Biletnikoff Award	Te'Vailance Hunt	Arkansas State	WR	
Biletnikoff Award	Ali Jennings III	Old Dominion	WR	
John Mackey Award	Johnny Lumpkin	Louisiana	TE	
Rimington Trophy	Willie Lampkin	Coastal Carolina	C	
Rimington Trophy	Malik Sumter	Georgia State	C	
Rimington Trophy	Jake Andrews	Troy	C	
Butkus Award	Carlton Martial	Troy	LB	
Jim Thorpe Award	Steven Jones Jr.	Appalachian State	CB	
Jim Thorpe Award	Antavious Lane	Georgia State	S	
Jim Thorpe Award	Darrell Luter Jr.	South Alabama	CB	

Award	Head Coach/Player	School	Position	Ref
Bronko Nagurski Trophy	Steven Jones Jr.	Appalachian State	CB	
Bronko Nagurski Trophy	Antavious Lane	Georgia State	S	
Bronko Nagurski Trophy	Darrell Luter Jr.	South Alabama	CB	
Bronko Nagurski Trophy	Carlton Martial	Troy	LB	
Bronko Nagurski Trophy	Javon Solomon	Troy	DE	
Bronko Nagurski Trophy	Josaiah Stewart	Coastal Carolina	DE	
Bronko Nagurski Trophy	D'Jordan Strong	Coastal Carolina	CB	
Outland Trophy	Will Choloh	Troy	DT	
Outland Trophy	A. J. Gillie	Louisiana	G	
Outland Trophy	Cooper Hodges	Appalachian State	OT	
Outland Trophy	Willie Lampkin	Coastal Carolina	C	
Outland Trophy	Austin Stidham	Troy	OT	
Outland Trophy	Malik Sumter	Georgia State	C	
Lou Groza Award	Seth Keller	Texas State	K	
Ray Guy Award	Anthony Beck II	Georgia Southern	P	
Ray Guy Award	Ethan Duane	Old Dominion	P	
Ray Guy Award	Jack Brooks	South Alabama	P	
Ray Guy Award	Mason Hunt	Southern Miss	P	
Ray Guy Award	Rhys Byrns	Louisiana	P	
Ray Guy Award	Ryan Hanson	Arkansas State	P	
Paul Hornung Award	Milan Tucker	Appalachian State	CB	
Paul Hornung Award	Rasheen Ali	Marshall	RB	
Wuerffel Trophy	Miller Gibbs	Appalachian State	TE	
Wuerffel Trophy	Eddie Smith	Arkansas State	S	
Wuerffel Trophy	Chris Smith	Louisiana	RB	
Wuerffel Trophy	Rasheen Ali	Marshall	RB	
Wuerffel Trophy	Tyriek Bell	Marshall	LB	
Wuerffel Trophy	B.R. Hatcher	Old Dominion	LS	
Wuerffel Trophy	Keith Gallmon Jr.	South Alabama	S	
Wuerffel Trophy	Swayze Bozeman	Southern Miss	LB	
Wuerffel Trophy	Micah Hilts	Texas State	TE	
Wuerffel Trophy	Craig Slocum Jr.	Troy	S	

Award	Head Coach/Player	School	Position	Ref
Walter Camp Award	Rasheen Ali	Marshall	RB	
Walter Camp Award	Grayson McCall	Coastal Carolina	QB	
Bednarik Award	Steven Jones Jr.	Appalachian State	CB	
Bednarik Award	Josaiah Stewart	Coastal Carolina	DE	
Bednarik Award	Abraham Beauplan	Marshall	LB	
Bednarik Award	Darrell Luter Jr.	South Alabama	CB	
Bednarik Award	Jordan Revels	Texas State	LB	
Bednarik Award	Carlton Martial	Troy	LB	
Rotary Lombardi Award	Abraham Beauplan	Marshall	LB	
Rotary Lombardi Award	Kivon Bennett	Arkansas State	LB	
Rotary Lombardi Award	Cooper Hodges	Appalachian State	OT	
Rotary Lombardi Award	Willie Lampkin	Coastal Carolina	C	
Rotary Lombardi Award	Carlton Martial	Troy	LB	
Rotary Lombardi Award	Javon Solomon	Troy	LB	
Patrick Mannelly Award	Kyle Davis	James Madison	LS	
Patrick Mannelly Award	Quentin Skinner	Troy	LS	
Patrick Mannelly Award	Travis Drosos	South Alabama	LS	
Earl Campbell Tyler Rose Award	Javen Banks	Texas State	WR	
Earl Campbell Tyler Rose Award	Calvin Hill	Texas State	RB	
Earl Campbell Tyler Rose Award	Te'Vailance Hunt	Arkansas State	WR	
Earl Campbell Tyler Rose Award	Amare Jones	Georgia Southern	WR	
Earl Campbell Tyler Rose Award	Tyler Page	Appalachian State	WR	
Manning Award	Chase Brice	Appalachian State	QB	
Manning Award	Grayson McCall	Coastal Carolina	QB	
Polynesian College Football Player Of The Year Award	Sione Tupou	Texas State	LB	
Johnny Unitas Golden Arm Award	Chase Brice	Appalachian State	QB	
Johnny Unitas Golden Arm Award	Jarret Doege	Troy	QB	
Johnny Unitas Golden Arm Award	Grayson McCall	Coastal Carolina	QB	
Johnny Unitas Golden Arm Award	Hayden Wolff	Old Dominion	QB	
Ted Hendricks Award				

== Head coaches ==
- On September 26, 2021, Georgia Southern fired head coach Chad Lunsford after 5 seasons with the team. Former USC head coach Clay Helton was announced as his permanent replacement, with Helton taking over duties at the conclusion of the 2021 season.
- On November 21, 2021, Troy fired head coach Chip Lindsey after 4 seasons with the team. Troy hired Kentucky co-defensive coordinator Jon Sumrall as his replacement.
- On November 28, 2021, Louisiana head coach Billy Napier announced that he was leaving the team to take the head coach position at Florida in the Southeastern Conference. Louisiana promoted their co-offensive coordinator Michael Desormeaux to replace Napier.

Team	Head coach	Previous Job	Years at school	Overall record	Sun Belt record	Sun Belt titles
Appalachian State	Shawn Clark	Appalachian State (Off. Line Coach)	3	20–7 (.741)	13–3 (.813)	0
Arkansas State	Butch Jones	Alabama (assistant coach)	2	86–64 (.573)	1–7 (.125)	0
Coastal Carolina	Jamey Chadwell	Coastal Carolina (Off. Coordinator)	5	90–54 (.625)	18–14 (.563)	1
Georgia Southern	Clay Helton	USC	1	46–24 (.657)	0–0 (–)	0
Georgia State	Shawn Elliott	South Carolina (Off. Line Coach)	6	31–35 (.470)	20–20 (.500)	0
James Madison	Curt Cignetti	Elon	4	100–31 (.763)	0–0 (–)	0
Louisiana	Michael Desormeaux	Louisiana (Co-Off. Coordinator)	1	1–0 (1.000)	0–0 (–)	0
Louisiana–Monroe	Terry Bowden	Clemson (Grad. Assistant)	2	179–122–2 (.594)	2–6 (.250)	0
Marshall	Charles Huff	Alabama (associate head coach)	2	7–6 (.538)	0–0 (–)	0
Old Dominion	Ricky Rahne	Penn State (Off. Coordinator)	3	6–7 (.462)	0–0 (–)	0
South Alabama	Kane Wommack	Indiana (Def. Coordinator)	2	5–7 (.417)	2–6 (.250)	0
Southern Miss	Will Hall	Tulane (Off. Coordinator)	2	59–29 (.670)	0–0 (–)	0
Texas State	Jake Spavital	West Virginia (Off. Coordinator)	4	9–27 (.250)	7–17 (.292)	0
Troy	Jon Sumrall	Kentucky (Co-Def. Coordinator)	1	0–0 (–)	0–0 (–)	0

=== Post-season changes ===
- On November 27, Texas State announced that they had fired head coach Jake Spavital. Spavital had posted a record of 13–35 over four years at the school. On December 7, Texas State announced Incarnate Word's head coach G. J. Kinne would take over as the new head coach for the 2023 season.
- On December 4, Jamey Chadwell announced that he was leaving Coastal Carolina to take over the head coaching position at Liberty. Coastal Carolina's defensive coordinator Chad Staggs took over as the interim head coach for the team's bowl game. Later on December 4, Coastal Carolina announced NC State offensive coordinator Tim Beck as the new head coach beginning in 2023.

== Rankings ==
		Pre	Wk 1	Wk 2	Wk 3	Wk 4	Wk 5	Wk 6	Wk 7	Wk 8	Wk 9	Wk 10	Wk 11	Wk 12	Wk 13	Wk 14	Final
Appalachian State	AP	RV		RV	RV												
Appalachian State	C	RV		RV	RV												
Appalachian State	CFP	Not released															
Arkansas State	AP																
Arkansas State	C																
Arkansas State	CFP	Not released															
Coastal Carolina	AP						RV	RV			RV	RV	23	23	RV		
Coastal Carolina	C	RV			RV	RV	RV	RV	RV	RV	RV	RV	23	23	RV	RV	
Coastal Carolina	CFP	Not released															
Georgia Southern	AP																
Georgia Southern	C																
Georgia Southern	CFP	Not released															
Georgia State	AP																
Georgia State	C																
Georgia State	CFP	Not released															
James Madison	AP					RV	RV	25	RV						RV	RV	
James Madison	C					RV	RV	RV							RV		
James Madison	CFP	Not released															
Louisiana	AP																
Louisiana	C	RV	RV														
Louisiana	CFP	Not released															
Louisiana–Monroe	AP																
Louisiana–Monroe	C																
Louisiana–Monroe	CFP	Not released															
Marshall	AP			RV													RV
Marshall	C			RV													
Marshall	CFP	Not released															
Old Dominion	AP																
Old Dominion	C																
Old Dominion	CFP	Not released															
South Alabama	AP									RV			RV	RV	RV	RV	
South Alabama	C									RV			RV	RV	RV	RV	RV
South Alabama	CFP	Not released															
Southern Miss	AP																
Southern Miss	C																
Southern Miss	CFP	Not released															
Texas State	AP																
Texas State	C																
Texas State	CFP	Not released															
Troy	AP										RV	RV	RV	RV	RV	23	19
Troy	C										RV	RV	RV	RV	RV	24	20
Troy	CFP	Not released														24	

Legend
	Improvement in ranking
	Drop in ranking
	Not ranked previous week
	No change in ranking from previous week
RV	Received votes but were not ranked in Top 25 of poll
т	Tied with team above or below also with this symbol

== Schedule ==
Index to colors and formatting
Sun Belt member won
Sun Belt member lost
Sun Belt teams in **bold**

All times Central time.

=== Week 1 ===
Date	Time	Visiting team	Home team	Site	TV	Result	Attendance	Ref.
September 2	6:00 p.m.	Virginia Tech	**Old Dominion**	S.B. Ballard Stadium • Norfolk, VA	ESPNU	**W** 20–17	21,944	
September 3	11:00 a.m.	North Carolina	**Appalachian State**	Kidd Brewer Stadium • Boone, NC	ESPNU	**L** 61–63	40,168	
September 3	2:30 p.m.	Norfolk State	**Marshall**	Joan C. Edwards Stadium • Huntington, WV	ESPN3	**W** 55–3	24,607	
September 3	3:00 p.m.	**Troy**	No. 21 Ole Miss	Vaught–Hemingway Stadium • Oxford, MS	SECN	**L** 10–28	60,533	
September 3	4:00 p.m.	Nicholls	**South Alabama**	Hancock Whitney Stadium • Mobile, AL	ESPN3	**W** 48–7	15,101	
September 3	4:30 p.m.	**Texas State**	Nevada	Mackay Stadium • Reno, NV	NSN/MWSN	**L** 14–38	13,260	
September 3	5:00 p.m.	Morgan State	**Georgia Southern**	Paulson Stadium • Statesboro, GA	ESPN3	**W** 59–7	15,183	
September 3	5:00 p.m.	Middle Tennessee	**James Madison**	Bridgeforth Stadium • Harrisonburg, VA	ESPN+	**W** 44–7	23,074	
September 3	6:00 p.m.	Army	**Coastal Carolina**	Brooks Stadium • Conway, SC	ESPN+	**W** 38–28	21,165	
September 3	6:00 p.m.	Grambling State	**Arkansas State**	Centennial Bank Stadium • Jonesboro, AR	ESPN3	**W** 58–3	17,893	
September 3	6:00 p.m.	No. 17 (FCS) Southeastern Louisiana	**Louisiana**	Cajun Field • Lafayette, LA (Cypress Mug)	ESPN+	**W** 24–7	16,812	
September 3	6:00 p.m.	Liberty	**Southern Miss**	M. M. Roberts Stadium • Hattiesburg, MS	ESPN+	**L** 27–29 ^{4OT}	24,051	
September 3	6:30 p.m.	**Georgia State**	South Carolina	Williams–Brice Stadium • Columbia, SC	ESPN+/SECN+	**L** 14–35	78,297	
September 3	7:00 p.m.	**Louisiana–Monroe**	Texas	Darrell K Royal–Texas Memorial Stadium • Austin, TX	LHN	**L** 10–52	94,873	
^{#}Rankings from AP Poll released prior to game. All times are in Central Time.

=== Week 2 ===
Date	Time	Visiting team	Home team	Site	TV	Result	Attendance	Ref.
September 10	11:00 a.m.	**Arkansas State**	No. 3 Ohio State	Ohio Stadium • Columbus, OH	BTN	**L** 12–45	100,067	
September 10	11:00 a.m.	**Southern Miss**	No. 15 Miami (FL)	Hard Rock Stadium • Miami Gardens, FL	ACCN	**L** 7–30	46,422	
September 10	11:00 a.m.	North Carolina	**Georgia State**	Center Parc Stadium • Atlanta, GA	ESPNU	**L** 28–35	17,687	
September 10	12:00 p.m.	**South Alabama**	Central Michigan	Kelly/Shorts Stadium • Mount Pleasant, MI	ESPN+	**W** 38–24	17,205	
September 10	1:30 pm	**Marshall**	No. 8 Notre Dame	Notre Dame Stadium • South Bend, IN	NBC	**W** 26–21	77,622	
September 10	2:30 p.m.	**Appalachian State**	No. 6 Texas A&M	Kyle Field • College Station, TX	ESPN2	**W** 17–14	92,664	
September 10	3:00 p.m.	Norfolk State	**James Madison**	Bridgeforth Stadium • Harrisonburg, VA	ESPN3	**W** 63–7	23,928	
September 10	5:00 p.m.	**Old Dominion**	East Carolina	Dowdy-Ficklen Stadium • Greenville, NC	ESPN+	**L** 21–39	36,853	
September 10	5:00 p.m.	Gardner-Webb	**Coastal Carolina**	Brooks Stadium • Conway, SC	ESPN+	**W** 31–27	12,261	
September 10	6:00 p.m.	Eastern Michigan	**Louisiana**	Cajun Field • Lafayette, LA	NFLN	**W** 49–21	15,352	
September 10	6:00 p.m.	FIU	**Texas State**	Bobcat Stadium • San Marcos, TX	ESPN+	**W** 41–12	18,757	
September 10	6:00 p.m.	Alabama A&M	**Troy**	Veterans Memorial Stadium • Troy, AL	ESPN3	**W** 38–17	26,189	
September 10	6:30 p.m.	**Georgia Southern**	Nebraska	Memorial Stadium • Lincoln, NE	FS1	**W** 45–42	86,862	
September 10	7:00 p.m.	Nicholls	**Louisiana–Monroe**	JPS Field at Malone Stadium • Monroe, LA	ESPN3	**W** 35–7	13,536	
^{#}Rankings from AP Poll released prior to game. All times are in Central Time.

=== Week 3 ===
Date	Time	Visiting team	Home team	Site	TV	Result	Attendance	Ref.
September 17	11:00 a.m.	**Texas State**	No. 17 Baylor	McLane Stadium • Waco, TX	FS1	**L** 7–42	45,597	
September 17	12:00 p.m.	Buffalo	**Coastal Carolina**	Brooks Stadium • Conway, SC	ESPN+	**W** 38–26	13,372	
September 17	1:00 p.m.	**South Alabama**	UCLA	Rose Bowl • Pasadena, CA	P12N	**L** 31–32	29,344	
September 17	1:00 p.m.	**Old Dominion**	Virginia	Scott Stadium • Charlottesville, VA	ACCN	**L** 14–16	40,556	
September 17	2:30 p.m.	**Troy**	**Appalachian State**	Kidd Brewer Stadium • Boone, NC	ESPN+	**APPST** 32–28	34,406	
September 17	2:30 p.m.	**Georgia Southern**	UAB	Protective Stadium • Birmingham, AL	Stadium	**L** 21–35	24,302	
September 17	3:00 p.m.	**Louisiana–Monroe**	No. 2 Alabama	Bryant–Denny Stadium • Tuscaloosa, AL	SECN	**L** 7–63	98,433	
September 17	4:00 p.m.	**Marshall**	Bowling Green	Doyt Perry Stadium • Bowling Green, OH	NFLN	**L** 31–34 ^{OT}	21,158	
September 17	6:00 p.m.	Northwestern State	**Southern Miss**	M. M. Roberts Stadium • Hattiesburg, MS	ESPN3	**W** 64–10	26,202	
September 17	6:00 p.m.	**Arkansas State**	Memphis	Liberty Bowl Memorial Stadium • Memphis, TN (Paint Bucket Bowl)	ESPN+	**L** 32–44	32,620	
September 17	6:00 p.m.	Charlotte	**Georgia State**	Center Parc Stadium • Atlanta, GA	ESPN+	**L** 41–42	16,433	
September 17	6:30 p.m.	**Louisiana**	Rice	Rice Stadium • Houston, TX	ESPN+	**L** 21–33	18,746	
^{#}Rankings from AP Poll released prior to game. All times are in Central Time.

=== Week 4 ===
Date	Time	Visiting team	Home team	Site	TV	Result	Attendance	Ref.
September 22	6:30 p.m.	**Coastal Carolina**	**Georgia State**	Center Parc Stadium • Atlanta, GA	ESPN2	**CCU** 41–24	13,467	
September 24	2:30 p.m.	**James Madison**	**Appalachian State**	Kidd Brewer Stadium • Boone, NC	ESPN+	**JMU** 32–28	33,248	
September 24	5:00 p.m.	**Arkansas State**	**Old Dominion**	S.B. Ballard Stadium • Norfolk, VA	ESPN+	**ODU** 29–26	20,655	
September 24	5:00 p.m.	Ball State	**Georgia Southern**	Paulson Stadium • Statesboro, GA	ESPN+	**W** 34–23	18,434	
September 24	6:00 p.m.	Louisiana Tech	**South Alabama**	Hancock Whitney Stadium • Mobile, AL	ESPN+	**W** 38–14	17,939	
September 24	6:00 p.m.	**Southern Miss**	Tulane	Yulman Stadium • New Orleans, LA (Battle for the Bell)	ESPN+	**W** 27–24	20,422	
September 24	6:00 p.m.	Houston Christian	**Texas State**	Bobcat Stadium • San Marcos, TX	ESPN3	**W** 34–0	16,237	
September 24	6:00 p.m.	**Marshall**	**Troy**	Veterans Memorial Stadium • Troy, AL	NFLN	**TROY** 16–7	27,514	
September 24	7:00 p.m.	**Louisiana**	**Louisiana–Monroe**	JPS Field at Malone Stadium • Monroe, LA (Battle on the Bayou)	ESPN+	**ULM** 21–17	19,077	
^{#}Rankings from AP Poll released prior to game. All times are in Central Time.

=== Week 5 ===
Date	Time	Visiting team	Home team	Site	TV	Result	Attendance	Ref.
October 1	11:00 a.m.	**Georgia State**	Army	Michie Stadium • West Point, NY	CBSSN	**W** 31–14	25,752	
October 1	12:30 p.m.	**Texas State**	**James Madison**	Bridgeforth Stadium • Harrisonburg, VA	ESPN+	**JMU** 40–13	25,188	
October 1	2:30 p.m.	Gardner-Webb	**Marshall**	Joan C. Edwards Stadium • Huntington, WV	ESPN+	**W** 28–7	19,845	
October 1	2:30 p.m.	The Citadel	**Appalachian State**	Kidd Brewer Stadium • Boone, NC	ESPN+	**W** 49–0	30,789	
October 1	4:00 p.m.	**South Alabama**	**Louisiana**	Cajun Field • Lafayette, LA	ESPN+	**USA** 20–17	20,671	
October 1	5:00 p.m.	Liberty	**Old Dominion**	S.B. Ballard Stadium • Norfolk, VA	ESPN+	**L** 24–38	18,368	
October 1	6:00 p.m.	**Louisiana–Monroe**	**Arkansas State**	Centennial Bank Stadium • Jonesboro, AR	ESPN+	**ASU** 45–28	18,172	
October 1	6:00 p.m.	**Troy**	Western Kentucky	Houchens Industries–L. T. Smith Stadium • Bowling Green, KY	ESPN+	**W** 34–27	20,168	
October 1	6:00 p.m.	**Georgia Southern**	**Coastal Carolina**	Brooks Stadium • Conway, SC	ESPN+	**CCU** 34–30	18,756	
^{#}Rankings from AP Poll released prior to game. All times are in Central Time.

=== Week 6 ===
Date	Time	Visiting team	Home team	Site	TV	Result	Attendance	Ref.
October 8	1:00 p.m.	**Georgia Southern**	**Georgia State**	Center Parc Stadium • Atlanta, GA (Modern Day Hate)	ESPN3	**GSU** 41–33	20,109	
October 8	6:00 p.m.	**James Madison**	**Arkansas State**	Centennial Bank Stadium • Jonesboro, AR	NFLN	**JMU** 42–20	20,083	
October 8	6:00 p.m.	**Appalachian State**	**Texas State**	Bobcat Stadium • San Marcos, TX	ESPN+	**TXST** 36–24	25,613	
October 8	6:00 p.m.	**Southern Miss**	**Troy**	Veterans Memorial Stadium • Troy, AL	ESPN+	**TROY** 27–10	26,017	
October 8	7:00 p.m.	**Coastal Carolina**	**Louisiana–Monroe**	JPS Field at Malone Stadium • Monroe, LA	ESPN+	**CCU** 28–21	18,448	
^{#}Rankings from AP Poll released prior to game. All times are in Central Time.

=== Week 7 ===
Date	Time	Visiting team	Home team	Site	TV	Result	Attendance	Ref.
October 12	6:30 p.m.	**Louisiana**	Marshall	Joan C. Edwards Stadium • Huntington, WV	ESPN2	**ULL** 23–13	19,905	
October 15	11:00 a.m.	**Old Dominion**	Coastal Carolina	Brooks Stadium • Conway, SC	ESPNU	**ODU** 49–21	16,814	
October 15	2:30 p.m.	**Texas State**	Troy	Veterans Memorial Stadium • Troy, AL	ESPN3	**TROY** 17–14	23,480	
October 15	3:00 p.m.	No. 25 **James Madison**	Georgia Southern	Paulson Stadium • Statesboro, GA	ESPN+	**GASO** 45–38	18,738	
October 15	6:00 p.m.	**Arkansas State**	Southern Miss	M. M. Roberts Stadium • Hattiesburg, MS	ESPN+	**USM** 20–19	27,042	
October 15	6:00 p.m.	**Louisiana–Monroe**	South Alabama	Hancock Whitney Stadium • Mobile, AL	NFLN	**SOAL** 41–34	15,459	
^{#}Rankings from AP Poll released prior to game. All times are in Central Time.

=== Week 8 ===
Date	Time	Visiting team	Home team	Site	TV	Result	Attendance	Ref.
October 19	6:30 p.m.	Georgia State	**Appalachian State**	Kidd Brewer Stadium • Boone, NC	ESPN2	**APPST** 42–17	31,757	
October 20	5:30 p.m.	Troy	**South Alabama**	Hancock Whitney Stadium • Mobile, AL (Battle for the Belt)	ESPNU	**TROY** 10–6	25,450	
October 22	12:00 p.m.	Louisiana–Monroe	Army	Michie Stadium • West Point, NY	CBSSN	**L** 24–48	30,132	
October 22	2:30 p.m.	Marshall	**James Madison**	Bridgeforth Stadium • Harrisonburg, VA	ESPN+	**MU** 26–12	26,159	
October 22	2:30 p.m.	Georgia Southern	**Old Dominion**	S.B. Ballard Stadium • Norfolk, VA	ESPN+	**GASO** 28–23	20,162	
October 22	4:00 p.m.	Arkansas State	**Louisiana**	Cajun Field • Lafayette, LA	ESPN+	**ULL** 38–18	15,017	
October 22	4:00 p.m.	Southern Miss	**Texas State**	Bobcat Stadium • San Marcos, TX	ESPN+	**USM** 20–14	16,318	
^{#}Rankings from AP Poll released prior to game. All times are in Central Time.

=== Week 9 ===
Date	Time	Visiting team	Home team	Site	TV	Result	Attendance	Ref.
October 27	6:30 p.m.	**Louisiana**	**Southern Miss**	M. M. Roberts Stadium • Hattiesburg, MS	ESPN2	**USM** 39–24	27,332	
October 29	3:00 p.m.	**Old Dominion**	**Georgia State**	Center Parc Stadium • Atlanta, GA	ESPN+	**GSU** 31–17	16,203	
October 29	3:30 p.m.	Robert Morris	**Appalachian State**	Kidd Brewer Stadium • Boone, NC	ESPN+	**W** 42–3	32,501	
October 29	4:00 p.m.	**South Alabama**	**Arkansas State**	Centennial Bank Stadium • Jonesboro, AR	ESPNU	**SOAL** 31–3	11,714	
October 29	7:00 p.m.	**Coastal Carolina**	**Marshall**	Joan C. Edwards Stadium • Huntington, WV	NFLN	**CCU** 24–13	24,954	
^{#}Rankings from AP Poll released prior to game. All times are in Central Time.

=== Week 10 ===
Date	Time	Visiting team	Home team	Site	TV	Result	Attendance	Ref.
November 3	6:30 p.m.	Appalachian State	**Coastal Carolina**	Brooks Stadium • Conway, SC	ESPN	**CCU** 35–28	21,224	
November 5	1:00 p.m.	Marshall	**Old Dominion**	S.B. Ballard Stadium • Norfolk, VA	ESPN+	**MU** 12–0	18,327	
November 5	2:00 p.m.	Georgia State	**Southern Miss**	M. M. Roberts Stadium • Hattiesburg, MS	ESPN+	**GSU** 42–14	22,128	
November 5	3:00 p.m.	South Alabama	**Georgia Southern**	Paulson Stadium • Statesboro, GA	ESPN+	**SOAL** 38–31	17,084	
November 5	4:00 p.m.	Texas State	**Louisiana–Monroe**	JPS Field at Malone Stadium • Monroe, LA	ESPN3	**ULM** 31–30	11,376	
November 5	4:00 p.m.	Troy	**Louisiana**	Cajun Field • Lafayette, LA	ESPN+	**TROY** 23–17	7,888	
November 5	6:30 p.m.	James Madison	Louisville	Cardinal Stadium • Louisville, KY	ESPNU	**L** 10–34	42,157	
^{#}Rankings from AP Poll released prior to game. All times are in Central Time.

=== Week 11 ===
Date	Time	Visiting team	Home team	Site	TV	Result	Attendance	Ref.
November 10	6:30 p.m.	**Georgia Southern**	Louisiana	Cajun Field • Lafayette, LA	ESPN2	**ULL** 36–17	11,512	
November 12	12:00 p.m.	**James Madison**	Old Dominion	S.B. Ballard Stadium • Norfolk, VA (Oyster Bowl)	ESPN+	**JMU** 37–3	21,934	
November 12	12:00 p.m.	**Louisiana–Monroe**	Georgia State	Center Parc Stadium • Atlanta, GA	ESPN+	**ULM** 31–28	12,241	
November 12	2:00 p.m.	UMass	Arkansas State	Centennial Bank Stadium • Jonesboro, AR	ESPN3	**W** 35–33	14,354	
November 12	2:30 p.m.	**Appalachian State**	Marshall	Joan C. Edwards Stadium • Huntington, WV	ESPN+	**MU** 28–21	24,312	
November 12	2:30 p.m.	Army	Troy	Veterans Memorial Stadium • Troy, AL	NFLN	**W** 10–9	31,010	
November 12	4:00 p.m.	**Texas State**	South Alabama	Hancock Whitney Stadium • Mobile, AL	ESPN+	**SOAL** 38–21	14,518	
November 12	6:30 p.m.	**Southern Miss**	Coastal Carolina	Brooks Stadium • Conway, SC	ESPNU	**CCU** 26–23	16,203	
^{#}Rankings from AP Poll released prior to game. All times are in Central Time.

=== Week 12 ===
Date	Time	Visiting team	Home team	Site	TV	Result	Attendance	Ref.
November 19	12:00 p.m.	**Louisiana**	No. 19 Florida State	Doak Campbell Stadium • Tallahassee, FL	ACCRSN	**L** 17–49	58,597	
November 19	2:00 p.m.	**Georgia State**	**James Madison**	Bridgeforth Stadium • Harrisonburg, VA	ESPN+	**JMU** 42–40	20,055	
November 19	2:30 p.m.	**Old Dominion**	**Appalachian State**	Kidd Brewer Stadium • Boone, NC	ESPN+	**APPST** 27–14	32,096	
November 19	3:30 p.m.	**South Alabama**	**Southern Miss**	M. M. Roberts Stadium • Hattiesburg, MS	NFLN	**SOAL** 27–20	24,032	
November 19	3:30 p.m.	**Louisiana–Monroe**	**Troy**	Veterans Memorial Stadium • Troy, AL	ESPN+	**TROY** 34–16	23,864	
November 19	5:00 p.m.	**Arkansas State**	**Texas State**	Bobcat Stadium • San Marcos, TX	ESPN3	**TXST** 16–13	13,287	
November 19	6:00 p.m.	**Marshall**	**Georgia Southern**	Paulson Stadium • Statesboro, GA	ESPN+	**MU** 23–10	16,153	
~~November 19~~	~~3:30 p.m.~~	~~**Coastal Carolina**~~	~~Virginia~~	~~Scott Stadium~~ • ~~Charlottesville, VA~~	~~ACCRSN~~	Canceled due to the University of Virginia shooting		
^{#}Rankings from AP Poll released prior to game. All times are in Central Time.

=== Week 13 ===
Date	Time	Visiting team	Home team	Site	TV	Result	Attendance	Ref.
November 26	11:00 a.m.	Coastal Carolina	James Madison	Bridgeforth Stadium • Harrisonburg, VA	ESPNU	**JMU** 47–7	19,393	
November 26	11:00 a.m.	Georgia State	Marshall	Joan C. Edwards Stadium • Huntington, WV	ESPN+	**MU** 28–23	17,427	
November 26	11:00 a.m.	Old Dominion	South Alabama	Hancock Whitney Stadium • Mobile, AL	ESPN+	**SOAL** 27–20	11,407	
November 26	2:30 p.m.	Troy	Arkansas State	Centennial Bank Stadium • Jonesboro, AR	ESPNU	**TROY** 48–19	9,376	
November 26	4:00 p.m.	Louisiana	Texas State	Bobcat Stadium • San Marcos, TX	ESPN+	**ULL** 41–13	15,035	
November 26	4:00 p.m.	Southern Miss	Louisiana–Monroe	JPS Field at Malone Stadium • Monroe, LA	ESPN+	**USM** 20–10	4,465	
November 26	5:00 p.m.	Appalachian State	Georgia Southern	Paulson Stadium • Statesboro, GA (rivalry)	ESPN+	**GASO** 51–48 ^{2OT}	18,683	
^{#}Rankings from AP Poll released prior to game. All times are in Central Time.

=== Championship Game ===
==== Week 15 (Sun Belt Championship Game) ====
Date	Time	Visiting team	Home team	Site	TV	Result	Attendance	Ref.
December 3	2:30 p.m.	**Coastal Carolina**	**Troy**	Veterans Memorial Stadium • Troy, AL	ESPN	**TROY** 45–26	21,554	
^{#}Rankings from AP Poll released prior to game. All times are in Central Time.

== Postseason ==
=== Bowl Games ===
Legend
Sun Belt win
Sun Belt loss

Bowl game	Date	Site	Television	Time (CST)	Sun Belt team	Opponent	Score	Attendance
Cure Bowl	December 16	Exploria Stadium • Orlando, FL	ESPN	2:30 p.m.	No. 24 Troy	No. 25 UTSA	W 18–12	11,911
LendingTree Bowl	December 17	Hancock Whitney Stadium • Mobile, AL	ESPN	4:45 p.m.	Southern Miss	Rice	W 38–24	20,512
Myrtle Beach Bowl	December 19	Brooks Stadium • Conway, SC	ESPN	1:30 p.m.	Marshall	UConn	W 28–14	12,023
New Orleans Bowl	December 21	Caesars Superdome • New Orleans, LA	ESPN	8:00 p.m.	South Alabama	Western Kentucky	L 23–44	13,456
Independence Bowl	December 23	Independence Stadium • Shreveport, LA	ESPN	2:00 p.m.	Louisiana	Houston	L 16–23	23,410
Camellia Bowl	December 27	Cramton Bowl • Montgomery, AL	ESPN	11:00 a.m.	Georgia Southern	Buffalo	L 21–23	15,322
Birmingham Bowl	December 27	Protective Stadium • Birmingham, AL	ESPN	5:45 p.m.	Coastal Carolina	East Carolina	L 53–29	

Rankings are from Final CFP rankings. All times Central Time Zone.

=== Selection of teams ===
- Bowl eligible (7): Coastal Carolina, Georgia Southern, Louisiana, Marshall, South Alabama, Southern Miss, Troy
- Bowl ineligible (7): Appalachian State (Note: Although Appalachian State had a 6–6 record, they were not bowl eligible as they had more than one win against FCS level teams. Only one win against an FCS opponent may count towards bowl eligibility under NCAA rules.), Arkansas State, Georgia State, James Madison (Note: James Madison was not bowl eligible due to NCAA rules regarding teams transitioning between the FCS and FBS levels), Louisiana–Monroe, Old Dominion, Texas State

== Sun Belt Records against other conferences ==
2022–2023 records against non-conference foes:

Regular season

Power Five Conferences	Record
ACC	1–5
Big 12	0–2
Big Ten	1–2
BYU/Notre Dame	1–0
Pac-12	0–1
SEC	1–2
Power 5 Total	4–12
Other FBS Conferences	Record
American	1–2
C–USA	4–3
Independents (Excluding BYU/Notre Dame)	2–3
MAC	4–1
Mountain West	0–1
Other FBS Total	11–10
FCS Opponents	Record
Football Championship Subdivision	13–0
Total Non-Conference Record	28–22

Postseason

Power Five Conferences	Record
ACC	0–0
Big 12	0–0
Big Ten	0–0
BYU/Notre Dame	0–0
Pac-12	0–0
SEC	0–0
Power 5 Total	0–0
Other FBS Conferences	Record
American	0–2
C–USA	2–1
Independents (Excluding BYU/Notre Dame)	1–0
MAC	0–1
Mountain West	0–0
Other FBS Total	3–4
Total Bowl Record	3–4

=== Sun Belt vs Power 5 matchups ===
This is a list of games the Sun Belt has scheduled versus power conference teams (ACC, Big 10, Big 12, Pac-12, BYU, Notre Dame and SEC). All rankings are from the current AP Poll at the time of the game.

Date	Conference	Visitor	Home	Site	Score
September 2	ACC	Virginia Tech	Old Dominion	S.B. Ballard Stadium • Norfolk, VA	W 20–17
September 3	ACC	North Carolina	Appalachian State	Kidd Brewer Stadium • Boone, NC	L 61–63
September 3	SEC	Troy	No. 21 Ole Miss	Vaught–Hemingway Stadium • Oxford, MS	L 10–28
September 3	SEC	Georgia State	South Carolina	Williams–Brice Stadium • Columbia, SC	L 14–35
September 3	Big 12	Louisiana–Monroe	Texas	Darrell K Royal–Texas Memorial Stadium • Austin, TX	L 10–52
September 10	Big Ten	Arkansas State	No. 3 Ohio State	Ohio Stadium • Columbus, OH	L 12–45
September 10	ACC	Southern Miss	No. 15 Miami (FL)	Hard Rock Stadium • Miami Gardens, FL	L 7–30
September 10	ACC	North Carolina	Georgia State	Center Parc Stadium • Atlanta, GA	L 28–35
September 10	Independent	Marshall	No. 8 Notre Dame	Notre Dame Stadium • South Bend, IN	W 26–21
September 10	SEC	Appalachian State	No. 6 Texas A&M	Kyle Field • College Station, TX	W 17–14
September 10	Big Ten	Georgia Southern	Nebraska	Memorial Stadium • Lincoln, NE	W 45–42
September 17	Big 12	Texas State	No. 17 Baylor	McLane Stadium • Waco, TX	L 7–42
September 17	Pac-12	South Alabama	UCLA	Rose Bowl • Pasadena, CA	L 31–32
September 17	ACC	Old Dominion	Virginia	Scott Stadium • Charlottesville, VA	L 14–16
September 17	SEC	Louisiana–Monroe	No. 2 Alabama	Bryant–Denny Stadium • Tuscaloosa, AL	L 7–63
November 5	ACC	James Madison	Louisville	Cardinal Stadium • Louisville, KY	L 10–34
November 19	ACC	Louisiana	Florida State	Daok Campbell Stadium • Tallahassee, FL	L 17–49
~~November 19~~	~~ACC~~	~~Coastal Carolina~~	~~Virginia~~	~~Scott Stadium~~ • ~~Charlottesville, VA~~	

=== Sun Belt vs Group of Five matchups ===
The following games include Sun Belt teams competing against teams from the American, C-USA, MAC, or Mountain West.

Date	Conference	Visitor	Home	Site	Score
September 3	Mountain West	Texas State	Nevada	Mackay Stadium • Reno, NV	L 14–38
September 3	C-USA	Middle Tennessee	James Madison	Bridgeforth Stadium • Harrisonburg, VA	W 44–7
September 10	MAC	South Alabama	Central Michigan	Kelly/Shorts Stadium • Mount Pleasant, MI	W 38–24
September 10	American	Old Dominion	East Carolina	Dowdy–Ficklen Stadium • Greenville, NC	L 21–39
September 10	MAC	Eastern Michigan	Louisiana	Cajun Field • Lafayette, LA	W 49–21
September 10	C-USA	FIU	Texas State	Bobcat Stadium • San Marcos, TX	W 41–12
September 17	MAC	Buffalo	Coastal Carolina	Brooks Stadium • Conway, SC	W 38–26
September 17	C-USA	Georgia Southern	UAB	Protective Stadium • Birmingham, AL	L 21–35
September 17	MAC	Marshall	Bowling Green	Doyt Perry Stadium • Bowling Green, OH	L 31–34 ^{OT}
September 17	American	Arkansas State	Memphis	Liberty Bowl Memorial Stadium • Memphis, TN (Paint Bucket Bowl)	L 32–44
September 17	C-USA	Charlotte	Georgia State	Center Parc Stadium • Atlanta, GA	L 41–42
September 17	C-USA	Louisiana	Rice	Rice Stadium • Houston, TX	L 21–33
September 24	MAC	Ball State	Georgia Southern	Paulson Stadium • Statesboro, GA	W 34–23
September 24	C-USA	Louisiana Tech	South Alabama	Hancock Whitney Stadium • Mobile, AL	W 38–14
September 24	American	Southern Miss	Tulane	Yulman Stadium • New Orleans, LA (Battle for the Bell)	W 27–24
October 1	C-USA	Troy	Western Kentucky	Houchens Industries–L. T. Smith Stadium • Bowling Green, KY	W 34–27

=== Sun Belt vs FBS independents matchups ===
The following games include Sun Belt teams competing against FBS Independents, which includes Army, Liberty, New Mexico State, UConn, or UMass.

Date	Visitor	Home	Site	Score
September 3	Army	Coastal Carolina	Brooks Stadium • Conway, SC	W 38–28
September 3	Liberty	Southern Miss	M. M. Roberts Stadium • Hattiesburg, MS	L 27–29 ^{4OT}
October 1	Georgia State	Army	Michie Stadium • West Point, NY	W 31–14
October 1	Liberty	Old Dominion	S.B. Ballard Stadium • Norfolk, VA	L 24–38
October 22	Louisiana–Monroe	Army	Michie Stadium • West Point, NY	L 24–48
November 12	UMass	Arkansas State	Centennial Bank Stadium • Jonesboro, AR	W 35–33
November 12	Army	Troy	Veterans Memorial Stadium • Troy, AL	W 10–9

=== Sun Belt vs FCS matchups ===
The following games include Sun Belt teams competing against FCS schools.

Date	Visitor	Home	Site	Score
September 3	Norfolk State	Marshall	Joan C. Edwards Stadium • Huntington, WV	W 55–3
September 3	Nicholls	South Alabama	Hancock Whitney Stadium • Mobile, AL	W 48–7
September 3	Morgan State	Georgia Southern	Paulson Stadium • Statesboro, GA	W 59–7
September 3	Grambling State	Arkansas State	Centennial Bank Stadium • Jonesboro, AR	W 58–3
September 3	Southeastern Louisiana	Louisiana	Cajun Field • Lafayette, LA (Cypress Mug)	W 24–7
September 10	Norfolk State	James Madison	Bridgeforth Stadium • Harrisonburg, VA	W 63–7
September 10	Gardner-Webb	Coastal Carolina	Brooks Stadium • Conway, SC	W 31–27
September 10	Alabama A&M	Troy	Veterans Memorial Stadium • Troy, AL	W 38–17
September 10	Nicholls	Louisiana–Monroe	JPS Field at Malone Stadium • Monroe, LA	W 35–7
September 17	Northwestern State	Southern Miss	M. M. Roberts Stadium • Hattiesburg, MS	W 64–10
September 24	Houston Christian	Texas State	Bobcat Stadium • San Marcos, TX	W 34–0
October 1	The Citadel	Appalachian State	Kidd Brewer Stadium • Boone, NC	W 49–0
October 1	Gardner-Webb	Marshall	Joan C. Edwards Stadium • Huntington, WV	W 28–7
October 29	Robert Morris	Appalachian State	Kidd Brewer Stadium • Boone, NC	W 42–3

== Home game attendance ==
Team	Stadium	Capacity	Game 1	Game 2	Game 3	Game 4	Game 5	Game 6	Game 7	Total	Average	% of Capacity
Appalachian State	Kidd Brewer Stadium	30,000	**40,168** †	**34,406**	**33,248**	**30,789**	**31,757**	**32,501**	**32,096**	234,965	**33,566**	111.8%
Arkansas State	Centennial Bank Stadium	30,406	17,893	18,172	20,083†	11,714	14,354	9,376		91,592	15,265	50.2%
Coastal Carolina	Brooks Stadium	21,000	**21,165**	12,261	13,372	18,756	16,814	**21,224** †	16,203	119,795	17,113	81.4%
Georgia Southern	Paulson Stadium	25,000	15,183	18,434	18,738†	17,084	16,153	18,683		104,275	17,379	69.5%
Georgia State	Center Parc Stadium	24,333	17,687	16,433	13,467	20,109†	16,203	12,241		96,140	16,023	65.8%
James Madison	Bridgeforth Stadium	24,877	23,074	23,928	**25,188**	**26,159** †	20,055	19,393		137,804	22,967	92.3%
Louisiana	Cajun Field	41,426	16,812	18,079	20,671†	15,017	7,888	11,512		89,979	14,997	36.2%
Louisiana–Monroe	Malone Stadium	27,617	13,536	19,077†	18,448	11,376	4,465			66,902	13,380	58.4%
Marshall	Joan C. Edwards Stadium	38,227	24,607	19,845	19,905	24,954†	24,312	17,427		131,131	21,855	57.1%
Old Dominion	S. B. Ballard Stadium	21,944	**21,944** †	20,655	18,368	20,162	18,327	21,934		121,390	20,232	92.1%
South Alabama	Hancock Whitney Stadium	25,450	15,101	17,939	15,459	**25,450** †	14,518	11,407		99,874	16,645	65.4%
Southern Miss	M. M. Roberts Stadium	36,000	24,051	26,202	25,765	27,332†	22,128	24,032		150,787	25,131	69.8%
Texas State	Jim Wacker Field at Bobcat Stadium	30,008	18,757	16,237	25,613†	16,318	13,287	15,035		105,247	17,541	58.4%
Troy	Veterans Memorial Stadium	30,470	26,189	27,514	26,017	23,480	**31,010** †	23,864		158,074	26,346	86.4%

Bold – At or Exceeded capacity
†Season High

== Awards and honors ==
=== Player of the week honors ===
Week	Offensive			Defensive			Special Teams		
Week	Player	Team	Position	Player	Team	Position	Player	Team	Position
Week 1 (September 5)	Chase Brice	Appalachian State	QB	Jason Henderson	Old Dominion	LB	Eric Garror	Louisiana	RS
Week 2 (September 12)	Kyle Vantrease	Georgia Southern	QB	Jalen McLeod	Appalachian State	LB	Matthew McDoom	Coastal Carolina	RS
Week 3 (September 19)	Christian Horn	Appalachian State	WR	Nick Ross	Appalachian State	DB	Natrone Brooks	Southern Miss	RS
Week 4 (September 26)	Todd Centeio	James Madison	QB	Carlton Martial	Troy	LB	Caullin Lacy	South Alabama	RS
Week 5 (October 3)	Grayson McCall	Coastal Carolina	QB	Carlton Martial (2)	Troy	LB	Johnnie Lang Jr.	Arkansas State	RS
Week 6 (October 10)	Todd Centeio (2)	James Madison	QB	Troy Spears	Texas State	S	Seth Keller	Texas State	K
Week 7 (October 17)	Kyle Vantrease (2)	Georgia Southern	QB	Tre Hawkins	Old Dominion	DB	Kenneth Almendares	Louisiana	K
Week 8 (October 24)	Ben Wooldridge	Louisiana	QB	Owen Porter	Marshall	DL	Mike Rivers	Troy	P
Week 9 (October 31)	La'Damian Webb	South Alabama	RB	Shane Bruce	Coastal Carolina	LB	Evan Crenshaw	Coastal Carolina	P
Week 10 (November 7)	La'Damian Webb (2)	South Alabama	RB	Carlton Martial (3)	Troy	LB	Rece Verhoff	Marshall	K
Week 11 (November 14)	Todd Centeio (3)	James Madison	QB	Carlton Martial (4)	Troy	LB	Kenneth Almendares (2)	Louisiana	K
Week 12 (November 21)	Kimani Vidal	Troy	RB	Jaden Voisin	South Alabama	DB	Seth Keller (2)	Texas State	K
Week 13 (November 28)	Todd Centeio (4)	James Madison	QB	Reddy Steward	Troy	DB	Alex Raynor	Georgia Southern	K

=== Sun Belt individual awards ===
The following individuals received postseason honors as voted by the Sun Belt Conference football coaches at the end of the season.

Award	Player	School
Player of the Year	Grayson McCall	Coastal Carolina
Offensive Player of the Year	Todd Centeio	James Madison
Defensive Player of the Year	Carlton Martial	Troy
Freshman Player of the Year	Jared Brown	Coastal Carolina
Newcomer of the Year	Todd Centeio	James Madison
Coach of the Year	Jon Sumrall	Troy

=== All-Conference teams ===
The following players were selected as part of the Sun Belt's All-Conference Teams.

Position	Player	Team
First Team Offense
WR	Jamari Thrash	Georgia State
WR	Kris Thornton	James Madison
WR	Ali Jennings III	Old Dominion
OL	Cooper Hodges	Appalachian State
OL	Austin Stidham	Troy
OL	Willie Lampkin	Coastal Carolina
OL	Jake Andrews	Troy
OL	Anderson Hardy	Appalachian State
TE	Seydou Traore	Arkansas State
QB	Grayson McCall	Coastal Carolina
RB	Khalan Laborn	Marshall
RB	La'Damian Webb	South Alabama
First Team Defense
DL	T.J. Jackson	Troy
DL	Zi'Yon Hill-Green	Louisiana
DL	Owen Porter	Marshall
DL	Will Choloh	Troy
DL	Isaac Ukwu	James Madison
LB	Carlton Martial	Troy
LB	Jason Henderson	Old Dominion
LB	Nick Hampton	Appalachian State
DB	Yam Banks	South Alabama
DB	Micah Abraham	Marshall
DB	Reddy Steward	Troy
DB	Bralen Trahan	Louisiana
First Team Specialists
K	Dominic Zvada	Arkansas State
P	Rhys Byrns	Louisiana
RS	Eric Garror	Louisiana
AP	Frank Gore Jr.	Southern Miss

Position	Player	Team
Second Team Offense
WR	Jalen Wayne	South Alabama
WR	Tyrone Howell	Louisiana–Monroe
WR	Khaleb Hood	Georgia Southern
OL	Khalil Crowder	Georgia Southern
OL	Pat Bartlett	Georgia State
OL	Nick Saldiveri	Old Dominion
OL	Malik Sumter	Georgia State
OL	Nick Kidwell	James Madison
TE	Henry Pearson	Appalachian State
QB	Todd Centeio	James Madison
RB	Kimani Vidal	Troy
RB	Frank Gore Jr.	Southern Miss
Second Team Defense
DL	Levi Bell	Texas State
DL	James Carpenter	James Madison
DL	Richard Jibunor	Troy
DL	Jamare Edwards	James Madison
DL	Josaiah Stewart	Coastal Carolina
LB	Marques Watson-Trent	Georgia Southern
LB	Andre Jones Jr.	Louisiana
LB	Jourdan Quibodeaux	Louisiana
DB	Steven Jones Jr.	Appalachian State
DB	Quavian White	Georgia State
DB	Steven Gilmore	Marshall
DB	Lance Boykin	Coastal Carolina
Second Team Specialists
K	Diego Guajardo	South Alabama
P	Devyn McCormick	Louisiana–Monroe
RS	Johnnie Lang Jr.	Arkansas State
AP	Johnnie Lang Jr.	Arkansas State

Position	Player	Team
Third Team Offense
WR	Jason Brownlee	Southern Miss
WR	Sam Pinckney	Coastal Carolina
WR	Michael Jefferson	Louisiana
OL	James Jackson	South Alabama
OL	Kyle Hergel	Texas State
OL	Caleb Kelly	Georgia Southern
OL	Isaiah Helms	Appalachian State
OL	Antwine Loper	Coastal Carolina
TE	Jacob Jenkins	Coastal Carolina
QB	Kyle Vantrease	Georgia Southern
RB	Percy Agyei-Obese	James Madison
RB	Jalen White	Georgia Southern
Third Team Defense
DL	Kivon Bennett	Arkansas State
DL	Jerrod Clark	Coastal Carolina
DL	Justin Ellis	Georgia Southern
DL	Javon Solomon	Troy
LB	Taurus Jones	James Madison
LB	JT Killen	Coastal Carolina
LB	Santrell Latham	Southern Miss
DB	Jay Stanley	Southern Miss
DB	Malik Shorts	Southern Miss
DB	Darrell Luter Jr.	South Alabama
DB	Antavious Lane	Georgia State
DB	Derrick Canteen	Georgia Southern
Third Team Specialists
K	Briggs Bourgeois	Southern Miss
P	Mason Hunt	Southern Miss
RS	Milan Tucker	Appalachian State
AP	La'Damian Webb	South Alabama

== NFL draft ==
The following list includes all Sun Belt players who were drafted in the 2023 NFL draft.

Player	Position	School	Draft Round	Round Pick	Overall Pick	Team
Nick Saldiveri	OT	Old Dominion	4	1	103	New Orleans Saints
Jake Andrews	C	Troy	4	5	107	New England Patriots
Darrell Luter Jr.	CB	South Alabama	5	20	155	San Francisco 49ers
Nick Hampton	LB	Appalachian State	5	26	161	Los Angeles Rams
Eric Scott Jr.	CB	Southern Miss	6	1	178	Dallas Cowboys
Tre Hawkins	CB	Old Dominion	6	32	209	New York Giants
Zack Kuntz	TE	Old Dominion	7	3	220	New York Jets
Cooper Hodges	OT	Appalachian State	7	9	226	Jacksonville Jaguars
Andre Jones Jr.	LB	Louisiana	7	16	233	Washington Commanders
