= 2022 Army Black Knights football team =

American college football season

2022 Army Black Knights football
- Conference: Independent
- Record: 6–6
- Head coach: Jeff Monken (9th season)
- Offensive coordinator: Brent Davis (9th season)
- Offensive scheme: Triple option
- Defensive coordinator: Nate Woody (3rd season)
- Base defense: 3–4
- Captains: Connor Bishop; Marquel Broughton
- Home stadium: Michie Stadium

2022 NCAA Division I FBS independents football records
	Conf.			Overall
Team	W		L	W		L
No. 18 Notre Dame		–		9	–	4
Liberty		–		8	–	5
BYU		–		8	–	5
New Mexico State		–		7	–	6
Army		–		6	–	6
UConn		–		6	–	7
UMass		–		1	–	11
Rankings from AP Poll

The 2022 Army Black Knights football team represented the United States Military Academy in the 2022 NCAA Division I FBS football season. The Black Knights were led by ninth-year head coach Jeff Monken and played their home games at Michie Stadium in West Point, New York. They competed as an independent. The Black Knights finished the season with a record of 6–6, beating Navy but losing possession of the Commander-in-Chief's Trophy after a loss to Air Force. They were not invited to a bowl as only five of their six wins counted for bowl eligibility, with the sixth coming against their second FCS opponent of the year.

== Schedule ==
Date	Time	Opponent	Site	TV	Result	Attendance
September 3	7:00 p.m.	at Coastal Carolina	Brooks Stadium; Conway, SC	ESPN+	L 28–38	21,196
September 10	12:00 p.m.	UTSA	Michie Stadium; West Point, NY	CBSSN	L 38–41 ^{OT}	23,551
September 17	12:00 p.m.	No. 7 (FCS) Villanova	Michie Stadium; West Point, NY	CBSSN	W 49–10	32,320
October 1	12:00 p.m.	Georgia State	Michie Stadium; West Point, NY	CBSSN	L 14–31	25,752
October 8	7:30 p.m.	at No. 15 Wake Forest	Truist Field at Wake Forest; Winston-Salem, NC	ACCRSN	L 10–45	32,524
October 15	12:00 p.m.	Colgate	Michie Stadium; West Point, NY	CBSSN	W 42–17	28,896
October 22	12:00 p.m.	Louisiana–Monroe	Michie Stadium; West Point, NY	CBSSN	W 48–24	30,132
November 5	11:30 a.m.	vs. Air Force	Globe Life Field; Arlington, TX (Commander-in-Chief's Trophy, Lockheed Martin Commanders Classic)	CBS	L 7–13	33,912
November 12	3:30 p.m.	at Troy	Veterans Memorial Stadium; Troy, AL	NFLN	L 9–10	31,010
November 19	12:00 p.m.	UConn	Michie Stadium; West Point, NY	CBSSN	W 34–17	31,229
November 26	12:00 p.m.	at UMass	Warren McGuirk Alumni Stadium; Hadley, MA	ESPN+	W 44–7	10,119
December 10	3:00 p.m.	vs. Navy	Lincoln Financial Field; Philadelphia, PA (Army–Navy Game, Commander-in-Chief's Trophy)	CBS	W 20–17 ^{2OT}	69,117
Rankings from AP Poll and CFP Rankings (after November 1) released prior to game; All times are in Eastern time

== Game summaries ==
=== At Coastal Carolina ===
Army Black Knights at Coastal Carolina Chanticleers

Quarter	1	2	3	4	Total
Black Knights	7	7	7	7	28
Chanticleers	7	7	10	14	38

at Brooks Stadium, Conway, SC

- Date: September 3, 2022
- Game time: 7:00 p.m. EDT
- Game weather: Sunny
- Game attendance: 21,165
- Referee: Ted Pitts
- TV announcers (ESPN+): Kyle Rush (play-by-play) & Nate Ross (analyst)
- ESPN – McCall throws for three TDs in Coastal Carolina's win /// Box Score, Army at Coastal Carolina /// Army Pregame Notes /// Coastal Carolina Pregame Notes /// Postgame Notes

Game information

First quarter

- (07:25) ARMY TD – Tyrell Robinson 70-yard rush, Quinn Maretzki kick
  Drive: 4 plays, 84 yards, 1:43; Army 7–0
- (00:54) CCU TD – Reese White 6-yard pass from Grayson McCall, Kade Hensley kick
  Drive: 12 plays, 85 yards, 6:24; Tied 7–7

Second quarter

- (12:21) CCU TD – Sam Pinckney 26-yard pass from Grayson McCall, Kade Hensley kick
  Drive: 6 plays, 65 yards, 2:33; Coastal Carolina 14–7
- (03:09) ARMY TD – Jakobi Buchanan 1-yard rush, Quinn Maretzki kick
  Drive: 15 plays, 75 yards, 9:12; Tied 14–14

Third quarter

- (08:30) CCU FG – Kade Hensley 25-yard field goal
  Drive: 13 plays, 68 yards, 6:30; Coastal Carolina 17–14
- (05:23) ARMY TD – Ay'Jaun Marshall 54-yard pass from Tyhier Tyler, Quinn Maretzki kick
  Drive: 6 plays, 75 yards, 3:07; Army 21–17
- (01:27) CCU TD – Reese White 14-yard pass from Grayson McCall, Kade Hensley kick
  Drive: 8 plays, 65 yards, 3:56; Coastal Carolina 24–21

Fourth quarter

- (09:51) CCU TD – Reese White 2-yard rush, Kade Hensley kick
  Drive: 11 plays, 56 yards, 5:09; Coastal Carolina 31–21
- (08:58) ARMY TD – Braheam Murphy 73-yard pass from Cade Ballard, Quinn Maretzki kick
  Drive: 2 plays, 75 yards, 0:53; Coastal Carolina 31–28
- (03:01) CCU TD – Grayson McCall 5-yard rush, Kade Hensley kick
  Drive: 10 plays, 75 yards, 5:57; Coastal Carolina 38–28

Passing

- ARMY – Cade Ballard: 3/5, 88 yards, 1 TD
- CCU – Grayson McCall: 12/17, 174 yards, 3 TD

Rushing

- ARMY – Tyrell Robinson: 9 carries, 135 yards, 1 TD
- CCU – Reese White: 21 carries, 133 yards, 1 TD

Receiving

- ARMY – Braheam Murphy: 1 reception, 73 yards, 1 TD
- CCU – Sam Pinckney: 3 receptions, 69 yards, 1 TD

Defense

- ARMY – Marquel Broughton: 12 total tackles (6 solo, 6 assisted)
- CCU – Josaiah Stewart: 6 total tackles (3 solo, 3 assisted), 1.5 tackles for loss, 1 quarterback hurry

Statistics	ARMY	CCU
First downs	11	30
3rd down efficiency	5–12	4–11
4th down efficiency	2–3	3–3
Plays–yards	47–344	70–437
Rushes–yards	39–202	53–263
Passing yards	142	174
Passing: Comp–Att–Int	4–8–1	12–17–0
Penalties–yards	6–47	4–21
Turnovers	1	0
Time of possession	23:44	36:16

=== UTSA ===
UTSA Roadrunners at Army Black Knights

Quarter	1	2	3	4	OT	Total
Roadrunners	0	14	7	14	6	41
Black Knights	7	14	7	7	3	38

at Michie Stadium, West Point, NY

- Date: September 10, 2022
- Game time: 12:00 p.m. EDT
- Game weather: Temperature: 77 °F (25 °C) • Wind: SW 5 mph • Weather: Sunny
- Game attendance: 23,551
- Referee: Art Brown
- TV announcers (CBSSN): Jason Knapp (play-by-play), Ross Tucker (analyst) & Tina Cervasio (sideline)
- ESPN – Harris rallies UTSA over Army in overtime, 41–38 /// Box Score, UTSA at Army /// Army Pregame Notes /// UTSA Pregame Notes /// Postgame Notes

Game information

First quarter

- (05:24) ARMY TD – Ay'Jaun Marshall 77-yard pass from Tyhier Tyler, Quinn Maretzki kick
  Drive: 1 play, 77 yards, 0:11; Army 7–0

Second quarter

- (07:58) UTSA TD – Trelon Smith 1-yard rush, Jared Sackett kick
  Drive: 1 play, 1 yard, 0:05; Tied 7–7
- (04:45) ARMY TD – Jakobi Buchanan 1-yard rush, Quinn Maretzki kick
  Drive: 7 plays, 75 yards, 3:13; Army 14–7
- (01:29) UTSA TD – Zakhari Franklin 29-yard pass from Frank Harris, Jared Sackett kick
  Drive: 10 plays, 75 yards, 3:16; Tied 14–14
- (00:03) ARMY TD – Jakobi Buchanan 1-yard rush, Quinn Maretzki kick
  Drive: 9 plays, 75 yards, 1:26; Army 21–14

Third quarter

- (06:49) ARMY TD – Tyhier Tyler 16-yard rush, Quinn Maretzki kick
  Drive: 12 plays, 75 yards, 8:11; Army 28–14
- (02:02) UTSA TD – Zakhari Franklin 9-yard pass from Frank Harris, Jared Sackett kick
  Drive: 13 plays, 84 yards, 4:42; Army 28–21

Fourth quarter

- (09:49) UTSA TD – Brenden Brady 1-yard rush, Jared Sackett kick
  Drive: 11 plays, 74 yards, 4:55; Tied 28–28
- (07:11) UTSA TD – Brenden Brady 1-yard rush, Jared Sackett kick
  Drive: 4 plays, 54 yards, 1:12; UTSA 35–28
- (01:03) ARMY TD – Tyrell Robinson 42-yard pass from Cade Ballard, Quinn Maretzki kick
  Drive: 10 plays, 75 yards, 6:08; Tied 35–35

Overtime

- (00:00) ARMY FG – Quinn Maretzki 28-yard field goal
  Drive: 10 plays, 14 yards, 0:00; Army 38–35
- (00:00) UTSA TD – De'Corian Clark 7-yard pass from Frank Harris
  Drive: 2 plays, 25 yards, 0:00; UTSA 41–38

Passing

- UTSA – Frank Harris: 32/45, 359 yards, 3 TD
- ARMY – Cade Ballard: 11/15, 221 yards, 1 TD

Rushing

- UTSA – Brenden Brady: 19 carries, 76 yards, 2 TD
- ARMY – Tyhier Tyler: 9 carries, 61 yards, 1 TD

Receiving

- UTSA – Zakhari Franklin: 10 receptions, 122 yards, 2 TD
- ARMY – Ay'Jaun Marshall: 3 receptions, 87 yards, 1 TD

Defense

- UTSA – Clifford Chattman: 11 total tackles (7 solo, 4 assisted), 1 quarterback hurry
- ARMY – Marquel Broughton: 9 total tackles (6 solo, 3 assisted), 3 pass break-ups

Statistics	UTSA	ARMY
First downs	30	22
3rd down efficiency	11–15	7–16
4th down efficiency	0–1	3–4
Plays–yards	81–512	72–483
Rushes–yards	36–153	54–179
Passing yards	359	304
Passing: Comp–Att–Int	32–45–0	13–18–0
Penalties–yards	10–70	7–68
Turnovers	0	2
Time of possession	27:53	32:07

=== No. 7 (FCS) Villanova ===
Villanova Wildcats at Army Black Knights

Quarter	1	2	3	4	Total
No. 7 (FCS) Wildcats	7	0	3	0	10
Black Knights	14	7	7	21	49

at Michie Stadium, West Point, NY

- Date: September 17, 2022
- Game time: 12:00 p.m. EDT
- Game weather: Temperature: 68 °F (20 °C) • Wind: S 7 mph • Weather: Sunny
- Game attendance: 32,320
- Referee: Darryl Deberry
- TV announcers (CBSSN): Dave Ryan (play-by-play), Ross Tucker (analyst) & Tina Cervasio (sideline)
- ESPN – Villanova Wildcats at Army Black Knights /// Box Score, Villanova at Army /// Army Pregame Notes /// Villanova Pregame Notes /// Postgame Notes

Game information

First quarter

- (10:50) ARMY TD – Tyhier Tyler 7-yard rush, Quinn Maretzki kick
  Drive: 5 plays, 68 yards, 2:15; Army 7–0
- (05:27) VIL TD – Rayjuon Pringle 5-yard pass from Connor Watkins, Matthew Mercurio kick
  Drive: 11 plays, 75 yards, 5:23; Tied 7–7
- (01:20) ARMY TD – Tyhier Tyler 23-yard rush, Quinn Maretzki kick
  Drive: 8 plays, 66 yards, 4:03; Army 14–7

Second quarter

- (05:12) ARMY TD – Cade Ballard 6-yard rush, Quinn Maretzki kick
  Drive: 9 plays, 80 yards, 4:42; Army 21–7

Third quarter

- (13:11) ARMY TD – Tyson Riley 70-yard rush, Quinn Maretzki kick
  Drive: 3 plays, 76 yards, 1:43; Army 28–7
- (08:27) VIL FG – Matthew Mercurio 40-yard field goal
  Drive: 11 plays, 50 yards, 4:38; Army 28–10

Fourth quarter

- (14:56) ARMY TD – Tyhier Tyler 3-yard rush, Quinn Maretzki kick
  Drive: 14 plays, 75 yards, 8:31; Army 35–10
- (12:53) ARMY TD – Tyrell Robinson 73-yard punt return, Quinn Maretzki kick
  Drive: 0 plays, 0 yards, 0:00; Army 42–10
- (04:29) ARMY TD – Hayden Reed 24-yard rush, Trey Gronotte kick
  Drive: 6 plays, 56 yards, 3:14; Army 49–10

Passing

- VIL – Connor Watkins: 12/21, 74 yards, 1 TD, 2 INT
- ARMY – Cade Ballard: 0/1, 0 yards

Rushing

- VIL – Connor Watkins: 10 carries, 60 yards
- ARMY – Tyson Riley: 21 carries, 158 yards, 1 TD

Receiving

- VIL – Rayjuon Pringle: 6 receptions, 54 yards, 1 TD
- ARMY – No Receptions

Defense

- VIL – Timmy Furgeson: 8 total tackles (3 solo, 5 assisted)
- ARMY – Leo Lowin: 7 total tackles (4 solo, 3 assisted)

Statistics	VIL	ARMY
First downs	15	20
3rd down efficiency	1–9	4–10
4th down efficiency	2–3	3–3
Plays–yards	57–247	56–472
Rushes–yards	35–173	55–472
Passing yards	74	0
Passing: Comp–Att–Int	12–22–2	0–1–0
Penalties–yards	7–55	7–80
Turnovers	2	0
Time of possession	29:17	30:43

=== Georgia State ===
Georgia State Panthers at Army Black Knights

Quarter	1	2	3	4	Total
Panthers	3	14	0	14	31
Black Knights	0	0	7	7	14

at Michie Stadium, West Point, NY

- Date: October 1, 2022
- Game time: 12:00 p.m. EDT
- Game weather: Temperature: 57 °F (14 °C) • Wind: E 8 mph • Weather: Cloudy
- Game attendance: 25,752
- Referee: Mike Roche
- TV announcers (CBSSN): Jason Knapp (play-by-play), Ross Tucker (analyst) & Tina Cervasio (sideline)
- ESPN – Georgia State breaks away late, beats Army 31–14 /// Box Score, Georgia State at Army /// Army Pregame Notes /// Georgia State Pregame Notes /// Postgame Notes

Game information

First quarter

- (11:12) GSU FG – Michael Hayes 46-yard field goal
  Drive: 13 plays, 47 yards, 3:48; Georgia State 3–0

Second quarter

- (11:14) GSU TD – Darren Grainger 13-yard rush, Michael Hayes kick
  Drive: 4 plays, 38 yards, 1:19; Georgia State 10–0
- (06:03) GSU TD – Jamyest Williams 33-yard rush, Michael Hayes kick
  Drive: 6 plays, 64 yards, 1:57; Georgia State 17–0

Third quarter

- (10:32) ARMY TD – Tyhier Tyler 1-yard rush, Quinn Maretzki kick
  Drive: 8 plays, 75 yards, 4:28; Georgia State 17–7

Fourth quarter

- (14:57) ARMY TD – Tyhier Tyler 5-yard rush, Quinn Maretzki kick
  Drive: 13 plays, 80 yards, 7:28; Georgia State 17–14
- (02:59) GSU TD – Ja'Cyais Credle 57-yard pass from Darren Grainger, Michael Hayes kick
  Drive: 3 plays, 62 yards, 0:15; Georgia State 24–14
- (01:57) GSU TD – Tucker Gregg 56-yard rush, Michael Hayes kick
  Drive: 2 plays, 60 yards, 0:55; Georgia State 31–14

Passing

- GSU – Darren Grainger: 8/12, 157 yards, 1 TD
- ARMY – Cade Ballard: 1/7, 11 yards, 1 INT

Rushing

- GSU – Tucker Gregg: 16 carries, 124 yards, 1 TD
- ARMY – Tyhier Tyler: 19 carries, 110 yards, 2 TD

Receiving

- GSU – Ja'Cyais Credle: 2 receptions, 75 yards, 1 TD
- ARMY – Tyrell Robinson: 1 reception, 11 yards

Defense

- GSU – Jordan Veneziale: 13 total tackles (7 solo, 6 assisted), 2 fumble recoveries, 2 pass break-ups
- ARMY – Leo Lowin: 12 total tackles (9 solo, 3 assisted), 2 tackles for loss, 1 sack, 1 fumble recovery

Statistics	GSU	ARMY
First downs	20	24
3rd down efficiency	5–10	9–15
4th down efficiency	1–2	0–4
Plays–yards	58–456	77–365
Rushes–yards	46–299	69–354
Passing yards	157	11
Passing: Comp–Att–Int	8–12–0	1–8–1
Penalties–yards	4–34	0–0
Turnovers	1	3
Time of possession	21:05	38:55

=== At No. 15 Wake Forest ===
Army Black Knights at No. 15 Wake Forest Demon Deacons

Quarter	1	2	3	4	Total
Black Knights	0	0	0	10	10
No. 15 Demon Deacons	14	7	17	7	45

at Truist Field at Wake Forest, Winston-Salem, NC

- Date: October 8, 2022
- Game time: 7:30 p.m. EDT
- Game weather: Temperature: 60 °F (16 °C) • Wind: N 5 mph • Weather: Clear
- Game attendance: 32,524
- Referee: Jerry Magallanes
- TV announcers (ACCRSN): Evan Lepler (play-by-play), Brian Jordan (analyst) & Wiley Ballard (sideline)
- ESPN – No. 15 Wake Forest rushes past Army, 45–10 /// Box Score, Army at No. 15 Wake Forest /// Army Pregame Notes /// Wake Forest Pregame Notes /// Postgame Notes

Game information

First quarter

- (08:08) WF TD – Christian Turner 1-yard rush, Matthew Dennis kick
  Drive: 9 plays, 91 yards, 2:40; Wake Forest 7–0
- (02:20) WF TD – Justice Ellison 3-yard rush, Matthew Dennis kick
  Drive: 5 plays, 56 yards, 1:38; Wake Forest 14–0

Second quarter

- (02:37) WF TD – Quinton Cooley 1-yard rush, Matthew Dennis kick
  Drive: 12 plays, 82 yards, 5:04; Wake Forest 21–0

Third quarter

- (13:30) WF TD – Sam Hartman 26-yard pass from A. T. Perry, Matthew Dennis kick
  Drive: 6 plays, 75 yards, 1:30; Wake Forest 28–0
- (05:29) WF TD – Christian Turner 4-yard rush, Matthew Dennis kick
  Drive: 4 plays, 75 yards, 1:19; Wake Forest 35–0
- (02:10) WF FG – Matthew Dennis 38-yard field goal
  Drive: 7 plays, 45 yards, 1:38; Wake Forest 38–0

Fourth quarter

- (13:53) ARMY TD – Isaiah Alston 57-yard pass from Jemel Jones, Quinn Maretzki kick
  Drive: 7 plays, 70 yards, 3:11; Wake Forest 38–7
- (04:21) WF TD – Wesley Grimes 13-yard pass from Mitch Griffis, Zach Murphy kick
  Drive: 8 plays, 41 yards, 4:21; Wake Forest 45–7
- (02:56) ARMY FG – Quinn Maretzki 33-yard field goal
  Drive: 5 plays, 68 yards, 1:20; Wake Forest 45–10

Passing

- ARMY – Jemel Jones: 4/9, 100 yards, 1 TD
- WF – Sam Hartman: 13/19, 246 yards, 1 TD

Rushing

- ARMY – Ay'Juan Marshall: 3 carries, 44 yards
- WF – Justice Ellison: 11 carries, 96 yards, 1 TD

Receiving

- ARMY – Isaiah Alston: 7 receptions, 123 yards, 1 TD
- WF – A. T. Perry: 5 receptions, 118 yards, 1 TD

Defense

- ARMY – Marquel Broughton: 13 total tackles (4 solo, 6 assisted)
- WF – Dylan Hazen: 12 total tackles (3 solo, 9 assisted), 0.5 tackles for loss, 0.5 sacks, 1 interception

Statistics	ARMY	WF
First downs	19	26
3rd down efficiency	8–17	4–9
4th down efficiency	2–4	1–3
Plays–yards	74–407	64–488
Rushes–yards	53–225	42–221
Passing yards	182	267
Passing: Comp–Att–Int	10–21–1	15–22–0
Penalties–yards	6–36	1–5
Turnovers	2	0
Time of possession	35:56	24:04

=== Colgate ===
Colgate Raiders at Army Black Knights

Quarter	1	2	3	4	Total
Raiders	10	7	0	0	17
Black Knights	14	14	14	0	42

at Michie Stadium, West Point, NY

- Date: October 15, 2022
- Game time: 12:00 p.m. EDT
- Game weather: Temperature: 63 °F (17 °C) • Wind: S 7 mph • Weather: Sunny
- Game attendance: 28,896
- Referee: Larry Saunders
- TV announcers (CBSSN): Jason Knapp (play-by-play), Ross Tucker (analyst) & Tina Cervasio (sideline)
- ESPN – Army backups come up big in 42–17 win over Colgate /// Box Score, Colgate at Army /// Army Pregame Notes /// Colgate Pregame Notes /// Postgame Notes

Game information

First quarter

- (11:04) COL FG – Spencer Biscoe 49-yard field goal
  Drive: 8 plays, 43 yards, 3:56; Colgate 3–0
- (10:52) ARMY TD – Jemel Jones 75-yard rush, Quinn Maretzki kick
  Drive: 1 play, 75 yards, 0:12; Army 7–3
- (07:31) COL TD – Michael Brescia 1-yard rush, Spencer Biscoe kick
  Drive: 8 plays, 75 yards, 3:21; Colgate 10–7
- (03:29) ARMY TD – Hayden Reed 2-yard rush, Quinn Maretzki kick
  Drive: 8 plays, 75 yards, 4:02; Army 14–10

Second quarter

- (10:09) ARMY TD – Braheam Murphy 11-yard rush, Quinn Maretzki kick
  Drive: 9 plays, 65 yards, 5:08; Army 21–10
- (05:27) ARMY TD – Ay'Jaun Marshall 11-yard rush, Quinn Maretzki kick
  Drive: 7 plays, 57 yards, 3:03; Army 28–10
- (00:23) COL TD – Treyvhon Saunders 19-yard pass from Michael Brescia, Spencer Biscoe kick
  Drive: 9 plays, 47 yards, 2:31; Army 28–17

Third quarter

- (06:33) ARMY TD – Jemel Jones 1-yard rush, Quinn Maretzki kick
  Drive: 16 plays, 77 yards, 8:22; Army 35–17
- (04:15) ARMY TD – Markel Johnson 24-yard rush, Quinn Maretzki kick
  Drive: 1 play, 24 yards, 0:08; Army 42–17

Fourth quarter

No scoring

Passing

- COL – Michael Brescia: 16/25, 129 yards, 1 TD, 1 INT
- ARMY – Jemel Jones: 0/2, 0 yards

Rushing

- COL – Michael Brescia: 13 carries, 78 yards, 1 TD
- ARMY – Jemel Jones: 12 carries, 113 yards, 2 TD

Receiving

- COL – Garrett Oakey: 3 receptions, 50 yards
- ARMY – No Receptions

Defense

- COL – Tyler Flick: 12 total tackles (4 solo, 8 assisted)
- ARMY – Jimmy Ciarlo: 8 total tackles (4 solo, 4 assisted)

Statistics	COL	ARMY
First downs	17	20
3rd down efficiency	7–14	8–10
4th down efficiency	1–3	0–0
Plays–yards	64–342	58–467
Rushes–yards	32–193	55–467
Passing yards	149	0
Passing: Comp–Att–Int	18–32–1	0–3–0
Penalties–yards	4–30	8–55
Turnovers	2	1
Time of possession	30:22	29:38

=== Louisiana–Monroe ===
Louisiana–Monroe Warhawks at Army Black Knights

Quarter	1	2	3	4	Total
Warhawks	3	14	0	7	24
Black Knights	7	7	17	17	48

at Michie Stadium, West Point, NY

- Date: October 22, 2022
- Game time: 12:00 p.m. EDT
- Game weather: Temperature: 62 °F (17 °C) • Wind: N 5 mph • Weather: Sunny
- Game attendance: 30,132
- Referee: Marcus Woods
- TV announcers (CBSSN): Jason Knapp (play-by-play), Ross Tucker (analyst) & Tina Cervasio (sideline)
- ESPN – Jones scores 3 TDs in Army's 48–24 victory over ULM /// Box Score, Louisiana–Monroe at Army /// Army Pregame Notes /// Louisiana–Monroe Pregame Notes /// Postgame Notes

Game information

First quarter

- (09:19) ULM FG – Calum Sutherland 22-yard field goal
  Drive: 12 plays, 70 yards, 5:41; Louisiana–Monroe 3–0
- (06:02) ARMY TD – Jemel Jones 31-yard rush, Quinn Maretzki kick
  Drive: 6 plays, 75 yards, 3:17; Army 7–3

Second quarter

- (12:49) ULM TD – Boogie Knight 12-yard pass from Chandler Rogers, Calum Sutherland kick
  Drive: 1 play, 12 yards, 0:06; Louisiana–Monroe 10–7
- (05:43) ULM TD – Andrew Henry 10-yard rush, Calum Sutherland kick
  Drive: 6 plays, 98 yards, 2:33; Louisiana–Monroe 17–7
- (00:38) ARMY TD – Jemel Jones 2-yard rush, Quinn Maretzki kick
  Drive: 11 plays, 75 yards, 5:05; Louisiana–Monroe 17–14

Third quarter

- (09:23) ARMY FG – Quinn Maretzki 38-yard field goal
  Drive: 10 plays, 34 yards, 5:24; Tied 17–17
- (03:40) ARMY TD – Jemel Jones 6-yard rush, Quinn Maretzki kick
  Drive: 9 plays, 49 yards, 5:12; Army 24–17
- (00:12) ARMY TD – Tyson Riley 3-yard rush, Quinn Maretzki kick
  Drive: 5 plays, 60 yards, 2:12; Army 31–17

Fourth quarter

- (06:35) ARMY TD – Jakobi Buchanan 3-yard rush, Quinn Maretzki kick
  Drive: 8 plays, 55 yards, 5:07; Army 38–17
- (05:03) ULM TD – Jevin Frett 23-yard pass from Chandler Rogers, Calum Sutherland kick
  Drive: 6 plays, 75 yards, 1:25; Army 38–24
- (03:48) ARMY FG – Quinn Maretzki 37-yard field goal
  Drive: 5 plays, 23 yards, 1:13; Army 41–24
- (01:22) ARMY TD – Bryson Daily 64-yard rush, Trey Gronotte kick
  Drive: 2 plays, 65 yards, 0:54; Army 48–24

Passing

- ULM – Chandler Rogers: 21/28, 164 yards, 2 TD, 1 INT
- ARMY – Jemel Jones: 2/4, 41 yards

Rushing

- ULM – Bugs Mortimer: 2 carries, 75 yards
- ARMY – Jemel Jones: 17 carries, 96 yards, 3 TD

Receiving

- ULM – Jevin Frett: 3 receptions, 45 yards, 1 TD
- ARMY – Ay'Jaun Marshall: 1 reception, 36 yards

Defense

- ULM – Quae Drake: 9 total tackles (6 solo, 3 assisted)
- ARMY – Leo Lowin: 11 total tackles (6 solo, 5 assisted), 1 tackle for loss, 1 sack, 1 interception

Statistics	ULM	ARMY
First downs	20	24
3rd down efficiency	4–11	3–8
4th down efficiency	0–2	1–2
Plays–yards	57–349	66–482
Rushes–yards	29–185	62–441
Passing yards	164	41
Passing: Comp–Att–Int	21–28–1	2–4–0
Penalties–yards	4–26	6–59
Turnovers	1	0
Time of possession	24:39	35:21

=== Vs. Air Force ===
Air Force Falcons vs. Army Black Knights

Quarter	1	2	3	4	Total
Falcons	3	0	7	3	13
Black Knights	0	7	0	0	7

at Globe Life Field, Arlington, TX

- Date: November 5, 2022
- Game time: 10:30 a.m. CDT
- Game weather: Weather: Sunny
- Game attendance: 33,912
- Referee: Timothy Hedgepeth
- TV announcers (CBS): Rich Waltz (play-by-play), Aaron Taylor (analyst) & Sherree Burruss (sideline)
- ESPN – Air Force secures 1st Commander-in-Chief's trophy since 2016 /// Box Score, Air Force vs. Army /// Army Pregame Notes /// Air Force Pregame Notes /// Postgame Notes

Game information

First quarter

- (00:19) AF FG – Matthew Dapore 35-yard field goal
  Drive: 6 plays, 19 yards, 3:06; Air Force 3–0

Second quarter

- (06:24) ARMY TD – Jemel Jones 3-yard rush, Quinn Maretzki kick
  Drive: 6 plays, 68 yards, 3:31; Army 7–3

Third quarter

- (09:32) AF TD – Haaziq Daniels 17-yard rush, Matthew Dapore kick
  Drive: 9 plays, 65 yards, 3:48; Air Force 10–7

Fourth quarter

- (12:06) AF FG – Matthew Dapore 26-yard field goal
  Drive: 16 plays, 58 yards, 8:48; Air Force 13–7

Passing

- AF – Haaziq Daniels: 6/13, 98 yards, 1 INT
- ARMY – Jemel Jones: 4/14, 67 yards, 1 INT

Rushing

- AF – Brad Roberts: 33 carries, 135 yards
- ARMY – Jemel Jones: 21 carries, 37 yards, 1 TD

Receiving

- AF – David Cormier: 4 receptions, 89 yards
- ARMY – Isaiah Alston: 2 receptions, 34 yards

Defense

- AF – Michael Mack II: 6 total tackles (4 solo, 2 assisted), 1 pass break-up
- ARMY – Marquel Broughton: 10 total tackles (8 solo, 2 assisted), 1 tackle for loss, 1 interception

Statistics	AF	ARMY
First downs	18	8
3rd down efficiency	6–14	4–14
4th down efficiency	0–0	1–3
Plays–yards	66–324	49–145
Rushes–yards	53–226	35–78
Passing yards	98	67
Passing: Comp–Att–Int	6–13–1	4–14–1
Penalties–yards	5–40	4–20
Turnovers	1	1
Time of possession	34:49	25:11

=== At Troy Trojans ===
Army Black Knights at Troy Trojans

Quarter	1	2	3	4	Total
Black Knights	0	9	0	0	9
Trojans	0	0	3	7	10

at Veterans Memorial Stadium, Troy, AL

- Date: November 12, 2022
- Game time: 2:30 p.m. CST
- Game weather: Temperature: 65 °F (18 °C) • Wind: S 11 mph • Weather: Cloudy
- Game attendance: 31,010
- Referee: Wayne Winkler
- TV announcers (NFLN): Jason Ross Jr. (play-by-play) & Tyoka Jackson (analyst)
- ESPN – Troy's Martial sets NCAA tackles record in win over Army /// Box Score, Army at Troy /// Army Pregame Notes /// Troy Pregame Notes /// Postgame Notes

Game information

First quarter

No scoring

Second quarter

- (14:57) ARMY TD – Tyhier Tyler 3-yard rush, Quinn Maretzki kick missed
  Drive: 11 plays, 48 yards, 5:14; Army 6–0
- (00:06) ARMY FG – Quinn Maretzki 26-yard field goal
  Drive: 16 plays, 66 yards, 6:34; Army 9–0

Third quarter

- (10:06) TROY FG – Brooks Buce 21-yard field goal
  Drive: 13 plays, 76 yards, 4:54; Army 9–3

Fourth quarter

- (08:04) TROY TD – Tez Johnson 3-yard pass from Gunnar Watson, Brooks Buce kick
  Drive: 8 plays, 57 yards, 3:19; Troy 10–9

Passing

- ARMY – Jemel Jones: 3/7, 42 yards
- TROY – Gunnar Watson: 15/31, 192 yards, 1 TD, 1 INT

Rushing

- ARMY – Tyhier Tyler: 27 carries, 100 yards, 1 TD
- TROY – Kimani Vidal: 13 carries, 72 yards

Receiving

- ARMY – Joshua Lingenfelter: 1 reception, 36 yards
- TROY – Tez Johnson: 6 receptions, 75 yards, 1 TD

Defense

- ARMY – Camden O'Gara: 8 total tackles (2 solo, 6 assisted), 0.5 tackles for loss, 0.5 sacks, 1 pass break-up
- TROY – Carlton Martial: 22 total tackles (6 solo, 16 assisted)

Statistics	ARMY	TROY
First downs	20	15
3rd down efficiency	5–14	1–9
4th down efficiency	1–2	1–1
Plays–yards	71–357	53–264
Rushes–yards	62–279	22–72
Passing yards	78	192
Passing: Comp–Att–Int	4–9–0	15–31–1
Penalties–yards	3–20	3–35
Turnovers	2	2
Time of possession	37:07	22:53

=== UConn ===
UConn Huskies at Army Black Knights

Quarter	1	2	3	4	Total
Huskies	3	7	7	0	17
Black Knights	7	6	14	7	34

at Michie Stadium, West Point, NY

- Date: November 19, 2022
- Game time: 12:00 p.m. EST
- Game weather: Temperature: 39 °F (4 °C) • Weather: Sunny
- Game attendance: 31,229
- Referee: Gary Patterson
- TV announcers (CBSSN): Jason Knapp (play-by-play), Ross Tucker (analyst) & Tina Cervasio (sideline)
- ESPN – Murphy runs for 124 yards, leads Army over UConn 34–17 /// Box Score, UConn at Army /// Army Pregame Notes /// UConn Pregame Notes /// Postgame Notes

Game information

First quarter

- (12:50) ARMY TD – Miles Stewart 0-yard blocked punt return, Quinn Maretzki kick
  Drive: 0 plays, 0 yards, 0:00; Army 7–0
- (06:04) UCONN FG – Noe Ruelas 26-yard field goal
  Drive: 14 plays, 67 yards, 6:39; Army 7–3

Second quarter

- (03:12) UCONN TD – Victor Rosa 43-yard rush, Noe Ruelas kick
  Drive: 7 plays, 80 yards, 3:47; UConn 10–7
- (00:18) ARMY TD – Jemel Jones 1-yard rush, Quinn Maretzki kick blocked
  Drive: 11 plays, 75 yards, 2:54; Army 13–10

Third quarter

- (08:33) UCONN TD – Zion Turner 1-yard rush, Noe Ruelas kick
  Drive: 9 plays, 70 yards, 4:27; UConn 17–13
- (08:20) ARMY TD – Braheam Murphy 75-yard rush, Quinn Maretzki kick
  Drive: 1 play, 75 yards, 0:13; Army 20–17
- (00:19) ARMY TD – Tyhier Tyler 4-yard rush, Quinn Maretzki kick
  Drive: 5 plays, 38 yards, 2:43; Army 27–17

Fourth quarter

- (04:23) ARMY TD – Tyhier Tyler 2-yard rush, Quinn Maretzki kick
  Drive: 8 plays, 27 yards, 2:50; Army 34–17

Passing

- UCONN – Zion Turner: 14/24, 116 yards, 2 INT
- ARMY – Tyhier Tyler: 0/1, 0 yards

Rushing

- UCONN – Victor Rosa: 12 carries, 111 yards, 1 TD
- ARMY – Braheam Murphy: 7 carries, 124 yards, 1 TD

Receiving

- UCONN – Aaron Turner: 5 receptions, 43 yards
- ARMY – No Receptions

Defense

- UCONN – Jackson Mitchell: 16 total tackles (3 solo, 13 assisted)
- ARMY – Marquel Broughton: 13 total tackles (3 solo, 10 assisted), 1 tackle for loss, 1 interception, 1 pass break-up

Statistics	UCONN	ARMY
First downs	18	15
3rd down efficiency	5–11	6–12
4th down efficiency	0–1	1–2
Plays–yards	61–370	59–320
Rushes–yards	37–254	58–320
Passing yards	116	0
Passing: Comp–Att–Int	14–24–2	0–1–0
Penalties–yards	11–78	4–25
Turnovers	2	0
Time of possession	29:40	30:20

=== At UMass ===
Army Black Knights at UMass Minutemen

Quarter	1	2	3	4	Total
Black Knights	7	21	0	16	44
Minutemen	7	0	0	0	7

at Warren McGuirk Alumni Stadium, Hadley, MA

- Date: November 26, 2022
- Game time: 12:00 p.m. EST
- Game weather: Temperature: 49 °F (9 °C) • Wind: NW 9 mph • Weather: Sunny
- Game attendance: 10,119
- Referee: Riley Johnson
- TV announcers (ESPN+): Jay Burnham (play-by-play) & Andy Gresh (analyst)
- ESPN – Tyler's 3 rushing TDs power Army in 44–7 rout of UMass /// Box Score, Army at UMass /// Army Pregame Notes /// UMass Pregame Notes /// Postgame Notes

Game information

First quarter

- (10:48) UMASS TD - Gino Campiotti 2-yard rush, Cameron Carson kick
  Drive: 9 plays, 75 yards, 4:12; UMass 7-0
- (03:54) ARMY TD - Jakobi Buchanan 10-yard rush, Quinn Maretzki kick
  Drive: 5 plays, 35 yards, 2:25; Tied 7-7

Second quarter

- (14:53) ARMY TD - Tyhier Tyler 27-yard rush, Quinn Maretzki kick
  Drive: 4 plays, 77 yards, 1:27;Army 14-7
- (11:05) ARMY TD - Tyhier Tyler 4-yard rush, Quinn Maretzki kick
  Drive: 5 plays, 50 yards, 2:38;Army 21-7
- (01:57) ARMY TD - Tyhier Tyler 1-yard rush, Quinn Maretzki kick
  Drive: 10 plays, 71 yards, 5:40;Army 28-7

Third quarter

No scoring

Fourth quarter

- (08:32) ARMY TD - Jakobi Buchanan 1-yard rush, Quinn Maretzki kick
  Drive: 11 plays, 40 yards, 5:59; Army 35-7
- (04:47) ARMY FG – Quinn Maretzki 20-yard field goal
  Drive: 6 plays, 16 yards, 3:31; Army 38–7
- (01:20) ARMY TD - Bryson Dailly 54-yard rush, Quinn Maretzki kick missed
  Drive: 3 plays, 66 yards, 1:23;Army 44-7

Passing

- ARMY – Tyhier Tyler: 2/2, 67 yards
- UMASS – Brady Olson: 13/24, 145 yards, 2 INT

Rushing

- ARMY – Tyhier Tyler: 11 carries, 101 yards, 3 TD
- UMASS – Ellis Merriweather: 5 carries, 49 yards

Receiving

- ARMY – Joshua Lingenfelter: 1 reception, 44 yards
- UMASS – Cameron Sullivan-Brown: 6 receptions, 48 yards

Defense

- ARMY – Max DiDomenico: 6 total tackles (2 solo, 4 assisted), 1 tackle for loss, 1 forced fumble
- UMASS – Jalen Mackie: 19 total tackles (4 solo, 15 assisted), 1 tackle for loss

Statistics	ARMY	UMASS
First downs	19	12
3rd down efficiency	7-14	3-12
4th down efficiency	1-1	0-1
Plays–yards	61-396	56-235
Rushes–yards	56-329	31-90
Passing yards	67	145
Passing: Comp–Att–Int	2-5-0	13-25-2
Penalties–yards	1-5	4-35
Turnovers	0	4
Time of possession	33:04	26:56

=== Vs. Navy ===
Army Black Knights vs. Navy Midshipmen (123rd Army-Navy Game)

Quarter	1	2	3	4	OT	2OT	Total
Midshipmen	0	3	7	0	7	0	17
Black Knights	0	7	0	3	7	3	20

at Lincoln Financial Field, Philadelphia, PA

- Date: December 10, 2022
- Game time: 3:00 p.m. EST
- Game weather: Temperature: 43 °F (6 °C) • Wind: NE 7 mph • Weather: Sunny
- Game attendance: 69,117
- Referee: Marcus Woods
- TV announcers (CBS): Brad Nessler (play-by-play), Gary Danielson (analyst) & Jenny Dell (sideline)
- ESPN – Army tops Navy 20–17 in first OT game in 123 rivalry games /// Box Score, Army vs. Navy /// Army Pregame Notes /// Navy Pregame Notes /// Postgame Notes

Game information

First Quarter

No scoring

Second Quarter

- (12:36) NAVY FG – Bijan Nichols 44-yard field goal
  Drive: 4 plays, 9 yards, 2:03; Navy 3–0
- (01:06) ARMY TD – Jabril Williams 0-yard blocked punt return, Quinn Maretzki kick
  Drive: 0 plays, 0 yards, 0:00; Army 7–3

Third Quarter

- (04:09) NAVY TD – Anton Hall 77-yard rush, Bijan Nichols kick
  Drive: 1 play, 77 yards, 0:12; Navy 10–7

Fourth Quarter

- (01:53) ARMY FG – Quinn Maretzki 37-yard field goal
  Drive: 7 plays, 34 yards, 3:28; Tied 10–10

1st Overtime

- ARMY TD – Markel Johnson 25-yard rush, Quinn Maretzki kick
  Drive: 1 play, 25 yards, 0:00; Army 17–10
- NAVY TD – Maquel Haywood 25-yard pass from Xavier Arline, Bijan Nichols kick
  Drive: 1 play, 25 yards, 0:00; Tied 17–17

2nd Overtime

- ARMY FG – Quinn Maretzki 39-yard field goal
  Drive: 4 plays, 3 yards, 0:00; Army 20–17

Passing

- NAVY – Xavier Arline: 1/1, 25 yards, 1 TD
- ARMY – Cade Ballard: 2/10, 28 yards

Rushing

- NAVY – Xavier Arline: 28 carries, 102 yards
- ARMY – Tyhier Tyler: 23 carries, 62 yards

Receiving

- NAVY – Maquel Haywood: 1 reception, 25 yards, 1 TD
- ARMY – Braheam Murphy: 2 receptions, 28 yards

Defense

- NAVY – Nicholas Straw: 9 total tackles (2 solo, 7 assisted), 0.5 tackles for loss
- ARMY – Leo Lowin: 16 total tackles (4 solo, 12 assisted)

Statistics	NAVY	ARMY
First downs	11	10
3rd down efficiency	4–17	4–17
4th down efficiency	1–1	1–2
Plays–yards	61–284	60–153
Rushes–yards	57–259	48–125
Passing yards	25	28
Passing: Comp–Att–Int	1–4–0	2–12–0
Penalties–yards	8–65	6–50
Turnovers	1	0
Time of possession	32:27	27:33

This year's Army–Navy Game uniforms for the Army Black Knights are dedicated to the soldiers of the 1st Armored Division during World War II. This year marks the 80th anniversary of Operation Torch, which was the start of the United States' ground operations in Europe and North Africa. The "Iron Soldiers" defeated Axis forces in North African harsh desert conditions.

Approximately 125,000 soldiers landed in Algeria and French Morocco in November 1942 in what was the largest amphibious landing in history of the time.

The helmet decal has the 1st Armored Division's unit patch which includes cavalry (yellow), infantry (blue), and field artillery (red). The black of the helmet read "Old Ironsides" unit's nickname.

The uniform (jersey and pants) feature a "mud splatter" look to highlight the harsh conditions experienced by the unit's tanks. The khaki (green/brown) colors and number font are the same as those used on the M3 tanks during World War II. The green represents the fields of Europe, while the brown is for the deserts of Africa. The "1Δ" on the pants is the insignia of the 1st Armored Division and was how their vehicles would be identified in the field.

== Personnel ==
=== Coaching staff ===
Name	Position	First year at position	First year at Army	Alma mater
Jeff Monken	Head coach	2014	2014	Millikin
Offensive staff
Brent Davis	Offensive coordinator	2014	2014	Georgia
Matt Drinkall	Tight ends	2020	2019	Western Illinois–Quad Cities
Jason Nichols	Slotbacks	2022	2022	East Carolina
Blake Powers	Running backs	2022	2018	Indiana
Aaron Smith	Wide receivers	2022	2022	UConn
Mike Viti	Offensive line	2022	2016	Army
Cody Worley	Quarterbacks	2020	2020	Furman
Defensive staff
Nate Woody	Defensive coordinator	2020	2020	Wofford
Cortney Braswell	Inside linebackers	2021	2021	Dalton State
Sean Cronin	Defensive line	2022	2022	Georgetown College
Daryl Dixon	Cornerbacks	2019	2016	Florida
John Loose	Assistant head coach/outside linebackers	2020	2014^{1}	Ithaca
Scot Sloan	Co-defensive coordinator/safeties	2022	2022	Clemson
Special teams staff
Sean Saturnio	Special teams coordinator	2020	2014	Hawaii
Quality control staff
Sean Camp	Defensive Quality Control	2022	2022	Kansas Wesleyan
John French	Offensive Quality Control	2020	2020	Kentucky
Strength and conditioning staff
Scott Swanson	Director of strength and conditioning	1998	1998^{2}	Wake Forest
Conor Hughes	Head Football Strength and Conditioning	2019	2017	Springfield (Mass.)
Blair Vaughan	Associate Head Football Strength and Conditioning	2022	2020	Western Kentucky
Tim Ismail	Assistant Football Strength and Conditioning	2022	2022	Hardin–Simmons
Anthony McArthur	Assistant Football Strength and Conditioning	2022	2022	West Florida
Jacob Riedel	Assistant Football Strength and Conditioning	2022	2022	Wisconsin–Whitewater
Support staff
Clayton Kendrick-Holmes	Chief of Staff/director of football operations	2018	2018	Navy
Ayden Opfer	Director of football operations	2022	2021	Bowling Green
Tucker Waugh	Executive Director of player personnel	2022	2007^{3}	DePauw
CPT John Voit	Director of player development	2022	2022	Army
Eddie Hernon	Director of player personnel	2022	2022	Rutgers
Rebecca Perez	Director of recruiting	2022	2022	San Jose State
Jimmy Noel	On-Campus Recruiting coordinator	2022	2022	Boston College
Brittany Morasse	Recruiting Operations Assistant	2022	2022	SUNY New Paltz
Aaron Bota	Recruiting creative content coordinator	2022	2022	Georgia Southern
MAJ Zach Peterson	Admissions Support Officer	2022	2022	Army
Chris Jann	Director of Video Operations	2022	2022	Temple
Caedmon Storm	Assistant Director of Video Operations	2022	2022	Clemson

1. John Loose also served as the linebackers coach at Army from 1992 to 1999.
2. Scott Swanson also served as an assistant strength & conditioning coach at Army from 1995 to 1996.
3. Tucker Waugh also served as the wide receivers coach at Army from 2000 to 2004.

=== Roster ===
The Army football roster for the start of the 2022 season (as of September 3, 2022):

2022 Army West Point Black Knights roster
Quarterback: 1 Zach Mundell, Freshman (5'9, 181); 2 Tyhier Tyler, Senior (5'8, 183); 4 Ahlon Mitchell, Sophomore (5'11, 177); 6 Jacob Azizi, Freshman (6'0, 175); 7 Jemel Jones, Senior (5'10, 200); 10 Dewayne Coleman, Freshman (5'10, 193); 13 Bryson Daily, Sophomore (6'0, 218); 14 Bryce Davis, Freshman (5'10, 176); 17 Alex Meredith, Junior (5'11, 200); 18 Cade Ballard, Senior (5'9, 200); Slot Back: 3 Ay'Jaun Marshall, Junior (5'11, 187); 8 Braheam Murphy, Senior (5'10, 182); 9 Maurice Bellan, Senior (5'10, 185); 15 Kalei Akagi, Freshman (5'9, 199); 19 Sabastian Shannon, Freshman (6'0, 188); 20 Jofranstar Graham, Freshman (5'10, 172); 21 Tyrell Robinson, Sophomore (5'9, 180); 22 Miles Stewart, Sophomore (5'10, 201); 23 Greg Daniel, Freshman (5'10, 200); 25 Donovan Baker, Freshman (5'10, 185); 26 Dallis Small, Freshman (5'8, 203); 30 Lucky Brooks, Sophomore (5'10, 215); 37 Zach Ogbogu, Freshman (5'10, 185); 38 Noah Alexander, Freshman (5'10, 175); Fullback: 27 Markel Johnson, Sophomore (5'8, 202); 32 Tyson Riley, Junior (6'2, 255); 33 Jakobi Buchanan, Junior (6'0, 260); 39 Hayden Reed, Freshman (6'0, 226); 40 Jarel Dickson, Sophomore (5'11, 230); 42 AJ Williams, Sophomore (6'0, 233); 43 Hunter Roddy, Freshman (5'10, 233); 44 Dakoda Wagner, Freshman (6'0, 230); 46 Casey Shorter, Freshman (5'11, 225); 48 Bo Kite, Sophomore (6'2, 244); Wide receiver: 5 Cole Caterbone, Senior (6'1, 200); 11 Isaiah Alston, Sophomore (6'4, 195); 16 Taylor Saulsberry, Freshman (6'3, 208); 29 Zion Jackson, Freshman (6'0, 185); 30 Liam Fortner, Freshman (6'1, 212); 31 Michael Davis, Freshman (6'0, 208); 80 Ryan Jackovic, Senior (6'5, 225); 81 Logan Burks, Sophomore (6'6, 209); 82 Veshe Daniyan, Junior (6'1, 195); 84 Cam Schurr, Sophomore (6'1, 193); 87 Casey Reynolds, Sophomore (6'2, 200); 84 Isaiah Lige, Sophomore (6'0, 200); Long snapper: 50 Ryan Aguilar, Senior (6'2, 225); 55 Patrick Szczesniak, Senior (6'2, 225); 62 Jaxon Miller, Freshman (6'0, 245); 64 Jack Pirinelli, Freshman (6'1, 220); 67 Cole McCutcheon, Junior (5'11, 202); Kicker: 2 Anderson Britton, Freshman (5'9, 165); 7 Charlie Barnett, Freshman (6'2, 182); 15 Quinn Maretzki, Junior (5'10, 170); 94 Cole Talley, Junior (6'0, 205); 96 Trey Gronotte, Sophomore (6'0, 180)	Tight end: 45 Cooper Wilkinson, Freshman (6'3, 226); 47 Patrick Hester, Freshman (6'5, 245); 83 Lucas Scott, Sophomore (6'3, 275); 85 David Crossan, Sophomore (6'3, 272); 86 Will Montesi, Sophomore (6'2, 232); 88 Joshua Lingenfelter, Junior (6'3, 240); 89 Blane Cleaver, Sophomore (6'2, 233); Offensive lineman: 50 Braden Bartosh, Freshman (6'2, 279); 51 Davis Wulf, Sophomore (6'1, 270); 53 Bill Katsigiannis, Sophomore (6'1, 280); 54 Tanner Bivins, Freshman (6'1, 265); 55 Chris Hunter, Sophomore (6'1, 265); 56 Jack Flowers, Freshman (6'1, 273); 57 Connor Bishop, Senior (6'3, 275); 59 Will Jeffcoat, Sophomore (6'2, 295); 60 Connor Finucane, Junior (6'4, 295); 62 Sam Barczak, Junior (6'2, 285); 64 Beau Lombardi, Junior (6'2, 270); 65 Luke McCurdy, Freshman (6'3, 247); 66 Aidan Gaines, Junior (6'0, 290); 68 Jackson Filipowicz, Junior (6'3, 275); 69 Matthew Adoghe, Sophomore (6'3, 305); 70 David Hoyt, Sophomore (6'4, 295); 71 Matthew Robbins, Sophomore (6'5, 270); 72 Cody Bradford, Freshman (6'3, 275); 73 Ned Brady, Freshman (6'4, 244); 74 Simon Dellinger, Junior (6'3, 280); 75 David Hayward, Junior (6'3, 267); 76 James Maloney, Freshman (6'6, 228); 77 Jordyn Law, Sophomore (6'4, 275); 78 Shayne Buckingham, Junior (6'4, 280); 79 Kenyatta Brannon, Freshman (6'3, 275); Defensive lineman: 44 Nathaniel Smith, Junior (6'3, 270); 52 Austin Hill, Junior (6'1, 250); 52 Ryan Scott, Freshman (6'2, 268); 58 Jack Latore, Freshman (6'5, 236); 59 Deshontez Gray, Freshman (6'3, 269); 75 Zac Daher, Freshman (6'4, 235); 79 Nikai Butler, Junior (6'2, 270); 81 Caden Harman, Freshman (6'2, 242); 83 Kemari Copeland, Freshman (6'2, 235); 86 TJ McCormack, Freshman (6'1, 265); 89 Joey Knight, Freshman (6'2, 224); 90 Malik James, Sophomore (6'1, 300); 91 Trey Sofia, Sophomore (6'6, 250); 92 Isaiah Filisi, Junior (6'3, 300); 93 Tyler Komorowski, Senior (6'3, 285); 94 Bailey Meek, Freshman (6'4, 285); 94 Jacob Tuioti, Freshman (6'1, 273); 95 Kyle Lewis, Sophomore (6'3, 260); 96 Darius Richardson, Junior (6'2, 290); 97 Kwabena Bonsu, Senior (6'4, 286); 98 Dre Miller, Sophomore (6'3, 270); 99 Chris Frey, Junior (6'5, 278); Punter: 82 Cooper Allan, Freshman (6'2, 200); 83 Matthew Gibbons, Freshman (6'0, 175); 90 Billy Boehlke, Junior (6'0, 205); 99 Matthew Rhodes, Sophomore (6'5, 212)	Linebacker: 25 Josiah Banks, Sophomore (6'1, 205); 31 Leo Lowin, Junior (6'0, 215); 36 Peyton Hampton, Senior (6'1, 225); 39 Hamilton Baker, Junior (6'1, 215); 45 Spencer Jones, Junior (6'1, 225); 46 Kalvyn Crummie, Sophomore (6'1, 242); 51 Andon Thomas, Freshman (6'1, 225); 53 Kalib Fortner, Freshman (6'0, 247); 54 Camden O'Gara, Junior (6'0, 227); 56 Brett Gerena, Sophomore (6'0, 225); Outside linebacker: 7 Jimmy Ciarlo, Junior (6'2, 215); 18 Cole Mabry, Senior (6'2, 205); 34 Andre Carter II, Senior (6'7, 260); 38 Fabrice Voyne, Senior (6'2, 220); 42 Clev Lubin, Freshman (6'3, 215); 43 Eric Ford, Freshman (6'3, 220); 48 Tyler Deleon, Freshman (6'3, 249); 49 Jackson Powell, Junior (6'0, 225); 58 Tyler Rafferty, Sophomore (6'3, 235); Defensive back: 1 Daelan Smith, Junior (5'10, 188); 2 Bo Nicholas-Paul, Junior (5'11, 180); 3 Jabril Williams, Freshman (5'10, 179); 4 Jabari Moore, Junior (5'11, 195); 6 D'Andre Tobias, Senior (5'11, 197); 8 Keanu Rebuldela-Kama, Freshman (6'2, 191); 9 Justin Weaver, Freshman (5'11, 176); 10 Cameron Jones, Junior (5'9, 180); 10 Nick Smith, Freshman (6'1, 195); 11 Tommy Zitiello, Sophomore (6'2, 200); 13 Donavon Platt, Freshman (6'0, 204); 14 Jordan Burrell, Sophomore (6'0, 198); 15 Jaydan Mayes, Freshman (5'10, 179); 16 Damon Washington, Sophomore (5'11, 191); 17 Isaiah Morris, Senior (5'11, 180); 18 Zion Sims, Freshman (5'11, 171); 19 Aaron Bibbins, Junior (6'1, 195); 20 (C) Marquel Broughton, Senior (5'10, 196); 21 Tim Thurman Jr., Freshman (5'10, 175); 22 Casey Larkin, Freshman (6'0, 186); 23 Chance Keith, Sophomore (5'11, 197); 26 Quindrelin Hammonds, Junior (6'0, 190); 27 Spencer Williams, Sophomore (6'0, 192); 28 Gavin Shields, Freshman (6'2, 205); 29 Adam Cash, Sophomore (5'11, 217); 30 Collin Matteson, Freshman (6'0, 175); 33 Walker Lyles, Freshman (6'0, 200); 37 Max DiDomenico, Sophomore (6'0, 215); 39 John Javis IV, Freshman (5'9, 175); 47 Noah Short, Freshman (5'11, 175)
