= Darrell Luter Jr. =

American football player (born 2000)

No. 25 – Las Vegas Raiders
- Position: Cornerback
- Roster status: Active

Personal information
- Born: April 24, 2000 (age 26); Hattiesburg, Mississippi, U.S.
- Listed height: 6 ft 0 in (1.83 m)
- Listed weight: 190 lb (86 kg)

Career information
- High school: Oak Grove (Hattiesburg)
- College: Pearl River CC (2018–2019); South Alabama (2020–2022)
- NFL draft: 2023: 5th round, 155th overall pick

Career history
- San Francisco 49ers (2023–2025); Las Vegas Raiders (2026–present)

Awards and highlights
- First-team All-Sun Belt (2021); Third-team All-Sun Belt (2022)

Career NFL statistics as of 2025
- Total tackles: 38
- Forced fumbles: 1
- Fumble recoveries: 1
- Pass deflections: 1
- Stats at Pro Football Reference

Darrell Akeem Luter Jr. (born April 24, 2000) is an American professional football cornerback for the Las Vegas Raiders of the National Football League (NFL). He played college football for the Pearl River Wildcats and South Alabama Jaguars. Luter was drafted by the 49ers in the fifth round of the 2023 NFL draft.

== Early life ==
Luter was born on April 24, 2000, in Hattiesburg, Mississippi. He attended Oak Grove High School and played football for three years, basketball for two years and track for one year. Despite many of his teammates being highly recruited (including six who signed with Football Bowl Subdivision (FBS) teams), Luter was not, and eventually committed to Pearl River Community College.

== College career ==
Luter played at Pearl River from 2018 to 2019, being named second-team all-conference as a sophomore. 247Sports ranked him a three-star junior college recruit and among the top 40 cornerbacks nationally, and after graduating from the school he signed with South Alabama. He appeared in all 11 games in his first year with the team, and although he was for most of the season third-string on the depth chart, Luter was able to tie for the team lead in tackles among players at cornerback.

Luter had a breakout year in 2021, placing third in the FBS in pass breakups while posting four interceptions and only allowing receptions on 26.7% of the passes thrown at him. Pro Football Focus (PFF) named him a second-team All-America selection after the season. As a senior in 2022, he recorded seven pass breakups and only one interception, partly attributed to being targeted less by quarterbacks. Luter was invited to the 2023 Senior Bowl and finished his stint at South Alabama having only allowed catches on 45.3% of passes thrown at him, while recording 17 pass breakups and drawing only six penalties.

== Professional career ==
Pre-draft measurables
Height	Weight	Arm length	Hand span	Wingspan	40-yard dash	10-yard split	20-yard split	20-yard shuttle	Three-cone drill	Vertical jump	Broad jump
5 ft 11 3/4 in (1.82 m)	189 lb (86 kg)	32 3/8 in (0.82 m)	10 3/8 in (0.26 m)	6 ft 5 7/8 in (1.98 m)	4.46 s	1.57 s	2.58 s	4.38 s	6.90 s	40.5 in (1.03 m)	10 ft 3 in (3.12 m)
All values from NFL Combine/Pro Day

=== San Francisco 49ers ===
Luter was selected by the San Francisco 49ers in the fifth round (155th overall) of the 2023 NFL draft. He was placed on the reserve/physically unable to perform (PUP) list to start the 2023 season. On November 18, Luter was activated from the reserve/PUP.

During the third quarter of Super Bowl LVIII against the Kansas City Chiefs, Luter was charged with a fumble after he failed to get out of the way of a Tommy Townsend punt that struck his heel. On the very next play, the Chiefs scored and took the lead.

On November 16, 2024, Luter was placed on injured reserve due to a pelvic injury.

On August 30, 2026, Luter was waived by the 49ers as a part of final roster cuts.

=== Las Vegas Raiders ===
On August 31, 2026, Luter was claimed off waivers by the Las Vegas Raiders.

== NFL career statistics ==
Legend
**Bold**	Career high

=== Regular season ===
Year	Team	Games		Tackles					Interceptions						Fumbles				
Year	Team	GP	GS	Cmb	Solo	Ast	Sck	TFL	Int	Yds	Avg	Lng	TD	PD	FF	Fum	FR	Yds	TD
2023	SF	7	0	7	4	3	0.0	0	0	0	0.0	0	0	0	0	0	0	0	0
2024	SF	3	0	3	1	2	0.0	0	0	0	0.0	0	0	0	**1**	0	0	0	0
2025	SF	**17**	**3**	**28**	**17**	**11**	0.0	**1**	0	0	0.0	0	0	**1**	0	0	**1**	0	0
Career		27	3	38	22	16	0.0	1	0	0	0.0	0	0	1	1	0	1	0	0

=== Postseason ===
Year	Team	Games		Tackles					Interceptions						Fumbles				
Year	Team	GP	GS	Cmb	Solo	Ast	Sck	TFL	Int	Yds	Avg	Lng	TD	PD	FF	Fum	FR	Yds	TD
2023	SF	**3**	0	**2**	**2**	0	0.0	0	0	0	0.0	0	0	0	0	**1**	0	0	0
2025	SF	2	0	0	0	0	0.0	0	0	0	0.0	0	0	0	0	0	0	0	0
Career		5	0	2	2	0	0.0	0	0	0	0.0	0	0	0	0	1	0	0	0
