= Javon Solomon =

American football player (born 2001)

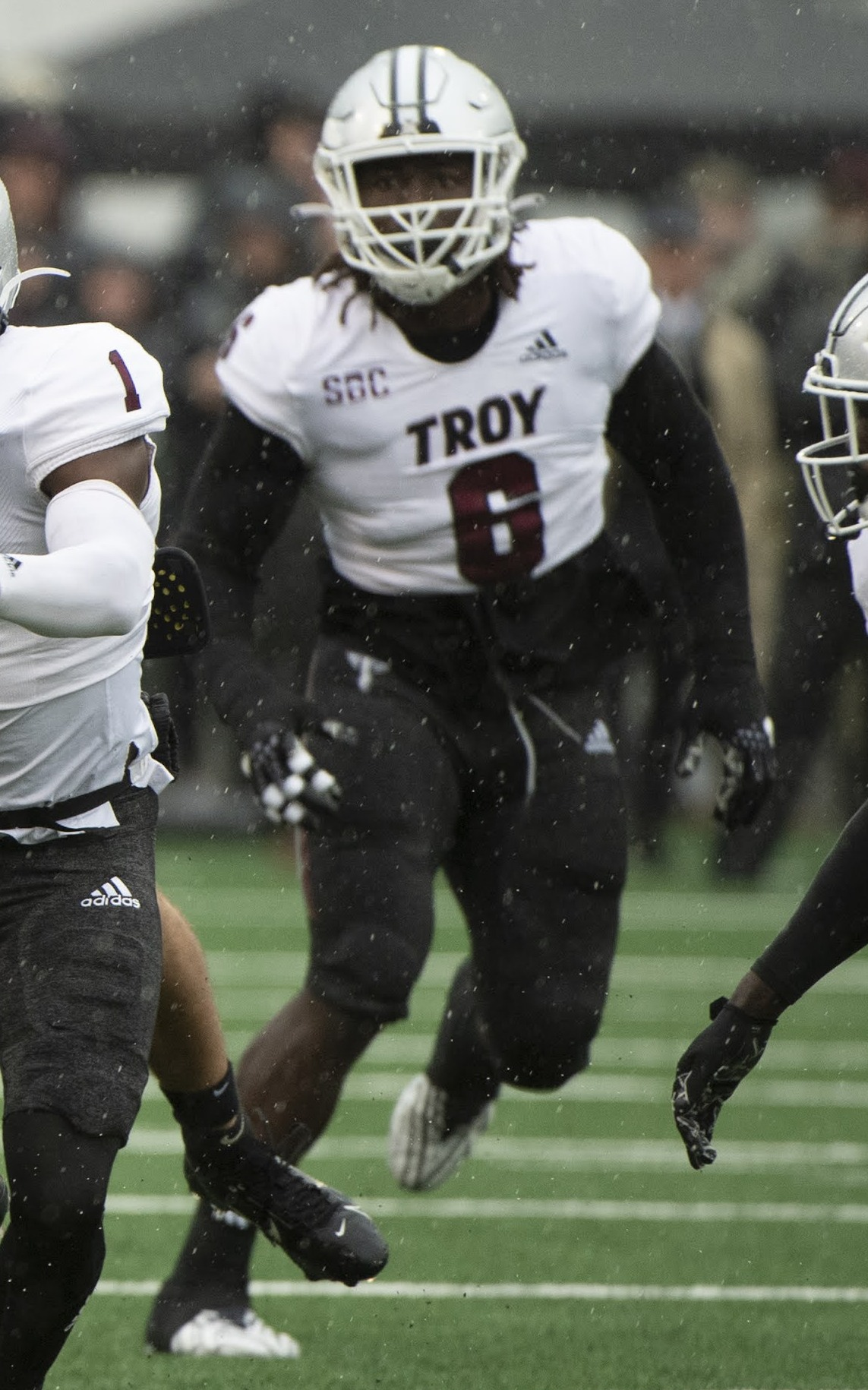
- Solomon with the Troy Trojans in 2023

No. 56 – Buffalo Bills
- Position: Outside linebacker
- Roster status: Active

Personal information
- Born: January 17, 2001 (age 25); Tallahassee, Florida, U.S.
- Listed height: 6 ft 1 in (1.85 m)
- Listed weight: 246 lb (112 kg)

Career information
- High school: Amos P. Godby (Tallahassee)
- College: Troy (2019–2023)
- NFL draft: 2024: 5th round, 168th overall pick

Career history
- Buffalo Bills (2024–present)

Awards and highlights
- 2× First-team All-Sun Belt (2021, 2023); Third-team All-Sun Belt (2022)

Career NFL statistics as of Week 11, 2026
- Total tackles: 44
- Sacks: 4
- Forced fumbles: 2
- Fumble recoveries: 1
- Stats at Pro Football Reference

Javon Pyree Solomon (born January 17, 2001) is an American professional football outside linebacker for the Buffalo Bills of the National Football League (NFL). He played college football for the Troy Trojans and was selected by the Bills in the fifth round of the 2024 NFL draft.

== Early life ==
Solomon attended Amos P. Godby High School in Tallahassee, Florida. As a senior, he had 73 tackles and 10 sacks. He committed to Troy University to play college football.

== College career ==
After playing in three games and redshirting his first year at Troy in 2019, Solomon had 29 tackles and 1.5 sacks in 2020. He had 50 tackles, 11 sacks and one interception in 2021 and 44 tackles and 4.5 sacks in 2022. Solomon switched from outside linebacker to defensive end in 2023 and was named an All-American. He was selected to play in the 2024 Senior Bowl.

== Professional career ==
Pre-draft measurables
Height	Weight	Arm length	Hand span	Wingspan	40-yard dash	10-yard split	20-yard split	20-yard shuttle	Three-cone drill	Vertical jump	Broad jump	Bench press
6 ft 0 7/8 in (1.85 m)	246 lb (112 kg)	33 7/8 in (0.86 m)	10 3/4 in (0.27 m)	6 ft 8 1/4 in (2.04 m)	4.72 s	1.66 s	2.77 s	4.39 s	7.27 s	37.0 in (0.94 m)	9 ft 11 in (3.02 m)	27 reps
All values from NFL Combine/Pro Day

Solomon was selected by the Buffalo Bills with the 168th overall pick in the fifth round of the 2024 NFL draft.
