= Jerrod Clark =

American football player (born 1999)

No. 99 – Dallas Renegades
- Position: Nose tackle
- Roster status: Active

Personal information
- Born: November 16, 1999 (age 26); Dorchester, Massachusetts, U.S.
- Listed height: 6 ft 4 in (1.93 m)
- Listed weight: 337 lb (153 kg)

Career information
- High school: Brighton (Brighton, Massachusetts)
- College: Coastal Carolina (2018–2022)
- NFL draft: 2023: undrafted

Career history
- Los Angeles Chargers (2023–2024)*; Carolina Panthers (2025)*; Arlington Renegades (2025); Houston Gamblers (2026); Dallas Renegades (2027–present)
- * Offseason or practice squad member only

Awards and highlights
- Third-team All-Sun Belt (2022)
- Stats at Pro Football Reference

Jerrod Clark (born November 16, 1999) is an American professional football nose tackle for the Dallas Renegades of the United Football League (UFL). He played college football for the Coastal Carolina Chanticleers.

== Early life ==
Clark grew up in Dorchester, Massachusetts and attended Brighton High School. He led the Bengals football team to the Division 7 state semi-finals as a junior, where they lost to powerhouse Mashpee. He won the Massachusetts Division II State Basketball Championship in 2017 with the Brighton High Bengals. He committed to play football at Coastal Carolina.

== College career ==
In his collegiate career he totaled 105 tackles, 18 being for a loss, 7.5 sacks, and 3 pass deflections. His best collegiate year occurred during the 2022 season where he put up 41 tackles, 10 going for a loss, and 3.5 sacks. For his performance on the year he was named to the Third Team All-Sun Belt.

Clark was projected to be a 5th to 6th round selection in the 2023 NFL draft.

== Professional career ==
Pre-draft measurables
Height	Weight	Arm length	Hand span	Wingspan	40-yard dash	10-yard split	20-yard split	20-yard shuttle	Three-cone drill	Vertical jump	Broad jump
6 ft 3 5/8 in (1.92 m)	334 lb (151 kg)	33 3/4 in (0.86 m)	9 3/4 in (0.25 m)	6 ft 10 in (2.08 m)	5.25 s	1.82 s	3.02 s	4.83 s	7.60 s	27.5 in (0.70 m)	8 ft 6 in (2.59 m)
All values from the NFL Combine

=== Los Angeles Chargers ===
After going unselected in the 2023 NFL draft, Clark signed with the Los Angeles Chargers as an undrafted free agent. He was waived on August 29, 2023 and re-signed to the practice squad. He signed a reserve/future contract on January 11, 2024.

On August 27, 2024, Clark was waived by the Chargers as part of final roster cuts.

=== Arlington Renegades (first stint) ===
On December 9, 2024, Clark signed with the Arlington Renegades of the United Football League (UFL).

=== Carolina Panthers ===
On January 24, 2025, the Carolina Panthers signed Clark to a reserve/future contract. On May 8, 2025, Clark was waived by the Panthers.

=== Arlington Renegades (second stint) ===
On May 21, 2025, Clark re-signed with the Arlington Renegades of the United Football League (UFL).

=== Houston Gamblers ===
On January 13, 2026, McCrary was selected by the Houston Gamblers in the 2026 UFL Draft.
