= Jake Andrews (American football) =

American football player (born 1999)

No. 60 – Houston Texans
- Position: Center
- Roster status: Active

Personal information
- Born: November 11, 1999 (age 27); Montgomery, Alabama, U.S.
- Listed height: 6 ft 3 in (1.91 m)
- Listed weight: 308 lb (140 kg)

Career information
- High school: Stanhope Elmore (Millbrook, Alabama)
- College: Troy (2018–2022)
- NFL draft: 2023: 4th round, 107th overall pick

Career history
- New England Patriots (2023–2024); Houston Texans (2025–present)

Awards and highlights
- First-team All-Sun Belt (2022)

Career NFL statistics as of Week 17, 2025
- Games played: 31
- Games started: 16
- Stats at Pro Football Reference

Wesley Jacob Andrews (born November 11, 1999) is an American professional football center for the Houston Texans. He played college football for the Troy Trojans, and was selected by the New England Patriots of the National Football League (NFL) in the fourth round of the 2023 NFL draft.

== College career ==
Andrews was ranked as a three–star recruit by 247Sports.com coming out of high school. He committed to Troy on June 19, 2017.

== Professional career ==
Pre-draft measurables
Height	Weight	Arm length	Hand span	Wingspan	40-yard dash	10-yard split	20-yard split	20-yard shuttle	Three-cone drill	Vertical jump	Broad jump	Bench press
6 ft 2 3/4 in (1.90 m)	305 lb (138 kg)	31 7/8 in (0.81 m)	10 in (0.25 m)	6 ft 6 in (1.98 m)	5.15 s	1.80 s	2.95 s	4.73 s	7.77 s	26.0 in (0.66 m)	8 ft 6 in (2.59 m)	29 reps
All values from NFL Combine/Pro Day

=== New England Patriots ===
Andrews was selected by the New England Patriots in the fourth round, 108th overall, of the 2023 NFL draft, using a selection they acquired from the Los Angeles Rams in a trade for Sony Michel.

Andrews was placed on injured reserve on August 5, 2024, after suffering a torn meniscus in training camp.

On April 28, 2025, Andrews was released by the Patriots.

=== Houston Texans ===
On April 29, 2025, Andrews was claimed off waivers by the Houston Texans.
