= Carlton Martial =

American football player (born 1999)

No. 38, 2
- Position: Linebacker

Personal information
- Born: April 11, 1999 (age 27); Mobile, Alabama, U.S.
- Listed height: 5 ft 9 in (1.75 m)
- Listed weight: 210 lb (95 kg)

Career information
- High school: McGill–Toolen Catholic (Mobile, Alabama)
- College: Troy (2017–2022)

Career history
- Hamilton Tiger-Cats (2023)*
- * Offseason or practice squad member only

Awards and highlights
- Sun Belt Male Athlete of the Year (2022); Sun Belt Defensive Player of the Year (2022); 4× First-team All-Sun Belt (2019–2022); Freshman All-American (2018); FBS record: Most career total tackles: 578

Carlton Anthony Martial (born April 11, 1999) is an American former college football linebacker. He played for the Troy Trojans, where he became the NCAA's all time leader in total tackles. He was able to play five seasons of college football due to the COVID-19 pandemic. Martial began his career as a walk-on and was selected as a freshman All-American in 2018. He was also a finalist for the Burlsworth Trophy in 2021 and 2022.

== Early life ==
Martial was born in 1999, the son of football coach Philbert Martial. He began playing football at age three with his father's team, the Cottage Hill Steelers. He played at the quarterback, cornerback, and running back positions as a youth player and also played basketball. He attended McGill–Toolen Catholic High School in Mobile, Alabama. He played football at the linebacker position in high school, helping the team to back-to-back state title games, tallying 197 tackles as a junior and 120 tackles as a senior. At five feet, nine inches, he was regarded as small and did not receive any NCAA Division I Football Bowl Subdivision (FBS) scholarship offers. He had offers from Alabama A&M, North Alabama, Jackson State, and Alcorn State, and preferred walk-on offers from Troy and Auburn.

== College career ==
=== Walk-on ===
Martial enrolled at Troy University in 2017 as a preferred walk-on player. He redshirted in 2017 and played at the middle linebacker position as a redshirt freshman in 2018.

=== 2018 season: Freshman All-America honors ===
In August 2018, The Montgomery Advertiser credited Martial for "working his butt off," resulting in a "meteoric rise ... from walk-on chum in practice and in-game towel-waving sideline crazy man to playing a key role." He tallied 76 tackles and helped the 2018 Troy Trojans to a 10–3 record and a victory in the Dollar General Bowl. He was also selected as a freshman All-American by USA Today and the Football Writers Association of America (FWAA).

=== 2019 season ===
As a redshirt sophomore in 2019, Martial led the team with 126 tackles. He was the first Troy player to tally over 100 tackles in eight years. Against Texas State on November 16, he had two one-handed interceptions, one of which he returned 64 yards for a touchdown with eight seconds remaining in the game.

=== 2020 season ===
In August 2020, all college football players were given one extra year of eligbiity due to the COVID-19 pandemic. As a redshirt junior in the COVID-shortened 2020 season, Martial was selected as a first-team pre-season All-American by the Walter Camp Football Foundation. He led the country with 113 tackles. He was the first Troy player since 2002 to register over 100 tackles in consecutive seasons. He also tallied a career-high 21 tackles, a sack and an interception against No. 11 Coastal Carolina.

=== 2021 season ===
In 2021, Martial retained his junior status, as the 2020 season did not alter it. He was selected in August 2021 as the Sun Belt Conference preseason Defensive Player of the Year. In November 2021, he was also selected as a finalist for the Burlsworth Trophy awarded each year to the most outstanding player who began his career as a walk-on.

=== 2022 season: Extra year due to COVID ===
In January 2022, having another year of eligibility remaining due to the COVID year, Martial announced that he would return to try for a fifth season. He began the 2022 season needing 104 tackles to break the NCAA Division I FBS record for most tackles in a career. On November 12, 2022, he had his 546th tackle to break the prior record of 545 tackles set by Tim McGarigle of Northwestern.

=== College statistics ===
Season	Games	Solo tackles	Assists	Total tackles	Tackles for loss
2018	12	33	43	76	9.0
2019	12	70	57	127	18.5
2020	11	54	60	114	10.0
2021	12	44	82	126	10.0
2022	12	55	80	135	3.5
Total	59	256	322	578	51.0

== Professional career ==
On May 14, 2023, Martial signed with the Hamilton Tiger-Cats of the Canadian Football League (CFL). On June 3, 2023, Martial was released by the Tiger-Cats during final roster cuts.

== See also ==
- List of NCAA major college football yearly tackles leaders
