= Josaiah Stewart =

American football player (born 2003)

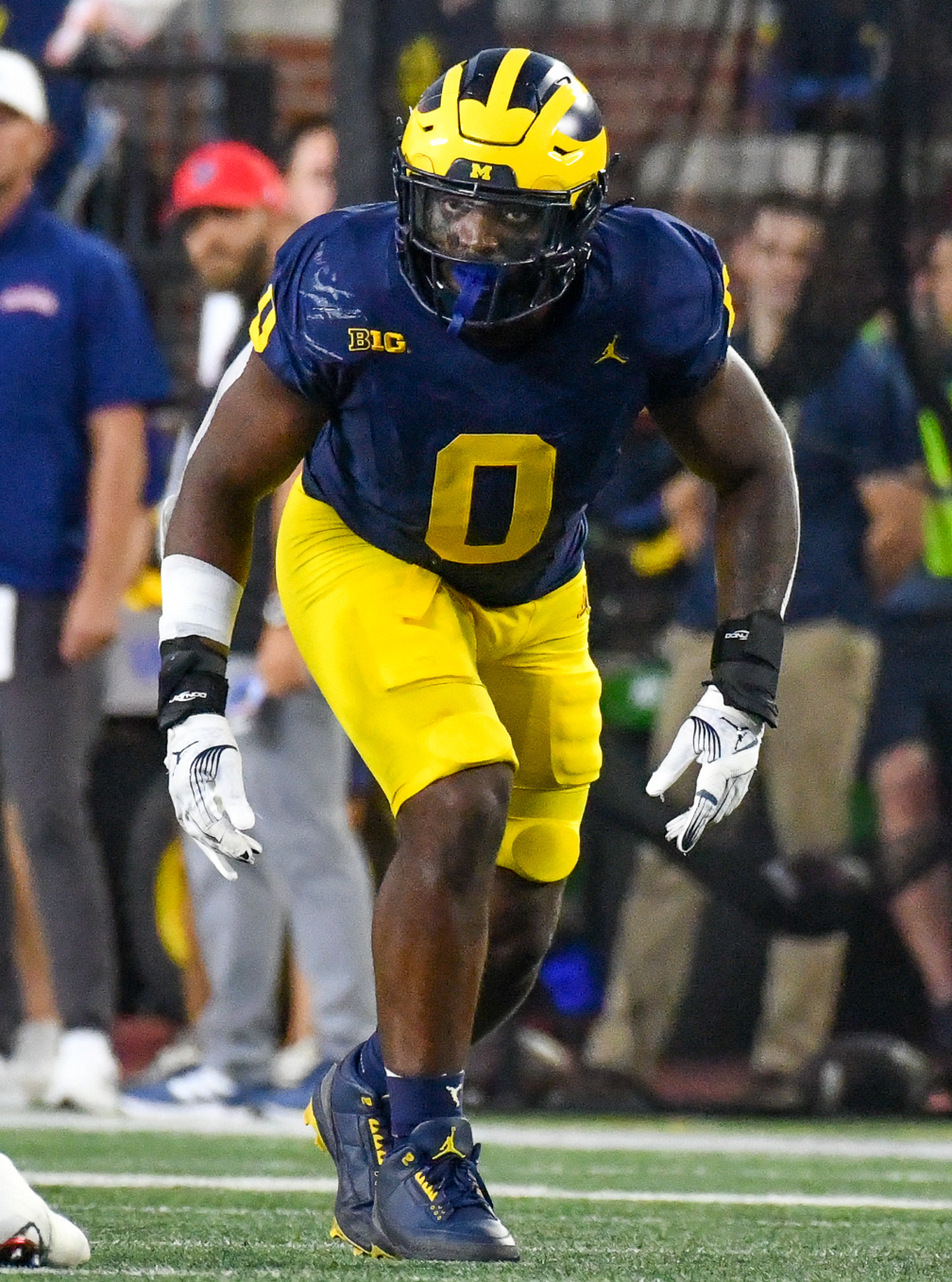
- Stewart with the Michigan Wolverines in 2024

No. 10 – Los Angeles Rams
- Position: Outside linebacker
- Roster status: Active

Personal information
- Born: April 26, 2003 (age 23); The Bronx, New York, U.S.
- Listed height: 6 ft 1 in (1.85 m)
- Listed weight: 251 lb (114 kg)

Career information
- High school: Everett (Everett, Massachusetts)
- College: Coastal Carolina (2021–2022); Michigan (2023–2024)
- NFL draft: 2025: 3rd round, 90th overall pick

Career history
- Los Angeles Rams (2025–present)

Awards and highlights
- CFP national champion (2023); First-team All-Sun Belt (2021); Second-team All-Sun Belt (2022); Second-team All-Big Ten (2024); Freshman All-American (2021)

Career NFL statistics as of 2025
- Tackles: 22
- Sacks: 3
- Forced fumbles: 1
- Pass deflections: 2
- Stats at Pro Football Reference

Josaiah Stewart (born April 26, 2003) is an American professional football outside linebacker for the Los Angeles Rams of the National Football League (NFL). He played college football for the Coastal Carolina Chanticleers and Michigan Wolverines. Stewart was an all-conference selection in the Sun Belt and Big Ten, winning a national championship with Michigan in 2023. He was selected by the Rams in the third round of the 2025 NFL draft.

== Early life ==
Stewart was born on April 26, 2003, the son of Carmen Diaz and Andre Stewart, in the Bronx, New York. He attended Everett High School in Everett, Massachusetts, where he played football and was teammates with Mike Sainristil, Isaiah Likely and Lewis Cine.

As a junior, Stewart recorded 30 tackles, 14 tackles for a loss, 7 sacks and a fumble recovery, while his senior season was cancelled due to the COVID-19 pandemic. Stewart was rated as a three-star recruit and committed to play college football at Coastal Carolina University.

== College career ==
=== Coastal Carolina ===
==== 2021 ====
In 2021, Stewart set the single-game program sack record, with four sacks versus Georgia Southern. He finished his freshman season with 43 tackles, 16 tackles for a loss, 13 sacks and three forced fumbles. His 13 sacks set a single-season school record, breaking the previous record of 10.5 sacks held by Tarron Jackson. For his performance on the year, Stewart was named first-team All-Sun Belt Conference, and a first-team freshman All-American.

==== 2022 ====
In 2022, Stewart recorded 36 tackles, 10 tackles for a loss, three sacks and a forced fumble, earning second-team all-Sun Belt honors. After the season, Stewart entered the NCAA transfer portal. Stewart finished his two-year career at Coastal Carolina with 79 tackles, 25.5 tackles for a loss, 16 sacks and four forced fumbles.

=== Michigan ===
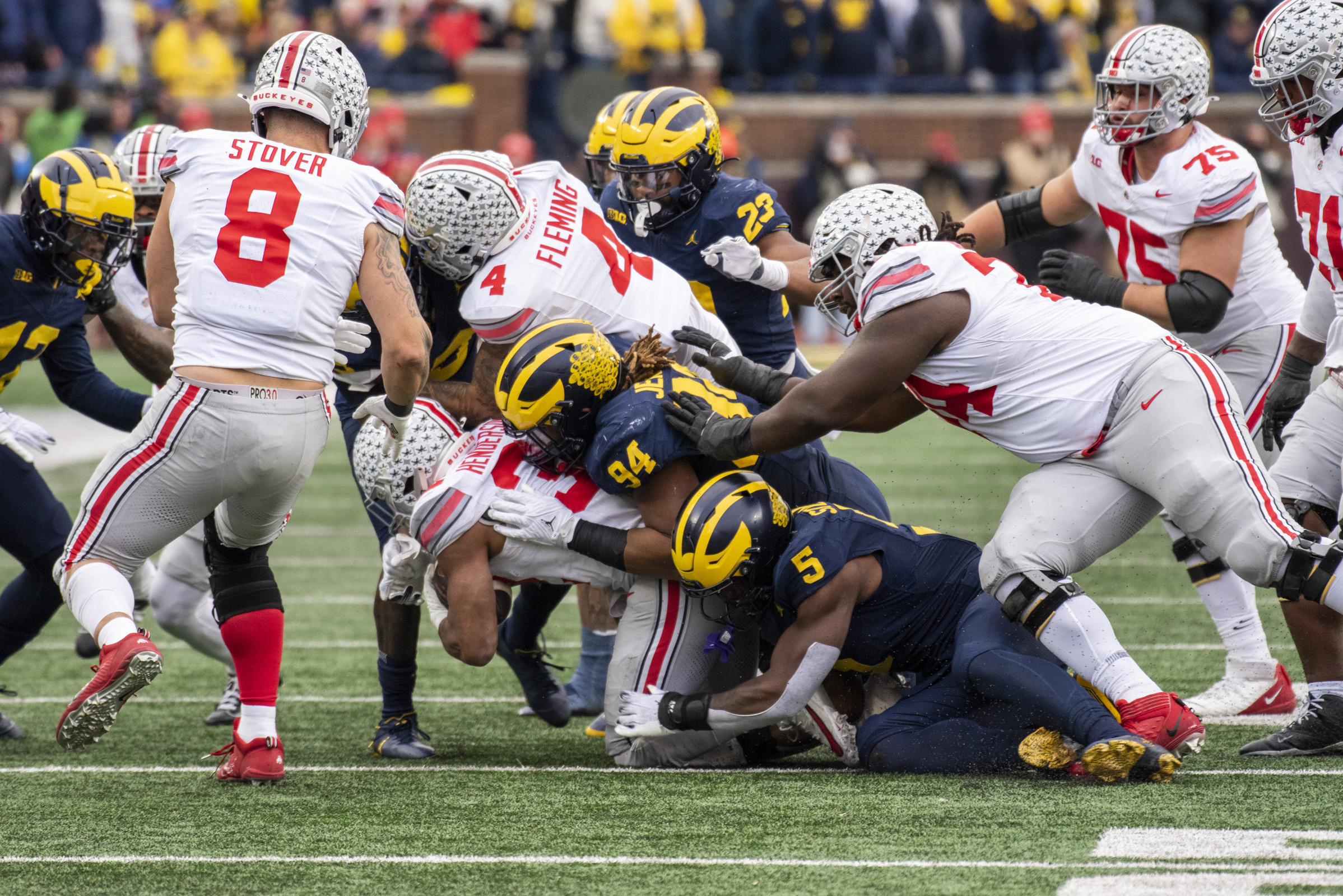
Stewart (No. 5) tackling Ohio State’s TreVeyon Henderson in a 30-24 victory in 2023

==== 2023 ====
On December 18, 2022, Stewart transferred to the University of Michigan to continue his college career. On September 30, 2023, he recorded five tackles and two sacks in a win over Nebraska, earning Big Ten Conference Co-Defensive Player of the Week honors.

In 2023, Stewart appeared in all 15 games for the Wolverines, totaling 38 tackles, 8.5 tackles for a loss, 5.5 sacks and two pass breakups. He was second on Michigan’s national championship team in sacks, leading to an All-Big Ten honorable mention selection.

==== 2024 ====
Entering his senior season, Pro Football Focus listed Stewart as the No. 9 ranked edge rusher in college football prior to the 2024 season. He changed his jersey from No. 5 to No. 0 for his last year at Michigan. Despite transferring one year earlier, Stewart was voted as an alternate team captain for the 2024 season.

In his first game of the 2024 season versus Fresno State, Stewart had team highs with five tackles, three tackles for a loss and two sacks. In week 4 against the USC Trojans, he recorded four tackles, three for a loss, including two sacks and a forced fumble. Following week 4, Stewart was named the Big Ten Defensive Player of the Week, as well as the Reese’s Senior Bowl National Defensive Player of the Week. In week six versus Washington, he had four tackles, two for a loss, including a sack. Before week 8, Sherrone Moore elevated Stewart from an alternate captain, to a full-fledged captain. In week 9 versus Michigan State, Stewart had three tackles, including a sack and a forced fumble as Michigan defeated the Spartans 24-17. It was his fourth consecutive game played in that he recorded a sack. In week 13 versus Northwestern, Stewart had two sacks; his third game with multiple sacks in 2024.

Following the season, Stewart was named a second-team All-Big Ten selection. He started 11 games as a senior, finishing with 33 tackles and led the team in each of the following: 13 tackles for a loss, 8.5 sacks and two forced fumbles. In December 2024, Stewart formally declared for the 2025 NFL draft and opted out of his final bowl game. He finished his four-year college career with a combined 150 tackles, 48 tackles for a loss, 30 sacks and six forced fumbles.

== Professional career ==
Pre-draft measurables
Height	Weight	Arm length	Hand span	Wingspan
6 ft 1 in (1.85 m)	249 lb (113 kg)	31 7/8 in (0.81 m)	9 1/2 in (0.24 m)	6 ft 7 in (2.01 m)
All values from NFL Combine

Stewart was selected by the Los Angeles Rams with the 90th overall pick in the third round of the 2025 NFL draft. Playing behind standout teammates Jared Verse and Byron Young, Stewart finished his rookie season with 3 sacks, 6 quarterback hits, and 22 total tackles. His 12.6% pressure rate was notable as it ranked 4th among all rookie defensive players.

== NFL career statistics ==
=== Regular season ===
Year	Team	Games		Tackles					Interceptions						Fumbles				
Year	Team	GP	GS	Cmb	Solo	Ast	Sck	TFL	Int	Yds	Avg	Lng	TD	PD	FF	Fum	FR	Yds	TD
2025	LAR	17	0	22	13	9	3.0	3	0	0	0.0	0	0	2	1	0	0	0	0
Career		17	0	22	13	9	3.0	3	0	0	0.0	0	0	2	1	0	0	0	0

=== Postseason ===
Year	Team	Games		Tackles					Interceptions						Fumbles				
Year	Team	GP	GS	Cmb	Solo	Ast	Sck	TFL	Int	Yds	Avg	Lng	TD	PD	FF	Fum	FR	Yds	TD
2025	LAR	3	0	6	2	4	0.0	0	0	0	0.0	0	0	0	0	0	0	0	0
Career		3	0	6	2	4	0.0	0	0	0	0.0	0	0	0	0	0	0	0	0
