= 2022 Charlotte 49ers football team =

American college football season

2022 Charlotte 49ers football
- Conference: Conference USA
- Record: 3–9 (2–6 C-USA)
- Head coach: Will Healy (4th season; first 8 games); Peter Rossomando (interim; remainder of season)
- Offensive coordinator: Mark Carney (3rd season)
- Offensive scheme: Spread option
- Defensive coordinator: Greg Brown (1st season)
- Base defense: 4–3
- Home stadium: Jerry Richardson Stadium

2022 Conference USA football standings
	Conf.			Overall
Team	W		L	W		L
UTSA y$	8	–	0	11	–	3
Western Kentucky	6	–	2	9	–	5
North Texas y	6	–	2	7	–	7
Middle Tennessee	4	–	4	8	–	5
UAB	4	–	4	7	–	6
Florida Atlantic	4	–	4	5	–	7
Rice	3	–	5	5	–	8
UTEP	3	–	5	5	–	7
FIU	2	–	6	4	–	8
Charlotte	2	–	6	3	–	9
Louisiana Tech	2	–	6	3	–	9
Championship: UTSA 48, North Texas 27
$ – Conference champion; y – Championship game participant; Rankings from AP Poll

The 2022 Charlotte 49ers football team represented the University of North Carolina at Charlotte in the 2022 NCAA Division I FBS football season. The 49ers played their home games at Jerry Richardson Stadium in Charlotte, North Carolina, and competed in Conference USA (C–USA). They were led by fourth-year head coach Will Healy. Charlotte fired Healy after eight games; offensive line coach Peter Rossomando finished out the season.

== Coaching staff ==
On February 14, tight ends coach Joe Cox left to take the same position at Alabama. On February 16 Healy announced the hiring of Greg Brown as co-defensive coordinator and Kap Dede as secondary coach. At the same time grad assistant Tyler Chadwick was promoted to tight ends coach. Assistant head coach and co-defensive coordinator Marcus West departed the program on February 24 to become the NFL's Buffalo Bills assistant defensive line coach. On March 16 Brian Baker came on board to coach defensive line. On April 7 Cordae Hankton was named running backs coach.

On October 23, following the 49ers' seventh loss of the season and loss of a chance to participate in a post-season bowl game, 4th year head coach Will Healy was relieved of his head coaching duties. Offensive line coach and former Central Connecticut head football coach Pete Rossomando was named interim head coach.

On November 15, Michigan associate head coach Biff Poggi was named the 49ers' third head coach of the modern era. Rossomando finished out the season as interim head coach with a Senior Day win over Louisiana Tech.

Name	Position	Seasons at Charlotte	Alma mater
Will Healy	Head coach (first 8 games)	4	Richmond (2008)
Pete Rossomando	Offensive line coach, interim head coach, (last 4 games)	2	Boston U. (1995)
Greg Brown	Defensive coordinator/secondary coach	1	UTEP (1980)
Mark Carney	Offensive coordinator/quarterbacks coach	4	Fordham (2004)
Brian Baker	Defensive line coach	1	Maryland (1985)
Adam Braithwaite	Linebackers coach	3	William and Mary (2002)
Tyler Chadwick	Tight ends coach	4	Coastal Carolina (2016)
Kap Dede	Defensive backs coach	1	Auburn (2012)
Tyler Hancock	Special teams coordinator	2	Kentucky Wesleyan (2012)
Cordae Hankton	Runningbacks coach	1	Jackson St. (2007)
Perry Parks	Wide receivers coach	2	Coastal (2007)

== Recruiting ==
=== Recruiting class ===
The following recruits and transfers have signed letters of intent or verbally committed to the Charlotte 49ers football program for the 2022 recruiting year.

College recruiting (2022)
Name	Hometown	School	Height	Weight	40^{‡}	Commit date
Micah Bell; RB	McDonough, GA	Ola HS	5 ft 10 in (1.78 m)	200 lb (91 kg)	–	Sep 15, 2021
Micah Bell; RB	Recruit ratings: Scout: Rivals: 247Sports: ESPN:					
Boston Brinkley; OL	Fort Mill, SC	Fort Mill HS	6 ft 3 in (1.91 m)	283 lb (128 kg)	–	Nov 15, 2021
Boston Brinkley; OL	Recruit ratings: Scout: Rivals: 247Sports: ESPN:					
Antonio Gaines; OL	Columbia, SC	Ridge View HS	6 ft 4 in (1.93 m)	310 lb (140 kg)	–	Sep 15, 2021
Antonio Gaines; OL	Recruit ratings: Scout: Rivals: 247Sports: ESPN:					
Reggie Givhan; WR	Kennesaw, GA	North Cobb HS	5 ft 10 in (1.78 m)	170 lb (77 kg)	–	Dec 15, 2021
Reggie Givhan; WR	Recruit ratings: Rivals: ESPN:					
Cade Goldman; OL	Harrisburg, NC	Hickory Ridge HS	6 ft 4 in (1.93 m)	260 lb (120 kg)	–	Jun 23, 2021
Cade Goldman; OL	Recruit ratings: Scout: Rivals: 247Sports: ESPN:					
Aveon Grose; S	Mansfield, OH	Mansfield Senior HS	6 ft 0 in (1.83 m)	190 lb (86 kg)	–	Sep 15, 2021
Aveon Grose; S	Recruit ratings: Scout: Rivals: 247Sports: ESPN:					
Johnny Martin III; RB	Sicklerville, NJ	St. Thomas More Academy	5 ft 10 in (1.78 m)	215 lb (98 kg)	–	Feb 2, 2022
Johnny Martin III; RB	Recruit ratings: Rivals: ESPN:					
Braedon McAlister; K	Indian Trail, NC	Porter Ridge HS	6 ft 2 in (1.88 m)	180 lb (82 kg)	–	Aug 16, 2021
Braedon McAlister; K	Recruit ratings: Scout: Rivals: 247Sports: ESPN:					
Jake McTaggart; TE	Hayesville, NC	Hayesville HS	6 ft 6 in (1.98 m)	235 lb (107 kg)	–	Sep 15, 2021
Jake McTaggart; TE	Recruit ratings: Scout: Rivals: 247Sports: ESPN:					
Maguire Neal; LB	Zephyrhills, FL	Zephyrhills HS	6 ft 1 in (1.85 m)	195 lb (88 kg)	–	Jul 5, 2021
Maguire Neal; LB	Recruit ratings: Scout: Rivals: 247Sports: ESPN:					
Kendall Stanley; OL	Charlotte, NC	Rocky River HS	6 ft 6 in (1.98 m)	320 lb (150 kg)	–	Nov 24, 2021
Kendall Stanley; OL	Recruit ratings: Scout: Rivals: 247Sports: ESPN:					
Roger Walters; WR	Port St. Lucie HS	St. Lucie West Centennial HS	5 ft 10 in (1.78 m)	170 lb (77 kg)	–	Sep 15, 2021
Roger Walters; WR	Recruit ratings: Scout: Rivals: 247Sports: ESPN:					
Reid Williford; LB	Nashville, TN	CPA	6 ft 2 in (1.88 m)	195 lb (88 kg)	–	Sep 15, 2021
Reid Williford; LB	Recruit ratings: Scout: Rivals: 247Sports: ESPN:					
Overall recruit ranking: Scout: 113 Rivals: N/A 247Sports: 113 ESPN: N/A
‡ Refers to 40-yard dash; Note: In many cases, Scout, Rivals, 247Sports, On3, and ESPN may conflict in their listings of height, weight and 40 time.; In these cases, the average was taken. ESPN grades are on a 100-point scale.; Sources: "Charlotte Football Commitments". Rivals.; "2022 Charlotte Football Commits". Scout.; "ESPN". ESPN.; "Scout.com Team Recruiting Rankings". Scout.; "2022 Team Ranking". Rivals.com.

=== Key transfers ===
Player	Position	Previous	Home town	High school	Class	Height	Weight
Wayne Jones	Linebacker	Northwestern	Fort Owasso, OK	Owasso HS	SR	6'-0"	208 lbs
Chase Monroe	Linebacker	Wake Forest	Davidson, NC	Davidson Day	Grad	6'-2"	225 lbs
Eugene Minter	Wide receiver	Austin Peay	Birmingham, AL	Parker HS	R-SR	6'-3"	215 lbs
Amir Siddiq	Linebacker	Central Michigan	Dearborn, MI	Fordson HS	Grad	6'-3"	210 lbs
Cade White	Linebacker	Monroe College	Pewee Valley, KT	South Oldham HS	SO	6'-2"	210 lbs

=== Roster ===
2022 Charlotte 49ers football team roster
Players
Coaches
Offense

Pos.	#	Name	Class
QB	0	Trexler Ivey	RSo
WR	1	Victor Tucker (C)	RSr
RB	2	Calvin Camp	RSr
QB	3	Chris Reynolds (C)	RSr
WR	4	Jairus Mack	So
WR	5	Roger Waters	Fr
RB	6	Chavon McEachern	RSo
QB	7	James Foster	RJr
QB	8	Xavier Williams	RFr
WR	9	Elijah Spencer	So
WR	10	Nolan Groulx	RJr
TE	11	Taylor Thompson	RSo
TE	12	Donta Armstrong	RSo
RB	13	Shadrick Byrd	RSo
WR	14	Grant DuBose	Jr
TE	15	Eugene Minter Jr.	RSr
WR	16	Kendric Blake Jr.	RJr
QB	17	Steven Johnson	Fr
TE	18	Colin Weber	RFr
WR	19	Trey Blount	RSr
WR	20	Xander Lamb	Fr
RB	21	Henry Rutledge	RFr
WR	22	Jack Reynolds	RFr
RB	23	Micah Bell	Fr
RB	24	Johnny Martin III	Fr
RB	30	Jaylen Donaldson	Fr
RB	33	Watson Cusick	Fr
TE	34	Colin Frank	Fr
RB	38	Hahsaun Wilson	RFr
OL	52	Jonny King	RSo
OL	53	Panda Askew	RSo
OL	55	Jon Jacobs	RSr
OL	57	Ashton Gist	RSr
OL	58	Michael Statham Jr.	RFr
OL	61	Marshall Futrell	RFr
OL	62	Cade Goldman	Fr
OL	63	Trevor Timmons	RFr
OL	64	Will Moon	Fr
OL	65	Boston Brinkley	Fr
OL	66	Kendall Stanley	Fr
OL	69	Navardo Miller	RJr
OL	70	Matt Rosso	RJr
OL	71	Arabee Muslim	RSo
OL	72	Cameron Clark	RSo
OL	73	Isaiah Bullerdick	Fr
OL	74	Knox Boyd	RFr
OL	75	T.J. Moore	RSr
OL	76	Jordan Brown	RFr
OL	77	Jaxon Hughes	RJr
OL	78	Brice Boyd	Fr
OL	79	Antonio Gaines	Fr
TE	81	Jake Clemons	RSo
WR	82	Elisha Edwards	Fr
WR	83	Sean Brown	RSo
WR	84	Reggie Givhan III	Fr
TE	86	Bryce Kennon	RSo
WR	87	Charlie C. C. Fish III	RFr
TE	88	Jake McTaggart	Fr
WR	89	Quinton Patten	RJr

Defense

Pos.	#	Name	Class
DE	0	Markees Watts (C)	RSr
DL	1	Amir Siddiq	RSr
LB	2	Derek Boykins	RSo
DB	3	Trey Creamer	RSr
CB	4	Geo Howard	RSr
DB	5	Wayne Jones	RJr
DB	6	Soloman Rogers	Sr
DE	7	Kofi Wardlow	RSr
LB	8	Cam Burden	RFr
DB	9	Valerian Agbaw	RSo
DB	10	Davondre "Tank" Robinson	RSr
DE	11/98	Tyson Clawson	So
DB	13	Briston Bennett	RSo
S	14	Steven Parker	RFr
DB	15	Jarvis "Juice" Martin	RSo
DB	16	Jordan Anderson	RJr
DB	18	Lance McMillan	RSr
LB	19	Comanche Frncisco	RSo
CB	20	Doug Newsome	So
LB	21	Shyhiem Scotland	RFr
DB	22	Marcus Robitaille	RJr
DB	23	Aveon Grose	Fr
DB	24	Lacy Williams	RJr
LB	25	Prince Bemah	RJr
DB	26	Shamar Baker	Jr
DB	27	Bryson Whitehead	RJr
DB	28	Cade White	So
DB	29	Maguire Neal	Fr
DB	31	Trey Bly	RJr
DB	32	John Anderson	RFr
DB	35	J'Trell Washington	RFr
LB	36	D.J. Brown	RFr
DB	38	Jamari Broady	Fr
CB	39	Teddy Creecy III	RJr
LB	40	Reid Williford	Fr
DB	41	Luke Raykovicz	Fr
LB	43	Isaiah Turnage	RFr
LB	44	B.J. Turner	RSr
DB	46	Omari Orgertrice	Fr
LB	47	Chase Monroe	RSr
DL	48	Barutti Mazangu	RSo
DL	50	Darion Smith	RSo
DL	51	B.J. Ragland	RFr
LB	52	Stone Handy	Jr
DL	53	Michael Kelly	RJr
DT	55	Isaiah Potts	RFr
DL	56	Jordan Moore	RSo
DL	90	Dez Morgan	RSo
DL	91	Larry Avila	Fr
DE	92	Miles Posey	RFr
DL	93	Devin Reed	Fr
DE	95	Miguel Jackson	RFr
DL	96	Isaac Hampton	RSr
DL	97	Jalar Holley	RSo
DL	99	Isaac Washington	So

Special teams

Pos.	#	Name	Class
K	17	Braeden McAlister	Fr
K	17	Antonio Zita	Sr
K	33	Aidan Laros	RFr
P	37	Bailey Rice	So
LS	45	Cameron Lyons	RSr
LS	54	Adam Booker	Fr

Head coach

- Will Healy (Richmond)
- Pete Rossomando (Boston University)
  Interim Head coach/Offensive Line

Coordinators/assistant coaches

- Greg Brown (Memphis)
  Defensive coordinator/defensive backs
- Mark Carney (Fordham)
  Offensive coordinator/quarterbacks
- Brian Baker (Maryland)
  Defensive line
- Adam Braithwaite (William & Mary)
  Linebackers
- Tyler Chadwick (Coastal Carolina)
  Tight ends
- Cordae Hankton (Jackson State)
  Running backs
- Kap Dede (Auburn)
  Defensive backs
- Tyler Hancock (Kentucky Wesleyan)
  Special teams coordinator
- Perry Parks (Coastal Carolina)
  Wide receivers

Legend

- (C) Team captain
- (S) Suspended
- (I) Ineligible
- Injured
- Redshirt

Roster

=== Depth chart ===
Defense
4–3

FS
AVEON GROSE
Lucy Williams
Steven Parker

WLB	MLB	SLB
REID WILLIFORD	B. J. TURNER	PRINCE BEMAH
Maguire Neal	Chase Monroe	Cam Burden
⋅	⋅	D. J. Brown

SS
SOLOMON ROGERS
Tank Robinson
Comanche Francisco

CB
BRYSON WHITEHEAD
Trey Bly
Teddy Creecy

DE	DT	DT	DE
MARKEES WATTS	DEZ MORGAN	MIGUEL JACKSON	AMIR SIDDIQ
Kofi Wardlow	Barutti Mazangu	Jalar Holley	Darion Smith
⋅	⋅	Isaac Hampton	Tyson Clawson

CB
GEO HOWARD
Doug Newsome
Valerian Agbaw

Offense
Pro-style

WR
VICTOR TUCKER
Nolan Groulx
Jack Reynolds

WR
ELIJAH SPENCER
Trey Blount
⋅

LT	LG	C	RG	RT
JAXON HUGHES	PANDA ASKEW	ASHTON GIST	JONNY KING	MATT ROSSO
Jordan Brown	Antonio Gaines	Isaiah Bullerdick	Knox Boyd	Jon Jacobs
⋅	Trevor Timmons	⋅	⋅	Arabee Muslim

TE
JAKE CLEMMONS
Taylor Thompson
Eugene Minter III

WR
GRANT DUBOSE
Quinton Patton
Sean Brown

QB
CHRIS REYNOLDS
James Foster
Xavier Williams

Special teams
PK Antonio Zita
PK Aidan Laros
P Bailey Rice
P Ethan Torres
KR Shadrick Byrd/Henry Rutledge
PR Grant DuBose/Victor Tucker
LS Cameron Lyons
H Bailey Rice

RB
SHADRICK BYRD
Henry Rutledge
Calvin Camp

== Awards and honors ==
=== Preseason ===
Awards Watch List	Player	Position	Year
Maxwell Award	Chris Reynolds	QB	RSR
Davey O'Brien Award	Chris Reynolds	QB	RSR
Biletnikoff Award	Grant DuBose	WR	JR
Hornung Award	Shadrick Byrd	RB	RSO
Wuerffel Trophy	Kendric Blake Jr.	WR	RJR
Manning Award	Chris Reynolds	QB	RSR
Johnny Unitas Golden Arm Award	Chris Reynolds	QB	RSR

=== In season ===
Awards Watch List	Player	Position	Year
Manning Award Star of the Week (x2)	Chris Reynolds	QB	RSR
Davey O'Brien Award Great 8 (x2)	Chris Reynolds	QB	RSR
Hornung Award Weekly Honor Roll (x2)	Shadrick Byrd	RB	RSO
Biletnikoff Award	Elijah Spencer	WR	SO
Burlsworth Trophy Semifinalist	Chris Reynolds	QB	RSR

Award	Player	Position	Year	Game
Conference USA Offensive Player of the Week	Chris Reynolds	QB	RSR	Rice
Conference USA Special Teams Player of the Week	Shadrick Byrd	RB	RSO	Rice

=== Postseason ===
Conference Award	Player	Position	Year
C-USA All-Academic Team	Davondre "Tank" Robinson	S	Grad
C-USA All-Conference Second Team	Grant DuBose	WR	JR
C-USA All-Conference Second Team	Amir Siddiq	DE	RSR
C-USA All-Freshman Team	Maguire Neal	DB	FR
C-USA All-Freshman Team	Reid Williford	LB	FR

All Conference Honorable Mentions:

Offense: QB – Chris Reynolds, R-Sr. • WR – Elijah Spencer, So. • OL – Ashton Gist, Sr.

Defense: DE – Markees Watts, R-Sr. • CB – Geo Howard, R-Sr.

Special Teams: KR – Shadrick Byrd, R-So.

== Schedule ==
Date	Time	Opponent	Site	TV	Result	Attendance
August 27	7:00 p.m.	at Florida Atlantic	FAU Stadium; Boca Raton, FL	CBSSN	L 13–43	19,571
September 2	7:00 p.m.	William & Mary*	Jerry Richardson Stadium; Charlotte, NC	ESPN3	L 24–41	13,940
September 10	3:30 p.m.	Maryland*	Jerry Richardson Stadium; Charlotte, NC	Stadium	L 21–56	12,614
September 17	7:00 p.m.	at Georgia State*	Center Parc Stadium; Atlanta, GA	ESPN+	W 42–41	16,433
September 24	7:30 p.m.	at South Carolina*	Williams–Brice Stadium; Columbia, SC	ESPNU	L 20–56	77,982
October 1	6:00 p.m.	UTEP	Jerry Richardson Stadium; Charlotte, NC	ESPN+	L 35–41	9,547
October 15	3:30 p.m.	at UAB	Protective Stadium; Birmingham, AL	Stadium	L 20–34	22,101
October 22	3:30 p.m.	FIU^{†}	Jerry Richardson Stadium; Charlotte, NC	ESPN3	L 15–34	10,576
October 29	2:00 p.m.	at Rice	Rice Stadium; Houston, TX	ESPN3	W 56–23	18,187
November 5	12:00 p.m.	Western Kentucky	Jerry Richardson Stadium; Charlotte, NC	CBSSN	L 7–59	10,857
November 12	3:30 p.m.	at Middle Tennessee	Johnny "Red" Floyd Stadium; Murfreesboro, TN	ESPN3	L 14–24	9,806
November 19	3:30 p.m.	Louisiana Tech	Jerry Richardson Stadium; Charlotte, NC	ESPN3/ESPN+	W 26–21	7,905
*Non-conference game; ^{†}Homecoming; Rankings from AP Poll and CFP Rankings; All times are in Eastern time

== Television ==
Charlotte 49ers home games and conference road games were broadcast through Conference USA's television partners ESPN, CBS Sports, and Stadium.

== Radio ==
Radio coverage for all games was broadcast by IMG College through the Charlotte 49ers Radio Network flagship station WZGV ESPN Radio 730 AM The Game, and the TuneIn Charlotte 49ers IMG Sports Network app. The radio announcers were "Voice of the 49ers" Matt Swierad with play-by-play alongside NFL veteran Al Wallace providing color commentary and Bobby Rosinski and Walker Mehl providing sideline reports.

== Preseason media poll ==
The preseason poll was released on July 25, 2022.

Media poll
Predicted finish	Team	1st place votes
1	UTSA	14
2	UAB	8
3	WKU	
4	Florida Atlantic	
5	North Texas	
6	UTEP	
7	Charlotte	
8	Middle Tennessee	
9	Louisiana Tech	
10	Rice	
11	FIU	

== Game summaries ==
=== Florida Atlantic ===
Charlotte vs Florida Atlantic

Team	1	2	3	4	Total
49ers	7	0	6	0	13
• Owls	10	16	7	10	43

- Date: August 27
- Location: FAU Stadium
  Boca Raton, FL
- Game start: 7:08 pm EDT
- Elapsed time: 3:22
- Game attendance: 19,571
- Game weather: 87 °F (31 °C) • Weather: Sunny• Wind: 0 MPH
- Referee: Patrick Foy
- TV announcers (CBSSN): Chris Hassel, Robert Turbin

Scoring summary
1	12:16	CHAR	Grant DUBOSE 52 yd pass from Chris REYNOLDS (Antonio ZITA kick) 5 plays, 75 yards	CHAR 7–0
1	11:25	FAU	Larry MCCAMMON 52 yd run (Morgan SUAREZ kick)	TIED 7–7
1	6:12	FAU	Morgan SUAREZ 43 yd field goal 7 plays, 45 yards	FAU 10–7
2	8:42	FAU	N'Kosi PERRY 2 yd run (Morgan SUAREZ kick)	FAU 17–7
2	3:56	FAU	Morgan SUAREZ 19 yd field goal 10 plays, 65 yards	FAU 20–7
2	0:17	FAU	Justin MCKITHEN 63 yd interception	FAU 26–7
3	11:27	FAU	Je'Quan BURTON 30 yd pass from N'Kosi PERRY (Morgan SUAREZ kick)	FAU 33–7
3	1:55	CHAR	Grant DUBOSE 20 yd pass from Chris REYNOLDS	FAU 33–13
4	14:03	FAU	Zuberi MOBLEY 1 yd run (Morgan SUAREZ kick), 8 plays, 65 yards	FAU 40–13
4	7:41	FAU	Morgan SUAREZ 42 yd field goal 11 plays, 41 yards	FAU 43–14

Game notes:

- 8th game in the series since 2015, (FAU 6–2).

Team	Category	Player	Statistics
Charlotte	Passing	Chris Reynolds	14–19, 196 yards, 2 TD
Charlotte	Rushing	Shadrick Byrd	14 rushes, 51 yards, 2 TD
Charlotte	Receiving	Grant DuBose	4 receptions, 89 yards, 2 TD
Florida Atlantic	Passing	N'Kosi Perry	16–22, 256 yards, 1 TD
Florida Atlantic	Rushing	Larry McCammon	14 rushes, 118 yards, 1 TD
Florida Atlantic	Receiving	LaJohntay Wester	4 receptions, 66 yards

Statistics	CHAR	FAU
First downs	11	26
Total yards	279	482
Rushing yards	62	218
Passing yards	217	264
Turnovers	1	0
Time of possession	25:04	34:56

=== William & Mary ===
William & Mary vs Charlotte

Team	1	2	3	4	Total
• Tribe	10	7	3	21	41
49ers	3	14	7	0	24

- Date: September 2
- Location: Jerry Richardson Stadium
  Charlotte, NC
- Game start: 7:02 pm EDT
- Elapsed time: 3:28
- Game attendance: 13,940
- Game weather: 87 °F (31 °C) • Weather: Clear• Wind: NW 2 MPH
- Referee: Scott Hardin
- TV announcers (ESPN3): Bobby Rosinski, Reginald Walker Jr.

Scoring summary
1	12:17	W&M	Ethan CHANG 36 Yd Field Goal	W&M 3–0
1	5:19	CHAR	Antonio ZITA 32 Yd Field Goal	TIED 3–3
1	4:28	W&M	Tyler ROSE 31 Yd pass from Darius WILSON (Ethan CHANG Kick)	W&M 10–3
2	10:22	W&M	Donavyn LESTER 22 Yd Run (Ethan CHANG Kick)	W&M 17–3
2	6:34	CHAR	ChaVon MCEACHERN 3 Yd Run (Antonio ZITA Kick)	W&M 17–10
2	0:13	CHAR	Xavier WILLIAMS 2 Yd Run (Antonio ZITA Kick)	TIED 17–17
3	4:30	W&M	Ethan CHANG 28 Yd Field Goal	W&M 20–17
3	2:18	CHAR	Xavier WILLIAMS 67 Yd Run (Antonio ZITA Kick)	CHAR 24–20
4	12:31	W&M	Bronson YODER 1 Yd Run (Ethan CHANG Kick)	W&M 27–24
4	9:54	W&M	Lachlan PITTS 65 Yd pass from Darius WILSON (Ethan CHANG Kick)	W&M 34–24
4	7:38	W&M	Malachi IMOH 17 Yd Run (Ethan CHANG Kick)	W&M 41–24

Game notes:

- First meeting between these two programs.
- Tribe head coach Mike London was 49ers' head coach Will Healy's head coach when he played for the Richmond Spiders.

Team	Category	Player	Statistics
William & Mary	Passing	Darius Wilson	12–18, 237 yards, 2 TD
William & Mary	Rushing	Bronson Yoder	15 rushes, 120 yards, 1 TD
William & Mary	Receiving	Lacklan Pitts	1 reception, 65 yards, 1 TD
Charlotte	Passing	Xavier Williams	12–23, 201 yards
Charlotte	Rushing	Xavier Williams	10 rushes, 48 yards, 2 TD
Charlotte	Receiving	Elijah Spencer	5 receptions, 107 yards

Statistics	W&M	CHAR
First downs	25	22
Total yards	559	379
Rushing yards	303	131
Passing yards	256	248
Turnovers	0	0
Time of possession	32:05	27:55

=== Maryland ===
Maryland vs Charlotte

Team	1	2	3	4	Total
• Terrapins	21	14	14	7	56
49ers	7	7	0	7	21

- Date: September 10
- Location: Jerry Richardson Stadium
  Charlotte, NC
- Game start: 3:34 pm EDT
- Elapsed time: 3:15
- Game attendance: 12,614
- Game weather: 69 °F (21 °C) • Weather: Rain• Wind: 0 MPH
- Referee: Ron Sondgrass
- TV announcers (Stadium): Chris Hassel, Patrick Murray

Scoring summary
1	13:10	UMD	Jacob COPELAND 39 Yd pass from Taulia TAGOVAILOA (Chad RYLAND Kick)	UMD 7–1
1	5:58	CHAR	Grant DUBOSE 11 Yd pass from Xavier WILLIAMS (Antonio ZITA Kick)	TIED 7–7
1	5:28	UMD	Jeshaun JONES 14 Yd pass from Taulia TAGOVAILOA (Chad RYLAND Kick)	UMD 14–7
1	1:18	UMD	Antwain LITTLEJOHN II 59 Yd Run (Chad RYLAND Kick)	UMD 21–7
2	14:25	CHAR	Victor TUCKER 19 Yd pass from Xavier WILLIAMS (Antonio ZITA Kick)	UMD 21–14
2	12:55	UMD	T. TAGOVAILOA pass, to J. COPELAND for 45 yds for a TD, (C. RYLAND KICK)	UMD 28–14
2	4:47	UMD	T. TAGOVAILOA pass, to J. JONES for 16 yds for a TD, (C. RYLAND KICK)	UMD 35–14
3	6:48	UMD	T. TAGOVAILOA run for 4 yds for a TD, (C. RYLAND KICK)	UMD 42–14
3	3:28	UMD	Colby MCDONALD 49 Yd Run (Chad RYLAND Kick)	UMD 49–14
4	12:55	UMD	Octavian SMITH JR. 17 Yd pass from Billy EDWARDS Jr. (Chad RYLAND Kick)	UMD 56–14
4	7:49	CHAR	Victor TUCKER 5 Yd pass from Trexler IVEY (Antonio ZITA Kick)	UMD 56–21

Game notes:

- First meeting between these two programs.

Team	Category	Player	Statistics
Maryland	Passing	Taulia Tagovailoa	27–31, 391 yards, 4 TD, 1 INT
Maryland	Rushing	Colby McDonald	4 rushes, 61 yards, 1 TD
Maryland	Receiving	Jacob Copeland	4 reception, 110 yards, 2 TD
Charlotte	Passing	Xavier Williams	19–35, 191 yards, 2 TD
Charlotte	Rushing	Shadrick Byrd	11 rushes, 38 yards
Charlotte	Receiving	Elijah Spencer	4 receptions, 98 yards

Statistics	UMD	CHAR
First downs	26	24
Total yards	612	388
Rushing yards	193	96
Passing yards	419	292
Turnovers	1	0
Time of possession	28:46	31:14

=== Georgia State ===
Charlotte vs Georgia State

Team	1	2	3	4	Total
• 49ers	7	14	7	14	42
Panthers	14	6	7	14	41

- Date: September 17
- Location: Center Parc Stadium
  Atlanta, GA
- Game start: 7:02 pm EDT
- Elapsed time: 3:54
- Game attendance: 16,433
- Game weather: 75 °F (24 °C) • Weather: Sunny• Wind: 0 MPH
- Referee: Rodney Burnette
- TV announcers (ESPN+): Matt Stewart, Sam Crenshaw

Scoring summary
1	11:30	GAST	Kris BYRD 9 Yd pass from Darren GRAINGER (Michael HAYES Kick)	GAST 7–0
1	7:56	CHAR	Grant DUBOSE 7 Yd pass from Chris REYNOLDS (Antonio ZITA Kick)	TIED 7–7
1	6:21	GAST	Robert LEWIS 34 Yd pass from Darren GRAINGER (Michael HAYES Kick)	GAST 14–7
2	14:50	CHAR	Markees WATTS 52 Yd Fumble Return (Antonio ZITA Kick)	TIED 14–14
2	9:04	CHAR	Victor TUCKER 2 Yd pass from Chris REYNOLDS (Antonio ZITA Kick)	CHAR 21–14
2	7:29	GAST	Tucker GREGG 2 Yd Run (Michael HAYES PAT failed)	CHAR 21–20
3	12:10	CHAR	Elijah SPENCER 7 Yd pass from Chris REYNOLDS (Antonio ZITA Kick)	CHAR 28–20
3	8:28	GAST	Kris BYRD 6 Yd pass from Darren GRAINGER (Michael HAYES Kick)	CHAR 28–27
4	14:50	CHAR	Henry RUTLEDGE 31 Yd pass from Chris REYNOLDS (Antonio ZITA Kick)	CHAR 35–27
4	11:00	GAST	Tucker GREGG 2 Yd Run (Two-Point Pass Conversion Failed)	CHAR 35–33
4	1:39	GAST	Jamari THRASH 32 Yd pass from Darren GRAINGER (Darren GRAINGER Run for Two-Point	GAST 41–35
4	0:17	CHAR	Grant DUBOSE 2 Yd pass from Chris REYNOLDS (Antonio ZITA Kick)	CHAR 42–41

Game notes:

- Chris Reynolds' 5 touchdown passes ties the school in-game TD record.
- 4th game in the series since 2015, (Tied 2–2).

Team	Category	Player	Statistics
Charlotte	Passing	Chris Reynolds	31–43, 401 yards, 5 TD, 1 INT
Charlotte	Rushing	ChaVon McEachern	13 rushes, 76 yards
Charlotte	Receiving	Elijah Spencer	5 receptions, 96 yards, 1 TD
Georgia State	Passing	Darren Grainger	22–34, 343 yards, 4 TD, 1 INT
Georgia State	Rushing	Tucker Gregg	23 rushes, 100 yards, 2 TD
Georgia State	Receiving	Jamari Thrash	10 receptions, 213 yards, 1 TD

Statistics	CHAR	GAST
First downs	26	34
Total yards	501	602
Rushing yards	100	259
Passing yards	401	343
Turnovers	1	2
Time of possession	29:15	30:45

=== South Carolina ===
Charlotte vs South Carolina

Team	1	2	3	4	Total
49ers	7	7	0	6	20
• Gamecocks	3	17	22	14	56

- Date: September 24
- Location: Williams-Brice Stadium
  Columbia, SC
- Game start: 7:35 pm EDT
- Elapsed time: 3:32
- Game attendance: 77,982
- Game weather: 75 °F (24 °C) • Weather: Clear• Wind: S 4 MPH
- Referee: Matt Loeffler
- TV announcers (ESPNU): Jay Alter, Forrest Conoly, Tamara Brown

Scoring summary
1	9:54	USC	Mitch JETER 25 Yd Field Goal	USC 3–0
1	2:48	CHAR	Jake CLEMONS 2 Yd pass from Chris REYNOLDS (Antonio ZITA Kick)	CHAR 7–3
2	14:52	USC	MarShawn LLOYD 25 Yd Run (Mitch JETER Kick)	USC 10–7
2	9:43	CHAR	Victor TUCKER 14 Yd pass from Chris REYNOLDS (Antonio ZITA Kick)	CHAR 14–10
2	6:29	USC	Christian BEAL-SMITH Yd Run (Mitch JETER Kick)	USC 17–14
2	0:02	USC	Mitch JETER 27 Yd Field Goal	USC 20–14
3	10:25	USC	MarShawn LLOYD 14 Yd Run (Traevon KENION Run for Two-Point Conversion)	USC 28–14
3	8:34	USC	MarShawn LLOYD 7 Yd Run (Mitch JETER Kick)	USC 35–14
3	6:14	USC	Christian BEAL-SMITH 1 Yd Run (Mitch JETER Kick)	USC 42–14
4	12:20	USC	Juju MCDOWELL 4 Yd Run (Alex HERRERA Kick)	USC 49–14
4	6:43	CHAR	Elijah SPENCER 35 Yd pass from James FOSTER (Two-Point Run Conversion Failed)	USC 49–20
4	1:55	USC	Corey RUCKER 52 Yd pass from Luke DOTY (Alex HERRERA Kick)	USC 56–20

Game notes:

- First meeting between these two programs.

Team	Category	Player	Statistics
Charlotte	Passing	Chris Reynolds	16–28, 143 yards, 2 TD, 2 INT
Charlotte	Rushing	Shadrick Byrd	9 rushes, 33 yards
Charlotte	Receiving	Grant DuBose	4 receptions, 60 yards
South Carolina	Passing	Spencer Rattler	17–23, 187 yards
South Carolina	Rushing	MarShawn Lloyd	15 rushes, 169 yards, 3 TD
South Carolina	Receiving	Jalen Brooks	3 receptions, 67 yards

Statistics	CHAR	USC
First downs	21	28
Total yards	292	545
Rushing yards	79	295
Passing yards	213	250
Turnovers	3	2
Time of possession	33:26	26:34

=== UTEP ===
UTEP vs Charlotte

Team	1	2	3	4	Total
• Miners	7	17	10	7	41
49ers	7	0	14	14	35

- Date: October 1
- Location: Jerry Richardson Stadium
  Charlotte, NC
- Game start: 6:02 pm EDT
- Elapsed time: 3:25
- Game attendance: 9,547
- Game weather: 63 °F (17 °C) • Weather: Cloudy• Wind: SE 4 MPH
- Referee: Rory Bernard
- TV announcers (ESPN+): Bobby Rosinski, Reginald Walker Jr., Hannah Bradey

Scoring summary
1	9:48	CHAR	Grant DUBOSE 23 Yd pass from Chris REYNOLDS (Antonio ZITA Kick)	CHAR 7–0
1	2:01	UTEP	Tyrin SMITH 17 Yd pass from Gavin HARDISON (Gavin BAECHLE Kick)	TIED 7–7
2	8:03	UTEP	Gavin BAECHLE 22 Yd Field Goal	UTEP 10–7
2	0:33	UTEP	Trent THOMPSON 26 Yd pass from Gavin HARDISON (Gavin BAECHLE Kick)	UTEP 17–7
2	0:20	UTEP	Tyrice KNIGHT 13 Yd Fumble Return (Gavin BAECHLE Kick)	UTEP 24–7
3	11:37	CHAR	Elijah SPENCER 23 Yd pass from Chris REYNOLDS (Antonio ZITA Kick)	UTEP 24–14
3	11:03	CHAR	Grant DUBOSE 2 Yd pass from Chris REYNOLDS (Antonio ZITA Kick)	UTEP 24–21
3	8:34	UTEP	Tyrin SMITH 58 Yd pass from Gavin HARDISON (Gavin BAECHLE Kick)	UTEP 31–21
3	0:36	UTEP	Gavin BAECHLE 29 Yd Field Goal	UTEP 34–21
4	13:46	UTEP	Jadrian TAYLOR 100 Yd Fumble Return (Gavin BAECHLE Kick)	UTEP 41–21
4	9:27	CHAR	Victor TUCKER 6 Yd pass from Chris REYNOLDS (Antonio ZITA Kick)	UTEP 41–28
4	3:11	CHAR	Shadrick BYRD 13 Yd Run (Antonio ZITA Kick)	UTEP 41–35

Game notes:

- UTEP's first win in program history in the Eastern Time Zone.
- 3rd game in the series since 2019, (CHAR 2–1).

Team	Category	Player	Statistics
UTEP	Passing	Gavin Hardison	10–14, 173 yards, 3 TD
UTEP	Rushing	Deion Hankins	20 rushes, 112 yards
UTEP	Receiving	Tyrin Smith	4 reception, 106 yards, 2 TD
Charlotte	Passing	Chris Reynolds	21–37, 347 yards, 4 TD, 1 INT
Charlotte	Rushing	Shadrick Byrd	13 rushes, 80 yards, 1 TD
Charlotte	Receiving	Elijah Spencer	7 receptions, 160 yards, 1 TD

Statistics	UTEP	CHAR
First downs	20	27
Total yards	425	447
Rushing yards	252	100
Passing yards	173	347
Turnovers	1	3
Time of possession	33:40	26:20

=== UAB ===
Charlotte vs UAB

Team	1	2	3	4	Total
49ers	14	0	0	6	20
• Blazers	7	3	9	15	34

- Date: October 15
- Location: Protective Stadium
  Birmingham, AL
- Game start: 3:34 pm EDT
- Elapsed time: 3:19
- Game attendance: 22,101
- Game weather: 63 °F (17 °C) • Weather: Cloudy• Wind: SE 4 MPH
- Referee: Ed Ardito
- TV announcers (Stadium): Chris Hassel, Patrick Murray

Scoring summary
1	13:57	CHAR	Elijah SPENCER 60 Yd pass from Chris REYNOLDS (Antonio ZITA Kick)	CHAR 7–0
1	11:56	UAB	DeWayne McBride 1 Yd Run (Matt QUINN Kick)	TIED 7–7
1	2:36	CHAR	Shadrick BYRD 2 Yd Run (Antonio ZITA Kick)	CHAR 14–7
2	1:31	UAB	Matt QUINN 20 Yd Field Goal	CHAR 14–10
3	11:51	UAB	Matt QUINN 29 Yd Field Goal	CHAR 14–13
3	2:15	UAB	Tejhaun PALMER 9 Yd pass from Dylan HOPKINS (Two-Point Run Conversion Failed)	UAB 19–14
4	14:56	CHAR	Shadrick BYRD 1 Yd Run (Two-Point Pass Conversion Failed)	CHAR 20–19
4	12:24	UAB	DeWayne MCBRIDE 13 Yd Run (Trea SHROPSHIRE Pass to Dylan HOPKINS for Two-Point Conversion)	UAB 27–20
4	1:01	UAB	Dylan HOPKINS 61 Yd Run (Matt QUINN Kick)	UAB 34–20

Game notes:

- 3rd game in the series since 2017, (UAB 2–1).

Team	Category	Player	Statistics
Charlotte	Passing	Chris Reynolds	15–26, 214 yards, 1 TD, 2 INT
Charlotte	Rushing	ChaVon McEachern	9 rushes, 61 yards
Charlotte	Receiving	Elijah Spencer	4 receptions, 103 yards, 1 TD
UAB	Passing	Dylan Hopkins	15–23, 231 yards, 1 TD, 1 INT
UAB	Rushing	DeWayne McBride	29 rushes, 137 yards, 2 TD
UAB	Receiving	T. J. Jones	2 receptions, 59 yards

Statistics	CHAR	UAB
First downs	12	27
Total yards	327	510
Rushing yards	113	279
Passing yards	214	231
Turnovers	3	1
Time of possession	23:59	36:01

=== FIU ===
FIU vs Charlotte

Team	1	2	3	4	Total
• Panthers	14	13	7	0	34
49ers	0	0	0	15	15

- Date: October 22
- Location: Jerry Richardson Stadium
  Charlotte, NC
- Game start: 3:30 pm EDT
- Elapsed time: 3:18
- Game attendance: 10,576
- Game weather: 73 °F (23 °C) • Weather: Sunny• Wind: NW 6 MPH
- Referee: Kevin Vicknair
- TV announcers (ESPN3): Bobby Rosinski, Reginald Walker Jr., Hannah Bradey

Scoring summary
1	13:31	FIU	Grayson JAMES 12 Yd Run (Chase GABRIEL Kick)	FIU 7–0
1	8:48	FIU	Grayson JAMES 9 Yd Run (Chase GABRIEL Kick)	FIU 14–0
2	12:02	FIU	Lexington JOSEPH 1 Yd Run (Chase GABRIEL Kick)	FIU 21–0
2	10:04	FIU	Lexington JOSEPH 15 Yd Run (Chase GABRIEL PAT blocked)	FIU 27–0
3	2:54	FIU	Kris MITCHELL 5 Yd pass from Grayson JAMES (Chase GABRIEL Kick)	FIU 34–0
4	12:10	CHAR	Chris REYNOLDS 2 Yd Run (Antonio ZITA Kick)	FIU 34–7
4	1:20	CHAR	Shadrick BYRD 5 Yd pass from James FOSTER (James FOSTER Pass to Taylor THOMPSON for Two-Point Conversion)	FIU 34–15

Game notes:

- With the 7th loss of the season and no possibility of reaching a post-season bowl, Charlotte head coach Will Healy was released after the game.
- 7th game in the series since 2015, (FIU 6–1).

Team	Category	Player	Statistics
FIU	Passing	Grayson James	26–34, 306 yards, 1 TD, 1INT
FIU	Rushing	Lexington Joseph	17 rushes, 72 yards, 2 TD
FIU	Receiving	Tyrese Chambers	10 reception, 143 yards
Charlotte	Passing	Chris Reynolds	23–38, 244 yards, 3 INT
Charlotte	Rushing	Shadrick Byrd	9 rushes, 42 yards
Charlotte	Receiving	Elijah Spencer	6 receptions, 77 yards

Statistics	FIU	CHAR
First downs	25	21
Total yards	453	337
Rushing yards	147	60
Passing yards	306	277
Turnovers	1	5
Time of possession	34:38	25:22

=== Rice ===
Charlotte vs Rice

Team	1	2	3	4	Total
• 49ers	7	21	21	7	56
Rice	14	3	0	6	23

- Date: October 29
- Location: Rice Stadium
  Houston, TX
- Game start: 2:02 pm EDT
- Elapsed time: 3:32
- Game attendance: 18,187
- Game weather: 61 °F (16 °C) • Weather: Sunny• Wind: W 10 MPH
- Referee: Joe Lehring
- TV announcers (ESPN3): David Saltzman, Chris Mycoskie

Scoring summary
1	10:32	RICE	Luke MCCAFFREY 27 Yd pass from TJ MCMAHON (Christian VANSICKLE Kick)	RICE 7–0
1	3:59	CHAR	Johnny MARTIN III 1 Yd Run (Antonio ZITA Kick)	TIED 7–7
1	0:38	RICE	Bradley ROZNER 35 Yd pass from TJ MCMAHON (Christian VANSICKLE Kick)	RICE 14–7
2	11:42	CHAR	Elijah SPENCER 15 Yd pass from Chris REYNOLDS (Antonio ZITA Kick)	TIED 14–14
2	8:22	RICE	Christian VANSICKLE 35 Yd Field Goal	RICE 17–14
2	5:52	CHAR	Shadrick BYRD 4 Yd Run (Antonio ZITA Kick)	CHAR 21–17
2	0:12	CHAR	Elijah SPENCER 10 Yd pass from Chris REYNOLDS (Antonio ZITA Kick)	CHAR 28–17
3	12:57	CHAR	Elijah SPENCER 21 Yd pass from Chris REYNOLDS (Antonio ZITA Kick)	CHAR 35–17
3	7:17	CHAR	Grant DUBOSE 9 Yd pass from Chris REYNOLDS (Antonio ZITA Kick)	CHAR 42–17
3	4:37	CHAR	Victor TUCKER 20 Yd pass from Chris REYNOLDS (Antonio ZITA Kick)	CHAR 49–17
4	9:43	RICE	Bradley ROZNER 29 Yd pass from TJ MCMAHON (Uriah WEST Run for Two-Point Conversion)	CHAR 49–23
4	6:50	CHAR	Calvin CAMP 9 Yd Run (Antonio ZITA Kick)	CHAR 56–23

Game notes:

- Pete Rossomando's debut as 49ers' interim head coach would also be his first at the helm of an FBS program and his first FBS win.
- Senior Chris Reynolds was named C-USA Offensive Player of the Week.
- Sophomore Shadrick Byrd was named C-USA Special Teams Player of the Week.
- 4th game in the series since 2015, (Tied 2–2).

Team	Category	Player	Statistics
Charlotte	Passing	Chris Reynolds	16–19, 254 yards, 5 TD
Charlotte	Rushing	Shadrick Byrd	13 rushes, 83 yards, 1 TD
Charlotte	Receiving	Elijah Spencer	5 receptions, 84 yards, 3 TD
Rice	Passing	T. J. McMahon	18–33, 218 yards, 3 TD, 1 INT
Rice	Rushing	T. J. McMahon	9 rushes, 45 yards
Rice	Receiving	Bradley Rozner	5 receptions, 105 yards, 2 TD

Statistics	CHAR	Rice
First downs	25	20
Total yards	514	370
Rushing yards	239	152
Passing yards	275	218
Turnovers	0	1
Time of possession	31:57	28:03

=== Western Kentucky ===
Western Kentucky vs Charlotte

Team	1	2	3	4	Total
• Hilltoppers	21	14	7	17	59
49ers	0	0	7	0	7

- Date: November 5
- Location: Jerry Richardson Stadium
  Charlotte, NC
- Game start: 12:02 pm EDT
- Elapsed time: 3:17
- Game attendance: 10,857
- Game weather: 72 °F (22 °C) • Weather: Cloudy• Wind: S 9 MPH
- Referee: Rodney Burnett
- TV announcers (CBSSN): Carter Blackburn, Robert Turbin

Scoring summary
1	14:32	WKU	Jaylen HALL 46 Yd pass from Austin REED (Brayden NARVESON Kick)	WKU 7–0
1	11:55	WKU	Daewood DAVIS 7 Yd pass from Austin REED (Brayden NARVESON Kick)	WKU 14–0
1	6:52	WKU	Malachi CORLEY 64 Yd pass from Austin REED (Brayden NARVESON Kick)	WKU 21–0
2	13:00	WKU	Joshua SIMON 17 Yd pass from Austin REED (Brayden NARVESON Kick)	WKU 28–0
2	1:02	WKU	Joey BELJAN 14 Yd pass from Austin REED (Brayden NARVESON Kick)	WKU 35–0
3	10:32	CHAR	Elijah SPENCER 14 Yd pass from Chris REYNOLDS (Antonio ZITA Kick)	WKU 35–7
3	9:58	WKU	Michael MATHISON 19 Yd pass from Austin REED (Brayden NARVESON Kick)	WKU 42–7
4	9:06	WKU	Brayden NARVESON 40 Yd Field Goal	WKU 45–7
4	7:50	WKU	Anthony BRACKENRIDGE 42 Yd Interception Return (Brayden NARVESON Kick)	WKU 52–7
4	0:45	WKU	Dalvin SMITH 5 Yd pass from Darius OCEAN (Brayden NARVESON Kick)	WKU 59–7

Game notes:

- 6th game in the series since 2017, (WKU 5–1).

Team	Category	Player	Statistics
Western Kentucky	Passing	Austin Reed	23–38, 409 yards, 6 TD
Western Kentucky	Rushing	Davion Ervin-Poindexter	3 rushes, 49 yards
Western Kentucky	Receiving	Malachi Corley	6 receptions, 162 yards, 1 TD
Charlotte	Passing	Chris Reynolds	17–27, 196 yards, 1 TD, 1 INT
Charlotte	Rushing	James Martin III	16 rushes, 85 yards
Charlotte	Receiving	Grant DuBose	7 receptions, 88 yards

Statistics	WKU	CHAR
First downs	25	22
Total yards	592	384
Rushing yards	131	161
Passing yards	461	223
Turnovers	0	3
Time of possession	20:26	39:34

=== Middle Tennessee ===
Charlotte vs Middle Tennessee

Team	1	2	3	4	Total
49ers	0	14	0	0	14
• Blue Raiders	0	7	7	10	24

- Date: November 12
- Location: Johnny "Red" Floyd Stadium
  Murfreesboro, TN
- Game start: 3:32 pm EST
- Elapsed time: 3:17
- Game attendance: 9,806
- Game weather: 37 °F (3 °C) • Weather: Cloudy• Wind: NW 8 MPH
- Referee: Rory Bernard
- TV announcers (ESPN3): Jake Rose, Jeremy Kellem, Abigail Martin

Scoring summary
2	13:02	CHAR	Elijah SPENCER 1 Yd pass from Chris REYNOLDS (Antonio ZITA Kick)	CHAR
2	8:23	MTSU	Frank PEASANT 1 Yd Run (Zeke RANKIN Kick)	TIED
2	4:11	CHAR	Grant DUBOSE 24 Yd pass from Chris REYNOLDS (Antonio ZITA Kick)	CHAR
3	11:50	MTSU	Jordan FERGUSON 1 Yd Return of Blocked Punt (Zeke RANKIN Kick)	TIED
4	14:21	MTSU	Frank PEASANT 13 Yd Run (Zeke RANKIN Kick)	MTSU
4	2:53	MTSU	Zeke RANKIN 21 Yd Field Goal	MTSU

Game notes:

- 7th game in the series since 2015, (MTSU 5–2).

Team	Category	Player	Statistics
Charlotte	Passing	Chris Reynolds	28–49, 277 yards, 2 TD, 1 INT
Charlotte	Rushing	Shadrick Byrd	14 rushes, 50 yards
Charlotte	Receiving	Grant DuBose	9 receptions, 112 yards, 1 TD
Middle Tennessee	Passing	Nicholas Vattiato	22–29, 203 yards, 1 INT
Middle Tennessee	Rushing	Frank Peasant	17 rushes, 84 yards, 2 TD
Middle Tennessee	Receiving	Elijah Metcalf	8 receptions, 83 yards

Statistics	CHAR	MTSU
First downs	22	16
Total yards	383	306
Rushing yards	106	103
Passing yards	277	203
Turnovers	2	2
Time of possession	32:44	27:16

=== Louisiana Tech ===
Louisiana Tech vs Charlotte

Team	1	2	3	4	Total
Bulldogs	0	7	0	14	21
• 49ers	0	13	6	7	26

- Date: November 19
- Location: Jerry Richardson Stadium
  Charlotte, NC
- Game start: 3:32 pm EST
- Elapsed time: 3:09
- Game attendance: 7,905
- Game weather: 56 °F (13 °C) • Weather: Cloudy• Wind: SW 10 MPH
- Referee: Joe Lehring
- TV announcers (ESPN3/ESPN+): Bobby Rosinski, Reginald Walker Jr., Hannah Bradey

Scoring summary
2	14:47	CHAR	Antonio ZITA 22 Yd Field Goal	CHAR 3–0
2	8:04	LTECH	Marquis CROSBY 3 Yd Run (Jacob BARNES Kick)	LTECH 7–3
2	3:53	CHAR	Calvin CAMP 4 Yd Run (Antonio ZITA Kick)	CHAR 10–7
2	0:00	CHAR	Antonio ZITA 23 Yd Field Goal	CHAR 13–7
3	4:24	CHAR	Calvin CAMP 25 Yd Run (Two-Point Pass Conversion Failed)	CHAR 19–7
4	12:36	LTECH	Marquis CROSBY 6 Yd Run (Jacob BARNES Kick)	CHAR 19–14
4	5:58	CHAR	Calvin CAMP 33 Yd Run (Antonio ZITA Kick)	CHAR 26–14
4	3:05	LTECH	Marquis CROSBY 11 Yd Run (Jacob BARNES Kick)	CHAR 26–21

Game notes:

- In his final collegiate game, 6th year senior Chris Reynolds became the first 49ers' passer to cross the 10,000 yard passing mark.
- Also in his final collegiate game, senior Calvin Camp crossed the career 1000 yards rushing mark.
- Second meeting in the series since 2021, (Tied 1–1).

Team	Category	Player	Statistics
Louisiana Tech	Passing	Landry Lyddy	23–31, 213 yards, 2 INT
Louisiana Tech	Rushing	Marquis Crosby	21 rushes, 105 yards, 3 TD
Louisiana Tech	Receiving	Cyrus Allen	3 reception, 82 yards
Charlotte	Passing	Chris Reynolds	20–30, 268 yards
Charlotte	Rushing	Calvin Camp	11 rushes, 111 yards, 3 TD
Charlotte	Receiving	Taylor Thompson	4 receptions, 99 yards

Statistics	LATECH	CHAR
First downs	19	20
Total yards	350	414
Rushing yards	137	146
Passing yards	213	268
Turnovers	2	0
Time of possession	32:18	27:42

== Attendance ==
Season	Games	Sellouts	W–L (%)	Attendance	Average	Best
2022	6	0	1–5 (.167)	65,439	10,907	13,940
