= 2022 UAB Blazers football team =

American college football season

2022 UAB Blazers football

Bahamas Bowl champion

Bahamas Bowl, W 24–20 vs. Miami (OH)
- Conference: Conference USA
- Record: 7–6 (4–4 C-USA)
- Head coach: Bryant Vincent (interim; 1st season)
- Offensive coordinator: Darin Hinshaw (1st season)
- Offensive scheme: Spread option
- Defensive coordinator: David Reeves (6th season)
- Base defense: 3–3–5
- Home stadium: Protective Stadium

Uniform
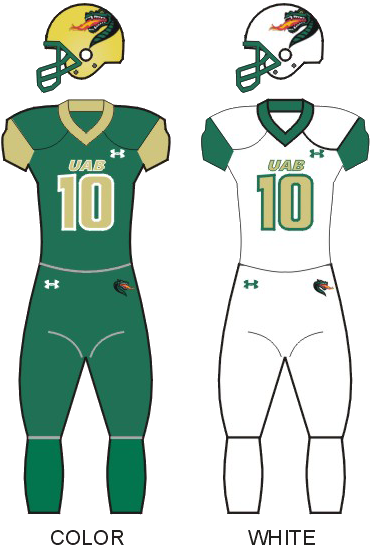

2022 Conference USA football standings
	Conf.			Overall
Team	W		L	W		L
UTSA y$	8	–	0	11	–	3
Western Kentucky	6	–	2	9	–	5
North Texas y	6	–	2	7	–	7
Middle Tennessee	4	–	4	8	–	5
UAB	4	–	4	7	–	6
Florida Atlantic	4	–	4	5	–	7
Rice	3	–	5	5	–	8
UTEP	3	–	5	5	–	7
FIU	2	–	6	4	–	8
Charlotte	2	–	6	3	–	9
Louisiana Tech	2	–	6	3	–	9
Championship: UTSA 48, North Texas 27
$ – Conference champion; y – Championship game participant; Rankings from AP Poll

The 2022 UAB Blazers football team represented the University of Alabama at Birmingham (UAB) as a member of the West Division in Conference USA (C-USA) during the 2022 NCAA Division I FBS football season. Led by interim head coach Bryant Vincent, the Blazers compiled an overall record of 7–6 with a mark of 4–4 in conference play, placing in a three-way tie for fourth in C-USA. UAB was invited to the Bahamas Bowl, where the Blazers defeated the Miami Redhawks. The team played home games at Protective Stadium in Birmingham, Alabama.

During the previous season, on October 21, 2021, UAB accepted the invitation to join the American Athletic Conference (AAC), of which they became a full member on July 1, 2023. On November 30, 2022, Trent Dilfer, former quarterback in the National Football League (NFL), was announced as UAB's new head football coach.

== Schedule ==
UAB and Conference USA announced the 2022 football schedule on March 30, 2022.

Date	Time	Opponent	Site	TV	Result	Attendance
September 1	7:00 p.m.	Alabama A&M*	Protective Stadium; Birmingham, AL	CBSSN	W 59–0	32,542
September 10	5:00 p.m.	at Liberty*	Williams Stadium; Lynchburg, VA	ESPN+	L 14–21	18,892
September 17	2:30 p.m.	Georgia Southern*	Protective Stadium; Birmingham, AL	Stadium	W 35–21	24,302
October 1	6:30 p.m.	at Rice	Rice Stadium; Houston, TX	ESPN+	L 24–28	21,926
October 8	2:30 p.m.	Middle Tennessee	Protective Stadium; Birmingham, AL	Stadium	W 41–14	23,694
October 15	2:30 p.m.	Charlotte	Protective Stadium; Birmingham, AL	Stadium	W 34–20	22,101
October 21	7:00 p.m.	at Western Kentucky	Houchens Industries–L. T. Smith Stadium; Bowling Green, KY	CBSSN	L 17–20	16,334
October 29	6:00 p.m.	at Florida Atlantic	FAU Stadium; Boca Raton, FL	CBSSN	L 17–24	16,138
November 5	2:30 p.m.	UTSA	Protective Stadium; Birmingham, AL	Stadium	L 38–44 ^{2OT}	17,205
November 12	2:30 p.m.	North Texas	Protective Stadium; Birmingham, AL	Stadium	W 41–21	18,504
November 19	8:00 p.m.	at No. 6 LSU*	Tiger Stadium; Baton Rouge, LA	ESPN2	L 10–41	97,367
November 26	2:30 p.m.	at Louisiana Tech	Joe Aillet Stadium; Ruston, LA	CBSSN	W 37–27	10,342
December 16	10:30 a.m.	vs. Miami (OH)*	Thomas Robinson Stadium; Nassau, Bahamas (Bahamas Bowl)	ESPN	W 24–20	12,172
*Non-conference game; Rankings from AP Poll (and CFP Rankings, after November 1) - Released prior to game; All times are in Central time

== Game summaries ==
=== Alabama A&M ===
	1	2	3	4	Total
A&M Bulldogs	0	0	0	0	0
Blazers	28	10	21	0	59

Statistics	AAMU	UAB
First downs	15	25
Total yards	235	478
Rushing yards	98	231
Passing yards	137	247
Turnovers	4	1
Time of possession	30:00	30:00

Team	Category	Player	Statistics
Alabama A&M	Passing	Xavier Lankford	12/22, 115 yards, INT
Alabama A&M	Rushing	Xavier Lankford	10 rushes, 42 yards
Alabama A&M	Receiving	Isiah Cox	2 receptions, 54 yards
UAB	Passing	Dylan Hopkins	13/18, 191 yards, TD
UAB	Rushing	Jermaine Brown Jr.	10 rushes, 114 yards, TD
UAB	Receiving	Tejhaun Palmer	4 receptions, 57 yards

=== At Liberty ===
	1	2	3	4	Total
Blazers	7	0	0	7	14
Flames	0	7	7	7	21

Statistics	UAB	LIB
First downs	15	18
Total yards	355	390
Rushing yards	241	188
Passing yards	114	202
Turnovers	4	1
Time of possession	31:29	28:31

Team	Category	Player	Statistics
UAB	Passing	Dylan Hopkins	10/15, 114 yards, TD
UAB	Rushing	DeWayne McBride	20 rushes, 177 yards, TD
UAB	Receiving	Trea Shropshire	1 reception, 56 yards
Liberty	Passing	Kaidon Salter	13/25, 202 yards
Liberty	Rushing	Kaidon Salter	14 rushes, 79 yards, TD
Liberty	Receiving	Noah Frith	2 receptions, 75 yards

=== Georgia Southern ===
	1	2	3	4	Total
Eagles	0	7	7	7	21
Blazers	7	14	0	14	35

Statistics	GASO	UAB
First downs	23	21
Total yards	418	413
Rushing yards	214	288
Passing yards	204	125
Turnovers	3	0
Time of possession	28:14	31:46

Team	Category	Player	Statistics
Georgia Southern	Passing	Kyle Vantrease	24/50, 204 yards, TD, 3 INT
Georgia Southern	Rushing	Jalen White	14 rushes, 116 yards, 2 TD
Georgia Southern	Receiving	Derwin Burgess Jr.	4 receptions, 48 yards, TD
UAB	Passing	Dylan Hopkins	12/19, 125 yards, TD
UAB	Rushing	DeWayne McBride	28 rushes, 223 yards, 4 TD
UAB	Receiving	Ryan Davis	1 reception, 36 yards

=== At Rice ===
	1	2	3	4	Total
Blazers	7	10	7	0	24
Owls	7	0	14	7	28

Statistics	UAB	RICE
First downs	22	15
Total yards	360	209
Rushing yards	122	105
Passing yards	238	104
Turnovers	2	1
Time of possession	30:00	30:00

Team	Category	Player	Statistics
UAB	Passing	Dylan Hopkins	15/21, 231 yards, 2 TD, INT
UAB	Rushing	DeWayne McBride	27 rushes, 121 yards, TD
UAB	Receiving	Tejhaun Palmer	2 receptions, 82 yards
Rice	Passing	T. J. McMahon	11/17, 104 yards, TD
Rice	Rushing	Cameron Montgomery	5 rushes, 34 yards
Rice	Receiving	Luke McCaffrey	5 receptions, 38 yards

=== Middle Tennessee ===
	1	2	3	4	Total
Blue Raiders	7	0	7	0	14
Blazers	21	17	3	0	41

Statistics	MTSU	UAB
First downs	24	24
Total yards	336	581
Rushing yards	140	303
Passing yards	196	278
Turnovers	1	0
Time of possession	25:40	34:20

Team	Category	Player	Statistics
Middle Tennessee	Passing	Chase Cunningham	26/43, 196 yards, TD, INT
Middle Tennessee	Rushing	Joe Ervin	7 rushes, 54 yards
Middle Tennessee	Receiving	Jaylin Lane	9 receptions, 59 yards, TD
UAB	Passing	Dylan Hopkins	17/27, 278 yards, TD
UAB	Rushing	DeWayne McBride	12 rushes, 120 yards, 3 TD
UAB	Receiving	Trea Shropshire	6 receptions, 193 yards, TD

=== Charlotte ===
Charlotte vs UAB

Team	1	2	3	4	Total
49ers	14	0	0	6	20
• Blazers	7	3	9	15	34

- Date: October 15
- Location: Protective Stadium
  Birmingham, AL
- Game start: 3:34 pm EDT
- Elapsed time: 3:19
- Game attendance: 22,101
- Game weather: 63 °F (17 °C) • Weather: Cloudy• Wind: SE 4 MPH
- Referee: Ed Ardito
- TV announcers (Stadium): Chris Hassel, Patrick Murray

Scoring summary
1	13:57	CHAR	Elijah SPENCER 60 Yd pass from Chris REYNOLDS (Antonio ZITA Kick)	CHAR 7–0
1	11:56	UAB	DeWayne McBride 1 Yd Run (Matt QUINN Kick)	TIED 7–7
1	2:36	CHAR	Shadrick BYRD 2 Yd Run (Antonio ZITA Kick)	CHAR 14–7
2	1:31	UAB	Matt QUINN 20 Yd Field Goal	CHAR 14–10
3	11:51	UAB	Matt QUINN 29 Yd Field Goal	CHAR 14–13
3	2:15	UAB	Tejhaun PALMER 9 Yd pass from Dylan HOPKINS (Two-Point Run Conversion Failed)	UAB 19–14
4	14:56	CHAR	Shadrick BYRD 1 Yd Run (Two-Point Pass Conversion Failed)	CHAR 20–19
4	12:24	UAB	DeWayne MCBRIDE 13 Yd Run (Trea SHROPSHIRE Pass to Dylan HOPKINS for Two-Point Conversion)	UAB 27–20
4	1:01	UAB	Dylan HOPKINS 61 Yd Run (Matt QUINN Kick)	UAB 34–20

Game notes:

- 3rd game in the series since 2017, (UAB 2–1).

Statistics	CHAR	UAB
First downs	12	27
Total yards	327	510
Rushing yards	113	279
Passing yards	214	231
Turnovers	3	1
Time of possession	23:59	36:01

Team	Category	Player	Statistics
Charlotte	Passing	Chris Reynolds	15–26, 214 yards, 1 TD, 2 INT
Charlotte	Rushing	ChaVon McEachern	9 rushes, 61 yards
Charlotte	Receiving	Elijah Spencer	4 receptions, 103 yards, 1 TD
UAB	Passing	Dylan Hopkins	15–23, 231 yards, 1 TD, 1 INT
UAB	Rushing	DeWayne McBride	29 rushes, 137 yards, 2 TD
UAB	Receiving	T. J. Jones	2 receptions, 59 yards

=== At Western Kentucky ===
	1	2	3	4	Total
Blazers	7	10	0	0	17
Hilltoppers	0	10	10	0	20

Statistics	UAB	WKU
First downs	14	19
Total yards	327	352
Rushing yards	231	224
Passing yards	96	128
Turnovers	4	1
Time of possession	27:21	32:39

Team	Category	Player	Statistics
UAB	Passing	Dylan Hopkins	2/2, 63 yards, TD
UAB	Rushing	DeWayne McBride	24 rushes, 200 yards
UAB	Receiving	Samario Rudolph	1 reception, 59 yards, TD
Western Kentucky	Passing	Austin Reed	14/23, 128 yards
Western Kentucky	Rushing	L. T. Sanders	16 rushes, 120 yards
Western Kentucky	Receiving	Malachi Corley	5 receptions, 77 yards

=== At Florida Atlantic ===
	1	2	3	4	Total
Blazers	0	14	3	0	17
FAU Owls	10	0	14	0	24

Statistics	UAB	FAU
First downs	23	16
Total yards	472	359
Rushing yards	280	162
Passing yards	192	197
Turnovers	0	0
Time of possession	36:00	24:00

Team	Category	Player	Statistics
UAB	Passing	Jacob Zeno	18/32, 192 yards, TD
UAB	Rushing	DeWayne McBride	24 rushes, 168 yards, TD
UAB	Receiving	Trea Shropshire	2 receptions, 60 yards
Florida Atlantic	Passing	N'Kosi Perry	14/25, 197 yards, 3 TD
Florida Atlantic	Rushing	Zuberi Mobley	7 rushes, 57 yards
Florida Atlantic	Receiving	Je'Quan Burton	2 receptions, 55 yards, TD

=== UTSA ===
	1	2	3	4	OT	2OT	Total
Roadrunners	7	9	7	8	7	6	44
Blazers	0	10	7	14	7	0	38

Statistics	UTSA	UAB
First downs	26	26
Total yards	494	553
Rushing yards	209	221
Passing yards	285	332
Turnovers	0	1
Time of possession	28:33	31:27

Team	Category	Player	Statistics
UTSA	Passing	Frank Harris	22/31, 285 yards, 4 TD
UTSA	Rushing	Kevorian Barnes	16 rushes, 114 yards, TD
UTSA	Receiving	Zakhari Franklin	7 receptions, 93 yards, 2 TD
UAB	Passing	Jacob Zeno	27/38, 332 yards, 2 TD, INT
UAB	Rushing	DeWayne McBride	19 rushes, 141 yards, 2 TD
UAB	Receiving	Tejhaun Palmer	8 receptions, 110 yards, TD

=== North Texas ===
	1	2	3	4	Total
Mean Green	0	21	0	0	21
Blazers	14	3	10	14	41

Statistics	UNT	UAB
First downs	14	24
Total yards	264	505
Rushing yards	105	271
Passing yards	159	234
Turnovers	1	1
Time of possession	22:33	37:27

Team	Category	Player	Statistics
North Texas	Passing	Austin Aune	15/32, 159 yards, TD
North Texas	Rushing	Ikaika Ragsdale	17 rushes, 74 yards
North Texas	Receiving	Damon Ward Jr.	6 receptions, 58 yards, TD
UAB	Passing	Dylan Hopkins	15/23, 234 yards, TD
UAB	Rushing	Jermaine Brown Jr.	24 rushes, 150 yards, TD
UAB	Receiving	Tejhaun Palmer	1 reception, 75 yards

=== At LSU ===
UAB Blazers at No. 6 LSU Tigers – Game summary

Quarter	1	2	3	4	Total
Blazers	7	3	0	0	10
No. 6 Tigers	14	14	6	7	41

at Tiger Stadium, Baton Rouge, Louisiana

- Date: November 19
- Game time: 8:00 p.m. CST
- Game weather: Cloudy, 46 °F (8 °C)
- Game attendance: 97,367
- Referee: Jason Autrey
- TV announcers (ESPN2): Clay Matvick, Rocky Boiman and Dawn Davenport
- Box score, Recap

Game information

First quarter

- LSU – John Emery Jr. 2-yard run (Damian Ramos kick), 10:44. Tigers 7–0. Drive: 9 plays, 79 yards, 4:11.
- UAB – DeWayne McBride 5-yard run (Matt Quinn kick), 9:19. Tied 7–7. Drive: 3 plays, 30 yards, 1:12.
- LSU – Noah Cain 5-yard run (Damian Ramos kick), 5:59. Tigers 14–7. Drive: 8 plays, 75 yards, 3:20.

Second quarter

- UAB – Matt Quinn 29-yard field goal, 14:57. Tigers 14–10. Drive: 11 plays, 63 yards, 6:02.
- LSU – Noah Cain 1-yard run (Damian Ramos kick), 5:20. Tigers 21–10. Drive: 12 plays, 79 yards, 5:16.
- LSU – Noah Cain 1-yard run (Damian Ramos kick), 0:40. Tigers 28–10. Drive: 4 plays, 55 yards, 0:34.

Third quarter

- LSU – Jayden Daniels 2-yard run (kick failed), 6:50. Tigers 34–10. Drive: 6 plays, 57 yards, 2:46.

Fourth quarter

- LSU – Brian Thomas Jr. 5-yard pass from Jayden Daniels (Damian Ramos kick), 9:46. Tigers 41–10. Drive: 9 plays, 86 yards, 3:34.

Top passers

- UAB – Dylan Hopkins – 14/29, 158 yards
- LSU – Jayden Daniels – 22/29, 297 yards, TD

Top rushers

- UAB – DeWayne McBride – 13 rushes, 34 yards, TD
- LSU – Jayden Daniels – 12 rushes, 111 yards, TD

Top receivers

- UAB – Bryce Damous – 3 receptions, 56 yards
- LSU – Malik Nabers – 7 receptions, 129 yards

=== At Louisiana Tech ===
	1	2	3	4	Total
Blazers	0	17	20	0	37
Bulldogs	3	3	14	7	27

Statistics	UAB	LT
First downs	19	22
Total yards	497	467
Rushing yards	406	220
Passing yards	91	247
Turnovers	1	1
Time of possession	28:55	31:05

Team	Category	Player	Statistics
UAB	Passing	Dylan Hopkins	7/14, 91 yards, TD, INT
UAB	Rushing	DeWayne McBride	16 rushes, 272 yards, TD
UAB	Receiving	Trea Shropshire	1 reception, 74 yards, TD
Louisiana Tech	Passing	Jack Turner	15/25, 167 yards, TD, INT
Louisiana Tech	Rushing	Charvis Thornton	8 rushes, 132 yards, TD
Louisiana Tech	Receiving	Tre Harris	6 receptions, 63 yards, TD

=== Miami (OH) (Bahamas Bowl) ===
Miami (OH) RedHawks vs. UAB Blazers (2022 HomeTown Lenders Bahamas Bowl) – Game summary

Quarter	1	2	3	4	Total
Miami	0	6	7	7	20
UAB	10	0	0	14	24

at Thomas Robinson Stadium • Nassau, Bahamas

- Date: December 16, 2022
- Game time: 11:35 a.m. EST
- Game weather: Sunny • Temperature: 81 °F (27 °C) • Wind: 12 mph (19 km/h) north
- Game attendance: 12,172
- Referee: Tim Davis
- TV announcers (ESPN): Steve Levy (play-by-play), Joey Galloway (analyst), and Kris Budden (sideline)
- Box score

Scoring summary

Quarter	Time	Drive			Team	Scoring information	Score	
Quarter	Time	Plays	Yards	TOP	Team	Scoring information	Miami	UAB
1	9:22	5	68	2:16	UAB	Trea Shropshire 10-yard touchdown reception from Dylan Hopkins, Matt Quinn kick good	0	7
1	3:31	10	45	4:52	UAB	42-yard field goal by Matt Quinn	0	10
2	0:34	11	65	3:30	Miami	Mac Hippenhammer 33-yard touchdown reception from Aveon Smith, Graham Nicholson kick failed (blocked)	6	10
3	5:44	1	4	0:06	Miami	Kevin Davis 4-yard touchdown run, Graham Nicholson kick good	13	10
4	13:29	14	75	7:15	UAB	Jermaine Brown Jr. 3-yard touchdown run, Matt Quinn kick good	13	17
4	6:52	12	75	6:37	Miami	Kenny Tracy 10-yard touchdown reception from Aveon Smith, Graham Nicholson kick good	20	17
4	1:33	5	70	2:43	UAB	Jermaine Brown Jr. 12-yard touchdown run, Matt Quinn kick good	20	24
"TOP" = time of possession. For other American football terms, see Glossary of American football.							20	24

Statistics	MIA	UAB
First downs	20	24
Total yards	272	390
Rushing yards	110	138
Passing yards	162	252
Turnovers	0	3
Time of possession	26:40	33:20

Team	Category	Player	Statistics
Miami (OH)	Passing	Aveon Smith	15/27, 162 yards, 2 TD
Miami (OH)	Rushing	Aveon Smith	22 rushes, 50 yards
Miami (OH)	Receiving	Kevin Davis	3 receptions, 39 yards
UAB	Passing	Dylan Hopkins	16/24, 204 yards, TD, INT
UAB	Rushing	Jermaine Brown Jr.	24 rushes, 116 yards, 2 TD
UAB	Receiving	Trea Shropshire	6 receptions, 183 yards, TD
