= Brian Baker =

Brian Baker may refer to:

- Brian Baker (actor) (born 1967), American actor and former Sprint spokesman
- Brian Baker (American football) (born 1962), American football coach and former player
- Brian Baker (musician) (born 1965), American guitarist for punk bands Minor Threat, Dag Nasty, and Bad Religion, among others
- Brian Baker (tennis) (born 1985), American professional tennis player
- Brian Baker (politician) (1973–2021), American politician and Missouri State Representative
- Brian Baker (runner) (born 1970), American track and field athlete and coach
- Brian Edmund Baker (1896–1979), British World War I flying ace
- Brian Baker (producer), American engineer and producer for bands including Blue October
- Brian Baker (The Wire), a fictional police officer on the HBO drama The Wire
- Brian Baker, Australian singer for The Makers and others
- Brian Baker, founder of the Riverview Church in Western Australia

== See also ==
- Bryan Baker (disambiguation)
