= 2022 Western Kentucky Hilltoppers football team =

American college football season

2022 Western Kentucky Hilltoppers football

New Orleans Bowl champion

New Orleans Bowl, W 44–23 vs. South Alabama
- Conference: Conference USA
- Record: 9–5 (6–2 C-USA)
- Head coach: Tyson Helton (4th season)
- Co-offensive coordinators: Ben Arbuckle (1st season); Josh Crawford (1st season)
- Offensive scheme: Air raid
- Defensive coordinator: Tyson Summers (1st season)
- Base defense: 3–3–5
- Home stadium: Houchens Industries–L. T. Smith Stadium

2022 Conference USA football standings
	Conf.			Overall
Team	W		L	W		L
UTSA y$	8	–	0	11	–	3
Western Kentucky	6	–	2	9	–	5
North Texas y	6	–	2	7	–	7
Middle Tennessee	4	–	4	8	–	5
UAB	4	–	4	7	–	6
Florida Atlantic	4	–	4	5	–	7
Rice	3	–	5	5	–	8
UTEP	3	–	5	5	–	7
FIU	2	–	6	4	–	8
Charlotte	2	–	6	3	–	9
Louisiana Tech	2	–	6	3	–	9
Championship: UTSA 48, North Texas 27
$ – Conference champion; y – Championship game participant; Rankings from AP Poll

The 2022 Western Kentucky Hilltoppers football team represented Western Kentucky University as a member of Conference USA (C-USA) during the 2022 NCAA Division I FBS football season. They were led by head coach Tyson Helton, who was coaching his fourth season with the team. The Hilltoppers played their home games at Houchens Industries–L. T. Smith Stadium in Bowling Green, Kentucky.

The team was led on offense by quarterback Austin Reed who joined the team in 2022 via the NCAA transfer portal. Through the first two games, Reed had 550 passing yards, ranking third in the nation.

== Preseason ==
=== C-USA media day ===
The Conference USA media day was held on July 27 at Globe Life Field in Arlington, Texas. The Hilltoppers were represented by head coach Tyson Helton, tight end Joey Beljan, and defensive end Juwuan Jones. The Hilltoppers were predicted to finish third in the conference's preseason poll.

== Roster ==
2022 Western Kentucky Hilltoppers football team roster
Players
Coaches
Offense

Pos.	#	Name	Class
WR	0	Jaylen Hall	GS
WR	1	Craig Burt Jr.	Sr
RB	3	Jakairi Moses	Jr
WR	4	Michael Mathison	Jr
WR	5	Dakota Thomas	So
TE	6	Joshua Simon	So
WR	7	Daewood Davis	Sr
RB	8	Kye Robichaux	So
WR	9	Josh Sterns	So
QB	10	Caden Veltkamp	Fr
WR	11	Malachi Corley	So
QB	12	Turner Helton	Fr
QB	13	Darius Ocean	Fr
WR	15	K. D. Hutchinson	Fr
QB	16	Austin Reed	GS
WR	17	Dalvin Smith	So
WR	18	Denzil Alleyne	So
RB	19	Javy Bunton	Fr
RB	21	L. T. Sanders	Fr
RB	22	Davion Ervin-Poindexter	Jr
WR	23	Kendall Abdur-Rahman	So
RB	37	Zavione Wood	Fr
OL	50	Wesley Horton	Fr
OL	51	Luke Slusher	Fr
OL	52	Marshall Jackson	Fr
OL	53	Rusty Staats	Jr
OL	58	Evan Wibberley	Fr
OL	64	Vincent Murphy	So
OL	67	Hayden Todd	Fr
OL	68	Colt Jackson	So
OL	71	Wyatt Anderson	Fr
OL	72	Colten Cable	Jr
OL	73	Wes Dorsey	So
OL	74	Michael Ondelacy	So
OL	75	Gunner Britton	Jr
OL	76	Mark Goode	So
OL	77	David Ndukwe	So
OL	78	Quantavious Lesue	So
OL	79	Cameron Stage	Jr
WR	80	Easton Messer	Fr
TE	81	Dane Saltarelli	Jr
WR	82	Jax Cooper	Fr
TE	83	Alex Williams	Fr
WR	85	Tomi Mustapha	Fr
WR	86	TeeJay Taylor	So
TE	87	River Helms	Fr
TE	89	Joey Beljan	Jr

Defense

Pos.	#	Name	Class
DT	0	Lorenzo Hernandez	GS
LB	1	Jaden Hunter	Sr
DB	2	A. J. Brathwaite Jr.	Jr
LB	3	Jaques Evans	So
LB	4	Niko Cooper	Jr
DB	5	Rome Weber	Jr
DB	6	T. J. Springer	So
DB	7	Tre Shaw	Sr
LB	8	Matthew Flint	Jr
DB	9	Dominique Bradshaw	Sr
LB	10	Desmyn Baker	Jr
DB	11	Talique Allen	Fr
DB	12	Kahlef Hailassie	Jr
DT	13	Terrion Thompson	So
DB	14	Davion Williams	Jr
LB	15	Aaron Key	Fr
DB	16	Kendrick Simpkins	So
DB	17	Travis Collier	Fr
DB	18	C. J. Jones	Sr
DB	19	Virgil Marshall	Fr
DB	20	Kaleb Oliver	Sr
DB	21	Upton Stout	Fr
DB	22	Darius Thomas	Fr
LB	23	Will Ignont	Sr
LB	24	Derrick Smith	Sr
LB	25	Bryson Washington	Jr
DB	26	Amaari Smith	Fr
DB	27	Kiwon Harris	Jr
LB	28	Ely George	So
LB	29	Dezmion Roberson	Fr
DB	30	Xavier Shaw	Fr
DB	31	Anthony Brackenridge	Fr
LB	32	Kylan Guidry	So
LB	33	Eli Jones	Fr
DE	34	Juwuan Jones	Sr
DT	35	Mike Allen	Sr
DB	37	Maximus Pulley	Fr
LB	38	A. J. Yasilli	Fr
DB	40	B. J. Wagner	Fr
DB	41	Alex Ford	Fr
LB	42	Trent Zappe	Fr
DB	43	Manny Moss	Fr
DT	44	Dareon Goodrum	Jr
LB	45	Nathan Griffin	So
LB	50	Luke Burton	Fr
DE	55	Dante Walker	So
DE	88	Jake Jackson	Fr
DT	90	Keaton Law	Fr
DT	91	Chase Jones	Fr
DE	92	Marcus Patterson	Fr
DE	93	Reid Jamerson	Fr
DE	95	Deante McCray	Fr
DT	97	Darius Shipp	Sr
DT	98	Hosea Wheeler	So
DT	99	Brodric Martin	Sr

Special teams

Pos.	#	Name	Class
K	20	Lucas Carneiro	Fr
LS	40	Zach Lassiter	Sr
K	44	Brayden Narveson	Jr
K	46	Cory Munson	Jr
P	47	Tom Ellard	Fr
K	49	Nolan McCord	Fr
LS	52	Trey Naughton	Fr
LS	59	Jake Bowman	So
P	94	Wes Pahl	Fr

Head coach

- Tyson Helton

Coordinators/assistant coaches

- Ben Arbuckle (Co-Offensive coordinator / quarterbacks)
- Josh Crawford (co-offensive coordinator / Wide receivers)
- Zach Lankford (co-offensive coordinator / Offensive line)
- Tyson Summers (Defensive coordinator)
- Andy Larussa (special teams coordinator / tight ends)
- Kenny Baker (defensive line)
- Enrique Davis (running backs)
- Keynodo Hudson (defensive backs)
- Michael Hutchings (outside linebackers)
- Travis Cunningham (Middle linebackers)

Legend

- (C) Team captain
- (S) Suspended
- (I) Ineligible
- Injured
- Redshirt

Roster
Last update: August 23, 2022

== Schedule ==
Western Kentucky and Conference USA announced the 2022 football schedule on March 30, 2022.

Date	Time	Opponent	Site	TV	Result	Attendance
August 27	11:00 a.m.	Austin Peay*	Houchens Industries–L. T. Smith Stadium; Bowling Green, KY	CBSSN	W 38–27	13,688
September 3	11:00 p.m.	at Hawaii*	Clarence T. C. Ching Athletics Complex; Honolulu, HI	SPEC PPV	W 49–17	9,346
September 17	11:00 a.m.	at Indiana*	Memorial Stadium; Bloomington, IN	BTN	L 30–33 ^{OT}	48,952
September 24	2:30 p.m.	FIU	Houchens Industries–L. T. Smith Stadium; Bowling Green, KY	CBSSN	W 73–0	15,127
October 1	6:00 p.m.	Troy*	Houchens Industries–L. T. Smith Stadium; Bowling Green, KY	ESPN+	L 27–34	20,168
October 8	5:00 p.m.	at UTSA	Alamodome; San Antonio, TX	ESPN+	L 28–31	22,328
October 15	2:30 p.m.	at Middle Tennessee	Johnny "Red" Floyd Stadium; Murfreesboro, TN (100 Miles of Hate)	ESPN+	W 35–17	14,806
October 21	7:00 p.m.	UAB	Houchens Industries–L. T. Smith Stadium; Bowling Green, KY	CBSSN	W 20–17	16,334
October 29	2:30 p.m.	North Texas	Houchens Industries–L. T. Smith Stadium; Bowling Green, KY	Stadium	L 13–40	17,194
November 5	11:00 a.m.	at Charlotte	Jerry Richardson Stadium; Charlotte, NC	CBSSN	W 59–7	10,857
November 12	1:00 p.m.	Rice	Houchens Industries–L. T. Smith Stadium; Bowling Green, KY	ESPN+	W 45–10	10,127
November 19	3:00 p.m.	at Auburn*	Jordan–Hare Stadium; Auburn, AL	SECN	L 17–41	81,824
November 26	11:00 a.m.	at Florida Atlantic	FAU Stadium; Boca Raton, FL	CBSSN	W 32–31 ^{OT}	18,376
December 21	8:00 p.m.	vs. South Alabama*	Caesars Superdome; New Orleans, LA (New Orleans Bowl)	ESPN	W 44–23	13,456
*Non-conference game; All times are in Central time

== Game summaries ==
=== Austin Peay ===
	1	2	3	4	Total
Governors	10	7	3	7	27
Hilltoppers	7	14	0	17	38

Statistics	APSU	WKU
First downs	19	19
Total yards	319	388
Rushing yards	163	108
Passing yards	156	280
Turnovers	4	1
Time of possession	32:39	27:31

Team	Category	Player	Statistics
Austin Peay	Passing	Mike DiLiello	15/21, 156 yards, 2 TD, 2 INT
Austin Peay	Rushing	Josh Samuel	20 rushes, 77 yards
Austin Peay	Receiving	Drae McCray	6 receptions, 90 yards, 2 TD
Western Kentucky	Passing	Austin Reed	20/34, 280 yards, 4 TD, INT
Western Kentucky	Rushing	Davion Ervin-Poindexter	15 rushes, 49 yards
Western Kentucky	Receiving	Daewood Davis	6 receptions, 124 yards, TD

=== At Hawaii ===
	1	2	3	4	Total
Hilltoppers	0	21	7	21	49
Rainbow Warriors	3	7	0	7	17

Statistics	WKU	HAW
First downs	24	20
Total yards	412	360
Rushing yards	141	94
Passing yards	271	266
Turnovers	2	6
Time of possession	25:52	34:08

Team	Category	Player	Statistics
Western Kentucky	Passing	Austin Reed	22/31, 271 yards, 3 TD, INT
Western Kentucky	Rushing	Kye Robichaux	7 rushes, 49 yards, TD
Western Kentucky	Receiving	Daewood Davis	5 receptions, 78 yards
Hawaii	Passing	Brayden Schager	22/33, 230 yards, 4 INT
Hawaii	Rushing	Nasjzae Bryant-Lelei	13 rushes, 64 yards, TD
Hawaii	Receiving	Jalen Walthall	3 receptions, 53 yards

=== At Indiana ===
	1	2	3	4	OT	Total
Hilltoppers	7	10	7	6	0	30
Hoosiers	3	7	3	17	3	33

Statistics	WKU	IU
First downs	25	28
Total yards	545	484
Rushing yards	216	120
Passing yards	329	364
Turnovers	2	1
Time of possession	32:21	27:39

Team	Category	Player	Statistics
Western Kentucky	Passing	Austin Reed	33/43, 329 yards, 2 TD, INT
Western Kentucky	Rushing	Kye Robichaux	14 rushes, 135 yards
Western Kentucky	Receiving	Daewood Davis	5 receptions, 77 yards, TD
Indiana	Passing	Connor Bazelak	33/55, 364 yards, 2 TD
Indiana	Rushing	Josh Henderson	11 rushes, 65 yards, TD
Indiana	Receiving	Cam Camper	8 receptions, 93 yards, TD

=== FIU ===
	1	2	3	4	Total
Panthers	0	0	0	0	0
Hilltoppers	14	28	17	14	73

Statistics	FIU	WKU
First downs	10	32
Total yards	180	688
Rushing yards	56	210
Passing yards	124	478
Turnovers	2	1
Time of possession	30:32	29:28

Team	Category	Player	Statistics
FIU	Passing	Grayson James	13/23, 85 yards
FIU	Rushing	Lexington Joseph	15 rushes, 31 yards
FIU	Receiving	Nate Jefferson	4 receptions, 27 yards
Western Kentucky	Passing	Austin Reed	29/35, 381 yards, 5 TD
Western Kentucky	Rushing	L. T. Sanders	4 rushes, 73 yards, TD
Western Kentucky	Receiving	Malachi Corley	3 receptions, 125 yards, 2 TD

=== Troy ===
	1	2	3	4	Total
Trojans	10	3	7	14	34
Hilltoppers	7	10	3	7	27

=== At UTSA ===
	1	2	3	4	Total
Hilltoppers	7	7	0	14	28
Roadrunners	7	10	7	7	31

=== At Middle Tennessee ===
	1	2	3	4	Total
Hilltoppers	0	14	14	7	35
Blue Raiders	7	3	0	7	17

=== UAB ===
	1	2	3	4	Total
Blazers	7	10	0	0	17
Hilltoppers	0	10	10	0	20

Statistics	UAB	WKU
First downs	14	19
Total yards	327	352
Rushing yards	231	224
Passing yards	96	128
Turnovers	4	1
Time of possession	27:21	32:39

Team	Category	Player	Statistics
UAB	Passing	Dylan Hopkins	2/2, 63 yards, TD
UAB	Rushing	DeWayne McBride	24 rushes, 200 yards
UAB	Receiving	Samario Rudolph	1 reception, 59 yards, TD
Western Kentucky	Passing	Austin Reed	14/23, 128 yards
Western Kentucky	Rushing	L. T. Sanders	16 rushes, 120 yards
Western Kentucky	Receiving	Malachi Corley	5 receptions, 77 yards

=== North Texas ===
	1	2	3	4	Total
Mean Green	17	3	0	20	40
Hilltoppers	7	6	0	0	13

Statistics	UNT	WKU
First downs	25	23
Total yards	541	466
Rushing yards	196	146
Passing yards	345	320
Turnovers	0	2
Time of possession	29:05	30:55

Team	Category	Player	Statistics
North Texas	Passing	Austin Aune	20/28, 322 yards, 3 TD
North Texas	Rushing	Ayo Adeyi	10 rushes, 72 yards, TD
North Texas	Receiving	Damon Ward Jr.	4 receptions, 101 yards, TD
Western Kentucky	Passing	Austin Reed	29/49, 320 yards, TD, INT
Western Kentucky	Rushing	L. T. Sanders	13 rushes, 76 yards
Western Kentucky	Receiving	Malachi Corley	8 receptions, 97 yards

=== At Charlotte ===
Western Kentucky vs Charlotte

Team	1	2	3	4	Total
• Hilltoppers	21	14	7	17	59
49ers	0	0	7	0	7

- Date: November 5
- Location: Jerry Richardson Stadium
  Charlotte, NC
- Game start: 12:02 pm EDT
- Elapsed time: 3:17
- Game attendance: 10,857
- Game weather: 72 °F (22 °C) • Weather: Cloudy• Wind: S 9 MPH
- Referee: Rodney Burnett
- TV announcers (CBSSN): Carter Blackburn, Robert Turbin

Scoring summary
1	14:32	WKU	Jaylen HALL 46 Yd pass from Austin REED (Brayden NARVESON Kick)	WKU 7–0
1	11:55	WKU	Daewood DAVIS 7 Yd pass from Austin REED (Brayden NARVESON Kick)	WKU 14–0
1	6:52	WKU	Malachi CORLEY 64 Yd pass from Austin REED (Brayden NARVESON Kick)	WKU 21–0
2	13:00	WKU	Joshua SIMON 17 Yd pass from Austin REED (Brayden NARVESON Kick)	WKU 28–0
2	1:02	WKU	Joey BELJAN 14 Yd pass from Austin REED (Brayden NARVESON Kick)	WKU 35–0
3	10:32	CHAR	Elijah SPENCER 14 Yd pass from Chris REYNOLDS (Antonio ZITA Kick)	WKU 35–7
3	9:58	WKU	Michael MATHISON 19 Yd pass from Austin REED (Brayden NARVESON Kick)	WKU 42–7
4	9:06	WKU	Brayden NARVESON 40 Yd Field Goal	WKU 45–7
4	7:50	WKU	Anthony BRACKENRIDGE 42 Yd Interception Return (Brayden NARVESON Kick)	WKU 52–7
4	0:45	WKU	Dalvin SMITH 5 Yd pass from Darius OCEAN (Brayden NARVESON Kick)	WKU 59–7

Statistics	WKU	CHAR
First downs	25	22
Total yards	592	384
Rushing yards	131	161
Passing yards	461	223
Turnovers	0	3
Time of possession	20:26	39:34

Team	Category	Player	Statistics
Western Kentucky	Passing	Austin Reed	23–38, 409 yards, 6 TD
Western Kentucky	Rushing	Davion Ervin-Poindexter	3 rushes, 49 yards
Western Kentucky	Receiving	Malachi Corley	6 receptions, 162 yards, 1 TD
Charlotte	Passing	Chris Reynolds	17–27, 196 yards, 1 TD, 1 INT
Charlotte	Rushing	James Martin III	16 rushes, 85 yards
Charlotte	Receiving	Grant DuBose	7 receptions, 88 yards

=== Rice ===
	1	2	3	4	Total
Hilltoppers	7	17	7	14	45
Owls	0	7	3	0	10

=== At Auburn ===
Game Twelve – Western Kentucky Hilltoppers (7−4) at Auburn Tigers (4−6)

Quarter	1	2	3	4	Total
Hilltoppers	0	17	0	0	17
Tigers	10	7	10	14	41

at Jordan–Hare Stadium • Auburn, Alabama

- Date: Saturday, November 19, 2022
- Game time: 3:01 p.m. CST
- Game weather: Cloudy • Temperature: 55 °F (13 °C) • Wind: 6 mph NW
- Game attendance: 81,824
- Referee: Scott Walker
- TV announcers (SEC Network): Dave Neal (play-by-play), Deuce McAllister (analyst), Andraya Carter (sideline reporter)

Statistics	WKU	AUB
First downs		
Plays–yards		
Rushes–yards		
Passing yards		
Passing: comp–att–int		
Turnovers		
Time of possession		

Team	Category	Player	Statistics
Western Kentucky	Passing	Austin Reed	26/55, 289 yards, 2 TD, 2 INT
Western Kentucky	Rushing	Markese Stepp	7 carries, 33 yards
Western Kentucky	Receiving	Malachi Corley	12 receptions, 99 yards
Auburn	Passing	Jarquez Hunter	1/1, 20 yards, 1 TD
Auburn	Rushing	Tank Bigsby	18 carries, 110 yards, 2 TD
Auburn	Receiving	Koy Moore	2 receptions, 31 yards, 1 TD

Scoring summary

Quarter	Time	Drive			Team	Scoring information	Score	
Quarter	Time	Plays	Yards	TOP	Team	Scoring information	Western Kentucky	Auburn
"TOP" = time of possession. For other American football terms, see Glossary of American football.								

=== At Florida Atlantic ===
	1	2	3	4	OT	Total
Owls	0	7	10	7	7	31
Hilltoppers	0	7	10	7	8	32

=== South Alabama (New Orleans Bowl) ===
	1	2	3	4	Total
Hilltoppers	14	17	10	3	44
Jaguars	0	3	14	6	23
