= 2022 UTSA Roadrunners football team =

American college football season

2022 UTSA Roadrunners football

C-USA champion

C-USA Championship Game, W 48–27 vs. North Texas

Cure Bowl, L 12–18 vs. Troy
- Conference: Conference USA
- Record: 11–3 (8–0 C-USA)
- Head coach: Jeff Traylor (3rd season)
- Co-offensive coordinators: Matt Mattox (1st season); Will Stein (1st season)
- Offensive scheme: Spread
- Defensive coordinator: Jess Loepp (2nd season)
- Base defense: 3–4
- Home stadium: Alamodome

2022 Conference USA football standings
	Conf.			Overall
Team	W		L	W		L
UTSA y$	8	–	0	11	–	3
Western Kentucky	6	–	2	9	–	5
North Texas y	6	–	2	7	–	7
Middle Tennessee	4	–	4	8	–	5
UAB	4	–	4	7	–	6
Florida Atlantic	4	–	4	5	–	7
Rice	3	–	5	5	–	8
UTEP	3	–	5	5	–	7
FIU	2	–	6	4	–	8
Charlotte	2	–	6	3	–	9
Louisiana Tech	2	–	6	3	–	9
Championship: UTSA 48, North Texas 27
$ – Conference champion; y – Championship game participant; Rankings from AP Poll

The 2022 UTSA Roadrunners football team represented the University of Texas at San Antonio as a member of Conference USA (C-USA) during the 2022 NCAA Division I FBS football season. They were led by head coach Jeff Traylor, who was coaching his third season with the team. The Roadrunners played their home games at the Alamodome in San Antonio.

During the previous season, on October 21, 2021, UTSA accepted an invitation to join the American Athletic Conference (The American) and will become a full member on July 1, 2023. The 2022 season is thus the program's last as a member of C-USA. Prior to the 2022 season, Conference USA shrank to 11 schools, as previous members Marshall, Old Dominion, and Southern Miss all departed to join (and in Old Dominion's case, rejoin) the Sun Belt Conference as full members. Thus the conference disbanded the divisions and played in a single league table.

The Roadrunners began their season with a thrilling triple-overtime contest against No. 24 Houston, ultimately coming up two points short. Another overtime game followed, with UTSA defeating Army to earn their first win. The Roadrunners split their following two games, with a loss at No. 21 Texas and a victory over FCS Texas Southern at home. Their nonconference schedule complete, the Roadrunners began their C–USA slate with a road clash against Middle Tennessee, a fifteen-point win. A three-point win against Western Kentucky and a twenty-point win at FIU followed, leading UTSA into their homecoming contest against the North Texas Mean Green. The Roadrunners were victorious by a margin of four points, earning them their sixth win and bowl eligibility as a result. Following a bye week, the Roadrunners began November with another overtime game—their third of the season—as they took down UAB in double overtime. Dominant wins over Louisiana Tech and C-USA regular-season title vs Rice followed, and UTSA closed out their regular season at home with a three-point victory over the UTEP Miners, after overcoming a 24-point deficit they faced in the game's second quarter. The Roadrunners finished the regular season on a nine-game win streak, dating to September 24, and won the Conference USA regular season championship and a bid to the conference title game the following week. There, they defeated North Texas in a rematch by three touchdowns, earning the program's second overall and consecutive conference championship. UTSA finished the season with a record of 11–2 and a perfect 8–0 mark in conference play, and were ranked No. 22 in both the AP Poll and Coaches Poll. They finished No. 25 in the College Football Playoff rankings. They lost to Troy in the 2022 Cure Bowl, 18–12.

== Preseason conference player awards ==
Preseason player awards were announced on July 26.

- Offensive Player of the Year: Frank Harris ( (redshirt) Senior, quarterback)
- Defensive Player of the Year: Rashad Wisdom (Senior, safety)

== C-USA media day ==
The Conference USA media day was held on July 27 at Globe Life Field in Arlington, Texas. The Roadrunners were predicted to finish first in the conference's preseason poll.

== Schedule ==
UTSA and Conference USA announced the 2022 football schedule on March 30, 2022.

Date	Time	Opponent	Rank	Site	TV	Result	Attendance
September 3	2:30 p.m.	No. 24 Houston*		Alamodome; San Antonio, TX	CBSSN	L 35–37 ^{3OT}	37,526
September 10	11:00 a.m.	at Army*		Michie Stadium; West Point, NY	CBSSN	W 41–38 ^{OT}	23,551
September 17	7:00 p.m.	at No. 21 Texas*		Darrell K Royal–Texas Memorial Stadium; Austin, TX	LHN	L 20–41	102,520 (Note: Largest crowd to date that UTSA has played in front of, 4th largest crowd at Texas' Darrell K Royal–Texas Memorial Stadium)
September 24	2:30 p.m.	Texas Southern*		Alamodome; San Antonio, TX	Stadium	W 52–24	22,562
September 30	6:30 p.m.	at Middle Tennessee		Johnny "Red" Floyd Stadium; Murfreesboro, TN	CBSSN	W 45–30	15,020
October 8	5:00 p.m.	Western Kentucky		Alamodome; San Antonio, TX	ESPN+	W 31–28	22,328
October 14	7:00 p.m.	at FIU		Riccardo Silva Stadium; Westchester, FL	CBSSN	W 30–10	14,122
October 22	2:30 p.m.	North Texas^{†}		Alamodome; San Antonio, TX	Stadium	W 31–27	27,122
November 5	2:30 p.m.	at UAB		Protective Stadium; Birmingham, AL	Stadium	W 44–38 ^{2OT}	17,205
November 12	2:30 p.m.	Louisiana Tech		Alamodome; San Antonio, TX	ESPN+	W 51–7	25,409
November 19	12:00 p.m.	at Rice		Rice Stadium; Houston, TX	ESPN+	W 41–7	18,249
November 26	2:30 p.m.	UTEP		Alamodome; San Antonio, TX	Stadium	W 34–31	26,061
December 2	6:30 p.m.	North Texas		Alamodome; San Antonio, TX (C-USA Championship)	CBSSN	W 48–27	41,412
December 16	2:00 p.m.	vs. No. 24 Troy*	No. 25	Exploria Stadium; Orlando, FL (Cure Bowl)	ESPN	L 12–18	11,911
*Non-conference game; ^{†}Homecoming; Rankings from AP Poll (and CFP Rankings, after November 1) - Released prior to game; All times are in Central time

== Game summaries ==
=== No. 24 Houston ===
Houston at UTSA

Team	1	2	3	4	OT	2OT	3OT	Total
• No. 24 Cougars	0	7	0	17	3	8	2	37
Roadrunners	0	14	7	3	3	8	0	35

- Date: September 3, 2022
- Location: Alamodome (San Antonio, TX)
- Game start: 2:37 p.m. CDT
- Elapsed time: 4 hours and 8 minutes
- Game attendance: 37,526
- Game weather: 74 °F (23 °C) • Weather: Indoor
- Referee: Hank Johns
- TV announcers (CBSSN): Rich Waltz (play-by-play), Aaron Taylor (analyst), and Sherree Burruss (sideline)

Scoring summary
2	14:02	HOU	Tank Dell 11-yard pass from Clayton Tune (Bubba Baxa Kick) (11 plays, 58 yards, 5:17)	HOU 7–0
2	12:20	UTSA	Joshua Cephus 51-yard pass from Frank Harris (Jared Sackett Kick) (4 plays, 65 yards, 1:42)	TIE 7–7
2	6:30	UTSA	Frank Harris 38-yard run (Jared Sackett Kick) (9 plays, 80 yards, 2:51)	UTSA 14–7
3	4:12	UTSA	De'Corian Clark 15-yard pass from Frank Harris (Jared Sackett Kick) (10 plays, 73 yards, 3:12)	UTSA 21–7
4	14:54	HOU	Tank Dell 10-yard pass from Clayton Tune (Bubba Baxa Kick) (9 plays, 75 yards, 4:18)	UTSA 21–14
4	12:19	HOU	Joseph Manjack IV 20-yard pass from Clayton Tune (Bubba Baxa Kick) (1 play, 20 yards, 0:07)	TIE 21–21
4	0:23	HOU	Bubba Baxa 35-yard field goal (18 plays, 77 yards, 10:30)	HOU 24–21
4	0:00	UTSA	Jared Sackett 37-yard field goal (6 plays, 55 yards, 0:23)	TIE 24–24
OT		HOU	Bubba Baxa 35-yard field goal (4 plays, 7 yards)	HOU 27–24
OT		UTSA	Jared Sackett 39-yard field goal (4 plays, 3 yards)	TIE 27–27
2OT		HOU	Clayton Tune 1-yard run (Clayton Tune pass to Tank Dell for two-point conversion) (9 plays, 25 yards)	HOU 35–27
2OT		UTSA	De'Corian Clark 13-yard pass from Frank Harris (Frank Harris run for two-point conversion) (5 plays, 25 yards)	TIE 35–35
3OT		HOU	Clayton Tune run for two-point conversion (1 play, 8 yards)	HOU 37–35

Statistics	Houston	UTSA
First downs	20	24
Plays–yards	76–346	73–441
Rushes–yards	44–140	28–104
Passing yards	206	337
Passing: Comp–Att–Int	22–32–0	28–43–1
Time of possession	35:27	24:33

Team	Category	Player	Statistics
Houston	Passing	Clayton Tune	22/32, 206 yards, 3 TDs
Houston	Rushing	Clayton Tune	15 carries, 51 yards, 1 TD
Houston	Receiving	Tank Dell	5 receptions, 50 yards, 2 TDs
UTSA	Passing	Frank Harris	28/43, 337 yards, 3 TDs, 1 INT
UTSA	Rushing	Frank Harris	8 carries, 63 yards, 1 TD
UTSA	Receiving	Joshua Cephus	7 receptions, 106 yards, 1 TD

=== At Army ===
UTSA Roadrunners at Army Black Knights

Quarter	1	2	3	4	OT	Total
Roadrunners	0	14	7	14	6	41
Black Knights	7	14	7	7	3	38

at Michie Stadium, West Point, NY

- Date: September 10, 2022
- Game time: 12:00 p.m. EDT
- Game weather: Temperature: 77 °F (25 °C) • Wind: SW 5 mph • Weather: Sunny
- Game attendance: 23,551
- Referee: Art Brown
- TV announcers (CBSSN): Jason Knapp (play-by-play), Ross Tucker (analyst) & Tina Cervasio (sideline)
- ESPN – Harris rallies UTSA over Army in overtime, 41–38 /// Box Score, UTSA at Army /// Army Pregame Notes /// UTSA Pregame Notes /// Postgame Notes

Game information

First quarter

- (05:24) ARMY TD – Ay'Jaun Marshall 77-yard pass from Tyhier Tyler, Quinn Maretzki kick
  Drive: 1 play, 77 yards, 0:11; Army 7–0

Second quarter

- (07:58) UTSA TD – Trelon Smith 1-yard rush, Jared Sackett kick
  Drive: 1 play, 1 yard, 0:05; Tied 7–7
- (04:45) ARMY TD – Jakobi Buchanan 1-yard rush, Quinn Maretzki kick
  Drive: 7 plays, 75 yards, 3:13; Army 14–7
- (01:29) UTSA TD – Zakhari Franklin 29-yard pass from Frank Harris, Jared Sackett kick
  Drive: 10 plays, 75 yards, 3:16; Tied 14–14
- (00:03) ARMY TD – Jakobi Buchanan 1-yard rush, Quinn Maretzki kick
  Drive: 9 plays, 75 yards, 1:26; Army 21–14

Third quarter

- (06:49) ARMY TD – Tyhier Tyler 16-yard rush, Quinn Maretzki kick
  Drive: 12 plays, 75 yards, 8:11; Army 28–14
- (02:02) UTSA TD – Zakhari Franklin 9-yard pass from Frank Harris, Jared Sackett kick
  Drive: 13 plays, 84 yards, 4:42; Army 28–21

Fourth quarter

- (09:49) UTSA TD – Brenden Brady 1-yard rush, Jared Sackett kick
  Drive: 11 plays, 74 yards, 4:55; Tied 28–28
- (07:11) UTSA TD – Brenden Brady 1-yard rush, Jared Sackett kick
  Drive: 4 plays, 54 yards, 1:12; UTSA 35–28
- (01:03) ARMY TD – Tyrell Robinson 42-yard pass from Cade Ballard, Quinn Maretzki kick
  Drive: 10 plays, 75 yards, 6:08; Tied 35–35

Overtime

- (00:00) ARMY FG – Quinn Maretzki 28-yard field goal
  Drive: 10 plays, 14 yards, 0:00; Army 38–35
- (00:00) UTSA TD – De'Corian Clark 7-yard pass from Frank Harris
  Drive: 2 plays, 25 yards, 0:00; UTSA 41–38

Passing

- UTSA – Frank Harris: 32/45, 359 yards, 3 TD
- ARMY – Cade Ballard: 11/15, 221 yards, 1 TD

Rushing

- UTSA – Brenden Brady: 19 carries, 76 yards, 2 TD
- ARMY – Tyhier Tyler: 9 carries, 61 yards, 1 TD

Receiving

- UTSA – Zakhari Franklin: 10 receptions, 122 yards, 2 TD
- ARMY – Ay'Jaun Marshall: 3 receptions, 87 yards, 1 TD

Defense

- UTSA – Clifford Chattman: 11 total tackles (7 solo, 4 assisted), 1 quarterback hurry
- ARMY – Marquel Broughton: 9 total tackles (6 solo, 3 assisted), 3 pass break-ups

Statistics	UTSA	ARMY
First downs	30	22
3rd down efficiency	11–15	7–16
4th down efficiency	0–1	3–4
Plays–yards	81–512	72–483
Rushes–yards	36–153	54–179
Passing yards	359	304
Passing: Comp–Att–Int	32–45–0	13–18–0
Penalties–yards	10–70	7–68
Turnovers	0	2
Time of possession	27:53	32:07

=== At No. 20 Texas ===
Team	1	2	3	4	Total
UTSA	3	14	3	0	20
• No. 21 Texas	0	17	14	10	41

- Date: September 17
- Location: Darrell K Royal–Texas Memorial Stadium (Austin, TX)
- Game start: 7:00 p.m.
- Game attendance: 102,520
- Game weather: Sunny
- Referee: Derek Anderson
- TV announcers (LHN): Lowell Galindo (play-by-play), Sam Acho (color), and Alex Chappell (sideline)
- Sources:Stats

Statistics	UTSA	Texas
First downs	29	21
Total yards	408	459
Rushing yards	139	298
Passing yards	269	161
Turnovers	1	0
Time of possession	36:21	23:39

Team	Category	Player	Statistics
UTSA	Passing	Frank Harris	24–35, 222 yards, 0 TD, 1 INT
UTSA	Rushing	Brenden Brady	21 carries, 70 yards, 1 TD
UTSA	Receiving	Zakhari Franklin	6 receptions, 84 yards, 1 TD
Texas	Passing	Hudson Card	15–23, 161 yards, 1 TD
Texas	Rushing	Bijan Robinson	20 carries, 183 yards, 3 TD
Texas	Receiving	Jordan Whittington	4 receptions, 56 yards, 0 TD

Scoring summary

Quarter	Time	Drive			Team	Scoring information	Score	
Quarter	Time	Plays	Yards	TOP	Team	Scoring information	UTSA	TEX
1st	03:28	20	74	8:27	UTSA	24-yard field goal by Jared Sackett (#42)	3	0
2nd	14:03	10	75	4:25	TEX	Roschon Johnson (#2) 11-yard touchdown reception from Hudson Card (#1), Bert Auburn (#45) kick good	3	7
2nd	10:07	10	65	3:56	UTSA	Brenden Brady (#5) 2-yard touchdown run, Jared Sackett (#42) kick good	10	7
2nd	09:36	2	52	0:31	UTSA	Zakhari Franklin (#4) 35-yard touchdown reception from Brenden Brady (#5), Jared Sackett (#42) kick good	17	7
2nd	05:20	11	67	4:08	TEX	Bijan Robinson (#5) 3-yard touchdown run, Bert Auburn (#45) kick good	17	14
2nd	00:12	11	62	2:03	TEX	44-yard field goal by Bert Auburn (#45)	17	17
3rd	11:56	2	80	0:40	TEX	Bijan Robinson (#5) 78-yard touchdown run, Bert Auburn (#45) kick good	17	24
3rd	03:21	13	74	5:38	UTSA	30-yard field goal by Jared Sackett (#42)	20	24
3rd	00:18	1	44	0:08	TEX	Interception returned 44 yards for touchdown by Jahdae Barron (#23), Bert Auburn (#45) kick good	20	31
4th	09:36	4	71	2:10	TEX	Bijan Robinson (#5) 41-yard touchdown run, Bert Auburn (#45) kick good	20	38
4th	04:59	7	48	3:21	TEX	26-yard field goal by Bert Auburn (#45)	20	41
"TOP" = time of possession. For other American football terms, see Glossary of American football.							UTSA 20	TEX 41

=== Texas Southern ===
	1	2	3	4	Total
Tigers	7	10	7	0	24
Roadrunners	14	7	14	17	52

=== At Middle Tennessee ===
	1	2	3	4	Total
Roadrunners	10	21	7	7	45
Blue Raiders	0	20	0	10	30

=== Western Kentucky ===
	1	2	3	4	Total
Hilltoppers	7	7	0	14	28
Roadrunners	7	10	7	7	31

=== At FIU ===
	1	2	3	4	Total
Roadrunners	0	17	7	6	30
Panthers	0	3	0	7	10

Statistics	UTSA	FIU
First downs	23	19
Total yards	433	323
Rushing yards	130	137
Passing yards	303	186
Turnovers	2	1
Time of possession	27:54	32:06

Team	Category	Player	Statistics
UTSA	Passing	Frank Harris	24/35, 303 yards, 2 TD
UTSA	Rushing	Kevorian Barnes	20 rushes, 128 yards, 2 TD
UTSA	Receiving	Zakhari Franklin	6 receptions, 68 yards, TD
FIU	Passing	Grayson James	18/36, 174 yards, INT
FIU	Rushing	Lexington Joseph	6 rushes, 56 yards
FIU	Receiving	Kris Mitchell	2 receptions, 70 yards

=== North Texas ===
	1	2	3	4	Total
Mean Green	6	0	7	14	27
Roadrunners	0	3	7	21	31

Statistics	UNT	UTSA
First downs	13	32
Total yards	347	495
Rushing yards	22	257
Passing yards	325	238
Turnovers	1	1
Time of possession	21:40	38:20

Team	Category	Player	Statistics
North Texas	Passing	Austin Aune	15/31, 325 yards, 3 TD, INT
North Texas	Rushing	Oscar Adaway III	10 rushes, 20 yards
North Texas	Receiving	Roderic Burns	6 receptions, 139 yards
UTSA	Passing	Frank Harris	27/39, 238 yards, 2 TD, INT
UTSA	Rushing	Brenden Brady	19 rushes, 112 yards, 2 TD
UTSA	Receiving	Joshua Cephus	11 receptions, 88 yards, TD

=== At UAB ===
	1	2	3	4	OT	2OT	Total
Roadrunners	7	9	7	8	7	6	44
Blazers	0	10	7	14	7	0	38

Statistics	UTSA	UAB
First downs	26	26
Total yards	494	553
Rushing yards	209	221
Passing yards	285	332
Turnovers	0	1
Time of possession	28:33	31:27

Team	Category	Player	Statistics
UTSA	Passing	Frank Harris	22/31, 285 yards, 4 TD
UTSA	Rushing	Kevorian Barnes	16 rushes, 114 yards, TD
UTSA	Receiving	Zakhari Franklin	7 receptions, 93 yards, 2 TD
UAB	Passing	Jacob Zeno	27/38, 332 yards, 2 TD, INT
UAB	Rushing	DeWayne McBride	19 rushes, 141 yards, 2 TD
UAB	Receiving	Tejhaun Palmer	8 receptions, 110 yards, TD

=== Louisiana Tech ===
	1	2	3	4	Total
Bulldogs	7	0	0	0	7
Roadrunners	21	13	10	7	51

Statistics	LT	UTSA
First downs	17	29
Total yards	259	484
Rushing yards	112	258
Passing yards	147	226
Turnovers	5	1
Time of possession	27:46	32:14

Team	Category	Player	Statistics
Louisiana Tech	Passing	Landry Lyddy	14/26, 138 yards, TD, 2 INT
Louisiana Tech	Rushing	Charvis Thornton	8 rushes, 48 yards
Louisiana Tech	Receiving	Smoke Harris	4 receptions, 49 yards, TD
UTSA	Passing	Frank Harris	18/26, 216 yards, TD
UTSA	Rushing	Kevorian Barnes	11 rushes, 103 yards, 2 TD
UTSA	Receiving	Joshua Cephus	7 receptions, 81 yards, TD

=== At Rice ===
	1	2	3	4	Total
Roadrunners	21	7	13	0	41
Owls	0	0	0	7	7

=== UTEP ===
	1	2	3	4	Total
Miners	14	10	7	0	31
Roadrunners	0	14	17	3	34

=== North Texas (C-USA Championship Game) ===
	1	2	3	4	Total
Mean Green	7	3	10	7	27
Roadrunners	7	17	10	14	48

Statistics	UNT	UTSA
First downs	19	32
Total yards	366	571
Rushing yards	172	227
Passing yards	194	344
Turnovers	2	0
Time of possession	22:17	37:43

Team	Category	Player	Statistics
North Texas	Passing	Austin Aune	14/29, 194 yards, TD, 2 INT
North Texas	Rushing	Ikaika Ragsdale	17 rushes, 108 yards, 1 TD
North Texas	Receiving	Kaylon Horton	3 receptions, 58 yards
UTSA	Passing	Frank Harris	32/37, 341 yards, 4 TD
UTSA	Rushing	Kevorian Barnes	28 rushes, 175 yards, 1 TD
UTSA	Receiving	Zakhari Franklin	10 receptions, 144 yards, 3 TD

=== Troy (Cure Bowl) ===
	1	2	3	4	Total
No. 24 Trojans	0	7	8	3	18
No. 25 Roadrunners	2	10	0	0	12

== Coaching staff ==
Name	Position	Consecutive season at UTSA in current position	Alma Mater
Jeff Traylor	Head coach	3	Stephen F. Austin (1990)
Justin Burke	Associate head coach Special teams coordinator Tight ends	1	Louisville (2011)
Jess Loepp	Defensive coordinator Safeties	2	University of Central Oklahoma (2000)
Matt Mattox	Co-offensive coordinator Offensive Line	1	Houston (2005)
Will Stein	Co-offensive coordinator Quarterbacks	1	Louisville (2011)
Nick Graham	Cornerbacks	3	Tulsa (2013)
Julian Griffin	Running backs	3	Louisiana–Monroe (2012)
Siddiq Haynes	Defensive line	1	Delaware (2011)
Joe Price	Wide receivers	1	Stephen F. Austin (2017)
Brad Sherrod	Linebackers	2	Duke (1993)
Kurt Traylor	Assistant offensive line	1	Texas A&M–Commerce (1995)

== Rankings ==
Ranking movements Legend: ██ Increase in ranking ██ Decrease in ranking — = Not ranked RV = Received votes
	Week															
Poll	Pre	1	2	3	4	5	6	7	8	9	10	11	12	13	14	Final
AP	—	—	—	—	—	—	—	—	RV	RV	RV	RV	RV	23	22	RV
Coaches	RV	—	—	—	—	—	—	RV	RV	RV	RV	RV	25	24	22	RV
CFP	Not released									—	—	—	—	—	25	Not released
