= Philip Baker =

Philip Baker may refer to:

- Philip Baker (chess player) (1880–1932), Irish chess player
- Philip Baker (provost) (born 1523), provost of King's College, Cambridge
- Philip Baker (obstetrician), British obstetrician
- Philip Noel-Baker, Baron Noel-Baker (1889–1982), British politician, diplomat, academic and amateur athlete
- Philip Baker, former leader of the Riverview Church in Western Australia

== See also ==
- Philip Baker Hall (1931–2022), American actor
- Phil Baker (disambiguation)
