= Bryan Baker =

Bryan Baker may refer to:

- Bryan Baker (baseball) (born 1994), American baseball pitcher
- Bryan Baker (fighter) (born 1985), American mixed martial artist
- Bryan Baker (racing driver) (born 1961), American NASCAR driver

== See also ==
- Brian Baker (disambiguation)
