= Phil Baker =

Phil Baker may refer to:

- Phil Baker and Drew Vaupen, American television producers and writers
- Phil Baker (comedian) (1896–1963), American comedian
- Phil Baker (footballer) (born 1952), former Australian rules footballer
- Phil Baker (baseball) (1856–1940), American baseball player
- Phil Baker (rower) (born 1975), British rower

== See also ==
- Philip Baker (disambiguation)
