= Kevorian Barnes =

American football player (born 2003)

Profile
- Position: Running back

Personal information
- Born: August 10, 2003 (age 23); Nacogdoches, Texas, U.S.
- Listed height: 5 ft 9 in (1.75 m)
- Listed weight: 217 lb (98 kg)

Career information
- High school: San Augustine (San Augustine, Texas)
- College: UTSA (2021–2024); TCU (2025)
- NFL draft: 2026: undrafted

Awards and highlights
- Conference USA Freshman of the Year (2022)
- Stats at ESPN

Kevorian Barnes (born August 10, 2003) is an American football running back. He played college football for the UTSA Roadrunners and the TCU Horned Frogs. Barnes signed as an undrafted free agent for the New York Giants.

== Early life ==
Barnes studied at San Augustine High School, where he earned All-District honors in three consecutive seasons. Ranked the #124 running back in the class of 2021 he committed to play college football at University of Texas at San Antonio.

== College career ==
=== UTSA ===
After redshirting in 2021 due to an injury, Barnes would become a contributor for the Roadrunners in 2022. On October 14, 2022, Barnes rushed for 128 yards and 2 touchdowns in a 30-10 win over FIU. In the 2022 Conference USA Championship Barnes would make his first career start, rushing for a career-high 175 yards in the Roadrunners 48-27 victory over North Texas. At the conclusion of the 2022 season, Barnes was named the Conference USA Freshman of the Year.

On December 9, 2024, Barnes announced that he would enter the NCAA transfer portal.

=== TCU ===
On December 17, 2024, Barnes announced that he would transfer to TCU.

=== Statistics ===
Year	Team	Games		Rushing				Receiving			
Year	Team	GP	GS	Att	Yards	Avg	TD	Rec	Yards	Avg	TD
2021	UTSA	2	0	6	16	2.7	0	0	0	0.0	0
2022	UTSA	13	2	135	845	6.3	6	9	119	13.2	0
2023	UTSA	12	11	147	715	4.9	6	14	61	4.4	0
2024	UTSA	12	2	78	221	2.8	2	7	61	8.7	0
2025	TCU	7	7	97	443	4.60	3	10	48	4.80	0
Career		46	22	464	2,246	4.8	17	41	283	6.90	0

== Professional career ==
Pre-draft measurables
Height	Weight	Arm length	Hand span	Wingspan	40-yard dash	10-yard split	20-yard split	20-yard shuttle	Three-cone drill	Vertical jump	Broad jump	Bench press
5 ft 8 5/8 in (1.74 m)	217 lb (98 kg)	30 1/2 in (0.77 m)	9 in (0.23 m)	6 ft 2 3/4 in (1.90 m)	4.62 s	1.63 s	2.64 s	4.40 s	7.46 s	29.5 in (0.75 m)	9 ft 6 in (2.90 m)	17 reps
All values from Pro Day

In April 2026, he attended New York Giants minicamp.
