= Amir Siddiq =

American gridiron football player (born 1997)

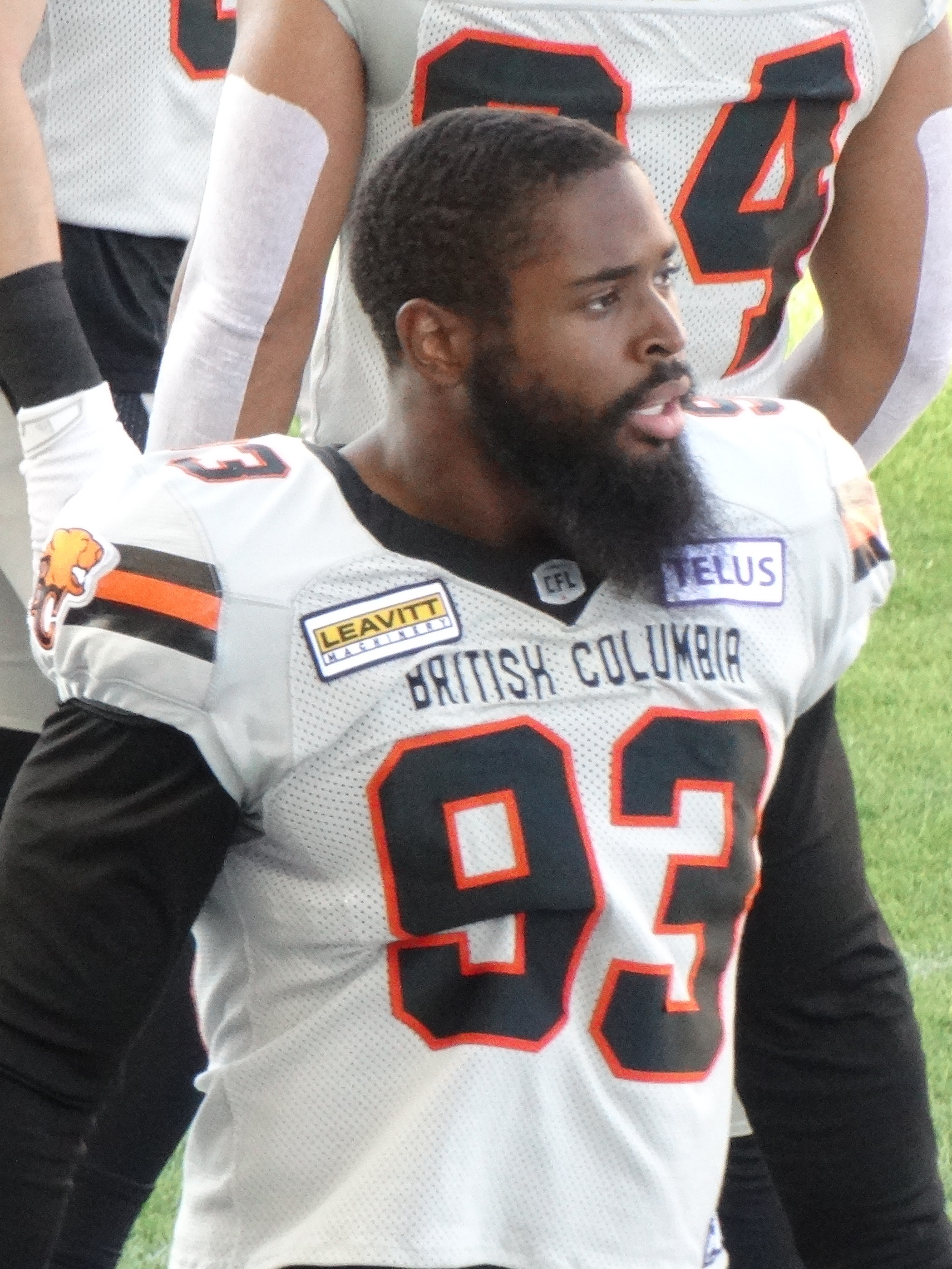
- Siddiq with the BC Lions in 2023

No. 93
- Position: Defensive lineman

Personal information
- Born: December 31, 1997 (age 28); Detroit, Michigan, U.S.
- Listed height: 6 ft 2 in (1.88 m)
- Listed weight: 245 lb (111 kg)

Career information
- High school: Fordson High
- College: Central Michigan; UNC–Charlotte

Career history
- 2023–2024: BC Lions

Awards and highlights
- Second team All-C-USA (2022)
- Stats at CFL.ca

Amir Siddiq (born December 31, 1997) is an American professional football defensive lineman.

== College career ==
After using a redshirt season in 2017, Siddiq played college football for the Central Michigan Chippewas from 2018 to 2021. He played in 39 games where he had 60 total tackles, eight sacks, and one forced fumble. He then transferred to the University of North Carolina at Charlotte in January 2022 where he played for the 49ers later in the fall. In 12 games with the 49ers, he had 47 total tackles and 5.5 sacks.

== Professional career ==
On May 8, 2023, it was announced that Siddiq had signed with the BC Lions. After making the active roster following training camp, he made his professional debut on June 8, 2023, against the Calgary Stampeders. He played in all 18 regular season games in 2023 where he had 13 defensive tackles, six special teams tackles, and one sack.
