= Brian Baker (politician) =

American politician (1973–2021)

Brian Baker (August 9, 1973 – June 24, 2021) was an American politician.

== Biography ==
A Republican, he represented part of Cass County (District 123) in the Missouri House of Representatives. He was elected to the House in November 2002. He served from 2002 to 2008. He later served as the Northern Commissioner for Cass County from 2008 until 2016.

Baker died from COVID-19 on June 24, 2021 in Kansas City, Missouri at age 47 during the COVID-19 pandemic in Missouri.

=== Education ===
Brian Baker received his education from the following institutions:

- MA, Religious Studies, Midwestern Baptist Theological Seminary, 2002
- BA, English Literature, Central Missouri State University, 1998
