= Greg Brown (American football coach) =

American football player and coach (born 1957)

Biographical details
- Born: October 10, 1957 (age 69); Arvada, Colorado, U.S.
- Height: 6 ft 5 in (196 cm)
- Weight: 265 lb (120 kg; 18 st 13 lb)
- Education: UTEP (1980)

Playing career
- 1978–1980: UTEP

Coaching career (HC unless noted)
- 1981: UTEP (GA)
- 1982: Green Mountain HS (CO) (DC)
- 1983–1984: Denver Gold (DB)
- 1984–1986: Tampa Bay Buccaneers (assistant)
- 1987–1988: Wyoming (DB)
- 1989–1990: Purdue (DB)
- 1991–1993: Colorado (DB)
- 1994: Atlanta Falcons (DB)
- 1995–1996: San Diego Chargers (DB)
- 1997–1998: Tennessee Oilers (DB)
- 1999: San Francisco 49ers (DB)
- 2000–2001: Atlanta Falcons (DB)
- 2002–2005: New Orleans Saints (assistant)
- 2005–2010: Colorado (DB)
- 2010: Arizona (co-DC)
- 2011–2012: Colorado (DC)
- 2013: Alabama (DB)
- 2014–2015: Louisville (DB)
- 2016: Missouri (CB)
- 2017–2018: Auburn (DB)
- 2019–2020: Purdue (CB)
- 2022: Charlotte (DC)
- 2023: USC (analyst)
- 2024: Oklahoma State (analyst)
- 2025: Oklahoma State (S)

Greg Brown (born October 10, 1957) is an American football coach, who most recently was the safeties coach at Oklahoma State. He was previously the defensive coordinator at Charlotte and an analyst at USC. He was previously the secondary coach for Auburn University and the Missouri Tigers. Brown, for one season, was the secondary coach for Alabama. He was hired by the Crimson Tide in January 2013 after he served as defensive coordinator for Colorado. In 2010, he was co-defensive coordinator for the Arizona Wildcats. Before becoming co-defensive coordinator with Tim Kish, he previously served as secondary coach for the Colorado Buffaloes. He is the son of former baseball and football coach, NCAA basketball referee and television personality Irv Brown.
