= Chris Reynolds (gridiron football) =

American football player (born 1998)

No. 17
- Position: Quarterback

Personal information
- Born: November 13, 1998 (age 27); Flemington, New Jersey, U.S.
- Listed height: 5 ft 11 in (1.80 m)
- Listed weight: 196 lb (89 kg)

Career information
- High school: Davie County (Mocksville, North Carolina)
- College: Charlotte (2017–2022)
- NFL draft: 2023: undrafted

Career history
- 2023: Calgary Stampeders
- Stats at CFL.ca

Chris Reynolds (born November 13, 1998) is an American former professional football player who was a quarterback for the Calgary Stampeders of the Canadian Football League (CFL). He played college football for the Charlotte 49ers.

== Early life ==
Reynolds played high school football at Davie County High School in Mocksville, North Carolina. He threw for 5,635 yards and 58 touchdowns in high school, setting the school record for most career passing touchdowns. He also played baseball in high school.

== College career ==
Reynolds played college football for the Charlotte 49ers at the University of North Carolina at Charlotte from 2017 to 2022. He began his career as a walk-on. He was redshirted in 2017. Reynolds set UNC Charlotte records for career passing yards and passing touchdowns. He was named honorable mention All-Conference USA by the coaches for four consecutive years from 2019 to 2022.

=== Statistics ===
Year	Team	Games		Passing								Rushing			
Year	Team	GP	GS	Cmp	Att	Pct	Yds	Y/A	TD	Int	Rtg	Att	Yds	Avg	TD
2017	Charlotte	0	0	Did not play											
2018	Charlotte	6	6	100	154	64.9	1,173	7.6	6	2	139.2	40	-64	-1.6	1
2019	Charlotte	13	12	181	291	62.2	2,564	8.8	22	11	153.6	153	791	5.2	6
2020	Charlotte	6	6	96	175	54.9	1,305	7.5	8	2	130.3	50	36	0.7	0
2021	Charlotte	11	11	216	338	63.9	2,680	7.9	26	9	150.6	86	174	2.0	4
2022	Charlotte	10	10	201	316	63.6	2,540	8.0	22	11	147.1	46	-40	-0.9	1
Career		46	45	794	1,274	62.3	10,262	8.1	84	35	146.2	375	897	2.4	12

Stats from Sports Reference LLC:

== Professional career ==
Reynolds was signed by the Calgary Stampeders of the Canadian Football League (CFL) on May 3, 2023. He was moved to the practice roster on August 17 and released from the practice roster on November 5. Overall, he dressed in nine games in 2023, completing one of two passes for five yards and an interception. Reynolds re-signed with the Stampeders on November 22. He was released by the Stampeders on May 15, 2024.
