= Riverview Church =

Pentecostal church in Perth, Australia

- View from across Craig Street
- Riverview Church
- 31.9665°S 115.893°E
- Address: 1 Thorogood Street, Burswood, Perth, Western Australia
- Country: Australia
- Denomination: Non-denominational
- Website: www.riverviewchurch.com.au

History
- Status: Church
- Founded: 1997; 29 years ago

Architecture
- Architect(s): T&Z Architects
- Architectural type: Church
- Style: Modernist
- Completed: 2017; 9 years ago
- Construction cost: A$13M

Specifications
- Materials: Steel; concrete

Riverview Church is a Christian non-denominational church, located at 1 Thorogood Street, Burswood, Perth, Western Australia, Australia. As of 2025, Riverview is one of the largest churches in Western Australia, with weekly attendance averaging 2,000 members.

== History ==
=== Rhema Faith Fellowship ===
The conregation was founded by Brian Baker and his wife, Valerie. The Bakers migrated from England to New Zealand in 1972 and ran various ministries. They subsequently trained in the US at the Rhema Bible Training Center under Kenneth E. Hagin, who came from an Assemblies of God background.

The Bakers started the Inner City Faith Fellowship at Holmes Hall in Belmont, a suburb of Perth, in 1979. The church moved five months later to Brisbane Street, nearer Perth's central business district. Baker was ordained by Hagin in 1980. The Bakers were assisted by pastors from Kansas City who returned overseas after helping to establish Faith Christian Academy, which in 1982 began teaching school students from years 1 to 10 within the church's building.

The church changed name to Rhema Faith Fellowship in 1982, and to Rhema Family Church in 1985, when it moved to its current premises at Thorogood Street, Burswood (then called Victoria Park), which previously operated as a warehouse. The school, renamed Rhema Christian Academy in 1985, had grown to 200 students by the following year and had moved to premises in Colombo Street, across Albany Highway from the church.

A bible school, Rhema Bible Training Centre, was opened and started evangelistic churches around Australia, as well as more than 100 home groups operating in Perth's suburbs. At its peak in the late 1980s, Rhema claimed to have over 3,200 members at its church in Victoria Park and was the biggest single church in Western Australia. By 1989, the church also offered a children's ministry during its main service for those aged up to 15.

In 1989, after a breakdown of the Bakers' marriage and Valerie Baker's resignation from the ministry, Brian Baker appointed his elder son, Philip, as leader of the church. Philip Baker was also a graduate of the Rhema Bible Training Centre and had been the pastor of the children's ministry. Philip Baker instituted a financial management plan for the church to handle mounting debts arising from the late 1980s recession, including disbanding the nationwide Rhema branding for churches and loosening the relationship with the school, which was renamed Regent College. The church began music, drama and multimedia presentations to attract bigger congregations, along with plans for television broadcasts called Rhema Live and the slogan, "The church for people who don't like church".

In 2009, Brian Baker released a book, From Faith to Reason, repudiating many of his former beliefs.

=== Founding of Riverview Church ===
In 1997, Philip and Heather Baker established Riverview Church in the same building as the old Rhema fellowship, with a more ecumenical focus than its past incarnation, and a membership which grew in the early 2000s. Campuses were opened in Joondalup and Cockburn Central. Philip Baker was president of the Australian Christian Churches network and regularly wrote to newspapers and made media appearances representing the charismatic movement's point of view on a range of issues. He stepped down from the leadership in 2009 after being diagnosed with a brain tumour.

The current church building, designed by T&Z Architects, was completed in 2017 at a cost of A$13 million.

In 2021, Riverview Church entered a new chapter with the introduction of shared leadership. A collaborative model grounded in mutuality and shared responsibility evident in the New Testament church.

As of 2026, Riverview Church is led by a team of lead pastors, elders, and a board. They work together as custodians of the church's mission and vision. This reflects a conviction that leadership exists to equip and release the whole church for ministry ("the priesthood of all believers").

== See also ==
- Margaret Court, founder of the Victory Life Centre
