= Brian Baker (American football) =

American football coach (born 1962)

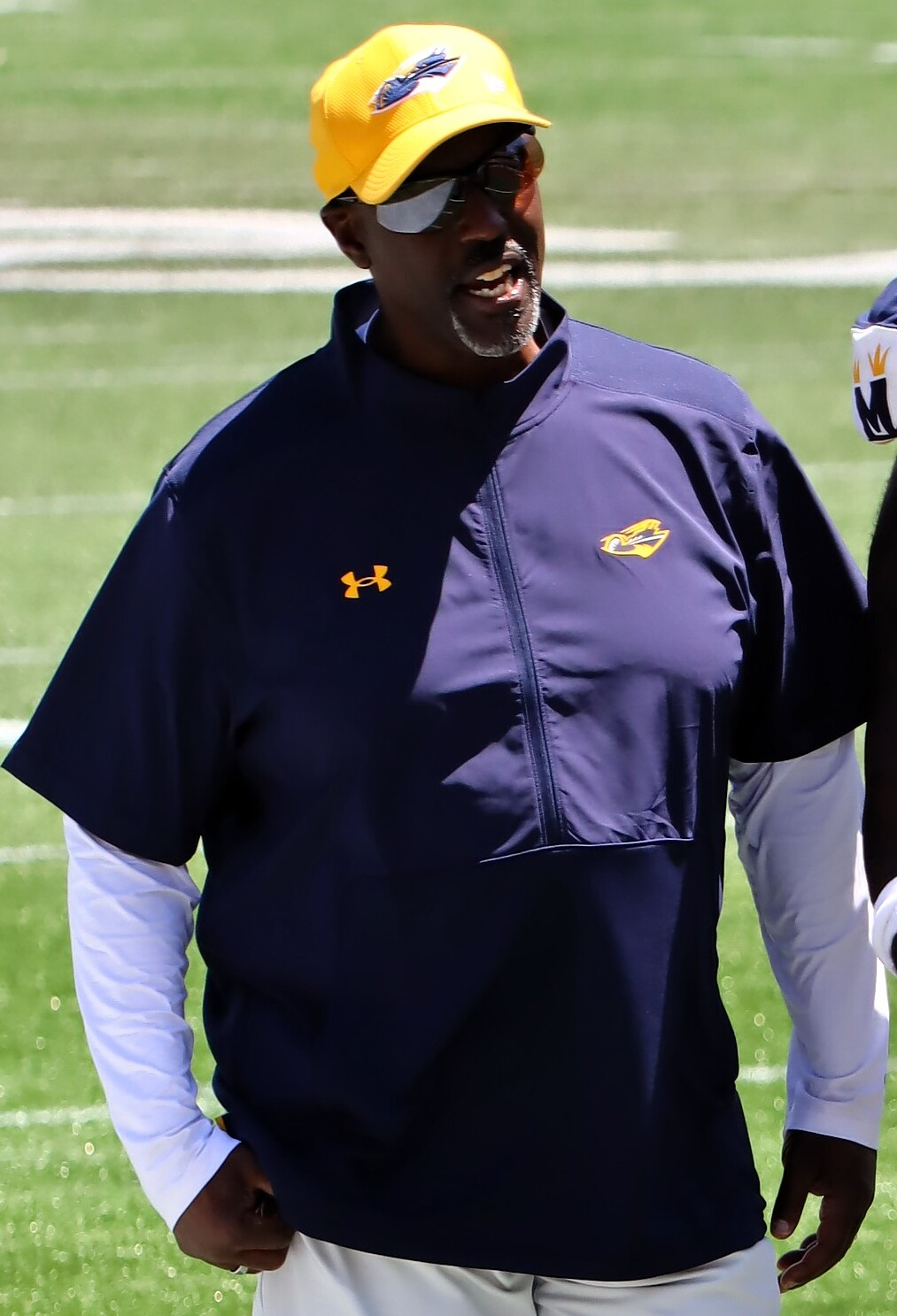
- Baker in 2025

Personal information
- Born: June 20, 1962 (age 64); Baltimore, Maryland, U.S.

Career information
- College: Maryland

Career history
- Maryland (1984) Student assistant; Maryland (1985) Graduate assistant; Army (1986) Running Backs coach; Georgia Tech (1987–1994) Linebackers coach; Georgia Tech (1995) Defensive coordinator, linebackers coach; San Diego Chargers (1996) Defensive line coach; Detroit Lions (1997–2000) Defensive line coach; Minnesota Vikings (2001) Defensive line coach; Minnesota Vikings (2002–2003) Linebackers coach; Minnesota Vikings (2004–2005) Defensive line coach; St. Louis Rams (2006–2008) Defensive line coach; Carolina Panthers (2009–2010) Defensiveline Line coach; Dallas Cowboys (2011–2012) Defensive line coach; Cleveland Browns (2013) Outside linebackers coach; Washington Redskins (2014) Outside linebackers coach; Covenant Christian Academy (TX) (2015) Assistant coach; Mississippi State (2016–2018) Defensive line coach; Alabama (2019) Associate head coach, defensive line coach; Indianapolis Colts (2020–2021) Defensive line coach; Charlotte (2022) Defensive line coach; Georgia Tech (2023) Senior defensive analyst; Memphis Showboats (2025) Defensive line coach; Dallas Renegades (2026–present) Defensive line coach

Awards and highlights
- National champion (1990)

Brian Michael Baker (born June 20, 1962) is an American football coach, former linebacker, and former defensive line coach for the Dallas Renegades of the United Football League (UFL). He had been coaching for over 30 years in football both college and the National Football League (NFL) prior to his joining the Colts.

== Playing career ==
A Baltimore native, Brian played outside linebacker for the Maryland Terrapins between 1980 and their ACC championship in 1983. During his time there, he was teammates with Boomer Esiason and Frank Reich. In 1984, he spent his time working as a student assistant for the Terps. In 1985, he earned a degree in marketing while serving as a graduate assistant.

== Coaching career ==
After the two years coaching at his alma mater Baker went to Army where he served as the running backs coach for 1986. Following his year at Army Baker coached linebackers at Georgia Tech for nine years. In 1995 he added the defensive coordinator. In 1996 he made the leap to the NFL coaching the defensive line coach of the San Diego Chargers as a part of his Maryland head coach Bobby Ross' staff. He left the Chargers with Ross to join the Lions in 1997 coaching the same position, he would stay with Detroit for 4 years of Ross' tenure. For the next five years he would coach for the Minnesota Vikings spending three as a defensive line coach and two coaching linebackers. From 2006 to 2008 Baker served as the defensive line coach for the St. Louis Rams. From 2009 to 2010, Baker coached the defensive line coach for the Panthers. For the next two seasons Baker served as the defensive line coach for the Dallas Cowboys. During his time there, he worked with three Pro Bowlers, DeMarcus Ware, Jay Ratliff, and Anthony Spencer. In 2013 Baker was the outside linebackers coach for the Browns.In 2014 he worked as the outside linebackers coach for the Washington Redskins. In 2015 he worked as an assistant Texas high school football coach. From 2016 to 2018 he was the defensive line coach for Mississippi State. In 2019 he worked as Alabama's defensive line coach under Nick Saban. In 2020 he returned to the NFL as the defensive line coach for the Colts under Frank Reich.

== Personal life ==
Baker and his wife, Nevada, have four daughters, Norell, Nicole, Jade and Jasmine
