= Stadium College Football =

- Country of origin: United States

Production
- Running time: 210 minutes+

Original release
- Network: Stadium; Bally Sports; Marquee Sports Network; Facebook
- Release: September 2, 2017 – 2022

Stadium College Football was the broadcast of NCAA Division I football games by Stadium for the Stadium network, Facebook, the Bally Sports regional networks and Marquee Sports Network. Stadium College Football debuted on September 2, 2017, with a college football game between C-USA's UAB Blazer and SWAC's Alabama A&M Bulldogs.

== History ==
=== Prior to Stadium ===
Prior to Stadium, the Sinclair Broadcast Group (co-owner of Stadium) operated the American Sports Network, which was a sports brand that produced and distributed sports events, including college football, similarly Silver Chalice (co-owner of Stadium) operated Campus Insiders, a service that was dedicated to the online streaming of sporting events, including college football.

On April 13, 2017, it was officially announced that the American Sports Networks and Campus Insiders would merge into Stadium. A television network that would target both broadcast and digital platforms, with the linear service utilizing the syndication and broadcast network built out for ASN, and Campus Insiders providing original studio and long-form programming to the venture. After a soft launch in July 2017, the service officially launched on August 24, with ASN's over-the-air network formally joining Stadium on September 6.

=== On Stadium ===
Stadium launched its college football coverage on September 2, 2017, with a matchup between C-USAs UAB and SWACs Alabama A&M on the Stadium network. On the same day, two other football games, one from the C-USA and one from the Mountain West Conference aired on Facebook.

Stadium College Football's debut season showcased 39 games from Division I-A conferences such as the Mountain West Conference, and C-USA and Division I FCS conferences such as the Patriot League, Big South Conference and SoCon.

=== On Regional Sports Networks ===
In 2019, the Sinclair Broadcast Group acquired the Fox Sports Networks. These networks were rebranded as Bally Sports in 2021. During the 2020 season Stadium produced games featuring the C-USA were distributed to these networks and their affiliates instead of airing on Stadium. Because these telecasts aired on the Fox Sports Networks prior to their rebranding these telecasts used Fox Sports branding leased as part of the transition.

During the 2021 season Stadium produced college football games aired on the Stadium using graphics from sister network Bally Sports. Select games were also simulcasted to sister stations Bally Sports and Marquee Sports Network. (also owned by the Sinclair Broadcast group)

A package of ACC college football games was managed by Bally Sports and used their graphics while airing on their networks, however these telecasts were officially produced by Raycom Sports.

=== On Facebook ===
Since 2017, a select number of Stadium produced college football games have aired on the Stadium Facebook page instead of the Stadium network or regional sports networks. Historically these telecasts have included games from the Patriot League and Conference USA. However as of 2021, the Patriot League no longer has a contract with Stadium. C-USA's new TV deal (starting in 2023) also doesn't include Stadium as well.

== Studio programming ==
In addition to their live game coverage, Stadium also airs Campus Insiders. Campus Insiders is a studio show focusing on college conferences across the nation, including the ACC, Big Ten, Big 12, Conference USA, Mountain West, Pac-12, Patriot League, SEC, and the West Coast Conference. Each day, a different conference is highlighted with exclusive interviews, Top 25 breakdowns, game picks and more.

== Broadcast rights ==
=== Division I FBS ===
- Conference USA: 2017–2022
- Mountain West Conference: 2017–2021
- Atlantic Coast Conference (through ACC on Regional Sports Networks): 2021–2022

=== Division I FCS ===
- Big South Conference: 2017
- Southern Conference: 2017
- Patriot League: 2017–2019

== See also ==
- Stadium (sports network)
- ESPNU College Football
- Campus Insiders
- American Sports Network
- ACC on Regional Sports Networks

== On air staff ==
- Ari Wolfe: primary play-by-play
- Danan Hughes: color commentator
- Chris Vosters: play-by-play
- Sed Bonner: color commentator
- Max Browne: color commentator
- Chris Hassel: play-by-play
- Jordan Palmer: color commentator
- Mike Lamb: color commentator
- Noah Coslov: play-by-play
