= 2022 Conference USA football season =

- League: NCAA Division I Football Bowl Subdivision
- Sport: Football
- Duration: August 27, 2022, to January 31, 2023
- Teams: 11

2023 NFL draft
- Top draft pick: DT Brodric Martin, WKU
- Picked by: Detroit Lions, 96th overall

Regular season
- Season champions: UTSA
- Season MVP: Frank Harris, QB, UTSA

Conference USA Championship Game
- Champions: UTSA
- Runners-up: North Texas
- Finals MVP: Frank Harris, UTSA

Seasons
- ← 2021 2023 →

2022 Conference USA football standings
	Conf.			Overall
Team	W		L	W		L
UTSA y$	8	–	0	11	–	3
Western Kentucky	6	–	2	9	–	5
North Texas y	6	–	2	7	–	7
Middle Tennessee	4	–	4	8	–	5
UAB	4	–	4	7	–	6
Florida Atlantic	4	–	4	5	–	7
Rice	3	–	5	5	–	8
UTEP	3	–	5	5	–	7
FIU	2	–	6	4	–	8
Charlotte	2	–	6	3	–	9
Louisiana Tech	2	–	6	3	–	9
Championship: UTSA 48, North Texas 27
$ – Conference champion; y – Championship game participant; Rankings from AP Poll

The 2022 Conference USA football season was the 27th season of college football play for Conference USA (C-USA). The season started on August 27, 2022, and ended on January 31, 2023. The conference consisted of 11 members and was part of the 2022 NCAA Division I FBS football season.

== Conference realignment ==
Prior to the 2022 season, Conference USA shrank to 11 schools, as previous members Marshall, Old Dominion, and Southern Miss all departed to join the Sun Belt Conference as full members. The move was first announced with the release of the Sun Belt's football schedule on March 1, and confirmed on March 29 when C-USA and the three departing schools reached a settlement of a legal dispute over their departure date.

The 2022 season is the last for six schools in the conference. Charlotte, Florida Atlantic, North Texas, Rice, UAB, and UTSA all left the Conference USA in July 2023 to join the American Athletic Conference. Liberty, New Mexico State, Jacksonville State, and Sam Houston joined the Conference USA in 2023 to replace departing members.

== Preseason ==
=== Recruiting classes ===
Rankings
Team	ESPN	Rivals	24/7
Charlotte			107
Florida Atlantic			124
FIU			101
Louisiana Tech			88
Middle Tennessee			120
North Texas			118
Rice			119
UTEP			129
UTSA	72	61	73
UAB		79	86
Western Kentucky		90	95

=== Conference USA media day ===
The 2022 Conference USA is scheduled for July 27, 2022, at Globe Life Field in Arlington, Texas.

=== Preseason poll ===
The preseason poll was released on July 25, 2022.

Media poll
Predicted finish	Team	1st place votes
1	UTSA	14
2	UAB	8
3	WKU	
4	Florida Atlantic	
5	North Texas	
6	UTEP	
7	Charlotte	
8	Middle Tennessee	
9	Louisiana Tech	
10	Rice	
11	FIU	

=== Preseason player awards ===
Preseason player awards were announced on July 26.

- Offensive Player of the Year: Frank Harris (Redshirt Senior, UTSA quarterback)
- Defensive Player of the Year: Rashad Wisdom (Senior, UTSA safety)
- Special Teams Player of the Year: Brayden Narveson (Redshirt Junior, Western Kentucky kicker)

=== Preseason awards ===
The following list contains C-USA players who were included on preseason watch lists for national awards.

Award	Head Coach/Player	School	Position	Ref
Lott Trophy	none			
Dodd Trophy	none			
Maxwell Award	Chris Reynolds	Charlotte	QB	
Maxwell Award	DeWayne McBride	UAB	RB	
Maxwell Award	Frank Harris	UTSA	QB	
Maxwell Award	Jarret Doege	Western Kentucky	QB	
Davey O'Brien Award	Frank Harris	UTSA	QB	
Davey O'Brien Award	Chris Reynolds	Charlotte	QB	
Doak Walker Award	Ronald Awatt	UTEP	RB	
Doak Walker Award	Jermaine Brown	UAB	RB	
Doak Walker Award	Deion Haskins	UTEP	RB	
Doak Walker Award	DeWayne McBride	UAB	RB	
Biletnikoff Award	Roderic Burns	North Texas	WR	
Biletnikoff Award	Tyrese Chambers	FIU	WR	
Biletnikoff Award	Daewood Davis	Western Kentucky	WR	
Biletnikoff Award	Grant DuBose	Charlotte	WR	
Biletnikoff Award	Zakhari Franklin	UTSA	WR	
John Mackey Award	Oscar Cardenas	UTSA	TE	
John Mackey Award	Rivaldo Fairweather	FIU	TE	
John Mackey Award	Joshua Simon	Western Kentucky	TE	
Rimington Trophy	Will Rykard	UAB	C	
Rimington Trophy	Rusty Staats	Western Kentucky	C	
Butkus Award	KD Davis	North Texas	LB	
Butkus Award	Tyrice Knight	UTEP	LB	
Jim Thorpe Award	Rashad Wisdom	UTSA	S	

Award	Head Coach/Player	School	Position	Ref
Bronko Nagurski Trophy	Praise Amaewhule	UTEP	DE	
Bronko Nagurski Trophy	Grayson Cash	UAB	CB	
Bronko Nagurski Trophy	KD Davis	North Texas	LB	
Bronko Nagurski Trophy	Rashad Wisdom	UTSA	S	
Outland Trophy	Ikenna Enechukwu	Rice	DT	
Outland Trophy	Quantavious Leslie	Western Kentucky	OT	
Outland Trophy	Ahofitu Maka	UTSA	C	
Outland Trophy	Manase Mose	North Texas	C	
Outland Trophy	Kadeem Telfort	UAB	OT	
Lou Groza Award	Jacob Barnes	Louisiana Tech	K	
Lou Groza Award	Brayden Narveson	Western Kentucky	K	
Lou Groza Award	Jared Sackett	UTSA	K	
Ray Guy Award	Bernardo Rodriguez	North Texas	P	
Ray Guy Award	Jacob Barnes	Louisiana Tech	P	
Ray Guy Award	Kyle Greenwell	UAB	P	
Ray Guy Award	Kyle Ulbrich	Middle Tennessee	P	
Ray Guy Award	Lucas Dean	UTSA	P	
Paul Hornung Award	Jermaine Brown	UAB	RB	
Paul Hornung Award	Shadrick Byrd	Charlotte	RB	
Paul Hornung Award	Jaylin Lane	Middle Tennessee	WR	
Wuerffel Trophy	Kendrick Blake Jr.	Charlotte	WR	
Wuerffel Trophy	Joshua Mote	Louisiana Tech	OL	
Wuerffel Trophy	Jordan Ferguson	Middle Tennessee	DL	
Wuerffel Trophy	Ikenna Enechukwu	Rice	DL	
Wuerffel Trophy	Sidney Wells	UAB	OL	
Wuerffel Trophy	Deion Haskins	UTEP	RB	
Wuerffel Trophy	Frank Harris	UTSA	QB	
Wuerffel Trophy	Juwuan Jones	Western Kentucky	DL	

Award	Head Coach/Player	School	Position	Ref
Walter Camp Award	Frank Harris	UTSA	QB	
Bednarik Award	Jordan Ferguson	Middle Tennessee	DE	
Bednarik Award	KD Davis	North Texas	LB	
Bednarik Award	Praise Amaewhule	UTEP	DE	
Bednarik Award	Rashad Wisdom	UTSA	S	
Rotary Lombardi Award	Praise Amaewhule	UTEP	DE	
Rotary Lombardi Award	KD Davis	North Texas	LB	
Rotary Lombardi Award	Jordan Ferguson	Middle Tennessee	DE	
Rotary Lombardi Award	Tyler Grubbs	Louisiana Tech	LB	
Rotary Lombardi Award	Ahofitu Maka	UTSA	C	
Patrick Mannelly Award	none			
Earl Campbell Tyler Rose Award	Ronald Awatt	UTEP	RB	
Earl Campbell Tyler Rose Award	Roderic Burns	North Texas	RB	
Earl Campbell Tyler Rose Award	Jarret Doege	Western Kentucky	QB	
Earl Campbell Tyler Rose Award	Frank Harris	UTSA	QB	
Earl Campbell Tyler Rose Award	Bradley Rozner	Rice	WR	
Manning Award	Frank Harris	UTSA	QB	
Manning Award	Chris Reynolds	Charlotte	QB	
Polynesian College Football Player of the Year Award	Ahofitu Maka	UTSA	OL	
Polynesian College Football Player of the Year Award	Manase Mose	North Texas	OL	
Johnny Unitas Golden Arm Award	Chase Cunningham	Middle Tennessee	QB	
Johnny Unitas Golden Arm Award	Dylan Hopkins	UAB	QB	
Johnny Unitas Golden Arm Award	N'Kosi Perry	Florida Atlantic	QB	
Johnny Unitas Golden Arm Award	Chris Reynolds	Charlotte	QB	
Ted Hendricks Award				

== Head coaches ==
- On November 10, 2021, Butch Davis announced that he would not return to FIU after the school declined to extend his contract. On December 9, 2021, FIU announced Mike MacIntyre as the school's new head coach. MacIntyre had previously been a coach in various position both at other collegiate schools and at the NFL level, including being head coach for a time at both San Jose State and Colorado.
- On November 26, 2021, Louisiana Tech announced that they were firing head coach Skip Holtz. Holtz was allowed to coach the final game of the season before being dismissed immediately after. The school announced on November 30, 2021, that Texas Tech offensive coordinator Sonny Cumbie would take over as the new head coach.
- On June 24, UAB head coach Bill Clark announced that he was retiring from his position effective August 1 due to chronic health issues dealing with his back. Offensive coordinator Bryant Vincent took over as the interim head coach.

Note: All stats shown are before the start of the 2022 season.

Team	Head coach	Years at school	Overall record	Record at school	CUSA Record
Charlotte	Will Healy	4	27–38	14–17	10–10
Florida Atlantic	Willie Taggart	3	66–73	10–11	7–7
FIU	Mike MacIntyre	1	46–65	0–0	0–0
Louisiana Tech	Sonny Cumbie	1	2–3	0–0	0–0
Middle Tennessee	Rick Stockstill	16	101–98	101–98	75–49
North Texas	Seth Littrell	6	37–38	37–38	26–21
Rice	Mike Bloomgren	5	11–31	11–31	9–20
UAB	Bryant Vincent	1	0–0	0–0	0–0
UTEP	Dana Dimel	5	42–72	12–33	5–23
UTSA	Jeff Traylor	3	19–7	19–7	12–3
Western Kentucky	Tyson Helton	4	23–16	23–16	17–6

=== Mid-season changes ===
- On October 23, Charlotte fired head coach Will Healy after a 1–7 start to the season. Offensive line coach Peter Rossomando was named the interim replacement at head coach. On November 15, Charlotte announced that Biff Poggi would take over as the permanent head coach beginning in 2023.

=== Post-season changes ===
- On November 26, Florida Atlantic announced that they had fired head coach Willie Taggart. Taggart had posted a record of 15–18 over three years at the school. On December 1, Florida Atlantic announced that former Texas head coach Tom Herman would take over as head coach at FAU for the 2023 season.
- On November 30, UAB announced that they had hired Trent Dilfer as the new permanent head coach, replacing interim coach Bryant Vincent. Dilfer would begin coaching the team on December 2.
- On December 4. North Texas announced that they had fired head coach Seth Littrell. Littrell had posted a 44–44 record with the school in seven years at the school. Defensive coordinator Phil Bennett took over as interim head coach for the Frisco Bowl. On December 13 North Texas announced that Washington State offensive coordinator Eric Morris would take over as head coach.

== Rankings ==
		Pre	Wk 1	Wk 2	Wk 3	Wk 4	Wk 5	Wk 6	Wk 7	Wk 8	Wk 9	Wk 10	Wk 11	Wk 12	Wk 13	Wk 14	Final
Charlotte	AP																
Charlotte	C																
Charlotte	CFP	Not released															
Florida Atlantic	AP																
Florida Atlantic	C																
Florida Atlantic	CFP	Not released															
FIU	AP																
FIU	C																
FIU	CFP	Not released															
Louisiana Tech	AP																
Louisiana Tech	C																
Louisiana Tech	CFP	Not released															
Middle Tennessee	AP																
Middle Tennessee	C																
Middle Tennessee	CFP	Not released															
North Texas	AP																
North Texas	C																
North Texas	CFP	Not released															
Rice	AP																
Rice	C																
Rice	CFP	Not released															
UAB	AP																
UAB	C																
UAB	CFP	Not released															
UTEP	AP																
UTEP	C																
UTEP	CFP	Not released															
UTSA	AP									RV	RV	RV	RV	RV	23	22	RV
UTSA	C	RV							RV	RV	RV	RV	RV	25	24	22	RV
UTSA	CFP	Not released														25	
Western Kentucky	AP																
Western Kentucky	C																
Western Kentucky	CFP	Not released															

Legend
	Improvement in ranking
	Drop in ranking
	Not ranked previous week
	No change in ranking from previous week
RV	Received votes but were not ranked in Top 25 of poll
т	Tied with team above or below also with this symbol

== Schedule ==
Index to colors and formatting
C-USA member won
C-USA member lost
C-USA teams in **bold**

All times Eastern time.

=== Week 0 ===
Date	Time	Visiting team	Home team	Site	TV	Result	Attendance	Ref.
August 27	12:00 p.m.	Austin Peay	**Western Kentucky**	Houchens Industries–L. T. Smith Stadium • Bowling Green, KY	CBSSN	**W** 38–27	13,688	
August 27	7:00 p.m.	**Charlotte**	**Florida Atlantic**	FAU Stadium • Boca Raton, FL	CBSSN	**FAU** 43–13	19,571	
August 27	9:00 p.m.	**North Texas**	**UTEP**	Sun Bowl • El Paso, TX	Stadium	**UNT** 31–13	51,500	
^{#}Rankings from AP Poll released prior to game. All times are in Eastern Time.

=== Week 1 ===
Date	Time	Visiting team	Home team	Site	TV	Result	Attendance	Ref.
September 1	7:00 p.m.	Bryant	**FIU**	Riccardo Silva Stadium • Westchester, FL	ESPN3	**W** 38–37 ^{OT}	-	
September 1	8:00 p.m.	Alabama A&M	**UAB**	Protective Stadium • Birmingham, AL	CBSSN	**W** 59–0	32,542	
September 1	8:00 p.m.	**Louisiana Tech**	Missouri	Faurot Field • Columbia, MO	ESPNU	**L** 24–52	47,653	
September 2	7:00 p.m.	William & Mary	**Charlotte**	Jerry Richardson Stadium • Charlotte, NC	ESPN3	**L** 24–41	13,940	
September 3	3:30 p.m.	**UTEP**	No. 9 Oklahoma	Gaylord Family Oklahoma Memorial Stadium • Norman, OK	FOX	**L** 13–45	83,173	
September 3	3:30 p.m.	No. 24 Houston	**UTSA**	Alamodome • San Antonio, TX	CBSSN	**L** 35–37 ^{3OT}	37,526	
September 3	6:00 p.m.	**Florida Atlantic**	Ohio	Peden Stadium • Athens, OH	ESPN+	**L** 38–41	20,003	
September 3	6:00 p.m.	**Middle Tennessee**	James Madison	Bridgeforth Stadium • Harrisonburg, VA	ESPN+	**L** 7–44	23,074	
September 3	6:00 p.m.	**Rice**	No. 14 USC	Los Angeles Memorial Coliseum • Los Angeles, CA	P12N	**L** 14–66	60,113	
September 3	9:00 p.m.	SMU	**North Texas**	Apogee Stadium • Denton, TX (Safeway Bowl)	CBSSN	**L** 10–48	25,306	
September 3	11:59 p.m.	**Western Kentucky**	Hawaii	Clarence T. C. Ching Athletics Complex • Honolulu, HI	Spectrum/MWSN	**W** 49–17	9,346	
^{#}Rankings from AP Poll released prior to game. All times are in Eastern Time.

=== Week 2 ===
Date	Time	Visiting team	Home team	Site	TV	Result	Attendance	Ref.
September 10	12:00 p.m.	**UTSA**	Army	Michie Stadium • West Point, NY	CBSSN	**W** 41–38 ^{OT}	23,551	
September 10	3:30 p.m.	Maryland	**Charlotte**	Jerry Richardson Stadium • Charlotte, NC	Stadium	**L** 21–56	12,614	
September 10	4:00 p.m.	**Middle Tennessee**	Colorado State	Canvas Stadium • Fort Collins, CO		**W** 34–19	27,641	
September 10	6:00 p.m.	**UAB**	Liberty	Williams Stadium • Lynchburg, VA	ESPN+	**L** 14–21	18,892	
September 10	6:00 p.m.	No. 21 (FCS) Southeastern Louisiana	**Florida Atlantic**	FAU Stadium • Boca Raton, FL	ESPN3	**W** 42–9	17,532	
September 10	6:00 p.m.	**FIU**	Texas State	Bobcat Stadium • San Marcos, TX	ESPN+	**L** 12–41	18,757	
September 10	7:00 p.m.	No. 18 (FCS) Stephen F. Austin	**Louisiana Tech**	Joe Aillet Stadium • Ruston, LA	ESPN3	**W** 52–17	16,094	
September 10	7:30 p.m.	Texas Southern	**North Texas**	Apogee Stadium • Denton, TX	ESPN3	**W** 59–27	15,984	
September 10	7:30 p.m.	McNeese State	**Rice**	Rice Stadium • Houston, TX	ESPN3	**W** 52–10	18,629	
September 10	9:00 p.m.	New Mexico State	**UTEP**	Sun Bowl • El Paso, TX (Battle of I-10)	ESPN+	**W** 20–13	23,325	
^{#}Rankings from AP Poll released prior to game. All times are in Eastern Time.

=== Week 3 ===
Date	Time	Visiting team	Home team	Site	TV	Result	Attendance	Ref.
September 17	12:00 p.m.	**Western Kentucky**	Indiana	Memorial Stadium • Bloomington, IN	BTN	**L** 30–33 ^{OT}	48,952	
September 17	3:00 p.m.	**North Texas**	UNLV	Allegiant Stadium • Paradise, NV	MW Network	**L** 27–58	19,623	
September 17	3:30 p.m.	Georgia Southern	**UAB**	Protective Stadium • Birmingham, AL	Stadium	**W** 35–21	24,302	
September 17	6:00 p.m.	**UTEP**	New Mexico	University Stadium • Albuquerque, NM		**L** 10–27	15,269	
September 17	7:00 p.m.	**Charlotte**	Georgia State	Center Parc Stadium • Atlanta, GA	ESPN+	**W** 42–41	16,433	
September 17	7:00 p.m.	Tennessee State	**Middle Tennessee**	Johnny "Red" Floyd Stadium • Murfreesboro, TN	ESPN3/ESPN+	**W** 49–6	22,227	
September 17	7:30 p.m.	UCF	**Florida Atlantic**	FAU Stadium • Boca Raton, FL	CBSSN	**L** 14–40	30,991	
September 18	7:30 p.m.	Louisiana	**Rice**	Rice Stadium • Houston, TX	ESPN+	**W** 33–21	18,746	
September 17	8:00 p.m.	**Louisiana Tech**	No. 5 Clemson	Memorial Stadium • Clemson, SC	ACCN	**L** 20–48	80,542	
September 17	8:00 p.m.	**UTSA**	No. 21 Texas	Darrell K Royal–Texas Memorial Stadium • Austin, TX	LHN	**L** 20–41	102,520	
^{#}Rankings from AP Poll released prior to game. All times are in Eastern Time.

=== Week 4 ===
Date	Time	Visiting team	Home team	Site	TV	Result	Attendance	Ref.
September 23	9:00 p.m.	Boise State	**UTEP**	Sun Bowl • El Paso, TX	CBSSN	**W** 27–10	11,227	
September 24	3:30 p.m.	**Middle Tennessee**	No. 25 Miami (FL)	Hard Rock Stadium • Miami Gardens, FL	ACCN	**W** 45–31	46,713	
September 24	3:30 p.m.	**FIU**	**Western Kentucky**	Houchens Industries–L. T. Smith Stadium • Bowling Green, KY	CBSSN	**WKU** 73–0	15,127	
September 24	3:30 p.m.	**North Texas**	Memphis	Liberty Bowl Memorial Stadium • Memphis, TN	ESPN+	**L** 34–44	23,203	
September 24	3:30 p.m.	Texas Southern	**UTSA**	Alamodome • San Antonio, TX	Stadium	**W** 52–24	22,562	
September 24	6:00 p.m.	**Rice**	Houston	TDECU Stadium • Houston, TX (rivalry)	ESPN+	**L** 27–34	26,377	
September 24	7:00 p.m.	**Louisiana Tech**	South Alabama	Hancock Whitney Stadium • Mobile, AL	ESPN+	**L** 14–38	17,939	
September 24	7:30 p.m.	**Florida Atlantic**	Purdue	Ross–Ade Stadium • West Lafayette, IN	BTN	**L** 26–28	55,137	
September 24	7:30 p.m.	**Charlotte**	South Carolina	Williams–Brice Stadium • Columbia, SC	ESPNU	**L** 20–56	77,982	
^{#}Rankings from AP Poll released prior to game. All times are in Eastern Time.

=== Week 5 ===
Date	Time	Visiting team	Home team	Site	TV	Result	Attendance	Ref.
September 30	7:30 p.m.	**UTSA**	**Middle Tennessee**	Johnny "Red" Floyd Stadium • Murfreesboro, TN	CBSSN	**UTSA** 45–30	15,020	
October 1	4:00 p.m.	**Florida Atlantic**	**North Texas**	Apogee Stadium • Denton, TX	ESPN+	**UNT** 45–28	18,274	
October 1	6:00 p.m.	**UTEP**	**Charlotte**	Jerry Richardson Stadium • Charlotte, NC	ESPN3	**UTEP** 41–35	9,547	
October 1	7:00 p.m.	Troy	**Western Kentucky**	Houchens Industries–L. T. Smith Stadium • Bowling Green, KY	ESPN+	**L** 27–34	20,168	
October 1	7:30 p.m.	**UAB**	**Rice**	Rice Stadium • Houston, TX	ESPN+	**RICE** 28–24	21,926	
October 1	8:00 p.m.	**FIU**	New Mexico State	Aggie Memorial Stadium • Las Cruces, NM	FloSports	**W** 21–7	10,423	
^{#}Rankings from AP Poll released prior to game. All times are in Eastern Time.

=== Week 6 ===
Date	Time	Visiting team	Home team	Site	TV	Result	Attendance	Ref.
October 8	3:30 p.m.	**Middle Tennessee**	**UAB**	Protective Stadium • Birmingham, AL	Stadium	**UAB** 41–14	23,694	
October 8	6:00 p.m.	**Western Kentucky**	**UTSA**	Alamodome • San Antonio, TX	ESPN+	**UTSA** 31–28	22,328	
October 8	7:00 p.m.	UConn	**FIU**	Riccardo Silva Stadium • Westchester, FL	ESPN3	**L** 12–33	16,689	
October 8	7:00 p.m.	**UTEP**	**Louisiana Tech**	Joe Aillet Stadium • Ruston, LA	ESPN+	**LT** 41–31	16,375	
^{#}Rankings from AP Poll released prior to game. All times are in Eastern Time.

=== Week 7 ===
Date	Time	Visiting team	Home team	Site	TV	Result	Attendance	Ref.
October 14	8:00 p.m.	**UTSA**	**FIU**	Riccardo Silva Stadium • Westchester, FL	CBSSN	**UTSA** 30–10	14,122	
October 15	3:30 p.m.	**Charlotte**	**UAB**	Protective Stadium • Birmingham, AL	Stadium	**UAB** 34–20	22,101	
October 15	3:30 p.m.	**Western Kentucky**	**Middle Tennessee**	Johnny "Red" Floyd Stadium • Murfreesboro, TN (100 Miles of Hate)	ESPN+	**WKU** 35–17	14,806	
October 15	4:00 p.m.	**Louisiana Tech**	**North Texas**	Apogee Stadium • Denton, TX	ESPN+	**UNT** 47–27	16,590	
October 15	6:00 p.m.	**Rice**	**Florida Atlantic**	FAU Stadium • Boca Raton, FL	ESPN+	**FAU** 17–14	21,465	
^{#}Rankings from AP Poll released prior to game. All times are in Eastern Time.

=== Week 8 ===
Date	Time	Visiting team	Home team	Site	TV	Result	Attendance	Ref.
October 21	8:00 p.m.	**UAB**	**Western Kentucky**	Houchens Industries–L. T. Smith Stadium • Bowling Green, KY	CBSSN	**WKU** 20–17	16,334	
October 22	3:00 p.m.	**Rice**	**Louisiana Tech**	Joe Aillet Stadium • Ruston, LA	ESPN+	**RICE** 42–41 ^{OT}	18,300	
October 22	3:30 p.m.	**FIU**	**Charlotte**	Jerry Richardson Stadium • Charlotte, NC	ESPN3	**FIU** 34–15	10,576	
October 22	3:30 p.m.	**North Texas**	**UTSA**	Alamodome • San Antonio, TX	Stadium	**UTSA** 31–27	27,122	
October 22	4:00 p.m.	**Florida Atlantic**	**UTEP**	Sun Bowl • El Paso, TX	ESPN+	**UTEP** 24–21	12,796	
^{#}Rankings from AP Poll released prior to game. All times are in Eastern Time.

=== Week 9 ===
Date	Time	Visiting team	Home team	Site	TV	Result	Attendance	Ref.
October 28	8:00 p.m.	**Louisiana Tech**	**FIU**	Riccardo Silva Stadium • Westchester, FL	CBSSN	**FIU** 42–34 ^{2OT}	12,478	
October 29	2:00 p.m.	**Charlotte**	**Rice**	Rice Stadium • Houston, TX	ESPN3	**CHAR** 56–23	18,187	
October 29	3:30 p.m.	**North Texas**	**Western Kentucky**	Houchens Industries–L. T. Smith Stadium • Bowling Green, KY	Stadium	**UNT** 40–13	17,194	
October 29	7:00 p.m.	**UAB**	**Florida Atlantic**	FAU Stadium • Boca Raton, FL	CBSSN	**FAU** 24–17	16,138	
October 29	9:00 p.m.	**Middle Tennessee**	**UTEP**	Sun Bowl • El Paso, TX	ESPN+	**MTSU** 24–13	10,727	
^{#}Rankings from AP Poll released prior to game. All times are in Eastern Time.

=== Week 10 ===
Date	Time	Visiting team	Home team	Site	TV	Result	Attendance	Ref.
November 3	7:00 p.m.	**UTEP**	**Rice**	Rice Stadium • Houston, TX	CBSSN	**RICE** 37–30	18,326	
November 5	12:00 p.m.	**Western Kentucky**	**Charlotte**	Jerry Richardson Stadium • Charlotte, NC	CBSSN	**WKU** 59–7	10,857	
November 5	3:00 p.m.	**Middle Tennessee**	**Louisiana Tech**	Joe Aillet Stadium • Ruston, LA	ESPN+	**LT** 40–24	14,298	
November 5	3:30 p.m.	**UTSA**	**UAB**	Protective Stadium • Birmingham, AL	Stadium	**UTSA** 44–38 ^{2OT}	17,205	
November 5	4:00 p.m.	**FIU**	**North Texas**	Apogee Stadium • Denton, TX	ESPN+	**UNT** 52–14	22,308	
^{#}Rankings from AP Poll released prior to game. All times are in Eastern Time.

=== Week 11 ===
Date	Time	Visiting team	Home team	Site	TV	Result	Attendance	Ref.
November 12	2:00 p.m.	**Rice**	**Western Kentucky**	Houchens Industries–L. T. Smith Stadium • Bowling Green, KY	ESPN+	**WKU** 45–10	-	
November 12	3:30 p.m.	**Charlotte**	**Middle Tennessee**	Johnny "Red" Floyd Stadium • Murfreesboro, TN	ESPN3	**MTSU** 24–14	-	
November 12	3:30 p.m.	**North Texas**	**UAB**	Protective Stadium • Birmingham, AL	Stadium	**UAB** 41–21	-	
November 12	3:30 p.m.	**Louisiana Tech**	**UTSA**	Alamodome • San Antonio, TX	ESPN+	**UTSA** 51–7	-	
November 12	7:00 p.m.	**Florida Atlantic**	**FIU**	Riccardo Silva Stadium • Westchester, FL (Shula Bowl)	Stadium	**FAU** 52–7	-	
^{#}Rankings from AP Poll released prior to game. All times are in Eastern Time.

=== Week 12 ===
Date	Time	Visiting team	Home team	Site	TV	Result	Attendance	Ref.
November 19	1:00 p.m.	UTSA	**Rice**	Rice Stadium • Houston, TX	ESPN+	**UTSA** 41–7	18,249	
November 19	3:30 p.m.	Florida Atlantic	**Middle Tennessee**	Johnny "Red" Floyd Stadium • Murfreesboro, TN	ESPN+	**MTSU** 49–21	9,958	
November 19	3:30 p.m.	Louisiana Tech	**Charlotte**	Jerry Richardson Stadium • Charlotte, NC	ESPN3	**CHAR** 26–21	7,905	
November 19	4:00 p.m.	FIU	**UTEP**	Sun Bowl • El Paso, TX	ESPN+	**UTEP** 40–6	10,758	
November 19	4:00 p.m.	Western Kentucky	Auburn	Jordan–Hare Stadium • Auburn, AL	SECN	**L** 17–41	81,824	
November 19	9:00 p.m.	UAB	No. 6 LSU	Tiger Stadium • Baton Rouge, LA	ESPN2	**L** 10–41	97,367	
^{#}Rankings from AP Poll released prior to game. All times are in Eastern Time.

=== Week 13 ===
Date	Time	Visiting team	Home team	Site	TV	Result	Attendance	Ref.
November 26	1:00 p.m.	**Western Kentucky**	**Florida Atlantic**	FAU Stadium • Boca Raton, FL	CBSSN	**WKU** 32–31 ^{OT}	-	
November 26	2:00 p.m.	**Rice**	**North Texas**	Apogee Stadium • Denton, TX	ESPN+	**UNT** 21–17	-	
November 26	3:30 p.m.	**UAB**	**Louisiana Tech**	Joe Aillet Stadium • Ruston, LA	CBSSN	**UAB** 37–27	-	
November 26	3:30 p.m.	**UTEP**	**UTSA**	Alamodome • San Antonio, TX	Stadium	**UTSA** 34–31	-	
November 26	6:00 p.m.	**Middle Tennessee**	**FIU**	Riccardo Silva Stadium • Westchester, FL	ESPN3	**MTSU** 33–28	-	
^{#}Rankings from AP Poll released prior to game. All times are in Eastern Time.

=== Conference USA Championship Game ===
Date	Time	Visiting team	Home team	Site	TV	Result	Attendance	Ref.
December 3	8:00 p.m.	**North Texas**	No. 23 **UTSA**	Alamodome • San Antonio, TX	CBSSN	**UTSA** 48–27	41,412	
^{#}Rankings from AP Poll released prior to game. All times are in Eastern Time.

== Postseason ==
=== Bowl Games ===
Legend
C-USA Win
C-USA Loss

Bowl game	Date	Site	Television	Time (EST)	C-USA team	Opponent	Score	Attendance
Bahamas Bowl	December 16	Thomas Robinson Stadium • Nassau, Bahamas	ESPN	11:30 a.m.	UAB	Miami (OH)	W 24–20	12,172
Cure Bowl	December 16	Exploria Stadium • Orlando, FL	ESPN	3:00 p.m.	UTSA	Troy	L 12–18	11,911
LendingTree Bowl	December 17	Hancock Whitney Stadium • Mobile, AL	ESPN	5:45 p.m.	Rice	Southern Miss	L 24–38	20,512
Frisco Bowl	December 17	Toyota Stadium • Frisco, TX	ESPN	9:15 p.m.	North Texas	Boise State	L 32–35	12,211
New Orleans Bowl	December 21	Caesars Superdome • New Orleans, LA	ESPN	9:00 p.m.	Western Kentucky	South Alabama	W 44–23	13,456
Hawaii Bowl	December 24	Clarence T. C. Ching Athletics Complex • Honolulu, HI	ESPN	8:00 p.m	Middle Tennessee	San Diego State	W 25–23	6,605

Rankings are from AP Poll • All times Eastern Time Zone.

=== Selection of teams ===
- Bowl eligible (6): Middle Tennessee, North Texas, Rice, (Note: Rice had a 5–7 record for the season, but was selected for a bowl game as there were not enough teams with 6 wins to fill all bowl game slots.) UAB, UTSA, Western Kentucky
- Bowl-ineligible (5): Charlotte, FIU, Florida Atlantic, Louisiana Tech, UTEP

== Conference USA records vs other conferences ==
2022–2023 records against non-conference foes:

Power Conferences 5	Record
ACC	1–1
Big Ten	0–3
Big 12	0–2
Pac-12	0–1
BYU/Notre Dame	0–0
SEC	0–4
Power 5 Total	1–11
Other FBS Conferences	Record
American	0–5
Independents (Excluding Notre Dame and BYU)	3–2
MAC	0–1
Mountain West	3–1
Sun Belt	3–4
Other FBS Total	9–13
FCS Opponents	Record
Football Championship Subdivision	9–1
Total Non-Conference Record	19–23

=== Conference USA vs Power 5 matchups ===
This is a list of games C-USA has scheduled versus power conference teams (ACC, Big 10, Big 12, Pac-12, BYU, Notre Dame and SEC). All rankings are from the current AP Poll at the time of the game.

Date	Conference	Visitor	Home	Site	Score
September 1	SEC	Louisiana Tech	Missouri	Faurot Field • Columbia, MO	L 24–52
September 3	Big 12	UTEP	No. 9 Oklahoma	Gaylord Family Oklahoma Memorial Stadium • Norman, OK	L 13–45
September 3	Pac-12	Rice	No. 14 USC	Los Angeles Memorial Coliseum • Los Angeles, CA	L 14–66
September 10	Big Ten	Maryland	Charlotte	Jerry Richardson Stadium • Charlotte, NC	L 21–56
September 17	Big Ten	Western Kentucky	Indiana	Memorial Stadium • Bloomington, IN	L 30–33 ^{OT}
September 17	ACC	Louisiana Tech	No. 5 Clemson	Memorial Stadium • Clemson, SC	L 20–48
September 17	Big 12	UTSA	No. 21 Texas	Darrell K Royal–Texas Memorial Stadium • Austin, TX	L 20–41
September 24	Big Ten	Florida Atlantic	Purdue	Ross–Ade Stadium • West Lafayette, IN	L 26–28
September 24	SEC	Charlotte	South Carolina	Williams–Brice Stadium • Columbia, SC	L 20–56
September 24	ACC	Middle Tennessee	No. 25 Miami (FL)	Hard Rock Stadium • Miami Gardens, FL	W 45–31
November 19	SEC	UAB	LSU	Tiger Stadium • Baton Rouge, LA	L 10-41
November 19	SEC	Western Kentucky	Auburn	Jordan–Hare Stadium • Auburn, AL	L 17-41

=== Conference USA vs Group of Five matchups ===
The following games include C-USA teams competing against teams from the American, MAC, Mountain West, or Sun Belt.

Date	Conference	Visitor	Home	Site	Score
September 3	American	No. 24 Houston	UTSA	Alamodome • San Antonio, TX	L 35–37 ^{3OT}
September 3	MAC	Florida Atlantic	Ohio	Peden Stadium • Athens, OH	L 38–41
September 3	Sun Belt	Middle Tennessee	James Madison	Bridgeforth Stadium • Harrisonburg, VA	L 7–44
September 3	American	SMU	North Texas	Apogee Stadium • Denton, TX (Safeway Bowl)	L 10–48
September 3	Mountain West	Western Kentucky	Hawaii	Clarence T. C. Ching Athletics Complex • Honolulu, HI	W 49–17
September 10	Mountain West	Middle Tennessee	Colorado State	Canvas Stadium • Fort Collins, CO	W 34–19
September 10	Sun Belt	FIU	Texas State	Bobcat Stadium • San Marcos, TX	L 12–41
September 17	Sun Belt	Georgia Southern	UAB	Protective Stadium • Birmingham, AL	W 35–21
September 17	Sun Belt	Charlotte	Georgia State	Center Parc Stadium • Atlanta, GA	W 42–41
September 17	American	UCF	Florida Atlantic	FAU Stadium • Boca Raton, FL	L 14–40
September 17	Sun Belt	Louisiana	Rice	Rice Stadium • Houston, TX	W 33–21
September 17	Mountain West	UTEP	New Mexico	University Stadium • Albuquerque, NM (Rio Grande Rivalry)	L 10–27
September 23	Mountain West	Boise State	UTEP	Sun Bowl • El Paso, TX	W 27–10
September 24	Sun Belt	Louisiana Tech	South Alabama	Hancock Whitney Stadium • Mobile, AL	L 14–38
September 24	American	North Texas	Memphis	Liberty Bowl Memorial Stadium • Memphis, TN	L 34–44
September 24	American	Rice	Houston	TDECU Stadium • Houston, TX (rivalry)	L 27–34
October 1	Sun Belt	Troy	Western Kentucky	Houchens Industries–L. T. Smith Stadium • Bowling Green, KY	L 27–34

=== Conference USA vs FBS independents matchups ===
The following games include C-USA teams competing against FBS Independents, which includes Army, Liberty, New Mexico State, UConn, or UMass.

Date	Conference	Visitor	Home	Site	Score
September 10	Independent	UTSA	Army	Michie Stadium • West Point, NY	W 41–38 ^{OT}
September 10	Independent	UAB	Liberty	Williams Stadium • Lynchburg, VA	L 14–21
September 10	Independent	New Mexico State	UTEP	Sun Bowl • El Paso, NM (Battle of I-10)	W 20–13
October 1	Independent	FIU	New Mexico State	Aggie Memorial Stadium • Las Cruces, NM	W 21–7
October 8	Independent	UConn	FIU	Riccardo Silva Stadium • Miami, FL	L 12–33

=== Conference USA vs FCS matchups ===
Date	Visitor	Home	Site	Score
August 27	Austin Peay	Western Kentucky	Houchens Industries–L. T. Smith Stadium • Bowling Green, KY	W 38–27
September 1	Bryant	FIU	Riccardo Silva Stadium • Miami, FL	W 38–37 ^{OT}
September 1	Alabama A&M	UAB	Protective Stadium • Birmingham, AL	W 59–0
September 2	William & Mary	Charlotte	Jerry Richardson Stadium • Charlotte, NC	L 24–41
September 10	No. 21 (FCS) Southeastern Louisiana	Florida Atlantic	FAU Stadium • Boca Raton, FL	W 42–9
September 10	Stephen F. Austin	Louisiana Tech	Joe Aillet Stadium • Ruston, LA	W 52–17
September 10	Texas Southern	North Texas	Apogee Stadium • Denton, TX	W 59–27
September 10	McNeese	Rice	Rice Stadium • Houston, TX	W 52–10
September 17	Tennessee State	Middle Tennessee	Johnny "Red" Floyd Stadium • Murfreesboro, TN	W 49–6
September 24	Texas Southern	UTSA	Alamodome • San Antonio, TX	W 52–24

== Awards and honors ==
=== Player of the week honors ===
Week	Offensive			Defensive			Special Teams		
Week	Player	Team	Position	Player	Team	Position	Player	Team	Position
Week 0 (August 29)	Austin Aune	North Texas	QB	Justin McKithen	Florida Atlantic	CB	Morgan Suarez	Florida Atlantic	K
Week 1 (September 5)	Frank Harris	UTSA	QB	Kaleb Oliver	Western Kentucky	S	Jared Sackett	UTSA	K
Week 2 (September 12)	Frank Harris (2)	UTSA	QB	Quindarius Dunnigan	Middle Tennessee	DL	Gavin Baechle	UTEP	K
Week 3 (September 19)	DeWayne McBride	UAB	RB	Noah Wilder	UAB	LB	Kaylon Horton	North Texas	KR
Week 4 (September 26)	Chase Cunningham	Middle Tennessee	QB	Zaylin Wood	Middle Tennessee	DL	Marcus Bellon	UTEP	PR
Week 5 (October 3)	Frank Harris (3)	UTSA	QB	Ridge Texada	North Texas	DB	Gavin Baechle (2)	UTEP	K
Week 6 (October 10)	Trea Shropshire	UAB	WR	Myles Brooks	Louisiana Tech	DB	Jared Sackett (2)	UTSA	K
Week 7 (October 17)	Dylan Hopkins	UAB	QB	KD Davis	North Texas	LB	Tom Ellard	Western Kentucky	P
Week 8 (October 24)	Frank Harris (4)	UTSA	QB	Kahlef Hailassie	Western Kentucky	DB	Gavin Baechle (3)	UTEP	K
Week 9 (October 31)	Chris Reynolds	Charlotte	QB	Logan Wilson	North Texas	DB	Shadrick Byrd	Charlotte	KR
Week 10 (November 7)	Austin Reed	Western Kentucky	QB	Myles Brooks (2)	Louisiana Tech	DB	Jared Sackett (3)	UTSA	K
Week 11 (November 14)	DeWayne McBride (2)	UAB	RB	Devodric Bynum	UAB	DB	Jaylen Hall	Western Kentucky	PR
Week 12 (November 21)	Chase Cunningham (2)	Middle Tennessee	QB	Teldrick Ross	Middle Tennessee	DB	Jared Sackett (4)	UTSA	K
Week 13 (November 28)	DeWayne McBride (3)	UAB	RB	Jakobe Thomas	Middle Tennessee	DB	Jared Sackett (5)	UTSA	K

=== Conference USA Individual Awards ===
The following individuals received postseason honors as chosen by the league's head coaches.

Award	Player	School
Most Valuable Player	Frank Harris, QB	UTSA
Offensive Player of the Year	DeWayne McBride, RB	UAB
Defensive Player of the Year	KD Davis, LB	North Texas
Special Teams Player of the Year	Gavin Baechle, PK	UTEP
Freshman of the Year	Kevorian Barnes, RB	UTSA
Newcomer of the Year	Austin Reed, QB	Western Kentucky
Coach of the Year	Jeff Traylor	UTSA

=== All-Conference Teams ===
The following list contains players selected as members of the 2022 All-Conference Teams.

Position	Player	Team
First Team Offense
WR	Zakhari Franklin	UTSA
WR	Malachi Corley	Western Kentucky
WR	Tre Harris	Louisiana Tech
OL	Ahofitu Maka	UTSA
OL	Manase Mose	North Texas
OL	Jeremiah Byers	UTEP
OL	Sidney Wells	UAB
OL	Kadeem Telfort	UAB
TE	Var'Keyes Gumms	North Texas
QB	Frank Harris	UTSA
RB	DeWayne McBride	UAB
RB	Larry McCammon III	Florida Atlantic
First Team Defense
DE	Jadrian Taylor	UTEP
DE	Jordan Ferguson	Middle Tennessee
DT	Brandon Brown	UTSA
DT	Keivie Rose	Louisiana Tech
LB	KD Davis	North Texas
LB	Noah Wilder	UAB
LB	JaQues Evans	Western Kentucky
DB	Clifford Chattman	UTSA
DB	Corey Mayfield Jr.	UTSA
DB	Ridge Texada	North Texas
DB	Starling Thomas V	UAB
First Team Special Teams
K	Gavin Baechle	UTEP
P	Kyle Ulbrich	Middle Tennessee
LS	Brody Butler	Middle Tennessee
KR	Kaylon Horton	North Texas
PR	Smoke Harris	Louisiana Tech

Position	Player	Team
Second Team Offense
WR	De'Corian Clark	UTSA
WR	Joshua Cephus	UTSA
WR	Grant DuBose	Charlotte
OL	Will Rykard	UAB
OL	Shea Baker	Rice
OL	Brendan Bordner	Florida Atlantic
OL	Gunner Britton	Western Kentucky
OL	Quincy McGee	UAB
TE	Joshua Simon	Western Kentucky
QB	Austin Reed	Western Kentucky
RB	Jermaine Brown Jr.	UAB
RB	Deion Hankins	UTEP
Second Team Defense
DE	Praise Amaewhule	UTEP
DE	Amir Siddiq	Charlotte
DT	Fish McWilliams	UAB
DT	Evan Anderson	Florida Atlantic
LB	Mazin Richards	North Texas
LB	Jamal Ligon	UTSA
LB	Tyrice Knight	UTEP
DB	Teldrick Ross	Middle Tennessee
DB	Grayson Cash	UAB
DB	Kahlef Hailassie	Western Kentucky
DB	Myles Brooks	Louisiana Tech
Second Team Special Teams
K	Jared Sackett	UTSA
P	Lucas Dean	UTSA
LS	Angelo Tejada	UTEP
KR	Smoke Harris	Louisiana Tech
PR	Jaylin Lane	Middle Tennessee

* Denotes Unanimous Selection

All Conference Honorable Mentions:

=== All-Americans ===
The 2022 College Football All-America Team is composed of the following College Football All-American first teams chosen by the following selector organizations: Associated Press (AP), Football Writers Association of America (FWAA), American Football Coaches Association (AFCA), Walter Camp Foundation (WCFF), The Sporting News (TSN), Sports Illustrated (SI), USA Today (USAT) ESPN, CBS Sports (CBS), FOX Sports (FOX) College Football News (CFN), Bleacher Report (BR), Scout.com, Phil Steele (PS), SB Nation (SB), Athlon Sports, Pro Football Focus (PFF) and Yahoo! Sports (Yahoo!).

Currently, the NCAA compiles consensus all-America teams using a point system computed from All-America teams named by coaches associations or media sources. Players are chosen against other players playing at their position only. To be selected a consensus All-American, players must be chosen to the first team on at least half of the five official selectors as recognized by the NCAA. Second- and third-team honors are used to break ties. Players named first-team by all five selectors are deemed unanimous All-Americans. Currently, the NCAA recognizes All-Americans selected by the AP, AFCA, FWAA, TSN, and the WCFF to determine consensus and unanimous All-Americans.

Position	Player	School	Selector	Unanimous	Consensus
First Team All-Americans
			()		

Position	Player	School	Selector
Second Team All-Americans
			()

== NFL draft ==
The following list includes all C-USA players who were drafted in the 2023 NFL draft.

Player	Position	School	Draft Round	Round Pick	Overall Pick	Team
Brodric Martin	DT	Western Kentucky	3	33	96	Detroit Lions
DeWayne McBride	RB	UAB	7	5	222	Minnesota Vikings
Grant DuBose	WR	Charlotte	7	39	256	Green Bay Packers
