= K. D. Davis =

American football player (born 2000)

Profile
- Position: Linebacker

Personal information
- Born: February 22, 2000 (age 26)
- Listed height: 6 ft 0 in (1.83 m)
- Listed weight: 229 lb (104 kg)

Career information
- High school: Ennis (Ennis, Texas)
- College: North Texas
- NFL draft: 2023: undrafted

Career history
- Saskatchewan Roughriders (2024)*; Montreal Alouettes (2024–2025)
- * Offseason or practice squad member only

Awards and highlights
- CUSA Defensive Player of the Year (2022); 2× First-team All-CUSA (2021–2022)
- Stats at CFL.ca

K. D. Davis (born February 22, 2000) is an American professional football linebacker. He played college football at the University of North Texas, where he is the school's all-time leader in tackles.

== Early life ==
K. D. Davis was born on February 22, 2000. He played high school football at Ennis High School in Ennis, Texas. He posted 63 tackles, one sack, three forced fumbles, and two fumble recoveries his junior year in 2016. As a senior safety in 2017, Davis recorded 97 tackles, four interceptions, and two forced fumbles, earning District 17-5A Defensive Player of the Year honors.

== College career ==
Davis played college football for the North Texas Mean Green of the University of North Texas as a linebacker. He played in all 13 games (mostly on special teams) as a true freshman in 2018, posting three solo tackles and two assisted tackles. He appeared in all 12 games, starting 11, during the 2019 season, leading the team in tackles while recording 37 solo tackles, 51 assisted tackles, 3.5 sacks, two fumble recoveries, and one pass breakup. For his performance during the 2019 season, Davis earned honorable mention All-Conference USA (CUSA) honors. He played in nine games (all starts) during the COVID-19 shortened 2020 season, leading the team in tackles for the second straight year while totaling 37 solo tackles, 38 assisted tackles, and three sacks. He was named honorable mention All-CUSA for the second consecutive year. Davis started all 13 games at middle linebacker in 2021, recording 51 solo tackles, 70 assisted tackles, 5.5 sacks, one pass breakup, and two fumble recoveries (one of which was recovered for a touchdown). He was the first North Texas player since Zach Orr to lead the team in tackles for three straight season. Davis' 70 assisted tackles were also the most in Conference USA. He was named first-team All-CUSA by the coaches for the 2021 season.

On June 23, 2022, Davis entered the NCAA transfer portal. He visited Ole Miss and Texas A&M. However, by June 27, he had withdrawn his name from the portal in order to come back to North Texas and attempt to set the school's career tackles record. Davis started all 14 games in 2022, leading the Mean Green in tackles for the fourth consecutive year with 72 solo tackles, 67 assisted tackles, one sack, one forced fumble, and one pass breakup. His solo tackle and assisted tackle totals were both the most in CUSA that year. He garnered CUSA Defensive Player of the Year, first-team All-CUSA, and Phil Steele fourth-team All-American recognition for the 2022 season. Davis suffered a torn ACL in the 2022 Frisco Bowl. He ended his college career with a school record 428 tackles, breaking the mark of 418 previously held by Byron Gross, who played from 1987 to 1990.

== Professional career ==
=== Saskatchewan Roughriders ===
Davis went undrafted in the 2023 NFL draft. He signed with the Saskatchewan Roughriders of the Canadian Football League (CFL) on January 18, 2024. He was released on May 22, 2024.

=== Montreal Alouettes ===
Davis was signed to the practice roster of the CFL's Montreal Alouettes on June 18, 2024. He was promoted to the active roster on July 2, moved to the practice roster on July 4, promoted to the active roster again on July 9, moved back to the practice roster on July 23, promoted to the active roster for the third time on August 20, and moved to the practice roster for the fourth time on September 4, 2024. He dressed in two games overall during the 2024 season, posting one tackle on defense and one tackle on special teams.

Davis re-signed with Montreal on November 18, 2024. He was moved to the practice roster on June 1, 2025, active roster on June 9, practice roster on June 16, active roster on July 1, one-game injured list on July 23, active roster on August 1, one-game injured list on August 7, and practice roster on August 12, 2025. He was released on September 16 but later re-signed to the practice roster on October 28, 2025. Davis became a free agent after the 2025 season.
