= 2022 LendingTree Bowl =

Postseason college football bowl game

- 24th LendingTree Bowl
Rice Owls	Southern Miss Golden Eagles
(5–7)	(6–6)
C–USA	Sun Belt
24	38
Head coach: Mike Bloomgren	Head coach: Will Hall
	1	2	3	4	Total
Rice	0	3	21	0	24
Southern Miss	7	10	7	14	38
- Date: December 17, 2022
- Season: 2022
- Stadium: Hancock Whitney Stadium
- Location: Mobile, Alabama
- MVP: Frank Gore Jr. (RB, Southern Miss)
- Favorite: Southern Miss by 6.5
- Referee: David Siegle (MAC)
- Attendance: 20,512
- Payout: US$1,500,000

United States TV coverage
- Network: ESPN
- Announcers: Mike Monaco (play-by-play), Matt Stinchcomb (analyst), and Alyssa Lang (sideline)

The 2022 LendingTree Bowl was a college football bowl game played on December 17, 2022, at Hancock Whitney Stadium in Mobile, Alabama. The 24th annual LendingTree Bowl, the game featured Southern Miss from the Sun Belt Conference and Rice from Conference USA (C-USA). The game began at 4:50 p.m. CST and aired on ESPN. It was one of the 2022–23 bowl games concluding the 2022 FBS football season. The game's title sponsor was online lending marketplace LendingTree.

== Teams ==
Based on conference tie-ins, the game usually features teams from the Mid-American Conference and the Sun Belt Conference; however, the matchup for this edition features a team from Conference USA. This will be the thirteenth meeting between Rice and Southern Miss, with the all-time series currently tied at six wins each. From 2005 to 2021, the Owls and Golden Eagles played together as members of Conference USA.

This will be the Owls' first LendingTree Bowl, as well as their first bowl game appearance since the 2014 Hawaii Bowl, where they defeated Fresno State by a score of 30–6. The Golden Eagles will make their third appearance in the LendingTree Bowl, though their first under its current name; they defeated TCU in the 2000 Mobile Alabama Bowl and beat Ohio in the 2007 GMAC Bowl. Their last bowl game appearance came in 2019, when they played Tulane in the Armed Forces Bowl.

=== Rice ===
The Rice Owls, representing Conference USA (C–USA), began Mike Bloomgren's fifth year as head coach with a road trip to Los Angeles and a game at No. 14 USC, which resulted in a 52-point loss. They defeated FCS McNeese State by 42 points in their home opener and followed that up with an 11-point defeat of Louisiana the next weekend. They were defeated by crosstown rivals Houston by a touchdown to conclude their non-conference schedule, and began C–USA play on October 1 with a home victory against UAB. The Owls' first conference loss came following a bye week, as they traveled to play Florida Atlantic and fell by three points. A one-point overtime win over Louisiana Tech and a poor showing against Charlotte, resulting in a 33-point loss, took Rice into November with a 4–4 record. After beating UTEP at home by virtue of a late-game touchdown, the Owls traveled to face Western Kentucky, to whom they lost by five touchdowns. Rice suffered a similar result in their final home game, against UTSA, which they lost by 41 points. Their last regular-season game played out to a four-point defeat to North Texas, a game that sent the Mean Green to the conference championship game.

Rice finished their regular season with an overall record of 5–7 and a 3–5 mark in conference play. Under normal circumstances, this means that Rice would not be eligible for a bowl; however, due to an insufficient number of standard bowl-eligible teams, Academic Progress Rate (APR) is used as a tiebreaker. Rice, having the highest APR among 5–7 teams, became bowl eligible and accepted their bid to the LendingTree Bowl on December 4.

This was Rice's final game as a member of C–USA, as the Owls committed to join the American Athletic Conference in 2023.

=== Southern Miss ===
The Southern Miss Golden Eagles, previously members of Conference USA, represented the Sun Belt Conference for the first time effective July 1, 2022. Their second season under head coach Will Hall began with a home game against Liberty, which went to four overtimes before the Flames earned a two-point victory. A second loss followed as the Golden Eagles were bested by No. 15 Miami (FL), 30–7. They earned their first win of the season with a dominant showing against FCS Northwestern State, and defeated Tulane on the road with the help of a fourth quarter pick-six the next week. After a bye week, Southern Miss traveled to Troy, losing by 17 points, before returning for homecoming and beating Arkansas State by one point. This was the start of a three-game winning streak that went through the end of October and included further victories over Texas State, by six points, and Louisiana, by fifteen. November started much worse for the Golden Eagles, however, as they dropped a home game to Georgia State before a road trip to Coastal Carolina ended in a three-point loss. Southern Miss's losing skid extended to three games as they faltered in their home finale against South Alabama. Needing a win in their final game against Louisiana–Monroe to achieve bowl eligibility, the Golden Eagles defeated the Warhawks by ten points to finish the regular season with an overall record of 6–6 and a Sun Belt record of 4–4.

== Game summary ==
The game's officiating crew, representing the Mid-American Conference, was led by referee David Siegle and umpire Ryan McClellan.

2022 LendingTree Bowl

Quarter	1	2	3	4	Total
Rice	0	3	21	0	24
Southern Miss	7	10	7	14	38

at Hancock Whitney Stadium • Mobile, Alabama

- Date: Saturday, December 17, 2022
- Game time: 4:45 p.m. CST
- Game weather: Cloudy • Temperature: 47 °F (8 °C) • Wind: 6 mph (9.7 km/h) north
- Game attendance: 20,512
- Referee: David Siegle
- TV announcers (ESPN): Mike Monaco (play-by-play), Matt Stinchcomb (analyst), and Alyssa Lang (sideline)
- Box score

Scoring summary

Quarter	Time	Drive			Team	Scoring information	Score	
Quarter	Time	Plays	Yards	TOP	Team	Scoring information	Rice	Southern Miss
1	12:20	6	75	2:40	Southern Miss	Jakarius Caston 19-yard touchdown reception from Trey Lowe III, Briggs Bourgeois kick good	0	7
2	10:14	1	59	0:36	Southern Miss	Frank Gore Jr. 59-yard touchdown run, Briggs Bourgeois kick good	0	14
2	6:04	8	59	4:10	Rice	59-yard field goal by Christian VanSickle	3	14
2	2:40	8	75	3:24	Southern Miss	18-yard field goal by Briggs Bourgeois	3	17
3	11:12	7	80	3:48	Rice	Isaiah Esdale 26-yard touchdown reception from AJ Padgett, Christian VanSickle kick good	10	17
3	10:08	1	32	0:05	Rice	Isaiah Esdale 32-yard touchdown reception from AJ Padgett, Christian VanSickle kick good	17	17
3	5:06	5	88	2:00	Rice	Bradley Rozner 18-yard touchdown reception from AJ Padgett, Christian VanSickle kick good	24	17
3	3:52	4	67	1:14	Southern Miss	Tiaquelin Mims 18-yard touchdown reception from Frank Gore Jr., Briggs Bourgeois kick good	24	24
4	14:18	5	98	2:04	Southern Miss	Jason Brownlee 26-yard touchdown reception from Trey Lowe III, Briggs Bourgeois kick good	24	31
4	2:57	1	55	0:13	Southern Miss	Frank Gore Jr. 55-yard touchdown run, Briggs Bourgeois kick good	24	38
"TOP" = time of possession. For other American football terms, see Glossary of American football.							24	38

== Statistics ==
Team statistical comparison
Statistic	Rice	Southern Miss
First downs	21	22
First downs rushing	7	13
First downs passing	13	7
First downs penalty	1	2
Third down efficiency	5–15	2–9
Fourth down efficiency	0–2	0–0
Total plays–net yards	70–425	57–550
Rushing attempts–net yards	31–122	38–361
Yards per rush	3.9	9.5
Yards passing	303	189
Pass completions–attempts	20–39	9–19
Interceptions thrown	1	0
Punt returns–total yards	1–2	2–12
Kickoff returns–total yards	2–29	4–97
Punts–average yardage	7–38.7	4–42.5
Fumbles–lost	1–1	3–3
Penalties–yards	9–57	6–55
Time of possession	32:38	27:22

Rice statistics
Owls passing
	C–A	Yds	TD–INT
AJ Padgett	19–37	295	3–0
Shawqi Itraish	1–2	8	0–1
Owls rushing
	Car	Yds	TD
Cameron Montgomery	7	63	0
Braylen Walker	1	20	0
Quinton Jackson	3	15	0
Juma Otoviano	6	12	0
Luke McCaffrey	1	11	0
Uriah West	2	5	0
Isaiah Esdale	1	2	0
AJ Pedgett	10	−6	0
Owls receiving
	Rec	Yds	TD
Isaiah Esdale	3	83	2
Luke McCaffrey	7	67	0
Quinton Jackson	2	54	0
Bradley Rozner	3	42	1
Boden Groen	3	29	0
Jack Bradley	1	25	0
Juma Otoviano	1	3	0

Southern Miss statistics
Golden Eagles passing
	C–A	Yds	TD–INT
Trey Lowe	7–16	170	2–0
Frank Gore Jr.	2–3	19	1–0
Golden Eagles rushing
	Car	Yds	TD
Frank Gore Jr.	21	329	2
Janari Dean	4	12	0
Jakarius Caston	1	9	0
Trey Lowe	6	7	0
Kenyon Clay	4	7	0
TEAM	1	−1	0
Antavious Willis	1	−2	0
Golden Eagles receiving
	Rec	Yds	TD
Jakarius Caston	4	94	1
Jason Brownlee	3	72	1
Tiaquelin Mims	1	18	1
Latreal Jones	1	5	0
