= Frank Gore Jr. =

American football player (born 2002)

No. 20 – Buffalo Bills
- Position: Running back
- Roster status: Active Roster

Personal information
- Born: March 13, 2002 (age 24); Miami, Florida, U.S.
- Listed height: 5 ft 8 in (1.73 m)
- Listed weight: 201 lb (91 kg)

Career information
- High school: Miami Killian (FL)
- College: Southern Miss (2020–2023)
- NFL draft: 2024: undrafted

Career history
- Buffalo Bills (2024–present)

Awards and highlights
- First-team All-Sun Belt (2022); 2× Second-team All-Sun Belt (2020, 2023)

Career NFL statistics as of Week 2, 2026
- Rushing yards: 3
- Stats at Pro Football Reference

Franklin Gore Jr. (born March 13, 2002) is an American professional football running back for the Buffalo Bills of the National Football League (NFL). He played college football for the Southern Miss Golden Eagles and was signed by the Bills in 2024 as an undrafted free agent. He is the son of former NFL running back Frank Gore.

== Early life ==
The son of former NFL player Frank Gore, he was born on March 13, 2002, in Miami, Florida. Gore Jr. attended and played high school football at Miami Killian Senior High School. He played quarterback and running back. As a rusher, Gore compiled 1,111 yards and thirteen touchdowns on 113 carries in his senior year.

== College career ==
Though originally committing to Florida Atlantic, Gore flipped his commitment to Southern Miss. As a true freshman, he led the school with 708 rushing yards on 121 carries, a 5.9 average. He posted three 100-yard games, against North Texas, North Alabama, and Florida Atlantic. He scored a 51-yard rushing touchdown in a 20–23 loss against UTSA. He was named second-team all-conference following the season, as well as all-freshman. Through the first ten games of his second season, Gore compiled 731 rushing yards on 162 carries, scoring two touchdowns. He was named quarterback prior to a week eleven game against Louisiana Tech, and threw two touchdowns, leading the team to their second victory of the season. In the 2022 LendingTree Bowl against Rice, Gore rushed for 329 yards, an FBS bowl game record. He also scored three touchdowns in the game, two rushing and one passing.

Gore was named the offensive MVP of the 2024 edition of the East–West Shrine Bowl.

=== Statistics ===
Season	Team	Games			Rushing				Receiving				Passing							
Season	Team	GP	GS	Record (Note: Accounts for only GS as a QB)	Att	Yds	Avg	TD	Rec	Yds	Avg	TD	Cmp	Att	Pct	Yds	Avg	TD	Int	Rate
2020	Southern Miss	10	6	—	121	708	5.9	2	9	97	10.8	1	—	—	—	—	—	—	—	—
2021	Southern Miss	12	12	2–1	179	801	4.5	5	20	155	7.8	0	10	16	62.5	189	11.8	4	1	231.7
2022	Southern Miss	13	13	—	228	1,382	6.1	9	19	219	11.5	0	7	14	50.0	179	12.8	3	0	228.1
2023	Southern Miss	12	12	—	231	1,131	4.9	10	27	221	8.2	3	0	5	0.0	0	0.0	0	0	0.0
Career		47	43	2–1	759	4,022	5.3	26	75	692	9.2	4	17	35	48.6	368	10.5	7	1	197.2

== Professional career ==
Pre-draft measurables
Height	Weight	Arm length	Hand span	Wingspan	40-yard dash	10-yard split	20-yard split	Vertical jump	Broad jump	Bench press
5 ft 7 5/8 in (1.72 m)	201 lb (91 kg)	29 5/8 in (0.75 m)	8 1/4 in (0.21 m)	5 ft 10 5/8 in (1.79 m)	4.69 s	1.64 s	2.66 s	29.0 in (0.74 m)	9 ft 3 in (2.82 m)	18 reps
All values from NFL Combine/Pro Day

Gore went undrafted in the 2024 NFL draft, and signed with the Buffalo Bills as an undrafted free agent. On August 27, 2024, he was released and re-signed to the practice squad the following day.

Gore signed a reserve/future contract with Buffalo on January 27, 2025. On August 26, Gore was released by the Bills as part of final roster cuts; he was re-signed to the team's practice squad the following day. Gore was called up to the active roster on January 11, 2026, for the Bills' Wild Card Round playoff game against the Jacksonville Jaguars, following an injury to Ty Johnson. He caught one pass from Josh Allen for six yards and no carries in limited action during his postseason debut.

On January 19, 2026, Gore signed another reserve/futures contract with the Bills. Gore was waived by Buffalo on August 30 as a part of final roster cuts; he was re-signed to the team's practice squad the next day. Gore was elevated to the active roster for the first two games of the regular season and saw playing time as the team's third running back and fullback.
