= 2022 Southern Miss Golden Eagles football team =

American college football season

2022 Southern Miss Golden Eagles football

LendingTree Bowl champion

LendingTree Bowl, W 38–24 vs. Rice
- Conference: Sun Belt Conference
- West Division
- Record: 7–6 (4–4 Sun Belt)
- Head coach: Will Hall (2nd season)
- Offensive coordinator: Sam Gregg (2nd season)
- Offensive scheme: Multiple
- Defensive coordinator: Austin Armstrong (2nd season)
- Base defense: 3–3–5
- Home stadium: M. M. Roberts Stadium

2022 Sun Belt Conference football standings
	Conf.			Overall
Team	W		L	W		L
East Division
James Madison* x	6	–	2	8	–	3
Coastal Carolina xy	6	–	2	9	–	4
Marshall	5	–	3	9	–	4
Georgia Southern	3	–	5	6	–	7
Appalachian State	3	–	5	6	–	6
Georgia State	3	–	5	4	–	8
Old Dominion	2	–	6	3	–	9
West Division
No. 19 Troy xy$	7	–	1	12	–	2
South Alabama x	7	–	1	10	–	3
Southern Miss	4	–	4	7	–	6
Louisiana	4	–	4	6	–	7
Louisiana–Monroe	3	–	5	4	–	8
Texas State	2	–	6	4	–	8
Arkansas State	1	–	7	3	–	9
Championship: Troy 45, Coastal Carolina 26
$ – Conference champion; x – Division champion/co-champions; y – Championship game participant; * – Ineligible for postseason play due to FCS-to-FBS transition rules; Rankings from AP Poll

The 2022 Southern Miss Golden Eagles football team represented the University of Southern Mississippi as a new member of the Sun Belt Conference during the 2022 NCAA Division I FBS football season. They were led by head coach Will Hall, who was coaching his second season with the team. The Golden Eagles played their home games at M. M. Roberts Stadium in Hattiesburg, Mississippi.

== Preseason ==
=== Sun Belt coaches poll ===
The Sun Belt coaches poll was released on July 25, 2022. The Golden Eagles were picked to finish fifth in the West Division.

=== Sun Belt Preseason All-Conference teams ===
Special teams

2nd team

- Camron harrell – Right Safety, SR

== Schedule ==
Southern Miss and the Sun Belt Conference announced the 2022 football schedule on March 1, 2022.

Date	Time	Opponent	Site	TV	Result	Attendance
September 3	6:00 p.m.	Liberty*	M. M. Roberts Stadium; Hattiesburg, MS	ESPN+	L 27–29 ^{4OT}	24,051
September 10	11:00 a.m.	at No. 15 Miami (FL)*	Hard Rock Stadium; Miami Gardens, FL	ACCN	L 7–30	46,422
September 17	6:00 p.m.	Northwestern State*	M. M. Roberts Stadium; Hattiesburg, MS	ESPN3	W 64–10	26,202
September 24	6:00 p.m.	at Tulane*	Yulman Stadium; New Orleans, LA (Battle for the Bell)	ESPN+	W 27–24	20,422
October 8	6:00 p.m.	at Troy	Veterans Memorial Stadium; Troy, AL	ESPN+	L 10–27	26,017
October 15	6:00 p.m.	Arkansas State^{†}	M. M. Roberts Stadium; Hattiesburg, MS	ESPN+	W 20–19	27,042
October 22	4:00 p.m.	at Texas State	Bobcat Stadium; San Marcos, TX	ESPN+	W 20–14	16,318
October 27	6:30 p.m.	Louisiana	M. M. Roberts Stadium; Hattiesburg, MS	ESPN2	W 39–24	27,332
November 5	2:00 p.m.	Georgia State	M. M. Roberts Stadium; Hattiesburg, MS	ESPN+	L 14–42	22,128
November 12	6:30 p.m.	at Coastal Carolina	Brooks Stadium; Conway, SC	ESPNU	L 23–26	16,203
November 19	2:30 p.m.	South Alabama	M. M. Roberts Stadium; Hattiesburg, MS	NFLN	L 20–27	24,032
November 26	4:00 p.m.	at Louisiana–Monroe	Malone Stadium; Monroe, LA	ESPN+	W 20–10	4,465
December 17	4:45 p.m.	vs. Rice*	Hancock Whitney Stadium; Mobile, AL (LendingTree Bowl)	ESPN	W 38–24	20,512
*Non-conference game; ^{†}Homecoming; Rankings from AP Poll (and CFP Rankings, after November 1) - Released prior to game; All times are in Central time

== Game summaries ==
=== Liberty ===
	1	2	3	4	OT	2OT	3OT	4OT	Total
Flames	0	10	0	14	0	3	0	2	29
Golden Eagles	0	3	7	14	0	3	0	0	27

Statistics

Statistics	LIB	USM
First downs	23	19
Total yards	447	389
Rushing yards	244	252
Passing yards	203	137
Turnovers	3	5
Time of possession	29:06	30:54

Team	Category	Player	Statistics
Liberty	Passing	Kaidon Salter	8/13, 148 yards, 2 TD, INT
Liberty	Rushing	Kaidon Salter	9 rushes, 65 yards
Liberty	Receiving	DeMario Douglas	5 receptions, 97 yards, 2 TD
Southern Miss	Passing	Ty Keyes	4/8, 89 yards, 2 INT
Southern Miss	Rushing	Frank Gore Jr.	32 rushes, 178 yards, 2 TD
Southern Miss	Receiving	Jakarius Caston	2 receptions, 54 yards

=== At No. 15 Miami (FL) ===
Game Two – Southern Miss Golden Eagles (0–1) at #15 Miami Hurricanes (1–0)

Quarter	1	2	3	4	Total
Golden Eagles	0	7	0	0	7
No. 15 Hurricanes	3	7	14	6	30

at Hard Rock Stadium • Miami Gardens, Florida

- Date: Saturday, September 10, 2022
- Game time: 12:00 p.m. EST
- Game weather: Sunny • Temperature: 85 °F (29 °C)
- TV announcers (ACCN): Chris Cotter (play-by-play), Mark Herzlich (analyst), & Lericia Harris (sideline)

Game information

First quarter

- (1:39) MIA – Andres Borregales 30-yard field goal (Drive: 16 plays, 68 yards, 6:14; Miami 3–0)

Second quarter

- (14:30) USM – Jason Brownlee 32-yard pass from Zach Wilcke, Briggs Bourgeois kick (Drive: 6 plays, 75 yards, 2:09; Southern Miss 7–3)
- (0:20) MIA – Henry Parrish Jr. 1-yard run, Andres Borregales kick (Drive: 10 plays, 86 yards, 2:52; Miami 10–7)

Third quarter

- (7:10) MIA – Thaddius Franklin Jr. 7-yard run, Andres Borregales kick (Drive: 13 plays, 77 yards, 6:11; Miami 17–7)
- (4:56) MIA – Key'Shawn Smith 35-yard pass from Tyler Van Dyke, Andres Borregales kick (Drive: 1 play, 35 yards, 0:06; Miami 24–7)

Fourth quarter

- (9:11) MIA – Andres Borregales 33-yard field goal (Drive: 12 plays, 44 yards, 5:30; Miami 27–7)
- (3:34) MIA – Andres Borregales 48-yard field goal (Drive: 7 plays, 14 yards, 3:50; Miami 30–7)

Statistics	USM	MIA
First downs	12	23
Plays–yards	50–240	78–451
Rushes–yards	24–33	49–173
Passing yards	207	278
Passing: comp–att–int	16–27–1	23–32–1
Time of possession	23:00	37:00

Team	Category	Player	Statistics
Southern Miss	Passing	Zach Wilcke	16/27, 207 yards, TD, INT
Southern Miss	Rushing	Zach Wilcke	12 carries, 29 yards
Southern Miss	Receiving	Jason Brownlee	5 receptions, 102 yards, TD
Miami	Passing	Tyler Van Dyke	21/30, 263 yards, TD, INT
Miami	Rushing	Henry Parrish Jr.	24 carries, 116 yards, TD
Miami	Receiving	Xavier Restrepo	6 receptions, 72 yards

=== Northwestern State ===
	1	2	3	4	Total
Demons	0	0	10	0	10
Golden Eagles	13	28	16	7	64

=== At Tulane ===
Southern Miss Golden Eagles (2–1) vs Tulane Green Wave (3–0) – Game summary

Quarter	1	2	3	4	Total
Golden Eagles	0	10	7	10	27
Green Wave	7	10	0	7	24

at Yulman Stadium • New Orleans, LA

- Date: September 24, 2022
- Game time: 6:00 p.m.
- Game weather: Sunny, 81 °F (27 °C)
- Game attendance: 20,422
- Referee: Kevin Randall
- TV announcers (ESPN+): Jack Benjamin (play-by-play), Brian Kinchen (analyst)

Game information

First quarter

- (10:14) TUL – Tyjae Spears 8-yard run, Kriston Esnard kick (Drive: 7 plays, 62 yards, 2:43; Tulane 7–0)

Second quarter

- (11:57) TUL – Tyjae Spears 34-yard run, Kriston Esnard kick (Drive: 6 plays, 87 yards, 3:03; Tulane 14–0)
- (6:01) USM – Jason Brownlee 23-yard pass from Zach Wilcke, Briggs Bourgeois kick (Drive: 5 plays, 44 yards, 1:45; Tulane 14–7)
- (2:31) USM – Briggs Bourgeois 36-yard field goal (Drive: 4 plays, 6 yards, 2:03; Tulane 14–10)
- (0:03) TUL – Kriston Esnard 28-yard field goal (Drive: 10 plays, 64 yards, 2:28; Tulane 17–10)

Third quarter

- (1:53) USM – Jakarius Caston 37-yard pass from Zach Wilcke, Briggs Bourgeois kick (Drive: 7 plays, 70 yards, 3:06; Tied 17–17)

Fourth quarter

- (8:26) USM – Briggs Bourgeois 26-yard field goal (Drive: 7 plays, 49 yards, 2:50; Southern Miss 20–17)
- (7:07) USM – Eric Scott Jr. 35-yard interception return, Briggs Bourgeois kick (Drive: 3 plays, 4 yards, 1:19; Southern Miss 27–17)
- (0:19) TUL – Jha'Quan Jackson 25-yard pass from Michael Pratt, Kriston Esnard kick (Drive: 4 plays, 72 yards, 0:37; Southern Miss 27–24)

Statistics	USM	TUL
First downs	13	26
Total yards	253	451
Rushes/yards	27–59	47–204
Passing yards	194	247
Passing: Comp–Att–Int	17–25–0	19–29–1
Time of possession	23:59	36:01

Team	Category	Player	Statistics
Southern Miss	Passing	Zach Wilcke	17/25, 194 yards, 2 TD
Southern Miss	Rushing	Frank Gore Jr.	16 carries, 44 yards
Southern Miss	Receiving	Jakarius Caston	8 receptions, 91 yards, TD
Tulane	Passing	Michael Pratt	19/29, 247 yards, TD, INT
Tulane	Rushing	Tyjae Spears	22 carries, 114 yards, 2 TD
Tulane	Receiving	Tyjae Spears	5 receptions, 74 yards

=== At Troy ===
	1	2	3	4	Total
Golden Eagles	0	7	3	0	10
Trojans	3	7	7	10	27

=== Arkansas State ===
	1	2	3	4	Total
Red Wolves	7	3	9	0	19
Golden Eagles	0	7	0	13	20

=== At Texas State ===
	1	2	3	4	Total
Golden Eagles	3	10	0	7	20
Bobcats	0	7	0	7	14

Statistics	USM	TXST
First downs	17	12
Total yards	318	243
Rushing yards	131	-6
Passing yards	187	249
Turnovers	3	1
Time of possession	34:10	25:50

Team	Category	Player	Statistics
Southern Miss	Passing	Zach Wilcke	18/25, 187 yards, TD, 2 INT
Southern Miss	Rushing	Frank Gore Jr.	20 rushes, 91 yards
Southern Miss	Receiving	Chandler Pittman	1 reception, 53 yards, TD
Texas State	Passing	Layne Hatcher	26/42, 249 yards, 2 TD, INT
Texas State	Rushing	Calvin Hill	3 rushes, 3 yards
Texas State	Receiving	Ashtyn Hawkins	5 receptions, 102 yards, TD

=== Louisiana ===
Louisiana at Southern Mississippi

Team	1	2	3	4	Total
Ragin' Cajuns	5	6	6	7	24
• Golden Eagles	20	9	0	10	39

- Date: October 27, 2022
- Location: M. M. Roberts Stadium
  Hattiesburg, Mississippi
- Game start: 6:35 p.m. CDT
- Elapsed time: 3 hours and 46 minutes
- Game attendance: 27,332
- Game weather: 68 °F (20 °C) • Weather: Sunny • Wind: NE 4 MPH
- Referee: Wayne Winkler
- TV announcers (ESPN2): Mike Couzens (play–by–play) and Charles Arbuckle (analyst)

Scoring summary
1	07:29	USM	Janari Dean 1-yard rush (Briggs Bourgeois PAT blocked) (5 plays, 19 yards, 2:29)	USM 6–0
1	07:28	LA	Trey Amos Defensive PAT conversion (0 plays, 0 yards, 0:00)	USM 6–2
1	04:34	USM	Tiaquelin Mims 52-yard pass from Frank Gore, Jr. (Briggs Bourgeois kick) (3 plays, 59 yards, 1:44)	USM 13–2
1	02:36	USM	Jason Brownlee 76-yard pass from Zach Wilcke (Briggs Bourgeois kick) (1 play, 76 yards, 0:12)	USM 20–2
1	00:00	LA	Kenneth Almendares 50-yard field goal (9 plays, 42 yards, 2:36)	USM 20–5
2	10:21	USM	Camron Harrell safety (2 plays, -1 yards, 0:45)	USM 22–5
2	05:29	USM	Jason Brownlee 12-yard pass from Frank Gore, Jr. (Briggs Bourgeois kick) (11 plays, 69 yards, 4:43)	USM 29–5
2	03:39	LA	Michael Jefferson 63-yard pass from Ben Wooldridge (Kenneth Almendares PAT blocked) (5 plays, 75 yards, 1:50)	USM 29–11
3	02:34	LA	John Stephens Jr. 9-yard pass from Ben Wooldridge (Two-Point pass conversion attempt failed) (6 plays, 85 yards, 2:14)	USM 29–17
4	10:30	USM	Briggs Bourgeois 25-yard field goal (8 plays, 28 yards, 4:03)	USM 32–17
4	03:12	LA	Terrence Williams 1-yard rush (Kenneth Almendares kick) (3 plays, 7 yards, 0:51)	USM 32–24
4	01:14	USM	Natrone Brooks 52-yard interception returned (Briggs Bourgeois kick) (5 plays, 16 yards, 0:51)	USM 39–24

Statistics	Louisiana	Southern Miss
First downs	17	15
Total yards	439	339
Rushing yards	103	150
Passing yards	336	189
Turnovers	4	2
Time of possession	26:47	33:13

Team	Category	Player	Statistics
Louisiana	Passing	Ben Wooldridge	21/46, 336 yards, 2 TD, 3 INT
Louisiana	Rushing	Chris Smith	11 carries, 47 yards
Louisiana	Receiving	Michael Jefferson	6 receptions, 179 yards, 1 TD
Southern Miss	Passing	Zach Wilcke	8/17, 137 yards, 2 TD, 1 INT
Southern Miss	Rushing	Frank Gore Jr.	23 carries, 87 yards
Southern Miss	Receiving	Jason Brownlee	3 receptions, 102 yards, 2 TD

=== Georgia State ===
	1	2	3	4	Total
Panthers	14	14	7	7	42
Golden Eagles	0	0	14	0	14

=== At Coastal Carolina ===
	1	2	3	4	Total
Golden Eagles	0	17	3	3	23
Chanticleers	17	0	3	6	26

=== South Alabama ===
	1	2	3	4	Total
Jaguars	3	10	0	14	27
Golden Eagles	7	3	7	3	20

=== At Louisiana–Monroe ===
	1	2	3	4	Total
Golden Eagles	10	0	0	10	20
Warhawks	0	7	3	0	10

=== Vs. Rice (LendingTree Bowl) ===
	1	2	3	4	Total
Owls	0	3	21	0	24
Golden Eagles	7	10	7	14	38
