= 2022 Troy Trojans football team =

American college football season

2022 Troy Trojans football

Sun Belt champion Sun Belt West Division co-champion Cure Bowl champion

Sun Belt Championship, W 45–26 vs. Coastal Carolina

Cure Bowl, W 18–12 vs. UTSA
- Conference: Sun Belt Conference
- West Division

Ranking
- Coaches: No. 20
- AP: No. 19
- Record: 12–2 (7–1 Sun Belt)
- Head coach: Jon Sumrall (1st season)
- Offensive coordinator: Joe Craddock (1st season)
- Offensive scheme: Spread
- Defensive coordinator: Shiel Wood (1st season)
- Base defense: 3–4
- Home stadium: Veterans Memorial Stadium

2022 Sun Belt Conference football standings
| | Conf. | | | Overall |
| Team | W | | L | W | | L |
|---|---|---|---|---|---|---|
East Division
| James Madison* x | 6 | – | 2 | 8 | – | 3 |
| Coastal Carolina xy | 6 | – | 2 | 9 | – | 4 |
| Marshall | 5 | – | 3 | 9 | – | 4 |
| Georgia Southern | 3 | – | 5 | 6 | – | 7 |
| Appalachian State | 3 | – | 5 | 6 | – | 6 |
| Georgia State | 3 | – | 5 | 4 | – | 8 |
| Old Dominion | 2 | – | 6 | 3 | – | 9 |
West Division
| No. 19 Troy xy$ | 7 | – | 1 | 12 | – | 2 |
| South Alabama x | 7 | – | 1 | 10 | – | 3 |
| Southern Miss | 4 | – | 4 | 7 | – | 6 |
| Louisiana | 4 | – | 4 | 6 | – | 7 |
| Louisiana–Monroe | 3 | – | 5 | 4 | – | 8 |
| Texas State | 2 | – | 6 | 4 | – | 8 |
| Arkansas State | 1 | – | 7 | 3 | – | 9 |
Championship: Troy 45, Coastal Carolina 26
$ – Conference champion; x – Division champion/co-champions; y – Championship game participant; * – Ineligible for postseason play due to FCS-to-FBS transition rules; Rankings from AP Poll

The 2022 Troy Trojans football team represented Troy University as a member of the West Division of the Sun Belt Conference during the 2022 NCAA Division I FBS football season. Led by first-year head coach Jon Sumrall, the Trojans played home games at Veterans Memorial Stadium in Troy, Alabama.

Linebacker Carlton Martial began the 2022 season needing 104 tackles to break the all-time NCAA Division I FBS record for most tackles in a career. On November 12, 2022, he recorded his 546th tackle to break the prior record of 545 tackles set by Tim McGarigle of Northwestern.

== Preseason ==
=== Recruiting class ===
College recruiting
| Name | Hometown | School | Height | Weight | 40^{‡} | Commit date |
|---|---|---|---|---|---|---|
| Lawson Chandler; OL | Bainbridge, GA | Bainbridge HS | 6 ft 4 in (1.93 m) | 320 lb (150 kg) | – | Dec 16, 2020 |
| Lawson Chandler; OL | Recruit ratings: Scout: Rivals: 247Sports: ESPN: | | | | | |
| Jamarcus Chatman; DE | Rome, GA | Rome HS; Florida State | 6 ft 2 in (1.88 m) | 271 lb (123 kg) | – | Dec 16, 2020 |
| Jamarcus Chatman; DE | Recruit ratings: Scout: Rivals: 247Sports: ESPN: | | | | | |
| Ollie Finch; WR | Attalla, AL | Etowah HS | 6 ft 2 in (1.88 m) | 175 lb (79 kg) | – | Dec 16, 2020 |
| Ollie Finch; WR | Recruit ratings: Scout: Rivals: 247Sports: ESPN: | | | | | |
| Cherokee Glasgow; DT | Mount Vernon, NY | Mount Vernon HS; Maryland | 6 ft 2 in (1.88 m) | 280 lb (130 kg) | – | Feb 3, 2021 |
| Cherokee Glasgow; DT | Recruit ratings: Scout: Rivals: 247Sports: ESPN: | | | | | |
| Kyran Griffin-Isom; WR | New Orleans, LA | West Creek HS; Palomar College | 6 ft 3 in (1.91 m) | 175 lb (79 kg) | – | Dec 16, 2020 |
| Kyran Griffin-Isom; WR | Recruit ratings: Scout: Rivals: 247Sports: ESPN: | | | | | |
| Quayde Hawkins; QB | Bainbridge, GA | Bainbridge HS | 6 ft 1 in (1.85 m) | 190 lb (86 kg) | – | Dec 16, 2020 |
| Quayde Hawkins; QB | Recruit ratings: Scout: Rivals: 247Sports: ESPN: | | | | | |
| Peyton Higgins; WR | Florience, AL | Mars Hill Bible | 5 ft 10 in (1.78 m) | 180 lb (82 kg) | – | Dec 16, 2020 |
| Peyton Higgins; WR | Recruit ratings: Scout: Rivals: 247Sports: ESPN: | | | | | |
| Phillip Lee; LB | Jacksonville, FL | First Coast HS | 6 ft 4 in (1.93 m) | 215 lb (98 kg) | – | Dec 16, 2020 |
| Phillip Lee; LB | Recruit ratings: Scout: Rivals: 247Sports: ESPN: | | | | | |
| Taiyon Palmer; CB | Lawrenceville, GA | Archer HS; NC State | 5 ft 11 in (1.80 m) | 185 lb (84 kg) | – | Dec 16, 2020 |
| Taiyon Palmer; CB | Recruit ratings: Scout: Rivals: 247Sports: ESPN: | | | | | |
| Julian Peterson; DT | Pinson, AL | Pinson Valley HS | 6 ft 3 in (1.91 m) | 295 lb (134 kg) | – | Dec 16, 2020 |
| Julian Peterson; DT | Recruit ratings: Scout: | | | | | |

=== Sun Belt coaches poll ===
The Sun Belt coaches poll was released on July 25, 2022. The Trojans were picked to finish third in the West Division.

=== Sun Belt Preseason All-Conference teams ===
Offense

1st team

- Austin Stidham – Offensive lineman, SR
- Tez Johnson – Wide receiver, SO

Defense

1st team

- Javon Solomon – Defensive lineman, SO
- Will Choloh – Defensive lineman, SR
- Carlton Martial – Linebacker, SR

2nd team

- Richard Jibunor – Defensive lineman, JR
- TJ Harris – Defensive back, SR

== Schedule ==
| Date | Time | Opponent | Rank | Site | TV | Result | Attendance |
|---|---|---|---|---|---|---|---|
| September 3 | 3:00 p.m. | at No. 21 Ole Miss* | | Vaught–Hemingway Stadium; Oxford, MS | SECN | L 10–28 | 60,533 |
| September 10 | 6:00 p.m. | Alabama A&M* | | Veterans Memorial Stadium; Troy, AL | ESPN3 | W 38–17 | 26,189 |
| September 17 | 2:30 p.m. | at Appalachian State | | Kidd Brewer Stadium; Boone, NC (College GameDay) | ESPN+ | L 28–32 | 34,406 |
| September 24 | 6:00 p.m. | Marshall | | Veterans Memorial Stadium; Troy, AL | NFLN | W 16–7 | 27,514 |
| October 1 | 6:00 p.m. | at Western Kentucky* | | Houchens Industries–L. T. Smith Stadium; Bowling Green, KY | ESPN+ | W 34–27 | 20,168 |
| October 8 | 6:00 p.m. | Southern Miss | | Veterans Memorial Stadium; Troy, AL | ESPN+ | W 27–10 | 26,017 |
| October 15 | 2:30 p.m. | Texas State^{†} | | Veterans Memorial Stadium; Troy, AL | ESPN3 | W 17–14 | 23,480 |
| October 20 | 6:30 p.m. | at South Alabama | | Hancock Whitney Stadium; Mobile, AL (rivalry) | ESPNU | W 10–6 | 25,450 |
| November 5 | 4:00 p.m. | at Louisiana | | Cajun Field; Lafayette, LA | ESPN+ | W 23–17 | 7,888 |
| November 12 | 2:30 p.m. | Army* | | Veterans Memorial Stadium; Troy, AL | NFLN | W 10–9 | 31,010 |
| November 19 | 2:30 p.m. | Louisiana–Monroe | | Veterans Memorial Stadium; Troy, AL | ESPN+ | W 34–16 | 23,864 |
| November 26 | 2:30 p.m. | at Arkansas State | | Centennial Bank Stadium; Jonesboro, AR | ESPNU | W 48–19 | 9,376 |
| December 3 | 2:30 p.m. | Coastal Carolina | | Veterans Memorial Stadium; Troy, AL (Sun Belt Championship Game) | ESPN | W 45–26 | 21,554 |
| December 16 | 2:00 p.m. | vs. No. 25 UTSA* | No. 24 | Exploria Stadium; Orlando, FL (Cure Bowl) | ESPN | W 18–12 | 11,911 |
*Non-conference game; ^{†}Homecoming; Rankings from AP Poll (and CFP Rankings, after November 1) - Released prior to game; All times are in Central time

== Personnel ==
2022 Troy Trojans football team roster
Players
Coaches
Offense

| Pos. | # | Name | Class |
|---|---|---|---|
| WR | 0 | RaJae' Johnson | Sr |
| RB | 1 | Jamontez Woods | So |
| TE | 2 | Deyunkrea Lewis | So |
| QB | 3 | Peter Costelli | Fr |
| WR | 4 | Marcus Rogers | Sr |
| WR | 5 | Jabre Barber | So |
| WR | 7 | Devonte Ross | Fr |
| WR | 8 | Demontrez Brown | Jr |
| QB | 9 | Jarret Doege | Sr |
| QB | 10 | Tucker Kilcrease | Fr |
| WR | 11 | Deshon Stoudemire | Jr |
| QB | 12 | Quayde Hawkins | Fr |
| WR | 15 | Tez Johnson | So |
| WR | 16 | Peyton Higgins | Fr |
| QB | 17 | Jameson Holcomb | Fr |
| QB | 18 | Gunnar Watson | Jr |
| QB | 19 | Will Carn | Fr |
| RB | 20 | DK Billingsley | Sr |
| RB | 21 | Jarris Williams | Fr |
| RB | 22 | Tae Meadows (W) | Fr |
| RB | 24 | Damien Taylor | Fr |
| RB | 25 | Charles Strong | Jr |
| RB | 26 | DeWhitt Betterson Jr. | Fr |
| RB | 28 | Kimani Vidal | So |
| WR | 29 | Jaidyn Wilson | Jr |
| TE | 43 | Russell Weeks | Fr |
| TE | 45 | Gage Messick | Fr |
| TE | 49 | Jackson Blalock | Fr |
| OL | 51 | Chase Little | So |
| OL | 55 | Jake Andrews | Jr |
| OL | 58 | Logan Self | Fr |
| OL | 60 | Browder Braswell | Fr |
| OL | 61 | Tyler Cappi | Fr |
| OL | 62 | Matthew Johnson | Fr |
| OL | 63 | Carson Burt | So |
| OL | 64 | DeAndre Butler | Sr |
| OL | 66 | Sebastian Joseph | Jr |
| OL | 67 | Grant Betts | Jr |
| OL | 68 | Sydney Solomon | Jr |
| OL | 69 | Jonas Woods | Jr |
| OL | 70 | Tyler Harvey-Fallows | So |
| OL | 71 | Kyler Gibson | Fr |
| OL | 72 | Beau Sellers | Fr |
| OL | 74 | Daniel King | So |
| OL | 75 | Kobe Williams | So |
| OL | 77 | Derrick Graham | Fr |
| OL | 78 | Jeremiah Frazier | So |
| OL | 79 | Austin Stidham | Sr |
| WR | 80 | Kaden Cupp | Fr |
| WR | 81 | Robert Bruce | So |
| WR | 82 | Markus Ferrell | Jr |
| WR | 83 | DJ Epps | Fr |
| TE | 84 | AJ Lewis | Jr |
| WR | 85 | Jamarcus Knight | Jr |
| WR | 86 | Rondell Cole | Jr |
| WR | 87 | Jaden Warren | So |
| TE | 88 | Michael Vice | Jr |
| TE | 89 | Clayton Ollendieck | Jr |

Defense

| Pos. | # | Name | Class |
|---|---|---|---|
| DT | 0 | Jamarcus Chatman | Jr |
| CB | 1 | Elijah Culp | So |
| LB | 2 | Carlton Martial | Sr |
| DE | 3 | Antonio Showers | Sr |
| S | 4 | Craig Slocum | Sr |
| DT | 5 | Will Choloh | Sr |
| SPR | 6 | Taiyon Palmer | Jr |
| LB | 7 | KJ Robertson | Sr |
| S | 8 | TJ Harris | Sr |
| BAN | 9 | Richard Jibunor | Jr |
| LB | 10 | Jayden McDonald | Jr |
| CB | 11 | O'Shai Fletcher | Jr |
| S | 12 | Markeis Colvin | Jr |
| CB | 13 | Zion Williams | Sr |
| CB | 14 | Caleb Ransaw | So |
| SPR | 15 | Orlando Lacey | Sr |
| S | 16 | Tyler Founds | Fr |
| S | 17 | Carloss Crawford | Jr |
| CB | 18 | Reddy Steward | Jr |
| S | 19 | Darrell Starling | So |
| DT | 21 | Shakel Brown | Sr |
| SPR | 22 | Christian Murphy | So |
| S | 23 | Keyshawn Swanson | So |
| LB | 24 | Blake Matthews | Fr |
| S | 25 | Justin Powe | Fr |
| CB | 26 | Kyle Cass | Jr |
| S | 27 | John Butler | Fr |
| SPR | 28 | Sterling Roberts | Fr |
| LB | 29 | Rorrick Steward | Sr |
| CB | 30 | Nasir Pogue | Fr |
| S | 31 | Dell Pettus | Jr |
| BAN | 32 | Phillip Lee | Fr |
| SPR | 33 | Tim Steward | Jr |
| LB | 34 | Jordan Stringer | Fr |
| LB | 35 | Vady Clark | Fr |
| LB | 36 | Terry Thomas | Fr |
| CB | 37 | Miles Beaty | Fr |
| CB | 38 | Tye Pouncey | So |
| LB | 39 | Riley Slaughter | Fr |
| S | 40 | Tyson Wall | Fr |
| BAN | 41 | Javon Solomon | So |
| LB | 42 | Jacob Foster | Fr |
| CB | 43 | Jordan Killings | Fr |
| S | 44 | Tavares Williams Jr. | Fr |
| LB | 45 | Luke Hodge | Fr |
| DE | 47 | Devon Reaves | So |
| DT | 52 | Buddha Jones | Jr |
| BAN | 85 | Eric Shaw | Fr |
| DE | 91 | Cameron Reese | Fr |
| DT | 92 | Julian Peterson | Fr |
| DT | 95 | Luis Medina | So |
| DT | 97 | AJ Pierce | Jr |
| DE | 98 | T. J. Jackson | So |
| DE | 99 | Fabian Rogosch | Fr |

Special teams

| Pos. | # | Name | Class |
|---|---|---|---|
| P, K | 6 | Kyle Coale | Sr |
| K | 13 | Brooks Buce | Sr |
| LS | 35 | Collin Westfelt | Fr |
| LS | 39 | Brennen Milliron | Jr |
| K | 40 | Scott Taylor Renfroe | Fr |
| P | 44 | Mike Rivers | Sr |
| K | 46 | Zach Long | Fr |
| K | 48 | Nick Woolfolk | Sr |
| LS | 53 | Quentin Skinner | So |
| LS | 73 | Caleb Robbins | Fr |

Head coach

- Jon Sumrall (Kentucky)

Coordinators/assistant coaches

- Joe Craddock (Middle Tennessee)
  Offensive coordinator/QB
- Shiel Wood (Wofford)
  Defensive coordinator/S
- Gary Banks (Troy)
  Wide receivers
- Bam Hardmon (Illinois)
  Defensive run game coordinator/OLB
- Brock Hays (Grambling State)
  Running backs
- Eric McDaniel (Purdue)
  Defensive linemen
- Evan McKissack (Troy)
  Tight ends
- Travis Pearson (Alabama State)
  Cornerbacks
- Taylor Polk (Mississippi)
  Inside linebackers
- Cole Popovich (Fresno State)
  Offensive linemen
- Rusty Whitt (Abilene Christian)
  Strength & conditioning coach

Legend

- (C) Team captain
- (S) Suspended
- (I) Ineligible
- Injured
- Redshirt

Roster
Last update: 18 January 2025

== Game summaries ==
=== At No. 21 Ole Miss ===
Game One: Troy Trojans (0–0) at No. 21 Ole Miss Rebels (0–0) - Game summary

| Quarter | 1 | 2 | 3 | 4 | Total |
|---|---|---|---|---|---|
| Trojans | 0 | 3 | 0 | 7 | 10 |
| No. 21 Rebels | 7 | 14 | 7 | 0 | 28 |

at Vaught–Hemingway Stadium • Oxford, MS

- Date: Saturday, September 3, 2022
- Game time: 3:00 p.m. CST
- Game weather: sunny • Temperature: 86 °F (30 °C)
- Game attendance: 60,533
- Referee: Matt Loeffler
- TV announcers (SECN):
  Taylor Zarzour (play-by-play)
  Matt Stinchcomb (color)
  Alyssa Lang (sideline)

Game information

First Quarter

- (2:25) Ole Miss – Ulysses Bentley IV 2 yard run (Jonathan Cruz kick)
  Ole Miss 7–0; 9 plays, 82 yards, 2:13

Second Quarter

- (11:51) Ole Miss – Jonathan Mingo 2 yard run (Jonathan Cruz kick)
  Ole Miss 14–0; 10 plays, 79 yards, 3:01
- (6:38) Ole Miss – Quinshon Judkins 2 yard run (Jonathan Cruz kick)
  Ole Miss 21–0; 11 plays, 83 yards, 3:40
- (0:00) Troy – Brooks Buce 31 yard field goal
  Ole Miss 21–3; 11 plays, 47 yards, 3:09

Third Quarter

- (10:42) Ole Miss – Malik Heath 12 yard pass from Jaxson Dart (Jonathan Cruz kick)
  Ole Miss 28–3; 13 plays, 75 yards, 4:18

Fourth Quarter

- (0:57) Troy – RaeJae' Johnson 3 yard run from Gunnar Watson (Brooks Buce kick)
  Ole Miss 28–10; 11 plays, 39 yards, 5:07

| Statistics | Troy | Ole Miss |
|---|---|---|
| First downs | 20 | 24 |
| Total yards | 346 | 433 |
| Rushes/yards | 33/60 | 44/266 |
| Passing yards | 286 | 167 |
| Passing: Comp–Att–Int | 35–48–1 | 19–29–1 |
| Time of possession | 36:58 | 23:02 |

| Team | Category | Player | Statistics |
|---|---|---|---|
| Troy | Passing | Gunnar Watson | 34–47, 275 yards, 1 TD, 1 INT |
| Troy | Rushing | Kimani Vidal | 12 carries, 48 yards |
| Troy | Receiving | Jabre Barber | 5 receptions, 60 yards |
| Ole Miss | Passing | Jaxson Dart | 18–27, 154 yards, 1 TD, 1 INT |
| Ole Miss | Rushing | Zach Evans | 20 carries, 130 yards |
| Ole Miss | Receiving | Michael Trigg | 4 receptions, 33 yards |

=== Alabama A&M ===
| | 1 | 2 | 3 | 4 | Total |
|---|---|---|---|---|---|
| A&M Bulldogs | 3 | 0 | 0 | 14 | 17 |
| Trojans | 0 | 7 | 21 | 10 | 38 |

=== At Appalachian State ===
Troy Trojans (1–1) at Appalachian State Mountaineers (1–1) – Game summary

| Quarter | 1 | 2 | 3 | 4 | Total |
|---|---|---|---|---|---|
| Trojans | 7 | 14 | 0 | 7 | 28 |
| Mountaineers | 7 | 7 | 10 | 8 | 32 |

at Kidd Brewer Stadium, Boone, North Carolina

- Date: September 17
- Game time: 3:30 p.m. EDT
- Game weather: Cloudy, 72 °F (22 °C)
- Game attendance: 34,406
- Referee: Jeremy Parker
- TV announcers (ESPN+): David Jackson and Avery Hall

Game information
First quarter
- APP – Christian Wells 17-yard pass from Chase Brice (Michael Hughes kick), 13:48. Mountaineers 7–0. Drive: 3 plays, 38 yards, 5:57.
- TROY – D. K. Billingsley 19-yard run (Brooks Bruce kick), 6:49. Tied 7–7. Drive: 13 plays, 75 yards, 6:59.

Second quarter

- TROY – Gunnar Watson 1-yard run (Brooks Bruce kick), 8:43. Trojans 14–7. Drive: 8 plays, 81 yards, 3:51.
- APP – Anderson Castle 18-yard pass from Chase Brice (Michael Hughes kick), 1:22. Tied 14–14. Drive: 14 plays, 75 yards, 7:21.
- TROY – Gunnar Watson 1-yard run (Brooks Bruce kick), 0:00. Trojans 21–14. Drive: 12 plays, 75 yards, 1:22.

Third quarter

- APP – Daetrich Harrington 19-yard run (Michael Hughes kick), 11:35. Tied 21–21. Drive: 9 plays, 75 yards, 3:25.
- APP – Michael Hughes 23-yard field goal, 0:29. Mountaineers 24–21. Drive: 10 plays, 74 yards, 4:37.

Fourth quarter

- TROY – Kimani Vidal 1-yard run (Brooks Bruce kick), 10:10. Trojans 28–24. Drive: 12 plays, 79 yards, 5:14.
- APP – Gunnar Watson safety, 0:20. Trojans 28–26.
- APP – Christian Horn 53-yard pass from Chase Brice, 0:00. Mountaineers 32–28. Drive: 4 plays, 53 yards, 0:15.

Statistics

| Statistics | TROY | APP |
|---|---|---|
| First downs | 25 | 23 |
| Total yards | 359 | 456 |
| Rushing yards | 57 | 161 |
| Passing yards | 302 | 295 |
| Turnovers | 1 | 0 |
| Time of possession | 27:52 | 32:08 |

| Team | Category | Player | Statistics |
|---|---|---|---|
| Troy | Passing | Gunnar Watson | 23/37, 302 yards, INT |
| Troy | Rushing | D. K. Billingsley | 6 rushes, 38 yards, TD |
| Troy | Receiving | Deshon Stoudemire | 6 receptions, 70 yards |
| Appalachian State | Passing | Chase Brice | 22/34, 287 yards, 2 TD |
| Appalachian State | Rushing | Camerun Peoples | 17 rushes, 84 yards |
| Appalachian State | Receiving | Christian Horn | 5 receptions, 98 yards, TD |

=== Marshall ===
Game Four – Marshall Thundering Herd (2–1) at Troy Trojans (1–2)

| Quarter | 1 | 2 | 3 | 4 | Total |
|---|---|---|---|---|---|
| Thundering Herd | 0 | 0 | 7 | 0 | 7 |
| Trojans | 10 | 0 | 0 | 6 | 16 |

at Veterans Memorial Stadium • Troy, Alabama

- Date: Saturday, September 24, 2022
- Game time: 7:00 p.m. EDT
- Game weather: Clear • Temperature: 82 °F (28 °C) • Wind: W 4 mph
- Game attendance: 27,514
- Referee: Wayne Winkler
- TV announcers (NFLN): Jason Ross Jr. (play-by-play), Tyoka Jackson (analyst)

Game information

First quarter

- (10:51) TROY – Buddha Jones 23 yards fumble return, Brooks Buce kick (Troy 7–0)
- (5:31) TROY – Brooks Buce 40 yard field goal (Drive: 6 plays, 68 yards, 2:10; Troy 10–0)

Third quarter

- (4:25) MRSH – Khalan Laborn 14 yard run, Rece Verhoff kick (Drive: 2 plays, 16 yards, 0:37; Troy 10–7)

Fourth quarter

- (7:43) TROY – Brooks Buce 25 yard field goal (Drive: 5 plays, 69 yards, 1:41; Troy 13–7)
- (3:18) TROY – Brooks Buce 28 yard field goal (Drive: 5 plays, 64 yards, 3:11; Troy 16–7)

| Statistics | MRSH | TROY |
|---|---|---|
| First downs | 15 | 13 |
| Plays–yards | 69–174 | 56–421 |
| Rushes–yards | 48–96 | 31–100 |
| Passing yards | 78 | 321 |
| Passing: comp–att–int | 11–21–0 | 15–25–1 |
| Time of possession | 30:56 | 29:04 |

| Team | Category | Player | Statistics |
|---|---|---|---|
| Marshall | Passing | Henry Colombi | 8/13, 49 yards |
| Marshall | Rushing | Khalan Laborn | 29 carries, 113 yards, 1 TD |
| Marshall | Receiving | Caleb McMillan | 3 receptions, 37 yards |
| Troy | Passing | Gunnar Watson | 15/25, 321 yards, 1 INT |
| Troy | Rushing | DK Billingsley | 14 carries, 85 yards |
| Troy | Receiving | Tez Johnson | 2 receptions, 121 yards |

=== At Western Kentucky ===
| | 1 | 2 | 3 | 4 | Total |
|---|---|---|---|---|---|
| Trojans | 10 | 3 | 7 | 14 | 34 |
| Hilltoppers | 7 | 10 | 3 | 7 | 27 |

=== Southern Miss ===
| | 1 | 2 | 3 | 4 | Total |
|---|---|---|---|---|---|
| Golden Eagles | 0 | 7 | 3 | 0 | 10 |
| Trojans | 3 | 7 | 7 | 10 | 27 |

=== Texas State ===
| | 1 | 2 | 3 | 4 | Total |
|---|---|---|---|---|---|
| Bobcats | 0 | 7 | 7 | 0 | 14 |
| Trojans | 0 | 10 | 0 | 7 | 17 |

| Statistics | TXST | TROY |
|---|---|---|
| First downs | 13 | 17 |
| Total yards | 293 | 406 |
| Rushing yards | 86 | 107 |
| Passing yards | 207 | 299 |
| Turnovers | 0 | 1 |
| Time of possession | 30:26 | 29:34 |

| Team | Category | Player | Statistics |
|---|---|---|---|
| Texas State | Passing | Layne Hatcher | 21/32, 207 yards, TD |
| Texas State | Rushing | Lincoln Pare | 18 rushes, 67 yards, TD |
| Texas State | Receiving | Lincoln Pare | 3 receptions, 71 yards, TD |
| Troy | Passing | Gunnar Watson | 12/22, 240 yards, TD, INT |
| Troy | Rushing | D. K. Billingsley | 16 rushes, 70 yards |
| Troy | Receiving | Tez Johnson | 4 receptions, 94 yards, TD |

=== At South Alabama ===
| | 1 | 2 | 3 | 4 | Total |
|---|---|---|---|---|---|
| Trojans | 0 | 7 | 0 | 3 | 10 |
| Jaguars | 0 | 3 | 0 | 3 | 6 |

=== At Louisiana ===
Troy at Louisiana

| Team | 1 | 2 | 3 | 4 | Total |
|---|---|---|---|---|---|
| • Trojans | 0 | 0 | 7 | 16 | 23 |
| Ragin' Cajuns | 0 | 10 | 7 | 0 | 17 |

- Date: November 5, 2022
- Location: Cajun Field
  Lafayette, Louisiana
- Game start: 4:02 p.m. CDT
- Elapsed time: 3 hours and 18 minutes
- Game attendance: 7,888
- Game weather: 69 °F (21 °C) • Weather: Sunny • Wind: NE 8 MPH
- Referee: Javarro Edwards
- TV announcers (ESPN+): Dan McDonald (play–by–play) and Eric Mouton (analyst)

Scoring summary
| 2 | 05:39 | LA | Ben Wooldridge 11-yard rush (Kenneth Almendares kick) (13 plays, 80 yards, 5:38) | LA 7–0 |
| 2 | 01:27 | LA | Kenneth Almendares 30-yard field goal (9 plays, 36 yards, 3:27) | LA 10–0 |
| 3 | 08:36 | LA | Ben Wooldridge 10-yard rush (Kenneth Almendares kick) (12 plays, 77 yards, 6:15) | LA 17–0 |
| 3 | 00:00 | TROY | Michael Vice 3-yard pass from Gunnar Watson (Brooks Buce kick) (20 plays, 75 yards, 8:36) | LA 17–7 |
| 4 | 12:01 | TROY | Deyunkrea Lewis 35-yard pass from Gunnar Watson (Brooks Buce kick) (6 plays, 67 yards, 1:57) | LA 17–14 |
| 4 | 02:41 | TROY | Brooks Buce 37-yard field goal (6 plays, 54 yards, 2:32) | TIE 17–17 |
| 4 | 00:05 | TROY | Kimani Vidal 22-yard rush (Brooks Buce PAT blocked) (8 plays, 68 yards, 1:12) | TROY 23–17 |

| Statistics | Troy | Louisiana |
|---|---|---|
| First downs | 21 | 21 |
| Total yards | 377 | 315 |
| Rushing yards | 154 | 203 |
| Passing yards | 223 | 112 |
| Turnovers | 1 | 0 |
| Time of possession | 30:08 | 29:52 |

| Team | Category | Player | Statistics |
|---|---|---|---|
| Troy | Passing | Gunnar Watson | 21/35, 223 yards, 2 TD, 1 INT |
| Troy | Rushing | Kimani Vidal | 21 carries, 117 yards, 1 TD |
| Troy | Receiving | RaJae' Johnson | 5 receptions, 79 yards |
| Louisiana | Passing | Ben Wooldridge | 13/29, 112 yards |
| Louisiana | Rushing | Chris Smith | 18 carries, 97 yards |
| Louisiana | Receiving | Michael Jefferson | 6 receptions, 50 yards |

=== Army ===
Army Black Knights at Troy Trojans

| Quarter | 1 | 2 | 3 | 4 | Total |
|---|---|---|---|---|---|
| Black Knights | 0 | 9 | 0 | 0 | 9 |
| Trojans | 0 | 0 | 3 | 7 | 10 |

at Veterans Memorial Stadium, Troy, AL

- Date: November 12, 2022
- Game time: 2:30 p.m. CST
- Game weather: Temperature: 65 °F (18 °C) • Wind: S 11 mph • Weather: Cloudy
- Game attendance: 31,010
- Referee: Wayne Winkler
- TV announcers (NFLN): Jason Ross Jr. (play-by-play) & Tyoka Jackson (analyst)
- ESPN – Troy's Martial sets NCAA tackles record in win over Army /// Box Score, Army at Troy /// Army Pregame Notes /// Troy Pregame Notes /// Postgame Notes

Game information

First quarter

No scoring

Second quarter

- (14:57) ARMY TD – Tyhier Tyler 3-yard rush, Quinn Maretzki kick missed
  Drive: 11 plays, 48 yards, 5:14; Army 6–0
- (00:06) ARMY FG – Quinn Maretzki 26-yard field goal
  Drive: 16 plays, 66 yards, 6:34; Army 9–0

Third quarter

- (10:06) TROY FG – Brooks Buce 21-yard field goal
  Drive: 13 plays, 76 yards, 4:54; Army 9–3

Fourth quarter

- (08:04) TROY TD – Tez Johnson 3-yard pass from Gunnar Watson, Brooks Buce kick
  Drive: 8 plays, 57 yards, 3:19; Troy 10–9

Passing

- ARMY – Jemel Jones: 3/7, 42 yards
- TROY – Gunnar Watson: 15/31, 192 yards, 1 TD, 1 INT

Rushing

- ARMY – Tyhier Tyler: 27 carries, 100 yards, 1 TD
- TROY – Kimani Vidal: 13 carries, 72 yards

Receiving

- ARMY – Joshua Lingenfelter: 1 reception, 36 yards
- TROY – Tez Johnson: 6 receptions, 75 yards, 1 TD

Defense

- ARMY – Camden O'Gara: 8 total tackles (2 solo, 6 assisted), 0.5 tackles for loss, 0.5 sacks, 1 pass break-up
- TROY – Carlton Martial: 22 total tackles (6 solo, 16 assisted)

| Statistics | ARMY | TROY |
|---|---|---|
| First downs | 20 | 15 |
| 3rd down efficiency | 5–14 | 1–9 |
| 4th down efficiency | 1–2 | 1–1 |
| Plays–yards | 71–357 | 53–264 |
| Rushes–yards | 62–279 | 22–72 |
| Passing yards | 78 | 192 |
| Passing: Comp–Att–Int | 4–9–0 | 15–31–1 |
| Penalties–yards | 3–20 | 3–35 |
| Turnovers | 2 | 2 |
| Time of possession | 37:07 | 22:53 |

=== Louisiana-Monroe ===
| | 1 | 2 | 3 | 4 | Total |
|---|---|---|---|---|---|
| Warhawks | 0 | 3 | 7 | 6 | 16 |
| Trojans | 3 | 17 | 7 | 7 | 34 |

=== At Arkansas State ===
| | 1 | 2 | 3 | 4 | Total |
|---|---|---|---|---|---|
| Trojans | 7 | 0 | 7 | 34 | 48 |
| Red Wolves | 3 | 10 | 6 | 0 | 19 |

=== Coastal Carolina (SBC Championship) ===
2022 Hercules Tires Sun Belt Football Championship
Coastal Carolina Chanticleers (9–2, 6–2) vs. Troy Trojans (10–2, 7–2)

| Quarter | 1 | 2 | 3 | 4 | Total |
|---|---|---|---|---|---|
| Coastal Carolina | 0 | 7 | 6 | 13 | 26 |
| Troy | 17 | 14 | 14 | 0 | 45 |

at Veterans Memorial Stadium • Troy, Alabama

- Date: Saturday, December 3, 2022
- Game time: 2:40 p.m CDT
- Game weather: 78 °F (26 °C) • Overcast • Wind 4 mph (6.4 km/h) WSW
- Game attendance: 21,554
- Referee: Wayne Winkler
- TV announcers (ESPN): Dave Flemming, Rod Gilmore and Tiffany Blackmon

Game information

First Quarter

- (11:07) TROY – Brooks Bruce 35 yard field goal (Drive: 9 plays, 57 yards, 3:53; Troy 3–0)
- (9:28) TROY – Deshon Stoudemire 65 yard pass from Gunnar Watson, Brooks Bruce kick (Drive: 1 play, 65 yards, 0:12; Troy 10–0)
- (4:09) TROY – DK Billingsley 8 yard rush, Brooks Bruce kick (Drive: 4 plays, 62 yards, 1:43; Troy 17–0)

Second Quarter

- (12:36) TROY – DK Billingsley 33 yard rush, Brooks Bruce kick (Drive: 2 plays, 48 yards, 0:45; Troy 24–0)
- (9:47) TROY – RaJae' Johnson 67 yard pass from Gunnar Watson, Brooks Bruce kick (Drive: 5 plays, 74 yards, 1:46; Troy 31–0)
- (0:29) CCU – Grayson McCall 8 yard rush, Kade Hensley kick (Drive: 9 plays, 70 yards, 3:35; Troy 31–7)

Third Quarter

- (12:08) CCU – Jared Brown 30 yard pass from Grayson McCall, two-point pass conversion failed (Drive: 6 plays, 75 yards, 2:52; Troy 31–13)
- (8:42) TROY – RaJae' Johnson 36 yard pass from Gunnar Watson, Brooks Bruce kick (Drive: 6 plays, 72 yards, 3:26; Troy 38–13)
- (4:49) TROY – DK Billingsley 3 yard rush, Brooks Bruce kick (Drive: 8 plays, 7 yards, 3:40; Troy 45–13)

Fourth Quarter

- (14:55) CCU – Sam Pinckney 11 yard pass from Grayson McCall, two-point pass conversion failed (Drive: 10 plays, 75 yards, 4:54; Troy 45–19)
- (6:09) CCU – Tyson Mobley 21 yard pass from Grayson McCall, Kade Hensley kick (Drive: 10 plays, 85 yards, 4:03; Troy 45–26)

| Statistics | Coastal Carolina | Troy |
|---|---|---|
| First downs | 27 | 16 |
| plays–yards | 72–432 | 53–411 |
| Rushes/yards | 31–113 | 36–93 |
| Passing yards | 319 | 318 |
| Passing: Comp–Att–Int | 29–41–1 | 12–17–0 |
| Time of possession | 32:22 | 27:38 |

| Team | Category | Player | Statistics |
|---|---|---|---|
| Coastal Carolina | Passing | Grayson McCall | 29/41, 319 yards, 3 TDs, 1 INT |
| Coastal Carolina | Rushing | Reese White | 8 carries, 44 yards |
| Coastal Carolina | Receiving | Tyson Mobley | 7 receptions, 109 yards, 1 TD |
| Troy | Passing | Gunnar Watson | 12/17, 318 yards, 3 TDs |
| Troy | Rushing | DK Billingsley | 9 carries, 57 yards, 3 TDs |
| Troy | Receiving | RaJae' Johnson | 4 receptions, 134 yards, 2 TDs |

=== Vs. No 25 UTSA (Cure Bowl) ===
| | 1 | 2 | 3 | 4 | Total |
|---|---|---|---|---|---|
| No. 24 Trojans | 0 | 7 | 8 | 3 | 18 |
| No. 25 Roadrunners | 2 | 10 | 0 | 0 | 12 |

== Rankings ==
Ranking movements Legend: ██ Increase in ranking ██ Decrease in ranking — = Not ranked RV = Received votes
| | Week | | | | | | | | | | | | | | | |
| Poll | Pre | 1 | 2 | 3 | 4 | 5 | 6 | 7 | 8 | 9 | 10 | 11 | 12 | 13 | 14 | Final |
|---|---|---|---|---|---|---|---|---|---|---|---|---|---|---|---|---|
| AP | — | — | — | — | — | — | — | — | — | RV | RV | RV | RV | RV | 23 | 19 |
| Coaches | — | — | — | — | — | — | — | — | — | RV | RV | RV | RV | RV | 24 | 20 |
| CFP | Not released | | | | | | | | | — | — | — | — | — | 24 | Not released |

== Players drafted into the NFL ==
| Round | Pick | Player | Position | NFL Club |
|---|---|---|---|---|
| 4 | 107 | Jake Andrews | C | New England Patriots |
